= 2022–23 Toluca FC season =

Toluca
2022–23 season
- President: Francisco Suinaga
- Manager: Ignacio Ambríz
- Stadium: Nemesio Díez
- Liga MX: Apertura: 6th (Runner-up); Clausura: 3rd
- Top goalscorer: League: Jean Meneses (7); All: Camilo Sanvezzo (9)
- Highest home attendance: 27,273 vs Guadalajara, Pumas UNAM, América, and Cruz Azul
- Lowest home attendance: 17,402 vs Puebla and Querétaro
- Average home league attendance: 21,462
- Biggest win: Santos Laguna 0–5 Toluca (23 February 2023)
- Biggest defeat: Toluca 1–5 Pachuca (27 October 2022)
Home colours	Away colours	Third colours

The 2022–23 Deportivo Toluca F.C. season is the 106th season in the football club's history and the 62nd consecutive season in the top flight of Mexican football. Toluca will compete in Liga MX.

== Players ==
=== First-team squad ===
As of 31 August 2022

Note: Flags indicate national team as defined under FIFA eligibility rules; some limited exceptions apply. Players may hold more than one non-FIFA nationality.

No.	Pos.	Nation	Player
1	GK	BRA	Tiago Volpi
2	DF	MEX	Raúl López
4	DF	CHI	Valber Huerta
5	DF	MEX	Carlos Guzmán
6	DF	MEX	Jorge Torres Nilo
7	FW	BRA	Camilo Sanvezzo
8	MF	USA	Sebastian Saucedo
10	MF	URU	Leonardo Fernández
11	MF	MEX	Daniel Álvarez (on loan from Puebla)
12	GK	MEX	Gustavo Gutiérrez
14	MF	MEX	Marcel Ruiz

No.	Pos.	Nation	Player
15	MF	ECU	Jordan Sierra
16	MF	CHI	Jean Meneses
18	MF	MEX	Fernando Navarro
20	DF	MEX	Jorge Rodríguez
21	DF	COL	Brayan Angulo
22	GK	MEX	Luis García
23	MF	CHI	Claudio Baeza
24	DF	MEX	Haret Ortega
26	DF	COL	Andrés Mosquera
27	MF	MEX	Alan Rodríguez
32	FW	PAR	Carlos González

== Transfers ==
=== Transfers out ===
Date	Position	No.	Player	To	Type	Ref.
16 August 2022	FW	–	(Ecuador) Michael Estrada	(Mexico) Cruz Azul	Loan	

== Pre-season and friendlies ==
Win Draw Loss Fixtures

== Competitions ==
=== Overview ===
Competition	First match	Last match	Starting round	Final position	Record							
Competition	First match	Last match	Starting round	Final position	Pld	W	D	L	GF	GA	GD	Win %
Apertura 2022	2 July 2022	30 October 2022	Matchday 1	6th (Runner-up)	24	11	7	6	41	36	+5	45.83
Clausura 2023	14 January 2023	TBD	Matchday 1		12	6	4	2	24	12	+12	50.00
Total					36	17	11	8	65	48	+17	47.22

Last updated: 17 March 2023
Source: Mediotiempo.com

=== Liga MX ===
==== Torneo Apertura ====
===== League table =====
Pos	Team	Pld	W	D	L	GF	GA	GD	Pts	Qualification
4	Pachuca (C)	17	9	5	3	28	15	+13	32	Qualification for the quarter-finals
5	UANL	17	9	3	5	24	14	+10	30	Qualification for the reclassification
6	Toluca	17	7	6	4	27	23	+4	27	Qualification for the reclassification
7	Cruz Azul	17	7	3	7	26	34	−8	24	Qualification for the reclassification
8	Puebla	17	4	10	3	24	22	+2	22	Qualification for the reclassification

Source: Liga MX
Rules for classification: 1) Points; 2) Goal difference; 3) Number of goals scored; 4) Head-to-head results between tied teams; 5) Number of goals scored away; 6) Highest relegation coefficient; 7) Fair Play points
(C) Champions

===== Results summary =====
Overall								Home						Away					
Pld	W	D	L	GF	GA	GD	Pts	W	D	L	GF	GA	GD	W	D	L	GF	GA	GD
24	11	7	6	41	36	+5	40	7	4	2	27	22	+5	4	3	4	14	14	0

Last updated: 30 October 2022.
Source: Soccerway

===== Results round by round =====
Round	1	2	3	4	5	6	7	8	9	10	11	12	13	14	15	16	17	18	19	20	21	22	23	24
Ground	A	H	A	H	A	A	H	H	A	H	A	H	H	A	H	A	H	H	H	A	H	A	H	A
Result	W	W	L	W	W	D	D	W	W	D	L	L	D	D	L	D	D	W	W	W	W	D	L	L
Position	2	1	3	2	2	3	1	1	1	2	6	5	6	6	6	6	6	RE	QF	QF	SF	SF	F	F

Updated to match(es) played on 30 October 2022. Source: Mediotiempo.com
A = Away; H = Home; W = Win; D = Draw; L = Loss; F = Final; QF = Quarter-finals; RE = Reclassification; SF = Semi-finals

===== Matches =====
====== Reclassification ======
9 October 2022 Reclassification	Toluca	3–0	Juárez	Toluca
12:00 CDT	Sanvezzo 23'; González 46'; Ruiz 90+2'			Stadium: [[Estadio Nemesio Díez]|Nemesio Díez]] Attendance: 25,069; Referee: Marco Antonio Ortiz

====== Quarter-finals ======
13 October 2022 First leg	Toluca	4–3	Santos Laguna	Toluca
19:06 CDT	González 4'; Sanvezzo 6', 73'; Volpi 90+2' (pen.)		Gorriarán 30' (pen.); Preciado 38'; Aguirre 49'	Stadium: [[Estadio Nemesio Díez]|Nemesio Díez]] Attendance: 24,161; Referee: Diego Montaño Robles

15 October 2022 Second leg	Santos Laguna	1–2 (6–4 agg.)	Toluca	Torreón
18:06 CDT	Gorriarán 90+6'		Meneses 47'; Mosquera 50'	Stadium: Corona; Attendance: 23,851; Referee: Luis Enrique Santander

====== Semi-finals ======
19 October 2022 First leg	Toluca	2–1	América	Toluca
19:06 CDT	González 4'; Sanvezzo 6', 73'; Volpi 90+2' (pen.)		Gorriarán 30' (pen.); Preciado 38'; Aguirre 49'	Stadium: [[Estadio Nemesio Díez]|Nemesio Díez]] Attendance: 24,161; Referee: Marco Antonio Ortiz

22 October 2022 Second leg	América	1–1 (3–2 agg.)	Toluca	Mexico City
20:06 CDT	Zendejas 35'		Torres Nilo 29'	Stadium: Azteca; Attendance: 62,945; Referee: Adonai Escobedo

====== Final ======
27 October 2022 First leg	Toluca	1–5	Pachuca	Toluca
20:06 CDT	Mosquera (yellow card) 12'; Baeza (yellow card) 68'; Sierra 78'; Ruiz (yellow card) 90+1'	Report	Paulino (yellow card) 2'; Ibarra 8', 36'; Cabral 13'; Isais 41'; Ibáñez 53'	Stadium: Nemesio Díez; Attendance: 27,232; Referee: Marco Antonio Ortiz

30 October 2022 Second leg	Pachuca	3–1 (8–2 agg.)	Toluca	Pachuca
19:36 CDT	Guzmán 45+3'; Ibáñez 53'; Cabral 75' (pen.)	Report	López 21'	Stadium: Hidalgo; Attendance: 21,080; Referee: Adonai Escobedo

==== Torneo Clausura ====
===== League table =====
Pos	Team	Pld	W	D	L	GF	GA	GD	Pts	Qualification
2	América	17	9	7	1	36	21	+15	34	Qualification for the quarter-finals
3	Guadalajara	17	10	4	3	28	18	+10	34	Qualification for the quarter-finals
4	Toluca	17	9	5	3	34	19	+15	32	Qualification for the quarter-finals
5	Pachuca	17	10	1	6	32	22	+10	31	Qualification for the reclassification
6	León	17	8	6	3	23	13	+10	30	Qualification for the reclassification

Source: Liga MX
Rules for classification: 1) Points; 2) Goal difference; 3) Number of goals scored; 4) Head-to-head results between tied teams; 5) Number of goals scored away; 6) Highest relegation coefficient; 7) Fair Play points

===== Results summary =====
Overall								Home						Away					
Pld	W	D	L	GF	GA	GD	Pts	W	D	L	GF	GA	GD	W	D	L	GF	GA	GD
12	6	4	2	24	12	+12	22	3	2	0	11	4	+7	3	2	2	13	8	+5

Last updated: 18 March 2023.
Source: Soccerway

===== Results round by round =====
Round	1	2	3	4	5	6	7	8	9	10	11	12	13	14	15	16	17
Ground	H	A	H	A	A	H	A	A	H	A	H	A	H	A	A	H	H
Result	D	L	D	D	W	W	W	W	W	L	W	D					
Position	11	13	7	9	10	5	8	6	2	5	2	3					

Updated to match(es) played on 19 March 2023. Source: Mediotiempo.com
A = Away; H = Home; W = Win; D = Draw; L = Loss

== Squad statistics ==
=== Goalscorers ===
Includes all competitive matches.

As of matches played 29 April 2023

Rank	Pos.	No.	Player	Liga Apertura	Liguilla Apertura	Liga Clausura	Total
1	FW	7	(Brazil) Camilo Sanvezzo	6	3	2	11
2	FW	32	(Paraguay) Carlos González	1	2	8	10
3	MF	16	(Chile) Jean Meneses	7	1	1	9
3	FW	10	(Uruguay) Leonardo Fernández	5	1	3	9
5	MF	11	(Uruguay) Maximiliano Araújo	–	–	6	6
6	MF	14	(Mexico) Marcel Ruiz	1	1	2	4
6	GK	1	(Brazil) Tiago Volpi	0	1	3	4
8	FW	18	(Mexico) Iván López	0	0	3	3
9	MF	18	(Mexico) Fernando Navarro	2	0	0	2
9	DF	26	(Colombia) Andrés Mosquera	1	1	0	2
9	DF	4	(Chile) Valber Huerta	2	0	0	2
9	MF	15	(Ecuador) Jordan Sierra	1	1	–	2
13	MF	11	(Mexico) Daniel Álvarez	1	0	–	1
13	DF	24	(Mexico) Haret Ortega	0	1	0	1
13	DF	6	(Mexico) Jorge Torres Nilo	0	1	0	1
13	DF	2	(Mexico) Raúl López	0	1	–	1
13	MF	8	(United States) Sebastián Saucedo	0	0	1	1
13	DF	3	(Mexico) Carlos Orrantia	0	0	1	1
13	DF	17	(Mexico) Brian García	–	–	1	1
13	DF	21	(Colombia) Brayan Angulo	0	0	1	1
Own Goals				0	0	1	1
Total				27	14	34	75

Sources: Soccerway, Liga MX

=== Clean sheets ===
The list is sorted by shirt number when total clean sheets are equal. Numbers in parentheses represent games where both goalkeepers participated and both kept a clean sheet; the number in parentheses is awarded to the goalkeeper who was substituted on, whilst a full clean sheet is awarded to the goalkeeper who was on the field at the start of play.

				Clean sheets			
No.	Player	Games Played	Goals Against	Apertura 2022	Apertura Liguilla	Clausura 2023	Total
1	(Brazil) Tiago Volpi	39	52	2	1	5	8
12	(Mexico) Gustavo Gutiérrez	2	1	1	0	0	1
Totals			53	3	1	5	9
