= Apertura 2022 Liga MX final phase =

Tournament details
- Dates: 8–30 October 2022
- Teams: 12

Tournament statistics
- Matches played: 18
- Goals scored: 61 (3.39 per match)
- Attendance: 587,175 (32,621 per match)

The Apertura 2022 Liga MX final phase was played between 8 October and 30 October 2022. A total of twelve teams competed in the final phase to decide the champions of the Apertura 2022 Liga MX season. For the fifth straight season, an additional qualifying round, the reclassification or repechaje, was employed, which expanded the number of playoff spots to twelve.

Both finalists qualified for the 2024 CONCACAF Champions Cup.

Due to the 2022 FIFA World Cup being held in November and December, the Apertura 2022 regular season and final phase began earlier than previous seasons. As a result, the final was held on 30 October 2022 and not in the middle of December.

Pachuca defeated Toluca 8–2 on aggregate to win their seventh league title. As winners, Pachuca faced UANL, the Clausura 2023 champions, in the 2023 Campeón de Campeones.

== Qualified teams ==
The following teams qualified for the championship stage.

In the following tables, the number of appearances, last appearance, and previous best result count only those in the short tournament era starting from Invierno 1996 (not counting those in the long tournament era from 1943–44 to 1995–96).

Qualified directly to quarter-finals (4 teams)
Seed	Team	Points (GD)	Date of qualification	Appearance	Last appearance	Previous best	Ref.
1	América	38	6 September 2022 (REC); 16 September 2022 (QF)	37th	Clausura 2022	Champions (5 times)	
2	Monterrey	35	6 September 2022 (REC); 16 September 2022 (QF)	27th	Clausura 2022	Champions (4 times)	
3	Santos Laguna	33	6 September 2022 (REC); 2 October 2022 (QF)	34th	Apertura 2021	Champions (6 times)	
4	Pachuca	32	7 September 2022 (REC); 18 September 2022 (QF)	38th	Clausura 2022	Champions (5 times)	

Qualified to Reclassification round (8 teams)
Seed	Team	Points (GD)	Date of qualification	Appearance	Last appearance	Previous best	Ref.
5	UANL	30	13 September 2022	30th	Clausura 2022	Champions (5 times)	
6	Toluca	27	16 September 2022	36th	Apertura 2021	Champions (7 times)	
7	Cruz Azul	24 (−8)	23 September 2022	33rd	Clausura 2022	Champions (2 times)	
8	Puebla	22 (+2, 24 GF)	23 September 2022	12th	Clausura 2022	Semi-finals (3 times)	
9	Guadalajara	22 (+2, 19 GF)	18 September 2022	29th	Clausura 2022	Champions (3 times)	
10	León	21	23 September 2022	15th	Apertura 2021	Champions (3 times)	
11	Juárez	19 (−1)	1 October 2022	1st	Debut	—	
12	Necaxa	19 (−7)	2 October 2022	20th	Clausura 2022	Champions (Invierno 1998)	

== Format ==
=== Reclassification ===
- All rounds were played in a single match hosted by the higher seed.
- If a match ended in a draw, it proceeded directly to a penalty shoot-out.

=== Liguilla ===
- Teams were re-seeded each round.
- The winners of the reclassification matches were seeded based on their ranking in the classification table.
- Team with more goals on aggregate after two matches advanced.
- No away goals rule was applied in either round; if the two teams were tied on aggregate, the higher seeded team advanced.
- In the final, if the two teams were tied after both legs, the match went to extra time and, if necessary, a penalty shoot-out.
- Both finalists qualified for the 2024 CONCACAF Champions Cup.

== Reclassification ==
=== Summary ===
Matches took place on 8–9 October 2022.

Team 1	Score	Team 2
UANL	2–0	Necaxa
Toluca	3–0	Juárez
Cruz Azul	1–0	León
Puebla	1–1 (5–4 p)	Guadalajara

=== Matches ===
8 October 2022
19:00 CDT (UTC−5)

UANL	2–0	Necaxa
Gignac 60', 73'	Report

Estadio Universitario, San Nicolás de los Garza
Attendance: 36,585
Referee: César Arturo Ramos (Sinaloa)

8 October 2022
21:15 CDT (UTC−5)

Cruz Azul	1–0	León
Rivero 72'	Report

Estadio Azteca, Mexico City
Attendance: 22,291
Referee: Fernando Guerrero (Mexico City)

9 October 2022
12:00 CDT (UTC−5)

Toluca	3–0	Juárez
Sanvezzo 23'; González 46'; Ruiz 90+2'	Report

Estadio Nemesio Díez, Toluca
Attendance: 25,069
Referee: Marco Antonio Ortiz (Durango)

9 October 2022
16:30 CDT (UTC−5)

Puebla	1–1	Guadalajara
Barragán 58'	Report	Cisneros 90+6'
Penalties
de Buen (penalty scored); Mancuello (penalty scored); Martínez (penalty scored); Reyes (penalty scored); Escoto (penalty scored)	5–4	(penalty scored) Vega; (penalty scored) Mozo; (penalty scored) Ormeño; (penalty missed) Angulo; (penalty scored) Zaldívar

Estadio Cuauhtémoc, Puebla
Attendance: 43,135
Referee: Luis Enrique Santander (Guanajuato)

== Seeding ==
The following is the final seeding for the final phase. The winners of the Reclassification matches were seeded based on their position in the classification table.

Seed	Team	Pld	W	D	L	GF	GA	GD	Pts	Host
1	América	17	12	2	3	37	16	+21	38	Hosts second leg
2	Monterrey	17	10	5	2	29	13	+16	35	Hosts second leg
3	Santos Laguna	17	10	3	4	38	21	+17	33	Hosts second leg
4	Pachuca	17	9	5	3	28	15	+13	32	Hosts second leg
5	UANL	17	9	3	5	24	14	+10	30	Hosts first leg
6	Toluca	17	7	6	4	27	23	+4	27	Hosts first leg
7	Cruz Azul	17	7	3	7	26	34	−8	24	Hosts first leg
8	Puebla	17	4	10	3	24	22	+2	22	Hosts first leg

Source: Liga MX
Rules for classification: 1) Points; 2) Goal difference; 3) Goals scored; 4) Away goals scored; 5) Drawing of lots.

== Bracket ==
Quarter-finals
2	Monterrey	0	3	3
7	Cruz Azul	0	0	0
4	Pachuca (s)	0	2	2
5	UANL	1	1	2
1	América	6	5	11
8	Puebla	1	1	2
3	Santos Laguna	3	1	4
6	Toluca	4	2	6

Semi-finals
2	Monterrey	2	0	2
4	Pachuca	5	1	6
1	América	1	1	2
6	Toluca	2	1	3

Final
4	Pachuca	5	3	8
6	Toluca	1	1	2

== Quarter-finals ==
=== Summary ===
The first legs were played on 12–13 October, and the second legs were played on 15–16 October.

Team 1	Agg.	Team 2	1st leg	2nd leg
Puebla	2–11	América	1–6	1–5
Cruz Azul	0–3	Monterrey	0–0	0–3
Toluca	6–4	Santos Laguna	4–3	2–1
UANL	2–2 (s)	Pachuca	1–0	1–2

=== Matches ===
First leg

12 October 2022
19:30 (Note: Kickoff was scheduled for 19:06 and was postponed to 19:30 due to heavy rainfall prior to the start of the match.) CDT (UTC−5)

Puebla	1–6	América
Cortizo 14'	Report	Valdés 31'; Martín 33', 57'; Zendejas 65'; B. Rodríguez 77'; Viñas 90+2'

Estadio Cuauhtémoc, Puebla
Attendance: 44,471
Referee: Marco Antonio Ortiz (Durango)

12 October 2022
21:06 CDT (UTC−5)

Cruz Azul	0–0	Monterrey
	Report

Estadio Azteca, Mexico City
Attendance: 24,571
Referee: Víctor Cáceres Hernández (Chiapas)

13 October 2022
19:06 CDT (UTC−5)

Toluca	4–3	Santos Laguna
González 4'; Sanvezzo 6', 73'; Volpi 90+2' (pen.)	Report	Gorriarán 30' (pen.); Preciado 38'; Aguirre 49'

Estadio Nemesio Díez, Toluca
Attendance: 24,161
Referee: Diego Montaño Robles (Jalisco)

13 October 2022
21:06 CDT (UTC−5)

UANL	1–0	Pachuca
Gignac 88' (pen.)	Report

Estadio Universitario, San Nicolás de los Garza
Attendance: 40,487
Referee: Fernando Hernández Gómez (Mexico City)

Second leg

15 October 2022
18:06 CDT (UTC−5)

Monterrey	3–0	Cruz Azul
Berterame 20'; Funes Mori 85'; Gallardo 90+4'	Report

Estadio BBVA, Guadalupe
Attendance: 39,578
Referee: Adonai Escobedo (Aguascalientes)

Monterrey won 3–0 on aggregate.

15 October 2022
20:06 CDT (UTC−5)

América	5–1	Puebla
B. Rodríguez 21'; Martín 27'; Martínez 50'; Fidalgo 60'; Layún 85' (pen.)	Report	Araujo 35'

Estadio Azteca, Mexico City
Attendance: 44,298
Referee: Daniel Quintero Huitrón (Jalisco)

América won 11–2 on aggregate.

16 October 2022
19:06 CDT (UTC−5)

Santos Laguna	1–2	Toluca
Gorriarán 90+6'	Report	Meneses 47'; Mosquera 50'

Estadio Corona, Torreón
Attendance: 23,851
Referee: Luis Enrique Santander (Guanajuato)

Toluca won 6–4 on aggregate.

16 October 2022
21:06 CDT (UTC−5)

Pachuca	2–1	UANL
Guzmán 19'; López 68'	Report	Pizarro 64'

Estadio Hidalgo, Pachuca
Attendance: 15,565
Referee: Fernando Guerrero (Mexico City)

2–2 on aggregate. Pachuca advanced due to being the higher seed in the classification table.

== Semi-finals ==
=== Summary ===
The first legs were played on 19–20 October, and the second legs were played on 22–23 October.

Team 1	Agg.	Team 2	1st leg	2nd leg
Toluca	3–2	América	2–1	1–1
Pachuca	6–2	Monterrey	5–2	1–0

=== Matches ===
First leg

19 October 2022
21:06 CDT (UTC−5)

Toluca	2–1	América
Ortega 23'; Fernández 42' (pen.)	Report	Lara 79'

Estadio Nemesio Díez, Toluca
Attendance: 27,273
Referee: Marco Antonio Ortiz (Durango)

20 October 2022
21:06 CDT (UTC−5)

Pachuca	5–2	Monterrey
Ibáñez 9', 86' (pen.), 90+2'; Ibarra 23'; Paulino 47'	Report	Moreno 16'; Romo 42'

Estadio Hidalgo, Pachuca
Attendance: 13,235
Referee: César Arturo Ramos (Sinaloa)

Second leg

22 October 2022
20:06 CDT (UTC−5)

América	1–1	Toluca
Zendejas 35'	Report	Torres Nilo 29'

Estadio Azteca, Mexico City
Attendance: 62,945
Referee: Adonai Escobedo (Aguascalientes)

Toluca won 3–2 on aggregate.

23 October 2022
20:06 CDT (UTC−5)

Monterrey	0–1	Pachuca
	Report	Hurtado 90+5' (pen.)

Estadio BBVA, Guadalupe
Attendance: 51,348
Referee: Luis Enrique Santander (Guanajuato)

Pachuca won 6–2 on aggregate.

== Final ==
=== Summary ===
The first leg was played on 27 October, and the second leg was played on 30 October.

Team 1	Agg.	Team 2	1st leg	2nd leg
Toluca	2–8	Pachuca	1–5	1–3

=== First leg ===
27 October 2022
20:06 CDT (UTC−5)

Toluca	1–5	Pachuca
Sierra 78'	Report	Ibarra 8', 36'; Cabral 13'; Isais 41'; Ibáñez 53'

Estadio Nemesio Díez, Toluca
Attendance: 27,273
Referee: Marco Antonio Ortiz (Durango)

==== Details ====
Toluca	Pachuca

GK	1	(Brazil) Tiago Volpi
DF	26	(Colombia) Andrés Mosquera	(yellow card) 12'
DF	24	(Mexico) Haret Ortega		(substituted off) 46'
DF	4	(Chile) Valber Huerta
DF	5	(Mexico) Carlos Guzmán		(substituted off) 74'
MF	10	(Uruguay) Leonardo Fernández
MF	23	(Chile) Claudio Baeza (c)	(yellow card) 68'
MF	14	(Mexico) Marcel Ruiz	(yellow card) 90+1'
MF	16	(Chile) Jean Meneses		(substituted off) 74'
FW	7	(Brazil) Camilo Sanvezzo		(substituted off) 46'
FW	32	(Paraguay) Carlos González		(substituted off) 53'
Substitutions:
GK	12	(Mexico) Gustavo Gutiérrez
DF	6	(Mexico) Jorge Torres Nilo
DF	20	(Mexico) Jorge Rodríguez
DF	21	(Colombia) Brayan Angulo		(substituted on) 46'
MF	8	(United States) Sebastian Saucedo
MF	11	(Mexico) Daniel Álvarez		(substituted on) 53'
MF	15	(Ecuador) Jordan Sierra		(substituted on) 74'
MF	18	(Mexico) Fernando Navarro		(substituted on) 46'
MF	27	(Mexico) Alan Rodríguez
FW	190	(Mexico) Isaías Violante		(substituted on) 74'
Manager:
(Mexico) Ignacio Ambríz

GK	5	(Argentina) Oscar Ustari (c)
DF	2	(Mexico) Kevin Álvarez
DF	22	(Argentina) Gustavo Cabral
DF	23	(Colombia) Óscar Murillo
DF	85	(United States) Mauricio Isais
MF	10	(Mexico) Érick Sánchez
MF	24	(Mexico) Luis Chávez
MF	19	(Spain) Paulino	(yellow card) 2'	(substituted off) 58'
MF	6	(Mexico) Víctor Guzmán		(substituted off) 63'
MF	30	(Ecuador) Romario Ibarra		(substituted off) 58'
FW	7	(Argentina) Nicolás Ibáñez		(substituted off) 73'
Substitutions:
GK	25	(Mexico) Carlos Moreno
DF	4	(Mexico) Miguel Tapias
DF	14	(Mexico) José Castillo
MF	16	(Mexico) Javier Eduardo López		(substituted on) 58'
MF	11	(Colombia) Avilés Hurtado		(substituted on) 58'
MF	18	(Colombia) Marino Hinestroza
MF	88	(Mexico) Pedro Pedraza
MF	100	(Mexico) Israel Luna		(substituted on) 63'
FW	9	(Mexico) Roberto de la Rosa
FW	90	(Mexico) Illian Hernández		(substituted on) 73'
Manager:
(Uruguay) Guillermo Almada

Assistant referees:
Christian Kiabek Espinosa (Mexico City)
Jorge Antonio Sánchez (Estado de México)
Fourth official:
Fernando Guerrero (Mexico City)
Video assistant referee:
Fernando Hernández Gómez (Mexico City)
Assistant video assistant referee:
Michel Ricardo Espinoza (Mexico City)

==== Statistics ====
Statistic	Toluca	Pachuca
Goals scored	1	5
Total shots	21	14
Shots on target	5	6
Saves	1	4
Ball possession	62%	38%
Corner kicks	11	4
Fouls committed	15	16
Offsides	1	2
Yellow cards	3	1
Red cards	0	0

=== Second leg ===
30 October 2022
19:36 CST (UTC−6)

Pachuca	3–1	Toluca
Guzmán 45+3'; Ibáñez 53'; Cabral 75' (pen.)	Report	López 21'

Estadio Hidalgo, Pachuca
Attendance: 21,080
Referee: Adonai Escobedo (Aguascalientes)

Pachuca won 8–2 on aggregate.

==== Details ====
Pachuca	Toluca

GK	5	(Argentina) Oscar Ustari (c)
DF	2	(Mexico) Kevin Álvarez
DF	22	(Argentina) Gustavo Cabral	(yellow card) 27'
DF	23	(Colombia) Óscar Murillo
DF	85	(United States) Mauricio Isais
MF	10	(Mexico) Érick Sánchez
MF	24	(Mexico) Luis Chávez	(yellow card) 63'	(substituted off) 80'
MF	19	(Spain) Paulino		(substituted off) 69'
MF	6	(Mexico) Víctor Guzmán		(substituted off) 79'
MF	30	(Ecuador) Romario Ibarra		(substituted off) 69'
FW	7	(Argentina) Nicolás Ibáñez	(yellow card) 49'	(substituted off) 82'
Substitutions:
GK	25	(Mexico) Carlos Moreno
DF	4	(Mexico) Miguel Tapias
DF	14	(Mexico) José Castillo
MF	16	(Mexico) Javier Eduardo López		(substituted on) 79'
MF	11	(Colombia) Avilés Hurtado		(substituted on) 69'
MF	18	(Colombia) Marino Hinestroza		(substituted on) 69'
MF	86	(Mexico) Jahaziel Marchand
MF	100	(Mexico) Israel Luna		(substituted on) 80'
FW	9	(Mexico) Roberto de la Rosa		(substituted on) 82'
FW	90	(Mexico) Illian Hernández
Manager:
(Uruguay) Guillermo Almada

GK	1	(Brazil) Tiago Volpi
DF	2	(Mexico) Raúl López	(yellow card) 11'	(substituted off) 46'
DF	26	(Colombia) Andrés Mosquera
DF	4	(Chile) Valber Huerta
DF	21	(Colombia) Brayan Angulo		(substituted off) 46'
MF	23	(Chile) Claudio Baeza (c)		(substituted off) 77'
MF	14	(Mexico) Marcel Ruiz
MF	10	(Uruguay) Leonardo Fernández		(substituted off) 66'
MF	18	(Mexico) Fernando Navarro		(substituted off) 46'
MF	16	(Chile) Jean Meneses	(yellow card) 60'
FW	32	(Paraguay) Carlos González
Substitutions:
GK	12	(Mexico) Gustavo Gutiérrez
DF	6	(Mexico) Jorge Torres Nilo
DF	20	(Mexico) Jorge Rodríguez		(substituted on) 66'
DF	24	(Mexico) Haret Ortega	(yellow card) 50'	(substituted on) 46'
MF	8	(United States) Sebastian Saucedo
MF	11	(Mexico) Daniel Álvarez		(substituted on) 46'
MF	15	(Ecuador) Jordan Sierra
MF	27	(Mexico) Alan Rodríguez		(substituted on) 77'
FW	7	(Brazil) Camilo Sanvezzo	(yellow card) 66'	(substituted on) 46'
FW	190	(Mexico) Isaías Violante
Manager:
(Mexico) Ignacio Ambríz

Assistant referees:
Karen Janet Díaz (Aguascalientes)
Miguel Ángel Hernández (Puebla)
Fourth official:
Luis Enrique Santander (Guanajuato)
Video assistant referee:
César Arturo Ramos (Sinaloa)
Assistant video assistant referee:
Alberto Morín Méndez (Chihuahua)

==== Statistics ====
Statistic	Pachuca	Toluca
Goals scored	3	1
Total shots	22	8
Shots on target	8	2
Saves	1	5
Ball possession	40%	60%
Corner kicks	7	3
Fouls committed	15	13
Offsides	1	1
Yellow cards	3	4
Red cards	0	0

== Statistics ==
=== Goalscorers ===
There were 61 goals scored in 18 matches, for an average of 3.39 goals per match.

5 goals

- (Argentina) Nicolás Ibáñez (Pachuca)

3 goals

- (France) André-Pierre Gignac (UANL)
- (Ecuador) Romario Ibarra (Pachuca)
- (Mexico) Henry Martín (América)
- (Brazil) Camilo Sanvezzo (Toluca)

2 goals

- (Argentina) Gustavo Cabral (Pachuca)
- (Paraguay) Carlos González (Toluca)
- (Uruguay) Fernando Gorriarán (Santos Laguna)
- (Mexico) Víctor Guzmán (Pachuca)
- (Uruguay) Brian Rodríguez (América)
- (Mexico) Alejandro Zendejas (América)

1 goal

- (Mexico) Eduardo Aguirre (Santos Laguna)
- (Uruguay) Maximiliano Araújo (Puebla)
- (Mexico) Martín Barragán (Puebla)
- (Argentina) Germán Berterame (Monterrey)
- (Mexico) Carlos Cisneros (Guadalajara)
- (Mexico) Jordi Cortizo (Puebla)
- (Spain) Paulino (Pachuca)
- (Uruguay) Leonardo Fernández (Toluca)
- (Spain) Álvaro Fidalgo (América)
- (Mexico) Rogelio Funes Mori (Monterrey)
- (Mexico) Jesús Gallardo (Monterrey)
- (Colombia) Avilés Hurtado (Pachuca)
- (United States) Mauricio Isais (Pachuca)
- (Mexico) Emilio Lara (América)
- (Mexico) Miguel Layún (América)
- (Mexico) Javier Eduardo López (Pachuca)
- (Mexico) Raúl López (Toluca)
- (Colombia) Roger Martínez (América)
- (Chile) Jean Meneses (Toluca)
- (Mexico) Héctor Moreno (Monterrey)
- (Colombia) Andrés Mosquera (Toluca)
- (Mexico) Haret Ortega (Toluca)
- (Argentina) Guido Pizarro (UANL)
- (Colombia) Harold Preciado (Santos Laguna)
- (Uruguay) Ignacio Rivero (Cruz Azul)
- (Mexico) Luis Romo (Monterrey)
- (Mexico) Marcel Ruiz (Toluca)
- (Ecuador) Jordan Sierra (Toluca)
- (Mexico) Jorge Torres Nilo (Toluca)
- (Chile) Diego Valdés (América)
- (Uruguay) Federico Viñas (América)
- (Brazil) Tiago Volpi (Toluca)

=== Assists ===
3 assists

- (Paraguay) Carlos González (Toluca)
- (Mexico) Víctor Guzmán (Pachuca)

2 assists

- (Uruguay) Leonardo Fernández (Toluca)
- (Ecuador) Romario Ibarra (Pachuca)
- (Argentina) Matías Kranevitter (Monterrey)
- (Colombia) Roger Martínez (América)
- (Mexico) Fernando Navarro (Toluca)

1 assist

- (Mexico) Daniel Álvarez (Toluca)
- (Colombia) Brayan Angulo (Toluca)
- (Mexico) Jesús Angulo (Guadalajara)
- (Mexico) Néstor Araujo (América)
- (Argentina) Juan Brunetta (Santos Laguna)
- (Mexico) Omar Campos (Santos Laguna)
- (Mexico) Luis Chávez (Pachuca)
- (Spain) Paulino (Pachuca)
- (Mexico) Raymundo Fulgencio (UANL)
- (France) André-Pierre Gignac (UANL)
- (Mexico) Alfonso González (Monterrey)
- (Mexico) Jair González (Santos Laguna)
- (Colombia) Marino Hinestroza (Pachuca)
- (Argentina) Federico Mancuello (Puebla)
- (Mexico) Henry Martín (América)
- (Mexico) Emilio Martínez (Puebla)
- (Chile) Jean Meneses (Toluca)
- (Colombia) Óscar Murillo (Pachuca)
- (Mexico) Fernando Navarro (Toluca)
- (Mexico) Guillermo Ochoa (América)
- (Uruguay) Brian Rodríguez (América)
- (Uruguay) Jonathan Rodríguez (América)
- (Mexico) Érick Sánchez (Pachuca)
- (Paraguay) Richard Sánchez (América)
- (Chile) Diego Valdés (América)
- (Uruguay) Federico Viñas (América)
- (Brazil) Tiago Volpi (Toluca)
