= Clausura 2023 Liga MX final phase =

Tournament details
- Dates: 6–28 May 2023
- Teams: 12

Tournament statistics
- Matches played: 18
- Goals scored: 47 (2.61 per match)
- Attendance: 664,423 (36,912 per match)

The Clausura 2023 Liga MX final phase was played between 6 May and 28 May 2023. A total of twelve teams competed in the final phase to decide the champions of the Clausura 2023 Liga MX season. For the sixth straight season, an additional qualifying round, the reclassification or repechaje, was employed, which expanded the number of final phase spots to twelve. The winners of the reclassification matches advanced to the quarter-finals of the liguilla (mini league).

UANL defeated Guadalajara 3–2 on aggregate to win their eighth league title. As winners, UANL faced Pachuca in the 2023 Campeón de Campeones.

== Qualified teams ==
The following teams qualified for the final phase.

In the following tables, the number of appearances, last appearance, and previous best result count only those in the short tournament era starting from Invierno 1996 (not counting those in the long tournament era from 1943–44 to 1995–96).

Qualified directly to quarter-finals (4 teams)
Seed	Team	Points (GD)	Date of qualification	Appearance	Last appearance	Previous best	Ref.
1	Monterrey	40	17 March 2023 (REC); 15 April 2023 (QF)	28th	Apertura 2022	Champions (4 times)	
2	América	34 (+15)	9 April 2023; 28 April 2023 (QF)	38th	Apertura 2022	Champions (5 times)	
3	Guadalajara	34 (+10)	9 April 2023; 29 April 2023 (QF)	30th	Apertura 2022	Champions (3 times)	
4	Toluca	32	7 April 2023; 30 April 2023 (QF)	37th	Apertura 2022	Champions (7 times)	

Qualified to Reclassification round (8 teams)
Seed	Team	Points (GD)	Date of qualification	Appearance	Last appearance	Previous best	Ref.
5	Pachuca	31	10 April 2023	39th	Apertura 2022	Champions (6 times)	
6	León	30	9 April 2023	16th	Apertura 2022	Champions (3 times)	
7	UANL	25	20 April 2023	31st	Apertura 2022	Champions (5 times)	
8	Cruz Azul	24	21 April 2023	34th	Apertura 2022	Champions (2 times)	
9	Atlas	21	29 April 2023	25th	Clausura 2022	Champions (2 times)	
11	Puebla	20	29 April 2023	13th	Apertura 2022	Semi-finals (3 times)	
12	Atlético San Luis	19 (−5)	29 April 2023	3rd	Clausura 2022	Quarter-finals (Clausura 2022)	
13	Santos Laguna	19 (−14)	29 April 2023	35th	Apertura 2022	Champions (6 times)	

== Format ==
=== Reclassification ===
- All rounds were played in a single match hosted by the higher seed
- If a match ended in a draw, it proceeded directly to a penalty shoot-out.

=== Liguilla ===
- Teams were re-seeded after each round.
- The winners of the reclassification matches were seeded based on their ranking in the classification table.
- Team with more goals on aggregate after two matches advanced.
- No away goals rule was applied in either round; if the two teams were tied on aggregate, the higher-seeded team advanced.
- In the final, if the two teams were tied after both legs, the match went to extra time and, if necessary, a penalty shoot-out.
- Both finalists qualified for the 2024 CONCACAF Champions Cup.

== Reclassification ==
=== Summary ===
Matches took place on 6–7 May 2023.

Team 1	Score	Team 2
Pachuca	4–4 (2–4 p)	Santos Laguna
León	1–3	Atlético San Luis
UANL	1–0	Puebla
Cruz Azul	0–1	Atlas

=== Matches ===
6 May 2023
17:00 CST (UTC−6)

Cruz Azul	0–1	Atlas
	Report	Lozano 2'

Estadio Azteca, Mexico City
Attendance: 49,826
Referee: César Arturo Ramos (Sinaloa)

6 May 2023
19:10 CST (UTC−6)

Pachuca	4–4	Santos Laguna
Arango 7'; de la Rosa 14'; Ibarra 43'; Sánchez 90+3'	Report	Preciado 11'; Torres 26'; López 52'; Dória 90+5'
Penalties
Cabral (penalty missed); Chávez (penalty scored); López (penalty scored); Paulino (penalty missed)	2–4	(penalty scored) Brunetta; (penalty scored) Correa; (penalty scored) Dória; (penalty scored) Lozano

Estadio Hidalgo, Pachuca
Attendance: 12,142
Referee: Adonai Escobedo (Aguascalientes)

7 May 2023
19:06 CST (UTC−6)

León	1–3	Atlético San Luis
Dávila 3'	Report	Bonatini 6'; Güémez 33'; Vitinho 45+1'

Estadio León, León
Attendance: 22,335
Referee: Víctor Alfonso Cáceres (Chiapas)

7 May 2023
21:10 CST (UTC−6)

UANL	1–0	Puebla
Córdova 56'	Report

Estadio Universitario, San Nicolás de los Garza
Attendance: 31,233
Referee: Marco Antonio Ortiz (Durango)

== Seeding ==
The following is the final seeding for the final phase. The winners of the Reclassification matches were seeded based on their position in the classification table.

Seed	Team	Pld	W	D	L	GF	GA	GD	Pts	Host
1	Monterrey	17	13	1	3	35	14	+21	40	Hosts second leg
2	América	17	9	7	1	36	21	+15	34	Hosts second leg
3	Guadalajara	17	10	4	3	28	18	+10	34	Hosts second leg
4	Toluca	17	9	5	3	34	19	+15	32	Hosts second leg
5	UANL	17	7	4	6	20	17	+3	25	Hosts first leg
6	Atlas	17	4	9	4	27	22	+5	21	Hosts first leg
7	Atlético San Luis	17	5	4	8	16	21	−5	19	Hosts first leg
8	Santos Laguna	17	5	4	8	23	37	−14	19	Hosts first leg

Source: Liga MX
Rules for classification: 1) Points; 2) Goal difference; 3) Goals scored; 4) Away goals scored; 5) Drawing of lots.

== Bracket ==
Quarter-finals
2	América	3	1	4
7	Atlético San Luis	1	2	3
3	Guadalajara (s)	0	1	1
6	Atlas	1	0	1
1	Monterrey	0	2	2
8	Santos Laguna	0	0	0
4	Toluca	1	3	4
5	UANL	4	1	5

Semi-finals
2	América	1	1	2
3	Guadalajara	0	3	3
1	Monterrey	1	0	1
5	UANL	1	1	2

Final
3	Guadalajara	0	2	2
5	UANL (a.e.t.)	0	3	3

== Quarter-finals ==
=== Summary ===
The first legs were played on 10–11 May, and the second legs were played on 13–14 May.

Team 1	Agg.	Team 2	1st leg	2nd leg
Santos Laguna	0–2	Monterrey	0–0	2–0
Atlético San Luis	3–4	América	1–3	2–1
Atlas	1–1 (s)	Guadalajara	1–0	0–1
UANL	5–4	Toluca	4–1	1–3

=== First leg ===
10 May 2023
19:00 CST (UTC−6)

Santos Laguna	0–0	Monterrey
	Report

Estadio Corona, Torreón
Attendance: 17,818
Referee: Luis Enrique Santander (Guanajuato)

10 May 2023
21:10 CST (UTC−6)

Atlético San Luis	1–3	América
Bonatini 24'	Report	J. Rodríguez 10'; Valdés 20'; Suárez 35'

Estadio Alfonso Lastras, San Luis Potosí
Attendance: 21,823
Referee: Fernando Guerrero (Mexico City)

11 May 2023
19:00 CST (UTC−6)

Atlas	1–0	Guadalajara
Quiñones 42'	Report

Estadio Jalisco, Guadalajara
Attendance: 25,592
Referee: Marco Antonio Ortiz (Durango)

11 May 2023
21:10 CST (UTC−6)

UANL	4–1	Toluca
Córdova 14'; Gignac 31' (pen.); Vigón 45+5'; López 72'	Report	Fernández 8'

Estadio Universitario, San Nicolás de los Garza
Attendance: 34,490
Referee: Adonai Escobedo (Aguascalientes)

=== Second leg ===
13 May 2023
19:06 CST (UTC−6)

Monterrey	2–0	Santos Laguna
Funes Mori 3'; Meza 68'	Report

Estadio BBVA, Guadalupe
Attendance: 45,322
Referee: Oscar Macías Romo (Aguascalientes)

Monterrey won 2–0 on aggregate.

13 May 2023
21:16 CST (UTC−6)

América	1–2	Atlético San Luis
B. Rodríguez 88'	Report	Bilbao 18'; Bonatini 31'

Estadio Azteca, Mexico City
Attendance: 47,686
Referee: Daniel Quintero Huitrón (Jalisco)

América won 4–3 on aggregate.

14 May 2023
12:00 CST (UTC−6)

Toluca	3–1	UANL
López 26', 53'; Ruiz 45+3'	Report	Córdova 71'

Estadio Nemesio Díez, Toluca
Attendance: 27,253
Referee: César Arturo Ramos (Sinaloa)

UANL won 5–4 on aggregate.

14 May 2023
19:05 CST (UTC−6)

Guadalajara	1–0	Atlas
Sepúlveda 60'	Report

Estadio Akron, Zapopan
Attendance: 40,956
Referee: Victor Alfonso Caceres (Chiapas)

1–1 on aggregate. Guadalajara advanced due to being the higher seeded team in the table.

== Semi-finals ==
=== Summary ===
The first legs were played on 17–18 May, and the second legs were played on 20–21 May.

Team 1	Agg.	Team 2	1st leg	2nd leg
UANL	2–1	Monterrey	1–1	1–0
Guadalajara	3–2	América	0–1	3–1

=== First leg ===
17 May 2023
21:00 CST (UTC−6)

UANL	1–1	Monterrey
Córdova 50'	Report	Meza 35'

Estadio Universitario, San Nicolás de los Garza
Attendance: 41,615
Referee: Fernando Guerrero (Mexico City)

18 May 2023
20:10 CST (UTC−6)

Guadalajara	0–1	América
	Report	Zendejas 60'

Estadio Akron, Zapopan
Attendance: 42,195
Referee: César Arturo Ramos (Sinaloa)

=== Second leg ===
20 May 2023
19:06 CST (UTC−6)

Monterrey	0–1	UANL
	Report	Córdova 79'

Estadio BBVA, Guadalupe
Attendance: 52,839
Referee: Luis Enrique Santander (Guanajuato)

UANL won 2–1 on aggregate.

21 May 2023
20:00 CST (UTC−6)

América	1–3	Guadalajara
Valdés 57'	Report	Cisneros 19'; Mozo 76'; Orozco 89'

Estadio Azteca, Mexico City
Attendance: 67,501
Referee: Victor Alfonso Caceres (Chiapas)

Guadalajara won 3–2 on aggregate.

== Final ==
=== Summary ===
The first leg was played on 25 May, and the second leg was played on 28 May.

Team 1	Agg.	Team 2	1st leg	2nd leg
UANL	3–2	Guadalajara	0–0	3–2 (a.e.t.)

=== First leg ===
25 May 2023
20:00 CST (UTC−6)

UANL	0–0	Guadalajara
	Report

Estadio Universitario, San Nicolás de los Garza
Attendance: 41,615
Referee: Fernando Guerrero (Mexico City)

==== Details ====
UANL	Guadalajara

GK	1	(Argentina) Nahuel Guzmán
DF	20	(Mexico) Javier Aquino	(yellow card) 4'	(substituted off) 55'
DF	19	(Argentina) Guido Pizarro (c)
DF	13	(Mexico) Diego Reyes
DF	27	(Mexico) Jesús Angulo
MF	8	(Uruguay) Fernando Gorriarán	(yellow card) 52'	(substituted off) 54'
MF	5	(Brazil) Rafael Carioca
MF	23	(Colombia) Luis Quiñones		(substituted off) 89'
MF	17	(Mexico) Sebastián Córdova	(yellow card) 67'
MF	16	(Mexico) Diego Lainez		(substituted off) 68'
FW	10	(France) André-Pierre Gignac		(substituted off) 68'
Substitutions:
GK	182	(Mexico) Arturo Delgado
DF	2	(Chile) Igor Lichnovsky
DF	3	(Brazil) Samir
DF	184	(Mexico) Fernando Ordóñez
MF	6	(Mexico) Juan Pablo Vigón		(substituted on) 54'
MF	14	(Mexico) Jesús Garza		(substituted on) 55'
MF	22	(Mexico) Raymundo Fulgencio		(substituted on) 89'
MF	201	(Mexico) Sebastián Fierro
FW	9	(Argentina) Nicolás Ibáñez		(substituted on) 68'
FW	11	(Uruguay) Nicolás López		(substituted on) 68'
Manager:
(Uruguay) Robert Dante Siboldi

GK	23	(Mexico) Miguel Jiménez
DF	2	(Mexico) Alan Mozo
DF	4	(Mexico) Antonio Briseño	(yellow card) 4'
DF	3	(Mexico) Gilberto Sepúlveda
DF	13	(Mexico) Jesús Orozco	(yellow card) 69'
MF	20	(Mexico) Fernando Beltrán
MF	28	(Mexico) Fernando González	(yellow card) 58'	(substituted off) 65'
MF	25	(Mexico) Roberto Alvarado		(substituted off) 75'
MF	11	(Mexico) Isaác Brizuela		(substituted off) 58'
MF	5	(Mexico) Víctor Guzmán (c)		(substituted off) 75'
MF	10	(Mexico) Alexis Vega		(substituted off) 58'
Substitutions:
GK	27	(Mexico) Raúl Rangel
DF	17	(Mexico) Jesús Sánchez
DF	19	(Mexico) Alejandro Mayorga	(yellow card) 82'	(substituted on) 75'
MF	26	(Mexico) Cristian Calderón		(substituted on) 75'
MF	45	(Mexico) Raúl Martínez
MF	6	(Mexico) Pável Pérez		(substituted on) 58'
MF	29	(Mexico) Alan Torres		(substituted on) 65'
MF	30	(Mexico) Sergio Flores
MF	33	(Mexico) Zahid Muñoz
FW	18	(Mexico) Ronaldo Cisneros		(substituted on) 58'
Manager:
(Serbia) Veljko Paunović

Assistant referees:
Pablo Israel Hernández (Mexico City)
Leonardo Javier Castillo (Estado de México)
Fourth official:
Daniel Quintero Huitrón (Jalisco)
Video assistant referee:
Jorge Antonio Pérez (Veracruz)
Assistant video assistant referee:
Guillermo Pacheco Larios (Sonora)

==== Statistics ====
Statistic	UANL	Guadalajara
Goals scored	0	0
Total shots	14	7
Shots on target	1	1
Saves	1	1
Ball possession	67%	33%
Corner kicks	2	2
Fouls committed	13	12
Offsides	0	1
Yellow cards	3	4
Red cards	0	0

=== Second leg ===
28 May 2023
19:35 CST (UTC−6)

Guadalajara	2–3 (a.e.t.)	UANL
Alvarado 11'; Guzmán 20'	Report	Gignac 65' (pen.); Córdova 71'; Pizarro 110'

Estadio Akron, Zapopan
Attendance: 42,182
Referee: César Arturo Ramos (Sinaloa)

UANL won 3–2 on aggregate.

==== Details ====
Guadalajara	UANL

GK	23	(Mexico) Miguel Jiménez
DF	2	(Mexico) Alan Mozo		(substituted off) 101'
DF	4	(Mexico) Antonio Briseño	(yellow card) 63'
DF	3	(Mexico) Gilberto Sepúlveda	(yellow card) 120+2' (yellow-red card) 120+3'
DF	13	(Mexico) Jesús Orozco	(yellow card) 29'
MF	20	(Mexico) Fernando Beltrán
MF	28	(Mexico) Fernando González		(substituted off) 101'
MF	25	(Mexico) Roberto Alvarado
MF	5	(Mexico) Víctor Guzmán (c)	(yellow card) 95'
MF	10	(Mexico) Alexis Vega	(yellow card) 45+1'	(substituted off) 61'
FW	18	(Mexico) Ronaldo Cisneros		(substituted off) 61'
Substitutions:
GK	27	(Mexico) Raúl Rangel
DF	17	(Mexico) Jesús Sánchez		(substituted on) 101'
DF	19	(Mexico) Alejandro Mayorga
DF	26	(Mexico) Cristian Calderón
DF	45	(Mexico) Raúl Martínez
MF	6	(Mexico) Pável Pérez		(substituted on) 61' (substituted off) 101'
MF	11	(Mexico) Isaác Brizuela		(substituted on) 61'
MF	29	(Mexico) Alan Torres		(substituted on) 101'
MF	30	(Mexico) Sergio Flores
FW	9	(Mexico) Daniel Ríos		(substituted on) 101'
Manager:
(Serbia) Veljko Paunović

GK	1	(Argentina) Nahuel Guzmán	(yellow card) 108'
DF	20	(Mexico) Javier Aquino
DF	19	(Argentina) Guido Pizarro (c)
DF	13	(Mexico) Diego Reyes
DF	14	(Mexico) Jesús Garza		(substituted off) 63'
MF	6	(Mexico) Juan Pablo Vigón		(substituted off) 46'
MF	5	(Brazil) Rafael Carioca		(substituted off) 90'
MF	23	(Colombia) Luis Quiñones	(yellow card) 37'
MF	17	(Mexico) Sebastián Córdova	(yellow card) 68' (yellow-red card) 117'
MF	16	(Mexico) Diego Lainez		(substituted off) 46'
FW	10	(France) André-Pierre Gignac
Substitutions:
GK	182	(Mexico) Arturo Delgado
DF	2	(Chile) Igor Lichnovsky
DF	3	(Brazil) Samir		(substituted on) 90'
DF	32	(Mexico) Vladimir Loroña
DF	184	(Mexico) Fernando Ordóñez
MF	8	(Uruguay) Fernando Gorriarán		(substituted on) 46'
MF	22	(Mexico) Raymundo Fulgencio
MF	201	(Mexico) Sebastián Fierro
FW	9	(Argentina) Nicolás Ibáñez		(substituted on) 63'
FW	11	(Uruguay) Nicolás López		(substituted on) 46'
Manager:
(Uruguay) Robert Dante Siboldi

Assistant referees:
Christian Kiabek Espinosa (Mexico City)
Marco Antonio Bisguerra (Guanajuato)
Fourth official:
Víctor Alfonso Cáceres (Chiapas)
Video assistant referee:
Érick Yair Miranda (Guanajuato)
Assistant video assistant referee:
Alberto Morín Méndez (Chihuahua)

==== Statistics ====
Statistic	Guadalajara	UANL
Goals scored	2	3
Total shots	10	24
Shots on target	7	9
Saves	5	5
Ball possession	36%	64%
Corner kicks	5	12
Fouls committed	23	10
Offsides	1	2
Yellow cards	4	2
Red cards	1	1

== Statistics ==
=== Goalscorers ===
There were 47 goals scored in 18 matches, for an average of 2.61 goals per match.

6 goals

- (Mexico) Sebastián Córdova (UANL)

3 goals

- (Brazil) Léo Bonatini (Atlético San Luis)

2 goals

- (France) André-Pierre Gignac (UANL)
- (Mexico) Édgar López (Toluca)
- (Argentina) Maximiliano Meza (Monterrey)
- (Chile) Diego Valdés (América)

1 goal

- (Mexico) Roberto Alvarado (Guadalajara)
- (Colombia) Cristian Arango (Pachuca)
- (Spain) Unai Bilbao (Atlético San Luis)
- (Mexico) Ronaldo Cisneros (Guadalajara)
- (Chile) Víctor Dávila (León)
- (Mexico) Roberto de la Rosa (Pachuca)
- (Brazil) Dória (Santos Laguna)
- (Uruguay) Leonardo Fernández (Toluca)
- (Brazil) Vitinho (Atlético San Luis)
- (Mexico) Rogelio Funes Mori (Monterrey)
- (Mexico) Javier Güémez (Atlético San Luis)
- (Mexico) Víctor Guzmán (Guadalajara)
- (Ecuador) Romario Ibarra (Pachuca)
- (Uruguay) Nicolás López (UANL)
- (Mexico) Raúl López (Santos Laguna)
- (Uruguay) Brian Lozano (Atlas)
- (Mexico) Alan Mozo (Guadalajara)
- (Mexico) Jesús Orozco (Guadalajara)
- (Argentina) Guido Pizarro (UANL)
- (Colombia) Harold Preciado (Santos Laguna)
- (Colombia) Julián Quiñones (Atlas)
- (Uruguay) Brian Rodríguez (América)
- (Uruguay) Jonathan Rodríguez (América)
- (Mexico) Marcel Ruiz (Toluca)
- (Mexico) Érick Sánchez (Pachuca)
- (Mexico) Gilberto Sepúlveda (Guadalajara)
- (Argentina) Leonardo Suárez (América)
- (Ecuador) Félix Torres (Santos Laguna)
- (Mexico) Juan Pablo Vigón (UANL)
- (United States) Alejandro Zendejas (América)

=== Assists ===
3 assists

- (Mexico) Roberto Alvarado (Guadalajara)

2 assists

- (Mexico) Javier Aquino (UANL)
- (Mexico) Ricardo Chávez (Atlético San Luis)
- (Spain) Álvaro Fidalgo (América)
- (Paraguay) Carlos González (Toluca)
- (Mexico) Diego Lainez (UANL)
- (Mexico) Diego Medina (Santos Laguna)
- (Uruguay) Juan Sanabria (Atlético San Luis)
- (Chile) Diego Valdés (América)
- (Mexico) Alexis Vega (Guadalajara)

1 assist

- (Mexico) Alfonso Alvarado (León)
- (Colombia) Brayan Angulo (Toluca)
- (Mexico) Fernando Beltrán (Guadalajara)
- (Argentina) Juan Brunetta (Santos Laguna)
- (Brazil) Vitinho (Atlético San Luis)
- (Argentina) Julio Furch (Atlas)
- (France) André-Pierre Gignac (UANL)
- (Mexico) Omar Govea (Monterrey)
- (Colombia) Avilés Hurtado (Pachuca)
- (Ecuador) Romario Ibarra (Pachuca)
- (Mexico) Miguel Layún (América)
- (Colombia) Julián Quiñones (Atlas)
- (Colombia) Luis Quiñones (UANL)
