= 2022–23 C.F. Pachuca season =

Pachuca
2022–23 season
- President: Armando Martínez Patiño
- Manager: Guillermo Almada
- Stadium: Estadio Hidalgo
- Apertura 2022: Regular phase: 4th Final phase: Champions
- Clausura 2023: Regular phase: 5th Final phase: Reclassification
- Top goalscorer: Nicolás Ibáñez (16 goals)
- Highest home attendance: 21,080 vs Toluca (30 October 2022)
Home colours	Away colours	Third colours
- All statistics correct as of 23 December 2022.

The 2022–23 C.F. Pachuca season, commonly referred to as Pachuca. The team will participate in the Liga MX.

After losing in the 2022 Clausura final, Pachuca won the 2022 Apertura championship, defeating Toluca 8–2 over the two legs. After an aggregate 2–2 score, Pachuca advanced from the quarter-finals by virtue of finishing ahead of Tigres during the regular phase.

== Players ==
=== Squad Information ===
Players and squad numbers last updated on 4 July 2022. Appearances include all competitions.
Note: Flags indicate national team as has been defined under FIFA eligibility rules. Players may hold more than one non-FIFA nationality.

No.	Nat.	Name	Date of birth (age)	Signed in	Previous club
Goalkeepers
31	(Mexico)	José Eulogio	11 February 2004 (age 22)	2021	(Mexico) Youth System
25	(Mexico)	Carlos Moreno	29 January 1998 (age 28)	2018	(Mexico) Youth System
5	(Argentina)	Oscar Ustari	3 July 1986 (age 40)	2020	(Uruguay) Liverpool de Montevideo
Defenders
2	(Mexico)	Kevin Álvarez	15 January 1999 (age 27)	2018	(Mexico) Youth System
22	(Argentina)	Gustavo Cabral	14 October 1985 (age 41)	2019	(Spain) Celta de Vigo
14	(Mexico)	José Castillo Pérez	2 December 2001 (age 24)	2021	(Mexico) Youth System
15	(Mexico)	Miguel Ángel Herrera	3 April 1989 (age 37)	2012	(Mexico) Youth System
23	(Colombia)	Óscar Murillo	18 April 1988 (age 38)	2016	(Colombia) Atlético Nacional
4	(Mexico)	Miguel Tapias	9 January 1997 (age 29)	2016	(Mexico) Youth System
Midfielders
24	(Mexico)	Luis Chávez	15 January 1996 (age 30)	2019	(Mexico) Tijuana
5	(Mexico)	Víctor Guzmán	3 February 1995 (age 31)	2015	(Mexico) Youth System
18	(Colombia)	Marino Hinestroza	8 July 2002 (age 24)	2022	(Colombia) América de Cali
30	(Ecuador)	Romario Ibarra	24 September 1994 (age 32)	2020	(United States) Minnesota United
16	(Mexico)	Javier Eduardo López	17 September 1994 (age 32)	2022	(Mexico) Guadalajara
19	(Spain)	Paulino	27 June 1997 (age 29)	2022	(Spain) Málaga
Forwards
9	(Mexico)	Roberto de la Rosa	4 January 2000 (age 26)	2017	(Mexico) Youth System
35	(Mexico)	Bryan González	10 April 2003 (age 23)	2020	(Mexico) Youth System
11	(Colombia)	Avilés Hurtado	20 April 1987 (age 39)	2021	(Mexico) Monterrey
11	(Argentina)	Nicolás Ibáñez	23 August 1994 (age 32)	2021	(Spain) Atlético Madrid
10	(Mexico)	Érick Sánchez	27 September 1999 (age 27)	2016	(Mexico) Youth System

== Transfers and loans ==
=== Transfers In ===
Date	Pos.	Player	From	Type	Source
1 January 2023	FW	(Argentina) Mauro Quiroga	(Ecuador) Emelec	Transfer	

=== Transfers Out ===
Date	Pos.	Player	To	Type	Source
30 June 2022	MF	(Mexico) Pablo López	(Mexico) Cancún F.C.	Loan	
25 July 2022	DF	(Mexico) Daniel Alonso Aceves	(Spain) Real Oviedo	Loan	
28 July 2022	MF	(Uruguay) Jesús Trindade	(Brazil) Coritiba	Loan	
3 January 2023	MF	(Mexico) Víctor Guzmán	(Mexico) Guadalajara	Transfer	

== Competitions ==
=== Overview ===
Competition	First match	Last match	Starting round	Record							
Competition	First match	Last match	Starting round	Pld	W	D	L	GF	GA	GD	Win %
Apertura 2022	4 July 2022	TBD	Matchday 1	17	9	5	3	28	15	+13	52.94
Clausura 2023	January 2023	TBD	Matchday 1	0	0	0	0	0	0	+0	—
Total				17	9	5	3	28	15	+13	52.94

Last updated: 1 October 2022
Source: Mediotiempo.com

=== Liga MX ===
==== Torneo Apertura ====
===== League table =====
Pos	Team	Pld	W	D	L	GF	GA	GD	Pts	Qualification
2	Monterrey	17	10	5	2	29	13	+16	35	Qualification for the quarter-finals
3	Santos Laguna	17	10	3	4	38	21	+17	33	Qualification for the quarter-finals
4	Pachuca (C)	17	9	5	3	28	15	+13	32	Qualification for the quarter-finals
5	UANL	17	9	3	5	24	14	+10	30	Qualification for the reclassification
6	Toluca	17	7	6	4	27	23	+4	27	Qualification for the reclassification

Source: Liga MX
Rules for classification: 1) Points; 2) Goal difference; 3) Number of goals scored; 4) Head-to-head results between tied teams; 5) Number of goals scored away; 6) Highest relegation coefficient; 7) Fair Play points
(C) Champions

===== Results summary =====
Overall								Home						Away					
Pld	W	D	L	GF	GA	GD	Pts	W	D	L	GF	GA	GD	W	D	L	GF	GA	GD
17	9	5	3	28	15	+13	32	6	2	1	17	6	+11	3	3	2	11	9	+2

Last updated: 1 October 2022.
Source: Soccerway

===== Results round by round =====
Round	1	2	3	4	5	6	7	8	9	10	11	12	13	14	15	16	17	18	19	20	21	22	23
Ground	H	A	H	H	A	A	H	H	H	H	A	H	A	H	A	A	A	A	H	H	A	A	H
Result	W	W	D	D	L	D	W	L	W	W	W	W	D	W	L	W	D	L	W	W	W	W	W
Position	3	3	2	5	6	7	4	4	9	6	4	3	4	3	3	3	4	QF	QF	SF	SF	F	F

Updated to match(es) played on 1 October 2022. Source: Mediotiempo.com
A = Away; H = Home; W = Win; D = Draw; L = Loss; F = Final; QF = Quarter-finals; SF = Semi-finals

==== Matches ====
The league fixtures were announced on 29 May 2022.

4 July 2022 1	C.F. Pachuca	2–0	Querétaro	Pachuca
21:00 CT	Ibáñez 25'; Hurtado 57'	Report	Mendoza (yellow card) 29'; Hernández (yellow card) 34'; Martínez (yellow card) 40'; López (yellow card) 88'	Stadium: Estadio Hidalgo; Referee: César Arturo Ramos

=== Leagues Cup ===
Pachuca will enter the Leagues Cup in the Round of 32

==== Knockout round ====
August 2	Pachuca (Mexico)	0–0 (3–5 p)	(United States) Houston Dynamo FC	Houston, Texas
8:00 PM CDT	Rodríguez (yellow card) 62'; Castillo (yellow card) 68'; Sánchez (yellow card) 69'; Cabral (yellow card) 71'	Report	Artur (yellow card) 53'; Herrera (yellow card) 60'; Escobar (yellow card) 63'	Stadium: Shell Energy Stadium; Attendance: 10,438; Referee: Edgar Allan Morales Olvera
	Penalties
	(penalty scored) Cabral; (penalty scored) I. Hernández; (penalty scored) Sánchez; (penalty missed) Figueroa		Úlfarsson (penalty scored); Quiñones (penalty scored); Herrera (penalty scored); Dorsey (penalty scored); Caicedo (penalty scored)
