= Alan Rodríguez =

Alan Rodríguez may refer to:

- Alan Rodríguez (Argentine footballer) (born 1993), Argentine football defender
- Alan Rodríguez (footballer, born 1996), Mexican football midfielder
- Alan Rodríguez (Paraguayan footballer), (born 2000), left-back and midfielder
- Alan Rodríguez (Uruguayan footballer) (born 2000), Uruguayan football midfielder
