= Alan Rodríguez (Argentine footballer) =

Argentine footballer

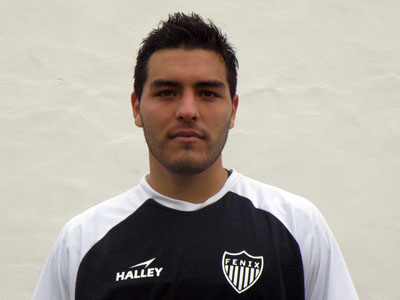

Personal information
- Full name: Alan Gabriel Rodríguez
- Date of birth: 1 May 1993 (age 33)
- Place of birth: San Isidro, Argentina
- Height: 1.86 m (6 ft 1 in)
- Position: Defender

Youth career
- 2008–2009: Barcelona Juniors Luján
- 2010–2013: All Boys
- 2013: Huracán

Senior career*
Years	Team	Apps	(Gls)
2014–2015	Fénix	3	(0)
2016	Flandria	0	(0)
2016	Morell	0	(0)
2016–2017	Gavà	11	(0)
2017	Avezzano	0	(0)
- * Club domestic league appearances and goals as of 16 July 2017

Alan Gabriel Rodríguez (born 1 May 1993) is an Argentine footballer who last played for Italian club Avezzano Calcio as a central defender or a left back.

== Club career ==
Born in San Isidro, Buenos Aires, Rodríguez played youth football for three clubs including All Boys and Huracán, never appeared in a senior match for both clubs. In June 2014 he joined Club Atlético Fénix in the Primera B Metropolitana, but only made his professional debut on 17 February of the following year by starting in a 1–2 home loss against Club Atlético Brown.

In January 2016 Rodríguez moved to CSyD Flandria, but left the club the following month to join CF Reus Deportiu. Initially assigned to the farm team CD Morell, he failed to make a senior appearance for both sides.

On 14 July 2016, Rodríguez signed for Segunda División B side CF Gavà.
