= Maximiliano Araújo =

Uruguayan footballer (born 2000)

Personal information
- Full name: Maximiliano Javier Araújo Vilches
- Date of birth: 15 February 2000 (age 26)
- Place of birth: Montevideo, Uruguay
- Height: 1.76 m (5 ft 9 in)
- Positions: Left-back; left midfielder

Team information
- Current team: Sporting CP
- Number: 20

Youth career
- Montevideo Wanderers

Senior career*
Years	Team	Apps	(Gls)
2018–2019	Montevideo Wanderers	33	(1)
2020–2022	Puebla	83	(8)
2023–2024	Toluca	55	(10)
2024–	Sporting CP	59	(9)

International career^{‡}
2018–2019	Uruguay U20	28	(0)
2019	Uruguay U22	4	(0)
2020	Uruguay U23	6	(0)
2023–	Uruguay	35	(9)
Medal record
Men's football
Representing Uruguay
Copa América
Third place	2024 United States
- * Club domestic league appearances and goals as of 23 August 2026 ‡ National team caps and goals as of 13 November 2026

Maximiliano "Maxi" Javier Araújo Vilches (born 15 February 2000) is a Uruguayan professional footballer who plays as a left-back or left wing-back for Primeira Liga club Sporting CP and the Uruguay national team.

== Club career ==
Araújo is a youth academy graduate of Montevideo Wanderers. He made his professional debut for the club on 11 March 2018 in a 2–1 league win against Montevideo City Torque.

At the end of December 2019 it was confirmed, Araújo had signed a deal until the end of 2023 with Liga MX club Puebla.

On 27 August 2024, Araújo joined Primeira Liga club Sporting CP on a five-year contract. On 5 November 2024, Araújo scored his debut goal in the UEFA Champions League against Manchester City in a 4–1 victory. On 4 August 2026, he extended his contract until 2030.

== International career ==
As a youth international, Araújo has represented Uruguay at the 2019 South American U-20 Championship, 2019 FIFA U-20 World Cup, 2019 Pan American Games and the 2020 CONMEBOL Pre-Olympic Tournament.

On 21 October 2022, Araújo was named in Uruguay's 55-man preliminary squad for the 2022 FIFA World Cup. However, he was not included in the final squad, which was announced three weeks later. In June 2023, he received his first call-up to the senior team for friendly matches against Nicaragua and Cuba. He made his debut on 14 June in a 4–1 win against Nicaragua.

On 31 May 2026, Araújo was named in Uruguay's 26-man squad for the 2026 FIFA World Cup. On 15 June, in Uruguay's opener against Saudi Arabia, Araújo scored his first World Cup goal with equalizer to ensure a 1–1 draw. In Uruguay's second group-stage match against Cape Verde, he registered a goal and an assist, becoming the first Uruguayan player to achieve this feat at a World Cup since Juan Mujica in 1970.

== Personal life ==
He is the elder brother of fellow professional footballer César Araújo. In June 2026, unverified claims circulated on social media, primarily in India, alleging that Araújo had family origins in Portuguese Goa and that his grandfather had emigrated to Uruguay. However, these claims were not supported by reliable sources and were publicly denied by people close to him.

== Career statistics ==
=== Club ===
As of match played 24 May 2026

Appearances and goals by club, season and competition
Club	Season	League			National cup (Note: Includes Taça de Portugal)		League cup (Note: Includes Taça da Liga)		Continental		Other		Total	
Club	Season	Division	Apps	Goals	Apps	Goals	Apps	Goals	Apps	Goals	Apps	Goals	Apps	Goals
Montevideo Wanderers	2018	Uruguayan Primera División	14	0	0	0	—		0	0	—		14	0
Montevideo Wanderers	2019	Uruguayan Primera División	19	1	0	0	—		0	0	—		19	1
Montevideo Wanderers	Total		33	1	0	0	—		0	0	—		33	1
Puebla	2019–20	Liga MX	1	0	0	0	—		—		—		1	0
Puebla	2020–21	Liga MX	25	2	—		—		—		—		25	2
Puebla	2021–22	Liga MX	38	4	—		—		—		—		38	4
Puebla	2022–23	Liga MX	19	2	—		—		—		—		19	2
Puebla	Total		83	8	0	0	—		—		—		83	8
Toluca	2022–23	Liga MX	19	6	—		—		—		—		19	6
Toluca	2023–24	Liga MX	34	3	—		—		2 (Note: Appearances in CONCACAF Champions Cup)	0	4 (Note: Appearances in Leagues Cup)	0	40	3
Toluca	2024–25	Liga MX	2	1	—		—		—		3	1	5	2
Toluca	Total		55	10	—		—		2	0	7	1	64	11
Sporting CP	2024–25	Primeira Liga	28	3	5	0	3	0	10 (Note: Appearances in UEFA Champions League)	1	—		46	4
Sporting CP	2025–26	Primeira Liga	29	5	5	0	5	0	11	2	1 (Note: Appearance in Supertaça Cândido de Oliveira)	0	47	7
Sporting CP	Total		57	8	10	0	4	0	21	3	1	0	93	11
Career total			228	27	10	0	8	0	23	3	8	0	273	30

=== International ===
As of match played 13 November 2026

Appearances and goals by national team and year
National team	Year	Apps	Goals
Uruguay	2023	7	1
Uruguay	2024	13	2
Uruguay	2025	6	0
Uruguay	2026	9	6
Total		35	9

Scores and results list Uruguay's goal tally first, score column indicates score after each Araújo goal.

List of international goals scored by Maximiliano Araújo
No.	Date	Venue	Cap	Opponent	Score	Result	Competition
1	20 June 2023	Estadio Centenario, Montevideo, Uruguay	2	Cuba	2–0	2–0	Friendly
2	23 June 2024	Hard Rock Stadium, Miami Gardens, United States	9	Panama	1–0	3–1	2024 Copa América
3	27 June 2024	MetLife Stadium, East Rutherford, United States	10	Bolivia	3–0	5–0	2024 Copa América
4	15 June 2026	Hard Rock Stadium, Miami Gardens, United States	29	Saudi Arabia	1–1	1–1	2026 FIFA World Cup
5	21 June 2026	Hard Rock Stadium, Miami Gardens, United States	30	Cape Verde	1–1	2–2	2026 FIFA World Cup
6	24 September 2026	Miyagi Stadium, Rifu, Japan	32	Japan	1–1	1–3	Friendly
7	6 October 2026	Salt Lake Stadium, Kolkata, India	34	India	2–1	6–1	Friendly
8	6 October 2026	Salt Lake Stadium, Kolkata, India	34	India	4–1	6–1	Friendly
9	13 November 2026	La Bombonera, Buenos Aires, Argentina	35	Argentina	2–1	2–1	Friendly

== Honours ==
Sporting CP

- Primeira Liga: 2024–25
- Taça de Portugal: 2024–25

Uruguay

- Copa América third place: 2024

Individual

- Primeira Liga Team of the Season: 2025–26
