= Tiago Volpi =

Brazilian footballer

Personal information
- Full name: Tiago Luis Volpi
- Date of birth: 19 December 1990 (age 35)
- Place of birth: Blumenau, Santa Catarina, Brazil
- Height: 1.88 m (6 ft 2 in)
- Position: Goalkeeper

Team information
- Current team: Red Bull Bragantino
- Number: 18

Youth career
- 2008: Fluminense
- 2009: São José-RS

Senior career*
Years	Team	Apps	(Gls)
2010–2012	São José-RS	27	(0)
2011	→ Luverdense (loan)	11	(0)
2012–2014	Figueirense	84	(0)
2015–2019	Querétaro	141	(0)
2019	→ São Paulo (loan)	54	(0)
2020–2022	São Paulo	105	(0)
2022–2025	Toluca	108	(15)
2025–2026	Grêmio	48	(2)
2026–	Red Bull Bragantino	22	(2)
- * Club domestic league appearances and goals as of 8 October 2026

Tiago Luis Volpi (born 19 December 1990) is a Brazilian professional footballer who plays as a goalkeeper for Red Bull Bragantino.

== Career ==
=== Early career ===
Volpi started his career at Fluminense in 2008, before moving to São José a year later, he was loaned to Luverdense in 2011.

=== Querétaro ===
On 20 December 2014, Volpi was signed by Mexican club Querétaro.

On 16 January 2015, Volpi made his officially debut with Querétaro against Leones Negros UdeG, Gallos Blancos won 1-0. The first tournament he played with the team, Volpi, accompanied with Brazilian teammates Ronaldinho, Sinha, William, Danilinho, and Camilo Sanvezzo help the team reach the first final in the franchise history, the team won the second-leg game celebrated in the Corregidora Stadium with a 3-0 final score, but Club Santos Laguna won with an aggregate scoreline of 5-3. The Mexico national team expressed interest in acquiring Volpi for naturalisation, before he left Querétaro.

=== São Paulo ===
On 23 December 2018, Volpi returned to Brazil, signing for São Paulo on a one-year loan with an buy-out option.

One year later, on 24 December 2019, São Paulo announced the permanent signing of Volpi, who signed a contract running until December 2023. São Paulo paid US$5 million to Mexican side Querétaro for Volpi's permanent transfer.

=== Toluca ===
On 14 May 2022, Volpi signed for Toluca, returning to Mexico after three years. He scored a penalty against Santos Laguna on 13 October 2022, that contributed to a 4–3 victory for Toluca. On 27 July, Volpi scored a penalty in Toluca's debut in the 2023 Leagues Cup, totaling seven goals with the club. He was Toluca's official penalty taker and scored 15 goals during his tenure.

== Career statistics ==
As of 12 May 2024

Club	Season	League			State League		National Cup		Continental		Other		Total	
Club	Season	Division	Apps	Goals	Apps	Goals	Apps	Goals	Apps	Goals	Apps	Goals	Apps	Goals
São José-RS	2010	Série D	5	0	4	0	—		—		—		9	0
São José-RS	2011	Gaúcho	—		4	0	—		—		—		4	0
São José-RS	2012	Gaúcho	—		14	0	—		—		—		14	0
São José-RS	Total		5	0	22	0	—		—		—		27	0
Luverdense (loan)	2011	Série C	11	0	—		—		—		—		11	0
Figueirense	2012	Série A	3	0	—		—		—		—		3	0
Figueirense	2013	Série B	27	0	0	0	2	0	—		—		29	0
Figueirense	2014	Série A	37	0	17	0	2	0	—		—		56	0
Figueirense	Total		67	0	17	0	4	0	—		—		88	0
Querétaro	2014–15	Liga MX	22	0	—		1	0	—		—		23	0
Querétaro	2015–16	Liga MX	33	0	—		0	0	4	0	—		37	0
Querétaro	2016–17	Liga MX	33	0	—		6	0	—		1	0	40	0
Querétaro	2017–18	Liga MX	34	0	—		2	0	—		—		36	0
Querétaro	2018–19	Liga MX	19	0	—		2	0	—		—		21	0
Querétaro	Total		141	0	—		11	0	4	0	1	0	157	0
São Paulo (loan)	2019	Série A	37	0	17	0	2	0	2	0	—		58	0
São Paulo	2020	Série A	38	0	12	0	6	0	8	0	—		64	0
São Paulo	2021	Série A	38	0	13	0	5	0	8	0	—		64	0
São Paulo	2022	Série A	0	0	4	0	0	0	3	0	—		7	0
São Paulo	Total		113	0	46	0	13	0	21	0	—		193	0
Toluca	2022–23	Liga MX	41	4	—		—		—		4	2	45	6
Toluca	2023–24	Liga MX	36	9	—		—		2	0	4	0	42	9
Toluca	Total		77	13	—		—		2	0	8	2	108	15
Career total			414	13	85	0	28	0	27	0	9	2	563	15

== List of goals scored ==
Following, is the list with the goals scored by Tiago Volpi:

#	Date	Venue	Host team	Result	Away team	Competition	Score	Type	Opponent goalkeeper
1	October 13, 2022	Estadio Nemesio Díez, Toluca	Toluca	4–3	Santos Laguna	Apertura 2022 Liga MX final phase	4–3	Penalty kick	Carlos Acevedo
2	April 7, 2023	Estadio Cuauhtémoc, Puebla	Puebla	1–2	Toluca	2022–23 Liga MX season	0–2	Penalty kick	Antony Silva
3	April 23, 2023	Estadio Nemesio Díez, Toluca	Toluca	1–1	Juárez	2022–23 Liga MX season	1–0	Penalty kick	Alfredo Talavera
4	April 30, 2023	Estadio Nemesio Díez, Toluca	Toluca	3–0	Necaxa	2022–23 Liga MX season	3–0	Penalty kick	Rafael Ramírez
5	July 8, 2023	Estadio Azteca, Mexico City	Cruz Azul	0–2	Toluca	2023–24 Liga MX season	0–1	Penalty kick	Sebastián Jurado
6	July 16, 2023	Estadio Nemesio Díez, Toluca	Toluca	2–4	Juárez	2023–24 Liga MX season	2–2	Penalty kick	Alfredo Talavera
7	July 27, 2023	Geodis Park, Nashville	Nashville	3–4	Toluca	2023 Leagues Cup group stage	3–4	Penalty kick	Elliot Panicco
8	August 9, 2023	Allianz Field, Saint Paul, Minnesota	Minnesota	2–2	Toluca	2023 Leagues Cup Round of 16	2–2	Penalty kick	Dayne St. Clair
9	September 3, 2023	Estadio Nemesio Díez, Toluca	Toluca	5–0	Pachuca	2023–24 Liga MX season	1–0	Penalty kick	Carlos Moreno
10	October 8, 2023	Estadio Nemesio Díez, Toluca	Toluca	3–1	Querétaro	2023–24 Liga MX season	2–1	Penalty kick	Guillermo Allison
11	January 20, 2024	Estadio Nemesio Díez, Toluca	Toluca	4–1	Mazatlán	2023–24 Liga MX season	4–1	Penalty kick	Hugo González
12	February 21, 2024	Estadio Nemesio Díez, Toluca	Toluca	1–0	Santos Laguna	2023–24 Liga MX season	1–0	Penalty kick	Carlos Acevedo
13	March 2, 2024	Estadio Nemesio Díez, Toluca	Toluca	2–1	Tigres	2023–24 Liga MX season	2–1	Penalty kick	Nahuel Guzmán
14	March 16, 2024	Estadio Nemesio Díez, Toluca	Toluca	3–0	Pumas	2023–24 Liga MX season	2–0	Penalty kick	Julio González
15	March 30, 2024	Estadio Hidalgo, Pachuca	Pachuca	1–2	Toluca	2023–24 Liga MX season	1–2	Penalty kick	Carlos Moreno
16	August 31, 2025	Estádio do Maracanã, Rio de Janeiro	Flamengo	1–1	Grêmio	2025 Campeonato Brasileiro Série A	1–1	Penalty kick	Agustín Rossi
17	September 24, 2025	Arena do Grêmio, Porto Alegre	Grêmio	1–1	Botafogo	2025 Campeonato Brasileiro Série A	1–1	Penalty kick	Léo Linck
18	May 17, 2026	Estádio Cícero de Souza Marques, Bragança Paulista	Red Bull Bragantino	2–0	Vitória	2026 Campeonato Brasileiro Série A	1–0	Penalty kick	Lucas Arcanjo

== Honours ==
Figueirense

- Campeonato Catarinense: 2014

Querétaro

- Copa MX: Apertura 2016
- Supercopa MX: 2017

São Paulo

- Campeonato Paulista: 2021

Grêmio

- Recopa Gaúcha: 2025

=== Individual ===
- Campeonato Brasileiro Série A most clean sheets: 2019

== See also ==
- List of goalscoring goalkeepers
