= Jordan Sierra =

Ecuadorian footballer (born 1997)

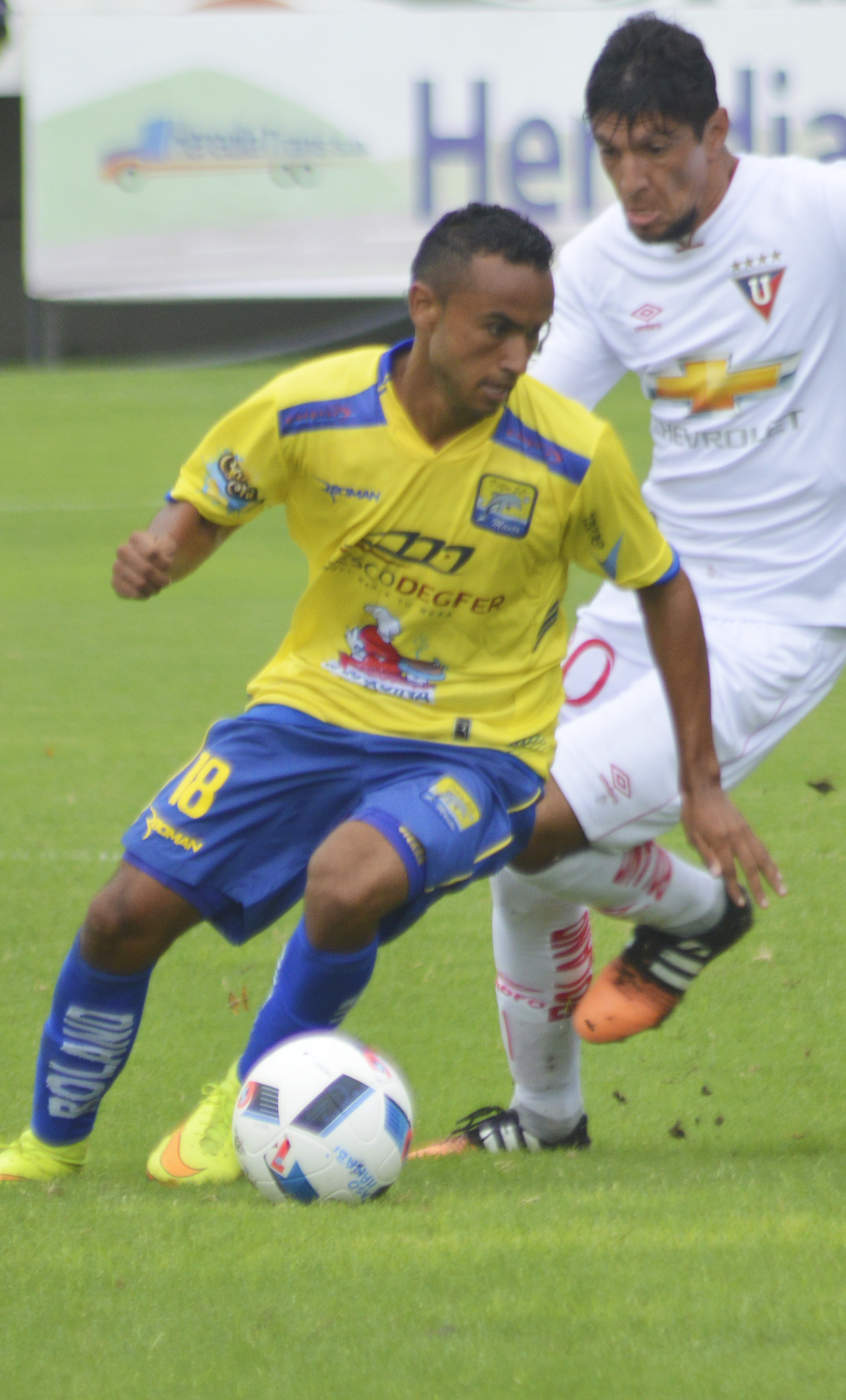
- Sierra in action with Delfín in 2016

Personal information
- Full name: Jordan Steeven Sierra Flores
- Date of birth: 23 April 1997 (age 29)
- Place of birth: Manta, Ecuador
- Height: 1.69 m (5 ft 7 in)
- Position: Midfielder

Senior career*
Years	Team	Apps	(Gls)
2014–2015	Manta	?	(2)
2015–2018	Delfín S.C.	74	(7)
2018–2021	Tigres UANL	17	(0)
2018	→ BUAP (loan)	25	(0)
2019	→ Querétaro (loan)	28	(3)
2022–2023	Toluca	38	(2)
2023	→ Juárez (loan)	16	(1)
2023–2024	Querétaro	31	(0)
2024–2026	Mazatlán	30	(2)

International career^{‡}
2017	Ecuador U20	12	(1)
2017–2019	Ecuador	3	(0)
- * Club domestic league appearances and goals as of 28 March 2025 ‡ National team caps and goals as of 14 November 2019

Jordan Steeven Sierra Flores (born 23 April 1997) is an Ecuadorian footballer who plays as a midfielder.

== International career ==
He made his debut for Ecuador on 22 February 2017 in a match against the Honduras.

== Honours ==
UANL

- CONCACAF Champions League: 2020
