= Jean Meneses =

Chilean footballer (born 1993)

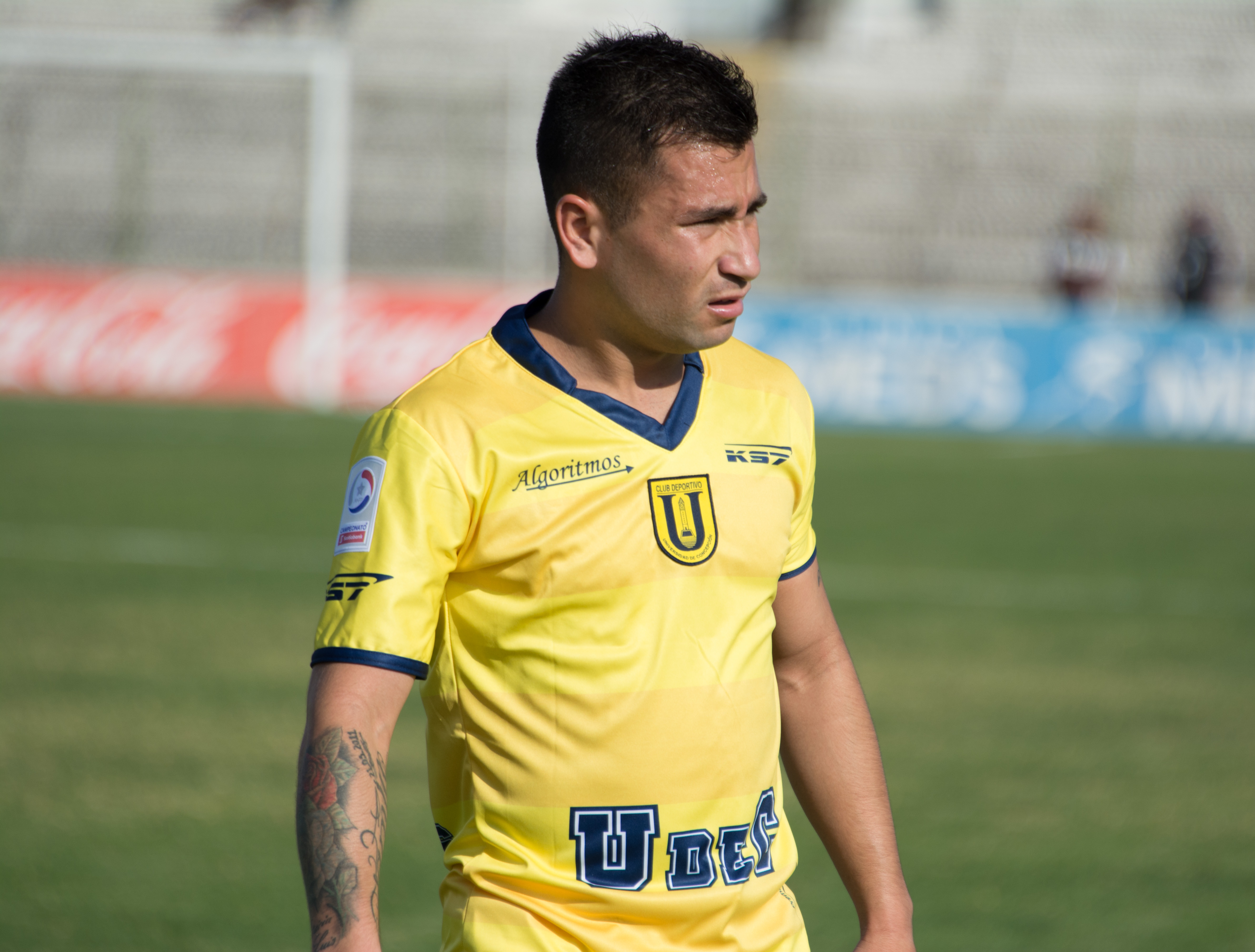
- Meneses with Universidad de Concepción in 2018

Personal information
- Full name: Jean David Meneses Villarroel
- Date of birth: 16 March 1993 (age 33)
- Place of birth: Quillota, Chile
- Height: 1.63 m (5 ft 4 in)
- Position: Winger

Team information
- Current team: Deportes Limache
- Number: 16

Youth career
- San Luis

Senior career*
Years	Team	Apps	(Gls)
2012–2015	San Luis	104	(13)
2016–2019	Universidad de Concepción	73	(19)
2018–2019	→ León (loan)	28	(4)
2019–2022	León	105	(54)
2022–2024	Toluca	80	(15)
2024–2025	Vasco da Gama	12	(0)
2026–	Deportes Limache	0	(0)

International career^{‡}
2019-	Chile	23	(3)
- * Club domestic league appearances and goals as of 23 December 2025 ‡ National team caps and goals as of 10 September 2024

Jean David Meneses Villarroel (born 16 March 1993) is a Chilean professional footballer who plays as a winger for Deportes Limache.

== Club career ==
In March 2018, he came to international attention for his blatant dive to win a late penalty, which was converted for a 2–1 victory against rivals Colo-Colo in the Chilean Primera División.

On 1 August 2018, Meneses was loaned out to Club León for the rest of the season. In May 2019, it was confirmed, that Club León had redeemed the player and he would stay at the club.

On 27 August 2024, Meneses moved to Brazil and joined Vasco da Gama. He ended his contract in December 2025.

On 30 December 2025, Meneses joined Deportes Limache.

== International career ==
He made his Chile national team debut on 10 September 2019 in a friendly against Honduras. He started the game and was substituted in the 64th minute.

== Personal life ==
His son, Benjamín, is a footballer from the San Luis de Quillota youth ranks who became the youngest player in the club history to make his professional debut at the age of 15 years, 2 months and 30 days in the Copa Chile match against Everton on 20 June 2026.

== Career statistics ==
=== International ===
As of match played 10 September 2024

Appearances and goals by national team and year
National team	Year	Apps	Goals
Chile	2019	2	1
Chile	2020	2	0
Chile	2021	14	2
Chile	2022	5	0
Chile	2024	1	0
Total		23	3

As of match played 9 September 2021. Scores and results list Chile's goal tally first.

No.	Date	Venue	Opponent	Score	Result	Competition
1.	15 October 2019	Estadio José Rico Pérez, Alicante, Spain	Guinea	1–1	3–2	Friendly
2.	26 March 2021	Estadio El Teniente, Rancagua, Chile	Bolivia	2–1	2–1	Friendly
3.	9 September 2021	Estadio Metropolitano Roberto Meléndez, Barranquilla, Colombia	Colombia	1–2	1–3	2022 FIFA World Cup qualification

== Honours ==
León

- Liga MX: Guardianes 2020
- Leagues Cup: 2021
