= Haret Ortega =

Mexican footballer (born 2000)

Personal information
- Full name: Óscar Haret Ortega Gatica
- Date of birth: 19 May 2000 (age 26)
- Place of birth: Iguala, Guerrero, Mexico
- Height: 1.93 m (6 ft 4 in)
- Position: Centre-back

Team information
- Current team: Juárez
- Number: 23

Senior career*
Years	Team	Apps	(Gls)
2019–2020	América	3	(0)
2020–2021	→ Toluca (loan)	18	(1)
2021–2023	Toluca	43	(5)
2023–	Juárez	23	(1)
2025–2026	→ Santos Laguna (loan)	21	(1)

International career^{‡}
2017–2018	Mexico U17	1	(0)
2021	Mexico	1	(0)
Medal record
Men's football
Representing Mexico
CONCACAF Under-17 Championship
First place	2017 Panama	Team
- * Club domestic league appearances and goals as of 27 September 2026 ‡ National team caps and goals as of 28 October 2021

Óscar Haret Ortega Gatica (born 19 May 2000) is a Mexican professional footballer who plays as a centre-back for Liga MX club Juárez.

== Club career ==
=== América ===
On 24 March 2018, Ortega's debut for Mexican side América came on a friendly game coming in as a sub on the 68th minute for Enrique Cedillo against Tijuana. The game ended on a 2–2 draw and he was wearing number 29.

On 18 January 2020, Ortega made his official Liga MX debut playing the full match for América against Tigres UANL after it was announced that Bruno Valdez was ineligible to start the match due to injury.

=== Toluca ===
On 17 June 2020, Ortega joined Liga MX side Toluca on a loan agreement for the remainder of the season with the option for a permanent deal.

== International career ==
On 27 October 2021, Ortega made his senior national team debut under Gerardo Martino in a friendly match against Ecuador.

== Career statistics ==
=== Club ===
As of match played on 27 September 2026

Club	Season	League			Cup		Continental		Other		Total	
Club	Season	Division	Apps	Goals	Apps	Goals	Apps	Goals	Apps	Goals	Apps	Goals
América	2018–19	Liga MX	—		2	0	—		—		2	0
América	2019–20	Liga MX	3	0	—		—		—		3	0
América	Total		3	0	2	0	—		—		5	0
Toluca (loan)	2020–21	Liga MX	18	1	1 (Note: Appearance in Copa GNP por México)	0	—		—		19	1
Toluca	2021–22	Liga MX	29	4	—		—		—		29	4
Toluca	2022–23	Liga MX	14	1	1 (Note: Appearance in Copa Sky por México)	0	—		—		15	1
Toluca	Total		43	5	2	0	—		—		45	5
Juárez	2023–24	Liga MX	5	0	—		—		3 (Note: Appearances in Leagues Cup)	0	8	0
Juárez	2024–25	Liga MX	13	1	—		—		3	0	16	1
Juárez	2026–27	Liga MX	5	0	—		—		2	0	7	0
Juárez	Total		23	1	—		—		8	0	31	1
Santos Laguna (loan)	2025–26	Liga MX	21	1	—		—		2	0	23	1
Career total			108	8	4	0	0	0	10	0	122	8

=== International ===
As of match played on 28 October 2021

National team	Year	Apps	Goals
Mexico	2021	1	0
Total		1	0

== Honours ==
Mexico U17

- CONCACAF U-17 Championship: 2017
