= Andrés Mosquera (footballer, born 1990) =

Colombian footballer

Personal information
- Full name: Andrés Felipe Mosquera Guardia
- Date of birth: 20 February 1990 (age 36)
- Place of birth: Antioquia, Colombia
- Height: 1.82 m (6 ft 0 in)
- Position: Defender

Team information
- Current team: América de Cali
- Number: 4

Youth career
- Independiente Medellín

Senior career*
Years	Team	Apps	(Gls)
2008–2017	Independiente Medellín	146	(6)
2012	→ América de Cali (loan)	23	(0)
2017–2022	León	141	(4)
2022–2023	Toluca	56	(2)
2024–	América de Cali	50	(1)
- * Club domestic league appearances and goals as of 11 December 2025

Andrés Felipe Mosquera Guardia (born 20 February 1990) is a Colombian professional footballer who plays as a defender for América de Cali.

== Honours ==
León

- Liga MX: Guardianes 2020
- Leagues Cup: 2021
