= Leonardo Fernández (Uruguayan footballer) =

Uruguayan footballer (born 1998)

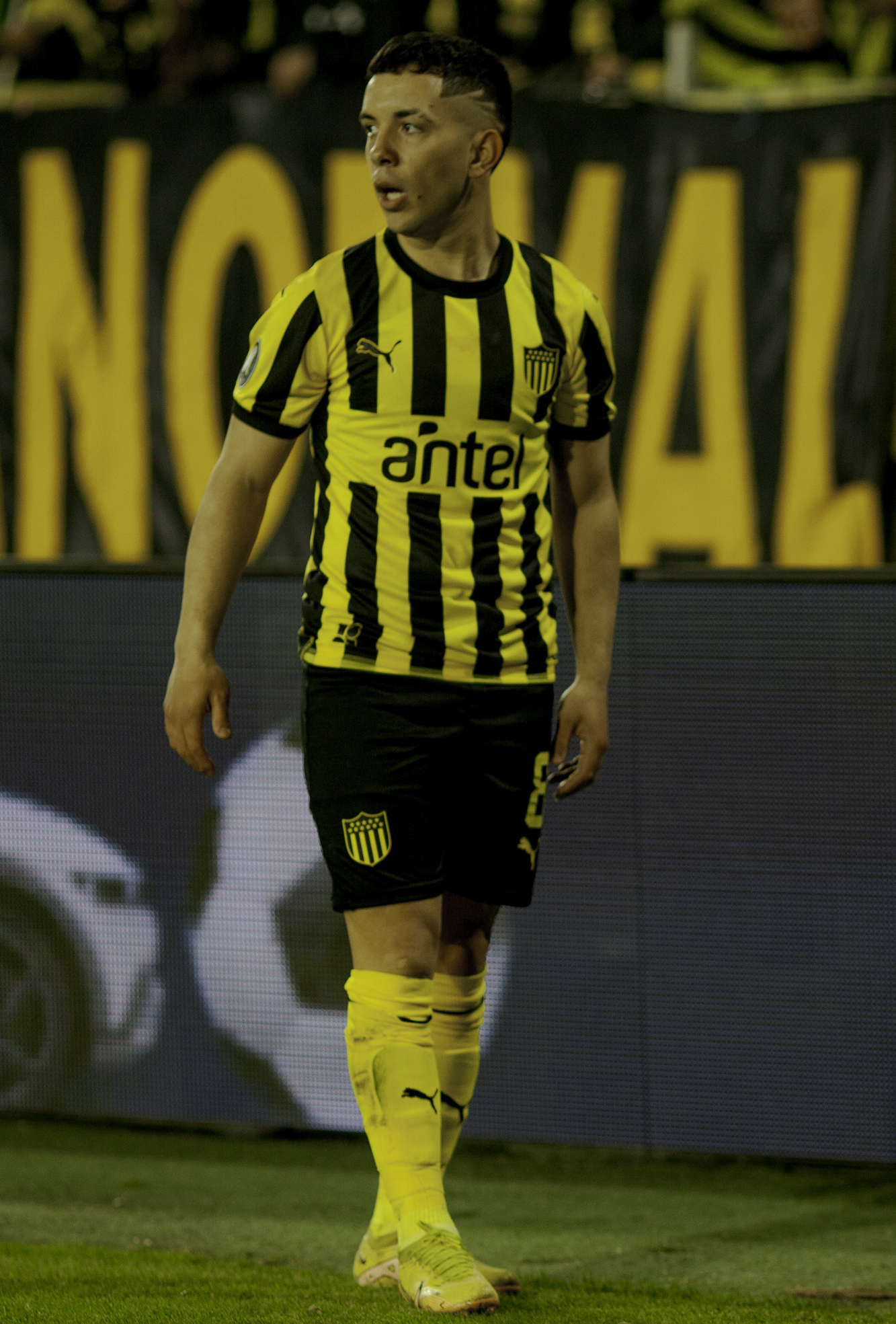
- Fernández with Peñarol in 2024

Personal information
- Full name: Leonardo Cecilio Fernández López
- Date of birth: 8 November 1998 (age 28)
- Place of birth: Montevideo, Uruguay
- Height: 1.67 m (5 ft 6 in)
- Position: Attacking midfielder

Team information
- Current team: Peñarol
- Number: 10

Youth career
- Amanecer
- 2011–2015: Fénix

Senior career*
Years	Team	Apps	(Gls)
2015–2019	Fénix	90	(25)
2019–2021	Tigres UANL	35	(1)
2019	→ Universidad de Chile (loan)	7	(1)
2020	→ Toluca (loan)	10	(8)
2022–2025	Toluca	54	(17)
2023	→ Fluminense (loan)	18	(1)
2024	→ Peñarol (loan)	32	(15)
2025–	Peñarol	31	(9)

International career
2012–2013	Uruguay U15	15	(2)
2014–2015	Uruguay U17	19	(5)
2017	Uruguay U20	1	(0)
2019	Uruguay U22	5	(4)
- * Club domestic league appearances and goals as of 26 October 2025

Leonardo "Leo" Cecilio Fernández López (born 8 November 1998) is a Uruguayan professional footballer who plays as an attacking midfielder for Liga AUF Uruguaya club Peñarol.

== Club career ==
=== Fénix ===
Born in Montevideo, Fernández joined Fénix's youth setup in 2011, from lowly CSyD Amanecer. On 31 May 2015, aged just 16, he made his first team – and Primera División – debut, coming on as a late substitute for Martín Ligüera in a 2–0 away loss against Peñarol.

After spending his first two seasons as a backup, Fernández started to appear regularly from the 2017 campaign onwards. He scored his first professional goal on 25 March of that year, netting the winner in a 2–1 home defeat of El Tanque Sisley.

On 4 March 2018, Fernández scored a brace in a 3–2 defeat to Defensor Sporting. On 29 July, he scored a hat-trick in a 5–0 away routing of Cerro, and finished the campaign with 11 goals, playing a key part as his side narrowly avoided relegation.

=== Tigres UANL ===
On 24 June 2019, Fernández joined Mexican club Tigres UANL on a free transfer. He was immediately loaned out to Club Universidad de Chile.

=== Toluca ===
On 12 December 2019, Fernández joined Deportivo Toluca on a season-long loan. Despite his stellar form, head coach Ricardo Ferretti relegated him to a supporting role upon rejoining Tigres UANL. On 19 December 2021, Fernández joined Toluca on permanent basis.

==== Loan to Fluminense ====
On 4 July 2023, Fernández joined Fluminense on a one-year loan. The loan was terminated early after the player failed to make an impact at the club.

=== Peñarol ===
On 17 January 2024, Fernández joined Peñarol on a one-year loan. He finished the season as the league's top scorer with 16 goals. On 5 January 2025, Peñarol reached an agreement to sign Fernández for a reported fee of US$7 million, a record for Uruguayan football.

== International career ==
As a youth international, Fernández has represented Uruguay at the 2015 South American U-17 Championship and the 2019 Pan American Games.

== Career statistics ==
=== Club ===
As of 26 November 2023

Club	Season	League			Cup		Continental		Other		Total	
Club	Season	Division	Apps	Goals	Apps	Goals	Apps	Goals	Apps	Goals	Apps	Goals
Fénix	2014–15	Uruguayan Primera División	1	0	—		—		—		1	0
Fénix	2015–16	Uruguayan Primera División	12	0	—		—		—		12	0
Fénix	2016	Uruguayan Primera División	8	0	—		1 (Note: Appearance in Copa Sudamericana.)	0	—		9	0
Fénix	2017	Uruguayan Primera División	20	2	—		—		—		20	2
Fénix	2018	Uruguayan Primera División	34	11	—		—		—		34	11
Fénix	2019	Uruguayan Primera División	15	12	—		—		—		15	12
Fénix	Total		90	25	0	0	1	0	0	0	91	25
Tigres UANL	2020–21	Liga MX	22	1	—		3 (Note: Appearances in CONCACAF Champions League.)	1	0	0	25	2
Tigres UANL	2021–22	Liga MX	13	0	—		—		1 (Note: Appearances in Leagues Cup.)	0	14	0
Tigres UANL	Total		25	1	0	0	3	1	1	0	39	2
Universidad de Chile (loan)	2019	Chilean Primera División	7	1	2	0	—		—		9	1
Toluca (loan)	2019–20	Liga MX	10	8	4	0	—		—		14	8
Toluca	2021–22	Liga MX	15	7	—		—		—		15	7
Toluca	2022–23	Liga MX	39	10	—		—		—		39	10
Toluca	Total		54	17	0	0	0	0	0	0	54	17
Fluminense (loan)	2023	Série A	17	1	0	0	1	0	—		18	1
Career total			203	53	6	0	5	1	1	0	214	63

== Honours ==
Tigres UANL

- CONCACAF Champions League: 2020
- FIFA Club World Cup runner-up: 2020

Fluminense

- Copa Libertadores: 2023

Peñarol

- Uruguayan Primera División: 2024
- Copa Uruguay: 2025

Individual

- Uruguayan Primera División player of the season: 2024
- Uruguayan Primera División young player of the season: 2018
- Uruguayan Primera División team of the season: 2018, 2024
- Uruguayan Primera División top scorer: 2024
- Liga MX player of the month: January 2020
