= Claudio Baeza =

Chilean footballer (born 1993)

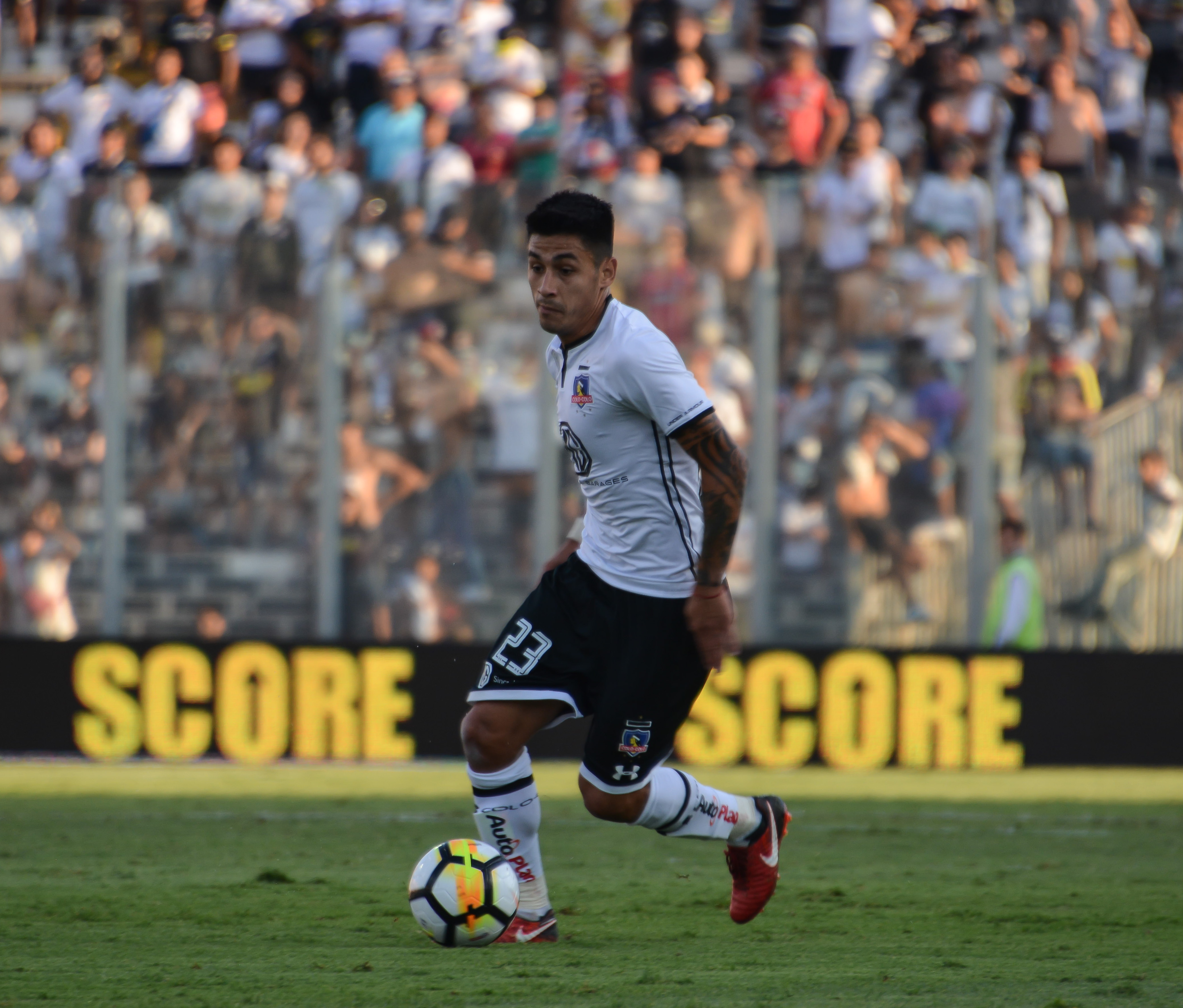
- Baeza with Colo Colo in 2018

Personal information
- Full name: Claudio Andrés Baeza Baeza
- Date of birth: 23 December 1993 (age 32)
- Place of birth: Los Angeles, Chile
- Height: 1.72 m (5 ft 8 in)
- Position: Midfielder

Team information
- Current team: Vélez Sarsfield
- Number: 5

Youth career
- Colo-Colo

Senior career*
Years	Team	Apps	(Gls)
2012–2018	Colo-Colo	214	(5)
2019	Al-Ahli	12	(0)
2019–2020	Necaxa	45	(2)
2021–2024	Toluca	141	(1)
2025–	Vélez Sarsfield	34	(0)

International career^{‡}
2013	Chile U20	8	(1)
2019–	Chile	18	(0)
- * Club domestic league appearances and goals as of 16:50, 16 June 2026 (UTC) ‡ National team caps and goals as of 23:22, 5 September 2024 (UTC)

Claudio Andrés Baeza Baeza (Note: In this Spanish name, the first or paternal surname is Baeza and the second or maternal family name is Baeza.) (born 23 December 1993) is a Chilean professional footballer who plays as a midfielder for Argentine Primera División club Vélez Sarsfield.

== Club career ==
In January 2025, Baeza signed with Argentine club Vélez Sarsfield.

== International career ==
He got his first call up to the senior Chile squad for a friendly against Paraguay in September 2015.

He made his debut on 5 September 2019 in a friendly against Argentina, as a starter.

== Career statistics ==
=== Club ===
As of 14 July 2025

Club statistics
Club	Division	League			Cup		Continental		Total	
Club	Division	Season	Apps	Goals	Apps	Goals	Apps	Goals	Apps	Goals
Colo-Colo B	Segunda División Profesional de Chile	2012	13	0	—		—		13	0
Colo-Colo B	Segunda División Profesional de Chile	2013	2	0	—		—		2	0
Colo-Colo B	Segunda División Profesional de Chile	2013–14	4	0	—		—		4	0
Colo-Colo B	Total		19	0	0	0	0	0	19	0
Colo-Colo	Chilean Primera División	2012	1	0	5	0	—		6	0
Colo-Colo	Chilean Primera División	2013	9	0	—		—		9	0
Colo-Colo	Chilean Primera División	2013–14	25	1	3	0	3	0	31	1
Colo-Colo	Chilean Primera División	2014–15	30	2	1	0	6	0	37	2
Colo-Colo	Chilean Primera División	2015–16	29	0	10	0	6	0	45	0
Colo-Colo	Chilean Primera División	2016–17	24	0	9	1	2	0	35	1
Colo-Colo	Chilean Primera División	2017	14	0	5	0	—		19	0
Colo-Colo	Chilean Primera División	2018	22	1	2	0	10	0	34	1
Colo-Colo	Total		154	4	35	1	27	0	216	5
Al-Ahli	Saudi Pro League	2018–19	12	0	—		—		12	0
Necaxa	Liga MX	2019–20	30	1	—		—		30	1
Necaxa	Liga MX	2020–21	15	1	—		—		15	1
Necaxa	Total		45	2	0	0	0	0	45	2
Toluca	Liga MX	2020–21	20	0	—		—		20	0
Toluca	Liga MX	2021–22	33	0	—		—		33	0
Toluca	Liga MX	2022–23	38	0	—		4	0	42	0
Toluca	Liga MX	2023–24	32	1	—		5	0	37	1
Toluca	Liga MX	2024–25	18	0	—		—		18	0
Toluca	Total		141	1	0	0	9	0	150	1
Vélez Sarsfield	Argentine Primera División	2025	7	0	1	0	6	0	14	0
Career total			378	7	36	1	42	0	456	8

=== International ===
As of 5 September 2024

Appearances and goals by national team and year
National team	Year	Apps	Goals
Chile	2019	4	0
Chile	2020	4	0
Chile	2021	7	0
Chile	2022	2	0
Chile	2024	1	0
Total		18	0

== Honours ==
Colo-Colo

- Chilean Primera División: 2014–C, 2015–A, 2017-T
- Copa Chile: 2016
- Supercopa de Chile: 2017, 2018

Vélez Sarsfield

- Supercopa Internacional: 2024
