= Marcel Ruiz (footballer) =

Mexican footballer (born 2000)

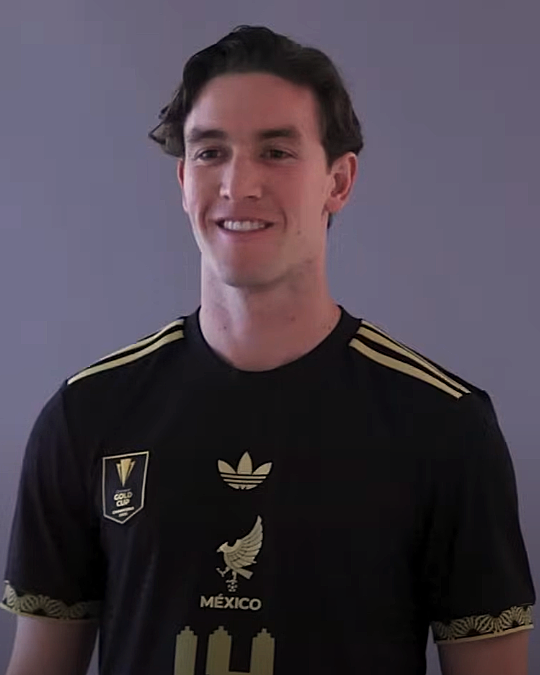
- Ruiz with Mexico in 2025

Personal information
- Full name: Marcel Alejandro Ruiz Suárez
- Date of birth: 26 October 2000 (age 26)
- Place of birth: Mérida, Yucatán, Mexico
- Height: 1.82 m (6 ft 0 in)
- Position: Midfielder

Team information
- Current team: Toluca
- Number: 14

Youth career
- 2012–2017: Querétaro

Senior career*
Years	Team	Apps	(Gls)
2018–2020	Querétaro	49	(6)
2020–2022	Tijuana	49	(2)
2022–	Toluca	116	(12)

International career^{‡}
2018	Mexico U20	2	(0)
2019–2021	Mexico U23	7	(0)
2023–	Mexico	17	(0)
Medal record
Men's football
Representing Mexico
CONCACAF Gold Cup
Winner	2025 United States–Canada
Toulon Tournament
Third place	2019 France	Team
Pan American Games
Bronze medal – third place	2019 Lima	Team
- * Club domestic league appearances and goals as of 7 April 2025 ‡ National team caps and goals as of 25 February 2026

Marcel Alejandro Ruiz Suárez (born 26 October 2000) is a Mexican professional footballer who plays as a midfielder for Liga MX club Toluca and the Mexico national team.

== Early life ==
Ruiz was born in Mérida, Yucatán, to a Mexican father and a Cuban mother. He moved with his family to Querétaro, Querétaro at the age of four. There, he began playing football at a young age and joined a local soccer school named River Plate, inspired by the Argentine club of the same name. His mother, a former gymnast, encouraged his early involvement in sports, enrolling him in karate and tennis before he began focusing more seriously on football. The academy would later become affiliated with Toluca Premier. With Toluca, Ruiz would compete in the Danone Nations Cup and the Liga Premier de México.

His early performances eventually led to his recruitment into the youth system of Querétaro.

== Club career ==
=== Querétaro ===
A product of the youth Querétaro team, Ruiz would make his senior debut in Liga MX on 21 July 2018 against Atlas, coming in at the 86th minute for Erbín Trejo, finishing the game in a 0–0 tie. On 22 August 2018, he would score his first goal for the team, winning the game against Club Universidad Nacional 1–0, becoming the youngest scorer of the season at the age of 17. On 31 August 2018, he contributed two assists for Camilo Sanvezzo to score the first two goals against Morelia, winning 4–1.

=== Tijuana ===
In July 2020, Ruiz signed with Club Tijuana after the club's owners, Grupo Caliente, sold Querétaro and transferred several of that team's players – including the 19-year-old Ruiz – to Tijuana. Ruiz made his debut for Tijuana in the Apertura 2020 and gradually became a regular squad member. Under new Tijuana coach Pablo Guede, Ruiz's role evolved from the attacking midfielder position he had played at Querétaro to a deeper playmaking role in central midfield. Often paired with fellow ex-Querétaro teammate Jordi Cortizo, he operated as a deep-lying midfielder with responsibilities in building up attacks and distributing the ball, while also contributing defensively. Guede's more progressive system relied on Ruiz's vision and press-resistant passing to link play between defense and attack.

Ruiz' impact with Tijuana was modest. Over two years with Xolos, he made 50 appearances in all competitions, scoring two goals and providing two assists. Notably, he scored his first goal for Tijuana on 25 February 2022, opening the scoring with a deflected shot in a 2–0 victory over reigning champions Atlas – a goal that also marked his first in Liga MX as a Xolos player. Despite some opportunities in the starting lineup, Ruiz's overall contributions remained limited, and he did not replicate the prolific form of his early Querétaro days. By the Clausura 2021, he was struggling to secure playing time, featuring only 46 minutes in the first three matches, and he acknowledged the need to improve to earn a spot in the starting XI under coach Guede.

=== Toluca ===
In June 2022, Ruiz joined Toluca in an exchange that saw Alexis Canelo join Tijuana. Coach Ignacio Ambríz had specifically requested Ruiz as part of an ambitious squad rebuild for the Apertura 2022, seeing the young midfielder as a key reinforcement. The transfer was viewed as a fresh start for Ruiz after a challenging spell in Tijuana, and it indeed preceded a resurgence in his form with Toluca in subsequent seasons.He became a central figure in Toluca's midfield and later played an important role in one of the club's most successful periods.

Ruiz helped Toluca win the Clausura 2025 championship after defeating América in the finals with an aggregate score of 2–0, their first title in 15 years. Toluca followed that title by winning the 2025 Campeón de Campeones against América and the 2025 Campeones Cup against LA Galaxy. During the Apertura 2025 season, Ruíz was designated as Toluca's vice-captain, regularly assuming the armband in matches when Alexis Vega was not on the field. He helped Toluca win a second consecutive league title in the Apertura 2025, defeating Tigres UANL on penalties in the final.

On 13 March 2026, Toluca announced that Ruiz had sustained an anterior cruciate ligament injury and a medial meniscus injury in his right knee during the first leg of the 2026 CONCACAF Champions Cup round of 16 against San Diego FC, and that he was expected to undergo surgery. After further medical evaluations and consultations with specialists, later reports described the injury as a partial ACL tear, with Ruiz and Toluca opting for conservative treatment in an attempt to keep alive his hopes of making Mexico's squad for the 2026 FIFA World Cup. He returned to action on 15 April, coming off the bench in Toluca's 3–0 win over LA Galaxy in the second leg of the quarter-finals. He continued playing for Toluca during the club's CONCACAF Champions Cup run, but after Toluca defeated Tigres in the final on 30 May, manager Antonio Mohamed stated that Ruiz had played through discomfort, had received an injection at half-time, and would need to undergo surgery.

== International career ==
=== Youth ===
Ruiz was called up by Diego Ramírez to the under-20 team to participate in a training camp ahead of the 2018 CONCACAF U-20 Championship and matches against Brazil and Japan. However, he did not make the final tournament squad, and ultimately earned only two caps at the under-20 level.

Ruiz was called up by Jaime Lozano to participate with the under-22 team at the 2019 Toulon Tournament, where Mexico finished in third. He was called up by Lozano again to participate at the 2019 Pan American Games, with Mexico winning the third-place match.

=== Senior ===
In March 2023, Ruiz was called up by manager Diego Cocca for the 2022–23 CONCACAF Nations League, and made his senior national team debut on 23 March 2023, in a 2–0 victory against Suriname.

Prior to that first senior call‑up, a rumor circulated widely in Guatemalan sports outlets during March 2022 suggesting that Ruiz possessed Guatemalan ancestry and was being evaluated by coach Luis Fernando Tena for a potential switch of allegiance. The National Football Federation of Guatemala issued a brief clarification that no eligibility process had been initiated, and Ruiz himself denied the story in multiple interviews, noting that his family background is Mexican with Cuban roots.

By March 2026, Ruiz had established himself as a regular under coach Javier Aguirre and had started all three of Mexico's matches in 2026 before suffering a knee injury, which came amid a wider injury crisis that also included Luis Ángel Malagón. Although Ruiz pursued a non-surgical recovery path and returned to club action in hopes of making the World Cup, he was omitted from Aguirre's initial Liga MX-based squad for Mexico's World Cup training camp, announced on 28 April 2026.

== Style of play ==
Ruíz has cited Andrés Iniesta and the Barcelona side of Pep Guardiola as formative influences, describing their tiki-taka era of 2008–2012, particularly the 2010–11 team, as "the best team in history." This admiration for Barcelona's possession-based style has shaped his own preference for composure, short passing, and spatial awareness in midfield.

Ruíz primarily plays as a central or defensive midfielder.[33] He contributes defensively and distributes the ball from midfield.[34] His passing accuracy has been reported at over 85 per cent, averaging approximately 50 passes per match.[36] He can also play in more advanced positions.[39]

== Career statistics ==
=== Club ===
As of match played 13 May 2024

Appearances and goals by club, season and competition
Club	Season	League			National cup		Continental		Other		Total	
Club	Season	Division	Apps	Goals	Apps	Goals	Apps	Goals	Apps	Goals	Apps	Goals
Querétaro	2018–19	Liga MX	28	2	7	0	—		—		35	2
Querétaro	2019–20	Liga MX	21	4	4	0	—		—		25	4
Querétaro	Total		49	6	11	0	—		—		60	6
Tijuana	2019–20	Liga MX	—		1	0	—		—		1	0
Tijuana	2020–21	Liga MX	23	0	—		—		—		23	0
Tijuana	2021–22	Liga MX	26	2	—		—		—		26	2
Tijuana	Total		49	2	1	0	—		—		50	2
Toluca	2022–23	Liga MX	40	5	—		—		—		40	5
Toluca	2023–24	Liga MX	33	2	—		2 (Note: Appearances in CONCACAF Champions Cup)	0	4 (Note: Appearances in Leagues Cup)	2	39	4
Toluca	2024–25	Liga MX	0	0	—		—		—		0	0
Toluca	Total		73	7	—		2	0	4	2	79	9
Career total			171	15	12	0	2	0	4	2	189	17

=== International ===
As of match played 25 February 2026

Appearances and goals by national team and year
National team	Year	Apps	Goals
Mexico	2023	1	0
Mexico	2024	0	0
Mexico	2025	13	0
Mexico	2026	3	0
Total		17	0

== Honours ==
Toluca

- Liga MX: Clausura 2025, Apertura 2025
- Campeón de Campeones: 2025
- Campeones Cup: 2025
- CONCACAF Champions Cup: 2026
- Leagues Cup: 2026

Mexico U23

- Pan American Bronze Medal: 2019

Mexico

- CONCACAF Gold Cup: 2025

Individual

- Liga MX Best XI: Clausura 2025
- Liga MX All-Star: 2025
- Liga MX Best Defensive Midfielder: 2025–26
