= Raúl López (footballer, born 1993) =

Mexican footballer (born 1993)

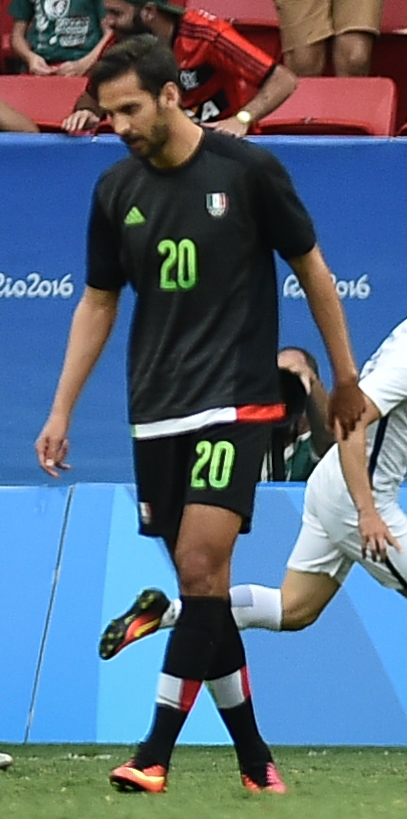
- López with Mexico at the 2016 Summer Olympics

Personal information
- Full name: Raúl López Gómez
- Date of birth: 23 February 1993 (age 33)
- Place of birth: Zapopan, Jalisco, Mexico
- Height: 1.83 m (6 ft 0 in)
- Position: Right-back

Team information
- Current team: Inter Toronto
- Number: 6

Youth career
- 2008–2013: Guadalajara

Senior career*
Years	Team	Apps	(Gls)
2013–2017	Guadalajara	51	(3)
2014	→ UAT (loan)	15	(1)
2014	→ Coras (loan)	13	(1)
2016	→ Pachuca (loan)	13	(0)
2017–2021	Pachuca	79	(2)
2020–2021	→ Toluca (loan)	36	(1)
2021–2022	Toluca	44	(3)
2023–2024	Santos Laguna	41	(1)
2025	Jaiba Brava	13	(1)
2025–2026	FC Rànger's	9	(0)
2026–	Inter Toronto	19	(1)

International career
2013	Mexico U20	4	(1)
2015–2016	Mexico U23	12	(3)
2015–2017	Mexico	7	(0)
Medal record
Representing Mexico
Men's football
Olympic Qualifying Championship
Winner	2015 United States
- * Club domestic league appearances and goals as of 31 October 2026

Raúl López Gómez (born 23 February 1993), also known as El Dedos, is a Mexican professional footballer who plays as a right-back.

== Club career ==
=== Youth ===
López joined Guadalajara's youth academy in 2008. He continued through Chivas Youth Academy successfully going through U-17 and U-20. Until finally reaching the first team, Benjamín Galindo was the coach promoting lópez to first team.

=== Guadalajara ===
López made his professional debut for Guadalajara under coach Benjamín Galindo on 3 March 2013 in a 1–1 draw against UNAM.

==== Correcaminos UAT (loan) ====
On 21 December 2013, he went out on loan to second division team Correcaminos UAT, for six months in order to gain experience and playing time.

==== Coras de Tepic (loan) ====
The following season, López was again sent out on loan for six months, this time to Coras de Tepic. He had a great season and helped lead the squad to the 2014 Ascenso MX Apertura final; the squad ended up losing.

==== Guadalajara (return) ====
After a great season with Coras and the Mexico national under-20 football team, López returned to Chivas and became a regular starter. On 1 March 2015 he scored his first career goal with Guadalajara in a 3–0 win against Monterrey. On 4 November 2015, Chivas beat León 1–0 in the Copa MX final.

=== Pachuca ===
On June 8, 2016, Lopez joined Pachuca on loan. During his loan spell, Pachuca beat Tigres 2–1 on aggregate to win the 2016-17 CONCACAF Champions League. He scored the first goal of the final, away at the Estadio Universitario, in a match that ended 1–1. On June 8, 2017, he was permanently signed for an undisclosed amount.

=== Toluca ===
On 8 June 2020, Lopez joined Toluca for the 2020 Apertura.

=== Santos Laguna ===
On 12 December 2022, Lopez signed for Santos Laguna.

== International career ==
=== Youth ===
He was selected for the 2013 FIFA U-20 World Cup. On 18 September 2015, López was selected by coach Raul Gutierrez to play in the 2015 CONCACAF Men's Olympic Qualifying Championship.

=== Senior ===
On 8 November 2015, López was called up to the senior national team to replace Paul Aguilar, who was injured.

== Career statistics ==
=== Club ===
As of 30 January 2024

Appearances and goals by club, season and competition
Club	Season	League			Cup		Continental		Other		Total	
Club	Season	Division	Apps	Goals	Apps	Goals	Apps	Goals	Apps	Goals	Apps	Goals
Guadalajara	2012–13	Liga MX	4	0	0	0	—		—		4	0
Guadalajara	2013–14	Liga MX	0	0	1	0	—		—		1	0
Guadalajara	2014–15	Liga MX	21	1	0	0	—		—		21	1
Guadalajara	2015–16	Liga MX	26	2	0	0	—		—		26	2
Guadalajara	Total		51	3	1	0	0	0	0	0	52	3
Correcaminos UAT (loan)	2013–14	Ascenso MX	15	1	5	0	—		—		20	1
Coras de Tepic (loan)	2014–15	Ascenso MX	13	1	3	0	—		—		16	1
Pachuca (loan)	2016–17	Liga MX	27	0	0	0	10 (Note: Appearances in CONCACAF Champions League)	1	1 (Note: Appearances in Campeón de Campeones)	0	28	1
Pachuca	2017–18	Liga MX	19	0	6	0	—		2 (Note: Appearances in FIFA Club World Cup)	0	27	0
Pachuca	2018–19	Liga MX	21	1	8	0	—		—		29	1
Pachuca	2019–20	Liga MX	20	1	4	0	—		—		24	1
Pachuca	Total		87	2	18	0	10	1	3	0	118	3
Toluca (loan)	2020–21	Liga MX	36	1	—		—		—		36	1
Toluca	2021–22	Liga MX	31	2	—		—		—		31	2
Toluca	2022–23	Liga MX	13	1	—		—		—		13	1
Toluca	Total		80	4	0	0	0	0	0	0	80	4
Santos Laguna	2022–23	Liga MX	16	1	—		—		—		16	1
Santos Laguna	2023–24	Liga MX	17	0	—		2 (Note: Appearances in Leagues Cup)	1	—		19	1
Santos Laguna	Total		33	1	0	0	2	1	0	0	35	2
Career total												

=== International ===
National team	Year	Apps	Goals
Mexico	2015	1	0
Mexico	2017	6	0
Total		7	0

== Honours ==
Guadalajara

- Copa MX: Apertura 2015

Pachuca

- CONCACAF Champions League: 2016–17

Mexico Youth

- Central American and Caribbean Games: 2014
- CONCACAF Olympic Qualifying Championship: 2015
