= Roberto de la Rosa =

Mexican footballer (born 2000)

Personal information
- Full name: Roberto Carlos de la Rosa González
- Date of birth: 4 January 2000 (age 26)
- Place of birth: Texcoco, Mexico
- Height: 1.75 m (5 ft 9 in)
- Position: Forward

Team information
- Current team: Monterrey
- Number: 27

Youth career
- 2013–2017: Pachuca

Senior career*
Years	Team	Apps	(Gls)
2017–2025	Pachuca	139	(19)
2024–2025	→ Monterrey (loan)	34	(2)
2025–	Monterrey	29	(4)

International career^{‡}
2017	Mexico U17	17	(15)
2018–2019	Mexico U20	6	(3)
2023	Mexico	3	(1)
Medal record
Men's football
Representing Mexico
CONCACAF U-17 Championship
Winner	2017 Panama	Team
- * Club domestic league appearances and goals as of 14 November 2026 ‡ National team caps and goals as of 10 June 2023

Roberto Carlos de la Rosa González (born 4 January 2000) is a Mexican professional footballer who plays as a forward for Liga MX club Monterrey.

== Club career ==
=== Pachuca ===
Born in Texcoco, State of Mexico, de la Rosa began playing football in Pachuca's youth system. Manager Diego Alonso eventually brought him into the senior club and made his professional debut on 12 August 2017, in a Liga MX match against Tigres UANL, coming on as a substitute in a 2–1 victory. On 16 December 2017, he scored in the 2017 FIFA Club World Cup third place match against hosts Al-Jazira in a 4–1 win, making him the youngest player to ever score in a FIFA Club World Cup. On 26 February 2019, de la Rosa scored his first professional goal in a Copa MX round of 16 match against América in a 5–2 defeat. On 23 November 2019, he scored his first league goals, a brace against Pumas UNAM in a 2–0 victory.

==== Loan to Monterrey ====
On 11 June 2024, de la Rosa joined Monterrey on a one-year loan.

== International career ==
=== Youth ===
In April 2019, de la Rosa was included in the 21-player squad to represent Mexico at the U-20 World Cup in Poland.

=== Senior ===
In mid April 2023, de la Rosa was called up to the senior national team by manager Diego Cocca for a friendly match against the United States. He made his senior debut for Mexico on 19 April 2023, in a friendly against the United States playing 86 minutes before being subbed off by Ozziel Herrera.

On 7 June 2023, in de la Rosa's second appearance for the senior national team, he scored his first goal in a 2–0 victory against Guatemala.

== Career statistics ==
=== Club ===
As of match played on 14 November 2026

Appearances and goals by club, season and competition
Club	Season	League			Cup		Continental		Global		Other		Total	
Club	Season	Division	Apps	Goals	Apps	Goals	Apps	Goals	Apps	Goals	Apps	Goals	Apps	Goals
Pachuca	2017–18	Liga MX	7	0	6	0	—		1 (Note: Appearances in FIFA Club World Cup)	1	—		14	1
Pachuca	2018–19	Liga MX	—		3	1	—		—		—		3	1
Pachuca	2019–20	Liga MX	13	2	7	1	—		—		—		20	3
Pachuca	2020–21	Liga MX	35	8	—		—		—		—		35	8
Pachuca	2021–22	Liga MX	29	4	—		—		—		—		29	4
Pachuca	2022–23	Liga MX	31	4	1 (Note: Appearance in Campeón de Campeones)	0	2 (Note: Appearances in CONCACAF Champions Cup)	0	—		—		34	4
Pachuca	2023–24	Liga MX	24	1	—		2	0	—		1 (Note: Appearances in Leagues Cup)	0	27	1
Pachuca	Total		139	19	17	2	4	0	1	1	1	0	162	22
Monterrey (loan)	2024–25	Liga MX	34	2	—		4	1	—		1	0	39	3
Monterrey	2025–26	Liga MX	22	2	—		3	2	3	0	—		28	4
Monterrey	2026–27	Liga MX	7	2	—		—		—		3	0	10	2
Monterrey	Total		29	4	—		3	2	3	0	3	0	38	6
Career total			202	25	17	2	11	3	4	1	5	0	239	31

=== International ===
As of match played on 7 June 2023

Appearances and goals by national team and year
National team	Year	Apps	Goals
Mexico	2023	3	1
Total		3	1

Scores and results list Mexico's goal tally first.

List of international goals scored by Roberto de la Rosa
No.	Date	Venue	Opponent	Score	Result	Competition
1.	7 June 2023	Estadio de Mazatlán, Mazatlán, Mexico	Guatemala	2–0	2–0	Friendly

== Honours ==
Pachuca

- Liga MX: Apertura 2022
- CONCACAF Champions Cup: 2024

Mexico U17

- CONCACAF U-17 Championship: 2017
