= Gustavo Gutiérrez (footballer) =

Mexican footballer (born 1996)

Personal information
- Full name: Gustavo Guadalupe Gutiérrez Muñoz
- Date of birth: 1 November 1996 (age 29)
- Place of birth: Tepatitlán, Jalisco, Mexico
- Height: 1.81 m (5 ft 11 in)
- Position: Goalkeeper

Team information
- Current team: Marquense

Youth career
- 2017–2019: Toluca

Senior career*
Years	Team	Apps	(Gls)
2019–2023	Toluca	13	(0)
2019–2020	→ Tepatitlán (loan)	20	(0)
2024–2025	Cancún	44	(0)
2025–2026	Tepatitlán	39	(0)
2026–	Marquense	0	(0)
- * Club domestic league appearances and goals as of 25 June 2026

Gustavo Guadalupe Gutiérrez Muñoz (born 1 November 1996) is a Mexican professional footballer who plays as a goalkeeper for Liga Bantrab club Marquense.

== Career statistics ==
=== Club ===
As of 25 June 2026

Club	Season	League			Cup		Continental		Other		Total		
Club	Season	Division	Apps	Goals	Apps	Goals	Apps	Goals	Apps	Goals	Apps	Goals	
Toluca	2019–20	Liga MX	—		1 (Note: Appearances in 2020 Copa por México)	0	—		—		1	0	
Toluca	2021–22	Liga MX	11	0	—		—		—		11	0	
Toluca	2022–23	Liga MX	2	0	2 (Note: Appearances in 2022 Copa por México)	0	—		—		4	0	
Toluca	Total		13	0	3	0	—		—		16	0	
Tepatitlán (loan)	2019–20	Serie A de México	20	0	—		—		—		20	0	
Cancún	2023–24	Liga de Expansión MX	18	0	—		—		—		18	0	
Cancún	2024–25	Liga de Expansión MX	26	0	—		—		—		26	0	
Cancún	Total		44	0	—		—		—		44	0	
Cancún	Tepatitlán	2025–26	Liga de Expansión MX	39	0	—		—		—		39	0
Career total			13	0	3	0	0	0	0	0	13	0	
