= Óscar Murillo =

Colombian footballer (born 1988)

Personal information
- Full name: Óscar Fabián Murillo Murillo
- Date of birth: 18 April 1988 (age 38)
- Place of birth: Armenia, Colombia
- Height: 1.84 m (6 ft 0 in)
- Position: Centre-back

Youth career
- 2005–2006: Boca Juniors

Senior career*
Years	Team	Apps	(Gls)
2007–2008	Centauros Villavicencio	0	(0)
2008–2011	Deportes Quindío	58	(2)
2010	→ Colorado Rapids (loan)	0	(0)
2011–2012	Deportivo Pereira	16	(0)
2012–2015	Atlético Nacional	115	(9)
2016–2023	Pachuca	219	(8)

International career
2016–2022	Colombia	23	(0)
Medal record
Representing Colombia
Men's football
Copa América
Third place	2021 Brazil
- * Club domestic league appearances and goals

Óscar Fabián Murillo Murillo (born 18 April 1988) is a Colombian former professional footballer who played as a centre-back.

== Club career ==
Murillo began his career in the youth system of famed Argentinian side Boca Juniors. In 2007, he returned to Colombia to play for second division side Centauros Villavicencio. In 2008, he joined his hometown side Deportes Quindío and became a regular starter. His play with Quindío led to interest from foreign sides, particularly from Major League Soccer. He was signed on loan by Colorado Rapids in February 2010. His loan was terminated in July 2010 without Murillo making a single league appearance. On 20 February 2012, he played for Atlético Nacional and scored twice in their win against Millonarios FC.

=== Pachuca ===
On 10 December 2015, Pachuca announced that Murillo would be joining the team for the Clausura 2016.

== International career ==
In May 2018 he was named in Colombia's preliminary 35 man squad for the 2018 World Cup in Russia.

== Career statistics ==
=== International ===
As of match played 9 September 2021

Colombia
Year	Apps	Goals
2016	7	0
2017	4	0
2018	4	0
2019	2	0
2021	6	0
Total	23	0

== Honours ==
Atlético Nacional

- Categoría Primera A (3): 2013-I, 2013-II, 2014-I
- Copa Colombia (2): 2012, 2013
- Superliga Colombiana (1): 2012

Pachuca

- Liga MX (2): Clausura 2016, Apertura 2022
- CONCACAF Champions League (1): 2016–17

Colombia

- Copa América third place: 2021
