= Alan Rodríguez (footballer, born 1996) =

Mexican footballer (born 1996)

Personal information
- Full name: Alan Omar Rodríguez Ortiz
- Date of birth: 20 March 1996 (age 30)
- Place of birth: Chapala, Jalisco, Mexico
- Height: 1.80 m (5 ft 11 in)
- Position: Midfielder

Team information
- Current team: Irapuato
- Number: 24

Youth career
- 2016–2020: Toluca
- 2020: Tlaxcala

Senior career*
Years	Team	Apps	(Gls)
2019–2023	Toluca	33	(0)
2019	→ UdeC (loan)	8	(1)
2023	Tlaxcala	13	(0)
2024	Celaya	12	(0)
2024–2025	Cancún	14	(0)
2025–	Irapuato	0	(0)
- * Club domestic league appearances and goals as of 24 July 2025

Alan Omar Rodríguez Ortiz (born 20 March 1996) is a Mexican professional footballer who plays as a midfielder for Liga de Expansión MX club Irapuato.

== Career statistics ==
=== Club ===
As of 16 April 2023

Club	Season	League			Cup		Continental		Other		Total	
Club	Season	Division	Apps	Goals	Apps	Goals	Apps	Goals	Apps	Goals	Apps	Goals
Toluca	2020–21	Liga MX	2	0	—		—		—		2	0
Toluca	2021–22	Liga MX	14	0	—		—		—		14	0
Toluca	2022–23	Liga MX	17	0	—		—		—		17	0
Toluca	Total		33	0	—		—		—		33	0
UdeC (loan)	2019–20	Ascenso MX	8	1	—		—		—		8	1
Career total			41	1	0	0	0	0	0	0	41	1
