= Paulino de la Fuente =

Spanish footballer

Paulino
Personal information
- Full name: Paulino de la Fuente Gómez
- Date of birth: 27 June 1997 (age 29)
- Place of birth: Santander, Spain
- Height: 1.81 m (5 ft 11 in)
- Position: Winger

Youth career
- 2003–2006: Pandas
- 2006–2007: Bansander
- 2007–2011: Racing Santander
- 2011–2013: Bansander
- 2013–2016: Inter Milan
- 2016: Atlético Madrid

Senior career*
Years	Team	Apps	(Gls)
2016–2020	Alavés B	104	(24)
2020	Alavés	3	(0)
2020–2021	Logroñés	31	(1)
2021–2022	Málaga	37	(4)
2022–2024	Pachuca	20	(2)
2023–2024	→ Oviedo (loan)	34	(9)
2024–2025	Oviedo	25	(1)
2025–2026	Zaragoza	8	(0)
- * Club domestic league appearances and goals as of 29 November 2025

Paulino de la Fuente Gómez (born 27 June 1997), simply known as Paulino, is a Spanish professional footballer who plays as a winger.

== Club career ==
Paulino was born in Santander, Cantabria, and began his career with AD Pandas at the age of six. In 2013, after representing Club Bansander (two stints) and Racing de Santander, he moved abroad and joined Inter Milan's youth setup.

On 1 February 2016, Paulino returned to Spain and agreed to a two-and-a-half-year contract with Atlético Madrid, being assigned to their Juvenil A squad. In July, he signed for Deportivo Alavés, being initially assigned to the reserves in Tercera División.

Paulino made his senior debut on 28 August 2016, playing the last 29 minutes in a 4–0 home routing of Santutxu FC. He scored his first goal on 8 December, netting the game's only in an away defeat of Pasaia KE.

A regular starter for the B's, Paulino renewed his contract until 2021 on 28 September 2018. He contributed with five goals in 24 appearances (play-offs included) during that season, as the club achieved promotion to Segunda División B.

Paulino made his first team – and La Liga – debut on 21 June 2020, coming on as a half-time substitute for Lucas Pérez in a 0–6 away loss against RC Celta de Vigo. On 23 September, he signed a one-year contract with Segunda División newcomers UD Logroñés.

On 1 July 2021, after Logroñés' relegation, Paulino signed a two-year deal with Málaga CF also in the second division. On 20 June of the following year, he left after paying his release clause, and moved to Liga MX side Pachuca just hours later.

On 25 July 2023, Paulino returned to his home country and its second level, after agreeing to a one-year loan deal with Real Oviedo. On 19 July of the following year, he signed a permanent two-year contract with the club.

Paulino scored once in 27 appearances for Oviedo during the 2024–25 season as the club achieved promotion to La Liga, but was released on 29 July 2025. On 2 August, he agreed to a two-year deal with Real Zaragoza back in the second division.

== Honours ==
Pachuca

- Liga MX: Apertura 2022
