= Romario Ibarra =

Ecuadorian footballer (born 1994)

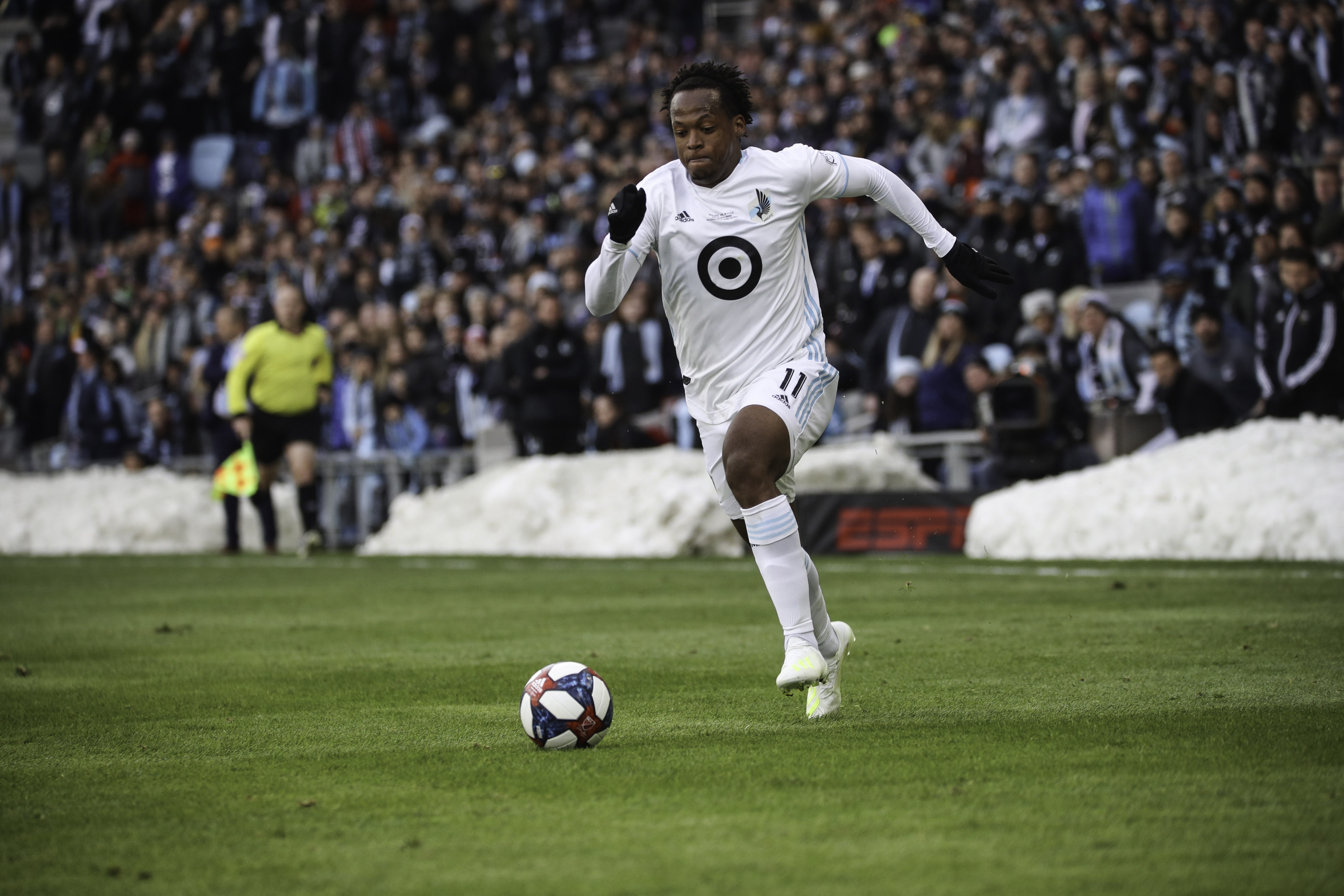
- Ibarra with Minnesota United in 2019

Personal information
- Full name: Romario Andrés Ibarra Mina
- Date of birth: 24 September 1994 (age 32)
- Place of birth: Atuntaqui, Ecuador
- Height: 1.75 m (5 ft 9 in)
- Position: Winger

Team information
- Current team: Vinotinto F.C. Ecuador
- Number: 77

Youth career
- 2006–2010: Valle del Chota
- 2010–2011: ESPOLI
- 2011–2012: Universidad Católica

Senior career*
Years	Team	Apps	(Gls)
2012–2018	Universidad Católica	134	(14)
2013	→ LDU Quito (loan)	7	(0)
2018–2020	Minnesota United	17	(5)
2019–2020	→ Pachuca (loan)	20	(4)
2020–2023	Pachuca	78	(11)
2023	→ Oviedo (loan)	7	(0)
2024–2025	Independiente del Valle	21	(1)
2025–	Vinotinto F.C. Ecuador	8	(1)

International career^{‡}
2017–	Ecuador	27	(3)
- * Club domestic league appearances and goals as of 15:13, 13 February 2025 (UTC) ‡ National team caps and goals as of 12:33, 26 November 2022 (UTC)

Romario Andrés Ibarra Mina (born 24 September 1994) is an Ecuadorian professional footballer who plays for Ecuadorian Serie A club Vinotinto F.C. Ecuador and the Ecuador national team. He is the younger brother of Renato Ibarra.

== Career ==
Ibarra was announced at Minnesota United on 9 July 2018. He scored his first goal for the club against LA Galaxy on 12 August 2018, scoring in the 84th minute.

On 21 May 2019, Ibarra moved to Pachuca on a 13-month loan, with an option to buy at the end of the loan.

On 1 July 2020, Ibarra transferred permanently to Pachuca.

On 16 June 2023, Ibarra was announced on loan at Real Oviedo until the end of the season. Ibarra left the club on 12 December 2023.

== International career ==
On 5 October 2017, Ibarra made his debut for the senior national team in a World Cup qualifying match against Chile.

Ibarra was selected in the 23-man Ecuador squad for the 2019 Copa América.

Ibarra was named in the Ecuadorian squad for the 2022 FIFA World Cup.

== Personal life ==
Romario's brother, Renato Ibarra, is also a professional footballer and represented Ecuador at senior level as well.

== Career statistics ==
=== International ===
As of 12 September 2023

Ecuador
Year	Apps	Goals
2017	2	2
2018	3	1
2019	11	0
2020	2	0
2022	9	0
Total	27	3

List of international goals scored by Romario Ibarra
No.	Date	Venue	Opponent	Score	Result	Competition
1	5 October 2017	Estadio Monumental David Arellano, Santiago, Chile	Chile	1–1	1–2	2018 FIFA World Cup qualification
2	10 October 2017	Estadio Olímpico Atahualpa, Quito, Ecuador	Argentina	1–0	1–3	2018 FIFA World Cup qualification
3	11 September 2018	Toyota Park, Bridgeview, United States	Guatemala	2–0	2–0	Friendly

== Honours ==
Universidad Católica

- Ecuadorian Serie B: 2012

Pachuca

- Liga MX: Apertura 2022
