= Apertura 2025 Liga MX final phase =

Tournament details
- Dates: 20 November – 14 December 2025
- Teams: 10

Tournament statistics
- Matches played: 17
- Goals scored: 46 (2.71 per match)

The Apertura 2025 Liga MX final phase was played between 20 November and 14 December 2025. A total of ten teams competed in the final phase to decide the champions of the Apertura 2025 Liga MX season.

For the fifth straight season, the number of clubs qualifying for the quarter-finals was six, while the number of teams qualifying for the reclassification was four. The four clubs that qualified for the reclassification competed in the "play-in" round, a tournament modeled after the NBA play-in tournament.

Toluca won their second straight title after defeating Tigres UANL on penalties. As winners, Toluca will face the Clausura 2026 champion, Cruz Azul, in the 2026 Campeón de Campeones.

== Qualified teams ==
The following teams qualified for the championship stage.

In the following tables, the number of appearances, last appearance, and previous best result count only those in the short tournament era starting from Invierno 1996 (not counting those in the long tournament era from 1943–44 to 1995–96).

Qualified directly to quarter-finals (6 teams)
Seed	Team	Points (GD)	Date of qualification	Appearance	Last appearance	Previous best (last)	Ref.
1	Toluca	37	18 October 2025 (PLAY); 22 October 2025 (QF)	40th	Clausura 2025	Champions (Cl. 2025)	
2	Tigres UANL	36	18 October 2025 (PLAY); 25 October 2025 (QF)	36th	Clausura 2025	Champions (Cl. 2023)	
3	Cruz Azul	35	18 October 2025 (PLAY); 25 October 2025 (QF)	38th	Clausura 2025	Champions (Gua. 2021)	
4	América	34	18 October 2025 (PLAY); 24 October 2025 (QF)	41st	Clausura 2025	Champions (Ap. 2024)	
5	Monterrey	31	18 October 2025 (PLAY); 25 October 2025 (QF)	32nd	Clausura 2025	Champions (Ap. 2019)	
6	Guadalajara	29	26 October 2025 (PLAY); 7 November 2025 (QF)	34th	Apertura 2024	Champions (Cl. 2017)	

Qualified to play-in round (4 teams)
Seed	Team	Points (GD)	Date of qualification	Appearance	Last appearance	Previous best (last)	Ref.
7	Tijuana	24	31 October 2025	9th	Apertura 2024	Champions (Ap. 2012)	
8	Juárez	23	31 October 2025	3rd	Clausura 2025	Reclassification (Cl. 2025)	
9	Pachuca	22	31 October 2025	42nd	Clausura 2025	Champions (Ap. 2022)	
10	UNAM	21	8 November 2025	29th	Clausura 2025	Champions (Cl. 2011)	

== Play-in round ==
=== Format ===
The 9th place team hosted the 10th place team in an elimination game. The 7th hosted the 8th place team in the double-chance game, with the winner advancing as the 7-seed. The loser of this game then hosted the winner of the elimination game between the 9th and 10th place teams to determine the 8-seed.

=== Bracket ===
Play-in games
Serie A
7	Tijuana	3
8	Juárez	1
Serie B
9	Pachuca	3
10	Pumas UNAM	1

No. 8 seed game
8	Juárez	2
9	Pachuca	1

Final seeds
7	Tijuana	No. 7 seed
8	Juárez	No. 8 seed

=== Play-in matches ===
Team 1	Score	Team 2
Tijuana	3–1	Juárez
Pachuca	3–1	Pumas UNAM

==== Serie A ====
20 November 2025
19:00 PST (UTC−8)

Tijuana	3–1	Juárez
Mourad 31'; Mora 59' (pen.); Bullaude 90+1'	Report	Estupiñán 12'

Estadio Caliente, Tijuana
Attendance: 13,800
Referee: Marco Antonio Ortiz (Durango)

==== Serie B ====
20 November 2025
19:00 CST (UTC−6)

Pachuca	3–1	Pumas UNAM
Valencia 33'; Kenedy 40', 55'	Report	Vite 65'

Estadio Hidalgo, Pachuca
Attendance: 25,920
Referee: Luis Enrique Santander (Guanajuato)

==== 8th seed match ====
Team 1	Score	Team 2
Juárez	2–1	Pachuca

23 November 2025
18:00 MST (UTC−7)

Juárez	2–1	Pachuca
Madson 15'; Rodríguez 38'	Report	Cádiz 45+1'

Estadio Olímpico Benito Juárez, Ciudad Juárez
Attendance: 12,500
Referee: Oscar Mejía García (Mexico City)

== Bracket ==
Quarter-finals
1	Toluca	2	0	2
8	Juárez	1	0	1
4	América	0	2	2
5	Monterrey	2	1	3
2	Tigres UANL	0	5	5
7	Tijuana	3	0	3
3	Cruz Azul	0	3	3
6	Guadalajara	0	2	2

Semi-finals
1	Toluca (s)	0	3	3
5	Monterrey	1	2	3
2	Tigres UANL (s)	1	1	2
3	Cruz Azul	1	1	2

Finals
1	Toluca (p)	0	2	2 (9)
2	Tigres UANL	1	1	2 (8)

== Quarter-finals ==
=== Summary ===
The first legs were played on 26 and 27 November, and the second legs were played on 29 and 30 November 2025.

Team 1	Agg.	Team 2	1st leg	2nd leg
Juárez	1–2	Toluca	1–2	0–0
Tijuana	3–5	Tigres UANL	3–0	0–5
Guadalajara	2–3	Cruz Azul	0–0	2–3
Monterrey	3–2	América	2–0	1–2

=== Matches ===
26 November 2025
18:00 MDT (UTC−7)

Juárez	1–2	Toluca
Murillo 3'	Report	Briseño 56'; Paulinho 65'

Estadio Olímpico Benito Juárez, Ciudad Juárez
Attendance: 14,500
Referee: Maximiliano Quintero Hernández (Veracruz)
29 November 2025
19:10 CST (UTC−6)

Toluca	0–0	Juárez
	Report

Estadio Nemesio Díez, Toluca
Attendance: 28,273
Referee: Katia Itzel García (Mexico City)

Toluca won 2–1 on aggregate.

26 November 2025
21:00 PST (UTC−8)

Tijuana	3–0	Tigres UANL
Castañeda 27'; Mourad 54'; Mora 71'	Report

Estadio Caliente, Tijuana
Attendance: 20,733
Referee: Vicente Jassiel Reynoso (Nayarit)
29 November 2025
21:10 CST (UTC−6)

Tigres UANL	5–0	Tijuana
Ibáñez 15'; Brunetta 30' (pen.), 39'; Herrera 74'; Vigón 90+3'	Report

Estadio Universitario, San Nicolás de los Garza
Attendance: 41,615
Referee: Marco Antonio Ortiz (Durango)

Tigres UANL won 5–3 on aggregate.

27 November 2025
20:07 CST (UTC−6)

Guadalajara	0–0	Cruz Azul
	Report

Estadio Akron, Zapopan
Attendance: 41,476
Referee: Guillermo Pacheco Larios (Sonora)
30 November 2025
19:00 CST (UTC−6)

Cruz Azul	3–2	Guadalajara
Fernández 14'; Márquez 72'; Rodríguez 90+7'	Report	Cowell 8'; B. González 35'

Estadio Olímpico Universitario, Mexico City
Attendance: 58,445
Referee: Daniel Quintero Huitrón (Jalisco)

Cruz Azul won 3–2 on aggregate.

26 November 2025
21:10 CST (UTC−6)

Monterrey	2–0	América
Canales 45+3'; Ambríz 70'	Report

Estadio BBVA, Guadalupe
Attendance: 43,688
Referee: Jesús Rafael López (Sinaloa)
29 November 2025
17:00 CST (UTC−6)

América	2–1	Monterrey
Zendejas 30'; Zúñiga 59'	Report	Berterame 90+3'

Estadio Ciudad de los Deportes, Mexico City
Attendance: 30,681
Referee: César Arturo Ramos (Sinaloa)

Monterrey won 3–2 on aggregate.

== Semi-finals ==
=== Summary ===
The first legs were played on 3 December, and the second legs were played on 6 December 2025.

Team 1	Agg.	Team 2	1st leg	2nd leg
Monterrey	3–3 (s)	Toluca	1–0	2–3
Cruz Azul	2–2 (s)	Tigres UANL	1–1	1–1

=== Matches ===
3 December 2025
21:10 CST (UTC−6)

Monterrey	1–0	Toluca
Berterame 39'	Report

Estadio BBVA, Guadalupe
Attendance: 50,716
Referee: Daniel Quintero Huitrón (Jalisco)
6 December 2025
19:00 CST (UTC−6)

Toluca	3–2	Monterrey
Pereira 19'; Paulinho 43'; Helinho 51' (pen.)	Report	Ramos 58' (pen.); De la Rosa 75'

Estadio Nemesio Díez, Toluca
Referee: Luis Enrique Santander (Guanajuato)

3–3 on aggregate. Toluca advanced due to being the higher seeded club.

3 December 2025
19:00 CST (UTC−6)

Cruz Azul	1–1	Tigres UANL
Fernández 76' (pen.)	Report	Correa 61'

Estadio Olímpico Universitario, Mexico City
Referee: Ismael Rosario López (Sinaloa)
6 December 2025
21:10 CST (UTC−6)

Tigres UANL	1–1	Cruz Azul
Brunetta 27'	Report	Purata 90+5' (o.g.)

Estadio Universitario, San Nicolás de los Garza
Referee: Víctor Alfonso Cáceres (Chiapas)

2–2 on aggregate. Tigres UANL advanced due to being the higher seeded club.

== Finals ==
=== Summary ===
The first leg was played on 11 December, and the second leg was played on 14 December 2025.

Team 1	Agg.	Team 2	1st leg	2nd leg
Tigres UANL	2–2 (8–9 p)	Toluca	1–0	1–2 (a.e.t.)

=== First leg ===
11 December 2025
20:00 CST (UTC−6)

Tigres UANL	1–0	Toluca
Correa 46'	Report

Estadio Universitario, San Nicolás de los Garza
Referee: Marco Antonio Ortiz (Durango)

==== Details ====
Tigres UANL	Toluca

GK	1	(Argentina) Nahuel Guzmán
DF	14	(Mexico) Jesús Garza	(yellow card) 63'
DF	2	(Brazil) Joaquim
DF	27	(Mexico) Jesús Angulo	(yellow card) 18'	(substituted off) 83'
DF	3	(United States) Marco Farfan		(substituted off) 85'
MF	23	(Brazil) Rômulo
MF	8	(Uruguay) Fernando Gorriarán (c)
MF	16	(Mexico) Diego Lainez
MF	11	(Argentina) Juan Brunetta		(substituted off) 83'
MF	7	(Argentina) Ángel Correa
FW	10	(France) André-Pierre Gignac		(substituted off) 71'
Substitutions:
GK	25	(Mexico) Carlos Felipe Rodríguez
DF	4	(Mexico) Juanjo Purata		(substituted on) 83'
DF	19	(Mexico) Iván López
DF	33	(Mexico) Rafael Guerrero
DF	35	(Mexico) Osvaldo Rodríguez
MF	6	(Mexico) Juan Pablo Vigón
MF	20	(Mexico) Javier Aquino		(substituted on) 85'
MF	24	(Mexico) Marcelo Flores
FW	9	(Argentina) Nicolás Ibáñez		(substituted on) 71'
FW	22	(Mexico) Uriel Antuna		(substituted on) 83'
Manager:
(Argentina) Guido Pizarro

GK	1	(Mexico) Hugo González
DF	19	(Argentina) Santiago Simón
DF	4	(Uruguay) Bruno Méndez		(substituted off) 58'
DF	25	(Mexico) Everardo López
DF	6	(Uruguay) Federico Pereira	(yellow card) 90+2'
DF	20	(Mexico) Jesús Gallardo	(yellow card) 24'
MF	10	(Mexico) Jesús Angulo		(substituted off) 58'
MF	14	(Mexico) Marcel Ruiz (c)
MF	5	(Argentina) Franco Romero
MF	8	(Argentina) Nicolás Castro		(substituted off) 86'
FW	26	(Portugal) Paulinho		(substituted off) 78'
Substitutions:
GK	22	(Mexico) Luis García
DF	2	(Mexico) Diego Barbosa		(substituted on) 58'
DF	3	(Mexico) Antonio Briseño
MF	17	(Mexico) Mauricio Isais
MF	7	(Mexico) Juan Pablo Domínguez		(substituted on) 86'
MF	16	(Mexico) Héctor Herrera
MF	24	(United States) Fernando Arce Jr.
MF	11	(Brazil) Helinho		(substituted on) 78'
FW	23	(Mexico) Oswaldo Virgen
FW	31	(Paraguay) Robert Morales	(red card) 90+2'	(substituted on) 58'
Manager:
(Argentina) Antonio Mohamed

Assistant referees:
Christian Kiabek Espinosa (Mexico City)
Michel Alejandro Morales (Mexico City)
Fourth official:
Daniel Quintero Huitrón (Jalisco)
Video assistant referee:
Guillermo Pacheco Larios (Sonora)
Assistant video assistant referee:
Ismael Rosario López (Sinaloa)

==== Statistics ====
Statistic	UANL	Toluca
Goals scored	1	0
Total shots	10	9
Shots on target	2	1
Saves	1	2
Ball possession	50%	50%
Corner kicks	8	0
Fouls committed	16	15
Offsides	2	1
Yellow cards	2	2
Red cards	0	1

=== Second leg ===
14 December 2025
19:00 CST (UTC−6)

Toluca	2–1 (a.e.t.)	Tigres UANL
Helinho 40'; Paulinho 52'	Report	Gorriarán 14'
Penalties
Vega (penalty scored); Simón (penalty scored); Pereira (penalty missed); Gallardo (penalty scored); Romero (penalty scored); Virgen (penalty scored); Arce (penalty scored); Méndez (penalty scored); Barbosa (penalty scored); Domínguez (penalty missed); García (penalty missed); Vega (penalty scored)	9–8	(penalty missed) Ibáñez; (penalty scored) Gorriarán; (penalty scored) Herrera; (penalty scored) Antuna; (penalty scored) Correa; (penalty scored) Vigón; (penalty scored) Purata; (penalty scored) Garza; (penalty scored) Aquino; (penalty missed) Joaquim; (penalty missed) Guzmán; (penalty missed) Correa

Estadio Nemesio Díez, Toluca
Referee: César Arturo Ramos (Sinaloa)

2–2 on aggregate. Toluca won 9–8 on penalty kicks.

==== Details ====
Toluca	Tigres UANL

GK	22	(Mexico) Luis García
DF	19	(Argentina) Santiago Simón	(yellow card) 45+3'
DF	25	(Mexico) Everardo López		(substituted off) 112'
DF	6	(Uruguay) Federico Pereira	(yellow card) 12'
DF	20	(Mexico) Jesús Gallardo
MF	11	(Brazil) Helinho		(substituted off) 73'
MF	10	(Mexico) Jesús Angulo		(substituted off) 80'
MF	14	(Mexico) Marcel Ruiz (c)		(substituted off) 113'
MF	5	(Argentina) Franco Romero
MF	8	(Argentina) Nicolás Castro		(substituted off) 90'
FW	26	(Portugal) Paulinho	(yellow card) 69'	(substituted off) 90+3'
Substitutions:
GK	1	(Mexico) Hugo González
DF	2	(Mexico) Diego Barbosa	(yellow card) 117'	(substituted on) 90+3'
DF	3	(Mexico) Antonio Briseño
DF	4	(Uruguay) Bruno Méndez		(substituted on) 90'
MF	17	(Mexico) Mauricio Isais
MF	7	(Mexico) Juan Pablo Domínguez		(substituted on) 73'
MF	16	(Mexico) Héctor Herrera
MF	24	(United States) Fernando Arce Jr.		(substituted on) 113'
FW	9	(Mexico) Alexis Vega		(substituted on) 80'
FW	23	(Mexico) Oswaldo Virgen		(substituted on) 112'
Manager:
(Argentina) Antonio Mohamed

GK	1	(Argentina) Nahuel Guzmán
DF	14	(Mexico) Jesús Garza
DF	2	(Brazil) Joaquim
DF	4	(Mexico) Juanjo Purata
DF	3	(United States) Marco Farfan		(substituted off) 46'
MF	23	(Brazil) Rômulo		(substituted off) 106'
MF	8	(Uruguay) Fernando Gorriarán (c)
MF	16	(Mexico) Diego Lainez		(substituted off) 106'
MF	11	(Argentina) Juan Brunetta	(yellow card) 78'	(substituted off) 90'
MF	7	(Argentina) Ángel Correa	(yellow card) 64'
FW	10	(France) André-Pierre Gignac		(substituted off) 57'
Substitutions:
GK	25	(Mexico) Carlos Felipe Rodríguez
DF	19	(Mexico) Iván López
DF	33	(Mexico) Rafael Guerrero
DF	35	(Mexico) Osvaldo Rodríguez
MF	6	(Mexico) Juan Pablo Vigón		(substituted on) 106'
MF	20	(Mexico) Javier Aquino		(substituted on) 46'
MF	24	(Mexico) Marcelo Flores
FW	9	(Argentina) Nicolás Ibáñez		(substituted on) 57'
FW	22	(Mexico) Uriel Antuna		(substituted on) 106'
FW	77	(Mexico) Ozziel Herrera		(substituted on) 90'
Manager:
(Argentina) Guido Pizarro

Assistant referees:
Alberto Morín Méndez (Chihuahua)
Marco Antonio Bisguerra (Guanajuato)
Fourth official:
Luis Enrique Santander (Guanajuato)
Video assistant referee:
Diana Stephanía Pérez (Guanajuato)
Assistant video assistant referee:
Érick Yair Miranda (Guanajuato)

==== Statistics ====
Statistic	Toluca	Tigres UANL
Goals scored	2	2
Total shots	30	7
Shots on target	12	2
Saves	1	10
Ball possession	67%	33%
Corner kicks	11	5
Fouls committed	17	16
Offsides	1	2
Yellow cards	4	3
Red cards	0	0

== Statistics ==
=== Goalscorers ===
There were 46 goals scored in 17 matches, for an average of 2.71 goals per match.

3 goals

- (Argentina) Juan Brunetta (Tigres UANL)
- (Portugal) Paulinho (Toluca)

2 goals

- (Mexico) Germán Berterame (Monterrey)
- (Argentina) Ángel Correa (Tigres UANL)
- (Morocco) Mourad El Ghezouani (Tijuana)
- (Uruguay) Gabriel Fernández (Cruz Azul)
- (Mexico) Gilberto Mora (Tijuana)
- (Brazil) Helinho (Toluca)
- (Brazil) Kenedy (Pachuca)

1 goal

- (Mexico) Fidel Ambríz (Monterrey)
- (Mexico) Antonio Briseño (Toluca)
- (Argentina) Ezequiel Bullaude (Tijuana)
- (Venezuela) Jhonder Cádiz (Pachuca)
- (Spain) Sergio Canales (Monterrey)
- (Mexico) Kevin Castañeda (Tijuana)
- (United States) Cade Cowell (Guadalajara)
- (Mexico) Roberto de la Rosa (Monterrey)
- (Brazil) Madson (Juárez)
- (Colombia) Óscar Estupiñán (Juárez)
- (Mexico) Bryan González (Guadalajara)
- (Uruguay) Fernando Gorriarán (Tigres UANL)
- (Mexico) Ozziel Herrera (Tigres UANL)
- (Argentina) Nicolás Ibáñez (Tigres UANL)
- (Mexico) Jeremy Márquez (Cruz Azul)
- (Colombia) Jesús Murillo (Juárez)
- (Uruguay) Federico Pereira (Toluca)
- (Spain) Sergio Ramos (Monterrey)
- (Mexico) Carlos Rodríguez (Cruz Azul)
- (Panama) José Luis Rodríguez (Juárez)
- (Ecuador) Enner Valencia (Pachuca)
- (Mexico) Juan Pablo Vigón (Tigres UANL)
- (Ecuador) Pedro Vite (Pumas UNAM)
- (United States) Alejandro Zendejas (América)
- (Colombia) Raúl Zúñiga (América)

1 own goal

- (Mexico) Juanjo Purata (against Cruz Azul)

=== Assists ===
2 assists

- (France) André-Pierre Gignac (Tigres UANL)
- (Brazil) Helinho (Toluca)
- (Panama) José Luis Rodríguez (Juárez)
- (Mexico) Jesús Vega (TIjuana)

1 assist

- (Mexico) Roberto Alvarado (Guadalajara)
- (Mexico) Diego Barbosa (Toluca)
- (Argentina) Juan Brunetta (Tigres UANL)
- (Mexico) Alan Bautista (Pachuca)
- (Ecuador) José Caicedo (Pumas UNAM)
- (Argentina) Nicolás Castro (Toluca)
- (Mexico) Ricardo Chávez (Monterrey)
- (Mexico) Jesús Corona (Monterrey)
- (United States) Cade Cowell (Guadalajara
- (Mexico) Jonathan dos Santos (América)
- (Uruguay) Gabriel Fernández (Cruz Azul)
- (Mexico) Jesús Garza (Tigres UANL)
- (Argentina) Nicolás Ibáñez (Tigres UANL)
- (Morocco) Oussama Idrissi (Pachuca)
- (Mexico) Diego Lainez (Tigres UANL)
- (Mexico) Jeremy Márquez (Cruz Azul)
- (Mexico) Alejandro Mayorga (Juárez)
- (Mexico) Carlos Rodríguez (Cruz Azul)
- (Argentina) Franco Romero (Toluca)
- (Ecuador) Enner Valencia (Pachuca)
- (Brazil) Rômulo (Tigres UANL)

=== Discipline ===
Player	Club	Offense(s)	Suspension(s)
(Panama) Adalberto Carrasquilla	Pumas UNAM	Received 5th (yellow card) of season vs Cruz Azul (Week 17, 8 November 2024)	Play-in round Serie B vs Juárez (20 November 2025)
(Argentina) Lorenzo Faravelli	Cruz Azul	(red card) vs Pumas UNAM (Week 17, 8 November 2024)	Quarter-finals vs Guadalajara (First leg; 27 November 2025)
(Mexico) Alejandro Mayorga	Juárez	(red card) in Play-in round vs Tijuana (Serie A, 20 November 2025)	8th seed match vs Pachuca (23 November 2025)
(Mexico) Brian García	Pachuca	(red card) in Play-in round vs Juárez (8th seed match, 23 November 2025)	Week 1 of Clausura 2026 season
(Mexico) Víctor Guzmán	Pachuca	(red card) in Play-in round vs Juárez (8th seed match, 23 November 2025)	Week 1 of Clausura 2026 season
(Mexico) Jairo Torres	Juárez	(red card) in Play-in round vs Pachuca (8th seed match, 23 November 2025)	Quarter-finals vs Toluca (First leg; 26 November 2025)
(Argentina) Jorge Rodríguez	Monterrey	(yellow card) (yellow-red card) in Quarterfinals vs América (Second leg, 29 November 2025)	Semi-finals vs Toluca (First leg; 3 December 2025)
(Paraguay) Robert Morales	Toluca	(red card) in Finals vs Tigres UANL (First leg, 11 December 2025)	Finals vs Tigres UANL (Second leg; 14 December 2025)
