= 2025–26 Liga MX season =

79th professional season of the top-flight football league in Mexico

Liga MX
- Season: 2025–26
- Champions: Apertura: Toluca (12th title); Clausura: Cruz Azul (10th title)
- Champions Cup: Cruz Azul; Toluca; Guadalajara; Tigres UANL; América; Pumas UNAM; Pachuca; Monterrey; León
- Matches: 306; Apertura: 153; Clausura: 153
- Goals: 889 (2.91 per match); Apertura: 475 (3.1 per match); Clausura: 414 (2.71 per match)
- Top goalscorer: Apertura: Armando González; João Pedro; Paulinho (12 goals each); Clausura: João Pedro (14 goals)
- Biggest home win: Apertura: Tigres UANL 7–0 Puebla (8 August 2025); Clausura: Guadalajara 5–0 León (18 March 2026); Guadalajara 5–0 Puebla (18 April 2026)
- Biggest away win: Apertura: Atlas 0–3 Pachuca (9 August 2025); Mazatlán 1–4 Pumas UNAM (12 September 2025); Guadalajara 0–3 Toluca (20 September 2025); Santos Laguna 1–4 Atlético San Luis (21 September 2025); Clausura: Mazatlán 1–5 Monterrey (16 January 2026); Puebla 0–4 América (20 February 2026)
- Highest scoring: Apertura: Toluca 6–2 Monterrey (24 September 2025); Tigres UANL 5–3 Necaxa (17 October 2025); FC Juárez 4–4 Puebla (24 October 2025); Clausura: Juárez 3–4 Cruz Azul (30 January 2026); Mazatlán 4–3 Toluca (22 April 2026)
- Longest winning run: Apertura: 7 matches Cruz Azul; Monterrey; Toluca; Clausura: 6 matches Guadalajara
- Longest unbeaten run: Apertura: 11 matches Tigres UANL; Clausura: 12 matches Toluca
- Longest winless run: Apertura: 10 matches Mazatlán; 9 matches Santos Laguna
- Longest losing run: Apertura: 5 matches Santos Laguna; Clausura: 5 matches Mazatlán
- Highest attendance: Apertura: 50,910; Monterrey vs América (20 September 2025); Clausura: 48,853; Monterrey vs Guadalajara (21 March 2026)
- Lowest attendance: Apertura: 6,053; Juárez vs Pachuca (18 October 2025); Clausura: 6,472; Mazatlán vs Juárez (9 January 2026)
- Total attendance: Apertura: 3,270,879; Clausura: 3,340,929
- Average attendance: Apertura: 21,519; Clausura: 21,836
- Stats are from the regular season only Attendance does not include matches played behind closed doors. Source: Liga MX

The 2025–26 Liga MX season (known as the Liga BBVA MX for sponsorship reasons) was the 79th professional season of the top-flight football league in Mexico. The season was divided into two championships—the Apertura 2025 and the Clausura 2026 —each in an identical format and each contested by the same 18 teams.

== Clubs ==
A total of 18 clubs participated in the 2025–26 edition of the Liga MX. All had participated in Liga MX since the 2020–21 season. This was the final season for Mazatlan FC in the top tier, as Atlante FC acquired their registration, therefore taking their place in the league starting from the 2026–27 season.

=== Stadiums and locations ===
Club	Location	Stadium	Capacity
América	Mexico City	Estadio Ciudad de los Deportes	34,253
Atlas	Guadalajara, Jalisco	Jalisco	55,020
Atlético San Luis	San Luis Potosí, San Luis Potosí	Libertad Financiera	27,029
Cruz Azul	Puebla	Cuauhtémoc (temporary)	51,726
Guadalajara	Zapopan, Jalisco	Akron	46,232
Juárez	Ciudad Juárez, Chihuahua	Olímpico Benito Juárez	19,703
León	León, Guanajuato	León	31,297
Mazatlán	Mazatlán, Sinaloa	El Encanto	20,195
Monterrey	Guadalupe, Nuevo León	BBVA	53,500
Necaxa	Aguascalientes, Aguascalientes	Victoria	23,851
Pachuca	Pachuca, Hidalgo	Hidalgo	25,922
Puebla	Puebla, Puebla	Cuauhtémoc	51,726
Querétaro	Querétaro, Querétaro	Corregidora	34,107
Santos Laguna	Torreón, Coahuila	Corona	29,101
Tijuana	Tijuana, Baja California	Caliente	31,158
Toluca	Toluca, State of Mexico	Nemesio Díez	27,273
Tigres UANL	San Nicolás de los Garza, Nuevo León	Universitario	41,886
Pumas UNAM	Mexico City	Olímpico Universitario	58,445

1. The Estadio Azteca was closed from 2024 to 2025 due to renovations for the 2026 FIFA World Cup.

=== Stadium changes ===
Cruz Azul (Apertura 2025)
Estadio Olímpico Universitario
Capacity: 58,445

Locations of the 2025–26 Liga MX teams
Greater Mexico City Liga MX football clubs

=== Personnel and kits ===
Club	Chairman	Head coach	Captain	Kit manufacturer	Shirt sponsor(s)	
Club	Chairman	Head coach	Captain	Kit manufacturer	Front	Other
América	Santiago Baños	(Brazil) André Jardine	(Mexico) Henry Martín	Adidas	Caliente	List: Front: None; Back: Corona, Coca-Cola; Sleeves: Restonic, GNP Seguros; Shorts: Caliente; Socks: Carl's Jr.
Atlas	Aníbal Fájer	(Argentina) Diego Cocca	(Mexico) Aldo Rocha	Charly	Caliente	List: Front: Urrea, Totalplay, Perdura; Back: Seguros Atlas, Dalton Corporación, Akron Grupo; Sleeves: Berel, Omnibus de México, Red Cola, Electrolit; Shorts: Agua Skarch, Hospital Country 2000, Chimex; Socks: Perdura
Atlético San Luis	Jacobo Payán Espinosa	(Mexico) Raúl Chabrand (interim)	(Mexico) Javier Güémez	Sporelli	Canel's	List: Front: Daikin, BHFitness, Nexen Tire, Laboratorio Tequis, Cementos Moctezuma; Back: Caliente, Potosí, Seguros El Potosí; Sleeves: Primera Plus, Red Cola, Mobil; Shorts: Libertad Soluciones de Vida, H-E-B, BRR Binasa, Caliente; Socks: Cementos Moctezuma
Cruz Azul	Víctor Velázquez	(Mexico) Joel Huiqui (interim)	(Mexico) Érik Lira	Pirma	Cemento Cruz Azul	List: Front: Novibet, Nikko Auto-Parts; Back: Cemix; Sleeves: Bankaool; Shorts: None; Socks: None
Guadalajara	Amaury Vergara	(Argentina) Gabriel Milito	(Mexico) Javier Hernández	Puma	Caliente	List: Front: MG Motor, Mercado Pago; Back: Omnilife, Akron Grupo, Axen Capital; Sleeves: GNP Seguros; Shorts: Caliente, Carl's Jr., Autobuses Futura; Socks: Perdura
Juárez	Andrés Fassi	(Portugal) Pedro Caixinha	(Mexico) Sebastián Jurado	Joma	Caliente	List: Front: Caliente, Ciudad Juárez; Back: Del Rio, S-Mart; Sleeves: Volaris; Shorts: www.bravotienda.com; Socks: None
León	Jesús Martínez Murguia	(Argentina) Javier Gandolfi	(Colombia) Jaine Barreiro	Charly	Cementos Fortaleza	List: Front: Telcel, Ciudad Maderas, Office Depot; Back: Caliente, La Alemana, Mazda; Sleeves: Primera Plus, TUDN, Berel, Oxxo Gas; Shorts: Hotsson Hotels, Leche León, La Alemana, Broxel; Socks: Perdura
Mazatlán	Mauricio Lanz González	(Mexico) Sergio Bueno	(Ecuador) Jefferson Intriago	Pirma	Caliente	List: Front: Paquetexpress, Banda el Recodo, dportenis; Back: Corona, Banco Azteca, El Encanto Desarrollos; Sleeves: Primera Plus, Hilton Hotels & Resorts, Aeternus Funerales, Totalplay; Shorts: Carl's Jr., Caliente, Grupo STI, ADE1000 Pegazulejo, Nazil; Socks: None
Monterrey	José Antonio Noriega	(Argentina) Nicolás Sánchez (interim)	(Spain) Sergio Canales	Puma	Codere	List: Front: BBVA, Howo, Vidusa; Back: Tecate, Oxxo Gas, H-E-B; Sleeves: Berel, CREST México, Nowports; Shorts: Hospital Angeles; Socks: Viva Aerobus
Necaxa	Ernesto Tinajero Flores	(Uruguay) Martín Varini	(Mexico) Alexis Peña	Pirma	Rolcar	List: Front: Playdoit, J.M. Romo, Bionda, BrandMe; Back: Playdoit, Grupo San Cristóbal, Sisolar, Epa!; Sleeves: Mobil, ETN Turistar, Megacable; Shorts: Gas Noel, Carl's Jr., ETN Turistar, L'ANQGEL, Playdoit, Centro Médico La Salud; Socks: Perdura
Pachuca	Armando Martínez Patiño	(Argentina) Esteban Solari	(Argentina) Gustavo Cabral	Skechers	Cementos Fortaleza	List: Front: Playdoit, JAC, Grupo Inmobiliario Crimsa, Telcel; Back: Office Depot, Pastes Kiko's, Playdoit; Sleeves: Berel, TUDN, Laboratorio Santa María; Shorts: Héroes por la Vida, Terrawind, Playdoit, Eurus Aviation, Broxel, Autobuses de Oriente; Socks: Pegazulejo Fortec
Puebla	Manuel Jiménez García	(Spain) Albert Espigares	(Mexico) Diego de Buen	Pirma	Caliente	List: Front: Volkswagen, Nikko Autoparts; Back: Banco Azteca, Red Cola, Ciudad Maderas, Mobil Super; Sleeves: Flanax, Totalplay, Leche Tamariz, Terrawind; Shorts: Beriscan Pro, Caliente, Carl's Jr., Hospital Angeles; Socks: Perdura
Querétaro	Marc Spiegel	(Chile) Esteban González	(Mexico) Kevin Escamilla	Keuka	Pedigree	List: Front: Caliente, Conspiradores de Querétaro, Petro Figue's, Caja Morelia Valladolid, Sayer; Back: Ciudad Maderas, Afirme, M&M's, H-E-B; Sleeves: Red Cola, Bohn, Harinera Monarca, Garmo Click; Shorts: Caliente, Hospital Angeles; Socks: Perdura
Santos Laguna	Aleco Irarragorri Kalb	(Mexico) Omar Tapia (interim)	(Mexico) Carlos Acevedo	Charly	Soriana	List: Front: Peñoles, Lala, Grupo SIMSA; Back: Corona, Caliente, Lala; Sleeves: Omnibus de México, Sanatorio Español, Grupo Alameda, Berel; Shorts: Aeroméxico, Totalplay, City Club; Socks: Grupo SIMSA
Tijuana	Jorge Hank Inzunsa	(Uruguay) Sebastián Abreu	(Colombia) Christian Rivera	Reebok	Caliente	List: Front: Carl's Jr.; Back: Calimax, Caliente, Afirme, Telcel; Sleeves: Autobuses Baja California, Caliente; Shorts: Petsa Express, Billú, Caliente, Sukarne; Socks: Evervital
Toluca	Francisco Suinaga Conde	(Argentina) Antonio Mohamed	(Mexico) Alexis Vega	New Balance	Roshfrans	List: Front: None; Back: Corona, Caliente; Sleeves: Red Cola, Roshfrans; Shorts: Caliente; Socks: None
Tigres UANL	Mauricio Culebro	(Argentina) Guido Pizarro	(Uruguay) Fernando Gorriarán	Adidas	Cemex	List: Front: Cemento Monterrey; Back: Tecate, Afirme, H-E-B; Sleeves: Berel, Telcel, Chirey; Shorts: Oxxo Gas, Vertua; Socks: Viva Aerobus
Pumas UNAM	Luis Raúl González	(Mexico) Efraín Juárez	(Costa Rica) Keylor Navas	Nike	DHL	List: Front: Mifel; Back: Telcel, Suzuki, Caliente; Sleeves: Raloy Lubricantes, Berel, GNP Seguros; Shorts: Autobuses Futura, KEM Autopartes; Socks: None

=== Managerial/coaching changes ===
Club	Outgoing manager/coach	Manner of departure	Date of vacancy	Replaced by	Date of appointment	Position in table	Ref.
Pre-Apertura changes
Guadalajara	(Mexico) Gerardo Espinoza	Sacked	21 April 2025	(Argentina) Gabriel Milito	26 May 2025	Pre–season	
Atlético San Luis	(Spain) Domènec Torrent	Mutual agreement	29 April 2025	(Spain) Guillermo Abascal	30 May 2025	Pre–season	
Tijuana	(Mexico) Cirilo Saucedo (Interim)	End of tenure as caretaker	30 April 2025	(Uruguay) Sebastián Abreu	30 April 2025	Pre–season	
Santos Laguna	(Argentina) Fernando Ortiz	Sacked	5 May 2025	(Spain) Francisco	10 May 2025	Pre–season	
Monterrey	(Argentina) Martín Demichelis	Sacked	11 May 2025	(Spain) Domènec Torrent	21 May 2025	Pre–season	
Mazatlán	(Mexico) Víctor Manuel Vucetich	Resigned	13 May 2025	(Uruguay) Robert Siboldi	20 May 2025	Pre–season	
Pachuca	(Uruguay) Guillermo Almada	Resigned	28 May 2025	(Mexico) Jaime Lozano	29 May 2025	Pre–season	
Cruz Azul	(Uruguay) Vicente Sánchez	Mutual agreement	6 June 2025	(Argentina) Nicolás Larcamón	16 June 2025	Pre–season	
Necaxa	(Argentina) Nicolás Larcamón	Mutual agreement	12 June 2025	(Argentina) Fernando Gago	12 June 2025	Pre–season	
Apertura changes
Atlas	(Mexico) Gonzalo Pineda	Resigned	10 August 2025	(Argentina) Diego Cocca	12 August 2025	10th	
Puebla	(Argentina) Pablo Guede	Mutual agreement	16 August 2025	(Argentina) Martín Bravo (Interim)	16 August 2025	16th	
Puebla	(Argentina) Martín Bravo (Interim)	End of tenure as caretaker	22 August 2025	(Argentina) Hernán Cristante	22 August 2025	17th	
León	(Argentina) Eduardo Berizzo	Resigned	27 September 2025	(Mexico) Ignacio Ambríz	29 September 2025	11th	
Pachuca	(Mexico) Jaime Lozano	Sacked	10 November 2025	(Argentina) Esteban Solari	18 November 2025	9th	
Pre–Clausura changes
Puebla	(Argentina) Hernán Cristante	Sacked	12 November 2025	(Spain) Albert Espigares	20 November 2025	Pre–season	
Querétaro	(Mexico) Benjamín Mora	End of contract	15 November 2025	(Chile) Esteban González	6 December 2025	Pre–season	
Necaxa	(Argentina) Fernando Gago	Sacked	26 November 2025	(Uruguay) Martín Varini	8 December 2025	Pre–season	
Juárez	(Uruguay) Martín Varini	End of contract	1 December 2025	(Portugal) Pedro Caixinha	4 December 2025	Pre–season	
Mazatlán	(Uruguay) Robert Siboldi	Resigned	12 December 2025	(Mexico) Christian Ramírez	12 December 2025	Pre–season	
Clausura changes
Mazatlán	(Mexico) Christian Ramírez	Sacked	20 January 2026	(Mexico) Sergio Bueno	20 January 2026	18th	
Santos Laguna	(Spain) Francisco	Sacked	17 February 2026	(Mexico) Omar Tapia (interim)	17 February 2026	18th	
Monterrey	(Spain) Domènec Torrent	Sacked	1 March 2026	(Argentina) Nicolás Sánchez (interim)	2 March 2026	9th	
León	(Mexico) Ignacio Ambríz	Resigned	14 March 2026	(Mexico) Alejandro Corona (interim)	15 March 2026	15th	
León	(Mexico) Alejandro Corona (interim)	End of tenure as caretaker	20 March 2026	(Argentina) Javier Gandolfi	20 March 2026	16th	
Atlético San Luis	(Spain) Guillermo Abascal	Sacked	23 March 2026	(Mexico) Raúl Chabrand (interim)	23 March 2026	15th	
Cruz Azul	(Argentina) Nicolás Larcamón	Sacked	22 April 2026	(Mexico) Joel Huiqui (interim)	22 April 2026	4th	

== Torneo Apertura ==
The Apertura 2025 was the first tournament of the season and began on 11 July 2025. The defending champions were Toluca.

For the 2025 Leagues Cup, there was only a one-weekend break for the group stage, which was played between 29 July and 7 August. The rest of the competition was played midweek, so there was no month-long break as in previous seasons.

=== Regular phase ===
==== League table ====
Pos	Team	Pld	W	D	L	GF	GA	GD	Pts	Qualification
1	Toluca (C)	17	11	4	2	43	18	+25	37	Qualification for the quarter–finals (Note: The first six places in the table qualified for the Liguilla quarter-finals.)
2	Tigres UANL	17	10	6	1	35	16	+19	36	Qualification for the quarter–finals
3	Cruz Azul	17	10	5	2	32	20	+12	35	Qualification for the quarter–finals
4	América	17	10	4	3	33	18	+15	34	Qualification for the quarter–finals
5	Monterrey	17	9	4	4	33	29	+4	31	Qualification for the quarter–finals
6	Guadalajara	17	9	2	6	29	22	+7	29	Qualification for the quarter–finals
7	Tijuana	17	6	6	5	29	23	+6	24	Qualification for the play-in round (Note: Teams ranked 7th to 10th qualified for the play-in round.)
8	Juárez	17	6	5	6	27	28	−1	23	Qualification for the play-in round
9	Pachuca	17	6	4	7	21	21	0	22	Qualification for the play-in round
10	Pumas UNAM	17	5	6	6	24	25	−1	21	Qualification for the play-in round
11	Santos Laguna	17	6	2	9	22	28	−6	20	
12	Querétaro	17	6	2	9	19	29	−10	20	
13	Necaxa	17	4	5	8	24	32	−8	17	
14	Atlas	17	4	5	8	24	35	−11	17	
15	Atlético San Luis	17	5	1	11	25	29	−4	16	
16	Mazatlán	17	2	8	7	20	29	−9	14	
17	León	17	3	4	10	14	31	−17	13	
18	Puebla	17	3	3	11	21	42	−21	12	

Source: Liga MX
Rules for classification: 1) Points; 2) Goal difference; 3) Number of goals scored; 4) Head-to-head results between tied teams; 5) Number of goals scored away; 6) Highest relegation coefficient; 7) Fair Play points
(C) Champions

==== Results ====
Clubs played every other once (either home or away), completing a total of 17 rounds.

Home \ Away	AMÉ	ATL	ASL	CAZ	GUA	JUÁ	LEÓ	MAZ	MON	NEC	PAC	PUE	QUE	SAN	TIJ	TOL	UNL	UNM
América	—	—	—	—	1–2	—	2–0	—	—	—	2–0	2–1	1–0	3–0	3–1	—	—	4–1
Atlas	2–4	—	—	3–3	—	3–1	2–0	—	—	3–2	0–3	—	—	2–2	—	0–0	—	—
Atlético San Luis	0–1	2–0	—	1–2	—	1–2	—	—	0–1	3–4	—	—	—	—	1–1	1–3	—	—
Cruz Azul	2–1	—	—	—	—	3–2	4–1	0–0	2–0	—	—	—	2–2	3–2	—	1–0	—	2–3
Guadalajara	—	4–1	4–3	1–2	—	1–2	—	2–0	4–2	3–1	—	—	—	—	—	0–3	0–0	—
Juárez	1–1	—	—	—	—	—	2–0	1–0	—	—	2–2	4–4	1–2	2–1	—	0–2	—	3–1
León	—	—	0–1	—	1–0	—	—	2–2	1–3	—	1–1	1–2	3–0	—	—	2–4	—	1–1
Mazatlán	2–2	1–1	2–1	—	—	—	—	—	—	1–1	—	2–1	—	2–2	2–2	—	2–2	1–4
Monterrey	2–2	3–1	—	—	—	4–2	—	3–2	—	3–0	—	—	—	1–0	—	—	1–1	1–1
Necaxa	1–1	—	—	1–1	—	1–1	0–1	—	—	—	0–1	1–0	3–1	4–1	—	—	—	—
Pachuca	—	—	2–1	0–1	0–1	—	—	1–0	3–0	—	—	—	0–2	—	0–2	—	1–2	—
Puebla	—	2–3	0–2	0–3	0–2	—	—	—	2–4	—	2–2	—	—	1–0	4–3	—	—	—
Querétaro	—	3–3	3–2	—	1–0	—	—	1–0	0–1	—	—	3–1	—	—	—	—	0–2	0–2
Santos Laguna	—	—	1–4	—	1–0	—	2–0	—	—	—	1–0	—	3–1	—	1–0	2–4	0–1	3–0
Tijuana	—	2–0	—	2–0	3–3	1–1	5–0	—	2–2	3–0	—	—	1–0	—	—	0–0	—	—
Toluca	2–0	—	—	—	—	—	—	3–1	6–2	3–1	2–2	3–1	4–0	—	—	—	3–4	1–1
Tigres UANL	1–3	2–0	3–1	1–1	—	1–0	0–0	—	—	5–3	—	7–0	—	—	2–0	—	—	—
Pumas UNAM	—	1–0	0–1	—	1–2	—	—	—	—	1–1	2–3	0–0	—	—	4–1	—	1–1	—

Source: Liga MX
Legend: Blue = home team win; Yellow = draw; Red = away team win.
For upcoming matches, an "a" indicates there is an article about the rivalry between the two participants.

=== Regular season statistics ===
==== Top goalscorers ====
Players sorted first by goals scored, then by last name.

Rank	Player	Club	Goals
1	(Portugal) Paulinho	Toluca	12
1	(Mexico) Armando González	Guadalajara	12
1	(Italy) João Pedro	Atlético San Luis	12
4	(Mexico) Germán Berterame	Monterrey	9
4	(Spain) Sergio Canales	Monterrey	9
6	(Argentina) Juan Brunetta	Tigres UANL	8
6	(Argentina) Ángel Correa	Tigres UANL	8
6	(Colombia) Óscar Estupiñán	Juárez	8
9	(Montenegro) Uroš Đurđević	Atlas	7
9	(Uruguay) Gabriel Fernández	Cruz Azul	7
9	(Uruguay) Brian Rodríguez	América	7
9	(Mexico) Ángel Sepúlveda	Cruz Azul	7

Source: fotmob

==== Top assists ====
Rank	Player	Club	Assists
1	(Mexico) Alexis Vega	Toluca	9
2	(Argentina) Nicolás Castro	Toluca	7
3	(Argentina) Lucas Ocampos	Monterrey	6
4	(Mexico) Ramiro Árciga	Tijuana	5
4	(Paraguay) Diego González	Atlas	5
4	(United States) Richard Ledezma	Guadalajara	5
4	(Argentina) José Paradela	Cruz Azul	5
8	(Mexico) José Abella	Santos Laguna	4
8	(Mexico) Efraín Álvarez	Guadalajara	4
8	(Mexico) Jesús Angulo	Toluca	4
8	(Panama) Adalberto Carrasquilla	Pumas UNAM	4
8	(Mexico) Kevin Castañeda	Tijuana	4
8	(Argentina) Ángel Correa	Tigres UANL	4
8	(Uruguay) Emiliano Gómez	Puebla	4
8	(Mexico) Víctor Guzmán	Pachuca	4
8	(Mexico) Diego Lainez	Tigres UANL	4
8	(Uruguay) Brian Rodríguez	América	4
8	(Mexico) Carlos Rodríguez	Cruz Azul	4
8	(Argentina) Lucas Rodríguez	Querétaro	4
8	(Uruguay) Juan Manuel Sanabria	Atlético San Luis	4
8	(Spain) Óliver Torres	Monterrey	4
8	(Mexico) Jesús Vega	Tijuana	4

Source: fotmob

==== Clean sheets ====
Rank	Player	Club	Clean sheets	Avg.
1	(Argentina) Nahuel Guzmán	Tigres UANL	8	0.94
2	(Mexico) José Antonio Rodríguez	Tijuana	6	1.19
3	(Mexico) Luis Malagón	América	5	1.07
3	(Colombia) Kevin Mier	Cruz Azul	5	1.06
3	(Mexico) Carlos Acevedo	Santos Laguna	5	1.65
6	(Mexico) Hugo González	Toluca	4	1.10
6	(Mexico) Carlos Moreno	Pachuca	4	1.24
6	(Mexico) Raúl Rangel	Guadalajara	4	1.29
6	(Uruguay) Santiago Mele	Monterrey	4	1.67
6	(Mexico) Óscar García	Léon	4	1.71
6	(Mexico) Andrés Sánchez	Atlético San Luis	4	1.71

Source: fotmob

==== Hat-tricks ====
Player	For	Against	Result	Date	Round
(Mexico) Ángel Sepúlveda	Cruz Azul	Atlas	3–3 (A)	19 July 2025	2
(Mexico) Germán Berterame	Monterrey	Atlas	3–1 (H)	26 July 2025	3
(Spain) Sergio Canales	Monterrey	Puebla	2–4 (A)	29 August 2025	7
(Portugal) Paulinho	Toluca	Monterrey	6–2 (H)	24 September 2025	10
(Argentina) Juan Brunetta	Tigres UANL	Necaxa	5–3 (H)	17 October 2025	13
(Mexico) Armando González	Guadalajara	Atlas	4–1 (H)	25 October 2025	15

(H) – Home; (A) – Away

==== Scoring ====
- First goal of the season:
- (Mexico) Gaddi Aguirre for Atlas against Puebla
- Last goal of the season:
- (Argentina) Bruno Amione for Santos Laguna against Pachuca

==== Discipline ====
Player

- Most yellow cards: 8
  - (Spain) Rubén Duarte (Pumas)
  - (Montenegro) Uroš Đurđević (Atlas)
- Most red cards: 2
  - (Mexico) Jesús Orozco (Cruz Azul)
  - (Mexico) Haret Ortega (Santos Laguna)

Team

- Most yellow cards: 50
  - Pumas UNAM
- Most red cards: 6
  - Pachua
  - Santos Laguna
- Fewest yellow cards: 31
  - Monterrey
- Fewest red cards: 1
  - América
  - Juárez

Source: Liga MX

=== Attendance ===
Pos	Team	Total	High	Low	Average	Change
1	Monterrey	372,173	50,910	45,032	46,522	+3.8%
2	Tigres UANL	366,067	41,615	36,168	40,674	+5.8%
3	Guadalajara	319,909	40,699	25,130	35,545	+8.2%
4	Toluca	243,272	27,273	25,772	27,030	+0.5%
5	Pumas UNAM	185,452	41,350	13,910	23,182	+9.5%
6	León	205,518	25,795	20,655	22,835	−11.4%
7	América	159,215	28,700	20,398	22,745	−11.4%^{1}
8	Cruz Azul	168,401	24,426	14,101	22,714	+16.7%
9	Tijuana	194,297	29,333	17,233	21,589	+21.1%
10	Atlas	150,742	35,641	13,504	18,843	−9.9%
11	Necaxa	126,806	20,586	11,490	15,851	−20.1%
12	Atlético San Luis	124,059	22,841	10,237	15,507	−2.6%
13	Puebla	122,321	25,644	6,955	15,290	−11.4%
14	Querétaro	118,513	23,432	7,763	14,814	+2.4%
15	Pachuca	99,783	14,967	6,942	12,473	−18.6%
16	Mazatlán	95,401	18,660	7,993	10,600	−0.5%
17	Santos Laguna	103,981	19,155	7,154	11,553	−17.8%
18	Juárez	78,944	18,098	6,053	8,772	−10.4%
	League total	3,270,879	50,910	6,053	21,519	−0.1%

Source: Liga MX
Notes:
Only regular season listed.
Does not include matches played behind closed doors.

=== Final phase ===
==== Play-in round ====
The 9th place team hosted the 10th place team in an elimination game. The 7th hosted the 8th place team in the double-chance game, with the winner advancing as the 7-seed. The loser of this game then hosted the winner of the elimination game between the 9th and 10th place teams to determine the 8-seed.

Play-in games
Serie A
7	Tijuana	3
8	Juárez	1
Serie B
9	Pachuca	3
10	Pumas UNAM	1

No. 8 seed game
8	Juárez	2
9	Pachuca	1

Final seeds
7	Tijuana	No. 7 seed
8	Juárez	No. 8 seed

===== Play-in matches =====
Team 1	Score	Team 2
Tijuana	3–1	Juárez
Pachuca	3–1	Pumas UNAM

==== No. 8 seed match ====
Team 1	Score	Team 2
Juárez	2–1	Pachuca

==== Bracket ====
Quarter-finals
1	Toluca	2	0	2
8	Juárez	1	0	1
4	América	0	2	2
5	Monterrey	2	1	3
2	Tigres UANL	0	5	5
7	Tijuana	3	0	3
3	Cruz Azul	0	3	3
6	Guadalajara	0	2	2

Semi-finals
1	Toluca (s)	0	3	3
5	Monterrey	1	2	3
2	Tigres UANL (s)	1	1	2
3	Cruz Azul	1	1	2

Finals
1	Toluca (p)	0	2	2 (9)
2	Tigres UANL	1	1	2 (8)

==== Quarter-finals ====
Team 1	Agg.	Team 2	1st leg	2nd leg
Juárez	1–2	Toluca	1–2	0–0
Tijuana	3–5	Tigres UANL	3–0	0–5
Guadalajara	2–3	Cruz Azul	0–0	2–3
Monterrey	3–2	América	2–0	1–2

==== Semi-finals ====
Team 1	Agg.	Team 2	1st leg	2nd leg
Monterrey	3–3 (s)	Toluca	1–0	2–3
Cruz Azul	2–2 (s)	Tigres UANL	1–1	1–1

==== Finals ====
Team 1	Agg.	Team 2	1st leg	2nd leg
Tigres UANL	2–2 (8–9 p)	Toluca	1–0	1–2 (a.e.t.)

11 December 2025
20:00 CST (UTC−6)

Tigres UANL	1–0	Toluca
Correa 46'	Report

Estadio Universitario, San Nicolás de los Garza
Referee: Marco Antonio Ortiz (Durango)
14 December 2025
19:00 CST (UTC−6)

Toluca	2–1 (a.e.t.)	Tigres UANL
Helinho 40'; Paulinho 52'	Report	Gorriarán 14'
Penalties
Vega (penalty scored); Simón (penalty scored); Pereira (penalty missed); Gallardo (penalty scored); Romero (penalty scored); Virgen (penalty scored); Arce (penalty scored); Méndez (penalty scored); Barbosa (penalty scored); Domínguez (penalty missed); García (penalty missed); Vega (penalty scored)	9–8	(penalty missed) Ibáñez; (penalty scored) Gorriarán; (penalty scored) Herrera; (penalty scored) Antuna; (penalty scored) Correa; (penalty scored) Vigón; (penalty scored) Purata; (penalty scored) Garza; (penalty scored) Aquino; (penalty missed) Joaquim; (penalty missed) Guzmán; (penalty missed) Correa

Estadio Nemesio Díez, Toluca
Referee: César Arturo Ramos (Sinaloa)

2–2 on aggregate. Toluca won 9–8 on penalty kicks.

== Torneo Clausura ==
The Clausura tournament began on 9 January 2026. The defending champions were Toluca.

=== Off–season changes ===
Due to the need to make cuts in the schedule because of the 2026 FIFA World Cup, the play-in round was not played for this tournament.

On 8 January 2026, Cruz Azul left the Estadio Olímpico Universitario after Pumas UNAM announced that it would not renew the team's stadium rental contract. On the same day, Liga MX announced that the team would play at the Estadio Cuauhtémoc, Puebla during the tournament.

=== Regular phase ===
==== League table ====
Pos	Team	Pld	W	D	L	GF	GA	GD	Pts	Qualification
1	Pumas UNAM	17	10	6	1	34	17	+17	36	Qualification for the quarter–finals (Note: The first eight places in the table qualified for the Liguilla quarter-finals.)
2	Guadalajara	17	11	3	3	33	17	+16	36	Qualification for the quarter–finals
3	Cruz Azul (C)	17	9	6	2	31	18	+13	33	Qualification for the quarter–finals
4	Pachuca	17	9	4	4	25	19	+6	31	Qualification for the quarter–finals
5	Toluca	17	8	6	3	28	16	+12	30	Qualification for the quarter–finals
6	Atlas	17	7	5	5	16	18	−2	26	Qualification for the quarter–finals
7	Tigres UANL	17	7	4	6	28	18	+10	25	Qualification for the quarter–finals
8	América	17	7	4	6	20	17	+3	25	Qualification for the quarter–finals
9	Tijuana	17	5	8	4	19	17	+2	23	
10	León	17	7	1	9	22	32	−10	22	
11	Querétaro	17	4	8	5	17	21	−4	20	
12	Juárez	17	5	4	8	26	32	−6	19	
13	Monterrey	17	5	3	9	22	24	−2	18	
14	Atlético San Luis	17	5	3	9	24	27	−3	18	
15	Necaxa	17	5	3	9	19	25	−6	18	
16	Mazatlán	17	4	3	10	22	37	−15	15	
17	Puebla	17	3	4	10	13	26	−13	13	Team ranked last in the coefficient table (Note: The team ranked last in the coefficient table was ineligible for the final phase.)
18	Santos Laguna	17	3	3	11	20	38	−18	12	

Source: Liga MX
Rules for classification: 1) Points; 2) Goal difference; 3) Number of goals scored; 4) Head-to-head results between tied teams; 5) Number of goals scored away; 6) Highest relegation coefficient; 7) Fair Play points
(C) Champions

==== Results ====
Clubs played every other once (either home or away), completing a total of 17 rounds.

Home \ Away	AMÉ	ATL	ASL	CAZ	GUA	JUÁ	LEÓ	MAZ	MON	NEC	PAC	PUE	QUE	SAN	TIJ	TOL	UNL	UNM
América	—	0–1	0–2	1–1	—	1–2	—	2–0	1–0	2–0	—	—	—	—	—	2–1	1–4	—
Atlas	—	—	3–2	—	1–2	—	—	1–0	0–0	—	—	1–0	0–0	—	2–1	—	0–0	2–2
Atlético San Luis	—	—	—	—	2–3	—	1–2	4–1	—	—	1–1	0–1	3–0	2–0	—	—	1–2	0–2
Cruz Azul	—	2–0	3–0	—	2–1	—	—	—	—	4–1	1–2	1–0	—	—	1–1	—	2–1	—
Guadalajara	1–0	—	—	—	—	—	5–0	—	—	—	2–0	5–0	2–1	3–0	0–0	—	—	2–2
Juárez	—	3–1	2–1	3–4	0–1	—	—	—	2–2	1–2	—	—	—	—	1–2	—	2–1	—
León	2–3	2–0	—	2–1	—	3–1	—	—	—	2–1	—	—	—	2–1	0–3	—	1–2	—
Mazatlán	—	—	—	1–1	1–2	1–2	4–2	—	1–5	—	1–0	—	1–1	—	—	4–3	—	—
Monterrey	—	—	1–2	0–2	2–3	—	1–0	—	—	—	1–3	2–1	4–0	—	2–2	0–1	—	—
Necaxa	—	0–1	4–1	—	0–0	—	—	2–1	0–2	—	—	—	—	—	3–0	0–3	1–1	0–1
Pachuca	0–0	3–1	—	—	—	2–0	2–1	—	—	2–1	—	2–1	—	4–2	—	1–1	—	0–2
Puebla	0–4	—	—	—	—	1–1	0–1	2–1	—	0–0	—	—	1–2	—	—	0–0	3–1	2–3
Querétaro	1–2	—	—	1–1	—	1–1	2–0	—	—	3–1	0–0	—	—	2–2	1–2	1–0	—	—
Santos Laguna	1–1	0–1	—	1–2	—	2–2	—	1–2	3–0	1–3	—	2–1	—	—	—	—	—	—
Tijuana	0–0	—	1–1	—	—	—	—	1–1	—	—	3–1	0–0	—	1–2	—	—	1–0	1–1
Toluca	—	1–1	1–1	1–1	2–0	3–1	4–1	—	—	—	—	—	—	3–1	1–0	—	—	—
Tigres UANL	—	—	—	—	4–1	—	—	5–1	1–0	—	1–2	—	0–0	5–1	—	0–0	—	0–1
Pumas UNAM	1–0	—	—	2–2	—	4–2	1–1	3–1	2–0	—	—	—	1–1	4–0	—	2–3	—	—

Source: Liga MX
Legend: Blue = home team win; Yellow = draw; Red = away team win.
For upcoming matches, an "a" indicates there is an article about the rivalry between the two participants.

=== Regular season statistics ===
==== Top goalscorers ====
Players sorted first by goals scored, then by last name.

Rank	Player	Club	Goals
1	(Italy) João Pedro	Atlético San Luis	14
2	(Mexico) Armando González	Guadalajara	12
3	(Colombia) Diber Cambindo	León	8
3	(Paraguay) Robert Morales	Pumas UNAM	8
5	(Argentina) Juan Brunetta	Tigres UANL	7
5	(Mexico) Kevin Castañeda	Tijuana	7
5	(Brazil) Juninho	Pumas UNAM	7
7	(Argentina) Ángel Correa	Tigres UANL	6
7	(Argentina) Lucas Di Yorio	Santos Laguna	6
7	(Portugal) Paulinho	Toluca	6
7	(Colombia) Óscar Estupiñán	Juárez	6
7	(Mexico) Alfonso González	Atlas	6
7	(Argentina) José Paradela	Cruz Azul	6
7	(Uruguay) Brian Rodríguez	América	6

Source: Fotmob

==== Top assists ====
Rank	Player	Club	Assists
1	(Argentina) Ángel Correa	Tigres UANL	8
2	(Panama) Ismael Díaz	León	5
3	(Argentina) Juan Brunetta	Tigres UANL	4
3	(Argentina) Ezequiel Bullaude	Santos Laguna	4
3	(Uruguay) Gabriel Fernández	Cruz Azul	4
3	(Mexico) Jesús Gallardo	Toluca	4
3	(Mexico) Brian García	Pachuca	4
3	(Mexico) Bryan González	Guadalajara	4
3	(Mexico) Alan Medina	Pumas UNAM	4
3	(Argentina) Luca Orellano	Monterrey	4
3	(Panama) José Luis Rodríguez	Juárez	4
3	(Argentina) Carlos Rotondi	Cruz Azul	4
3	(Spain) Óliver Torres	Monterrey	4

Source: Fotmob

==== Clean sheets ====
Rank	Player	Club	Clean sheets	Avg.
1	(Costa Rica) Keylor Navas	Pumas UNAM	7	0.94
1	(Colombia) Camilo Vargas	Atlas	7	1.13
3	(Mexico) Raúl Rangel	Guadalajara	6	1.13
4	(Mexico) Luis Malagón	América	5	1.00
4	(Mexico) José Antonio Rodríguez	Tijuana	5	1.00
6	(Argentina) Nahuel Guzmán	Tigres UANL	4	1.06
6	(Mexico) Andrés Gudiño	Cruz Azul	4	1.08
6	(Mexico) Luis Cárdenas	Monterrey	4	1.31
6	(Mexico) Ricardo Gutiérrez	Puebla	4	1.53
10	(Mexico) Luis García	Toluca	3	0.78
10	(Mexico) Hugo González	Toluca	3	1.13
10	(Mexico) Andrés Sánchez	Atlético San Luis	3	1.47
10	(Argentina) Ezequiel Unsain	Necaxa	3	1.47

==== Hat-tricks ====
Player	For	Against	Result	Date	Round
(Mexico) Víctor Guzmán	Pachuca	Santos Laguna	4–2 (H)	11 April 2026	14

=== Attendance ===
Pos	Team	Total	High	Low	Average	Change
1	Monterrey	377,135	48,853	28,391	41,904	−9.9%
2	Tigres UANL	325,557	41,615	38,487	40,695	+0.1%
3	Guadalajara	303,775	43,078	34,839	37,972	+6.8%
4	América	256,011	46,884	12,560	28,446	+25.1%
5	Toluca	217,422	27,273	26,513	27,178	+0.5%
6	Pumas UNAM	244,496	42,610	19,156	27,166	+17.2%
7	León	188,011	26,668	18,694	23,501	−8.8%
8	Atlas	183,521	36,767	15,321	22,940	+21.7%
9	Tijuana	153,864	28,833	14,833	19,233	−10.9%
10	Cruz Azul	136,112	43,134	7,519	17,014	−25.1%
11	Necaxa	149,841	20,598	12,638	16,649	+5.0%
12	Puebla	146,620	37,204	8,696	16,291	−5.6%
13	Querétaro	142,326	29,822	9,663	15,814	+6.8%
14	Atlético San Luis	126,643	22,883	8,808	14,071	−38.4%
15	Santos Laguna	110,750	23,258	10,767	13,844	+19.8%
16	Pachuca	107,887	20,263	7,112	13,486	+8.1%
17	Mazatlán	90,608	19,384	6,472	11,326	+6.8%
18	Juárez	80,350	14,558	6,796	10,044	+14.5%
	League total	3,340,929	48,853	6,472	21,836	+1.5%

Source: Liga MX
Notes:
Only regular season listed.
Does not include matches played behind closed doors.

=== Final phase ===
==== Bracket ====
Quarter-finals
1	Pumas UNAM (s)	3	3	6
8	América	3	3	6
4	Pachuca	1	2	3
5	Toluca	0	0	0
2	Guadalajara (s)	1	2	3
7	Tigres UANL	3	0	3
3	Cruz Azul	3	1	4
6	Atlas	2	0	2

Semi-finals
1	Pumas UNAM (s)	0	1	1
4	Pachuca	1	0	1
2	Guadalajara	2	1	3
3	Cruz Azul	2	2	4

Finals
1	Pumas UNAM	0	1	1
3	Cruz Azul	0	2	2

==== Quarter-finals ====
Team 1	Agg.	Team 2	1st leg	2nd leg
América	6–6 (s)	Pumas UNAM	3–3	3–3
Tigres UANL	3–3 (s)	Guadalajara	3–1	0–2
Atlas	2–4	Cruz Azul	2–3	0–1
Toluca	0–3	Pachuca	0–1	0–2

==== Semi-finals ====
Team 1	Agg.	Team 2	1st leg	2nd leg
Pachuca	1–1 (s)	Pumas UNAM	1–0	0–1
Cruz Azul	4–3	Guadalajara	2–2	2–1

==== Finals ====
Team 1	Agg.	Team 2	1st leg	2nd leg
Cruz Azul	2–1	Pumas UNAM	0–0	2–1

21 May 2026
20:00 CST (UTC−6)

Cruz Azul	0–0	Pumas UNAM
	Report

Estadio Ciudad de los Deportes, Mexico City
Referee: Ismael López Peñuelas (Jalisco)
24 May 2026
19:00 CST (UTC−6)

Pumas UNAM	1–2	Cruz Azul
Morales 31'	Report	Duarte 54' (o.g.); Rotondi 90+5'

Estadio Olímpico Universitario, Mexico City
Referee: Daniel Quintero (Jalisco)

Cruz Azul won 2–1 on aggregate.

== Coefficient table ==
As of the 2020–21 season, the promotion and relegation between Liga MX and Liga de Expansión MX (formerly known as Ascenso MX) was suspended, however, the coefficient table was used to establish the payment of fines that were used for the development of the clubs of the silver circuit.

Per Article 24 of the competition regulations, the payment of $MXN160 million was distributed among the last three positioned in the coefficient table as follows: 80 million in the last place; 47 million the penultimate; and 33 million was paid by the sixteenth team in the table, as of the 2021–22 season the remaining $MXN80 million was paid through the financial remnants generated by the Liga MX itself. The team that finished last on the table started the following season with a coefficient of zero. If the last ranked team, which was Mazatlán, had repeated as the last ranked team in the 2025–26 season coefficient table, they would be fined an additional $MXN20 million.

Pos	Team	'23 A Pts	'24 C Pts	'24 A Pts	'25 C Pts	'25 A Pts	'26 C Pts	Total Pts	Total Pld	Avg	GD	Fine
1	América	40	35	27	34	34	25	195	102	1.9118	+89	Safe from paying any fine
2	Cruz Azul	17	33	42	33	35	33	193	102	1.8922	+63	Safe from paying any fine
3	Toluca	21	32	35	37	37	30	192	102	1.8824	+97	Safe from paying any fine
4	Tigres UANL	30	31	34	33	36	25	189	102	1.8529	+74	Safe from paying any fine
5	Monterrey	33	32	31	28	31	18	173	102	1.6961	+43	Safe from paying any fine
6	Guadalajara	27	31	25	21	29	36	169	102	1.6569	+36	Safe from paying any fine
7	Pumas UNAM	28	27	31	21	21	36	164	102	1.6078	+35	Safe from paying any fine
8	Pachuca	22	29	13	28	22	31	145	102	1.4216	–1	Safe from paying any fine
9	Tijuana	0	0	29	19	24	23	95	68	1.3971	+1	Safe from paying any fine
10	León	23	24	18	30	13	22	130	102	1.2745	–27	Safe from paying any fine
11	Necaxa	15	27	15	31	17	18	123	102	1.2059	–21	Safe from paying any fine
12	Atlético San Luis	23	16	30	18	16	18	121	102	1.1863	–17	Safe from paying any fine
13	Juárez	18	16	17	24	23	19	117	102	1.1471	–43	Safe from paying any fine
14	Querétaro	19	24	12	20	20	20	115	102	1.1275	–49	Safe from paying any fine
15	Atlas	17	14	22	18	17	26	114	102	1.1176	–46	Safe from paying any fine
16	Mazatlán (F)	0	0	0	0	14	15	29	34	0.8529	–24	MXN$33 million
17	Santos Laguna (F)	23	15	10	7	20	12	87	102	0.8529	–79	MXN$47 million
18	Puebla (F)	25	5	14	9	12	13	78	102	0.7647	–87	MXN$80 million

Rules for fine payment: 1) Fine coefficient; 2) Goal difference; 3) Number of goals scored; 4) Head-to-head results between tied teams; 5) Number of goals scored away; 6) Fair Play points
F = Team had to pay fine indicated
Source: Liga MX

1. 2023–24 accumulated points are not counted towards their relegation coefficient.
2. 2023–24 and 2024–25 accumulated points are not counted towards their relegation coefficient.

== Aggregate tables ==
=== 2025–26 aggregate table ===
The 2025–26 aggregate table (the sum of points of both the Apertura 2025 and Clausura 2026 seasons) was used to determine the participants for the 2027 CONCACAF Champions Cup. The league champions with the most points in the 2025–26 aggregate table qualified directly for the 2027 CONCACAF Champions Cup round of 16, while the league champion with fewer points in the aggregate table qualified for the CONCACAF Champions Cup round one. In addition, both Apertura and Clausura runners-up and the next two best-ranked teams in the table also qualified for the CONCACAF Champions Cup round one. The 2025–26 season champion (first place in table) also received US$1 million in prize money and recognition at the 2026 Balón de Oro.

Pos	Team	Pld	W	D	L	GF	GA	GD	Pts	Qualification or relegation
1	Cruz Azul (C, S)	34	19	11	4	63	38	+25	68	Qualification for the CONCACAF Champions Cup Round of 16 (Note: Qualified as the league champions with the most points in the aggregate table)
2	Toluca (A, L)	34	19	10	5	71	34	+37	67	Qualification for the CONCACAF Champions Cup Round of 16 (Note: Qualified as 2026 Leagues Cup champion)
3	Guadalajara	34	20	5	9	62	39	+23	65	Qualification for the CONCACAF Champions Cup Round One (Note: Qualified for being one of the best-ranked clubs in the table who are neither a Liga MX winner, runners-up or who did not place in the 2026 Leagues Cup top three)
4	Tigres UANL	34	17	10	7	63	34	+29	61	Qualification for the CONCACAF Champions Cup Round One (Note: As Apertura runners-up)
5	América	34	17	8	9	53	35	+18	59	Qualification for the CONCACAF Champions Cup Round One
6	Pumas UNAM	34	15	12	7	58	42	+16	57	Qualification for the CONCACAF Champions Cup Round One (Note: Qualified as Clausura runners-up)
7	Pachuca	34	15	8	11	46	40	+6	53	Qualification for the CONCACAF Champions Cup Round One
8	Monterrey	34	14	7	13	55	53	+2	49	Qualification for the CONCACAF Champions Cup Round One (Note: Qualified as 2026 Leagues Cup runners-up)
9	Tijuana	34	11	14	9	48	40	+8	47	
10	Atlas	34	11	10	13	40	53	−13	43	
11	Juárez	34	11	9	14	53	60	−7	42	
12	Querétaro	34	10	10	14	36	50	−14	40	
13	Necaxa	34	9	8	17	43	57	−14	35	
14	León	34	10	5	19	36	63	−27	35	Qualification for the CONCACAF Champions Cup Round One (Note: Qualified as third place of 2026 Leagues Cup)
15	Atlético San Luis	34	10	4	20	49	56	−7	34	
16	Santos Laguna	34	9	5	20	42	66	−24	32	
17	Mazatlán	34	6	11	17	42	66	−24	29	
18	Puebla	34	6	7	21	34	68	−34	25	Team ended last place in the coefficient table

Source: Liga MX
Rules for classification: 1) Points; 2) Goal difference; 3) Number of goals scored; 4) Head-to-head results between tied teams; 5) Number of goals scored away; 6) Highest relegation coefficient; 7) Fair Play points
(A) Apertura champion; (C) Clausura champion; (L) Leagues Cup winners; (S) Season champion

=== 2025 aggregate table ===
The 2025 aggregate table (the sum of points of both the Clausura 2025 and Apertura 2025 seasons) was used to determine the seedings for the 2026 Leagues Cup. The top three clubs in "Tier one" host at least one match at home. The first ranked club host two matches while the second and third ranked clubs host one. Clubs ranked fourth through sixth, had benefits such as a neutral venue match or reduced travel.

Pos	Team	Pld	W	D	L	GF	GA	GD	Pts	Qualification or relegation
1	Toluca	34	22	8	4	84	40	+44	74	2026 Leagues Cup Tier one
2	Tigres UANL	34	20	9	5	59	30	+29	69	2026 Leagues Cup Tier one
3	América	34	20	8	6	67	28	+39	68	2026 Leagues Cup Tier one
4	Cruz Azul	34	19	11	4	58	36	+22	68	2026 Leagues Cup Tier one
5	Monterrey	34	17	8	9	65	52	+13	59	2026 Leagues Cup Tier one
6	Pachuca	34	14	8	12	50	44	+6	50	2026 Leagues Cup Tier one
7	Guadalajara	34	14	8	12	47	43	+4	50	2026 Leagues Cup Tier two
8	Necaxa	34	14	6	14	60	61	−1	48	2026 Leagues Cup Tier two
9	Juárez	34	12	11	11	43	49	−6	47	2026 Leagues Cup Tier two
10	Tijuana	34	12	7	15	58	58	0	43	2026 Leagues Cup Tier two
11	León	34	12	7	15	38	52	−14	43	2026 Leagues Cup Tier two
12	Pumas UNAM	34	11	9	14	47	51	−4	42	2026 Leagues Cup Tier two
13	Querétaro	34	12	4	18	36	53	−17	40	2026 Leagues Cup Tier three
14	Atlas	34	8	11	15	49	67	−18	35	2026 Leagues Cup Tier three
15	Atlético San Luis	34	11	1	22	45	62	−17	34	2026 Leagues Cup Tier three
16	Mazatlán	34	6	13	15	36	55	−19	31	2026 Leagues Cup Tier three
17	Santos Laguna	34	8	3	23	37	64	−27	27	2026 Leagues Cup Tier three
18	Puebla	34	5	6	23	33	67	−34	21	2026 Leagues Cup Tier three

Source: Liga MX
Rules for classification: 1) Points; 2) Goal difference; 3) Number of goals scored; 4) Head-to-head results between tied teams; 5) Number of goals scored away; 6) Highest relegation coefficient; 7) Fair Play points

== Awards ==
=== Monthly awards ===
Tournament	Month	Manager of the Month		Player of the Month		Goal of the Month		Save of the Month		References
Tournament	Month	Manager	Club	Player	Club	Player	Club	Player	Club	References
Apertura 2025	July	(Mexico) Jaime Lozano	Pachuca	(Mexico) Ángel Sepúlveda	Cruz Azul	(Mexico) Ángel Sepúlveda	Cruz Azul	(Colombia) Camilo Vargas	Atlas	
Apertura 2025	August	(Brazil) André Jardine	América	(Spain) Sergio Canales	Monterrey	(Spain) Sergio Canales	Monterrey	(Mexico) Luis Malagón	América	
Apertura 2025	September	(Argentina) Antonio Mohamed	Toluca	(Portugal) Paulinho	Toluca	(Mexico) Bryan González	Guadalajara	(Costa Rica) Keylor Navas	Pumas UNAM	
Apertura 2025	October	(Argentina) Gabriel Milito	Guadalajara	(Mexico) Armando González	Guadalajara	(Mexico) Alexis Vega	Toluca	(Mexico) Raúl Rangel	Guadalajara	
Apertura 2025	November	(Argentina) Guido Pizarro	Tigres UANL	(Argentina) Juan Brunetta	Tigres UANL	(Mexico) Carlos Rodríguez	Cruz Azul	(Mexico) Carlos Acevedo	Santos Laguna	
Apertura 2025	December	(Argentina) Antonio Mohamed	Toluca	(Portugal) Paulinho	Toluca	(Brazil) Helinho	Toluca	(Argentina) Nahuel Guzmán	Tigres UANL	
Clausura 2026	January	(Argentina) Gabriel Milito	Guadalajara	(Mexico) Armando González	Guadalajara	(Mexico) Roberto Alvarado	Guadalajara	(Costa Rica) Keylor Navas	Pumas UNAM	
Clausura 2026	February			(Colombia) Willer Ditta	Cruz Azul					
Clausura 2026	March	(Argentina) Gabriel Milito	Guadalajara	(Mexico) Armando González	Guadalajara					
Clausura 2026	April	(Mexico) Efraín Juárez	UNAM	(Paraguay) Robert Morales	UNAM					

=== Semiannual awards ===
Apertura 2025 Best XI
Pos.	Player	Team
GK	(Argentina) Nahuel Guzmán	Tigres UANL
DF	(Colombia) Willer Ditta	Cruz Azul
DF	(Brazil) Joaquim Henrique	Tigres UANL
DF	(Mexico) Jesús Gallardo	Toluca
MF	(Mexico) Carlos Rodriguez	Cruz Azul
MF	(Argentina) Juan Brunetta	Tigres UANL
MF	(Spain) Sergio Canales	Monterrey
MF	(Mexico) Alexis Vega	Toluca
FW	(Argentina) Ángel Correa	Tigres UANL
FW	(Mexico) Armando González	Guadalajara
FW	(Portugal) Paulinho	Toluca
Manager: (Argentina) Antonio Mohamed (Toluca)

Clausura 2026 Best XI
Pos.	Player	Team
GK	(Costa Rica) Keylor Navas	Pumas UNAM
DF	(Mexico) Richard Ledezma	Guadalajara
DF	(Brazil) Eduardo Bauermann	Pachuca
DF	(Colombia) Willer Ditta	Cruz Azul
DF	(Mexico) Diego Campillo	Guadalajara
MF	(Mexico) Carlos Rodriguez	Cruz Azul
MF	(Argentina) Carlos Rotondi	Cruz Azul
MF	(Brazil) Robert Kenedy	Pachuca
MF	(Mexico) Jordán Carrillo	Pumas UNAM
FW	(Mexico) Armando González	Guadalajara
FW	(Italy) João Pedro	Atlético San Luis
Manager: (Mexico) Efraín Juárez (Pumas UNAM)

- Most Valuable Player

=== Annual awards ===
Category	Recipient	Club	Ref.
Best Goalkeeper	(Argentina) Nahuel Guzmán	Tigres UANL	
Best Full-back	(Mexico) Bryan González	Guadalajara	
Best Center-back	(Mexico) Erik Lira	Cruz Azul	
Best Defensive Midfielder	(Mexico) Marcel Ruiz	Toluca	
Best Offensive Midfielder	(Argentina) Nicolás Castro	Toluca	
Best Forward	(Italy) João Pedro	Atlético San Luis	
Best Manager	(Argentina) Antonio Mohamed	Toluca	
Best Rookie	(Mexico) Brian Gutiérrez	Guadalajara	
Balón de Oro	(Italy) João Pedro	Atlético San Luis	
Best Liga de Expansión MX Player	(Mexico) Gerardo Ruiz	Jaiba Brava	
Goal of the Year	(Mexico) Efraín Álvarez	Guadalajara	
