= Carlos Acevedo =

Mexican footballer (born 1996)

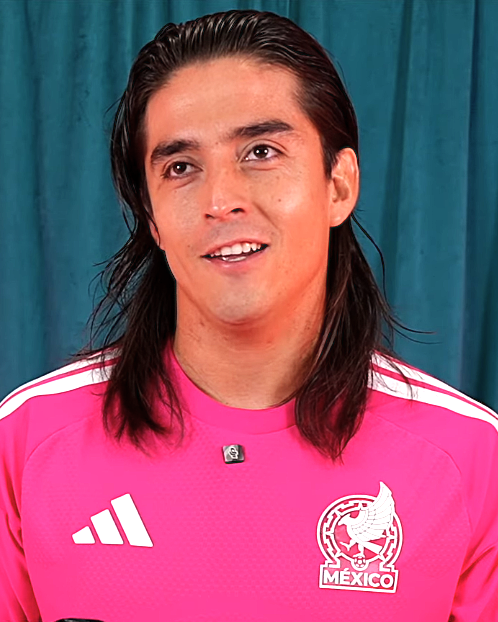
- Acevedo with Mexico in 2025

Personal information
- Full name: Carlos Acevedo López
- Date of birth: 19 April 1996 (age 30)
- Place of birth: Torreón, Coahuila, Mexico
- Height: 1.84 m (6 ft 0 in)
- Position: Goalkeeper

Team information
- Current team: Santos Laguna
- Number: 1

Youth career
- 2013–2017: Santos Laguna

Senior career*
Years	Team	Apps	(Gls)
2016–	Santos Laguna	228	(1)

International career^{‡}
2021–	Mexico	7	(0)
Medal record
Men's football
Representing Mexico
CONCACAF Nations League
Third place	2023 United States
- * Club domestic league appearances and goals as of 21 November 2026 ‡ National team caps and goals as of 22 May 2026

Carlos Acevedo López (born 19 April 1996) is a Mexican professional footballer who plays as a goalkeeper for Liga MX club Santos Laguna, which he captains, and the Mexico national team.

== Club career ==
Acevedo made his Liga MX debut with Santos Laguna on 20 August 2016 in a match against Cruz Azul which resulted in a 3–1 defeat.

Prior to the start of the 2021 Guardianes tournament, club manager Guillermo Almada named him as captain following the departure of former captain Julio Furch to sibling club Atlas.

On 10 September 2022, Acevedo scored a header against Querétaro during the 99th minute of the match, helping Santos secure a 3–3 draw.

== International career ==
In December 2021, Acevedo received his first call-up to the senior national team by Gerardo Martino, and made his debut on 8 December 2021, in a friendly match against Chile.

In June 2024, Acevedo was called up by Jaime Lozano to the 2024 Copa America following the injury of the starting goalkeeper Luis Malagón. He was not involved in any games during the tournament.

Acevedo was named in Javier Aguirre's 26-man squad for the 2026 FIFA World Cup, hosted on home soil.

== Career statistics ==
=== Club ===
As of match played on 21 November 2026

Appearances and goals by club, season and competition
Club	Season	League			Cup		Continental		Other		Total	
Club	Season	Division	Apps	Goals	Apps	Goals	Apps	Goals	Apps	Goals	Apps	Goals
Santos Laguna	2016–17	Liga MX	1	0	—		—		—		1	0
Santos Laguna	2017–18	Liga MX	2	0	13	0	—		—		15	0
Santos Laguna	2018–19	Liga MX	6	0	3	0	1 (Note: Appearances in CONCACAF Champions League)	0	—		10	0
Santos Laguna	2019–20	Liga MX	4	0	7	0	—		—		11	0
Santos Laguna	2020–21	Liga MX	42	0	—		—		—		42	0
Santos Laguna	2021–22	Liga MX	29	0	—		2	0	—		31	0
Santos Laguna	2022–23	Liga MX	37	1	4 (Note: Appearances in Copa Sky por México)	0	—		—		41	1
Santos Laguna	2023–24	Liga MX	25	0	—		—		—		25	0
Santos Laguna	2024–25	Liga MX	33	0	—		—		3 (Note: Appearances in Leagues Cup)	0	36	0
Santos Laguna	2025–26	Liga MX	32	0	—		—		2	0	34	0
Santos Laguna	2026–27	Liga MX	17	0	—		—		2	0	19	0
Career total			228	1	27	0	3	0	7	0	265	1

=== International ===
As of match played on 19 April 2023

National team	Year	Apps	Goals
Mexico	2021	1	0
Mexico	2022	3	0
Mexico	2023	2	0
Mexico	2024	0	0
Mexico	2025	0	0
Total		6	0

== Honours ==
Santos Laguna

- Liga MX: Clausura 2018

Individual

- Liga MX All-Star: 2022, 2026
- Liga MX Save of the Month: November 2025

== See also ==
- List of goalscoring goalkeepers
