= Alexis Vega (Mexican footballer) =

Mexican footballer (born 1997)

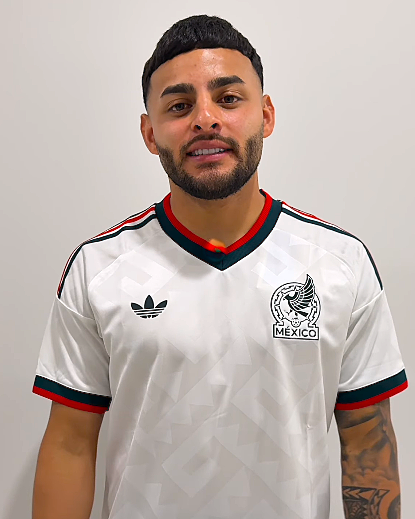
- Vega with Mexico in 2026

Personal information
- Full name: Ernesto Alexis Vega Rojas
- Date of birth: 25 November 1997 (age 28)
- Place of birth: Mexico City, Mexico
- Height: 1.75 m (5 ft 9 in)
- Position: Winger

Team information
- Current team: Toluca
- Number: 9

Youth career
- 2007–2012: Pumas
- 2012–2016: Toluca

Senior career*
Years	Team	Apps	(Gls)
2016–2019	Toluca	58	(12)
2019–2023	Guadalajara	140	(26)
2024–	Toluca	87	(30)

International career^{‡}
2021	Mexico U23	14	(4)
2019–	Mexico	55	(7)
Medal record
Men's football
Representing Mexico
CONCACAF Gold Cup
Winner	2025 United States–Canada
Winner	2019 United States
CONCACAF Nations League
Winner	2025 United States
Third place	2023 United States
Olympic Games
Bronze medal – third place	2020 Tokyo	Team
Olympic Qualifying Championship
Winner	2020 Mexico
- * Club domestic league appearances and goals as of 26 September 2026 ‡ National team caps and goals as of 17 November 2026

Ernesto Alexis Vega Rojas (born 25 November 1997) is a Mexican professional footballer who plays as a forward or winger for Liga MX club Toluca, which he captains, and the Mexico national team.

== Club career ==
=== Toluca ===
Vega made his senior team debut on 27 February 2016 coming on as a substitute in a home league match against Pachuca. On April 5 he scored his first professional goal for Toluca in the Copa Libertadores against Ecuadorian club Quito, the game ended 2–1 and Toluca qualified to the tournament's Round of 16. On 16 April, Vega scored his first two goals in the league against Veracruz in a 4–1 home victory.

=== Guadalajara ===
On 8 December 2018, Vega joined Guadalajara for a reported fee of US$9 million, making his transfer one of the most expensive in the club's history.

After playing six games without any goals and going three straight games without any wins, on 16 February 2019, Vega managed to score 3 goals in the 3–0 victory against town rivals Atlas, his first career hat-trick.

Prior to the start of the Apertura 2021, Vega was given the number 10 jersey. In May 2022, Vega extended his contract until 2024, becoming the highest paid player in the club's history.

=== Return to Toluca ===
On 17 January 2024, Vega's repeated disciplinary issues at Guadalajara led to his transfer to Toluca.

On 8 March 2025, after trailing behind two goals against Necaxa, Vega scored a hat-trick, finishing the match at 5–2. Vega helped Toluca to win the Clausura 2025 league title, contributing an assist and a goal via penalty kick in the finals against América, for an aggregate 2–0 victory. At the end of the season, he was the team's top scorer with 13 goals and 11 assists. He was included in the tournament's best XI and was awarded Best Attacking Midfielder and Goal of the Year by the league.

On 14 December, returning from an injury, Vega was subbed on in the second leg of the Apertura finals against Tigres UANL, defeating them in a penalty shootout 9–8 where he scored in both attempts, including the game winner.

== International career ==
=== Youth ===
Vega was called up by Jaime Lozano to participate at the 2020 CONCACAF Olympic Qualifying Championship, scoring one goal in five appearances, where Mexico won the competition. He was awarded the Golden Ball for best player and included in the tournament's Best XI. He was subsequently called up to participate in the 2020 Summer Olympics. Vega scored Mexico's final goal in a 3–1 victory over Olympic hosts, Japan, as they won the third-place match to win the bronze medal.

=== Senior ===
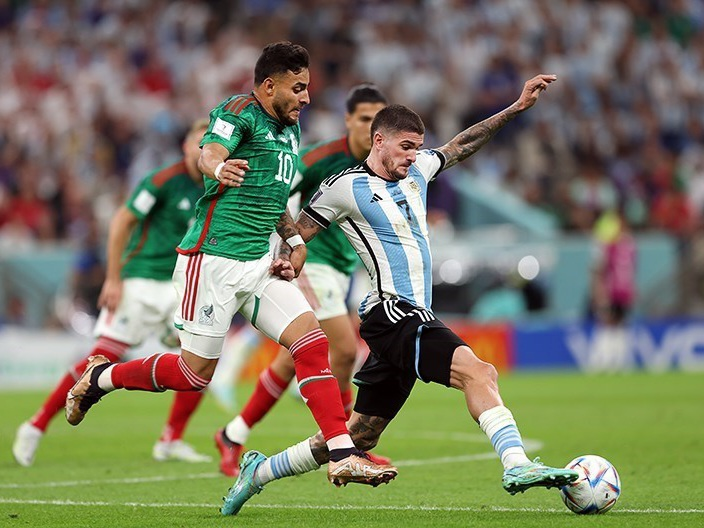
Vega disputing the ball against Argentina's Rodrigo De Paul at the 2022 World Cup

Vega made his senior national team debut on 26 March 2019, under Gerardo Martino in a friendly against Paraguay, as a 78th-minute substitute for Javier Hernández.

In May 2019, Vega was included in the provisional 2019 CONCACAF Gold Cup roster and was subsequently included in the final list. In the first group stage match against Cuba, he would score his first goal with the national team in a 7–0 thrashing. Mexico would go on to win the tournament.

In November 2022, he was included in the 26-man roster for that year's edition of the World Cup.

In June 2025, Vega was included in Mexico's roster for the Gold Cup. In the quarter-finals match against Saudi Arabia, he would score the first goal of the match in an eventual 2–0 victory.

Vega was named in the 26-man squad for the 2026 FIFA World Cup, hosted on home soil.

== Career statistics ==
=== Club ===
As of match played on 4 June 2025

Appearances and goals by club, season and competition
Club	Season	League			Cup		Continental		Other		Total	
Club	Season	Division	Apps	Goals	Apps	Goals	Apps	Goals	Apps	Goals	Apps	Goals
Toluca	2015–16	Liga MX	10	2	—		5 (Note: Appearances in Copa Libertadores)	1	—		15	3
Toluca	2016–17	Liga MX	12	1	2	0	—		—		14	1
Toluca	2017–18	Liga MX	17	3	7	2	—		—		24	5
Toluca	2018–19	Liga MX	19	6	3	0	—		—		22	6
Toluca	Total		58	12	12	2	5	1	—		75	15
Guadalajara	2018–19	Liga MX	16	4	1	0	—		—		17	4
Guadalajara	2019–20	Liga MX	24	5	4	2	—		—		28	7
Guadalajara	2020–21	Liga MX	32	4	—		—		—		32	4
Guadalajara	2021–22	Liga MX	26	6	—		—		—		26	6
Guadalajara	2022–23	Liga MX	32	6	—		—		—		32	6
Guadalajara	2023–24	Liga MX	10	1	—		—		2 (Note: Appearances in Leagues Cup)	0	12	1
Guadalajara	Total		140	26	5	2	—		2	0	147	28
Toluca	2023–24	Liga MX	15	6	—		2 (Note: Appearances in CONCACAF Champions Cup)	0	—		17	6
Toluca	2024–25	Liga MX	42	16	—		—		—		42	16
Toluca	Total		57	22	—		2	0	0	0	57	22
Career total			270	66	17	4	7	1	2	0	239	49

=== International ===
As of match played on 17 November 2026

Appearances and goals by club, season and competition
National team	Year	Apps	Goals
Mexico	2019	5 (Note: Vega additionally played a match against Martinique in 2019, which is not recognized by FIFA.)	1
Mexico	2020	1	0
Mexico	2021	5	1
Mexico	2022	14	4
Mexico	2023	2	0
Mexico	2024	7	0
Mexico	2025	14	1
Mexico	2026	7	0
Total		55	7

Scores and results list Mexico goal tally first, score column indicates score after each Vega goal.

List of international goals scored by Alexis Vega
No.	Date	Venue	Opponent	Score	Result	Competition
1.	15 June 2019	Rose Bowl, Pasadena, United States	Cuba	6–0	7–0	2019 CONCACAF Gold Cup
2.	2 September 2021	Estadio Azteca, Mexico City, Mexico	Jamaica	1–0	2–1	2022 FIFA World Cup qualification
3.	27 January 2022	Independence Park, Kingston, Jamaica	Jamaica	2–1	2–1	2022 FIFA World Cup qualification
4.	27 September 2022	Levi's Stadium, Santa Clara, United States	Colombia	1–0	2–3	Friendly
5.	9 November 2022	Estadi Montilivi, Girona, Spain	Iraq	1–0	4–0	Friendly
6.	16 November 2022	Estadi Montilivi, Girona, Spain	Sweden	1–1	1–2	Friendly
7.	28 June 2025	State Farm Stadium, Glendale, United States	Saudi Arabia	1–0	2–0	2025 CONCACAF Gold Cup

== Honours ==
Toluca

- Liga MX: Clausura 2025, Apertura 2025
- Campeón de Campeones: 2025
- Campeones Cup: 2025
- CONCACAF Champions Cup: 2026
- Leagues Cup: 2026

Mexico U23

- CONCACAF Olympic Qualifying Championship: 2020
- Olympic Bronze Medal: 2020

Mexico

- CONCACAF Gold Cup: 2019, 2025
- CONCACAF Nations League: 2024–25

Individual

- CONCACAF Olympic Qualifying Championship Golden Ball: 2020
- CONCACAF Olympic Qualifying Championship Best XI: 2020
- Liga MX All-Star: 2021, 2022, 2025
- Liga MX Player of the Month: March 2025, May 2025
- Liga MX top assist provider: Clausura 2025, Apertura 2025
- Liga MX Most Valuable Player: Clausura 2025
- Liga MX Best XI: Clausura 2025, Apertura 2025
- Liga MX Best Attacking Midfielder: 2024–25
- Liga MX Goal of the Year: 2024–25
- Liga MX Goal of the Month: February 2025, March 2025, May 2025, October 2025
- Leagues Cup Best Player: 2026
