= 2022 MLS All-Star Game =

Soccer game played in Saint Paul, Minnesota

2022 MLS All-Star Game presented by Target
- Event: 2022 Major League Soccer season
MLS All-Stars	Liga MX All-Stars
(United States) (Canada)	(Mexico)
2	1
- Date: August 10, 2022
- Venue: Allianz Field, Saint Paul, Minnesota
- Most Valuable Player: Dayne St. Clair (MLS All-Stars)
- Referee: Joe Dickerson (United States)
- Attendance: 19,727

The 2022 Major League Soccer All-Star Game was the 26th annual Major League Soccer All-Star Game, an exhibition soccer match in the United States. The game, featuring all-star teams from Major League Soccer (MLS) and Liga MX, took place on August 10, 2022, at Allianz Field in Saint Paul, Minnesota. It was the second MLS All-Star Game to be played under the inter-league format. The all-star game also included a skills challenge, concerts, and other events in the days before the match.

The MLS All-Stars won 2–1 with goals from Carlos Vela in the third minute and Raúl Ruidíaz in the 73rd minute; Liga MX earned a consolation goal in the 84th minute through a strike from Kevin Álvarez. Goalkeeper Dayne St. Clair, who made four saves, was named the match's most valuable player.

== Pre-game ==
=== Venue selection ===
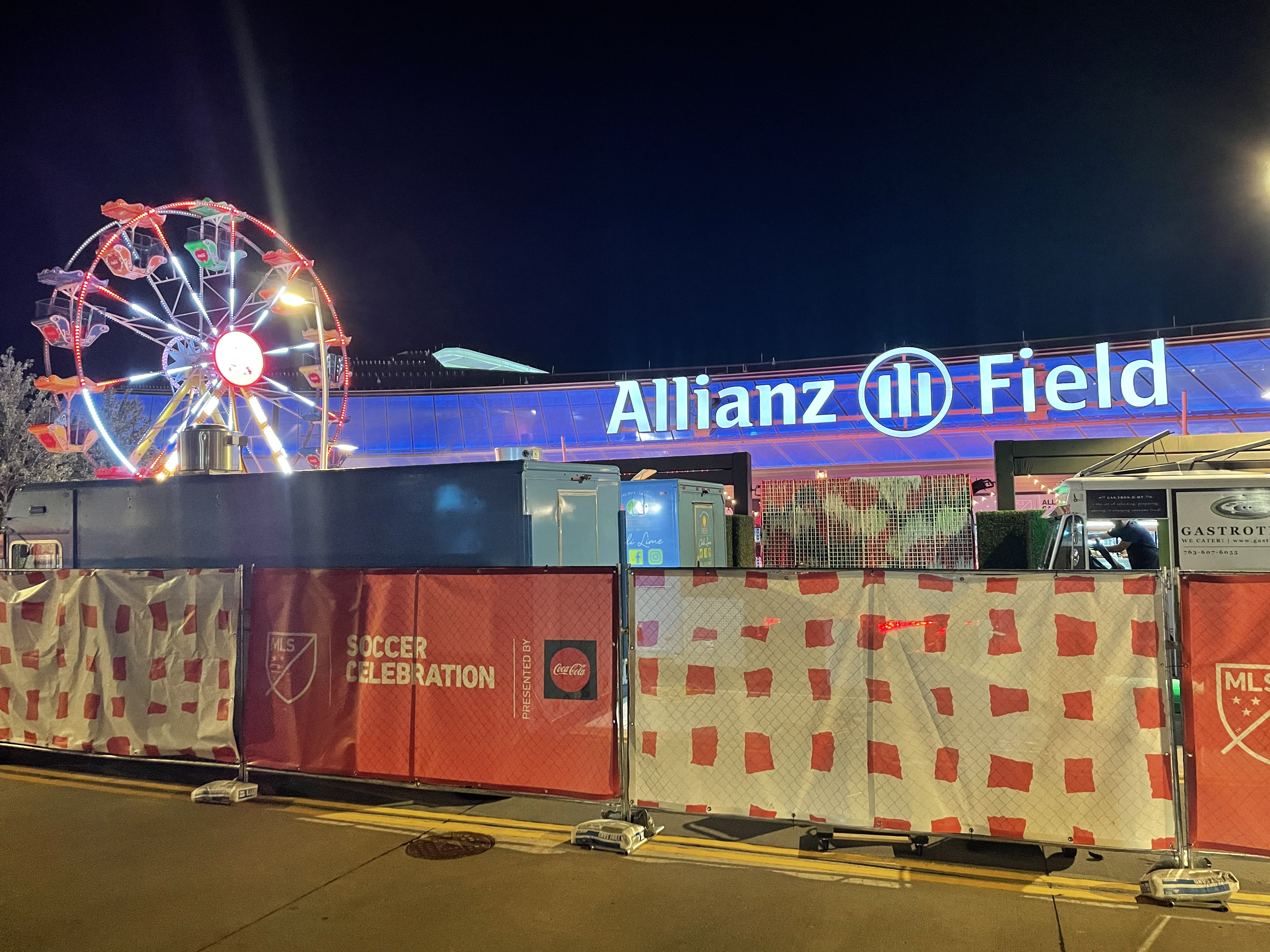
The front of Allianz Field during the MLS All Star game with a Ferris wheel featured off to the side.

Allianz Field in Saint Paul, Minnesota, home to Minnesota United FC, was announced as the host venue for the All-Star Game in October 2021. The 19,600-seat soccer-specific stadium opened in 2019 and has hosted a FIFA World Cup qualifying match, several international friendlies and CONCACAF Gold Cup matches in addition to club games.

=== Jerseys ===
The jersey for the MLS All-Stars, made by Adidas, was unveiled on August 1, 2022. It was primarily dark gray with a light purple trim and two jock tags referencing the state of Minnesota. The Liga MX All-Stars unveiled their Charly-designed jersey on the same day. It featured a black "paintbrush stroke" on a white jersey, with the names of Liga MX clubs within the stroke and sleeves.

== Squads ==
=== MLS All-Stars ===
The MLS All-Stars roster was announced on July 12, 2022. Forward Brandon Vázquez was added to the roster on August 3, 2022, to replace Valentín Castellanos, due to Castellanos' loan move to Girona. Jakob Glesnes was added as a replacement for Alexander Callens on August 4.

Note: Flags indicate national team as defined under FIFA eligibility rules; some limited exceptions apply. Players may hold more than one non-FIFA nationality.

No.	Pos.	Nation	Player
1	GK	USA	Sean Johnson (New York City FC)
2	DF	USA	DeAndre Yedlin (Inter Miami CF)
3	DF	CAN	Kamal Miller (CF Montréal)
4	DF	MEX	Julián Araujo (LA Galaxy)
5	FW	GRE	Taxi Fountas (D.C. United)
6	MF	USA	Darlington Nagbe (Columbus Crew)
7	MF	ARG	Sebastián Driussi (Austin FC)
8	MF	ESP	Ilie Sánchez (Los Angeles FC)
9	FW	PER	Raúl Ruidíaz (Seattle Sounders FC)
10	MF	ESP	Carles Gil (New England Revolution)
11	FW	MEX	Carlos Vela (Los Angeles FC)
12	DF	ECU	Diego Palacios (Los Angeles FC)
13	FW	USA	Jordan Morris (Seattle Sounders FC)

No.	Pos.	Nation	Player
14	FW	MEX	Javier Hernández (LA Galaxy)
16	MF	ARG	Emanuel Reynoso (Minnesota United FC)
17	FW	USA	Paul Arriola (FC Dallas)
18	GK	JAM	Andre Blake (Philadelphia Union)
19	FW	USA	Brandon Vázquez (FC Cincinnati)
20	FW	USA	Jesús Ferreira (FC Dallas)
23	DF	NOR	Jakob Glesnes (Philadelphia Union)
25	DF	USA	Walker Zimmerman (Nashville SC)
27	DF	GER	Kai Wagner (Philadelphia Union)
32	MF	ARG	Luciano Acosta (FC Cincinnati)
33	DF	USA	Aaron Long (New York Red Bulls)
95	MF	GER	Hany Mukhtar (Nashville SC)
97	GK	CAN	Dayne St. Clair (Minnesota United FC)

- Coach: (England) Adrian Heath (Minnesota United FC)

=== Liga MX All-Stars ===
The Liga MX All-Stars roster was announced on July 19, 2022. Juan Escobar, Guido Pizarro, Luis Quiñones and Víctor Guzmán were called up as replacements for Dória, Diego Barbosa, Jordan Carrillo and Ángel Mena.

Note: Flags indicate national team as defined under FIFA eligibility rules; some limited exceptions apply. Players may hold more than one non-FIFA nationality.

No.	Pos.	Nation	Player
1	GK	MEX	Carlos Acevedo (Santos Laguna)
2	DF	MEX	Kevin Álvarez (Pachuca)
3	DF	ARG	Hugo Nervo (Atlas)
4	DF	ARG	Lisandro López (Club Tijuana)
5	GK	ARG	Oscar Ustari (Pachuca)
6	MF	MEX	Érik Lira (Cruz Azul)
7	FW	ARG	Germán Berterame (Monterrey)
8	MF	ESP	Álvaro Fidalgo (América)
9	FW	ARG	Julio Furch (Atlas)
10	MF	MEX	Alexis Vega (Guadalajara)
11	MF	COL	Avilés Hurtado (Pachuca)
12	GK	COL	Camilo Vargas (Atlas)
13	MF	MEX	Víctor Guzmán (Pachuca)
14	DF	MEX	Luis Reyes (Atlas)

No.	Pos.	Nation	Player
15	FW	ARG	Juan Dinenno (UNAM)
16	DF	COL	Brayan Angulo (Toluca)
17	FW	MEX	Heriberto Jurado (Necaxa)
18	FW	MEX	Uriel Antuna (Cruz Azul)
19	MF	ARG	Guido Pizarro (UANL)
20	MF	MEX	Fernando Beltrán (Guadalajara)
21	DF	PAR	Juan Escobar (Cruz Azul)
22	DF	ARG	Gustavo Cabral (Pachuca)
23	MF	COL	Luis Quiñones (UANL)
24	MF	MEX	Luis Chávez (Pachuca)
26	MF	MEX	Aldo Rocha (Atlas)
27	DF	MEX	Jesús Angulo (Tigres UANL)
33	MF	COL	Julián Quiñones (Atlas)

- Coach: (Argentina) Diego Cocca (Atlas)

== Broadcasting ==
The All-Star Game was broadcast in the United States on ESPN in English and Univision in Spanish. ESPN's coverage included play-by-play commentary by Jon Champion and analysis by Taylor Twellman, as well as studio coverage by Sebastian Salazar and Herculez Gomez—including pre-game, halftime, and post-game shows. The All-Star Skills Challenge was broadcast the day before on ESPN2. In Canada, TSN carried the match in English and TVA Sports in French. ESPN's international affiliates also broadcast the All-Star Game in Mexico, Latin America, and other countries. In the United Kingdom, the match was broadcast live on Sky Sports.

The ESPN broadcast reached an estimated average of 334,000 viewers and peaked at 420,000 viewers; it was the most-viewed MLS All-Star Game since 2018.

== Skills Challenge ==
The MLS All-Stars defeated Liga MX in the Skills Challenge, winning 3–2 across five events. The 2022 All-Star Game marked the return of "Goalie Wars", a head-to-head competition between goalkeepers, which was not televised and involved four MLS Next Pro players.

== Match rules ==
- Unlimited substitutions
- Players limited to a total of 45 minutes
- Penalty shoot-out if tied at full time; no extra time

== Match ==
2022 MLS All-Star Game
August 10, 2022
7:30 p.m. CDT (8:30 p.m. EDT)

MLS All-Stars (United States) (Canada)	2–1	(Mexico) Liga MX All-Stars
Vela 3'; Ruidíaz 73' (pen.)	Report	Álvarez 83'

Allianz Field, Saint Paul, Minnesota
Attendance: 19,727
Referee: Joe Dickerson (United States)

MLS All-Stars	Liga MX All-Stars
