= Camilo Vargas =

Colombian footballer (born 1989)

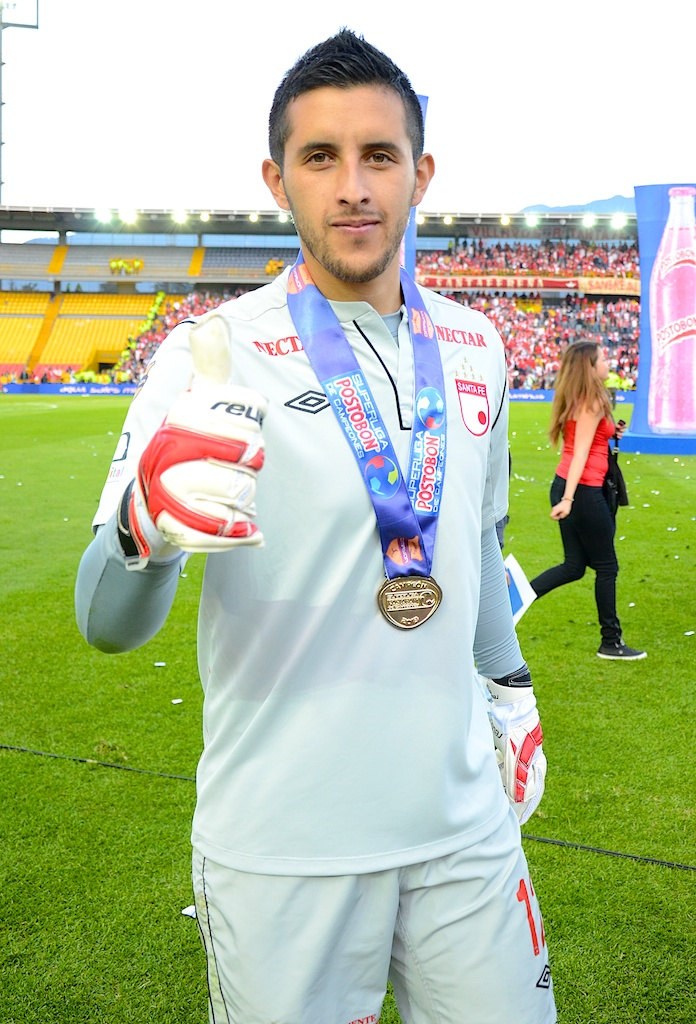
- Vargas with for Independiente Santa Fe in 2013

Personal information
- Full name: Camilo Andrés Vargas Gil
- Date of birth: 9 March 1989 (age 37)
- Place of birth: Bogotá, Colombia
- Height: 1.88 m (6 ft 2 in)
- Position: Goalkeeper

Team information
- Current team: Atlas
- Number: 12

Senior career*
Years	Team	Apps	(Gls)
2009–2014	Santa Fe	183	(2)
2015–2018	Atlético Nacional	23	(0)
2016	→ Argentinos Juniors (loan)	6	(0)
2016–2017	→ Deportivo Cali (loan)	41	(0)
2018	→ Deportivo Cali (loan)	42	(0)
2019	Deportivo Cali	25	(1)
2019–	Atlas	242	(0)

International career^{‡}
2009	Colombia U20	5	(0)
2014–	Colombia	47	(0)
Medal record
Representing Colombia
Men's football
Copa América
Runner-up	2024 United States
Third place	2021 Brazil
- * Club domestic league appearances and goals as of 23:16, 9 May 2026 (UTC) ‡ National team caps and goals as of 7 July 2026

Camilo Andrés Vargas Gil (born 9 March 1989) is a Colombian professional footballer who plays as a goalkeeper for Liga MX club Atlas and the Colombia national team.

Vargas began his career with Independiente Santa Fe, winning two Categoría Primera A titles and the Copa Colombia in 2009, before moving to Atlético Nacional in 2015. After loan spells with Argentinos Juniors in Argentina and Deportivo Cali in Colombia, he joined Cali permanently and later transferred to Atlas F.C. in 2019. With Atlas he ended a 70-year title drought, leading the club to the Liga MX Apertura 2021, the Clausura 2022, and the Campeón de Campeones, while earning recognition as one of the league's top goalkeepers with two Best XI selections, the Golden Glove, the Balón de Oro for the 2021–22 season, and inclusion in the 2022 MLS All-Star Game.

At international level, Vargas made his senior debut for Colombia in 2014 in a friendly against El Salvador. He was named in Colombia's squads for the 2014 FIFA World Cup, the 2015 Copa América, and the 2018 FIFA World Cup, without making an appearance. Vargas was also part of the squad at the 2019 Copa América, again as an unused substitute. He earned his first tournament start at the 2021 Copa América, playing in the third-place play-off against Peru, where Colombia secured the bronze medal. By the 2024 Copa América, Vargas had established himself as Colombia's starting goalkeeper, featuring throughout the tournament as the team finished runners-up.

== Club career ==
=== Independiente Santa Fe ===
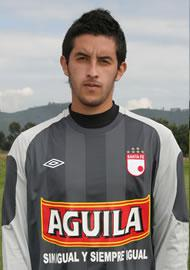
Vargas with Santa Fe in 2010

At the age of 16, Camilo Vargas joined the youth teams of Independiente Santa Fe. Camilo joined the first team and made his debut as a professional footballer with Independiente Santa Fe on March 11, 2007, in the game against La Equidad at the Estadio Metropolitano de Techo, a match for the Colombian Apertura Tournament. Vargas entered the field in the final minutes, replacing Oscar Castro in Santa Fe's 2–1 victory. Camilo continued with the first team, but also alternated with the reserve team. In 2009, Camilo won his first professional title when Independiente Santa Fe won the 2009 Copa Colombia. In the 2010 Copa Colombia, Vargas qualified Santa Fe against Real Cartagena. On September 11, the 260th Bogotá Classic was played between Santa Fe and Millonarios. He had a good match, saving a penalty and keeping the score at 0-0. That year he played 7 games, and little by little he was demonstrating his qualities as a goalkeeper.

In 2011, Camilo had more opportunities to save in both the local league and the Copa Sudamericana. He would confirm his good form when on November 23, 2011, the penultimate date of the Torneo Finalización, in the 265th derby, a corner kick was awarded in the last minute, in favor of Santa Fe. Vargas left his goalkeeping position and headed past the Millonarios defense to score the winning goal for his club. He became the man of the match. Camilo Vargas began to show himself and demonstrate that he was ready to be a starter in Independiente Santa Fe. In 2012, Camilo achieved one of his goals by being champion of the Torneo Apertura, earning the seventh star for the Cardinals, and becoming one of the key figures in the team that ended a 36-and-a-half-year drought without winning a league title. Thanks to the championship won in 2012, he played in the 2013 Superliga Colombiana against their local rival, Millonarios, champion of the Torneo Finalización. Two matches are played in this tournament at the beginning of the year. Santa Fe, with Camilo Vargas in goal, won the series, getting off to a great start in 2013. That year, Camilo Vargas was instrumental in Santa Fe reaching the semifinals of the Copa Libertadores, following strong performances in the tournament and being chosen as the man of the match twice. That year, he also began to be considered by José Néstor Pékerman to become part of the Colombian senior national team, thanks to his strong performances in the league and in the Libertadores.

In 2014, Vargas reached the peak of his professional career, becoming a figure and idol among the Santa Fe fans thanks to his strong performances in Santa Fe. He was also included on the list of 23 Colombian players who went to play in the 2014 FIFA World Cup. After the World Cup, Camilo made his debut with the national team and reached his peak with Independiente Santa Fe, being figure in almost every match he played in the red and white jersey. In addition, in the final four, Vargas scored another goal, a penalty kick, against Atlético Huila on November 22, 2014; that goal would help Santa Fe reach the final of the Torneo Finalización. In the second leg of the final against Deportivo Independiente Medellín, Camilo prevented the Paisa team from taking the title. Thus, Camilo Vargas became one of the fans' greatest idols, and with his outstanding performance he managed to earn the Cardinals' eighth star. In January 2015, in a highly controversial development, Camilo Vargas' transfer to Atlético Nacional was confirmed.

=== Atlético Nacional ===
In January 2015, Vargas signed with Atlético Nacional after nearly a decade with Santa Fe. Competition for the starting goalkeeper position was intense, and Vargas struggled to secure a regular place in the first team due to the presence of Franco Armani, who was the established starter.

Although he made appearances in league and cup matches, Vargas spent much of his time at Nacional as a backup option. To gain more playing time, the club arranged several loan moves for him during his contract period, most notably abroad in Argentina.

=== Argentinos Juniors ===
In July 2016, Vargas joined Argentinos Juniors on loan for the 2016–17 Primera B Nacional season, seeking more consistent minutes outside Colombia.

At the Buenos Aires club, he competed for the starting spot but faced difficulties adapting, making only a handful of official appearances before returning to Colombia. Despite limited action, his spell in Argentina was part of a transitional stage in his career, eventually leading to his successful loans and permanent move to Deportivo Cali.

=== Deportivo Cali ===
After being loaned out to Deportivo Cali from July 2016 to July 2017, and again during the 2018 season, Deportivo Cali confirmed on 28 November 2018 that they had exercised the purchase option and signed Vargas on a permanent deal until 2021.

During his final campaign with Cali, Vargas consolidated his reputation as one of the most reliable goalkeepers in Colombian football. He registered double-digit clean sheets across league and cup competitions and was a decisive figure in Cali's qualification to the 2019 Copa Sudamericana. His leadership and consistency between the posts drew interest from clubs abroad, particularly in Mexico, where his performances were closely monitored by scouts.

=== Atlas ===
On 6 July 2019, Vargas was announced as a new player for Atlas F.C. in Mexico's Liga MX. He quickly established himself as a cornerstone for the Guadalajara-based club, becoming the undisputed starter in his debut season. Despite Atlas’ struggles in the league table at the time, Vargas earned plaudits for his reflex saves, command of the penalty area, and penalty-stopping ability.

By 2021, Vargas had become team captain and was widely regarded as one of the top goalkeepers in Liga MX. His performances were pivotal in Atlas’ historic Liga MX Apertura 2021 title, the club's first league championship in 70 years. Vargas played every match of the playoff run and made decisive interventions in the final against Club León, helping secure the trophy through a dramatic penalty shoot-out.

The Colombian goalkeeper reinforced his status during the following Clausura 2022 campaign, where Atlas defended their title and won back-to-back league championships for the first time in club history. Vargas’ consistent shot-stopping and leadership at the back earned him the Liga MX Golden Glove and repeated selections in the league's Best XI.

With Atlas, Vargas lifted two league titles and won the Campeón de Campeones in 2022, further cementing his legacy as one of the most successful foreign goalkeepers in the club's history. He continues to serve as club captain while maintaining a starting role with the Colombian national team.

== International career ==
Since the 2014 FIFA World Cup qualifiers, Vargas has been consistently called up to the Colombia national football team, usually as a backup for David Ospina. In 2023, Vargas was promoted to first-choice goalkeeper for his national team.

Vargas was included in the squad that had a run to the 2014 World Cup quarterfinals in Brazil, but he failed to see any action during the tournament. He made his international debut shortly after, in a 3–0 win against El Salvador at the Red Bull Arena in New Jersey, on 10 October 2014. In May 2018, he was included in the team for the 2018 World Cup in Russia, although he once again failed make an appearance.

Having been an unused substitute for the 2015, 2019 and 2021 Copa América tournaments, Vargas was the main goalkeeper during 2024 Copa América, featuring in every Colombia match of the competition. He retained his starter status throughout the 2026 FIFA World Cup qualifiers. On 12 October 2023, he was sent off against Uruguay and served a one-match suspension, which featured Álvaro Montero in goal. In April 2025, it was reported that Vargas was set to undergo surgery to treat a meniscus injury, with backup keeper Kevin Mier stepping in in three of the last four qualification matches.

On 26 May 2026, Vargas was selected in the 26-man squad for the 2026 FIFA World Cup. He made his World Cup debut on 17 June at Estadio Azteca in Mexico City, against Uzbekistan. In the 60th minute of that match, he parried a volley by Eldor Shomurodov, but the rebound was headed into an empty net by Abbosbek Fayzullaev, making the partial scoreline 1-1; Colombia went on to score two more goals for a win. Vargas kept a clean sheet in each of Colombia's remaining two group fixtures against DR Congo, a 1–0 win, and Portugal, a 0–0 tie, as Colombia progressed to the knockout stage as group K leaders. Vargas proceeded to repeat his feat, keeping clean sheets in the round of 32 match against Ghana, which Colombia won 1–0, as well as in the round of 16 match against Switzerland, which finished 0–0 after 120 minutes. In the ensuing penalty shoot-out, Colombia missed one penalty and had another one saved, while Switzerland only missed one and Vargas failed to make a save, as his surnamesake Rubén Vargas sent Switzerland through to the quarterfinals after scoring the final shot.

== Career statistics ==
=== Club ===
As of match played on 9 May 2026

Appearances and goals by club, season and competition
Club	Season	League			National cup		Continental		Other		Total	
Club	Season	Division	Apps	Goals	Apps	Goals	Apps	Goals	Apps	Goals	Apps	Goals
Santa Fe	2007	Categoría Primera A	5	0	0	0	—		—		5	0
Santa Fe	2008	Categoría Primera A	4	0	1	0	—		c		5	0
Santa Fe	2009	Categoría Primera A	1	0	0	0	—		—		1	0
Santa Fe	2010	Categoría Primera A	7	0	0	0	—		—		7	0
Santa Fe	2011	Categoría Primera A	22	1	7	0	7	0	—		36	1
Santa Fe	2012	Categoría Primera A	42	0	5	0	—		—		47	0
Santa Fe	2013	Categoría Primera A	41	0	1	0	12	0	2	0	56	0
Santa Fe	2014	Categoría Primera A	33	1	5	0	8	0	—		46	1
Santa Fe	Total		155	2	19	0	27	0	2	0	203	2
Atlético Nacional	2015	Categoría Primera A	18	0	—		—		—		18	0
Atlético Nacional	2017	Categoría Primera A	1	0	—		—		—		1	0
Atlético Nacional	Total		19	0	—		—		—		19	0
Argentinos Juniors (loan)	2016	Argentine Primera División	6	0	—		—		—		6	0
Deportivo Cali (loan)	2016	Categoría Primera A	17	0	2	0	—		—		19	0
Deportivo Cali (loan)	2017	Categoría Primera A	20	0	0	0	2	0	—		22	0
Deportivo Cali (loan)	Total		37	0	2	0	2	0	—		41	0
Deportivo Cali (loan)	2018	Categoría Primera A	35	0	0	0	7	0	—		42	0
Deportivo Cali	2019	Categoría Primera A	21	1	—		4	0	—		25	1
Deportivo Cali	Total		56	1	0	0	11	0	—		67	1
Atlas	2019–20	Liga MX	28	0	0	0	—		—		28	0
Atlas	2020–21	Liga MX	36	0	—		—		—		36	0
Atlas	2021–22	Liga MX	46	0	—		—		—		46	0
Atlas	2022–23	Liga MX	33	0	—		3	0	2	0	38	0
Atlas	2023–24	Liga MX	34	0	—		—		3	0	37	0
Atlas	2024–25	Liga MX	33	0	—		—		3	0	36	0
Atlas	2025–26	Liga MX	33	0	—		—		2	0	35	0
Atlas	Total		242	0	0	0	3	0	10	0	255	0
Career total			518	3	21	0	43	0	12	0	594	3

=== International ===
As of match played on 7 July 2026

Appearances and goals by national team and year
National team	Year	Apps	Goals
Colombia	2014	4	0
Colombia	2015	0	0
Colombia	2016	0	0
Colombia	2017	1	0
Colombia	2018	0	0
Colombia	2019	1	0
Colombia	2020	3	0
Colombia	2021	1	0
Colombia	2022	1	0
Colombia	2023	8	0
Colombia	2024	16	0
Colombia	2025	4	0
Colombia	2026	8	0
Total		47	0

== Honours ==
Independiente Santa Fe

- Categoría Primera A: 2012-I, 2014-II
- Copa Colombia: 2009
- Superliga Colombiana: 2013

Atlético Nacional

- Categoría Primera A: 2015-II

Atlas

- Liga MX: Apertura 2021, Clausura 2022
- Campeón de Campeones: 2022

Colombia

- Copa América third place: 2021, runner-up: 2024

Individual

- Liga MX Best XI: Apertura 2021, Clausura 2022
- Liga MX Balón de Oro: 2021–22
- Liga MX Golden Glove: 2021–22
- Liga MX All-Star: 2022

== See also ==
- List of goalscoring goalkeepers
