= Juan Brunetta (footballer) =

Argentine footballer

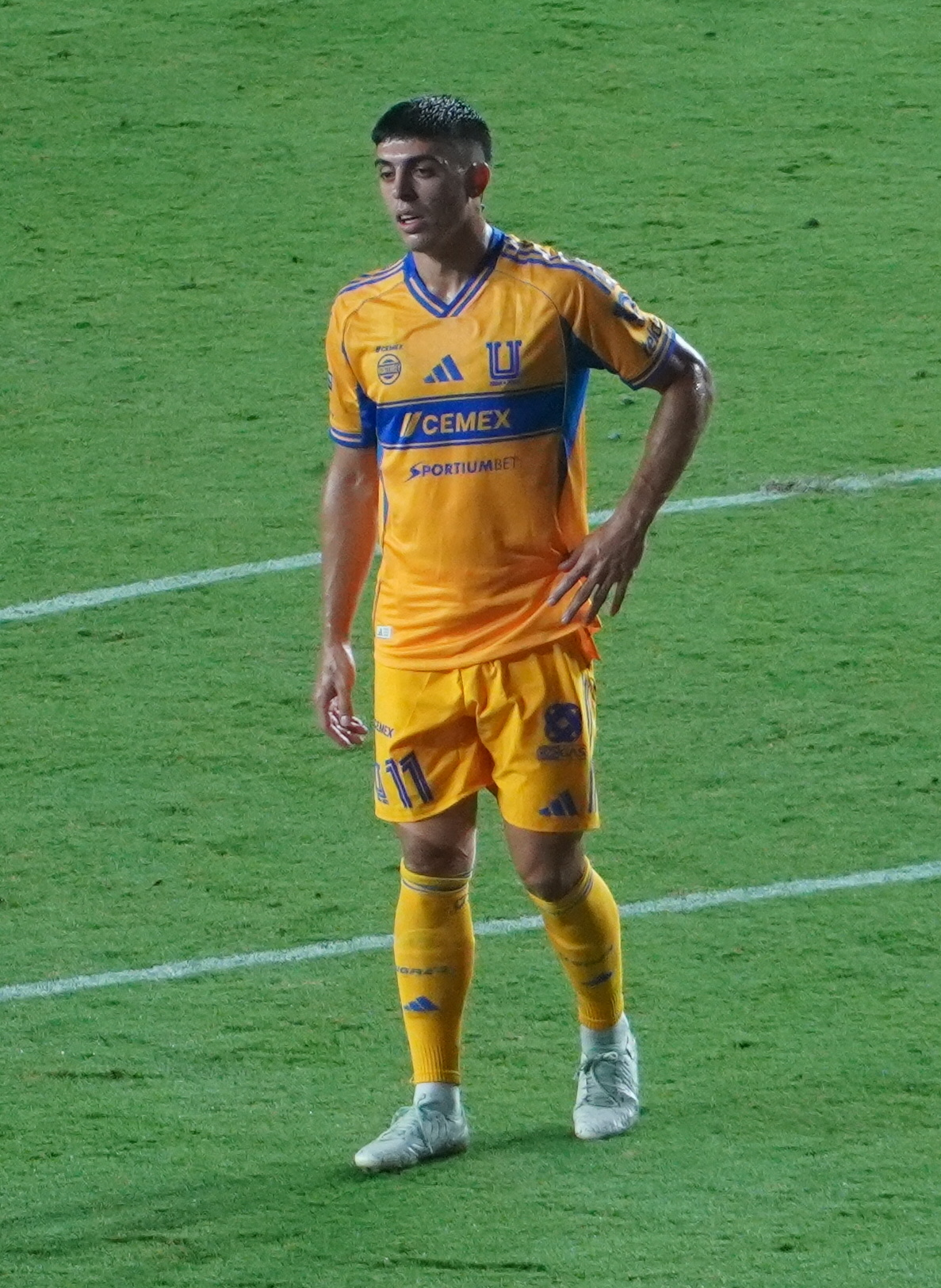
- Brunetta with Tigres UANL in 2025

Personal information
- Full name: Juan Francisco Brunetta
- Date of birth: 12 May 1997 (age 29)
- Place of birth: Laboulaye, Argentina
- Height: 1.79 m (5 ft 10 in)
- Position: Attacking midfielder

Team information
- Current team: Tigres UANL
- Number: 11

Youth career
- 2006–2009: Boca Juniors
- 2009–2012: Estudiantes
- 2012–2016: Arsenal de Sarandí

Senior career*
Years	Team	Apps	(Gls)
2016–2017	Arsenal de Sarandí	23	(4)
2017–2019	Belgrano	34	(3)
2019–2023	Godoy Cruz	19	(6)
2020–2022	→ Parma (loan)	37	(2)
2022–2023	→ Santos Laguna (loan)	16	(4)
2023	Santos Laguna	38	(15)
2024–	Tigres UANL	115	(47)

International career
2020–2021	Argentina U23	3	(0)
- * Club domestic league appearances and goals as of 21 November 2026

Juan Francisco Brunetta (born 12 May 1997) is an Argentine professional footballer who plays as an attacking midfielder for Liga MX club Tigres UANL.

== Club career ==
Brunetta began his career at Arsenal de Sarandí, where he made his professional debut in September 2016 in a match against Atlético Tucumán. In August 2017, he joined Belgrano, where he spent two seasons before transferring to Godoy Cruz following Belgrano's relegation.

In October 2020, Brunetta joined Serie A club Parma on loan. Despite Parma's relegation at the end of the season, he stayed at the club for another year. In June 2022, he was loaned to Santos Laguna in Mexico's top division. The following February, Santos reached an agreement to make the move permanent.

In December 2023, Brunetta joined Tigres UANL ahead of the Clausura 2024.

== International career ==
Brunetta was selected by Julio Olarticoechea for Argentina U20s training in July 2016.

== Career statistics ==
As of match played on 21 November 2026

Appearances and goals by club, season and competition
Club	Season	League			National cup		League cup		Continental		Other		Total	
Club	Season	Division	Apps	Goals	Apps	Goals	Apps	Goals	Apps	Goals	Apps	Goals	Apps	Goals
Arsenal de Sarandí	2016–17	Argentine Primera División	23	4	—		—		4 (Note: Appearances in the Copa Sudamericana)	2	—		27	6
Belgrano	2017–18	Argentine Primera División	13	1	3	0	—		—		—		16	1
Belgrano	2018–19	Argentine Primera División	21	2	1	1	—		—		—		22	3
Belgrano	Total		34	3	4	1	—		—		—		38	4
Godoy Cruz	2019–20	Argentine Primera División	19	6	1	0	1	0	2 (Note: Appearances in the Copa Libertadores)	0	—		23	6
Parma (loan)	2020–21	Serie A	12	1	2	2	—		—		—		14	3
Parma (loan)	2021–22	Serie B	25	1	1	1	—		—		—		26	2
Parma (loan)	Total		37	2	3	3	—		—		—		39	4
Santos Laguna (loan)	2022–23	Liga MX	16	4	4 (Note: Appearances in Copa Sky por México)	1	—		—		—		20	5
Santos Laguna	2022–23	Liga MX	20	5	—		—		—		—		20	5
Santos Laguna	2023–24	Liga MX	18	10	—		—		—		2 (Note: Appearances in Leagues Cup)	0	20	10
Santos Laguna	Total		38	15	—		—		—		2	0	40	15
Tigres UANL	2023–24	Liga MX	19	7	1 (Note: Appearance in Campeón de Campeones)	1	—		6 (Note: Appearances in CONCACAF Champions Cup)	0	—		26	8
Tigres UANL	2024–25	Liga MX	38	11	—		—		7	2	4	1	49	14
Tigres UANL	2025–26	Liga MX	42	19	—		—		9	1	4	0	55	20
Tigres UANL	2026–27	Liga MX	16	10	—		—		—		3	1	19	11
Tigres UANL	Total		115	47	1	1	—		22	3	11	2	149	53
Career total			282	81	13	6	1	0	28	5	13	2	337	94

== Honours ==
Argentina U23

- Pre-Olympic Tournament: 2020

Individual

- Liga MX Balón de Oro: 2023–24
- Liga MX Best Offensive Midfielder 2023–24
- Liga MX All-Star: 2024, 2026
- Liga MX Best XI: Clausura 2025, Apertura 2025
- Liga MX Player of the Month: November 2025
- CONCACAF Champions Cup Best XI: 2025, 2026
