= Brian García =

Mexican footballer (born 1997)

Personal information
- Full name: Brian Alberto García Carpizo
- Date of birth: 31 October 1997 (age 29)
- Place of birth: León, Guanajuato, Mexico
- Height: 1.70 m (5 ft 7 in)
- Position: Right-back

Team information
- Current team: Toluca
- Number: 17

Youth career
- 2012–2016: Querétaro
- 2018: Tijuana

Senior career*
Years	Team	Apps	(Gls)
2017–2019	Tijuana	0	(0)
2017–2018	→ Tijuana Premier (loan)	15	(0)
2020	CAFESSA Jalisco	16	(5)
2020–2021	Sonora	34	(3)
2021–2022	Necaxa	50	(1)
2023–	Toluca	79	(6)
2025–2026	→ Pachuca (loan)	36	(1)

International career^{‡}
2023–2024	Mexico	2	(0)
- * Club domestic league appearances and goals as of 23 June 2026 ‡ National team caps and goals as of 5 June 2024

Brian Alberto García Carpizo (born 31 October 1997) is a Mexican professional footballer who plays as a right-back for Liga MX club Toluca.

== International career ==
García made his debut for the senior national team on 16 December 2023, in a friendly against Colombia.

== Personal life ==
Brian's older brother, Alberto, is also a professional footballer who plays as a forward.

== Career statistics ==
=== Club ===
As of 23 June 2026

Club	Season	League			Cup		Continental		Other		Total	
Club	Season	Division	Apps	Goals	Apps	Goals	Apps	Goals	Apps	Goals	Apps	Goals
Tijuana	2018–19	Liga MX	—		2	0	—		—		2	0
CAFESSA Jalisco	2020–21	Liga Premier	16	5	—		—		—		16	5
Sonora	2020–21	Liga de Expansión MX	34	3	—		—		—		34	3
Necaxa	2021–22	Liga MX	32	0	—		—		—		32	0
Necaxa	2022–23	Liga MX	18	1	—		—		—		18	1
Necaxa	Total		50	1	—		—		—		50	1
Toluca	2022–23	Liga MX	18	2	—		—		—		18	2
Toluca	2023–24	Liga MX	35	3	—		—		4 (Note: Appearances in Leagues Cup)	0	39	3
Toluca	2024–25	Liga MX	26	1	—		—		3	0	29	1
Toluca	Total		79	6	—		—		7	0	57	5
Pachuca (loan)	2025–26	Liga MX	36	1	—		—		3	0	39	1
Career total			215	16	2	0	0	0	10	0	227	16

=== International ===
As of match played 5 June 2024

Appearances and goals by national team and year
National team	Year	Apps	Goals
Mexico	2023	1	0
Mexico	2024	1	0
Total		2	0

== Honours ==
Toluca

- Liga MX: Clausura 2025
- Leagues Cup: 2026

Individual

- Liga MX All-Star: 2024
