= Jesús Garza =

Mexican footballer (born 2000)

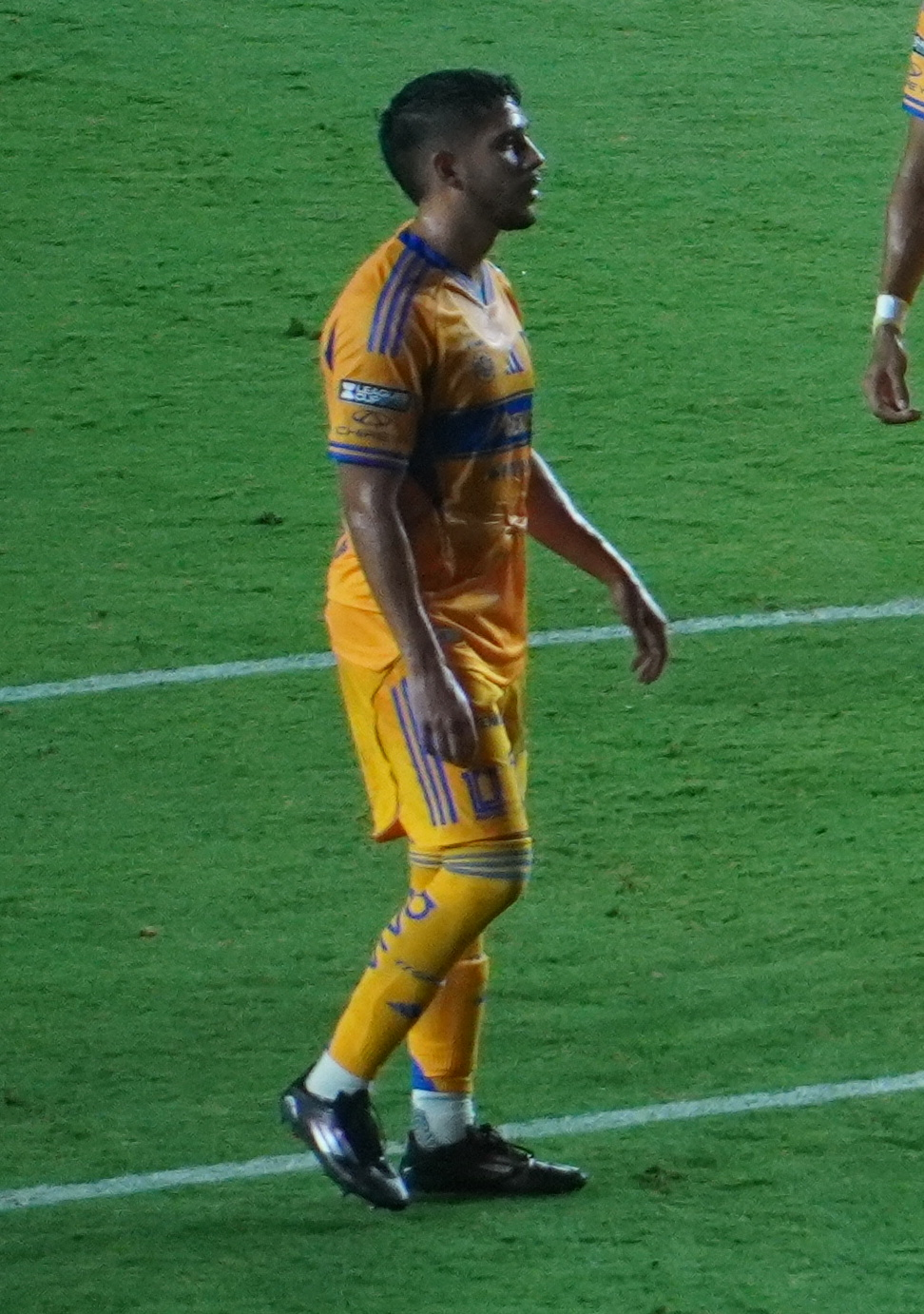
- Garza with Tigres UANL in 2025

Personal information
- Full name: Jesús Ángel Garza García
- Date of birth: 6 June 2000 (age 26)
- Place of birth: Monterrey, Nuevo León, Mexico
- Height: 1.67 m (5 ft 6 in)
- Position: Defender

Team information
- Current team: Tigres UANL
- Number: 14

Youth career
- 2018–2022: Tigres UANL

Senior career*
Years	Team	Apps	(Gls)
2021–	Tigres UANL	129	(2)

International career^{‡}
2023	Mexico U23	3	(0)
2026–	Mexico	1	(0)
Medal record
Men's football
Representing Mexico
Pan American Games
Bronze medal – third place	2023 Santiago	Team
- * Club domestic league appearances and goals as of 21 November 2026 ‡ National team caps and goals as of 25 February 2026

Jesús Ángel Garza García (born 6 June 2000) is a Mexican professional footballer who plays as a defender for Liga MX club Tigres UANL and the Mexico national team.

== Career statistics ==
=== Club ===
As of match played on 21 November 2026

Club	Season	League			Cup		Continental		Other		Total	
Club	Season	Division	Apps	Goals	Apps	Goals	Apps	Goals	Apps	Goals	Apps	Goals
Tigres UANL	2021–22	Liga MX	6	0	—		—		—		6	0
Tigres UANL	2022–23	Liga MX	30	0	3 (Note: One appearance in Campeón de Campeones and two appeareances in Copa Sky por México)	0	4 (Note: Appearances in CONCACAF Champions Cup)	0	—		37	0
Tigres UANL	2023–24	Liga MX	17	0	1 (Note: Appearance in Campeón de Campeones)	0	4	0	1 (Note: Appearance in Leagues Cup)	0	23	0
Tigres UANL	2024–25	Liga MX	25	2	—		4	0	1	0	30	2
Tigres UANL	2025–26	Liga MX	36	0	—		8	0	4	0	48	0
Tigres UANL	2026–27	Liga MX	15	0	—		—		3	0	18	0
Career total			129	2	4	0	20	0	9	0	162	2

=== International ===
As of match played on 25 February 2026

Appearances and goals by national team and year
National team	Year	Apps	Goals
Mexico	2026	1	0
Total		1	0

== Honours ==
Tigres UANL

- Liga MX: Clausura 2023
- Campeón de Campeones: 2023
- Campeones Cup: 2023

Mexico U23

- Pan American Bronze Medal: 2023

Individual

- Liga MX All-Star: 2026
