= Alan Vega (footballer) =

Mexican footballer (born 2000)

Personal information
- Full name: Jesús Alan Vega Grijalva
- Date of birth: 18 March 2000 (age 26)
- Place of birth: Hermosillo, Sonora, Mexico
- Height: 1.73 m (5 ft 8 in)
- Position: Full-back

Team information
- Current team: Tijuana
- Number: 16

Youth career
- 2016–2021: Tijuana
- 2024: → Querétaro (loan)

Senior career*
Years	Team	Apps	(Gls)
2021–	Tijuana	68	(2)
2021–2023	→ Sinaloa (loan)	57	(5)
- * Club domestic league appearances and goals as of 20 November 2026

Jesús Alan Vega Grijalva (born 18 March 2000) is a Mexican professional footballer who plays as an full-back for Liga MX club Tijuana.

== Club career ==
Vega began his career at the academy of Tijuana, where he progressed through all of their youth categories before being loaned to Sinaloa on 15 June 2021. On 28 July, he made his professional debut in a 1–1 draw with Tlaxcala, where he played the full match.

After two years with Sinaloa, Vega returned to Tijuana, where he made his Liga MX debut on 3 July 2023, in a 2–3 loss to UNAM and on December, he was loaned to Querétaro, but only played in their U23 team, before returning to Tijuana.

== Career statistics ==
=== Club ===
As of match played on 20 November 2026

Appearances and goals by club, season and competition
Club	Season	League			Cup		Continental		Club World Cup		Other		Total	
Club	Season	Division	Apps	Goals	Apps	Goals	Apps	Goals	Apps	Goals	Apps	Goals	Apps	Goals
Tijuana	2023–24	Liga MX	8	0	—		—		—		1 (Note: Appearances in Leagues Cup)	0	9	0
Tijuana	2024–25	Liga MX	15	2	—		—		—		1	0	16	2
Tijuana	2025–26	Liga MX	30	0	—		—		—		2	0	32	0
Tijuana	2026–27	Liga MX	15	0	—		—		—		3	0	18	0
Tijuana	Total		68	2	—		—		—		7	0	75	2
Sinaloa (loan)	2021–22	Liga de Expansión MX	34	2	—		—		—		—		34	2
Sinaloa (loan)	2022–23	Liga de Expansión MX	23	3	—		—		—		—		23	3
Sinaloa (loan)	Total		57	5	—		—		—		—		57	5
Career total			125	7	0	0	0	0	0	0	7	0	132	7
