= Albert Espigares =

Spanish football manager

Personal information
- Full name: Alberto Manuel Espigares López
- Date of birth: 8 May 1978 (age 48)
- Place of birth: Barcelona, Catalonia
- Height: 1.90 m (6 ft 3 in)

Managerial career
- Years: Team
- 2026: Puebla

Alberto Manuel Espigares López, better known as Albert Espigares, (born 8 May 1978) is a Spanish football manager, who recently managed Liga MX team Puebla.

== Career ==
Espigares did not have a career as a professional football player, dedicating himself mainly to the training of youth footballers in the academies of RCD Espanyol and Real Madrid CF.

At the end of 2010, Espigares made the leap to Mexican football, being hired as director of the technical improvement area of Santos Laguna. After being promoted to head of the club's youth academy, he remained in the position until 2017.

In June 2017, Espigares was appointed as head of the youth academy of Atlas F.C. He remained in the position until December 2023, when he was sacked by the club following a restructuring.

In February 2024, Espigares was appointed head of the youth academy of Club Puebla.

On November 20, 2025, Espigares was appointed as manager of Puebla, replacing Hernán Cristante, marking the first time he held the top position as head coach of a club. Espigares' appointment was due to a new policy focused on developing homegrown players in response to the team's financial difficulties.

Espigares debuted as manager on January 9, 2026, in the match Puebla was defeated by Atlas with a score of 1–0.

On May 4, 2026, he was sacked from his position due to poor results.

== Managerial statistics ==
As of match played 24 April 2026

Managerial record by team and tenure
Team	From	To	Record				
Team	From	To	P	W	D	L	Win %
Puebla	20 November 2025	4 May 2026	17	3	4	10	17.65
Total			17	3	4	10	17.65
