= Diego Barbosa =

Mexican footballer (born 1996)

Personal information
- Full name: Diego Armando Barbosa Zaragoza
- Date of birth: 25 September 1996 (age 30)
- Place of birth: Guadalajara, Jalisco, Mexico
- Height: 1.73 m (5 ft 8 in)
- Position: Right-back

Team information
- Current team: Toluca
- Number: 2

Youth career
- 2011–2015: Atlas

Senior career*
| Years | Team | Apps | (Gls) |
| 2015–2023 | Atlas | 94 | (4) |
| 2016 | → Venados (loan) | 9 | (0) |
| 2018–2019 | → Dorados (loan) | 30 | (1) |
| 2023–2024 | Tijuana | 34 | (0) |
| 2025– | Toluca | 21 | (1) |
- * Club domestic league appearances and goals as of 1 December 2024

Diego Armando Barbosa Zaragoza (born 25 September 1996) is a Mexican professional footballer who plays as a right-back for Liga MX club Toluca.

== Career statistics ==
=== Club ===
As of 10 March 2024

| Club | Season | League | | | Cup | | Continental | | Other | | Total | |
| Club | Season | Division | Apps | Goals | Apps | Goals | Apps | Goals | Apps | Goals | Apps | Goals |
|---|---|---|---|---|---|---|---|---|---|---|---|---|
| Atlas | 2016–17 | Liga MX | – | | 2 | 0 | – | | – | | 2 | 0 |
| Atlas | 2019–20 | Liga MX | 8 | 1 | 2 | 0 | – | | – | | 10 | 1 |
| Atlas | 2020–21 | Liga MX | 24 | 0 | – | | – | | – | | 24 | 0 |
| Atlas | 2021–22 | Liga MX | 34 | 3 | – | | – | | 1 (Note: Appearance in Supercopa de la Liga MX) | 0 | 35 | 3 |
| Atlas | 2022–23 | Liga MX | 28 | 0 | – | | 4 (Note: Appearances in CONCACAF Champions League) | 0 | 1 (Note: Appearance in Campeones Cup) | 0 | 33 | 0 |
| Atlas | Total | | 94 | 4 | 4 | 0 | 4 | 0 | 2 | 0 | 104 | 4 |
| Venados (loan) | 2015–16 | Ascenso MX | 9 | 0 | 4 | 0 | – | | – | | 13 | 0 |
| Dorados (loan) | 2018–19 | Ascenso MX | 30 | 1 | 4 | 0 | – | | – | | 34 | 1 |
| Tijuana | 2023–24 | Liga MX | 27 | 0 | – | | – | | 2 (Note: Appearances in Leagues Cup) | 0 | 29 | 0 |
| Tijuana | 2024–25 | Liga MX | 7 | 0 | – | | – | | – | | 7 | 0 |
| Tijuana | Total | | 34 | 0 | – | | – | | 2 | 0 | 36 | 0 |
| Career total | | | 167 | 5 | 12 | 0 | 4 | 0 | 4 | 0 | 187 | 5 |

== Honours ==
Atlas

- Liga MX: Apertura 2021, Clausura 2022
- Campeón de Campeones: 2022

Toluca

- Liga MX: Clausura 2025, Apertura 2025
- Campeón de Campeones: 2025
- Campeones Cup : 2025
- CONCACAF Champions Cup: 2026
- Leagues Cup: 2026

Individual

- Liga MX Best XI: Apertura 2021
- Liga MX All-Star: 2022
