= Juan Pablo Domínguez =

Mexican footballer (born 1998)

Personal information
- Full name: Juan Pablo Domínguez Chonteco
- Date of birth: 30 October 1998 (age 28)
- Place of birth: Ecatepec de Morelos, Mexico
- Height: 1.68 m (5 ft 6 in)
- Position: Winger

Team information
- Current team: León (on loan from Toluca)
- Number: 8

Youth career
- 2018–2019: Guadalajara
- 2019–2021: Irapuato
- 2021–2022: Atlante

Senior career*
Years	Team	Apps	(Gls)
2021–2023	Atlante	59	(10)
2023	→ Necaxa (loan)	15	(0)
2023–	Toluca	83	(10)
2026–	→ León (loan)	25	(2)
- * Club domestic league appearances and goals as of 21 November 2026

Juan Pablo Domínguez Chonteco (born 30 October 1998) is a Mexican professional footballer who plays as a winger for Liga MX club León, on loan from Toluca.

== Career statistics ==
=== Club ===
As of match played on 21 November 2026

Club	Season	League			Cup		Continental		Other		Total	
Club	Season	Division	Apps	Goals	Apps	Goals	Apps	Goals	Apps	Goals	Apps	Goals
Atlante	2021–22	Liga de Expansión MX	37	5	—		—		—		37	5
Atlante	2022–23	Liga de Expansión MX	22	5	—		—		—		22	5
Atlante	Total		59	10	—		—		—		59	10
Necaxa (loan)	2022–23	Liga MX	15	0	4 (Note: Appearances in Copa Sky por México)	0	—		—		19	0
Toluca	2023–24	Liga MX	31	8	—		—		4 (Note: Appearances in Leagues Cup)	1	35	9
Toluca	2024–25	Liga MX	35	1	1 (Note: Appearance in Campeón de Campeones)	0	—		4	0	40	1
Toluca	2025–26	Liga MX	17	1	—		—		5 (Note: Four appearances in Leagues Cup and one in Campeones Cup)	0	22	1
Toluca	Total		83	10	1	0	—		13	1	97	11
León (loan)	2025–26	Liga MX	15	1	—		—		—		15	1
León (loan)	2026–27	Liga MX	10	1	—		—		5	1	15	2
León (loan)	Total		25	2	—		—		5	1	30	3
Career total			182	22	5	0	0	0	18	2	205	24

== Honours ==
Toluca

- Liga MX: Clausura 2025, Apertura 2025
- Campeón de Campeones: 2025
- Campeones Cup : 2025
