= Franco Romero (footballer, born 2000) =

Argentine footballer

Personal information
- Full name: Franco Agustín Romero
- Date of birth: 23 April 2000 (age 26)
- Place of birth: La Plata, Argentina
- Height: 1.78 m (5 ft 10 in)
- Position: Central midfielder

Team information
- Current team: Toluca
- Number: 5

Youth career
- Inter de Villa Elvira
- 2005–2020: Estudiantes

Senior career*
Years	Team	Apps	(Gls)
2020–2024	Estudiantes	4	(0)
2022	→ Agropecuario (loan)	4	(0)
2023	→ Independiente Rivadavia (loan)	34	(0)
2024	Defensa y Justicia	6	(0)
2024	→ Independiente Rivadavia (loan)	27	(2)
2025–	Toluca	19	(0)
- * Club domestic league appearances and goals as of 21:29, 2 February 2025 (UTC)

Franco Agustín Romero (born 23 April 2000) is an Argentine professional footballer who plays as a central midfielder for Liga MX club Toluca.

== Career ==
Romero joined the youth system of Estudiantes in 2005, following a short spell with Inter de Villa Elvira. After fifteen years in their academy, the central midfielder was moved into the club's first-team in 2020–21 under caretaker manager Leandro Desábato. Romero was on the bench in early November for Copa de la Liga Profesional defeats to San Lorenzo and Argentinos Juniors, which preceded his senior debut arriving later that month in the same competition against Aldosivi; he was substituted on in place of Iván Gómez midway through the second half of a home defeat.

== Career statistics ==
As of 23 November 2020.

Appearances and goals by club, season and competition
Club	Season	League			Cup		League Cup		Continental		Other		Total	
Club	Season	Division	Apps	Goals	Apps	Goals	Apps	Goals	Apps	Goals	Apps	Goals	Apps	Goals
Estudiantes	2020–21 (Note: Soccerway counts Copa de la Liga Profesional appearances as league appearances.)	Primera División	1	0	0	0	0	0	—		0	0	1	0
Career total			1	0	0	0	0	0	—		0	0	1	0

== Honours ==
Independiente Rivadavia

- Primera Nacional: 2023

Toluca

- Liga MX: Clausura 2025, Apertura 2025
- Campeón de Campeones: 2025
- Campeones Cup : 2025
- CONCACAF Champions Cup: 2026
- Leagues Cup: 2026

Individual

- Liga MX All-Star: 2026
