= 2018–19 Santos Laguna season =

Santos Laguna
2018–19 season
- Owner: Orlegi Deportes
- Chairman: Alejandro Irraragori
- Manager: Salvador Reyes Jr.
- Stadium: Estadio Corona
- Apertura: 4th Playoffs: Quarterfinals
- Clausura: 6th
- Apertura Copa MX: Group stage
- CONCACAF Champions League: Round of 16
- Top goalscorer: League: Julio Furch (14 goals); All: Julio Furch (16 goals)
- Highest home attendance: 28,479 (vs América, 11 November 2018)
- Lowest home attendance: 10,879 (vs Celaya, 7 August 2018)
- Average home league attendance: 23,715
- Biggest win: Santos Laguna 6–2 Marathón (20 February 2019)
- Biggest defeat: Santos Laguna 0–2 Monterrey (1 December 2018)
Home colours	Away colours
- All statistics correct as of 14 January 2019.

The 2018–19 Santos Laguna season is the 36st season in the football club's history and the 31st consecutive season in the top flight of Mexican football. In addition to the Liga MX and Copa MX, the club will also compete in the CONCACAF Champions League.

== Coaching staff ==
Position	Name
Head coach	(Mexico) Salvador Reyes
Assistant coaches	(Mexico) Juan Pablo Rodríguez
Assistant coaches	(Mexico) Rafael Figueroa
Assistant coaches	(Mexico) Rubén Duarte
Goalkeepers coach	(Mexico) Nicolás Navarro
Fitness coach	(Argentina) Luis Canay
Kinesiologist	(Argentina) Pablo Barrionuevo
Masseur	(Mexico) Carlos Martín del Campo
Doctors	(Mexico) Carlos Villatoro
Doctors	(Mexico) Carlos Gómez

== Players ==
=== Squad information ===
No.	Pos.	Nat.	Name	Date of birth (age)	Signed in	Previous club
Goalkeepers
1	GK	(Mexico)	Jonathan Orozco	12 May 1986 (age 40)	2017 (Winter)	(Mexico) Monterrey
28	GK	(Mexico)	Carlos Acevedo	19 April 1996 (age 30)	2016	(Mexico) Youth System
292	GK	(Mexico)	Joel García	12 April 1998 (age 28)	2018	(Mexico) Youth System
Defenders
2	DF	(Mexico)	José Abella	10 February 1994 (age 32)	2013	(Mexico) Youth System
3	DF	(Uruguay)	Gerardo Alcoba	25 November 1984 (age 41)	2018 (Winter)	(Mexico) UNAM
4	DF	(Mexico)	Jesús Angulo	30 January 1998 (age 28)	2017	(Mexico) Youth System
5	DF	(Argentina)	Hugo Nervo	6 January 1991 (age 35)	2018	(Argentina) Huracán
17	DF	(Mexico)	Gerardo Arteaga	7 September 1997 (age 29)	2016	(Mexico) Youth System
20	DF	(Mexico)	Alejandro Castro	27 March 1987 (age 39)	2018	(Mexico) Atlético San Luis
21	DF	(Brazil)	Dória	8 November 1994 (age 32)	2018	(Turkey) Yeni Malatyaspor
Midfielders
6	MF	(Mexico)	Diego de Buen	3 July 1991 (age 35)	2016 (Winter)	(Mexico) Tijuana
7	MF	(Mexico)	Jesús Isijara	26 November 1989 (age 36)	2018 (Winter)	(Mexico) Necaxa
8	MF	(Mexico)	Carlos Orrantia	1 February 1991 (age 35)	2018	(Mexico) América
10	MF	(Paraguay)	Osvaldo Martínez	8 April 1986 (age 40)	2017 (Winter)	(Mexico) América
15	MF	(Uruguay)	Brian Lozano	23 February 1994 (age 32)	2017	(Mexico) América
16	MF	(Mexico)	Ulises Rivas	25 January 1996 (age 30)	2014	(Mexico) Youth System
22	MF	(Colombia)	Deinner Quiñones	16 August 1995 (age 31)	2014	(Colombia) Independiente Medellín
23	MF	(Mexico)	José Juan Vázquez	14 March 1988 (age 38)	2018 (Winter)	(Mexico) Guadalajara
27	MF	(Mexico)	Javier Cortés	20 July 1989 (age 37)	2017	(Mexico) UNAM
Forwards
9	FW	(Argentina)	Julio Furch	29 July 1989 (age 37)	2017 (Winter)	(Mexico) Veracruz
11	FW	(Mexico)	Eduardo Herrera	25 July 1988 (age 38)	2018	(Mexico) Veracruz
12	FW	(Colombia)	Edwuin Cetré	1 January 1998 (age 28)	2018 (Winter)	(Mexico) Youth System
13	FW	(Uruguay)	Jonathan Rodríguez	6 July 1993 (age 33)	2016	(Spain) Deportivo La Coruña
18	FW	(Ecuador)	Ayrton Preciado	17 July 1994 (age 32)	2018	(Ecuador) Emelec

Players and squad numbers last updated on 3 December 2018.
Note: Flags indicate national team as has been defined under FIFA eligibility rules. Players may hold more than one non-FIFA nationality.

== Transfers ==
=== In ===
N	Pos.	Nat.	Name	Age	Moving from	Type	Transfer window	Source
5	DF	(Argentina)	Hugo Nervo	35	(Argentina) Huracán	Transfer	Summer	
8	MF	(Mexico)	Carlos Orrantia	35	América	End of Loan	Summer	
11	FW	(Mexico)	Eduardo Herrera	38	(Scotland) Rangers	Loan	Summer	
15	MF	(Uruguay)	Brian Lozano	32	América	Transfer	Summer	
18	FW	(Ecuador)	Ayrton Preciado	32	(Ecuador) Emelec	Transfer	Summer	
20	MF	(Mexico)	Alejandro Castro	39	UNAM	Loan	Summer	
21	DF	(Brazil)	Dória	32	(France) Marseille	Transfer	Summer	
22	MF	(Colombia)	Deinner Quiñones	31	(Colombia) Independiente Medellín	Loan	Summer	

=== Out ===
N	Pos.	Nat.	Name	Age	Moving to	Type	Transfer window	Source
4	DF	(Mexico)	Jorge Sánchez	28	América	Transfer	Summer	
5	DF	(Mexico)	Óscar Bernal	31	(Colombia) La Equidad	Loan	Summer	
11	MF	(Mexico)	Ulises Dávila	35	Unattached	Released	Summer	
14	DF	(Mexico)	Néstor Araujo	35	(Spain) Celta	Transfer	Summer	
18	MF	(Mexico)	David Andrade	33	Tampico Madero	Transfer	Summer	
19	DF	(United States)	Jorge Villafaña	37	(United States) Portland Timbers	Transfer	Summer	
20	MF	(Chile)	Bryan Rabello	32	BUAP	Loan	Summer	
21	FW	(Cape Verde)	Djaniny	35	(Saudi Arabia) Al-Ahli	Transfer	Summer	ESPN
24	DF	(Argentina)	Carlos Izquierdoz	38	(Argentina) Boca Juniors	Transfer	Summer	
301	MF	(Colombia)	Santiago Martínez	28	Tampico Madero	Loan	Summer	

== Competitions ==
=== Overview ===
Competition	First match	Last match	Starting round	Final position	Record							
Competition	First match	Last match	Starting round	Final position	Pld	W	D	L	GF	GA	GD	Win %
Campeón de Campeones	15 July 2018		Final	Runners-up	1	0	0	1	0	4	−4	0.00
Torneo Apertura	22 July 2018	1 December 2018	Matchday 1	4th (Quarterfinals)	19	8	6	5	27	21	+6	42.11
Apertura Copa MX	31 July 2018	29 August 2018	Group stage	Group stage	4	0	2	2	1	5	−4	0.00
Torneo Clausura	6 January 2019		Matchday 1		9	4	2	3	11	10	+1	44.44
CONCACAF Champions League	20 February 2019		Round of 16		2	2	0	0	11	2	+9	100.00
Total					35	14	10	11	50	42	+8	40.00

Last updated: 2 March 2019
Source: Mediotiempo.com

=== Torneo Apertura ===
==== League table ====
Pos	Team	Pld	W	D	L	GF	GA	GD	Pts	Qualification or relegation
2	América (C)	17	9	6	2	33	17	+16	33	Advance to Liguilla (Note: The first 8 places in the table qualified for the Liguilla. The last ranked team in the relegation table could qualify for the Liguilla in the Apertura tournament.)
3	Pumas	17	8	6	3	29	19	+10	30	Advance to Liguilla
4	Santos Laguna	17	8	6	3	27	18	+9	30	Advance to Liguilla
5	Monterrey	17	9	3	5	25	19	+6	30	Advance to Liguilla
6	Tigres	17	8	5	4	32	18	+14	29	Advance to Liguilla

Source: Liga MX
Rules for classification: 1) Points; 2) Goal difference; 3) Number of goals scored; 4) Head-to-head results between tied teams; 5) Number of goals scored away; 6) Highest relegation coefficient; 7) Fair Play points
(C) Champions

==== Results summary ====
Overall								Home						Away					
Pld	W	D	L	GF	GA	GD	Pts	W	D	L	GF	GA	GD	W	D	L	GF	GA	GD
17	8	6	3	27	18	+9	30	6	3	0	17	6	+11	2	3	3	10	12	−2

Last updated: 8 December 2018.
Source: LigaMX

==== Result round by round ====
Round	1	2	3	4	5	6	7	8	9	10	11	12	13	14	15	16	17
Ground	H	A	H	A	H	A	H	A	H	H	A	H	A	H	A	H	A
Result	W	L	W	W	W	D	D	L	W	D	W	W	D	W	L	D	D
Position	6	12	6	4	2	3	3	5	4	5	3	3	3	2	3	4	4

Updated to match(es) played on 8 December 2018. Source: LigaMX
A = Away; H = Home; W = Win; D = Draw; L = Loss

==== Matches ====
22 July 2018 1	Santos Laguna	2–1	BUAP	Torreón
18:00	Lozano 47'; Abella (yellow card) 49'; Lozano (yellow card) 54'; J. Rodríguez 57'	Report	8' Rabello; (yellow card) 36' M. Laínez	Stadium: Corona; Attendance: 22,830; Referee: Oscar Mejía García

27 July 2018 2	Morelia	3–1	Santos Laguna	Morelia
19:00	Sandoval (yellow card) 21'; Sandoval 51'; Valdés 79' (pen.); Millar (yellow card) 83'; Sansores 88' (pen.)	Report	(yellow card) 41' Angulo; (yellow card) 80' Nervo; 90+1' Furch	Stadium: Morelos; Attendance: 20,258; Referee: Fernando Guerrero

6 August 2018 3	Santos Laguna	2–0	Puebla	Torreón
18:30	Furch 33'; Orrantia 50'	Report		Stadium: Corona; Referee: Francisco Chacón

12 August 2018 4	Guadalajara	1–2	Santos Laguna	Zapopan
21:00	Brizuela 26'; Van Rankin (yellow card) 40'; Brizuela (yellow card) 60'	Report	(yellow card) 35' Martínez; 40' Dória; (yellow card) 51' Nervo; 78' J. Rodríguez	Stadium: Akron; Attendance: 26,913; Referee: Marco Antonio Ortiz

19 August 2018 5	Santos Laguna	3–1	UANL	Torreón
18:00	Furch 33'; J. Rodríguez 58', 65'	Report	Vargas 52'	Stadium: Corona; Attendance: 24,741; Referee: Jorge Antonio Pérez Durán

22 August 2018 6	Tijuana	2–2	Santos Laguna	Tijuana
21:06	D. González 69'; Bolaños (yellow card) 73'; E. Castillo 87'; E. Castillo (yellow card) 88'	Report	(yellow card) 28' Abella; 48' Lozano; 90' Furch	Stadium: Caliente; Attendance: 26,333; Referee: Oscar Mejía García

26 August 2018 7	Santos Laguna	1–1	Cruz Azul	Torreón
18:00 CDT	Angulo (yellow card) 39'; Quiñones 85'	Liga MX; Referee Report	Aguilar (yellow card) 62'; Cauteruccio 76'; Corona (yellow card) 90+4'	Stadium: Corona; Attendance: 28,460; Referee: Óscar Macías Romo

2 September 2018 8	Toluca	2–1	Santos Laguna	Toluca
12:00	da Silva 13'; Sambueza 61'	Report	Furch 3'	Stadium: Nemesio Díez; Attendance: 15,621; Referee: Marco Antonio Ortiz Nava

16 August 2018 9	Santos Laguna	3–0	León	Torreón
18:00 CDT	Lozano (yellow card) 26'; J. Rodríguez 37'; Furch 63'; Arteaga (yellow card) 85'; Furch 86' (pen.)	Report	(yellow card) 65' Tesillo; (yellow card) 85' Mejía	Stadium: Corona; Attendance: 21,514; Referee: Fernando Guerrero

23 September 2018 10	Santos Laguna	1–1	Veracruz	Torreón
18:00 CDT	Angulo (yellow card) 20'; Martínez (yellow card) 42'; J. Rodríguez 47'; Abella (yellow card) 89'	Report	(yellow card) 18' Cartagena; (yellow card) 27' Prieto; (yellow card) 49' Noya; 71' Menéndez; (yellow card) 77' Rivas	Stadium: Corona; Attendance: 22,043; Referee: Eduardo Galván Basulto

29 September 2018 11	Necaxa	0–1	Santos Laguna	Aguascalientes
21:00	B. Fernández (yellow card) 48'; Peña (yellow card) 63'	Report	23' Furch; (yellow card) 79' Vázquez; (yellow card) 90+3' Arteaga	Stadium: Estadio Victoria; Attendance: 15,542; Referee: Roberto García Orozco

5 October 2018 12	Santos Laguna	3–1	Atlas	Torreón
19:00	Furch 17'; Martínez 47'; Rodríguez 56'	Report	González 49'	Stadium: Corona; Attendance: 20,854; Referee: Jorge Antonio Pérez Durán

20 September 2018 13	Pachuca	1–1	Santos Laguna	Pachuca
19:00	Guzmán 3'; A. Blanco (yellow card) 80'	Report	85' Furch; (yellow card) 88' Nervo	Stadium: Hidalgo; Attendance: 18,248; Referee: Jorge Isaac Rojas

26 October 2018 14	Santos Laguna	1–0	Monterrey	Torreón
19:00	Furch 16'	Report		Stadium: Corona; Attendance: 22,887; Referee: César Arturo Ramos

4 November 2018 15	Querétaro	2–1	Santos Laguna	Querétaro City
16:00	Pérez 17'; Villalva 61'	Report	Dória (yellow card) 70'; Rodríguez 88'	Stadium: Estadio Corregidora; Referee: Fernando Guerrero Ramírez

11 November 2018 16	Santos Laguna	1–1	América	Torreón
19:00	José Abella (yellow card) 14' (yellow-red card) 90'; Furch 16'	Report	Luis Reyes (yellow card) 39'; Bruno Valdez 61'	Stadium: Corona; Referee: Luis Enrique Santander Aguirre

25 November 2018 17	UNAM	1–1	Santos Laguna	Mexico City
12:00 CST	Dória 62' (o.g.)	Report	Rodríguez 24'	Stadium: Olímpico Universitario; Attendance: 27,950; Referee: Jorge Antonio Pérez Durán

===== Quarter-finals =====
28 November 2018 First leg	Monterrey	1–0	Santos Laguna	Guadalupe
21:06	Funes Mori 59'	Report		Stadium: BBVA Bancomer; Attendance: 24,723; Referee: Luis Enrique Santander

1 December 2018 Second leg	Santos Laguna	0–2 (0–3 agg.)	Monterrey	Torreón
21:00		Report	Sánchez 53'; Funes Mori 58'	Stadium: Corona; Attendance: 25,900; Referee: Jorge Isaac Rojas

=== Apertura Copa MX ===
==== Group stage ====
Pos	Team	Pld	W	D	L	GF	GA	GD	Pts	Qualification
1	Pachuca	4	3	1	0	6	0	+6	10	Advance to knockout stage
2	Celaya	4	1	1	2	3	5	−2	4	
3	Santos Laguna	4	0	2	2	1	5	−4	2	

Source: Copa MX
Rules for classification: Tiebreakers

31 July 2018 1	Pachuca	2–0	Santos Laguna	Pachuca
21:00	Pérez 38'; Jara 41'	Report		Stadium: Hidalgo; Attendance: 14,792; Referee: Edgar Ulises Rangel

7 August 2018 2	Santos Laguna	1–1	Celaya	Torreón
19:00	Preciado 12'	Report	López 56'	Stadium: Corona; Attendance: 10,879; Referee: Roberto Ríos Jácome

15 August 2018 3	Celaya	2–0	Santos Laguna	Celaya
19:00	Silva 46'; Reyna 90+1'	Report		Stadium: Miguel Alemán Valdés; Attendance: 4,360; Referee: Mario Humberto Vargas

29 August 2018 4	Santos Laguna	0–0	Pachuca	Torreón
19:00		Report		Stadium: Corona; Attendance: 13,453; Referee: José Alfredo Peñaloza

=== Torneo Clausura ===
==== League table ====
Pos	Team	Pld	W	D	L	GF	GA	GD	Pts
9	Toluca	17	7	4	6	28	23	+5	25
10	Puebla	17	6	6	5	18	21	−3	24
11	Santos Laguna	17	6	4	7	21	23	−2	22
12	BUAP	17	6	2	9	17	34	−17	20
13	Atlas	17	6	1	10	19	28	−9	19

Source: Liga MX
Rules for classification: 1) Points; 2) Goal difference; 3) Number of goals scored; 4) Head-to-head results between tied teams; 5) Number of goals scored away; 6) Highest relegation coefficient; 7) Fair Play points

==== Results summary ====
Overall								Home						Away					
Pld	W	D	L	GF	GA	GD	Pts	W	D	L	GF	GA	GD	W	D	L	GF	GA	GD
8	4	2	2	11	7	+4	14	3	1	0	7	1	+6	1	1	2	4	6	−2

Last updated: 24 February 2019.
Source: LigaMX

==== Result round by round ====
Round	1	2	3	4	5	6	7	8	9	10	11	12	13	14	15	16	17
Ground	A	H	A	H	A	H	A	H	A	A	H	A	H	A	H	A	H
Result	L	W	D	W	L	D	W	W									
Position	17	9	10	7	9	9	6	5									

Updated to match(es) played on 24 February 2019. Source: LigaMX
A = Away; H = Home; W = Win; D = Draw; L = Loss

==== Matches ====
6 January 2019 1	BUAP	2–0	Santos Laguna	Puebla
16:00	Ramos 56'; Yago César 65'; Lainez (yellow card) 90+2'	Report	(yellow card) 63' Garnica; (yellow card) 90+2' Vázquez	Stadium: Universitario BUAP; Attendance: 6,350; Referee: Mario Humberto Vargas

13 January 2019 2	Santos Laguna	1–0	Morelia	Torreón
18:00	Angulo (yellow card) 30'; Correa (yellow card) 37'; Valdés (yellow card) 38'; Furch 59'	Report	(yellow card) 40' Millar; (yellow card) 90+3' Achilier	Stadium: Corona; Attendance: 22,585; Referee: Adonai Escobedo

18 January 2018 3	Puebla	1–1	Santos Laguna	Puebla
21:05	González 20'; Cavallini (yellow card) 45+6'; González (yellow card) 90+5'	Report	26' Correa; (penalty missed) Furch	Stadium: Cuauhtémoc; Attendance: 14,050; Referee: Fernando Hernández Gómez

27 January 2019 4	Santos Laguna	1–0	Guadalajara	Torreón
18:00	Furch (yellow card) 16'; Vázquez 19'; Dória (yellow card) 58'; Valdés (yellow card) 86'	Report	(yellow card) 71' Molina	Stadium: Corona; Attendance: 27,919; Referee: Luis Enrique Santander

2 February 2019 5	UANL	2–1	Santos Laguna	San Nicolás
19:00 CST	Valencia 15'; Venegas (yellow card) 31'; Gignac 48'; Meza (yellow card) 87'	Report	(yellow card) 15' Abella; 41' Furch; (red card) 67' Dória	Stadium: Universitario; Attendance: 41,431; Referee: Erick Yair Miranda

10 February 2019 6	Santos Laguna	1–1	Tijuana	Torreón
18:00	Correa (yellow card) 50' (goal) 58'; H. Rodríguez (yellow card) 71'; Arteaga (yellow card) 90+1'	Report	20' Bolaños	Stadium: Corona; Attendance: 22,986; Referee: Alejandro Funk Villafañe

16 February 2019 7	Cruz Azul	1–2	Santos Laguna	Mexico City
17:00 CST	Alvarado (yellow card) 21'; Caraglio 24'; Aldrete (yellow card) 66'; Cauteruccio (yellow card) 75'; Domínguez (yellow card) 88'; Corona (yellow card) 90+4'	Report	30' Nervo; 47' Preciado; (yellow card) 72' Moreno; (yellow card) 85' de Buen	Stadium: Azteca; Attendance: 12,231; Referee: Eduardo Galván Basulto

24 February 2019 8	Santos Laguna	4–0	Toluca	Torreón
18:00	Valdés 5', 63'; Preciado 23'; Correa 39' (pen.)	Report	(yellow card) 9' Mancuello; (red card) 33' S. García; (yellow card) 37' Mora	Stadium: Corona; Attendance: 24,877; Referee: Luis Enrique Santander

2 March 2019 9	León	3–0	Santos Laguna	León
19:00 CST	Mena 51', 77'; Tesillo 89'	Report	Lozano (yellow card) 53'	Stadium: Estadio León; Referee: César Arturo Ramos Palazuelos

8 March 2019 10	Veracruz	2–2	Santos Laguna	Veracruz
19:00 CST	Carrasco 9'; Murillo (yellow card) 34'; Chávez 79'	Report	Furch 25'; Lozano (yellow card) 40'; Correa 74'; Abella (yellow card) 89'	Stadium: Estadio Luis "Pirata" Fuente; Referee: Jorge Isaac Rojas Castillo

17 March 2019 11	Santos Laguna	1–2	Necaxa	Torreón
18:06	Furch 54'; Abella (yellow card) 68'; Valdés (yellow card) 87'	Report	Castro 16'; Peña (yellow card) 70'; Contreras 90', (yellow card) 90'	Stadium: Corona; Referee: Fernando Guerrero Ramírez

29 March 2019 12	Atlas	1–0	Santos Laguna	Guadalajara
21:00 CST	Govea (yellow card) 17'; Segura (yellow card) 22'; Díaz (yellow card) 24'; Santamaría (yellow card) 59'; Isijara (yellow card) 64', (goal) 84'	Report	Valdés (yellow card) 33'; Abella (yellow card) 75'	Stadium: Estadio Jalisco; Referee: Fernando Hernandez Gomez

7 April 2019 13	Santos Laguna	0–0	Pachuca	Torreón
18:06	Angulo (yellow card) 32' (yellow-red card) 40'; Preciado (yellow card) 37'	Report	Sosa (yellow card) 3'; García (yellow card) 68'; J. Hernández (yellow card) 81'	Stadium: Corona; Referee: Oscar Mejia Garcia

13 April 2019 14	Monterrey	4–0	Santos Laguna	Guadalupe
21:00	Pizarro 22'; Funes Mori 60', 76', 87'	Report	Quiñones (yellow card) 75'	Stadium: Estadio BBVA Bancomer; Referee: Luis Enrique Santander Aguirre

21 April 2019 15	Santos Laguna	2–1	Querétaro	Torreón
18:06	Milke 6' (o.g.); Alcalá 17' (o.g.); Dória (yellow card) 36'	Report	Loba 46'; Corral (yellow card) 47'; Samudio (yellow card) 89'	Stadium: Corona; Referee: Francisco Chacón Gutiérrez

27 April 2019 16	América	1–0	Santos Laguna	Mexico City
19:00 CDT	Aguilera 14'; P. Aguilar (yellow card) 78' (yellow-red card) 78'; Álvarez (yellow card) 88'	Report	Abella (red card) 71'; Dória (yellow card) 90'	Stadium: Estadio Azteca; Referee: Jorge Isaac Rojas Castillo

=== CONCACAF Champions League ===
==== Round of 16 ====
20 February 2019 First leg	Marathón (Honduras)	2–6	(Mexico) Santos Laguna	San Pedro Sula, Honduras
19:00	Banegas (yellow card) 43'; Solani (yellow card) 45+1'; Ramírez 50'; Arboleda (yellow card) 73' (goal) 74'	Report	(yellow card) 14' Abella; 20', 32', 38' Correa; 49' Dória; 61' Moreno; 68' Furch; (yellow card) 84' Rivas	Stadium: Estadio Olímpico Metropolitano; Referee: (Cuba) Yadel Martínez

27 February 2019 Second leg	Santos Laguna (Mexico)	5–0 (11–2 agg.)	(Honduras) Marathón	Torreón, Mexico
19:00	Moreno 19'; Furch 22'; Rivas 31'; Aguirre 82'; de Buen 85' (pen.)	Report	(yellow card) 25' B. Martínez; (yellow card) 30' Córdova; (yellow card) 65' Bernárdez; (yellow card) 68' Banegas	Stadium: Corona; Referee: (Canada) Drew Fischer

==== Quarterfinals ====
6 March 2019 First leg	New York Red Bulls (United States)	0–2	(Mexico) Santos Laguna	Harrison, United States
19:00	Muyl (yellow card) 57'; Gamarra (yellow card) 60'; Rzatkowski (yellow card) 81'		Moreno (yellow card) 33'; Valdés 42'; Furch 48'	Stadium: Red Bull Arena

13 March 2019 Second leg	Santos Laguna (Mexico)	4–2 (6–2 agg.)	(United States) New York Red Bulls	Torreón, Mexico
19:00				Stadium: Corona; Referee: John Pitti

==== Semi-finals ====
3 April 2019 First Leg	UANL (Mexico)	3–0	(Mexico) Santos Laguna	San Nicolás de los Garza
22:00 (20:00 UTC−6)	Vargas 8'; Valencia 27', 37'	Report		Stadium: Estadio Universitario; Referee: Ismail Elfath (United States)

10 April 2019 Second Leg	Santos Laguna (Mexico)	3–2 (3–5 agg.)	(Mexico) UANL	Torreón
20:00 (19:00 UTC−5)	Valdes (yellow card) 6', (goal) 77'; Lozano (yellow card) 27'; Correa (yellow card) 31'; Furch 41', 60', (yellow card) 90+1'; Nervo (yellow card) 65'; Arteaga (yellow card) 70'	Report	Valencia 11'; J. Quiñones 34'; L. Quiñones (yellow card) 58'; Salcedo (yellow card) 79'; Rodríguez (yellow card) 90+2'; Ayala (yellow card) 90+3'	Stadium: Estadio Corona; Referee: Marco Ortiz

== Statistics ==
=== Goals ===
As of 27 February 2019

Rank	No.	Player	Pos.	Apertura	Apertura Copa MX	Clausura	Concacaf CL	Total
1	9	(Argentina) Julio Furch	FW	12	0	2	2	16
2	24	(Uruguay) Jonathan Rodríguez	FW	9	0	-	-	9
3	24	(Argentina) Javier Correa	FW	-	-	3	3	6
4	18	(Ecuador) Ayrton Preciado	FW	0	1	2	0	3
5	15	(Uruguay) Brian Lozano	MF	2	0	0	0	2
5	21	(Brazil) Dória	DF	1	0	0	1	2
5	10	(Chile) Diego Valdés	MF	-	-	2	0	2
5	11	(Colombia) Marlos Moreno	FW	0	0	0	2	2
10	10	(Paraguay) Osvaldo Martínez	MF	1	0	-	-	1
10	22	(Colombia) Deinner Quiñones	MF	1	0	0	0	1
10	8	(Mexico) Carlos Orrantia	MF	1	0	0	0	1
10	23	(Mexico) José Juan Vázquez	MF	0	0	1	0	1
10	5	(Argentina) Martín Nervo	DF	0	0	1	0	1
10	16	(Mexico) Ulises Rivas	MF	0	0	0	1	1
10	19	(Mexico) Eduardo Aguirre	FW	0	0	0	1	1
10	6	(Mexico) Diego de Buen	MF	0	0	0	1	1
Own goals				0	0	0	0	0
Total				27	1	11	11	50

=== Assists ===
As of 27 February 2019

Rank	Player	Position	Apertura	Apertura Copa MX	Clausura	Concacaf CL	Total
1	(Argentina) Julio Furch	FW	5	0	1	0	6
2	(Uruguay) Brian Lozano	MF	4	0	0	0	4
3	(Uruguay) Jonathan Rodríguez	FW	3	0	-	-	3
4	(Mexico) José Juan Vázquez	MF	0	0	2	1	3
4	(Mexico) Jesús Angulo	DF	1	0	1	1	3
4	(Mexico) José Abella	DF	1	0	1	1	3
7	(Ecuador) Ayrton Preciado	FW	2	0	0	0	2
7	(Mexico) Carlos Orrantia	MF	1	0	0	1	2
7	(Colombia) Marlos Moreno	FW	0	0	0	2	2
10	(Mexico) Jesús Isijara	MF	1	0	-	-	1
10	(Mexico) Ulises Rivas	MF	0	0	1	0	1
10	(Mexico) Hugo Isaác Rodríguez	DF	0	0	1	0	1
10	(Paraguay) Osvaldo Martínez	MF	1	0	-	-	1
Total			19	0	7	6	32

=== Hat-tricks ===
As of 20 February 2019

Player	Against	Result	Date	Competition
(Argentina) Javier Correa	Marathón	6–2 (A)	20 February 2019	CONCACAF Champions League

=== Clean sheets ===
As of 8 December 2018

Rank	Name	Liga MX	Copa MX	Concacaf CL	Total
1	(Mexico) Jonathan Orozco	4	0	0	4
2	(Mexico) Carlos Acevedo	0	1	0	1
Total		4	1	0	5
