= 2019 CONCACAF Champions League =

54th edition of premier club football tournament organized by CONCACAF

2019 Scotiabank CONCACAF Champions League
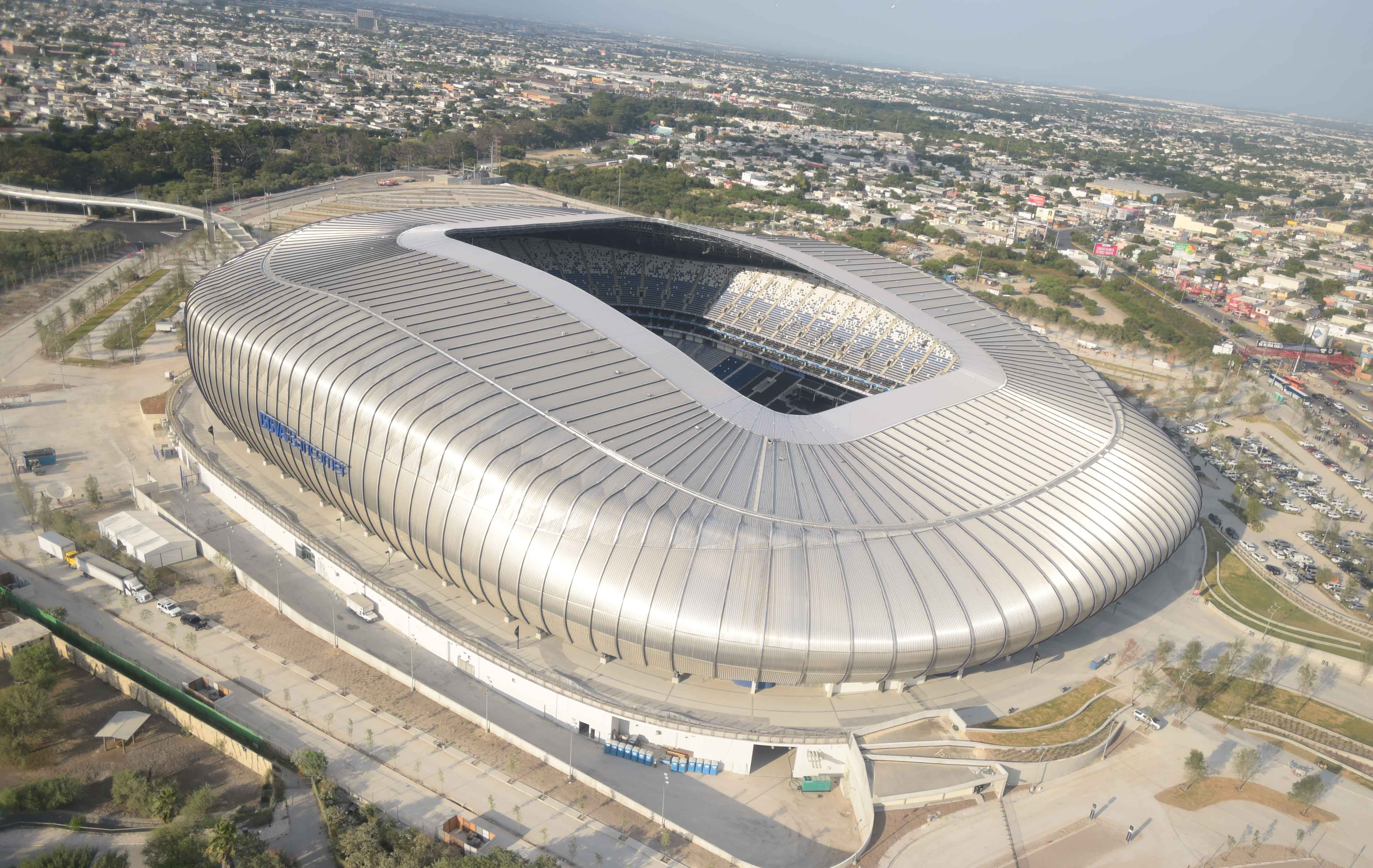
- Estadio BBVA in Guadalupe hosted the second leg of the final

Tournament details
- Dates: 19 February – 1 May 2019
- Teams: 16 (from 9 associations)

Final positions
- Champions: (Mexico) Monterrey (4th title)
- Runners-up: (Mexico) Tigres UANL

Tournament statistics
- Matches played: 30
- Goals scored: 93 (3.1 per match)
- Top scorer(s): (Ecuador) Enner Valencia (7 goals)
- Best player: (Argentina) Nicolás Sánchez
- Best young player: (Mexico) Jonathan González
- Best goalkeeper: (Argentina) Marcelo Barovero
- Fair play award: (United States) Sporting Kansas City

The 2019 CONCACAF Champions League (officially the 2019 Scotiabank CONCACAF Champions League) was the 11th edition of the CONCACAF Champions League under its current name, and overall the 54th edition of the premier football club competition organized by CONCACAF, the regional governing body of North America, Central America, and the Caribbean.

Monterrey defeated Tigres UANL 2–1 on aggregate in the final to win their fourth title. As the winners of the 2019 CONCACAF Champions League, they qualified for the 2019 FIFA Club World Cup in Qatar. Guadalajara were the title holders, but did not qualify for this tournament and were unable to defend their title.

== Qualification ==
A total of 16 teams participated in the CONCACAF Champions League:

- North American Zone: 9 teams (from three associations)
- Central American Zone: 5 teams (from five associations)
- Caribbean Zone: 1 team (from one association)
- Winners of the CONCACAF League (from one association, from either Central American Zone or Caribbean Zone)

Therefore, teams from either 9 or 10 out of the 41 CONCACAF member associations could participate in the CONCACAF Champions League.

=== North America ===
The nine berths for the North American Football Union (NAFU) were allocated to the three NAFU member associations as follows: four berths each for Mexico and the United States, and one berth for Canada.

For Mexico, the champions and runners-up of the Liga MX Apertura and Clausura Liguilla (playoff) tournaments qualified for the CONCACAF Champions League. If there was any team which were finalists of both tournaments, the vacated berth was reallocated using a formula, based on regular season records, that ensured that two teams qualified via each tournament.

For the United States, because of the restructuring of the CONCACAF Champions League starting from 2018, two teams each from the 2017 and 2018 seasons qualified for the 2019 CONCACAF Champions League:

- The champions of the MLS Cup, the championship match of the MLS Cup Playoffs, in 2017 and 2018
- The champions of the U.S. Open Cup, its domestic cup competition, in 2017 and 2018

This meant that the Supporters' Shield champions in 2017 and 2018, and the Eastern Conference or Western Conference regular season champions which were not Supporters' Shield champions in 2017 and 2018, which would have qualified for the CONCACAF Champions League in the usual setup, were not guaranteed a berth in the 2019 CONCACAF Champions League. If there was any team which qualified through multiple berths, or if there was any Canada-based MLS team which were champions of the 2017 or 2018 MLS Cup, the vacated berth was reallocated to the U.S.-based team with the best aggregate record over the 2017 and 2018 MLS regular seasons.

For Canada, the champions of the Canadian Championship, its domestic cup competition which awards the Voyageurs Cup, qualified for the CONCACAF Champions League. While some Canada-based teams competed in MLS, they could not qualify through either the MLS regular season or playoffs.

=== Central America ===
The five berths for the Central American Football Union (UNCAF) were allocated to five of the seven UNCAF member associations as follows: one berth for each of Costa Rica, El Salvador, Guatemala, Honduras, and Panama. As all of the leagues of Central America employed a split season with two tournaments in one season, the champions with the better aggregate record (or any team which were champions of both tournaments) in the leagues of Costa Rica, El Salvador, Guatemala, Honduras, and Panama qualified for the CONCACAF Champions League. Another 13 teams from Central America, which qualified through their domestic leagues, entered the CONCACAF League.

If teams from any Central American associations were excluded, they were replaced by teams from other Central American associations, with the associations chosen based on results from previous CONCACAF Champions League tournaments.

=== Caribbean ===
The sole berth for the Caribbean Football Union (CFU), which consisted of 31 member associations, was allocated via the CONCACAF Caribbean Club Championship, the first-tier subcontinental Caribbean club tournament. Since 2018, the CONCACAF Caribbean Club Championship was open to teams from professional leagues. To qualify for the CONCACAF Caribbean Club Championship, teams had to finish as the champions or runners-up of their respective association's league in the previous season.

The champions of the CONCACAF Caribbean Club Championship qualified for the CONCACAF Champions League. Another three teams from the Caribbean, which qualified through the CONCACAF Caribbean Club Championship or CONCACAF Caribbean Club Shield (via a playoff), entered the CONCACAF League.

=== CONCACAF League ===
Besides the 15 direct entrants of the CONCACAF Champions League, another 16 teams (13 from Central America and 3 from the Caribbean) entered the CONCACAF League, a tournament held from August to October prior to the CONCACAF Champions League. The champions of the CONCACAF League qualified for the CONCACAF Champions League.

== Teams ==
The following 16 teams (from nine associations) qualified for the tournament.

In the following table, the number of appearances, last appearance, and previous best result count only those in the CONCACAF Champions League era starting from 2008–09 (not counting those in the era of the Champions' Cup from 1962 to 2008).

Qualified teams from North America (9 teams)
Association	Team	Qualifying method	App. (last)	Previous best (last)
Mexico (4 berths)	Tigres UANL	2017 Apertura champions	5th (2018)	Runners-up (2016–17)
Mexico (4 berths)	Santos Laguna	2018 Clausura champions	6th (2015–16)	Runners-up (2012–13)
Mexico (4 berths)	Monterrey	2017 Apertura runners-up	5th (2016–17)	Champions (2012–13)
Mexico (4 berths)	Toluca	2018 Clausura runners-up	4th (2013–14)	Runners-up (2013–14)
United States (4 berths)	Atlanta United FC	2018 MLS Cup champions	1st	Debut
United States (4 berths)	Sporting Kansas City	2017 U.S. Open Cup champions	4th (2016–17)	Quarter-finals (2013–14)
United States (4 berths)	Houston Dynamo	2018 U.S. Open Cup champions	5th (2013–14)	Quarter-finals (2012–13)
United States (4 berths)	New York Red Bulls	U.S. non-champions with best aggregate record in 2017 and 2018 MLS regular seasons	5th (2018)	Semi-finals (2018)
Canada (1 berth)	Toronto FC	2018 Canadian Championship champions	6th (2018)	Runners-up (2018)

Qualified teams from Central America (6 teams)
Association	Team	Qualifying method	App. (last)	Previous best (last)
Costa Rica (1 berth + CL winner)	Saprissa	Champions with better aggregate record in 2017–18 season (2018 Clausura)	8th (2018)	Semi-finals (2010–11)
Costa Rica (1 berth + CL winner)	Herediano	2018 CONCACAF League champions	9th (2018)	Semi-finals (2014–15)
El Salvador (1 berth)	Alianza	2017 Apertura and 2018 Clausura champions	3rd (2016–17)	Group stage (2016–17)
Guatemala (1 berth)	Guastatoya	2018 Guatemalan CONCACAF Champions League playoff winners	1st	Debut
Honduras (1 berth)	Marathón	Champions with better aggregate record in 2017–18 season (2018 Clausura)	5th (2012–13)	Quarter-finals (2009–10)
Panama (1 berth)	Independiente	Champions with better aggregate record in 2017–18 season (2018 Clausura)	1st	Debut

Qualified teams from Caribbean (1 team)
Association	Team	Qualifying method	App. (last)	Previous best (last)
Dominican Republic	Atlético Pantoja	2018 CONCACAF Caribbean Club Championship champions	1st	Debut

Notes

1. Guatemala (GUA): After the suspension of the National Football Federation of Guatemala was lifted by FIFA in June 2018, it was decided that the representative of Guatemala in the 2019 CONCACAF Champions League would be decided by a two-legged playoff between Antigua GFC (2017 Apertura champions) and Guastatoya (2018 Clausura champions), which was won by Guastatoya. Under the original qualification method, Antigua GFC would have qualified as champions with better aggregate record in 2017–18 season.
2. United States (USA): Due to the tournament's restructuring from 2017–18, the United States was represented in the 2019 CONCACAF Champions League by two teams each in the 2017 and 2018 seasons: the MLS Cup champions in 2017 and 2018, and the U.S. Open Cup champions in 2017 and 2018. This meant that the Supporters' Shield champions in 2017 and 2018, and the Eastern Conference and/or Western Conference regular season champions which were not Supporters' Shield champions in 2017 and 2018, which would have qualified for the CONCACAF Champions League in the usual setup, were not guaranteed a berth in the 2019 CONCACAF Champions League. If a team qualified through multiple berths, or if any of the MLS berths were taken by a Canada-based MLS team, the vacated berth was reallocated to the U.S. non-champions with the best aggregate record over the 2017 and 2018 MLS regular seasons. As the 2017 MLS Cup was won by the Canadian team Toronto FC, and Atlanta United won the MLS Cup 2018 after qualifying with the aggregate record from both 2017 and 2018 seasons a few weeks earlier, this berth was reallocated based on the above method to the New York Red Bulls.

== Draw ==
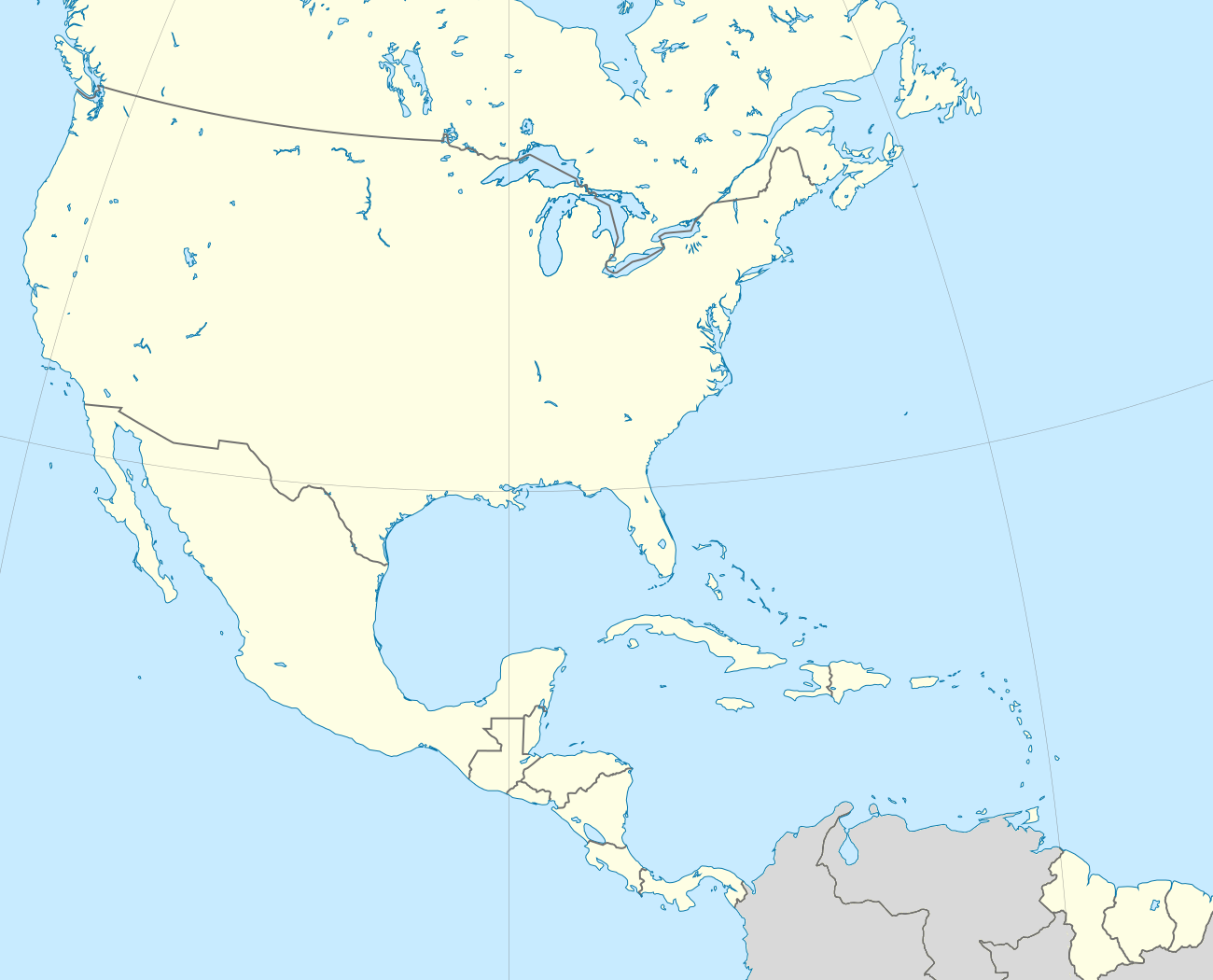
Location of teams of the 2019 CONCACAF Champions League
North American Zone Central American Zone Caribbean Zone

The draw for the 2019 CONCACAF Champions League was held on 3 December 2018, 19:00 EST (UTC−5), at the Univision Studios in Miami, Florida, United States.

The draw determined each tie in the round of 16 (numbered 1 through 8) between a team from Pot 1 and a team from Pot 2, each containing eight teams. The "Bracket Position Pots" (Pot A and Pot B) contained the bracket positions numbered 1 through 8 corresponding to each tie. The teams from Pot 1 were assigned a bracket position from Pot A and the teams from Pot 2 were assigned a bracket position from Pot B. Teams from the same association could not be drawn against each other in the round of 16 except for "wildcard" teams which replaced a team from another association.

The seeding of teams were based on the CONCACAF Club Index. Each team qualified for the CONCACAF League based on criteria set by the respective associations (e.g., tournament champions, runners-up, cup champions), resulting in an assigned slot (e.g., MEX1, MEX2) for each team. The CONCACAF Club Index, instead of ranking each team, was based on the on-field performance of the teams that have occupied the respective qualifying slots in the previous five editions of the CONCACAF Champions League. To determine the total points awarded to a slot in any single edition of the CONCACAF Champions League, CONCACAF used the following formula:

Points per	Participation	Win	Draw	Stage advanced	Champions
Points per	4	3	1	1	2

The 16 teams were distributed in the pots as follows:

Pot	Rank	Slot	2013–14	2014–15	2015–16	2016–17	2018	Total	Team
Pot 1	1	MEX3	29	32	23	15	17	116	(Mexico) Monterrey
Pot 1	2	MEX1	22	11	33	27	12	105	(Mexico) Tigres UANL
Pot 1	3	MEX2	10	16	20	30	25	101	(Mexico) Santos Laguna
Pot 1	4	CAN1	10	23	8	22	21	84	(Canada) Toronto FC
Pot 1	5	USA3	11	13	16	20	17	77	(United States) Houston Dynamo
Pot 1	6	MEX4	29	9	18	10	9	75	(Mexico) Toluca
Pot 1	7	USA4	16	20	16	8	5	65	(United States) New York Red Bulls
Pot 1	8	USA1	17	11	14	11	11	64	(United States) Atlanta United FC
Pot 2	9	PAN1	15	4	10	20	8	57	(Panama) Independiente
Pot 2	10	USA2	13	9	13	14	7	56	(United States) Sporting Kansas City
Pot 2	11	CRC1	19	12	10	8	5	54	(Costa Rica) Saprissa
Pot 2	12	HON1	11	15	10	11	5	52	(Honduras) Marathón
Pot 2	13	GUA1	10	11	8	9	0	38	(Guatemala) Guastatoya
Pot 2	14	SLV1	8	4	7	9	7	35	(El Salvador) Alianza
Pot 2	15	CCC1	5	4	8	5	4	26	(Dominican Republic) Atlético Pantoja
Pot 2	16	SCL1	0	0	0	0	5	5	(Costa Rica) Herediano

Notes

1. ^{USA} The identity of the teams qualifying for two of the four slots for the United States (USA1 and USA4) was not known at the time of the draw, and was later determined based on the result of the 2018 MLS Cup on 8 December 2018. As Atlanta United FC were certain to participate in the 2019 CONCACAF Champions League and be seeded in Pot 1 (qualifying for either USA1 or USA4) at the time of the draw, they were included in the draw and assigned a bracket position from Pot A by the draw. They later won the 2018 MLS Cup and qualified for USA1, and the New York Red Bulls qualified for USA4.

== Format ==
In the CONCACAF Champions League, the 16 teams played a single-elimination tournament. Each tie was played on a home-and-away two-legged basis.

- In the round of 16, quarter-finals, and semi-finals, the away goals rule was applied if the aggregate score was tied after the second leg. If still tied, a penalty shoot-out was used to determine the winner (Regulations II, Article F).
- In the final, the away goals rule was not applied, and extra time would be played if the aggregate score was tied after the second leg. If the aggregate score was still tied after extra time, a penalty shoot-out would be used to determine the winner (Regulations II, Article G).

== Schedule ==
The schedule of the competition was as follows.

	First leg	Second leg
Round of 16	19–21 February 2019	26–28 February 2019
Quarter-finals	5–6 March 2019	12–14 March 2019
Semi-finals	3–4 April 2019	10–11 April 2019
Final	23 April 2019	1 May 2019

Times are Eastern Time, as listed by CONCACAF (local times are in parentheses):

- Times up to 9 March 2019 (round of 16 and quarter-finals first legs) are Eastern Standard Time, i.e., UTC−5.
- Times thereafter (quarter-finals second legs and beyond) are Eastern Daylight Time, i.e., UTC−4.

== Bracket ==
Round of 16
(Guatemala) Guastatoya	0	1	1
(United States) Houston Dynamo	1	2	3
(Costa Rica) Saprissa	1	1	2
(Mexico) Tigres UANL	0	5	5
(Dominican Republic) Atlético Pantoja	0	0	0
(United States) New York Red Bulls	2	3	5
(Honduras) Marathón	2	0	2
(Mexico) Santos Laguna	6	5	11
(El Salvador) Alianza	0	0	0
(Mexico) Monterrey	0	1	1
(Costa Rica) Herediano	3	0	3
(United States) Atlanta United FC	1	4	5
(Panama) Independiente	4	1	5
(Canada) Toronto FC	0	1	1
(United States) Sporting Kansas City	3	2	5
(Mexico) Toluca	0	0	0

Quarter-finals
(United States) Houston Dynamo	0	0	0
(Mexico) Tigres UANL	2	1	3
(United States) New York Red Bulls	0	2	2
(Mexico) Santos Laguna	2	4	6
(Mexico) Monterrey	3	0	3
(United States) Atlanta United FC	0	1	1
(Panama) Independiente	2	0	2
(United States) Sporting Kansas City	1	3	4

Semi-finals
(Mexico) Tigres UANL	3	2	5
(Mexico) Santos Laguna	0	3	3
(Mexico) Monterrey	5	5	10
(United States) Sporting Kansas City	0	2	2

Final
(Mexico) Tigres UANL	0	1	1
(Mexico) Monterrey	1	1	2

== Round of 16 ==
In the round of 16, the matchups were decided by draw: R16-1 through R16-8. The teams from Pot 1 in the draw hosted the second leg.

=== Summary ===
The first legs were played from 19–21 February, and the second legs were played from 26–28 February 2019.

Team 1	Agg.	Team 2	1st leg	2nd leg
Marathón (Honduras)	2–11	(Mexico) Santos Laguna	2–6	0–5
Atlético Pantoja (Dominican Republic)	0–5	(United States) New York Red Bulls	0–2	0–3
Saprissa (Costa Rica)	2–5	(Mexico) Tigres UANL	1–0	1–5
Guastatoya (Guatemala)	1–3	(United States) Houston Dynamo	0–1	1–2
Sporting Kansas City (United States)	5–0	(Mexico) Toluca	3–0	2–0
Independiente (Panama)	5–1	(Canada) Toronto FC	4–0	1–1
Herediano (Costa Rica)	3–5	(United States) Atlanta United FC	3–1	0–4
Alianza (El Salvador)	0–1	(Mexico) Monterrey	0–0	0–1

=== Matches ===
20 February 2019
20:00 (19:00 UTC−6)

Marathón (Honduras)	2–6	(Mexico) Santos Laguna
Ramírez 50'; Arboleda 74'	Report	Correa 19', 32', 38'; Dória 49'; Moreno 61'; Furch 68'

Estadio Olímpico Metropolitano, San Pedro Sula
Referee: Yadel Martínez (Cuba)
27 February 2019
20:00 (19:00 UTC−6)

Santos Laguna (Mexico)	5–0	(Honduras) Marathón
Moreno 19'; Furch 22'; Rivas 31'; Aguirre 81'; De Buen 85' (pen.)	Report

Estadio Corona, Torreón
Referee: Drew Fischer (Canada)

Santos Laguna won 11–2 on aggregate.

20 February 2019
20:00 (21:00 UTC−4)

Atlético Pantoja (Dominican Republic)	0–2	(United States) New York Red Bulls
	Report	Innocent 39' (o.g.); Royer 66'

Estadio Olímpico Félix Sánchez, Santo Domingo
Referee: Ismael Cornejo (El Salvador)
27 February 2019
20:00 (20:00 UTC−5)

New York Red Bulls (United States)	3–0	(Dominican Republic) Atlético Pantoja
Davis 27'; Royer 32' (pen.); Ivan 75'	Report

Red Bull Arena, Harrison
Attendance: 3,417
Referee: John Pitti (Panama)

New York Red Bulls won 5–0 on aggregate.

19 February 2019
20:00 (19:00 UTC−6)

Saprissa (Costa Rica)	1–0	(Mexico) Tigres UANL
Venegas 73'	Report

Estadio Ricardo Saprissa Aymá, San Juan de Tibás
Referee: Jair Marrufo (United States)
26 February 2019
22:00 (21:00 UTC−6)

Tigres UANL (Mexico)	5–1	(Costa Rica) Saprissa
David 15' (o.g.); Valencia 25' (pen.), 27', 62'; Vargas 37'	Report	Torres 45'

Estadio Universitario, San Nicolás de los Garza
Attendance: 40,345
Referee: Joel Aguilar (El Salvador)

Tigres UANL won 5–2 on aggregate.

19 February 2019
22:00 (21:00 UTC−6)

Guastatoya (Guatemala)	0–1	(United States) Houston Dynamo
	Report	Beasley 84'

Estadio Doroteo Guamuch Flores, Guatemala City
Referee: Kimbell Ward (Saint Kitts and Nevis)
26 February 2019
20:00 (19:00 UTC−6)

Houston Dynamo (United States)	2–1	(Guatemala) Guastatoya
Manotas 77', 85'	Report	Navarro 72'

BBVA Compass Stadium, Houston
Attendance: 10,021
Referee: Saíd Martínez (Honduras)

Houston Dynamo won 3–1 on aggregate.

21 February 2019
20:00 (19:00 UTC−6)

Sporting Kansas City (United States)	3–0	(Mexico) Toluca
Németh 35'; Gerso 52'; Ilie 72'	Report

Children's Mercy Park, Kansas City
Attendance: 13,927
Referee: Henry Bejarano (Costa Rica)
28 February 2019
22:00 (21:00 UTC−6)

Toluca (Mexico)	0–2	(United States) Sporting Kansas City
	Report	Gerso 8'; Németh 62' (pen.)

Estadio Nemesio Díez, Toluca
Attendance: 14,519
Referee: Mario Escobar (Guatemala)

Sporting Kansas City won 5–0 on aggregate.

19 February 2019
20:00 (20:00 UTC−5)

Independiente (Panama)	4–0	(Canada) Toronto FC
Ayarza 9'; Browne 48'; Ivey 52', 78'	Report

Estadio Agustín Sánchez, La Chorrera
Referee: Iván Barton (El Salvador)
26 February 2019
20:00 (20:00 UTC−5)

Toronto FC (Canada)	1–1	(Panama) Independiente
Hamilton 19'	Report	Browne 67'

BMO Field, Toronto
Referee: Juan Gabriel Calderón (Costa Rica)

Independiente won 5–1 on aggregate.

21 February 2019
22:00 (21:00 UTC−6)

Herediano (Costa Rica)	3–1	(United States) Atlanta United FC
Ortiz 8'; Azofeifa 34'; Granados 49'	Report	Gressel 41'

Estadio Eladio Rosabal Cordero, Heredia
Attendance: 7,500
Referee: César Ramos (Mexico)
28 February 2019
20:00 (20:00 UTC−5)

Atlanta United FC (United States)	4–0	(Costa Rica) Herediano
J. Martínez 1', 63'; Gressel 9'; González Pírez 83'	Report

Fifth Third Bank Stadium, Kennesaw
Attendance: 8,589
Referee: Oshane Nation (Jamaica)

Atlanta United FC won 5–3 on aggregate.

20 February 2019
22:00 (21:00 UTC−6)

Alianza (El Salvador)	0–0	(Mexico) Monterrey
	Report

Estadio Cuscatlán, San Salvador
Attendance: 26,000
Referee: Kevin Morrison (Jamaica)
27 February 2019
22:00 (21:00 UTC−6)

Monterrey (Mexico)	1–0	(El Salvador) Alianza
Sánchez 86' (pen.)	Report

Estadio BBVA Bancomer, Guadalupe
Attendance: 22,000
Referee: David Gantar (Canada)

Monterrey won 1–0 on aggregate.

== Quarter-finals ==
In the quarter-finals, the matchups were determined as follows:

- QF1: Winner R16-1 vs. Winner R16-2
- QF2: Winner R16-3 vs. Winner R16-4
- QF3: Winner R16-5 vs. Winner R16-6
- QF4: Winner R16-7 vs. Winner R16-8

The winners of round of 16 matchups 1, 3, 5, and 7 hosted the second leg.

=== Summary ===
The first legs were played from 5–6 March, and the second legs were played from 12–14 March 2019.

Team 1	Agg.	Team 2	1st leg	2nd leg
New York Red Bulls (United States)	2–6	(Mexico) Santos Laguna	0–2	2–4
Houston Dynamo (United States)	0–3	(Mexico) Tigres UANL	0–2	0–1
Independiente (Panama)	2–4	(United States) Sporting Kansas City	2–1	0–3
Monterrey (Mexico)	3–1	(United States) Atlanta United FC	3–0	0–1

=== Matches ===
5 March 2019
20:00 (20:00 UTC−5)

New York Red Bulls (United States)	0–2	(Mexico) Santos Laguna
	Report	Valdés 42'; Furch 47'

Red Bull Arena, Harrison
Referee: Saíd Martínez (Honduras)
12 March 2019
21:00 (19:00 UTC−6)

Santos Laguna (Mexico)	4–2	(United States) New York Red Bulls
Abella 72'; Lozano 76', 81'; Valdés 79'	Report	Fernandez 4'; Royer 9'

Estadio Corona, Torreón
Referee: John Pitti (Panama)

Santos Laguna won 6–2 on aggregate.

5 March 2019
22:00 (21:00 UTC−6)

Houston Dynamo (United States)	0–2	(Mexico) Tigres UANL
	Report	Valencia 78'; J. Quiñones 81'

BBVA Compass Stadium, Houston
Attendance: 16,890
Referee: Iván Barton (El Salvador)
12 March 2019
23:00 (21:00 UTC−6)

Tigres UANL (Mexico)	1–0	(United States) Houston Dynamo
Salcedo 67'	Report

Estadio Universitario, San Nicolás de los Garza
Attendance: 41,615
Referee: Yadel Martínez (Cuba)

Tigres UANL won 3–0 on aggregate.

6 March 2019
20:00 (20:00 UTC−5)

Independiente (Panama)	2–1	(United States) Sporting Kansas City
Ivey 39'; Corpas 59'	Report	Ilie 51' (pen.)

Estadio Agustín Sánchez, La Chorrera
Referee: Fernando Guerrero (Mexico)
14 March 2019
20:00 (19:00 UTC−5)

Sporting Kansas City (United States)	3–0	(Panama) Independiente
Németh 74', 86'; Espinoza 82'	Report

Children's Mercy Park, Kansas City
Attendance: 13,212
Referee: Joel Aguilar (El Salvador)

Sporting Kansas City won 4–2 on aggregate.

6 March 2019
22:00 (21:00 UTC−6)

Monterrey (Mexico)	3–0	(United States) Atlanta United FC
Sánchez 17' (pen.); Pabón 80'; Gallardo 84'	Report

Estadio BBVA Bancomer, Guadalupe
Referee: Ismael Cornejo (El Salvador)
13 March 2019
20:00 (20:00 UTC−4)

Atlanta United FC (United States)	1–0	(Mexico) Monterrey
J. Martínez 78'	Report

Mercedes-Benz Stadium, Atlanta
Attendance: 40,048
Referee: Henry Bejarano (Costa Rica)

Monterrey won 3–1 on aggregate.

== Semi-finals ==
In the semi-finals, the matchups were determined as follows:

- SF1: Winner QF1 vs. Winner QF2
- SF2: Winner QF3 vs. Winner QF4

The semi-finalists in each tie which had the better performance in previous rounds hosted the second leg.

Pos	Team	Pld	W	D	L	GF	GA	GD	Pts	Host
1 (SF1)	(Mexico) Santos Laguna	4	4	0	0	17	4	+13	12	Second leg
2 (SF1)	(Mexico) Tigres UANL	4	3	0	1	8	2	+6	9	First leg
1 (SF2)	(United States) Sporting Kansas City	4	3	0	1	9	2	+7	9	Second leg
2 (SF2)	(Mexico) Monterrey	4	2	1	1	4	1	+3	7	First leg

Source: CONCACAF
Rules for classification: 1) Points; 2) Goal difference; 3) Goals scored; 4) Away goals scored; 5) Wins; 6) Away wins; 7) Disciplinary points; 8) Drawing of lots (Regulations II, Article H).

=== Summary ===
The first legs were played from 3–4 April, and the second legs were played from 10–11 April 2019.

Team 1	Agg.	Team 2	1st leg	2nd leg
Tigres UANL (Mexico)	5–3	(Mexico) Santos Laguna	3–0	2–3
Monterrey (Mexico)	10–2	(United States) Sporting Kansas City	5–0	5–2

=== Matches ===
3 April 2019
22:00 (20:00 UTC−6)

Tigres UANL (Mexico)	3–0	(Mexico) Santos Laguna
Vargas 8'; Valencia 27', 37'	Report

Estadio Universitario, San Nicolás de los Garza
Referee: Ismail Elfath (United States)
10 April 2019
20:00 (19:00 UTC−5)

Santos Laguna (Mexico)	3–2	(Mexico) Tigres UANL
Furch 41', 60'; Valdés 77'	Report	Valencia 11'; J. Quiñones 34'

Estadio Corona, Torreón
Referee: Marco Ortíz (Mexico)

Tigres UANL won 5–3 on aggregate.

4 April 2019
22:00 (20:00 UTC−6)

Monterrey (Mexico)	5–0	(United States) Sporting Kansas City
Pabón 7', 76'; Hurtado 14'; Gallardo 55'; Sánchez 70' (pen.)	Report

Estadio BBVA Bancomer, Guadalupe
Referee: Mario Escobar (Guatemala)
11 April 2019
21:00 (20:00 UTC−5)

Sporting Kansas City (United States)	2–5	(Mexico) Monterrey
Gerso 6', 29'	Report	Funes Mori 20', 90'; Pizarro 39'; Layún 61'; Hurtado 82'

Children's Mercy Park, Kansas City
Attendance: 18,467
Referee: Joel Aguilar (El Salvador)

Monterrey won 10–2 on aggregate.

== Final ==
In the final (winner SF1 vs. winner SF2), the finalist which had the better performances in previous rounds hosted the second leg.

Pos	Team	Pld	W	D	L	GF	GA	GD	Pts	Host
1	(Mexico) Monterrey	6	4	1	1	14	3	+11	13	Second leg
2	(Mexico) Tigres UANL	6	4	0	2	13	5	+8	12	First leg

Source: CONCACAF
Rules for classification: 1) Points; 2) Goal difference; 3) Goals scored; 4) Away goals scored; 5) Wins; 6) Away wins; 7) Disciplinary points; 8) Drawing of lots (Regulations II, Article H).

=== Summary ===
The first leg was played on 23 April, and the second leg was played on 1 May 2019.

Team 1	Agg.	Team 2	1st leg	2nd leg
Tigres UANL (Mexico)	1–2	(Mexico) Monterrey	0–1	1–1

=== Matches ===
23 April 2019
22:00 (21:00 UTC−5)

Tigres UANL (Mexico)	0–1	(Mexico) Monterrey
	Report	Sánchez 43'

Estadio Universitario, San Nicolás de los Garza
Attendance: 41,615
Referee: John Pitti (Panama)
1 May 2019
22:00 (21:00 UTC−5)

Monterrey (Mexico)	1–1	(Mexico) Tigres UANL
Sánchez 26' (pen.)	Report	Gignac 85'

Estadio BBVA Bancomer, Guadalupe
Attendance: 52,229
Referee: Jair Marrufo (United States)

Monterrey won 2–1 on aggregate.

== Top goalscorers ==
Team eliminated for this round.

Rank	Player	Club	Goals	By round							
Rank	Player	Club	Goals	1R1	1R2	QF1	QF2	SF1	SF2	F1	F2
1	(Ecuador) Enner Valencia	(Mexico) Tigres UANL	7		3	1		2	1		
2	(Argentina) Julio Furch	(Mexico) Santos Laguna	5	1	1	1			2		
2	(Argentina) Nicolás Sánchez	(Mexico) Monterrey	5		1	1		1		1	1
4	(Guinea-Bissau) Gerso Fernandes	(United States) Sporting Kansas City	4	1	1				2		
4	(Hungary) Krisztián Németh	(United States) Sporting Kansas City	4	1	1		2				
6	(Argentina) Javier Correa	(Mexico) Santos Laguna	3	3							
6	(Panama) Romeesh Ivey	(Panama) Independiente	3	2		1					
6	(Venezuela) Josef Martínez	(United States) Atlanta United FC	3		2		1				
6	(Colombia) Dorlan Pabón	(Mexico) Monterrey	3			1		2			
6	(Austria) Daniel Royer	(United States) New York Red Bulls	3	1	1		1				
6	(Chile) Diego Valdés	(Mexico) Santos Laguna	3			1	1		1		

Source: CONCACAF

== Awards ==
Award	Player	Club
Golden Ball	(Argentina) Nicolás Sánchez	(Mexico) Monterrey
Golden Boot	(Ecuador) Enner Valencia	(Mexico) Tigres UANL
Golden Glove	(Argentina) Marcelo Barovero	(Mexico) Monterrey
Best Young Player	(Mexico) Jonathan González	(Mexico) Monterrey
Fair Play Award	—	(United States) Sporting Kansas City

Team of the Tournament
Position	Player	Club
GK	(Argentina) Marcelo Barovero	(Mexico) Monterrey
DF	(Mexico) Miguel Layún	(Mexico) Monterrey
DF	(Argentina) Nicolás Sánchez	(Mexico) Monterrey
DF	(Mexico) Carlos Salcedo	(Mexico) Tigres UANL
DF	(Mexico) Jesús Dueñas	(Mexico) Tigres UANL
MF	(Mexico) Jesús Gallardo	(Mexico) Monterrey
MF	(Brazil) Rafael Carioca	(Mexico) Tigres UANL
MF	(Mexico) Carlos Rodríguez	(Mexico) Monterrey
MF	(Colombia) Luis Quiñones	(Mexico) Tigres UANL
FW	(Ecuador) Enner Valencia	(Mexico) Tigres UANL
FW	(Argentina) Julio Furch	(Mexico) Santos Laguna
Manager: (Uruguay) Diego Alonso ( (Mexico) Monterrey)

== See also ==
- 2018 CONCACAF League
