= Jesús Gallardo =

Mexican footballer (born 1994)

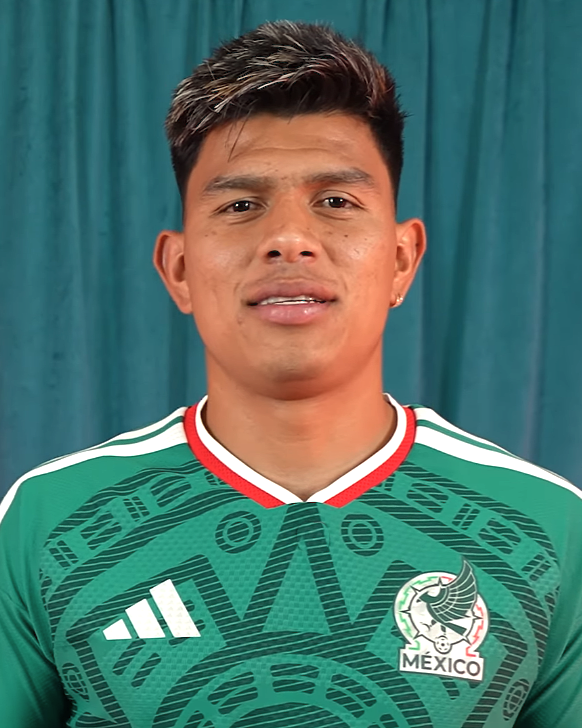
- Gallardo with Mexico in 2025

Personal information
- Full name: Jesús Daniel Gallardo Vasconcelos
- Date of birth: 15 August 1994 (age 32)
- Place of birth: Cárdenas, Tabasco, Mexico
- Height: 1.78 m (5 ft 10 in)
- Positions: Left-back; left winger

Team information
- Current team: Toluca
- Number: 20

Youth career
- 2009–2010: Once Hermanos
- 2011–2013: Jaguares de la 48
- 2013–2016: Pumas UNAM

Senior career*
Years	Team	Apps	(Gls)
2014–2018	Pumas UNAM	82	(11)
2018–2024	Monterrey	212	(21)
2024–	Toluca	73	(13)

International career^{‡}
2016–	Mexico	130	(3)
Medal record
Men's football
Representing Mexico
CONCACAF Gold Cup
Winner	2019 United States	Team
Winner	2023 United States–Canada	Team
Winner	2025 United States–Canada	Team
Runner-up	2021 United States	Team
CONCACAF Nations League
Winner	2025 United States
Runner-up	2021 United States
Runner-up	2024 United States
Third place	2023 United States
- * Club domestic league appearances and goals as of 27 July 2025 ‡ National team caps and goals as of 14 November 2026

Jesús Daniel Gallardo Vasconcelos (born 15 August 1994) is a Mexican professional footballer who plays as a left-back or left-winger for Liga MX club Toluca and the Mexico national team.

After passing through the youth academies of Once Hermanos, Jaguares de la 48, and Pumas UNAM, Gallardo made his debut for the senior Pumas UNAM team in 2014. Scoring 11 goals in 82 appearances, he departed the club for Monterrey in 2018. During his tenure with Los Rayados, Gallardo won one league title, one Copa MX title, and two CONCACAF Champions Cup titles, while making over 200 appearances and scoring 21 goals for the club. Since joining Toluca in 2024, Gallardo has won one league title.

Gallardo made his debut for Mexico in October 2016 in a friendly against New Zealand. He was part of Mexico's squads at the 2018, 2022 and 2026 FIFA World Cup. He was also involved in the squads that won the 2019, 2023, and 2025 CONCACAF Gold Cup, as well as the 2024–25 CONCACAF Nations League.

== Club career ==
=== Youth ===
Gallardo began his career at 15 years old with Once Hermanos from 2009, until making the switch to Jaguares de la 48 in 2011, and ultimately getting the attention of first division team Pumas UNAM. From there, in 2013, he joined Universidad Nacional youth academy, successfully going through the U-20 team and Pumas Morelos.

=== Pumas UNAM ===
In 2014, Gallardo was eventually promoted to the first team by coach Guillermo Vázquez. Gallardo scored his first goal with Pumas in a Copa MX group stage match against Toluca on 16 September 2014 that marked his debut with the jersey that ended 2–2 but didn't make his competitive league debut in Liga MX until 23 November 2014 which ended in a 4–2 win against Monterrey.

On 21 November 2016, he would score a brace against W Connection during the 2016–17 CONCACAF Champions League group stage that ended 8–1.

On 9 August 2017, during an Apertura 2017 Copa MX group stage match against Monterrey, he would score the tying goal during stoppage time, leaving the match 1–1.

=== Monterrey ===
==== 2018–19: Debut season, Copa MX, and first CONCACAF Champions League title ====
On 29 May 2018, Gallardo joined Monterrey. He would make his debut with the team on 21 July 2018 as a starter against Pachuca, winning 1–0. On 29 September, he would score his first goal with Monterrey, scoring on the 74th minute in a 3–0 win over Tijuana. On 20 October, in a league match against Toluca, he scored the tying goal at the 73rd minute in which Monterrey would later go on to win 2–1.

On 23 October he scored the decisive penalty in the shootout of the Apertura 2018 Copa MX semi-finals against Pachuca, sending his team to the final. On 3 November he provided an assist and scored a goal in Monterrey's 2–0 victory over Veracruz.

As Monterrey won the 2019 CONCACAF Champions League Finals against crosstown rivals Tigres UANL, he was included in the Team of the Tournament.

==== 2019–20: First league title and El Triplete ====
At the end of the December, he would win the Apertura championship finals against América.

With Monterrey's victory of the 2019–20 Copa MX, they had obtained the continental treble.

=== Toluca ===
On 5 June 2024, Gallardo was confirmed to have signed with Toluca for $5 million.

== International career ==
=== 2016–17: Beginnings and first CONCACAF Gold Cup ===
Gallardo received his first call up to the senior national team to replace the injured Ángel Sepúlveda for matches against New Zealand and Panama in October 2016, making his international debut on the 8th of the month as a starter against New Zealand in a 2–1 victory, contributing a crucial pass for the winning goal.

On 28 June 2017, Gallardo was called up to participate in the 2017 CONCACAF Gold Cup, managing to appear in all games until their 1–0 semi-final loss against Jamaica.

=== 2018–2019: First FIFA World Cup and second CONCACAF Gold Cup ===
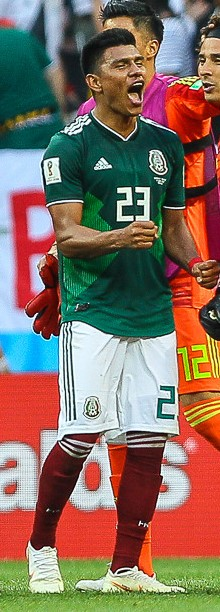
Gallardo celebrating following Mexico's 1–0 win over Germany during the 2018 World Cup

In May 2018, Gallardo was named in Mexico's preliminary 28-man squad for the World Cup, and in June, was ultimately included in the final 23-man roster.

During Mexico's final group stage match against Sweden, he received a yellow card in the 13th second of the match for his elbow contact made with Ola Toivonen's face, marking it as the fastest yellow card given in FIFA World Cup history. He went on to play as a starter in all of the group stage matches, including the round-of-16 loss against Brazil.

He was included in Gerardo Martino's preliminary roster for the 2019 CONCACAF Gold Cup and was eventually in the final list. He appeared in all matches of the tournament, as Mexico defeated the United States in the final. He was listed in the tournament's Best XI. Following the victory, Martino declared Gallardo to be the best player of the match.

=== 2022–2024: Second FIFA World Cup and 100th cap ===
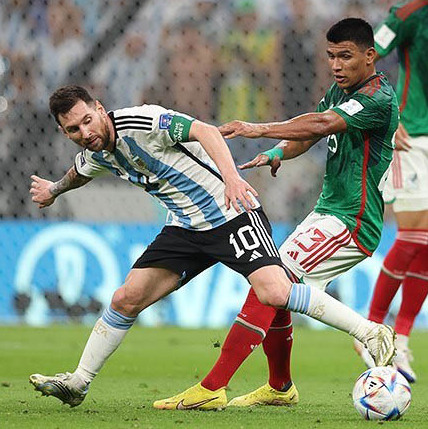
Gallardo facing-off Argentina's Lionel Messi during the 2022 World Cup

In October 2022, Gallardo was named in Mexico's preliminary 31-man squad for the World Cup, and in November, was ultimately included in the final 26-man roster.

On 7 September 2024, he played his 100th international match, according to the Mexican Football Federation, in a 3–0 friendly win over New Zealand.

On 25 January 2026, Gallardo appeared as captain in a 1–0 friendly victory over Bolivia. Gallardo was named in the 26-man squad for the 2026 FIFA World Cup, hosted on home soil.

== Style of play ==
Gallardo is known for intensity, pace, and physical strength, allowing him to be both dangerous and intense during a whole match. FIFA described him as "Gallardo's many assets include his speed, ability to take people on and his selfless distribution. A regular source of assists and the archetypal team player, he is adept at pressing high up the pitch and catching opponents out of position."

Starting off as a left-winger on the club level, former Mexico national team coach Juan Carlos Osorio used him on a more defensive position as left-back. With the arrival of new national team coach Gerardo Martino, he chose to keep him as a left-back.

== Career statistics ==
=== Club ===
As of match played on 19 May 2024

Appearances and goals by club, season and competition
Club	Season	League			National cup		Continental		Other		Total	
Club	Season	Division	Apps	Goals	Apps	Goals	Apps	Goals	Apps	Goals	Apps	Goals
Pumas UNAM	2014–15	Liga MX	13	0	8	1	—		—		21	1
Pumas UNAM	2015–16	Liga MX	1	0	4	0	2 (Note: Appearances in Copa Libertadores)	0	—		7	0
Pumas UNAM	2016–17	Liga MX	34	6	—		5 (Note: Appearances in CONCACAF Champions Cup)	2	—		39	8
Pumas UNAM	2017–18	Liga MX	34	5	5	2	—		—		39	7
Pumas UNAM	Total		82	11	17	3	7	2	—		106	16
Monterrey	2018–19	Liga MX	42	4	7	1	8	2	—		57	7
Monterrey	2019–20	Liga MX	32	5	8	1	—		2 (Note: Appearances in FIFA Club World Cup)	0	42	6
Monterrey	2020–21	Liga MX	32	0	—		6	1	—		38	1
Monterrey	2021–22	Liga MX	34	3	—		—		2	0	36	3
Monterrey	2022–23	Liga MX	41	6	—		—		—		41	6
Monterrey	2023–24	Liga MX	31	3	—		7	2	6 (Note: Appearances in Leagues Cup)	0	44	5
Monterrey	Total		212	21	15	2	21	5	10	0	258	28
Toluca	2024–25	Liga MX	0	0	—		—		0	0	0	0
Career total			294	32	32	5	28	7	10	0	364	44

=== International ===
As of match played on 14 November 2026

Appearances and goals by national team and year
National team	Year	Apps	Goals
Mexico	2016	2	0
Mexico	2017	16	0
Mexico	2018	14	0
Mexico	2019	11 (Note: Gallardo additionally played a match against Martinique in 2019, which is not recognized by FIFA.)	0
Mexico	2020	5	0
Mexico	2021	19	0
Mexico	2022	14	1
Mexico	2023	15	1
Mexico	2024	4	0
Mexico	2025	13	0
Mexico	2026	17	1
Total		130	3

Scores and results list Mexico's goal tally first.

List of international goals scored by Jesús Gallardo
No.	Date	Venue	Opponent	Score	Result	Competition
1	9 November 2022	Estadi Montilivi, Girona, Spain	Iraq	3–0	4–0	Friendly
2	18 June 2023	Allegiant Stadium, Paradise, United States	Panama	1–0	1–0	2023 CONCACAF Nations League Finals
3	25 February 2026	Estadio Corregidora, Querétaro, Mexico	Iceland	3–0	4–0	Friendly

== Honours ==
Monterrey

- Liga MX: Apertura 2019
- Copa MX: 2019–20
- CONCACAF Champions League: 2019, 2021

Toluca

- Liga MX: Clausura 2025, Apertura 2025
- Campeón de Campeones: 2025
- Campeones Cup: 2025
- CONCACAF Champions Cup: 2026
- Leagues Cup: 2026

Mexico

- CONCACAF Gold Cup: 2019, 2023, 2025
- CONCACAF Nations League: 2024–25

Individual

- CONCACAF Champions League/Cup Team of the Tournament: 2019, 2021, 2026
- CONCACAF Gold Cup Best XI: 2019
- CONCACAF Nations League Finals Best XI: 2023
- Liga MX Best XI: Clausura 2025, Apertura 2025
- Liga MX All-Star: 2025, 2026
- Liga MX Best Full-back: 2024–25

== See also ==
- List of men's footballers with 100 or more international caps
