= 2019 CONCACAF Champions League final =

- Event: 2019 CONCACAF Champions League
| Tigres UANL | Monterrey |
| (Mexico) | (Mexico) |
| 1 | 2 |
- on aggregate

First leg
| Tigres UANL | Monterrey |
| 0 | 1 |
- Date: 23 April 2019
- Venue: Estadio Universitario, San Nicolás de los Garza
- Man of the Match: Nicolás Sánchez (Monterrey)
- Referee: John Pitti (Panama)
- Attendance: 41,615

Second leg
| Monterrey | Tigres UANL |
| 1 | 1 |
- Date: 1 May 2019
- Venue: Estadio BBVA Bancomer, Guadalupe
- Man of the Match: Marcelo Barovero (Monterrey)
- Referee: Jair Marrufo (United States)
- Attendance: 52,229

The 2019 CONCACAF Champions League final was the final round of the 2019 CONCACAF Champions League, the 11th edition of the CONCACAF Champions League under its current name, and overall the 54th edition of the premier football club competition organised by CONCACAF, the regional governing body of North America, Central America and the Caribbean.

The final was contested in two-legged home-and-away format between Mexican teams Tigres UANL and Monterrey in a Clásico Regiomontano. The first leg was hosted by Tigres at the Estadio Universitario in San Nicolás de los Garza on 23 April 2019, while the second leg was hosted by Monterrey at the Estadio BBVA Bancomer in Guadalupe on 1 May 2019.

Monterrey won the final 2–1 on aggregate for their fourth CONCACAF Champions League title.

== Teams ==
In the following table, final until 2008 were in the CONCACAF Champions' Cup era, since 2009 were in the CONCACAF Champions League era.

| Team | Zone | Previous final appearances (bold indicates winners) |
|---|---|---|
| (Mexico) Tigres UANL | North America (NAFU) | 2 (2016, 2017) |
| (Mexico) Monterrey | North America (NAFU) | 3 (**2011**, **2012**, **2013**) |

This was the eighth all-Mexican final in the eleven editions of the CONCACAF Champions League, and guaranteed that for the fourteenth season in a row the CONCACAF club champions were from Mexico.

== Venues ==
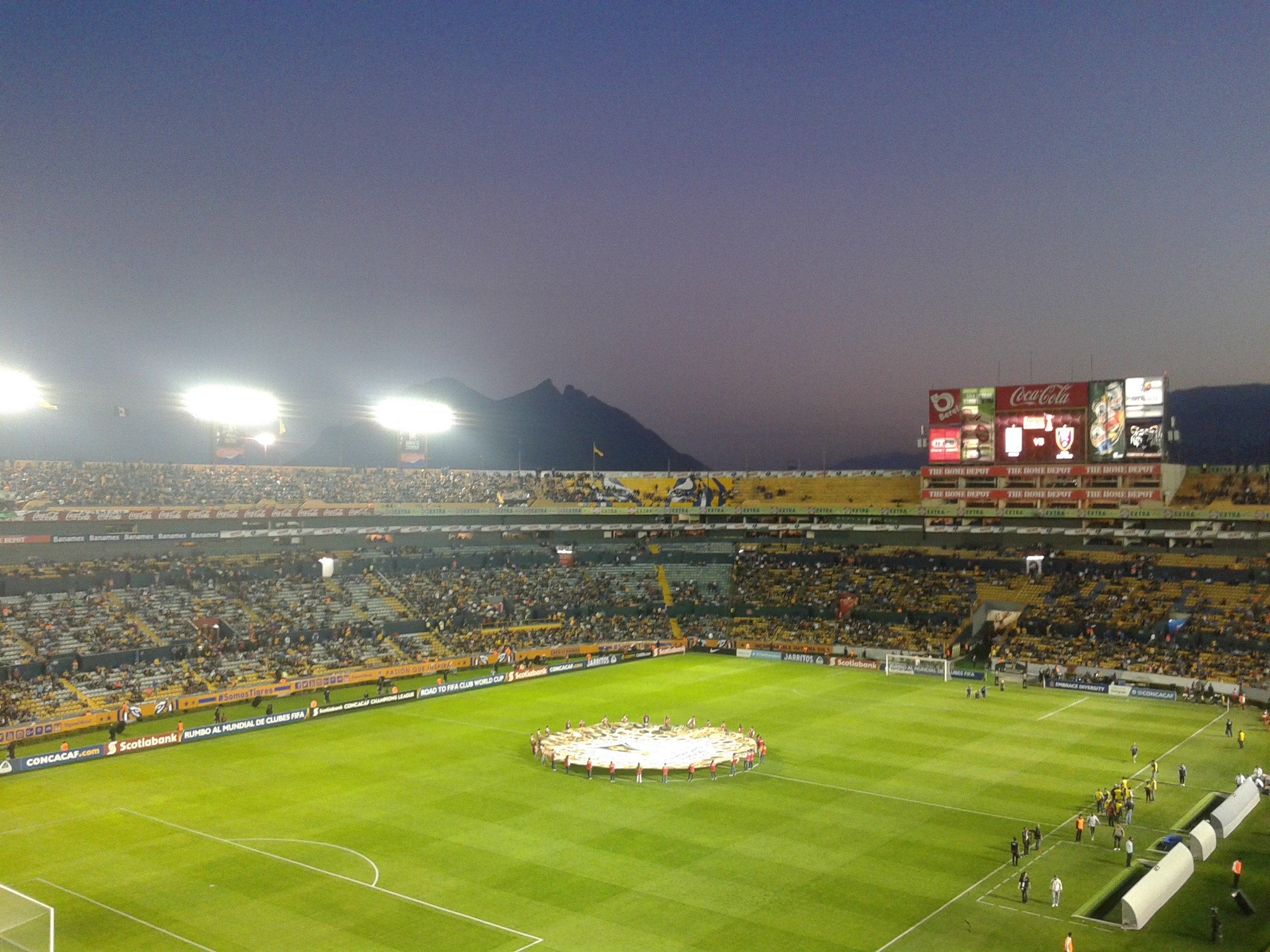
The Estadio Universitario in San Nicolás de los Garza, Mexico hosted the first leg.

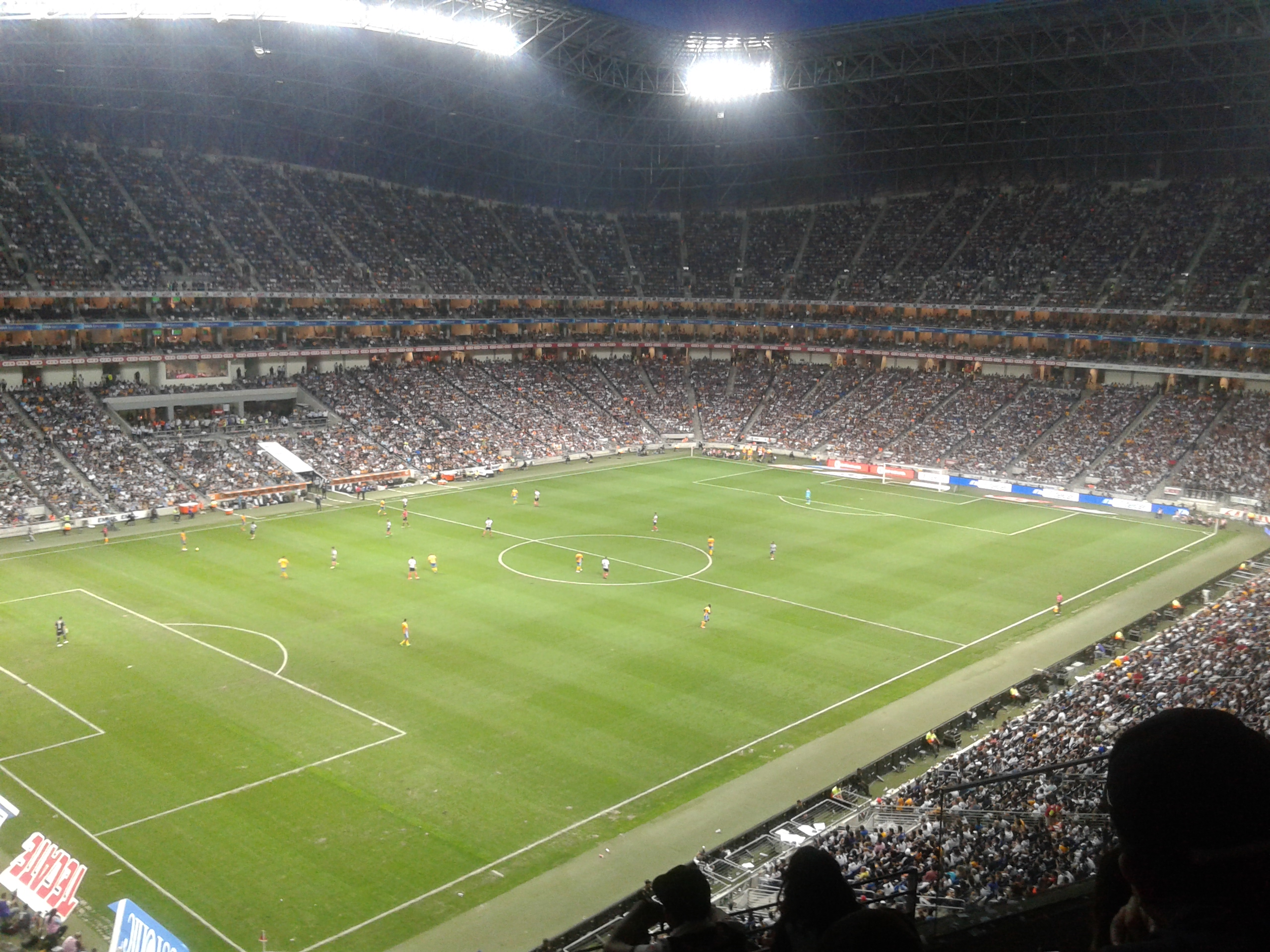
The Estadio BBVA Bancomer in Guadalupe, Mexico hosted the second leg.

== Road to the final ==
Note: In all results below, the score of the finalist is given first (H: home; A: away).

| (Mexico) Tigres UANL | | | | Round | (Mexico) Monterrey | | | |
|---|---|---|---|---|---|---|---|---|
| Opponent | Agg. | 1st leg | 2nd leg | | Opponent | Agg. | 1st leg | 2nd leg |
| (Costa Rica) Saprissa | 5–2 | 0–1 (A) | 5–1 (H) | Round of 16 | (El Salvador) Alianza | 1–0 | 0–0 (A) | 1–0 (H) |
| (United States) Houston Dynamo | 3–0 | 2–0 (A) | 1–0 (H) | Quarter-finals | (United States) Atlanta United FC | 3–1 | 3–0 (H) | 0–1 (A) |
| (Mexico) Santos Laguna | 5–3 | 3–0 (H) | 2–3 (A) | Semi-finals | (United States) Sporting Kansas City | 10–2 | 5–0 (H) | 5–2 (A) |

== Format ==
The final was played in a home-and-away two-legged series, with the team with the better performance in previous rounds (Monterrey) hosting the second leg.

If the aggregate score was tied after the second leg, the away goals rule would not be applied, and extra time would be played. If the aggregate score was still tied after extra time, a penalty shoot-out would be used to determine the winner (Regulations II, Article G).

=== Performance ranking ===
| Pos | Team | Pld | W | D | L | GF | GA | GD | Pts | Host |
|---|---|---|---|---|---|---|---|---|---|---|
| 1 | (Mexico) Monterrey | 6 | 4 | 1 | 1 | 14 | 3 | +11 | **13** | Second leg |
| 2 | (Mexico) Tigres UANL | 6 | 4 | 0 | 2 | 13 | 5 | +8 | **12** | First leg |

Source: CONCACAF
Rules for classification: 1) Points; 2) Goal difference; 3) Goals scored; 4) Away goals scored; 5) Wins; 6) Away wins; 7) Disciplinary points; 8) Drawing of lots (Regulations II, Article H).

== Matches ==
=== First leg ===
23 April 2019
21:00 UTC−5

| Tigres UANL (Mexico) | 0–1 | (Mexico) Monterrey |
|---|---|---|
| | Report | Sánchez 43' |

Estadio Universitario, San Nicolás de los Garza
Attendance: 41,615
Referee: John Pitti (Panama)

| **Tigres** | **Monterrey** |

| GK | 1 | (Argentina) Nahuel Guzmán |
| LB | 3 | (Mexico) Carlos Salcedo |
| CB | 4 | (Mexico) Hugo Ayala (yellow card) 20' |
| CB | 21 | (Colombia) Francisco Meza |
| RB | 29 | (Mexico) Jesús Dueñas |
| LM | 20 | (Mexico) Javier Aquino (substituted off) 59' |
| CM | 19 | (Argentina) Guido Pizarro |
| CM | 5 | (Brazil) Rafael Carioca |
| RM | 26 | (Colombia) Luis Quiñones |
| FW | 9 | (Chile) Eduardo Vargas (substituted off) 60' |
| FW | 13 | (Ecuador) Enner Valencia |
Substitutes
| MF | 25 | (Mexico) Jürgen Damm (substituted on) 59' |
| CF | 10 | (France) André-Pierre Gignac (substituted on) 60' |
Manager
(Brazil) Ricardo Ferretti

| GK | 1 | (Argentina) Marcelo Barovero |
| LB | 17 | (Mexico) Jesús Gallardo (yellow card) 90' |
| CB | 33 | (Colombia) Stefan Medina |
| CB | 4 | (Argentina) Nicolás Sánchez (yellow card) 14' |
| RB | 21 | (Mexico) Miguel Layún |
| CM | 29 | (Mexico) Carlos Rodríguez (substituted off) 89' |
| CM | 16 | (Paraguay) Celso Ortiz (yellow card) 58' |
| AM | 18 | (Colombia) Avilés Hurtado (substituted off) 72' (yellow card) 33' |
| AM | 20 | (Mexico) Rodolfo Pizarro |
| FW | 8 | (Colombia) Dorlan Pabón (substituted off) 88' |
| FW | 7 | (Argentina) Rogelio Funes Mori |
Substitutes
| MF | 32 | (Argentina) Maximiliano Meza (substituted on) 72' |
| LB | 11 | (Argentina) Leonel Vangioni (substituted on) 88' |
| MF | 35 | (Mexico) Eric Cantú (substituted on) 89' |
Manager
(Uruguay) Diego Alonso

Man of the Match:
Nicolás Sánchez (Monterrey)

Assistant referees:
Christian Ramírez (Honduras)
Alejandro Camarena (Panama)
Fourth official:
Saíd Martínez (Honduras)

**Match rules**

- 90 minutes.
- Seven named substitutes, of which up to three may be used.

=== Second leg ===
1 May 2019
21:00 UTC−5

| Monterrey (Mexico) | 1–1 | (Mexico) Tigres UANL |
|---|---|---|
| Sánchez 26' (pen.) | Report | Gignac 85' |

Estadio BBVA Bancomer, Guadalupe
Attendance: 52,229
Referee: Jair Marrufo (United States)

| **Monterrey** | **Tigres** |

| GK | 1 | (Argentina) Marcelo Barovero |
| LB | 17 | (Mexico) Jesús Gallardo |
| CB | 33 | (Colombia) Stefan Medina (yellow card) 48' |
| CB | 4 | (Argentina) Nicolás Sánchez |
| RB | 21 | (Mexico) Miguel Layún (yellow card) 43' |
| CM | 29 | (Mexico) Carlos Rodríguez (substituted off) 77' |
| CM | 16 | (Paraguay) Celso Ortiz |
| AM | 18 | (Colombia) Avilés Hurtado (substituted off) 61' |
| AM | 20 | (Mexico) Rodolfo Pizarro |
| FW | 8 | (Colombia) Dorlan Pabón (substituted off) 83' |
| FW | 7 | (Argentina) Rogelio Funes Mori |
Substitutes
| CB | 3 | (Mexico) César Montes (substituted on) 61' (yellow card) 90' |
| CM | 25 | (Mexico) Jonathan González (substituted on) 77' |
| MF | 32 | (Argentina) Maximiliano Meza (substituted on) 83' |
Manager
(Uruguay) Diego Alonso

| GK | 1 | (Argentina) Nahuel Guzmán |
| LB | 29 | (Mexico) Jesús Dueñas |
| CB | 3 | (Mexico) Carlos Salcedo (yellow card) 90+3' |
| CB | 4 | (Mexico) Hugo Ayala (substituted off) 72' |
| RB | 28 | (Mexico) Luis Rodríguez |
| LM | 25 | (Mexico) Jürgen Damm (substituted off) 46' |
| CM | 19 | (Argentina) Guido Pizarro |
| CM | 5 | (Brazil) Rafael Carioca (yellow card) 42' |
| RM | 26 | (Colombia) Luis Quiñones (yellow card) 45+1' |
| FW | 9 | (Chile) Eduardo Vargas (substituted off) 46' |
| FW | 13 | (Ecuador) Enner Valencia |
Substitutes
| MF | 20 | (Mexico) Javier Aquino (substituted on) 46' |
| CF | 10 | (France) André-Pierre Gignac (substituted on) 46' |
| MF | 8 | (Argentina) Lucas Zelarayán (substituted on) 72' |
Manager
(Brazil) Ricardo Ferretti

Man of the Match:
Marcelo Barovero (Monterrey)

Assistant referees:
Corey Rockwell (United States)
Frank Anderson (United States)
Fourth official:
Malcolm Villarreal (Saint Kitts and Nevis)

**Match rules**

- 90 minutes.
- 30 minutes of extra time if tied on aggregate (away goals rule not applied).
- Penalty shoot-out if still tied on aggregate after extra time.
- Seven named substitutes, of which up to three may be used, with a fourth allowed in extra time.
