= Julio Furch =

Argentine footballer

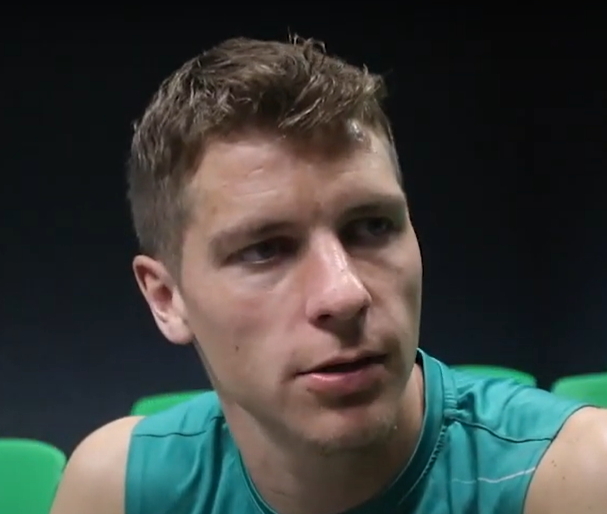
- Furch in 2020

Personal information
- Full name: Julio César Furch
- Date of birth: 29 July 1989 (age 37)
- Place of birth: Winifreda, Argentina
- Height: 1.88 m (6 ft 2 in)
- Position: Forward

Youth career
- 1994–1999: Deportivo Winifreda
- 2000–2004: Deportivo Mac Allister
- 2004–2006: Deportivo Winifreda
- 2009–2010: Olimpo

Senior career*
Years	Team	Apps	(Gls)
2006–2007	Deportivo Winifreda		(14)
2008	All Boys de Santa Rosa		(1)
2008	Deportivo Winifreda		(10)
2010–2014	Olimpo	52	(7)
2012	→ San Lorenzo (loan)	9	(0)
2013–2014	→ Arsenal de Sarandi (loan)	54	(14)
2014	Belgrano	18	(8)
2015–2016	Veracruz	69	(28)
2017–2020	Santos Laguna	137	(59)
2021–2023	Atlas	77	(23)
2023–2025	Santos	63	(9)
2025	Banfield	7	(0)
- * Club domestic league appearances and goals as of 17:02, 4 December 2025 (UTC)

Julio César Furch (born 29 July 1989) is an Argentine professional footballer who plays as a forward.

== Club career ==
=== Early career ===
Born in Winifreda, La Pampa, Furch started his career with hometown Club Social y Deportivo Winifreda at the age of five. Aged ten, he moved to Club Deportivo Mac Allister, but returned to Deportivo Winifreda at the age of 15.

Furch was promoted to Winifreda's first team in 2006. In 2008, he moved to All Boys de Santa Rosa, scoring once in the year's Torneo Argentino C, but returned to Winifreda to study in a university; he scored ten goals in the year's Liga Cultural for the club, being the competition's top goalscorer.

=== Olimpo ===
In December 2008, Furch was invited on a trial at Olimpo, and signed a contract with the club shortly after. Initially assigned to the reserves which competed in the Liga del Sur, he scored 16 goals in 24 matches before being promoted to the first team by manager Omar De Felippe in May 2010.

Furch made his first team debut for Olimpo on 9 May 2010, coming on as a late substitute for Alejandro Delorte in a 1–0 Primera B Nacional away loss against Independiente Rivadavia, as the club were already promoted. He made his Primera División debut on 8 August, replacing Diego Galván in a 2–1 loss at Banfield.

Furch scored his first professional goal on 24 October 2010, scoring Olimpo's first in a 3–2 away loss to Tigre. He subsequently started to feature regularly for the club, as they suffered relegation in 2012.

==== Loan to San Lorenzo ====
On 20 July 2012, Furch was loaned to San Lorenzo in the top tier. He made his debut for the club on 5 August, replacing Denis Stracqualursi late into a 2–1 home win over San Martín de San Juan, but only featured in nine matches before being deemed surplus to requirements by manager Juan Antonio Pizzi in December.

==== Loan to Arsenal de Sarandí ====
Furch left San Lorenzo in January 2013, and joined Arsenal de Sarandí on loan for six months. He featured more regularly at his new club, and subsequently renewed his loan for a further year in July.

=== Belgrano ===
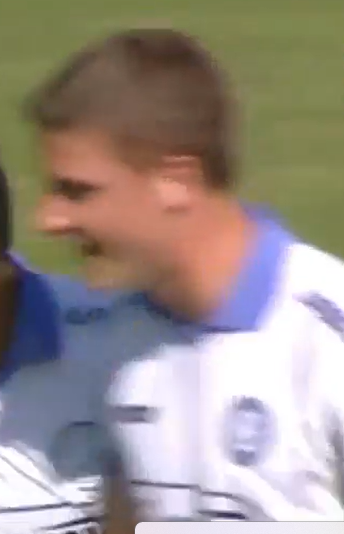
Furch playing for Belgrano in 2014

On 9 August 2014, Furch signed a 18-month deal with Belgrano also in the first division. He immediately became a starter at his new side, scoring a hat-trick against Independiente on 7 December.

=== Veracruz ===
On 28 December 2014, Furch moved abroad for the first time in his career and joined Liga MX side Veracruz. He made his debut abroad the following 17 January, starting and scoring a brace in a 3–1 home win over Puebla.

Furch scored ten goals during his first six months at Veracruz, which included another braces against Atlas and Pumas UNAM. In the 2015–16 season, he played a key role by scoring 12 goals to help the club avoid relegation.

=== Santos Laguna ===
On 24 November 2016, Furch moved to fellow league team Santos Laguna, with Martín Bravo and Fredy Hinestroza moving in the opposite direction. He made his debut for the club the following 7 January, playing the full 90 minutes in a 0–0 away draw against Tigres UANL.

Furch scored his first goal for Santos on 5 February 2017, netting the opener in a 1–1 away draw against Guadalajara. He scored a career-best 18 league goals during the 2017–18 season, and repeated the feat in the following campaign.

On 13 June 2019, Furch renewed his contract with the Guerreros until 2022.

=== Atlas ===
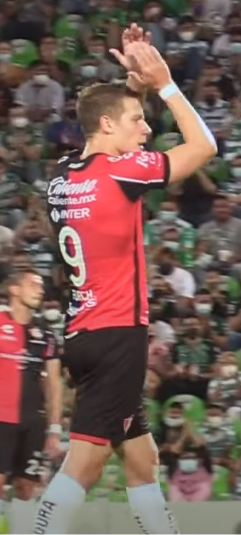
Furch with Atlas in 2021

On 8 December 2020, Furch signed for Atlas of the same league. After suffering a season long injury for the Clausura 2021 season, he became an undisputed starter in the 2021–22 season, scoring 16 goals.

On 14 July 2023, Furch left Atlas, ending an 8-year period in Mexico.

=== Santos ===
On 21 July 2023, Furch signed a two-year contract with Campeonato Brasileiro Série A side Santos. He made his debut for the club eight days later, replacing Lucas Lima late into a 1–0 away loss against Fluminense.

Furch scored his first goal for Peixe on 20 August 2023, netting a last-minute winner in a 2–1 home success over Grêmio. He was regularly used during the 2024 Série B, but was separated from the squad for the 2025 season, and asked to rescind his contract on 4 June of that year.

=== Banfield ===
In July 2025, Furch returned to Argentina to join Banfield, signing as a free agent on a contract until the end of December 2026.

== International career ==
Born in Argentina, Furch expressed interest on representing the Mexico national team in October 2018, saying he would "like to wear" the nation's colours.

== Personal life ==
Furch's great-grandparents fled Germany during the World War II and moved to Argentina in the 20th century. In 2012, he was nicknamed Emperador (the Emperor) by the supporters of Olimpo due to his name being the same as Julius Caesar.

== Career statistics ==
As of 9 August 2025.

Club statistics
Club	Season	League			Cup (Note: Includes Copa Argentina, Copa MX)		Continental		State league (Note: Includes Campeonato Paulista)		Other		Total	
Club	Season	Division	Apps	Goals	Apps	Goals	Apps	Goals	Apps	Goals	Apps	Goals	Apps	Goals
Olimpo	2009–10	Primera B Nacional	2	0	—		—		—		—		2	0
Olimpo	2010–11	Primera División	24	3	—		—		—		—		24	3
Olimpo	2011–12	Primera División	26	4	0	0	—		—		—		26	4
Olimpo	Total		52	7	0	0	—		—		—		52	7
San Lorenzo (loan)	2012–13	Primera División	9	0	0	0	—		—		—		9	0
Arsenal de Sarandí (loan)	2012–13	Primera División	18	4	—		5 (Note: Appearance(s) in Copa Libertadores)	2	—		—		23	6
Arsenal de Sarandí (loan)	2013–14	Primera División	36	10	4	0	9	2	—		1 (Note: Appearance(s) in Supercopa Argentina)	0	50	12
Arsenal de Sarandí (loan)	Total		54	14	4	0	14	4	—		1	0	73	18
Belgrano (loan)	2014	Primera División	18	8	0	0	—		—		—		18	8
Veracruz	2014–15	Liga MX	18	10	—		—		—		—		18	10
Veracruz	2015–16	Liga MX	34	12	6	2	—		—		—		40	14
Veracruz	2016–17	Liga MX	17	6	4	3	—		—		1 (Note: Appearance(s) in Supercopa MX)	0	22	9
Veracruz	Total		69	28	10	5	—		—		1	0	80	33
Santos Laguna	2016–17	Liga MX	19	5	5	3	—		—		—		24	8
Santos Laguna	2017–18	Liga MX	38	18	10	2	—		—		1 (Note: Appearance(s) in Campeón de Campeones)	0	49	20
Santos Laguna	2018–19	Liga MX	33	18	1	0	6 (Note: Appearance(s) in CONCACAF Champions League)	5	—		—		40	23
Santos Laguna	2019–20	Liga MX	29	13	3	0	—		—		—		32	13
Santos Laguna	2020–21	Liga MX	18	5	0	0	—		—		—		18	5
Santos Laguna	Total		137	59	19	5	6	5	—		1	0	163	69
Atlas	2020–21	Liga MX	7	2	0	0	—		—		—		7	2
Atlas	2021–22	Liga MX	42	16	0	0	—		—		0	0	42	16
Atlas	2022–23	Liga MX	29	5	0	0	—		—		5 (Note: Appearance(s) in Campeones Cup)	2	34	7
Atlas	2023–24	Liga MX	2	0	0	0	—		—		—		2	0
Atlas	Total		80	23	0	0	—		—		5	2	85	25
Santos	2023	Série A	22	3	—		—		—		—		22	3
Santos	2024	Série B	28	3	—		—		13	3	—		41	6
Santos	Total		50	6	—		—		13	3	—		63	9
Banfield	2025	Primera División	1	0	0	0	—		—		—		1	0
Career total			469	145	33	10	20	9	13	3	8	2	543	169

== Honours ==
Olimpo

- Primera B Nacional: 2009–10

Arsenal de Sarandi

- Copa Argentina: 2012–13

Veracruz

- Copa MX: Clausura 2016

Santos Laguna

- Liga MX: Clausura 2018

Atlas

- Liga MX: Apertura 2021, Clausura 2022
- Campeón de Campeones: 2022

Santos

- Campeonato Brasileiro Série B: 2024

Individual

- Liga MX Best XI: Clausura 2015, Clausura 2018, Apertura 2018, Apertura 2021
- CONCACAF Champions League Team of the Tournament: 2019
- Liga MX All-Star: 2022
- Liga MX Player of the Month: September 2018
