= Santiago Martínez (footballer, born 1998) =

Colombian footballer

Personal information
- Full name: Santiago Martínez Perlaza
- Date of birth: 27 February 1998 (age 28)
- Place of birth: Medellín, Colombia
- Height: 1.72 m (5 ft 8 in)
- Position: Winger

Team information
- Current team: Gżira United
- Number: 7

Youth career
- La Equidad
- 2016–2018: Santos Laguna

Senior career*
Years	Team	Apps	(Gls)
2018–2019	Santos Laguna	0	(0)
2018–2019	→ Tampico Madero F.C. (loan)	3	(0)
2020–2021	Mosta	5	(0)
2021	→ Naxxar Lions (loan)	2	(1)
2023–2025	Melita	28	(5)
2025–	Gżira United	27	(1)
- * Club domestic league appearances and goals as of 7 May 2026

Santiago Martínez Perlaza (born 27 February 1998) is a Colombian footballer who plays as a winger for Maltese Premier League side Gżira United.
