= Jair Marrufo =

American soccer referee (born 1977)

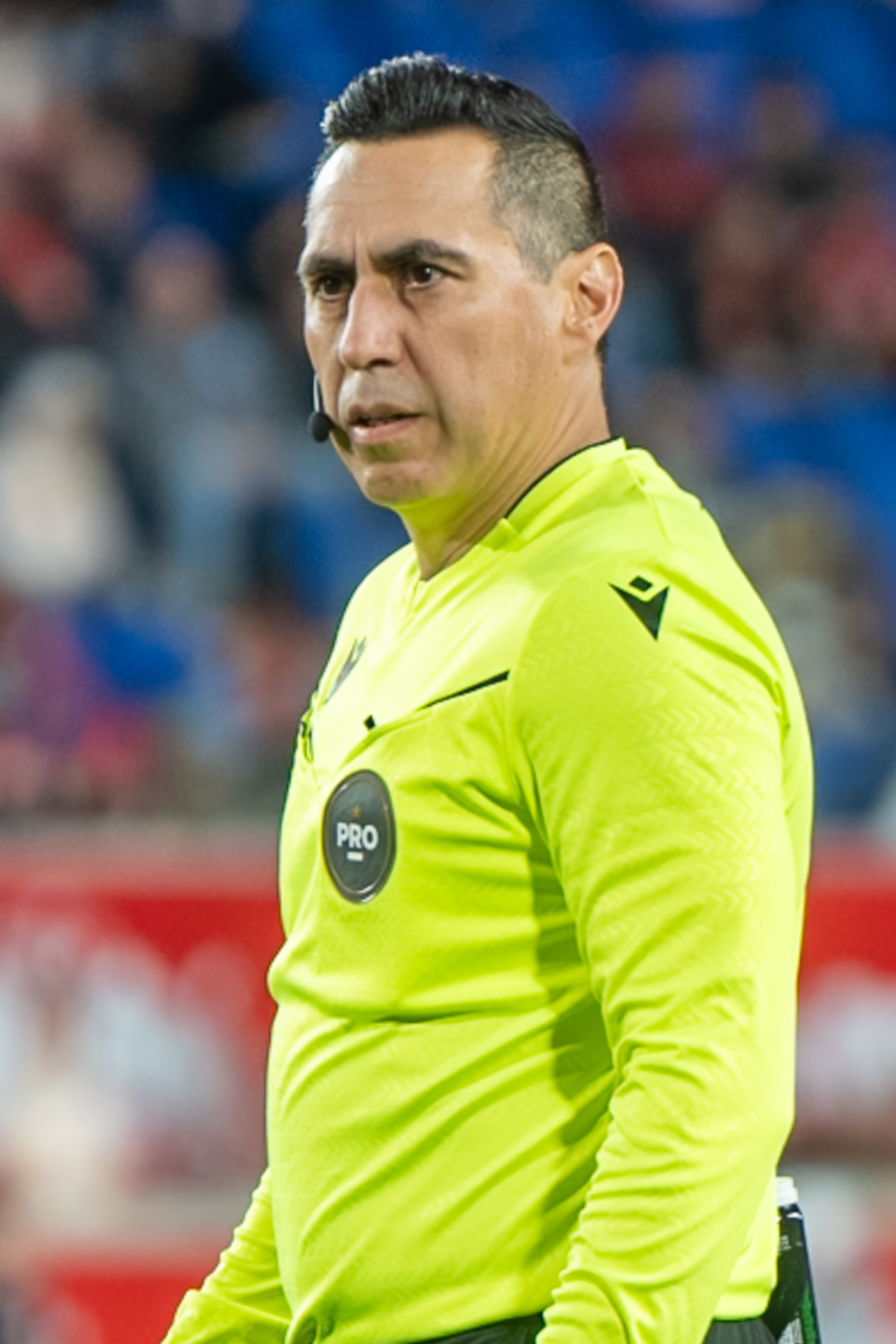
- Marrufo in 2026
- Born: June 7, 1977 (age 49); El Paso, Texas, U.S.
- Other occupation: Product specialist

Domestic
Years	League	Role
2002–	Major League Soccer	Referee

International
Years	League	Role
2007–2022	FIFA listed	Referee
2007–	CONCACAF Champions League	Referee

Jair Marrufo (born June 7, 1977) is an American soccer referee. He has been a referee in Major League Soccer since 2002 and a FIFA referee from 2007 to 2022. He was a referee at the 2018 FIFA World Cup.

== Career ==
Marrufo was 2008 MLS Referee of the Year.

Marrufo was suspended by MLS for the remainder of the 2009 MLS season as of September 1, 2009, for poor performance over the course of the season, and subsequently on February 5, 2010, Marrufo was removed from the 2010 World Cup referee list.

It was announced in 2013 that Marrufo would be a member of the newly formed Professional Referee Organization, the body responsible for refereeing appointments among the United States and Canada's top soccer leagues.

On July 8, 2014, Marrufo was assigned to the 2014 MLS All-Star Game, to be played on August 6 at Providence Park between an MLS All-Star team and Bayern Munich.

He also officiated a 2017 International Champions Cup match between Barcelona and Real Madrid on 29 July 2017, after which he was accused by Barcelona midfielder Ivan Rakitić of insulting him.

Marrufo was selected to officiate in the 2018 FIFA World Cup, and his first appointment was the Group G match between Belgium and Tunisia.

Marrufo refereed the 2018 FIFA Club World Cup final between Real Madrid and Al Ain.

He refereed the second leg of the 2019 CONCACAF Champions League final between Monterrey and Tigres on May 1, 2019.

On May 17, 2019, Marrufo was appointed to be a referee for the 2019 CONCACAF Gold Cup in the United States.

== Personal life ==
His father, Antonio Marrufo, was a FIFA referee from Mexico and served on the Mexican Referee Commission. Jair Marrufo speaks fluent English and Spanish. He is the husband of teacher and UTEP graduate Zinnia Mares Marrufo and they have two children together. He is of Mexican descent.

== Honors ==
- FIFA panel – 2007–2022
- Two Olympic qualifier tournaments
- Beijing Olympics – 2008
- MLS Referee of the Year – 2008
- Two U-17 World Cups
- MLS Cup Playoffs
- Copa Central Americano – 2014
- MLS All-Star Game – 2014
- CONCACAF Gold Cup – 2009, 2011, 2013, 2015
- MLS Cup – 2006, 2015, 2020
- Copa América – 2016
- FIFA World Cup - 2018
- CONCACAF Champions League Final – 2019

== Card statistics ==
Major League Soccer
Season	G	(yellow card) Tot	(yellow card) PG	(red card) Tot	(red card) PG
2013	13	19	1.46	0	0
2014	17	24	1.41	2	0.12
2015	19	53	2.79	3	0.16
2016	17	45	2.65	1	0.06
2017	7	22	3.14	1	0.14

Updated to matches played on July 7, 2017.
Source: http://proreferees.com/stats/referee-stats/

Preceded by (Mexico) César Arturo Ramos	FIFA Club World Cup final referee 2018	Succeeded by (Qatar) Abdulrahman Al-Jassim
