= Jefferson Murillo =

Colombian footballer (born 1992)

Personal information
- Full name: Jefferson Eulises Murillo Aguilar
- Date of birth: 18 January 1992 (age 34)
- Place of birth: Palmira, Colombia
- Height: 1.71 m (5 ft 7 in)
- Position: Left back

Team information
- Current team: América de Cali
- Number: 25

Youth career
- Deportivo Cali

Senior career*
Years	Team	Apps	(Gls)
2011–2014	Deportivo Cali	40	(1)
2014	→ Uniautónoma (loan)	6	(0)
2015–2016	Cúcuta Deportivo	44	(1)
2017–2019	Veracruz	38	(0)
2019–	América de Cali	10	(0)
- * Club domestic league appearances and goals as of 16 June 2020

Jefferson Eulises Murillo Aguilar (born 18 January 1992) is a Colombian professional footballer who plays as a left back for América de Cali.

== Club career ==
Born in Palmira, Valle del Cauca, Murillo was a Deportivo Cali youth graduate. He made his professional debut on 20 March 2011, starting in a 1–1 away draw against Real Cartagena for the Categoría Primera A championship.

Murillo scored his first senior goal on 27 May 2012, netting the last of a 3–0 home win against La Equidad. Ahead of the 2014 season, after falling down the pecking order, he was loaned to newcomers Uniautónoma for six months, but also featured rarely.

In January 2015, Murillo signed for Cúcuta Deportivo, becoming a regular starter for the side but suffering relegation. On 12 December 2016, he moved abroad for the first time in his career and joined Liga MX side Veracruz.

On 13 September 2019, Murillo returned to his home country and agreed to a contract with América de Cali.

== Career statistics ==
As of 28 June 2020

Club	Season	League			Cup		Continental		Other		Total	
Club	Season	Division	Apps	Goals	Apps	Goals	Apps	Goals	Apps	Goals	Apps	Goals
Deportivo Cali	2011	Primera A	16	0	7	0	—		—		23	0
Deportivo Cali	2012	Primera A	17	1	7	0	—		—		24	1
Deportivo Cali	2013	Primera A	7	0	10	0	—		—		17	0
Deportivo Cali	Subtotal		40	1	24	0	—		—		64	1
Uniautónoma	2014	Primera A	6	0	—		—		—		6	0
Cúcuta Deportivo	2015	Primera A	32	1	5	0	—		—		37	1
Cúcuta Deportivo	2016	Primera B	12	0	—		—		—		12	0
Cúcuta Deportivo	Subtotal		44	1	5	0	—		—		49	1
Veracruz	2016–17	Liga MX	4	0	4	0	—		—		8	0
Veracruz	2017–18	Liga MX	15	0	4	0	—		—		19	0
Veracruz	2018–19	Liga MX	19	0	7	0	—		—		26	0
Veracruz	Subtotal		38	0	15	0	—		—		53	0
América de Cali	2019	Primera A	10	0	—		—		—		10	0
América de Cali	2020	Primera A	0	0	0	0	0	0	—		0	0
América de Cali	Subtotal		10	0	0	0	0	0	—		10	0
Total			138	0	44	0	0	0	0	0	182	0

== Honours ==
América de Cali

- Categoría Primera A: 2019 Clausura
