= Deinner Quiñones =

Colombian footballer (born 1995)

Personal information
- Full name: Deinner Alexander Quiñones Quiñones
- Date of birth: 16 August 1995 (age 31)
- Place of birth: Tumaco, Colombia
- Height: 1.71 m (5 ft 7 1/2 in)
- Position: Winger

Team information
- Current team: Once Caldas
- Number: 70

Youth career
- 2016–2023: Hapoel Be'er Sheva

Senior career*
Years	Team	Apps	(Gls)
2013	Universitario Popayán	13	(1)
2013–2018	Deportes Quindío	93	(11)
2016–2017	→ Deportes Tolima	31	(1)
2018	→ Jaguares de Córdoba	14	(0)
2018–2020	Independiente Medellín	17	(1)
2018–2019	→ Santos Laguna	17	(1)
2020–2023	Atlético Nacional	21	(1)
2021–2023	→ América de Cali	56	(5)
2023–2024	Independiente Medellín	29	(2)
2024	Hapoel Be'er Sheva	10	(1)
2024	Maccabi Petah Tikva	5	(0)
2025	Deportivo Pasto	17	(1)
2025–	Once Caldas	13	(0)

International career^{‡}
2015	Colombia U-20	7	(0)
- * Club domestic league appearances and goals as of 12 December 2025 ‡ National team caps and goals as of 5 February 2024

Deinner Alexander Quiñones Quiñones (born August 16, 1995), is a Colombian professional footballer who plays as a midfielder for Once Caldas.

== Career statistics ==
As of 7 March 2019

Appearances and goals by club, season and competition
Club	Season	League			Cup		League Cup		Other		Total	
Club	Season	Division	Apps	Goals	Apps	Goals	Apps	Goals	Apps	Goals	Apps	Goals
Universitario Popayán	2013	Categoría Primera B	13	1	7	3	0	0	0	0	20	4
Deportes Quindío	2013	Categoría Primera A	8	0	2	0	0	0	0	0	10	0
Deportes Quindío	2014	Categoría Primera B	29	1	7	1	0	0	2 (Note: Appearance(s) in the Play-offs 1/2)	0	36	2
Deportes Quindío	2015	Categoría Primera B	20	7	2	0	0	0	0	0	22	7
Deportes Quindío	2017	Categoría Primera B	34	3	1	0	0	0	0	0	35	3
Deportes Quindío	Total		91	11	12	1	0	0	2	0	105	12
Deportes Tolima (loan)	2016	Categoría Primera A	31	1	7	0	0	0	0	0	38	1
Jaguares de Córdoba (loan)	2018	Categoría Primera A	14	0	0	0	0	0	2 (Note: Appearance(s) in the Copa Sudamericana)	0	16	0
Independiente Medellín	2018	Categoría Primera A	1	0	0	0	0	0	0	0	1	0
Santos Laguna (loan)	2018–19	Liga MX	11	1	1	0	0	0	3 (Note: Appearance(s) in the CONCACAF Champions League)	0	15	1
Career totals			161	14	27	4	0	0	7	0	195	18
