= Dória =

Brazilian footballer (born 1994)

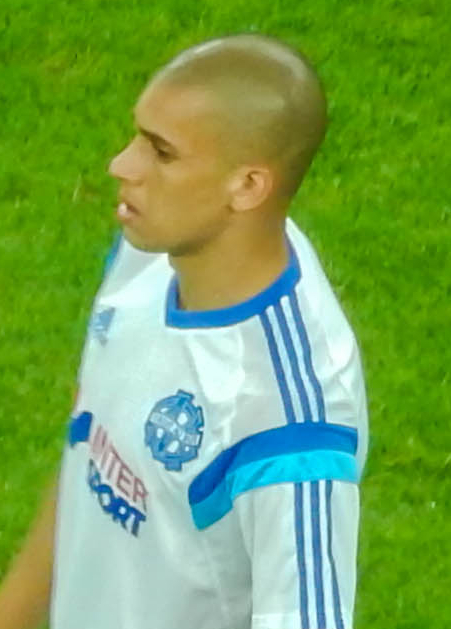
- Dória in 2014

Personal information
- Full name: Matheus Dória Macedo
- Date of birth: 8 November 1994 (age 32)
- Place of birth: São Gonçalo, Brazil
- Height: 1.89 m (6 ft 2 in)
- Position: Centre-back

Team information
- Current team: Batman Petrolspor
- Number: 21

Youth career
- 2009–2012: Botafogo

Senior career*
Years	Team	Apps	(Gls)
2012–2014	Botafogo	77	(4)
2014–2015	Marseille B	8	(1)
2014–2018	Marseille	26	(1)
2015	→ São Paulo (loan)	14	(2)
2015–2016	→ Granada (loan)	8	(0)
2018	→ Yeni Malatyaspor (loan)	9	(1)
2018–2024	Santos Laguna	177	(13)
2024–2025	Atlas	45	(3)
2026	São Paulo	6	(1)
2026–	Batman Petrolspor	11	(2)

International career^{‡}
2013–2014	Brazil U20	11	(1)
2015–2016	Brazil U23	5	(0)
2013	Brazil	1	(0)
- * Club domestic league appearances and goals as of 18 October 2026 ‡ National team caps and goals as of 15 November 2014

Matheus Dória Macedo (born 8 November 1994), commonly known as Dória, is a Brazilian professional footballer who plays as a centre-back for Turkish TFF 1. Lig club Batman Petrolspor.

== Club career ==
=== Botafogo ===
Born in São Gonçalo, Rio de Janeiro, Dória joined Botafogo's youth setup in 2009 at the age of 14. Promoted to the first team due to the injury of Brinner in January 2012, he made his professional – and Série A – debut on 27 May of that year, starting in a 3–2 away win over Coritiba.

On 27 October Dória scored his first professional goal, scoring the first in a 4–0 home routing of Atlético Goianiense. He finished his first professional season with 20 appearances, as his side finished seventh.

In the 2013 campaign, Dória was an undisputed starter for Bota, appearing in 30 league matches and scoring one goal as his side qualified to Copa Libertadores after a 17-year absence.

=== Marseille ===
On 1 September 2014 Dória signed a five-year deal with Olympique de Marseille for a reported fee of €7 million. He failed to make a first-team appearance following his arrival, being subsequently assigned to the reserves in Championnat de France amateur.

==== Loans to São Paulo and Granada ====
On 6 February 2015 Dória joined São Paulo FC, on loan until June. After appearing regularly, he moved to La Liga side Granada CF on 31 August, also in a temporary deal.

== International career ==
Dória made his debut for Brazil on 6 April 2013, coming on as an 87th-minute substitute in a 4–0 win over Bolivia.

In June 2013, he was called to the Brazil U20 team as captain of the team who won the 2013 Toulon Tournament.

== Career statistics ==
=== Club ===
As of match played 8 November 2025

Appearances and goals by club, season and competition
Club	Season	League			State league		National cup		Continental		Other		Total	
Club	Season	Division	Apps	Goals	Apps	Goals	Apps	Goals	Apps	Goals	Apps	Goals	Apps	Goals
Botafogo	2012	Série A	18	1	0	0	0	0	0	0	—		18	1
Botafogo	2013	Série A	30	1	3 (Note: Appearance(s) in Campeonato Carioca)	2	4	1	—		—		37	4
Botafogo	2014	Série A	10	0	1	0	0	0	8 (Note: Appearance(s) in Copa Libertadores)	0	—		19	0
Botafogo	Total		58	2	4	2	4	1	8	0	—		74	5
Marseille	2014–15	Ligue 1	0	0	—		0	0	—		0	0	0	0
Marseille	2015–16	Ligue 1	0	0	—		0	0	0	0	0	0	0	0
Marseille	2016–17	Ligue 1	23	1	—		3	1	—		2 (Note: Appearance(s) in Coupe de la Ligue)	0	28	2
Marseille	2017–18	Ligue 1	3	0	—		0	0	2 (Note: Appearance(s) in UEFA Europa League)	0	0	0	5	0
Marseille	Total		26	1	—		3	1	2	0	2	0	33	2
São Paulo (loan)	2015	Série A	9	1	1 (Note: Appearance(s) in Campeonato Paulista)	1	0	0	4	0	—		14	2
Granada (loan)	2015–16	La Liga	8	0	—		2	0	—		—		10	0
Yeni Malatyaspor (loan)	2017–18	Süper Lig	9	1	—		—		—		—		9	1
Santos Laguna	2018–19	Liga MX	31	2	—		1	0	4 (Note: Appearance(s) in CONCACAF Champions Cup)	1	—		36	3
Santos Laguna	2019–20	Liga MX	26	4	—		2	1	—		—		28	5
Santos Laguna	2020–21	Liga MX	41	3	—		—		—		2 (Note: Appearance(s) in Leagues Cup)	0	43	3
Santos Laguna	2021–22	Liga MX	34	2	—		—		1	0	4 (Note: Appearance(s) in Copa por México)	0	39	2
Santos Laguna	2022–23	Liga MX	21	2	—		—		—		2	0	23	2
Santos Laguna	2023–24	Liga MX	24	0	—		—		—		—		24	0
Santos Laguna	Total		177	13	—		3	1	5	1	8	0	193	15
Atlas	2024–25	Liga MX	32	2	—		—		—		2	0	34	2
Atlas	2025–26	Liga MX	13	1	—		—		—		2	0	15	1
Atlas	Total		45	3	—		—		—		4	0	49	3
Career total			332	21	5	3	12	3	19	1	14	0	382	28

=== International ===
Appearances and goals by national team and year
National team	Year	Apps	Goals
Brazil	2013	1	0
Total		1	0

== Honours ==
Botafogo

- Campeonato Carioca: 2013

Brazil U20

- Toulon Tournament: 2013, 2014

Individual

- Liga MX Best XI: Guardianes 2021
- Liga MX Best Defender: 2020–21
- Liga MX All-Star: 2021, 2022
