= Once Hermanos =

Mexican football club

- Full name: Club Once Hermanos
- Nickname(s): Hermanos (Brothers)
- Ground: Campo Huimanguillo, Huimanguillo, Tabasco
- Chairman: Carlos Armando Lezama
- Manager: Pedro Osorio
- League: Tercera División de México
Home colours	Away colours

Club Once Hermanos is a Mexican football club that plays in the Tercera División de México. The club is based in Huimanguillo, Tabasco.The clubs takes its name after the Brothers that played for club Necaxa In the 1930s

== See also ==
- Football in Mexico
- Tabasco
- Necaxa
- Tercera División de México
