= Nicolás Sánchez (footballer, born 1986) =

Argentine footballer

Personal information
- Full name: Nicolás Gabriel Sánchez
- Date of birth: 4 February 1986 (age 40)
- Place of birth: Buenos Aires, Argentina
- Height: 1.85 m (6 ft 1 in)
- Position: Centre back

Team information
- Current team: Monterrey U21 (Manager)

Youth career
- Boca Juniors
- Nueva Chicago

Senior career*
Years	Team	Apps	(Gls)
2003–2007	Nueva Chicago	98	(4)
2007–2010	River Plate	58	(0)
2010–2014	Godoy Cruz	118	(5)
2014–2016	Racing Club	56	(3)
2017–2021	Monterrey	137	(31)
2021	Godoy Cruz	4	(0)

Managerial career
- 2022–2023: Raya2
- 2023–2026: Monterrey (assistant)
- 2024: Monterrey (interim)
- 2026: Monterrey (interim)
- 2026–: Monterrey Reserves and Academy
- * Club domestic league appearances and goals

Nicolás Gabriel Sánchez (born 4 February 1986) is an Argentine football manager and former professional footballer who played as a centre-back.

== Career ==
Born in the Mataderos neighborhood of Buenos Aires, Sánchez began playing football as a midfielder in Boca Juniors' youth system. He became a professional with Nueva Chicago, with whom he made his debut in the 2003–04 Argentine Primera División, on 26 June 2004 against Independente. Nueva Chicago was relegated soon after, and Sánchez continued to be part of the club's first team during the next two seasons in the Primera B Nacional. In early 2006, Nueva Chicago's manager Rodolfo Motta converted Sánchez to a centre back following an injury to the club's regular defender, and within six months the club was promoted to the Primera División for the 2006–07 season.

After Nueva Chicago was relegated again at the end of the 2006–07 season, Sánchez joined rivals River Plate for the 2007–08 season. River Plate would win the Clausura 2008 during his tenure with the club. However, Sánchez struggled with injuries, missing almost a year with a broken bone in his foot, and in 2010, after River Plate re-appointed manager, Ángel Cappa, and Sánchez left the club for Godoy Cruz on a free transfer.

Sánchez spent the next four seasons with Godoy Cruz. The club achieved mid-table finishes, and Sánchez participated in the Copa Libertadores twice.

Racing Club's manager Diego Cocca signed Sánchez on 1 July 2014. Racing had narrowly avoided relegation in the prior season, and Sánchez would become a key part of Racing's defense as the club bounced back to win the Primera División title.

== Honours ==
River Plate

- Argentine Primera División: 2008 Clausura

Racing Club

- Argentine Primera División: 2014 Primera

Monterrey

- Liga MX: Apertura 2019
- Copa MX: Apertura 2017, 2019–20
- CONCACAF Champions League: 2019, 2021

Individual

- Liga MX Best XI: Apertura 2017, Apertura 2019
- CONCACAF Champions League Golden Ball: 2019
- CONCACAF Champions League Team of the Tournament: 2019
