= Javier Correa (footballer) =

Argentine footballer

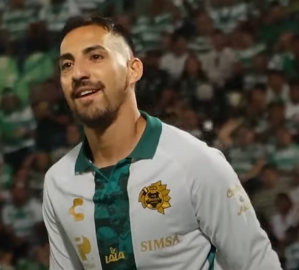
- Correa with Santos Laguna in 2023

Personal information
- Full name: Javier Marcelo Correa
- Date of birth: 23 October 1992 (age 34)
- Place of birth: Córdoba, Argentina
- Height: 1.84 m (6 ft 1/2 in)
- Position: Forward

Team information
- Current team: Colo-Colo
- Number: 9

Youth career
- Instituto

Senior career*
Years	Team	Apps	(Gls)
2009–2012	Instituto	11	(0)
2012	General Paz Juniors	13	(2)
2013	Ferro Carril Oeste	35	(9)
2014	Olimpia	5	(0)
2014	Rosario Central	3	(0)
2015–2018	Godoy Cruz	43	(13)
2018	Colón	25	(11)
2019–2023	Santos Laguna	68	(17)
2019–2021	→ Atlas (loan)	49	(4)
2021–2022	→ Racing Club (loan)	33	(10)
2024	Estudiantes	21	(5)
2024–	Colo-Colo	54	(34)
- * Club domestic league appearances and goals as of 31 October 2026

Javier Marcelo Correa (born 23 October 1992) is an Argentine professional footballer who plays as a forward for Chilean Primera División club Colo-Colo.

== Career ==
In the second half of 2024, Correa moved to Chile and signed with Colo-Colo.

== Career statistics ==
=== Club ===
As of 13 September 2017

Club	Season	League		Cup		Continental		Other^{1}		Total	
Club	Season	Apps	Goals	Apps	Goals	Apps	Goals	Apps	Goals	Apps	Goals
Instituto	2009–10	10	0	—						10	0
Instituto	2010–11	1	0	—						1	0
Instituto	2011–12	0	0	0	0	—				0	0
Instituto	Total	11	0	0	0	0	0	0	0	11	0
General Paz Juniors	2012	13	2	—						13	2
Ferro Carril Oeste	2012–13	18	4	—						18	4
Ferro Carril Oeste	2013–14	17	5	—						17	5
Ferro Carril Oeste	Total	35	9	0	0	0	0	0	0	35	9
Club Olimpia	2014	5	0	—						5	0
Rosario Central	2014	3	0	2	1	—				5	1
Godoy Cruz	2015	6	0	1	0	—				7	0
Godoy Cruz	2016	10	2	—						10	2
Godoy Cruz	2016–17	19	2	2	0	—				21	2
Godoy Cruz	2017–18	2	0	2	1	7	3	—		11	4
Godoy Cruz	Total	37	4	5	1	7	3	0	0	49	8
Total		104	15	7	2	7	3	0	0	118	20

== Honours ==
Estudiantes

- Copa de la Liga Profesional: 2024
