= José Abella =

Mexican footballer (born 1994)

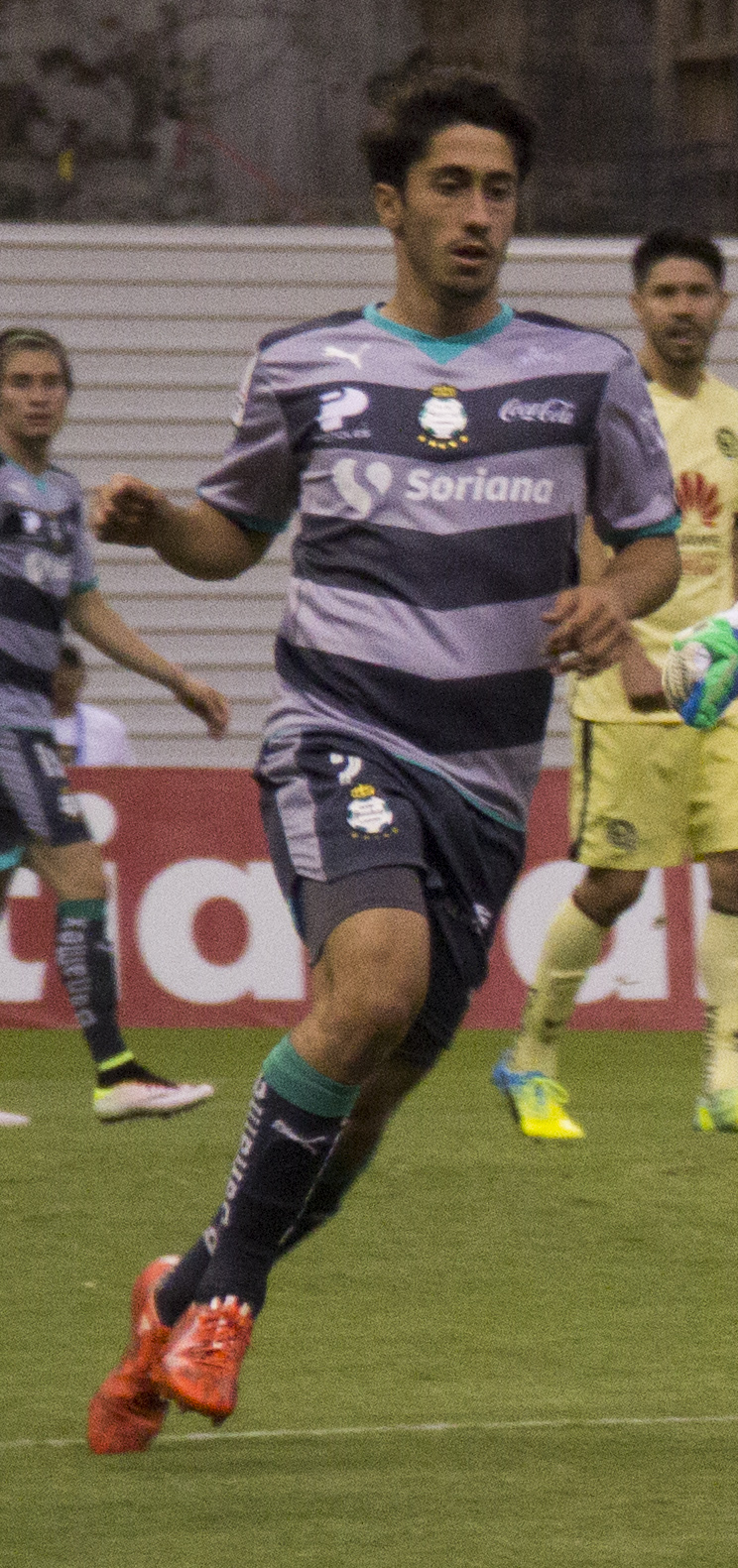
- Abella with Santos Laguna in 2016

Personal information
- Full name: José Javier Abella Fanjul
- Date of birth: February 10, 1994 (age 32)
- Place of birth: Córdoba, Veracruz, Mexico
- Height: 1.75 m (5 ft 9 in)
- Position: Right-back

Team information
- Current team: Santos Laguna
- Number: 4

Youth career
- 2008–2013: Santos Laguna

Senior career*
Years	Team	Apps	(Gls)
2013–2020	Santos Laguna	193	(3)
2020–2023	Atlas	93	(1)
2024	Juárez	29	(0)
2025–	Santos Laguna	47	(0)

International career^{‡}
2013	Mexico U20	8	(3)
2014	Mexico U21	3	(0)
2015–2016	Mexico U23	7	(0)
2018	Mexico	1	(0)
Medal record
Representing Mexico
Men's football
First place	CONCACAF U-20 Championship	2013 Mexico
Pan American Games
Silver medal – second place	2015 Toronto	Team
- * Club domestic league appearances and goals as of 1 November 2026 ‡ National team caps and goals as of 12 September 2018

José Javier Abella Fanjul (born 10 February 1994) is a Mexican professional footballer who plays as a right-back for Liga MX club Santos Laguna.

== Club career ==
Abella made his Liga MX debut with Santos Laguna 26 July 2013 in a 3–2 home game win against Cruz Azul.

On1 12 December 2019, Abella joined Atlas on loan.

On 8 January 2024, Abella joined Juárez for the Clausura 2024.

== International career ==
In early 2018, media sources claimed Abella could have possibly represented the Lebanon national team if he was not to be called by Mexico.

In September 2018, Abella was called up by Mexico head coach Ricardo Ferretti for two friendly matches against Uruguay and the United States. On 11 September 2018, he made his senior debut against the United States, where Mexico lost 0–1.

== Personal life ==
Abella and Mexican international footballer Miguel Layún are second cousins, as their grandmothers are sisters.

== Career statistics ==
=== Club ===
As of 1 November 2026

Appearances and goals by club, season and competition
Club	Season	League			Cup		Continental		Other		Total	
Club	Season	Division	Apps	Goals	Apps	Goals	Apps	Goals	Apps	Goals	Apps	Goals
Santos Laguna	2012–13	Liga MX	—		—		1 (Note: Appearances in CONCACAF Champions League)	0	—		1	0
Santos Laguna	2013–14	Liga MX	40	2	4	0	7 (Note: Appearances in Copa Libertadores)	1	—		51	3
Santos Laguna	2014–15	Liga MX	40	0	9	0	—		—		49	0
Santos Laguna	2015–16	Liga MX	30	1	—		8	0	—		38	1
Santos Laguna	2016–17	Liga MX	13	0	5	0	—		—		18	0
Santos Laguna	2017–18	Liga MX	33	0	8 (Note: Includes one appearance in Campeón de Campeones in 2018 and another in 2022)	0	—		—		41	0
Santos Laguna	2018–19	Liga MX	34	0	—		6	1	—		40	1
Santos Laguna	2019–20	Liga MX	3	0	4	0	—		—		7	0
Santos Laguna	Total		193	3	30	0	22	2	—		245	5
Atlas	2019–20	Liga MX	8	1	2	0	—		—		10	1
Atlas	2020–21	Liga MX	18	0	—		—		—		18	0
Atlas	2021–22	Liga MX	20	0	—		—		—		20	0
Atlas	2022–23	Liga MX	30	0	4 (Note: Appearances in Copa Sky por México)	0	—		1 (Note: Appearances in Leagues Cup)	0	35	0
Atlas	2023–24	Liga MX	17	0	—		3	0	3	0	23	0
Atlas	Total		93	1	6	0	3	0	4	0	106	1
Juárez	2023–24	Liga MX	12	0	—		—		—		12	0
Juárez	2024–25	Liga MX	17	0	—		—		3	0	20	0
Juárez	Total		29	0	—		—		3	0	32	0
Santos Laguna	2024–25	Liga MX	17	0	—		—		—		17	0
Santos Laguna	2025–26	Liga MX	27	0	—		—		2	0	29	0
Santos Laguna	2026–27	Liga MX	3	0	—		—		3	0	6	0
Santos Laguna	Total		47	0	—		—		5	0	52	0
Career total			362	4	36	0	25	2	12	0	435	6

=== International ===
As of match played on 12 September 2018

National team	Year	Apps	Goals
Mexico	2018	1	0
Total		1	0

== Honours ==
Santos Laguna

- Liga MX: Clausura 2015, Clausura 2018
- Copa MX: Apertura 2014

Atlas

- Liga MX: Apertura 2021, Clausura 2022
- Campeón de Campeones: 2022

Mexico Youth

- CONCACAF U-20 Championship: 2013
- Pan American Silver Medal: 2015

Individual

- Toulon Tournament top scorer: 2013
