= Ulises Rivas =

Mexican footballer (born 1996)

Personal information
- Full name: Ulises Rivas Gilio
- Date of birth: 25 January 1996 (age 30)
- Place of birth: Torreón, Coahuila, Mexico
- Height: 1.76 m (5 ft 9 1/2 in)
- Position: Defensive midfielder

Youth career
- 2009–2014: Santos Laguna

Senior career*
Years	Team	Apps	(Gls)
2015–2022	Santos Laguna	106	(3)
2023–2026	UNAM	85	(9)

International career
2013	Mexico U17	12	(1)
2016	Mexico U23	2	(0)
Medal record
Men's football
Representing Mexico
FIFA U-17 World Cup
Runner-up	2013 United Arab Emirates	Team
CONCACAF U-17 Championship
Winner	2013 Panama	Team
- * Club domestic league appearances and goals as of 16 May 2024

Ulises Rivas Gilio (born 25 January 1996) is a Mexican professional footballer who plays as a defensive midfielder.

== Club career ==
From 2009 to 2011, Rivas played for the Under 15 Club Santos Laguna, got a goal in 10 games. For the second half of 2011 became part of the Under 17 team where he played 32 games and scored one goal for two seasons. In 2013, he went to the sub 20. On November 30, 2013, Santos defeated the visitors by a score of 0–1 to Club León in León Stadium and so Apertura 2013 tournament champion was crowned U20.

On April 10, 2014, he debuted with the first team in the Copa Libertadores in the game finalized the group stage against Arsenal Football Club, the result was 3-0 for the Argentine team. 19 August 2014 debuted in Copa Mexico along with four other players from the basic forces of Santos, in the home win against Santos Correcaminos UAT by a score of 3–0, Rivas played the whole game. He debuted in first division the January 9, 2015, during the first day of the Clausura.

== International career ==
=== Mexico U-15 ===
In October 2011 AGS Cup Participated in where the Mexican team was champion.

=== Mexico U-17 ===
In June 2012 he was selected to the Copa Saprissa Internaciona 17 where he was champion when winning by 3–1 to the US. In August played the Toyota Cup where the team was champion by defeating Japan by a score 6–2. In October he participated in the AGS Cup where the team won the title for the second year; Rivas was named the best player of the tournament.

He played in the 2013 CONCACAF U-17 Championship, played every game of the tournament, four starts and one of change. Mexico beat Cuba (1:5) and Honduras (2:0) in the group stage, quarter-final defeat to Guatemala (2:0), in the semifinals of new account will beat Honduras (1:3) and in the final he defeated the hosts of the tournament, Panamá. He was selected to participate in the World Cup U17 2013 held in the United Arab States. Scored his only goal of the competition on October 22 against Iraq. He was captain of the Under 17 team throughout the world. Mexico finished second in their group, resulting from a loss to Nigeria (1: 6), and two victories against Iraq (3:1) and Sweden (0:1). In the second round they defeated Italy (0:2), quartered beat Brazil on penalties (10:11), after tying to a goal in regulation in the semifinals defeated Argentina (0:3). In the final they met again into Nigeria, losing this time by 3–0.

== Honours ==
Santos Laguna

- Liga MX: Clausura 2015, Clausura 2018
- Campeon de Campeones: 2015

Mexico U17

- CONCACAF U-17 Championship: 2013
- FIFA U-17 World Cup runner-up: 2013
