= 2026 CONCACAF Champions Cup final =

International football match in Toluca, Mexico

- Match programme cover
- Event: 2026 CONCACAF Champions Cup
Toluca	Tigres UANL
(Mexico)	(Mexico)
1	1
- After extra time Toluca won 6–5 on penalties
- Date: 30 May 2026
- Venue: Nemesio Diez Stadium, Toluca
- Man of the Match: Luis García (Toluca)
- Referee: Ismail Elfath (United States)

The 2026 CONCACAF Champions Cup final was the deciding match of the 2026 CONCACAF Champions Cup, the 61st edition of CONCACAF's premier club association football tournament in North America, Central America, and the Caribbean. The final was contested between Liga MX clubs Toluca FC and Tigres UANL on 30 May 2026, at Nemesio Diez Stadium in the city of Toluca, with the hosts having earned the right to stage the match by virtue of a superior goal difference in the earlier rounds. The two clubs had previously met months earlier in the Apertura 2025 Liga MX final, where Toluca defeated Tigres on penalties.

The match ended goalless after regular time, with both sides evenly matched in the first half before Tigres adopted a more aggressive approach in the second. Extra time saw Toluca take the lead before Tigres equalized to make it 1–1, with goalkeeper Luis García making several key saves to deny Tigres throughout the game. Toluca ultimately won 6–5 on penalties, earning direct qualification to the 2026 FIFA Intercontinental Cup and the 2029 FIFA Club World Cup, both for the first time in the club's history. García was named Player of the Match in recognition of his performance.

== Background ==
The 2026 CONCACAF Champions Cup was the 61st edition of CONCACAF's premier club football tournament, featuring clubs from across North America, Central America, and the Caribbean, held from February to May 2026. Toluca qualified by winning the 2024–25 Liga MX season, while Tigres UANL qualified based on their regular season standings. Mexican club Cruz Azul were the defending champions of the previous 2025 CONCACAF Champions Cup, where they defeated Vancouver Whitecaps FC in a 5–0 landslide win in the final.

Prior to the match, Toluca and Tigres had met 73 times across Liga MX and Copa MX competition, with Toluca holding 34 victories to Tigres's 20, and 19 draws. The final marked the first occasion the two clubs had met in CONCACAF competition. Of those matches played at Nemesio Diez Stadium, Toluca held a record of 29 wins to Tigres's nine, with eleven draws. Toluca and Tigres had most recently faced each other in the Apertura 2025 Liga MX final, drawing 2–2 on aggregate before Toluca prevailed 9–8 on penalties in sudden death. Toluca had also won the preceding Clausura 2025, and over the last twelve months had claimed two Liga MX titles, the 2025 Campeón de Campeones, and the 2025 Campeones Cup.

Toluca was making their fifth appearance in a CONCACAF Champions Cup final. The club had won the competition twice, in 1968 and 2003. Tigres was making their fifth appearance in a Champions Cup final. They had won the title once, in 2020. This marked the first final since 2021 where the match was played exclusively by Mexican clubs.

In early May 2026, Toluca was eliminated from the Clausura 2026 Liga MX playoffs, falling to Pachuca in the quarter-finals and ending their bid for a third consecutive league title. Toluca head coach Antonio Mohamed had opted to field several reserve players against Pachuca, prioritizing the CONCACAF Champions Cup. Tigres was eliminated by Guadalajara in the quarter-finals as well. Ahead of the match with Tigres, Mohamed was without Alexis Vega and Jesús Gallardo, both of whom had been called up to the Mexico national team on 6 May 2026, in preparation for the 2026 FIFA World Cup. On the same day as the final, Mexico played a friendly match against Australia, with Vega as a starting forward.

=== Previous finals ===
Team	Previous final appearances (bold indicates winners)	Source(s)
(Mexico) Toluca	5 (**1968**, 1998, **2003**, 2006, 2014)	
(Mexico) Tigres UANL	4 (2016, 2017, 2019, **2020**)	

== Venue ==
=== Host selection ===
Under CONCACAF regulations, the finalist with the superior record across the round of 16 through the semi-finals, excluding the first round, would host the final in a single-leg match rather than a home-and-away tie. This change was made in the 2024 CONCACAF Champions Cup edition. Both Toluca and Tigres finished the elimination rounds of this 2026 tournament with four wins and two draws, but Toluca's superior goal difference of +11 against Tigres's +3 earned them the right to host the final at Nemesio Diez Stadium.

The away goals rule did not apply in the final; in the event of an aggregate tie, the rules stipulated that the match would proceed to extra time and, if necessary, a penalty shoot-out. The away goals rule did apply, however, during the earlier rounds of the tournament.

The date of the final was confirmed on 7 May and scheduled for 30 May at 18:00 local time.

Pos	Team	Pld	W	D	L	GF	GA	GD	Pts	Final
1	(Mexico) Toluca (H)	6	4	0	2	18	7	+11	12	Host
2	(Mexico) Tigres UANL	6	4	0	2	10	7	+3	12	

Source: CONCACAF
Rules for classification: 1) Points; 2) Goal difference; 3) Goals scored; 4) Away goals scored; 5) Wins; 6) Away wins; 7) Disciplinary points; 8) Drawing of lots.
(H) Hosts

== Road to the final ==
Toluca received a bye to the round of 16 by virtue of winning the Liga MX season, exempting them from the first round. Tigres, by contrast, competed in the first round against Canadian club Forge FC over two legs, drawing 0–0 at Hamilton Stadium before winning 4–1 at Estadio Universitario. In the round of 16, Toluca faced San Diego FC, losing the away leg 2–3 at Snapdragon Stadium before winning 4–0 at Nemesio Diez Stadium to advance 6–3 on aggregate. Tigres faced FC Cincinnati, losing 0–3 away at TQL Stadium before winning 5–1 at Estadio Universitario, with a late goal proving decisive in securing their progression, as Cincinnati were set to advance on away goals until Tigres scored a late fifth goal to win 5–4 on aggregate.

In the quarterfinals, Toluca defeated LA Galaxy 4–2 at home before winning 3–0 away at Dignity Health Sports Park, advancing 7–2 on aggregate. Tigres defeated Seattle Sounders FC 2–0 at home before losing 1–3 away at Lumen Field, tying 3–3 on aggregate but advancing on away goals. In the semi-finals, Toluca lost the away leg 1–2 against Los Angeles FC at BMO Stadium before winning 4–0 at home to advance 5–2 on aggregate. Tigres defeated Nashville SC 0–1 at Geodis Park before winning 1–0 at home to advance 2–0 on aggregate.

Note: The table below includes the game results cited above. In all results, the score of the finalist is given first (H: Home; A: Away)

(Mexico) Toluca				Round	(Mexico) Tigres UANL			
Opponent	Agg.	1st leg	2nd leg	Stages	Opponent	Agg.	1st leg	2nd leg
Bye				Round one	(Canada) Forge FC	4–1	0–0 (A)	4–1 (H)
(United States) San Diego FC	6–3	2–3 (A)	4–0 (H)	Round of 16	(United States) FC Cincinnati	5–4	0–3 (A)	5–1 (H)
(United States) LA Galaxy	7–2	4–2 (H)	3–0 (A)	Quarter-finals	(United States) Seattle Sounders FC	3–3 (a)	2–0 (H)	1–3 (A)
(United States) Los Angeles FC	5–2	1–2 (A)	4–0 (H)	Semi-finals	(United States) Nashville SC	2–0	1–0 (A)	1–0 (H)

== Pre-match ==
=== Days prior to match ===
On 26 May, Toluca supporters set up a light projection of the team's logo at night on Cerro de la Teresona, a hill in Toluca. Images of the projection spread through social media, where the practice was dubbed the Diabloseñal ("Devil Signal"), a reference to the club's nickname, the Red Devils, and the Bat-Signal from superhero Batman. The projection was visible from several parts of the city. At the Nemesio Diez Stadium, the club also sold limited-edition bracelets bearing the word Cree ("Believe"), a rallying slogan adopted by players and supporters.

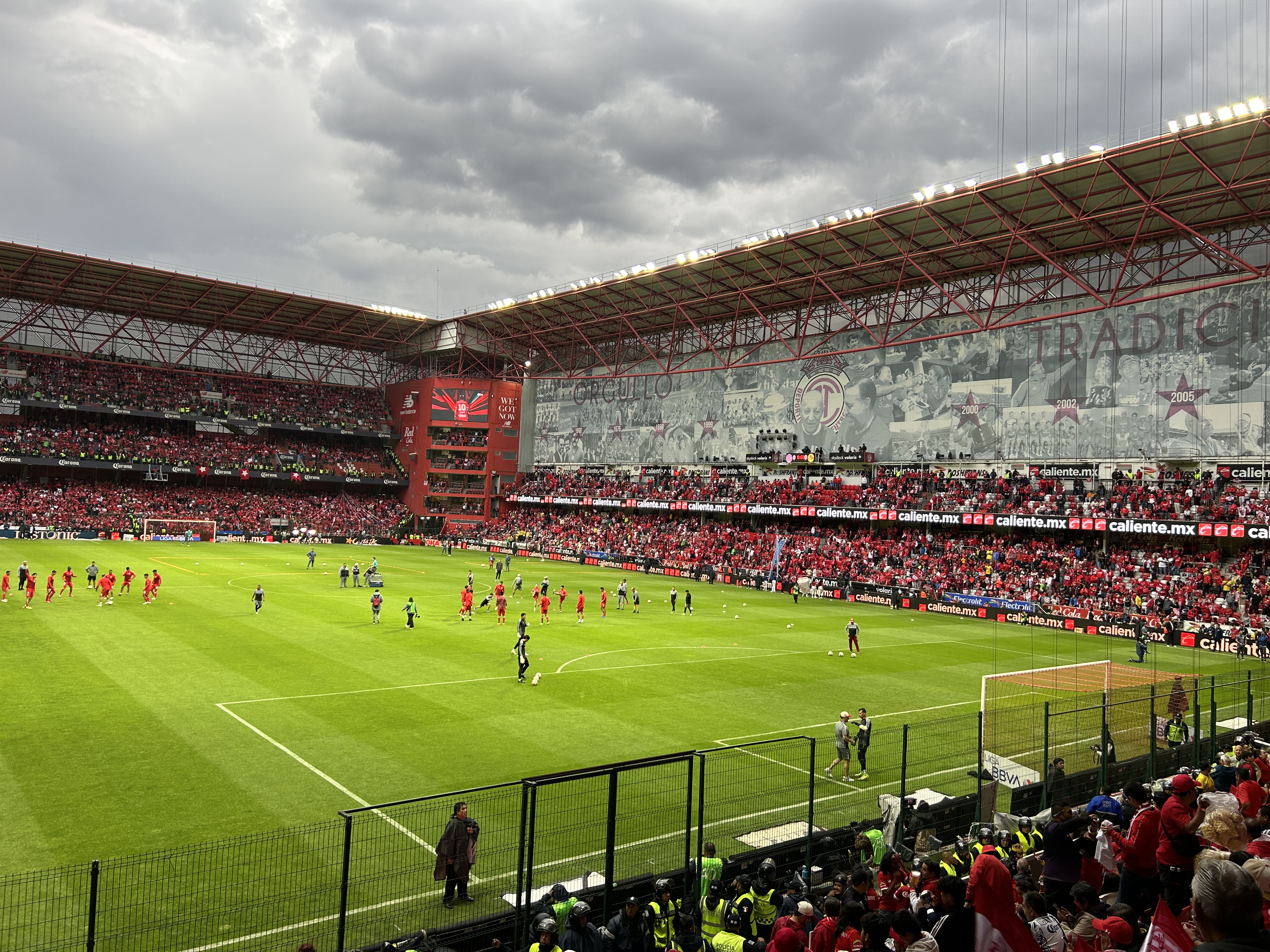
Toluca players warming up at the Nemesio Diez Stadium pitch

In the pre-match press conference the day before the match, Mohamed was joined by Marcel Ruiz, Paulinho, Federico Pereira, Jesús Ricardo Angulo, and Luis García. Mohamed stated that the squad was motivated to compete for the title at home, and Ruiz emphasized the role of the home supporters. Paulinho addressed the match's collective nature, acknowledging André-Pierre Gignac's performance in Liga MX while maintaining the focus on team performance.

Tigres head coach Guido Pizarro held a separate press conference alongside Nahuel Guzmán and Ángel Correa. Pizarro acknowledged the challenge of facing Toluca at Nemesio Diez Stadium but expressed confidence in the squad's international experience. Guzmán spoke of the team's competitive resolve, while Correa stated that Tigres intended to reverse the recent results between the two clubs.

That morning, Tigres conducted a pitch inspection, with Gignac, Correa, Juan Brunetta, Fernando Gorriarán, and Diego Lainez among the players taking part in the session. Toluca held their final training session at the stadium that evening, with Paulinho, Ruiz, Angulo, and Franco Romero present during the session.

The State of Mexico government deployed 1,952 law enforcement members for the match, supported by 204 surveillance cameras connected to the Toluca monitoring center, 96 patrol cars, 29 buses, seven motorcycles, five canine units, and ten mounted units, as well as helicopter and drone surveillance. Thirteen road closures were implemented from 14:00 on 30 May on streets surrounding the stadium. Authorities stated that the operation also served as a preliminary exercise ahead of a friendly match between Mexico and Serbia at the same venue on 4 June.

=== Day of the match ===
Ahead of the match, Toluca supporters gathered across the city, with crowds filling parts of downtown Toluca, including Cosmovitral Botanical Garden, Cuauhtémoc Park (also known as Alameda Central), Portales de Toluca, and surrounding streets. Fans made their way toward the stadium amid chants and caravans with flags from the team. In the hours before kickoff, traffic on the streets near the stadium grew congested.

Security personnel, including mounted police, officers on foot, and patrol vehicles, were deployed across the stadium's access points as supporters gathered ahead of the arrival of both squads. No major incidents were reported, though a police officer was filmed striking a Toluca supporter during the escorting of Tigres fans into the stadium, prompting Toluca mayor Ricardo Moreno Bastida to announce an investigation.

At 16:30, Toluca's squad bus arrived at the stadium and were greeted by supporters lining the route. Tigres arrived fifteen minutes later with jeers from the home crowd, although a few Tigres supporters were onsite to chant in their favor. Outside the stadium, activities including foosball, shooting practice, and other contests were available. Supporters who were unable to obtain tickets followed the match on screens set up outside the stadium.

== Match ==
=== First half ===
The first half was mostly uneventful, with few chances created by both teams. Toluca assumed early control, pressing Tigres in their own half. The opening exchanges were physical, with both sides committing frequent fouls in the midfield. In the 5th minute, Toluca midfielder Helinho attempted to catch Tigres goalkeeper Guzmán off his line with a long-range shot but was denied. In the 16th minute, Toluca midfielder Nicolás Castro met a cross with a header inside the penalty area but failed to find the target. Castro again threatened in the 21st minute with a long-range effort, but Guzmán held it comfortably. In the next minute, Toluca striker Paulinho made a shot from the penalty area but missed its target. Tigres responded in the 33rd minute when Diego Lainez struck from range, with the shot narrowly missing the post. In the 39th minute, Jesús Garza attempted a volley for Tigres but was denied by Toluca goalkeeper García.

In the 43rd minute, Garza drove a left-footed shot toward García, whose save produced a rebound that Tigres forward Correa attempted to convert with a header, but Toluca defender Romero cleared the danger. A minute later, Toluca winger Angulo won possession and broke clear of a defender one-on-one against Guzmán, but Tigres defender Joaquim Henrique intervened to prevent the shot. Toluca carried more offensive initiative throughout the first half but were unable to convert, with imprecision in the final pass frequently breaking down promising moves. Tigres remained organized in defense and looked to respond through transitions and efforts from outside the penalty area. The first half ended goalless.

=== Second half ===
Tigres were more aggressive on the offensive in the second half. Ozziel Herrera was the first to threaten on the 47th minute, shooting toward Toluca's goal, but was denied by García. Toluca responded with a substitution, replacing Toluca midfielder Ruiz, who had been struggling with an injury, with Fernando Arce. Tigres continued to press and created another opportunity in the 55th minute when Correa beat Toluca defender Everardo López and shot toward goal, only to be narrowly denied by García. In the 62nd minute, Toluca created an opportunity from the left wing when López crossed for Paulinho, whose shot cleared the crossbar. Tigres were also forced into a substitution when Herrera, having suffered an injury, was replaced by Marcelo Flores. In the 65th minute, Castro shot from outside the penalty area for Toluca, but the effort missed the target. Further substitutions followed, with Tigres introducing Brunetta and Marco Farfan and Toluca bringing in Pável Pérez.

On the 74th minute, shortly after entering the pitch, Flores suffered an injury to his right knee while competing for the ball against Santiago Simón and was replaced by Gignac. Tigres also introduced Diego Sánchez. Tigres assumed control of the match in the latter stages of the half, with goalkeeper García producing several crucial saves to keep Toluca level. In the 78th minute, Rômulo Zwarg connected with a corner kick and headed toward goal, but García denied the effort on the goal line. The rebound fell to Gignac, who shot from close range but was again denied by García, who stopped the shot with his foot. Toluca made further substitutions late in the half, introducing Diego Barbosa and Jorge Díaz Price. The half ended goalless, with the match level at 0–0 after regular time.

=== Extra time ===
Once extra time began, Toluca made further substitutions, introducing Mauricio Isaís on the left wing and Sebastián Córdova in midfield. Tigres carried their second-half momentum into extra time, while Toluca adopted a defensive shape and looked to counter-attack. In the 93rd minute, Correa received the ball inside Toluca's area and shot across goal, but was denied by García.

In the 102nd minute, Toluca's first clear opportunity of extra time materialized when Córdoba gained ground down the right wing, evading two defenders before shooting toward the Tigres goal. Guzmán got a hand to the shot but failed to hold it, with the ball rolling behind him before he recovered. In the 103rd minute, Toluca took the lead when Arce played a pass into the area for Díaz Price, who turned and finished past Guzmán to make it 1–0.

With Toluca ahead, Tigres pressed to level the match. In the 113th minute, a left-wing free kick from Brunetta was met by Joaquim with a header to equalize at 1–1. Tigres continued to threaten, and in the 117th minute Correa again shot toward goal but was denied by García. Extra time ended 1–1 and the match proceeded to a penalty shoot-out.

=== Penalty shoot-out ===
The penalty shootout was delayed as Guzmán engaged in gamesmanship to unsettle the Toluca penalty takers. The penalty shootout opened with Pérez for Toluca, whose right-footed shot beat Guzmán despite the goalkeeper diving in the correct direction. Gignac stepped up first for Tigres and shot to the left, with García diving the wrong way. Simón converted Toluca's second penalty, shooting left with enough power to beat Guzmán despite the goalkeeper getting a hand to it. Brunetta scored for Tigres, sending García the wrong way with a shot to the right. Federico Pereira scored Toluca's third, a low effort shot that Guzmán nearly stopped. Fernando Gorriarán shot to the right for Tigres but was denied by García. Romero stepped up with the opportunity to win the shootout for Toluca but saw his right-footed effort saved by Guzmán. Diego Lainez converted Tigres's fifth penalty with a left-footed shot to level the shootout and force sudden death.

Córdoba opened sudden death for Toluca with a powerful conversion. Prior to Tigres's turn, Guzmán was issued a yellow card for his theatrics. Rômulo leveled for Tigres with a left-footed shot. Arce scored for Toluca with a right-footed effort. Purata stepped up next for Tigres with a left shot but was denied by García, sealing the shootout 6–5 and the CONCACAF Champions Cup for Toluca.

== Details ==
30 May 2026
20:00 (18:00 UTC−6)

Toluca (Mexico)	1–1 (a.e.t.)	(Mexico) Tigres UANL
J. Díaz 104'		Joaquim 114'
Penalties
Pérez (penalty scored); Simón (penalty scored); Pereira (penalty scored); J. Díaz (penalty scored); Romero (penalty missed); Córdova (penalty scored); Arce (penalty scored)	6–5	(penalty scored) Gignac; (penalty scored) Brunetta; (penalty missed) Gorriarán; (penalty scored) Correa; (penalty scored) Lainez; (penalty scored) Rômulo; (penalty missed) Purata

Nemesio Diez Stadium, Toluca
Referee: Ismail Elfath (United States)

Toluca	Tigres UANL

GK	22	(Mexico) Luis García
RB	19	(Argentina) Santiago Simón
CB	4	(Uruguay) Bruno Méndez
CB	6	(Uruguay) Federico Pereira
LB	25	(Mexico) Everardo López	(yellow card) 87'	(substituted off) 91'
RM	11	(Brazil) Helinho		(substituted off) 89'
CM	5	(Argentina) Franco Romero
CM	14	(Mexico) Marcel Ruiz		(substituted off) 52'
LM	8	(Argentina) Nicolás Castro (c)		(substituted off) 89'
CF	10	(Mexico) Jesús Ricardo Angulo		(substituted off) 70'
CF	26	(Portugal) Paulinho		(substituted off) 101'
Substitutes:
GK	1	(Mexico) Hugo González
DF	2	(Mexico) Diego Barbosa		(substituted on) 89'
DF	3	(Mexico) Antonio Briseño
DF	13	(Brazil) Luan
DF	16	(Mexico) Érick Orta
DF	17	(Mexico) Mauricio Isais	(yellow card) 96'	(substituted on) 90'
DF	35	(Mexico) Alek Álvarez
MF	7	(Mexico) Sebastián Córdova		(substituted on) 101'
MF	15	(Mexico) Pável Pérez		(substituted on) 70'
MF	24	(United States) Fernando Arce Jr.		(substituted on) 52'
MF	29	(Mexico) Jorge Díaz		(substituted on) 89'
MF	33	(Mexico) Víctor Arteaga
Manager:
(Argentina) Antonio Mohamed

GK	1	(Argentina) Nahuel Guzmán	(yellow card) PSO
RB	32	(Mexico) Vladimir Loroña		(substituted off) 68'
CB	23	(Brazil) Rômulo (c)
CB	28	(Brazil) Joaquim Henrique
LB	14	(Mexico) Jesús Garza		(substituted off) 109'
CM	5	(Uruguay) César Araújo		(substituted off) 78'
CM	8	(Uruguay) Fernando Gorriarán
RW	16	(Mexico) Diego Lainez	(yellow card) 90+3'
AM	7	(Argentina) Ángel Correa
LW	77	(Mexico) Ozziel Herrera		(substituted off) 63'
CF	17	(Uruguay) Rodrigo Aguirre		(substituted off) 68'
Substitutes:
GK	13	(United States) Antonio Carrera
GK	25	(Mexico) Carlos Felipe Rodríguez
DF	2	(Mexico) Francisco Reyes
DF	3	(United States) Marco Farfan		(substituted on) 68'
DF	4	(Mexico) Juanjo Purata		(substituted on) 109'
DF	27	(Mexico) Jesús Alberto Angulo
MF	6	(Mexico) Juan Vigón
MF	11	(Argentina) Juan Brunetta		(substituted on) 68'
MF	20	(Canada) Marcelo Flores		(substituted on) 63'	(substituted off) 78'
MF	22	(Brazil) Henrique Simeone
FW	10	(France) André-Pierre Gignac		(substituted on) 78'
FW	30	(Mexico) Diego Sánchez		(substituted on) 78'
Manager:
(Argentina) Guido Pizarro

Assistant referees:
Allen Chapman (United States)
Corey Parker (United States)
Kyle Atkins (United States)
Oshane Nation (Jamaica)

Overall statistics
Statistic	Toluca	Tigres UANL
Goals scored	1	1
Total shots	13	15
Shots on target	5	8
Saves	8	4
Corner kicks	4	7
Fouls committed	24	14
Yellow cards	2	2
Red cards	0	0

== Post-match ==
The victory marked Toluca's first international title in 23 years, their last having come in 2003. The victory capped one of the most successful periods in Toluca's history, the club having won two Liga MX titles, the 2025 Campeón de Campeones, and the 2025 Campeones Cup in the preceding twelve months. The win also earned Toluca a place in the 2026 FIFA Intercontinental Cup and qualification for the 2029 FIFA Club World Cup, where they will represent CONCACAF alongside Cruz Azul, who claimed the 2025 CONCACAF Champions Cup. It will mark Toluca's first participation in both the FIFA Intercontinental Cup and the FIFA Club World Cup. (Note: Tigres had previously appeared in one FIFA Club World Cup in 2020, reaching the final before losing 1–0 to Bayern Munich.) Two further CONCACAF spots are available for the 2029 FIFA Club World Cup, to be allocated to the winners of the 2027 CONCACAF Champions Cup and the 2028 CONCACAF Champions Cup.

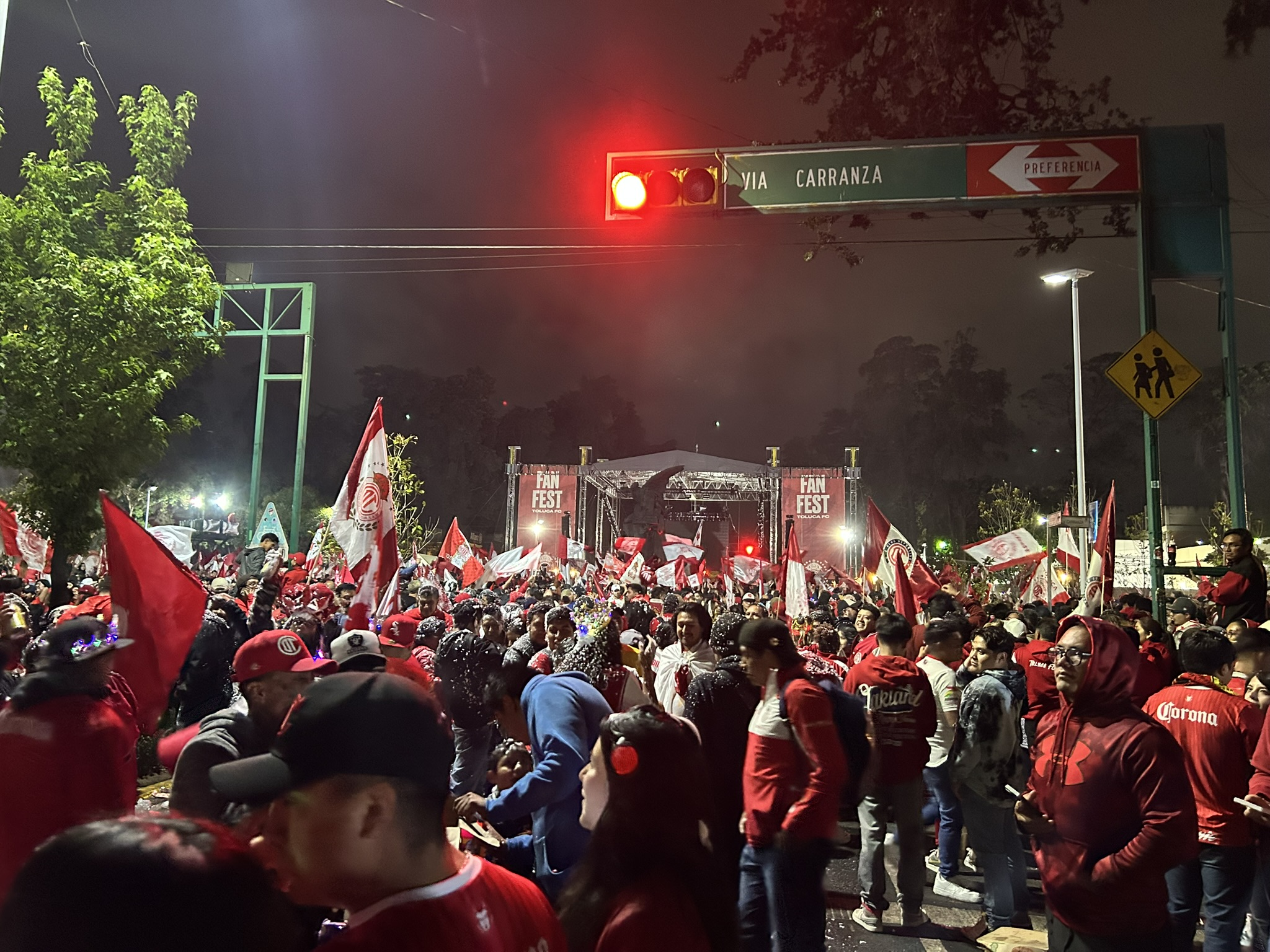
Toluca supporters gathering after winning a championship

Beyond the result, Tigres faced two additional concerns following the match. Flores, a member of the Canadian national football team squad ahead of the 2026 FIFA World Cup, was substituted during the match and was confirmed to have ruptured his ACL, ruling him out of the tournament. Gignac, meanwhile, played his final match for Tigres after more than a decade with the club, having established himself as their all-time leading scorer and contributing to multiple titles, including five Liga MX titles and the 2020 CONCACAF Champions League.

Toluca's goalkeeper García was named Player of the Match and received the tournament's Best Goalkeeper award. Following the final whistle, García expressed his desire to represent the Mexico national team at the 2026 FIFA World Cup. (Note: The following day, Mexico head coach Javier Aguirre released the definitive squad for the 2026 FIFA World Cup, with García not among the three goalkeepers selected. Aguirre opted instead for Raúl Rangel, Carlos Acevedo, and Guillermo Ochoa.) He paid tribute to the Toluca supporters for their backing throughout his decade with the club and acknowledged the collective effort behind the club's recent run of titles. Toluca striker Paulinho earned the Top Scorer and Best Player awards for the tournament, having contributed eight goals and one assist across the edition, including a hat-trick and two braces, and directly contributing to goals in five of Toluca's seven appearances.

In Toluca, celebrations broke out along Paseo Colón, centered at the Glorieta del Águila, a roundabout where Toluca supporters traditionally gather to mark significant victories. Hundreds of fans assembled with flags, food, and drinks, singing the Cumbia de los Trapos, a song by Argentine group Yerba Brava that Toluca supporters have adopted as an unofficial anthem. Celebrations extended until the following day, where the Toluca team did a tour across the city with the trophy. According to Toluca municipal authorities, more than 8,000 people attended the celebrations across various points along the route. Security personnel and emergency services were deployed to coordinate traffic and ensure public safety.

== Broadcast and viewership ==
The final was broadcast across North America through several regional providers: FOX Sports and TelevisaUnivision in the United States, Fox in Mexico, OneSoccer in Canada, and ESPN in Central America and the Caribbean. The final drew a total audience of 1,915,000 viewers across paid television channels. By comparison, the UEFA Champions League final, held the same day between Paris Saint-Germain and Arsenal, attracted approximately 5 million views in the United Kingdom alone, though the CONCACAF Champions Cup final outperformed it in North American viewership, where the Champions League final drew approximately 360,000 viewers.
