= Mauricio Isais =

Mexican-American footballer (born 2001)

Mauricio Isaís
Personal information
- Full name: Mauricio André Isaís
- Date of birth: 9 April 2001 (age 25)
- Place of birth: Brownwood, Texas, United States
- Height: 1.85 m (6 ft 1 in)
- Position: Left-back

Team information
- Current team: Pachuca
- Number: 6

Youth career
- 2014: Morelia
- 2015–2018: North Carolina Fusion
- 2018–2022: Pachuca
- 2019–2020: → León (loan)

Senior career*
| Years | Team | Apps | (Gls) |
| 2018–2023 | Pachuca | 39 | (3) |
| 2019–2021 | → León (loan) | 2 | (0) |
| 2023–2026 | Toluca | 28 | (0) |
| 2024–2025 | → León (loan) | 7 | (1) |
| 2026– | Pachuca | 15 | (0) |

International career^{‡}
| 2023 | Mexico U23 | 8 | (0) |
Medal record
Men's football
Representing Mexico
Pan American Games
| Bronze medal – third place | 2023 Santiago | Team |
- * Club domestic league appearances and goals as of 21 November 2026 ‡ National team caps and goals as of 4 November 2023

Mauricio André Isais (born 9 April 2001) is an American-born Mexican professional footballer who plays as a left-back for Liga MX club Pachuca.

== Early life ==
Born in Brownwood, Texas to Mexican parents, in 2001, Isais' family relocated to the Mexican town of San Francisco del Rincón in the state of Guanajuato, near the city of León. It was there that he began to develop a love for the sport. Eventually earning a spot with Morelia's academy, he became a starter for their under-13 squad in 2014, but then he moved to the U.S. that same year. With relatives nearby and with better job prospects, his parents decided on North Carolina. Isais attended East Forsyth High School in Kernersville, North Carolina.

== Club career ==
=== Pachuca ===
In 2018, Isais joined the Pachuca youth system. He made his professional debut for Pachuca on 16 April 2022, against Juárez.

==== León (loan) ====
In 2019, Isais signed for Liga MX club León. He made his professional against his parent club Pachuca on 26 January 2020.

=== Toluca ===
On 30 May 2023, Isais signed with Toluca.

=== Return to Pachuca ===
On 25 June 2026, Isais returned to Pachuca.

== International career ==
Born in the United States, Isais is eligible to represent the United States and Mexico at international level.

=== Mexico ===
In November 2022, Isais was called up by Mexico manager Gerardo Martino for Mexico's World Cup preparation friendlies against Iraq and Sweden in Girona, Spain. He featured on the bench in Mexico's 4–0 against Iraq but did not make an appearance with the national team.

== Career statistics ==
=== Club ===
As of match played on 21 November 2026

| Club | Season | League | | | Cup | | Continental | | Other | | Total | |
| Club | Season | Division | Apps | Goals | Apps | Goals | Apps | Goals | Apps | Goals | Apps | Goals |
|---|---|---|---|---|---|---|---|---|---|---|---|---|
| Pachuca | 2021–22 | Liga MX | 1 | 0 | — | | — | | — | | 1 | 0 |
| Pachuca | 2022–23 | Liga MX | 38 | 3 | — | | 2 (Note: Appearances in CONCACAF Champions Cup) | 0 | — | | 40 | 3 |
| Pachuca | Total | | 39 | 3 | — | | 2 | 0 | — | | 41 | 3 |
| León (loan) | 2019–20 | Liga MX | 2 | 0 | — | | — | | — | | 2 | 0 |
| Toluca | 2023–24 | Liga MX | 15 | 0 | — | | 2 | 1 | 4 (Note: Appearances in Leagues Cup) | 0 | 21 | 1 |
| Toluca | 2025–26 | Liga MX | 13 | 0 | — | | 3 | 0 | — | | 16 | 0 |
| Toluca | Total | | 28 | 0 | — | | 5 | 1 | 4 | 0 | 37 | 1 |
| León (loan) | 2024–25 | Liga MX | 7 | 1 | — | | — | | — | | 7 | 1 |
| Pachuca | 2026–27 | Liga MX | 15 | 0 | — | | — | | 3 | 0 | 18 | 0 |
| Career total | | | 91 | 4 | 0 | 0 | 7 | 1 | 7 | 0 | 105 | 5 |

== Honours ==
Pachuca

- Liga MX: Apertura 2022
- Campeón de Campeones: 2025

Toluca

- Liga MX: Apertura 2025
- Campeones Cup: 2025
- CONCACAF Champions Cup: 2026

Mexico U23

- Pan American Bronze Medal: 2023
