= Everardo López =

Mexican footballer (born 2005)

Personal information
- Full name: Everardo López del Villar
- Date of birth: 23 March 2005 (age 21)
- Place of birth: Metepec, State of Mexico, Mexico
- Height: 1.80 m (5 ft 11 in)
- Position: Defender

Team information
- Current team: Toluca
- Number: 25

Youth career
- 2018–2025: Toluca

Senior career*
Years	Team	Apps	(Gls)
2022–	Toluca	61	(2)

International career^{‡}
2021	Mexico U17	1	(0)
2022	Mexico U18	2	(0)
2023	Mexico U19	3	(1)
2022–2025	Mexico U20	10	(0)
2023–	Mexico U23	3	(0)
2026–	Mexico	6	(0)
Medal record
Men's football
Representing Mexico
Toulon Tournament
Second place	2023 France	Team
- * Club domestic league appearances and goals as of 21 November 2026 ‡ National team caps and goals as of 6 October 2026

Everardo López del Villar (born 23 March 2005) is a Mexican professional footballer who plays as a defender for Liga MX club Toluca and the Mexico national team.

== Club career ==
=== Toluca ===
López began his career at the academy of Toluca, progressing through all categories, until making his professional debut on 17 April 2022, being subbed in at the 37th minute of a 0–3 loss to UANL.

== International career ==
In 2025, López was called up by coach Eduardo Arce to represent Mexico at the FIFA U-20 World Cup held in Chile. On 25 January 2026, López made his senior debut for Mexico against Bolivia in a friendly, recording an assist.

== Career statistics ==
=== Club ===
As of match played on 21 November 2026

Appearances and goals by club, season and competition
Club	Season	League			Cup		Continental		Other		Total	
Club	Season	Division	Apps	Goals	Apps	Goals	Apps	Goals	Apps	Goals	Apps	Goals
Toluca	2021–22	Liga MX	1	0	—		—		—		1	0
Toluca	2022–23	Liga MX	2	0	3 (Note: Appearances in Copa Sky por México)	0	—		—		5	0
Toluca	2023–24	Liga MX	2	0	—		—		—		2	0
Toluca	2024–25	Liga MX	12	0	—		—		—		12	0
Toluca	2025–26	Liga MX	31	1	—		6 (Note: Appearances in CONCACAF Champions Cup)	1	1 (Note: Appearances in Leagues Cup)	0	38	2
Toluca	2026–27	Liga MX	13	1	1 (Note: Appearance in Campeón de Campeones)	0	—		6	0	20	1
Career total			61	2	4	0	6	1	7	0	78	3

=== International ===
As of match played on 6 October 2026

Appearances and goals by national team and year
National team	Year	Apps	Goals
Mexico	2026	6	0
Total		6	0

== Honours ==
Toluca

- Liga MX: Clausura 2025, Apertura 2025
- Campeon de Campeones: 2025
- Campeones Cup: 2025
- CONCACAF Champions Cup: 2026
- Leagues Cup: 2026
