= Jesús Ricardo Angulo =

Mexican footballer (born 1997)

Jesús Angulo
Personal information
- Full name: Jesús Ricardo Angulo Uriarte
- Date of birth: 20 February 1997 (age 29)
- Place of birth: Culiacán, Sinaloa, Mexico
- Height: 1.72 m (5 ft 7 1/2 in)
- Positions: Winger; midfielder

Team information
- Current team: Toluca
- Number: 10

Youth career
- 2013: Águilas UAS
- 2014–2015: Tijuana
- 2015–2016: Sinaloa

Senior career*
Years	Team	Apps	(Gls)
2016–2018	Sinaloa	65	(13)
2018–2019	Tijuana	27	(1)
2019	Necaxa	21	(4)
2020–2022	Guadalajara	83	(12)
2023	León	10	(1)
2023–	Toluca	116	(21)

International career^{‡}
2021	Mexico U23	11	(2)
2019–2021	Mexico	3	(1)
Medal record
Olympic Games
Bronze medal – third place	2020 Tokyo	Team
Olympic Qualifying Championship
Winner	2020 Mexico
- * Club domestic league appearances and goals as of 12 September 2026 ‡ National team caps and goals as of 28 October 2021

Jesús Ricardo Angulo Uriarte (born 20 February 1997), also known as Canelo, is a Mexican professional footballer who plays as a winger and midfielder for Liga MX club Toluca.

Despite sharing the same first name, both paternal and maternal surnames, and hometown, he is not related to Jesús Alberto Angulo.

== Club career ==
Angulo made his Liga MX debut with Sinaloa on 13 March 2016 against Toluca in a 3–0 loss.

With Sinaloa descending to Ascenso MX the following season, he started playing in the starting eleven and won the Apertura tournament. On 21 January 2017, he scored his first goal with them in a 4–2 loss against Atlante. On 3 March 2017, he scored his first brace against Cimarrones de Sonora in 5–1 victory.

Signed by Tijuana, he made his debut for the team on 21 July 2018 against Guadalajara, winning 2–1.

In June 2019, he was signed by Necaxa for the 2019 Apertura. On 28 July, he debuted with Necaxa in a 2–0 loss against UNAM. On 14 September, he scored his first goal and brace with the team in a 2–0 victory over Monterrey.

On 17 December 2019, it was officially announced that Angulo was signed by Guadalajara for the 2020 Clausura. On 11 January 2020 he made his official debut for the team, coming on as a substitute at the 70th minute in a 2–0 victory over Juárez. On 12 August, he would score his first goal with Chivas in a 2–0 victory over Juárez.

On 21 November 2020, he scored Guadalajara's only goal during the reclassification phase of the Guardianes championship against Necaxa, qualifying them to the quarter-finals.

On 27 October 2024, Angulo scored a hat-trick against Necaxa in a 3–1 away victory.

== International career ==
=== Youth ===
Angulo was called up by Jaime Lozano to be in the preliminary roster for the 2019 Toulon Tournament but did not make the final list.

In January 2020, Angulo was called up again by Lozano to participate in a mini-camp to prepare for the 2020 CONCACAF Men's Olympic Qualifying Championship.

Angulo participated at the 2020 CONCACAF Olympic Qualifying Championship, appearing in five matches, where Mexico won the competition. He was subsequently called up to participate in the 2020 Summer Olympics. Angulo won the bronze medal with the Olympic team.

=== Senior ===
On 2 October 2019, Angulo made his senior national team debut scoring in a 2–0 victory over Trinidad and Tobago.

== Career statistics ==
=== International ===
Mexico
Year	Apps	Goals
2019	1	1
2020	0	0
2021	2	0
Total	3	1

==== International goals ====
Scores and results list Mexico's goal tally first.

No.	Date	Venue	Opponent	Score	Result	Competition
1.	2 October 2019	Estadio Nemesio Díez, Toluca, Mexico	Trinidad and Tobago	2–0	2–0	Friendly

== Honours ==
Dorados

- Ascenso MX: Apertura 2016

León

- CONCACAF Champions League: 2023

Toluca

- Liga MX: Clausura 2025, Apertura 2025
- Campeón de Campeones: 2025
- Campeones Cup: 2025
- CONCACAF Champions Cup: 2026
- Leagues Cup: 2026

Mexico U23

- CONCACAF Olympic Qualifying Championship: 2020
- Olympic Bronze Medal: 2020
