= Luis García (footballer, born 1992) =

Mexican footballer

Personal information
- Full name: Luis Manuel García Palomera
- Date of birth: 31 December 1992 (age 33)
- Place of birth: Talpa de Allende, Jalisco, Mexico
- Height: 1.83 m (6 ft 0 in)
- Position: Goalkeeper

Team information
- Current team: Toluca
- Number: 22

Senior career*
Years	Team	Apps	(Gls)
2011–2013	Chiapas	0	(0)
2013–2015	Querétaro	1	(0)
2015–2016	→ Coras (loan)	16	(0)
2016–	Toluca	129	(0)
- * Club domestic league appearances and goals as of 31 October 2026

Luis Manuel García Palomera (born 31 December 1992) is a Mexican professional footballer who plays as a goalkeeper for Liga MX club Toluca.

He has won multiple titles with the club, including two consecutive Liga MX championships and the 2026 CONCACAF Champions Cup, in which he was named best goalkeeper of the tournament and player of the match in the final.

== Early life and career ==
Luis Manuel García Palomera was born on 31 December 1992 in Talpa de Allende, Jalisco, Mexico. He began his career with Leones Negros in his hometown. In 2011, he debuted for the U-20 team of Jaguares de Chiapas. On 23 December 2013, he made his debut in the Copa MX with the first team in a game against Cruz Azul. The franchise was moved to Querétaro FC, and García stayed with the team. While in Querétaro, he was coached by Ignacio "Nacho" Ambriz and shared a locker room with Sinha, former key player of Toluca FC. García debuted with Quéretaro in the Liga MX, Mexico's top football division, on 9 March 2014 in a game against Atlante FC.

After a lackluster stint in Querétaro, he was relegated to the Ascenso MX with Coras. It was there that he met Hernán Cristante, former goalkeeper of Toluca FC who was just starting out as a coach. In Apertura 2016, when Cristante took over at Toluca FC as head coach, he requested signing García. However, the starting goalkeeper for the team was Alfredo Talavera, and García spent most decade-long career in Toluca as a substitute goalkeeper and never played for a full season. He debuted for Toluca on 16 September 2016.

In the 2017 Apertura tournament, Talavera was injured in the first match of the season, which opened an opportunity for García to play as the starting goalkeeper. In that season and in Guard1anes 2020, he played 16 matches as the starting goalkeeper, one game shy of a full season. In the latter season, goalkeeper Alfredo Saldívar replaced him in one match. Talavera left Toluca in 2020, and García became a regular starting player.

When Antonio Mohamed became the head coach of Toluca, with Spanish goalkeeper Pau López served as the first-choice option during the Clausura 2025 tournament. However, López suffered a fractured hand at the start of the playoffs, allowing García to claim the starting position again. García was consistent during the playoffs, starting every match through to the final, where Toluca were crowned Clausura 2025 champions against Club América. On 20 July 2025, Toluca faced Club América again in the 2025 Campeón de Campeones, with García starting in goal as Toluca defeated América 3–1.

By this time, rumors had begun to circulate that goalkeeper Hugo González would be joining Toluca. González had previously played under Mohamed at CF Monterrey, and upon his arrival, Mohamed stated that both goalkeepers would compete for the starting position. González went on to start half of the season and delivered a strong campaign, most notably saving a penalty from Sergio Ramos in a match against Monterrey. Despite González holding the starting position, Mohamed selected García to start in the 2025 Campeones Cup on 1 October 2025, a decision that drew attention given that González had appeared in previous matches. Toluca won the cup 2–3 against LA Galaxy. During the Apertura 2025, González served as the starting goalkeeper for the final against Tigres UANL. However, following an error in the first leg, Mohamed turned to García for the second leg. The tie was decided by a penalty shootout, in which García missed his own attempt but saved several penalties, proving decisive in Toluca's championship victory.

Internationally, García competed in the 2026 CONCACAF Champions Cup, where Toluca defeated Tigres UANL in the final, drawing 1–1 after extra time before winning 6–5 on penalties. García was named Player of the Match, having made several crucial saves throughout regular time to keep the scores level, and stopped two penalties in the shootout, including the decisive save. He was also named the tournament's best goalkeeper and included in its best XI.

== Career statistics ==
=== Club ===
As of match played 1 May 2022

Appearances and goals by club, season and competition
Club	Season	League			Cup		Continental		Other		Total	
Club	Season	Division	Apps	Goals	Apps	Goals	Apps	Goals	Apps	Goals	Apps	Goals
Chiapas	2012–13	Liga MX	0	0	3	0	—		—		3	0
Querétaro	2013–14	Liga MX	1	0	4	0	—		—		5	0
Querétaro	2014–15	Liga MX	0	0	1	0	—		—		1	0
Querétaro	Total		1	0	5	0	—		—		6	0
Coras (loan)	2014–15	Ascenso MX	4	0	6	0	—		—		10	0
Coras (loan)	2015–16	Ascenso MX	12	0	0	0	—		—		12	0
Coras (loan)	Total		16	0	6	0	—		—		22	0
Toluca	2016–17	Liga MX	2	0	5	0	—		—		7	0
Toluca	2017–18	Liga MX	25	0	8	0	—		—		33	0
Toluca	2018–19	Liga MX	7	0	3	0	0	0	—		10	0
Toluca	2019–20	Liga MX	0	0	7	0	—		—		7	0
Toluca	2020–21	Liga MX	33	0	—		—		—		33	0
Toluca	2021–22	Liga MX	24	0	—		—		—		24	0
Toluca	2022–23	Liga MX	0	0	—		—		—		0	0
Toluca	2023–24	Liga MX	0	0	—		0	0	0	0	0	0
Toluca	2024–25	Liga MX	0	0	—		0	0	0	0	0	0
Toluca	Total		91	0	23	0	0	0	0	0	114	0
Career total			108	0	37	0	0	0	0	0	145	0

== Honours ==
Toluca

- Liga MX: Clausura 2025, Apertura 2025
- Campeón de Campeones: 2025
- Campeones Cup: 2025
- CONCACAF Champions Cup: 2026
- Leagues Cup: 2026

Individual

- Liga MX Save of the Month: May 2025
- CONCACAF Champions Cup Best Goalkeeper: 2026
- CONCACAF Champions Cup Best XI: 2026
