= Fernando Arce Jr. =

American soccer player (born 1996)

Personal information
- Full name: Fernando David Arce Juárez
- Date of birth: November 27, 1996 (age 29)
- Place of birth: Chula Vista, California, United States
- Height: 5 ft 9 in (1.75 m)
- Position: Midfielder

Team information
- Current team: Toluca (on loan from Puebla)
- Number: 24

Youth career
- 2004−2007: Morelia
- 2008−2011: Santos Laguna
- 2012−2014: Tijuana

Senior career*
Years	Team	Apps	(Gls)
2014–2019	Tijuana	7	(0)
2016–2019	→ Dorados (loan)	79	(6)
2020–2024	Necaxa	75	(5)
2022	→ Juárez (loan)	26	(4)
2023	→ Puebla (loan)	7	(0)
2025–	Puebla	6	(0)
2025–	→ Toluca (loan)	17	(1)

International career^{‡}
2014–2015	United States U20	6	(0)
- * Club domestic league appearances and goals as of March 15, 2025 ‡ National team caps and goals as of October 21, 2015

Fernando David Arce Juárez (born November 27, 1996) is an American professional soccer player of Mexican origin who plays as a midfielder for Liga MX club Toluca, on loan from Puebla.

== Club career ==
Arce is the son of Mexican international footballer Fernando Arce who also played for Tijuana. Arce came up through the youth systems of Santos Laguna, Monarcas Morelia, and Tijuana. He made his first team debut for Tijuana as a substitute on March 16, 2014, in a Liga MX game against Cruz Azul.

== International career ==
Because he was born in Chula Vista, California, Arce is eligible for both the USA and Mexico. On July 14, 2014, Arce made his debut for the United States national under-20 team in a 2–1 victory over Chile.

== Honors ==
Toluca

- Liga MX: Apertura 2025
- Campeones Cup: 2025
- CONCACAF Champions Cup: 2026
- Leagues Cup: 2026
