= Federico Pereira =

Uruguayan footballer (born 2000)

Personal information
- Full name: Andrés Federico Pereira Castelnoble
- Date of birth: 24 February 2000 (age 26)
- Place of birth: Montevideo, Uruguay
- Height: 1.87 m (6 ft 2 in)
- Positions: Right-back; centre-back

Team information
- Current team: Toluca
- Number: 6

Youth career
- Liverpool Montevideo

Senior career*
Years	Team	Apps	(Gls)
2019–2023	Liverpool Montevideo	94	(10)
2024–	Toluca	91	(7)
2025	→ Pachuca (loan)	0	(0)
- * Club domestic league appearances and goals as of 12 September 2026

Andrés Federico Pereira Castelnoble (born 24 February 2000) is a Uruguayan professional footballer who plays as a right-back or centre-back for Liga MX club Toluca.

== Club career ==
A youth academy graduate of Liverpool Montevideo, Pereira made his professional debut on 4 May 2019 in a 4–0 league win against Boston River. He scored his first goal on 26 February 2020 in a 5–0 Copa Sudamericana win against Venezuelan club Llaneros.

On 30 December 2023, Mexican club Toluca announced the signing of Pereira. On 4 June 2025, he joined fellow Mexican club Pachuca on loan for the 2025 FIFA Club World Cup. He returned to Toluca during the same month as Pachuca were eliminated in the group stage of the tournament.

== International career ==
On 5 March 2021, Pereira was named in Uruguay senior team's 35-man preliminary squad for 2022 FIFA World Cup qualifying matches against Argentina and Bolivia. However, CONMEBOL suspended those matches next day amid concern over the COVID-19 pandemic. On 21 October 2022, he was named in Uruguay's 55-man preliminary squad for the 2022 FIFA World Cup. However, he was not included in the final squad, which was announced three weeks later.

== Personal life ==
Pereira is the elder brother of fellow professional footballer Agustín Pereira.

== Career statistics ==
As of 16 December 2023

Appearances and goals by club, season and competition
Club	Season	League			Cup		Continental		Other		Total	
Club	Season	Division	Apps	Goals	Apps	Goals	Apps	Goals	Apps	Goals	Apps	Goals
Liverpool Montevideo	2019	Uruguayan Primera División	4	0	—		0	0	0	0	4	0
Liverpool Montevideo	2020	Uruguayan Primera División	35	3	—		4 (Note: Appearances in Copa Sudamericana.)	1	2 (Note: One appearance each in Supercopa Uruguaya and Primera División championship playoff.)	0	41	4
Liverpool Montevideo	2021	Uruguayan Primera División	2	0	—		2 (Note: Appearances in Copa Libertadores.)	0	—		4	0
Liverpool Montevideo	2022	Uruguayan Primera División	28	4	0	0	2	0	2 (Note: One appearance each in Torneo Intermedio final and championship playoff.)	0	32	4
Liverpool Montevideo	2023	Uruguayan Primera División	25	3	0	0	4	0	4 (Note: Three appearances in championship playoffs and one appearance in Torneo Intermedio final.)	0	33	3
Career total			94	10	0	0	12	1	8	0	114	11

== Honours ==
Liverpool Montevideo

- Uruguayan Primera División: 2023
- Supercopa Uruguaya: 2020

Toluca

- Liga MX: Clausura 2025, Apertura 2025
- Campeón de Campeones: 2025
- Campeones Cup: 2025
- CONCACAF Champions Cup: 2026
- Leagues Cup: 2026

Individual

- Uruguayan Primera División Team of the Year: 2020, 2022, 2023
- Uruguayan Primera División Player of the Year: 2023
- Liga MX All-Star: 2026
