= Helinho (footballer, born 2000) =

Brazilian footballer

Personal information
- Full name: Hélio Júnior Nunes de Castro
- Date of birth: 25 April 2000 (age 26)
- Place of birth: Sertãozinho, Brazil
- Height: 1.75 m (5 ft 9 in)
- Positions: Attacking midfielder; forward

Team information
- Current team: Toluca
- Number: 11

Youth career
- 2012–2018: São Paulo

Senior career*
| Years | Team | Apps | (Gls) |
| 2018–2021 | São Paulo | 31 | (2) |
| 2020–2021 | → Red Bull Bragantino (loan) | 50 | (10) |
| 2022–2024 | Red Bull Bragantino | 65 | (13) |
| 2024– | Toluca | 59 | (16) |

International career
| 2017 | Brazil U17 | 3 | (0) |
- * Club domestic league appearances and goals as of 03:45, 21 October 2026 (UTC)

Hélio Júnio Nunes de Castro (born 25 April 2000), simply known as Helinho, is a Brazilian professional footballer who plays for Liga MX club Toluca. Mainly an attacking midfielder, he can also play as a forward.

== Club career ==
Born in Sertãozinho, Helinho entered São Paulo FC's youth ranks in 2012. On 3 May 2018, his contract was extended until April 2023. In April, he was called to the senior team for a league match against Paraná Clube.

On 4 November 2018, Helinho made his first team debut, coming on as a 46th-minute substitute for Anderson Martins and scoring a goal five minutes later in a 2–2 draw against Flamengo.

On September 15, 2024, Helinho Joined Toluca FC for €13.50m after his time with Red Bull Bragantino

== International career ==
On 6 October 2017, Helinho was called to the Brazil under-17 squad for the Under-17 World Cup as a replacement for the injured Vinícius Júnior. On 23 April 2018, he was called up to the Brazil under-20 team.

== Career statistics ==
As of 8 December 2021

Appearances and goals by club, season and competition
| Club | Season | League | | | State League | | National Cup | | Continental | | Other | | Total | |
| Club | Season | Division | Apps | Goals | Apps | Goals | Apps | Goals | Apps | Goals | Apps | Goals | Apps | Goals |
|---|---|---|---|---|---|---|---|---|---|---|---|---|---|---|
| São Paulo | 2018 | Série A | 5 | 1 | — | | 0 | 0 | — | | — | | 5 | 1 |
| São Paulo | 2019 | Série A | 8 | 0 | 10 | 0 | 1 | 0 | 1 (Note: Appearances in Copa Libertadores) | 0 | — | | 20 | 0 |
| São Paulo | 2020 | Série A | 3 | 0 | 5 | 1 | 0 | 0 | 2 | 0 | — | | 10 | 1 |
| São Paulo | Total | | 16 | 1 | 15 | 1 | 1 | 0 | 3 | 0 | — | | 35 | 2 |
| Red Bull Brasil (loan) | 2020 | Série A | 10 | 3 | — | | — | | — | | — | | 10 | 3 |
| Red Bull Brasil (loan) | 2021 | Série A | 32 | 5 | 8 | 2 | 4 | 0 | 10 (Note: Appearances in Copa Sudamericana) | 1 | — | | 54 | 8 |
| Red Bull Brasil (loan) | Total | | 42 | 8 | 8 | 2 | 4 | 0 | 10 | 1 | — | | 64 | 11 |
| Career total | | | 58 | 9 | 23 | 3 | 5 | 0 | 13 | 1 | 0 | 0 | 99 | 13 |

== Honours ==
Toluca

- Liga MX: Clausura 2025, Apertura 2025
- Campeón de Campeones: 2025
- Campeones Cup: 2025
- CONCACAF Champions Cup: 2026
- Leagues Cup: 2026

Individual

- CONCACAF Champions Cup Best XI: 2026
