= Nicolás Castro (footballer, born 2000) =

Argentine footballer

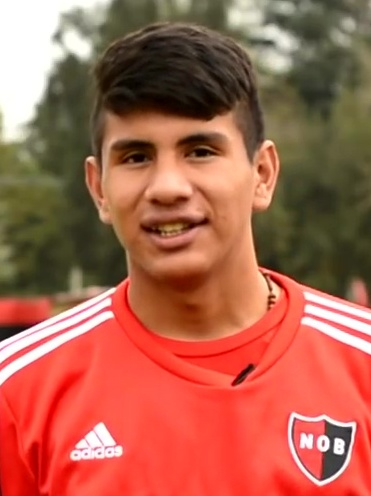

Personal information
- Full name: Nicolás Federico Castro
- Date of birth: 1 November 2000 (age 26)
- Place of birth: Rafaela, Argentina
- Height: 1.77 m (5 ft 10 in)
- Position: Midfielder

Team information
- Current team: Toluca
- Number: 8

Youth career
- 2006–2016: 9 de Julio
- 2016–2019: Newell's Old Boys

Senior career*
Years	Team	Apps	(Gls)
2019–2022	Newell's Old Boys	43	(8)
2022–2024	Genk	23	(0)
2023–2024	→ Elche (loan)	38	(5)
2024–2025	Elche	34	(4)
2025–	Toluca	0	(0)

International career
2017	Argentina U17	2	(0)
- * Club domestic league appearances and goals as of 19 June 2025

Nicolás Federico Castro (born 1 November 2000) is an Argentine professional footballer who plays as a midfielder for Liga MX club Toluca.

== Professional career ==
A youth product of 9 de Julio, Castro joined the academy of Newell's Old Boys in 2016. On 3 January 2019, Castro signed his first professional contract with Newell's Old Boys. Castro made his professional debut with Newell's Old Boys in a 1-0 Argentine Primera División loss to Argentinos Juniors on 25 November 2019.

On 18 July 2022, Castro signed a five-year contract with Genk. On 7 August 2023, he was loaned to Spanish Segunda División side Elche on a season-long deal.

== Career statistics ==
As of match played 30 October 2024

Appearances and goals by club, season and competition
Club	Season	League			National cup (Note: Includes Copa Argentina, Belgian Cup, Copa del Rey)		Continental		Other		Total	
Club	Season	Division	Apps	Goals	Apps	Goals	Apps	Goals	Goals	Apps	Goals	Apps
Newell's Old Boys	2019-20	Argentine Primera División	3	0	0	0	—		0	0	3	0
Newell's Old Boys	2020-21	Argentine Primera División	4	0	0	0	—		0	0	4	0
Newell's Old Boys	2021	Argentine Primera División	24	5	0	0	3 (Note: Appearance(s) in Copa Sudamericana)	1	0	0	27	6
Newell's Old Boys	2022	Argentine Primera División	16	3	1	0	—		0	0	17	3
Newell's Old Boys	Total		47	8	1	0	3	1	0	0	51	9
Genk	2022-23	Belgian Pro League	23	0	3	0	—		—		26	0
Genk	2023-24	Belgian Pro League	0	0	0	0	0	0	—		0	0
Genk	Total		23	0	3	0	0	0	—		26	0
Jong Genk	2022-23	Challenger Pro League	4	0	—		—		—		4	0
Elche (loan)	2023-24	Segunda División	38	5	3	0	—		—		41	5
Elche (loan)	2024-25	Segunda División	8	1	0	0	—		—		8	1
Elche (loan)	Total		46	6	3	0	—		—		49	6
Career total			120	14	7	0	3	1	0	0	130	15

== Honours ==
Toluca

- Liga MX: Apertura 2025
- Campeón de Campeones: 2025
- Campeones Cup: 2025
- CONCACAF Champions Cup: 2026
- Leagues Cup: 2026

Individual

- CONCACAF Champions Cup Best XI: 2026
- Liga MX All-Star: 2026
- Liga MX Best Offensive Midfielder: 2025–26
