= Tigres UANL in international football =

- Club: Tigres UANL
- Most appearances: Nahuel Guzmán (64)
- Top scorer: André-Pierre Gignac (26)
- First entry: 1979 CONCACAF Champions' Cup
- Latest entry: 2025 Leagues Cup

Titles
- Champions League: 1: 2020

Tigres de la Universidad Autónoma de Nuevo León (or simply Tigres UANL) is a Mexican professional football club based in San Nicolás, Nuevo León. The club has participated in a total of 20 international tournaments across CONCACAF, CONMEBOL, and FIFA.

The club's first appearance in an international tournament was in the 1979 CONCACAF Champions' Cup, from which it qualified as league champion. In the tournament, it defeated Soccer Universidad AC of the United States in the first round of the North American Zone, but fell in the semifinals to C.D. FAS of El Salvador. After two appearances in 1981 and 1983, Tigres would be absent from the tournament for almost 30 years, until its return in the 2012-13 edition; in total, it has participated in the competition twelve times.

At the international level, Tigres has won the CONCACAF Champions Cup/League once, in the 2020 edition; in previous years, the team had lost three finals. Outside of CONCACAF, they were the third club from Mexico to appear in a Copa Libertadores final (2015), following Cruz Azul in 2001 and Guadalajara in 2010.

Tigres' best result in an international competition was a runner-up finish at the 2020 FIFA Club World Cup, when they lost the final to Bayern Munich. To date, it is the greatest soccer achievement achieved by a Mexican and North American club.

== Overall record ==
Competition	Played	Won	Draw	Loss	GF	GA	GD	Win%
CONCACAF Champions Cup/League	74	37	22	15	120	61	+59	50.00
Copa Libertadores	34	15	12	7	57	41	+16	44.12
FIFA Club World Cup	3	2	0	1	3	2	+1	66.67
Leagues Cup	8	5	1	2	10	7	+3	62.50
Total	119	59	35	25	190	111	+79	49.58

== Head-to-head record ==
The following table shows Tigres UANL all-time North American and international record.

Positive record Neutral record Negative record

Country	Club	Pld	W	D	L	W %
(Argentina)	Club Atlético Banfield	2	1	1	0	50.00
(Argentina)	Club Atlético River Plate	4	0	3	1	0.00
(Bolivia)	Club San José	2	2	0	0	100.00
(Bolivia)	Universitario de Sucre	2	1	1	0	50.00
(Brazil)	SC Corinthians Paulista	2	1	0	1	50.00
(Brazil)	SC Internacional	2	1	0	1	50.00
(Brazil)	SE Palmeiras	1	1	0	0	100.00
(Brazil)	São Paulo FC	2	1	0	1	50.00
(Canada)	Toronto FC	2	1	0	1	50.00
(Canada)	Vancouver Whitecaps FC	5	3	2	0	60.00
(Chile)	Unión Española	2	0	1	1	0.00
(Chile)	Club Deportivo Universidad Católica	2	1	0	1	50.00
(Colombia)	Deportivo Cali	2	1	1	0	50.00
(Colombia)	Once Caldas	2	1	1	0	50.00
(Costa Rica)	Liga Deportiva Alajuelense	2	1	1	0	50.00
(Costa Rica)	C.S. Herediano	6	3	3	0	50.00
(Costa Rica)	Deportivo Saprissa	2	1	0	1	50.00
(Ecuador)	C.S. Emelec	2	1	0	1	50.00
(El Salvador)	Alianza F.C.	2	1	0	1	50.00
(El Salvador)	C.D. Atlético Marte	2	0	1	1	0.00
(El Salvador)	C.D. FAS	2	0	1	1	0.00
(El Salvador)	A.D. Isidro Metapán	2	2	0	0	100.00
(Guatemala)	C.S.D. Suchitepéquez	2	0	1	1	0.00
(Guatemala)	C.S.D. Xelajú MC	2	1	1	0	50.00
(Germany)	FC Bayern Munich	1	0	0	1	0.00
(Honduras)	F.C. Motagua	2	2	0	0	100.00
(Honduras)	C.D. Olimpia	3	3	0	0	100.00
(Mexico)	Club América	2	0	0	2	0.00
(Mexico)	Cruz Azul	2	0	1	1	0.00
(Mexico)	Club León	2	1	0	1	50.00
(Mexico)	C.F. Pachuca	2	0	1	1	0.00
(Mexico)	Pumas UNAM	2	1	1	0	50.00
(Mexico)	Querétaro F.C.	2	1	1	0	50.00
(Mexico)	C.F. Monterrey	3	0	1	2	0.00
(Mexico)	Santos Laguna	2	1	0	1	50.00
(Nicaragua)	Real Estelí FC	4	2	1	1	50.00
(Panama)	C.D. Plaza Amador	2	1	0	1	50.00
(Panama)	Club Libertad	2	0	2	0	0.00
(Peru)	Club Alianza Lima	2	0	2	0	0.00
(Peru)	Juan Aurich	2	2	0	0	100.00
(South Korea)	Ulsan HD FC	1	1	0	0	100.00
(United States)	Columbus Crew	2	0	2	0	0.00
(United States)	FC Cincinnati	2	1	1	0	50.00
(United States)	Houston Dynamo FC	3	3	0	0	100.00
(United States)	Inter Miami CF	2	1	0	1	50.00
(United States)	Los Angeles FC	2	1	0	1	50.00
(United States)	LA Galaxy	2	1	1	0	50.00
(United States)	New York City FC	3	2	0	1	66.67
(United States)	Orlando City SC	4	1	3	0	25.00
(United States)	Portland Timbers	1	1	0	0	100.00
(United States)	Real Salt Lake	2	1	1	0	50.00
(United States)	San Diego FC	1	1	0	0	100.00
(United States)	San Jose Earthquakes	1	1	0	0	100.00
(United States)	Seattle Sounders FC	2	1	0	1	50.00
(United States)	Soccer Universidad AC	2	2	0	0	100.00
(Venezuela)	Caracas F.C.	2	2	0	0	100.00
