= Joaquim Henrique =

Brazilian footballer

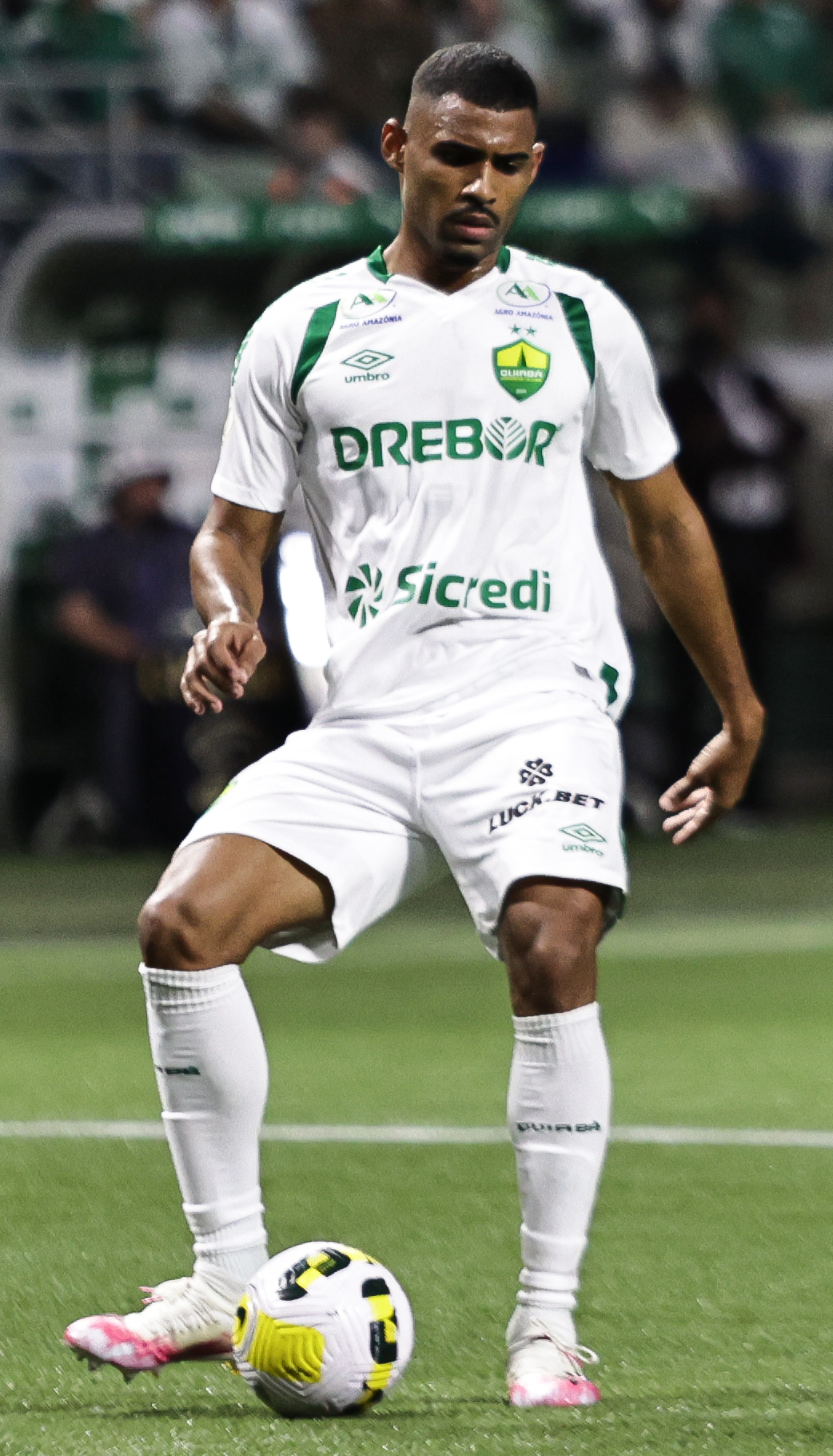
- Joaquim with Cuiabá in 2022

Personal information
- Full name: Joaquim Henrique Pereira Silva
- Date of birth: 28 December 1998 (age 27)
- Place of birth: Nova Era, Brazil
- Height: 1.87 m (6 ft 2 in)
- Position: Centre back

Team information
- Current team: Tigres UANL
- Number: 28

Youth career
- Comercial de Nova Era
- 2017–2018: URT

Senior career*
| Years | Team | Apps | (Gls) |
| 2019 | Paulista | 26 | (4) |
| 2020 | Murici | 10 | (0) |
| 2020 | São José-SP | 15 | (1) |
| 2021 | Botafogo-PB | 0 | (0) |
| 2021–2023 | Cuiabá | 28 | (1) |
| 2022 | → Botafogo-SP (loan) | 13 | (0) |
| 2023–2024 | Santos | 62 | (4) |
| 2024– | Tigres UANL | 15 | (0) |
- * Club domestic league appearances and goals as of 1 December 2024

Joaquim Henrique Pereira Silva (born 28 December 1998), also known simply as Joaquim, is a Brazilian professional footballer who plays as a central defender for Liga MX club Tigres UANL.

== Career ==
=== Early career ===
Born in Nova Era, Minas Gerais, Joaquim played for URT as a youth, being a part of the first team squad during the 2018 Série D, but never playing a single first team minute. Ahead of the 2019 season, he moved to a Campeonato Paulista Segunda Divisão club, but was released in two days, and then signed for Paulista in the same division.

After winning the Paulista Segunda Divisão, Joaquim moved to Murici in July 2020. On 21 September of that year, he signed for São José-SP, and also won the fourth division of the Paulista with the club.

On 3 February 2021, Joaquim agreed to a deal with Botafogo-PB. He only played two Copa do Nordeste matches for the side before leaving.

=== Cuiabá ===
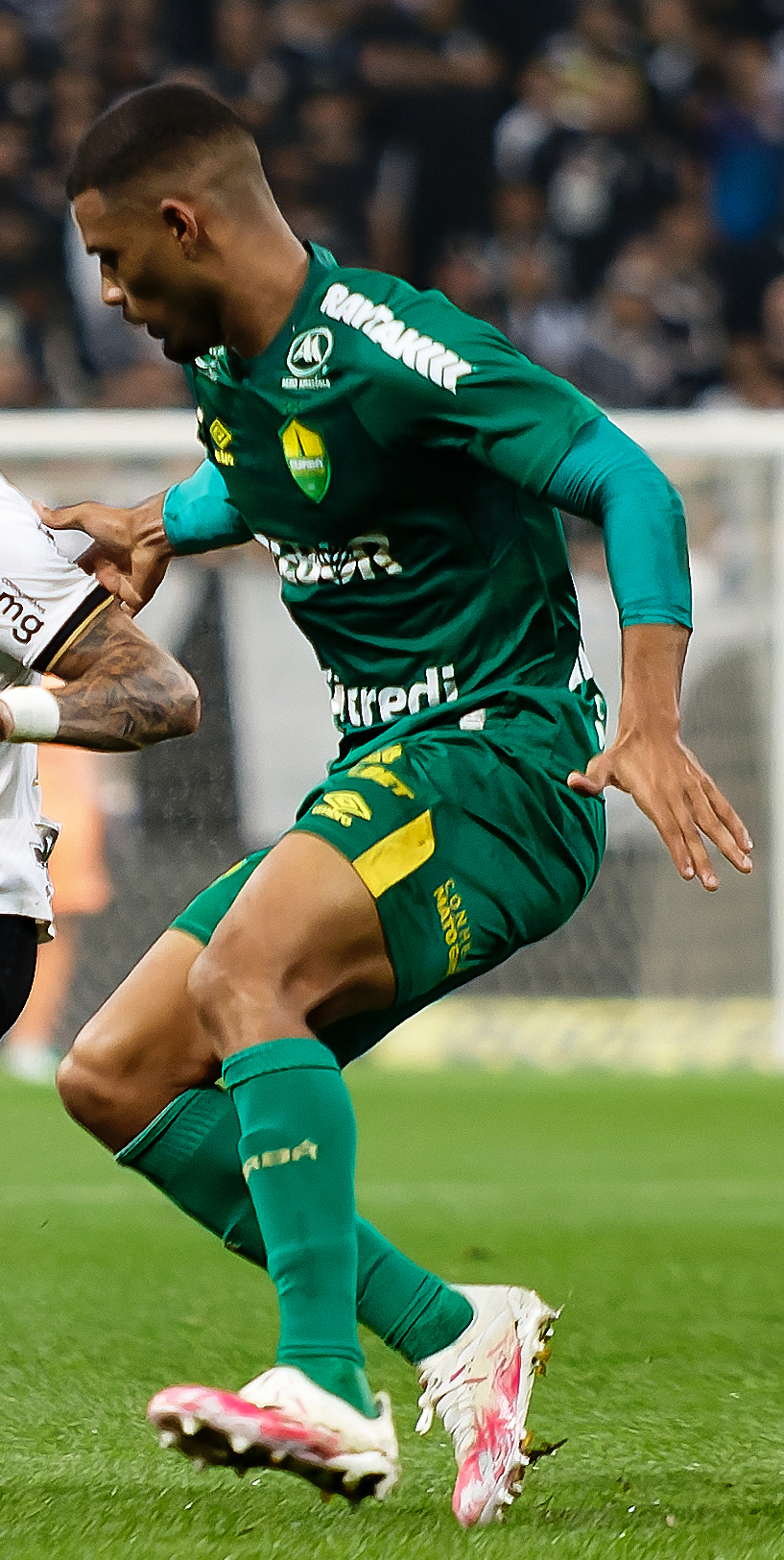
Joaquim with Cuiabá in 2022

On 5 May 2021, Joaquim signed a contract with Série A side Cuiabá until the end of 2023. He was initially assigned to the under-23 squad, before being loaned out to Botafogo-SP on 3 January 2022.

Joaquim returned to Cuiabá on 4 April 2022, being definitely assigned to the main squad. He made his Série A debut on 18 June, starting in a 0–0 home draw against Ceará. On 3 August, after becoming a starter, he renewed his contract until December 2026.

Joaquim scored his first goal in the top tier on 3 July 2022, netting the winner in a 2–1 away success over Avaí. He finished the 2022 season as an undisputed starter, as Cuiabá avoided relegation.

=== Santos ===
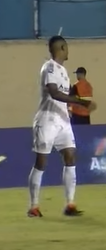
Joaquim in action for Santos in 2024

On 8 February 2023, Joaquim was announced at fellow top tier side Santos, signing a four-year contract. Santos bought 60% of his economic rights for a fee of € 3 million. He made his debut for the club eight days later, starting in a 1–1 Campeonato Paulista away draw against Santo André.

Joaquim scored his first goal on 23 February 2023, netting the winner in a 1–0 away success against Ceilândia, for the year's Copa do Brasil.

=== Tigres UANL ===
On 27 July 2024, Joaquim joined Mexican club Tigres UANL.

== Personal life ==
Joaquim's younger brother Matheus Emiliano is also a footballer. A goalkeeper, he began his career with Palmas.

== Career statistics ==
As of 28 June 2024

| Club | Season | League | | | State League | | Cup | | Continental | | Other | | Total | |
| Club | Season | Division | Apps | Goals | Apps | Goals | Apps | Goals | Apps | Goals | Apps | Goals | Apps | Goals |
|---|---|---|---|---|---|---|---|---|---|---|---|---|---|---|
| Paulista | 2019 | Paulista 2ª Divisão | — | | 26 | 4 | — | | — | | — | | 26 | 4 |
| Murici | 2020 | Alagoano | — | | 10 | 0 | — | | — | | — | | 10 | 0 |
| São José-SP | 2020 | Paulista 2ª Divisão | — | | 15 | 1 | — | | — | | — | | 15 | 1 |
| Botafogo-PB | 2021 | Série C | 0 | 0 | 0 | 0 | 0 | 0 | — | | 2 (Note: Appearance(s) in Copa do Nordeste) | 0 | 2 | 0 |
| Cuiabá | 2021 | Série A | 0 | 0 | — | | — | | — | | 9 (Note: Eight appearances in Copa FMF, one appearance in Copa Verde) | 0 | 9 | 0 |
| Cuiabá | 2022 | Série A | 25 | 1 | — | | — | | 3 (Note: Appearance(s) in Copa Sudamericana) | 0 | — | | 28 | 1 |
| Cuiabá | 2023 | Série A | 0 | 0 | 3 | 0 | 0 | 0 | 0 | 0 | — | | 3 | 0 |
| Cuiabá | Total | | 25 | 1 | 3 | 0 | — | | 3 | 0 | 9 | 0 | 40 | 1 |
| Botafogo-SP (loan) | 2022 | Série C | 0 | 0 | 13 | 0 | 1 | 0 | — | | — | | 14 | 0 |
| Santos | 2023 | Série A | 31 | 1 | 4 | 0 | 3 | 1 | 1 | 0 | — | | 39 | 2 |
| Santos | 2024 | Série B | 12 | 1 | 15 | 2 | — | | — | | — | | 27 | 3 |
| Santos | Total | | 43 | 2 | 19 | 2 | 3 | 1 | 1 | 0 | — | | 66 | 5 |
| Career total | | | 68 | 3 | 86 | 7 | 4 | 1 | 4 | 0 | 11 | 0 | 173 | 11 |

== Honours ==
Paulista

- Campeonato Paulista Segunda Divisão: 2019

São José-SP

- Campeonato Paulista Segunda Divisão: 2020

Santos

- Campeonato Brasileiro Série B: 2024

Individual

- Campeonato Paulista Team of the Year: 2024
- Liga MX All-Star: 2025
- Liga MX Best XI: Apertura 2025
- CONCACAF Champions Cup Best XI: 2026
