= 2025 Campeón de Campeones =

- Match programme cover
- Event: 2025 Campeón de Campeones
| América | Toluca |
| 1 | 3 |
- Date: 20 July 2025
- Venue: Dignity Health Sports Park, Carson, United States
- Man of the Match: Alexis Vega (Toluca)
- Referee: Víctor Alfonso Cáceres (Chiapas)

The 2025 Campeón de Campeones was the 52nd edition of the Campeón de Campeones, an annual football super cup match. It took place on 20 July 2025 between América, the Apertura 2024 champion, and Toluca, the Clausura 2025 champion. The match took place at Dignity Health Sports Park in Carson, California, hosting for the seventh time. Like previous editions, the Campeón de Campeones was contested at a neutral venue in the United States.

Toluca defeated América 3–1 to capture their fifth title and qualified for the 2025 Campeones Cup, facing the MLS Cup 2024 champions LA Galaxy at Dignity Health Sports Park in Carson.

== Background ==
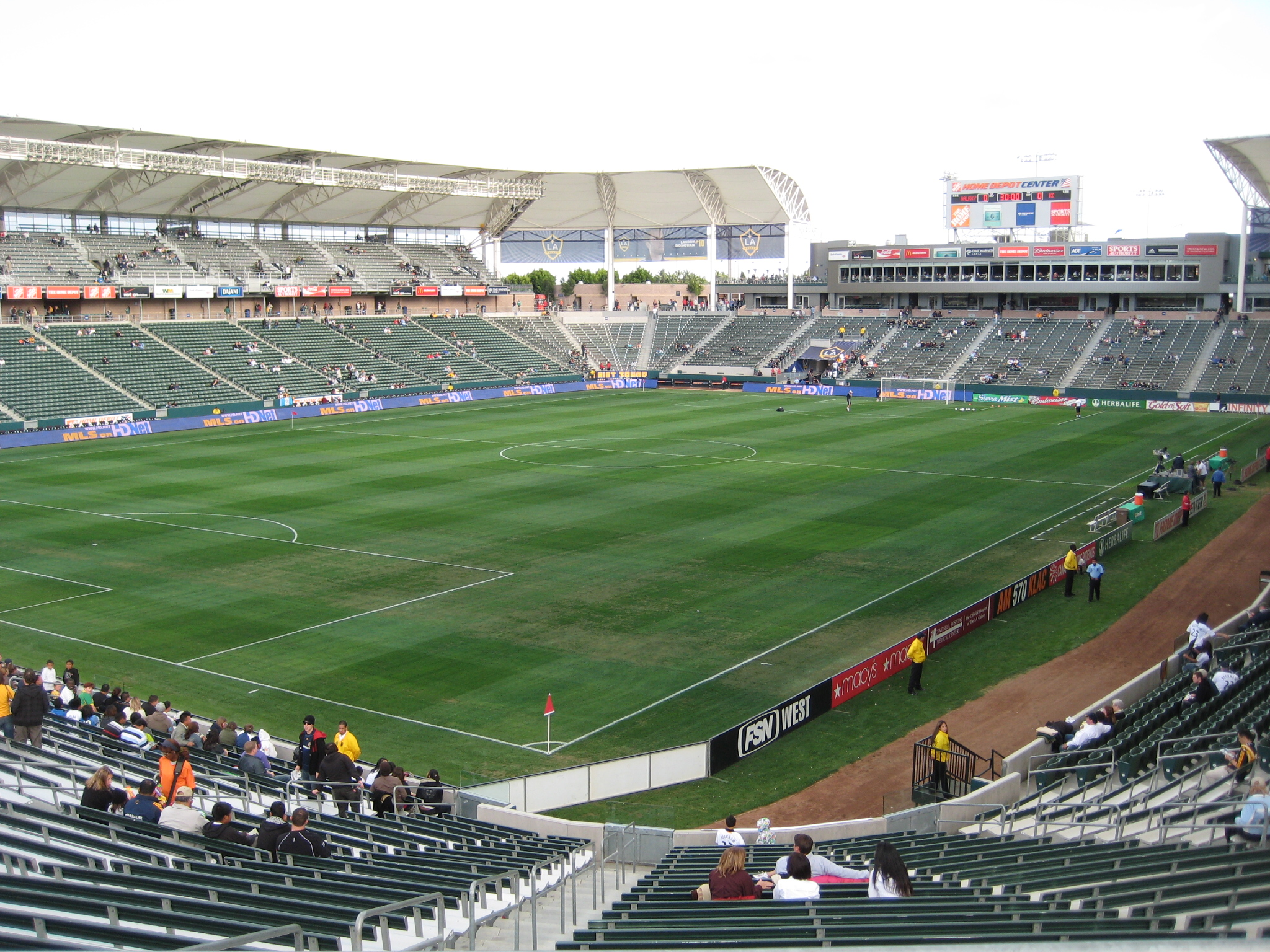
Dignity Health Sports Park in Carson hosted the match.

América qualified for the Campeón de Campeones as winners of the Apertura 2024, having defeated Monterrey 3–2 on aggregate in the finals following a 2–1 victory in the first-leg and a 1–1 draw in the return leg. The club entered the match as the reigning Campeón de Campeones, having won the title in the 2024 edition. Toluca secured their spot after winning the Clausura 2025, defeating América 2–0 on aggregate in the finals, with a scoreless draw in the first-leg and a 2–0 win in the second-leg.

The 2025 Campeón de Campeones was held on 20 July 2025 at Dignity Health Sports Park. This was the seventh consecutive edition of the Campeón de Campeones to be hosted at the venue. The match marked as a rematch of the Clausura 2025 finals between the two clubs.

This match was the 52rd edition of the Campeón de Campeones. (Note: The edition number was calculated based on figures provided by Goal.com, with the first Campeón de Campeones having been held in 1941–42.)

== Match details ==
20 July 2025
18:15 PDT

| América | 1–3 | Toluca |
|---|---|---|
| Zendejas 1' | Report | Romero 12'; Méndez 45+5'; Paulinho 70' |

Dignity Health Sports Park, Carson
Referee: Víctor Alfonso Cáceres (Chiapas)

=== Details ===
| América | Toluca |

| GK | 1 | (Mexico) Luis Malagón |
| DF | 3 | (Mexico) Israel Reyes | (yellow card) 60' |
| DF | 26 | (Colombia) Cristian Borja |
| DF | 31 | (Chile) Igor Lichnovsky | (red card) 89' |
| DF | 4 | (Uruguay) Sebastián Cáceres | | (substituted off) 57' |
| MF | 8 | (Spain) Álvaro Fidalgo (c) | (yellow card) 36' | (substituted off) 90+4' |
| MF | 12 | (Mexico) Isaías Violante | (yellow card) 45+3' | (substituted off) 58' |
| MF | 28 | (Mexico) Erick Sánchez | | (substituted off) 58' |
| MF | 17 | (United States) Alejandro Zendejas | | (substituted off) 90+4' |
| MF | 7 | (Uruguay) Brian Rodríguez |
| FW | 27 | (Uruguay) Rodrigo Aguirre |
Substitutions:
| GK | 30 | (Mexico) Rodolfo Cota |
| DF | 5 | (Mexico) Kevin Álvarez | | (substituted on) 58' |
| DF | 15 | (Mexico) Ralph Orquin |
| DF | 29 | (Mexico) Ramón Juárez | | (substituted on) 90+4' |
| MF | 6 | (Mexico) Jonathan dos Santos |
| MF | 13 | (Mexico) Alan Cervantes | | (substituted on) 90+4' |
| MF | 20 | (Mexico) Alexis Gutiérrez | | (substituted on) 57' |
| FW | 9 | (Mexico) Henry Martín |
| FW | 11 | (Chile) Víctor Dávila |
| FW | 19 | (Colombia) Raúl Zúñiga | | (substituted on) 58' |
Manager:
(Brazil) André Jardine

| GK | 22 | (Mexico) Luis García |
| DF | 2 | (Mexico) Diego Barbosa |
| DF | 4 | (Uruguay) Bruno Méndez |
| DF | 13 | (Brazil) Luan |
| DF | 6 | (Uruguay) Federico Pereira | (yellow card) 78' |
| DF | 20 | (Mexico) Jesús Gallardo |
| MF | 5 | (Argentina) Franco Romero | (yellow card) 47' |
| MF | 10 | (Mexico) Jesús Angulo | | (substituted off) 73' |
| MF | 14 | (Mexico) Marcel Ruiz | (yellow card) 9' | (substituted off) 64' |
| FW | 26 | (Portugal) Paulinho | | (substituted off) 73' |
| FW | 9 | (Mexico) Alexis Vega (c) | (yellow card) 31' | (substituted off) 90+1' |
Substitutions:
| GK | 1 | (Mexico) Hugo González |
| DF | 3 | (Mexico) Antonio Briseño |
| DF | 17 | (Mexico) Mauricio Isais |
| MF | 25 | (Mexico) Everardo López |
| MF | 7 | (Mexico) Juan Pablo Domínguez | | (substituted on) 88' |
| MF | 8 | (Argentina) Nicolás Castro | | (substituted on) 64' |
| MF | 16 | (Mexico) Héctor Herrera | | (substituted on) 90+1' |
| MF | 11 | (Brazil) Helinho | | (substituted on) 73' (substituted off) 88' |
| FW | 23 | (Mexico) Oswaldo Virgen |
| FW | 31 | (Paraguay) Robert Morales | | (substituted on) 73' |
Manager:
(Argentina) Antonio Mohamed
