= Ricardo Moreno Bastida =

Mexican politician

- Born: 2 June 1969 (age 56); El Oro, State of Mexico, Mexico
- Education: UAEM
- Occupation: Politician
- Political party: PRD

Ricardo Moreno Bastida (born 2 June 1969) is a Mexican politician from the Party of the Democratic Revolution. From 2000 to 2003, he served as Deputy of the LVIII Legislature of the Mexican Congress representing the State of Mexico.
