= Jorge Díaz Price =

Mexican footballer

Jorge Díaz
Personal information
- Full name: Jorge Roberto Díaz Price
- Date of birth: 27 July 1998 (age 28)
- Place of birth: Benito Juárez, Quintana Roo, Mexico
- Height: 1.76 m (5 ft 9 1/2 in)
- Position: Midfielder

Team information
- Current team: Toluca
- Number: 29

Youth career
- 2013: Atlante
- 2016–2017: Yalmakán
- 2017–2018: León

Senior career*
Years	Team	Apps	(Gls)
2018–2023	León	37	(0)
2020–2021	→ Everton (loan)	24	(0)
2023	→ Yalmakán (loan)	14	(5)
2024–2025	Cancún	56	(12)
2026–	Toluca	11	(2)
- * Club domestic league appearances and goals as of 28 August 2022

Jorge Roberto Díaz Price (born 27 July 1998) is a Mexican professional footballer who plays as a midfielder for Liga MX club Toluca.

== Career ==
Born in Cancún, Quintana Roo, Díaz made his debut in Mexico's top flight with León in 2018. He earned the distinction of Best Rookie of the 2018 Clausura Tournament.

Between 2020 and 2023, Díaz spent time on loan with Everton in Chile and Yalmakán FC in the Liga Premier. In 2024, he secured a permanent move to Cancún FC, competing in the Liga de Expansión.

In January 2026, Díaz signed with Toluca.

== Career statistics ==
=== Club ===
As of 28 August 2022

Club	Season	League			Cup		Continental		Other		Total	
Club	Season	Division	Apps	Goals	Apps	Goals	Apps	Goals	Apps	Goals	Apps	Goals
León	2017–18	Liga MX	11	0	6	0	—		—		17	0
León	2018–19	Liga MX	11	0	9	0	—		—		20	0
León	2019–20	Liga MX	6	0	—		—		—		6	0
León	2021–22	Liga MX	4	0	—		—		—		4	0
León	2022–23	Liga MX	5	0	—		—		—		5	0
León	Total		37	0	15	0	0	0	0	0	52	0
Everton (loan)	2020–21	Chilean Primera División	24	0	–		–		–		24	0
Career total			61	0	15	0	0	0	0	0	76	0

== Honours ==
León

- CONCACAF Champions League: 2023

Toluca

- CONCACAF Champions Cup: 2026
- Leagues Cup: 2026
