= 2026 CONCACAF Champions Cup =

61st season of the CONCACAF club football tournament

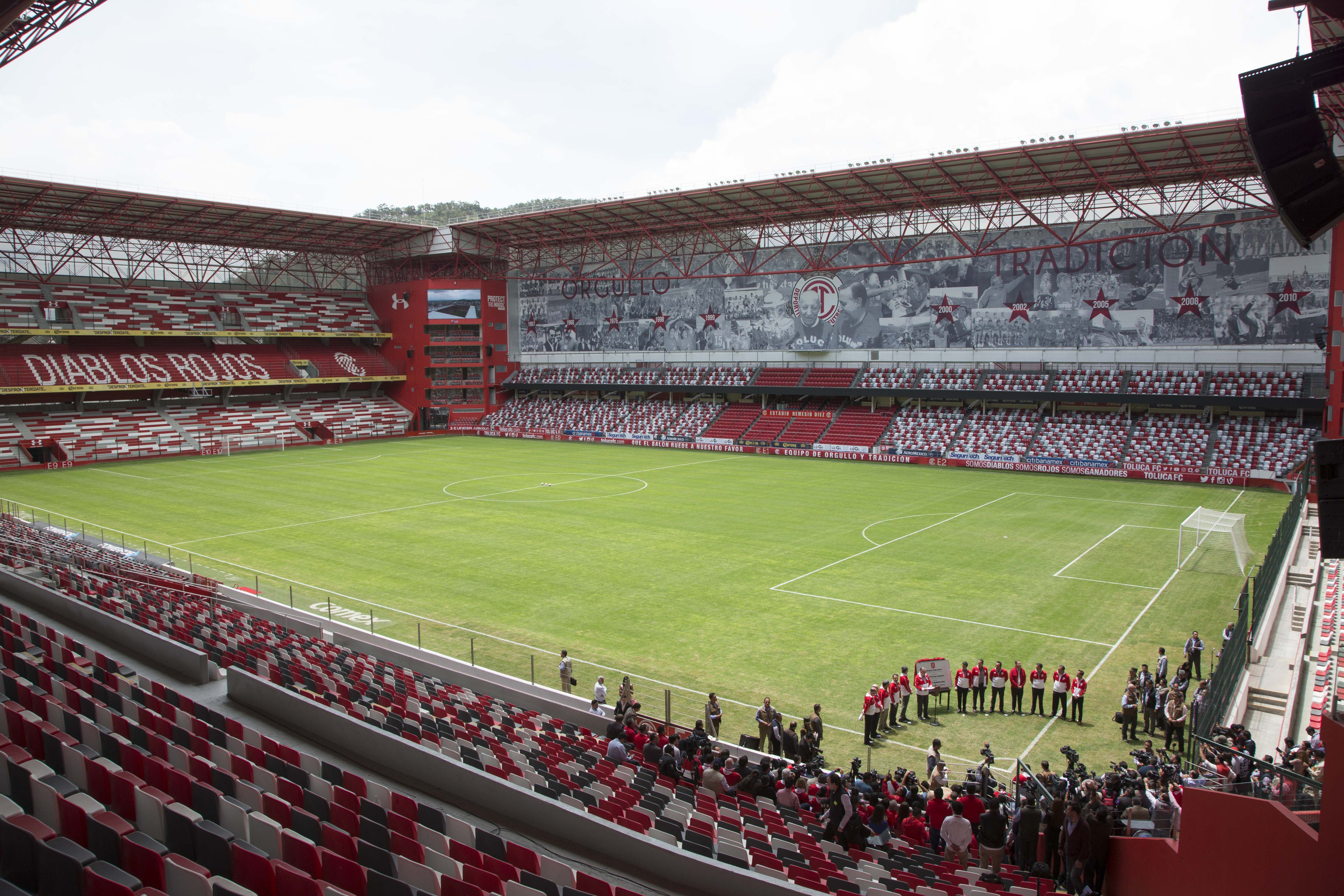
- Nemesio Diez Stadium in Toluca hosted the final

Tournament details
- Dates: 3 February – 30 May
- Teams: 27 (from 10 associations)

Final positions
- Champions: (Mexico) Toluca (3rd title)
- Runners-up: (Mexico) Tigres UANL

Tournament statistics
- Matches played: 51
- Goals scored: 149 (2.92 per match)
- Attendance: 730,216 (14,318 per match)
- Top scorer(s): (Portugal) Paulinho (Toluca); 8 goals
- Best player: (Portugal) Paulinho (Toluca)
- Best young player: (Venezuela) David Martínez (Los Angeles FC)
- Best goalkeeper: (Mexico) Luis García (Toluca)
- Fair play award: (United States Soccer Federation) Nashville SC

The 2026 CONCACAF Champions Cup was the 61st season of the CONCACAF Champions Cup, the premier men's club association football tournament for North, Central America, and the Caribbean organized by CONCACAF. It was a five-round knockout tournament, with 27 teams qualified based on their national and zonal league and cup competitions; the first four rounds were played as a two-legged series at the home stadiums of the respective teams, ending with a one-legged final.

Toluca and Tigres UANL met in the final at the Nemesio Diez Stadium, with the host earning the right to stage the match for a superior goal difference in the earlier rounds. The match finished 1–1 after extra time. Toluca prevailed 6–5 on penalties, earning a direct qualification to the 2029 FIFA Club World Cup and the 2026 FIFA Intercontinental Cup.

== Qualification ==
Twenty-seven teams qualified for the tournament, with five qualifying directly to the round of 16. The remaining 22 teams entered in round one.

In addition to national league competitions in the United States, Mexico, and Canada, 12 of 27 berths were determined by international competitions, including the 2025 Leagues Cup (three), 2025 CONCACAF Caribbean Cup (three), and 2025 CONCACAF Central American Cup (six).

Two Canadian Premier League teams qualified automatically, while the United States-only 2025 U.S. Open Cup knockout competition and Canada-only equivalent, the 2025 Canadian Championship, provided one berth each.

The winners of the three international competitions, along with the winner of MLS Cup 2025 and champion of the 2024–25 Liga MX season, received the five byes into the round of 16.

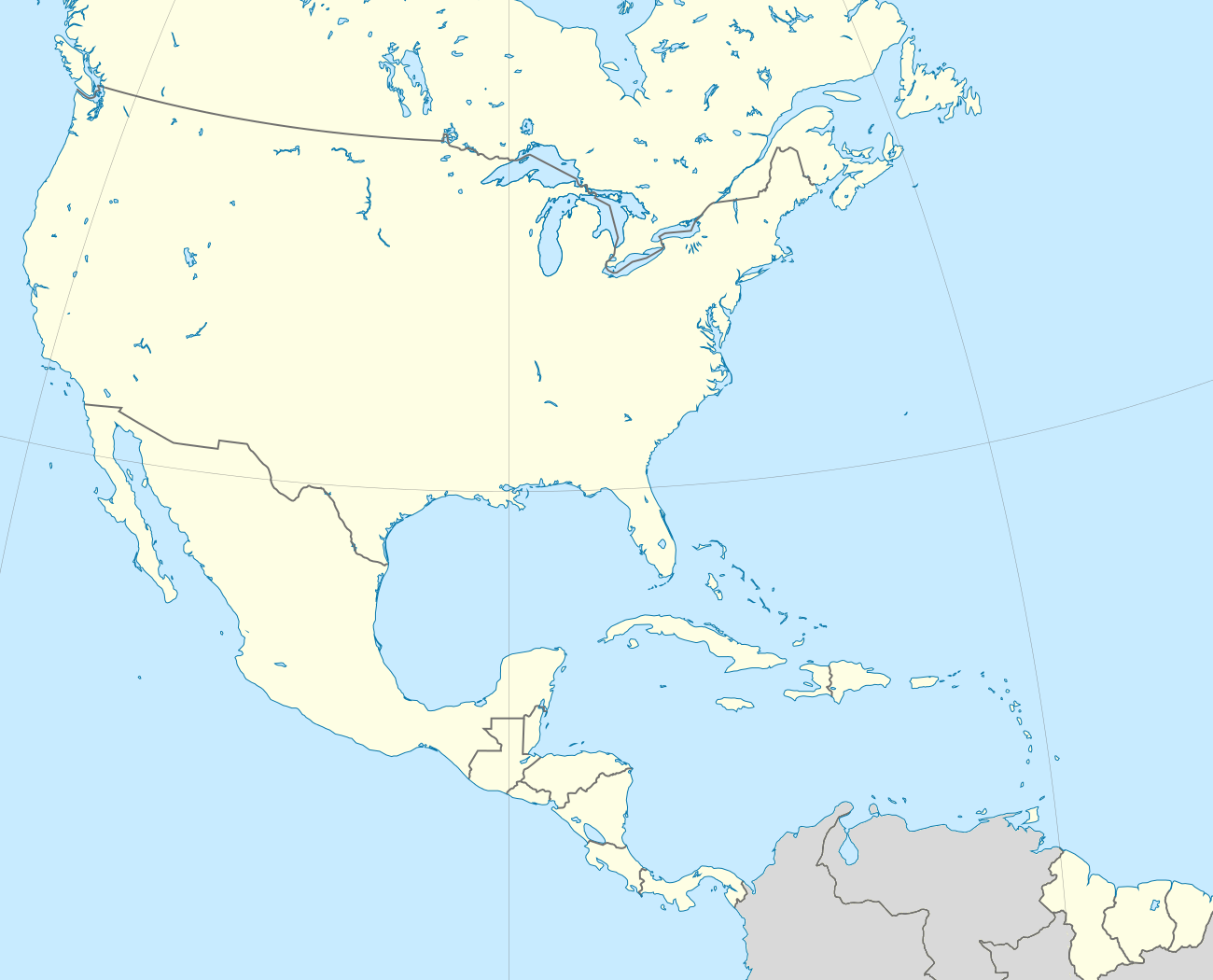
Location of teams of the 2026 CONCACAF Champions Cup
North American Zone Central American Zone Caribbean Zone

=== Distribution ===
Twenty-seven teams (from ten associations) qualified for the tournament.

- North American Zone: 18 teams (from three associations)
- Central American Zone: 6 teams (from four associations)
- Caribbean Zone: 3 teams (from three associations)

Five teams received a bye into the round of 16.

- The champion of the regional competitions for each of CONCACAF's constituent zones; North American, Central American, and Caribbean
- The champions of Liga MX of Mexico and Major League Soccer of the United States and Canada (Liga MX had a split Apertura and Clausura system, so the champion team with the higher aggregate points took this place. If a team won both Apertura and Clausura, they took this place.)

The remaining 22 teams entered in round one.

- The runners-up and third-place team from the MLS–Liga MX Leagues Cup
- The runners-up and third-place team from the Caribbean Cup
- The runners-up, remaining semi-finalists, and two play-in winners from the Central American Cup
- The U.S. Open Cup winners
- The Canadian Championship winners
- The Canadian Premier League regular season winners and playoff champions
- The remaining winner with the worse record, two runners-up, and the two best next clubs by season aggregate from Liga MX
- The MLS Supporters' Shield winners
- The remaining MLS Conference regular-season leader, and the next two teams in the Supporters' Shield table

== Teams ==
The following table includes the number of appearances, last appearance, and previous best from the CONCACAF Champions Cup tournament.

Teams entering in round of 16 (5)
Competition	Team	Qualifying method	App. (last)	Previous best (last)
Caribbean Cup	(Jamaica) Mount Pleasant	2025 Caribbean Cup champions	1st	Debut
Central American Cup	(Costa Rica) Alajuelense	2025 Central American Cup champions	29th (2025)	Champions (2004)
Leagues Cup	(United States) Seattle Sounders FC	2025 Leagues Cup champions	9th (2025)	Champions (2022)
Liga MX	(Mexico) Toluca	2024–25 Liga MX Clausura winners with the higher aggregate table points	14th (2024)	Champions (2003)
Major League Soccer	(United States) Inter Miami CF	MLS Cup 2025 champions	3rd (2025)	Semi-finals (2025)

Teams entering in round one (22)
Competition	Team	Qualifying method	App. (last)	Previous best (last)
Canadian Championship	(Canada) Vancouver FC	2025 Canadian Championship runners-up	1st	Debut
Canadian Premier League (2 berths)	(Canada) Atlético Ottawa	2025 Canadian Premier League champions	1st	Debut
Canadian Premier League (2 berths)	(Canada) Forge FC	2025 CPL Shield winners	4th (2025)	Round of 16 (2022)
Caribbean Cup (2 berths)	(Dominican Republic) O&M	2025 Caribbean Cup finalists	1st	Debut
Caribbean Cup (2 berths)	(Trinidad and Tobago) Defence Force	2025 Caribbean Cup third place	13th (2002)	Champions (1985)
Central American Cup (5 berths)	(Guatemala) Xelajú	2025 Central American Cup runners-up	7th (2012–13)	Quarter-finals (2012–13)
Central American Cup (5 berths)	(Honduras) Real España	2025 Central American Cup semi-finalists	14th (2023)	Round of 16 (2023)
Central American Cup (5 berths)	(Honduras) Olimpia	2025 Central American Cup semi-finalists	39th (2023)	Champions (1988)
Central American Cup (5 berths)	(Costa Rica) Cartaginés	2025 Central American Cup play-in winners	8th (2013–14)	Champions (1994)
Central American Cup (5 berths)	(Panama) Sporting San Miguelito	2025 Central American Cup play-in winners	2nd (2013–14)	Group stage (2013–14)
Leagues Cup (1 berth)	(United States) LA Galaxy	2025 Leagues Cup third place	12th (2025)	Champions (2000)
Liga MX (5 berths)	(Mexico) América	2024–25 Liga MX Apertura winners with the lower aggregate table points and Clausura runners-up	17th (2025)	Champions (2015–16)
Liga MX (5 berths)	(Mexico) Monterrey	2024–25 Liga MX Apertura runners-up	13th (2025)	Champions (2021)
Liga MX (5 berths)	(Mexico) Cruz Azul	Next three best clubs in 2024–25 Liga MX aggregate table	19th (2025)	Champions (2025)
Liga MX (5 berths)	(Mexico) Tigres UANL	Next three best clubs in 2024–25 Liga MX aggregate table	13th (2025)	Champions (2020)
Liga MX (5 berths)	(Mexico) Pumas UNAM	Next three best clubs in 2024–25 Liga MX aggregate table	13th (2025)	Champions (1989)
Major League Soccer (5 berths)	(United States) Philadelphia Union	2025 Major League Soccer Supporters' Shield winners	4th (2024)	Semi-finals (2023)
Major League Soccer (5 berths)	(United States) San Diego FC	2025 Major League Soccer Western Conference regular season winners	1st	Debut
Major League Soccer (5 berths)	(Canada) Vancouver Whitecaps FC	Next best clubs in the 2025 Supporters' Shield standings	6th (2025)	Runners-up (2025)
Major League Soccer (5 berths)	(United States) FC Cincinnati	Next best clubs in the 2025 Supporters' Shield standings	3rd (2025)	Round of 16 (2025)
Major League Soccer (5 berths)	(United States) Los Angeles FC	Next best clubs in the 2025 Supporters' Shield standings	4th (2025)	Runners-up (2023)
U.S. Open Cup	(United States) Nashville SC	2025 U.S. Open Cup winners	2nd (2024)	Round of 16 (2024)

1. Canada (CAN): Vancouver FC qualified as runners-up because champions Vancouver Whitecaps FC already qualified through MLS standings.
2. Mexico (MEX): Because América won the Liga MX Apertura and were runners-up in the Clausura, a spot went to Pumas UNAM, the third-best team in the aggregate table not already qualified.
3. Major League Soccer (MLS): Los Angeles FC, the highest-ranked club in the 2025 MLS Supporters' Shield standings not already qualified, filled the vacancy left by both MLS Cup finalists.

== Draw ==
The draw for the tournament took place on 9 December 2025 in Miami. The ceremony was streamed on CONCACAF's YouTube channel and broadcast live on Fox Sports in the United States and Mexico and ESPN in most of the Americas. Teams were seeded and placed in draw pots based on their CONCACAF club ranking as of 8 December 2025.

The champions of CONCACAF's three regional cup competitions, as well as the Liga MX winners with the most accumulated points and the MLS Cup winners, received a bye to the round of 16. The three remaining highest-ranked clubs were pre-seeded into a round one bracket position.

Entering in round of 16
Seed	Team	Ranking points
1	(Mexico) Toluca	1253
2	(United States) Inter Miami CF	1249
3	(United States) Seattle Sounders FC	1217
4	(Costa Rica) Alajuelense	1175
5	(Jamaica) Mount Pleasant	1082

Seeded in Round one
Seed	Team	Ranking points
1	(Mexico) Cruz Azul	1262
2	(Mexico) Tigres UANL	1241
3	(Mexico) América	1234

Pot 1
Team	Ranking points
(Canada) Vancouver Whitecaps FC	1233
(United States) Los Angeles FC	1222
(Mexico) Monterrey	1216
(United States) Philadelphia Union	1205
(United States) FC Cincinnati	1202
(United States) LA Galaxy	1184
(United States) Nashville SC	1182
(Mexico) Pumas UNAM	1182

Pot 2
Team	Ranking points
(United States) San Diego FC	1171
(Honduras) Olimpia	1155
(Canada) Forge FC	1121
(Canada) Atlético Ottawa	1111
(Costa Rica) Cartaginés	1106
(Guatemala) Xelajú	1102
(Panama) Sporting San Miguelito	1093
(Honduras) Real España	1088
(Trinidad and Tobago) Defence Force	1051
(Canada) Vancouver FC	1041
(Dominican Republic) O&M	996

== Schedule ==
The competition schedule was as follows.

Round	First leg	Second leg
Round one	3–4 and 17–19 February	10–12 and 24–26 February
Round of 16	10–12 March	17–19 March
Quarter-finals	7–8 April	14–15 April
Semi-finals	28–29 April	5–6 May
Final	30 May	

Times are EST or EDT, (Note: EST (UTC−5) for dates up to 8 March 2026 (round one), and EDT (UTC−4) for dates thereafter.) as listed by CONCACAF (local times, if different, are in parentheses).

== Bracket ==
Round one
(United States) San Diego FC	4	0	4
(Mexico) Pumas UNAM	1	1	2
(Panama) Sporting San Miguelito	1	0	1
(United States) LA Galaxy (a)	1	0	1
(Canada) Vancouver FC	0	0	0
(Mexico) Cruz Azul	3	5	8
(Guatemala) Xelajú	1	0	1
(Mexico) Monterrey	1	2	3
(Honduras) Real España	1	0	1
(United States) Los Angeles FC	6	1	7
(Canada) Atlético Ottawa	0	0	0
(United States) Nashville SC	2	5	7
(Honduras) Olimpia	1	0	1
(Mexico) América	2	0	2
(Trinidad and Tobago) Defence Force	0	0	0
(United States) Philadelphia Union	5	7	12
(Canada) Forge FC	0	1	1
(Mexico) Tigres UANL	0	4	4
(Dominican Republic) O&M	0	0	0
(United States) FC Cincinnati	4	9	13
(Costa Rica) Cartaginés	0	0	0
(Canada) Vancouver Whitecaps FC	0	2	2

Round of 16
(United States) San Diego FC	3	0	3
(Mexico) Toluca	2	4	6
(United States) LA Galaxy	3	3	6
(Jamaica) Mount Pleasant	0	0	0
(Mexico) Cruz Azul	3	1	4
(Mexico) Monterrey	2	1	3
(United States) Los Angeles FC	1	2	3
(Costa Rica) Alajuelense	1	1	2
(United States) Nashville SC (a)	0	1	1
(United States) Inter Miami CF	0	1	1
(Mexico) América	1	1	2
(United States) Philadelphia Union	0	1	1
(Mexico) Tigres UANL	0	5	5
(United States) FC Cincinnati	3	1	4
(Canada) Vancouver Whitecaps FC	0	1	1
(United States) Seattle Sounders FC	3	2	5

Quarter-finals
(Mexico) Toluca	4	3	7
(United States) LA Galaxy	2	0	2
(Mexico) Cruz Azul	0	1	1
(United States) Los Angeles FC	3	1	4
(United States) Nashville SC	0	1	1
(Mexico) América	0	0	0
(Mexico) Tigres UANL (a)	2	1	3
(United States) Seattle Sounders FC	0	3	3

Semi-finals
(Mexico) Toluca	1	4	5
(United States) Los Angeles FC	2	0	2
(United States) Nashville SC	0	0	0
(Mexico) Tigres UANL	1	1	2

Final
(Mexico) Toluca (p)	1 (6)
(Mexico) Tigres UANL	1 (5)

== Round one ==
=== Summary ===
Round one was played during four weekly windows: on 3–4 February, 10–12 February, 17–19 February, and 24–26 February.

Team 1	Agg.	Team 2	1st leg	2nd leg
San Diego FC (United States)	4–2	(Mexico) Pumas UNAM	4–1	0–1
Sporting San Miguelito (Panama)	1–1 (a)	(United States) LA Galaxy	1–1	0–0
Vancouver FC (Canada)	0–8	(Mexico) Cruz Azul	0–3	0–5
Xelajú (Guatemala)	1–3	(Mexico) Monterrey	1–1	0–2
Real España (Honduras)	1–7	(United States) Los Angeles FC	1–6	0–1
Atlético Ottawa (Canada)	0–7	(United States) Nashville SC	0–2	0–5
Olimpia (Honduras)	1–2	(Mexico) América	1–2	0–0
Defence Force (Trinidad and Tobago)	0–12	(United States) Philadelphia Union	0–5	0–7
Cartaginés (Costa Rica)	0–2	(Canada) Vancouver Whitecaps FC	0–0	0–2
O&M (Dominican Republic)	0–13	(United States) FC Cincinnati	0–4	0–9
Forge FC (Canada)	1–4	(Mexico) Tigres UANL	0–0	1–4

=== Matches ===
3 February 2026
23:00 (20:00 UTC−8)

San Diego FC (United States)	4–1	(Mexico) Pumas UNAM
Duah 68'; Vazquez 76'; Mighten 81'; Bombino 86'	Report	Morales 11'

Snapdragon Stadium, San Diego
Attendance: 19,133
Referee: Mario Escobar (Guatemala)
10 February 2026
20:00 (19:00 UTC−6)

Pumas UNAM (Mexico)	1–0	(United States) San Diego FC
Vite 47'	Report

Estadio Olímpico Universitario, Mexico City
Attendance: 11,934
Referee: Saíd Martínez (Honduras)

San Diego FC won 4–2 on aggregate.

19 February 2026
20:00

Sporting San Miguelito (Panama)	1–1	(United States) LA Galaxy
Tello 37'	Report	Paintsil 68'

Estadio Universitario, Penonomé
Attendance: 4,064
Referee: Nelson Salgado (Guatemala)
25 February 2026
23:30 (20:30 UTC−8)

LA Galaxy (United States)	0–0	(Panama) Sporting San Miguelito
	Report

Dignity Health Sports Park, Carson
Attendance: 11,603
Referee: Iván Barton (El Salvador)

1–1 on aggregate. LA Galaxy won on away goals.

4 February 2026
22:00 (19:00 UTC−8)

Vancouver FC (Canada)	0–3	(Mexico) Cruz Azul
	Report	Paradela 22'; Morales 44'; Palavecino 65'

Willoughby Stadium, Langley
Attendance: 6,038
Referee: José Torres (Puerto Rico)
12 February 2026
20:00 (19:00 UTC−6)

Cruz Azul (Mexico)	5–0	(Canada) Vancouver FC
Romero 37', 45+1', 62'; Rodarte 68'; Ibáñez 74'	Report

Estadio Cuauhtémoc, Puebla
Attendance: 4,647
Referee: Tori Penso (United States)

Cruz Azul won 8–0 on aggregate.

4 February 2026
20:00 (19:00 UTC−6)

Xelajú (Guatemala)	1–1	(Mexico) Monterrey
Escobar 83'	Report	Corona 90+2'

Estadio Cementos Progreso, Guatemala City
Attendance: 3,086
Referee: Filip Dujic (Canada)
11 February 2026
22:00 (21:00 UTC−6)

Monterrey (Mexico)	2–0	(Guatemala) Xelajú
Fimbres 33'; Ocampos 83' (pen.)	Report

Estadio BBVA, Monterrey
Attendance: 16,448
Referee: Pierre-Luc Lauzière (Canada)

Monterrey won 3–1 on aggregate.

17 February 2026
22:00 (21:00 UTC−6)

Real España (Honduras)	1–6	(United States) Los Angeles FC
Jean-Baptiste 50'	Report	Bouanga 3' (pen.), 24', 71'; Martínez 11'; Son Heung-min 22' (pen.); Tillman 39'

Estadio Francisco Morazán, San Pedro Sula
Attendance: 11,530
Referee: Marco Ortíz (Mexico)
24 February 2026
22:00 (19:00 UTC−8)

Los Angeles FC (United States)	1–0	(Honduras) Real España
Tafari 64'	Report

BMO Stadium, Los Angeles
Attendance: 7,972
Referee: Oshane Nation (Jamaica)

Los Angeles FC won 7–1 on aggregate.

17 February 2026
20:00

Atlético Ottawa (Canada)	0–2	(United States) Nashville SC
	Report	Pacius 66'; Surridge 90+5'

Hamilton Stadium, Hamilton (Note: Atlético Ottawa played their home round one match at Hamilton Stadium instead of their regular stadium, TD Place Stadium, Ottawa, which was being renovated.)
Attendance: 290
Referee: Steven Madrigal (Costa Rica)
24 February 2026
20:00 (19:00 UTC−6)

Nashville SC (United States)	5–0	(Canada) Atlético Ottawa
Muyl 21'; Knight 36'; Pacius 55'; Maher 63'; Qasem 83'	Report

Geodis Park, Nashville
Attendance: 11,849
Referee: Selvin Brown (Honduras)

Nashville SC won 7–0 on aggregate.

3 February 2026
21:00 (20:00 UTC−6)

Olimpia (Honduras)	1–2	(Mexico) América
Álvarez 50'	Report	Dávila 45+2'; Juárez 88'

Estadio Chelato Uclés, Tegucigalpa
Attendance: 13,274
Referee: Ismail Elfath (United States)
11 February 2026
20:00 (19:00 UTC−6)

América (Mexico)	0–0	(Honduras) Olimpia
	Report

Estadio Ciudad de los Deportes, Mexico City
Attendance: 19,889
Referee: Drew Fischer (Canada)

América won 2–1 on aggregate.

18 February 2026
18:00 (19:00 UTC−4)

Defence Force (Trinidad and Tobago)	0–5	(United States) Philadelphia Union
	Report	Iloski 29'; Alladoh 32'; Makhanya 64'; Damiani 69', 81' (pen.)

Hasely Crawford Stadium, Port of Spain
Attendance: 1,428
Referee: Reon Radix (Grenada)
26 February 2026
19:00

Philadelphia Union (United States)	7–0	(Trinidad and Tobago) Defence Force
Martínez 7'; Lukić 10' (pen.); Korzeniowski 12', 48'; Bender 53'; C. Sullivan 76', 88'	Report

Subaru Park, Chester
Attendance: 11,467
Referee: Julio Luna (Guatemala)

Philadelphia Union won 12–0 on aggregate.

18 February 2026
22:00 (21:00 UTC−6)

Cartaginés (Costa Rica)	0–0	(Canada) Vancouver Whitecaps FC
	Report

Estadio José Rafael Fello Meza Ivankovich, Cartago
Attendance: 3,733
Referee: Bryan López (Guatemala)
25 February 2026
21:30 (18:30 UTC−8)

Vancouver Whitecaps FC (Canada)	2–0	(Costa Rica) Cartaginés
Cabrera 58'; Berhalter 80'	Report

BC Place, Vancouver
Attendance: 15,517
Referee: Marco Ortíz (Mexico)

Vancouver Whitecaps FC won 2–0 on aggregate.

18 February 2026
20:00 (21:00 UTC−4)

O&M (Dominican Republic)	0–4	(United States) FC Cincinnati
	Report	Barlow 12'; Denkey 33'; Jabbari 86', 90+2'

Estadio Cibao, Santiago de los Caballeros
Attendance: 252
Referee: Steffon Dewar (Jamaica)
25 February 2026
19:00

FC Cincinnati (United States)	9–0	(Dominican Republic) O&M
Mboma Dem 18', 58'; Valenzuela 27'; Castillo 33' (o.g.); Barlow 35'; Chávez 48'; Jimenez 68'; Powell 78'; Chirilă 86'	Report

TQL Stadium, Cincinnati
Attendance: 11,115
Referee: Katia García (Mexico)

FC Cincinnati won 13–0 on aggregate.

3 February 2026
19:00

Forge FC (Canada)	0–0	(Mexico) Tigres UANL
	Report

Hamilton Stadium, Hamilton
Attendance: 4,560
Referee: Armando Villarreal (United States)
10 February 2026
22:00 (21:00 UTC−6)

Tigres UANL (Mexico)	4–1	(Canada) Forge FC
Aguirre 22', 71'; Correa 81'; Joaquim 86'	Report	Wright 80' (pen.)

Estadio Universitario, San Nicolás de los Garza
Attendance: 22,902
Referee: Juan Gabriel Calderón (Costa Rica)

Tigres UANL won 4–1 on aggregate.

== Round of 16 ==
=== Summary ===
The first legs were played on 10–12 March, and the second legs were played on 17–19 March 2026.

Team 1	Agg.	Team 2	1st leg	2nd leg
San Diego FC (United States)	3–6	(Mexico) Toluca	3–2	0–4
LA Galaxy (United States)	6–0	(Jamaica) Mount Pleasant	3–0	3–0
Monterrey (Mexico)	3–4	(Mexico) Cruz Azul	2–3	1–1
Los Angeles FC (United States)	3–2	(Costa Rica) Alajuelense	1–1	2–1
Nashville SC (United States)	1–1 (a)	(United States) Inter Miami CF	0–0	1–1
Philadelphia Union (United States)	1–2	(Mexico) América	0–1	1–1
FC Cincinnati (United States)	4–5	(Mexico) Tigres UANL	3–0	1–5
Vancouver Whitecaps FC (Canada)	1–5	(United States) Seattle Sounders FC	0–3	1–2

=== Matches ===
11 March 2026
23:30 (20:30 UTC−7)

San Diego FC (United States)	3–2	(Mexico) Toluca
Vazquez 32', 46'; Dreyer 53'	Report	Gallardo 16' (pen.); Helinho 90' (pen.)

Snapdragon Stadium, San Diego
Attendance: 20,652
Referee: Walter López (Guatemala)
18 March 2026
23:00 (21:00 UTC−6)

Toluca (Mexico)	4–0	(United States) San Diego FC
Angulo 43', 59'; Paulinho 56'; Gallardo 90+2'	Report

Nemesio Diez Stadium, Toluca
Attendance: 23,322
Referee: Ismael Cornejo (El Salvador)

Toluca won 6–3 on aggregate.

11 March 2026
21:30 (18:30 UTC−7)

LA Galaxy (United States)	3–0	(Jamaica) Mount Pleasant
Gabriel Pec 6', 89', 90+6'	Report

Dignity Health Sports Park, Carson
Attendance: 4,287
Referee: Reon Radix (Grenada)
19 March 2026
19:00 (18:00 UTC−5)

Mount Pleasant (Jamaica)	0–3	(United States) LA Galaxy
	Report	Klauss 18'; Gabriel Pec 61', 87'

National Stadium, Kingston
Attendance: 1,765
Referee: Kwinsi Williams (Trinidad and Tobago)

LA Galaxy won 6–0 on aggregate.

10 March 2026
21:00 (19:00 UTC−6)

Monterrey (Mexico)	2–3	(Mexico) Cruz Azul
De la Rosa 35', 40'	Report	Lira 25'; Piovi 84' (pen.); Ibáñez 90'

Estadio BBVA, Monterrey
Attendance: 28,889
Referee: Drew Fischer (Canada)
17 March 2026
23:00 (21:00 UTC−6)

Cruz Azul (Mexico)	1–1	(Mexico) Monterrey
Paradela 46'	Report	J. Rodríguez 8'

Estadio Cuauhtémoc, Puebla
Attendance: 10,040
Referee: Joe Dickerson (United States)

Cruz Azul won 4–3 on aggregate.

10 March 2026
23:00 (20:00 UTC−7)

Los Angeles FC (United States)	1–1	(Costa Rica) Alajuelense
Bouanga 56'	Report	Bran 44'

BMO Stadium, Los Angeles
Attendance: 11,275
Referee: Victor Cáceres (Mexico)
17 March 2026
21:00 (19:00 UTC−6)

Alajuelense (Costa Rica)	1–2	(United States) Los Angeles FC
Van der Putten 4'	Report	Ordaz 51'; Martínez 90+2'

Estadio Alejandro Morera Soto, Alajuela
Attendance: 12,608
Referee: Marco Ortíz (Mexico)

Los Angeles FC won 3–2 on aggregate.

11 March 2026
19:30 (18:30 UTC−5)

Nashville SC (United States)	0–0	(United States) Inter Miami CF
	Report

Geodis Park, Nashville
Attendance: 25,616
Referee: Juan Gabriel Calderón (Costa Rica)
18 March 2026
19:00

Inter Miami CF (United States)	1–1	(United States) Nashville SC
Messi 7'	Report	Espinoza 74'

Chase Stadium, Fort Lauderdale
Attendance: 17,263
Referee: Adonai Escobedo (Mexico)

1–1 on aggregate. Nashville SC won on away goals.

10 March 2026
19:00

Philadelphia Union (United States)	0–1	(Mexico) América
	Report	Veiga 20'

Subaru Park, Chester
Attendance: 18,534
Referee: Keylor Herrera (Costa Rica)
18 March 2026
21:00 (19:00 UTC−6)

América (Mexico)	1–1	(United States) Philadelphia Union
Dourado 6'	Report	Bueno 49' (pen.)

Estadio Ciudad de los Deportes, Mexico City
Attendance: 15,841
Referee: Saíd Martínez (Honduras)

América won 2–1 on aggregate.

12 March 2026
20:00

FC Cincinnati (United States)	3–0	(Mexico) Tigres UANL
Denkey 6', 83'; Barlow 53'	Report

TQL Stadium, Cincinnati
Attendance: 9,257
Referee: Steven Madrigal (Costa Rica)
19 March 2026
21:00 (19:00 UTC−6)

Tigres UANL (Mexico)	5–1	(United States) FC Cincinnati
Aguirre 5', 49'; Herrera 10', 46'; Gorriarán 90+8'	Report	Denkey 65'

Estadio Universitario, San Nicolás de los Garza
Referee: Mario Escobar (Guatemala)

Tigres UANL won 5–4 on aggregate.

12 March 2026
22:00 (19:00 UTC−7)

Vancouver Whitecaps FC (Canada)	0–3	(United States) Seattle Sounders FC
	Report	Arriola 45', 58'; Rothrock 70'

BC Place, Vancouver
Attendance: 12,446
Referee: César Ramos (Mexico)
18 March 2026
23:00 (20:00 UTC−7)

Seattle Sounders FC (United States)	2–1	(Canada) Vancouver Whitecaps FC
Musovski 79'; Rothrock 83'	Report	Badwal 24'

One Spokane Stadium, Spokane (Note: Seattle Sounders FC played their home match in the round of 16 at One Spokane Stadium due to 2026 FIFA World Cup preparations at their regular home stadium, Lumen Field in Seattle.)
Attendance: 5,126
Referee: Oshane Nation (Jamaica)

Seattle Sounders FC won 5–1 on aggregate.

== Quarter-finals ==
Within each matchup, the team which had the better performance in the round of 16 hosted the second leg.

Pos	Team	Pld	W	D	L	GF	GA	GD	Pts	Host
1 (QF1)	(United States) LA Galaxy	2	2	0	0	6	0	+6	6	Second leg
2 (QF1)	(Mexico) Toluca	2	1	0	1	6	3	+3	3	First leg
1 (QF2)	(Mexico) Cruz Azul	2	1	1	0	4	3	+1	4	Second leg
2 (QF2)	(United States) Los Angeles FC	2	1	1	0	3	2	+1	4	First leg
1 (QF3)	(Mexico) América	2	1	1	0	2	1	+1	4	Second leg
2 (QF3)	(United States) Nashville SC	2	0	2	0	1	1	0	2	First leg
1 (QF4)	(United States) Seattle Sounders FC	2	2	0	0	5	1	+4	6	Second leg
2 (QF4)	(Mexico) Tigres UANL	2	1	0	1	5	4	+1	3	First leg

Source: CONCACAF
Rules for classification: 1) Points; 2) Goal difference; 3) Goals scored; 4) Away goals scored; 5) Wins; 6) Away wins; 7) Disciplinary points; 8) Drawing of lots (Regulations Article 12.10).

=== Summary ===
The first legs were played on 7 and 8 April, and the second legs were played on 14 and 15 April 2026.

Team 1	Agg.	Team 2	1st leg	2nd leg
Toluca (Mexico)	7–2	(United States) LA Galaxy	4–2	3–0
Los Angeles FC (United States)	4–1	(Mexico) Cruz Azul	3–0	1–1
Nashville SC (United States)	1–0	(Mexico) América	0–0	1–0
Tigres UANL (Mexico)	3–3 (a)	(United States) Seattle Sounders FC	2–0	1–3

=== Matches ===
8 April 2026
23:00 (21:00 UTC−6)

Toluca (Mexico)	4–2	(United States) LA Galaxy
Castro 12'; Paulinho 43', 73', 85'	Report	Gabriel Pec 66'; Reus 77'

Nemesio Diez Stadium, Toluca
Attendance: 27,035
Referee: Saíd Martínez (Honduras)
15 April 2026
21:00 (18:00 UTC−7)

LA Galaxy (United States)	0–3	(Mexico) Toluca
	Report	Gallardo 10'; Paulinho 58', 64'

Dignity Health Sports Park, Carson
Attendance: 15,473
Referee: Mario Escobar (Guatemala)

Toluca won 7–2 on aggregate.

7 April 2026
22:00 (19:00 UTC−7)

Los Angeles FC (United States)	3–0	(Mexico) Cruz Azul
Son Heung-min 30'; Martínez 39', 58'	Report

BMO Stadium, Los Angeles
Attendance: 17,521
Referee: Keylor Herrera (Costa Rica)
14 April 2026
21:00 (19:00 UTC−6)

Cruz Azul (Mexico)	1–1	(United States) Los Angeles FC
Fernández 18' (pen.)	Report	Bouanga 90+7' (pen.)

Estadio Cuauhtémoc, Puebla
Attendance: 24,965
Referee: Iván Barton (El Salvador)

Los Angeles FC won 4–1 on aggregate.

7 April 2026
20:00 (19:00 UTC−5)

Nashville SC (United States)	0–0	(Mexico) América
	Report

Geodis Park, Nashville
Attendance: 27,167
Referee: Oshane Nation (Jamaica)
14 April 2026
23:30 (21:30 UTC−6)

América (Mexico)	0–1	(United States) Nashville SC
	Report	Mukhtar 51'

Estadio Azteca, Mexico City
Attendance: 28,994
Referee: Walter López (Guatemala)

Nashville SC won 1–0 on aggregate.

8 April 2026
21:00 (19:00 UTC−6)

Tigres UANL (Mexico)	2–0	(United States) Seattle Sounders FC
Herrera 51'; Ragen 76' (o.g.)	Report

Estadio Universitario, San Nicolás de los Garza
Attendance: 37,641
Referee: Juan Gabriel Calderón (Costa Rica)
15 April 2026
23:30 (20:30 UTC−7)

Seattle Sounders FC (United States)	3–1	(Mexico) Tigres UANL
Rusnák 11', 82'; Musovski 48'	Report	Joaquim 31'

Lumen Field, Seattle
Attendance: 17,690
Referee: Ismael Cornejo (El Salvador)

3–3 on aggregate. Tigres UANL won on away goals.

== Semi-finals ==
The semi-finalists in each tie which had the better performance in previous rounds (excluding round one) hosted the second leg.

Pos	Team	Pld	W	D	L	GF	GA	GD	Pts	Host
1 (SF1)	(Mexico) Toluca	4	3	0	1	13	5	+8	9	Second leg
2 (SF1)	(United States) Los Angeles FC	4	2	2	0	7	3	+4	8	First leg
1 (SF2)	(Mexico) Tigres UANL	4	2	0	2	8	7	+1	6	Second leg
2 (SF2)	(United States) Nashville SC	4	1	3	0	2	1	+1	6	First leg

Source: CONCACAF
Rules for classification: 1) Points; 2) Goal difference; 3) Goals scored; 4) Away goals scored; 5) Wins; 6) Away wins; 7) Disciplinary points; 8) Drawing of lots (Regulations Article 12.10).

=== Summary ===
The first legs were played on 28 and 29 April, and the second legs were played on 5 and 6 May 2026.

Team 1	Agg.	Team 2	1st leg	2nd leg
Los Angeles FC (United States)	2–5	(Mexico) Toluca	2–1	0–4
Nashville SC (United States)	0–2	(Mexico) Tigres UANL	0–1	0–1

=== Matches ===
29 April 2026
22:30 (19:30 UTC−7)

Los Angeles FC (United States)	2–1	(Mexico) Toluca
Tillman 51'; Tafari 90+1'	Report	Angulo 73'

BMO Stadium, Los Angeles
Attendance: 20,593
Referee: Ismael Cornejo (El Salvador)
6 May 2026
21:30 (19:30 UTC−6)

Toluca (Mexico)	4–0	(United States) Los Angeles FC
Helinho 49' (pen.); López 58'; Paulinho 90+2', 90+4'	Report

Nemesio Diez Stadium, Toluca
Attendance: 27,273
Referee: Juan Gabriel Calderón (Costa Rica)

Toluca won 5–2 on aggregate.

28 April 2026
21:30 (20:30 UTC−5)

Nashville SC (United States)	0–1	(Mexico) Tigres UANL
	Report	Correa 33'

Geodis Park, Nashville
Attendance: 14,597
Referee: Keylor Herrera (Costa Rica)
5 May 2026
21:30 (19:30 UTC−6)

Tigres UANL (Mexico)	1–0	(United States) Nashville SC
Brunetta 68'	Report

Estadio Universitario, San Nicolás de los Garza
Attendance: 41,615
Referee: Mario Escobar (Guatemala)

Tigres UANL won 2–0 on aggregate.

== Final ==
The finalist with the better record during the competition's earlier stages (excluding round one), Toluca, hosted the match, at Nemesio Diez Stadium in Toluca.

Pos	Team	Pld	W	D	L	GF	GA	GD	Pts	Final
1	(Mexico) Toluca (H)	6	4	0	2	18	7	+11	12	Host
2	(Mexico) Tigres UANL	6	4	0	2	10	7	+3	12	

Source: CONCACAF
Rules for classification: 1) Points; 2) Goal difference; 3) Goals scored; 4) Away goals scored; 5) Wins; 6) Away wins; 7) Disciplinary points; 8) Drawing of lots.
(H) Hosts

=== Match ===
30 May 2026
20:00 (18:00 UTC−6)

Toluca (Mexico)	1–1 (a.e.t.)	(Mexico) Tigres UANL
J. Díaz 104'		Joaquim 114'
Penalties
Pérez (penalty scored); Simón (penalty scored); Pereira (penalty scored); J. Díaz (penalty scored); Romero (penalty missed); Córdova (penalty scored); Arce (penalty scored)	6–5	(penalty scored) Gignac; (penalty scored) Brunetta; (penalty missed) Gorriarán; (penalty scored) Correa; (penalty scored) Lainez; (penalty scored) Rômulo; (penalty missed) Purata

Nemesio Diez Stadium, Toluca
Referee: Ismail Elfath (United States)

== Statistics ==
=== Top goalscorers ===
Rank	Player	Team	Goals
1	(Portugal) Paulinho	(Mexico) Toluca	8
2	(Brazil) Gabriel Pec	(United States) LA Galaxy	6
3	(Gabon) Denis Bouanga	(United States) Los Angeles FC	5
4	(Uruguay) Rodrigo Aguirre	(Mexico) Tigres UANL	4
4	(Togo) Kévin Denkey	(United States) FC Cincinnati	4
4	(Venezuela) David Martínez	(United States) Los Angeles FC	4
7	(Mexico) Jesús Angulo	(Mexico) Toluca	3
7	(United States) Tom Barlow	(United States) FC Cincinnati	3
7	(Mexico) Jesús Gallardo	(Mexico) Toluca	3
7	(Mexico) Ozziel Herrera	(Mexico) Tigres UANL	3
7	(Brazil) Joaquim	(Mexico) Tigres UANL	3
7	(Argentina) Luka Romero	(Mexico) Cruz Azul	3
7	(United States) David Vazquez	(United States) San Diego FC	3

=== Best XI ===
CONCACAF selected the following players as the team of the tournament.

Pos.	Player	Team
GK	(Mexico) Luis García	(Mexican Football Federation) Toluca
DF	(Scotland) Ryan Porteous	(United States Soccer Federation) Los Angeles FC
DF	(Brazil) Joaquim	(Mexican Football Federation) Tigres UANL
DF	(Mexico) Jesús Gallardo	(Mexican Football Federation) Toluca
MF	(Argentina) Nicolás Castro	(Mexican Football Federation) Toluca
MF	(Canada) Mathieu Choinière	(United States Soccer Federation) Los Angeles FC
MF	(Venezuela) David Martínez	(United States Soccer Federation) Los Angeles FC
MF	(Argentina) Juan Brunetta	(Mexican Football Federation) Tigres UANL
MF	(Brazil) Helinho	(Mexican Football Federation) Toluca
FW	(Brazil) Gabriel Pec	(United States Soccer Federation) LA Galaxy
FW	(Portugal) Paulinho	(Mexican Football Federation) Toluca

=== Awards ===
Award	Player	Team	Ref.
Best Player Award	(Portugal) Paulinho	(Mexican Football Federation) Toluca	
Best Goalkeeper Award	(Mexico) Luis García	(Mexican Football Federation) Toluca	
Young Player Award	(Venezuela) David Martínez	(United States Soccer Federation) Los Angeles FC	
Top Scorer Award	(Portugal) Paulinho	(Mexican Football Federation) Toluca	
Fair Play Award	—N/a	(United States Soccer Federation) Nashville SC	

== See also ==
- 2025–26 CONCACAF W Champions Cup (women's edition of this tournament)
