= 2025 Campeones Cup =

Soccer match in Carson

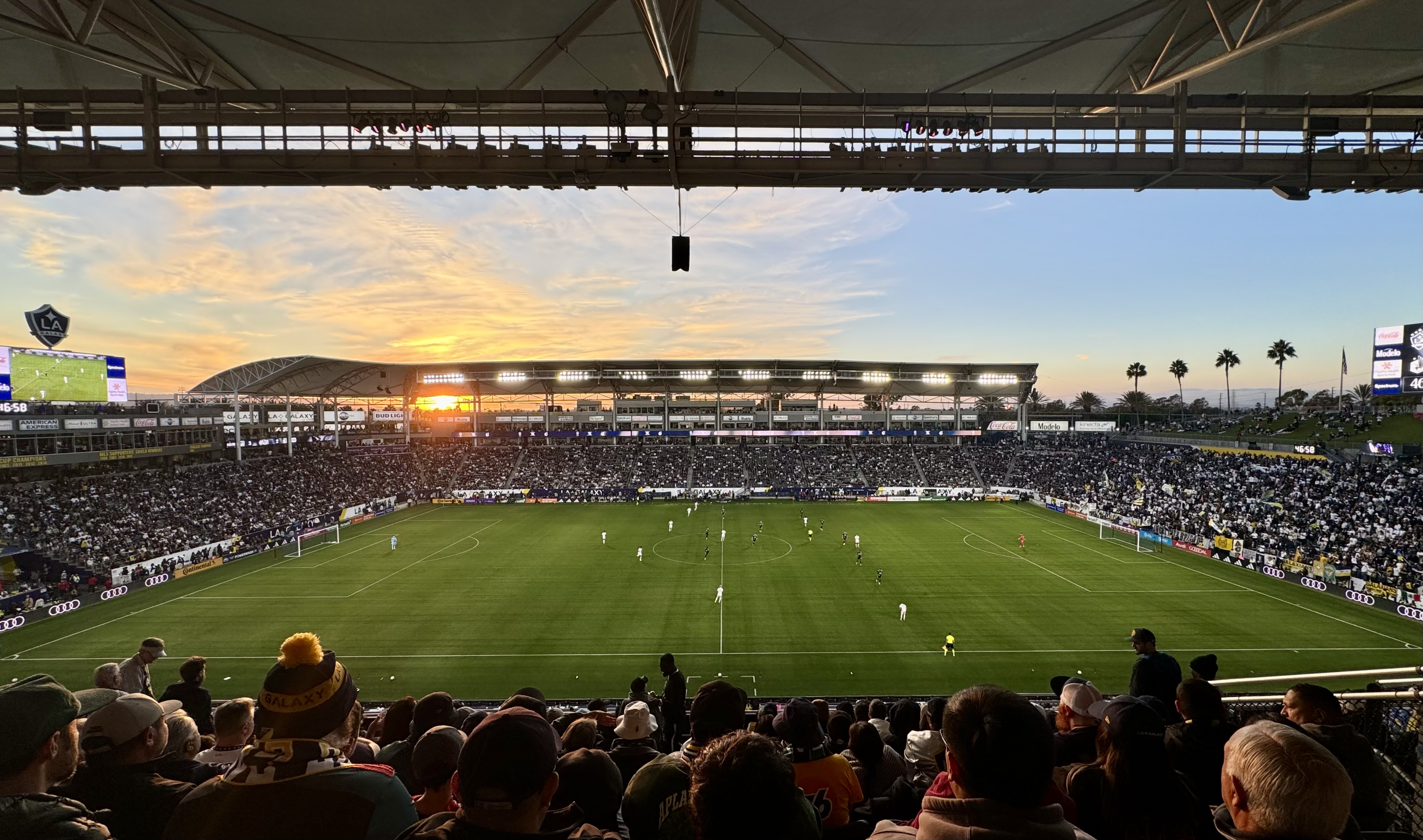
- Dignity Health Sports Park in Carson, California hosted the match
- Event: Campeones Cup
LA Galaxy	Toluca
(United States Soccer Federation)	(Mexican Football Federation)
2	3
- Date: October 1, 2025
- Venue: Dignity Health Sports Park, Carson, California, U.S.
- Man of the Match: Federico Pereira (Toluca)
- Referee: Iván Barton (El Salvador)
- Attendance: 16,104
- Weather: Clear night 68 °F (20 °C)

The 2025 Campeones Cup was the seventh edition of the Campeones Cup, an annual soccer match between the reigning MLS Cup champion, representing Major League Soccer (MLS) in the United States and Canada, and the Campeón de Campeones winner, representing Liga MX in Mexico. The match featured LA Galaxy, winners of the 2024 MLS Cup, and Toluca, winners of the 2025 Campeón de Campeones. Toluca won 3–2, with the winning goal scored in stoppage time.

== Background ==
The Campeones Cup, first held in 2018, is an annual match contested between the reigning MLS Cup champion from Major League Soccer (MLS), the top division of football in the United States and Canada, and the Campeón de Campeones winner from Liga MX, the top division of Mexican football. Toluca qualified for the 2025 Campeones Cup, the seventh edition of this competition, by winning the 2025 Campeón de Campeones super cup, defeating América 3–1, and LA Galaxy by winning the 2024 MLS Cup, defeating New York Red Bulls 2–1. Both clubs were making their first appearance in the competition.

Before this match, MLS and Liga MX clubs were level at three Campeones Cup wins each. In the 2024 edition, América defeated Columbus Crew 5–4 on penalties. A win for LA Galaxy would have given an MLS club its first Campeones Cup victory since the 2022 edition. The match was the first time Toluca and LA Galaxy had met in official competition.

LA Galaxy had finished last in the Western Conference in the 2025 MLS season, with five wins, seventeen losses, and nine draws, and missed the 2025 MLS Cup playoffs. In their most recent match, they had defeated Sporting Kansas City 5–1. Earlier that summer, they had finished third in the 2025 Leagues Cup, qualifying for the 2026 CONCACAF Champions Cup. Toluca, by contrast, were eleven matches into the Apertura 2025 season and top of the Liga MX standings, having been eliminated in the quarterfinals of the 2025 Leagues Cup. In their most recent league game, they had defeated Mazatlán 3–1.

== Venue ==
In July 2025, MLS and Liga MX announced that the match would be held at Dignity Health Sports Park in Carson, California, United States, which has a capacity of 26,000. Toluca had previously played the 2025 Campeón de Campeones at the same stadium. As the home ground of LA Galaxy, the venue gave the Galaxy home advantage. All previous editions of the Campeones Cup were also held in the United States.

== Match ==
=== First half ===
LA Galaxy had the first chance of the match in the 2nd minute, when Toluca lost possession and Harbor Miller shot wide of goal. Toluca responded by compacting the midfield to regain possession. In the 13th minute, Toluca had a clear chance when a shot from Nicolás Castro hit the post, but they were unable to convert. LA Galaxy responded with a counter-attack led by Joseph Paintsil, who reached Toluca's box and evaded goalkeeper Luis García but narrowly missed the target.

LA Galaxy took the lead in the 36th minute from a penalty, awarded after Toluca defender Jesús Gallardo fouled Gabriel Pec inside the penalty area. Pec had outrun Gallardo and was brought down with a tackle as he moved toward goal. Diego Fagúndez converted from the spot to make it 1–0. The goal improved LA Galaxy's momentum. In the 43rd minute, Miller dribbled past defenders to create another chance, but García saved it.

At the end of the first half, Toluca manager Antonio Mohamed was sent off after entering the pitch and approaching referee Iván Barton to complain about his officiating, in particular the penalty awarded to LA Galaxy, which Mohamed argued should have been given against his own player instead, and other fouls committed against his players. Mohamed watched the second half from the stands, with his son Shayr Mohamed left in charge. The two communicated by phone until they were told to stop, as it violated match regulations.

=== Second half ===
Toluca went on the offensive at the start of the second half, and Castro equalized with a long-range shot from outside the box to make it 1–1. Toluca continued to press for a winner. In the 59th minute, striker Paulinho shot from inside the box but was denied by a defender, and his appeal for a penalty was turned down. LA Galaxy responded in the 63rd minute with a shot from Paintsil that García saved. Paulinho had another opportunity in the 68th minute but was again denied by the goalkeeper, and in the 76th minute Alexis Vega shot wide from inside the box. In the 80th minute, Toluca won a free kick, which Vega took and played to Paulinho, who scored, but the goal was disallowed for offside after a video assistant referee (VAR) review.

LA Galaxy responded in the 83rd minute; following a poor clearance from Federico Pereira, Pec controlled the ball with his chest and shot softly toward goal to make it 2–1. Several Toluca players complained to the referee that Pec's goal should have been disallowed for offside, as LA Galaxy's Matheus Nascimento was in an offside position. The goal stood because Nascimento was not involved in the play. Shayr was then sent off for protesting the officiating.

With a few minutes remaining, Toluca continued to press forward. Following a poor clearance by the LA Galaxy defence from a Toluca free kick, Franco Romero shot from inside the box to make it 2–2 in the 88th minute. A draw would have taken the match straight to a penalty shootout, but Toluca scored again in stoppage time, in the 94th minute, to win 3–2. The goal came from a corner kick played to Helinho, who found Pereira in front of goal.

=== Details ===
October 1, 2025
7:30 p.m. EDT (UTC−4)

LA Galaxy (United States)	2–3	(Mexico) Toluca
Fagúndez 36' (pen.); Gabriel Pec 83'		Castro 53'; Romero 88'; Pereira 90+4'

Dignity Health Sports Park, Carson, California
Attendance: 16,104
Referee: Iván Barton (El Salvador)

LA Galaxy	Toluca

Substitutes: Manager: (United States) Greg Vanney	Substitutes: Manager: (Argentina) Antonio Mohamed

== Post-match ==
With the victory, Toluca won its first Campeones Cup, the fourth won by a Liga MX club, after Tigres UANL and América. Pereira was named the man of the match for his stoppage-time goal that sealed the victory. The win secured Toluca's third trophy in a calendar year.
