= 2021–22 Cruz Azul season =

95th season in existence of Cruz Azul

Cruz Azul
2021–22 season
- Sporting director: Jaime Ordiales
- Manager: Juan Reynoso
- Stadium: Estadio Azteca
- Liga MX: Apertura: 8th (Reclassification); Clausura: 8th (Quarter-finals)
- Campeón de Campeones: Winners
- Campeones Cup: Runners-up
- CONCACAF Champions League: Semi-finals
- Top goalscorer: League: Santiago Giménez (7); All: Santiago Giménez (7)
- Highest home attendance: 56,094 (v. UNAM, CONCACAF Champions League, 12 April 2022)
- Lowest home attendance: 7,720 (v. Monterrey, Liga MX Apertura, 18 August 2021)
- Average home league attendance: 19,825
- Biggest win: 4–0 v. Toluca (H); Liga MX Apertura, 14 August 2021
- Biggest defeat: 1–4 v. Monterrey (H); Liga MX Apertura, 21 November 2021
Home colours	Away colours	Third colours

The 2021–22 Cruz Azul Fútbol Club season was the 95th season in the football club's history and the 57th consecutive season in the top flight of Mexican football. In addition to the domestic league, the club participated in the Campeón de Campeones, the Campeones Cup, and the CONCACAF Champions League.

== Squad ==
As of 30 June 2022

No.	Player	Nationality	Date of birth (age)	Since	Signed from
Goalkeepers
1	José de Jesús Corona (captain)	(Mexico)	26 January 1981 (aged 41)	2009	(Mexico) Tecos
33	Sebastián Jurado	(Mexico)	28 September 1997 (aged 24)	2020	(Mexico) Veracruz
Defenders
2	Alejandro Mayorga	(Mexico)	29 May 1997 (aged 25)	2022	(Mexico) Guadalajara
3	Jaiber Jiménez	(Mexico)	7 January 1995 (aged 27)	2019	(Mexico) Cruz Azul Academy
4	Julio César Domínguez	(Mexico)	8 November 1987 (aged 34)	2006	(Mexico) Cruz Azul Academy
5	Luis Abram	(Peru)	27 February 1996 (aged 26)	2022	(Spain) Granada
12	José Joaquín Martínez	(Mexico)	22 February 1987 (aged 35)	2020	(Mexico) Morelia
16	Adrián Aldrete	(Mexico)	14 June 1988 (aged 34)	2016	(Mexico) Santos Laguna
23	Pablo Aguilar	(Paraguay)	2 May 1987 (aged 35)	2018	(Mexico) Tijuana
24	Juan Escobar	(Paraguay)	3 July 1995 (aged 26)	2019	(Paraguay) Cerro Porteño
Midfielders
6	Érik Lira	(Mexico)	8 May 2000 (aged 22)	2022	(Mexico) UNAM
7	Uriel Antuna	(Mexico)	21 August 1997 (aged 24)	2022	(Mexico) Guadalajara
8	Luis Ángel Mendoza	(Mexico)	3 February 1990 (aged 32)	2021	(Mexico) Mazatlán
10	Rómulo Otero	(Venezuela)	9 November 1992 (aged 29)	2021	(Brazil) Atlético Mineiro
11	Christian Tabó	(Uruguay)	23 November 1993 (aged 28)	2022	(Mexico) Puebla
15	Ignacio Rivero	(Uruguay)	10 April 1992 (aged 30)	2020	(Mexico) Tijuana
19	Carlos Rodríguez	(Mexico)	3 January 1997 (aged 25)	2022	(Mexico) Monterrey
22	Rafael Baca	(Mexico)	11 September 1989 (aged 32)	2014	(United States) San Jose Earthquakes
Forwards
9	Ángel Romero	(Paraguay)	4 July 1992 (aged 29)	2022	(Argentina) San Lorenzo
20	Iván Morales	(Chile)	29 July 1999 (aged 22)	2022	(Chile) Colo-Colo
29	Santiago Giménez	(Mexico)	18 April 2001 (aged 21)	2017	(Mexico) Cruz Azul Academy

== Transfers ==
=== In ===
Date	Pos.	No.	Player	From	Fee	Ref.
15 July 2021	MF	8	(Mexico) Luis Ángel Mendoza	(Mexico) Mazatlán	Undisclosed	
5 August 2021	MF	10	(Venezuela) Rómulo Otero	(Brazil) Atlético Mineiro	Undisclosed	
16 December 2021	MF	11	(Uruguay) Christian Tabó	(Mexico) Puebla	Undisclosed	
4 January 2022	MF	7	(Mexico) Uriel Antuna	(Mexico) Guadalajara	Undisclosed	
4 January 2022	MF	6	(Mexico) Érik Lira	(Mexico) UNAM	Undisclosed	
6 January 2022	MF	19	(Mexico) Carlos Rodríguez	(Mexico) Monterrey	Undisclosed	
1 February 2022	FW	9	(Paraguay) Ángel Romero	(Argentina) San Lorenzo	Undisclosed	
1 February 2022	FW	20	(Chile) Iván Morales	(Chile) Colo-Colo	Undisclosed	

=== Out ===
Date	Pos.	No.	Player	To	Fee	Ref.
1 June 2021	MF	14	(Mexico) Misael Domínguez	(Mexico) Tijuana	Undisclosed	
2 June 2021	MF	11	(Mexico) Elías Hernández	(Mexico) León	Undisclosed	
5 July 2021	FW	–	(Argentina) Milton Caraglio	(Argentina) Rosario Central	Undisclosed	
15 December 2021	MF	19	(Peru) Yoshimar Yotún	(Peru) Sporting Cristal	Free transfer	
31 December 2021	DF	5	(Mexico) Alexis Peña	(Mexico) Guadalajara	End of loan	
3 January 2022	FW	32	(Argentina) Walter Montoya	(Argentina) Rosario Central	Undisclosed	
4 January 2022	MF	25	(Mexico) Roberto Alvarado	(Mexico) Guadalajara	Undisclosed	
6 January 2022	MF	7	(Mexico) Luis Romo	(Mexico) Monterrey	Undisclosed	
6 January 2022	DF	24	(Mexico) Josué Reyes	(Mexico) Cimarrones de Sonora	Undisclosed	
7 January 2022	MF	31	(Mexico) Orbelín Pineda	(Spain) Celta de Vigo	Undisclosed	
11 January 2022	FW	21	(Uruguay) Jonathan Rodríguez	(Saudi Arabia) Al-Nassr	$6,000,000	
28 January 2022	MF	28	(Argentina) Guillermo Fernández	(Argentina) Boca Juniors	Undisclosed	
28 January 2022	FW	18	(Argentina) Lucas Passerini	(Chile) Unión La Calera	Contract terminated	
31 March 2022	FW	17	(Ecuador) Bryan Angulo	(Brazil) Santos	Contract terminated	

=== Loans in ===
Date	Pos.	No.	Player	From	Date until	Ref.
4 January 2022	DF	2	(Mexico) Alejandro Mayorga	(Mexico) Guadalajara	End of season	
25 January 2022	DF	5	(Peru) Luis Abram	(Spain) Granada	End of season	

=== Loans out ===
Date	Pos.	No.	Player	To	Date until	Ref.
3 January 2022	GK	30	(Mexico) Andrés Gudiño	(Mexico) Tepatitlán	End of season	
19 January 2022	MF	20	(Mexico) Alexis Gutiérrez	(Mexico) Tapatío	End of season	

== Pre-season and friendlies ==
7 July 2021 Friendly	Pachuca	1–2	Cruz Azul	Fresno, United States
19:30 PST	Ibañez 57'	Report	Giménez 23'; Jiménez 85'	Stadium: Chukchansi Park

10 July 2021 Friendly	Austin Bold FC	0–1	Cruz Azul	Austin, United States
20:00 CST		Report	Montoya 40'	Stadium: Bold Stadium

7 October 2021 Friendly	San Jose Earthquakes	2–0	Cruz Azul	San Jose, United States
19:30 PST	Marie 57'; Espinoza 70'	Report		Stadium: PayPal Park; Attendance: 12,029

20 December 2021 Friendly	Venados	1–2	Cruz Azul	Mérida, Mexico
20:00 CST	Amador 11'	Report	Huescas 74'; Rodríguez 89' (pen.)	Stadium: Estadio Carlos Iturralde

== Competitions ==
=== Overall record ===
Competition	First match	Last match	Starting round	Final position	Record							
Competition	First match	Last match	Starting round	Final position	Pld	W	D	L	GF	GA	GD	Win %
Liga MX Apertura	26 July 2021	21 November 2021	Matchday 1	Reclassification	18	5	8	5	22	21	+1	27.78
Liga MX Clausura	8 January 2022	15 May 2022	Matchday 1	Quarter-finals	20	8	5	7	22	19	+3	40.00
Campeón de Campeones	18 July 2021		Final	Winners	1	1	0	0	2	1	+1	100.00
Campeones Cup	29 September 2021		Final	Runners-up	1	0	0	1	0	2	−2	0.00
CONCACAF Champions League	16 February 2022	12 April 2022	Round of 16	Semi-finals	6	3	2	1	7	4	+3	50.00
Total					46	17	15	14	53	47	+6	36.96

Last updated: 15 May 2022
Source: Soccerway

=== Liga MX Apertura ===
==== League table ====
Pos	Team	Pld	W	D	L	GF	GA	GD	Pts	Qualification
6	Toluca	17	6	6	5	22	22	0	24	Qualification for the reclassification (Note: Teams ranked 5th to 12th in the table qualified for reclassification.)
7	Puebla	17	6	6	5	16	16	0	24	Qualification for the reclassification
8	Cruz Azul	17	5	8	4	21	17	+4	23	Qualification for the reclassification
9	Monterrey	17	5	7	5	19	16	+3	22	Qualification for the reclassification
10	Guadalajara	17	5	7	5	13	13	0	22	Qualification for the reclassification

Source: Liga MX
Rules for classification: 1) Points; 2) Goal difference; 3) Number of goals scored; 4) Head-to-head results between tied teams; 5) Number of goals scored away; 6) Highest relegation coefficient; 7) Fair Play points

==== Results summary ====
Overall								Home						Away					
Pld	W	D	L	GF	GA	GD	Pts	W	D	L	GF	GA	GD	W	D	L	GF	GA	GD
18	5	8	5	22	21	+1	23	3	3	3	12	11	+1	2	5	2	10	10	0

Last updated: 21 November 2021.
Source: Soccerway

==== Results by round ====
Round	1	2	3	4	5	6	7	8	9	10	11	12	13	14	15	16	17	18
Ground	H	A	A	H	H	A	H	A	H	A	A	H	A	A	H	H	A	H
Result	L	D	W	W	D	D	D	L	W	D	W	D	D	D	W	L	L	L
Position	16	13	11	5	5	6	7	8	8	7	8	6	7	6	6	5	8	RE
Points	0	1	4	7	8	9	10	10	13	14	17	18	19	20	23	23	23	–

Source: Liga MX
A = Away; H = Home; W = Win; D = Draw; L = Loss; P = Postponed; RE = Reclassification

==== Matches ====
The league fixtures were announced on 30 June 2021.

Win Draw Loss Fixtures

===== Regular phase =====
26 July 2021 1	Cruz Azul	0–2	Mazatlán	Mexico City
20:00 CST	Giménez (yellow card) 36'; Fernández (penalty missed) 70'	Report	Díaz 45'; Freitas (yellow card) 62'; Colula 66'; Rubio (yellow card) 71'	Stadium: Estadio Azteca; Attendance: 9,598; Referee: Diego Montaño Robles

1 August 2021 2	Santos Laguna	1–1	Cruz Azul	Torreón
18:00 CST	Gorriarán (penalty missed) 6'; Prieto (yellow card) 56'; Valdés 82' (pen.); Jeraldino (yellow card) 85'	Report	Escobar (yellow card) 7'; Passerini (yellow card) 24'; Angulo (yellow card) 35'; Gudiño (yellow card) 61'; Giménez 64', (yellow card) 90+4'; Rivero (yellow card) 81'	Stadium: Estadio Corona; Attendance: 12,200; Referee: Jorge Isaac Rojas Castillo

6 August 2021 3	Necaxa	1–2	Cruz Azul	Aguascalientes
21:05 CST	Zendejas 28'	Report	Formiliano 20' (o.g.); Aguilar (yellow card) 43'; Giménez 71'; Gudiño (yellow card) 82'; Martínez (yellow card) 87'	Stadium: Estadio Victoria; Attendance: 13,187; Referee: Adonai Escobedo González

14 August 2021 4	Cruz Azul	4–0	Toluca	Mexico City
21:06 CST	Angulo 4', 34'; Giménez 5'; Martínez (yellow card) 37'; Pineda 71'; Alvarado (yellow card) 76'	Report	Ortega (yellow card) 36' (yellow-red card) 39'; Baeza (yellow card) 76'; Torres Nilo (yellow card) 88'	Stadium: Estadio Azteca; Attendance: 8,588

18 August 2021 5	Cruz Azul	1–1	Monterrey	Mexico City
19:00 CST	Peña (yellow card) 49'; J. Rodríguez 67' (pen.); Rivero (red card) 86'; Fernández (yellow card) 90+4'	Report	C. Rodríguez (yellow card) 3'; Andrada (yellow card) 45'; Alvarado 90+1'	Stadium: Estadio Azteca; Attendance: 7,720; Referee: Jorge Antonio Pérez Durán

21 August 2021 6	Atlético San Luis	0–0	Cruz Azul	San Luis Potosí
21:00 CST	Waller (yellow card) 38'; Güemez (yellow card) 49'; Muñoz (yellow card) 90+7'; Bilbao (yellow card) 90+12'	Report	Alvarado (yellow card) 5'; Yotún (yellow card) 45+4'	Stadium: Estadio Alfonso Lastras; Attendance: 3,909; Referee: Oscar Mejía García

29 August 2021 7	Cruz Azul	1–1	Pachuca	Mexico City
20:00 CST	Rodríguez (yellow card) 45+6'; Giménez 59'	Report	Cabral (yellow card) 19'; Yotún 23' (o.g.); Hurtado (yellow card) 38'; Moreno (yellow card) 58'; Ibáñez (yellow card) 79'	Stadium: Estadio Azteca; Attendance: 14,626; Referee: Alejandro Funk Villafañe

10 September 2021 8	Juárez	2–1	Cruz Azul	Ciudad Juárez
20:00 MST	Acosta (yellow card) 16'; García 19'; Velázquez 35'; González (yellow card) 55'; García (yellow card) 62'; Esquivel (yellow card) 90'	Report	Passerini 4'; Escobar (yellow card) 26'; Martínez (yellow card) 45+3'; Fernández (yellow card) 60'; Peña (yellow card) 63'	Stadium: Estadio Olímpico Benito Juárez; Attendance: 11,623; Referee: Marco Antonio Ortiz Nava

19 September 2021 9	Cruz Azul	2–0	Querétaro	Mexico City
19:00 CST	Angulo 42'; Martínez (yellow card) 88'; Passerini 90+2' (pen.)	Report		Stadium: Estadio Azteca; Attendance: 14,882; Referee: Edgar Allan Morales Olvera

24 September 2021 10	Puebla	1–1	Cruz Azul	Puebla
20:00 CST	Parra 13'	Report	Angulo 38'; Yotún (yellow card) 40' (yellow-red card) 55'	Stadium: Estadio Cuauhtémoc; Attendance: 14,782; Referee: Oscar Mejía García

3 October 2021 12	Tijuana	0–1	Cruz Azul	Tijuana
19:06 PST	Guzmán (yellow card) 9'; Rak (yellow card) 47'; Orozco (yellow card) 90+6'	Report	Romo 17', (yellow card) 63'; Fernández (yellow card) 33'; Rivero (yellow card) 90+1'; Montoya (yellow card) 90+6'	Stadium: Estadio Caliente; Attendance: 10,333; Referee: Luis Enrique Santander Aguirre

16 October 2021 13	Cruz Azul	1–1	UANL	Mexico City
21:00 CST	Ayala 14' (o.g.); Rivero (yellow card) 16'; Fernández (yellow card) 39'	Report	Aquino (yellow card) 13'; Gignac 17'	Stadium: Estadio Azteca; Attendance: 20,894; Referee: Jorge Antonio Pérez Durán

19 October 2021 14	Atlas	0–0	Cruz Azul	Guadalajara
21:05 CST	Santamaría (yellow card) 17'; Torres (yellow card) 26'; Rocha (yellow card) 90'	Report	Yotún (yellow card) 29'; Angulo (yellow card) 53'; Escobar (yellow card) 87'; Aguilar (yellow card) 90+4'	Stadium: Estadio Jalisco; Attendance: 9,604; Referee: Jorge Isaac Rojas Castillo

23 October 2021 15	Guadalajara	1–1	Cruz Azul	Zapopan
21:00 CST	Brizuela (yellow card) 29'; Huerta (yellow card) 78'; Cisneros (yellow card) 89'; Sepúlveda 90+4'	Report	Rodríguez 45' (pen.), (yellow card) 75'; Alvarado (yellow card) 50'; Yotún (yellow card) 59'; Giménez (yellow card) 88'; Aguilar (yellow card) 90+7'	Stadium: Estadio Akron; Attendance: 20,492; Referee: Marco Antonio Ortiz Nava

31 October 2021 16	Cruz Azul	2–1	América	Mexico City
17:05 CST	Baca (yellow card) 15'; Alvarado 45+1'; Rodríguez 90+7' (pen.); Rivero (yellow card) 90+8'	Report	Aguilera (yellow card) 37' (yellow-red card) 90+5'; Viñas 52'; Benedetti (yellow card) 70'	Stadium: Estadio Azteca; Attendance: 31,257; Referee: Luis Enrique Santander Aguirre

3 November 2021 11	Cruz Azul	0–1	León	Mexico City
21:00 CST	Romo (yellow card) 53'; Escobar (yellow card) 68'; Aguilar (yellow card) 78'	Report	Rivero 31' (o.g.); Barreiro (yellow card) 58'; Cota (yellow card) 88'; Mena (yellow card) 90+2'; Mosquera (yellow card) 90+10'	Stadium: Estadio Azteca; Attendance: 17,928; Referee: Fernando Guerrero Ramírez

7 November 2021 17	UNAM	4–3	Cruz Azul	Mexico City
17:00 CST	Ortiz 6'; Rodríguez (yellow card) 34'; Álvarez 46'; Oliveira 62', 84'	Report	Alvarado 12', 21', 44'; Aguilar (yellow card) 52'	Stadium: Estadio Olímpico Universitario; Attendance: 23,573; Referee: Marco Antonio Ortiz Nava

===== Final phase =====
====== Reclassification ======
21 November 2021 Reclassification	Cruz Azul	1–4	Monterrey	Mexico City
19:15 CST	Yotún 32' (pen.), (yellow card) 49'; Corona (yellow card) 45+5'; Alvarado (yellow card) 53'	Report	Rogelio Funes Mori 10', 59' (pen.); Meza 27'; González (yellow card) 34'; Vegas (yellow card) 45+5'; Moreno (yellow card) 72'; Janssen 85'	Stadium: Estadio Azteca; Attendance: 0 (Note: One match attendance ban due to prohibited chants in the regular phase match between Cruz Azul and León.); Referee: Fernando Guerrero Ramírez

=== Liga MX Clausura ===
==== League table ====
Pos	Team	Pld	W	D	L	GF	GA	GD	Pts	Qualification
6	Guadalajara	17	7	5	5	25	21	+4	26	Qualification for the reclassification (Note: Teams ranked 5th to 12th in the table qualified for Reclassification.)
7	Monterrey	17	7	5	5	21	17	+4	26	Qualification for the reclassification
8	Cruz Azul	17	7	4	6	20	17	+3	25	Qualification for the reclassification
9	Necaxa	17	7	2	8	21	21	0	23	Qualification for the reclassification
10	Atlético San Luis	17	7	2	8	21	22	−1	23	Qualification for the reclassification

Source: Liga MX
Rules for classification: 1) Points; 2) Goal difference; 3) Number of goals scored; 4) Head-to-head results between tied teams; 5) Number of goals scored away; 6) Highest relegation coefficient; 7) Fair Play points

==== Results summary ====
Overall								Home						Away					
Pld	W	D	L	GF	GA	GD	Pts	W	D	L	GF	GA	GD	W	D	L	GF	GA	GD
20	8	5	7	22	19	+3	29	4	1	6	10	12	−2	4	4	1	12	7	+5

Last updated: 15 May 2022.
Source: Soccerway

==== Results by round ====
Round	1	2	3	4	5	6	7	8	9	10	11	12	13	14	15	16	17	18	19	20
Ground	H	H	A	A	H	A	H	A	H	H	A	H	A	H	A	H	A	H	H	A
Result	W	W	D	W	L	W	L	D	L	W	L	W	D	L	W	L	D	D	L	W
Position	4	3	2	2	4	3	4	4	6	5	6	4	5	6	4	6	8	RE	QF	QF
Points	3	6	7	10	10	13	13	14	14	17	17	20	21	21	24	24	25	–	–	–

Source: Liga MX
A = Away; H = Home; W = Win; D = Draw; L = Loss; P = Postponed; QF = Quarter-finals; RE = Reclassification

==== Matches ====
The league fixtures were announced on 12 December 2021.

Win Draw Loss Fixtures

===== Regular phase =====
8 January 2022 1	Cruz Azul	2–0	Tijuana	Mexico City
21:00 CST	Antuna (yellow card) 30'; Rodríguez 43'; Escobar (yellow card) 53'; Baca 66'	Report	Rak (yellow card) 61'	Stadium: Estadio Azteca; Attendance: 16,271; Referee: Daniel Quintero Huitrón

15 January 2022 2	Cruz Azul	1–0	Juárez	Mexico City
21:00 CST	Rodríguez 5'; Corona (yellow card) 22'; Escobar (yellow card) 32'; Lira (yellow card) 51'	Report	Esquivel (yellow card) 28'; Olivera (yellow card) 76'	Stadium: Estadio Azteca; Attendance: 13,801; Referee: Guillermo Pacheco Larios

22 January 2022 3	Monterrey	2–2	Cruz Azul	Guadalupe
21:06 CST	Meza (yellow card) 45+3'; Moreno (yellow card) 50'; Medina (red card) 51'; Funes Mori (yellow card) 67', (goal) 90+2'; Janssen (yellow card) 85'; Montes 90+7'	Report	Antuna 31'; Angulo 54' (pen.); Escobar (yellow card) 70''; Giménez (yellow card) 82' (yellow-red card) 88'	Stadium: Estadio BBVA; Attendance: 16,508; Referee: César Arturo Ramos Palazuelos

7 February 2022 4	León	0–1	Cruz Azul	León
21:05 CST	Martínez (yellow card) 14'; Rodríguez (yellow card) 45+3'; Dávila (yellow card) 65'	Report	Antuna 30'; Escobar (yellow card) 41'; Domínguez (yellow card) 72'	Stadium: Estadio León; Attendance: 14,097; Referee: Víctor Alfonso Cáceres Hernández

12 February 2022 5	Cruz Azul	1–2	Necaxa	Mexico City
19:00 CST	Escobar 34' (pen.); J. Domínguez (yellow card) 73'	Report	I. Domínguez (yellow card) 31'; Formiliano (yellow card) 48'; Giménez 84'; Aguirre 90+5', (yellow card) 90+6'; Araos (yellow card) 90+7'	Stadium: Estadio Azteca; Attendance: 26,967; Referee: Erick Yair Miranda Galindo

20 February 2022 6	Toluca	1–4	Cruz Azul	Toluca
18:05 CST	Rodríguez (yellow card) 5'; Sanvezzo 20'; Baeza (yellow card) 40'; García (yellow card) 54'	Report	Escobar 7', (yellow card) 57'; Lira (yellow card) 13'; Rodríguez (yellow card) 23', (goal) 64'; Mayorga (yellow card) 75'; Giménez 79' (pen.), 82'	Stadium: Estadio Nemesio Díez; Attendance: 22,438; Referee: Jorge Antonio Pérez Durán

27 February 2022 7	Cruz Azul	1–2	Santos Laguna	Mexico City
19:00 CST	Antuna (penalty missed) 21'; Rivero 64', (yellow card) 85'; Romero (yellow card) 82'	Report	Preciado 5'; Gorriarán (yellow card) 45+7'; Govea (yellow card) 61'; Dória (yellow card) 69'; Medina 90+4'	Stadium: Estadio Azteca; Attendance: 33,924; Referee: César Arturo Ramos Palazuelos

2 March 2022 8	UANL	2–2	Cruz Azul	San Nicólas
19:00 CST	Reyes (yellow card) 4'; Gignac 11', (yellow card) 88'; Vigón 30'; Quiñones (yellow card) 49'; Rodríguez (yellow card) 63'	Report	Abram 45+4'; Antuna (yellow card) 59'; Escobar (yellow card) 78'; Rivero 90+2'	Stadium: Estadio Universitario; Attendance: 36,978; Referee: Víctor Alfonso Cáceres Hernández

5 March 2022 9	Cruz Azul	1–3	Puebla	Mexico City
21:00 CST	Escobar 9'; Aguilar (yellow card) 81'		Aristeguieta 7', 43', 78'; Maia (yellow card) 69'	Stadium: Estadio Azteca; Attendance: 29,336; Referee: Jorge Antonio Pérez Durán

12 March 2022 10	Cruz Azul	2–1	UNAM	Mexico City
19:00 CST	Abram 29'; Escobar 70'; Aguilar (yellow card) 84'; Romero (yellow card) 90+2'; Rivero (yellow card) 90+2'	Report	Álvarez 30', (yellow card) 90+1'; Mozo (yellow card) 48'	Stadium: Estadio Azteca; Attendance: 12,686; Referee: Fernando Hernández Gómez

19 March 2022 11	Pachuca	1–0	Cruz Azul	Pachuca
21:00 CST	Sánchez 18', (yellow card) 58'; Álvarez (yellow card) 90+2'	Report	Rodríguez (yellow card) 76'; Escobar (yellow card) 80' (yellow-red card) 86'	Stadium: Estadio Hidalgo; Attendance: 11,367; Referee: Brian Omar Gonzalez Veles

2 April 2022 12	Cruz Azul	1–0	Atlas	Mexico City
17:00 CST	Giménez 37'; Rivero (yellow card) 90+2'; Jurado (yellow card) 90+8'	Report	Aguirre (yellow card) 31'; Zaldívar (yellow card) 34'; Trejo (yellow card) 47'	Stadium: Estadio Azteca; Attendance: 21,644; Referee: Luis Enrique Santander Aguirre

8 April 2022 13	Mazatlán	1–1	Cruz Azul	Mazatlán
20:00 MST	Intriago (yellow card) 26'; Meraz 39', (yellow card) 76'; Fabián (yellow card) 83'	Report	Baca (yellow card) 15'; Otero (yellow card) 42'; Romero 46'; Morales (yellow card) 51'; Martínez (yellow card) 62'; Tabó (yellow card) 83'	Stadium: Estadio El Encanto; Attendance: 15,206; Referee: Erick Yair Miranda Galindo

16 April 2022 14	Cruz Azul	0–1	Guadalajara	Mexico City
21:00 CST	Mayorga (yellow card) 54'; Escobar (yellow card) 66'; Rivero (yellow card) 73'	Report	Calderón 58'; Vega (red card) 71'; Alvarado (yellow card) 90+5'	Stadium: Estadio Azteca; Attendance: 21,280; Referee: Jorge Antonio Pèrez Durán

21 April 2022 15	Querétaro	0–1	Cruz Azul	Querétaro
21:00 CST		Report	Aguilar 74'	Stadium: Estadio Corregidora; Attendance: 0 (Note: Match played behind closed doors due to a home attendance ban at Estadio Corregidora following the Querétaro–Atlas riot.); Referee: Fernando Guerrero Ramírez

24 April 2022 16	Cruz Azul	0–1	Atlético San Luis	Mexico City
17:00 CST	Aldrete (yellow card) 13'; Domínguez (yellow card) 46'; Giménez (yellow card) 51'	Report	Chávez (yellow card) 39', (goal) 45+2'; Sambueza (yellow card) 53'; Waller (yellow card) 66'; Güémez (yellow card) 77'	Stadium: Estadio Azteca; Attendance: 17,222; Referee: Jesús Rafael López Valle

30 April 2022 17	América	0–0	Cruz Azul	Mexico City
21:00 CST	Aquino (yellow card) 10'; Sánchez (yellow card) 33'; Fidalgo (yellow card) 40'; Cáceres (yellow card) 85'	Report	Escobar (yellow card) 33'; Morales (yellow card) 33'	Stadium: Estadio Azteca; Attendance: 52,630; Referee: Marco Antonio Ortiz Nava

===== Final phase =====
====== Reclassification ======
7 May 2022 Reclassification	Cruz Azul	1–1 (3–1 p)	Necaxa	Mexico City
17:45 CST	Escobar 56'	Report	Aguirre 88'	Stadium: Estadio Azteca; Attendance: 29,073; Referee: Fernando Guerrero Ramírez
	Penalties
	(penalty scored) Romero; (penalty scored) Aldrete; (penalty scored) Abram		(penalty missed) Formiliano; (penalty scored) Araos; (penalty missed) Oliveros; (penalty missed) Palma

====== Quarter-finals ======
12 May 2022 First leg	Cruz Azul	0–1	UANL	Mexico City
19:00 CST	Morales (yellow card) 6'; Romero (yellow card) 47'; Tabó (yellow card) 64'; Escobar (yellow card) 82'; Antuna (yellow card) 90'	Report	Dueñas 44'; Quiñones (yellow card) 47'; López (red card) 60'; Ayala (yellow card) 90+6'	Stadium: Estadio Azteca; Attendance: 28,974; Referee: Fernando Hernández Gómez

15 May 2022 Second leg	UANL	0–1 (1 (s)–1 agg.)	Cruz Azul	San Nicolás
20:05 CST	Quiñones (yellow card) 28'; Aquino (red card) 45+6'; Carioca (yellow card) 45+7'; Gignac (yellow card) 59'	Report	Tabó 19', (yellow card) 52'; Morales (yellow card) 62'; Escobar (yellow card) 74'; Giménez (yellow card) 81'; Lira (yellow card) 86'; Antuna (yellow card) 90+5'	Stadium: Estadio Universitario; Attendance: 40,161; Referee: César Arturo Ramos Palazuelos

=== Campeón de Campeones ===
As the defending Liga MX Guardianes 2021 champions, Cruz Azul faced the reigning Liga MX Guardianes 2020 winners León in the Campeón de Campeones.

Win Draw Loss Fixtures

18 July 2021 Final	León	1–2	Cruz Azul	Carson, United States
16:30 PDT	Montes (yellow card) 42'; Barreiro (yellow card) 70'; Ormeño 82'; Ambríz (red card) 90+7'	Report	Yotún (yellow card) 18' (yellow-red card) 80'; Rodríguez 60', 67'; Fernández (yellow card) 62'; Rivero (yellow card) 70'	Stadium: Dignity Health Sports Park; Attendance: 27,674; Referee: Luis Enrique Santander

=== Campeones Cup ===
As the defending Campeón de Campeones champions, Cruz Azul faced the reigning MLS Cup winners Columbus Crew in the Campeones Cup.

Win Draw Loss Fixtures

29 September 2021 Final	Columbus Crew (United States)	2–0	(Mexico) Cruz Azul	Columbus, United States
20:00 EDT	Angulo 4' (o.g.); Díaz (yellow card) 66'; Mensah 74'	Report	Corona (yellow card) 32'; Aguilar (yellow card) 32'; Domínguez (yellow card) 32'; Baca (yellow card) 45+1'; Fernández (yellow card) 77'; Escobar (yellow card) 89'	Stadium: Lower.com Field; Attendance: 18,026; Referee: Oshane Nation (Jamaica)

=== CONCACAF Champions League ===
==== Round of 16 ====
16 February 2022 First leg	Forge FC (Canada)	0–1	(Mexico) Cruz Azul	Hamilton, Canada
20:00 EST	Bekker (yellow card) 86'	Report	Otero (yellow card) 29', (goal) 31'; Baca (yellow card) 89'	Stadium: Tim Hortons Field; Attendance: 4,688; Referee: Armando Villarreal (United States)

24 February 2022 Second leg	Cruz Azul (Mexico)	3–1 (4–1 agg.)	(Canada) Forge FC	Mexico City, Mexico
19:30 CST	Romero 5'; Baca 21'; Escobar 44'	Report	Choinière 26'; Poku (yellow card) 86'	Stadium: Estadio Azteca; Attendance: 28,724; Referee: Walter López (Guatemala)

==== Quarter-finals ====
9 March 2022 First leg	Cruz Azul (Mexico)	1–0	(Canada) CF Montréal	Mexico City, Mexico
21:00 CST	Antuna 20'; Escobar (yellow card) 52'; Baca (yellow card) 80'; Aldrete (yellow card) 87'	Report	Bassong (yellow card) 16'	Stadium: Estadio Azteca; Attendance: 12,928; Referee: Daneon Parchment (Jamaica)

16 March 2022 Second leg	CF Montréal (Canada)	1–1 (1–2 agg.)	(Mexico) Cruz Azul	Montreal, Canada
20:00 EST	Camacho 79'; Quioto (yellow card) 82'; Mihailovic (yellow card) 90'; Wanyama (yellow card) 90+6'	Report	Aguilar (yellow card) 39'; Antuna 44', (yellow card) 67'; Lira (yellow card) 85'; Jurado (yellow card) 90+2'	Stadium: Olympic Stadium; Attendance: 21,388; Referee: Keylor Herrera (Costa Rica)

==== Semi-finals ====
5 April 2022 First leg	UNAM (Mexico)	2–1	(Mexico) Cruz Azul	Mexico City, Mexico
21:00 CST	Dinenno 37', 45+2'; Oliveira (yellow card) 86'	Report	Baca (yellow card) 40'; Rivero (yellow card) 78'; Tabó 83'	Stadium: Estadio Olímpico Universitario; Attendance: 23,793; Referee: Armando Villarreal (United States)

12 April 2022 Second leg	Cruz Azul (Mexico)	0–0 (1–2 agg.)	(Mexico) UNAM	Mexico City, Mexico
21:00 CST	Antuna (yellow card) 45+2'; Lira (yellow card) 72'	Report	Dinenno (yellow card) 53'; Ortiz (red card) 63'	Stadium: Estadio Azteca; Attendance: 56,094; Referee: Mario Escobar (Guatemala)

== Statistics ==
As of match played 15 May 2022

=== Appearances ===
Players with no appearances are not included on the list.

No.	Pos	Nat	Player	Total		Liga MX Apertura		Liga MX Clausura		Campeón de Campeones		Campeones Cup		Champions League	
No.	Pos	Nat	Player	Apps	Goals	Apps	Goals	Apps	Goals	Apps	Goals	Apps	Goals	Apps	Goals
1	GK	(Mexico) MEX	José de Jesús Corona	21	0	9+0	0	9+0	0	1+0	0	1+0	0	1+0	0
2	DF	(Mexico) MEX	Alejandro Mayorga	17	0	0+0	0	8+6	0	0+0	0	0+0	0	1+2	0
3	DF	(Mexico) MEX	Jaiber Jiménez	2	0	2+0	0	0+0	0	0+0	0	0+0	0	0+0	0
4	DF	(Mexico) MEX	Julio César Domínguez	40	0	15+3	0	17+0	0	1+0	0	1+0	0	2+1	0
5	DF	(Peru) PER	Luis Abram	22	2	0+0	0	11+5	2	0+0	0	0+0	0	5+1	0
6	MF	(Mexico) MEX	Érik Lira	25	0	0+0	0	18+2	0	0+0	0	0+0	0	5+0	0
7	MF	(Mexico) MEX	Uriel Antuna	25	4	0+0	0	16+4	2	0+0	0	0+0	0	4+1	2
8	MF	(Mexico) MEX	Luis Ángel Mendoza	11	0	0+2	0	3+2	0	0+1	0	0+0	0	2+1	0
9	FW	(Paraguay) PAR	Ángel Romero	19	2	0+0	0	8+6	1	0+0	0	0+0	0	4+1	1
10	MF	(Venezuela) VEN	Romulo Otero	15	1	0+3	0	1+7	0	0+0	0	0+1	0	2+1	1
11	MF	(Uruguay) URU	Christian Tabó	16	2	0+0	0	8+4	1	0+0	0	0+0	0	1+3	1
12	DF	(Mexico) MEX	José Joaquín Martínez	27	0	6+6	0	4+5	0	0+1	0	0+0	0	3+2	0
15	MF	(Uruguay) URU	Ignacio Rivero	44	2	16+1	0	17+2	2	1+0	0	1+0	0	5+1	0
16	DF	(Mexico) MEX	Adrián Aldrete	27	0	4+3	0	14+1	0	0+0	0	0+0	0	5+0	0
19	MF	(Mexico) MEX	Carlos Rodríguez	16	3	0+0	0	12+0	3	0+0	0	0+0	0	3+1	0
20	FW	(Chile) CHI	Iván Morales	19	0	0+0	0	6+8	0	0+0	0	0+0	0	1+4	0
22	MF	(Mexico) MEX	Rafael Baca	44	2	13+5	0	16+3	1	1+0	0	1+0	0	4+1	1
23	DF	(Paraguay) PAR	Pablo Aguilar	37	1	13+2	0	14+3	1	1+0	0	1+0	0	3+0	0
24	DF	(Paraguay) PAR	Juan Escobar	41	6	14+3	0	13+4	5	1+0	0	1+0	0	4+1	1
29	FW	(Mexico) MEX	Santiago Giménez	43	7	10+7	4	3+15	3	0+1	0	0+1	0	5+1	0
33	GK	(Mexico) MEX	Sebastián Jurado	19	0	3+0	0	11+0	0	0+0	0	0+0	0	5+0	0
183	DF	(Mexico) MEX	Rafael Guerrero (Note: Player registered with the under-20 team.)	1	0	0+0	0	0+0	0	0+0	0	0+0	0	0+1	0
194	MF	(Mexico) MEX	Rodrigo Huescas	12	0	0+3	0	3+3	0	0+0	0	0+0	0	0+3	0
204	MF	(Mexico) MEX	Mauro Zaleta	1	0	0+1	0	0+0	0	0+0	0	0+0	0	0+0	0
206	MF	(Mexico) MEX	Cristian Jiménez	2	0	0+1	0	0+0	0	0+0	0	0+0	0	0+1	0
207	FW	(Mexico) MEX	Edgar Gutiérrez	1	0	0+1	0	0+0	0	0+0	0	0+0	0	0+0	0
Player(s) who have made an appearance but departed the club during the season:
2	DF	(Mexico) MEX	Josué Reyes	1	0	0+1	0	0+0	0	0+0	0	0+0	0	0+0	0
5	DF	(Mexico) MEX	Alexis Peña	11	0	7+3	0	0+0	0	0+1	0	0+0	0	0+0	0
7	MF	(Mexico) MEX	Luis Romo	10	1	8+1	1	0+0	0	0+0	0	1+0	0	0+0	0
17	FW	(Ecuador) ECU	Bryan Angulo	30	5	10+7	4	8+2	1	1+0	0	1+0	0	0+1	0
18	FW	(Argentina) ARG	Lucas Passerini	11	2	2+8	2	0+0	0	0+0	0	0+1	0	0+0	0
19	MF	(Peru) PER	Yoshimar Yotún	15	1	9+4	1	0+0	0	1+0	0	1+0	0	0+0	0
20	MF	(Mexico) MEX	Alexis Gutiérrez	3	0	1+2	0	0+0	0	0+0	0	0+0	0	0+0	0
21	FW	(Uruguay) URU	Jonathan Rodríguez	14	5	6+6	3	0+0	0	1+0	2	0+1	0	0+0	0
25	MF	(Mexico) MEX	Roberto Alvarado	16	4	12+3	4	0+0	0	0+0	0	0+1	0	0+0	0
28	MF	(Argentina) ARG	Guillermo Fernández	17	0	14+1	0	0+0	0	1+0	0	1+0	0	0+0	0
30	GK	(Mexico) MEX	Andrés Gudiño	6	0	6+0	0	0+0	0	0+0	0	0+0	0	0+0	0
31	MF	(Mexico) MEX	Orbelín Pineda	14	1	12+1	1	0+0	0	0+0	0	1+0	0	0+0	0
32	FW	(Argentina) ARG	Walter Montoya	16	0	6+9	0	0+0	0	1+0	0	0+0	0	0+0	0

=== Goals ===
Rank	Pos.	No.	Player	Liga MX Apertura	Liga MX Clausura	Campeón de Campeones	Campeones Cup	Champions League	Total
1	FW	29	(Mexico) Santiago Giménez	4	3	0	0	0	7
2	DF	24	(Paraguay) Juan Escobar	0	5	0	0	1	6
3	FW	17	(Ecuador) Bryan Angulo	4	1	0	0	0	5
3	FW	21	(Uruguay) Jonathan Rodríguez	3	0	2	0	0	5
5	MF	25	(Mexico) Roberto Alvarado	4	0	0	0	0	4
5	MF	7	(Mexico) Uriel Antuna	0	2	0	0	2	4
7	MF	19	(Mexico) Carlos Rodríguez	0	3	0	0	0	3
8	DF	5	(Peru) Luis Abram	0	2	0	0	0	2
8	MF	22	(Mexico) Rafael Baca	0	1	0	0	1	2
8	FW	18	(Argentina) Lucas Passerini	2	0	0	0	0	2
8	MF	15	(Uruguay) Ignacio Rivero	0	2	0	0	0	2
8	FW	9	(Paraguay) Ángel Romero	0	1	0	0	1	2
8	MF	11	(Uruguay) Christian Tabó	0	1	0	0	1	2
14	DF	23	(Paraguay) Pablo Aguilar	0	1	0	0	0	1
14	MF	10	(Venezuela) Rómulo Otero	0	0	0	0	1	1
14	MF	31	(Mexico) Orbelín Pineda	1	0	0	0	0	1
14	MF	7	(Mexico) Luis Romo	1	0	0	0	0	1
14	MF	19	(Peru) Yoshimar Yotún	1	0	0	0	0	1
Own goals				2	0	0	0	0	2
Total				22	22	2	0	7	53

=== Assists ===
Rank	Pos.	No.	Player	Liga MX Apertura	Liga MX Clausura	Campeón de Campeones	Campeones Cup	Champions League	Total
1	DF	24	(Paraguay) Juan Escobar	1	2	1	0	0	4
2	MF	7	(Mexico) Uriel Antuna	0	3	0	0	0	3
2	MF	19	(Mexico) Carlos Rodríguez	0	3	0	0	0	3
4	FW	29	(Mexico) Santiago Giménez	0	1	1	0	0	2
4	MF	8	(Mexico) Luis Ángel Mendoza	0	0	0	0	2	2
4	FW	20	(Chile) Iván Morales	0	1	0	0	1	2
4	MF	31	(Mexico) Orbelín Pineda	2	0	0	0	0	2
4	FW	9	(Paraguay) Ángel Romero	0	1	0	0	1	2
4	MF	7	(Mexico) Luis Romo	2	0	0	0	0	2
10	DF	23	(Paraguay) Pablo Aguilar	0	1	0	0	0	1
10	DF	16	(Mexico) Adrián Aldrete	0	1	0	0	0	1
10	MF	25	(Mexico) Roberto Alvarado	1	0	0	0	0	1
10	FW	17	(Ecuador) Bryan Angulo	0	1	0	0	0	1
10	MF	22	(Mexico) Rafael Baca	0	1	0	0	0	1
10	DF	4	(Mexico) Julio César Domínguez	0	1	0	0	0	1
10	DF	3	(Mexico) Jaiber Jiménez	1	0	0	0	0	1
10	DF	12	(Mexico) José Joaquín Martínez	1	0	0	0	0	1
10	MF	10	(Venezuela) Rómulo Otero	0	0	0	0	1	1
Total				8	16	2	0	5	31

=== Clean sheets ===
Rank	Pos.	No.	Player	Liga MX Apertura	Liga MX Clausura	Campeón de Campeones	Campeones Cup	Champions League	Total
1	GK	33	(Mexico) Sebastián Jurado	2	4	0	0	2	8
2	GK	1	(Mexico) José de Jesús Corona	2	2	0	0	1	5
3	GK	30	(Mexico) Andrés Gudiño	1	0	0	0	0	1
Total				5	6	0	0	3	14

=== Disciplinary record ===
No.	Pos.	Player	Liga MX Apertura			Liga MX Clausura			Campeón de Campeones			Campeones Cup			Champions League			Total		
No.	Pos.	Player	Yellow card	(yellow card) (yellow-red card)	Red card	Yellow card	(yellow card) (yellow-red card)	Red card	Yellow card	(yellow card) (yellow-red card)	Red card	Yellow card	(yellow card) (yellow-red card)	Red card	Yellow card	(yellow card) (yellow-red card)	Red card	Yellow card	(yellow card) (yellow-red card)	Red card
1	GK	(Mexico) José de Jesús Corona	1	0	0	1	0	0	0	0	0	1	0	0	0	0	0	3	0	0
2	DF	(Mexico) Alejandro Mayorga	0	0	0	2	0	0	0	0	0	0	0	0	0	0	0	2	0	0
4	DF	(Mexico) Julio César Domínguez	0	0	0	3	0	0	0	0	0	1	0	0	0	0	0	4	0	0
5	DF	(Mexico) Alexis Peña	2	0	0	0	0	0	0	0	0	0	0	0	0	0	0	2	0	0
6	MF	(Mexico) Érik Lira	0	0	0	3	0	0	0	0	0	0	0	0	2	0	0	5	0	0
7	MF	(Mexico) Uriel Antuna	0	0	0	3	0	0	0	0	0	0	0	0	2	0	0	5	0	0
7	MF	(Mexico) Luis Romo	2	0	0	1	0	0	0	0	0	0	0	0	0	0	0	3	0	0
9	FW	(Paraguay) Ángel Romero	0	0	0	3	0	0	0	0	0	0	0	0	0	0	0	3	0	0
10	MF	(Venezuela) Romulo Otero	0	0	0	1	0	0	0	0	0	0	0	0	1	0	0	2	0	0
11	MF	(Uruguay) Christian Tabó	0	0	0	3	0	0	0	0	0	0	0	0	0	0	0	3	0	0
12	DF	(Mexico) José Joaquín Martínez	4	0	0	1	0	0	0	0	0	0	0	0	0	0	0	5	0	0
15	MF	(Uruguay) Ignacio Rivero	4	0	1	4	0	0	1	0	0	0	0	0	1	0	0	10	0	1
16	DF	(Mexico) Adrián Aldrete	0	0	0	1	0	0	0	0	0	0	0	0	1	0	0	2	0	0
17	FW	(Ecuador) Bryan Angulo	2	0	0	0	0	0	0	0	0	0	0	0	0	0	0	2	0	0
18	FW	(Argentina) Lucas Passerini	1	0	0	0	0	0	0	0	0	0	0	0	0	0	0	1	0	0
19	MF	(Mexico) Carlos Rodríguez	0	0	0	2	0	0	0	0	0	0	0	0	0	0	0	2	0	0
19	MF	(Peru) Yoshimar Yotún	5	1	0	0	0	0	0	1	0	0	0	0	0	0	0	5	2	0
20	FW	(Chile) Iván Morales	0	0	0	3	0	0	0	0	0	0	0	0	0	0	0	3	0	0
21	FW	(Uruguay) Jonathan Rodríguez	2	0	0	0	0	0	0	0	0	0	0	0	0	0	0	2	0	0
22	MF	(Mexico) Rafael Baca	1	0	0	1	0	0	0	0	0	1	0	0	3	0	0	6	0	0
23	DF	(Paraguay) Pablo Aguilar	5	0	0	2	0	0	0	0	0	1	0	0	1	0	0	9	0	0
24	DF	(Paraguay) Juan Escobar	4	0	0	9	1	0	0	0	0	1	0	0	1	0	0	15	1	0
25	MF	(Mexico) Roberto Alvarado	4	0	0	0	0	0	0	0	0	0	0	0	0	0	0	4	0	0
28	MF	(Argentina) Guillermo Fernández	4	0	0	0	0	0	1	0	0	1	0	0	0	0	0	6	0	0
29	FW	(Mexico) Santiago Giménez	3	0	0	2	1	0	0	0	0	0	0	0	0	0	0	5	1	0
30	GK	(Mexico) Andrés Gudiño	2	0	0	0	0	0	0	0	0	0	0	0	0	0	0	2	0	0
32	FW	(Argentina) Walter Montoya	1	0	0	0	0	0	0	0	0	0	0	0	0	0	0	1	0	0
33	GK	(Mexico) Sebastián Jurado	0	0	0	1	0	0	0	0	0	0	0	0	1	0	0	2	0	0
Total			47	1	1	46	2	0	2	1	0	6	0	0	13	0	0	114	4	1
