= 2021 Campeones Cup =

Football match

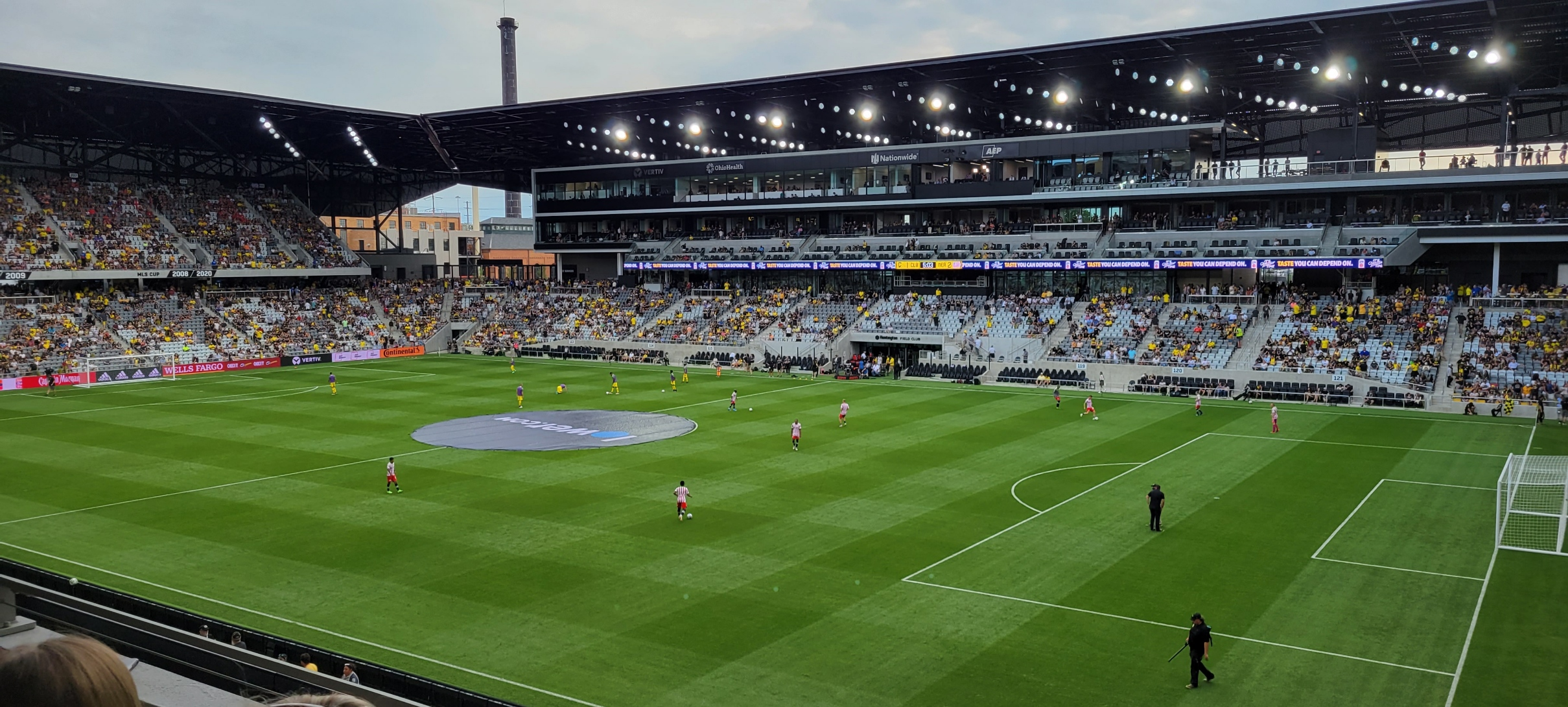
- Lower.com Field in Columbus, Ohio hosted the match
- Event: Campeones Cup
Columbus Crew	Cruz Azul
(United States)	(Mexico)
2	0
- Date: September 29, 2021
- Venue: Lower.com Field, Columbus, Ohio
- Man of the Match: Lucas Zelarayán (Columbus Crew)
- Referee: Oshane Nation (Jamaica)
- Attendance: 18,026

The 2021 Campeones Cup was the third edition of the Campeones Cup, an annual North American football match contested between the champions of the previous Major League Soccer season and the winner of the Campeón de Campeones from Liga MX.

The match featured Columbus Crew, winners of the 2020 MLS Cup, and Cruz Azul, winners of the 2021 Campeón de Campeones. The Columbus Crew hosted the match at their home stadium, Lower.com Field in Columbus, Ohio, United States. It was played on September 29, 2021.

== Match ==
=== Details ===
September 29, 2021
8:00 p.m. EDT (UTC−4)

Columbus Crew (United States)	2–0	(Mexico) Cruz Azul
Angulo 4' (o.g.); Mensah 74'	Report

Lower.com Field, Columbus, Ohio
Attendance: 18,026
Referee: Oshane Nation (Jamaica)

Columbus Crew	Cruz Azul

GK	24	(United States) Evan Bush
DF	31	(France) Steven Moreira	(substituted off) 58'
DF	4	(Ghana) Jonathan Mensah (c)
DF	3	(United States) Josh Williams
DF	30	(United States) Aboubacar Keita
DF	7	(Portugal) Pedro Santos
MF	6	(United States) Darlington Nagbe	(substituted off) 78'
MF	22	(Haiti) Derrick Etienne Jr.	(substituted off) 58'
MF	18	(Canada) Liam Fraser
MF	10	(Armenia) Lucas Zelarayán	(substituted off) 78'
FW	27	(Spain) Miguel Berry	(substituted off) 64'
Substitutions:
MF	17	(United States) Marlon Hairston	(substituted on) 78'
MF	20	(Romania) Alexandru Mățan
DF	14	(Costa Rica) Waylon Francis
GK	13	(United States) Eric Dick
DF	23	(United States) Grant Lillard
DF	26	(United States) Saad Abdul-Salaam
MF	16	(United States) Isaiah Parente
FW	99	(England) Bradley Wright-Phillips	(substituted on) 78'
MF	12	(Costa Rica) Luis Díaz	(substituted on) 64' (yellow card) 66'
DF	25	(Ghana) Harrison Afful	(substituted on) 58'
DF	19	(Argentina) Milton Valenzuela	(substituted on) 58'
Manager:
(United States) Caleb Porter

GK	1	(Mexico) Jesús Corona (c)	(yellow card) 32'
DF	23	(Paraguay) Pablo Aguilar	(substituted off) 46' (yellow card) 32'
DF	7	(Mexico) Luis Romo
DF	4	(Mexico) Julio César Domínguez	(yellow card) 32'
DF	24	(Paraguay) Juan Escobar	(yellow card) 89'
MF	22	(Mexico) Rafael Baca	(substituted off) 46' (yellow card) 45+1'
MF	19	(Peru) Yoshimar Yotún	(substituted off) 68'
MF	15	(Uruguay) Ignacio Rivero	(substituted off) 81'
MF	31	(Mexico) Orbelín Pineda
MF	28	(Argentina) Guillermo Fernández	(yellow card) 77'
FW	17	(Ecuador) Brayan Angulo	(substituted off) 76'
Substitutions:
DF	16	(Mexico) Adrián Aldrete
FW	29	(Mexico) Santiago Giménez	(substituted on) 46'
DF	2	(Mexico) Josué Reyes
MF	20	(Mexico) Alexis Gutiérrez
FW	21	(Uruguay) Jonathan Rodríguez	(substituted on) 46'
FW	25	(Mexico) Roberto Alvarado	(substituted on) 68'
GK	33	(Mexico) Sebastián Jurado
FW	18	(Argentina) Lucas Passerini	(substituted on) 76'
DF	12	(Mexico) José Joaquín Martínez
GK	30	(Mexico) Andrés Gudiño
FW	32	(Argentina) Walter Montoya
MF	10	(Venezuela) Rómulo Otero	(substituted on) 81'
Manager:
(Peru) Juan Reynoso

Assistant referees:
Ojay Duhaney (Jamaica)
Irrots Appleton (Antigua and Barbuda)
Fourth official:
Reon Radix (Grenada)

=== Statistics ===
Statistic	Columbus Crew	Cruz Azul
Goals scored	2	0
Total shots	5	16
Shots on target	2	5
Saves	5	1
Ball possession	25.5%	74.5%
Corner kicks	1	11
Fouls committed	13	17
Total Passes	197	566
Passing Accuracy	68%	86.8%
Offsides	0	0
Yellow cards	1	6
Red cards	0	0
