= 2020–21 Cruz Azul season =

Cruz Azul
2020–21 season
- President: Álvaro Dávila
- Manager: Robert Siboldi (until 11 December 2020); Luis Armando González (Interim; from 11 December 2020 to 7 January 2021); Juan Reynoso (from 7 January 2021)
- Stadium: Estadio Azteca
- Liga MX: Apertura: 4th (Semi-finals); Clausura: 1st (Winners)
- Champions League: Semi-finals
- Top goalscorer: League: Apertura: Jonathan Rodríguez (12 goals); Clausura: Jonathan Rodríguez (9 goals); All: Jonathan Rodríguez (23 goals)
- Biggest win: 8–0 vs Arcahaie
- Biggest defeat: 0–4 vs Pumas UNAM
| Home colours | Away colours | Third colours |
- All statistics correct as of 28 April 2021.

The 2020–21 Cruz Azul Fútbol Club season was the 94th season in the football club's history and the 56th consecutive season in the top flight of Mexican football. Cruz Azul competed in Liga MX and the CONCACAF Champions League.

== Kits ==
| Home | Away | Third | Home alt. | Away alt. |

== Players ==
=== Squad information ===
| No. | Pos. | Nat. | Name | Age | Signed in | Previous club |
|---|---|---|---|---|---|---|
| 1 | GK | (Mexico) | José de Jesús Corona (captain) | 40 | 2009 | (Mexico) UAG |
| 3 | DF | (Mexico) | Jaiber Jiménez | 26 | 2019 | Youth system |
| 4 | DF | (Mexico) | Julio César Domínguez (vice-captain) | 33 | 2006 | Youth system |
| 5 | DF | (Mexico) | Alexis Peña | 25 | 2020 | (Mexico) Guadalajara |
| 7 | MF | (Mexico) | Luis Romo | 25 | 2020 | (Mexico) Querétaro |
| 9 | MF | (Argentina) | Walter Montoya | 27 | 2018 | (Argentina) Racing Club |
| 11 | MF | (Mexico) | Elías Hernández | 33 | 2018 | (Mexico) León |
| 12 | DF | (Mexico) | José Joaquín Martínez | 34 | 2020 | (Mexico) Monarcas Morelia |
| 14 | MF | (Mexico) | Misael Domínguez | 21 | 2018 | (Mexico) Monterrey |
| 15 | MF | (Uruguay) | Ignacio Rivero | 29 | 2020 | (Mexico) Tijuana |
| 16 | DF | (Mexico) | Adrián Aldrete | 32 | 2016 | (Mexico) Santos Laguna |
| 17 | FW | (Ecuador) | Brayan Angulo | 25 | 2019 | (Mexico) Tijuana |
| 19 | MF | (Peru) | Yoshimar Yotún | 31 | 2019 | (United States) Orlando City |
| 20 | MF | (Mexico) | Alexis Gutiérrez | 21 | 2019 | (Mexico) Guadalajara |
| 21 | FW | (Uruguay) | Jonathan Rodríguez | 27 | 2019 (Winter) | (Mexico) Santos Laguna |
| 22 | MF | (Mexico) | Rafael Baca | 31 | 2014 (Winter) | (United States) San Jose Earthquakes |
| 23 | DF | (Paraguay) | Pablo Aguilar | 34 | 2018 | (Mexico) Tijuana |
| 24 | DF | (Paraguay) | Juan Escobar | 25 | 2019 | (Paraguay) Cerro Porteño |
| 25 | MF | (Mexico) | Roberto Alvarado | 22 | 2018 | (Mexico) Necaxa |
| 28 | MF | (Argentina) | Guillermo Fernández | 29 | 2019 | (Argentina) Boca Juniors |
| 29 | FW | (Mexico) | Santiago Giménez | 20 | 2017 | Youth system |
| 30 | GK | (Mexico) | Andrés Gudiño | 24 | 2019 | Youth system |
| 31 | MF | (Mexico) | Orbelín Pineda | 25 | 2019 (Winter) | (Mexico) Guadalajara |
| 33 | GK | (Mexico) | Sebastián Jurado | 23 | 2020 (Winter) | (Mexico) Veracruz |

|}

- Last updated: 29 April 2021
- Source: ligamx.net and cruzazulfc.com.mx

== Transfers ==
=== In ===
| Date | Pos. | Name | From | Type | Ref. |
|---|---|---|---|---|---|
| Winter 2021 | DF | (Mexico) Alexis Peña | (Mexico) Guadalajara | Loan | |
| Winter 2021 | MF | (Argentina) Guillermo Fernández | (Argentina) Boca Juniors | End of loan | |
| Winter 2021 | FW | (Argentina) Walter Montoya | (Argentina) Racing Club | End of loan | |
| Winter 2021 | FW | (Ecuador) Bryan Angulo | (Mexico) Tijuana | End of loan | |

== Pre-season and friendlies ==
Win Draw Loss Fixtures

=== Copa por México ===
==== Group stage ====
| Pos | Team | Pld | W | D | L | GF | GA | GD | Pts | Qualification |
|---|---|---|---|---|---|---|---|---|---|---|
| 1 | Cruz Azul | 3 | 3 | 0 | 0 | 9 | 2 | +7 | 9 | Advance to knockout stage |
| 2 | América | 3 | 1 | 1 | 1 | 3 | 4 | −1 | 4 | Advance to knockout stage |
| 3 | Pumas UNAM | 3 | 0 | 2 | 1 | 1 | 4 | −3 | 2 | |
| 4 | Toluca | 3 | 0 | 1 | 2 | 0 | 3 | −3 | 1 | |

Source: Soccerway

| 4 July 2020 1 | Pumas UNAM (Mexico) | 1–4 | (Mexico) Cruz Azul | Mexico City |
| 19:30 (UTC-5) | González 3' | | Josué Reyes 11', 40'; Hernández 64'; Rodriguez 90' | Stadium: Estadio Olímpico Universitario; Attendance: 0 |

| 8 July 2020 2 | Cruz Azul (Mexico) | 1–0 | (Mexico) Toluca | Mexico City |
| 19:00 (UTC-5) | Escobar 45' | | | Stadium: Estadio Olímpico Universitario; Attendance: 0 |

| 11 July 2020 3 | América (Mexico) | 1–4 | (Mexico) Cruz Azul | Mexico City |
| 19:30 (UTC-5) | Córdova 13' | | Viñas 39' (o.g.); Rodríguez 47'; Gutiérrez 52'; Pineda 56' | Stadium: Estadio Olímpico Universitario; Attendance: 0 |

==== Knockout stage ====
| 15 July 2020 Semi-finals | Cruz Azul (Mexico) | 1–1 (4–3 p) | (Mexico) Tigres UANL | Mexico City |
| 22:00 (UTC-5) | Lichnovsky 90+2' | | Quiñones 35' | Stadium: Estadio Olímpico Universitario; Attendance: 0 |
| | Penalties |
| | Caraglio (penalty missed); Gutiérrez (penalty scored); Aldrete (penalty missed); Pineda (penalty scored); Rodríguez (penalty scored); J. Domínguez (penalty scored) | | (penalty scored) Gignac; (penalty missed) Quiñones; (penalty scored) Dueñas; (penalty scored) Salcedo; (penalty missed) Rafael Carioca; (penalty missed) Pizarro |

| 19 July 2020 Final | Cruz Azul (Mexico) | 2–1 | (Mexico) Guadalajara | Mexico City |
| 21:00 (UTC-5) | Mier 53' (o.g.); Rodríguez 90+3' | | Vega 48' | Stadium: Estadio Olímpico Universitario; Attendance: 0 |

== Competitions ==
=== Overview ===
| Competition | First match | Last match | Starting round | Final position | Record | | | | | | | |
| Competition | First match | Last match | Starting round | Final position | Pld | W | D | L | GF | GA | GD | Win % |
|---|---|---|---|---|---|---|---|---|---|---|---|---|
| Torneo Apertura | 25 July 2020 | 6 December 2020 | Matchday 1 | Semi-finals (4th) | 21 | 11 | 2 | 8 | 30 | 22 | +8 | 52.38 |
| Torneo Clausura | 10 January 2021 | 30 May 2021 | Matchday 1 | Winners | 23 | 16 | 4 | 3 | 33 | 15 | +18 | 69.57 |
| CONCACAF Champions League | 6 April 2021 | 16 September 2021 | Round of 16 | Semi-finals | 6 | 3 | 1 | 2 | 13 | 6 | +7 | 50.00 |
| Total | | | | | 50 | 30 | 7 | 13 | 76 | 43 | +33 | 60.00 |

Last updated: 16 September 2021
Source: Mediotiempo.com

=== Liga MX ===
==== Torneo Apertura ====
===== League table =====
| Pos | Team | Pld | W | D | L | GF | GA | GD | Pts | Qualification |
|---|---|---|---|---|---|---|---|---|---|---|
| 2 | UNAM | 17 | 8 | 8 | 1 | 29 | 17 | +12 | 32 | Qualification for the quarter-finals (Note: The first four places in the table qualified for the Liguilla quarter-finals.) |
| 3 | América | 17 | 9 | 5 | 3 | 31 | 22 | +9 | 32 | Qualification for the quarter-finals |
| 4 | Cruz Azul | 17 | 9 | 2 | 6 | 23 | 16 | +7 | 29 | Qualification for the quarter-finals |
| 5 | Monterrey | 17 | 8 | 5 | 4 | 26 | 21 | +5 | 29 | Qualification for the Reclassification (Note: Teams ranked 5th to 12th in the table qualified for Reclassification) |
| 6 | UANL | 17 | 7 | 7 | 3 | 27 | 16 | +11 | 28 | Qualification for the Reclassification |

Source: Liga MX
Rules for classification: 1) Points; 2) Goal difference; 3) Number of goals scored; 4) Head-to-head results between tied teams; 5) Number of goals scored away; 6) Highest relegation coefficient; 7) Fair Play points

===== Results summary =====
| Overall | | | | | | | | Home | | | | | | Away | | | | | |
| Pld | W | D | L | GF | GA | GD | Pts | W | D | L | GF | GA | GD | W | D | L | GF | GA | GD |
|---|---|---|---|---|---|---|---|---|---|---|---|---|---|---|---|---|---|---|---|
| 17 | 9 | 2 | 6 | 23 | 16 | +7 | 29 | 5 | 1 | 2 | 12 | 6 | +6 | 4 | 1 | 4 | 11 | 10 | +1 |

Last updated: 7 November 2020.
Source: Soccerway

===== Results round by round =====
| Round | 1 | 2 | 3 | 4 | 5 | 6 | 7 | 8 | 9 | 10 | 11 | 12 | 13 | 14 | 15 | 16 | 17 | 18 | 19 | 20 | 21 |
|---|---|---|---|---|---|---|---|---|---|---|---|---|---|---|---|---|---|---|---|---|---|
| Ground | H | A | H | A | H | A | H | A | H | A | A | H | A | H | A | A | H | A | H | H | A |
| Result | W | D | W | L | W | W | W | L | W | W | W | D | L | L | W | L | L | W | L | W | L |
| Position | 5 | 5 | 3 | 5 | 2 | 1 | 1 | 3 | 2 | 2 | 1 | 2 | 2 | 4 | 2 | 4 | 4 | QF | QF | SF | SF |

Source: Mediotiempo.com
A = Away; H = Home; W = Win; D = Draw; L = Loss; QF = Quarter-final; SF = Semi-final

===== Matches =====
====== Quarter-finals ======
| 26 November 2020 First leg | UANL | 1–3 | Cruz Azul | San Nicolás de los Garzas |
| 19:00 CST (UTC−6) | Pizarro 46' | Report | Escobar 3'; Rodríguez 54'; Romo 71' | Stadium: Estadio Universitario; Attendance: 0 Referee: Diego Montaño Robles |

| 29 November 2020 Second leg | Cruz Azul | 0–1 (3–2 agg.) | UANL | Mexico City |
| 18:30 CST (UTC−6) | | Report | L. Quiñones 83' | Stadium: Estadio Azteca; Attendance: 0 Referee: Marco Antonio Ortiz |

====== Semi-finals ======
| 3 December 2020 First leg | Cruz Azul | 4–0 | Pumas UNAM | Mexico City |
| 21:00 CST (UTC−6) | Alvarado 2'; Baca 8'; Romo 13', 90+5' | Report | | Stadium: Estadio Azteca; Attendance: 0 Referee: Jorge Isaac Rojas |

| 6 December 2020 Second leg | Pumas UNAM | 4–0 (4–4 agg.) | Cruz Azul | Mexico City |
| 18:30 CST (UTC−6) | Dinenno 4', 37'; C. González 41'; Vigón 89' | | | Stadium: Estadio Olímpico Universitario; Attendance: 0 |
Note: 4–4 on aggregate and tied on away goals. Pumas UNAM advanced as the higher seed in the classification table.

==== Torneo Clausura ====
===== League table =====
| Pos | Team | Pld | W | D | L | GF | GA | GD | Pts | Qualification |
|---|---|---|---|---|---|---|---|---|---|---|
| 1 | Cruz Azul (C) | 17 | 13 | 2 | 2 | 26 | 11 | +15 | 41 | Qualification for the quarter-finals (Note: The first four places in the table qualified for the Liguilla quarter-finals.) |
| 2 | América | 17 | 12 | 2 | 3 | 26 | 14 | +12 | 38 (Note: América was penalized for having an ineligible player on the bench in their Week 7 match against Atlas. América originally won the match 0–2 but were docked the 3 points obtained for the victory. Atlas were given a 3–0 victory and the 3 points docked from América.) | Qualification for the quarter-finals |
| 3 | Puebla | 17 | 7 | 7 | 3 | 25 | 14 | +11 | 28 | Qualification for the quarter-finals |
| 4 | Monterrey | 17 | 8 | 4 | 5 | 22 | 13 | +9 | 28 | Qualification for the quarter-finals |
| 5 | Santos Laguna | 17 | 7 | 5 | 5 | 18 | 13 | +5 | 26 | Qualification for the Reclassification (Note: Teams ranked 5th to 12th in the table qualified for Reclassification) |

Source: Liga MX
Rules for classification: 1) Points; 2) Goal difference; 3) Number of goals scored; 4) Number of goals scored away; 5) Head-to-head results between tied teams; 6) Highest relegation coefficient; 7) Fair Play points
(C) Champions

===== Results summary =====
| Overall | | | | | | | | Home | | | | | | Away | | | | | |
| Pld | W | D | L | GF | GA | GD | Pts | W | D | L | GF | GA | GD | W | D | L | GF | GA | GD |
|---|---|---|---|---|---|---|---|---|---|---|---|---|---|---|---|---|---|---|---|
| 23 | 17 | 3 | 3 | 33 | 15 | +18 | 54 | 10 | 1 | 1 | 22 | 11 | +11 | 7 | 2 | 2 | 11 | 4 | +7 |

Last updated: 30 May 2021.
Source: Liga MX

===== Result by round =====
| Round | 1 | 2 | 3 | 4 | 5 | 6 | 7 | 8 | 9 | 10 | 11 | 12 | 13 | 14 | 15 | 16 | 17 | 18 | 19 | 20 | 21 | 22 | 23 |
|---|---|---|---|---|---|---|---|---|---|---|---|---|---|---|---|---|---|---|---|---|---|---|---|
| Ground | A | H | A | H | A | A | H | A | H | A | H | H | A | H | A | H | H | A | H | A | H | A | H |
| Result | L | L | W | W | W | W | W | W | W | W | W | W | W | W | D | W | D | L | W | D | W | W | D |
| Position | 15 | 17 | 12 | 8 | 4 | 3 | 1 | 1 | 1 | 1 | 1 | 1 | 1 | 1 | 1 | 1 | 1 | QF | QF | SF | SF | F | F |

Updated to match(es) played on 30 May 2021. Source: Mediotiempo.com
A = Away; H = Home; W = Win; D = Draw; L = Loss; F = Final; QF = Quarter-final; SF = Semi-final

===== Matches =====
====== Quarter-finals ======
| 12 May 2021 First leg | Toluca | 2–1 | Cruz Azul | Toluca |
| 19:00 CST | Canelo 26' (pen.); Estrada 51' (pen.) | Report | Fernández 33' | Stadium: Estadio Nemesio Díez; Attendance: 6,410; Referee: Marco Antonio Ortiz Nava |

| 15 May 2021 Second leg | Cruz Azul | 3–1 (4–3 agg.) | Toluca | Mexico City |
| 21:00 CST | Angulo 11'; Rodríguez 80' (pen.); Giménez 90+3' | Report | Canelo 14' | Stadium: Estadio Azteca; Attendance: 17,929; Referee: Fernando Hernández Gómez |

====== Semi-finals ======
| 19 May 2021 First leg | Pachuca | 0–0 | Cruz Azul | Pachuca |
| 20:30 CST | | Report | | Stadium: Estadio Hidalgo; Attendance: 12,221; Referee: Luis Enrique Santander |

| 22 May 2021 Second leg | Cruz Azul | 1–0 (1–0 agg.) | Pachuca | Mexico City |
| 20:00 CST | Giménez 50' | Report | | Stadium: Estadio Azteca; Attendance: 19,807; Referee: César Arturo Ramos |

====== Final ======
| 27 May 2021 First leg | Santos Laguna | 0–1 | Cruz Azul | Torreón |
| 21:00 CST | | Report | Romo 71' | Stadium: Estadio Corona; Attendance: 14,577; Referee: Fernando Guerrero |

| 30 May 2021 Second leg | Cruz Azul | 1–1 (2–1 agg.) | Santos Laguna | Mexico City |
| 20:15 CST | Rodríguez 51' | | Valdés 37' | Stadium: Estadio Azteca; Attendance: 21,016; Referee: Fernando Hernández Gómez |

=== CONCACAF Champions League ===
==== Round of 16 ====
| 6 April 2021 First leg | Arcahaie (Haiti) | 0–0 | (Mexico) Cruz Azul | Estadio Olimpico Felix Sanchez, Santo Domingo (Dominican Republic) (Note: Arcahaie played their round of 16 home match at Estadio Olímpico Félix Sánchez, Santo Domingo (Dominican Republic) instead of their regular stadium Stade Sylvio Cator, Port-au-Prince, due to insufficient stadium requirements.) |
| 22:00 (22:00 UTC−4) | | Report | | Attendance: 0 Referee: Kimbell Ward (Saint Kitts and Nevis) |

| 13 April 2021 Second leg | Cruz Azul (Mexico) | 8–0 (8–0 agg.) | (Haiti) Arcahaie | Estadio Azteca, Mexico City |
| 22:00 (21:00 UTC−5) | Gutiérrez 3'; Yotún 11'; Hernández 25'; Montoya 49', 64'; Reyes 61'; Escobar 69'; Angulo 76' | Report | | Referee: José Torres (Puerto Rico) |

==== Quarter-finals ====
| 27 April 2021 First leg | Toronto FC (Canada) | 1–3 | (Mexico) Cruz Azul | Raymond James Stadium, Tampa (United States) (Note: Toronto FC played their quarter-final home match at Raymond James Stadium, Tampa (United States) instead of their regular home stadium BMO Field, Toronto, due to COVID-19 travel restrictions between Canada and Mexico.) |
| 22:00 (22:00 UTC−4) | Osorio 20' | Report | Angulo 3', 34'; Aguilar 58' | Attendance: 0 Referee: Ricardo Montero (Costa Rica) |

| 4 May 2021 Second leg | Cruz Azul (Mexico) | 1–0 (4–1 agg.) | (Canada) Toronto FC | Estadio Azteca, Mexico City |
| 22:15 (21:15 UTC−5) | Angulo 31' | Report | | Attendance: 0 Referee: Saíd Martínez (Honduras) |

==== Semi-finals ====
| 11 August 2021 First leg | Monterrey (Mexico) | 1–0 | (Mexico) Cruz Azul | Estadio BBVA, Monterrey |
| 20:00 (19:00 UTC−5) | Meza 9' | Report | | Referee: Luis Enrique Santander (Mexico) |

| 16 September 2021 Second leg | Cruz Azul (Mexico) | 1–4 (1–5 agg.) | (Mexico) Monterrey | Estadio Azteca, Mexico City |
| 22:00 (21:00 UTC−5) | Pineda 10' | Report | Meza 7'; Vergara 17'; Funes Mori 24', 52' | Referee: César Ramos (Mexico) |

== Squad statistics ==
=== Goalscorers ===
Includes all competitive matches.

As of matches played 22 May 2021

| Rank | Pos. | No. | Player | Liga Apertura | Liguilla Apertura | Liga Clausura | Liguilla Clausura | Champions League | Total |
|---|---|---|---|---|---|---|---|---|---|
| 1 | FW | 21 | (Uruguay) Jonathan Rodríguez | 12 | 1 | 9 | 1 | 0 | 23 |
| 2 | FW | 17 | (Ecuador) Bryan Angulo | 0 | 0 | 2 | 1 | 4 | 7 |
| 3 | DF | 24 | (Paraguay) Juan Escobar | 2 | 1 | 2 | 0 | 1 | 6 |
| 3 | FW | 29 | (Mexico) Santiago Giménez | 4 | 0 | 0 | 2 | 0 | 6 |
| 5 | MF | 7 | (Mexico) Luis Romo | 0 | 3 | 2 | 0 | 0 | 5 |
| 6 | MF | 25 | (Mexico) Roberto Alvarado | 0 | 1 | 3 | 0 | 0 | 4 |
| 6 | MF | 31 | (Mexico) Orbelín Pineda | 2 | 0 | 2 | 0 | 0 | 4 |
| 8 | MF | 11 | (Mexico) Elías Hernández | 0 | 0 | 2 | 0 | 1 | 3 |
| 8 | MF | 28 | (Argentina) Guillermo Fernández | 0 | 0 | 2 | 1 | 0 | 3 |
| 10 | DF | 2 | (Paraguay) Pablo Aguilar | 0 | 0 | 1 | 0 | 1 | 2 |
| 10 | MF | 20 | (Mexico) Alexis Gutiérrez | 1 | 0 | 0 | 0 | 1 | 2 |
| 10 | MF | 9 | (Argentina) Walter Montoya | 0 | 0 | 0 | 0 | 2 | 2 |
| 10 | MF | 6 | (Peru) Yoshimar Yotún | 1 | 0 | 0 | 0 | 1 | 2 |
| 14 | DF | 4 | (Mexico) Julio César Domínguez | 1 | 0 | 0 | 0 | 0 | 1 |
| 14 | MF | 22 | (Mexico) Rafael Baca | 0 | 1 | 0 | 0 | 0 | 1 |
| 14 | DF | 16 | (Mexico) Adrián Aldrete | 0 | 0 | 1 | 0 | 0 | 1 |
| 14 | DF | 34 | (Mexico) Josué Reyes | 0 | 0 | 0 | 0 | 1 | 1 |
| Own Goals | | | | 0 | 0 | 0 | 0 | 0 | 0 |
| Total | | | | 23 | 7 | 25 | 5 | 12 | 73 |

Sources: Soccerway, Liga MX, CONCACAF Champions League
