= Cristian Jiménez (footballer, born 2002) =

Mexican footballer

Personal information
- Full name: Cristian Ramón Jiménez Ducloux
- Date of birth: 18 July 2002 (age 24)
- Place of birth: Gustavo A. Madero, Mexico City, Mexico
- Height: 1.88 m (6 ft 2 in)
- Position: Defensive midfielder

Team information
- Current team: Cruz Azul
- Number: 32

Youth career
- 2019–2023: Cruz Azul

Senior career*
Years	Team	Apps	(Gls)
2021–	Cruz Azul	7	(0)
2026–	→ Cruz Azul Hidalgo (loan)	2	(1)
- * Club domestic league appearances and goals as of 9 August 2026

Cristian Ramón Jiménez Ducloux (born 18 July 2002) is a Mexican professional footballer who plays as a defensive midfielder for Liga MX club Cruz Azul.

== Career statistics ==
As of match played on 9 August 2026

Appearances and goals by club, season and competition
Club	Season	League			Cup		Continental		Other		Total	
Club	Season	Division	Apps	Goals	Apps	Goals	Apps	Goals	Apps	Goals	Apps	Goals
Cruz Azul	2021–22	Liga MX	1	0	—		1 (Note: Appearance in CONCACAF Champions League)	0	—		2	0
Cruz Azul	2022–23	Liga MX	1	0	—		—		—		1	0
Cruz Azul	2023–24	Liga MX	2	0	—		—		—		2	0
Cruz Azul	2024–25	Liga MX	3	0	—		0	0	0	0	3	0
Cruz Azul	2026–27	Liga MX	0	0	—		0	0	2 (Note: Appearances in Leagues Cup)	0	2	0
Cruz Azul	Total		7	0	—		1	0	2	0	10	0
Cruz Azul Hidalgo (loan)	2026–27	Liga de Expansión MX	2	1	—		—		—		2	1
Career total			9	1	0	0	1	0	2	0	12	1

== Honours ==
Cruz Azul

- Liga MX: Clausura 2026
- Campeón de Campeones: 2021, 2026
- CONCACAF Champions Cup: 2025
