= Jaiber Jiménez =

Mexican footballer (born 1995)

Personal information
- Full name: Jaiber Jiménez Ramírez
- Date of birth: 7 January 1995 (age 31)
- Place of birth: Oaxaca, Mexico
- Height: 1.73 m (5 ft 8 in)
- Position: Left-back

Youth career
- 2015–2019: Cruz Azul

Senior career*
Years	Team	Apps	(Gls)
2019–2023	Cruz Azul	10	(0)
- * Club domestic league appearances and goals as of 11 September 2022

Jaiber Jiménez Ramírez (born 7 January 1995) is a Mexican professional footballer who plays as a left-back.

== Career statistics ==
=== Club ===
As of match played 11 September 2022

Club	Season	League			Cup		Continental		Other		Total	
Club	Season	Division	Apps	Goals	Apps	Goals	Apps	Goals	Apps	Goals	Apps	Goals
Cruz Azul	2019–20	Liga MX	3	0	—		2 (Note: Appearances in CONCACAF Champions League)	0	—		5	0
Cruz Azul	2020–21	Liga MX	2	0	—		2	0	—		4	0
Cruz Azul	2021–22	Liga MX	2	0	—		—		—		2	0
Cruz Azul	2022–23	Liga MX	3	0	—		—		—		3	0
Cruz Azul	Total		10	0	—		4	0	—		14	0
Career total			10	0	0	0	4	0	0	0	14	0

== Honours ==
Cruz Azul

- Liga MX: Guardianes 2021
- Campeón de Campeones: 2021
- Supercopa de la Liga MX: 2022
