= Ignacio Rivero =

Uruguayan footballer (born 1992)

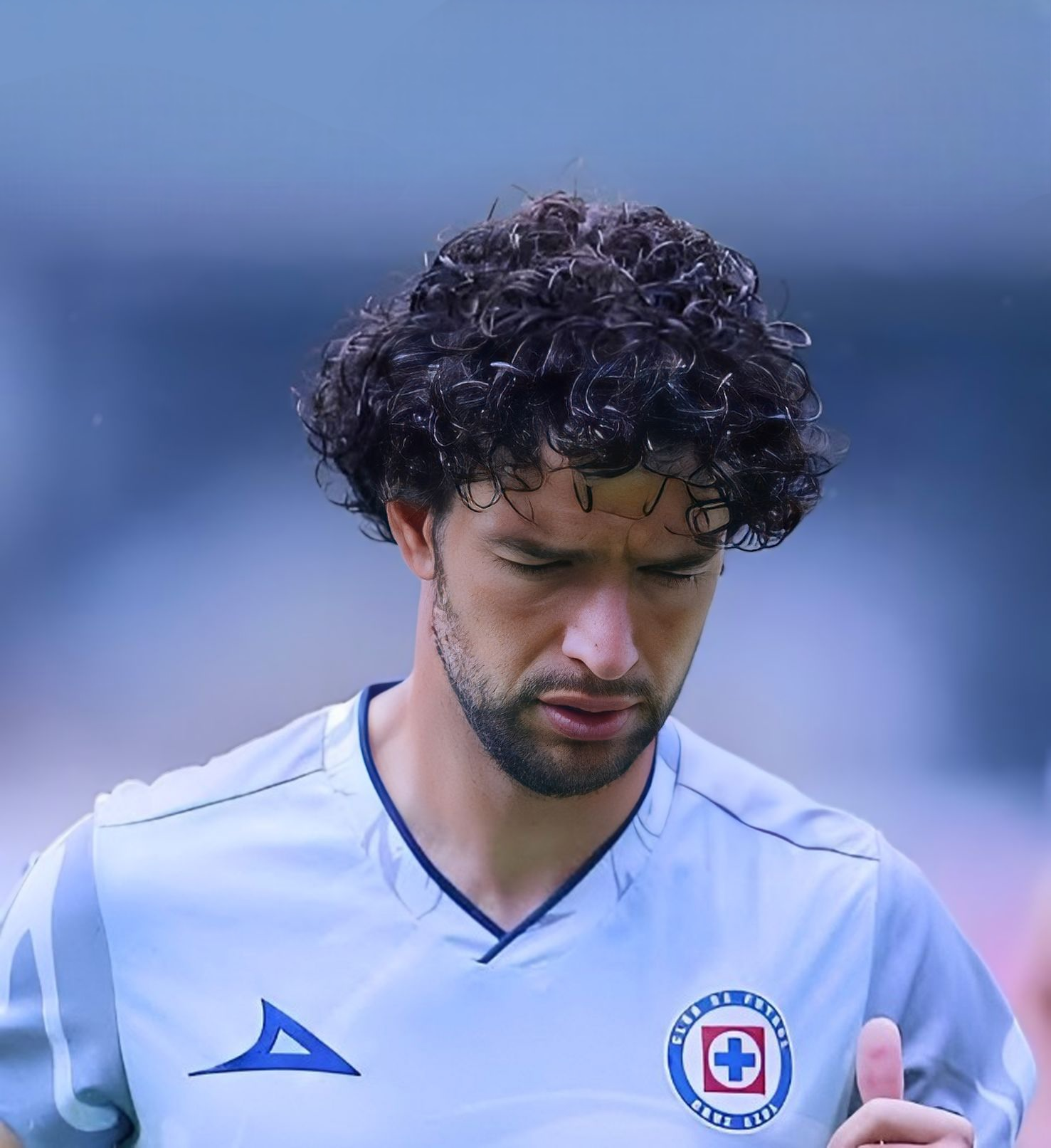
- Rivero with Cruz Azul in 2024

Personal information
- Full name: José Ignacio Rivero Segade
- Date of birth: 10 April 1992 (age 34)
- Place of birth: Montevideo, Uruguay
- Height: 1.69 m (5 ft 7 in)
- Position: Left-back

Team information
- Current team: Tijuana
- Number: 15

Senior career*
Years	Team	Apps	(Gls)
2012–2015	Central Español	77	(14)
2015–2018	Defensa	55	(3)
2018	→ Tijuana (loan)	18	(1)
2018–2021	Tijuana	62	(5)
2020–2021	→ Cruz Azul (loan)	38	(0)
2021–2025	Cruz Azul	164	(25)
2026–	Tijuana	27	(4)
- * Club domestic league appearances and goals as of 05:37, 26 October 2026 (UTC)

José Ignacio Rivero Segade (born 10 April 1992) is a Uruguayan professional footballer who plays as a midfielder and right-back for Liga MX club Tijuana.

== Career ==
Rivero made his professional debut with Central Español in September 2012. Over three seasons, he appeared in 77 matches and scored 14 goals, earning recognition for his versatility across multiple positions, including right back, left back, winger, and attacking midfielder.

In February 2015, he joined Defensa y Justicia in Argentina. During his time with the club, he played 66 matches, scored 3 goals, and featured in the Copa Sudamericana, establishing himself as a reliable squad member.

He signed with Tijuana in January 2018.

In July 2020, Rivero joined Cruz Azul on loan before completing a permanent transfer the following year. Over the next five years, he established himself as a pivotal figure in the squad, helping secure four official titles, including a league championship.

In January 2026, he returned to Tijuana.

== Career statistics ==
As of match played on 9 January 2026

Appearances and goals by club, season and competition
Club	Season	League			National cup (Note: Includes Copa Argentina, Copa MX)		Continental		Other		Total	
Club	Season	Division	Apps	Goals	Apps	Goals	Apps	Goals	Apps	Goals	Apps	Goals
Central Español	2011–12	Uruguayan Segunda División	9	1	—		—		—		9	1
Central Español	2012–13	Uruguayan Primera División	25	0	—		—		—		25	0
Central Español	2013–14	Uruguayan Segunda División	29	7	—		—		—		29	7
Central Español	2014–15	Uruguayan Segunda División	14	6	—		—		—		14	6
Central Español	Total		77	14	—		—		—		77	14
Defensa y Justicia	2014	Argentine Primera División	—		3	0	—		—		3	0
Defensa y Justicia	2015	Argentine Primera División	16	1	1	0	—		—		17	1
Defensa y Justicia	2016–17	Argentine Primera División	27	2	3	0	4 (Note: Appearances in Copa Sudamericana)	0	—		34	2
Defensa y Justicia	2017–18	Argentine Primera División	12	0	—		—		—		12	0
Defensa y Justicia	Total		55	3	7	0	4	0	—		66	3
Tijuana (loan)	2017–18	Liga MX	18	1	—		4 (Note: Appearances in CONCACAF Champions League/Champions Cup)	1	—		22	2
Tijuana	2018–19	Liga MX	34	2	7	0	—		—		41	2
Tijuana	2019–20	Liga MX	28	3	7	0	—		1 (Note: Appearances in Leagues Cup)	0	36	3
Tijuana	Total		80	6	14	0	4	1	1	0	99	7
Cruz Azul (loan)	2020–21	Liga MX	38	0	—		6	0	—		44	0
Cruz Azul	2021–22	Liga MX	36	2	—		6	0	2 (Note: One appearance in Campeón de Campeones, one appearance in Campeones Cup)	0	44	2
Cruz Azul	2022–23	Liga MX	35	2	—		—		1 (Note: Appearance in Supercopa de la Liga MX)	0	36	2
Cruz Azul	2023–24	Liga MX	37	4	—		—		3	0	40	4
Cruz Azul	2024–25	Liga MX	37	15	—		8	1	4	0	49	16
Cruz Azul	2025–26	Liga MX	19	2	—		0	0	4 (Note: Three appearances and one goal in Leagues Cup, one appearance in FIFA Intercontinental Cup)	1	23	3
Cruz Azul	Total		202	25	—		20	1	14	1	236	27
Tijuana	2025–26	Liga MX	1	0	—		—		—		1	0
Career total			415	48	21	0	28	2	15	1	479	51

== Honours ==
Central Español

- Uruguayan Segunda División: 2011–12

Cruz Azul

- Liga MX: Guardianes 2021
- Campeón de Campeones: 2021
- Supercopa de la Liga MX: 2022
- CONCACAF Champions Cup: 2025
