= Yonatthan Rak =

Uruguayan footballer (born 1993)

Personal information
- Full name: Yonatthan Nicolás Rak Barragán
- Date of birth: 18 August 1993 (age 33)
- Place of birth: Montevideo, Uruguay
- Height: 1.88 m (6 ft 2 in)
- Position: Defender

Team information
- Current team: Barracas Central
- Number: 15

Youth career
- Miramar Misiones

Senior career*
Years	Team	Apps	(Gls)
2012–2018	Miramar Misiones	43	(4)
2015–2016	→ Internacional (loan)	0	(0)
2018–2021	Montevideo City Torque	70	(4)
2021–2023	Tijuana	25	(0)
2022–2023	→ Peñarol (loan)	31	(2)
2024–2025	Central Córdoba SdE	13	(0)
2025–	Barracas Central	26	(0)
- * Club domestic league appearances and goals as of 17:04, 3 June 2026 (UTC)

Yonatthan Nicolás Rak Barragán (born 18 August 1993) is a Uruguayan professional footballer who plays as a defender for Argentine Primera División club Barracas Central.

== Career ==
Rak started his career with Uruguayan side Miramar Misiones, where he made 37 league appearances and scored three goals, but left due to financial problems.

In 2015, Rak was sent on loan to Internacional, one of the most successful clubs in Brazil.

Before the 2018 season, he signed for Uruguayan outfit Montevideo City Torque, where he received offers from Atlético Nacional, the most successful team in Colombia.

== Career statistics ==
=== Club ===
As of 16 May 2021

Club	Season	League			Cup		Continental		Other		Total	
Club	Season	Division	Apps	Goals	Apps	Goals	Apps	Goals	Apps	Goals	Apps	Goals
Miramar Misiones	2011–12	Uruguayan Segunda División	1	0	—		—		0	0	1	0
Miramar Misiones	2012–13	Uruguayan Segunda División	5	1	—		—		5 (Note: Appearances in Segunda División play-offs.)	0	10	1
Miramar Misiones	2013–14	Uruguayan Primera División	1	0	—		—		—		1	0
Miramar Misiones	2014–15	Uruguayan Segunda División	12	1	—		—		—		12	1
Miramar Misiones	2017	Uruguayan Segunda División	24	2	—		—		—		24	2
Miramar Misiones	Total		43	4	0	0	0	0	5	0	48	4
Internacional	2015	Campeonato Brasileiro Série A	0	0	0	0	0	0	—		0	0
Internacional	2016	Campeonato Brasileiro Série A	0	0	0	0	0	0	—		0	0
Internacional	Total		0	0	0	0	0	0	0	0	0	0
Montevideo City Torque	2018	Uruguayan Primera División	20	0	—		—		1 (Note: Appearance in Torneo Intermedio final.)	0	21	0
Montevideo City Torque	2019	Uruguayan Segunda División	17	0	—		—		—		17	0
Montevideo City Torque	2020	Uruguayan Primera División	32	4	—		—		—		32	4
Montevideo City Torque	2021	Uruguayan Primera División	1	0	—		6 (Note: Appearances in Copa Sudamericana.)	0	—		7	0
Montevideo City Torque	Total		70	4	0	0	6	0	1	0	77	4
Career total			113	8	0	0	6	0	6	0	125	8

== Honours ==
Montevideo City

- Uruguayan Segunda División: 2019

Peñarol

- Torneo Apertura: 2023

Central Córdoba (SdE)

- Copa Argentina: 2024
