= Sebastián Jurado =

Mexican footballer (born 1997)

Personal information
- Full name: Sebastián Jurado Roca
- Date of birth: 28 September 1997 (age 29)
- Place of birth: Veracruz, Mexico
- Height: 1.87 m (6 ft 2 in)
- Position: Goalkeeper

Team information
- Current team: Juárez
- Number: 1

Youth career
- 2013–2018: Veracruz

Senior career*
Years	Team	Apps	(Gls)
2018–2019	Veracruz	37	(0)
2020–2024	Cruz Azul	32	(0)
2024	→ Juárez (loan)	13	(0)
2025–	Juárez	77	(0)
2025	→ Pachuca (loan)	0	(0)

International career^{‡}
2019–2021	Mexico U23	5	(0)
Medal record
Men's football
Representing Mexico
Olympic Games
Bronze medal – third place	2020 Tokyo	Team
Olympic Qualifying Championship
Winner	2020 Mexico
Toulon Tournament
Third place	2019 France	Team
- * Club domestic league appearances and goals as of 20 November 2026 ‡ National team caps and goals as of 8 June 2021

Sebastián Jurado Roca (born 28 September 1997) is a Mexican professional footballer who plays as a goalkeeper for Liga MX club Juárez.

== Club career ==
=== Veracruz ===
A native of Veracruz, Jurado joined the youth academy of Tiburones Rojos de Veracruz in 2013, going through the various ranks.

On 9 November 2018, Jurado made his debut in the Liga MX in Veracruz's 2–2 draw against Querétaro. On 3 April 2019, it was announced that Jurado had signed a three-year contract extension with Veracruz, with the player stating that he was "happy to stay" at the club, despite reported interest from other clubs. Following the disaffiliation of Veracruz from the Liga MX at the end of the club's 2019 Apertura campaign, Jurado became a free agent.

=== Cruz Azul ===
On 19 December 2019, Jurado officially joined Cruz Azul. On 18 February, he made his club debut in the 2020 CONCACAF Champions League against Portmore United, winning 2–1.

== International career ==
=== Youth ===
Jurado was called up by Jaime Lozano to participate with the under-22 team that participated at the 2019 Toulon Tournament. He only appeared in the third place playoff against the Republic of Ireland, during the penalty shoot-out he would stop two of Ireland's shots, helping Mexico win the match.

Jurado also participated at the 2020 CONCACAF Olympic Qualifying Championship, appearing in three matches, where Mexico won the competition. He was subsequently called up to participate in the 2020 Summer Olympics. Jurado won the bronze medal with the Olympic team.

== Career statistics ==
=== Club ===
As of match played on 20 November 2026

Appearances and goals by club, season and competition
Club	Season	League			Cup		Continental		Global		Other		Total	
Club	Season	Division	Apps	Goals	Apps	Goals	Apps	Goals	Apps	Goals	Apps	Goals	Apps	Goals
Veracruz	2017–18	Liga MX	—		1	0	—		—		—		1	0
Veracruz	2018–19	Liga MX	19	0	2	0	—		—		—		21	0
Veracruz	2019–20	Liga MX	18	0	—		—		—		—		18	0
Veracruz	Total		37	0	3	0	—		—		—		40	0
Cruz Azul	2019–20	Liga MX	—		—		2 (Note: Appearances in CONCACAF Champions League)	0	—		—		2	0
Cruz Azul	2020–21	Liga MX	3	0	4 (Note: Appearances in Copa GNP por México)	0	2	0	—		—		9	0
Cruz Azul	2021–22	Liga MX	14	0	—		5	0	—		—		19	0
Cruz Azul	2022–23	Liga MX	11	0	1 (Note: Appearance in Supercopa de la Liga MX)	0	—		—		—		12	0
Cruz Azul	2023–24	Liga MX	4	0	—		—		—		1 (Note: Appearances in Leagues Cup)	0	5	0
Cruz Azul	Total		32	0	5	0	9	0	—		1	0	47	0
Juárez (loan)	2023–24	Liga MX	13	0	—		—		—		3	0	16	0
Juárez	2024–25	Liga MX	22	0	—		—		—		—		22	0
Juárez	2025–26	Liga MX	38	0	—		—		—		3	0	41	0
Juárez	2026–27	Liga MX	17	0	—		—		—		3	0	20	0
Juárez	Total		77	0	—		—		—		6	0	83	0
Pachuca (loan)	2025–26	Liga MX	—		—		—		1 (Note: Appearance in FIFA Club World Cup)	0	—		16	0
Career total			159	0	8	0	9	0	1	0	10	0	187	0

== Honours ==
Cruz Azul

- Liga MX: Guardianes 2021
- Supercopa de la Liga MX: 2022

Mexico U23

- CONCACAF Olympic Qualifying Championship: 2020
- Olympic Bronze Medal: 2020

Individual

- Liga MX Best Rookie: 2018–19
