= Andrés Gudiño =

Mexican footballer (born 1997)

Personal information
- Full name: Andrés Guillermo Gudiño Portillo Ronaldo
- Date of birth: 26 January 1997 (age 29)
- Place of birth: Mérida, Yucatán, Mexico
- Height: 1.85 m (6 ft 1 in)
- Position: Goalkeeper

Team information
- Current team: Cruz Azul
- Number: 1

Youth career
- 2013–2014: Pioneros de Cancún

Senior career*
Years	Team	Apps	(Gls)
2015–2018	Venados	0	(0)
2017	→ Inter Playa (loan)	8	(0)
2019–	Cruz Azul	45	(0)
2019–2020	→ Cruz Azul Hidalgo (loan)	32	(0)
2022	→ Tepatitlán (loan)	16	(0)
- * Club domestic league appearances and goals as of 25 October 2026

Andrés Guillermo Gudiño Portillo (born 27 January 1997) is a Mexican professional footballer who plays as a goalkeeper for Liga MX club Cruz Azul.

== Career ==
=== Early career ===
Gudiño began his career with Pioneros de Cancún in the third division before joining Venados of the Ascenso MX in 2015, spending a loan spell at Inter Playa del Carmen in 2017. He left Venados in 2018 and signed for Cruz Azul Hidalgo, the then-affiliate of Cruz Azul in the Liga Premier.

=== Cruz Azul ===
Gudiño was promoted to the Cruz Azul first-team squad in 2019 under coach Pedro Caixinha. He spent the 2019–20 season on loan back at Cruz Azul Hidalgo, and a further loan spell at Tepatitlán in the Liga de Expansión MX in 2021–22.

He made his official debut for Cruz Azul on 6 April 2021 in the CONCACAF Champions League against Haiti's Arcahaie, and his Liga MX debut came on 26 July 2021 against Mazatlán. For several seasons he served as backup behind José de Jesús Corona and later Kevin Mier, making sporadic domestic and CONCACAF appearances.

Mier suffered a fractured tibia after a challenge by Adalberto Carrasquilla in a Apertura 2025 match against Pumas UNAM on 9 November 2025, ruling him out for several months. Gudiño took over as starting goalkeeper, making his first career appearance in the liguilla play-offs as Cruz Azul went on to also compete in that season's edition of the FIFA Intercontinental Cup.

He retained the starting role into the Clausura 2026 campaign, and remained first-choice when Mier returned to fitness in March 2026. Mier reclaimed the starting spot late in the regular phase, following a defensive error by Gudiño in a loss to Pachuca, and started the remainder of the liguilla and the final, in which Cruz Azul beat Pumas UNAM to win the Clausura 2026 title. Gudiño was subsequently linked with a move away from the club, though no transfer materialized and he remained at Cruz Azul for the 2026–27 season.

== Career statistics ==
As of match played on 25 October 2026

Appearances and goals by club, season and competition
Club	Season	League			Cup		Continental		Other		Total	
Club	Season	Division	Apps	Goals	Apps	Goals	Apps	Goals	Apps	Goals	Apps	Goals
Venados	2017–18	Ascenso MX	—		2	0	—		—		2	0
Cruz Azul	2020–21	Liga MX	—		—		2 (Note: Appearances in CONCACAF Champions League/Cup)	0	—		2	0
Cruz Azul	2021–22	Liga MX	6	0	—		—		—		6	0
Cruz Azul	2023–24	Liga MX	14	0	—		—		2 (Note: Appearances in Leagues Cup)	0	16	0
Cruz Azul	2024–25	Liga MX	1	0	—		2	0	—		3	0
Cruz Azul	2025–26	Liga MX	19	0	—		2	0	1 (Note: Appearance in FIFA Intercontinental Cup)	0	22	0
Cruz Azul	2026–27	Liga MX	5	0	—		—		—		5	0
Cruz Azul	Total		45	0	—		6	0	3	0	54	0
Tepatitlán (loan)	2021–22	Liga de Expansión MX	16	0	—		—		—		16	0
Career total			61	0	2	0	6	0	3	0	72	0

== Honours ==
Cruz Azul

- Liga MX: Guardianes 2021, Clausura 2026
- Campeón de Campeones: 2021, 2026
- Supercopa de la Liga MX: 2022
- CONCACAF Champions Cup: 2025
