= 2021 Campeón de Campeones =

- Promotional poster featuring Luis Montes and Jonathan Rodríguez
- Event: 2021 Campeón de Campeones
León	Cruz Azul
1	2
- Date: 18 July 2021
- Venue: Dignity Health Sports Park, Carson, United States
- Referee: Luis Enrique Santander (Guanajuato)
- Attendance: 27,674

The 2021 Campeón de Campeones was the 48th edition of the Campeón de Campeones, an annual football super cup match. (Note: The edition number was calculated based on figures provided by Goal.com, with the first Campeón de Campeones having been held in 1941–42.) It took place on 18 July 2021 between León, the Guardianes 2020 champion, and Cruz Azul, the Guardianes 2021 champion. The match took place at Dignity Health Sports Park in Carson, California, hosting for the fifth consecutive time. Like previous editions, the Campeón de Campeones was contested at a neutral venue in the United States.

Cruz Azul won the match 2–1 to secure their third Campeón de Campeones title and qualified for the 2021 Campeones Cup, facing the MLS Cup 2020 champions Columbus Crew on 29 September 2021 at Lower.com Field in Columbus, Ohio.

== Match details ==
18 July 2021
16:30 PDT

León	1–2	Cruz Azul
Ormeño 82'	Report	Rodríguez 60', 67'

Dignity Health Sports Park, Carson
Attendance: 27,674
Referee: Luis Enrique Santander (Guanajuato)

=== Details ===
León	Cruz Azul

GK	31	(Mexico) Iván Vázquez Mellado
DF	28	(Mexico) David Ramírez		(substituted off) 90+2'
DF	4	(Colombia) Andrés Mosquera
DF	21	(Colombia) Jaine Barreiro	(yellow card) 70'
DF	6	(Colombia) William Tesillo
MF	13	(Ecuador) Ángel Mena
MF	8	(Mexico) Iván Rodríguez		(substituted off) 64'
MF	26	(Mexico) Fidel Ambríz	(red card) 90+7'
MF	16	(Chile) Jean Meneses		(substituted off) 77'
MF	10	(Mexico) Luis Montes (c)	(yellow card) 42'
FW	20	(Argentina) Emmanuel Gigliotti
Substitutions:
GK	192	(Mexico) Bernardo Aguilar
DF	3	(Mexico) Gil Burón
DF	23	(Argentina) Ramiro González
MF	208	(Mexico) Óscar Villa
MF	11	(Mexico) Elías Hernández		(substituted on) 90+2'
MF	25	(Colombia) Omar Fernández		(substituted on) 64'
FW	7	(Chile) Víctor Dávila
FW	14	(Peru) Santiago Ormeño		(substituted on) 77'
FW	195	(Mexico) Juan Rangel
Manager:
(Argentina) Ariel Holan

GK	1	(Mexico) José de Jesús Corona (c)
DF	24	(Paraguay) Juan Escobar
DF	4	(Mexico) Julio César Domínguez
DF	23	(Paraguay) Pablo Aguilar
DF	15	(Uruguay) Ignacio Rivero	(yellow card) 70'	(substituted off) 77'
MF	28	(Argentina) Guillermo Fernández	(yellow card) 62'
MF	22	(Mexico) Rafael Baca
MF	19	(Peru) Yoshimar Yotún	(yellow card) 18' (yellow-red card) 80'
MF	17	(Ecuador) Brayan Angulo		(substituted off) 46'
MF	32	(Argentina) Walter Montoya		(substituted off) 78'
FW	21	(Uruguay) Jonathan Rodríguez		(substituted off) 85'
Substitutions:
GK	30	(Mexico) Andrés Gudiño
DF	2	(Mexico) Josué Reyes
DF	3	(Mexico) Jaiber Jiménez
DF	5	(Mexico) Alexis Peña		(substituted on) 78'
DF	12	(Mexico) José Joaquín Martínez		(substituted on) 77'
MF	8	(Mexico) Luis Ángel Mendoza		(substituted on) 85'
MF	18	(Argentina) Lucas Passerini
MF	20	(Mexico) Alexis Gutiérrez
MF	206	(Mexico) Cristian Jiménez
FW	29	(Mexico) Santiago Giménez		(substituted on) 46'
Manager:
(Peru) Juan Reynoso

Assistant referees:
Christian Espinosa Zavala (Mexico City)
José Ibrahim Martínez (Guerrero)
Fourth official:
Marco Antonio Ortiz (Durango)
Video assistant referee:
Jorge Isaac Rojas (Mexico City)
Assistant video assistant referee:
Eduardo Galván Basulto (Mexico City)
