= Luis Romo =

Mexican footballer (born 1995)

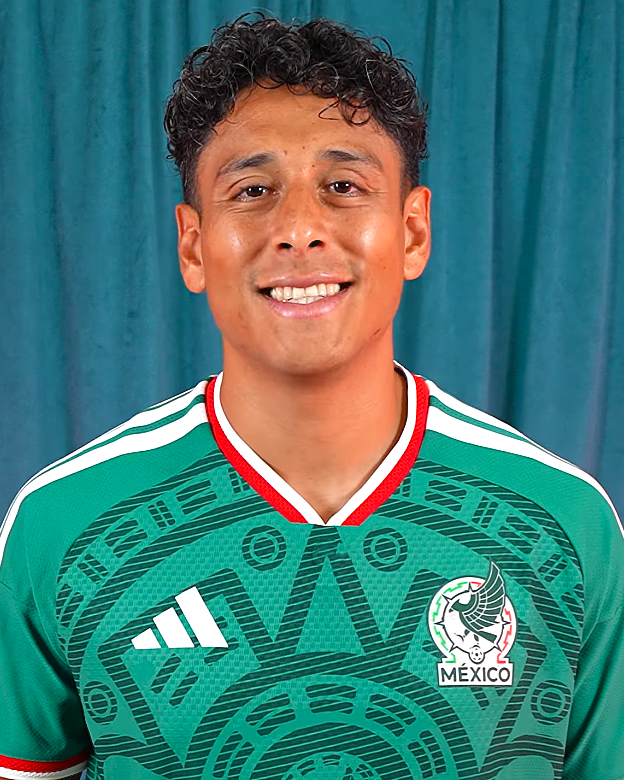
- Romo with Mexico in 2025

Personal information
- Full name: Luis Francisco Romo Barrón
- Date of birth: 5 June 1995 (age 31)
- Place of birth: Los Mochis, Sinaloa, Mexico
- Height: 1.82 m (6 ft 0 in)
- Positions: Defensive midfielder; centre-back

Team information
- Current team: Guadalajara
- Number: 7

Youth career
- 2010: Cruz Azul
- 2011–2016: Querétaro

Senior career*
Years	Team	Apps	(Gls)
2016–2019	Querétaro	48	(4)
2016–2018	→ Querétaro Premier (loan)	51	(9)
2020–2021	Cruz Azul	57	(9)
2022–2024	Monterrey	90	(5)
2024	Cruz Azul	20	(0)
2025–	Guadalajara	53	(2)

International career^{‡}
2021	Mexico Olympic (O.P.)	6	(2)
2019–	Mexico	70	(5)
Medal record
Men's football
Representing Mexico
CONCACAF Gold Cup
Winner	2023 United States–Canada	Team
CONCACAF Nations League
Winner	2025 United States
Runner-up	2021 United States
Runner-up	2024 United States
Third place	2023 United States
Olympic Games
Bronze medal – third place	2020 Tokyo	Team
- * Club domestic league appearances and goals as of 8 November 2026 ‡ National team caps and goals as of 14 November 2026

Luis Francisco Romo Barrón (Spanish pronunciation: [luˈis fɾansˈisko ɾɾˈomo baɾɾˈon]; born 5 June 1995) is a Mexican professional footballer who plays as a defensive midfielder or centre-back for Liga MX club Guadalajara, whom he captains, and the Mexico national team.

== Early life ==
Born in Los Mochis, Sinaloa, Romo began his career playing for the youth squads of Cruz Azul. At the age of 15, Romo was cut by Cruz Azul, and eventually joined the youth squads of Querétaro.

== Club career ==
=== Querétaro ===
==== 2018–19: Debut season ====
He made his Liga MX debut with Querétaro on 20 July 2018, in the team's opening match of the season, against Atlas.

==== 2019–20: Assuming the captaincy and departure ====
By the 2019 Apertura, he was named club captain. It proved to be Romo's final campaign with Querétaro, playing in 17 matches and scoring three goals.

=== Cruz Azul ===
==== 2019–20: Debut season ====
In January 2020, he joined Cruz Azul, returning to the club he had played for as a youngster. He made his league debut for the club on the 17th of the month in a 2–1 defeat to Atlético San Luis.

==== 2020–21: Liga MX Best XI and first league title ====
On 25 July, he scored his first goal for La Máquina in a 3–0 victory over Santos Laguna. On 3 December, he scored his first brace in Cruz Azul's 4–0 first leg victory over Pumas in the Guardianes 2020 semi-finals. He played in the return leg of the series which Cruz Azul lost 4–0, resulting in the team's elimination 4–4 on aggregate.

Romo played an integral part in Cruz Azul's championship-winning Guardianes 2021 campaign. He played in 19 matches, scored three goals, and provided seven assists, and was named the league's best player.

==== 2021–22: Final season and departure ====
On 6 January 2022, Romo announced his official departure from Cruz Azul on social media.

=== Monterrey ===
Shortly after departing from Cruz Azul, it was officially confirmed that Romo had signed with Monterrey. During the presentation, Romo declared that he wanted to become successful at the club like Jesús Arellano, who he idolized as a kid.

=== Return to Cruz Azul ===
On 8 July 2024, Romo announced that he would be making his return to Cruz Azul.

=== Guadalajara ===
In January 2025, Romo joined Guadalajara in an exchange that included Jesús Orozco joining Cruz Azul and Cruz Azul paying an additional $4.5 million.

== International career ==
=== Youth ===
==== 2021: Summer Olympics ====
Romo was called up by Jaime Lozano as one of three over-age reinforcements for the 2020 Summer Olympics in Tokyo. He won the bronze medal with the Olympic team.

=== Senior ===
==== 2019: Beginnings ====
Romo received his first call up to the senior national team by Gerardo Martino, and made his debut on 19 November 2019 in the 2–1 CONCACAF Nations League victory against Bermuda.

==== 2022: First FIFA World Cup ====
In October 2022, Romo was named in Mexico's preliminary 31-man squad for the 2022 FIFA World Cup, and in November, he was ultimately included in the final 26-man roster, but did not receive any minutes on the field during the tournament.

==== 2023–2025: First titles ====
Romo was a member of the Mexico teams that captured the 2023 CONCACAF Gold Cup and the 2024–25 CONCACAF Nations League, with both titles secured by victories over Panama in the finals.

==== 2026: Second FIFA World Cup ====
Romo was named in the 26-man squad for the 2026 FIFA World Cup, hosted on home soil. He scored his first World Cup goal and earned Man of the Match award in a 1–0 victory over South Korea, securing his nation's qualification for the knockout stage.

== Personal life ==
Romo is married to his teenage sweetheart María Fernanda, with whom he has two children, a son and a daughter.

== Career statistics ==
=== Club ===
As of match played on 8 November 2026

Appearances and goals by club, season amd competition
Club	Season	League			Copa MX		Continental		Intercontinental		Other		Total	
Club	Season	Division	Apps	Goals	Apps	Goals	Apps	Goals	Apps	Goals	Apps	Goals	Apps	Goals
Querétaro	2016–17	Liga MX	—		1	0	—		—		—		1	0
Querétaro	2017–18	Liga MX	—		6	0	—		—		—		6	0
Querétaro	2018–19	Liga MX	29	1	3	0	—		—		—		32	1
Querétaro	2019–20	Liga MX	19	3	1	0	—		—		—		20	3
Querétaro	Total		48	4	11	0	—		—		—		59	4
Cruz Azul	2019–20	Liga MX	9	2	—		2 (Note: Appearances in CONCACAF Champions Cup)	0	—		—		11	2
Cruz Azul	2020–21	Liga MX	39	6	5 (Note: Appearances in Copa GNP por México)	0	4	0	—		—		48	6
Cruz Azul	2021–22	Liga MX	9	1	—		—		—		1 (Note: Appearance in Campeones Cup)	0	10	1
Cruz Azul	Total		57	9	5	0	6	0	—		1	0	64	9
Monterrey	2021–22	Liga MX	17	1	—		—		2 (Note: Appearances in FIFA Club World Cup)	0	—		19	1
Monterrey	2022–23	Liga MX	40	3	—		—		—		—		40	3
Monterrey	2023–24	Liga MX	33	1	—		7	1	—		6 (Note: Appearances in Leagues Cup)	0	46	2
Monterrey	Total		90	5	—		7	1	2	0	6	0	105	6
Cruz Azul	2024–25	Liga MX	20	0	—		—		—		4	0	24	0
Guadalajara	2024–25	Liga MX	13	1	—		4	0	—		—		17	1
Guadalajara	2025–26	Liga MX	28	1	—		—		—		3	0	31	1
Guadalajara	2026–27	Liga MX	12	0	—		—		—		3	0	15	0
Guadalajara	Total		53	2	—		4	0	—		6	0	63	2
Career total			268	21	16	0	17	1	2	0	17	0	320	22

=== International ===
As of match played on 14 November 2026

Appearances and goals by national team and year
National team	Year	Apps	Goals
Mexico	2019	1	0
Mexico	2020	4	0
Mexico	2021	12	0
Mexico	2022	10	1
Mexico	2023	15	2
Mexico	2024	12	1
Mexico	2025	4	0
Mexico	2026	12	1
Total		70	5

Scores and results list Mexico's goal tally first, score column indicates score after each Romo goal.

List of international goals scored by Luis Romo
No.	Date	Venue	Cap	Opponent	Score	Result	Competition
1	14 June 2022	Independence Park, Kingston, Jamaica	24	Jamaica	1–1	1–1	2022–23 CONCACAF Nations League A
2	25 June 2023	NRG Stadium, Houston, United States	31	Honduras	1–0	4–0	2023 CONCACAF Gold Cup
3	25 June 2023	NRG Stadium, Houston, United States	31	Honduras	2–0	4–0	2023 CONCACAF Gold Cup
4	7 September 2024	Rose Bowl, Pasadena, United States	50	New Zealand	3–0	3–0	Friendly
5	18 June 2026	Estadio Akron, Zapopan, Mexico	64	South Korea	1–0	1–0	2026 FIFA World Cup

== Honours ==
Cruz Azul

- Liga MX: Guardianes 2021

Mexico Olympic

- Olympic Bronze Medal: 2020

Mexico

- CONCACAF Gold Cup: 2023
- CONCACAF Nations League: 2024–25

Individual

- Liga MX Best XI: Guardianes 2020, Guardianes 2021
- Liga MX Player of the Month: August 2020, February 2021, May 2021
- Liga MX Most Valuable Player: Guardianes 2021
- Liga MX Best Defensive Midfielder: 2020–21
- Liga MX All-Star: 2021
- The Best of America Best Liga MX Player: 2021
- Liga MX top assist provider: Apertura 2024 (Shared)
