= Alexis Peña (Mexican footballer) =

Mexican footballer (born 1996)

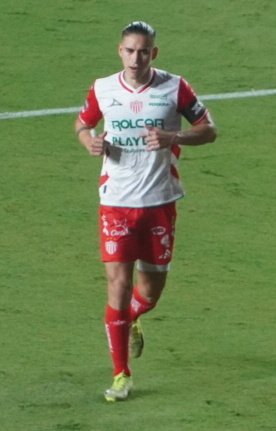
- Peña with Necaxa in 2025

Personal information
- Full name: Alexis Francisco Peña López
- Date of birth: 13 January 1996 (age 30)
- Place of birth: Culiacán, Sinaloa, Mexico
- Height: 1.87 m (6 ft 2 in)
- Position: Centre-back

Team information
- Current team: Necaxa
- Number: 4

Youth career
- 2012–2017: Pachuca

Senior career*
Years	Team	Apps	(Gls)
2015–2018	Pachuca	27	(1)
2019	Necaxa	30	(0)
2020–2022	Guadalajara	0	(0)
2021	→ Cruz Azul (loan)	10	(0)
2022	→ Necaxa (loan)	48	(1)
2023–	Necaxa	94	(5)

International career^{‡}
2023–	Mexico	2	(0)
- * Club domestic league appearances and goals as of 6 November 2026 ‡ National team caps and goals as of 31 May 2024

Alexis Francisco Peña López (born 13 January 1996) is a Mexican professional footballer who plays as a centre-back for Liga MX club Necaxa.

== International career ==
Peña made his debut for the senior Mexico national team on 16 December 2023 in a friendly against Colombia.

== Honours ==
Cruz Azul

- Liga MX: Guardianes 2021
- Campeón de Campeones: 2021

Individual

- Liga MX All-Star: 2024
