= José Joaquín Martínez =

Mexican footballer (born 1987)

Personal information
- Full name: José Joaquín Martinez
- Date of birth: 22 February 1987 (age 39)
- Place of birth: Mexico City, Mexico
- Height: 1.77 m (5 ft 10 in)
- Position: Right-back

Senior career*
Years	Team	Apps	(Gls)
2008–2012	América	38	(1)
2012–2015	Necaxa	103	(5)
2015–2019	Pachuca	66	(2)
2017	→ Zacatecas (loan)	21	(0)
2019–2020	→ Morelia (loan)	29	(1)
2020–2023	Cruz Azul	59	(0)
2024	Peluche Caligari		
2024–2025	Olimpo United		
2025	Galácticos del Caribe		
2026–	Simios FC		
- * Club domestic league appearances and goals as of 29 February 2024

José Joaquín Martínez Valadez (born 22 February 1987) is a former Mexican professional footballer who last played as a right-back. His nickname is Shaggy, as he bears a resemblance to the Scooby-Doo character, Shaggy.

== Club career ==
Martínez played 38 Primera División matches for Club América before being released in 2012.

After spending several seasons at the Ascenso MX with Necaxa, Martínez would finally go on to a resurgence to the first division with Pachuca. With Pachuca, Martínez has won a Liga MX title and has been an essential part of Diego Alonso's tactics. Martínez would again spend one semester at Mineros de Zacatecas before returning to Pachuca during the summer 2017 transfer window to replace the departure of Stefan Medina. Martínez left Pachuca to join Morelia on 1 July 2019.

== Honours ==
América

- InterLiga: 2008

Pachuca

- Liga MX: Clausura 2016
- CONCACAF Champions League: 2016–17
- FIFA Club World Cup Third Place: 2017

Necaxa

- Ascenso MX: Apertura 2014
- Campeón de Ascenso runner-up: 2014–15

Cruz Azul

- Liga MX: Guardianes 2021
- Campeón de Campeones: 2021
- Supercopa de la Liga MX: 2022

Olimpo United

- Américas Kings League: December 2024

Galácticos del Caribe

- Américas Kings League runner-up: May 2025

Individual

- Américas Kings League MVP: May 2025
- Leyendas Morelia: 2026
