= Pablo Aguilar (footballer, born 1987) =

Paraguayan footballer

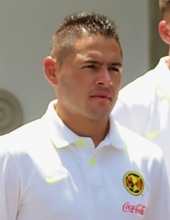
- Aguilar with América in 2016

Personal information
- Full name: Pablo César Aguilar Benítez
- Date of birth: 2 April 1987 (age 39)
- Place of birth: Luque, Paraguay
- Height: 1.80 m (5 ft 11 in)
- Position: Centre-back

Team information
- Current team: Sportivo Luqueño
- Number: 23

Senior career*
| Years | Team | Apps | (Gls) |
| 2004–2007 | Sportivo Luqueño | 82 | (8) |
| 2008–2009 | Colón | 34 | (3) |
| 2009–2010 | San Luis | 31 | (2) |
| 2010–2011 | → Arsenal de Sarandí (loan) | 32 | (2) |
| 2011–2012 | → Sportivo Luqueño (loan) | 18 | (0) |
| 2012–2013 | → Tijuana (loan) | 32 | (6) |
| 2013 | Tijuana | 17 | (1) |
| 2014–2017 | América | 135 | (15) |
| 2018 | Tijuana | 20 | (0) |
| 2018–2022 | Cruz Azul | 122 | (11) |
| 2022 | Libertad | 6 | (0) |
| 2023– | Sportivo Luqueño | 59 | (4) |

International career
| 2007–2016 | Paraguay | 28 | (4) |
- * Club domestic league appearances and goals as of 6 December 2023

Pablo César Aguilar Benítez (born 2 April 1987) is a Paraguayan professional footballer who plays as a centre-back who plays for Sportivo Luqueño.

From March to July 2017, Aguilar served a ten-match suspension after head-butting a referee.

== Club career ==
=== Early career ===
Aguilar won the Paraguayan Primera División title with his first club, Sportivo Luqueño, in 2007. He then transferred to Argentine Primera División side Colón de Santa Fe, where he played for one year. Subsequently, Aguilar played for San Luis of the Mexican Primera División, before joining Argentine Primera's side Arsenal de Sarandí.

=== Tijuana ===
In 2012, Aguilar was loaned to Club Tijuana. He started in 20 matches for the club during the Apertura tournament, which Tijuana won, defeating Toluca in the final, even scoring one of the goals himself.

=== América ===
On 18 December 2013, it was announced that Aguilar was transferred to Club América, with the announcement being made on the club's Twitter account. On 8 March 2017, during the Copa MX round-of-16 match against Tijuana, Aguilar headbutted referee Fernando Hernández. Despite initially being given a ten-game suspension, a strike by the referee's association protesting the punishments of Aguilar and Enrique Triverio of Toluca ultimately led to a revised year-long ban for Aguilar from any official football activity. On 31 March, it was reported that both Aguilar and Triverio would appeal their bans to the Court of Arbitration for Sport.

=== Cruz Azul ===
In the summer of 2018, Aguilar officially became a player for Cruz Azul. On 21 July 2018, Aguilar debuted in a 3–0 victory against Puebla and played the 90 minutes.

== International career ==
As of 3 June 2015, Aguilar has played in 22 games with the Paraguay national team, scoring four times. He scored his first goal on 17 October 2012 in the 1–0 victory against Peru.

=== International goals ===
Scores and results list Paraguay's goal tally first.

| # | Date | Venue | Opponent | Score | Result | Competition |
|---|---|---|---|---|---|---|
| 1. | 17 October 2012 | Estadio Defensores del Chaco, Asunción | Peru | 1–0 | 1–0 | 2014 World Cup qualifier |
| 2. | 15 November 2012 | Estadio Feliciano Cáceres, Luque | Guatemala | 2–0 | 3–1 | Friendly |
| 3. | 15 November 2012 | Estadio Feliciano Cáceres, Luque | Guatemala | 3–1 | 3–1 | Friendly |
| 4. | 6 February 2013 | Estadio Dr. Nicolás Léoz, Asunción | El Salvador | 1–0 | 3–0 | Friendly |

== Personal life ==
In 2015, Aguilar became a naturalized Mexican citizen.

== Honours ==
Sportivo Luqueño

- Primera División: Apertura 2007

Tijuana

- Liga MX: Apertura 2012

América

- Liga MX: Apertura 2014
- CONCACAF Champions League: 2014–15, 2015–16

Cruz Azul

- Liga MX: Guardianes 2021
- Copa MX: Apertura 2018
- Campeón de Campeones: 2021
- Supercopa MX: 2019
- Leagues Cup: 2019

Individual

- Liga MX Defender of the Year: 2018–19
- Liga MX Best XI: Guardianes 2021
- Liga MX All-Star: 2021

== See also ==
- Players and Records in Paraguayan Football
