= Bryan Angulo =

Ecuadorian footballer (born 1995)

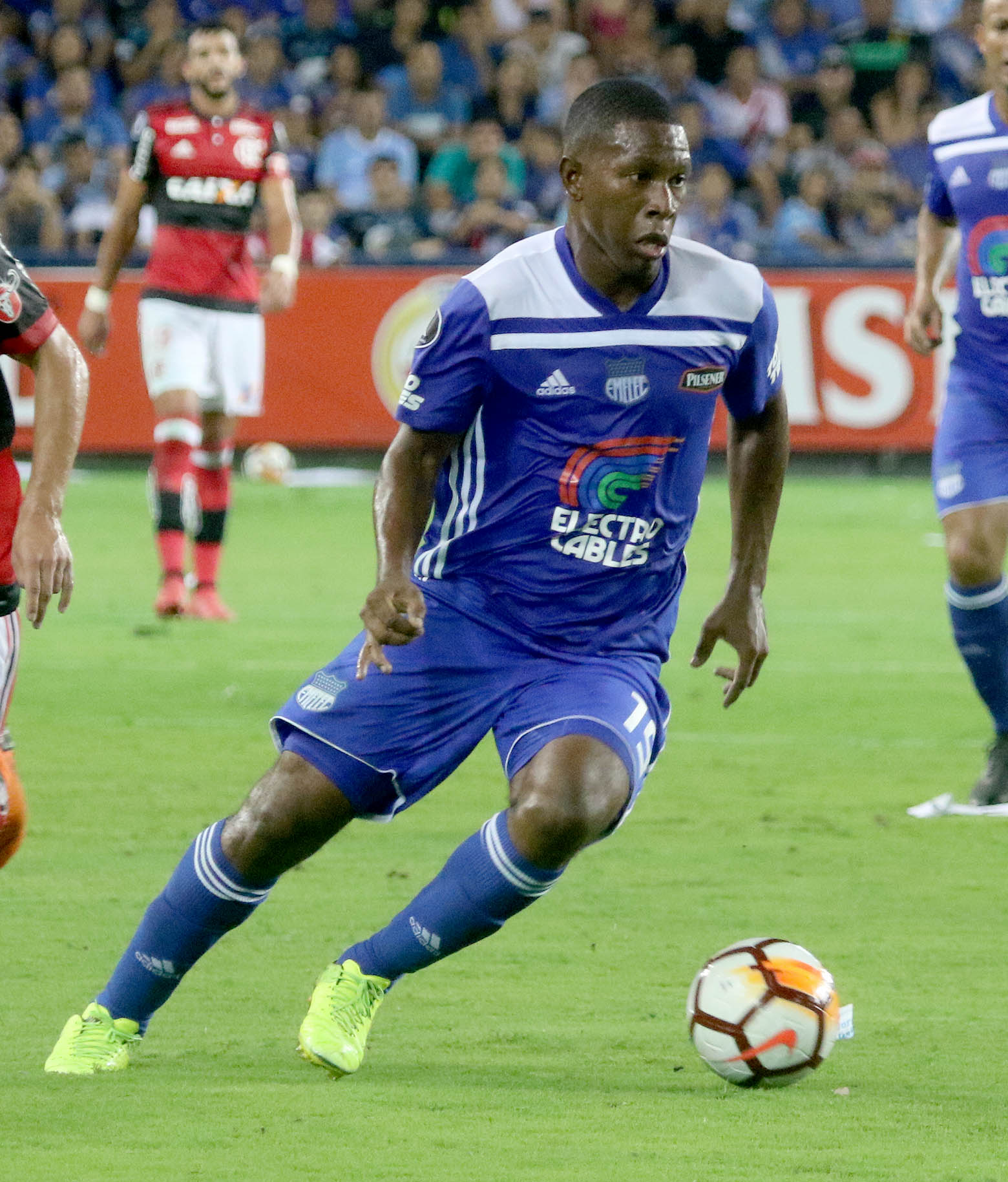
- Angulo with Emelec in 2018

Personal information
- Full name: Bryan Dennis Angulo Tenorio
- Date of birth: 30 November 1995 (age 30)
- Place of birth: Guayaquil, Ecuador
- Height: 1.83 m (6 ft 0 in)
- Position: Forward

Team information
- Current team: Mushuc Runa S.C.

Youth career
- 2009–2014: Rocafuerte
- 2013–2014: → Emelec (loan)

Senior career*
Years	Team	Apps	(Gls)
2013–2015	Rocafuerte	0	(0)
2014–2015	→ Emelec (loan)	7	(0)
2015–2019	Emelec	121	(57)
2019–2022	Cruz Azul	50	(8)
2020	→ Tijuana (loan)	21	(4)
2022	Santos	16	(2)
2023–2024	Emelec	0	(0)
2024	The Strongest	11	(2)

International career^{‡}
2015–	Ecuador	5	(0)
- * Club domestic league appearances and goals as of 14:27, 4 September 2024 (UTC) ‡ National team caps and goals as of 22:51, 26 January 2022 (UTC)

Bryan Dennis Angulo Tenorio (born 30 November 1995) is an Ecuadorian professional footballer who plays as a forward for Mushuc Runa.

== Club career ==
=== Early career ===
Angulo was born in Guayaquil, and joined Rocafuerte's youth setup in 2009. In July 2013, after already making his first team debut in Segunda Categoría del Guayas, he was loaned to Serie A side Emelec, for two years.

=== Emelec ===
On 11 October 2014, after being regularly used with the reserve side, Angulo made his first team debut, coming on as a late substitute for goalscorer Miller Bolaños in a 3–1 away win against Manta. On 5 February 2015, after featuring in seven league matches the previous campaign, he was bought outright by Emelec and agreed to a contract until 2019.

Angulo only became a starter for the club from the 2016 season onwards, and scored his first goal on 8 May of that year by netting the equalizer in a 3–3 home draw against River Ecuador. On 9 October, he scored a brace in a 3–1 home win against Fuerza Amarilla.

Angulo was the second topscorer of the 2018 campaign by netting 29 goals, eight behind Jhon Cifuente.

=== Cruz Azul ===
On 6 August 2019, Liga MX side Cruz Azul announced an agreement with Emelec for the transfer of Angulo. Three days later, he was officially announced as the new addition of the club.

==== Loan to Tijuana ====
On 26 December 2019, after just nine matches for Cruz Azul, Angulo moved to fellow league team Tijuana on loan. Despite featuring rarely, his loan was cut short in January 2021.

==== Return from loan ====
After returning to the Cementeros, Angulo scored his first goal for the club on 28 February 2021, netting the winner in a 1–0 away success over León. On 31 March 2022, he left the club after terminating his contract.

=== Santos ===
On 2 April 2022, Angulo switched teams and countries again after signing a contract with Brazilian club Santos until June 2023. He made his debut for the club seven days later, replacing Ricardo Goulart in a 0–0 away draw against Fluminense.

=== Emelec return ===
On 18 December 2022, Emelec announced the signing of Angulo on a two-year contract.

== International career ==
On 7 November 2018, Angulo was called up by Ecuador manager Hernán Darío Gómez for friendlies against Peru and Panama. He made his full international debut thirteen days later, starting in a 2–1 win against the latter in Panama City.

== Personal life ==
Angulo was accused of a murder that occurred in his hometown of Guayaquil during the early hours of 25 December 2020. The following day, his name was withdrawn from the investigation.

== Career statistics ==
=== Club ===
As of 15 March 2026.

Club	Division	League			Cup		Continental		Total	
Club	Division	Season	Apps	Goals	Apps	Goals	Apps	Goals	Apps	Goals
Rocafuerte	Segunda Categoría	2013	7	4	—		—		7	4
Emelec	Serie A	2014	7	0	—		—		7	0
Emelec	Serie A	2015	4	0	—		1	0	5	0
Emelec	Serie A	2016	26	10	—		4	0	30	10
Emelec	Serie A	2017	37	13	—		6	3	43	16
Emelec	Serie A	2018	41	29	—		4	2	45	31
Emelec	Serie A	2019	13	5	1	1	8	4	22	10
Cruz Azul	Liga MX	2019	9	0	0	0	0	0	9	0
Cruz Azul	Liga MX	2021	14	3	1	0	6	4	21	7
Cruz Azul	Liga MX	2021	20	5	0	0	0	0	20	5
Cruz Azul	Liga MX	2022	6	1	0	0	1	0	7	1
Cruz Azul	Total		49	8	1	0	7	4	57	13
Tijuana	Liga MX	2019-20	6	1	5	3	—		11	4
Tijuana	Liga MX	2020-21	15	3	1	0	—		16	3
Tijuana	Total		21	4	6	3	0	0	27	7
Santos	Série A	2022	16	2	2	0	6	3	24	5
Emelec	Serie A	2023	14	0	0	0	8	0	22	0
Emelec	Total		142	57	1	1	31	9	174	67
The Strongest	Bolivian Primera División	2024	11	2	—		3	1	14	3
Mushuc Runa	Serie A	2025	5	1	0	0	2	0	7	1
Liga de Portoviejo	Segunda Categoría	2025	0	0	0	0	0	0	0	0
Deportivo Moquegua	Liga 1	2026	6	0	0	0	0	0	6	0
Career total			257	79	10	4	49	17	316	100

=== International ===
As of 26 January 2022.

Ecuador national team
Year	Apps	Goals
2018	1	0
2021	4	0
Total	5	0

== Honours ==
Cruz Azul

- Liga MX: Guardianes 2021
- Campeón de Campeones: 2021
- Leagues Cup: 2019
