= Pol Fernández =

Argentine footballer (born 1991)

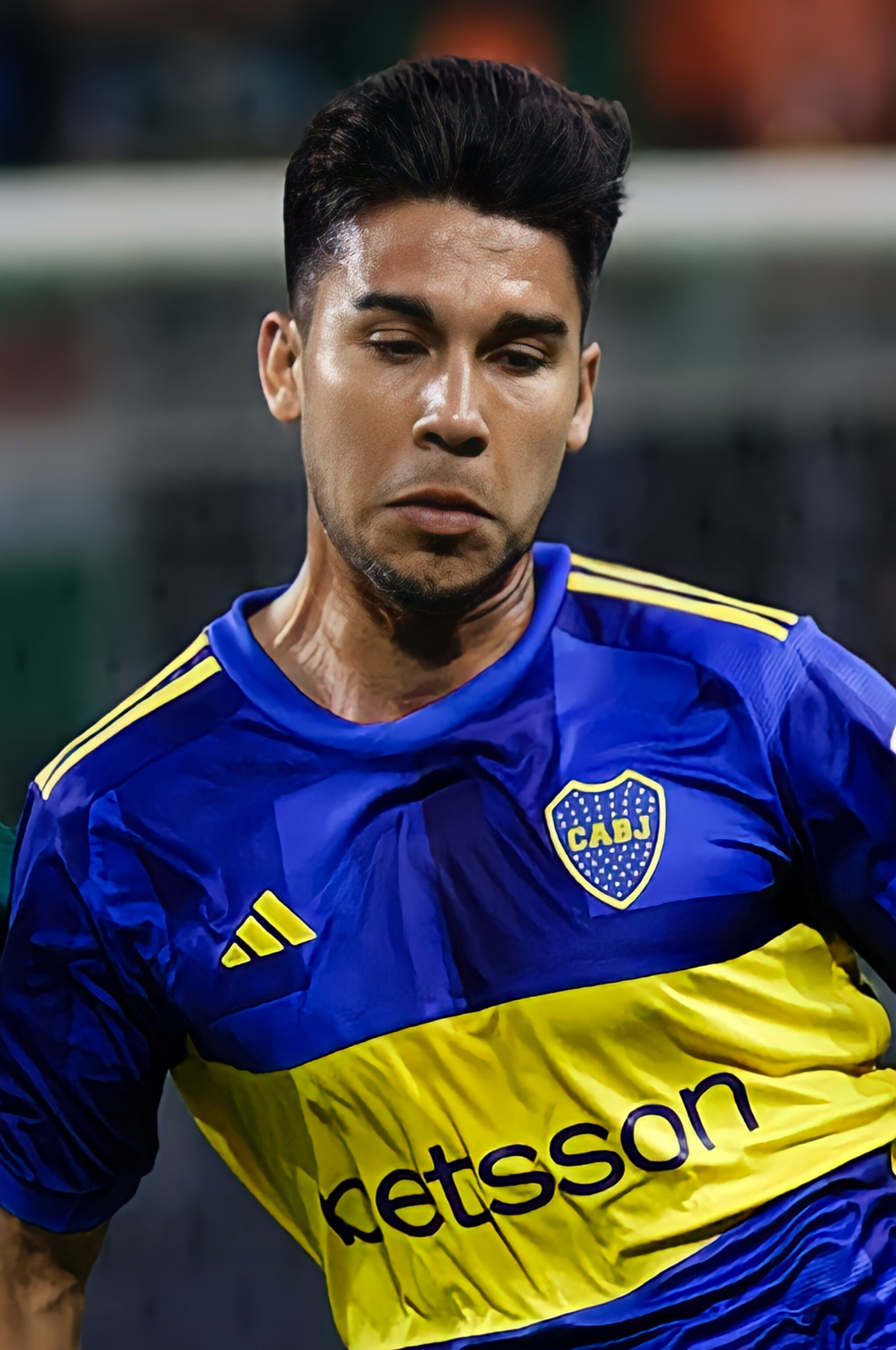
- Fernández in 2023

Personal information
- Full name: Guillermo Matías Fernández
- Date of birth: 11 October 1991 (age 35)
- Place of birth: Granadero Baigorria, Santa Fe, Argentina
- Height: 1.76 m (5 ft 9 in)
- Position: Midfielder

Team information
- Current team: Rosario Central
- Number: 28

Youth career
- Boca Juniors

Senior career*
Years	Team	Apps	(Gls)
2012–2015	Boca Juniors	43	(3)
2013	→ Rosario Central (loan)	5	(0)
2014	→ Atlético de Rafaela (loan)	21	(4)
2015–2018	Godoy Cruz	71	(7)
2018–2019	Racing Club	23	(3)
2019–2022	Cruz Azul	46	(3)
2020	→ Boca Juniors (loan)	8	(1)
2022–2024	Boca Juniors	101	(5)
2025	Fortaleza	19	(0)
2025–2026	Godoy Cruz	13	(0)
2026–	Rosario Central	11	(0)
- * Club domestic league appearances and goals as of 17:12, 10 July 2026 (UTC)

Guillermo Matías "Pol" Fernández (born 11 October 1991) is an Argentine professional footballer who plays as a midfielder for Rosario Central.

== Honours ==
Boca Juniors

- Primera División: 2019–20, 2022
- Copa Argentina: 2011–12
- Copa de la Liga Profesional: 2020, 2022
- Supercopa Argentina: 2022

Racing Club

- Primera División: 2018–19

Cruz Azul

- Liga MX: Guardianes 2021
- Campeón de Campeones: 2021
- Supercopa MX: 2019
- Leagues Cup: 2019
