= Walter Montoya =

Argentine footballer (born 1993)

Personal information
- Full name: Walter Iván Alexis Montoya
- Date of birth: 21 July 1993 (age 33)
- Place of birth: Machagai, Argentina
- Height: 1.72 m (5 ft 8 in)
- Positions: Right winger; midfielder

Team information
- Current team: Gimnasia y Tiro

Youth career
- Unión Machagai
- 2006–2010: Jorge Griffa
- 2010–2014: Rosario Central

Senior career*
Years	Team	Apps	(Gls)
2014–2017	Rosario Central	46	(3)
2017	Sevilla	5	(0)
2018–2021	Cruz Azul	49	(1)
2019	→ Grêmio (loan)	11	(2)
2019–2020	→ Racing Club (loan)	27	(0)
2022–2023	Rosario Central	37	(1)
2024	Central Córdoba SdE	15	(0)
2024–2025	Defensor Sporting	34	(7)
2025–2026	Godoy Cruz	6	(0)
2026–	Gimnasia y Tiro	10	(0)
- * Club domestic league appearances and goals as of 18:07, 28 April 2026 (UTC)

Walter Iván Alexis Montoya (born 21 July 1993) is an Argentine professional footballer who plays as a right winger or midfielder for Gimnasia y Tiro.

== Club career ==
=== Rosario Central ===
Born in Machagai, Montoya joined Rosario Central's youth categories in 2010, after spells at AA Jorge Bernardo Griffa and CSyD Unión Machagai. After progressing through the club's youth setup, he made his first team debut on 4 September 2014 by coming on as a late substitute for Fernando Barrientos in a 1–1 Copa Sudamericana home draw against Boca Juniors.

Montoya made his Primera División debut on 12 October 2014, starting in a 2–1 away loss against the same opponent. He scored his first professional goal the following 23 August, netting the first in a 3–1 home win against Belgrano.

On 12 May 2016, Montoya scored the game's only in a home success over Atlético Nacional, for the year's Copa Libertadores.

=== Sevilla ===
On 27 January 2017, Montoya signed a four-and-a-half-year contract with La Liga club Sevilla FC. He made his debut for the club on 2 March, replacing Luciano Vietto in a 1–0 home win against Athletic Bilbao.

=== Cruz Azul ===
On 27 December 2017, Montoya was signed from Spanish side Sevilla FC to Mexican club Cruz Azul. Walter Montoya was announced to be the new player of Grêmio of the Brazilian Série A.

== Honours ==
Grêmio

- Recopa Gaúcha: 2019
- Campeonato Gaúcho: 2019

Cruz Azul

- Liga MX: Guardianes 2021
- Copa MX: Apertura 2018
- Campeón de Campeones: 2021

Rosario Central

• Copa de la Liga Profesional: 2023

Individual

- CONCACAF Champions League Team of the Tournament: 2021
