= Juan Marcelo Escobar =

Paraguayan footballer (born 1995)

Juan Escobar
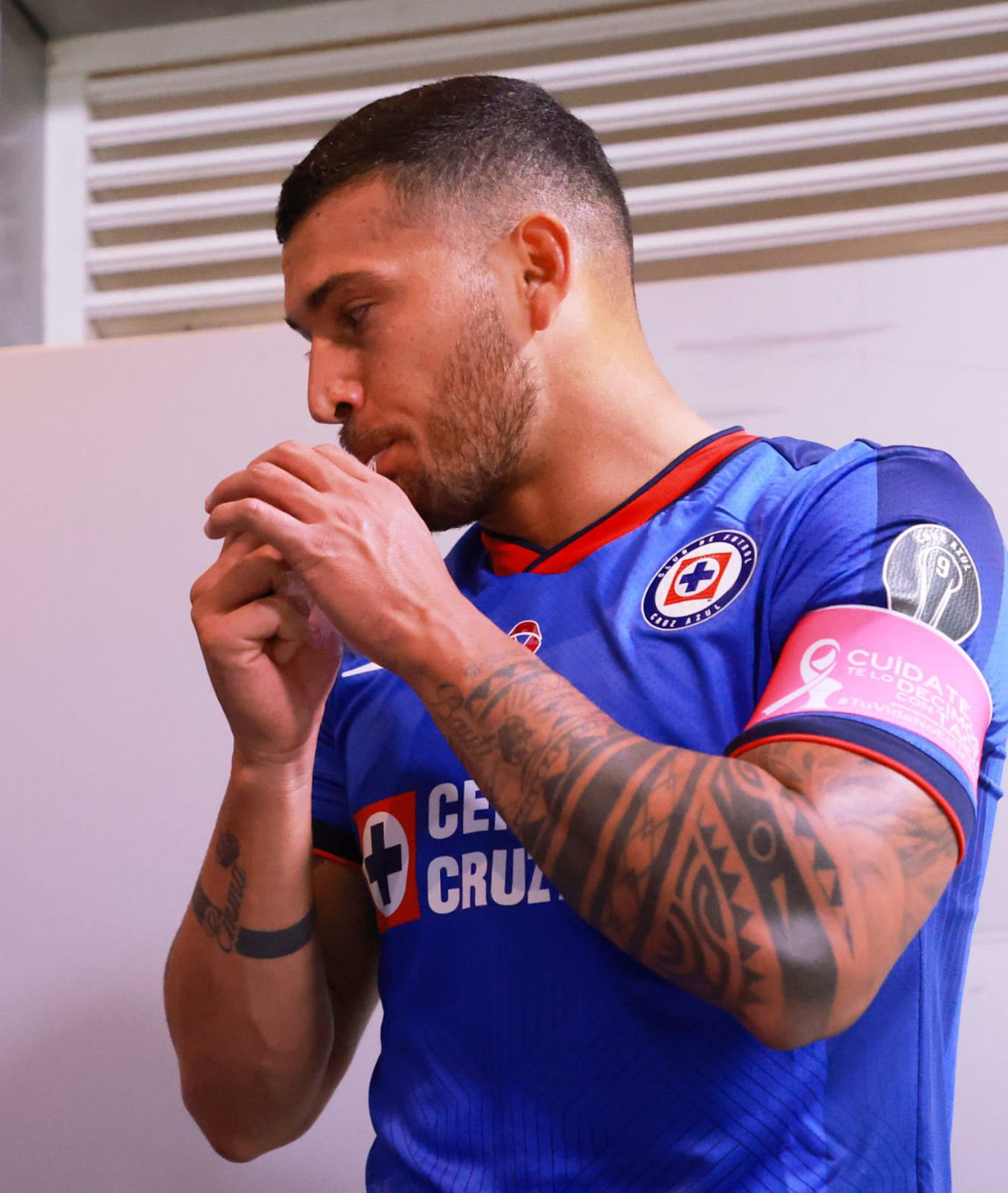
- Escobar with Cruz Azul in 2023

Personal information
- Full name: Juan Marcelo Escobar Chena
- Date of birth: 3 July 1995 (age 31)
- Place of birth: Luque, Paraguay
- Height: 1.77 m (5 ft 10 in)
- Position: Right-back

Team information
- Current team: Melgar

Youth career
- 2010–2013: Sportivo Luqueño

Senior career*
Years	Team	Apps	(Gls)
2014–2017	Sportivo Luqueño	97	(1)
2018–2019	Cerro Porteño	54	(4)
2019–2024	Cruz Azul	142	(11)
2024	→ Toluca (loan)	14	(0)
2025	Castellón	9	(0)
2025–2026	Godoy Cruz	10	(0)
2026–	Melgar	0	(0)

International career^{‡}
2015	Paraguay U20	4	(0)
2015	Paraguay U23	4	(0)
2017–2022	Paraguay	12	(0)
- * Club domestic league appearances and goals as of 17:12, 8 March 2026 (UTC) ‡ National team caps and goals as of 29 January 2022

Juan Marcelo Escobar Chena (Spanish pronunciation: [xwam maɾˈselo eskoˈβaɾ ˈtʃena]; born 3 July 1995) is a Paraguayan professional footballer who plays as either a centre-back or right-back for Liga 1 club Melgar.

He has also been part of Paraguay's U20 and U23 teams.

== Club career ==
=== Sportivo Luqueño ===
Born in Luque, Escobar started his career with hometown side Sportivo Luqueño. Promoted to the first team ahead of the 2014 season, he made his first team – and Primera División – debut on 16 February of that year, starting in a 3–0 away loss against Nacional Asunción.

Escobar subsequently became a regular starter for the side, and scored his first professional goal on 4 May 2016, netting his team's second in a 2–2 home draw against Sol de América.

=== Cerro Porteño ===
On 28 December 2017, Escobar agreed to a five-year contract with Cerro Porteño, for a rumoured fee of US$ 1 million. He was a regular starter during his first campaign, playing as a central defender and partnering Marcos Cáceres.

=== Cruz Azul ===
In 2019, he joined Mexican club Cruz Azul for a fee of USD7 million, surpassing a 20-year transfer fee record in Paraguayan football held by Roque Santa Cruz when he joined Bundesliga team Bayern Munich for USD6.9 million in 1999.

==== Loan to Toluca ====
On 31 January 2024, Escobar joined Toluca on a season-long loan.

=== Castellón ===
On 11 February 2025, Castellón announced the signing of Escobar.

=== Godoy Cruz ===
On 25 July 2025, Escobar joined Argentine Primera División club Godoy Cruz.

== International career ==
After representing Paraguay at under-20 level in the 2015 South American Youth Football Championship, and under-23 level in the 2015 Pan American Games, Escobar was first called up to the full side on 21 June 2017, for a friendly against Mexico. He made his full international debut on 1 July, starting in a 2–1 loss at the CenturyLink Field in Seattle.

== Career statistics ==
=== Club ===
As of 14 January 2019

Club	Season	League			Cup		Continental		Other		Total	
Club	Season	Division	Apps	Goals	Apps	Goals	Apps	Goals	Apps	Goals	Apps	Goals
Sportivo Luqueño	2014	Primera División	21	0	—		—		—		21	0
Sportivo Luqueño	2015	Primera División	10	0	—		2 (Note: Appearance(s) in Copa Sudamericana)	0	—		12	0
Sportivo Luqueño	2016	Primera División	25	1	—		1	0	—		26	1
Sportivo Luqueño	2017	Primera División	41	0	—		2	1	—		43	1
Sportivo Luqueño	Total		97	1	—		5	1	—		102	2
Cerro Porteño	2018	Primera División	34	0	—		6 (Note: Appearance(s) in Copa Libertadores)	0	—		40	0
Career total			131	1	0	0	11	1	0	0	142	2

=== International ===
As of 29 January 2022

Paraguay
Year	Apps	Goals
2017	1	0
2019	5	0
2021	5	0
2022	1	0
Total	12	0

== Honours ==
Cruz Azul

- Liga MX: Guardianes 2021
- Campeón de Campeones: 2021
- Supercopa de la Liga MX: 2022
- Supercopa MX: 2019
- Leagues Cup: 2019

Individual

- Liga MX All-Star: 2021, 2022
- Liga MX Goal of the Tournament: 2021–22

== See also ==
- List of outfield association footballers who played in goal
- Players and Records in Paraguayan Football
