= Josué Reyes =

Mexican footballer (born 1997)

Personal information
- Full name: Josué Emmanuel Reyes Santacruz
- Date of birth: 10 December 1997 (age 28)
- Place of birth: Ciudad Obregón, Sonora, Mexico
- Height: 1.82 m (6 ft 0 in)
- Position: Centre-back

Team information
- Current team: Alebrijes de Oaxaca
- Number: 12

Youth career
- 2015–2016: Generales de Navojoa
- 2017: Obregón
- 2017–2019: Cruz Azul

Senior career*
Years	Team	Apps	(Gls)
2017–2021	Cruz Azul	12	(0)
2018-2021	→ Cruz Azul Hidalgo	26	(3)
2022–2024	Sonora	72	(0)
2024–2026	Sinaloa	41	(0)
2025	→ Tijuana (loan)	1	(0)
2026–	Oaxaca	9	(0)
- * Club domestic league appearances and goals as of 22 September 2026

Josué Emmanuel Reyes Santacruz (born 10 December 1997) is a Mexican professional footballer who plays as a centre-back for Liga de Expansión MX club Oaxaca.

== Career statistics ==
=== Club ===
As of 15 May 2022

Club	Season	League			Cup		Continental		Other		Total	
Club	Season	Division	Apps	Goals	Apps	Goals	Apps	Goals	Apps	Goals	Apps	Goals
Cruz Azul	2019–20	Liga MX	1	0	–		1 (Note: Appearances in CONCACAF Champions League)	0	–		2	0
Cruz Azul	2020–21	Liga MX	9	0	–		2	1	–		11	1
Cruz Azul	2021–22	Liga MX	2	0	–		–		–		2	0
Cruz Azul	Total		12	0	–		3	1	–		15	1
Sonora	2021–22	Liga de Expansión MX	21	0	–		–		–		21	0
Sonora	2022–23	Liga de Expansión MX	27	0	–						27	0
Sonora	2023–24	Liga de Expansión MX	24	0	–						24	0
Sonora	Total		72	0	–						72	0
Career total			84	0	–		3	1	–		36	1

== Honours ==
Cruz Azul

- Liga MX: Guardianes 2021
- Leagues Cup: 2019
- Campeón de Campeones: 2021
