= Apertura 2018 Copa MX final =

- Event: Apertura 2018 Copa MX
Monterrey	Cruz Azul
0	2
- Date: 31 October 2018
- Venue: Estadio BBVA Bancomer, Guadalupe, Nuevo León
- Referee: Fernando Guerrero
- Attendance: 49,764
- Weather: Mostly Cloudy; 72 °F (22 °C); 88% humidity

The Apertura 2018 Copa MX final was the final of the Apertura 2018 Copa MX, the thirteenth edition of the Copa MX under its current format and 80th overall organized by the Mexican Football Federation, the governing body of association football in Mexico.

The final was contested in a single leg format between Liga MX clubs Monterrey and Cruz Azul. The match was hosted by Monterrey at Estadio BBVA Bancomer in the Monterrey suburb of Guadalupe on 31 October 2018. The winners earned a spot to face the winners of the Clausura 2019 in the 2019 Supercopa MX.

== Qualified teams ==
Team	Previous finals appearances (bold indicates winners)
Monterrey	4 (1964, 1969, **1992**, **Apertura 2017**)
Cruz Azul	5 (**1969**, 1974, 1988, **1997**, **Clausura 2013**)

== Venue ==
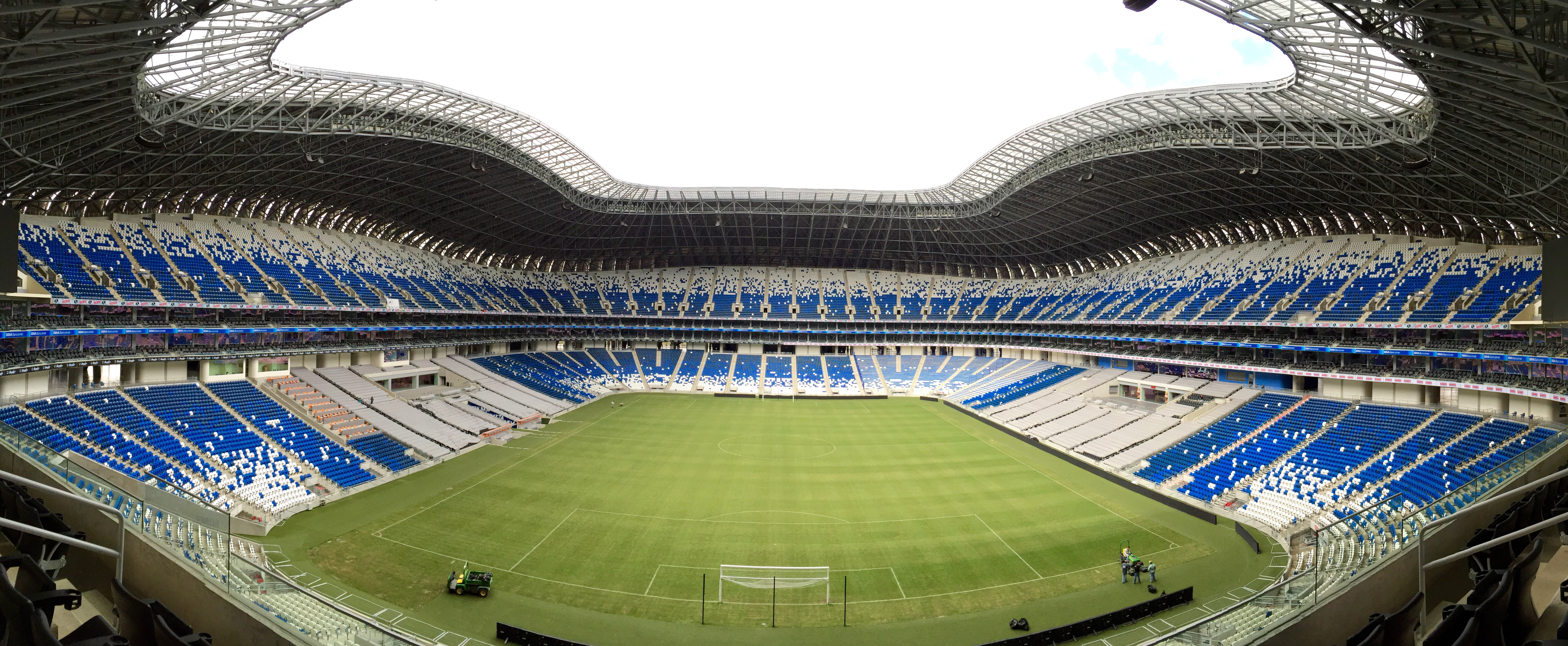
Estadio BBVA Bancomer hosted the final

Due to the tournament's regulations, the higher seed among both finalists during the group stage will host the final, thus Estadio BBVA Bancomer hosted the final. The venue which opened on 2 August 2015 is the newest venue in Liga MX and has been home to Monterrey since the Apertura 2015 season. The venue has previously hosted two Liga MX finals (Clausura 2016 and Apertura 2017) and one Copa MX final (Apertura 2017).

== Background ==
Monterrey has won the tournament twice while Cruz Azul has won it three times. Before reaching this final, the last time Monterrey reached a reached a final of any kind was the previous December when they defeated Pachuca 1–0 to capture the Apertura 2017 Copa MX. Cruz Azul last reached a final back in 2014 where they defeated Toluca 1–1 (on away goals) in the 2013–14 CONCACAF Champions League final.

These two clubs last faced each other in a final back in 2009 when Monterrey won 6–4 on aggregate to capture the Apertura 2009 league title. The clubs also faced each other in the 1969 Copa México Final where Cruz Azul came out victorious.

Monterrey won three, drew once, lost none and scored nine goals during group stage, as they were seeded third. They eliminated Zacatepec in the Round of 16, Querétaro in the quarterfinals, and Pachuca in the semifinals.

Cruz Azul won two, drew one, lost one and scored seven goals during group stage, as they were seeded ninth. They defeated Tijuana in the Round of 16, Juárez in the quarterfinals, and León on penalty kicks in the semifinals.

== Road to the finals ==
Note: In all results below, the score of the finalist is given first.

Monterrey		Round	Cruz Azul	
Opponent	Result	Group stage	Opponent	Result
Puebla	2–1 (H)	Matchday 1	Zacatepec	3–2 (A)
Venados	3–0 (A)	Matchday 2	Atlas	2–2 (H)
Puebla	1–1 (A)	Matchday 3	Zacatepec	2–0 (H)
Venados	3–2 (H)	Matchday 4	Atlas	0–1 (A)
**Group 1 winners**: Pos / Team / Pld / Pts; **1** / Monterrey / **4** / **10**; 2 / Puebla / 4 / **7**; 3 / Venados / 4 / **0**; Source: Copa MX		Final standings	**Group 6 winners**: Pos / Team / Pld / Pts; **1** / Cruz Azul / **4** / **7**; 2 / Zacatepec / 4 / **6**; 3 / Atlas / 4 / **4**; Source: Copa MX	
Opponent	Result	Knockout stage	Opponent	Result
Zacatepec	4–2 (H)	Round of 16	Tijuana	2–1 (A)
Querétaro	1–0 (H)	Quarterfinals	Juárez	2–0 (H)
Pachuca	3–3 (4–3 pen.) (H)	Semifinals	León	1–1 (5–4 pen.) (H)

== Match ==
31 October 2018

Monterrey	0–2	Cruz Azul
	Report	Hernández 34'; Cauteruccio 53'

Estadio BBVA Bancomer, Guadalupe
Attendance: 49,764
Referee: Fernando Guerrero

**Monterrey**	**Cruz Azul**

GK	22	(Argentina) Juan Pablo Carrizo
DF	17	(Mexico) Jesús Gallardo
DF	23	(Mexico) Johan Vásquez	(yellow card) 56'	(substituted off) 56'
DF	15	(Argentina) José María Basanta (c)		(substituted off) 65'
DF	21	(Mexico) Jesús Molina
DF	288	(Mexico) Eric Cantú
MF	16	(Paraguay) Celso Ortiz	(yellow card) 48'
MF	29	(Mexico) Carlos Rodríguez
FW	286	(Mexico) Daniel Lajud		(substituted off) 57'
FW	7	(Argentina) Rogelio Funes Mori
FW	8	(Colombia) Dorlan Pabón
Substitutions:
GK	1	(Argentina) Marcelo Barovero
DF	6	(Mexico) Edson Gutiérrez
DF	11	(Argentina) Leonel Vangioni
MF	284	(Mexico) Axel Grijalva		(substituted on) 65'
FW	18	(Colombia) Avilés Hurtado		(substituted on) 56'
FW	19	(Mexico) Luis Madrigal
FW	20	(Mexico) Rodolfo Pizarro		(substituted on) 57'
Manager:
(Uruguay) Diego Alonso

GK	12	(Mexico) Guillermo Allison
DF	16	(Mexico) Adrián Aldrete
DF	2	(Paraguay) Pablo Aguilar
DF	5	(Chile) Igor Lichnovsky	(yellow card) 19'
DF	4	(Mexico) Julio César Domínguez (c)
MF	23	(Argentina) Iván Marcone
MF	8	(Mexico) Javier Salas
MF	14	(Mexico) Misael Domínguez		(substituted off) 79'
MF	25	(Mexico) Roberto Alvarado
MF	11	(Mexico) Elías Hernández		(substituted off) 66'
FW	9	(Argentina) Milton Caraglio		(substituted off) 46'
Substitutions:
GK	1	(Mexico) José de Jesús Corona
DF	19	(Mexico) Antonio Sánchez		(substituted on) 79'
DF	27	(Mexico) José Madueña
DF	342	(Mexico) Jorge Luis García
MF	17	(Spain) Édgar Méndez		(substituted on) 66'
MF	22	(Mexico) Rafael Baca
FW	7	(Uruguay) Martín Cauteruccio		(substituted on) 46'
Manager:
(Portugal) Hélder Baptista (Note: Cruz Azul manager Pedro Caixinha was suspended three matches after an altercation with the officials during the Round of 16 match against Tijuana.)

Assistant referees:
Marcos Quintero
Israel Valenciano
Fourth official:
Alejandro Funk

== Broadcasters ==
Country	Free	Pay	Ref
Mexico	Azteca 7 Canal 5	ESPN 2 Fox Sports 2 Izzi; TDN; UnivisionTDN	
United States		Fox Deportes	
