= 2019–20 Cruz Azul season =

Cruz Azul
2019–20 season
- President: Guillermo Álvarez Cuevas
- Manager: Pedro Caixinha (until 2 September); Robert Siboldi (from 6 September)
- Stadium: Estadio Azteca
- Liga MX: Apertura: 12th (Did not qualify); Clausura: 1st (Cancelled)
- Champions League: Quarter-finals
- Supercopa MX: Winners
- Leagues Cup: Winners
- Top goalscorer: League: Pablo Aguilar; Milton Caraglio; Jonathan Rodríguez (2 goals); All: Milton Caraglio; Elías Hernández (3 goals)
- Highest home attendance: 25,320 vs Toluca (27 July 2019)
- Lowest home attendance: 11,867 vs Puebla (24 August 2019)
- Average home league attendance: Apertura: 18,337
- Biggest win: Cruz Azul 4–0 Necaxa (14 July 2019)
- Biggest defeat: Querétaro 3–0 Cruz Azul (3 August 2019)
Home colours	Away colours
- All statistics correct as of 4 August 2019.

The 2019–20 Cruz Azul Fútbol Club season was the 93rd season in the football club's history and the 55th consecutive season in the top flight of Mexican football. Cruz Azul competed in Liga MX, Supercopa MX, Leagues Cup, and the CONCACAF Champions League.

== Coaching staff ==
Position	Name
Head coach	(Portugal) Pedro Caixinha
Assistant coaches	(Portugal) Hélder Baptista
Assistant coaches	(Mexico) Joaquín Moreno
Assistant coaches	(Spain) José Belman
Assistant coaches	(Portugal) Oscar Farias
Doctors	(Mexico) Ernesto Prado
Doctors	(Mexico) Odín Vite
Kinesiologist	(Mexico) Juan Rubio

== Players ==
=== Squad information ===
No.	Pos.	Nat.	Name	Date of birth (age)	Signed in	Previous club
Goalkeepers
1	GK	(Mexico)	José de Jesús Corona (Captain)	26 January 1981 (aged 38)	2009	(Mexico) UAG
1	GK	(Mexico)	Óscar Pérez	1 February 1973 (aged 46)	2019	(Mexico) Pachuca
12	GK	(Mexico)	Guillermo Allison	28 September 1990 (aged 28)	2013	(Mexico) Youth system
30	GK	(Mexico)	Andrés Gudiño	27 January 1997 (aged 22)	2019	(Mexico) Cruz Azul Hidalgo
Defenders
2	DF	(Mexico)	Josué Reyes	10 December 1997 (aged 21)	2019 (Winter)	(Mexico) Cruz Azul Hidalgo
3	DF	(Mexico)	Jaiber Jiménez	7 January 1995 (aged 24)	2019	(Mexico) Cruz Azul Hidalgo
4	DF	(Mexico)	Julio César Domínguez (VC)	8 November 1987 (aged 31)	2006	(Mexico) Youth system
5	DF	(Chile)	Igor Lichnovsky	7 March 1994 (aged 25)	2018	(Mexico) Necaxa
16	DF	(Mexico)	Adrián Aldrete	14 June 1988 (aged 31)	2016	(Mexico) Santos Laguna
23	DF	(Paraguay)	Pablo Aguilar	2 April 1987 (aged 32)	2018	(Mexico) Tijuana
24	DF	(Paraguay)	Juan Escobar	3 July 1995 (aged 24)	2019	(Paraguay) Cerro Porteño
26	DF	(Mexico)	Jorge Luis García	22 January 2002 (aged 17)	2019 (Winter)	(Mexico) Youth system
27	DF	(Mexico)	José Madueña	29 May 1990 (aged 29)	2018 (Winter)	(Mexico) Atlas
Midfielders
6	MF	(Canada)	Stephen Eustáquio	21 December 1996 (aged 22)	2019 (Winter)	(Portugal) Chaves
8	MF	(Mexico)	Javier Salas	20 August 1993 (aged 25)	2018 (Winter)	(Mexico) Atlas
10	MF	(Argentina)	Guillermo Fernández	11 October 1991 (aged 27)	2019	(Argentina) Racing Club
11	MF	(Mexico)	Elías Hernández	29 April 1988 (aged 31)	2018	(Mexico) León
14	MF	(Mexico)	Misael Domínguez	27 October 1999 (aged 19)	2018	(Mexico) Monterrey
17	MF	(Spain)	Édgar Méndez	2 January 1990 (aged 29)	2017	(Spain) Alavés
19	MF	(Peru)	Yoshimar Yotún	7 April 1990 (aged 29)	2019 (Winter)	(United States) Orlando City
20	MF	(Mexico)	Alexis Gutiérrez	26 February 2000 (aged 19)	2019	(Mexico) Guadalajara
22	MF	(Mexico)	Rafael Baca	11 September 1989 (aged 29)	2014 (Winter)	(United States) San Jose Earthquakes
25	MF	(Mexico)	Roberto Alvarado	7 September 1998 (aged 20)	2018	(Mexico) Necaxa
31	MF	(Mexico)	Orbelín Pineda	24 March 1996 (aged 23)	2019 (Winter)	(Mexico) Guadalajara
Forwards
7	FW	(Uruguay)	Martín Cauteruccio	14 April 1987 (aged 32)	2017 (Winter)	(Argentina) San Lorenzo
9	FW	(Argentina)	Milton Caraglio	1 December 1988 (aged 30)	2018	(Mexico) Atlas
21	FW	(Uruguay)	Jonathan Rodríguez	6 July 1993 (aged 26)	2019 (Winter)	(Mexico) Santos Laguna
29	FW	(Mexico)	Santiago Giménez	18 April 2001 (aged 18)	2018	(Mexico) Youth system

Players and squad numbers last updated on 23 July 2019.
Note: Flags indicate national team as has been defined under FIFA eligibility rules. Players may hold more than one non-FIFA nationality.

== Transfers ==
=== In ===
N	Pos.	Nat.	Name	Age	Moving from	Type	Transfer window	Source
1	GK	(Mexico)	Óscar Pérez	1 February 1973 (aged 46)	(Mexico) Pachuca	Transfer	Summer	
10	MF	(Argentina)	Guillermo Fernández	11 October 1991 (aged 27)	(Argentina) Racing Club	Transfer	Summer	
24	DF	(Paraguay)	Juan Escobar	3 July 1995 (aged 24)	(Paraguay) Cerro Porteño	Transfer	Summer	

== Competitions ==
=== Overview ===
Competition	First match	Last match	Starting round	Final position	Record							
Competition	First match	Last match	Starting round	Final position	Pld	W	D	L	GF	GA	GD	Win %
Supercopa MX	14 July 2019		Final	Winners	1	1	0	0	4	0	+4	100.00
Torneo Apertura	20 July 2019	23 November 2019	Matchday 1	12th	18	5	8	5	25	24	+1	27.78
Leagues Cup	23 July 2019	18 September 2019	Quarter-finals	Winners	3	3	0	0	6	2	+4	100.00
Champions League	18 February 2020	16 December 2020	Round of 16	Quarter-finals	3	2	0	1	7	3	+4	66.67
Torneo Clausura	11 January 2020	15 March 2020	Matchday 1	1st	10	7	1	2	24	14	+10	70.00
Total					35	18	9	8	66	43	+23	51.43

Last updated: 16 December 2020
Source: Mediotiempo.com

=== Supercopa MX ===
14 July 2019	Cruz Azul	4–0	Necaxa	Carson, California, United States
	Caraglio 19'; Hernández 43'; Méndez 46'; Escobar 86'	Report		Stadium: Dignity Health Sports Park; Attendance: 27,800; Referee: Diego Montaño

=== Torneo Apertura ===
==== League table ====
Pos	Team	Pld	W	D	L	GF	GA	GD	Pts
10	Guadalajara	18	7	4	7	28	28	0	25
11	Tijuana	18	7	3	8	26	36	−10	24
12	Cruz Azul	18	5	8	5	25	24	+1	23
13	UNAM	18	6	5	7	21	20	+1	23
14	Atlas	18	6	3	9	19	26	−7	21

Source: Liga MX
Rules for classification: 1) Points; 2) Goal difference; 3) Number of goals scored; 4) Head-to-head results between tied teams; 5) Number of goals scored away; 6) Highest relegation coefficient; 7) Fair Play points

==== Results summary ====
Overall								Home						Away					
Pld	W	D	L	GF	GA	GD	Pts	W	D	L	GF	GA	GD	W	D	L	GF	GA	GD
18	5	8	5	25	24	+1	23	4	4	1	17	10	+7	1	4	4	8	14	−6

Last updated: 24 November 2019.
Source: LigaMX

==== Result round by round ====
Round	1	2	3	4	5	6	7	8	9	10	11	12	13	14	15	16	17	18	19
Ground	A	H	A	H	A	H	A	H	A	A	H	A	H	H	A	H	—	A	H
Result	D	D	L	W	W	D	L	D	D	D	D	L	W	L	D	W	—	L	W
Position	9	11	15	10	8	8	10	11	13	13	14	14	12	14	12	11	13	14	12

Updated to match(es) played on 24 November 2019. Source: Mediotiempo.com
A = Away; H = Home; W = Win; D = Draw; L = Loss

==== Matches ====
20 July 2019 1	Necaxa	0–0	Cruz Azul	Aguascalientes City
21:08		Report		Stadium: Estadio Victoria; Attendance: 19,361; Referee: Jorge Antonio Pérez Durán

27 July 2019 2	Cruz Azul	1–1	Toluca	Mexico City
21:00	Rodríguez 47'	Report	Medina 90+1'	Stadium: Estadio Azteca; Attendance: 25,320; Referee: Diego Montaño

3 August 2019 3	Querétaro	3–0	Cruz Azul	Querétaro City
21:00	Romo 17', 71'; Pereira 73'	Report		Stadium: Estadio Corregidora; Attendance: 29,329; Referee: Oscar Mejía

10 August 2019 4	Cruz Azul	2–0	Juarez	Mexico City
				Stadium: Estadio Azteca

16 August 2019 5	Atlas	1–3	Cruz Azul	Guadalajara
				Stadium: Estadio Jalisco

24 August 2019 6	Cruz Azul	1–1	Puebla	Mexico City
				Stadium: Estadio Azteca

28 August 2019 7	Tijuana	3–2	Cruz Azul	Tijuana
				Stadium: Estadio Caliente

31 August 2019 8	Cruz Azul	1–1	Guadalajara	Mexico City
				Stadium: Estadio Azteca

13 September 2019 9	Veracruz	0–0	Cruz Azul	Veracruz
				Stadium: Estadio Luis Pirata Fuente

22 September 2019 10	Pumas	1–1	Cruz Azul	Mexico City
				Stadium: Estadio Olimpico Universitario

25 September 2019 11	Cruz Azul	1–1	Monterrey	Mexico City
				Stadium: Estadio Azteca

28 September 2019 12	Pachuca	2–0	Cruz Azul	Pachuca
				Stadium: Estadio Hidalgo

5 October 2019 13	Cruz Azul	5–2	America	Mexico City
				Stadium: Estadio Azteca

19 October 2019 14	Cruz Azul	2–3	Morelia	Mexico City
				Stadium: Estadio Azteca

26 October 2019 15	Tigres	1–1	Cruz Azul	San Nicolas
				Stadium: Estadio Universitario

31 October 2019 16	Cruz Azul	1–0	Leon	Mexico City
				Stadium: Estadio Azteca

10 November 2019 18	Santos	3–1	Cruz Azul	Torreon
				Stadium: Estadio Corona

23 November 2019 19	Cruz Azul	3–1	San Luis	Mexico City
				Stadium: Estadio Azteca

=== CONCACAF Champions League ===
==== Round of 16 ====
18 February 2020 First leg	Portmore United (Jamaica)	1–2	(Mexico) Cruz Azul	Kingston, Jamaica
20:00	R. Smith 74'	Report	Passerini 90+6'; Rodríguez 90+9'	Stadium: Independence Park; Referee: Reon Radix (Grenada)

25 February 2020 Second leg	Cruz Azul (Mexico)	4–0	(Jamaica) Portmore United	Mexico City
20:00	Pineda 22'; Passerini 59'; Ceppelini 76' (pen.); Borja 90'	Report		Stadium: Estadio Azteca; Referee: Drew Fischer (Canada)

==== Quarter-finals ====
16 December 2020	Los Angeles FC (United States)	2–1	(Mexico) Cruz Azul	Orlando (Note: This series was originally scheduled as a two-leg match to take place at Banc of California Stadium in Los Angeles, California on March 12 and Estadio Azteca in Mexico City on March 18.)
22:30 (21:30 UTC−6)	Vela 38' (pen.); Opoku 71'	Report	Yotún 15' (pen.), (yellow card) 83'; Aguilar (yellow card) 41'	Stadium: Exploria Stadium; Referee: Saíd Martínez (Honduras)

=== Leagues Cup ===
23 July 2019 Quarter-finals	Chicago Fire (United States)	0–2	(Mexico) Cruz Azul	Bridgeview, Illinois, United States
19:30		Report	Alvardo 43'; Hernández 90'	Stadium: SeatGeek Stadium; Attendance: 14,213; Referee: Oshane Nation (Jamaica)

20 August 2019 Semi-finals	LA Galaxy (United States)	1–2	(Mexico) Cruz Azul	Carson, California, United States
20:30	Cuello 37'		Madueña 4'; Pineda 47'	Stadium: Dignity Health Sports Park; Attendance: 20,135; Referee: Mario Escobar (Guatemala)

18 September 2019 Final	Cruz Azul (Mexico)	2–1	(Mexico) UANL	Las Vegas, United States
21:30	Yotún 73' (pen.); Rodríguez 75'	Report	Pizarro 90'	Stadium: Sam Boyd Stadium; Attendance: 20,132; Referee: Marco Antonio Ortiz (México)

=== Torneo Clausura ===
==== League table ====
Pos	Team	Pld	W	D	L	GF	GA	GD	Pts	Qualification
1	Cruz Azul	10	7	1	2	24	14	+10	22	Qualification to 2021 CONCACAF Champions League
2	León	10	7	0	3	23	14	+9	21	Qualification to 2021 CONCACAF Champions League
3	Santos Laguna	10	5	2	3	14	14	0	17	
4	América	10	5	2	3	11	11	0	17	
5	Guadalajara	10	4	4	2	13	11	+2	16	

Source: Liga MX
Rules for classification: 1) Points; 2) Goal difference; 3) Number of goals scored; 4) Head-to-head results between tied teams; 5) Number of goals scored away; 6) Highest relegation coefficient; 7) Fair Play points

==== Results summary ====
Overall								Home						Away					
Pld	W	D	L	GF	GA	GD	Pts	W	D	L	GF	GA	GD	W	D	L	GF	GA	GD
10	7	1	2	24	14	+10	22	4	0	1	13	6	+7	3	1	1	11	8	+3

Last updated: 15 March 2020.
Source: LigaMX

==== Result round by round ====
Round	1	2	3	4	5	6	7	8	9	10	11	12	13	14	15	16	17
Ground	H	A	H	A	H	A	H	A	H	A	—	—	—	—	—	—	—
Result	L	L	W	D	W	W	W	W	W	W	—	—	—	—	—	—	—
Position	5	18	12	11	7	6	4	1	1	1	—	—	—	—	—	—	—

Updated to match(es) played on 15 March 2020. Source: Mediotiempo.com
A = Away; H = Home; W = Win; D = Draw; L = Loss

== Statistics ==
=== Squad statistics ===
No.	Pos	Nat	Player	Total		Supercopa MX		Apertura		Leagues Cup		Copa MX		Clausura	
No.	Pos	Nat	Player	Apps	Goals	Apps	Goals	Apps	Goals	Apps	Goals	Apps	Goals	Apps	Goals
1	GK	(Mexico)	José de Jesús Corona	5	0	1	0	3	0	1	0	0	0	0	0
1	GK	(Mexico)	Óscar Pérez	1	0	0	0	1	0	0	0	0	0	0	0
4	DF	(Mexico)	Julio César Domínguez	4	0	1	0	2	0	1	0	0	0	0	0
5	DF	(Chile)	Igor Lichnovsky	5	0	1	0	3	0	1	0	0	0	0	0
9	FW	(Argentina)	Milton Caraglio	5	1	1	1	3	0	1	0	0	0	0	0
10	MF	(Argentina)	Guillermo Fernández	3	0	0	0	3	0	0	0	0	0	0	0
11	MF	(Mexico)	Elías Hernández	5	2	1	1	3	0	1	1	0	0	0	0
16	DF	(Mexico)	Adrián Aldrete	4	0	1	0	3	0	0	0	0	0	0	0
17	MF	(Spain)	Édgar Méndez	5	1	1	1	3	0	1	0	0	0	0	0
19	MF	(Peru)	Yoshimar Yotún	5	0	1	0	3	0	1	0	0	0	0	0
21	FW	(Uruguay)	Jonathan Rodríguez	4	1	0	0	3	1	1	0	0	0	0	0
23	DF	(Paraguay)	Pablo Aguilar	5	0	1	0	3	0	1	0	0	0	0	0
24	DF	(Paraguay)	Juan Escobar	5	1	1	1	3	0	1	0	0	0	0	0
25	MF	(Mexico)	Roberto Alvarado	5	1	1	0	3	0	1	1	0	0	0	0
27	DF	(Mexico)	José Madueña	2	0	0	0	1	0	1	0	0	0	0	0
31	MF	(Mexico)	Orbelín Pineda	4	0	0	0	3	0	1	0	0	0	0	0

Last updated: 4 August 2019
Source: Mediotiempo.com

=== Goals ===
As of 31 August 2019

Rank	Player	Position	Supercopa	Liga Apertura	Leagues Cup	Champions League	Liga Clausura	Total
1	(Argentina) Milton Caraglio	FW	1	2	0			3
1	(Mexico) Elías Hernández	MF	1	1	1			3
2	(Uruguay) Jonathan Rodríguez	FW	0	2	0			2
2	(Paraguay) Pablo Aguilar	DF	0	2	0			2
2	(Mexico) Orbelín Pineda	MF	0	1	1			2
2	(Mexico) Roberto Alvarado	MF	0	1	1			2
3	(Peru) Yoshimar Yotún	MF	0	1	0			1
3	(Mexico) José Madueña	DF	0	0	1			1
3	(Paraguay) Juan Escobar	DF	1	0	0			1
3	(Spain) Édgar Méndez	MF	1	0	0			1

=== Disciplinary record ===
N	P	Nat.	Name	Apertura			Leagues Cup			Copa MX			Clausura			Total			Notes
N	P	Nat.	Name	Yellow card	Second yellow card	Red card	Yellow card	Second yellow card	Red card	Yellow card	Second yellow card	Red card	Yellow card	Second yellow card	Red card	Yellow card	Second yellow card	Red card	Notes
4	DF	(Mexico)	Julio César Domínguez			1												1	
21	FW	(Uruguay)	Jonathan Rodríguez			1												1	
5	DF	(Chile)	Igor Lichnovsky	1			1									2			
16	DF	(Mexico)	Adrián Aldrete	2												2			
23	DF	(Paraguay)	Pablo Aguilar				1									1			
10	MF	(Argentina)	Guillermo Fernández	1												1			

Last updated: 4 August 2019
Source: LigaMX
Ordered by (red card) , (second yellow card) and (yellow card)
(yellow card) = Number of bookings; (second yellow card) = Number of sending offs after a second yellow card; (red card) = Number of sending offs by a direct red card.

=== Clean sheets ===
As of 31 August 2019

Rank	Name	Supercopa MX	Apertura	Leagues Cup	Champions League	Clausura	Total
1	(Mexico) José de Jesús Corona	1	2	1	0	0	4
