= 2018–19 Cruz Azul season =

Cruz Azul
2018–19 season
- President: Guillermo Álvarez Cuevas
- Manager: Pedro Caixinha
- Stadium: Estadio Azteca
- Liga MX: Apertura: 1st (Runners-up); Clausura: 4th (Quarter-finals)
- Copa MX: Apertura: Winners; Clausura: Group stage
- Top goalscorer: League: Elías Hernández (8); All: Martín Cauteruccio; Elías Hernández (11 each)
- Highest home attendance: 71,240 vs América (16 December 2018)
- Lowest home attendance: 4,471 vs León (16 January 2019)
- Average home league attendance: Apertura: 35,958; Clausura: 18,474; Total: 31,587
Home colours	Away colours

The 2018–19 Cruz Azul Fútbol Club season was the 92nd season in the football club's history and the 54th consecutive season in the top flight of Mexican football. Cruz Azul competed in Liga MX and Copa MX.

== Kits ==
=== Apertura ===
Supplier: Under Armour

Home	Away	Third

=== Clausura ===
Supplier: Joma

Home	Away	Alternate

== Season overview ==
=== October ===
On 31 October, Cruz Azul faced Monterrey in the Copa MX final in the Estadio BBVA Bancomer. Cruz Azul won the match 0–2, with goals from Hernández and Cauteruccio, clinching their fourth title.

=== December ===
On 13 December, Cruz Azul played the first leg of the Liga MX final against América which ended as a goalless draw. The second leg was played on 16 December with Cruz Azul losing the match 0–2. This was the first final with both legs played in the same stadium since Verano 2002.

=== January ===
Cruz Azul's four-year association with Under Armour ended with the Apertura 2018 season after being unable to reach an agreement on a new deal. Cruz Azul announced Joma as their new kit manufacturer on 1 January.

== Players ==
=== Squad information ===
Last updated on 7 January 2019

Squad No.	Name	Nationality	Position(s)	Date of Birth (Age)	Notes
Goalkeepers
1	José de Jesús Corona (captain)	(Mexico)	GK	26 January 1981 (aged 38)	
12	Guillermo Allison	(Mexico)	GK	25 September 1990 (aged 28)	Originally from youth system
21	Alejandro Peláez	(Mexico)	GK	4 February 1994 (aged 25)	Originally from youth system
Defenders
2	Pablo Aguilar	(Paraguay)	CB	2 April 1987 (aged 32)	Second nationality: (Mexico)
4	Julio César Domínguez (vice-captain)	(Mexico)	CB	8 November 1987 (aged 31)	Originally from youth system
5	Igor Lichnovsky	(Chile)	CB	7 March 1994 (aged 25)	
15	Gerardo Flores	(Mexico)	RB	5 February 1986 (aged 33)	
16	Adrián Aldrete	(Mexico)	LB/LM	14 June 1988 (aged 31)	
19	Antonio Sánchez	(Mexico)	LB	19 September 1998 (aged 20)	
27	José Madueña	(Mexico)	RB/RM	29 May 1990 (aged 29)	
30	Jordan Silva	(Mexico)	CB	30 July 1994 (aged 24)	
Midfielders
3	Stephen Eustáquio	(Portugal)	CM	21 December 1996 (aged 22)	
6	Yoshimar Yotún	(Peru)	CM/LB	7 April 1990 (aged 29)	
8	Javier Salas	(Mexico)	CM/DM	20 August 1993 (aged 25)	
14	Misael Domínguez	(Mexico)	LM/AM/LW	27 October 1999 (aged 19)	
20	Alexis Gutiérrez	(Mexico)	CM	26 February 2000 (aged 19)	
22	Rafael Baca	(Mexico)	DM/CM	11 September 1989 (aged 29)	
25	Roberto Alvarado	(Mexico)	AM/RW/LW	7 September 1998 (aged 20)	
31	Orbelín Pineda	(Mexico)	AM	24 March 1996 (aged 23)	
Forwards
7	Martín Cauteruccio	(Uruguay)	CF	14 April 1987 (aged 32)	
9	Milton Caraglio	(Argentina)	CF	1 December 1988 (aged 30)	
11	Elías Hernández	(Mexico)	RW	29 April 1988 (aged 31)	
13	Jonathan Rodríguez	(Uruguay)	CF/RW/LW	6 July 1993 (aged 25)	
17	Édgar Méndez	(Spain)	LW/RW	2 January 1990 (aged 29)	
18	Andrés Rentería	(Colombia)	RW/LW/CF	6 March 1993 (aged 26)	Second nationality: (Mexico)
28	Martín Zúñiga	(Mexico)	CF/RW	14 April 1993 (aged 26)	

=== Transfers and loans ===
==== Transfers in ====
Entry date	Position	No.	Player	From club	Type	Ref.
19 May 2018	MF	11	(Mexico) Elías Hernández	(Mexico) León	Transfer	
21 May 2018	DF	2	(Paraguay) Pablo Aguilar	(Mexico) Tijuana	Transfer	
21 May 2018	DF	5	(Chile) Igor Lichnovsky	(Mexico) Necaxa	Transfer	
21 May 2018	FW	25	(Mexico) Roberto Alvarado	(Mexico) Necaxa	Transfer	
23 May 2018	FW	9	(Argentina) Milton Caraglio	(Mexico) Atlas	Transfer	
31 May 2018	MF	23	(Argentina) Iván Marcone	(Argentina) Lanús	Transfer	
6 June 2018	MF	14	(Mexico) Misael Domínguez	(Mexico) Monterrey	Loan	
6 June 2018	MF	19	(Mexico) Antonio Sánchez	(Mexico) Leones Negros	Transfer	
6 June 2018	FW	28	(Mexico) Martín Zúñiga	(Mexico) Alebrijes de Oaxaca	Transfer	
16 June 2018	FW	18	(Colombia) Andrés Rentería	(Colombia) Atlético Nacional	Transfer	
18 December 2018	MF	31	(Mexico) Orbelín Pineda	(Mexico) Guadalajara	Transfer	
19 December 2018	FW	13	(Uruguay) Jonathan Rodríguez	(Mexico) Santos	Transfer	
22 December 2018	MF	20	(Mexico) Alexis Gutiérrez	(Mexico) Guadalajara	Transfer	
27 December 2018	MF	6	(Peru) Yoshimar Yotún	(United States) Orlando City	Transfer	
28 December 2018	MF	14	(Mexico) Misael Domínguez	(Mexico) Monterrey	Permanent Transfer	
16 January 2019	MF	3	(Portugal) Stephen Eustáquio	(Portugal) Chaves	Transfer	

==== Transfers out ====
Exit date	Position	No.	Player	To club	Type	Ref.
9 May 2018	MF	18	(Mexico) Carlos Peña	(Scotland) Rangers	Loan cancelled	
4 June 2018	FW	14	(Chile) Martín Rodríguez (Note: Originally on the club's transfer list.)	(Mexico) Pumas UNAM	Loan	
4 June 2018	MF	19	(Mexico) Rosario Cota	(Mexico) Pumas UNAM	Loan	
6 June 2018	DF	6	(Argentina) Julián Velázquez	(Mexico) Tijuana	Loan	
6 June 2018	FW	11	(Mexico) Carlos Fierro	(Mexico) Morelia	Loan	
6 June 2018	DF	–	(Mexico) Omar Mendoza (Note: Previously on loan with team that acquired the player.)	(Mexico) Tijuana	Transfer	
7 June 2018	FW	24	(Mexico) Víctor Zúñiga	(Mexico) Venados	Loan	
13 June 2018	FW	9	(Chile) Felipe Mora	(Mexico) Pumas UNAM	Loan	
28 June 2018	DF	5	(Chile) Francisco Silva	(Argentina) Independiente	Transfer	
27 July 2018	DF	3	(Chile) Enzo Roco	(Turkey) Beşiktaş	Transfer	
	DF	–	(Mexico) Francisco Javier Rodríguez	(Mexico) Lobos BUAP	Transfer	
	DF	–	(Argentina) Emanuel Loeschbor	(Mexico) Morelia	Transfer	
	GK	–	(Mexico) Yosgart Gutiérrez	(Mexico) Necaxa	Transfer	
	DF	–	(Mexico) Juan Carlos García	(Mexico) Correcaminos UAT	Transfer	
	FW	–	(Mexico) Ismael Valadéz	(Mexico) Leones Negros	Transfer	
	DF	–	(Mexico) Manuel Madrid	(Mexico) Leones Negros	Transfer	
	MF	–	(Mexico) Richard Ruíz	(Mexico) Toluca	Transfer	
	FW	–	(Mexico) Moisés Hipólito	(Mexico) Cruz Azul Hidalgo	Loan	
	DF	–	(Mexico) Francisco Flores	(Mexico) Tlaxcala		
	MF	–	(Mexico) Allam Bello	(Mexico) Potros UAEM		
	MF	–	(Mexico) Jesús García	(Mexico) Real Zamora		
	MF	–	(Mexico) Héctor Gutiérrez	(Mexico) Potros UAEM		
	MF	–	(Mexico) Jesús Henestrosa	(Mexico) Atlético Reynosa		
	FW	–	(Mexico) Jesús Lara	(Mexico) Atlético Reynosa		
	FW	–	(Argentina) Bautista Hernández	Unknown		
19 December 2018	FW	13	(Ecuador) Ángel Mena	(Mexico) León	Transfer	
20 December 2018	FW	–	(Chile) Martín Rodríguez	(Mexico) Pumas UNAM	Transfer	
20 December 2018	FW	–	(Chile) Felipe Mora	(Mexico) Pumas UNAM	Transfer	
6 January 2019	MF	10	(Argentina) Walter Montoya	(Brazil) Grêmio	Loan	
18 January 2019	MF	23	(Argentina) Iván Marcone	(Argentina) Boca Juniors	Transfer	
28 January 2019	FW	18	(Colombia) Andrés Rentería	(Argentina) San Lorenzo	Loan	

==== Transfer listed ====
Position	No.	Player	Ref.
MF	10	(Argentina) Walter Montoya	
FW	18	(Colombia) Andrés Rentería	

== Pre-season and friendlies ==
Win Draw Loss

=== Friendlies ===
==== Pre-Apertura ====
16 June 2018 1	Cruz Azul	0–0	Leones Negros	Mexico City
11:30 UTC−5		Report		Stadium: Estadio Azul; Attendance: Closed door

23 June 2018 2	Cruz Azul	1–2	Querétaro	Tula de Allende, Hidalgo
16:00 UTC−5	Mena 54'	Report	Everaldo 42'; Puch 80' (pen.)	Stadium: Estadio 10 de Diciembre; Attendance: Closed door Referee: (Mexico) José Alfredo Peñaloza

26 June 2018 3	Orange County SC (United States)	0–5	(Mexico) Cruz Azul	Irvine, United States
			Cauteruccio; Caraglio; Mena	Stadium: Orange County Great Park; Attendance: Closed door

28 June 2018 4	Cruz Azul (Mexico)	4–2	(China) Guangzhou R&F	Fullerton, United States
	Cauteruccio 24'; Mena 37'; Rentería 47'; Hernández 90'	Report	Zahavi 3'; Chang 81'	Stadium: Titan Stadium; Attendance: Closed door

30 June 2018 5	Cruz Azul	0–0	Tijuana	Irvine, United States
				Stadium: Orange County Great Park; Attendance: Closed door

3 July 2018 6	Cruz Azul	0–1	Monterrey	McAllen, United States
19:00 UTC−5		Report	Pabón 41'	Stadium: McAllen Veterans Memorial Stadium

7 July 2018 7	Cruz Azul	2–0	Potros UAEM	Mexico City
10:30 UTC−5	Alvarado 6'; Méndez 79'	Report		Stadium: Estadio Azul; Attendance: Closed door
Note: First and third periods of 45 minutes, second period of 30 minutes

14 July 2018 8	Toluca	2–2	Cruz Azul	Toluca
11:00 UTC−5	Canelo 57'; Mendoza 128'		Caraglio 25'; Cauteruccio 79'	Stadium: Estadio Nemesio Díez; Attendance: Closed door
Note: Three 45 minute periods

==== Apertura ====
13 October 2018 9	San Jose Earthquakes (United States)	0–0	(Mexico) Cruz Azul	San Jose
				Stadium: Avaya Stadium

==== Pre-Clausura ====
30 December 2018 10	Cruz Azul	3–3	Pachuca	Mexico City
10:30 CST	Méndez 55' (pen.); Cauteruccio 56', 80'	Report	Jara 50'; Cardona 53'; Bustos 85'	Stadium: La Noria; Attendance: Closed door
Note: Four quarters of 25 minutes

1 January 2019 11	Cruz Azul	3–2	Leones Negros	Mexico City
16:00 CST	Madueña 27'; Cauteruccio 29'; Caraglio 78'	Report	A. Hernández 70'; Sánchez 85'	Stadium: La Noria; Attendance: Closed door
Note: Four quarters of 25 minutes

== Competitions ==
Win Draw Loss

=== Overview ===
Competition	First match	Last match	Starting round	Final position	Record							
Competition	First match	Last match	Starting round	Final position	Pld	W	D	L	GF	GA	GD	Win %
Apertura 2018 Liga MX (Note: Includes Liguilla matches.)	21 July 2018	16 December 2018	Matchday 1	Runners-up (1st)	23	13	5	5	30	17	+13	56.52
Apertura 2018 Copa MX	1 August 2018	31 October 2018	Group stage	Winners	8	5	2	1	14	7	+7	62.50
Clausura 2019 Liga MX	4 January 2019	12 May 2019	Matchday 1	Quarter-finals (4th)	19	9	6	4	28	18	+10	47.37
Clausura 2019 Copa MX	16 January 2019	19 February 2019	Group stage	Group stage	4	1	1	2	5	6	−1	25.00
Total					54	28	14	12	77	48	+29	51.85

Last updated: 12 May 2019.
Source: Competitions

==== Aggregate table ====
The aggregate table (the sum of points of both the Apertura and Clausura tournaments) will be used to determine the participants of the Apertura 2019 Copa MX. This table also displays teams that have qualified for the 2020 CONCACAF Champions League.

Pos	Team	Pld	W	D	L	GF	GA	GD	Pts	Qualification or relegation
1	Tigres (Note: Clausura champion) (C)	34	19	9	6	65	34	+31	66	2020 CONCACAF Champions League (Note: As Clausura champions (MEX2))
2	Cruz Azul	34	19	9	6	52	28	+24	66	2020 CONCACAF Champions League (Note: As Apertura runners-up (MEX3))
3	América (Note: Apertura champion) (C)	34	18	8	8	61	36	+25	62	2020 CONCACAF Champions League (Note: As Apertura champions (MEX1))
4	Monterrey	34	17	9	8	58	40	+18	60	2019–20 Copa MX Pot 1
5	León	34	18	5	11	59	37	+22	59	2020 CONCACAF Champions League (Note: As Clausura runners-up (MEX4))
6	Pachuca	34	14	10	10	58	44	+14	52	2019–20 Copa MX Pot 1
7	Santos Laguna	34	14	10	10	48	41	+7	52	2019–20 Copa MX Pot 1
8	Toluca	34	15	6	13	55	45	+10	51	2019–20 Copa MX Pot 1
9	Pumas	34	12	11	11	48	45	+3	47	2019–20 Copa MX Pot 1
10	Tijuana	34	13	6	15	38	44	−6	45	2019–20 Copa MX Pot 2
11	Puebla	34	11	11	12	41	51	−10	44	2019–20 Copa MX Pot 2
12	Necaxa	34	11	10	13	51	53	−2	43	2019–20 Copa MX Pot 2
13	BUAP (Note: BUAP relocated to Ciudad Juárez and became FC Juárez, thus Juárez replaced them in the tournament)	34	11	6	17	38	59	−21	39	2019–20 Copa MX Pot 2
14	Guadalajara	34	10	8	16	37	43	−6	38	2019–20 Copa MX Pot 3
15	Morelia	34	9	11	14	43	57	−14	38	2019–20 Copa MX Pot 3
16	Querétaro	34	10	7	17	30	50	−20	37	2019–20 Copa MX Pot 3
17	Atlas	34	8	6	20	30	55	−25	30	2019–20 Copa MX Pot 3
18	Veracruz (Note: Veracruz were docked 6 points, at the request of FIFA, over a failure to pay training compensation fees to Uruguayan club Montevideo Wanderers for Matías Santos.) (R)	34	2	8	24	24	74	−50	8	Relegated to Ascenso MX; 2019–20 Copa MX Pot 3

Source: Liga MX
Rules for classification: 1) Points; 2) Goal difference; 3) Number of goals scored; 4) Head-to-head results between tied teams; 5) Number of goals scored away; 6) Highest relegation coefficient; 7) Fair Play points
(C) Champions; (R) Relegated

=== Apertura 2018 ===
==== Liga MX ====
===== Standings =====
Pos	Team	Pld	W	D	L	GF	GA	GD	Pts	Qualification or relegation
1	Cruz Azul	17	11	3	3	26	13	+13	36	Advance to Liguilla (Note: The first 8 places in the table qualified for the Liguilla. The last ranked team in the relegation table could qualify for the Liguilla in the Apertura tournament.)
2	América (C)	17	9	6	2	33	17	+16	33	Advance to Liguilla
3	Pumas	17	8	6	3	29	19	+10	30	Advance to Liguilla
4	Santos Laguna	17	8	6	3	27	18	+9	30	Advance to Liguilla
5	Monterrey	17	9	3	5	25	19	+6	30	Advance to Liguilla

Source: Liga MX
Rules for classification: 1) Points; 2) Goal difference; 3) Number of goals scored; 4) Head-to-head results between tied teams; 5) Number of goals scored away; 6) Highest relegation coefficient; 7) Fair Play points
(C) Champions

===== Results summary =====
Includes liguilla.

Overall								Home						Away					
Pld	W	D	L	GF	GA	GD	Pts	W	D	L	GF	GA	GD	W	D	L	GF	GA	GD
23	13	5	5	30	15	+15	44	9	2	1	20	4	+16	4	3	4	10	11	−1

Last updated: 16 December 2018.

===== Results by round =====
Round	1	2	3	4	5	6	7	8	9	10	11	12	13	14	15	16	17	18	19	20	21	22	23
Ground	H	A	H	A	H	H	A	H	A	H	A	H	A	H	A	H	A	A	H	A	H	A	H
Result	W	W	W	D	W	W	D	W	L	W	L	W	L	D	W	W	W	W	D	L	W	D	L
Position	1	2	2	2	1	1	1	1	1	1	1	1	2	3	1	1	1	QF	QF	SF	SF	F	F

Updated to match(es) played on 8 December 2018. Source: Liga MX
A = Away; H = Home; W = Win; D = Draw; L = Loss; F = Final; QF = Quarter-final; SF = Semi-final

===== Matches =====
21 July 2018 1	Cruz Azul	3–0	Puebla	Mexico City
17:00 CDT	Flores (yellow card) 45'; Aguilar (yellow card) 65'; Rentería 81'; Caraglio 90+2' (pen.); Hernández 90+4'	Liga MX; Referee Report; Cruz Azul	H. Rodríguez (yellow card) 38'; Pimentel (yellow card) 42'; Vikonis (yellow card) 90+2'	Stadium: Estadio Azteca; Attendance: 45,385; Referee: Roberto Rios Jácome

28 July 2018 2	Guadalajara	0–1	Cruz Azul	Zapopan
21:06 CDT	Van Rankin (yellow card) 30'; Pereira (yellow card) 62'	Liga MX; Referee Report	Cauteruccio 46'; Marcone (yellow card) 51'; Aguilar (yellow card) 60'	Stadium: Estadio Akron; Attendance: 37,412; Referee: Fernando Hernández Gómez

4 August 2018 3	Cruz Azul	1–0	Tigres UANL	Mexico City
21:00 CDT	Alvarado 68'; Cauteruccio (yellow card) 80'; Aldrete (yellow card) 84'	Report; Referee Report	Damm (yellow card) 14'; Dueñas (yellow card) 19'; Torres Nilo (yellow card) 23'; Ayala (yellow card) 80'; Pizarro (yellow card) 84'	Stadium: Estadio Azteca; Attendance: 55,571; Referee: Marco Antonio Ortíz Nava

12 August 2018 4	Tijuana	1–1	Cruz Azul	Tijuana
20:00 CDT	Bolaños (yellow card) 7', (goal) 78'; Velázquez (yellow card) 17'; Mendoza (yellow card) 40'	Liga MX; Referee Report	Aguilar (yellow card) 19' (yellow-red card) 22'; Aldrete (yellow card) 42'; Marcone (yellow card) 45'; Flores 90+1'	Stadium: Estadio Caliente; Attendance: 27,333; Referee: Luis Enrique Santander Aguirre

18 August 2018 5	Cruz Azul	3–0	León	Mexico City
17:00 CDT	Aldrete (yellow card) 16'; Flores (red card) 18'; Hernández 31', 40'; Marcone (yellow card) 37'; Caraglio 88'	Liga MX; Referee Report	Cota (yellow card) 2'; Mejía (red card) 36'	Stadium: Estadio Azteca; Attendance: 30,260; Referee: César Arturo Ramos

22 August 2018 6	Cruz Azul	1–0	Toluca	Mexico City
19:00 CDT	Cauteruccio 35'; Corona (yellow card) 83'	Liga MX; Referee Report	Domínguez (yellow card) 51'	Stadium: Estadio Azteca; Attendance: 31,120; Referee: Francisco Chacón

26 August 2018 7	Santos Laguna	1–1	Cruz Azul	Torreón
18:00 CDT	Angulo (yellow card) 39'; Quiñones 85'	Liga MX; Referee Report	Aguilar (yellow card) 62'; Cauteruccio 76'; Corona (yellow card) 90+4'	Stadium: Estadio Corona; Attendance: 28,460; Referee: Óscar Macías Romo

1 September 2018 8	Cruz Azul	4–1	Veracruz	Mexico City
17:00 CDT	Baca (yellow card) 28'; Alvarado 32'; Hernández 55'; Caraglio (yellow card) 57', (goal) 70'; Noya 76' (o.g.)	Liga MX	Paganoni (yellow card) 32'; Carrasco 48' (pen.)	Stadium: Estadio Azteca; Attendance: 26,039; Referee: Roberto García Orozco

15 September 2018 9	Necaxa	2–0	Cruz Azul	Aguascalientes
21:00 CDT	M. Fernández 17'; Dávila (yellow card) 37', (goal) 85' (pen.); Alvarado (yellow card) 49'; H. González (yellow card) 66'	Referee Report	Aldrete (yellow card) 58'	Stadium: Estadio Victoria; Attendance: 22,578; Referee: César Arturo Ramos

22 September 2018 10	Cruz Azul	2–0	Atlas	Mexico City
21:00 CDT	Aldrete 17'; Marcone (yellow card) 25'; Caraglio 56'	Referee Report	Vigón (yellow card) 51'; J. Hernández (yellow card) 67'; Rivero (yellow card) 73'	Stadium: Estadio Azteca; Attendance: 18,541; Referee: Diego Montaño Robles

29 September 2018 11	Pachuca	3–1	Cruz Azul	Pachuca
19:00 CDT	Ulloa 7'; Tapias 31'; P. López 42'	Referee Report	Madueña (red card) 22'; Aguilar 45+1'; Aldrete (yellow card) 80'; Caraglio (red card) 87'	Stadium: Estadio Hidalgo; Attendance: 27,512; Referee: Fernando Guerrero Ramírez

6 October 2018 12	Cruz Azul	2–1	Monterrey	Mexico City
17:00 CDT	Hernández 21' (pen.); Méndez 71'; Cauteruccio (yellow card) 88'	Referee Report	Montes 15'; Funes Mori (red card) 23'; Vangioni (yellow card) 70'; Vásquez (yellow card) 89'	Stadium: Estadio Azteca; Attendance: 27,689; Referee: Fernando Hernández Gómez

20 October 2018 13	Querétaro	2–0	Cruz Azul	Santiago de Querétaro
17:00 CDT	Corral (yellow card) 29'; Cortizo (yellow card) 32'; Sanvezzo 88'; M. Ruiz 90'	Referee Report		Stadium: Estadio Corregidora; Attendance: 29,348; Referee: Francisco Chacón Gutiérrez

27 October 2018 14	Cruz Azul	0–0	América	Mexico City
21:00 CDT	Marcone (yellow card) 24'; Salas (yellow card) 76'	Referee Report		Stadium: Estadio Azteca; Attendance: 62,003; Referee: Jorge Antonio Pérez Durán

4 November 2018 15	Pumas UNAM	1–2	Cruz Azul	Ciudad Universitaria
12:00 CST	Barrera (yellow card) 44'; Mora 84'	Liga MX; Referee Report	Méndez 15'; Rentería 79'; Aldrete (yellow card) 86' (yellow-red card) 90+1'	Stadium: Estadio Olímpico Universitario; Attendance: 42,717; Referee: Jorge Isaac Rojas Castillo

10 November 2018 16	Cruz Azul	2–1	Lobos BUAP	Mexico City
17:00 CST	Cauteruccio 32'; Madueña 41'	Liga MX; Referee Report	Ramos 19'; Crisanto (yellow card) 60'; Chirinos (yellow card) 87'	Stadium: Estadio Azteca; Attendance: 27,017; Referee: César Arturo Ramos

23 November 2018 17	Morelia	0–2	Cruz Azul	Morelia
19:00 CST	Vegas (yellow card) 18'; Loeschbor (yellow card) 44'	Report; Referee Report	Cauteruccio 67'; Aguilar 73'	Stadium: Estadio Morelos; Attendance: 28,076; Referee: Luis Enrique Santander Aguirre

====== Quarter-finals ======
28 November 2018 First leg	Querétaro	0–2	Cruz Azul	Santiago de Querétaro
19:00 CST	Güémez (yellow card) 81'	Report; Referee Report	Aguilar 16'; Méndez 59', (yellow card) 88'; Marcone (yellow card) 80'	Stadium: Estadio Corregidora; Attendance: 29,039; Referee: Diego Montaño Robles

1 December 2018 Second leg	Cruz Azul	1–1 (3–1 agg.)	Querétaro	Mexico City
19:00 CST	Hernández 4'; Méndez (yellow card) 11'; J. Domínguez (yellow card) 69'	Report; Referee Report	Romo 60'	Stadium: Estadio Azteca; Attendance: 30,858; Referee: Jorge Antonio Pérez Durán

====== Semi-finals ======
5 December 2018 First leg	Monterrey	1–0	Cruz Azul	Guadalupe
20:06 CST	Pizarro 3'; Funes Mori (yellow card) 88'; Pabón (yellow card) 88'	Report; Referee Report	Alvarado (yellow card) 51'; Aldrete (yellow card) 62'; Cauteruccio (yellow card) 68'	Stadium: Estadio BBVA Bancomer; Attendance: 36,721; Referee: César Arturo Ramos

8 December 2018 Second leg	Cruz Azul	1–0 (1–1 agg.)	Monterrey	Mexico City
19:00 CST	Marcone (yellow card) 29'; Caraglio 54', (yellow card) 74'; J. Domínguez (yellow card) 69'; Baca (yellow card) 90+1'	Report; Referee Report	Vangioni (yellow card) 23'; Medina (yellow card) 76'; Funes Mori (yellow card) 79'	Stadium: Estadio Azteca; Attendance: 39,307; Referee: Fernando Guerrero Ramírez
Note: 1–1 on aggregate and tied on away goals. Cruz Azul advanced as the higher seed in the classification table.

====== Final ======
13 December 2018 First leg	América	0–0	Cruz Azul	Mexico City
20:30 CST	Ibarra (yellow card) 41'; Aguilar (yellow card) 90+2'; Aguilera (yellow card) 90+6'	Report; Referee Report	Caraglio (yellow card) 17'; Méndez (yellow card) 87'; Marcone (yellow card) 90+2'	Stadium: Estadio Azteca; Attendance: 79,244; Referee: Fernando Guerrero Ramírez

16 December 2018 Second leg	Cruz Azul	0–2 (0–2 agg.)	América	Mexico City
18:30 CST	Cauteruccio (yellow card) 15'; Alvarado (yellow card) 81'; Flores (red card) 86'	Report	Aguilera (yellow card) 39'; Sánchez (yellow card) 45+1'; Peralta (yellow card) 63'; Álvarez 50', 89'; Ibargüen (yellow card) 85'	Stadium: Estadio Azteca; Attendance: 71,240; Referee: César Arturo Ramos

==== Copa MX ====
On 5 June, Cruz Azul were drawn in Group 6 of the Copa MX alongside Liga MX club Atlas, and Ascenso MX club Zacatepec.

===== Group stage =====
Pos	Team	Pld	W	D	L	GF	GA	GD	Pts	Qualification
1	Cruz Azul	4	2	1	1	7	5	+2	7	Advance to knockout stage
2	Zacatepec	4	2	0	2	7	8	−1	6	Advance to knockout stage
3	Atlas	4	1	1	2	6	7	−1	4	

Source: Copa MX
Rules for classification: Tiebreakers

1 August 2018 2	Zacatepec	2–3	Cruz Azul	Zacatepec
19:00 CDT	Cisneros 6' (pen.); Rippa (yellow card) 32'; Akrong 63'	Copa MX; Referee Report	Cauteruccio 4', 59', (yellow card) 46'; Hernández 82'	Stadium: Estadio Agustín "Coruco" Díaz; Attendance: 15,652; Referee: Luis Daniel Chávez León

8 August 2018 3	Cruz Azul	2–2	Atlas	Mexico City
19:00 CDT	M. Domínguez (red card) 29'; Caraglio 30'; Alvarado 35'; Baca (yellow card) 66'	Copa MX; Referee Report	Torres (yellow card) 38'; Rivero 44', 76'; Calderón (yellow card) 85'	Stadium: Estadio Azteca; Attendance: 16,225; Referee: Jorge Isaac Rojas Castillo

15 August 2018 4	Cruz Azul	2–0	Zacatepec	Mexico City
19:00 CDT	Caraglio 57'; Cauteruccio 90+1'	Copa MX; Referee Report	Gaspar (red card) 36'; Cortés (yellow card) 50'; K. Ramírez (yellow card) 80'	Stadium: Estadio Azteca; Attendance: 7,895; Referee: Adonai Escobedo González

29 August 2018 5	Atlas	1–0	Cruz Azul	Guadalajara
21:00 CDT	Vigón 33'; Andrade (yellow card) 35'; J. Hernández (yellow card) 90+2'	Copa MX; Referee Report	Salas (yellow card) 42'; Zúñiga (yellow card) 81'; Rentería (yellow card) 87'; Sánchez (red card) 90+4'	Stadium: Estadio Jalisco; Attendance: 24,670; Referee: Oscar Mejía

===== Knockout stage =====
====== Round of 16 ======
25 September 2018 R16	Tijuana	1–2	Cruz Azul	Tijuana
21:15 CDT	Velázquez (yellow card) 22'; Castillo (red card) 27'; Madueña 61' (o.g.); Canto (yellow card) 87'	Copa MX; Referee Report	Méndez 32', (yellow card) 32'; Lichnovsky (yellow card) 44'; Cauteruccio 57'; Allison (yellow card) 77'	Stadium: Estadio Caliente; Attendance: 23,333; Referee: Adonai Escobedo González

====== Quarter-finals ======
2 October 2018 QF	Cruz Azul	2–0	FC Juárez	Mexico City
19:00 CDT	Marcone (yellow card) 39'; Alvarado 60'; Méndez (yellow card) 61'; Cauteruccio 72'	Copa MX; Referee Report	Castro (yellow card) 40' (red card) 45+1'; Dias (yellow card) 73'; Lacerda (yellow card) 77'; Rodríguez (yellow card) 81'	Stadium: Estadio Azteca; Attendance: 13,580; Referee: Edgar Ulises Rangel Araujo

====== Semi-finals ======
24 October 2018 SF	Cruz Azul	1–1 (5–4 p)	León	Mexico City
20:30 CDT	Aldrete 72'; Méndez (yellow card) 84'	Copa MX; Referee Report	Tesillo (yellow card) 4'; Boselli (red card) 18'; Navarro 52'	Stadium: Estadio Azteca; Attendance: 25,724; Referee: José Alfredo Peñaloza
	Penalties
	Hernández (penalty scored); Méndez (penalty scored); Alvarado (penalty scored); Aldrete (penalty scored); Cauteruccio (penalty scored)		(penalty scored) Calero; (penalty scored) Navarro; (penalty missed) W. González; (penalty scored) Cornejo; (penalty scored) Tesillo

====== Final ======
31 October 2018 Final	Monterrey	0–2	Cruz Azul	Guadalupe
20:36 CST	Ortiz (yellow card) 47'; Vásquez (yellow card) 55'	Copa MX; Referee Report	Lichnovsky (yellow card) 18'; Hernández 33'; Cauteruccio 51'	Stadium: Estadio BBVA Bancomer; Attendance: 49,764; Referee: Fernando Guerrero Ramírez

=== Clausura 2019 ===
==== Liga MX ====
===== Standings =====
Pos	Team	Pld	W	D	L	GF	GA	GD	Pts	Qualification or relegation
2	Tigres UANL (C)	17	11	4	2	33	16	+17	37	Advance to Liguilla (Note: The first 8 places in the table qualified for the Liguilla.)
3	Monterrey	17	8	6	3	33	21	+12	30	Advance to Liguilla
4	Cruz Azul	17	8	6	3	26	15	+11	30	Advance to Liguilla
5	América	17	9	2	6	28	19	+9	29	Advance to Liguilla
6	Necaxa	17	8	5	4	32	24	+8	29	Advance to Liguilla

Source: Liga MX
Rules for classification: 1) Points; 2) Goal difference; 3) Number of goals scored; 4) Head-to-head results between tied teams; 5) Number of goals scored away; 6) Highest relegation coefficient; 7) Fair Play points
(C) Champions

===== Results summary =====
Overall								Home						Away					
Pld	W	D	L	GF	GA	GD	Pts	W	D	L	GF	GA	GD	W	D	L	GF	GA	GD
17	8	6	3	26	15	+11	30	5	1	2	14	7	+7	3	5	1	12	8	+4

Last updated: 4 May 2019.

===== Results by round =====
Round	1	2	3	4	5	6	7	8	9	10	11	12	13	14	15	16	17	18	19
Ground	A	H	A	H	A	A	H	A	H	A	H	A	H	A	H	A	H	A	H
Result	D	L	W	W	L	D	L	D	W	W	W	D	W	D	W	W	D	L	W
Position	8	12	9	6	10	10	14	14	12	10	7	7	5	7	4	4	4	QF	QF

Updated to match(es) played on 12 May 2019. Source:
A = Away; H = Home; W = Win; D = Draw; L = Loss; QF = Quarter-finals

===== Matches =====
4 January 2019 1	Puebla	1–1	Cruz Azul	Puebla
21:00 CST	Cavallini 28' (pen.)	Report; Referee Report	Hernández 24'; J. Domínguez (yellow card) 90'	Stadium: Estadio Cuauhtémoc; Attendance: 22,777; Referee: Edgar Ulises Rangel Araujo

12 January 2019 2	Cruz Azul	0–1	Guadalajara	Mexico City
19:00 CST		Report; Referee Report	Cisneros 79'	Stadium: Estadio Azteca; Attendance: 32,881; Referee: Jorge Isaac Rojas

19 January 2019 3	Tigres UANL	0–1	Cruz Azul	San Nicolás de los Garza
21:00 CST	Pizarro (yellow card) 31'	Referee Report	Hernández 32'; Alvarado (yellow card) 43'; Lichnovsky (yellow card) 79'; Corona (yellow card) 81'	Stadium: Estadio Universitario; Attendance: 41,615; Referee: Fernando Guerrero Ramírez

26 January 2019 4	Cruz Azul	1–0	Tijuana	Mexico City
17:00 CST	Hernández 23'; Eustáquio (yellow card) 61'	Referee Report	González (yellow card) 31'; Velázquez (yellow card) 42'; Braghieri (yellow card) 50'	Stadium: Estadio Azteca; Attendance: 10,311; Referee: Óscar Mejía García

2 February 2019 5	León	2–0	Cruz Azul	León
19:00 CST	Mena 19'; J. Rodríguez (yellow card) 37'; Meneses 44'; W. González (yellow card) 90+1'	Referee Report	Yotún (red card) 16'; Baca (yellow card) 22'; Madueña (yellow card) 27'; Lichnovsky (yellow card) 44'	Stadium: Estadio León; Attendance: 23,289; Referee: Diego Montaño Robles

10 February 2019 6	Toluca	1–1	Cruz Azul	Toluca
12:00 CST	da Silva (yellow card) 22'; Mora 65'; Maidana (yellow card) 75'	Report; Referee Report	Baca (yellow card) 23'; Pineda 26'; Aldrete (yellow card) 53'	Stadium: Estadio Nemesio Diez; Attendance: 19,221; Referee: Francisco Chacón Gutiérrez

16 February 2019 7	Cruz Azul	1–2	Santos Laguna	Mexico City
17:00 CST	Alvarado (yellow card) 20'; Caraglio 23'; Aldrete (yellow card) 65'; Cauteruccio (yellow card) 74'; J. Domínguez (yellow card) 87'; Corona (yellow card) 90+4'	Report; Referee Report	Nervo 29'; Preciado 47'; Moreno (yellow card) 72'; de Buen (yellow card) 84'	Stadium: Estadio Azteca; Attendance: 12,231; Referee: Eduardo Galvan Basulto

22 February 2019 8	Veracruz	1–1	Cruz Azul	Veracruz
21:00 CST	Kazim-Richards 29', (yellow card) 56'; Noriega (yellow card) 59'	Report; Referee Report	Corona (yellow card) 18'; Lichnovsky (yellow card) 24'; Aguilar (yellow card) 37'; Fabrício 72' (o.g.)	Stadium: Estadio Luis "Pirata" Fuente; Attendance: 17,978; Referee: Marco Antonio Ortiz Nava

2 March 2019 9	Cruz Azul	2–1	Necaxa	Mexico City
17:00 CST	Aguilar (yellow card) 13'; Caraglio (yellow card) 22', (goal) 60'; Aldrete (yellow card) 34'; Méndez 65'	Report	Fernández 3'; Calderón (yellow card) 32'	Stadium: Estadio Azteca; Referee: Diego Montaño Robles

8 March 2019 10	Atlas	0–2	Cruz Azul	Guadalajara
21:00 CST	Vigon (yellow card) 8' (yellow-red card) 90'; Martínez (yellow card) 90'	Report	J. Domínguez 14'; Yotún 52'	Stadium: Estadio Jalisco; Referee: Luis Enrique Santander Aguirre

16 March 2019 11	Cruz Azul	4–1	Pachuca	Mexico City
17:00 CST	Baca 1'; Caraglio 25', (yellow card) 27', (goal) 87'; Aldrete 44'; Pineda (yellow card) 44'; Ulloa 58' (o.g.); Javier Salas (yellow card) 59'; Aguilar (red card) 69'	Report	Cardona (yellow card) 44', (goal) 73'; Jara (yellow card) 44'; Sosa (yellow card) 65'	Stadium: Estadio Azteca; Referee: Adonai Escobedo Gonzalez

30 March 2019 12	Monterrey	2–2	Cruz Azul	Guadalupe
21:00 CST	Funes Mori (yellow card) 16'; Vangioni (yellow card) 16'; Hurtado 44'; Montes 48'	Report	Madueña (yellow card) 18'; Baca (yellow card) 23'; Yotún (yellow card) 40'; Caraglio 75'; Lichnovsky 90'	Stadium: Estadio BBVA Bancomer; Referee: Eduardo Galvan Basulto

6 April 2019 13	Cruz Azul	3–0	Querétaro	Mexico City
17:00 CST	Pineda 17'; Caraglio 63', (yellow card) 64', (goal) 78'; Baca (red card) 89'	Report	Britos (yellow card) 32'; Pérez (yellow card) 39'	Stadium: Estadio Azteca; Referee: Alejandro Funk Villafañe

14 April 2019 14	América	0–0	Cruz Azul	Mexico City
18:30 CDT	Marchesin (yellow card) 13'	Report	Caraglio (yellow card) 12'	Stadium: Estadio Azteca; Referee: Marco Antonio Ortiz Nava

20 April 2019 15	Cruz Azul	2–1	Pumas UNAM	Mexico City
19:00 CDT	Yotún (yellow card) 19'; Caraglio 44', 54'; Lichnovsky (yellow card) 47'	Report	Barrera (yellow card) 11', (goal) 64'; Escamilla (yellow card) 28' (yellow-red card) 38'; Jáquez (yellow card) 42'	Stadium: Estadio Azteca; Referee: Jorge Antonio Pérez Durán

28 April 2019 16	Lobos BUAP	1–4	Cruz Azul	Puebla
16:00 CDT				Stadium: Estadio Universitario BUAP

4 May 2019 17	Cruz Azul	1–1	Morelia	Mexico City
17:00 CDT				Stadium: Estadio Azteca

====== Quarter-finals ======
9 May 2019 First leg	América	3–1	Cruz Azul	Mexico City
21:05 CDT	Sánchez (yellow card) 13'; Lichnovsky 21' (o.g.); Martínez 44', 73'	Report	Caraglio 14', (yellow card) 90+3'; Lichnovsky (yellow card) 56'; Méndez (yellow card) 68'; Aguilar (yellow card) 85'	Stadium: Estadio Azteca; Referee: Jorge Isaac Rojas Castillo

12 May 2019 Second leg	Cruz Azul	1–0 (2–3 agg.)	América	Mexico City
18:10 CDT	Lichnovsky (yellow card) 10'; J. Rodríguez 48'; Cauteruccio (yellow card) 90'; Caraglio (yellow card) 90+2'	Report	Sánchez (yellow card) 60'; Ibarra (yellow card) 90+2'; Peralta (yellow card) 90+3'	Stadium: Estadio Azteca; Referee: Fernando Guerrero Ramírez

==== Copa MX ====
On 11 December, Cruz Azul were drawn in Group 5 of the Copa MX alongside Liga MX club León, and Ascenso MX club Oaxaca.

===== Group stage =====
Pos	Team	Pld	W	D	L	GF	GA	GD	Pts	Qualification
1	Oaxaca	4	2	1	1	4	3	+1	7	Advance to knockout stage
2	León	4	1	2	1	5	5	0	5	Advance to knockout stage
3	Cruz Azul	4	1	1	2	5	6	−1	4	

Updated to match(es) played on 19 February 2019. Source: Copa MX

16 January 2019 2	Cruz Azul	2–3	León	Mexico City
19:00 CST	Rodríguez 19', 73' (pen.); M. Domínguez (yellow card) 51'	Referee Report	Mena 6'; Montes (yellow card) 23'; Caraglio 28' (o.g.); Sambueza 53'; Herrera (yellow card) 57'; Zúñiga (yellow card) 64'; Meneses (yellow card) 90+1'	Stadium: Estadio Azteca; Attendance: 4,471; Referee: Alejandro Funk Villafañe

23 January 2019 3	Oaxaca	1–2	Cruz Azul	Oaxaca
19:00 CST				Stadium: Estadio Tecnológico de Oaxaca

6 February 2019 5	León	1–1	Cruz Azul	León
19:00 CST				Stadium: Estadio León

19 February 2019 6	Cruz Azul	0–1	Oaxaca	Mexico City
21:00 CST				Stadium: Estadio Azteca

== Squad statistics ==
=== Appearances ===
Players with no appearances not included in the list.
As of matches played 16 January 2019
Includes all competitive matches.

Sortable table
No.	Pos.	Nat.	Name	Liga Apertura		Copa Apertura		Liga Clausura		Copa Clausura		Total	
No.	Pos.	Nat.	Name	Apps	Starts	Apps	Starts	Apps	Starts	Apps	Starts	Apps	Starts
1	GK	(Mexico)	José de Jesús Corona	22	22	0	0	2	2	0	0	24	24
2	DF	(Paraguay)	Pablo Aguilar	22	22	6	6	2	2	1	1	31	31
4	DF	(Mexico)	Julio César Domínguez	23	22	5	4	2	2	0	0	30	28
5	DF	(Chile)	Igor Lichnovsky	17	8	6	6	0	0	1	1	24	15
6	MF	(Peru)	Yoshimar Yotún	0	0	0	0	2	0	0	0	2	0
7	FW	(Uruguay)	Martín Cauteruccio	22	14	8	5	2	2	0	0	32	21
8	MF	(Mexico)	Javier Salas	13	8	6	6	1	1	1	1	21	16
9	FW	(Argentina)	Milton Caraglio	18	11	5	3	2	0	1	1	26	15
11	FW	(Mexico)	Elías Hernández	23	23	4	2	2	2	0	0	29	27
12	GK	(Mexico)	Guillermo Allison	1	1	8	8	0	0	1	1	10	10
13	FW	(Uruguay)	Jonathan Rodríguez	0	0	0	0	2	1	1	1	3	2
14	MF	(Mexico)	Misael Domínguez	1	0	7	5	0	0	1	1	9	6
15	DF	(Mexico)	Gerardo Flores	5	5	0	0	0	0	0	0	5	5
16	DF	(Mexico)	Adrián Aldrete	22	22	4	4	2	2	1	1	29	29
17	FW	(Spain)	Édgar Méndez	23	19	8	4	2	1	1	0	34	24
18	FW	(Colombia)	Andrés Rentería	10	2	3	1	0	0	0	0	13	3
19	DF	(Mexico)	Antonio Sánchez	0	0	7	4	0	0	0	0	7	4
20	MF	(Mexico)	Alexis Gutiérrez	0	0	0	0	0	0	1	1	1	1
22	MF	(Mexico)	Rafael Baca	21	17	4	3	0	0	0	0	25	20
24 (Note: Held the youth squad number 342 for the Apertura season and was given the first team number 24 for the Clausura season.)	DF	(Mexico)	Jorge García	0	0	1	0	0	0	0	0	1	0
25	MF	(Mexico)	Roberto Alvarado	23	18	8	8	2	2	1	0	34	28
27	DF	(Mexico)	José Madueña	15	13	7	7	2	2	1	1	25	23
28	FW	(Mexico)	Martín Zúñiga	2	0	1	0	0	0	1	0	4	0
30	DF	(Mexico)	Jordan Silva	1	0	1	1	0	0	0	0	2	1
31	MF	(Mexico)	Orbelín Pineda	0	0	0	0	2	2	1	1	3	3
Players who are on loan/left Cruz Azul that have appeared this season
10	MF	(Argentina)	Walter Montoya	5	1	4	4	0	0	0	0	9	5
13	FW	(Ecuador)	Ángel Mena	9	2	2	2	0	0	0	0	11	4
23	MF	(Argentina)	Iván Marcone	23	23	6	5	1	1	0	0	30	29

=== Goalscorers ===
Includes all competitive matches.

As of matches played 16 February 2019

Rank	Pos.	No.	Player	Liga Apertura	Liguilla Apertura	Copa Apertura	Liga Clausura	Copa Clausura	Total
1	FW	7	(Uruguay) Martín Cauteruccio	5	0	6	0	0	11
1	MF	11	(Mexico) Elías Hernández	5	1	2	3	0	11
3	FW	9	(Argentina) Milton Caraglio	4	1	2	1	0	8
4	FW	17	(Spain) Édgar Méndez	2	1	1	0	1	5
5	MF	25	(Mexico) Roberto Alvarado	2	0	2	0	0	4
6	DF	2	(Paraguay) Pablo Aguilar	2	1	0	0	0	3
7	DF	16	(Mexico) Adrián Aldrete	1	0	1	0	0	2
7	FW	18	(Colombia) Andrés Rentería	2	0	0	0	0	2
7	FW	13	(Uruguay) Jonathan Rodríguez	0	0	0	0	2	2
10	DF	15	(Mexico) Gerardo Flores	1	0	0	0	0	1
10	DF	27	(Mexico) José Madueña	1	0	0	0	0	1
10	MF	14	(Mexico) Misael Domínguez	0	0	0	0	1	1
10	MF	31	(Mexico) Orbelín Pineda	0	0	0	1	0	1
10	MF	6	(Peru) Yoshimar Yotún	0	0	0	0	1	1
Own Goals				1	0	0	0	0	1
Total				26	4	14	5	5	53

=== Clean sheets ===
Includes all competitive matches.

Correct as of matches played on 16 February 2019

No.	Player	Liga Apertura	Copa Apertura	Liga Clausura	Copa Clausura	Total
1	(Mexico) José de Jesús Corona	10	0	2	0	12
12	(Mexico) Guillermo Allison	1	3	0	0	4
Total		11	3	2	0	16

=== Disciplinary record ===
As of matches played 16 January 2019

Includes all competitive matches.

No.	Pos.	Name	Liga Apertura			Copa Apertura			Liga Clausura			Copa Clausura			Total		
No.	Pos.	Name	Booked	(yellow card) (yellow-red card)	Sent off (straight red)	Booked	(yellow card) (yellow-red card)	Sent off (straight red)	Booked	(yellow card) (yellow-red card)	Sent off (straight red)	Booked	(yellow card) (yellow-red card)	Sent off (straight red)	Booked	(yellow card) (yellow-red card)	Sent off (straight red)
1	GK	(Mexico) José de Jesús Corona	2												2		
2	DF	(Paraguay) Pablo Aguilar	4	1											4	1	
4	DF	(Mexico) Julio César Domínguez	2						1						3		
5	DF	(Chile) Igor Lichnovsky				2									2		
7	FW	(Uruguay) Martín Cauteruccio	4			1									5		
8	MF	(Mexico) Javier Salas	1			1									2		
9	FW	(Argentina) Milton Caraglio	3		1										3		1
12	GK	(Mexico) Guillermo Allison				1									1		
14	MF	(Mexico) Misael Domínguez						1				1			1		1
15	DF	(Mexico) Gerardo Flores	1		2										1		2
16	DF	(Mexico) Adrián Aldrete	6	1											6	1	
17	FW	(Spain) Édgar Méndez	3			3									6		
18	FW	(Colombia) Andrés Rentería				1									1		
19	DF	(Mexico) Antonio Sánchez						1									1
22	MF	(Mexico) Rafael Baca	2			1									3		
23	MF	(Argentina) Iván Marcone	8			1									9		
25	MF	(Mexico) Roberto Alvarado	2												2		
27	DF	(Mexico) José Madueña			1												1
28	FW	(Mexico) Martín Zúñiga				1									1		
Total			38	2	4	12		2	1			1			52	2	6

=== Injury record ===
N	P	Nat.	Name	Type	Status	Source	Match	Inj. Date	Ret. Date
28	FW	(Mexico)	Martín Zúñiga	Thigh Injury (adductor minimus muscle in right thigh)		Cruz Azul	in training	8 June 2018	
13	FW	(Ecuador)	Ángel Mena	Thigh Injury (in right thigh)		Record	vs Toluca	14 July 2018	6 August 2018
15	DF	(Mexico)	Gerardo Flores	Knee Injury (edema in knee)		Cruz Azul	in training	27 July 2018	3 August 2018
9	FW	(Argentina)	Milton Caraglio	Leg Injury (in right leg)		MedioTiempo	vs Guadalajara	28 July 2018	6 August 2018
18	FW	(Colombia)	Andrés Rentería	Knee Injury (bruised femur in left knee)		Azteca	vs Zacatepec	1 August 2018	15 August 2018

- Player is injured
- Player has recovered from injury
Last updated: 15 August 2018
