= Martín Cauteruccio =

Uruguayan footballer (born 1987)

Personal information
- Full name: Martín Andrés Cauteruccio Rodríguez
- Date of birth: 14 April 1987 (age 39)
- Place of birth: Montevideo, Uruguay
- Height: 1.77 m (5 ft 10 in)
- Position: Forward

Team information
- Current team: Bolívar
- Number: 9

Youth career
- Nacional

Senior career*
Years	Team	Apps	(Gls)
2007–2011	Nacional	30	(4)
2008	→ Central Español (loan)	14	(5)
2009–2010	→ Racing Montevideo (loan)	24	(12)
2011–2013	Quilmes	91	(32)
2013–2017	San Lorenzo	78	(29)
2017–2019	Cruz Azul	83	(11)
2020–2021	Estudiantes	24	(6)
2021–2022	Aldosivi	52	(25)
2023	Independiente	35	(11)
2024–2025	Sporting Cristal	42	(43)
2025–	Bolívar	15	(8)
- * Club domestic league appearances and goals as of 30 December 2025

Martín Andrés Cauteruccio Rodríguez (born 14 April 1987) is a Uruguayan professional footballer who plays as a striker for Bolivian Primera División club Bolívar.

== Career ==
=== Nacional ===
Born in Montevideo, Cauteruccio began his professional career with local side Nacional.

=== Quilmes ===
He joined Argentine Primera División side Quilmes, where he would lead the club in goal-scoring despite the club's struggles near the bottom of the league table.

=== San Lorenzo ===
On 10 July 2013, Cauteruccio signed Argentine Primera División side San Lorenzo.

=== Cruz Azul ===
On 11 January 2017, Cauteruccio joined Liga MX side Cruz Azul on a 2-year deal.

=== Estudiantes ===
On 30 December 2019, Cauteruccio finalized a deal to return to the Argentine Primera División with Estudiantes, on a 18-month deal.

=== Aldosivi ===
On 25 June 2021, Cauteruccio rescinded his contract with Estudiantes to join rival Aldosivi on a 18-month deal.

=== Independiente ===
On 22 December 2022, Cauteruccio signed with Independiente on a 2-year deal, after rescinding his contract with Aldosivi.

== Career statistics ==
As of match played on 27 February 2024

Appearances and goals by club, season and competition
Club	Season	League			Cup		League Cup		Other		Total	
Club	Season	Division	Apps	Goals	Apps	Goals	Apps	Goals	Apps	Goals	Apps	Goals
Racing	2009–10	UPD	24	12	0	0	—		7	2	31	14
Nacional	2010–11	UPD	13	3	0	0	—				13	3
Quilmes	2010–11	APD	18	5	0	0	—				18	5
Quilmes	2011–12	Primera B Nacional	37	13	1	1	—				38	14
Quilmes	2012–13	APD	36	14	2	2	—				38	16
Quilmes	Total		91	32	3	3	0	0	0	0	94	35
San Lorenzo	2013–14	APD	8	5	2	2	—		2	0	12	7
San Lorenzo	2014	APD	18	3	0	0	—		4	0	22	3
San Lorenzo	2015358	APD	26	10	4	4	—		7	1	37	15
San Lorenzo	2016	APD	15	2	4	2	—		10	3	29	7
San Lorenzo	2016–17	APD	11	9	0	0	—		5	1	16	10
San Lorenzo	Total		78	29	10	8	—		28	5	116	42
Cruz Azul	2016–17	Liga MX	10	1	6	4	—				16	5
Cruz Azul	2017–18	Liga MX	31	5	6	2	—				37	7
Cruz Azul	2018–19	Liga MX	39	5	11	6	—				50	11
Cruz Azul	2019–20	Liga MX	3	0	0	0	—				3	0
Cruz Azul	Total		83	11	23	12	0	0	—		106	24
Estudiantes	2019–20	APD	4	2	0	0	0	0	—		4	2
Estudiantes	2020–21	APD	8	1	0	0	1	0	—		9	1
Estudiantes	2021	APD	12	3	0	0	0	0	—		12	3
Estudiantes	Total		24	6	0	0	1	0	—		25	6
Aldosivi	2021	APD	23	10	0	0	0	0	—		23	10
Aldosivi	2022	APD	29	15	0	0	0	0	—		29	15
Aldosivi	Total		52	25	0	0	0	0	—		52	25
Independiente	2023	APD	35	11	3	1	0	0	—		38	12
Sporting Cristal	2024	Liga 1	5	13	0	0	0	0	2	4	7	17
Career totals			405	142	38	24	1	0	37	11	481	177

== Honours ==
San Lorenzo

- Argentine Primera División: 2013 Inicial
- Copa Libertadores: 2014
- Supercopa Argentina: 2015

Cruz Azul

- Copa MX: Apertura 2018
- Supercopa MX: 2019
- Leagues Cup: 2019

Individual

- Copa MX Top Scorer: Apertura 2018
