= Misael Domínguez =

Mexican footballer (born 1999)

Personal information
- Full name: Josué Misael Domínguez González
- Date of birth: 27 October 1999 (age 27)
- Place of birth: Saltillo, Coahuila, Mexico
- Height: 1.62 m (5 ft 4 in)
- Positions: Winger; attacking midfielder

Team information
- Current team: Atlético Morelia
- Number: 10

Youth career
- 2011–2017: Monterrey

Senior career*
Years	Team	Apps	(Gls)
2016–2018	Monterrey	8	(0)
2018–2019	→ Cruz Azul (loan)	8	(0)
2019–2021	Cruz Azul	25	(0)
2021–2023	Tijuana	27	(0)
2023–2024	Necaxa	5	(0)
2024	→ Querétaro (loan)	3	(0)
2025–	Atlético Morelia	39	(1)

International career
2018–2019	Mexico U20	10	(1)
- * Club domestic league appearances and goals as of 21 September 2026

Josué Misael Domínguez González (born 27 October 1999) is a Mexican professional footballer who plays as a winger for Liga de Expansión MX club Atlético Morelia.

== Club career ==
=== Monterrey ===
Born in Saltillo, Dominguez began playing professional football with C.F. Monterrey, where he participated in the 2016–17 CONCACAF Champions League group stage against Don Bosco FC. Domínguez was loaned out to Cruz Azul in July for the rest of the year. On July 21, 2018, Dominguez debuted for Cruz Azul coming in as a substitute. At the 93rd minute, Dominguez assisted Elías Hernández in the 3rd goal in a 3–0 victory against Puebla.

=== Cruz Azul ===
Cruz Azul signed him permanently after the loan deal expired, for US$1.5 million.

== International career ==
On 25 October 2018, Domínguez was called up by Diego Ramírez to participate in that year's CONCACAF U-20 Championship. As Mexico would go on and finish runner-up in the tournament. In April 2019, Domínguez was included in the 21-player squad to represent Mexico at the U-20 World Cup in Poland.

== Career statistics ==
=== Club ===
As of match played 30 July 2023

Club	Season	League			Cup		Continental		Other		Total	
Club	Season	Division	Apps	Goals	Apps	Goals	Apps	Goals	Apps	Goals	Apps	Goals
Monterrey	2016–17	Liga MX	1	0	—		2 (Note: Appearances in CONCACAF Champions League)	1	—		3	1
Monterrey	2017–18	Liga MX	7	0	3	0	—		—		10	0
Monterrey	Total		8	0	3	0	2	1	—		13	1
Cruz Azul (loan)	2018–19	Liga MX	8	0	11	1	—		—		19	1
Cruz Azul	2019–20	Liga MX	8	0	—		2	0	—		10	0
Cruz Azul	2020–21	Liga MX	17	0	—		1	0	—		18	0
Cruz Azul	Total		25	0	—		3	0	—		28	0
Tijuana	2021–22	Liga MX	17	0	—		—		—		17	0
Tijuana	2022–23	Liga MX	10	0	—		—		—		10	0
Tijuana	Total		27	0	—		—		—		27	0
Necaxa	2023–24	Liga MX	5	0	—		—		1 (Note: Appearance in Leagues Cup)	0	6	0
Career total			73	0	14	1	5	1	1	0	93	2

== Honours ==
Cruz Azul

- Liga MX: Guardianes 2021
- Copa MX: Apertura 2018
- Supercopa MX: 2019
- Leagues Cup: 2019
