= Guillermo Allison =

Mexican footballer (born 1990)

Personal information
- Full name: Guillermo Allison Revuelta
- Date of birth: 25 September 1990 (age 36)
- Place of birth: Tuxtla Gutiérrez, Chiapas, Mexico
- Height: 1.90 m (6 ft 3 in)
- Position: Goalkeeper

Team information
- Current team: Querétaro
- Number: 25

Youth career
- 2007–2013: Cruz Azul

Senior career*
Years	Team	Apps	(Gls)
2013–2022	Cruz Azul	16	(0)
2020–2021	→ Cancún (loan)	29	(0)
2021–2022	→ Celaya (loan)	38	(0)
2022–2023	Celaya	44	(0)
2023–	Querétaro	84	(0)
- * Club domestic league appearances and goals as of 14 November 2026

Guillermo Allison Revuelta (born 25 September 1990) is a Mexican professional footballer who plays as a goalkeeper for Liga MX club Querétaro. His debut for Cruz Azul in the Liga MX was in a game against Toluca where he blocked the penalty in the last play of the game which gave Cruz Azul the win, 2–1.

== Career statistics ==
=== Club ===
As of match played on 14 November 2026

Club	Season	League			Cup (Note: Includes Copa MX)		Continental		Other		Total	
Club	Season	Division	Apps	Goals	Apps	Goals	Apps	Goals	Apps	Goals	Apps	Goals
Cruz Azul	2012–13	Liga MX	—		3	0	—		—		3	0
Cruz Azul	2013–14	Liga MX	6	0	—		4 (Note: Appearances in CONCACAF Champions Cup)	0	—		10	0
Cruz Azul	2014–15	Liga MX	1	0	—		—		—		1	0
Cruz Azul	2015–16	Liga MX	6	0	9	0	—		—		15	0
Cruz Azul	2016–17	Liga MX	1	0	9	0	—		—		10	0
Cruz Azul	2017–18	Liga MX	1	0	9	0	—		—		10	0
Cruz Azul	2018–19	Liga MX	1	0	11	0	—		—		12	0
Cruz Azul	2019–20	Liga MX	—		—		1	0	—		1	0
Cruz Azul	2020–21	Liga MX	—		1 (Note: Appearance in Copa GNP por México)	0	—		—		1	0
Cruz Azul	Total		16	0	42	0	5	0	—		63	0
Cancún (loan)	2020–21	Liga de Expansión MX	29	0	—		—		—		29	0
Celaya (loan)	2021–22	Liga de Expansión MX	38	0	—		—		—		38	0
Celaya	2022–23	Liga de Expansión MX	44	0	—		—		—		44	0
Querétaro	2023–24	Liga MX	21	0	—		—		—		21	0
Querétaro	2024–25	Liga MX	25	0	—		—		2 (Note: Appearances in Leagues Cup)	0	27	0
Querétaro	2025–26	Liga MX	22	0	—		—		2	0	24	0
Querétaro	2026–27	Liga MX	16	0	—		—		2	0	18	0
Querétaro	Total		84	0	—		—		6	0	90	0
Career total			211	0	42	0	5	0	6	0	264	0

== Honours ==
Cruz Azul

- Copa MX: Apertura 2018
- Supercopa MX: 2019
- Leagues Cup: 2019
