= Hélder Baptista =

Portuguese footballer (born 1972)

Personal information
- Full name: Hélder Manuel Elias Domingos Baptista
- Date of birth: 18 February 1972 (age 54)
- Place of birth: Torres Vedras, Portugal
- Height: 1.74 m (5 ft 9 in)
- Position: Defensive midfielder

Youth career
- 1986–1991: Torreense

Senior career*
Years	Team	Apps	(Gls)
1991–1992	Torreense	13	(1)
1992–1993	Farense	23	(0)
1993–1994	Torreense	20	(4)
1994–1995	Braga	32	(1)
1995–1999	Boavista	98	(4)
1999	Paris Saint-Germain	5	(0)
1999–2005	Rayo Vallecano	101	(2)
2005–2006	Torreense	19	(2)
Total		311	(14)

International career
1992–1993	Portugal U21	6	(0)

Managerial career
- 2011: União Leiria (assistant)
- 2011–2012: Nacional (assistant)
- 2013–2015: Santos Laguna (assistant)
- 2015–2017: Al-Gharafa (assistant)
- 2017: Rangers (assistant)
- 2018–2019: Cruz Azul (assistant)
- * Club domestic league appearances and goals

Hélder Manuel Elias Domingos Baptista (born 18 February 1972) is a Portuguese former professional footballer who played as a defensive midfielder.

He amassed Primeira Liga totals of 166 matches and six goals over seven seasons, mainly with Boavista. He also spent several years in Spain, with Rayo Vallecano.

After retiring, Baptista went on to work as an assistant manager.

== Club career ==
Born in Torres Vedras, Lisbon District, Baptista made his senior – and Primeira Liga – debut in the 1991–92 season, appearing sparingly as local club S.C.U. Torreense was relegated after finishing third bottom. In the following six years, with the exception of 1993–94, spent with the same team, he continued to compete in the top flight, representing S.C. Farense, S.C. Braga and Boavista FC; he played his first game in the UEFA Cup with the latter side, featuring the full 90 minutes in a 3–2 away win against Odense Boldklub on 10 September 1996.

In January 1999, Baptista signed with Paris Saint-Germain FC in the Ligue 1, but the following transfer window he switched to the Spanish La Liga with Rayo Vallecano, his first match in the latter competition taking place on 22 August when he came as a 73rd-minute substitute for Luis Cembranos in the 2–0 victory at Atlético Madrid, and his maiden goal occurring on 5 December in a 3–2 away loss to Deportivo de La Coruña.

Baptista contributed nine appearances (eight starts) in Rayo's quarter-final run in the 2000–01 UEFA Cup, but from 2002 to 2004 he also saw the club drop two consecutive levels. He retired in 2006 at the age of 33, after one year in the Portuguese third tier with Torreense.

== International career ==
Baptista earned six caps for Portugal at under-21 level in one year. His last appearance was a 2–1 win over Scotland in the 1994 UEFA European Championship qualifiers on 27 April 1993, where he played as a substitute.

== Coaching career ==
Baptista started working as a coach in 2011, joining Pedro Caixinha's staff at U.D. Leiria. He continued to work under the latter in the following years, at C.D. Nacional, Mexico's Santos Laguna and Al-Gharafa SC from Qatar.

In March 2017, both Caixinha and Baptista joined Scottish club Rangers. On 26 October, they left.
