= Rafael Baca =

Mexican footballer (born 1989)

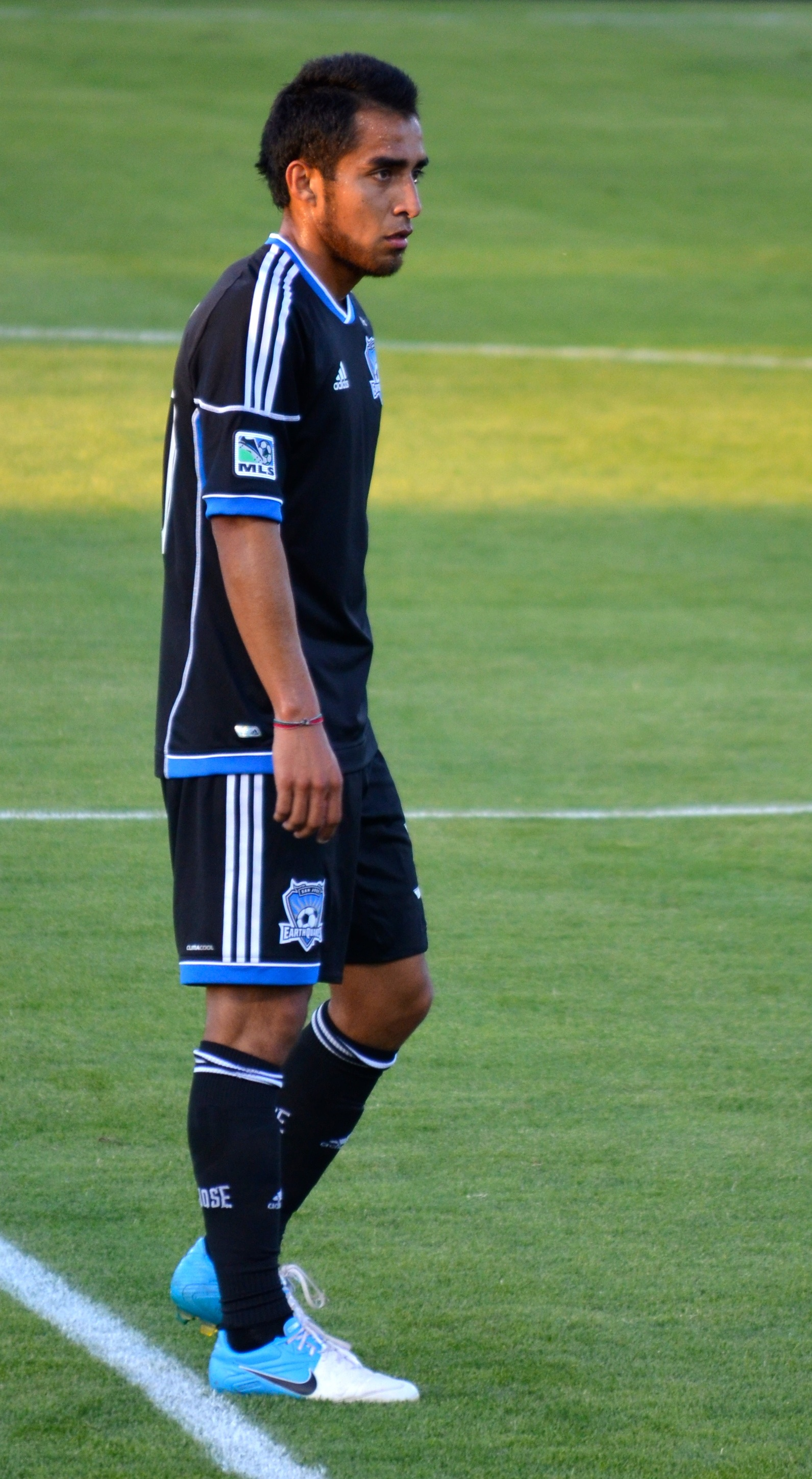
- Baca with the San Jose Earthquakes in 2012

Personal information
- Full name: Rafael Baca Miranda
- Date of birth: 11 September 1989 (age 37)
- Place of birth: Tuxpan, Michoacán, Mexico
- Height: 5 ft 8 in (1.73 m)
- Position: Defensive midfielder

College career
Years	Team	Apps	(Gls)
2007–2010	Loyola Marymount Lions	79	(19)

Senior career*
Years	Team	Apps	(Gls)
2011–2013	San Jose Earthquakes	79	(2)
2014–2023	Cruz Azul	265	(8)
2023–2024	Monterey Bay FC	31	(2)
2024–	Oakland Roots SC	6	(0)
- * Club domestic league appearances and goals as of 03:22, 31 October 2024 (UTC)

Rafael Baca Miranda (born 11 September 1989) is a Mexican professional footballer who plays as a defensive midfielder for Oakland Roots SC in the USL Championship. His past clubs include San Jose Earthquakes, Cruz Azul, and Monterey Bay FC.

== Career ==
=== Early career ===
Born in Tuxpan, near Morelia, Baca moved to California at the age of 7, and graduated from Ánimo Leadership Charter High School in Inglewood in 2007. While there he scored a total of 58 goals and received the Athlete Academic Award. Baca attended Loyola Marymount University (2007–2010), where he was a star player for the team. LMU won their first conference championship in school history in 2010 during Baca's junior season, in which Baca was named to the thirty player watch list for the Hermann Trophy. Baca captained the Lions in his final three seasons, and was named First-Team All-West Coast Conference those three seasons as well. A member of the LA Galaxy academy program while at LMU, Baca was not offered an opportunity with the club after he had graduated.

=== San Jose Earthquakes ===
Baca was not selected in either of the year's two drafts, but on July 8, 2011, Baca signed a Major League Soccer contract with the San Jose Earthquakes, with whom he had been training since February. While attending the funeral of college teammate David Kucera, he met Quakes assistant coach Ian Russell, and the club held a tryout for him the next day. Baca made his debut on July 9 against Philadelphia, receiving 10 minutes off the bench. After replacing Simon Dawkins in the first half against Vancouver on July 20, Baca was given his full debut by head coach Frank Yallop three days later in a 4–0 loss to Real Salt Lake. Baca started the club's final ten games of the season as they looked to sneak into the playoffs. San Jose won three of their final ten games, finishing 11 points and two places outside the playoffs. Baca finished the season with 15 appearances and 3 assists to his name, and scored his first professional goal on the final day of the season in a 4–2 win over Dallas. Baca initially took an international roster slot until his acquisition of a green card the following season.

Baca was a key component of San Jose's midfield in the 2012 season, as the club won the Supporters' Shield for the second time in their history. After starting on Opening Day against New England, Baca was replaced by Marvin Chávez at the half of their second game, a 1–0 loss to Houston on March 17. He returned to the starting lineup on March 30 against Seattle, and missed just one game the rest of the season, although he didn't play the full 90 minutes in 15 of his final 30 appearances. He would form a partnership with Sam Cronin in the center of midfield, and was compared to former Quakes midfielder Ronnie Ekelund of the club's two MLS Cup winning seasons by assistant coach Russell, who also praised his technical skill. Head coach Yallop would praise his energy and work rate during the season, as well as his "will to do all the dirty work". Baca played the entire first leg of the Western Conference semifinals, a 1–0 win against defending champions LA Galaxy, but was replaced in the second half of the second leg by Shea Salinas after the Quakes conceded three first half goals to Los Angeles. San Jose would eventually be eliminated 3–2 on aggregate.

Baca started the club's first ten games of the 2013 season, and after being replaced with an apparent injury in the first half by Adam Jahn on May 18 against Colorado, Baca was left out of the starting lineup for the next two games. After the team had let in three goals in the first half against Real Salt Lake on June 1, Baca entered as part of a double substitution in the eventual 3–0 defeat in what would be head coach Yallop's final game in charge. Baca started three of San Jose's four games in their CONCACAF Champions League group, which saw the club advance past Montreal and Guatemalan side Heredia on goal difference, as all three sides finished on six points. Baca received his first red card as a professional on September 8 against Philadelphia for a late challenge on Conor Casey. This would result in his second suspension of the season, having also missed the club's previous game against LA Galaxy for yellow card accumulation. All told, Baca made 31 appearances in the league for San Jose in what would be his final season in MLS before departing for Mexico.

=== Cruz Azul ===
Baca was reported to have been signed by Cruz Azul of Liga MX on December 22, 2013, and he moved to the Mexican side when the transfer window opened on January 1, 2014. His new club also participating the championship stage of the CONCACAF Champions League, Baca wasn't able to ease into the side in the Copa MX, as clubs participating in international competition did not compete in the Clausura 2014 Copa MX. Baca had to wait until the penultimate day of the season to make his debut, replacing Sergio Nápoles in the second half of a 5–1 defeat to Morelia. He made his full debut the following weekend against UNAM, but lasted just 55 minutes as he was replaced by Rogelio Chávez. Baca also played in seven games for the club's second team, Cruz Azul Hidalgo, playing in Ascenso MX. Finishing as champions of the regular season, Cruz Azul crashed out in the Liguilla to 8th placed León on the away goals rule, and Baca did not make the squad in either game. Baca did not feature in the 2014 Apertura, and Cruz Azul's lack of involvement in the Apertura 2014 Copa MX combined with Hidalgo's place in the Ascenso being bought out by Zacatepec meant that Baca received no professional game time in the first half of the season. Baca was named to two squads by manager Luis Fernando Tena in Cruz Azul's CONCACAF Champions League group stage campaign, but did not feature as Cruz Azul did not advance.

Baca broke into the side during the 2015 Clausura tournament, missing only two games after sustaining an injury against Puebla on January 31. A loss to U. de G. on the last day of the season meant that Cruz Azul missed out on the Liguilla, in 9th place on goal difference. Tena was replaced by former Chiapas manager Sergio Bueno before the start of the 2015 Apertura, and Baca did not receive his first start until August 21 against Querétaro, after five games starting on the bench. He would receive two more starts in the tournament, including Bueno's final game in charge, a 2–1 defeat to Puebla on September 27. Tomás Boy was appointed manager on October 2, and Baca was limited to four substitute appearances in the final six games of the Apertura under Boy. Baca did score his first goal for Cruz Azul in a 2–1 win over Pachuca on November 14. Baca was part of Boy's plans for the 2016 Clausura, starting every match in the midfield and failing to complete the full match just once.

Baca was replaced by summer signing Jonatan Cristaldo at the half in Cruz Azul's goalless draw with UNAM, and he missed the next two matches as Boy had to manage the club's foreign players with the new 10/8 rule going into effect. Baca was considered a foreign player by the FMF as he was not registered to play football in the country before the age of 18, although Baca was considered a domestic player for the 2017 Apertura following an appeal. Baca finished the 2016 Apertura with 15 starts, playing the entire game in 11. Boy was sacked during the Apertura, and Spanish coach Paco Jémez took charge for the Clausura. Baca received 16 starts during the campaign, and he started every game in the 2017 Apertura, as Cruz Azul qualified for their first Liguilla since the 2014 Clausura. Baca started both quarterfinal matches against América, both of which ended as goalless draws as América advanced due to their better placing in the regular season.

After the Apertura, Jémez did not renew his contract, and he was replaced by Portuguese coach Pedro Caixinha. Baca started all but one match in the 2018 Clausura due to a suspension he picked up after being sent off against Atlas on February 2. Baca received 14 starts in the 2018 Apertura, including starting the first 10 until he picked up a knock against Atlas on September 22. Baca also made four appearances in Cruz Azul's Apertura 2018 Copa MX conquest, although he did not appear in the 2–0 final win over Monterrey. Cruz Azul finished in first place in the regular season, and advanced past Querétaro and Monterrey in the playoffs, setting up a final with rivals América. Baca started the first three matches, but was replaced by Javier Salas in the midfield for the second leg against Monterrey. Salas also started both legs against América, as Baca did not come off the bench in the final leg, a 2–0 defeat at the Estadio Azteca after the first leg ended scoreless.

=== Monterey Bay ===
Rafael Baca was announced as a signing for USL Championship club Monterey Bay FC on July 27, 2023. He was reunited with former San Jose Earthquakes manager Frank Yallop who is now Monterey Bay's manager, as well as former San Jose teammates Ramiro Corrales and Simon Dawkins who are with Monterey Bay as an assistant coach and midfielder respectively.

== Honours ==
San Jose Earthquakes

- Supporters' Shield: 2012

Cruz Azul

- Liga MX: Guardianes 2021
- Copa MX: Apertura 2018
- Campeón de Campeones: 2021
- Supercopa de la Liga MX: 2022
- Supercopa MX: 2019
- Leagues Cup: 2019
