= Antonio Santos Sánchez =

Mexican footballer (born 1998)

Personal information
- Full name: Antonio Santos Sánchez Saavedra
- Date of birth: 19 September 1998 (age 28)
- Place of birth: Guadalajara, Jalisco, Mexico
- Height: 1.81 m (5 ft 11 in)
- Position: Left-back

Team information
- Current team: Zacatepec
- Number: 19

Youth career
- 2013–2016: UdeG

Senior career*
Years	Team	Apps	(Gls)
2016–2017	Cachorros UdeG	23	(2)
2017–2018	UdeG	26	(1)
2018–2021	Cruz Azul	0	(0)
2019–2020	→ Oaxaca (loan)	0	(0)
2020	→ UdeG (loan)	5	(1)
2020–2021	→ Cruz Azul Hidalgo (loan)	22	(3)
2021	→ Cancún (loan)	12	(0)
2022–2023	Zacatecas	12	(0)
2023–2024	Cafetaleros de Chiapas	14	(0)
2024–2025	Los Cabos United	28	(1)
2025–	Zacatepec	1	(0)
- * Club domestic league appearances and goals as of 25 August 2025

Antonio Santos Sánchez Saavedra (Note: In this Spanish name, the first or paternal surname is Sánchez and the second or maternal family name is Saavedra.) (born 19 September 1998) is a Mexican professional footballer who plays as a left-back for Zacatepec.

== Honours ==
Cruz Azul

- Copa MX: Apertura 2018
