= 2019 Supercopa MX =

- Event: 2019 Supercopa MX
Cruz Azul	Necaxa
4	0
- Date: 14 July 2019
- Venue: Dignity Health Sports Park, Carson, California, United States
- Referee: Diego Montaño Robles (Jalisco)
- Attendance: 21,000

The 2019 Supercopa MX was a Mexican football match-up played on 14 July 2019, and is the most-recent edition of the Supercopa MX. It was contested by the champions of the Apertura 2018 Copa MX, Cruz Azul, and the champions of the 2018 Supercopa MX, Necaxa, due to the Clausura 2019 Copa MX champion América competing in the 2019 Campeón de Campeones. Like the previous four editions, the 2019 Supercopa MX was contested in a single-leg format at a neutral venue in the United States. This match took place at the Dignity Health Sports Park in Carson, California for the fourth consecutive year.

The 2019 Supercopa MX was part of a doubleheader, which also included the 2019 Campeón de Campeones, organized by Univision Deportes, Soccer United Marketing (SUM), Liga MX, and LA Galaxy.

== Match details ==
14 July 2019
15:00 (UTC−08:00)

Cruz Azul	4–0	Necaxa
Caraglio 20'; Hernández 44'; Édgar 47'; Escobar 87'	Report

Dignity Health Sports Park, Carson
Attendance: 21,000
Referee: Diego Montaño Robles (Jalisco)

Cruz Azul	Necaxa

GK	1	(Mexico) José de Jesús Corona (c)
DF	16	(Mexico) Adrián Aldrete
DF	4	(Mexico) Julio César Domínguez
DF	23	(Paraguay) Pablo Aguilar
DF	24	(Paraguay) Juan Escobar
MF	19	(Peru) Yoshimar Yotún
MF	5	(Chile) Igor Lichnovsky
MF	11	(Mexico) Elías Hernández	(substituted off) 66'
MF	25	(Mexico) Roberto Alvarado	(substituted off) 87'
MF	17	(Spain) Édgar Méndez
FW	9	(Argentina) Milton Caraglio	(substituted off) 80'
Substitutions:
GK	12	(Mexico) Guillermo Allison
MF	10	(Argentina) Guillermo Fernández	(substituted on) 87'
MF	14	(Mexico) Misael Domínguez
MF	22	(Mexico) Rafael Baca
MF	31	(Mexico) Orbelín Pineda	(substituted on) 66'
FW	7	(Uruguay) Martín Cauteruccio
FW	13	(Uruguay) Jonathan Rodríguez	(substituted on) 80'
Manager:
(Portugal) Pedro Caixinha

GK	1	(Mexico) Hugo González
DF	26	(Mexico) Cristian Calderón
DF	4	(Mexico) Alexis Peña
DF	31	(United States) Ventura Alvarado (c)
DF	5	(Argentina) Fernando Meza
MF	6	(Mexico) Luis Ernesto Pérez	(substituted off) 65'
MF	188	(Mexico) José Plascencia	(substituted off) 69'
MF	11	(Ecuador) Kevin Mercado
MF	20	(Mexico) Jesús Angulo	(substituted off) 55'
MF	7	(Mexico) Daniel Álvarez
FW	21	(Mexico) Eduardo Herrera
Substitutions:
GK	25	(Mexico) Yosgart Gutiérrez
DF	24	(Argentina) Rodrigo Noya
MF	22	(Mexico) Ricardo Chávez	(substituted on) 65'
MF	35	(Mexico) José Cobián	(substituted on) 55'
MF	195	(Mexico) Fernando Illescas	(substituted on) 69'
FW	15	(Mexico) Pedro Campos
FW	189	(Mexico) Ricardo Monreal
Manager:
(Mexico) Guillermo Vázquez

Assistant referees:
Christian Kiabek Espinosa (Mexico City)
Andrés Hernández Delgado (Mexico City)
Fourth official:
Jorge Antonio Pérez (Veracruz)

== See also ==
- Apertura 2018 Copa MX
- Clausura 2019 Copa MX
