= Javier Salas (footballer) =

Mexican footballer (born 1993)

Personal information
- Full name: Javier Alván Salas Salazar
- Date of birth: 20 August 1993 (age 33)
- Place of birth: Culiacán, Sinaloa, Mexico
- Height: 1.83 m (6 ft 0 in)
- Position: Defensive midfielder

Youth career
- Sinaloa

Senior career*
Years	Team	Apps	(Gls)
2011–2016	Sinaloa	46	(1)
2014–2015	→ Tijuana (loan)	2	(0)
2016–2017	→ Atlas (loan)	31	(0)
2017	Atlas	15	(0)
2018–2019	Cruz Azul	38	(0)
2020–2022	Puebla	80	(0)
2022–2025	Juárez	55	(0)
2026	FBC Melgar	16	(1)
- * Club domestic league appearances and goals as of 2 July 2026

Javier Alván Salas Salazar (born 20 August 1993) is a Mexican professional footballer who plays as a defensive midfielder.

== Honours ==
Dorados de Sinaloa

- Copa MX: Apertura 2012

Cruz Azul

- Copa MX: Apertura 2018
- Leagues Cup: 2019

Individual

- Liga MX All-Star: 2021
