= Julio César Domínguez =

Mexican footballer (born 1987)

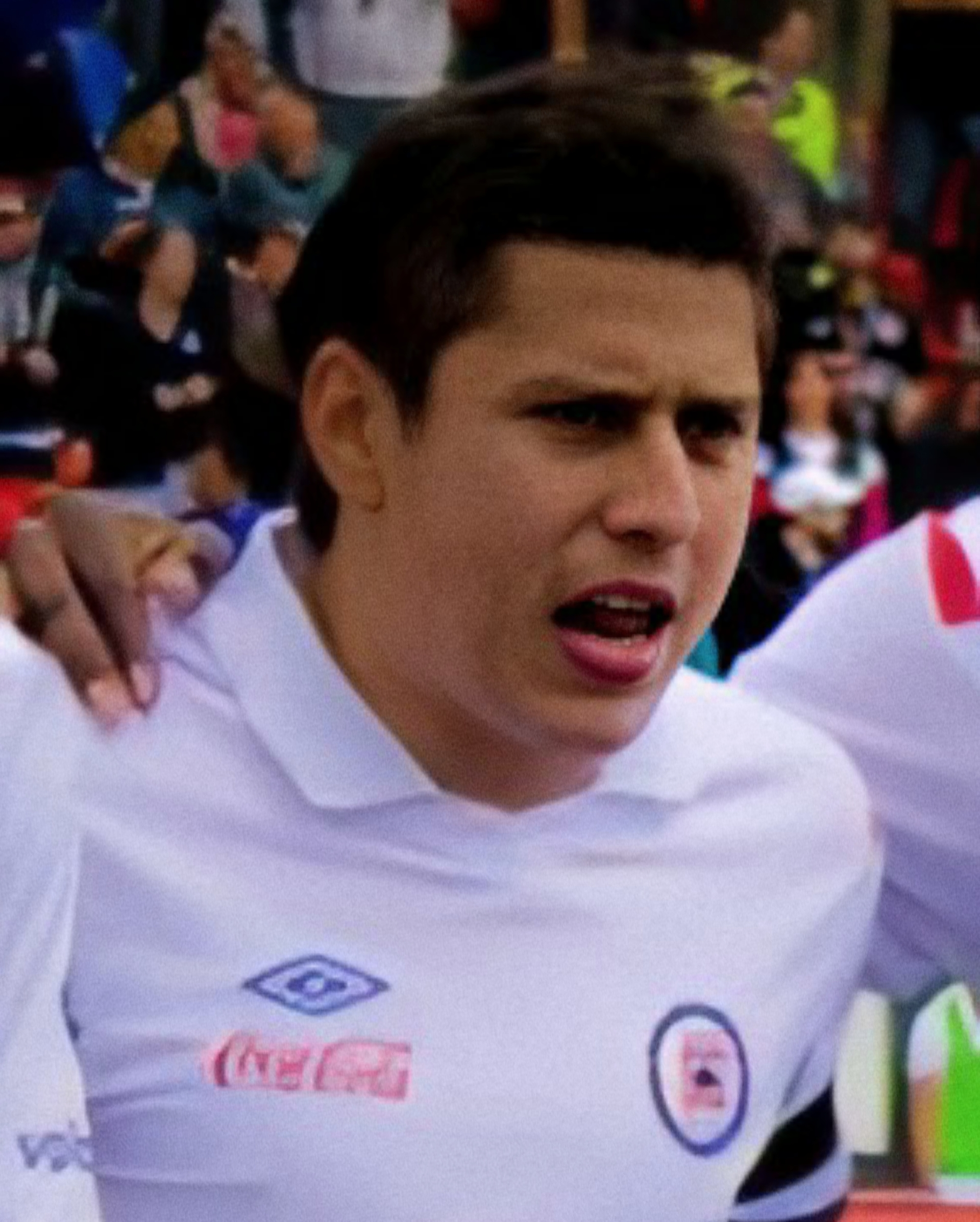
- Domínguez with Cruz Azul in 2012

Personal information
- Full name: Julio César Domínguez Juárez
- Date of birth: 8 November 1987 (age 38)
- Place of birth: Arriaga, Chiapas, Mexico
- Height: 1.75 m (5 ft 9 in)
- Position: Centre-back

Team information
- Current team: Cruz Azul U21 (assistant)

Youth career
- 2003–2006: Cruz Azul

Senior career*
Years	Team	Apps	(Gls)
2006–2023	Cruz Azul	560	(16)
2023–2026	Atlético San Luis	69	(2)

International career^{‡}
2007	Mexico U20	11	(0)
2006	Mexico U23	5	(0)
2007–2022	Mexico	24	(0)

Managerial career
- 2026–: Cruz Azul U21 (assistant)
- * Club domestic league appearances and goals as of 21 March 2026 ‡ National team caps and goals as of 14 June 2022

Julio César Domínguez Juárez (Note: In this Spanish name, the first or paternal surname is Domínguez and the second or maternal family name is Juárez.) (born 8 November 1987), sometimes known as Cata, is a Mexican former professional footballer who played as a centre-back. He is currently serving as assistant manager of the Cruz Azul U21 team.

Domínguez spent the majority of his career with Cruz Azul, where he holds the record for most appearances.

== Club career ==
=== Cruz Azul ===
Isaac Mizrahi, impressed by Domínguez's performance in Cruz Azul's reserve team, allocated him for the first team in the final fixture of Clausura 2006. At the age of 18, Domínguez made his debut on 29 April 2006 in a home match against Pachuca which resulted in a 3–2 win for Cruz Azul.

Domínguez scored his first and second league goals on 14 November 2007 against Pachuca during the Apertura 2007 repechage.

He remained with Cruz Azu for 20 years, having originally started as a pure centre-back. Domínguez has proven his versatility with performances as a right-back.

On 1 June 2023, Cruz Azul announced that they would not renew the player's contract. Domínguez left the club after 20 years.

=== Atlético San Luis ===
On 15 June 2023, Domínguez joined Atlético San Luis.

== International career ==
=== Youth ===
Domínguez first started with the under-20 national team. Domínguez was regarded as one of the brightest young defensive players that Mexico had.

=== Senior ===
Domínguez made his debut for the senior national team on 22 August 2007 in a friendly against Colombia. After a five-year absence from the national team, Mexico national team manager Miguel Herrera called him up for friendlies against the national football teams of Honduras and Panama in 2014. He would then be called up again against Netherlands and Belarus.

Domínguez was called up by Miguel Herrera for the 2015 Copa América, playing all 3 games against Ecuador, Chile and Bolivia.

Domínguez was called up again in 2018 during Ricardo Ferretti's interim of the national team but did not see any playing time.

== Career statistics ==
=== Club ===
As of match played 21 March 2026

Club	Season	League			Cup		Continental		Other		Total	
Club	Season	Division	Apps	Goals	Apps	Goals	Apps	Goals	Apps	Goals	Apps	Goals
Cruz Azul	2005–06	Mexican Primera División	2	0	—		—		—		2	0
Cruz Azul	2006–07	Mexican Primera División	32	0	2	0	—		—		34	0
Cruz Azul	2007–08	Mexican Primera División	35	0	3	0	—		—		38	0
Cruz Azul	2008–09	Mexican Primera División	37	3	—		9	0	—		46	3
Cruz Azul	2009–10	Mexican Primera División	30	1	—		6	0	—		36	1
Cruz Azul	2010–11	Mexican Primera División	24	1	—		9	0	—		33	1
Cruz Azul	2011–12	Mexican Primera División	29	0	—		1	0	—		30	0
Cruz Azul	2012–13	Liga MX	30	0	7	0	—		—		37	0
Cruz Azul	2013–14	Liga MX	35	1	—		10	1	—		45	2
Cruz Azul	2014–15	Liga MX	34	1	—		4	0	3	0	41	1
Cruz Azul	2015–16	Liga MX	29	2	5	0	—		—		34	2
Cruz Azul	2016–17	Liga MX	33	0	8	0	—		—		41	0
Cruz Azul	2017–18	Liga MX	33	2	6	0	—		—		39	2
Cruz Azul	2018–19	Liga MX	42	1	7	0	—		—		49	1
Cruz Azul	2019–20	Liga MX	27	2	—		2	0	4	0	33	2
Cruz Azul	2020–21	Liga MX	40	1	—		1	0	—		41	1
Cruz Azul	2021–22	Liga MX	35	0	—		5	0	2	0	42	0
Cruz Azul	2022–23	Liga MX	33	1	—		—		1	0	34	1
Cruz Azul	Total		560	16	38	0	47	1	10	0	655	17
Atlético San Luis	2023–24	Liga MX	37	2	—		—		2	0	39	2
Atlético San Luis	2024–25	Liga MX	25	0	—		—		2	0	27	0
Atlético San Luis	2025–26	Liga MX	7	0	—		—		1	0	8	0
Atlético San Luis	Total		69	2	—		—		5	0	74	2
Career total			629	18	38	0	47	1	15	0	729	19

=== International ===
As of match played 14 June 2022

National team	Year	Apps	Goals
Mexico	2007	3	0
Mexico	2009	2	0
Mexico	2014	3	0
Mexico	2015	8	0
Mexico	2018	2	0
Mexico	2021	4	0
Mexico	2022	2	0
Total		24	0

== Honours ==
Cruz Azul

- Liga MX: Guardianes 2021
- Copa MX: Clausura 2013, Apertura 2018
- Campeón de Campeones: 2021
- Supercopa de la Liga MX: 2022
- Supercopa MX: 2019
- CONCACAF Champions League: 2013–14
- Leagues Cup: 2019
