= Adrián Aldrete =

Mexican footballer (born 1988)

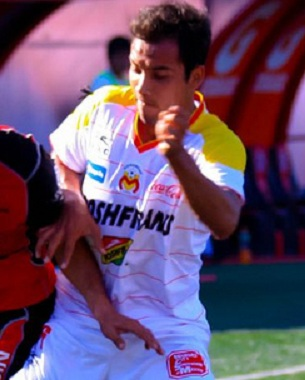
- Aldrete with Morelia in 2011

Personal information
- Full name: Adrián Alexei Aldrete Rodríguez
- Date of birth: 14 June 1988 (age 38)
- Place of birth: Guadalajara, Jalisco, Mexico
- Height: 1.77 m (5 ft 10 in)
- Position: Left-back

Youth career
- 2004–2006: Morelia

Senior career*
Years	Team	Apps	(Gls)
2005–2012	Morelia	183	(4)
2006	→ Dorados (loan)	7	(0)
2012–2014	América	65	(0)
2014–2016	Santos Laguna	53	(1)
2016–2022	Cruz Azul	180	(8)
2022–2024	UNAM	53	(2)

International career
2005	Mexico U17	5	(0)
2006	Mexico U23	3	(0)
2007	Mexico U20	8	(0)
2007–2016	Mexico	20	(0)
Medal record
Representing Mexico
Men's football
FIFA U-17 World Cup
Winner	2005 Peru
- * Club domestic league appearances and goals as of 10 December 2023

Adrián Alexei Aldrete Rodríguez (born 14 June 1988) is a Mexican former professional footballer who played as a left-back.

== Club career ==
=== Morelia ===
Born in Guadalajara, Jalisco, Aldrete began his football career with Monarcas Morelia as a defender and midfielder. During his time as a player in Morelia, Mexico U-17 coach Jesús Ramírez spotted young Aldrete and gave him a spot in the Mexico team in the 2005 FIFA U-17 World Cup, which Mexico would win. After his participation in the World Cup, he was loaned to Dorados de Sinaloa for the Clausura 2006 season because he was not used in the first team and he needed to "gain experience".

After his six-month loan to Dorados, Aldrete returned to Morelia and made his first appearance on 5 August 2006 under coach Hugo Hernández in a 0–2 defeat against Atlante. In that match, he played the entire match. Aldrete had been a regular starter for Monarcas Morelia.

In 2012 after making nearly 200 league appearances for Morelia, it was announced that Aldrete would be transferred to América in May 2012 for the Apertura 2012 season.

==== Dorados (loan) ====
Aldrete was loaned to Dorados de Sinaloa for the Clausura 2006 season. Aldrete made his professional debut as a footballer with Dorados, he made his debut 21 January 2006 at age 17 in a game against Atlante, which ended in a 0–0 draw. During his stint in Sinaloa, Adrian made seven league appearances, scoring an own goal against Monarcas Morelia, his parent club, in a match which ended in a 3–3 draw. He had little participation with the club and returned to Morelia after six months.

=== América ===
In May 2012, Aldrete transferred to América for the Apertura 2012 season. He made his debut with the club on 21 July 2012 in a league game against Monterrey. Aldrete won his first league championship with América after defeating cross-town rivals Cruz Azul in the final via a penalty shoot-out. He played 62 minutes until being substituted by Christian Bermúdez.

=== Cruz Azul ===
On 6 June 2016, it was announced that Aldrete would join Cruz Azul for the Apertura 2016 in the Liga MX.

=== Pumas UNAM ===
On 1 July 2022, it was announced that Aldrete would join UNAM for the Apertura 2022 in the Liga MX as free agent.

== International career ==
=== Youth ===
Aldrete was chosen by coach Jesús Ramírez to participate in the 2005 FIFA U-17 World Cup held in Peru. He played as a midfielder in the tournament rather than a defender, which was his natural position. He played the full 90 minutes in each tournament game, although he did not play in the match against Turkey. Aldrete did play the final against Brazil, beating them 3–0 and achieving for Mexico its first U-17 championship.

In 2007 Aldrete was chosen again by coach Jesús Ramírez to participate in the 2007 U-20 World Cup CONCACAF qualifying tournament, playing in all of the matches and Mexico qualified for the 2007 FIFA U-20 World Cup, which Aldrete also participated in. Mexico was eliminated in a quarter-final match against Argentina.

Aldrete participated in the 2006 Central American and Caribbean Games and was one of the youngest members on the team, being age 18. Mexico was eliminated in a quarter-final round match against Honduras.

== Career statistics ==
Mexico
Year	Apps	Goals
2007	1	0
2008	3	0
2010	3	0
2011	1	0
2012	1	0
2013	5	0
2014	1	0
2015	4	0
2016	1	0
Total	20	0

== Honours ==
Morelia

- SuperLiga: 2010

América

- Liga MX: Clausura 2013

Santos Laguna

- Liga MX: Clausura 2015
- Copa MX: Apertura 2014
- Campeón de Campeones: 2015

Cruz Azul

- Liga MX: Guardianes 2021
- Copa MX: Apertura 2018
- Supercopa MX: 2019
- Leagues Cup: 2019

Mexico U17

- FIFA U-17 World Championship: 2005

Individual

- Liga MX Best XI: Guardianes 2020
