= Milton Caraglio =

Argentine footballer

Personal information
- Full name: Milton Joel Caraglio Pérez
- Date of birth: 1 December 1988 (age 37)
- Place of birth: Rosario, Argentina
- Height: 1.87 m (6 ft 2 in)
- Position: Striker

Team information
- Current team: Central Córdoba

Youth career
- 2001–2006: Rosario Central

Senior career*
| Years | Team | Apps | (Gls) |
| 2007–2011 | Rosario Central | 49 | (11) |
| 2011 | → New England Revolution (loan) | 12 | (3) |
| 2012–2016 | Rangers | 37 | (16) |
| 2013 | → Pescara (loan) | 4 | (0) |
| 2013–2014 | → Arsenal de Sarandí (loan) | 30 | (7) |
| 2014–2015 | → Vélez Sarsfield (loan) | 44 | (8) |
| 2016 | Sinaloa | 14 | (6) |
| 2016–2017 | Tijuana | 39 | (8) |
| 2017–2018 | Atlas | 34 | (16) |
| 2018–2021 | Cruz Azul | 60 | (22) |
| 2021 | → Atlas (loan) | 20 | (1) |
| 2021–2022 | Rosario Central | 15 | (1) |
| 2022 | San Luis | 10 | (0) |
| 2023 | Venados | 16 | (1) |
| 2024– | Central Córdoba | | |
- * Club domestic league appearances and goals as of 20:08, 15 September 2022 (UTC)

Milton Joel Caraglio Pérez (born 1 December 1988) is an Argentine professional footballer who plays as a striker for Central Córdoba.

== Club career ==
=== Rosario Central ===
Caraglio started his football career at Rosario Central youth, being promoted to the first team in 2007. He made his professional on 17 March against San Lorenzo de Almagro in a 1–0 home defeat and scored his first goal against Huracán during the 2008 Apertura. In the following two seasons, the striker scored seven goals in 29 games.

In July 2010, Caraglio joined West Ham United on trial, making his debut on 28 July when he played for 64 minutes in a 2–0 win against MK Dons. However, he failed to pass the stringent medical that West Ham put him through and he returned to Argentina.

=== New England Revolution ===
On 2 August 2011, Caraglio completed a move to Major League Soccer side New England Revolution as the team's first ever designated player. Per MLS Soccer Players Union documentation, Caraglio's 2011 base salary was $54,000, though, under Designated Player rules, the Revolution's salary cap would be charged roughly $200,000 for their use of the spot. It is likely that the fees associated with his loan deal / transfer fee pushed his over-all compensation into qualification for Designated Player rule, which does allow for transfer fees to be built into a salary cap hit that can extend over several seasons.

Caraglio made his league debut on August 6, 2011, against Chivas USA in front of 11,523 fans at Gillette Stadium. The Revolution would lose 3–2, their 5th straight loss to Chivas, conceding a brace to Alejandro Moreno and an additional goal to Nick LaBrocca. The game is best remembered as the league debut of the Revolution's first homegrown player Diego Fagundez, who would additionally score his first MLS goal in the 86th minute.

Caraglio's first goal came as part of a brace at home against the New York Red Bulls on Saturday, August 20, 2011. Caraglio scored his first goal in the 15th minute, breaking past three defenders and corralling his own shot past Bouna Coundoul. His second goal would come 22 minutes later, when he headed in a Kenny Mansally set piece in the 37th minute. Despite Caraglio's heroics the Revolution would concede 2 second half goals to Dane Richards and draw 2-2.

Caraglio's final goal for the Revolution came on October 22, 2011, in the season finale at BMO Field against Toronto FC in front of 21,600 fans. Caraglio slid to connect with a Benny Feilhaber cross in the 46th minute, sending the ball past Miloš Kocić.

Though the option on Caraglio's contract was not picked up at the end of the season, a The Boston Globe article reported that Caraglio, as well as season stand-outs Rajko Lekić and Monsef Zerka, were all considering returning to the club with renegotiated contracts. Despite this statement, coming from coach Jay Heaps, Revolution fans would learn six days later that Caraglio had signed a contract with Rangers.

=== Rangers ===
After scoring three goals in 12 games with the New England Revolution, in December of the same year, he signed for Chilean Primera División club Rangers to play the 2012 Apertura Tournament. In Rangers the Argentine forward was the team's top scorer of the season, with 16 goals in 37 games. His success brought interest from Catania and Genoa in Italy, and also Racing in Argentina.

=== Loan to Pescara ===
On January 22, 2013, Caraglio moved to Italian Serie A side Pescara to play for former Pescara player Cristiano Bergodi. Caraglio would play under 3 managers at Pescara in his half season of service - Bergodi was soon sacked and replaced by Cristian Bucchi in March, and Caraglio would only make 3 appearances for the team, who finished in 20th place and were relegated to Serie B. In June 2013 Caraglio's loan would end, and Pasquale Marino would oversee the return of Caraglio to Rangers.

=== Loans to Arsenal de Sarand, Vélez Sarsfield ===
The striker played the 2013–14 Argentine Primera División season on loan for Arsenal de Sarandí, helping the team reach the quarterfinals of the 2014 Copa Libertadores. For the 2014–15 Argentine Primera División season, he was loaned from a third-party to Vélez Sarsfield for 18 months, with an option to buy of US$1,2 million. He debuted and scored his first goal for the team in the first fixture 1–0 win against Tigre. Caraglio scored the first two goals of the 2015 Argentine Primera División, in Vélez' 2–0 victory over Aldosivi.

=== Move to Dorados de Sinaloa ===
On January 23, 2016, after several loan spells, and a year and five months left on his contract, Caraglio left Rangers de Talca for Mexican Liga MX side Dorados de Sinaloa to play for Luis Fernando Suárez in the Liga MX Clausura. In the Toreno Clausura 2016 Caraglio finished 12 in scoring in the league, with six goals for his new club, making a total of 14 appearances.

=== Move to Tijuana ===
In July 2016, Caraglio moved to Tijuana to play for Miguel Herrera. He would wear the No. 9 jersey. Caraglio scored 6 goals in 23 appearances for Tijuana, finishing atop the Liga MX table In the Torneo Apertura 2016 Caraglio scored 3 goals for his new club and 5 goals in the Torneo Clausura 2017.

=== Atlas ===
Caraglio moved to Atlas prior to the 2017 Apertura. He would once again play for José Guadalupe Cruz, who briefly managed him during his tenure at Sinaloa. On July 22, 2017, he made his league debut scoring the second of three goals against Club Leon Caraglio did not find the scoresheet again until September 29, when he scored both goals in a 2–0 win over Veracruz. Milton managed to score another brace against low regarded CD Guadalajara bringing his goal tally to 7. Milton Caraglio would finish the 2017 Apertura season with 8 Goals. In his second season with Atlas Milton scored a total of 8 goals in the season being the team's top scorer.

=== Cruz Azul ===
In the summer of 2018 Milton Caraglio officially became a Cruz Azul player in Liga MX[9][10]. On July 21, 2018, Milton made his League debut with Cruz Azul and made his first goal with the team via penalty shot in the 90th minute. He scored the 10,000 goals in stadium Azteca.

=== San Luis de Quillota ===
In June 2022, he joined San Luis de Quillota in the Primera B de Chile.

== Career statistics ==
As of match played 28 April 2023.

Appearances and goals by club, season and competition
| Club | Season | League | | | Cup | | Continental | | Other | | Total | |
| Club | Season | Division | Apps | Goals | Apps | Goals | Apps | Goals | Apps | Goals | Apps | Goals |
|---|---|---|---|---|---|---|---|---|---|---|---|---|
| Rosario Central | 2008–09 | Argentine Primera División | 21 | 7 | 0 | 0 | — | | — | | 21 | 7 |
| Rosario Central | 2009–10 | Argentine Primera División | 16 | 4 | 0 | 0 | — | | — | | 16 | 4 |
| Rosario Central | Total | | 37 | 11 | 0 | 0 | — | | — | | 37 | 11 |
| New England Revolution | 2011 | Major League Soccer | 12 | 3 | 0 | 0 | — | | — | | 12 | 3 |
| Rangers de Talca | 2012 | Primera División of Chile | 37 | 16 | 7 | 1 | — | | — | | 44 | 17 |
| Pescara (loan) | 2012–13 | Serie A | 4 | 0 | 0 | 0 | — | | — | | 4 | 0 |
| Arsenal de Sarandí (loan) | 2012–13 | Argentine Primera División season | 0 | 0 | 2 | 1 | — | | — | | 2 | 1 |
| Arsenal de Sarandí (loan) | 2013–14 | Argentine Primera División season | 30 | 7 | 0 | 0 | 10 | 1 | 1 (Note: Appearance(s) in the Supercopa Argentina) | 0 | 41 | 8 |
| Arsenal de Sarandí (loan) | Total | | 30 | 7 | 2 | 1 | 10 | 1 | 1 | 0 | 43 | 9 |
| Vélez Sarsfield (loan) | 2014 | Argentine Primera División | 19 | 2 | 0 | 0 | — | | — | | 19 | 2 |
| Vélez Sarsfield (loan) | 2015 | Argentine Primera División | 25 | 6 | 3 | 4 | — | | 1 (Note: Appearance(s) in the Copa Libertadores play-off) | 0 | 29 | 10 |
| Vélez Sarsfield (loan) | Total | | 44 | 8 | 3 | 4 | — | | 1 | 0 | 48 | 12 |
| Dorados de Sinaloa | 2015–16 | Liga MX | 14 | 6 | 2 | 2 | — | | — | | 16 | 8 |
| Tijuana | 2016–17 | Liga MX | 39 | 8 | 4 | 0 | — | | — | | 43 | 8 |
| Atlas | 2017–18 | Liga MX | 34 | 16 | 4 | 1 | — | | — | | 38 | 17 |
| Cruz Azul | 2018–19 | Liga MX | 35 | 17 | 9 | 2 | — | | — | | 44 | 19 |
| Cruz Azul | 2019–20 | Liga MX | 15 | 5 | — | | — | | 1 (Note: Appearance(s) in the Supercopa MX) | 1 | 16 | 6 |
| Cruz Azul | 2020–21 | Liga MX | 10 | 0 | — | | 1 (Note: Appearance(s) in the CONCACAF Champions League) | 0 | — | | 11 | 0 |
| Cruz Azul | Total | | 60 | 22 | 9 | 2 | 1 | 0 | 1 | 1 | 71 | 25 |
| Atlas | 2020–21 | Liga MX | 20 | 1 | — | | — | | — | | 20 | 1 |
| Rosario Central | 2021 | Argentine Primera División | 7 | 1 | 0 | 0 | 2 (Note: Appearance(s) in the Copa Sudamericana) | 1 | — | | 9 | 1 |
| Rosario Central | 2022 | Argentine Primera División | 8 | 0 | 0 | 0 | — | | — | | 8 | 0 |
| Rosario Central | Total | | 15 | 1 | 0 | 0 | 2 | 1 | — | | 17 | 1 |
| San Luis | 2022 | Primera B de Chile | 10 | 0 | — | | — | | — | | 10 | 0 |
| Venados | 2022–23 | Liga de Expansión MX | 16 | 1 | — | | — | | — | | 16 | 1 |
| Career totals | | | 372 | 100 | 31 | 11 | 13 | 2 | 3 | 1 | 419 | 113 |

== International career ==
In May 2009, Caraglio was called by coach Diego Maradona for a national team formed exclusively with Argentine-based players, to play a friendly against Panama. However, a knee injury forced him to leave the squad, and Esteban Fuertes was chosen as his substitute in his stead.

== Honours ==
Cruz Azul

- Copa MX: Apertura 2018
- Supercopa MX: 2019
- Leagues Cup: 2019
