= José Madueña =

Mexican footballer (born 1990)

Personal information
- Full name: José Antonio Madueña López
- Date of birth: 29 May 1990 (age 36)
- Place of birth: Mexicali, Baja California, Mexico
- Height: 1.73 m (5 ft 8 in)
- Position: Right-back

Youth career
- 2009–2013: Tijuana

Senior career*
Years	Team	Apps	(Gls)
2009–2015	Tijuana	17	(0)
2013–2014	→ Sinaloa (loan)	19	(0)
2014–2015	→ América (loan)	5	(0)
2016–2017	Atlas	60	(3)
2018–2019	Cruz Azul	39	(1)
2020–2023	Guadalajara	5	(0)
2021	→ Juárez (loan)	3	(0)
2022	→ Tepatitlán (loan)	14	(0)
2022–2023	→ Querétaro (loan)	9	(0)
2023–2024	Mazatlán	24	(1)
- * Club domestic league appearances and goals as of 19 April 2024

José Antonio Madueña López (Note: In this Spanish name, the first or paternal surname is Madueña and the second or maternal family name is López.) (born 29 May 1990) is a Mexican professional footballer who plays as a right-back.

== Biography ==
Born in Mexicali, Baja California, Madueña began his career in the Tercera División de México and has worked his way through the systems teams of Ascenso MX teams before landing with Club América for the Apertura 2014. Related to Marthyn Diaz alias "El Perronzini".

== Professional ==
=== Tijuana ===
Madueña joined Tijuana for the Bicentenario 2010 when the team was part of the Ascenso MX. He was part of the team's U-20 squad as it ascended to the first division in 2011–2012 season. He first appeared with the first team in the Clausura 2012 while also representing the team in the Copa MX.

=== Sinaloa ===
For the Apertura 2014, José joined Dorados Sinaloa in the Ascenso MX playing twenty games with the team in league play and another three in the Copa MX.

=== America ===
America signed Madueña in June 2014. He has made one appearance with the U-20 squad and one with the first team in the Apertura 2014.

=== Guadalajara ===
On 4 December 2019, Madueña joined Liga MX side Guadalajara.

== Honours ==
Cruz Azul

- Copa MX: Apertura 2018
- Leagues Cup: 2019
