= 2019 Leagues Cup =

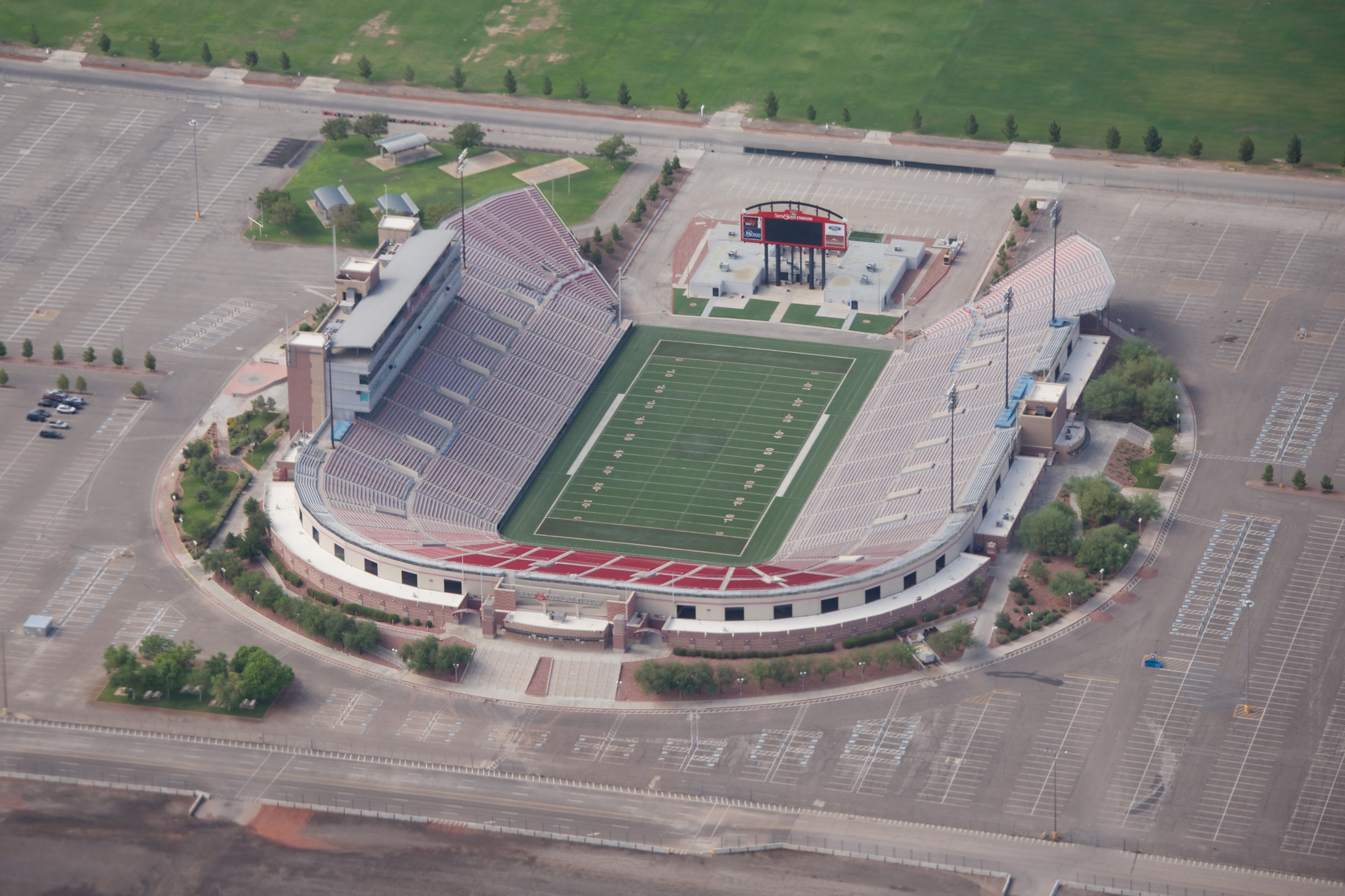
- Sam Boyd Stadium in Whitney, Nevada hosted the final

Tournament details
- Host country: United States
- Dates: July 23 – September 18
- Teams: 8 (from 2 associations)

Final positions
- Champions: (Mexico) Cruz Azul (1st title)
- Runners-up: (Mexico) Tigres UANL

Tournament statistics
- Matches played: 7
- Goals scored: 19 (2.71 per match)
- Attendance: 122,884 (17,555 per match)
- Top scorer(s): (Colombia) Andrés Ibargüen (2 goals)

The 2019 Leagues Cup was the inaugural edition of Leagues Cup, a club soccer competition featuring four clubs from Major League Soccer and Liga MX in an eight-team single-elimination tournament hosted in the United States. It began on July 23, 2019, with the first set of quarterfinals, and culminated in a final match played in Whitney, Nevada, near Las Vegas, on September 18, 2019. Cruz Azul won the final, defeating Tigres UANL 2–1.

== Qualification ==
The inaugural edition of the Leagues Cup featured eight teams—four invitees from Major League Soccer and four Liga MX clubs chosen based on competitive results.

== Teams ==
The following 8 teams (from two associations) participated in the tournament.

Association	Team
Mexico (4 teams)	América
Mexico (4 teams)	Cruz Azul
Mexico (4 teams)	Tigres UANL
Mexico (4 teams)	Tijuana
United States (4 teams)	Chicago Fire
United States (4 teams)	Houston Dynamo
United States (4 teams)	LA Galaxy
United States (4 teams)	Real Salt Lake

== Bracket ==
Quarterfinals
July 23 – Carson, CA
(United States) LA Galaxy (p)	2 (3)
(Mexico) Tijuana	2 (1)
July 23 – Bridgeview, IL
(United States) Chicago Fire	0
(Mexico) Cruz Azul	2
July 24 – Houston, TX
(United States) Houston Dynamo	1 (5)
(Mexico) América (p)	1 (6)
July 24 – Sandy, UT
(United States) Real Salt Lake	0
(Mexico) Tigres UANL	1

Semifinals
August 20 – Carson, CA
(United States) LA Galaxy	1
(Mexico) Cruz Azul	2
August 20 – Houston, TX
(Mexico) América	2 (3)
(Mexico) Tigres UANL (p)	2 (5)

Final
September 18 – Whitney, NV
(Mexico) Cruz Azul	2
(Mexico) Tigres UANL	1

=== Quarterfinals ===
July 23, 2019
19:30 CDT

Chicago Fire (United States)	0–2	(Mexico) Cruz Azul
	Report	Alvarado 43'; Hernández 90'

SeatGeek Stadium, Bridgeview, Illinois
Attendance: 14,213
Referee: Oshane Nation (Jamaica)

July 23, 2019
20:00 PDT

LA Galaxy (United States)	2–2	(Mexico) Tijuana
Boateng 27'; Romney 54'	Report	Nahuelpán 33'; Camacho 45'
Penalties
Carrasco (penalty scored); E. Álvarez (penalty missed); Cuello (penalty missed); Boateng (penalty scored); González (penalty scored)	3–1	(penalty missed) Torres; (penalty scored) Nahuelpán; (penalty missed) Braghieri; (penalty missed) Sepúlveda

Dignity Health Sports Park, Carson, California
Attendance: 10,421
Referee: Saíd Martínez (Honduras)

July 24, 2019
19:30 CDT

Houston Dynamo (United States)	1–1	(Mexico) América
Beasley 85'	Report	Benedetti 73'
Penalties
Quioto (penalty missed); Cerén (penalty scored); Elis (penalty scored); Cabezas (penalty scored); Bird (penalty scored); Garcia (penalty scored); Junqua (penalty missed)	5–6	(penalty scored) Castillo; (penalty scored) Aguilera; (penalty scored) Uribe; (penalty scored) Ibargüen; (penalty missed) Martínez; (penalty scored) Benedetti; (penalty scored) Dos Santos

BBVA Stadium, Houston, Texas
Attendance: 20,315
Referee: Walter López (Guatemala)

July 24, 2019
20:30 MDT

Real Salt Lake (United States)	0–1	(Mexico) Tigres UANL
	Report	Vargas 57'

Rio Tinto Stadium, Sandy, Utah
Attendance: 15,136
Referee: John Pitti (Panama)

=== Semifinals ===
August 20, 2019
19:30 CDT

América (Mexico)	2–2	(Mexico) Tigres UANL
Ibargüen 36' (pen.), 83'	Report	Aguilar 14' (o.g.); Valdez 90+5' (o.g.)
Penalties
Rodríguez (penalty scored); Valdez (penalty scored); López (penalty missed); Aguilar (penalty scored)	3–5	(penalty scored) Gignac; (penalty scored) Valencia; (penalty scored) L. Quiñones; (penalty scored) Rodríguez; (penalty scored) Salcedo

BBVA Stadium, Houston, Texas
Attendance: 22,532
Referee: Diego Montaño Robles (Mexico)

August 20, 2019
19:30 PDT

LA Galaxy (United States)	1–2	(Mexico) Cruz Azul
Cuello 37'	Report	Madueña 4'; Pineda 47'

Dignity Health Sports Park, Carson, California
Attendance: 20,135
Referee: Mario Escobar (Guatemala)

=== Final ===
September 18, 2019
19:30 PDT

Cruz Azul (Mexico)	2–1	(Mexico) Tigres UANL
Yotún 73' (pen.); Rodríguez 75'	Report	Pizarro 90'

Sam Boyd Stadium, Whitney, Nevada
Attendance: 20,132
Referee: Marco Ortíz (Mexico)

Team details

Cruz Azul
Tigres UANL

GK	1	(Mexico) José de Jesús Corona	(yellow card) 30'
DF	4	(Mexico) Julio César Domínguez
DF	23	(Paraguay) Pablo Aguilar
DF	5	(Chile) Igor Lichnovsky	(yellow card) 23'
DF	16	(Mexico) Adrián Aldrete
MF	25	(Mexico) Roberto Alvarado		(substituted off) 68'
MF	22	(Mexico) Rafael Baca
MF	31	(Mexico) Orbelín Pineda
MF	19	(Peru) Yoshimar Yotún
MF	21	(Uruguay) Jonathan Rodríguez	(yellow card) 30'	(substituted off) 87'
FW	9	(Argentina) Milton Caraglio		(substituted off) 89'
Substitutes:
MF	11	(Mexico) Elías Hernández		(substituted on) 68'
FW	13	(Ecuador) Bryan Angulo		(substituted on) 89'
MF	17	(Spain) Édgar Méndez	(yellow card) 90+4'	(substituted on) 87'
Manager:
(Uruguay) Robert Siboldi

GK	1	(Argentina) Nahuel Guzmán	(red card) 90+8'
DF	29	(Mexico) Jesús Dueñas	(yellow card) 37'
DF	4	(Mexico) Hugo Ayala
DF	18	(Mexico) Diego Reyes		(substituted off) 74'
DF	6	(Mexico) Jorge Torres Nilo
MF	23	(Colombia) Luis Quiñones		(substituted off) 85'
MF	19	(Argentina) Guido Pizarro
MF	8	(Argentina) Lucas Zelarayán		(substituted off) 62'
MF	5	(Brazil) Rafael Carioca	(yellow card) 30'
MF	20	(Mexico) Javier Aquino
FW	10	(France) André-Pierre Gignac
Substitutes:
FW	9	(Chile) Eduardo Vargas		(substituted on) 62'
MF	22	(Mexico) Jürgen Damm		(substituted on) 85'
DF	28	(Mexico) Luis Rodríguez		(substituted on) 74'
Manager:
(Brazil) Ricardo Ferretti

== Top goalscorers ==
Club eliminated for this round.

Rank	Player	Club	Goals	By round		
Rank	Player	Club	Goals	QF	SF	F
1	(Colombia) Andrés Ibargüen	(Mexico) América	2		2	
2	(Mexico) Roberto Alvarado	(Mexico) Cruz Azul	1	1		
2	(United States) DaMarcus Beasley	(United States) Houston Dynamo	1	1		
2	(Colombia) Nicolás Benedetti	(Mexico) América	1	1		
2	(Ghana) Emmanuel Boateng	(United States) LA Galaxy	1	1		
2	(Uruguay) Washington Camacho	(Mexico) Tijuana	1	1		
2	(Argentina) Emil Cuello	(United States) LA Galaxy	1		1	
2	(Mexico) Elías Hernández	(Mexico) Cruz Azul	1	1		
2	(Mexico) José Madueña	(Mexico) Cruz Azul	1		1	
2	(Argentina) Ariel Nahuelpán	(Mexico) Tijuana	1	1		
2	(Mexico) Orbelín Pineda	(Mexico) Cruz Azul	1		1	
2	(Argentina) Guido Pizarro	(Mexico) Tigres UANL	1			1
2	(Uruguay) Jonathan Rodríguez	(Mexico) Cruz Azul	1			1
2	(United States) David Romney	(United States) LA Galaxy	1	1		
2	(Chile) Eduardo Vargas	(Mexico) Tigres UANL	1	1		
2	(Peru) Yoshimar Yotún	(Mexico) Cruz Azul	1			1
