= 2022–23 Liga MX season =

76th professional season of the top-flight football league in Mexico

Liga MX
- Season: 2022–23
- Champions: Apertura: Pachuca (7th title); Clausura: UANL (8th title)
- Champions Cup: Pachuca; UANL; Toluca; Guadalajara; Monterrey; América
- Matches: 306; Apertura: 153; Clausura: 153
- Goals: 852 (2.78 per match); Apertura: 420 (2.75 per match); Clausura: 432 (2.82 per match)
- Top goalscorer: Apertura: Nicolás Ibáñez (11 goals); Clausura: Henry Martín (14 goals)
- Biggest home win: Apertura: América 7–0 Cruz Azul (20 August 2022); Clausura: América 6–0 Mazatlán (28 January 2023)
- Biggest away win: Apertura: Necaxa 0–4 Guadalajara (19 August 2022); UNAM 1–5 Santos Laguna (21 August 2022); Clausura: Santos Laguna 0–5 Toluca (23 February 2023)
- Highest scoring: Apertura: Santos Laguna 4–3 Monterrey (3 July 2022); América 7–0 Cruz Azul (20 August 2022); Pachuca 6–1 Tijuana (11 September 2022); Clausura: Puebla 5–2 Tijuana (29 April 2023)
- Longest winning run: Apertura: 9 matches América; Clausura: 7 matches Monterrey
- Longest unbeaten run: Apertura: 12 matches América; Clausura: 12 matches Monterrey
- Longest winless run: Apertura: 12 matches Puebla; Clausura: 10 matches Atlas
- Longest losing run: Apertura: 4 matches Cruz Azul; León; Clausura: 6 matches Mazatlán
- Highest attendance: Apertura: 65,461; América vs Guadalajara (17 September 2022); Clausura: 66,364; Cruz Azul vs América (15 April 2023)
- Lowest attendance: Apertura: 5,668; Pachuca vs Atlas (25 August 2022); Clausura: 8,819; Mazatlán vs Pachuca (16 February 2023)
- Total attendance: Apertura: 2,977,293; Clausura: 3,450,854
- Average attendance: Apertura: 20,533; Clausura: 23,160
- Stats are from the regular season only Source: Liga MX

The 2022–23 Liga MX season (known as the Liga BBVA MX for sponsorship reasons) was the 76th professional season of the top-flight football league in Mexico. The season was divided into two championships—the Apertura 2022 and the Clausura 2023—each in an identical format and each contested by the same eighteen teams. The winners of the two championships met in the 2023 Campeón de Campeones match.

With the 2022 FIFA World Cup commencing on 20 November, the second leg of the Apertura 2022 final was played on 30 October.

== Clubs ==
=== Stadiums and locations ===
The Estadio Azteca will be closed from 2023 to 2025 due to renovations for the 2026 FIFA World Cup. Although the project was anticipated to begin in January 2023, the renovations were postponed for the summer of 2023.

Team	Location	Stadium	Capacity
América	Mexico City	Azteca	87,000
Atlas	Guadalajara, Jalisco	Jalisco	55,110
Atlético San Luis	San Luis Potosí, San Luis Potosí	Alfonso Lastras	25,709
Cruz Azul	Mexico City	Azteca	87,000
Guadalajara	Zapopan, Jalisco	Akron	45,364
Juárez	Ciudad Juárez, Chihuahua	Olímpico Benito Juárez	19,703
León	León, Guanajuato	León	31,297
Mazatlán	Mazatlán, Sinaloa	Mazatlán	25,000
Monterrey	Guadalupe, Nuevo León	BBVA	53,500
Necaxa	Aguascalientes, Aguascalientes	Victoria	23,851
Pachuca	Pachuca, Hidalgo	Hidalgo	27,512
Puebla	Puebla, Puebla	Cuauhtémoc	51,726
Querétaro	Querétaro, Querétaro	Corregidora	33,162
Santos Laguna	Torreón, Coahuila	Corona	29,237
Tijuana	Tijuana, Baja California	Caliente	27,333
Toluca	Toluca, State of Mexico	Nemesio Díez	31,000
UANL	San Nicolás de los Garza, Nuevo León	Universitario	41,886
UNAM	Mexico City	Olímpico Universitario	48,297

Locations of the 2022–23 Liga MX teams
Greater Mexico City Liga MX football clubs

=== Personnel and kits ===
Team	Chairman	Head coach	Captain	Kit manufacturer	Shirt sponsor(s) (front)
América	Santiago Baños	(Argentina) Fernando Ortiz	(Mexico) Henry Martín	Nike	AT&T, The Home Depot
Atlas	José Riestra	(Mexico) Benjamín Mora	(Mexico) Aldo Rocha	Charly	Caliente, Perdura, Uniclick
Atlético San Luis	Alberto Marrero	(Brazil) André Jardine	(Mexico) Javier Güémez	Sporelli	Canel's, BH Fitness, Cementos Moctezuma, Laboratorio TEQUIS
Cruz Azul	Víctor Velázquez	(Brazil) Ricardo Ferretti	(Mexico) José de Jesús Corona	Joma	Cemento Cruz Azul
Guadalajara	Amaury Vergara	(Serbia) Veljko Paunović	(Mexico) Víctor Guzmán	Puma	Caliente
Juárez	Miguel Ángel Garza	(Mexico) Diego Mejía	(Mexico) Alfredo Talavera	Sporelli	Betcris
León	Jesús Martínez Murguia	(Argentina) Nicolás Larcamón	(Mexico) Rodolfo Cota	Charly	Cementos Fortaleza, Office Depot, Roshfrans, Telcel
Mazatlán	Mauricio Lanz González	(Argentina) Rubén Omar Romano	(Mexico) Néstor Vidrio	Pirma	Caliente, Paquetexpress, Banda el Recodo
Monterrey	José Antonio Noriega	(Mexico) Víctor Manuel Vucetich	(Paraguay) Celso Ortiz	Puma	BBVA, Codere
Necaxa	Ernesto Tinajero Flores	(Argentina) Andrés Lillini	(Uruguay) Fabricio Formiliano	Pirma	Rolcar, Playdoit, J.M. Romo
Pachuca	Armando Martínez Patiño	(Uruguay) Guillermo Almada	(Argentina) Oscar Ustari	Charly	Cementos Fortaleza, Office Depot, Roshfrans, Telcel
Puebla	Manuel Jiménez García	(Mexico) Eduardo Arce	(Paraguay) Antony Silva	Pirma	Caliente, Red Cola
Querétaro	Vacant	(Argentina) Mauro Gerk	(Mexico) Pablo Barrera	Charly	Pedigree Petfoods, Boing, Grupo Sayer, NOX Móvil, Petro Figue's, Tarro 33
Santos Laguna	Dante Elizalde	(Uruguay) Pablo Repetto	(Mexico) Carlos Acevedo	Charly	Soriana, Peñoles, Lala, Grupo SIMSA
Tijuana	Jorge Hank Inzunsa	(Mexico) Miguel Herrera	(Argentina) Lisandro López	Charly	Caliente
Toluca	Francisco Suinaga	(Mexico) Ignacio Ambríz	(Chile) Claudio Baeza	Under Armour	Roshfrans
UANL	Mauricio Culebro	(Uruguay) Robert Siboldi	(Argentina) Guido Pizarro	Adidas	Cemex, Bitso
UNAM	Leopoldo Silva Gutiérrez	(Argentina) Antonio Mohamed	(Argentina) Nicolás Freire	Nike	DHL Express

=== Managerial changes ===
Team	Outgoing manager	Manner of departure	Date of vacancy	Replaced by	Date of appointment	Position in table	Ref.
Pre-Apertura changes
Juárez	(Brazil) Ricardo Ferretti	Mutual agreement	5 May 2022	(Argentina) Hernán Cristante	26 May 2022	Preseason	
Santos Laguna	(Mexico) Eduardo Fentanes (Interim)	Ratified as manager	10 May 2022	(Mexico) Eduardo Fentanes	10 May 2022	Preseason	
Cruz Azul	(Peru) Juan Reynoso	Sacked	19 May 2022	(Uruguay) Diego Aguirre	30 May 2022	Preseason	
Tijuana	(Argentina) Sebastián Méndez	Resigned	25 May 2022	(Argentina) Ricardo Valiño	30 May 2022	Preseason	
Querétaro	(Argentina) Hernán Cristante	Signed by Juárez	26 May 2022	(Argentina) Mauro Gerk	30 May 2022	Preseason	
América	(Argentina) Fernando Ortíz (Interim)	Ratified as manager	27 May 2022	(Argentina) Fernando Ortíz	27 May 2022	Preseason	
León	(Mexico) Christian Martínez (Interim)	End of tenure as caretaker	30 May 2022	(Portugal) Renato Paiva	30 May 2022	Preseason	
Guadalajara	(Mexico) Ricardo Cadena (Interim)	Ratified as manager	31 May 2022	(Mexico) Ricardo Cadena	31 May 2022	Preseason	
Apertura changes
Cruz Azul	(Uruguay) Diego Aguirre	Sacked	21 August 2022	(Mexico) Raúl Gutiérrez (Interim)	22 August 2022	17th	
Pre–Clausura changes
Atlas	(Argentina) Diego Cocca	Resigned	2 October 2022 (Note: Announced on 23 September 2022 during week 16.)	(Mexico) Benjamín Mora	6 October 2022	Preseason	
UNAM	(Argentina) Andrés Lillini	Mutual agreement	4 October 2022	(Mexico) Rafael Puente Jr.	28 October 2022	Preseason	
Necaxa	(Mexico) Jaime Lozano	Mutual agreement	10 October 2022	(Argentina) Andrés Lillini	4 November 2022	Preseason	
Guadalajara	(Mexico) Ricardo Cadena	Sacked	16 October 2022	(Serbia) Veljko Paunović	31 October 2022	Preseason	
UANL	(Mexico) Miguel Herrera	Sacked	9 November 2022	(Argentina) Diego Cocca	16 November 2022	Preseason	
Puebla	(Argentina) Nicolás Larcamón	Resigned	9 November 2022	(Mexico) Eduardo Arce	18 November 2022	Preseason	
León	(Portugal) Renato Paiva	Resigned	28 November 2022	(Argentina) Nicolás Larcamón	30 November 2022	Preseason	
Cruz Azul	(Mexico) Raúl Gutiérrez (Interim)	Ratified as manager	6 December 2022	(Mexico) Raúl Gutiérrez	6 December 2022	Preseason	
Clausura changes
Mazatlán	(Mexico) Gabriel Caballero	Resigned	29 January 2023	(Mexico) Christian Ramírez (Interim)	29 January 2023	18th	
Tijuana	(Argentina) Ricardo Valiño	Sacked	4 February 2023	(Mexico) Cirilo Saucedo (Interim)	7 February 2023	14th	
Mazatlán	(Mexico) Christian Ramírez (Interim)	End of tenure as caretaker	6 February 2023	(Argentina) Rubén Omar Romano	6 February 2023	18th	
UANL	(Argentina) Diego Cocca	Sacked	9 February 2023	(Mexico) Marco Antonio Ruiz	9 February 2023	3rd	
Tijuana	(Mexico) Cirilo Saucedo (Interim)	End of tenure as caretaker	11 February 2023 (Note: Announced on 10 February 2023 during week 6.)	(Mexico) Miguel Herrera	11 February 2023	11th	
Cruz Azul	(Mexico) Raúl Gutiérrez	Sacked	13 February 2023	(Mexico) Joaquín Moreno (Interim)	14 February 2023	17th	
Cruz Azul	(Mexico) Joaquín Moreno (Interim)	End of tenure as caretaker	22 February 2023 (Note: Announced on 22 February 2023 before week 9.)	(Brazil) Ricardo Ferretti	22 February 2023	13th	
UNAM	(Mexico) Rafael Puente Jr.	Sacked	19 March 2023	(Mexico) Raúl Alpizar (Interim)	21 March 2023	16th	
UNAM	(Mexico) Raúl Alpizar (Interim)	End of tenure as caretaker	3 April 2023 (Note: Announced on 27 March 2023 before week 13.)	(Argentina) Antonio Mohamed	3 April 2023	17th	
Juárez	(Argentina) Hernán Cristante	Mutual agreement	3 April 2023	(Mexico) Diego Mejía	4 April 2023	14th	
UANL	(Mexico) Marco Antonio Ruiz	Sacked	9 April 2023	(Uruguay) Robert Siboldi	10 April 2023	7th	
Santos Laguna	(Mexico) Eduardo Fentanes	Sacked	24 April 2023	(Uruguay) Pablo Repetto	24 April 2023	11th	

== Torneo Apertura ==
The Apertura 2022 was the first tournament of the season. The tournament began on 1 July. The defending champions were Atlas.

=== Regular phase ===
==== League table ====
Pos	Team	Pld	W	D	L	GF	GA	GD	Pts	Qualification
1	América	17	12	2	3	37	16	+21	38	Qualification for the quarter-finals
2	Monterrey	17	10	5	2	29	13	+16	35	Qualification for the quarter-finals
3	Santos Laguna	17	10	3	4	38	21	+17	33	Qualification for the quarter-finals
4	Pachuca (C)	17	9	5	3	28	15	+13	32	Qualification for the quarter-finals
5	UANL	17	9	3	5	24	14	+10	30	Qualification for the reclassification
6	Toluca	17	7	6	4	27	23	+4	27	Qualification for the reclassification
7	Cruz Azul	17	7	3	7	26	34	−8	24	Qualification for the reclassification
8	Puebla	17	4	10	3	24	22	+2	22	Qualification for the reclassification
9	Guadalajara	17	5	7	5	19	17	+2	22	Qualification for the reclassification
10	León	17	6	4	7	25	29	−4	22	Qualification for the reclassification
11	Juárez	17	4	7	6	17	18	−1	19	Qualification for the reclassification
12	Necaxa	17	5	4	8	19	26	−7	19	Qualification for the reclassification
13	Atlético San Luis	17	4	6	7	15	23	−8	18	
14	Mazatlán	17	3	8	6	17	24	−7	17	
15	Tijuana	17	4	5	8	18	30	−12	17	
16	UNAM	17	2	8	7	21	31	−10	14	
17	Atlas	17	3	4	10	16	27	−11	13	
18	Querétaro	17	1	6	10	18	35	−17	9	

Source: Liga MX
Rules for classification: 1) Points; 2) Goal difference; 3) Number of goals scored; 4) Head-to-head results between tied teams; 5) Number of goals scored away; 6) Highest relegation coefficient; 7) Fair Play points
(C) Champions

==== Positions by round ====
Team ╲ Round	1	2	3	4	5	6	7	8	9	10	11	12	13	14	15	16	17
América	11	13	11	15	15	15	14	9	5	4	2	1	1	1	1	1	1
Monterrey	13	6	4	1	1	2	2	2	2	1	1	2	2	2	2	2	2
Santos Laguna	4	8	10	11	13	11	6	8	6	5	3	4	3	4	4	4	3
Pachuca	3	3	2	5	6	7	4	4	9	6	4	3	4	3	3	3	4
UANL	14	9	5	3	3	1	3	3	3	3	5	6	5	5	5	5	5
Toluca	2	1	3	2	2	3	1	1	1	2	6	5	6	6	6	6	6
Cruz Azul	5	7	12	10	11	10	11	15	16	17	15	15	16	13	9	10	7
Puebla	1	2	1	4	5	5	7	6	8	9	8	9	9	11	10	7	8
Guadalajara	12	15	15	16	14	14	17	17	17	13	7	8	7	7	7	8	9
León	6	5	7	6	9	6	9	11	13	15	13	14	11	9	8	9	10
Juárez	10	4	6	9	10	12	12	16	11	11	12	12	14	16	13	14	11
Necaxa	17	11	14	8	4	8	5	5	7	10	10	7	8	10	12	11	12
Atlético San Luis	15	10	13	12	12	13	15	14	10	7	9	10	12	8	11	12	13
Mazatlán	16	17	16	17	17	17	16	10	12	12	14	13	10	12	14	13	14
Tijuana	7	16	18	13	8	4	8	7	4	8	11	11	13	14	15	15	15
UNAM	8	12	8	7	7	9	10	13	15	16	17	17	15	15	16	16	16
Atlas	9	14	9	14	16	16	13	12	14	14	16	16	17	17	17	17	17
Querétaro	18	18	17	18	18	18	18	18	18	18	18	18	18	18	18	18	18

Leader and qualification to Liguilla
Qualification to Liguilla
Qualification to Reclassification
Last place in table

Source: Liga MX

=== Results ===
Teams played every other team once (either at home or away), completing a total of 17 rounds.

Home \ Away	AMÉ	ATL	ASL	CAZ	GUA	JUÁ	LEÓ	MAZ	MON	NEC	PAC	PUE	QUE	SAN	TIJ	TOL	UNL	UNM
América	—	0–0	3–0	7–0	2–1	2–1	—	—	—	—	—	—	—	3–3	—	1–0	2–1	—
Atlas	—	—	1–3	3–2	—	0–1	—	—	—	1–0	—	1–1	3–1	—	1–2	—	—	0–0
Atlético San Luis	—	—	—	0–0	—	—	1–2	—	0–1	1–2	1–2	—	—	—	0–0	1–0	0–3	3–2
Cruz Azul	—	—	—	—	2–1	—	2–1	2–0	—	1–0	1–2	2–2	2–1	—	1–2	2–3	—	—
Guadalajara	—	1–1	0–1	—	—	0–0	0–0	—	1–0	—	0–0	1–0	2–2	1–1	—	—	1–4	3–1
Juárez	—	—	1–1	2–2	—	—	—	1–1	0–1	—	2–1	—	1–1	—	—	1–1	0–1	3–1
León	3–2	4–2	—	—	—	1–0	—	0–3	—	—	—	—	3–1	—	2–2	0–1	—	3–3
Mazatlán	1–3	1–0	1–1	—	2–1	—	—	—	—	—	—	2–4	1–1	—	—	1–1	0–1	—
Monterrey	3–2	2–0	—	3–2	—	—	5–1	0–0	—	—	0–0	1–0	—	—	—	—	0–0	—
Necaxa	1–2	—	—	—	0–4	1–0	3–2	2–2	1–2	—	2–0	—	—	—	—	1–3	—	—
Pachuca	0–3	3–1	—	—	—	—	1–0	1–1	—	—	—	—	2–0	2–0	6–1	—	2–0	0–0
Puebla	1–2	—	0–0	—	—	2–2	1–1	—	—	2–2	2–2	—	—	1–0	—	—	2–1	2–1
Querétaro	0–1	—	1–1	—	2–2	—	—	—	0–3	1–2	—	1–1	—	3–3	2–0	—	—	—
Santos Laguna	—	1–0	4–1	4–0	1–1	2–0	2–1	3–0	4–3	3–1	—	—	—	—	—	—	—	—
Tijuana	2–0	—	—	—	1–2	0–2	—	2–0	0–3	1–1	—	3–3	—	0–2	—	—	—	—
Toluca	—	3–2	—	—	0–0	—	—	—	1–1	—	1–4	1–1	4–1	2–1	3–1	—	—	2–2
UANL	—	2–0	—	2–3	—	—	0–1	—	—	0–0	—	—	2–1	2–0	1–0	3–1	—	—
UNAM	0–3	—	—	1–2	—	—	—	1–1	1–1	1–0	—	—	4–1	1–5	1–1	—	1–1	—

Source: Liga MX
Legend: Blue = home team win; Yellow = draw; Red = away team win.
For upcoming matches, an "a" indicates there is an article about the rivalry between the two participants.

=== Individual statistics ===
==== Top goalscorers ====
Players sorted first by goals scored, then by last name.

Rank	Player	Club	Goals
1	(Argentina) Nicolás Ibáñez	Pachuca	11
2	(Mexico) Henry Martín	América	10
3	(Mexico) Martín Barragán	Puebla	8
3	(Argentina) Lucas Di Yorio	León	8
3	(France) André-Pierre Gignac	UANL	8
3	(Uruguay) Abel Hernández	Atlético San Luis	8
7	(Uruguay) Facundo Batista	Necaxa	7
7	(Chile) Jean Meneses	Toluca	7
9	(Argentina) Javier Correa	Santos Laguna	6
9	(Argentina) Juan Dinenno	UNAM	6
9	(Uruguay) Gabriel Fernández	Juárez	6
9	(Colombia) Harold Preciado	Santos Laguna	6
9	(Uruguay) Jonathan Rodríguez	América	6
9	(Brazil) Camilo Sanvezzo	Toluca	6
9	(Argentina) Leonardo Suárez	Santos Laguna	6

Source: Liga MX

==== Clean sheets ====
Rank	Player	Club	Clean sheets	Avg.	Ref
1	(Argentina) Nahuel Guzmán	UANL	8	0.69	
2	(Argentina) Oscar Ustari	Pachuca	7	0.77	
2	(Mexico) Miguel Jiménez	Guadalajara	7	1.00	
2	(Mexico) Guillermo Ochoa	América	7	1.00	
5	(Argentina) Esteban Andrada	Monterrey	6	0.44	
6	(Mexico) Carlos Acevedo	Santos Laguna	5	1.24	
6	(Argentina) Marcelo Barovero	Atlético San Luis	5	1.35	
8	(Mexico) Alfredo Talavera	Juárez	3	1.06	
8	(Mexico) Luis Cárdenas	Monterrey	3	1.13	
8	(Colombia) Camilo Vargas	Atlas	3	1.33	
8	(Uruguay) Nicolás Vikonis	Mazatlán	3	1.40	
8	(Mexico) Luis Malagón	Necaxa	3	1.53	
8	(Mexico) Rodolfo Cota	León	3	1.71	
8	(Mexico) Jonathan Orozco	Tijuana	3	1.76	
8	(Mexico) Julio González	UNAM	3	1.80	

==== Hat-tricks ====
Player	For	Against	Result	Date
(Mexico) Alfonso González	Monterrey	León	5–1 (H)	6 August 2022
(Uruguay) Abel Hernández	Atlético San Luis	UNAM	3–2 (H)	18 August 2022

(H) – Home; (A) – Away

==== Scoring ====
- First goal of the season:
  (Mexico) Israel Reyes for Puebla against Mazatlán (1 July 2022)
- Last goal of the season:
  (Mexico) Alfonso Alvarado for León against Tijuana (2 October 2022)

==== Discipline ====
Player

- Most yellow cards: 9
  - (Uruguay) Fernando Gorriarán (Santos Laguna)
- Most red cards: 3
  - (Chile) Nicolás Díaz (Tijuana)

Team

- Most yellow cards: 48
  - Puebla
- Most red cards: 8
  - UANL
- Fewest yellow cards: 28
  - América
- Fewest red cards: 0
  - América
  - Monterrey

Source: Liga MX

=== Attendance ===
Pos	Team	Total	High	Low	Average	Change
1	UANL	326,644	42,615	37,638	40,831	+37.4%
2	Monterrey	301,211	52,810	28,371	37,651	+37.7%
3	América	290,393	65,461	20,410	36,299	+28.4%
4	Guadalajara	238,680	35,828	17,424	26,520	+16.1%
5	Tijuana	195,164	29,333	19,733	24,396	+62.4%
6	UNAM	202,253	45,893	7,990	22,473	+32.0%
7	Toluca	192,842	27,273	17,402	21,427	+68.4%
8	León	162,771	24,024	16,690	20,346	+55.9%
9	Puebla	175,324	43,632	11,078	19,480	−16.0%
10	Cruz Azul	150,807	35,378	10,255	16,756	−21.9%
11	Atlas	116,445	23,649	10,308	14,556	−15.3%
12	Santos Laguna	121,408	18,721	7,979	13,490	+12.0%
13	Atlético San Luis	120,785	20,860	9,464	13,421	+59.8%
14	Necaxa	104,539	20,193	10,689	13,067	−4.8%
15	Juárez	113,716	16,024	9,733	12,635	+43.4%
16	Mazatlán	94,331	18,365	8,756	11,791	+3.0%
17	Pachuca	69,980	10,938	5,668	7,776	−9.6%
18	Querétaro	0	0	0	0	−100.0%^{1}
	League total	2,977,293	65,461	5,668	20,533	+21.4%

Source: Liga MX
Notes:
Only regular season listed.
Querétaro's stats are not included in the "League total" average attendance number.
1: As a result of the riot on 5 March 2022, Querétaro played all matches behind closed doors for one year. The ban began on 7 March 2022.

==== Highest and lowest ====
Highest attended					Lowest attended			
Week	Home	Score	Away	Attendance	Home	Score	Away	Attendance
1	UANL	2–3	Cruz Azul	41,273	Pachuca	2–0	Querétaro	6,167
2	Monterrey	3–2	América	41,342	Mazatlán	0–1	UANL	12,112
3	UANL	1–0	Tijuana	40,583	Pachuca	1–1	Mazatlán	7,482
4	UANL	2–0	Atlas	42,615	Pachuca	0–0	UNAM	8,305
5	Monterrey	1–0	Puebla	35,893	Necaxa	2–0	Pachuca	11,828
6	UANL	2–1	Querétaro	41,432	Juárez	1–1	Toluca	12,854
7	Monterrey	5–1	León	37,154	Atlético San Luis	1–2	Necaxa	9,464
8	UNAM	0–3	América	45,893	Juárez	2–1	Pachuca	9,733
9	Guadalajara	1–4	UANL	30,064	Santos Laguna	2–1	León	10,164
10	Monterrey	0–0	UANL	52,810	Pachuca	1–0	León	5,801
11	UANL	0–0	Necaxa	40,103	Santos Laguna	4–1	Atlético San Luis	12,053
12	América	2–1	UANL	45,384	Pachuca	2–0	Santos Laguna	6,592
13	UANL	3–1	Toluca	37,638	Santos Laguna	3–1	Necaxa	7,979
14	UANL	0–1	León	41,615	Pachuca	6–1	Tijuana	9,511
15	América	2–1	Guadalajara	65,461	Atlético San Luis	1–2	Pachuca	9,094
16	Guadalajara	1–0	Monterrey	34,279	Pachuca	3–1	Atlas	5,668
17	Puebla	1–2	América	43,632	Santos Laguna	3–0	Mazatlán	14,461

Source: Liga MX

1. Does not include matches played behind closed doors.

=== Final phase ===
==== Reclassification ====
Team 1	Score	Team 2
UANL	2–0	Necaxa
Toluca	3–0	Juárez
Cruz Azul	1–0	León
Puebla	1–1 (5–4 p)	Guadalajara

- All matches were played in a single leg hosted by the higher seed.
- If a match ended in a draw, it proceeded directly to a penalty shoot-out.

==== Bracket ====
Quarter-finals
2	Monterrey	0	3	3
7	Cruz Azul	0	0	0
4	Pachuca (s)	0	2	2
5	UANL	1	1	2
1	América	6	5	11
8	Puebla	1	1	2
3	Santos Laguna	3	1	4
6	Toluca	4	2	6

Semi-finals
2	Monterrey	2	0	2
4	Pachuca	5	1	6
1	América	1	1	2
6	Toluca	2	1	3

Final
4	Pachuca	5	3	8
6	Toluca	1	1	2

- Teams were re-seeded each round.
- The winners of the reclassification matches were seeded based on their regular season position.
- The team with more goals on aggregate after two matches advanced.
- If the two teams were tied on aggregate, the higher seeded team advanced (the away goals rule was not applied).
- In the final, if the two teams were tied after both legs, they went to extra time and, if necessary, a penalty shoot-out.
- Both finalists qualified for the 2024 CONCACAF Champions Cup.

==== Quarterfinals ====
Team 1	Agg.	Team 2	1st leg	2nd leg
Puebla	2–11	América	1–6	1–5
Cruz Azul	0–3	Monterrey	0–0	0–3
Toluca	6–4	Santos Laguna	4–3	2–1
UANL	2–2 (s)	Pachuca	1–0	1–2

==== Semifinals ====
Team 1	Agg.	Team 2	1st leg	2nd leg
Toluca	3–2	América	2–1	1–1
Pachuca	6–2	Monterrey	5–2	1–0

==== Finals ====
Team 1	Agg.	Team 2	1st leg	2nd leg
Toluca	2–8	Pachuca	1–5	1–3

27 October 2022
20:06 CDT (UTC−5)

Toluca	1–5	Pachuca
Sierra 78'	Report	Ibarra 8', 36'; Cabral 13'; Isais 41'; Ibáñez 53'

Estadio Nemesio Díez, Toluca
Attendance: 27,273
Referee: Marco Antonio Ortiz (Durango)

30 October 2022
19:36 CST (UTC−6)

Pachuca	3–1	Toluca
Guzmán 45+3'; Ibáñez 53'; Cabral 75' (pen.)	Report	López 21'

Estadio Hidalgo, Pachuca
Attendance: 21,080
Referee: Adonai Escobedo (Aguascalientes)

Pachuca won 8–2 on aggregate.

== Torneo Clausura ==
The Clausura tournament began on 6 January and ended on 28 May 2023. The defending champions were Pachuca.

=== Regular phase ===
==== League table ====
Pos	Team	Pld	W	D	L	GF	GA	GD	Pts	Qualification
1	Monterrey	17	13	1	3	35	14	+21	40	Qualification for the quarter-finals
2	América	17	9	7	1	36	21	+15	34	Qualification for the quarter-finals
3	Guadalajara	17	10	4	3	28	18	+10	34	Qualification for the quarter-finals
4	Toluca	17	9	5	3	34	19	+15	32	Qualification for the quarter-finals
5	Pachuca	17	10	1	6	32	22	+10	31	Qualification for the reclassification
6	León	17	8	6	3	23	13	+10	30	Qualification for the reclassification
7	UANL (C)	17	7	4	6	20	17	+3	25	Qualification for the reclassification
8	Cruz Azul	17	7	3	7	21	22	−1	24	Qualification for the reclassification
9	Atlas	17	4	9	4	27	22	+5	21	Qualification for the reclassification
10	Querétaro	17	4	8	5	16	21	−5	20	Team ended last place in the coefficient table (Note: The last place team in the coefficient table could not qualify for the final phase; the 13th place team qualified in their stead.)
11	Puebla	17	6	2	9	26	34	−8	20	Qualification for the reclassification
12	Atlético San Luis	17	5	4	8	16	21	−5	19	Qualification for the reclassification
13	Santos Laguna	17	5	4	8	23	37	−14	19	Qualification for the reclassification
14	UNAM	17	5	3	9	24	32	−8	18	
15	Tijuana	17	3	7	7	19	29	−10	16	
16	Juárez	17	3	6	8	17	25	−8	15	
17	Necaxa	17	3	5	9	16	24	−8	14	
18	Mazatlán	17	2	1	14	19	41	−22	7	

Source: Liga MX
Rules for classification: 1) Points; 2) Goal difference; 3) Number of goals scored; 4) Head-to-head results between tied teams; 5) Number of goals scored away; 6) Highest relegation coefficient; 7) Fair Play points
(C) Champions

==== Positions by round ====
Team ╲ Round	1	2	3	4	5	6	7	8	9	10	11	12	13	14	15	16	17
Monterrey	16	8	3	2	2	1	1	1	1	1	1	1	1	1	1	1	1
América	9	12	11	7	8	4	4	3	5	6	5	2	4	3	2	2	2
Guadalajara	5	3	8	6	7	7	5	5	4	3	4	7	6	6	4	3	3
Toluca	11	13	7	9	10	5	8	6	2	5	2	3	2	2	3	4	4
Pachuca	1	5	2	1	1	3	2	4	6	4	6	4	5	5	6	5	5
León	10	6	14	11	13	11	6	7	7	7	7	5	3	4	5	6	6
UANL	2	1	1	3	3	2	3	2	3	2	3	6	7	7	7	7	7
Cruz Azul	6	14	17	17	17	17	17	16	11	12	9	8	8	8	8	8	8
Atlas	12	7	6	8	9	12	13	13	15	14	16	12	12	13	11	9	9
Querétaro	8	15	15	16	16	16	16	17	17	17	17	17	15	9	13	10	10
Puebla	18	10	10	12	15	14	15	15	16	13	10	11	9	10	14	14	11
Atlético San Luis	3	2	9	10	6	8	10	10	13	15	12	15	11	12	10	13	12
Santos Laguna	17	9	5	4	4	9	9	9	8	8	8	9	10	11	9	11	13
UNAM	4	11	4	5	5	10	11	11	10	11	14	16	17	15	12	12	14
Tijuana	7	16	16	15	14	13	14	14	12	9	13	14	16	17	15	15	15
Juárez	15	4	12	13	11	6	7	8	9	10	11	10	14	14	17	16	16
Necaxa	14	18	13	14	12	15	12	12	14	16	15	13	13	16	16	17	17
Mazatlán	13	17	18	18	18	18	18	18	18	18	18	18	18	18	18	18	18

Leader and qualification to Liguilla
Qualification to Liguilla
Qualification to Reclassification
Last place in table

Source: Liga MX

=== Results ===
Teams played every other team once (either at home or away), completing a total of 17 rounds.

Home \ Away	AMÉ	ATL	ASL	CAZ	GUA	JUÁ	LEÓ	MAZ	MON	NEC	PAC	PUE	QUE	SAN	TIJ	TOL	UNL	UNM
América	—	—	—	—	—	—	2–2	6–0	2–1	2–1	0–3	2–2	0–0	—	2–1	—	—	1–1
Atlas	2–2	—	—	—	3–3	—	0–1	2–1	0–2	—	4–1	—	—	2–2	—	0–0	0–1	—
Atlético San Luis	1–3	0–0	—	—	0–0	2–0	—	2–1	—	—	—	2–0	2–0	1–1	—	—	—	—
Cruz Azul	1–3	1–0	1–0	—	—	1–0	—	—	2–3	—	—	—	—	3–2	—	—	0–1	1–0
Guadalajara	2–4	—	0–0	2–1	—	—	—	4–1	—	1–0	—	—	1–1	2–0	2–1	1–2	—	—
Juárez	0–1	1–1	—	—	1–2	—	0–0	—	—	1–1	—	0–2	—	3–1	3–0	—	—	—
León	—	—	2–0	0–0	0–2	—	—	—	1–1	2–1	0–1	2–0	—	4–1	—	—	3–0	—
Mazatlán	—	—	—	3–1	—	2–3	1–2	—	0–2	0–1	2–3	—	—	1–2	1–2	—	—	1–2
Monterrey	—	—	3–1	—	0–1	3–0	—	—	—	2–1	—	—	2–0	1–2	4–0	2–1	—	4–1
Necaxa	—	1–3	2–3	1–0	—	—	—	—	—	—	—	1–1	1–1	0–0	1–1	—	0–1	3–1
Pachuca	—	—	2–1	0–2	1–1	4–1	—	—	1–2	2–1	—	5–1	—	—	—	1–2	—	—
Puebla	—	0–4	—	1–3	1–0	—	—	3–1	1–2	—	—	—	2–0	—	5–2	1–2	—	—
Querétaro	—	3–3	—	2–2	—	2–2	0–3	1–1	—	—	0–1	—	—	—	—	1–0	0–0	1–0
Santos Laguna	2–2	—	—	—	—	—	—	—	—	—	1–4	3–2	0–2	—	3–2	0–5	0–3	3–0
Tijuana	—	1–1	1–0	1–1	—	—	0–0	—	—	—	2–0	—	1–2	—	—	3–3	1–1	0–0
Toluca	2–2	—	2–0	3–1	—	1–1	0–0	4–1	—	3–0	—	—	—	—	—	—	3–2	—
UANL	0–2	—	0–0	—	1–2	0–0	—	1–2	0–1	—	4–1	1–0	—	—	—	—	—	4–2
UNAM	—	2–2	3–1	—	1–2	2–1	4–1	—	—	—	0–2	2–4	—	—	—	3–1	—	—

Source: Liga MX
Legend: Blue = home team win; Yellow = draw; Red = away team win.
For upcoming matches, an "a" indicates there is an article about the rivalry between the two participants.

=== Individual statistics ===
==== Top goalscorers ====
Players sorted first by goals scored, then by last name.

Rank	Player	Club	Goals
1	(Mexico) Henry Martín	América	14
2	(Mexico) Rogelio Funes Mori	Monterrey	12
2	(Colombia) Julián Quiñones	Atlas	12
4	(Argentina) Juan Dinenno	UNAM	8
4	(Paraguay) Carlos González	Toluca	8
6	(France) André-Pierre Gignac	UANL	7
6	(Mexico) Víctor Guzmán	Guadalajara	7
6	(Colombia) Harold Preciado	Santos Laguna	7
9	(Mexico) Uriel Antuna	Cruz Azul	6
9	(Uruguay) Maximiliano Araújo	Toluca	6
9	(Argentina) Javier Correa	Santos Laguna	6
9	(Mexico) Alfonso González	Monterrey	6
9	(Mexico) Javier López	Pachuca	6
9	(Uruguay) Brian Lozano	Atlas	6
9	(Mexico) Guillermo Martínez	Puebla	6
9	(Spain) Édgar Méndez	Necaxa	6
9	(Chile) Diego Valdés	América	6

Source: Liga MX

==== Clean sheets ====
Rank	Player	Club	Clean sheets	Average
1	(Mexico) Rodolfo Cota	León	9	0.76
2	(Argentina) Nahuel Guzmán	UANL	8	0.94
3	(Argentina) Esteban Andrada	Monterrey	7	0.75
4	(Argentina) Marcelo Barovero	Atlético San Luis	6	1.13
4	(Mexico) José de Jesús Corona	Cruz Azul	6	1.13
6	(Mexico) Miguel Jiménez	Guadalajara	5	1.06
6	(Brazil) Tiago Volpi	Toluca	5	1.12
6	(Mexico) Gil Alcalá	Querétaro	5	1.25
9	(Argentina) Oscar Ustari	Pachuca	4	1.41
9	(Mexico) José Antonio Rodríguez	Tijuana	4	1.71

==== Hat-tricks ====
Player	For	Against	Result	Date
(Mexico) Rogelio Funes Mori	Monterrey	Atlético San Luis	3–1 (H)	21 January 2023
(Mexico) Henry Martín	América	Mazatlán	6–0 (H)	28 January 2023
(Mexico) Rogelio Funes Mori	Monterrey	UNAM	4–1 (H)	29 April 2023

(H) – Home; (A) – Away

==== Scoring ====
- First goal of the season:
  (Uruguay) Juan Manuel Sanabria for Atlético San Luis against Necaxa (6 January 2023)
- Last goal of the season:
  (Mexico) Héctor Uribe for León against UANL (30 April 2023)

==== Discipline ====
Player

- Most yellow cards: 7
  - (Colombia) Christian Rivera (Querétaro)
  - (Mexico) Luis Rodríguez (Juárez)
- Most red cards: 2
  - (Mexico) Paul Bellón (León)
  - (Ecuador) Michael Estrada (Cruz Azul)
  - (Uruguay) Gabriel Fernández (Juárez)
  - (Argentina) Lucas González (Santos Laguna)

Team

- Most yellow cards: 45
  - Necaxa
  - Puebla
- Most red cards: 6
  - León
  - UNAM
- Fewest yellow cards: 25
  - Pachuca
- Fewest red cards: 0
  - América

Source: Liga MX

=== Attendance ===
Pos	Team	Total	High	Low	Average	Change
1	Monterrey	392,295	48,788	40,103	43,588	+15.8%
2	UANL	350,552	41,615	28,879	38,950	−4.6%
3	América	339,926	60,332	22,588	37,770	+4.1%
4	Guadalajara	254,279	38,834	19,078	31,785	+19.9%
5	Cruz Azul	233,890	66,364	16,873	29,236	+74.5%
6	Toluca	200,033	27,273	19,610	25,004	+16.7%
7	Tijuana	213,597	27,333	20,233	23,533	−3.5%
8	León	206,518	24,737	20,113	22,946	+12.8%
9	Querétaro	93,504	21,518	17,590	18,701	n/a^{1}
10	UNAM	148,263	42,823	11,550	18,533	−17.5%
11	Atlas	157,064	29,814	11,555	17,452	+19.9%
12	Puebla	139,450	30,132	10,613	17,431	−10.5%
13	Santos Laguna	138,284	25,746	13,797	17,286	+28.1%
14	Atlético San Luis	129,683	22,240	10,832	16,210	+20.8%
15	Pachuca	121,662	20,777	10,281	15,208	+95.6%
16	Necaxa	122,855	18,114	11,161	13,651	+4.5%
17	Juárez	107,503	19,314	11,272	13,438	+6.4%
18	Mazatlán	101,496	17,023	8,819	11,277	−4.4%
	League total	3,450,854	66,364	8,819	23,160	+12.8%

Source: Liga MX
Notes:
Only regular season listed.
Querétaro's stats for the first four home matches (all played behind closed doors) are not included in the "League total" average attendance number.
1: As a result of the riot on 5 March 2022, Querétaro played all matches behind closed doors for one year. On 3 March 2023, the league announced that the ban would be lifted on 19 March 2023.

==== Highest and lowest ====
Highest attended					Lowest attended			
Week	Home	Score	Away	Attendance	Home	Score	Away	Attendance
1	Monterrey	0–1	Guadalajara	44,498	Mazatlán	1–2	León	10,005
2	UANL	4–1	Pachuca	41,615	Puebla	2–0	Querétaro	10,613
3	Monterrey	3–1	Atlético San Luis	40,162	Mazatlán	1–2	Santos Laguna	9,854
4	UANL	0–0	Atlético San Luis	41,615	Atlas	2–2	Santos Laguna	14,073
5	Monterrey	2–1	Toluca	48,788	Necaxa	1–1	Tijuana	12,225
6	UANL	4–2	UNAM	41,615	Puebla	3–1	Mazatlán	10,290
7	Monterrey	2–1	Querétaro	41,660	Mazatlán	2–3	Pachuca	8,819
8	Monterrey	2–1	Necaxa	44,132	Juárez	0–0	León	10,229
9	UANL	1–2	Guadalajara	41,615	Mazatlán	1–2	UNAM	9,970
10	América	0–3	Pachuca	46,273	UNAM	2–4	Puebla	11,851
11	UANL	0–2	América	41,615	Juárez	1–1	Necaxa	11,272
12	UANL	0–1	Monterrey	41,615	Mazatlán	0–1	Necaxa	12,205
13	Monterrey	4–0	Tijuana	40,103	Juárez	0–2	Puebla	12,138
14	América	2–1	Monterrey	49,974	UNAM	3–1	Atlético San Luis	11,550
15	Cruz Azul	1–3	América	66,364	Mazatlán	1–2	Tijuana	10,139
16	América	1–1	UNAM	60,332	Mazatlán	0–2	Monterrey	11,440
17	Monterrey	4–1	UNAM	45,915	Puebla	5–2	Tijuana	15,001

Source: Liga MX

1. Does not include matches played behind closed doors.

=== Final phase ===
==== Reclassification ====
Team 1	Score	Team 2
Pachuca	4–4 (2–4 p)	Santos Laguna
León	1–3	Atlético San Luis
UANL	1–0	Puebla
Cruz Azul	0–1	Atlas

- All matches were played in a single leg hosted by the higher seed.
- If a match ended in a draw, it proceeded directly to a penalty shoot-out.

==== Bracket ====
Quarter-finals
2	América	3	1	4
7	Atlético San Luis	1	2	3
3	Guadalajara (s)	0	1	1
6	Atlas	1	0	1
1	Monterrey	0	2	2
8	Santos Laguna	0	0	0
4	Toluca	1	3	4
5	UANL	4	1	5

Semi-finals
2	América	1	1	2
3	Guadalajara	0	3	3
1	Monterrey	1	0	1
5	UANL	1	1	2

Final
3	Guadalajara	0	2	2
5	UANL (a.e.t.)	0	3	3

- Teams were re-seeded each round.
- The winners of the reclassification matches were seeded based on their regular season position.
- The team with more goals on aggregate after two matches advanced.
- If the two teams were tied on aggregate, the higher seeded team advanced (the away goals rule was not applied).
- In the final, if the two teams were tied after both legs, they went to extra time and, if necessary, a penalty shoot-out.
- Both finalists qualified for the 2024 CONCACAF Champions Cup.

==== Quarterfinals ====
Team 1	Agg.	Team 2	1st leg	2nd leg
Santos Laguna	0–2	Monterrey	0–0	2–0
Atlético San Luis	3–4	América	1–3	2–1
Atlas	1–1 (s)	Guadalajara	1–0	0–1
UANL	5–4	Toluca	4–1	1–3

==== Semifinals ====
Team 1	Agg.	Team 2	1st leg	2nd leg
UANL	2–1	Monterrey	1–1	1–0
Guadalajara	3–2	América	0–1	3–1

==== Finals ====
Team 1	Agg.	Team 2	1st leg	2nd leg
UANL	3–2	Guadalajara	0–0	3–2 (a.e.t.)

25 May 2023
20:00 CST (UTC−6)

UANL	0–0	Guadalajara
	Report

Estadio Universitario, San Nicolás de los Garza
Attendance: 41,615
Referee: Fernando Guerrero (Mexico City)

28 May 2023
19:35 CST (UTC−6)

Guadalajara	2–3 (a.e.t.)	UANL
Alvarado 11'; Guzmán 20'	Report	Gignac 65' (pen.); Córdova 71'; Pizarro 110'

Estadio Akron, Zapopan
Attendance: 42,182
Referee: César Arturo Ramos (Sinaloa)

UANL won 3–2 on aggregate.

== Awards ==
Award	Winner	Cluba
Balón de Oro	(Mexico) Henry Martín	América
Best Goalkeeper	(Argentina) Nahuel Guzmán	UANL
Best center-back	(Mexico) Víctor Guzmán	Monterrey
Best full-back	(Mexico) Kevin Álvarez	Pachuca
Best defensive midfielder	(Mexico) Luis Chávez	Pachuca
Best offensive midfielder	(Chile) Diego Valdés	América
Best Forward	(Mexico) Henry Martín	América
Top Goalscorer of the Season	(Mexico) Henry Martín (27 goals)	América
Rookie of the Year	(Mexico) Emilio Lara	América
Manager of the Year	(Uruguay) Guillermo Almada	Pachuca
Best Goal	(France) André-Pierre Gignac	UANL

== Coefficient table ==
As of the 2020–21 season, the promotion and relegation between Liga MX and Liga de Expansión MX (formerly known as Ascenso MX) was suspended, however, the coefficient table was used to establish the payment of fines that would be used for the development of the clubs of the silver circuit.

Per Article 24 of the competition regulations, the payment of MXN$160 million was distributed among the last three positioned in the coefficient table as follows: MXN$80 million in the last place; MXN$47 million the penultimate; and MXN$33 million was paid by the sixteenth team in the table, as of the 2021–22 season the remaining MXN$80 million was paid through the financial remnants generated by the Liga MX itself. The team that finished last on the table started the following season with a coefficient of zero. If the last ranked team, which was Juárez, repeated as the last ranked team in the 2022–23 season coefficient table, they would be fined an additional MXN$20 million.

Pos	Team	'20 G Pts	'21 G Pts	'21 A Pts	'22 C Pts	'22 A Pts	'23 C Pts	Total Pts	Total Pld	Avg	GD	Fine
1	América	32	38	35	26	38	34	203	102	1.9902	+75	Safe from paying any fine
2	Monterrey	29	28	22	26	35	40	180	102	1.7647	+58	Safe from paying any fine
3	UANL	28	23	28	33	30	25	167	102	1.6373	+45	Safe from paying any fine
4	León	40	26	29	21	22	30	168	102	1.6471	+22	Safe from paying any fine
5	Pachuca	25	23	18	38	32	31	167	102	1.6373	+39	Safe from paying any fine
6	Cruz Azul	29	41	23	25	24	24	166	102	1.6275	+20	Safe from paying any fine
7	Guadalajara	26	23	22	26	22	34	153	102	1.5000	+19	Safe from paying any fine
8	Santos Laguna	25	26	24	20	33	19	147	102	1.4412	+19	Safe from paying any fine
9	Toluca	21	22	24	19	27	32	142	102	1.4216	+1	Safe from paying any fine
10	Puebla	20	28	24	26	22	20	140	102	1.3725	+10	Safe from paying any fine
11	Atlas	14	25	29	27	13	21	129	102	1.2647	+9	Safe from paying any fine
12	UNAM	32	18	21	22	14	18	125	102	1.2255	–11	Safe from paying any fine
13	Atlético San Luis	0	0	20	23	18	19	80	68	1.1765	–18	Safe from paying any fine
14	Necaxa	24	11	20	23	19	14	111	102	1.0882	–40	Safe from paying any fine
16	Juárez	0	0	0	0	19	15	34	34	1.0000	–9	Safe from paying any fine
15	Mazatlán (F)	16	21	20	21	17	7	102	102	1.0000	–53	MXN$33 million
17	Tijuana (F)	15	20	15	17	17	16	100	102	0.9804	–62	MXN$47 million
18	Querétaro (F)	13	21	15	17	9	20	95	102	0.9314	–44	MXN$80 million

Rules for fine payment: 1) Fine coefficient; 2) Goal difference; 3) Number of goals scored; 4) Head-to-head results between tied teams; 5) Number of goals scored away; 6) Fair Play points
F = Team had to pay fine indicated
Source: Liga MX

1. 2020–21 accumulated points are not counted towards their relegation coefficient.
2. 2020–21 and 2021–22 accumulated points are not counted towards their relegation coefficient.

== Aggregate tables ==
=== CONCACAF Champions Cup ===
The 2023–24 aggregate table (the sum of points of both the Apertura 2023 and Clausura 2024 seasons) is used to determine the participants for the 2024 CONCACAF Champions Cup. The league champions with more aggregate points at the end of the Apertura 2022 and Clausura 2023 seasons qualified directly to the 2024 CONCACAF Champions Cup round of 16 while the champion with fewer points at the end of the season qualified for the 2024 CONCACAF Champions Cup first round. In addition, both runners-up of the Apertura and Clausura and the next two best-ranked teams also qualified for the 2024 CONCACAF Champions Cup first round.

Pos	Team	Pld	W	D	L	GF	GA	GD	Pts	Qualification or relegation
1	Monterrey	34	23	6	5	64	27	+37	75	Qualification for the CONCACAF Champions Cup first round
2	América	34	21	9	4	74	38	+36	72	Qualification for the CONCACAF Champions Cup first round
3	Pachuca (A)	34	19	6	9	60	39	+21	63	Qualification for the CONCACAF Champions Cup round of 16
4	Toluca	34	16	11	7	61	42	+19	59	Qualification for the CONCACAF Champions Cup first round
5	Guadalajara	34	15	11	8	47	35	+12	56	Qualification for the CONCACAF Champions Cup first round
6	UANL (C)	34	16	7	11	44	31	+13	55	Qualification for the CONCACAF Champions Cup first round
7	León	34	14	10	10	48	42	+6	52	
8	Santos Laguna	34	15	7	12	61	58	+3	52	
9	Cruz Azul	34	14	6	14	47	56	−9	48	
10	Puebla	34	10	12	12	51	55	−4	42	
11	Atlético San Luis	34	9	10	15	31	44	−13	37	
12	Atlas	34	7	13	14	43	49	−6	34	
13	Juárez	34	7	13	14	34	43	−9	34	
14	Necaxa	34	8	9	17	35	50	−15	33	
15	Tijuana	34	7	12	15	37	59	−22	33	
16	UNAM	34	7	11	16	45	63	−18	32	
17	Querétaro	34	5	14	15	34	56	−22	29	
18	Mazatlán	34	5	9	20	36	65	−29	24	

Source: Liga MX
Rules for classification: 1) Points; 2) Goal difference; 3) Number of goals scored; 4) Head-to-head results between tied teams; 5) Number of goals scored away; 6) Highest relegation coefficient; 7) Fair Play points
(A) Apertura champion; (C) Clausura champion

=== Leagues Cup ===
The league champion with the highest aggregate points accumulated across the Clausura 2022 and Apertura 2022 seasons qualified directly to the 2023 Leagues Cup round of 32. Liga MX clubs ranked 2 to 16 in the aggregate table were put in the second position in each group, opposite the MLS Supporter's Shield table (for example, the best remaining team in the Supporter's Shield table not earning a bye was drawn against the lowest-best remaining team in the Liga MX 2022 aggregate table). The remaining 13 MLS clubs, along with the two remaining Liga MX clubs, were drawn into groups and divided geographically.

Pos	Team	Pld	W	D	L	GF	GA	GD	Pts	Qualification
1	Pachuca (A)	34	21	7	6	58	30	+28	70	Qualification for the Leagues Cup round of 32
2	América	34	19	7	8	62	34	+28	64	Qualification for the 2023 Leagues Cup group stage as seeded
3	UANL	34	19	6	9	54	34	+20	63	Qualification for the 2023 Leagues Cup group stage as seeded
4	Monterrey	34	17	10	7	50	30	+20	61	Qualification for the 2023 Leagues Cup group stage as seeded
5	Santos Laguna	34	15	8	11	63	46	+17	53	Qualification for the 2023 Leagues Cup group stage as seeded
6	Cruz Azul	34	14	7	13	46	51	−5	49	Qualification for the 2023 Leagues Cup group stage as seeded
7	Puebla	34	11	15	8	50	42	+8	48	Qualification for the 2023 Leagues Cup group stage as seeded
8	Guadalajara	34	12	12	10	44	38	+6	48	Qualification for the 2023 Leagues Cup group stage as seeded
9	Toluca	34	12	10	12	48	59	−11	46	Qualification for the 2023 Leagues Cup group stage as seeded
10	León	34	11	10	13	42	51	−9	43	Qualification for the 2023 Leagues Cup group stage as seeded
11	Necaxa	34	12	6	16	40	47	−7	42	Qualification for the 2023 Leagues Cup group stage as seeded
12	Atlético San Luis	34	11	8	15	36	45	−9	41	Qualification for the 2023 Leagues Cup group stage as seeded
13	Atlas	34	10	10	14	37	42	−5	40	Qualification for the 2023 Leagues Cup group stage as seeded
14	Mazatlán	34	9	11	14	37	48	−11	38	Qualification for the 2023 Leagues Cup group stage as seeded
15	UNAM	34	8	12	14	45	52	−7	36	Qualification for the 2023 Leagues Cup group stage as seeded
16	Tijuana	34	8	10	16	32	56	−24	34	Qualification for the 2023 Leagues Cup group stage as seeded
17	Juárez	34	7	9	18	27	46	−19	30	Qualification for the 2023 Leagues Cup group stage as unseeded
18	Querétaro	34	4	14	16	36	56	−20	26	Qualification for the 2023 Leagues Cup group stage as unseeded

Source: Clausura Apertura
Rules for classification: 1) Points; 2) Goal difference; 3) Number of goals scored; 4) Head-to-head results between tied teams; 5) Number of goals scored away; 6) Highest relegation coefficient; 7) Fair Play points
(A) Apertura champion

== See also ==
- 2022–23 Liga de Expansión MX season
- 2022–23 Liga MX Femenil season
- 2022 Copa Sky
- 2023 Campeón de Campeones
