= Guardianes 2021 Liga MX final phase =

The Torneo Guardianes 2021 (stylized as Guard1anes) Liga MX final phase was played between 8 May 2021 to 30 May 2021. A total of 12 teams competed in the final phase to decide the champions of the Guardianes 2021 Liga MX season. For the second straight season, an additional qualifying round, the reclassification or repechaje, was employed, which expanded the number of playoff spots to 12.

Both finalists qualified to the 2022 CONCACAF Champions League.

== Qualified teams ==
The following teams qualified for the championship stage.

In the following tables, the number of appearances, last appearance, and previous best result count only those in the short tournament era starting from Invierno 1996 (not counting those in the long tournament era from 1943–44 to 1995–96).

Qualified directly to quarter-finals (4 teams)
Seed	Team	Points (GD)	Date of qualification	Appearance	Last appearance	Previous best	Ref.
1	Cruz Azul	41	20 March 2021	30th	Guardianes 2020	Champions (Invierno 1997)	
2	América	38	3 April 2021	35th	Guardianes 2020	Champions (5 times)	
3	Puebla	28 (+11)	17 April 2021	9th	Guardianes 2020	Semifinals (3 times)	
4	Monterrey	28 (+9)	16 April 2021	25th	Guardianes 2020	Champions (4 times)	

Qualified to Reclassification round (8 teams)
Seed	Team	Points (GD)	Date of qualification	Appearance	Last appearance	Previous best	Ref.
5	Santos Laguna	26 (+5)	18 April 2021	32nd	Guardianes 2020	Champions (6 times)	
6	León	26 (+2)	30 April 2021	13th	Guardianes 2020	Champions (3 times)	
7	Atlas	25	30 April 2021	22nd	Apertura 2017	Runners-up (Verano 1999)	
8	Pachuca	23 (+1)	29 April 2021	23rd	Guardianes 2020	Champions (6 times)	
9	Guadalajara	23 (0)	1 May 2021	27th	Guardianes 2020	Champions (3 times)	
10	UANL	23 (–1)	1 May 2021	27th	Guardianes 2020	Champions (5 times)	
11	Toluca	22	1 May 2021	34th	Guardianes 2020	Champions (7 times)	
12	Querétaro	21	2 May 2021	12th (Note: Includes the appearances of the original Jaguares de Chiapas franchise (2002–2013), which is how the franchise was previously known as.)	Apertura 2019	Runners-up (Clausura 2015)	

== Format ==
=== Reclassification ===
- All rounds will be played in a single-leg hosted by the higher seed
- If a game ends in a draw, it will proceed directly to a penalty shoot-out.

=== Liguilla ===
- Teams are re-seeded after each round.
- The winners of the Reclassification matches are seeded based on their ranking in the classification table.
- Team with more goals on aggregate after two matches advance.
- Away goals rule is applied in the quarter-finals and semi-finals, but not the final.
- In the quarter-finals and semi-finals, if the two teams are tied on aggregate and away goals, the higher seeded team advances.
- In the final, if the two teams are tied after both legs, the match will go to extra time and, if necessary, a shoot-out.
- Both finalists will qualify to the 2022 CONCACAF Champions League.

== Reclassification ==
=== Summary ===
Matches took place on 8–9 May 2021.

Team 1	Score	Team 2
Santos Laguna	5–0	Querétaro
León	2–2 (2–4 p)	Toluca
Atlas	1–0	UANL
Pachuca	4–2	Guadalajara

=== Matches ===
8 May 2021
19:00 CDT (UTC−6)

Atlas	1–0	UANL
Furch 80'	Report

Estadio Jalisco, Guadalajara
Attendance: 11,341
Referee: César Arturo Ramos (Sinaloa)

8 May 2021
21:15 CDT (UTC−6)

Santos Laguna	5–0	Querétaro
Gorriarán 21'; Preciado 24'; Aguirre 49', 62'; Valdés 60' (pen.)	Report

Estadio Corona, Torreón
Attendance: 6,206
Referee: Fernando Hernández Gómez (Mexico City)

9 May 2021
19:00 CDT (UTC−6)

León	2–2	Toluca
Dávila 45+1'; Ambríz 89'	Report	Castañeda 17'; Canelo 58'
Penalties
Moreno (penalty scored); Godínez (penalty scored); Campbell (penalty missed); Dávila (penalty missed)	2–4	(penalty scored) Ortega; (penalty scored) Canelo; (penalty scored) Diego; (penalty scored) Sambueza

Estadio León, León
Attendance: 7,637
Referee: Luis Enrique Santander (Guanajuato)

9 May 2021
21:15 CDT (UTC−6)

Pachuca	4–2	Guadalajara
Murillo 51', 80'; de la Rosa 69', 89'	Report	Antuna 10', 90+3' (pen.)

Estadio Hidalgo, Pachuca
Attendance: 9,768
Referee: Marco Antonio Ortiz (Durango)

== Seeding ==
The following was the final seeding for the final phase. The winners of the Reclassification matches were seeded based on their position in the classification table.

Seed	Team	Pld	W	D	L	GF	GA	GD	Pts
1	Cruz Azul	17	13	2	2	26	11	+15	41
2	América	17	12	2	3	26	14	+12	38
3	Puebla	17	7	7	3	25	14	+11	28
4	Monterrey	17	8	4	5	22	13	+9	28
5	Santos Laguna	17	7	5	5	18	13	+5	26
6	Atlas	17	7	4	6	20	15	+5	25
7	Pachuca	17	6	5	6	20	19	+1	23
8	Toluca	17	6	4	7	26	24	+2	22

Source: Liga MX
Rules for classification: 1) Points; 2) Goal difference; 3) Goals scored; 4) Away goals scored; 5) Drawing of lots.

== Bracket ==
Quarter-finals
1	Cruz Azul	1	3	4
8	Toluca	2	1	3
2	América	1	4	5
7	Pachuca (a)	3	2	5
3	Puebla (s)	0	1	1
6	Atlas	1	0	1
4	Monterrey	1	1	2
5	Santos Laguna	2	1	3

Semi-finals
1	Cruz Azul	0	1	1
7	Pachuca	0	0	0
3	Puebla	0	1	1
5	Santos Laguna	3	0	3

Finals
1	Cruz Azul	1	1	2
5	Santos Laguna	0	1	1

== Quarter-finals ==
=== Summary ===
The first legs were played on 12–13 May, and the second legs were played on 15–16 May.

Team 1	Agg.	Team 2	1st leg	2nd leg
Toluca	3–4	Cruz Azul	2–1	1–3
Pachuca	5–5 (a)	América	3–1	2–4
Atlas	1–1 (s)	Puebla	1–0	0–1
Santos Laguna	3–2	Monterrey	2–1	1–1

=== Matches ===
==== First leg ====
12 May 2021
19:00 CDT (UTC−6)

Toluca	2–1	Cruz Azul
Canelo 27' (pen.); Estrada 52' (pen.)	Report	Fernández 34'

Estadio Nemesio Díez, Toluca
Attendance: 6,410
Referee: Marco Antonio Ortiz (Durango)

12 May 2021
21:05 CDT (UTC−6)

Atlas	1–0	Puebla
Torres 59'	Report

Estadio Jalisco, Guadalajara
Attendance: 15,221
Referee: Luis Enrique Santander (Guanajuato)

13 May 2021
19:00 CDT (UTC−6)

Pachuca	3–1	América
Aguirre 29'; Pardo 65'; Chávez 90+4'	Report	Suárez 45+2'

Estadio Hidalgo, Pachuca
Attendance: 9,053
Referee: Eduardo Galván Basulto (Mexico City)

13 May 2021
21:05 CDT (UTC−6)

Santos Laguna	2–1	Monterrey
Aguirre 52'; Preciado 63'	Report	Janssen 19'

Estadio Corona, Torreón
Attendance: 9,667
Referee: Jorge Isaac Rojas (Mexico City)

==== Second leg ====
15 May 2021
18:00 CDT (UTC−6)

Puebla	1–0	Atlas
Santamaría 70' (o.g.)	Report

Estadio Cuauhtémoc, Puebla
Attendance: 11,432
Referee: Diego Montaño Robles (Jalisco)

1–1 on aggregate and tied on away goals. Puebla advanced due to being the higher seed in the classification table.

15 May 2021
20:05 CDT (UTC−6)

Cruz Azul	3–1	Toluca
Angulo 11'; Rodríguez 80' (pen.); Giménez 90+3'	Report	Canelo 14'

Estadio Azteca, Mexico City
Attendance: 17,929
Referee: Fernando Hernández Gómez (Mexico City)

Cruz Azul won 4–3 on aggregate.

16 May 2021
18:00 CDT (UTC−6)

Monterrey	1–1	Santos Laguna
Meza 30'	Report	Prieto 90+1'

Estadio BBVA, Guadalupe
Attendance: 15,743
Referee: César Arturo Ramos (Sinaloa)

Santos Laguna won 3–2 on aggregate.

16 May 2021
20:05 CDT (UTC−6)

América	4–2	Pachuca
Martínez 17' (pen.), 53'; Fuentes 27'; Suárez 73'	Report	Ibarra 5'; Cabral 63' (pen.)

Estadio Azteca, Mexico City
Attendance: 16,564
Referee: Fernando Guerrero (Mexico City)

5–5 on aggregate. Pachuca won on away goals.

== Semi-finals ==
=== Summary ===
The first legs will be played on 19–20 May, and the second legs will be played on 22–23 May.

Team 1	Agg.	Team 2	1st leg	2nd leg
Pachuca	0–1	Cruz Azul	0–0	0–1
Santos Laguna	3–1	Puebla	3–0	0–1

=== Matches ===
==== First leg ====
19 May 2021
20:30 CDT (UTC−6)

Pachuca	0–0	Cruz Azul
	Report

Estadio Hidalgo, Pachuca
Attendance: 12,221
Referee: Luis Enrique Santander (Guanajuato)

20 May 2021
21:00 CDT (UTC−6)

Santos Laguna	3–0	Puebla
Aguirre 1', 27'; Preciado 72'	Report

Estadio Corona, Torreón
Attendance: 13,132
Referee: Marco Antonio Ortiz (Durango)

==== Second leg ====
22 May 2021
20:00 CDT (UTC−6)

Cruz Azul	1–0	Pachuca
Giménez 51'	Report

Estadio Azteca, Mexico City
Attendance: 19,708
Referee: César Arturo Ramos (Sinaloa)

Cruz Azul won 1–0 on aggregate.

23 May 2021
19:00 CDT (UTC−6)

Puebla	1–0	Santos Laguna
Ormeño 54'	Report

Estadio Cuauhtémoc, Puebla
Attendance: 18,604
Referee: Fernando Guerrero (Mexico City)

Santos Laguna won 3–1 on aggregate.

== Finals ==
=== Summary ===
The first leg was played on 27 May, and the second leg was played on 30 May.

Team 1	Agg.	Team 2	1st leg	2nd leg
Santos Laguna	1–2	Cruz Azul	0–1	1–1

=== Matches ===
==== First leg ====
27 May 2021
21:00 CDT (UTC−6)

Santos Laguna	0–1	Cruz Azul
	Report	Romo 71'

Estadio Corona, Torreón
Attendance: 14,577
Referee: Fernando Guerrero (Mexico City)

==== Details ====
Santos Laguna	Cruz Azul

GK	1	(Mexico) Carlos Acevedo (c)
DF	8	(Mexico) Carlos Orrantia	(substituted off) 83'
DF	5	(Ecuador) Félix Torres
DF	21	(Brazil) Dória
DF	190	(Mexico) Omar Campos
MF	11	(Uruguay) Fernando Gorriarán	(substituted off) 77'
MF	6	(Mexico) Alan Cervantes
MF	7	(Colombia) Juan Ferney Otero
MF	10	(Chile) Diego Valdés
MF	32	(Ecuador) Ayrton Preciado	(substituted off) 77'
FW	19	(Mexico) Eduardo Aguirre	(substituted off) 87'
Substitutions:
GK	25	(Mexico) Gibrán Lajud
DF	3	(Mexico) Ismael Govea
DF	20	(Mexico) Hugo Rodríguez
MF	14	(Mexico) David Andrade
MF	22	(Mexico) Ronaldo Prieto
MF	23	(Colombia) Andrés Ibargüen	(substituted on) 77'
MF	27	(Mexico) Jesús Isijara	(substituted on) 83'
FW	12	(Mexico) Alberto Ocejo
FW	30	(Chile) Ignacio Jeraldino	(substituted on) 87'
FW	192	(Mexico) Santiago Muñóz	(substituted on) 77'
Manager:
(Uruguay) Guillermo Almada

GK	1	(Mexico) José de Jesús Corona (c)
DF	24	(Paraguay) Juan Escobar
DF	23	(Paraguay) Pablo Aguilar
DF	4	(Mexico) Julio César Domínguez
DF	16	(Mexico) Adrián Aldrete	(substituted off) 86'
MF	22	(Mexico) Rafael Baca
MF	15	(Uruguay) Ignacio Rivero	(substituted off) 70'
MF	7	(Mexico) Luis Romo	(substituted off) 86'
MF	28	(Argentina) Guillermo Fernández	(substituted off) 78'
MF	19	(Peru) Yoshimar Yotún	(substituted off) 70'
FW	21	(Uruguay) Jonathan Rodríguez
Substitutions:
GK	33	(Mexico) Sebastián Jurado
DF	3	(Mexico) Jaiber Jiménez
DF	5	(Mexico) Alexis Peña
DF	12	(Mexico) José Joaquín Martínez	(substituted on) 78'
MF	11	(Mexico) Elías Hernández	(substituted on) 86'
MF	14	(Mexico) Misael Domínguez
MF	20	(Mexico) Alexis Gutiérrez
MF	31	(Mexico) Orbelín Pineda	(substituted on) 70'
MF	9	(Argentina) Walter Montoya	(substituted on) 70'
FW	29	(Mexico) Santiago Giménez	(substituted on) 86'
Manager:
(Peru) Juan Reynoso

Assistant referees:
Michel Alejandro Morales (Mexico City)
José Ibrahim Martínez (Guerrero)
Fourth official:
Diego Montaño Robles (Jalisco)
Video assistant referee:
Jorge Isaac Rojas (Mexico City)
Assistant video assistant referee:
Gerardo Martínez Bravo (Guanajuato)

==== Statistics ====
Statistic	Santos Laguna	Cruz Azul
Goals scored	0	1
Total shots	16	8
Shots on target	1	4
Saves	3	1
Ball possession	65%	35%
Corner kicks	9	8
Fouls committed	5	13
Offsides	1	0
Yellow cards	0	0
Red cards	0	0

==== Second leg ====
30 May 2021
20:15 CDT (UTC−6)

Cruz Azul	1–1	Santos Laguna
Rodríguez 51'	Report	Valdés 37'

Estadio Azteca, Mexico City
Attendance: 21,016
Referee: Fernando Hernández Gómez (Mexico City)

Cruz Azul won 2–1 on aggregate.

==== Details ====
Cruz Azul	Santos Laguna

GK	1	(Mexico) José de Jesús Corona (c)
DF	24	(Paraguay) Juan Escobar
DF	23	(Paraguay) Pablo Aguilar
DF	4	(Mexico) Julio César Domínguez
DF	15	(Uruguay) Ignacio Rivero		(substituted off) 83'
MF	22	(Mexico) Rafael Baca
MF	31	(Mexico) Orbelín Pineda		(substituted off) 46'
MF	7	(Mexico) Luis Romo
MF	28	(Argentina) Guillermo Fernández		(substituted off) 63'
MF	25	(Mexico) Roberto Alvarado		(substituted off) 46'
FW	21	(Uruguay) Jonathan Rodríguez		(substituted off) 87'
Substitutions:
GK	33	(Mexico) Sebastián Jurado
DF	5	(Mexico) Alexis Peña
DF	12	(Mexico) José Joaquín Martínez		(substituted on) 87'
DF	16	(Mexico) Adrián Aldrete		(substituted on) 63'
MF	11	(Mexico) Elías Hernández
MF	14	(Mexico) Misael Domínguez
MF	19	(Peru) Yoshimar Yotún		(substituted on) 46'
MF	9	(Argentina) Walter Montoya		(substituted on) 83'
FW	17	(Ecuador) Brayan Angulo
FW	29	(Mexico) Santiago Giménez	(yellow card) 90+10'	(substituted on) 46'
Manager:
(Peru) Juan Reynoso

GK	1	(Mexico) Carlos Acevedo (c)
DF	8	(Mexico) Carlos Orrantia
DF	5	(Ecuador) Félix Torres
DF	21	(Brazil) Dória	(yellow card) 90+10'
DF	190	(Mexico) Omar Campos
MF	11	(Uruguay) Fernando Gorriarán		(substituted off) 56'
MF	6	(Mexico) Alan Cervantes
MF	7	(Colombia) Juan Ferney Otero		(substituted off) 78'
MF	10	(Chile) Diego Valdés
MF	32	(Ecuador) Ayrton Preciado		(substituted off) 69'
FW	19	(Mexico) Eduardo Aguirre		(substituted off) 70'
Substitutions:
GK	25	(Mexico) Gibrán Lajud
DF	3	(Mexico) Ismael Govea
DF	20	(Mexico) Hugo Rodríguez
MF	22	(Mexico) Ronaldo Prieto		(substituted on) 56'
MF	23	(Colombia) Andrés Ibargüen		(substituted on) 69'
MF	27	(Mexico) Jesús Isijara
MF	202	(Mexico) Jordan Carrillo
FW	12	(Mexico) Alberto Ocejo		(substituted on) 78'
FW	30	(Chile) Ignacio Jeraldino
FW	192	(Mexico) Santiago Muñóz		(substituted on) 70'
Manager:
(Uruguay) Guillermo Almada

Assistant referees:
Alberto Morín Méndez (Chihuahua)
Karen Janet Díaz (Aguascalientes)
Fourth official:
Luis Enrique Santander (Guanajuato)
Video assistant referee:
Erick Yair Miranda (Guanajuato)
Assistant video assistant referee:
Marcos Quintero Huitrón (Jalisco)

==== Statistics ====
Statistic	Cruz Azul	Santos Laguna
Goals scored	1	1
Total shots	9	11
Shots on target	3	1
Saves	0	2
Ball possession	36%	64%
Corner kicks	6	8
Fouls committed	13	11
Offsides	0	0
Yellow cards	1	1
Red cards	0	0

== Statistics ==
=== Goalscorers ===
There were 48 goals scored in 18 matches, for an average of 2.67 goals per match.

5 goals

- (Mexico) Eduardo Aguirre (Santos Laguna)

3 goals

- (Argentina) Alexis Canelo (Toluca)
- (Ecuador) Ayrton Preciado (Santos Laguna)

2 goals

- (Mexico) Uriel Antuna (Guadalajara)
- (Mexico) Roberto de la Rosa (Pachuca)
- (Mexico) Santiago Giménez (Cruz Azul)
- (Colombia) Roger Martínez (América)
- (Colombia) Óscar Murillo (Pachuca)
- (Uruguay) Jonathan Rodríguez (Cruz Azul)
- (Argentina) Leonardo Suárez (América)
- (Chile) Diego Valdés (Santos Laguna)

1 goal

- (Mexico) Érick Aguirre (Pachuca)
- (Mexico) Fidel Ambríz (León)
- (Ecuador) Brayan Angulo (Cruz Azul)
- (Argentina) Gustavo Cabral (Pachuca)
- (Mexico) Kevin Castañeda (Toluca)
- (Mexico) Luis Chávez (Pachuca)
- (Chile) Víctor Dávila (León)
- (Ecuador) Michael Estrada (Toluca)
- (Argentina) Guillermo Fernández (Cruz Azul)
- (Mexico) Luis Fuentes (América)
- (Argentina) Julio Furch (Atlas)
- (Uruguay) Fernando Gorriarán (Santos Laguna)
- (Ecuador) Romario Ibarra (Pachuca)
- (Netherlands) Vincent Janssen (Monterrey)
- (Argentina) Maximiliano Meza (Monterrey)
- (Mexico) Santiago Ormeño (Puebla)
- (Colombia) Felipe Pardo (Pachuca)
- (Mexico) Ronaldo Prieto (Santos Laguna)
- (Mexico) Luis Romo (Cruz Azul)
- (Mexico) Jairo Torres (Atlas)

1 own goal

- (Peru) Anderson Santamaría (against Puebla)

=== Assists ===
3 assists

- (Argentina) Ismael Sosa (Pachuca)

2 assists

- (Uruguay) Jonathan Rodríguez (Cruz Azul)
- (Argentina) Rubens Sambueza (Toluca)
- (Chile) Diego Valdés (Santos Laguna)

1 assist

- (Mexico) Érick Aguirre (Pachuca)
- (Mexico) Roberto Alvarado (Cruz Azul)
- (Mexico) Jesús Angulo (Atlas)
- (Argentina) Alexis Canelo (Toluca)
- (Mexico) Alan Cervantes (Santos Laguna)
- (Mexico) Roberto de la Rosa (Pachuca)
- (Spain) Álvaro Fidalgo (América)
- (Uruguay) Fernando Gorriarán (Santos Laguna)
- (Mexico) Víctor Guzmán (Pachuca)
- (Argentina) Víctor Malcorra (Atlas)
- (Mexico) Henry Martín (América)
- (Colombia) Roger Martínez (América)
- (Ecuador) Ángel Mena (León)
- (Mexico) Carlos Orrantia (Santos Laguna)
- (Colombia) Juan Ferney Otero (Santos Laguna)
- (Ecuador) Ayrton Preciado (Santos Laguna)
- (Mexico) Luis Romo (Cruz Azul)
- (Mexico) Érick Sánchez (Pachuca)
- (Uruguay) Christian Tabó (Puebla)
- (Mexico) Alexis Vega (Guadalajara)
- (Peru) Yoshimar Yotún (Cruz Azul)
