= Ronaldo Prieto =

Mexican footballer (born 1997)

Personal information
- Full name: Ronaldo de Jesús Prieto Ramírez
- Date of birth: 3 March 1997 (age 29)
- Place of birth: Santiago Tuxtla, Veracruz, Mexico
- Height: 1.72 m (5 ft 8 in)
- Position: Midfielder

Team information
- Current team: Correcaminos
- Number: 21

Senior career*
| Years | Team | Apps | (Gls) |
| 2016–2019 | Veracruz | 15 | (0) |
| 2019 | → Tampico Madero (loan) | 19 | (6) |
| 2020–2025 | Santos Laguna | 67 | (1) |
| 2026– | Correcaminos | 0 | (0) |
- * Club domestic league appearances and goals as of 9 March 2024

Ronaldo de Jesús Prieto Ramírez (born 3 March 1997) is a Mexican professional footballer who plays as a midfielder for Liga de Expansión MX club Correcaminos.

== Career statistics ==
=== Club ===
As of match played 9 March 2024

| Club | Season | League | | | Cup | | Continental | | Other | | Total | |
| Club | Season | Division | Apps | Goals | Apps | Goals | Apps | Goals | Apps | Goals | Apps | Goals |
|---|---|---|---|---|---|---|---|---|---|---|---|---|
| Veracruz | 2018–19 | Liga MX | 15 | 0 | 1 | 1 | — | | — | | 16 | 1 |
| Tampico Madero (loan) | 2019–20 | Ascenso MX | 19 | 6 | — | | — | | — | | 19 | 6 |
| Santos Laguna | 2020–21 | Liga MX | 21 | 1 | — | | 2 (Note: Appearances in Leagues Cup) | 0 | — | | 23 | 1 |
| Santos Laguna | 2021–22 | Liga MX | 18 | 0 | — | | — | | — | | 18 | 0 |
| Santos Laguna | 2022–23 | Liga MX | 12 | 0 | — | | — | | — | | 12 | 0 |
| Santos Laguna | 2023–24 | Liga MX | 16 | 0 | — | | — | | — | | 16 | 0 |
| Santos Laguna | Total | | 67 | 1 | — | | 2 | 0 | — | | 69 | 1 |
| Career total | | | 101 | 7 | 1 | 1 | 2 | 0 | 0 | 0 | 104 | 8 |
