= 2020–21 Liga MX season =

74th professional season of the top-flight football league in Mexico

Liga MX
- Season: 2020–21
- Champions: Guard1anes 2020: León (8th title); Guard1anes 2021: Cruz Azul (9th title)
- Champions League: León; UNAM; Cruz Azul; Santos Laguna
- Matches: 306
- Goals: 753 (2.46 per match); Guard1anes 2020: 394 (2.58 per match); Guard1anes 2021: 359 (2.35 per match)
- Top goalscorer: Guard1anes 2020: Jonathan Rodríguez (12 goals); Guard1anes 2021: Alexis Canelo (11 goals)
- Biggest home win: Guard1anes 2020: América 4–0 Tijuana (1 August 2020); Santos Laguna 4–0 Mazatlán (8 November 2020); Guard1anes 2021: Puebla 4–0 Juárez (12 February 2021)
- Biggest away win: Guard1anes 2020: Atlético San Luis 0–5 Mazatlán (29 October 2020); Guard1anes 2021: Juárez 1–6 Monterrey (3 March 2021)
- Highest scoring: Guard1anes 2020: Pachuca 4–3 Mazatlán (24 August 2020); Guard1anes 2021: Toluca 4–4 Puebla (21 March 2021)
- Longest winning run: Guard1anes 2020: 7 matches León; Guard1anes 2021: 12 matches Cruz Azul
- Longest unbeaten run: Guard1anes 2020: 14 matches León; Guard1anes 2021: 15 matches Cruz Azul
- Longest winless run: Guard1anes 2020: 9 matches Querétaro; Guard1anes 2021: 10 matches Atlético San Luis
- Longest losing run: Guard1anes 2020: 5 matches Necaxa; Guard1anes 2021: 7 matches Atlético San Luis
- Highest attendance: Guard1anes 2020: 6,019; Mazatlán vs Monterrey (25 October 2020); Guard1anes 2021: 12,778; Puebla vs UNAM (23 April 2021)
- Total attendance: Guard1anes 2020: 11,066; Guard1anes 2021: 312,571 (45 matches)
- Average attendance: Guard1anes 2020: 614; Guard1anes 2021: 6,946
- Stats are from the regular season only Source: Liga MX

The 2020–21 Liga MX season was the 74th professional season of the highest level division of association football in Mexico. The season was divided into two short tournaments (Guard1anes 2020 and Guard1anes 2021), each with 18 participating clubs and the same format. Both tournaments were renamed as Guard1anes to honor healthcare workers in the aftermath of the COVID-19 pandemic in Mexico. The season began on 24 July 2020.

The season saw the debut of Mazatlán F.C., replacing Monarcas Morelia, who were relocated to Mazatlán, Sinaloa to become the new Mazatlán franchise, despite backlash from supporters, former players, and the sports media across Mexico. The season saw an expanded playoff system. Twelve teams qualified to the Liguilla instead of eight.

== Clubs ==
=== Stadiums and locations ===
Club	Location	Stadium	Capacity
América	Mexico City	Azteca	87,000
Atlas	Guadalajara, Jalisco	Jalisco	55,110
Atlético San Luis	San Luis Potosí, San Luis Potosí	Alfonso Lastras	25,709
Cruz Azul	Mexico City	Azteca	87,000
Guadalajara	Zapopan, Jalisco	Akron	45,364
Juárez	Ciudad Juárez, Chihuahua	Olímpico Benito Juárez	19,703
León	León, Guanajuato	León	31,297
Mazatlán	Mazatlán, Sinaloa	Mazatlán	25,000
Monterrey	Guadalupe, Nuevo León	BBVA	53,500
Necaxa	Aguascalientes, Aguascalientes	Victoria	23,851
Pachuca	Pachuca, Hidalgo	Hidalgo	27,512
Puebla	Puebla, Puebla	Cuauhtémoc	51,726
Querétaro	Querétaro, Querétaro	Corregidora	33,162
Santos Laguna	Torreón, Coahuila	Corona	29,237
Tijuana	Tijuana, Baja California	Caliente	27,333
Toluca	Toluca, State of Mexico	Nemesio Díez	31,000
UANL	San Nicolás de los Garza, Nuevo León	Universitario	41,886
UNAM	Mexico City	Olímpico Universitario	48,297

Locations of the 2020–21 Liga MX teams
Greater Mexico City Liga MX football clubs

=== Personnel and kits ===
Club	Chairman	Head coach	Captain	Kit manufacturer	Shirt sponsor(s)
América	Santiago Baños	(Argentina) Santiago Solari	(Mexico) Guillermo Ochoa	Nike	AT&T
Atlas	José Riestra	(Argentina) Diego Cocca	(Mexico) Aldo Rocha	Charly	Banco Azteca
Atlético San Luis	Alberto Marrero	(Uruguay) Leonel Rocco	(Uruguay) Camilo Mayada	Pirma	Canel's
Cruz Azul	Álvaro Dávila	(Peru) Juan Reynoso	(Mexico) José de Jesús Corona	Joma	Cemento Cruz Azul
Guadalajara	Amaury Vergara	(Mexico) Víctor Manuel Vucetich	(Mexico) Jesús Molina	Puma	Caliente
Juárez	Guillermo Cantú	(Mexico) Alfonso Sosa	(Paraguay) Darío Lezcano	Carrara	S-Mart
León	Jesús Martínez Murguia	(Mexico) Ignacio Ambríz	(Mexico) Luis Montes	Pirma	Cementos Fortaleza
Mazatlán	Mauricio Lanz González	(Mexico) Tomás Boy	(Chile) Rodrigo Millar	Pirma	Caliente
Monterrey	Duilio Davino	(Mexico) Javier Aguirre	(Colombia) Dorlan Pabón	Puma	AT&T
Necaxa	Ernesto Tinajero Flores	(Mexico) Guillermo Vázquez	(Mexico) David Cabrera	Pirma	Rolcar
Pachuca	Armando Martínez Patiño	(Uruguay) Paulo Pezzolano	(Mexico) Jorge Hernández	Charly	Cementos Fortaleza
Puebla	Manuel Jiménez García	(Argentina) Nicolás Larcamón	(Mexico) Javier Salas	Umbro	AT&T
Querétaro	Manuel Velarde	(Mexico) Héctor Altamirano	(Mexico) Gil Alcalá	Charly	Caliente
Santos Laguna	Dante Elizalde	(Uruguay) Guillermo Almada	(Brazil) Dória	Charly	Soriana
Tijuana	Jorge Hank Inzunsa	(Uruguay) Robert Siboldi	(Mexico) Jonathan Orozco	Charly	Caliente
Toluca	Francisco Suinaga	(Argentina) Hernán Cristante	(Mexico) Rubens Sambueza	Under Armour	Banamex
UANL	Alejandro Rodríguez	(Brazil) Ricardo Ferretti	(Argentina) Guido Pizarro	Adidas	Cemex
UNAM	Leopoldo Silva Gutiérrez	(Argentina) Andrés Lillini	(Mexico) Juan Pablo Vigón	Nike	DHL

=== Managerial changes ===
Club	Outgoing manager	Manner of departure	Date of vacancy	Replaced by	Date of appointment	Position in table	Ref.
Pre-Guard1anes 2020 changes
Querétaro	(Mexico) Víctor Manuel Vucetich	Mutual agreement termination	2 June 2020	(Mexico) Alex Diego	23 June 2020	Preseason	
Tijuana	(Bolivia) Gustavo Quinteros	Resigned	12 June 2020	(Argentina) Pablo Guede	19 June 2020	Preseason	
UNAM	(Spain) Míchel	Resigned	23 July 2020	(Argentina) Andrés Lillini (Interim)	23 July 2020	Preseason	
Guard1anes 2020
Guadalajara	(Mexico) Luis Fernando Tena	Sacked	9 August 2020	(Mexico) Marcelo Michel Leaño (Interim)	9 August 2020	17th	
Atlas	(Mexico) Rafael Puente Jr.	Sacked	10 August 2020	(Mexico) Rubén Duarte (Interim)	10 August 2020	16th	
Atlas	(Mexico) Rubén Duarte (Interim)	End of tenure as caretaker	14 August 2020	(Argentina) Diego Cocca	11 August 2020 (Note: Although appointed on 11 August 2020, Cocca would not immediately take charge. Due to league schedule and the mandatory COVID-19 testing, his first match was delayed to 22 August 2020 vs Querétaro.)	16th	
Guadalajara	(Mexico) Marcelo Michel Leaño (Interim)	End of tenure as caretaker	13 August 2020	(Mexico) Víctor Manuel Vucetich	13 August 2020	13th	
UNAM	(Argentina) Andrés Lillini (Interim)	Ratified as manager	17 August 2020	(Argentina) Andrés Lillini	17 August 2020	3rd	
Necaxa	(Mexico) Alfonso Sosa	Sacked	4 September 2020	(Mexico) José Guadalupe Cruz	6 September 2020	14th	
Toluca	(Mexico) José Manuel de la Torre	Sacked	28 September 2020	(Mexico) Carlos Adrián Morales (Interim)	28 September 2020	10th	
Mazatlán	(Mexico) Francisco Palencia	Sacked	3 October 2020	(Mexico) Tomás Boy	5 October 2020	17th	
Querétaro	(Mexico) Alex Diego	Sacked	26 October 2020	(Mexico) Héctor Altamirano	27 October 2020	17th	
Atlético San Luis	(Mexico) Guillermo Vázquez	Mutual agreement termination	30 October 2020	(Mexico) Luis Francisco García (Interim)	31 October 2020	18th	
Pre-Guard1anes 2021 changes
Atlético San Luis	(Mexico) Luis Francisco García (Interim)	End of tenure as caretaker	23 November 2020	(Uruguay) Leonel Rocco	23 November 2020	Preseason	
Monterrey	(Argentina) Antonio Mohamed	Mutual agreement termination	25 November 2020	(Mexico) Javier Aguirre	7 December 2020	Preseason	
Toluca	(Mexico) Carlos Adrián Morales (Interim)	End of tenure as caretaker	25 November 2020	(Argentina) Hernán Cristante	1 December 2020	Preseason	
Juárez	(Mexico) Gabriel Caballero	Sacked	26 November 2020	(Mexico) Luis Fernando Tena	28 November 2020	Preseason	
Puebla	(Peru) Juan Reynoso	Sacked	1 December 2020	(Argentina) Nicolás Larcamón	9 December 2020	Preseason	
Cruz Azul	(Uruguay) Robert Siboldi	Resigned	11 December 2020	(Mexico) Luis Armando González (Interim)	11 December 2020 (Note: The team was eliminated from Liga MX; however, Cruz Azul had to play in the CONCACAF Champions League, and an interim manager was appointed to finish the tournament.)	Preseason	
América	(Mexico) Miguel Herrera	Sacked	21 December 2020	(Argentina) Santiago Solari	29 December 2020	Preseason	
Cruz Azul	(Mexico) Luis Armando González (Interim)	End of tenure as caretaker	7 January 2021	(Peru) Juan Reynoso	7 January 2021	Preseason	
Guard1anes 2021 changes
Juárez	(Mexico) Luis Fernando Tena	Sacked	15 March 2021	(Mexico) Alfonso Sosa	17 March 2021	16th	
Necaxa	(Mexico) José Guadalupe Cruz	Sacked	16 March 2021	(Mexico) Guillermo Vázquez	18 March 2021	18th	
Tijuana	(Argentina) Pablo Guede	Mutual agreement	12 April 2021	(Mexico) Ildefonso Mendoza (Interim)	14 April 2021	11th	
Tijuana	(Mexico) Ildefonso Mendoza (Interim)	End of tenure as caretaker	19 April 2021	(Uruguay) Robert Siboldi	19 April 2021	15th	

== Torneo Guard1anes 2020 ==
The Apertura tournament was named Guard1anes 2020, in honour of the job healthcare workers have done during the COVID-19 pandemic in Mexico. The tournament began on 24 July 2020.

=== Regular phase ===
==== League table ====
Pos	Team	Pld	W	D	L	GF	GA	GD	Pts	Qualification
1	León (C)	17	12	4	1	27	14	+13	40	Qualification for the quarter-finals (Note: The first four places in the table qualified for the Liguilla quarter-finals.)
2	UNAM	17	8	8	1	29	17	+12	32	Qualification for the quarter-finals
3	América	17	9	5	3	31	22	+9	32	Qualification for the quarter-finals
4	Cruz Azul	17	9	2	6	23	16	+7	29	Qualification for the quarter-finals
5	Monterrey	17	8	5	4	26	21	+5	29	Qualification for the Reclassification (Note: Teams ranked 5th to 12th in the table qualified for Reclassification)
6	UANL	17	7	7	3	27	16	+11	28	Qualification for the Reclassification
7	Guadalajara	17	7	5	5	20	17	+3	26	Qualification for the Reclassification
8	Santos Laguna	17	7	4	6	24	20	+4	25	Qualification for the Reclassification
9	Pachuca	17	6	7	4	18	14	+4	25	Qualification for the Reclassification
10	Necaxa	17	7	3	7	16	20	−4	24	Qualification for the Reclassification
11	Toluca	17	6	3	8	23	28	−5	21	Qualification for the Reclassification
12	Puebla	17	6	2	9	22	25	−3	20	Qualification for the Reclassification
13	Juárez	17	4	7	6	16	19	−3	19	
14	Mazatlán	17	4	4	9	24	31	−7	16	
15	Tijuana	17	4	3	10	12	27	−15	15	
16	Atlas	17	3	5	9	13	20	−7	14	
17	Querétaro	17	3	4	10	23	28	−5	13	
18	Atlético San Luis	17	3	2	12	16	35	−19	11	

Source: Liga MX
Rules for classification: 1) Points; 2) Goal difference; 3) Number of goals scored; 4) Head-to-head results between tied teams; 5) Number of goals scored away; 6) Highest relegation coefficient; 7) Fair Play points
(C) Champions

==== Positions by round ====
Leader and qualification to Liguilla
Qualification to Liguilla
Qualification to Reclassification
Last place in table

Team ╲ Round	1	2	3	4	5	6	7	8	9	10	11	12	13	14	15	16	17
León	10	7	10	6	3	3	2	1	4	3	2	1	1	1	1	1	1
UNAM	7	1	1	1	1	4	4	4	3	4	3	3	3	5	4	2	3
América	6	2	4	3	4	5	3	2	1	1	4	4	4	2	3	3	2
Cruz Azul	5	5	3	5	2	1	1	3	2	2	1	2	2	4	2	4	4
Monterrey	3	8	7	9	11	7	5	6	6	7	7	8	6	6	6	5	5
UANL	2	4	5	2	6	8	9	10	10	8	6	5	5	3	5	6	6
Guadalajara	11	15	17	13	10	12	10	8	7	6	8	7	8	7	9	8	7
Santos Laguna	16	9	8	14	14	16	11	13	14	16	12	14	9	9	8	9	8
Pachuca	13	14	9	12	9	6	7	5	5	5	5	6	7	8	7	7	9
Necaxa	18	18	18	16	16	9	12	15	18	18	18	17	16	11	11	10	10
Toluca	14	10	13	7	5	2	6	7	8	10	11	10	10	10	10	11	11
Puebla	1	3	2	4	8	11	8	11	11	12	9	9	11	12	13	13	12
Juárez	8	6	6	10	13	14	15	16	12	9	10	11	12	13	12	12	13
Mazatlán	17	16	11	15	15	18	16	17	16	14	15	15	17	16	16	14	14
Tijuana	4	11	12	17	17	13	14	12	13	15	16	16	13	14	14	15	15
Atlas	15	17	16	18	18	17	18	14	15	13	14	12	14	15	15	16	16
Querétaro	12	12	15	11	7	10	13	9	9	11	13	13	15	17	17	17	17
Atlético San Luis	9	13	14	8	12	15	17	18	17	17	17	18	18	18	18	18	18

Source: Liga MX

=== Results ===
Teams played every other team once (either at home or away), completing a total of 17 rounds.

Home \ Away	AMÉ	ATL	ASL	CAZ	GUA	JUÁ	LEÓ	MAZ	MON	NEC	PAC	PUE	QUE	SAN	TIJ	TOL	UNL	UNM
América	—	1–0	—	—	1–0	—	—	3–1	1–3	—	—	—	—	3–1	4–0	1–1	3–1	2–2
Atlas	—	—	—	1–0	—	—	—	1–1	—	0–1	0–1	0–1	1–0	—	—	1–2	—	1–2
Atlético San Luis	1–2	1–1	—	1–3	—	1–1	0–2	0–5	1–2	2–1	—	—	2–1	—	—	—	—	—
Cruz Azul	0–0	—	—	—	—	3–2	2–0	—	—	3–0	1–0	—	—	2–0	—	—	0–2	1–2
Guadalajara	—	3–2	2–1	0–2	—	—	0–0	2–1	3–1	—	0–0	0–1	1–1	—	—	—	—	—
Juárez	1–1	0–1	—	—	0–2	—	0–0	—	—	1–0	1–1	1–1	1–0	1–1	—	—	—	—
León	3–2	2–1	—	—	—	—	—	2–1	1–0	—	—	—	—	2–1	2–1	—	1–1	2–0
Mazatlán	—	—	—	2–3	—	3–2	—	—	1–2	—	—	1–4	—	—	1–0	2–1	1–1	0–0
Monterrey	—	1–1	—	1–0	—	2–1	—	—	—	1–1	—	3–1	—	2–2	—	3–1	0–2	—
Necaxa	1–1	—	—	—	1–2	—	0–2	1–0	—	—	—	0–1	—	2–1	2–0	3–2	0–3	—
Pachuca	1–2	—	3–1	—	—	—	0–1	4–3	1–1	0–1	—	—	1–0	—	—	0–0	—	1–1
Puebla	2–3	—	1–0	1–1	—	—	1–2	—	—	—	0–1	—	3–3	0–2	—	4–1	—	—
Querétaro	4–1	—	—	1–0	—	—	2–3	1–1	1–2	0–1	—	—	—	—	2–2	4–1	—	—
Santos Laguna	—	0–0	2–1	—	2–0	—	—	4–0	—	—	1–1	—	2–1	—	2–0	—	—	1–2
Tijuana	—	3–1	0–2	1–2	0–0	2–1	—	—	2–1	—	0–2	1–0	—	—	—	—	0–0	—
Toluca	—	—	3–2	2–0	1–0	0–1	2–2	—	—	—	—	—	—	1–2	2–0	—	3–2	—
UANL	—	3–0	3–0	—	1–3	1–1	—	—	—	—	1–1	2–1	3–0	2–0	—	—	—	1–1
UNAM	—	—	3–0	—	2–2	1–1	—	—	1–1	1–1	—	4–1	3–2	—	3–0	1–0	—	—

Source: Liga MX
Legend: Blue = home team win; Yellow = draw; Red = away team win.

=== Individual statistics ===
- First goal of the season: (France) André-Pierre Gignac for Tigres UANL against Necaxa (25 July 2020)

==== Top goalscorers ====
Players sorted first by goals scored, then by last name.

Rank	Player	Club	Goals
1	(Uruguay) Jonathan Rodríguez	Cruz Azul	12
2	(France) André-Pierre Gignac	UANL	11
3	(Argentina) Juan Ignacio Dinenno	UNAM	10
3	(Paraguay) Darío Lezcano	Juárez	10
5	(Brazil) Camilo Sanvezzo	Mazatlán	8
6	(Mexico) Henry Martín	América	7
6	(Ecuador) Ángel Mena	León	7
8	(Argentina) Alexis Canelo	Toluca	6
8	(Argentina) Rogelio Funes Mori	Monterrey	6
8	(Uruguay) Nicolás López	UANL	6
8	(Mexico) Santiago Ormeño	Puebla	6
8	(Uruguay) Hugo Silveira	Querétaro	6
8	(Uruguay) Federico Viñas	América	6

Source: Liga MX

==== Hat-tricks ====
Player	For	Against	Result	Date
(Chile) Víctor Dávila	Pachuca	Atlético San Luis	3–1	3 September 2020
(Brazil) Camilo Sanvezzo	Mazatlán	Atlético San Luis	5–0	29 October 2020

=== Final phase ===
==== Reclassification ====
Team 1	Score	Team 2
Monterrey	2–2 (2–4 p)	Puebla
UANL	2–1	Toluca
Guadalajara	1–0	Necaxa
Santos Laguna	0–3	Pachuca

- All rounds were played in a single game hosted by the higher seed
- If a game ended in a draw, it proceeded directly to a penalty shoot-out.

==== Bracket ====
Quarter-finals
1	León	1	2	3
8	Puebla	2	0	2
3	América	0	1	1
6	Guadalajara	1	2	3
2	UNAM	1	0	1
7	Pachuca	0	0	0
4	Cruz Azul	3	0	3
5	UANL	1	1	2

Semi-finals
1	León	1	1	2
6	Guadalajara	1	0	1
2	UNAM (s)	0	4	4
4	Cruz Azul	4	0	4

Finals
1	León	1	2	3
2	UNAM	1	0	1

- Teams were re-seeded each round.
- The winners of the Reclassification matches were seeded based on their ranking in the classification table.
- Team with more goals on aggregate after two matches advanced.
- Away goals rule was applied in the quarter-finals and semi-finals, but not the final.
- In the quarter-finals and semi-finals, if the two teams were tied on aggregate and away goals, the higher seeded team advanced.
- In the final, if the two teams were tied after both legs, the match went to extra time and, if necessary, a shoot-out.
- Both finalists qualified to the 2022 CONCACAF Champions League.

==== Quarterfinals ====
Team 1	Agg.	Team 2	1st leg	2nd leg
Puebla	2–3	León	2–1	0–2
Pachuca	0–1	UNAM	0–1	0–0
Guadalajara	3–1	América	1–0	2–1
UANL	2–3	Cruz Azul	1–3	1–0

==== Semifinals ====
Team 1	Agg.	Team 2	1st leg	2nd leg
Guadalajara	1–2	León	1–1	0–1
Cruz Azul	4–4 (s)	UNAM	4–0	0–4

==== Finals ====
Team 1	Agg.	Team 2	1st leg	2nd leg
UNAM	1–3	León	1–1	0–2

== Torneo Guard1anes 2021 ==
The Clausura tournament was named Guard1anes 2021, in honour of the job healthcare workers have done during the COVID-19 pandemic in Mexico. The tournament began on 7 January 2021.

=== Regular phase ===
==== League table ====
Pos	Team	Pld	W	D	L	GF	GA	GD	Pts	Qualification
1	Cruz Azul (C)	17	13	2	2	26	11	+15	41	Qualification for the quarter-finals (Note: The first four places in the table qualified for the Liguilla quarter-finals.)
2	América	17	12	2	3	26	14	+12	38 (Note: América was penalized for having an ineligible player on the bench in their Week 7 match against Atlas. América originally won the match 0–2 but were docked the 3 points obtained for the victory. Atlas were given a 3–0 victory and the 3 points docked from América.)	Qualification for the quarter-finals
3	Puebla	17	7	7	3	25	14	+11	28	Qualification for the quarter-finals
4	Monterrey	17	8	4	5	22	13	+9	28	Qualification for the quarter-finals
5	Santos Laguna	17	7	5	5	18	13	+5	26	Qualification for the Reclassification (Note: Teams ranked 5th to 12th in the table qualified for Reclassification)
6	León	17	8	2	7	25	23	+2	26	Qualification for the Reclassification
7	Atlas	17	7	4	6	20	15	+5	25	Qualification for the Reclassification
8	Pachuca	17	6	5	6	20	19	+1	23	Qualification for the Reclassification
9	Guadalajara	17	5	8	4	21	21	0	23	Qualification for the Reclassification
10	UANL	17	6	5	6	19	20	−1	23	Qualification for the Reclassification
11	Toluca	17	6	4	7	26	24	+2	22	Qualification for the Reclassification
12	Querétaro	17	6	3	8	19	25	−6	21	Qualification for the Reclassification
13	Mazatlán	17	6	3	8	19	26	−7	21	
14	Tijuana	17	5	5	7	19	21	−2	20	
15	UNAM	17	4	6	7	10	12	−2	18	
16	Juárez	17	4	3	10	13	29	−16	15	
17	Atlético San Luis	17	3	3	11	20	33	−13	12	Team is last place in the coefficient table.
18	Necaxa	17	2	5	10	14	29	−15	11	

Source: Liga MX
Rules for classification: 1) Points; 2) Goal difference; 3) Number of goals scored; 4) Number of goals scored away; 5) Head-to-head results between tied teams; 6) Highest relegation coefficient; 7) Fair Play points
(C) Champions

==== Positions by round ====
Leader and qualification to Liguilla
Qualification to Liguilla
Qualification to Reclassification
Last place in table

Team ╲ Round	1	2	3	4	5	6	7	8	9	10	11	12	13	14	15	16	17
Cruz Azul	15	17	12	8	4	3	1	1	1	1	1	1	1	1	1	1	1
América	5	7	5	5	3	2	3	2	2	2	2	2	2	2	2	2	2
Puebla	10	5	9	11	13	8	10	6	5	6	7	7	6	4	3	3	3
Monterrey	2	1	3	4	2	6	6	7	4	3	4	4	3	3	4	4	4
Santos Laguna	6	2	2	1	5	5	5	3	6	5	3	3	4	5	5	5	5
León	17	15	17	13	15	17	14	15	17	15	14	9	8	7	6	6	6
Atlas	18	18	18	18	18	15	11	13	8	7	6	6	5	6	7	8	7
Pachuca	9	13	14	16	17	18	18	18	18	17	15	12	11	14	14	13	8
Guadalajara	7	11	15	17	11	12	13	10	9	9	13	16	15	15	9	9	9
UANL	3	8	4	6	8	10	8	9	11	11	12	14	10	9	10	10	10
Toluca	1	4	1	3	1	1	2	4	3	4	5	5	7	8	8	7	11
Querétaro	16	9	6	9	7	7	9	11	12	12	8	10	12	10	11	11	12
Mazatlán	4	10	10	7	9	11	15	12	13	13	9	11	13	11	12	12	13
Tijuana	12	14	7	2	6	4	4	5	7	8	10	8	9	12	15	14	14
UNAM	11	3	8	10	10	13	17	17	14	14	16	15	14	13	13	15	15
Juárez	8	12	16	12	12	16	12	14	15	16	17	18	18	16	17	17	16
Atlético San Luis	14	16	11	15	14	9	7	8	10	10	11	13	16	17	16	16	17
Necaxa	13	6	13	14	16	14	16	16	16	18	18	17	17	18	18	18	18

Source: Liga MX

=== Results ===
Teams played every other team once (either at home or away), completing a total of 17 rounds.

Home \ Away	AMÉ	ATL	ASL	CAZ	GUA	JUÁ	LEÓ	MAZ	MON	NEC	PAC	PUE	QUE	SAN	TIJ	TOL	UNL	UNM
América	—	—	2–1	1–1	—	2–0	2–1	—	—	2–1	2–0	1–0	2–1	—	—	—	—	—
Atlas	3–0^{w/o}	—	3–1	—	0–1	2–0	1–3	—	0–2	—	—	—	—	1–1	1–0	—	0–2	—
Atlético San Luis	—	—	—	—	3–1	—	—	—	—	—	1–5	1–4	—	1–0	2–2	0–0	2–2	0–1
Cruz Azul	—	3–2	3–2	—	1–0	—	—	1–0	1–0	—	—	0–1	4–1	—	1–1	3–2	—	—
Guadalajara	0–3	—	—	—	—	1–2	—	—	—	2–2	—	—	—	1–1	2–0	1–1	0–0	2–1
Juárez	—	—	2–1	0–1	—	—	—	1–0	1–6	—	—	—	—	—	0–0	1–0	2–3	1–1
León	—	—	3–1	0–1	1–3	2–0	—	—	—	3–1	0–0	1–2	2–1	—	—	2–1	—	—
Mazatlán	0–1	0–0	0–3	—	1–1	—	4–3	—	—	3–2	1–0	—	3–0	0–0	—	—	—	—
Monterrey	1–0	—	2–0	—	1–2	—	1–1	1–0	—	—	0–1	—	2–1	—	1–1	—	—	1–0
Necaxa	—	1–5	1–0	0–2	—	1–0	—	—	1–1	—	2–2	—	0–0	—	—	—	—	0–1
Pachuca	—	0–1	—	0–1	1–1	1–1	—	—	—	—	—	1–3	—	1–0	2–1	—	1–0	—
Puebla	—	0–1	—	—	1–1	4–0	—	3–1	0–0	1–0	—	—	—	—	0–1	—	1–1	0–0
Querétaro	—	1–0	2–1	—	2–2	1–0	—	—	—	—	3–1	1–1	—	1–0	—	—	0–1	2–0
Santos Laguna	1–1	—	—	1–0	—	3–2	1–2	—	1–0	3–1	—	0–0	—	—	—	3–1	2–0	—
Tijuana	0–2	—	—	—	—	—	2–0	2–3	—	1–0	—	—	3–1	0–1	—	3–2	—	0–0
Toluca	3–1	0–0	—	—	—	—	—	4–1	1–2	2–0	0–2	4–4	3–1	—	—	—	—	1–0
UANL	1–3	—	—	0–2	—	—	2–0	1–2	2–1	1–1	—	—	—	—	3–2	0–1	—	—
UNAM	0–1	0–0	—	0–1	—	—	0–1	3–0	—	—	2–2	—	—	1–0	—	—	0–0	—

Source: Liga MX
Legend: Blue = home team win; Yellow = draw; Red = away team win.
For upcoming matches, an "a" indicates there is an article about the rivalry between the two participants.

=== Individual statistics ===
- First goal of the season:
  (Mexico) Santiago Ormeño for Puebla against Guadalajara (8 January 2021)

==== Top goalscorers ====
Players sorted first by goals scored, then by last name.

Rank	Player	Club	Goals
1	(Argentina) Alexis Canelo	Toluca	11
2	(Argentina) Nicolás Ibáñez	Atlético San Luis	10
3	(Argentina) Rogelio Funes Mori	Monterrey	9
3	(Mexico) Santiago Ormeño	Puebla	9
3	(Uruguay) Jonathan Rodríguez	Cruz Azul	9
6	(Ecuador) Fidel Martínez	Tijuana	8
6	(Ecuador) Ángel Mena	León	8
8	(Mexico) Henry Martín	América	7
9	(Chile) Víctor Dávila	León	6
9	(Ecuador) Michael Estrada	Toluca	6
9	(Uruguay) Nicolás López	UANL	6
9	(Mexico) José Juan Macías	Guadalajara	6
9	(Mexico) Ángel Sepúlveda	Querétaro	6

Source: Liga MX

==== Hat-tricks ====
Player	For	Against	Result	Date
(Argentina) Alexis Canelo	Toluca	Mazatlán	4–1	7 February 2021
(Mexico) Santiago Ormeño	Puebla	Juárez	4–0	12 February 2021

=== Attendance ===
Due to the COVID-19 pandemic in Mexico, the majority of matches in the beginning of the season were played behind closed doors. On 7 January 2021, Liga MX announced states that are green and yellow on the traffic light monitoring system have the authorization to allow fans in attendance at a reduced capacity. Mazatlán announced it would allow up to 7,575 fans in attendance (40% of stadium's capacity). On 12 January 2021, it was announced Necaxa would allow 30% capacity for their Week 2 match against Atlético San Luis. Due to a rise in cases in the state of Aguascalientes, Necaxa did not allow fans in attendance for their Week 5 and 7 matches but later allowed fans in Week 9.

On 1 March 2021, state authorities of Jalisco authorized the opening of Atlas and Guadalajara's stadiums at 30% capacity. On 2 March 2021, Liga MX announced stadiums can be up to 50% capacity; the announcement came after various states' status went to yellow on the traffic light monitoring system. That same day, the state authorities of Chihuahua authorized FC Juárez to have fans in attendance, also at 30% capacity. As the season progressed, León, Pachuca, and Santos Laguna, were authorized to open their stadiums by their local Governments.

	Home match played behind closed doors
	Away match
	Highest attended match
	Lowest attended match
PPD	Match postponed

Team	Week																	Total Att	Avg.	Total Pld
Team	1	2	3	4	5	6	7	8	9	10	11	12	13	14	15	16	17	Total Att	Avg.	Total Pld
América																		0	0	0
Atlas													4,457	5,785		12,740		22,982	7,661	3
Atlético San Luis															5,175		5,448	10,623	5,312	2
Cruz Azul																		0	0	0
Guadalajara											10,141		4,704		4,806		11,076	30,727	7,682	4
Juárez									5,211		5,780		5,911	3,191				20,093	5,023	4
León											4,891		5,090		5,196		4,888	20,065	5,016	4
Mazatlán	7,049			6,527		6,378		7,267		9,543		10,159			8,785	9,337		65,045	8,130	8
Monterrey												10,167			9,279		9,767	29,213	9,737	3
Necaxa		3,726							4,948			4,153		8,099	4,726		6,127	31,779	5,297	6
Pachuca												5,801		5,325		6,533		17,659	5,886	3
Puebla																12,778		12,778	12,778	1
Querétaro																4,373		4,373	4,373	1
Santos Laguna										6,510		8,453			6,374		8,067	29,404	7,351	4
Tijuana																		0	0	0
Toluca																		0	0	0
UANL														5,605		12,225		17,830	8,915	2
UNAM																		0	0	0
Total	7,049	3,726	0	6,527	0	6,378	0	7,267	10,159	16,053	20,812	38,733	20,162	28,005	44,341	57,986	45,373	312,571	6,946	45

Source: Liga MX

==== Highest and lowest ====
Highest attended					Lowest attended			
Week	Home	Score	Away	Attendance	Home	Score	Away	Attendance
1	Mazatlán	3–2	Necaxa	7,049	N/A			
2	Necaxa	1–0	Atlético San Luis	3,726	N/A			
3	No matches with fans in attendance							
4	Mazatlán	1–0	Pachuca	6,527	N/A			
5	No matches with fans in attendance							
6	Mazatlán	0–3	Atlético San Luis	6,378	N/A			
7	No matches with fans in attendance							
8	Mazatlán	3–0	Querétaro	7,267	N/A			
9	Juárez	1–6	Monterrey	5,211	Necaxa	2–2	Pachuca	4,948
10	Mazatlán	1–1	Guadalajara	9,543	Santos Laguna	3–1	Necaxa	6,510
11	Guadalajara	0–3	América	10,141	Juárez	1–1	UNAM	5,780
12	Mazatlán	0–1	América	10,159	Necaxa	1–0	Juárez	4,153
13	Juárez	0–1	Cruz Azul	5,911	Atlas	1–0	Tijuana	4,457
14	Necaxa	0–1	UNAM	8,099	Juárez	2–1	Atlético San Luis	3,191
15	Monterrey	0–1	Pachuca	9,279	Necaxa	0–0	Querétaro	4,726
16	Puebla	0–0	UNAM	12,778	Querétaro	1–0	Juárez	4,373
17	Guadalajara	0–0	UANL	11,076	León	2–1	Querétaro	4,888

Source: Liga MX

1. Does not include matches played behind closed doors.

=== Final phase ===
==== Reclassification ====
Team 1	Score	Team 2
Santos Laguna	5–0	Querétaro
León	2–2 (2–4 p)	Toluca
Atlas	1–0	UANL
Pachuca	4–2	Guadalajara

- All rounds were played in a single game hosted by the higher seed
- If a game ended in a draw, it proceeded directly to a penalty shoot-out.

==== Bracket ====
Quarter-finals
1	Cruz Azul	1	3	4
8	Toluca	2	1	3
2	América	1	4	5
7	Pachuca (a)	3	2	5
3	Puebla (s)	0	1	1
6	Atlas	1	0	1
4	Monterrey	1	1	2
5	Santos Laguna	2	1	3

Semi-finals
1	Cruz Azul	0	1	1
7	Pachuca	0	0	0
3	Puebla	0	1	1
5	Santos Laguna	3	0	3

Finals
1	Cruz Azul	1	1	2
5	Santos Laguna	0	1	1

- Teams were re-seeded each round.
- The winners of the Reclassification matches were seeded based on their ranking in the classification table.
- Team with more goals on aggregate after two matches advanced.
- Away goals rule was applied in the quarter-finals and semi-finals, but not the final.
- In the quarter-finals and semi-finals, if the two teams were tied on aggregate and away goals, the higher seeded team advanced.
- In the final, if the two teams were tied after both legs, the match went to extra time and, if necessary, a shoot-out.
- Both finalists qualified to the 2022 CONCACAF Champions League.

==== Quarterfinals ====
Team 1	Agg.	Team 2	1st leg	2nd leg
Toluca	3–4	Cruz Azul	2–1	1–3
Pachuca	5–5 (a)	América	3–1	2–4
Atlas	1–1 (s)	Puebla	1–0	0–1
Santos Laguna	3–2	Monterrey	2–1	1–1

==== Semifinals ====
Team 1	Agg.	Team 2	1st leg	2nd leg
Pachuca	0–1	Cruz Azul	0–0	0–1
Santos Laguna	3–1	Puebla	3–0	0–1

==== Finals ====
Team 1	Agg.	Team 2	1st leg	2nd leg
Santos Laguna	1–2	Cruz Azul	0–1	1–1

== Coefficient table ==
As of the 2020–21 season, the promotion and relegation between Liga MX and Liga de Expansión MX (formerly known as Ascenso MX) was suspended, however, the coefficient table will be used to establish the payment of fines that will be used for the development of the clubs of the silver circuit.

Per Article 24 of the competition regulations, the payment of $MXN240 million will be distributed among the last three positioned in the coefficient table as follows: 120 million in the last place; 70 million the penultimate; and 50 million will be paid by the sixteenth team in the table.

The team that finishes last on the table will start the following season with a coefficient of zero. Due to the COVID-19 pandemic suspending the Clausura 2020 season, the points obtained in the 2020–21 season between matches not held in the Clausura 2020, will now count as double for the 2020–21 coefficient.

Pos	Team	'18 A Pts	'19 C Pts	'19 A Pts	'20 C Pts	'20 G Pts	'21 G Pts	Total Pts	Total Pld	Avg	GD	Fine
1	América	33	29	31	20 + 14	32	38	197	103	1.9126	+31	Fine avoided
2	Cruz Azul	36	30	23	23 + 12	29	41	194	103	1.8738	+33	Fine avoided
3	León	18	41	33	21 + 8	40	26	187	103	1.8155	+39	Fine avoided
4	UANL	29	37	32	17 + 11	28	23	177	103	1.7184	+25	Fine avoided
5	Santos Laguna	30	22	37	18 + 11	25	26	169	103	1.6408	+24	Fine avoided
6	Monterrey	30	30	27	6 + 8	29	28	158	103	1.5340	+11	Fine avoided
7	UNAM	30	17	23	21 + 13	32	18	154	103	1.4951	+12	Fine avoided
8	Pachuca	24	28	25	14 + 8	25	23	147	103	1.4272	+10	Fine avoided
9	Guadalajara	20	18	25	16 + 9	26	23	137	103	1.3301	+5	Fine avoided
10	Puebla	20	24	17	18 + 7	20	28	134	103	1.3010	–3	Fine avoided
11	Toluca	26	25	17	10 + 7	21	22	128	103	1.2427	–15	Fine avoided
12	Querétaro	26	11	31	14 + 10	13	21	126	103	1.2233	–1	Fine avoided
13	Necaxa	14	29	31	11 + 3	24	11	123	103	1.1942	–8	Fine avoided
14	Mazatlán	25	13	27	14 + 4	16	21	120	103	1.1650	–8	Fine avoided
15	Tijuana	17	18	24	9 + 7	15	20	120	103	1.1650	–33	Fine avoided
16	Juárez (F)	19	20	18	14 + 7	19	15	112	103	1.0874	–27	MX$50M
17	Atlas (F)	11	19	21	10 + 6	14	25	106	103	1.0291	–16	MX$70M
18	Atlético San Luis (F)	Ascenso MX		20	13 + 8	11	12	64	69	0.9275	–45	MX$120M

Rules for fine payment: 1) Fine coefficient; 2) Goal difference; 3) Number of goals scored; 4) Head-to-head results between tied teams; 5) Number of goals scored away; 6) Fair Play points
F = Team will have to pay fine indicated.
Source: Liga MX

1. Includes the points obtained in the 2020–21 season against clubs they did not face in the Clausura 2020.
2. 2018–19 and 2019–20 points were accumulated as Monarcas Morelia.
3. 2018–19 points were accumulated as Lobos BUAP.

== Aggregate table ==
The aggregate table (the sum of points of both the Guardianes 2020 and Guardianes 2021 tournaments) will be used to determine participants in the 2021 Leagues Cup.

Pos	Team	Pld	W	D	L	GF	GA	GD	Pts	Qualification or relegation
1	Cruz Azul (C, X)	34	22	4	8	49	27	+22	70	Champions League (Note: As Guard1anes 2021 champions (MEX2))
2	América	34	21	7	6	57	36	+21	70 (Note: América was penalized for having an ineligible player on the bench in their Guardianes 2021 Week 7 match against Atlas. América originally won the match 0–2 but were docked the 3 points obtained for the victory. Atlas were given a 3–0 victory and the 3 points docked from América.)	
3	León (C, A)	34	20	6	8	52	37	+15	66	Champions League and Leagues Cup (Note: As Guard1anes 2020 champions (MEX1))
4	Monterrey	34	16	9	9	48	34	+14	57	
5	UANL	34	13	12	9	46	36	+10	51	Leagues Cup
6	Santos Laguna	34	14	9	11	42	33	+9	51	Champions League and Leagues Cup (Note: As Guard1anes 2021 runners-up (MEX4))
7	UNAM	34	12	14	8	39	29	+10	50	Champions League and Leagues Cup (Note: As Guard1anes 2020 runners-up (MEX3))
8	Guadalajara	34	12	13	9	41	38	+3	49	
9	Puebla	34	13	9	12	47	39	+8	48	
10	Pachuca	34	12	12	10	38	33	+5	48	
11	Toluca	34	12	7	15	49	52	−3	43	
12	Atlas	34	10	9	15	33	35	−2	39	
13	Mazatlán	34	10	7	17	43	57	−14	37	
14	Tijuana	34	9	8	17	31	48	−17	35	
15	Necaxa	34	9	8	17	30	49	−19	35	
16	Querétaro	34	9	7	18	42	53	−11	34	
17	Juárez	34	8	10	16	29	48	−19	34	
18	Atlético San Luis	34	6	5	23	36	68	−32	23	

Source: Liga MX
Rules for classification: 1) Points; 2) Goal difference; 3) Number of goals scored; 4) Head-to-head results between tied teams; 5) Number of goals scored away; 6) Highest relegation coefficient; 7) Fair Play points
(A) Apertura champion (Guardianes 2020); (C) Champions; (X) Clausura champion (Guardianes 2021)

== See also ==
- 2020 Copa por México
- 2020–21 Liga de Expansión MX season
- 2020–21 Liga MX Femenil season
