= Juan Reynoso (footballer) =

Peruvian footballer and manager (born 1969)

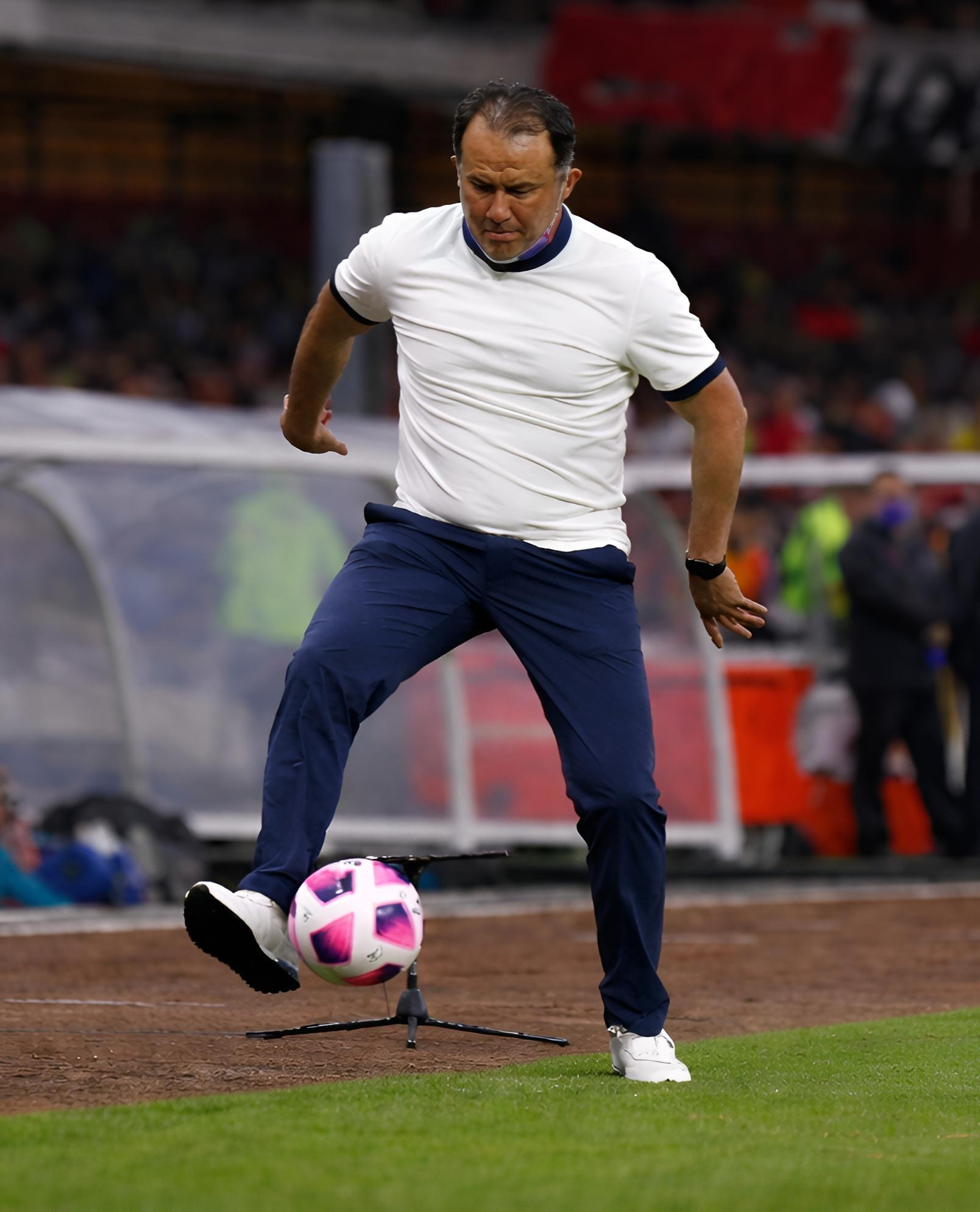
- Reynoso as Cruz Azul manager in 2021

Personal information
- Full name: Juan Máximo Reynoso Guzmán
- Date of birth: 28 December 1969 (age 56)
- Place of birth: Lima, Peru
- Height: 1.81 m (5 ft 11 in)
- Position: Defender

Team information
- Current team: Necaxa (Manager)

Senior career*
Years	Team	Apps	(Gls)
1986–1990	Alianza Lima		
1990–1991	Sabadell	14	(0)
1991–1992	Alianza Lima		
1993–1994	Universitario		
1994–2002	Cruz Azul	236	(12)
2002–2004	Necaxa	75	(2)

International career
1986–2000	Peru	84	(5)

Managerial career
- 2004–2006: Necaxa (assistant)
- 2007–2008: Coronel Bolognesi
- 2009–2010: Universitario
- 2010: Juan Aurich
- 2011: Sporting Cristal
- 2012: Cruz Azul (assistant)
- 2013–2014: Cruz Azul Hidalgo
- 2014–2017: Melgar
- 2017–2019: Puebla (assistant)
- 2019: Real Garcilaso
- 2019–2020: Puebla
- 2021–2022: Cruz Azul
- 2022–2023: Peru
- 2025–2026: Melgar
- 2026–: Necaxa
- * Club domestic league appearances and goals

Juan Máximo Reynoso Guzmán (born 28 December 1969) is a Peruvian manager and former footballer who played as a defender and is currently the manager of Liga MX club Necaxa.

He started his playing career in his native Peru where he played for Alianza Lima from 1986 to 1990. He made over 230 appearances with Cruz Azul where he served as captain and let the team to a historic treble in the 1996–97 season. He later joined Necaxa and retired in 2004 after making playing over 75 games.

At international level Reynoso capped for the Peru, with 84 appearances from 1986 to 2000, serving as captain from 1993 to 1999. He represented the team at five Copa America tournaments in 1987, 1989, 1993, 1995 and 1999. He also captained the team to reach the semi-finals of 2000 CONCACAF Gold Cup his final tournament.

== Club career ==
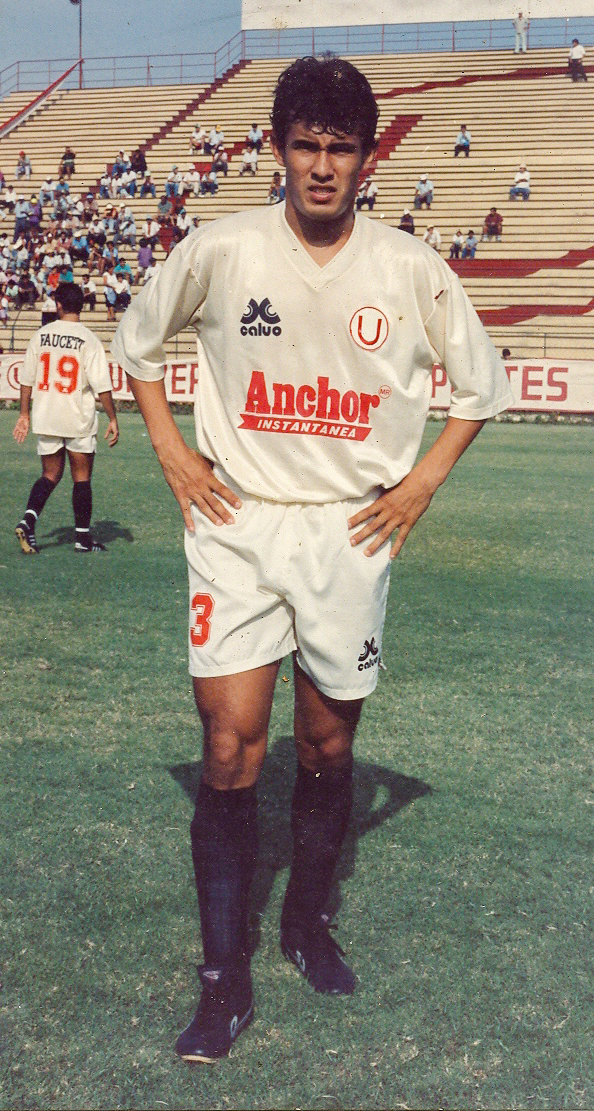
Reynoso playing for Universitario in 1993

Born in Lima, Reynoso started his career playing for Alianza Lima from 1986 to 1990. He later joined Spanish club Sabadell in 1990, with the club featuring in the Segunda División at the time.

In his only season with the Barcelona-based club, he played 14 league matches and returned to Alianza Lima the following year. He stayed with Alianza Lima until 1992 before signing for fellow Peruvian club Universitario in January 1993. In his first season with the club he won his first career title as the club won the Peruvian Primera División in the 1993 season.

In July 1994, he moved to Mexico and joined Liga MX Cruz Azul where he would end up playing for eight years from 1994 to 2002. He won the CONCACAF Champions' Cup in 1996 with the club.

During the 1996–97 season he was a key member of the Cruz Azul side that won 1996–97 Copa México after they won by a 2–0 victory over Toros Neza in the final.

In 1997, he captained the club to the Primera División de México Invierno 1997 title ending a 17-year championship drought. Alongside that he led them to retain their CONCACAF Champions' Cup for the 1997 season after Los Angeles Galaxy 5–2 in the final, completing a continental treble, the second time in the club's in history. He joined Mexican club Necaxa in 2002. In 2004, he announced his retirement from playing football after almost 20 years of playing.

== International career ==
Reynoso obtained 84 international caps for his national team, in which he scored five goals. He made his debut on 28 January 1986, against PR China (1-3), when he was aged sixteen (and 31 days). Reynoso played his last international match for his native country on 23 February 2000, against Colombia (1–2). He served as captain of the side from 1993 to 1999. He featured in five Copa America tournaments namely 1987, 1989, 1993, 1995 and 1999.

He also captained the team to reach the semi-finals of 2000 CONCACAF Gold Cup his final tournament.

== Managerial career ==
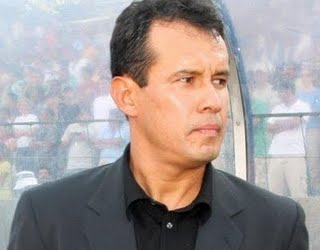
Reynoso in 2009

Reynoso started his coaching career immediately after retiring at Club Necaxa in 2004 and was appointed as the assistant coach of the club serving under Raúl Arias. He played that role until 2006.

=== Bolognesi ===
In 2007, he returned to his native Peru and was appointed as the head coach of Coronel Bolognesi. He led the club to their first league title in the history of the club (78 years) by winning the 2007 Torneo Clausura.

In 2012, he returned to his former Cruz Azul to serve as the assistant coach to Enrique Meza, the coach who signed him for the club in 1994. He moved on to serve as the head coach of Cruz Azul Hidalgo from 2013 to 2014.

=== Melgar ===
Reynoso moved back to his native Peru and signed for Melgar in January 2014. In 2015, he led the club to the 2015 Torneo Clausura and ultimately the 2015 Peruvian Primera División to end their 34-year championship drought. in 2017, he also led the team to the 2017 Torneo de Verano beating UTC via a penalty shootout in the finals after a 2–2 aggregate in the double legged final. This resulted in him winning his third league title at the end of his three-year tenure.

=== Puebla ===
After his exploits with Melgar, he moved back to Mexico in October 2019 to serve as the assistant coach to Enrique Meza, this time at Liga MX club Puebla. After spending two years with as assistant at Puebla, in March 2019, he returned to Peru to serve the head coach of Real Garcilaso, now Cusco FC.

After five months, he returned to Puebla as he had been appointed as their new head coach in August 2019. During the 2020 Liga MX Apertura, he led the club to eliminate reigning champions Monterrey in a penalty shootout to qualify to the quarter-finals. During the quarter-finals, they defeated eventual winners Leon by 2–1 in the first leg, however they were beaten 2–0 by Leon in the second leg of the quarterfinals and were eliminated by 3–2 on aggregate. Following the club's quarterfinal exit from the tournament, he was sacked in December 2020. During his tenure he guided Puebla to 14 wins, eight draws and 19 losses. He was later replaced by Nicolás Larcamón.

=== Cruz Azul ===
In January 2021, Reynoso was appointed the head coach of his former club Cruz Azul, replacing Luis Armando González who was working in a caretaker role. He won his four out of his first six matches in charge picking up the 12 points, the highest in a Cruz Azul's manager's debut in the last six years.

On 31 May 2021, he led Cruz Azul in making history by winning the Liga MX when Cruz Azul beat Santos Laguna 2–1 on aggregate in the final to claim the Guardianes 2021 season title. It was the club's ninth in all, but the first in 24 years, ending a title drought for the Los Azules since 1997 when he captained them to win the trophy. With the win he also became the club's first foreign-born manager to win the title. He also became the first to win a league title as both a player and a coach for Cruz Azul in the club's history.

On 18 July 2021, Reynoso led Cruz Azul to the 2021 Campeón de Campeones beating León by 2–1 at Dignity Health Sports Park in Carson, California. The match was between Liga MX season's Apertura and Clausura champions with León being the Apertura Champion.

On 18 May 2022, Reynoso was dismissed by Cruz Azul.

=== Peru ===
On 3 August 2022, Reynoso was presented as the new head coach of Peru's national football team, after the successful management of Ricardo Gareca. He left Mexico, and his 1st match would be against Mexico with a 1–0 loss. He would pick up his 1st win with Peru on 27 September 2022, in a 4–1 win against El Salvador. He would then win against Paraguay and Bolivia, both 1-0 just before the Qatar 2022 World Cup.

After failing to gain a win after 6 matches in 2026 FIFA World Cup qualification (CONMEBOL), Peru were sitting on 2 points. Reports had come in that Peru were searching for a new head coach. On 23 November 2023, Juan Carlos Oblitas would officially state that Reynoso wouldn't resume being the manager of Peru. On 13 December 2023, the Peruvian Football Federation published a statement, confirming Reynoso's departure.

=== Melgar return ===
On 5 August 2025, after more than a year without a club, Reynoso was announced as manager of Melgar. The following 21 March, he left the club by mutual consent.

== Career statistics ==
=== International ===
National team	Year	Apps	Goals
Peru	1986	3	0
Peru	1987	3	0
Peru	1988	4	0
Peru	1989	16	2
Peru	1990	0	0
Peru	1991	0	0
Peru	1992	1	0
Peru	1993	19	1
Peru	1994	3	0
Peru	1995	1	0
Peru	1996	9	2
Peru	1997	11	0
Peru	1998	2	0
Peru	1999	8	0
Peru	2000	4	0
Total		84	5

=== International goals ===
Scores and results list Peru's goal tally first.

No	Date	Venue	Opponent	Score	Result	Competition
1.	1 July 1989	Estádio Fonte Nova, Salvador	Paraguay	2–4	2–5	1989 Copa América
2.	25 July 1989	Estadio Nacional, Santiago	Chile	1–2	1–2	Friendly
3.	27 June 1993	Estadio Olímpico Atahualpa, Quito	Mexico	2–4	2–4	1993 Copa América
4.	2 June 1996	Estadio Nacional, Lima	Colombia	1–1	1–1	1998 FIFA World Cup qualification
5.	10 November 1996	Estadio Nacional, Lima	Venezuela	1–0	4–1	1998 FIFA World Cup qualification

== Managerial statistics ==
As of match played 6 November 2026

Managerial record by team and tenure
Team	Nat	From	To	Record				
Team	Nat	From	To	P	W	D	L	Win %
Coronel Bolognesi	(Peru)	1 April 2007	23 November 2008	49	14	16	19	28.57
Universitario	(Peru)	23 December 2008	1 July 2010	80	39	22	19	48.75
Juan Aurich	(Peru)	18 August 2010	30 December 2010	16	7	3	6	43.75
Sporting Cristal	(Peru)	20 April 2011	23 November 2011	18	7	7	4	38.89
Cruz Azul Hidalgo	(Mexico)	1 January 2013	31 December 2013	40	9	15	16	22.50
Melgar	(Peru)	8 January 2014	1 October 2017	190	86	52	52	45.26
Real Garcilaso	(Peru)	25 March 2019	20 August 2019	18	9	5	4	50.00
Puebla	(Mexico)	26 August 2019	5 December 2020	46	15	10	21	32.61
Cruz Azul	(Mexico)	2 January 2021	18 May 2022	74	36	20	18	48.65
Peru	(Peru)	3 August 2022	22 November 2023	14	4	3	7	28.57
Melgar	(Peru)	5 August 2025	21 March 2026	21	8	8	5	38.10
Necaxa	(Mexico)	14 September 2026	Present	8	1	2	5	12.50
Total				574	235	163	176	40.94

== Honours ==
=== Player ===
Universitario de Deportes

- Peruvian Primera División: 1993

Cruz Azul

- Primera División de México: Invierno 1997
- Copa Mexico: 1996–97
- CONCACAF Champions' Cup: 1996, 1997
- Copa Libertadores runner-up: 2001

=== Manager ===
Bolognesi

- Torneo Clausura: 2007

Universitario de Deportes

- Peruvian Primera División: 2009

FBC Melgar

- Torneo Clausura: 2015
- Peruvian Primera División: 2015
- Torneo de Verano: 2017

Cruz Azul

- Liga MX: Guardianes 2021
- Campeón de Campeones: 2021

Individual

- Liga MX Best Manager: 2020–21
- Liga MX All-Star: 2021
