= Ildefonso Mendoza =

Mexican footballer and manager (born 1975)

Personal information
- Full name: Ildefonso Mendoza Segovia
- Date of birth: 21 September 1975 (age 51)
- Place of birth: San Luis Potosí City, San Luis Potosí
- Height: 1.80 m (5 ft 11 in)
- Position: Goalkeeper

Team information
- Current team: Atlético San Luis U-17 (Assistant)

Senior career*
Years	Team	Apps	(Gls)
1994–1995	Tampico Madero	3	(0)

Managerial career
- 2009: Necaxa (Goalkeeper coach)
- 2013–2017: Tijuana Reserves and Academy
- 2017: Dorados de Sinaloa (Assistant)
- 2018–2019: Tijuana Reserves and Academy
- 2020: Querétaro Reserves and Academy
- 2020: Dorados de Sinaloa (Assistant)
- 2021–2023: Tijuana Reserves and Academy
- 2021: Tijuana (Interim)
- 2023–: Atlético San Luis Reserves and Academy
- * Club domestic league appearances and goals

Ildefonso Mendoza Segovia (born September 21, 1975) is a Mexican football manager and former player. He was born in Mexico City.
