= Andrés Lillini =

Argentine footballer

Personal information
- Full name: Andrés Luciano Lillini
- Date of birth: 13 August 1974 (age 52)
- Place of birth: Santa Fe, Argentina
- Height: 1.73 m (5 ft 8 in)

Senior career*
Years	Team	Apps	(Gls)
?–1999	Newell's Old Boys		

Managerial career
- 2015: San Luis de Quillota (assistant)
- 2016: Gimnasia Jujuy (assistant)
- 2020: UNAM (interim)
- 2020–2022: UNAM
- 2023: Necaxa
- * Club domestic league appearances and goals

Andrés Luciano Lilini (born 13 August 1974) is an Argentine football manager and former player.

== Career ==
=== Early career ===
Lillini had a brief career as a footballer, which ended at the age of 25 after playing in Newell's Old Boys.

After retiring as a footballer, he began a career in the footballer development structures of various soccer clubs around the world. Between 2001 and 2006 he served as director of youth development at Mexico's Monarcas Morelia. Later, in 2007, Lillini began working at Boca Juniors, where he remained until 2011. Between 2011 and 2014 he continued his career in Europe with CSKA Moscow.

In 2015, Lillini began working as a technical assistant in the Chilean team San Luis de Quillota, accompanying Mario Sciacqua. The following year he continued on Sciacqua's coaching staff, but this time working for Gimnasia y Esgrima de Jujuy.

=== Universidad Nacional ===
On 24 November 2017, Lillini returned to Mexico and was appointed director of the academy and reserve teams of the Pumas UNAM.

Due to his knowledge of the club's academy, Lillini was appointed as interim manager of the UNAM first team on 23 July 2020, replacing Míchel, who resigned the day before. Due to the good results shown and the youth soccer development policy, on 17 August, he was ratified as manager for the rest of the Torneo Guardianes 2020. On 13 December 2020 Lillini achieved the runner-up for UNAM, the team was defeated in the final by Club León, however, due to this result, Lillini managed to continue as manager for the Guardianes 2021.

After getting the Liga MX runner-up in the Apertura 2020, Lillini qualified UNAM for the 2022 CONCACAF Champions League, in the international tournament Mexico's team reached the final after eliminating the clubs Saprissa, New England Revolution and Cruz Azul. However, in the last series UNAM was defeated by the American team Seattle Sounders FC with an aggregate score of 5–2, being the first time in 17 years that Mexico was not champion of the most important club competition in CONCACAF.

Lillini remained at UNAM until October 2022 when he was fired for having poor results in the Apertura 2022 tournament.

=== Necaxa ===
A month after leaving UNAM, Lillini was appointed as the manager of Club Necaxa, another team participating in the Liga MX. Lillini only stayed one tournament with Necaxa because in May 2023 he left the team by mutual agreement. During his stay at that club, Lillini led 17 games in which he only won three.

=== Mexico national team ===
On 31 May 2023, Lillini was appointed as director of the youth teams of the Mexico national team, a management position that is in charge of coordinating all the representative youth teams of Mexico.

== Managerial statistics ==
As of 30 April 2023.

Team	From	To	Record				
Team	From	To	G	W	D	L	Win %
UNAM	23 July 2020	4 October 2022	107	34	39	34	31.78
Necaxa	1 January 2023	2 May 2023	17	3	5	9	17.65
Total			124	37	44	43	29.84
