= Armando González (footballer, born 1968) =

Mexican footballer and manager (born 1968)

Personal information
- Full name: Luis Armando González Bejarano
- Date of birth: 16 November 1968 (age 57)
- Place of birth: Aguascalientes, Aguascalientes, Mexico
- Height: 1.74 m (5 ft 9 in)
- Position: Forward

Senior career*
Years	Team	Apps	(Gls)
1989–1995	Guadalajara		
1995	Tecos		
1996–1997	Toluca	20	(2)
1997–1998	Veracruz	22	(5)
1999–2002	Celaya	30	(16)
2002	Querétaro	19	(1)
2003	Celaya	7	(0)

Managerial career
- 2009–2010: Necaxa (assistant)
- 2013: Necaxa (assistant)
- 2014: Necaxa
- 2017: UAT (assistant)
- 2020–2021: Cruz Azul Reserves and Academy
- 2020: Cruz Azul (interim)
- 2023: Mazatlán (assistant)
- * Club domestic league appearances and goals

Luis Armando González Bejarano (born November 16, 1968) is a Mexican football manager and former player.

== Personal life ==
González is the father of Guadalajara player Armando "La Hormiga" González Alba.
