= Jonathan Rodríguez (footballer, born 1993) =

Uruguayan footballer

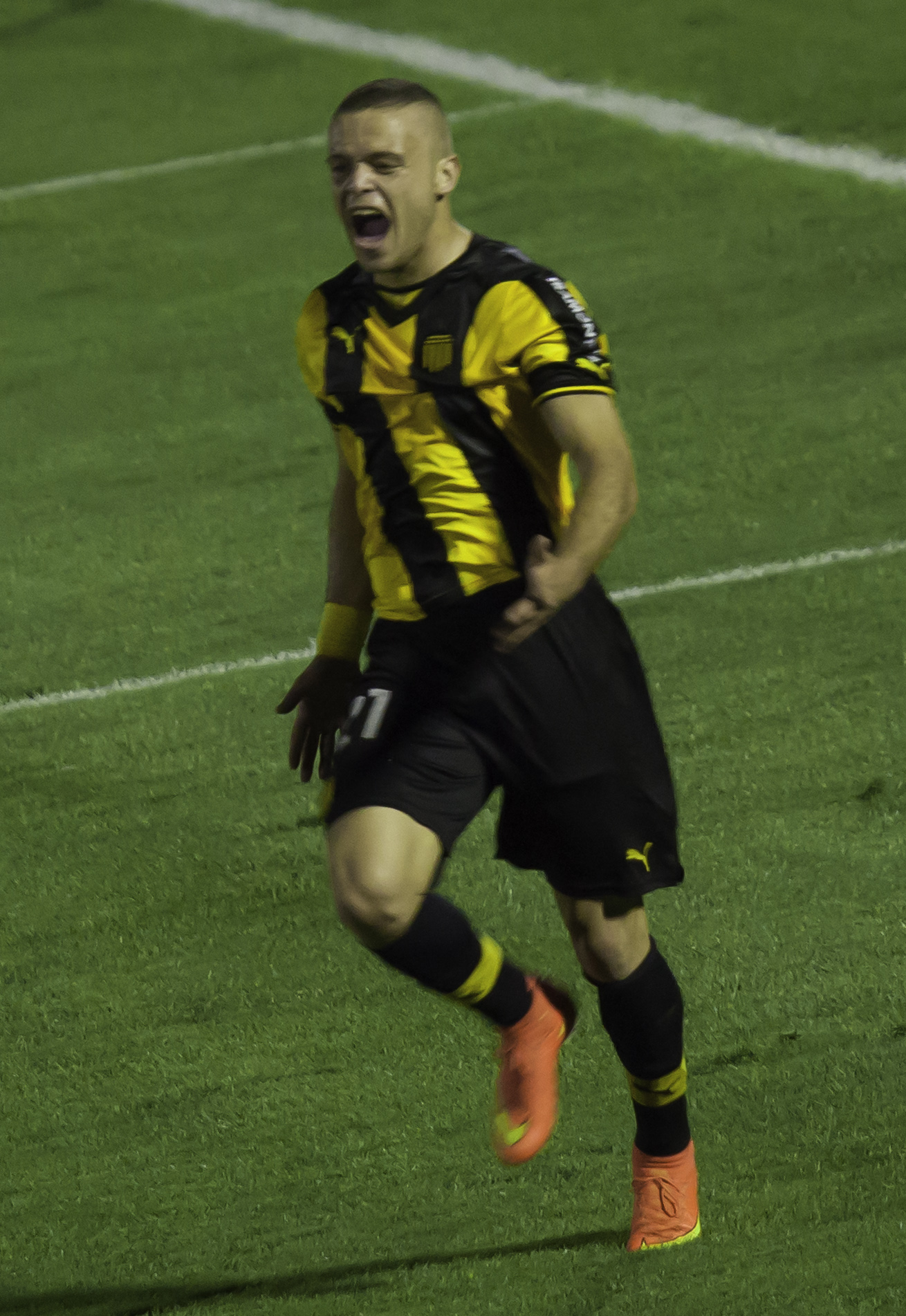
- Rodríguez with Peñarol in 2014

Personal information
- Full name: Jonathan Javier Rodríguez Portillo
- Date of birth: 6 July 1993 (age 33)
- Place of birth: Florida, Uruguay
- Height: 1.78 m (5 ft 10 in)
- Positions: Forward; winger

Team information
- Current team: Peñarol
- Number: 24

Youth career
- Atlético Florida
- Peñarol

Senior career*
| Years | Team | Apps | (Gls) |
| 2013–2015 | Peñarol | 38 | (16) |
| 2015 | → Benfica (loan) | 1 | (0) |
| 2015 | → Benfica B (loan) | 6 | (7) |
| 2015–2016 | Benfica | 0 | (0) |
| 2015–2016 | → Deportivo La Coruña (loan) | 13 | (0) |
| 2016–2018 | Santos Laguna | 87 | (29) |
| 2019–2021 | Cruz Azul | 95 | (44) |
| 2022 | Al-Nassr | 8 | (1) |
| 2022–2024 | América | 61 | (20) |
| 2024–2026 | Portland Timbers | 35 | (17) |
| 2026- | Peñarol | 0 | (0) |

International career
| 2014–2023 | Uruguay | 31 | (3) |
- * Club domestic league appearances and goals as of 24 July 2026

Jonathan Javier Rodríguez Portillo (born 6 July 1993) is a Uruguayan professional footballer who plays as a forward or winger for Peñarol in the Uruguayan Primera División.

== Club career ==
=== Peñarol ===
Born in Florida, Uruguay, Rodríguez began his career with local club Peñarol in Uruguayan Primera División. In his first season, he scored 0 goals in 27 matches. He also made appearances for the club in Copa Libertadores.

=== Benfica ===
On 29 January 2015, Rodríguez joined Portuguese champions S.L. Benfica on a loan deal until 30 June 2017. Penãrol's president, Juan Pedro Damiani, said that Benfica paid €2 million for 40% of Rodríguez's economic rights, with the remaining 60% totalling €4.4 million. Rodríguez joined Benfica along with countryman Elbio Álvarez, a former Peñarol player.

On 22 February 2015, Rodríguez debuted for Benfica B and scored twice in a home win against Oriental (3–0) in Segunda Liga. On 18 March, he scored a hat-trick in a home win against Portimonense (4–1). On 11 April 2015, Rodríguez debuted for the first-team, as a substitute, in a home win against Académica (5–1) in Primeira Liga.

On 20 August 2015, Rodríguez was loaned out to Deportivo de La Coruña for one season. He made 13 league appearances throughout the duration of the loan, the first of which was a stint off the bench replacing Juanfran in a 1-1 draw with Valencia.

=== Santos Laguna ===
On 10 June 2016, he signed for Mexican club Santos Laguna on a permanent deal. Rodríguez made his competitive debut for the club on 18 July 2016, playing the entirety of a 1-1 draw with Tigres. He scored his first goal for the club a week and a half later, converting a penalty in the 19th minute of a 1-1 draw with FC Juárez in the Copa MX. The 2017–18 season was Rodríguez's most prolific with the club, as he scored 16 goals across all competitions.

=== Cruz Azul ===
On 19 December 2018, Rodríguez completed a permanent move to Cruz Azul.

=== Al-Nassr ===
On 11 January 2022, Rodríguez joined Saudi Arabia club Al-Nassr.

=== América ===
On 20 June 2022, Rodríguez returned to Mexico and joined Club América on a permanent transfer.

=== Portland Timbers ===
On 20 March 2024, Rodríguez signed with Major League Soccer side Portland Timbers on a deal keeping him at the club until at least 2026. On 10 February 2026, Rodríguez was waived by Portland.

== International career ==
Rodríguez scored his first international goal for Uruguay in a 3–0 victory over Oman on 13 October 2014.

== Career statistics ==
=== International ===
As of match played 16 November 2021

Uruguay
| Year | Apps | Goals |
| 2014 | 4 | 1 |
| 2015 | 5 | 0 |
| 2016 | 0 | 0 |
| 2017 | 0 | 0 |
| 2018 | 3 | 1 |
| 2019 | 8 | 1 |
| 2020 | 4 | 0 |
| 2021 | 5 | 0 |
| Total | 29 | 3 |

Scores and results list Uruguay's goal tally first.

| No. | Date | Venue | Opponent | Score | Result | Competition |
|---|---|---|---|---|---|---|
| 1. | 13 October 2014 | Sultan Qaboos Sports Complex, Muscat, Oman | Oman | 3–0 | 3–0 | Friendly |
| 2. | 16 October 2018 | Saitama Stadium 2002, Saitama, Japan | Japan | 3–4 | 3–4 | 2018 Kirin Challenge Cup |
| 3. | 6 September 2019 | Estadio Nacional de Costa Rica, San José, Costa Rica | Costa Rica | 2–1 | 2–1 | Friendly |

== Honours ==
Benfica

- Primeira Liga: 2014–15

Santos Laguna

- Liga MX: Clausura 2018

Cruz Azul

- Liga MX: Guardianes 2021
- Campeón de Campeones: 2021
- Supercopa MX: 2019
- Leagues Cup: 2019

América

- Liga MX: Apertura 2023, Clausura 2024
- Campeón de Campeones: 2024

Individual

- Liga MX Balón de Oro: 2020–21
- Liga MX Best Forward: 2020–21
- Liga MX Golden Boot: Guardianes 2020
- Liga MX Best XI: Guardianes 2020, Guardianes 2021
- Liga MX Player of the Month: September 2020, February 2020, March 2021, April 2021
- Liga MX All-Star: 2021
