= Canel's =

Mexican confectionery company

Canel's, S.A. de C.V.
- Type: Private
- Industry: Confectionery
- Founded: 1925; 101 years ago
- Headquarters: San Luis Potosi, Mexico
- Products: Chewing gum, Lollipops, Hard Candy, Soft Candy, Toffees, Milk Candy, Jelly Beans
- Brands: Canel's, La Vaquita, Piñatero, Tueni, Whatta Bubble
- Website: www.canels.com

Canel's is a Mexican confectionery company founded in 1925 in San Luis Potosí, Mexico. The company's main product line is chewing gum, but it also manufactures soft and hard candies, gummies, cremes, fresh breath products, fruit chews, milk caramel chews, toffees, lollipops, jelly beans, and more.

The company sponsors a professional cycling team called Canel's–Zerouno and is also a regional sponsor for Renault Sport Formula One Team. It also sponsors Liga MX side Atlético San Luis.
