= 2022–23 Cruz Azul season =

Cruz Azul
2022–23 season
- Sporting director: Jaime Ordiales (until 16 August); Carlos López (interim, from 16 August, until 17 February); Óscar Pérez (from 23 February)
- Manager: Diego Aguirre (until 21 August); Raúl Gutiérrez (interim, from 22 August, ratified on 6 December, until 13 February); Joaquín Moreno (interim, from 14 February, until 22 February); Ricardo Ferretti (from 23 February)
- Stadium: Estadio Azteca
- Liga MX: Apertura: 7th (Quarter-finals); Clausura: 8th (Reclassification)
- Supercopa de la Liga MX: Winners
- Top goalscorer: League: Uriel Antuna (8); All: Uriel Antuna (8)
- Highest home attendance: 66,634 vs América (15 April 2023)
- Lowest home attendance: 10,255 vs León (15 September 2022)
- Average home league attendance: 20,229
- Biggest win: Cruz Azul 2–0 Mazatlán; Puebla 1–3 Cruz Azul; Pachuca 0–2 Cruz Azul
- Biggest defeat: América 7–0 Cruz Azul
Home colours	Away colours	Third colours

The 2022–23 Club de Futbol Cruz Azul season was the 96th season in the football club's history and the 58th consecutive season in the top flight of Mexican football. Cruz Azul competed in Liga MX and the Supercopa de la Liga MX.

== Season overview ==
=== May ===
On 19 May, Cruz Azul announced the dismissal of Juan Reynoso as the first team coach, ending his spell at the club after 16 months.

On 31 May, Cruz Azul announced the appointment of Diego Aguirre as the new first team head coach until 2023.

=== August ===
On 5 August, Cruz Azul announced the signing of Ramiro Funes Mori from Al-Nassr.

On 7 August, Rafael Baca's contract was automatically renewed until the end of 2023 after reaching an undisclosed percentage of minutes played.

=== February ===
On 4 February, Carlos Vargas made his debut with Cruz Azul and suffered a season-ending torn ACL in his right knee in the 14th minute of play.

Cruz Azul began the Clausura tournament with a five-game winless streak and four consecutive losses. On 13 February, Cruz Azul announced the dismissal of Raúl Gutiérrez. The under-20 head coach Joaquín Moreno took over training as interim head coach on 14 February with under-18 head coach Joel Huiqui as his assistant. Cruz Azul won their first game of the tournament in week 7, at Puebla, with a score of 3–1.

On 22 February, Cruz Azul announced the hiring of Ricardo Ferretti who signed a contract contingent on his results. Former Cruz Azul managers Guillermo Vázquez and Joaquín Moreno would join Ferretti's coaching staff as assistant coaches.

=== March ===
On 2 March, Carlos Rodríguez and Uriel Antuna were called up to the Mexico national football team for their CONCACAF Nations League group stage matches.

On 3 March, Ignacio Rivero played his 100th match with Cruz Azul. The result was a 3–1 loss to Mazatlán, cutting Cruz Azul's three game win streak short and giving Mazatlán their first win of the season.

== First-team coaching staff ==
Position	Name	Nationality	Year appointed	Last club/team	References
Manager	Ricardo Ferretti	Brazil	2023	(Mexico) FC Juárez (as manager)	
Assistant Coaches	Guillermo Vázquez	Mexico	2023	(Mexico) Necaxa (as manager)	
Assistant Coaches	Joaquín Moreno	Mexico	2023	(Mexico) Cruz Azul (as interim manager)	
Medic	Juan José Pérez	Mexico	2021	(Mexico) Veracruz	
Medic	Ernesto Prado	Mexico	2015	(Mexico) Cruz Azul Hidalgo	
Fitness trainer	Guillermo Orta	Mexico	2023	(Mexico) FC Juárez	
Kinesiologist	Juan Rubio	Mexico	2009		

== Players ==
=== Squad information ===
No.	Pos.	Nat.	Name	Age	Signed in	Previous club
1	GK	(Mexico)	José de Jesús Corona (captain)	42	2009	(Mexico) Tecos UAG
3	DF	(Mexico)	Jaiber Jiménez	28	2019	Youth system
4	DF	(Mexico)	Julio César Domínguez (vice-captain)	35	2006	Youth system
6	MF	(Mexico)	Erik Lira	27	2022 (Winter)	(Mexico) Pumas UNAM
7	MF	(Mexico)	Uriel Antuna	25	2022 (Winter)	(Mexico) Guadalajara
8	FW	(Uruguay)	Gonzalo Carneiro	27	2022	(Uruguay) Liverpool Montevideo
11	FW	(Uruguay)	Christian Tabó	29	2018	(Mexico) Puebla
12	DF	(Mexico)	José Joaquín Martínez	36	2020	(Mexico) Monarcas Morelia
13	FW	(Ecuador)	Michael Estrada	27	2022	(United States) D.C. United
14	MF	(Mexico)	Alexis Gutiérrez	23	2023 (Winter)	(Mexico) Tapatío
15	MF	(Uruguay)	Ignacio Rivero (3rd captain)	31	2020	(Mexico) Tijuana
17	MF	(Mexico)	Alonso Escoboza	30	2022	(Mexico) Necaxa
18	MF	(Mexico)	Rodrigo Huescas	19	2021	Youth system
19	MF	(Mexico)	Carlos Rodríguez	26	2022 (Winter)	(Mexico) Monterrey
20	FW	(Chile)	Iván Morales	23	2022 (Winter)	(Chile) Colo-Colo
21	FW	(Argentina)	Augusto Lotti	26	2023 (Winter)	(Argentina) Atlético Tucumán
22	MF	(Mexico)	Rafael Baca	33	2014 (Winter)	(United States) San Jose Earthquakes
23	MF	(Argentina)	Ramiro Carrera	29	2023 (Winter)	(Argentina) Atlético Tucumán
24	DF	(Paraguay)	Juan Escobar	27	2019	(Paraguay) Cerro Porteño
25	DF	(Argentina)	Ramiro Funes Mori	32	2022	(Saudi Arabia) Al-Nassr
26	DF	(Mexico)	Carlos Vargas	22	2023 (Winter)	(Mexico) Mazatlán
28	DF	(Mexico)	Jordan Silva	22	2023 (Winter)	(Mexico) Querétaro
29	FW	(Argentina)	Carlos Rotondi	26	2022	(Argentina) Defensa y Justicia
30	GK	(Mexico)	Andrés Gudiño	26	2019	(Mexico) Tepatitlán
33	GK	(Mexico)	Sebastián Jurado	25	2020 (Winter)	(Mexico) Veracruz

- Last updated: 8 January 2023
- Source: ligamx.net and cfcruzazul.com

== Transfers ==
=== Transfers in ===
Summer

Date	Position	No.	Player	From	Type	Ref.
2 June 2022	GK	30	(Mexico) Andrés Gudiño	(Mexico) Tepatitlán	Loan return	
4 July 2022	FW	29	(Argentina) Carlos Rotondi	(Argentina) Defensa y Justicia	Transfer	
19 July 2022	FW	8	(Uruguay) Gonzalo Carneiro	(Uruguay) Liverpool Montevideo	Loan	
31 July 2022	MF	–	(Uruguay) Pablo Ceppelini	(Uruguay) Peñarol	Loan return	
5 August 2022	DF	25	(Argentina) Ramiro Funes Mori	(Saudi Arabia) Al–Nassr	Transfer	
13 August 2022	MF	17	(Mexico) Alonso Escoboza	(Mexico) Necaxa	Transfer	
16 August 2022	FW	13	(Ecuador) Michael Estrada	(Mexico) Toluca	Loan	

Winter

Date	Position	No.	Player	From	Type	Ref.
9 November 2022	MF	14	(Mexico) Alexis Gutiérrez	(Mexico) Tapatío	Loan return	
9 November 2022	DF	–	(Mexico) Eduardo Pastrana	(Mexico) Tepatitlán	Loan return	
9 November 2022	MF	23	(Argentina) Ramiro Carrera	(Argentina) Atlético Tucumán	Transfer (Note: Reportedly US$ 1.3 million for 50% of the player rights.)	
9 November 2022	FW	21	(Argentina) Augusto Lotti	(Argentina) Atlético Tucumán	Transfer (Note: Reportedly US$ 1.6 million.)	
11 December 2022	DF	28	(Mexico) Jordan Silva	(Mexico) Querétaro	Transfer	
18 January 2023	DF	26	(Mexico) Carlos Vargas	(Mexico) Mazatlán	Transfer	

=== Transfers out ===
Date	Position	No.	Player	To	Type	Ref.
6 June 2022	DF	16	(Mexico) Adrián Aldrete	(Mexico) Pumas UNAM	Transfer	
6 June 2022	MF	8	(Mexico) Luis Ángel Mendoza	Free agent	Released	
7 June 2022	MF	10	(Venezuela) Rómulo Otero	(Brazil) Fortaleza	Released	
8 June 2022	DF	23	(Paraguay) Pablo Aguilar	(Paraguay) Libertad	Released	
29 July 2022	FW	9	(Mexico) Santiago Giménez	(Netherlands) Feyenoord	Transfer	
8 August 2022	MF	–	(Uruguay) Pablo Ceppelini	Free agent	Released	

Date	Position	No.	Player	To	Type	Ref.
20 November 2022	DF	2	(Mexico) Alejandro Mayorga	(Mexico) Guadalajara	Loan return	
28 November 2022	FW	10	(Paraguay) Ángel Romero	(Brazil) Corinthians	Released	
23 December 2022	DF	5	(Peru) Luis Abram	(Spain) Granada	Loan return	

== Pre-season and friendlies ==
=== Matches ===
Win Draw Loss Fixtures

12 June 2022 Friendly	Venados (Mexico)	2–1	(Mexico) Cruz Azul	Mérida
		Report		Stadium: Carlos Iturralde

18 June 2022 Friendly	Cruz Azul (Mexico)	1–1	(Mexico) Atlante	Xochimilco
		Report		Stadium: La Noria

23 November 2022 Friendly	Cancún (Mexico)	0–2	(Mexico) Cruz Azul	Cancún
20:00 UTC−5		Report	Escoboza 5'; Tabó 70' (pen.)	Stadium: Andrés Quintana Roo

25 November 2022 Friendly	Inter Playa del Carmen (Mexico)	0–4	(Mexico) Cruz Azul	Cancún
10:00 UTC−5		Report	Gutiérrez; Tabó; Carrera; Lotti	Attendance: 0 (Note: Match played at hotel grounds behind closed doors.)

27 January 2023 Friendly	Cruz Azul (Mexico)	2–2	(Mexico) Atlante	Xochimilco
	Morales		Angulo	Stadium: La Noria

8 February 2023 Friendly	Cruz Azul (Mexico)	3–3	(United States) Atlanta United	Mexico City
10:00 CDT	Rivero 44'; Cobb 49' (o.g.); Silva 78'	Report	Almada 20'; Araújo 51', 56'	Stadium: Azteca

==== Copa SKY ====
The second edition of the Copa por México will be held with ten Liga MX teams and will serve as a pre-season for the Clausura 2022 tournament.

===== Group stage =====
Pos	Team	Pld	W	D	L	GF	GA	GD	Pts	Qualification
1	Cruz Azul	4	2	2	0	5	3	+2	8	Advance to Final
2	Pumas UNAM	4	1	2	1	4	3	+1	5	
3	Toluca	4	1	2	1	3	4	−1	5	
4	América	4	1	1	2	6	7	−1	4	
5	Necaxa	4	0	3	1	3	4	−1	3	

12 December 2022 1	Necaxa	0–0	Cruz Azul	Toluca
19:00 CDT				Stadium: Estadio Nemesio Díez

16 December 2022 2	Pumas UNAM	1–2	Cruz Azul	Ciudad Universitaria
19:00 CDT	Del Prete 10'		Rotondi 58'; Cruz 68'	Stadium: Estadio Olímpico Universitario

22 December 2022 3	Toluca	1–1	Cruz Azul	Toluca
19:00 CDT	Gamboa 90+1'		Gutiérrez 48'	Stadium: Nemesio Díez

27 December 2022 4	Cruz Azul	2–1	América	Toluca
19:00 CDT	Rotondi 7'; Estrada 45+4' (pen.)		Reyes 57'	Stadium: Nemesio Díez

30 December 2022 Final	Guadalajara	0–2	Cruz Azul	Zapopan
20:00 CDT			Gutiérrez 66'; Carneiro 86'	Stadium: Estadio Akron; Referee: Óscar Macías Romo

== Competitions ==
=== Overview ===
Competition	First match	Last match	Starting round	Final position	Record							
Competition	First match	Last match	Starting round	Final position	Pld	W	D	L	GF	GA	GD	Win %
Apertura 2022	2 July 2022	15 October 2022	Matchday 1	7th (quarter-finals)	20	8	4	8	27	37	−10	40.00
Clausura 2023	8 January 2023	6 May 2023	Matchday 1	8th (Reclassification)	18	7	3	8	21	23	−2	38.89
Supercopa de la Liga MX	26 June 2022		Final	Winners	1	0	1	0	2	2	+0	0.00
Total					39	15	8	16	50	62	−12	38.46

Last updated: 6 May 2023
Source: Mediotiempo.com

=== Liga MX ===
==== Torneo Apertura ====
===== League table =====
Pos	Team	Pld	W	D	L	GF	GA	GD	Pts	Qualification
5	UANL	17	9	3	5	24	14	+10	30	Qualification for the reclassification
6	Toluca	17	7	6	4	27	23	+4	27	Qualification for the reclassification
7	Cruz Azul	17	7	3	7	26	34	−8	24	Qualification for the reclassification
8	Puebla	17	4	10	3	24	22	+2	22	Qualification for the reclassification
9	Guadalajara	17	5	7	5	19	17	+2	22	Qualification for the reclassification

Source: Liga MX
Rules for classification: 1) Points; 2) Goal difference; 3) Number of goals scored; 4) Head-to-head results between tied teams; 5) Number of goals scored away; 6) Highest relegation coefficient; 7) Fair Play points

===== Results summary =====
Overall								Home						Away					
Pld	W	D	L	GF	GA	GD	Pts	W	D	L	GF	GA	GD	W	D	L	GF	GA	GD
20	8	4	8	27	37	−10	28	6	2	3	16	12	+4	2	2	5	11	25	−14

Last updated: 15 October 2022.
Source: Soccerway

===== Results round by round =====
Round	1	2	3	4	5	6	7	8	9	10	11	12	13	14	15	16	17	18	19	20
Ground	A	H	A	H	A	H	A	H	H	A	H	A	A	H	H	A	H	H	H	A
Result	W	L	L	D	D	W	L	L	L	L	W	D	L	W	W	W	W	W	D	L
Position	5	7	12	10	11	10	11	15	16	17	15	15	16	13	9	10	7	RE	QF	QF

Updated to match(es) played on 15 October 2022. Source: Mediotiempo.com
A = Away; H = Home; W = Win; D = Draw; L = Loss; QF = Quarter-finals; RE = Reclassification

===== Matches =====
2 July 2022 1	Tigres UANL	2–3	Cruz Azul	San Nicolás de los Garza
19:05 CDT	Thauvin 46'; Córdova 74'; Quiñones (yellow card) 90+1'	Report; Referee Report	Baca 15'; Romero 62'; Giménez 90+2' (pen.)	Stadium: Universitario; Attendance: 41,273; Referee: Óscar Mejía García

9 July 2022 2	Cruz Azul	1–2	Pachuca	Mexico City
21:05 CDT	Abram (yellow card) 49'; Mayorga (yellow card) 80'; Giménez 90+7' (pen.)	Report; Referee Report	Cabral 35'; Chávez 45'; Moreno (yellow card) 68'	Stadium: Azteca; Attendance: 17,148; Referee: Víctor Cáceres Hernández

16 July 2022 3	Atlas	3–2	Cruz Azul	Guadalajara
17:00 CDT	Herrera 9'; Santamaría (yellow card) 27'; Márquez 69'; Quiñones 81'	Report; Referee Report	Giménez 20'; Rodríguez (yellow card) 45'; Rotondi (red card) 45+4'; Lira (yellow card) 45+6'; Escobar (yellow card) 66'; Tabó (yellow card) 75' (goal) 85'	Stadium: Jalisco; Attendance: 13,185; Referee: Oscar Macías Romo

23 July 2022 4	Cruz Azul	2–2	Puebla	Mexico City
19:05 CDT	Giménez 22' (pen.), 25'; Rodríguez (yellow card) 30'; Escobar (yellow card) 38'	Report; Referee Report	Cortizo 2' (yellow card) 60'; Barragán 28'; Vázquez (yellow card) 46'	Stadium: Azteca; Attendance: 14,799; Referee: Fernando Guerrero Ramírez

26 July 2022 5	Atlético San Luis	0–0	Cruz Azul	San Luis Potosí
21:05 CDT	Güémez (yellow card) 31'; Cruz (yellow card) 31'; Castro (yellow card) 90+4'	Referee Report	Baca (yellow card) 35'; Rivero (yellow card) 45'; Antuna (yellow card) 72'; Martínez (yellow card) 82'; Tabó (yellow card) 90+4'	Stadium: Alfonso Lastras; Attendance: 17,628; Referee: Adonai Escobedo González

30 July 2022 6	Cruz Azul	1–0	Necaxa	Mexico City
17:00 CDT	Morales 37'; Martínez (yellow card) 55'; Romero (yellow card) 83'; Jurado (yellow card) 90+6'	Referee Report	Garnica (yellow card) 38'; Oliveros (yellow card) 42'; Araos (yellow card) 53'; Peña (yellow card) 66'	Stadium: Azteca; Attendance: 14,556; Referee: Erick Yair Miranda

6 August 2022 7	Santos Laguna	4–0	Cruz Azul	Torreón
21:05 CDT	Correa 17'; Rodríguez 47'; Aguirre 51'; Orrantia 56'	Referee Report		Stadium: Corona; Attendance: 15,350; Referee: Oscar Macías Romo

14 August 2022 8	Cruz Azul	2–3	Toluca	Mexico City
17:00 CDT	Funes Mori 18'; Carneiro (yellow card) 68'; Huescas 80'; Aguirre (red card) 89'; Baca (yellow card) 90'; Rivero (yellow card) 90'; Jurado (red card) 90+1'; Antuna (yellow card) 90+1'	Referee Report	Meneses 29'; Ruiz 42'; Huerta (yellow card) 43'; Volpi (yellow card) 61'; Sanvezzo 90+7' (pen.)	Stadium: Azteca; Attendance: 21,945; Referee: Fernando Hernández Gómez

17 August 2022 9	Cruz Azul	1–2	Tijuana	Mexico City
21:05 CDT	Rivero 20'	Referee Report	López (yellow card) 18'; Funes Mori 24' (o.g.); Montecinos (yellow card) 38'; Di Santo 65'	Stadium: Azteca; Attendance: 12,492; Referee: Diego Montaño Robles

20 August 2022 10	América	7–0	Cruz Azul	Mexico City
21:05 CDT	Sánchez 14'; Rodríguez 22'; Valdés 45+8'; Martín 52'; Fidalgo 72'; dos Santos (yellow card) 79'; Viñas 84'; Reyes 89'	Report; Referee Report	Rotondi (yellow card) 45+5'; Baca (red card) 45+7'	Stadium: Azteca; Attendance: 45,693; Referee: Luis Enrique Santander

27 August 2022 11	Cruz Azul	2–1	Querétaro	Mexico City
17:00 CDT	Estrada (yellow card) 25'; Rotondi 32' (yellow card) 59'; Carneiro (yellow card) 53'; Morales (red card) 55'; Rodríguez (yellow card) 80'; Tabó 82'; Corona (yellow card) 89'	Referee Report; Report	Sequeira (yellow card) 30'; Aboagye 77'; Aguerre (yellow card) 90+2'	Stadium: Azteca; Attendance: 11,545; Referee: Daniel Quintero Huitrón

2 September 2022 12	Juárez	2–2	Cruz Azul	Ciudad Juárez
19:05 MDT; 20:05 CDT	Salas (red card) 4'; Lainez (yellow card) 50'; Salcedo (yellow card) 53'; Lezcano 85'; Machís 90+8' (pen.)	Referee Report	Carneiro (yellow card) 9' (goal) 45+2'; Rivero (yellow card) 22'; Estrada 42' (pen.); Martínez (yellow card) 50'; Romero (yellow card) 58'; García (yellow card) 73'; Domínguez (yellow card) 84'; Jiménez (yellow card) 90+5'	Stadium: Olímpico Benito Juárez; Attendance: 13,602; Referee: Brian Omar Gonzalez

6 September 2022 13	Monterrey	3–2	Cruz Azul	Guadalupe
21:05 CDT	Gallardo 16'; Romo 28' (yellow card) 55'; Berterame 65'; Vegas (yellow card) 68'; Meza (yellow card) 89'; Medina 90+2'; Pizarro (yellow card) 90+4'	Referee Report	Rotondi 29'; Antuna 48'; Tabó (yellow card) 89'	Stadium: BBVA; Attendance: 28,371; Referee: Oscar Mejia Garcia

11 September 2022 14	Cruz Azul	2–0	Mazatlán	Mexico City
16:00 CDT	Carneiro 20'; Romero 45+6' (pen.)	Referee Report	Sandoval (red card) 35'; Colula (yellow card) 42'	Stadium: Azteca; Attendance: 11,543; Referee: César Arturo Ramos

15 September 2022 16	Cruz Azul	2–1	León	Mexico City
19:00 CDT	Domínguez (yellow card) 78'; Estrada 81'; Huescas (yellow card) 85'; Escoboza 90+2'	Referee Report	O. Rodríguez (yellow card) 35'; Alvarado (yellow card) 37'; Huescas 56' (o.g.)	Stadium: Azteca; Attendance: 10,255; Referee: Marco Antonio Ortiz

18 September 2022 15	Pumas UNAM	1–2	Cruz Azul	Ciudad Universitaria
17:00 CDT	Diogo 64'; Ruvalcaba (yellow card) 90'	Referee Report	Huescas 36'; Carneiro 44'; Baca (yellow card) 84'; Tabó (yellow card) 90+1'	Stadium: Olímpico Universitario; Attendance: 13,463; Referee: Fernando Guerrero Ramírez

1 October 2022 17	Cruz Azul	2–1	Guadalajara	Mexico City
21:05 CDT	Antuna 45+1' (yellow card) 45+2'; Rodríguez (yellow card) 45+3'; Estrada 90+2'	Report; Referee Report	Flores 67'; Sánchez (yellow card) 78'	Stadium: Azteca; Attendance: 35,378; Referee: César Arturo Ramos

1. Rescheduled match.

====== Reclassification ======
8 October 2022 Reclassification	Cruz Azul	1–0	León	Mexico City
21:15 CDT	Rivero 70'; Rodríguez (yellow card) 81'; Antuna (yellow card) 83'; Domínguez (yellow card) 88'	Report; Referee Report	Moreno (yellow card) 83'	Stadium: Azteca; Attendance: 22,291; Referee: Fernando Guerrero Ramírez

====== Quarter-finals ======
12 October 2022 First leg	Cruz Azul	0–0	Monterrey	Mexico City
21:06 CDT		Report; Referee Report	Meza (yellow card) 85'	Stadium: Azteca; Attendance: 24,571; Referee: Víctor Cáceres Hernández

15 October 2022 Second leg	Monterrey	3–0 (3–0 agg.)	Cruz Azul	Guadalupe
18:06 CDT	Luis Romo (yellow card) 2'; Berterame 19'; González (yellow card) 55'; Andrada (yellow card) 73'; É. Aguirre (yellow card) 77'; Funes Mori 85'; Gallardo 90+4' (yellow card) 90+4'	Report; Referee Report	Lira (yellow card) 84'	Stadium: BBVA; Attendance: 39,578; Referee: Adonai Escobedo González

==== Torneo Clausura ====
===== League table =====
Pos	Team	Pld	W	D	L	GF	GA	GD	Pts	Qualification
6	León	17	8	6	3	23	13	+10	30	Qualification for the reclassification
7	UANL (C)	17	7	4	6	20	17	+3	25	Qualification for the reclassification
8	Cruz Azul	17	7	3	7	21	22	−1	24	Qualification for the reclassification
9	Atlas	17	4	9	4	27	22	+5	21	Qualification for the reclassification
10	Querétaro	17	4	8	5	16	21	−5	20	Team ended last place in the coefficient table (Note: The last place team in the coefficient table could not qualify for the final phase; the 13th place team qualified in their stead.)

Source: Liga MX
Rules for classification: 1) Points; 2) Goal difference; 3) Number of goals scored; 4) Head-to-head results between tied teams; 5) Number of goals scored away; 6) Highest relegation coefficient; 7) Fair Play points
(C) Champions

===== Results summary =====
Overall								Home						Away					
Pld	W	D	L	GF	GA	GD	Pts	W	D	L	GF	GA	GD	W	D	L	GF	GA	GD
18	7	3	8	21	23	−2	24	5	0	4	10	10	0	2	3	4	11	13	−2

Last updated: 6 May 2023.
Source: Soccerway

===== Results round by round =====
Round	1	2	3	5	6	8	7^{1}	9	10	11	12	4^{2}	13	14	15	16	17	18
Ground	A	H	A	H	A	A	H	H	A	H	H	A	A	A	H	A	H	H
Result	D	L	L	L	L	W	W	W	L	W	W	D	W	D	L	L	W	L
Position	6	14	17	17^{*}	17^{*}	17^{*}	17^{†}	16^{†}	11^{*}	12^{*}	9^{*}	8^{*}	8	8	8	8	8	RE

Updated to match(es) played on 6 May 2023. Source: Mediotiempo.com
A = Away; H = Home; W = Win; D = Draw; L = Loss; RE = Reclassification
Notes:
^{1} Matchday 7 was originally scheduled on 15 February and rescheduled due to fixture congestion.

^{2} Matchday 4 was rescheduled to a date when attendance was permitted following the one-year ban on the Estadio Corregidora.

- *: One match pending.
- †: Two matches pending.

===== Matches =====
8 January 2023 1	Tijuana	1–1	Cruz Azul	Tijuana
19:10 PST; 21:10 CST	Li. Lopez 45' (pen.); Lértora (yellow card) 57'; Romero (yellow card) 67'; Canelo (yellow card) 75'	Report; Report; Referee Report	Rotondi (yellow card) 45'; Corona (yellow card) 45'; Rodríguez 83'	Stadium: Caliente; Attendance: 27,333; Referee: Daniel Quintero Huitrón

14 January 2023 2	Cruz Azul	2–3	Monterrey	Mexico City
17:00 CST	Escobar (yellow card) 24'; Antuna 27'; Estrada (yellow card) 49' (yellow-red card) 52'; Corona (yellow card) 61'; Berterame 80' (o.g.)	Report; Referee Report	Funes Mori 50'; Berterame 42', 75'; Govea (yellow card) 67'; Andrada (yellow card) 90'	Stadium: Azteca; Attendance: 16,873; Referee: César Arturo Ramos

21 January 2023 3	Necaxa	1–0	Cruz Azul	Aguascalientes
21:18 CST	Méndez 13' (yellow card) 50'; Batista (yellow card) 19'; Segovia (yellow card) 22'; Oliveros (yellow card) 34'; Poggi (yellow card) 48'; González (yellow card) 90+6'	Report; Referee Report	Antuna (yellow card) 24'; Corona (yellow card) 53'; Morales (yellow card) 90+8'	Stadium: Victoria; Attendance: 18,114; Referee: Jorge Abraham Camacho

4 February 2023 5	Cruz Azul	0–1	Tigres UANL	Mexico City
19:05 CST	Lira (yellow card) 45+3'	Referee Report	Pizarro 40'; Garza (yellow card) 71'	Stadium: Azteca; Attendance: 20,164; Referee: Luis Enrique Santander

12 February 2023 6	Toluca	3–1	Cruz Azul	Toluca
12:00 CST	Fernández (yellow card) 23'; Araújo 31', 53'; Mosquera (yellow card) 55'; Saucedo 86'	Referee Report	Domínguez (yellow card) 14'; Rotondi 28'; Carneiro (yellow card) 40'; Corona (yellow card) 50' (yellow-red card) 90+6'; Escobar (yellow card) 88'	Stadium: Nemesio Díez; Attendance: 27,273; Referee: Marco Antonio Ortiz

17 February 2023 8	Puebla	1–3	Cruz Azul	Puebla
21:05 CST	Aguilar (yellow card) 32'; Maia 76'; Mancuello (yellow card) 90+3'; Baltazar (yellow card) 90+4'	Report; Referee Report	Rodríguez 45+1'; Domínguez 58' (yellow card) 90+3'; Carneiro 62' (pen.); Rivero (yellow card) 78'	Stadium: Cuauhtémoc; Attendance: 21,927; Referee: Eduardo Galvan Basulto

22 February 2023 7 (Note: Rescheduled match.)	Cruz Azul	1–0	Atlas	Mexico City
20:05 CST	Lotti 76'; Escobar (yellow card) 90+4'; Funes Mori (yellow card) 90+4'; Rubio (AC) (red card) 90+5'	Report	Reyes (yellow card) 1'; Santamaría (yellow card) 57'; Aguirre (yellow card) 66'	Stadium: Azteca; Attendance: 39,254; Referee: César Arturo Ramos

25 February 2023 9	Cruz Azul	1–0	Juárez	Mexico City
17:00 CST	Antuna 14'; Rivero (yellow card) 80'; Escobar (yellow card) 90+4'	Report	Alvarado (yellow card) 23'; L. Rodríguez (yellow card) 87'	Stadium: Azteca; Attendance: 25,497; Referee: Oscar Macías Romo

3 March 2023 10	Mazatlán	3–1	Cruz Azul	Mazatlán
18:05 MST; 19:05 CST	Intriago (yellow card) 44'; Alanís 45+3'; Meraz 51'; Almada 56' (yellow card) 89'; Orona (yellow card) 80'	Report	Antuna 16'; Rodríguez (yellow card) 32'; Lira (yellow card) 54'	Stadium: Mazatlán; Attendance: 12,041; Referee: Jesús Rafael López

11 March 2023 11	Cruz Azul	1–0	Pumas UNAM	Mexico City
19:05 CST	Lira (yellow card) 13'; Rivero (yellow card) 26'; Escoboza 84'	Report	Freire (yellow card) 42'; Dinenno (yellow card) 45'; Sosa (yellow card) 82'; Sánchez (yellow card) 89'	Stadium: Azteca; Attendance: 23,499; Referee: Daniel Quintero Huitrón

18 March 2023 12	Cruz Azul	1–0	Atlético San Luis	Mexico City
17:00 CST	Lotti (yellow card) 22'; Escoboza (yellow card) 68'; Morales 81' (pen.)	Report	García (yellow card) 49'; Jardine (yellow card) 54'; Villalpando (yellow card) 57'; Barovero (yellow card) 80'; Merino (yellow card) 90+1'; Bilbao (yellow card) 90+6'	Stadium: Azteca; Attendance: 20,941; Referee: Guillermo Pacheco Larios

29 March 2023 4	Querétaro	2–2	Cruz Azul	Querétaro
21:05 CST	Fernández 56'; Barbieri 84'	Report	Escoboza 41'; Lotti 88'	Stadium: Corregidora; Attendance: 21,518; Referee: Óscar Mejía García

1 April 2023 13	Pachuca	0–2	Cruz Azul	Pachuca
17:00 CST		Report	Rotondi 8'; Huescas 66'	Stadium: Hidalgo; Attendance: 18,024; Referee: Luis Enrique Santander

8 April 2023 14	León	0–0	Cruz Azul	León
19:05 CST	Stiven Barreiro (yellow card) 20'; Paul Bellón (yellow card) 86'	Report	Guerrero (yellow card) 12'	Stadium: León; Attendance: 24,711; Referee: Diego Montaño Robles

15 April 2023 15	Cruz Azul	1–3	América	Mexico City
21:10 CST	Antuna 11' (yellow card) 55'; Estrada (red card) 45+2'; Erik Lira (yellow card) 47'; Rodríguez (yellow card) 64'	Report	Zendejas 41', 46'; Martín 62'; Fuentes (yellow card) 52'; Valdés (yellow card) 66'	Stadium: Azteca; Attendance: 66,634; Referee: Fernando Guerrero Ramírez

22 April 2023 16	Guadalajara	2–1	Cruz Azul	Zapopan
19:05 CST	Pérez (yellow card) 18'; Guzmán 52'; Cisneros 74' (yellow card) 83'; Mozo (yellow card) 80'; Briseño (yellow card) 88'	Report	Antuna 37'; Funes Mori (yellow card) 90' (yellow-red card) 90+5'	Stadium: Akron; Attendance: 33,456; Referee: Adonai Escobedo González

29 April 2023 17	Cruz Azul	3–2	Santos Laguna	Mexico City
21:05 CST	Lotti 30'; Huescas 40'; Antuna 63'	Report	Medina 86'; Correa 90+2' (pen.)	Stadium: Azteca; Attendance: 21,298; Referee: Luis Enrique Santander

====== Reclassification ======
6 May 2023 Reclassification	Cruz Azul	0–1	Atlas	Mexico City
17:00 CST	Funes Mori (yellow card) 48'; Carneiro (yellow card) 74'	Report	Lozano 1', (yellow card) 32'; Vargas (yellow card) 41'; Reyes (yellow card) 45+8'	Stadium: Azteca; Attendance: 49,826; Referee: César Arturo Ramos

=== Supercopa de la Liga MX ===
As the defending 2021 Campeón de Campeones winners, Cruz Azul qualified for the inaugural Supercopa de la Liga MX to face Atlas, who were automatically awarded the 2022 Campeón de Campeones title after winning both the Apertura 2021 and Clausura 2022 tournaments.

Win Draw Loss Fixtures

26 June 2022 Final	Atlas	2–2 (3–4 p)	Cruz Azul	Carson, United States
18:00 PDT	Nervo (yellow card) 23'; Santamaría (yellow card) 28'; Aguilera 41'; Quiñones 90+1', (yellow card) 90+3'; Flores (yellow card) 90+5'	Report	Giménez (yellow card) 44', (goal) 45+3'; Abram (yellow card) 55'; Romero 63'; Escobar (yellow card) 79'	Stadium: Dignity Health Sports Park; Attendance: 22,136; Referee: Jorge Antonio Pérez Durán
	Penalties
	Reyes (penalty scored); Flores (penalty missed); Rocha (penalty scored); Trejo (penalty scored); Quiñones (penalty missed)		(penalty scored) Romero; (penalty missed) Escobar; (penalty scored) Tabó; (penalty scored) Rodríguez; (penalty scored) Giménez

== Squad statistics ==
As of match played 6 May 2023

=== Appearances ===
Players with no appearances are not included on the list.

No.	Pos.	Nat.	Player	Liga MX Apertura		Liga MX Clausura		Supercopa de la Liga MX		Total	
No.	Pos.	Nat.	Player	Apps	Starts	Apps	Starts	Apps	Starts	Apps	Starts
1	GK	(Mexico)	José de Jesús Corona	10	10	17	17	0	0	27	27
3	DF	(Mexico)	Jaiber Jiménez	3	3	0	0	0	0	3	3
4	DF	(Mexico)	Julio César Domínguez	18	17	15	15	1	1	34	33
6	MF	(Mexico)	Érik Lira	18	16	18	18	1	1	37	35
7	MF	(Mexico)	Uriel Antuna	19	18	16	16	1	1	36	35
8	FW	(Uruguay)	Gonzalo Carneiro	14	8	10	4	0	0	24	12
11	FW	(Uruguay)	Christian Tabó	16	4	9	3	1	1	26	8
12	DF	(Mexico)	José Joaquín Martínez	6	4	5	2	0	0	11	6
13	FW	(Ecuador)	Michael Estrada	11	6	13	6	0	0	24	12
14	MF	(Mexico)	Alexis Gutiérrez	0	0	5	3	0	0	5	3
15	MF	(Uruguay)	Ignacio Rivero	17	16	18	18	1	1	36	35
17	MF	(Mexico)	Alonso Escoboza	10	1	6	2	0	0	16	3
18	MF	(Mexico)	Rodrigo Huescas	15	7	16	9	0	0	31	16
19	MF	(Mexico)	Carlos Rodríguez	20	16	18	17	1	0	39	33
20	FW	(Chile)	Iván Morales	8	2	10	2	0	0	18	4
21	MF	(Argentina)	Augusto Lotti	0	0	16	6	0	0	16	6
22	DF	(Mexico)	Rafael Baca	13	7	8	2	1	0	22	9
23	MF	(Argentina)	Ramiro Carrera	0	0	10	3	0	0	10	3
24	DF	(Paraguay)	Juan Escobar	14	13	17	17	1	1	32	31
25	DF	(Argentina)	Ramiro Funes Mori	8	8	17	17	0	0	25	25
26	DF	(Mexico)	Carlos Vargas	0	0	1	1	0	0	1	1
28	DF	(Mexico)	Jordan Silva	0	0	4	1	0	0	4	1
29	FW	(Argentina)	Carlos Rotondi	16	13	16	15	0	0	32	28
33	GK	(Mexico)	Sebastián Jurado	10	10	1	1	1	1	12	12
183 (Note: Player registered with the under-20 team.)	DF	(Mexico)	Rafael Guerrero	10	7	3	3	0	0	13	10
200	DF	(Mexico)	Jorge García	1	0	0	0	0	0	1	0
206	MF	(Mexico)	Cristian Jiménez	1	0	0	0	0	0	1	0
Players who have made an appearance or had a squad number this season but have left the club
2	DF	(Mexico)	Alejandro Mayorga	5	5	0	0	1	1	6	6
5	DF	(Peru)	Luis Abram	15	13	0	0	1	1	16	14
9	FW	(Mexico)	Santiago Giménez	5	5	0	0	1	1	6	6
10	FW	(Paraguay)	Ángel Romero	18	11	0	0	1	1	19	12

=== Goalscorers ===
Includes all competitive matches.

Rank	Pos.	No.	Player	Liga MX Apertura	Liga MX Clausura	Supercopa de la Liga MX	Total
1	FW	7	(Mexico) Uriel Antuna	2	6	0	8
2	FW	9	(Mexico) Santiago Giménez	5	–	1	6
3	FW	8	(Uruguay) Gonzalo Carneiro	3	1	–	4
3	FW	29	(Argentina) Carlos Rotondi	2	2	–	4
3	MF	18	(Mexico) Rodrigo Huescas	2	2	0	4
6	FW	10	(Paraguay) Ángel Romero	2	–	1	3
6	FW	13	(Ecuador) Michael Estrada	3	0	–	3
6	MF	17	(Mexico) Alonso Escoboza	1	2	–	3
6	FW	21	(Argentina) Augusto Lotti	–	3	–	3
10	FW	11	(Uruguay) Christian Tabó	2	0	0	2
10	MF	15	(Uruguay) Ignacio Rivero	2	0	0	2
10	MF	19	(Mexico) Carlos Rodríguez	0	2	0	2
10	MF	20	(Chile) Iván Morales	1	1	0	2
14	MF	22	(Mexico) Rafael Baca	1	0	0	1
14	MF	25	(Argentina) Ramiro Funes Mori	1	0	–	1
14	DF	4	(Mexico) Julio César Domínguez	0	1	0	1
Own goals				0	1	0	1
Total				27	21	2	50

Sources: Soccerway, Liga MX

=== Clean sheets ===
The list is sorted by shirt number when total clean sheets are equal. Numbers in parentheses represent games where both goalkeepers participated and both kept a clean sheet; the number in parentheses is awarded to the goalkeeper who was substituted on, whilst a full clean sheet is awarded to the goalkeeper who was on the field at the start of play.

No.	Player	Games Played	Goals Against	Liga MX Apertura	Liga MX Clausura	Supercopa de la Liga MX	Total
1	(Mexico) José de Jesús Corona	20	24	3	4	0	7
33	(Mexico) Sebastián Jurado	12	28	2	0	0	2
Totals			52	5	4	0	9

=== Disciplinary record ===
No.	Pos.	Nat.	Player	Liga MX Apertura			Liga MX Clausura			Supercopa de la Liga MX			Total		
No.	Pos.	Nat.	Player	Yellow card	(yellow card) (yellow-red card)	Red card	Yellow card	(yellow card) (yellow-red card)	Red card	Yellow card	(yellow card) (yellow-red card)	Red card	Yellow card	(yellow card) (yellow-red card)	Red card
1	GK	(Mexico)	José de Jesús Corona	1	0	0	4	1	0	0	0	0	5	1	0
2	DF	(Mexico)	Alejandro Mayorga	1	0	0	0	0	0	0	0	0	1	0	0
3	DF	(Mexico)	Jaiber Jiménez	1	0	0	0	0	0	0	0	0	1	0	0
4	DF	(Mexico)	Julio César Domínguez	3	0	0	2	0	0	0	0	0	5	0	0
5	DF	(Peru)	Luis Abram	1	0	0	0	0	0	1	0	0	2	0	0
6	MF	(Mexico)	Erik Lira	2	0	0	3	0	0	0	0	0	5	0	0
7	FW	(Mexico)	Uriel Antuna	4	0	0	1	0	0	0	0	0	5	0	0
8	FW	(Uruguay)	Gonzalo Carneiro	3	0	0	1	0	0	0	0	0	4	0	0
9	FW	(Mexico)	Santiago Giménez	0	0	0	0	0	0	1	0	0	1	0	0
10	FW	(Paraguay)	Ángel Romero	2	0	0	0	0	0	0	0	0	2	0	0
11	FW	(Uruguay)	Christian Tabó	4	0	0	0	0	0	0	0	0	4	0	0
12	DF	(Mexico)	José Joaquín Martínez	3	0	0	0	0	0	0	0	0	3	0	0
13	FW	(Ecuador)	Michael Estrada	1	0	0	1	1	0	0	0	0	2	1	0
15	MF	(Uruguay)	Ignacio Rivero	3	0	0	3	0	0	0	0	0	6	0	0
17	MF	(Mexico)	Alonso Escoboza	0	0	0	1	0	0	0	0	0	1	0	0
18	MF	(Mexico)	Rodrigo Huescas	1	0	0	0	0	0	0	0	0	1	0	0
19	MF	(Mexico)	Carlos Rodríguez	5	0	0	1	0	0	0	0	0	6	0	0
20	FW	(Chile)	Iván Morales	0	0	1	1	0	0	0	0	0	1	0	1
21	FW	(Argentina)	Augusto Lotti	0	0	0	1	0	0	0	0	0	1	0	0
22	MF	(Mexico)	Rafael Baca	3	0	1	0	0	0	0	0	0	3	0	1
24	DF	(Paraguay)	Juan Escobar	2	0	0	4	0	0	1	0	0	7	0	0
25	DF	(Argentina)	Ramiro Funes Mori	0	0	0	1	0	0	0	0	0	1	0	0
29	FW	(Argentina)	Carlos Rotondi	2	0	1 (Note: Red card was appealed and suspension was rescinded.)	1	0	0	0	0	0	3	0	1
33	GK	(Mexico)	Sebastián Jurado	1	0	1	0	0	0	0	0	0	1	0	1
200	DF	(Mexico)	Jorge García	1	0	0	0	0	0	0	0	0	1	0	0
Coach		(Uruguay)	Diego Aguirre	0	0	1	0	0	0	0	0	0	0	0	1
Coach		(Mexico)	Juan Rubio (Kinesiologist)	0	0	0	0	0	1	0	0	0	0	0	1
Totals				44	0	5	25	2	1	3	0	0	72	2	6

Ordered by (red card) , (second yellow card) and (yellow card)
(yellow card) = Number of bookings; (second yellow card) = Number of sending offs after a second yellow card; (red card) = Number of sending offs by a direct red card.
