= Jorge García (footballer, born 2002) =

Mexican footballer

Personal information
- Full name: Jorge Luis García Rivas
- Date of birth: 22 January 2002 (age 24)
- Place of birth: Tlahuelilpan, Hidalgo, Mexico
- Height: 1.70 m (5 ft 7 in)
- Position: Defensive midfielder

Team information
- Current team: Cruz Azul Hidalgo
- Number: 42

Youth career
- 2017–2025: Cruz Azul

Senior career*
| Years | Team | Apps | (Gls) |
| 2018– | Cruz Azul | 8 | (0) |
| 2025 | → Celaya (loan) | 12 | (0) |
| 2025–2026 | → Mazatlán (loan) | 6 | (0) |
| 2026– | Cruz Azul Hidalgo | 0 | (0) |

International career^{‡}
| 2017 | Mexico U15 | 2 | (0) |
| 2018 | Mexico U17 | 2 | (0) |
- * Club domestic league appearances and goals as of 18 October 2026 ‡ National team caps and goals as of 19 September 2022

Jorge Luis García Rivas (born 22 January 2002) is a Mexican professional footballer who plays as a defensive midfielder for Liga de Expansión MX club Cruz Azul Hidalgo.

== Career statistics ==
As of 18 October 2026

Appearances and goals by club, season and competition
| Club | Season | League | | | Cup | | Continental | | Other | | Total | |
| Club | Season | Division | Apps | Goals | Apps | Goals | Apps | Goals | Apps | Goals | Apps | Goals |
|---|---|---|---|---|---|---|---|---|---|---|---|---|
| Cruz Azul | 2018–19 | Liga MX | 1 | 0 | 1 | 0 | — | | — | | 2 | 0 |
| Cruz Azul | 2019–20 | Liga MX | — | | — | | 1 (Note: Appearance in CONCACAF Champions League) | 0 | — | | 1 | 0 |
| Cruz Azul | 2020–21 | Liga MX | — | | — | | — | | 3 (Note: Appearances in Copa GNP por México) | 0 | 3 | 0 |
| Cruz Azul | 2022–23 | Liga MX | 1 | 0 | — | | — | | 3 (Note: Appearances in Copa Sky por México) | 0 | 4 | 0 |
| Cruz Azul | 2023–24 | Liga MX | 2 | 0 | — | | — | | — | | 2 | 0 |
| Cruz Azul | 2024–25 | Liga MX | 4 | 0 | — | | — | | — | | 4 | 0 |
| Cruz Azul | Total | | 8 | 0 | 1 | 0 | 1 | 0 | 6 | 0 | 16 | 0 |
| Celaya (loan) | 2024–25 | Liga de Expansión MX | 12 | 0 | — | | — | | — | | 12 | 0 |
| Mazatlán (loan) | 2025–26 | Liga MX | 6 | 0 | — | | — | | 2 (Note: Appearances in Leagues Cup) | 0 | 8 | 0 |
| Career total | | | 26 | 0 | 1 | 0 | 1 | 0 | 8 | 0 | 35 | 0 |

== Honours ==
Cruz Azul

- Liga MX: Guardianes 2021
- Copa MX: Apertura 2018
- Supercopa de la Liga MX: 2022
