= Carlos Rodríguez (footballer, born 1997) =

Mexican footballer (born 1997)

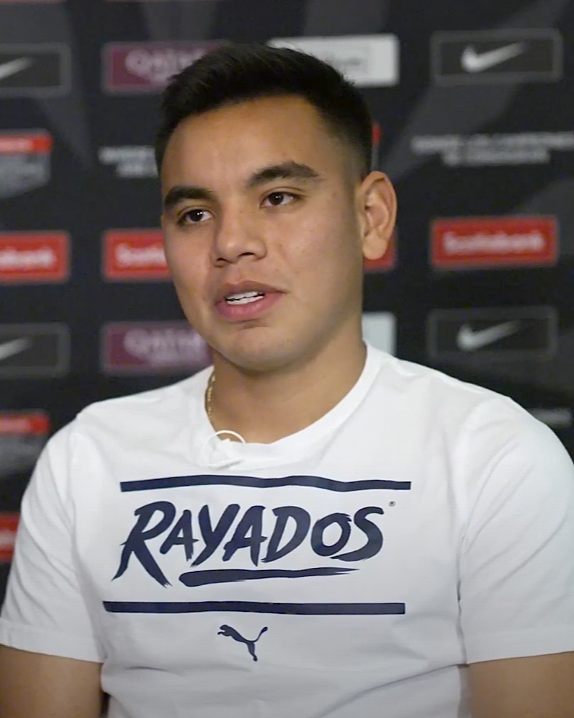
- Rodríguez with Monterrey in 2021

Personal information
- Full name: Carlos Alberto Rodríguez Gómez
- Date of birth: 3 January 1997 (age 29)
- Place of birth: San Nicolás de los Garza, Nuevo León, Mexico
- Height: 1.71 m (5 ft 7 in)
- Position: Midfielder

Team information
- Current team: Cruz Azul
- Number: 19

Youth career
- 2012–2017: Monterrey

Senior career*
Years	Team	Apps	(Gls)
2016–2021	Monterrey	110	(4)
2017–2018	→ Toledo (loan)	30	(3)
2022–	Cruz Azul	187	(15)

International career^{‡}
2021	Mexico U23	10	(1)
2019–2026	Mexico	67	(0)
Medal record
Men's football
Representing Mexico
CONCACAF Gold Cup
Winner	2025 United States–Canada	Team
Winner	2023 United States–Canada	Team
Winner	2019 United States	Team
CONCACAF Nations League
Runner-up	2024 United States
Runner-up	2021 United States
Third place	2023 United States
Olympic Games
Bronze medal – third place	2020 Tokyo	Team
Olympic Qualifying Championship
Winner	2020 Mexico
- * Club domestic league appearances and goals as of 7 November 2026 ‡ National team caps and goals as of 22:10, 28 March 2026 (UTC)

Carlos Alberto "Charly" Rodríguez Gómez (born 3 January 1997) is a Mexican professional footballer who plays as a midfielder and serves as vice-captain for Liga MX club Cruz Azul and the Mexico national team.

Starting at the Monterrey youth academy, Rodríguez made his official debut for the senior team in 2016. He briefly went on loan in Spain with Toledo before returning to Monterrey in 2018. During his tenure with Los Rayados, Rodríguez won one league title, one Copa MX title, and two CONCACAF Champions League titles, while making over 100 appearances and scoring four goals for the club. Since joining Cruz Azul in 2022, Rodríguez has won a league title, a Supercopa de la Liga MX, a Campeón de Campeones, and a CONCACAF Champions Cup title, captaining the side to the Liga MX title in 2026.

Rodríguez made his debut for Mexico in March 2019. He was involved in the squads that won the 2019, 2023 and 2025 CONCACAF Gold Cup, as well as the 2024–25 CONCACAF Nations League. With the U23 team, Rodríguez won the 2020 CONCACAF Men's Olympic Qualifying Championship and the bronze medal at the 2020 Summer Olympics in Tokyo.

== Club career ==
=== Monterrey ===
==== 2016–17: Debut season ====
Rodríguez originally hailed from C.F. Monterrey's youth academy. He made his professional debut with Monterrey on 28 September 2016, in a 2016–17 CONCACAF Champions League group stage match against Don Bosco, winning 3–0.

==== 2017–18: Loan to Toledo ====
Loaned out to Spanish third division team Toledo, he made 30 league appearances along with scoring three goals.

==== 2018–19: Return to Monterrey, Copa MX, and first CONCACAF Champions League title ====
Returning to Monterrey for the 2018–19 season, he made his Liga MX debut on 20 October 2018, coming on as a substitute in a 2–1 victory over Toluca. He would score his first goal with Monterrey on 15 February 2019, in a 3–2 victory over Monarcas Morelia. He would prove to be a vital part of the club as they would win the 2019 CONCACAF Champions League Finals against town rivals Tigres UANL and be included in the competition's Team of the Tournament.

==== 2019–20: First league title and El Triplete ====
On 14 December, in the 2019 FIFA Club World Cup quarter-final match against Al Sadd, he would score Monterrey's third goal in a 3–2 victory. At the end of the month, he disputed in both legs of the Apertura championship finals against América. He would score an own goal in the first leg but Monterrey eventually won the match with a 2–1 score. After a 1–2 loss in the second leg, Monterrey would win the finals after defeating América in a penalty shoot-out. He was eventually included in the Best XI of the Apertura 2019.

With Monterrey's victory of the 2019–20 Copa MX, they had obtained the continental treble.

==== 2021–22: Second CONCACAF Champions League title and departure ====
On 28 December 2021, it was confirmed that Rodríguez would sign for Cruz Azul in an exchange deal for Luis Romo.

=== Cruz Azul ===
==== 2021–22: Transfer, debut and first title ====
On 6 January 2022, Cruz Azul officially announced the signing of Rodríguez with a four-year contract. He made his debut for the club on 9 January 2022, starting in a 2–0 win over Tijuana on the opening matchday of the Clausura 2022, scoring the opening goal with a first-half header from a cross by Adrián Aldrete. On 8 April 2022, he suffered a fibula fracture in a league match against Mazatlán that ended his participation in the tournament; Cruz Azul went on to be eliminated in the Clausura 2022 quarter-finals by Tigres UANL.

Rodríguez returned from injury on 26 June 2022, coming on as a half-time substitute for Ignacio Rivero in the Supercopa de la Liga MX match against Atlas. The match finished 2–2 after normal time, and Rodríguez converted his attempt as Cruz Azul won 4–3 on penalties, his first title with the club.

==== 2022–24: Squad mainstay ====
By November 2024, Rodríguez had made over 100 appearances for Cruz Azul, contributing six goals and twelve assists, and had become a key player under manager Martín Anselmi, who led the club to the top of the standings in both halves of that year without securing a title. In July of that year, he was selected for the Liga MX All-Stars squad for the 2024 MLS All-Star Game, starting the match as a midfielder alongside André-Pierre Gignac and Jonathan dos Santos.

==== 2024–25: CONCACAF Champions Cup title ====
Cruz Azul reached the final of the 2025 CONCACAF Champions Cup, with Rodríguez scoring in a 4–1 win over Seattle Sounders FC in the round of 16. On 1 June 2025, in the final against Vancouver Whitecaps FC, he provided an assist as Cruz Azul won 5–0 at the Estadio Olímpico Universitario to win a title that tied crosstown rivals América for the competition's all-time record, and Cruz Azul's first since 2014. He was subsequently named to the tournament's Best XI.

On 19 August 2025, amid interest from European clubs, Rodríguez signed a contract extension with Cruz Azul until December 2029.

==== 2025–26: Captaincy and the Clausura 2026 title ====
Rodríguez had one of the best individual seasons of his career in the Apertura 2025, contributing to nine goals in all competitions and ranking among Liga MX's top creators, averaging 2.6 key passes per game; he was named to the Liga MX Best XI for the tournament.

As Cruz Azul's vice-captain, Rodríguez assumed the captaincy for the club's liguilla run in April 2026, after regular captain Érik Lira was called up to Mexico's squad for the 2026 FIFA World Cup and released by the club to join the national team's training camp. Despite having also been part of the Mexico national team's World Cup preparation process, Rodríguez himself was left out of the final squad later that same month. He scored a decisive goal in the Clausura 2026 semi-finals against Guadalajara that helped send Cruz Azul into the final. On 24 May 2026, Cruz Azul defeated Pumas UNAM 2–1 on aggregate in the final to win the club's tenth league title. Lira, who had missed the liguilla due to his World Cup call-up, was granted special permission to attend and joined Rodríguez in lifting the trophy. He was again included in the Liga MX Best XI for the tournament and, the following month, was selected for the Liga MX All-Stars at the 2026 MLS All-Star Game.

== International career ==
=== Youth ===
==== 2020–21: Olympic Qualifying Championship and Summer Olympics ====
Rodríguez participated at the 2020 CONCACAF Olympic Qualifying Championship, scoring one goal in all five matches, where Mexico won the competition. He was subsequently called up to participate in the 2020 Summer Olympics. Rodríguez won the bronze medal with the Olympic team.

=== Senior ===
==== 2019: Beginnings and first CONCACAF Gold Cup ====
Five months after his Liga MX debut, Rodríguez was included in Gerardo Martino's first minicamp, and on 22 March 2019, he made his debut for the senior national team in a friendly against Chile, as a starter. Following his debut, Martino stated "Carlos Rodríguez plays like he plays, which looks like a 30-year-old."

In May 2019, Rodríguez was included in the preliminary roster for the 2019 CONCACAF Gold Cup and was included in the final list. He would appear in all matches of the tournament as Mexico went on to win the final against the United States.

==== 2022: First FIFA World Cup ====
In October 2022, Rodríguez was named in Mexico's preliminary 31-man squad for the 2022 FIFA World Cup, and in November, he was ultimately included in the final 26-man roster.

== Personal life ==
On 6 October 2020, Rodríguez tested positive for COVID-19. Following a self-imposed quarantine, he resumed training with Monterrey about two weeks later.

== Career statistics ==
=== Club ===
As of match played on 7 November 2026

Appearances and goals by club, season and competition
Club	Season	League			National cup (Note: Includes Copa MX)		Continental (Note: Includes CONCACAF Champions League/Cup)		Other		Total	
Club	Season	Division	Apps	Goals	Apps	Goals	Apps	Goals	Apps	Goals	Apps	Goals
Monterrey	2016–17	Liga MX	—		—		1	0	—		1	0
Monterrey	2018–19	Liga MX	26	1	7	1	8	0	—		41	2
Monterrey	2019–20	Liga MX	32	1	7	1	—		2 (Note: Appearances in FIFA Club World Cup)	1	41	3
Monterrey	2020–21	Liga MX	35	1	—		6	0	—		41	1
Monterrey	2021–22	Liga MX	17	1	—		—		—		17	1
Monterrey	Total		110	4	14	2	15	0	2	1	141	7
Toledo (loan)	2017–18	Segunda División B	30	3	—		—		—		30	3
Cruz Azul	2021–22	Liga MX	12	3	—		4	0	—		16	3
Cruz Azul	2022–23	Liga MX	38	2	—		—		1 (Note: Appearance in Supercopa de la Liga MX)	0	39	2
Cruz Azul	2023–24	Liga MX	36	1	—		—		3 (Note: Appearances in Leagues Cup)	0	39	1
Cruz Azul	2024–25	Liga MX	41	0	—		7	1	4	0	52	1
Cruz Azul	2025–26	Liga MX	44	8	—		6	0	4 (Note: Three appearances and one goal in Leagues Cup, one appearance in FIFA Intercontinental Cup)	1	54	9
Cruz Azul	2026–27	Liga MX	16	1	—		—		5 (Note: One appearance and one goal in Campeón de Campeones, three appearances in Leagues Cup, one appearance in Campeones Cup)	1	21	2
Cruz Azul	Total		187	15	0	0	17	1	17	2	221	18
Career total			327	22	14	2	32	1	19	3	392	28

=== International ===
As of match played on 28 March 2026

Appearances and goals by national team and year
National team	Year	Apps	Goals
Mexico	2019	12 (Note: Rodríguez additionally played a match against Martinique in 2019, which is not recognized by FIFA.)	0
Mexico	2020	3	0
Mexico	2021	10	0
Mexico	2022	13	0
Mexico	2023	10	0
Mexico	2024	7	0
Mexico	2025	8	0
Mexico	2026	4	0
Total		67	0

== Honours ==
Monterrey

- Liga MX: Apertura 2019
- Copa MX: 2019–20
- CONCACAF Champions League: 2019, 2021

Cruz Azul

- Liga MX: Clausura 2026
- Campeón de Campeones: 2026
- Supercopa de la Liga MX: 2022
- CONCACAF Champions Cup: 2025

Mexico U23

- CONCACAF Olympic Qualifying Championship: 2020
- Olympic Bronze Medal: 2020

Mexico

- CONCACAF Gold Cup: 2019, 2023, 2025
- CONCACAF Nations League: 2024–25

Individual

- Liga MX Best XI: Apertura 2019, Apertura 2025, Clausura 2026
- CONCACAF Champions League Best XI: 2019, 2025
- Liga MX All-Star: 2024, 2026
