= Bernald Alfaro =

Costa Rican footballer (born 1997)

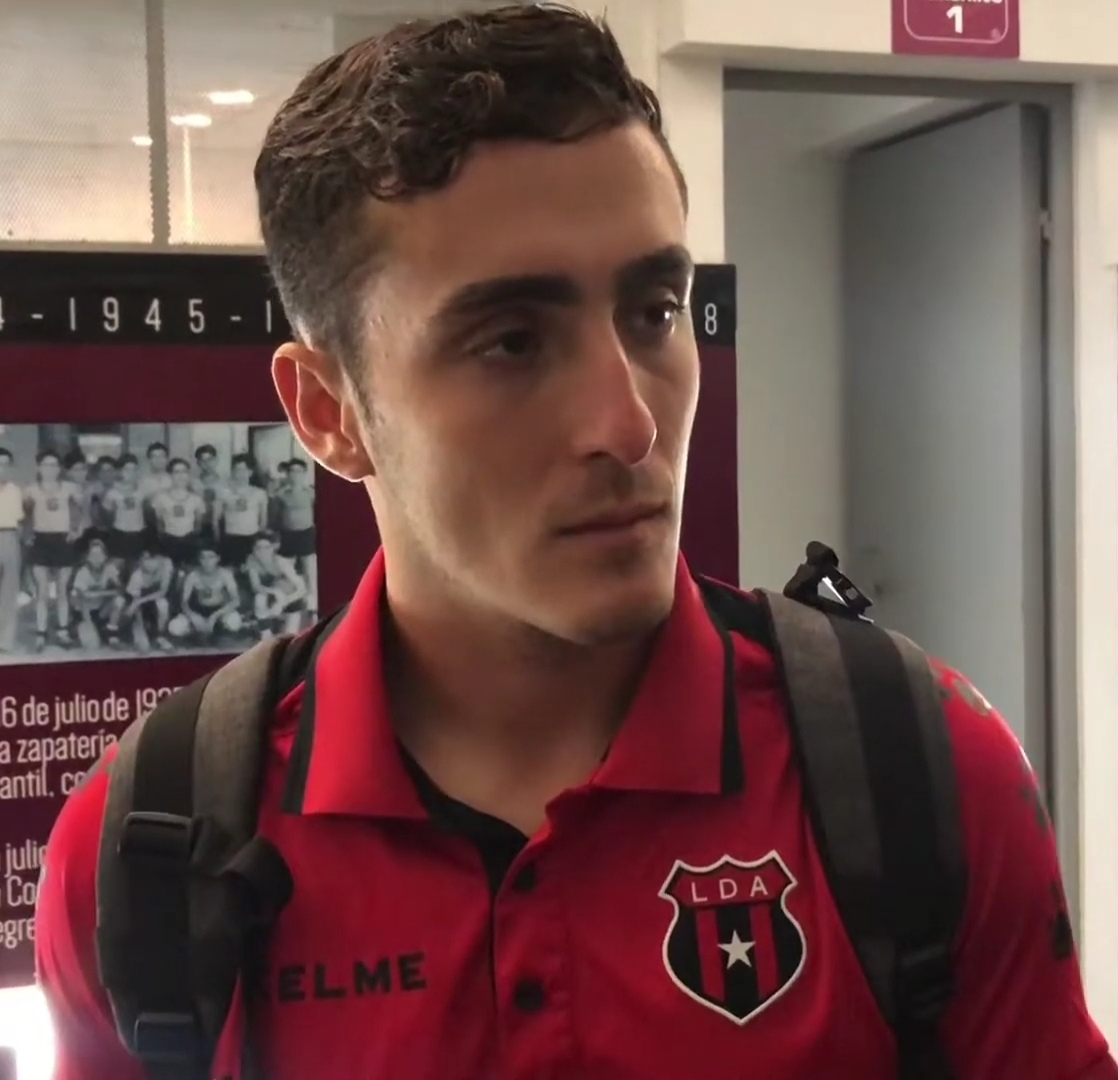

Personal information
- Full name: Bernald Alfaro Alfaro
- Date of birth: 26 January 1997 (age 29)
- Place of birth: Alajuela, Costa Rica
- Height: 1.77 m (5 ft 10 in)
- Position: Midfielder

Team information
- Current team: Cartaginés
- Number: 26

Youth career
- Carmelita

Senior career*
Years	Team	Apps	(Gls)
2015–2022	Carmelita	86	(9)
2019–2022	→ Alajuelense (loan)	117	(6)
2023–	Cartaginés	22	(1)

International career
2016–2017	Costa Rica U20	6	(0)
2018	Costa Rica U21	2	(0)
2021	Costa Rica U23	3	(1)
2020–2021	Costa Rica	4	(0)
Medal record
Men's football
Representing Costa Rica
Central American Games
Silver medal – second place	2017 Managua
- * Club domestic league appearances and goals as of 7 May 2025

Bernald Alfaro Alfaro (born 26 January 1997) is a Costa Rican professional footballer who plays as a midfielder for Liga FPD club Cartaginés.

== Club career ==
A youth academy graduate of Carmelita, Alfaro made his professional debut on 6 May 2015 in a 2–3 league defeat against Saprissa. On 23 May 2019, Alajuelense announced the loan signing of Alfaro for three seasons. In February 2020, he extended his loan contract with the club until June 2024.

== International career ==
Alfaro has represented Costa Rica at different age level tournaments. He was part of Costa Rica U20 team for 2017 CONCACAF U-20 Championship and 2017 FIFA U-20 World Cup. He was also part of the team which won silver medal at the 2017 Central American Games.

On 1 February 2020, Alfaro made his senior debut for Costa Rica in a 0–1 friendly loss against United States.

== Career statistics ==
=== International ===
As of 10 June 2021

Appearances and goals by national team and year
National team	Year	Apps	Goals
Costa Rica	2020	2	0
Costa Rica	2021	2	0
Total		4	0
