= Ángel Romero (footballer) =

Paraguayan footballer (born 1992)

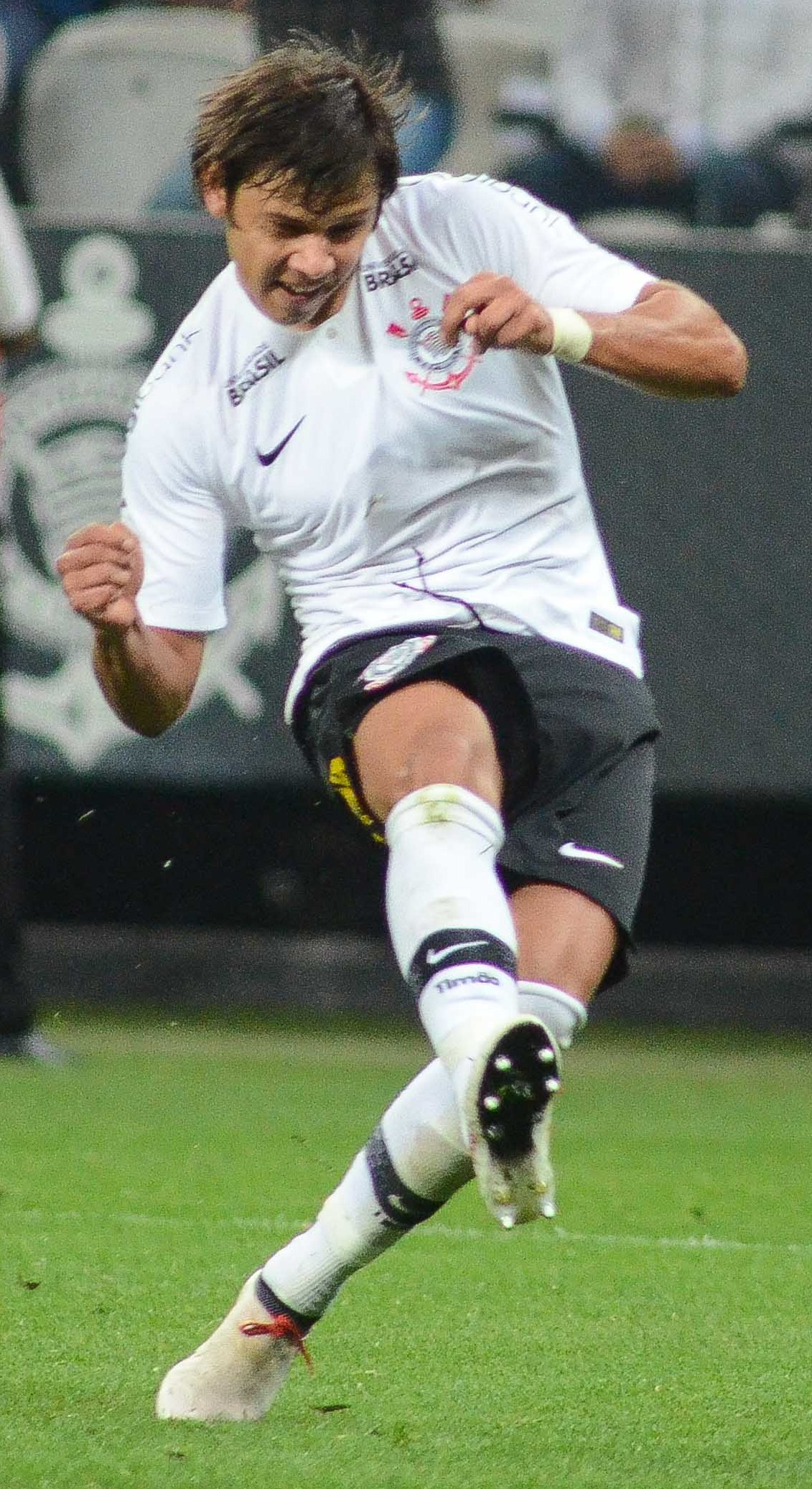
- Romero with Corinthians in 2018

Personal information
- Full name: Ángel Rodrigo Romero Villamayor
- Date of birth: 4 July 1992 (age 34)
- Place of birth: Fernando de la Mora, Paraguay
- Height: 1.77 m (5 ft 10 in)
- Position: Winger

Team information
- Current team: Boca Juniors
- Number: 11

Youth career
- 2008–2011: Cerro Porteño

Senior career*
Years	Team	Apps	(Gls)
2011–2014	Cerro Porteño	69	(30)
2014–2018	Corinthians	168	(25)
2019–2021	San Lorenzo	45	(11)
2022	Cruz Azul	33	(3)
2023–2025	Corinthians	111	(20)
2026–	Boca Juniors	15	(3)

International career^{‡}
2013–	Paraguay	49	(8)
- * Club domestic league appearances and goals as of 17 October 2026 ‡ National team caps and goals as of 10 June 2025

Ángel Rodrigo Romero Villamayor (born 4 July 1992) is a Paraguayan professional footballer who plays as a winger for Argentine Primera División club Boca Juniors and the Paraguay national team. He is the twin brother of Óscar Romero.

== Club career ==
=== Cerro Porteño ===
Romero made his senior league debut for Cerro Porteño on 15 May 2011, playing the full 90 minutes in a 1–0 loss to General Caballero.

=== Corinthians ===
On 3 June 2014, it was reported that Romero would be transferred to Brazil's Sport Club Corinthians Paulista where he would sign a five-year contract.

=== San Lorenzo ===
On 8 August 2019, he signed with San Lorenzo for three seasons. On 31 August, he scored his first goal for the club, in a 2–1 victory over Unión, in a match valid for the Argentine Championship. On 18 August 2020, Romero injured teammate Andrés Herrera, causing a fracture of his leg. The tackle was heavily criticized by teammates, and Romero was made to train separate from the team by manager Mariano Soso. On 28 August 2021, the club announced the termination of the contract with Romero in order to comply with the Financial Fair Play implemented by the LPF.

=== Cruz Azul ===
On 2 February 2022, he was announced by Cruz Azul, with a contract valid until December 2022.

== International career ==
Romero made his debut for Paraguay on 6 September 2013, playing 65 minutes in a 2014 FIFA World Cup qualification (CONMEBOL) 4–0 win over Bolivia.

== Career statistics ==
=== Club ===
As of match played 2 October 2026

Appearances and goals by club, season and competition
Club	Season	League			State league (Note: Includes Campeonato Paulista)		National cup (Note: Includes Copa do Brasil, Copa Argentina)		Continental		Other		Total	
Club	Season	Division	Apps	Goals	Apps	Goals	Apps	Goals	Apps	Goals	Apps	Goals	Apps	Goals
Cerro Porteño	2011	Paraguayan Primera División	6	1	—		—		—		—		6	1
Cerro Porteño	2012	Paraguayan Primera División	9	3	—		—		0	0	—		9	3
Cerro Porteño	2013	Paraguayan Primera División	42	15	—		—		4 (Note: Two appearances in Copa Libertadores, two appearances in Copa Sudamericana)	0	—		46	15
Cerro Porteño	2014	Paraguayan Primera División	12	11	—		—		7 (Note: Appearances in Copa Libertadores)	1	—		19	12
Cerro Porteño	Total		69	30	—		—		11	1	—		80	31
Corinthians	2014	Série A	21	0	—		5	1	0	0	—		26	1
Corinthians	2015	Série A	12	3	4	0	1	1	0	0	—		17	4
Corinthians	2016	Série A	27	5	17	5	3	1	6	2	—		53	13
Corinthians	2017	Série A	30	3	15	2	5	1	5 (Note: Appearances in Copa Sudamericana)	0	—		55	6
Corinthians	2018	Série A	27	6	15	1	8	3	8	1	—		58	11
Corinthians	Total		117	17	51	8	22	7	19	3	—		209	35
San Lorenzo	2019–20	Argentine Primera División	20	5	—		0	0	—		1 (Note: Appearances in Copa de la Superliga)	0	21	5
San Lorenzo	2020–21	Argentine Primera División	8 (Note: Soccerway counts Copa de la Liga Profesional appearances as league appearances)	4	—		2	0	4	3	—		14	7
San Lorenzo	2021	Argentine Primera División	17	2	—		0	0	3	0	—		20	2
San Lorenzo	Total		45	11	—		2	0	7	3	1	0	55	14
Cruz Azul	2021–22	Liga MX	15	1	—		—		5 (Note: Appearances in CONCACAF Champions League)	1	—		20	2
Cruz Azul	2022–23	Liga MX	18	2	—		—		—		1 (Note: Appearance in Supercopa de la Liga MX)	1	19	3
Cruz Azul	Total		33	3	—		—		5	1	1	1	39	5
Corinthians	2023	Série A	22	8	9	0	0	0	11 (Note: Four appearances in Copa Libertadores, seven appearances in Copa Sudamericana)	0	—		42	8
Corinthians	2024	Série A	28	5	11	3	10	3	10	3	—		59	14
Corinthians	2025	Série A	27	0	14	4	2	0	10 (Note: Four appearances in Copa Libertadores, two appearances in Copa Sudamericana)	1	—		53	5
Corinthians	Total		77	13	34	7	12	3	31	4	—		154	27
Boca Juniors	2026	Argentine Primera División	13	3	—		2	0	5 (Note: Three appearances in Copa Libertadores, two appearances in Copa Sudamericana)	0	—		20	3
Career total			353	77	85	15	38	10	78	12	2	1	557	115

=== International ===
As of 9 September 2025

Appearances and goals by national team and year
National team	Year	Apps	Goals
Paraguay	2013	1	0
Paraguay	2014	2	1
Paraguay	2016	4	0
Paraguay	2017	5	1
Paraguay	2018	2	0
Paraguay	2019	6	0
Paraguay	2020	4	4
Paraguay	2021	14	2
Paraguay	2022	3	0
Paraguay	2024	4	0
Paraguay	2025	5	0
Total		50	8

International goals

As of match played 14 June 2021

Scores and results list Paraguay's goal tally first, score column indicates score after each Romero goal.

List of international goals scored by Ángel Romero
No.	Date	Venue	Opponent	Score	Result	Competition
1.	14 November 2014	Estadio Feliciano Cáceres, Luque, Paraguay	Peru	1–0	2–1	Friendly
2.	5 September 2017	Estadio Defensores del Chaco, Asunción, Paraguay	Uruguay	1–2	1–2	2018 FIFA World Cup qualification
3.	8 October 2020	Estadio Defensores del Chaco, Asunción, Paraguay	Peru	1–1	2–2	2022 FIFA World Cup qualification
4.	8 October 2020	Estadio Defensores del Chaco, Asunción, Paraguay	Peru	2–1	2–2	2022 FIFA World Cup qualification
5.	12 November 2020	La Bombonera, Buenos Aires, Argentina	Argentina	1–0	1–1	2022 FIFA World Cup qualification
6.	17 November 2020	Estadio Defensores del Chaco, Asunción, Paraguay	Bolivia	1–0	2–2	2022 FIFA World Cup qualification
7.	14 June 2021	Estádio Olímpico Pedro Ludovico, Goiânia, Brazil	Bolivia	2–1	3–1	2021 Copa América
8.	14 June 2021	Estádio Olímpico Pedro Ludovico, Goiânia, Brazil	Bolivia	3–1	3–1	2021 Copa América

== Honours ==
Cerro Porteño

- Primera División: 2012 Apertura, 2013 Clausura

Corinthians

- Série A: 2015, 2017
- Copa do Brasil: 2025
- Campeonato Paulista: 2017, 2018, 2025

Cruz Azul

- Supercopa de la Liga MX: 2022

Boca Juniors

- Primera División: 2026 Liga
- Copa Sudamericana: 2026
