= Luis Abram =

Peruvian footballer (born 1996)

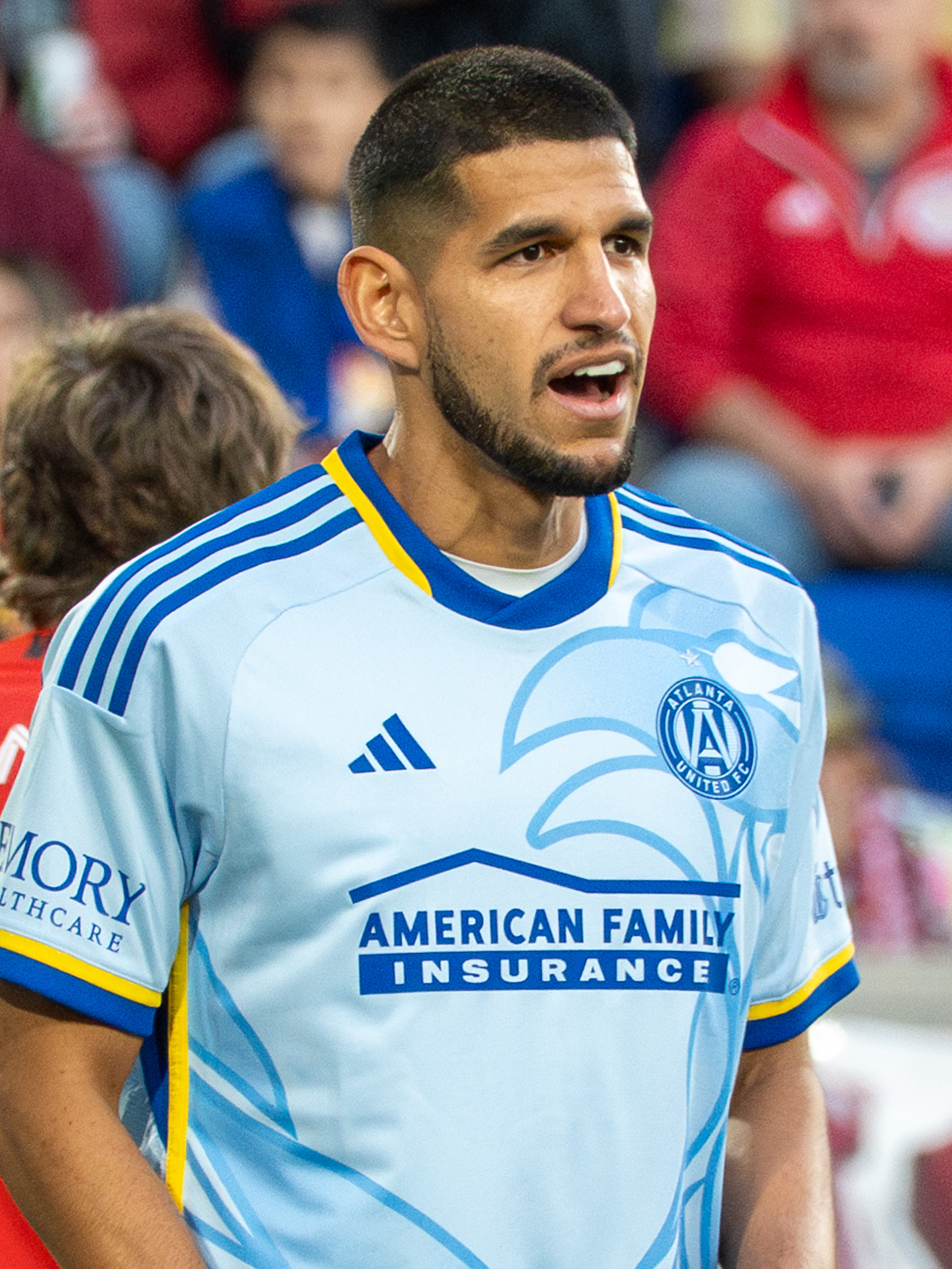
- Abram with Atlanta United in 2025

Personal information
- Full name: Luis Alfonso Abram Ugarelli
- Date of birth: 27 February 1996 (age 30)
- Place of birth: Lima, Peru
- Height: 1.81 m (5 ft 11 in)
- Position: Centre-back

Team information
- Current team: Sporting Cristal
- Number: 96

Youth career
- 2010–2012: Regatas Lima
- Sporting Cristal

Senior career*
Years	Team	Apps	(Gls)
2014–2017	Sporting Cristal	104	(3)
2018–2021	Vélez Sarsfield	70	(3)
2021–2023	Granada	8	(0)
2022	→ Cruz Azul (loan)	31	(2)
2023–2025	Atlanta United	62	(0)
2025–	Sporting Cristal	2	(1)

International career^{‡}
2013	Peru U18	4	(0)
2016	Peru U20	7	(0)
2016–	Peru	47	(1)
Medal record
Men's football
Representing Peru
Copa América
Runner-up	2019 Brazil
- * Club domestic league appearances and goals as of 3:49, 22 March 2026 (UTC) ‡ National team caps and goals as of 22:58, 15 December 2025 (UTC)

Luis Alfonso Abram Ugarelli (born 27 February 1996) is a Peruvian professional footballer who plays as a centre-back for Peruvian Primera División club Sporting Cristal and the Peru national team.

== Playing career ==
Abram was born in Lima, Peru. A Sporting Cristal youth player, he debuted in 2014 and that year won the "Newcomer of the Season Award."

On 31 July 2021, Abram joined to La Liga club Granada. On 2 February 2023, Abram joined Major League Soccer outfit Atlanta United FC

== International career ==
Born and raised in Peru, Abram was called up to the Peru U18s for the 2013 Bolivarian Games. Abram also made several appearances to the Peru U20 team. Abram debuted for the Peru national team in a 4–0 friendly win against Trinidad and Tobago in May 2016.

In May 2018, he was named in Peru's provisional 24-man squad for the 2018 World Cup in Russia, but did not make the final 23.

== Career statistics ==
=== Club ===
As of match played 23 August 2025

Appearances and goals by club, season and competition
Club	Season	League			National cup		League cup		Continental		Other		Total	
Club	Season	Division	Apps	Goals	Apps	Goals	Apps	Goals	Apps	Goals	Apps	Goals	Apps	Goals
Sporting Cristal	2014	Peruvian Primera División	21	1	1	1	—		—		—		22	2
Sporting Cristal	2015	Peruvian Primera División	10	1	6	1	—		1 (Note: Appearance(s) in Copa Libertadores)	0	—		17	2
Sporting Cristal	2016	Peruvian Primera División	34	1	0	0	—		1	0	—		35	1
Sporting Cristal	2017	Peruvian Primera División	39	0	0	0	—		5	0	—		44	0
Sporting Cristal	Total		104	3	7	2	0	0	7	0	—		118	5
Vélez Sarsfield	2017–18	Argentine Primera División	12	0	1	0	0	0	—		—		13	0
Vélez Sarsfield	2018–19	Argentine Primera División	21	2	0	0	4	0	—		—		25	2
Vélez Sarsfield	2019–20	Argentine Primera División	19	0	1	0	0	0	9 (Note: Appearance(s) in Copa Sudamericana)	1	—		29	1
Vélez Sarsfield	2020–21	Argentine Primera División	6	0	1	0	1	0	5	0	—		13	0
Vélez Sarsfield	2021	Argentine Primera División	12	1	0	0	0	0	—		—		12	1
Vélez Sarsfield	Total		70	3	3	0	5	0	14	1	—		92	4
Granada	2021–22	La Liga	8	0	2	0	—		—		—		10	0
Cruz Azul	2021–22	Liga MX	16	2	0	0	—		6 (Note: Appearance(s) in CONCACAF Champions Cup)	0	—		22	2
Cruz Azul	2022–23	Liga MX	15	0	0	0	—		—		1 (Note: Appearance in Supercopa MX)	0	16	0
Cruz Azul	Total		31	2	0	0	—		6	0	1	0	38	2
Atlanta United	2023	MLS	22	0	1	0	—		—		5 (Note: Three appearances in MLS Cup Playoffs, two appearances in Leagues Cup)	0	28	0
Atlanta United	2024	MLS	19	0	1	0	—		—		6 (Note: One appearance in Leagues Cup, five appearances in MLS Cup playoffs)	0	26	0
Atlanta United	2025	MLS	21	0	0	0	—		—		0	0	21	0
Atlanta United	Total		62	0	2	0	—		—		11	0	75	0
Sporting Cristal	2025	Peruvian Primera División	2	1	0	0	—		—		—		2	1
Career total			277	9	14	2	5	0	27	1	12	0	335	12

=== International ===
As of match played 6 June 2025

Appearances and goals by national team and year
National team	Year	Apps	Goals
Peru	2016	4	0
Peru	2018	2	0
Peru	2019	14	1
Peru	2020	4	0
Peru	2021	6	0
Peru	2022	3	0
Peru	2023	6	0
Peru	2024	5	0
Peru	2025	3	0
Total		47	1

As of goal scored on 10 September 2019

List of international goals scored by Luis Abram
No.	Date	Venue	Opponent	Score	Result	Competition	Ref.
1	10 September 2019	Los Angeles Memorial Coliseum, Los Angeles, United States	Brazil	1–0	1–0	Friendly	

== Honours ==
Sporting Cristal

- Peruvian Primera División: 2014, 2016

Cruz Azul

- Supercopa de la Liga MX: 2022
