= Alex Gutiérrez =

Mexican footballer (born 2008)

Personal information
- Full name: Alex Aiden Gutiérrez Almaguer
- Date of birth: 1 July 2008 (age 18)
- Place of birth: Oklahoma, United States
- Height: 1.87 m (6 ft 2 in)
- Position: Forward

Team information
- Current team: Cruz Azul
- Number: 163

Youth career
- –2024: Oklahoma Celtic
- 2024–2025: Necaxa
- 2025–: Cruz Azul

Senior career*
Years	Team	Apps	(Gls)
2024–2025	Necaxa	1	(0)
2025–	Cruz Azul	0	(0)

International career^{‡}
2024–	Mexico U17	2	(2)
- * Club domestic league appearances and goals as of 30 May 2026 ‡ National team caps and goals as of 30 May 2025

Alex Aiden Gutiérrez Almaguer (born 1 July 2008) is a professional footballer who plays as a forward for Liga MX club Cruz Azul. Born in the United States, he is a Mexico youth international.

== Early life ==
Gutiérrez was born on 1 July 2008. Born in Oklahoma, United States, he grew up in the state.

== Club career ==
As a youth player, Gutiérrez joined the youth academy of American side Oklahoma Celtic. Following his stint there, he signed for Mexican side Necaxa ahead of the 2024–25 season, where he made five league appearances. During the summer of 2025, he signed for Mexican side Cruz Azul.

== International career ==
Gutiérrez is a Mexico youth international. On 3 September 2025, he debuted for the Mexico national under-17 football team during a 2–3 friendly away loss to the Slovakia national under-18 football team.

== Career statistics ==
As of 30 May 2026

Appearances and goals by club, season and competition
Club	Season	League			Cup		Continental		Other		Total	
Club	Season	Division	Apps	Goals	Apps	Goals	Apps	Goals	Apps	Goals	Apps	Goals
Necaxa	2024–25	Liga MX	1	0	—		—		—		1	0
Career total			1	0	0	0	0	0	0	0	1	0

== Style of play ==
Gutiérrez plays as a forward. English newspaper The Guardian wrote in 2025 that he "drew attention with his superb left foot and his quick shot".
