= Uriel Antuna =

Mexican footballer (born 1997)

Personal information
- Full name: Carlos Uriel Antuna Romero
- Date of birth: 21 August 1997 (age 29)
- Place of birth: Gómez Palacio, Durango, Mexico
- Height: 1.74 m (5 ft 9 in)
- Position: Winger

Team information
- Current team: Pumas UNAM
- Number: 21

Youth career
- 2012–2017: Santos Laguna

Senior career*
Years	Team	Apps	(Gls)
2017	Santos Laguna	1	(0)
2017–2019	Manchester City	0	(0)
2017–2018	→ Groningen (loan)	20	(0)
2017–2018	→ Jong Groningen (loan)	19	(5)
2019	→ LA Galaxy (loan)	33	(6)
2020–2021	Guadalajara	62	(6)
2022–2024	Cruz Azul	97	(24)
2024–2026	Tigres UANL	43	(0)
2026–	Pumas UNAM	36	(3)

International career^{‡}
2017	Mexico U20	10	(5)
2018	Mexico U21	5	(0)
2021	Mexico U23	11	(4)
2017–2024	Mexico	64	(14)
Medal record
Men's football
Representing Mexico
CONCACAF Gold Cup
Winner	2023 United States–Canada	Team
Winner	2019 United States	Team
CONCACAF Nations League
Runner-up	2024 United States
Olympic Games
Bronze medal – third place	2020 Tokyo	Team
Olympic Qualifying Championship
Winner	2020 Mexico
Toulon Tournament
Runner-up	2018 France	Team
- * Club domestic league appearances and goals as of 21 November 2026 ‡ National team caps and goals as of 30 June 2024

Carlos Uriel Antuna Romero (born 21 August 1997) is a Mexican professional footballer who plays as a winger for Liga MX club Pumas UNAM.

== Club career ==
=== Early career ===
In 2012, Antuna joined the Santos Laguna youth academy, successfully going through the U-15, U-17 and U-20 teams.

In 2017, first-team manager José Manuel de la Torre promoted Antuna. On 5 March, Antuna made his professional debut in the Liga MX entering as a substitute in a 2–1 loss to Pumas.

=== FC Groningen ===
On 12 July 2017, English club Manchester City, via City Football Group, announced they had signed Antuna on a four-year contract. On 9 August, he joined Eredivisie club FC Groningen on a two-year loan deal. On 10 September, Antuna made his league debut against VVV-Venlo; he entered the match as a substitute in a 1–1 draw.

=== LA Galaxy ===
On 29 January 2019, Antuna joined MLS side LA Galaxy on loan for their 2019 season. He scored his first goal for the team in their 2–1 victory over Real Salt Lake on 28 April. In October, he extended his contract with Manchester City, keeping him through 2022. At the end of his time with LA Galaxy, he made 31 league appearances with 6 goals and 5 assists; he also received interest from Portuguese club Benfica.

=== Guadalajara ===
On 28 November 2019, Antuna joined Liga MX side Guadalajara. On 11 January 2020, he would make his debut with Guadalajara, coming on as a substitute for Isaác Brizuela in a 2–0 victory over Juárez. On 5 September, Antuna scored his first goal with Chivas against UANL in a 3–1 victory.

=== Cruz Azul ===
In early December, Guadalajara and Club América agreed to a player exchange involving Uriel Antuna and Sebastián Córdova. However, after the proposed trade did not materialize, Cruz Azul reached an agreement with Guadalajara to sign Antuna on January 4, 2022.

=== Tigres UANL ===
On 27 August 2024, Antuna joined UANL.

=== Pumas ===
On 29 January 2026, Antuna signed with Pumas.

== International career ==
=== Youth ===
Antuna was called up to the under-20 team camp in preparations for the 2017 CONCACAF U-20 Championship. He was subsequently called up for the tournament. During a classification stage match against El Salvador he would score a hat-trick, with Mexico winning the match 6–1. He was included in the best XI of the tournament. Antuna was called up for the 2017 FIFA U-20 World Cup. He would appear in all five matches until they were eliminated by England in the quarter-finals.

Antuna was included in the final roster that participated at the 2018 Toulon Tournament. He would appear in all five matches as Mexico went on to face England in the final, losing 2–1.

Antuna participated at the 2020 CONCACAF Olympic Qualifying Championship, scoring three goals in five appearances, where Mexico won the competition. He was subsequently included in the tournament's Best XI. He was subsequently called up to participate in the 2020 Summer Olympics. Antuna won the bronze medal with the Olympic team.

=== Senior ===
On 3 November 2017, Juan Carlos Osorio named Antuna to the senior national team for the friendly matches against Belgium and Poland on 10 and 13 November but did not appear in either match.

In May 2019, Antuna was included in Gerardo Martino's preliminary list for the CONCACAF Gold Cup. He made his debut on 5 June in a friendly against Venezuela, appearing as a 68th-minute substitute for Roberto Alvarado. After originally being left out of the definite list for the Gold Cup, he was included after Jorge Sánchez picked up an injury in a friendly match against Ecuador.

In Mexico's opening match against Cuba, Antuna scored a hat-trick and provided an assist in the team's 7–0 rout; his first goal at the 2nd minute of the match is the fastest goal scored by Mexico in a Gold Cup tournament. He appeared in every match as Mexico would go on to win the tournament.

On 19 November, in Mexico's final Nations League group stage match against Bermuda, Antuna scored the winning goal in injury time to secure a 2–1 win, maintaining Mexico's perfect group-stage record.

In October 2022, Antuna was named in Mexico's preliminary 31-man squad for the 2022 FIFA World Cup, and in November, he was ultimately included in the final 26-man roster.

== Style of play ==
Antuna is an agile player with sheer acceleration and speed who can dribble past opponents, with ESPN describing his work rate as "intriguing" yet "unrefined." Described as a player that likes to hold on to the ball and cross, he is fouled on often.

During a Guardianes 2020 quarter-finals match against Club América, his speed throughout the encounter was recorded as one of the fastest footballers in the world, second to Kylian Mbappe.

== Career statistics ==
=== Club ===
As of match played on 21 November 2026

Appearances and goals by club, season and competition
Club	Season	League			Cup (Note: Includes Copa MX, KNVB Cup)		Continental		Other		Total	
Club	Season	Division	Apps	Goals	Apps	Goals	Apps	Goals	Apps	Goals	Apps	Goals
Santos Laguna	2016–17	Liga MX	1	0	1	0	—		—		2	0
Groningen (loan)	2017–18	Eredivisie	11	0	1	0	—		—		12	0
Groningen (loan)	2018–19	Eredivisie	9	0	1	0	—		—		10	0
Groningen (loan)	Total		20	0	2	0	—		—		22	0
Jong Groningen (loan)	2017–18	Derde Divisie	14	3	—		—		—		14	3
Jong Groningen (loan)	2018–19	Derde Divisie	5	2	—		—		—		5	2
Jong Groningen (loan)	Total		19	5	—		—		—		19	5
LA Galaxy (loan)	2019	MLS	33 (Note: Includes two appearances in MLS Cup Playoffs)	6	—		—		1 (Note: Appearances in Leagues Cup)	0	34	6
Guadalajara	2019–20	Liga MX	9	0	2	0	—		—		11	0
Guadalajara	2020–21	Liga MX	38	6	2 (Note: Appearances in Copa GNP por México)	0	—		—		40	6
Guadalajara	2021–22	Liga MX	15	0	—		—		—		15	0
Guadalajara	Total		62	6	4	0	—		—		66	6
Cruz Azul	2021–22	Liga MX	20	2	—		5 (Note: Appearances in CONCACAF Champions League)	2	—		25	4
Cruz Azul	2022–23	Liga MX	35	8	5 (Note: Four appearances in Copa Sky por México and one appearance in Supercopa de la Liga MX)	0	—		—		40	8
Cruz Azul	2023–24	Liga MX	37	14	—		—		3	1	40	15
Cruz Azul	2024–25	Liga MX	5	0	—		—		4	1	9	1
Cruz Azul	Total		97	24	5	0	5	2	7	2	114	28
Tigres UANL	2024–25	Liga MX	29	0	—		6	1	—		35	1
Tigres UANL	2025–26	Liga MX	14	0	—		—		—		14	0
Tigres UANL	Total		43	0	—		6	1	—		49	1
Pumas UNAM	2025–26	Liga MX	20	3	—		2	0	—		22	3
Pumas UNAM	2026–27	Liga MX	16	0	—		—		3	0	19	0
Pumas UNAM	Total		36	3	—		2	0	3	0	41	3
Career total			311	44	12	0	13	3	11	2	347	49

=== International ===
As of match played on 30 June 2024

Appearances and goals by national team and year
National team	Year	Apps	Goals
Mexico	2019	12 (Note: Antuna played a match against Martinique in 2019, however, this team is not recognized by FIFA, so their matches are not statistically valid.)	7
Mexico	2020	3	1
Mexico	2021	11	0
Mexico	2022	13	2
Mexico	2023	18	4
Mexico	2024	7	0
Total		64	14

Scores and results list Mexico's goal tally first, score column indicates score after each Antuna goal.

List of international goals scored by Uriel Antuna
No.	Date	Venue	Opponent	Score	Result	Competition
1	15 June 2019	Rose Bowl, Pasadena, United States	Cuba	1–0	7–0	2019 CONCACAF Gold Cup
2	15 June 2019	Rose Bowl, Pasadena, United States	Cuba	4–0	7–0	2019 CONCACAF Gold Cup
3	15 June 2019	Rose Bowl, Pasadena, United States	Cuba	7–0	7–0	2019 CONCACAF Gold Cup
4	23 June 2019	Bank of America Stadium, Charlotte, United States	Martinique	1–0	3–2	2019 CONCACAF Gold Cup
5	6 September 2019	MetLife Stadium, East Rutherford, United States	United States	3–0	3–0	Friendly
6	11 October 2019	Bermuda National Stadium, Devonshire Parish, Bermuda	Bermuda	1–0	5–1	2019–20 CONCACAF Nations League A
7	19 November 2019	Estadio Nemesio Díez, Toluca, Mexico	Bermuda	2–1	2–1	2019–20 CONCACAF Nations League A
8	14 November 2020	Stadion Wiener Neustadt, Wiener Neustadt, Austria	South Korea	2–1	3–2	Friendly
9	30 March 2022	Estadio Azteca, Mexico City, Mexico	El Salvador	1–0	2–0	2022 FIFA World Cup qualification
10	9 November 2022	Estadi Montilivi, Girona, Spain	Iraq	4–0	4–0	Friendly
11	19 April 2023	State Farm Stadium, Glendale, United States	United States	1–0	1–1	Friendly
12	12 September 2023	Mercedes-Benz Stadium, Atlanta, United States	Uzbekistan	3–2	3–3	Friendly
13	14 October 2023	Bank of America Stadium, Charlotte, United States	Ghana	2–0	2–0	Friendly
14	17 October 2023	Lincoln Financial Field, Philadelphia, United States	Germany	1–1	2–2	Friendly

== Honours ==
Cruz Azul

- Supercopa de la Liga MX: 2022

Mexico U23

- CONCACAF Olympic Qualifying Championship: 2020
- Olympic Bronze Medal: 2020

Mexico

- CONCACAF Gold Cup: 2019, 2023

Individual

- CONCACAF U-20 Championship Best XI: 2017
- Liga MX Best XI: Guardianes 2020, Clausura 2024
- CONCACAF Olympic Qualifying Championship Best XI: 2020
- Liga MX All-Star: 2022
- Liga MX Player of the Month: March 2024
- Liga MX Golden Boot: Clausura 2024 (Shared)
