= Instalaciones La Noria =

Cruz Azul's training centre

- Interactive map of Instalaciones La Noria
- Location: Xochimilco; Mexico City
- Coordinates: 19°15′45.2″N 99°07′26.0″W
- Owner: Cruz Azul
- Type: Sports training facility
- Surface: Grass pitches (2); Synthetic turf (1)

Construction
- Built: 1986–1990
- Opened: 1990

Tenants
- Cruz Azul (1990–present); Cruz Azul Reserves and Academy (1990–present); Cruz Azul (women) (2020–present)

Instalaciones La Noria is the training ground and academy of professional football club Cruz Azul. It opened in 1990 and is located in the La Noria neighborhood of Xochimilco borough, Mexico City. La Noria has served as the home stadium and training ground of Cruz Azul's reserve and youth teams since its inception and the club's women's team since 2020.

== History ==
Its history dates back to 1986 when Cooperativa La Cruz Azul acquired a 46,600-square-meter piece of land with the goal of constructing its own facilities to replace the Seminario Menor de Acoxpa, where the team had been training while renting the property.

After four years of planning and construction, the complex was inaugurated on 10 October 1990. Since then, La Noria has been the home of Cruz Azul, becoming one of the most important high-performance centers in Latin America.

== Facilities ==
This complex is equipped with football fields, a gym, locker rooms, physiotherapy areas, and other facilities to meet the needs of players, coaching staff, and club personnel.

- 2 Grass fields (used by both first-team and youth squads).
- 1 Synthetic field.
- 1 Designated fan area.
- 1 Gymnasium.
- 1 Medical facility.
- 2 Locker-rooms.
- 1 Laundry-room.
- 1 Press area.
- Clubhouse.
- Club trophy room.
- Auditorium.
- Administrative offices.
- Kitchen.
- Dining room.
- Club souvenir shop.
- Official club store.
- Parking lot.
