= Rodrigo Huescas =

Mexican footballer (born 2003)

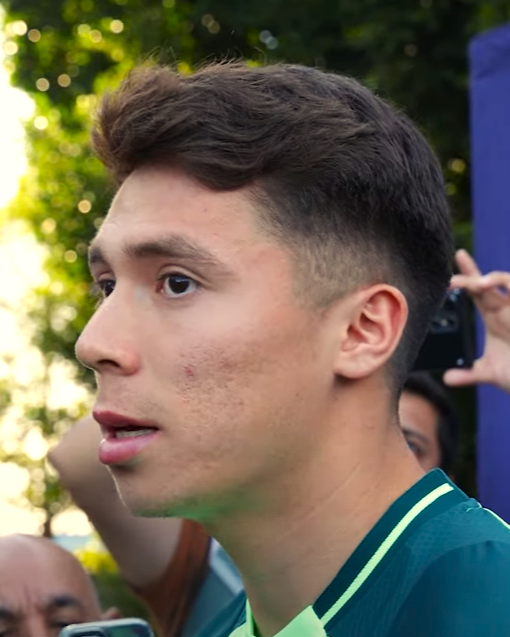
- Huescas in 2025

Personal information
- Full name: Rodrigo Jhossel Huescas Hurtado
- Date of birth: 18 September 2003 (age 23)
- Place of birth: Naucalpan, Mexico
- Height: 1.72 m (5 ft 8 in)
- Positions: Winger; right-back

Team information
- Current team: Copenhagen
- Number: 13

Youth career
- Cruz Azul

Senior career*
Years	Team	Apps	(Gls)
2021–2024	Cruz Azul	80	(6)
2024–	Copenhagen	28	(1)

International career^{‡}
2019	Mexico U16	6	(2)
2022	Mexico U20	3	(0)
2023–	Mexico U23	5	(0)
2024–	Mexico	4	(0)
Medal record
Men's football
Representing Mexico
CONCACAF Nations League
Winner	2025 United States
Central American and Caribbean Games
Gold medal – first place	2023 San Salvador	Team
- * Club domestic league appearances and goals as of 27 September 2025 ‡ National team caps and goals as of 17 November 2026

Rodrigo Jhossel Huescas Hurtado (born 18 September 2003) is a Mexican professional footballer who plays as a winger or right-back for Danish Superliga club Copenhagen and the Mexico national team.

== Club career ==
Huescas joined the Cruz Azul academy at the age of 13. He quickly established himself as a prolific scorer in the youth divisions, netting 55 goals and ranking as the academy's second leading scorer behind Santiago Giménez. He made his professional debut in April 2021 during a CONCACAF Champions League match.

In July 2024, Huescas joined F.C. Copenhagen on 5-years deal. In October 2025, he sustained a long-term injury to his right knee, which ruled him out for the remainder of the season. In October 2026, Huescas made his first competitive appearance in 12 months.

== International career ==
Huescas made his debut with the senior national team on 31 May 2024, in a friendly match against Bolivia, the match ended with Mexico taking a 1–0 win.

== Career statistics ==
=== Club ===
As of match played on 29 October 2026

Appearances and goals by club, season and competition
Club	Season	League			Cup		Continental		Other		Total	
Club	Season	Division	Apps	Goals	Apps	Goals	Apps	Goals	Apps	Goals	Apps	Goals
Cruz Azul	2020–21	Liga MX	–		–		2 (Note: Appearances in CONCACAF Champions League)	0	–		2	0
Cruz Azul	2021–22	Liga MX	9	0	–		3	0	–		12	0
Cruz Azul	2022–23	Liga MX	31	4	—		—		—		31	4
Cruz Azul	2023–24	Liga MX	39	2	—		—		1 (Note: Appearance in Leagues Cup)	0	40	2
Cruz Azul	2024–25	Liga MX	1	0	—		—		—		1	0
Cruz Azul	Total		80	6	—		5	0	1	0	86	6
Copenhagen	2024–25	Danish Superliga	18	1	6	0	11 (Note: Appearance in UEFA Conference League)	1	–		35	2
Copenhagen	2025–26	Danish Superliga	10	0	1	0	8 (Note: Appearances in UEFA Champions League)	1	0	0	19	1
Copenhagen	2026–27	Danish Superliga	0	0	1	0	2	0	—		3	0
Copenhagen	Total		28	1	8	0	21	2	0	0	57	3
Career total			108	7	8	0	26	2	1	0	143	9

=== International ===
As of match played on 17 November 2026

Appearances and goals by national team and year
National team	Year	Apps	Goals
Mexico	2024	2	0
Mexico	2025	1	0
Mexico	2026	1	0
Total		4	0

== Honours ==
Cruz Azul

- Supercopa de la Liga MX: 2022

Copenhagen

- Danish Superliga: 2024–25
- Danish Cup: 2024–25, runner-up 2025–26

Mexico Youth

- Revelations Cup: 2022
- Central American and Caribbean Games: 2023

Mexico

- CONCACAF Nations League: 2024–25

Individual

- Danish Superliga Team of the Month: July 2024
