= Iván Morales (footballer) =

Chilean footballer (born 1999)

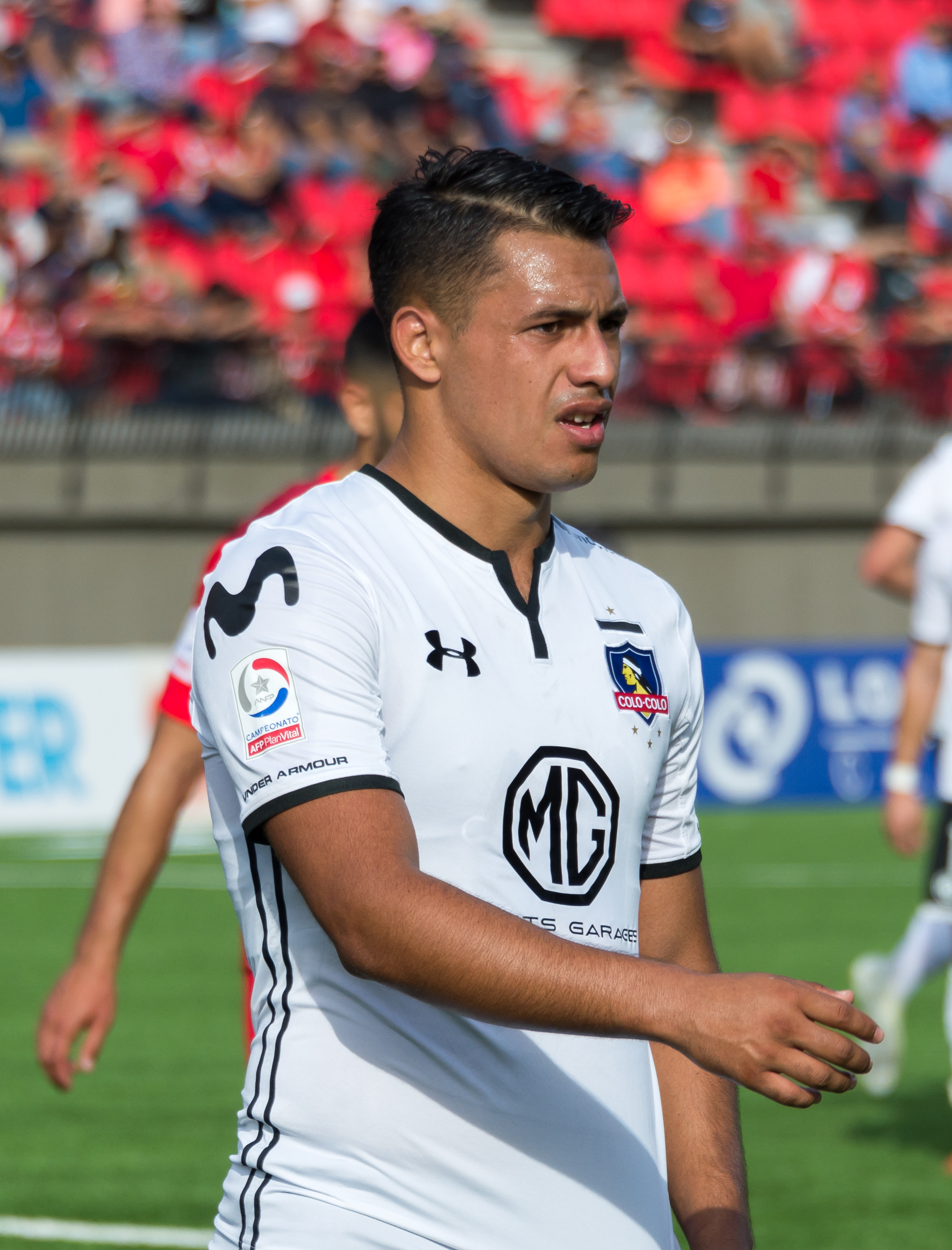
- Morales with Colo-Colo in 2019

Personal information
- Full name: Iván Andrés Morales Bravo
- Date of birth: 29 July 1999 (age 27)
- Place of birth: Longaví, Chile
- Height: 1.78 m (5 ft 10 in)
- Position: Forward

Team information
- Current team: Independiente (on loan from Argentinos Juniors)
- Number: 9

Youth career
- 2013–2016: Colo-Colo

Senior career*
Years	Team	Apps	(Gls)
2016–2022	Colo-Colo	82	(21)
2022–2024	Cruz Azul	32	(2)
2024–2026	Sarmiento Junín	60	(6)
2026–	Argentinos Juniors	17	(2)
2026–	→ Independiente (loan)	1	(0)

International career^{‡}
2017–2019	Chile U20	9	(1)
2019–	Chile	7	(1)
- * Club domestic league appearances and goals as of 16:22, 19 September 2026 (UTC) ‡ National team caps and goals as of 12:16, 28 July 2026 (UTC)

Iván Andrés Morales Bravo (born 29 July 1999) is a Chilean professional footballer who plays as a forward who plays for Argentine Primera División side Independiente, on loan from Argentinos Juniors, and the Chile national team.

== Club career ==
In 2024, Morales moved to Argentina and signed with Primera División side Sarmiento from Cruz Azul on a two-year deal.

On 10 February 2026, Morales signed a two-year contract with Argentinos Juniors. On 8 September of the same year, he joined Independiente on a loan until June 2027 with an option to extend until December.

== International career ==
He made his debut for the Chile national football team on 22 March 2019 in a friendly against Mexico, as a starter.

== Career statistics ==
=== International ===
As of match played 9 June 2026

Appearances and goals by national team and year
National team	Year	Apps	Goals
Chile	2019	1	0
Chile	2020	–	
Chile	2021	4	1
Chile	2022	–	
Chile	2023	–	
Chile	2024	–	
Chile	2025	–	
Chile	2026	2	0
Total		7	1

Scores and results list Chile's goal tally first, score column indicates score after each Morales goal.

List of international goals scored by Iván Morales
No.	Date	Venue	Opponent	Score	Result	Competition
1	8 December 2021	Q2 Stadium, Austin, United States	Mexico	1–1	2–2	Friendly

== Honours ==
Colo-Colo

- Primera División de Chile: 2017
- Copa Chile: 2016, 2019, 2021

Cruz Azul

- Supercopa de la Liga MX: 2022

Individual

- Copa Chile top goalscorer: 2021
