= 2022 Supercopa de la Liga MX =

- Match programme cover
- Event: Supercopa de la Liga MX
Atlas	Cruz Azul
2	2
- Cruz Azul won 4–3 on penalties
- Date: 26 June 2022
- Venue: Dignity Health Sports Park, Carson, United States
- Man of the Match: Ángel Romero (Cruz Azul)
- Referee: Jorge Antonio Pérez (Veracruz)
- Attendance: 22,136

The 2022 Supercopa de la Liga MX was an official Mexican football match that took place on 26 June 2022. The match was the first edition of the Supercopa de la Liga MX, contested by the 2021 Campeón de Campeones and the 2022 Campeón de Campeones. This cup featured Atlas, the 2022 champion, and Cruz Azul, the 2021 champion. The match took place at Dignity Health Sports Park in Carson, California, which hosted the previous five Campeón de Campeones. Like the Campeón de Campeones, this cup was contested at a neutral venue in the United States.

Due to Atlas winning both the Apertura 2021 and Clausura 2022, they were automatically awarded the 2022 Campeón de Campeones title. However, due to commercial commitments in Liga MX, a match must be played in the United States as the kickoff of the 2022–23 Liga MX season. On 9 June 2022, it was announced Atlas would face defending Campeón de Campeones champions Cruz Azul in a new cup called Supercopa de la Liga MX. This cup will only be played when a club is champion of both the Apertura and Clausura seasons in the same Mexican football year (e.g., Atlas).

Cruz Azul won the match 4–3 on penalties after a 2–2 draw, claiming the inaugural Supercopa de la Liga MX title.

== Match details ==
26 June 2022
18:00 PDT

Atlas	2–2	Cruz Azul
Aguilera 41'; Quiñones 90+1'	Report	Giménez 45+3'; Romero 63'
Penalties
Reyes (penalty scored); Flores (penalty missed); Rocha (penalty scored); Trejo (penalty scored); Quiñones (penalty missed)	3–4	(penalty scored) Romero; (penalty missed) Escobar; (penalty scored) Tabó; (penalty scored) Rodríguez; (penalty scored) Giménez

Dignity Health Sports Park, Carson
Attendance: 22,136
Referee: Jorge Antonio Pérez (Veracruz)

=== Details ===
Atlas	Cruz Azul

GK	12	(Colombia) Camilo Vargas
DF	5	(Peru) Anderson Santamaría	(yellow card) 28'
DF	2	(Argentina) Hugo Nervo	(yellow card) 23'
DF	29	(Argentina) Emanuel Aguilera		(substituted off) 78'
MF	4	(Mexico) José Abella
MF	14	(Mexico) Luis Reyes
MF	26	(Mexico) Aldo Rocha (c)
MF	15	(Mexico) Diego Barbosa		(substituted off) 62'
MF	6	(Mexico) Édgar Zaldívar		(substituted off) 71'
FW	7	(Mexico) Jonathan Herrera
FW	33	(Colombia) Julián Quiñones	(yellow card) 90+3'
Substitutions:
GK	1	(Mexico) José Hernández
DF	3	(Mexico) Idekel Domínguez
DF	13	(Mexico) Gaddi Aguirre
DF	23	(Mexico) Alejandro Gómez
MF	10	(Peru) Edison Flores	(yellow card) 90+5'	(substituted on) 62'
MF	18	(Mexico) Jeremy Márquez		(substituted on) 71'
MF	19	(Mexico) Edyairth Ortega
MF	32	(Uruguay) Lucas Rodríguez
FW	9	(Argentina) Julio Furch
FW	28	(Mexico) Christopher Trejo		(substituted on) 78'
Manager:
(Argentina) Diego Cocca

GK	33	(Mexico) Sebastián Jurado
DF	24	(Paraguay) Juan Escobar	(yellow card) 79'
DF	4	(Mexico) Julio César Domínguez (c)
DF	5	(Peru) Luis Abram	(yellow card) 55'
DF	2	(Mexico) Alejandro Mayorga
MF	7	(Mexico) Uriel Antuna		(substituted off) 36'
MF	6	(Mexico) Érik Lira
MF	15	(Uruguay) Ignacio Rivero		(substituted off) 46'
MF	10	(Paraguay) Ángel Romero
MF	11	(Uruguay) Christian Tabó
FW	9	(Mexico) Santiago Giménez	(yellow card) 44'
Substitutions:
GK	1	(Mexico) José de Jesús Corona
GK	30	(Mexico) Andrés Gudiño
DF	3	(Mexico) Jaiber Jiménez
DF	12	(Mexico) José Joaquín Martínez
DF	183	(Mexico) Rafael Guerrero
DF	200	(Mexico) Jorge García
MF	18	(Mexico) Rodrigo Huescas
MF	19	(Mexico) Carlos Rodríguez		(substituted on) 46'
MF	22	(Mexico) Rafael Baca		(substituted on) 36'
FW	20	(Chile) Iván Morales
Manager:
(Uruguay) Diego Aguirre

Assistant referees:
Karen Janet Díaz (Aguascalientes)
Jorge Antonio Sánchez (State of México)
Fourth official:
Ismael Rosario López (Sinaloa)
Video assistant referee:
Erick Yair Miranda (Guanajuato)
Assistant video assistant referee:
Jorge Abraham Camacho (Jalisco)

== See also ==
- Campeón de Campeones
- Supercopa MX
