= Gonzalo Carneiro =

Uruguayan footballer (born 1995)

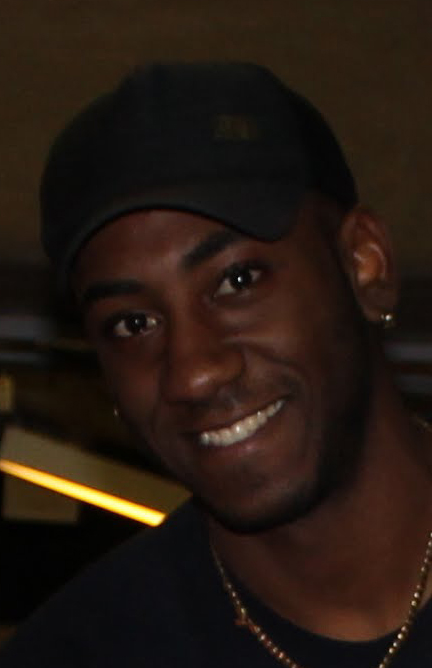
- Carneiro in 2018

Personal information
- Full name: Gonzalo Rodrigo Carneiro Méndez
- Date of birth: 12 September 1995 (age 31)
- Place of birth: Montevideo, Uruguay
- Height: 1.94 m (6 ft 4 in)
- Position: Forward

Team information
- Current team: Nacional
- Number: 20

Youth career
- 2009–2015: Defensor Sporting

Senior career*
Years	Team	Apps	(Gls)
2015–2018	Defensor Sporting	38	(13)
2018–2021	São Paulo	32	(2)
2021–2023	Sion	0	(0)
2022	→ Liverpool Montevideo (loan)	16	(5)
2022–2023	→ Cruz Azul (loan)	24	(4)
2023–	Nacional	34	(10)
- * Club domestic league appearances and goals as of 1 October 2025

Gonzalo Rodrigo Carneiro Méndez (born 12 September 1995) is a Uruguayan professional footballer who plays as a forward for Nacional.

== Career ==
Carneiro started his professional career at Uruguayan club Defensor Sporting, making his debut in November 2015 and going on to make 39 league appearances for the club, scoring 13 goals.

On 2 April 2018, Carneiro joined Brazilian club São Paulo FC on a three-year contract.

On 16 July 2023, Carneiro signed with Nacional.

== Personal life ==
Carneiro is the nephew of former Uruguay international Marcelo Zalayeta.

== Honours ==
Defensor Sporting

- Uruguayan Primera División Apertura winner: 2017
