= Cruz Azul Reserves and Academy =

Cruz Azul's reserve and academy football team

Cruz Azul Academy
- Full name: Club de Futbol Cruz Azul S.A. de C.V.
- Nicknames: La Máquina (The Machine); Los Celestes (The Sky Blues); Los Cementeros (The Cement Workers); Las Liebres (The Hares); Los de La Noria (Those from La Noria)
- Founded: 10 October 1990; 36 years ago
- Ground: Instalaciones La Noria
- Capacity: 2,000
- Owner: Cooperativa La Cruz Azul
- President: Víctor Velázquez
- Manager: Marco Calvillo (U21); Diego Rosales (U19); Manuel Romero (U19 Women); Gabriel Gómez (U17); Ricardo Jiménez (U15)
- League: Liga MX Youth League; Liga Femenil Youth League
- Website: cfcruzazul.com

Cruz Azul Reserves represents the youth development and reserve team system of Cruz Azul. Historically, these teams have provided a critical platform for players transitioning to professional football, competing across various levels of the Mexican football pyramid. The currently active reserve teams are Cruz Azul Hidalgo and Cruz Azul Lagunas, which compete in the Liga de Expansión MX and the Liga Premier (Premier B), respectively. Former reserve teams, such as Cruz Azul Oaxaca, Cruz Azul Jasso, and Cruz Azul Premier, competed in various lower divisions before being disbanded.

Cruz Azul Academy is the youth training system of the club, nurturing players from the U11 level to the U21 squad. On the women's side, the academy currently operates only an Under-19 team, in accordance with the current structure of Liga Femenil's youth system, which has progressively evolved from U-17 and U-18 categories to the present U-19 format. The academy focuses on skill development, tactical training, and mental preparation for professional football. Emmanuel González serves as the Academy Director, overseeing all age groups and ensuring alignment with the club's philosophy.

Since its formation, the academy has achieved notable success, including winning the U15 league championship during the Apertura 2018 tournament. Several players have graduated from the academy to become prominent figures in Mexican football, including Fernando Bustos, Ignacio Flores, Octavio Muciño, Luis Hernández, Óscar Pérez, Francisco Palencia, Ricardo Osorio, Santiago Giménez, and Rodrigo Huescas, among others.

== Reserve teams ==
=== Cruz Azul Hidalgo ===
Cruz Azul Hidalgo was established in 1930 as one of the most prominent reserve teams, which competed in the Primera División "A" from 1992 to 2003 and again from 2006 to 2014. The team was based in Ciudad Cooperativa Cruz Azul but briefly relocated to Oaxaca, adopting the name Cruz Azul Oaxaca. Cruz Azul Hidalgo encountered challenges in the Ascenso MX during the 2012–13 season due to its low performance but managed to avoid relegation by securing its position, ensuring its continuity in the league. On 15 May 2014, the club's board finalized the sale of Cruz Azul Hidalgo, which became the new Zacatepec team for the Apertura 2014 tournament. Following the dissolution of Cruz Azul Hidalgo in its original form, Cruz Azul Jasso from the Segunda División was renamed Cruz Azul Hidalgo. This restructured team continued to exist and competed in the Liga Premier de Ascenso of the Segunda División, preserving the legacy of the original club until its operations were temporarily suspended in 2021. Following a five-year hiatus, the club was officially reestablished in April 2026 to compete in the Liga de Expansión MX starting with the 2026–27 season, marking its return to the second tier of Mexican professional football.

=== Cruz Azul Oaxaca ===
Cruz Azul Oaxaca functioned as a reserve team from 2003 to 2006. At the end of the Verano 2003 tournament, the club's management decided to relocate Cruz Azul Hidalgo to Oaxaca, adopting the name Cruz Azul Oaxaca. The team played its home matches at the Estadio Benito Juárez. During its three-year tenure in Primera División "A", Cruz Azul Oaxaca achieved its best result in the Apertura 2005 tournament, where it reached the final but lost to Puebla, narrowly missing promotion to the Primera División. Following the Clausura 2006 tournament, the franchise returned to Hidalgo and resumed its previous name, Cruz Azul Hidalgo, in the Apertura 2006.

=== Cruz Azul Jasso ===
Cruz Azul Jasso played in the Segunda División from 2006 to 2015. Cruz Azul Jasso began participating in the Apertura 2006 tournament in the Segunda División Zona Bajío under the name Cruz Azul Hidalgo. Its name was later changed to Cruz Azul Jasso due to the relocation of the now-defunct Cruz Azul Oaxaca back to Hidalgo, which adopted the Cruz Azul Hidalgo name. Cruz Azul Jasso achieved significant success, becoming champions of the Segunda División in the Clausura 2007 tournament. By the Apertura 2014 tournament, the club reverted to the Cruz Azul Hidalgo name following the sale of the Ascenso MX franchise to Zacatepec. Meanwhile, Cruz Azul Dublán, another reserve team, of the Tercera División adopted the name Cruz Azul Jasso, ensuring the club's continuity in the Tercera División. However, it lasted only one season before transforming into Cruz Azul Premier, which rejoined the Segunda División.

=== Cruz Azul Premier ===
Cruz Azul Premier participated in the Segunda División/Liga Premier from 2015 to 2018. Cruz Azul Premier began participating in the Liga Premier de Ascenso as the official reserve team of Cruz Azul, without the right to promotion. This team was entirely separate from Cruz Azul Hidalgo. In 2015, the league made it mandatory for all Liga MX clubs to have a reserve team in the Liga Premier to keep players who exceeded the age limit for the U20 active, as well as those who had not yet consolidated in the first team. This led to the establishment of Cruz Azul Premier by the club. However, in 2018, this requirement was abolished, and the club decided to withdraw Cruz Azul Premier from the competition.

=== Cruz Azul Lagunas ===
Cruz Azul Lagunas currently competes in the Premier B—the bottom branch of the Liga Premier de México—as an active reserve team of Cruz Azul. The team transitioned from competing in the Segunda División to its current position in the Tercera División as part of a restructuring process. Cruz Azul Lagunas plays its home matches at the Deportivo La Laguna, located in the city of Lagunas, Oaxaca. The team continues to provide development opportunities for young talents and acts as a feeder team for the senior squad, ensuring the continuity of Cruz Azul's legacy in player development.

== The Academy ==
=== Facilities ===
==== Instalaciones La Noria Sports Complex ====
The complex for the Cruz Azul academy, Instalaciones La Noria is the club's high-performance center and main headquarters, located in the La Noria neighborhood in the Xochimilco borough of Mexico City. Its history dates back to 1986 when Cooperativa La Cruz Azul acquired a 46,600-square-meter piece of land with the goal of constructing its own facilities to replace the Seminario Menor de Acoxpa, where the team had been training while renting the property.

After four years of planning and construction, the complex was inaugurated on 10 October 1990. Since then, La Noria has been the home of Cruz Azul, becoming one of the most important high-performance centers in Latin America.

The complex was designed with an ecological focus and includes various facilities aimed at the comprehensive development of players, such as 3 professional football fields (two with natural grass and one with synthetic turf), locker rooms, gymnasium, kitchen, clubhouse, auditorium, and other facilities.

==== Seminario Menor de Acoxpa ====
The Seminario Menor de Acoxpa complex served as the primary training facility for Cruz Azul for nine years before the inauguration of the La Noria complex in 1990. Located in the Acoxpa area of Mexico City, these facilities were utilized by the club's first team and youth divisions. After transitioning to La Noria, Cruz Azul continued to use the Seminario Menor de Acoxpa for various activities, including youth team tryouts and training sessions. For instance, in December 2022, official tryouts for the Under-15 and Under-13 categories were held at these facilities. Similarly, in August 2023, tryouts for the Under-11 and Under-12 categories took place at the same venue.

== Academy squads ==
=== Under-21s ===
As of 13 September 2026

Players listed in bold have made at least one senior first-team appearance.

Note: Flags indicate national team as defined under FIFA eligibility rules; some limited exceptions apply. Players may hold more than one non-FIFA nationality.

No.	Pos.	Nation	Player
181	GK	MEX	Roberto Moreno
182	GK	MEX	Santiago Coutiño
183	MF	MEX	Kelvin Palacios
185	MF	MEX	Cristopher Benítez
186	DF	MEX	Rogelio Esparza
187	DF	MEX	Cristian Vázquez
189	DF	MEX	José Mendoza
191	MF	MEX	Alejandro González
192	MF	MEX	Nicolás Ramírez
193	DF	MEX	Marcio Araujo
194	MF	MEX	**Amaury Morales**
195	MF	MEX	Glenn Avila
196	MF	MEX	Ian Ramírez
197	FW	MEX	Humberto Montañez
198	DF	MEX	Luiszael Gómez
199	DF	MEX	Zadiel Pineda

No.	Pos.	Nation	Player
200	DF	MEX	David Herrera
201	MF	MEX	Orlando Ramírez
202	FW	MEX	Alex Gutiérrez
203	DF	MEX	Xandor Camacho
204	FW	MEX	Jonathan Meza
205	FW	MEX	Jonathan Vazquez
206	DF	MEX	Joshua Ortega
207	MF	MEX	Pedro Sauceda
208	MF	MEX	Santiago Vargas
213	MF	MEX	**Jeyson Durán** (captain)
214	FW	MEX	**Mateo Levy**
219	FW	MEX	Íñigo Cuesta
221	DF	ARG	Benjamin Oreja
222	DF	MEX	Eric Villegas
223	DF	MEX	Juan Tejeda
224	MF	MEX	Santiago Rosales

=== Under-19s ===
As of 13 September 2026

These players can also play with the Under-21s and the senior squad. Players listed in bold have made at least one senior first-team appearance.

Note: Flags indicate national team as defined under FIFA eligibility rules; some limited exceptions apply. Players may hold more than one non-FIFA nationality.

No.	Pos.	Nation	Player
231	GK	MEX	Ramiro Rojas
232	GK	MEX	Kevin Barrón
233	GK	MEX	Omar Perez
234	GK	MEX	Matias Del Moral
235	MF	MEX	Luis Alvarado
236	FW	MEX	Jesús Perafán
237	DF	MEX	Marco Cervantes
238	DF	MEX	Abel Ruiz
239	MF	MEX	Michael Del Vecchio
240	DF	MEX	Patricio Rasgado
241	MF	MEX	César Villaluz (captain)
242	FW	MEX	Giovani Mendoza
243	MF	MEX	Rubén Uscanga
244	DF	MEX	Oscar Piña
245	DF	MEX	Víctor Márquez
246	MF	MEX	Rey Martínez

No.	Pos.	Nation	Player
247	DF	MEX	Santiago López
248	MF	MEX	Ernesto López
249	MF	MEX	Emmanuel Trejo
250	MF	MEX	Diego Ocampo
251	FW	MEX	Francisco Araujo
252	DF	MEX	Diego Santos
253	MF	MEX	Pablo Sánchez
254	MF	MEX	Derek Flores
255	FW	MEX	Eder Aldana
256	DF	MEX	Fernando Ruiz
257	MF	MEX	Diego Morales
258	FW	MEX	**Emiliano Castañeda**
259	MF	MEX	Leopoldo Garcia
260	DF	MEX	Raúl Torres
261	DF	MEX	Paulo Sánchez
262	MF	MEX	José Nares

=== Under-17s ===
As of 13 September 2026

These players can also play with the Under-21s, Under-19s and the senior squad.

Note: Flags indicate national team as defined under FIFA eligibility rules; some limited exceptions apply. Players may hold more than one non-FIFA nationality.

No.	Pos.	Nation	Player
282	GK	MEX	Saul Torres
283	GK	MEX	Jesús Puebla
284	GK	MEX	Miguel Hernández
285	DF	MEX	José Sánchez
286	DF	MEX	Mauricio Ramírez
287	DF	MEX	Ian Flores
288	DF	MEX	Alberto Méndez
289	DF	MEX	Alfredo López
290	DF	MEX	Roberto Ibarra
291	MF	MEX	Yadier Alvarado
295	DF	MEX	Diego Cabañas (captain)
296	DF	MEX	Eduardo Castillo
297	FW	MEX	Edgar Diez Marina
298	DF	MEX	Ricardo Chávez
299	MF	MEX	Maximiliano García
300	DF	MEX	Marco Sánchez
301	DF	MEX	José Soto
302	MF	MEX	Dustyn Sosa

No.	Pos.	Nation	Player
303	DF	MEX	Carlos Nuncio
304	MF	MEX	Diego Quintana
305	MF	MEX	Eiden Chávez
307	FW	MEX	Santiago López
309	MF	MEX	Dante Cruz
310	FW	MEX	Yosgar Mayen
311	MF	MEX	Jaime López
312	MF	MEX	Dilan Salinas
313	FW	MEX	Ian Reyes (vice-captain)
314	MF	MEX	Santiago Madrid
316	MF	MEX	Diego Díaz
317	FW	MEX	Juan Vélez
318	MF	MEX	Arturo Guillermo
319	MF	MEX	Angel Fierro
320	DF	MEX	Luis Ramírez
321	GK	MEX	Daniel Aguirre
322	MF	MEX	Jorge Torres

=== Under-15s ===
As of 13 September 2026

These players can also play with the Under-21s, Under-19s, Under-17s and the senior squad.

Note: Flags indicate national team as defined under FIFA eligibility rules; some limited exceptions apply. Players may hold more than one non-FIFA nationality.

No.	Pos.	Nation	Player
332	GK	MEX	Santiago Cisneros
333	GK	MEX	Ricardo Ramírez
334	GK	MEX	Lorenzo Orozco
335	GK	MEX	Matías Gutiérrez
337	DF	MEX	Mateo Chávez
338	DF	MEX	Matías Domínguez
339	DF	MEX	Luis Benítez
341	MF	MEX	Miguel Domínguez
342	MF	MEX	Iker Guadarrama
343	MF	MEX	Edgar Peña
344	MF	MEX	Oscar Delgado (captain)
345	MF	MEX	Santiago Javier
346	MF	MEX	Paul Aja
347	MF	MEX	Alberto Vázquez
348	MF	MEX	Diego Tovar

No.	Pos.	Nation	Player
349	DF	MEX	Leonel Meraz
350	DF	MEX	Yael Benítez
351	DF	MEX	Hiram Hernández
352	FW	MEX	Axel Vega
354	FW	MEX	Ángel Moya
355	MF	MEX	Patricio Valdés
356	DF	MEX	Aarón Vadillo
357	DF	MEX	Iker Pierdant
358	DF	MEX	Rodrigo Rosales
364	FW	MEX	Diego Gutiérrez
365	FW	MEX	Jonathan Castillo
366	MF	MEX	Christian Suárez
367	MF	MEX	Derek Castañeda
368	DF	MEX	Martín Rodríguez
369	DF	MEX	Ethan Esparza

== Women's Academy ==
=== Under-19s ===
As of 13 September 2026

Players listed in bold have made at least one senior first-team appearance.

Note: Flags indicate national team as defined under FIFA eligibility rules; some limited exceptions apply. Players may hold more than one non-FIFA nationality.

No.	Pos.	Nation	Player
42	GK	MEX	Rohami Ochoa
43	FW	MEX	Ángela Alvarado
44	MF	MEX	Ty Burks
45	DF	MEX	Corina Gómez
46	DF	MEX	Sophia Domínguez
48	MF	MEX	Sofia López
49	DF	MEX	Hannah Hernández (captain)
50	FW	MEX	Mia Tomás
52	MF	MEX	Valeria Suárez
53	MF	MEX	Valentina Azmitia
55	DF	MEX	Angelique Segura
56	DF	MEX	Alison Mejía

No.	Pos.	Nation	Player
57	MF	MEX	Lindsay Sánchez
58	MF	MEX	**Mariana Oropeza** (vice-captain)
59	MF	MEX	Kimberly Rodríguez
61	MF	MEX	Hanny Herrera
62	GK	MEX	Sara Toledano
68	DF	MEX	Sofia San Román
69	MF	MEX	**Renata Rueda**
70	DF	MEX	Izabella Acosta
72	FW	MEX	Zoe Mendoza
73	DF	MEX	Jennyfer Alva
74	GK	MEX	Valeria Pérez
75	DF	MEX	Valeria Gutiérrez

== Current staff ==
=== Managers ===
Position	Staff
Director of academy	(Mexico) Emmanuel González
U21 Manager	(Mexico) Marco Calvillo
U19 Manager	(Mexico) Diego Rosales
U19 Women's Manager	(Mexico) Manuel Romero
U17 Manager	(Mexico) Gabriel Gómez
U15 Manager	(Mexico) Ricardo Jiménez

=== Staff ===
Position	Staff
U21 Assistant managers	(Mexico) Julio César Domínguez
U21 Assistant managers	(Mexico) Manuel Valdés
U21 Fitness coach	(Mexico) Carlos Rojas
U21 Team doctors	(Mexico) Daniel De La Cruz
U21 Team doctors	(Mexico) Ramsés Quinto
U21 Utility worker	(Mexico) Rodolfo Alcántara
U19 Assistant manager	(Mexico) Dante Delgadillo
U19 Fitness coach	(Mexico) Germán García
U19 Team doctor	(Mexico) Yurik Romero
U19 Utility worker	(Mexico) Hugo Ruiz
U19 Women's Assistant managers	(Mexico) Laura Chávez
U19 Women's Assistant managers	(Mexico) Marissa Lupercio
U19 Women's Fitness coach	(Mexico) Laura Maravillas
U19 Women's Team doctor	(Mexico) Sulamith Victorio
U19 Women's Physiotherapists	(Mexico) Xitlali Bravo
U19 Women's Physiotherapists	(Mexico) Miranda Uriarte
U19 Women's Utility workers	(Mexico) María Lezama
U19 Women's Utility workers	(Mexico) Valeria Lagunes
U17 Assistant manager	Vacant
U17 Fitness coach	(Mexico) Humberto Villegas
U17 Team doctor	(Mexico) Carlos Olguín
U17 Utility worker	Vacant
U15 Assistant manager	(Mexico) Yael Cortez
U15 Fitness coach	(Mexico) Hugo Durán
U15 Team doctor	(Mexico) Mónica Torres
U15 Utility worker	Vacant

== Honours ==
Cruz Azul Reserves and Academy honours
Type	Competition	Titles	Seasons
Domestic	Liga MX Under-15	1	Apertura 2018
Domestic	Segunda División	2	1994–95, Clausura 2007
Domestic	Copa de la Segunda División	1	Apertura 2013
Domestic	Campeón de Campeones de la Liga Premier de Ascenso	1	Clausura 2014
