= Clausura 2024 Liga MX final phase =

Tournament details
- Dates: 2 May – 26 May 2024
- Teams: 10

Tournament statistics
- Matches played: 17
- Goals scored: 29 (1.71 per match)
- Attendance: 633,159 (37,245 per match)

The Clausura 2024 Liga MX final phase was played between 2 May 2024 and 26 May 2024. A total of ten teams competed in the final phase to decide the champions of the Clausura 2024 Liga MX season.

For the second straight season, the number of clubs qualifying for the quarter-finals will be six while the teams qualifying for the reclassification is four. The four clubs qualified for the reclassification competed in the "play-in" round, a tournament modeled after the NBA play-in tournament.

América defeated Cruz Azul 2–1 on aggregate to win their second straight title and fifteenth overall. As winners of both the Apertura 2023 and Clausura 2024 seasons, América were automatically awarded the 2024 Campeón de Campeones.

== Qualified teams ==
The following teams qualified for the championship stage.

In the following tables, the number of appearances, last appearance, and previous best result count only those in the short tournament era starting from Invierno 1996 (not counting those in the long tournament era from 1943–44 to 1995–96).

Qualified directly to quarter-finals (6 teams)
Seed	Team	Points (GD)	Date of qualification	Appearance	Last appearance	Previous best (last)	Ref.
1	América	35	6 April 2024 (PLAY); 13 April 2024 (QF)	40th	Apertura 2023	Champions (Ap. 2023)	
2	Cruz Azul	33	12 April 2024 (PLAY); 27 April 2024 (QF)	35th	Clausura 2023	Champions (Gua. 2021)	
3	Toluca	32 (+15)	7 April 2024 (PLAY); 19 April 2024 (QF)	38th	Clausura 2023	Champions (Bic. 2010)	
4	Monterrey	32 (+13)	6 April 2024 (PLAY); 28 April 2024 (QF)	30th	Apertura 2023	Champions (Ap. 2019)	
5	UANL	31 (+11)	20 April 2024 (PLAY); 27 April 2024 (QF)	33rd	Apertura 2023	Champions (Cl. 2023)	
6	Guadalajara	31 (+7)	20 April 2024 (PLAY); 27 April 2024 (QF)	32nd	Apertura 2023	Champions (Cl. 2017)	

Qualified to the play-in round (4 teams)
Seed	Team	Points (GD)	Date of qualification	Appearance	Last appearance	Previous best (last)	Ref.
7	Pachuca	29	20 April 2024	40th	Clausura 2023	Champions (Ap. 2022)	
8	UNAM	27 (+5)	26 April 2024	27th	Apertura 2023	Champions (Cl. 2011)	
9	Necaxa	27 (+1)	12 April 2024	21st	Apertura 2022	Champions (Inv. 1998)	
10	Querétaro	24	27 April 2024	6th	Guardianes 2021	Runners-up (Cl. 2015)	

== Play-in round ==
=== Format ===
The 9th place team hosts the 10th place team in an elimination game. The 7th hosts the 8th place team in the double-chance game, with the winner advancing as the 7-seed. The loser of this game then hosts the winner of the elimination game between the 9th and 10th place teams to determine the 8-seed.

=== Bracket ===
Play-in games
Serie A
7	Pachuca	0 (3)
8	UNAM (p)	0 (5)
Serie B
9	Necaxa (p)	1 (3)
10	Querétaro	1 (2)

No. 8 seed game
7	Pachuca	2
9	Necaxa	1

Final seeds
8	UNAM	No. 7 seed
7	Pachuca	No. 8 seed

=== Play-in matches ===
Team 1	Score	Team 2
Pachuca	0–0 (3–5 p)	UNAM
Necaxa	1–1 (3–2 p)	Querétaro

==== Serie A ====
2 May 2024
21:15 CST (UTC−6)

Pachuca	0–0	UNAM
	Report
Penalties
Rondón (penalty scored); Hernández (penalty missed); Bautista (penalty scored); Idrissi (penalty scored)	3–5	(penalty scored) Martínez; (penalty scored) Aldrete; (penalty scored) Huerta; (penalty scored) Rivas; (penalty scored) Ergas

Estadio Hidalgo, Pachuca
Attendance: 12,168
Referee: Adonai Escobedo González (Aguascalientes)

==== Serie B ====
2 May 2024
19:00 CST (UTC−6)

Necaxa	1–1	Querétaro
Cambindo 56'	Report	Lértora 59'
Penalties
Peña (penalty scored); Paradela (penalty scored); Oliveros (penalty scored); Montes (penalty missed)	3–2	(penalty missed) Barbieri; (penalty scored) Escamilla; (penalty scored) Sierra; (penalty missed) Lértora; (penalty missed) Barrera

Estadio Victoria, Aguascalientes
Attendance: 13,435
Referee: Daniel Quintero Huitrón (Jalisco)

=== No. 8 seed match ===
Team 1	Score	Team 2
Pachuca	2–1	Necaxa

5 May 2024
20:06 CST (UTC−6)

Pachuca	2–1	Necaxa
Bautista 79'; Rondón 83' (pen.)	Report	Garnica 90+6'

Estadio Hidalgo, Pachuca
Attendance: 20,102
Referee: Fernando Hernández Gómez (Mexico City)

== Final seeding ==
The following is the final seeding for the final phase after the play-in round matches

Seed	Team
1	América
2	Cruz Azul
3	Toluca
4	Monterrey
5	UANL
6	Guadalajara
7	UNAM
8	Pachuca

== Bracket ==
Quarter-finals
1	América (s)	1	1	2
8	Pachuca	1	1	2
3	Toluca	0	0	0
6	Guadalajara	1	0	1
2	Cruz Azul	2	2	4
7	UNAM	0	2	2
4	Monterrey	2	1	3
5	UANL	1	1	2

Semi-finals
1	América	0	1	1
6	Guadalajara	0	0	0
2	Cruz Azul (s)	1	1	2
4	Monterrey	0	2	2

Finals
1	América	1	1	2
2	Cruz Azul	1	0	1

== Quarter-finals ==
=== Summary ===
The first legs will be played on 8–9 May 2024, and the second legs will be played on 11–12 May 2024.

Team 1	Agg.	Team 2	1st leg	2nd leg
Pachuca	2–2	América (s)	1–1	1–1
UNAM	2–4	Cruz Azul	0–2	2–2
Guadalajara	1–0	Toluca	1–0	0–0
UANL	2–3	Monterrey	1–2	1–1

=== Matches ===
8 May 2024
21:16 CST (UTC−6)

Pachuca	1–1	América
Rondón 21'	Report	Martín 45+1'

Estadio Hidalgo, Pachuca
Attendance: 18,043
Referee: Fernando Guerrero (Mexico City)
11 May 2024
18:00 CST (UTC−6)

América	1–1	Pachuca
Quiñones 90+4'	Report	Idrissi 31'

Estadio Azteca, Mexico City
Attendance: 46,570
Referee: Víctor Alfonso Cáceres (Chiapas)

2–2 on aggregate. América advanced due to being the higher seeded team.

9 May 2024
19:00 CST (UTC−6)

UNAM	0–2	Cruz Azul
	Report	Rivero 26'; Faravelli 57'

Estadio Olímpico Universitario, Mexico City
Attendance: 40,418
Referee: Luis Enrique Santander (Guanajuato)
12 May 2024
19:00 CST (UTC−6)

Cruz Azul	2–2	UNAM
Gutiérrez 76'; Faravelli 90+1'	Report	Martínez 51'; Huerta 85'

Estadio Ciudad de los Deportes, Mexico City
Attendance: 27,228
Referee: Daniel Quintero Huitrón (Jalisco)

Cruz Azul won 4–2 on aggregate.

8 May 2024
19:05 CST (UTC−6)

Guadalajara	1–0	Toluca
Guzmán 86'	Report

Estadio Akron, Zapopan
Attendance: 40,458
Referee: Oscar Mejía García (Mexico City)
11 May 2024
20:10 CST (UTC−6)

Toluca	0–0	Guadalajara
	Report

Estadio Nemesio Díez, Toluca
Attendance: 27,273
Referee: César Arturo Ramos (Sinaloa)

Guadalajara won 1–0 on aggregate.

9 May 2024
21:10 CST (UTC−6)

UANL	1–2	Monterrey
Lainez 45+3'	Report	Canales 28'; Meza 48'

Estadio Universitario, San Nicolás de los Garza
Attendance: 41,615
Referee: Marco Antonio Ortiz (Durango)
12 May 2024
21:10 CST (UTC−6)

Monterrey	1–1	UANL
Cortizo 59'	Report	Gignac 26'

Estadio BBVA, Guadalupe
Attendance: 51,095
Referee: Fernando Hernández Gómez (Mexico City)

Monterrey won 3–2 on aggregate.

== Semi-finals ==
=== Summary ===
The first legs will be played on 15–16 May 2024, and the second legs will be played on 18–19 May 2024.

Team 1	Agg.	Team 2	1st leg	2nd leg
Guadalajara	0–1	América	0–0	0–1
Monterrey	2–2 (s)	Cruz Azul	0–1	2–1

15 May 2024
20:05 CST (UTC−6)

Guadalajara	0–0	América
	Report

Estadio Akron, Zapopan
Attendance: 43,628
Referee: Óscar Mejía García (Mexico City)
18 May 2024
20:00 CST (UTC−6)

América	1–0	Guadalajara
I. Reyes 60'	Report

Estadio Azteca, Mexico City
Attendance: 70,187
Referee: César Arturo Ramos (Sinaloa)

América won 1–0 on aggregate.

16 May 2024
21:00 CST (UTC−6)

Monterrey	0–1	Cruz Azul
	Report	Rotondi 34'

Estadio BBVA, Guadalupe
Attendance: 51,708
Referee: Daniel Quintero Huitrón (Jalisco)
19 May 2024
18:00 CST (UTC−6)

Cruz Azul	1–2	Monterrey
Sepúlveda 61'	Report	Berterame 67', 73'

Estadio Ciudad de los Deportes, Mexico City
Attendance: 28,403
Referee: Fernando Guerrero (Mexico City)

2–2 on aggregate. Cruz Azul advanced due to being the higher seeded team.

== Finals ==
=== Summary ===
The first leg was played on 23 May 2024, and the second leg was played on 26 May 2024.

Team 1	Agg.	Team 2	1st leg	2nd leg
Cruz Azul	1–2	América	1–1	0–1

=== First leg ===
23 May 2024
20:00 CST (UTC−6)

Cruz Azul	1–1	América
Antuna 9' (pen.)	Report	Quiñones 16'

Estadio Ciudad de los Deportes, Mexico City
Attendance: 27,224
Referee: Fernando Hernández Gómez (Mexico City)

==== Details ====
Cruz Azul	América

GK	23	(Colombia) Kevin Mier
DF	29	(Argentina) Carlos Rotondi	(substituted off) 76'
DF	33	(Argentina) Gonzalo Piovi
DF	3	(Mexico) Carlos Salcedo
DF	4	(Colombia) Willer Ditta
DF	18	(Mexico) Rodrigo Huescas
MF	8	(Argentina) Lorenzo Faravelli	(substituted off) 71'
MF	19	(Mexico) Carlos Rodríguez
MF	15	(Uruguay) Ignacio Rivero (c)
MF	14	(Mexico) Alexis Gutiérrez
FW	7	(Mexico) Uriel Antuna	(substituted off) 82'
Substitutions:
GK	1	(Mexico) Andrés Gudiño
DF	13	(Uruguay) Camilo Cándido	(substituted on) 82'
DF	191	(Mexico) Raymundo Rubio
MF	6	(Mexico) Érik Lira	(substituted on) 76'
MF	194	(Mexico) Amaury Morales
MF	200	(Mexico) Jorge García
MF	208	(Mexico) Louis Estrada Derbez
FW	9	(Mexico) Ángel Sepúlveda	(substituted on) 71'
FW	210	(Mexico) Bryan Gamboa
FW	268	(Mexico) Mateo Levy
Manager:
(Argentina) Martín Anselmi

GK	1	(Mexico) Luis Malagón
DF	18	(Mexico) Cristian Calderón
DF	31	(Chile) Igor Lichnovsky
DF	29	(Mexico) Ramón Juárez
DF	3	(Mexico) Israel Reyes
MF	8	(Spain) Álvaro Fidalgo	(substituted off) 90+6'
MF	6	(Mexico) Jonathan dos Santos
MF	33	(Mexico) Julián Quiñones	(substituted off) 86'
MF	10	(Chile) Diego Valdés	(substituted off) 86'
MF	17	(United States) Alejandro Zendejas
FW	21	(Mexico) Henry Martín (c)	(substituted off) 78'
Substitutions:
GK	27	(Mexico) Óscar Jiménez
DF	2	(Mexico) Luis Fuentes
DF	14	(Mexico) Néstor Araujo
DF	23	(Mexico) Emilio Lara
MF	7	(Uruguay) Brian Rodríguez	(substituted on) 78'
MF	16	(Mexico) Santiago Naveda
MF	20	(Paraguay) Richard Sánchez	(substituted on) 86'
MF	26	(Mexico) Salvador Reyes	(substituted on) 90+6'
FW	24	(Netherlands) Javairô Dilrosun	(substituted on) 86'
FW	214	(Mexico) Patricio Salas
Manager:
(Brazil) André Jardine

Assistant referees:
Michel Alejandro Morales (Mexico City)
Enedina Caudillo Gómez (Michoacán)
Fourth official:
Luis Enrique Santander (Guanajuato)
Video assistant referee:
Guillermo Pacheco Larios (Sonora)
Assistant video assistant referee:
Oscar Mejía García (Mexico City)

==== Statistics ====
Statistic	Cruz Azul	América
Goals scored	1	1
Total shots	7	7
Shots on target	3	4
Saves	1	2
Ball possession	64%	36%
Corner kicks	7	3
Fouls committed	7	8
Offsides	1	1
Yellow cards	0	0
Red cards	0	0

=== Second leg ===
26 May 2024
19:00 CST (UTC−6)

América	1–0	Cruz Azul
Martín 78' (pen.)	Report

Estadio Azteca, Mexico City
Attendance: 73,604
Referee: Marco Antonio Ortiz (Durango)

América won 2–1 on aggregate.

==== Details ====
América	Cruz Azul

GK	1	(Mexico) Luis Malagón
DF	18	(Mexico) Cristian Calderón
DF	31	(Chile) Igor Lichnovsky
DF	29	(Mexico) Ramón Juárez
DF	3	(Mexico) Israel Reyes	(yellow card) 59'
MF	8	(Spain) Álvaro Fidalgo
MF	6	(Mexico) Jonathan dos Santos
MF	33	(Mexico) Julián Quiñones	(yellow card) 80'
MF	10	(Chile) Diego Valdés		(substituted off) 88'
MF	17	(United States) Alejandro Zendejas
FW	21	(Mexico) Henry Martín (c)	(yellow card) 79'	(substituted off) 90+3'
Substitutions:
GK	27	(Mexico) Óscar Jiménez
DF	2	(Mexico) Luis Fuentes
DF	4	(Uruguay) Sebastián Cáceres
DF	14	(Mexico) Néstor Araujo
DF	23	(Mexico) Emilio Lara
MF	7	(Uruguay) Brian Rodríguez
MF	16	(Mexico) Santiago Naveda
MF	20	(Paraguay) Richard Sánchez		(substituted on) 88'
MF	26	(Mexico) Salvador Reyes		(substituted on) 90+3'
FW	24	(Netherlands) Javairô Dilrosun
Manager:
(Brazil) André Jardine

GK	23	(Colombia) Kevin Mier
DF	29	(Argentina) Carlos Rotondi	(yellow card) 38'	(substituted off) 88'
DF	33	(Argentina) Gonzalo Piovi
DF	3	(Mexico) Carlos Salcedo		(substituted off) 84'
DF	4	(Colombia) Willer Ditta
DF	18	(Mexico) Rodrigo Huescas		(substituted off) 90+5'
MF	8	(Argentina) Lorenzo Faravelli		(substituted off) 88'
MF	19	(Mexico) Carlos Rodríguez
MF	15	(Uruguay) Ignacio Rivero (c)
MF	7	(Mexico) Uriel Antuna
FW	9	(Mexico) Ángel Sepúlveda
Substitutions:
GK	1	(Mexico) Andrés Gudiño
DF	13	(Uruguay) Camilo Cándido		(substituted on) 88'
DF	191	(Mexico) Raymundo Rubio
MF	6	(Mexico) Érik Lira
MF	14	(Mexico) Alexis Gutiérrez		(substituted on) 84'
MF	194	(Mexico) Amaury Morales
MF	200	(Mexico) Jorge García
MF	208	(Mexico) Louis Estrada Derbez
FW	210	(Mexico) Bryan Gamboa		(substituted on) 90+5'
FW	268	(Mexico) Mateo Levy		(substituted on) 88'
Manager:
(Argentina) Martín Anselmi

Assistant referees:
Michel Alejandro Morales (Mexico City)
Jorge Antonio Sánchez (State of Mexico)
Fourth official:
Daniel Quintero Huitrón (Jalisco)
Video assistant referee:
Erick Yair Miranda (Guanajuato)
Assistant video assistant referee:
Christian Kiabek Espinosa (Mexico City)

==== Statistics ====
Statistic	América	Cruz Azul
Goals scored	1	0
Total shots	11	13
Shots on target	5	5
Saves	5	4
Ball possession	47%	53%
Corner kicks	3	6
Fouls committed	7	10
Offsides	1	2
Yellow cards	3	1
Red cards	0	0

== Statistics ==
=== Goalscorers ===
There were 29 goals scored in 17 matches, for an average of 1.71 goals per match.

2 goals

- (Argentina) Germán Berterame (Monterrey)
- (Argentina) Lorenzo Faravelli (Cruz Azul)
- (Mexico) Henry Martín (América)
- (Mexico) Julián Quiñones (América)
- (Venezuela) Salomón Rondón (Pachuca)

1 goal

- (Mexico) Uriel Antuna (Cruz Azul)
- (Mexico) Alán Bautista (Pachuca)
- (Colombia) Diber Cambindo (Necaxa)
- (Spain) Sergio Canales (Monterrey)
- (Mexico) Jordi Cortizo (Monterrey)
- (Mexico) Brayan Garnica (Necaxa)
- (France) André-Pierre Gignac (UANL)
- (Mexico) Alexis Gutiérrez (Cruz Azul)
- (Mexico) Víctor Guzmán (Guadalajara)
- (Mexico) César Huerta (UNAM)
- (Morocco) Oussama Idrissi (Pachuca)
- (Mexico) Diego Lainez (UANL)
- (Argentina) Federico Lértora (Querétaro)
- (Mexico) Guillermo Martínez (UNAM)
- (Argentina) Maximiliano Meza (Monterrey)
- (Mexico) Israel Reyes (América)
- (Uruguay) Ignacio Rivero (Cruz Azul)
- (Argentina) Carlos Rotondi (Cruz Azul)
- (Mexico) Ángel Sepúlveda (Cruz Azul)

=== Assists ===
3 assists

- (Mexico) Rodrigo Huescas (Cruz Azul)

1 assist

- (Uruguay) Rodrigo Aguirre (Monterrey)
- (Mexico) Roberto Alvarado (Guadalajara)
- (Mexico) Pablo Barrera (Querétaro)
- (Argentina) Juan Brunetta (UANL)
- (Colombia) Diber Cambindo (Necaxa)
- (Uruguay) Camilo Cándido (Cruz Azul)
- (Netherlands) Javairô Dilrosun (América)
- (Mexico) Bryan González (Pachuca)
- (Mexico) Alexis Gutiérrez (Cruz Azul)
- (Mexico) César Huerta (UNAM)
- (Chile) Igor Lichnovsky (América)
- (Argentina) Lisandro Magallán (UNAM)
- (Mexico) Henry Martín (América)
- (Argentina) José Paradela (Necaxa)
- (Mexico) Diego Reyes (UANL)
- (Argentina) Jorge Rodríguez (Monterrey)
- (Mexico) Ángel Sepúlveda (Cruz Azul)
