= 2024–25 Cruz Azul season =

98th season in existence of Cruz Azul

Cruz Azul
2024–25 season
- Owner: Cooperativa La Cruz Azul
- Sporting director: Iván Alonso
- Manager: Martín Anselmi (until 24 January 2025); Vicente Sánchez (interim, from 25 January 2025, ratified on 23 February 2025)
- Stadium: Estadio Ciudad de los Deportes (until December 2024); Estadio Olímpico Universitario (from January 2025)
- Liga MX: Apertura: 1st (Semi-finals); Clausura: 3rd (Semi-finals)
- Leagues Cup: Round of 16
- CONCACAF Champions Cup: Winners
- Top goalscorer: League: Ignacio Rivero (15); All: Ángel Sepúlveda (23)
- Highest home attendance: 39,689 (v. Tigres UANL, CONCACAF Champions Cup, 1 May 2025)
- Lowest home attendance: 4,293 (v. Real Hope, CONCACAF Champions Cup, 11 February 2025)
- Average home league attendance: 23,140
- Biggest win: 5–0 vs Real Hope (H); CONCACAF Champions Cup, 11 February 2025; 5–0 vs Vancouver Whitecaps FC (H); CONCACAF Champions Cup, 1 June 2025
- Biggest defeat: 0–3 vs Tijuana (A); Apertura, 27 November 2024
| Home colours | Away colours | Third colours |

The 2024–25 season was Club de Futbol Cruz Azul's 98th season in existence and the 60th consecutive season in the top flight of Mexican football. In addition to the domestic league, the club also participated in the Leagues Cup and the CONCACAF Champions Cup.

This season began under head coach Martín Anselmi, who led the team to a first-place finish in the Apertura 2024 regular phase. During the summer transfer window, Luis Romo returned to the club in July 2024 to bolster the midfield. On 8 January 2025, before the start of the Clausura tournament, Cruz Azul relocated to the Estadio Olímpico Universitario. The move followed the conclusion of their temporary stay at the Estadio Ciudad de los Deportes due to logistical issues. Shortly after the relocation, the club executed a high-profile winter trade, sending Luis Romo to Guadalajara after only six months in exchange for defender Jesús Orozco.

Following Anselmi's sudden departure to join FC Porto on 24 January 2025, he was replaced by Vicente Sánchez, who served as interim manager before being ratified for the remainder of the season on 23 February 2025. Under Sánchez's leadership, the club ultimately secured their seventh CONCACAF Champions Cup title, defeating Vancouver Whitecaps FC 5–0 in the final.

== Coaching staff ==
| Position | Staff |
|---|---|
| Manager | (Uruguay) Vicente Sánchez |
| Assistant managers | (Mexico) Joel Huiqui |
| Assistant managers | (Mexico) Marco Calvillo |
| Goalkeeper coach | (Uruguay) Carlos Nicola |
| Fitness coaches | (Uruguay) Rubens Valenzuela |
| Fitness coaches | (Mexico) Fernando Ramos |
| Physiotherapists | (Mexico) Paolo Arriaga |
| Physiotherapists | (Mexico) José Morales |
| Team doctors | (Mexico) Antonio Acevedo |
| Team doctors | (Mexico) Juan Pérez |

Source: Liga MX

== Squad ==
As of 31 January 2025

| No. | Player | Nationality | Date of birth (age) | Since | Signed from |
Goalkeepers
| 1 | Andrés Gudiño | (Mexico) | 26 January 1997 (aged 28) | 2019 | (Mexico) Venados |
| 23 | Kevin Mier | (Colombia) | 18 May 2000 (aged 25) | 2024 | (Colombia) Atlético Nacional |
| 30 | Emmanuel Ochoa | (Mexico) | 5 May 2005 (aged 20) | 2025 | (United States) San Jose Earthquakes |
Defenders
| 2 | Jorge Sánchez | (Mexico) | 10 December 1997 (aged 27) | 2024 | (Netherlands) Ajax |
| 3 | Omar Campos | (Mexico) | 20 July 2002 (aged 22) | 2025 | (United States) Los Angeles FC |
| 4 | Willer Ditta | (Colombia) | 23 January 1997 (aged 28) | 2023 | (Argentina) Newell's Old Boys |
| 5 | Jesús Orozco | (Mexico) | 19 February 2002 (aged 23) | 2025 | (Mexico) Guadalajara |
| 22 | Raymundo Rubio | (Mexico) | 13 February 2001 (aged 24) | 2023 | (Mexico) Cruz Azul Academy |
| 26 | Carlos Vargas | (Mexico) | 14 February 1999 (aged 26) | 2023 | (Mexico) Mazatlán |
| 33 | Gonzalo Piovi | (Argentina) | 8 September 1994 (aged 30) | 2024 | (Argentina) Racing Club |
Midfielders
| 6 | Érik Lira | (Mexico) | 8 May 2000 (aged 25) | 2022 | (Mexico) UNAM |
| 7 | Mateusz Bogusz | (Poland) | 22 August 2001 (aged 23) | 2025 | (United States) Los Angeles FC |
| 8 | Lorenzo Faravelli | (Argentina) | 29 March 1993 (aged 32) | 2024 | (Ecuador) Independiente del Valle |
| 10 | Andrés Montaño | (Mexico) | 22 May 2002 (aged 23) | 2024 | (Mexico) Mazatlán |
| 14 | Alexis Gutiérrez | (Mexico) | 26 February 2000 (aged 25) | 2019 | (Mexico) Cruz Azul Academy |
| 15 | Ignacio Rivero (captain) | (Uruguay) | 10 April 1992 (aged 33) | 2020 | (Mexico) Tijuana |
| 17 | Amaury García | (Mexico) | 19 December 2001 (aged 23) | 2024 | (Mexico) UNAM |
| 18 | Luka Romero | (Argentina) | 18 November 2004 (aged 20) | 2025 | (Italy) AC Milan |
| 19 | Carlos Rodríguez (vice-captain) | (Mexico) | 3 January 1997 (aged 28) | 2022 | (Mexico) Monterrey |
| 29 | Carlos Rotondi | (Argentina) | 2 March 1997 (aged 28) | 2022 | (Argentina) Defensa y Justicia |
| 32 | Cristian Jiménez | (Mexico) | 18 July 2002 (aged 22) | 2021 | (Mexico) Cruz Azul Academy |
| 34 | Leonardo Sámano | (Mexico) | 18 June 2001 (aged 24) | 2024 | (Mexico) UNAM |
Forwards
| 9 | Ángel Sepúlveda | (Mexico) | 15 February 1991 (aged 34) | 2023 | (Mexico) Querétaro |
| 11 | Giorgos Giakoumakis | (Greece) | 11 December 1994 (aged 30) | 2024 | (United States) Atlanta United |
| 21 | Gabriel Fernández | (Uruguay) | 13 May 1994 (aged 31) | 2024 | (Mexico) UNAM |
| 35 | Luis Gutiérrez | (Mexico) | 17 October 2001 (aged 23) | 2024 | Free agent |

== Transfers ==
=== Summer ===
==== In ====
| Date | Pos. | No. | Player | From | Fee | Ref. |
|---|---|---|---|---|---|---|
| 16 June 2024 | FW | 11 | (Greece) Giorgos Giakoumakis | (United States) Atlanta United | $10,000,000 | |
| 19 June 2024 | MF | 10 | (Mexico) Andrés Montaño | (Mexico) Mazatlán | $4,000,000 | |
| 1 July 2024 | MF | 17 | (Mexico) Amaury García | (Mexico) UNAM | Undisclosed | |
| 1 July 2024 | MF | 34 | (Mexico) Leonardo Sámano | (Mexico) UNAM | Undisclosed | |
| 4 July 2024 | DF | 2 | (Mexico) Jorge Sánchez | (Netherlands) Ajax | $3,200,000 | |
| 5 July 2024 | FW | 35 | (Mexico) Luis Gutiérrez | Free agent | Free transfer | |
| 8 July 2024 | MF | 27 | (Mexico) Luis Romo | (Mexico) Monterrey | $7,000,000 | |

==== Out ====
| Date | Pos. | No. | Player | To | Fee | Ref. |
|---|---|---|---|---|---|---|
| 26 June 2024 | FW | 11 | (Uruguay) Christian Tabó | (Uruguay) Liverpool Montevideo | Free transfer | |
| 1 July 2024 | DF | 30 | (Mexico) Rafael Guerrero | (Mexico) Tigres UANL | Undisclosed | |
| 10 July 2024 | MF | 18 | (Mexico) Rodrigo Huescas | (Denmark) Copenhagen | $2,000,000 | |
| 16 July 2024 | FW | 21 | (Argentina) Augusto Lotti | (Argentina) Platense | Free transfer | |
| 4 August 2024 | DF | 3 | (Mexico) Carlos Salcedo | (Mexico) Juárez | Free transfer | |
| 27 August 2024 | MF | 7 | (Mexico) Uriel Antuna | (Mexico) Tigres UANL | $7,500,000 | |

=== Winter ===
==== In ====
| Date | Pos. | No. | Player | From | Fee | Ref. |
|---|---|---|---|---|---|---|
| 5 January 2025 | DF | 3 | (Mexico) Omar Campos | (United States) Los Angeles FC | $4,000,000 | |
| 11 January 2025 | DF | 5 | (Mexico) Jesús Orozco | (Mexico) Guadalajara | $11,000,000 (Note: As part of the same deal, Luis Romo moved to Guadalajara, and Cruz Azul reportedly paid an additional $4,500,000.) | |
| 17 January 2025 | GK | 30 | (Mexico) Emmanuel Ochoa | (United States) San Jose Earthquakes | Undisclosed | |
| 17 January 2025 | MF | 18 | (Argentina) Luka Romero | (Italy) AC Milan | $3,500,000 | |
| 25 January 2025 | MF | 7 | (Poland) Mateusz Bogusz | (United States) Los Angeles FC | $9,000,000 | |

==== Out ====
| Date | Pos. | No. | Player | To | Fee | Ref. |
|---|---|---|---|---|---|---|
| 2 January 2025 | GK | 12 | (Mexico) Luis Jiménez | (Mexico) Necaxa | End of loan | |
| 3 January 2025 | GK | — | (Mexico) Sebastián Jurado | (Mexico) Juárez | Undisclosed | |
| 6 January 2025 | FW | — | (Colombia) Diber Cambindo | (Mexico) Necaxa | $3,000,000 | |
| 6 January 2025 | DF | — | (Paraguay) Juan Escobar | (Spain) Castellón | Released | |
| 6 January 2025 | DF | 31 | (Mexico) Luis Iturbide | (Mexico) Cañoneros F.C. | Released | |
| 11 January 2025 | MF | 27 | (Mexico) Luis Romo | (Mexico) Guadalajara | Orozco + $4.5 million | |
| 22 January 2025 | DF | 13 | (Uruguay) Camilo Cándido | (Colombia) Atlético Nacional | Loan | |

== Pre-season and friendlies ==
=== Matches ===
| 21 June 2024 Copa por la Paz | Cruz Azul | 3–3 (4–5 p) | Guadalajara | Zacatecas |
| 19:50 PST | Gutiérrez 23'; Gamboa 27'; Morales 48' | Report | Olivas 1'; Cisneros 30'; Guzmán 86' (pen.) | Stadium: Estadio Carlos Vega Villalba |
| | Penalties |
| | Piovi (penalty scored); García (penalty missed); Montaño (penalty scored); Sámano (penalty scored); Levy (penalty scored) | | (penalty scored) Guzmán; (penalty scored) Marín; (penalty scored) Sánchez; (penalty scored) Beltrán; (penalty scored) Briseño |

| 23 June 2024 Copa por la Paz | Zacatecas | 0–2 | Cruz Azul | Zacatecas |
| 12:00 PST | | Report | Morales 64'; Levy 90' | Stadium: Estadio Carlos Vega Villalba |

| 29 June 2024 Copa Fundadores | Cruz Azul | 1–0 | América de Cali | Mexico City |
| 21:00 CST | Gutiérrez 18' | Report | | Stadium: Estadio Ciudad de los Deportes |

| 5 September 2024 Friendly | Oaxaca | 1–3 | Cruz Azul | Oaxaca |
| 20:00 CST | Luna 5' | Report | González 33'; Gutiérrez 48'; Sepúlveda 51' | Stadium: Estadio Tecnológico de Oaxaca |

| 16 November 2024 Friendly | Cruz Azul | 1–1 | Tigres UANL | Dallas, United States |
| 19:30 CST | Giakoumakis 19' | Report | Garza (yellow card) 44'; Piovi 71' (o.g.) | Stadium: Cotton Bowl |

| 19 March 2025 Friendly | Cruz Azul | 3–1 | León | Sacramento, United States |
| 20:00 PDT | Romero 33'; Gamboa 54', 60'; Montaño (yellow card) 77'; Fernandez (yellow card) 82' | Report | Mendoza 76' | Stadium: Heart Health Park |

| 22 March 2025 Friendly | Cruz Azul | 3–1 | Atlas | Fresno, United States |
| 19:00 PDT | Romero 7', 45'; Piovi (yellow card) 26'; Ditta (yellow card) 31'; Fernández 36'; Sánchez (yellow card) 79' | Report | Martín 75' | Stadium: Chukchansi Park |

== Competitions ==
In addition to league play, Cruz Azul will also participate in several cup competitions. In July and August, Liga MX play will halt for the Leagues Cup, an continental competition with Major League Soccer clubs hosted in Canada and the United States.

=== Overview ===
| Competition | First match | Last match | Starting round | Final position | Record | | | | | | | |
| Competition | First match | Last match | Starting round | Final position | Pld | W | D | L | GF | GA | GD | Win % |
|---|---|---|---|---|---|---|---|---|---|---|---|---|
| Liga MX Apertura | 6 July 2024 | 8 December 2024 | Matchday 1 | Semi-finals | 21 | 14 | 4 | 3 | 45 | 19 | +26 | 66.67 |
| Liga MX Clausura | 11 January 2025 | 18 May 2025 | Matchday 1 | Semi-finals | 21 | 12 | 6 | 3 | 33 | 21 | +12 | 57.14 |
| Leagues Cup | 31 July 2024 | 13 August 2024 | Group stage | Round of 16 | 4 | 0 | 4 | 0 | 3 | 3 | +0 | 0.00 |
| CONCACAF Champions Cup | 4 February 2025 | 1 June 2025 | Round one | Winners | 9 | 6 | 3 | 0 | 20 | 3 | +17 | 66.67 |
| Total | | | | | 55 | 32 | 17 | 6 | 101 | 46 | +55 | 58.18 |

Last updated: 1 June 2025
Source: Soccerway

=== Liga MX Apertura ===
==== League table ====
| Pos | Team | Pld | W | D | L | GF | GA | GD | Pts | Qualification |
|---|---|---|---|---|---|---|---|---|---|---|
| 1 | Cruz Azul | 17 | 13 | 3 | 1 | 39 | 12 | +27 | 42 | Qualification for the quarter–finals (Note: The first six places in the table qualifed for the Liguilla quarter-finals.) |
| 2 | Toluca | 17 | 10 | 5 | 2 | 38 | 16 | +22 | 35 | Qualification for the quarter–finals |
| 3 | Tigres UANL | 17 | 10 | 4 | 3 | 25 | 15 | +10 | 34 | Qualification for the quarter–finals |
| 4 | Pumas UNAM | 17 | 9 | 4 | 4 | 21 | 13 | +8 | 31 | Qualification for the quarter–finals |
| 5 | Monterrey | 17 | 9 | 4 | 4 | 26 | 19 | +7 | 31 | Qualification for the quarter–finals |

Source: Liga MX
Rules for classification: 1) Points; 2) Goal difference; 3) Number of goals scored; 4) Head-to-head results between tied teams; 5) Number of goals scored away; 6) Highest relegation coefficient; 7) Fair Play points

==== Results summary ====
| Overall | | | | | | | | Home | | | | | | Away | | | | | |
| Pld | W | D | L | GF | GA | GD | Pts | W | D | L | GF | GA | GD | W | D | L | GF | GA | GD |
|---|---|---|---|---|---|---|---|---|---|---|---|---|---|---|---|---|---|---|---|
| 21 | 14 | 4 | 3 | 45 | 19 | +26 | 46 | 8 | 2 | 1 | 26 | 7 | +19 | 6 | 2 | 2 | 19 | 12 | +7 |

Last updated: 8 December 2024.
Source: Soccerway

==== Results by round ====
| Round | 1 | 2 | 3 | 4 | 5 | 6 | 7 | 8 | 9 | 10 | 11 | 12 | 13 | 14 | 15 | 16 | 17 |
|---|---|---|---|---|---|---|---|---|---|---|---|---|---|---|---|---|---|
| Ground | H | A | H | H | A | H | A | A | H | A | H | A | H | A | H | A | H |
| Result | W | W | W | D | W | W | W | L | W | W | W | W | W | W | W | D | D |
| Position | 7 | 1 | 1 | 1 | 1 | 1 | 1 | 1 | 1 | 1 | 1 | 1 | 1 | 1 | 1 | 1 | 1 |
| Points | 3 | 6 | 9 | 10 | 13 | 16 | 19 | 19 | 22 | 25 | 28 | 31 | 34 | 37 | 40 | 41 | 42 |

Updated to match(es) played on 9 November 2024. Source: Liga MX
A = Away; H = Home; W = Win; D = Draw; L = Loss; P = Postponed

==== Matches ====
The league fixtures were announced on 10 June 2024.

===== Regular phase =====
| 6 July 2024 1 | Cruz Azul | 1–0 | Mazatlán | Mexico City |
| 21:00 CT | Ditta (yellow card) 39'; Piovi (yellow card) 72'; Cándido (red card) 75'; García (yellow card) 87'; Gamboa 90+4' | Report | Árciga (yellow card) 90+7' | Stadium: Estadio Ciudad de los Deportes; Attendance: 15,206; Referee: Karen Hernández Andrade |

| 13 July 2024 2 | Monterrey | 0–4 | Cruz Azul | Guadalupe |
| 21:10 CT | Berterame (yellow card) 63'; Fimbres (yellow card) 85' | Report | Rivero 14', (yellow card) 62'; Rotondi 28' (pen.), 50'; Sepúlveda 76' | Stadium: Estadio BBVA; Attendance: 45,957; Referee: Maximiliano Quintero Hernández |

| 16 July 2024 3 | Cruz Azul | 3–0 | Tijuana | Mexico City |
| 21:05 CT | Giakoumakis 33', 52'; Rivero 45+2'; García (yellow card) 48' | Report | Corona (yellow card) 40'; Reynoso (yellow card) 72' | Stadium: Estadio Ciudad de los Deportes; Attendance: 25,414; Referee: Ismael Rosario Lopez Peñuelas |

| 20 July 2024 4 | Cruz Azul | 1–1 | Toluca | Mexico City |
| 21:05 CT | Rodríguez (yellow card) 12'; Giakoumakis (yellow card) 55'; Sepúlveda 89' | Report | Gallardo (yellow card) 31'; Araújo 38'; Ruiz (yellow card) 41' | Stadium: Estadio Ciudad de los Deportes; Attendance: 25,862; Referee: Jesus Rafael Lopez Valle |

| 23 August 2024 5 | Querétaro | 0–2 | Cruz Azul | Querétaro |
| 19:00 CT | | Report | Rotondi 45' (pen.); Faravelli (yellow card) 71'; Sánchez (yellow card) 85'; Giakoumakis (yellow card) 87'; Mier (yellow card) 90+3'; Morales 90+9' | Stadium: Estadio Corregidora; Attendance: 27,884; Referee: Guillermo Pacheco Larios |

| 31 August 2024 6 | Cruz Azul | 4–1 | América | Mexico City |
| 21:10 CT | Romo (yellow card) 39'; Giakoumakis 44'; Sepúlveda 45+3'; Lira (yellow card) 62'; Rotondi (yellow card) 63'; Gutiérrez 79'; Faravelli 90' | Report | Rodríguez 17'; Malagón (yellow card) 34'; Dos Santos (yellow card) 52'; Araujo (yellow card) 71' | Stadium: Estadio Ciudad de los Deportes; Attendance: 25,282; Referee: César Arturo Ramos Palazuelos |

| 14 September 2024 7 | León | 1–2 | Cruz Azul | León |
| 20:35 CT | Cádiz 5'; Hernández (yellow card) 25'; Bellón (yellow card) 36' | Report | Rodríguez (yellow card) 29'; Faravelli (yellow card) 29', (goal) 45+2'; Piovi (yellow card) 42'; Rotondi 83' | Stadium: Estadio León; Attendance: 21,585; Referee: Maximiliano Quintero Hernández |

| 17 September 2024 8 | Atlético San Luis | 3–1 | Cruz Azul | San Luis Potosí |
| 19:00 CT | Boli 35'; Güémez 45+4'; Sánchez (yellow card) 66'; Lira 90+7' (o.g.) | Report | Rivero 32'; Piovi (red card) 74' | Stadium: Estadio Alfonso Lastras; Attendance: 18,971; Referee: Óscar Mejía García |

| 21 September 2024 9 | Cruz Azul | 1–0 | Guadalajara | Mexico City |
| 21:05 CT | Rivero (yellow card) 34', (goal) 60' | Report | Beltrán (yellow card) 30' | Stadium: Estadio Ciudad de los Deportes; Attendance: 25,851; Referee: Daniel Quintero Huitrón |

| 28 September 2024 10 | Pachuca | 2–4 | Cruz Azul | Pachuca |
| 19:05 CT | Hernández 12'; Rondón 42'; Cabral (yellow card) 45+4'; Barreto (yellow card) 45+7' (yellow-red card) 48'; Berlanga (yellow card) 86' | Report | Rotondi (yellow card) 9'; Rivero (yellow card) 21'; Giakoumakis 45', 55'; Piovi (yellow card) 60'; Faravelli 66'; Sepúlveda 90+1' | Stadium: Estadio Hidalgo; Attendance: 14,462; Referee: Adonai Escobedo González |

| 5 October 2024 11 | Cruz Azul | 3–0 | Necaxa | Mexico City |
| 17:00 CT | Gutiérrez 8'; Rotondi 18'; Faravelli 63' | Report | | Stadium: Estadio Ciudad de los Deportes; Attendance: 25,589; Referee: Guillermo Pacheco Larios |

| 18 October 2024 12 | Puebla | 1–2 | Cruz Azul | Puebla |
| 21:05 CT | Quiñones 45+7'; Olmedo (yellow card) 85' | Report | Giakoumakis 45+4', (yellow card) 47'; Faravelli (yellow card) 58'; Rotondi 71' (pen.); Piovi (yellow card) 88' | Stadium: Estadio Cuauhtémoc; Attendance: 34,978; Referee: Mario Terrazas Chávez |

| 23 October 2024 13 | Cruz Azul | 4–0 | Juárez | Mexico City |
| 19:00 CT | Faravelli 8'; Sepúlveda 28', 50'; Fernández 72'; Sánchez (yellow card) 90' | Report | Edson (yellow card) 78' | Stadium: Estadio Ciudad de los Deportes; Attendance: 26,278; Referee: Vicente Reynoso Arce |

| 26 October 2024 14 | UNAM | 0–2 | Cruz Azul | Mexico City |
| 18:00 CT | Duarte (yellow card) 10'; Silva (yellow card) 50' | Report | Sepúlveda 1', (yellow card) 35'; Rivero 12'; Ditta (yellow card) 34' | Stadium: Estadio Olímpico Universitario; Attendance: 37,576; Referee: César Arturo Ramos Palazuelos |

| 2 November 2024 15 | Cruz Azul | 2–0 | Santos Laguna | Mexico City |
| 21:10 CT | Sánchez 23'; Sepúlveda 68'; Piovi (yellow card) 83' | Report | Gutiérrez (yellow card) 41'; Jiménez (yellow card) 44'; Mariscal (yellow card) 50'; Fagúndez (yellow card) 83' | Stadium: Estadio Ciudad de los Deportes; Attendance: 24,271; Referee: Karen Hernández Andrade |

| 6 November 2024 16 | Atlas | 2–2 | Cruz Azul | Guadalajara |
| 21:05 CT | Aguirre 18'; Dória (yellow card) 80'; Márquez (yellow card) 85'; Zaldívar 88' | Report | Gutiérrez 5'; Rotondi 45+5' (pen.); Ditta (yellow card) 80'; Rivero (yellow card) 81' | Stadium: Estadio Jalisco; Attendance: 24,204; Referee: Víctor Alfonso Cáceres Hernández |

| 9 November 2024 17 | Cruz Azul | 1–1 | UANL | Mexico City |
| 21:05 CT | Romo (yellow card) 2'; Lira (yellow card) 45'; Morales (yellow card) 90+4'; Sepúlveda 90+8', (yellow card) 90+9' | Report | Ibáñez 88' (pen.); Purata (yellow card) 90+5' | Stadium: Estadio Ciudad de los Deportes; Attendance: 26,536; Referee: Adonai Escobedo González |

===== Final phase =====
====== Quarter-finals ======
| 27 November 2024 First leg | Tijuana | 3–0 | Cruz Azul | Tijuana |
| 20:10 PT | Zúñiga 10'; Álvarez 19'; Reynoso 42' | Report | Sánchez (red card) 34' | Stadium: Estadio Caliente; Attendance: 25,333; Referee: Fernando Hernández Gómez |

| 30 November 2024 Second leg | Cruz Azul | 3–0 (3 (s)–3 agg.) | Tijuana | Mexico City |
| 19:10 CT | Rivero 44'; Giakoumakis 54'; Sepúlveda 74'; Ditta (yellow card) 90+4' | Report | Gómez (yellow card) 62' | Stadium: Estadio Ciudad de los Deportes; Attendance: 24,975; Referee: Víctor Alfonso Cáceres Hernández |

====== Semi-finals ======
| 5 December 2024 First leg | América | 0–0 | Cruz Azul | Mexico City |
| 20:00 CT | | Report | Piovi (yellow card) 88' | Stadium: Estadio Ciudad de los Deportes; Attendance: 29,401; Referee: Oscar Mejía García |

| 8 December 2024 Second leg | Cruz Azul | 3–4 (3–4 agg.) | América | Mexico City |
| 19:00 CT | Faravelli (yellow card) 42'; Rodríguez (yellow card) 66'; Ditta (yellow card) 66'; Rivero 68'; Fernández 80'; Morales 86', (yellow card) 88' | Report | Zendejas 15'; Sánchez 49'; Borja (yellow card) 58'; Juárez 72'; Aguirre 90+4' (pen.), (yellow card) 90+5' (yellow-red card) 90+8' | Stadium: Estadio Ciudad de los Deportes; Attendance: 29,404; Referee: Adonai Escobedo González |

=== Liga MX Clausura ===
==== League table ====
| Pos | Team | Pld | W | D | L | GF | GA | GD | Pts | Qualification |
|---|---|---|---|---|---|---|---|---|---|---|
| 1 | Toluca (C) | 17 | 11 | 4 | 2 | 41 | 22 | +19 | 37 | Qualification for the quarter–finals (Note: The first six places in the table qualified for the Liguilla quarter-finals.) |
| 2 | América | 17 | 10 | 4 | 3 | 34 | 10 | +24 | 34 | Qualification for the quarter–finals |
| 3 | Cruz Azul | 17 | 9 | 6 | 2 | 26 | 16 | +10 | 33 | Qualification for the quarter–finals |
| 4 | Tigres UANL | 17 | 10 | 3 | 4 | 24 | 14 | +10 | 33 | Qualification for the quarter–finals |
| 5 | Necaxa | 17 | 10 | 1 | 6 | 36 | 29 | +7 | 31 | Qualification for the quarter–finals |

Source: Liga MX
Rules for classification: 1) Points; 2) Goal difference; 3) Number of goals scored; 4) Head-to-head results between tied teams; 5) Number of goals scored away; 6) Highest relegation coefficient; 7) Fair Play points
(C) Champions

==== Results summary ====
| Overall | | | | | | | | Home | | | | | | Away | | | | | |
| Pld | W | D | L | GF | GA | GD | Pts | W | D | L | GF | GA | GD | W | D | L | GF | GA | GD |
|---|---|---|---|---|---|---|---|---|---|---|---|---|---|---|---|---|---|---|---|
| 21 | 12 | 6 | 3 | 33 | 21 | +12 | 42 | 7 | 3 | 0 | 17 | 8 | +9 | 5 | 3 | 3 | 16 | 13 | +3 |

Last updated: 18 May 2025.
Source: Soccerway

==== Results by round ====
| Round | 1 | 2 | 3 | 4 | 5 | 6 | 7 | 9^{1} | 8 | 10 | 11 | 12 | 13 | 14 | 15 | 16 | 17 |
|---|---|---|---|---|---|---|---|---|---|---|---|---|---|---|---|---|---|
| Ground | H | A | H | A | A | H | A | A | H | A | H | H | A | H | A | H | A |
| Result | D | L | D | W | W | W | L | W | W | D | D | W | W | W | D | W | D |
| Position | 11 | 16 | 17 | 9 | 6 | 4 | 8 | 5 | 5 | 6 | 5 | 5 | 5 | 3 | 5 | 2 | 3 |
| Points | 1 | 1 | 2 | 5 | 8 | 11 | 11 | 14 | 17 | 18 | 19 | 22 | 25 | 28 | 29 | 32 | 33 |

Updated to match(es) played on 19 April 2025. Source: Liga MX
A = Away; H = Home; W = Win; D = Draw; L = Loss; P = Postponed
Notes:
- ^{1} Matchday 9 (v. Santos Laguna) was moved forward due to Cruz Azul's involvement in the CONCACAF Champions Cup.

==== Matches ====
The league fixtures were announced on 15 December 2024.

===== Regular phase =====
| 11 January 2025 1 | Cruz Azul | 1–1 | Atlas | Mexico City |
| 21:05 CST | Sepúlveda 38'; Fernández (yellow card) 67' | Report | Đurđević 52'; Ríos (yellow card) 90+2' | Stadium: Estadio Olímpico Universitario; Attendance: 9,732; Referee: Maximiliano Quintero Hernández |

| 18 January 2025 2 | Juárez | 1–0 | Cruz Azul | Ciudad Juárez |
| 16:00 MST | Rodríguez 19', (yellow card) 78'; Mosquera (yellow card) 23'; González (yellow card) 45' | Report | Piovi (yellow card) 11'; Orozco (yellow card) 52'; Sánchez (yellow card) 84' | Stadium: Estadio Olímpico Benito Juárez; Attendance: 13,256; Referee: Iván López Sánchez |
Note: Fixture was initially scheduled for a 20:10 kick-off, but was moved due to the low temperatures expected in Ciudad Juárez.

| 25 January 2025 3 | Cruz Azul | 1–1 | Puebla | Mexico City |
| 17:00 CST | Faravelli 2'; Rodríguez (yellow card) 65'; Lira (yellow card) 66'; Piovi (yellow card) 77' | Report | Gómez 15'; Mares (yellow card) 27'; Waller (yellow card) 66' | Stadium: Estadio Olímpico Universitario; Attendance: 10,074; Referee: Jorge Abraham Camacho Peregrina |

| 28 January 2025 4 | Necaxa | 1–3 | Cruz Azul | Aguascalientes |
| 21:05 CST | Cambindo 18' | Report | Lira (yellow card) 30', (goal) 38'; Orozco (yellow card) 45'; Giakoumakis 72'; Faravelli 90+1' | Stadium: Estadio Victoria; Attendance: 16,866; Referee: Luis Alfredo García Rodríguez |

| 31 January 2025 5 | Tijuana | 2–3 | Cruz Azul | Tijuana |
| 19:05 PST | Bilbao (yellow card) 18'; Tona 64'; Zúñiga 69'; Gómez (yellow card) 80' | Report | Romero 6'; Giakoumakis 33', (yellow card) 68'; Rotondi 45' (pen.); Orozco (yellow card) 55'; Piovi (yellow card) 59'; Rodríguez (yellow card) 77'; Ditta (yellow card) 80' | Stadium: Estadio Caliente; Attendance: 23,333; Referee: Mario Terrazas Chávez |

| 8 February 2025 6 | Cruz Azul | 2–1 | Pachuca | Mexico City |
| 21:05 CST | Rivero 22'; Giakoumakis (yellow card) 38'; Ditta (yellow card) 68'; Sepúlveda (yellow card) 81'; Fernández 90' | Report | Bauermann (yellow card) 36' (yellow-red card) 84'; Rondón 79' | Stadium: Estadio Olímpico Universitario; Attendance: 10,733; Referee: César Arturo Ramos Palazuelos |

| 15 February 2025 7 | UANL | 2–1 | Cruz Azul | San Nicolás de los Garza |
| 19:00 CST | Garza (yellow card) 26'; Joaquim (yellow card) 45+3', (goal) 53'; Lainez 47'; Aquino (yellow card) 55'; Ibáñez (red card) 65'; Guzmán (yellow card) 90+7' | Report | Giakoumakis (yellow card) 41'; Faravelli (yellow card) 79'; Lira (yellow card) 79'; Rodríguez (yellow card) 80'; Rivero 90+8' | Stadium: Estadio Universitario; Attendance: 41,615; Referee: Víctor Alfonso Cáceres Hernández |

| 19 February 2025 9 | Santos Laguna | 0–1 | Cruz Azul | Torreón |
| 21:05 CST | Barticciotto (yellow card) 10'; Naveda (yellow card) 15' | Report | Rivero 11'; Lira (yellow card) 58'; Bogusz (yellow card) 68'; Sepúlveda (yellow card) 90+5' | Stadium: Estadio Corona; Attendance: 14,020; Referee: Jesús Rafael López Valle |
Note: Fixture was moved forward due to Cruz Azul's participation in the CONCACAF Champions Cup.

| 23 February 2025 8 | Cruz Azul | 1–0 | Querétaro | Mexico City |
| 19:05 CST | Ditta (yellow card) 4'; Sepúlveda 76' | Report | Preciado (yellow card) 88' | Stadium: Estadio Olímpico Universitario; Attendance: 11,477; Referee: Jorge Abraham Camacho Peregrina |

| 28 February 2025 10 | Mazatlán | 1–1 | Cruz Azul | Mazatlán |
| 20:00 MST | Pizarro (yellow card) 59'; Benedetti 86' (pen.); Duarte (yellow card) 90+5' | Report | Orozco (yellow card) 59'; Bogusz 62'; Faravelli (yellow card) 72'; Rivero (yellow card) 84'; Montaño (yellow card) 90+6' | Stadium: Estadio de Mazatlán; Attendance: 11,098; Referee: Luis Alfredo García Rodríguez |

| 8 March 2025 11 | Cruz Azul | 1–1 | Monterrey | Mexico City |
| 19:05 CST | Rivero 21'; Piovi (red card) 74'; Rotondi (yellow card) 90+7' | Report | Ramos 12'; Medina (yellow card) 16'; Berterame (yellow card) 85' | Stadium: Estadio Olímpico Universitario; Attendance: 22,895; Referee: Oscar Mejía García |

| 15 March 2025 12 | Cruz Azul | 3–0 | Atlético San Luis | Mexico City |
| 19:00 CST | Sepúlveda 8', 13'; Orozco (yellow card) 83'; Montaño 88' | Report | | Stadium: Estadio Olímpico Universitario; Attendance: 15,933; Referee: Víctor Alfonso Cáceres Hernández |

| 29 March 2025 13 | Guadalajara | 0–1 | Cruz Azul | Guadalajara |
| 21:05 CST | Chávez (yellow card) 62'; Wilke (yellow card) 90+6' | Report | Rivero 45+2'; Piovi (yellow card) 45+4'; Ditta (yellow card) 90+6' | Stadium: Estadio Jalisco; Attendance: 30,415; Referee: Jesús Rafael López Valle |
Note: Due to disciplinary sanctions imposed two weeks prior, as a result of incidents at the end of the El Super Clásico on Matchday 11 at Estadio Akron, this match was relocated to Estadio Jalisco, Guadalajara.

| 5 April 2025 14 | Cruz Azul | 3–2 | UNAM | Puebla |
| 21:10 CST | Rotondi 28', 61'; Montaño 45+6'; Giakoumakis (yellow card) 65'; Romero (yellow card) 71' | Report | Funes Mori (yellow card) 14'; Pussetto 16'; Ruvalcaba (yellow card) 50'; Martínez (yellow card) 72'; Carrasquilla 81' (pen.) | Stadium: Estadio Cuauhtémoc; Attendance: 37,561; Referee: Daniel Quintero Huitrón |
Note: Due to a contractual agreement between Cruz Azul and UNAM, Cruz Azul is not allowed to play as the home team against UNAM at the Estadio Olímpico Universitario. Therefore, this match was relocated to the Estadio Cuauhtémoc, Puebla.

| 12 April 2025 15 | América | 0–0 | Cruz Azul | Mexico City |
| 21:15 CST | | Report | Bogusz (yellow card) 68' | Stadium: Estadio Ciudad de los Deportes; Attendance: 24,520; Referee: César Arturo Ramos Palazuelos |

| 15 April 2025 16 | Cruz Azul | 2–1 | León | Mexico City |
| 21:05 CST | Rodríguez (yellow card) 11'; Romero 84'; Fernández 90+3' | Report | Fonseca (yellow card) 43' (yellow-red card) 74'; Mendoza 58'; Jiménez (yellow card) 89'; Fierro (yellow card) 90+6' | Stadium: Estadio Olímpico Universitario; Attendance: 37,348; Referee: Oscar Mejía García |

| 19 April 2025 17 | Toluca | 2–2 | Cruz Azul | Toluca |
| 19:05 CST | Domínguez 30'; López (yellow card) 42'; Gallardo 43'; Herrera (yellow card) 45+4' | Report | Fernández 2'; Ditta (yellow card) 33'; Rotondi (yellow card) 37', (goal) 45+3'; Faravelli (yellow card) 63' | Stadium: Estadio Nemesio Díez; Attendance: 27,263; Referee: Luis Enrique Santander Aguirre |

===== Final phase =====
====== Quarter-finals ======
| 8 May 2025 First leg | León | 2–3 | Cruz Azul | León |
| 21:10 CST | Echeverría (yellow card) 28'; Santos 29'; Moreno 46'; Frías (red card) 51'; Guardado (yellow card) 90+4' | Report | Rivero 14', (yellow card) 90+7'; Montaño 19', 41'; Jiménez (yellow card) 36'; Rotondi (yellow card) 90+4' | Stadium: Estadio León; Attendance: 13,667; Referee: César Arturo Ramos Palazuelos |

| 11 May 2025 Second leg | Cruz Azul | 2–1 (5–3 agg.) | León | Mexico City |
| 19:00 CST | Rivero 33'; Orozco (yellow card) 46'; Echeverría 66' (o.g.) | Report | Cádiz 39'; Barreiro (yellow card) 53' | Stadium: Estadio Olímpico Universitario; Attendance: 20,577; Referee: Víctor Alfonso Cáceres Hernández |

====== Semi-finals ======
| 15 May 2025 First leg | Cruz Azul | 1–0 | América | Mexico City |
| 20:00 CST | Rivero 59', (red card) 66' | Report | Zendejas (yellow card) 90+1' | Stadium: Estadio Olímpico Universitario; Attendance: 34,951; Referee: Luis Enrique Santander Aguirre |

| 18 May 2025 Second leg | América | 2–1 (2 (s)–2 agg.) | Cruz Azul | Mexico City |
| 19:15 CST | Martín 66' (pen.); Borja 79', (yellow card) 80' | Report | Ditta (yellow card) 36'; Faravelli (yellow card) 45+1', (goal) 57' | Stadium: Estadio Ciudad de los Deportes; Attendance: 30,872; Referee: Víctor Alfonso Cáceres Hernández |

=== Leagues Cup ===
==== Group stage (East 4) ====
The draw for the group stage was held on 31 January 2024 with the fixtures announced on 14 March.

| Pos | Team | Pld | W | PW | PL | L | GF | GA | GD | Pts | Qualification | PHI | CAZ | CLT |
|---|---|---|---|---|---|---|---|---|---|---|---|---|---|---|
| 1 | (United States Soccer Federation) Philadelphia Union | 2 | 1 | 0 | 1 | 0 | 2 | 1 | +1 | 4 | Advance to knockout stage | — | 1–1 | 1–0 |
| 2 | (Mexican Football Federation) Cruz Azul | 2 | 0 | 1 | 1 | 0 | 1 | 1 | 0 | 3 | Advance to knockout stage | — | — | — |
| 3 | (United States Soccer Federation) Charlotte FC | 2 | 0 | 1 | 0 | 1 | 0 | 1 | −1 | 2 | | — | 0–0 | — |

Source: Leagues Cup
Rules for classification: Tiebreakers

| 31 July 2024 1 | Charlotte FC (United States) | 0–0 (4–2 p) | (Mexico) Cruz Azul | Charlotte, United States |
| 20:00 EDT | Bronico (yellow card) 64'; Westwood (yellow card) 65' | Report | Rotondi (yellow card) 54'; Ditta (yellow card) 64' | Stadium: Bank of America Stadium; Attendance: 33,329; Referee: Bryan López |
| | Penalties |
| | Świderski (penalty scored); Westwood (penalty scored); Agyemang (penalty scored); Bronico (penalty scored) | | (penalty scored) Antuna; (penalty missed) Rodríguez; (penalty scored) Rivero; (penalty missed) Romo |

| 4 August 2024 2 | Philadelphia Union (United States) | 1–1 (3–5 p) | (Mexico) Cruz Azul | Chester, United States |
| 20:00 EDT | Bedoya (yellow card) 2'; Sullivan (yellow card) 37'; Lowe (yellow card) 55'; Gazdag (yellow card) 59', (goal) 88' | Report | Rotondi 41', (yellow card) 59'; Romo (yellow card) 51'; Antuna (yellow card) 90+2' | Stadium: Subaru Park; Attendance: 18,680; Referee: Jorge Abraham Camacho Peregrina |
| | Penalties |
| | Gazdag (penalty missed); Elliott (penalty scored); Martínez (penalty scored); Adeniran (penalty scored) | | (penalty scored) Piovi; (penalty scored) Montaño; (penalty scored) Ditta; (penalty scored) Rotondi; (penalty scored) Sepúlveda |

==== Knockout stage ====
Cruz Azul advanced to the knockout phase as group runners-up. They were then drawn away to Orlando City SC in the round of 32, and to fellow Liga MX side Mazatlán in the round of 16.

| 9 August 2024 Round of 32 | Orlando City SC (United States) | 0–0 (4–5 p) | (Mexico) Cruz Azul | Orlando, United States |
| 19:30 EDT | Brekalo (yellow card) 46' | Report | Piovi (yellow card) 85' | Stadium: Inter&Co Stadium; Attendance: 17,057; Referee: Fernando Guerrero (Mexico) |
| | Penalties |
| | Jansson (penalty missed); Lodeiro (penalty scored); Muriel (penalty scored); McGuire (penalty scored); Torres (penalty scored); Þórhallsson (penalty missed) | | (penalty missed) Rivero; (penalty scored) Montaño; (penalty scored) Ditta; (penalty scored) Piovi; (penalty scored) Sepúlveda; (penalty scored) Antuna |

| 13 August 2024 Round of 16 | Cruz Azul (Mexico) | 2–2 (1–3 p) | (Mexico) Mazatlán | Washington, D.C., United States |
| 20:00 EDT | Piovi (yellow card) 45+4' (yellow-red card) 49'; Antuna (yellow card) 72', (goal) 84'; Ditta 90+1' | Report | Colula 40'; Bárcenas 45+1'; Almada (yellow card) 46'; Meraz (yellow card) 69'; Torres (yellow card) 90+3' | Stadium: Audi Field; Referee: Luis Enrique Santander (Mexico) |
| | Penalties |
| | Antuna (penalty missed); Rotondi (penalty scored); Ditta (penalty missed); Giakoumakis (penalty missed) | | (penalty scored) Bárcenas; (penalty scored) Colula; (penalty scored) Torres |

=== CONCACAF Champions Cup ===
==== Round one ====
The draw for round one took place on 10 December 2024 at CONCACAF's headquarters in Miami, Florida. Cruz Azul were drawn against reigning Ligue Haïtienne champions Real Hope.

| 4 February 2025 First leg | Real Hope (Haiti) | 0–2 | (Mexico) Cruz Azul | Santiago de los Caballeros, Dominican Republic |
| 21:00 AST | Michel (yellow card) 2' | Report | Sepúlveda 38'; Guillaume 83' (o.g.); García (yellow card) 90+3' | Stadium: Estadio Cibao FC; Attendance: 1,017; Referee: Natalie Simon (United States) |

| 11 February 2025 Second leg | Cruz Azul (Mexico) | 5–0 (7–0 agg.) | (Haiti) Real Hope | Mexico City, Mexico |
| 21:00 CST | Sepúlveda 21', 24'; Fernández 26', 75'; Montaño 60' | Report | | Stadium: Estadio Olímpico Universitario; Attendance: 4,293; Referee: Julio Luna (Guatemala) |

==== Round of 16 ====
Cruz Azul were drawn against American side Seattle Sounders FC.

| 5 March 2025 First leg | Seattle Sounders FC (United States) | 0–0 | (Mexico) Cruz Azul | Seattle, United States |
| 19:30 PST | Rusnák (yellow card) 39' | Report | Fernández (yellow card) 45+3'; Faravelli (yellow card) 90+1' | Stadium: Lumen Field; Attendance: 27,844; Referee: Julio Luna (Guatemala) |

| 11 March 2025 Second leg | Cruz Azul (Mexico) | 4–1 (4–1 agg.) | (United States) Seattle Sounders FC | Mexico City, Mexico |
| 18:30 CST | Rodríguez 33', (yellow card) 45+4'; Rotondi (yellow card) 38'; Sepúlveda 71' (pen.); Bogusz (yellow card) 80'; Romero 85'; Sánchez 88' | Report | Vargas (yellow card) 50'; Musovski 74' | Stadium: Estadio Olímpico Universitario; Attendance: 7,473; Referee: Oshane Nation (Jamaica) |

==== Quarter-finals ====
Cruz Azul were drawn against fellow Mexican champions América.

| 1 April 2025 First leg | América (Mexico) | 0–0 | (Mexico) Cruz Azul | Mexico City, Mexico |
| 19:15 CST | Aguirre (yellow card) 86' | Report | Rivero (yellow card) 12'; Ditta (yellow card) 75'; Sánchez (yellow card) 88' | Stadium: Estadio Ciudad de los Deportes; Attendance: 19,720; Referee: Joe Dickerson (United States) |

| 8 April 2025 Second leg | Cruz Azul (Mexico) | 2–1 (2–1 agg.) | (Mexico) América | Mexico City, Mexico |
| 21:30 CST | Piovi (yellow card) 9'; Sepúlveda 12', 85', (yellow card) 86'; Faravelli (yellow card) 36'; Lira (yellow card) 63' | Report | Valdés (yellow card) 29'; Juárez (yellow card) 35'; Fidalgo 57'; Cáceres (yellow card) 73'; Araujo (yellow card) 88' | Stadium: Estadio Olímpico Universitario; Attendance: 27,923; Referee: Ismael Cornejo (El Salvador) |

==== Semi-finals ====
Cruz Azul were drawn against fellow Mexican side Tigres UANL.

| 23 April 2025 First leg | (Mexico) UANL | 1–1 | Cruz Azul (Mexico) | San Nicolás de los Garza, Mexico |
| 20:00 CST | Purata (yellow card) 3', (goal) 84' | Report | Sepúlveda (yellow card) 13'; Rivero (yellow card) 35'; Rotondi 68' | Stadium: Estadio Universitario; Attendance: 31,251; Referee: Iván Barton (El Salvador) |

| 1 May 2025 Second leg | (Mexico) Cruz Azul | 1–0 (2–1 agg.) | UANL (Mexico) | Mexico City, Mexico |
| 20:00 CST | Faravelli (yellow card) 29'; Sepúlveda 82' (pen.) | Report | Aquino (yellow card) 19'; Córdova (yellow card) 30'; Ibáñez (yellow card) 55'; Vigón (yellow card) 85' | Stadium: Estadio Olímpico Universitario; Attendance: 39,689; Referee: Drew Fischer (Canada) |

==== Final ====
The final was held on 1 June 2025 in Mexico City, with Cruz Azul facing Canadian side Vancouver Whitecaps FC. This was Cruz Azul's seventh CONCACAF Champions Cup final, only behind América for the most final appearances by any club in the CONCACAF region, including Mexican teams. (Note: While Cruz Azul has won seven titles overall, two of those (1970 and 1996) were won without a final match being played.)

| 1 June 2025 Final | Cruz Azul (Mexico) | 5–0 | (Canada) Vancouver Whitecaps FC | Mexico City, Mexico |
| 19:00 CST | Rivero 8'; Faravelli 28'; Sepúlveda 37', 50'; Bogusz 45' | Report | Veselinović (yellow card) 65' | Stadium: Estadio Olímpico Universitario; Attendance: 33,046; Referee: Walter López (Guatemala) |

== Statistics ==
=== Squad statistics ===
| No. | Pos | Nat | Player | Total | | Liga MX Apertura | | Liga MX Clausura | | Leagues Cup | | Champions Cup | |
| No. | Pos | Nat | Player | Apps | Goals | Apps | Goals | Apps | Goals | Apps | Goals | Apps | Goals |
|---|---|---|---|---|---|---|---|---|---|---|---|---|---|
| 1 | GK | (Mexico) MEX | Andrés Gudiño | 3 | 0 | 0+0 | 0 | 1+0 | 0 | 0+0 | 0 | 2+0 | 0 |
| 2 | DF | (Mexico) MEX | Jorge Sánchez | 46 | 2 | 16+2 | 1 | 16+1 | 0 | 3+1 | 0 | 6+1 | 1 |
| 3 | DF | (Mexico) MEX | Omar Campos | 9 | 0 | 0+0 | 0 | 3+3 | 0 | 0+0 | 0 | 3+0 | 0 |
| 4 | DF | (Colombia) COL | Willer Ditta | 52 | 1 | 21+0 | 0 | 19+0 | 0 | 4+0 | 1 | 8+0 | 0 |
| 5 | DF | (Mexico) MEX | Jesús Orozco | 25 | 0 | 0+0 | 0 | 16+2 | 0 | 0+0 | 0 | 4+3 | 0 |
| 6 | MF | (Mexico) MEX | Érik Lira | 50 | 1 | 18+2 | 0 | 18+1 | 1 | 3+1 | 0 | 7+0 | 0 |
| 7 | MF | (Poland) POL | Mateusz Bogusz | 22 | 2 | 0+0 | 0 | 11+3 | 1 | 0+0 | 0 | 6+2 | 1 |
| 8 | MF | (Argentina) ARG | Lorenzo Faravelli | 50 | 9 | 17+1 | 5 | 15+5 | 3 | 3+1 | 0 | 8+0 | 1 |
| 9 | FW | (Mexico) MEX | Ángel Sepúlveda | 50 | 23 | 10+11 | 10 | 12+6 | 4 | 0+3 | 0 | 8+0 | 9 |
| 10 | MF | (Mexico) MEX | Andrés Montaño | 38 | 5 | 3+16 | 0 | 4+5 | 4 | 1+3 | 0 | 3+3 | 1 |
| 11 | FW | (Greece) GRE | Giorgos Giakoumakis | 40 | 9 | 12+5 | 7 | 7+10 | 2 | 4+0 | 0 | 0+2 | 0 |
| 14 | MF | (Mexico) MEX | Alexis Gutiérrez | 45 | 3 | 18+3 | 3 | 7+6 | 0 | 3+1 | 0 | 3+4 | 0 |
| 15 | MF | (Uruguay) URU | Ignacio Rivero | 49 | 16 | 15+5 | 7 | 14+3 | 8 | 4+0 | 0 | 8+0 | 1 |
| 17 | MF | (Mexico) MEX | Amaury García | 8 | 0 | 0+3 | 0 | 0+3 | 0 | 0+0 | 0 | 1+1 | 0 |
| 18 | MF | (Argentina) ARG | Luka Romero | 23 | 3 | 0+0 | 0 | 8+9 | 2 | 0+0 | 0 | 2+4 | 1 |
| 19 | MF | (Mexico) MEX | Carlos Rodríguez | 52 | 1 | 18+3 | 0 | 18+2 | 0 | 3+1 | 0 | 6+1 | 1 |
| 21 | FW | (Uruguay) URU | Gabriel Fernández | 29 | 7 | 0+5 | 2 | 6+10 | 3 | 0+0 | 0 | 4+4 | 2 |
| 22 | DF | (Mexico) MEX | Raymundo Rubio | 0 | 0 | 0+0 | 0 | 0+0 | 0 | 0+0 | 0 | 0+0 | 0 |
| 23 | GK | (Colombia) COL | Kevin Mier | 52 | 0 | 21+0 | 0 | 20+0 | 0 | 4+0 | 0 | 7+0 | 0 |
| 26 | DF | (Mexico) MEX | Carlos Vargas | 5 | 0 | 0+3 | 0 | 0+2 | 0 | 0+0 | 0 | 0+0 | 0 |
| 29 | MF | (Argentina) ARG | Carlos Rotondi | 48 | 13 | 21+0 | 7 | 17+0 | 4 | 3+1 | 1 | 5+1 | 1 |
| 30 | GK | (Mexico) MEX | Emmanuel Ochoa | 0 | 0 | 0+0 | 0 | 0+0 | 0 | 0+0 | 0 | 0+0 | 0 |
| 32 | MF | (Mexico) MEX | Cristian Jiménez | 3 | 0 | 0+0 | 0 | 2+1 | 0 | 0+0 | 0 | 0+0 | 0 |
| 33 | DF | (Argentina) ARG | Gonzalo Piovi | 46 | 0 | 18+1 | 0 | 14+1 | 0 | 4+0 | 0 | 7+1 | 0 |
| 34 | MF | (Mexico) MEX | Leonardo Sámano | 0 | 0 | 0+0 | 0 | 0+0 | 0 | 0+0 | 0 | 0+0 | 0 |
| 35 | FW | (Mexico) MEX | Luis Gutiérrez | 2 | 0 | 0+0 | 0 | 0+1 | 0 | 0+0 | 0 | 0+1 | 0 |
| 193 | MF | (Mexico) MEX | Karol Velázquez (Note: Player registered with the under-23 team.) | 1 | 0 | 0+0 | 0 | 0+0 | 0 | 0+0 | 0 | 0+1 | 0 |
| 194 | MF | (Mexico) MEX | Amaury Morales | 31 | 2 | 1+10 | 2 | 3+11 | 0 | 0+0 | 0 | 1+5 | 0 |
| 196 | DF | (Venezuela) VEN | Javier Suárez | 1 | 0 | 0+0 | 0 | 0+0 | 0 | 0+0 | 0 | 0+1 | 0 |
| 205 | MF | (Mexico) MEX | Christian Valdivia | 2 | 0 | 0+1 | 0 | 0+0 | 0 | 0+0 | 0 | 0+1 | 0 |
| 210 | FW | (Mexico) MEX | Bryan Gamboa | 5 | 1 | 0+1 | 1 | 0+2 | 0 | 0+0 | 0 | 0+2 | 0 |
| 214 | FW | (Mexico) MEX | Mateo Levy | 7 | 0 | 2+5 | 0 | 0+0 | 0 | 0+0 | 0 | 0+0 | 0 |
| 250 | MF | (Mexico) MEX | Jeyson Durán (Note: Player registered with the under-19 team.) | 1 | 0 | 0+0 | 0 | 0+1 | 0 | 0+0 | 0 | 0+0 | 0 |
Player(s) who have made an appearance or had a squad number this season but have left the club:
| 7 | MF | (Mexico) MEX | Uriel Antuna | 9 | 1 | 2+3 | 0 | 0+0 | 0 | 1+3 | 1 | 0+0 | 0 |
| 12 | GK | (Mexico) MEX | Luis Jiménez | 0 | 0 | 0+0 | 0 | 0+0 | 0 | 0+0 | 0 | 0+0 | 0 |
| 13 | DF | (Uruguay) URU | Camilo Cándido | 16 | 0 | 1+11 | 0 | 0+0 | 0 | 1+3 | 0 | 0+0 | 0 |
| 18 | MF | (Mexico) MEX | Rodrigo Huescas | 1 | 0 | 1+0 | 0 | 0+0 | 0 | 0+0 | 0 | 0+0 | 0 |
| 27 | MF | (Mexico) MEX | Luis Romo | 24 | 0 | 16+4 | 0 | 0+0 | 0 | 4+0 | 0 | 0+0 | 0 |
| 31 | DF | (Mexico) MEX | Luis Iturbide | 0 | 0 | 0+0 | 0 | 0+0 | 0 | 0+0 | 0 | 0+0 | 0 |
| 200 | MF | (Mexico) MEX | Jorge García | 4 | 0 | 0+4 | 0 | 0+0 | 0 | 0+0 | 0 | 0+0 | 0 |

Last updated: 1 June 2025
Source: ESPN

=== Goals ===
As of 1 June 2025

| Rank | No. | Pos. | Player | Liga MX Apertura | Liga MX Clausura | Leagues Cup | Champions Cup | Total |
|---|---|---|---|---|---|---|---|---|
| 1 | 9 | FW | (Mexico) Ángel Sepúlveda | 10 | 4 | 0 | 9 | 23 |
| 2 | 15 | MF | (Uruguay) Ignacio Rivero | 7 | 8 | 0 | 1 | 16 |
| 3 | 29 | FW | (Argentina) Carlos Rotondi | 7 | 4 | 1 | 1 | 13 |
| 4 | 8 | MF | (Argentina) Lorenzo Faravelli | 5 | 3 | 0 | 1 | 9 |
| 4 | 11 | FW | (Greece) Giorgos Giakoumakis | 7 | 2 | 0 | 0 | 9 |
| 6 | 21 | FW | (Uruguay) Gabriel Fernández | 2 | 3 | 0 | 2 | 7 |
| 7 | 10 | MF | (Mexico) Andrés Montaño | 0 | 4 | 0 | 1 | 5 |
| 8 | 14 | MF | (Mexico) Alexis Gutiérrez | 3 | 0 | 0 | 0 | 3 |
| 8 | 18 | MF | (Argentina) Luka Romero | 0 | 2 | 0 | 1 | 3 |
| 10 | 7 | MF | (Poland) Mateusz Bogusz | 0 | 1 | 0 | 1 | 2 |
| 10 | 194 | MF | (Mexico) Amaury Morales (Note: Player registered with the under-23 team.) | 2 | 0 | 0 | 0 | 2 |
| 10 | 2 | DF | (Mexico) Jorge Sánchez | 1 | 0 | 0 | 1 | 2 |
| 13 | 7 | MF | (Mexico) Uriel Antuna | 0 | 0 | 1 | 0 | 1 |
| 13 | 4 | DF | (Colombia) Willer Ditta | 0 | 0 | 1 | 0 | 1 |
| 13 | 210 | FW | (Mexico) Bryan Gamboa | 1 | 0 | 0 | 0 | 1 |
| 13 | 6 | MF | (Mexico) Érik Lira | 0 | 1 | 0 | 0 | 1 |
| 13 | 19 | MF | (Mexico) Carlos Rodríguez | 0 | 0 | 0 | 1 | 1 |
| Own goals | | | | 0 | 1 | 0 | 1 | 2 |
| Total | | | | 45 | 33 | 3 | 20 | 101 |

=== Assists ===
| Rank | No. | Pos. | Player | Liga MX Apertura | Liga MX Clausura | Leagues Cup | Champions Cup | Total |
|---|---|---|---|---|---|---|---|---|
| 1 | 29 | FW | (Argentina) Carlos Rotondi | 4 | 5 | 0 | 3 | 12 |
| 2 | 11 | FW | (Greece) Giorgos Giakoumakis | 4 | 3 | 1 | 0 | 8 |
| 2 | 19 | MF | (Mexico) Carlos Rodríguez | 5 | 2 | 0 | 1 | 8 |
| 4 | 14 | MF | (Mexico) Alexis Gutiérrez | 3 | 2 | 1 | 0 | 6 |
| 4 | 27 | MF | (Mexico) Luis Romo | 6 | 0 | 0 | 0 | 6 |
| 6 | 7 | MF | (Poland) Mateusz Bogusz | 0 | 2 | 0 | 3 | 5 |
| 6 | 33 | DF | (Argentina) Gonzalo Piovi | 4 | 0 | 0 | 1 | 5 |
| 6 | 15 | MF | (Uruguay) Ignacio Rivero | 2 | 1 | 0 | 2 | 5 |
| 9 | 2 | DF | (Mexico) Jorge Sánchez | 2 | 1 | 0 | 1 | 4 |
| 9 | 9 | FW | (Mexico) Ángel Sepúlveda | 1 | 1 | 0 | 2 | 4 |
| 11 | 194 | MF | (Mexico) Amaury Morales (Note: Player registered with the under-23 team.) | 0 | 3 | 0 | 0 | 3 |
| 12 | 21 | FW | (Uruguay) Gabriel Fernández | 1 | 1 | 0 | 0 | 2 |
| 12 | 10 | MF | (Mexico) Andrés Montaño | 0 | 1 | 1 | 0 | 2 |
| 14 | 4 | DF | (Colombia) Willer Ditta | 0 | 1 | 0 | 0 | 1 |
| 14 | 8 | MF | (Argentina) Lorenzo Faravelli | 1 | 0 | 0 | 0 | 1 |
| 14 | 18 | MF | (Argentina) Luka Romero | 0 | 1 | 0 | 0 | 1 |
| 14 | 196 | DF | (Venezuela) Javier Suárez | 0 | 0 | 0 | 1 | 1 |
| Total | | | | 31 | 24 | 3 | 14 | 72 |

=== Clean sheets ===
| No. | Player | Liga MX Apertura | Liga MX Clausura | Leagues Cup | Champions Cup | Total |
|---|---|---|---|---|---|---|
| 1 | (Mexico) Andrés Gudiño | 0 | 0 | 0 | 2 | 2 |
| 23 | (Colombia) Kevin Mier | 11 | 6 | 2 | 4 | 23 |
| Total | | 11 | 6 | 2 | 6 | 25 |

=== Disciplinary record ===
| No. | Pos. | Player | Liga MX Apertura | | | Liga MX Clausura | | | Leagues Cup | | | Champions Cup | | | Total | | |
| No. | Pos. | Player | Yellow card | (yellow card) (yellow-red card) | Red card | Yellow card | (yellow card) (yellow-red card) | Red card | Yellow card | (yellow card) (yellow-red card) | Red card | Yellow card | (yellow card) (yellow-red card) | Red card | Yellow card | (yellow card) (yellow-red card) | Red card |
|---|---|---|---|---|---|---|---|---|---|---|---|---|---|---|---|---|---|
| 2 | DF | (Mexico) Jorge Sánchez | 3 | 0 | 1 | 1 | 0 | 0 | 0 | 0 | 0 | 1 | 0 | 0 | 5 | 0 | 1 |
| 4 | DF | (Colombia) Willer Ditta | 5 | 0 | 0 | 6 | 0 | 0 | 1 | 0 | 0 | 1 | 0 | 0 | 13 | 0 | 0 |
| 5 | DF | (Mexico) Jesús Orozco | 0 | 0 | 0 | 6 | 0 | 0 | 0 | 0 | 0 | 0 | 0 | 0 | 6 | 0 | 0 |
| 6 | MF | (Mexico) Érik Lira | 2 | 0 | 0 | 4 | 0 | 0 | 0 | 0 | 0 | 1 | 0 | 0 | 7 | 0 | 0 |
| 7 | MF | (Poland) Mateusz Bogusz | 0 | 0 | 0 | 2 | 0 | 0 | 0 | 0 | 0 | 1 | 0 | 0 | 3 | 0 | 0 |
| 8 | MF | (Argentina) Lorenzo Faravelli | 4 | 0 | 0 | 5 | 0 | 0 | 0 | 0 | 0 | 3 | 0 | 0 | 12 | 0 | 0 |
| 9 | FW | (Mexico) Ángel Sepúlveda | 2 | 0 | 0 | 2 | 0 | 0 | 0 | 0 | 0 | 2 | 0 | 0 | 6 | 0 | 0 |
| 10 | MF | (Mexico) Andrés Montaño | 0 | 0 | 0 | 1 | 0 | 0 | 0 | 0 | 0 | 0 | 0 | 0 | 1 | 0 | 0 |
| 11 | FW | (Greece) Giorgos Giakoumakis | 3 | 0 | 0 | 5 | 0 | 0 | 0 | 0 | 0 | 0 | 0 | 0 | 8 | 0 | 0 |
| 13 | DF | (Uruguay) Camilo Cándido | 0 | 0 | 1 | 0 | 0 | 0 | 0 | 0 | 0 | 0 | 0 | 0 | 0 | 0 | 1 |
| 15 | MF | (Uruguay) Ignacio Rivero | 4 | 0 | 0 | 2 | 0 | 1 | 0 | 0 | 0 | 2 | 0 | 0 | 8 | 0 | 1 |
| 17 | MF | (Mexico) Amaury García | 1 | 0 | 0 | 0 | 0 | 0 | 0 | 0 | 0 | 1 | 0 | 0 | 2 | 0 | 0 |
| 18 | MF | (Argentina) Luka Romero | 0 | 0 | 0 | 1 | 0 | 0 | 0 | 0 | 0 | 0 | 0 | 0 | 1 | 0 | 0 |
| 19 | MF | (Mexico) Carlos Rodríguez | 3 | 0 | 0 | 3 | 0 | 0 | 0 | 0 | 0 | 1 | 0 | 0 | 7 | 0 | 0 |
| 21 | FW | (Uruguay) Gabriel Fernández | 0 | 0 | 0 | 1 | 0 | 0 | 0 | 0 | 0 | 1 | 0 | 0 | 2 | 0 | 0 |
| 23 | GK | (Colombia) Kevin Mier | 1 | 0 | 0 | 0 | 0 | 0 | 0 | 0 | 0 | 0 | 0 | 0 | 1 | 0 | 0 |
| 27 | MF | (Mexico) Luis Romo | 2 | 0 | 0 | 0 | 0 | 0 | 1 | 0 | 0 | 0 | 0 | 0 | 3 | 0 | 0 |
| 29 | MF | (Argentina) Carlos Rotondi | 2 | 0 | 0 | 3 | 0 | 0 | 2 | 0 | 0 | 1 | 0 | 0 | 8 | 0 | 0 |
| 33 | DF | (Argentina) Gonzalo Piovi | 6 | 0 | 1 | 4 | 0 | 1 | 2 | 1 | 0 | 1 | 0 | 0 | 13 | 1 | 2 |
| 32 | MF | (Mexico) Cristian Jiménez | 0 | 0 | 0 | 1 | 0 | 0 | 0 | 0 | 0 | 0 | 0 | 0 | 1 | 0 | 0 |
| 194 | MF | (Mexico) Amaury Morales (Note: Player registered with the under-23 team.) | 2 | 0 | 0 | 0 | 0 | 0 | 1 | 0 | 0 | 0 | 0 | 0 | 2 | 0 | 0 |
| 200 | MF | (Mexico) Jorge García | 1 | 0 | 0 | 0 | 0 | 0 | 1 | 0 | 0 | 0 | 0 | 0 | 1 | 0 | 0 |
| Total | | | 41 | 0 | 3 | 47 | 0 | 2 | 6 | 1 | 0 | 16 | 0 | 0 | 110 | 1 | 5 |

== Awards ==
=== Liga MX Player of the Month ===
| Month | Player | Ref. |
|---|---|---|
| September | (Argentina) Carlos Rotondi | |
| October | (Mexico) Ángel Sepúlveda | |
| November | (Mexico) Jorge Sánchez | |

=== Liga MX Goal of the Month ===
| Month | Player | Ref. |
|---|---|---|
| September | (Argentina) Lorenzo Faravelli | |
| November | (Mexico) Jorge Sánchez | |

=== Liga MX Save of the Month ===
| Month | Player | Ref. |
|---|---|---|
| September | (Colombia) Kevin Mier | |
