= 2024–25 in Mexican football =

111th competitive association football season in Mexico

Football in Mexico
- Season: 2024–25

Men's football
- Liga MX: Apertura: América; Clausura: Toluca
- Liga de Expansión MX: Apertura: Tapatío; Clausura: UdeG
- Liga Premier (Serie A) Liga Premier (Serie B): Apertura: Aguacateros de Peribán; Clausura: Irapuato; Apertura: Santiago; Clausura: Santiago
- Supercopa de la Liga MX: América

Women's football
- Liga MX Femenil: Apertura: Monterrey; Clausura: Pachuca

The 2024–25 season is the 111th competitive association football season in Mexico.

At the international, confederation level, qualifying Liga MX clubs will compete in the 2025 CONCACAF Champions Cup, and qualifying Liga MX Femenil clubs will compete in the inaugural 2024–25 CONCACAF W Champions Cup.

== National teams ==
=== Mexico national football team ===
==== Friendlies ====
7 September 2024	Mexico	3–0	New Zealand	Pasadena, United States
18:00 PDT	Pineda 5'; Huerta 53'; Romo 57'	Report		Stadium: Rose Bowl; Attendance: 25,271; Referee: Joseph Dickerson (United States)

10 September 2024	Mexico	0–0	Canada	Arlington, United States
20:00 CST		Report		Stadium: AT&T Stadium; Attendance: 32,623; Referee: Victor Rivas (United States)

12 October 2024	Mexico	2–2	(Spain) Valencia	Puebla, Mexico
20:00 CST	Vega 8'; Herrera 33'	Report	Gómez 43', 62'	Stadium: Estadio Cuauhtémoc; Referee: Juan Calderón (Costa Rica)

15 October 2024	Mexico	2–0	United States	Zapopan, Mexico
20:30 CST	Jiménez 22'; Huerta 49'	Report		Stadium: Estadio Akron; Attendance: 43,537; Referee: Keylor Herrera (Costa Rica)

16 January 2025	Internacional (Brazil)	0–2	Mexico	Porto Alegre, Brazil
15:00 UTC−3		Report	Lira 34'; Ruvalcaba 45+1'	Stadium: Estádio Beira-Rio; Referee: Rafael Rodrigo Klein (Brazil)

21 January 2025	River Plate (Argentina)	2–0	Mexico	Buenos Aires, Argentina
15:00 UTC−3	Galoppo 7'; Borja 33'	Report		Stadium: Estadio Monumental; Referee: Sebastián Nicolás Martínez (Argentina)

7 June 2025	Mexico	2–4	Switzerland	Salt Lake City, United States
14:00 UTC−6	Giménez 51'; Sepúlveda 75'	Report	Embolo 20'; Amdouni 64'; Ndoye 71'; Rieder 90'	Stadium: Rice–Eccles Stadium; Attendance: 41,508; Referee: Victor Rivas (United States)

10 June 2025	Mexico	1–0	Turkey	Chapel Hill, United States
20:30 UTC−4	Pineda 45'	Report		Stadium: Kenan Stadium; Referee: Moeth Gaymes (Saint Vincent and the Grenadines)

==== 2024–25 CONCACAF Nations League ====
===== Quarter-finals =====
Team 1	Agg.	Team 2	1st leg	2nd leg
Honduras	2–4	Mexico	2–0	0–4

15 November 2024 Nations League QF First leg	Honduras	2–0	Mexico	San Pedro Sula, Honduras
20:00 UTC−6	Palma 64', 83'	Report		Stadium: Estadio Francisco Morazán; Attendance: 12,866; Referee: Walter López (Guatemala)

19 November 2024 Nations League QF Second leg	Mexico	4–0 (4–2 agg.)	Honduras	Toluca, Mexico
20:30 UTC−6	Jiménez 42'; Martín 72', 90+7' (pen.); Sánchez 85'	Report		Stadium: Estadio Nemesio Díez; Attendance: 26,898; Referee: Drew Fischer (Canada)

===== Finals =====
2024–25 CONCACAF Nations League SF	Canada	0–2	Mexico	SoFi Stadium, Inglewood
22:30 (19:30 UTC−7)		Report	Jiménez 1', 75'	Attendance: 50,295; Referee: Saíd Martínez (Honduras)

====== Final ======
23 March 2025
21:30 (18:30 UTC−7)

Mexico	2–1	Panama
Jiménez 8', 90+2' (pen.)	Report	Carrasquilla 45+2' (pen.)

SoFi Stadium, Inglewood
Attendance: 68,212
Referee: Mario Escobar (Guatemala)

== CONCACAF competitions ==
=== CONCACAF Champions Cup ===
==== Round one ====
===== Cruz Azul =====
Team 1	Agg.	Team 2	1st leg	2nd leg
Real Hope (Haiti)	0–7	(Mexico) Cruz Azul	0–2	0–5

===== Guadalajara =====
Team 1	Agg.	Team 2	1st leg	2nd leg
Cibao (Dominican Republic)	1–4	(Mexico) Guadalajara	1–1	0–3

===== Monterrey =====
Team 1	Agg.	Team 2	1st leg	2nd leg
Forge FC (Canada)	0–5	(Mexico) Monterrey	0–2	0–3

===== Pumas UNAM =====
Team 1	Agg.	Team 2	1st leg	2nd leg
Cavalry FC (Canada)	2–3	(Mexico) UNAM	2–1	0–2

===== Tigres UANL =====
Team 1	Agg.	Team 2	1st leg	2nd leg
Real Estelí (Nicaragua)	1–3	(Mexico) UANL	1–0	0–3

==== Round of 16 ====
Team 1	Agg.	Team 2	1st leg	2nd leg
Vancouver Whitecaps FC (Canada)	3–3 (a)	(Mexico) Monterrey	1–1	2–2
UNAM (Mexico)	3–1	(Costa Rica) Alajuelense	2–0	1–1
Guadalajara (Mexico)	1–4	(Mexico) América	1–0	0–4
Seattle Sounders FC (United States)	1–4	(Mexico) Cruz Azul	0–0	1–4
FC Cincinnati (United States)	2–4	(Mexico) UANL	1–1	1–3

==== Quarter-finals ====
Team 1	Agg.	Team 2	1st leg	2nd leg
Vancouver Whitecaps FC (Canada)	3–3 (a)	(Mexico) UNAM	1–1	2–2
América (Mexico)	1–2	(Mexico) Cruz Azul	0–0	1–2
LA Galaxy (United States)	2–3	(Mexico) UANL	0–0	2–3

==== Semi-finals ====
Team 1	Agg.	Team 2	1st leg	2nd leg
Vancouver Whitecaps FC (Canada)	5–1	(United States) Inter Miami CF	2–0	3–1
UANL (Mexico)	1–2	(Mexico) Cruz Azul	1–1	0–1

==== Final ====
1 June 2025
21:00 (19:00 UTC−6)

Cruz Azul (Mexico)	5–0	(Canada) Vancouver Whitecaps FC
Rivero 8'; Faravelli 28'; Sepúlveda 37', 50'; Bogusz 45'	Report

Estadio Olímpico Universitario, Mexico City
Attendance: 33,046
Referee: Walter López (Guatemala)

== Men's football ==
=== Liga MX ===
==== Apertura 2024 ====
===== Regular phase =====
====== League table ======
Pos	Team	Pld	W	D	L	GF	GA	GD	Pts	Qualification
1	Cruz Azul	17	13	3	1	39	12	+27	42	Qualification for the quarter–finals (Note: The first six places in the table qualifed for the Liguilla quarter-finals.)
2	Toluca	17	10	5	2	38	16	+22	35	Qualification for the quarter–finals
3	Tigres UANL	17	10	4	3	25	15	+10	34	Qualification for the quarter–finals
4	Pumas UNAM	17	9	4	4	21	13	+8	31	Qualification for the quarter–finals
5	Monterrey	17	9	4	4	26	19	+7	31	Qualification for the quarter–finals
6	Atlético San Luis	17	9	3	5	27	19	+8	30	Qualification for the quarter–finals
7	Tijuana	17	8	5	4	24	25	−1	29	Qualification for the play-in round (Note: Teams ranked 7th to 10th qualified for the play-in round.)
8	América (C)	17	8	3	6	27	21	+6	27	Qualification for the play-in round
9	Guadalajara	17	7	4	6	24	15	+9	25	Qualification for the play-in round
10	Atlas	17	5	7	5	17	23	−6	22	Qualification for the play-in round
11	León	17	3	9	5	21	23	−2	18	
12	Juárez	17	5	2	10	22	36	−14	17	
13	Necaxa	17	3	6	8	20	26	−6	15	
14	Mazatlán	17	2	8	7	10	19	−9	14	
15	Puebla	17	4	2	11	17	31	−14	14	
16	Pachuca	17	3	4	10	20	29	−9	13	
17	Querétaro	17	3	3	11	13	31	−18	12	
18	Santos Laguna	17	2	4	11	12	30	−18	10	

Source: Liga MX
Rules for classification: 1) Points; 2) Goal difference; 3) Number of goals scored; 4) Head-to-head results between tied teams; 5) Number of goals scored away; 6) Highest relegation coefficient; 7) Fair Play points
(C) Champions

===== Final phase =====
====== Play-in round ======
The 9th place team hosts the 10th place team in an elimination game. The 7th hosts the 8th place team in the double-chance game, with the winner advancing as the 7-seed. The loser of this game then hosts the winner of the elimination game between the 9th and 10th place teams to determine the 8-seed.

Play-in games
Serie A
7	Tijuana	2 (2)
8	América	2 (3)
Serie B
9	Guadalajara	1
10	Atlas	2

No. 8 seed game
7	Tijuana	3
10	Atlas	0

Final seeds
8	América	No. 7 seed
7	Tijuana	No. 8 seed

====== Play-in matches ======
Team 1	Score	Team 2
Tijuana	2–2 (2–3 p)	América
Guadalajara	1–2	Atlas

Team 1	Score	Team 2
Tijuana	3–0	Atlas

====== Bracket ======
Quarter-finals
4	UNAM	0	3	3
5	Monterrey	1	5	6
3	UANL	0	0	0
6	Atlético San Luis	3	0	3
1	Cruz Azul (s)	0	3	3
8	Tijuana	3	0	3
2	Toluca	0	0	0
7	América	2	2	4

Semi-finals
5	Monterrey	1	5	6
6	Atlético San Luis	2	1	3
1	Cruz Azul	0	3	3
7	América	0	4	4

Finals
5	Monterrey	1	1	2
7	América	2	1	3

====== Quarterfinals ======
Team 1	Agg.	Team 2	1st leg	2nd leg
Tijuana	3–3 (s)	Cruz Azul	3–0	0–3
América	4–0	Toluca	2–0	2–0
Atlético San Luis	3–0	UANL	3–0	0–0
Monterrey	6–3	UNAM	1–0	5–3

====== Semifinals ======
Team 1	Agg.	Team 2	1st leg	2nd leg
América	4–3	Cruz Azul	0–0	4–3
Atlético San Luis	3–6	Monterrey	2–1	1–5

====== Finals ======
Team 1	Agg.	Team 2	1st leg	2nd leg
América	3–2	Monterrey	2–1	1–1

12 December 2024
20:00 CST (UTC−6)

América	2–1	Monterrey
Álvarez 39'; Zendejas 49'	Report	Canales 35'

Estadio Cuauhtémoc, Puebla
Attendance: 36,933
Referee: Víctor Alfonso Cáceres (Chiapas)
15 December 2024
19:00 CST (UTC−6)

Monterrey	1–1	América
Rojas 85'	Report	R. Sánchez 24'

Estadio BBVA, Guadalupe
Attendance: 52,127
Referee: César Arturo Ramos (Sinaloa)

América won 3–2 on aggregate.

==== Clausura 2025 ====
===== Regular phase =====
====== League table ======
Pos	Team	Pld	W	D	L	GF	GA	GD	Pts	Qualification
1	Toluca (C)	17	11	4	2	41	22	+19	37	Qualification for the quarter–finals (Note: The first six places in the table qualified for the Liguilla quarter-finals.)
2	América	17	10	4	3	34	10	+24	34	Qualification for the quarter–finals
3	Cruz Azul	17	9	6	2	26	16	+10	33	Qualification for the quarter–finals
4	Tigres UANL	17	10	3	4	24	14	+10	33	Qualification for the quarter–finals
5	Necaxa	17	10	1	6	36	29	+7	31	Qualification for the quarter–finals
6	León	17	9	3	5	24	21	+3	30	Qualification for the quarter–finals
7	Monterrey	17	8	4	5	32	23	+9	28	Qualification for the play-in round (Note: Teams ranked 7th to 10th qualified for the play-in round.)
8	Pachuca	17	8	4	5	29	23	+6	28	Qualification for the play-in round
9	Juárez	17	6	6	5	16	21	−5	24	Qualification for the play-in round
10	Pumas UNAM	17	6	3	8	23	26	−3	21	Qualification for the play-in round
11	Guadalajara	17	5	6	6	18	21	−3	21	
12	Querétaro	17	6	2	9	17	24	−7	20	
13	Tijuana	17	6	1	10	29	35	−6	19	
14	Atlas	17	4	6	7	25	32	−7	18	
15	Atlético San Luis	17	6	0	11	20	33	−13	18	
16	Mazatlán	17	4	5	8	16	26	−10	17	Team ended last place in the coefficient table (Note: Team ranked last in the coefficient table was ineligible for the final phase.)
17	Puebla	17	2	3	12	12	25	−13	9	
18	Santos Laguna	17	2	1	14	15	36	−21	7	

Source: Liga MX
Rules for classification: 1) Points; 2) Goal difference; 3) Number of goals scored; 4) Head-to-head results between tied teams; 5) Number of goals scored away; 6) Highest relegation coefficient; 7) Fair Play points
(C) Champions

===== Final phase =====
====== Play-in round ======
The 9th place team hosts the 10th place team in an elimination game. The 7th hosts the 8th place team in the double-chance game, with the winner advancing as the 7-seed. The loser of this game then hosts the winner of the elimination game between the 9th and 10th place teams to determine the 8-seed.

Play-in games
Serie A
7	Monterrey	1
8	Pachuca	2
Serie B
9	Juárez	1 (1)
10	UNAM	1 (2)

No. 8 seed game
7	Monterrey	2
10	UNAM	0

Final seeds
8	Pachuca	No. 7 seed
7	Monterrey	No. 8 seed

====== Play-in matches ======
Team 1	Score	Team 2
Monterrey	1–2	Pachuca
Juárez	1–1 (1–2 p)	UNAM

Team 1	Score	Team 2
Monterrey	2–0	UNAM

====== Bracket ======
Quarter-finals
1	Toluca (s)	2	2	4
8	Monterrey	3	1	4
4	UANL (s)	0	2	2
5	Necaxa	0	2	2
2	América	0	2	2
7	Pachuca	0	0	0
3	Cruz Azul	3	2	5
6	León	2	1	3

Semi-finals
1	Toluca	1	3	4
4	UANL	1	0	1
2	América (s)	0	2	2
3	Cruz Azul	1	1	2

Finals
1	Toluca	0	2	2
2	América	0	0	0

====== Quarterfinals ======
Team 1	Agg.	Team 2	1st leg	2nd leg
Monterrey	4–4 (s)	Toluca	3–2	1–2
Pachuca	0–2	América	0–0	0–2
León	3–5	Cruz Azul	2–3	1–2
Necaxa	2–2 (s)	UANL	0–0	2–2

====== Semifinals ======
Team 1	Agg.	Team 2	1st leg	2nd leg
UANL	1–4	Toluca	1–1	0–3
Cruz Azul	2–2 (s)	América	1–0	1–2

====== Finals ======
Team 1	Agg.	Team 2	1st leg	2nd leg
América	0–2	Toluca	0–0	0–2

22 May 2025
20:00 CST (UTC−6)

América	0–0	Toluca
	Report

Estadio Ciudad de los Deportes, Mexico City
Attendance: 30,406
Referee: Daniel Quintero Huitrón (Jalisco)
25 May 2025
19:00 CST (UTC−6)

Toluca	2–0	América
Luan 65'; Vega 82' (pen.)	Report

Estadio Nemesio Díez, Toluca
Attendance: 27,273
Referee: César Arturo Ramos (Sinaloa)

Toluca won 2–0 on aggregate.

=== Cup competitions ===
==== Supercopa de la Liga MX ====
30 June 2024
13:30 PDT

América	2–1	Tigres
Dilrosun 24'; Martín 35'	Report	Brunetta 7'

Dignity Health Sports Park, Carson
Attendance: 26,791
Referee: Ismael Rosario López (Sinaloa)

==== Leagues Cup ====
===== Group Stage =====
====== East ======
East 1
East 2
East 3

Pos	Team	Pld	Pts
1	(United States Soccer Federation) FC Cincinnati	2	6
2	(United States Soccer Federation) New York City FC	2	2
3	(Mexican Football Federation) Querétaro	2	1

Source: Leagues Cup

Pos	Team	Pld	Pts
1	(United States Soccer Federation) Orlando City SC	2	5
2	(Canadian Soccer Association) CF Montréal	2	3
3	(Mexican Football Federation) Atlético San Luis	2	1

Source: Leagues Cup

Pos	Team	Pld	Pts
1	(Mexican Football Federation) UANL	2	6
2	(United States Soccer Federation) Inter Miami CF	2	3
3	(Mexican Football Federation) Puebla	2	0

Source: Leagues Cup
East 4
East 5
East 6

Pos	Team	Pld	Pts
1	(United States Soccer Federation) Philadelphia Union	2	4
2	(Mexican Football Federation) Cruz Azul	2	3
3	(United States Soccer Federation) Charlotte FC	2	2

Source: Leagues Cup

Pos	Team	Pld	Pts
1	(United States Soccer Federation) New England Revolution	2	5
2	(Mexican Football Federation) Mazatlán	2	3
3	(United States Soccer Federation) Nashville SC	2	1

Source: Leagues Cup

Pos	Team	Pld	Pts
1	(Canadian Soccer Association) Toronto FC	2	5
2	(Mexican Football Federation) Pachuca	2	2
3	(United States Soccer Federation) New York Red Bulls	2	2

Source: Leagues Cup
East 7

Pos	Team	Pld	Pts
1	(United States Soccer Federation) D.C. United	2	5
2	(Mexican Football Federation) Santos Laguna	2	2
3	(United States Soccer Federation) Atlanta United FC	2	2

Source: Leagues Cup

====== West ======
West 1
West 2
West 3

Pos	Team	Pld	Pts
1	(United States Soccer Federation) Austin FC	2	6
2	(Mexican Football Federation) UNAM	2	2
3	(Mexican Football Federation) Monterrey	2	1

Source: Leagues Cup

Pos	Team	Pld	Pts
1	(United States Soccer Federation) LA Galaxy	2	5
2	(United States Soccer Federation) San Jose Earthquakes	2	2
3	(Mexican Football Federation) Guadalajara	2	2

Source: Leagues Cup

Pos	Team	Pld	Pts
1	(Mexican Football Federation) Juárez	2	5
2	(United States Soccer Federation) St. Louis City SC	2	4
3	(United States Soccer Federation) FC Dallas	2	0

Source: Leagues Cup
West 4
West 5
West 6

Pos	Team	Pld	Pts
1	(Mexican Football Federation) Toluca	2	6
2	(United States Soccer Federation) Sporting Kansas City	2	3
3	(United States Soccer Federation) Chicago Fire FC	2	0

Source: Leagues Cup

Pos	Team	Pld	Pts
1	(United States Soccer Federation) Portland Timbers	2	6
2	(United States Soccer Federation) Colorado Rapids	2	2
3	(Mexican Football Federation) León	2	1

Source: Leagues Cup

Pos	Team	Pld	Pts
1	(Mexican Football Federation) Necaxa	2	3
2	(United States Soccer Federation) Seattle Sounders FC	2	3
3	(United States Soccer Federation) Minnesota United FC	2	3

Source: Leagues Cup
West 7
West 8

Pos	Team	Pld	Pts
1	(Canadian Soccer Association) Vancouver Whitecaps FC	2	5
2	(United States Soccer Federation) Los Angeles FC	2	4
3	(Mexican Football Federation) Tijuana	2	0

Source: Leagues Cup

Pos	Team	Pld	Pts
1	(United States Soccer Federation) Houston Dynamo FC	2	3
2	(Mexican Football Federation) Atlas	2	3
3	(United States Soccer Federation) Real Salt Lake	2	3

Source: Leagues Cup

===== Round of 32 =====
Home team	Score	Away team
Vancouver Whitecaps FC (Canada)	0–2	(Mexico) UNAM
UANL (Mexico)	1–0	(Mexico) Pachuca
San Jose Earthquakes (United States)	5–0	(Mexico) Necaxa
FC Cincinnati (United States)	1–1 (6–5 p)	(Mexico) Santos Laguna
D.C. United (United States)	1–2	(Mexico) Mazatlán
Orlando City SC (United States)	0–0 (4–5 p)	(Mexico) Cruz Azul
Toluca (Mexico)	2–2 (5–4 p)	(United States) Houston Dynamo FC
Juárez (Mexico)	2 3	(United States) Colorado Rapids
América (Mexico)	2–1	(Mexico) Atlas

===== Round of 16 =====
Home team	Score	Away team
Seattle Sounders FC (United States)	4–0	(Mexico) UNAM
Cruz Azul (Mexico)	2–2 (1–3 p)	(Mexico) Mazatlán
UANL (Mexico)	1–2	(United States) New York City FC
Toluca (Mexico)	1–2	(United States) Colorado Rapids
América (Mexico)	4–2	(United States) St. Louis City SC

===== Quarter-finals =====
Home team	Score	Away team
Philadelphia Union (United States)	1–1 (4–3 p)	(Mexico) Mazatlán
América (Mexico)	0–0 (8–9 p)	(United States) Colorado Rapids

=== Campeones Cup ===
September 25, 2024
7:30 p.m. EDT (UTC−4)

Columbus Crew (United States Soccer Federation)	1–1	(Mexican Football Federation) América
Amundsen 77'	Report	Dávila 68'
Penalties
Camacho (penalty scored); Mățan (penalty missed); Russell-Rowe (penalty scored); Hernández (penalty scored); Jones (penalty scored); Jackson (penalty missed); Amundsen (penalty missed)	4–5	(penalty scored) Valdés; (penalty missed) R. Sánchez; (penalty scored) Aguirre; (penalty scored) Fidalgo; (penalty scored) Dávila; (penalty missed) Juárez; (penalty scored) Araujo

Lower.com Field, Columbus, Ohio
Attendance: 20,198
Referee: Walter López (Guatemala)
