= Andrés Montaño =

Andrés Montaño may refer to:

- Andrés Montaño (wrestler) (born 1990), Ecuadorian Greco-Roman wrestler
- Andrés Montaño (footballer) (born 2002), Mexican footballer
