= Apertura 2024 Liga MX final phase =

Tournament details
- Dates: 20 November – 15 December 2024
- Teams: 10

Tournament statistics
- Matches played: 17
- Goals scored: 53 (3.12 per match)
- Attendance: 548,382 (32,258 per match)

The Apertura 2024 Liga MX final phase was played between 20 November and 15 December 2024. A total of ten teams will compete in the final phase to decide the champions of the Apertura 2024 Liga MX season.

For the third straight season, the number of clubs qualifying for the quarter-finals will be six while the teams qualifying for the reclassification is four. The four clubs qualified for the reclassification competed in the "play-in" round, a tournament modeled after the NBA play-in tournament.

América defeated Monterrey 3–2 on aggregate to win their third straight title and sixteenth overall. As winners, América will face the Clausura 2025 champion at the 2025 Campeón de Campeones.

== Qualified teams ==
The following teams qualified for the championship stage.

In the following tables, the number of appearances, last appearance, and previous best result count only those in the short tournament era starting from Invierno 1996 (not counting those in the long tournament era from 1943–44 to 1995–96).

Qualified directly to quarter-finals (6 teams)
Seed	Team	Points (GD)	Date of qualification	Appearance	Last appearance	Previous best (last)	Ref.
1	Cruz Azul	42	18 October 2024 (PLAY); 23 October 2024 (QF)	36th	Clausura 2024	Champions (Gua. 2021)	
2	Toluca	35	22 October 2024 (PLAY); 2 November 2024 (QF)	39th	Clausura 2024	Champions (Bic. 2010)	
3	UANL	34	26 October 2024 (PLAY); 6 November 2024 (QF)	34th	Clausura 2024	Champions (Cl. 2023)	
4	UNAM	31	2 November 2024 (PLAY); 8 November 2024 (QF)	27th	Clausura 2024	Champions (Cl. 2011)	
5	Monterrey	31	2 November 2024 (PLAY); 10 November 2024 (QF)	30th	Clausura 2024	Champions (Ap. 2019)	
6	Atlético San Luis	30	2 November 2024 (PLAY); 9 November 2024 (QF)	5th	Apertura 2023	Semi-finals (Ap. 2023)	

Qualified to play-in round (4 teams)
Seed	Team	Points (GD)	Date of qualification	Appearance	Last appearance	Previous best (last)	Ref
7	Tijuana	29	2 November 2024	8th	Clausura 2019	Champions (Ap. 2012)	
8	América	27	2 November 2024	40th	Clausura 2024	Champions (Cl. 2024)	
9	Guadalajara	25	5 November 2024	33rd	Clausura 2024	Champions (Cl. 2017)	
10	Atlas	21	10 November 2024	26th	Clausura 2023	Champions (Cl. 2022)	

== Play-in round ==
=== Format ===
The 9th place team hosts the 10th place team in an elimination game. The 7th hosts the 8th place team in the double-chance game, with the winner advancing as the 7-seed. The loser of this game then hosts the winner of the elimination game between the 9th and 10th place teams to determine the 8-seed.

=== Bracket ===
Play-in games
Serie A
7	Tijuana	2 (2)
8	América	2 (3)
Serie B
9	Guadalajara	1
10	Atlas	2

No. 8 seed game
7	Tijuana	3
10	Atlas	0

Final seeds
8	América	No. 7 seed
7	Tijuana	No. 8 seed

=== Play-in matches ===
Team 1	Score	Team 2
Tijuana	2–2 (2–3 p)	América
Guadalajara	1–2	Atlas

==== Serie A ====
21 November 2024
19:00 PST (UTC−8)

Tijuana	2–2	América
Bilbao 15'; Zúñiga 53'	Report	B. Rodríguez 51'; Borja 90+1'
Penalties
Rivera (penalty missed); Reynoso (penalty missed); Bilbao (penalty scored); Gómez (penalty scored); Mejía (penalty missed)	2–3	(penalty scored) B. Rodríguez; (penalty scored) Reyes; (penalty missed) Zendejas; (penalty missed) Fidalgo; (penalty scored) Aguirre

Estadio Caliente, Tijuana
Attendance: 29,333
Referee: Adonai Escobedo González (Aguascalientes)

==== Serie B ====
21 November 2024
19:05 CST (UTC−6)

Guadalajara	1–2	Atlas
Guzmán 59'	Report	Castillo 85' (o.g.); Rocha 90+14' (pen.)

Estadio Akron, Zapopan
Attendance: 40,645
Referee: César Arturo Ramos (Sinaloa)

=== No. 8 seed match ===
Team 1	Score	Team 2
Tijuana	3–0	Atlas

24 November 2024
19:00 PST (UTC−8)

Tijuana	3–0	Atlas
Zúñiga 4', 20'; Castañeda 84'	Report

Estadio Caliente, Tijuana
Attendance: 17,333
Referee: Víctor Alfonso Cáceres (Chiapas)

== Bracket ==
Quarter-finals
4	UNAM	0	3	3
5	Monterrey	1	5	6
3	UANL	0	0	0
6	Atlético San Luis	3	0	3
1	Cruz Azul (s)	0	3	3
8	Tijuana	3	0	3
2	Toluca	0	0	0
7	América	2	2	4

Semi-finals
5	Monterrey	1	5	6
6	Atlético San Luis	2	1	3
1	Cruz Azul	0	3	3
7	América	0	4	4

Finals
5	Monterrey	1	1	2
7	América	2	1	3

== Quarter-finals ==
=== Summary ===
The first legs will be played on 27–28 November 2024, and the second legs will be played on 30 November–1 December 2024.

Team 1	Agg.	Team 2	1st leg	2nd leg
Tijuana	3–3 (s)	Cruz Azul	3–0	0–3
América	4–0	Toluca	2–0	2–0
Atlético San Luis	3–0	UANL	3–0	0–0
Monterrey	6–3	UNAM	1–0	5–3

=== Matches ===
27 November 2024
19:00 PST (UTC−8)

Tijuana	3–0	Cruz Azul
Zúñiga 10'; Álvarez 19'; Reynoso 42'	Report

Estadio Caliente, Tijuana
Attendance: 25,333
Referee: Fernando Hernández Gómez (Mexico City)
30 November 2024
19:10 CST (UTC−6)

Cruz Azul	3–0	Tijuana
Rivero 44'; Giakoumakis 54'; Sepúlveda 74'	Report

Estadio Ciudad de los Deportes, Mexico City
Attendance: 24,975
Referee: Víctor Alfonso Cáceres (Chiapas)

3–3 on aggregate. Cruz Azul advanced due to being the higher seeded team.

27 November 2024
19:00 CST (UTC−6)

América	2–0	Toluca
Aguirre 67', 82'	Report

Estadio Ciudad de los Deportes, Mexico City
Attendance: 27,025
Referee: Óscar Mejía García (Mexico City)
30 November 2024
17:00 CST (UTC−6)

Toluca	0–2	América
	Report	Ruiz 49' (o.g.); Martín 72'

Estadio Nemesio Díez, Toluca
Attendance: 27,273
Referee: César Arturo Ramos (Sinaloa)

América won 4–0 on aggregate.

28 November 2024
19:00 CST (UTC−6)

Atlético San Luis	3–0	UANL
Joaquim 30' (o.g.); Bonatini 60'; Vitinho 64'	Report

Estadio Alfonso Lastras, San Luis Potosí
Attendance: 22,102
Referee: Jesus Rafael Lopez (Sinaloa)
1 December 2024
19:00 CST (UTC−6)

UANL	0–0	Atlético San Luis
	Report

Estadio Universitario, San Nicolás de los Garza
Attendance: 40,271
Referee: Adonai Escobedo González (Aguascalientes)

Atlético San Luis won 3–0 on aggregate.

28 November 2024
21:10 CST (UTC−6)

Monterrey	1–0	UNAM
Canales 90' (pen.)	Report

Estadio BBVA, Guadalupe
Attendance: 37,379
Referee: Daniel Quintero Huitrón (Jalisco)
1 December 2024
12:00 CST (UTC−6)

UNAM	3–5	Monterrey
Martínez 36', 87'; Pussetto 66'	Report	Berterame 32', 73'; Ocampos 56'; Arteaga 79'; Torres 90+3'

Estadio Olímpico Universitario, Mexico City
Attendance: 37,439
Referee: Marco Antonio Ortiz (Durango)

Monterrey won 6–3 on aggregarate.

== Semi-finals ==
=== Summary ===
The first legs will be played on 4–5 December 2024, and the second legs will be played on 7–8 December 2024.

Team 1	Agg.	Team 2	1st leg	2nd leg
América	4–3	Cruz Azul	0–0	4–3
Atlético San Luis	3–6	Monterrey	2–1	1–5

=== Matches ===
5 December 2024
20:00 CST (UTC−6)

América	0–0	Cruz Azul
	Report

Estadio Ciudad de los Deportes, Mexico City
Attendance: 29,401
Referee: Óscar Mejía García (Mexico City)
8 December 2024
19:00 CST (UTC−6)

Cruz Azul	3–4	América
Rivero 68'; Fernández 80'; Morales 86'	Report	Zendejas 15'; R. Sánchez 49'; Juárez 72'; Aguirre 90+4' (pen.)

Estadio Ciudad de los Deportes, Mexico City
Attendance: 29,404
Referee: Adonai Escobedo González (Aguascalientes)

América won 4–3 on aggregate.

4 December 2024
21:00 CST (UTC−6)

Atlético San Luis	2–1	Monterrey
Bonatini 30'; Chávez 80'	Report	Berterame 66'

Estadio Alfonso Lastras, San Luis Potosí
Attendance: 22,803
Referee: Fernando Hernández Gómez (Mexico City)
7 December 2024
20:00 CST (UTC−6)

Monterrey	5–1	Atlético San Luis
Torres 47' 85'; Berterame 52'; Guillén 82' (o.g.); Vázquez 90+1'	Report	Salles-Lamonge 75' (pen.)

Estadio BBVA, Guadalupe
Attendance: 48,606
Referee: Marco Antonio Ortiz (Durango)

Monterrey won 6–3 on aggregate.

== Finals ==
=== Summary ===
The first leg was played on 12 December 2024, and the second leg was played on 15 December 2024.

Team 1	Agg.	Team 2	1st leg	2nd leg
América	3–2	Monterrey	2–1	1–1

=== First leg ===
12 December 2024
20:00 CST (UTC−6)

América	2–1	Monterrey
Álvarez 39'; Zendejas 49'	Report	Canales 35'

Estadio Cuauhtémoc, Puebla
Attendance: 36,933
Referee: Víctor Alfonso Cáceres (Chiapas)

==== Details ====
América	Monterrey

GK	1	(Mexico) Luis Malagón
DF	5	(Mexico) Kevin Álvarez
DF	3	(Mexico) Israel Reyes
DF	29	(Mexico) Ramón Juárez	(yellow card) 81'
DF	4	(Uruguay) Sebastián Cáceres		(substituted off) 85'
DF	26	(Colombia) Cristian Borja		(substituted off) 78'
MF	6	(Mexico) Jonathan dos Santos	(yellow card) 59'	(substituted off) 64'
MF	8	(Spain) Álvaro Fidalgo
MF	11	(Chile) Víctor Dávila		(substituted off) 64'
MF	17	(United States) Alejandro Zendejas
FW	21	(Mexico) Henry Martín (c)		(substituted off) 78'
Substitutions:
GK	30	(Mexico) Rodolfo Cota
DF	14	(Mexico) Néstor Araujo		(substituted on) 85'
DF	18	(Mexico) Cristian Calderón		(substituted on) 78'
MF	7	(Uruguay) Brian Rodríguez		(substituted on) 78'
MF	10	(Chile) Diego Valdés		(substituted on) 64'
MF	13	(Mexico) Alan Cervantes		(substituted on) 64'
MF	20	(Paraguay) Richard Sánchez
MF	28	(Mexico) Érick Sánchez
FW	19	(Mexico) Illian Hernández
FW	24	(Netherlands) Javairô Dilrosun
Manager:
(Brazil) André Jardine

GK	22	(Mexico) Luis Cárdenas
DF	33	(Colombia) Stefan Medina
DF	4	(Mexico) Víctor Guzmán		(substituted off) 51'
DF	15	(Mexico) Héctor Moreno (c)		(substituted off) 66'
DF	3	(Mexico) Gerardo Arteaga
MF	30	(Argentina) Jorge Rodríguez
MF	204	(Mexico) Iker Fimbres
MF	8	(Spain) Óliver Torres	(yellow card) 73'
MF	10	(Spain) Sergio Canales		(substituted off) 65'
MF	29	(Argentina) Lucas Ocampos		(substituted off) 4'
FW	7	(Mexico) Germán Berterame
Substitutions:
GK	24	(Mexico) César Ramos
DF	6	(Mexico) Edson Gutiérrez
DF	20	(Chile) Sebastián Vegas		(substituted on) 66'
MF	5	(Mexico) Fidel Ambríz
MF	14	(Mexico) Érick Aguirre		(substituted on) 51'
MF	16	(Colombia) Johan Rojas
MF	17	(Mexico) Jesús Corona		(substituted on) 65'
MF	190	(Mexico) César Garza
FW	9	(United States) Brandon Vázquez		(substituted on) 66'
FW	31	(Mexico) Roberto de la Rosa		(substituted on) 4' (substituted off) 66'
Manager:
(Argentina) Martín Demichelis

Assistant referees:
Enríque Isaac Bustos (Guerrero)
Enedina Caudillo Gómez (Michoacán)
Fourth official:
Daniel Quintero Huitrón (Jalisco)
Video assistant referee:
Óscar Macías Romo (Aguascalientes)
Assistant video assistant referee:
Jorge Abraham Camacho (Jalisco)

==== Statistics ====
Statistic	América	Monterrey
Goals scored	2	1
Total shots	13	6
Shots on target	6	1
Saves	0	4
Ball possession	47%	53%
Corner kicks	8	5
Fouls committed	7	9
Offsides	4	0
Yellow cards	2	1
Red cards	0	0

=== Second leg ===
15 December 2024
19:00 CST (UTC−6)

Monterrey	1–1	América
Rojas 85'	Report	R. Sánchez 24'

Estadio BBVA, Guadalupe
Attendance: 52,127
Referee: César Arturo Ramos (Sinaloa)

América won 3–2 on aggregate.

==== Details ====
Monterrey	América

GK	22	(Mexico) Luis Cárdenas
DF	33	(Colombia) Stefan Medina
DF	15	(Mexico) Héctor Moreno (c)		(substituted off) 46'
DF	3	(Mexico) Gerardo Arteaga	(yellow card) 85'
MF	30	(Argentina) Jorge Rodríguez
MF	204	(Mexico) Iker Fimbres
MF	8	(Spain) Óliver Torres		(substituted off) 71'
MF	10	(Spain) Sergio Canales
MF	14	(Mexico) Érick Aguirre		(substituted off) 46'
FW	7	(Mexico) Germán Berterame
FW	9	(United States) Brandon Vázquez		(substituted off) 71'
Substitutions:
GK	24	(Mexico) César Ramos
DF	6	(Mexico) Edson Gutiérrez
DF	20	(Chile) Sebastián Vegas		(substituted on) 46'
DF	32	(Mexico) Tony Leone
MF	5	(Mexico) Fidel Ambríz
MF	16	(Colombia) Johan Rojas		(substituted on) 46'
MF	17	(Mexico) Jesús Corona		(substituted on) 71'
MF	190	(Mexico) César Garza
MF	235	(Mexico) Óscar Soto
FW	31	(Mexico) Roberto de la Rosa		(substituted on) 71'
Manager:
(Argentina) Martín Demichelis

GK	1	(Mexico) Luis Malagón
DF	5	(Mexico) Kevin Álvarez
DF	3	(Mexico) Israel Reyes
DF	29	(Mexico) Ramón Juárez
DF	4	(Uruguay) Sebastián Cáceres
DF	18	(Mexico) Cristian Calderón		(substituted off) 90'
MF	20	(Paraguay) Richard Sánchez		(substituted off) 71'
MF	8	(Spain) Álvaro Fidalgo
MF	13	(Mexico) Alan Cervantes
MF	17	(United States) Alejandro Zendejas	(yellow card) 89'
FW	21	(Mexico) Henry Martín (c)		(substituted off) 42'
Substitutions:
GK	30	(Mexico) Rodolfo Cota
DF	14	(Mexico) Néstor Araujo
DF	26	(Colombia) Cristian Borja		(substituted on) 90'
MF	6	(Mexico) Jonathan dos Santos		(substituted on) 71'
MF	7	(Uruguay) Brian Rodríguez
MF	10	(Chile) Diego Valdés
MF	11	(Chile) Víctor Dávila
MF	28	(Mexico) Érick Sánchez
FW	24	(Netherlands) Javairô Dilrosun
FW	27	(Uruguay) Rodrigo Aguirre		(substituted on) 42'
Manager:
(Brazil) André Jardine

Assistant referees:
José Ibrahim Martínez (Mexico City)
Jonathan Maximiliano Gómez (Nuevo León)
Fourth official:
Óscar Mejía García (Mexico City)
Video assistant referee:
Guillermo Pacheco Larios (Sonora)
Assistant video assistant referee:
Vicente Jassiel Reynoso (Nayarit)

==== Statistics ====
Statistic	Monterrey	América
Goals scored	1	1
Total shots	21	4
Shots on target	6	3
Saves	2	6
Ball possession	71%	29%
Corner kicks	8	5
Fouls committed	10	8
Offsides	0	2
Yellow cards	1	1
Red cards	0	0

== Statistics ==
=== Goalscorers ===
There were 53 goals scored in 17 matches, for an average of 3.12 goals per match.

4 goals

- (Mexico) Germán Berterame (Monterrey)
- (Colombia) Raúl Zúñiga (Tijuana)

3 goals

- (Uruguay) Rodrigo Aguirre (América)
- (Spain) Óliver Torres (Monterrey)

2 goals

- (Brazil) Léo Bonatini (Atlético San Luis)
- (Spain) Sergio Canales (Monterrey)
- (Mexico) Guillermo Martínez (UNAM)
- (Uruguay) Ignacio Rivero (Cruz Azul)
- (Paraguay) Richard Sánchez (América)
- (United States) Alejandro Zendejas (América)

1 goal

- (Mexico) Efraín Álvarez (Tijuana)
- (Mexico) Kevin Álvarez (América)
- (Mexico) Gerardo Arteaga (Monterrey)
- (Spain) Unai Bilbao (Tijuana)
- (Colombia) Cristian Borja (América)
- (Mexico) Kevin Castañeda (Tijuana)
- (Mexico) Ricardo Chávez (Atlético San Luis)
- (Uruguay) Gabriel Fernández (Cruz Azul)
- (Brazil) Vitinho (Atlético San Luis)
- (Greece) Giorgos Giakoumakis (Cruz Azul)
- (Mexico) Víctor Guzmán (Guadalajara)
- (Mexico) Ramón Juárez (América)
- (Mexico) Henry Martín (América)
- (Mexico) Amaury Morales (Cruz Azul)
- (Argentina) Lucas Ocampos (Monterrey)
- (Argentina) Ignacio Pussetto (UNAM)
- (Argentina) Emanuel Reynoso (Tijuana)
- (Mexico) Aldo Rocha (Atlas)
- (Uruguay) Brian Rodríguez (América)
- (Colombia) Johan Rojas (Monterrey)
- (France) Sébastien Salles-Lamonge (Atlético San Luis)
- (Mexico) Ángel Sepúlveda (Cruz Azul)
- (United States) Brandon Vázquez (Monterrey)

1 own goal

- (Mexico) José Castillo (against Atlas)
- (Mexico) Daniel Guillén (against Monterrey)
- (Brazil) Joaquim (against Atlético San Luis)
- (Mexico) Marcel Ruiz (against América)

=== Assists ===
3 assists

- (Spain) Sergio Canales (Monterrey)
- (Spain) Álvaro Fidalgo (América)
- (United States) Alejandro Zendejas (América)

2 assists

- (Uruguay) Brian Rodríguez (América)

1 assist

- (Mexico) Érick Aguirre (Monterrey)
- (Mexico) Efraín Álvarez (Tijuana)
- (Mexico) Diego Barbosa (Tijuana)
- (Brazil) Léo Bonatini (Atlético San Luis)
- (Uruguay) Gabriel Fernández (Cruz Azul)
- (Brazil) Vitinho (Atlético San Luis)
- (Mexico) Alejandro Gómez (Tijuana)
- (Mexico) Javier Güémez (Atlético San Luis)
- (Mexico) César Huerta (UNAM)
- (Mexico) Aarón Mejía (Tijuana)
- (Argentina) Gonzalo Piovi (Cruz Azul)
- (Colombia) Christian Rivera (Tijuana)
- (Mexico) Jorge Sánchez (Cruz Azul)
- (Paraguay) Richard Sánchez (América)
- (Mexico) Ángel Sepúlveda (Cruz Azul)
