= Bryan Gamboa =

Mexican footballer (born 2002)

Personal information
- Full name: Bryan Javier Gamboa Galarza
- Date of birth: 13 March 2002 (age 24)
- Place of birth: Zapopan, Jalisco, Mexico
- Height: 1.80 m (5 ft 11 in)
- Position: Forward

Team information
- Current team: Cruz Azul
- Number: 27

Youth career
- 2023–2025: Cruz Azul

Senior career*
Years	Team	Apps	(Gls)
2021–2023	Diablos Tesistán	41	(35)
2023–	Cruz Azul	11	(1)
2026–	Cruz Azul Hidalgo	10	(1)
- * Club domestic league appearances and goals as of 2 November 2026

Bryan Javier Gamboa Galarza (born 13 March 2002) is a Mexican professional footballer who plays as a forward for Liga MX club Cruz Azul.

Gamboa played for Diablos Tesistán in the Tercera División before joining Cruz Azul's under-23 side in 2023. He made his Liga MX debut in February 2024 and scored his first league goal in July that year. He went on to make appearances in the club's title-winning 2025 CONCACAF Champions Cup and Clausura 2026 campaigns.

== Early life and career ==
Gamboa's nickname, "Cubo", stems from his childhood admiration for Erick Torres. He played neighbourhood football on dirt pitches in Zapopan, where Juan Martínez, head coach of Tercera División club Diablos Tesistán, watched him score five goals in an informal match and invited him to join the team.

== Club career ==
=== Diablos Tesistán ===
Gamboa joined Diablos Tesistán in September 2021 and, alongside his football, worked laying tiles in his family's business. After a gradual tactical adjustment to the professional game, he became a regular starter and the club's top scorer. He recorded 36 goals in 45 matches before playing his last game for the club on 22 April 2023.

=== Cruz Azul ===
According to Martínez, Gamboa drew offers from seven or eight Liga MX clubs. Cruz Azul's approach was led by Joel Huiqui, who had followed the player's progress, together with Jorge Dávalos. Gamboa signed with the club's under-23 side in 2023 and scored four goals in his first intra-squad match. Ricardo Ferretti included him in the squad for the 2023 Leagues Cup. By late August 2023, Ferretti's successor Joaquín Moreno had named him among the substitutes for three consecutive matches, though he did not play.

Gamboa made his Liga MX debut under Martín Anselmi on 2 February 2024, in a 3–1 away win over Querétaro in the Clausura 2024 tournament. On 6 July 2024, in the opening match of the Apertura 2024, he came on as an 80th-minute substitute against Mazatlán at the Estadio Ciudad de los Deportes. He scored his first league goal in stoppage time, converting a cross from Andrés Montaño to secure a 1–0 win.

Gamboa made two appearances in Cruz Azul's 2025 CONCACAF Champions Cup campaign, which ended with the club winning the title. Ahead of the 2025–26 season, he moved up from the under-23s to the first team, and was included in the squad registered for the Apertura 2025. His only appearance that season came as a substitute in the play-offs, as Cruz Azul went on to win the league title.

=== Cruz Azul Hidalgo ===
Although registered with Cruz Azul's first team for the Apertura 2026, Gamboa played for Cruz Azul Hidalgo, the club's reserve side in the Liga de Expansión MX. He scored his first goal for the side in a 3–1 win over Dorados de Sinaloa on 10 October 2026.

== Career statistics ==
As of match played on 22 October 2026

Appearances and goals by club, season and competition
Club	Season	League			Cup (Note: Includes Copa Conecta)		Continental		Other		Total	
Club	Season	Division	Apps	Goals	Apps	Goals	Apps	Goals	Apps	Goals	Apps	Goals
Diablos Tesistán	2021–22	Liga TDP	21	17	2	1	—		—		23	18
Diablos Tesistán	2022–23	Liga TDP	20	18	2	0	—		—		22	18
Diablos Tesistán	Total		41	35	4	1	—		—		45	36
Cruz Azul	2023–24	Liga MX	7	0	—		—		—		7	0
Cruz Azul	2024–25	Liga MX	3	1	—		2	0	—		5	1
Cruz Azul	2025–26	Liga MX	1	0	—		—		—		1	0
Cruz Azul	Total		11	1	—		2	0	—		13	1
Cruz Azul Hidalgo	2026–27	Liga de Expansión MX	10	1	—		—		—		10	1
Career total			62	37	4	1	2	0	0	0	68	38

== Honours ==
Cruz Azul

- Liga MX: Clausura 2026
- CONCACAF Champions Cup: 2025
