= Alexis Gutiérrez =

Mexican footballer (born 2000)

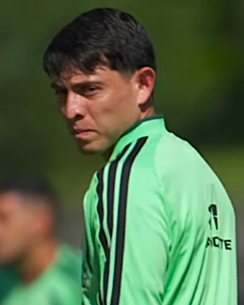
- Gutiérrez with Mexico in 2025

Personal information
- Full name: Alexis Hazael Gutiérrez Torres
- Date of birth: 26 February 2000 (age 26)
- Place of birth: León, Guanajuato, Mexico
- Height: 1.65 m (5 ft 5 in)
- Position: Midfielder

Team information
- Current team: América
- Number: 20

Youth career
- 2012–2019: Guadalajara
- 2019–2021: Cruz Azul

Senior career*
Years	Team	Apps	(Gls)
2019–2025	Cruz Azul	86	(5)
2022	→ Tapatío (loan)	29	(0)
2025–	América	32	(1)

International career^{‡}
2015	Mexico U15	2	(0)
2017	Mexico U17	4	(0)
2018–2019	Mexico U20	7	(2)
2024–	Mexico	4	(0)
Medal record
Men's football
Representing Mexico
CONCACAF Under-17 Championship
First place	2017 Panama	Team
- * Club domestic league appearances and goals as of 31 October 2026 ‡ National team caps and goals as of 25 January 2026

Alexis Hazael Gutiérrez Torres (born 26 February 2000) is a Mexican professional footballer who plays as a midfielder for Liga MX club América and the Mexico national team.

== Club career ==
Originally from León, Guanajuato, Gutiérrez began his career at the youth academy of Guadalajara.

=== Cruz Azul ===
He was transferred to Cruz Azul for the Clausura 2019 tournament and made his professional debut in January 2019 in a Copa MX match against León. Seeking more playing time, he joined Tapatío on a one-year loan.

=== América ===
On 25 June 2025, Gutiérrez joined América.

== Career statistics ==
=== Club ===
As of match played on 31 October 2026

Appearances and goals by club, season and competition
Club	Season	League			National cup		Continental		Other		Total	
Club	Season	Division	Apps	Goals	Apps	Goals	Apps	Goals	Apps	Goals	Apps	Goals
Cruz Azul	2018–19	Liga MX	1	0	4	0	—		—		5	0
Cruz Azul	2019–20	Liga MX	1	0	—		—		—		1	0
Cruz Azul	2020–21	Liga MX	10	1	5 (Note: Appearances in Copa GNP por México)	1	2 (Note: Appearances in CONCACAF Champions League/Cup)	1	—		17	3
Cruz Azul	2021–22	Liga MX	3	0	—		—		—		3	0
Cruz Azul	2022–23	Liga MX	5	0	5 (Note: Appearances in Copa Sky por México)	1	—		—		10	1
Cruz Azul	2023–24	Liga MX	32	1	—		—		—		32	1
Cruz Azul	2024–25	Liga MX	34	3	—		7	0	4 (Note: Appearances in Leagues Cup)	0	45	3
Cruz Azul	Total		86	5	14	2	9	1	4	0	113	8
Tapatío (loan)	2021–22	Liga de Expansión MX	14	0	—		—		—		14	0
Tapatío (loan)	2022–23	Liga de Expansión MX	15	0	—		—		—		15	0
Tapatío (loan)	Total		29	0	—		—		—		29	0
América	2025–26	Liga MX	24	1	1 (Note: One appearance in Campeón de Campeones)	0	3	0	2	0	30	1
América	2026–27	Liga MX	8	0	—		—		1	0	9	0
América	Total		32	1	1	0	3	0	3	0	39	1
Career total			147	6	15	2	12	1	7	0	181	9

=== International ===
As of match played on 25 January 2026

Appearances and goals by national team and year
National team	Year	Apps	Goals
Mexico	2024	1	0
Mexico	2025	1	0
Mexico	2026	2	0
Total		4	0

== Honours ==
Cruz Azul

- Liga MX: Guardianes 2021
- Campeón de Campeones: 2021
- CONCACAF Champions Cup: 2025

Mexico U17

- CONCACAF U-17 Championship: 2017

Mexico

- CONCACAF Nations League: 2024–25

Individual

- CONCACAF U-17 Championship Best XI: 2017
