= Amaury Morales =

Mexican footballer (born 2005)

Personal information
- Full name: Amaury Morales Rosas
- Date of birth: 3 December 2005 (age 20)
- Place of birth: Mexico City, Mexico
- Height: 1.82 m (6 ft 0 in)
- Position: Midfielder

Team information
- Current team: Cruz Azul
- Number: 194

Youth career
- 2018–: Cruz Azul

Senior career*
Years	Team	Apps	(Gls)
2023–	Cruz Azul	54	(3)

International career^{‡}
2024–	Mexico U20	17	(2)
Medal record
Men's football
Representing Mexico
CONCACAF U-20 Championship
Winner	2024 Mexico
- * Club domestic league appearances and goals as of 16:05, 1 October 2026 (UTC) ‡ National team caps and goals as of 11 October 2025

Amaury Morales Rosas (born 3 December 2005) is a Mexican professional footballer who plays as a midfielder for Liga MX club Cruz Azul and the Mexico national under-20 team.

== Club career ==
Born in Mexico City, Morales began his career in Cruz Azul's youth system in 2018, playing from the U-13 to U-23 categories. He made his professional debut on 15 September 2023, in a 2–2 draw against Mazatlán, coming as a substitute for Carlos Rotondi, under the management of Joaquín Moreno. He began to feature in more matches under Martín Anselmi during his debut season with the team.

== International career ==
Morales was called up by Eduardo Arce for the 2024 CONCACAF U-20 Championship. He scored the fourth goal in Mexico's 4–0 victory over Haiti. He later scored the second goal in the quarter-finals against Costa Rica, securing the team's qualification for the 2025 FIFA U-20 World Cup. Mexico went on to win the championship by defeating the United States in the final.

In 2025, Arce called him up to represent Mexico at the FIFA U-20 World Cup held in Chile.

== Career statistics ==
As of match played on 21 May 2026

Appearances and goals by club, season and competition
Club	Season	League			National cup		Continental (Note: Includes CONCACAF Champions Cup)		Other		Total	
Club	Season	Division	Apps	Goals	Apps	Goals	Apps	Goals	Apps	Goals	Apps	Goals
Cruz Azul	2023–24	Liga MX	8	0	—		—		—		8	0
Cruz Azul	2024–25	Liga MX	25	2	—		6	0	—		31	2
Cruz Azul	2025–26	Liga MX	21	1	—		2	1	1 (Note: Includes Leagues Cup)	0	24	2
Career total			54	3	0	0	8	1	1	0	63	4

== Honours ==
Cruz Azul

- Liga MX: Clausura 2026
- CONCACAF Champions Cup: 2025

Mexico U20

- CONCACAF U-20 Championship: 2024

Individual

- CONCACAF Under-20 Championship Best XI: 2024
