= Andrés Montaño (footballer) =

Mexican footballer (born 2002)

Personal information
- Full name: Andrés Anarbol Montaño Mora
- Date of birth: 22 May 2002 (age 24)
- Place of birth: Los Cabos, Baja California Sur, Mexico
- Height: 1.75 m (5 ft 9 in)
- Position: Midfielder

Team information
- Current team: Cruz Azul
- Number: 10

Youth career
- 2019–2020: Morelia
- 2020–2022: Mazatlán

Senior career*
| Years | Team | Apps | (Gls) |
| 2022–2024 | Mazatlán | 58 | (6) |
| 2024– | Cruz Azul | 53 | (12) |

International career^{‡}
| 2022 | Mexico U21 | 2 | (0) |
| 2023–2024 | Mexico U23 | 5 | (0) |
| 2024– | Mexico | 2 | (0) |
Medal record
Men's football
Representing Mexico
Toulon Tournament
| Third place | 2022 France | Team |
| Second place | 2023 France | Team |
- * Club domestic league appearances and goals as of 7 November 2026 ‡ National team caps and goals as of 17 November 2026

Andrés Anarbol Montaño Mora (born 22 May 2002) is a Mexican professional footballer who plays as a midfielder for Liga MX club Cruz Azul and the Mexico national team.

== Club career ==
=== Mazatlán ===
Montaño began his professional development in the youth academy of Morelia before moving to Mazatlán in 2020. He made his professional debut in Liga MX on 11 March 2022, in a match against Monterrey under manager Gabriel Caballero. On 16 February 2023, he scored his first professional goal in a league match against Pachuca.

=== Cruz Azul ===
On 19 June 2024, Montaño joined Cruz Azul for a reported fee of approximately $4 million. On 11 May 2025, during the second-leg of the Clausura 2025 quarter-finals against Léon, he was substituted in the eighth minute due to injury. Two days later, the club announced that he had suffered an ACL injury in his left knee and would undergo surgery.

== International career ==
Montaño was called up by Raúl Chabrand to participate with the under-21 team at the 2022 Maurice Revello Tournament, where Mexico finished the tournament in third place.

Montaño made his senior national team debut on 31 May 2024, in a friendly match against Bolivia which took place at Chicago's Soldier Field.

== Career statistics ==
=== Club ===
As of match played on 7 November 2026

Appearances and goals by club, season and competition
| Club | Season | League | | | National cup | | Continental (Note: Includes CONCACAF Champions Cup) | | Other | | Total | |
| Club | Season | Division | Apps | Goals | Apps | Goals | Apps | Goals | Apps | Goals | Apps | Goals |
|---|---|---|---|---|---|---|---|---|---|---|---|---|
| Mazatlán | 2021–22 | Liga MX | 10 | 0 | — | | — | | — | | 10 | 0 |
| Mazatlán | 2022–23 | Liga MX | 22 | 2 | — | | — | | — | | 22 | 2 |
| Mazatlán | 2023–24 | Liga MX | 26 | 4 | — | | — | | 3 (Note: Appearances in Leagues Cup) | 2 | 29 | 6 |
| Mazatlán | Total | | 58 | 6 | — | | — | | 3 | 2 | 61 | 8 |
| Cruz Azul | 2024–25 | Liga MX | 28 | 4 | — | | 6 | 1 | 4 | 0 | 38 | 5 |
| Cruz Azul | 2025–26 | Liga MX | 13 | 2 | — | | 4 | 0 | — | | 17 | 2 |
| Cruz Azul | 2026–27 | Liga MX | 12 | 6 | — | | — | | 1 (Note: Appearance in Campeón de Campeones) | 0 | 13 | 6 |
| Cruz Azul | Total | | 53 | 12 | 0 | 0 | 10 | 1 | 5 | 0 | 68 | 13 |
| Career total | | | 111 | 18 | 0 | 0 | 10 | 1 | 8 | 2 | 129 | 21 |

=== International ===
As of match played on 17 November 2026

Appearances and goals by national team and year
| National team | Year | Apps | Goals |
|---|---|---|---|
| Mexico | 2024 | 1 | 0 |
| Mexico | 2025 | 0 | 0 |
| Mexico | 2026 | 1 | 0 |
| Total | | 2 | 0 |

== Honours ==
Cruz Azul

- Liga MX: Clausura 2026
- Campeón de Campeones: 2026
- CONCACAF Champions Cup: 2025
