= Carlos Rotondi =

Argentine footballer

Personal information
- Full name: Carlos Rodolfo Rotondi
- Date of birth: 2 March 1997 (age 29)
- Place of birth: Río Cuarto, Córdoba, Argentina
- Height: 1.82 m (6 ft 0 in)
- Position: Winger

Team information
- Current team: Cruz Azul
- Number: 29

Youth career
- 2015–2017: Newell's Old Boys

Senior career*
Years	Team	Apps	(Gls)
2017–2021	Newell's Old Boys	2	(0)
2019	→ San Luis (loan)	17	(4)
2020–2021	→ Santiago Wanderers (loan)	28	(7)
2021–2022	Defensa y Justicia	49	(8)
2022–	Cruz Azul	155	(28)
- * Club domestic league appearances and goals as of 7 November 2026

Carlos Rodolfo Rotondi (born 2 March 1997) is an Argentine professional footballer who plays as a winger for Liga MX club Cruz Azul.

== Career ==
=== Newell’s Old Boys ===
Rotondi began his career with Newell's Old Boys, signing in 2015. He made his senior debut on 11 June 2017 in the Copa Argentina, featuring for twenty-five minutes of a 4–1 victory over Central Norte. Over a year later, Rotondi made his first appearance in professional league football during an away loss to Godoy Cruz on 27 August 2018.

==== Loan to San Luis ====
In February 2019, Rotondi was loaned to San Luis of Primera B de Chile. He scored his first senior goal on 16 March 2019 against Santiago Wanderers, a club he would later join on loan in January 2020, with them now in the Primera División having won promotion.

=== Cruz Azul ===
On 4 July 2022, Cruz Azul announced the signing of Rotondi. He scored his first goal for the club on 27 August 2022 in a league match against Querétaro.

== Career statistics ==
As of match played on 7 November 2026

Appearances and goals by club, season and competition
Club	Season	League			National cup (Note: Includes Copa Argentina, Copa Chile)		Continental		Other		Total	
Club	Season	Division	Apps	Goals	Apps	Goals	Apps	Goals	Apps	Goals	Apps	Goals
Newell's Old Boys	2016–17	Argentine Primera División	—		1	0	—		—		1	0
Newell's Old Boys	2018–19	Argentine Primera División	2	0	—		—		—		2	0
Newell's Old Boys	Total		2	0	1	0	—		—		3	0
San Luis de Quillota (loan)	2019	Primera B	17	4	1	0	—		—		18	4
Santiago Wanderers (loan)	2020	Chilean Primera División	28	7	—		—		—		28	7
Defensa y Justicia	2021	Argentine Primera División	30	3	2	0	6 (Note: Appearances in Copa Libertadores)	1	2 (Note: Appearances in Recopa Sudamericana)	0	40	4
Defensa y Justicia	2022	Argentine Primera División	19	5	1	1	3 (Note: Appearances in Copa Sudamericana)	0	—		23	6
Defensa y Justicia	Total		49	8	3	1	9	1	2	0	63	10
Cruz Azul	2022–23	Liga MX	32	4	—		—		—		32	4
Cruz Azul	2023–24	Liga MX	38	6	—		—		3 (Note: Appearances in Leagues Cup)	0	41	6
Cruz Azul	2024–25	Liga MX	38	11	—		6 (Note: Appearances in CONCACAF Champions Cup)	1	4	1	48	13
Cruz Azul	2025–26	Liga MX	40	6	—		4	0	4 (Note: Three appearances in Leagues Cup, one appearance in FIFA Intercontinental Cup)	0	48	6
Cruz Azul	2026–27	Liga MX	7	1	—		—		2 (Note: One appearance in Campeón de Campeones, one appearance in Campeones Cup)	0	9	1
Cruz Azul	Total		155	28	—		10	1	13	1	178	30
Career total			251	47	5	1	19	2	15	1	290	51

== Honours ==
Defensa y Justicia

- Recopa Sudamericana: 2021

Cruz Azul

- Liga MX: Clausura 2026
- Campeón de Campeones: 2026
- CONCACAF Champions Cup: 2025

Individual

- Liga MX Player of the Month: September 2024
- Liga MX Best XI: Apertura 2024, Clausura 2026
