= Camilo Cándido =

Uruguayan footballer (born 1995)

Personal information
- Full name: Camilo Damián Cándido Aquino
- Date of birth: 2 June 1995 (age 31)
- Place of birth: Montevideo, Uruguay
- Height: 1.74 m (5 ft 9 in)
- Position: Left-back

Youth career
- –2015: Rampla Juniors

Senior career*
Years	Team	Apps	(Gls)
2015–2019	Rampla Juniors	92	(1)
2018	→ San Martín SJ (loan)	0	(0)
2019–2021	Liverpool Montevideo	54	(3)
2021–2023	Nacional	73	(6)
2023	→ Bahia (loan)	19	(1)
2024–2026	Cruz Azul	34	(1)
2025	→ Atlético Nacional (loan)	40	(0)
2026–	Nacional	0	(0)
- * Club domestic league appearances and goals as of 6 February 2026

Camilo Damián Cándido Aquino (born 2 June 1995) is a Uruguayan footballer who plays as a left-back for Uruguayan Primera División club Nacional.

== Honours ==
Nacional

- Uruguayan Primera División: 2022
- Torneo Intermedio: 2022
- Torneo Clausura: 2022
- Supercopa Uruguaya: 2021

Bahia

- Campeonato Baiano: 2023

Atlético Nacional

- Superliga Colombiana: 2025
- Copa Colombia: 2025
