= Richard Sánchez (footballer, born 1996) =

Paraguayan footballer (born 1996)

Personal information
- Full name: Richard Rafael Sánchez Guerrero
- Date of birth: 29 March 1996 (age 30)
- Place of birth: Asunción, Paraguay
- Height: 1.76 m (5 ft 9 1/2 in)
- Position: Defensive midfielder

Team information
- Current team: Olimpia (on loan from Racing Club)
- Number: 26

Senior career*
Years	Team	Apps	(Gls)
2015–2016	River Plate	19	(1)
2017–2019	Olimpia	78	(8)
2019–2025	América	182	(18)
2025–	Racing Club	9	(0)
2026–	→ Olimpia (loan)	0	(0)

International career^{‡}
2018–	Paraguay	31	(1)
- * Club domestic league appearances and goals as of 18:11, 1 January 2026 (UTC) ‡ National team caps and goals as of 31 August 2022

Richard Rafael Sánchez Guerrero (born 29 March 1996) is a Paraguayan professional footballer who plays as a midfielder for División de Honor club Olimpia, on loan from Liga Profesional club Racing Club, and the Paraguay national team.

In 2015, Sánchez made his professional debut at age 19 for River Plate.

== Club career ==
=== Olimpia ===
On 21 May 2017, Sánchez scored his first goal in the Superclásico against Cerro Porteño.

=== América ===
On 25 August 2019, Sánchez officially signed with Liga MX club América for $7 million with a four-year contract.

=== Racing Club ===
On 12 March 2025, Racing Club officially signed Sánchez for $3 million.

== International career ==
=== 2018–19: Debut and first Copa América ===
He was called up to the senior Paraguay squad in March 2018 for a match against USA.

Sánchez made his senior debut for Paraguay on June 5, 2019 in a friendly against Honduras in Ciudad del Este, Paraguay. And he scored his first goal for the National Team in the 2019 Copa America, in a 1–1 tie with Argentina on June 19, 2019.

== Career statistics ==
=== International goals ===
Scores and results list Paraguay's goal tally first.

No	Date	Venue	Opponent	Score	Result	Competition
1.	19 June 2019	Estádio Mineirão, Belo Horizonte, Brazil	Argentina	1–0	1–1	2019 Copa América

== Honours ==
América

- Liga MX: Apertura 2023, Clausura 2024, Apertura 2024
- Campeón de Campeones: 2024
- Campeones Cup: 2024

Individual

- CONCACAF Champions League Team of the Tournament: 2021
