= 2025–26 Cruz Azul season =

99th season in existence of Cruz Azul

Cruz Azul
2025–26 season
- Owner: Cooperativa La Cruz Azul
- Sporting director: Iván Alonso
- Head coach: Nicolás Larcamón (until 22 April 2026); Joel Huiqui (interim) (from 22 April 2026)
- Stadium: Estadio Olímpico Universitario (until December 2025); Estadio Cuauhtémoc (from January 2026); Estadio Azteca (from April 2026)
- Liga MX: Apertura: 3rd (Semi-finals); Clausura: 3rd (Winners)
- Leagues Cup: League phase
- CONCACAF Champions Cup: Quarter-finals
- FIFA Intercontinental Cup: Second round
- Top goalscorer: League: Gabriel Fernández (14); All: Gabriel Fernández (15)
- Highest home attendance: 43,134 (v. Guadalajara, Liga MX Clausura, 21 February 2026)
- Lowest home attendance: 4,647 (v. Vancouver FC, CONCACAF Champions Cup, 12 February 2026)
- Average home league attendance: 20,032
- Biggest win: 5–0 v. Vancouver FC (H); CONCACAF Champions Cup, 12 February 2026
- Biggest defeat: 0–7 v. Seattle Sounders FC (A); Leagues Cup, 31 July 2025
Home colours	Away colours	Third colours

The 2025–26 season was Club de Futbol Cruz Azul's 99th season in their history and their 61st consecutive season in the top flight of Mexican football. In addition to the domestic league, the club also participated in the Leagues Cup, the CONCACAF Champions Cup, and the FIFA Intercontinental Cup.

This was Cruz Azul's first season under new head coach Nicolás Larcamón, who was announced as Vicente Sánchez's replacement on 16 June 2025. This season is the first since 2018–19 without Alexis Gutiérrez.

On 8 January 2026, before the start of the Clausura 2026 tournament, Cruz Azul relocated to Estadio Cuauhtémoc in Puebla. The relocation followed a notification from UNAM on 6 January 2026 that the club's contract at Estadio Olímpico Universitario would not be renewed due to logistical and academic scheduling conflicts.

The winter transfer window brought significant squad turnover, with several long-serving players departing the club: captain Ignacio Rivero, who had been at the club since the 2020–21 season, Carlos Vargas, who had joined in 2022–23, Ángel Sepúlveda and Lorenzo Faravelli, both of whom had arrived in the 2023–24 season, and Mateusz Bogusz and Jorge Sánchez, both of whom had joined the previous season. Following Rivero's departure, Érik Lira was appointed the new club captain.

Larcamón was dismissed on 22 April 2026 following a nine-match winless streak, with Joel Huiqui appointed as interim manager for the remainder of the season. Huiqui took charge for the final matchday of the regular season before guiding the team through the playoffs. Cruz Azul reached the final, where they defeated Pumas UNAM 2–1 to secure the club's tenth league title and Huiqui's first as a manager.

== Squad ==
As of 24 May 2026

No.	Player	Nationality	Date of birth (age)	Since	Signed from
Goalkeepers
1	Andrés Gudiño (3rd captain)	(Mexico)	26 January 1997 (aged 29)	2019	(Mexico) Venados
23	Kevin Mier	(Colombia)	18 May 2000 (aged 26)	2024	(Colombia) Atlético Nacional
30	Emmanuel Ochoa	(Mexico)	5 May 2005 (aged 21)	2025	(United States) San Jose Earthquakes
Defenders
3	Omar Campos	(Mexico)	20 July 2002 (aged 23)	2025	(United States) Los Angeles FC
4	Willer Ditta (4th captain)	(Colombia)	23 January 1997 (aged 29)	2023	(Argentina) Newell's Old Boys
5	Jesús Orozco	(Mexico)	19 February 2002 (aged 24)	2025	(Mexico) Guadalajara
22	Jorge Rodarte	(Mexico)	23 April 2004 (aged 22)	2025	(Mexico) Zacatecas
33	Gonzalo Piovi	(Argentina)	8 September 1994 (aged 31)	2024	(Argentina) Racing Club
Midfielders
6	Érik Lira (captain)	(Mexico)	8 May 2000 (aged 26)	2022	(Mexico) Pumas UNAM
8	Agustín Palavecino	(Argentina)	9 November 1996 (aged 29)	2026	(Mexico) Necaxa
10	Andrés Montaño	(Mexico)	22 May 2002 (aged 24)	2024	(Mexico) Mazatlán
16	Jeremy Márquez	(Mexico)	21 June 2000 (aged 26)	2025	(Mexico) Atlas
17	Amaury García	(Mexico)	19 December 2001 (aged 24)	2024	(Mexico) Pumas UNAM
18	Luka Romero	(Argentina)	18 November 2004 (aged 21)	2025	(Italy) AC Milan
19	Carlos Rodríguez (vice-captain)	(Mexico)	3 January 1997 (aged 29)	2022	(Mexico) Monterrey
20	José Paradela	(Argentina)	15 December 1998 (aged 27)	2025	(Mexico) Necaxa
29	Carlos Rotondi	(Argentina)	2 March 1997 (aged 29)	2022	(Argentina) Defensa y Justicia
32	Cristian Jiménez	(Mexico)	18 July 2002 (aged 23)	2021	(Mexico) Cruz Azul Academy
Forwards
7	Nicolás Ibáñez	(Argentina)	23 August 1994 (aged 31)	2026	(Mexico) Tigres UANL
11	Christian Ebere	(Nigeria)	4 April 1998 (aged 28)	2026	(Uruguay) Nacional
21	Gabriel Fernández	(Uruguay)	13 May 1994 (aged 32)	2024	(Mexico) Pumas UNAM
27	Bryan Gamboa	(Mexico)	13 March 2002 (aged 24)	2025	(Mexico) Cruz Azul Academy

=== New contracts ===
Date	Pos.	No.	Player	Until	Ref.
First team
19 August 2025	MF	19	(Mexico) Carlos Rodríguez	2029	
26 August 2025	MF	8	(Argentina) Lorenzo Faravelli	2026	
2 October 2025	DF	33	(Argentina) Gonzalo Piovi	2028	
16 October 2025	MF	6	(Mexico) Érik Lira	2029	
24 October 2025	MF	29	(Argentina) Carlos Rotondi	2028	
29 October 2025	DF	2	(Mexico) Jorge Sánchez	2028	
Academy
11 July 2025	FW	27	(Mexico) Bryan Gamboa	Undisclosed (Note: First professional contract.)	
11 July 2025	MF	25	(Mexico) Fernando Sámano	Undisclosed	
11 July 2025	MF	28	(Mexico) Mauro Zaleta	Undisclosed	

== Transfers ==
=== In ===
Date	Pos.	No.	Player	From	Fee	Ref.
10 July 2025	MF	16	(Mexico) Jeremy Márquez	(Mexico) Atlas	$4,500,000	
11 July 2025	MF	20	(Argentina) José Paradela	(Mexico) Necaxa	$10,000,000	
17 July 2025	FW	163	(Mexico) Alex Gutiérrez (Note: Player was registered with Cruz Azul Lagunas.)	(Mexico) Necaxa	Undisclosed	
6 January 2026	MF	8	(Argentina) Agustín Palavecino	(Mexico) Necaxa	$5,500,000	
6 February 2026	FW	11	(Nigeria) Christian Ebere	(Uruguay) Nacional	$1,800,000	
10 February 2026	FW	7	(Argentina) Nicolás Ibáñez	(Mexico) Tigres UANL	$2,500,000	
▼ Spending: $24,300,000

=== Out ===
Date	Pos.	No.	Player	To	Fee	Ref.
25 June 2025	MF	14	(Mexico) Alexis Gutiérrez	(Mexico) América	$5,000,000	
18 July 2025	FW	35	(Mexico) Luis Gutiérrez	(Mexico) Querétaro	Undisclosed	
18 December 2025	FW	9	(Mexico) Ángel Sepúlveda	(Mexico) Guadalajara	$3,500,000	
6 January 2026	MF	15	(Uruguay) Ignacio Rivero	(Mexico) Tijuana	Undisclosed	
8 January 2026	MF	8	(Argentina) Lorenzo Faravelli	(Mexico) Necaxa	Undisclosed	
16 January 2026	DF	26	(Mexico) Carlos Vargas	—	Released	
29 January 2026	MF	7	(Poland) Mateusz Bogusz	(United States) Houston Dynamo	$10,000,000	
5 February 2026	DF	2	(Mexico) Jorge Sánchez	(Greece) PAOK	$4,000,000	
6 February 2026	DF	13	(Uruguay) Camilo Cándido	(Uruguay) Nacional	Released	
▲ Income: $22,500,000

=== Loans in ===
Date	Pos.	No.	Player	From	Date until	Ref.
17 July 2025	DF	161	(Mexico) Jorge Rodarte (Note: Player was registered with Cruz Azul Lagunas.)	(Mexico) Zacatecas	21 December 2025 (Note: The club triggered the purchase option to sign the player to a permanent contract.)	

=== Loans out ===
Date	Pos.	No.	Player	To	Date until	Ref.
2 June 2025	MF	34	(Mexico) Leonardo Sámano	(Mexico) Tepatitlán	End of season	
4 July 2025	DF	196	(Venezuela) Javier Suárez	(Mexico) Atlético San Luis	End of season	
8 July 2025	MF	–	(Mexico) Jorge García	(Mexico) Mazatlán	End of season	
13 August 2025	FW	11	(Greece) Giorgos Giakoumakis	(Greece) PAOK	End of season	
27 August 2025	MF	28	(Mexico) Mauro Zaleta	(Mexico) Mazatlán	End of season	
11 December 2025	DF	22	(Mexico) Raymundo Rubio	(Mexico) Correcaminos UAT	End of season	
18 December 2025	MF	25	(Mexico) Fernando Sámano	(Mexico) Tepatitlán	End of season	

== Pre-season and friendlies ==
On 9 June 2025, Cruz Azul announced their plans to head to Morelos for a pre-season tournament held in Zacatepec. This competition would include two confirmed friendly matches against León and either Atlante or Guadalajara, depending on their performance in the initial tournament rounds (either the final or a third-place playoff). A week later, a second friendly competition was confirmed, commencing with a match against Zacatepec, followed by a fixture against either Guadalajara or Santos Laguna. Subsequently, a third preparatory cup was announced, with Cruz Azul facing Once Caldas, and then either Mazatlán or Newell's Old Boys. On 12 September 2025, Cruz Azul announced they would return to the United States for a friendly match against Pumas UNAM, held in Sacramento, California, during the FIFA international break. On 16 September, a second friendly match was announced against León, held in Fresno, California. On 20 December 2025, in prepartation for the Clausura 2026 tournament, Cruz Azul announced a friendly cup match against Jaiba Brava, held in Ciudad Madero, Tamaulipas. On 8 January 2026, it was announced a friendly match against Atlas, held in Carson, California. Two weeks later, a friendly was announced against Atlético Nacional in San Jose, California.

Win Draw Loss Fixtures Cancelled

20 June 2025 Copa Morelos	Cruz Azul	1–2	León	Zacatepec, Mexico
18:30 CST	García 47'	Report	Ramírez (yellow card) 29'; Santos 68'; Ayón 90+3'	Stadium: Estadio Agustín "Coruco" Díaz

22 June 2025 Copa Morelos	Atlante	1–0	Cruz Azul	Zacatepec, Mexico
17:00 CST	Mejía (yellow card) 28'; Coubert 31'; Huerto (yellow card) 40'	Report	J. García (yellow card) 53'; A. García (yellow card) 69'	Stadium: Estadio Agustín "Coruco" Díaz

27 June 2025 Copa por el Bienestar	Zacatecas	2–2 (5–4 p)	Cruz Azul	Zacatecas, Mexico
18:00 CST	Villacorta (yellow card) 21'; Mendoza 54'; Padilla 90+2'	Report	Rivero 14'; Piovi 42', (yellow card) 82'	Stadium: Estadio Carlos Vega Villalba
	Penalties
	Padilla (penalty scored); de los Rios (penalty scored); Ríos (penalty scored); Mendoza (penalty missed); Trejo (penalty scored); Preciado (penalty scored)		(penalty scored) Bogusz; (penalty scored) Piovi; (penalty missed) Derbez; (penalty scored) Mendoza; (penalty scored) Morales; (penalty missed) Zaleta

29 June 2025 Copa por el Bienestar	Cruz Azul	2–0	Santos Laguna	Zacatecas, Mexico
16:00 CST	Bogusz 26'; García 32'; Rivero (yellow card) 60'	Report	Tejeda (yellow card) 43'; Ocejo (yellow card) 49'	Stadium: Estadio Carlos Vega Villalba

3 July 2025 Denso International Football Cup	Cruz Azul	1–0	Once Caldas	Boca del Río, Mexico
20:43 CST	Rivero 66'; Mendoza (yellow card) 78'; Piovi (yellow card) 80'; Ditta (yellow card) 84'	Report	Sánchez (yellow card) 7'; Riquett (yellow card) 84'	Stadium: Estadio Luis "Pirata" Fuente
Note: Fixture was initially scheduled for a 20:00 kick-off.

6 July 2025 Denso International Football Cup	Cruz Azul	1–2	Mazatlán	Boca del Río, Mexico
18:30 CST	Bogusz 33' (pen.), (yellow card) 64'; Ditta (yellow card) 48'; Mendoza (yellow card) 61'; Piovi (red card) 86'	Report	Meraz 3'; Benedetti (yellow card) 58'; Sierra 66'	Stadium: Estadio Luis "Pirata" Fuente

10 October 2025 Friendly	Cruz Azul	2–0	Pumas UNAM	Sacramento, United States
20:05 PDT	Márquez (yellow card) 30'; Bogusz 37'; Faravelli (yellow card) 51'; Paradela 79'	Report		Stadium: Heart Health Park

12 October 2025 Friendly	Cruz Azul	Cancelled	León	Fresno, United States
14:00 PDT		Report		Stadium: Chukchansi Park

4 January 2026 Copa DIF Altamira	Jaiba Brava	2–1	Cruz Azul	Ciudad Madero, Mexico
18:00 CST	Clemente 54'; Torres 59'	Report	Márquez 46'	Stadium: Estadio Tamaulipas

25 January 2026 Friendly	Cruz Azul	1–1	Atlas	Carson, United States
15:30 PST	Paradela 53'	Report	Mora 50'	Stadium: Dignity Health Sports Park

25 March 2026 Friendly	Cruz Azul	3–0	Atlético Nacional	San Jose, United States
20:00 PST	Ibañez 51'; Romero 61'; Levy 79'	Report		Stadium: PayPal Park

== Competitions ==
=== Overall record ===
Competition	First match	Last match	Starting round	Final position	Record							
Competition	First match	Last match	Starting round	Final position	Pld	W	D	L	GF	GA	GD	Win %
Liga MX Apertura	12 July 2025	6 December 2025	Matchday 1	Semi-finals	21	11	8	2	37	24	+13	52.38
Liga MX Clausura	10 January 2026	24 May 2026	Matchday 1	Winners	23	13	8	2	41	24	+17	56.52
Leagues Cup	31 July 2025	7 August 2025	League phase	League phase	3	0	2	1	3	10	−7	0.00
CONCACAF Champions Cup	4 February 2026	14 April 2026	Round one	Quarter-finals	6	3	2	1	13	7	+6	50.00
FIFA Intercontinental Cup	10 December 2025	10 December 2025	Second round	Second round	1	0	0	1	1	2	−1	0.00
Total					54	27	20	7	95	67	+28	50.00

Last updated: 24 May 2026
Source: Soccerway

=== Liga MX Apertura ===
==== League table ====
Pos	Team	Pld	W	D	L	GF	GA	GD	Pts	Qualification
1	Toluca (C)	17	11	4	2	43	18	+25	37	Qualification for the quarter–finals (Note: The first six places in the table qualified for the Liguilla quarter-finals.)
2	Tigres UANL	17	10	6	1	35	16	+19	36	Qualification for the quarter–finals
3	Cruz Azul	17	10	5	2	32	20	+12	35	Qualification for the quarter–finals
4	América	17	10	4	3	33	18	+15	34	Qualification for the quarter–finals
5	Monterrey	17	9	4	4	33	29	+4	31	Qualification for the quarter–finals

Source: Liga MX
Rules for classification: 1) Points; 2) Goal difference; 3) Number of goals scored; 4) Head-to-head results between tied teams; 5) Number of goals scored away; 6) Highest relegation coefficient; 7) Fair Play points
(C) Champions

==== Results summary ====
Overall								Home						Away					
Pld	W	D	L	GF	GA	GD	Pts	W	D	L	GF	GA	GD	W	D	L	GF	GA	GD
21	11	8	2	37	24	+13	41	7	3	1	23	14	+9	4	5	1	14	10	+4

Last updated: 7 December 2025.
Source: Soccerway

==== Results by round ====
Round	1	2	3	4	5	6	7	8	9	10	11	12	13	14	15	16	17	18	19	20	21
Ground	H	A	H	A	H	H	A	A	H	H	A	A	H	A	H	A	H	A	H	H	A
Result	D	D	W	W	W	W	W	W	W	D	L	D	W	D	W	W	L	D	W	D	D
Position	10	13	5	5	3	3	3	2	1	1	4	4	2	5	3	1	3	QF	QF	SF	SF
Points	1	2	5	8	11	14	17	20	23	24	24	25	28	29	32	35	35	–	–	–	–

Source: Liga MX
A = Away; H = Home; W = Win; D = Draw; L = Loss; P = Postponed; QF = Quarter-finals; SF = Semi-finals

==== Matches ====
The league fixtures were announced on 4 June 2025.

Win Draw Loss Fixtures

===== Regular phase =====
12 July 2025 1	Cruz Azul	0–0	Mazatlán	Mexico City
21:05 CST	Rivero (yellow card) 24'; Bogusz (yellow card) 45+2'	Report	Herrera (yellow card) 44'; Colula (yellow card) 66'; Samir (yellow card) 78'; Fierro (yellow card) 90+6'	Stadium: Estadio Olímpico Universitario; Attendance: 20,098; Referee: Maximiliano Quintero Hernández

19 July 2025 2	Atlas	3–3	Cruz Azul	Guadalajara
21:05 CST	Aguirre 17'; González 31'; Sánchez (yellow card) 44'; Dória 60'; Rocha (yellow card) 90+4'	Report	Lira (yellow card) 22'; Sepúlveda 55' (pen.), 58', 90'; Paradela (yellow card) 82'	Stadium: Estadio Jalisco; Attendance: 25,098; Referee: Luis Enrique Santander Aguirre

26 July 2025 3	Cruz Azul	4–1	León	Mexico City
19:00 CST	Rodríguez (yellow card) 34', (goal) 66', 87'; Sepúlveda 62'; Márquez 90+3'	Report	Ayón (yellow card) 51'; Orozco 78' (o.g.)	Stadium: Estadio Olímpico Universitario; Attendance: 20,094; Referee: Daniel Quintero Huitrón

11 August 2025 4	Atlético San Luis	1–2	Cruz Azul	San Luis Potosí
21:05 CST	Dourado (yellow card) 7'; Pedro (red card) 60'; Torres 85'	Report	Orozco (yellow card) 10' (yellow-red card) 90+4'; Lira (yellow card) 38'; Rotondi 52'; Sepúlveda 57' (pen.); Piovi (yellow card) 90+7'	Stadium: Estadio Alfonso Lastras; Attendance: 19,335; Referee: Vicente Jassiel Reynoso Arce

16 August 2025 5	Cruz Azul	3–2	Santos Laguna	Mexico City
19:00 CST	Rodríguez 16'; Rivero 34'; Mendoza (yellow card) 49'; Fernández 82'	Report	Barticciotto 32'; Sordo (red card) 40'; Dájome 47'	Stadium: Estadio Olímpico Universitario; Attendance: 14,101; Referee: Fernando Hernández Gómez

23 August 2025 6	Cruz Azul	1–0	Toluca	Mexico City
21:45 CST	Piovi (yellow card) 56'; Rodríguez (yellow card) 66'; Rotondi (yellow card) 77'; Romero 78'	Report	Domínguez (yellow card) 77'; Barbosa (yellow card) 77'; Castro (yellow card) 90+2'	Stadium: Estadio Olímpico Universitario; Attendance: 22,867; Referee: César Arturo Ramos Palazuelos
Note: Fixture was initially scheduled for a 21:05 kick-off, but was moved due to weather conditions in Mexico City.

30 August 2025 7	Guadalajara	1–2	Cruz Azul	Zapopan
19:07 CST	Sepúlveda (yellow card) 6'; Campillo 11'; González (yellow card) 70'; Gutiérrez (yellow card) 80'; Cowell (yellow card) 90+2'; Romo (yellow card) 90+4'	Report	Paradela 2'; Rotondi 45'; Sánchez (yellow card) 55'	Stadium: Estadio Akron; Attendance: 40,170; Referee: Víctor Alfonso Cáceres Hernández

13 September 2025 8	Pachuca	0–1	Cruz Azul	Pachuca
17:00 CST	Quiñones (yellow card) 45+3' (yellow-red card) 56'; Aceves (red card) 62'; Bauermann (yellow card) 63'; Cádiz (yellow card) 63'	Report	Orozco (red card) 19'; Rivero (yellow card) 20'; Fernández 65' (pen.)	Stadium: Estadio Hidalgo; Attendance: 19,479; Referee: Joaquín Alberto Vizcarra Armenta

19 September 2025 9	Cruz Azul	3–2	Juárez	Mexico City
19:00 CST	Romero 2'; Fernández 23'; Paradela (yellow card) 32', (goal) 36'	Report	Pizarro 14'; Fulgencio 19'; Estupiñán (yellow card) 24'; Murillo (yellow card) 48'	Stadium: Estadio Olímpico Universitario; Attendance: 15,815; Referee: Ismael Rosario Lopez Penuelas

24 September 2025 10	Cruz Azul	2–2	Querétaro	Mexico City
18:00 CST	Paradela 14'; Ditta (yellow card) 27'; Piovi (yellow card) 51'; Romero (red card) 75'; Bogusz (yellow card) 79'; Fernández 83'	Report	Homenchenko 20', 35'; Perlaza (yellow card) 25'; Carcelén (yellow card) 27'; Julio (red card) 62'; Allison (yellow card) 86'	Stadium: Estadio Olímpico Universitario; Attendance: 16,783; Referee: Karen Hernández Andrade

28 September 2025 11	Tijuana	2–0	Cruz Azul	Tijuana
21:05 PDT	Vega (yellow card) 28'; Blanco (yellow card) 38', (goal) 45+4'; Gómez (yellow card) 55'; Mourad 72'	Report	Rodarte (red card) 5'; Piovi (yellow card) 19'	Stadium: Estadio Caliente; Attendance: 29,333; Referee: Jorge Abraham Camacho Peregrina

4 October 2025 12	Tigres UANL	1–1	Cruz Azul	San Nicolás
19:00 CST	Farfan (yellow card) 43'; Brunetta 51'; Guzmán (yellow card) 90+6'; Henrique (yellow card) 90+7'; Aquino (yellow card) 90+11'	Report	Rodríguez (yellow card) 50'; Piovi (yellow card) 57'; Sepúlveda 90+8' (pen.)	Stadium: Estadio Universitario; Attendance: 41,615; Referee: Ismael Rosario Lopez Penuelas

18 October 2025 13	Cruz Azul	2–1	América	Mexico City
21:05 CST	Fernández 33'; Rodarte (yellow card) 40'; Rivero 67', (yellow card) 76'	Report	Rodríguez 31'; Cáceres (yellow card) 51'	Stadium: Estadio Olímpico Universitario; Attendance: 40,237; Referee: Jesús Rafael López Valle

21 October 2025 14	Necaxa	1–1	Cruz Azul	Aguascalientes
19:00 CST	Palavecino 86'	Report	Márquez (yellow card) 59'; Morales 65'; Ditta (yellow card) 79'; Rivero (yellow card) 90+5'	Stadium: Estadio Victoria; Attendance: 17,523; Referee: Vicente Reynoso Arce

25 October 2025 15	Cruz Azul	2–0	Monterrey	Mexico City
21:05 CST	Rotondi (yellow card) 29'; Orozco 44'; Faravelli (yellow card) 49'; Márquez (yellow card) 79'; García (yellow card) 89'; Sepúlveda 90+6'	Report	Torres (red card) 24'; Ramos (yellow card) 90+1'	Stadium: Estadio Olímpico Universitario; Attendance: 18,406; Referee: Daniel Quintero Huitrón

31 October 2025 16	Puebla	0–3	Cruz Azul	Puebla
21:05 CST	Navarro (yellow card) 50'; Gamarra (yellow card) 66'	Report	Bogusz 33'; Márquez 57'; Campos 84'	Stadium: Estadio Cuauhtémoc; Attendance: 25,644; Referee: Guillermo Pacheco Larios

8 November 2025 17	Cruz Azul	2–3	Pumas UNAM	Puebla
21:05 CST	Fernández 14', 19'; Ditta (yellow card) 45+1'; Faravelli (red card) 66'; Lira (yellow card) 67'; Sepúlveda (yellow card) 90+4'	Report	Ruvalcaba 4', (yellow card) 90+5'; Carrasquilla (yellow card) 45+1'; Angulo 80' (pen.); Duarte (yellow card) 84'; Medina 85'; López (yellow card) 90+1'	Stadium: Estadio Cuauhtémoc; Attendance: 36,025; Referee: Fernando Hernández Gómez
Note: Due to a contractual agreement between Cruz Azul and Pumas UNAM, Cruz Azul is not allowed to play as the home team against Pumas UNAM at Estadio Olímpico Universitario. Therefore, this match was relocated to Estadio Cuauhtémoc, Puebla.

===== Final phase =====
====== Quarter-finals ======
27 November 2025 First leg	Guadalajara	0–0	Cruz Azul	Zapopan
20:07 CST	Aguirre (yellow card) 26'; Romo (yellow card) 66'	Report	Ditta (yellow card) 70'; Márquez (yellow card) 90'	Stadium: Estadio Akron; Referee: Guillermo Pacheco Larios

30 November 2025 Second leg	Cruz Azul	3–2 (3–2 agg.)	Guadalajara	Mexico City
19:00 CST	Fernández 14'; Rivero (yellow card) 19'; Márquez 72'; Paradela (yellow card) 74'; Lira (yellow card) 83'; Gudiño (yellow card) 86'; Rodríguez 90+7'	Report	Cowell 8'; González 35'; Gutiérrez (yellow card) 75'; Hernández (penalty missed) 86'	Stadium: Estadio Olímpico Universitario; Referee: Daniel Quintero Huitrón

====== Semi-finals ======
3 December 2025 First leg	Cruz Azul	1–1	Tigres UANL	Mexico City
19:00 CST	Márquez (yellow card) 32'; Fernández 76' (pen.), (yellow card) 77'; Rivero (yellow card) 87'	Report	Correa 61'; Henrique (yellow card) 65'; Guzmán (yellow card) 65'; Garza (yellow card) 90+3'	Stadium: Estadio Olímpico Universitario; Referee: Ismael Rosario Lopez Penuelas

6 December 2025 Second leg	Tigres UANL	1–1 (2 (s)–2 agg.)	Cruz Azul	San Nicolás
21:10 CST	Brunetta 27'	Report	Rotondi (yellow card) 60'; Fernández (penalty missed) 72'; Purata 90+5' (o.g.)	Stadium: Estadio Universitario; Referee: Víctor Alfonso Cáceres Hernández

=== Liga MX Clausura ===
==== League table ====
Pos	Team	Pld	W	D	L	GF	GA	GD	Pts	Qualification
1	Pumas UNAM	17	10	6	1	34	17	+17	36	Qualification for the quarter–finals (Note: The first eight places in the table qualified for the Liguilla quarter-finals.)
2	Guadalajara	17	11	3	3	33	17	+16	36	Qualification for the quarter–finals
3	Cruz Azul (C)	17	9	6	2	31	18	+13	33	Qualification for the quarter–finals
4	Pachuca	17	9	4	4	25	19	+6	31	Qualification for the quarter–finals
5	Toluca	17	8	6	3	28	16	+12	30	Qualification for the quarter–finals

Source: Liga MX
Rules for classification: 1) Points; 2) Goal difference; 3) Number of goals scored; 4) Head-to-head results between tied teams; 5) Number of goals scored away; 6) Highest relegation coefficient; 7) Fair Play points
(C) Champions

==== Results summary ====
Overall								Home						Away					
Pld	W	D	L	GF	GA	GD	Pts	W	D	L	GF	GA	GD	W	D	L	GF	GA	GD
23	13	8	2	41	24	+17	47	7	3	1	19	8	+11	6	5	1	22	16	+6

Last updated: 24 May 2026.
Source: Soccerway

==== Results by round ====
Round	1	2	3	4	5	6	7	8	9	10	11	12	13	14	15	16	17	18	19	20	21	22	23
Ground	A	H	H	A	A	H	H	A	A	H	A	A	H	A	H	A	H	A	H	H	A	H	A
Result	L	W	W	W	D	W	W	W	W	W	D	D	L	D	D	D	W	W	W	D	W	D	W
Position	12	6	4	2	3	2	2	1	1	1	1	2	2	2	4	4	3	QF	QF	SF	SF	F	F
Points	0	3	6	9	10	13	16	19	22	25	26	27	27	28	29	30	33	–	–	–	–	–	–

Source: Liga MX
A = Away; H = Home; W = Win; D = Draw; L = Loss; P = Postponed; F = Finals; QF = Quarter-finals; SF = Semi-finals

==== Matches ====
The league fixtures were announced on 1 December 2025.

===== Regular phase =====
10 January 2026 1	León	2–1	Cruz Azul	León
19:00 CST	Díaz 45+2'; Colula 50'; Reyes (yellow card) 60'; Echeverría (yellow card) 90+7'; Rodríguez (yellow card) 90+8'	Report	Palavecino 90'; Ditta (yellow card) 90+3'	Stadium: Estadio León; Attendance: 18,694; Referee: Víctor Alfonso Cáceres Hernández

14 January 2026 2	Cruz Azul	2–0	Atlas	Puebla
17:00 CST	Fernández 8'; Palavecino (yellow card) 12'; Paradela 28'; Ditta (yellow card) 45+4'	Report	Capasso (yellow card) 45+3'; Rocha (yellow card) 45+4'; Ríos (yellow card) 90'	Stadium: Estadio Cuauhtémoc; Attendance: 7,519; Referee: Yonatan Peinado Aguirre
Note: Fixture was initially scheduled for 13 January, but was moved due to Cruz Azul's relocation to Estadio Cuauhtémoc.

17 January 2026 3	Cruz Azul	1–0	Puebla	Puebla
21:05 CST	Paradela 78'; Levy (yellow card) 85'	Report	Monárrez (red card) 11'; Gutiérrez (yellow card) 59'; Navarro (yellow card) 66'	Stadium: Estadio Cuauhtémoc; Attendance: 15,440; Referee: Mario Terrazas Chávez

30 January 2026 4	Juárez	3–4	Cruz Azul	Ciudad Juárez
20:06 MST	Martínez (yellow card) 19'; Estupiñán 45+10' (pen.), 90+1'; Castilho 81'	Report	Palavecino 1'; Paradela 7'; Ditta (yellow card) 22'; Rotondi 39', (penalty missed) 62', (yellow card) 82'; Rodríguez 51'; Gudiño (yellow card) 79'; Fernández (red card) 82'	Stadium: Estadio Olímpico Benito Juárez; Attendance: 14,124; Referee: Jesus Rafael Lopez Valle

7 February 2026 5	Toluca	1–1	Cruz Azul	Toluca
17:00 CST	Paulinho 41'	Report	Lira (yellow card) 70'; Romero (yellow card) 76'; Paradela 77'	Stadium: Estadio Nemesio Díez; Attendance: 27,273; Referee: Luis Enrique Santander Aguirre

15 February 2026 6	Cruz Azul	2–1	Tigres UANL	Puebla
16:30 CST	Ibáñez (yellow card) 45+3', (goal) 60'; Joaquim 56' (o.g.); Rotondi (yellow card) 64'; Rodarte (yellow card) 88'	Report	Lainez (yellow card) 37'; Correa 71'; Joaquim (yellow card) 90+4'	Stadium: Estadio Cuauhtémoc; Attendance: 16,419; Referee: Daniel Quintero Huitrón
Note: Fixture was initially scheduled for a 19:00 kickoff, but was moved for internal competition logistics.

21 February 2026 7	Cruz Azul	2–1	Guadalajara	Puebla
21:05 CST	Palavecino (yellow card) 6'; Lira (yellow card) 31'; Fernández 34'; Gudiño (yellow card) 38'; Piovi (yellow card) 41'; Paradela (yellow card) 51'; Rodríguez 85', (yellow card) 90+2'; Romero (yellow card) 90+3'	Report	Aguirre (yellow card) 6'; Govea (yellow card) 33'; Ledezma (yellow card) 41'; Sepúlveda 81'	Stadium: Estadio Cuauhtémoc; Attendance: 43,134; Referee: Maximiliano Quintero Hernández

28 February 2026 8	Monterrey	0–2	Cruz Azul	Guadalupe
19:05 CST	Arteaga (yellow card) 16'	Report	Paradela (penalty missed) 13'; Rotondi 19'; Gudiño (yellow card) 30'; Piovi (yellow card) 45+6'; Palavecino (yellow card) 45+6', (goal) 62'	Stadium: Estadio BBVA; Attendance: 47,907; Referee: Guillermo Pacheco Larios

3 March 2026 9	Santos Laguna	1–2	Cruz Azul	Torreón
19:00 CST	Gómez (yellow card) 14'; Güemez (yellow card) 28'; Bullaude 54'; Ortega (yellow card) 80'	Report	Márquez 15'; Ibañez (yellow card) 29'; Paradela 78'; Palavecino (yellow card) 89'	Stadium: Estadio Corona; Attendance: 15,065; Referee: Iván Antonio López Sánchez

7 March 2026 10	Cruz Azul	3–0	Atlético San Luis	Puebla
17:00 CST	Palavecino 16'; Ditta (yellow card) 53'; Fernández 67'; Montaño 71'; Lira (yellow card) 87'	Report	Esteves (yellow card) 31'; Lajud (yellow card) 36'; Águila (red card) 45+3'	Stadium: Estadio Cuauhtémoc; Attendance: 10,090; Referee: Vicente Jassiel Reynoso Arce

14 March 2026 11	Pumas UNAM	2–2	Cruz Azul	Mexico City
21:10 CST	Carrasquilla (yellow card) 12'; Silva (yellow card) 15' (yellow-red card) 69'; Juninho 62' (pen.); Martínez (yellow card) 75'; Ditta 78' (o.g.); Navas (yellow card) 85'; Bennevendo (yellow card) 90'	Report	Ibáñez 36'; Rodríguez 43'; Ditta (yellow card) 62'	Stadium: Estadio Olímpico Universitario; Attendance: 42,223; Referee: Daniel Quintero Huitrón

20 March 2026 12	Mazatlán	1–1	Cruz Azul	Mazatlán
20:06 MST	Ovalle 48'; Rubio (yellow card) 68'; Santos (yellow card) 75'	Report	Paradela (yellow card) 59'; Palavecino (yellow card) 70'; Fernández 87'	Stadium: Estadio El Encanto; Attendance: 13,746; Referee: Maximiliano Quintero Hernández

4 April 2026 13	Cruz Azul	1–2	Pachuca	Puebla
19:05 CST	Piovi (yellow card) 23'; Ebere 45+2'	Report	Kenedy 5', 58'; Rivera (red card) 84'; Pedraza (yellow card) 90'; Rodríguez (yellow card) 90'	Stadium: Estadio Cuauhtémoc; Attendance: 14,726; Referee: Víctor Alfonso Cáceres Hernández

11 April 2026 14	América	1–1	Cruz Azul	Mexico City
21:05 CST	Salas 17'	Report	Piovi (yellow card) 20'; Campos 45+3'	Stadium: Estadio Azteca; Attendance: 46,884; Referee: Oscar Mejía García
Note: Fixture was initially scheduled at Estadio Ciudad de los Deportes, but was later moved after Liga MX authorized América to play its home matches at Estadio Azteca.

18 April 2026 15	Cruz Azul	1–1	Tijuana	Puebla
17:00 CST	G. Fernández 17' (pen.); Lira (yellow card) 45+1'; Ditta (yellow card) 90+2'	Report	R. Fernández (yellow card) 20'; Mourad 25'; Zapata (yellow card) 90'	Stadium: Estadio Cuauhtémoc; Attendance: 8,336; Referee: Luis Enrique Santander Aguirre

21 April 2026 16	Querétaro	1–1	Cruz Azul	Querétaro
19:00 CST	Parra (yellow card) 24'; Márquez 45+2' (o.g.); Homenchenko (yellow card) 45+3'; Duarte (yellow card) 45+4'	Report	Piovi (yellow card) 5'; Márquez 9'; Palavecino (yellow card) 45+2'	Stadium: Estadio Corregidora; Attendance: 29,822; Referee: Vicente Jassiel Reynoso Arce

26 April 2026 17	Cruz Azul	4–1	Necaxa	Mexico City
19:05 CST	Paradela 52'; Palavecino 63'; García (yellow card) 66'; Romero 77'; Montaño 90+5'	Report	Rossano (yellow card) 59'; Monreal 71' (pen.); Méndez (yellow card) 73'; Lara (red card) 75'; Oliveros (yellow card) 76'; Alonso (yellow card) 83'	Stadium: Estadio Azteca; Attendance: 20,448; Referee: Iván Antonio López Sánchez
Note: Fixture was initially scheduled at Estadio Cuauhtémoc, but was later moved after Liga MX authorized Cruz Azul to play at Estadio Azteca.

===== Final phase =====
====== Quarter-finals ======
2 May 2026 First leg	Atlas	2–3	Cruz Azul	Guadalajara
21:15 CST	Rodríguez (yellow card) 43'; González 69'; Rocha 81' (pen.), (yellow card) 81'	Report	Campos (yellow card) 36'; Rodarte (yellow card) 41'; Piovi (yellow card) 43'; Rotondi 45+3'; Ebere 55', 87' (pen.)	Stadium: Estadio Jalisco; Referee: Yonatan Peinado Aguirre

9 May 2026 Second leg	Cruz Azul	1–0 (4–2 agg.)	Atlas	Mexico City
21:15 CST	Paradela 32'	Report	Ríos (yellow card) 54'; Rodríguez (yellow card) 87'	Stadium: Estadio Azteca; Referee: Katia Itzel García

====== Semi-finals ======
13 May 2026 First leg	Cruz Azul	2–2	Guadalajara	Mexico City
20:00 CST	Ebere (yellow card) 17', (goal) 56' (pen.); Rodríguez 37'; Campos (yellow card) 65'; Palavecino (yellow card) 84'; García (yellow card) 88'; Montaño (yellow card) 90+3'	Report	Sepúlveda (yellow card) 11', (goal) 50'; Sandoval 29'; Marín (yellow card) 68'; Ledezma (yellow card) 84'	Stadium: Estadio Azteca; Referee: Maximiliano Quintero Hernández

16 May 2026 Second leg	Guadalajara	1–2 (3–4 agg.)	Cruz Azul	Guadalajara
19:07 CST	Govea 8'; González (yellow card) 42'; Aguayo (yellow card) 86'	Report	Márquez 5', (yellow card) 90+8'; Paradela (yellow card) 42'; Palavecino 66'; Campos (yellow card) 81'	Stadium: Estadio Jalisco; Referee: César Arturo Ramos Palazuelos

====== Finals ======
21 May 2026 First leg	Cruz Azul	0–0	Pumas UNAM	Mexico City
20:00 CST	Márquez (yellow card) 42'; García (yellow card) 49'	Report	Angulo (yellow card) 56'; Vite (yellow card) 70'	Stadium: Estadio Ciudad de los Deportes; Referee: Ismael López Peñuelas

24 May 2026 Second leg	Pumas UNAM	1–2 (1–2 agg.)	Cruz Azul	Mexico City
19:00 CST	Morales 31'; López (yellow card) 45'; Antuna (red card) 90+3'; Rico (red card) 90+8'	Report	Duarte 54' (o.g.); Rotondi 90+5'	Stadium: Estadio Olímpico Universitario; Referee: Daniel Quintero Huitrón

=== Leagues Cup ===
As a Liga MX side, Cruz Azul entered the Leagues Cup in the league phase.

==== League phase ====
Pos	Team	Pld	W	PW	PL	L	GF	GA	GD	Pts
10	América	3	0	2	1	0	6	6	0	5
11	Necaxa	3	1	0	1	1	6	8	−2	4
12	Cruz Azul	3	0	2	0	1	3	10	−7	4
13	Tijuana	3	1	0	0	2	5	8	−3	3
14	Monterrey	3	0	1	0	2	3	6	−3	2

Source: Leagues Cup

Round	1	2	3
Ground	N	A	N
Result	L	D	D
Position	18	14	12
Points	0	2	4

Source: Leagues Cup
A = Away; N = Neutral; W = Win; D = Draw; L = Loss

Win Draw Loss Fixtures

31 July 2025 1	Cruz Azul (Mexico)	0–7	(United States) Seattle Sounders FC	Seattle, United States
19:30 PDT	Ditta (yellow card) 32'; Rivero (yellow card) 41'; Paradela (yellow card) 64'	Report	Musovski (yellow card) 32'; Yeimar 48'; Vargas 50'; Ferreira 58'; De Rosario 69', (yellow card) 71'; de la Vega 76', 90+1'; Nouhou 88'	Stadium: Lumen Field; Attendance: 22,697; Referee: Víctor Cáceres (Mexico)

3 August 2025 2	LA Galaxy (United States)	1–1 (7−8 p)	(Mexico) Cruz Azul	Carson, United States
19:30 PDT	Reus (yellow card) 14'; Paintsil (yellow card) 70'; Fagúndez (yellow card) 72'; Pec 81'; Yoshida (yellow card) 90+1'; Garcés (yellow card) 90+3'	Report	Rodríguez 21'; Rivero (yellow card) 47'; Lira (yellow card) 70'; Márquez (yellow card) 84'	Stadium: Dignity Health Sports Park; Attendance: 24,285; Referee: Filiberto Martínez (El Salvador)
	Penalties
	Reus (penalty scored); Pec (penalty scored); Nascimento (penalty scored); Fagúndez (penalty scored); Paintsil (penalty scored); Cuevas (penalty scored); Nelson (penalty scored); Cerrillo (penalty missed); Garcés (penalty missed)		(penalty scored) Lira; (penalty scored) Rivero; (penalty scored) Piovi; (penalty scored) Rodríguez; (penalty scored) Ditta; (penalty scored) Márquez; (penalty scored) Romero; (penalty missed) Orozco; (penalty scored) Levy

7 August 2025 3	Cruz Azul (Mexico)	2–2 (5–4 p)	(United States) Colorado Rapids	Carson, United States
17:30 PDT	Ditta 43', (yellow card) 56'; Rivero 78'; Márquez (yellow card) 82'	Report	Navarro 3'; Maxsø 41'; Yapi (yellow card) 76'	Stadium: Dignity Health Sports Park; Attendance: 8,454; Referee: Joe Dickerson (United States)
	Penalties
	Lira (penalty scored); Bogusz (penalty scored); Paradela (penalty scored); Piovi (penalty scored); Rodríguez (penalty scored)		(penalty scored) Yapi; (penalty missed) Larraz; (penalty scored) Harris; (penalty scored) Wathuta; (penalty scored) Bassett

=== CONCACAF Champions Cup ===
As the first-placed team in the 2024–25 aggregate table in Liga MX, Cruz Azul entered the CONCACAF Champions Cup in round one.

==== Round one ====
The draw for round one was held on 9 December 2025. Cruz Azul were drawn against Canadian side Vancouver FC.

4 February 2026 First leg	Vancouver FC	0–3	Cruz Azul	Langley, Canada
19:00 PST	Pecile (yellow card) 2'; Mezquida (yellow card) 90+1'	Report	Paradela 22', (yellow card) 81'; Piovi (yellow card) 30'; Morales 44'; Palavecino 65'; Ditta (yellow card) 90+5'	Stadium: Willoughby Stadium; Attendance: 6,038; Referee: José Torres (Puerto Rico)

12 February 2026 Second leg	Cruz Azul	5–0 (8–0 agg.)	Vancouver FC	Puebla, Mexico
19:00 CST	Ditta (yellow card) 15'; Romero 37', 45+1', 62'; Rodarte 68'; Ibáñez 74'	Report	Norman Jr. (yellow card) 83'	Stadium: Estadio Cuauhtémoc; Attendance: 4,647; Referee: Tori Penso (United States)

==== Round of 16 ====
Cruz Azul were drawn against fellow Mexican side Monterrey.

10 March 2026 First leg	Monterrey	2–3	Cruz Azul	Guadalupe, Mexico
19:00 CST	Rodríguez (yellow card) 19'; de la Rosa 35', 40'; Mele (yellow card) 62' (yellow-red card) 80'; Reyes (yellow card) 88'	Report	Lira 25'; Márquez (yellow card) 41'; Piovi (yellow card) 52', (goal) 84' (pen.); Ibáñez 90'	Stadium: Estadio BBVA; Attendance: 28,889; Referee: Drew Fischer (Canada)

17 March 2026 Second leg	Cruz Azul	1–1 (4–3 agg.)	Monterrey	Puebla, Mexico
21:00 CST	Piovi (yellow card) 37'; Paradela 46'; Rodarte (yellow card) 51'	Report	Rodríguez 8', (yellow card) 59'; Frayde (yellow card) 29'; Guzmán (yellow card) 45+4'; Salcedo (yellow card) 57'	Stadium: Estadio Cuauhtémoc; Attendance: 10,040; Referee: Joe Dickerson (United States)

==== Quarter-finals ====
Cruz Azul were drawn against American side Los Angeles FC.

7 April 2026 First leg	Los Angeles FC	3–0	Cruz Azul	Los Angeles, United States
19:00 PDT	Son Heung-min 30'; Martínez 39', 58'; Palencia (yellow card) 80'	Report	García (yellow card) 34'; Palavecino (yellow card) 61'; Rotondi (yellow card) 90+3'	Stadium: BMO Stadium; Attendance: 17,521; Referee: Keylor Herrera (Costa Rica)

14 April 2026 Second leg	Cruz Azul	1–1 (1–4 agg.)	Los Angeles FC	Puebla, Mexico
19:00 CST	Fernández (yellow card) 12', (goal) 18' (pen.); Palavecino (yellow card) 12'; Rodríguez (yellow card) 13'; Rotondi (yellow card) 13'; Paradela (yellow card) 79'; Piovi (red card) 90+2'	Report	Bouanga (yellow card) 12', (goal) 90+7' (pen.); Porteous (yellow card) 20'; Segura (yellow card) 41'	Stadium: Estadio Cuauhtémoc; Attendance: 24,965; Referee: Iván Barton (El Salvador)

=== FIFA Intercontinental Cup ===
As the CONCACAF Champions Cup winners, Cruz Azul entered the FIFA Intercontinental Cup in the second round.

==== Second round ====
FIFA Derby of the Americas

10 December 2025 Second round	Cruz Azul (Mexico)	1–2	(Brazil) Flamengo	Al Rayyan, Qatar
20:00 AST	Ditta (yellow card) 35'; Sánchez 44'; Piovi (yellow card) 90+5'	Report	de Arrascaeta 15', 71'; Jorginho (yellow card) 77'; Sandro (yellow card) 90+4'; Everton (yellow card) 90+5'; de la Cruz (yellow card) 90+5'	Stadium: Ahmad bin Ali Stadium; Attendance: 7,108; Referee: Glenn Nyberg (Sweden)

== Statistics ==
As of match played 24 May 2026

=== Appearances ===
Players with no appearances are not included on the list.

No.	Pos	Nat	Player	Total		Liga MX Apertura		Liga MX Clausura		Leagues Cup		Champions Cup		FIFA Intercontinental Cup	
No.	Pos	Nat	Player	Apps	Goals	Apps	Goals	Apps	Goals	Apps	Goals	Apps	Goals	Apps	Goals
1	GK	(Mexico) MEX	Andrés Gudiño	22	0	5+1	0	13+0	0	0+0	0	2+0	0	1+0	0
3	DF	(Mexico) MEX	Omar Campos	48	2	6+11	1	17+4	1	1+2	0	5+1	0	0+1	0
4	DF	(Colombia) COL	Willer Ditta	52	1	20+1	0	22+0	0	3+0	1	5+0	0	1+0	0
5	DF	(Mexico) MEX	Jesús Orozco	18	1	9+6	1	0+1	0	1+1	0	0+0	0	0+0	0
6	MF	(Mexico) MEX	Érik Lira	47	1	19+1	0	15+2	0	3+0	0	5+1	1	1+0	0
7	FW	(Argentina) ARG	Nicolás Ibáñez	13	4	0+0	0	6+3	2	0+0	0	1+3	2	0+0	0
8	MF	(Argentina) ARG	Agustín Palavecino	27	7	0+0	0	21+1	6	0+0	0	5+0	1	0+0	0
10	MF	(Mexico) MEX	Andrés Montaño	17	2	0+0	0	2+11	2	0+0	0	2+2	0	0+0	0
11	FW	(Nigeria) NGR	Christian Ebere	19	4	0+0	0	7+9	4	0+0	0	0+3	0	0+0	0
16	MF	(Mexico) MEX	Jeremy Márquez	49	6	9+8	3	19+3	3	0+3	0	6+0	0	1+0	0
17	MF	(Mexico) MEX	Amaury García	27	0	1+4	0	10+8	0	0+0	0	3+1	0	0+0	0
18	MF	(Argentina) ARG	Luka Romero	46	6	9+9	2	4+15	1	1+2	0	1+4	3	0+1	0
19	MF	(Mexico) MEX	Carlos Rodríguez	54	9	17+4	4	22+1	4	3+0	1	5+1	0	1+0	0
20	MF	(Argentina) ARG	José Paradela	54	12	20+1	3	21+2	7	2+1	0	5+1	2	1+0	0
21	FW	(Uruguay) URU	Gabriel Fernández	43	15	12+5	9	10+9	5	0+0	0	5+1	1	1+0	0
22 (Note: Player was registered with Cruz Azul Lagunas on the start of the season with squad number 161, but later registered with the first-team.)	DF	(Mexico) MEX	Jorge Rodarte	23	1	3+1	0	6+8	0	0+0	0	3+2	1	0+0	0
23	GK	(Colombia) COL	Kevin Mier	31	0	16+0	0	10+0	0	3+0	0	2+0	0	0+0	0
27	FW	(Mexico) MEX	Bryan Gamboa	1	0	0+0	0	0+1	0	0+0	0	0+0	0	0+0	0
29	MF	(Argentina) ARG	Carlos Rotondi	48	6	16+3	2	21+0	4	2+1	0	3+1	0	1+0	0
30	GK	(Mexico) MEX	Emmanuel Ochoa	2	0	0+0	0	0+0	0	0+0	0	2+0	0	0+0	0
33	DF	(Argentina) ARG	Gonzalo Piovi	46	1	16+1	0	22+0	0	2+0	0	4+0	1	1+0	0
170	MF	(Mexico) MEX	Ariel Castro (Note: Player registered with Cruz Azul Lagunas.)	2	0	0+0	0	0+2	0	0+0	0	0+0	0	0+0	0
193	MF	(Mexico) MEX	Jaziel Mendoza (Note: Player registered with the under-21 team.)	3	0	1+0	0	0+1	0	0+0	0	0+1	0	0+0	0
194	MF	(Mexico) MEX	Amaury Morales	24	2	2+3	1	0+16	0	1+0	0	2+0	1	0+0	0
197	DF	(Mexico) MEX	Iván Silva	1	0	0+0	0	0+1	0	0+0	0	0+0	0	0+0	0
200	MF	(Mexico) MEX	Emmanuel Sánchez	1	0	0+1	0	0+0	0	0+0	0	0+0	0	0+0	0
203	MF	(Mexico) MEX	Rogelio González	1	0	0+0	0	0+1	0	0+0	0	0+0	0	0+0	0
209	DF	(Mexico) MEX	Josué Díaz	2	0	0+0	0	0+1	0	0+0	0	0+1	0	0+0	0
214	FW	(Mexico) MEX	Mateo Levy	19	0	0+5	0	1+7	0	0+3	0	0+3	0	0+0	0
239	MF	(Mexico) MEX	Diego Valdéz (Note: Player registered with the under-19 team.)	2	0	0+0	0	0+0	0	0+0	0	0+2	0	0+0	0
Player(s) who have made an appearance but departed the club during the season:
2	DF	(Mexico) MEX	Jorge Sánchez	21	1	13+2	0	3+1	0	1+0	0	0+0	0	1+0	1
7	MF	(Poland) POL	Mateusz Bogusz	17	1	6+7	1	0+0	0	1+2	0	0+0	0	0+1	0
8	MF	(Argentina) ARG	Lorenzo Faravelli	23	0	9+10	0	0+0	0	3+0	0	0+0	0	0+1	0
9	FW	(Mexico) MEX	Ángel Sepúlveda	24	7	10+10	7	0+0	0	3+0	0	0+0	0	0+1	0
15	MF	(Uruguay) URU	Ignacio Rivero	23	3	12+7	2	0+0	0	3+0	1	0+0	0	1+0	0

=== Goals ===
Rank	Pos.	No.	Player	Liga MX Apertura	Liga MX Clausura	Leagues Cup	Champions Cup	FIFA Intercontinental Cup	Total
1	FW	21	(Uruguay) Gabriel Fernández	9	5	0	1	0	15
2	MF	20	(Argentina) José Paradela	3	7	0	2	0	12
3	MF	19	(Mexico) Carlos Rodríguez	4	4	1	0	0	9
4	MF	8	(Argentina) Agustín Palavecino	0	6	0	1	0	7
4	FW	9	(Mexico) Ángel Sepúlveda	7	0	0	0	0	7
6	MF	16	(Mexico) Jeremy Márquez	3	3	0	0	0	6
6	MF	18	(Argentina) Luka Romero	2	1	0	3	0	6
6	MF	29	(Argentina) Carlos Rotondi	2	4	0	0	0	6
9	FW	11	(Nigeria) Christian Ebere	0	4	0	0	0	4
9	FW	7	(Argentina) Nicolás Ibáñez	0	2	0	2	0	4
11	MF	15	(Uruguay) Ignacio Rivero	2	0	1	0	0	3
12	DF	3	(Mexico) Omar Campos	1	1	0	0	0	2
12	MF	10	(Mexico) Andrés Montaño	0	2	0	0	0	2
12	MF	194	(Mexico) Amaury Morales (Note: Player registered with the under-21 team.)	1	0	0	1	0	2
15	MF	7	(Poland) Mateusz Bogusz	1	0	0	0	0	1
15	DF	4	(Colombia) Willer Ditta	0	0	1	0	0	1
15	MF	6	(Mexico) Érik Lira	0	0	0	1	0	1
15	DF	5	(Mexico) Jesús Orozco	1	0	0	0	0	1
15	DF	33	(Argentina) Gonzalo Piovi	0	0	0	1	0	1
15	DF	22	(Mexico) Jorge Rodarte	0	0	0	1	0	1
15	DF	2	(Mexico) Jorge Sánchez	0	0	0	0	1	1
Own goals				1	2	0	0	0	3
Total				37	41	3	13	1	95

=== Assists ===
Rank	Pos.	No.	Player	Liga MX Apertura	Liga MX Clausura	Leagues Cup	Champions Cup	FIFA Intercontinental Cup	Total
1	MF	20	(Argentina) José Paradela	5	5	0	0	0	10
2	FW	21	(Uruguay) Gabriel Fernández	2	4	0	2	0	8
2	MF	29	(Argentina) Carlos Rotondi	3	4	1	0	0	8
4	MF	19	(Mexico) Carlos Rodríguez	5	1	0	0	1	7
5	DF	3	(Mexico) Omar Campos	0	2	0	2	0	4
6	MF	8	(Argentina) Agustín Palavecino	0	3	0	0	0	3
6	FW	9	(Mexico) Ángel Sepúlveda	3	0	0	0	0	3
8	MF	7	(Poland) Mateusz Bogusz	1	0	1	0	0	2
8	DF	4	(Colombia) Willer Ditta	0	2	0	0	0	2
8	MF	16	(Mexico) Jeremy Márquez	1	0	0	1	0	2
8	MF	194	(Mexico) Amaury Morales (Note: Player registered with the under-21 team.)	0	1	1	0	0	2
8	DF	33	(Argentina) Gonzalo Piovi	2	0	0	0	0	2
8	MF	18	(Argentina) Luka Romero	2	0	0	0	0	2
14	FW	11	(Nigeria) Christian Ebere	0	1	0	0	0	1
14	MF	8	(Argentina) Lorenzo Faravelli	1	0	0	0	0	1
14	FW	7	(Argentina) Nicolás Ibáñez	0	1	0	0	0	1
14	MF	10	(Mexico) Andrés Montaño	0	0	0	1	0	1
14	DF	5	(Mexico) Jesús Orozco	1	0	0	0	0	1
14	MF	15	(Uruguay) Ignacio Rivero	1	0	0	0	0	1
14	DF	22	(Mexico) Jorge Rodarte	0	1	0	0	0	1
14	DF	2	(Mexico) Jorge Sánchez	1	0	0	0	0	1
Total				28	25	3	6	1	63

=== Clean sheets ===
Rank	No.	Player	Liga MX Apertura	Liga MX Clausura	Leagues Cup	Champions Cup	FIFA Intercontinental Cup	Total
1	23	(Colombia) Kevin Mier	5	2	0	0	0	7
2	1	(Mexico) Andrés Gudiño	1	4	0	0	0	5
3	30	(Mexico) Emmanuel Ochoa	0	0	0	2	0	2
Total			6	6	0	2	0	14

=== Disciplinary record ===
No.	Pos.	Player	Liga MX Apertura			Liga MX Clausura			Leagues Cup			Champions Cup			FIFA Intercontinental Cup			Total		
No.	Pos.	Player	Yellow card	(yellow card) (yellow-red card)	Red card	Yellow card	(yellow card) (yellow-red card)	Red card	Yellow card	(yellow card) (yellow-red card)	Red card	Yellow card	(yellow card) (yellow-red card)	Red card	Yellow card	(yellow card) (yellow-red card)	Red card	Yellow card	(yellow card) (yellow-red card)	Red card
1	GK	(Mexico) Andrés Gudiño	1	0	0	3	0	0	0	0	0	0	0	0	0	0	0	4	0	0
2	DF	(Mexico) Jorge Sánchez	1	0	0	0	0	0	0	0	0	0	0	0	0	0	0	1	0	0
3	DF	(Mexico) Omar Campos	0	0	0	3	0	0	0	0	0	0	0	0	0	0	0	3	0	0
4	DF	(Colombia) Willer Ditta	4	0	0	7	0	0	2	0	0	2	0	0	1	0	0	16	0	0
5	DF	(Mexico) Jesús Orozco	0	1	1	0	0	0	0	0	0	0	0	0	0	0	0	0	1	1
6	MF	(Mexico) Érik Lira	4	0	0	4	0	0	1	0	0	0	0	0	0	0	0	9	0	0
7	FW	(Argentina) Nicolás Ibáñez	0	0	0	2	0	0	0	0	0	0	0	0	0	0	0	2	0	0
7	MF	(Poland) Mateusz Bogusz	2	0	0	0	0	0	0	0	0	0	0	0	0	0	0	2	0	0
8	MF	(Argentina) Agustín Palavecino	0	0	0	7	0	0	0	0	0	2	0	0	0	0	0	9	0	0
8	MF	(Argentina) Lorenzo Faravelli	1	0	1	0	0	0	0	0	0	0	0	0	0	0	0	1	0	1
9	FW	(Mexico) Ángel Sepúlveda	1	0	0	0	0	0	0	0	0	0	0	0	0	0	0	1	0	0
10	MF	(Mexico) Andrés Montaño	0	0	0	1	0	0	0	0	0	0	0	0	0	0	0	1	0	0
11	FW	(Nigeria) Christian Ebere	0	0	0	1	0	0	0	0	0	0	0	0	0	0	0	1	0	0
15	MF	(Uruguay) Ignacio Rivero	6	0	0	0	0	0	2	0	0	0	0	0	0	0	0	8	0	0
16	MF	(Mexico) Jeremy Márquez	4	0	0	2	0	0	2	0	0	1	0	0	0	0	0	9	0	0
17	MF	(Mexico) Amaury García	1	0	0	3	0	0	0	0	0	1	0	0	0	0	0	5	0	0
18	MF	(Argentina) Luka Romero	0	0	1	2	0	0	0	0	0	0	0	0	0	0	0	2	0	1
19	MF	(Mexico) Carlos Rodríguez	3	0	0	1	0	0	0	0	0	1	0	0	0	0	0	5	0	0
20	MF	(Argentina) José Paradela	3	0	0	3	0	0	1	0	0	2	0	0	0	0	0	9	0	0
21	FW	(Uruguay) Gabriel Fernández	1	0	0	0	0	1	0	0	0	1	0	0	0	0	0	2	0	1
22	DF	(Mexico) Jorge Rodarte	1	0	1	2	0	0	0	0	0	1	0	0	0	0	0	4	0	1
29	MF	(Argentina) Carlos Rotondi	3	0	0	2	0	0	0	0	0	2	0	0	0	0	0	7	0	0
33	DF	(Argentina) Gonzalo Piovi	5	0	0	5	0	0	0	0	0	3	0	1	1	0	0	14	0	1
193	MF	(Mexico) Jaziel Mendoza (Note: Player registered with the under-21 team.)	1	0	0	0	0	0	0	0	0	0	0	0	0	0	0	1	0	0
214	FW	(Mexico) Mateo Levy	0	0	0	1	0	0	0	0	0	0	0	0	0	0	0	1	0	0
Total			42	1	4	49	0	1	8	0	0	16	0	1	2	0	0	117	1	6
