= Rogelio González =

Mexican footballer (born 2005)

Personal information
- Full name: Rogelio Andrés González Román
- Date of birth: 5 February 2005 (age 21)
- Place of birth: Coatzacoalcos, Veracruz, Mexico
- Height: 1.69 m (5 ft 7 in)
- Position: Attacking midfielder

Team information
- Current team: Cruz Azul Hidalgo
- Number: 55

Youth career
- 2022–: Cruz Azul

Senior career*
Years	Team	Apps	(Gls)
2026–	Cruz Azul	10	(1)
2026–	Cruz Azul Hidalgo	1	(0)

International career^{‡}
2024	Mexico U20	1	(1)
2026–	Mexico U23	2	(1)
Medal record
Men's football
Representing Mexico
Central American and Caribbean Games
Silver medal – second place	2026 Santo Domingo
- * Club domestic league appearances and goals as of 1 November 2026 ‡ National team caps and goals as of 1 November 2026

Rogelio Andrés González Román (born 5 February 2005), commonly known as Roger, is a Mexican professional footballer who plays as an attacking midfielder for Liga de Expansión MX club Cruz Azul Hidalgo.

== Club career ==
=== Cruz Azul ===
Born in Coatzacoalcos, Veracruz, González joined Cruz Azul in 2021 at the age of 15 and began playing for the club's under-16 side in the Clausura 2022. He went on to represent the under-18, under-19, under-21 and under-23 teams, and was coached by Joel Huiqui at under-21 level. During his time in the academy, he spent a period out with a ligament rupture. In September 2024, he appeared for the first team, then managed by Martín Anselmi, in a friendly against Alebrijes de Oaxaca, in which he scored.

González made his Liga MX debut on 17 January 2026, coming on as an 82nd-minute substitute for José Paradela in a 1–0 win over Puebla on the third matchday of the Clausura 2026. He continued to play for the under-21 side during the tournament, starting all ten of his matches.

Ahead of the 2026–27 season, he was registered with Cruz Azul Hidalgo, the club's reserve team in the Liga de Expansión MX, while remaining eligible for the first team. Huiqui, by then the first-team manager, gave him his first league start on 28 August 2026, away to Necaxa, playing him at right-back for 73 minutes before replacing him with Jorge Rodarte. On 17 October, he scored his first professional goal, the last in a 5–0 home win over Juárez on the twelfth matchday of the Apertura 2026, with a shot from outside the penalty area. He dislocated his right shoulder while celebrating the goal and was treated on the pitch.

== International career ==
González has represented Mexico at under-20 and under-21 level, scoring two goals in five matches across both age groups.

== Style of play ==
Although registered as an attacking midfielder, González can play on either wing, and has also been used as a central midfielder or at right-back.

== Career statistics ==
As of match played on 1 November 2026

Appearances and goals by club, season and competition
Club	Season	League			Continental		Other		Total	
Club	Season	Division	Apps	Goals	Apps	Goals	Apps	Goals	Apps	Goals
Cruz Azul	2025–26	Liga MX	1	0	—		—		1	0
Cruz Azul	2026–27	Liga MX	9	1	—		—		9	1
Cruz Azul	Total		10	1	—		—		10	1
Cruz Azul Hidalgo	2026–27	Liga de Expansión MX	1	0	—		—		1	0
Career total			11	1	0	0	0	0	11	1

== Honours ==
Cruz Azul

- Liga MX: Clausura 2026
