= Christian Ebere =

Nigerian footballer (born 1998)

Personal information
- Full name: Christian Osinachi Ebere
- Date of birth: 4 April 1998 (age 28)
- Place of birth: Lagos, Nigeria
- Height: 1.79 m (5 ft 10 in)
- Position: Winger

Team information
- Current team: Cruz Azul
- Number: 11

Youth career
- ASJ Academy
- 2017–2019: Rosario Central
- 2019–2020: Juventude

Senior career*
Years	Team	Apps	(Gls)
2020–2023	Fluminense	0	(0)
2021	→ Metropolitano (loan)	11	(1)
2021	→ Maringá (loan)	7	(2)
2021	→ Paraná (loan)	14	(3)
2022	→ Pouso Alegre (loan)	11	(1)
2022	→ Vila Nova (loan)	1	(0)
2022	→ Plaza Colonia (loan)	15	(2)
2023–2024	Plaza Colonia	50	(19)
2024–2026	Nacional	19	(4)
2025	→ Plaza Colonia (loan)	22	(1)
2026–	Cruz Azul	29	(7)

International career^{‡}
2015	Nigeria U17	5	(1)
Medal record
Men's football
Representing Nigeria
FIFA U-17 World Cup
Winner	2015 Chile
- * Club domestic league appearances and goals as of 9 November 2026 ‡ National team caps and goals as of 8 November 2015

Osinachi Christian Ebere (born 4 April 1998) is a Nigerian professional footballer who plays as a winger or forward for Liga MX club Cruz Azul. Besides Nigeria, he has played in Argentina, Brazil, and Uruguay.

== Club career ==
=== Early career and Fluminense ===
Ebere began his career in Nigeria at the ASJ Academy before moving to South America in 2017, joining the youth ranks of Rosario Central in Argentina. He subsequently moved to Brazil, where he played for Juventude's youth side before signing with Fluminense in December 2020.

He never played for Fluminense's first team, instead spending the whole of his contract out on loan. In 2021 he had spells at Metropolitano, Maringá and Paraná in Brazil's lower divisions. In 2022 he joined Pouso Alegre on loan, where he became the first Nigerian player to score in the Copa do Brasil, netting in a 2–0 first-round win over Paraná. A brief loan at Vila Nova followed before he moved to Uruguay on loan with Plaza Colonia in July 2022.

=== Plaza Colonia and Nacional ===
Ebere's move to Plaza Colonia was made permanent, and he became the club's most productive attacker over the following two seasons, scoring 17 league goals in 2023. In January 2024, Nacional agreed a deal worth just over US$300,000 for around 30 percent of his economic rights, with Plaza Colonia retaining the remainder and Ebere joining initially on a season-long loan.

He scored on his Copa Libertadores debut for Nacional, converting a penalty against Academia Puerto Cabello in the first-leg of the second phase to become the first Nigerian player to score in the competition's history. A knee injury and squad restrictions on foreign players led Nacional to loan him back to Plaza Colonia on two further occasions, before he returned to Nacional in mid-2025.

Although a fringe player for much of Nacional's 2025 campaign, Ebere came off the bench to score the extra-time winner in a 1–0 victory over rivals Peñarol on 30 November 2025, sealing Nacional's fiftieth league title.

=== Cruz Azul ===
On 6 February 2026, Cruz Azul announced the signing of Ebere on a three-year contract, becoming the first Nigerian player in the club's history. He made his debut on 7 February coming on for Mateo Levy in the 64th minute against defending champions Toluca. He set up the equaliser, his rebounded shot falling to José Paradela, who scored in the 77th minute of a 1–1 away draw. During the liguilla, with regular starter Gabriel Fernández injured, he started the first-leg of the quarter-finals against Atlas on 2 May and scored twice—from an Omar Campos cross in the 55th minute and from a penalty in the 87th—in a 3–2 win at Estadio Jalisco, becoming the first African player to score a brace in a Liga MX playoff match since the format's introduction in 1970 and earning the Player of the Match award. He scored again from the penalty spot in the first-leg of the semi-finals against Guadalajara, a 2–2 draw, before Cruz Azul won the second-leg 2–1 to advance 4–3 on aggregate. In the final against Pumas UNAM, Ebere started both legs; after a goalless first-leg, Pumas took an early lead in the second-leg at Estadio Olímpico Universitario on 24 May. Cruz Azul equalised in the 54th minute when Carlos Rotondi's cross, intended for Ebere, deflected off a defender for an own goal. Rotondi scored the winner in the fifth minute of stoppage time to secure a 2–1 victory and the club's tenth league title.

== International career ==
Ebere played for Nigeria at under-17 level, scoring in the semi-final of the 2015 FIFA U-17 World Cup as Nigeria came from behind to beat Mexico 4–2 in Concepción, Chile and reach the final. He started the final against Mali on 8 November 2015, missing an early penalty that was saved by goalkeeper Samuel Diarra, before Nigeria won 2–0 through second-half goals from Victor Osimhen and Funsho Bamgboye to claim a fifth U-17 world title.

== Career statistics ==
As of match played on 7 November 2026

Appearances and goals by club, season and competition
Club	Season	League			State league (Note: Includes Campeonato Catarinense, Campeonato Paranaense, Campeonato Mineiro)		National cup (Note: Includes Copa do Brasil, Copa Uruguay)		Continental (Note: Includes Copa Libertadores, CONCACAF Champions Cup)		Other		Total	
Club	Season	Division	Apps	Goals	Apps	Goals	Apps	Goals	Apps	Goals	Apps	Goals	Apps	Goals
Metropolitano (loan)	2021	—			11	1	—		—		—		11	1
Maringá (loan)	2021	—			7	2	—		—		—		7	2
Paraná (loan)	2021	Série C	14	3	—		—		—		—		14	3
Pouso Alegre (loan)	2022	Série D	0	0	11	1	2	1	—		—		13	2
Vila Nova (loan)	2022	Série B	1	0	—		—		—		—		1	0
Plaza Colonia (loan)	2022	Primera División	15	2	—		3	0	—		—		18	2
Plaza Colonia	2023	Primera División	35	17	—		0	0	—		—		35	17
Plaza Colonia	Total		50	19	—		3	0	0	0	0	0	53	19
Nacional	2023	Primera División	—		—		1	0	—		—		1	0
Nacional	2024	Primera División	10	2	—		0	0	8	1	—		18	3
Nacional	2025	Primera División	9	2	—		1	1	—		—		10	3
Nacional	Total		19	4	—		2	1	8	1	0	0	29	6
Plaza Colonia (loan)	2025	Primera División	22	1	—		—		—		—		22	1
Cruz Azul	2025–26	Liga MX	16	4	—		—		3	0	—		19	4
Cruz Azul	2026–27	Liga MX	13	3	—		—		0	0	2 (Note: One appearance in Campeón de Campeones, one appearance in Campeones Cup)	0	15	3
Cruz Azul	Total		29	7	—		0	0	3	0	2	0	34	7
Career total			135	34	29	4	7	2	11	1	2	0	184	41

== Honours ==
Nacional

- Uruguayan Primera División: 2025
- Torneo Intermedio: 2024

Cruz Azul

- Liga MX: Clausura 2026
- Campeón de Campeones: 2026

Nigeria U17

- FIFA U-17 World Cup: 2015
