= Eduardo Navarro =

Eduardo Navarro may refer to:

- Eduardo Navarro (artist) (born 1979), Argentinian artist
- Eduardo Navarro (footballer, born 1979), Spanish footballer
- Eduardo Navarro (footballer, born 2004), Mexican footballer
- Eduardo Navarro Quelquejeu (born 1960), Panamanian painter and sculptor
- Eduardo de Almeida Navarro, Brazilian philologist and lexicographer
