= Jeremy Márquez =

Mexican footballer (born 2000)

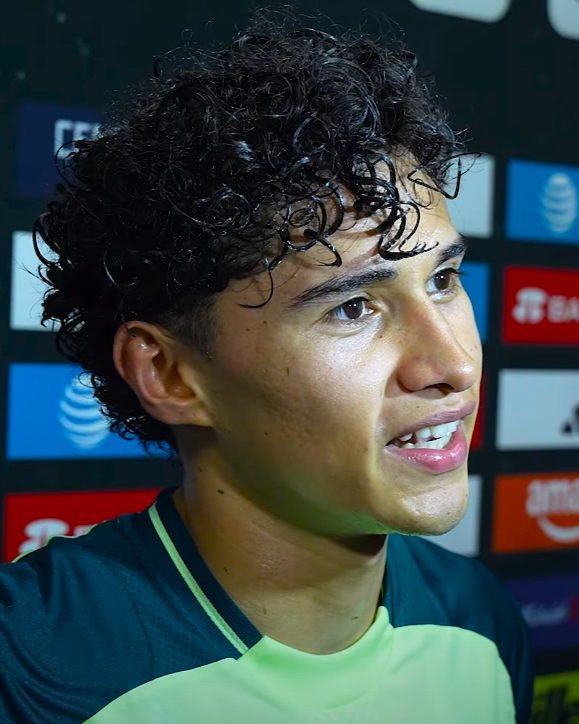
- Márquez with Mexico in 2025

Personal information
- Full name: Ángel Jeremy Márquez Castañeda
- Date of birth: 21 June 2000 (age 26)
- Place of birth: Guadalajara, Jalisco, Mexico
- Height: 1.77 m (5 ft 10 in)
- Position: Midfielder

Team information
- Current team: Cruz Azul
- Number: 16

Youth career
- 2012–2019: Atlas

Senior career*
Years	Team	Apps	(Gls)
2019–2025	Atlas	172	(12)
2025–	Cruz Azul	53	(9)

International career^{‡}
2023	Mexico U23	2	(0)
2026–	Mexico	3	(0)
- * Club domestic league appearances and goals as of 7 November 2026 ‡ National team caps and goals as of 6 October 2026

Ángel Jeremy Márquez Castañeda (born 21 June 2000) is a Mexican professional footballer who plays as a midfielder for Liga MX club Cruz Azul and the Mexico national team.

== Club career ==
=== Atlas ===
Márquez is a product of the Atlas youth academy. He made his professional debut in Liga MX on 11 January 2020 against Cruz Azul, where he also scored his first professional goal in a 2–1 victory. He became a fundamental part of the squad that achieved the historic Bicampeonato (back-to-back champions), winning both the Apertura 2021 and Clausura 2022 titles.

=== Cruz Azul ===
On 10 July 2025, Márquez officially joined Cruz Azul on a definitive transfer for a reported fee of approximately $5 million. He signed a four-year contract keeping him at the club until June 2029. Two days later, he made his debut for the club against Mazatlán during the Apertura 2025 tournament under manager Nicolás Larcamón.

== International career ==
=== Youth ===
Márquez has represented Mexico at the youth level, notably with the under-23 national team. On 10 October 2023, he was called up for a series of friendly matches to prepare for the 2023 Pan American Games, making an appearance in a match against the United States.

=== Senior ===
Márquez received his first call-up to the senior Mexico national team on 10 January 2025. He made his non-FIFA unofficial debut in a friendly match against Brazilian club Internacional on 16 January.

== Career statistics ==
=== Club ===
As of match played on 7 November 2026

Appearances and goals by club, season and competition
Club	Season	League			Copa MX		Continental (Note: Includes CONCACAF Champions League/Cup)		Other		Total	
Club	Season	Division	Apps	Goals	Apps	Goals	Apps	Goals	Apps	Goals	Apps	Goals
Atlas	2019–20	Liga MX	9	1	1	0	—		—		10	1
Atlas	2020–21	Liga MX	27	1	—		—		—		27	1
Atlas	2021–22	Liga MX	40	2	—		—		1 (Note: Appearance in Campeón de Campeones)	0	41	2
Atlas	2022–23	Liga MX	33	1	—		2	0	2 (Note: One appearance in Campeones Cup, one appearance in Leagues Cup)	0	37	1
Atlas	2023–24	Liga MX	30	2	—		—		—		30	2
Atlas	2024–25	Liga MX	33	5	—		—		3 (Note: Appearances in Leagues Cup)	0	36	5
Atlas	Total		172	12	1	0	2	0	6	0	181	12
Cruz Azul	2025–26	Liga MX	39	6	—		6	0	4 (Note: Three appearances in Leagues Cup, one appearance in FIFA Intercontinental Cup)	0	49	6
Cruz Azul	2026–27	Liga MX	14	3	—		—		5 (Note: One appearance in Campeón de Campeones, three appearances in Leagues Cup, one appearance in Campeones Cup)	0	19	3
Cruz Azul	Total		53	9	—		6	0	9	0	68	9
Career total			225	21	1	0	8	0	15	0	249	21

=== International ===
As of match played on 6 October 2026

Appearances and goals by national team and year
National team	Year	Apps	Goals
Mexico	2026	3	0
Total		3	0

== Honours ==
Atlas

- Liga MX: Apertura 2021, Clausura 2022
- Campeón de Campeones: 2022

Cruz Azul

- Liga MX: Clausura 2026
- Campeón de Campeones: 2026
