= Emmanuel Ochoa =

Professional footballer (born 2005)

Personal information
- Full name: Emmanuel Ochoa
- Date of birth: 5 May 2005 (age 21)
- Place of birth: Salinas, California, United States
- Height: 1.91 m (6 ft 3 in)
- Position: Goalkeeper

Team information
- Current team: Cruz Azul
- Number: 30

Youth career
- El Camino
- 2017–2019: Santa Cruz Breakers
- 2019–2024: San Jose Earthquakes

Senior career*
| Years | Team | Apps | (Gls) |
| 2021–2024 | San Jose Earthquakes | 0 | (0) |
| 2022–2024 | → The Town FC | 44 | (0) |
| 2025– | Cruz Azul | 0 | (0) |
| 2026– | → Cruz Azul Hidalgo | 8 | (0) |

International career^{‡}
| 2019 | United States U15 | 3 | (0) |
| 2021 | Mexico U18 | 1 | (0) |
| 2022 | United States U19 | 2 | (0) |
| 2024–2025 | Mexico U20 | 12 | (0) |
Medal record
Men's football
Representing Mexico
CONCACAF U-20 Championship
| Winner | 2024 Mexico |
Central American and Caribbean Games
| Silver medal – second place | 2026 Santo Domingo |
- * Club domestic league appearances and goals as of 31 October 2026 ‡ National team caps and goals as of 01:05, 11 October 2025 (UTC)

Emmanuel "Emi" Ochoa (born 5 May 2005) is a professional footballer who plays as a goalkeeper for Liga MX club Cruz Azul. Born in the United States, he is a youth international for Mexico.

== Club career ==
=== Early career ===
Born in Salinas, California, Ochoa started his career with local side El Camino before joining the Santa Cruz Breakers.

=== San Jose Earthquakes ===
He joined the San Jose Earthquakes academy in 2019, before being promoted to the first team ahead of the 2020 season.

Ochoa made national sports headlines in November 2019 when, at only 14 years and 191 days old, he signed as a Homegrown Player for the San Jose Earthquakes, making him the youngest ever Homegrown Player in Major League Soccer history. He is also the second youngest player to register for an MLS team, behind Freddy Adu, and at the time of his signing was considered to be the best goalkeeper of his age group in the country.

=== Cruz Azul ===
On 17 January 2025, Cruz Azul announced the signing of Ochoa. He made his debut on 6 February 2026, keeping a clean sheet in a 3–0 away victory over Canadian side Vancouver FC during the CONCACAF Champions Cup.

== International career ==
Born in the United States, Ochoa is of Mexican descent. He has represented the United States at under-14 and under-15 level. He is also eligible to represent Mexico. On March 9, 2020, Ochoa received a call up to the Mexico U-16 side, his first for any of Mexico's national team squads. He played in a scrimmage match against the youth team of Puebla on March 12, 2020.

In August 2021, Ochoa was called up to the Mexico under-18 squad, and made his debut in a 2–1 loss to the Republic of Ireland under-17s.

In 2025, Ochoa was called up by coach Eduardo Arce to represent Mexico at the FIFA U-20 World Cup held in Chile.

== Career statistics ==
As of match played on 31 October 2026

Appearances and goals by club, season and competition
| Club | Season | League | | | National cup (Note: Includes U.S. Open Cup) | | Continental (Note: Includes CONCACAF Champions Cup) | | Other | | Total | |
| Club | Season | Division | Apps | Goals | Apps | Goals | Apps | Goals | Apps | Goals | Apps | Goals |
|---|---|---|---|---|---|---|---|---|---|---|---|---|
| San Jose Earthquakes | 2021 | MLS | — | | — | | — | | — | | — | |
| San Jose Earthquakes | 2024 | MLS | — | | 1 | 0 | — | | — | | 1 | 0 |
| San Jose Earthquakes | Total | | — | | 1 | 0 | — | | — | | 1 | 0 |
| The Town FC | 2022 | MLS Next Pro | 15 | 0 | — | | — | | — | | 15 | 0 |
| The Town FC | 2023 | MLS Next Pro | 18 | 0 | — | | — | | 2 | 0 | 20 | 0 |
| The Town FC | 2024 | MLS Next Pro | 11 | 0 | — | | — | | 2 | 0 | 13 | 0 |
| The Town FC | Total | | 44 | 0 | — | | — | | 4 | 0 | 48 | 0 |
| Cruz Azul | 2025–26 | Liga MX | — | | — | | 2 | 0 | — | | 2 | 0 |
| Cruz Azul Hidalgo (loan) | 2026–27 | Liga de Expansión MX | 8 | 0 | — | | — | | — | | 8 | 0 |
| Career total | | | 52 | 0 | 1 | 0 | 2 | 0 | 4 | 0 | 59 | 0 |

== Honours ==
Cruz Azul

- Liga MX: Clausura 2026
- CONCACAF Champions Cup: 2025
- Campeón de Campeones: 2026

Mexico

- CONCACAF U-20 Championship: 2024
