= Amaury García (footballer) =

Mexican footballer (born 2001)

Personal information
- Full name: Amaury García Moreno
- Date of birth: 19 December 2001 (age 24)
- Place of birth: Tlalpan, Mexico City, Mexico
- Height: 1.84 m (6 ft 0 in)
- Position: Midfielder

Team information
- Current team: Cruz Azul
- Number: 17

Youth career
- 2014–2020: Pumas UNAM

Senior career*
Years	Team	Apps	(Gls)
2020–2024	Pumas UNAM	17	(0)
2022–2023	→ Pumas Tabasco (loan)	13	(1)
2024–	Cruz Azul	40	(0)

International career^{‡}
2021	Mexico U21	1	(0)
- * Club domestic league appearances and goals as of 1 November 2026 ‡ National team caps and goals as of 11 October 2021

Amaury García Moreno (born 19 December 2001) is a Mexican professional footballer who plays as a midfielder for Liga MX club Cruz Azul.

== Early life ==
García was born in Tlalpan, Mexico City, on 19 December 2001. He spent about twelve years in Pumas UNAM's youth academy, progressing through the club's age-group categories and winning a title with the under-19 side.

== Club career ==
=== Pumas UNAM ===
García made his first-team debut in the Copa MX on 31 July 2019, coming on as a substitute and scoring the equaliser in a 1–1 draw against Atlético San Luis. He made his Liga MX debut on 3 August 2020, replacing Juan Dinenno in the closing minutes of a 2–1 win at Atlas.

==== Loan to Pumas Tabasco ====
García was loaned to Pumas Tabasco of the Liga de Expansión MX in 2022, spending two seasons with the club and scoring once in 13 appearances before returning to Pumas UNAM.

=== Cruz Azul ===
After Pumas UNAM opted not to renew his contract, García signed for Cruz Azul as a free agent in June 2024, agreeing to a three-year deal. Initially assigned to the club's under-23 side, he made his first-team debut on 6 July 2024, replacing Carlos Rodríguez in a 1–0 win over Mazatlán on the opening matchday of the Apertura 2024. He remained a squad rotation option through his first season, making occasional continental appearances as Cruz Azul won the CONCACAF Champions Cup, the first major title of his career.

García continued in a limited role through the 2025–26 season, but broke into the starting lineup during the Clausura 2026 playoffs after team captain Érik Lira was called into Mexico's concentration for the 2026 FIFA World Cup and missed the rest of the tournament. Deputising for Lira in defensive midfield, García started through the playoffs, including the final against Pumas UNAM, as Cruz Azul won the Clausura 2026 title.

== International career ==
García has been part of Mexico's under-18, under-19, under-20, and under-21 setups. He was called up to the under-20 squad in 2020 for a training microcycle ahead of a friendly against Guatemala, and earned a single cap for the under-21 side in 2021.

== Career statistics ==
As of match played on 1 November 2026

Club	Season	League			National cup (Note: Includes Copa MX)		Continental (Note: Includes CONCACAF Champions Cup)		Other		Total	
Club	Season	Division	Apps	Goals	Apps	Goals	Apps	Goals	Apps	Goals	Apps	Goals
Pumas UNAM	2019–20	Liga MX	—		5	1	—		—		5	1
Pumas UNAM	2020–21	Liga MX	10	0	—		—		—		10	0
Pumas UNAM	2021–22	Liga MX	6	0	—		—		—		6	0
Pumas UNAM	2022–23	Liga MX	1	0	—		—		—		1	0
Pumas UNAM	Total		17	0	5	1	—		—		22	1
Pumas Tabasco (loan)	2021–22	Liga de Expansión MX	1	0	—		—		—		1	0
Pumas Tabasco (loan)	2022–23	Liga de Expansión MX	12	1	—		—		—		12	1
Pumas Tabasco (loan)	Total		13	1	—		—		—		13	1
Cruz Azul	2024–25	Liga MX	6	0	—		2	0	—		8	0
Cruz Azul	2025–26	Liga MX	23	0	—		4	0	—		27	0
Cruz Azul	2026–27	Liga MX	11	0	—		—		1 (Note: Appearance in Campeones Cup)	0	12	0
Cruz Azul	Total		40	0	—		6	0	1	0	47	0
Career total			70	1	5	1	6	0	1	0	82	2

== Honours ==
Cruz Azul

- Liga MX: Clausura 2026
- Campeón de Campeones: 2026
- CONCACAF Champions Cup: 2025
