= Willer Ditta =

Colombian footballer (born 1997)

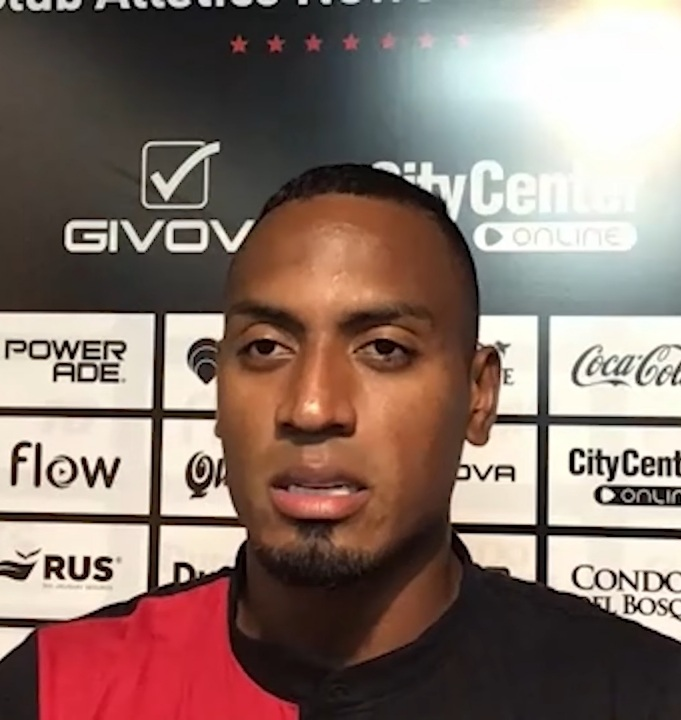
- Ditta in 2022

Personal information
- Full name: Willer Emilio Ditta Pérez
- Date of birth: 23 January 1998 (age 28)
- Place of birth: Ibirico, Colombia
- Height: 1.80 m (5 ft 11 in)
- Position: Centre-back

Team information
- Current team: Cruz Azul
- Number: 4

Senior career*
Years	Team	Apps	(Gls)
2017–2018	Barranquilla	43	(1)
2018–2023	Atlético Junior	86	(1)
2022	→ Newell's Old Boys (loan)	36	(3)
2022–2023	Newell's Old Boys	17	(0)
2023–	Cruz Azul	127	(3)

International career^{‡}
2019–2020	Colombia U23	6	(0)
2023–	Colombia	5	(0)
- * Club domestic league appearances and goals as of 16:35, 8 November 2026 (UTC) ‡ National team caps and goals as of 23:12, 7 June 2026 (UTC)

Willer Emilio Ditta Pérez (born 23 January 1998) is a Colombian professional footballer who plays as a centre-back for Liga MX club Cruz Azul and the Colombia national team.

Ditta began his career with Barranquilla before joining Junior in 2018, where he won two Categoría Primera A titles and two Superliga Colombiana trophies. In 2022, he moved to Argentine side Newell's Old Boys on loan, making the transfer permanent the following year. Later in 2023, he joined Mexican club Cruz Azul, where he won the 2025 CONCACAF Champions Cup and the Torneo Clausura the following year.

Ditta represented Colombia at under-23 level in the 2020 CONMEBOL Pre-Olympic Tournament and made his senior debut in 2023.

== Career ==
Ditta began his football career at Barranquilla, where he emerged as a promising talent from the youth academy. He made his professional debut in 2018 before transferring to Atlético Junior, where he achieved significant success by winning two Primera A titles.

In January 2022, Ditta joined Newell's Old Boys on loan. Later that year, in November, Newell's exercised their purchase option to acquire him permanently, and he subsequently signed a three-year contract with the club.

On 6 July 2023, he joined Cruz Azul. In June 2025, he helped the club secure their seventh CONCACAF Champions Cup title with a dominant victory over the Vancouver Whitecaps FC.

== Career statistics ==
=== Club ===
As of match played on 7 November 2026

Appearances and goals by club, season and competition
Club	Season	League			National cup		Continental		Other		Total	
Club	Season	Division	Apps	Goals	Apps	Goals	Apps	Goals	Apps	Goals	Apps	Goals
Barranquilla	2017	Categoría Primera B	28	0	5 (Note: Appearances in the Copa Colombia)	0	—		—		33	0
Barranquilla	2018	Categoría Primera B	15	1	4	0	—		—		19	1
Barranquilla	Total		43	1	9	0	—		—		52	1
Atlético Junior	2018	Categoría Primera A	9	0	3	0	4 (Note: Appearances in the Copa Sudamericana)	0	—		16	0
Atlético Junior	2019	Categoría Primera A	35	0	1	0	5 (Note: Appearances in the Copa Libertadores)	0	—		41	0
Atlético Junior	2020	Categoría Primera A	11	0	3 (Note: Appearances in the Superliga Colombiana)	0	2	0	—		16	0
Atlético Junior	2021	Categoría Primera A	31	1	1	0	10	1	—		42	2
Atlético Junior	Total		86	1	8	0	21	1	—		115	2
Newell's Old Boys (loan)	2022	Primera División	36	3	3 (Note: Appearances in the Copa Argentina.)	0	—		—		39	3
Newell's Old Boys	2023	Primera División	17	0	1	0	4	0	—		22	0
Newell's Old Boys	Total		53	3	4	0	4	0	—		61	3
Cruz Azul	2023–24	Liga MX	33	2	—		—		2 (Note: Appearances in Leagues Cup)	0	35	2
Cruz Azul	2024–25	Liga MX	40	0	—		8 (Note: Appearances in CONCACAF Champions Cup)	0	4	1	52	1
Cruz Azul	2025–26	Liga MX	43	0	—		5	0	4 (Note: Three appearances and one goal in Leagues Cup, one appearance in FIFA Intercontinental Cup)	1	52	1
Cruz Azul	2026–27	Liga MX	11	1	—		0	0	5 (Note: One appearance in Campeón de Campeones, three appearances in Leagues Cup, one appearance in Campeones Cup)	0	16	1
Cruz Azul	Total		127	3	—		13	0	15	2	155	5
Career total			309	8	21	0	38	1	15	2	383	11

=== International ===
As of match played on 7 June 2026

Appearances and goals by national team and year
National team	Year	Apps	Goals
Colombia	2023	1	0
Colombia	2024	1	0
Colombia	2025	1	0
Colombia	2026	2	0
Total		5	0

== Honours ==
Atlético Junior

- Categoría Primera A: 2018–II, 2019–I
- Superliga Colombiana: 2019, 2020

Cruz Azul

- Liga MX: Clausura 2026
- Campeón de Campeones: 2026
- CONCACAF Champions Cup: 2025

Individual

- Liga MX Best XI: Apertura 2025, Clausura 2026
- Liga MX Player of the Month: February 2026
- Liga MX All-Star: 2025, 2026
