= Kevin Mier =

Colombian footballer

Personal information
- Full name: Kevin Leonardo Mier Robles
- Date of birth: 18 May 2000 (age 26)
- Place of birth: Barrancabermeja, Santander, Colombia
- Height: 1.90 m (6 ft 3 in)
- Position: Goalkeeper

Team information
- Current team: Cruz Azul
- Number: 23

Youth career
- 2008–2018: Oro Negro
- 2018–2019: Atlético Nacional

Senior career*
Years	Team	Apps	(Gls)
2019–2023	Atlético Nacional	54	(0)
2019	→ Santa Fe (loan)	0	(0)
2020	→ Valledupar (loan)	16	(0)
2024–	Cruz Azul	101	(0)

International career^{‡}
2015	Colombia U15	1	(0)
2017	Colombia U17	13	(0)
2018–2019	Colombia U20	14	(0)
2018	Colombia U21	2	(0)
2025–	Colombia	4	(0)
- * Club domestic league appearances and goals as of 12:03, 10 November 2026 (UTC) ‡ National team caps and goals as of 22:20, 6 October 2026 (UTC)

Kevin Leonardo Mier Robles (born 18 May 2000) is a Colombian professional footballer who plays as a goalkeeper for Liga MX club Cruz Azul and the Colombia national team.

Mier began his career at Atlético Nacional, making his senior debut in 2019. That same year he spent a brief loan spell at Santa Fe, followed in 2020 by a loan at Valledupar to gain first-team experience. He later returned to Nacional, where he became first-choice goalkeeper and won multiple domestic trophies, including the Copa Colombia in 2021 and 2023, the Categoría Primera A in 2022, and the Superliga Colombiana in 2023. In January 2024, he moved to Cruz Azul in Mexico, where he helped the team win the CONCACAF Champions Cup in 2025. His performances earned him the tournament's Best Goalkeeper award.

At international level, Mier represented Colombia U17, winning the Bolivarian Games in 2017, and the Colombia U21, winning the Central American and Caribbean Games in 2018, before making his senior debut for Colombia in 2025.

== Club career ==
=== Atlético Nacional ===
Mier is a youth product of his local club Oro Negro from the age of 4 to 14. He converted from forward to goalkeeper in 2011. On 18 January 2016 he transferred to Atlético Nacional signing a contract and was initially assigned to their youth team. He began his senior career with two successive loans, with Santa Fe in 2019 and Valledupar in 2020. He returned to Atlético Nacional for the 2021 season where he started acting as the starting goalkeeper, and extended his professional contract with the club in June 2022 until 2025. He helped the club win the 2021 Copa Colombia, the 2022 Categoría Primera A season Apertura, and the 2023 Superliga Colombiana, earning him attention from abroad.

=== Cruz Azul ===
==== Arrival and early impact ====
Kevin Leonardo Mier Robles's transfer to Cruz Azul was officially announced on 12 January 2024, for a reported fee of €3.2 million, approximately $3 million, from Colombian club Atlético Nacional. This acquisition held significant historical importance for Cruz Azul, as Mier became the club's first foreign goalkeeper in nearly three decades, ending a tradition of relying on homegrown Mexican goalkeepers since 1997.

Since Norberto Scoponi's departure, the club had predominantly relied on homegrown Mexican goalkeepers, including notable figures like Óscar Pérez and Jesús Corona. Upon his arrival, Mier quickly established himself as the team's starting goalkeeper, donning the number 23 jersey. His contract with Cruz Azul extends until 30 June 2029.

In the 2024 Liga MX Clausura season, Mier played a key role as Cruz Azul finished an impressive 2nd in the regular season table with 33 points. They successfully navigated the Liguilla, defeating UNAM 4–2 on aggregate in the quarter-finals. Mier was the starting goalkeeper in all Liguilla matches, including the final. Cruz Azul reached the championship final but ultimately lost to fierce rivals Club América with an aggregate score of 2–1, following a 1–1 draw in the first leg on 23 May 2024, and a 1–0 defeat in the second leg on 26 May 2024. Cruz Azul continued their strong form into the Apertura, topping the regular season table and finishing 1st with 42 points. They progressed to the semi-finals of the Liguilla, where they again faced Club América. After a 0–0 draw in the first leg, Cruz Azul lost the second leg 4–3.

==== 2025: Continental triumph and continued form ====
A notable display of his ball skills occurred in Matchweek 4 of the 2025 Clausura season on 29 January 2025, against Necaxa. With the score tied, a misjudged pass from a teammate put a Necaxa forward through on goal. Mier calmly rushed out and, instead of clearing the ball, executed a precise back-heel move to evade the initial pressure. He then continued to carry the ball forward, daring another opponent before performing a quick step-over and finally distributing the ball calmly near the center circle.

Mier was an absolutely pivotal figure in Cruz Azul's triumph in the 2025 CONCACAF Champions Cup, securing a major continental title for the club. In the semifinal, he was instrumental in keeping a strong Tigres UANL side scoreless in the decisive second leg on 2 May 2025, following a 1–1 draw in the first leg, helping Cruz Azul advance to the final.

In the final match, Cruz Azul delivered a convincing 5–0 victory over Canadian side Vancouver Whitecaps FC on 2 June 2025, with Mier notably securing a clean sheet, which was his fourth of the tournament. The Vancouver Whitecaps notably registered no shots on goal throughout the match, a testament to Cruz Azul's defensive solidity and Mier's commanding presence and organization from the back. His outstanding performances throughout the tournament, which included 3 clean sheets and 9 saves in 7 appearances, earned him the Best Goalkeeper Award.

== International career ==
At the age of 14, Mier was first called up to the Colombia U15s for the 2015 South American U-15 Championship, without making an appearance. He started for the Colombia U17s at the 2017 FIFA U-17 World Cup. He was also the starter for the Colombia U21s at in their winning campaign at the 2018 Central American and Caribbean Games, and was named best goalkeeper of the tournament.

== Style of play ==
Mier is known for his composure, reflexes, ball handling and footwork. He has been seen rushing out of goal to show his skill on the ball and to challenge his opponents. An agile and quick-thinking goalkeeper with the ability to play with his feet, Mier is regarded as a sweeper-keeper, and is oftentimes compared to Colombian legend, René Higuita who also helped train Mier during his time at Atlético Nacional.

== Personal life ==
Whenever a game ends, Mier kisses his glove and looks to the sky in honour of one of his cousins who died aged 17, and has the initials of his cousin tattooed on his hand. He is passionate about gastronomy, and has a bachelor's degree.

Mier is known to keep a figure of a Virgin in his goal during matches. First being seen during the 2023 Copa Colombia final against Millonarios where Mier's Atlético Nacional won on penalties with a score of 5–4, and later being seen throughout league matches of the 2024 Liga MX Clausura.

== Career statistics ==
=== Club ===
As of match played on 7 November 2026

Appearances and goals by club, season and competition
Club	Season	League			National cup		Continental		Other		Total	
Club	Season	Division	Apps	Goals	Apps	Goals	Apps	Goals	Apps	Goals	Apps	Goals
Atlético Nacional	2019	Categoría Primera A	0	0	0	0	0	0	—		0	0
Atlético Nacional	2021	Categoría Primera A	8	0	1	0	0	0	—		9	0
Atlético Nacional	2022	Categoría Primera A	41	0	3	0	2 (Note: Appearances in Copa Libertadores)	0	—		46	0
Atlético Nacional	2023	Categoría Primera A	37	0	6	0	4	0	2	0	49	0
Atlético Nacional	Total		86	0	10	0	6	0	2	0	104	0
Santa Fe (loan)	2019	Categoría Primera A	0	0	—		—		—		0	0
Valledupar (loan)	2020	Categoría Primera B	16	0	1	0	—		—		17	0
Cruz Azul	2023–24	Liga MX	23	0	—		—		—		23	0
Cruz Azul	2024–25	Liga MX	41	0	—		7 (Note: Appearances in CONCACAF Champions Cup)	0	4 (Note: Appearances in Leagues Cup)	0	52	0
Cruz Azul	2025–26	Liga MX	26	0	—		2	0	3	0	31	0
Cruz Azul	2026–27	Liga MX	11	0	—		0	0	5 (Note: One appearance in Campeón de Campeones, three appearances in Leagues Cup, one appearance in Campeones Cup)	0	16	0
Cruz Azul	Total		101	0	0	0	9	0	12	0	122	0
Career total			203	0	11	0	15	0	14	0	243	0

=== International ===
As of match played on 6 October 2026

Appearances and goals by national team and year
National team	Year	Apps	Goals
Colombia	2025	3	0
Colombia	2026	1	0
Total		4	0

== Honours ==
Atlético Nacional

- Categoría Primera A: 2022 Apertura
- Copa Colombia: 2021, 2023
- Superliga Colombiana: 2023

Cruz Azul

- Liga MX: Clausura 2026
- Campeón de Campeones: 2026
- CONCACAF Champions Cup: 2025
- FIFA Derby of the Americas runner-up: 2025

Colombia U17

- Bolivarian Games: 2017

Colombia U21

- Central American and Caribbean Games: 2018

Individual

- CONCACAF Champions Cup Best Goalkeeper: 2025
- Liga MX All-Star: 2024, 2025
