= Gonzalo Piovi =

Argentine footballer (born 1994)

Personal information
- Full name: Gonzalo Rubén Piovi
- Date of birth: 8 September 1994 (age 32)
- Place of birth: Morón, Argentina
- Height: 1.77 m (5 ft 10 in)
- Position: Left-back

Team information
- Current team: Cruz Azul
- Number: 33

Youth career
- Vélez Sarsfield

Senior career*
Years	Team	Apps	(Gls)
2013–2015	Vélez Sarsfield	2	(0)
2015–2018	Argentinos Juniors	35	(0)
2018–2023	Racing Club	65	(7)
2018–2019	→ Gimnasia y Esgrima (loan)	18	(0)
2019–2020	→ Defensa y Justicia (loan)	8	(0)
2020–2021	→ Colón (loan)	37	(2)
2024–	Cruz Azul	107	(0)
- * Club domestic league appearances and goals as of 7 November 2026

Gonzalo Rubén Piovi (born 8 September 1994) is an Argentine professional footballer who plays as a left-back for Liga MX club Cruz Azul.

== Club career ==
Piovi's professional career began in 2013 with Argentine Primera División side Vélez Sarsfield. He first appeared as an unused substitute in a league match against All Boys on 19 August, prior to making his debut in November versus Quilmes. Two more appearances followed for Vélez, including in the 2014 Copa Libertadores against The Strongest, before Piovi completed a transfer to fellow Primera División club Argentinos Juniors in January 2015. It took Piovi until March 2016 to make his bow for Argentinos, playing the full ninety minutes in a goalless draw with Temperley.

In June 2016, Piovi extended his contract with the club. However, on 29 January 2018, Piovi completed a move to Racing Club. Eight months later, after featuring in five matches for Racing Club, he departed the club on loan in August after agreeing to join Gimnasia y Esgrima. He featured in twenty-seven matches in all competitions for Gimnasia, whilst also scoring his first senior goal in a Copa de la Superliga win over Newell's Old Boys on 21 April 2019. A loan to fellow top-flight team Defensa y Justicia followed in July. His debut came in a Copa Argentina win over former club Gimnasia on 20 July.

After appearing nine times in one season with Defensa, the defender returned to his parent club in June 2020. A third loan out of Racing was confirmed on 30 August as Piovi agreed to join Colón.

On 23 December 2023, Piovi joined Liga MX side Cruz Azul.

== Personal life ==
Piovi's brother, Lucas, is also a professional footballer.

== Career statistics ==
As of match played on 7 November 2026

Appearances and goals by club, season and competition
Club	Season	League			National cup (Note: Includes Copa Argentina)		League cup (Note: Includes Copa de la Superliga)		Continental		Other		Total	
Club	Season	Division	Apps	Goals	Apps	Goals	Apps	Goals	Apps	Goals	Apps	Goals	Apps	Goals
Vélez Sarsfield	2013–14	Primera División	2	0	—		—		1 (Note: Appearance(s) in the Copa Libertadores)	0	—		3	0
Argentinos Juniors	2016	Primera División	11	0	—		—		—		—		11	0
Argentinos Juniors	2016–17	Primera B Nacional	11	0	1	0	—		—		—		12	0
Argentinos Juniors	2017–18	Primera División	13	0	—		—		—		—		13	0
Argentinos Juniors	Total		35	0	1	0	—		—		—		36	0
Racing Club	2017–18	Primera División	4	0	1	0	—		—		—		5	0
Racing Club	2022	Primera División	31	1	2	0	—		5 (Note: Appearance(s) in Copa Sudamericana)	0	2 (Note: Appearances in Trofeo de Campeones de la Liga Profesional)	0	40	1
Racing Club	2023	Primera División	30	6	2	1	—		8	3	1 (Note: Appearances in Supercopa Internacional)	1	41	11
Racing Club	Total		65	7	5	1	—		13	3	3	1	86	12
Gimnasia y Esgrima (loan)	2018–19	Primera División	18	0	3	0	6	1	—		—		27	1
Defensa y Justicia (loan)	2019–20	Primera División	8	0	1	0	—		—		—		9	0
Colón (loan)	2020–21	Primera División	6	0	2	0	—		—		—		8	0
Colón (loan)	2021	Primera División	31	2	—		—		—		—		31	2
Colón (loan)	Total		37	2	2	0	—		—		—		39	2
Cruz Azul	2023–24	Liga MX	23	0	—		—		—		—		23	0
Cruz Azul	2024–25	Liga MX	34	0	—		—		8 (Note: Appearances in CONCACAF Champions Cup)	0	4 (Note: Appearances in Leagues Cup)	0	46	0
Cruz Azul	2025–26	Liga MX	39	0	—		—		4	1	3 (Note: Two appearances in Leagues Cup, one appearance in FIFA Intercontinental Cup)	0	46	1
Cruz Azul	2026–27	Liga MX	11	0	—		—		—		5 (Note: One appearance in Campeón de Campeones, three appearances in Leagues Cup, one appearance in Campeones Cup)	0	16	0
Cruz Azul	Total		107	0	—		—		12	1	12	0	131	1
Career total			272	9	12	1	6	1	26	4	15	1	331	16

== Honours ==
Argentinos Juniors

- Primera B Nacional: 2016–17

Racing Club

- Trofeo de Campeones de la Liga Profesional: 2022

Cruz Azul

- Liga MX: Clausura 2026
- Campeón de Campeones: 2026
- CONCACAF Champions Cup: 2025

Individual

- Liga MX All-Star: 2024
