= Agustín Palavecino =

Argentine footballer

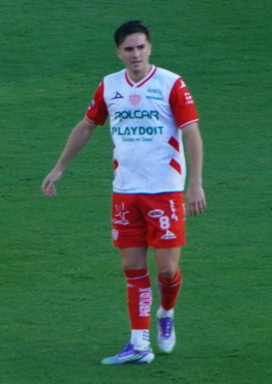
- Palavecino with Necaxa in 2025

Personal information
- Full name: Agustín Palavecino
- Date of birth: 9 November 1996 (age 30)
- Place of birth: Florida, Buenos Aires, Argentina
- Height: 1.79 m (5 ft 10 in)
- Position: Attacking midfielder

Team information
- Current team: Cruz Azul
- Number: 8

Youth career
- 2000–2015: Platense

Senior career*
Years	Team	Apps	(Gls)
2015–2019	Platense	101	(8)
2019–2021	Deportivo Cali	60	(16)
2021–2025	River Plate	104	(10)
2024–2025	→ Necaxa (loan)	36	(8)
2025	Necaxa	16	(2)
2025	→ Pachuca (loan)	0	(0)
2026–	Cruz Azul	37	(9)
- * Club domestic league appearances and goals as of 7 November 2026

Agustín Palavecino (born 9 November 1996) is an Argentine professional footballer who plays as an attacking midfielder for Liga MX club Cruz Azul.

== Club career ==
=== Early career and Platense ===
Born in Florida in the outskirts of Buenos Aires, Palavecino started playing in the indoor football section of Platense at the age of 4, and three years later he moved into the association football section of the aforementioned club, playing for the youth setup until his promotion to the senior team in 2015. He had his senior team debut on 11 March 2015, in a 0–0 draw with Barracas Central, and scored his first goal in a 2–1 win against Comunicaciones on 10 May 2015. Palavecino was instrumental in the club's promotion to Primera B Nacional by winning the 2017–18 Primera B Metropolitana championship.

=== Deportivo Cali ===
On 8 February 2019, Platense announced the transfer of Palavecino to Colombian club Deportivo Cali. He played his first match with the team on 24 February, entering as a substitute in the second half of Deportivo Cali's match against Independiente Medellín, which ended in a 1–1 draw.

=== River Plate ===
On 12 February 2021, Palavecino joined River Plate. He helped the club win the 2021 and 2023 Primera División.

=== Necaxa ===
On 25 June 2024, Palavecino joined Mexican club Necaxa on a one-year loan. On 14 July, he scored in his debut, in a 4–1 victory against Puebla. On 9 April 2025, the move became permanent after Necaxa acquired the player.

=== Cruz Azul ===
On 6 January 2026, he joined Cruz Azul on a three-year contract.

== Personal life ==
Palavecino is the cousin of former footballer Erik Lamela.

== Career statistics ==
As of match played on 7 November 2026

Appearances and goals by club, season and competition
Club	Season	League			National cup		Continental (Note: Includes appearances in Copa Sudamericana, Copa Libertadores, CONCACAF Champions Cup)		Other		Total	
Club	Season	Division	Apps	Goals	Apps	Goals	Apps	Goals	Apps	Goals	Apps	Goals
Platense	2015	Primera B Metropolitana	24	2	—		—		—		24	2
Platense	2016	Primera B Metropolitana	13	1	—		—		—		13	1
Platense	2016–17	Primera B Metropolitana	19	0	—		—		—		19	0
Platense	2017–18	Primera B Metropolitana	31	2	—		—		—		31	2
Platense	2018–19	Primera B Metropolitana	14	3	3	0	—		—		17	3
Platense	Total		101	8	3	0	—		—		104	8
Deportivo Cali	2019	Categoría Primera A	38	4	6	0	2	0	—		46	4
Deportivo Cali	2020	Categoría Primera A	19	10	—		6	3	—		25	13
Deportivo Cali	2021	Categoría Primera A	3	2	—		—		—		3	2
Deportivo Cali	Total		60	16	6	0	8	3	—		74	19
River Plate	2021	Primera División	34	5	2	0	7	0	2 (Note: One appearance in Supercopa Argentina, one appearance in Trofeo de Campeones)	0	45	5
River Plate	2022	Primera División	36	3	4	2	6	1	—		46	6
River Plate	2023	Primera División	28	2	2	0	7	0	—		37	2
River Plate	2024	Primera División	6	0	1	0	1	0	—		8	0
River Plate	Total		104	10	9	2	21	1	2	0	136	13
Necaxa (loan)	2024–25	Liga MX	36	8	—		—		3 (Note: Appearances in Leagues Cup)	1	39	9
Necaxa	2025–26	Liga MX	16	2	—		—		3	0	19	2
Necaxa	Total		52	10	—		—		6	1	58	11
Pachuca (loan)	2024–25	Liga MX	—		—		—		3 (Note: Appearances in FIFA Club World Cup)	0	3	0
Cruz Azul	2025–26	Liga MX	22	6	—		5	1	—		27	7
Cruz Azul	2026–27	Liga MX	15	3	—		—		5 (Note: One appearance in Campeón de Campeones, three appearances and one goal in Leagues Cup, one appearance in Campeones Cup)	1	20	4
Cruz Azul	Total		37	9	—		5	1	5	1	47	11
Career total			354	53	18	2	34	5	16	2	422	62

== Honours ==
Platense

- Primera B: 2017–18

Deportivo Cali

- Copa Colombia Runners-up: 2019

River Plate

- Argentine Primera División: 2021, 2023
- Supercopa Argentina: 2019, 2023
- Trofeo de Campeones: 2021, 2023

Cruz Azul

- Liga MX: Clausura 2026
- Campeón de Campeones: 2026
