= 2026 Campeón de Campeones =

Association football match in Carson, California, U.S.

- Match programme cover
- Event: 2026 Campeón de Campeones
Toluca	Cruz Azul
1	3
- Date: 25 July 2026
- Venue: Dignity Health Sports Park, Carson, California, U.S.
- Man of the Match: José Paradela (Cruz Azul)
- Referee: Luis Enrique Santander (Guanajuato)

The 2026 Campeón de Campeones (English: 2026 Champion of Champions) was the 53rd edition of the Campeón de Campeones, an annual association football super cup match. The game was contested between Toluca and Cruz Azul, the two previous season's winners of the two seasonal tournaments that make up the Liga MX calendar, the Apertura 2025 and the Clausura 2026. Cruz Azul won the match 3–1 at at Dignity Health Sports Park in Carson, California, on 25 July 2026. They qualified for the 2026 Campeones Cup, facing the MLS Cup 2025 champions Inter Miami at Nu Stadium in Miami.

== Background ==
The Campeón de Campeones is an annual Liga MX super cup contested between the champions of the two tournaments that make up the Mexican football calendar, the Apertura and the Clausura. This match was the 53rd edition of the super cup. (Note: The edition number was calculated based on figures provided by Goal.com, with the first Campeón de Campeones having been held in 1941–42.) Toluca and Cruz Azul rank among the most successful clubs in Mexican football. In this competition, Toluca had won the Campeón de Campeones title five times, and Cruz Azul on three occasions.

Toluca qualified for the Campeón de Campeones as winners of the Apertura 2025, having defeated Tigres UANL 2–2 on aggregate in the finals following a 1–0 loss in the first-leg and a 2–1 victory in the return leg, before winning 9–8 on penalties. The club entered the match as the reigning Campeón de Campeones, having won the title in the 2025 edition after defeating Club América 3–1. Cruz Azul secured their spot after winning the Clausura 2026, defeating Pumas UNAM 2–1 on aggregate in the finals, with a scoreless draw in the first-leg and a 2–1 win in the second-leg. In May 2026, Toluca won the 2026 CONCACAF Champions Cup, drawing 1–1 with Tigres UANL in regular time before defeating them 6–5 on penalties in the final. Cruz Azul won the previous CONCACAF edition, meaning both Toluca and Cruz Azul qualified for the 2029 FIFA Club World Cup.

The match was held on 25 July 2026 at Dignity Health Sports Park in Carson, California, United States, a week after the conclusion of the 2026 FIFA World Cup and among the first fixtures of the 2026–27 Liga MX season calendar. Due to scheduling conflicts, both Toluca and Cruz Azul played their second fixtures of the season earlier in the week to accommodate the match, which would otherwise have conflicted with the traditional Liga MX weekend schedule.

The game was the eleventh consecutive edition of the Campeón de Campeones to be hosted at the venue. Several Campeón de Campeones editions have been held in the United States with the aim of expanding interest in Liga MX among Mexican and Latino communities there.

== Match ==
Cruz Azul won the match 3–1, securing their fourth Campeón de Campeones title. They qualified for the 2026 Campeones Cup, to be held on 16 September 2026 at the Nu Stadium, against the MLS Cup 2025 champions Inter Miami.

=== Details ===
25 July 2026
18:00 PDT

Toluca	1–3	Cruz Azul
Vega 45+3'	Report	Paradela 31', 61'; Rodríguez 55'

Dignity Health Sports Park, Carson
Referee: Luis Enrique Santander (Guanajuato)

Toluca	Cruz Azul

GK	22	(Mexico) Luis García
DF	19	(Argentina) Santiago Simón
DF	4	(Uruguay) Bruno Méndez	(substituted off) 77'
DF	6	(Uruguay) Federico Pereira
DF	20	(Mexico) Jesús Gallardo
MF	24	(United States) Fernando Arce Jr.	(substituted off) 59'
MF	5	(Argentina) Franco Romero
MF	10	(Mexico) Jesús Angulo	(substituted off) 67'
MF	8	(Argentina) Nicolás Castro	(substituted off) 76'
FW	9	(Mexico) Alexis Vega (c)	(substituted off) 59'
FW	29	(Mexico) Jorge Díaz
Substitutions:
GK	1	(Mexico) Hugo González
DF	2	(Mexico) Diego Barbosa
MF	13	(Brazil) Luan
DF	17	(Mexico) Brian García
DF	25	(Argentina) Everardo López	(substituted on) 77'
MF	7	(Mexico) Víctor Guzmán	(substituted on) 76'
MF	15	(Mexico) Pável Pérez	(substituted on) 59'
MF	35	(Mexico) Érick Gutiérrez
FW	11	(Brazil) Helinho	(substituted on) 59'
FW	21	(Mexico) Iván López	(substituted on) 67'
Manager:
(Argentina) Antonio Mohamed

GK	23	(Colombia) Kevin Mier
DF	16	(Mexico) Jeremy Márquez
DF	4	(Colombia) Willer Ditta
DF	33	(Argentina) Gonzalo Piovi
DF	5	(Mexico) Jesús Orozco	(yellow card) 90+3'
MF	6	(Mexico) Érik Lira (c)
MF	20	(Argentina) José Paradela		(substituted off) 81'
MF	8	(Argentina) Agustín Palavecino	(yellow card) 43'	(substituted off) 90+1'
MF	29	(Argentina) Carlos Rotondi		(substituted off) 80'
MF	19	(Mexico) Carlos Rodríguez		(substituted off) 90'
FW	21	(Uruguay) Gabriel Fernández		(substituted off) 75'
Substitutions:
GK	1	(Mexico) Andrés Gudiño
DF	3	(Mexico) Omar Campos		(substituted on) 80'
MF	12	(Mexico) Alán Montes
DF	22	(Mexico) Jorge Rodarte
MF	10	(Mexico) Andrés Montaño		(substituted on) 90'
MF	17	(Mexico) Amaury García
MF	18	(Argentina) Luka Romero		(substituted on) 81'
FW	7	(Argentina) Nicolás Ibáñez		(substituted on) 90+1'
FW	11	(Nigeria) Christian Ebere		(substituted on) 75'
FW	14	(Colombia) Juan José Calero
Manager:
(Mexico) Joel Huiqui
