= Jorge Rodarte =

Mexican footballer (born 2004)

Personal information
- Full name: Jorge Rodarte Barragán
- Date of birth: 23 April 2004 (age 22)
- Place of birth: Guadalupe, Zacatecas, Mexico
- Height: 1.70 m (5 ft 7 in)
- Position: Centre-back

Team information
- Current team: Cruz Azul
- Number: 22

Youth career
- 2018–2023: Zacatecas

Senior career*
Years	Team	Apps	(Gls)
2021–2025	Zacatecas	55	(0)
2021–2023	→ Fresnillo (loan)	28	(5)
2025	→ Cruz Azul (loan)	4	(0)
2026–	Cruz Azul	18	(0)
- * Club domestic league appearances and goals as of 7 November 2026

Jorge Rodarte Barragán (born 23 April 2004) is a Mexican professional footballer who plays as a centre-back for Liga MX club Cruz Azul.

== Club career ==
=== Mineros de Zacatecas ===
Rodarte started his career in Mineros de Zacatecas youth academy. He played on loan at Universidad Del Futbol from 2019 to 2020. In 2021, he joined Mineros de Fresnillo, and in early 2023, he was called up to the first-team of Mineros de Zacatecas, making his debut on 28 January 2023 against Alacranes de Durango.

=== Cruz Azul ===
On 17 July 2025, Rodarte joined Cruz Azul on a one-year loan. He made his Liga MX debut on 24 September in a 2–2 home draw against Querétaro, starting the match before being substituted for Ángel Sepúlveda in the second-half. On 21 December, Rodarte's contract was made permanent. On 9 January 2026, Rodarte was registered with the first-team for the Clausura 2026 tournament.

== Career statistics ==
As of match played on 7 November 2026

Appearances and goals by club, season and competition
Club	Season	League			National cup		Continental (Note: Includes CONCACAF Champions Cup)		Other		Total	
Club	Season	Division	Apps	Goals	Apps	Goals	Apps	Goals	Apps	Goals	Apps	Goals
Zacatecas	2022–23	Liga de Expansión MX	6	0	—		—		—		6	0
Zacatecas	2023–24	Liga de Expansión MX	25	0	—		—		—		25	0
Zacatecas	2024–25	Liga de Expansión MX	24	0	—		—		—		24	0
Zacatecas	Total		55	0	—		—		—		55	0
Fresnillo (loan)	2021–22	Serie A	15	1	—		—		—		15	1
Fresnillo (loan)	2022–23	Serie A	12	3	—		—		—		12	3
Fresnillo (loan)	2023–24	Serie A	1	1	—		—		—		1	1
Fresnillo (loan)	Total		28	5	—		—		—		28	5
Cruz Azul (loan)	2025–26	Liga MX	4	0	—		—		—		4	0
Cruz Azul	2025–26	Liga MX	14	0	—		5	1	—		19	1
Cruz Azul	2026–27	Liga MX	4	0	—		—		—		4	0
Cruz Azul	Total		18	0	—		5	1	—		23	1
Career total			105	5	0	0	5	1	0	0	110	6

== Honours ==
Cruz Azul

- Liga MX: Clausura 2026
- Campeón de Campeones: 2026
