= Eduardo Navarro Quelquejeu =

Panamanian artist, painter and sculptor

- Born: November 1, 1960; Panama City, Panama
- Known for: Painting
- Movement: neo-expressionism

Eduardo Navarro Quelquejeu (born November 1, 1960), is a Panamanian artist, painter and sculptor.

== Biography ==
Born and raised in Panama City, in 1981 Navarro obtained a B.S. in Mechanical Engineering in Worcester Polytechnic Institute and in 1985 an M.B.A. at The Amos Tuck School at Dartmouth College in Hanover, New Hampshire. Navarro is almost entirely self-taught, receiving no formal education in the visual arts.

His brother, Juan Carlos Navarro is the former Mayor of Panama City, who ran for President in 2014 Panamanian general election.

== Works ==
In 2019 Navarro participated in the Residency Unlimited program in New York City, sponsored by the Rockefeller Brothers Fund.
