= Omar Campos =

Mexican footballer

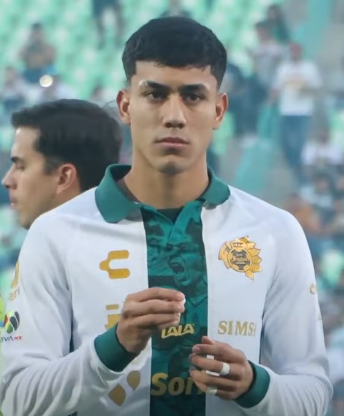
- Campos with Santos Laguna in 2023

Personal information
- Full name: Omar Antonio Campos Chagoya
- Date of birth: 20 July 2002 (age 24)
- Place of birth: Mexico City, Mexico
- Height: 5 ft 9 in (1.76 m)
- Position: Left-back

Team information
- Current team: Cruz Azul
- Number: 3

Youth career
- 2016–2021: Santos Laguna

Senior career*
Years	Team	Apps	(Gls)
2021–2024	Santos Laguna	109	(3)
2024–2025	Los Angeles FC	27	(2)
2025–	Cruz Azul	60	(3)

International career^{‡}
2021	Mexico U20	2	(0)
2023–	Mexico	1	(0)
- * Club domestic league appearances and goals as of 7 November 2026 ‡ National team caps and goals as of 16 December 2023

Omar Antonio Campos Chagoya (born 20 July 2002) is a Mexican professional footballer who plays as a left-back for Liga MX club Cruz Azul.

== Club career ==
=== Santos Laguna ===
Born in Cuauhtémoc district of Mexico City, Campos grew up in the Tepito neighborhood before joining the youth setup at Santos Laguna in 2016. On 17 January 2021, he made his professional debut for Santos Laguna under manager Guillermo Almada in a Liga MX game against Tigres UANL. He came on as an 85th-minute substitute for Juan Ferney Otero as Santos won 2–0.

Campos scored his first professional goal on 6 February 2021 against Atlas, scoring the opening goal for Santos Laguna in their 1–1 draw.

=== Los Angeles ===
On 30 January 2024, Campos joined Major League Soccer club Los Angeles FC on a four-year deal. Campos started in 17 of 27 matches with LAFC.

Campos scored the winning goal in a 3–1 victory against Sporting KC in the US Open Cup on 25 September 2024.

=== Cruz Azul ===
On 5 January 2025, Campos joined Liga MX side Cruz Azul on a permanent transfer.

== International career ==
On 6 December 2021, Campos received his first call-up to the senior national team. He made his senior debut on 16 December 2023, in a friendly match against Colombia.

== Career statistics ==
=== Club ===
As of match played on 7 November 2026

Appearances and goals by club, season and competition
Club	Season	League			National cup		Continental (Note: Includes CONCACAF Champions League/Cup)		Other		Total	
Club	Season	Division	Apps	Goals	Apps	Goals	Apps	Goals	Apps	Goals	Apps	Goals
Santos Laguna	2020–21	Liga MX	20	1	—		—		1 (Note: Appearances in Leagues Cup)	0	21	1
Santos Laguna	2021–22	Liga MX	29	1	—		2	0	—		31	1
Santos Laguna	2022–23	Liga MX	39	1	—		—		—		39	1
Santos Laguna	2023–24	Liga MX	21	0	—		—		2	0	23	0
Santos Laguna	Total		109	3	—		2	0	3	0	114	3
Los Angeles FC	2024	MLS	27	0	5	1	—		6	0	38	1
Cruz Azul	2024–25	Liga MX	6	0	—		3	0	—		9	0
Cruz Azul	2025–26	Liga MX	38	2	—		6	0	4 (Note: Three appearances in Leagues Cup, one appearance in FIFA Intercontinental Cup)	0	48	2
Cruz Azul	2026–27	Liga MX	16	1	—		—		5 (Note: One appearance in Campeón de Campeones, three appearances in Leagues Cup, one appearance in Campeones Cup)	0	21	1
Cruz Azul	Total		60	3	—		9	0	9	0	78	3
Career total			196	6	5	1	11	0	18	0	230	7

=== International ===
As of match played on 16 December 2023

Appearances and goals by national team and year
National team	Year	Apps	Goals
Mexico	2023	1	0
Total		1	0

== Honours ==
Los Angeles FC

- U.S. Open Cup: 2024

Cruz Azul

- Liga MX: Clausura 2026
- Campeón de Campeones: 2026
- CONCACAF Champions Cup: 2025

Individual

- Liga MX All-Star: 2026
