= Érik Lira =

Mexican footballer (born 2000)

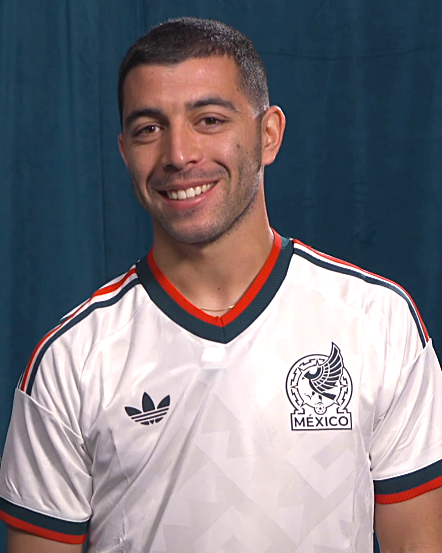
- Lira with Mexico in 2026

Personal information
- Full name: Érik Antonio Lira Méndez
- Date of birth: 8 May 2000 (age 26)
- Place of birth: Cuauhtémoc, Mexico City, Mexico
- Height: 1.72 m (5 ft 8 in)
- Position: Defensive midfielder

Team information
- Current team: Cruz Azul
- Number: 6

Youth career
- 2013–2018: Pumas UNAM
- 2018–2020: Necaxa

Senior career*
Years	Team	Apps	(Gls)
2019	Necaxa	0	(0)
2020–2021	Pumas UNAM	57	(0)
2022–	Cruz Azul	180	(2)

International career^{‡}
2021–2023	Mexico U23	9	(0)
2021–	Mexico	34	(0)
Medal record
Men's football
Representing Mexico
CONCACAF Gold Cup
Winner	2025 United States–Canada	Team
CONCACAF Nations League
Winner	2025 United States
Pan American Games
Bronze medal – third place	2023 Santiago	Team
- * Club domestic league appearances and goals as of 7 November 2026 ‡ National team caps and goals as of 18 November 2026

Érik Antonio Lira Méndez (born 8 May 2000) is a Mexican professional footballer who plays as a defensive midfielder for Liga MX club Cruz Azul, which he captains, and the Mexico national team.

== Club career ==
=== Pumas UNAM ===
Lira began his career in 2013 when he joined the youth academy of Pumas UNAM. Five years later, he moved to Necaxa, making his professional debut on 1 August 2018, in a Copa MX match against Tampico Madero. He eventually returned to Pumas, where he marked his Liga MX debut on 3 August 2020, contributing to a victory over Atlas.

=== Cruz Azul ===
On 4 January 2022, Lira signed with Cruz Azul on a contract extending through December 2025. He made his debut for the club on 9 January against Tijuana. On 26 June 2022, he won his first professional title when Cruz Azul defeated Atlas on penalties to win the Supercopa de la Liga MX. Lira made his debut as club captain on 31 August 2024 in a 4–1 home victory over América in the Clásico Joven.

On 1 June 2025, Cruz Azul won the CONCACAF Champions Cup after defeating Vancouver Whitecaps FC in the final, marking Lira's second title with the club. Following the departure of Ignacio Rivero on 6 January 2026, Lira was officially appointed as the permanent club captain. Four months later, he lifted his first trophy as captain on 24 May, when Cruz Azul defeated Pumas UNAM 2–1 on aggregate to win the Clausura 2026 championship. At the start of the 2026–27 season, Lira secured his second trophy as captain, and his fourth overall with the club, by winning the Campeón de Campeones.

In late August 2026, Cruz Azul and Monaco reached an agreement for Lira's transfer. The deal collapsed on 1 September after the French side failed to free up a non-EU spot to register the Mexican midfielder.

== International career ==
In May 2021, Lira was called up by Jaime Lozano to participate with the Mexico under-23 team for June friendlies against Romania, Saudi Arabia, and Australia. On 27 October, Lira made his senior national team debut under Gerardo Martino in a friendly match against Ecuador.

On 10 October 2023, Lira was included Ricardo Cadena's Mexico under-23 roster for the Pan American Games. Mexico attained the bronze medal after defeating the United States 4–1 in the third-place match.

Lira was named in the 26-man squad for the 2026 FIFA World Cup, hosted on home soil.

== Career statistics ==
=== Club ===
As of match played on 7 November 2026

Appearances and goals by club, season and competition
Club	Season	League			National cup		Continental		Other		Total	
Club	Season	Division	Apps	Goals	Apps	Goals	Apps	Goals	Apps	Goals	Apps	Goals
Necaxa	2018–19	Liga MX	—		3	0	—		—		3	0
Pumas UNAM	2020–21	Liga MX	36	0	—		—		2 (Note: Appearances in Leagues Cup)	0	38	0
Pumas UNAM	2021–22	Liga MX	21	0	—		—		—		21	0
Pumas UNAM	Total		57	0	—		—		2	0	59	0
Cruz Azul	2021–22	Liga MX	20	0	—		5 (Note: Appearances in CONCACAF Champions Cup)	0	—		25	0
Cruz Azul	2022–23	Liga MX	36	0	—		—		1 (Note: Appearance in Supercopa de la Liga MX)	0	37	0
Cruz Azul	2023–24	Liga MX	35	0	—		—		1	0	36	0
Cruz Azul	2024–25	Liga MX	39	1	—		7	0	4	0	50	1
Cruz Azul	2025–26	Liga MX	37	0	—		6	1	4 (Note: Three appearances in Leagues Cup, one appearance in FIFA Intercontinental Cup)	0	47	1
Cruz Azul	2026–27	Liga MX	13	1	—		—		5 (Note: One appearance in Campeón de Campeones, three appearances in Leagues Cup, one appearance in Campeones Cup)	0	18	1
Cruz Azul	Total		180	2	—		18	1	15	0	213	3
Career total			237	2	3	0	18	1	17	0	275	3

=== International ===
As of match played on 17 November 2026

Appearances and goals by national team and year
National team	Year	Apps	Goals
Mexico	2021	2	0
Mexico	2022	1	0
Mexico	2023	1	0
Mexico	2024	1	0
Mexico	2025	12	0
Mexico	2026	17	0
Total		34	0

== Honours ==
Cruz Azul

- Liga MX: Clausura 2026
- Campeón de Campeones: 2026
- Supercopa de la Liga MX: 2022
- CONCACAF Champions Cup: 2025

Mexico U23

- Pan American Bronze Medal: 2023

Mexico

- CONCACAF Gold Cup: 2025
- CONCACAF Nations League: 2024–25

Individual

- Liga MX Best XI: Apertura 2021
- Liga MX All-Star: 2021, 2022, 2025, 2026
- Liga MX Best Center-back: 2025–26
