= Román Torres (footballer, born 2004) =

Mexican footballer (born 2004)

Personal information
- Full name: Román Torres Acosta
- Date of birth: 22 December 2004 (age 21)
- Place of birth: Chihuahua, Chihuahua, Mexico
- Height: 1.79 m (5 ft 10 in)
- Positions: Right-back; centre-back

Team information
- Current team: Atlético San Luis
- Number: 2

Youth career
- 2019–2024: Necaxa
- 2025: Atlético San Luis

Senior career*
| Years | Team | Apps | (Gls) |
| 2024 | Necaxa | 1 | (0) |
| 2025– | Atlético San Luis | 62 | (2) |

International career^{‡}
| 2021 | Mexico U19 | 1 | (0) |
| 2021–2022 | Mexico U20 | 3 | (0) |
- * Club domestic league appearances and goals as of 20 November 2026 ‡ National team caps and goals as of 26 October 2025

Román Torres Acosta (born 22 December 2004) is a Mexican professional footballer who plays as a right-back and a centre-back for Liga MX club Atlético San Luis.

== Club career ==
=== Necaxa ===
Torres began his career at the academy of Necaxa, progressing through all categories, until making his professional debut on 14 July 2024 in a 4–1 win against Puebla, being subbed in at the 84th minute.

=== Atlético San Luis ===
On 3 January 2025, Torres was acquired by Atlético San Luis, making his team debut on 7 February 2025, in a 0–1 loss to Querétaro where he played the full match. On 26 February he got his first assist in a 3–1 win against Guadalajara and on 20 April, he scored his first professional goal in a 2–1 win against Pachuca.

== Career statistics ==
=== Club ===
As of match played on 20 November 2026

Appearances and goals by club, season and competition
| Club | Season | League | | | Cup | | Continental | | Club World Cup | | Other | | Total | |
| Club | Season | Division | Apps | Goals | Apps | Goals | Apps | Goals | Apps | Goals | Apps | Goals | Apps | Goals |
|---|---|---|---|---|---|---|---|---|---|---|---|---|---|---|
| Necaxa | 2024–25 | Liga MX | 1 | 0 | — | | — | | — | | — | | 1 | 0 |
| Atlético San Luis | 2024–25 | Liga MX | 12 | 1 | — | | — | | — | | — | | 12 | 1 |
| Atlético San Luis | 2025–26 | Liga MX | 33 | 1 | — | | — | | — | | 3 (Note: Appearances in Leagues Cup) | 0 | 36 | 1 |
| Atlético San Luis | 2026–27 | Liga MX | 17 | 0 | — | | — | | — | | 2 | 0 | 19 | 0 |
| Atlético San Luis | Total | | 62 | 2 | — | | — | | — | | 5 | 0 | 67 | 2 |
| Career total | | | 63 | 2 | 0 | 0 | 0 | 0 | 0 | 0 | 5 | 0 | 68 | 2 |
