= Nicolás Larcamón =

Argentine football manager (born 1984)

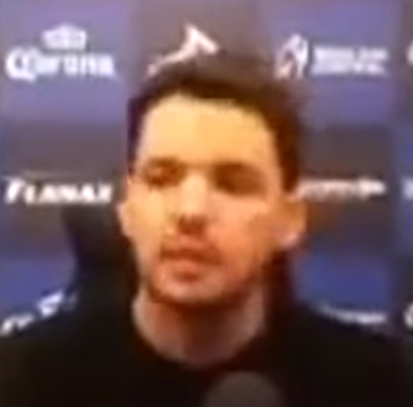
- Larcamón in 2022

Personal information
- Full name: Nicolás Ricardo Larcamón
- Date of birth: 11 August 1984 (age 42)
- Place of birth: La Plata, Argentina
- Height: 1.78 m (5 ft 10 in)

Team information
- Current team: Sporting Gijón (head coach)

Youth career
- Years: Team
- 2001–2006: Los Andes

Managerial career
- 2009–2010: Nueva Chicago (youth)
- 2011–2013: Los Andes (youth)
- 2016–2017: Deportivo Anzoátegui
- 2017: Deportes Antofagasta
- 2018–2019: Huachipato
- 2020: Curicó Unido
- 2021–2022: Puebla
- 2023: León
- 2024: Cruzeiro
- 2025: Necaxa
- 2025–2026: Cruz Azul
- 2026–: Sporting Gijón

Nicolás Ricardo Larcamón (born 11 August 1984) is an Argentine professional football manager.

== Early life ==
Larcamón was born in La Plata, Argentina to a footballing family: both his father and an uncle played professionally in Argentina. He dreamed of following in their footsteps and rose through the ranks at Los Andes, where he signed a contract and was set to be part of the senior squad. However, after suffering from osteochondritis, Larcamón retired as a player at the age of 22.

After ending his playing career, Larcamón began studying to be a physical education teacher, then took a sharp turn and changed his focus of study to architecture. He spent four years working towards this field before his passion for football won out.

== Career ==
=== Early career ===
Shortly before finishing his architectural studies, Larcamón took an opportunity to coach at the youth club Almafuerte de Temperley. From there, he rose through the coaching ranks: from working with the youth teams at Nueva Chicago and Los Andes, to the reserve team level, and as an assistant coach for the senior squad with Nueva Chicago, working under manager Alejandro Nanía.

=== Deportivo Anzoátegui ===
On 27 December 2015, days after being announced as a youth manager of Zulia, Larcamón was appointed manager of Venezuelan Primera División side Deportivo Anzoátegui. In his first senior season, he qualified the club to the 2017 Copa Sudamericana, and renewed his contract until 2018 on 30 October 2016.

On 10 June 2017, Larcamón announced his departure from DANZ after the end of the Apertura tournament.

=== Deportes Antofagasta ===
Hours after leaving Anzoátegui, Larcamón agreed to become the manager of Deportes Antofagasta of the Chilean Primera División. On 25 December, after narrowly missing out a continental qualification, he resigned.

=== Huachipato ===
On 4 January 2018, Larcamón replaced compatriot César Vigevani at the helm of Huachipato, also in the Chilean top tier. After finishing ninth in his first season, he left on a mutual consent on 9 July 2019.

=== Curicó Unido ===
On 5 December 2019, Curicó Unido officially announced Larcamón as their manager for the upcoming season. He resigned from the club on 19 November 2020, after reportedly having "received offers from foreign clubs".

=== Puebla ===
On 9 December 2020, Larcamón replaced sacked Juan Reynoso at the helm of Liga MX side Puebla. He resigned on 9 November 2022, before the start of the 2022–23 season.

=== León ===
On 30 November 2022, Larcamón took over fellow Mexican top tier side León. Despite winning the 2023 CONCACAF Champions League, he was sacked on 15 December 2023, after their elimination in the 2023 FIFA Club World Cup.

=== Cruzeiro ===
On 20 December 2023, Larcamón was appointed head coach of Campeonato Brasileiro Série A side Cruzeiro. On 8 April 2024, Lacarmón was dismissed after losing the Campeonato Mineiro final to rivals Atlético Mineiro.

=== Necaxa ===
On 26 November 2024, Larcamón returned to Mexico to sign with Necaxa. On 12 June 2025, Larcamon concluded his employment with Necaxa following the payment of his termination clause.

=== Cruz Azul ===
On 16 June 2025, Larcamón became the head coach of Cruz Azul. On 22 April 2026, he was dismissed from his position following a nine-match winless streak.

=== Sporting Gijón ===
In May 2026, Larcamón agreed to become the manager of Spanish Segunda División side Sporting de Gijón ahead of the 2026–27 season.

== Managerial statistics ==
As of match played 22 November 2026

Managerial record by team and tenure
Team	Nat	From	To	Record							
Team	Nat	From	To	G	W	D	L	GF	GA	GD	Win %
Deportivo Anzoátegui	(Venezuela)	1 January 2016	30 June 2017	69	33	17	19	99	75	+24	47.83
Deportes Antofagasta	(Chile)	1 July 2017	31 December 2017	23	9	9	5	26	19	+7	39.13
Huachipato	(Chile)	4 January 2018	9 July 2019	52	18	15	19	66	60	+6	34.62
Curicó Unido	(Chile)	1 January 2020	19 November 2020	19	9	4	6	21	27	−6	47.37
Puebla	(Mexico)	10 December 2020	9 November 2022	81	27	32	22	105	99	+6	33.33
León	(Mexico)	30 November 2022	15 December 2023	51	22	13	16	76	62	+14	43.14
Cruzeiro	(Brazil)	20 December 2023	8 April 2024	14	7	4	3	21	13	+8	50.00
Necaxa	(Mexico)	26 November 2024	12 June 2025	19	10	3	6	38	31	+7	52.63
Cruz Azul	(Mexico)	16 June 2025	22 April 2026	47	22	18	7	81	60	+21	46.81
Sporting de Gijón	(Spain)	25 May 2026	Present	16	8	2	6	19	20	−1	50.00
Total				391	165	117	109	552	466	+86	42.20

== Honours ==
=== Manager ===
León

- CONCACAF Champions League: 2023
