= Eduardo Navarro (footballer, born 2004) =

Mexican footballer (born 2004)

Personal information
- Full name: Eduardo Ramsés Navarro Agramont
- Date of birth: 12 July 2004 (age 22)
- Place of birth: Monterrey, Nuevo León, Mexico
- Height: 1.79 m (5 ft 10 in)
- Position: Full-back

Team information
- Current team: Puebla
- Number: 13

Youth career
- 2022–: Puebla

Senior career*
Years	Team	Apps	(Gls)
2025–	Puebla	24	(0)
- * Club domestic league appearances and goals as of 7 October 2026

Eduardo Ramsés Navarro Agramont (born 12 July 2004) is a Mexican professional footballer who plays as a full-back for Liga MX club Puebla.

== Club career ==
Navarro began his career at the academy of Puebla before making his professional debut on 13 September 2025 against Toluca, playing 75 minutes and getting a yellow card in a 1–3 loss.

== Career statistics ==
=== Club ===
As of 7 October 2026

Club	Season	League			Cup		Continental		Other		Total	
Club	Season	Division	Apps	Goals	Apps	Goals	Apps	Goals	Apps	Goals	Apps	Goals
Puebla	2025–26	Liga MX	24	0	—		—		—		24	0
Career total			24	0	0	0	0	0	0	0	24	0
