= José Paradela =

Argentine footballer

Personal information
- Full name: José Antonio Paradela
- Date of birth: 15 December 1998 (age 27)
- Place of birth: Quiroga, Argentina
- Height: 1.78 m (5 ft 10 in)
- Position: Midfielder

Team information
- Current team: Cruz Azul
- Number: 20

Youth career
- Club Atlético Quiroga

Senior career*
Years	Team	Apps	(Gls)
2016–2018	Rivadavia Lincoln	34	(0)
2018–2021	Gimnasia La Plata	26	(0)
2021–2024	River Plate	65	(6)
2023	→ Tigre (loan)	14	(1)
2024	→ Necaxa (loan)	17	(5)
2025	Necaxa	36	(11)
2025–	Cruz Azul	56	(13)
- * Club domestic league appearances and goals as of 7 November 2026

José Antonio Paradela (born 15 December 1998) is an Argentine professional footballer who plays as a midfielder for Liga MX club Cruz Azul.

== Club career ==
=== Rivadavia ===
Rivadavia was Paradela's first senior club after he started out at Club Atlético Quiroga, with the midfielder making his first two career appearances in the 2016 Torneo Federal B campaign; which Rivadavia ended with promotion to Torneo Federal A.

=== Gimnasia y Esgrima ===
After being picked thirty-six times in the subsequent 2016–17 and 2017–18 seasons, Paradela departed the club on 8 August 2018 after agreeing to join Argentine Primera División side Gimnasia y Esgrima. He made his first appearance on 2 December versus River Plate, appearing for the final twenty-three minutes as he made his Primera División bow under Pedro Troglio.

=== River Plate ===
After twenty-seven appearances for Gimnasia y Esgrima, Paradela completed a transfer to River Plate on 18 February 2021.

==== 2023: Loan to Tigre ====
On 17 August 2023, he joined Tigre on a one-year loan, with the option to join permanently.

==== 2024: Loan to Necaxa ====
On 17 January 2024, he joined Liga MX side Necaxa, on a one-year loan with an option to join permanently.

=== Necaxa ===
After a productive loan spell, in which he recorded 8 goals and 9 assists in 34 games, Paradela joined the club permanently, for a $2 million fee.

=== Cruz Azul ===
On 11 July 2025, Paradela was transferred to Cruz Azul.

== Career statistics ==
As of match played on 7 November 2026

Appearances and goals by club, season and competition
Club	Season	League			National cup		League cup		Continental (Note: Includes appearances in Copa Libertadores, CONCACAF Champions Cup)		Other (Note: Includes appearances in Torneo Federal A play-offs, Trofeo de Campeones, Leagues Cup)		Total	
Club	Season	Division	Apps	Goals	Apps	Goals	Apps	Goals	Apps	Goals	Apps	Goals	Apps	Goals
Rivadavia	2016	Torneo Federal B	2	0	—		—		—		—		2	0
Rivadavia	2016–17	Torneo Federal A	13	0	—		—		—		2	0	15	0
Rivadavia	2017–18	Torneo Federal A	19	0	2	0	—		—		—		21	0
Rivadavia	Total		34	0	2	0	—		—		2	0	38	0
Gimnasia y Esgrima	2018–19	Primera División	1	0	—		—		—		—		1	0
Gimnasia y Esgrima	2019–20	Primera División	16	0	—		1	0	—		—		17	0
Gimnasia y Esgrima	2020–21 (Note: Soccerway counts 2020 Copa de la Liga Profesional appearances as league appearances.)	Primera División	9	0	—		—		—		—		9	0
Gimnasia y Esgrima	Total		26	0	—		1	0	—		—		27	0
River Plate	2021	Primera División	23	2	1	0	—		6	0	1	0	31	2
River Plate	2022	Primera División	22	2	2	1	—		4	0	—		28	3
River Plate	2023	Primera División	20	2	1	0	—		5	0	—		26	2
River Plate	Total		65	6	4	1	—		15	0	1	0	85	7
Tigre (loan)	2023	Primera División	14	1	—		—		—		—		14	1
Necaxa (loan)	2023–24	Liga MX	17	5	—		—		—		—		17	5
Necaxa	2024–25	Liga MX	36	11	—		—		—		3	0	39	11
Necaxa	Total		53	16	—		—		—		3	0	56	16
Cruz Azul	2025–26	Liga MX	44	10	—		—		6	2	4 (Note: Three appearances in Leagues Cup, one appearance in FIFA Intercontinental Cup)	0	54	12
Cruz Azul	2026–27	Liga MX	12	3	—		—		—		5 (Note: One appearance and two goals in Campeón de Campeones, three appearances and two goals in Leagues Cup, one appearance in Campeones Cup)	4	17	7
Cruz Azul	Total		56	13	—		—		6	2	9	4	71	19
Career total			248	36	6	1	1	0	21	2	15	4	291	43

== Honours ==
Club Rivadavia

- Torneo Federal B: 2016

River Plate

- Supercopa Argentina: 2019
- Argentine Primera División: 2021, 2023
- Trofeo de Campeones: 2021

Cruz Azul

- Liga MX: Clausura 2026
- Campeón de Campeones: 2026

Individual

- Liga MX All-Star: 2026
