= 2023–24 Liga MX season =

77th professional season of the top-flight football league in Mexico

Liga MX
- Season: 2023–24
- Champions: Apertura: América (14th title); Clausura: América (15th title)
- Champions Cup: América; UANL; Monterrey; Guadalajara; UNAM; Cruz Azul
- Matches: 306; Apertura: 153; Clausura: 153
- Goals: 894 (2.92 per match); Apertura: 437 (2.86 per match); Clausura: 457 (2.99 per match)
- Top goalscorer: Apertura: Harold Preciado (11 goals); Clausura: Uriel Antuna; Diber Cambindo; Salomón Rondón; Federico Viñas (8 goals)
- Biggest home win: Apertura: UANL 5–0 Querétaro (2 September 2023); Toluca 5–0 Pachuca (3 September 2023); Clausura: Atlético San Luis 4–0 Puebla (1 March 2024); UANL 5–1 Mazatlán (16 March 2024); América 5–1 Toluca (13 April 2024)
- Biggest away win: Apertura: Guadalajara 0–4 UANL (28 October 2023); Clausura: Atlas 1–5 América (2 March 2024); Mazatlán 0–4 UNAM (5 April 2024); Atlético San Luis 1–5 Toluca (19 April 2024)
- Highest scoring: Apertura: Puebla 5–4 León (3 November 2023); Clausura: Pachuca 4–3 Atlas (31 January 2024); Juárez 4–3 Puebla (23 March 2024); UANL 5–2 Necaxa (20 April 2024); Necaxa 2–5 Monterrey (28 April 2024)
- Longest winning run: Apertura: 7 matches América; Clausura: 5 matches Cruz Azul; Guadalajara
- Longest unbeaten run: Apertura: 16 matches América; Clausura: 12 matches Monterrey
- Longest winless run: Apertura: 8 matches Atlas; Necaxa; Clausura: 14 matches Tijuana
- Longest losing run: Apertura: 6 matches Juárez; Clausura: 6 matches Puebla
- Highest attendance: Apertura: 62,707; América vs UNAM (30 September 2023); Clausura: 67,623; Cruz Azul vs Guadalajara (2 March 2024)
- Lowest attendance: Apertura: 4,673; Pachuca vs Santos Laguna (18 September 2023); Clausura: 8,784; Querétaro vs Atlético San Luis (27 February 2024)
- Total attendance: Apertura: 3,159,632; Clausura: 3,571,400
- Average attendance: Apertura: 20,651; Clausura: 23,342
- Stats are from the regular season only Source: Liga MX

The 2023–24 Liga MX season (known as the Liga BBVA MX for sponsorship reasons) was the 77th professional season of the top-flight football league in Mexico. The season was divided into two championships—the Apertura 2023 and the Clausura 2024—each in an identical format and each contested by the same eighteen teams.

== Clubs ==
A total of eighteen teams are participating in the 2023–24 edition of the Liga MX. All eighteen teams have participated in Liga MX since the 2020–21 season.

=== Moves ===
The owner's assembly decided to adjust liguilla qualification, which was modified as of the Guardianes 2020 season. The number of teams directly qualifying to the quarter-finals was increased from four to six, while reducing the number of teams entering the reclassification round from eight to four, aligning it with the NBA's "play-in" round. The 9th place team hosts the 10th place team in an elimination game. The 7th hosts the 8th place team in the double-chance game, with the winner advancing as the 7-seed. The loser of this game then hosts the winner of the elimination game between the 9th and 10th place teams to determine the 8-seed.

=== Stadiums and locations ===
Team	Location	Stadium	Capacity
América	Mexico City	Azteca	87,523
Atlas	Guadalajara, Jalisco	Jalisco	55,020
Atlético San Luis	San Luis Potosí, San Luis Potosí	Alfonso Lastras	27,029
Cruz Azul	Mexico City	Estadio Ciudad de los Deportes	33,000
Guadalajara	Zapopan, Jalisco	Akron	46,232
Juárez	Ciudad Juárez, Chihuahua	Olímpico Benito Juárez	19,703
León	León, Guanajuato	León	31,297
Mazatlán	Mazatlán, Sinaloa	El Encanto	20,195
Monterrey	Guadalupe, Nuevo León	BBVA	53,500
Necaxa	Aguascalientes, Aguascalientes	Victoria	23,851
Pachuca	Pachuca, Hidalgo	Hidalgo	25,922
Puebla	Puebla, Puebla	Cuauhtémoc	51,726
Querétaro	Querétaro, Querétaro	Corregidora	34,107
Santos Laguna	Torreón, Coahuila	Corona	29,101
Tijuana	Tijuana, Baja California	Caliente	31,158
Toluca	Toluca, State of Mexico	Nemesio Díez	27,273
UANL	San Nicolás de los Garza, Nuevo León	Universitario	41,886
UNAM	Mexico City	Olímpico Universitario	58,445

1. The Estadio Azteca will be closed from 2024 to 2025 due to renovations for the 2026 FIFA World Cup.

=== Stadium changes ===
Cruz Azul (Clausura 2024)
Estadio Ciudad de los Deportes
Capacity: 33,000

Locations of the 2022–23 Liga MX teams
Greater Mexico City Liga MX football clubs

=== Personnel and kits ===
Team	Chairman	Head coach	Captain	Kit manufacturer	Shirt sponsor(s)	
Team	Chairman	Head coach	Captain	Kit manufacturer	Front	Other
América	Santiago Baños	(Brazil) André Jardine	(Mexico) Henry Martín	Nike	Caliente	Back: Corona; AT&T; Sleeves: GNP; Free Fire; Shorts: Caliente; Socks: Restonic
Atlas	José Riestra	(Spain) Beñat San José	(Mexico) Aldo Rocha	Charly	Caliente, Urrea, Perdura	Back: Seguros Atlas; Dalton; Akron; Sleeves: Red Cola; Electrolit; Berel; Omnibus de México; Shorts: Hospital Country; Izzi; Red Cola; Chimex; Socks: Perdura
Atlético San Luis	Jacobo Payán Espinosa	(Brazil) Gustavo Leal	(Mexico) Javier Güémez	Sporelli	Canel's, Daikin, Dalton, BHFitness, Laboratorio Tequis, Cementos Moctezuma	Back: Caliente; Potosí; Sleeves: Grupo Acerero; Primera Plus; Red Cola; Mobil; Shorts: Libertad Soluciones de Vida; H-E-B; Caliente; BRR Binasa; Socks: Cementos Moctezuma
Cruz Azul	Víctor Velázquez	(Argentina) Martín Anselmi	(Uruguay) Ignacio Rivero	Pirma	Cemento Cruz Azul	Back: Caliente
Guadalajara	Amaury Vergara	(Argentina) Fernando Gago	(Mexico) Víctor Guzmán	Puma	Caliente	Back: Omnilife; Akron; Sleeves: GNP; Sello Rojo; Shorts: Caliente; Socks: Perdura
Juárez	Andrés Fassi	(Brazil) Maurício Barbieri	(Mexico) Javier Salas	Sporelli	Betcris	Back: Del Rio; Sleeves: Flō Networks; Shorts: Ruba; Socks: Hagalo
León	Jesús Martínez Murguia	(Uruguay) Jorge Bava	(Colombia) William Tesillo	Charly	Cementos Fortaleza, Office Depot, Roshfrans, Telcel	Back: Caliente; Ciudad Maderas; Sleeves: OXXO; TUDN; Shorts: Leche León; La Alemana; HOTSSON Hotel; Roxel; Socks: Perdura
Mazatlán	Mauricio Lanz González	(Mexico) Gilberto Adame (Interim)	(Ecuador) Jefferson Intriago	Pirma	Caliente, Paquetexpress, Banda el Recodo	Back: Corona; Banco Azteca; El Encanto Desarrollos; Sleeves: Primera Plus; Aeternus Funerales; eXp México; Shorts: Caliente; Socks: eXp México
Monterrey	José Antonio Noriega	(Argentina) Fernando Ortiz	(Mexico) Héctor Moreno	Puma	BBVA, Codere, Roshfrans, VIDUSA	Back: Tecate; OXXO; H-E-B; Sleeves: nowports; CREST México; Berel; Shorts: Futura; Socks: Viva
Necaxa	Ernesto Tinajero Flores	(Mexico) Eduardo Fentanes	(Mexico) Alexis Peña	Pirma	Rolcar, Playdoit, J.M. Romo	Back: Playdoit; Sisolar; epa!; Grupo San Cristóbal; Sleeves: Mobil; Megacable; SERFITEX; Bionda; Shorts: ETN; Playdoit; L'ANQGEL; Centro Médico La Salud; Socks: Perdura
Pachuca	Armando Martínez Patiño	(Uruguay) Guillermo Almada	(Argentina) Gustavo Cabral	Charly	Cementos Fortaleza, JAC, Roshfrans, Telcel	Back: Office Depot; Betcris; Sleeves: TUDN; Shorts: ADO; Broxel; Héroes por la Vida; Socks: Pegazulejo Fortec
Puebla	Manuel Jiménez García	(Argentina) Andrés Carevic	(Mexico) Diego de Buen	Pirma	Caliente	Back: Banco Azteca; Estrella Roja; Sleeves: Flanax; TamariZ; Mobil; Shorts: Caliente; Laboratorio Ruiz; Citroscut; Universidad de Oriente; Beriscan Pro; Carl's Jr.; Socks: Perdura
Querétaro	Juan Olvera	(Argentina) Mauro Gerk	(Mexico) Kevin Escamilla	Charly	Pedigree Petfoods, Caliente, Sayer, NOX Móvil, Petro Figues	Back: Ciudad Maderas; Afirme; Chocko-obleas; H-E-B; Sleeves: Snickers (Home); M&M's (Away); Garmo Click; Shorts: Caliente; Harinera Monarca; Idaly Medical; Socks: Perdura
Santos Laguna	Dante Elizalde	(Mexico) Ignacio Ambriz	(Mexico) Carlos Acevedo	Charly	Soriana, Peñoles, Lala, Grupo SIMSA	Back: Corona; Caliente; Lala; Sleeves: Penafiel; Omnibus de México; Shorts: Sanatorio Español; Totalplay; Aeroméxico; City Club; Socks: Grupo SIMSA
Tijuana	Jorge Hank Inzunsa	(Mexico) Miguel Herrera	(Colombia) Christian Rivera	Charly	Caliente	Back: Calimax; Caliente; Afirme; Telcel; Sleeves: Caliente; Autobuses de Baja California; Carl's Jr.; Shorts: Caliente; SuKarne; Billú; PETSA Express
Toluca	Arturo Pérez Arredondo	(Portugal) Renato Paiva	(Chile) Valber Huerta	New Balance	Roshfrans	Back: Corona; Sleeves: Roshfrans; Caliente; Shorts: Caliente
UANL	Mauricio Culebro	(Uruguay) Robert Siboldi	(Argentina) Guido Pizarro	Adidas	Cemex, Bitso	Back: Tecate; Afirme; H-E-B; Sleeves: Telcel; Berel; Shorts: Cemex Vertua; OXXO Gas
UNAM	Luis Raúl González	(Argentina) Gustavo Lema	(Mexico) Adrián Aldrete	Nike	DHL Express, Mifel	Back: Telcel; Suzuki; Caliente; Sleeves: GNP; Berel; Mobil; Socks: Bridgestone

=== Managerial changes ===
Team	Outgoing manager	Manner of departure	Date of vacancy	Replaced by	Date of appointment	Position in table	Ref.
Pre-Apertura changes
Mazatlán	(Argentina) Rubén Omar Romano	Sacked	30 April 2023	(Spain) Ismael Rescalvo	18 May 2023	Pre-season	
Necaxa	(Argentina) Andrés Lillini	Mutual agreement	2 May 2023	(Venezuela) Rafael Dudamel	16 May 2023	Pre-season	
Juárez	(Mexico) Diego Mejía (Interim)	Ratified as manager	13 May 2023	(Mexico) Diego Mejía	13 May 2023	Pre-season	
América	(Argentina) Fernando Ortiz	Mutual agreement	22 May 2023	(Brazil) André Jardine	16 June 2023	Pre-season	
Monterrey	(Mexico) Víctor Manuel Vucetich	Sacked	27 May 2023	(Argentina) Fernando Ortiz	29 May 2023	Pre-season	
Atlético de San Luis	(Brazil) André Jardine	Signed by América	16 June 2023	(Brazil) Gustavo Leal	20 June 2023	Pre-season	
Apertura changes
Cruz Azul	(Brazil) Ricardo Ferretti	Sacked	7 August 2023	(Mexico) Joaquín Moreno	7 August 2023	18th	
Puebla	(Mexico) Eduardo Arce	Sacked	23 August 2023	(Mexico) Ricardo Carbajal (Interim)	23 August 2023	17th	
Necaxa	(Venezuela) Rafael Dudamel	Mutual agreement	28 August 2023	(Mexico) Luis Alberto Padilla (Interim)	28 August 2023	18th	
Necaxa	(Mexico) Luis Alberto Padilla (Interim)	End of tenure as caretaker	5 September 2023	(Mexico) Eduardo Fentanes	5 September 2023	18th	
Puebla	(Mexico) Ricardo Carbajal (Interim)	Ratified as manager	7 September 2023	(Mexico) Ricardo Carbajal	7 September 2023	12th	
Toluca	(Mexico) Ignacio Ambríz	Mutual agreement	25 October 2023	(Uruguay) Carlos María Morales (Interim)	26 October 2023	7th	
Atlas	(Mexico) Benjamín Mora	Sacked	30 October 2023	(Mexico) Omar Flores (Interim)	31 October 2023	13th	
Pre–Clausura changes
Atlas	(Mexico) Omar Flores (Interim)	End of tenure as caretaker	24 November 2023	(Spain) Beñat San José	24 November 2023	Pre-season	
Cruz Azul	(Mexico) Joaquín Moreno	Sacked	29 November 2023	(Argentina) Martín Anselmi	20 December 2023	Pre-season	
Toluca	(Uruguay) Carlos María Morales	End of tenure as caretaker	4 December 2023	(Portugal) Renato Paiva	4 December 2023	Pre-season	
UNAM	(Argentina) Antonio Mohamed	Resigned	12 December 2023	(Argentina) Gustavo Lema	12 December 2023	Pre-season	
Guadalajara	(Serbia) Veljko Paunović	Resigned	15 December 2023	(Argentina) Fernando Gago	21 December 2023	Pre-season	
León	(Argentina) Nicolás Larcamón	Signed by Cruzeiro	20 December 2023	(Uruguay) Jorge Bava	21 December 2023	Pre-season	
Clausura changes
Juárez	(Mexico) Diego Mejía	Sacked	30 January 2024	(Mexico) Tomás Campos and (Mexico) Juan Antonio Torres (Interim)	2 February 2024	17th	
Juárez	(Mexico) Tomás Campos and (Mexico) Juan Antonio Torres (Interim)	End of tenure as caretakers	9 February 2024	(Brazil) Maurício Barbieri	9 February 2024	18th	
Santos Laguna	(Uruguay) Pablo Repetto	Sacked	11 February 2024	(Mexico) Ignacio Ambríz	12 February 2024	15th	
Puebla	(Mexico) Ricardo Carbajal	Sacked	24 February 2024	(Venezuela) Fernando Aristeguieta (Interim)	24 February 2024	17th	
Puebla	(Venezuela) Fernando Aristeguieta (Interim)	End of tenure as caretaker	12 March 2024	(Argentina) Andrés Carevic	12 March 2024	17th	
Mazatlán	(Spain) Ismael Rescalvo	Sacked	8 April 2024	(Mexico) Gilberto Adame (Interim)	8 April 2024	15th	

== Torneo Apertura ==
The Apertura 2023 is the first tournament of the season and began on 30 June 2023. The defending champions are UANL. The season was paused in mid-July due to the 2023 Leagues Cup and was resumed on 18 August. On 8 July 2023, the match between Querétaro and América was postponed due to poor pitch condition.

=== Regular phase ===
==== League table ====
Pos	Team	Pld	W	D	L	GF	GA	GD	Pts	Qualification
1	América (C)	17	12	4	1	37	14	+23	40	Qualification for the quarter-finals (Note: The first four places in the table will qualify for the Liguilla quarter-finals and host the second leg.)
2	Monterrey	17	10	3	4	27	15	+12	33	Qualification for the quarter-finals
3	Tigres	17	8	6	3	32	18	+14	30	Qualification for the quarter-finals
4	Pumas	17	8	4	5	27	18	+9	28	Qualification for the quarter-finals
5	Guadalajara	17	8	3	6	22	22	0	27	Qualification for the quarter-finals
6	Puebla	17	7	4	6	24	25	−1	25 (Note: Puebla was penalized for having unregistered assistant coach Luis Miguel Noriega on the bench in their Week 7 match against Tijuana. Puebla originally won the match 3–0 and was awarded to Tijuana as a 1–0 victory. The Court of Arbitration for Sport later reversed the ruling.)	Qualification for the quarter-finals
7	Atlético San Luis	17	7	2	8	31	26	+5	23	Qualification for the play-in round (Note: Teams ranked 7th to 10th will qualify for the play-in round.)
8	León	17	6	5	6	23	22	+1	23	Qualification for the play-in round
9	Santos Laguna	17	7	2	8	31	34	−3	23	Qualification for the play-in round
10	Mazatlán	17	6	4	7	25	27	−2	22	Qualification for the play-in round
11	Pachuca	17	5	7	5	16	27	−11	22	
12	Toluca	17	5	6	6	23	19	+4	21	
13	Tijuana	17	6	2	9	23	26	−3	20	
14	Querétaro	17	5	4	8	18	29	−11	19	
15	Juárez	17	5	3	9	24	34	−10	18	
16	Cruz Azul	17	5	2	10	21	29	−8	17	
17	Atlas	17	4	5	8	14	24	−10	17	
18	Necaxa	17	3	6	8	18	27	−9	15	

Source: Liga MX
Rules for classification: 1) Points; 2) Goal difference; 3) Number of goals scored; 4) Head-to-head results between tied teams; 5) Number of goals scored away; 6) Highest relegation coefficient; 7) Fair Play points
(C) Champions

=== Results ===
Teams will play every other team once (either at home or away), completing a total of 17 rounds.

Home \ Away	AMÉ	ATL	ASL	CAZ	GUA	JUÁ	LEÓ	MAZ	MON	NEC	PAC	PUE	QUE	SAN	TIJ	TOL	UNL	UNM
América	—	1–1 (Note: Match was originally an Atlas home match but was moved to Estadio Azteca due to poor field conditions at Estadio Jalisco.)	—	—	4–0	1–2	1–1	—	—	3–2	4–0	3–0	—	4–3	3–0	—	—	1–0
Atlas	—	—	—	2–0	—	—	—	1–3	—	0–0	0–2	2–3	—	—	—	0–0	2–0	—
Atlético San Luis	0–1	2–0	—	1–2	—	—	3–0	3–2	1–1	4–0	—	—	4–1	0–2	—	—	—	—
Cruz Azul	2–3	—	—	—	—	2–0	1–0	—	—	—	—	1–2	1–3	2–2	—	0–2	—	1–4
Guadalajara	—	4–1	3–1	1–0	—	—	—	1–3	1–2	2–0	0–0	—	—	—	1–0	—	0–4	—
Juárez	—	1–2	3–2	—	1–1	—	—	3–1	—	—	0–1	—	0–3	—	—	—	1–1	4–1
León	—	1–1	—	—	1–2	2–1	—	2–1	—	1–1	4–0	—	—	—	1–0	1–0	—	1–1
Mazatlán	1–2	—	—	2–2	—	—	—	—	0–3	—	1–1	1–0	3–0	3–1	—		2–3	—
Monterrey	0–3	1–0	1–1	1–2	2–1	3–1	3–1	3–0	—	3–0	2–0	1–1	0–0	3–0	3–1	0–1	0–1	1–0
Necaxa	—	—	—	1–3	—	1–1	—	4–0	—	—	—	1–2	0–1	—	1–1	—	0–3	1–0
Pachuca	—	—	0–2	1–0	—	—	—	—		1–1	—	1–1	—	3–2	—	—	1–1	1–1
Puebla	—	—	1–2	—	0–2	1–0	5–4	—	1–1	—	—	—	—	2–3	3–0	—	—	0–2
Querétaro	1–2	1–2	—	—	1–2	—	1–1	—	0–0	—	1–1	1–1	—	—	1–0	—	—	—
Santos Laguna	—	0–0	—	—	2–1	5–1	0–2	—	—	2–5	—	—	0–2	—	2–1	3–1	—	2–1
Tijuana	—	2–0	2–1	2–1	—	5–1	—	1–1	—	—	2–3	—	—	—	—	2–1	2–0	2–3
Toluca	1–1	—	3–1	—	1–1	2–4	—	—	1–0	0–0	5–0	0–1	3–1	—	—	—	—	—
UANL	0–0	—	2–2	2–1	—	—	1–0	—	3–0	—	—	1–1	5–0	3–2	—	2–2	—	—
UNAM	—	3–0	3–2	—	1–0	—	—	0–0	0–1	—	—	—	4–0	—	—	1–1	2–1	—

Source: Liga MX
Legend: Blue = home team win; Yellow = draw; Red = away team win.
For upcoming matches, an "a" indicates there is an article about the rivalry between the two participants.

=== Individual statistics ===
==== Top goalscorers ====
Players sorted first by goals scored, then by last name.

Rank	Player	Club	Goals
1	(Colombia) Harold Preciado	Santos Laguna	11
2	(Mexico) Guillermo Martínez	Puebla	10
3	(France) André-Pierre Gignac	UANL	9
3	(Paraguay) Carlos González	Tijuana	9
3	(Mexico) Ángel Sepúlveda	Cruz Azul/Querétaro	9
6	(Argentina) Juan Brunetta	Santos Laguna	8
6	(Mexico) César Huerta	UNAM	8
8	(Mexico) Roberto Alvarado	Guadalajara	6
8	(Argentina) Juan Dinenno	UNAM	6
8	(Brazil) Vitinho	Atlético de San Luis	6
8	(Mexico) Rogelio Funes Mori	Monterrey	6
8	(Colombia) Avilés Hurtado	Juárez	6
8	(Argentina) Nicolás Ibáñez	UANL	6
8	(Ivory Coast) Aké Loba	Mazatlán	6
8	(Colombia) Julián Quiñones	América	6
8	(Uruguay) Jonathan Rodríguez	América	6
8	(Chile) Diego Valdés	América	6
8	(Uruguay) Federico Viñas	León	6
8	(Colombia) Raúl Zúñiga	Querétaro	6

Source: Liga MX

==== Top assists ====
Rank	Player	Club	Assists
1	(Argentina) Juan Brunetta	Santos Laguna	11
2	(Paraguay) Josué Colmán	Mazatlán	7
3	(Colombia) Brayan Angulo	Puebla	6
4	(Colombia) Julián Quiñones	América	5
5	(Mexico) Uriel Antuna	Cruz Azul	4
5	(Mexico) Pablo Barrera	Querétaro	4
5	(France) André-Pierre Gignac	UANL	4
5	(Mexico) Rodrigo Huescas	Cruz Azul	4
5	(Mexico) Henry Martín	América	4
5	(Argentina) Maximiliano Meza	Monterrey	4
5	(Colombia) Luis Quiñones	UANL	4
5	(Mexico) Marcel Ruiz	Toluca	4
5	(Uruguay) Juan Manuel Sanabria	Atlético San Luis	4
5	(Paraguay) Richard Sánchez	América	4
5	(Mexico) Dieter Villalpando	Atlético San Luis	4

Source: Soccerway

==== Clean sheets ====
Rank	Player	Club	Clean sheets	Avg.
1	(Mexico) Luis Malagón	América	6	0.79
1	(Argentina) Esteban Andrada	Monterrey	6	0.94
3	(Mexico) Julio González	UNAM	5	1.06
3	(Brazil) Tiago Volpi	Toluca	5	1.12
3	(Argentina) Nahuel Guzmán	UANL	5	1.13
3	(Mexico) Miguel Jiménez	Guadalajara	5	1.31
3	(Colombia) Camilo Vargas	Atlas	5	1.41
8	(Mexico) Rodolfo Cota	León	4	1.31
8	(Mexico) Guillermo Allison	Querétaro	4	1.42
8	(Mexico) Hugo González	Mazatlán	4	1.44
8	(Mexico) Carlos Moreno	Pachuca	4	1.50

Source: FBRef

==== Hat-tricks ====
Player	For	Against	Result	Date	Round
(Mexico) Ángel Sepúlveda	Cruz Azul	Necaxa	3–1 (A)	4 October 2023	11
(Mexico) Guillermo Martínez	Puebla	León	5–4 (H)	3 November 2023	16
(Colombia) Raúl Zúñiga	Querétaro	Juárez	3–0 (A)	5 November 2023	16
(Mexico) Érick Sánchez	Pachuca	Tijuana	3–2 (A)	10 November 2023	17

(H) – Home; (A) – Away

==== Scoring ====
- First goal of the season:
  (Argentina) Leonardo Suárez for América against Juárez (30 June 2023)
- Last goal of the season:
  (Uruguay) Federico Viñas for León against Juárez (12 November 2023)

==== Discipline ====
Player

- Most yellow cards: 7
  - (Mexico) Jesús Angulo (UANL)
  - (Argentina) Gustavo Cabral (Pachuca)
  - (Paraguay) Juan Escobar (Cruz Azul)
  - (Chile) Sebastián Vegas (Monterrey)
- Most red cards: 2
  - (Paraguay) Luis Amarilla (Mazatlán)
  - (Argentina) Javier Correa (Santos Laguna)
  - (Mexico) Jair Díaz (Mazatlán)
  - (Mexico) Omar Mendoza (Querétaro)
  - (Chile) Jean Meneses (Toluca)

Team

- Most yellow cards: 56
  - UNAM
- Most red cards: 6
  - Mazatlán
  - Toluca
- Fewest yellow cards: 29
  - Tijuana
- Fewest red cards: 0
  - Puebla
  - UANL

Source: Liga MX

=== Attendance ===
Pos	Team	Total	High	Low	Average	Change
1	UANL	359,138	41,615	36,738	39,904	+2.4%
2	Monterrey	298,265	47,177	25,292	37,283	−14.5%
3	América	354,231	62,707	17,046	35,423	−6.2%
4	Guadalajara	301,985	38,972	23,581	33,554	+5.6%^{1}
5	Toluca	216,304	27,273	21,941	24,034	−3.9%
6	Tijuana	198,497	28,333	17,333	22,055	−6.3%
7	León	189,827	25,288	15,015	21,092	−8.1%
8	UNAM	168,659	46,823	8,074	21,082	+13.8%
9	Cruz Azul	155,169	36,500	9,358	19,396	−33.7%
10	Atlético San Luis	144,957	22,584	12,277	16,106	−0.6%
11	Atlas	100,852	20,169	9,089	14,407	−17.4%
12	Querétaro	114,310	31,296	6,486	14,289	−23.6%
13	Puebla	107,971	29,026	7,700	13,496	−22.6%
14	Mazatlán	106,360	18,000	7,429	11,818	+4.8%
15	Santos Laguna	102,625	16,176	7,038	11,403	−34.0%
16	Juárez	87,746	14,976	7,091	10,968	−17.8%
17	Necaxa	78,473	13,585	6,789	9,809	−28.1%
18	Pachuca	74,263	19,805	4,673	9,283	−39.0%
	League total	3,159,632	62,707	4,673	20,651	−10.8%

Source: Liga MX
Notes:
Only regular season listed.
1: Guadalajara played their week 14 match vs UANL at Estadio Jalisco due to poor field conditions at Estadio Akron.

==== Highest and lowest ====
Highest attended					Lowest attended			
Week	Home	Score	Away	Attendance	Home	Score	Away	Attendance
1	UANL	1–1	Puebla	41,615	Mazatlán	1–1	Pachuca	8,479
2	Monterrey	1–0	Atlas	38,156	Juárez	1–1	UANL	9,663
3	UANL	1–0	León	41,615	Pachuca	1–1	UNAM	9,396
4	Monterrey	3–1	Tijuana	31,921	Querétaro	1–1	Pachuca	6,486
5	Guadalajara	1–0	Tijuana	27,547	Mazatlán	1–0	Puebla	7,429
6	Monterrey	1–2	Cruz Azul	42,313	Necaxa	0–1	Querétaro	7,289
7	UANL	5–0	Querétaro	40,273	Puebla	3–0	Tijuana	7,700
8	América	4–0	Guadalajara	62,514	Pachuca	3–2	Santos Laguna	4,673
9	UANL	3–0	Monterrey	41,615	Santos Laguna	2–5	Necaxa	10,038
10	América	1–0	UNAM	62,707	Pachuca	1–1	Necaxa	8,193
11	UANL	2–2	Toluca	37,117	Santos Laguna	2–1	Tijuana	7,038
12	Guadalajara	4–1	Atlas	38,972	Santos Laguna	0–2	León	7,429
13	UANL	2–1	Cruz Azul	41,615	Querétaro	1–0	Tijuana	7,908
14	Monterrey	0–3	América	47,177	Pachuca	1–1	Puebla	7,876
15	Monterrey	3–0	Necaxa	25,292	Atlas	0–2	Pachuca	9,089
16	América	3–0	Tijuana	46,046	Necaxa	4–0	Mazatlán	6,789
17	UNAM	1–0	Guadalajara	46,823	Atlas	0–0	Necaxa	11,128

Source: Liga MX

1. Does not include matches played behind closed doors.

=== Final phase ===
==== Play-in round ====
The 9th place team hosts the 10th place team in an elimination game. The 7th hosts the 8th place team in the double-chance game, with the winner advancing as the 7-seed. The loser of this game then hosts the winner of the elimination game between the 9th and 10th place teams to determine the 8-seed.

Play-in matches
Serie A
7	Atlético San Luis	3
8	León	2
Serie B
9	Santos Laguna	2
10	Mazatlán	1

No. 8 seed match
8	León	3
9	Santos Laguna	2

Final seeds
7	Atlético San Luis	No. 7 seed
8	León	No. 8 seed

===== Play-in matches =====
Team 1	Score	Team 2
Atlético San Luis	3–2	León
Santos Laguna	2–1	Mazatlán

Team 1	Score	Team 2
León	3–2	Santos Laguna

==== Bracket ====
Quarter-finals
1	América	2	2	4
8	León	2	0	2
2	Monterrey	0	1	1
7	Atlético San Luis	1	1	2
3	UANL	2	3	5
6	Puebla	2	0	2
4	UNAM	0	3	3
5	Guadalajara	1	0	1

Semi-finals
1	América	5	0	5
7	Atlético San Luis	0	2	2
3	UANL	1	1	2
4	UNAM	0	1	1

Finals
1	América (a.e.t.)	1	3	4
3	UANL	1	0	1

- Teams will be re-seeded each round.
- The team with more goals on aggregate after two matches will advance.
- If the two teams were tied on aggregate, the higher seeded team will advance (the away goals rule was not applied).
- In the final, if the two teams are tied after both legs, they will go to extra time and, if necessary, a penalty shoot-out.
- Both finalists will qualify for the 2025 CONCACAF Champions Cup.

==== Quarterfinals ====
Team 1	Agg.	Team 2	1st leg	2nd leg
León	2–4	América	2–2	0–2
Atlético San Luis	2–1	Monterrey	1–0	1–1
Puebla	2–5	UANL	2–2	0–3
Guadalajara	1–3	UNAM	1–0	0–3

==== Semifinals ====
Team 1	Agg.	Team 2	1st leg	2nd leg
Atlético San Luis	2–5	América	0–5	2–0
UNAM	1–2	UANL	0–1	1–1

==== Finals ====
Team 1	Agg.	Team 2	1st leg	2nd leg
UANL	1–4	América	1–1	0–3 (a.e.t.)

14 December 2023
21:00 CST (UTC−6)

UANL	1–1	América
Herrera 71'	Report	Martín 51' (pen.)

Estadio Universitario, San Nicolás de los Garza
Attendance: 41,615
Referee: Marco Antonio Ortiz (Durango)
17 December 2023
19:30 CST (UTC−6)

América	3–0 (a.e.t.)	UANL
Quiñones 91'; Sánchez 104'; J. Rodríguez 120'	Report

Estadio Azteca, Mexico City
Attendance: 74,957
Referee: Adonai Escobedo (Aguascalientes)

América won 4–1 on aggregate.

== Torneo Clausura ==
The Clausura tournament began on 12 January 2024.

=== Regular phase ===
==== League table ====
Pos	Team	Pld	W	D	L	GF	GA	GD	Pts	Qualification
1	América (C)	17	10	5	2	30	12	+18	35	Qualification for the quarter-finals (Note: The first four places in the table will qualify for the Liguilla quarter-finals and host the second leg. The fifth and sixth placed teams will host the first leg.)
2	Cruz Azul	17	10	3	4	23	14	+9	33	Qualification for the quarter-finals
3	Toluca	17	9	5	3	38	23	+15	32	Qualification for the quarter-finals
4	Monterrey	17	9	5	3	32	19	+13	32	Qualification for the quarter-finals
5	Tigres	17	9	4	4	34	23	+11	31	Qualification for the quarter-finals
6	Guadalajara	17	9	4	4	24	17	+7	31	Qualification for the quarter-finals
7	Pachuca	17	9	2	6	34	27	+7	29	Qualification for the play-in round (Note: Teams ranked 7th to 10th will qualify for the play-in round.)
8	Pumas	17	7	6	4	27	22	+5	27	Qualification for the play-in round
9	Necaxa	17	7	6	4	30	29	+1	27	Qualification for the play-in round
10	Querétaro	17	6	6	5	22	21	+1	24	Qualification for the play-in round
11	León	17	7	3	7	23	25	−2	24	
12	Juárez	17	4	4	9	19	26	−7	16	
13	Atlético San Luis	17	5	1	11	25	35	−10	16	
14	Mazatlán	17	4	4	9	21	32	−11	16	
15	Santos Laguna	17	4	3	10	15	28	−13	15	
16	Tijuana	17	2	8	7	21	30	−9	14	Team is last place in the coefficient table (Note: Team ranked last in the coefficient table is ineligible for the final phase.)
17	Atlas	17	3	5	9	21	31	−10	14	
18	Puebla	17	1	2	14	18	43	−25	5	

Source: Liga MX
Rules for classification: 1) Points; 2) Goal difference; 3) Number of goals scored; 4) Head-to-head results between tied teams; 5) Number of goals scored away; 6) Highest relegation coefficient; 7) Fair Play points
(C) Champions

=== Results ===
Home \ Away	AMÉ	ATL	ASL	CAZ	GUA	JUÁ	LEÓ	MAZ	MON	NEC	PAC	PUE	QUE	SAN	TIJ	TOL	UNL	UNM
América	—	—	2–1	1–0	—	—	—	2–2	1–1	—	—	—	2–0	—	—	5–1	2–0	—
Atlas	1–5	—	2–1	—	0–1	2–1	0–1	—	1–2	—	—	—	2–3	3–0	0–0	—	—	0–0
Atlético San Luis	—	—	—	—	0–2	2–3	—	—	—	—	2–1	4–0	—	—	3–3	1–5	1–2	3–1
Cruz Azul	—	2–2	3–0	—	3–0	—	—	2–1	2–1	1–2	0–1	—	—	—	1–0	—	1–0	—
Guadalajara	0–0	—	—	—	—	2–1	1–2	—	—	—	—	3–2	2–0	1–1	—	3–2	—	3–1
Juárez	0–2	—	—	0–0	—	—	1–1	—	0–3	2–2	—	4–3	—	2–1	0–1	1–1	—	—
León	0–1	—	1–0	2–3	—	—	—	—	2–0	—	—	2–1	0–2	3–2	—	—	1–2	—
Mazatlán	—	2–0	0–1	—	2–2	0–2	2–2	—	—	2–1	—	—	—	—	2–0	—	—	0–4
Monterrey	—	—	3–1	—	0–2	—	—	2–1	—	—	3–2	2–0	1–1	—	—	0–0	3–3	3–0
Necaxa	0–0	2–1	3–1	—	1–0	—	1–2	—	2–5	—	1–1	—	—	2–0	—	3–3	—	—
Pachuca	2–1	4–3	—	—	0–1	3–2	3–2	1–1	—	—	—	—	1–2	—	3–2	2–3	—	—
Puebla	1–2	2–2	—	0–1	—	—	—	3–2	—	1–2	1–4	—	0–2	—	—	1–1	2–3	—
Querétaro	—	—	4–1	1–3	—	1–0	—	0–2	—	1–1	—	—	—	0–1	—	2–2	1–1	1–1
Santos Laguna	1–1	—	0–3	3–0	—	—	—	1–0	0–2	—	0–2	3–0	—	—	—	—	0–3	—
Tijuana	0–2	—	—	—	1–1	—	1–1	—	1–1	2–3	—	3–1	1–1	2–2	—	—	—	—
Toluca	—	4–1	—	0–1	—	—	4–1	4–1	—	—	—	—	—	1–0	2–0	—	2–1	3–0
UANL	—	1–1	—	—	1–0	1–0	—	5–1	—	5–2	0–3	—	—	—	4–1	—	—	2–2
UNAM	2–1	—	—	0–0	—	1–0	1–0	—	—	2–2	3–1	3–0	—	3–0	3–3	—	—	—

First match(es) will be played: complete. Source: Liga MX
Legend: Blue = home team win; Yellow = draw; Red = away team win.
For upcoming matches, an "a" indicates there is an article about the rivalry between the two participants.

=== Individual statistics ===
==== Top goalscorers ====
Players sorted first by goals scored, then by last name.

Rank	Player	Club	Goals
1	(Mexico) Uriel Antuna	Cruz Azul	8
1	(Colombia) Diber Cambindo	Necaxa	8
1	(Venezuela) Salomón Rondón	Pachuca	8
1	(Uruguay) Federico Viñas	León	8
5	(Paraguay) Luis Amarilla	Mazatlán	7
5	(Argentina) Juan Brunetta	UANL	7
5	(Spain) Sergio Canales	Monterrey	7
8	(Mexico) Eduardo Aguirre	Atlas	6
8	(Mexico) Víctor Guzmán	Guadalajara	6
8	(Mexico) Henry Martín	América	6
8	(Mexico) Guillermo Martínez	UNAM	6
8	(Chile) Jean Meneses	Toluca	6
8	(Mexico) Julián Quiñones	América	6
8	(Colombia) Christian Rivera	Tijuana	6
8	(United States) Brandon Vazquez	Monterrey	6
8	(Mexico) Alexis Vega	Toluca	6

Source:Liga MX

==== Top assists ====
Rank	Player	Club	Assists
1	(Morocco) Oussama Idrissi	Pachuca	8
2	(Mexico) César Huerta	UNAM	7
3	(Mexico) Ricardo Monreal	Necaxa	6
4	(Mexico) Roberto Alvarado	Guadalajara	5
4	(Mexico) Pablo Barrera	Querétaro	5
4	(Chile) Jean Meneses	Toluca	5
7	(Mexico) Efraín Álvarez	Tijuana	4
7	(Argentina) Juan Brunetta	UANL	4
7	(Spain) Sergio Canales	Monterrey	4
7	(Mexico) Brian García	Toluca	4
7	(Mexico) Ozziel Herrera	UANL	4
7	(Argentina) Nicolás Ibáñez	UANL	4
7	(Mexico) Henry Martín	América	4
7	(Argentina) Jorge Rodríguez	Monterrey	4
7	(Mexico) Carlos Orrantia	Toluca	4
7	(Argentina) Eduardo Salvio	UNAM	4
7	(Uruguay) Juan Manuel Sanabria	Atlético San Luis	4
7	(Mexico) Érick Sánchez	Pachuca	4
7	(Mexico) Ángel Sepúlveda	Cruz Azul	4
7	(Argentina) Leonardo Suárez	UNAM	4
7	(Mexico) Alexis Vega	Toluca	4

Source: Soccerway

==== Clean sheets ====
Rank	Player	Club	Clean sheets	Avg.
1	(Colombia) Kevin Mier	Cruz Azul	8	0.82
2	(Mexico) Luis Malagón	América	7	0.73
2	(Mexico) Julio González	UNAM	7	1.29
4	(Mexico) Raúl Rangel	Guadalajara	6	1.00
5	(Argentina) Esteban Andrada	Monterrey	5	1.06
6	(Brazil) Tiago Volpi	Toluca	4	1.35
6	(Mexico) Carlos Acevedo	Santos Laguna	4	1.65
8	(Mexico) Rodolfo Cota	León	3	1.50
8	(Mexico) Carlos Moreno	Pachuca	3	1.53
8	(Argentina) Ezequiel Unsain	Necaxa	3	1.71
8	(Colombia) Camilo Vargas	Atlas	3	1.82
8	(Mexico) Andrés Sánchez	Atlético San Luis	3	1.93

Source: Mediotiempo

==== Hat-tricks ====
Player	For	Against	Result	Date	Round
(Colombia) Christian Rivera	Tijuana	UNAM	3–3 (A)	10 March 2024	11
(Mexico) Marcelo Flores	UANL	Necaxa	5–2 (H)	20 April 2024	16

(H) – Home; (A) – Away

==== Scoring ====
- First goal of the season:
  (Uruguay) Emanuel Gularte for Querétaro against Toluca (12 January 2024)
- Last goal of the season:
  (Mexico) Heriberto Jurado for Necaxa against Monterrey (28 April 2024)

==== Discipline ====
Player

- Most yellow cards: 9
  - (Argentina) Miguel Barbieri (Querétaro)
- Most red cards: 3
  - (Peru) Anderson Santamaría (Atlas)

Team

- Most yellow cards: 54
  - Querétaro
- Most red cards: 8
  - Atlas
- Fewest yellow cards: 26
  - Monterrey
- Fewest red cards: 0
  - Juárez
  - Pachuca
  - Tijuana
  - Toluca

Source: Liga MX

=== Attendance ===
Pos	Team	Total	High	Low	Average	Change
1	Monterrey	390,201	52,579	32,263	43,356	+16.3%
2	América	295,136	65,644	18,199	42,162	+19.0%
3	UANL	311,091	41,036	34,731	38,886	−2.6%
4	Guadalajara	290,357	42,650	33,541	36,295	+8.2%
5	Cruz Azul	239,694	67,623	13,585	29,962	+54.5%^{1}
6	UNAM	229,343	44,670	17,488	25,483	+20.9%
7	Toluca	201,946	27,273	21,297	25,243	+5.0%
8	León	182,965	27,032	18,271	22,871	+8.4%
9	Tijuana	166,264	31,133	14,333	20,783	−5.8%
10	Atlas	204,236	40,694	10,750	20,424	+41.8%
11	Necaxa	157,956	20,837	13,663	17,551	+78.9%
12	Puebla	157,256	42,320	9,480	17,473	+29.5%
13	Atlético San Luis	137,441	22,262	12,581	17,180	+6.7%
14	Santos Laguna	132,820	28,596	9,550	16,603	+45.6%
15	Pachuca	145,755	20,804	9,205	16,195	+74.5%
16	Querétaro	132,982	24,777	8,784	14,776	+3.4%
17	Juárez	105,341	18,033	9,169	11,705	+6.7%
18	Mazatlán	90,616	17,787	8,957	11,327	−4.2%
	League total	3,571,400	67,623	8,784	23,342	+13.0%

Source: Liga MX
Notes:
Only regular season listed.
1: Cruz Azul played its home match vs Guadalajara at Estadio Azteca.

==== Highest and lowest ====
Highest attended					Lowest attended			
Week	Home	Score	Away	Attendance	Home	Score	Away	Attendance
1	Guadalajara	1–1	Santos Laguna	36,743	Mazatlán	0–1	Atlético San Luis	9,510
2	UANL	1–0	Guadalajara	40,283	Puebla	1–2	Necaxa	11,272
3	Monterrey	3–1	Atlético San Luis	44,386	Querétaro	1–1	UANL	14,846
4	Guadalajara	3–2	Toluca	35,998	Mazatlán	2–2	León	9,150
5	América	1–1	Monterrey	41,158	Juárez	2–2	Necaxa	9,197
6	Monterrey	3–2	Pachuca	46,211	Mazatlán	2–0	Atlas	8,957
7	Monterrey	0–0	Toluca	46,189	Juárez	4–3	Puebla	9,169
8	América	1–0	Cruz Azul	59,032	Puebla	0–2	Querétaro	9,480
9	UANL	1–0	Juárez	34,731	Querétaro	4–1	Atlético San Luis	8,784
10	Cruz Azul	3–0	Guadalajara	67,623	Mazatlán	2–1	Necaxa	11,480
11	América	2–0	UANL	45,063	Puebla	2–2	Atlas	10,051
12	Guadalajara	0–0	América	42,650	Querétaro	1–0	Juárez	9,603
13	Monterrey	0–2	Guadalajara	46,165	Mazatlán	2–0	Tijuana	11,218
14	UANL	0–3	Pachuca	38,147	Mazatlán	0–4	UNAM	12,620
15	América	5–1	Toluca	65,644	Juárez	0–1	Tijuana	10,076
16	UNAM	2–1	América	44,670	Mazatlán	0–2	Juárez	9,894
17	Puebla	1–2	América	42,320	Juárez	0–2	León	10,077

Source: Liga MX

1. Does not include matches played behind closed doors.

=== Final phase ===
==== Play-in round ====
The 9th place team hosts the 10th place team in an elimination game. The 7th hosts the 8th place team in the double-chance game, with the winner advancing as the 7-seed. The loser of this game then hosts the winner of the elimination game between the 9th and 10th place teams to determine the 8-seed.

Play-in games
Serie A
7	Pachuca	0 (3)
8	UNAM (p)	0 (5)
Serie B
9	Necaxa (p)	1 (3)
10	Querétaro	1 (2)

No. 8 seed game
7	Pachuca	2
9	Necaxa	1

Final seeds
8	UNAM	No. 7 seed
7	Pachuca	No. 8 seed

===== Play-in matches =====
Team 1	Score	Team 2
Pachuca	0–0 (3–5 p)	UNAM
Necaxa	1–1 (3–2 p)	Querétaro

Team 1	Score	Team 2
Pachuca	2–1	Necaxa

==== Bracket ====
Quarter-finals
1	América (s)	1	1	2
8	Pachuca	1	1	2
3	Toluca	0	0	0
6	Guadalajara	1	0	1
2	Cruz Azul	2	2	4
7	UNAM	0	2	2
4	Monterrey	2	1	3
5	UANL	1	1	2

Semi-finals
1	América	0	1	1
6	Guadalajara	0	0	0
2	Cruz Azul (s)	1	1	2
4	Monterrey	0	2	2

Finals
1	América	1	1	2
2	Cruz Azul	1	0	1

- Teams will be re-seeded each round.
- The team with more goals on aggregate after two matches will advance.
- If the two teams were tied on aggregate, the higher seeded team will advance (the away goals rule was not applied).
- In the final, if the two teams are tied after both legs, they will go to extra time and, if necessary, a penalty shoot-out.
- Both finalists will qualify for the 2025 CONCACAF Champions Cup.

==== Quarterfinals ====
Team 1	Agg.	Team 2	1st leg	2nd leg
Pachuca	2–2	América (s)	1–1	1–1
UNAM	2–4	Cruz Azul	0–2	2–2
Guadalajara	1–0	Toluca	1–0	0–0
UANL	2–3	Monterrey	1–2	1–1

==== Semifinals ====
Team 1	Agg.	Team 2	1st leg	2nd leg
Guadalajara	0–1	América	0–0	0–1
Monterrey	2–2 (s)	Cruz Azul	0–1	2–1

==== Finals ====
Team 1	Agg.	Team 2	1st leg	2nd leg
Cruz Azul	1–2	América	1–1	0–1

23 May 2024
20:00 CST (UTC−6)

Cruz Azul	1–1	América
Antuna 9' (pen.)	Report	Quiñones 16'

Estadio Ciudad de los Deportes, Mexico City
Attendance: 27,224
Referee: Fernando Hernández Gómez (Mexico City)
26 May 2024
19:00 CST (UTC−6)

América	1–0	Cruz Azul
Martín 78' (pen.)	Report

Estadio Azteca, Mexico City
Attendance: 73,604
Referee: Marco Antonio Ortiz (Durango)

América won 2–1 on aggregate.

== Coefficient table ==
As of the 2020–21 season, the promotion and relegation between Liga MX and Liga de Expansión MX (formerly known as Ascenso MX) was suspended, however, the coefficient table will be used to establish the payment of fines that will be used for the development of the clubs of the silver circuit.

Per Article 24 of the competition regulations, the payment of $MXN160 million will be distributed among the last three positioned in the coefficient table as follows: 80 million in the last place; 47 million the penultimate; and 33 million will be paid by the sixteenth team in the table, as of the 2021–22 season the remaining $MXN80 million will be paid through the financial remnants generated by the Liga MX itself. The team that finishes last on the table will start the following season with a coefficient of zero. If the last ranked team, which was Querétaro, repeats as the last ranked team in the 2023–24 season coefficient table, they will be fined an additional $MXN20 million.

Pos	Team	'21 A Pts	'22 C Pts	'22 A Pts	'23 C Pts	'23 A Pts	'24 C Pts	Total Pts	Total Pld	Avg	GD	Fine
1	América	35	26	38	34	40	35	208	102	2.0392	+95	Safe from paying any fine
2	Monterrey	22	26	35	40	33	32	188	102	1.8431	+69	Safe from paying any fine
3	UANL	28	33	30	25	29	31	177	102	1.7353	+60	Safe from paying any fine
4	Pachuca	18	38	32	31	22	29	170	102	1.6667	+30	Safe from paying any fine
5	Guadalajara	22	26	22	34	27	31	162	102	1.5882	+23	Safe from paying any fine
6	Toluca	24	19	27	32	21	32	155	102	1.5196	+23	Safe from paying any fine
7	León	29	21	22	30	23	24	149	102	1.4608	+6	Safe from paying any fine
8	Cruz Azul	23	25	24	24	17	33	146	102	1.4314	–1	Safe from paying any fine
9	Santos Laguna	24	20	33	19	23	15	134	102	1.3137	–6	Safe from paying any fine
10	UNAM	21	22	14	18	28	27	130	102	1.2745	–7	Safe from paying any fine
11	Querétaro	0	0	0	0	19	24	43	34	1.2647	–10	Safe from paying any fine
12	Puebla	24	26	22	20	25	5	122	102	1.1961	–24	Safe from paying any fine
13	Atlas	29	27	13	21	17	14	121	102	1.1863	–9	Safe from paying any fine
14	Atlético San Luis	20	23	18	19	23	16	119	102	1.1667	–23	Safe from paying any fine
15	Necaxa	20	23	19	14	15	27	118	102	1.1569	–29	Safe from paying any fine
16	Mazatlán (F)	20	21	17	7	22	16	103	102	1.0098	–52	MXN$33 million
17	Juárez (F)	0	0	19	15	18	16	68	68	1.0000	–26	MXN$47 million
18	Tijuana (F)	15	17	17	16	20	14	99	102	0.9706	–57	MXN$80 million

Rules for fine payment: 1) Fine coefficient; 2) Goal difference; 3) Number of goals scored; 4) Head-to-head results between tied teams; 5) Number of goals scored away; 6) Fair Play points
F = Team will have to pay fine indicated
Source: Liga MX

1. 2021–22 and 2022–23 accumulated points are not counted towards their relegation coefficient.
2. 2020–21 accumulated points are not counted towards their relegation coefficient.

== Aggregate tables ==
=== 2023–24 aggregate table ===
The 2023–24 aggregate table (the sum of points of both the Apertura 2023 and Clausura 2024 seasons) is used to determine the participants for the 2025 CONCACAF Champions Cup. Normally, the league champion with more points at the end of the Apertura 2023 and Clausura 2024 seasons qualified directly for the 2024 CONCACAF Champions Cup round of 16 while the champion with fewer points, both runners-up of Apertura and Clausura, and the next two best-ranked teams qualified for the 2024 CONCACAF Champions Cup first round. Since América won both tournaments, they qualified directly to the 2025 CONCACAF Champions Cup round of 16. As a result, both the Apertura and Clausura runners-up and the next three best-ranked teams also qualify for the 2025 CONCACAF Champions Cup first round. The first-place club also received US$1 million in prize money and recognition in 2024 Balón de Oro.

Pos	Team	Pld	W	D	L	GF	GA	GD	Pts	Qualification or relegation
1	América (A, C)	34	22	9	3	67	26	+41	75	Qualification for the CONCACAF Champions Cup Round of 16
2	Monterrey	34	19	8	7	59	34	+25	65	Qualification for the CONCACAF Champions Cup Round One
3	UANL	34	17	10	7	66	41	+25	61	Qualification for the CONCACAF Champions Cup Round One
4	Guadalajara	34	17	7	10	46	39	+7	58	Qualification for the CONCACAF Champions Cup Round One
5	UNAM	34	15	10	9	54	40	+14	55	Qualification for the CONCACAF Champions Cup Round One
6	Toluca	34	14	11	9	61	42	+19	53	
7	Pachuca	34	14	9	11	50	54	−4	51	
8	Cruz Azul	34	15	5	14	44	43	+1	50	Qualification for the CONCACAF Champions Cup Round One
9	León	34	13	8	13	46	47	−1	47	
10	Querétaro	34	11	10	13	40	50	−10	43	
11	Necaxa	34	10	12	12	48	56	−8	42	
12	Atlético San Luis	34	12	3	19	56	61	−5	39	
13	Mazatlán	34	10	8	16	46	59	−13	38	
14	Santos Laguna	34	11	5	18	46	62	−16	38	
15	Tijuana	34	8	10	16	44	56	−12	34	
16	Juárez	34	9	7	18	43	60	−17	34	
17	Atlas	34	7	10	17	35	55	−20	31	
18	Puebla	34	8	6	20	42	68	−26	30	

Source: Liga MX
Rules for classification: 1) Points; 2) Goal difference; 3) Number of goals scored; 4) Head-to-head results between tied teams; 5) Number of goals scored away; 6) Highest relegation coefficient; 7) Fair Play points
(A) Apertura champion; (C) Clausura champion

=== 2023 aggregate table ===
The 2023 aggregate table (the sum of points of both the Clausura 2023 and Apertura 2023 seasons) was used to determine the seedings for the 2024 Leagues Cup.

Pos	Team	Pld	W	D	L	GF	GA	GD	Pts	Qualification or relegation
1	América	34	21	11	2	73	35	+38	74	Qualification for the 2024 Leagues Cup Round of 32
2	Monterrey	34	23	4	7	62	29	+33	73	
3	Guadalajara	34	18	7	9	50	40	+10	61	
4	UANL	34	15	10	9	52	35	+17	55	
5	Toluca	34	14	11	9	57	38	+19	53	
6	León	34	14	11	9	46	35	+11	53	
7	Pachuca	34	15	8	11	48	49	−1	53	
8	UNAM	34	13	7	14	51	50	+1	46	
9	Puebla	34	13	6	15	50	59	−9	45	
10	Atlético San Luis	34	12	6	16	47	47	0	42	
11	Santos Laguna	34	12	6	16	54	71	−17	42	
12	Cruz Azul	34	12	5	17	42	51	−9	41	
13	Querétaro	34	9	12	13	34	50	−16	39	
14	Atlas	34	8	14	12	41	46	−5	38	
15	Tijuana	34	9	9	16	42	55	−13	36	
16	Juárez	34	8	9	17	41	59	−18	33	
17	Necaxa	34	6	11	17	34	51	−17	29	
18	Mazatlán	34	8	5	21	44	68	−24	29	

Source: Liga MX
Rules for classification: 1) Points; 2) Goal difference; 3) Number of goals scored; 4) Head-to-head results between tied teams; 5) Number of goals scored away; 6) Highest relegation coefficient; 7) Fair Play points

== Awards ==
=== Semiannual awards ===
Clausura Best XI
Pos.	Player	Team
GK	(Mexico) Luis Malagón	América
DF	(Mexico) Israel Reyes	América
DF	(Mexico) Carlos Salcedo	Cruz Azul
DF	(Chile) Igor Lichnovsky	América
DF	(Mexico) Gerardo Arteaga	Monterrey
MF	(Mexico) Uriel Antuna	Cruz Azul
MF	(Mexico) Jonathan dos Santos	América
MF	(Mexico) César Huerta	Universidad Nacional
FW	(Mexico) Henry Martín	América
FW	(Venezuela) Salomón Rondón	Pachuca
FW	(Colombia) Diber Cambindo	Necaxa
Manager: (Brazil) André Jardine (América)

- Most Valuable Player

=== Annual awards ===
Balón de Oro awards
Award	Winner (club)
Balón de Oro	Juan Brunetta (UANL)
Best Goalkeeper	Luis Malagón (América)
Best Center-back	Guido Pizarro (UANL)
Best Full-back	Jesús Alberto Angulo (UANL)
Best Defensive Midfielder	Jonathan dos Santos (América)
Best Attacking Midfielder	Juan Brunetta (UANL)
Best Forward	Salomón Rondón (Pachuca)
Goalscorer of the Season	Guillermo Martinez (Universidad Nacional)
Best Rookie	Yael Padilla (Guadalajara)
Best Goal	Javairô Dilrosun (América)
Best Manager	André Jardine (América)
Best Liga de Expansión MX Player	Édson Rivera (UdeG)
