= Baillères =

Baillères (Spanish pronunciation: [bajˈʝeres], also spelled Bailleres) is a surname of French origin. Notable people with the surname include:

- Alberto Baillères (1931–2022), Mexican billionaire businessman
- Alejandro Baillères (born 1960), Mexican businessman
- Raúl Baillères (1895–1967), Mexican businessman
