= 2024 Clausura Tournament =

Mexican soccer championship

The Clausura Tournament 2024 is the 111th edition of the League's Championship for First Division of Mexican soccer. It consists of the 56th short tournament, after a change in the competition's format, which the 2023–2024 season will end with.

== Changes ==
- The Estadio Azteca will follow a renovation for the upcoming 2026 World Cup. For this reason, the clubs America and Cruz Azul must temporarily relocate to the Estadio de la Ciudad de los Deportes, also located in the country's capital.

However, in the end, Emilio Azcárraga Jean, the owner of the "Águilas" confirmed the stadium's renovation will begin until May. As a result, the "azulcrema" club will be able to play their home matches at the Santa Úrsula Colossuem, prior to their temporary relocation.

== Competition system ==
The Liga BBVA MX tournament consists of two parts:

- Qualification Phase: is integrated by the 17 days of the tournament.
- Final Phase: is integrated by the "Play-In" Matches, Quarterfinals, Semifinals, and the Final.

=== Qualification phase ===
In the qualification phase, the points system is observed. The location of the general table is subject to the following conditions:

- For each game won, three points will be obtained.
- For each tied game, one point will be obtained.
- For each game lost, no points will be granted.

In this phase, the 18 clubs of the Liga BBVA MX participate, playing in each tournament as 'all against all' throughout the 17 respective match days, one game at a time.

At the end of the tournament's qualification phase, the clubs are ordered based on their respective points obtained, which is later presented in a descending order. If at the end of the tournament's 17 matches, two or more clubs are tied on points, their position in the genera table is determined based on the following tie-breaker criteria:

1. Best difference between goals scored and received
2. Highest number of goals scored
3. Particular scorers between the tied clubs
4. Highest number of goals scored as a visitor
5. Best placed in the general quotient table
6. Fair Play Table
7. Lottery

To determine the places that will occupy the clubs that participate in the final phase of the tournament, the general classification table will be used as a base.

At the end of the 17 matches, the first 10 clubs of the general qualification table automatically participate in the run for the Liga BBVA MX Champion title.

== Final phase ==
Prior to the quarterfinal round, a new qualifying round, called "Play-In", allows clubs that are positioned 7th and 10th in the general table a chance to participate. The teams that are in 7th and 8th position will play against each other to determine a qualifier for playoffs. Meanwhile, the losing team of that series will play against the winner of the match between the 9th and 10th positioned teams, in order to determine the 8th participating team for quarterfinals.

The eight clubs qualified for quarterfinals will be repositioned, according to the place they occupied at the end of match-day 17's general table. Position number one will go to the best classified club, and so on up to number eight. The matches from this phase unfold during reciprocal visits, in the following stages:

The winning clubs in both the quarterfinal and semifinal matches will be the clubs that will mark the greatest number of goals in those two matches. If there is a tie in the number of scored goals, the club with the highest position in the qualifying general table will advance to the next round.

The corresponding matches in the reciprocal visit phase will be played on the chosen Wednesday and Saturday, or Thursday and Sunday, if applicable, exclusively in descending order, the four best-ranked clubs at the end of match-day 17's general table, on the day and time of their home game. The next four clubs can only choose the schedule.

The winning club of the final and therefore champion, will be the one that scores the greatest number of goals in the two games. If at the end of the matches' regulatory time both teams are tied, then two extra times of 15 minutes each will be added. If the tie persists in these periods, they'll then proceed to penalty shoot-out until a winner is announced.

The quarterfinal matches will be played as follows:

1st vs 8th
2nd vs 7th
3rd vs 6th
4th vs 5th

In the semifinals, the four winning clubs of the quarterfinals will participate, repositioning them from one to four, according to their best position at the end of match-day 17's general table of the corresponding tournament, facing each other:

1st vs 4th
2nd vs 3rd

The two winning clubs of the corresponding semifinal phase will compete for the Torneo de Clausura 2024, repositioning them from one to two, according to their best position at the end of matchday 17's general table of each tournament.

== Participating teams ==
=== Information of the participating teams ===
Teams	Coach	City	Stadium	Capacity	Foundation	Sponsor(s)	Kit
América	Brazil André Jardine	Mexico City	Azteca	87 000	1916 (109)	United States AT&T	United States Nike
Atlas	Spain Beñat San José	Guadalajara, Jalisco	Jalisco	56 713	1916 (110)	Mexico Grupo Caliente	Mexico Charly
Atlético de San Luis	Brazil Gustavo Leal	San Luis Potosí, San Luis Potosí	Alfonso Lastras	30 000	2013 (13)	Mexico Canel's	Mexico Sporelli
Cruz Azul	Argentina Martín Anselmi	Mexico City	Ciudad de los Deportes	34 253	1927 (99)	Mexico Cemento Cruz Azul	Mexico Pirma
Guadalajara	Argentina Fernando Gago	Zapopan, Jalisco	Akron	49 850	1906 (120)	Mexico Grupo Caliente	Germany Puma
Juárez	Brazil Maurício Barbieri	Ciudad Juárez, Chihuahua	Olímpico Benito Juárez	19 703	2015 (11)	Costa Rica Betcris	Mexico Sporelli
León	Uruguay Jorge Bava	León de los Aldama, Guanajuato	León	31 297	1943 (83)	Mexico Telcel	Mexico Charly
Mazatlán	Mexico Gilberto Adame INT	Mazatlán, Sinaloa	El Encanto	25 000	2020 (6)	Mexico Grupo Caliente	Mexico Pirma
Monterrey	Argentina Fernando Ortiz	Monterrey, Nuevo León	BBVA	53 500	1945 (81)	Mexico BBVA México	Germany Puma
Necaxa	Mexico Eduardo Fentanes	Aguascalientes, Aguascalientes	Victoria	25 994	1923 (103)	Mexico Rolcar	Mexico Pirma
Pachuca	Uruguay Guillermo Almada	Pachuca de Soto, Hidalgo	Hidalgo	30 000	1892 (133)	Mexico Cementos Fortaleza	Mexico Charly
Puebla	Argentina Andrés Carevic	Puebla, Puebla	Cuauhtémoc	51 726	1944 (82)	Mexico Grupo Caliente	Mexico Pirma
Querétaro	Argentina Mauro Gerk	Santiago de Querétaro, Querétaro	Corregidora	35 575	1950 (76)	United States Pedigree	Mexico Charly
Santos	Mexico Ignacio Ambriz	Torreón, Coahuila	Corona	30 000	1983 (43)	Mexico Soriana	Mexico Charly
Tigres UANL	Uruguay Robert Siboldi	Monterrey, Nuevo León	Universitario	41 615	1960 (66)	Mexico Cemex	Germany Adidas
Tijuana	Mexico Miguel Herrera	Tijuana, Baja California	Caliente	27 333	2007 (19)	Mexico Grupo Caliente	Mexico Charly
Toluca	Portugal Renato Paiva	Toluca, State of Mexico	Nemesio Díez	30 000	1917 (109)	Mexico Roshfrans	United States New Balance
UNAM	Argentina Gustavo Lema	Mexico City	Olímpico Universitario	72 000	1954 (72)	Germany DHL	United States Nike

- Data updated on 2024.

=== Coach changes ===
Teams	Coach (Matches)	Vacany Date	Reason for Vacany	Pos.	Incoming Coach	Appointment Date
Juárez	Mexico Diego Mejía (1 – 4)	January 30, 2024	Fired	17th.	Mexico Tomás Campos; Mexico Antonio Torres Servín INT	February 2, 2024
Juárez	Mexico Tomás Campos; Mexico Antonio Torres Servín INT (5 – 6)	February 10, 2024	End of Interim	18th.	Brazil Maurício Barbieri	February 9, 2024
Santos Laguna	Uruguay Pablo Repetto (1 – 6)	February 11, 2024	Fired	15th.	Mexico Ignacio Ambriz	February 12, 2024
Puebla	Mexico Ricardo Carbajal (1 – 9)	February 12, 2024	Fired	17th.	Venezuela Fernando Aristeguieta INT	February 29, 2024
Puebla	Venezuela Fernando Aristeguieta INT (10 – 11)	March 12, 2024	End of Interim	17th.	Argentina Andrés Carevic	March 12, 2024
Mazatlán	Spain Ismael Rescalvo (1 – 14)	April 8, 2024	Fired	15th.	Mexico Gilberto Adame INT	April 8, 2024

=== Teams by state ===
For the 2023–24 season, the federal entity of Mexican Republic with the most teams in the First Division is Mexico City with three teams. Fourteen entities will be represented in the tournament.

Clausura 2024 Teams

Federal entity	Number	Teams
Mexico City	3	América, Cruz Azul, and Pumas UNAM
Jalisco	2	Atlas and Guadalajara
Nuevo León	2	Monterrey and Tigres UANL
Aguascalientes	1	Necaxa
Baja California	1	Tijuana
Chihuahua	1	Juárez
Coahuila	1	Santos
State of Mexico	1	Toluca
Guanajuato	1	León
Hidalgo	1	Pachuca
Puebla	1	Puebla
Querétaro	1	Querétaro
San Luis Potosí	1	Atlético de San Luis
Sinaloa	1	Mazatlán

== Regular tournament ==
- The full calendar according to the official page.
- The schedules corresponding to the time of Central Mexico (UTC-6).
- The calendar was released on December 17, 2023.

Match 1
Location	Result	Visitor	Stadium	Date	Time	Spectators	Booked	Sent off (straight red)
Querétaro	2 – 2	Toluca	Corregidora	January 12	19:00	13,428	5	0
Mazatlán	0 – 1	Atlético de San Luis	El Encanto	January 12	21:00	9,510	2	0
Cruz Azul	0 – 1	Pachuca	Ciudad de los Deportes	January 13	19:00	26,100	4	0
Guadalajara	1 – 1	Santos Laguna	Akron	January 13	19:05	36,743	6	0
Monterrey	2 – 0	Puebla	BBVA	January 13	21:00	33,233	3	0
Tijuana	0 – 2	América	Caliente	January 13	21:00	29,533	3	0
Pumas UNAM	1 – 0	Juárez	Olímpico Universitario	January 14	12:00	22,057	4	1
Necaxa	2 – 1	Atlas	Victoria	January 14	18:00	13,663	4	2
León	1 – 2	Tigres UANL	León	January 17	19:00	23,531	2	0

Match 2
Location	Result	Visitor	Stadium	Date	Time	Spectators	Booked	Sent off (straight red)
Puebla	1 – 2	Necaxa	Cuauhtémoc	January 19	19:00	11,272	4	0
Atlético de San Luis	3 – 1	Pumas UNAM	Alfonso Lastras Ramírez	January 19	21:00	22,262	6	0
Juárez	0 – 0	Cruz Azul	Olímpico Benito Juárez	January 19	21:10	13,714	5	0
Toluca	4 – 1	Mazatlán	Nemesio Díez	January 20	17:00	23,387	6	0
América	2 – 0	Querétaro	Azteca	January 20	19:05	31,564	4	0
Atlas	0 – 0	Tijuana	Jalisco	January 20	21:10	16,457	2	0
Tigres UANL	1 – 0	Guadalajara	Universitario	January 21	18:00	40,283	5	0
Santos Laguna	0 – 2	Monterrey	Corona	January 21	20:05	15,177	8	0
Pachuca	3 – 2	León	Hidalgo	February 7	21:10	13,291	4	1

Match 3
Location	Result	Visitor	Stadium	Date	Time	Spectators	Booked	Sent off (straight red)
Puebla	1 – 1	Toluca	Cuauhtémoc	January 26	19:00	15,864	6	0
Tijuana	1 – 1	Guadalajara	Caliente	January 26	21:00	29,533	7	1
Cruz Azul	2 – 1	Mazatlán	Ciudad de los Deportes	January 27	17:00	20,032	4	1
León	3 – 2	Santos Laguna	León	January 27	17:00	18,271	7	1
Monterrey	3 – 1	Atlético de San Luis	BBVA	January 27	19:00	44,386	1	0
Necaxa	0 – 0	América	Victoria	January 27	21:05	20,837	5	2
Pumas UNAM	3 – 1	Pachuca	Olímpico Universitario	January 28	17:15	21,241	10	0
Atlas	2 – 1	Juárez	Jalisco	January 28	19:00	16,099	7	2
Querétaro	1 – 1	Tigres UANL	Corregidora	January 28	21:00	14,846	5	1

Match 4
Location	Result	Visitor	Stadium	Date	Time	Spectators	Booked	Sent off (straight red)
Atlético de San Luis	1 – 2	Tigres UANL	Alfonso Lastras Ramírez	January 24	19:00	20,089	3	0
Monterrey	1 – 1	Querétaro	BBVA	January 24	19:00	32,263	3	0
Juárez	0 – 2	América	Olímpico Benito Juárez	January 24	21:06	17,418	7	0
Cruz Azul	1 – 0	Tijuana	Ciudad de los Deportes	January 30	19:00	16,650	8	0
Mazatlán	2 – 2	León	El Encanto	January 30	19:00	9,150	4	0
Santos Laguna	3 – 0	Puebla	Corona	January 30	21:00	9,550	5	0
Guadalajara	3 – 2	Toluca	Akron	January 30	21:05	35,998	8	0
Pachuca	4 – 3	Atlas	Hidalgo	January 31	19:00	9,205	9	1
Pumas UNAM	2 – 2	Necaxa	Olímpico Universitario	January 31	21:00	19,261	5	3

Match 5
Location	Result	Visitor	Stadium	Date	Time	Spectators	Booked	Sent off (straight red)
Querétaro	1 – 3	Cruz Azul	Corregidora	February 2	19:00	24,777	6	0
Puebla	3 – 2	Mazatlán	Cuauhtémoc	February 2	21:00	9,499	6	1
Toluca	4 – 1	León	Nemesio Díez	February 3	17:00	25,171	3	0
Juárez	2 – 2	Necaxa	Olímpico Benito Juárez	February 3	17:06	9,197	5	0
Tigres UANL	2 – 2	Pumas UNAM	Universitario	February 3	19:05	41,036	5	0
Pachuca	3 – 2	Tijuana	Hidalgo	February 3	19:10	10,137	10	1
América	1 – 1	Monterrey	Azteca	February 3	21:10	41,158	3	1
Atlas	3 – 0	Santos Laguna	Jalisco	February 4	18:00	16,847	4	0
Atlético de San Luis	0 – 2	Guadalajara	Alfonso Lastras Ramírez	February 4	19:00	22,044	8	0

Match 6
Location	Result	Visitor	Stadium	Date	Time	Spectators	Booked	Sent off (straight red)
Mazatlán	2 – 0	Atlas	El Encanto	February 9	19:00	8,957	4	1
Tijuana	1 – 1	Querétaro	Caliente	February 9	21:10	14,333	7	0
Necaxa	3 – 3	Toluca	Victoria	February 10	17:00	15,540	4	0
Guadalajara	2 – 1	Juárez	Akron	February 10	17:05	33,831	4	1
León	0 – 1	América	León	February 10	19:00	23,304	6	1
Cruz Azul	3 – 0	Atlético de San Luis	Ciudad de los Deportes	February 10	19:05	23,826	2	0
Monterrey	3 – 2	Pachuca	BBVA	February 10	21:10	46,211	3	0
Santos Laguna	0 – 3	Tigres UANL	Corona	February 10	21:10	15,727	7	0
Pumas UNAM	3 – 0	Puebla	Olímpico Universitario	11 de febrero	12:00	17,488	2	1

Match 7
Location	Result	Visitor	Stadium	Date	Time	Spectators	Booked	Sent off (straight red)
Querétaro	1 – 1	Necaxa	Corregidora	February 16	19:00	9,590	5	1
Mazatlán	2 – 2	Guadalajara	El Encanto	February 16	21:00	17,787	3	1
Atlético de San Luis	3 – 3	Tijuana	Alfonso Lastras Ramírez	February 17	17:00	14,919	4	0
Pachuca	2 – 1	América	Hidalgo	February 17	19:00	18,143	5	0
Cruz Azul	1 – 0	Tigres UANL	Ciudad de los Deportes	February 17	21:05	25,755	6	3
Atlas	0 – 1	León	Jalisco	February 18	16:00	16,881	3	1
Pumas UNAM	3 – 0	Santos Laguna	Olímpico Universitario	February 18	18:05	22,314	5	0
Monterrey	0 – 0	Toluca	BBVA	February 18	20:10	46,189	2	0
Juárez	4 – 3	Puebla	Olímpico Benito Juárez	March 23 (Note: The match between Juárez and Puebla was originally programmed to start on February 17 at 17:00. However, La Liga decided to postpone the match in solidarity with FC Juárez, due to the passing of Diego Chávez Collins, a player of the team in February 14.)	19:00	9,169	1	0

Match 8
Location	Result	Visitor	Stadium	Date	Time	Spectators	Booked	Sent off (straight red)
Puebla	0 – 2	Querétaro	Cuauhtémoc	February 23	19:00	9,480	4	0
Necaxa	1 – 1	Pachuca	Victoria	February 23	21:00	17,941	5	2
Juárez	0 – 3	Monterrey	Olímpico Benito Juárez	February 23	21:10	10,979	3	0
León	1 – 0	Atlético de San Luis	León	February 24	17:00	20,780	2	1
Tigres UANL	1 – 1	Atlas	Universitario	February 24	19:00	39,762	4	0
Guadalajara	3 – 1	Pumas UNAM	Akron	February 24	19:05	34,574	1	0
América	1 – 0	Cruz Azul	Azteca	February 24	21:10	59,032	3	0
Toluca	2 – 0	Tijuana	Nemesio Díez	February 25	12:00	21,297	4	0
Santos Laguna	1 – 0	Mazatlán	Corona	February 25	18:00	15,012	4	0

Match 9
Location	Result	Visitor	Stadium	Date	Time	Spectators	Booked	Sent off (straight red)
Atlas	0 – 0	Pumas UNAM	Jalisco	February 14	21:00	16,344	2	1
Puebla	1 – 4	Pachuca	Cuauhtémoc	February 20	19:00	10,863	7	0
Necaxa	1 – 0	Guadalajara	Victoria	February 20	21:00	20,786	7	0
Toluca	1 – 0	Santos Laguna	Nemesio Díez	February 21	19:00	22,999	5	1
León	2 – 3	Cruz Azul	León	February 21	21:00	24,618	5	0
América	2 – 2	Mazatlán	Azteca	February 21	21:00	18,199	4	0
Querétaro	4 – 1	Atlético de San Luis	Corregidora	27 de febrero	19:00	8,784	7	0
Tigres UANL	1 – 0	Juárez	Universitario	February 28	19:00	34,731	4	0
Tijuana	1 – 1	Monterrey	Caliente	February 28	21:00	18,333	7	0

Match 10
Location	Result	Visitor	Stadium	Date	Time	Spectators	Booked	Sent off (straight red)
Querétaro	0 – 1	Santos Laguna	Corregidora	March 1	19:00	12,004	9	0
Atlético de San Luis	4 – 0	Puebla	Alfonso Lastras Ramírez	March 1	19:00	12,581	2	1
Mazatlán	2 – 1	Necaxa	El Encanto	March 1	21:10	11,480	5	2
Toluca	2 – 1	Tigres UANL	Nemesio Díez	March 2	17:00	27,273	5	1
Pachuca	3 – 2	Juárez	Hidalgo	March 2	19:00	17,896	7	0
Cruz Azul	3 – 0	Guadalajara	Azteca (Note: El partido entre Cruz Azul y Guadalajara fue cambiado al Estadio Azteca por cuestiones de logística debido a un concierto de Alejandro Fernández en la Monumental Plaza de Toros México, aledaña al Estadio Ciudad de los Deportes.)	March 2	19:05	67,623	2	0
Atlas	1 – 5	América	Jalisco	March 2	21:10	40,694	2	1
Monterrey	3 – 0	Pumas UNAM	BBVA	March 3	19:00	47,090	2	0
Tijuana	1 – 1	León	Caliente	March 3	21:00	17,333	5	0

Match 11
Location	Result	Visitor	Stadium	Date	Time	Spectators	Booked	Sent off (straight red)
Puebla	2 – 2	Atlas	Cuauhtémoc	March 8	19:00	10,051	3	0
Necaxa	3 – 1	Atlético de San Luis	Victoria	March 8	21:00	14,935	6	1
Juárez	1 – 1	Toluca	Olímpico Benito Juárez	March 8	21:10	11,623	0	0
Guadalajara	1 – 2	León	Akron	March 9	17:05	33,541	5	1
Pachuca	1 – 2	Querétaro	Hidalgo	March 9	19:00	18,971	7	0
Santos Laguna	3 – 0	Cruz Azul	Corona	March 9	19:00	22,007	8	2
América	2 – 0	Tigres UANL	Azteca	March 9	21:00	45,063	2	0
Pumas UNAM	3 – 3	Tijuana	Olímpico Universitario	March 10	12:00	18,064	6	2
Monterrey	2 – 1	Mazatlán	BBVA	March 10	19:00	42,085	4	0

Match 12
Location	Result	Visitor	Stadium	Date	Time	Spectators	Booked	Sent off (straight red)
Querétaro	1 – 0	Juárez	Corregidora	March 15	19:00	9,603	4	1
Tijuana	2 – 2	Santos Laguna	Caliente	March 15	21:00	20,333	4	0
Cruz Azul	1 – 2	Necaxa	Ciudad de los Deportes	March 16	17:00	25,580	6	0
León	2 – 1	Puebla	León	March 16	19:00	22,994	6	0
Tigres UANL	5 – 1	Mazatlán	Universitario	March 16	19:00	37,321	1	0
Guadalajara	0 – 0	América	Akron	March 16	21:05	42,650	6	0
Atlas	1 – 2	Monterrey	Jalisco	March 17	17:00	16,458	4	1
Atlético de San Luis	2 – 1	Pachuca	Alfonso Lastras Ramírez	March 17	19:00	15,634	7	0
Toluca	3 – 0	Pumas UNAM	Nemesio Díez	March 17	19:00	27,273	4	0

Match 13
Location	Result	Visitor	Stadium	Date	Time	Spectators	Booked	Sent off (straight red)
Puebla	2 – 3	Tigres UANL	Cuauhtémoc	March 29	19:00	16,618	2	0
América	2 – 1	Atlético de San Luis	Azteca	March 29	20:00	34,476	2	0
Mazatlán	2 – 0	Tijuana	El Encanto	March 29	21:00	11,218	4	0
Pachuca	2 – 3	Toluca	Hidalgo	March 30	19:00	20,059	8	1
Monterrey	0 – 2	Guadalajara	BBVA	March 30	19:00	46,165	1	2
Pumas UNAM	0 – 0	Cruz Azul	Olímpico Universitario	March 30	21:05	41,121	4	0
Atlas	2 – 3	Querétaro	Jalisco	March 31	17:00	13,379	5	1
Necaxa	1 – 2	León	Victoria	March 31	19:00	19, 574	2	0
Juárez	2 – 1	Santos Laguna	Olímpico Benito Juárez	March 31	19:36	13,088	3	0

Match 14
Location	Result	Visitor	Stadium	Date	Time	Spectators	Booked	Sent off (straight red)
Mazatlán	0 – 4	Pumas UNAM	El Encanto	April 5	19:00	12,620	7	0
Tijuana	2 – 3	Necaxa	Caliente	April 5	21:10	15,333	6	0
León	0 – 2	Querétaro	León	April 6	17:00	22,435	0	0
Tigres UANL	0 – 3	Pachuca	Universitario	April 6	19:00	38,147	5	0
Guadalajara	3 – 2	Puebla	Akron	April 6	19:05	35,980	4	0
Cruz Azul	2 – 1	Monterrey	Ciudad de los Deportes	April 6	21:05	13,585	6	0
Santos Laguna	1 – 1	América	Corona	April 6	21:05	28,596	5	0
Toluca	4 – 1	Atlas	Nemesio Díez	April 7	12:00	27,273	4	0
Atlético de San Luis	2 – 3	Juárez	Alfonso Lastras Ramírez	8 de abril (Note: The match between Atlético de San Luis and Juárez was ongoing on April 7 at 18:00 until the 73rd minute with the tied score of 2-2, when the match had to be suspended due to lighting failures in the Estadio Alfonso Lastras Ramírez. The league decided that it would resume the next day, April 8, at 9:30)	9:30	13,923	5	0

Match 15
Location	Result	Visitor	Stadium	Date	Time	Spectators	Booked	width="10" | (red card)
Querétaro	0 – 2	Mazatlán	Corregidora	April 12	19:06	13,685	4	1
Necaxa	2 – 0	Santos Laguna	Victoria	April 12	21:00	15,292	2	0
Puebla	0 – 1	Cruz Azul	Cuauhtémoc	April 12	21:00	31,289	5	0
Pachuca	0 – 1	Guadalajara	Hidalgo	April 13	17:00	20,804	9	1
América	5 – 1	Toluca	Azteca	April 13	19:05	65,644	6	0
Monterrey	3 – 3	Tigres UANL	BBVA	April 13	21:10	51,348	6	2
Atlas	2 – 1	Atlético de San Luis	Jalisco	April 14	18:00	10, 750	0	1
Pumas UNAM	1 – 0	León	Olímpico Universitario	April 14	18:00	23,127	2	1
Juárez	0 – 1	Tijuana	Olímpico Benito Juárez	April 14	20:06	10,076	2	0

Match 16
Location	Result	Visitor	Stadium	Date	Time	Spectators	Booked	Sent off (straight red)
Mazatlán	0 – 2	Juárez	El Encanto	April 19	19:00	9,894	0	1
Atlético de San Luis	1 – 5	Toluca	Alfonso Lastras Ramírez	April 19	21:00	15,989	5	0
Tijuana	3 – 1	Puebla	Caliente	April 19	21:10	18,333	5	1
León	2 – 0	Monterrey	León	April 20	17:00	27,032	3	0
Tigres UANL	5 – 2	Necaxa	Universitario	April 20	19:05	40,352	5	0
Guadalajara	2 – 0	Querétaro	Akron	April 20	19:05	37,040	7	0
Santos Laguna	0 – 2	Pachuca	Corona	April 20	19:05	10,309	4	0
Pumas UNAM	2 – 1	América	Olímpico Universitario	April 20	21:10	44,670	10	1
Cruz Azul	2 – 2	Atlas	Ciudad de los Deportes	April 21	18:00	20,543	3	0

Match 17
Location	Result	Visitor	Stadium	Date	Time	Spectators	Booked	Sent off (straight red)
Puebla		América	Cuauhtémoc	April 26	19:00			
Querétaro		Pumas UNAM	Corregidora	April 26	21:00			
Juárez		León	Olímpico Benito Juárez	April 27	17:06			
Tigres UANL		Tijuana	Universitario	April 27	19:00			
Pachuca		Mazatlán	Hidalgo	April 27	19:00			
Toluca		Cruz Azul	Nemesio Díez	April 27	19:00			
Atlas		Guadalajara	Jalisco	April 27	21:00			
Necaxa		Monterrey	Victoria	April 28	18:00			
Santos Laguna		Atlético de San Luis	Corona	April 28	18:00			

== General table ==
Pos	Team	Pld	W	D	L	GF	GA	GD	Pts

Updated to match(es) played on unknown. Source: official page

=== Qualification evolution ===
. Updated Date: 2024

Team	1	2	3	4	5	6	7	8	9	10	11	12	13	14	15	16	17
América	1	1	2+	2	2	2	5	4+	4	4	2	2	1	2	1	1
Toluca	9	6	7	9	7	9	9	5+	6	5	5	3	3	1	2	2
Cruz Azul	14	11	9	6	4	4	1	1+	2	2	3	4	5	4	4	3
Monterrey	2	2	1+	1	1	1	3	3	1	1	1	1	2	3	3	4
Tigres UANL	3	5	3+	3	3	3	6	7+	5	6	7	6	4	7	7	5
Pachuca	6	7*	11*	7*	6*	5	4	2+	3	3	4	5	6	5	6	6
Guadalajara	10	10	13	10	8	7	7	8+	8	9	9	10	10	9	8	7
Necaxa	4	4	4	4	5	8	8	9+	9	8	6	7	7	6	5	8
Pumas UNAM	7	8	5	5	9	6	2+	6+	7	7	8	11	11	10	9	9
Querétaro	8	13	12+	14	15	13	14	12	10	10	10	8	8	8	10	10
León	13	16*	10*	12*	12*	14	11	10+	11	11	11	9	9	11	11	11
Juárez	15	12	17+	16	17	18	18*	18*	18*	18*	18*	18*	16	14	16	12
Santos Laguna	11	14	15	11	13	15	17	14+	14	13	12	12	12	12	12	13
Mazatlán	16	18	18	17	18	12	13	15+	15	14	15	15	14	15	13	14
Tijuana	18	15	14	15	16	17	15	16	16	16	16	16	17	17	17	15
Atlas	12	9	8	13	10	10	10+	11+	12	15	13	14	15	16	15	16
Atlético San Luis	5	3	6+	8	11	11	12	13	13	12	14	13	13	13	14	17
Puebla	17	17	16	18	14	16	16*	17	17*	17*	17*	17*	18	18	18	18	18

- (*) Indicates the position of the team with a match pending.
- (+) Indicates the position of the team with one game ahead.

== Quotient table ==
Starting with the 2020–21 season, promotion and relegation between the Liga MX and the Liga de Expansión MX was suspended, however, the quotient table is used to establish the payments of the fines that will be allocated to the development of the silver circuit clubs. According to the Article 24 on the competition regulations, the payment of $MXN 160 million will be distributed among the last three positioned in the table as follows: 80 million for the last place, 47 million for the penultimate, and 33 million will be paid for the second-to-last place team. The team that ends in last place in the table will start the following season with a zerio ratio.

Update date: 2024

Position	Team	Apertura Tournament 2021	Clausura Tournament 2022	Apertura Tournament 2022	Clausura Tournament 2023	Apertura Tournament 2023	Clausura Tournament 2024	Points	A21	C22	A22	C23	A23	C24	Matches	DG	Quotient
1	América	35	26	38	34	40	32	205	17	17	17	17	17	16	101	94	2.0297
2	Monterrey	22	26	35	40	33	29	185	17	17	17	17	17	16	101	66	1.8317
3	Tigres UANL	28	33	30	25	30	28	174	17	17	17	17	17	16	101	57	1.7228
4	Pachuca	18	38	32	31	22	28	169	17	17	17	17	17	16	101	30	1.6733
5	Guadalajara	22	26	22	34	27	28	159	17	17	17	17	17	16	101	22	1.5743
6	Toluca	24	19	27	32	21	32	155	17	17	17	17	17	16	101	24	1.5347
7	León	29	21	22	30	23	23	148	17	17	17	17	17	15	101	6	1.4653
8	Cruz Azul	23	25	24	24	17	30	143	17	17	17	17	17	16	101	-2	1.4158
9	Santos	24	20	33	19	23	15	134	17	17	17	17	17	16	101	-3	1.3267
10	Pumas UNAM	21	22	14	18	28	26	129	17	17	17	17	17	16	101	-7	1.2772
11	Querétaro (Note: Having ended in last place of the table last season 2022-2023, Querétaro Fútbol Club ibegan the 2023-2024 season at zero in the numbers related to said table.)					19	23	42					17	16	33	-10	1.2727
12	Puebla	24	26	22	20	25	5	122	17	17	17	17	17	16	101	-23	1.2079
13	Atlas	29	27	13	21	17	14	121	17	17	17	17	17	16	101	-8	1.1980
14	Necaxa	20	23	19	14	15	27	118	17	17	17	17	17	16	101	-26	1.1683
15	Atlético de San Luis	20	23	18	19	23	13	116	17	17	17	17	17	16	101	-26	1.1485
16	Mazatlán	20	21	17	7	22	15	102	17	17	17	17	17	16	101	-52	1.0099
17	Juárez (Note: Having ended in last place of the table 2021-2022, the Football Club Juárez started the 2022-2023 season with zero in said table.)			19	15	18	15	67			17	17	17	16	67	-26	1.0000
18	Tijuana	15	17	17	16	20	14	99	17	17	17	17	17	16	101	-54	0.9802

Fine payment $MXN 33 million.
Fine payment $MXN 47 million.
Fine payment $MXN 80 million.

== Statistics ==
=== Fair play qualification ===
- Data according to official page.
- Date Updated: 2024

Place	Club	Booked	Booked	Sent off (straight red)	Points
1	Monterrey	24	0	3	33
2	Mazatlán	27	0	2	33
3	Toluca	35	0	0	35
4	América	30	0	2	36
5	Juárez	36	0	0	36
6	Atlético de San Luis	31	1	1	37
7	Cruz Azul	35	1	1	41
8	Santos Laguna	33	1	2	42
9	León	27	0	6	45
10	Tijuana	45	0	0	45
11	Tigres UANL	32	0	5	47
12	Puebla	36	0	4	48
13	Guadalajara	43	1	2	52
14	Atlas	32	2	6	56
15	Pumas UNAM	43	0	5	58
16	Pachuca	47	1	3	59
17	Querétaro	47	3	1	59
18	Necaxa	41	2	5	62
First Yellow Card		1 point
(yellow card) Second Yellow Card and Expulsion		3 points
(red card) Direct Red Card		3 points

=== Top scorers ===
List of top scorers of the tournament.

- Data according to official page.

Updated Date: 2024

Position Number	Player	Club	Goals	Matches.	Average	Minutes	M/G
1º	Mexico Uriel Antuna	Cruz Azul	8	16	0.5	1373	171.63
=	Venezuela Salomón Rondón	Pachuca	8	16	0.5	1257	157.13
=	Uruguay Federico Viñas	León	8	16	0.5	1368	171
4º	Colombia Diber Cambindo	Necaxa	7	13	0.54	967	138.14
=	Paraguay Luis Amarilla	Mazatlán	7	16	0.44	1178	168.29
6º	(Mexico) Julián Quiñones	América	4	13	0.31	828	138
=	Argentina Juan Brunetta	Tigres UANL	6	15	0.4	1048	174.67
=	Mexico Víctor Guzmán	Guadalajara	6	13	0.46	885	147.5
=	Mexico Guillermo Martínez	Pumas UNAM	6	15	0.4	1124	187.33
=	Colombia Christian Rivera	Tijuana	6	14	0.43	1260	210

==== Triplets or more ====
Player	Location	Result	Visitor	Goals	Date	Match
Colombia Christian Rivera	Pumas UNAM	3 – 3	Tijuana	(28 p) (53 p) (75 p)	March 10, 2024	Jornada 11
Mexico Marcelo Flores	Tigres UANL	5 – 2	Necaxa	58' 62' 68'	April 20, 2024	Jornada 16

=== Maximum attendance ===
- Data according to SoccerWay.

Updated Date: 4

Position Number	Player	Club	Attendance	Matches.	Average	Minutes	M/A
1º	Morocco Oussama Idrissi	Pachuca	7	14	0.5	1108	158.29
=	Mexico César Huerta	Pumas UNAM	7	13	0.54	1015	145
3º	Mexico Roberto Alvarado	Guadalajara	5	15	0.33	1327	265.4
=	Mexico Pablo Barrera	Querétaro	5	15	0.33	1254	250.8
=	Chile Jean Meneses	Toluca	5	15	0.33	1102	220.4
=	Mexico Ricardo Monreal	Necaxa	5	14	0.36	853	170.6
7º	Mexico Brian García	Toluca	4	15	0.27	1208	302
=	Argentina Nicolás Ibáñez	Tigres UANL	4	14	0.29	810	202.5
=	Mexico Carlos Orrantía	Toluca	4	13	0.31	684	171
=	Argentina Eduardo Salvio	Pumas UNAM	4	15	0.27	1205	301.25

=== Attendance ===
List with the attendance of the matches and teams Liga BBVA MX.
Data updated as of 4

==== By team ====
In average, only the parties that had public assistance are counted.

Position	Team	Total	Half	Highest	Lowest	Average Occupation %
1	Monterrey	388,970	43,219	51,348	32,263	84.17%
2	América	295,136	42,162	65,644	18,199	52.01%
3	Tigres UANL	271,632	38,805	41,036	34,731	92.64%
4	Guadalajara	290,357	36,295	42,650	33,541	78.51%
5	Cruz Azul	239,694	26,633	67,623	13,585	67.50% (Note: The percentage of attendance during Cruz Azul matches seems affected, due to the disruption of the match in the Estadio Azteca.)
6	Pumas UNAM	229,343	25,483	44,670	17,488	43.60%
7	Toluca	174,673	24,953	27,273	21,297	91.49%
8	León	182,965	22,871	27,032	18,271	73.08%
9	Tijuana	163,064	20,383	29,533	14,333	69.02%
10	Atlas	163,909	18,212	40,694	10,750	33.10%
11	Necaxa	138,568	17,321	20,837	13,663	72.62%
12	Atlético de San Luis	137,441	17,180	22,262	12,581	60.43%
13	Santos	116,378	16,625	28,596	9,550	57.13%
14	Pachuca	128,506	16,063	20,804	9,205	61.97%
15	Puebla	114,936	14,367	31,289	9,480	30.12%
16	Querétaro	106,717	13,340	24,777	8,784	39.08%
17	Juárez	95,264	11,908	17,418	9,169	60.44%
18	Mazatlán	90,616	11,327	17,787	8,957	56.09%
Tournament Total		3,328,169	23,112	67,623	8,784	58.65%

==== Per match ====
The list excludes matches that were played behind closed doors.

Attendance per Matches
Match	Total Attendance	Average	% of Occupation	Highest match Attendance	Lowest Match Attendance
1	207,798	23,089	63.11%	Guadalajara vs Santos Laguna (36,743)	Mazatlán vs Atlético de San Luis (9,510)
2	187,407	20,823	52.63%	Tigres UANL vs Guadalajara (40,283)	Puebla vs Necaxa (11,272)
3	201,109	22,345	55.01%	Monterrey vs Atlético de San Luis (44,386)	Querétaro vs Tigres UANL (14,846)
4	169,584	18,843	54.07%	Guadalajara vs Toluca (35,998)	Mazatlán vs León (9,150)
5	199,866	22,207	55.34%	América vs Monterrey (41,158)	Juárez vs Necaxa (9,197)
6	199,217	22,135	61.44%	Monterrey vs Pachuca (46,211)	Mazatlán vs Atlas (8,957)
7	180,747	20,083	55.20%	Monterrey vs Toluca (46,189)	Juárez vs Puebla (9,169)
8	228,857	25,429	65.74%	América vs Cruz Azul (59,032)	Puebla vs Querétaro (9,480)
9	175,657	19,517	47.25%	Tigres UANL vs Juárez (34,731)	Querétaro vs Atlético de San Luis (8,784)
10	253,974	28,219	71.96%	Cruz Azul vs Guadalajara (67,623)	Mazatlán vs Necaxa (11,480)
11	216,340	24,038	56.43%	América vs Tigres UANL (45,063)	Puebla vs Atlas (10,051)
12	217,846	24,205	66.41%	Guadalajara vs América (42,650)	Querétaro vs Juárez (9,603)
13	215,698	23,966	56.28%	Monterrey vs Guadalajara (46,165)	Mazatlán vs Tijuana (11,218)
14	207,892	23,099	72.13%	Tigres UANL vs Pachuca (38,147)	Mazatlán vs Pumas UNAM (12,620)
15	242,015	26,891	60.93%	América vs Toluca (65,644)	Juárez vs Tijuana (10,076)
rowspan="1" align="center" | 16	224,162	24,907	70.19%	Pumas UNAM vs América (44,670)	Mazatlán vs Juárez (9,894)
17
Total	3,328,169	23,112	58.65%	Cruz Azul vs Guadalajara (67,623)	Querétaro vs Atlético de San Luis (8,784)

== See also ==
- Liga BBVA MX
- 2023-24 Liga de Expansión MX season
- 2023-24 Liga MX Femenil season
