= List of Mexican billionaires by net worth =

The following is a Forbes list of Mexican billionaires is based on an annual assessment of wealth and assets compiled and published by Forbes magazine, last updated in August 2026.

== Mexican Rich List 2026 ==
1. Carlos Slim - US$125 billion - Inbursa, América Móvil and Grupo Carso
2. Germán Larrea Mota-Velasco - US$67.1 billion - Grupo México
3. Alejandro Baillères - US$19.5 billion - Grupo BAL
4. María Asunción Aramburuzabala - US$9.3 billion - Grupo Modelo
5. Carlos Hank Rhon - US$4.6 billion - Banorte
6. Fernando Chico Pardo - US$3.8 billion - Grupo Aeroportuario del Sureste
7. Ricardo Salinas Pliego - US$3.7 billion - Grupo Salinas
8. Antonio del Valle Ruiz - US$3.6 billion - Orbia
9. Rufino Vigil González - US$3.1 billion - Industrias CH
10. David Peñaloza Alanís - US$2.7 billion - Grupo Tribasa
11. Enrique Coppel Luken - US$2.4 billion - Coppel
12. Cynthia Helena Grossman Fleishman - US$2.2 billion - Arca Continental
13. Manuel Arango Arias - US$2.1 billion - Walmart de México y Centroamérica
14. Roberto Hernández Ramirez US$2.1 billion - Banamex
15. Juan Domingo Beckmann - US$2.0 billion - José Cuervo
