= Fresnillo plc =

UK precious metals mining company based in Mexico

- Type: Public limited company
- Traded as: LSE: FRES; FTSE 100 Component
- Industry: Mining
- Founded: 2008; 18 years ago
- Headquarters: London, United Kingdom (registered office); Mexico City, Mexico (corporate headquarters)
- Key people: Alberto Baillères (Chairperson); Octavio Alvídrez (CEO)
- Products: Precious metals
- Revenue: ▲US$4,561.2 million (2025)
- Operating income: ▲US$2,292.5 million (2025)
- Net income: ▲US$1,573.8 million (2025)
- Parent: Industrias Peñoles
- Website: www.fresnilloplc.com

Fresnillo plc is a Mexican precious metals mining company incorporated in the United Kingdom and headquartered in Mexico City. Fresnillo is the world's largest producer of silver from ore (primary silver) and Mexico's second-largest gold miner. It is listed on the London Stock Exchange and is a constituent of the FTSE 100 Index.

== History ==
Formerly a wholly owned operating division of Industrias Peñoles, a minority stake in the company was spun off on the London Stock Exchange in a May 2008 IPO, with a secondary listing on the Mexican Stock Exchange on the same day.

On 15 August 2012, Octavio Alvídrez took over as chief executive from Jaime Lomelín, following a handover period.

== Operations ==
The company operates three gold and silver mines in Mexico (Industrias Peñoles retained the rights to its primary base metals mines when Fresnillo was spun off). The largest mine, in terms of silver output, is Mina Proaño (also known as Fresnillo Mine), located near the city of Fresnillo in the state of Zacatecas; the other mines are at Cienega, in Durango, and Herradura, in Sonora. In 2007, Fresnillo plc produced 34.3 million ounces of silver and 279,614 ounces of gold from its three active mines, as well as around 20 tons each of zinc and lead as by-products.

The company also has 21 active exploration projects located across the country. It signalled plans to use the money raised in its IPO to expand into Peru and Chile.
