= Guerrero Gold Belt =

Region in Mexico

Guerrero Gold Belt is a region in Mexico with gold mineralization in the southern State of Guerrero that extends over 35 kilometers north of Acapulco. Located in an area consisting of several multimillion ounce gold deposits related to Fe-Au skarns, the area is known for its historic small mining operations dating back to 1924.

== Companies with interests in the area ==
=== Current ===
- Minaurum Gold Inc.
- Cayden Resources Inc.
- Citation Resources Inc.
- Newstrike Capital
- Oroco Resource Corp.
- Torex Gold Resources Inc. (formerly Gleichen Resources Ltd)
- Telson Mining Corporation

=== Past ===
- Aurea Mining Inc.
- Goldcorp Inc.
- Industrias Peñoles
- Miranda Mining Corporation (formerly Minera Nukay)
- Newmont Mining Corporation
- Teck Resources (formerly Teck-Cominco Limited)
