= Alberto Baillères =

Mexican businessman (1931–2022)

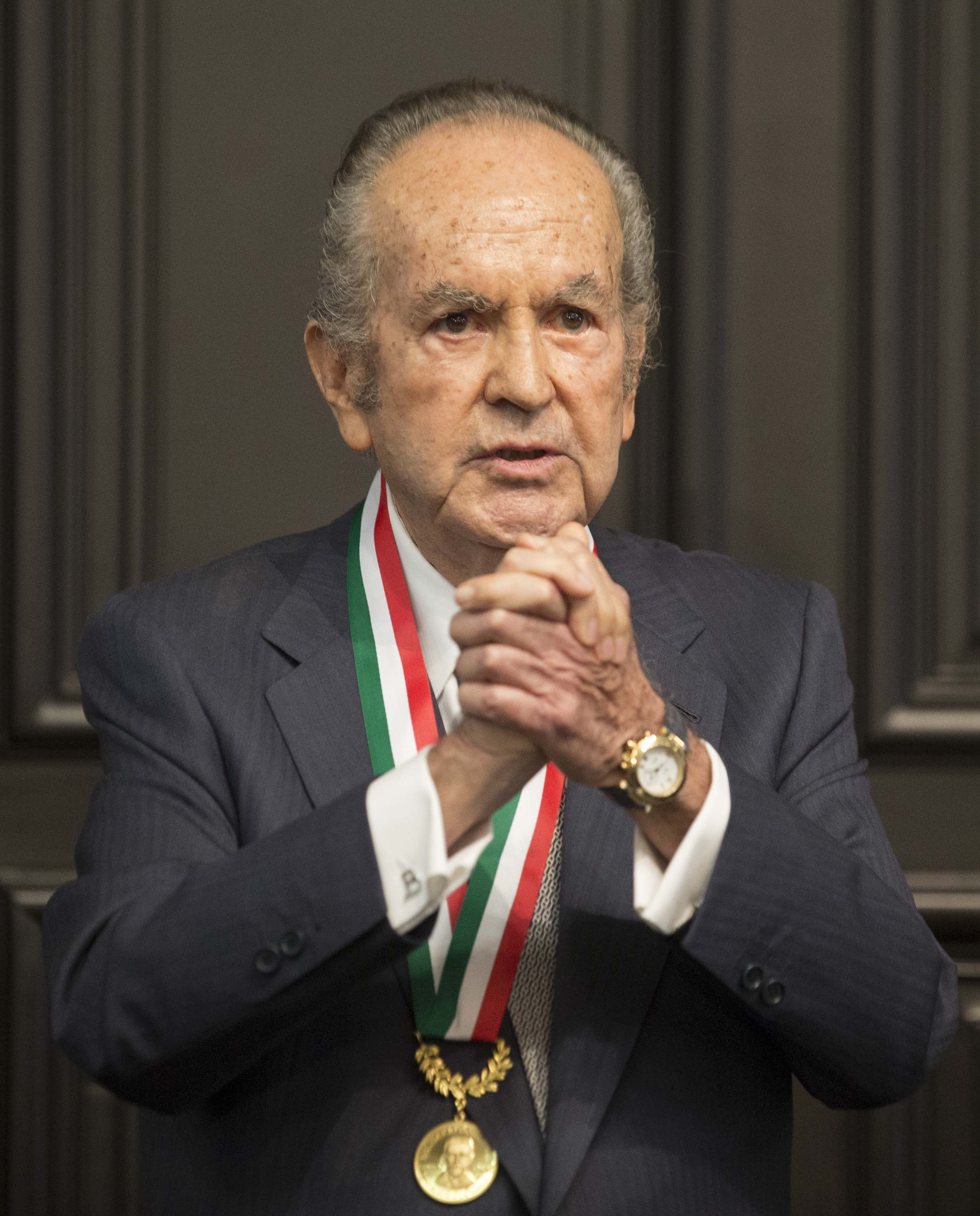
- Baillères was the recipient of the 2015 Medalla de Honor Belisario Domínguez
- Born: Alberto Baillères González; 22 August 1931; Mexico City, Mexico
- Died: 2 February 2022 (aged 90); Mexico City, Mexico
- Education: Culver Military Academy; Instituto Tecnológico Autónomo de México (ITAM)
- Occupations: Owner, Peñoles and El Palacio de Hierro
- Spouse: Teresa Baillères
- Children: 7, including Alejandro Baillères
- Parent: Raúl Baillères

Alberto Baillères González (22 August 1931 – 2 February 2022) was a Mexican billionaire businessman. As of 2021, he had an estimated net worth of US$10.1 billion according to Forbes. He was the chairman of Grupo BAL, and of ITAM.

== Early life ==
Baillères was born in Mexico City on 22 August 1931, as the son of Raúl Baillères. Baillères attended Culver Military Academy, in Culver, Indiana, US. In 1953 he received a bachelor's degree in economics from the Instituto Tecnológico Autónomo de México (ITAM, a school founded by his father), in Mexico City.

== Career ==
He took over as head of Grupo BAL aged 28, following the death of his father.

Baillères owned Grupo BAL, which controls a large number of other companies including Industrias Peñoles / Peñoles, the second most important Mexican mining company and the world's largest silver producer, El Palacio de Hierro, a chain of department stores mainly located in Mexico City, Grupo Nacional Provincial, the largest insurance company in Mexico, Grupo Profuturo, a pensions and annuities business. He sat on the board of directors of Fresnillo plc.

He was also a head member of the board of ITAM, one of Mexico's top higher education centers and thinktank, and owner of other businesses related with financial services, agriculture and bullfighting. He was the owner of the 92m yacht Mayan Queen IV.

In October 2012, Bloomberg listed Baillères as the 35th richest person in the world with an estimated net worth of US $19.3 billion.

== Belisario Domínguez Medal of Honor ==
The Senate of the Republic awarded Baillères the Belisario Domínguez Medal of Honor, Mexico's highest honor, on November 12, 2015.

== Personal life and death ==
Baillères was married to Teresa Gual, they had seven children, and lived in Mexico City.

He died on 2 February 2022, at the age of 90.

== See also ==
- List of Mexican billionaires
