= Federico Viñas =

Uruguayan footballer (born 1998)

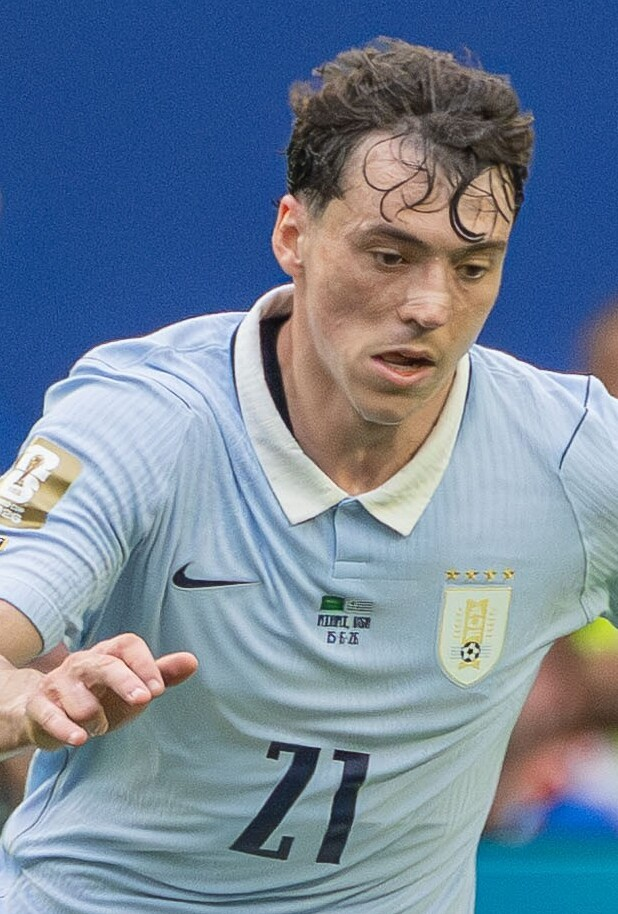
- Viñas playing for Uruguay in 2026

Personal information
- Full name: Federico Sebastián Viñas Barboza
- Date of birth: 30 June 1998 (age 28)
- Place of birth: Montevideo, Uruguay
- Height: 1.81 m (5 ft 11 in)
- Position: Forward

Team information
- Current team: Toluca
- Number: 16

Senior career*
| Years | Team | Apps | (Gls) |
| 2018–2020 | Juventud | 40 | (11) |
| 2019–2020 | → Club América (loan) | 15 | (8) |
| 2020–2023 | Club América | 95 | (13) |
| 2023–2026 | León | 33 | (16) |
| 2024–2026 | → Oviedo (loan) | 62 | (16) |
| 2026– | Toluca | 12 | (8) |

International career^{‡}
| 2020 | Uruguay U23 | 10 | (1) |
| 2023– | Uruguay | 18 | (3) |
- * Club domestic league appearances and goals as of 21 October 2026 ‡ National team caps and goals as of 18 November 2026

Federico Sebastián Viñas Barboza (born 30 June 1998) is a Uruguayan professional footballer who plays as a forward for Liga MX club Toluca and the Uruguay national team.

== Club career ==
=== Juventud de Las Piedras ===
After pursuing a pro career as a young boy, Viñas initially ceased his professional aspirations during his teenage years and began delivering meat to make a living. In 2017, he returned to the sport, beginning his career with Juventud in his native Uruguay.

==== Loan to Club América ====
On 29 August 2019, Viñas joined Mexican side Club América on a one-year loan agreement with the option for a permanent deal. He made his Liga MX debut on 14 September against Universidad Nacional. He entered the match as a 77th minute substitute and scored 28 seconds later to break the scoreless deadlock. Viñas appeared in eleven matches during the Apertura tournament, managing to score five goals, three of which were scored in the championship stage; he scored one goal against Tigres UANL in the second leg of the quarterfinals, against Monarcas Morelia in the second leg of the semifinals, and once more in the second leg of the championship match against Monterrey at the Estadio Azteca.

=== Club América ===
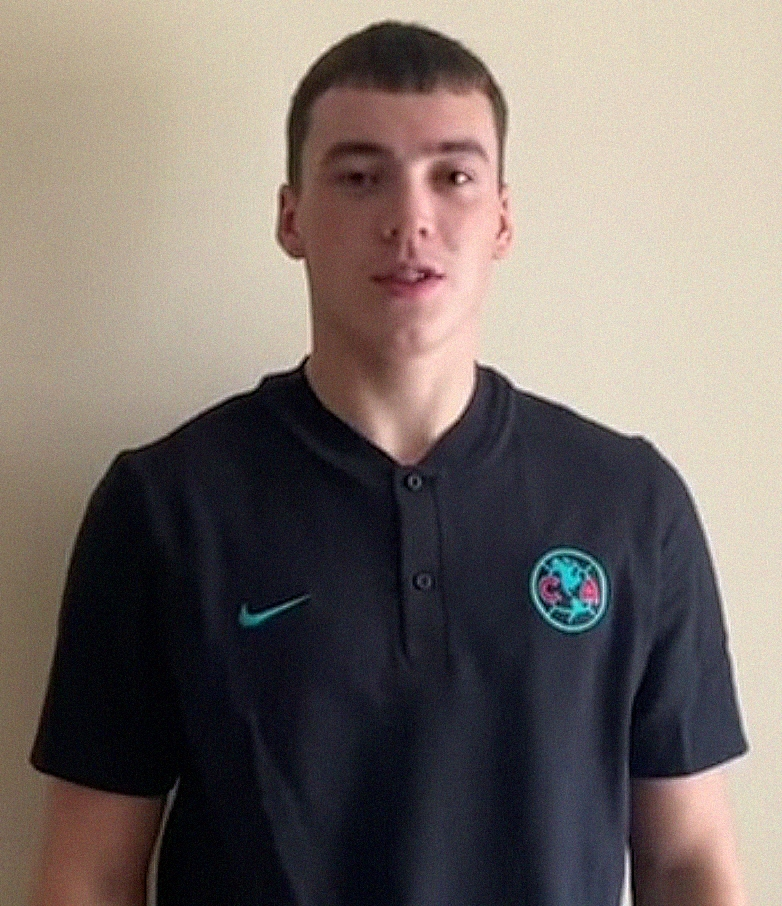
Viñas with Club América in 2020

On 30 May 2020, it was announced that America had exercised their $1.9 million option to sign Viñas on a five-year contract, with the loan move becoming permanent on 1 July. After falling out of favor with the team during the 2022–23 season, making just four league starts over the course of the campaign, Viñas began attracting interest from clubs across the country.

=== León ===
In June 2023, Viñas completed a $2 million move to Club León, signing a four-year deal. He enjoyed a resurgent season with his new club, scoring 16 goals in 33 league appearances, becoming joint-top scorer in the 2024 Clausura tournament, and earning the league's Player of the Month award for November 2023.

In May 2024, Viñas ruptured his achilles while on international duty with Uruguay, which required surgery to repair.

==== Loan to Oviedo ====
In August 2024, Viñas joined Spanish Segunda División side Real Oviedo on a one-year loan.

=== Toluca ===
In July 2026, Toluca announced the signing of Viñas on a four-year contract.

== International career ==
=== Youth ===
Viñas was included in Uruguay's U23 squad for the 2020 CONMEBOL Pre-Olympic Tournament. On 25 January 2020, Viñas scored his first goal with his national team in a 3–2 defeat against Bolivia U23.

=== Senior ===
Viñas played his first game for Uruguay in the CONMEBOL qualifiers coming in as a late substitute for Darwin Nuñez, in their victory over Argentina on 16 November 2023. On 31 May 2026, he was named in Uruguay's 26-man squad for the 2026 FIFA World Cup.

== Career statistics ==
=== Club ===
As of 31 March 2024

| Club | Season | League | | | Cup | | Continental | | Other | | Total | |
| Club | Season | Division | Apps | Goals | Apps | Goals | Apps | Goals | Apps | Goals | Apps | Goals |
|---|---|---|---|---|---|---|---|---|---|---|---|---|
| Juventud | 2018 | Segunda División | 20 | 6 | — | | — | | — | | 20 | 6 |
| Juventud | 2019 | Primera División | 20 | 5 | — | | — | | — | | 20 | 5 |
| Juventud | Total | | 40 | 11 | — | | — | | — | | 40 | 11 |
| América (loan) | 2019–20 | Liga MX | 15 | 8 | — | | 5 (Note: Appearances in CONCACAF Champions League) | 0 | — | | 20 | 8 |
| América | 2020–21 | Liga MX | 33 | 7 | — | | 5 | 3 | — | | 38 | 10 |
| América | 2021–22 | Liga MX | 30 | 2 | — | | — | | — | | 30 | 2 |
| América | 2022–23 | Liga MX | 32 | 4 | — | | — | | — | | 32 | 4 |
| América | Total | | 95 | 13 | — | | 5 | 3 | — | | 100 | 16 |
| León | 2023–24 | Liga MX | 33 | 16 | — | | — | | 3 (Note: Two appearances in Leagues Cup, one appearance in FIFA Club World Cup) | 0 | 36 | 16 |
| Career total | | | 183 | 48 | 0 | 0 | 10 | 3 | 3 | 0 | 196 | 51 |

=== International ===
As of match played 17 November 2026

Appearances and goals by national team and year
| National team | Year | Apps | Goals |
|---|---|---|---|
| Uruguay | 2023 | 1 | 0 |
| Uruguay | 2024 | 1 | 1 |
| Uruguay | 2025 | 7 | 1 |
| Uruguay | 2026 | 9 | 1 |
| Total | | 18 | 3 |

Scores and results list Uruguay's goal tally first, score column indicates score after each Viñas goal.

List of international goals scored by Federico Viñas
| No. | Date | Venue | Opponent | Score | Result | Competition |
|---|---|---|---|---|---|---|
| 1 | 26 March 2024 | Stade Bollaert-Delelis, Lens, France | Ivory Coast | 1–1 | 1–2 | Friendly |
| 2 | 4 September 2025 | Estadio Centenario, Montevideo, Uruguay | Peru | 3–0 | 3–0 | 2026 FIFA World Cup qualification |
| 3 | 17 November 2026 | Estadio Domingo Burgueño, Maldonado, Uruguay | Dominican Republic | 2–0 | 5–0 | Friendly |

== Honours ==
Toluca

- Leagues Cup: 2026

Individual

- CONCACAF Champions League Best Young Player: 2021
- CONCACAF Champions League Team of the Tournament: 2021
- Liga MX Golden Boot (Shared): Clausura 2024
- Liga MX Player of the Month: November 2023
