= Evelyn Calderón =

Ecuadorian, news journalist and show host (born 1987)

Evelyn Vanessa Calderón (born April 8, 1990) is an Ecuadorian television show host and news reporter. She has worked at Ecuavisa in Ecuador.

In Ecuador, she is also known as "La Coqueta" ("The Flirt").

== Career ==
Evelyn Vanessa began her career on TV in the Ecuavisa contact program as a Reporter and Presenter of the variety show

She was also the host of Ecuavisa's program "entre flashes" that is broadcast on Sundays

During one of her earlier jobs as a news reporter, she interviewed Puerto Rican hip-hop duo Wisin y Yandel, Maluma, Sebastián Yatra etc for Ecuadorian television.

== Personal life ==
In 2023, she announced she was moving from Ecuador to Bolivia along with her boyfriend. She later returned to Ecuador, to retake her early role as a dancer, on the reality series Soy el mejor.

As of 2024, she was dating Juan Rescalvo, the twin brother of Ismael Rescalvo, manager of Club Sport Emelec.
