= Mina Proaño =

Coordinates: 23.162°N 102.873°W

Mina Proaño, an underground silver mine located in central Mexico, is one of the world's largest and most profitable silver mines. The mine is located just outside the city of Fresnillo, Zacatecas; and is also known as Mina Fresnillo and Fresnillo Silver Mine. The mining operation is run by Peñoles, which has been controlled by Mexico City-based Grupo BAL since 1967. In 2004, Mina Proaño produced almost 32 million troy ounces (995,000 kg) of silver.

Silver mining activity in the Fresnillo area can be traced back to 1550. As is quite common with long-running large-scale mining operations, especially silver mining, which uses large quantities of cyanide, there have been allegations of mine-related pollution including contamination of water sources, increased illness rates amongst cattle and people, and increased air pollution. This particular mine has obtained ISO 14000 certification of its environmental management processes and equipment, and has received a "Clean Industry Registration" from Mexican authorities. The mining company has also established an "ecological park", which is basically a sanctuary for over a hundred species of mammals, birds and reptiles. This park, established in 2004, was designed as a public area (Parque los Jales) and includes lakes, paths and open areas for physical exercise and relaxation. The park was established on land formerly occupied by a tailings pond.
