= Alejandro Baillères =

Mexican businessman

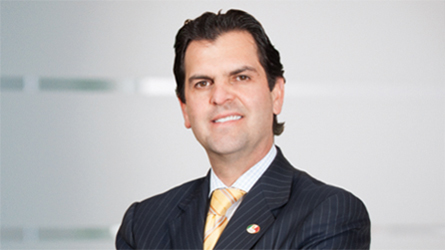
- Alejandro Baillères
- Born: Alejandro Baillères Gual; May 1960 (age 66)
- Education: Stanford University
- Occupation: Business magnate
- Title: CEO, Grupo Nacional Provincial
- Board member of: Peñoles; Grupo BAL; Fresnillo plc
- Parent: Alberto Baillères

Alejandro Baillères Gual (born May 1960) is a Mexican business magnate, the CEO of Grupo Nacional Provincial, and the son of the billionaire Alberto Baillères.

Alejandro Baillères was born in May 1960. He has a degree from Stanford University.

He is a director of Peñoles and Grupo BAL, both owned by his father, and of Fresnillo plc. He is a director of various other companies.
