= Grupo BAL =

Mexican conglomerate

- Headquarters: Mexico
- Key people: Alejandro Baillères, President (2022-present)
- Subsidiaries: El Palacio de Hierro; Grupo Nacional Provincial; Instituto Tecnológico Autónomo de México; Peñoles; Profuturo; ValMex
- Website: www.bal.com.mx

Grupo BAL is a cluster of Mexican companies in various sectors of the economy. Its president was Alberto Gonzalez Baillères, the second richest man in Mexico in 2013, according to Forbes. Gonzalez's son Alejandro Baillères has been president since 2022. The conglomerate is involved in Mexican sectors such as trade, energy, metallurgy, finance, insurance, pensions, investments, agriculture, health care, and music.

== Member companies ==
Grupo Nacional Provincial (GNP) is the largest insurance company in Mexico, with more than 20% of the market share in the country. It is the only insurance company with 100% domestically based capital. It is also perhaps the oldest domestically based insurance company in Mexico, having existed since at least the early 20th century.

Born from GNP, Profuturo is a retirement fund manager. Afore is the Mexican equivalent of a 401(k)) of Mexican workers. The company is the third largest in Mexico by AUM and the only one that isn't backed by a financial group.

El Palacio de Hierro is a department store chain that points to the most affluent market in Mexico, with international brands, many of which operate exclusively as Hermès, Burberry, and Adolfo Domínguez, among others. Founded in 1891 by a French businessman, it became the first department store in Mexico. The retail chain joined Grupo Bal in 1963. In addition to the operating department stores, of which there are nine locations, the group has diversified into the restaurant industry, design, travel, spa and boutique clothing brands.

The Autonomous Technological Institute of Mexico was founded on March 29, 1946, by the Mexican Association of Culture bringing together an outstanding group of bankers, industrialists and businessmen, led by Raúl Baillères, in order to make higher education the engine of industrial and economic change in Mexico.

Peñoles is a company in the mining and metallurgical operations in Latin America. It is the world's largest producer of refined silver and bismuth and Latin America's largest producer of lead and zinc.

VALMEX is a brokerage firm established in 1979. It offers specialized products and services for investment in the Mexican market.
