= Charly (brand) =

Mexican sports equipment company

- Type: Privately held company
- Industry: Sports equipment
- Founded: 1949; 77 years ago
- Headquarters: Leon, Guanajuato, Mexico
- Area served: Americas
- Products: Athletic shoes, sportswear, apparel, goalkeeper gloves, footballs
- Number of employees: 3,000
- Website: us.charly.com

Charly is a Mexican sports equipment manufacturing company headquartered in Leon, Guanajuato, Mexico. It was founded in 1949 and is one of the largest sportswear companies in Mexico and is the exclusive partner of Skechers, allowing them to sell their shoes within Mexico.

== History ==
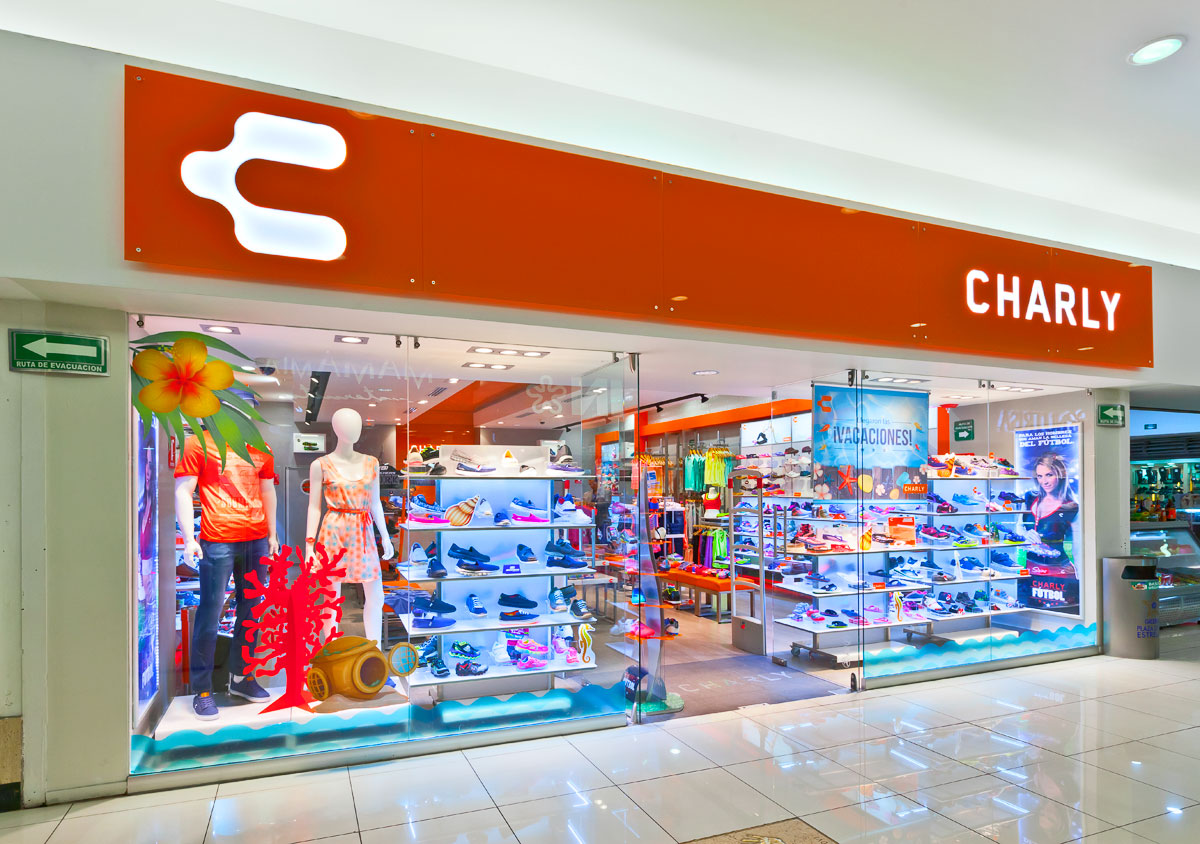
A store in a mall

The company was founded in 1949, in Leon Guanajuato, Mexico as a small shoe company named "Campanita" ("Little Bell" in Spanish), that originally only sold baby shoes hence its name. It wasn't until 1977 that the company decided to expand its business and started offering sneakers for other ages and changed its name to "Charly".

In 2010, Charly struck a deal with Skechers and became the official distributor of their shoes after Skechers had left the Mexican market. This deal meant a new found source of funding and allowed the company to expand its business.

With a booming business and greater success, the company decided to launch its own line of football gear in 2014 expanding from just selling shoes to selling equipment needed to play. At first the company only sponsored teams in the second division, Ascenso MX, but the success of its sales and marketing eventually led them to start sponsoring teams in the Liga MX first division and even teams and players outside of the country.

Charly is the official manufacturer of the Mexican Olympic uniforms for the 2024 Paris Olympics and 2028 Los Angeles Olympics.

Charly opened a store in the United States, at Plaza La Alameda Mall in Walnut Park, California, to serve the Greater Los Angeles area.

== Sponsorships ==
=== Football ===
==== Club teams ====
- (Mexico) Atlante
- (Mexico) Atlas
- (Mexico) Atlético San Luis
- (Mexico) León
- (Mexico) Santos Laguna
- (Mexico) Sinaloa
- (Chile) Everton
- (United States) Monterey Bay FC
- (United States) North Carolina FC
- (United States) Oakland Roots
- (United States) Oakland Soul
- (United States) Pittsburgh Riverhounds
- (United States) Project 51O
- (United States) Tampa Bay Rowdies

==== Players ====
- (Mexico) Héctor Moreno
