= Ismael Rescalvo =

Spanish footballer

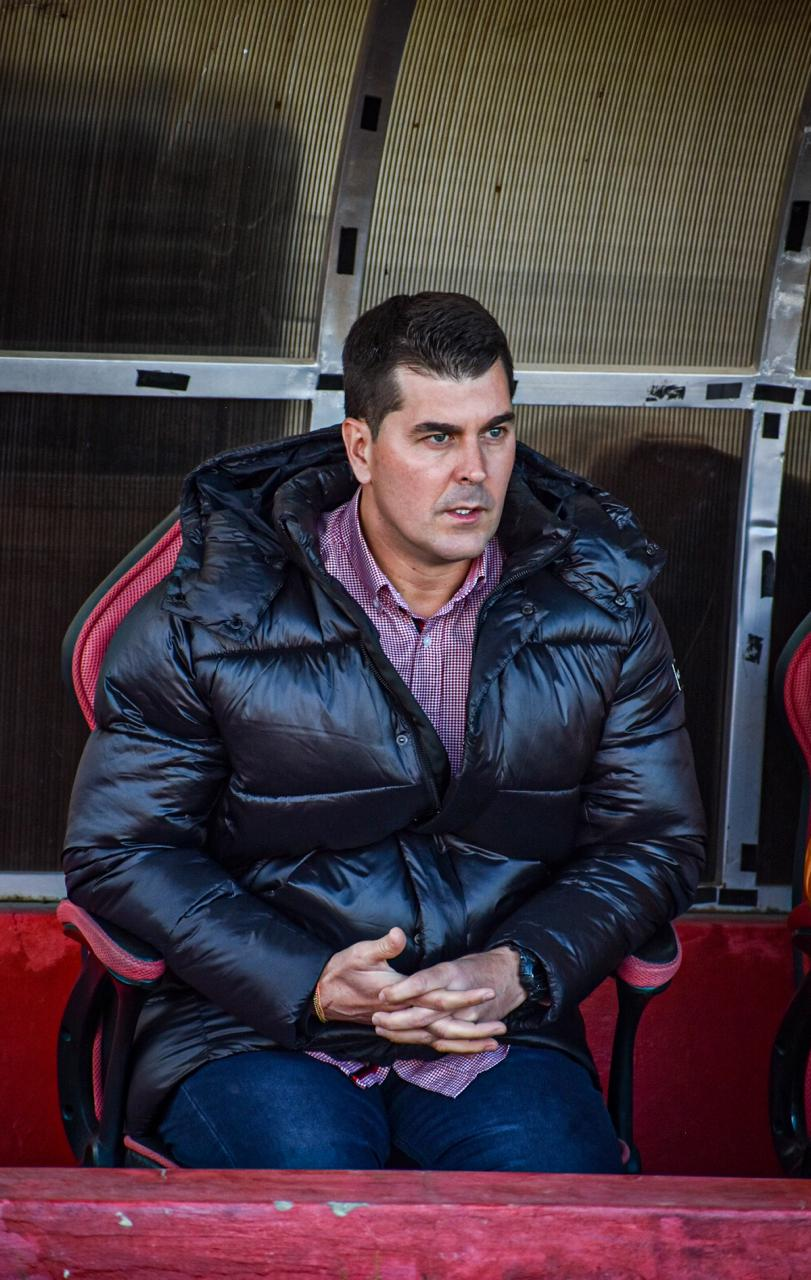

Personal information
- Full name: Ismael Rescalvo Sánchez
- Date of birth: 2 March 1982 (age 44)
- Place of birth: Valencia, Spain
- Height: 1.81 m (5 ft 11 in)
- Position: Centre-back

Youth career
- Massamagrell
- 1996–2002: Levante

Senior career*
Years	Team	Apps	(Gls)
2002–2003	Massamagrell		
2003–2010	Torre Levante		

Managerial career
- 2010–2011: La Creu (youth)
- 2011–2012: Levante (youth)
- 2012–2013: Torre Levante (youth)
- 2013–2016: Torre Levante
- 2016–2017: Envigado
- 2017–2018: Independiente Medellín
- 2018–2019: Independiente del Valle
- 2019–2022: Emelec
- 2023: The Strongest
- 2023–2024: Mazatlán
- 2024: The Strongest
- 2025: Deportes Tolima
- 2025: Barcelona SC
- * Club domestic league appearances and goals

Ismael Rescalvo Sánchez (born 2 March 1982) is a Spanish football manager and former player who played as a central defender.

== Career ==
Born in Valencia, Rescalvo joined Levante UD's youth setup at the age of 14. After representing Massamagrell UD and CF Torre Levante, he retired at the age of 28 due to an injury. After retiring he worked at La Creu CF and Levante's youth setup before returning to Torre Levante in 2012, taking over the club's Juvenil squad.

On 10 July 2013, Rescalvo was appointed manager of Torre Levante's first team in Tercera División. After avoiding relegation in his first two seasons, he took the club to a ninth position in his third, the club's best ever position in the league until then.

On 3 June 2016, Rescalvo was presented as the new manager of Categoría Primera A side Envigado FC. He resigned on 2 August of the following year, he took over Independiente Medellín as an interim manager on 16 October 2017.

Rescalvo was definitely appointed manager of DIM on 28 November 2017, but was dismissed the following 6 June. On 28 June 2018, he switched teams and countries again after being named manager of Independiente del Valle and since April 2019 he was appointed manager of Emelec.

On 25 November 2022, Rescalvo left Emelec on a mutual agreement. On 8 December, he was presented as manager of Bolivian side The Strongest.

Rescalvo resigned from Strongest on 8 May 2023, amidst rumours of an offer from Liga MX side Mazatlán. Ten days later, the move to the latter club was officially announced.

Sacked by Mazatlán on 8 April 2024, Rescalvo returned to his previous club The Strongest on 1 May, leaving at the end of the season after his contract with the Bolivian club ended.

On 4 January 2025, Rescalvo returned to Colombia after being appointed as manager of Deportes Tolima, but resigned on 19 June after Tolima ended their participation in the 2025 Apertura tournament. The following day, he was announced as the new manager of Ecuadorian side Barcelona SC.

On 5 January 2026, Rescalvo was sacked from Barcelona before the start of the season.

== Personal life ==
Rescalvo's twin brother Juan was also a footballer. A midfielder, he was also groomed at Levante. His twin brother Juan was, as of 2024, dating show host Evelyn Calderon.
