= Raúl Baillères =

Mexican businessperson

Raúl Baillères Chávez (Silao, Guanajuato, Mexico, 1895 – Mexico City, Mexico, 1967) was a Mexican businessman. He founded the Instituto Tecnológico Autónomo de México (ITAM) on 29 March 1946.

His son, Alberto Baillères, was at one time the fourth richest man in Mexico.
