= Peñoles =

Mexican mining company (1887–)

Industrias Peñoles S.A.B. de C.V.
- Type: Sociedad Anónima Bursátil de Capital Variable
- Traded as: BMV: PE&OLES
- Industry: Mining & Chemicals
- Founded: 1887; 139 years ago
- Headquarters: Mexico City, Mexico
- Key people: Alberto Baillères, (Chairman & CEO)
- Products: Metals, Chemicals
- Revenue: ▲US$ 7.8 billion (2011)
- Net income: ▲US$ 1.0 billion (2011)
- Number of employees: ▲66,838 (2019)
- Parent: Grupo BAL
- Website: www.penoles.com.mx

Industrias Peñoles, S.A.B. de C.V, or simply Peñoles, is a subsidiary company owned by Grupo BAL. Peñoles is the second largest Mexican mining company, the first Mexican producer of gold, zinc and lead and the world leader in silver production. Peñoles is a company with active mines within Mexico and with some prospection projects in South America. Holdings includes the Fresnillo Silver Mine / Mina Proaño, the Met-Mex Peñoles metallurgical complex and Química del Rey; a Chemical facility; three operations. Peñoles produces about 80,500,000 troy ounces (2,500,000 kg) of silver and 756,100 troy ounces (23,520 kg) of gold annually. Other metals that the company produces are zinc, lead, copper, bismuth, and cadmium.

The main product of Peñoles is refined silver in the form of ingots and granulated silver which are 99.99% pure silver, this product is made in Torreón (northern Mexico) and from this location is exported all over the world.

In 2012, the company was awarded with the Fray International Sustainability Award for its initiatives in sustainable development. They approach sustainability by achieving three dimensions: Economics, Ecology, and Ethics, and by consistently measuring and analyzing their environmental impact.

== History ==
Peñoles' history begins in 1887, with the mining concession of certain mines located within the Sierra de Peñoles in the state of Durango and the foundation of the Compañía Minera de Peñoles under the regime of President Porfirio Díaz.

From 1890 to 1960 the company suffered several mergers, fusions and acquisitions with others mining companies. During this time the company was owned by different shareholders, among them some from the United Kingdom, United States and Germany.

During the decade of 1960 to 1970 the Mexican mining industry was "mexicanized" and therefore Mr. Raúl Bailleres acquired the majority of the company shares, after that the company received the name of Industrias Peñoles.

== Divisions ==
Peñoles has three mining related divisions and a branch created for other business. They are located mainly in northern México.

- Grupo Metalúrgico, located mainly in Torreón
- Grupo Minas-Químicos, scattered along northern Mexico
- Grupo Exploración, with several geological prospects all over the country and in South America
- Grupo Infraestructura, with a thermoelectric power facility and an important sharing in a drinking water service company.
- The company is also the controlling shareholder of Linea Coahuila Durango.

== Grupo Metalúrgico ==
- Met-Mex Peñoles, zinc refinery that uses an electrolysis process
- Met-Mex Peñoles, lead-silver foundry
- Met-Mex Peñoles, lead-silver smelter and refinery
- Fertirey, sulphuric acid processor
- Met-Mex Peñoles, metallurgical specialities (Bermejillo, Durango)
- Aleazin, production of special alloys facility (zamak)

== Grupo Minas-Químicos ==
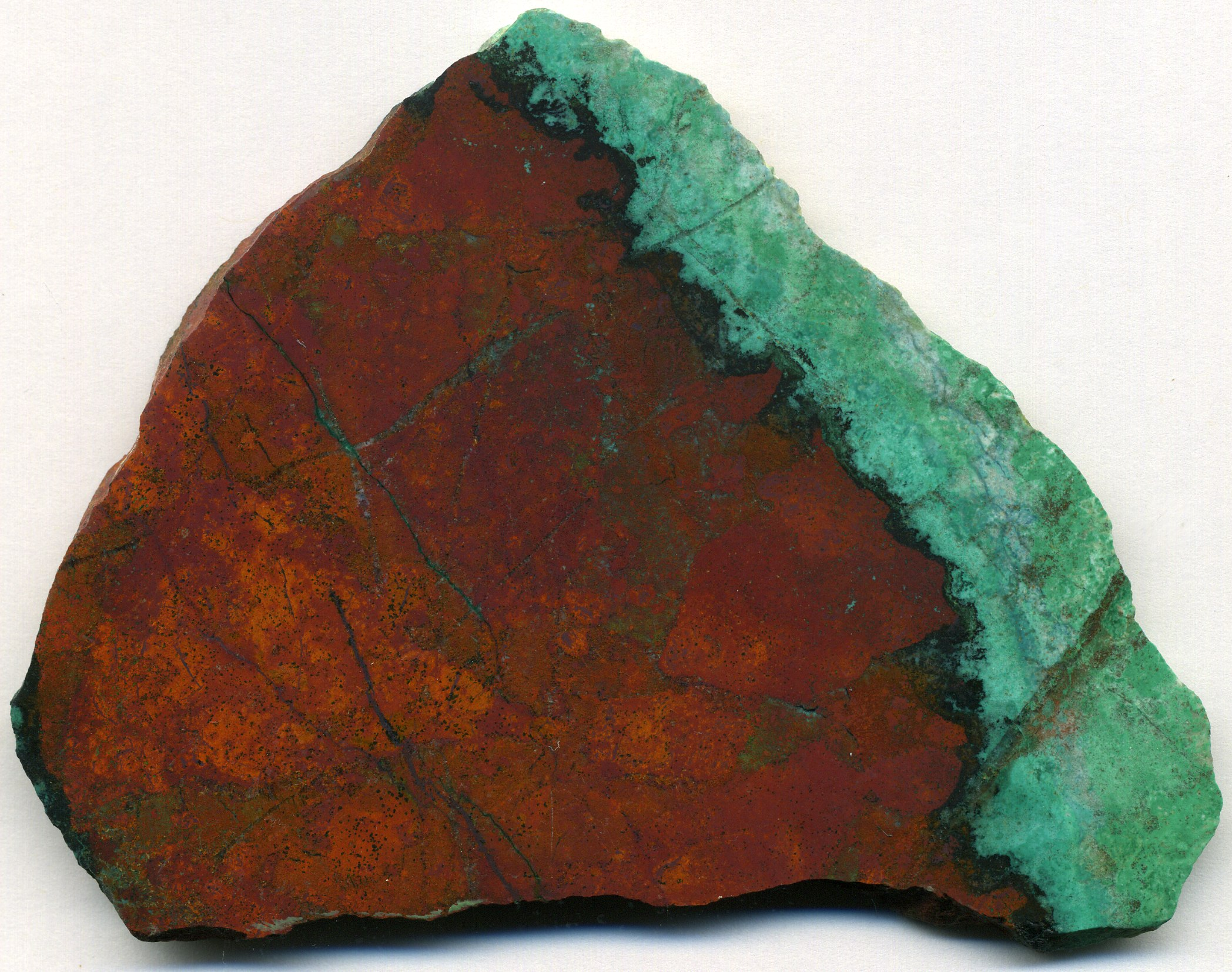
Oxide copper ore specimen from the Milpillas mine, SON

- Unidad Fresnillo, the world richest silver mine located in Zacatecas
- Unidad Francisco I. Madero, a big zinc ore deposit also in Zacatecas
- Unidad Sabinas, located near the town of Sombrerete, Zacatecas
- Unidad La Ciénega, a gold mine located at the foothills of the Sierra Madre Occidental
- Unidad La Herradura, a gold mine in association with the American mining company Newmont Mining Corporation and an open pit mine located in Sonora
- Unidad Bismark, located near the Mexican–American border
- Unidad Naica, a big lead ore deposit, located in the state of Chihuahua
- Unidad Tizapa, a lead and zinc mine located in central Mexico (Zacazonapan, State of Mexico near Valle de Bravo recreational complex)
- Química del Rey, production of sodium sulfate and magnesium oxide.
- Magnelec, production of special magnesite chemical compounds

== Grupo Exploración ==
- Milpillas Project, underground copper mine, located in the State of Sonora and with a future production of copper cathodes (2006)

== Grupo Infraestructura ==
- TEP / Termoeléctrica Peñoles, is a pet coke fired thermoelectric power plant, focused in the own generation of electricity and located near Tamuin, San Luis Potosí. The excedents of power generation are sells to CFE.
- Drinking water service, a joint venture with the French company Ondeo which is concentrated in several Mexican urban sites like Cancún and México City.
