= 2024–25 Club Puebla season =

Club Puebla
2024–25 season
- Manager: José Manuel de la Torre (until 14 November); Pablo Guede (from 2 December)
- Stadium: Estadio Cuauhtémoc
- Liga MX: 15th
- Leagues Cup: Group stage
- Top goalscorer: League: Lucas Cavallini (4); All: Lucas Cavallini (4)
- Biggest win: Puebla 1–0 Santos Laguna
- Biggest defeat: Necaxa 4–1 Puebla
Home colours	Away colours	Third colours

The 2024–25 season is the 81st season since the founding of Club Puebla. Puebla participates in the top division of Liga MX.

== Transfers ==
=== In ===
Pos.	Player	Transferred from	Fee	Date	Source
DF	(Mexico) Santiago Román	(Mexico) Venados	Loan return	30 June 2024	
FW	(Mexico) Rafael Duran	(Mexico) Atlante	Free	1 July 2024	
DF	(Mexico) Jorge Rodríguez	(Mexico) Deportivo Toluca	Loan	1 July 2024	
MF	(Mexico) Miguel Jiménez	(Mexico) Guadalajara	Free	1 July 2024	
MF	(Colombia) Kevin Velasco	(Colombia) Deportivo Cali		1 July 2024	
DF	(Uruguay) Emanuel Gularte	(Mexico) Querétaro FC	Undisclosed	2 July 2024	

=== Out ===
Pos.	Player	Transferred to	Fee	Date	Source
FW	(Mexico) Miguel Sansores	(Mexico) Mazatlán	Loan return	30 June 2024	
MF	(Argentina) Gabriel Carabajal	(Brazil) Santos	Loan return	30 June 2024	
MF	(Mexico) Fernando Navarro	(Mexico) Atlante	End of contract	1 July 2024	
MF	(Uruguay) Lucas de los Santos	(Mexico) Celaya	Loan	1 July 2024	
MF	(Mexico) Diego Zago	(Mexico) Tlaxcala		2 July 2024	
FW	(Mexico) Martín Barragán	(Mexico) Celaya	Undisclosed	24 July 2024	

== Pre-season matches ==
19 June 2024 Friendly	Coyotes de Tlaxcala	0–3	Puebla	Tlaxcala
				Stadium: Estadio Tlahuicole; Attendance: 0

22 June 2024 Friendly	Puebla	4–1	Deportivo Toluca	Puebla
16:45 UTC−6	Santiago Ormeño; Facundo Waller			Stadium: Estadio Cuauhtémoc

== Competitions ==
=== Overall record ===
Competition	First match	Last match	Starting round	Record							
Competition	First match	Last match	Starting round	Pld	W	D	L	GF	GA	GD	Win %
Liga MX	5 July 2024	10 November 2024	Matchday 1	17	4	2	11	17	31	−14	23.53
Leagues Cup	27 July 2024		Group stage	2	0	0	2	1	4	−3	0.00
Total				19	4	2	13	18	35	−17	21.05

Last updated: 10 November 2024
Source: Competitions

=== Liga MX ===
==== Torneo Apertura ====
===== League table =====
Pos	Team	Pld	W	D	L	GF	GA	GD	Pts
13	Necaxa	17	3	6	8	20	26	−6	15
14	Mazatlán	17	2	8	7	10	19	−9	14
15	Puebla	17	4	2	11	17	31	−14	14
16	Pachuca	17	3	4	10	20	29	−9	13
17	Querétaro	17	3	3	11	13	31	−18	12

Source: Liga MX
Rules for classification: 1) Points; 2) Goal difference; 3) Number of goals scored; 4) Head-to-head results between tied teams; 5) Number of goals scored away; 6) Highest relegation coefficient; 7) Fair Play points

===== Results summary =====
Overall								Home						Away					
Pld	W	D	L	GF	GA	GD	Pts	W	D	L	GF	GA	GD	W	D	L	GF	GA	GD
17	4	2	11	17	31	−14	14	3	1	5	13	15	−2	1	1	6	4	16	−12

Last updated: 10 November 2024.

===== Results by round =====
Round	1	2	3	4	5	6	7	8	9	10	11	12	13	14	15	16	17
Ground	H	A	H	H	A	A	H	A	H	H	A	H	A	H	A	H	A
Result	W	L	D	L	W	D	W	L	L	L	L	L	L	W	L	L	L
Position																	

Updated to match(es) played on 24 August 2024. Source:
A = Away; H = Home; W = Win; D = Draw; L = Loss

===== Matches =====
The match schedule was released on 6 June 2024.

5 July 2024 1	Puebla	1–0	Santos Laguna	Puebla
16:45 UTC−6	Waller (yellow card) 62'; Cavallini 90+6' (pen.)		Núñez (yellow card) 45'; Echeverría (yellow card) 48'; Cervantes (yellow card) 80'	Stadium: Estadio Cuauhtémoc; Attendance: 8,331; Referee: Jorge Abraham Camacho Peregrina

13 July 2024 2	Necaxa	4–1	Puebla	Aguascalientes
17:00 UTC−6	Palavecino 11'; Arce Jr. (yellow card) 36'; Cambindo 15', 52'; Rosero 76'; Paradela (yellow card) 80'		Durán 87'	Stadium: Estadio Victoria; Attendance: 13,540; Referee: Abraham de Jesús Quirarte Contreras

16 July 2024 3	Puebla	2–2	León	Puebla
21:00 UTC−6	Cavallini 13', 90+1' (pen.); Ferrareis (yellow card) 60'; De Buen (yellow card) 72'		Cádiz 26', 87', (yellow card) 88'	Stadium: Estadio Cuauhtémoc; Attendance: 7,883; Referee: Marco Antonio Ortiz Nava

19 July 2024 4	Puebla	1–2	Atlas	Puebla
21:05 UTC−6	Cavallini (yellow card) 37', (goal) 47'; Castillo (yellow card) 73'		Aguirre 9', 23'; Márquez (yellow card) 30'; Aguirre (yellow card) 82'; Vargas (yellow card) 89'	Stadium: Estadio Cuauhtémoc; Attendance: 10,847; Referee: Iván Antonio López Sánchez

16 August 2024 16	Puebla	1–2	Monterrey	Puebla
19:00 UTC−6	Orona (yellow card) 38'; Ferrareis (yellow card) 59'; Ormeño 81'		Cortizo (yellow card) 26'; Berterame 36'; Canales 55'; Andrada (yellow card) 83'; Medina (yellow card) 90+4'	Stadium: Estadio Cuauhtémoc; Referee: Salvador Pérez Villalobos

24 August 2024 5	América	0–1	Puebla	Mexico City
21:05 UTC−6			González (yellow card) 14'; Herrera (yellow card) 60'; Castillo 74'	Stadium: Estadio Ciudad de los Deportes; Attendance: 11,978; Referee: Luis Enrique Santander Aguirre

30 August 2024 6	Mazatlán	1–1	Puebla	Mazatlán
19:00 UTC−7	Sánchez 4'; Colula (yellow card) 45'		Castillo (yellow card) 3'; Olmedo (yellow card) 32', (red card); De Buen 35'; Gularte (yellow card) 52'; Ferrareis (yellow card) 87'; Álvarez (yellow card) 90+7'	Stadium: Estadio de Mazatlán; Attendance: 8,357; Referee: Ismael Rosario Lopez Penuelas

13 September 2024 7	Puebla	2-1	Querétaro	Puebla
18:00 UTC−6	Castillo (yellow card) 27'; Ferrareis 45+1'; Quiñones (yellow card) 71'; Ormeño 77' (pen.)		Robles 65'	Stadium: Estadio Cuauhtémoc; Referee: Vicente Reynoso Arce

17 September 2024 8	UNAM	1-0	Puebla	Mexico City
20:05 UTC−6	Martínez 72'		Gularte (red card); Quiñones (yellow card) 79'; Rodríguez (yellow card) 90+5'	Stadium: Estadio Olímpico Universitario; Attendance: 7,606; Referee: Iván López Sánchez

20 September 2024 9	Puebla	2-3	Pachuca	Puebla
18:00 UTC−6	Gómez 19', 60'; Quiñones (yellow card) 33'		Rondón 13'; Deossa 37', 72'; Moreno (yellow card) 88'	Stadium: Estadio Cuauhtémoc; Attendance: 7,676; Referee: Maximiliano Quintero Hernández

27 September 2024 10	Puebla	2-3	Juárez	Puebla
17:00 UTC−6	González (yellow card) 28'; Ferrareis (yellow card) 37'; Quiñones 47' (pen.), 90+8'; Angulo (yellow card) 67'; Herrera (yellow card) 86'		Estupiñán (yellow card) 34', (goal) 90+5' (pen.); Torres 40', (yellow card) 46'; García 68'	Stadium: Estadio Cuauhtémoc; Attendance: 5,147; Referee: Oscar Garcia

5 October 2024 11	UANL	1-0	Puebla	San Nicolás de los Garza
16:00 UTC−6	Gignac 16'; Angulo (yellow card) 80'		De Buen (yellow card) 45+2'; Quiñones (yellow card) 45+3'	Stadium: Estadio Universitario (UANL); Attendance: 26,270; Referee: Vicente Reynoso Arce

18 October 2024 12	Puebla	1-2	Cruz Azul	Puebla
20:05 UTC−6	Quiñones 45+7'; Orona (yellow card) 85'; Olmedo (yellow card) 85'		Giakoumakis 45+4', (yellow card) 47'; Faravelli (yellow card) 58'; Rotondi 71'; Piovi (yellow card) 88'	Stadium: Estadio Cuauhtémoc; Attendance: 34,978; Referee: Mario Terrazas Chávez

22 October 2024 13	Toluca	5-0	Puebla	Toluca
20:05 UTC−6	Pereira 15', (yellow card) 44'; Luan (yellow card) 29'; Violante 37'; Vega 52'; Paulinho 56', 90+4'			Stadium: Estadio Nemesio Díez; Attendance: 24,521; Referee: Jorge Abraham Camacho Peregrina

25 October 2024 14	Puebla	1-0	Guadalajara	Puebla
20:00 UTC−6	Gómez 63'; Ferrareis (yellow card) 72'			Stadium: Estadio Cuauhtémoc; Attendance: 32,325; Referee: Ismael Rosario Lopez Penuelas

2 November 2024 15	Atlético San Luis	2-0	Puebla	San Luis Potosí
16:00 UTC−6	Phillipe (yellow card) 23', (goal) 50'; Salles-Lamonge 45+4'; Dourad (yellow card) 55'; Sanabria (yellow card) 90+1'		Angulo (yellow card) 22'; Waller (yellow card) 69'	Stadium: Estadio Alfonso Lastras; Attendance: 15,768; Referee: Oscar Garcia

10 November 2024 17	Tijuana	2-1	Puebla	Tijuana
19:00 UTC−8	Zúñiga (yellow card) 29'; Fernández (yellow card) 59'; Castañeda (yellow card) 59'; Corona 60'; Tona (yellow card) 76'; González 90+13'		Gularte 8'; Ferrareis (yellow card) 58'; Rodríguez (yellow card) 59'; Quiñones (yellow card) 66', (red card); Angulo (yellow card) 77'; González (yellow card) 90'; Jiménez (yellow card) 90+4'	Stadium: Estadio Caliente; Attendance: 21,333; Referee: Ismael Rosario Lopez Penuelas

=== Leagues Cup ===
==== Group stage ====
Pos	Team	Pld	W	PW	PL	L	GF	GA	GD	Pts	Qualification	UAN	MIA	PUE
1	(Mexican Football Federation) UANL	2	2	0	0	0	4	2	+2	6	Advance to knockout stage	—	1–1	2–1
2	(United States Soccer Federation) Inter Miami CF	2	1	0	0	1	3	2	+1	3	Advance to knockout stage	—	—	—
3	(Mexican Football Federation) Puebla	2	0	0	0	2	1	4	−3	0		—	0–2	—

Source: Leagues Cup
Rules for classification: Tiebreakers

27 July 2024 1	Puebla (Mexico)	0–2	(United States) Inter Miami CF	Fort Lauderdale, United States
20:00 UTC−4		Report	Rojas 9'; Suárez 72'	Stadium: Chase Stadium

31 July 2024 2	Tigres UANL (Mexico)	2–1	(Mexico) Puebla	Houston, United States
20:30 UTC−5	Córdova 2'; Reyes 85'	Report	de Buen 12'	Stadium: Shell Energy Stadium
