= 2023–24 Cruz Azul season =

Cruz Azul
2023–24 season
- Sporting director: Óscar Pérez (until 24 November); Iván Alonso (from 13 December)
- Manager: Ricardo Ferretti (until 7 August); Joaquín Moreno (from 7 August, until 19 December); Martín Anselmi (from 20 December)
- Stadium: Estadio Azteca (until December 2023); Estadio Ciudad de los Deportes (from January 2024)
- Liga MX: Apertura: 16th (Did not qualify); Clausura: 2nd (Runners-up)
- Leagues Cup: Round of 32
- Top goalscorer: League: Uriel Antuna (14); All: Uriel Antuna (15)
- Highest home attendance: 67,623 v. Guadalajara (2 March 2024)
- Lowest home attendance: 9,358 v. Juárez (1 November 2023)
- Average home league attendance: 23,887
- Biggest win: 3–0 v. Atlético San Luis (H) (10 February 2024); 3–0 v. Guadalajara (H) (2 March 2024)
- Biggest defeat: 1–4 v. UNAM (H) (7 October 2023); 0–3 v. Santos Laguna (A) (9 March 2024)
Home colours	Away colours	Third colours

The 2023–24 Club de Futbol Cruz Azul season was the 97th season in the football club's history and the 59th consecutive season in the top flight of Mexican football. Cruz Azul competed in Liga MX and the Leagues Cup.

This season was the first without captain José de Jesús Corona, who leaved the club after 14 years (since 2009–10 as a first team player). It was also the first season since 2005–06 without the center-back Julio César Domínguez.

== Kits ==
- Supplier: Pirma
- Sponsors: Cemento Cruz Azul (front), Caliente (back)

== Season overview ==
=== May ===
On 31 May, Uriel Antuna and Carlos Rodríguez were called up to the Mexico national team squad for the 2023 CONCACAF Gold Cup.

=== June ===
On 1 June, Rafael Guerrero and Rodrigo Huescas were called up to the Mexico national under-23 team for friendlies in Europe and the 2023 Central American and Caribbean Games.

On 27 June, the Leagues Cup announced Cruz Azul's first match against Inter Miami would be rescheduled as the tournament's inaugural match due to Inter Miami's high-profile signings of Lionel Messi and Sergio Busquets.

=== July ===
On 5 July, Ivan Morales' contract was rescinded and he became a free agent.

Willer Ditta did not travel with the team to the United States for the first Leagues Cup match due to work visa issues. On 24 July, Cruz Azul announced Ditta obtained his visa and would travel to join the team.

Rodrigo Huescas was subbed out in the 30th minute of the match against Inter Miami due to injury. On 24 July, Cruz Azul announced Huescas had suffered a sprain in his right MCL.

=== August ===
On 7 August, Cruz Azul announced they had parted ways with manager Ricardo Ferretti and would appoint assistant coach Joaquín Moreno as manager for the remainder of the Apertura 2023 season.

=== September ===
On 1 September, Uriel Antuna and Carlos Rodríguez were called up to the Mexico national team squad for friendlies against Australia and Uzbekistan. Érik Lira and Rodrigo Huescas were called up to the Mexico national under-23 team for friendlies against Colombia under-23. Rafael Guerrero was called up to the Mexico national under-20 team for friendlies against Argentine Primera División clubs.

== Coaching staff ==
Apertura 2023 Rounds 1–3, Leagues Cup
Position	Name	Nationality	Year appointed	Last club/team	References
Manager	Ricardo Ferretti	Brazil	2023	(Mexico) FC Juárez (as manager)	
Assistant managers	Guillermo Vázquez	Mexico	2023	(Mexico) Necaxa (as manager)	
Assistant managers	Joaquín Moreno	Mexico	2023	(Mexico) Cruz Azul (as interim manager)	
Assistant managers	Enrique Cruz	Mexico	2023	(Mexico) Pachuca (as assistant manager)	
Medic	Juan José Pérez	Mexico	2021	(Mexico) Veracruz	
Medic	Ernesto Prado	Mexico	2015	(Mexico) Cruz Azul Hidalgo	
Medic	José Morales Ángeles	Mexico	2023	None	
Fitness trainer	Guillermo Orta	Mexico	2023	(Mexico) FC Juárez	
Kinesiologist	Juan Rubio	Mexico	2009		
Kinesiologist	Paolo Arriaga	Mexico	2023	(Mexico) Veracruz	

Apertura 2023 Rounds 4–17
Position	Name	Nationality	Year appointed	Last club/team	References
Manager	Joaquín Moreno	Mexico	2023	(Mexico) Cruz Azul (as assistant coach)	
Assistant managers	Joel Huiqui	Mexico	2023	(Mexico) Cruz Azul U23 (as manager)	
Assistant managers	Enrique Cruz	Mexico	2023	(Mexico) Pachuca (as assistant manager)	
Medic	Juan José Pérez	Mexico	2021	(Mexico) Veracruz	
Medic	Ernesto Prado	Mexico	2015	(Mexico) Cruz Azul Hidalgo	
Medic	José Morales Ángeles	Mexico	2023	None	
Fitness trainer	Fernando Ramos	Mexico	2023	(Mexico) Leones Negros	
Kinesiologist	Juan Rubio	Mexico	2009		
Kinesiologist	Paolo Arriaga	Mexico	2023	(Mexico) Veracruz	

Clausura 2024
Position	Name	Nationality	Year appointed	Last club/team	References
Manager	Martín Anselmi	Argentina	2024	(Ecuador) Independiente del Valle (as manager)	
Assistant managers	Facundo Oreja	Argentina	2024	(Ecuador) Independiente del Valle (as assistant manager)	
Assistant managers	Luis Pastur	Spain	2024	(Ecuador) Independiente del Valle (as assistant manager)	
Goalkeeper coach	Esteban Herrera	Argentina	2024	Argentina U17	
Medic	Antonio Acevedo	Mexico	2024	(Mexico) UNAM	
Medic	Juan Pérez	Mexico	2021	(Mexico) Veracruz	
Fitness trainer	Diego Bottaioli	Uruguay	2024	(Ecuador) Independiente del Valle	
Fitness trainer	Fernando Ramos	Mexico	2023	(Mexico) Leones Negros	
Fitness trainer	Alberto Sciegata	Argentina	2024	(Ecuador) Independiente del Valle	
Kinesiologist	Paolo Arriaga	Mexico	2023	(Mexico) Veracruz	
Kinesiologist	Juan Rubio	Mexico	2009		

== Squad ==
No.	Player	Nationality	Date of birth (age)	Since	Signed from
Goalkeepers
1	Andrés Gudiño	(Mexico)	26 January 1997 (aged 27)	2019	(Mexico) Venados
12	Luis Jiménez	(Mexico)	27 August 2004 (aged 19)	2024	(Mexico) Necaxa
23	Kevin Mier	(Colombia)	18 May 2000 (aged 24)	2024	(Colombia) Atlético Nacional
Defenders
2	Rafael Guerrero	(Mexico)	13 January 2003 (aged 21)	2023	(Mexico) Cruz Azul Academy
3	Carlos Salcedo (vice-captain)	(Mexico)	29 September 1993 (aged 30)	2023	(Mexico) Juárez
4	Willer Ditta	(Colombia)	23 January 1997 (aged 27)	2023	(Argentina) Newell's Old Boys
13	Camilo Cándido	(Uruguay)	2 June 1995 (aged 29)	2024	(Uruguay) Nacional
26	Carlos Vargas	(Mexico)	14 February 1999 (aged 25)	2023	(Mexico) Mazatlán
31	Luis Iturbide	(Mexico)	8 May 2002 (aged 22)	2024	(Mexico) Cruz Azul Academy
33	Gonzalo Piovi	(Argentina)	8 September 1994 (aged 29)	2023	(Argentina) Racing Club
Midfielders
6	Érik Lira	(Mexico)	8 May 2000 (aged 24)	2022	(Mexico) UNAM
7	Uriel Antuna	(Mexico)	21 August 1997 (aged 26)	2022	(Mexico) Guadalajara
8	Lorenzo Faravelli	(Argentina)	29 March 1993 (aged 31)	2024	(Ecuador) Independiente del Valle
14	Alexis Gutiérrez	(Mexico)	26 February 2000 (aged 24)	2019	(Mexico) Cruz Azul Academy
15	Ignacio Rivero (captain)	(Uruguay)	10 April 1992 (aged 32)	2020	(Mexico) Tijuana
18	Rodrigo Huescas	(Mexico)	18 September 2003 (aged 20)	2021	(Mexico) Cruz Azul Academy
19	Carlos Rodríguez	(Mexico)	3 January 1997 (aged 27)	2022	(Mexico) Monterrey
29	Carlos Rotondi	(Argentina)	2 March 1997 (aged 27)	2022	(Argentina) Defensa y Justicia
32	Cristian Jiménez	(Mexico)	18 July 2002 (aged 21)	2021	(Mexico) Cruz Azul Academy
Forwards
9	Ángel Sepúlveda	(Mexico)	15 February 1991 (aged 33)	2023	(Mexico) Querétaro
27	Gabriel Fernández	(Uruguay)	13 May 1994 (aged 30)	2024	(Mexico) UNAM

== Transfers ==
=== In ===
Date	Position	No.	Player	From	Type	Ref.
16 June 2023	DF	3	(Mexico) Carlos Salcedo	(Mexico) Juárez	Transfer	
16 June 2023	MF	10	(Brazil) Moisés Vieira	(Brazil) Fortaleza	Transfer	
21 June 2023	FW	28	(Colombia) Diber Cambindo	(Colombia) Independiente Medellín	Transfer	
27 June 2023	MF	5	(Colombia) Kevin Castaño	(Colombia) Águilas Doradas	Transfer	
6 July 2023	DF	4	(Colombia) Willer Ditta	(Argentina) Newell's Old Boys	Transfer	
13 July 2023	MF	8	(Mexico) Jesús Dueñas	(Mexico) Juárez	Transfer	
29 August 2023	FW	9	(Mexico) Ángel Sepúlveda	(Mexico) Querétaro	Transfer	
22 December 2023	DF	33	(Argentina) Gonzalo Piovi	(Argentina) Racing Club	Transfer	
27 December 2023	DF	13	(Uruguay) Camilo Cándido	(Uruguay) Nacional	Transfer	
28 December 2023	FW	27	(Uruguay) Gabriel Fernández	(Mexico) UNAM	Transfer	
30 December 2023	MF	8	(Argentina) Lorenzo Faravelli	(Ecuador) Independiente del Valle	Transfer	
30 December 2023	GK	12	(Mexico) Luis Jiménez	(Mexico) Necaxa	Loan	
12 January 2024	GK	23	(Colombia) Kevin Mier	(Colombia) Atlético Nacional	Transfer	

=== Out ===
Date	Position	No.	Player	To	Type	Ref.
10 May 2023	FW	13	(Ecuador) Michael Estrada	(Mexico) Toluca	Loan return	
10 May 2023	FW	8	(Uruguay) Gonzalo Carneiro	(Switzerland) Sion	Loan return	
11 May 2023	DF	12	(Mexico) José Joaquín Martínez	Free agent	End of contract	
17 May 2023	DF	25	(Argentina) Ramiro Funes Mori	(Argentina) River Plate	Released	
18 May 2023	DF	3	(Mexico) Jaiber Jiménez	Free agent	End of contract	
27 May 2023	DF	4	(Mexico) Julio César Domínguez	(Mexico) Atlético San Luis	Released	
10 June 2023	DF	28	(Mexico) Jordan Silva	(Mexico) Atlético San Luis	Loan	
12 June 2023	MF	22	(Mexico) Rafael Baca	(United States) Monterey Bay FC	Released	
20 June 2023	MF	23	(Argentina) Ramiro Carrera	(Argentina) Atlético Tucumán	Loan	
23 June 2023	GK	1	(Mexico) José de Jesús Corona	(Mexico) Tijuana	End of contract	
5 July 2023	FW	20	(Chile) Iván Morales	Not registered		
12 August 2023	FW	21	(Argentina) Augusto Lotti	(Argentina) Lanús	Loan	
29 August 2023	FW	11	(Uruguay) Christian Tabó	(Mexico) UNAM	Loan	
5 December 2023	GK	25	(Mexico) Sebastián Jurado	(Mexico) Juárez	Loan	
28 December 2023	FW	10	(Brazil) Moisés	(Brazil) Fortaleza	Transfer	
29 December 2023	FW	28	(Colombia) Diber Cambindo	(Mexico) Necaxa	Loan	
3 January 2024	MF	8	(Mexico) Jesús Dueñas	Retired		
16 January 2024	DF	17	(Mexico) Alonso Escoboza	(Mexico) Mazatlán	Transfer	
17 January 2024	FW	21	(Chile) Iván Morales	(Argentina) Sarmiento	Released	
21 January 2024	MF	5	(Colombia) Kevin Castaño	(Russia) Krasnodar	Transfer	
31 January 2024	DF	24	(Paraguay) Juan Escobar	(Mexico) Toluca	Loan	

== Pre-season and friendlies ==
Win Draw Loss Fixtures

=== Matches ===
14 June 2023 Friendly	UNAM (Mexico)	1–0	(Mexico) Cruz Azul	Coyoacán, Mexico City
	Del Prete			Stadium: Cantera

21 June 2023 Friendly	Cruz Azul (Mexico)	3–1	(Mexico) Juárez	Xochimilco, Mexico City
9:00 CDT	Lotti; Tabó; Iturbide	Report	Goal	Stadium: La Noria; Attendance: 0

24 June 2023 Friendly	América (Mexico)	3–1	(Mexico) Cruz Azul	Coapa, Mexico City
10:00 CDT	B. Rodríguez; de los Ríos	Report	Moisés	Stadium: Coapa; Attendance: 0

31 December 2023 Friendly	Cruz Azul (Mexico)	3–0	(Mexico) Atlante F.C.	Xochimilco, Mexico City
	Uriel Antuna; Gabriel Fernández; Willer Ditta	Report		Stadium: La Noria; Attendance: 0

23 March 2024 Friendly	América (Mexico)	2–3	(Mexico) Cruz Azul	Carson, United States
	Hernández 9'; Fidalgo 17'	Report	Sepúlveda 11'; Rotondi 50', 56'	Stadium: Dignity Health Sports Park; Attendance: 25,405

== Competitions ==
=== Overview ===
Competition	First match	Last match	Starting round	Final position	Record							
Competition	First match	Last match	Starting round	Final position	Pld	W	D	L	GF	GA	GD	Win %
Liga MX Apertura	1 July 2023	12 November 2023	Matchday 1	16th	17	5	2	10	21	29	−8	29.41
Liga MX Clausura	13 January 2024	26 May 2024	Matchday 1	Runners-up	23	12	5	6	30	20	+10	52.17
Leagues Cup	21 July 2023	3 August 2023	Group stage	Round of 32	3	0	2	1	2	3	−1	0.00
Total					43	17	9	17	53	52	+1	39.53

Last updated: 26 May 2024
Source: Mediotiempo.com

=== Liga MX Apertura ===
==== League table ====
Pos	Team	Pld	W	D	L	GF	GA	GD	Pts
14	Querétaro	17	5	4	8	18	29	−11	19
15	Juárez	17	5	3	9	24	34	−10	18
16	Cruz Azul	17	5	2	10	21	29	−8	17
17	Atlas	17	4	5	8	14	24	−10	17
18	Necaxa	17	3	6	8	18	27	−9	15

Source: Liga MX
Rules for classification: 1) Points; 2) Goal difference; 3) Number of goals scored; 4) Head-to-head results between tied teams; 5) Number of goals scored away; 6) Highest relegation coefficient; 7) Fair Play points

==== Results summary ====
Overall								Home						Away					
Pld	W	D	L	GF	GA	GD	Pts	W	D	L	GF	GA	GD	W	D	L	GF	GA	GD
17	5	2	10	21	29	−8	17	2	1	5	10	16	−6	3	1	5	11	13	−2

Last updated: 12 November 2023.
Source: Mediotiempo.com

==== Results by round ====
Round	1	2	3	4	5	6	7	8	9	10	11	12	13	14	15	16	17
Ground	A	H	A	H	A	A	H	A	H	A	A	H	A	H	H	A	H
Result	L	L	L	D	L	W	L	D	L	W	W	L	L	W	W	L	L
Position	17	18	18	18	18	16	17	17	17	17	14	16	17	16	14	16	16
Points	0	0	0	1	0	4	4	5	5	8	11	11	11	14	17	17	17

Updated to match(es) played on 12 November 2023. Source: Mediotiempo.com
A = Away; H = Home; W = Win; D = Draw; L = Loss

==== Matches ====
Win Draw Loss Fixtures

The league fixtures were announced on 8 June 2023.

===== Regular phase =====
1 July 2023 1	Atlas	2–0	Cruz Azul	Guadalajara
21:10 CT	Aguirre 5'; Rocha 72'; Lozano (yellow card) 85' (yellow-red card) 90+6'	Report	Iturbide (yellow card) 37'; Rivero (yellow card) 80'	Stadium: Estadio Jalisco; Attendance: 20,169; Referee: Víctor Cáceres Hernández

8 July 2023 2	Cruz Azul	0–2	Toluca	Mexico City
17:50 CT	Jurado (red card) 39'; Cambindo (yellow card) 52'; Rivero (yellow card) 53'; Jiménez (yellow card) 83'; Rotondi (yellow card) 90+3'	Report	López (yellow card) 29'; Huerta (yellow card) 29'; Volpi 36' (pen.); Domínguez (yellow card) 57', (goal) 90+2'; Araújo (yellow card) 65'	Stadium: Estadio Azteca; Attendance: 15,936; Referee: Ismael López Peñuelas

14 July 2023 3	Tijuana	2–1	Cruz Azul	Tijuana
20:10 PT	L. Rodríguez (yellow card) 50'; González 57'; Cambindo 90+2' (o.g.)	Report	Rivero 45'; Cambindo (yellow card) 90'; Salcedo (yellow card) 90+5'	Stadium: Estadio Caliente; Attendance: 28,333; Referee: Edgar Allan Morales

20 August 2023 4	Cruz Azul	2–2	Santos Laguna	Mexico City
17:00 CT	Cambindo 10'; Rodríguez (yellow card) 27'; Gudiño (yellow card) 41'; Antuna 45' (pen.); Escobar (yellow card) 90+7'	Report	Preciado 2', 64' (pen.); Govea (yellow card) 25'; Campos (yellow card) 88'	Stadium: Estadio Azteca; Attendance: 11,053; Referee: Marco Antonio Ortiz Nava

23 August 2023 5	Pachuca	1–0	Cruz Azul	Pachuca
19:06 CT	Moreno (yellow card) 24'; Cabral (yellow card) 43'; I. Hernández 63', (yellow card) 70'	Report	Gudiño (yellow card) 27'; Ditta (yellow card) 70'; Escobar (yellow card) 90+8'; Salcedo (yellow card) 90+10'	Stadium: Estadio Hidalgo; Attendance: 8,242; Referee: Jesus Rafael Lopez Valle

27 August 2023 6	Monterrey	1–2	Cruz Azul	Guadalupe
20:05 CT	Gallardo (yellow card) 32'; Andrada (yellow card) 41'; Meza 45+4'	Report	Cambindo 9', (yellow card) 42'; Guerrero (yellow card) 34'; Ditta (yellow card) 38'; Moisés 49'; Huescas (yellow card) 55'; Jurado (yellow card) 90+6'	Stadium: Estadio BBVA; Attendance: 42,313; Referee: César Arturo Ramos Palazuelos

2 September 2023 7	Cruz Azul	2–3	América	Mexico City
21:10 CT	Rotondi 24', (yellow card) 52'; Rodríguez (red card) 37'; Antuna (yellow card) 47', (goal) 80'; Escobar (yellow card) 53'; Ditta (yellow card) 90+1'	Report	Quiñones 4'; Malagón (yellow card) 29'; Sánchez (yellow card) 35' (goal) 45+5'; dos Santos (yellow card) 41'; B. Rodríguez 45+8'; Fuentes (yellow card) 73'; Cáceres (yellow card) 83'; Zendejas (yellow card) 90+1'	Stadium: Estadio Azteca; Attendance: 36,500; Referee: Daniel Quintero Huitrón

15 September 2023 8	Mazatlán	2–2	Cruz Azul	Mazatlán
18:50 PT	Benedetti 14'; Colula (yellow card) 30', (goal) 39'; Esquivel (yellow card) 90+6'	Report	Gudiño (yellow card) 12'; Cambindo 48', 90+2'; Guerrero (yellow card) 54'; Rotondi (yellow card) 74'; Escobar (yellow card) 90+5'; Rivero (yellow card) 90+5'	Stadium: Estadio de Mazatlán; Attendance: 11,002; Referee: Marco Antonio Ortiz Nava

24 September 2023 9	Cruz Azul	1–3	Querétaro	Mexico City
16:00 CT	Rotondi (yellow card) 29', (goal) 45+5'	Report	Lértora (yellow card) 33'; Sandoval 50'; Zúñiga 77', (yellow card) 78'; Cordero 87'; Gularte (yellow card) 90+2'	Stadium: Estadio Azteca; Attendance: 23,790; Referee: Abraham De Jesús Contreras

29 September 2023 10	Atlético San Luis	1–2	Cruz Azul	San Luis Potosi
21:00 CT	Villalpando 70'; Sanabria (yellow card) 75'	Report	Salcedo (yellow card) 9'; Rotondi (yellow card) 21', (goal) 51'; Rodríguez (yellow card) 77'; Antuna 87'	Stadium: Estadio Alfonso Lastras; Attendance: 21,180; Referee: Adonai Gonzalez

4 October 2023 11	Necaxa	1–3	Cruz Azul	Aguascalientes
19:00 CT	Batista 55'; Monreal (yellow card) 71'	Report	Sepúlveda 21', 90+2', 90+10', (yellow card) 90+12'; Rivero (yellow card) 88'	Stadium: Estadio Victoria; Attendance: 10,923; Referee: Fernando Guerrero Ramírez

7 October 2023 12	Cruz Azul	1–4	UNAM	Mexico City
21:10 CT	Rivero (yellow card) 29'; Escobar (yellow card) 42'; Sepúlveda 45+2'	Report	Huerta 30' (pen.), 60'; López (yellow card) 36'; Salvio (yellow card) 43'; Monroy (yellow card) 46'; González (yellow card) 58'; Aldrete (yellow card) 58'; Rivas 72'; Silva 80'	Stadium: Estadio Azteca; Attendance: 28,878; Referee: César Arturo Ramos Palazuelos

21 October 2023 13	UANL	2–1	Cruz Azul	San Nicolás de los Garza
21:10 CT	Lainez (yellow card) 23'; Angulo (yellow card) 38'; Gignac (yellow card) 40', (goal) 61'; Carioca 90+6'	Report	Antuna 45+3'; Salcedo (yellow card) 82'; Cambindo (yellow card) 86'; Guerrero (yellow card) 90+4'	Stadium: Estadio Universitario; Attendance: 41,615; Referee: Edgar Morales

28 October 2023 14	Cruz Azul	1–0	León	Mexico City
17:00 CT	Sepúlveda 16'; Escobar (yellow card) 29'; Rodríguez (yellow card) 75'; Castaño (yellow card) 90'	Report	Rubio (yellow card) 50'; Sánchez (yellow card) 70'; Bellón (yellow card) 80'	Stadium: Estadio Azteca; Attendance: 11,001; Referee: Brian Omar González Veles

1 November 2023 15	Cruz Azul	2–0	Juárez	Mexico City
19:00 CT	Sepúlveda 14'; Huescas (yellow card) 34'; Antuna 62'; Escobar (yellow card) 64'	Report	García (yellow card) 81'; Campillo (yellow card) 88'	Stadium: Estadio Azteca; Attendance: 9,358; Referee: Daniel Quintero Huitrón

4 November 2023 16	Guadalajara	1–0	Cruz Azul	Zapopan
21:05 CT	Gutiérrez (yellow card) 39'; Padilla 90+7'	Report	Castaño (yellow card) 41'; Sepúlveda (yellow card) 68'; Ditta (yellow card) 90+2'	Stadium: Estadio Akron; Attendance: 36,847; Referee: Adonai Gonzalez

12 November 2023 17	Cruz Azul	1–2	Puebla	Mexico City
18:00 CT	Ditta 45'; Guerrero (yellow card) 67'; Antuna (yellow card) 90+7'	Report	Martínez 20'; Angulo (yellow card) 28'; Silva 59'; Herrera (yellow card) 84'; de los Santos (yellow card) 90+9'; Sansores (yellow card) 90+9'	Stadium: Estadio Azteca; Attendance: 18,653; Referee: Luis Enrique Santander Aguirre

=== Liga MX Clausura ===
==== League table ====
Pos	Team	Pld	W	D	L	GF	GA	GD	Pts	Qualification
1	América (C)	17	10	5	2	30	12	+18	35	Qualification for the quarter-finals (Note: The first four places in the table will qualify for the Liguilla quarter-finals and host the second leg. The fifth and sixth placed teams will host the first leg.)
2	Cruz Azul	17	10	3	4	23	14	+9	33	Qualification for the quarter-finals
3	Toluca	17	9	5	3	38	23	+15	32	Qualification for the quarter-finals
4	Monterrey	17	9	5	3	32	19	+13	32	Qualification for the quarter-finals
5	Tigres	17	9	4	4	34	23	+11	31	Qualification for the quarter-finals

Source: Liga MX
Rules for classification: 1) Points; 2) Goal difference; 3) Number of goals scored; 4) Head-to-head results between tied teams; 5) Number of goals scored away; 6) Highest relegation coefficient; 7) Fair Play points
(C) Champions

==== Results summary ====
Overall								Home						Away					
Pld	W	D	L	GF	GA	GD	Pts	W	D	L	GF	GA	GD	W	D	L	GF	GA	GD
23	12	5	6	30	20	+10	41	6	3	3	19	12	+7	6	2	3	11	8	+3

Last updated: 26 May 2024.
Source: Mediotiempo.com

==== Results by round ====
Round	1	2	3	4	5	6	7	8	9	10	11	12	13	14	15	16	17
Ground	H	A	H	H	A	H	H	A	A	H	A	H	A	H	A	H	A
Result	L	D	W	W	W	W	W	W	L	W	L	L	D	W	W	D	W
Position	14	12	9	6	5	4	1	1	2	2	3	4	5	4	4	3	2
Points	0	1	4	7	10	13	16	19	19	22	22	22	23	26	29	30	33

Updated to match(es) played on 27 April 2024. Source: Mediotiempo.com
A = Away; H = Home; W = Win; D = Draw; L = Loss

==== Matches ====
The league fixtures were announced on 19 December 2023.

===== Regular phase =====
13 January 2024 1	Cruz Azul	0–1	Pachuca	Mexico City
19:00 CT	Rivero (yellow card) 17'; Lira (yellow card) 41'	Report	Cabral (yellow card) 11'; Pedraza (yellow card) 34'; Rondón 78'	Stadium: Estadio Ciudad de los Deportes; Attendance: 26,100; Referee: Iván López Sánchez

19 January 2024 2	Juárez	0–0	Cruz Azul	Juárez
20:10 MT	Venegas (yellow card) 17'; Chávez (yellow card) 75'	Report	Ditta (yellow card) 60'; Rivero (yellow card) 76'; Piovi (yellow card) 81'	Stadium: Estadio Juarez; Attendance: 13,714; Referee: Erick Yair Miranda Galindo

27 January 2024 3	Cruz Azul	2–1	Mazatlán	Mexico City
17:00 CT	Fernández 16'; Sepúlveda 45+6'; Faravelli (yellow card) 61'; Antuna (yellow card) 64'	Report	Del Prete 10'; Esquivel (red card) 41'; Díaz (yellow card) 55'; Rubio (yellow card) 57'	Stadium: Estadio Ciudad de los Deportes; Attendance: 20,032; Referee: Luis Enrique Santander Aguirre

30 January 2024 4	Cruz Azul	1–0	Tijuana	Mexico City
19:00 CT	Antuna (yellow card) 45+2'; Rodríguez (yellow card) 45+2'; G. Fernández (yellow card) 45+7'; Sepúlveda 46', (yellow card) 82'; Faravelli (yellow card) 50'; Guerrero (yellow card) 79'	Report	Contreras (yellow card) 40'; R. Fernández (yellow card) 88'	Stadium: Estadio Ciudad de los Deportes; Attendance: 16,650; Referee: Jesús Rafael López Valle

2 February 2024 5	Querétaro	1–3	Cruz Azul	Querétaro
19:00 CT	Barrera 5'; Gularte (yellow card) 25'; Sierra (yellow card) 44'; Sosa (yellow card) 53'; Ortíz (yellow card) 55'; Manzanares (yellow card) 90+6'	Report	Rivero 29'; Antuna 42'; Fernández 45+1'; Ditta (yellow card) 53'	Stadium: Estadio Corregidora; Attendance: 24,777; Referee: Jorge Abraham Camacho Peregrina

10 February 2024 6	Cruz Azul	3–0	Atlético San Luis	Mexico City
19:05 CT	Rotondi 38' (pen.); Antuna 64'; Huescas 73'	Report	Sanabria (yellow card) 37'; Cruz (yellow card) 90'	Stadium: Estadio Ciudad de los Deportes; Attendance: 23,826; Referee: Fernando Guerrero Ramírez

17 February 2024 7	Cruz Azul	1–0	UANL	Mexico City
21:05 CT	Reyes 83' (o.g.); Ditta (yellow card) 90+1' (yellow-red card) 90+4'; Rodríguez (yellow card) 90+3'	Report	Purata (yellow card) 75'; Gignac (yellow card) 77'; Herrera (yellow card) 80'; Guzmán (yellow card) 88'; Tercero (red card) 90+3'	Stadium: Estadio Ciudad de los Deportes; Attendance: 25,755; Referee: Marco Antonio Ortiz Nava

21 February 2024 8	León	2–3	Cruz Azul	León
21:00 CT	Frías (yellow card) 44'; Medina 90+12'; Alvarado 90+26'; Guerra (yellow card) 90+36'	Report	Rodríguez 29'; Huescas 38'; Salcedo (yellow card) 90+1'; Zaleta (yellow card) 90+14'; Antuna 90+15'; Guerrero (yellow card) 90+34'	Stadium: Estadio León; Attendance: 24,618; Referee: Diego Montaño Robles

24 February 2024 9	América	1–0	Cruz Azul	Mexico City
21:10 CT	Quiñones 4'	Report	Rodríguez (yellow card) 40'; Salcedo (yellow card) 45+7'; Piovi (yellow card) 72'	Stadium: Estadio Azteca; Attendance: 59,032; Referee: Oscar Mejía García

2 March 2024 10	Cruz Azul	3–0	Guadalajara	Mexico City
19:05 CT	Faravelli 7'; Antuna 27', 33'	Report	González (yellow card) 78'; Briseño (yellow card) 81'	Stadium: Estadio Azteca; Attendance: 67,623; Referee: César Arturo Ramos Palazuelos

9 March 2024 11	Santos Laguna	3–0	Cruz Azul	Torreón
19:00 CT	Dória (yellow card) 9'; Medina 36'; Mariscal (yellow card) 55'; Fagúndez 69', (yellow card) 79' (yellow-red card) 80'; Muñoz 83', (yellow card) 84'	Report	Gutiérrez (yellow card) 6'; Lira (yellow card) 45+1'; Ditta (red card) 59'; Gamboa (yellow card) 73'; Huescas (yellow card) 90+5'	Stadium: Estadio Corona; Attendance: 22,007; Referee: Adonai Gonzalez

16 March 2024 12	Cruz Azul	1–2	Necaxa	Mexico City
17:00 CT	Rotondi 9', (yellow card) 90+6'; Lira (yellow card) 61'; Faravelli (yellow card) 76'; Rivero (yellow card) 90+2'	Report	Cambindo 12'; Paradela 28'; Peña (yellow card) 52'; Garnica (yellow card) 90+6'	Stadium: Estadio Ciudad de los Deportes; Attendance: 25,580; Referee: Fernando Guerrero Ramírez

30 March 2024 13	UNAM	0–0	Cruz Azul	Mexico City
21:05 CT	Rivas (yellow card) 70'; Monroy (yellow card) 84'	Report	Cándido (yellow card) 70'; Faravelli (yellow card) 90'	Stadium: Estadio Olímpico Universitario; Attendance: 41,121; Referee: Fernando Hernández Gómez

6 April 2024 14	Cruz Azul	2–1	Monterrey	Mexico City
21:05 CT	Rivero (yellow card) 45+2'; Antuna 49', 70'; Huescas (yellow card) 83'	Report	Govea (yellow card) 28'; López 67'; Vegas (yellow card) 70'; Guiterrez (yellow card) 81'; Andrada (yellow card) 90+5'	Stadium: Estadio Ciudad de los Deportes; Attendance: 13,585; Referee: Marco Antonio Ortiz Nava

12 April 2024 15	Puebla	0–1	Cruz Azul	Puebla
21:00 CT	González (yellow card) 45'; Cavallini (yellow card) 58'; Herrera (yellow card) 72'; Olmedo (yellow card) 90+2'; Navarro (yellow card) 90+2'	Report	Antuna 90+4' (pen.)	Stadium: Estadio Cuauhtémoc; Attendance: 31,289; Referee: Katia Itzel García

21 April 2024 16	Cruz Azul	2–2	Atlas	Mexico City
18:00 CT	Mier (yellow card) 11'; Rivero 40'; Ditta (yellow card) 44'; Cándido 71'	Report	Aguirre 13' (pen.); Murillo (yellow card) 20'; Márquez 38'	Stadium: Estadio Ciudad de los Deportes; Attendance: 20,543; Referee: Luis Enrique Santander Aguirre

27 April 2024 17	Toluca	0–1	Cruz Azul	Toluca
19:00 CT		Report	Ditta 18'; Rodríguez (yellow card) 71'; Cándido (yellow card) 73'	Stadium: Estadio Nemesio Díez; Attendance: 27,273; Referee: Fernando Guerrero Ramírez

===== Final phase =====
====== Quarter-finals ======
9 May 2024 First leg	UNAM	0–2	Cruz Azul	Mexico City
18:00 CT	Mori (yellow card) 64'; Suárez (yellow card) 81'	Report	Rivero 26', (yellow card) 31'; Faravelli 57'; Rodríguez (yellow card) 80'	Stadium: Estadio Olímpico Universitario; Attendance: 40,418; Referee: Luis Enrique Santander Aguirre

12 May 2024 Second leg	Cruz Azul	2–2 (4–2 agg.)	UNAM	Mexico City
19:00 CT	Piovi (yellow card) 32'; Rivero (yellow card) 36'; Gutiérrez 76'; Faravelli 90+1'	Report	Martínez (yellow card) 36', (goal) 51'; Silva (yellow card) 48' (yellow-red card) 81'; Salvio (yellow card) 58'; Huerta 85'; López (yellow card) 90'	Stadium: Estadio Ciudad de los Deportes; Attendance: 27,228; Referee: Daniel Quintero Huitrón

====== Semi-finals ======
16 May 2024 First leg	Monterrey	0–1	Cruz Azul	Guadalupe
21:00 CT	Arteaga (yellow card) 90+6'	Report	Rotondi 34'; Rivero (yellow card) 86'	Stadium: Estadio BBVA; Attendance: 51,708; Referee: Daniel Quintero Huitrón

19 May 2024 Second leg	Cruz Azul	1–2 (2 (s)–2 agg.)	Monterrey	Mexico City
18:00 CT	Salcedo (yellow card) 45'; Sepúlveda 61'	Report	Medina (yellow card) 40'; Canales (yellow card) 45+2'; Berterame 67', 73'; Aguirre (yellow card) 90+3'	Stadium: Estadio Ciudad de los Deportes; Attendance: 28,403; Referee: Fernando Guerrero Ramírez

====== Final ======
23 May 2024 First leg	Cruz Azul	1–1	América	Mexico City
20:00 CT	Antuna 9' (pen.)	Report	Quiñones 16'	Stadium: Estadio Ciudad de los Deportes; Attendance: 27,244; Referee: Fernando Hernández Gómez

26 May 2024 Second leg	América	1–0 (2–1 agg.)	Cruz Azul	Mexico City
19:00 CT	Reyes (yellow card) 59'; Martín 78' (pen.), (yellow card) 79'; Quiñones (yellow card) 80'	Report	Rotondi (yellow card) 38'	Stadium: Estadio Azteca; Attendance: 73,604; Referee: Marco Antonio Ortiz Nava

=== Leagues Cup ===
==== Group stage ====
Pos	Team	Pld	W	PW	PL	L	GF	GA	GD	Pts	Qualification	MIA	CAZ	ATL
1	(United States) Inter Miami CF	2	2	0	0	0	6	1	+5	6	Advance to knockout stage	—	—	4–0
2	(Mexico) Cruz Azul	2	0	1	0	1	2	3	−1	2	Advance to knockout stage	1–2	—	1–1
3	(United States) Atlanta United FC	2	0	0	1	1	1	5	−4	1		—	—	—

Source: Leagues Cup
Rules for classification: Tiebreakers

21 July 2023 1	Cruz Azul (Mexico)	1–2	(United States) Inter Miami CF	Fort Lauderdale, United States
20:00 EDT	Antuna 54'; Dueñas (yellow card) 90+2'	Report	Arroyo (yellow card) 38'; Taylor 44'; Messi 90+4'	Stadium: DRV PNK; Attendance: 20,512; Referee: Saíd Martínez (Honduras)

29 July 2023 3	Cruz Azul (Mexico)	1–1 (5–4 p)	(United States) Atlanta United FC	Atlanta, United States
19:00 EDT	Dueñas (yellow card) 7'; Moisés 20'; Salcedo (yellow card) 90'; Escobar (yellow card) 90+1'	Report	Lennon (yellow card) 6'; Sejdić (yellow card) 27'; Hernández (yellow card) 42'; Muyumba (yellow card) 53'; Almada 75'; Giakoumakis (yellow card) 90+2'	Stadium: Mercedes-Benz; Attendance: 41,108; Referee: Oliver Vergara (Panama)
	Penalties
	Salcedo (penalty missed); Rivero (penalty scored); Tabó (penalty scored); Rotondi (penalty scored); Autuna (penalty scored); Lotti (penalty scored)		(penalty scored) Lennon; (penalty scored) Muyumba; (penalty missed) Berry; (penalty scored) Almada; (penalty scored) Giakoumakis; (penalty missed) Purata

==== Knockout phase ====
===== Round of 32 =====
3 August 2023	Charlotte FC (United States)	0−0 (4−3 p)	(Mexico) Cruz Azul	Frisco, United States
19:30 UTC−5	Byrne (yellow card) 15'	Report	Antuna (yellow card) 60'; Ditta (yellow card) 74'	Stadium: Toyota; Attendance: 6,844; Referee: Ismael Cornejo Meléndez (El Salvador)
	Penalties
	Swiderski (penalty missed); Bender (penalty scored); Jones (penalty scored); Westwood (penalty missed); Vargas (penalty scored); Privett (penalty scored)		(penalty scored) Rivero; (penalty missed) Antuna; (penalty missed) Rotondi; (penalty scored) Dueñas; (penalty scored) Rodríguez; (penalty missed) Castaño
Note: Match played at neutral site due to scheduling conflicts at Charlotte FC's home stadium Bank of America Stadium and a lack of approved venues in the Charlotte metropolitan area.

== Squad statistics ==
As of match played 26 May 2024

=== Appearances ===
Players with no appearances are not included on the list.

No.	Pos	Nat	Player	Total		Liga MX Apertura		Liga MX Clausura		Leagues Cup	
No.	Pos	Nat	Player	Apps	Goals	Apps	Goals	Apps	Goals	Apps	Goals
Goalkeepers
1	GK	(Mexico) MEX	Andrés Gudiño	16	0	13+1	0	0+0	0	2+0	0
23	GK	(Colombia) COL	Kevin Mier	23	0	0+0	0	23+0	0	0+0	0
Defenders
2	DF	(Mexico) MEX	Rafael Guerrero	13	0	3+7	0	0+2	0	1+0	0
3	DF	(Mexico) MEX	Carlos Salcedo	36	0	15+0	0	12+6	0	3+0	0
4	DF	(Colombia) COL	Willer Ditta	35	2	15+0	1	18+0	1	2+0	0
13	DF	(Uruguay) URU	Camilo Cándido	22	1	0+0	0	8+14	1	0+0	0
26	DF	(Mexico) MEX	Carlos Vargas	4	0	0+0	0	1+3	0	0+0	0
31	DF	(Mexico) MEX	Luis Iturbide	1	0	1+0	0	0+0	0	0+0	0
33	DF	(Argentina) ARG	Gonzalo Piovi	23	0	0+0	0	23+0	0	0+0	0
191	DF	(Mexico) MEX	Raymundo Rubio (Note: Player registered with the under-23 team.)	1	0	0+1	0	0+0	0	0+0	0
205	DF	(Mexico) MEX	Josué Díaz	1	0	0+1	0	0+0	0	0+0	0
229	DF	(Mexico) MEX	Alan Zubiri	1	0	1+0	0	0+0	0	0+0	0
Midfielders
6	MF	(Mexico) MEX	Érik Lira	36	0	13+0	0	13+9	0	0+1	0
7	MF	(Mexico) MEX	Uriel Antuna	40	15	14+0	5	23+0	9	3+0	1
8	MF	(Argentina) ARG	Lorenzo Faravelli	23	3	0+0	0	23+0	3	0+0	0
14	MF	(Mexico) MEX	Alexis Gutiérrez	32	1	2+7	0	11+12	1	0+0	0
15	MF	(Uruguay) URU	Ignacio Rivero	40	4	13+2	1	18+4	3	3+0	0
18	MF	(Mexico) MEX	Rodrigo Huescas	40	2	13+3	0	15+8	2	1+0	0
19	MF	(Mexico) MEX	Carlos Rodríguez	39	1	13+0	0	23+0	1	3+0	0
29	MF	(Argentina) ARG	Carlos Rotondi	41	6	14+1	3	22+1	3	3+0	0
32	MF	(Mexico) MEX	Cristian Jiménez	2	0	1+1	0	0+0	0	0+0	0
194	MF	(Mexico) MEX	Amaury Morales	8	0	0+2	0	0+6	0	0+0	0
204	MF	(Mexico) MEX	Mauro Zaleta	4	0	0+0	0	0+4	0	0+0	0
Forwards
9	FW	(Mexico) MEX	Ángel Sepúlveda	33	9	7+3	6	15+8	3	0+0	0
27	FW	(Uruguay) URU	Gabriel Fernández	6	2	0+0	0	6+0	2	0+0	0
210	FW	(Mexico) MEX	Bryan Gamboa	7	0	0+0	0	0+7	0	0+0	0
268	FW	(Mexico) MEX	Mateo Levy	12	0	0+0	0	0+12	0	0+0	0
Player(s) transferred out during the season:
5	MF	(Colombia) COL	Kevin Castaño	15	0	9+4	0	0+0	0	0+2	0
8	MF	(Mexico) MEX	Jesús Dueñas	9	0	0+6	0	0+0	0	3+0	0
10	FW	(Brazil) BRA	Moisés	20	2	9+8	1	0+0	0	3+0	1
11	FW	(Uruguay) URU	Christian Tabó	8	0	3+3	0	0+0	0	0+2	0
17	MF	(Mexico) MEX	Alonso Escoboza	4	0	0+4	0	0+0	0	0+0	0
21	FW	(Argentina) ARG	Augusto Lotti	6	0	1+2	0	0+0	0	2+1	0
24	DF	(Paraguay) PAR	Juan Escobar	17	0	14+0	0	0+0	0	2+1	0
25	GK	(Mexico) MEX	Sebastián Jurado	5	0	4+0	0	0+0	0	1+0	0
28	FW	(Colombia) COL	Diber Cambindo	18	4	9+7	4	0+0	0	1+1	0

Source: Competitions

=== Goalscorers ===
Includes all competitive matches.

As of match played 26 May 2024

Rank	Pos.	No.	Player	Liga MX Apertura	Liga MX Clausura	Leagues Cup	Total
1	MF	7	(Mexico) Uriel Antuna	5	9	1	15
2	FW	9	(Mexico) Ángel Sepúlveda	6	3	0	9
3	MF	29	(Argentina) Carlos Rotondi	3	3	0	6
4	FW	28	(Colombia) Diber Cambindo	4	0	0	4
4	MF	15	(Uruguay) Ignacio Rivero	1	3	0	4
6	MF	8	(Argentina) Lorenzo Faravelli	0	3	0	3
7	DF	4	(Colombia) Willer Ditta	1	1	0	2
7	FW	10	(Brazil) Moisés	1	0	1	2
7	MF	18	(Mexico) Rodrigo Huescas	0	2	0	2
7	FW	27	(Uruguay) Gabriel Fernández	0	2	0	2
11	DF	13	(Uruguay) Camilo Cándido	0	1	0	1
11	MF	14	(Mexico) Alexis Gutiérrez	0	1	0	1
11	MF	19	(Mexico) Carlos Rodríguez	0	1	0	1
Own goals				0	1	0	1
Total				21	30	2	53

Sources: Soccerway, Liga MX

=== Clean sheets ===
No.	Player	Liga MX Apertura	Liga MX Clausura	Leagues Cup	Total
1	(Mexico) Andrés Gudiño	2	0	1	3
23	(Colombia) Kevin Mier	0	10	0	10
Total		2	10	1	13

=== Disciplinary record ===
As of match played 26 May 2024

No.	Pos.	Nat.	Player	Liga MX Apertura			Liga MX Clausura			Leagues Cup			Total		
No.	Pos.	Nat.	Player	Yellow card	(yellow card) (yellow-red card)	Red card	Yellow card	(yellow card) (yellow-red card)	Red card	Yellow card	(yellow card) (yellow-red card)	Red card	Yellow card	(yellow card) (yellow-red card)	Red card
1	GK	(Mexico)	Andrés Gudiño	3	0	0	0	0	0	0	0	0	3	0	0
2	DF	(Mexico)	Rafael Guerrero	4	0	0	2	0	0	0	0	0	6	0	0
3	DF	(Mexico)	Carlos Salcedo	4	0	0	3	0	0	1	0	0	8	0	0
4	DF	(Colombia)	Willer Ditta	4	0	0	3	1	1	1	0	0	8	1	1
5	DF	(Colombia)	Kevin Castaño	2	0	0	0	0	0	0	0	0	2	0	0
6	MF	(Mexico)	Érik Lira	0	0	0	3	0	0	0	0	0	3	0	0
7	MF	(Mexico)	Uriel Antuna	2	0	0	2	0	0	1	0	0	5	0	0
8	MF	(Argentina)	Lorenzo Faravelli	0	0	0	4	0	0	0	0	0	4	0	0
8	MF	(Mexico)	Jesús Dueñas	0	0	0	0	0	0	2	0	0	2	0	0
9	FW	(Mexico)	Ángel Sepúlveda	2	0	0	1	0	0	0	0	0	3	0	0
13	DF	(Uruguay)	Camilo Cándido	0	0	0	2	0	0	0	0	0	2	0	0
14	MF	(Mexico)	Alexis Gutiérrez	0	0	0	1	0	0	0	0	0	1	0	0
15	MF	(Uruguay)	Ignacio Rivero	5	0	0	7	0	0	0	0	0	12	0	0
18	MF	(Mexico)	Rodrigo Huescas	2	0	0	2	0	0	0	0	0	4	0	0
19	MF	(Mexico)	Carlos Rodríguez	3	0	1	5	0	0	0	0	0	8	0	1
23	GK	(Colombia)	Kevin Mier	0	0	0	1	0	0	0	0	0	1	0	0
24	DF	(Paraguay)	Juan Escobar	7	0	0	0	0	0	1	0	0	8	0	0
25	GK	(Mexico)	Sebastián Jurado	1	0	1	0	0	0	0	0	0	1	0	1
27	FW	(Uruguay)	Gabriel Fernández	0	0	0	1	0	0	0	0	0	1	0	0
28	FW	(Colombia)	Diber Cambindo	4	0	0	0	0	0	0	0	0	4	0	0
29	FW	(Argentina)	Carlos Rotondi	5	0	0	2	0	0	0	0	0	7	0	0
31	DF	(Mexico)	Luis Iturbide	1	0	0	0	0	0	0	0	0	1	0	0
32	DF	(Mexico)	Cristian Jiménez	1	0	0	0	0	0	0	0	0	1	0	0
33	DF	(Argentina)	Gonzalo Piovi	0	0	0	3	0	0	0	0	0	3	0	0
204	MF	(Mexico)	Mauro Zaleta	0	0	0	1	0	0	0	0	0	1	0	0
210	FW	(Mexico)	Bryan Gamboa	0	0	0	1	0	0	0	0	0	1	0	0
Total				50	0	2	44	1	1	6	0	0	100	1	3
