= 2026–27 Cruz Azul season =

100th season in existence of Cruz Azul

Cruz Azul
2026–27 season
- Owner: Cooperativa La Cruz Azul
- Sporting director: Iván Alonso
- Head coach: Joel Huiqui
- Stadium: Estadio Azteca
- Liga MX: Apertura: 1st Clausura: Pre-season
- Campeón de Campeones: Winners
- Leagues Cup: League phase
- Campeones Cup: Runners-up
- CONCACAF Champions Cup: Round of 16
- Top goalscorer: League: Nicolás Ibáñez; Andrés Montaño (6 each); All: Nicolás Ibáñez; José Paradela (7 each)
- Highest home attendance: 53,136 (v. Atlante, Liga MX Apertura, 1 August 2026)
- Lowest home attendance: 10,478 (v. Santos Laguna, Liga MX Apertura, 6 September 2026)
- Average home league attendance: 33,114
- Biggest win: 5–0 v. Juárez (H); Liga MX Apertura, 17 October 2026
- Biggest defeat: 0–2 v. Atlas (H); Liga MX Apertura, 22 August 2026; 0–2 v. Inter Miami CF (A); Campeones Cup, 16 September 2026

The 2026–27 season is Club de Futbol Cruz Azul's 100th season in their history and their 62nd consecutive season in the top flight of Mexican football. In addition to the domestic league, the club would also participate in the Campeón de Campeones, the Leagues Cup, the Campeones Cup, and the CONCACAF Champions Cup.

== First-team squad ==
As of 19 November 2026

No.	Player	Nationality	Date of birth (age)	Since	Signed from	Apps	Goals	Assists
Goalkeepers
1	Andrés Gudiño (4th captain)	(Mexico)	26 January 1997 (age 29)	2019	(Mexico) Venados	54	0	0
13	Ricardo Rodríguez	(Mexico)	15 March 2001 (age 25)	2026	(Mexico) Mazatlán	0	0	0
23	Kevin Mier	(Colombia)	18 May 2000 (age 26)	2024	(Colombia) Atlético Nacional	122	0	0
30	Emmanuel Ochoa	(Mexico)	5 May 2005 (age 21)	2025	(United States) San Jose Earthquakes	2	0	0
Defenders
2	Alan Mozo	(Mexico)	5 April 1997 (age 29)	2026	(Mexico) Guadalajara	8	0	2
3	Omar Campos	(Mexico)	20 July 2002 (age 24)	2025	(United States) Los Angeles FC	78	3	5
4	Willer Ditta (3rd captain)	(Colombia)	23 January 1997 (age 29)	2023	(Argentina) Newell's Old Boys	155	5	3
5	Jesús Orozco	(Mexico)	19 February 2002 (age 24)	2025	(Mexico) Guadalajara	62	2	2
12	Alán Montes	(Mexico)	26 October 2000 (age 26)	2026	(Mexico) Necaxa	4	0	0
15	Ralph Orquin	(United States)	15 April 2003 (age 23)	2026	(Mexico) América	0	0	0
22	Jorge Rodarte	(Mexico)	23 April 2004 (age 22)	2025	(Mexico) Zacatecas	23	1	2
28	Raymundo Rubio	(Mexico)	13 February 2001 (age 25)	2023	(Mexico) Cruz Azul Academy	1	0	0
33	Gonzalo Piovi	(Argentina)	8 September 1994 (age 32)	2024	(Argentina) Racing Club	131	1	7
Midfielders
6	Érik Lira (captain)	(Mexico)	8 May 2000 (age 26)	2022	(Mexico) Pumas UNAM	213	3	3
8	Agustín Palavecino	(Argentina)	9 November 1996 (age 30)	2026	(Mexico) Necaxa	47	11	4
10	Andrés Montaño	(Mexico)	22 May 2002 (age 24)	2024	(Mexico) Mazatlán	68	13	8
16	Jeremy Márquez	(Mexico)	21 June 2000 (age 26)	2025	(Mexico) Atlas	68	9	4
17	Amaury García	(Mexico)	19 December 2001 (age 24)	2024	(Mexico) Pumas UNAM	47	0	0
18	Luka Romero	(Argentina)	18 November 2004 (age 22)	2025	(Italy) AC Milan	88	10	5
19	Carlos Rodríguez (vice-captain)	(Mexico)	3 January 1997 (age 29)	2022	(Mexico) Monterrey	221	18	34
20	José Paradela	(Argentina)	15 December 1998 (age 27)	2025	(Mexico) Necaxa	71	19	17
25	Fernando Sámano	(Mexico)	4 September 2002 (age 24)	2025	(Mexico) Cruz Azul Academy	0	0	0
29	Carlos Rotondi	(Argentina)	2 March 1997 (age 29)	2022	(Argentina) Defensa y Justicia	178	30	26
32	Cristian Jiménez	(Mexico)	18 July 2002 (age 24)	2021	(Mexico) Cruz Azul Academy	10	0	0
Forwards
7	Nicolás Ibáñez	(Argentina)	23 August 1994 (age 32)	2026	(Mexico) Tigres UANL	33	11	4
11	Christian Ebere	(Nigeria)	4 April 1998 (age 28)	2026	(Uruguay) Nacional	34	7	1
14	Juan José Calero	(Colombia)	5 November 1998 (age 28)	2026	(Mexico) Venados	2	0	0
21	Gabriel Fernández	(Uruguay)	13 May 1994 (age 32)	2024	(Mexico) Pumas UNAM	97	29	11
27	Bryan Gamboa	(Mexico)	13 March 2002 (age 24)	2025	(Mexico) Cruz Azul Academy	13	1	0
Out on loan
–	Mauro Zaleta	(Mexico)	2 April 2002 (age 24)	2022	(Mexico) Cruz Azul Academy	5	0	0

=== New contracts ===
Date	Pos.	No.	Player	Until	Ref.
First team
25 September 2026	MF	17	(Mexico) Amaury García	30 June 2030	
19 November 2026	DF	4	(Colombia) Willer Ditta	31 December 2029	
Academy

== Transfers ==
=== In ===
Date	Pos.	No.	Player	From	Fee	Ref.
16 July 2026	FW	14	(Colombia) Juan José Calero	(Mexico) Venados	Free transfer	
16 July 2026	DF	12	(Mexico) Alán Montes	(Mexico) Necaxa	Free transfer	
28 August 2026	GK	13	(Mexico) Ricardo Rodríguez	(Mexico) Mazatlán	Free transfer	
10 September 2026	DF	15	(United States) Ralph Orquin	(Mexico) América	Free transfer	
▼ Spending: $0

=== Out ===
Date	Pos.	No.	Player	To	Fee	Ref.
12 July 2026	FW	–	(Greece) Giorgos Giakoumakis	(United Arab Emirates) Al Ain	$5,200,000	
▲ Income: $5,200,000

=== Loans in ===
Date	Pos.	No.	Player	From	Date until	Ref.
2 September 2026	DF	2	(Mexico) Alan Mozo	(Mexico) Guadalajara	End of season	

=== Loans out ===
Date	Pos.	No.	Player	To	Date until	Ref.
2 July 2026	DF	–	(Mexico) Mauro Zaleta	(Mexico) Necaxa	End of season	

== Pre-season and friendlies ==
On 15 June 2026, Cruz Azul announced a friendly match against Atlético Morelia held in Morelia, Michoacán. Two weeks later, the club announced a second friendly against Comunicaciones in Ciudad Cooperativa Cruz Azul, Hidalgo. On 4 September, Cruz Azul would return to the United States to play a friendly match against América in San Diego, California. Four days later, a second friendly was confirmed against LA Galaxy in Carson, California.

Win Draw Loss Fixtures

4 July 2026 Friendly	Atlético Morelia	3–3	Cruz Azul	Morelia, Mexico
19:30 CST	Mendoza 68' (o.g.); del Campo 72'; Botello 78'	Report	Ebere 11'; Romero 23'; Levy 66'	Stadium: Estadio Morelos

11 July 2026 Copa Fundadores	Cruz Azul	6–0	Comunicaciones	Ciudad Cooperativa Cruz Azul, Mexico
13:00 CST	Ebere 1', 3'; Rodríguez 6'; Espino 9' (o.g.); Romero 26', 66'	Report		Stadium: Estadio Refundación

1 October 2026 Friendly	América	0–0	Cruz Azul	San Diego, United States
19:30 PDT	Zendejas (yellow card) 26'; Ramos Mingo (yellow card) 39'; Cerrillo (yellow card) 77'	Report	Orozco (yellow card) 30'	Stadium: Snapdragon Stadium; Referee: Timothy Ford (United States)

4 October 2026 Friendly	LA Galaxy	1–2	Cruz Azul	Carson, United States
18:00 PDT	Ruiz (yellow card) 32'; Paintsil 84'	Report	Orquin (yellow card) 6'; Romero 9'; Palavecino 28'	Stadium: Dignity Health Sports Park

== Competitions ==
=== Overall record ===
Competition	First match	Last match	Starting round	Final position	Record							
Competition	First match	Last match	Starting round	Final position	Pld	W	D	L	GF	GA	GD	Win %
Liga MX Apertura	17 July 2026	TBD	Matchday 1	TBD	16	10	2	4	37	26	+11	62.50
Liga MX Clausura	January 2027	TBD	Matchday 1	TBD	0	0	0	0	0	0	+0	—
Campeón de Campeones	25 July 2026		Final	Winners	1	1	0	0	3	1	+2	100.00
Leagues Cup	6 August 2026	13 August 2026	League phase	League phase	3	2	0	1	4	3	+1	66.67
Campeones Cup	16 September 2026		Final	Runners-up	1	0	0	1	0	2	−2	0.00
CONCACAF Champions Cup	March 2027	TBD	Round of 16	TBD	0	0	0	0	0	0	+0	—
Total					21	13	2	6	44	32	+12	61.90

Last updated: 7 November 2026
Source: Soccerway

=== Liga MX Apertura ===
==== League table ====
Pos	Team	Pld	W	D	L	GF	GA	GD	Pts	Qualification
1	Cruz Azul (Q)	16	10	2	4	37	26	+11	32	Qualification for the quarter–finals (Note: The first eight places in the table will qualify for the Liguilla quarter-finals.)
2	América (Q)	16	8	6	2	38	23	+15	30	Qualification for the quarter–finals
3	Guadalajara (Q)	16	8	6	2	26	15	+11	30	Qualification for the quarter–finals
4	Toluca (Q)	16	7	6	3	35	21	+14	27	Qualification for the quarter–finals
5	Atlas (Q)	16	8	3	5	27	30	−3	27	Qualification for the quarter–finals

Updated to match(es) played on 14 November 2026. Source: Liga MX
Rules for classification: 1) Points; 2) Goal difference; 3) Number of goals scored; 4) Head-to-head results between tied teams; 5) Number of goals scored away; 6) Highest relegation coefficient; 7) Fair Play points
(Q) Qualified for the phase indicated

==== Results summary ====
Overall								Home						Away					
Pld	W	D	L	GF	GA	GD	Pts	W	D	L	GF	GA	GD	W	D	L	GF	GA	GD
16	10	2	4	37	26	+11	32	5	1	2	19	13	+6	5	1	2	18	13	+5

Last updated: 7 November 2026.
Source: Soccerway

==== Results by round ====
Round	1	2	3	4	5	6	7	8	9	10	11	12	13	14	15	16	17
Ground	A	H	H	A	H	A	H	H	A	H	A	H	A	A	H	A	A
Result	W	W	L	L	L	W	W	W	L	D	D	W	W	W	W	W	
Position	4	2	6	10	12	10	6	4	4	7	7	5	3	2	3	1	
Points	3	6	6	6	6	9	12	15	15	16	17	20	23	26	29	32	

Source: Liga MX
A = Away; H = Home; W = Win; D = Draw; L = Loss; P = Postponed

==== Matches ====
The league fixtures were announced on 9 June 2026.

Win Draw Loss Fixtures

===== Regular phase =====
17 July 2026 1	Atlético San Luis	2–3	Cruz Azul	San Luis Potosí
19:00 CST	Llorente (yellow card) 14', (goal) 50'; Salles-Lamonge 46'; Bambu (yellow card) 75'	Report	Rodríguez (yellow card) 33'; Fernández 63' (pen.); Márquez 81', 90+3'	Stadium: Estadio Libertad Financiera; Attendance: 21,945; Referee: Adonai Escobedo González

21 July 2026 2	Cruz Azul	2–1	Puebla	Mexico City
19:00 CST	Romero (yellow card) 37', (goal) 44'; Ibáñez (yellow card) 45+2'; Ebere 82'	Report	Monárrez 28', (yellow card) 90+5'; Ramírez (yellow card) 84'; Mustre (yellow card) 90+1'	Stadium: Estadio Azteca; Attendance: 33,185; Referee: Karen Hernández Andrade

1 August 2026 3	Cruz Azul	2–3	Atlante	Mexico City
21:00 CST	Ibáñez 60'; Rodríguez (yellow card) 68'; Ditta (yellow card) 73'; Fernández (penalty missed) 90+3'; Palavecino 90+10'	Report	Calzadilla (yellow card) 15', (goal) 47'; Puente 44'; Julio 75' (pen.)	Stadium: Estadio Azteca; Attendance: 53,136; Referee: Abraham de Jesús Quirarte Contreras

16 August 2026 4	Tijuana	2–1	Cruz Azul	Tijuana
20:10 PDT	Rivero 44', (yellow card) 57'; Mora 54'; Preciado (yellow card) 56'	Report	Ibáñez 45+2'; Ebere (yellow card) 49'; Montes (yellow card) 61'; Márquez (yellow card) 74'; Paradela (yellow card) 80'	Stadium: Estadio Caliente; Attendance: 29,533; Referee: Víctor Alfonso Cáceres Hernández

22 August 2026 5	Cruz Azul	0–2	Atlas	Mexico City
21:00 CST		Report	Zaldívar 30'; Monzón 45'; Esteves (yellow card) 65'	Stadium: Estadio Azteca; Attendance: 20,683; Referee: Guillermo Pacheco Larios

28 August 2026 6	Necaxa	1–3	Cruz Azul	Aguascalientes
19:00 CST	Leyva (yellow card) 43'; Ruiz (yellow card) 67'; Rodríguez 83', (yellow card) 84'; Pedraza (yellow card) 90+4'; Torres (yellow card) 90+4'	Report	Márquez 23'; Ibáñez 46'; Ditta 53', (yellow card) 54'; García (yellow card) 59'	Stadium: Estadio Victoria; Attendance: 19,308; Referee: Ismael Rosario López Peñuelas

6 September 2026 7	Cruz Azul	1–0	Santos Laguna	Mexico City
17:00 CST	Paradela 89'	Report	López (yellow card) 50'	Stadium: Estadio Azteca; Attendance: 10,478; Referee: Maximiliano Quintero Hernández
Note: Fixture was initially scheduled for a 20:00 kick-off.

12 September 2026 8	Cruz Azul	4–3	América	Mexico City
21:15 CST	Lira 19', (yellow card) 60'; Paradela 35', (yellow card) 90+3'; Ibáñez (penalty missed) 43', (yellow card) 45+6'; Orozco 45', (yellow card) 45+6'; Márquez (yellow card) 63'; Fernández 72'	Report	Cervantes (yellow card) 45+6'; Veiga (yellow card) 45+6'; Rodríguez 52'; Perea 90'; Borja 90'	Stadium: Estadio Azteca; Attendance: 40,430; Referee: Luis Enrique Santander Aguirre

19 September 2026 9	Monterrey	1–0	Cruz Azul	Guadalupe
19:10 CST	Garza 7', (yellow card) 58'	Report	Fernández (yellow card) 58'; Piovi (yellow card) 60'	Stadium: Estadio BBVA; Attendance: 47,541; Referee: Jesus Rafael Lopez Valle

26 September 2026 10	Cruz Azul	3–3	Toluca	Mexico City
16:50 CST	Ibáñez 7'; Fernández 38', 90+5'; Palavecino (yellow card) 45+2'; Ditta (yellow card) 52'; Piovi (yellow card) 57'; Montaño (yellow card) 90+9'	Report	Barbosa (yellow card) 37'; Helinho 55' (pen.); Vega 56', 78'	Stadium: Estadio Azteca; Attendance: 34,239; Referee: Katia Itzel García Mendoza
Note: Fixture was initially scheduled for a 17:00 kick-off.

11 October 2026 11	Pumas UNAM	3–3	Cruz Azul	Mexico City
19:15 CST	Juninho 10'; Huerta 16', (yellow card) 26' (yellow-red card) 37'; Morales 49'	Report	Palavecino (yellow card) 30', (goal) 45+3'; Montaño 64'; Ebere 85'	Stadium: Estadio Olímpico Universitario; Attendance: 25,580; Referee: Ismael Rosario López Peñuelas

17 October 2026 12	Cruz Azul	5–0	Juárez	Mexico City
21:10 CST	Montaño 4'; Rodríguez 23'; Campos 45+3'; Palavecino 55'; González 75'; Fernández (yellow card) 89'	Report	Nevárez (yellow card) 28'; Castilho (yellow card) 51'; Madson (yellow card) 51'; Sepúlveda (yellow card) 89'	Stadium: Estadio Azteca; Attendance: 32,309; Referee: Salvador Pérez Villalobos

21 October 2026 13	Pachuca	1–2	Cruz Azul	Pachuca
21:10 CST	Bauermann (yellow card) 11'; Venegas 20', (yellow card) 48'; Idrissi (yellow card) 45'; Pizarro (yellow card) 63'; Budib (yellow card) 75'	Report	Fernández 13'; Rodríguez (yellow card) 39'; Montaño 79' (pen.); García (yellow card) 85'; Romero (yellow card) 90+4'	Stadium: Estadio Hidalgo; Attendance: 20,472; Referee: Daniel Quintero Huitrón

25 October 2026 14	Querétaro	1–3	Cruz Azul	Querétaro
19:00 CST	Coronel (yellow card) 27', (goal) 33'	Report	García (yellow card) 4'; Montaño 19' (pen.); Ibáñez 44'; Ebere 45+2'	Stadium: Estadio Corregidora; Attendance: 29,279; Referee: César Arturo Ramos Palazuelos

1 November 2026 15	Cruz Azul	2–1	León	Mexico City
19:10 CST	Fernández (yellow card) 33'; Montaño 56' (pen.); Orozco (yellow card) 60'; Paradela 72', (yellow card) 90+3'; Márquez (yellow card) 85'	Report	Romaña (yellow card) 34'; Mora (yellow card) 45+7'; Guerra (yellow card) 55'; Rodríguez (yellow card) 55'; Espinosa (yellow card) 79'; Alvarado 90+10' (pen.)	Stadium: Estadio Azteca; Attendance: 40,452; Referee: Jesus Rafael Lopez Valle

7 November 2026 16	Tigres UANL	2–3	Cruz Azul	San Nicolás de los Garza
19:00 CST	Lainez (yellow card) 37'; Brunetta 39', (yellow card) 51'; Martínez 65'; Gorriarán (yellow card) 81'	Report	Ibáñez 24'; Paradela (yellow card) 29'; Lira (yellow card) 34'; Montaño 51' (pen.); Rotondi (yellow card) 75', (goal) 78'; Orozco (yellow card) 90+5'	Stadium: Estadio Universitario; Attendance: 30,167; Referee: Ismael Rosario López Peñuelas
Note: Fixture was initially scheduled for a 17:00 kick-off, but was moved for live Azteca Deportes broadcast.

22 November 2026 17	Guadalajara	v	Cruz Azul	Zapopan
17:07 CST		Report		Stadium: Estadio Akron; Referee: Daniel Quintero Huitrón

=== Liga MX Clausura ===
==== Results summary ====
Overall								Home						Away					
Pld	W	D	L	GF	GA	GD	Pts	W	D	L	GF	GA	GD	W	D	L	GF	GA	GD
0	0	0	0	0	0	0	0	0	0	0	0	0	0	0	0	0	0	0	0

Last updated: pre-season.
Source: Soccerway

==== Results by round ====
Round	1
Ground	
Result	
Position	
Points	

Source: Liga MX
A = Away; H = Home; W = Win; D = Draw; L = Loss; P = Postponed

==== Matches ====
The league fixtures will be released in December 2026.

Win Draw Loss Fixtures

===== Regular phase =====
January 2027 1	TBC	v	TBC
		Report

=== Campeón de Campeones ===
As the defending Liga MX Clausura 2026 champions, Cruz Azul faced the reigning Liga MX Apertura 2025 winners Toluca in the Campeón de Campeones.

Win Draw Loss Fixtures

25 July 2026 Final	Toluca	1–3	Cruz Azul	Carson, United States
18:00 PDT	Vega 45+3'	Report	Paradela 31', 61'; Palavecino (yellow card) 43'; Rodríguez 55'; Orozco (yellow card) 90+3'	Stadium: Dignity Health Sports Park; Referee: Luis Enrique Santander Aguirre (Guanajuato)

=== Leagues Cup ===
As a Liga MX side, Cruz Azul entered the Leagues Cup in the league phase.

==== League phase ====
Pos	Team	Pld	W	PW	PL	L	GF	GA	GD	Pts	Qualification
3	Toluca	3	2	0	0	1	6	2	+4	6	Advance to knockout stage
4	Monterrey	3	2	0	0	1	5	4	+1	6	Advance to knockout stage
5	Cruz Azul	3	2	0	0	1	4	3	+1	6	
6	Juárez	3	2	0	0	1	5	5	0	6	
7	Tigres UANL	3	0	3	0	0	2	2	0	6	

Source: Leagues Cup

Round	1	2	3
Ground	N	N	N
Result	W	W	L
Position	5	3	5
Points	3	6	6

Source: Leagues Cup
A = Away; N = Neutral; W = Win; D = Draw; L = Loss

Win Draw Loss Fixtures

6 August 2026 1	Cruz Azul (Mexico)	1–0	(United States) Philadelphia Union	Chester, United States
20:00 EDT	Paradela 3', (yellow card) 10'; Lira (yellow card) 53'	Report	Bueno (yellow card) 23'	Stadium: Subaru Park; Attendance: 14,958; Referee: Juan Gabriel Calderón (Costa Rica)

9 August 2026 2	Cruz Azul (Mexico)	2–1	(United States) New York City FC	Harrison, United States
19:30 EDT	Palavecino 35'; Piovi (yellow card) 53'; Paradela 78'	Report	Freese (yellow card) 36'; Cavallo (yellow card) 37'; Murray 45+1'; Gray (yellow card) 51'; Fernández (yellow card) 83'; Jones (yellow card) 90+5'	Stadium: Sports Illustrated Stadium; Attendance: 20,969; Referee: Jesús López (Mexico)

13 August 2026 3	Cruz Azul (Mexico)	1–2	(United States) Chicago Fire FC	Bridgeview, United States
20:00 CDT	Ditta (yellow card) 17'; Ibáñez 81'	Report	Dithejane (yellow card) 31', (goal) 67', 90+3'; Pineda (yellow card) 88'	Stadium: SeatGeek Stadium; Attendance: 18,567; Referee: Pierre-Luc Lauzière (Canada)

=== Campeones Cup ===
As the defending Campeón de Campeones champions, Cruz Azul faced the reigning MLS Cup winners Inter Miami CF in the Campeones Cup.

Win Draw Loss Fixtures

16 September 2026 Final	Inter Miami CF (United States)	2–0	(Mexico) Cruz Azul	Miami, United States
20:00 EDT	Messi 24'; Galarza (yellow card) 41'; Casemiro 81'; Shaw (yellow card) 90'	Report	Ditta (yellow card) 66'; Fernández (yellow card) 73'	Stadium: Nu Stadium; Attendance: 26,495; Referee: Keylor Herrera (Costa Rica)

=== CONCACAF Champions Cup ===
As the reigning champions in Liga MX, Cruz Azul entered the CONCACAF Champions Cup in the round of 16.

==== Round of 16 ====
First leg	TBC	v	Cruz Azul
		Report

Second leg	Cruz Azul	v	TBC	Mexico City, Mexico
		Report		Stadium: Estadio Azteca

== Statistics ==
As of match played 7 November 2026

=== Appearances ===
Players with no appearances are not included on the list.

No.	Pos	Nat	Player	Total		Liga MX Apertura		Liga MX Clausura		Campeón de Campeones		Leagues Cup		Campeones Cup		Champions Cup	
No.	Pos	Nat	Player	Apps	Goals	Apps	Goals	Apps	Goals	Apps	Goals	Apps	Goals	Apps	Goals	Apps	Goals
1	GK	(Mexico) MEX	Andrés Gudiño	5	0	5+0	0	0+0	0	0+0	0	0+0	0	0+0	0	0+0	0
2	DF	(Mexico) MEX	Alan Mozo	8	0	3+4	0	0+0	0	0+0	0	0+0	0	0+1	0	0+0	0
3	DF	(Mexico) MEX	Omar Campos	21	1	15+1	1	0+0	0	0+1	0	3+0	0	0+1	0	0+0	0
4	DF	(Colombia) COL	Willer Ditta	16	1	9+2	1	0+0	0	1+0	0	3+0	0	1+0	0	0+0	0
5	DF	(Mexico) MEX	Jesús Orozco	19	1	13+1	1	0+0	0	1+0	0	3+0	0	1+0	0	0+0	0
6	MF	(Mexico) MEX	Érik Lira	18	1	11+2	1	0+0	0	1+0	0	3+0	0	1+0	0	0+0	0
7	FW	(Argentina) ARG	Nicolás Ibáñez	20	7	12+3	6	0+0	0	0+1	0	0+3	1	1+0	0	0+0	0
8	MF	(Argentina) ARG	Agustín Palavecino	20	4	13+2	3	0+0	0	1+0	0	3+0	1	1+0	0	0+0	0
10	MF	(Mexico) MEX	Andrés Montaño	13	6	6+6	6	0+0	0	0+1	0	0+0	0	0+0	0	0+0	0
11	FW	(Nigeria) NGR	Christian Ebere	15	3	5+8	3	0+0	0	0+1	0	0+0	0	0+1	0	0+0	0
12	DF	(Mexico) MEX	Alán Montes	4	0	3+1	0	0+0	0	0+0	0	0+0	0	0+0	0	0+0	0
14	FW	(Colombia) COL	Juan José Calero	2	0	0+2	0	0+0	0	0+0	0	0+0	0	0+0	0	0+0	0
16	MF	(Mexico) MEX	Jeremy Márquez	19	3	12+2	3	0+0	0	1+0	0	3+0	0	1+0	0	0+0	0
17	MF	(Mexico) MEX	Amaury García	12	0	7+4	0	0+0	0	0+0	0	0+0	0	1+0	0	0+0	0
18	MF	(Argentina) ARG	Luka Romero	19	1	5+10	1	0+0	0	0+1	0	0+3	0	0+0	0	0+0	0
19	MF	(Mexico) MEX	Carlos Rodríguez	21	2	13+3	1	0+0	0	1+0	1	3+0	0	1+0	0	0+0	0
20	MF	(Argentina) ARG	José Paradela	17	7	10+2	3	0+0	0	1+0	2	3+0	2	1+0	0	0+0	0
21	FW	(Uruguay) URU	Gabriel Fernández	19	5	6+8	5	0+0	0	1+0	0	3+0	0	0+1	0	0+0	0
22	DF	(Mexico) MEX	Jorge Rodarte	4	0	2+2	0	0+0	0	0+0	0	0+0	0	0+0	0	0+0	0
23	GK	(Colombia) COL	Kevin Mier	16	0	11+0	0	0+0	0	1+0	0	3+0	0	1+0	0	0+0	0
29	MF	(Argentina) ARG	Carlos Rotondi	9	1	2+5	1	0+0	0	1+0	0	0+0	0	1+0	0	0+0	0
32	MF	(Mexico) MEX	Cristian Jiménez	2	0	0+0	0	0+0	0	0+0	0	0+2	0	0+0	0	0+0	0
33	DF	(Argentina) ARG	Gonzalo Piovi	16	0	10+1	0	0+0	0	1+0	0	3+0	0	0+1	0	0+0	0
49	DF	(Mexico) MEX	Josué Díaz (Note: Player registered with Cruz Azul Hidalgo.)	2	0	0+1	0	0+0	0	0+0	0	0+1	0	0+0	0	0+0	0
55	MF	(Mexico) MEX	Rogelio González	9	1	3+6	1	0+0	0	0+0	0	0+0	0	0+0	0	0+0	0
60	MF	(Mexico) MEX	Ariel Castro	2	0	0+2	0	0+0	0	0+0	0	0+0	0	0+0	0	0+0	0
66	DF	(Venezuela) VEN	Javier Suarez	1	0	0+1	0	0+0	0	0+0	0	0+0	0	0+0	0	0+0	0
70	DF	(Mexico) MEX	Iván Silva	1	0	0+1	0	0+0	0	0+0	0	0+0	0	0+0	0	0+0	0
214	FW	(Mexico) MEX	Mateo Levy (Note: Player registered with the under-21 team.)	1	0	0+0	0	0+0	0	0+0	0	0+1	0	0+0	0	0+0	0
258	FW	(Mexico) MEX	Emiliano Castañeda (Note: Player registered with the under-19 team.)	1	0	0+1	0	0+0	0	0+0	0	0+0	0	0+0	0	0+0	0

=== Goals ===
Rank	Pos.	No.	Player	Liga MX Apertura	Liga MX Clausura	Campeón de Campeones	Leagues Cup	Campeones Cup	Champions Cup	Total
1	FW	7	(Argentina) Nicolás Ibáñez	6	0	0	1	0	0	7
1	MF	20	(Argentina) José Paradela	3	0	2	2	0	0	7
3	MF	10	(Mexico) Andrés Montaño	6	0	0	0	0	0	6
4	FW	21	(Uruguay) Gabriel Fernández	5	0	0	0	0	0	5
5	MF	8	(Argentina) Agustín Palavecino	3	0	0	1	0	0	4
6	FW	11	(Nigeria) Christian Ebere	3	0	0	0	0	0	3
6	MF	16	(Mexico) Jeremy Márquez	3	0	0	0	0	0	3
8	MF	19	(Mexico) Carlos Rodríguez	1	0	1	0	0	0	2
9	DF	3	(Mexico) Omar Campos	1	0	0	0	0	0	1
9	DF	4	(Colombia) Willer Ditta	1	0	0	0	0	0	1
9	MF	55	(Mexico) Rogelio González	1	0	0	0	0	0	1
9	MF	6	(Mexico) Érik Lira	1	0	0	0	0	0	1
9	MF	5	(Mexico) Jesús Orozco	1	0	0	0	0	0	1
9	MF	18	(Argentina) Luka Romero	1	0	0	0	0	0	1
9	MF	29	(Argentina) Carlos Rotondi	1	0	0	0	0	0	1
Total				37	0	3	4	0	0	44

=== Assists ===
Rank	Pos.	No.	Player	Liga MX Apertura	Liga MX Clausura	Campeón de Campeones	Leagues Cup	Campeones Cup	Champions Cup	Total
1	MF	20	(Argentina) José Paradela	5	0	1	1	0	0	7
1	MF	19	(Mexico) Carlos Rodríguez	5	0	1	1	0	0	7
3	MF	10	(Mexico) Andrés Montaño	5	0	0	0	0	0	5
4	FW	7	(Argentina) Nicolás Ibáñez	3	0	0	0	0	0	3
5	MF	6	(Mexico) Érik Lira	1	0	0	1	0	0	2
5	MF	16	(Mexico) Jeremy Márquez	2	0	0	0	0	0	2
5	DF	2	(Mexico) Alan Mozo	2	0	0	0	0	0	2
5	MF	18	(Argentina) Luka Romero	2	0	0	0	0	0	2
9	DF	3	(Mexico) Omar Campos	0	0	0	1	0	0	1
9	FW	21	(Uruguay) Gabriel Fernández	1	0	0	0	0	0	1
9	DF	5	(Mexico) Jesús Orozco	1	0	0	0	0	0	1
9	MF	8	(Argentina) Agustín Palavecino	1	0	0	0	0	0	1
9	DF	22	(Mexico) Jorge Rodarte	1	0	0	0	0	0	1
Total				29	0	2	4	0	0	35

=== Clean sheets ===
Rank	No.	Player	Liga MX Apertura	Liga MX Clausura	Campeón de Campeones	Leagues Cup	Campeones Cup	Champions Cup	Total
1	23	(Colombia) Kevin Mier	1	0	0	1	0	0	2
2	1	(Mexico) Andrés Gudiño	1	0	0	0	0	0	1
Total			2	0	0	1	0	0	3

=== Disciplinary record ===
No.	Pos.	Player	Liga MX Apertura			Liga MX Clausura			Campeón de Campeones			Leagues Cup			Campeones Cup			Champions Cup			Total		
No.	Pos.	Player	Yellow card	(yellow card) (yellow-red card)	Red card	Yellow card	(yellow card) (yellow-red card)	Red card	Yellow card	(yellow card) (yellow-red card)	Red card	Yellow card	(yellow card) (yellow-red card)	Red card	Yellow card	(yellow card) (yellow-red card)	Red card	Yellow card	(yellow card) (yellow-red card)	Red card	Yellow card	(yellow card) (yellow-red card)	Red card
4	DF	(Colombia) Willer Ditta	3	0	0	0	0	0	0	0	0	1	0	0	1	0	0	0	0	0	5	0	0
5	DF	(Mexico) Jesús Orozco	3	0	0	0	0	0	1	0	0	0	0	0	0	0	0	0	0	0	4	0	0
6	MF	(Mexico) Érik Lira	2	0	0	0	0	0	0	0	0	1	0	0	0	0	0	0	0	0	3	0	0
7	FW	(Argentina) Nicolás Ibáñez	2	0	0	0	0	0	0	0	0	0	0	0	0	0	0	0	0	0	2	0	0
8	MF	(Argentina) Agustín Palavecino	2	0	0	0	0	0	1	0	0	0	0	0	0	0	0	0	0	0	3	0	0
10	MF	(Mexico) Andrés Montaño	1	0	0	0	0	0	0	0	0	0	0	0	0	0	0	0	0	0	1	0	0
11	FW	(Nigeria) Christian Ebere	1	0	0	0	0	0	0	0	0	0	0	0	0	0	0	0	0	0	1	0	0
12	DF	(Mexico) Alán Montes	1	0	0	0	0	0	0	0	0	0	0	0	0	0	0	0	0	0	1	0	0
16	MF	(Mexico) Jeremy Márquez	3	0	0	0	0	0	0	0	0	0	0	0	0	0	0	0	0	0	3	0	0
17	MF	(Mexico) Amaury García	3	0	0	0	0	0	0	0	0	0	0	0	0	0	0	0	0	0	3	0	0
18	MF	(Argentina) Luka Romero	2	0	0	0	0	0	0	0	0	0	0	0	0	0	0	0	0	0	2	0	0
19	MF	(Mexico) Carlos Rodríguez	3	0	0	0	0	0	0	0	0	0	0	0	0	0	0	0	0	0	3	0	0
20	MF	(Argentina) José Paradela	4	0	0	0	0	0	0	0	0	1	0	0	0	0	0	0	0	0	5	0	0
21	FW	(Uruguay) Gabriel Fernández	3	0	0	0	0	0	0	0	0	0	0	0	1	0	0	0	0	0	4	0	0
29	MF	(Argentina) Carlos Rotondi	1	0	0	0	0	0	0	0	0	0	0	0	0	0	0	0	0	0	1	0	0
33	DF	(Argentina) Gonzalo Piovi	2	0	0	0	0	0	0	0	0	1	0	0	0	0	0	0	0	0	3	0	0
Total			36	0	0	0	0	0	2	0	0	4	0	0	2	0	0	0	0	0	44	0	0
