= Said Godínez =

Said Godínez may refer to:

- Said Godínez (footballer, born 1975)
- Said Godínez (footballer, born 2004)
