= Alán Montes =

Mexican footballer (born 2000)

Personal information
- Full name: Alán Isidro Montes Castro
- Date of birth: 26 October 2000 (age 25)
- Place of birth: Hermosillo, Sonora, Mexico
- Height: 1.94 m (6 ft 4 in)
- Position: Defender

Team information
- Current team: Cruz Azul
- Number: 12

Youth career
- –2018: Sonora
- 2020–2023: Necaxa

Senior career*
Years	Team	Apps	(Gls)
2020–2026	Necaxa	55	(4)
2021–2022	→ Monterrey (loan)	4	(0)
2021–2022	→ Raya2 (loan)	19	(2)
2022	→ Avilés (loan)	0	(0)
2025	→ Kansas City (loan)	8	(0)
2026	→ Serik Spor (loan)	14	(2)
2026–	Cruz Azul	4	(0)
- * Club domestic league appearances and goals as of 21 October 2026

Alán Isidro Montes Castro (born 26 October 2000) is a Mexican professional footballer who plays as a defender for Liga MX club Cruz Azul.

== Early life ==
Montes was born on 26 October 2000. Born in Hermosillo, Mexico, he is the younger brother of Mexico international César Montes.

== Career ==
As a youth player, Montes joined the youth academy of Mexican side Sonora. Following his stint there, he joined the youth academy of Mexican side Necaxa in 2020 and was promoted to the club's senior team the same year.

Ahead of the 2021–22 season, he was sent on loan to Mexican side Monterrey, where he made four league appearances and scored zero goals. During the summer of 2025, he was sent on loan to American side Sporting Kansas City, where he made eight league appearances and scored zero goals. Six months later, he was sent on loan to Turkish side Serikspor. In July 2026, Montes returned to Necaxa.

On 16 July 2026, Montes joined Cruz Azul.

== Style of play ==
Montes plays as a defender. American newspaper The Kansas City Star wrote in 2025 that he is "a physically imposing center back".

== Career statistics ==
As of match played on 21 October 2026

Appearances and goals by club, season and competition
Club	Season	League			Cup		Continental		Other		Total	
Club	Season	Division	Apps	Goals	Apps	Goals	Apps	Goals	Apps	Goals	Apps	Goals
Necaxa	2020–21	Liga MX	1	0	—		—		—		1	0
Necaxa	2023–24	Liga MX	34	2	—		—		1 (Note: Appearances in Leagues Cup)	0	35	2
Necaxa	2024–25	Liga MX	20	2	—		—		3	0	23	2
Necaxa	Total		55	4	0	0	0	0	4	0	59	4
Monterrey (loan)	2021–22	Liga MX	4	0	—		—		—		4	0
Raya2 (loan)	2021–22	Liga de Expansión MX	19	2	—		—		—		19	2
Sporting Kansas City (loan)	2025	Major League Soccer	8	0	—		—		—		8	0
Serikspor (loan)	2025–26	TFF 1. Lig	14	2	—		—		—		14	2
Cruz Azul	2026–27	Liga MX	4	0	—		—		—		4	0
Career total			104	8	0	0	0	0	4	0	108	8

== Honours ==
Cruz Azul

- Campeón de Campeones: 2026
