= Rafael Guerrero =

Mexican footballer (born 2003)

Personal information
- Full name: Rafael Guerrero Ramírez
- Date of birth: 13 January 2003 (age 23)
- Place of birth: Tijuana, Baja California, Mexico
- Height: 1.83 m (6 ft 0 in)
- Position: Centre-back

Team information
- Current team: Tigres UANL
- Number: 33

Youth career
- 2016–2017: Tijuana
- 2020–2022: Cruz Azul

Senior career*
Years	Team	Apps	(Gls)
2022–2024	Cruz Azul	26	(0)
2024–	Tigres UANL	19	(0)

International career
2023–	Mexico U23	5	(0)
Medal record
Men's football
Representing Mexico
Central American and Caribbean Games
Gold medal – first place	2023 San Salvador	Team
- * Club domestic league appearances and goals as of 7 November 2026

Rafael Guerrero Ramírez (born 13 January 2003) is a Mexican professional footballer who plays as a centre-back for Liga MX club Tigres UANL.

== Career statistics ==
=== Club ===
As of match played on 7 November 2026

Club	Season	League			Cup		Continental		Other		Total	
Club	Season	Division	Apps	Goals	Apps	Goals	Apps	Goals	Apps	Goals	Apps	Goals
Cruz Azul	2021–22	Liga MX	—		—		1 (Note: Appearance in CONCACAF Champions League)	0	—		1	0
Cruz Azul	2022–23	Liga MX	13	0	4 (Note: Appearances in Copa Sky por México)	0	—		—		17	0
Cruz Azul	2023–24	Liga MX	12	0	—		—		1 (Note: Appearance in Leagues Cup)	0	13	0
Cruz Azul	Total		25	0	4	0	1	0	1	0	31	0
Tigres UANL	2025–26	Liga MX	8	0	—		—		—		8	0
Tigres UANL	2026–27	Liga MX	11	0	—		2	0	—		13	0
Tigres UANL	Total		19	0	—		2	0	—		21	0
Career total			44	0	4	0	3	0	1	0	52	0

== Honours ==
Cruz Azul

- Supercopa de la Liga MX: 2022

Mexico U23

- Central American and Caribbean Games: 2023
