= Luis Jiménez (footballer, born 2004) =

Mexican footballer (born 2004)

Personal information
- Full name: Luis Ronaldo Jiménez González
- Date of birth: 27 August 2004 (age 22)
- Place of birth: Aguascalientes, Aguascalientes, Mexico
- Height: 1.95 m (6 ft 5 in)
- Position: Goalkeeper

Team information
- Current team: Necaxa
- Number: 12

Youth career
- 2021–2023: Pachuca
- 2023–2025: Necaxa

Senior career*
Years	Team	Apps	(Gls)
2023–	Necaxa	10	(0)
2024	→ Cruz Azul (loan)	0	(0)
- * Club domestic league appearances and goals as of 11 October 2026

Luis Ronaldo Jiménez González (born 27 August 2004), is a Mexican professional footballer who plays as a goalkeeper for Liga MX club Necaxa.

== Club career ==
Jiménez began his career at the academy of Pachuca, before moving to Necaxa's academy. On 30 December 2026, he was loaned to Cruz Azul where he spent a year as a back up before moving back to Necaxa.

On 19 July 2026, Jiménez made his professional debut in a 2–1 win against Atlante, where he played the whole game.

== Career statistics ==
=== Club ===
As of match played on 11 October 2026

Appearances and goals by club, season and competition
Club	Season	League			Cup		Continental		Other		Total	
Club	Season	Division	Apps	Goals	Apps	Goals	Apps	Goals	Apps	Goals	Apps	Goals
Necaxa	2026–27	Liga MX	10	0	—		—		3 (Note: Appearances in Leagues Cup)	0	13	0
Career total			10	0	0	0	0	0	3	0	13	0
