= Ricardo Rodríguez (footballer, born 2001) =

Mexican footballer (born 2001)

Personal information
- Full name: Ricardo Rodríguez Mazzocco
- Date of birth: 15 March 2001 (age 25)
- Place of birth: Valle de Santiago, Guanajuato, Mexico
- Height: 1.82 m (6 ft 0 in)
- Position: Goalkeeper

Team information
- Current team: Cruz Azul
- Number: 13

Youth career
- 2018–2019: Morelia

Senior career*
Years	Team	Apps	(Gls)
2020–2025	Tlaxcala	34	(0)
2026	Mazatlán	17	(0)
2026–	Cruz Azul	0	(0)
2026–	Cruz Azul Hidalgo	3	(0)
- * Club domestic league appearances and goals as of 10 October 2026

Ricardo Rodríguez Mazzocco (born 15 March 2001) is a Mexican professional footballer who plays as a goalkeeper for Liga MX club Cruz Azul.

== Club career ==
Rodríguez began his career at the academy of Morelia before moving to Tlaxcala, making his professional debut in a 1–1 draw with UdeG and breaking out in the 2024–2025 season. This earned him a move to Mazatlán and on 10 January 2026, he made his Liga MX debut in a 1–2 loss to Juárez.

On 28 August 2026, Rodríguez signed with Cruz Azul.

== Career statistics ==
As of match played on 10 October 2026

Appearances and goals by club, season and competition
Club	Season	League			Cup		Continental		Intercontinental		Other		Total	
Club	Season	Division	Apps	Goals	Apps	Goals	Apps	Goals	Apps	Goals	Apps	Goals	Apps	Goals
Tlaxcala	2020–21	Liga de Expansión MX	6	0	—		—		—		—		6	0
Tlaxcala	2023–24	Liga de Expansión MX	2	0	—		—		—		—		2	0
Tlaxcala	2024–25	Liga de Expansión MX	26	0	—		—		—		—		26	0
Tlaxcala	Total		34	0	—		—		—		—		34	0
Mazatlán	2025–26	Liga MX	17	0	—		—		—		1 (Note: Appearance in Leagues Cup)	0	18	0
Cruz Azul Hidalgo	2026–27	Liga de Expansión MX	3	0	—		—		—		—		3	0
Career total			54	0	0	0	0	0	0	0	1	0	55	0
