= Said Godínez (footballer, born 1975) =

Mexican footballer (born 1975)

Personal information
- Full name: José Said Hilario Godínez López
- Date of birth: 21 July 1975 (age 51)
- Place of birth: Mazatlán, Sinaloa, Mexico
- Height: 1.75 m (5 ft 9 in)
- Position: Midfielder

Team information
- Current team: Tecos UAG
- Number: 7

Senior career*
Years	Team	Apps	(Gls)
1998–2009	Tecos UAG	210	(11)
- * Club domestic league appearances and goals as of March 11, 2007

José Said Hilario Godínez López (born July 21, 1975) is a Mexican former footballer who played for Tecos UAG as a midfielder.

== Career ==
Born in Mazatlán, Godínez moved to Guadalajara to play professional football. He played for Tecos' in the Primera División from 1998 through 2009. In April 2008, Godínez almost left Tecos because he hadn't been paid since January due to the club's financial difficulties.

After he retired from playing, Godínez became the president of Tercera División de México club Chivas Mazatlán.

== Personal life ==
Godínez's son, also named Said Godínez, is also a professional footballer.
