= Said Godínez (footballer, born 2004) =

Mexican footballer (born 2004)

Personal information
- Full name: Said Godínez Gaytán
- Date of birth: 26 October 2004 (age 22)
- Place of birth: Guadalajara, Jalisco, Mexico
- Height: 1.73 m (5 ft 8 in)
- Position: Defensive midfielder

Team information
- Current team: Juárez
- Number: 25

Youth career
- 2019–2021: Guadalajara
- 2022–2025: Mazatlán

Senior career*
Years	Team	Apps	(Gls)
2025–2026	Mazatlán	18	(0)
2026–	Juárez	0	(0)
- * Club domestic league appearances and goals as of 17 June 2026

Said Godínez Gaytán (born 26 October 2004) is a Mexican professional footballer who plays as a defensive midfielder for Liga MX club Juárez.

== Club career ==
Godínez began his career at the academy of Guadalajara, before moving to Mazatlán, where he made his professional debut on 8 March 2025 in a 1–1 draw with Pachuca, playing 66 minutes as a starter.

On 17 June 2026, Godínez signed with Juárez.

== Career statistics ==
=== Club ===
As of 17 June 2026

Appearances and goals by club, season and competition
Club	Season	League			Cup		Continental		Other		Total	
Club	Season	Division	Apps	Goals	Apps	Goals	Apps	Goals	Apps	Goals	Apps	Goals
Mazatlán	2024–25	Liga MX	4	0	—		—		—		4	0
Mazatlán	2025–26	Liga MX	14	0	—		—		—		14	0
Career total			18	0	0	0	0	0	0	0	18	0

== Personal life ==
He is the son of former footballer Said Godínez.
