= Gustavo Ferrareis =

Brazilian footballer (born 1996)

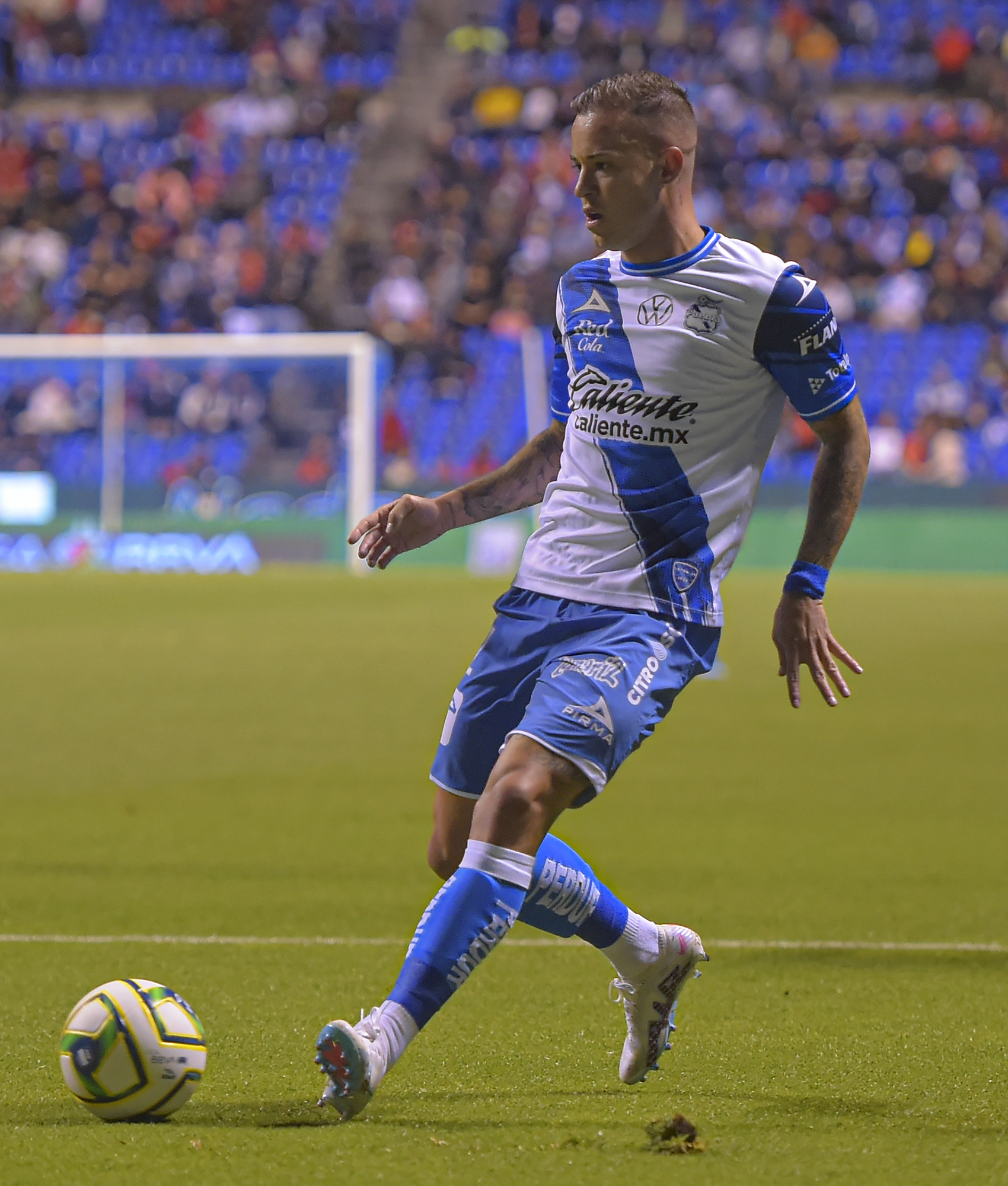

Personal information
- Full name: Gustavo Henrique Ferrareis
- Date of birth: 2 January 1996 (age 30)
- Place of birth: Lençois Paulista, Brazil
- Height: 1.77 m (5 ft 9 1/2 in)
- Position: Right-back

Youth career
- 2007–2015: Internacional

Senior career*
Years	Team	Apps	(Gls)
2014–2020	Internacional	38	(3)
2017	→ Bahia (loan)	11	(1)
2018	→ Figueirense (loan)	53	(8)
2019	→ Botafogo (loan)	10	(2)
2019	→ Avaí (loan)	8	(0)
2020	→ Atlético Goianiense (loan)	40	(5)
2021–2025	Puebla	55	(1)
2025–2026	Atlas	38	(0)
- * Club domestic league appearances and goals as of 09:11, 28 July 2022 (UTC)

Gustavo Henrique Ferrareis (born 2 January 1996), known as Gustavo Ferrareis or just Ferrareis, is a Brazilian professional footballer who plays as a winger and full-back.

== Club career ==
Born in Lençóis Paulista, São Paulo, Ferrareis is a youth exponent from Internacional. He made his first team – and Série A – debut on 29 November 2014, coming on as a second-half substitute for goalscorer Taiberson in a 3–1 home win against Palmeiras.

Ferrareis was definitely promoted to the main squad ahead of the 2016 season, and scored his first senior goal on 8 May of that year in a 3–0 Campeonato Gaúcho home success over Juventude. His first top tier goal came on 25 September, but in a 3–1 away loss against Atlético Mineiro; he finished the year with two goals in 24 league appearances, as his side was relegated for the first time ever.

== Honours ==
Internacional

- Campeonato Gaúcho: 2016

Figueirense

- Campeonato Catarinense: 2018

Individual

- Liga MX All-Star: 2025
