= Mauro Zaleta =

Mexican footballer (born 2002)

Personal information
- Full name: Mauro Aldair Zaleta Oropeza
- Date of birth: 2 April 2002 (age 24)
- Place of birth: Tuxpan, Veracruz, Mexico
- Height: 1.73 m (5 ft 8 in)
- Positions: Left-back; attacking midfielder

Team information
- Current team: Necaxa (on loan from Cruz Azul)
- Number: 14

Youth career
- 2018–2019: Guadalajara
- 2019–2020: Tuxpan
- 2021–2025: Cruz Azul

Senior career*
Years	Team	Apps	(Gls)
2022–	Cruz Azul	5	(0)
2026	→ Mazatlán (loan)	27	(2)
2026–	→ Necaxa (loan)	13	(0)
- * Club domestic league appearances and goals as of 6 November 2026

Mauro Aldair Zaleta Oropeza (born 2 April 2002) is a Mexican professional footballer who plays as a left-back and attacking midfielder for Liga MX club Necaxa, on loan from Cruz Azul.

== Club career ==
Zaleta began his career at the academies of Guadalajara, Tuxpan and Cruz Azul, making his professional debut with the latter club on 9 January 2022 in a 2–0 win against Tijuana, being subbed in at the 91st minute.

On 27 August 2025, Zaleta was loaned to Mazatlán, making his debut three days later in a 0–1 loss to Juárez, playing the second half of the match. On 24 October, he scored his first goal as a professional in a 2–2 draw with América.

On 2 July 2026, Zaleta was loaned to Necaxa.

== Career statistics ==
As of match played on 6 November 2026

Appearances and goals by club, season and competition
Club	Season	League			Cup		Continental		Other		Total	
Club	Season	Division	Apps	Goals	Apps	Goals	Apps	Goals	Apps	Goals	Apps	Goals
Cruz Azul	2021–22	Liga MX	1	0	—		—		—		1	0
Cruz Azul	2023–24	Liga MX	4	0	—		—		—		4	0
Cruz Azul	Total		5	0	—		—		—		5	0
Mazatlán (loan)	2025–26	Liga MX	27	2	—		—		—		27	2
Necaxa (loan)	2026–27	Liga MX	13	0	—		—		2 (Note: Appearances in Leagues Cup)	0	15	0
Career total			45	2	0	0	0	0	2	0	47	2
