= Yan Phillipe =

Brazilian footballer

Personal information
- Full name: Yan Philipe Oliveira Lemos
- Date of birth: 17 May 2004 (age 22)
- Place of birth: Minas Gerais, Brazil
- Height: 1.77 m (5 ft 9 1/2 in)
- Position: Winger

Team information
- Current team: Kalba
- Number: 49

Youth career
- Atlético Mineiro

Senior career*
Years	Team	Apps	(Gls)
2022–2024	Atlético Mineiro	1	(0)
2024–2026	Atlético San Luis	36	(4)
2026–	Kalba	0	(0)
- * Club domestic league appearances and goals as of 16:44, 23 August 2025 (UTC)

Yan Philipe Oliveira Lemos (born 17 May 2004), known simply as Yan Phillipe, is a Brazilian professional footballer who plays as a winger for Kalba.

== Club career ==
Yan Phillipe came through the youth system of Atlético Mineiro and played one professional game, before joining Liga MX club Atlético San Luis on 31 January 2024.

He scored his first goal for the club on 1 March 2024 in a 4–0 win over Puebla.

== Career statistics ==
As of 23 August 2025

Club	Season	League			Cup		Continental		Other		Total	
Club	Season	Division	Apps	Goals	Apps	Goals	Apps	Goals	Apps	Goals	Apps	Goals
Atlético Mineiro	2022	Série A	1	0	0	0	0	0	—		1	0
Atlético Mineiro	2023	Série A	0	0	0	0	0	0	—		0	0
Atlético San Luis	2023–24	Liga MX	6	2	–		–		–		6	2
Atlético San Luis	2024–25	Liga MX	24	2	–		–		2 (Note: Appearance(s) in Leagues Cup)	0	26	2
Atlético San Luis	2025–26	Liga MX	6	0	–		–		3	0	9	0
Total			36	4	0	0	0	0	5	0	41	4
Career total			37	4	0	0	0	0	5	0	42	4
