= Alberto Herrera =

Mexican footballer (born 2001)

Personal information
- Full name: Alberto Herrera Rodríguez
- Date of birth: 23 February 2001 (age 25)
- Place of birth: Ciudad Madero, Tamaulipas, Mexico
- Height: 1.73 m (5 ft 8 in)
- Position: Attacking midfielder

Team information
- Current team: Puebla
- Number: 3

Youth career
- 2015–2020: Pachuca
- 2020–2022: Puebla

Senior career*
| Years | Team | Apps | (Gls) |
| 2021– | Puebla | 62 | (3) |
| 2025–2026 | → Mazatlán (loan) | 4 | (1) |

International career^{‡}
| 2023– | Mexico U23 | 5 | (0) |
| 2024– | Mexico | 1 | (0) |
Medal record
Men's football
Representing Mexico
Toulon Tournament
| Second place | 2023 France | Team |
- * Club domestic league appearances and goals as of 7 October 2026 ‡ National team caps and goals as of 31 May 2024

Alberto Herrera Rodríguez (born 23 February 2001) is a Mexican professional footballer who plays as a defensive midfielder for Liga MX club Puebla.

== Club career ==
On 3 June 2026, Herrera returned to Puebla.

== International career ==
Herrera made his debut for the Mexico national team on 31 May 2024 in a friendly against Bolivia.

== Career statistics ==
=== Club ===
As of 7 October 2026

| Club | Season | League | | | Cup | | Continental | | Other | | Total | |
| Club | Season | Division | Apps | Goals | Apps | Goals | Apps | Goals | Apps | Goals | Apps | Goals |
|---|---|---|---|---|---|---|---|---|---|---|---|---|
| Puebla | 2021–22 | Liga MX | 17 | 1 | — | | — | | — | | 17 | 1 |
| Puebla | 2022–23 | Liga MX | 10 | 0 | — | | — | | — | | 10 | 0 |
| Puebla | 2023–24 | Liga MX | 10 | 2 | — | | — | | — | | 10 | 2 |
| Puebla | 2024–25 | Liga MX | 22 | 0 | — | | — | | 2 (Note: Appearances in Leagues Cup) | 0 | 24 | 0 |
| Puebla | 2026–27 | Liga MX | 3 | 0 | — | | — | | 1 | 0 | 4 | 0 |
| Puebla | Total | | 62 | 3 | — | | — | | 3 | 0 | 65 | 3 |
| Mazatlán (loan) | 2025–26 | Liga MX | 4 | 1 | — | | — | | 2 | 0 | 6 | 1 |
| Career total | | | 66 | 4 | 0 | 0 | 0 | 0 | 5 | 0 | 71 | 4 |

=== International ===
As of match played on 31 May 2024

Appearances and goals by national team and year
| National team | Year | Apps | Goals |
|---|---|---|---|
| Mexico | 2024 | 1 | 0 |
| Total | | 1 | 0 |
