= Estadio El Encanto =

Football stadium in Mazatlán, Mexico

- El Kraken ("The Kraken")

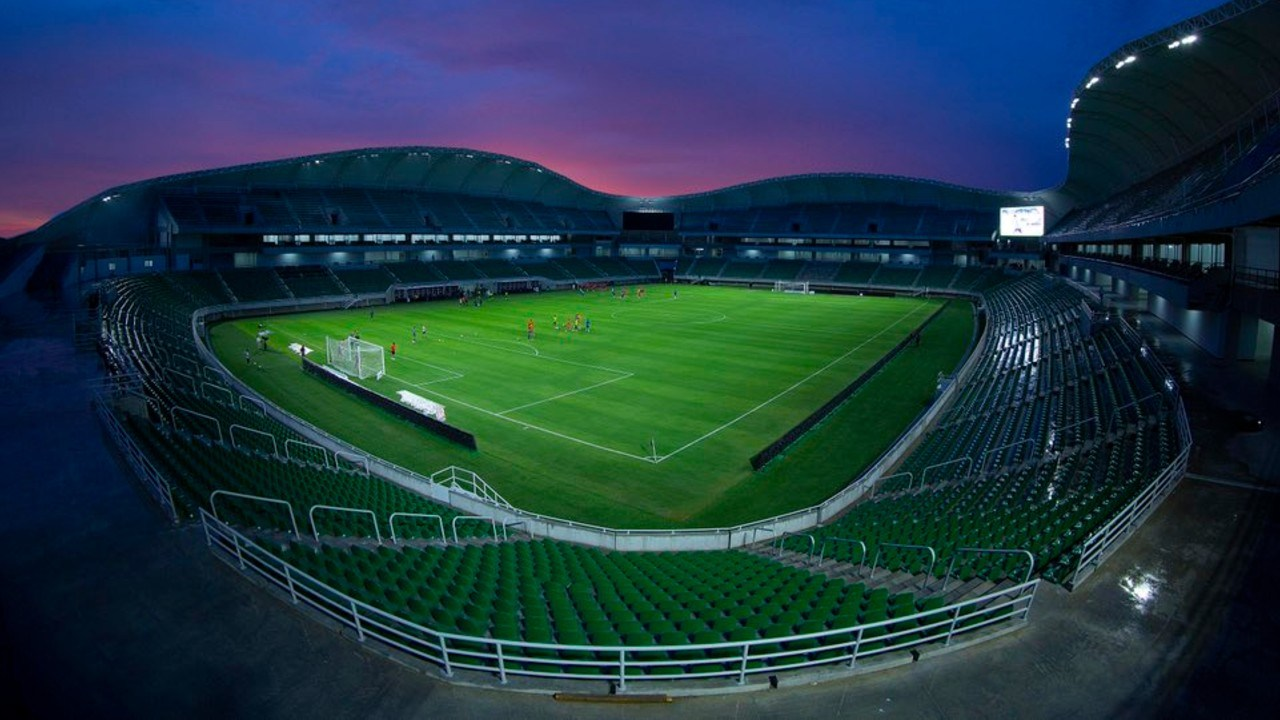
- Interior of the stadium
- Interactive map of Estadio El Encanto
- Location: Avenida Munich, Fraccionamiento Pradera Dorada, Mazatlán, Sinaloa
- Coordinates: 23°16′35″N 106°22′52″W
- Owner: Government of Sinaloa
- Operator: Mazatlán F.C.
- Capacity: 20,195
- Surface: Grass

Construction
- Built: 2020
- Opened: 27 July 2020; 6 years ago
- Cost: $MXN 652,000,000

Tenants
- Mazatlán F.C. (2020–2026); Dorados de Sinaloa (2026–present); Mexico national football team (selected matches)

The Estadio El Encanto, is a football stadium located in the city of Mazatlán, Sinaloa. It was inaugurated in 2020 and has a capacity of approximately 25,000 people. The stadium was the home of Mazatlán F.C., which began its participation in the Liga MX in the Apertura 2020 tournament after the relocation of Monarcas Morelia to Mazatlán, Sinaloa, and ended in the Clausura 2026 tournament, after being acquired by the Liga de Expansión MX club Atlante and relocated to Mexico City. Since July 2026 is the home of the Liga de Expansión MX team Dorados de Sinaloa.

== History ==
In 2017, construction work began on a football stadium in the city of Mazatlán as part of a project to build and modernize various sports venues in the state of Sinaloa. The goal was for a football team to occupy the stadium, though there was no club based in the city.

In that same year, Pacific F.C. was founded, which belonged to Grupo Faharo, owners of Murciélagos Fútbol Club. However, during its first tournaments of existence, the team had as its temporary headquarters in the city of Los Mochis. It was not until January 2019 that Pacific arrived at Mazatlán, playing at the Estadio Teodoro Mariscal, a baseball stadium. This club would only play in the city for a few months.

In 2020, construction of the stadium was accelerated to have it ready for the start of the 2020–21 football season. Finally, on June 2, the arrival of a new team for the venue was confirmed as Monarcas Morelia was relocated from Morelia, Michoacán and renamed as Mazatlán Fútbol Club. The stadium was provisionally named Estadio de Mazatlán. On July 7, 2020, Mazatlán F.C. announced that the stadium would be called El Kraken internally and publicly; however, it officially continued to carry the original name.

On July 27, 2020, the first game at the stadium was held between Mazatlán and Puebla during the first week of the Torneo Guardianes 2020, a 4-1 loss for the home side. The first goal at the venue was scored by Puebla's Santiago Ormeño.

The stadium hosted its first international match on June 7, 2023 when a friendly game was held between the national teams of Mexico and Guatemala. Raúl Jiménez scored the first international goal in the history of this venue.

On October 25, 2023, the stadium was renamed as Estadio El Encanto, after Mazatlán F.C. signed an alliance agreement with a local company dedicated to the construction of houses, the company is named Encanto Desarrollos.

On April 22, 2026, Mazatlán played its final top-flight match at El Encanto after Atlante, a Liga de Expansión MX club, acquired the club's Liga MX franchise and relocated it to Mexico City.

On July, 2026 Dorados de Sinaloa moved to the stadium to play in it starting from the Apertura 2026.

== International matches ==
=== Mexico national football team ===
Date		Result		Competition
June 7, 2023	Mexico	2–0	Guatemala	Friendly

== See also ==
- List of football stadiums in Mexico
- Estadio Teodoro Mariscal
