= Emanuel Gularte =

Uruguayan footballer (born 1997)

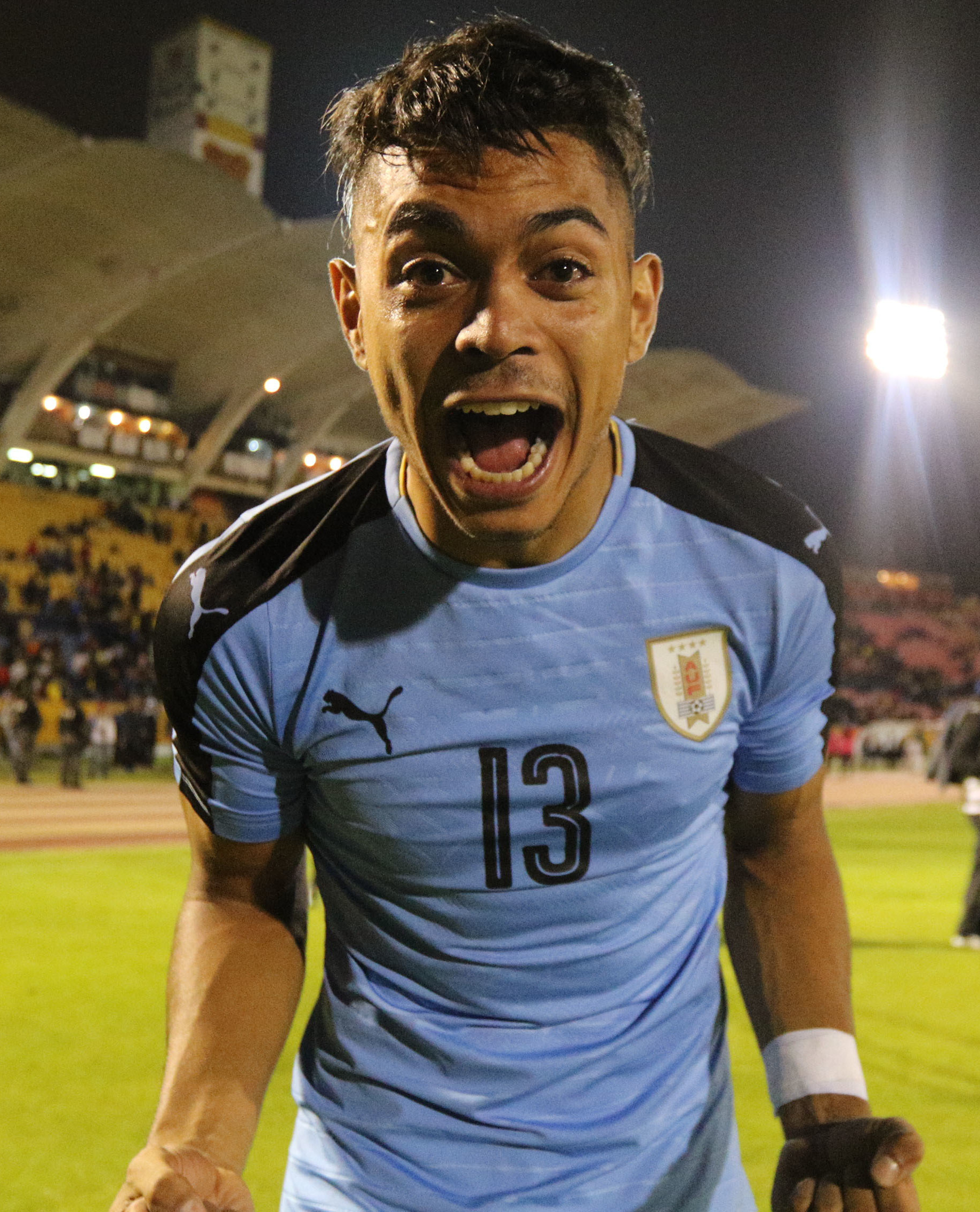
- Gularte with Uruguay U23

Personal information
- Full name: Emanuel Gularte Méndez
- Date of birth: 30 September 1997 (age 29)
- Place of birth: Montevideo, Uruguay
- Height: 1.89 m (6 ft 2 in)
- Position: Centre-back

Team information
- Current team: Sporting Gijón (on loan from Puebla)

Senior career*
Years	Team	Apps	(Gls)
2015–2020	Montevideo Wanderers	24	(2)
2019	→ Progreso (loan)	29	(2)
2020–	Puebla	102	(5)
2023–2024	→ Querétaro (loan)	34	(2)
2025–2026	→ Peñarol (loan)	22	(1)
2026–	→ Sporting Gijón (loan)	0	(0)

International career
2015	Uruguay U18	4	(0)
2015–2017	Uruguay U20	7	(0)
2019	Uruguay U22	4	(0)
2020	Uruguay U23	5	(0)
Medal record
Men's football
Representing Uruguay
South American U-20 Championship
Winner	2017 Ecuador
- * Club domestic league appearances and goals as of 7 June 2026

Emanuel Gularte Méndez (born 30 September 1997) is a Uruguayan professional footballer who plays as a defender for Segunda División club Sporting Gijón, on loan from Liga MX club Puebla.

== Club career ==
In June 2023, Gularte joined Querétaro on loan from Puebla. On 7 July 2026, after a one-year loan at Peñarol, he moved to Spain with Segunda División side Sporting Gijón, also in a temporary deal.

== International career ==
As a youth international, Gularte has represented Uruguay at the 2017 South American U-20 Championship, 2017 FIFA U-20 World Cup and the 2019 Pan American Games.
