= Mazatlán F.C. =

Association football club in Mexico

Mazatlán
- Full name: Mazatlán Futbol Club
- Nickname: Cañoneros (Gunners)
- Short name: MZN, MFC
- Founded: 2 June 2020; 6 years ago
- Dissolved: 25 April 2026; 4 months ago
- Owner: Grupo Salinas
- Clausura 2026: Regular phase: 16th Final phase: Did not qualify
Home colours	Away colours	Third colours

Mazatlán Futbol Club, simplified as Mazatlán F.C., was a Mexican professional football club based in Mazatlán, Sinaloa. The club competed in Liga MX, the top division level of Mexican football, and played its home matches at Estadio El Encanto.

Founded in 2020 following the relocation of the Monarcas Morelia franchise to Mazatlán, Sinaloa, the club spent six seasons competing in Mexico's top division. The team was ultimately dissolved at the conclusion of the Clausura 2026, after the franchise was acquired by Expansión MX side Atlante and relocated to Mexico City.

== History ==
In 2017, the government of Sinaloa decided to build a new football stadium in Mazatlán as part of a project that intended to build and improve several sport venues in the state. One of the goals of this project was to have a professional football team playing in Mazatlán.

In 2020, works were accelerated in order to have the stadium completed before June 30 and ahead of the start of the 2020–21 season with the aim of looking for a professional team to move to the newly built stadium. The stadium was provisionally named as Estadio de Mazatlán (Mazatlán Stadium) and it reportedly cost 1.452 billion pesos.

The Government of Sinaloa, together with a group of businessmen from Mazatlán, lobbied with a few Liga MX teams. Three franchises were rumored as potential candidates to be moved to Mazatlán for the 2020–21 season: Monarcas Morelia, Puebla, and Querétaro.

On June 2, it was officially announced that Monarcas Morelia was being moved to Mazatlán, and that it would be rebranded as Mazatlán Futbol Club, as a entirely separate football club. On June 8, Mazatlán unveiled its crest and colors. The team colors were purple, black, and white.

On June 11, the club presented Francisco Palencia as their manager for the 2020–21 season. On July 27, Mazatlán played their first official match, in which they were defeated against Puebla with a score of 1–4: the club's first official goal was scored by César Huerta.

On December 9, 2025, Atlante announced its intent to acquire Mazatlán's Primera División franchise and relocate it to Mexico City to take its place in the Liga MX after twelve years of absence. The transaction was finalized on 23 April 2026, and two days later, the club played its final match, a 5–1 loss to Tigres UANL.

== Personnel ==
=== Management ===
Position	Staff
Chairman	(Mexico) Mauricio Lanz González
Director of football	(Mexico) Jaime Ordiales
Director of academy	(Mexico) Christian Ramírez

Source: Liga MX

=== Coaching staff ===
Position	Staff
Manager	(Mexico) Sergio Bueno
Assistant managers	(Mexico) René Isidoro García
Assistant managers	(Mexico) Alejandro Mercado
Assistant managers	(Mexico) Guillermo Velázquez
Fitness coaches	(Mexico) José Pedraza
Fitness coaches	(Mexico) Julio Carranza
Physiotherapist	(Mexico) Héctor Tapia
Team doctor	(Mexico) José Cedillo

== Players ==
=== Final squad ===
As of 17 May 2026

Note: Flags indicate national team as defined under FIFA eligibility rules; some limited exceptions apply. Players may hold more than one non-FIFA nationality.

No.	Pos.	Nation	Player
2	MF	MEX	Jorge García (on loan from Cruz Azul)
3	DF	MEX	Ramiro Franco
4	DF	MEX	Jair Díaz
5	DF	ARG	Facundo Almada
8	MF	MEX	Sebastián Fierro (on loan from León)
9	FW	ECU	Billy Arce
10	MF	MEX	Omar Moreno
11	MF	PAN	Yoel Bárcenas
12	DF	MEX	Salvador Rodríguez
13	GK	MEX	André Alcaráz
14	DF	MEX	Mauro Zaleta (on loan from Cruz Azul)
15	FW	MEX	Brian Rubio
16	MF	MEX	José Joaquín Esquivel
17	MF	CHI	Josué Ovalle (on loan from Deportes Limache)

No.	Pos.	Nation	Player
18	MF	MEX	Alan Torres
19	DF	ARG	Lucas Merolla
20	MF	MEX	Mauro Lainez
21	MF	MEX	Sebastián Santos (on loan from León)
22	MF	MEX	Alberto Herrera (on loan from Puebla)
23	MF	ECU	Jordan Sierra
25	MF	MEX	Said Godínez
26	DF	MEX	Ángel Leyva
27	MF	MEX	Gilberto Adame
28	MF	MEX	Jesús Hernández (on loan from Pachuca)
31	MF	MEX	Ángel Saavedra
32	DF	MEX	Christopher Castro
33	GK	MEX	Ricardo Rodríguez
90	FW	BRA	Fábio

=== Out on loan ===
Note: Flags indicate national team as defined under FIFA eligibility rules; some limited exceptions apply. Players may hold more than one non-FIFA nationality.

No.	Pos.	Nation	Player
—	GK	MEX	Hugo González (at Toluca)
—	DF	MEX	Gustavo Guzmán (at Cancún)
—	MF	MEX	Alan Cota (at Atlético La Paz)

No.	Pos.	Nation	Player
—	FW	MEX	Raúl Camacho (at UdeG)
—	FW	PAR	Luis Amarilla (at Cerro Porteño)

== Managers ==
- (Mexico) Francisco Palencia (June 11, 2020 – October 3, 2020)
- (Mexico) Tomás Boy (October 5, 2020 – May 3, 2021)
- (Spain) Beñat San José (May 18, 2021 – March 2, 2022)
- (Mexico) Gabriel Caballero (March 14, 2022 – January 29, 2023)
- (Argentina) Ruben Omar Romano (February 4, 2023 – April 30, 2023)
- (Spain) Ismael Rescalvo (May 18, 2023 – April 8, 2024)
- (Mexico) Víctor Manuel Vucetich (May 8, 2024 – May 13, 2025)
- (Uruguay) Robert Siboldi (May 20, 2025 – December 12, 2025)
- (Mexico) Christian Ramírez (December 12, 2025 – January 20, 2026)
- (Mexico) Sergio Bueno (January 20, 2026 – April 25, 2026)

== Honours ==
=== Friendly ===
- Copa del Pacífico: 2022, 2023
- Denso International Football Cup: 2025
