= 2024–25 Club América season =

América
2024–25 season
- President: Santiago Baños
- Manager: André Jardine
- Stadium: Estadio Ciudad de los Deportes
- Apertura: Regular phase: 8th Final phase: Winners
- Clausura: Regular phase: 2nd Final phase: Runners-up
- Supercopa de la Liga MX: Winners
- Leagues Cup: Quarter-finals
- Campeones Cup: Winners
- CONCACAF Champions Cup: Quarter-finals
- FIFA Club World Cup: Play-in match
- Top goalscorer: League: Apertura: Henry Martín (9); Clausura: Víctor Dávila; Álvaro Fidalgo; Alejandro Zendejas (7 each); All: Henry Martín; Brian Rodríguez (13 each)
- Highest home attendance: 40,814 v Pachuca (6 November 2024, Apertura)
- Lowest home attendance: 9,997 v Querétaro (12 July 2024, Apertura)
- Average home league attendance: 21,298 (A) 25,685 (C)
- Biggest win: 5–0 v Mazatlán (1 November 2024, Apertura); 5–0 v Mazatlán (19 April 2025, Clausura)
- Biggest defeat: 0–4 v Toluca (9 November 2024, Apertura)
Home colours	Away colours	Third colours

The 2024–25 Club América season was the club's 80th consecutive season in the top-flight of Mexican football. The team participated in the Liga MX, Supercopa de Campeones, Leagues Cup, Campeones Cup, CONCACAF Champions Cup, and the FIFA Club World Cup.

== Coaching staff ==
Position	Staff
Manager	(Brazil) André Jardine
Assistant managers	(Brazil) Paulo Victor Gomes
Assistant managers	(Mexico) Raúl Lara
Goalkeeper coach	(Mexico) Luis Gurrola
Fitness coaches	(Brazil) Kako Perez
Fitness coaches	(Mexico) Francisco Martínez
Physiotherapists	(Argentina) Fernando Gilardi
Physiotherapists	(Mexico) Octavio Luna
Physiotherapists	(Mexico) Francisco Faustino
Team doctors	(Mexico) Alfonso Díaz
Team doctors	(Mexico) José Guadalupe Vázquez
Team doctors	(Argentina) Christian Motta

Source: Club América

== Players ==
=== Squad information ===
No.	Pos.	Nat.	Name	Date of birth (age)	Since	From
Goalkeepers
1	GK	(Mexico)	Luis Malagón	2 March 1997 (age 29)	2023	(Mexico) Necaxa
12	GK	(Mexico)	Jonathan Estrada	16 March 1998 (age 28)	2024	(Mexico) Atlético La Paz
30	GK	(Mexico)	Rodolfo Cota	3 July 1987 (age 38)	2024	(Mexico) León
Defenders
3	DF	(Mexico)	Israel Reyes	23 May 2000 (age 26)	2023	(Mexico) Puebla
4	DF	(Uruguay)	Sebastián Cáceres	18 August 1999 (age 26)	2020	(Uruguay) Liverpool
5	DF	(Mexico)	Kevin Álvarez	15 January 1999 (age 27)	2023	(Mexico) Pachuca
14	DF	(Mexico)	Néstor Araujo	29 August 1991 (age 34)	2022	(Spain) Celta de Vigo
18	DF	(Mexico)	Cristian Calderón	24 March 1997 (age 29)	2024	Free agent
26	DF	(Colombia)	Cristian Borja	18 February 1993 (age 33)	2024	(Portugal) Braga
29	DF	(Mexico)	Ramón Juárez	9 May 2001 (age 25)	2019	Academy
31	DF	(Chile)	Igor Lichnovsky	7 March 1994 (age 32)	2023	(Mexico) UANL
32	DF	(Mexico)	Miguel Vásquez	7 February 2004 (age 22)	2022	Academy
Midfielders
6	MF	(Mexico)	Jonathan dos Santos	26 April 1990 (age 36)	2022	Free agent
8	MF	(Spain)	Álvaro Fidalgo	9 April 1997 (age 29)	2021	(Spain) Castellón
10	MF	(Chile)	Diego Valdés	30 January 1994 (age 32)	2021	(Mexico) Santos Laguna
13	MF	(Mexico)	Alan Cervantes	17 January 1998 (age 28)	2024	(Mexico) Santos Laguna
17	MF	(United States)	Alejandro Zendejas	7 February 1998 (age 28)	2022	(Mexico) Necaxa
24	MF	(Netherlands)	Javairô Dilrosun	22 June 1998 (age 28)	2024	(Netherlands) Feyenoord
28	MF	(Mexico)	Érick Sánchez	27 September 1999 (age 26)	2024	(Mexico) Pachuca
34	MF	(Mexico)	Dagoberto Espinoza	17 April 2004 (age 22)	2024	Academy
Forwards
7	FW	(Uruguay)	Brian Rodríguez	20 May 2000 (age 26)	2022	(United States) LAFC
11	FW	(Chile)	Víctor Dávila	4 November 1997 (age 28)	2024	(Russia) CSKA Moscow
21	FW	(Mexico)	Henry Martín	18 September 1992 (age 33)	2018	(Mexico) Tijuana
27	FW	(Uruguay)	Rodrigo Aguirre	1 October 1994 (age 31)	2024	(Mexico) Monterrey
35	FW	(Mexico)	Esteban Lozano	10 March 2003 (age 23)	2020	Academy

Players and squad numbers last updated on 12 March 2025.
Note: Flags indicate national team as has been defined under FIFA eligibility rules. Players may hold more than one non-FIFA nationality.

== Transfers ==
=== Summer ===
==== In ====
Date	Pos.	Player	Age	From	Fee	Source
21 June 2024	GK	(Mexico) Rodolfo Cota	36	(Mexico) León	On loan	
21 June 2024	MF	(Mexico) José Iván Rodríguez	28	(Mexico) León	On loan	
22 June 2024	GK	(Mexico) Jonathan Estrada	26	(Mexico) Atlético La Paz	Undisclosed	
28 June 2024	MF	(Mexico) Érick Sánchez	24	(Mexico) Pachuca	Undisclosed	
14 July 2024	MF	(Mexico) Alan Cervantes	26	(Mexico) Santos Laguna	Undisclosed	
18 July 2024	FW	(Uruguay) Rodrigo Aguirre	29	(Mexico) Monterrey	Undisclosed	
18 July 2024	DF	(Chile) Igor Lichnovsky	30	(Mexico) UANL	Undisclosed	
19 July 2024	DF	(Colombia) Cristian Borja	31	(Portugal) Braga	Undisclosed	
15 September 2024	FW	(Chile) Víctor Dávila	26	(Russia) CSKA Moscow	Undisclosed	

==== Out ====
Date	Pos.	Player	Age	To	Fee	Source
20 June 2024	FW	(Mexico) Julián Quiñones	27	(Saudi Arabia) Al Qadsiah	Undisclosed (Note: Reportedly US$16 million.)	
21 June 2024	GK	(Mexico) Óscar Jiménez	35	(Mexico) León	On loan	
24 June 2024	DF	(Mexico) Salvador Reyes	26	(Mexico) León	Undisclosed	
26 June 2024	MF	(Mexico) Mauro Lainez	28	(Mexico) Mazatlán	Undisclosed	
3 July 2024	MF	(Mexico) Alan Medina	26	(Mexico) Querétaro	Released	
4 July 2024	DF	(Mexico) Luis Fuentes	37	Released		
12 July 2024	FW	(Colombia) Juan Otero	29	(Spain) Sporting Gijón	Released	
14 July 2024	MF	(Mexico) Santiago Naveda	23	(Mexico) Santos Laguna	On loan	
18 July 2024	FW	(Mexico) Esteban Lozano	21	(Spain) Sporting Gijón	On loan	
28 August 2024	DF	(Mexico) Emilio Lara	22	(Mexico) Necaxa	On loan	

=== Winter ===
==== In ====
Date	Pos.	Player	Age	From	Fee	Source
5 January 2025	FW	(Mexico) Esteban Lozano	21	(Spain) Sporting Gijón	Loan terminated	

==== Out ====
Date	Pos.	Player	Age	To	Fee	Source
19 December 2024	MF	(Mexico) José Iván Rodríguez	28	(Mexico) Necaxa	End of loan	
31 December 2024	FW	(Mexico) Illian Hernández	24	(Mexico) Pachuca	End of loan	
12 March 2025	MF	(Paraguay) Richard Sánchez	28	(Argentina) Racing Club	$3,000,000	

== Pre-season and friendlies ==
Club América will precede their 2024–25 campaign by taking part in a series of friendly matches in the United States.

Date	Opponents	H / A	Result F–A	Scorers
23 June 2024	(Mexico) Juárez	N	1–1	Vázquez 72'
31 July 2024	(England) Chelsea	N	0–3	
3 August 2024	(England) Aston Villa	N	1–0	Hernández 77'
7 September 2024	(Colombia) Atlético Nacional	N	2–2	S. García 53' (o.g.), Aguirre 83' (pen.)
13 October 2024	(Mexico) Guadalajara	N	2–0	Aguirre 20', Hernández 45+1'
18 January 2025	(United States) Inter Miami	N	2–2 (2–3 p)	Martín 31', Reyes 52'
11 February 2025	(United States) Los Angeles FC	A	1–2	R. Sánchez 63'
22 March 2025	(Mexico) Atlante	H	1–0	Calderón 58'
7 June 2025	(United States) San Diego FC	A	0–3	

== Competitions ==
=== Overview ===
Competition	First match	Last match	Starting round	Final position	Record							
Competition	First match	Last match	Starting round	Final position	Pld	W	D	L	GF	GA	GD	Win %
Apertura	6 July 2024	15 December 2024	Matchday 1	Winners	24	12	6	6	40	28	+12	50.00
Clausura	10 January 2025	25 May 2025	Matchday 1	Runners-up	23	12	6	5	38	14	+24	52.17
Supercopa de la Liga MX	30 June 2024		Final	Winners	1	1	0	0	2	1	+1	100.00
Leagues Cup	9 August 2024	17 August 2024	Round of 32	Quarter-finals	3	2	1	0	6	3	+3	66.67
Campeones Cup	25 September 2024		Final	Winners	1	0	1	0	1	1	+0	0.00
CONCACAF Champions Cup	5 March 2025	8 April 2025	Round of 16	Quarter-finals	4	1	1	2	5	3	+2	25.00
FIFA Club World Cup	31 May 2025		Play-in match	Play-in match	1	0	0	1	1	2	−1	0.00
Total					57	28	15	14	93	52	+41	49.12

Source: Competitions

==== Apertura 2024 ====
Overall								Home						Away					
Pld	W	D	L	GF	GA	GD	Pts	W	D	L	GF	GA	GD	W	D	L	GF	GA	GD
24	12	6	6	40	28	+12	42	8	1	2	18	6	+12	4	5	4	22	22	0

Source: Liga MX

==== Clausura 2025 ====
Overall								Home						Away					
Pld	W	D	L	GF	GA	GD	Pts	W	D	L	GF	GA	GD	W	D	L	GF	GA	GD
23	12	6	5	38	14	+24	42	7	4	1	26	6	+20	5	2	4	12	8	+4

Source: Liga MX

== Apertura 2024 ==
=== League table ===
Pos	Team	Pld	W	D	L	GF	GA	GD	Pts	Qualification
6	Atlético San Luis	17	9	3	5	27	19	+8	30	Qualification for the quarter–finals (Note: The first six places in the table will qualify for the Liguilla quarter-finals.)
7	Tijuana	17	8	5	4	24	25	−1	29	Qualification for the play-in round (Note: Teams ranked 7th to 10th will qualify for the play-in round.)
8	América (C)	17	8	3	6	27	21	+6	27	Qualification for the play-in round
9	Guadalajara	17	7	4	6	24	15	+9	25	Qualification for the play-in round
10	Atlas	17	5	7	5	17	23	−6	22	Qualification for the play-in round

Source: Liga MX
Rules for classification: 1) Points; 2) Goal difference; 3) Number of goals scored; 4) Head-to-head results between tied teams; 5) Number of goals scored away; 6) Highest relegation coefficient; 7) Fair Play points
(C) Champions

==== Results by matchday ====
Round	1	2	3	4	5	6	7	8	9	10	11	12	13	14	15	16	17
Ground	A	H	A	A	H	A	H	H	A	H	A	H	A	H	A	H	A
Result	L	W	L	W	L	L	W	W	D	L	D	W	D	W	W	W	L
Position	12	8	13	9	12	12	12	10	10	11	10	10	10	9	8	6	8
Points	0	3	3	6	6	6	9	12	13	13	14	17	18	21	24	27	27

Source: Liga MX
A = Away; H = Home; W = Win; D = Draw; L = Loss; P = Postponed

=== Regular phase ===
6 July 2024 1	Atlético San Luis	2–1	América	San Luis Potosí
17:00 CT	Klimowicz 7', 50'; Domínguez (yellow card) 76'; Galdames (yellow card) 88'; Durado (yellow card) 90+5'	Report	Martín 5'; Dilrosun (yellow card) 44'; D. Reyes (yellow card) 90+1'	Stadium: Estadio Alfonso Lastras; Attendance: 21,480; Referee: Iván Antonio López Sánchez

12 July 2024 2	América	3–1	Querétaro	Mexico City
19:00 CT	Dilrosun 2'; Martín 8', 56'; Jardine (yellow card) 90'; I. Reyes (yellow card) 90+2'	Report	S. Hernandez (yellow card) 13'; Barrera 45+3'; Manzanarez (yellow card) 65'	Stadium: Estadio Ciudad de los Deportes; Attendance: 9,997; Referee: Katia Itzel García Mendoza

17 July 2024 3	UANL	1–0	América	San Nicolás de los Garza
21:00 CT	Ibáñez (yellow card) 27'; Angulo (yellow card) 56'; Flores 87'; Pizarro (yellow card) 90'	Report	Calderón (yellow card) 40'	Stadium: Estadio Universitario; Attendance: 41,615; Referee: Fernando Guerrero Ramírez

20 July 2024 4	Juárez	1–2	América	Ciudad Juárez
21:10 CT	A. García 4'; Hurtado (yellow card) 73'	Report	Martín 21'; Aguirre 90+2'	Stadium: Estadio Olímpico Benito Juárez; Attendance: 14,917; Referee: Maximiliano Quintero Hernández

24 August 2024 5	América	0–1	Puebla	Mexico City
21:05 CT		Report	P. González (yellow card) 14'; Castillo 74'	Stadium: Estadio Ciudad de los Deportes; Attendance: 11,978; Referee: Luis Enrique Santander Aguirre

31 August 2024 6	Cruz Azul	4–1	América	Mexico City
21:10 CT	Romo (yellow card) 39'; Giakoumakis 44'; Sepúlveda 45+3'; Rotondi (yellow card) 50'; Lira (yellow card) 62'; Anselmi (yellow card) 63'; Gutiérrez 79'; Faravelli 90'	Report	B. Rodríguez 17'; Malagón (yellow card) 34'; dos Santos (yellow card) 52'; Araujo (yellow card) 71'	Stadium: Estadio Ciudad de los Deportes; Attendance: 25,282; Referee: César Arturo Ramos

14 September 2024 7	América	1–0	Guadalajara	Mexico City
18:50 CT	Juárez 31'; Dilrosun (yellow card) 36'; dos Santos (yellow card) 58'; Calderón (yellow card) 89'	Report	F. González (yellow card) 45+1'; Briseño (yellow card) 48'	Stadium: Estadio Ciudad de los Deportes; Attendance: 26,040; Referee: Víctor Alfonso Cáceres Hernández

17 September 2024 8	América	3–0	Atlas	Mexico City
19:00 CT	R. Aguirre 9' (yellow card) 35'; Dávila 55'; Rodríguez 77'; Juárez (yellow card) 90+4'; Zendejas (yellow card) 90+5'	Report	G. Aguirre (yellow card) 18' (yellow-red card) 27'; C. Cruz (yellow card) 90'	Stadium: Estadio Ciudad de los Deportes; Attendance: 10,236; Referee: Adonai Escobedo González

21 September 2024 9	Necaxa	1–1	América	Aguascalientes
19:00 CT	Palavecino 39' (yellow card) 80'; A. Montes (yellow card) 60'; Alcántar (yellow card) 73'; Unsain (yellow card) 83'; Monreal (yellow card) 90+11'	Report	Martín 90+5'; Aguirre (yellow card) 90+5'; É. Sánchez (yellow card) 90+11'	Stadium: Estadio Victoria; Attendance: 20,147; Referee: Óscar Mejía García

29 September 2024 10	América	0–1	UNAM	Mexico City
17:00 CT	Aguirre (yellow card) 28'; R. Sánchez (red card) 90+5'	Report	Ergas (yellow card) 15'; Quispe 19'; Silva (yellow card) 76'; Caicedo (yellow card) 90'	Stadium: Estadio Ciudad de los Deportes; Attendance: 23,401; Referee: Fernando Hernández Gómez

5 October 2024 11	León	1–1	América	León
19:00 CT	Mendoza (yellow card) 17' (goal) 45+2'; Cádiz (yellow card) 28'; Guardado (yellow card) 29'	Report	dos Santos (yellow card) 32'; Vázquez (yellow card) 38'; Juárez (yellow card) 71'; Dilrosun (yellow card) 75'; Aguirre 78' (yellow card) 80'; Zendejas (yellow card) 90+2'	Stadium: Estadio León; Attendance: 17,945; Referee: César Arturo Ramos Palazuelos

19 October 2024 12	América	3–0	Santos Laguna	Mexico City
19:05 CT	Martín 77'; Hernández 83'; H. Rodríguez 86' (o.g.); Álvarez (yellow card) 89'	Report	Aquino (yellow card) 29'; Prieto (yellow card) 37'; Govea (red card) 60'; Loroña (yellow card) 70'	Stadium: Estadio Ciudad de los Deportes; Attendance: 24,110; Referee: Jesús Rafael López Valle

23 October 2024 13	Tijuana	2–2	América	Tijuana
21:05 PT	Rivera 45+7' (pen.); Blanco 47'	Report	Zendejas 25'; Reyes (yellow card) 67'; Aguirre 69'; Calderón (yellow card) 90+2'	Stadium: Estadio Caliente; Attendance: 27,333; Referee: Fernando Hernández Gómez

27 October 2024 14	América	2–1	Monterrey	Mexico City
20:05 CT	B. Rodríguez 49'; Zendejas (yellow card) 81'; Fidalgo 89'	Report	Medina (yellow card) 62'; Ambríz (yellow card) 77'; Moreno (yellow card) 85'; Cortizo 87'	Stadium: Estadio Ciudad de los Deportes; Attendance: 23,810; Referee: Daniel Quintero Huitrón

1 November 2024 15	Mazatlán	0–5	América	Mazatlán
21:00 CT	Colula (yellow card) 50'	Report	Martín 25', 45+5'; Aguirre 29'; Rodríguez 35'; Reyes 79'	Stadium: Estadio de Mazatlán; Attendance: 16,325; Referee: Adonai Escobedo González

6 November 2024 16	América	2–1	Pachuca	Puebla
19:00 CT	Aguirre (yellow card) 21'; Zendejas 42'; Cervantes 46'	Report	Deossa (yellow card) 9'; A. González 16'; C. Sánchez (yellow card) 23'; Berreto (yellow card) 45+4'	Stadium: Estadio Cuauhtémoc; Attendance: 40,814; Referee: Fernando Guerrero Ramírez
Note: Match moved to Estadio Cuauhtémoc due to the closure of Estadio Ciudad de los Deportes.

9 November 2024 17	Toluca	4–0	América	Toluca
19:00 CT	Gallardo 9'; Baeza (yellow card) 35'; Angulo 58'; Paulinho 72'; Lua. Garcia 77'	Report		Stadium: Estadio Nemesio Díez; Attendance: 27,273; Referee: Víctor Alfonso Cáceres Hernández

==== Goalscorers ====
Position	Nation	Name	Goals scored
1.	(Mexico)	Henry Martín	8
2.	(Uruguay)	Rodrigo Aguirre	5
3.	(Uruguay)	Brian Rodríguez	4
4.	(United States)	Alejandro Zendejas	2
5.	(Mexico)	Alan Cervantes	1
5.	(Chile)	Víctor Dávila	1
5.	(Netherlands)	Javairô Dilrosun	1
5.	(Spain)	Álvaro Fidalgo	1
5.	(Mexico)	Illian Hernández	1
5.	(Mexico)	Ramón Juárez	1
5.	(Mexico)	Israel Reyes	1
5.		Own goal	1
Total			27

=== Final phase ===
==== Play-in ====
21 November 2024 Serie A	Tijuana	2–2 (2–3 p)	América	Tijuana
19:00 PT	Fernández (yellow card) 12'; Bilbao 15'; Zúñiga 53'; Balanta (yellow card) 67'; Díaz (red card) 74'; Gómez (yellow card) 90+3'	Report	Zendejas (yellow card) 17'; Rodríguez 51'; Borja 90+1'	Stadium: Estadio Caliente; Attendance: 29,333; Referee: Adonai Escobedo González
	Penalties
	Rivera (penalty missed); Reynoso (penalty missed); Bilbao (penalty scored); Gómez (penalty scored); Mejía (penalty missed)		(penalty scored) Rodríguez; (penalty scored) Reyes; (penalty missed) Zendejas; (penalty missed) Fidalgo; (penalty scored) Aguirre

==== Quarter-finals ====
27 November 2024 First leg	América	2–0	Toluca	Mexico City
19:00 CT	Aguirre 67', 82'	Report	Violante (yellow card) 21'	Stadium: Estadio Ciudad de los Deportes; Attendance: 27,025; Referee: Óscar Mejía García

30 November 2024 Second leg	Toluca	0–2 (0–4 agg.)	América	Toluca
17:00 CT	Pereira (yellow card) 80' (yellow-red card) 84'; Helinho (yellow card) 90+4'	Report	Juárez (yellow card) 29'; Aguirre (yellow card) 32'; Ruiz 49' (o.g.); Martín 72'	Stadium: Estadio Nemesio Díez; Attendance: 27,273; Referee: César Arturo Ramos

==== Semi-finals ====
5 December 2024 First leg	América	0–0	Cruz Azul	Mexico City
20:00 CT	Jardine (yellow card) 67'	Report	Piovi (yellow card) 88'	Stadium: Estadio Ciudad de los Deportes; Attendance: 29,401; Referee: Óscar Mejía García

8 December 2024 Second leg	Cruz Azul	3–4 (3–4 agg.)	América	Mexico City
19:00 CT	Faravelli (yellow card) 42'; Ditta (yellow card) 66'; C. Rodríguez (yellow card) 66'; Rivero 68'; Fernández 80'; A. Morales 86' (yellow card) 88'	Report	Zendejas 15'; R. Sánchez 49'; Borja (yellow card) 59'; Juárez 72'; Aguirre 90+4' (pen.), (yellow card) 90+5' (yellow-red card) 90+8'	Stadium: Estadio Ciudad de los Deportes; Attendance: 29,404; Referee: Adonai Escobedo González

==== Final ====
12 December 2024 First leg	América	2–1	Monterrey	Puebla
20:00 CT	Álvarez 39'; Zendejas 49'; dos Santos (yellow card) 59'; Juárez (yellow card) 81'	Report	Canales 35'; Torres (yellow card) 73'	Stadium: Estadio Cuauhtémoc; Attendance: 36,933; Referee: Víctor Alfonso Cáceres

15 December 2024 Second leg	Monterrey	1–1 (2–3 agg.)	América	Guadalupe
19:00 CT	Arteaga (yellow card) 18'; J. Rojas 85'	Report	R. Sánchez 24'; Zendejas (yellow card) 89'	Stadium: Estadio BBVA; Attendance: 52,127; Referee: César Arturo Ramos

==== Goalscorers ====
Position	Nation	Name	Goals scored
1.	(Uruguay)	Rodrigo Aguirre	3
2.	(Paraguay)	Richard Sánchez	2
2.	(United States)	Alejandro Zendejas	2
3.	(Mexico)	Kevin Álvarez	1
3.	(Colombia)	Cristian Borja	1
3.	(Mexico)	Ramón Juárez	1
3.	(Mexico)	Henry Martín	1
3.	(Uruguay)	Brian Rodríguez	1
3.		Own goal	1
Total			13

== Clausura 2025 ==
=== League table ===
Pos	Team	Pld	W	D	L	GF	GA	GD	Pts	Qualification
1	Toluca (C)	17	11	4	2	41	22	+19	37	Qualification for the quarter–finals (Note: The first six places in the table will qualify for the Liguilla quarter-finals.)
2	América	17	10	4	3	34	10	+24	34	Qualification for the quarter–finals
3	Cruz Azul	17	9	6	2	26	16	+10	33	Qualification for the quarter–finals
4	Tigres	17	10	3	4	24	14	+10	33	Qualification for the quarter–finals
5	Necaxa	17	10	1	6	36	29	+7	31	Qualification for the quarter–finals

Updated to match(es) played on 20 April 2025. Source: Liga MX
Rules for classification: 1) Points; 2) Goal difference; 3) Number of goals scored; 4) Head-to-head results between tied teams; 5) Number of goals scored away; 6) Highest relegation coefficient; 7) Fair Play points
(C) Champions

==== Results by matchday ====
Round	1	2	3	4	5	6	7	9^{1}	8	10	11	12	13	14	15	16	17
Ground	A	H	A	H	H	A	H	H	A	H	A	A	H	A	H	A	H
Result	W	D	W	W	W	W	L	D	W	W	D	W	W	L	D	L	W
Position	4	3	1	3	2	1	2	2	2	2	2	1	1	1	2	3	2
Points	3	4	7	10	13	16	16	17	20	23	24	27	30	30	31	31	34

Source: Liga MX
A = Away; H = Home; W = Win; D = Draw; L = Loss; P = Postponed
Notes:
- ^{1} Matchday 9 (v. León) was moved forward due to América's involvement in the CONCACAF Champions Cup.

=== Regular phase ===
10 January 2025 1	Querétaro	0–1	América	Querétaro
19:00 CT	Russo (yellow card) 39' (yellow-red card) 44'; C. Castillo (yellow card) 45+1'	Report	D. Arriaga (yellow card) 35'; A. Álvarez 64'	Stadium: Estadio Corregidora; Attendance: 29,822; Referee: Jesús Rafael López Valle

16 January 2025 2	América	1–1	Tijuana	Mexico City
20:10 CT	Lozano 61'; C. Vela (yellow card) 90+2'	Report	Hernández 37'; Julio (yellow card) 84'; Blanco (yellow card) 89'; R. Franco (yellow card) 90+4'	Stadium: Estadio Ciudad de los Deportes; Attendance: 15,449; Referee: Katia Itzel García

25 January 2025 3	Santos Laguna	1–4	América	Torreón
21:00 CT	G. Pérez (yellow card) 20'; E. Echeverría (yellow card) 48'; Santamaría (yellow card) 52'; Lozano 90+4' (pen.)	Report	Dávila 35'; É. Sánchez 45'; Zendejas 61', 68'; M. Ramírez (yellow card) 74'	Stadium: Estadio Corona; Attendance: 21,406; Referee: Fernando Hernández Gómez

28 January 2025 4	América	3–0	Atlético San Luis	Mexico City
19:00 CT	Dávila 16', 43'; Fidalgo 49'	Report	Vitinho (yellow card) 24'	Stadium: Estadio Ciudad de los Deportes; Attendance: 21,306; Referee: Jorge Abraham Camacho Peregrina

1 February 2025 5	América	4–0	Juárez	Mexico City
17:00 CT	Dávila 29'; É Sánchez 45'; B. Rodríguez 66', 81'	Report	Mosquera (yellow card) 39'	Stadium: Estadio Ciudad de los Deportes; Attendance: 27,623; Referee: César Arturo Ramos

7 February 2025 6	Puebla	1–2	América	Puebla
21:00 CT	J. Pachuca (yellow card) 10'; Waller (yellow card) 15'; Rivas (yellow card) 25'; Angulo (red card) 37'; Marín 74'; Gularte (yellow card) 76'	Report	Zendejas 13'; Espinoza (yellow card) 24'; Martín 38'	Stadium: Estadio Cuauhtémoc; Attendance: 36,335; Referee: Ismael Rosario Lopez

14 February 2025 7	América	2–3	Necaxa	Mexico City
21:00 CT	Espinoza (yellow card) 12'; É. Sánchez (yellow card) 43'; Fidalgo 50', 59'; Álvarez (red card) 80'	Report	Paradela 3'; Cambindo (yellow card) 11' (goal) 31'; Rosero 90+9'	Stadium: Estadio Ciudad de los Deportes; Attendance: 25,753; Referee: Óscar Mejía García
Note: Fixture was initially scheduled for a 19:00 kick-off on 15 February, but was moved to 21:00 kick-off on 14 February due to an event being held at the Plaza de Toros México.

19 February 2025 9	América	1–1	León	Mexico City
21:00 CT	Zendejas 11'; Espinoza (yellow card) 52'	Report	J. Rodríguez 33'; Bellón (yellow card) 38'; Jiménez (yellow card) 90+5'; Guardado (yellow card) 90+6'; Echeverría (yellow card) 90+7'	Stadium: Estadio Ciudad de los Deportes; Attendance: 29,543; Referee: César Arturo Ramos
Note: Fixture was moved forward due to América's participation in the CONCACAF Champions Cup.

22 February 2025 8	UNAM	0–2	América	Mexico City
21:00 CT	Trigos (yellow card) 8'; Carrasquilla (yellow card) 15'; Pussetto (yellow card) 43'; Quispe (red card) 45+3'	Report	Reyes 23'; Fidalgo 48'	Stadium: Estadio Olímpico Universitario; Attendance: 38,246; Referee: Fernando Hernández Gómez

1 March 2025 10	América	3–0	Toluca	Mexico City
17:00 CT	Fidalgo 6'; Rodríguez (yellow card) 16'; Zendejas 51'; Juárez (yellow card) 57'; Borja 90+6'	Report	Paulinho (yellow card) 57'	Stadium: Estadio Ciudad de los Deportes; Attendance: 29,222; Referee: Jesús Rafael López Valle
Note: Fixture was initially scheduled for a 19:00 kick-off, but was moved to 17:00 kick-off due to various public events being held at Mexico City.

8 March 2025 11	Guadalajara	0–0	América	Zapopan
21:05 CT	Chávez (yellow card) 41'; González (yellow card) 48'; Mozo (yellow card) 62'; Cowell (red card) 70'	Report	Rodríguez (yellow card) 68'	Stadium: Estadio Akron; Attendance: 41,003; Referee: Adonai Escobedo González

15 March 2025 12	Atlas	1–3	América	Guadalajara
21:05 CT	Rocha (yellow card) 50'; Đurđević 65'; González (yellow card) 73'; Cóccaro (yellow card) 90+5'; Nervo (yellow card) 90+12'	Report	Juárez (yellow card) 15'; R. Aguirre 47', 74'; Calderón 50'	Stadium: Estadio Jalisco; Attendance: 34,787; Referee: Oscar Mejía García

29 March 2025 13	América	3–0	UANL	Mexico City
19:05 CT	Cervantes (yellow card) 28'; B. Rodríguez 32', 45+6' (pen.); Calderón (yellow card) 47'; Álvarez (yellow card) 52'; Dávila 63'; Zendejas (yellow card) 71'; Aguirre (yellow card) 81'	Report	Brunetta (yellow card) 45+1'; Joaquim (yellow card) 45+1'	Stadium: Estadio Ciudad de los Deportes; Attendance: 29,397; Referee: Víctor Alfonso Cáceres Hernández

5 April 2025 14	Pachuca	1–0	América	Pachuca
17:00 CT	Rondón 20'; Aceves (yellow card) 64'; Pedraza (yellow card) 65'; Bauermann (yellow card) 81'; Homenchenko (yellow card) 90+2'; B. González (red card) 90+12'	Report	dos Santos (yellow card) 66'; Fidalgo (yellow card) 90+3'; Juárez (yellow card) 90+3'	Stadium: Estadio Hidalgo; Attendance: 22,186; Referee: Fernando Hernández Gómez
Note: Due to a legal dispute between Grupo Pachuca and Grupo Lauman, the owner of Fox Sports Mexico, the fixture was not broadcast.

12 April 2025 15	América	0–0	Cruz Azul	Mexico City
21:15 CT		Report	Bogusz (yellow card) 68'	Stadium: Estadio Ciudad de los Deportes; Attendance: 24,520; Referee: César Arturo Ramos

16 April 2025 16	Monterrey	1–0	América	Guadalupe
19:00 CT	Cortizo (yellow card) 30'; I. Fimbres (yellow card) 54'; Deossa 75'; Corona (yellow card) 90+1'	Report	Zendejas (yellow card) 31'; Fidalgo (yellow card) 90+5'	Stadium: Estadio BBVA; Attendance: 49,098; Referee: Daniel Quintero Huitrón

19 April 2025 17	América	5–0	Mazatlán	Mexico City
17:00 CT	Dávila 4', 51' (pen.); Fidalgo 13', 59'; Aguirre 75'	Report	Merolla (yellow card) 24'; Meraz (yellow card) 24'; Díaz (yellow card) 39'; S. Rodríguez (yellow card) 90+4'	Stadium: Estadio Ciudad de los Deportes; Attendance: 28,252; Referee: Katia Itzel García

==== Goalscorers ====
Position	Nation	Name	Goals scored
1.	(Chile)	Víctor Dávila	7
1.	(Spain)	Álvaro Fidalgo	7
2.	(United States)	Alejandro Zendejas	5
3.	(Uruguay)	Brian Rodríguez	4
4.	(Uruguay)	Rodrigo Aguirre	3
5.	(Mexico)	Érick Sánchez	2
6.	(Mexico)	Antonio Álvarez	1
6.	(Colombia)	Cristian Borja	1
6.	(Mexico)	Cristian Calderón	1
6.	(Mexico)	Esteban Lozano	1
6.	(Mexico)	Henry Martín	1
6.	(Mexico)	Israel Reyes	1
Total			34

=== Final phase ===
==== Quarter-finals ====
7 May 2025 First leg	Pachuca	0–0	América	Pachuca
21:10 CT	Berlanga (yellow card) 13'; Bauermann (yellow card) 45+3'; Kennedy (yellow card) 79'	Report	Dávila (yellow card) 23'; Cáceres (yellow card) 41'; Dilrosun (yellow card) 90+5'	Stadium: Estadio Hidalgo; Attendance: 13,925; Referee: Jesús Rafael López Valle

10 May 2025 Second leg	América	2–0 (2–0 agg.)	Pachuca	Mexico City
21:10 CT	Zendejas 16', 28'; Dávila (yellow card) 71'; Calderón (yellow card) 75'; Aguirre (penalty missed) 90+3'	Report	Aceves (yellow card) 18'; Idrissi (yellow card) 31' (yellow-red card) 45+2'; Pedraza (yellow card) 44'; B. González (yellow card) 61'	Stadium: Estadio Ciudad de los Deportes; Attendance: 25,417; Referee: Katia Itzel García

==== Semi-finals ====
15 May 2025 First leg	Cruz Azul	1–0	América	Mexico City
20:00 CT	Rivero 59' (red card) 66'	Report	Zendejas (yellow card) 90+2'	Stadium: Estadio Olímpico Universitario; Attendance: 34,951; Referee: Luis Enrique Santander

18 May 2025 Second leg	América	2–1 (2 (s)–2 agg.)	Cruz Azul	Mexico City
19:15 CT	Martín 66' (pen.); Borja 79', (yellow card) 80'	Report	Ditta (yellow card) 36'; Faravelli (yellow card) 45+1', (goal) 57'	Stadium: Estadio Ciudad de los Deportes; Attendance: 30,872; Referee: Víctor Cáceres Hernández

==== Final ====
22 May 2025 First leg	América	0–0	Toluca	Mexico City
20:00 CT	Cáceres (yellow card) 29'; Dávila (yellow card) 48'	Report	L. Garcia (yellow card) 11'; Pereira (yellow card) 55'	Stadium: Estadio Ciudad de los Deportes; Attendance: 30,406; Referee: Daniel Quintero Huitrón

25 May 2025 Second leg	Toluca	2–0 (2–0 agg.)	América	Toluca
19:00 CT	Lua. Garcia 66'; Vega 82' (pen.), (yellow card) 90+4'; Lui. García (yellow card) 90'	Report	Cácares (yellow card) 78'	Stadium: Estadio Nemesio Díez; Attendance: 27,273; Referee: César Arturo Ramos

==== Goalscorers ====
Position	Nation	Name	Goals scored
1.	(United States)	Alejandro Zendejas	2
2.	(Colombia)	Cristian Borja	1
2.	(Mexico)	Henry Martín	1
Total			4

== Supercopa de la Liga MX ==
30 June 2024 Final	América	2–1	UANL	Carson, United States
13:30 PDT	Dilrosun 24'; Martín 35'; Naveda (yellow card) 59'	Report	Brunetta 7'; Pizarro (yellow card) 34'; Angulo (yellow card) 63'	Stadium: Dignity Health Sports Park; Attendance: 26,791; Referee: Ismael Rosario López

== CONCACAF Champions Cup ==
=== Round of 16 ===
5 March 2025 First leg	Guadalajara (Mexico)	1–0	(Mexico) América	Zapopan, Mexico
19:30 CT	Mozo (yellow card) 45+2'; Sepúlveda (yellow card) 56'; Cáceres 77' (o.g.); Chávez (yellow card) 81'	Report	Zendejas (yellow card) 76'	Stadium: Estadio Akron; Attendance: 41,695; Referee: Drew Fischer (Canada)

12 March 2025 Second leg	América (Mexico)	4–0 (4–1 agg.)	(Mexico) Guadalajara	Mexico City, Mexico
20:30 CT	Rodríguez 6'; Valdés 45'; Zendejas 65'; Fidalgo 79'	Report	Mozo (yellow card) 14' (yellow-red card) 46'; F. González (yellow card) 74'	Stadium: Estadio Ciudad de los Deportes; Attendance: 29,391; Referee: Walter López (Guatemala)

=== Quarter-finals ===
1 April 2025 First leg	América (Mexico)	0–0	(Mexico) Cruz Azul	Mexico City, Mexico
19:15 CT	Aguirre (yellow card) 86'	Report	Rivero (yellow card) 12'; Ditta (yellow card) 75'; Sánchez (yellow card) 88'	Stadium: Estadio Ciudad de los Deportes; Attendance: 19,720; Referee: Joe Dickerson (United States)

8 April 2025 Second leg	Cruz Azul (Mexico)	2–1 (2–1 agg.)	(Mexico) América	Mexico City, Mexico
21:30 CT	Piovi (yellow card) 9'; Sepúlveda 12', 85', (yellow card) 86'; Faravelli (yellow card) 36'; Lira (yellow card) 63'	Report	Valdés (yellow card) 29'; Juárez (yellow card) 35'; Fidalgo 57'; Araújo (yellow card) 88'	Stadium: Estadio Olímpico Universitario; Attendance: 27,923; Referee: Ismael Cornejo (El Salvador)

== FIFA Club World Cup ==
Originally, León, winners of the 2023 CONCACAF Champions League, were set to participate in the tournament. On 21 March, 2025, the FIFA Appeal Committee expelled the team from the tournament for breaching regulations on multi-club ownership, citing that both León and Pachuca are owned by the same entity. On 6 May, the Court of Arbitration for Sport dismissed the appeals filed by León, Pachuca, and Alajuelense, who had initially taken the case to FIFA. FIFA upheld León’s expulsion, confirming that their place in the Club World Cup would be given to the winner of a playoff match between Los Angeles FC—2023 CONCACAF Champions League runners-up—and América, the highest-ranked team in the CONCACAF confederation.

=== Play-in match ===
31 May 2025 Play-in match	Los Angeles FC (United States)	2–1 (a.e.t.)	(Mexico) América	Los Angeles, United States
19:30 PT	Igor Jesus (yellow card) 59', (goal) 89'; Delgado (yellow card) 63'; Palencia (yellow card) 66'; Amaya (yellow card) 104'; Tillman (yellow card) 110'; Bouanga 115'	Report	Cáceres (yellow card) 19'; Rodríguez 64' (pen.); Zendejas (yellow card) 89'; Reyes (yellow card) 119'	Stadium: BMO Stadium; Attendance: 20,714; Referee: Wilton Sampaio (Brazil)

== Leagues Cup ==
=== Knockout stage ===
9 August 2024 R32	América (Mexico)	2–1	(Mexico) Atlas	San Diego, United States
22:00 (19:00 UTC−7)	É. Sánchez 20'; Martín 73'; Dilrosun (yellow card) 85'	Report	R. Lozano 59'; Dória (yellow card) 63'; Rocha (yellow card) 67'; L. Reyes (yellow card) 82'; Murillo (yellow card) 90+4'	Stadium: Snapdragon Stadium; Attendance: 21,311; Referee: Oshane Nation (Jamaica)

13 August 2024 R16	América (Mexico)	4–2	(United States) St. Louis City SC	Carson, United States
22:30 (19:30 UTC−7)	Rodríguez 18', 86' (pen.); Valdés (yellow card) 45+3' (goal) 79'; Malagón (yellow card) 90+4'; Aguirre 90+8'	Report	Vassilev 49'; Löwen 55' (pen.)	Stadium: Dignity Health Sports Park; Attendance: 11,553; Referee: Marco Ortiz (Mexico)

17 August 2024 QF	América (Mexico)	0–0 (8–9 p)	(United States) Colorado Rapids	Carson, United States
22:00 (19:00 UTC−7)		Report	Fernandez (yellow card) 28'; Navarro (yellow card) 88'	Stadium: Dignity Health Sports Park; Attendance: 22,462; Referee: Keylor Herrera (Costa Rica)
	Penalties
	Martín (penalty scored); Reyes (penalty scored); Sánchez (penalty scored); Cáceres (penalty scored); Lichnovsky (penalty missed); Calderón (penalty scored); Fidalgo (penalty scored); Hernández (penalty scored); Espinoza (penalty scored); Malagón (penalty missed)		(penalty scored) Mihailovic; (penalty scored) Bassett; (penalty missed) Navarro; (penalty scored) Maxsø; (penalty scored) Ronan; (penalty scored) Rosenberry; (penalty scored) Larraz; (penalty scored) Vines; (penalty scored) Harris; (penalty scored) Steffen

== Campeones Cup ==
25 September 2024 Final	Columbus Crew (United States)	1–1 (4–5 p)	(Mexico) América	Columbus, United States
19:30 EDT (UTC−04:00)	Zawadzki (yellow card) 32'; Amundsen 77'; Cucho (yellow card) 90+1'	Report	Dávila 67'	Stadium: Lower.com Field; Attendance: 20,198; Referee: Walter López Castellanos (Guatemala)
	Penalties
	Camcho (penalty scored); Mățan (penalty missed); Russell-Rowe (penalty scored); Cucho (penalty scored); Jones (penalty scored); Jackson (penalty missed); Amundsen (penalty missed)		Valdés (penalty scored); R. Sánchez (penalty missed); Aguirre (penalty scored); Fidalgo (penalty scored); Dávila (penalty scored); Juárez (penalty missed); Araujo (penalty scored)

== Statistics ==
=== Appearances and goals ===
No.	Pos	Nat	Player	Total		Apertura 2024		Clausura 2025		CONCACAF Champions Cup		FIFA Club World Cup		Leagues Cup		Other competitions (Note: Includes Supercopa de la Liga MX and Campeones Cup)	
No.	Pos	Nat	Player	Apps	Goals	Apps	Goals	Apps	Goals	Apps	Goals	Apps	Goals	Apps	Goals	Apps	Goals
Goalkeepers
1	GK	(Mexico) MEX	Luis Malagón	51	0	23	0	19	0	4	0	1	0	3	0	1	0
12	GK	(Mexico) MEX	Jonathan Estrada	0	0	0	0	0	0	0	0	0	0	0	0	0	0
30	GK	(Mexico) MEX	Rodolfo Cota	7	0	1	0	4+1	0	0	0	0	0	0	0	1	0
Defenders
3	DF	(Mexico) MEX	Israel Reyes	48	2	17+3	1	19+2	1	3	0	1	0	3	0	0	0
4	DF	(Uruguay) URU	Sebastián Cáceres	32	0	9	0	14+2	0	4	0	1	0	2	0	0	0
5	DF	(Mexico) MEX	Kevin Álvarez	41	1	13+3	1	14+4	0	4	0	0	0	3	0	0	0
14	DF	(Mexico) MEX	Néstor Araujo	24	0	12+4	0	2+1	0	0+1	0	0	0	1+1	0	2	0
18	DF	(Mexico) MEX	Cristian Calderón	43	1	15+6	0	9+4	1	0+3	0	0+1	0	1+2	0	2	0
26	DF	(Colombia) COL	Cristian Borja	43	3	10+8	1	12+4	2	4	0	1	0	2+1	0	1	0
29	DF	(Mexico) MEX	Ramón Juárez	45	2	15+2	2	14+6	0	3+1	0	0+1	0	0+1	0	2	0
31	DF	(Chile) CHI	Igor Lichnovsky	4	0	1	0	0	0	0	0	0	0	3	0	0	0
32	DF	(Mexico) MEX	Miguel Vázquez	15	0	6+2	0	4+1	0	0	0	0+1	0	0	0	0+1	0
190	DF	(Mexico) MEX	Patrick Villa	2	0	0	0	0+2	0	0	0	0	0	0	0	0	0
193	DF	(Mexico) MEX	Franco Rossano	5	0	0+2	0	2+1	0	0	0	0	0	0	0	0	0
203	DF	(Israel) ISR	Joshua Strimling	1	0	0	0	1	0	0	0	0	0	0	0	0	0
222	DF	(Mexico) MEX	Daniel Alvarado	1	0	0	0	0+1	0	0	0	0	0	0	0	0	0
Midfielders
6	MF	(Mexico) MEX	Jonathan dos Santos	39	0	14+7	0	9+1	0	1+1	0	0+1	0	3	0	2	0
8	MF	(Spain) ESP	Álvaro Fidalgo	52	10	19+3	1	18+2	7	4	2	1	0	3	0	2	0
10	MF	(Chile) CHI	Diego Valdés	37	2	7+5	0	2+14	0	3+1	1	0+1	0	2+1	1	0+1	0
13	MF	(Mexico) MEX	Alan Cervantes	38	1	11+8	1	8+6	0	1+1	0	1	0	0+2	0	0	0
17	MF	(United States) USA	Alejandro Zendejas	47	12	17+2	4	19+2	7	4	1	1	0	0	0	2	0
24	MF	(Netherlands) NED	Javairô Dilrosun	32	2	7+5	1	4+10	0	0+1	0	0+1	0	2	0	1+1	1
28	MF	(Mexico) MEX	Érick Sánchez	47	3	8+9	0	20+2	2	4	0	1	0	1+2	1	0	0
34	MF	(Mexico) MEX	Dagoberto Espinoza	22	0	5+4	0	6+4	0	0	0	0	0	0+1	0	1+1	0
185	MF	(Mexico) MEX	Aarón Arredondo	2	0	0	0	2	0	0	0	0	0	0	0	0	0
186	MF	(Mexico) MEX	Diego Arriaga	4	0	0	0	2+2	0	0	0	0	0	0	0	0	0
188	MF	(Mexico) MEX	Christo Vela	2	0	0	0	0+2	0	0	0	0	0	0	0	0	0
209	MF	(Mexico) MEX	Wálter Portales	2	0	0	0	1+1	0	0	0	0	0	0	0	0	0
210	MF	(Mexico) MEX	Miguel Ramírez Pérez	8	0	0+1	0	3+3	0	0	0	0	0	0	0	0+1	0
Forwards
7	FW	(Uruguay) URU	Brian Rodríguez	39	13	11+5	5	11+3	4	4	1	0+1	1	3	2	1	0
11	FW	(Chile) CHI	Víctor Dávila	34	9	4+4	1	16+5	7	0+3	0	1	0	0	0	0+1	1
21	FW	(Mexico) MEX	Henry Martín	43	13	18+5	9	10+3	2	2	0	0	0	3	1	2	1
27	FW	(Uruguay) URU	Rodrigo Aguirre	36	12	9+8	8	2+12	3	0+2	0	1	0	0+1	1	0+1	0
35	FW	(Mexico) MEX	Esteban Lozano	5	1	0+1	0	0+3	1	0+1	0	0	0	0	0	0	0
184	FW	(Mexico) MEX	Antonio Álvarez	4	1	0+2	0	2	1	0	0	0	0	0	0	0	0
198	FW	(Mexico) MEX	Francisco García	1	0	0	0	0+1	0	0	0	0	0	0	0	0	0
214	FW	(Mexico) MEX	Patricio Salas	3	0	0+1	0	2	0	0	0	0	0	0	0	0	0
303	FW	(Mexico) MEX	Diego Reyes	2	0	0+2	0	0	0	0	0	0	0	0	0	0	0
Players transferred out during the season
15	MF	(Mexico) MEX	José Iván Rodríguez	1	0	0	0	0	0	0	0	0	0	0	0	0+1	0
16	MF	(Mexico) MEX	Santiago Naveda	1	0	0	0	0	0	0	0	0	0	0	0	1	0
19	FW	(Mexico) MEX	Illian Hernández	9	1	1+7	1	0	0	0	0	0	0	0+1	0	0	0
20	MF	(Paraguay) PAR	Richard Sánchez	23	2	10+2	2	2+4	0	0+1	0	0	0	1+2	0	1	0
23	DF	(Mexico) MEX	Emilio Lara	2	0	1	0	0	0	0	0	0	0	0	0	1	0

Source: Competitions
