= 2025 FIFA Club World Cup qualification =

Qualification process for participants

The 2025 FIFA Club World Cup qualification was the qualifying process which decided the 32 participants in the 2025 FIFA Club World Cup. The final tournament was played in the United States from June 14 to July 13, 2025.

The majority of teams qualified based on performance in their respective confederations' club championships. Only a single play-in match was played as part of qualification, which determined the final team in the Club World Cup.

== Slot allocation ==
On February 14, 2023, the FIFA Council approved the slot allocation for the 2025 tournament based on a "set of objective metrics and criteria". UEFA was awarded the most slots with twelve, while CONMEBOL was given the second most with six. The AFC, CAF, and CONCACAF were all given four slots, while the OFC and the host association were given one slot each. On March 14, the FIFA Council approved the key principles of the access list for the tournament. The principles were as follows, considering competitions completed during a four-year period from 2021 to 2024:

- CONMEBOL and UEFA (more than four slots): access for the winners of the confederation's top club competition between 2021 and 2024, with additional teams determined by a club ranking of the four-year period
- AFC, CAF, and CONCACAF (four slots each): access for the winners of the confederation's top club competition between 2021 and 2024 (Note: As the AFC Champions League was shifted from an intra-year schedule to an inter-year schedule starting from 2023–24, only three seasons of the AFC Champions League were completed within the consideration period of 2021 to 2024. As a result, the remaining slot was allocated using the four-year club ranking.)
- OFC (one slot): access for the highest-ranked club among the winners of the confederation's top club competition between 2021 and 2024 (Note: As the 2021 OFC Champions League was cancelled, the slot was awarded to the best club in the OFC's four-year ranking that won the competition between 2022 and 2024.)
- Host country (one slot): this was determined at a later stage.

If a club won two or more seasons of their confederation's top club competition, additional teams were determined by a club ranking of the four-year period. A restriction of two clubs per association was applied, with an exception for champion clubs if more than two clubs from the same association won their confederation's top club competition. The calculation method for the four-year club rankings within each confederation was based on sporting criteria during seasons completed between 2021 and 2024, and was finalized after consultation with confederations and stakeholders.

=== Host club selection ===
As with previous editions of the Club World Cup, the new format allocated a slot reserved for the host nation. Traditionally, this slot was filled by the defending champion of the host nation. The champion of Major League Soccer was determined by a postseason playoff rather than the regular season record (in the case of the 2024 season, it was the LA Galaxy). The exact qualification method had been left undetermined for an extended period of time into the 2024 regular season. At the mid-season MLS All-Star Game, league commissioner Don Garber suggested that the spot could be filled with the 2024 MLS Supporters' Shield winner, the MLS Cup 2024 winner, or a possible playoff between them.

On October 19, 2024, FIFA president Gianni Infantino appeared on the pitch shortly after Inter Miami CF's 6–2 home win over the New England Revolution on Decision Day, and officially announced that the final slot would be given to Inter Miami as winner of the 2024 Supporters' Shield, prior to the beginning of the 2024 MLS Cup playoffs and after Inter Miami had already won the Shield. The rationale for this was considered to be because the Club World Cup has traditionally taken the host champion through who won silverware in the "league setting." FIFA explained that it chose the Supporters' Shield winner because that award reflects a league setting, as opposed to MLS Cup. It also stated that it made the decision prior to Inter Miami CF's win, but could not announce it until regulations were approved in pre-scheduled conventions.

This decision came under criticism from fans and media pundits for its lack of transparency, lack of qualification by traditional sporting merit, and as an attempt to court sponsors by ensuring that Lionel Messi would feature in the tournament. On November 10, 2024, Inter Miami was eliminated from the MLS Cup playoffs by Atlanta United FC in the first round. Despite this, then-Inter Miami head coach Gerardo Martino defended the selection of the team, arguing that the Supporters' Shield was enough justification for selection.

== Qualified teams ==
The following teams qualified for the tournament: Years in bold indicate winner of that year's Club World Cup.

Confederation	Team(s)	Qualification	Qualified date(s)	Participation
AFC (4 slots)	(Saudi Arabia) Al-Hilal	Winner of the 2021 AFC Champions League	March 14, 2023 (Note: The teams' participation was confirmed on March 14, 2023, with the approval of the access list. However, the teams won the competitions (that eventually qualified them for the Club World Cup) on the following dates: Al Hilal (November 23, 2021), Al Ahly (July 17, 2021), Wydad AC (May 30, 2022), Monterrey (October 28, 2021), Seattle Sounders FC (May 4, 2022), Palmeiras (November 27, 2021), Flamengo (October 29, 2022), Chelsea (May 29, 2021), and Real Madrid (May 28, 2022).)	4th (Previous: 2019, 2021, 2022)
AFC (4 slots)	(Japan) Urawa Red Diamonds	Winner of the 2022 AFC Champions League	May 6, 2023	4th (Previous: 2007, 2017, 2023)
AFC (4 slots)	(United Arab Emirates) Al Ain	Winner of the 2023–24 AFC Champions League	May 25, 2024	2nd (Previous: 2018)
AFC (4 slots)	(South Korea) Ulsan HD	Best-ranked eligible team in the AFC four-year ranking	April 17, 2024	3rd (Previous: 2012, 2020)
CAF (4 slots)	(Egypt) Al Ahly	Winner of the 2020–21 CAF Champions League	March 14, 2023	10th (Previous: 2005, 2006, 2008, 2012, 2013, 2020, 2021, 2022, 2023)
CAF (4 slots)	(Morocco) Wydad AC	Winner of the 2021–22 CAF Champions League	March 14, 2023	3rd (Previous: 2017, 2022)
CAF (4 slots)	(Tunisia) Espérance de Tunis	Best-ranked eligible team in the CAF four-year ranking	April 26, 2024	4th (Previous: 2011, 2018, 2019)
CAF (4 slots)	(South Africa) Mamelodi Sundowns	Second-best ranked eligible team in the CAF four-year ranking	April 26, 2024	2nd (Previous: 2016)
CONCACAF (4 slots)	(Mexico) Monterrey	Winner of the 2021 CONCACAF Champions League	March 14, 2023	6th (Previous: 2011, 2012, 2013, 2019, 2021)
CONCACAF (4 slots)	(United States) Seattle Sounders FC	Winner of the 2022 CONCACAF Champions League	March 14, 2023	2nd (Previous: 2022)
CONCACAF (4 slots)	(Mexico) Pachuca	Winner of the 2024 CONCACAF Champions Cup	June 1, 2024	5th (Previous: 2007, 2008, 2010, 2017)
CONCACAF (4 slots)	(United States) Los Angeles FC (Note: Originally León was set to participate in the tournament as winner of the 2023 CONCACAF Champions League. On March 21, 2025, the team was removed from the competition due to violating the FIFA Appeal Committee's rules on multi-club ownership, as León and Pachuca have the same owner. On May 6, 2025, the Court of Arbitration for Sport rejected appeals by León, Pachuca, and Alajuelense. FIFA confirmed León's exclusion and ordered a one-off match between Los Angeles FC and América to take place, the winner of which would qualify for the Club World Cup. On May 31, Los Angeles FC beat América 2–1 in extra time to claim the final tournament spot.)	Winner of play-in match	May 31, 2025	1st
CONMEBOL (6 slots)	(Brazil) Palmeiras	Winner of the 2021 Copa Libertadores	March 14, 2023	3rd (Previous: 2020, 2021)
CONMEBOL (6 slots)	(Brazil) Flamengo	Winner of the 2022 Copa Libertadores	March 14, 2023	3rd (Previous: 2019, 2022)
CONMEBOL (6 slots)	(Brazil) Fluminense	Winner of the 2023 Copa Libertadores	November 4, 2023	2nd (Previous: 2023)
CONMEBOL (6 slots)	(Brazil) Botafogo	Winner of the 2024 Copa Libertadores	November 30, 2024	1st
CONMEBOL (6 slots)	(Argentina) River Plate	Best-ranked eligible team in the CONMEBOL four-year ranking	May 14, 2024	3rd (Previous: 2015, 2018)
CONMEBOL (6 slots)	(Argentina) Boca Juniors	Second-best ranked eligible team in the CONMEBOL four-year ranking	August 22, 2024	2nd (Previous: 2007)
OFC (1 slot)	(New Zealand) Auckland City	Best OFC Champions League winner in the OFC four-year ranking	December 17, 2023	12th (Previous: 2006, 2009, 2011, 2012, 2013, 2014, 2015, 2016, 2017, 2022, 2023)
UEFA (12 slots)	(England) Chelsea	Winner of the 2020–21 UEFA Champions League	March 14, 2023	3rd (Previous: 2012, **2021**)
UEFA (12 slots)	(Spain) Real Madrid	Winner of the 2021–22 UEFA Champions League	March 14, 2023	7th (Previous: 2000, **2014**, **2016**, **2017**, **2018**, **2022**)
UEFA (12 slots)	(England) Manchester City	Winner of the 2022–23 UEFA Champions League	June 10, 2023	2nd (Previous: **2023**)
UEFA (12 slots)	(Germany) Bayern Munich	Best ranked eligible team in the UEFA four-year ranking	December 17, 2023 (Note: Five eligible teams qualified on December 17, 2023, via four-year confederation rankings, when the qualifying procedure was confirmed. These teams were both guaranteed a place in the top eight and could not be made ineligible by two teams from their own national association accumulating more points.)	3rd (Previous: **2013**, **2020**)
UEFA (12 slots)	(France) Paris Saint-Germain	Second-best ranked eligible team in the UEFA four-year ranking	December 17, 2023	1st
UEFA (12 slots)	(Italy) Inter Milan	Fourth-best ranked eligible team in the UEFA four-year ranking	December 17, 2023	2nd (Previous: **2010**)
UEFA (12 slots)	(Portugal) Porto	Fifth-best ranked eligible team in the UEFA four-year ranking	December 17, 2023	1st
UEFA (12 slots)	(Portugal) Benfica	Seventh-best ranked eligible team in the UEFA four-year ranking	December 17, 2023	1st
UEFA (12 slots)	(Germany) Borussia Dortmund	Third-best ranked eligible team in the UEFA four-year ranking	March 6, 2024	1st
UEFA (12 slots)	(Italy) Juventus	Eighth-best ranked eligible team in the UEFA four-year ranking	March 12, 2024	1st
UEFA (12 slots)	(Spain) Atlético Madrid	Sixth-best ranked eligible team in the UEFA four-year ranking	April 16, 2024	1st
UEFA (12 slots)	(Austria) Red Bull Salzburg	Ninth-best ranked eligible team in the UEFA four-year ranking	April 17, 2024	1st
Host (1 slot)	(United States) Inter Miami CF	Winner of the 2024 MLS Supporters' Shield	October 19, 2024	1st

=== By nation ===
Nation	Clubs
Brazil (4)	Botafogo
Brazil (4)	Flamengo
Brazil (4)	Fluminense
Brazil (4)	Palmeiras
United States (3)	Inter Miami CF
United States (3)	Los Angeles FC
United States (3)	Seattle Sounders FC
Argentina (2)	Boca Juniors
Argentina (2)	River Plate
England (2)	Chelsea
England (2)	Manchester City
Germany (2)	Bayern Munich
Germany (2)	Borussia Dortmund
Italy (2)	Inter Milan
Italy (2)	Juventus
Mexico (2)	Monterrey
Mexico (2)	Pachuca
Portugal (2)	Benfica
Portugal (2)	Porto
Spain (2)	Atlético Madrid
Spain (2)	Real Madrid
Austria (1)	Red Bull Salzburg
Egypt (1)	Al Ahly
France (1)	Paris Saint-Germain
Japan (1)	Urawa Red Diamonds
Morocco (1)	Wydad AC
New Zealand (1)	Auckland City
Saudi Arabia (1)	Al-Hilal
South Africa (1)	Mamelodi Sundowns
South Korea (1)	Ulsan HD
Tunisia (1)	Espérance de Tunis
United Arab Emirates (1)	Al Ain

== Confederation qualification ==
For confederations other than UEFA, the method was as follows:

- 3 points for a win
- 1 point for a draw
- 3 points for successful progression to each new stage of the competition

The method used by UEFA to calculate the club coefficient was "exceptionally applied" to rank the European teams, (Note: The system was only applied over a four year timeframe, instead of the usual five years, applied only to the Champions League competition.) and was as follows:

- 2 points for a win
- 1 point for a draw
- 4 points for qualification for the group stage
- 5 points for qualification for the round of 16
- 1 point for progress to each stage of the competition thereafter

Key
Qualified as the host
Qualified through winning the competition
Qualified through the confederation ranking
Qualified through the play-in match

=== AFC Champions League Elite ===
Table showing the top ten in the AFC rankings, as well as other relevant teams. One team qualified through the confederation ranking method.

AFC ranking
Rank	Team	Total points	Competition points	Match points	W	D	L	Performance		
Rank	Team	Total points	Competition points	Match points	W	D	L	2021	2022	2023–24
1	(Saudi Arabia) Al-Hilal	118	42	76	24	4	5	Champion	Final	Semi-finals
2	(South Korea) Ulsan HD	81	27	54	16	6	5	Semi-finals	Group stage	Semi-finals
3	(South Korea) Jeonbuk Hyundai Motors	80	30	50	13	11	3	Quarter-finals	Semi-finals	Quarter-finals
4	(Japan) Kawasaki Frontale	64	15	49	15	4	2	Round of 16	Group stage	Round of 16
5	(Saudi Arabia) Al-Nassr	61	21	40	12	4	3	Semi-finals	–	Quarter-finals
6	(Japan) Yokohama F. Marinos	60	21	39	12	3	6	Round of 16	–	Final
7	(South Korea) Pohang Steelers	56	21	35	10	5	3	Final	–	Round of 16
8	(Qatar) Al-Duhail	53	18	35	10	5	6	Group stage	Semi-finals	Group stage
9	(Japan) Urawa Red Diamonds	49	18	31	9	4	4	–	Champion	Group stage
10	(Thailand) BG Pathum United	46	18	28	8	4	9	Round of 16	Quarter-finals	Group stage
11	(United Arab Emirates) Al-Ain	43	15	28	9	1	4	–	–	Champion

=== CAF Champions League ===
Table showing the top ten in the CAF rankings. Two teams qualified through the confederation ranking method.

CAF ranking
Rank	Team	Total points	Competition points	Match points	W	D	L	Performance			
Rank	Team	Total points	Competition points	Match points	W	D	L	2020–21	2021–22	2022–23	2023–24
1	(Egypt) Al Ahly	140	48	92	26	14	6	Champion	Final	Champion	Champion
2	(Morocco) Wydad AC	108	36	72	21	9	9	Semi-finals	Champion	Final	Group stage
3	(Tunisia) Espérance de Tunis	100	36	64	17	13	10	Semi-finals	Quarter-finals	Semi-finals	Final
4	(South Africa) Mamelodi Sundowns	98	30	68	19	11	6	Quarter-finals	Quarter-finals	Semi-finals	Semi-finals
5	(Algeria) CR Belouizdad	63	21	42	11	9	10	Quarter-finals	Quarter-finals	Quarter-finals	Group stage
6	(Angola) Petro de Luanda	58	21	37	9	10	11	Group stage	Semi-finals	Group stage	Quarter-finals
7	(Tanzania) Simba	55	18	37	11	4	9	Quarter-finals	–	Quarter-finals	Quarter-finals
8	(Morocco) Raja CA	45	12	33	10	3	3	–	Quarter-finals	Quarter-finals	–
9	(Sudan) Al Hilal	35	12	23	5	8	11	Group stage	Group stage	Group stage	Group stage
10	(Democratic Republic of the Congo) TP Mazembe	32	12	20	5	5	6	Group stage	–	–	Semi-finals

=== CONCACAF Champions Cup ===
Table showing the top ten in the CONCACAF rankings, as well as other relevant teams.

CONCACAF ranking
Rank	Team	Total points	Competition points	Match points	W	D	L	Performance			
Rank	Team	Total points	Competition points	Match points	W	D	L	2021	2022	2023	2024
1	(Mexico) Monterrey	52	21	31	10	1	2	Champion	–	–	Semi-finals
2	(Mexico) León	47	21	26	8	2	4	Round of 16	Quarter-finals	Champion	–
3	(Mexico) América	44	21	23	7	2	4	Final	–	–	Semi-finals
4	(United States) Philadelphia Union	41	21	20	5	5	4	Semi-finals	–	Semi-finals	Round of 16
5	(Mexico) Cruz Azul	39	18	21	6	3	3	Semi-finals	Semi-finals	–	–
6	(United States) Columbus Crew	37	18	19	5	4	2	Quarter-finals	–	–	Final
7	(Mexico) Pachuca	34	15	19	5	4	0	–	–	Round of 16	Champion
8	(Mexico) UANL	32	15	17	4	5	1	–	–	Semi-finals	Quarter-finals
9	(United States) Seattle Sounders FC	28	12	16	4	4	0	–	Champion	–	–
10	(United States) Los Angeles FC	25	12	13	4	1	3	–	–	Final	–
21	(United States) Inter Miami CF	10	6	4	1	1	2	–	–	–	Quarter-finals

=== Copa Libertadores ===
Table showing the top ten in the CONMEBOL rankings, as well as other relevant teams. Two teams qualified through the confederation ranking method.

CONMEBOL ranking
Rank	Team	Total points	Competition points	Match points	W	D	L	Performance			
Rank	Team	Total points	Competition points	Match points	W	D	L	2021	2022	2023	2024
1	(Brazil) Flamengo	141	45	96	29	9	6	Final	Champion	Round of 16	Quarter-finals
2	(Brazil) Palmeiras	140	45	95	27	14	4	Champion	Semi-finals	Semi-finals	Round of 16
3	(Brazil) Atlético Mineiro	122	42	80	22	14	7	Semi-finals	Quarter-finals	Round of 16	Final
4	(Argentina) River Plate	103	33	70	20	10	8	Quarter-finals	Round of 16	Round of 16	Semi-finals
5	(Brazil) Fluminense	97	33	64	18	10	5	Quarter-finals	–	Champion	Quarter-finals
6	(Argentina) Boca Juniors	71	27	44	10	14	5	Round of 16	Round of 16	Final	–
7	(Brazil) Athletico Paranaense	59	21	38	11	5	5	–	Final	Round of 16	–
8	(Paraguay) Olimpia	57	21	36	10	6	10	Quarter-finals	Group stage	Quarter-finals	–
9	(Uruguay) Nacional	57	18	39	10	9	9	Group stage	Group stage	Round of 16	Round of 16
10	(Brazil) São Paulo	53	18	35	9	8	3	Quarter-finals	–	–	Quarter-finals
22	(Brazil) Botafogo	37	15	22	6	4	3	–	–	–	Champion

=== OFC Champions League ===
For the OFC, only the best-ranked club that was continental champion qualified for the tournament. The confederation ranking was therefore not applicable, as Auckland City won all three OFC Champions League competitions in this qualification timeframe.

=== UEFA Champions League ===
Table showing the top twenty in the UEFA rankings. Nine teams qualified through the confederation ranking method.

UEFA ranking
Rank	Team	Total points	Competition points	Match points	W	D	L	Performance			
Rank	Team	Total points	Competition points	Match points	W	D	L	2020–21	2021–22	2022–23	2023–24
1	(England) Manchester City	123	45	78	34	10	4	Final	Semi-finals	Champion	Quarter-finals
2	(Spain) Real Madrid	119	46	73	32	9	9	Semi-finals	Champion	Semi-finals	Champion
3	(Germany) Bayern Munich	108	41	67	30	7	5	Quarter-finals	Quarter-finals	Quarter-finals	Semi-finals
4	(France) Paris Saint-Germain	85	40	45	19	7	14	Semi-finals	Round of 16	Round of 16	Semi-finals
5	(England) Chelsea	79	32	47	21	5	7	Champion	Quarter-finals	Quarter-finals	–
6	(Germany) Borussia Dortmund	79	35	44	18	8	11	Quarter-finals	Group stage	Round of 16	Final
7	(Italy) Inter Milan	76	34	42	16	10	9	Group stage	Round of 16	Final	Round of 16
8	(England) Liverpool	76	31	45	21	3	7	Quarter-finals	Final	Round of 16	–
9	(Portugal) Porto	68	32	36	16	4	12	Quarter-finals	Group stage	Round of 16	Round of 16
10	(Spain) Atlético Madrid	67	33	34	12	10	12	Round of 16	Quarter-finals	Group stage	Quarter-finals
11	(Germany) RB Leipzig	62	31	31	14	3	13	Round of 16	Group stage	Round of 16	Round of 16
12	(Spain) Barcelona	61	27	34	15	4	11	Round of 16	Group stage	Group stage	Quarter-finals
13	(Portugal) Benfica	52	24	28	10	8	8	–	Quarter-finals	Quarter-finals	Group stage
14	(Italy) Juventus	47	22	25	12	1	9	Round of 16	Round of 16	Group stage	–
15	(Italy) Napoli	42	19	23	10	3	5	–	–	Quarter-finals	Round of 16
16	(Spain) Sevilla	42	21	21	6	9	11	Round of 16	Group stage	Group stage	Group stage
17	(Italy) AC Milan	41	19	22	8	6	10	–	Group stage	Semi-finals	Group stage
18	(Austria) Red Bull Salzburg	40	21	19	6	7	13	Group stage	Round of 16	Group stage	Group stage
19	(Netherlands) Ajax	39	17	22	10	2	8	Group stage	Round of 16	Group stage	–
20	(Italy) Lazio	35	18	17	6	5	5	Round of 16	–	–	Round of 16

== Play-in match ==
León was originally set to participate in the tournament as the winner of the 2023 CONCACAF Champions League. However, the team was removed from the tournament by the FIFA Appeal Committee on March 21, 2025, due to violating the rules on multi-club ownership, as León and Pachuca have the same owner. On May 6, 2025, the Court of Arbitration for Sport rejected appeals by León, Pachuca, and Alajuelense, who originally brought the case to FIFA. León's expulsion was confirmed by FIFA; their spot in the Club World Cup remaining vacant until further notice. In the same press release, FIFA announced that the vacant spot would not be given on merit, and instead ordered Los Angeles FC, the runner-up to León in the 2023 CONCACAF Champions League, and Club América, the top-ranked team in the CONCACAF confederation ranking at the conclusion of the 2024 CONCACAF Champions Cup to compete against each other in a one-off match. FIFA also confirmed that the final spot would be awarded to the winner of the play-in, with further details coming at a later date. On May 16, 2025, FIFA officially announced the match would be held on May 31, hosted by Los Angeles FC at BMO Stadium in Los Angeles.

May 31, 2025
7:30 pm PDT

Los Angeles FC (United States)	2–1 (a.e.t.)	(Mexico) América
Igor Jesus 89'; Bouanga 115'	Report	Rodríguez 64' (pen.)

BMO Stadium, Los Angeles
Attendance: 20,714
Referee: Wilton Sampaio (Brazil)

Los Angeles FC	América

GK	1	(France) Hugo Lloris
RB	14	(Spain) Sergi Palencia	(yellow card) 66'
CB	33	(United States) Aaron Long (c)		(substituted off) 106'
CB	4	(Colombia) Eddie Segura
LB	24	(United States) Ryan Hollingshead
CM	8	(United States) Mark Delgado	(yellow card) 62'	(substituted off) 74'
CM	6	(Brazil) Igor Jesus	(yellow card) 59'
CM	11	(United States) Timothy Tillman	(yellow card) 110'
RF	27	(El Salvador) Nathan Ordaz		(substituted off) 68'
CF	17	(United States) Jeremy Ebobisse		(substituted off) 74'
LF	99	(Gabon) Denis Bouanga
Substitutions:
FW	30	(Venezuela) David Martínez		(substituted on) 68'
FW	9	(France) Olivier Giroud		(substituted on) 74'
FW	22	(Turkey) Cengiz Ünder		(substituted on) 74' (substituted off) 90+4'
FW	23	(United States) Frankie Amaya	(yellow card) 104'	(substituted on) 90+4'
DF	5	(Brazil) Marlon		(substituted on) 106'
MF	20	(Ghana) Yaw Yeboah		(substituted on) 120'
DF	21	(Canada) Ryan Raposo		(substituted on) 120'
Manager:
(United States) Steve Cherundolo

GK	1	(Mexico) Luis Malagón
RB	3	(Mexico) Israel Reyes	(yellow card) 119'
CB	4	(Uruguay) Sebastián Cáceres	(yellow card) 18'	(substituted off) 85'
CB	5	(Mexico) Kevin Álvarez		(substituted off) 91'
LB	26	(Colombia) Cristian Borja		(substituted off) 91'
CM	28	(Mexico) Érick Sánchez
CM	13	(Mexico) Alan Cervantes		(substituted off) 46'
RW	17	(United States) Alejandro Zendejas	(yellow card) 89'	(substituted off) 89'
AM	8	(Spain) Álvaro Fidalgo (c)
LW	11	(Chile) Víctor Dávila		(substituted off) 46'
CF	27	(Uruguay) Rodrigo Aguirre		(substituted off) 89'
Substitutions:
MF	6	(Mexico) Jonathan dos Santos		(substituted on) 46'
MF	7	(Uruguay) Brian Rodríguez		(substituted on) 46'
DF	29	(Mexico) Ramón Juárez		(substituted on) 85'
DF	32	(Mexico) Miguel Vázquez		(substituted on) 89'
DF	18	(Mexico) Cristian Calderón		(substituted on) 89'
MF	10	(Chile) Diego Valdés		(substituted on) 91'
MF	24	(Netherlands) Javairô Dilrosun		(substituted on) 91'
Manager:
(Brazil) André Jardine

Man of the Match:
Denis Bouanga (Los Angeles FC)

Assistant referees:
Bruno Pires (Brazil)
Bruno Boschilia (Brazil)
Fourth official:
Ramon Abatti (Brazil)
