= José Iván Rodríguez =

Mexican footballer (born 1996)

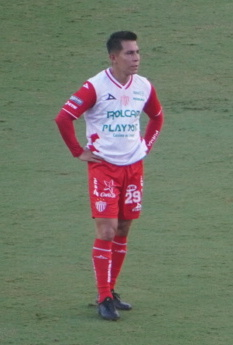
- Rodríguez with Necaxa in 2025

Personal information
- Full name: José Iván Rodríguez Rebollar
- Date of birth: 17 June 1996 (age 30)
- Place of birth: Morelia, Michoacán, Mexico
- Height: 1.70 m (5 ft 7 in)
- Position: Defensive midfielder

Team information
- Current team: León
- Number: 29

Youth career
- 2013–2015: León
- 2015: Real Leonés
- 2015–2016: Ocelotes UNACH
- 2016–2017: León

Senior career*
Years	Team	Apps	(Gls)
2017–	León	224	(0)
2024	→ América (loan)	0	(0)
2025	→ Necaxa (loan)	32	(1)

International career^{‡}
2019	Mexico	2	(0)
- * Club domestic league appearances and goals as of 8 November 2026 ‡ National team caps and goals as of 18 November 2020

José Iván Rodríguez Rebollar (born 17 June 1996), also known as Jefecito, is a Mexican professional footballer who plays as a defensive midfielder for Liga MX club León.

== International career ==
Rodríguez was included in Gerardo Martino's preliminary roster for the 2019 CONCACAF Gold Cup but did not make the final list due to an ankle injury. He made his senior national team debut on 2 October 2019 in a friendly against Trinidad & Tobago. He started the game and played the whole match.

== Career statistics ==
=== Club ===
As of match played on 8 November 2026

Club	Season	League			Cup		Continental		Other		Total	
Club	Season	Division	Apps	Goals	Apps	Goals	Apps	Goals	Apps	Goals	Apps	Goals
León	2016–17	Liga MX	1	0	3	0	—		—		4	0
León	2017–18	Liga MX	30	0	6	0	—		—		36	0
León	2018–19	Liga MX	33	0	7	0	—		—		40	0
León	2019–20	Liga MX	13	0	—		2 (Note: Appearances in CONCACAF Champions League)	0	—		15	0
León	2020–21	Liga MX	26	0	1 (Note: Appearance in Campeón de Campeones)	0	—		3 (Note: Appearances in Leagues Cup)	0	30	0
León	2021–22	Liga MX	37	0	—		1	0	—		38	0
León	2022–23	Liga MX	25	0	—		—		—		25	0
León	2023–24	Liga MX	29	0	—		—		3	0	32	0
León	2025–26	Liga MX	16	0	—		—		—		16	0
León	2026–27	Liga MX	14	0	—		—		6	0	20	0
León	Total		224	0	17	0	3	0	12	0	256	0
América (loan)	2024–25	Liga MX	—		1	0	—		—		1	0
Necaxa (loan)	2024–25	Liga MX	17	1	—		—		—		17	1
Necaxa (loan)	2025–26	Liga MX	15	0	—		—		3	0	18	0
Necaxa (loan)	Total		32	1	—		—		3	0	35	1
Career total			256	1	18	0	3	0	15	0	292	1

=== International ===
As of match played on 12 October 2019

National team	Year	Apps	Goals
Mexico	2019	2	0
Total		2	0

== Honours ==
León

- Liga MX: Guardianes 2020
- Leagues Cup: 2021
- CONCACAF Champions League: 2023

América

- Liga MX: Apertura 2024
- Supercopa de la Liga MX: 2024
- Campeones Cup: 2024
