= Illian Hernández =

Mexican-Malaysian footballer (born 2000)

Personal information
- Full name: Illian Gerardo Hernández Vargas
- Date of birth: 12 April 2000 (age 26)
- Place of birth: Fresnillo, Zacatecas, Mexico
- Height: 1.81 m (5 ft 11 in)
- Position: Forward

Team information
- Current team: Pachuca
- Number: 19

Youth career
- 2016–2017: Fresnillo
- 2020–2021: Pachuca

Senior career*
| Years | Team | Apps | (Gls) |
| 2017–2018 | Fresnillo | 51 | (40) |
| 2019–2020 | Zacatecas | 0 | (0) |
| 2019–2020 | → Zacatecas Premier (loan) | 23 | (22) |
| 2021– | Pachuca | 53 | (7) |
| 2024 | → América (loan) | 18 | (1) |
| 2026 | → Atlante (loan) | 6 | (0) |
- * Club domestic league appearances and goals as of 18 October 2026

Illian Gerardo Hernández Vargas (born 12 April 2000) is a professional footballer who plays as a forward for Liga MX club Pachuca.

== Club career ==
=== Mineros de Fresnillo ===
He started his career playing for Mineros de Fresnillo in the Liga Premier de México, as a forward, scoring 15 goals in his first season.

=== Mineros de Zacatecas ===
In the Liga de Expansión MX, he scored 32 goals and became the top goal scorer, which made Mineros de Zacatecas to sign him for their reserves team. He made his debut in Copa MX on 4 September 2019, against Tijuana, coming in as a late substitute. In the 2019–2020 season, he was the top goal scorer with a 10-goal advantage over his closest opponent, but due to the COVID-19 pandemic, the tournament was cancelled and there was no top goal scorer award.

=== Pachuca ===
In June 2020, he was signed by first division team Pachuca. He signed a permanent deal for 3 years.

He made his debut on 23 September 2021, coming in as a substitute for Nicolás Ibáñez in a 1–0 victory over Necaxa.

On 28 August 2022 he scored his first and second Liga MX goals, after scoring his first two goals in which Pachuca defeated Toluca with a 4–1 score. Hernandez became the Liga MX champions during that season.

==== Loan to América ====
On 10 January 2024, Hernández joined América on a one-year loan.

== Career statistics ==
=== Club ===
As of match played on 18 October 2026

| Club | Season | League | | | Cup | | Continental | | Global | | Other | | Total | |
| Club | Season | Division | Apps | Goals | Apps | Goals | Apps | Goals | Apps | Goals | Apps | Goals | Apps | Goals |
|---|---|---|---|---|---|---|---|---|---|---|---|---|---|---|
| Fresnillo | 2017–18 | Serie B | 51 | 40 | — | | — | | — | | — | | 51 | 40 |
| Zacatecas | 2019–20 | Ascenso MX | — | | 2 | 0 | — | | — | | — | | 2 | 0 |
| Pachuca | 2021–22 | Liga MX | 5 | 0 | — | | — | | — | | — | | 5 | 0 |
| Pachuca | 2022–23 | Liga MX | 26 | 4 | 1 (Note: Appearance in Campeón de Campeones) | 0 | 2 (Note: Appearances in CONCACAF Champions Cup) | 1 | — | | — | | 29 | 5 |
| Pachuca | 2023–24 | Liga MX | 14 | 2 | — | | — | | — | | 1 (Note: Appearances in Leagues Cup) | 0 | 15 | 2 |
| Pachuca | 2024–25 | Liga MX | 4 | 1 | — | | — | | — | | — | | 4 | 1 |
| Pachuca | 2025–26 | Liga MX | 12 | 0 | — | | — | | 1 (Note: Appearance in FIFA Club World Cup) | 0 | 2 | 0 | 15 | 0 |
| Pachuca | 2026–27 | Liga MX | 1 | 0 | — | | — | | — | | 1 | 0 | 2 | 0 |
| Pachuca | Total | | 62 | 7 | 1 | 0 | 2 | 1 | 1 | 0 | 4 | 0 | 70 | 8 |
| América (loan) | 2023–24 | Liga MX | 10 | 0 | — | | 1 | 0 | — | | — | | 11 | 0 |
| América (loan) | 2024–25 | Liga MX | 8 | 1 | — | | — | | — | | 1 | 0 | 9 | 1 |
| América (loan) | Total | | 18 | 1 | — | | 1 | 0 | — | | 1 | 0 | 20 | 1 |
| Atlante (loan) | 2025–26 | Liga MX | 6 | 0 | — | | — | | — | | — | | 6 | 0 |
| Career total | | | 137 | 48 | 3 | 0 | 3 | 1 | 1 | 0 | 5 | 0 | 149 | 49 |

== Honours ==
Pachuca

- Liga MX: Apertura 2022

América

- Liga MX: Clausura 2024, Apertura 2024
- Campeón de Campeones: 2024
- Campeones Cup: 2024
