= Dagoberto Espinoza =

Mexican footballer (born 2004)

Personal information
- Full name: Dagoberto Espinoza Acosta
- Date of birth: 17 April 2004 (age 22)
- Place of birth: Guamúchil, Sinaloa, Mexico
- Height: 1.80 m (5 ft 11 in)
- Positions: Midfielder; right-back

Team information
- Current team: América
- Number: 34

Youth career
- 2022–2024: América

Senior career*
Years	Team	Apps	(Gls)
2024–	América	42	(1)
2022–2023	→ Jong Cercle (loan)	29	(2)

International career^{‡}
2021	Mexico U20	2	(0)
2023	Mexico U23	1	(0)
2026–	Mexico	1	(0)
Medal record
Men's football
Representing Mexico
Toulon Tournament
Second place	2023 France	Team
- * Club domestic league appearances and goals as of 7 November 2026 ‡ National team caps and goals as of 6 October 2026

Dagoberto Espinoza Acosta (born 17 April 2004) is a Mexican professional footballer who plays as a midfielder and a right-back for Liga MX club América and the Mexico national team.

== Club career ==
Born in Guamúchil, Sinaloa, his parents are from Emiliano Zapata, Michoacan, Mexico. Espinoza joined the youth academy of América and then had a brief spell with Jong Cercle, the youth academy of Belgian football Cercle Brugge during the 2022–23 season. Upon his return to América, Espinoza made his professional debut coming in as a late substitute in the CONCACAF Champions Cup match against New England Revolution on 9 April 2024.

Espinoza made his league debut in the Apertura 2024 season being one of the youngsters for the squad that had more minutes during the season. Espinoza appeared 9 times during the season for América, season that saw the team win the championship.

== International career ==
In June 2023, Espinoza took part in the Maurice Revello Tournament in France with Mexico.

On 6 October 2026, Espinoza made his debut for the Mexico national team in a friendly against Chile.

== Career statistics ==
As of match played on 7 November 2026

Club	Season	League			Cup		Continental (Note: Appearance(s) in CONCACAF Champions League / Cup)		Other		Total	
Club	Season	Division	Apps	Goals	Apps	Goals	Apps	Goals	Apps	Goals	Apps	Goals
América	2023–24	Liga MX	—		—		1	0	—		1	0
América	2024–25	Liga MX	20	0	—		—		3 (Note: One appearance in Leagues Cup, one appearance in Supercopa de la Liga MX, one appearance in Campeones Cup)	0	23	0
América	2025–26	Liga MX	8	1	—		—		1 (Note: Appearance in Leagues Cup)	0	9	1
América	2026–27	Liga MX	14	0	—		—		4	0	18	0
Career total			42	1	0	0	1	0	8	0	51	1

=== International ===
As of match played on 6 October 2026

Appearances and goals by national team and year
National team	Year	Apps	Goals
Mexico	2026	1	0
Total		1	0

== Honours ==
América

- Liga MX: Apertura 2024
- Supercopa de la Liga MX: 2024
- Campeones Cup: 2024
