= Jonathan Estrada =

Jonathan Estrada may refer to:

- Jonathan Estrada (footballer, born 1983), Colombian football midfielder
- Jonathan Estrada (footballer, born 1998), Mexican football goalkeeper

== See also ==
- John Estrada (born 1973), Filipino film and TV actor
- John L. Estrada (born 1955), U.S. Ambassador to Trinidad and Tobago and 15th Sergeant Major of the U.S. Marine Corps
