= Érick Sánchez =

Mexican footballer (born 1999)

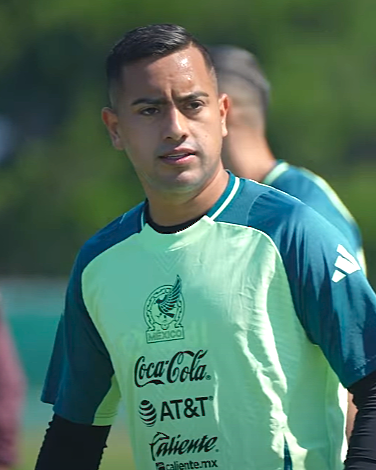
- Sánchez with Mexico in 2025

Personal information
- Full name: Érick Daniel Sánchez Ocegueda
- Date of birth: 27 September 1999 (age 27)
- Place of birth: Mexico City, Mexico
- Height: 1.60 m (5 ft 3 in)
- Position: Midfielder

Team information
- Current team: América
- Number: 28

Youth career
- 2014–2018: Pachuca

Senior career*
Years	Team	Apps	(Gls)
2016–2024	Pachuca	163	(20)
2018–2020	→ Zacatecas (loan)	19	(2)
2024–	América	85	(7)

International career^{‡}
2021	Mexico U23	2	(0)
2021–	Mexico	38	(3)
Medal record
Men's football
Representing Mexico
CONCACAF Gold Cup
Winner	2023 United States–Canada	Team
Runner-up	2021 United States	Team
CONCACAF Nations League
Runner-up	2024 United States
Third place	2023 United States
- * Club domestic league appearances and goals as of 7 November 2026 ‡ National team caps and goals as of 31 March 2026

Érick Daniel Sánchez Ocegueda (born 27 September 1999), commonly known as "Chiquito", is a Mexican professional footballer who plays as a midfielder for Liga MX club América and the Mexico national team.

== Club career ==
=== Pachuca ===
Sánchez debuted in the top level Mexican League Liga BBVA Bancomer against Toluca on 7 August 2016 when he was only 16 years old. Sánchez has played in all of Pachuca's youth divisions such as Under-15, Under-17, Under-20, Second Division and has made appearance in the First Division team. Through his young career he has played in eight finals, two with the U-15 and six with the U-17 team.

=== América ===
On 28 June 2024, Sánchez joined América.

== International career ==
Sánchez was called up by Gerardo Martino to participate with the senior national team at the 2021 CONCACAF Gold Cup and made his debut on 14 July 2021 in a game against Guatemala.

In October 2022, Sánchez was named in Mexico's preliminary 31-man squad for the World Cup, but did not make the final 26.

On 11 June 2022, Sánchez scored his first international goal during a match against Suriname in 2022–23 CONCACAF Nations League League A.

== Career statistics ==
=== Club ===
As of match played on 7 November 2026

Appearances and goals by club, season and competition
Club	Season	League			Cup		Continental		Intercontinental		Other		Total	
Club	Season	Division	Apps	Goals	Apps	Goals	Apps	Goals	Apps	Goals	Apps	Goals		
Pachuca	2016–17	Liga MX	1	0	—		—		—		—		1	0
Pachuca	2017–18	Liga MX	13	0	10	1	—		3 (Note: Appearances in FIFA Club World Cup)	0	—		26	1
Pachuca	2018–19	Liga MX	—		2	0	—		—		—		2	0
Pachuca	2020–21	Liga MX	41	4	—		—		—		—		41	4
Pachuca	2021–22	Liga MX	36	3	—		—		—		—		36	3
Pachuca	2022–23	Liga MX	40	4	—		2 (Note: Appearances in CONCACAF Champions Cup)	0	—		—		42	4
Pachuca	2023–24	Liga MX	32	9	—		6	0	—		1 (Note: Appearance in Leagues Cup)	0	39	9
Pachuca	Total		163	20	12	1	8	0	3	0	1	0	187	21
Zacatecas (loan)	2018–19	Ascenso MX	8	1	5	0	—		—		—		13	1
Zacatecas (loan)	2019–20	Ascenso MX	11	1	4	0	—		—		—		15	1
Zacatecas (loan)	Total		19	2	9	0	—		—		—		28	2
América	2024–25	Liga MX	39	2	—		4	0	—		3	1	46	3
América	2025–26	Liga MX	30	3	1 (Note: Appearance in the 2025 Campeón de Campeones)	0	6	0	1	0	3	1	41	4
América	2026–27	Liga MX	16	2	—		—		—		6	1	22	3
América	Total		85	7	1	0	10	0	1	0	12	3	109	10
Career total			267	29	22	1	18	0	4	0	13	3	324	33

=== International ===
As of match played on 31 March 2026

Appearances and goals by national team and year
National team	Year	Apps	Goals
Mexico	2021	2	0
Mexico	2022	6	1
Mexico	2023	17	2
Mexico	2024	4	0
Mexico	2025	6	0
Mexico	2026	3	0
Total		38	3

Scores and results list Mexico's goal tally first.

List of international goals scored by Érick Sánchez
No.	Date	Venue	Opponent	Score	Result	Competition
1.	11 June 2022	Estadio Corona, Torreón, Mexico	Suriname	3–0	3–0	2022–23 CONCACAF Nations League A
2.	8 July 2023	AT&T Stadium, Arlington, United States	Costa Rica	2–0	2–0	2023 CONCACAF Gold Cup
3.	17 October 2023	Lincoln Financial Field, Philadelphia, United States	Germany	2–1	2–2	Friendly

== Honours ==
Pachuca

- Liga MX: Apertura 2022
- CONCACAF Champions Cup: 2024

América

- Liga MX: Apertura 2024
- Campeones Cup: 2024

Mexico

- CONCACAF Gold Cup: 2023
