= Víctor Dávila =

Chilean footballer (born 1997)

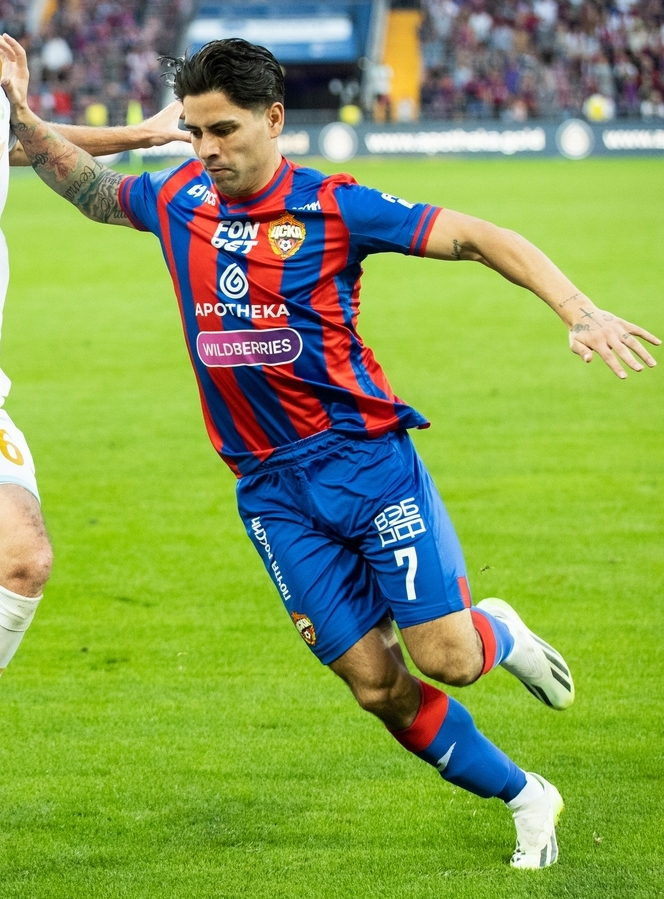
- Dávila with CSKA Moscow in 2023

Personal information
- Full name: Víctor Alejandro Dávila Zavala
- Date of birth: 4 November 1997 (age 29)
- Place of birth: Iquique, Chile
- Height: 1.72 m (5 ft 7 1/2 in)
- Position: Forward

Team information
- Current team: América
- Number: 11

Youth career
- Huachipato

Senior career*
Years	Team	Apps	(Gls)
2014–2017	Huachipato	26	(1)
2017–2018	Necaxa	32	(10)
2019–2020	Pachuca	47	(7)
2021–2023	León	89	(29)
2023–2024	CSKA Moscow	27	(5)
2024–	América	33	(9)

International career^{‡}
2015–2017	Chile U20	4	(0)
2018–	Chile	19	(3)
- * Club domestic league appearances and goals as of 24 August 2025 ‡ National team caps and goals as of 10 June 2025

Víctor Alejandro Dávila Zavala (born 4 November 1997) is a Chilean professional footballer who plays as a forward for Liga MX club América and the Chile national team.

== Club career ==
=== Huachipato ===
Dávila made his professional debut with Huachipato on July 16, 2014, in a Copa Chile match against Lota Schwager, which ended in a goalless draw.

He made his Primera División debut on November 21, 2014, in a home fixture against Unión Española that concluded in a 1–3 defeat. He scored his first goal on October 1, 2016, during a 1–2 away defeat against Universidad Católica.

=== México ===
On May 17, 2017, Dávila transferred to Necaxa in Mexico. He made his official debut on August 1, in a Copa México match against Mineros de Zacatecas.

On December 18, 2018, Pachuca announced his signing.

On December 18, 2020, Dávila joined León. In June 2023, he was part of the squad that claimed the CONCACAF Champions League title, and was recognized as the tournament's best player.

=== CSKA Moscow ===
In August 2023, Dávila signed with Russian club CSKA Moscow.

=== Club América ===
On September 15, 2024, Dávila returned to Mexico to join Club América. Two days later, he made his debut for the club, in a 3–0 victory over Atlas.

== International career ==
Along with Chile U20, he won the L'Alcúdia Tournament in 2015.

== Other works ==
Víctor is the owner and president of beach soccer club Dávila FC from Iquique that won the 2025 Liga Nacional de Fútbol Playa (Chile) and qualified to the 2025 Copa Libertadores de Fútbol Playa to be played in May 2026.

== Career statistics ==
=== Club ===
As of match played on 24 August 2025

Appearances and goals by club, season and competition
Club	Season	League			National cup		Continental		Other		Total	
Club	Season	Division	Apps	Goals	Apps	Goals	Apps	Goals	Apps	Goals	Apps	Goals
Huachipato	2014–15	Chilean Primera División	1	0	3	0	0	0	0	0	4	0
Huachipato	2015–16	Chilean Primera División	9	0	8	2	0	0	0	0	17	2
Huachipato	2016–17	Chilean Primera División	16	1	4	0	0	0	0	0	20	1
Huachipato	Total		26	1	15	2	0	0	0	0	41	3
Necaxa	2017–18	Liga MX	16	4	9	2	0	0	0	0	25	6
Necaxa	2018–19	Liga MX	16	6	0	0	0	0	1 (Note: Appearance in Supercopa MX)	0	17	6
Necaxa	Total		32	10	9	2	0	0	1	0	41	12
Pachuca	2018–19	Liga MX	9	1	4	0	0	0	0	0	13	1
Pachuca	2019–20	Liga MX	20	1	5	2	0	0	0	0	25	3
Pachuca	2020–21	Liga MX	18	5	0	0	0	0	0	0	18	5
Pachuca	Total		47	7	9	2	0	0	0	0	56	9
León	2020–21	Liga MX	16	7	0	0	2 (Note: Appearance(s) in CONCACAF Champions Cup)	0	0	0	18	7
León	2021–22	Liga MX	38	12	0	0	4	0	3 (Note: Appearance(s) in Leagues Cup)	1	45	13
León	2022–23	Liga MX	32	10	0	0	7	3	0	0	39	13
León	2023–24	Liga MX	3	0	0	0	0	0	1	0	4	0
León	Total		89	29	0	0	13	0	4	0	106	33
CSKA Moscow	2023–24	Russian Premier League	23	5	9	1	—		—		32	6
CSKA Moscow	2024–25	Russian Premier League	4	0	2	0	—		—		6	0
CSKA Moscow	Total		27	5	11	1	—		—		38	6
América	2024–25	Liga MX	29	8	—		3	0	2 (Note: One appearance in FIFA Club World Cup play-in, one appearance and one goal in Campeones Cup)	1	34	9
América	2025–26	Liga MX	4	1	—		0	0	2 (Note: Appearances in Leagues Cup)	0	6	1
América	Total		33	9	—		3	0	4	1	40	10
Career total			255	61	44	7	16	3	9	2	324	73

=== International ===
As of match played 10 June 2025.

Appearances and goals by national team and year
National team	Year	Apps	Goals
Chile	2018	1	0
Chile	2019	0	0
Chile	2020	1	0
Chile	2021	0	0
Chile	2022	0	0
Chile	2023	5	0
Chile	2024	10	3
Chile	2025	2	0
Total		19	3

Chile score listed first, score column indicates score after each Dávila goal.

No.	Date	Venue	Opponent	Score	Result	Competition
1	22 March 2024	Stadio Ennio Tardini, Parma, Italy	Albania	3–0	3–0	Friendly
2	11 June 2024	Estadio Nacional Julio Martínez Prádanos, Ñuñoa, Chile	Paraguay	1–0	3–0	Friendly
3	11 June 2024	Estadio Nacional Julio Martínez Prádanos, Ñuñoa, Chile	Paraguay	3–0	3–0	Friendly

== Honours ==
Necaxa

- Copa MX: Clausura 2018
- Supercopa MX: 2018

León

- CONCACAF Champions League: 2023
- Leagues Cup: 2021

América

- Liga MX: Apertura 2024
- Campeones Cup: 2024

CSKA Moscow

- Russian Cup: 2024–25

Chile U20

- L'Alcúdia International Tournament: 2015

Individual

- CONCACAF Champions League Golden Ball: 2023
- CONCACAF Champions League Best XI: 2023
- Russian Premier League goal of the month: November/December 2023 (for PFC CSKA Moscow against FC Fakel Voronezh on 11 November 2023).
