= Ramón Juárez =

Mexican footballer (born 2001)

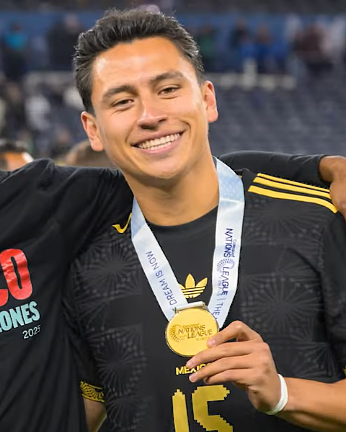
- Juárez with Mexico in 2025

Personal information
- Full name: Ramón Juárez Del Castillo
- Date of birth: 9 May 2001 (age 25)
- Place of birth: Rioverde, San Luis Potosí, Mexico
- Height: 1.80 m (5 ft 11 in)
- Position: Centre-back

Team information
- Current team: América
- Number: 29

Senior career*
| Years | Team | Apps | (Gls) |
| 2019– | América | 116 | (4) |
| 2021 | → Puebla (loan) | 1 | (0) |
| 2022 | → Atlético San Luis (loan) | 25 | (1) |

International career^{‡}
| 2021–2022 | Mexico U21 | 7 | (2) |
| 2023–2024 | Mexico U23 | 8 | (1) |
| 2025– | Mexico | 2 | (0) |
Medal record
Men's football
Representing Mexico
CONCACAF Nations League
| Winner | 2025 United States |
Toulon Tournament
| Third place | 2022 France | Team |
| Second place | 2023 France | Team |
- * Club domestic league appearances and goals as of 28 October 2026 ‡ National team caps and goals as of 25 January 2026

Ramón Juárez Del Castillo (born 9 May 2001) is a Mexican professional footballer who plays as a centre-back for Liga MX club América and the Mexico national team.

== Club career ==
=== América ===
Juárez made his professional debut for Liga MX club América on 27 August 2019 in the Apertura 2019 against Pachuca. He came on as a substitute.

== International career ==
=== Youth ===
Juárez participated at the 2022 Maurice Revello Tournament, scoring one goal in all five matches, attaining third place at the tournament.

=== Senior ===
Juárez received his first call-up to the senior national team in October 2023, for two friendly matches against Ghana on 14 October, and Germany on 17 October 2023.

On 7 June 2025, Juárez made his senior debut for Mexico, coming on as a substitute for Orbelín Pineda in the 59th minute in a 4–2 defeat to Switzerland.

== Career statistics ==
=== Club ===
As of match played on 28 October 2026

| Club | Season | League | | | Cup | | Continental | | Other | | Total | |
| Club | Season | Division | Apps | Goals | Apps | Goals | Apps | Goals | Apps | Goals | Apps | Goals |
|---|---|---|---|---|---|---|---|---|---|---|---|---|
| América | 2019–20 | Liga MX | 4 | 0 | — | | 2 (Note: Appearances in CONCACAF Champions Cup) | 0 | — | | 6 | 0 |
| América | 2020–21 | Liga MX | 10 | 0 | — | | — | | 3 (Note: Appearances in Copa GNP por México) | 0 | 13 | 0 |
| América | 2023–24 | Liga MX | 30 | 0 | — | | 5 | 0 | — | | 35 | 0 |
| América | 2024–25 | Liga MX | 36 | 2 | — | | 4 | 0 | 4 (Note: One appearance in FIFA Club World Cup play-in, one appearance in Leagues Cup, one appearance in Supercopa de la Liga MX, one appearance in Campeones Cup) | 0 | 44 | 2 |
| América | 2025–26 | Liga MX | 28 | 2 | — | | 4 | 1 | 2 (Note: One appearance and one goal in Leagues Cup, one appearance in Campeón de Campeones) | 1 | 34 | 3 |
| América | 2026–27 | Liga MX | 8 | 0 | — | | — | | 3 (Note: Appearance in Leagues Cup) | 1 | 11 | 1 |
| América | Total | | 116 | 4 | — | | 15 | 1 | 12 | 2 | 143 | 7 |
| Puebla (loan) | 2021–22 | Liga MX | 1 | 0 | — | | — | | — | | 1 | 0 |
| Atlético San Luis (loan) | 2021–22 | Liga MX | 15 | 1 | — | | — | | — | | 15 | 1 |
| Atlético San Luis (loan) | 2022–23 | Liga MX | 10 | 0 | — | | — | | — | | 10 | 0 |
| Atlético San Luis (loan) | Total | | 25 | 1 | — | | — | | — | | 25 | 1 |
| Career total | | | 142 | 5 | 0 | 0 | 15 | 1 | 12 | 2 | 169 | 8 |

=== International ===
As of match played on 25 January 2026

Appearances and goals by national team and year
| National team | Year | Apps | Goals |
|---|---|---|---|
| Mexico | 2025 | 1 | 0 |
| Mexico | 2026 | 1 | 0 |
| Total | | 2 | 0 |

== Honours ==
América

- Liga MX: Apertura 2023, Clausura 2024, Apertura 2024
- Campeón de Campeones: 2024
- Supercopa de la Liga MX: 2024
- Campeones Cup: 2024

Mexico

- CONCACAF Nations League: 2024–25

Individual

- Maurice Revello Tournament Best Player: 2023 (third place)
- Maurice Revello Tournament Best XI: 2023
- Liga MX Best XI: Apertura 2024
- Liga MX Player of the Month: December 2024
