= Esteban Lozano =

Mexican footballer (born 2003)

Personal information
- Full name: Esteban Lozano Solana
- Date of birth: 10 March 2003 (age 23)
- Place of birth: Puebla, Mexico
- Height: 6 ft 0 in (1.84 m)
- Position: Forward

Team information
- Current team: Santos Laguna (on loan from América)
- Number: 20

Youth career
- 2015–2020: América

Senior career*
Years	Team	Apps	(Gls)
2020–	América	5	(1)
2023–2025	→ Sporting Atlético (loan)	19	(8)
2023–2024	→ Sporting Gijón (loan)	8	(0)
2025–2026	→ Puebla (loan)	28	(3)
2026–	→ Santos Laguna (loan)	10	(3)

International career^{‡}
2022	Mexico U20	8	(5)
- * Club domestic league appearances and goals as of 21 November 2026 ‡ National team caps and goals as of 27 September 2022

Esteban Lozano Solana (born 10 March 2003) is a Mexican professional footballer who plays as a forward for Liga MX club Santos Laguna, on loan from América.

== Club career ==
Lozano came through América’s youth academy and made his professional debut on December 16, 2020, in a CONCACAF Champions League match against Atlanta United.

In July 2023, he joined Sporting Atlético on loan. In his first season with the club, he made 19 appearances and scored eight goals. He also featured for the first team, Sporting Gijón, earning minutes in Spain's Segunda División and the Copa del Rey.

Ahead of the Apertura 2025, Lozano joined Puebla on a one-year loan. During that campaign, he played 29 matches and scored three goals.

In August 2026, he joined Santos Laguna on loan.

== International career ==
Lozano was included in the under-20 roster that participated in the 2022 CONCACAF U-20 Championship, in which Mexico failed to qualify for the FIFA U-20 World Cup and Olympics.

== Career statistics ==
=== Club ===
As of match played on 21 November 2026

Club	Season	League			Cup		Continental		Other		Total	
Club	Season	Division	Apps	Goals	Apps	Goals	Apps	Goals	Apps	Goals	Apps	Goals
América	2019–20	Liga MX	—		—		1 (Note: Appearance in CONCACAF Champions League)	0	—		1	0
América	2020–21	Liga MX	—		—		—		2 (Note: Appearances in Copa GNP por México)	0	2	0
América	2022–23	Liga MX	1	0	—		—		—		1	0
América	2024–25	Liga MX	4	1	—		1	0	—		5	1
América	Total		5	1	—		2	0	2	0	9	1
Sporting Atlético (loan)	2023–24	Tercera Federación – Group 2	19	8	—		—		—		19	8
Sporting Gijón (loan)	2023–24	Segunda División	8	0	1	0	—		—		9	0
Puebla (loan)	2025–26	Liga MX	28	3	—		—		4 (Note: Appearances in Leagues Cup)	1	32	4
Santos Laguna (loan)	2026–27	Liga MX	10	3	—		—		—		10	3
Career total			70	15	1	0	2	0	6	1	79	16

== Honours ==
América

- Supercopa de la Liga MX: 2024

Mexico U20

- Revelations Cup: 2022

Individual

- CONCACAF U-20 Championship Best XI: 2022
- IFFHS CONCACAF Youth (U20) Best XI: 2022
