= Álvaro Fidalgo =

Mexican footballer (born 1997)

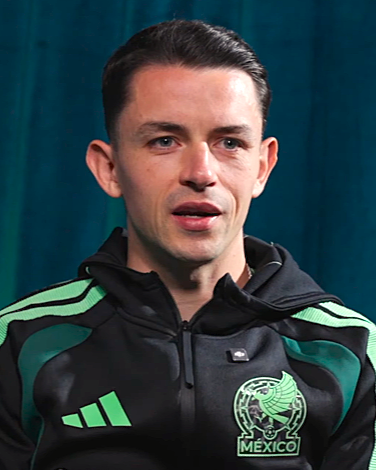
- Fidalgo with Mexico in 2026

Personal information
- Full name: Álvaro Fidalgo Fernández
- Date of birth: 9 April 1997 (age 29)
- Place of birth: Hevia, Siero, Asturias, Spain
- Height: 1.74 m (5 ft 9 in)
- Position: Midfielder

Team information
- Current team: Betis
- Number: 15

Youth career
- 2003–2005: Condal
- 2005–2010: Oviedo
- 2010–2012: Sporting Gijón
- 2012–2016: Real Madrid

Senior career*
| Years | Team | Apps | (Gls) |
| 2016–2020 | Real Madrid B | 89 | (15) |
| 2016–2017 | → Rayo Majadahonda (loan) | 31 | (0) |
| 2018 | Real Madrid | 0 | (0) |
| 2020–2021 | Castellón | 22 | (0) |
| 2021 | → América (loan) | 12 | (0) |
| 2021–2026 | América | 183 | (20) |
| 2026– | Betis | 13 | (1) |

International career^{‡}
| 2013 | Spain U16 | 2 | (0) |
| 2013 | Spain U17 | 1 | (0) |
| 2026– | Mexico | 12 | (1) |
- * Club domestic league appearances and goals as of 17 November 2026 ‡ National team caps and goals as of 29 September 2026

Álvaro Fidalgo Fernández (born 9 April 1997), nicknamed “Maguito” (lit. 'Little Magician'), is a professional footballer who plays as a midfielder for La Liga club Real Betis. Born in Spain, he represents the Mexico national team.

== Club career ==
=== Real Madrid ===
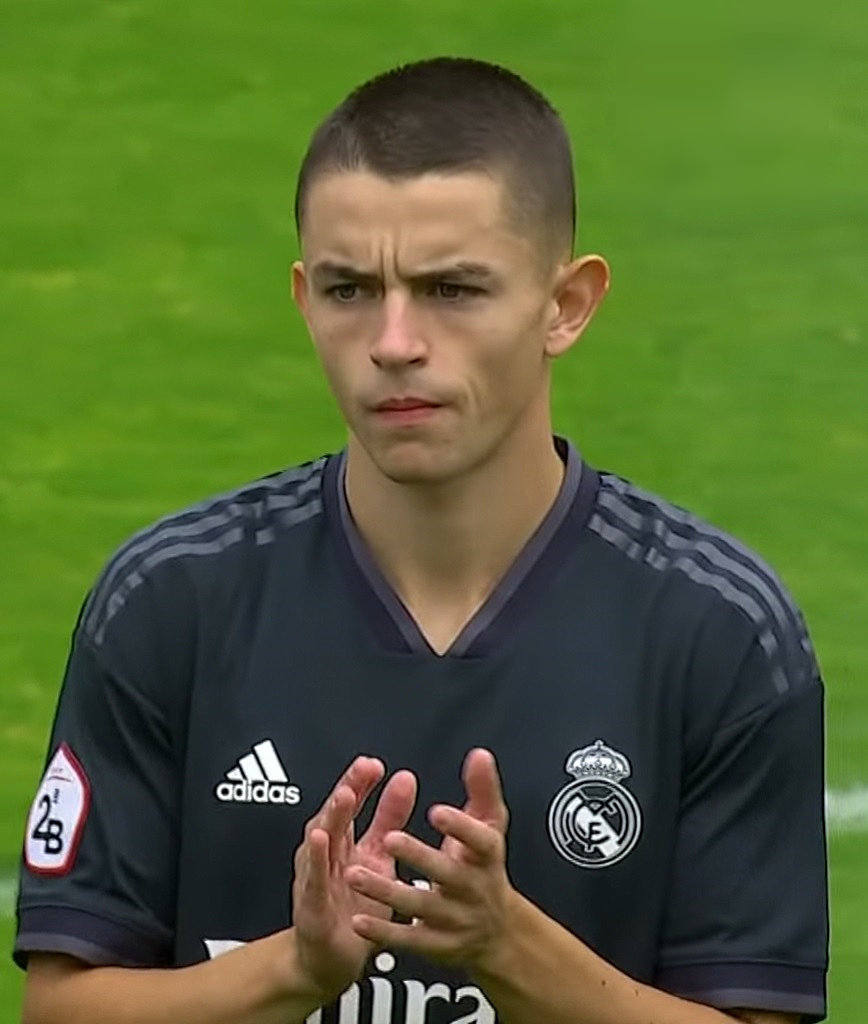
Fidalgo with Real Madrid Castilla in 2018

Born in Hevia, Siero, Asturias, Fidalgo joined Real Madrid's La Fábrica in 2012, from Sporting de Gijón. On 21 June 2016, after finishing his formation, he was loaned to Segunda División B side CF Rayo Majadahonda for the season.

Fidalgo made his senior debut on 20 August 2016, starting in a 0–0 draw against Sestao River Club. In July 2017, after being a regular starter, he returned to his parent club and was assigned to the reserves also in the third division.

Fidalgo made his first team debut for Real Madrid on 6 December 2018, coming on as a late substitute for Vinícius Júnior in a 6–1 home routing of UD Melilla, for the season's Copa del Rey. For the 2019–20 season, he was named team captain of Raúl's Castilla.

=== Castellón ===
On 25 August 2020, Fidalgo signed a three-year deal with Segunda División newcomers CD Castellón. He made his professional debut on 12 September, coming on as a second-half substitute for Jorge Fernández in a 2–1 away win against SD Ponferradina.

=== Club América ===
On 1 February 2021, despite featuring regularly at Castellón, Fidalgo joined Mexican club América on a season-long loan. On 2 June 2021, Club América confirmed the permanent signing of Fidalgo. During his time with the club, he helped the team secure three league championships.

=== Betis ===
On 1 February 2026, Fidalgo returned to Spain to join Real Betis.

== International career ==
In February 2026, FIFA approved Fidalgo's request to switch his international allegiance to Mexico, having previously represented Spain at youth level. The following month, Javier Aguirre called him up and made his senior debut on 28 March in a friendly against Portugal.

Fidalgo was named in the 26-man squad for the 2026 FIFA World Cup, hosted on home soil. He scored his first goal in the group stage match against the Czech Republic.

== Personal life ==
Fidalgo's grandfather Rafael was also a footballer. A defender, he played professionally for UP Langreo, Real Oviedo and Caudal Deportivo. He obtained Mexican citizenship after spending more than 5 years in the country.

== Career statistics ==
=== Club ===
As of match played on 25 October 2026

Appearances and goals by club, season and competition
| Club | Season | League | | | Copa del Rey | | Continental | | Other | | Total | |
| Club | Season | Division | Apps | Goals | Apps | Goals | Apps | Goals | Apps | Goals | Apps | Goals |
|---|---|---|---|---|---|---|---|---|---|---|---|---|
| Real Madrid Castilla | 2016–17 | Segunda División B | 0 | 0 | — | | — | | — | | 0 | 0 |
| Real Madrid Castilla | 2017–18 | Segunda División B | 26 | 4 | — | | — | | — | | 26 | 4 |
| Real Madrid Castilla | 2018–19 | Segunda División B | 38 | 5 | — | | — | | 2 (Note: Appearances in Segunda División B play-offs) | 0 | 40 | 5 |
| Real Madrid Castilla | 2019–20 | Segunda División B | 25 | 6 | — | | — | | — | | 25 | 6 |
| Real Madrid Castilla | Total | | 89 | 15 | — | | — | | 2 | 0 | 91 | 15 |
| Rayo Majadahonda (loan) | 2016–17 | Segunda División B | 31 | 0 | — | | — | | 2 | 0 | 33 | 0 |
| Real Madrid | 2018–19 | La Liga | 0 | 0 | 1 | 0 | — | | — | | 1 | 0 |
| Castellón | 2020–21 | Segunda División | 22 | 0 | 1 | 0 | — | | — | | 23 | 0 |
| América (loan) | 2020–21 | Liga MX | 12 | 0 | — | | 4 (Note: Appearances in CONCACAF Champions League/Cup) | 0 | — | | 16 | 0 |
| América | 2021–22 | Liga MX | 39 | 6 | — | | 3 | 0 | — | | 42 | 6 |
| América | 2022–23 | Liga MX | 41 | 3 | — | | — | | — | | 41 | 3 |
| América | 2023–24 | Liga MX | 41 | 2 | — | | 8 | 0 | 4 (Note: Appearances in Leagues Cup) | 0 | 53 | 2 |
| América | 2024–25 | Liga MX | 42 | 8 | — | | 4 | 2 | 6 (Note: One appearance in FIFA Club World Cup play-in, one appearance in Campeones Cup, one appearance in Supercopa de la Liga MX, three appearances in Leagues Cup) | 0 | 52 | 10 |
| América | 2025–26 | Liga MX | 21 | 1 | — | | — | | 3 (Note: One appearance in Campeón de Campeones, two appearances in Leagues Cup) | 0 | 24 | 1 |
| América | Total | | 196 | 20 | — | | 19 | 2 | 13 | 0 | 228 | 22 |
| Betis | 2025–26 | La Liga | 9 | 1 | 1 | 0 | 3 (Note: Appearances in UEFA Europa League) | 0 | — | | 13 | 1 |
| Betis | 2026–27 | La Liga | 4 | 0 | 0 | 0 | 1 (Note: Appearances in UEFA Champions League) | 0 | — | | 5 | 0 |
| Betis | Total | | 13 | 1 | 1 | 0 | 4 | 0 | — | | 18 | 1 |
| Career total | | | 351 | 36 | 3 | 0 | 23 | 2 | 17 | 0 | 394 | 38 |

=== International ===
As of match played on 17 November 2026

Appearances and goals by national team and year
| National team | Year | Apps | Goals |
|---|---|---|---|
| Mexico | 2026 | 12 | 1 |
| Total | | 12 | 1 |

Scores and results list Mexico's goal tally first, score column indicates score after each Fidalgo goal.

List of international goals scored by Álvaro Fidalgo
| No. | Date | Venue | Cap | Opponent | Score | Result | Competition |
|---|---|---|---|---|---|---|---|
| 1 | 24 June 2026 | Estadio Azteca, Mexico City, Mexico | 6 | Czech Republic | 3–0 | 3–0 | 2026 FIFA World Cup |

== Honours ==
América

- Liga MX: Apertura 2023, Clausura 2024, Apertura 2024
- Campeón de Campeones: 2024
- Supercopa de la Liga MX: 2024
- Campeones Cup: 2024

Individual

- Liga MX Best XI: Guardianes 2021, Apertura 2024, Clausura 2025
- CONCACAF Champions League Team of the Tournament: 2021
- Liga MX All-Star: 2022, 2024
- Liga MX Player of the Month: February 2025
