= Cristian Calderón =

Mexican footballer (born 1997)

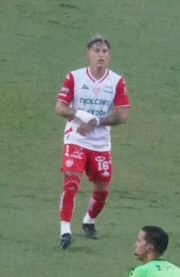
- Calderón with Necaxa in 2025

Personal information
- Full name: Cristian Yonathan Calderón Del Real
- Date of birth: 24 May 1997 (age 29)
- Place of birth: Tepic, Nayarit, Mexico
- Height: 1.75 m (5 ft 9 in)
- Position: Left-back

Team information
- Current team: Pumas UNAM
- Number: 12

Youth career
- 2012–2013: Nayarit
- 2013–2014: De los Altos
- 2014–2016: Atlas

Senior career*
Years	Team	Apps	(Gls)
2015–2018	Atlas	21	(0)
2019	Necaxa	36	(10)
2020–2023	Guadalajara	105	(9)
2020	→ Tapatío (loan)	3	(0)
2024–2026	América	54	(1)
2025–2026	→ Necaxa (loan)	28	(1)
2026–	Pumas UNAM	5	(0)

International career^{‡}
2018–2019	Mexico U21	2	(0)
2019	Mexico U23	4	(0)
2019	Mexico	4	(0)
Medal record
Men's football
Representing Mexico
Toulon Tournament
Third place	2019 France	Team
- * Club domestic league appearances and goals as of 18 October 2026 ‡ National team caps and goals as of 16 January 2020

Cristian Yonathan Calderón Del Real (born 24 May 1997), commonly known as Chicote, is a Mexican professional footballer who plays as a left-back for Liga MX club Pumas UNAM.

== Club career ==
=== Early career ===
Calderón participated in the youth teams of Coras de Nayarit FC and C.D. De los Altos before joining Altas' youth team.

=== Atlas ===
==== 2015–16: Debut season ====
Calderón made his professional debut with Altas on 21 October 2015 against Tijuana in a Copa MX quarter-finals match, ultimately winning 5–4 in a penalty shoot-out after a 2–2 tie. He made his Liga MX debut on 7 May 2016 against Tijuana, finishing in a scoreless draw.

==== 2018–19: Becoming first-choice ====
He became a starter for the first team in the 2018 Apertura.

=== Necaxa ===
He was signed by Necaxa for the 2019 Clausura. He made his debut for Necaxa on 5 March 2019, scoring his first goals as a brace against América, winning 3–1. At the end of the 2019 Apertura, he was listed in the Best XI of the tournament. According to a poll held by Mexican sports newspaper Récord, its readers voted Calderón as the best player of the tournament.

=== Guadalajara ===
==== 2019–20: Debut season and Liga MX Best XI ====
On 11 December 2019, Guadalajara reached an agreement to sign Calderón. On 18 January 2020, he made his league debut with the club coming on as a substitute against Pachuca in a 0–0 tie. Three days later, he would score his first goal with the club, scoring a stoppage-time header in a 2–1 loss against Dorados de Sinaloa during the first round-of-16 leg of the Copa MX. A week later in the second leg, he would score a bicycle kick in a 1–0 victory, helping send Guadalajara to a penalty shoot-out that was eventually lost.

==== 2020–21: Top performances and Guardianes semi-finalist ====
On 15 August 2020, Calderón scored the winning goal against Atlético San Luis in a 2–1 home victory, his first league goal with the club and giving newly appointed manager Victor Manuel Vucetich his first win with the club. In November 2020, facing rivals América during the Guardianes championship quarter-finals, he scored three times, all long-range shots from outside of the box, in the span of two legs giving Guadalajara a 3–1 aggregate victory.

=== América ===
On 3 January 2024, Calderón joined América on a free transfer.

==== 2025–26: Loan to Necaxa ====
On 1 July 2025, Necaxa officially announced the return of Calderón to the club, this time on loan.

=== Pumas UNAM ===
On 4 July 2026, Calderón signed with Pumas UNAM.

== International career ==
=== Youth ===
In May 2019, Calderón was called up by Jaime Lozano to participate in that year's Toulon Tournament. In the third-place match against the Republic of Ireland, he would score during the penalty shoot-out, helping Mexico win 4–3.

=== Senior ===
In September 2019, Calderón received his first call-up to the senior national team by Gerardo Martino and on 2 October 2019 in a friendly against Trinidad & Tobago, he made his debut. He started the game and was substituted at half-time.

== Career statistics ==
=== Club ===
As of 18 October 2026

Club	Season	League			Cup		Continental		Other		Total	
Club	Season	Division	Apps	Goals	Apps	Goals	Apps	Goals	Apps	Goals	Apps	Goals
Atlas	2015–16	Liga MX	1	0	2	0	—		—		3	0
Atlas	2016–17	Liga MX	—		3	0	—		—		3	0
Atlas	2017–18	Liga MX	5	0	7	0	—		—		12	0
Atlas	2018–19	Liga MX	15	0	4	0	—		—		19	0
Atlas	Total		21	0	16	0	—		—		37	0
Necaxa	2018–19	Liga MX	18	5	2 (Note: Appearances in Supercopa MX (one per year))	0	—		—		19	5
Necaxa	2019–20	Liga MX	18	5	—		—		—		18	5
Necaxa	Total		36	10	2	0	—		—		38	10
Guadalajara	2019–20	Liga MX	4	0	2	2	—		—		6	2
Guadalajara	2020–21	Liga MX	26	4	—		—		—		26	4
Guadalajara	2021–22	Liga MX	27	4	—		—		—		27	4
Guadalajara	2022–23	Liga MX	33	1	5 (Note: Appearances in Copa Sky por México)	0	—		2 (Note: Appearances in Leagues Cup (three in 2024))	0	40	1
Guadalajara	2023–24	Liga MX	15	0	—		—		2	0	17	0
Guadalajara	Total		105	9	7	2	—		4	0	116	11
Tapatío (loan)	2020–21	Liga de Expansión MX	2	0	—		—		—		2	0
Tapatío (loan)	2021–22	Liga de Expansión MX	1	0	—		—		—		1	0
Tapatío (loan)	Total		3	0	—		—		—		3	0
América	2023–24	Liga MX	20	0	1	0	6 (Note: Appearances in CONCACAF Champions Cup)	1	—		27	1
América	2024–25	Liga MX	34	1	—		3	0	5 (Note: One appearance in the 2024 Campeones Cup) (Note: One appearance in a 2025 FIFA Club World Cup qualification match)	0	42	1
América	Total		54	1	1	0	9	1	5	0	69	2
Necaxa (loan)	2025–26	Liga MX	28	1	—		—		2	0	30	1
Pumas UNAM	2026–27	Liga MX	5	0	—		—		1	0	6	0
Career total			252	21	26	2	9	1	12	0	299	24

=== International ===
As of match played on 19 November 2019

Mexico
Year	Apps	Goals
2019	4	0
Total	4	0

== Honours ==
América

- Liga MX: Clausura 2024, Apertura 2024
- Campeón de Campeones: 2024
- Supercopa de la Liga MX: 2024
- Campeones Cup: 2024

Individual

- Liga MX Best XI: Apertura 2019
- Récord Player of the Tournament: Apertura 2019
