= 2024 Supercopa de la Liga MX =

- Event: Supercopa de la Liga MX
América	Tigres
2	1
- Date: 30 June 2024
- Venue: Dignity Health Sports Park, Carson, United States
- Referee: Ismael Rosario López (Sinaloa)
- Attendance: 26,791

The 2024 Supercopa de la Liga MX was an official Mexican football match that took place on 30 June 2024. The match was the second edition of the Supercopa de la Liga MX, contested by the 2023 Campeón de Campeones and the 2024 Campeón de Campeones. This cup featured América, the 2024 champion, and Tigres, the 2023 champion. The match took place at Dignity Health Sports Park in Carson, California, which normally hosts the Campeón de Campeones. Like the Campeón de Campeones, this cup was contested at a neutral venue in the United States.

Due to América winning both the Apertura 2023 and Clausura 2024, they were automatically awarded the 2024 Campeón de Campeones title, the first club to earn the title in this manner since Atlas two seasons prior. However, due to commercial commitments in Liga MX, a match must be played in the United States as the kickoff of the 2024–25 Liga MX season, when the team faces the previous holder of the Campeón de Campeones, Tigres UANL on 30 June 2024.

América won the match, 2–1, securing their first Supercopa de la Liga MX title.

== Match details ==
30 June 2024
13:30 PDT

América	2–1	Tigres
Dilrosun 24'; Martín 35'	Report	Brunetta 7'

Dignity Health Sports Park, Carson
Attendance: 26,791
Referee: Ismael Rosario López (Sinaloa)

=== Details ===
América	Tigres

GK	30	(Mexico) Rodolfo Cota
DF	18	(Mexico) Cristian Calderón
DF	14	(Mexico) Néstor Araujo
DF	29	(Mexico) Ramón Juárez
DF	23	(Mexico) Emilio Lara		(substituted off) 63'
MF	8	(Spain) Álvaro Fidalgo
MF	6	(Mexico) Jonathan dos Santos
MF	16	(Mexico) Santiago Naveda	(yellow card) 59'
MF	24	(Netherlands) Javairô Dilrosun
MF	17	(United States) Alejandro Zendejas
FW	21	(Mexico) Henry Martín (c)
Substitutions:
GK	12	(Mexico) Jonathan Estrada
DF	32	(Mexico) Miguel Vázquez
DF	193	(Mexico) Franco Rossano
MF	15	(Mexico) José Iván Rodríguez
MF	185	(Mexico) Aarón Arredondo
MF	197	(Mexico) Dagoberto Espinoza		(substituted on) 63'
MF	210	(Mexico) Miguel Ramírez
FW	34	(Mexico) Esteban Lozano
FW	214	(Mexico) Patricio Salas
FW	303	(Mexico) Diego Reyes
Manager:
(Brazil) André Jardine

GK	25	(Mexico) Carlos Felipe Rodríguez
DF	13	(Mexico) Diego Reyes
DF	27	(Mexico) Jesús Angulo	(yellow card) 63'	(substituted off) 79'
DF	19	(Argentina) Guido Pizarro (c)	(yellow card) 34'
DF	5	(Brazil) Rafael Carioca
MF	8	(Mexico) Fernando Gorriarán
MF	11	(Argentina) Juan Brunetta		(substituted off) 79'
MF	15	(Mexico) Sebastián Córdova
MF	20	(Mexico) Javier Aquino
MF	23	(Colombia) Luis Quiñones		(substituted off) 60'
FW	10	(France) André-Pierre Gignac
Substitutions:
GK	30	(Mexico) Miguel Ortega
DF	3	(Brazil) Samir
DF	4	(Mexico) Juanjo Purata		(substituted on) 79'
DF	15	(Mexico) Eduardo Tercero
MF	6	(Mexico) Juan Pablo Vigón
MF	14	(Mexico) Jesús Garza
MF	21	(Mexico) Eugenio Pizzuto
MF	26	(Mexico) Sebastián Fierro
FW	9	(Argentina) Nicolás Ibáñez		(substituted on) 79'
FW	29	(Mexico) Ozziel Herrera		(substituted on) 60'
Manager:
(Serbia) Veljko Paunović

Assistant referees:
José Ibrahim Martínez (Mexico City)
Leonardo Javier Castillo (State of México)
Fourth official:
Jorge Abraham Camacho (Jalisco)
Video assistant referee:
Luis Enrique Santander (Guanajuato)
Assistant video assistant referee:
Michel Caballero Galicia (Morelos)

== See also ==
- Campeón de Campeones
- Supercopa MX
