= Jonathan Estrada (footballer, born 1998) =

Mexican footballer

Personal information
- Full name: Jonathan Estrada Barajas
- Date of birth: 16 March 1998 (age 28)
- Place of birth: Guadalajara, Jalisco, Mexico
- Height: 1.85 m (6 ft 1 in)
- Position: Goalkeeper

Team information
- Current team: Atlético La Paz
- Number: 23

Youth career
- 2013–2017: Atlas

Senior career*
Years	Team	Apps	(Gls)
2017–2019	Atlas	1	(0)
2019–2020	CAFESSA Jalisco	6	(0)
2020–2021	Tepatitlán	4	(0)
2021–2022	Mazorqueros	10	(0)
2022–	Atlético La Paz	42	(0)
2024–2025	→ América (loan)	0	(0)
- * Club domestic league appearances and goals as of 21 October 2022

Jonathan Estrada Barajas (born 16 March 1998) is a Mexican professional footballer who plays as a goalkeeper for Liga de Expansión MX club Atlético La Paz.

== Honours ==
Tepatitlán

- Liga de Expansión MX: Guardianes 2021

América

- Liga MX: Apertura 2024
- Supercopa de la Liga MX: 2024
- Campeones Cup: 2024
