= Joshua Strimling =

Israeli footballer (born 2004)

Joshua Strimling יהושע שטרימלינג
Personal information
- Full name: Joshua Strimling Curiel
- Date of birth: 19 March 2004 (age 22)
- Place of birth: Mexico City, Mexico
- Height: 1.90 m (6 ft 3 in)
- Position: Defender

Team information
- Current team: América

Youth career
- –2020: Hapoel Kfar Saba

Senior career*
Years	Team	Apps	(Gls)
2020–2024	Hapoel Kfar Saba	33	(0)
2024–	América	0	(0)
- * Club domestic league appearances and goals as of 30 August 2024

Joshua Strimling Curiel (Hebrew: יהושע שטרימלינג; born 19 March 2004) is an Israeli footballer who plays as a defender for América.

== Life and career ==
Strimling was born on 19 March 2003 in Mexico City. He holds Israeli citizenship. As a youth player, he joined the youth academy of Israeli side Hapoel Kfar Saba. He started his senior career with Israeli side Hapoel Kfar Saba. On 20 March 2021, he debuted for the club during a Ironi Kiryat Shmona. He suffered relegation while playing for them. He made thirty-five appearances and scored zero goals while playing for them. After that, he almost signed for Mexican side Chivas. In 2024, he signed for Mexican side América.

== Style of play ==
Strimling mainly operates as a defender. He specifically operates as a center-back. He is known for his height. He is also known for his aerial ability.
