= Miguel Vázquez (footballer) =

Mexican footballer (born 2004)

Personal information
- Full name: Miguel Ángel Vázquez García
- Date of birth: 7 February 2004 (age 22)
- Place of birth: San Luis de la Paz, Guanajuato, Mexico
- Height: 1.80 m (5 ft 11 in)
- Position: Centre-back

Team information
- Current team: América
- Number: 32

Youth career
- 2018–2021: Querétaro
- 2020: → Atlético San Luis (loan)
- 2021–: América

Senior career*
Years	Team	Apps	(Gls)
2022–	América	32	(0)
- * Club domestic league appearances and goals as of 28 October 2026

Miguel Ángel Vázquez García (born 7 February 2004) is a Mexican professional footballer who plays as a centre-back for Liga MX club América.

== Career statistics ==
=== Club ===
As of match played on 28 October 2026

Club	Season	League			Cup		Continental		Intercontinental		Other		Total	
Club	Season	Division	Apps	Goals	Apps	Goals	Apps	Goals	Apps	Goals	Apps	Goals	Apps	Goals
América	2022–23	Liga MX	1	0	—		—		—		—		1	0
América	2024–25	Liga MX	13	0	1 (Note: Appearance in Campeón de Campeones)	0	—		—		—		14	0
América	2025–26	Liga MX	11	0	—		3 (Note: Appearances in CONCACAF Champions Cup)	0	1 (Note: Appearance in Club World Cup play-in)	0	—		15	0
América	2026–27	Liga MX	7	0	—		—		—		2 (Note: Appearance in Leagues Cup)	0	9	0
Career total			32	0	1	0	3	0	1	0	2	0	39	0

== Honours ==
América

- Liga MX: Apertura 2024
- Supercopa de la Liga MX: 2024
- Campeones Cup: 2024
