= Diego Valdés (Chilean footballer) =

Chilean footballer (born 1994)

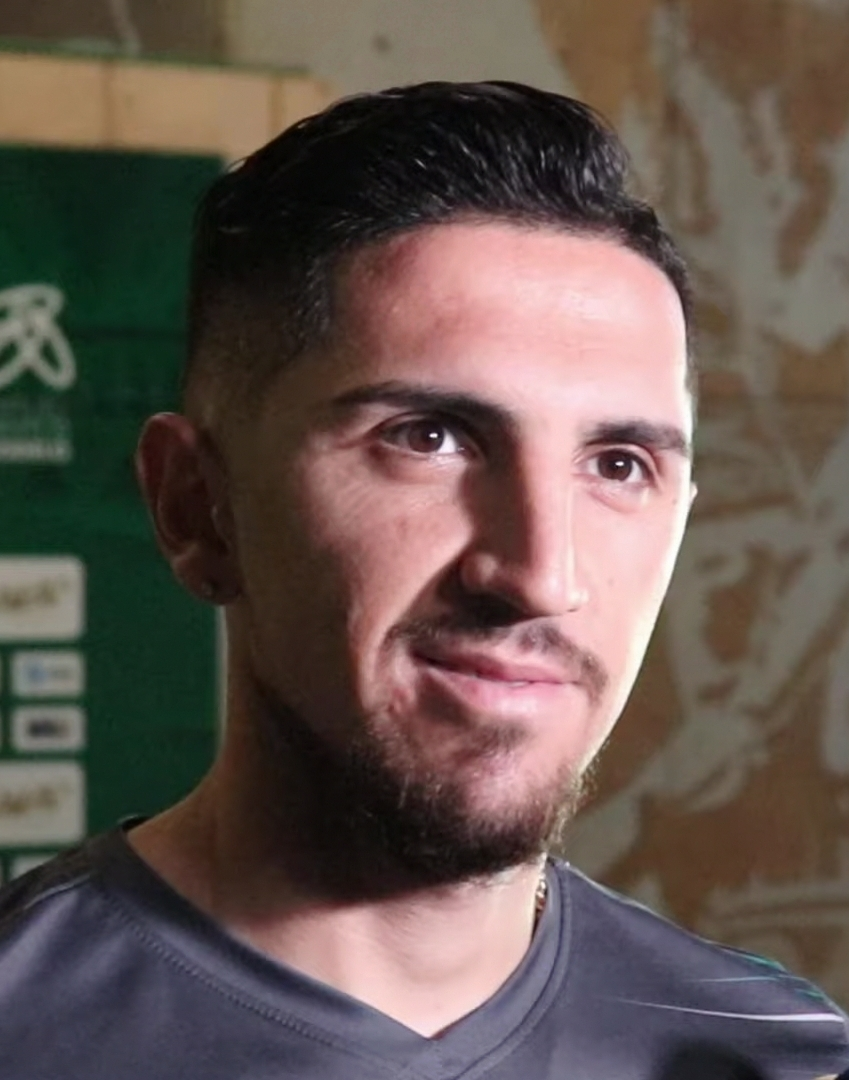
- Valdés in 2019

Personal information
- Full name: Diego Alfonso Valdés Contreras
- Date of birth: 30 January 1994 (age 32)
- Place of birth: Puente Alto, Santiago, Chile
- Height: 1.78 m (5 ft 10 in)
- Position: Attacking midfielder

Team information
- Current team: Vélez Sarsfield
- Number: 10

Youth career
- 2004–2014: Audax Italiano

Senior career*
Years	Team	Apps	(Gls)
2014–2016	Audax Italiano	63	(13)
2016–2018	Morelia	90	(12)
2019–2021	Santos Laguna	90	(19)
2022–2025	América	124	(33)
2025–	Vélez Sarsfield	23	(1)

International career^{‡}
2015–2025	Chile	37	(2)
- * Club domestic league appearances and goals as of 16:55, 16 June 2026 (UTC) ‡ National team caps and goals as of 20 March 2025

Diego Alfonso Valdés Contreras (born 30 January 1994) is a Chilean professional footballer who plays as an attacking midfielder for Primera División club Vélez Sarsfield and the Chile national team.

== Club career ==
=== Audax Italiano ===
He made his professional debut in 2012, in a match against Universidad Católica for the Chilean Primera División.

=== Morelia ===
Valdés joined Monarcas Morelia from Audax Italiano on June 14, 2016, on a two million dollar move. Valdés made his debut on July 15, 2016, against Club Tijuana losing 2–0.

=== América ===
Valdés joined América from Santos Laguna on January 1, 2022. On 30 August 2023, Valdés renewed his contract with America until 2026. Valdés won the Liga MX with America on 17 December 2023. He ended his contract at the end of the 2024–25 season.

=== Vélez Sarsfield ===
On 21 June 2025, Valdés signed with Vélez Sarsfield on a deal until December 2027.

== International career ==
Valdés was expected to play for the Chile national under-20 football team in the 2013 South American Youth Championship in Argentina. However, he was left out of the team at the last minute by manager Mario Salas.

The team's performance in Argentina qualified them for a place in the Turkey 2013 under-20 World Cup and when team member Diego Rojas was injured and unable to play, Valdés was selected to take his place.

He got his first call up to the senior Chile squad for a friendly against the United States in January 2015 and made his international debut in the match.

== Career statistics ==
=== International ===
As of match played 25 March 2025.

Appearances and goals by national team and year
National team	Year	Apps	Goals
Chile	2015	1	0
Chile	2018	8	1
Chile	2019	2	0
Chile	2021	6	0
Chile	2022	3	0
Chile	2023	8	1
Chile	2024	5	0
Chile	2025	2	0
Total		37	2

=== International goals ===
Scores and results list Chile's goal tally first.

No.	Date	Venue	Opponent	Score	Result	Competition
1.	8 June 2018	Stadion Miejski, Poznań, Poland	Poland	1–2	2–2	Friendly
2.	12 October 2023	Estadio Monumental David Arellano, Santiago, Chile	Peru	1–0	2–0	2026 FIFA World Cup qualification

== Racism controversy ==
On September 10, 2018, a day before a friendly match between Chile and South Korea, Valdés made a racist gesture, slanting his eyes with his hands at a fan publicity event. The gesture was reported internationally and created furor in South Korea, resulting in Valdés posting an apology widely seen as inadequate. This was the second racist incident in Korea from a visiting South American team, following a similar incident in 2017 in which Colombian football player Edwin Cardona was banned for five games by FIFA after making a similar gesture.

== Honours ==
América

- Liga MX: Apertura 2023, Clausura 2024, Apertura 2024
- Campeón de Campeones: 2024
- Campeones Cup: 2024

Individual

- Liga MX Best XI: Apertura 2021, Clausura 2022
- Liga MX All-Star: 2021
- Liga MX Best Offensive Midfielder: 2022–23
