= André Jardine =

Brazilian association football manager (born 1979)

Personal information
- Full name: André Soares Jardine
- Date of birth: 8 September 1979 (age 47)
- Place of birth: Porto Alegre, Brazil

Team information
- Current team: Shabab Al Ahli (head coach)

Youth career
- Years: Team
- Grêmio

Managerial career
- 2003–2013: Internacional (youth)
- 2013–2014: Grêmio (youth)
- 2014: Grêmio (caretaker)
- 2014: Grêmio (assistant)
- 2015–2018: São Paulo U20
- 2016: São Paulo (caretaker)
- 2017: São Paulo U23
- 2018: São Paulo (assistant)
- 2018: São Paulo (caretaker)
- 2019: São Paulo
- 2019–2022: Brazil U20
- 2019–2022: Brazil U23
- 2022–2023: Atlético San Luis
- 2023–2026: América
- 2026–: Shabab Al Ahli
Medal record
Men's football
Representing Brazil (as head coach)
Olympic Games
| Gold medal – first place | 2020 Tokyo | Team |

André Soares Jardine (born 8 September 1979) is a Brazilian professional football manager. He is the current head coach of UAE Pro League club Shabab Al Ahli.

== Early life ==
Jardine was born in Porto Alegre, Rio Grande do Sul. After representing Grêmio's youth categories, he started studying Engineering but graduated in Physical Education at the Federal University of Rio Grande do Sul.

== Career ==
=== Internacional ===
Jardine joined Internacional in 2003, being appointed manager of the under-10s. He took over all the club's youth categories during his ten-year stay, with his last team being the under-20s.

=== Grêmio ===
On 24 September 2013, he returned to Grêmio after being named under-17 manager.

On 27 July 2014, after Enderson Moreira's dismissal, Jardine was named interim manager, being in charge for one match (a 2–1 loss against Vitória) before the appointment of Luiz Felipe Scolari. Subsequently, he was named assistant, but ended the year as the coordinator of the under-15s after having altercations with Scolari.

=== São Paulo ===
In February 2015, Jardine moved to São Paulo and was appointed at the helm of the under-20s. He was interim manager on two occasions (in 2016 and 2018) before being named assistant in March 2018. On 11 November 2018, he was named interim until the end of the campaign, replacing sacked Diego Aguirre.

On 25 November 2018, Jardine was appointed manager of Tricolor for the 2019 season. The following 14 February, however, he was removed from his manager role, but remained at the club.

=== Brazil ===
On 3 April 2019, Jardine took over the Brazil national under-20 team, replacing Carlos Amadeu. Later that year, he became the manager of the under-23s. Brazil went on to win the gold at the 2020 Summer Olympics defeating Spain in the final.

=== San Luis ===
On 3 February 2022, Jardine took over Liga MX side Atlético San Luis.

=== Club América ===
On 16 June 2023, Club América reached an agreement with Atlético San Luis and appointed Jardine as their new manager. He became the third Brazilian manager in the club's history after Jorge Vieira and Paulo Roberto Falcão.

On 17 December 2023, Club América defeated Tigres UANL to win its 14th championship, making Jardine one of only five managers in the history of the club to win the league trophy in their debut campaign. Six months later, Club América won its 15th championship, beating Cruz Azul 2–1 on aggregate.

On 15 December 2024, Club América won its third consecutive league championship under Jardine, defeating Monterrey to become the first tricampeón of Mexican football in its current format. The following Clausura, Jardine led the club to a fourth consecutive final, finishing as runners-up to Toluca.

On 3 June 2026, Jardine and Club América parted ways by mutual agreement.

=== Shabab Al Ahli ===
On 17 June 2026, UAE Pro League club Shabab Al Ahli appointed Jardine as their new head coach.

== Managerial statistics ==
As of 13 October 2026

Managerial record by team and tenure
| Team | Nat. | From | To | Record | | | | | | | | Ref |
| Team | Nat. | From | To | G | W | D | L | GF | GA | GD | Win % | Ref |
|---|---|---|---|---|---|---|---|---|---|---|---|---|
| Grêmio (interim) | (Brazil) | 2 August 2014 | 15 August 2014 | 2 | 0 | 0 | 2 | 1 | 4 | −3 | 0.00 | |
| São Paulo | (Brazil) | 25 November 2018 | 14 February 2019 | 10 | 3 | 2 | 5 | 8 | 8 | +0 | 30.00 | |
| Brazil U-20 | (Brazil) | 3 April 2019 | 31 December 2020 | 3 | 2 | 1 | 0 | 9 | 1 | +8 | 66.67 | |
| Brazil U-23 | (Brazil) | 3 April 2019 | 2 February 2022 | 26 | 20 | 3 | 3 | 70 | 27 | +43 | 76.92 | |
| Atlético San Luis | (Mexico) | 3 February 2022 | 16 June 2023 | 56 | 18 | 14 | 24 | 66 | 81 | −15 | 32.14 | |
| Club América | (Mexico) | 16 June 2023 | 3 June 2026 | 159 | 79 | 47 | 33 | 269 | 152 | +117 | 49.69 | |
| Shabab Al Ahli | (United Arab Emirates) | 17 June 2026 | present | 10 | 6 | 3 | 1 | 18 | 10 | +8 | 60.00 | |
| Career total | | | | 266 | 128 | 70 | 68 | 441 | 283 | +158 | 48.12 | — |

== Honours ==
América

- Liga MX: Apertura 2023, Clausura 2024, Apertura 2024
- Campeón de Campeones: 2024
- Supercopa de la Liga MX: 2024
- Campeones Cup: 2024

Brazil U23

- Toulon Tournament: 2019
- Summer Olympics: 2020

São Paulo U20

- U-20 Copa Libertadores: 2016

Individual

- IFFHS Olympic Coach of the Tournament: 2020
- Liga MX Best Manager: 2023–24
- Liga MX All-Star: 2024, 2025
- Liga MX Best XI Manager: Clausura 2024, Apertura 2024
- The Best of America Best Liga MX Manager: 2023, 2024
- Liga MX Manager of the Month: December 2024, January 2025, February 2025, August 2025
