= 2024 Campeones Cup =

Soccer match in Columbus

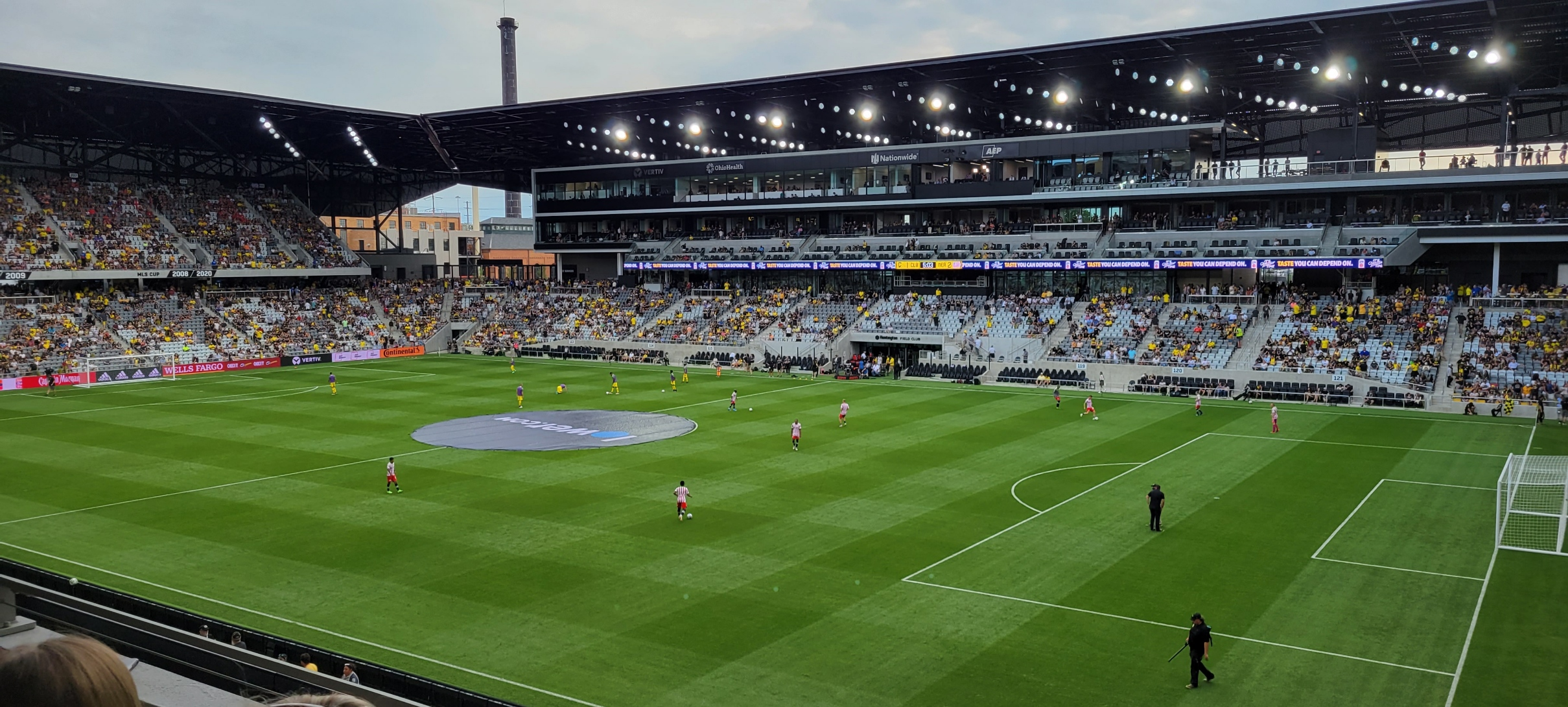
- Lower.com Field in Columbus, Ohio hosted the match
- Event: Campeones Cup
| Columbus Crew | América |
| (United States Soccer Federation) | (Mexican Football Federation) |
| 1 | 1 |
- América won 5–4 on penalties
- Date: September 25, 2024
- Venue: Lower.com Field, Columbus, Ohio
- Man of the Match: Luis Malagón (América)
- Referee: Walter López (Guatemala)
- Attendance: 20,198

The 2024 Campeones Cup was the sixth edition of the Campeones Cup, an annual North American soccer match contested between the reigning champion of Major League Soccer and the winner of the Campeón de Campeones of Liga MX.

The match featured the Columbus Crew, winners of the 2023 MLS Cup, and América, the winners of the 2024 Campeón de Campeones. (Note: Although the winner of the Campeón de Campeones was determined by the champions of both Apertura and Clausura tournaments, América won the Campeón de Campeones title automatically by winning both the 2023 Apertura and 2024 Clausura seasons.) The Columbus Crew hosted the match on September 25, 2024, at the Lower.com Field in Columbus, Ohio, United States.

== Match ==
=== Details ===
September 25, 2024
7:30 p.m. EDT (UTC−4)

| Columbus Crew (United States Soccer Federation) | 1–1 | (Mexican Football Federation) América |
|---|---|---|
| Amundsen 77' | Report | Dávila 68' |
Penalties
| Camacho (penalty scored); Mățan (penalty missed); Russell-Rowe (penalty scored); Hernández (penalty scored); Jones (penalty scored); Jackson (penalty missed); Amundsen (penalty missed) | 4–5 | (penalty scored) Valdés; (penalty missed) R. Sánchez; (penalty scored) Aguirre; (penalty scored) Fidalgo; (penalty scored) Dávila; (penalty missed) Juárez; (penalty scored) Araujo |

Lower.com Field, Columbus, Ohio
Attendance: 20,198
Referee: Walter López (Guatemala)

| Columbus Crew | América |

| Substitutes: Manager: (France) Wilfried Nancy | Substitutes: Manager: (Brazil) André Jardine |
