= 2026–27 Club América season =

América
2026–27 season
- President: Santiago Baños
- Manager: Guillermo Almada
- Stadium: Estadio Azteca
- Apertura: Regular phase: 3rd
- Leagues Cup: 4th
- CONCACAF Champions Cup: Round one
- Top goalscorer: League: Miguel Borja; Henry Martín; Brian Rodríguez (3 each); All: Brian Rodríguez (6)
- Highest home attendance: 72,990 v Guadalajara (19 September 2026, Apertura)
- Lowest home attendance: 25,634 v Atlético San Luis (16 August 2026, Apertura)
- Average home league attendance: 39,943
- Biggest win: 3–0 v Santos Laguna (H) (2 August 2026, Apertura); 3–0 v Atlético San Luis (H) (16 August 2026, Apertura)
- Biggest defeat: 0–1 v León (N) (6 September 2026, Leagues Cup); 3–4 v Cruz Azul (A) (12 September 2026, Apertura)
Home colours	Away colours
- All statistics correct as of 19 September 2026.

The 2026–27 Club América season is the club's 82nd consecutive season in the top-flight of Mexican football. In addition to the domestic league, the club will also participate in the Leagues Cup and the CONCACAF Champions Cup.

This season will be the first since 2021–22 without vice-captain Jonathan dos Santos, who departed as a free agent following the expiration of his contract.

== Squad information ==
=== Coaching staff ===
Position	Staff
Manager	(Uruguay) Guillermo Almada
Assistant managers	(Uruguay) Darwin Quintana
Assistant managers	(Uruguay) Gianni Michelini
Assistant managers	(Mexico) Raúl Lara
Assistant managers	(Spain) Xavier Mayol
Goalkeeper coach	(Mexico) Luis Gurrola
Fitness coaches	(Uruguay) Rubens Valenzuela
Fitness coaches	(Mexico) Francisco Martínez
Physiotherapists	(Argentina) Fernando Gilardi
Physiotherapists	(Mexico) Octavio Luna
Physiotherapists	(Mexico) Francisco Faustino
Team doctors	(Mexico) Alfonso Díaz
Team doctors	(Mexico) José Guadalupe Vázquez
Team doctors	(Argentina) Christian Motta

Source: Club América

=== Players ===
No.	Pos.	Nat.	Name	Date of birth (age)	Since	From
Goalkeepers
1	GK	(Mexico)	Luis Malagón	2 March 1997 (age 29)	2023	(Mexico) Necaxa
21	GK	(Mexico)	Fernando Tapia	17 June 2001 (age 25)	2026	(Mexico) UANL
30	GK	(Mexico)	Rodolfo Cota	3 July 1987 (age 39)	2024	(Mexico) León
31	GK	(Mexico)	César Lugo	15 May 2003 (age 23)	2026	Academy
Defenders
2	DF	(Mexico)	Emilio Lara	18 May 2002 (age 24)	2021	Academy
3	DF	(Mexico)	Israel Reyes	23 May 2000 (age 26)	2023	(Mexico) Puebla
5	DF	(Mexico)	Kevin Álvarez	15 January 1999 (age 27)	2023	(Mexico) Pachuca
14	DF	(Uruguay)	Santiago Bueno	9 November 1998 (age 27)	2026	(England) Wolverhampton Wanderers
15	DF	(Argentina)	Santiago Ramos	6 February 2001 (age 25)	2026	(Brazil) Bahia
24	DF	(Mexico)	Franco Rossano	27 July 2005 (age 21)	2024	Academy
26	DF	(Colombia)	Cristian Borja	18 February 1993 (age 33)	2024	(Portugal) Braga
29	DF	(Mexico)	Ramón Juárez	9 May 2001 (age 25)	2019	Academy
32	DF	(Mexico)	Miguel Vásquez	7 February 2004 (age 22)	2022	Academy
Midfielders
6	MF	(United States)	Edwin Cerrillo	3 October 2000 (age 26)	2026	(United States) LA Galaxy
8	MF	(Spain)	Carlos Álvarez	6 August 2003 (age 23)	2026	(Spain) Levante
10	MF	(United States)	Alejandro Zendejas	7 February 1998 (age 28)	2022	(Mexico) Necaxa
12	MF	(Mexico)	Isaías Violante	20 October 2003 (age 22)	2025	(Mexico) Toluca
13	MF	(Mexico)	Alan Cervantes	17 January 1998 (age 28)	2024	(Mexico) Santos Laguna
20	MF	(Mexico)	Alexis Gutiérrez	26 February 2000 (age 26)	2025	(Mexico) Cruz Azul
22	MF	(Colombia)	Óscar Perea	27 September 2005 (age 21)	2026	(France) Strasbourg
23	MF	(Brazil)	Raphael Veiga	19 June 1995 (age 31)	2026	(Brazil) Palmeiras
27	MF	(Brazil)	Ícaro	23 May 2007 (age 19)	2026	Academy
28	MF	(Mexico)	Érick Sánchez	27 September 1999 (age 27)	2024	(Mexico) Pachuca
34	MF	(Mexico)	Dagoberto Espinoza	17 April 2004 (age 22)	2024	Academy
Forwards
7	FW	(Uruguay)	Brian Rodríguez	20 May 2000 (age 26)	2022	(United States) Los Angeles FC
9	FW	(Mexico)	Henry Martín	18 September 1992 (age 34)	2018	(Mexico) Tijuana
11	FW	(Chile)	Víctor Dávila	4 November 1997 (age 28)	2024	(Russia) CSKA Moscow
19	FW	(Colombia)	Raúl Zúñiga	13 July 1994 (age 32)	2025	(Mexico) Tijuana
93	FW	(Colombia)	Miguel Borja	26 January 1993 (age 33)	2026	(United Arab Emirates) Al Wasl

Players and squad numbers last updated on 11 September 2026.
Note: Flags indicate national team as has been defined under FIFA eligibility rules. Players may hold more than one non-FIFA nationality.

== Transfers ==
=== In ===
==== Summer ====
No.	Pos.	Player	Transfer from	Fee	Date	Source
24	DF	(Mexico) Franco Rossano	(Mexico) Necaxa	End of loan	1 June 2026	
2	DF	(Mexico) Emilio Lara	(Mexico) Necaxa	End of loan	1 June 2026	
22	DF	(Uruguay) Thiago Espinosa	(Uruguay) Racing	$2,000,000	9 July 2026	
22	MF	(Colombia) Óscar Perea	(France) Strasbourg	On loan	28 July 2026	
6	MF	(United States) Edwin Cerrillo	(United States) LA Galaxy	Undisclosed	2 August 2026	
93	FW	(Colombia) Miguel Borja	(United Arab Emirates) Al Wasl	$2,500,000	20 August 2026	
8	MF	(Spain) Carlos Álvarez	(Spain) Levante	$6,000,000	2 September 2026	
14	DF	(Uruguay) Santiago Bueno	(England) Wolverhampton Wanderers	On loan	11 September 2026	
15	DF	(Argentina) Santiago Ramos	(Brazil) Bahia	$10,000,000	11 September 2026	
Total				$20.5 million		

=== Out ===
==== Summer ====
No.	Pos.	Player	Transfer to	Fee	Date	Source
6	MF	(Mexico) Jonathan dos Santos	End of contract (Note: Eventually retired)		1 July 2026	
14	DF	(Mexico) Néstor Araujo	End of contract (Note: Eventually joined Chaves)		1 July 2026	
15	DF	(United States) Ralph Orquin	End of contract (Note: Eventually joined Cruz Azul)		1 July 2026	
18	DF	(Mexico) Aarón Mejía	(Mexico) Tijuana	End of loan	1 July 2026	
–	DF	(Mexico) Cristian Calderón	(Mexico) UNAM	Undisclosed	4 July 2026	
22	DF	(Uruguay) Thiago Espinosa	(Uruguay) Peñarol	On loan	18 July 2026	
17	MF	(Brazil) Rodrigo Dourado	(Mexico) Juárez	On loan	8 August 2026	
36	MF	(United States) Miguel Ramírez	(Mexico) Tlaxcala	Undisclosed	28 August 2026	
37	FW	(Mexico) Esteban Lozano	(Mexico) Santos Laguna	On loan	31 August 2026	
4	DF	(Uruguay) Sebastián Cáceres	(Spain) Celta Vigo	$8,000,000	1 September 2026	
33	FW	(Mexico) Patricio Salas	(Portugal) Famalicão	On loan	2 September 2026	
35	MC	(Mexico) Santiago Naveda	(Mexico) Venados	On loan	7 September 2026	
Total				$8.0 million		

== Pre-season and friendlies ==
On 9 June 2026, Major League Soccer side LA Galaxy announced that they would host América in a friendly match. On 18 June, Jaiba Brava announced they would host América at the Estadio Tamaulipas ahead of their season. On 28 June, América announced that it had played a behind closed doors friendly match against Trival Valderas. On 25 August, América's rivals, Guadalajara, announced that the two teams would play a friendly match at the Oakland Coliseum. On September 4, América announced a friendly Clásico Joven match against Cruz Azul at the Snapdragon Stadium in San Diego.

Win Draw Loss Fixtures

28 June 2026 Friendly	Trival Valderas (Spain)	0–2	(Mexico) América	Fuenlabrada, Spain
14:00 CEST		Report	Veiga; Martín (pen.)	Stadium: Estadio Raúl González Blanco; Attendance: 0 (behind closed doors)

4 July 2026 Friendly	Jaiba Brava (Mexico)	0–2	(Mexico) América	Tampico, Mexico
20:00 CDT		Report	Gutiérrez 40'; Cervantes 84' (pen.)	Stadium: Estadio Tamaulipas; Attendance: 19,667; Referee: Jesús Herrera Armenta

11 July 2026 Friendly	LA Galaxy (United States)	1–0	(Mexico) América	Carson, United States
19:30 PDT	Paintsil 26'	Report		Stadium: Dignity Health Sports Park; Referee: Victor Rivas (United States)

1 October 2026 Friendly	América (Mexico)	0–0	(Mexico) Cruz Azul	San Diego, United States
19:30 PDT				Stadium: Snapdragon Stadium; Referee: Tim Ford (United States)

4 October 2026 El Clásico de México	Guadalajara (Mexico)	2–0	(Mexico) América	Oakland, United States
17:30 PDT	Sepúlveda 14' (pen.), 22'			Stadium: Oakland Coliseum

== Competitions ==
=== Overview ===
Competition	First match	Last match	Starting round	Final position	Record							
Competition	First match	Last match	Starting round	Final position	Pld	W	D	L	GF	GA	GD	Win %
Apertura	18 July 2026	TBD	Matchday 1	TBD	8	5	2	1	17	8	+9	62.50
Clausura	January 2027	TBD	Matchday 1	TBD	0	0	0	0	0	0	+0	—
Leagues Cup	6 August 2026	6 September 2026	League phase	4th	6	3	2	1	11	6	+5	50.00
CONCACAF Champions Cup	February 2027	TBD	Round one	TBD	0	0	0	0	0	0	+0	—
Total					14	8	4	2	28	14	+14	57.14

Last updated: 19 September 2026
Source: Competitions

=== Apertura 2026 ===
==== League table ====
Pos	Team	Pld	W	D	L	GF	GA	GD	Pts	Qualification
1	América	10	6	3	1	22	11	+11	21	Qualification for the quarter–finals (Note: The first eight places in the table will qualify for the Liguilla quarter-finals.)
2	Toluca	11	6	2	3	25	15	+10	20	Qualification for the quarter–finals
3	Querétaro	10	6	2	2	15	8	+7	20	Qualification for the quarter–finals
4	Guadalajara	11	5	4	2	18	11	+7	19	Qualification for the quarter–finals
5	León	11	5	3	3	15	12	+3	18	Qualification for the quarter–finals

Updated to match(es) played on 11 October 2026. Source: Liga MX
Rules for classification: 1) Points; 2) Goal difference; 3) Number of goals scored; 4) Head-to-head results between tied teams; 5) Number of goals scored away; 6) Highest relegation coefficient; 7) Fair Play points

==== Results summary ====
Overall								Home						Away					
Pld	W	D	L	GF	GA	GD	Pts	W	D	L	GF	GA	GD	W	D	L	GF	GA	GD
8	5	2	1	17	8	+9	17	3	1	0	10	2	+8	2	1	1	7	6	+1

Last updated: 19 September 2026.
Source: Liga MX

==== Results by round ====
Round	1	2	3	4	5	6	8	9	10	11	12	13	14	7^{1}	15	16	17
Ground	A	A	H	H	A	H	A	H	A	H	A	A	H	H	H	A	A
Result	W	D	W	W	W	W	L	D	W	D							
Position	8	5	1	1	1	1	2	3	2	1							
Points	3	4	7	10	13	16	16	17	20	21							

Updated to match(es) played on 10 October 2026. Source: Liga MX
A = Away; H = Home; W = Win; D = Draw; L = Loss; P = Postponed
Notes:
- ^{1} Matchday 7 (v. Tijuana) was postponed due to América's participation in the Leagues Cup.

==== Regular phase ====
The league fixtures were announced on 9 June 2026.

Win Draw Loss Fixtures

18 July 2026 1	Querétaro	0–1	América	Querétaro
21:10 CST	Homenchenko (yellow card) 23'; B. Duarte (yellow card) 65'; Abascia (yellow card) 70'; Reyes (yellow card) 71'; Paulo Victor (yellow card) 81'; Parra (yellow card) 90+7'	Report	Cervantes (yellow card) 27' (yellow-red card) 88'; Álvarez (yellow card) 42'; Juárez (yellow card) 70'; Martín (penalty missed) 73'; Violante 83'	Stadium: Estadio Corregidora; Attendance: 30,229; Referee: Luis Enrique Santander

24 July 2026 2	Atlante	1–1	América	Mexico City
21:00 CST	Pizzuto 65'; E. Jiménez (yellow card) 89'	Report	Borja 21'; Álvarez (yellow card) 41'; É. Sánchez (yellow card) 67'; Martín (yellow card) 67'	Stadium: Estadio Azteca; Attendance: 58,576; Referee: Katia Itzel García

2 August 2026 3	América	3–0	Santos Laguna	Mexico City
17:00 CST	Martín 2'; Rodríguez 73'; Cárdenas 90'	Report	F. Sánchez (yellow card) 30'	Stadium: Estadio Azteca; Attendance: 31,368; Referee: Víctor Cáceres Hernández

16 August 2026 4	América	3–0	Atlético San Luis	Mexico City
17:00 CST	Ícaro (yellow card) 12'; Martín (yellow card) 21'; Veiga 26'; Perea 52'; D. Arriaga 66'	Report	Bambu (yellow card) 21' (yellow-red card) 47'	Stadium: Estadio Azteca; Attendance: 25,634; Referee: Maximiliano Quintero Hernández

21 August 2026 5	Juárez	1–2	América	Ciudad Juárez
21:00 CST	Madson (yellow card) 11'; Estupiñán 33'; Murillo (yellow card) 41'; Aquino (yellow card) 52'; Torres (yellow card) 77'; Nevárez (yellow card) 82'	Report	Martín 38', 53' (pen.); Veiga (yellow card) 90+7'	Stadium: Estadio Olímpico Benito Juárez; Attendance: 17,497; Referee: Ismael López Peñuelas

29 August 2026 6	América	2–0	Puebla	Mexico City
19:00 CST	Ícaro 24'; B. Rodríguez 77'	Report	S. Sanabria (yellow card) 69'	Stadium: Estadio Azteca; Attendance: 29,778; Referee: Salvador Pérez Villalobos

12 September 2026 8	Cruz Azul	4–3	América	Mexico City
21:15 CST	Lira 19', (yellow card) 60'; Paradela 35', (yellow card) 90+3'; Ibáñez (penalty missed) 43', (yellow card) 45+6'; Orozco 45', (yellow card) 45+6'; Márquez (yellow card) 63'; Fernández 72'	Report	Cervantes (yellow card) 45+6'; Veiga (yellow card) 45+6'; Rodríguez 52'; Perea 90'; M. Borja 90'	Stadium: Estadio Azteca; Attendance: 40,430; Referee: Luis Enrique Santander

19 September 2026 9	América	2–2	Guadalajara	Mexico City
21:15 CST	M. Borja 71', 74'; C. Borja (yellow card) 90'	Report	B. González 32'; Marín 45+2'; Aguirre (yellow card) 50'; Camberos (yellow card) 84'; F. González (yellow card) 90'	Stadium: Estadio Azteca; Attendance: 72,990; Referee: Víctor Cáceres Hernández

27 September 2026 10	Necaxa	2–4	América	Aguascalientes
21:00 CST	González 36'; Carranza 42'; Martínez (yellow card) 61'; Ochoa (yellow card) 87'; Ruiz (yellow card) 89'	Report	Sánchez (yellow card) 33'; Martín 38', 45+9', 74'; M. Borja 55'; C. Borja (yellow card) 90+3'	Stadium: Estadio Victoria; Attendance: 20,398; Referee: Guillermo Pacheco Larios

10 October 2026 11	América	1–1	Monterrey	Mexico City
21:00 CST	C. Borja (yellow card) 2'; Bueno 45+3'; M. Borja (red card) 86'	Report	Rossi 17'; Garza (yellow card) 60'	Stadium: Estadio Azteca; Referee: Óscar Mejía García

17 October 2026 12	León	v	América	León
19:00 CST		Report		Stadium: Estadio León

21 October 2026 13	Atlas	v	América	Guadalajara
19:00 CST		Report		Stadium: Estadio Jalisco

25 October 2026 14	América	v	Pachuca	Mexico City
17:00 CST		Report		Stadium: Estadio Azteca

28 October 2026 7	América	v	Tijuana	Mexico City
21:00 CST		Report		Stadium: Estadio Azteca
Note: The match was originally scheduled for 5 September 2026, but was postponed due to América's participation in the Leagues Cup.

31 October 2026 15	América	v	Toluca	Mexico City
21:90 CST		Report		Stadium: Estadio Azteca

7 November 2026 16	UNAM	v	América	Mexico City
21:00 CST		Report		Stadium: Estadio Olímpico Universitario

21 November 2026 17	UANL	v	América	San Nicolás de los Garza
21:00 CST		Report		Stadium: Estadio Universitario

=== Clausura 2027 ===
==== Results summary ====
Overall								Home						Away					
Pld	W	D	L	GF	GA	GD	Pts	W	D	L	GF	GA	GD	W	D	L	GF	GA	GD
0	0	0	0	0	0	0	0	0	0	0	0	0	0	0	0	0	0	0	0

Source: Liga MX

==== Results by round ====
Round	1	2	3	4	5	6	7	8	9	10	11	12	13	14	15	16	17
Ground																	
Result																	
Position																	
Points																	

Source: Liga MX
A = Away; H = Home; W = Win; D = Draw; L = Loss; P = Postponed

==== Regular phase ====
Win Draw Loss Fixtures

=== Leagues Cup ===
As a Liga MX side, América entered the Leagues Cup in the league phase.

==== League phase ====
Pos	Team	Pld	W	PW	PL	L	GF	GA	GD	Pts	Qualification
1	León	3	3	0	0	0	6	3	+3	9	Advance to knockout stage
2	América	3	2	0	1	0	7	3	+4	7	Advance to knockout stage
3	Toluca	3	2	0	0	1	6	2	+4	6	Advance to knockout stage
4	Monterrey	3	2	0	0	1	5	4	+1	6	Advance to knockout stage
5	Cruz Azul	3	2	0	0	1	4	3	+1	6	

Source: Leagues Cup

Round	1	2	3
Ground	H	N	N
Result	W	W	D
Position	2	1	2
Points	3	6	7

Source: Leagues Cup
A = Away; H = Home; W = Win; D = Draw; L = Loss

6 August 2026 1	América (Mexico)	3–1	(United States) San Diego FC	Mexico City, Mexico
20:00 CST	Rodríguez 11'; Sánchez 33'; Violante 45+2'	Report	McVey (yellow card) 30'; Bombino 63'; Tverskov (yellow card) 85'	Stadium: Estadio Azteca; Attendance: 39,993; Referee: Mario Escobar (Guatemala)

9 August 2026 2	América (Mexico)	3–1	(United States) Portland Timbers	Portland, United States
19:15 PDT	Rodríguez 6'; Juárez (yellow card) 30'; Violante 63'; Espinoza (yellow card) 70'; Vázquez (yellow card) 77'; Cervantes (yellow card) 79'; Perea 88'	Report	Velde 19', (yellow card) 90'; Chará (yellow card) 39'; Fory (yellow card) 59'; Bye (yellow card) 67'	Stadium: Providence Park; Attendance: 20,897; Referee: Walter López (Guatemala)

13 August 2026 3	América (Mexico)	1–1 (5–6 p)	(United States) Austin FC	Austin, United States
18:30 CDT	Cervantes (yellow card) 4'; Gallagher 48' (o.g.); E. Sánchez (yellow card) 61'	Report	E. Torres (yellow card) 52'; Uzuni 67'; Šabović (yellow card) 90+2'	Stadium: Q2 Stadium; Attendance: 11,281; Referee: Juan Gabriel Calderón (Costa Rica)
	Penalties
	Veiga (penalty scored); Reyes (penalty scored); Cervantes (penalty scored); Cácares (penalty scored); Álvarez (penalty scored); Borja (penalty missed)		Rosales (penalty scored); Šabović (penalty scored); Ramirez (penalty scored); Uzuni (penalty scored); Alastuey (penalty scored); I. Sánchez (penalty scored)

==== Knouckout stage ====
26 August 2026 Quarter-finals	América (Mexico)	2–0	(United States) Columbus Crew	Carson, United States
19:45 PDT	Veiga 11'; Rodríguez 45+5'; Perea (yellow card) 86'	Report	Méndez (penalty missed) 39'	Stadium: Dignity Health Sports Park; Attendance: 20,637; Referee: Marco Ortiz (Mexico)

2 September 2026 Semi-finals	América (Mexico)	2–2 (4–5 p)	(Mexico) Monterrey	Carson, United States
20:30 PDT	Juárez 57', (yellow card) 86'; Cervantes 63'	Report	Rossi 49'; Ocampos (yellow card) 56', (goal) 69' (pen.)	Stadium: Dignity Health Sports Park; Attendance: 21,276; Referee: Mario Escobar (Guatemala)
	Penalties
	Veiga (penalty scored); Rodríguez (penalty scored); Reyes (penalty scored); Cervantes (penalty missed); Sánchez (penalty scored)		(penalty scored) Orellano; (penalty scored) Rossi; (penalty scored) Guzmán; (penalty scored) Corona; (penalty scored) Cuypers

6 September 2026 3rd	León (Mexico)	1–0	(Mexico) América	Houston, United States
17:00 CDT	J. Rodríguez (yellow card) 31'; S. Reyes (yellow card) 56'; J. Guevarra (yellow card) 63'; Cambindo 80'	Report	Cervantes (yellow card) 25'; Borja (yellow card) 57'; Juárez (yellow card) 89'; B. Rodríguez (yellow card) 90+3'; Sánchez (yellow card) 90+6'	Stadium: Shell Energy Stadium; Attendance: 21,114; Referee: Oshane Nation (Jamaica)

== Statistics ==
=== Appearances and goals ===
No.	Pos	Nat	Player	Total		Apertura 2026		Clausura 2027		CONCACAF Champions Cup		Leagues Cup	
No.	Pos	Nat	Player	Apps	Goals	Apps	Goals	Apps	Goals	Apps	Goals	Apps	Goals
Goalkeepers
1	GK	(Mexico) MEX	Luis Malagón	0	0	0	0	0	0	0	0	0	0
21	GK	(Mexico) MEX	Fernando Tapia	3	0	2	0	0	0	0	0	1	0
30	GK	(Mexico) MEX	Rodolfo Cota	11	0	6	0	0	0	0	0	5	0
31	GK	(Mexico) MEX	César Lugo	0	0	0	0	0	0	0	0	0	0
Defenders
2	DF	(Mexico) MEX	Emilio Lara	3	0	3	0	0	0	0	0	0	0
3	DF	(Mexico) MEX	Israel Reyes	10	0	3+2	0	0	0	0	0	5	0
5	DF	(Mexico) MEX	Kevin Álvarez	11	0	4+1	0	0	0	0	0	5+1	0
14	DF	(Uruguay) URU	Santiago Bueno	0	0	0	0	0	0	0	0	0	0
15	DF	(Argentina) ARG	Santiago Ramos	0	0	0	0	0	0	0	0	0	0
24	DF	(Mexico) MEX	Franco Rossano	1	0	0+1	0	0	0	0	0	0	0
26	DF	(Colombia) COL	Cristian Borja	12	1	4+2	1	0	0	0	0	5+1	0
29	DF	(Mexico) MEX	Ramón Juárez	10	1	6+1	0	0	0	0	0	3	1
32	DF	(Mexico) MEX	Miguel Vázquez	7	0	5	0	0	0	0	0	2	0
Midfielders
6	MF	(United States) USA	Edwin Cerrillo	5	0	1+2	0	0	0	0	0	2	0
8	MF	(Spain) ESP	Carlos Álvarez	1	0	0+1	0	0	0	0	0	0	0
10	MF	(United States) USA	Alejandro Zendejas	2	0	1+1	0	0	0	0	0	0	0
12	MF	(Mexico) MEX	Isaías Violante	13	3	5+2	1	0	0	0	0	5+1	2
13	MF	(Mexico) MEX	Alan Cervantes	12	1	6	0	0	0	0	0	6	1
20	MF	(Mexico) MEX	Alexis Gutiérrez	6	0	2+3	0	0	0	0	0	0+1	0
22	MF	(Colombia) COL	Óscar Perea	10	3	2+3	2	0	0	0	0	1+4	1
23	MF	(Brazil) BRA	Raphael Veiga	14	2	7+1	1	0	0	0	0	4+2	1
27	MF	(Brazil) BRA	Ícaro	10	1	3+2	1	0	0	0	0	1+4	0
28	MF	(Mexico) MEX	Érick Sánchez	14	1	5+3	0	0	0	0	0	4+2	1
34	MF	(Mexico) MEX	Dagoberto Espinoza	12	0	8	0	0	0	0	0	2+2	0
35	MF	(Mexico) MEX	Santiago Naveda	0	0	0	0	0	0	0	0	0	0
186	MF	(Mexico) MEX	Diego Arriaga (Note: Player registered with the under-21 team)	7	1	2+2	1	0	0	0	0	0+3	0
Forwards
7	FW	(Uruguay) URU	Brian Rodríguez	12	6	3+3	3	0	0	0	0	6	3
9	FW	(Mexico) MEX	Henry Martín	12	3	7	3	0	0	0	0	3+2	0
11	FW	(Chile) CHI	Víctor Dávila	0	0	0	0	0	0	0	0	0	0
19	FW	(Colombia) COL	Raúl Zúñiga	0	0	0	0	0	0	0	0	0	0
93	FW	(Colombia) COL	Miguel Borja	2	3	0+2	3	0	0	0	0	0	0
189	FW	(Mexico) MEX	Alejandro Cárdenas	10	1	1+3	1	0	0	0	0	3+3	0
Players transferred out during the season
4	DF	(Uruguay) URU	Sebastián Cáceres	5	0	2	0	0	0	0	0	3	0
33	FW	(Mexico) MEX	Patricio Salas	3	0	0+2	0	0	0	0	0	0+1	0

Last updated: 19 September 2026
Source: Competitions

=== Assists ===
The list is sorted by squad number when total assists are equal.

Rank	Pos.	No.	Player	Apertura 2026	Clausura 2027	CONCACAF Champions Cup	Leagues Cup	Total
1.	MF	23	(Brazil) Raphael Veiga	2	0	0	3	5
2.	FW	7	(Uruguay) Brian Rodríguez	1	0	0	3	4
3.	DF	5	(Mexico) Kevin Álvarez	3	0	0	0	3
3.	FW	9	(Mexico) Henry Martín	2	0	0	0	2
5.	MF	34	(Mexico) Dagoberto Espinoza	2	0	0	0	2
6.	MF	12	(Mexico) Isaías Violante	1	0	0	0	1
6.	DF	26	(Colombia) Cristian Borja	0	0	0	1	1
6.	MF	28	(Mexico) Érick Sánchez	1	0	0	0	1
6.	DF	29	(Mexico) Ramón Juárez	1	0	0	0	1
Totals				13	0	0	7	20

Last updated: 19 September 2026.
Source: Competitions

=== Disciplinary record ===
The list is sorted by squad number when total cards are equal.

Rank	Pos.	No.	Player	Apertura 2026			Clausura 2027			CONCACAF Champions Cup			Leagues Cup			Total		
Rank	Pos.	No.	Player	Yellow card	(yellow card) (yellow-red card)	Red card	Yellow card	(yellow card) (yellow-red card)	Red card	Yellow card	(yellow card) (yellow-red card)	Red card	Yellow card	(yellow card) (yellow-red card)	Red card	Yellow card	(yellow card) (yellow-red card)	Red card
1.	MF	13	(Mexico) Alan Cervantes	1	1	0	0	0	0	0	0	0	3	0	0	4	1	0
2.	DF	29	(Mexico) Ramón Juárez	1	0	0	0	0	0	0	0	0	3	0	0	4	0	0
3.	MF	28	(Mexico) Érick Sánchez	1	0	0	0	0	0	0	0	0	2	0	0	3	0	0
4.	DF	5	(Mexico) Kevin Álvarez	2	0	0	0	0	0	0	0	0	0	0	0	2	0	0
4.	FW	9	(Mexico) Henry Martín	2	0	0	0	0	0	0	0	0	0	0	0	2	0	0
4.	MF	23	(Brazil) Raphael Veiga	2	0	0	0	0	0	0	0	0	0	0	0	2	0	0
4.	DF	26	(Colombia) Cristian Borja	1	0	0	0	0	0	0	0	0	1	0	0	2	0	0
8.	FW	7	(Uruguay) Brian Rodríguez	0	0	0	0	0	0	0	0	0	1	0	0	1	0	0
8.	MF	22	(Colombia) Óscar Perea	0	0	0	0	0	0	0	0	0	1	0	0	1	0	0
8.	MF	27	(Brazil) Ícaro	1	0	0	0	0	0	0	0	0	0	0	0	1	0	0
8.	DF	32	(Mexico) Miguel Vázquez	0	0	0	0	0	0	0	0	0	1	0	0	1	0	0
8.	MF	34	(Mexico) Dagoberto Espinoza	0	0	0	0	0	0	0	0	0	1	0	0	1	0	0
Totals				11	1	0	0	0	0	0	0	0	13	0	0	24	1	0

Last updated: 19 September 2026
Source: Competitions

=== Clean sheets ===
The list is sorted by squad number when total clean sheets are equal.

Rank	No.	Player	Apertura 2026	Clausura 2027	CONCACAF Champions Cup	Leagues Cup	Total
1.	30	(Mexico) Rodolfo Cota	2	0	0	1	3
2.	21	(Mexico) Fernando Tapia	2	0	0	0	2
Totals			4	0	0	1	5

Last updated: 29 August 2026.
Source: Competitions
