= 1990 Copa Interamericana =

- Event: Copa Interamericana
Club Olimpia	América
(Paraguay)	(Mexico)
2	3
- (América won 3–0 on points)

First leg
Club Olimpia	América
1	1
- Date: October 1, 1991
- Venue: Defensores del Chaco, Asunción
- Referee: Francisco Lamolina (Argentina)
- Attendance: 15,000

Second leg
América	Club Olimpia
2	1
- Date: October 12, 1991
- Venue: Estadio Azteca, Mexico City
- Referee: Ronald Gutiérrez (Costa Rica)
- Attendance: 60,000

The 1990 Copa Interamericana was the 13th. edition of the Copa Interamericana. The final was contested by Mexican Club América (winner of 1990 CONCACAF Champions' Cup) and Paraguayan Club Olimpia (champion of 1990 Copa Libertadores). The final was played under a two-leg format in October 1991.

The first leg was held in Estadio Defensores del Chaco in Asunción, where both teams tied 1–1. The second leg was played at Estadio Azteca in Mexico City, where América beat Olimpia 2–1 therefore winning their second Interamericana trophy. During the match, América manager Carlos Miloc ran to the field to beat Olimpia player Fermín Balbuena, causing other Olimpia players going for Miloc, beating him. For those incidents, the match was interrupted for 15 minutes.

As a result of the riot, América fired Miloc, while CONCACAF penalised him with one-year suspension.

== Qualified teams ==
Team	Qualification	Previous app.
(Mexico) América	1990 CONCACAF Champions' Cup winner	**1977**
(Paraguay) Olimpia	1990 Copa Libertadores winner	**1979**

Bold indicates winning years

== Venues ==
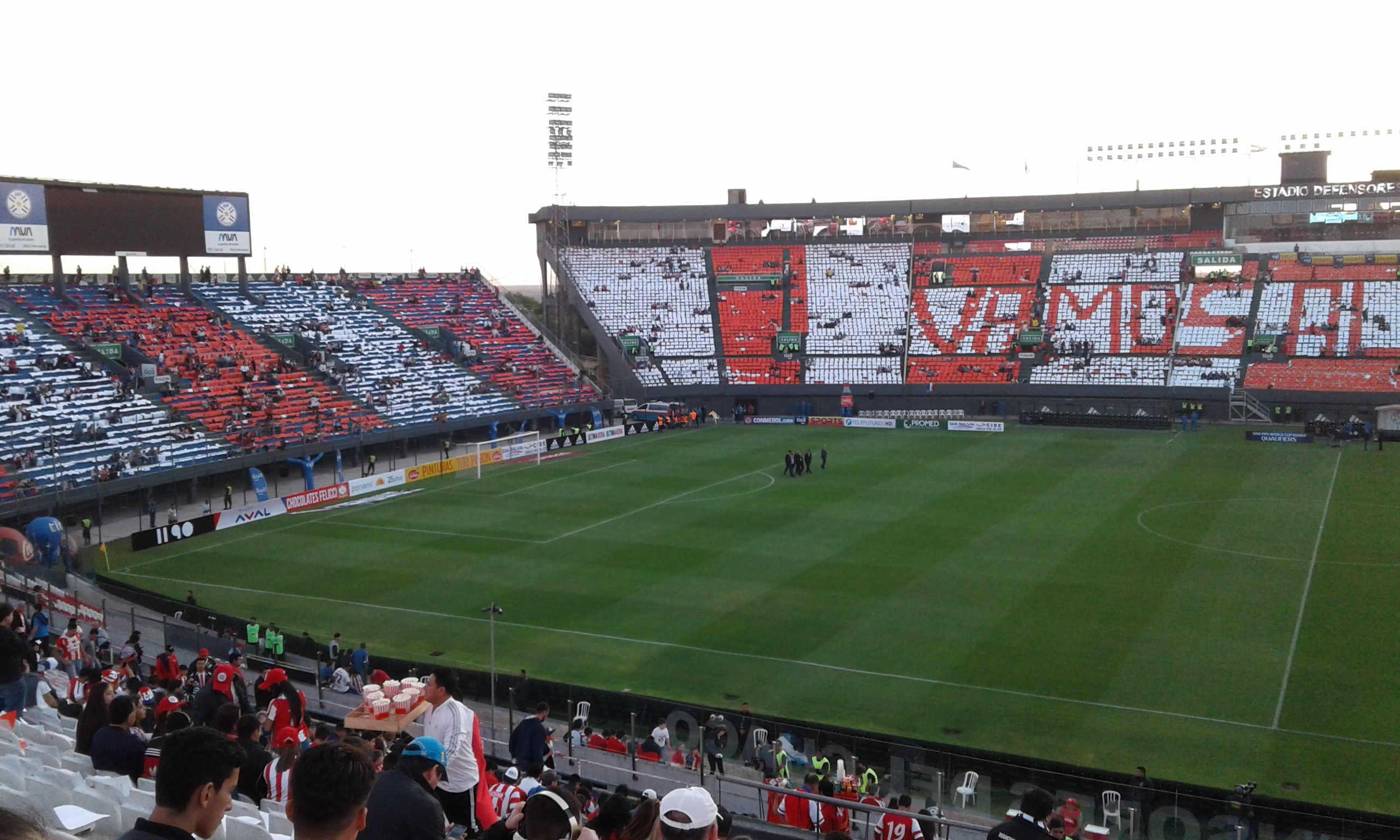
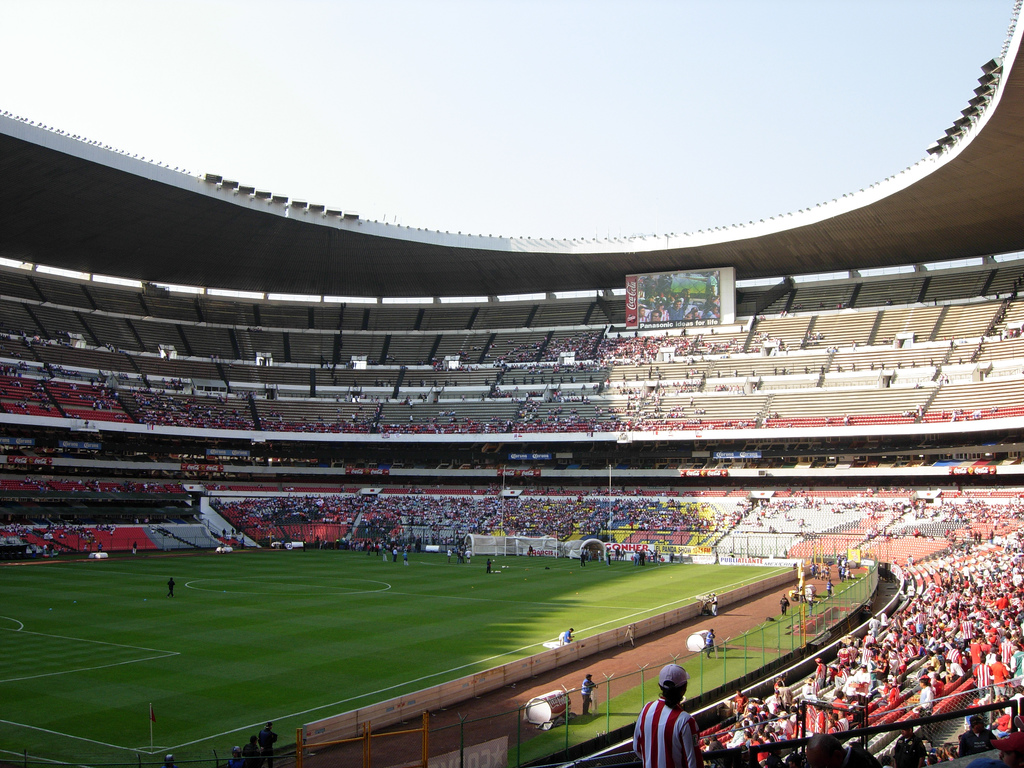
Defensores del Chaco (left) and Estadio Azteca, venues for the series

== Match details ==
=== First leg ===
1990 Copa Interamericana
October 1, 1991
First leg

Olimpia (Paraguay)	1–1	(Mexico) América
González 30'	Report	Edu 9'

Defensores del Chaco, Asunción
Attendance: 15,500
Referee: Francisco Lamolina (Argentina)

**Olimpia**	**América**

GK	**1**	(Paraguay) Jorge Battaglia
DF		(Paraguay) Virginio Cáceres
DF		(Paraguay) Mario Ramírez
DF	**5**	(Paraguay) Rogelio Delgado
DF		(Paraguay) Silvio Suárez
MF		(Paraguay) Fermín Balbuena
MF		(Paraguay) Jorge Guasch
MF		(Paraguay) Carlos Guirland
FW		(Paraguay) Jorge Gómez	(substituted off) a'
FW		(Paraguay) Carlos Torres	(substituted off) b'
FW	**11**	(Paraguay) Gabriel González
Substitutes:
MF		(Paraguay) Jorge L. Campos	(substituted off) a'
FW		(Paraguay) Felipe Franco	(substituted off) b'
Manager:
(Paraguay) Aníbal Ruiz

GK	**12**	(Mexico) Alejandro García
DF		(Mexico) Juan Hernández
DF		(Mexico) José E. Vaca
DF		(Mexico) José E. Rodón
DF	**6**	(Uruguay) Cesilio de los Santos
MF		(Mexico) Alejandro Domínguez
MF		(Mexico) Jesús E. Córdova
MF	**7**	(Mexico) Gonzalo Farfán
FW		(Brazil) Antônio Carlos Santos
FW	**10**	(Brazil) Edu Manga	(substituted off) a'
FW		(Mexico) Zague
Substitutes:
FW		(Mexico) Arturo Cañas	(substituted on) a'
Manager:
(Uruguay) Carlos Miloc

=== Second leg ===
October 12, 1991
Second leg

América (Mexico)	2–1	(Paraguay) Olimpia
Toninho 7', 41'	Report	González 20'

Estadio Azteca, Mexico City
Attendance: 60,000
Referee: Ronald Gutiérrez (Costa Rica)

**América**	**Olimpia**

GK	12	(Mexico) Alejandro García
DF	2	(Mexico) Juan Hernández
DF		(Mexico) Alejandro Dominguez
DF		(Mexico) José Rodón
DF	6	(Uruguay) Cesilio de los Santos	Sent off (straight red)
MF		(Mexico) Jesús E. Córdova	(substituted off) 26'
MF	7	(Mexico) Gonzalo Farfán	Booked
MF	13	(Brazil) Antônio Carlos Santos
FW	10	(Brazil) Edu Manga
FW	9	(Brazil) Toninho	(substituted off) 64'
FW	17	(Mexico) Zague
Substitutes:
DF		(Mexico) José E. Vaca	(substituted on) 26'
FW		(Mexico) Arturo Cañas	(substituted on) 64'
Manager:
(Uruguay) Carlos Miloc

GK	**1**	(Paraguay) Jorge Battaglia
DF		(Paraguay) Virginio Cáceres
DF		(Paraguay) Mario Ramírez
DF	**5**	(Paraguay) Rogelio Delgado	Sent off (straight red)
DF		(Paraguay) Silvio Suárez
MF		(Paraguay) Fermín Balbuena
MF		(Paraguay) Jorge Guasch
MF		(Paraguay) Adolfo Jara Heyn
MF		(Paraguay) Carlos Guirland	(substituted off) 55'
FW	**11**	(Paraguay) Gabriel González
FW		(Paraguay) Cristóbal Cubilla	(substituted off) 46'
Substitutes:
MF	**18**	(Paraguay) Romerito	(substituted on) 46' (yellow card)
DF		(Paraguay) César Castro	(substituted on) 55'
Manager:
(Paraguay) Aníbal Ruiz
