= Óscar Perea =

Colombian footballer (born 2005)

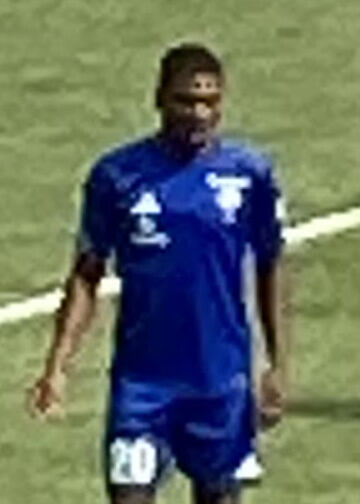
- Perea with Strasbourg in 2024

Personal information
- Full name: Óscar Andrés Perea Abonce
- Date of birth: 27 September 2005 (age 21)
- Place of birth: Pereira, Risaralda, Colombia
- Height: 1.78 m (5 ft 10 in)
- Position: Winger

Team information
- Current team: América
- Number: 22

Youth career
- Escuela Benkos Biojo
- Envigado Palmira
- 2018–2020: La Cantera
- 2020–2022: Atlético Nacional

Senior career*
Years	Team	Apps	(Gls)
2022–2024	Atlético Nacional	44	(6)
2024–2026	Strasbourg	2	(0)
2024–2026	Strasbourg II	8	(2)
2025–2026	→ AVS (loan)	25	(2)
2026–	América	7	(3)

International career^{‡}
2022	Colombia U17	2	(1)
2024	Colombia U23	5	(1)
2025	Colombia U20	16	(5)
2026–	Colombia	1	(0)
Medal record
Men's football
Representing Colombia
FIFA U-20 World Cup
Third place	2025 Chile
South American U-20 Championship
Third place	2025 Venezuela
- * Club domestic league appearances and goals as of 20 October 2026 ‡ National team caps and goals as of 13 November 2026

Óscar Andrés Perea Abonce (born 27 September 2005) is a Colombian professional footballer who plays as a winger for Liga MX side América and the Colombia national team.

== Early life ==
Perea's father, Óscar Antonio, was killed in a workplace accident when Perea was five months old. (Note: El Colombiano's account of Perea's childhood instead places his father's death when Perea was five years old, and gives his birthplace as La Virginia rather than Pereira; most other reporting, including the Spanish news agency EFE, gives Pereira as his birthplace.) He moved with his mother, Adriana, to Santa Cecilia, a corregimiento of Pueblo Rico, where he first started playing football at the Escuela Benkos Biojo. At the advice of his uncle, he entered the Envigado Palmira Football School in Palmira, but this was short-lived, and he soon returned to Pereira.

In 2018, aged 12, Perea trialled at Club La Cantera, where coach Jorge Iván Montoya was impressed enough to give him an immediate scholarship. He went on to help the club to the runner-up spot in the Liga de Risaralda and win two Telecafé titles, scoring more than 70 goals in two years; another of his coaches there, Daniel Bedoya, recalled him scoring 14 goals in a single tournament at the age of 13. His form earned him a call-up to a Risaralda representative side under coach Diego Pava. Those results drew interest from Atlético Nacional, where he had a successful trial, before being named by English newspaper The Guardian as one of the best players born in 2005 worldwide in September 2022.

== Club career ==
=== Atlético Nacional ===
Perea made his professional debut for Atlético Nacional on 15 May 2022, coming on for 10 minutes in a 1–0 home defeat to La Equidad. (Note: ClaroSports gives the debut date as 14 May 2022, but is otherwise consistent with Noticias Caracol's account of the scoreline and minutes played.) He scored his first senior goal almost exactly a year later, on 15 May 2023 against Alianza, and became a regular under coach Jhon Jairo Bódmer in the second half of that year; his involvement lessened after Bódmer's departure from the club.

Perea won three trophies with Atlético Nacional: the Categoría Primera A in the 2022 Torneo Apertura, and the Superliga Colombiana and Copa Colombia in 2023. He finished his spell at the club with 54 appearances, 8 goals and 4 assists across all competitions.

=== Strasbourg ===
On 2 July 2024, Perea joined Ligue 1 club Strasbourg for €5.2 million. He struggled for first-team opportunities over the following two seasons, making only two Ligue 1 appearances and totalling around 12 minutes of first-team football, while featuring more regularly for the reserve side, Strasbourg II, in the Championnat National 3.

On 1 September 2025, Perea was loaned out to Primeira Liga club AVS until the end of the season. He made his first starts of the loan against Estoril Praia and Benfica early in the season, and went on to make 26 appearances in all competitions for AVS, scoring twice and providing one assist.

=== América ===
On 28 July 2026, Perea joined América in Mexico on a season-long loan with an option to buy. (Note: RC Strasbourg's own statement described the move as a permanent transfer, but Colombian and Mexican outlets, citing EFE and other reporting, described it as a loan with an option to make the transfer permanent.) He made his debut on 9 August 2026, coming on as an 81st-minute substitute away to Portland Timbers in the group stage of the 2026 Leagues Cup, and scored América's third goal in a 3–1 win seven minutes later.

== International career ==
=== Youth ===
Perea was called up to Colombia's under-17 squad in 2022.

=== Under-23 ===
Perea was named in Colombia's squad, coached by Héctor Cárdenas, for the 2024 South American Pre-Olympic Tournament in Venezuela, held from 20 January to 11 February 2024 to decide South American qualification for the 2024 Paris Olympics.

=== Under-20 ===
Perea was part of the Colombia squad that finished third at the 2025 South American U-20 Championship in Venezuela.

At the 2025 FIFA U-20 World Cup in Chile, Perea scored the only goal in Colombia's 1–0 win over Saudi Arabia in the opening match, finishing off a move started by a Jordan Barrera press and assist in the 64th minute. Colombia went on to draw 0–0 with Norway and 1–1 with Nigeria to top Group F, then beat South Africa 3–1 in the round of 16 and Spain 3–2 in the quarter-finals, before losing 1–0 to Argentina in the semi-finals. In the third-place match against France on 18 October, Perea scored after two minutes, following a Royner Benítez pass, as Colombia won 1–0 to secure their second bronze medal in the competition's history after 2003. He finished the tournament with two goals and one assist in seven appearances.

=== Senior ===
Perea made his debut for the Colombia national team on 13 November 2026 in a friendly against Chile.

== Career statistics ==
As of match played on 12 September 2026

Appearances and goals by club, season and competition
Club	Season	League			National cup (Note: Includes Copa Colombia)		Continental		Other		Total	
Club	Season	Division	Apps	Goals	Apps	Goals	Apps	Goals	Apps	Goals	Apps	Goals
Atlético Nacional	2022	Categoría Primera A	1	0	0	0	0	0	—		1	0
Atlético Nacional	2023	Categoría Primera A	35	5	6	2	3	0	—		44	7
Atlético Nacional	2024	Categoría Primera A	8	1	0	0	0	0	—		8	1
Atlético Nacional	Total		44	6	6	2	3	0	0	0	53	8
Strasbourg	2024–25	Ligue 1	2	0	0	0	—		—		2	0
Strasbourg II	2024–25	National 3	8	2	—		—		—		8	2
AVS (loan)	2025–26	Primeira Liga	25	2	1	0	—		—		26	2
América (loan)	2026–27	Liga MX	4	2	—		—		2 (Note: Appearances in Leagues Cup)	1	6	3
Career total			83	12	7	2	3	0	2	1	95	15

== Honours ==
Atlético Nacional

- Categoría Primera A: 2022
- Superliga Colombiana: 2023
- Copa Colombia: 2023

Colombia U20

- FIFA U-20 World Cup third place: 2025
- South American U-20 Championship third place: 2025
