= Alejandro Cárdenas (footballer) =

Mexican footballer (born 2006)

Personal information
- Full name: Alejandro Cárdenas Alonso
- Date of birth: 28 July 2006 (age 20)
- Place of birth: Mérida, Yucatán, Mexico
- Height: 1.89 m (6 ft 2 in)
- Position: Forward

Team information
- Current team: América
- Number: 189

Youth career
- 2019–2020: Venados
- 2021–: América

Senior career*
Years	Team	Apps	(Gls)
2026–	América	6	(1)
- * Club domestic league appearances and goals as of 25 October 2026

Alejandro Cárdenas Alonso (born 28 July 2006), commonly known as Coco Cárdenas, is a Mexican professional footballer who plays as a forward for Liga MX club América.

== Club career ==
Born in Mérida, Cárdenas was an academy player for his local club, Venados, before leaving to join the academy of América in 2021. Cárdenas was assigned in the under-16 category, before being quickly promoted to the under-18's and eventually playing for the under-23's prior to his debut.

On July 18 2026, in América's opening game of the 2026–27 season, Cárdenas made his debut for the club, coming off the bench in stoppage-time in a 1–0 away win over Querétaro. On 2 August, Cárdenas scored his first goal for the club, the third and final goal in a 3–0 win over Santos Laguna.

== Style of play ==
Cárdenas is a tall center-forward who, according to Mexican newspaper Récord, is known for his aerial ability, finishing, and movement in the penalty area. Cárdenas has been compared to fellow Mexican and current América captain Henry Martín. Both players originate from the city of Mérida and play in the same position, while also sharing similarities in their physical profile.

== Career statistics ==
=== Club ===
As of match played on 25 October 2026

Appearances and goals by club, season and competition
Club	Season	League			Cup		Continental		Other		Total	
Club	Season	Division	Apps	Goals	Apps	Goals	Apps	Goals	Apps	Goals	Apps	Goals
América	2026–27	Liga MX	6	1	—		—		6 (Note: Appearances in Leagues Cup)	0	12	1
Total			6	1	0	0	0	0	6	0	12	1
