= Eduardo González Pálmer =

Mexican footballer (1934–2022)

Personal information
- Date of birth: 23 August 1934
- Place of birth: Maravatío, Michoacán, Mexico
- Date of death: 21 February 2022 (aged 87)
- Position: Forward

Senior career*
Years	Team	Apps	(Gls)
1951–1963	Club América		

International career
1961	Mexico	4	(3)
- * Club domestic league appearances and goals

Eduardo González Pálmer (23 August 1934 – 21 February 2022) was a Mexican footballer who played as a forward. He played the entirety of his career with Club América, leading the Primera División de México in 1959 with 25 goals.

In 1961, he appeared in four games for the Mexico national team, scoring a total of three goals.

González Pálmer died on 21 February 2022, at the age of 87.
