= Emilio Lara (footballer) =

Mexican footballer (born 2002)

Personal information
- Full name: Emilio Lara Contreras
- Date of birth: 18 May 2002 (age 24)
- Place of birth: Atizapán, Mexico
- Height: 1.87 m (6 ft 2 in)
- Position: Defender

Team information
- Current team: América
- Number: 2

Youth career
- 2017–2021: América

Senior career*
| Years | Team | Apps | (Gls) |
| 2021– | América | 46 | (2) |
| 2024–2026 | → Necaxa (loan) | 44 | (0) |

International career^{‡}
| 2019 | Mexico U17 | 7 | (0) |
| 2021 | Mexico U21 | 2 | (0) |
| 2023 | Mexico U23 | 6 | (0) |
| 2022– | Mexico | 2 | (0) |
Medal record
Men's football
Representing Mexico
FIFA U-17 World Cup
| Runner-up | 2019 Brazil | Team |
Pan American Games
| Bronze medal – third place | 2023 Santiago | Team |
CONCACAF U-17 Championship
| Winner | 2019 United States |
- * Club domestic league appearances and goals as of 21 November 2026 ‡ National team caps and goals as of 7 June 2025

Emilio Lara Contreras (born 18 May 2002) is a Mexican professional footballer who plays as a defender for Liga MX club América and also plays for the Mexico national team.

== Club career ==
=== Club América ===
Lara made his Liga MX debut on 6 November 2021, in a match that ended as a 0–0 tie against Monterrey.

== International career ==
=== Youth ===
Lara was part of the under-17 side that participated at the 2019 CONCACAF U-17 Championship, where Mexico won the competition. He also participated at the 2019 U-17 World Cup, where Mexico finished runner-up.

=== Senior ===
Lara was called up to the senior national team by Gerardo Martino on 6 December 2021.

== Career statistics ==
=== Club ===
As of match played on 21 November 2026

| Club | Season | League | | | Cup | | Continental (Note: Includes CONCACAF Champions League/Cup) | | Other | | Total | |
| Club | Season | Division | Apps | Goals | Apps | Goals | Apps | Goals | Apps | Goals | Apps | Goals |
|---|---|---|---|---|---|---|---|---|---|---|---|---|
| América | 2021–22 | Liga MX | 2 | 0 | — | | — | | — | | 2 | 0 |
| América | 2022–23 | Liga MX | 29 | 2 | — | | — | | 2 (Note: Appearance in Leagues Cup) | 0 | 31 | 2 |
| América | 2023–24 | Liga MX | 8 | 0 | — | | 1 | 0 | 1 | 0 | 10 | 0 |
| América | 2024–25 | Liga MX | 1 | 0 | 1 (Note: Appearance in the 2024 Supercopa de la Liga MX) | 0 | — | | — | | 2 | 0 |
| América | 2026–27 | Liga MX | 6 | 0 | — | | — | | — | | 6 | 0 |
| América | Total | | 46 | 2 | 1 | 0 | 1 | 0 | 3 | 0 | 51 | 2 |
| Necaxa (loan) | 2024–25 | Liga MX | 26 | 0 | — | | — | | — | | 26 | 0 |
| Necaxa (loan) | 2025–26 | Liga MX | 18 | 0 | — | | — | | — | | 18 | 0 |
| Necaxa (loan) | Total | | 44 | 0 | — | | — | | — | | 44 | 0 |
| Career total | | | 90 | 2 | 1 | 0 | 1 | 0 | 3 | 0 | 95 | 2 |

=== International ===
As of match played on 7 June 2025

| National team | Year | Apps | Goals |
|---|---|---|---|
| Mexico | 2022 | 1 | 0 |
| Mexico | 2025 | 1 | 0 |
| Total | | 2 | 0 |

== Honours ==
América

- Liga MX: Apertura 2023, Clausura 2024, Apertura 2024
- Campeón de Campeones: 2024
- Supercopa de la Liga MX: 2024

Mexico U17

- CONCACAF U-17 Championship: 2019
- FIFA U-17 World Cup runner-up: 2019

Mexico U23

- Pan American Bronze Medal: 2023

Individual

- Liga MX Best Rookie: 2022–23
