= Alan Cervantes =

Mexican footballer (born 1998)

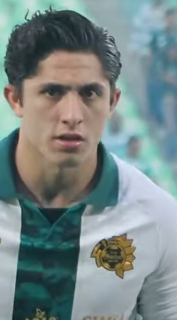
- Cervantes with Santos Laguna in 2023

Personal information
- Full name: Alan Josué Cervantes Martín del Campo
- Date of birth: 17 January 1998 (age 28)
- Place of birth: Guadalajara, Jalisco, Mexico
- Height: 1.75 m (5 ft 9 in)
- Position: Defensive midfielder

Team information
- Current team: América
- Number: 13

Youth career
- 2013–2017: Guadalajara

Senior career*
Years	Team	Apps	(Gls)
2017–2020	Guadalajara	24	(1)
2017	→ León (loan)	8	(0)
2020–2024	Santos Laguna	149	(1)
2024–	América	64	(2)

International career^{‡}
2015–2016	Mexico U17	7	(0)
2017–2018	Mexico U20	10	(0)
2018	Mexico U21	8	(0)
2021	Mexico U23	7	(0)
2021–2023	Mexico	5	(0)
Medal record
Men's football
Representing Mexico
CONCACAF Gold Cup
Runner-up	2021 United States	Team
Olympic Qualifying Championship
Winner	2020 Mexico
Toulon Tournament
Runner-up	2018 France	Team
CONCACAF Under-17 Championship
First place	2015 Honduras	Team
- * Club domestic league appearances and goals as of 21 November 2026 ‡ National team caps and goals as of 7 June 2023

Alan Josué Cervantes Martín del Campo (born 17 January 1998) is a Mexican professional footballer who plays as a defensive midfielder for Liga MX club América.

== Club career ==
=== Guadalajara ===
Cervantes joined Guadalajara's youth academy in 2013. He continued through Chivas Youth Academy successfully going through U-15, U-17 and U-20 youth system. Until being given the chance to join first division team León making his professional debut under Javier Torrente.

==== León (loan) ====
Cervantes joined Leon on a one-year loan without purchase option. He made his professional debut coming in as a substitute against Atlas on 22 July 2017 ending in a 3–0 loss

=== Club América ===
On 14 July 2024, Cervantes joined América.

== International career ==
=== Youth ===
Cervantes captained all of the national team's matches in the 2017 FIFA U-20 World Cup in South Korea.

Cervantes was included in the under-21 roster that participated in the 2018 Toulon Tournament, where Mexico would finish runners-up.

Cervantes participated at the 2020 CONCACAF Olympic Qualifying Championship, appearing in four matches, where Mexico won the competition.

=== Senior ===
On 3 July 2021, Cervantes made his senior national team debut in a 4–0 victory against Nigeria, coming in as a substitute in the 81st minute for Érick Gutiérrez.

== Career statistics ==
=== Club ===
As of match played on 21 November 2026

Club	Season	League			Cup		Continental		Global		Other		Total	
Club	Season	Division	Apps	Goals	Apps	Goals	Apps	Goals	Apps	Goals	Apps	Goals	Apps	Goals
Guadalajara	2017–18	Liga MX	2	0	—		1 (Note: Appearances in CONCACAF Champions League)	0	—		—		3	0
Guadalajara	2018–19	Liga MX	9	1	4	0	—		1 (Note: Appearance in the FIFA Club World Cup)	0	—		14	1
Guadalajara	2019–20	Liga MX	13	0	3	0	—		—		—		16	0
Guadalajara	Total		24	1	7	0	1	0	1	0	—		33	1
León (loan)	2017–18	Liga MX	8	0	4	0	—		—		—		12	0
Santos Laguna	2019–20	Liga MX	3	0	4	0	—		—		—		7	0
Santos Laguna	2020–21	Liga MX	41	0	—		—		—		1 (Note: Appearances in Leagues Cup)	0	42	0
Santos Laguna	2021–22	Liga MX	32	0	—		2	0	—		—		34	0
Santos Laguna	2022–23	Liga MX	36	0	3 (Note: Appearances in Copa Sky por México)	0	—		—		—		39	0
Santos Laguna	2023–24	Liga MX	36	1	—		—		—		2	0	38	1
Santos Laguna	2024–25	Liga MX	1	0	—		—		—		—		1	0
Santos Laguna	Total		149	1	7	0	2	0	—		3	0	158	1
América	2024–25	Liga MX	33	1	—		2	0	—		2	0	37	1
América	2025–26	Liga MX	19	1	1 (Note: One appearance in Campeón de Campeones)	0	2	0	1 (Note: Appearance in the FIFA Club World Cup play-in)	0	1	0	24	1
América	2026–27	Liga MX	12	0	—		—		—		6	1	18	1
América	Total		64	2	1	0	4	0	1	0	9	1	79	3
Career total			245	4	19	0	7	0	2	0	12	1	285	5

=== International ===
National team	Year	Apps	Goals
Mexico	2021	4	0
Mexico	2022	0	0
Mexico	2023	1	0
Total		5	0

== Honours ==
Guadalajara

- CONCACAF Champions League: 2018

América

- Liga MX: Apertura 2024
- Campeones Cup: 2024

Mexico Youth

- CONCACAF U-17 Championship: 2015
- CONCACAF Olympic Qualifying Championship: 2020
