= InterLiga 2008 Final =

After both finals have been played, both winners qualify to the Copa Libertadores. Of the two winners, the team with the highest points during the group stages will be dubbed "Mexico 2"

== Final 1 ==
All times EST

2008-01-12
21:00

San Luis (Mexico)	0 – 3	(Mexico) Atlas
	(Report)	Marioni 16'; Achucarro 53' 74'

Home Depot Center, Carson, California
Attendance: 27,000
Referee: Baldomero Toledo (United States)

San Luis	Atlas

SAN LUIS:
GK	1	(Mexico) Adrián Martínez
DF	4	(Mexico) Oscar Mascorro
DF	16	(United States) Michael Orozco
DF	2	(Mexico) Omar Monjaraz		(substituted off) 46'
DF	14	(Mexico) Mario Pérez Zúñiga
MF	6	(Mexico) Israel Martínez
MF	8	(Argentina) Eduardo Coudet (c)		(substituted off) 89'
MF	7	(Mexico) Octavio Valdez
MF	11	(Mexico) Braulio Luna
FW	10	(Colombia) Tressor Moreno	(yellow card) 61'	(substituted off) 65'
FW	9	(Argentina) Alfredo Moreno	(yellow card) 58'
Substitutes:
MF	13	(Mexico) Luis Ignacio González		(substituted on) 46'
FW	23	(Uruguay) Marcelo Guerrero		(substituted on) 65'
MF	17	(Mexico) Ignacio Torres		(substituted on) 89'
Manager:
(Mexico) Raúl Arias				(red card) 75'

ATLAS:
GK	1	(Mexico) Mario Rodríguez
DF	2	(Mexico) Omar Flores Serrano	(yellow card) 30'
DF	16	(Mexico) Hugo Ayala		(substituted off) 55'
DF	3	(Argentina) Diego Colotto
DF	15	(Mexico) Gerardo Flores Zúñiga
MF	23	(Mexico) Eduardo Rergis
MF	26	(Mexico) Christian Valdez
MF	27	(Mexico) Jorge Hernández
MF	8	(Mexico) Juan Carlos Medina
FW	7	(Paraguay) Jorge Achucarro		(substituted off) 82'
FW	9	(Argentina) Bruno Marioni (c)		(substituted off) 89'
Substitutes:
DF	30	(Mexico) Jorge Torres Nilo	(yellow card) 59'	(substituted on) 55'
MF	11	(Mexico) Gregorio Torres		(substituted on) 82'
FW	20	(Mexico) Ulises Mendivil		(substituted on) 89'
Manager:
(Argentina) Miguel Ángel Brindisi

Assistant referees:
(United States) Fabio Tovar
(United States) George Gansner
Fourth official:
(United States) Ramón Hernández

== Final 2 ==
All times EST

2008-01-12
23:30

América (Mexico)	3 – 3	(Mexico) Cruz Azul
Cabañas 8' 43' (pen.); López 117'	(Report)	Villaluz 3'; Lozano 71'; Lugo 103'
Penalties
Cabañas (penalty scored); López (penalty scored); J.J. Mosqueda (penalty scored); Rojas (penalty scored); Villa (penalty scored)	5 – 3	(penalty scored) Andrade; (penalty scored) Vigneri; (penalty missed) Riveros; (penalty scored) Villaluz

Home Depot Center, Carson, California
Attendance: 27,000
Referee: Kevin Stott (United States)

América	Cruz Azul

AMÉRICA:
GK	1	(Mexico) Guillermo Ochoa
DF	3	(Mexico) José Antonio Castro
DF	16	(Mexico) Rodrigo Íñigo
DF	2	(Mexico) Ismael de Jesús Rodríguez	(yellow card) 6'
DF	4	(Mexico) Óscar Rojas	(yellow card) 36'
MF	18	(Mexico) Germán Villa (c)	(yellow card) 54'
MF	26	(Mexico) Juan Carlos Silva
MF	13	(Mexico) Juan Carlos Mosqueda
MF	11	(Uruguay) Richard Núñez	(yellow card) 71'	(substituted off) 84'
FW	21	(Mexico) Enrique Esqueda	(yellow card) 39'	(substituted off) 79'
FW	9	(Paraguay) Salvador Cabañas
Substitutes:
FW	17	(Uruguay) Hernán Rodrigo López		(substituted on) 79'
MF	25	(Mexico) José de Jesús Mosqueda		(substituted on) 84'
Manager:
(Argentina) Daniel Brailovski

CRUZ AZUL:
GK	1	(Mexico) Oscar Pérez (c)
DF	8	(Paraguay) Carlos Bonet
DF	21	(Paraguay) Denis Caniza		(substituted off) 85'
DF	14	(Mexico) Joaquín Beltrán		(substituted off) 65'
DF	4	(Mexico) Julio Domínguez
MF	13	(Mexico) Jaime Lozano		(substituted off) 98'
MF	6	(Mexico) Gerardo Torrado	(yellow card) 2'
MF	7	(Paraguay) Christian Riveros	(yellow card) 42'
MF	10	(Mexico) Edgar Andrade
FW	18	(Mexico) César Villaluz
FW	15	(Uruguay) Nicolás Vigneri
Substitutes:
MF	23	(Mexico) Edgar Gerardo Lugo		(substituted on) 65'
DF	3	(Mexico) Joel Huiqui		(substituted on) 85'
DF	16	(Mexico) Rogelio Chávez		(substituted on) 98'
Manager:
(Uruguay) Sergio Markarián				(red card) 81'

Assistant referees:
(United States) Gregory Barkey
(United States) Corey Rockwell
Fourth official:
(United States) Jair Marrufo
