= Santa Cecilia, Risaralda =

Santa Cecilia
- Location in Risaralda and Colombia Santa Cecilia (Colombia)
- Coordinates: 5°20′0.0″N 76°8′0.0″W
- Country: Colombia
- Department: Risaralda
- Municipality: Pueblo Rico Municipality
- Elevation: 1,210 ft (370 m)

Population (2005)
  - Total: 355
- Time zone: UTC-5 (Colombia Standard Time)

Santa Cecilia is a settlement in Pueblo Rico Municipality, Risaralda Department in Colombia.

== Climate ==
Santa Cecilia has a very wet tropical rainforest climate (Af). It is the wettest place in the department of Risaralda.

Climate data for Santa Cecilia
Month	Jan	Feb	Mar	Apr	May	Jun	Jul	Aug	Sep	Oct	Nov	Dec	Year
Mean daily maximum °C (°F)	30.8 (87.4)	31.3 (88.3)	31.3 (88.3)	30.8 (87.4)	30.5 (86.9)	30.5 (86.9)	31.0 (87.8)	31.0 (87.8)	30.7 (87.3)	30.2 (86.4)	30.0 (86.0)	30.3 (86.5)	30.7 (87.2)
Daily mean °C (°F)	25.3 (77.5)	25.6 (78.1)	25.7 (78.3)	25.5 (77.9)	25.5 (77.9)	25.3 (77.5)	25.4 (77.7)	25.4 (77.7)	25.4 (77.7)	25.0 (77.0)	24.9 (76.8)	25.1 (77.2)	25.3 (77.6)
Mean daily minimum °C (°F)	19.9 (67.8)	19.9 (67.8)	20.2 (68.4)	20.3 (68.5)	20.5 (68.9)	20.1 (68.2)	19.8 (67.6)	19.9 (67.8)	20.1 (68.2)	19.8 (67.6)	19.9 (67.8)	19.9 (67.8)	20.0 (68.0)
Average rainfall mm (inches)	473.2 (18.63)	380.4 (14.98)	401.3 (15.80)	539.2 (21.23)	493.3 (19.42)	428.3 (16.86)	418.0 (16.46)	456.8 (17.98)	562.2 (22.13)	836.3 (32.93)	802.7 (31.60)	665.4 (26.20)	6,457.1 (254.22)
Average rainy days	18	14	18	22	23	20	19	21	21	25	23	21	245
Source 1:
Source 2:
