= Isaías Violante =

Mexican footballer (born 2003)

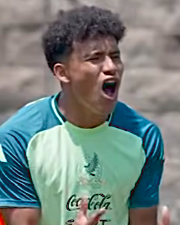
- Violante in 2025

Personal information
- Full name: Isaías Violante Romero
- Date of birth: 20 October 2003 (age 23)
- Place of birth: Veracruz, Mexico
- Height: 1.73 m (5 ft 8 in)
- Position: Winger

Team information
- Current team: América
- Number: 12

Youth career
- Toluca

Senior career*
Years	Team	Apps	(Gls)
2020–2025	Toluca	65	(7)
2025–	América	38	(3)

International career^{‡}
2019	Mexico U16	1	(0)
2021	Mexico U19	2	(0)
2021–2022	Mexico U20	9	(1)
2023–	Mexico U23	7	(0)
2026–	Mexico	5	(0)
Medal record
Men's football
Representing Mexico
Toulon Tournament
Second place	2023 France	Team
Central American and Caribbean Games
Gold medal – first place	2023 San Salvador	Team
- * Club domestic league appearances and goals as of 21 November 2026 ‡ National team caps and goals as of 6 October 2026

Isaías Violante Romero (born 20 October 2003) is a Mexican professional footballer who plays as a winger for Liga MX club América and the Mexico national team.

== Club career ==
Violante began his career at Toluca, making his professional debut in October 2020 in a league match against UNAM.

On 4 July 2025, Violante joined América.

== International career ==
Violante was part of the under-20 squad that competed at the 2021 Revelations Cup, where Mexico won the competition. In June 2022, he was named into the final 20-man roster for the CONCACAF Under-20 Championship, in which Mexico failed to qualify for the FIFA U-20 World Cup and Olympics.

== Career statistics ==
=== Club ===
As of match played on 21 November 2026

Club	Season	League			Cup		Continental		Other		Total	
Club	Season	Division	Apps	Goals	Apps	Goals	Apps	Goals	Apps	Goals	Apps	Goals
Toluca	2020–21	Liga MX	5	0	—		—		—		5	0
Toluca	2021–22	Liga MX	7	1	—		—		—		7	1
Toluca	2022–23	Liga MX	12	0	—		—		—		12	0
Toluca	2023–24	Liga MX	10	0	—		—		—		10	0
Toluca	2024–25	Liga MX	31	6	—		—		—		31	6
Toluca	Total		65	7	—		—		—		65	7
América	2025–26	Liga MX	24	2	1 (Note: Appearances in Campeón de Campeones)	0	3 (Note: Appearances in CONCACAF Champions Cup)	0	3 (Note: Appearances in Leagues Cup)	0	31	2
América	2026–27	Liga MX	14	1	—		—		6	2	20	3
América	Total		38	3	1	0	3	0	9	2	51	5
Career total			103	10	1	0	3	0	9	2	116	12

=== International ===
As of match played on 6 October 2026

Appearances and goals by national team and year
National team	Year	Apps	Goals
Mexico	2026	5	0
Total		5	0

== Honours ==
Toluca

- Liga MX: Clausura 2025

Mexico Youth

- Revelations Cup: 2021, 2022
- Central American and Caribbean Games: 2023
