= Ícaro da Conceição =

Brazilian footballer (born 2007)

Ícaro
Personal information
- Full name: Ícaro da Conceição
- Date of birth: 23 May 2007 (age 19)
- Place of birth: Sergipe, Brazil
- Height: 1.70 m (5 ft 7 in)
- Position: Midfielder

Team information
- Current team: América
- Number: 217

Youth career
- 2023–2025: Sfera Futebol Clube
- 2025–2026: América

Senior career*
Years	Team	Apps	(Gls)
2026–	América	6	(1)
- * Club domestic league appearances and goals as of 27 September 2026

Ícaro Geovane da Conceição Nascimento (born 23 May 2007), also known as Ícaro, is a Brazilian professional footballer who plays as a midfielder for Liga MX club América.

== Club career ==
Born in Sergipe, Brazil, Ícaro signed with América in the summer of 2025 at the age of 18, to be in the club's youth teams.

Ícaro made his league debut in the Apertura 2026 season being one of the youngsters for the squad that received the confidence of Guillermo Almada to be registered with the first team. On 29 August 2026, Ícaro scored his first goal as a professional in the Apertura 2026 Liga MX match against Club Puebla.

On 10 September 2026, Ícaro was removed from América’s first-team roster to make room for the other foreign players who were registered in the squad. This situation does not mean he is leaving América, instead he was registered again with the U-21 team to continue his development. América confirmed that Ícaro, who is already registered with the U-21 squad, will play using a unique carnet that allows him to participate in both that category and the first team.
