= César Lugo =

Mexican footballer (born 2003)

Personal information
- Full name: César Nazareth Lugo Aceves
- Date of birth: 15 May 2003 (age 23)
- Place of birth: Guadalajara, Jalisco, Mexico
- Height: 1.82 m (6 ft 0 in)
- Position: Goalkeeper

Team information
- Current team: América
- Number: 31

Youth career
- 2021–2022: Atlas
- 2022–2026: América

Senior career*
Years	Team	Apps	(Gls)
2026–	América	0	(0)
- * Club domestic league appearances and goals as of 10 May 2026

César Nazareth Lugo Aceves (born 15 May 2003) is a Mexican professional footballer who plays as a goalkeeper for Liga MX club América.

== Club career ==
Born in Guadalajara, Jalisco, Lugo was registered with América first team for the Apertura 2026 season at the request of newly arrived coach Guillermo Almada who is known to give opportunities to youngsters.
