= Carlos Miloc =

Uruguayan-Mexican football coach and player

Carlos Miloc Pelachi (February 9, 1932 – February 25, 2017) was a Uruguayan-Mexican football coach and former player who managed UANL Tigres, Club América, and the Guatemala national team, among other teams.

== Playing career ==
Miloc played professionally in Uruguay for Nacional de Montevideo from 1950 to 1954. From there he moved to Colombia, where he played two years, and in 1956 he arrived to Mexico, where he played for Morelia, Irapuato, and León.

== Managerial career ==
As the coach of Tigres, he was champion two times, in 1978, and 1982, and until 2009. He is also the only coach never to have lost a Clásico Regiomontano. He was also the league runner-up with América, and in 1991, he won the Nonoon Cup and the Copa Interamericana with that team.

In Guatemala he had several different tenures as the head coach of CSD Comunicaciones, whom he led to league titles in the 1996–97, 1998–99, and 1999 Apertura seasons. After his success with Comunicaciones he was appointed Guatemala's national coach, managing the team at the 2000 CONCACAF Gold Cup and in three matches during the 2002 World Cup qualification campaign.

As of 2009, he resided in San Nicolás de los Garza and was an editorialist for Grupo Reforma until his death on Saturday, February 25, 2017.
