= Cesilio de los Santos =

Uruguayan footballer

Personal information
- Full name: Cesilio de los Santos dos Santos
- Date of birth: 12 February 1965 (age 61)
- Place of birth: Rivera, Uruguay
- Position: Defender

Senior career*
Years	Team	Apps	(Gls)
1983	Frontera Rivera		
1984–1988	Bella Vista		
1988–1994	América	189	(8)
1994–1995	Tigres UANL	21	(0)
1995–1996	Puebla	2	(0)
1996–1997	Nacional		

International career
1991–1993	Uruguay	9	(0)
- * Club domestic league appearances and goals

Cesilio de los Santos dos Santos (born 12 February 1965) is a Uruguayan former professional footballer who played as a defender.

De los Santos has been capped for Uruguay. He made his debut in a friendly match against Mexico (1–1 draw) on November 20, 1991 in Veracruz.

== Honours ==
América

- Primera División: 1988–89
- Campeón de Campeones: 1989
- CONCACAF Champions' Cup: 1990, 1992
- Copa Interamericana: 1990
