= Club América =

Association football club in Mexico City

América
- Full name: Club de Fútbol América S.A. de C.V.
- Nicknames: Águilas (Eagles); Azulcremas (Blue-and-Creams); Millonetas (Millionaires)
- Short name: Ame
- Founded: 12 October 1916; 110 years ago
- Ground: Estadio Azteca
- Capacity: 87,523
- Owner(s): Ollamani (51%); General Atlantic (49%)
- Chairman: Emilio Azcárraga Jean
- Head coach: Guillermo Almada
- League: Liga MX
- Clausura 2026: Regular phase: 8th of 18; Final phase: Quarter-finals
- Website: clubamerica.com.mx
Home colours	Away colours

Club de Fútbol América S.A. de C.V., commonly known as Club América, and nicknamed Las Águilas (The Eagles), is a professional football club based in Mexico City. The club competes in Liga MX, the top division of Mexican football. The club was founded in 1916, and since 1959, it has been owned by mass media company Televisa. The team plays its home games at Estadio Azteca, the largest stadium in Latin America and one of the largest in the world.

América is one of the founding members of the Primera División. The club has a long-standing rivalry with Guadalajara, as both are the most successful and most supported teams in the country and are among the seven clubs to have never been relegated. Matches between them are known as El Súper Clásico, considered to be the biggest rivalry in Mexico, and one of the biggest in the world. América also plays derbies against Cruz Azul and Pumas UNAM. Together the clubs make up the "Big Four" of Mexican football. In 2024, it became the first football club to be floated on the Mexican Stock Exchange (Bolsa Mexicana de Valores). According to Sportico, Club América is valued at US$770 million as of May 2025, making it one of the most valuable clubs in North America.

Club América has won more titles than any other team in Mexican football. Domestically, the club has won a record sixteen league titles, a record six Copa México titles, and a joint-record seven Campeón de Campeones cups. In international competitions, América has won ten FIFA recognized club trophies, the most for a club from CONCACAF, with a joint-record seven CONCACAF Champions Cup/Champions League titles, one CONCACAF Giants Cup, and two Copa Interamericanas. The club also holds numerous distinctions, including topping the all-time league table in victories, points, and goals scored, most appearances in the liguilla (playoffs) stage, the most playoff final appearances (22) and second-most runner-up finishes, after Cruz Azul. It is one of five clubs to win back-to-back league titles since the introduction of the short tournament format, the only team to achieve a three-peat under the format, and the only one to reach four finals in a row. In 2021, América was named by the International Federation of Football History & Statistics as the best North American club of the first decade (2001–2011) of the 21st century.

== History ==
=== Founding ===
By 1916, football was already a popular sport in Mexico, particularly amongst college students in Mexico City. College students from Colegio Mascarones and Colegio Marista de la Perpetua formed two football teams with the names Récord and Colón. On 12 October 1916, the two squads decided to consolidate to make a more competitive squad. Many names were considered for this new squad – Pedro "Cheto" Quintanilla suggested the name "América", since they had formed the team on Columbus Day (Día del descubrimiento de América). The players agreed and soon designed a crest which had the map of the Americas centered with a 'C' for "Club" on the left and an 'A' for "América" on the right. In deciding the team's kit, Rafael Garza decided on navy blue trousers and a yellow shirt.

In 1916, Club América contested the Primera Fuerza league. At the time, América was the only club in Mexico City with Mexican-born players. Necaxa, Atlante, Real Club España, Germania, and Asturias were already members of the Liga Mayor de la Ciudad. América's acceptance into the league rested on three games they had to win. América won two games, tied the third and were accepted.

In 1918, the team changed its name to Club Centro Unión, though it would revert to using the name América only two years later.

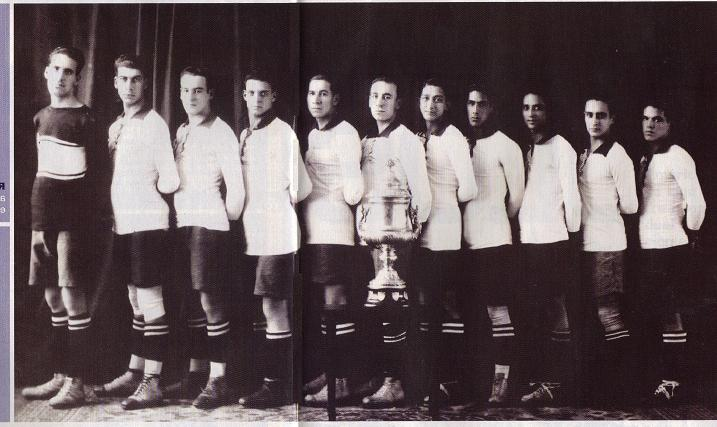
The Club América team which won the 1924–25 Primera Fuerza, considered the club's first honour in its history. Modern tallies of official honours do not take into account América's four Primera Fuerza titles.

América won their first Primera Fuerza title in the 1924–25 season, being crowned champions after defeating Asturias 1–0 in the deciding match. América would win the Primera Fuerza three more times, all of them back-to-back. In 1926, América became the first Mexican club to play outside of Mexico. Aside from broadening their horizons, Club América, along with Atlante petitioned to reduce the number of foreign players in the league. Shortly after the Mexican Football Federation was formed in 1928, Rafael Garza was designated as the Mexico national team's head coach. Most of the national team that participated in the 1928 Summer Olympics and 1930 World Cup consisted of players from Club América, Garza himself included.

=== 1940–1969 ===
Prior to 1942, several leagues existed throughout Mexico, with the Mexico City league widely regarded as the most developed. In 1942–43, the first National League was established and it was known as the Liga Mayor (Major League). Club América had declined from its then-prime of the 1920s and 1930s: aging players, diminishing financial resources, and resulting lack of interest made the team a bottom-feeder at the start of the beginning stage of the professional era.

It was also during this time that the rivalry with Guadalajara was born; especially during the 1945–1946 season when Guadalajara beat América by 6–4 and 4–2 scorelines. The 1951–1952 season saw América finish in 11th place out of 12, with a 3-point-advantage over Veracruz, who were relegated. In 1954 América defeated rivals Guadalajara on penalties after a 0–0 draw in the Copa México final, thus winning their first league cup.

In 1956, the club was sold to soft drink manufacturer Jarritos. The new owner was trying to build upon the club's National Cup titles in 1954 and 1955 against Guadalajara. During the 1954–55 season América won their first Campeón de Campeones championship, defeating Zacatepec 3–2. The owner failed to build upon previous success and on 22 July 1959, Emilio Azcárraga Milmo, owner of Telesistema Mexicano, bought América from Isaac Bessudo. Following the acquisition, Azcárraga told his players, "I do not know much about football, but I do know a lot about business, and this, gentlemen, will be a business."

The 1959–1960 season saw América reach second place in the league, behind Guadalajara. On 21 April 1964, at the Estadio Olímpico Universitario, the team, now coached by Alejandro Scopelli, defeated Monterrey in the final match of the Copa México. José González scored a second-half equalizer, and after a 1-1 draw América won the penalty shoot-out 5-4. Under the rules then in force, a single player could take all of a team’s kicks; Alfonso Portugal took all six and scored five.

On 7 May 1965, América regained the Mexican "Copa" championship after a 4–0 victory over Morelia at the Estadio Olímpico Universitario. The goals were scored by Javier Fragoso and Vavá, each scoring twice.

=== 1970s ===
After Mexico hosted the 1970 FIFA World Cup, the league tournament format was changed in response to the championship's disputed winners, hence the Liguilla (play-offs) format was started. The first play-off final was in 1971 between Toluca and América, leaders of Groups 1 and 2, respectively. After a 0–0 draw in Toluca, América obtained their second league title after winning the second-leg 2–0 at the Estadio Azteca. The following season saw América eliminated from the playoffs by Cruz Azul. América would defeat Cruz Azul in the 1973 Copa México final. A few years followed in which América did not qualify for the playoffs. They finished in first place during the 1975–1976 season, and defeated Tecos UAG and Union de Curtidores in the quarter-finals and semi-finals to reach the final against Universidad de Guadalajara. América won the championship after beating UDG in the Jalisco Stadium 3–0 and 1–0 at the Estadio Azteca. They also won the Campeón de Campeones title by beating Tigres UANL 2–0.

In 1978, América participated in their first Copa Interamericana, playing against Argentine club Boca Juniors, winners of the 1977 Copa Libertadores. After losing the first-leg and winning the second, América would win the championship in a playoff match by a score of 2–1 after extra-time, with a last second free-kick goal by midfielder Carlos Reinoso. América became the first team from Mexico and from the CONCACAF region to win the competition. América also became the first confederation side to earn the "double" in a single year as it won the delayed 1977 CONCACAF Champions' Cup.

=== 1980s ===
The 1980s are generally considered América's "golden decade". During this period, América won the league title five times, including three consecutive titles; the 1983–84 season, the 1984–85 season, the Prode-85 tournament, the 1987–88 and 1988–89 seasons. They also won the Mexican Super Cup twice, in 1987–88 and 1988–89, as well as the 1987 CONCACAF Champions' Cup.

The 1983–1984 season saw América reach the top of the table and reach the finals, where they would face arch-rivals Guadalajara, who the previous season had eliminated América in the semi-finals. Following a 2–2 draw at the Estadio Jalisco, América defeated Guadalajara in the Azteca Stadium 3–1, and a 5–3 aggregate score. To date, it is the only match between these two teams in the league finals, though they would face each other in other phases of the playoffs. The series has since been dubbed the "Final del Siglo" ("Final of the Century"). The following season América once again reached the finals, this time against city-rivals Pumas UNAM. After two draws in both the Azteca Stadium and the Mexico '68 Stadium, the last game was played in the Estadio Corregidora in Querétaro, where Daniel Brailovsky secured the championship for América by scoring two goals with the final score of 3–1.

Due to Mexico hosting the 1986 World Cup and stadium and infrastructure preparations, the tournament was split in two short tournaments: Prode-85 and Mexico-86. América clinched the top of their group in the Prode-85 and defeated Universidad de Guadalajara and Atlante (which was rescheduled following the earthquake suffered in Mexico City) to reach the final, where they faced Jaibos Tampico Madero. The game in Tampico was a 4–1 victory for Tampico, but at the Azteca Stadium, América beat Tampico Madero 4–0 to win the championship.

For the 1987–88 season, América met UNAM in the final, in a replay of the 1985 final. They defeated UNAM by an aggregate score of 4–2. The following season, América once again reached the league final and faced Cruz Azul, which was the first time the two clubs met in the final since 1972. The first-leg finished in a 3–2 victory for América. A 2–2 draw in the second-leg meant América won the championship by a 5–4 aggregate score.

As winners of the 1987 CONCACAF Champions' Cup, América was set to face Peñarol, winners of the 1987 Copa Libertadores, in the 1988 edition of the Copa Interamericana. Each respective confederation had agreed to the terms of the match, however just hours before it was to be played, disagreements arose between the confederations and the tournament's organizers. The match was eventually played on 21 April, with América winning 5–4 on penalties after a 2–2 draw; because the game was not officially endorsed, it was dubbed the Copa Confraternidad. América was subsequently fined and handed a two-year suspension from CONCACAF and thus could not participate in the 1989 Champions' Cup, for which they had qualified as winners of the 1988–89 Mexican league season.

=== 1990s ===
During the 1990s, América only managed to win the CONCACAF Champions' Cup in 1990 and 1992, and the 1990 Copa Interamericana. During the 1990–1991 season, América dominated its group and reached the playoffs to eliminate Universidad de Guadalajara in the quarter-final round and Guadalajara in the semi-final round, only to reach the final and lose to UNAM.

In 1994, club president Emilio Diez Barroso announced the hiring of Dutch manager Leo Beenhakker. The club also announced the signing of two African players, Cameroon international François Omam-Biyik and Zambia national team captain Kalusha Bwalya. Other Mexican players such as Joaquín del Olmo, Raúl Gutiérrez, among others were signed as well. América finished the season with 51 points, and scoring 88 goals. With only a few matches remaining in the regular season, Beenhakker was abruptly fired as manager. It was rumored that conflict between the coach and Diez Barosso regarding Beenhacker's defending of playing Del Olmo was the reason for his sacking. América reached the semi-finals, losing to Cruz Azul. This América team is considered one of the best in the club's history, despite not winning any silverware.

In 1998 América, along with Guadalajara, became the first Mexican club to participate in the Copa Libertadores tournament. They were inserted in a group where both teams confronted clubs from Venezuela. América finished in second position of the qualifying stage and advanced to the group stages. América was put in Group 3 along with Guadalajara and Brazilian clubs Grêmio and Vasco da Gama. América qualified to the next round finishing in third place, being eliminated by Argentine club River Plate.

=== 2000s ===
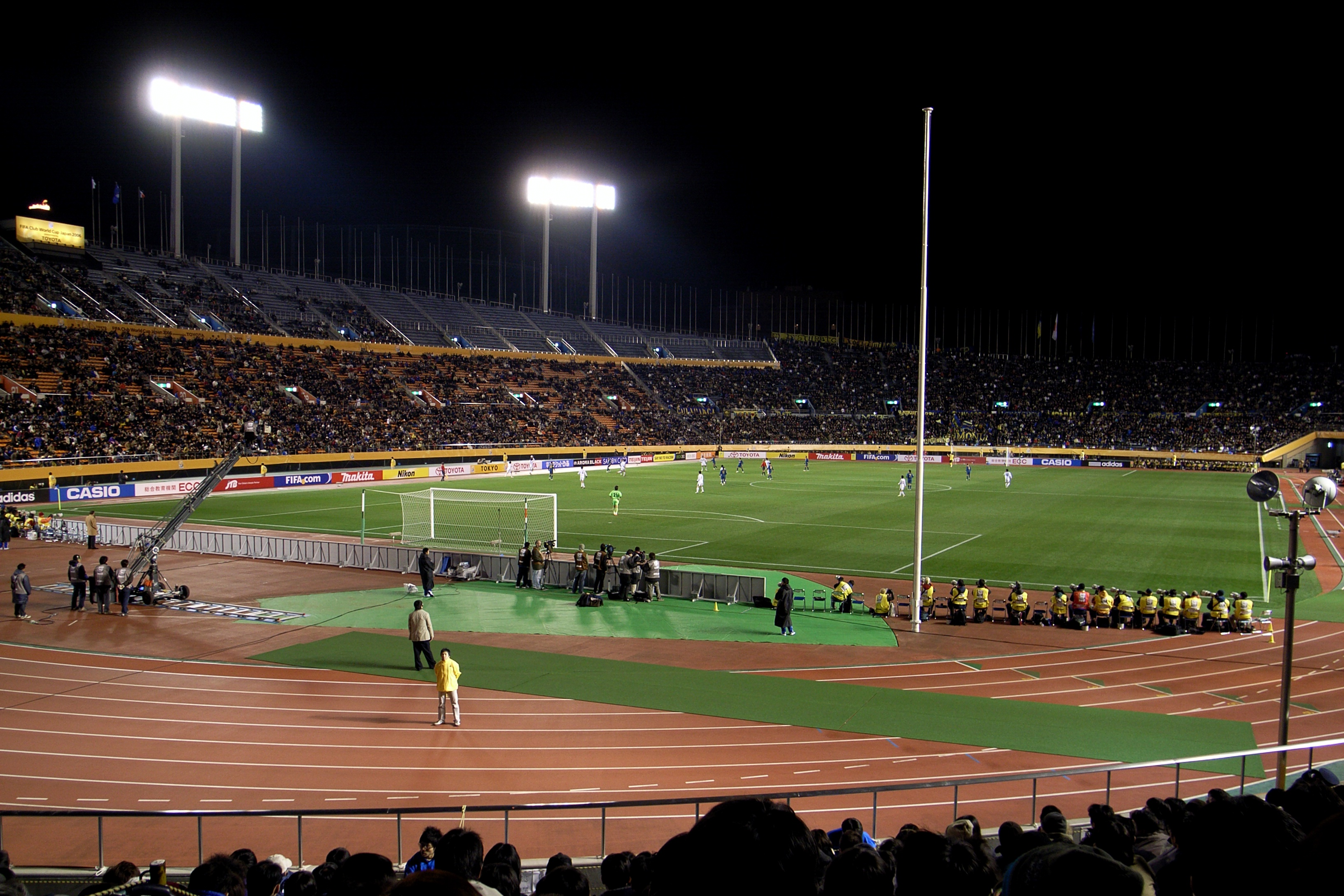
América in the 2006 FIFA Club World Cup playing against Jeonbuk Hyundai Motors (South Korea)

In August 2001, América won the CONCACAF Giants Cup after defeating MLS club D.C. United 2–0. The following year, América would reach the league final against Necaxa, winning by a 3–2 aggregate score. After losing in the first-leg 0–2, América won the second by the same scoreline, forcing extra-time to be played. A golden goal from a Hugo Norberto Castillo header in the 107th minute gave América the victory, and the club its first league championship in 13 years.

The club once again reached the league final during the Clausura 2005 tournament, finishing third in the standings and defeating Santos Laguna and Cruz Azul in the quarterfinals and semi-finals to face Tecos UAG. After a 1–1 draw in the first-leg, América was victorious in the second, winning the match 6–3 at the Estadio Azteca – 7–4 on aggregate – to win the club's tenth league title.

On 19 April 2006, América defeated fellow-Mexican side Toluca to win the CONCACAF Champions' Cup, thus qualifying for the FIFA Club World Cup that same year. At the tournament, América won its first match against Jeonbuk Hyundai Motors of South Korea. América went on to lose the next match against Spanish side FC Barcelona. It ended its participation in the tournament, losing the match for third place to Al Ahly of Egypt.

==== 2007 ====
After the Club World Cup, América qualified for the playoffs of the Clausura 2007 defeating Atlas and Guadalajara in the quarter and semi-finals. They played the final against Pachuca, finishing runners-up.

For the Apertura 2007, after starting off the season on a poor run, Luis Fernando Tena was sacked, and was replaced by Daniel Brailovsky. After finishing third in their group and sixth in the general standings, América played Morelia for the last spot in the playoffs, being beaten 3–0 in the first-leg, and winning 1–0 in the second-leg. With this, América was eliminated from the competition.

América also participated in the Copa Sudamericana, reaching the finals to play against Arsenal de Sarandí of Argentina. They would lose the first-leg at the Estadio Azteca by a 2–3 score, and win 2–1 in Argentina. The aggregate result was 4–4, but due to the away goals rule, Arsenal won the championship.

América finished 2007 ranked tenth in the IFFHS's Club World Rankings, becoming the first Mexican club to reach the top ten.

==== 2008 ====
América started off 2008 winning the InterLiga tournament, defeating Cruz Azul 5–3 on penalties in the final following a 3–3 draw after 120 minutes, thus assuring qualification to the Copa Libertadores tournament that same year.

The Clausura tournament saw América end in next-to-last place in the general standings. This had not been seen since the mid-1950s. In the first five months of 2008, América was showered with twelve defeats, two draws and three victories, which resulted in the third-straight tournament without qualifying for the playoffs. The manager at the time was Rubén Omar Romano, who was one of the least successful coaches in the club's history. Coincidentally, after being replaced by Juan Antonio Luna, América got their third victory of the Clausura against Monterrey. Despite their poor domestic form, América fared well in the Copa Libertadores, defeating Brazilian side Flamengo 3–0 in the round-of-16 at the Estádio do Maracanã, overturning a 2–4 first-leg deficit, and advancing to the quarter-finals. They defeated Santos FC to reach the semi-finals, being eliminated by eventual champions LDU Quito after drawing 1–1 on aggregate.

=== 2010s ===
For the Apertura 2010, América brought back former manager Manuel Lapuente, who led the club to the league title in 2002. The return of striker Vicente Matías Vuoso and the signing of Uruguayan Vicente Sánchez gave América one of the most dangerous front lines in all of the league. They finished the tournament in first place of Group 2, fourth in the general standings, with 27 points. With this, they would advance to the playoffs, and automatically qualify for the first time since 2008 for the 2011 Copa Libertadores. They would be eliminated in the semi-finals by Santos Laguna by a 4–5 aggregate score.

América had a bad start to the Clausura 2011 tournament; a 0–2–1 record in the first three games the tournament led to the sacking of Lapuente. Carlos Reinoso was named his successor, who had already managed the club two times before. His first game was against Atlas, which América won 2–0. América ended the Clausura with an 8–1–5 record, and would be eliminated in the quarter-finals by Morelia. On 18 September 2011, Reinoso was sacked as manager, with Alfredo Tena taking over as interim manager. América would finish the Apertura in 17th place, the second worse finish in the club's history. On 8 November, Michel Bauer stepped down as president. That same day, former América player Ricardo Peláez was named Sporting President, while Yon De Luisa would be named Operations President. Miguel Herrera was presented as the club's new manager, the fourth in a year. In his first year at the helm, Herrera led the team to consecutive semi-finals.

On 26 May 2013, América won their eleventh league title by defeating Cruz Azul in the Clausura final 4–2 on penalties after a dramatic comeback from a 0–1 first-leg loss to win 2–1 in the second-leg, and tie 2–2 on aggregate, with goalkeeper Moisés Muñoz scoring the second goal in injury-time. With this, América tied Guadalajara for most league titles. For the Apertura 2013, América finished the regular phase of the tournament at the top of the standings with 37 points and would again appear in the league final, though failing to achieve a repeat, being defeated by León by an aggregate score of 1–5. On 17 December 2013, Antonio Mohamed was announced as América's new manager for the Clausura 2014 tournament, replacing Miguel Herrera after two years in charge. América would finish fifth in the standings, and was eliminated in the quarter-finals by Santos Laguna due to the away-goals rule after drawing 6–6 on aggregate.

América finished the Apertura 2014 tournament at the top of the general standings with 31 points, and defeated UNAM and Monterrey in the quarter-finals and semi-finals, respectively. Prior to the league final, the club was marred in media speculation regarding the future of Antonio Mohamed (he ultimately admitted he would leave the club after the final) and the separation of Paul Aguilar from the team prior to the first-leg of the semi-finals. On 14 December, América won a record-twelfth league title after defeating Tigres UANL 3–1 on aggregate in the final, coming back from a 0–1 first-leg loss to win 3–0 in the second-leg at the Estadio Azteca. Three days after winning the final, América announced Gustavo Matosas as Mohamed's successor, signing a two-year contract.

In April 2015, the club won its sixth CONCACAF Champions League title after defeating Montreal Impact in the finals by a 5–3 aggregate score. Despite inconsistent displays throughout the Clausura tournament, América managed to finish second in the standings, though was eliminated by Pachuca in the quarter-finals. Three days later, with various media reports suggesting Gustavo Matosas would be sacked due to differences with the board regarding transfer strategy, it was confirmed in a press conference which was attended by both Matosas and club president Ricardo Pelaéz that he would indeed leave after only six months in charge. On 26 May, Ignacio Ambríz was presented as the new manager, signing a two-year contract. América lost its FIFA Club World Cup quarter-final match to Chinese team Guangzhou Evergrande, and defeated African club TP Mazembe to claim fifth place in the competition.

In April 2016, América successfully defended the CONCACAF Champions League title after defeating Tigres UANL 4–1 on aggregate in the finals, and winning a record seventh continental title. América culminated the year with a fourth place finish at the Club World Cup and finishing runners-up in the Apertura championship match against Tigres UANL.

América won its record thirteenth league title following a 2–0 aggregate victory over Cruz Azul in the 2018 Apertura final. In April 2019, América defeated Ascenso MX side FC Juárez in the final of the Clausura edition of the Copa MX, winning a record sixth title. In winning the cup, América became the outright record holders of the Liga MX, Copa MX, and CONCACAF Champions League. The team followed this up by winning the 2019 Campeón de Campeones against Tigres UANL and reaching the 2019 Apertura finals, losing 4–2 on penalties to Monterrey.

=== 2020–present ===
América began the new decade by finishing third in the Apertura general standings before being eliminated by Guadalajara in the quarter-finals. They finished the following Clausura in second place, only to be eliminated once again in the quarter-final stage, this time against Pachuca. América led the table during the 2021 Apertura and faced elimination in the same phase again, losing 3–1 on aggregate to UNAM. From the 2022 Clausura onwards, América managed to qualify consecutively to the semi-finals, only to face eliminations against Pachuca, Toluca (2022 Apertura), and Guadalajara (2023 Clausura), respectively.

Under new manager André Jardine, América ended the regular phase of the 2023 Apertura first in the standings, with the best attacking and defensive records. They defeated Tigres UANL 4–1 on aggregate in the finals to win a record-extending 14th title and end the club's five-year league drought. América successfully defended the title after defeating Cruz Azul in the 2024 Clausura finals, winning back-to-back Liga MX titles for the first time in the club's history since the introduction of the playoff format, and becoming the fourth club to do so under the format. They also became the first team to achieve this feat after having topped the standings of both Apertura and Clausura championships. In December, América defeated Monterrey 3–2 on aggregate in the Apertura finals to win their 16th league title, and become the first side to win three Liga MX titles in a row in the short-tournament era. The following Clausura saw América make an unprecedented fourth consecutive appearance in the finals, though they lost to Toluca 2–0 on aggregate. After this defeat Club América would also fail to qualify for 2025 FIFA Club World Cup, losing to LAFC 2–1 in the playoffs. Later they would lose again to Toluca 1–3 in the 2025 Campeón de Campeones.

On 23 December 2025, Ollamani (formed after Televisa spun off their sports and gambling operations, including América, in 2024) announced that they would enter a partnership with General Atlantic that would see the club run under a new entity known as Grupo Águilas. Ollamani would have a 51% stake in Grupo Águilas and continue to run América and Estadio Banorte, while General Atlantic would own the remaining 49% stake. The new entity would also have a partnership with the Kraft Analytics Group, who share the same ownership as the NFL club New England Patriots. The deal gives Ollamani Group, Club América's owner, a 51% controlling share, with Emilio Azcárraga Jean leading the new entity to boost growth, modernize the stadium for the 2026 World Cup, and expand the club's global brand, marking a major shift in Mexican football investment.

== Crest and colors ==
=== Crest ===
When Club América was founded in 1916, the crest consisted of the letter 'C', standing for "Club", overlapped by an 'A', which stood for "América". After a brief period in which the team's name was changed to Club Unión, it was reverted to Club América in the mid-1920s, and the crest was modified, with a map of the Americas behind the 'CA', and encased in a football, all in the team's colors – which were cream and blue. Since then, the design of the crest has seen minimal change; at the beginning of the 21st century, the vertical line at the crest's center was removed. During the early 1980s, the crest was surrounded by an image of an eagle (due to the club's nickname), and was even enclosed in a triangle. The most recent modification of the crest was in 2010, with the yellow and blue more vibrant and a darker outline and border.

=== Colors ===
Club founder Rafael Garza chose what would be América's first uniform with his father's navy blue trousers and a yellow shirt. The club's kit design would go largely unchanged, and it would not be until the 1980s that the team colors changed, with the cream replaced with a more vibrant yellow and blue, along with the introduction of the inverted triangle design on the shirt in 1982. A third, alternate white and blue shirt was introduced towards the end of the decade, but it was not worn frequently.

During the Apertura 2011 tournament – what was the club's 95th anniversary – a commemorative jersey was unveiled paying homage to the original uniform, as well as an altered crest. The uniform was used during the Súper Clásico match against Guadalajara.

In May 2016, as part of the club's centenary, a dark red away kit was revealed honouring Italian club Torino, who functioned as the club's first opponent at the Estadio Azteca in the 1966 inaugural match.

== Nicknames ==
Throughout Club América's history, it has been given a number of nicknames. During the club's early years it was given the nickname Estudiantes (Students), because it had been established as a result of a merger of students from the colleges of Mascarones and La Perpetua. They were also given the nicknames Cremas (Creams) and Azul-cremas (Blue-creams) in reference to the kit colors. During the 1960s, following businessman Emilio Azcárraga Milmo's purchase of Club América, it was given its infamous Millonetas (Millionaires) nickname. In an effort to change the fortunes of the club which for years had been struggling financially and was suffering a five-year trophy-less drought, Azcárraga Milmo prioritized high-profile signings of foreign players and executives, notably hiring Guillermo Cañedo de la Bárcena, the successful president of Zacatepec. The Águilas (Eagles) nickname was the result of a rebranding and media campaign undertaken by Televisa in 1981. Along with a new kit and color scheme, the Águilas nickname was introduced at a press conference held by the club at the Estadio Azteca.

== Grounds ==
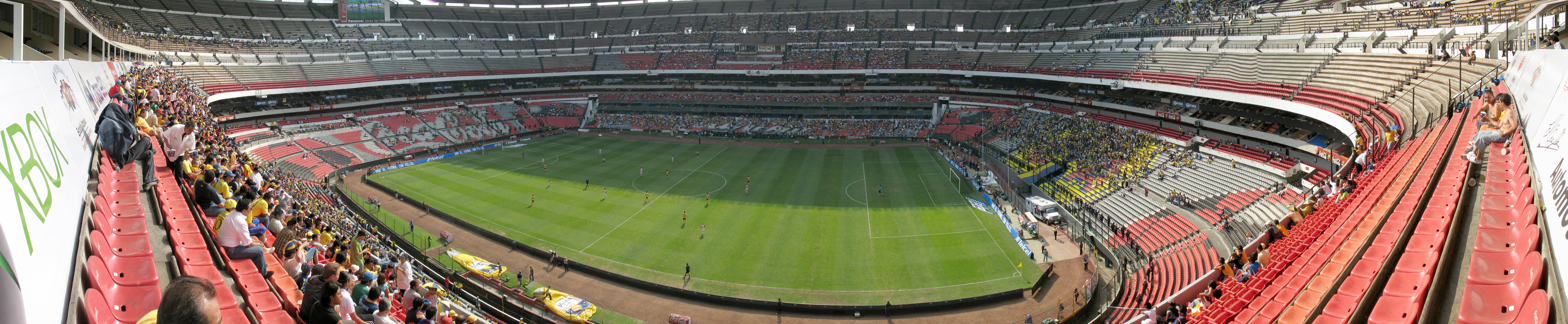
A panorama of the Estadio Azteca during a league match against Tecos

América plays its home games at the Estadio Azteca in Mexico City. The stadium was designed by Mexican architect Pedro Ramírez Vázquez, and was inaugurated on 29 May 1966 with a match between América and Torino, which was tied 2–2. The first goal was scored was by Brazilian Arlindo Dos Santos and the second by José Alves. Gustavo Díaz Ordaz, President of Mexico, made the initial kick and Sir Stanley Rous, FIFA President, was the witness.

The club has shared the stadium as a home ground with the Mexico national football team since its inauguration. Other club sides have also used the stadium as their home at different times, namely Necaxa (1966–70 and 1982–2003), Atlante (1966–82, 1996–2001 and 2004–2007), Universidad Nacional (1967–1969), Atlético Español (1970–1982) and Cruz Azul (1971–1996 and 2018–2023).

As well as acting as a home ground the stadium has also hosted the 1968 Summer Olympics, 1970 FIFA World Cup, 1975 Pan American Games, 1983 FIFA World Youth Championship, 1986 FIFA World Cup, 1999 FIFA Confederations Cup, 2011 FIFA U-17 World Cup Final, Copa Interamericana, Copa Libertadores de América, music concerts, political events and the visit of Pope John Paul II in 1999.

== Rivalries ==
=== El Super Clásico ===
The Súper Clásico, also known as the Clásico Nacional or Clásico de Clásicos, is the football rivalry between C.D. Guadalajara (Chivas) and América. The rivalry became prominent during the late 1950s and developed into a nationally recognized fixture in Mexican football. Historically, the clubs have been associated with contrasting approaches to player acquisition, with Guadalajara maintaining its tradition of fielding exclusively Mexican players, and América known for recruiting foreign players. The teams have faced each other in Liga MX, domestic cup competitions, the Copa Libertadores and CONCACAF competitions. Both teams are the most successful teams in Liga MX, holding the most titles between both.

=== Clásico Capitalino ===
The rivalry between Club América and Club Universidad Nacional is known as the "Clásico Capitalino", due to the fact that both teams are based in Mexico City—the country's capital. The first match between the two clubs took place on 1 July 1962, where América hosted UNAM, who had recently been promoted from the second division. In Mexico the match is often perceived as the representation of a struggle between two antagonistic powers and institutions: Club América is regarded as the club representing the establishment and the wealthy. The fact that the club is owned by the mass media company Televisa has further intensified this image. Club Universidad, representing the Universidad Nacional Autónoma de México, identifies itself as the club of the intellectuals and middle-class. The rivalry is particularly fierce from UNAM's side: according to surveys the majority of their supporters consider América as their main rival. However, America's fans see it as an important match but deem the match against Chivas as more important.

=== Clásico Joven ===
Club América's other capital-based rival is Cruz Azul, with matches between the two known as the "Clásico Joven" ("Juvenile Classic" or "Young Classic" in Spanish). In a similar perspective between América and UNAM's rivalry, the rivalry between América and Cruz Azul is also seen as based on social class differences: América representing the wealthy and powerful while Cruz Azul is said to represent the working class, hence fans of Cruz Azul and the team itself being dubiously referred to by the nickname of "Los Albañiles" (bricklayers in Spanish), a reference to Cruz Azul's eponymous parent company, which is one of Mexico's major companies specializing in concrete and construction.

== Support ==
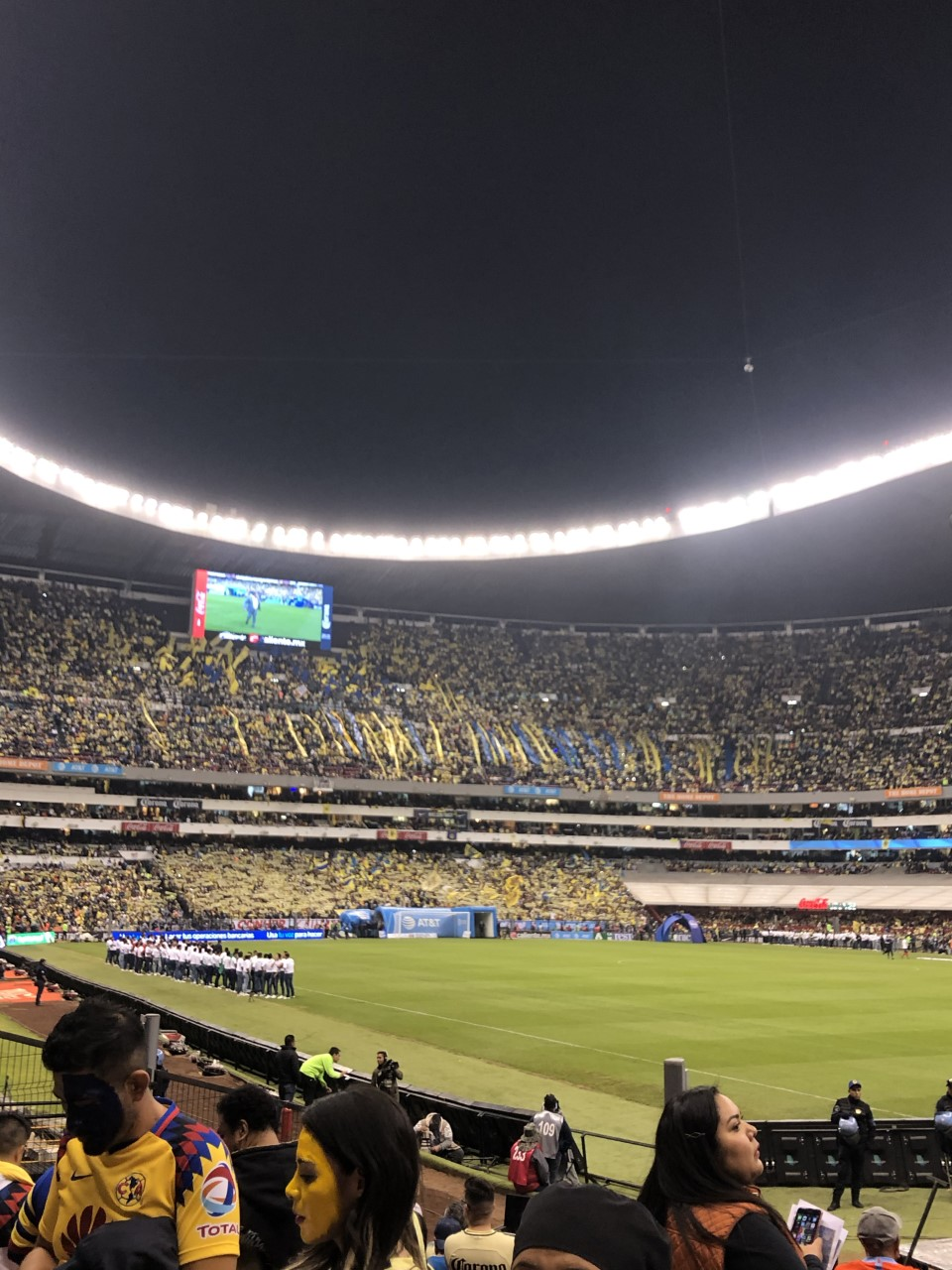
América supporters at Estadio Azteca in 2019

Club América has consistently ranked, along with rivals Guadalajara, as Mexico's most supported team. In December 2013, the newspaper Reforma had América as the country's most popular club with 25 percent in a nationwide survey, and the most popular in Mexico City. In a February 2015 poll conducted by the firm Consulta Mitofsky, América was named the most popular club with 31.1 percent of the population being supporters, more than rivals Guadalajara (17.9) and Cruz Azul (12.7) combined. In 2016 and 2017 America was the country's most supported team, and in 2018 fell to second behind Guadalajara. In 2019 América regained the top spot with 32 percent, doubling the amount of Guadalajara supporters for the first time. As of June 2025, América is Mexico's most supported team with 21 percent, and the most hated with 46.2 percent. Its extensive fan base also makes Club América among the most followed teams on social media, ranking third in all of Latin America behind only Brazilian sides Flamengo and Corinthians. Additionally, it generates the most social media interactions in Mexico, and among the most in Latin America.

América is also among the most popular teams in the United States. According to a 2020 survey by Gilt Edge Soccer Marketing, América is the ninth most popular team in the U.S., the only non-European in the top ten, and the only one from Latin America. Also, a 2014 study conducted by EuroAmericas Sports Marketing ranked América as the most popular Mexican club in Asia.

Conversely, América is the most hated team in Mexico, ranking first in that metric in every annual survey. Ever since the club was bought by media mogul Emilio Azcárraga Milmo from Issac Bessudo in 1959, the club has had the unique distinction of being both one of the most popular clubs and the most hated. An emphasis on heavy spending on Mexican and foreign players and managers in subsequent seasons, as well as success in domestic and international competitions, created an increasing sense of enmity from rival fans. The fact that Azcárraga Milmo was also the owner of telecommunications company Telesistema Mexicano furthered the notion that América was the club of the "establishment" and the "wealthy", while others were considered teams representing the "working class". Being reputed as the most hated club in the country has been embraced by the club and its fans, with the phrase "Ódiame Más" ("Hate me more" in English) being known as one of the team's unofficial slogans.

Three Club América supporters' groups (barra bravas in Spanish) exist: La Monumental, Disturbio, and Ritual del Kaos. La Monumental was established in April 1999 as the first barra brava officially recognized by the club, however internal conflicts led some members to leave the group and establish Ritual del Kaos that same year. The group is not officially recognized by Club América. Disturbio was created in October 2000 as an affiliate group of La Monumental. Both groups occupy a section of the lower north zone of the Estadio Azteca during home games, while Ritual occupies a section in the upper north zone.

== Sponsorship ==
Additional club sponsors and partners:

- (United States) Carl's Jr.
- (United States) Coca-Cola
- (Mexico) Corona
- (Japan) eFootball
- (China) Geely Auto
- (Mexico) Gonher
- (Mexico) GNP Seguros
- (Mexico) Grupo Bimbo
- (Canada) Immunotec
- (United States) Powerade
- (Austria) Red Bull
- (Mexico) Restonic
- (Switzerland) Sika AG
- (Mexico) Viva

== Personnel ==
=== Management ===
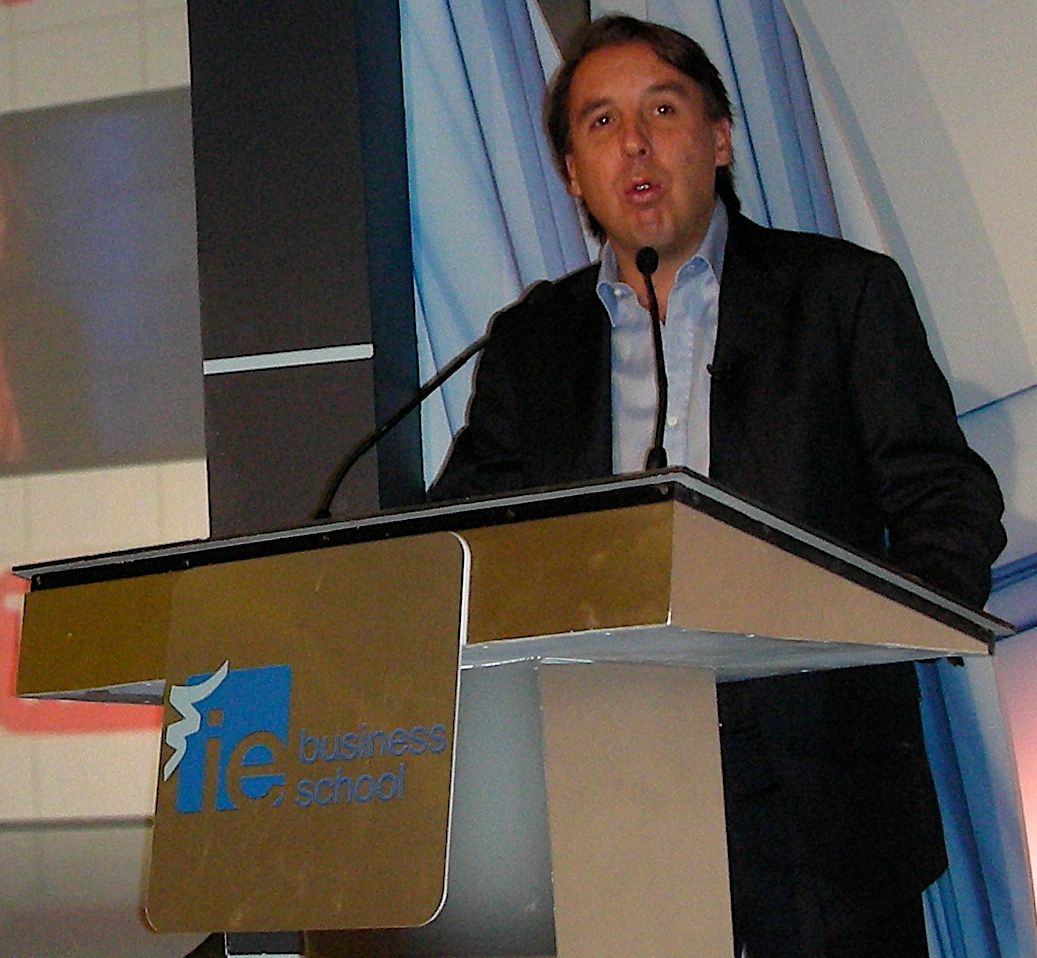
Since 2011, Emilio Azcárraga Jean serves as the chairman of Grupo Televisa's Committee of Football.

Position	Staff
Chairman	Emilio Azcárraga Jean
Honorary counsel	Bernardo Gómez Martínez
Sporting president	Santiago Baños
Sporting director	Antonio Ibrahim
Operations president	Ferran Reverter
Committee of football president	Joaquín Balcarcel
Coordinator of strategic planning	Miguel Ángel Garza
Academy director	Raúl Herrera
Academy operations coordinator	Carlos Valenzuela
Director of communications and marketing	Diego Solano Urrusquieta
Director of public relations	Karina Mora

Source: Club América

=== Coaching staff ===
Position	Staff
Manager	(Uruguay) Guillermo Almada
Assistant managers	(Uruguay) Darwin Quintana
Assistant managers	(Uruguay) Gianni Michelini
Assistant managers	(Mexico) Raúl Lara
Assistant managers	(Spain) Xavier Mayol
Goalkeeper coach	(Mexico) Luis Gurrola
Fitness coaches	(Mexico) Francisco Martínez
Fitness coaches	(Uruguay) Rubens Valenzuela
Physiotherapists	(Argentina) Fernando Gilardi
Physiotherapists	(Mexico) Octavio Luna
Physiotherapists	(Mexico) Francisco Faustino
Team doctors	(Mexico) Alfonso Díaz
Team doctors	(Mexico) José Guadalupe Vázquez
Team doctors	(Argentina) Christian Motta

Source: Club América

== Players ==
=== First-team squad ===
As of 14 September 2026

Note: Flags indicate national team as defined under FIFA eligibility rules; some limited exceptions apply. Players may hold more than one non-FIFA nationality.

No.	Pos.	Nation	Player
1	GK	MEX	Luis Malagón
2	DF	MEX	Emilio Lara
3	DF	MEX	Israel Reyes
5	DF	MEX	Kevin Álvarez
6	MF	USA	Edwin Cerrillo
7	FW	URU	Brian Rodríguez
8	MF	ESP	Carlos Álvarez
9	FW	MEX	Henry Martín (captain)
10	FW	USA	Alejandro Zendejas
12	FW	MEX	Isaías Violante
13	MF	MEX	Alan Cervantes
14	DF	URU	Santiago Bueno (on loan from Wolverhampton Wanderers)
15	DF	ARG	Santiago Ramos Mingo

No.	Pos.	Nation	Player
20	MF	MEX	Alexis Gutiérrez
21	GK	MEX	Fernando Tapia
22	FW	COL	Óscar Perea
23	MF	BRA	Raphael Veiga (on loan from Palmeiras)
24	DF	MEX	Franco Rossano
26	DF	COL	Cristian Borja
28	MF	MEX	Érick Sánchez
29	DF	MEX	Ramón Juárez
30	GK	MEX	Rodolfo Cota
31	GK	MEX	César Lugo
32	DF	MEX	Miguel Vázquez
34	MF	MEX	Dagoberto Espinoza
93	FW	COL	Miguel Borja

=== Youth squad ===
Note: Flags indicate national team as defined under FIFA eligibility rules; some limited exceptions apply. Players may hold more than one non-FIFA nationality.

No.	Pos.	Nation	Player
186	MF	MEX	Diego Arriaga
189	FW	MEX	Alejandro Cárdenas

No.	Pos.	Nation	Player
206	MF	MEX	Derek Jiménez
217	MF	BRA	Ícaro

=== Other players under contract ===
Note: Flags indicate national team as defined under FIFA eligibility rules; some limited exceptions apply. Players may hold more than one non-FIFA nationality.

No. / Pos. / Nation / Player; 11 / FW / CHI / Víctor Dávila (injured)	No. / Pos. / Nation / Player; 19 / FW / COL / Raúl Zúñiga (injured)

=== Out on loan ===
Note: Flags indicate national team as defined under FIFA eligibility rules; some limited exceptions apply. Players may hold more than one non-FIFA nationality.

No.	Pos.	Nation	Player
—	DF	URU	Thiago Espinosa (at Peñarol)
—	MF	MEX	Miguel Carreón (at Oaxaca)
—	MF	BRA	Rodrigo Dourado (at Juárez)
—	MF	MEX	Santiago Naveda (at Venados)
—	MF	USA	Miguel Ramírez (at Tlaxcala)

No.	Pos.	Nation	Player
—	MF	MEX	Patrick Villa (at Oaxaca)
—	FW	MEX	Esteban Lozano (at Santos Laguna)
—	FW	MEX	Diego Reyes (at Flamengo)
—	FW	MEX	Patricio Salas (at Famalicão)

=== Reserve teams ===
América Coyoacán
Reserve team that plays in the Liga TDP, the fourth level of the Mexican league system.

=== Notable players ===
==== Historic players ====
As part of Club América's centennial celebrations in 2016, a public vote was taken via the club's website in which the following players were chosen as "Historic Players". Players whose names appear italicized played for the club at the time the votes were taken.

Goalkeepers

- (Mexico) Guillermo Ochoa
- (Mexico) Moisés Muñoz
- (Mexico) Adolfo Ríos
- (Argentina) Héctor Zelada

Defenders

- (Mexico) Alfredo Tena
- (Mexico) Mario Trejo
- (Mexico) Armando Manzo
- (Mexico) Juan Hernández
- (Mexico) José Antonio Castro
- (Uruguay) Cesilio de los Santos
- (Mexico) Vinicio Bravo
- (Mexico) Duilio Davino
- (Mexico) Miguel Layún

Midfielders

- (Israel) Daniel Brailovsky
- (Chile) Carlos Reinoso
- (Brazil) Antônio Carlos Santos
- (Mexico) Pável Pardo
- (Mexico) Germán Villa
- (Argentina) Eduardo Bacas
- (Mexico) Gonzalo Farfán
- (Mexico) Alfredo Sánchez
- (Mexico) Cristóbal Ortega
- (Zambia) Kalusha Bwalya
- (Paraguay) Osvaldo Martínez
- (Argentina) Rubens Sambueza

Forwards

- (Mexico) Cuauhtémoc Blanco
- (Paraguay) Salvador Cabañas
- (Ecuador) Christian Benítez
- (Mexico) Luís Roberto Alves
- (Mexico) Raúl Jiménez
- (Argentina) Claudio López
- (Mexico) Enrique Borja
- (Cameroon) François Omam-Biyik
- (Chile) Iván Zamorano
- (Brazil) José Alves
- (Chile) Osvaldo Castro
- (Mexico) Roberto Rodríguez
- (Mexico) Eduardo González Pálmer

=== Player records ===
==== Top scorers ====
Primera División

- (Mexico) Eduardo González Pálmer (1958–59; 25)
- (Brazil) José Alves (1965–66; 20)
- (Mexico) Enrique Borja (1970–71; 20)
- (Mexico) Enrique Borja (1971–72; 26)
- (Mexico) Enrique Borja (1972–73; 24)
- (Chile) Osvaldo Castro (1973–74; 26)
- (Argentina) Norberto Outes (1982–83; 22)
- (Mexico) Cuauhtémoc Blanco (Invierno 1998; 16)
- (Brazil) Kléber (Apertura 2005; 11)
- (Mexico) Ángel Reyna (Clausura 2011; 13)
- (Ecuador) Christian Benítez (Clausura 2012; 14)
- (Ecuador) Christian Benítez (Apertura 2012; 11)
- (Ecuador) Christian Benítez (Clausura 2013; 12)
- (Mexico) Henry Martín (Clausura 2023; 14)

International

- (Mexico) Hugo Sánchez (1992 CONCACAF Champions' Cup; 5)
- (Mexico) Aarón Padilla (2006 CONCACAF Champions' Cup; 4)
- (Paraguay) Salvador Cabañas (2007 Copa Libertadores; 10)
- (Paraguay) Salvador Cabañas (2008 Copa Libertadores; 8)
- (Argentina) Darío Benedetto / (Mexico) Oribe Peralta (2014–15 CONCACAF Champions League; 7)

=== All-time records ===
All current players are in bold

Most goals scored
Rank	Name	Years	Goals
1	(Mexico) Luís Roberto Alves	1986–1996; 1997–1998	188
2	(Mexico) Cuauhtémoc Blanco	1994–1997; 1998–2000; 2002–2004; 2005–2007; 2016	153
3	(Mexico) Octavio Vial	1937–1945	152
4	(Mexico) **Henry Martín**	2018–Present	128
5	(Brazil) José Alves	1961–1969	109
6	(Mexico) Enrique Borja	1969–1977	104
7	(Mexico) Eduardo González Pálmer	1951–1962	101
8	(Chile) Carlos Reinoso	1970–1979	99
9	(Paraguay) Salvador Cabañas	2006–2010	98
10	(Mexico) Carlos Hermosillo	1983–1989; 2000	94

Most appearances
Rank	Name	Years	Apps
1	(Mexico) Cristóbal Ortega	1974–1992	711
2	(Mexico) Alfredo Tena	1974–1992	594
3	(Mexico) Germán Villa	1991–1998; 1999; 2000–2008	527
4	(Mexico) Luís Roberto Alves	1986–1996; 1997–1998	490
5	(Mexico) Guillermo Ochoa	2004–2011; 2019–2021	433
5	(Mexico) Gonzalo Farfán	1984–1994	433
7	(Mexico) Pável Pardo	1999–2006; 2009–2011	407
8	(Mexico) Duilio Davino	1997–2007	402
9	(Mexico) Adrián Chávez	1986–1996	401
10	(Mexico) Cuauhtémoc Blanco	1994–1997; 1998–2000; 2002–2004; 2005–2007; 2016	397

== Managers ==
=== Notable managers ===
The following managers have won at least one trophy while in charge of América:

Manager	Period	Trophies
(Mexico) Rafael Garza	1917–1919; 1920–1926; 1929–1931; 1933–1935; 1935–1936, 1937–1942, 1946–1949	2 Primera Fuerza
(England) Percy Clifford	1926–1929	2 Primera Fuerza
(Mexico) Octavio Vial	1949–50; 1952–1955	2 Copa México; 1 Campeón de Campeones
(Argentina) Alejandro Scopelli	1964–1965	2 Copa México
(Uruguay) Roberto Scarone	1965–1966	1 Primera División
(Mexico) José Antonio Roca	1970–1975; 1979–1981	1 Primera División; 1 Copa México
(Mexico) Raúl Cárdenas	1975–1978	1 Primera División; 1 Campeón de Campeones; 1 CONCACAF Champions' Cup; 1 Copa Interamericana
(Chile) Carlos Reinoso	1981–1984; 1998; 2011	1 Primera División
(Argentina) Miguel Ángel López	1984–1987; 1992–1993	2 Primera División; 1 CONCACAF Champions' Cup
(Argentina) Vicente Cayetano Rodríguez	1987	1 CONCACAF Champions' Cup
(Brazil) Jorge Vieira	1987–1990	2 Primera División; 2 Campéon de Campeónes
(Uruguay) Carlos Miloc	1991	1 CONCACAF Champions' Cup; 1 Copa Interamericana
(Argentina) Alfio Basile	2000–2001	1 CONCACAF Giants Cup
(Mexico) Manuel Lapuente	2001–2003; 2006; 2010–2011	1 Primera División; 1 CONCACAF Champions' Cup
(Mexico) Mario Carrillo	2004–2005	1 Primera División; 1 Campeón de Campeones
(Mexico) Miguel Herrera	2012–2013; 2017–2020	2 Liga MX; 1 Copa MX; 1 Campeón de Campeones
(Argentina) Antonio Mohamed	2014	1 Liga MX
(Uruguay) Gustavo Matosas	2015	1 CONCACAF Champions League
(Mexico) Ignacio Ambríz	2015–2016	1 CONCACAF Champions League
(Brazil) André Jardine	2023–2026	3 Liga MX; 1 Campeón de Campeones; 1 Supercopa de la Liga MX; 1 Campeones Cup

== Presidents ==
Since the club was established in 1916, América has had 27 club presidents, with the first being Florencio Domínguez, who served from 1916 to 1920. Guillermo Cañedo de la Bácerna is the club's longest-serving president who served from 1961 to 1981. Filiberto Zapata had the shortest term in the club's history – serving less than year – in 1940. The current sporting president is Santiago Baños.

In 1951, actor and comedian Cantinflas was named Honorary President of the club.

== Honours ==
Club América is the most decorated side in Mexican football. The club has won 16 league titles, 6 Copa México championships, 7 Campeón de Campeones cups, and 1 Supercopa de la Liga MX. They hold the record for most league and cup titles, and their record Campeón de Campeones wins are tied with Guadalajara. In international competitions América has won 10 titles, the most for a club from the CONCACAF. The club has won 8 continental championships, including a joint-record 7 CONCACAF Champions Cup/Champions League titles (shared with Cruz Azul), and 1 CONCACAF Giants Cup. Additionally, the club has won 1 Campeones Cup, a regional competition held between Liga MX and MLS clubs. In intercontinental competitions, América has won 2 Copa Interamericanas, a record amongst CONCACAF clubs. From 2019 to 2025, América held the distinction of being the outright record winner of its domestic league, cup competition, and confederation.

Domestic
Type	Competition	Titles	Seasons	Runners-up
Top level FMF	Liga MX	16	1965–66, 1970–71, 1975–76, 1983–84, 1984–85, Prode–1985, 1987–88, 1988–89, Ver–2002, Cla–2005, Cla–2013, Ape–2014, Ape–2018, Ape–2023, Cla–2024, Ape–2024	1959–60, 1961–62, 1963–64, 1966–67, 1971–72, 1990–91, Cla–2007, Ape–2013, Ape–2016, Ape–2019, Cla–2025
Top level FMF	Copa MX	6	1953–54, 1954–55, 1963–64, 1964–65, 1973–74, Cla–2019	1944–45, 1975–76, 1990–91
Top level FMF	Campeón de Campeones	7^{s}	1955, 1976, 1988, 1989, 2005, 2019, 2024	1954, 1964, 1965, 1966, 1971, 1974, 2015, 2025
Top level FMF	Supercopa MX	0	—	2017
Top level FMF	Supercopa de la Liga MX	1^{s}	2024	—
International
Type	Competition	Titles	Seasons	Runners-up
Intercontinental CONCACAF CONMEBOL	Copa Interamericana	2	1978, 1990	—
Continental CONCACAF	CONCACAF Champions Cup	7^{s}	1977, 1987, 1990, 1992, 2006, 2014–15, 2015–16	2021
Continental CONCACAF	CONCACAF Giants Cup	1	2001	—
Continental CONMEBOL	CONMEBOL Sudamericana	0	—	2007
Regional North America USSF–FMF	Campeones Cup	1	2024	2019

Notes

- record
- ^{s} shared record

== See also ==
- Club América (women)
- Club América Premier
