= Franco Rossano =

Mexican footballer (born 2005)

Personal information
- Full name: Franco Rossano Erchuk
- Date of birth: 27 July 2005 (age 21)
- Place of birth: Puebla, Puebla, Mexico
- Height: 1.76 m (5 ft 9 in)
- Position: Full-back

Team information
- Current team: América
- Number: 24

Youth career
- 2018–2019: BUAP
- 2019–2022: Puebla
- 2022–2025: América
- 2023–2024: → Sporting de Gijón (loan)

Senior career*
| Years | Team | Apps | (Gls) |
| 2024– | América | 11 | (0) |
| 2025–2026 | → Necaxa (loan) | 31 | (0) |

International career^{‡}
| 2023 | Mexico U19 | 2 | (0) |
| 2022– | Mexico U20 | 1 | (0) |
- * Club domestic league appearances and goals as of 21 November 2026 ‡ National team caps and goals as of 17 December 2025

Franco Rossano Erchuk (born 27 July 2005), is a Mexican professional footballer who plays as a full-back for Liga MX club América.

== Club career ==
Rossano began his career at the BUAP academy, before getting a stint in Puebla's, América's and Sporting de Gijón's. On 7 July 2024, he made his professional debut in a 1–2 loss to Atlético San Luis, being subbed in at the 85th minute.

On 1 July 2025, Rossano was loaned to Necaxa, making his debut on 13 July in a 1–3 loss to Toluca, being subbed in at the 60th minute.

== Career statistics ==
=== Club ===
As of match played on 21 November 2026

Appearances and goals by club, season and competition
| Club | Season | League | | | Cup | | Continental | | Other | | Total | |
| Club | Season | Division | Apps | Goals | Apps | Goals | Apps | Goals | Apps | Goals | Apps | Goals |
|---|---|---|---|---|---|---|---|---|---|---|---|---|
| América | 2024–25 | Liga MX | 5 | 0 | — | | — | | — | | 5 | 0 |
| América | 2026–27 | Liga MX | 6 | 0 | — | | — | | — | | 6 | 0 |
| América | Total | | 11 | 0 | — | | — | | — | | 11 | 0 |
| Necaxa (loan) | 2025–26 | Liga MX | 31 | 0 | — | | — | | 2 (Note: Appearances in Leagues Cup) | 0 | 33 | 0 |
| Career total | | | 42 | 0 | 0 | 0 | 0 | 0 | 2 | 0 | 44 | 0 |
