= Miguel Ramírez (footballer, born 2002) =

American soccer player (born 2002)

Personal information
- Full name: Miguel Ramírez Pérez
- Date of birth: June 30, 2002 (age 24)
- Place of birth: California, United States
- Height: 5 ft 6 in (1.68 m)
- Position: Midfielder

Team information
- Current team: Tlaxcala (on loan from América)
- Number: 16

Youth career
- 2018–2025: América

Senior career*
Years	Team	Apps	(Gls)
2024–2026	América	7	(0)
2025–2026	→ Puebla (loan)	16	(0)
2026–	→ Tlaxcala (loan)	0	(0)
- * Club domestic league appearances and goals as of August 28, 2026

Miguel Ramírez Pérez (born June 30, 2002), commonly known as Isco, is an American professional soccer player who plays as a midfielder for Liga de Expansión MX club Tlaxcala, on loan from Liga MX club América.

== Club career ==
Ramírez began his career at the academy of América before making his professional debut on June 30, 2024, in the Supercopa de la Liga MX against UANL, being subbed in at the 86th minute of a 2–1 win. Later, on July 12, he made his Liga MX debut in a 3–1 win against Querétaro, being subbed in at the 68th minute.

On June 11, 2025, Ramírez was loaned out to Puebla, making his debut on July 12 in a 2–3 to Atlas, playing 61 minutes.

== Career statistics ==
As of August 28, 2026

Club	Season	League			Cup		Continental		Other		Total	
Club	Season	Division	Apps	Goals	Apps	Goals	Apps	Goals	Apps	Goals	Apps	Goals
América	2024–25	Liga MX	7	0	—		—		1 (Note: One appearance in Supercopa de la Liga MX)	0	8	0
Puebla (loan)	2025–26	Liga MX	16	0	—		—		3 (Note: Appearances in Leagues Cup)	0	19	0
Career total			23	0	0	0	0	0	4	0	27	0
