= Henry Martín =

Mexican footballer (born 1992)

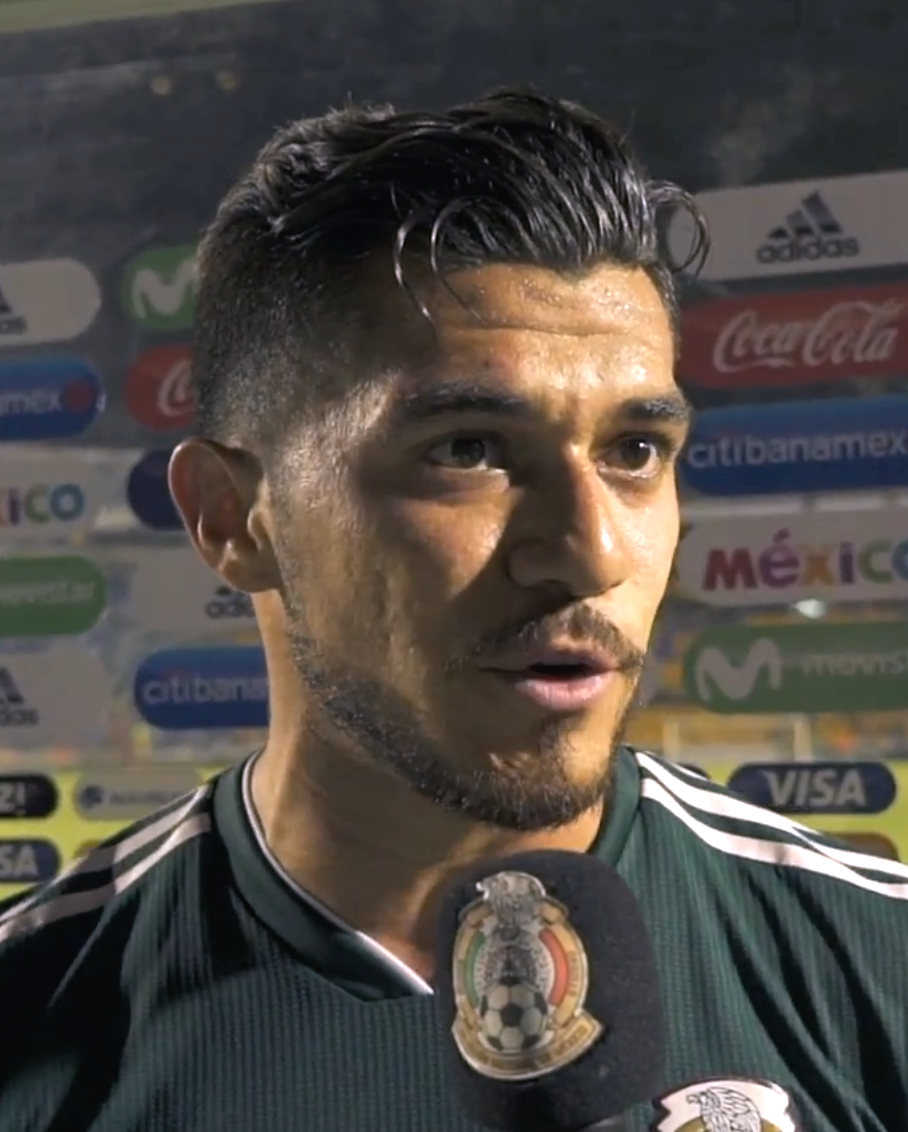
- Martín with Mexico in 2018

Personal information
- Full name: Henry Josué Martín Mex
- Date of birth: 18 November 1992 (age 34)
- Place of birth: Mérida, Yucatán, Mexico
- Height: 1.70 m (5 ft 7 in)
- Position: Forward

Team information
- Current team: América
- Number: 9

Youth career
- 2008: Itzaes

Senior career*
Years	Team	Apps	(Gls)
2013–2014	Mérida	29	(8)
2014–2017	Tijuana	66	(5)
2018–	América	284	(109)

International career^{‡}
2021	Mexico Olympic (O.P.)	6	(3)
2015–2024	Mexico	46	(10)
Medal record
Men's soccer
Representing Mexico
CONCACAF Gold Cup
Winner	2023 United States-Canada
CONCACAF Nations League
Winner	2025 United States
Runner-up	2021 United States
Runner-up	2024 United States
Third place	2023 United States
Olympic Games
Bronze medal – third place	2020 Tokyo	Team
- * Club domestic league appearances and goals as of 21 November 2026 ‡ National team caps and goals as of 19 November 2025

Henry Josué Martín Mex (born 18 November 1992) is a Mexican professional footballer who plays as a forward for and captains Liga MX club América.

== Club career ==
=== Early career ===
Martín initiated his career with Itzaes, an amateur football team from his hometown of Mérida, Yucatán. During his time there, he played in 13 matches and netted 6 goals. Soon after, he was signed by Venados. Martín made his professional debut on 13 July 2013, in a match against Delfines del Carmen, where he came on as a substitute in the last seconds of the match. On 24 August, he scored his first professional goal against Zacatepec in a 2–0 win.

=== Tijuana ===
Martín joined Club Tijuana for the Apertura 2014 season, making his Liga MX debut against América on 26 July 2014. He scored his first goal for the club three days later in a Copa MX match against Zacatepec, where Tijuana won 3–1. In March 2016, Martín faced an anterior cruciate ligament injury that kept him off the field for six months.

=== América ===
On 13 December 2017, Martín joined Club América. On 7 January 2018, he made his debut scoring in a 1–0 away win against Querétaro. On 3 February, Martín scored his first career hat-trick in a 5–1 win over Lobos BUAP.

== International career ==
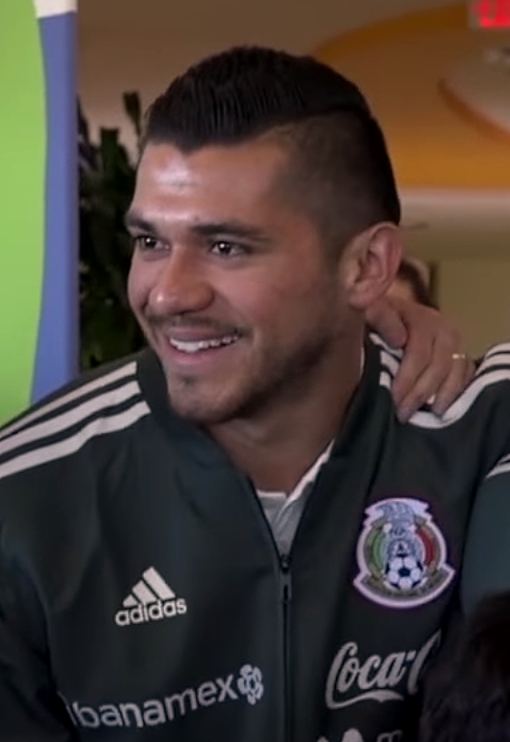
Martín in 2018

On 30 August 2015, Martín received his first call-up by interim head coach Ricardo Ferretti to replace the injured Oribe Peralta. He earned his first cap with Mexico on 4 September in a friendly match against Trinidad and Tobago, playing as starter and eventually subbed-out for Raúl Jiménez in the 59th minute of the match.

On 11 October 2018, Martín scored his first goal for Mexico in their 3–2 win over Costa Rica.

Martín was called up by Jaime Lozano as one of three over-age reinforcements for the 2020 Summer Olympics in Tokyo. He won the bronze medal with the Olympic team.

In October 2022, Martín was named in Mexico's preliminary 31-man squad for the 2022 FIFA World Cup, and in November, he was ultimately included in the final 26-man roster. In Mexico's third match at the tournament on 30 November, Martín scored a goal against Saudi Arabia, but Mexico failed to progress on goal difference.

In June 2023, Martín was named to Mexico's 23-man squad for the 2023 CONCACAF Gold Cup.

== Personal life ==
Henry's older brother, Freddy, was also a professional footballer who played as a forward.

== Career statistics ==
=== Club ===
As of match played on 21 November 2026

Appearances and goals by club, season and competition
Club	Season	League			Cup		Continental		Other		Total	
Club	Season	Division	Apps	Goals	Apps	Goals	Apps	Goals	Apps	Goals	Apps	Goals
Mérida	2013–14	Ascenso MX	29	8	6	4	—		—		35	12
Tijuana	2014–15	Liga MX	21	1	12	6	—		—		33	7
Tijuana	2015–16	Liga MX	22	3	6	0	—		—		28	3
Tijuana	2016–17	Liga MX	15	1	6	2	—		—		21	3
Tijuana	2017–18	Liga MX	8	0	4	0	—		—		12	0
Tijuana	Total		66	5	28	8	—		—		94	13
América	2017–18	Liga MX	17	5	—		6 (Note: Appearances in CONCACAF Champions Cup)	3	—		23	8
América	2018–19	Liga MX	34	6	13 (Note: Includes an appearance in Campeón de Campeones)	8	—		1 (Note: Appearance in Campeones Cup)	0	48	14
América	2019–20	Liga MX	25	10	—		1	1	—		26	11
América	2020–21	Liga MX	34	16	4 (Note: Appearances in Copa GNP por México)	1	4	1	—		42	18
América	2021–22	Liga MX	34	6	—		—		—		34	6
América	2022–23	Liga MX	42	27	2 (Note: Appearances in Copa Sky por México)	0	—		1 (Note: Appearances in Leagues Cup)	0	45	27
América	2023–24	Liga MX	36	16	—		7	4	2	1	45	21
América	2024–25	Liga MX	36	11	1 (Note: Appearance in Supercopa MX)	1	2	0	4 (Note: One appearance in Campeones Cup, three appearances and one goal in Leagues Cup)	1	43	13
América	2025–26	Liga MX	11	1	—		2	0	3	0	16	1
América	2026–27	Liga MX	15	11	—		—		5	0	20	11
América	Total		284	109	20	10	22	9	16	2	320	122
Career total			379	122	48	18	22	9	16	2	464	152

=== International ===
As of match played on 19 November 2024

Appearances and goals by national team and year
National team	Year	Apps	Goals
Mexico
Mexico	2015	1	0
Mexico	2018	4	1
Mexico	2020	3	1
Mexico	2021	8	2
Mexico	2022	13	2
Mexico	2023	12	2
Mexico	2024	5	2
Total		46	10

Scores and results list Mexico's goal tally first, score column indicates score after each Martín goal.

List of international goals scored by Henry Martín
No.	Date	Venue	Opponent	Score	Result	Competition
1	11 October 2018	Estadio Universitario, San Nicolás de los Garza, Mexico	Costa Rica	2–2	3–2	Friendly
2	30 September 2020	Estadio Azteca, Mexico City, Mexico	Guatemala	1–0	3–0	Friendly
3	30 June 2021	Nissan Stadium, Nashville, United States	Panama	3–0	3–0	Friendly
4	2 September 2021	Estadio Azteca, Mexico City, Mexico	Jamaica	2–1	2–1	2022 FIFA World Cup qualification
5	27 January 2022	Independence Park, Kingston, Jamaica	Jamaica	1–1	2–1	2022 FIFA World Cup qualification
6	30 November 2022	Lusail Iconic Stadium, Lusail, Qatar	Saudi Arabia	1–0	2–1	2022 FIFA World Cup
7	29 June 2023	State Farm Stadium, Glendale, United States	Haiti	1–0	3–1	2023 CONCACAF Gold Cup
8	12 July 2023	Allegiant Stadium, Paradise, United States	Jamaica	1–0	3–0	2023 CONCACAF Gold Cup
9	19 November 2024	Estadio Nemesio Díez, Toluca, Mexico	Honduras	2–0	4–0	2024–25 CONCACAF Nations League A
10	19 November 2024	Estadio Nemesio Díez, Toluca, Mexico	Honduras	4–0	4–0	2024–25 CONCACAF Nations League A

== Honours ==
América

- Liga MX: Apertura 2018, Apertura 2023, Clausura 2024, Apertura 2024
- Copa MX: Clausura 2019
- Campeón de Campeones: 2019, 2024
- Supercopa de la Liga MX: 2024
- Campeones Cup: 2024

Mexico Olympic

- Olympic Bronze Medal: 2020

Mexico

- CONCACAF Gold Cup: 2023
- CONCACAF Nations League: 2024–25
- CONCACAF Cup: 2015

Individual

- Copa MX Top Scorer: Clausura 2019
- Liga MX Player of the Month: October 2019
- Liga MX Balón de Oro: 2022–23
- Liga MX Best Forward: 2022–23
- Liga MX Golden Boot: Clausura 2023
- Liga MX Best XI: Clausura 2024, Apertura 2024
- Liga MX Top Assist Provider: Apertura 2024 (Shared)
- Liga MX All-Stars: 2025
