= 2025–26 Club América season =

América
2025–26 season
- President: Santiago Baños
- Manager: André Jardine
- Stadium: Estadio Ciudad de los Deportes (until March 2026); Estadio Azteca (from April 2026)
- Apertura: Regular phase: 4th Final phase: Quarter-finals
- Clausura: Regular phase: 8th Final phase: Quarter-finals
- Campeón de Campeones: Runners-up
- Leagues Cup: League phase
- CONCACAF Champions Cup: Quarter-finals
- Top goalscorer: League: Apertura: Brian Rodríguez (7); Clausura: Brian Rodríguez; Alejandro Zendejas (6 each); All: Brian Rodríguez (14)
- Highest home attendance: 46,884 v Cruz Azul (11 April 2026, Clausura)
- Lowest home attendance: 12,560 v Juárez (4 March 2026, Clausura)
- Average home league attendance: 26,321 (Note: Does not include the match against Pachuca, which was played behind closed doors.)
- Biggest win: 4–0 v Puebla (A) (20 February 2026, Clausura)
- Biggest defeat: 1–4 v UANL (H) (28 February 2026, Clausura)
| Home colours | Away colours | Third colours |

The 2025–26 Club América season was the club's 81st consecutive season in the top-flight of Mexican football. The team participated in the Liga MX, Campeón de Campeones, Leagues Cup, and the CONCACAF Champions Cup.

== Coaching staff ==
| Position | Staff |
|---|---|
| Manager | (Brazil) André Jardine |
| Assistant managers | (Brazil) Paulo Victor Gomes |
| Assistant managers | (Mexico) Raúl Lara |
| Goalkeeper coach | (Mexico) Luis Gurrola |
| Fitness coaches | (Brazil) Kako Perez |
| Fitness coaches | (Mexico) Francisco Martínez |
| Physiotherapists | (Argentina) Fernando Gilardi |
| Physiotherapists | (Mexico) Octavio Luna |
| Physiotherapists | (Mexico) Francisco Faustino |
| Team doctors | (Mexico) Alfonso Díaz |
| Team doctors | (Mexico) José Guadalupe Vázquez |
| Team doctors | (Argentina) Christian Motta |

Source: Club América

== Players ==
=== Squad information ===
| No. | Pos. | Nat. | Name | Date of birth (age) | Since | From |
Goalkeepers
| 1 | GK | (Mexico) | Luis Malagón | 2 March 1997 (age 29) | 2023 | (Mexico) Necaxa |
| 21 | GK | (Mexico) | Fernando Tapia | 17 June 2001 (age 24) | 2026 | (Mexico) UANL |
| 30 | GK | (Mexico) | Rodolfo Cota | 3 July 1987 (age 38) | 2024 | (Mexico) León |
Defenders
| 3 | DF | (Mexico) | Israel Reyes | 23 May 2000 (age 26) | 2023 | (Mexico) Puebla |
| 4 | DF | (Uruguay) | Sebastián Cáceres | 18 August 1999 (age 26) | 2020 | (Uruguay) Liverpool |
| 5 | DF | (Mexico) | Kevin Álvarez | 15 January 1999 (age 27) | 2023 | (Mexico) Pachuca |
| 14 | DF | (Mexico) | Néstor Araujo | 29 August 1991 (age 34) | 2022 | (Spain) Celta de Vigo |
| 15 | DF | (United States) | Ralph Orquin | 13 April 2003 (age 23) | 2023 | Academy |
| 18 | DF | (Mexico) | Aarón Mejía | 6 June 2001 (age 24) | 2026 | (Mexico) Tijuana |
| 22 | DF | (Uruguay) | Thiago Espinosa | 9 November 2004 (age 21) | 2026 | (Uruguay) Racing |
| 26 | DF | (Colombia) | Cristian Borja | 18 February 1993 (age 33) | 2024 | (Portugal) Braga |
| 29 | DF | (Mexico) | Ramón Juárez | 9 May 2001 (age 25) | 2019 | Academy |
| 32 | DF | (Mexico) | Miguel Vásquez | 7 February 2004 (age 22) | 2022 | Academy |
Midfielders
| 6 | MF | (Mexico) | Jonathan dos Santos | 26 April 1990 (age 36) | 2022 | Free agent |
| 10 | MF | (United States) | Alejandro Zendejas | 7 February 1998 (age 28) | 2022 | (Mexico) Necaxa |
| 12 | MF | (Mexico) | Isaías Violante | 20 October 2003 (age 22) | 2025 | (Mexico) Toluca |
| 13 | MF | (Mexico) | Alan Cervantes | 17 January 1998 (age 28) | 2024 | (Mexico) Santos Laguna |
| 17 | MF | (Brazil) | Rodrigo Dourado | 17 June 1994 (age 31) | 2026 | (Mexico) Atlético San Luis |
| 20 | MF | (Mexico) | Alexis Gutiérrez | 26 February 2000 (age 26) | 2025 | (Mexico) Cruz Azul |
| 23 | MF | (Brazil) | Raphael Veiga | 19 June 1995 (age 30) | 2026 | (Brazil) Palmeiras |
| 28 | MF | (Mexico) | Érick Sánchez | 27 September 1999 (age 26) | 2024 | (Mexico) Pachuca |
| 34 | MF | (Mexico) | Dagoberto Espinoza | 17 April 2004 (age 22) | 2024 | Academy |
| 35 | MF | (Mexico) | Santiago Naveda | 16 April 2001 (age 25) | 2020 | Academy |
| 45 | MF | (Brazil) | Lima | 11 June 1996 (age 29) | 2026 | (Brazil) Fluminense |
Forwards
| 7 | FW | (Uruguay) | Brian Rodríguez | 20 May 2000 (age 26) | 2022 | (United States) LAFC |
| 9 | FW | (Mexico) | Henry Martín | 18 September 1992 (age 33) | 2018 | (Mexico) Tijuana |
| 11 | FW | (Chile) | Víctor Dávila | 4 November 1997 (age 28) | 2024 | (Russia) CSKA Moscow |
| 19 | FW | (Colombia) | Raúl Zúñiga | 13 July 1994 (age 31) | 2025 | (Mexico) Tijuana |
| 33 | FW | (Mexico) | Patricio Salas | 17 February 2004 (age 22) | 2023 | Academy |

Players and squad numbers last updated on 10 February 2026.
Note: Flags indicate national team as has been defined under FIFA eligibility rules. Players may hold more than one non-FIFA nationality.

== Transfers ==
=== Summer ===
==== In ====
| No. | Pos. | Player | Transfer from | Fee | Date | Source |
|---|---|---|---|---|---|---|
| 35 | MF | (Mexico) Santiago Naveda | (Mexico) Santos Laguna | End of loan | 1 June 2025 | |
| 15 | DF | (United States) Ralph Orquin | (Mexico) Juárez | End of loan | 1 June 2025 | |
| 20 | MF | (Mexico) Alexis Gutiérrez | (Mexico) Cruz Azul | $5,000,000 | 25 June 2025 | |
| 12 | MF | (Mexico) Isaías Violante | (Mexico) Toluca | $4,000,000 | 4 July 2025 | |
| 19 | FW | (Colombia) Raúl Zúñiga | (Mexico) Tijuana | $3,000,000 | 13 July 2025 | |
| 24 | MF | (Netherlands) Javairô Dilrosun | (United States) Los Angeles FC | End of loan | 26 July 2025 | |
| 97 | FW | (France) Allan Saint-Maximin | (Saudi Arabia) Al-Ahli | $11,500,000 | 12 August 2025 | |
| Total | | | | $23.5 million | | |

==== Out ====
| No. | Pos. | Player | Transfer to | Fee | Date | Source |
|---|---|---|---|---|---|---|
| 35 | FW | (Mexico) Esteban Lozano | (Mexico) Puebla | On loan | 11 June 2025 | |
| 42 | MF | (United States) Miguel Ramírez | (Mexico) Puebla | On loan | 11 June 2025 | |
| 209 | MF | (United States) Wálter Portales | (Mexico) Puebla | On loan | 11 June 2025 | |
| 24 | MF | (Netherlands) Javairô Dilrosun | (United States) Los Angeles FC | On loan | 11 June 2025 | |
| 12 | GK | (Mexico) Jonathan Estrada | (Mexico) Atlético La Paz | End of loan | 12 June 2025 | |
| 10 | MF | (Chile) Diego Valdés | (Argentina) Vélez Sarsfield | $3,500,000 | 21 June 2025 | |
| 18 | DF | (Mexico) Cristian Calderón | (Mexico) Necaxa | On loan | 1 July 2025 | |
| 193 | DF | (Mexico) Franco Rossano | (Mexico) Necaxa | On loan | 1 July 2025 | |
| 23 | DF | (Mexico) Emilio Lara | (Mexico) Necaxa | On loan | 1 July 2025 | |
| Total | | | | $3.5 million | | |

=== Winter ===
==== In ====
| No. | Pos. | Player | Transfer from | Fee | Date | Source |
|---|---|---|---|---|---|---|
| 17 | MF | (Brazil) Rodrigo Dourado | (Mexico) Atlético San Luis | $1,000,000 | 4 January 2026 | |
| 21 | GK | (Mexico) Fernando Tapia | (Mexico) UANL | Undisclosed | 7 January 2026 | |
| 18 | DF | (Mexico) Aarón Mejía | (Mexico) Tijuana | Undisclosed | 7 January 2026 | |
| 23 | MF | (Brazil) Raphael Veiga | (Brazil) Palmeiras | On loan | 3 February 2026 | |
| 45 | MF | (Brazil) Lima | (Brazil) Fluminense | On loan | 10 February 2026 | |
| 22 | DF | (Uruguay) Thiago Espinosa | (Uruguay) Racing | On loan | 10 February 2026 | |
| Total | | | | $1.0 million | | |

==== Out ====
| No. | Pos. | Player | Transfer to | Fee | Date | Source |
|---|---|---|---|---|---|---|
| 24 | MF | (Netherlands) Javairô Dilrosun | Released (Note: Eventually joined Al Sadd) | | 13 January 2026 | |
| 97 | FW | (France) Allan Saint-Maximin | Released (Note: Eventually joined Lens) | | 31 January 2026 | |
| 8 | MF | (Spain) Álvaro Fidalgo | (Spain) Real Betis | $1,500,000 | 1 February 2026 | |
| 31 | DF | (Chile) Igor Lichnovsky | (Turkey) Fatih Karagümrük | Undisclosed | 6 February 2026 | |
| 27 | FW | (Uruguay) Rodrigo Aguirre | (Mexico) UANL | Undisclosed | 6 February 2026 | |
| Total | | | | $1.5 million | | |

=== Overall transfer activity ===
==== Expenditure ====
Summer 2025: ▼$23,500,000

Winter 2026: ▼$1,000,000

Total: ▼$24,500,000

==== Income ====
Summer 2025: ▲$3,500,000

Winter 2026: ▲$1,500,000

Total: ▲$5,000,000

==== Net totals ====
Summer 2025: ▼$20,000,000

Winter 2026: ▲$500,000

Total: ▼$19,500,000

== Pre-season and friendlies ==
On 22 June 2025, Cancún announced that they would host América in celebration of the club’s five-year anniversary. Three days later, on 25 June, América announced that they would host Puebla in a friendly match ahead of their season. On 11 July, a third friendly was announced with América facing off D.C. United at Audi Field. On 28 August, América announced a fourth friendly against their rivals, Guadalajara, to be played in Glendale.

Win Draw Loss Fixtures

| 27 June 2025 Friendly | Cancún (Mexico) | 1–1 | (Mexico) América | Cancún |
| 20:00 EST | J. Rodríguez 86' | Report | Zendejas 10' | Stadium: Estadio Andrés Quintana Roo |

| 2 July 2025 Friendly | América (Mexico) | 2–1 | (Mexico) Puebla | Mexico City |
| 17:30 CST | Arriaga 77'; Álvarez 83' | Report | Rey 61' | Stadium: Estadio Ciudad de los Deportes; Attendance: 25,894; Referee: Jorge Camacho Peregrina |

| 6 September 2025 Friendly | D.C. United (United States) | 3–1 | (Mexico) América | Washington, D.C., United States |
| 18:30 EDT | Peglow 47'; Clark 54'; Pirani 90+3' | Report | MacNaughton 53' (o.g.) | Stadium: Audi Field; Referee: Sergii Demianchuk (United States) |

| 11 October 2025 Friendly | América (Mexico) | 1–1 | (Mexico) Guadalajara | Glendale, United States |
| 20:00 MST | Vázquez (yellow card) 52'; Dávila 61'; Violante (yellow card) 63'; Lichnovsky (yellow card) 67' | Report | Hernández 3'; Pulido (yellow card) 78'; D. Aguirre (yellow card) 82'; F. González (yellow card) 90+1' | Stadium: State Farm Stadium |

| 15 November 2025 Friendly | LA Galaxy (United States) | 2–2 | (Mexico) América | Carson, United States |
| 18:30 PST | Ramirez 20'; Pec 42'; Parente (yellow card) 57' | Report | Dávila 13', 40'; Zendejas (yellow card) 60' | Stadium: Dignity Health Sports Park; Attendance: 16,714; Referee: Elton Garcia |

| 30 December 2025 Friendly | América (Mexico) | 1–0 | (Mexico) Puebla | Mexico City |
| 12:00 CST | Salas | Report | | Stadium: Estadio Ciudad de los Deportes; Attendance: 0 (behind closed doors) |

| 28 March 2026 Golden Clash | América (Mexico) | 1–1 | (Mexico) UANL | Fayetteville, United States |
| 17:00 CDT | Zúñiga 58' | Report | Loroña (yellow card) 15'; Brunetta 84' | Stadium: Donald W. Reynolds Razorback Stadium |

== Competitions ==
=== Overview ===
| Competition | First match | Last match | Starting round | Final position | Record | | | | | | | |
| Competition | First match | Last match | Starting round | Final position | Pld | W | D | L | GF | GA | GD | Win % |
|---|---|---|---|---|---|---|---|---|---|---|---|---|
| Apertura | 11 July 2025 | 29 November 2025 | Matchday 1 | Quarter-finals | 19 | 11 | 4 | 4 | 35 | 21 | +14 | 57.89 |
| Clausura | 9 January 2026 | 10 May 2026 | Matchday 1 | Quarter-finals | 19 | 7 | 6 | 6 | 26 | 23 | +3 | 36.84 |
| Leagues Cup | 30 July 2025 | 6 August 2025 | League phase | League phase | 3 | 0 | 3 | 0 | 6 | 6 | +0 | 0.00 |
| CONCACAF Champions Cup | 3 February 2026 | 14 April 2026 | Round one | Quarter-finals | 6 | 2 | 3 | 1 | 4 | 3 | +1 | 33.33 |
| Campeón de Campeones | 20 July 2025 | | Final | Runners-up | 1 | 0 | 0 | 1 | 1 | 3 | −2 | 0.00 |
| Total | | | | | 48 | 20 | 16 | 12 | 72 | 56 | +16 | 41.67 |

Source: Competitions

==== Apertura 2025 ====
| Overall | | | | | | | | Home | | | | | | Away | | | | | |
| Pld | W | D | L | GF | GA | GD | Pts | W | D | L | GF | GA | GD | W | D | L | GF | GA | GD |
|---|---|---|---|---|---|---|---|---|---|---|---|---|---|---|---|---|---|---|---|
| 19 | 11 | 4 | 4 | 35 | 21 | +14 | 37 | 8 | 0 | 1 | 20 | 6 | +14 | 3 | 4 | 3 | 15 | 15 | 0 |

Source: Liga MX

==== Clausura 2026 ====
| Overall | | | | | | | | Home | | | | | | Away | | | | | |
| Pld | W | D | L | GF | GA | GD | Pts | W | D | L | GF | GA | GD | W | D | L | GF | GA | GD |
|---|---|---|---|---|---|---|---|---|---|---|---|---|---|---|---|---|---|---|---|
| 19 | 7 | 6 | 6 | 26 | 23 | +3 | 27 | 4 | 2 | 4 | 13 | 14 | −1 | 3 | 4 | 2 | 13 | 9 | +4 |

Source: Liga MX

== Apertura 2025 ==
=== League table ===
| Pos | Team | Pld | W | D | L | GF | GA | GD | Pts | Qualification |
|---|---|---|---|---|---|---|---|---|---|---|
| 2 | UANL | 17 | 10 | 6 | 1 | 35 | 16 | +19 | 36 | Qualification for the quarter–finals (Note: The first six places in the table will qualify for the Liguilla quarter-finals.) |
| 3 | Cruz Azul | 17 | 10 | 5 | 2 | 32 | 20 | +12 | 35 | Qualification for the quarter–finals |
| 4 | América | 17 | 10 | 4 | 3 | 33 | 18 | +15 | 34 | Qualification for the quarter–finals |
| 5 | Monterrey | 17 | 9 | 4 | 4 | 33 | 29 | +4 | 31 | Qualification for the quarter–finals |
| 6 | Guadalajara | 17 | 9 | 2 | 6 | 29 | 22 | +7 | 29 | Qualification for the quarter–finals |

Source: Liga MX
Rules for classification: 1) Points; 2) Goal difference; 3) Number of goals scored; 4) Head-to-head results between tied teams; 5) Number of goals scored away; 6) Highest relegation coefficient; 7) Fair Play points

==== Results by matchday ====
| Round | 1 | 2 | 3 | 4 | 5 | 6 | 7 | 8 | 9 | 10 | 11 | 12 | 13 | 14 | 15 | 16 | 17 |
|---|---|---|---|---|---|---|---|---|---|---|---|---|---|---|---|---|---|
| Ground | A | H | A | H | A | A | H | H | A | A | H | H | A | H | A | H | A |
| Result | D | W | D | W | W | W | W | L | D | W | W | W | L | W | D | W | L |
| Position | 7 | 3 | 6 | 6 | 4 | 2 | 2 | 3 | 4 | 4 | 3 | 2 | 3 | 2 | 4 | 3 | 4 |
| Points | 1 | 4 | 5 | 8 | 11 | 14 | 17 | 17 | 18 | 21 | 24 | 27 | 27 | 30 | 31 | 34 | 34 |

Source: Liga MX
A = Away; H = Home; W = Win; D = Draw; L = Loss; P = Postponed

=== Regular phase ===
The league fixtures were announced on 4 June 2025.

| 11 July 2025 1 | Juárez | 1–1 | América | Ciudad Juárez |
| 21:00 CT | Castilho (yellow card) 72'; Pizarro 80' | Report | Cáceres (yellow card) 1'; Zendejas 39'; Sánchez (red card) 70' | Stadium: Estadio Olímpico Benito Juárez; Attendance: 18,098; Referee: Ismael López Peñuelas |

| 16 July 2025 2 | América | 3–1 | Tijuana | Mexico City |
| 19:00 CT | B. Rodríguez 35' (pen.), (yellow card) 51', 90'; Cáceres (yellow card) 47'; Zendejas (yellow card) 48'; Aguirre 64' | Report | Árciga 56' | Stadium: Estadio Ciudad de los Deportes; Attendance: 20,398; Referee: Marco Ortiz Nava |
Note: The match was interrupted at 20:30 CST in the 64th minute due to adverse weather conditions. The match was resumed at 21:10 CST.

| 26 July 2025 3 | Necaxa | 1–1 | América | Aguascalientes |
| 21:00 CT | Monreal (yellow card) 1'; Cambindo 44'; Andrade (yellow card) 88'; J. Rodríguez (yellow card) 90+7' | Report | Zúñiga 27'; Borja (yellow card) 46'; Malagón (yellow card) 58'; B. Rodríguez (yellow card) 86' | Stadium: Estadio Victoria; Attendance: 20,586; Referee: Jesús López Valle |

| 9 August 2025 4 | América | 1–0 | Querétaro | Mexico City |
| 20:45 CT | Espinoza 6'; Borja (yellow card) 17'; Martín (penalty missed) 42' | Report | J. Robles (yellow card) 11'; Mendoza (yellow card) 27'; Barrera (yellow card) 48'; Armenta (yellow card) 55' | Stadium: Estadio Ciudad de los Deportes; Attendance: 23,701; Referee: Adonai Escobedo González |
Note: Fixture was originally scheduled for 19:00, but was moved due to adverse weather conditions.

| 16 August 2025 5 | UANL | 1–3 | América | San Nicolás de los Garza |
| 19:00 CT | Brunetta 5'; Correa (yellow card) 15'; Herrera (yellow card) 45'; Rômulo (yellow card) 54' | Report | Sánchez 41', 58'; Cáceres (yellow card) 45+2'; Zendejas (yellow card) 60'; Aguirre (yellow card) 66'; Guzmán 69' (o.g.); Malagón (yellow card) 87' | Stadium: Estadio Universitario; Attendance: 41,615; Referee: César Arturo Ramos |

| 24 August 2025 6 | Atlas | 2–4 | América | Guadalajara |
| 20:00 CT | Đurđević (yellow card) 20'; Del Prete 45+1'; D. González 49'; Rocha (yellow card) 63', (red card) 82' | Report | Rodríguez 21' (pen.); Espinoza (yellow card) 31'; Borja (yellow card) 43'; Fidalgo 74'; Zendejas (yellow card) 78'; Saint-Maximin 89'; Dávila (penalty missed) 90+6', 90+6' | Stadium: Estadio Jalisco; Attendance: 35,588; Referee: Marco Ortíz Nava |
Note: Fixture was originally scheduled for 19:00, but was moved due to adverse weather conditions.

| 30 August 2025 7 | América | 2–0 | Pachuca | Mexico City |
| 21:05 CT | Lichnovsky 21'; Sánchez (yellow card) 65'; Saint-Maximin 71' | Report | Barreto (yellow card) 34'; Aceves (yellow card) 74' | Stadium: Estadio Ciudad de los Deportes; Attendance: 0 (Note: América played their match against Pachuca behind closed doors due to a municipal order citing public safety concerns following an América Femenil game.); Referee: Ismael López Peñuelas |

| 13 September 2025 8 | América | 1–2 | Guadalajara | Mexico City |
| 20:15 CT | dos Santos (yellow card) 79'; Zendejas (yellow card) 80', (goal) 90+9'; Sánchez (yellow card) 90+4' | Report | Alvarado 63'; A. González 88'; Ledezma (yellow card) 90+4'; Gutiérrez (yellow card) 90+7' | Stadium: Estadio Ciudad de los Deportes; Attendance: 30,247; Referee: Óscar Mejía García |

| 20 September 2025 9 | Monterrey | 2–2 | América | Guadalupe |
| 20:05 CT | Ambríz 17'; Canales 44' | Report | Gutiérrez (yellow card) 59'; R. Aguirre 82'; Juárez 89' | Stadium: Estadio BBVA; Attendance: 50,910; Referee: Víctor Cáceres Hernández |

| 24 September 2025 10 | Atlético San Luis | 0–1 | América | San Luis Potosí |
| 20:00 CT | Salles-Lamonge (yellow card) 83' | Report | Juárez (yellow card) 21'; Cáceres (yellow card) 47'; Saint-Maximin (yellow card) 83'; Zendejas 89' | Stadium: Estadio Alfonso Lastras; Attendance: 22,841; Referee: Fernando Hernández Gómez |

| 27 September 2025 11 | América | 4–1 | UNAM | Mexico City |
| 20:05 CT | Fidalgo (yellow card) 41'; Angulo 55' (o.g.); Zúñiga 59'; Saint-Maximin (yellow card) 68'; Zendejas 73', 83' (pen.) | Report | Carrasquilla (yellow card) 16'; Ruvalcaba 34', (yellow card) 41'; Duarte (yellow card) 76'; Silva (yellow card) 88' | Stadium: Estadio Ciudad de los Deportes; Attendance: 26,387; Referee: César Arturo Ramos |

| 4 October 2025 12 | América | 3–0 | Santos Laguna | Mexico City |
| 20:05 CT | Aguirre 38'; Rodríguez 62'; Cervantes 71'; Dávila (yellow card) 84' | Report | Ortega (yellow card) 12'; Sordo (yellow card) 78' | Stadium: Estadio Ciudad de los Deportes; Attendance: 21,870; Referee: Maximiliano Quintero Hernández |

| 18 October 2025 13 | Cruz Azul | 2–1 | América | Mexico City |
| 20:05 CT | Fernández 31'; Rodarte (yellow card) 40'; Rivero 67', (yellow card) 76' | Report | B. Rodríguez 31'; Cáceres (yellow card) 51' | Stadium: Estadio Olímpico Universitario; Attendance: 40,237; Referee: Jesús Rafael López Valle |

| 21 October 2025 14 | América | 2–1 | Puebla | Mexico City |
| 18:00 CT | Rodríguez 67' (pen.); Cervantes (yellow card) 69'; Juárez 90+8' | Report | de la Rosa (yellow card) 31'; Gómez 52', (yellow card) 53'; Castillo (red card) 90+2' | Stadium: Estadio Ciudad de los Deportes; Attendance: 18,130; Referee: Martín Molina Astorga |

| 24 October 2025 15 | Mazatlán | 2–2 | América | Mazatlán |
| 20:00 PT | Colula 17'; M. Zaleta 31', (yellow card) 61'; R. Gutiérrez (yellow card) 76'; S. Fierro (yellow card) 88' | Report | Álvarez 9'; B. Rodríguez 89'; dos Santos (yellow card) 90+1' | Stadium: Estadio de Mazatlán; Attendance: 18,660; Referee: Guillermo Pacheco Larios |

| 1 November 2025 16 | América | 2–0 | León | Mexico City |
| 20:05 CT | Saint-Maximin 58'; Aguirre 84'; Malagón (yellow card) 90+4' | Report | Ramírez (yellow card) 30'; Alvarado (yellow card) 75' | Stadium: Estadio Ciudad de los Deportes; Attendance: 20,029; Referee: Víctor Cáceres Hernández |

| 8 November 2025 17 | Toluca | 2–0 | América | Toluca |
| 17:00 CT | Pereira (yellow card) 38'; Paulinho 40'; Helinho 56' (pen.) | Report | Saint-Maximin (yellow card) 38'; dos Santos (yellow card) 90+3' | Stadium: Estadio Nemesio Díez; Attendance: 27,273; Referee: Luis Enrique Santander |

==== Goalscorers ====
| Position | Nation | Name | Goals scored |
|---|---|---|---|
| 1. | (Uruguay) | Brian Rodríguez | 7 |
| 2. | (United States) | Alejandro Zendejas | 5 |
| 3. | (Uruguay) | Rodrigo Aguirre | 4 |
| 4. | (France) | Allan Saint-Maximin | 3 |
| 5. | (Mexico) | Ramón Juárez | 2 |
| 5. | (Mexico) | Érick Sánchez | 2 |
| 5. | (Colombia) | Raúl Zúñiga | 2 |
| 6. | (Mexico) | Kevin Álvarez | 1 |
| 6. | (Mexico) | Alan Cervantes | 1 |
| 6. | (Chile) | Víctor Dávila | 1 |
| 6. | (Mexico) | Dagoberto Espinoza | 1 |
| 6. | (Spain) | Álvaro Fidalgo | 1 |
| 6. | (Chile) | Igor Lichnovsky | 1 |
| 6. | | Own goal(s) | 2 |
| Total | | | 33 |

=== Final phase ===
==== Quarter-finals ====
| 26 November 2025 First leg | Monterrey | 2–0 | América | Guadalupe |
| 21:05 CT | Corona (yellow card) 16'; Chávez (yellow card) 38'; Canales 45'; Ambríz 70'; Arteaga (yellow card) 89'; Fimbres (yellow card) 90+5' | Report | Lichnovsky (yellow card) 27'; Aguirre (yellow card) 62'; Zúñiga (yellow card) 75'; Álvarez (yellow card) 90+3' | Stadium: Estadio BBVA; Attendance: 43,688; Referee: Jesús López Valle |

| 29 November 2025 Second leg | América | 2–1 (2–3 agg.) | Monterrey | Mexico City |
| 17:00 CT | Zendejas 30'; I. Reyes (yellow card) 54'; Zúñiga 59', (yellow card) 60'; Violante (yellow card) 61' | Report | Ramos (yellow card) 62'; J. Rodríguez (yellow card) 79' (yellow-red card) 84'; Medina (yellow card) 79'; L. Reyes (yellow card) 88'; Berterame 90+3' | Stadium: Estadio Ciudad de los Deportes; Attendance: 30,681; Referee: César Arturo Ramos |

==== Goalscorers ====
| Position | Nation | Name | Goals scored |
|---|---|---|---|
| 1. | (United States) | Alejandro Zendejas | 1 |
| 1. | (Colombia) | Raúl Zúñiga | 1 |
| Total | | | 2 |

== Clausura 2026 ==
=== League table ===
| Pos | Team | Pld | W | D | L | GF | GA | GD | Pts | Qualification |
|---|---|---|---|---|---|---|---|---|---|---|
| 6 | Atlas | 17 | 7 | 5 | 5 | 16 | 18 | −2 | 26 | Qualification for the quarter–finals (Note: The first eight places in the table will qualify for the Liguilla quarter-finals.) |
| 7 | UANL | 17 | 7 | 4 | 6 | 28 | 18 | +10 | 25 | Qualification for the quarter–finals |
| 8 | América | 17 | 7 | 4 | 6 | 20 | 17 | +3 | 25 | Qualification for the quarter–finals |
| 9 | Tijuana | 17 | 5 | 8 | 4 | 19 | 17 | +2 | 23 | |
| 10 | León | 17 | 7 | 1 | 9 | 22 | 32 | −10 | 22 | |

Source: Liga MX
Rules for classification: 1) Points; 2) Goal difference; 3) Number of goals scored; 4) Head-to-head results between tied teams; 5) Number of goals scored away; 6) Highest relegation coefficient; 7) Fair Play points

==== Results by matchday ====
| Round | 1 | 2 | 3 | 4 | 5 | 6 | 7 | 8 | 9 | 10 | 11 | 12 | 13 | 14 | 15 | 16 | 17 |
|---|---|---|---|---|---|---|---|---|---|---|---|---|---|---|---|---|---|
| Ground | A | H | A | H | H | A | A | H | H | A | H | A | A | H | H | A | H |
| Result | D | L | D | W | W | L | W | L | L | W | W | L | D | D | W | W | L |
| Position | 8 | 16 | 15 | 9 | 8 | 10 | 7 | 8 | 9 | 8 | 7 | 8 | 6 | 7 | 6 | 6 | 8 |
| Points | 1 | 1 | 2 | 5 | 8 | 8 | 11 | 11 | 11 | 14 | 17 | 17 | 18 | 19 | 22 | 25 | 25 |

Source: Liga MX
A = Away; H = Home; W = Win; D = Draw; L = Loss; P = Postponed

=== Regular phase ===
The league fixtures were announced on 1 December 2025.

| 9 January 2026 1 | Tijuana | 0–0 | América | Tijuana |
| 19:00 PT | | Report | Reyes (yellow card) 67'; Salas (yellow card) 82' | Stadium: Estadio Caliente; Attendance: 28,833; Referee: Ismael López Peñuelas |

| 14 January 2026 2 | América | 0–2 | Atlético San Luis | Mexico City |
| 19:00 CT | Juárez (red card) 20'; Dourado (yellow card) 59' | Report | Sanabria 52'; João Pedro 67' | Stadium: Estadio Ciudad de los Deportes; Attendance: 15,331; Referee: Vicente Jassiel Reynoso Arce |

| 18 January 2026 3 | Pachuca | 0–0 | América | Pachuca |
| 19:00 CT | Rivera (yellow card) 64'; Mozo (yellow card) 74'; Pedraza (yellow card) 88' | Report | Dourado (yellow card) 90+2' | Stadium: Estadio Hidalgo; Attendance: 13,403; Referee: Luis Enrique Santander |

| 31 January 2026 4 | América | 2–0 | Necaxa | Mexico City |
| 16:00 CT | Sánchez (yellow card) 30'; Rodríguez 36'; Dávila 39' | Report | F. Gutiérrez (yellow card) 12' (yellow-red card) 45'; Rosero (yellow card) 23' | Stadium: Estadio Ciudad de los Deportes; Attendance: 26,544; Referee: Ismael López Peñuelas |
Note: Fixture was originally scheduled for 21:00 CST kick-off, but was moved to 16:00 CST due to an event being held at the Plaza México.

| 7 February 2026 5 | América | 1–0 | Monterrey | Mexico City |
| 21:00 CT | Zendejas 65'; Dávila (yellow card) 90+3' | Report | Ocampos (yellow card) 17'; Corona (yellow card) 78'; Canales (yellow card) 89' | Stadium: Estadio Ciudad de los Deportes; Attendance: 23,939; Referee: Óscar Mejía García |

| 14 February 2026 6 | Guadalajara | 1–0 | América | Zapopan |
| 21:07 CT | A. González 41'; Ledezma (yellow card) 63'; F. González (yellow card) 71'; Govea (yellow card) 79'; Rangel (yellow card) 83' | Report | Rodríguez (yellow card) 35'; Veiga (yellow card) 61' | Stadium: Estadio Akron; Attendance: 43,078; Referee: César Arturo Ramos |

| 20 February 2026 7 | Puebla | 0–4 | América | Puebla |
| 21:06 CT | Guerra (yellow card) 52' | Report | Veiga 43'; Mejía (yellow card) 49'; Violante 61'; Dávila 78'; Zúñiga 87' | Stadium: Estadio Cuauhtémoc; Attendance: 37,204; Referee: Katia Itzel García |

| 28 February 2026 8 | América | 1–4 | UANL | Mexico City |
| 21:00 CT | Zúñiga (yellow card) 63'; Douardo (yellow card) 64'; B. Rodríguez 69', (yellow card) 82'; Cáceres (yellow card) 83'; Lima (red card) 87' | Report | Brunetta 4' (pen.), 90+1'; Araújo (yellow card) 14'; Angulo 23'; Lainez (yellow card) 32'; Correa 70'; Gorriarán (yellow card) 72' | Stadium: Estadio Ciudad de los Deportes; Attendance: 26,410; Referee: Jorge Camacho Peregrina |

| 4 March 2026 9 | América | 1–2 | Juárez | Mexico City |
| 21:00 CT | Veiga (yellow card) 45+2'; Espinosa (yellow card) 55'; Zendejas 69'; Salas (yellow card) 72'; Mejía (yellow card) 76'; Dourado (yellow card) 72' | Report | Torres 5', (yellow card) 19'; Martínez (yellow card) 26'; Pizarro (yellow card) 53'; J. Rodríguez (yellow card) 76'; Castilho 90+3' | Stadium: Estadio Ciudad de los Deportes; Attendance: 12,560; Referee: Maximiliano Quintero Hernández |

| 7 March 2026 10 | Querétaro | 1–2 | América | Querétaro |
| 17:00 CT | Adriano (yellow card) 12'; Ávila 45'; L. Rodríguez (yellow card) 86' | Report | B. Rodríguez 21'; Salas 62'; Cota (yellow card) 90+2' | Stadium: Estadio Corregidora; Attendance: 29,388; Referee: Víctor Cáceres Hernández |
Note: Fixture was originally scheduled for 8 March, but was moved due to logistical reasons.

| 15 March 2026 11 | América | 2–0 | Mazatlán | Mexico City |
| 19:00 CT | B. Rodríguez (penalty missed) 8'; Veiga 43'; Lima 81'; Juárez (yellow card) 90+4' | Report | Merolla (yellow card) 65'; S. Santos (yellow card) 80' | Stadium: Estadio Ciudad de los Deportes; Attendance: 24,786; Referee: Karen Hernández Andrade |

| 21 March 2026 12 | UNAM | 1–0 | América | Mexico City |
| 21:00 CT | Vite (yellow card) 30'; Angulo (yellow card) 55'; Martínez (yellow card) 67'; Morales 90+5' (pen.) | Report | Borja (yellow card) 37'; Cáceres (yellow card) 54'; Mejía (yellow card) 74' | Stadium: Estadio Olímpico Universitario; Attendance: 42,610; Referee: César Arturo Ramos |

| 4 April 2026 13 | Santos Laguna | 1–1 | América | Torreón |
| 21:00 CT | Güémez (yellow card) 45'; Di Yorio (yellow card) 53'; K. Picón (red card) 78'; Dájome 83'; Balanta (yellow card) 90+2' | Report | Gutiérrez 80' | Stadium: Estadio Corona; Attendance: 23,258; Referee: Fernando Hernández Gómez |

| 11 April 2026 14 | América | 1–1 | Cruz Azul | Mexico City |
| 21:00 CT | Salas 17' | Report | Piovi (yellow card) 20'; Campos 45+3' | Stadium: Estadio Azteca; Attendance: 46,884; Referee: Óscar Mejía García |

| 18 April 2026 15 | América | 2–1 | Toluca | Mexico City |
| 21:10 CT | Vázquez (yellow card) 19'; Rodríguez 43', 50'; Violante (yellow card) 52' | Report | Vázquez 53' (o.g.); Gallardo (yellow card) 73'; Helinho (red card) 90+7' | Stadium: Estadio Azteca; Attendance: 42,041; Referee: Ismael López Peñuelas |

| 21 April 2026 16 | León | 2–3 | América | León |
| 21:06 CT | Cambindo 37'; Gauthier (yellow card) 42'; Beltrán 45+3'; Vallejo (yellow card) 45+5' | Report | B. Rodríguez 3'; Sánchez 12'; Zendejas 77' (pen.) | Stadium: Estadio León; Attendance: 26,668; Referee: César Arturo Ramos |

| 25 April 2026 17 | América | 0–1 | Atlas | Mexico City |
| 21:20 CT | Veiga (penalty missed) 26'; Reyes (yellow card) 54' | Report | Schlegel (yellow card) 45+5'; V. Ríos (yellow card) 78'; A. González 90+4' | Stadium: Estadio Azteca; Attendance: 37,516; Referee: Víctor Cáceres Hernández |

==== Goalscorers ====
| Position | Nation | Name | Goals scored |
|---|---|---|---|
| 1. | (Uruguay) | Brian Rodríguez | 6 |
| 2. | (United States) | Alejandro Zendejas | 3 |
| 3. | (Chile) | Víctor Dávila | 2 |
| 3. | (Mexico) | Patricio Salas | 2 |
| 3. | (Brazil) | Raphael Veiga | 2 |
| 4. | (Mexico) | Alexis Gutiérrez | 1 |
| 4. | (Brazil) | Lima | 1 |
| 4. | (Mexico) | Érick Sánchez | 1 |
| 4. | (Mexico) | Isaías Violante | 1 |
| 4. | (Colombia) | Raúl Zúñiga | 1 |
| Total | | | 20 |

=== Final phase ===
==== Quarter-finals ====
| 3 May 2026 First leg | América | 3–3 | UNAM | Mexico City |
| 17:00 CT | Violante 13', (yellow card) 59'; Martín 78' (pen.); Zendejas 85' (pen.) | Report | Juninho 5'; Antuna 44'; Carrillo 52'; López (yellow card) 66' | Stadium: Estadio Azteca; Referee: Luis Enrique Santander |

| 10 May 2026 Second leg | UNAM | 3–3 (6 (s)–6 agg.) | América | Mexico City |
| 19:15 CT | Duarte 3'; Nathan 13'; Carillo 23'; Juninho (yellow card) 45+10'; Angulo (yellow card) 80'; Carrasquilla (yellow card) 85' | Report | Salas 30'; Zendejas 40' (pen.), 61'; Martín (penalty missed) 87’; Araujo (yellow card) 90+5' | Stadium: Estadio Olímpico Universitario; Referee: César Arturo Ramos |

==== Goalscorers ====
| Position | Nation | Name | Goals scored |
|---|---|---|---|
| 1. | (United States) | Alejandro Zendejas | 3 |
| 2. | (Mexico) | Henry Martín | 1 |
| 2. | (Mexico) | Patricio Salas | 1 |
| 2. | (Mexico) | Isaías Violante | 1 |
| Total | | | 6 |

== CONCACAF Champions Cup ==
=== Round one ===
| 3 February 2026 First leg | Olimpia | 1–2 | América | Tegucigalpa, Honduras |
| 20:00 CT | J. Álvarez 50'; Mulet (yellow card) 65'; Queiroz (yellow card) 79' | Report | Dourado (yellow card) 42'; Dávila 45+2'; Juárez 88' | Stadium: Estadio Nacional Chelato Uclés; Attendance: 13,274; Referee: Ismail Elfath (United States) |

| 11 February 2026 Second leg | América | 0–0 (2–1 agg.) | Olimpia | Mexico City, Mexico |
| 19:00 CT | | Report | Mulet (yellow card) 15'; Arboleda (yellow card) 68' | Stadium: Estadio Ciudad de los Deportes; Attendance: 19,889; Referee: Drew Fischer (Canada) |

=== Round of 16 ===
| 10 March 2026 First leg | Philadelphia Union | 0–1 | América | Philadelphia, United States |
| 19:00 ET | Martínez (yellow card) 18'; Makhanya (yellow card) 44'; Anello (yellow card) 47' | Report | Veiga 20'; Dourado (yellow card) 87' | Stadium: Subaru Park; Attendance: 18,534; Referee: Keylor Herrera (Costa Rica) |

| 18 March 2026 Second leg | América | 1–1 (2–1 agg.) | Philadelphia Union | Mexico City, Mexico |
| 19:00 CT | Dourado 6'; Cáceres (yellow card) 29' | Report | Bueno 49' (pen.); Ndinga (yellow card) 83' | Stadium: Estadio Ciudad de los Deportes; Attendance: 15,841; Referee: Saíd Martínez (Honduras) |

=== Quarter-finals ===
| 7 April 2026 First leg | Nashville SC | 0–0 | América | Nashville, United States |
| 19:00 CDT | Mukhtar (yellow card) 53' | Report | Dourado (yellow card) 77'; Vázquez (yellow card) 85' | Stadium: Geodis Park; Attendance: 27,167; Referee: Oshane Nation (Jamaica) |

| 14 April 2026 Second leg | América | 0–1 (0–1 agg.) | Nashville SC | Mexico City, Mexico |
| 21:30 CT | | Report | Mukhtar 51'; Yazbek (yellow card) 63'; Schwake (yellow card) 90+2' | Stadium: Estadio Azteca; Attendance: 28,994; Referee: Walter López (Guatemala) |

== Leagues Cup ==
=== League phase ===
| Pos | Team | Pld | W | PW | PL | L | GF | GA | GD | Pts |
|---|---|---|---|---|---|---|---|---|---|---|
| 8 | UNAM | 3 | 1 | 1 | 0 | 1 | 5 | 6 | −1 | 5 |
| 9 | Atlético San Luis | 3 | 1 | 1 | 0 | 1 | 4 | 6 | −2 | 5 |
| 10 | América | 3 | 0 | 2 | 1 | 0 | 6 | 6 | 0 | 5 |
| 11 | Necaxa | 3 | 1 | 0 | 1 | 1 | 6 | 8 | −2 | 4 |
| 12 | Cruz Azul | 3 | 0 | 2 | 0 | 1 | 3 | 10 | −7 | 4 |

Source: Leagues Cup

| Round | 1 | 2 | 3 |
|---|---|---|---|
| Ground | N | N | N |
| Result | D | D | D |
| Position | 9 | 10 | 10 |
| Points | 1 | 3 | 5 |

Source: Leagues Cup
A = Away; H = Home; W = Win; D = Draw; L = Loss

| 30 July 2025 1 | América (Mexico) | 2–2 (1–3 p) | (United States) Real Salt Lake | Sandy, United States |
| 19:30 MDT | Reyes (yellow card) 35'; Rodríguez 42'; Lichnovsky (yellow card) 45'; Sánchez (yellow card) 90+4', (goal) 90+7' | Report | Luna 16', (yellow card) 42'; Agada 45+2' | Stadium: America First Field; Attendance: 19,544; Referee: Saíd Martínez (Honduras) |
| | Penalties |
| | Martín (penalty missed); Fidalgo (penalty scored); Reyes (penalty missed); Zúñiga (penalty missed) | | (penalty scored) Ruiz; (penalty scored) Glad; (penalty scored) Vera; (penalty missed) Ojeda |

| 2 August 2025 2 | América (Mexico) | 3–3 (8–7 p) | (United States) Minnesota United FC | Houston, United States |
| 20:00 CDT | Boxall 27' (o.g.); Lichnovsky (yellow card) 49' (yellow-red card) 62'; Zúñiga 53'; Violante (yellow card) 89'; Cáceres 90' | Report | Oluwaseyi 16'; Hlongwane 31'; Harvey 65' | Stadium: Shell Energy Stadium; Attendance: 13,885; Referee: Drew Fischer (Canada) |
| | Penalties |
| | Rodríguez (penalty scored); Zendejas (penalty scored); Cáceres (penalty scored); Reyes (penalty scored); Aguirre (penalty scored); Borja (penalty scored); Sánchez (penalty scored); Violante (penalty scored) | | Pereyra (penalty scored); Yeboah (penalty scored); Trapp (penalty scored); Harvey (penalty scored); Gressel (penalty scored); Rosales (penalty scored); Boxall (penalty scored); Romero (penalty missed) |

| 6 August 2025 3 | América (Mexico) | 1–1 (5–3 p) | (United States) Portland Timbers | Austin, United States |
| 20:30 CDT | Rodríguez (yellow card) 25'; Sánchez (yellow card) 50'; Juárez 53'; Zendejas (yellow card) 87' | Report | Lassiter 7'; Fory (yellow card) 49' (yellow-red card) 62'; Crépeau (yellow card) 87' | Stadium: Q2 Stadium; Attendance: 9,796; Referee: Guido Gonzales Jr. (United States) |
| | Penalties |
| | Rodríguez (penalty scored); Zendejas (penalty scored); Reyes (penalty scored); Aguirre (penalty scored); Martín (penalty scored) | | Paredes (penalty scored); Miller (penalty missed); Antony (penalty scored); Guerra (penalty scored) |

== Campeón de Campeones ==
| 20 July 2025 Final | América | 1–3 | Toluca | Carson, United States |
| 18:15 PDT | Zendejas 1'; Fidalgo (yellow card) 36'; Violante (yellow card) 45+3'; Reyes (yellow card) 60'; Lichnovsky (red card) 89' | Report | Ruiz (yellow card) 9'; Romero 12', (yellow card) 47'; Vega (yellow card) 31'; Méndez 45+5'; Paulinho 70'; Pereira (yellow card) 78' | Stadium: Dignity Health Sports Park; Referee: Víctor Alfonso Cáceres (Chiapas) |

== Statistics ==
=== Appearances and goals ===
| No. | Pos | Nat | Player | Total | | Apertura 2025 | | Clausura 2026 | | CONCACAF Champions Cup | | Leagues Cup | | Campeón de Campeones | |
| No. | Pos | Nat | Player | Apps | Goals | Apps | Goals | Apps | Goals | Apps | Goals | Apps | Goals | Apps | Goals |
Goalkeepers
| 1 | GK | (Mexico) MEX | Luis Malagón | 32 | 0 | 17 | 0 | 9 | 0 | 3 | 0 | 2 | 0 | 1 | 0 |
| 21 | GK | (Mexico) MEX | Fernando Tapia | 0 | 0 | 0 | 0 | 0 | 0 | 0 | 0 | 0 | 0 | 0 | 0 |
| 30 | GK | (Mexico) MEX | Rodolfo Cota | 17 | 0 | 2 | 0 | 10 | 0 | 3+1 | 0 | 1 | 0 | 0 | 0 |
Defenders
| 3 | DF | (Mexico) MEX | Israel Reyes | 42 | 0 | 16+2 | 0 | 15 | 0 | 5 | 0 | 2+1 | 0 | 1 | 0 |
| 4 | DF | (Uruguay) URU | Sebastián Cáceres | 38 | 1 | 15 | 0 | 12+1 | 0 | 6 | 0 | 2+1 | 1 | 1 | 0 |
| 5 | DF | (Mexico) MEX | Kevin Álvarez | 36 | 1 | 12+4 | 1 | 12+3 | 0 | 2 | 0 | 1+1 | 0 | 0+1 | 0 |
| 14 | DF | (Mexico) MEX | Néstor Araujo | 1 | 0 | 0 | 0 | 1 | 0 | 0 | 0 | 0 | 0 | 0 | 0 |
| 15 | DF | (United States) USA | Ralph Orquin | 3 | 0 | 2 | 0 | 0 | 0 | 0 | 0 | 1 | 0 | 0 | 0 |
| 18 | DF | (Mexico) MEX | Aarón Mejía | 8 | 0 | 0 | 0 | 4+1 | 0 | 2+1 | 0 | 0 | 0 | 0 | 0 |
| 22 | DF | (Uruguay) URU | Thiago Espinosa | 6 | 0 | 0 | 0 | 1+4 | 0 | 0+1 | 0 | 0 | 0 | 0 | 0 |
| 26 | DF | (Colombia) COL | Cristian Borja | 43 | 0 | 17+1 | 0 | 16+1 | 0 | 5 | 0 | 2 | 0 | 1 | 0 |
| 29 | DF | (Mexico) MEX | Ramón Juárez | 34 | 4 | 11+4 | 2 | 8+5 | 0 | 3+1 | 1 | 1 | 1 | 0+1 | 0 |
| 32 | DF | (Mexico) MEX | Miguel Vázquez | 14 | 0 | 2+1 | 0 | 8 | 0 | 1+2 | 0 | 0 | 0 | 0 | 0 |
Midfielders
| 6 | MF | (Mexico) MEX | Jonathan dos Santos | 34 | 0 | 3+7 | 0 | 12+4 | 0 | 3+3 | 0 | 2 | 0 | 0 | 0 |
| 10 | MF | (United States) USA | Alejandro Zendejas | 37 | 13 | 12+4 | 6 | 11+1 | 6 | 4+1 | 0 | 2+1 | 0 | 1 | 1 |
| 12 | MF | (Mexico) MEX | Isaías Violante | 31 | 2 | 1+10 | 0 | 6+7 | 2 | 1+2 | 0 | 1+2 | 0 | 1 | 0 |
| 13 | MF | (Mexico) MEX | Alan Cervantes | 23 | 1 | 6+7 | 1 | 1+5 | 0 | 0+2 | 0 | 1 | 0 | 0+1 | 0 |
| 17 | MF | (Brazil) BRA | Rodrigo Dourado | 22 | 1 | 0 | 0 | 14+3 | 0 | 5 | 1 | 0 | 0 | 0 | 0 |
| 20 | MF | (Mexico) MEX | Alexis Gutiérrez | 30 | 1 | 10+2 | 0 | 8+4 | 1 | 2+1 | 0 | 1+1 | 0 | 0+1 | 0 |
| 23 | MF | (Brazil) BRA | Raphael Veiga | 20 | 3 | 0 | 0 | 9+6 | 2 | 4+1 | 1 | 0 | 0 | 0 | 0 |
| 28 | MF | (Mexico) MEX | Érick Sánchez | 40 | 4 | 12+3 | 2 | 12+3 | 1 | 6 | 0 | 1+2 | 1 | 1 | 0 |
| 34 | MF | (Mexico) MEX | Dagoberto Espinoza | 9 | 1 | 7 | 1 | 1 | 0 | 0 | 0 | 1 | 0 | 0 | 0 |
| 35 | MF | (Mexico) MEX | Santiago Naveda | 0 | 0 | 0 | 0 | 0 | 0 | 0 | 0 | 0 | 0 | 0 | 0 |
| 45 | MF | (Brazil) BRA | Lima | 16 | 1 | 0 | 0 | 2+10 | 1 | 0+4 | 0 | 0 | 0 | 0 | 0 |
Forwards
| 7 | FW | (Uruguay) URU | Brian Rodríguez | 44 | 14 | 13+4 | 7 | 15+3 | 6 | 4+1 | 0 | 2+1 | 1 | 1 | 0 |
| 9 | FW | (Mexico) MEX | Henry Martín | 15 | 1 | 1+2 | 0 | 3+4 | 1 | 0+2 | 0 | 1+2 | 0 | 0 | 0 |
| 11 | FW | (Chile) CHI | Víctor Dávila | 26 | 4 | 4+9 | 1 | 5+4 | 2 | 2 | 1 | 2 | 0 | 0 | 0 |
| 19 | FW | (Colombia) COL | Raúl Zúñiga | 38 | 5 | 7+6 | 3 | 4+11 | 1 | 1+5 | 0 | 2+1 | 1 | 0+1 | 0 |
| 33 | FW | (Mexico) MEX | Patricio Salas | 25 | 3 | 1+4 | 0 | 7+9 | 3 | 4 | 0 | 0 | 0 | 0 | 0 |
Players transferred out during the season
| 8 | MF | (Spain) ESP | Álvaro Fidalgo | 24 | 1 | 14+4 | 1 | 3 | 0 | 0 | 0 | 2 | 0 | 1 | 0 |
| 27 | FW | (Uruguay) URU | Rodrigo Aguirre | 24 | 4 | 11+7 | 4 | 2 | 0 | 0 | 0 | 1+2 | 0 | 1 | 0 |
| 31 | DF | (Chile) CHI | Igor Lichnovsky | 11 | 1 | 6+2 | 1 | 0 | 0 | 0 | 0 | 2 | 0 | 1 | 0 |
| 97 | FW | (France) FRA | Allan Saint-Maximin | 16 | 3 | 7+6 | 3 | 2+1 | 0 | 0 | 0 | 0 | 0 | 0 | 0 |

Source: Competitions

=== Disciplinary record ===
The list is sorted by squad number when total cards are equal.

| Rank | Pos. | No. | Player | Apertura 2025 | | | Clausura 2026 | | | CONCACAF Champions Cup | | | Leagues Cup | | | Campeón de Campeones | | | Total | | |
| Rank | Pos. | No. | Player | Booked | (yellow card) (yellow-red card) | Sent off (straight red) | Booked | (yellow card) (yellow-red card) | Sent off (straight red) | Booked | (yellow card) (yellow-red card) | Sent off (straight red) | Booked | (yellow card) (yellow-red card) | Sent off (straight red) | Booked | (yellow card) (yellow-red card) | Sent off (straight red) | Booked | (yellow card) (yellow-red card) | Sent off (straight red) |
|---|---|---|---|---|---|---|---|---|---|---|---|---|---|---|---|---|---|---|---|---|---|
| 1. | DF | 4 | (Uruguay) Sebastián Cáceres | 5 | 0 | 0 | 2 | 0 | 0 | 1 | 0 | 0 | 0 | 0 | 0 | 0 | 0 | 0 | 8 | 0 | 0 |
| 2. | MF | 17 | (Brazil) Rodrigo Dourado | 0 | 0 | 0 | 4 | 0 | 0 | 3 | 0 | 0 | 0 | 0 | 0 | 0 | 0 | 0 | 7 | 0 | 0 |
| 3. | MF | 12 | (Mexico) Isaías Violante | 2 | 0 | 0 | 2 | 0 | 0 | 0 | 0 | 0 | 1 | 0 | 0 | 1 | 0 | 0 | 6 | 0 | 0 |
| 3. | MF | 28 | (Mexico) Érick Sánchez | 2 | 0 | 1 | 1 | 0 | 0 | 0 | 0 | 0 | 2 | 0 | 0 | 0 | 0 | 0 | 5 | 0 | 1 |
| 5. | DF | 3 | (Mexico) Israel Reyes | 1 | 0 | 0 | 2 | 0 | 0 | 0 | 0 | 0 | 1 | 0 | 0 | 1 | 0 | 0 | 5 | 0 | 0 |
| 5. | MF | 7 | (Uruguay) Brian Rodríguez | 2 | 0 | 0 | 2 | 0 | 0 | 0 | 0 | 0 | 1 | 0 | 0 | 0 | 0 | 0 | 5 | 0 | 0 |
| 5. | MF | 10 | (United States) Alejandro Zendejas | 4 | 0 | 0 | 0 | 0 | 0 | 0 | 0 | 0 | 1 | 0 | 0 | 0 | 0 | 0 | 5 | 0 | 0 |
| 8. | DF | 26 | (Colombia) Cristian Borja | 3 | 0 | 0 | 1 | 0 | 0 | 0 | 0 | 0 | 0 | 0 | 0 | 0 | 0 | 0 | 4 | 0 | 0 |
| 8. | DF | 31 | (Chile) Igor Lichnovsky | 1 | 0 | 0 | 0 | 0 | 0 | 0 | 0 | 0 | 1 | 1 | 0 | 0 | 0 | 1 | 2 | 1 | 1 |
| 10. | GK | 1 | (Mexico) Luis Malagón | 3 | 0 | 0 | 0 | 0 | 0 | 0 | 0 | 0 | 0 | 0 | 0 | 0 | 0 | 0 | 3 | 0 | 0 |
| 10. | MF | 6 | (Mexico) Jonathan dos Santos | 3 | 0 | 0 | 0 | 0 | 0 | 0 | 0 | 0 | 0 | 0 | 0 | 0 | 0 | 0 | 3 | 0 | 0 |
| 10. | DF | 18 | (Mexico) Aarón Mejía | 0 | 0 | 0 | 3 | 0 | 0 | 0 | 0 | 0 | 0 | 0 | 0 | 0 | 0 | 0 | 3 | 0 | 0 |
| 10. | FW | 19 | (Colombia) Raúl Zúñiga | 3 | 0 | 0 | 0 | 0 | 0 | 0 | 0 | 0 | 0 | 0 | 0 | 0 | 0 | 0 | 3 | 0 | 0 |
| 10. | DF | 29 | (Mexico) Ramón Juárez | 1 | 0 | 0 | 1 | 0 | 1 | 0 | 0 | 0 | 0 | 0 | 0 | 0 | 0 | 0 | 2 | 0 | 1 |
| 10. | FW | 97 | (France) Allan Saint-Maximin | 3 | 0 | 0 | 0 | 0 | 0 | 0 | 0 | 0 | 0 | 0 | 0 | 0 | 0 | 0 | 3 | 0 | 0 |
| 16. | MF | 8 | (Spain) Álvaro Fidalgo | 1 | 0 | 0 | 0 | 0 | 0 | 0 | 0 | 0 | 0 | 0 | 0 | 1 | 0 | 0 | 2 | 0 | 0 |
| 16. | FW | 11 | (Chile) Víctor Dávila | 1 | 0 | 0 | 1 | 0 | 0 | 0 | 0 | 0 | 0 | 0 | 0 | 0 | 0 | 0 | 2 | 0 | 0 |
| 16. | MF | 23 | (Brazil) Raphael Veiga | 0 | 0 | 0 | 2 | 0 | 0 | 0 | 0 | 0 | 0 | 0 | 0 | 0 | 0 | 0 | 2 | 0 | 0 |
| 16. | FW | 27 | (Uruguay) Rodrigo Aguirre | 2 | 0 | 0 | 0 | 0 | 0 | 0 | 0 | 0 | 0 | 0 | 0 | 0 | 0 | 0 | 2 | 0 | 0 |
| 16. | DF | 32 | (Mexico) Miguel Vázquez | 0 | 0 | 0 | 1 | 0 | 0 | 1 | 0 | 0 | 0 | 0 | 0 | 0 | 0 | 0 | 2 | 0 | 0 |
| 16. | FW | 33 | (Mexico) Patricio Salas | 0 | 0 | 0 | 2 | 0 | 0 | 0 | 0 | 0 | 0 | 0 | 0 | 0 | 0 | 0 | 2 | 0 | 0 |
| 22. | DF | 5 | (Mexico) Kevin Álvarez | 1 | 0 | 0 | 0 | 0 | 0 | 0 | 0 | 0 | 0 | 0 | 0 | 0 | 0 | 0 | 1 | 0 | 0 |
| 22. | MF | 13 | (Mexico) Alan Cervantes | 1 | 0 | 0 | 0 | 0 | 0 | 0 | 0 | 0 | 0 | 0 | 0 | 0 | 0 | 0 | 1 | 0 | 0 |
| 22. | DF | 14 | (Mexico) Néstor Araujo | 0 | 0 | 0 | 1 | 0 | 0 | 0 | 0 | 0 | 0 | 0 | 0 | 0 | 0 | 0 | 1 | 0 | 0 |
| 22. | MF | 20 | (Mexico) Alexis Gutiérrez | 1 | 0 | 0 | 0 | 0 | 0 | 0 | 0 | 0 | 0 | 0 | 0 | 0 | 0 | 0 | 1 | 0 | 0 |
| 22. | DF | 22 | (Uruguay) Thiago Espinosa | 0 | 0 | 0 | 1 | 0 | 0 | 0 | 0 | 0 | 0 | 0 | 0 | 0 | 0 | 0 | 1 | 0 | 0 |
| 22. | GK | 30 | (Mexico) Rodolfo Cota | 0 | 0 | 0 | 1 | 0 | 0 | 0 | 0 | 0 | 0 | 0 | 0 | 0 | 0 | 0 | 1 | 0 | 0 |
| 22. | MF | 34 | (Mexico) Dagoberto Espinoza | 1 | 0 | 0 | 0 | 0 | 0 | 0 | 0 | 0 | 0 | 0 | 0 | 0 | 0 | 0 | 1 | 0 | 0 |
| 22. | MF | 45 | (Brazil) Lima | 0 | 0 | 0 | 0 | 0 | 1 | 0 | 0 | 0 | 0 | 0 | 0 | 0 | 0 | 0 | 0 | 0 | 1 |
| Totals | | | | 39 | 0 | 1 | 28 | 0 | 2 | 5 | 0 | 0 | 7 | 1 | 0 | 3 | 0 | 1 | 82 | 1 | 4 |

Source: Competitions
