= List of Mexican football transfers winter 2023–24 =

This is a list of Mexican football transfers for the 2023–24 winter transfer window, grouped by club. It includes football transfers related to clubs from the Liga BBVA MX.

== Liga BBVA MX ==
=== América ===
In: Note: Flags indicate national team as defined under FIFA eligibility rules; some limited exceptions apply. Players may hold more than one non-FIFA nationality.

No.	Pos.	Nation	Player
18	DF	MEX	Cristian Calderón (Free agent, last with Guadalajara)
19	FW	MEX	Illian Hernández (on loan from Pachuca)
24	FW	NED	Javairô Dilrosun (from (Netherlands) Feyenoord)

Out: Note: Flags indicate national team as defined under FIFA eligibility rules; some limited exceptions apply. Players may hold more than one non-FIFA nationality.

No.	Pos.	Nation	Player
19	DF	MEX	Miguel Layún (Retired)
32	MF	ARG	Leonardo Suárez (to UNAM)
34	DF	USA	Ralph Orquin (on loan to Juárez)

=== Atlas ===
In: Note: Flags indicate national team as defined under FIFA eligibility rules; some limited exceptions apply. Players may hold more than one non-FIFA nationality.

No.	Pos.	Nation	Player
7	MF	MEX	Raymundo Fulgencio (on loan from UANL)
15	FW	VEN	Jhon Murillo (on loan from Atlético San Luis)

Out: Note: Flags indicate national team as defined under FIFA eligibility rules; some limited exceptions apply. Players may hold more than one non-FIFA nationality.

No.	Pos.	Nation	Player
4	DF	MEX	José Abella (to Juárez)
17	MF	MEX	Jaziel Martínez (loan return to Monterrey)

=== Atlético San Luis ===
In: Note: Flags indicate national team as defined under FIFA eligibility rules; some limited exceptions apply. Players may hold more than one non-FIFA nationality.

No.	Pos.	Nation	Player
17	FW	CIV	Franck Boli (from (United States) Portland Timbers)
18	DF	MEX	Aldo Cruz (loan return from Juárez)
21	MF	MEX	Óscar Macías (from Guadalajara, previously at Tapatío)
22	FW	BRA	Yan Phillipe (from (Brazil) Atlético Mineiro)
26	FW	MEX	José González (from Guadalajara, previously at Tapatío)
28	MF	MEX	Jonantan Villal (from (United States) Atlanta United 2)

Out: Note: Flags indicate national team as defined under FIFA eligibility rules; some limited exceptions apply. Players may hold more than one non-FIFA nationality.

No.	Pos.	Nation	Player
7	FW	VEN	Jhon Murillo (on loan to Atlas)
10	MF	MEX	Dieter Villalpando (to Juárez)
17	FW	MEX	Ángel Zaldívar (to Juárez)
–	DF	MEX	Juan Pablo Martínez (to Oaxaca, previously on loan at (Brazil) Botafogo-SP)

=== Cruz Azul ===
In: Note: Flags indicate national team as defined under FIFA eligibility rules; some limited exceptions apply. Players may hold more than one non-FIFA nationality.

No.	Pos.	Nation	Player
8	MF	ARG	Lorenzo Faravelli (from (Ecuador) Independiente del Valle)
12	GK	MEX	Luis Jiménez (from Necaxa)
13	DF	URU	Camilo Cándido (from (Uruguay) Nacional, previously on loan at (Brazil) Bahia)
23	GK	COL	Kevin Mier (from (Colombia) Atlético Nacional)
27	FW	URU	Gabriel Fernández (from UNAM)
33	DF	ARG	Gonzalo Piovi (from (Argentina) Racing)

Out: Note: Flags indicate national team as defined under FIFA eligibility rules; some limited exceptions apply. Players may hold more than one non-FIFA nationality.

No.	Pos.	Nation	Player
5	MF	COL	Kevin Castaño (to (Russia) Krasnodar)
8	MF	MEX	Jesús Dueñas (Unattached)
10	FW	BRA	Moisés (to (Brazil) Fortaleza)
17	DF	MEX	Alonso Escoboza (to Mazatlán)
20	FW	CHI	Iván Morales (to (Argentina) Sarmiento)
24	DF	PAR	Juan Escobar (on loan to Toluca)
25	GK	MEX	Sebastián Jurado (on loan to Juárez)
28	FW	COL	Diber Cambindo (on loan to Necaxa)

=== Guadalajara ===
In: Note: Flags indicate national team as defined under FIFA eligibility rules; some limited exceptions apply. Players may hold more than one non-FIFA nationality.

No.	Pos.	Nation	Player
14	FW	MEX	Javier Hernández (from (United States) LA Galaxy)
16	MF	USA	Cade Cowell (from (United States) San Jose Earthquakes)
21	DF	MEX	José Castillo (from Pachuca)

Out: Note: Flags indicate national team as defined under FIFA eligibility rules; some limited exceptions apply. Players may hold more than one non-FIFA nationality.

No.	Pos.	Nation	Player
10	FW	MEX	Alexis Vega (to Toluca)
19	DF	MEX	Alejandro Mayorga (to Necaxa)
21	DF	MEX	Hiram Mier (Unattached)
26	DF	MEX	Cristian Calderón (to América)
33	MF	MEX	Zahid Muñoz (on loan to Juárez)
–	MF	MEX	Óscar Macías (to Atlético San Luis, previously at Tapatío)
–	FW	MEX	José González (to Atlético San Luis, previously at Tapatío)
–	FW	PER	Santiago Ormeño (on loan to Puebla, previously on loan at Juárez)
–	FW	MEX	Jesús Godínez (to (China) Nantong Zhiyun, previously on loan at (Costa Rica) Herediano)

=== Juárez ===
In: Note: Flags indicate national team as defined under FIFA eligibility rules; some limited exceptions apply. Players may hold more than one non-FIFA nationality.

No.	Pos.	Nation	Player
2	DF	MEX	Arturo Ortiz (from UNAM)
4	DF	MEX	José Abella (from Atlas)
10	MF	MEX	Dieter Villalpando (from Atlético San Luis)
15	MF	MEX	Zahid Muñoz (on loan from Guadalajara)
16	DF	CRC	Francisco Calvo (from (Turkey) Konyaspor)
25	GK	MEX	Sebastián Jurado (on loan from Cruz Azul)
29	FW	MEX	Ángel Zaldívar (from Atlético San Luis)
30	MF	MEX	Jesús Venegas (on loan from Toluca)
31	GK	USA	Benny Díaz (on loan from Tijuana, previously on loan at (United States) El Paso Locomotive)
34	DF	USA	Ralph Orquin (on loan from América)

Out: Note: Flags indicate national team as defined under FIFA eligibility rules; some limited exceptions apply. Players may hold more than one non-FIFA nationality.

No.	Pos.	Nation	Player
9	FW	PER	Santiago Ormeño (loan return to Guadalajara, later loaned to Puebla)
17	MF	MEX	Mario Osuna (Unattached)
25	DF	MEX	Aldo Cruz (loan return to Atlético San Luis)
28	DF	MEX	Luis Rodríguez (to Pachuca)

=== León ===
In: Note: Flags indicate national team as defined under FIFA eligibility rules; some limited exceptions apply. Players may hold more than one non-FIFA nationality.

No.	Pos.	Nation	Player
16	MF	URU	Alan Medina (from (Uruguay) Liverpool Montevideo)
17	MF	MEX	Andrés Guardado (from (Spain) Betis)
19	MF	URU	Gonzalo Nápoli (from (Uruguay) Liverpool Montevideo)

Out: Note: Flags indicate national team as defined under FIFA eligibility rules; some limited exceptions apply. Players may hold more than one non-FIFA nationality.

No.	Pos.	Nation	Player
9	FW	MEX	Brian Rubio (loan return to Mazatlán)
16	MF	COL	Omar Fernández (on loan to (Chile) Everton)
23	MF	ESP	Borja Sánchez (loan return to (Spain) Oviedo)
29	MF	ARG	Lucas Romero (to (Brazil) Cruzeiro)
–	MF	ECU	Byron Castillo (on loan to (Uruguay) Peñarol, previously on loan at Pachuca)

=== Mazatlán ===
In: Note: Flags indicate national team as defined under FIFA eligibility rules; some limited exceptions apply. Players may hold more than one non-FIFA nationality.

No.	Pos.	Nation	Player
9	FW	MEX	Brian Rubio (loan return from León)
17	DF	MEX	Alonso Escoboza (from Cruz Azul)
18	FW	ECU	Stiven Plaza (from (Ecuador) Guayaquil City)
32	FW	ARG	Gustavo Del Prete (on loan from UNAM)
–	MF	MEX	Mauro Lainez (from América, previously on loan at Querétaro)

Out: Note: Flags indicate national team as defined under FIFA eligibility rules; some limited exceptions apply. Players may hold more than one non-FIFA nationality.

No.	Pos.	Nation	Player
3	DF	MEX	Néstor Vidrio (to Venados)
9	FW	CIV	Aké Loba (Unattached)
17	DF	MEX	Francisco Venegas (on loan to Querétaro)
28	DF	MEX	Jorge Padilla (to UdeG)

=== Monterrey ===
In: Note: Flags indicate national team as defined under FIFA eligibility rules; some limited exceptions apply. Players may hold more than one non-FIFA nationality.

No.	Pos.	Nation	Player
3	DF	MEX	Gerardo Arteaga (from (Belgium) Genk)
13	MF	MEX	Jaziel Martínez (loan return from Atlas)
23	FW	USA	Brandon Vázquez (from (United States) FC Cincinnati)
30	MF	ARG	Jorge Rodríguez (from (Argentina) Estudiantes)
32	DF	MEX	Tony Leone (Free agent, last with (United States) Los Angeles FC 2)

Out: Note: Flags indicate national team as defined under FIFA eligibility rules; some limited exceptions apply. Players may hold more than one non-FIFA nationality.

No.	Pos.	Nation	Player
7	FW	MEX	Rogelio Funes Mori (to UNAM)
207	FW	MEX	Alí Ávila (on loan to UNAM)

=== Necaxa ===
In: Note: Flags indicate national team as defined under FIFA eligibility rules; some limited exceptions apply. Players may hold more than one non-FIFA nationality.

No.	Pos.	Nation	Player
5	DF	MEX	Alejandro Mayorga (from Guadalajara)
10	MF	ARG	José Paradela (on loan from (Argentina) River Plate)
27	FW	COL	Diber Cambindo (on loan from Cruz Azul)

Out: Note: Flags indicate national team as defined under FIFA eligibility rules; some limited exceptions apply. Players may hold more than one non-FIFA nationality.

No.	Pos.	Nation	Player
9	FW	URU	Facundo Batista (on loan to Querétaro)
10	MF	COL	Daniel Mantilla (loan return to (Colombia) Atlético Nacional)
14	MF	MEX	Misael Domínguez (on loan to Querétaro)
25	MF	URU	Vicente Poggi (on loan to (Argentina) Godoy Cruz)
28	DF	MEX	Cristian González (to Tlaxcala)
34	DF	VEN	Jhon Chancellor (Unattached)
201	GK	MEX	Luis Jiménez (to Cruz Azul)

=== Pachuca ===
In: Note: Flags indicate national team as defined under FIFA eligibility rules; some limited exceptions apply. Players may hold more than one non-FIFA nationality.

No.	Pos.	Nation	Player
3	DF	MEX	Alonso Aceves (loan return from (United States) Chicago Fire)
6	MF	COL	Nelson Deossa (from (Colombia) Atlético Huila)
23	FW	VEN	Salomón Rondón (from (Argentina) River Plate)
24	DF	MEX	Luis Rodríguez (Free agent, previously at Juárez)
32	DF	MEX	Carlos Sánchez (from Zacatecas)
33	DF	ECU	Andrés Micolta (from (Ecuador) El Nacional)

Out: Note: Flags indicate national team as defined under FIFA eligibility rules; some limited exceptions apply. Players may hold more than one non-FIFA nationality.

No.	Pos.	Nation	Player
6	MF	ECU	Byron Castillo (loan return to León, later loaned to (Uruguay) Peñarol)
14	DF	MEX	José Castillo (to Guadalajara)
18	FW	COL	Marino Hinestroza (to (United States) Columbus Crew)
21	FW	MEX	Tony Figueroa (to Toluca)
26	MF	MEX	Jahaziel Marchand (to UdeG)
29	FW	MEX	Illian Hernández (on loan to América)
80	FW	URU	David Terans (to (Brazil) Fluminense)

=== Puebla ===
In: Note: Flags indicate national team as defined under FIFA eligibility rules; some limited exceptions apply. Players may hold more than one non-FIFA nationality.

No.	Pos.	Nation	Player
1	MF	MEX	Fernando Navarro (from Toluca)
9	FW	CAN	Lucas Cavallini (from Tijuana)
13	DF	MEX	Ivo Vázquez (loan return from La Paz)
17	FW	PER	Santiago Ormeño (on loan from Guadalajara, previously on loan at Juárez)

Out: Note: Flags indicate national team as defined under FIFA eligibility rules; some limited exceptions apply. Players may hold more than one non-FIFA nationality.

No.	Pos.	Nation	Player
15	FW	MEX	Guillermo Martínez (to UNAM)

=== Querétaro ===
In: Note: Flags indicate national team as defined under FIFA eligibility rules; some limited exceptions apply. Players may hold more than one non-FIFA nationality.

No.	Pos.	Nation	Player
7	MF	VEN	Samuel Sosa (on loan from (Argentina) Talleres, previously on loan at (Ecuador) Emelec)
9	FW	URU	Facundo Batista (on loan from Necaxa)
17	DF	MEX	Francisco Venegas (on loan from Mazatlán)
18	DF	MEX	Brayton Vázquez (from Sinaloa)
19	MF	MEX	Jesús Vega (on loan from Tijuana)
20	MF	MEX	Misael Domínguez (on loan from Necaxa)
32	MF	ARG	Martín Río (from (Argentina) Quilmes)

Out: Note: Flags indicate national team as defined under FIFA eligibility rules; some limited exceptions apply. Players may hold more than one non-FIFA nationality.

No.	Pos.	Nation	Player
17	FW	BRA	Camilo Sanvezzo (Unattached)
19	FW	COL	Raúl Zúñiga (to Tijuana)
20	MF	MEX	Mauro Lainez (loan return to América, later to Mazatlán)
28	MF	MEX	Alberto García (Unattached)

=== Santos Laguna ===
In: Note: Flags indicate national team as defined under FIFA eligibility rules; some limited exceptions apply. Players may hold more than one non-FIFA nationality.

No.	Pos.	Nation	Player
4	DF	ARG	Santiago Núñez (from (Argentina) Estudiantes)
5	DF	ARG	Bruno Amione (from (Italy) Hellas Verona)
9	MF	MEX	Jordán Carrillo (loan return from (Spain) Sporting Gijón)
10	MF	URU	Franco Fagúndez (from (Uruguay) Nacional)
26	MF	ARG	Ramiro Sordo (from (Argentina) Newell's Old Boys)
32	DF	MEX	Vladimir Loroña (on loan from UANL)

Out: Note: Flags indicate national team as defined under FIFA eligibility rules; some limited exceptions apply. Players may hold more than one non-FIFA nationality.

No.	Pos.	Nation	Player
2	DF	MEX	Omar Campos (to (United States) Los Angeles FC)
4	DF	MEX	Alejandro Gómez (to Tijuana)
5	DF	ECU	Félix Torres (to (Brazil) Corinthians)
9	FW	ARG	Javier Correa (to (Argentina) Estudiantes)
10	MF	ARG	Juan Brunetta (to UANL)
12	GK	MEX	Santiago Ramírez (loan return to Venados)

=== Tijuana ===
In: Note: Flags indicate national team as defined under FIFA eligibility rules; some limited exceptions apply. Players may hold more than one non-FIFA nationality.

No.	Pos.	Nation	Player
6	MF	USA	Joe Corona (from (United States) San Diego Loyal)
12	DF	MEX	Areli Hernández (from Dorados)
13	FW	COL	Raúl Zúñiga (from Querétaro)
17	FW	MEX	Rubén Hernández (loan return from Sinaloa)
28	DF	MEX	Alejandro Gómez (from Santos Laguna)

Out: Note: Flags indicate national team as defined under FIFA eligibility rules; some limited exceptions apply. Players may hold more than one non-FIFA nationality.

No.	Pos.	Nation	Player
9	FW	CAN	Lucas Cavallini (to Puebla)
24	MF	MEX	Jesús Vega (on loan to Querétaro)
–	GK	USA	Benny Díaz (on loan to Juárez, previously on loan at (United States) El Paso Locomotive)

=== Toluca ===
In: Note: Flags indicate national team as defined under FIFA eligibility rules; some limited exceptions apply. Players may hold more than one non-FIFA nationality.

No.	Pos.	Nation	Player
6	DF	URU	Federico Pereira (from (Uruguay) Liverpool Montevideo)
21	FW	MEX	Tony Figueroa (from Pachuca)
24	DF	PAR	Juan Escobar (on loan from Cruz Azul)
25	FW	MEX	Alexis Vega (from Guadalajara)

Out: Note: Flags indicate national team as defined under FIFA eligibility rules; some limited exceptions apply. Players may hold more than one non-FIFA nationality.

No.	Pos.	Nation	Player
18	MF	MEX	Fernando Navarro (to Puebla)
26	DF	COL	Andrés Mosquera (to (Colombia) América de Cali)
30	MF	MEX	Jesús Venegas (to Juárez)

=== UNAM ===
In: Note: Flags indicate national team as defined under FIFA eligibility rules; some limited exceptions apply. Players may hold more than one non-FIFA nationality.

No.	Pos.	Nation	Player
9	FW	MEX	Guillermo Martínez (from Puebla)
19	FW	MEX	Alí Ávila (on loan from Monterrey)
27	MF	PER	Piero Quispe (from (Peru) Universitario de Deportes)
29	FW	MEX	Rogelio Funes Mori (Free Agent, previously at Monterrey)
32	MF	ARG	Leonardo Suárez (from América)

Out: Note: Flags indicate national team as defined under FIFA eligibility rules; some limited exceptions apply. Players may hold more than one non-FIFA nationality.

No.	Pos.	Nation	Player
9	FW	ARG	Juan Dinenno (to (Brazil) Cruzeiro)
19	FW	URU	Gabriel Fernández (to Cruz Azul)
21	FW	ARG	Gustavo Del Prete (on loan to Mazatlán)
25	DF	MEX	Arturo Ortiz (to Juárez)

=== UANL ===
In: Note: Flags indicate national team as defined under FIFA eligibility rules; some limited exceptions apply. Players may hold more than one non-FIFA nationality.

No.	Pos.	Nation	Player
11	MF	ARG	Juan Brunetta (from Santos Laguna)

Out: Note: Flags indicate national team as defined under FIFA eligibility rules; some limited exceptions apply. Players may hold more than one non-FIFA nationality.

No.	Pos.	Nation	Player
22	MF	MEX	Raymundo Fulgencio (on loan to Atlas)
32	DF	MEX	Vladimir Loroña (on loan to Santos Laguna)
