= Thiago Espinosa =

Uruguayan footballer

Personal information
- Full name: Thiago Nahuel Espinosa Novat
- Date of birth: November 9, 2004 (age 21)
- Place of birth: Rosario, Uruguay
- Height: 1.76 m (5 ft 9 in)
- Position: Left-back

Team information
- Current team: Peñarol (on loan from América)
- Number: 26

Youth career
- 2020–2024: Peñarol

Senior career*
Years	Team	Apps	(Gls)
2024–2026	Racing de Montevideo	62	(4)
2026	→ América (loan)	5	(0)
2026–	América	0	(0)
2026–	→ Peñarol (loan)	0	(0)
- * Club domestic league appearances and goals as of February 10, 2026

Thiago Espinosa (born November 9, 2004) is a Uruguayan professional footballer who plays as a defender for Liga AUF Uruguaya club Peñarol, on loan from Liga MX club América.

== Club career ==
=== Racing Club de Montevideo ===
Espinosa joined Racing CM in January 2024 and made his debut at the age of 19 on 19 April 2024 in a 1–1 Uruguayan Primera División draw against Cerro. Espinosa made 24 appearances and scored twice in his debut season.

=== Club América ===
Espinosa joined América on 9 February 2026 on a loan with an option to buy from Racing CM and was included in the official roster for the Liga MX Clausura 2026 season. Espinosa joined América at a similar age as his compatriots Sebastián Cáceres and Brian Rodríguez, who went on to become key players in the club’s recent success.

=== Peñarol ===
Espinosa joined Peñarol on 21 July 2026 on a loan with no option to buy from América after he was recently acquired from Racing CM in the summer 2026 transfer window.

== Honours ==
Peñarol

- Copa Libertadores U-20:2022
