= 2024–25 Club Tijuana season =

Club Tijuana
2024–25 season
- Manager: Juan Carlos Osorio
- Stadium: Estadio Caliente
- Liga MX Torneo Apertura: 5th
- Leagues Cup: Round of 32
- Top goalscorer: League: Raúl Zúñiga (4); All: Raúl Zúñiga (4)

The 2024–25 season is Club Tijuana's 102nd season in existence and their ninth consecutive appearance in the top flight.

== Players ==
As of 5 July 2024

Note: Flags indicate national team as defined under FIFA eligibility rules; some limited exceptions apply. Players may hold more than one non-FIFA nationality.

No.	Pos.	Nation	Player
2	GK	MEX	José Antonio Rodríguez
3	DF	MEX	Rafael Fernández
4	DF	CHI	Nicolás Díaz
5	DF	MEX	Rodrigo Parra
6	MF	USA	Joe Corona
8	MF	MEX	Fernando Madrigal
10	MF	MEX	Kevin Castañeda
11	MF	MEX	Efraín Álvarez
14	MF	COL	Christian Rivera
15	DF	MEX	Diego Barbosa
16	MF	MEX	Alan Vega
18	DF	MEX	Aarón Mejía
19	MF	MEX	Eduardo Armenta

No.	Pos.	Nation	Player
20	MF	MEX	Francisco Contreras
21	DF	MEX	Fernando Monarrez
22	MF	ARG	Carlos Valenzuela
23	MF	MEX	Iván Tona
26	FW	COL	José Raúl Zúñiga
27	MF	ARG	Domingo Blanco
28	DF	MEX	Alejandro Gómez (on loan from Santos Laguna)
30	GK	MEX	José de Jesús Corona
31	DF	ESP	Unai Bilbao
32	FW	PAR	Carlos González
33	MF	ARG	Emanuel Reynoso
34	FW	MEX	Gerson Vázquez
35	DF	COL	Kevin Balanta

=== Out on loan ===
Note: Flags indicate national team as defined under FIFA eligibility rules; some limited exceptions apply. Players may hold more than one non-FIFA nationality.

No.	Pos.	Nation	Player
—	GK	MEX	Ignacio Castro (at Sinaloa)
—	GK	USA	Benny Díaz (at Juárez)
—	GK	MEX	Ricardo Díaz (at Tepatitlán)
—	DF	MEX	Abraham Flores (at Sinaloa)
—	MF	MEX	Manuel Carrillo (at Sinaloa)
—	MF	COL	Fabián Castillo (at Deportivo Cali)

No.	Pos.	Nation	Player
—	MF	ARG	Federico Lértora (at Querétaro)
—	MF	CHI	Joaquín Montecinos (at O'Higgins)
—	MF	ARG	Lucas Rodríguez (at Querétaro)
—	FW	MEX	Arath Egaña (at Sinaloa)
—	FW	CIV	Aké Loba (at Querétaro)

== Competitions ==
=== Overall record ===
Competition	First match	Last match	Starting round	Final position	Record							
Competition	First match	Last match	Starting round	Final position	Pld	W	D	L	GF	GA	GD	Win %
Liga MX Apertura	6 July 2024	8 November 2024	Matchday 1		6	3	2	1	12	10	+2	50.00
Leagues Cup	26 July 2024	3 August 2024	Group stage	Group stage	2	0	0	2	1	6	−5	0.00
Total					8	3	2	3	13	16	−3	37.50

Last updated: 24 August 2024
Source: Soccerway

=== Liga MX ===
==== Torneo Apertura ====
Pos	Team	Pld	W	D	L	GF	GA	GD	Pts	Qualification
5	Monterrey	17	9	4	4	26	19	+7	31	Qualification for the quarter–finals (Note: The first six places in the table qualifed for the Liguilla quarter-finals.)
6	Atlético San Luis	17	9	3	5	27	19	+8	30	Qualification for the quarter–finals
7	Tijuana	17	8	5	4	24	25	−1	29	Qualification for the play-in round (Note: Teams ranked 7th to 10th qualified for the play-in round.)
8	América (C)	17	8	3	6	27	21	+6	27	Qualification for the play-in round
9	Guadalajara	17	7	4	6	24	15	+9	25	Qualification for the play-in round

Source: Liga MX
Rules for classification: 1) Points; 2) Goal difference; 3) Number of goals scored; 4) Head-to-head results between tied teams; 5) Number of goals scored away; 6) Highest relegation coefficient; 7) Fair Play points
(C) Champions

==== Results summary ====
Overall								Home						Away					
Pld	W	D	L	GF	GA	GD	Pts	W	D	L	GF	GA	GD	W	D	L	GF	GA	GD
6	3	2	1	12	10	+2	11	2	1	0	9	5	+4	1	1	1	3	5	−2

Last updated: 24 August 2024.

==== Results by round ====
Round	1
Ground	
Result	
Position	

Updated to match(es) played on 24 August 2024. Source:
A = Away; H = Home; W = Win; D = Draw; L = Loss

==== Matches ====
The match schedule was released on 6 June 2024.

6 July 2024 1	Querétaro	1–2	Tijuana	Querétaro
19:00 UTC−6	Escamilla (yellow card) 45+3'; Sosa (yellow card) 54', (goal) 62'; Manzanarez (yellow card) 78'		González 21'; Blanco 68'	Stadium: Estadio Corregidora; Referee: Luis Alfredo García Rodríguez

13 July 2024 2	Tijuana	4–2	Guadalajara	Tijuana
				Stadium: Estadio Caliente

17 July 2024 3	Cruz Azul	3–0	Tijuana

20 July 2024 4	Atlético San Luis	1–1	Tijuana

19 August 2024 8	Tijuana	3–1	Juárez	Tijuana
				Stadium: Estadio Caliente

24 August 2024 5	Tijuana	2–2	Juárez	Tijuana
				Stadium: Estadio Caliente

30 August 2024 6	Tijuana	v	León	Tijuana
				Stadium: Estadio Caliente

=== Leagues Cup ===
==== Group stage ====
Pos	Team	Pld	W	PW	PL	L	GF	GA	GD	Pts	Qualification	VAN	LFC	TIJ
1	(Canadian Soccer Association) Vancouver Whitecaps FC	2	1	1	0	0	5	3	+2	5	Advance to knockout stage	—	—	3–1
2	(United States Soccer Federation) Los Angeles FC	2	1	0	1	0	5	2	+3	4	Advance to knockout stage	2–2	—	3–0
3	(Mexican Football Federation) Tijuana	2	0	0	0	2	1	6	−5	0		—	—	—

Source: Leagues Cup
Rules for classification: Tiebreakers

July 26, 2024	Los Angeles FC (United States)	3–0	(Mexico) Tijuana	BMO Stadium, Los Angeles, California
23:00 (20:00 UTC−7)	Olivera 9', 51'; Bouanga 43'	Report		Referee: Iván Barton (El Salvador)

August 3, 2024	Vancouver Whitecaps FC (Canada)	3–1	(Mexico) Tijuana	BC Place, Vancouver, British Columbia
22:00 (19:00 UTC−7)	Picault 49'; Johnson 77'; Vite 83'	Report	Castañeda 8'	Attendance: 18,896; Referee: Marco Ortiz (Mexico)
