= Aarón Mejía =

Mexican footballer (born 2001)

Personal information
- Full name: Aarón Mejía Montoya
- Date of birth: 6 June 2001 (age 25)
- Place of birth: Culiacán, Sinaloa, Mexico
- Height: 1.78 m (5 ft 10 in)
- Position: Right-back

Team information
- Current team: Tijuana
- Number: 18

Youth career
- 2015–2018: Sinaloa
- 2018–2020: Tijuana

Senior career*
Years	Team	Apps	(Gls)
2020–2023	Sinaloa	60	(1)
2023–	Tijuana	52	(0)
2026	→ América (loan)	5	(0)
- * Club domestic league appearances and goals as of 22 November 2026

Aarón Mejía Montoya (born 6 June 2001) is a Mexican professional footballer who plays as a right-back for Liga MX club América.

== Early life and career ==
Born in the city of Culiacán, Sinaloa, Mejía joined the academy of his local club Sinaloa in 2015. In 2018, Mejía joined the academy of Tijuana where he spent two and a half years developing before returning to Dorados.

On 6 October 2020, Mejía made his professional debut for Dorados, starting in a 2–2 draw to Pumas Tabasco. On 5 July 2022, Mejía scored his first goal for the club in a 2–1 defeat to Sonora. During his time at Dorados, he became a regular contributor in the defensive line.

In 2023, Mejía returned to Tijuana and made his top flight debut on 1 September, coming on as a substitute for Diego Barbosa in a 3–0 loss to Puebla. During his time with Los Xolos, Mejía made 53 appearances.

On 7 January 2026, Mejía joined América on loan.

== Career statistics ==
=== Club ===
As of 22 November 2026

Club	Season	League			Cup		Continental		Other		Total	
Club	Season	Division	Apps	Goals	Apps	Goals	Apps	Goals	Apps	Goals	Apps	Goals
Sinaloa	2020–21	Liga de Expansión MX	19	0	—		—		—		19	0
Sinaloa	2021–22	Liga de Expansión MX	7	0	—		—		—		7	0
Sinaloa	2022–23	Liga de Expansión MX	34	1	—		—		—		34	1
Sinaloa	Total		60	1	—		—		—		60	1
Tijuana	2023–24	Liga MX	11	0	—		—		—		11	0
Tijuana	2024–25	Liga MX	33	0	—		—		2 (Note: Appearances in Leagues Cup)	0	35	0
Tijuana	2025–26	Liga MX	6	0	—		—		1	0	7	0
Tijuana	2026–27	Liga MX	2	0	—		—		1	0	3	0
Tijuana	Total		52	0	—		—		4	0	53	0
América (loan)	2025–26	Liga MX	5	0	—		3 (Note: Appearances in CONCACAF Champions Cup)	0	—		8	0
Career total			117	1	—		3	0	4	0	124	1
