= Alejandro Zendejas =

Soccer player (born 1998)

- Zendejas with the United States in 2026

Personal information
- Full name: Alejandro Zendejas Saavedra
- Date of birth: February 7, 1998 (age 28)
- Place of birth: Ciudad Juárez, Chihuahua, Mexico
- Height: 5 ft 5 in (1.65 m)
- Position: Winger

Team information
- Current team: América
- Number: 10

Youth career
- 2012–2015: FC Dallas

Senior career*
Years	Team	Apps	(Gls)
2015–2016	FC Dallas	8	(0)
2016–2020	Guadalajara	8	(0)
2017–2018	→ Zacatepec (loan)	32	(4)
2020–2022	Necaxa	50	(11)
2022–	América	169	(49)

International career^{‡}
2013	United States U15	10	(2)
2013–2015	United States U17	27	(4)
2017	Mexico U21	1	(0)
2021	Mexico U23	3	(1)
2021–2022	Mexico	2	(0)
2023–	United States	15	(2)
Medal record
Men's soccer
Representing United States
CONCACAF Nations League
Winner	2023 United States
- * Club domestic league appearances and goals as of November 7, 2026 ‡ National team caps and goals as of June 25, 2026

Alejandro "Alex" Zendejas Saavedra (born February 7, 1998) is a professional soccer player who plays as a winger for Liga MX club América. Born in Mexico, he represents the United States national team.

== Early life ==
Zendejas was born in Ciudad Juárez, Chihuahua, Mexico, his parents Alfredo Zendejas and Mónica Saavedra are originally from Toluca, State of Mexico, he has two older siblings a sister named Ana Lucia and a brother named Alfredo Jr. When Zendejas was 6 months old his family moved to El Paso, Texas, where he was raised. He holds both U.S. and Mexican citizenship.

The MLS, U.S. Soccer, and FC Dallas websites all listed him as being born in El Paso, Texas, but FC Dallas later confirmed that Zendejas had been born in Mexico.

== Club career ==
=== FC Dallas ===
On October 1, 2014, Zendejas signed a homegrown player contract with FC Dallas, making him the 13th homegrown signing in club history. However, he was not eligible to play for the first team until the 2015 season. Zendejas made his professional debut on May 1, 2015, in a 4–1 victory over Houston Dynamo.

=== Guadalajara ===
==== 2016–17: Debut season, Copa MX title, and first league title ====
On June 23, 2016, Zendejas signed with Liga MX Guadalajara. In order to meet with the club's tradition of only using Mexican players, Zendejas agreed to reject future U.S. national team call-ups and accept Mexico national team call-ups if they ever occur. Zendejas was registered with the first team and was given the number 29 jersey, the same kit he had at Dallas. Zendejas made his Liga MX debut on August 6, in a match against Querétaro.

==== 2017–18: Loan to Zacatepec ====
In a press conference, Chivas coach Matías Almeyda confirmed some youth players would be sent out on loan to sister club Zacatepec to get playing time. On June 8, 2017, Zacatepec announced they had signed Zendejas on loan. Zendejas scored his first professional goal in a Copa MX match against Cruz Azul. He scored his first Ascenso MX goal on August 12, 2017, against Murciélagos F.C. Zacatepec would go on to win 1–0 with his goal.

=== Necaxa ===
On June 29, 2020, Zendejas joined Club Necaxa on a free transfer.

=== América ===
On January 17, 2022, Zendejas joined América for $3 million.

== International career ==
=== United States U15 and U17 ===
Zendejas was a member the United States under-17 squad that competed at the 2015 CONCACAF U-17 Championship playing alongside future USMNT stars Christian Pulisic and Tyler Adams. Overall, he gained 27 caps and scored four goals for the U-17 national team. After joining Mexican club C.D. Guadalajara, Zendejas agreed to reject future U.S. national team call-ups and accept Mexico national team call-ups if they occur.

=== Mexico ===
In August 2017, Zendejas was called up to the Mexico under-21 squad for games in China and Qatar, the start of preparation for the Olympics in Tokyo in 2020.

Zendejas received his first call-up to the national team by Gerardo Martino, and made his debut on October 27, 2021, in a friendly match against Ecuador, coming in as a substitute in the 65th minute for Uriel Antuna.

=== National team controversy ===
In late August 2022, FIFA issued an investigation probe on the Mexican Football Federation regarding Zendejas' call-ups to friendly matches in October 2021 and April 2022, against Ecuador and Guatemala respectively, the matches themselves were non-FIFA regulated matches but nevertheless, Zendejas' national team allegiance was still under the 'legal' jurisdiction of the United States Soccer Federation, meaning that Zendejas had taken part in friendly matches for Mexico without consulting or filing a one-time switch to FIFA in order to switch national team allegiances, a violation of FIFA regulations.

On November 9, 2022, Zendejas’ attorneys revealed to media that the player was considering representing the United States.

On January 19, 2023, FIFA ordered Mexico to forfeit two friendlies—a 3–2 loss against Ecuador on October 28, 2021, and a 0–0 draw with Guatemala on April 22, 2022— and pay a 10,000 Swiss Franc fine for using Zendejas in violation of regulations. The Mexico under-23 team was also ordered to forfeit three games in which Zendejas played.

=== United States ===
On January 17, 2023, Zendejas was included in the list of United States national team call ups for two friendlies against Serbia and Colombia.

In January 2023, Zendejas became the fifth player to earn caps for both national teams in the history of the Mexico–U.S. football rivalry and only the second Mexican-born to do so since Martín Vásquez.

On March 14, 2023, U.S. Soccer announced that Zendejas had officially committed to play internationally for the United States on a permanent basis.

On May 26, 2026, Zendejas was selected in the 26-man squad for the 2026 FIFA World Cup.

== Career statistics ==
=== Club ===
As of November 7, 2026

Appearances and goals by club, season and competition
Club	Season	League			National cup (Note: Includes U.S. Open Cup, Copa MX)		Continental		Other		Total	
Club	Season	Division	Apps	Goals	Apps	Goals	Apps	Goals	Apps	Goals	Apps	Goals
FC Dallas	2015	MLS	8	0	2	0	–		–		10	0
Guadalajara	2016–17	Liga MX	2	0	8	0	—		—		10	0
Guadalajara	2018–19	Liga MX	4	0	6	1	–		–		10	1
Guadalajara	2019–20	Liga MX	2	0	1	0	–		–		3	0
Guadalajara	Total		8	0	15	1	—		—		23	1
Zacatepec (loan)	2017–18	Ascenso MX	32	4	8	1	—		—		40	5
Necaxa	2020–21	Liga MX	32	5	—		–		–		32	5
Necaxa	2021–22	Liga MX	18	6	–		–		–		18	6
Necaxa	Total		50	11	—		—		—		50	11
América	2021–22	Liga MX	18	5	—		–		–		18	5
América	2022–23	Liga MX	34	10	–		–		2 (Note: Appearances in Leagues Cup)	0	36	10
América	2023–24	Liga MX	42	9	–		8 (Note: Appearances in CONCACAF Champions Cup)	5	4	1	54	15
América	2024–25	Liga MX	40	11	–		4	1	3 (Note: One appearance in Supercopa de la Liga MX, one appearance in Campeones Cup, one appearance in FIFA Club World Cup)	0	47	12
América	2025–26	Liga MX	28	12	–		5	0	4 (Note: three appearances in Leagues Cup, one appearance and one goal in Campeón de Campeones)	1	37	13
América	2026–27	Liga MX	7	2	–		0	0	–		7	2
América	Total		169	49	—		17	6	13	2	199	57
Career total			267	64	27	3	15	5	13	2	322	74

=== International ===
As of match played on June 25, 2026

Appearances and goals by national team and year
National team	Year	Apps	Goals
United States	2023	7	1
United States	2024	4	0
United States	2025	2	1
United States	2026	2	0
Total		15	2

Scores and results list the United States' goal tally first, score column indicates score after each Zendejas goal.

List of international goals scored by Alejandro Zendejas
No.	Date	Venue	Cap	Opponent	Score	Result	Competition
1	March 24, 2023	Kirani James Athletic Stadium, St. George's, Grenada	2	Grenada	7–1	7–1	2022–23 CONCACAF Nations League A
2	September 9, 2025	Lower.com Field, Columbus, United States	13	Japan	1–0	2–0	Friendly

== Honors ==
Guadalajara

- Liga MX: Clausura 2017
- Copa MX: Clausura 2017
- Supercopa MX: 2016

América

- Liga MX: Apertura 2023, Clausura 2024, Apertura 2024
- Campeón de Campeones: 2024
- Supercopa de la Liga MX: 2024
- Campeones Cup: 2024

United States

- CONCACAF Nations League: 2022–23

Individual

- CONCACAF Champions Cup Best XI: 2024
- Liga MX Player of the Month: January 2025
- Liga MX Goal of the Month: January 2025
- Liga MX All-Star: 2025
