= Igor Lichnovsky =

Chilean footballer (born 1994)

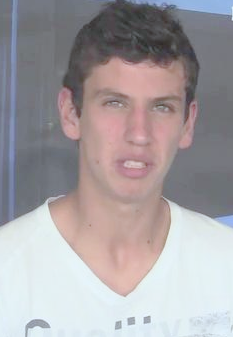
- Lichnovsky in 2012

Personal information
- Full name: Igor Lichnovsky Osorio
- Date of birth: 7 March 1994 (age 32)
- Place of birth: Peñaflor, Chile
- Height: 1.88 m (6 ft 2 in)
- Position: Centre-back

Team information
- Current team: Universidad de Chile
- Number: 3

Youth career
- 2002–2011: Universidad de Chile

Senior career*
Years	Team	Apps	(Gls)
2011–2014	Universidad de Chile	41	(4)
2014–2015	Porto B	41	(3)
2015–2017	Porto	0	(0)
2016	→ Sporting Gijón (loan)	2	(0)
2016–2017	→ Valladolid (loan)	18	(1)
2017–2018	Necaxa	34	(0)
2018–2020	Cruz Azul	62	(2)
2020–2022	Al Shabab	41	(3)
2022–2024	Tigres UANL	46	(1)
2023–2024	→ América (loan)	34	(2)
2024–2026	América	9	(1)
2026	Fatih Karagümrük	13	(0)
2026–	Universidad de Chile	2	(1)

International career^{‡}
2011	Chile U17	1	(0)
2013	Chile U20	11	(1)
2014–	Chile	17	(0)
- * Club domestic league appearances and goals as of 22:23, 13 September 2026 (UTC) ‡ National team caps and goals as of 21:30, 6 October 2026 (UTC)

Igor Lichnovsky Osorio (born 7 March 1994) is a Chilean professional footballer who plays as a central defender for Universidad de Chile and the Chile national team.

== Club career ==
=== Universidad de Chile ===
Born in Peñaflor near Santiago to an Austrian father of German and Slovak descent, Lichnovsky joined Club Universidad de Chile at the age of 8. On 20 November 2011 he first appeared in the Primera División, playing the full 90 minutes in a 0–0 home draw against Club Deportivo Universidad Católica for the Clausura in which he was also voted as Player of the match.

Lichnovsky scored his first goal as a professional on 29 April 2012, contributing to a 5–0 derby home win over Colo-Colo.

=== Porto ===
Lichnovsky's good performances for both Universidad and the Chilean national youth teams attracted interest from English club Chelsea. However, nothing came of it, and in late June 2014 he signed a four-year contract with FC Porto from Portugal, being initially assigned to the B team.

Lichnovsky played his first competitive match on 17 October 2015, in a 2–0 win at Varzim S.C. in the third round of the Taça de Portugal. On 22 January of the following year he was loaned to Sporting de Gijón until June, making his La Liga debut on 17 February by featuring the entire 1–3 home loss against FC Barcelona.

On 2 August 2016, Lichnovsky returned to Spain, joining Segunda División team Real Valladolid on another loan. He scored his only goal in the country on 3 September when he opened a 2–1 home victory over Girona FC in the third minute.

=== Mexico ===
On 21 June 2017, Lichnovsky moved to the third continent of his career by joining Club Necaxa. He made his Liga MX debut on 24 July in a 2–0 win at C.D. Veracruz, and was ever-present over the season for the team from Aguascalientes City.

Lichnovsky transferred to Cruz Azul of the same league in May 2018. He scored his first goal in Mexican football the following 31 March, to secure a 2–2 draw away to C.F. Monterrey.

=== Later career ===
On 10 October 2020, Lichnovsky signed with Al Shabab Club of the Saudi Pro League. In January 2022, he returned to Mexico with Tigres UANL, being loaned to fellow top-tier side Club América in September 2023 and bought outright by the latter in July 2024.

On 6 February 2026, Lichnovsky joined Turkish Süper Lig club Fatih Karagümrük S.K. on a one-and-a-half-year deal. He returned to Universidad in August, on a two-and-a-half-year contract.

== International career ==
Lichnovsky was capped by Chile at under-17 and under-20 levels. He participated with the latter in the 2013 South American Youth Championship, helping his team qualify to the 2013 FIFA World Cup in Turkey whilst acting as captain in both tournaments.

Lichnovsky made his debut with the full side on 14 November 2014, playing the entire 5–0 friendly win with Venezuela at the Estadio CAP in Talcahuano. He did not make his second appearance until 27 March 2018, in a goalless exhibition away to Denmark.

Manager Reinaldo Rueda called Lichnovsky up for the 2019 Copa América in Brazil. He played one match as a substitute for his competitive debut for the fourth-place finishers, as a 55th-minute replacement for Gary Medel in a 1–0 group loss against Uruguay in the Maracanã Stadium.

== Career statistics ==
=== Club ===
As of match played 13 September 2026

Appearances and goals by club, season and competition
Club	Season	League			National cup (Note: Includes Copa Chile, Taça de Portugal, Copa del Rey, King's Cup, Copa MX)		Continental		Other		Total	
Club	Season	Division	Apps	Goals	Apps	Goals	Apps	Goals	Apps	Goals	Apps	Goals
Universidad de Chile	2011	Liga de Primera	4	0	—		—		—		4	0
Universidad de Chile	2012	Liga de Primera	13	2	4	0	3 (Note: Two appearances in Copa Libertadores, one appearance in Copa Sudamericana)	0	—		20	2
Universidad de Chile	2013	Liga de Primera	5	0	0	0	—		—		5	0
Universidad de Chile	2013–14	Liga de Primera	19	2	0	0	3 (Note: Appearances in Copa Libertadores)	0	2 (Note: Appearances in Pre-Libertadores tournament)	0	24	2
Universidad de Chile	Total		41	4	4	0	6	0	2	0	53	4
Porto B	2014–15	Liga Portugal 2	37	3	—		—		—		37	3
Porto B	2015–16	Liga Portugal 2	4	0	—		—		—		4	0
Porto B	Total		41	3	—		—		—		41	3
Porto	2015–16	Primeira Liga	0	0	2	0	0	0	1 (Note: Appearance in Taça da Liga)	0	3	0
Sporting Gijón (loan)	2015–16	La Liga	2	0	—		—		—		2	0
Valladolid (loan)	2016–17	Segunda División	18	1	1	0	—		—		19	1
Nexaca	2017–18	Liga MX	34	0	3	0	—		—		37	0
Cruz Azul	2018–19	Liga MX	34	1	10	0	—		—		44	1
Cruz Azul	2019–20	Liga MX	17	1	0	0	—		4 (Note: Three appearances in Leagues Cup, one appearance in Supercopa MX)	0	21	1
Cruz Azul	2020–21	Liga MX	11	0	0	0	—		0	0	11	0
Cruz Azul	Total		62	2	10	0	—		4	0	76	2
Al Shabab	2020–21	Saudi Pro League	26	3	0	0	—		—		26	3
Al Shabab	2021–22	Saudi Pro League	15	0	1	0	—		—		16	0
Al Shabab	Total		41	3	1	0	—		—		42	3
Tigres UANL	2021–22	Liga MX	11	1	—		—		—		11	1
Tigres UANL	2022–23	Liga MX	35	0	0	0	6 (Note: Appearances in CONCACAF Champions Cup)	0	—		41	0
Tigres UANL	Total		46	1	0	0	6	0	—		52	1
América (loan)	2023–24	Liga MX	34	2	—		7	0	—		41	2
América	2024–25	Liga MX	1	0	—		—		3 (Note: Appearances in Leagues Cup)	0	4	0
América	2025–26	Liga MX	8	1	—		—		3 (Note: Two appearances in Leagues Cup, one appearance in Campeón de Campeones)	0	11	1
América	Total		43	3	—		7	0	6	0	56	3
Fatih Karagümrük	2025–26	Süper Lig	13	0	—		—		—		13	0
Universidad de Chile	2026	Liga de Primera	2	1	1	0	—		—		3	1
Career total			343	18	22	0	19	0	13	0	397	18

=== International ===
As of match played 6 October 2026

Appearances and goals by national team and year
National team	Year	Apps	Goals
Chile	2014	1	0
Chile	2015	0	0
Chile	2016	0	0
Chile	2017	0	0
Chile	2018	4	0
Chile	2019	2	0
Chile	2020	0	0
Chile	2021	0	0
Chile	2022	0	0
Chile	2023	0	0
Chile	2024	6	0
Chile	2025	1	0
Chile	2026	3	0
Total		17	0

== Honours ==
Universidad de Chile

- Chilean Primera División: Clausura 2011, Apertura 2012
- Copa Chile: 2012–13
- Copa Sudamericana: 2011

Necaxa

- Copa MX: Clausura 2018

Cruz Azul

- Copa MX: Apertura 2018
- Supercopa MX: 2019
- Leagues Cup: 2019

UANL

- Liga MX: Clausura 2023

América

- Liga MX: Apertura 2023, Clausura 2024, Apertura 2024
- Campeón de Campeones: 2024
