= Patricio Salas (footballer, born 2004) =

Mexican footballer (born 2004)

Personal information
- Full name: Patricio Salas Quintal
- Date of birth: 17 February 2004 (age 22)
- Place of birth: Mérida, Yucatán, Mexico
- Height: 1.80 m (5 ft 11 in)
- Position: Forward

Team information
- Current team: Famalicão (on loan from América)
- Number: 33

Youth career
- 2015–2017: Venados
- 2017: Chelsea
- 2017–2018: Buckswood FA
- 2018–2019: Pachuca
- 2019–2020: Buckswood FA
- 2020–2022: Pachuca
- 2022–2023: América

Senior career*
Years	Team	Apps	(Gls)
2023–	América	30	(3)
2026–	→ Famalicão (loan)	0	(0)
- * Club domestic league appearances and goals as of 2 September 2026

Patricio Salas Quintal (born 17 February 2004) is a Mexican professional footballer who plays as a forward for Primeira Liga club Famalicão, on loan from Liga MX club América.

== Club career ==
Born in Mérida in the Mexican state of Yucatán, Salas began his career playing football at the Colegio Montejo and Centro Universitario Montejo, before spending two years in the academy of professional side Venados. He moved to England in 2017, spending six months with Premier League side Chelsea, before enrolling at the Buckswood Football Academy in Hastings. He returned to Mexico in July 2018, joining the academy of Pachuca. However, he spent the 2019–20 season back with the Buckswood Football Academy, making thirty-seven appearances for the school team.

He returned to Mexico again in 2020, rejoining Pachuca, before joining América in mid-2022. Initially injured on his arrival to the club, he only started four of the eight games he played, without scoring, but impressed coaches nonetheless. The following year, after two goals in eleven games for the youth team, he was integrated into the first-team squad, and made his debut on 16 July, coming on as a late substitute for Julián Quiñones in a 3–0 win against Puebla.

On 2 September 2026, Salas was loaned out to Primeira Liga club Famalicão.

== International career ==
Salas participated in a micro-cycle with the Mexico national under-17 football team in late 2020.

== Career statistics ==
=== Club ===
As of 2 September 2026

Appearances and goals by club, season and competition
Club	Season	League			Cup		Continental		Other		Total	
Club	Season	Division	Apps	Goals	Apps	Goals	Apps	Goals	Apps	Goals	Apps	Goals
América	2023–24	Liga MX	4	0	—		—		—		4	0
América	2024–25	Liga MX	3	0	—		—		—		3	0
América	2025–26	Liga MX	21	3	—		4 (Note: Appearances in CONCACAF Champions Cup)	0	—		25	3
América	2026–27	Liga MX	2	0	—		—		1 (Note: Appearance in Leagues Cup)	0	3	0
Career total			30	3	0	0	4	0	1	0	35	3

== Honours ==
América

- Primera División Liga MX: AP.2023
- Primera División Liga MX: CL.2024
- Primera División Liga MX: AP.2024
- Supercopa de la Liga MX: 2024
- Campeón de Campeones 2024–25
- Campeones Cup 2024
