= Fernando Tapia =

Mexican footballer (born 2001)

Personal information
- Full name: Fernando Tapia Méndez
- Date of birth: 17 June 2001 (age 25)
- Place of birth: Villahermosa, Tabasco, Mexico
- Height: 1.82 m (6 ft 0 in)
- Position: Goalkeeper

Team information
- Current team: América
- Number: 21

Youth career
- 2014–2022: América

Senior career*
Years	Team	Apps	(Gls)
2022–2023	América	0	(0)
2023	→ Venados (loan)	11	(0)
2023	→ Quéretaro (loan)	5	(0)
2024–2025	Quéretaro	10	(0)
2024–2025	→ UANL (loan)	3	(0)
2026–	América	2	(0)

International career
2023–	Mexico U23	8	(0)
Medal record
Men's football
Representing Mexico
Pan American Games
Bronze medal – third place	2023 Santiago	Team
Central American and Caribbean Games
Gold medal – first place	2023 San Salvador	Team
- * Club domestic league appearances and goals as of 6 September 2026

Fernando Tapia Méndez (born 17 June 2001) is a Mexican professional footballer who plays as a goalkeeper for Liga MX club América.

== Club career ==
On 1 July 2022, América included Tapia in their official roster for Clausura 2022 having been assigned jersey number 35.

== International career ==
In June 2024, he took part in the Maurice Revello Tournament in France with Mexico.

== Career statistics ==
=== Club ===
As of match played on 6 September 2026

Club	Season	League			Cup		Continental		Other		Total	
Club	Season	Division	Apps	Goals	Apps	Goals	Apps	Goals	Apps	Goals	Apps	Goals
Venados (loan)	2022–23	Liga de Expansión MX	11	0	—		—		—		11	0
Quéretaro (loan)	2022–23	Liga MX	5	0	—		—		—		5	0
Quéretaro	2023–24	Liga MX	10	0	—		—		4 (Note: Appearances in Leagues Cup)	0	14	0
UANL (loan)	2024–25	Liga MX	3	0	—		1 (Note: Appearances in CONCACAF Champions Cup)	0	—		4	0
América	2026–27	Liga MX	2	0	—		—		1	0	3	0
Career total			31	0	0	0	1	0	5	0	37	0

== Honours ==
Mexico U23

- Central American and Caribbean Games: Gold Medal 2023
- Pan American Games: Bronze Medal2023

Individual

- Liga MX All-Star: 2024
