= Rodrigo Parra =

Mexican footballer

Personal information
- Full name: Rodrigo Parra Arteaga
- Date of birth: 28 November 2007 (age 18)
- Place of birth: Mexico City, Mexico
- Height: 1.86 m (6 ft 1 in)
- Position: Goalkeeper

Team information
- Current team: Pumas UNAM
- Number: 181

Youth career
- Cruz Azul
- 2024–: Pumas UNAM

Senior career*
Years	Team	Apps	(Gls)
2025–	Pumas UNAM	2	(0)
- * Club domestic league appearances and goals as of 31 August 2026

Rodrigo "Deidad" Parra Arteaga (born 28 November 2007) is a Mexican footballer who plays as a goalkeeper for Liga MX club Pumas UNAM.

== Career ==
Parra played for the youth teams of Cruz Azul, before joining the Pumas UNAM youth academy in July 2024.

Parra made his debut for the first team on 12 July 2025 in a Liga MX match vs. Santos Laguna after Pumas first-choice goalkeeper Alex Padilla rejoined Athletic Bilbao. In his debut, he was lobbed from over 30 yards out by Aldo López in the first half, before committing a turnover in the second half that led directly to a goal from Ramiro Sordo.

== Career statistics ==
=== Club ===
As of 11 October 2026

Club	Season	League			Cup		Continental		Other		Total	
Club	Season	Division	Apps	Goals	Apps	Goals	Apps	Goals	Apps	Goals	Apps	Goals
Pumas UNAM	2025–26	Liga MX	2	0	—		—		—		2	0
Career total			2	0	0	0	0	0	0	0	2	0
