= Brian Rodríguez =

Uruguayan footballer (born 2000)

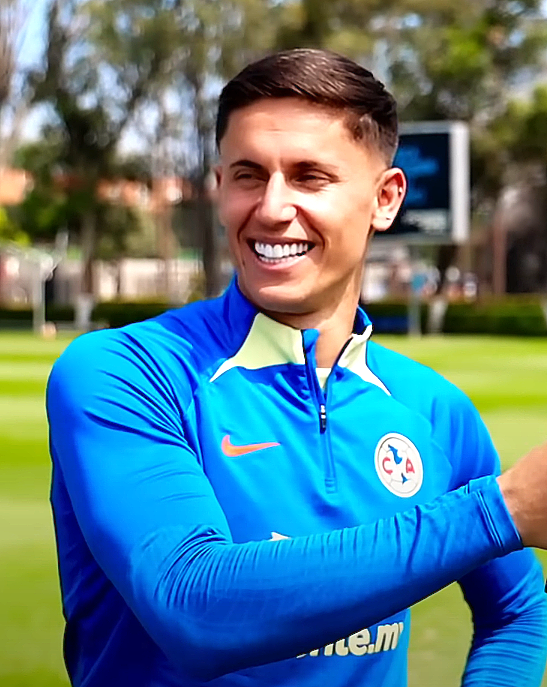
- Rodríguez with América in 2023

Personal information
- Full name: Paul Brian Rodríguez Bravo
- Date of birth: 20 May 2000 (age 26)
- Place of birth: Tranqueras, Uruguay
- Height: 1.75 m (5 ft 9 in)
- Position: Winger

Team information
- Current team: América
- Number: 7

Youth career
- Peñarol

Senior career*
Years	Team	Apps	(Gls)
2018–2019	Peñarol	18	(3)
2019–2022	Los Angeles FC	55	(8)
2021	→ Almería (loan)	16	(0)
2022–	América	130	(36)

International career^{‡}
2016–2017	Uruguay U17	3	(0)
2018–2019	Uruguay U20	19	(6)
2019–	Uruguay	37	(4)
Medal record
Men's football
Representing Uruguay
Copa América
Third place	2024 United States
- * Club domestic league appearances and goals as of 21 October 2026 ‡ National team caps and goals as of 28 September 2026

Paul Brian Rodríguez Bravo (born 20 May 2000) is a Uruguayan professional footballer who plays as a winger for Liga MX club América and the Uruguay national team.

== Club career ==
=== Peñarol ===
A youth academy product of Peñarol, Rodríguez made his professional debut on 27 March 2018 in a league match against Danubio. He came on as a 59th minute substitute for Giovanni González as the match eventually ended in a 1–1 draw. He scored his first goal on 24 May 2018 in a 3–0 league win against Boston River. He scored three goals from 26 matches in total before leaving the club in August 2019.

=== Los Angeles ===
On 7 August 2019, MLS club Los Angeles FC announced the signing of Rodríguez as a young designated player for a reported fee of $11.5 million. He made his club debut on 26 August 2019 in El Tráfico derby against LA Galaxy. He came on as a 61st minute substitute for Carlos Vela as the match eventually ended in a 3–3 draw.

==== Loan to Almería ====
On 1 February 2021, Rodríguez moved on loan to Segunda División side Almería. The deal gave Almería an option to make the deal permanent following his loan spell. On 15 July 2021, LAFC announced Rodríguez had returned to the MLS club.

=== América ===
On 24 August 2022, Rodríguez joined Liga MX club América for a reported $6 million transfer fee.

== International career ==
Rodríguez is a current Uruguay international and was part of under-20 and under-17 teams in the past. He has represented his nation at the 2019 FIFA U-20 World Cup which took place at Poland, where he scored two goals and provided one assist from four matches.

In August 2019, he was called up to the senior team for first time to take part in friendlies against Costa Rica and USA. He made his international debut on 7 September 2019, playing whole 90 minutes in 2–1 win against Costa Rica. He scored his first international goal four days later in 1–1 draw against USA.

On 31 May 2026, Rodríguez was named in Uruguay's 26-man squad for the 2026 FIFA World Cup.

== Career statistics ==
=== Club ===
As of 6 August 2025

Appearances and goals by club, season and competition
Club	Season	League			Cup		Continental		Other		Total	
Club	Season	Division	Apps	Goals	Apps	Goals	Apps	Goals	Apps	Goals	Apps	Goals
Peñarol	2018	Uruguayan Primera División	6	1	—		0	0	—		6	1
Peñarol	2019	Uruguayan Primera División	12	2	—		8 (Note: Six appearances in Copa Libertadores and two appearances in Copa Sudamericana.)	0	—		20	2
Peñarol	Total		18	3	—		8	0	—		26	3
Los Angeles FC	2019	MLS	7	0	0	0	—		2 (Note: Appearances in MLS Cup Playoffs.)	0	9	0
Los Angeles FC	2020	MLS	19 (Note: Includes three appearances and one goal in MLS is Back Tournament group stage.)	2	—		4 (Note: Appearances in CONCACAF Champions League.)	0	2 (Note: Appearances in MLS is Back Tournament knockout stage.)	1	25	3
Los Angeles FC	2021	MLS	15	4	—		—		—		15	4
Los Angeles FC	2022	MLS	14	2	1	0	—		—		15	2
Los Angeles FC	Total		55	8	1	0	4	0	4	1	64	9
UD Almería (loan)	2020–21	Segunda División	16	0	—		—		—		16	0
Club América	2022–23	Liga MX	22	4	—		—		1 (Note: Appearances in Leagues Cup.)	0	22	4
Club América	2023–24	Liga MX	32	5	—		7	2	4	0	43	7
Club América	2024–25	Liga MX	30	9	—		4	1	5 (Note: One appearance and one goal in FIFA Club World Cup play-in, one appearance in Campeones Cup, three appearances and two goals in Leagues Cup)	3	39	13
Club América	2025–26	Liga MX	3	2	—		—		4 (Note: One appearance in Campeón de Campeones, three appearances and one goal in Leagues Cup)	1	7	3
Club América	Total		87	20	0	0	11	3	14	4	111	27
Career total			176	31	1	0	23	3	18	5	217	39

=== International ===
As of match played on 28 September 2026

Appearances and goals by national team and year
National team	Year	Apps	Goals
Uruguay	2019	6	3
Uruguay	2020	3	0
Uruguay	2021	8	0
Uruguay	2023	4	1
Uruguay	2024	5	0
Uruguay	2025	5	0
Uruguay	2026	6	0
Total		37	4

Scores and results list Uruguay's goal tally first, score column indicates score after each Rodríguez goal.

No	Date	Venue	Opponent	Score	Result	Competition
1.	10 September 2019	Busch Stadium, St. Louis, United States	United States	1–0	1–1	Friendly
2.	11 October 2019	Estadio Centenario, Montevideo, Uruguay	Peru	1–0	1–0	Friendly
3.	15 November 2019	Puskás Aréna, Budapest, Hungary	Hungary	2–0	2–1	Friendly
4.	14 June 2023	Estadio Centenario, Montevideo, Uruguay	Nicaragua	4–0	4–1	Friendly

== Honours ==
Los Angeles FC

- Supporters' Shield: 2019

América

- Liga MX: Apertura 2023, Clausura 2024, Apertura 2024
- Campeón de Campeones: 2024
- Campeones Cup: 2024

Uruguay

- Copa América third place: 2024

Individual

- Liga MX All-Star: 2025, 2026
- Liga MX Player of the Month: August 2026
