= Agustín Mulet =

Argentine professional footballer

Personal information
- Full name: Agustín Nicolás Mulet
- Date of birth: 22 February 2000 (age 26)
- Place of birth: Lomas del Mirador, Argentina
- Height: 1.83 m (6 ft 0 in)
- Position: Midfielder

Team information
- Current team: Cerro (on loan from Vélez Sarsfield)
- Number: 21

Youth career
- Club La Loma
- San Martín de Liniers
- Vélez Sarsfield

Senior career*
Years	Team	Apps	(Gls)
2020–	Vélez Sarsfield	40	(1)
2023	→ Independiente (loan)	13	(0)
2024	→ Cobreloa (loan)	6	(0)
2024	→ Independiente Rivadavia (loan)	11	(0)
2025–	→ Cerro (loan)	5	(0)
- * Club domestic league appearances and goals as of 17:16, 29 May 2025 (UTC)

Agustín Nicolás Mulet (born 22 February 2000) is an Argentine professional footballer who plays as a midfielder for Cerro, on loan from Vélez Sarsfield.

== Career ==
Mulet started out in the youth ranks of Club La Loma, before heading to San Martín de Liniers and subsequently Vélez Sarsfield; aged nine. Aged twenty, Mulet made the breakthrough into the club's first-team squad under manager Mauricio Pellegrino in 2020. After being an unused substitute for a Copa de la Liga Profesional first group stage draw with Patronato on 5 December, the central midfielder made his senior debut in a Copa Sudamericana quarter-final first leg home loss to Universidad Católica on 8 December; appearing for eighty-six minutes, prior to being subbed off for Agustín Bouzat.

Mulet scored his first goal on 10 January versus Godoy Cruz, netting the winner in a 3–2 win in the Copa de la Liga Profesional.

In 2024, he moved to Chile and joined on loan from Vélez Sarsfield to Cobreloa in the top division.

== Career statistics ==
As of 11 January 2021.

Appearances and goals by club, season and competition
Club	Season	League			Cup		League Cup		Continental		Other		Total	
Club	Season	Division	Apps	Goals	Apps	Goals	Apps	Goals	Apps	Goals	Apps	Goals	Apps	Goals
Vélez Sarsfield	2020–21 (Note: Soccerway counts Copa de la Liga Profesional appearances as league appearances.)	Primera División	4	1	0	0	0	0	1 (Note: Appearance(s) in the Copa Sudamericana)	0	0	0	5	1
Career total			4	1	0	0	0	0	1	0	0	0	5	1
