= Ralph Orquin =

American soccer player

Personal information
- Full name: Ralph Orquin
- Date of birth: April 15, 2003 (age 23)
- Place of birth: Texas, United States
- Height: 1.80 m (5 ft 11 in)
- Position: Left-back

Team information
- Current team: Cruz Azul
- Number: 15

Senior career*
Years	Team	Apps	(Gls)
2023–2026	América	2	(0)
2024–2025	→ Juárez (loan)	44	(0)
2026–	Cruz Azul	0	(0)
- * Club domestic league appearances and goals as of September 11, 2026

Ralph Orquin (born April 15, 2003) is an American professional soccer player who plays as a left-back for Liga MX club Cruz Azul.

== Club career ==
Orquín began his development in Club América's youth ranks, a club he joined at the age of nine. However, it was at FC Juárez where he made his debut, in the Clausura 2024. After his time at Juárez, Orquín returned to América for the Apertura 2025. He saw playing time at the start of the tournament, though as the matchdays went by he gradually lost his spot in the team's rotation. After turning down a contract renewal, he left the club at the end of the Clausura 2026.

On September 10, 2026, Orquín signed with Cruz Azul as a free agent.

== International career ==
Orquin was part of the United States under-16 team that trained in California under the direction of Landon Donovan.

== Career statistics ==
As of match played on August 6, 2025

Club	Season	League			Cup		Continental		Other		Total	
Club	Season	Division	Apps	Goals	Apps	Goals	Apps	Goals	Apps	Goals	Apps	Goals
América	2023–24	Liga MX	0	0	—		—		0	0	0	0
América	2024–25	Liga MX	0	0	—		—		0	0	0	0
América	2025–26	Liga MX	2	0	—		—		1 (Note: Appearances in Leagues Cup)	0	3	0
América	Total		2	0	—		—		1	0	3	0
Juárez (loan)	2023–24	Liga MX	9	0	—		—		—		9	0
Juárez (loan)	2024–25	Liga MX	35	0	—		—		3	0	38	0
Juárez (loan)	Total		44	0	—		—		3	0	47	0
Cruz Azul	2026–27	Liga MX	0	0	—		0	0	0	0	0	0
Career total			46	0	0	0	0	0	4	0	50	0

== Honors ==
América

- Liga MX: Apertura 2023
