= Sebastián Cáceres =

Uruguayan footballer (born 1999)

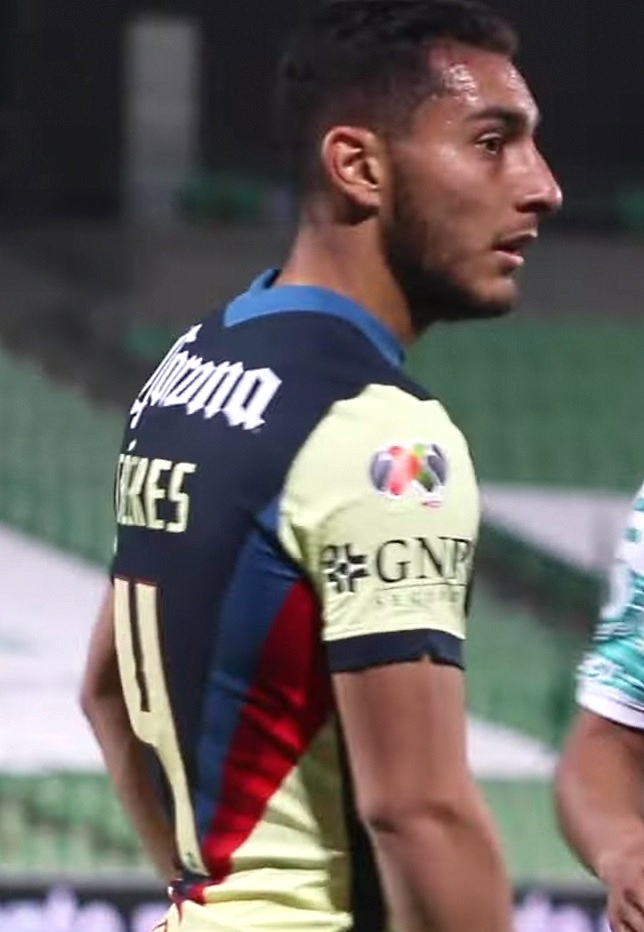
- Cáceres with América in 2021

Personal information
- Full name: Sebastián Enzo Cáceres Ramos
- Date of birth: 18 August 1999 (age 27)
- Place of birth: Montevideo, Uruguay
- Height: 1.80 m (5 ft 11 in)
- Position: Centre-back

Team information
- Current team: Celta
- Number: 21

Youth career
- Liverpool Montevideo

Senior career*
| Years | Team | Apps | (Gls) |
| 2017–2020 | Liverpool Montevideo | 63 | (1) |
| 2020–2026 | América | 171 | (2) |
| 2026– | Celta | 2 | (0) |

International career^{‡}
| 2017 | Uruguay U18 | 8 | (0) |
| 2018–2019 | Uruguay U20 | 18 | (0) |
| 2019 | Uruguay U22 | 5 | (0) |
| 2020 | Uruguay U23 | 4 | (0) |
| 2022– | Uruguay | 29 | (0) |
Medal record
Men's football
Representing Uruguay
Copa América
| Third place | 2024 United States |
- * Club domestic league appearances and goals as of 29 August 2026 ‡ National team caps and goals as of 18 November 2026

Sebastián Enzo Cáceres Ramos (born 18 August 1999) is a Uruguayan professional footballer who plays as a centre-back for La Liga club Celta Vigo and the Uruguay national team.

== Early life ==
Cáceres was born on 18 August 1999 in the Nuevo París neighborhood of the capital city Montevideo.

== Personal life ==
Cáceres is romantically involved and engaged with Mexican boxer and influencer Alana Flores.

== Club career ==
=== Liverpool Montevideo ===
Cáceres made his professional debut on 26 August 2017 in a 2–1 loss against Peñarol. He scored his first goal on 24 February 2019 in a 4–4 draw against Fénix.

=== América ===
On 15 January 2020, Cáceres signed for Liga MX club América.

=== Celta ===
On 1 September 2026, La Liga side Celta Vigo announced the signing of Cáceres on a four-year contract.

== International career ==
Cáceres is a former Uruguay youth international. He has represented Uruguay at the 2019 South American U-20 Championship, 2019 FIFA U-20 World Cup and 2019 Pan American Games.

In September 2022, Cáceres was called up to the Uruguay national team for the first time. He made his debut on 23 September 2022 in a 1–0 defeat against Iran. On 31 May 2026, he was named in Uruguay's 26-man squad for the 2026 FIFA World Cup.

== Career statistics ==
=== Club ===
As of 20 December 2020

Appearances and goals by club, season and competition
| Club | Season | League | | | Cup | | Continental | | Other | | Total | |
| Club | Season | Division | Apps | Goals | Apps | Goals | Apps | Goals | Apps | Goals | Apps | Goals |
|---|---|---|---|---|---|---|---|---|---|---|---|---|
| Liverpool Montevideo | 2017 | Uruguayan Primera División | 6 | 0 | — | | 0 | 0 | — | | 6 | 0 |
| Liverpool Montevideo | 2018 | Uruguayan Primera División | 32 | 0 | — | | — | | — | | 32 | 0 |
| Liverpool Montevideo | 2019 | Uruguayan Primera División | 24 | 1 | — | | 1 (Note: Appearance in Copa Sudamericana) | 0 | 1 (Note: Appearance in Torneo Intermedio final) | 0 | 26 | 1 |
| Liverpool Montevideo | Total | | 62 | 1 | 0 | 0 | 1 | 0 | 1 | 0 | 64 | 1 |
| América | 2019–20 | Liga MX | 1 | 0 | — | | 2 (Note: Appearances in CONCACAF Champions League) | 1 | — | | 3 | 1 |
| América | 2020–21 | Liga MX | 13 | 0 | — | | 0 | 0 | 2 (Note: Appearances in Apertura Liguilla) | 0 | 15 | 0 |
| América | Total | | 14 | 0 | 0 | 0 | 2 | 1 | 2 | 0 | 18 | 1 |
| Career total | | | 76 | 1 | 0 | 0 | 3 | 1 | 3 | 0 | 82 | 2 |

=== International ===
As of match played 17 November 2026

Appearances and goals by national team and year
| National team | Year | Apps | Goals |
|---|---|---|---|
| Uruguay | 2022 | 2 | 0 |
| Uruguay | 2023 | 7 | 0 |
| Uruguay | 2024 | 10 (Note: Includes a Non-FIFA friendly played against the Basque Country, which is counted as an official match by the Uruguayan Football Association.) | 0 |
| Uruguay | 2025 | 4 | 0 |
| Uruguay | 2026 | 6 | 0 |
| Total | | 29 | 0 |

== Honours ==
América

- Liga MX: Apertura 2023, Clausura 2024, Apertura 2024
- Campeón de Campeones: 2024
- Campeones Cup: 2024

Uruguay

- Copa América third place: 2024
