= Eduardo Armenta =

Mexican footballer (born 2001)

Personal information
- Full name: Eduardo Alonso Armenta Palma
- Date of birth: 16 December 2001 (age 24)
- Place of birth: Salvador Alvarado, Sinaloa, Mexico
- Height: 1.74 m (5 ft 9 in)
- Position: Midfielder

Team information
- Current team: Puebla
- Number: 14

Youth career
- 2019: Sinaloa
- 2019–2022: Tijuana

Senior career*
Years	Team	Apps	(Gls)
2022	Sinaloa	10	(5)
2023–2026	Tijuana	38	(0)
2025–2026	→ Querétaro (loan)	18	(0)
2026–	Puebla	7	(1)

International career
2023–	Mexico U23	6	(0)
Medal record
Men's football
Representing Mexico
Central American and Caribbean Games
Gold medal – first place	2023 San Salvador	Team
- * Club domestic league appearances and goals as of 20 November 2026

Eduardo Alonso Armenta Palma (born 16 December 2001) is a Mexican professional footballer who plays as a midfielder for Liga MX club Puebla.

== Career statistics ==
=== Club ===
As of match played on 20 November 2026

Club	Season	League			Cup		Continental		Other		Total	
Club	Season	Division	Apps	Goals	Apps	Goals	Apps	Goals	Apps	Goals	Apps	Goals
Sinaloa	2018–19	Ascenso MX	—		1	0	—		—		1	0
Sinaloa	2022–23	Liga de Expansión MX	10	5	—		—		—		10	5
Sinaloa	Total		10	5	1	0	—		—		11	5
Tijuana	2022–23	Liga MX	10	0	—		—		—		10	0
Tijuana	2023–24	Liga MX	27	0	—		—		1 (Note: Appearance in Leagues Cup)	0	28	0
Tijuana	2024–25	Liga MX	1	0	—		—		—		1	0
Tijuana	Total		38	0	—		—		1	0	39	0
Querétaro (loan)	2024–25	Liga MX	6	0	—		—		—		6	0
Querétaro (loan)	2025–26	Liga MX	12	0	—		—		2	0	14	0
Querétaro (loan)	Total		18	0	—		—		2	0	20	0
Puebla	2026–27	Liga MX	7	1	—		—		—		7	1
Career total			73	6	1	0	0	0	3	0	76	6

== Honours ==
Mexico U23

- Central American and Caribbean Games: 2023
