= Raúl Zúñiga =

Colombian footballer

Personal information
- Full name: Juan Manuel Zapata Zumaque
- Date of birth: 13 July 1994 (age 32)
- Place of birth: Juradó, Chocó, Colombia
- Height: 1.80 m (5 ft 11 in)
- Position: Forward

Team information
- Current team: América
- Number: 19

Senior career*
| Years | Team | Apps | (Gls) |
| 2019 | UAEM | 12 | (6) |
| 2019–2022 | Dorados | 87 | (38) |
| 2023–2024 | Querétaro | 29 | (8) |
| 2024–2025 | Tijuana | 42 | (15) |
| 2025– | América | 12 | (3) |
- * Club domestic league appearances and goals as of 20:25, 27 July 2025 (UTC)

José Raúl Zúñiga Murillo (born 13 July 1994) is a Colombian professional footballer who plays as a forward for Liga MX club América.

== Career ==
=== Early career ===
He made his professional debut at 25 years old in Mexico, after searching for opportunities in Argentina, Germany and his native Colombia.

He played his first game on 2 August 2019 for Potros UAEM against Correcaminos UAT, scoring twice in a 4–0 win.

=== Querétaro ===
After his spell at Dorados de Sinaloa in Liga de Expansión MX, Zúñiga moved up to Liga MX to sign for Querétaro.

=== Tijuana ===
On 11 January 2024, Club Tijuana announced they had signed Zúñiga. He scored his first goal for the club in a 1–0 away win against Juárez on 14 April 2024.

=== Club América ===
On 13 July 2025, Zuñiga joined América.
