= Ramiro Sordo =

Argentine footballer

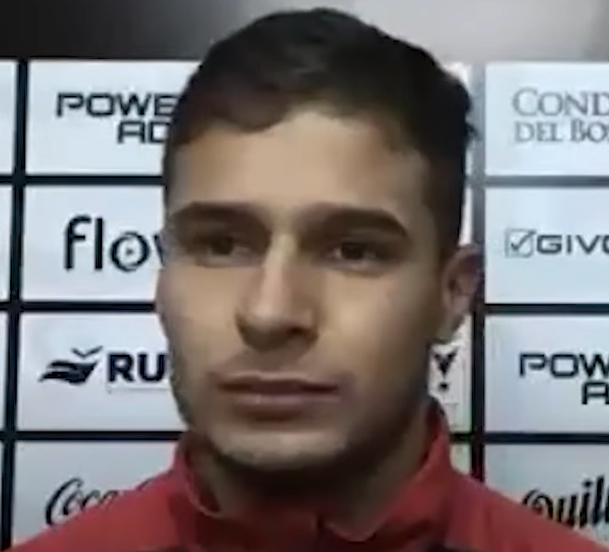
- 2022

Personal information
- Full name: Ramiro Gabriel Sordo
- Date of birth: 29 June 2000 (age 26)
- Place of birth: Las Rosas, Argentina
- Height: 1.74 m (5 ft 9 in)
- Position: Winger

Team information
- Current team: Santos Laguna
- Number: 26

Youth career
- Belgrano (Las Rosas)
- 2012–2020: Newell's Old Boys

Senior career*
Years	Team	Apps	(Gls)
2020–2023	Newell's Old Boys	55	(8)
2024–	Santos Laguna	44	(6)
- * Club domestic league appearances and goals as of 20:58, 16 June 2022 (UTC)

Ramiro Gabriel Sordo (born 29 June 2000) is an Argentine professional footballer who plays as a winger for Liga MX club Santos Laguna.

== Career ==
Sordo started his youth career with amateur club Belgrano (Las Rosas), prior to moving to the academy of Newell's Old Boys in 2012. After eight years progressing through their ranks, the winger made his breakthrough into their first-team in mid-2020 under manager Frank Darío Kudelka. He was initially an unused substitute for a Copa de la Liga Profesional defeat away to Talleres on 30 October, before making his senior debut in the same competition on 9 November in a home loss to Boca Juniors.

== Career statistics ==
As of 9 November 2020.

Appearances and goals by club, season and competition
Club	Season	League			Cup		League Cup		Continental		Other		Total	
Club	Season	Division	Apps	Goals	Apps	Goals	Apps	Goals	Apps	Goals	Apps	Goals	Apps	Goals
Newell's Old Boys	2020–21 (Note: Soccerway counts Copa de la Liga Profesional appearances as league appearances.)	Primera División	1	0	0	0	0	0	—		0	0	1	0
Career total			1	0	0	0	0	0	—		0	0	1	0
