= Clausura 2026 Liga MX final phase =

Tournament details
- Dates: 2 May 2026 – 24 May 2026
- Teams: 8

Tournament statistics
- Matches played: 14
- Goals scored: 39 (2.79 per match)

The Clausura 2026 Liga MX final phase was played between 2 May and 24 May 2026. A total of eight teams competed in the final phase to decide the champions of the Clausura 2026 season.

For the first time since the Apertura 2019 season, there was no previous phase before the quarter-finals, decreasing the participants from ten to eight.

Cruz Azul defeated Pumas UNAM 2–1 on aggregate to capture their tenth title. As winners, Cruz Azul earned the right to face the Apertura 2025 champion, Toluca, in the 2026 Campeón de Campeones.

== Qualified teams ==
The following teams qualified for the championship stage.

In the following tables, the number of appearances, last appearance, and previous best result count only those in the short tournament era starting from Invierno 1996 (not counting those in the long tournament era from 1943–44 to 1995–96).

Qualified directly to quarter-finals (8 teams)
Seed	Team	Points (GD)	Date of qualification	Appearance	Last appearance	Previous best (last)	Ref.
1	Pumas UNAM	36	12 April 2026	30th	Apertura 2025	Champions (Cl. 2011)	
2	Guadalajara	36	4 April 2026	35th	Apertura 2025	Champions (Cl. 2017)	
3	Cruz Azul	33	12 April 2026	39th	Apertura 2025	Champions (Gua. 2021)	
4	Pachuca	31	12 April 2026	43rd	Apertura 2025	Champions (Ap. 2022)	
5	Toluca	30	12 April 2026	41st	Apertura 2025	Champions (Ap. 2025)	
6	Atlas	26	25 April 2026	27th	Apertura 2024	Champions (Cl. 2022)	
7	Tigres UANL	25	25 April 2026	37th	Apertura 2025	Champions (Cl. 2023)	
8	América	25	25 April 2026	42nd	Apertura 2025	Champions (Ap. 2024)	

== Bracket ==
Quarter-finals
1	Pumas UNAM (s)	3	3	6
8	América	3	3	6
4	Pachuca	1	2	3
5	Toluca	0	0	0
2	Guadalajara (s)	1	2	3
7	Tigres UANL	3	0	3
3	Cruz Azul	3	1	4
6	Atlas	2	0	2

Semi-finals
1	Pumas UNAM (s)	0	1	1
4	Pachuca	1	0	1
2	Guadalajara	2	1	3
3	Cruz Azul	2	2	4

Finals
1	Pumas UNAM	0	1	1
3	Cruz Azul	0	2	2

== Quarter-finals ==
=== Summary ===
The first legs were played on 2 and 3 May, and the second legs were played on 9 and 10 May 2026.

Team 1	Agg.	Team 2	1st leg	2nd leg
América	6–6 (s)	Pumas UNAM	3–3	3–3
Tigres UANL	3–3 (s)	Guadalajara	3–1	0–2
Atlas	2–4	Cruz Azul	2–3	0–1
Toluca	0–3	Pachuca	0–1	0–2

=== Matches ===
3 May 2026
17:00 CST (UTC−6)

América	3–3	Pumas UNAM
Violante 13'; Martín 78' (pen.); Zendejas 85' (pen.)	Report	Juninho 5'; Antuna 44'; Carrillo 52'

Estadio Banorte, Mexico City
Referee: Luis Enrique Santander (Guanajuato)
10 May 2026
19:15 CST (UTC−6)

Pumas UNAM	3–3	América
Duarte 3'; Nathan 13'; Carrillo 23'	Report	Salas 30'; Zendejas 40' (pen.), 61'

Estadio Olímpico Universitario, Mexico City
Referee: César Ramos (Sinaloa)

6–6 on aggregate. Pumas UNAM advanced due to being the higher seeded club.

2 May 2026
19:00 CST (UTC−6)

Tigres UANL	3–1	Guadalajara
Angulo 45'; Brunetta 53'; Sánchez 55'	Report	Marín 11'

Estadio Universitario, San Nicolás de los Garza
Referee: Vicente Reynoso (Nayarit)
9 May 2026
19:07 CST (UTC−6)

Guadalajara	2–0	Tigres UANL
Sandoval 74', 77'	Report

Estadio Akron, Zapopan
Attendance: 40,668
Referee: Marco Ortíz (Durango)

3–3 on aggregate. Guadalajara advanced due to being the higher seeded club.

2 May 2026
21:15 CST (UTC−6)

Atlas	2–3	Cruz Azul
A. González 69'; Rocha 81' (pen.)	Report	Rotondi 45+3'; Ebere 55', 87' (pen.)

Estadio Jalisco, Guadalajara
Referee: Yonatan Peinado (Chihuahua)
9 May 2026
21:15 CST (UTC−6)

Cruz Azul	1–0	Atlas
Paradela 32'	Report

Estadio Banorte, Mexico City
Referee: Katia Itzel García (Mexico City)

Cruz Azul won 4–2 on aggregate.

3 May 2026
19:15 CST (UTC−6)

Toluca	0–1	Pachuca
	Report	Valencia 6'

Estadio Nemesio Díez, Toluca
Referee: Fernando Hernández (Mexico City)
10 May 2026
17:00 CST (UTC−6)

Pachuca	2–0	Toluca
Valencia 10' (pen.); Kenedy 54'	Report

Estadio Hidalgo, Pachuca
Referee: Adonai Escobedo (Aguascalientes)

Pachuca won 3–0 on aggregate.

== Semi-finals ==
=== Summary ===
The first legs were played on 13 and 14 May, and the second legs were played on 16 and 17 May 2026.

Team 1	Agg.	Team 2	1st leg	2nd leg
Pachuca	1–1 (s)	Pumas UNAM	1–0	0–1
Cruz Azul	4–3	Guadalajara	2–2	2–1

=== Matches ===
14 May 2026
19:00 CST (UTC−6)

Pachuca	1–0	Pumas UNAM
Idrissi 38'	Report

Estadio Hidalgo, Pachuca
Referee: Ismael López Peñuelas (Jalisco)
17 May 2026
19:00 CST (UTC−6)

Pumas UNAM	1–0	Pachuca
Carrillo 56'	Report

Estadio Olímpico Universitario, Mexico City
Attendance: 46,106
Referee: Daniel Quintero (Jalisco)

1–1 on aggregate. Pumas UNAM advanced due to being the higher seeded club.

13 May 2026
20:00 CST (UTC−6)

Cruz Azul	2–2	Guadalajara
Rodríguez 37'; Ebere 56' (pen.)	Report	Sandoval 29'; Á. Sepúlveda 50'

Estadio Banorte, Mexico City
Referee: Maximiliano Quintero Hernández (Veracruz)
16 May 2026
19:07 CST (UTC−6)

Guadalajara	1–2	Cruz Azul
Govea 8'	Report	Márquez 5'; Palavecino 66'

Estadio Jalisco, Guadalajara
Referee: César Ramos (Sinaloa)

Cruz Azul won 4–3 on aggregate.

== Finals ==
=== Summary ===
The first leg was played on 21 May, and the second leg was played on 24 May 2026.

Team 1	Agg.	Team 2	1st leg	2nd leg
Cruz Azul	2–1	Pumas UNAM	0–0	2–1

=== First leg ===
21 May 2026
20:00 CST (UTC−6)

Cruz Azul	0–0	Pumas UNAM
	Report

Estadio Ciudad de los Deportes, Mexico City
Referee: Ismael López Peñuelas (Jalisco)

==== Details ====
Cruz Azul	Pumas UNAM

GK	23	(Colombia) Kevin Mier
DF	16	(Mexico) Jeremy Márquez	(yellow card) 42'
DF	4	(Colombia) Willer Ditta
DF	33	(Argentina) Gonzalo Piovi
DF	3	(Mexico) Omar Campos		(substituted off) 81'
MF	8	(Argentina) Agustín Palavecino
MF	17	(Mexico) Amaury García	(yellow card) 49'
MF	20	(Argentina) José Paradela		(substituted off) 81'
MF	19	(Mexico) Carlos Rodríguez (c)		(substituted off) 89'
MF	29	(Argentina) Carlos Rotondi
FW	11	(Nigeria) Christian Ebere		(substituted off) 64'
Substitutions:
GK	1	(Mexico) Andrés Gudiño
DF	5	(Mexico) Jesús Orozco
DF	22	(Mexico) Jorge Rodarte
MF	10	(Mexico) Andrés Montaño		(substituted on) 89'
MF	18	(Argentina) Luka Romero		(substituted on) 81'
MF	170	(Mexico) Ariel Castro
MF	193	(Mexico) Jaziel Mendoza
FW	194	(Mexico) Amaury Morales		(substituted on) 81'
FW	21	(Uruguay) Gabriel Fernández		(substituted on) 64'
FW	214	(Mexico) Mateo Levy
Manager:
(Mexico) Joel Huiqui

GK	1	(Costa Rica) Keylor Navas (c)
DF	7	(Mexico) Rodrigo López
DF	6	(Brazil) Nathan
DF	5	(Spain) Rubén Duarte
MF	21	(Mexico) Uriel Antuna		(substituted off) 84'
MF	20	(Mexico) Santiago Trigos
MF	45	(Ecuador) Pedro Vite	(yellow card) 70'
MF	33	(Mexico) Jordán Carrillo
MF	77	(Colombia) Álvaro Angulo	(yellow card) 56'
FW	31	(Paraguay) Robert Morales
FW	23	(Brazil) Juninho		(substituted off) 57'
Substitutions:
GK	35	(Mexico) Pablo Lara
DF	2	(Mexico) Pablo Bennevendo		(substituted on) 84'
DF	19	(Mexico) Jesús Rivas
DF	24	(Mexico) Tony Leone
DF	215	(Mexico) Ángel Azuaje
MF	14	(Mexico) César Garza
MF	15	(Mexico) Ulises Rivas
MF	26	(Mexico) Ángel Rico
MF	28	(Panama) Adalberto Carrasquilla		(substituted on) 57'
MF	193	(Mexico) Dennis Ramírez
Manager:
(Mexico) Efraín Juárez

Assistant referees:
Enríque Isaac Bustos (Guerrero)
Christian Kiabek Espinosa (Mexico City)
Fourth official:
Yonatan Peinado Aguirre (Chihuahua)
Reserve assistant referee:
Edgar Magdaleno Castrejon (Chihuahua)
Video assistant referee:
Diana Stephanía Pérez (Guanajuato)
Assistant video assistant referee:
Salvador Pérez Villalobos (Mexico City)

==== Statistics ====
Statistic	Cruz Azul	Pumas UNAM
Goals scored	0	0
Total shots	24	4
Shots on target	4	1
Saves	1	4
Ball possession	61%	39%
Corner kicks	7	1
Fouls committed	11	7
Offsides	2	0
Yellow cards	2	2
Red cards	0	0

=== Second leg ===
24 May 2026
19:00 CST (UTC−6)

Pumas UNAM	1–2	Cruz Azul
Morales 31'	Report	Duarte 54' (o.g.); Rotondi 90+5'

Estadio Olímpico Universitario, Mexico City
Referee: Daniel Quintero (Jalisco)

Cruz Azul won 2–1 on aggregate.

==== Details ====
Pumas UNAM	Cruz Azul

GK	1	(Costa Rica) Keylor Navas (c)
DF	7	(Mexico) Rodrigo López	(yellow card) 45'	(substituted off) 85'
DF	6	(Brazil) Nathan
DF	5	(Spain) Rubén Duarte		(substituted off) 72'
MF	21	(Mexico) Uriel Antuna	(red card) 90+3'
MF	28	(Panama) Adalberto Carrasquilla		(substituted off) 59'
MF	45	(Ecuador) Pedro Vite
MF	33	(Mexico) Jordán Carrillo
MF	77	(Colombia) Álvaro Angulo
FW	31	(Paraguay) Robert Morales
FW	23	(Brazil) Juninho
Substitutions:
GK	35	(Mexico) Pablo Lara
DF	2	(Mexico) Pablo Bennevendo		(substituted on) 72'
DF	19	(Mexico) Jesús Rivas
DF	24	(Mexico) Tony Leone
DF	215	(Mexico) Ángel Azuaje
MF	14	(Mexico) César Garza
MF	15	(Mexico) Ulises Rivas
MF	20	(Mexico) Santiago Trigos		(substituted on) 59'
MF	26	(Mexico) Ángel Rico	(red card) 90+8'	(substituted on) 85'
MF	193	(Mexico) Dennis Ramírez
Manager:
(Mexico) Efraín Juárez

GK	23	(Colombia) Kevin Mier
DF	16	(Mexico) Jeremy Márquez
DF	4	(Colombia) Willer Ditta
DF	33	(Argentina) Gonzalo Piovi
DF	3	(Mexico) Omar Campos
MF	8	(Argentina) Agustín Palavecino
MF	17	(Mexico) Amaury García	(substituted off) 79'
MF	20	(Argentina) José Paradela	(substituted off) 36'
MF	19	(Mexico) Carlos Rodríguez (c)
MF	29	(Argentina) Carlos Rotondi
FW	11	(Nigeria) Christian Ebere
Substitutions:
GK	1	(Mexico) Andrés Gudiño
DF	5	(Mexico) Jesús Orozco
DF	22	(Mexico) Jorge Rodarte	(substituted on) 79'
MF	10	(Mexico) Andrés Montaño
MF	18	(Argentina) Luka Romero
MF	32	(Mexico) Cristian Jiménez
MF	170	(Mexico) Ariel Castro
MF	194	(Mexico) Amaury Morales
FW	7	(Argentina) Nicolás Ibáñez
FW	21	(Uruguay) Gabriel Fernández	(substituted on) 36'
Manager:
(Mexico) Joel Huiqui

Assistant referees:
Michel Ricardo Espinoza (Mexico City)
Michel Alejandro Morales (Mexico City)
Fourth official:
Vicente Jassiel Reynoso (Nayarit)
Reserve assistant referee:
Karen Janett Díaz (Aguascalientes)
Video assistant referee:
Guillermo Pacheco Larios (Sonora)
Assistant video assistant referee:
Michel Caballero Galicia (Morelos)

==== Statistics ====
Statistic	Pumas UNAM	Cruz Azul
Goals scored	1	2
Total shots	12	18
Shots on target	3	6
Saves	5	2
Ball possession	47%	53%
Corner kicks	7	7
Fouls committed	14	5
Offsides	0	2
Yellow cards	1	0
Red cards	2	0

== Statistics ==
=== Goalscorers ===
There were 39 goals scored in 14 matches, for an average of 2.79 goals per match.

3 goals

- (Mexico) Jordán Carrillo (Pumas UNAM)
- (Nigeria) Christian Ebere (Cruz Azul)
- (Mexico) Santiago Sandoval (Guadalajara)
- (United States) Alejandro Zendejas (América)

2 goals

- (Argentina) Carlos Rotondi (Cruz Azul)
- (Ecuador) Enner Valencia (Pachuca)

1 goal

- (Mexico) Jesús Angulo (Tigres UANL)
- (Mexico) Uriel Antuna (Pumas UNAM)
- (Argentina) Juan Brunetta (Tigres UANL)
- (Brazil) Juninho (Pumas UNAM)
- (Spain) Rubén Duarte (Pumas UNAM)
- (Mexico) Alfonso González (Atlas)
- (Mexico) Omar Govea (Guadalajara)
- (Morocco) Oussama Idrissi (Pachuca)
- (Mexico) Ricardo Marín (Guadalajara)
- (Mexico) Jeremy Márquez (Cruz Azul)
- (Mexico) Henry Martín (América)
- (Paraguay) Robert Morales (Pumas UNAM)
- (Brazil) Kenedy (Pachuca)
- (Argentina) José Paradela (Cruz Azul)
- (Argentina) Agustín Palavecino (Cruz Azul)
- (Mexico) Aldo Rocha (Atlas)
- (Mexico) Carlos Rodríguez (Cruz Azul)
- (Argentina) Carlos Rotondi (Cruz Azul)
- (Mexico) Patricio Salas (América)
- (Mexico) Diego Sánchez (Tigres UANL)
- (Mexico) Ángel Sepúlveda (Guadalajara)
- (Brazil) Nathan Silva (Pumas UNAM)
- (Mexico) Isaías Violante (América)

1 own goal

- (Spain) Rubén Duarte (for Cruz Azul)

=== Assists ===
2 assists

- (Argentina) José Paradela (Cruz Azul)

1 assist

- (Argentina) Juan Brunetta (Tigres UANL)
- (Panama) Adalberto Carrasquilla (Pumas UNAM)
- (Mexico) Jordán Carrillo (Pumas UNAM)
- (Brazil) Juninho (Pumas UNAM)
- (Mexico) Luis Gamboa (Atlas)
- (Mexico) Alexéi Domínguez (Pachuca)
- (Mexico) Omar Govea (Guadalajara)
- (Mexico) Víctor Guzmán (Pachuca)
- (Mexico) Elías Montiel (Pachuca)
- (Uruguay) Brian Rodríguez (América)
- (Mexico) Carlos Rodríguez (Cruz Azul)
- (Mexico) Patricio Salas (América)
- (Ecuador) Pedro Vite (Pumas UNAM)
- (United States) Alejandro Zendejas (América)
