= 2023–24 Pumas UNAM season =

UNAM
2023–24 season
- President: Leopoldo Silva Gutiérrez
- Manager: Antonio Mohamed
- Stadium: Estadio Olímpico Universitario
- Apertura 2023: Preseaon
- Leagues Cup: Round of 32
Home colours	Away colours

The 2023–24 season was Pumas UNAM's 70th season in the top flight of Mexican football. In addition to the domestic league, UNAM will be participating in this season's editions of the Leagues Cup.

== Players ==
As of 16 September 2026

Note: Flags indicate national team as defined under FIFA eligibility rules; some limited exceptions apply. Players may hold more than one non-FIFA nationality.

No.	Pos.	Nation	Player
1	GK	CRC	Keylor Navas
2	DF	MEX	Pablo Bennevendo
5	DF	ESP	Rubén Duarte
6	DF	BRA	Nathan
7	MF	MEX	Rodrigo López
8	MF	PAN	Adalberto Carrasquilla
10	FW	MEX	César Huerta
11	FW	MEX	José Juan Macías
12	DF	MEX	Cristian Calderón
13	DF	MEX	Pablo Monroy
14	MF	ARG	Luciano Herrera (on loan from Newell's Old Boys)
15	MF	MEX	Israel Luna
17	MF	MEX	Sebastián Córdova
18	MF	MEX	Víctor Arteaga

No.	Pos.	Nation	Player
19	DF	MEX	Jesús Rivas
20	MF	MEX	Santiago Trigos
21	MF	MEX	Uriel Antuna
22	MF	MEX	Alan Medina
23	FW	BRA	Juninho
24	DF	MEX	Tony Leone (on loan from Monterrey)
26	MF	MEX	Ángel Rico
30	FW	CAN	Santiago López
31	FW	PAR	Robert Morales (on loan from Toluca)
32	GK	MEX	Miguel Paul
34	DF	VEN	Ángel Azuaje
35	GK	MEX	Pablo Lara
45	MF	ECU	Pedro Vite
77	DF	COL	Álvaro Angulo

== Transfers ==
=== Out ===
Date	Pos.	Player	To	Type	Ref.
May 2023	FW	(Brazil) Diogo	(Uruguay) Plaza Colonia	End of loan	

== Competitions ==
=== Overview ===
Competition	Record							
Competition	Pld	W	D	L	GF	GA	GD	Win %
Apertura	21	9	5	7	31	21	+10	42.86
Clausura	0	0	0	0	0	0	+0	—
Leagues Cup	3	1	1	1	5	3	+2	33.33
Total	24	10	6	8	36	24	+12	41.67

Last updated: 10 December 2023
Source: Competitions

=== Apertura 2023 ===
==== League table ====
Pos	Team	Pld	W	D	L	GF	GA	GD	Pts	Qualification
2	Monterrey	17	10	3	4	27	15	+12	33	Qualification for the quarter-finals (Note: The first four places in the table will qualify for the Liguilla quarter-finals and host the second leg.)
3	Tigres	17	8	6	3	32	18	+14	30	Qualification for the quarter-finals
4	Pumas	17	8	4	5	27	18	+9	28	Qualification for the quarter-finals
5	Guadalajara	17	8	3	6	22	22	0	27	Qualification for the quarter-finals
6	Puebla	17	7	4	6	24	25	−1	25 (Note: Puebla was penalized for having unregistered assistant coach Luis Miguel Noriega on the bench in their Week 7 match against Tijuana. Puebla originally won the match 3–0 and was awarded to Tijuana as a 1–0 victory. The Court of Arbitration for Sport later reversed the ruling.)	Qualification for the quarter-finals

Source: Liga MX
Rules for classification: 1) Points; 2) Goal difference; 3) Number of goals scored; 4) Head-to-head results between tied teams; 5) Number of goals scored away; 6) Highest relegation coefficient; 7) Fair Play points

==== Results summary ====
Overall								Home						Away					
Pld	W	D	L	GF	GA	GD	Pts	W	D	L	GF	GA	GD	W	D	L	GF	GA	GD
12	6	3	3	22	15	+7	21	3	2	0	10	4	+6	3	1	3	12	11	+1

Source: Liga MX

==== Results by round ====
Round	1	2	3	4	5	6	7	8	9	10	11	12	13	14	15	16	17
Ground	A	H	A	H	A	H	A	H	A	A	H	A	H	A	A	H	H
Result	W	D	D	D	L	W	L	W	W	L	W	W					
Position	3	3	4	7	8	7	10	9	6	6	4	3					

Updated to match(es) played on 30 September 2023. Source: Liga MX
A = Away; H = Home; W = Win; D = Draw; L = Loss

==== Matches ====
The league fixtures were released on 7 June 2023.

30 June 2023 1	Tijuana	2−3	UNAM	Tijuana
21:10 UTC−6	Madrigal 45+3'; González 47'; Fernández (yellow card) 87'	Report	Rivas 25'; Nathan (yellow card) 26'; Ortiz (yellow card) 39'; Mohamed (DT) (yellow card) 45+5'; Dinenno 69' (pen.); Caicedo (yellow card) 81'; Salvio 89'	Stadium: Estadio Caliente; Attendance: 26,333; Referee: Daniel Quintero Huitrón

9 July 2023 2	UNAM	0–0	Mazatlán	Mexico City
12:00 UTC−6	Del Prete (yellow card) 40'; Huerta (yellow card) 88'	Report	Díaz (yellow card) 54' (yellow-red card) 85'; Colula (yellow card) 88'; González (yellow card) 90+4'	Stadium: Estadio Olímpico Universitario; Attendance: 20,844; Referee: Oscar Macías Romo

16 July 2023 3	Pachuca	1−1	UNAM	Pachuca
20:15 UTC−6	Barreto (yellow card) 13'; Almada (DT) (yellow card) 31'; Nathan 44' (o.g.); de la Fuente (yellow card) 85'; Terans (yellow card) 89'	Report	Caicedo (yellow card) 5'; Huerta (yellow card) 33'; Del Prete 20'; Bennevendo (yellow card) 54'; Nathan (yellow card) 65'; Ergas (yellow card) 87'; Aldrete (yellow card) 88'; Trigos (yellow card) 90'	Stadium: Estadio Hidalgo; Attendance: 9,396; Referee: Oscar Mejía García

18 August 2023 4	UNAM	1−1	Toluca	Mexico City
				Stadium: Estadio Olímpico Universitario

22 August 2023 5	Juárez	4−1	UNAM	Ciudad Juárez
				Stadium: Estadio Olímpico Benito Juárez

27 August 2023 6	UNAM	2−1	UANL	Mexico City
				Stadium: Estadio Olímpico Universitario

2 September 2023 7	Santos Laguna	2−1	UNAM	Torreón
				Stadium: Estadio Corona

17 September 2023 8	UNAM	3−2	Atlético San Luis	Mexico City
				Attendance: Estadio Olímpico Universitario

22 September 2023 9	Puebla	2−0	UNAM	Puebla
				Stadium: Estadio Cuauhtémoc

30 September 2023 10	América	1−0	UNAM	Mexico City
				Attendance: Estadio Azteca

4 October 2023 11	UNAM	4−0	Querétaro	Mexico City
				Stadium: Estadio Olímpico Universitario

7 October 2023 12	Cruz Azul	1−4	UNAM	Mexico City
				Attendance: Estadio Azteca

22 October 2023 13	UNAM	v	Monterrey	Mexico City
				Stadium: Estadio Olímpico Universitario

27 October 2023 14	Necaxa	v	UNAM	Aguascalientes
				Stadium: Estadio Victoria

31 October 2023 15	León	v	UNAM	León
				Stadium: Estadio León

4 November 2023 16	UNAM	v	Atlas	Mexico City
				Stadium: Estadio Olímpico Universitario

11 November 2023 17	UNAM	v	Guadalajara	Mexico City
				Stadium: Estadio Olímpico Universitario

=== Leagues Cup ===
==== Group stage ====
The group stage was announced on 20 January 2023.

Pos	Team	Pld	W	PW	PL	L	GF	GA	GD	Pts	Qualification	UNM	DCU	MTL
1	(Mexico) Pumas UNAM	2	1	0	1	0	5	2	+3	4	Advance to knockout stage	—	3–0	—
2	(United States) D.C. United	2	1	0	0	1	1	3	−2	3	Advance to knockout stage	—	—	—
3	(Canada) CF Montréal	2	0	1	0	1	2	3	−1	2		2–2	0–1	—

Source: Leagues Cup
Rules for classification: Tiebreakers

22 July 2023 1	CF Montréal (Canada)	2–2 (4–2 p)	(Mexico) UNAM	Montreal, Canada
17:30 UTC−6	Duke 23'; Choinière 43', (yellow card) 59'; Saliba (yellow card) 51'; Sirois (yellow card) 76'	Report	Huerta (yellow card) 76'; Fernández 88'; Montejano 90+1'; Ruvalcaba (yellow card) 90+2'	Stadium: Saputo Stadium; Attendance: 19,619; Referee: Keylor Herrera Villalobos
	Penalties
	Camacho (penalty scored); Choinière (penalty scored); Corbo (penalty scored); Lappalainen (penalty scored)		(penalty missed) Aldrete; (penalty scored) Fernández; (penalty scored) Huerta; (penalty missed) Ruvalcaba

29 July 2023 2	UNAM (Mexico)	3–0	(United States) D.C. United	Washington, D.C., United States
18:30 UTC−6	Huerta 6'; Silva 42'; Fernández 52'	Report	Dájome (yellow card) 56'; Asad (yellow card) 83'	Stadium: Audi Field; Attendance: 14,599; Referee: Oshane Nation

==== Knockout stage ====
3 August 2023 Round of 32	UNAM (Mexico)	0–1	(Mexico) Querétaro	Washington D.C., United States
18:00 UTC−6	Aldrete (yellow card) 73'; Huerta (yellow card) 86'; Caicedo (yellow card) 90+4'	Report	Perlaza (yellow card) 45+1'; Sepúlveda 74'; Lértora (yellow card) 77'; Montecinos (yellow card) 90+1'	Stadium: Audi Field; Attendance: 948; Referee: Guido Gonzales Jr.

=== Clausura 2024 ===
==== League table ====
Pos	Team	Pld	W	D	L	GF	GA	GD	Pts	Qualification
6	Guadalajara	17	9	4	4	24	17	+7	31	Qualification for the quarter-finals (Note: The first four places in the table will qualify for the Liguilla quarter-finals and host the second leg. The fifth and sixth placed teams will host the first leg.)
7	Pachuca	17	9	2	6	34	27	+7	29	Qualification for the play-in round (Note: Teams ranked 7th to 10th will qualify for the play-in round.)
8	Pumas	17	7	6	4	27	22	+5	27	Qualification for the play-in round
9	Necaxa	17	7	6	4	30	29	+1	27	Qualification for the play-in round
10	Querétaro	17	6	6	5	22	21	+1	24	Qualification for the play-in round

Source: Liga MX
Rules for classification: 1) Points; 2) Goal difference; 3) Number of goals scored; 4) Head-to-head results between tied teams; 5) Number of goals scored away; 6) Highest relegation coefficient; 7) Fair Play points

== Statistics ==
=== Goals ===
Rank	Player	Apertura	Clausura	Leagues Cup	Total
1	(Mexico) César Huerta	9	0	1	10
2	(Uruguay) Gabriel Fernández	7	0	2	9
3	(Argentina) Juan Dinenno	6	0	0	6
4	(Brazil) Nathan	2	0	1	3
5	(Mexico) Ulises Rivas	2	0	0	2
5	(Argentina) Gustavo Del Prete	2	0	0	2
6	(Argentina) Eduardo Salvio	1	0	0	1
6	(Mexico) Emanuel Montejano	0	0	1	1
Own goals		0	0	0	0
Total		21	0	5	26

=== Clean sheets ===
Rank	Player	Apertura 2023	Clausura 2024	Leagues Cup	Total
1	(Mexico) Julio González	3	0	0	3
2	(Mexico) Gil Alcalá	0	0	1	1
Total		3	0	1	4
