= 2024–25 Pumas UNAM season =

Pumas UNAM
2024–25 season
- President: Luis Raúl González Pérez
- Manager: Gustavo Lema
- Stadium: Estadio Olímpico Universitario
- Liga MX: TBD
- CONCACAF Champions Cup: Quarter-finals
- Leagues Cup: Round of 16
- Average home league attendance: 19,029 (A) 21,173 (C)

The 2024–25 season was the seventy-first season for Pumas UNAM in the Primera División, the top flight of professional club football in Mexico. The team was under the management of Gustavo Lema in his first full season as manager of UNAM.

== Players ==
As of 16 September 2026

Note: Flags indicate national team as defined under FIFA eligibility rules; some limited exceptions apply. Players may hold more than one non-FIFA nationality.

No.	Pos.	Nation	Player
1	GK	CRC	Keylor Navas
2	DF	MEX	Pablo Bennevendo
5	DF	ESP	Rubén Duarte
6	DF	BRA	Nathan
7	MF	MEX	Rodrigo López
8	MF	PAN	Adalberto Carrasquilla
10	FW	MEX	César Huerta
11	FW	MEX	José Juan Macías
12	DF	MEX	Cristian Calderón
13	DF	MEX	Pablo Monroy
14	MF	ARG	Luciano Herrera (on loan from Newell's Old Boys)
15	MF	MEX	Israel Luna
17	MF	MEX	Sebastián Córdova
18	MF	MEX	Víctor Arteaga

No.	Pos.	Nation	Player
19	DF	MEX	Jesús Rivas
20	MF	MEX	Santiago Trigos
21	MF	MEX	Uriel Antuna
22	MF	MEX	Alan Medina
23	FW	BRA	Juninho
24	DF	MEX	Tony Leone (on loan from Monterrey)
26	MF	MEX	Ángel Rico
30	FW	CAN	Santiago López
31	FW	PAR	Robert Morales (on loan from Toluca)
32	GK	MEX	Miguel Paul
34	DF	VEN	Ángel Azuaje
35	GK	MEX	Pablo Lara
45	MF	ECU	Pedro Vite
77	DF	COL	Álvaro Angulo

== Competitions ==
In addition to league play, UNAM will also participate in several cup competitions. In July and August, Liga MX play will halt for the Leagues Cup, an continental competition with Major League Soccer clubs hosted in Canada and the United States.

=== Apertura 2024 ===
==== League table ====
Pos	Team	Pld	W	D	L	GF	GA	GD	Pts	Qualification
2	Toluca	17	10	5	2	38	16	+22	35	Qualification for the quarter–finals (Note: The first six places in the table qualifed for the Liguilla quarter-finals.)
3	Tigres UANL	17	10	4	3	25	15	+10	34	Qualification for the quarter–finals
4	Pumas UNAM	17	9	4	4	21	13	+8	31	Qualification for the quarter–finals
5	Monterrey	17	9	4	4	26	19	+7	31	Qualification for the quarter–finals
6	Atlético San Luis	17	9	3	5	27	19	+8	30	Qualification for the quarter–finals

Source: Liga MX
Rules for classification: 1) Points; 2) Goal difference; 3) Number of goals scored; 4) Head-to-head results between tied teams; 5) Number of goals scored away; 6) Highest relegation coefficient; 7) Fair Play points

==== Results summary ====
Overall								Home						Away					
Pld	W	D	L	GF	GA	GD	Pts	W	D	L	GF	GA	GD	W	D	L	GF	GA	GD
2	1	1	0	5	2	+3	4	1	0	0	4	1	+3	0	1	0	1	1	0

Last updated: 7 July 2024.
Source: Liga MX

=== Leagues Cup ===
==== Group stage ====
West 1

Pos	Team	Pld	W	PW	PL	L	GF	GA	GD	Pts	Qualification	AUS	UNM	MTY
1	(United States Soccer Federation) Austin FC	2	2	0	0	0	5	2	+3	6	Advance to knockout stage	—	—	—
2	(Mexican Football Federation) UNAM	2	0	1	0	1	3	4	−1	2	Advance to knockout stage	2–3	—	—
3	(Mexican Football Federation) Monterrey	2	0	0	1	1	1	3	−2	1		0–2	1–1	—

Source: Leagues Cup
Rules for classification: Tiebreakers

26 July 2024 1	UNAM (Mexico)	2–3	(United States) Austin FC	Austin, United States
19:00 UTC−6	Ávila 45+5'; Ruvalcaba (yellow card) 47'; Huerta (yellow card) 48'; Martínez 72'	Report	Ring 8'; Bukari (yellow card) 28' (yellow-red card) 34'; Biro (yellow card) 44'; Zardes 45'; Driussi 55'; Wolff (yellow card) 71'; Cleveland (yellow card) 77'	Stadium: Q2 Stadium; Referee: Julio Luna

2 August 2024 2	Monterrey (Mexico)	1–1 (0–3 p)	(Mexico) UNAM	Austin, United States
20:00 UTC−6	Meza (yellow card) 32'; Corona 53'; Vázquez (yellow card) 77'	Report	Mori 80'; Magallán (yellow card) 83'	Stadium: Q2 Stadium; Referee: Walter López
	Penalties
	Vázquez (penalty missed); Medina (penalty missed); Rojas (penalty missed)		(penalty missed) Quispe; (penalty scored) Huerta; (penalty scored) Nathan Silva; (penalty scored) Ergas

=== Knockout stage ===
7 August Round of 32	Vancouver Whitecaps FC	0–2	(Mexico) UNAM	Vancouver, Canada
				Stadium: BC Place

12 August Round of 16	Seattle Sounders FC (United States)	4–0	(Mexico) UNAM	Seattle, United States
		Report		Stadium: Lumen Field
