= List of Mexican football transfers summer 2026 =

== América ==
In: Note: Flags indicate national team as defined under FIFA eligibility rules; some limited exceptions apply. Players may hold more than one non-FIFA nationality.

No.	Pos.	Nation	Player
2	DF	MEX	Emilio Lara (loan return from Necaxa)
6	MF	USA	Edwin Cerrillo (from (United States) LA Galaxy)
8	MF	ESP	Carlos Álvarez (from (Spain) Levante)
14	DF	URU	Santiago Bueno (on loan from (England) Wolverhampton Wanderers)
15	DF	ARG	Santiago Ramos Mingo (from (Brazil) Bahia)
22	MF	COL	Óscar Perea (from (France) Strasbourg)
24	DF	MEX	Franco Rossano (loan return from Necaxa)
30	GK	MEX	Rodolfo Cota (from León)
93	FW	COL	Miguel Borja (from (United Arab Emirates) Al Wasl)

Out: Note: Flags indicate national team as defined under FIFA eligibility rules; some limited exceptions apply. Players may hold more than one non-FIFA nationality.

No.	Pos.	Nation	Player
4	DF	URU	Sebastián Cáceres (to (Spain) Celta de Vigo)
6	MF	MEX	Jonathan dos Santos (Unattached)
14	DF	MEX	Néstor Araujo (to (Portugal) Chaves)
15	DF	USA	Ralph Orquin (to Cruz Azul)
17	MF	BRA	Rodrigo Dourado (on loan to Juárez)
33	FW	MEX	Patricio Salas (on loan to (Portugal) Famalicão)
35	MF	MEX	Santiago Naveda (to Venados)
37	FW	MEX	Esteban Lozano (on loan to Santos Laguna, previously on loan at Puebla)
45	MF	BRA	Lima (loan return to (Brazil) Fluminense, later loaned to (Brazil) Santos)
182	DF	USA	Walter Portales (to Atlante)
—	DF	MEX	Cristian Calderón (to Pumas UNAM, previously on loan at Necaxa)

== Atlante ==
In: Note: Flags indicate national team as defined under FIFA eligibility rules; some limited exceptions apply. Players may hold more than one non-FIFA nationality.

No.	Pos.	Nation	Player
1	GK	MEX	Óscar Jiménez (from León)
3	DF	MEX	Gustavo Sánchez (from Monterrey)
4	DF	MEX	Eduardo Tercero (Free agent, last with Tigres UANL)
7	MF	ECU	Jhojan Julio (from Querétaro)
10	MF	MEX	Octavio Vázquez (from Sinaloa)
11	FW	MEX	Joaquín Moxica (on loan from Monterrey)
14	DF	MEX	Cristóbal Alfaro (from Pachuca U21)
20	MF	MEX	Gilberto Adame (from Mazatlán)
24	DF	MEX	Ari Contreras (from Pachuca U21)
25	MF	URU	Martín Fernández (from (Argentina) Newell's Old Boys)
26	GK	COL	David Ospina (Free agent, last with (Colombia) Atlético Nacional)
29	DF	USA	Walter Portales (from América)
30	MF	ARG	Martín Sarrafiore (from (Chile) O'Higgins)
32	DF	ECU	Diogo Bagüí (on loan from Tijuana)
33	GK	COL	Jordan García (on loan from León)
37	DF	PAR	Walter Clar (from (Brazil) Chapecoense)
44	DF	ARG	Aarón Quirós (on loan from Vélez Sarsfield)
—	MF	USA	Alejandro Urzua (Free agent, last with (United States) FC Dallas)

Out: Note: Flags indicate national team as defined under FIFA eligibility rules; some limited exceptions apply. Players may hold more than one non-FIFA nationality.

No.	Pos.	Nation	Player
3	DF	MEX	Diego Cruz (to Piratas)
4	DF	MEX	Luis Olivas (to (Costa Rica) Cartaginés)
7	MF	MEX	Marco García (to Atlético La Paz)
8	MF	MEX	Ronaldo González (to Jaiba Brava)
10	FW	MEX	Johan Alonzo (to Atlético La Paz)
11	FW	MEX	Illian Hernández (loan return to Pachuca)
14	MF	MEX	Víctor Estrada (Unattached)
19	FW	MEX	Samuel González (to Tepatitlán)
20	DF	MEX	Jonathan Tovar (to Jaiba Brava)
23	DF	MEX	Axl Padilla (to Jaiba Brava)
31	MF	MEX	Benedit Bello (Unattached)
32	GK	MEX	Marco Millán (Unattached)
33	DF	MEX	Luis Basulto (Unattached)
35	DF	MEX	Hugo Hernández (Unattached)
36	DF	MEX	Tristhan Jaimes (to Oaxaca)
38	MF	COL	Jeferson Tenorio (Unattached)

== Atlas ==
In: Note: Flags indicate national team as defined under FIFA eligibility rules; some limited exceptions apply. Players may hold more than one non-FIFA nationality.

No.	Pos.	Nation	Player
3	DF	MEX	Jorge Sánchez (from (Greece) PAOK)
8	FW	MAR	Ryan Mmaee (from (Cyprus) Omonia)
9	FW	ARG	Florián Monzón (from (Argentina) Vélez Sarsfield)
10	MF	POR	Luís Esteves (from (Portugal) Gil Vicente)
11	FW	CPV	Duk (from (Spain) Leganés)
16	DF	ARG	Milton Valenzuela (from (Argentina) Independiente)
18	MF	MEX	Elías Montiel (from Pachuca)
19	DF	ARG	Adonis Frías (from (Brazil) Santos)
20	MF	ARG	Kevin Zenón (from (Argentina) Boca Juniors)
44	DF	MEX	Juanjo Purata (on loan from Tigres UANL)

Out: Note: Flags indicate national team as defined under FIFA eligibility rules; some limited exceptions apply. Players may hold more than one non-FIFA nationality.

No.	Pos.	Nation	Player
2	DF	BRA	Gustavo Ferrareis (Unattached)
8	MF	ARG	Mateo García (to (Argentina) Newell's Old Boys)
10	FW	ARG	Gustavo Del Prete (to (Argentina) San Lorenzo)
11	FW	PAR	Diego González (to Santos Laguna)
14	GK	MEX	César Ramos (loan return to Monterrey)
19	FW	MEX	Eduardo Aguirre (to Santos Laguna)
21	DF	ARG	Rodrigo Schlegel (Unattached)
44	DF	ESP	Róber Pier (to (Spain) Cultural Leonesa)

== Atlético San Luis ==
In: Note: Flags indicate national team as defined under FIFA eligibility rules; some limited exceptions apply. Players may hold more than one non-FIFA nationality.

No.	Pos.	Nation	Player
8	MF	MEX	Ronaldo Nájera (loan return from (Spain) Atlético Madrileño)
13	MF	COL	Johan Caicedo (from (Colombia) Deportivo Pasto)
22	MF	ESP	Rafa Llorente (from (Spain) Atlético Madrileño)
99	FW	CHI	Felipe Mora (from (United States) Portland Timbers)

Out: Note: Flags indicate national team as defined under FIFA eligibility rules; some limited exceptions apply. Players may hold more than one non-FIFA nationality.

No.	Pos.	Nation	Player
25	MF	MEX	Fidel Barajas (loan return to Guadalajara, later loaned to (United States) Monterey Bay)
—	GK	MEX	Diego Urtiaga (Unattached)

== Cruz Azul ==
In: Note: Flags indicate national team as defined under FIFA eligibility rules; some limited exceptions apply. Players may hold more than one non-FIFA nationality.

No.	Pos.	Nation	Player
2	DF	MEX	Alan Mozo (from Guadalajara, previously on loan at Pachuca)
12	DF	MEX	Alán Montes (from Necaxa, previously on loan at (Turkey) Serikspor)
13	GK	MEX	Ricardo Rodríguez (from Mazatlán)
14	FW	COL	Juan José Calero (from Venados)
15	DF	USA	Ralph Orquin (Free agent, last with América)

Out: Note: Flags indicate national team as defined under FIFA eligibility rules; some limited exceptions apply. Players may hold more than one non-FIFA nationality.

No.	Pos.	Nation	Player
—	FW	GRE	Giorgos Giakoumakis (to (United Arab Emirates) Al Ain, previously on loan at (Greece) PAOK)
—	DF	MEX	Mauro Zaleta (on loan to Necaxa, previously on loan at Mazatlán)

== Guadalajara ==
In: Note: Flags indicate national team as defined under FIFA eligibility rules; some limited exceptions apply. Players may hold more than one non-FIFA nationality.

No.	Pos.	Nation	Player
16	DF	MEX	Luis Rey (loan return from Puebla)
19	MF	MEX	Kevin Castañeda (from Tijuana)
33	MF	MEX	Jordán Carrillo (from Santos Laguna, previously on loan at Pumas UNAM)

Out: Note: Flags indicate national team as defined under FIFA eligibility rules; some limited exceptions apply. Players may hold more than one non-FIFA nationality.

No.	Pos.	Nation	Player
3	DF	MEX	Gilberto Sepúlveda (on loan to Juárez)
15	MF	MEX	Érick Gutiérrez (on loan to Toluca)
27	DF	MEX	Leonardo Sepúlveda (on loan to UdeG)
31	MF	MEX	Yael Padilla (to Tijuana)
34	FW	MEX	Armando González (to (Greece) Olympiacos)
—	MF	MEX	Víctor Guzmán (to Toluca, previously on loan at Pachuca)
—	DF	MEX	Diego Ochoa (on loan to Necaxa, previously on loan at Juárez)
—	MF	MEX	Fidel Barajas (on loan to (United States) Monterey Bay, previously on loan at Atlético San Luis)
—	DF	MEX	Alan Mozo (to Cruz Azul, previously on loan at Pachuca)

== Juárez ==
In: Note: Flags indicate national team as defined under FIFA eligibility rules; some limited exceptions apply. Players may hold more than one non-FIFA nationality.

No.	Pos.	Nation	Player
2	DF	MEX	Gilberto Sepúlveda (on loan from Guadalajara)
13	MF	BRA	Rodrigo Dourado (on loan from América)
15	MF	PAR	Lucas Romero (from (Paraguay) Recoleta)
16	MF	MEX	Juan Sigala (on loan from Pachuca)
25	MF	MEX	Said Godínez (from Mazatlán)
—	DF	CHI	Daniel Piña (from (Chile) Audax Italiano)

Out: Note: Flags indicate national team as defined under FIFA eligibility rules; some limited exceptions apply. Players may hold more than one non-FIFA nationality.

No.	Pos.	Nation	Player
3	DF	COL	Moisés Mosquera (to (United States) Sporting Kansas City)
10	MF	MEX	Rodolfo Pizarro (to Pachuca)
14	DF	MEX	Diego Ochoa (loan return to Guadalajara, later loaned to Necaxa)
18	MF	COL	Homer Martínez (on loan to (Colombia) Deportes Tolima)
26	DF	MEX	José Juan Manríquez (to (Ecuador) Universidad Católica)

== León ==
In: Note: Flags indicate national team as defined under FIFA eligibility rules; some limited exceptions apply. Players may hold more than one non-FIFA nationality.

No.	Pos.	Nation	Player
3	DF	COL	Juan Guevara (from (France) Bastia)
12	GK	MEX	Julio González (from Puebla)
14	DF	COL	Jhohan Romaña (from (Argentina) San Lorenzo)
15	MF	MEX	Sebastián Fierro (loan return from Mazatlán)
18	DF	COL	Edgar Guerra (loan return from Puebla)
21	FW	COL	Santiago Londoño (from (Colombia) Envigado)
199	MF	ARG	Santiago Colombatto (loan return from (Spain) Oviedo)

Out: Note: Flags indicate national team as defined under FIFA eligibility rules; some limited exceptions apply. Players may hold more than one non-FIFA nationality.

No.	Pos.	Nation	Player
1	GK	COL	Jordan García (on loan to Atlante)
3	DF	MEX	Paolo Medina (Unattached)
12	GK	MEX	Óscar Jiménez (to Atlante)
18	FW	MEX	Rogelio Funes Mori (to (Chile) Universidad de Concepción)
21	DF	COL	Jaine Barreiro (to (Colombia) Millonarios)
22	FW	ARG	Nicolás Vallejo (to Pachuca)
22	MF	MEX	Sebastián Santos (on loan to Pachuca, previously on loan at Mazatlán)
—	GK	MEX	Rodolfo Cota (to América)
—	DF	MEX	Óscar Villa (to Puebla, previously on loan at UdeG)
—	FW	URU	Federico Viñas (to Toluca, previously on loan at (Spain) Oviedo)
—	MF	URU	Nicolás Fonseca (on loan to (Brazil) Coritiba, previously on loan at (Spain) Oviedo)

== Monterrey ==
In: Note: Flags indicate national team as defined under FIFA eligibility rules; some limited exceptions apply. Players may hold more than one non-FIFA nationality.

No.	Pos.	Nation	Player
1	GK	ARG	Esteban Andrada (loan return from (Spain) Zaragoza)
9	FW	URU	Diego Rossi (from (United States) Columbus Crew)
18	MF	MEX	César Garza (loan return from Pumas UNAM)
25	MF	MEX	Orbelín Pineda (from (Greece) AEK Athens)
31	GK	MEX	César Ramos (loan return from Atlas)
99	FW	BEL	Hugo Cuypers (from (United States) Chicago Fire)

Out: Note: Flags indicate national team as defined under FIFA eligibility rules; some limited exceptions apply. Players may hold more than one non-FIFA nationality.

No.	Pos.	Nation	Player
9	FW	FRA	Anthony Martial (Unattached)
10	MF	ESP	Sergio Canales (to (Spain) Racing Santander)
23	DF	MEX	Gustavo Sánchez (to Atlante)
25	GK	URU	Santiago Mele (on loan to (Argentina) Independiente)
39	FW	MEX	Joaquín Moxica (on loan to Atlante)

== Necaxa ==
In: Note: Flags indicate national team as defined under FIFA eligibility rules; some limited exceptions apply. Players may hold more than one non-FIFA nationality.

No.	Pos.	Nation	Player
1	GK	MEX	Christopher Andrade (on loan from Cancún)
5	DF	BRA	Naves (from (Brazil) Palmeiras)
11	MF	COL	Juan Pablo Torres (from (Colombia) Atlético Nacional)
14	DF	MEX	Mauro Zaleta (on loan from Cruz Azul, previously on loan at Mazatlán)
15	DF	MEX	Diego Ochoa (on loan from Guadalajara, previously on loan at Juárez)
16	MF	MEX	Pedro Pedraza (on loan from Pachuca)
21	MF	ARG	Matías Espíndola (from (Uruguay) Maldonado)
88	DF	MEX	Carlos Vargas (Free agent, last with Cruz Azul)

Out: Note: Flags indicate national team as defined under FIFA eligibility rules; some limited exceptions apply. Players may hold more than one non-FIFA nationality.

No.	Pos.	Nation	Player
5	MF	ARG	Facundo Gutiérrez (to (Argentina) Argentinos Juniors)
9	FW	ARG	Tomás Badaloni (to (Argentina) Rosario Central)
10	MF	ARG	Agustín Almendra (to (Paraguay) Cerro Porteño)
16	DF	MEX	Cristian Calderón (loan return to América, later to Pumas UNAM)
22	GK	ARG	Ezequiel Unsain (to (Argentina) Talleres)
24	DF	MEX	Franco Rossano (loan return to América)
26	DF	MEX	Emilio Lara (loan return to América)
30	FW	MEX	Ricardo Monreal (to Tigres UANL)
—	MF	COL	Andrés Colorado (on loan to (Colombia) Once Caldas, previously on loan at (Colombia) Deportivo Cali)
—	DF	MEX	Alán Montes (to Cruz Azul, previously on loan at (Turkey) Serikspor)

== Pachuca ==
In: Note: Flags indicate national team as defined under FIFA eligibility rules; some limited exceptions apply. Players may hold more than one non-FIFA nationality.

No.	Pos.	Nation	Player
7	FW	ARG	Nicolás Vallejo (from León)
9	FW	PAR	Adrián Alcaraz (from (Paraguay) Olimpia)
19	FW	MEX	Illian Hernández (loan return from Atlante)
21	MF	MEX	Rodolfo Pizarro (from Juárez)
—	MF	MEX	Sebastián Santos (on loan from León, previously on loan at Mazatlán)

Out: Note: Flags indicate national team as defined under FIFA eligibility rules; some limited exceptions apply. Players may hold more than one non-FIFA nationality.

No.	Pos.	Nation	Player
5	MF	MEX	Pedro Pedraza (on loan to Necaxa)
7	MF	COL	Luis Quiñones (to (Colombia) América de Cali)
8	MF	MEX	Víctor Guzmán (loan return to Guadalajara, later to Toluca)
10	MF	MEX	Elías Montiel (to Atlas)
12	DF	MEX	Brian García (loan return to Toluca)
22	DF	MEX	Alan Mozo (loan return to Guadalajara, later to Cruz Azul)
190	MF	MEX	Juan Sigala (on loan to Juárez)
—	MF	URU	Santiago Homenchenko (to Querétaro, previously on loan to the same team)
—	FW	ECU	Enner Valencia (to (Argentina) Boca Juniors)

== Puebla ==
In: Note: Flags indicate national team as defined under FIFA eligibility rules; some limited exceptions apply. Players may hold more than one non-FIFA nationality.

No.	Pos.	Nation	Player
2	DF	MEX	Ángel Leyva (from Mazatlán)
3	MF	MEX	Alberto Herrera (from Mazatlán)
5	DF	ARG	Facundo Almada (from Mazatlán)
6	DF	MEX	Jair Díaz (from Mazatlán)
8	MF	MEX	Omar Moreno (from Mazatlán)
9	FW	VEN	Luifer Hernández (from (Ukraine) Polissya Zhytomyr)
10	MF	URU	Mathías Tomás (from (Switzerland) Thun)
15	DF	MEX	Óscar Villa (from León, previously on loan at UdeG)
21	MF	PAR	Sergio Sanabria (from (Paraguay) 2 de Mayo)
25	MF	MEX	Heriberto Jurado (on loan from (Belgium) Cercle Brugge)
34	MF	BRA	Lucas Camilo (from (Brazil) Botafogo)

Out: Note: Flags indicate national team as defined under FIFA eligibility rules; some limited exceptions apply. Players may hold more than one non-FIFA nationality.

No.	Pos.	Nation	Player
1	GK	MEX	Julio González (to León)
3	DF	MEX	Luis Rey (loan return to Guadalajara)
5	MF	MEX	Ulises Torres (to UdeG)
6	DF	CHI	Nicolás Díaz (loan return to Tijuana)
11	FW	URU	Emiliano Gómez (to Tigres UANL)
15	DF	COL	Edgar Guerra (loan return to León)
17	FW	MEX	Esteban Lozano (loan return to América, later loaned to Santos Laguna)
18	MF	PAR	Ariel Gamarra (loan return to (Argentina) Argentinos Juniors, later to (Paraguay) Cerro Porteño)
23	GK	MEX	Juan Pablo Gómez (to Piratas)
25	FW	ARG	Alexis Canelo (to (Argentina) Atlético Tucumán)
32	MF	CHI	Ángelo Araos (to (Chile) Unión Española)
—	DF	URU	Emanuel Gularte (on loan to (Spain) Sporting Gijón, previously on loan at (Uruguay) Peñarol)

== Pumas UNAM ==
In: Note: Flags indicate national team as defined under FIFA eligibility rules; some limited exceptions apply. Players may hold more than one non-FIFA nationality.

No.	Pos.	Nation	Player
10	MF	MEX	César Huerta (from (Belgium) Anderlecht)
12	DF	MEX	Cristian Calderón (from América, previously on loan at Necaxa)
14	MF	ARG	Luciano Herrera (on loan from (Argentina) Newell's Old Boys)
17	MF	MEX	Sebastián Córdova (from Toluca)
18	MF	MEX	Víctor Arteaga (from Toluca)

Out: Note: Flags indicate national team as defined under FIFA eligibility rules; some limited exceptions apply. Players may hold more than one non-FIFA nationality.

No.	Pos.	Nation	Player
14	MF	MEX	César Garza (loan return to Monterrey)
33	MF	MEX	Jordán Carrillo (loan return to Santos Laguna, later to Guadalajara)
—	DF	ARG	Nicolás Freire (to (Paraguay) Libertad, previously on loan at (Argentina) Independiente)
—	MF	PER	Piero Quispe (to (Peru) Universitario, previously on loan at (Australia) Sydney FC)

== Querétaro ==
In: Note: Flags indicate national team as defined under FIFA eligibility rules; some limited exceptions apply. Players may hold more than one non-FIFA nationality.

No.	Pos.	Nation	Player
5	MF	URU	Santiago Homenchenko (from Pachuca, previously on loan from the same team)
7	MF	ESP	Iker Benito (from (Spain) Osasuna)
12	DF	BRA	Paulo Victor (from (Portugal) Santa Clara)
16	MF	PAR	Enzo Giménez (from (Argentina) Rosario Central)
17	MF	MEX	Denilson Muñoz (from UdeG)

Out: Note: Flags indicate national team as defined under FIFA eligibility rules; some limited exceptions apply. Players may hold more than one non-FIFA nationality.

No.	Pos.	Nation	Player
7	MF	ECU	Jhojan Julio (to Atlante)
10	MF	ARG	Lucas Rodríguez (Unattached)
12	MF	MEX	Jaime Gómez (Unattached)
13	MF	MEX	Eduardo Armenta (to Puebla)
21	MF	MEX	Fernando González (to Sinaloa)
24	GK	MEX	Luis Villegas (Unattached)
33	MF	MEX	Luis Gutiérrez (Unattached)
35	FW	MEX	Juan Cázares (on loan to UdeG)
55	MF	ECU	Michael Carcelén (to (Ecuador) Aucas)

== Santos Laguna ==
In: Note: Flags indicate national team as defined under FIFA eligibility rules; some limited exceptions apply. Players may hold more than one non-FIFA nationality.

No.	Pos.	Nation	Player
3	DF	USA	Mauricio Cuevas (from (United States) LA Galaxy)
7	FW	PAR	Diego González (from Atlas)
15	FW	MEX	Joshua Mancha (from (Spain) Sporting Atlético)
18	DF	ARG	Franco Pardo (from (Argentina) Racing)
19	FW	MEX	Eduardo Aguirre (from Atlas)
20	FW	MEX	Esteban Lozano (loan return from América, previously on loan at Puebla)
23	MF	ARG	Facundo Cáseres (from (Portugal) Gil Vicente)
25	DF	ARG	Felipe Sánchez (from (Germany) Schalke 04)

Out: Note: Flags indicate national team as defined under FIFA eligibility rules; some limited exceptions apply. Players may hold more than one non-FIFA nationality.

No.	Pos.	Nation	Player
7	FW	COL	Cristian Dájome (to (Colombia) Inter Bogotá)
11	FW	HON	Anthony Lozano (Unattached)
11	MF	ECU	Carlos Gruezo (Unattached)
13	FW	MEX	Jesús Ocejo (to Jaiba Brava)
35	MF	COL	Kevin Balanta (on loan to (Colombia) Independiente Santa Fe)
—	MF	MEX	Jordán Carrillo (to Guadalajara, previously on loan at Pumas UNAM)

== Tigres UANL ==
In: Note: Flags indicate national team as defined under FIFA eligibility rules; some limited exceptions apply. Players may hold more than one non-FIFA nationality.

No.	Pos.	Nation	Player
15	DF	ARG	Alan Franco (on loan from (Brazil) São Paulo)
19	MF	MEX	Mauro Lainez (from Mazatlán)
21	FW	MEX	Ricardo Monreal (from Necaxa)
—	FW	URU	Emiliano Gómez (from Puebla)

Out: Note: Flags indicate national team as defined under FIFA eligibility rules; some limited exceptions apply. Players may hold more than one non-FIFA nationality.

No.	Pos.	Nation	Player
4	DF	MEX	Juanjo Purata (on loan to Atlas)
7	MF	ARG	Ángel Correa (to (Argentina) River Plate)
19	DF	MEX	Iván López (loan return to Toluca)

== Tijuana ==
In: Note: Flags indicate national team as defined under FIFA eligibility rules; some limited exceptions apply. Players may hold more than one non-FIFA nationality.

No.	Pos.	Nation	Player
11	MF	ARG	Francisco González (from (Chile) O'Higgins)
13	FW	BRA	Elias Manoel (from (Brazil) Botafogo)
31	MF	MEX	Yael Padilla (from Guadalajara)

Out: Note: Flags indicate national team as defined under FIFA eligibility rules; some limited exceptions apply. Players may hold more than one non-FIFA nationality.

No.	Pos.	Nation	Player
10	MF	MEX	Kevin Castañeda (to Guadalajara)
25	MF	MEX	Óscar Manzanarez (to Jaiba Brava)
27	MF	ARG	Domingo Blanco (to (Argentina) Defensa y Justicia)
30	FW	VEN	Josef Martínez (to (United States) Columbus Crew)
32	DF	ECU	Diogo Bagüí (on loan to Atlante)
—	DF	CHI	Nicolás Díaz (on loan to (Peru) Alianza Lima, previously on loan at Puebla)

== Toluca ==
In: Note: Flags indicate national team as defined under FIFA eligibility rules; some limited exceptions apply. Players may hold more than one non-FIFA nationality.

No.	Pos.	Nation	Player
7	MF	MEX	Víctor Guzmán (from Guadalajara, previously on loan at Pachuca)
16	FW	URU	Federico Viñas (from León, previously on loan at (Spain) Oviedo)
17	DF	MEX	Brian García (loan return from Pachuca)
35	MF	MEX	Érick Gutiérrez (on loan from Guadalajara)
—	DF	MEX	Iván López (loan return from Tigres UANL)

Out: Note: Flags indicate national team as defined under FIFA eligibility rules; some limited exceptions apply. Players may hold more than one non-FIFA nationality.

No.	Pos.	Nation	Player
7	MF	MEX	Sebastián Córdova (to Pumas UNAM)
27	FW	URU	Franco Rossi (on loan to (Brazil) Chapecoense)
33	MF	MEX	Víctor Arteaga (to Pumas UNAM)
