= Efraín Juárez =

Mexican footballer and manager (born 1988)

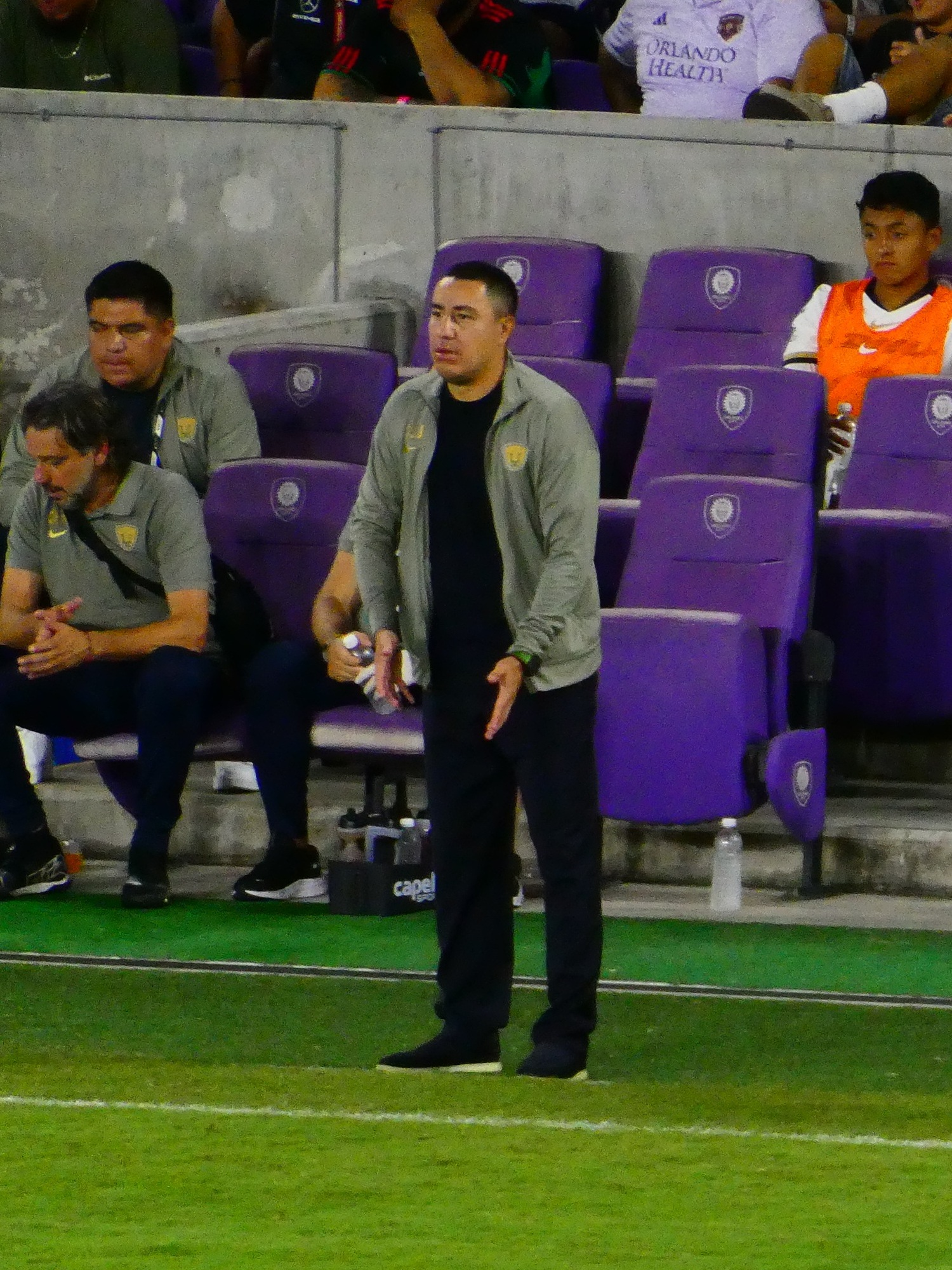
- Juárez with UNAM in 2026

Personal information
- Full name: Efraín Juárez Valdez
- Date of birth: 22 February 1988 (age 38)
- Place of birth: Mexico City, Mexico
- Height: 1.78 m (5 ft 10 in)
- Positions: Defensive midfielder; right-back

Team information
- Current team: ETO Győr (head coach)

Youth career
- 2001–2006: Pumas UNAM
- 2006–2008: Barcelona

Senior career*
Years	Team	Apps	(Gls)
2006–2008	Barcelona B		
2008	Pumas Morelos	11	(0)
2008–2010	Pumas UNAM	66	(0)
2010–2012	Celtic	13	(0)
2011	→ Zaragoza (loan)	15	(1)
2012–2014	América	6	(0)
2013–2014	→ Monterrey (loan)	22	(1)
2014–2018	Monterrey	74	(2)
2018	Vancouver Whitecaps FC	16	(0)
2019	Vålerenga	19	(0)
Total		242	(4)

International career
2005	Mexico U17	5	(1)
2007	Mexico U20	4	(1)
2009–2012	Mexico	39	(1)

Managerial career
- 2020–2022: New York City (assistant)
- 2022–2023: Standard Liège (assistant)
- 2023–2024: Club Brugge (assistant)
- 2024–2025: Atlético Nacional
- 2025–2026: Pumas UNAM
- 2026–: ETO Győr
Medal record
Representing Mexico
Winner	FIFA U-17 World Championship	2005
Winner	CONCACAF Gold Cup	2009
Winner	CONCACAF Gold Cup	2011
- * Club domestic league appearances and goals

Efraín Juárez Valdez (born 22 February 1988) is a Mexican professional football manager and former player. He is the current head coach of Nemzeti Bajnokság I club ETO Győr.

== Club career ==
=== Early career ===
Juárez joined Pumas UNAM at the age of thirteen. Following Mexico's triumph at the 2005 FIFA U-17 World Championship, he was signed by Barcelona alongside teammate Jorge Hernández. Limited playing time with Barcelona B led him back to Pumas, where he continued his development until coach Ricardo Ferretti promoted him to the first team. Juárez soon became a regular starter, and in the Clausura 2009 tournament, he helped Pumas secure the league title with a victory over Pachuca in the final.

=== Celtic ===
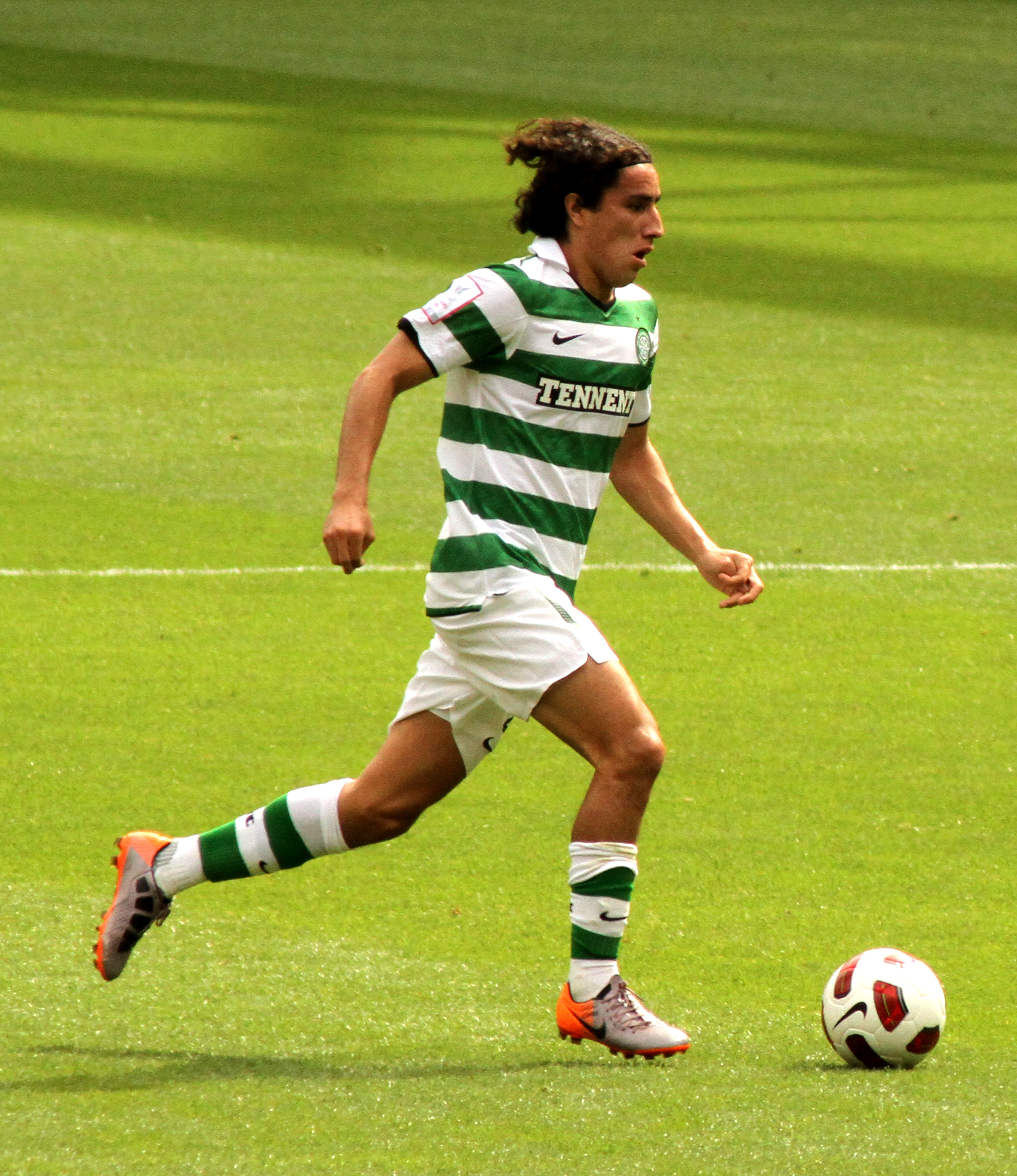
Juárez with Celtic in 2010

On 17 July 2010, Pumas accepted a bid for Juárez from Scottish Premier League club Celtic. On 26 July a £2 million transfer was agreed and Juárez signed a four-year contract with The Hoops, making him the first ever Mexican player to play in the SPL. Juárez made his Celtic debut in a 3–0 Champions League defeat away to Braga. He scored his first goal for the club in the return fixture at Celtic Park with a header. He then scored his second goal, again at Celtic Park, in a Europa League qualifying first leg match against Utrecht two weeks later. Juárez was close to agreeing a loan move to Serie A side Brescia Calcio in the January 2011 transfer window but the deal fell through. He had fallen out of favour with the first team and his agent admitted that Juárez would need to move on in the summer of 2011 in order to play first team football.

==== Real Zaragoza (loan) ====
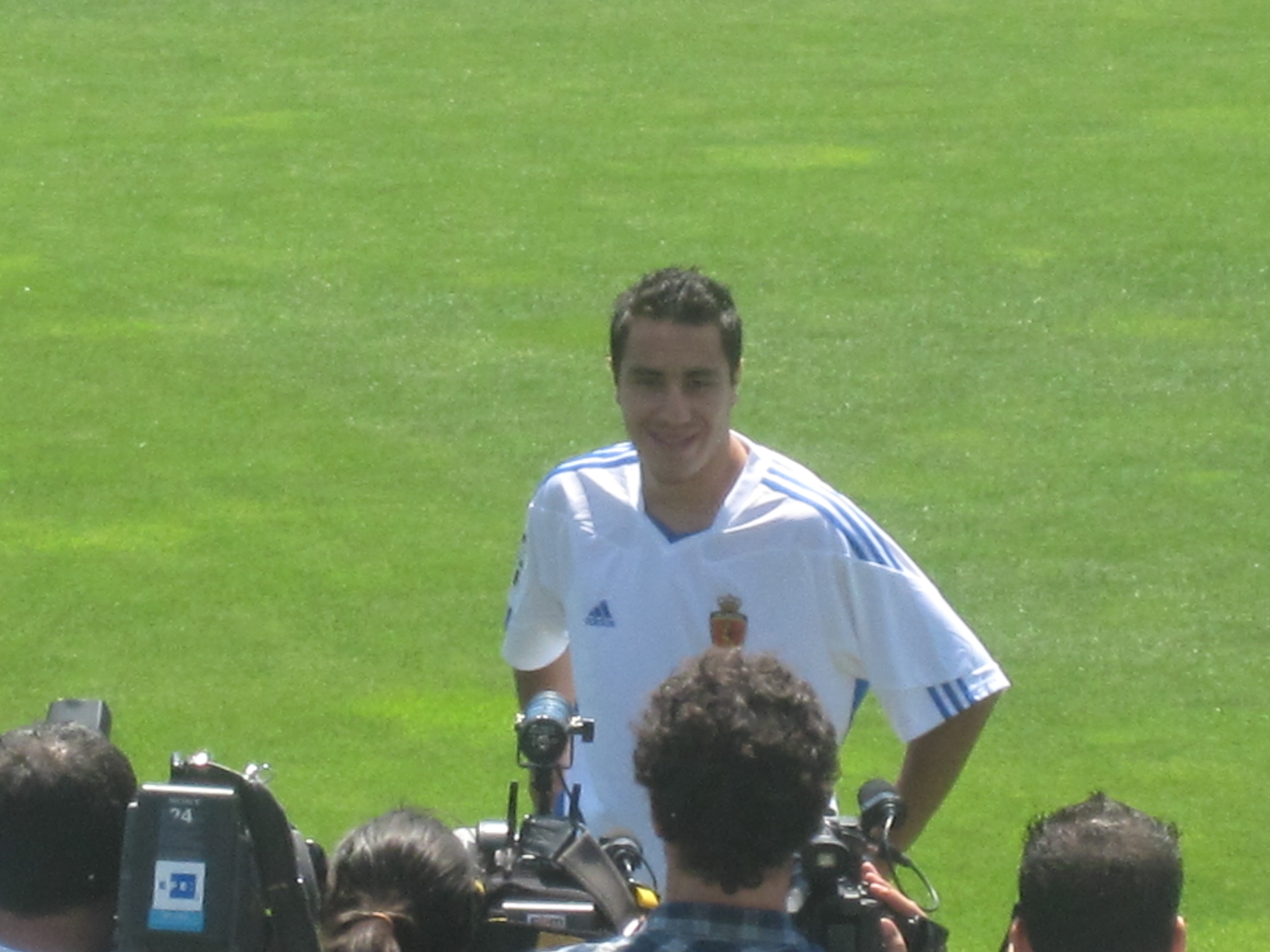
Juarez during his tenure at Zaragoza

On 26 July 2011, after weeks of speculation, Juárez was loaned out to La Liga side Real Zaragoza, where he was reunited with former Mexico national team coach Javier Aguirre. He made his debut for Zaragoza in a 6–0 loss against Real Madrid. He then scored his first goal for the club in a 4–3 defeat to Real Betis.

=== América ===
On 5 June 2012 it was announced that Juárez had transferred to Club América in Mexico for an undisclosed fee, after failing to cement his place in the starting line-up for Celtic, and after his disappointing stint for Real Zaragoza. He made his first appearance for América on 27 June in a 0–2 preseason loss against Jaguares. He made his league debut on 21 July in a 0–0 draw against Monterrey. On 22 August 2012, Juárez suffered a dislocation of his elbow during a Copa MX game against Correcaminos in the 39th minute. The club announced he would miss three weeks and would another three weeks of recovery.

=== Monterrey ===
Juárez signed with CF Monterrey on 5 June 2013. On 5 March 2016, Juárez would score the winning goal against their fiercest rivals, Tigres in a 1–0 win. He would play a crucial role in the Copa MX in 2017 as Monterrey would win the competition against Pachuca on 21 December 2017, days after the team lost the league final against their fiercest rivals, Tigres. This would be his longest tenure at any club in his career staying for 4 years and also being one of his most consistent. Juárez would leave Monterrey at the end of the year.

=== Vancouver Whitecaps FC ===
Juárez signed with Vancouver Whitecaps FC of Major League Soccer on 18 January 2018. On 1 February 2019, Juárez and Vancouver mutually agreed to part ways.

== International career ==
On 28 June 2009, Juárez made his first international cap with the senior national team against Guatemala. He played a part of the team that won the 2009 CONCACAF Gold Cup. In the Gold Cup, he mainly played at right back. He started and completed all games played in the competition. Thanks to his great performance, he quickly gained a spot on the national team. Juárez scored for Mexico against Costa Rica during a penalty shootout.

On 11 June 2010, Juárez became the first player to be booked at the 2010 World Cup in Mexico's opening match against South Africa. He also played in Mexico's 2–0 victory over France on 17 June, when he was replaced by Javier Hernández on 55 minutes, who later himself went on to score.

On 22 September 2010, it was announced that Juárez and Mexico teammate Carlos Vela were banned from international duty for six months for their involvement in a party in Monterrey following a game with Colombia two weeks earlier.

Juárez scored his first national team goal in the 5–0 win against El Salvador in the opening match of the 2011 CONCACAF Gold Cup on 5 June.

== Managerial career ==
=== Early career ===
Following his retirement as a footballer, Juárez assumed the role of technical assistant within the staff of Ronny Deila. He held this position at New York City FC, Standard Liège and Club Brugge.

=== Atlético Nacional ===
On 28 August 2024, Colombian club Atlético Nacional announced Juárez as their new head coach. His appointment was poorly received by local fans and media, who criticized the lack of experience of the foreign coach. On 17 November, during the Copa Colombia semifinal match against Independiente Medellín, Juárez was celebrating his team's victory after the full-time whistle when he was shown a red card and promptly escorted out of the stadium by Medellín police and stadium officials. The Colombian Football Federation announced that Juárez would be banned from all Colombian stadiums for three years and fined 26 million Colombian pesos for his "provocative" celebrations. On 27 December, the sanction was revoked.

On 15 December, Juárez captured his first managerial title as Atlético Nacional lifted the Copa Colombia trophy. Just a week later, he guided the club to its 18th league championship, becoming only the third manager in Colombian football history to achieve the coveted double. Less than a month afterward, on 14 January 2025, Juárez resigned from his post following disagreements with the club's management.

=== Pumas UNAM ===
On 2 March 2025, Efraín became the head coach of his boyhood club Pumas UNAM replacing Argentine Gustavo Lema. Two days later his first match and win was against Alajuelense 2–0 at home in the Champions Cup. In Liga MX he could get key points to secure play-in phase against FC Juárez winning in a thrilling penalty shootout with Álex Padilla as man of the match.

For his first full regular season as Pumas manager he brought signings that some of them became key players next season such as: Keylor Navas, Aaron Ramsey, Álvaro Angulo, Pedro Vite and Alan Medina. He once again qualified in tenth for play-in phase losing against Pachuca.

For the Clausura 2026 he managed to be first manager to break the 35 point-club record in a regular tournament, managing to reach the Liguilla final against Cruz Azul later losing it in second leg game at home 1–2.

On 8 June 2026, it was announced that Juárez would not continue as manager at the express request of the coach.

=== Győr ===
On 17 June 2026, he was appointed as the coach of Hungarian Nemzeti Bajnokság I champion club ETO Győr. Juárez debuted with a 1–0 defeat from Víkingur Reykjavík at the Víkingsvöllur in Reykjavík in the first round of the 2026–27 UEFA Champions League qualifying. On 16 July 2026, Győr drew (2–2) with Vikingur at ETO Park and were eliminated from the UEFA Champions League.

== Career statistics ==
=== Club ===
As of 9 November 2013

Club performance			League		Cup		League cup		Continental		Total	
Season	Club	League	Apps	Goals	Apps	Goals	Apps	Goals	Apps	Goals	Apps	Goals
Mexico			League		Cup		League cup		North America		Total	
2008–09	Pumas UNAM	Primera División	41	0					2	1	43	1
2009–10			25	0					4	0	29	0
Scotland			League		Scottish Cup		League Cup		Europe		Total	
2010–11	Celtic	SPL	13	0	1	0	2	0	4	2	21	2
Spain			League		Copa del Rey		Supercopa de España		Europe		Total	
2011–12	Real Zaragoza	La Liga	15	1							15	1
Mexico			League		Cup		League cup		North America		Total	
2012–13	América	Liga MX	6	0	3	0					9	0
Mexico			League		Cup		League cup		North America		Total	
2013–14	Monterrey	Liga MX	11	0					1	0	12	0
Total	Mexico		83	0	3	0	0	0	7	1	93	1
Total	Scotland		13	0	1	0	2	0	4	2	20	2
Total	Spain		15	1	0	0	0	0	0	0	15	1
Career total			111	1	3	0	2	0	11	3	127	4

=== International ===
As of 29 February 2012

National team	Year	Apps	Goals
Mexico	2009	9	0
Mexico	2010	16	0
Mexico	2011	14	1
Mexico	Total	39	1

=== International goals ===
Scores and results list Mexico's goal tally first

No.	Date	Venue	Opponent	Score	Result	Competition	Ref.
1.	5 June 2011	Cowboys Stadium, Arlington, United States	El Salvador	1–0	5–0	2011 CONCACAF Gold Cup	

== Managerial statistics ==
As of 21 November 2026

Team	Nat	From	To	Record							
Team	Nat	From	To	G	W	D	L	GF	GA	GD	Win %
Atlético Nacional	(Colombia)	28 August 2024	14 January 2025	27	14	8	5	44	24	+20	51.85
Pumas UNAM	(Mexico)	2 March 2025	8 June 2026	59	22	21	16	92	81	+11	37.29
Győri	(Hungary)	17 June 2026	present	22	9	8	5	41	28	+13	40.91
Total				108	45	37	26	177	133	+44	41.67

== Honours ==
=== Player ===
Pumas UNAM

- Mexican Primera División: Clausura 2009

Celtic

- Scottish Cup: 2010–11

América

- Liga MX: Clausura 2013

Monterrey

- Copa MX: Apertura 2017

Mexico U17

- FIFA U-17 World Championship: 2005

Mexico

- CONCACAF Gold Cup: 2009, 2011

=== Manager ===
Atlético Nacional

- Copa Colombia: 2024
- Categoría Primera A: 2024–II

Pumas UNAM

- Liga MX runner-up: Clausura 2026

Individual

- The Best of America Best Categoría Primera A Manager: 2024
- Liga MX Manager of the Month: April 2026
- Liga MX Best XI Manager: Clausura 2026
