= Pablo Lara =

Pablo Lara may refer to:

- Pablo Lara (weightlifter) (born 1968), Cuban weightlifter
- Pablo Lara (footballer) (born 2005), Mexican footballer
