= Nicolás Vallejo =

Argentine footballer (born 2004)

Personal information
- Full name: Javier Nicolás Vallejo
- Date of birth: 3 January 2004 (age 22)
- Place of birth: Saenz Peña, Argentina
- Height: 1.70 m (5 ft 7 in)
- Position: Forward

Team information
- Current team: Pachuca (on loan from León)
- Number: 21

Senior career*
| Years | Team | Apps | (Gls) |
| 2022–2025 | Independiente | 36 | (3) |
| 2023–2024 | → Talleres (loan) | 9 | (0) |
| 2025 | → Liverpool Montevideo (loan) | 30 | (3) |
| 2026– | León | 9 | (0) |
| 2026– | → Pachuca (loan) | 16 | (0) |

International career^{‡}
| 2023 | Argentina U20 | 2 | (0) |
- * Club domestic league appearances and goals as of 4 July 2026 ‡ National team caps and goals as of 11 November 2023

Javier Nicolás Vallejo (born 3 January 2004) is an Argentinian footballer who plays as a forward for Liga MX club Pachuca, on loan from León.

== Club career ==
From Chaco Province, Vallejo signed a contract in 2022 keeping him with Independiente until December 2024. In his first league start for the club he scored the only goal of the game in a 1–0 win over Arsenal de Sarandí on the 2 October 2022. This came just days after he missed a spot kick in a penalty shoot out that saw his club defeated in the Copa Argentina. That same month he was celebrated as he scored a late equaliser for this club in a 2-2 league draw against Boca Juniors.

In August 2023, he signed on loan for Talleres de Córdoba.

In February 2025, he moved abroad to join Uruguayan Primera División club Liverpool Montevideo on a year-long loan, with an option to buy.

In December 2025, Vallejo was transferred to Mexican club León.

On 3 July 2026 Vallejo signed with Pachuca.

== International career ==
He was named in the Argentina under-20 squad by Javier Mascherano for the 2023 South American U-20 Championship held in Colombia in January and February 2023.
