= Pablo Bennevendo =

Mexican footballer (born 2000)

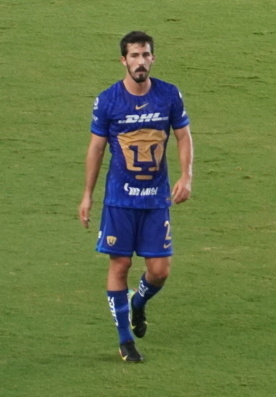
- Bennevendo with Pumas in 2025

Personal information
- Full name: Pablo Bennevendo Peña
- Date of birth: 3 January 2000 (age 26)
- Place of birth: Mexico City, Mexico
- Height: 1.77 m (5 ft 10 in)
- Position: Full-back

Team information
- Current team: Pumas UNAM
- Number: 2

Youth career
- 2018–2021: Pumas

Senior career*
Years	Team	Apps	(Gls)
2021–	Pumas UNAM	139	(1)
2021–2022	→ Pumas Tabasco (loan)	30	(1)
- * Club domestic league appearances and goals as of 21 November 2026

Pablo Bennevendo Peña (born 3 January 2000) is a Mexican professional footballer who plays as a full-back for Liga MX club Pumas UNAM.

== Career statistics ==
=== Club ===
As of match played on 21 November 2026

Club	Season	League			Cup		Continental		Other		Total	
Club	Season	Division	Apps	Goals	Apps	Goals	Apps	Goals	Apps	Goals	Apps	Goals
Pumas	2021–22	Liga MX	3	0	—		—		—		3	0
Pumas	2022–23	Liga MX	28	0	4 (Note: Appearances in Copa Sky por México)	0	—		—		32	0
Pumas	2023–24	Liga MX	28	0	—		—		3 (Note: Appearances in Leagues Cup)	0	31	0
Pumas	2024–25	Liga MX	34	1	—		6 (Note: Appearances in CONCACAF Champions Cup)	0	4	0	44	1
Pumas	2025–26	Liga MX	33	0	—		—		3	0	36	0
Pumas	2026–27	Liga MX	13	0	—		—		1	0	14	0
Pumas	Total		139	1	4	0	6	0	11	0	160	1
Pumas Tabasco (loan)	2021–22	Liga de Expansión MX	30	1	—		—		—		30	1
Career total			169	2	4	0	6	0	11	0	190	2
