= José Caicedo =

Colombian footballer (born 2002)

- Caicedo with Portland Timbers in 2026

Personal information
- Full name: José Luis Caicedo Barrera
- Date of birth: 23 May 2002 (age 24)
- Place of birth: Palmira, Colombia
- Height: 1.84 m (6 ft 0 in)
- Positions: Defensive midfielder; sweeper

Team information
- Current team: Portland Timbers
- Number: 30

Youth career
- –2019: Independiente Santa Fe

Senior career*
Years	Team	Apps	(Gls)
2019	Independiente Santa Fe	4	(0)
2020	Barranquilla	1	(0)
2020–2021	Pumas Tabasco	13	(0)
2022–2026	UNAM	86	(3)
2026–	Portland Timbers	0	(0)

International career^{‡}
2019	Colombia U17	3	(0)
- * Club domestic league appearances and goals as of 09:24, 19 September 2022 (UTC) ‡ National team caps and goals as of 10 November 2019 (UTC)

José Luis Caicedo Barrera (born 23 May 2002) is a Colombian professional footballer who plays as a defensive midfielder and sweeper for Major League Soccer club Portland Timbers.

== Career statistics ==
=== Club ===
As of 10 February 2021

Club	Season	League			Cup		Other		Total	
Club	Season	Division	Apps	Goals	Apps	Goals	Apps	Goals	Apps	Goals
Santa Fe	2019	Categoría Primera A	4	0	1 (Note: Appearances in the Copa Colombia)	0	0	0	5	0
Barranquilla	2020	Categoría Primera B	1	0	2	0	0	0	3	0
Pumas Tabasco	2020–22	Liga de Expansión MX	13	0	0	0	0	0	13	0
UNAM	2022–ACT	Liga MX	9	0	0	0	0	0	9	0
Career total			15	0	3	0	0	0	21	0
