= Diogo Bagüí =

Ecuadorian footballer (born 20056)

Personal information
- Full name: Diogo Osmar Bagüí Tobar
- Date of birth: 20 March 2005 (age 21)
- Place of birth: Riobamba, Ecuador
- Height: 1.80 m (5 ft 11 in)
- Position: Centre-back

Team information
- Current team: Atlante (on loan from Tijuana)
- Number: 32

Youth career
- 2014–2024: Emelec

Senior career*
Years	Team	Apps	(Gls)
2023–2025	Emelec	50	(2)
2026–	Tijuana	1	(0)
2026–	→ Atlante (loan)	1	(0)

International career^{‡}
2024–	Ecuador U20	2	(0)
- * Club domestic league appearances and goals as of 21:45, 24 October 2025 (UTC) ‡ National team caps and goals as of 20 December 2024 (UTC)

Diogo Bagüí (born 20 March 2005) is an Ecuadorian professional footballer who plays as a central defender for Liga MX club Atlante, on loan from Tijuana.

== Club career ==
=== Emelec ===
Born in Riobamba, Bagüí began his career in the youth academy of Emelec at the age of nine. The son of Emelec legend Óscar Bagüí, Diogo quickly moved up in the clubs youth ranks, being called up to the first team due to an injury to Aníbal Leguizamón. He made his debut with Emelec on 23 September 2023, appearing as a starter in a 3–1 victory over Mushuc Runa.

During the 2024 season Bagüí became a starter with the club after the unexpected departure of Aníbal Leguizamón to Club Atlético Belgrano. On 22 September 2024, Bagüí scored his first goal for Emelec, the opening goal in a 3–1 victory over Técnico Universitario. On 23 November 2024, he scored the equalizer in a 2–2 draw with Imbabura Sporting Club.

Bagüí became firmly established as a starter with Emelec during the 2025 season, appearing in 37 matches and scoring 1 goal. After the season he left the club and received interest from various clubs in other leagues, most notably Xolos de Tijuana in Mexico.

On 15 June 2026, Tijuana loaned Bagüí to Atlante.

== International career ==
Bagüí was called up to the Ecuador under-20 team for the 2025 South American U-20 Championship. However, he was unable to participate in the tournament as he suffered an injury while training with Ecuador.
