= César Huerta =

Mexican footballer (born 2000)

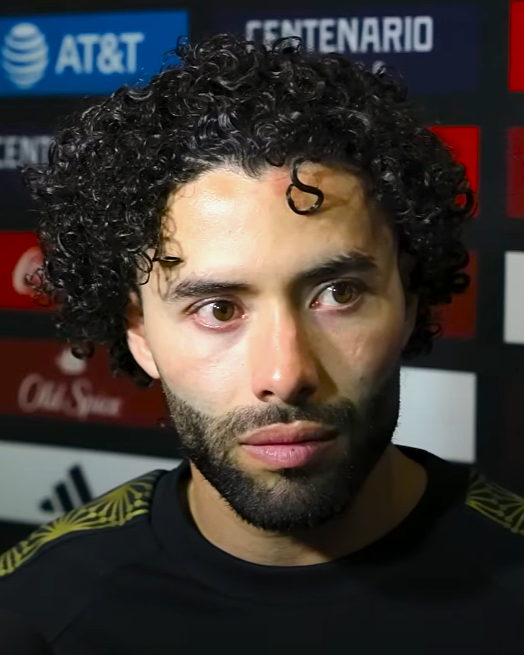
- Huerta with Mexico in 2025

Personal information
- Full name: César Saúl Huerta Valera
- Date of birth: 3 December 2000 (age 25)
- Place of birth: Guadalajara, Jalisco, Mexico
- Height: 1.71 m (5 ft 7 in)
- Position: Winger

Team information
- Current team: Pumas UNAM
- Number: 10

Youth career
- 2015–2018: Guadalajara

Senior career*
Years	Team	Apps	(Gls)
2018–2022	Guadalajara	35	(1)
2019	→ Zacatepec (loan)	13	(4)
2020	→ Morelia (loan)	6	(0)
2020	→ Mazatlán (loan)	17	(3)
2021	→ Tapatío (loan)	1	(0)
2022–2024	Pumas UNAM	80	(18)
2025–2026	Anderlecht	28	(4)
2026–	Pumas UNAM	8	(2)

International career^{‡}
2016–2017	Mexico U17	9	(1)
2023–	Mexico	27	(3)
Medal record
Men's football
Representing Mexico
CONCACAF Gold Cup
Winner	2025 United States–Canada	Team
CONCACAF Nations League
Winner	2025 United States
CONCACAF U-17 Championship
Winner	2017 Panama	Team
- * Club domestic league appearances and goals as of 21 November 2026 ‡ National team caps and goals as of 19 June 2026

César Saúl Huerta Valera (born 3 December 2000) is a Mexican professional footballer who plays as a winger for Liga MX club Pumas UNAM and the Mexico national team.

== Club career ==
=== Early career ===
Huerta's career began at the youth academy of his hometown club, Guadalajara. He made his professional debut on 10 November 2018, coming off the bench in a league match against León.

After a brief spell with Ascenso MX club Atlético Zacatepec, Huerta joined Monarcas Morelia on loan. Six months later, he moved to Mazatlán following the franchise's relocation.

On 27 July 2020, Mazatlán made their debut in an official match, with Huerta scoring the very first official goal for the club.

=== Pumas ===
Upon returning to Guadalajara, Huerta was unable to secure a place in the starting lineup and requested a transfer. In June 2022, he was transferred to Pumas UNAM.

=== Anderlecht ===
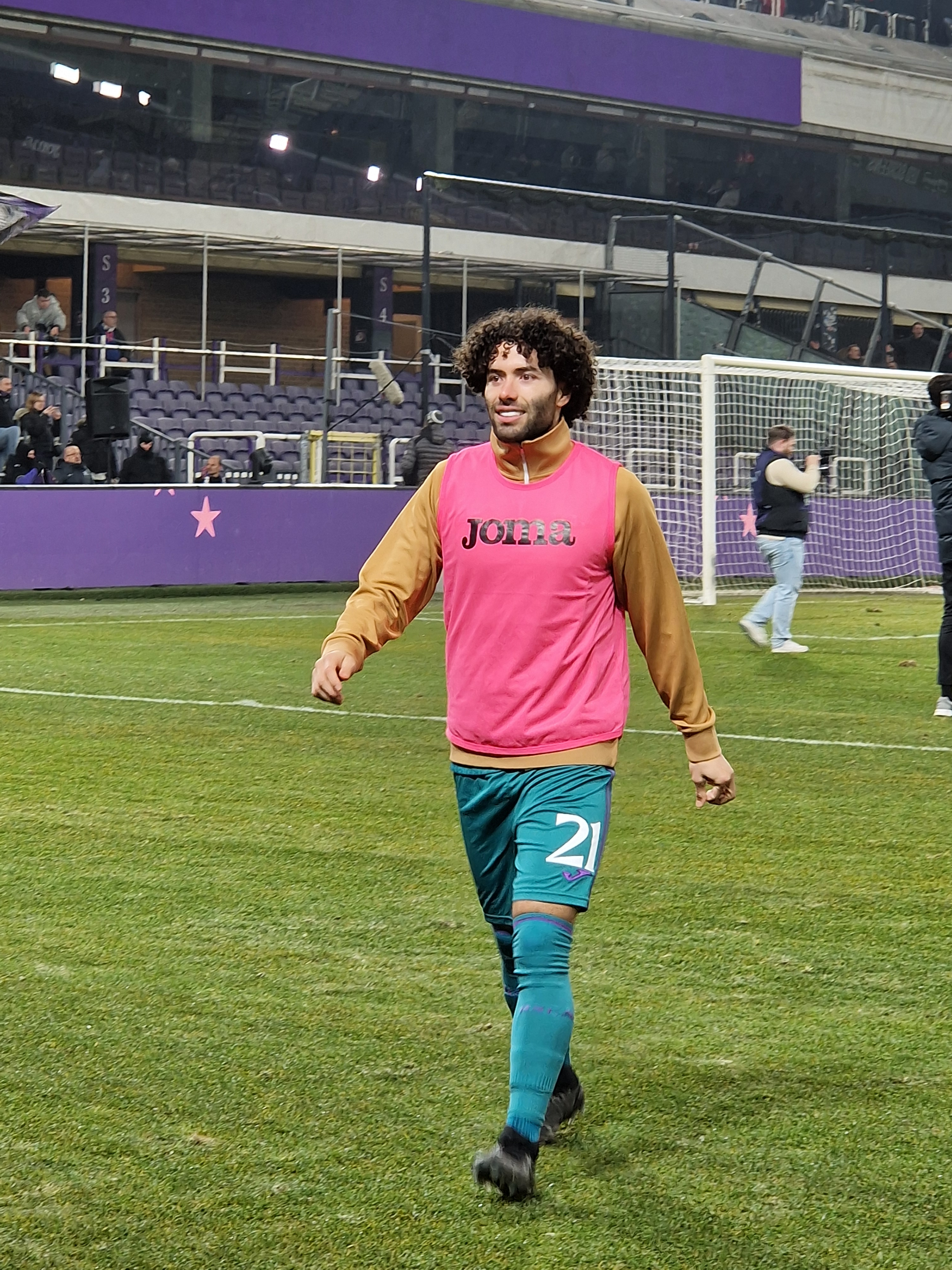
Huerta in 2025

In January 2025, Huerta joined Belgian Pro League club Anderlecht on a four-year contract.

On 19 January, Huerta made his debut with the club in a league match against Kortrijk, coming on as a substitute and scoring in a 2–0 win.

On 4 May, Huerta was in the starting line-up that played the 2025 Belgian Cup final against Club Brugge, where he was substituted off during the second half as Anderlecht lost 2–1.

=== Return to Pumas ===
On 27 August 2026, Huerta returned to Mexico to sign with Pumas.

== International career ==
=== Youth ===
Huerta was called up by Mario Arteaga to be part of the squad that participated at the 2017 CONCACAF U-17 Championship and subsequently won. He was also called up to participate at the 2017 FIFA U-17 World Cup.

=== Senior ===
In August 2023, Huerta received his first call-up to the senior national team by manager Jaime Lozano, for two friendly matches against Australia and Uzbekistan.

Huerta made his senior debut for Mexico on 9 September 2023, in a friendly match against Australia, entering in the second half for Alexis Vega at the 60th minute and later scoring the 2–2 equalizer towards the end of the match in the 83rd minute.

Huerta was named in the 26-man squad for the 2026 FIFA World Cup, hosted on home soil.

== Career statistics ==
=== Club ===
As of match played on 21 November 2026

Appearances and goals by club, season and competition
Club	Season	League			National cup (Note: Includes Copa MX, Belgian Cup)		Continental		Other		Total	
Club	Season	Division	Apps	Goals	Apps	Goals	Apps	Goals	Apps	Goals	Apps	Goals
Guadalajara	2018–19	Liga MX	1	0	—		—		—		1	0
Guadalajara	2019–20	Liga MX	5	0	4	0	—		—		9	0
Guadalajara	2020–21	Liga MX	9	0	—		—		—		9	0
Guadalajara	2021–22	Liga MX	20	1	—		—		—		20	1
Guadalajara	Total		35	1	4	0	—		—		39	1
Zacatepec (loan)	2018–19	Ascenso MX	13	4	4	2	—		—		17	6
Morelia (loan)	2019–20	Liga MX	6	0	4	0	—		—		10	0
Mazatlán (loan)	2020–21	Liga MX	17	3	2 (Note: Appearances in Copa GNP por México)	0	—		—		19	3
Tapatío (loan)	2020–21	Liga de Expansión MX	1	0	—		—		—		1	0
Pumas UNAM	2022–23	Liga MX	26	2	—		—		—		26	2
Pumas UNAM	2023–24	Liga MX	37	11	—		—		3 (Note: Appearances in Leagues Cup)	1	40	12
Pumas UNAM	2024–25	Liga MX	17	5	—		—		4	1	21	6
Pumas UNAM	Total		80	18	—		—		7	2	87	20
Anderlecht	2024–25	Belgian Pro League	17	3	2	0	2 (Note: Appearances in UEFA Europa League)	0	—		21	3
Anderlecht	2025–26	Belgian Pro League	11	1	2	1	4 (Note: Appearances in UEFA Conference League)	0	—		17	2
Anderlecht	Total		28	4	4	1	6	0	—		38	5
Pumas UNAM	2026–27	Liga MX	8	2	—		—		—		8	2
Career total			188	32	18	3	6	0	7	2	219	37

=== International ===
As of match played on 18 June 2026

Appearances and goals by national team and year
National team	Year	Apps	Goals
Mexico	2023	6	1
Mexico	2024	9	2
Mexico	2025	10	0
Mexico	2026	2	0
Total		27	3

Scores and results list Mexico's goal tally first, score column indicates score after each Huerta goal.

List of international goals scored by César Huerta
No.	Date	Venue	Opponent	Score	Result	Competition
1	9 September 2023	AT&T Stadium, Arlington, United States	Australia	2–2	2–2	Friendly
2	7 September 2024	Rose Bowl, Pasadena, United States	New Zealand	2–0	3–0	Friendly
3	15 October 2024	Estadio Akron, Zapopan, Mexico	United States	2–0	2–0	Friendly

== Honours ==
Mexico U17

- CONCACAF U-17 Championship: 2017

Mexico

- CONCACAF Gold Cup: 2025
- CONCACAF Nations League: 2024–25

Anderlecht

- Belgian Cup runner up: 2024–25, 2025–26

Individual

- Liga MX Player of the Month: September 2023
- Liga MX Best XI: Clausura 2024
- Liga MX All-Star: 2024
