= Gabriel Fernández (footballer, born 1994) =

Uruguayan footballer (born 1994)

Personal information
- Full name: Gabriel Matías Fernández Leites
- Date of birth: 13 May 1994 (age 32)
- Place of birth: Montevideo, Uruguay
- Height: 1.84 m (6 ft 1/2 in)
- Position: Forward

Team information
- Current team: Cruz Azul
- Number: 21

Youth career
- Club Atlético Pablan
- Bella Vista
- Defensor Sporting

Senior career*
| Years | Team | Apps | (Gls) |
| 2013–2014 | Defensor Sporting | 4 | (0) |
| 2013 | → Cerro Largo (loan) | 12 | (2) |
| 2014–2018 | Racing Club | 49 | (15) |
| 2018–2019 | Peñarol | 40 | (17) |
| 2019–2023 | Celta | 20 | (1) |
| 2020–2021 | → Zaragoza (loan) | 30 | (0) |
| 2021–2023 | → Juárez (loan) | 47 | (12) |
| 2023 | Pumas UNAM | 20 | (7) |
| 2024– | Cruz Azul | 77 | (26) |
- * Club domestic league appearances and goals as of 2 November 2026

Gabriel Matías Fernández Leites (born 13 May 1994), commonly known as "Toro Fernández", is an Uruguayan professional footballer who plays as a forward for Liga MX club Cruz Azul.

== Career ==
Fernández had youth stints with Club Atlético Pablan, Bella Vista and Defensor Sporting, featuring for the latter at the 2012 U-20 Copa Libertadores in Peru; where they finished as runners-up to Argentina's River Plate. On 8 January 2013, Fernández completed a loan move to fellow Primera División team Cerro Largo. He made his bow on 23 February against Montevideo Wanderers, which preceded his first goals arriving in March versus Progreso and Racing Club. Fernández returned to his parent club for 2013–14, making four appearances before leaving to join Racing Club. Braces followed in season one over Atenas and Sud América.

After spending three further seasons with Racing Club, participating in forty-nine matches and netting fifteen goals, Fernández switched teams in January 2018 by agreeing to sign for Peñarol. He scored his first goal on 24 February during a win over Liverpool, a club he later notched his first career hat-trick against in the following August on the way to Peñarol's fiftieth league title.

On 26 January 2019, Fernández secured a transfer to La Liga side Celta; effective from the following July, pending the outcome of his court case. The deal was confirmed on 4 July by Celta. His debut arrived in a home defeat to Real Madrid on 17 August. He got his opening goal for them on 24 August, scoring with a backheel flick to earn Celta a 1–0 win over Valencia in La Liga.

On 11 September 2020, Fernández was loaned to Segunda División side Real Zaragoza for the 2020–21 season.

On 3 July 2023, Fernández joined Pumas UNAM for the Apertura 2023 tournament. For a $2M USD transfer fee for Celta.

In December 2023, Pumas UNAM sold Fernández to Cruz Azul making them pay $11,400,000 USD (£9.1M) transfer fee.

== Personal life ==
On 29 December 2018, Fernández was involved in a traffic collision in Montevideo which left Romina Fernández, 18, in a vegetative state, he had allegedly been speeding at 60 km/h in a 45 speed limit zone. After testifying in court in May, the judge prohibited him from leaving the country without permission; with a work-dependent curfew also being set. Celta, who Fernández signed a pre-contract agreement with in the subsequent January, added a clause to the transfer that would see it cancelled if he was found guilty. In June 2019, his passport was returned and a settlement was reached with Romina's family which allowed Fernández to travel to officialise his transfer to Celta.

== Career statistics ==
As of match played on 1 November 2026

Appearances and goals by club, season and competition
| Club | Season | League | | | National cup (Note: Includes Copa del Rey) | | Continental | | Other | | Total | |
| Club | Season | Division | Apps | Goals | Apps | Goals | Apps | Goals | Apps | Goals | Apps | Goals |
|---|---|---|---|---|---|---|---|---|---|---|---|---|
| Defensor Sporting | 2012–13 | Primera División | 0 | 0 | — | | 0 | 0 | 0 | 0 | 0 | 0 |
| Defensor Sporting | 2013–14 | Primera División | 4 | 0 | — | | 0 | 0 | 0 | 0 | 4 | 0 |
| Defensor Sporting | Total | | 4 | 0 | — | | 0 | 0 | 0 | 0 | 4 | 0 |
| Cerro Largo (loan) | 2012–13 | Primera División | 12 | 2 | — | | — | | 0 | 0 | 12 | 2 |
| Racing Club | 2014–15 | Primera División | 14 | 5 | — | | — | | 0 | 0 | 14 | 5 |
| Racing Club | 2015–16 | Primera División | 16 | 0 | — | | — | | 0 | 0 | 16 | 0 |
| Racing Club | 2016 | Primera División | 15 | 8 | — | | — | | 0 | 0 | 15 | 8 |
| Racing Club | 2017 | Primera División | 4 | 2 | — | | — | | 0 | 0 | 4 | 2 |
| Racing Club | Total | | 49 | 15 | — | | — | | 0 | 0 | 49 | 15 |
| Peñarol | 2018 | Primera División | 28 | 12 | — | | 7 (Note: Appearance(s) in the Copa Libertadores and Copa Sudamericana) | 1 | 1 (Note: Appearance(s) in the Primera División play-offs) | 0 | 36 | 13 |
| Peñarol | 2019 | Primera División | 12 | 5 | — | | 5 | 0 | 1 (Note: Appearance(s) in the Supercopa Uruguaya) | 0 | 18 | 5 |
| Peñarol | Total | | 40 | 17 | — | | 11 | 1 | 2 | 0 | 53 | 18 |
| Celta | 2019–20 | La Liga | 20 | 1 | 2 | 0 | — | | 0 | 0 | 22 | 1 |
| Zaragoza (loan) | 2020–21 | Segunda División | 30 | 0 | 2 | 0 | — | | 0 | 0 | 32 | 0 |
| Juárez | 2021–22 | Liga MX | 15 | 4 | — | | — | | — | | 15 | 4 |
| Juárez | 2022–23 | Liga MX | 32 | 8 | — | | — | | — | | 32 | 8 |
| Juárez | Total | | 47 | 12 | — | | — | | — | | 47 | 12 |
| Pumas UNAM | 2023–24 | Liga MX | 20 | 7 | — | | — | | 3 (Note: Appearances in Leagues Cup) | 2 | 23 | 9 |
| Cruz Azul | 2023–24 | Liga MX | 6 | 2 | — | | — | | — | | 6 | 2 |
| Cruz Azul | 2024–25 | Liga MX | 21 | 5 | — | | 8 (Note: Appearances in CONCACAF Champions Cup) | 2 | 0 | 0 | 29 | 7 |
| Cruz Azul | 2025–26 | Liga MX | 36 | 14 | — | | 6 | 1 | 1 (Note: One appearance in FIFA Intercontinental Cup) | 0 | 43 | 15 |
| Cruz Azul | 2026–27 | Liga MX | 14 | 5 | — | | 0 | 0 | 5 (Note: One appearance in Campeón de Campeones, three appearances in Leagues Cup, one appearance in Campeones Cup) | 0 | 19 | 5 |
| Cruz Azul | Total | | 77 | 26 | — | | 14 | 3 | 6 | 0 | 97 | 29 |
| Career total | | | 299 | 80 | 4 | 0 | 25 | 4 | 11 | 2 | 339 | 86 |

== Honours ==
Peñarol

- Primera División: 2018
- Supercopa Uruguaya: 2018

Cruz Azul

- Liga MX: Clausura 2026
- Campeón de Campeones: 2026
- CONCACAF Champions Cup: 2025
