= Gustavo Lema =

Argentine footballer and manager

Personal information
- Full name: Gustavo Alberto Lema
- Date of birth: 1 November 1968 (age 58)
- Place of birth: Buenos Aires, Argentina
- Height: 1.83 m (6 ft 0 in)
- Position: Goalkeeper

Team information
- Current team: Juárez (head coach)

Youth career
- Ferro Carril Oeste
- River Plate

Senior career*
Years	Team	Apps	(Gls)
1991–1992	Douglas Haig	44	(0)
1992–1993	Huracán	2	(0)
1993–1994	Lanús	4	(0)
1994–1995	Almirante Brown	40	(0)
1995–1996	Zacatepec		
1996–1997	All Boys	18	(0)
1997–1998	San Martín Tucumán	44	(0)
1998–2000	Quilmes	54	(0)
2000–2001	Gimnasia de Jujuy	27	(0)
2001	Los Andes	16	(0)
2002–2003	Tristán Suárez	49	(0)
2003	Unión Santa Fe	0	(0)
Total		298	(0)

Managerial career
- 2005–2006: Huracán (assistant)
- 2006–2007: Huracán (assistant)
- 2007–2008: Veracruz (assistant)
- 2008–2010: Colón (assistant)
- 2010–2011: Independiente (assistant)
- 2011–2013: Tijuana (assistant)
- 2013: Huracán (assistant)
- 2014: América (assistant)
- 2015–2018: Monterrey (assistant)
- 2018: Celta Vigo (assistant)
- 2019: Huracán (assistant)
- 2019–2020: Monterrey (assistant)
- 2022: Atlético Mineiro (assistant)
- 2023: UNAM (assistant)
- 2024–2025: UNAM
- 2025–2026: Audax Italiano
- 2026–: Juárez
- * Club domestic league appearances and goals

Gustavo Alberto Lema (born 1 November 1968) is an Argentine football manager and former player who played as a goalkeeper. He is currently the manager of Liga MX club Juárez.

== Playing career ==
Born in Buenos Aires, Lema played for Ferro Carril Oeste and River Plate as a youth, before making his senior debut with Douglas Haig in 1991. He subsequently represented Primera División sides Huracán and Lanús, before resuming his career in Primera B Nacional, playing for Almirante Brown, All Boys, San Martín de Tucumán, Quilmes, Gimnasia Jujuy, Los Andes, Tristán Suárez and Unión Santa Fe.

Lema played abroad in the 1995–96 season, representing Mexican Primera División A side Zacatepec. He retired in 2003, aged 35, due to injuries.

== Managerial career ==
Following his retirement, Lema assumed the role of technical assistant within the staff of Antonio Mohamed. Over the course of 19 years, he fulfilled this role at: Huracán, Veracruz, Colón, Independiente, Tijuana, Club América, Monterrey, Celta de Vigo, Atlético Mineiro and UNAM.

On 12 December 2023, Antonio Mohamed abruptly left UNAM and Lema succeed him as head coach. On 26 February 2025, Lema was relieved of his duties.

On 17 November 2025, Lema was appointed as the manager of Chilean club Audax Italiano. He was removed from his post on 20 June 2026.

On 3 September 2026, he became head coach of FC Juárez.

== Managerial statistics ==
As of match played 20 November 2026

Managerial record by team and tenure
Team	Nat	From	To	Record							
Team	Nat	From	To	G	W	D	L	GF	GA	GD	Win %
Pumas	(Mexico)	12 December 2023	26 February 2025	54	23	13	18	75	70	+5	42.59
Audax Italiano	(Chile)	17 November 2025	20 June 2026	32	13	7	12	46	44	+2	40.63
FC Juárez	(Mexico)	3 September 2026	Present	11	3	3	5	13	18	−5	27.27
Career total				96	38	23	35	134	132	+2	39.58
