= Jesús Rivas (footballer) =

Mexican footballer (born 2002)

Personal information
- Full name: Jesús Andrés Rivas Gutiérrez
- Date of birth: 29 October 2002 (age 24)
- Place of birth: Mexico City, Mexico
- Height: 1.71 m (5 ft 7 in)
- Position: Right-back

Team information
- Current team: Pumas
- Number: 19

Senior career*
Years	Team	Apps	(Gls)
2019–	Pumas	43	(0)
2021	→ Pumas Tabasco (loan)	3	(0)
2025	→ Puebla (loan)	20	(0)

International career^{‡}
2021–	Mexico U21	4	(0)
Medal record
Men's football
Representing Mexico
Toulon Tournament
Third place	2022 France	Team
- * Club domestic league appearances and goals as of 21 October 2026 ‡ National team caps and goals as of 9 June 2022

Jesús Andrés Rivas Gutiérrez (born 29 October 2002) is a Mexican professional footballer who plays as a right-back for Liga MX club Pumas.

== International career ==
In 2022, Rivas was selected by coach Raúl Chabrand to participate in that year's Toulon Tournament with the under-21 squad, where Mexico finished the tournament in third place.

== Career statistics ==
=== Club ===
As of 21 October 2026

Club	Season	League			Cup		Continental		Other		Total	
Club	Season	Division	Apps	Goals	Apps	Goals	Apps	Goals	Apps	Goals	Apps	Goals
Pumas	2019–20	Liga MX	2	0	3	0	—		—		5	0
Pumas	2020–21	Liga MX	9	0	2 (Note: Appearances in Copa GNP por México)	0	—		—		11	0
Pumas	2021–22	Liga MX	1	0	—		1 (Note: Appearance in CONCACAF Champions League)	0	—		2	0
Pumas	2022–23	Liga MX	1	0	1 (Note: Appearance in Copa Sky por México)	0	—		—		2	0
Pumas	2023–24	Liga MX	19	0	—		—		—		18	0
Pumas	2024–25	Liga MX	3	0	—		—		1 (Note: Appearances in Leagues Cup)	0	4	0
Pumas	2025–26	Liga MX	7	0	—		2	0	—		9	0
Pumas	2026–27	Liga MX	1	0	—		—		—		1	0
Pumas	Total		43	0	6	0	3	0	1	0	53	0
Pumas Tabasco (loan)	2020–21	Liga de Expansión MX	3	0	—		—		—		3	0
Puebla (loan)	2024–25	Liga MX	12	0	—		—		—		12	0
Puebla (loan)	2025–26	Liga MX	8	0	—		—		2	0	10	0
Puebla (loan)	Total		20	0	—		—		2	0	22	0
Career total			66	0	6	0	3	0	3	0	78	0
