= Ángel Azuaje =

Mexican footballer (born 2004)

Personal information
- Full name: Ángel Amhed Azuaje García
- Date of birth: 25 September 2004 (age 22)
- Place of birth: Monterrey, Nuevo León, Mexico
- Height: 1.81 m (5 ft 11 in)
- Position: Centre back

Team information
- Current team: Pumas
- Number: 34

Youth career
- 2019–2023: Tijuana
- 2023–2026: Pumas

Senior career*
Years	Team	Apps	(Gls)
2025–	Pumas	28	(1)
- * Club domestic league appearances and goals as of 22 October 2026

Ángel Amhed Azuaje García (born 25 September 2004) is a Mexican professional footballer who plays as a centre-back for Liga MX club Pumas.

== Early life ==
Born in Monterrey, Nuevo León, Azuaje has Venezuelan ancestry through his family.

== Club career ==
=== Early years ===
Azuaje began his youth career at local side Tijuana, before joining the Pumas in 2018. He progressed through the ranks and became a regular for the under-23.

=== Pumas UNAM ===
On 23 February 2025, Azuaje made his senior and professional debut with Pumas, as a substitute, in a 0–2 Liga MX win over America.

== International career ==
On 30 September 2025, it was announced that Azuaje had chosen to represent Venezuela at an international level.

== Career statistics ==
=== Club ===
As of 22 October 2026

Club	Season	League			Cup		Continental		Other		Total		
Club	Season	Division	Apps	Goals	Apps	Goals	Apps	Goals	Apps	Goals	Apps	Goals	
Pumas	2024–25	Liga MX	4	0	—		2 (Note: Appearances in CONCACAF Champions Cup)	0	—		6	0	
Pumas	2025–26	Liga MX	20	0	—		—		1 (Note: Appearances in Leagues Cup)	0	21	0	
Pumas	2026–27	Liga MX	4	1	—		—		2	0	6	1	
Pumas	Career total			28	1	0	0	2	0	3	0	33	1
