= Víctor Arteaga (footballer) =

Mexican footballer (born 2004)

Personal information
- Full name: Víctor Manuel Arteaga Camarena
- Date of birth: 26 February 2004 (age 22)
- Place of birth: Iztapalapa, Mexico
- Height: 1.75 m (5 ft 9 in)
- Position: Midfielder

Team information
- Current team: Pumas UNAM
- Number: 18

Youth career
- 2019: Orizaba
- 2020: UGM
- 2021: CEFOR Cuauhtémoc Blanco
- 2021: Tulum
- 2022–2023: Toluca

Senior career*
Years	Team	Apps	(Gls)
2019	Orizaba	1	(0)
2023–2026	Toluca	30	(0)
2026–	Pumas UNAM	17	(1)
- * Club domestic league appearances and goals as of 21 November 2026

Víctor Manuel Arteaga Camarena (born 26 February 2004) is a Mexican professional footballer who plays as a midfielder for Liga MX club Pumas UNAM.

== Club career ==
=== Early career ===
Arteaga initially began his career at Orizaba, later playing for three other teams before signing with Toluca's reserve team, his best season being with CEFOR Cuauhtémoc Blanco.

=== Toluca ===
After entering Toluca's reserves, Arteaga slowly progressed before making his Liga MX debut on 8 July 2023 in a 2–0 win against Cruz Azul where he was subbed in at the 94th minute.

=== Pumas UNAM ===
On 10 July 2026, Arteaga signed with Pumas UNAM and made his team debut on 18 July in a 0–3 loss to Pachuca where he was subbed in at the 46th minute. One week later, he scored his first goal as a pro against his former team.

== Career statistics ==
=== Club ===
As of match played on 21 November 2026

Club	Season	League			Cup		Continental		Other		Total	
Club	Season	Division	Apps	Goals	Apps	Goals	Apps	Goals	Apps	Goals	Apps	Goals
Orizaba	2019–20	Serie B	1	0	—		—		—		1	0
Toluca	2023–24	Liga MX	6	0	—		2 (Note: Appearances in CONCACAF Champions League)	0	—		8	0
Toluca	2024–25	Liga MX	21	0	—		—		2 (Note: Appearances in Leagues Cup)	0	23	0
Toluca	2025–26	Liga MX	3	0	—		—		—		3	0
Toluca	Total		30	0	—		2	0	2	0	34	0
Pumas UNAM	2026–27	Liga MX	17	1	—		—		3	0	20	1
Career total			48	1	0	0	2	0	5	0	55	1
