= Robert Morales (footballer) =

Paraguayan footballer (born 1999)

Personal information
- Full name: Robert Osmar Morales Benítez
- Date of birth: 17 March 1999 (age 27)
- Place of birth: Concepción, Paraguay
- Height: 1.80 m (5 ft 11 in)
- Position: Striker

Team information
- Current team: Pumas (on loan from Toluca)
- Number: 31

Youth career
- Olimpia

Senior career*
Years	Team	Apps	(Gls)
2017–2019	Olimpia	1	(0)
2019–2023	Cerro Porteño	57	(28)
2023–	Toluca	58	(10)
2026–	→ Pumas (loan)	34	(13)

International career^{‡}
2022–	Paraguay	3	(1)
- * Club domestic league appearances and goals as of 19 September 2026 ‡ National team caps and goals as of 19:12, 27 September 2026 (UTC)

Robert Osmar Morales Benítez (born 17 March 1999), also known as La Pantera, is a Paraguayan professional footballer who plays as a striker for Liga MX club Pumas, on loan from Toluca, and the Paraguay national team.

== Club career ==
=== Youth career ===
Robert Morales was trained in the academy of Olimpia; He was also known for being one of the most efficient scorers in the Paraguayan lower league championships.

== Career statistics ==
=== International ===
As of match played on 27 September 2026

Appearances and goals by national team and year
National team	Year	Apps	Goals
Paraguay	2022	1	1
Paraguay	2023	1	0
Paraguay	2026	1	0
Total		3	1

Scores and results list Paraguay's goal tally first, score column indicates score after each Morales goal.

List of international goals scored by Robert Morales
No.	Date	Venue	Opponent	Score	Result	Competition
1	24 March 2022	Antonio Aranda Stadium, Ciudad del Este, Paraguay	Ecuador	1–0	3–1	Friendly

== Honours ==
Toluca

- Liga MX: Clausura 2025, Apertura 2025
- Campeón de Campeones: 2025
- Campeones Cup: 2025

Individual

- Liga MX Player of the Month: April 2026
- Liga MX All-Star: 2026
