= Álvaro Angulo =

Colombian footballer (born 1997)

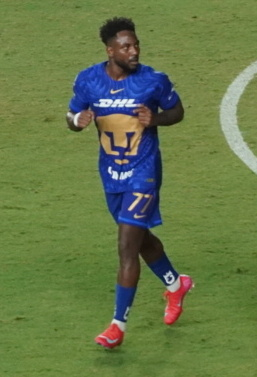
- Angulo with Pumas in 2025

Personal information
- Full name: Álvaro Anyíver Angulo Mosquera
- Date of birth: 6 March 1997 (age 29)
- Place of birth: Tumaco, Colombia
- Height: 1.76 m (5 ft 9 in)
- Position: Left-back

Team information
- Current team: Pumas UNAM
- Number: 77

Senior career*
Years	Team	Apps	(Gls)
2015–2016	Deportivo Pasto	15	(0)
2017–2021	Águilas Doradas	112	(8)
2022–2024	Atlético Nacional	80	(9)
2025	Independiente	17	(4)
2025–	Pumas UNAM	41	(6)

International career^{‡}
2020	Colombia U23	0	(0)
2022–	Colombia	7	(0)
- * Club domestic league appearances and goals as of 25 September 2026 ‡ National team caps and goals as of 6 October 2026

Álvaro Anyíver Angulo Mosquera (born 6 March 1997) is a Colombian professional footballer who plays as a left-back for Liga MX club Pumas UNAM and the Colombia national team.

A former striker who was converted to full-back as a teenager, Angulo began his professional career with Deportivo Pasto in 2015 and spent five seasons with Águilas Doradas before joining Atlético Nacional in 2022. In three seasons at Nacional he made 101 appearances and won two Categoría Primera A titles, the Superliga Colombiana and two editions of the Copa Colombia. He moved abroad in January 2025, joining Argentine club Independiente on a free transfer and reaching the semi-finals of the Torneo Apertura, before being sold to Pumas UNAM that July. In the 2026 Clausura, Pumas finished top of the regular-season table and reached the final.

At youth level, Angulo was part of the Colombia under-23 squad at the 2020 CONMEBOL Pre-Olympic Tournament. He made his senior debut in a 2022 friendly and earned his first competitive cap in 2026 FIFA World Cup qualification in 2025.

== Early life ==
Angulo was born in Tumaco, in the Nariño Department of south-western Colombia. He grew up in the same Tumaco neighbourhood as the former Colombia international Pablo Armero and began playing as a striker in local competitions. Trials with the Sarmiento Lora academy in Cali and with Millonarios and La Equidad in Bogotá were unsuccessful. By 2013 he was working odd jobs alongside his father, including roof repairs, when a representative arranged a trial with Deportivo Pasto's under-17 side; Angulo later described the trial as his last chance to make a career in football.

== Club career ==
=== Deportivo Pasto ===
Angulo made his professional debut for Pasto on 18 February 2015 against Unión Magdalena. He was first used as a wide midfielder before the coach José Fernando Santa, himself a former left-back, persuaded him to move to full-back. He made 25 appearances and scored once in all competitions across two seasons with the club.

=== Águilas Doradas ===
In 2017, Angulo joined Águilas Doradas of Rionegro, where he played under coaches including Néstor Otero and established himself as a first-team full-back. In February 2021, he fractured his right orbital bone in a collision during a league match against La Equidad, shortly after being called up to a Colombia national team training camp. He recovered to make 23 appearances and score four goals in 2021, his final season with the club.

=== Atlético Nacional ===
On 18 January 2022, Atlético Nacional announced Angulo as their fifth signing for the new season, presenting him as "La Pantera Negra" ("The Black Panther"). Angulo had chosen the nickname "La Pantera" with his agent. He was part of the squad that won the 2022 Apertura title. In October 2022, he ruptured the anterior cruciate ligament and medial meniscus of his left knee in a match against his former club Águilas Doradas, requiring surgery and an expected recovery of nine months.

After returning from injury, Angulo was part of the Nacional sides that won the 2023 Copa Colombia and, under Efraín Juárez, the 2024 Copa Colombia and the 2024 Finalización title. On 29 September 2024, he scored 22 seconds into a 6–2 league win over Boyacá Chicó, the fastest goal in Nacional's league history, breaking the record set by Daniel Muñoz in 2019. Seven of his nine league goals for the club came in 2024.

Angulo's contract expired at the end of 2024 and was not renewed. He left having made 101 appearances and scored 11 goals in all competitions for Nacional. He later said that he had wanted to stay but that the club's directors had decided against keeping him, adding that he had lowered his salary demands during negotiations.

=== Independiente ===
On 15 January 2025, Angulo joined Argentine Primera División club Independiente as a free agent, signing a contract until December 2027. He made his debut on 24 January as an 89th-minute substitute for Diego Tarzia against Sarmiento on the opening matchday of the Torneo Apertura. During the league phase he scored against Racing Club, Gimnasia y Esgrima La Plata and Instituto.

On 20 May 2025, Angulo scored the only goal of the Apertura quarter-final away to Boca Juniors at La Bombonera, a left-footed shot in the 63rd minute, having predicted before the match that he would score there. Independiente were eliminated in the semi-finals four days later, losing 6–5 on penalties to Huracán after a goalless draw; Angulo converted his kick in the shoot-out. He scored five goals in 24 appearances in all competitions for the club.

=== Pumas UNAM ===
On 15 July 2025, Angulo joined Liga MX club Pumas UNAM from Independiente. The move reunited him with head coach Efraín Juárez, who had coached him at Nacional. La Nación reported that Pumas paid US$1.5 million for 50 per cent of his economic rights and transferred Ignacio Pussetto to Independiente as part of the deal. After his departure, Angulo publicly criticised Independiente's handling of the sale, disputing the percentage of his rights that had been sold, while the club responded that he had asked to leave during the decisive stage of the season.

Angulo scored in the sixth minute of his Pumas debut on 20 July 2025, against Pachuca. On 2 August, in a 2025 Leagues Cup match against Atlanta United FC at Inter&Co Stadium in Orlando, he opened the scoring from the penalty spot; when goalkeeper Keylor Navas was sent off in stoppage time with Pumas having used all their substitutions, Angulo took over in goal for the remainder of the 3–2 win.

In the 2026 Clausura, Pumas finished first in the regular-season table with 36 points. They reached the final against Cruz Azul, drawing the first leg 0–0 before losing the second leg 2–1 at the Estadio Olímpico Universitario on 24 May 2026; Angulo started the deciding match.

== International career ==
=== Youth ===
In November 2019, Angulo was called up to the Colombia under-23 team by coach Arturo Reyes for a friendly against Japan in Hiroshima. The following month, he was named in the 23-man squad for the 2020 CONMEBOL Pre-Olympic Tournament.

=== Senior ===
Angulo made his senior debut for Colombia on 16 January 2022 in a friendly against Honduras at DRV PNK Stadium in Fort Lauderdale, replacing Miguel Borja in the 68th minute of a 2–1 win.

On 30 August 2025, more than three years after his debut, he was recalled by head coach Néstor Lorenzo as a replacement for the injured Deiver Machado ahead of World Cup qualifiers against Bolivia and Venezuela. He earned his first competitive cap on 9 September, starting at left-back in the qualifier away to Venezuela in Maturín. He also started friendlies against Mexico, a 4–0 win at AT&T Stadium on 11 October, and New Zealand on 15 November.

On 14 May 2026, Angulo was named on Colombia's 55-man preliminary list for the 2026 FIFA World Cup, but was left out of the final 26-man squad announced on 25 May, in which Lorenzo selected Johan Mojica and Machado at left-back. He was recalled in September 2026 for friendlies against Mexico, Paraguay and Peru.

== Career statistics ==
=== Club ===
As of 25 September 2026

Appearances and goals by club, season and competition
Club	Season	League			National cup (Note: Includes Copa Colombia and Copa Argentina)		Continental		Other		Total	
Club	Season	Division	Apps	Goals	Apps	Goals	Apps	Goals	Apps	Goals	Apps	Goals
Deportivo Pasto	2015	Categoría Primera A	4	0	4	0	—		—		8	0
Deportivo Pasto	2016	Categoría Primera A	11	0	6	1	—		—		17	1
Deportivo Pasto	Total		15	0	10	1	—		—		25	1
Águilas Doradas	2017	Categoría Primera A	16	0	1	0	1 (Note: Appearances in the Copa Sudamericana)	0	—		18	0
Águilas Doradas	2018	Categoría Primera A	21	0	1	0	—		—		22	0
Águilas Doradas	2019	Categoría Primera A	30	0	2	0	3	0	—		35	0
Águilas Doradas	2020	Categoría Primera A	19	4	2	0	—		—		21	4
Águilas Doradas	2021	Categoría Primera A	26	4	2	0	—		—		28	4
Águilas Doradas	Total		112	8	8	0	4	0	—		124	8
Atlético Nacional	2022	Categoría Primera A	28	0	4	1	1 (Note: Appearances in the Copa Libertadores)	0	—		33	1
Atlético Nacional	2023	Categoría Primera A	14	2	5	1	3	0	0	0	22	3
Atlético Nacional	2024	Categoría Primera A	38	7	6	0	2	0	—		46	7
Atlético Nacional	Total		80	9	15	2	6	0	0	0	101	11
Independiente	2025	Primera División	17	4	2	1	5	0	—		24	5
Pumas UNAM	2025–26	Liga MX	37	6	—		2 (Note: Appearances in the CONCACAF Champions Cup)	0	3 (Note: Appearances in the Leagues Cup)	1	42	7
Pumas UNAM	2026–27	Liga MX	4	0	—		—		3	1	7	1
Pumas UNAM	Total		41	6	—		2	0	6	2	49	8
Career total			265	27	35	4	17	0	6	2	323	33

=== International ===
As of match played 6 October 2026

Appearances and goals by national team and year
National team	Year	Apps	Goals
Colombia	2022	1	0
Colombia	2023	0	0
Colombia	2024	0	0
Colombia	2025	3	0
Colombia	2026	3	0
Total		7	0

== Honours ==
Atlético Nacional

- Categoría Primera A: 2022 Apertura, 2024 Finalización
- Superliga Colombiana: 2023
- Copa Colombia: 2023, 2024

Pumas UNAM

- Liga MX runner-up: Clausura 2026
