= Rodrigo López (footballer, born 2001) =

Mexican footballer

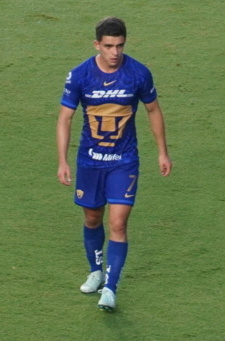
- López with UNAM in 2025

Personal information
- Full name: Rodrigo López Quiñones
- Date of birth: 12 November 2001 (age 25)
- Place of birth: Benito Juárez, Mexico City, Mexico
- Height: 1.73 m (5 ft 8 in)
- Position: Midfielder

Team information
- Current team: UNAM
- Number: 7

Youth career
- 2013–2017: UNAM
- 2017–2018: BUAP
- 2019–2022: Querétaro

Senior career*
Years	Team	Apps	(Gls)
2022–2023	Querétaro	31	(2)
2023–	UNAM	104	(5)

International career^{‡}
2023–	Mexico U23	5	(1)
2023–	Mexico	2	(0)
Medal record
Men's football
Representing Mexico
Central American and Caribbean Games
Gold medal – first place	2023 San Salvador	Team
- * Club domestic league appearances and goals as of 21 November 2026 ‡ National team caps and goals as of 31 May 2024

Rodrigo López Quiñones (born 12 November 2001) is a Mexican professional footballer who plays as a midfielder for Liga MX club UNAM.

== International career ==
López made his debut with the senior national team on 16 December 2023, in a friendly against Colombia.

== Career statistics ==
=== Club ===
As of match played on 21 November 2026

Club	Season	League			Cup		Continental		Other		Total	
Club	Season	Division	Apps	Goals	Apps	Goals	Apps	Goals	Apps	Goals	Apps	Goals
Querétaro	2022–23	Liga MX	28	2	—		—		—		28	2
Querétaro	2023–24	Liga MX	3	0	—		—		4 (Note: Appearances in Leagues Cup)	0	7	0
Querétaro	Total		31	2	—		—		4	0	35	2
Pumas	2023–24	Liga MX	25	1	—		—		—		25	1
Pumas	2024–25	Liga MX	24	2	—		3 (Note: Appearances in CONCACAF Champions Cup)	0	1	0	28	2
Pumas	2025–26	Liga MX	38	1	—		1	0	3	0	42	1
Pumas	2026–27	Liga MX	17	1	—		—		3	0	20	1
Pumas	Total		104	5	—		4	0	7	0	115	5
Career total			135	7	0	0	4	0	11	0	150	7

=== International ===
As of match played on 31 May 2024

National team	Year	Apps	Goals
Mexico	2023	1	0
Mexico	2024	1	0
Total		2	0

== Honours ==
Mexico U23

- Central American and Caribbean Games: 2023
