= Pablo Lara (footballer) =

Mexican footballer (born 2005)

Personal information
- Full name: Pablo Emiliano Lara Nevárez
- Date of birth: 29 June 2005 (age 21)
- Place of birth: Tijuana, Baja California, Mexico
- Height: 1.84 m (6 ft 0 in)
- Position: Goalkeeper

Team information
- Current team: Pumas
- Number: 35

Youth career
- 2019–2025: Pumas

Senior career*
Years	Team	Apps	(Gls)
2024–	Pumas	8	(0)

International career^{‡}
2022	Mexico U18	1	(0)
2023	Mexico U19	4	(0)
2024–	Mexico U20	6	(0)
Medal record
Men's football
Representing Mexico
CONCACAF U-20 Championship
Winner	2024 Mexico
- * Club domestic league appearances and goals as of 21 April 2026 ‡ National team caps and goals as of 12 October 2025

Pablo Emiliano Lara Nevárez (born 29 June 2005) is a Mexican professional footballer who plays as a goalkeeper for Liga MX club Pumas.

== Club career ==
=== Pumas ===
Lara began his career at the academy of Pumas in 2019, starting with the team's U15 squad, making a name for himself and progressing through all categories, getting his first title in the U23 Liga MX Apertura 2018, beating Monterrey 1–0 in the final. This propelling him to the U23 team.

On 12 January 2025, Lara made his debut with Pumas's first team, in a 2–1 win against Necaxa, with him stopping seven shots.

== Career statistics ==
=== Club ===
As of 22 October 2026

Appearances and goals by club, season and competition
Club	Season	League			Cup		Continental		Other		Total		
Club	Season	Division	Apps	Goals	Apps	Goals	Apps	Goals	Apps	Goals	Apps	Goals	
Pumas	2024–25	Liga MX	7	0	—		—		—		7	0	
Pumas	2025–26	Liga MX	1	0	—		—		—		1	0	
Pumas	Career total	Liga MX		8	0	0	0	0	0	0	0	8	0

== International career ==
After a string of good performances with Pumas's U18 squad, Andrés Lillini called Lara up to the Mexico U20, making his debut on 27 July 2024 in a 1–1 draw with the Panama U20 team in the 2024 CONCACAF U-20 Championship, which Mexico ended up winning.

In 2025, Lara was called up by coach Eduardo Arce to represent Mexico at the FIFA U-20 World Cup held in Chile.

== Honours ==
Mexico

- CONCACAF U-20 Championship: 2024

Individual

- IFFHS Men's Youth (U20) CONCACAF Best XI: 2025
