= 2018–19 Club América season =

Club América
2018–19 season
- President: Santiago Baños
- Manager: Miguel Herrera
- Stadium: Estadio Azteca
- Apertura 2018: 2nd Winners
- Clausura 2019: 5th Semi-finals
- Copa MX (Apertura): Round of 16
- Copa MX (Clausura): Winners
- Top goalscorer: League: Apertura: Bruno Valdez (7 goals); Clausura: Roger Martínez (10 goals); All: Henry Martín; Roger Martínez (14 goals)
Home colours	Away colours	Third colours

The 2018–19 season was Club América's 6th consecutive season in the Liga MX, and 74th consecutive season in the top-flight of Mexican football. The club participated in the Liga MX and the Copa MX.

== Pre-season and friendlies ==
Club América will precede their 2018–19 campaign with a series of friendlies to be contested in the United States. The matches were announced in May 2018.

Date	Opponents	Stadium	Result F–A	Scorers
30 June 2018	Santos Laguna	Cotton Bowl Stadium	3–0	Jérémy Ménez, Henry Martín, Cecilio Domínguez
4 July 2018	Pachuca	HEB Park	3–2	Cecilio Domínguez (2), Fernando González
8 July 2018	Morelia	Avaya Stadium	2–1	Roger Martínez (2)
11 July 2018	Atlas	Chukchansi Park	0–0	
19 July 2018	Manchester United	University of Phoenix Stadium	1–1	Henry Martín

== Squad ==
=== 2018 Apertura squad ===
Note: Flags indicate national team as defined under FIFA eligibility rules; some limited exceptions apply. Players may hold more than one non-FIFA nationality.

No.	Pos.	Nation	Player
1	GK	ARG	Agustín Marchesín
2	DF	MEX	Carlos Vargas
3	DF	MEX	Jorge Sánchez
4	DF	MEX	Edson Álvarez
5	MF	ARG	Guido Rodríguez
7	FW	FRA	Jérémy Ménez
8	MF	COL	Mateus Uribe
9	FW	COL	Roger Martínez
10	MF	PAR	Cecilio Domínguez
11	FW	COL	Andrés Ibargüen
12	DF	MEX	Luis Reyes
14	MF	USA	Joe Corona (on loan from Tijuana)
15	MF	MEX	Pedro Arce
17	FW	ARG	Cristian Insaurralde (on loan from O'Higgins)
18	DF	PAR	Bruno Valdez
19	DF	ARG	Emanuel Aguilera

No.	Pos.	Nation	Player
20	FW	MEX	Diego Lainez
21	FW	MEX	Henry Martín
22	DF	MEX	Paul Aguilar (vice-captain)
23	MF	MEX	Antonio López
24	FW	MEX	Oribe Peralta (captain)
25	MF	MEX	Iván Moreno
26	DF	MEX	Ulises Torres
27	GK	MEX	Óscar Jiménez
28	DF	MEX	Oswaldo León
29	MF	MEX	Brandon García
30	MF	ECU	Renato Ibarra
31	FW	MEX	Francisco González
32	MF	MEX	Víctor Rodríguez
33	MF	MEX	Isaác Aguilar
34	DF	MEX	Daniel Zamora
35	GK	MEX	César Estrada

=== 2019 Clausura squad ===
Note: Flags indicate national team as defined under FIFA eligibility rules; some limited exceptions apply. Players may hold more than one non-FIFA nationality.

No.	Pos.	Nation	Player
1	GK	ARG	Agustín Marchesín
2	DF	MEX	Carlos Vargas
3	DF	MEX	Jorge Sánchez
4	DF	MEX	Edson Álvarez
5	MF	ARG	Guido Rodríguez
7	FW	FRA	Jérémy Ménez
8	MF	COL	Mateus Uribe
9	FW	COL	Roger Martínez
11	FW	COL	Andrés Ibargüen
12	DF	MEX	Luis Reyes
14	MF	COL	Nicolás Benedetti
15	FW	CHI	Nicolás Castillo
18	DF	PAR	Bruno Valdez
19	DF	ARG	Emanuel Aguilera
21	FW	MEX	Henry Martín

No.	Pos.	Nation	Player
22	DF	MEX	Paul Aguilar (vice-captain)
23	MF	MEX	Antonio López
24	FW	MEX	Oribe Peralta (captain)
25	MF	MEX	Iván Moreno
26	MF	MEX	Sebastián Córdova
27	GK	MEX	Óscar Jiménez
28	DF	MEX	Oswaldo León
29	MF	MEX	Brandon García
30	MF	ECU	Renato Ibarra
31	FW	MEX	Fernando González
32	MF	MEX	Víctor Rodríguez
33	MF	MEX	Isaác Aguilar
34	DF	MEX	Daniel Zamora
35	GK	MEX	César Estrada

Sources: Club América

== Transfers ==
=== Summer ===
==== In ====
Pos.	Player	Age	From	Fee	Notes	Source
DF	(Mexico) Luis Reyes	27	(Mexico) Atlas	Undisclosed		
DF	(Mexico) Jorge Sánchez	20	(Mexico) Santos Laguna	Undisclosed		
FW	(Colombia) Roger Martínez	24	(Spain) Villarreal	€9,000,000		
MF	(Argentina) Cristian Insaurralde	27	(Chile) O'Higgins	loan		

=== Winter ===
==== In ====
Pos.	Player	Age	From	Fee	Notes	Source
MF	(Mexico) Sebastián Córdova	21	(Mexico) Necaxa	Loan return		
MF	(Colombia) Nicolás Benedetti	21	(Colombia) Deportivo Cali	Undisclosed		
FW	(Chile) Nicolás Castillo	25	(Portugal) Benfica	€9,000,000		

==== Out ====
Pos.	Player	Age	To	Fee	Notes	Source
MF	(United States) Joe Corona	28	(Mexico) Tijuana	Loan terminated		
FW	(Mexico) Diego Lainez	18	(Spain) Real Betis	€14,600,000		
FW	(Paraguay) Cecilio Domínguez	24	(Argentina) Independiente	€5,400,000		
MF	(Argentina) Cristian Insaurralde	27	(Chile) O'Higgins	Loan terminated		

== Competitions ==
=== Overview ===
Competition	First match	Last match	Starting round	Final position	Record							
Competition	First match	Last match	Starting round	Final position	Pld	W	D	L	GF	GA	GD	Win %
Apertura 2018	22 July 2018	16 December 2018	Matchday 1	Winners	23	12	9	2	47	23	+24	52.17
Clausura 2019	11 January 2019	19 May 2019	Matchday 1	Semi-finals	21	11	2	8	32	22	+10	52.38
Copa MX (Apertura)	31 July 2018	25 September 2018	Group 7	Round of 16	5	3	2	0	11	3	+8	60.00
Copa MX (Clausura)	15 January 2019	10 April 2019	Group 4	Winners	8	7	0	1	18	6	+12	87.50
Total					57	33	13	11	108	54	+54	57.89

Last updated: 19 May 2019
Source: Competitions

=== Torneo Apertura ===
==== League table ====
Pos	Team	Pld	W	D	L	GF	GA	GD	Pts	Qualification or relegation
1	Cruz Azul	17	11	3	3	26	13	+13	36	Advance to Liguilla (Note: The first 8 places in the table qualified for the Liguilla. The last ranked team in the relegation table could qualify for the Liguilla in the Apertura tournament.)
2	América (C)	17	9	6	2	33	17	+16	33	Advance to Liguilla
3	Pumas	17	8	6	3	29	19	+10	30	Advance to Liguilla
4	Santos Laguna	17	8	6	3	27	18	+9	30	Advance to Liguilla
5	Monterrey	17	9	3	5	25	19	+6	30	Advance to Liguilla

Source: Liga MX
Rules for classification: 1) Points; 2) Goal difference; 3) Number of goals scored; 4) Head-to-head results between tied teams; 5) Number of goals scored away; 6) Highest relegation coefficient; 7) Fair Play points
(C) Champions

==== Apertura Matches ====
22 July 2018 1	Necaxa	2–1	América	Aguascalientes
20:00	Dávila 34'; Fernández 74'	Report	Martínez 71'	Stadium: Estadio Victoria; Attendance: 16,450; Referee: Jorge Isaac Rojas

28 July 2018 2	América	3–0	Atlas	Mexico City
19:00	Rodríguez 33', 53'; Uribe 39'	Report		Stadium: Azteca; Attendance: 25,578; Referee: Adonai Escobedo

4 August 2018 3	Pachuca	1–3	América	Pachuca
19:00	Murillo (yellow card) 35'; Martínez (yellow card) 56'; Jara 89'	Report	Lainez 15', 61'; Corona (yellow card) 41'; Peralta 79'; Marchesín (yellow card) 90+1'	Stadium: Estadio Hidalgo; Referee: Fernando Hernandez Gomez

11 August 2018 4	América	3–0	Monterrey	Mexico City
21:00	Martínez 23'; Valdez 49'; Ibargüen 84'	Report		Stadium: Estadio Azteca; Attendance: 24,346; Referee: Jorge Antonio Pérez Durán

18 August 2018 5	Querétaro	1–1	América	Querétaro
21:00 CDT	Puch (yellow card) 37' da Silva 74'	Report	Peralta 36'; Uribe (yellow card) 37'	Stadium: Estadio Corregidora; Referee: Jorge Isaac Rojas Castillo

22 August 2018 6	León	2–0	América	León
19:00 CST	Boselli 10', 64'; Cerato (yellow card) 22'; Meneses (yellow card) 77'; Navarro (yellow card) 90'	Report	Álvarez (yellow card) 31'; Rodríguez (yellow card) 55'; Marchesín (yellow card) 63'; Sánchez (yellow card) 72'	Stadium: Estadio León; Referee: Marco Antonio Ortiz Nava

25 August 2018 7	América	2–2	Pumas	Mexico City
19:00 CST	Peralta 32'; Martín 90+2'	Report	Mora 1'; González 72'	Stadium: Estadio Azteca; Attendance: 38,342; Referee: Fernando Guerrero

2 September 2018 8	Lobos BUAP	0–2	América	Puebla
16:00 CDT	Tejeda (yellow card) 40'; Rodríguez (yellow card) 90+3'	Report	Peralta 29'; Álvarez (yellow card) 56'; Aguilera (yellow card) 73'; Uribe 90+5'	Stadium: Estadio Universitario BUAP; Referee: Oscar Macías Romo

15 September 2018 9	América	2–1	Morelia	Mexico City
19:00 CST	Peralta (yellow card) 5'; Sánchez 28'; Uribe 53'; Lainez (yellow card) 71'	Report	Loeschbor (yellow card) 15'; Guzmán (yellow card) 30'; Vegas 82', (red card) 90+1'; Valdés (yellow card) 90'; Sosa (yellow card) 90+1'; Millar (red card) 90+2'	Stadium: Estadio Azteca; Referee: Eduardo Galvan Basulto

21 September 2018 10	Puebla	2–3	América	Puebla City
21:00	Cavallini 42'; Arreola 59'	Report	Domínguez 8'; Peralta 44'; Valdez 90+4'	Stadium: Estadio Cuauhtémoc; Attendance: 22,234; Referee: Luis Enrique Santander

30 September 2018 11	América	1–1	Guadalajara	Mexico City
18:00	Ibargüen 80'; Rodríguez (yellow card) 90+5'	Report	Pulido 58'; Hernández (yellow card) 90+3'; Gudiño (yellow card) 90+4'	Stadium: Azteca; Referee: César Arturo Ramos Palazuelos

6 October 2018 12	Tigres	2–3	América	San Nicolás
19:00	Rodríguez 32'; Gignac 57'	Report	Valdez 8'; Aguilera 46'; Rodríguez 56'	Stadium: Universitario; Attendance: 41,596; Referee: Marco Antonio Ortiz Nava

20 October 2018 13	América	3–0	Tijuana	Mexico City
19:00	Aguilera 6'; Ibargüen 45'; Lainez 58'	Report	Canto (yellow card) 20'; González (yellow card) 68'	Stadium: Azteca; Referee: Diego Montaño Robles

27 October 2018 14	Cruz Azul	0–0	América	Mexico City
21:00 CDT	Marcone (yellow card) 24'; Salas (yellow card) 76'	Referee Report		Stadium: Estadio Azteca; Attendance: 62,003; Referee: Jorge Antonio Pérez Durán

3 November 2018 15	América	1–1	Toluca	Mexico City
19:00	Martín 34'	Report	Vega 1'	Stadium: Azteca; Attendance: 29,635; Referee: Oscar Macías Romero

11 November 2018 16	Santos	1–1	América	Torreón
19:00	José Abella (yellow card) 14' (yellow-red card) 90'; Furch 16'	Report	Luis Reyes (yellow card) 39'; Bruno Valdez 61'	Stadium: Corona; Referee: Luis Enrique Santander Aguirre

24 November 2018 17	América	4–1	Veracruz	Mexico City
19:00	Martínez 1'; Rodríguez 7'; Aguilera 26'; Ibarra 68'	Report	Carrasco 15', (yellow card) 89'; Caicedo (yellow card) 24'; Paganoni (yellow card) 45'; Noya (yellow card) 49'	Stadium: Azteca; Referee: Diego Montaño Robles

===== Liguilla =====
====== Quarter-finals ======
29 November 2018 First leg	Toluca	2–2	América	Toluca
19:00	Tobio 23'; Vega 90+5'	Report	Aguilera 6'; Valdez 25'	Stadium: Nemesio Díez; Attendance: 26,031; Referee: Marco Antonio Ortiz Nava

2 December 2018 Second leg	América	3–2 (5–4 agg.)	Toluca	Mexico City
18:30	Martínez 3'; Valdez 23'; Aguilar 55'	Report	Sambueza 67' da Silva 86'	Stadium: Estadio Azteca; Attendance: 44,118; Referee: César Arturo Ramos

===== Semi-finals =====
6 December 2018 First leg	Pumas	1–1	América	Mexico City
20:45 CST	Rodríguez 50'; Cabrera (yellow card) 60'; Quintana (yellow card) 73'	Report	Lainez 21'; Peralta (yellow card) 57'	Stadium: Estadio Olímpico Universitario; Attendance: 49,345; Referee: Luis Enrique Santander

9 December 2018 Second leg	América	6–1 (7–2 agg.)	Pumas	Mexico City
18:45 CST	Ibarra 7'; Valdez 28'; Martínez 35'; Rodríguez 46'; Lainez 50'; Aguilera 71'	Report	González 23'	Stadium: Estadio Azteca; Attendance: 64,039; Referee: Jorge Isaac Rojas

====== Final ======
13 December 2018 First leg	América	0–0	Cruz Azul	Mexico City
20:30 CST	Ibarra (yellow card) 41'; Aguilar (yellow card) 90+2'; Aguilera (yellow card) 90+6'	Report; Referee Report	Caraglio (yellow card) 17'; Méndez (yellow card) 87'; Marcone (yellow card) 90+2'	Stadium: Estadio Azteca; Attendance: 79,244; Referee: Fernando Guerrero Ramírez

16 December 2018 Second leg	Cruz Azul	0–2 (0–2 agg.)	América	Mexico City
18:30 CST	Cauteruccio (yellow card) 15'; Alvarado (yellow card) 81'; Flores (red card) 86'	Report	Aguilera (yellow card) 39'; Sánchez (yellow card) 45+1'; Peralta (yellow card) 63'; Álvarez 50', 89'; Ibargüen (yellow card) 85'	Stadium: Estadio Azteca; Attendance: 71,240; Referee: César Arturo Ramos

=== Torneo Clausura ===
==== League table ====
Pos	Team	Pld	W	D	L	GF	GA	GD	Pts	Qualification or relegation
3	Monterrey	17	8	6	3	33	21	+12	30	Advance to Liguilla (Note: The first 8 places in the table qualified for the Liguilla.)
4	Cruz Azul	17	8	6	3	26	15	+11	30	Advance to Liguilla
5	América	17	9	2	6	28	19	+9	29	Advance to Liguilla
6	Necaxa	17	8	5	4	32	24	+8	29	Advance to Liguilla
7	Pachuca	17	8	4	5	32	26	+6	28	Advance to Liguilla

Source: Liga MX
Rules for classification: 1) Points; 2) Goal difference; 3) Number of goals scored; 4) Head-to-head results between tied teams; 5) Number of goals scored away; 6) Highest relegation coefficient; 7) Fair Play points

==== Clausura Matches ====
11 January 2019 2	Atlas	1–2	América	Guadalajara
21:00	Martín 56'; Domínguez 68'	Report	Martínez 89'	Stadium: Estadio Jalisco; Attendance: 46,056; Referee: Jorge Antonio Pérez Durán

19 January 2019 3	América	3–0	Pachuca	Mexico City
20:50	Rodríguez 15'; Valdez (yellow card) 28'; Martín 46'; Insaurralde 50', (yellow card) 56'	Report	López (yellow card) 13'; Cardona (yellow card) 90+2'	Stadium: Estadio Azteca; Referee: Oscar Macías Romo

26 January 2019 4	Monterrey	3–2	América	Guadalupe
17:00	Sánchez 13'; Funes Mori 66', 69'	Report	Álvarez 24'; Valdez 80'	Stadium: Estadio BBVA Bancomer; Attendance: 46,292; Referee: Fernando Guerrero Ramírez

2 February 2019 5	América	2–0	Querétaro	Mexico City
17:00	Ibarra 12'; Martínez 87'; Valdez (yellow card) 90'	Report	del Valle (yellow card) 86'	Stadium: Estadio Azteca; Referee: Jorge Isaac Rojas Castillo

9 February 2019 6	América	0–3	León	Mexico City
19:00 CST	Aguilar (yellow card) 68'	Report	Macías 11'; Navarro (yellow card) 48'; Mena 72', 79'	Stadium: Olímpico Universitario; Referee: Oscar Mejia Garcia

17 February 2019 7	Pumas	1–0	América	Mexico City
12:00	Mozo (yellow card) 23'; González 47'; Malcorra (yellow card) 70'; Saldívar (yellow card) 83'; Domínguez (yellow card) 88'	Report	Aguilar (yellow card) 2'; Marchesín (yellow card) 69'	Stadium: Olímpico Universitario; Referee: César Arturo Ramos Palazuelos

23 February 2019 8	América	3–0	Lobos BUAP	Mexico City
19:00 CST	Martín 32'; Aguilar (yellow card) 38'; Aguilera (yellow card) 62'; Castillo 82', 88'	Report		Stadium: Olímpico Universitario; Referee: Diego Montaño Robles

1 Mar 2019 9	Morelia	2–2	América	Morelia
19:00	Flores 6'; Osuna (yellow card) 34'; Sansores (yellow card) 45'; Millar (yellow card) 50'; Lezcano (yellow card) 69'; Vilchis 72', (yellow card) 89'	Report	Valdez (yellow card) 21' (yellow-red card) 59'; Castillo (yellow card) 50', (goal) 75'; Marchesin (yellow card) 63'; P. Aguilar (yellow card) 87'; Córdova 90+1'	Stadium: Morelos; Referee: Fernando Hernandez Gomez

5 March 2019 1	América	1–3	Necaxa	Mexico City
20:50	Martín 4'; Rodríguez (yellow card) 31'; Aguilar (yellow card) 54'; Ménez (yellow card) 74'; Castillo (yellow card) 87'	Report	González (yellow card) 12'; Calderón 53', 90+5'; Fernández 64', (yellow card) 64'; Ruíz (yellow card) 87'; González (yellow card) 88'	Stadium: Estadio Azteca; Attendance: 14,241; Referee: Marco Antonio Ortiz Nava
Note: Match originally scheduled for 21:45 on 7 January 2019

9 March 2019 10	América	1–0	Puebla	Mexico City
19:00	Castillo (yellow card) 31'; Córdova 86'	Report	Chumacero (yellow card) 12'; Acosta (yellow card) 44' (yellow-red card) 47'; Loroña (yellow card) 69'; Guerrero (yellow card) 90'	Stadium: Estadio Azteca; Referee: Adonai Escobedo Gonzalez

16 March 2019 11	Guadalajara	0–2	América	Zapopan
19:00	Vega (yellow card) 11'; Molina (red card) 36'; Ponce (yellow card) 75'	Report	Castillo 2'; P. Aguilar (yellow card) 27'; Aguilera (yellow card) 29'; Ibargüen 49'	Stadium: Estadio Akron; Referee: Jorge Isaac Rojas Castillo

30 March 2019 12	América	3–0	Tigres	Mexico City
19:00	Valdez 5'; Aguilera 68'; Benedetti 88'	Report		Stadium: Estadio Azteca; Referee: Jorge Antonio Pérez Durán

6 April 2019 13	Tijuana	3–2	América	Tijuana
20:06	Castillo (yellow card) 14'; Bolaños 32', (yellow card) 90'; Bou 71'; Nahuelpán 76'; Mendoza (yellow card) 90+9'	Report	G. Rodríguez 14', 40'; P. Aguilar (yellow card) 20'; Álvarez (yellow card) 34'; Vargas (yellow card) 69'; A. Lopez (yellow card) 86'; Rodríguez (yellow card) 90+7'	Stadium: Caliente; Referee: Fernando Hernandez Gomez

14 April 2019 14	América	0–0	Cruz Azul	Mexico City
18:30 CDT	Marchesin (yellow card) 13'	Report	Caraglio (yellow card) 12'	Stadium: Estadio Azteca; Referee: Marco Antonio Ortiz Nava

21 April 2019 15	Toluca	3–2	América	Toluca
12:00	Mancuello 4'; Maidana (yellow card) 46'; Pardo (yellow card) 53'; Canelo 71', 82'; Gigliotti (yellow card) 77'; Salinas (yellow card) 90+8'	Report	Martínez 35', (yellow card) 79'; Maidana 66' (o.g.)	Stadium: Estadio Nemesio Díez; Referee: Luis Enrique Santander Aguirre

27 April 2019 16	América	1–0	Santos	Mexico City
19:00 CDT	Aguilera 14'; P. Aguilar (yellow card) 78' (yellow-red card) 78'; Álvarez (yellow card) 88'	Report	Abella (red card) 71'; Dória (yellow card) 90'	Stadium: Estadio Azteca; Referee: Jorge Isaac Rojas Castillo

3 May 2019 17	Veracruz	0–2	América	Veracruz
19:00 CST	Bonilha (yellow card) 13'; Paganoni (yellow card) 75'; Prieto (yellow card) 87'	Report	Martínez 2', (yellow card) 67'; Vargas (yellow card) 16'; Castillo 74'; Ibarra (yellow card) 87'	Stadium: Estadio Luis "Pirata" Fuente; Referee: Eduardo Galvan Basulto

===== Quarter-finals =====
9 May 2019 First leg	América	3–1	Cruz Azul	Mexico City
21:05 CDT	Sánchez (yellow card) 13'; Lichnovsky 21' (o.g.); Martínez 44', 73'	Report	Caraglio 14', (yellow card) 90+3'; Lichnovsky (yellow card) 56'; Méndez (yellow card) 68'; Aguilar (yellow card) 85'	Stadium: Estadio Azteca; Referee: Jorge Isaac Rojas Castillo

12 May 2019 Second leg	Cruz Azul	1–0 (2–3 agg.)	América	Mexico City
18:10 CDT	Lichnovsky (yellow card) 10'; J. Rodríguez 48'; Cauteruccio (yellow card) 90'; Caraglio (yellow card) 90+2'	Report	Sánchez (yellow card) 60'; Ibarra (yellow card) 90+2'; Peralta (yellow card) 90+3'	Stadium: Estadio Azteca; Referee: Fernando Guerrero Ramírez

===== Semi-finals =====
16 May 2019 First leg	América	0–1	León	Mexico City
20:30 CDT			Macías 69'	Stadium: Estadio Azteca

19 May 2019 Second leg	León	0–1 (1–1 agg.)	América	León
20:00 CDT			Valdéz 5'	Stadium: Estadio León

=== Copa MX Clausura 2019 ===
15 January 2019 Group Stage	Necaxa	1–2	América	Aguascalientes
19:00 CDT				Stadium: Estadio Victoria

23 January 2019 Group Stage	América	1–0	San Luis	México City
21:00 CDT				Stadium: Estadio Azteca

30 January 2019 Group Stage	San Luis	2–0	América	San Luis Potosí
21:00 CDT				Stadium: Estadio Alfonso Lastras

5 February 2019 Group Stage	América	3–1	Necaxa	México City
21:00 CDT				Stadium: Estadio Azteca

==== Round of 16 ====
26 February 2019	América	5–2	Pachuca	México City
21:00 CDT				Stadium: Estadio Azteca

==== Quarter-finals ====
13 March 2019	América	2–0	Guadalajara	México City
21:00 CDT				Stadium: Estadio Azteca

==== Semi-finals ====
2 April 2019	América	4–0	Tijuana	México City
20:00 CDT				Stadium: Estadio Azteca

==== Final ====
10 April 2019	Juárez	0–1	América	Ciudad Juárez
21:00 CDT				Stadium: Estadio Azteca
