= Apertura 2018 Liga MX final phase =

Apertura 2018 Final phase
Tournament details
- Country: Mexico
- Dates: 28 November–16 December 2017
- Teams: 8

Final positions
- Champions: América (13th title)
- Runners-up: Cruz Azul

Tournament statistics
- Matches played: 14
- Goals scored: 36 (2.57 per match)
- Attendance: 577,066 (41,219 per match)

The Apertura 2018 Liga MX championship stage commonly known as Liguilla (mini league) was played from 28 November 2018 to 16 December 2018. A total of eight teams competed in the championship stage to decide the champions of the Apertura 2018 Liga MX season. Both finalists qualified to the 2020 CONCACAF Champions League.

== Qualified teams ==
The following 8 teams qualified for the championship stage.

In the following table, the number of appearances, last appearance, and previous best result count only those in the short tournament era starting from Invierno 1996 (not counting those in the long tournament era from 1943–44 to 1995–96).

Team	Seed	Points	Appearance	Last appearance	Previous best	Ref.
Cruz Azul	1	36	28th	Apertura 2017	Champions (Invierno 1997)	
América	2	33	31st	Clausura 2018	Champions (4 times)	
Pumas	3	30 (+10)	22nd	Clausura 2018	Champions (4 times)	
Santos Laguna	4	30 (+9)	29th	Clausura 2018	Champions (6 times)	
Monterrey	5	30 (+6)	21st	Clausura 2018	Champions (3 times)	
UANL	6	29	23rd	Clausura 2018	Champions (4 times)	
Toluca	7	26 (+5)	32nd	Clausura 2018	Champions (7 times)	
Querétaro	8	26 (–1)	10th (Note: Includes the appearances of the original Jaguares de Chiapas franchise (2002–2013), which is how the franchise was previously known as.)	Clausura 2015	Runners-up (Clausura 2015)	

== Format ==
- Teams were re-seeded each round.
- Team with more goals on aggregate after two matches advanced.
- Away goals rule was applied in the quarter-finals and semi-finals, but not the final.
- In the quarter-finals and semi-finals, if the two teams were tied on aggregate and away goals, the higher seeded team advanced.
- In the final, if the two teams were tied after both legs, the match went to extra time and, if necessary, a shoot-out.
- Both finalists qualified to the 2020 CONCACAF Champions League.

== Bracket ==
Quarter-finals
1	Cruz Azul	2	1	3
8	Querétaro	0	1	1
4	Santos Laguna	0	0	0
5	Monterrey	1	2	3
2	América	2	3	5
7	Toluca	2	2	4
3	UNAM	1	3	4
6	UANL	2	1	3

Semi-finals
1	Cruz Azul (s)	0	1	1
5	Monterrey	1	0	1
2	América	1	6	7
3	Pumas	1	1	2

Finals
1	Cruz Azul	0	0	0
2	América	0	2	2

== Quarter-finals ==
Team 1	Agg.	Team 2	1st leg	2nd leg
Querétaro	1–3	Cruz Azul	0–2	1–1
Toluca	4–5	América	2–2	2–3
UANL	3–4	Pumas	2–1	1–3
Monterrey	3–0	Santos Laguna	1–0	2–0

All times are UTC−5

=== First leg ===
28 November 2018
19:00

Querétaro	0–2	Cruz Azul
	Report	Aguilar 16'; Méndez 60'

Estadio Corregidora, Querétaro City
Attendance: 29,039
Referee: Diego Montaño Robles (Jalisco)

28 November 2018
21:06

Monterrey	1–0	Santos Laguna
Funes Mori 60'	Report

Estadio BBVA Bancomer, Guadalupe
Attendance: 24,723
Referee: Luis Enrique Santander (Guanajuato)

29 November 2018
19:00

Toluca	2–2	América
Tobio 24'; Vega 90+6'	Report	Aguilera 7'; Valdez 26'

Estadio Nemesio Díez, Toluca
Attendance: 26,031
Referee: Marco Antonio Ortiz (Durango)

29 November 2018
21:00

UANL	2–1	Pumas
Aquino 68'; Dueñas 81'	Report	Mora 9'

Estadio Universitario, San Nicolás de los Garza
Attendance: 41,301
Referee: Oscar Macías Romo (Aguascalientes)

=== Second leg ===
1 December 2018
19:00

Cruz Azul	1–1	Querétaro
Hernández 4'	Report	Romo 61'

Estadio Azteca, Mexico City
Attendance: 30,858
Referee: Jorge Antonio Pérez (Veracruz)

Cruz Azul won 3–1 on aggregate.

1 December 2018
21:00

Santos Laguna	0–2	Monterrey
	Report	Sánchez 53'; Funes Mori 59'

Estadio Corona, Torreón
Attendance: 25,900
Referee: Jorge Isaac Rojas (Mexico City)

Monterrey won 3–0 on aggregate.

2 December 2018
12:00

Pumas	3–1	UANL
C. González 52'; Mora 59'; Alustiza 90+2'	Report	Saldívar 54' (o.g.)

Estadio Olímpico Universitario, Mexico City
Attendance: 35,300
Referee: Fernando Guerrero (Mexico City)

Pumas won 4–3 on aggregate.

2 December 2018
18:30

América	3–2	Toluca
Martínez 3'; Valdez 24'; Aguilar 56'	Report	Sambueza 68'; William 87'

Estadio Azteca, Mexico City
Attendance: 44,118
Referee: César Arturo Ramos (Sinaloa)

América won 5–4 on aggregate.

== Semi-finals ==
Team 1	Agg.	Team 2	1st leg	2nd leg
Monterrey	1–1 (s)	Cruz Azul	1–0	0–1
Pumas	2–7	América	1–1	1–6

All times are UTC−5

=== First leg ===
5 December 2018
20:06

Monterrey	1–0	Cruz Azul
Pizarro 4'	Report

Estadio BBVA Bancomer, Guadalupe
Attendance: 36,621
Referee: César Arturo Ramos (Sinaloa)

6 December 2018
20:45

Pumas	1–1	América
Rodríguez 51'	Report	Lainez 21'

Estadio Olímpico Universitario, Mexico City
Attendance: 49,345
Referee: Luis Enrique Santander (Guanajuato)

=== Second leg ===
8 December 2018
19:00

Cruz Azul	1–0	Monterrey
Caraglio 55'	Report

Estadio Azteca, Mexico City
Attendance: 39,307
Referee: Fernando Guerrero (Mexico City)

1–1 on aggregate and tied on away goals. Cruz Azul advanced for being the higher seed in the classification table.

9 December 2018
18:45

América	6–1	Pumas
Ibarra 8'; Valdez 28'; Martínez 36'; Rodríguez 46'; Lainez 50'; Aguilera 71' (pen.)	Report	C. González 24'

Estadio Azteca, Mexico City
Attendance: 64,039
Referee: Jorge Isaac Rojas (Mexico City)

América won 7–2 on aggregate.

== Finals ==
Team 1	Agg.	Team 2	1st leg	2nd leg
América	2–0	Cruz Azul	0–0	2–0

=== First leg ===
13 December 2018
20:30

América	0–0	Cruz Azul
	Report

Estadio Azteca, Mexico City
Attendance: 59,244
Referee: Fernando Guerrero (Mexico City)

==== Details ====
América	Cruz Azul

GK	1	(Argentina) Agustín Marchesín
DF	3	(Mexico) Jorge Sánchez
DF	19	(Argentina) Emanuel Aguilera		(yellow card) 90+7'
DF	18	(Paraguay) Bruno Valdez
DF	22	(Mexico) Paul Aguilar (c)		(yellow card) 90+3'
MF	14	(United States) Joe Corona
MF	5	(Argentina) Guido Rodríguez
MF	20	(Mexico) Diego Lainez	(substituted off) 70'
MF	8	(Colombia) Mateus Uribe	(substituted off) 58'
MF	30	(Ecuador) Renato Ibarra		(yellow card) 42'
FW	9	(Colombia) Roger Martínez	(substituted off) 80'
Substitutions:
GK	27	(Mexico) Óscar Jiménez
DF	4	(Mexico) Edson Álvarez
DF	12	(Mexico) Luis Reyes
MF	10	(Paraguay) Cecilio Domínguez	(substituted on) 80'
MF	11	(Colombia) Andrés Ibargüen	(substituted on) 70'
FW	21	(Mexico) Henry Martín
FW	24	(Mexico) Oribe Peralta	(substituted on) 58'
Manager:
(Mexico) Miguel Herrera

GK	1	(Mexico) José de Jesús Corona (c)
DF	16	(Mexico) Adrián Aldrete
DF	5	(Chile) Igor Lichnovsky
DF	2	(Paraguay) Pablo Aguilar
DF	4	(Mexico) Julio César Domínguez
MF	23	(Argentina) Iván Marcone		(yellow card) 90+3'
MF	8	(Mexico) Javier Salas
MF	11	(Mexico) Elías Hernández	(substituted off) 78'
MF	25	(Mexico) Roberto Alvarado
MF	17	(Spain) Édgar Méndez		(yellow card) 88'
FW	9	(Argentina) Milton Caraglio	(substituted off) 89'	(yellow card) 18'
Substitutions:
GK	12	(Mexico) Guillermo Allison
DF	27	(Mexico) José Madueña
DF	30	(Mexico) Jordan Silva
MF	13	(Ecuador) Ángel Mena
MF	22	(Mexico) Rafael Baca	(substituted on) 78'
FW	7	(Uruguay) Martín Cauteruccio	(substituted on) 89'
FW	18	(Colombia) Andrés Rentería
Manager:
(Portugal) Pedro Caixinha

Assistant referees:
Marvin Torrentera (Mexico City)
Alberto Morin Méndez (Chihuahua)
Fourth official:
Luis Enrique Santander (Guanajuato)
Video assistant referee:
Miguel Ángel Chacón (Guerrero)
Assistant video assistant referee:
Quetzalli Alvarado (Mexico City)

==== Statistics ====
Statistic	América	Cruz Azul
Goals scored	0	0
Total shots	8	7
Shots on target	2	1
Saves	1	2
Ball possession	52%	48%
Corner kicks	2	2
Fouls committed	15	14
Offsides	1	3
Yellow cards	3	3
Red cards	0	0

=== Second leg ===
16 December 2018
18:30

Cruz Azul	0–2	América
	Report	Álvarez 51', 90'

Estadio Azteca, Mexico City
Attendance: 71,240
Referee: César Arturo Ramos (Sinaloa)

América won 2–0 on aggregate.

==== Details ====
Cruz Azul	América

GK	1	(Mexico) José de Jesús Corona (c)
DF	16	(Mexico) Adrián Aldrete	(substituted off) 81'
DF	5	(Chile) Igor Lichnovsky
DF	2	(Paraguay) Pablo Aguilar
DF	4	(Mexico) Julio César Domínguez
MF	11	(Mexico) Elías Hernández
MF	8	(Mexico) Javier Salas	(substituted off) 58'
MF	23	(Argentina) Iván Marcone
MF	17	(Spain) Édgar Méndez
FW	7	(Uruguay) Martín Cauteruccio	(substituted off) 46'	(yellow card) 16'
FW	9	(Argentina) Milton Caraglio
Substitutions:
GK	12	(Mexico) Guillermo Allison
DF	15	(Mexico) Gerardo Flores		(red card) 87'
DF	27	(Mexico) José Madueña
MF	13	(Ecuador) Ángel Mena	(substituted on) 81'
MF	22	(Mexico) Rafael Baca
MF	25	(Mexico) Roberto Alvarado	(substituted on) 46'	(yellow card) 82'
FW	18	(Colombia) Andrés Rentería	(substituted on) 58'
Manager:
(Portugal) Pedro Caixinha

GK	1	(Argentina) Agustín Marchesín
DF	3	(Mexico) Jorge Sánchez		(yellow card) 45+1'
DF	19	(Argentina) Emanuel Aguilera		(yellow card) 40'
DF	18	(Paraguay) Bruno Valdez
DF	22	(Mexico) Paul Aguilar
MF	20	(Mexico) Diego Lainez	(substituted off) 84'
MF	4	(Mexico) Edson Álvarez
MF	5	(Argentina) Guido Rodríguez
MF	30	(Ecuador) Renato Ibarra	(substituted off) 70'
FW	24	(Mexico) Oribe Peralta (c)	(substituted off) 77'	(yellow card) 64'
FW	21	(Mexico) Henry Martín
Substitutions:
GK	27	(Mexico) Óscar Jiménez
DF	12	(Mexico) Luis Reyes
MF	10	(Paraguay) Cecilio Domínguez	(substituted on) 70'
MF	11	(Colombia) Andrés Ibargüen	(substituted on) 84'	(yellow card) 86'
MF	14	(United States) Joe Corona	(substituted on) 77'
FW	17	(Argentina) Cristian Insaurralde
FW	23	(Mexico) Antonio López
Manager:
(Mexico) Miguel Herrera

Assistant referees:
José Luis Camargo (Estado de México)
Marcos Quintero (Jalisco)
Fourth official:
Jorge Isaac Rojas (Mexico City)
Video assistant referee:
Ángel Monroy (Morelos)

==== Statistics ====
Statistic	Cruz Azul	América
Goals scored	0	2
Total shots	5	12
Shots on target	0	9
Saves	7	0
Ball possession	55%	45%
Corner kicks	0	3
Fouls committed	11	21
Offsides	1	0
Yellow cards	2	4
Red cards	1	0

== Statistics ==
=== Goalscorers ===
3 goals

- (Paraguay) Bruno Valdez (América)

2 goals

- (Argentina) Emanuel Aguilera (América)
- (Mexico) Edson Álvarez (América)
- (Paraguay) Carlos González (Pumas)
- (Argentina) Rogelio Funes Mori (Monterrey)
- (Mexico) Diego Lainez (América)
- (Colombia) Roger Martínez (América)
- (Chile) Felipe Mora (Pumas)

1 goal

- (Paraguay) Pablo Aguilar (Cruz Azul)
- (Mexico) Paul Aguilar (América)
- (Argentina) Matías Alustiza (Pumas)
- (Mexico) Javier Aquino (UANL)
- (Argentina) Milton Caraglio (Cruz Azul)
- (Brazil) William (Toluca)
- (Mexico) Jesús Dueñas (UANL)
- (Mexico) Elías Hernández (Cruz Azul)
- (Ecuador) Renato Ibarra (América)
- (Spain) Édgar Méndez (Cruz Azul)
- (Mexico) Rodolfo Pizarro (Monterrey)
- (Argentina) Guido Rodríguez (América)
- (Chile) Martín Rodríguez (Pumas)
- (Mexico) Luis Romo (Querétaro)
- (Argentina) Rubens Sambueza (Toluca)
- (Argentina) Nicolás Sánchez (Monterrey)
- (Argentina) Fernando Tobio (Toluca)
- (Mexico) Alexis Vega (Toluca)

Own goal

- (Mexico) Alfredo Saldívar (for UANL)

=== Assists ===
4 assists

- (Colombia) Mateus Uribe (América)

2 assists

- (Mexico) Adrián Aldrete (Cruz Azul)
- (Ecuador) Renato Ibarra (América)
- (Argentina) Víctor Malcorra (Pumas)
- (Mexico) Oribe Peralta (América)
- (Mexico) Carlos Rodríguez (Monterrey)

1 assist

- (Mexico) Paul Aguilar (América)
- (Mexico) Javier Aquino (UANL)
- (Mexico) Pablo Barrera (Pumas)
- (Paraguay) Cecilio Domínguez (América)
- (Paraguay) Carlos González (Pumas)
- (Colombia) Avilés Hurtado (Monterrey)
- (Spain) Édgar Méndez (Cruz Azul)
- (Mexico) Alan Mozo (Pumas)
- (Colombia) Dorlan Pabón (Monterrey)
- (Argentina) Guido Pizarro (UANL)
- (Argentina) Rubens Sambueza (Toluca)
- (Mexico) Jorge Sánchez (América)
- (Argentina) Enrique Triverio (Toluca)
