= Clausura 2019 Copa MX final =

- Event: Clausura 2019 Copa MX
Juárez	América
0	1
- Date: 10 April 2019
- Venue: Estadio Olímpico Benito Juárez, Ciudad Juárez, Chihuahua
- Referee: Jorge Antonio Pérez
- Attendance: 19,797

The Clausura 2019 Copa MX final was the final of the Clausura 2019 Copa MX, the fourteenth edition of the Copa MX under its current format and 81st overall organized by the Mexican Football Federation, the governing body of association football in Mexico.

The final was contested in a single-leg format between Ascenso MX club Juárez and Liga MX club América. The match was hosted by Juárez at Estadio Olímpico Benito Juárez in Ciudad Juárez on 10 April 2019.

This was the third time a Liga MX and Ascenso MX face each other in the final; FC Juárez is the fifth Ascenso MX club overall to reach the final.

América won the match 1–0 and captured their record sixth title. As winners, América earned the right to face Cruz Azul in the 2019 Supercopa MX. However, they also won the Apertura 2018 Liga MX, and thus qualified for the 2019 Campeón de Campeones. They were replaced by the Supercopa MX title holders, Necaxa.

== Qualified teams ==
Team	Previous finals appearances (bold indicates winners)
Juárez	None
América	8 (1945, **1954**, **1955**, **1964**, **1965**, **1974**, 1976, 1991)

== Venue ==
Due to the tournament's regulations, the higher seed among both finalists during the group stage will host the final, thus Estadio Olímpico Benito Juárez will host the final. The venue which opened on 12 May 1981 has been home to FC Juárez since its inaugural season. The venue has previously hosted various Ascenso MX finals, most recently in the Apertura 2017 season when Juárez lost to Oaxaca on penalty kicks. The stadium was also home to Ciudad Juárez's previous football franchises, Cobras de Ciudad Juárez (1985–2005) and Indios de Ciudad Juárez (2005–2011), both of which at one point played in Mexico top-flight football league.

== Background ==
Juárez had never won the tournament while América had won it a record five times. Before reaching this final, the last time Juárez reached a reached a final of any kind was the Apertura 2017 Ascenso MX final where they lost to Oaxaca on penalty kicks. América last reached a final the previous December where they defeated Cruz Azul 2–0 on aggregate to capture their record thirteenth league title.

Juárez won three, drew one, lost none and scored seven goals during the group stage, as they were seeded second. They eliminated León on penalty kicks in the Round of 16, Veracruz on penalty kicks in the quarterfinals and UNAM in the semifinals.

América won three, drew none, lost one and scored six goals during the group stage, as they were seeded fourth. They eliminated Pachuca in the Round of 16, their arch-rivals Guadalajara in the quarterfinals and Tijuana in the semifinals.

== Road to the finals ==
Note: In all results below, the score of the finalist is given first.

Juárez		Round	América	
Opponent	Result	Group stage	Opponent	Result
Tampico Madero	3–0 (H)	Matchday 1	Necaxa	2–1 (A)
Puebla	2–1 (A)	Matchday 2	Atlético San Luis	1–0 (H)
Tampico Madero	1–0 (A)	Matchday 3	Atlético San Luis	0–2 (A)
Puebla	1–1 (H)	Matchday 4	Necaxa	3–1 (H)
**Group 2 winners**: Pos / Team / Pld / Pts; **1** / Juárez / **4** / **10**; 2 / Puebla / 4 / **4**; 3 / Tampico Madero / 4 / **3**; Source: Copa MX		Final standings	**Group 4 winners**: Pos / Team / Pld / Pts; **1** / América / **4** / **9**; 2 / Atlético San Luis / 4 / **6**; 3 / Necaxa / 4 / **3**; Source: Copa MX	
Opponent	Result	Knockout stage	Opponent	Result
León	0–0 (4–2 pen.) (H)	Round of 16	Pachuca	5–2 (H)
Veracruz	2–2 (3–1 pen.) (H)	Quarterfinals	Guadalajara	2–0 (H)
UNAM	2–0 (H)	Semifinals	Tijuana	4–0 (H)

== Match ==
10 April 2019
20:00 MDT (UTC−7)

Juárez	0–1	América
	Report	Aguilera 40' (pen.)

Estadio Olímpico Benito Juárez, Ciudad Juárez
Attendance: 19,797
Referee: Jorge Antonio Pérez

**Juárez**	**América**

GK	31	(Mexico) Iván Vázquez Mellado
DF	5	(Mexico) Eder Borelli (c)		(substituted off) 55'
DF	3	(Mexico) Luis López
DF	27	(Mexico) Christian Pérez
DF	22	(Mexico) Ricardo Chávez
MF	23	(Uruguay) Joaquín Noy
MF	7	(Brazil) Lucas Xavier		(substituted off) 70'
MF	182	(Mexico) Omar Panuco
MF	10	(Mexico) Edy Brambila
MF	15	(Mexico) Francisco Nevárez	(yellow card) 31'
FW	9	(Brazil) Leandro Carrijó		(substituted off) 70'
Substitutions:
GK	1	(Mexico) Enrique Palos
DF	2	(Uruguay) Jonathan Lacerda
MF	11	(Argentina) Mauro Fernández		(substituted on) 70'
MF	14	(Brazil) Elsinho
MF	17	(Mexico) Flavio Santos		(substituted on) 55'
MF	19	(Argentina) Gabriel Hachen		(substituted on) 70'
MF	207	(Mexico) Juan Montoya
Manager:
(Mexico) Gabriel Caballero

GK	1	(Argentina) Agustín Marchesín
DF	2	(Mexico) Carlos Vargas
DF	19	(Argentina) Emanuel Aguilera
DF	18	(Paraguay) Bruno Valdez
DF	22	(Mexico) Paul Aguilar (c)
MF	5	(Argentina) Guido Rodríguez	(yellow card) 82'
MF	4	(Mexico) Edson Álvarez
MF	14	(Colombia) Nicolás Benedetti		(substituted off) 60'
MF	287	(Mexico) José Guadalupe Hernández	(yellow card) 31'
MF	30	(Ecuador) Renato Ibarra		(substituted off) 71'
FW	21	(Mexico) Henry Martín		(substituted off) 85'
Substitutions:
GK	27	(Mexico) Óscar Jiménez
DF	3	(Mexico) Jorge Sánchez
DF	28	(Mexico) Oswaldo León
MF	8	(Colombia) Mateus Uribe		(substituted on) 60'
MF	11	(Colombia) Andrés Ibargüen	(yellow card) 90+3'	(substituted on) 85'
FW	9	(Colombia) Roger Martínez		(substituted on) 71'
FW	298	(Mexico) Arturo Sánchez
Manager:
(Mexico) Miguel Herrera

Assistant referees:
Alberto Morin Méndez
Michel Alejandro Morales
Fourth official:
Jonathan Hernandez Juárez

== Broadcasters ==
Country	Free	Pay	Ref
Mexico	Azteca 7 Canal 5	ESPN 2 Fox Sports 2 Izzi; TDN; TVC Deportes	
United States		ESPN Deportes; Univision Deportes Network	
