= Apertura 2019 Liga MX final phase =

Tournament details
- Dates: 27 November– 29 December 2019
- Teams: 8

Final positions
- Champions: Monterrey (5th title)
- Runners-up: América

Tournament statistics
- Matches played: 14
- Goals scored: 49 (3.5 per match)
- Attendance: 524,537 (37,467 per match)

The Apertura 2019 Liga MX championship stage commonly known as Liguilla (mini league) was played from 27 November 2019 to 29 December 2019. Due to finalist Monterrey participating in the 2019 FIFA Club World Cup, the final was postponed to 29 December from 15 December. A total of eight teams competed in the championship stage to decide the champions of the Apertura 2019 Liga MX season. Both finalists qualified to the 2021 CONCACAF Champions League.

== Qualified teams ==
The following 8 teams qualified for the championship stage.

In the following table, the number of appearances, last appearance, and previous best result count only those in the short tournament era starting from Invierno 1996 (not counting those in the long tournament era from 1943–44 to 1995–96).

Team	Seed	Points	Appearance	Last appearance	Previous best	Ref.
Santos Laguna	1	37	30th	Apertura 2018	Champions (6 times)	
León	2	33	11th	Clausura 2019	Champions (2 times)	
UANL	3	32	25th	Clausura 2019	Champions (5 times)	
Querétaro	4	31 (+12)	11th (Note: Includes the appearances of the original Jaguares de Chiapas franchise (2002–2013), which is how the franchise was previously known as.)	Apertura 2018	Runners-up (Clausura 2015)	
Necaxa	5	31 (+10, GF 33)	17th	Clausura 2019	Champions (Invierno 1998)	
América	6	31 (+10, GF 32)	33rd	Clausura 2019	Champions (5 times)	
Morelia	7	27 (+5)	25th	Clausura 2018	Champions (Invierno 2000)	
Monterrey	8	27 (+4)	23rd	Clausura 2019	Champions (4 times)	

== Format ==
- Teams were re-seeded each round.
- Team with more goals on aggregate after two matches advanced.
- Away goals rule was applied in the quarter-finals and semi-finals, but not the final.
- In the quarter-finals and semi-finals, if the two teams were tied on aggregate and away goals, the higher seeded team advanced.
- In the final, if the two teams were tied after both legs, the match went to extra time and, if necessary, a shoot-out.
- Both finalists qualified to the 2021 CONCACAF Champions League.

== Bracket ==
Quarter-finals
3	UANL	2	2	4
6	América	1	4	5
2	León	3	1	4
7	Morelia	3	2	5
4	Querétaro	0	2	2
5	Necaxa	3	3	6
1	Santos Laguna	2	1	3
8	Monterrey	5	1	6

Semi-finals
6	América (s)	0	2	2
7	Morelia	2	0	2
5	Necaxa	1	0	1
8	Monterrey	2	1	3

Finals
6	América	1	2	3 (2)
8	Monterrey (p)	2	1	3 (4)

== Quarter-finals ==
Team 1	Agg.	Team 2	1st leg	2nd leg
Monterrey	6–3	Santos Laguna	5–2	1–1
Morelia	5–4	León	3–3	2–1
América	5–4	UANL	1–2	4–2
Necaxa	6–2	Querétaro	3–0	3–2

=== First leg ===
27 November 2019
19:00

Morelia	3–3	León
Flores 10', 32'; Mendoza 90+6'	Report	Macías 8' (pen.); Mena 18'; Navarro 48'

Estadio Morelos, Morelia
Attendance: 30,182
Referee: José Alfredo Peñaloza (Mexico City)

27 November 2019
21:00

Necaxa	3–0	Querétaro
Calderón 52'; Gallegos 82'; Herrera 90+1'	Report

Estadio Victoria, Aguascalientes
Attendance: 13,705
Referee: Diego Montaño Robles (Jalisco)

28 November 2019
19:06

Monterrey	5–2	Santos Laguna
Pabón 2', 85'; Sánchez 8'; Arteaga 54' (o.g.); Janssen 70' (pen.)	Report	Furch 23'; Castillo 45'

Estadio BBVA, Guadalupe
Attendance: 33,635
Referee: Jorge Isaac Rojas (Mexico City)

28 November 2019
21:05

América	1–2	UANL
R. Sánchez 40'	Report	Pizarro 51'; Gignac 67' (pen.)

Estadio Azteca, Mexico City
Attendance: 45,005
Referee: Fernando Guerrero (Mexico City)

=== Second leg ===
30 November 2019
19:00

León	1–2	Morelia
Sosa 52'	Report	Sansores 67'; Flores 72'

Estadio León, León
Attendance: 22,872
Referee: Marco Antonio Ortiz (Durango)

Morelia won 5–4 on aggregate

30 November 2019
21:05

Querétaro	2–3	Necaxa
M. Ruiz 4'; Lucumí 17'	Report	Calderón 79'; Gallegos 86'; Salas 90'

Estadio Corregidora, Querétaro
Attendance: 23,827
Referee: Fernando Hernández (Mexico City)

Necaxa won 6–2 on aggregate

1 December 2019
19:00

Santos Laguna	1–1	Monterrey
B. Lozano 20'	Report	Janssen 57'

Estadio Corona, Torreón
Attendance: 25,642
Referee: Luis Enrique Santander (Guanajuato)

Monterrey won 6–3 on aggregate

1 December 2019
21:00

UANL	2–4	América
Aquino 57'; Gignac 71'	Report	Viñas 21'; Rodríguez 31'; Dos Santos 45'; Aguilera 80' (pen.)

Estadio Universitario, San Nicolás de los Garza
Attendance: 41,615
Referee: César Ramos (Sinaloa)

América won 5–4 on aggregate

== Semi-finals ==
Team 1	Agg.	Team 2	1st leg	2nd leg
Monterrey	3–1	Necaxa	2–1	1–0
Morelia	2–2 (s)	América	2–0	0–2

=== First leg ===
4 December 2019
21:06

Monterrey	2–1	Necaxa
Gallardo 10'; Janssen 73'	Report	Quiroga 64'

Estadio BBVA, Guadalupe
Attendance: 42,092
Referee: Fernando Hernández (Mexico City)

5 December 2019
20:30

Morelia	2–0	América
Aristeguieta 16'; Rocha 51'	Report

Estadio Morelos, Morelia
Attendance: 33,200
Referee: Jorge Isaac Rojas (Mexico City)

=== Second leg ===
7 December 2019
20:30

Necaxa	0–1	Monterrey
	Report	Funes Mori 90+5'

Estadio Victoria, Aguascalientes
Attendance: 23,851
Referee: César Ramos (Sinaloa)

Monterrey won 3–1 on aggregate

8 December 2019
18:30

América	2–0	Morelia
Ibarra 37'; Viñas 44'	Report

Estadio Azteca, Mexico City
Attendance: 63,263
Referee: Luis Enrique Santander (Guanajuato)

2–2 on aggregate and tied on away goals. América advanced due to being the higher seed in the classification table

== Finals ==
Team 1	Agg.	Team 2	1st leg	2nd leg
Monterrey	3–3 (4–2 p)	América	2–1	1–2 (a.e.t.)

=== First leg ===
26 December 2019
20:36

Monterrey	2–1	América
Medina 45+1'; Funes Mori 90+3'	Report	C. Rodríguez 45' (o.g.)

Estadio BBVA, Guadalupe
Attendance: 52,929
Referee: Luis Enrique Santander (Guanajuato)

==== Details ====
Monterrey	América

GK	1	(Argentina) Marcelo Barovero
DF	11	(Argentina) Leonel Vangioni	(substituted off) 69'
DF	4	(Argentina) Nicolás Sánchez
DF	3	(Mexico) César Montes	(substituted off) 69'
DF	33	(Colombia) Stefan Medina
MF	16	(Paraguay) Celso Ortiz
MF	29	(Mexico) Carlos Rodríguez
MF	17	(Mexico) Jesús Gallardo
MF	20	(Mexico) Rodolfo Pizarro	(substituted off) 80'
MF	8	(Colombia) Dorlan Pabón (c)		(yellow card) 65'
FW	7	(Argentina) Rogelio Funes Mori
Substitutions:
GK	22	(Mexico) Luis Cárdenas
DF	19	(Mexico) Miguel Layún	(substituted on) 69'
DF	23	(Mexico) Johan Vásquez
MF	21	(Mexico) Alfonso González
MF	25	(Mexico) Jonathan González
MF	32	(Argentina) Maximiliano Meza	(substituted on) 80'
FW	9	(Netherlands) Vincent Janssen	(substituted on) 69'	(yellow card) 90+6'
Manager:
(Argentina) Antonio Mohamed

GK	6	(Mexico) Guillermo Ochoa
DF	3	(Mexico) Jorge Sánchez		(yellow card) 90+5'
DF	19	(Argentina) Emanuel Aguilera
DF	18	(Paraguay) Bruno Valdez
DF	22	(Mexico) Paul Aguilar (c)
MF	5	(Argentina) Guido Rodríguez		(yellow card) 90+2'
MF	20	(Paraguay) Richard Sánchez
MF	11	(Colombia) Andrés Ibargüen	(substituted off) 40'
MF	17	(Mexico) Sebastián Córdova		(red card) 53'
FW	24	(Uruguay) Federico Viñas	(substituted off) 81'
FW	21	(Mexico) Henry Martín	(substituted off) 58'
Substitutions:
GK	27	(Mexico) Óscar Jiménez
DF	2	(Mexico) Carlos Vargas
MF	14	(Colombia) Nicolás Benedetti	(substituted on) 81'	(yellow card) 90+6'
MF	25	(Mexico) Rubén González	(substituted on) 58'
FW	9	(Colombia) Roger Martínez	(substituted on) 40'
FW	10	(Mexico) Giovani dos Santos
FW	15	(Chile) Nicolás Castillo
Manager:
(Mexico) Miguel Herrera

Assistant referees:
Christian Espinosa Zavala (Mexico City)
César Cerritos García (Guanajuato)
Fourth official:
Fernando Hernández Gómez (Veracruz)
Video assistant referee:
Quetzalli Alvarado (Mexico City)
Assistant video assistant referee:
Igor Itzsvan Flores (Oaxaca)

==== Statistics ====
Statistic	Monterrey	América
Goals scored	2	1
Total shots	19	8
Shots on target	6	2
Saves	1	4
Ball possession	64%	36%
Corner kicks	5	3
Fouls committed	13	17
Offsides	0	2
Yellow cards	2	3
Red cards	0	1

=== Second leg ===
==== Details ====
29 December 2019
20:15

América	2–1 (a.e.t.)	Monterrey
Viñas 6'; R. Sánchez 41'	Report	Funes Mori 75'
Penalties
Castillo (penalty missed); Aguilera (penalty scored); G. Rodríguez (penalty missed); Dos Santos (penalty scored)	2–4	(penalty scored) Janssen; (penalty missed) Medina; (penalty scored) Funes Mori; (penalty scored) N. Sánchez; (penalty scored) Vangioni

Estadio Azteca, Mexico City
Attendance: 72,719
Referee: César Ramos (Sinaloa)

3–3 on aggregate. Monterrey won 4–2 on penalties

América	Monterrey

GK	6	(Mexico) Guillermo Ochoa
DF	3	(Mexico) Jorge Sánchez
DF	19	(Argentina) Emanuel Aguilera
DF	18	(Paraguay) Bruno Valdez
DF	22	(Mexico) Paul Aguilar (c)
MF	5	(Argentina) Guido Rodríguez		(yellow card) 20'
MF	30	(Ecuador) Renato Ibarra	(substituted off) 28'
MF	20	(Paraguay) Richard Sánchez	(substituted off) 68'
FW	24	(Uruguay) Federico Viñas		(yellow card) 97'
FW	21	(Mexico) Henry Martín	(substituted off) 96'
FW	9	(Colombia) Roger Martínez	(substituted off) 88'
Substitutions:
GK	27	(Mexico) Óscar Jiménez
DF	2	(Mexico) Carlos Vargas
MF	14	(Colombia) Nicolás Benedetti	(substituted on) 28'	(yellow card) 56'
MF	23	(Mexico) Antonio López
MF	25	(Mexico) Rubén González	(substituted on) 68'
FW	10	(Mexico) Giovani dos Santos	(substituted on) 88'
FW	15	(Chile) Nicolás Castillo	(substituted on) 96'
Manager:
(Mexico) Miguel Herrera

GK	1	(Argentina) Marcelo Barovero
DF	11	(Argentina) Leonel Vangioni		(yellow card) 90+1'
DF	4	(Argentina) Nicolás Sánchez
DF	33	(Colombia) Stefan Medina		(yellow card) 80'
DF	19	(Mexico) Miguel Layún	(substituted off) 57'
MF	16	(Paraguay) Celso Ortiz
MF	29	(Mexico) Carlos Rodríguez
MF	17	(Mexico) Jesús Gallardo	(substituted off) 71'
MF	20	(Mexico) Rodolfo Pizarro	(substituted off) 46'	(yellow card) 30'
MF	8	(Colombia) Dorlan Pabón (c)	(substituted off) 108'
FW	7	(Argentina) Rogelio Funes Mori
Substitutions:
GK	22	(Mexico) Luis Cárdenas
DF	3	(Mexico) César Montes	(substituted on) 57'
DF	23	(Mexico) Johan Vásquez
MF	21	(Mexico) Alfonso González	(substituted on) 108'
MF	25	(Mexico) Jonathan González
MF	32	(Argentina) Maximiliano Meza	(substituted on) 71'
FW	9	(Netherlands) Vincent Janssen	(substituted on) 46'
Manager:
(Argentina) Antonio Mohamed

Assistant referees:
Alberto Morin Méndez (Chihuahua)
Andrés Hernández Delgado (Mexico City)
Fourth official:
Jorge Isaac Rojas (Mexico City)
Video assistant referee:
Miguel Ángel Chacón (Guerrero)
Assistant video assistant referee:
Miguel Ángel Reynoso (Nayarit)

==== Statistics ====
Statistic	América	Monterrey
Goals scored	2	1
Total shots	22	16
Shots on target	7	6
Saves	5	5
Ball possession	48%	52%
Corner kicks	7	8
Fouls committed	18	23
Offsides	1	0
Yellow cards	3	3
Red cards	0	0

== Statistics ==
=== Goalscorers ===
There were 48 goals scored in 14 matches, for an average of 3.43 goals per match.

3 goals

- (Peru) Edison Flores (Morelia)
- (Argentina) Rogelio Funes Mori (Monterrey)
- (Netherlands) Vincent Janssen (Monterrey)
- (Uruguay) Federico Viñas (América)

2 goals

- (Mexico) Cristian Calderón (Necaxa)
- (Chile) Felipe Gallegos (Necaxa)
- (France) André-Pierre Gignac (UANL)
- (Colombia) Dorlan Pabón (Monterrey)
- (Paraguay) Richard Sánchez (América)

1 goal

- (Argentina) Emanuel Aguilera (América)
- (Mexico) Javier Aquino (UANL)
- (Venezuela) Fernando Aristeguieta (Morelia)
- (Ecuador) Erick Castillo (Santos Laguna)
- (Mexico) Giovani dos Santos (América)
- (Argentina) Julio Furch (Santos Laguna)
- (Mexico) Jesús Gallardo (Monterrey)
- (Mexico) Eduardo Herrera (Necaxa)
- (Ecuador) Renato Ibarra (América)
- (Uruguay) Brian Lozano (Santos Laguna)
- (Colombia) Jeison Lucumí (Querétaro)
- (Mexico) José Juan Macías (León)
- (Colombia) Stefan Medina (Monterrey)
- (Ecuador) Ángel Mena (León)
- (Mexico) Fernando Navarro (León)
- (Argentina) Guido Pizarro (UANL)
- (Argentina) Mauro Quiroga (Necaxa)
- (Mexico) Aldo Rocha (Morelia)
- (Argentina) Guido Rodríguez (América)
- (Mexico) Marcel Ruiz (Querétaro)
- (Argentina) Maximiliano Salas (Necaxa)
- (Argentina) Nicolás Sánchez (Monterrey)
- (Mexico) Miguel Sansores (Morelia)
- (Argentina) Ismael Sosa (León)

1 own goal

- (Mexico) Gerardo Arteaga (against Monterrey)
- (Mexico) Carlos Rodríguez (against América)

=== Assists ===
3 assists

- (Mexico) Jesús Angulo (Necaxa)

2 assists

- (Mexico) Jesús Gallardo (Monterrey)
- (Mexico) Luis Ángel Mendoza (Morelia)
- (Chile) Rodrigo Millar (Morelia)
- (Colombia) Dorlan Pabón (Monterrey)
- (Mexico) Carlos Rodríguez (Monterrey)

1 assist

- (Mexico) Paul Aguilar (América)
- (Colombia) Ayron del Valle (Querétaro)
- (Mexico) Jesús Dueñas (UANL)
- (Argentina) Julio Furch (Santos Laguna)
- (France) André-Pierre Gignac (UANL)
- (Colombia) Andrés Ibargüen (América)
- (Ecuador) Renato Ibarra (América)
- (Netherlands) Vincent Janssen (Monterrey)
- (Mexico) Henry Martín (América)
- (Mexico) José Martínez (Morelia)
- (Colombia) Roger Martínez (América)
- (Ecuador) Kevin Mercado (Necaxa)
- (Mexico) Fernando Navarro (León)
- (Mexico) Iván Ochoa (León)
- (Mexico) Rodolfo Pizarro (Monterrey)
- (Mexico) Hugo Isaác Rodríguez (Santos Laguna)
- (Paraguay) Richard Sánchez (América)
- (Chile) Diego Valdés (Santos Laguna)
- (Mexico) Efraín Velarde (Morelia)
