= 2019 Campeones Cup =

Football match

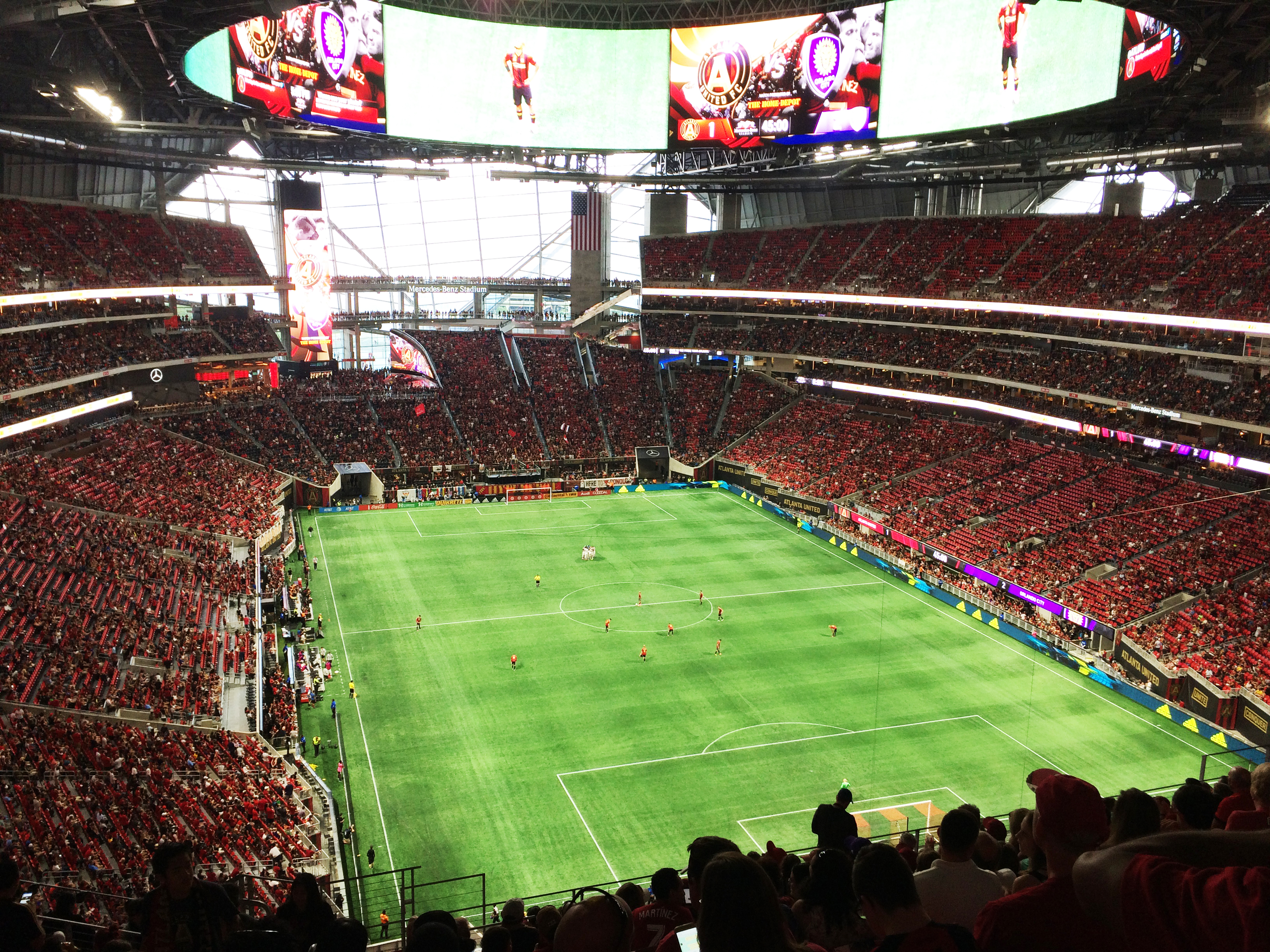
- The Mercedes-Benz Stadium in Atlanta, Georgia hosted the match
- Event: Campeones Cup
Atlanta United FC	América
(United States)	(Mexico)
3	2
- Date: August 14, 2019
- Venue: Mercedes-Benz Stadium, Atlanta, Georgia
- Man of the Match: Darlington Nagbe (Atlanta United FC)
- Referee: Joel Aguilar (El Salvador)
- Attendance: 40,128

The 2019 Campeones Cup was the second edition of the Campeones Cup, an annual North American football match contested between the champions of the previous Major League Soccer season and the winner of the Campeón de Campeones from Liga MX.

The match featured Atlanta United FC, winners of the 2018 MLS Cup, and América, winners of the 2019 Campeón de Campeones. Atlanta United hosted the match at Mercedes-Benz Stadium in Atlanta, Georgia, United States, on August 14, 2019.

== Venue ==
Atlanta United FC hosted the match at their home stadium, Mercedes-Benz Stadium in Atlanta, Georgia, United States. The announced attendance was 40,128 (a Campeones Cup Record). Although the stadium can hold 71,000, the upper deck was curtained off, limiting the capacity to 42,000.

== Match ==
=== Details ===
August 14, 2019
8:00 p.m. EDT

Atlanta United FC (United States)	3–2	(Mexico) América
Hyndman 5'; Larentowicz 59'; J. Martínez 65' (pen.)	Report	Ibarra 13'; R. Martínez 57'

Mercedes-Benz Stadium, Atlanta, Georgia
Attendance: 40,128
Referee: Joel Aguilar (El Salvador)

Atlanta United FC	América

GK	25	(United States) Alec Kann
DF	2	(Argentina) Franco Escobar		(substituted off) 44'
DF	4	(Guinea) Florentin Pogba
DF	5	(Argentina) Leandro González Pírez
DF	24	(Germany) Julian Gressel
MF	6	(United States) Darlington Nagbe
MF	16	(United States) Emerson Hyndman
MF	18	(United States) Jeff Larentowicz (c)	(yellow card) 28'
FW	7	(Venezuela) Josef Martínez
FW	10	(Argentina) Gonzalo Martínez		(substituted off) 90+2'
FW	28	(England) Dion Pereira		(substituted off) 66'
Substitutions:
GK	1	(United States) Brad Guzan
DF	3	(United States) Michael Parkhurst
DF	12	(United States) Miles Robinson		(substituted on) 44'
MF	8	(Argentina) Ezequiel Barco		(substituted on) 90+2'
MF	14	(Iraq) Justin Meram		(substituted on) 66'
MF	29	(England) Mo Adams
FW	15	(Paraguay) Héctor Villalba
Manager:
(Netherlands) Frank de Boer

GK	27	(Mexico) Óscar Jiménez
DF	2	(Mexico) Carlos Vargas	(yellow card) 80'
DF	3	(Mexico) Jorge Sánchez
DF	18	(Paraguay) Bruno Valdez	(yellow card) 41' (yellow-red card) 72'
DF	22	(Mexico) Paul Aguilar (c)
MF	5	(Argentina) Guido Rodríguez
MF	9	(Colombia) Roger Martínez
MF	11	(Colombia) Andrés Ibargüen		(substituted off) 90+2'
MF	17	(Mexico) Sebastián Córdova		(substituted off) 83'
MF	30	(Ecuador) Renato Ibarra
FW	21	(Mexico) Henry Martín		(substituted off) 71'
Substitutions:
GK	35	(United States) Luis Zamudio
DF	19	(Argentina) Emanuel Aguilera
MF	13	(Mexico) Leonel López
MF	14	(Colombia) Nicolás Benedetti		(substituted on) 71'
MF	23	(Mexico) Antonio López		(substituted on) 83'
MF	25	(Mexico) Fernando González
FW	187	(Mexico) Israel García		(substituted on) 90+2'
Manager:
(Mexico) Miguel Herrera

Assistant referees:
Juan Zumba (El Salvador)
Walter López (Honduras)
Fourth official:
Iván Barton (El Salvador)

=== Statistics ===
Statistic	Atlanta United FC	América
Goals scored	3	2
Total shots	17	15
Shots on target	10	6
Saves	4	5
Ball possession	58%	42%
Corner kicks	8	4
Fouls committed	21	21
Offsides	0	1
Yellow cards	1	1
Red cards	0	1
