= Clausura 2019 Liga MX final phase =

Clausura 2019 Final phase
Tournament details
- Country: Mexico
- Dates: 8 May–26 May 2019
- Teams: 8

Final positions
- Champions: UANL
- Runners-up: León

Tournament statistics
- Matches played: 14
- Goals scored: 23 (1.64 per match)
- Attendance: 437,856 (31,275 per match)

The Clausura 2019 Liga MX championship stage commonly known as Liguilla (mini league) was played from 8 May 2019 to 26 May 2019. A total of eight teams competed in the championship stage to decide the champions of the Clausura 2019 Liga MX season. Both finalists qualified to the 2020 CONCACAF Champions League.

== Qualified teams ==
The following 8 teams qualified for the championship stage.

In the following table, the number of appearances, last appearance, and previous best result count only those in the short tournament era starting from Invierno 1996 (not counting those in the long tournament era from 1943–44 to 1995–96).

Team	Seed	Points	Appearance	Last appearance	Previous best	Ref.
León	1	41	10th	Apertura 2017	Champions (2 times)	
UANL	2	37	24th	Apertura 2018	Champions (4 times)	
Monterrey	3	30 (+14)	22nd	Apertura 2018	Champions (3 times)	
Cruz Azul	4	30 (+9)	28th	Apertura 2018	Champions (Invierno 1997)	
América	5	29 (+9)	32nd	Apertura 2018	Champions (5 times)	
Necaxa	6	29 (+8)	16th	Apertura 2016	Champions (Invierno 1998)	
Pachuca	7	28 (+6)	21st	Apertura 2016	Champions (6 times)	
Tijuana	8	28 (+5)	7th	Clausura 2018	Champions (Apertura 2012)	

== Format ==
- Teams were re-seeded each round.
- Team with more goals on aggregate after two matches advanced.
- Away goals rule was applied in the quarter-finals and semi-finals, but not the final.
- In the quarter-finals and semi-finals, if the two teams were tied on aggregate and away goals, the higher seeded team advanced.
- In the final, if the two teams were tied after both legs, the match went to extra time and, if necessary, a shoot-out.
- Both finalists qualified to the 2020 CONCACAF Champions League.

== Bracket ==
Quarter-finals
1	León	3	2	5
8	Tijuana	1	1	2
4	Cruz Azul	1	1	2
5	América	3	0	3
2	UANL (s)	1	1	2
7	Pachuca	1	1	2
3	Monterrey (s)	0	1	1
6	Necaxa	1	0	1

Semi-finals
1	León (s)	1	0	1
5	América	0	1	1
2	UANL (s)	0	1	1
3	Monterrey	1	0	1

Finals
1	León	0	0	0
2	UANL	1	0	1

== Quarter-finals ==
Team 1	Agg.	Team 2	1st leg	2nd leg
Tijuana	2–5	León	1–3	1–2
Pachuca	2–2 (s)	UANL	1–1	1–1
Necaxa	1–1 (s)	Monterrey	1–0	0–1
América	3–2	Cruz Azul	3–1	0–1

=== First leg ===
8 May 2019
19:00 CDT (UTC−6)

Pachuca	1–1	UANL
Rodríguez 19' (o.g.)	Report	Aquino 22'

Estadio Hidalgo, Pachuca
Attendance: 21,298
Referee: Eduardo Galván (Mexico City)

8 May 2019
19:06 PDT (UTC−8)

Tijuana	1–3	León
Bou 47'	Report	Macías 32'; Braghieri 65' (o.g.); Sambueza 71'

Estadio Caliente, Tijuana
Attendance: 25,333
Referee: Luis Enrique Santander (Guanajuato)

9 May 2019
19:00 CDT (UTC−6)

Necaxa	1–0	Monterrey
Calderón 45+2'	Report

Estadio Victoria, Aguascalientes
Attendance: 14,627
Referee: Diego Montaño Robles (Jalisco)

9 May 2019
21:00 CDT (UTC−6)

América	3–1	Cruz Azul
Lichnovsky 21' (o.g.); Martínez 45+1', 74'	Report	Caraglio 15' (pen.)

Estadio Azteca, Mexico City
Attendance: 31,450
Referee: Jorge Isaac Rojas (Mexico City)

=== Second leg ===
11 May 2019
19:00 CDT (UTC−6)

UANL	1–1	Pachuca
Gignac 84'	Report	Sagal 81'

Estadio Universitario, San Nicolás de los Garza
Attendance: 41,615
Referee: Jorge Antonio Pérez (Veracruz)

2–2 on aggregate and tied on away goals. UANL advanced for being the higher seed in the classification table.

11 May 2019
19:00 CDT (UTC−6)

León	2–1	Tijuana
Campbell 9', 29'	Report	Bou 44'

Estadio León, León
Attendance: 23,291
Referee: Francisco Chacón (Guanajuato)

León won 5–2 on aggregate.

12 May 2019
18:00 CDT (UTC−6)

Cruz Azul	1–0	América
Rodríguez 48'	Report

Estadio Azteca, Mexico City
Attendance: 34,779
Referee: Fernando Guerrero (Mexico City)

América won 3–2 on aggregate.

12 May 2019
20:00 CDT (UTC−6)

Monterrey	1–0	Necaxa
Pizarro 42'	Report

Estadio BBVA Bancomer, Guadalupe
Attendance: 33,884
Referee: César Arturo Ramos (Sinaloa)

1–1 on aggregate. Monterrey advanced for being the higher seed in the classification table.

== Semi-finals ==
Team 1	Agg.	Team 2	1st leg	2nd leg
América	1–1 (s)	León	0–1	1–0
Monterrey	1–1 (s)	UANL	1–0	0–1

=== First leg ===
15 May 2019
21:06 CDT (UTC−6)

Monterrey	1–0	UANL
Pabón 13'	Report

Estadio BBVA Bancomer, Guadalupe
Attendance: 48,269
Referee: Jorge Isaac Rojas (Mexico City)

16 May 2019 (Note: The América v León match was originally scheduled for 15 May but was postponed due to poor air quality around Mexico City. As a result, the second leg was also postponed one day.)
20:30 CDT (UTC−6)

América	0–1	León
	Report	Macías 70'

Estadio Corregidora, Querétaro (Note: The match was originally scheduled to take place at Estadio Azteca, despite the poor air quality, but was later moved to Querétaro.)
Attendance: 27,228
Referee: Jorge Antonio Pérez (Veracruz)

=== Second leg ===
18 May 2019
19:00 CDT (UTC−6)

UANL	1–0	Monterrey
Pizarro 42'	Report

Estadio Universitario, San Nicolás de los Garza
Attendance: 41,615
Referee: Marco Antonio Ortiz (Durango)

1–1 on aggregate. UANL advanced for being the higher seed in the classification table.

19 May 2019
20:06 CDT (UTC−6)

León	0–1	América
	Report	Valdez 6'

Estadio León, León
Attendance: 26,721
Referee: César Arturo Ramos (Sinaloa)

1–1 on aggregate. León advanced for being the higher seed in the classification table.

== Finals ==
Team 1	Agg.	Team 2	1st leg	2nd leg
UANL	1–0	León	1–0	0–0

=== First leg ===
23 May 2019
20:45 CDT (UTC−6)

UANL	1–0	León
Gignac 21'	Report

Estadio Universitario, San Nicolás de los Garza
Attendance: 41,615
Referee: Marco Antonio Ortiz (Durango)

==== Details ====
UANL	León

GK	1	(Argentina) Nahuel Guzmán
DF	6	(Mexico) Jorge Torres Nilo
DF	21	(Colombia) Francisco Meza		(yellow card) 70'
DF	4	(Mexico) Hugo Ayala
DF	28	(Mexico) Luis Rodríguez
MF	19	(Argentina) Guido Pizarro (c)		(yellow card) 90+3'
MF	5	(Brazil) Rafael Carioca
MF	20	(Mexico) Javier Aquino	(substituted off) 78'
MF	9	(Chile) Eduardo Vargas	(substituted off) 60'
MF	26	(Colombia) Luis Quiñones	(substituted off) 85'	(yellow card) 83'
FW	10	(France) André-Pierre Gignac
Substitutions:
GK	22	(Mexico) Lalo Fernández
DF	14	(Mexico) Juan José Sánchez
DF	15	(Mexico) Francisco Venegas
MF	36	(Mexico) Eduardo Tercero
MF	8	(Argentina) Lucas Zelarayán	(substituted on) 85'
MF	25	(Mexico) Jürgen Damm	(substituted on) 78'
FW	13	(Ecuador) Enner Valencia	(substituted on) 60'
Manager:
(Brazil) Ricardo Ferretti

GK	30	(Mexico) Rodolfo Cota
DF	6	(Colombia) William Tesillo		(yellow card) 22'
DF	23	(Argentina) Ramiro González
DF	4	(Colombia) Andrés Mosquera
DF	5	(Mexico) Fernando Navarro		(yellow card) 90'
MF	16	(Chile) Jean Meneses	(substituted off) 78'
MF	10	(Mexico) Luis Montes (c)
MF	12	(Mexico) Iván Rodríguez
MF	13	(Ecuador) Ángel Mena
FW	33	(Ecuador) Vinicio Angulo
FW	8	(Costa Rica) Joel Campbell		(yellow card) 87'
Substitutions:
GK	25	(United States) William Yarbrough
DF	22	(Mexico) Miguel Herrera
DF	32	(Chile) Dilan Zúñiga
MF	11	(Colombia) Yairo Moreno	(substituted on) 78'
MF	15	(Mexico) Iván Ochoa
MF	19	(Mexico) Jorge Díaz
FW	27	(Colombia) Juan José Calero
Manager:
(Mexico) Ignacio Ambríz

Assistant referees:
Alberto Morin Méndez (Chihuahua)
Enríque Isaac Bustos (Guerrero)
Fourth official:
Jorge Antonio Pérez (Veracruz)
Video assistant referee:
Quetzalli Alvarado (Mexico City)

==== Statistics ====
Statistic	UANL	León
Goals scored	1	0
Total shots	20	9
Shots on target	6	4
Saves	4	5
Ball possession	54%	46%
Corner kicks	9	3
Fouls committed	16	13
Offsides	1	0
Yellow cards	3	3
Red cards	0	0

=== Second leg ===
26 May 2019
20:06 CDT (UTC−6)

León	0–0	UANL
	Report

Estadio León, León
Attendance: 26,131
Referee: César Arturo Ramos (Sinaloa)

UANL won 1–0 on aggregate.

==== Details ====
León	UANL

GK	30	(Mexico) Rodolfo Cota
DF	6	(Colombia) William Tesillo
DF	23	(Argentina) Ramiro González	(substituted off) 64'
DF	4	(Colombia) Andrés Mosquera		(yellow card) 88' (red card) 90+3'
DF	5	(Mexico) Fernando Navarro
MF	12	(Mexico) Iván Rodríguez		(yellow card) 71'
MF	10	(Mexico) Luis Montes (c)
MF	11	(Colombia) Yairo Moreno
MF	14	(Argentina) Rubens Sambueza
MF	13	(Ecuador) Ángel Mena	(substituted off) 32'
FW	8	(Costa Rica) Joel Campbell
Substitutions:
GK	25	(United States) William Yarbrough
DF	22	(Mexico) Miguel Herrera
MF	15	(Mexico) Iván Ochoa
MF	16	(Chile) Jean Meneses	(substituted on) 32'
MF	19	(Mexico) Jorge Díaz
FW	27	(Colombia) Juan José Calero
FW	33	(Ecuador) Vinicio Angulo	(substituted on) 64'
Manager:
(Mexico) Ignacio Ambríz

GK	1	(Argentina) Nahuel Guzmán		(yellow card) 81'
DF	6	(Mexico) Jorge Torres Nilo
DF	21	(Colombia) Francisco Meza
DF	4	(Mexico) Hugo Ayala
DF	28	(Mexico) Luis Rodríguez
MF	19	(Argentina) Guido Pizarro (c)		(yellow card) 90+1'
MF	5	(Brazil) Rafael Carioca	(substituted off) 77'	(yellow card) 77'
MF	20	(Mexico) Javier Aquino	(substituted off) 46'
MF	9	(Chile) Eduardo Vargas	(substituted off) 62'
MF	26	(Colombia) Luis Quiñones		(yellow card) 64'
FW	10	(France) André-Pierre Gignac
Substitutions:
GK	30	(Mexico) Miguel Ortega
DF	3	(Mexico) Carlos Salcedo	(substituted on) 77'
MF	29	(Mexico) Jesús Dueñas	(substituted on) 46'
MF	36	(Mexico) Eduardo Tercero
MF	8	(Argentina) Lucas Zelarayán
MF	25	(Mexico) Jürgen Damm
FW	13	(Ecuador) Enner Valencia	(substituted on) 62'
Manager:
(Brazil) Ricardo Ferretti

Assistant referees:
Miguel Ángel Hernández (Puebla)
Christian Kiabek Espinosa (Mexico City)
Fourth official:
Jorge Isaac Rojas (Mexico City)
Video assistant referee:
León Vicente Barajas (Mexico City)

==== Statistics ====
Statistic	León	UANL
Goals scored	0	0
Total shots	14	9
Shots on target	5	3
Saves	3	5
Ball possession	57%	43%
Corner kicks	8	1
Fouls committed	13	15
Offsides	2	0
Yellow cards	2	4
Red cards	1	0

== Statistics ==
=== Goalscorers ===
2 goals

- (Argentina) Gustavo Bou (Tijuana)
- (Costa Rica) Joel Campbell (León)
- (France) André-Pierre Gignac (UANL)
- (Mexico) José Juan Macías (León)
- (Colombia) Roger Martínez (América)

1 goal

- (Mexico) Javier Aquino (UANL)
- (Mexico) Cristian Calderón (Necaxa)
- (Argentina) Milton Caraglio (Cruz Azul)
- (Colombia) Dorlan Pabón (Monterrey)
- (Argentina) Guido Pizarro (UANL)
- (Mexico) Rodolfo Pizarro (Monterrey)
- (Uruguay) Jonathan Rodríguez (Cruz Azul)
- (Chile) Ángelo Sagal (Pachuca)
- (Argentina) Rubens Sambueza (León)
- (Paraguay) Bruno Valdez (América)

1 own goal

- (Argentina) Diego Braghieri (against León)
- (Chile) Igor Lichnovsky (against América)
- (Mexico) Luis Rodríguez (against Pachuca)

=== Assists ===
2 assists

- (Brazil) Rafael Carioca (UANL)
- (Colombia) Andrés Ibargüen (América)
- (Ecuador) Ángel Mena (León)

1 assist

- (Mexico) Roberto Alvarado (Cruz Azul)
- (Mexico) Daniel Álvarez (Necaxa)
- (Ecuador) Miller Bolaños (Tijuana)
- (Colombia) Edwin Cardona (Pachuca)
- (Colombia) Andrés Ibargüen (América)
- (Ecuador) Renato Ibarra (América)
- (Mexico) Miguel Layún (Monterrey)
- (Mexico) Luis Montes (León)
- (Argentina) Ariel Nahuelpán (Tijuana)
- (Argentina) Rubens Sambueza (León)
- (Colombia) William Tesillo (León)
- (Chile) Eduardo Vargas (UANL)
