= 2019 Campeón de Campeones =

- Match programme cover
- Event: 2019 Campeón de Campeones
| América | UANL |
| 0 | 0 |
- América won 6–5 on penalties
- Date: 14 July 2019
- Venue: Dignity Health Sports Park, Carson, California, United States
- Referee: Jorge Antonio Pérez (Veracruz)
- Attendance: 27,800

The 2019 Campeón de Campeones was the 47th edition of the Campeón de Campeones, an annual football super cup match. (Note: The edition number was calculated based on figures provided by Goal.com, with the first Campeón de Campeones having been held in 1941–42.) It took place on 14 July 2019 between América, the Apertura 2018 champion, and Tigres UANL, the Clausura 2019 champion, at the Dignity Health Sports Park (formerly known as the StubHub Center) in Carson, California, hosting for the fourth consecutive year. Like previous editions, the Campeón de Campeones was contested at a neutral venue in the United States and paired with the 2019 Supercopa MX.

América won the match 6–5 on penalties after a 0–0 draw to secure their sixth Campeón de Campeones title and qualified for the 2019 Campeones Cup, facing the MLS Cup 2018 champions Atlanta United on 14 August 2019 at Mercedes-Benz Stadium in Atlanta, Georgia.

== Match details ==
July 14, 2019
18:15 PT

| América | 0–0 | UANL |
|---|---|---|
| | Report |
Penalties
| Castillo (penalty scored); Aguilera (penalty scored); Valdez (penalty missed); Ménez (penalty scored); Martínez (penalty scored); Aguilar (penalty missed); Córdova (penalty missed); Uribe (penalty scored); Marchesín (penalty scored) | 6–5 | (penalty scored) Gignac; (penalty missed) Carioca; (penalty scored) Rodríguez; (penalty scored) Vargas; (penalty scored) Dueñas; (penalty missed) Ayala; (penalty missed) Pizarro; (penalty scored) Damm; (penalty missed) Aquino |

Dignity Health Sports Park, Carson
Attendance: 27,800
Referee: Jorge Antonio Pérez (Veracruz)

| América | UANL |

| GK | 1 | (Argentina) Agustín Marchesín |
| DF | 3 | (Mexico) Jorge Sánchez |
| DF | 19 | (Argentina) Emanuel Aguilera | (yellow card) 80' |
| DF | 18 | (Paraguay) Bruno Valdez |
| DF | 22 | (Mexico) Paul Aguilar (c) |
| MF | 17 | (Mexico) Sebastián Córdova |
| MF | 25 | (Mexico) Rubén González |
| MF | 8 | (Colombia) Mateus Uribe |
| FW | 11 | (Colombia) Andrés Ibargüen | | (substituted off) 69' |
| FW | 21 | (Mexico) Henry Martín | | (substituted off) 63' |
| FW | 30 | (Ecuador) Renato Ibarra | | (substituted off) 87' |
Substitutions:
| GK | 27 | (Mexico) Óscar Jiménez |
| DF | 2 | (Mexico) Carlos Vargas |
| DF | 28 | (Mexico) Luis Reyes |
| MF | 7 | (France) Jérémy Ménez | | (substituted on) 87' |
| MF | 23 | (Mexico) Antonio López |
| FW | 9 | (Colombia) Roger Martínez | | (substituted on) 69' |
| FW | 15 | (Chile) Nicolás Castillo | | (substituted on) 63' |
Manager:
(Mexico) Miguel Herrera

| GK | 1 | (Argentina) Nahuel Guzmán |
| DF | 29 | (Mexico) Jesús Dueñas | (yellow card) 65' |
| DF | 6 | (Mexico) Jorge Torres Nilo | (yellow card) 32' |
| DF | 4 | (Mexico) Hugo Ayala | (yellow card) 72' |
| DF | 28 | (Mexico) Luis Rodríguez |
| MF | 19 | (Argentina) Guido Pizarro (c) |
| MF | 5 | (Brazil) Rafael Carioca |
| MF | 20 | (Mexico) Javier Aquino |
| MF | 8 | (Argentina) Lucas Zelarayán | | (substituted off) 59' |
| MF | 23 | (Colombia) Luis Quiñones | | (substituted off) 76' |
| FW | 10 | (France) André-Pierre Gignac |
Substitutions:
| GK | 30 | (Mexico) Miguel Ortega |
| DF | 14 | (Mexico) Juan José Sánchez |
| DF | 27 | (Mexico) Jair Díaz |
| FF | 36 | (Mexico) Eduardo Tercero |
| MF | 25 | (Mexico) Jürgen Damm | | (substituted on) 76' |
| FW | 9 | (Chile) Eduardo Vargas | | (substituted on) 59' |
| FW | 13 | (Ecuador) Enner Valencia |
Manager:
(Brazil) Ricardo Ferretti

Assistant referees:
Pablo Israel Hernández (Mexico City)
Michel Alejandro Morales (Mexico City)
Fourth official:
Diego Montaño Robles (Jalisco)
