= Cecilio Domínguez =

Paraguayan footballer (born 1994)

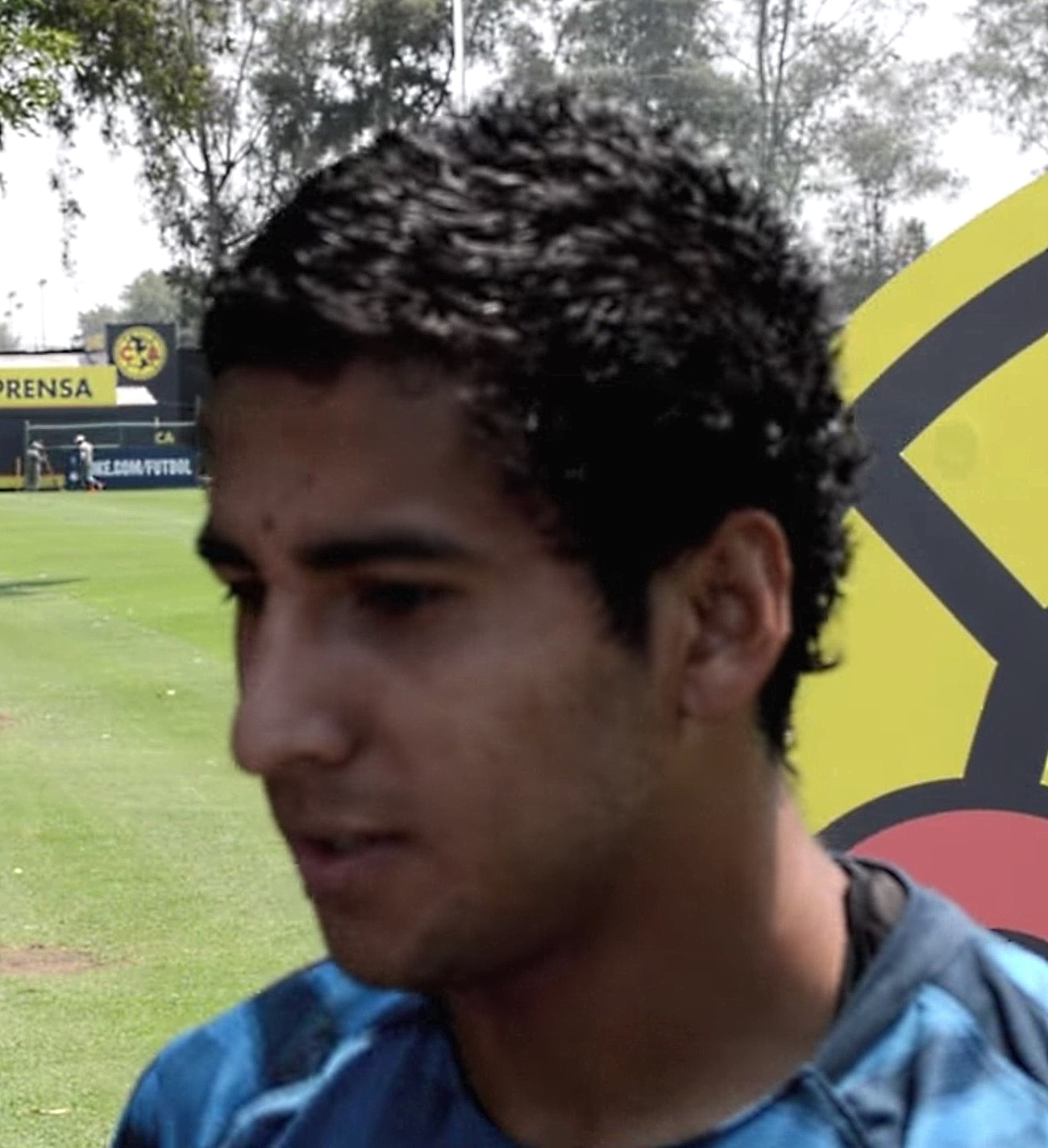
- Domínguez with América in 2017

Personal information
- Full name: Cecilio Andrés Domínguez Ruiz
- Date of birth: 11 August 1994 (age 32)
- Place of birth: Asunción, Paraguay
- Height: 1.77 m (5 ft 10 in)
- Position: Winger

Team information
- Current team: Cerro Porteño
- Number: 10

Youth career
- Sol de América

Senior career*
Years	Team	Apps	(Gls)
2011–2014	Sol de América	89	(11)
2014	→ Nacional (loan)	0	(0)
2015–2017	Cerro Porteño	69	(25)
2017–2019	América	58	(13)
2019–2020	Independiente	29	(3)
2020–2022	Austin FC	38	(9)
2020	→ Guaraní (loan)	14	(4)
2022–2023	Santos Laguna	15	(0)
2023–	Cerro Porteño	63	(20)

International career^{‡}
2010	Paraguay U17	9	(2)
2012–2013	Paraguay U20	20	(9)
2013–	Paraguay	17	(0)
- * Club domestic league appearances and goals as of 12 August 2025 ‡ National team caps and goals as of 24 August 2020

Cecilio Andrés Domínguez Ruiz (born 11 August 1994) is a Paraguayan professional footballer who plays as a winger for Paraguayan Primera División club Cerro Porteño and the Paraguay national team.

== Club career ==
=== Sol de América ===
Born in Asunción, Domínguez was a Sol de América youth graduate. On 20 November 2011, aged 17, he made his first team – and Primera División – debut, coming on as a late substitute in a 2–1 home win against Guaraní.

On 18 December 2011, in only his second appearance, he scored his professional goal by netting a last-minute equalizer in a 2–2 home draw against Cerro Porteño. He then became a regular starter from the 2012 season onwards.

On 1 July 2014, Domínguez was loaned to Nacional for the remainder of the 2014 Copa Libertadores. On 15 August, after the club was knocked out, he returned to his parent club, having only made two appearances.

=== Cerro Porteño ===
On 20 December 2014, Domínguez moved to Cerro Porteño for a US$ 750,000 fee for 50% of his federative rights. Regularly used, he scored a career-best 19 goals during the 2016 campaign; highlights included braces against Deportivo Capiatá (3–2 and 2–1 home wins), River Plate (3–2 away win) and former side Nacional (6–1 away win).

He also had a great Copa Sudamericana campaign, where he scored six goals in seven matches. His tally began with a hat trick against Independiente Santa Fe in the round of 16, two goals in the quarter finals first leg against Independiente Medellín, and a goal in the semi-finals against eventual winners Atlético Nacional, finishing tied for the golden boot with Miguel Borja.

=== América ===
On 14 January 2017, Mexican side Club América signed Domínguez on a four-year contract. He made his debut abroad fourteen days later, starting and scoring the only goal of the match in a Liga MX home win against Veracruz.

On 29 July 2017, Domínguez scored a brace in a 2–0 away win against Pachuca.

=== Independiente ===
On 24 January 2019, Domínguez joined Argentine club Independiente on a deal worth US$6 million, becoming the club's all-time record signing.

=== Austin FC ===
On 24 August 2020, Domínguez was announced as the first Designated Player of the newly formed MLS franchise Austin FC, set to make its competitive debut in 2021. On 31 August 2020, it was announced that Domínguez would spend the remainder of the season on loan with Guaraní, returning to Paraguay after three years. He left the club in December 2020 after his loan concluded and joined Austin FC for their inaugural season.

On 24 April 2021, Domínguez scored two goals for Austin against the Colorado Rapids in the club's first ever victory.

Domínguez started the 2022 season off strong with two goals in his first four games, but was sidelined when the MLS suspended him on April, starting an investigation into an off-field incident regarding domestic violence. On May 4, he was reinstated into the Austin FC squad and began training with the rest of the team. However, on 23 July 2022, the club announced that they had reached an agreement with Domínguez to terminate his contract.

== International career ==
After playing for Paraguay at under-17 and under-20 levels, Domínguez was first called by the full side on 2 October 2014, for friendlies with South Korea and China. He made his full international debut eight days later, replacing Derlis González in a 2–0 loss against the former in Cheonan.

== Career statistics ==
=== Club ===
As of 1 December 2023

Appearances and goals by club, season and competition
Club	Season	League			Cup		Continental		Other		Total	
Club	Season	Division	Apps	Goals	Apps	Goals	Apps	Goals	Apps	Goals	Apps	Goals
Sol de América	2011	Paraguayan Primera División	2	1	—		—		—		2	1
Sol de América	2012	Paraguayan Primera División	24	2	—		—		—		24	2
Sol de América	2013	Paraguayan Primera División	25	5	—		—		—		25	5
Sol de América	2014	Paraguayan Primera División	38	3	—		—		—		38	3
Sol de América	Total		89	11	0	0	0	0	0	0	89	11
Nacional (loan)	2014	Paraguayan Primera División	0	0	—		2 (Note: Appearances in Copa Libertadores)	0	—		2	0
Cerro Porteño	2015	Paraguayan Primera División	37	6	—		2	1	—		39	7
Cerro Porteño	2016	Paraguayan Primera División	32	19	—		10 (Note: Three appearances and one goal in Copa Libertadores, seven appearances and six goals in Copa Sudamericana)	7	—		42	26
Cerro Porteño	Total		69	25	0	0	12	8	0	0	81	33
América	2016–17	Liga MX	6	3	2	0	—		—		8	3
América	2017–18	Liga MX	33	8	5	0	4 (Note: Appearances in CONCACAF Champions League)	3	—		42	11
América	2018–19	Liga MX	19	2	4	4	—		—		23	6
América	Total		58	13	11	4	4	3	0	0	73	20
Independiente	2018–19	Argentine Primera División	8	1	1	1	4 (Note: Appearances in Copa Sudamericana)	3	2 (Note: Appearances in Copa de la Superliga)	1	15	6
Independiente	2019–20	Argentine Primera División	21	2	1	0	2	0	0	0	24	2
Independiente	Total		29	3	2	1	6	3	2	1	39	8
Guaraní (loan)	2020	Paraguayan Primera División	14	4	—		6	2	—		20	6
Austin FC	2021	MLS	34	7	—		—		—		34	7
Austin FC	2022	MLS	4	2	—		—		—		4	2
Austin FC	Total		38	9	0	0	0	0	0	0	38	9
América	2022–23	Liga MX	16	0	—		—		—		16	0
Cerro Porteño	2023	Paraguayan Primera División	19	6	1	0	—		—		20	6
Career total			332	71	14	5	28	16	2	1	378	93

=== International ===
As of match played 24 August 2020

Appearances and goals by national team and year
National team	Year	Apps	Goals
Paraguay	2014	2	0
Paraguay	2015	1	0
Paraguay	2016	2	0
Paraguay	2017	4	0
Paraguay	2018	2	0
Paraguay	2019	6	0
Total		17	0

== Honours ==
Cerro Porteño

- Paraguayan Primera División: 2015 Apertura

América

- Liga MX: Apertura 2018

Individual

- Paraguayan Primera División Top Scorer: 2016 Clausura
