= Luis Reyes (Mexican footballer) =

Mexican footballer (born 1991)

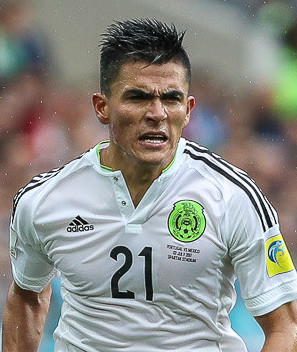
- Reyes with Mexico at the 2017 FIFA Confederations Cup

Personal information
- Full name: Luis Ricardo Reyes Moreno
- Date of birth: 3 April 1991 (age 35)
- Place of birth: Monterrey, Nuevo León, Mexico
- Height: 1.84 m (6 ft 0 in)
- Position: Left-back

Team information
- Current team: Monterrey
- Number: 21

Youth career
- 2008–2016: Atlas

Senior career*
Years	Team	Apps	(Gls)
2013–2018	Atlas	59	(0)
2014	→ Unión de Curtidores (loan)	15	(10)
2014	→ UdeC (loan)	10	(1)
2015	→ Altamira (loan)	10	(2)
2015–2016	→ Tampico Madero (loan)	28	(5)
2018–2020	América	31	(0)
2019–2020	→ Atlético San Luis (loan)	27	(1)
2021–2022	→ Atlas (loan)	51	(4)
2022–2024	Atlas	73	(4)
2025–	Monterrey	32	(0)

International career
2017–2022	Mexico	9	(0)
- * Club domestic league appearances and goals as of 21 November 2026

Luis Ricardo Reyes Moreno (born 3 April 1991), also known as El Hueso, is a Mexican professional footballer who plays as a left-back for Liga MX club Monterrey.

== Club career ==
=== Atlas ===
Reyes began his career at Atlas playing in their youth academy since 2008. After various loan spells to second and third-tier teams in Mexico. Reyes made his first team debut in the first division with Atlas in a match against Toluca on 16 July 2016. After successful performances with the first team, he cemented his spot as a first-choice left-back, his performances during the Clausura 2017 season lead him to be included in the best XI of the league as well as a call-up to the national team.

=== América ===
On 18 May 2018, Reyes joined América.

== International career ==
Reyes made his senior national team debut against Iceland on 8 February 2017, merely 7 months after playing in the third tier of Mexican football. Reyes was included in the final roster for those participating in the 2017 FIFA Confederations Cup held in Russia after only four appearances with the national team. After his participation in the Confederations Cup, he was also called to play in the 2017 CONCACAF Gold Cup.

== Career statistics ==
=== International ===
As of match played on 31 August 2022

National team	Year	Apps	Goals
Mexico	2017	8	0
Mexico	2022	1	0
Total		9	0

== Honours ==
América

- Liga MX: Apertura 2018
- Copa MX: Clausura 2019
- Campeón de Campeones: 2019

Atlas

- Liga MX: Apertura 2021, Clausura 2022
- Campeón de Campeones: 2022

Individual

- Liga MX Best XI: Clausura 2017, Clausura 2022
- Liga MX All-Star: 2022
