= Cristian Insaurralde =

Argentine footballer (born 1991)

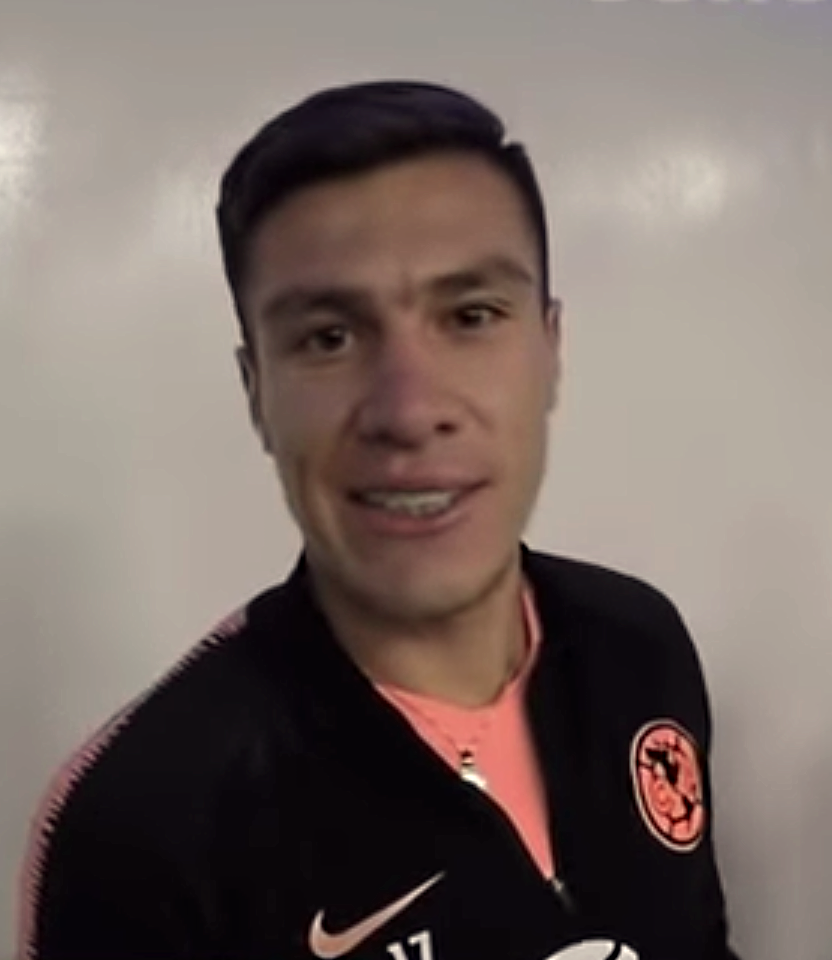
- Insaurralde with América in 2018

Personal information
- Full name: Cristian Manuel Insaurralde
- Date of birth: 20 July 1991 (age 35)
- Place of birth: Resistencia, Chaco, Argentina
- Height: 1.79 m (5 ft 10 in)
- Position: Forward

Team information
- Current team: Cobreloa

Youth career
- 2011–2012: River Plate

Senior career*
Years	Team	Apps	(Gls)
2012–2013	River Plate	0	(0)
2012–2013	→ Quilmes (loan)	6	(0)
2013–2015	Sportivo Belgrano	68	(8)
2016–2019	O'Higgins	43	(18)
2017–2018	→ Cerro Porteño (loan)	25	(3)
2018–2019	→ América (loan)	6	(1)
2019–2022	Newell's Old Boys	10	(1)
2021	→ Unión Santa Fe (loan)	11	(1)
2022	Estudiantes RC	1	(0)
2022	Atenas	6	(0)
2023–	Cobreloa	47	(14)
2025	→ Unión La Calera (loan)	13	(2)
2025	→ Unión Española (loan)	13	(1)
- * Club domestic league appearances and goals as of 15 December 2025

Cristian Manuel Insaurralde (born 20 July 1991) is an Argentine professional footballer who plays as a forward for Chilean club Cobreloa.

== Career ==
In 2023, Insaurralde returned to Chile after playing for O'Higgins in 2016–17 and joined Cobreloa in the Primera B, winning the league title and getting promotion to the Chilean Primera División. After Cobreloa was relegated to the Primera B, he was loaned out to Unión La Calera for the 2025 season. In the second half of the same year, he switched to Unión Española.

== Honours ==
Cerro Porteño

- Paraguayan Primera División (1): 2017 Clausura

América

- Liga MX (1): 2018 Apertura
- Copa MX (1): 2019 Clausura

Cobreloa

- Primera B de Chile (2): 2023, 2026
