= Carlos Vargas (footballer) =

Mexican footballer (born 1999)

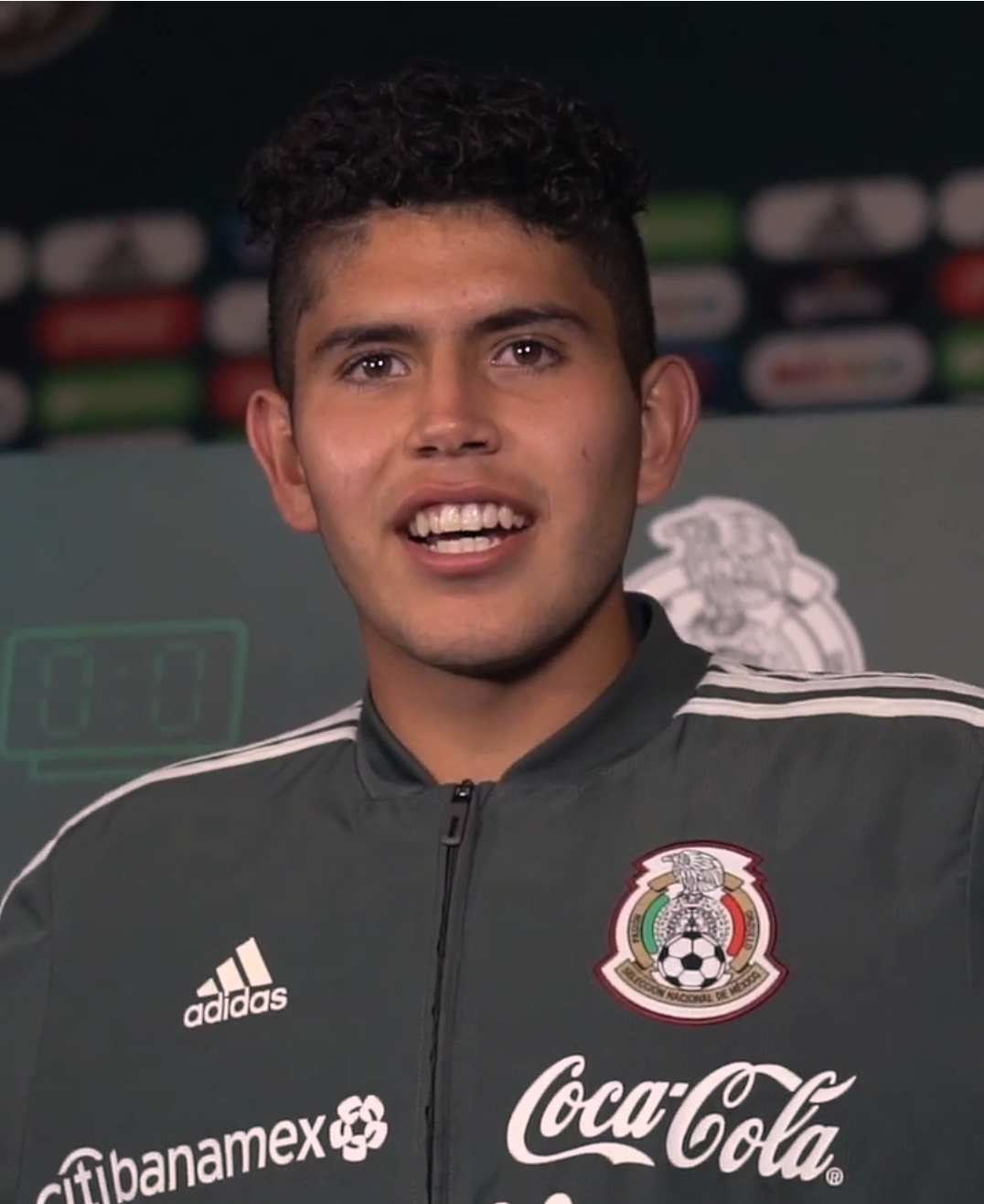
- Vargas in 2018

Personal information
- Full name: Carlos Alonso Vargas Tenorio
- Date of birth: 14 February 1999 (age 27)
- Place of birth: Ciudad Juárez, Chihuahua, Mexico
- Height: 1.92 m (6 ft 3 1/2 in)
- Position: Left-back

Team information
- Current team: Necaxa
- Number: 88

Youth career
- 2015–2017: Tijuana

Senior career*
Years	Team	Apps	(Gls)
2017	Tijuana	12	(0)
2017–2021	América	47	(0)
2020	→ Morelia (loan)	3	(1)
2020–2021	→ Mazatlán (loan)	21	(1)
2021–2022	Mazatlán	41	(0)
2023–2026	Cruz Azul	10	(0)
2026–	Necaxa	10	(0)

International career^{‡}
2018	Mexico U20	1	(0)
2018	Mexico U21	7	(0)
Medal record
Men's football
Representing Mexico
Toulon Tournament
Runner-up	2018 France	Team
- * Club domestic league appearances and goals as of 23 October 2026 ‡ National team caps and goals as of 7 November 2018

Carlos Alonso Vargas Tenorio (born 14 February 1999) is a Mexican professional footballer who plays as a left-back for Liga MX club Necaxa.

== Club career ==
=== Tijuana ===
In 2014, Vargas first joined Tijuana's youth academy. In 2017, first-team coach Miguel Herrera promoted 18 year-old Vargas to the team competing in that year's Clausura tournament.

On 17 March 2017, Vargas made his debut against Santos Laguna. He started the match and played all 90 minutes in a 1–1 draw. He made twelve appearances as Tijuana finished the tournament in first place and managed to reach the semifinals of the playoffs.

=== América ===
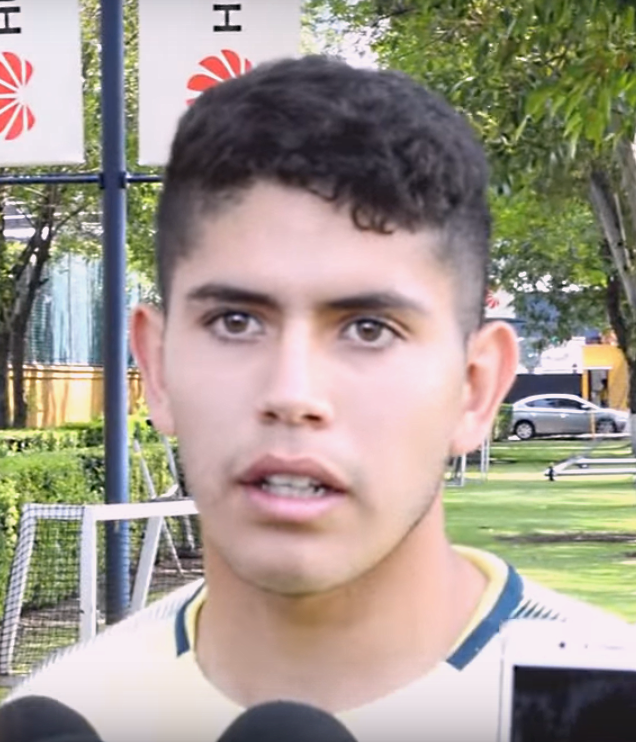
Carlos Vargas

In June 2017, Vargas joined América, reuniting with manager Miguel Herrera. He made his debut on 22 July against Querétaro. He started in the match which ended in a 0–1 defeat.

=== Cruz Azul ===
On 18 January 2023, Cruz Azul announced the signing of Vargas from Mazatlán. Vargas made his season debut on 4 February, against Tigres UANL and tore his right ACL in the 14th minute of the match.

=== Necaxa ===
On 24 June 2026, Vargas signed with Necaxa.

== International career ==
On 25 October 2018, Vargas was called up by Diego Ramírez to participate in the 2018 CONCACAF U-20 Championship. He would attain an injury during Mexico's first group stage match against Nicaragua and was subsequently ruled out for the rest of the tournament.

Vargas was included in the final roster that participated at the 2018 Toulon Tournament. He would go on to appear in all five matches, as Mexico would go to the final against England, where Mexico lost 1–2.

Vargas was included in the final roster that participated in the 2018 Central American and Caribbean Games. He appeared in two group stage matches as Mexico finished last in their group with one point.

== Style of play ==
Vargas is described as "quick in anticipating opponent's movements and strong in the air."

== Career statistics ==
=== Club ===
As of match played on 23 October 2026

Appearances and goals by club, season and competition
Club	Season	League			National Cup (Note: Includes Copa MX)		Continental (Note: All appearances in CONCACAF Champions League/Cup)		Other		Total	
Club	Season	Division	Apps	Goals	Apps	Goals	Apps	Goals	Apps	Goals	Apps	Goals
Tijuana	2016–17	Liga MX	12	0	4	0	—		—		16	0
América	2017–18	Liga MX	29	0	6	0	4	0	1 (Note: One appearance in Supercopa MX)	0	40	0
América	2018–19	Liga MX	10	0	12	0	—		—		22	0
América	2019–20	Liga MX	8	0	—		—		2 (Note: One appearance in Leagues Cup and one in Campeones Cup)	0	10	0
América	Total		47	0	18	0	4	0	3	0	72	0
Morelia (loan)	2019–20	Liga MX	3	1	4	0	—		—		7	1
Mazatlán (loan)	2020–21	Liga MX	21	1	—		—		2 (Note: Appearances in Copa GNP por México)	0	23	1
Mazatlán	2021–22	Liga MX	28	0	—		—		—		28	0
Mazatlán	2022–23	Liga MX	13	0	—		—		3 (Note: Appearances in Copa Sky por México)	0	16	0
Mazatlán	Total		41	0	—		—		3	0	44	0
Cruz Azul	2022–23	Liga MX	1	0	—		—		—		1	0
Cruz Azul	2023–24	Liga MX	4	0	—		—		—		4	0
Cruz Azul	2024–25	Liga MX	5	0	—		—		—		5	0
Cruz Azul	Total		10	0	—		—		—		10	0
Necaxa	2026–27	Liga MX	10	0	—		—		1 (Note: Appearance in Leagues Cup)	0	11	0
Career total			144	2	26	0	4	0	9	0	183	2

== Honours ==
América

- Liga MX: Apertura 2018
- Copa MX: Clausura 2019
- Campeón de Campeones: 2019

Cruz Azul

- CONCACAF Champions Cup: 2025
