= Renato Ibarra =

Ecuadorian footballer (born 1991)

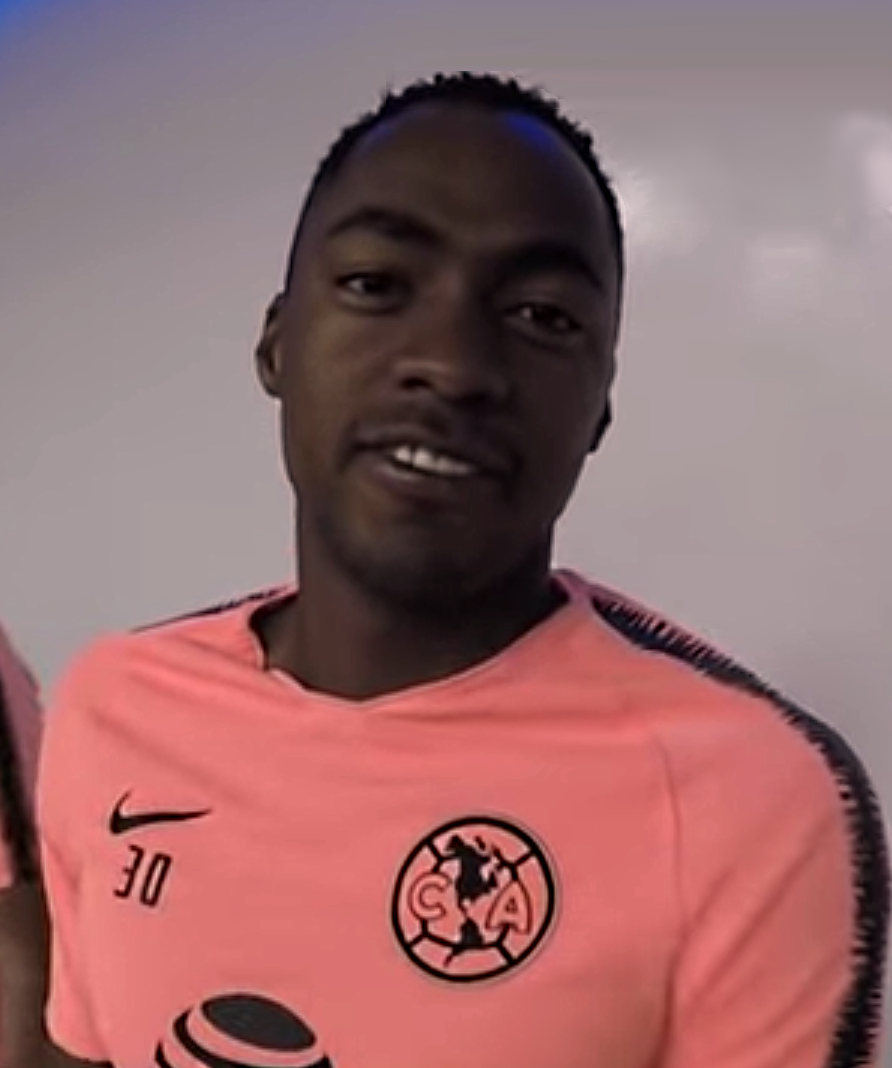
- Ibarra with América in 2018

Personal information
- Full name: Alex Renato Ibarra Mina
- Date of birth: 20 January 1991 (age 35)
- Place of birth: Ambuquí, Ecuador
- Height: 1.75 m (5 ft 9 in)
- Position: Right winger

Team information
- Current team: Mushuc Runa
- Number: 30

Youth career
- El Nacional

Senior career*
Years	Team	Apps	(Gls)
2007–2011	El Nacional	31	(3)
2011–2016	Vitesse	129	(9)
2016–2023	América	120	(13)
2020–2021	→ Atlas (loan)	29	(4)
2022	→ Tijuana (loan)	27	(2)
2023	→ L.D.U. Quito (loan)	26	(3)
2024–2025	Independiente del Valle	51	(7)
2026–	Mushuc Runa	2	(0)

International career^{‡}
2011	Ecuador U20	9	(0)
2011–2020	Ecuador	46	(1)
- * Club domestic league appearances and goals as of 19 August 2025 ‡ National team caps and goals as of 20 November 2019 (UTC)

Alex Renato Ibarra Mina (born 20 January 1991) is an Ecuadorian professional footballer who plays as a right winger for Ecuadorian club Mushuc Runa.

== Club career ==
=== El Nacional ===
He had been playing throughout his youth at the Ecuadorian team El Nacional. Ibarra's debut came in on 17 May 2009 in a 3–0 win over CD Olmedo. His first career goal and first goal for El Nacional came on 9 March 2011, a 30-meter long shot that was to be vital goal in a 1–0 win over Independiente Jose Teran. He would go on to score 2 more goals for El "Nacho", against Deportivo Cuenca and Imbabura. A great showing in the Ecuadorian Serie A and at the 2011 FIFA U-20 World Cup have gained him interest from several European clubs, such as Chelsea and Vitesse Arnhem, the latter signing him in the summer of 2011. He would finish his career for El Nacional having played 31 games and scoring 3 goals.

=== Vitesse ===
On 8 July 2011 Vitesse acquired Renato Ibarra's services for a contract of three years at the club. His debut came on 27 November 2011 in a 0–0 draw versus FC Twente. He scored his debut goal for Vitesse on 16 March 2012, in a 2–0 win against SC Heracles. His second goal came on 15 April 2012, in a 1–0 victory over ADO Den Haag. His third and final goal of the season came against RKC Waalwijk on 20 May. He would finish his debut season with 3 goals in 23 league games played, and became part of the squad's starting line-up.

Renato's season debut was on 18 August 2012 in a 1–0 win over FC Zwolle, where he scored the only goal. On 3 November, Renato curved a beautiful cross for Wilfried Bony's second goal in a 2–0 away win against AFC Ajax, ending their unbeaten run in all competitions. In just several games he's become an influential winger for Vitesse, assisting Wilfried Bony with great accurate crosses. On 19 December, Renato scored a double in Vitesse's historic 10–1 cup-match win over ADO '20. On 27 January 2013, Renato scored the winning goal in a vital and thrilling 3–2 home win against Dutch giants AFC Ajax. On 6 April, Renato scored his 3rd goal of the season, in a 3–0 home win over NAC Breda, dribbling past 3 defenders to score the 2nd goal of the match. Renato finished the season having scored a total of 5 goals in all competitions for Vitesse.

Renato scored his first goal of the season on 4 August, in his season debut match, winning 3–1 against Heracles at home stadium.

=== América ===
On 10 June 2016, Ibarra joined Mexican side Club América in a reported US$2 million deal, signing a three-year contract. Ibarra went on to win the Apertura 2018 and reaching the Apertura 2016 and 2019 finals. On 12 March 2020, América issued a statement announcing Ibarra would no longer be part of the squad due to his charges of domestic violence.

==== Loan to Atlas ====
On 3 July 2020, Ibarra joined Atlas on a one-year loan.

=== Return to América ===
For the Apertura 2021 tournament, América brought back Ibarra to strengthen their squad. Nonetheless, he only played one game after picking an injury that required surgery. Ibarra was sidelined after refusing to follow medical advice from the club.

== International career ==
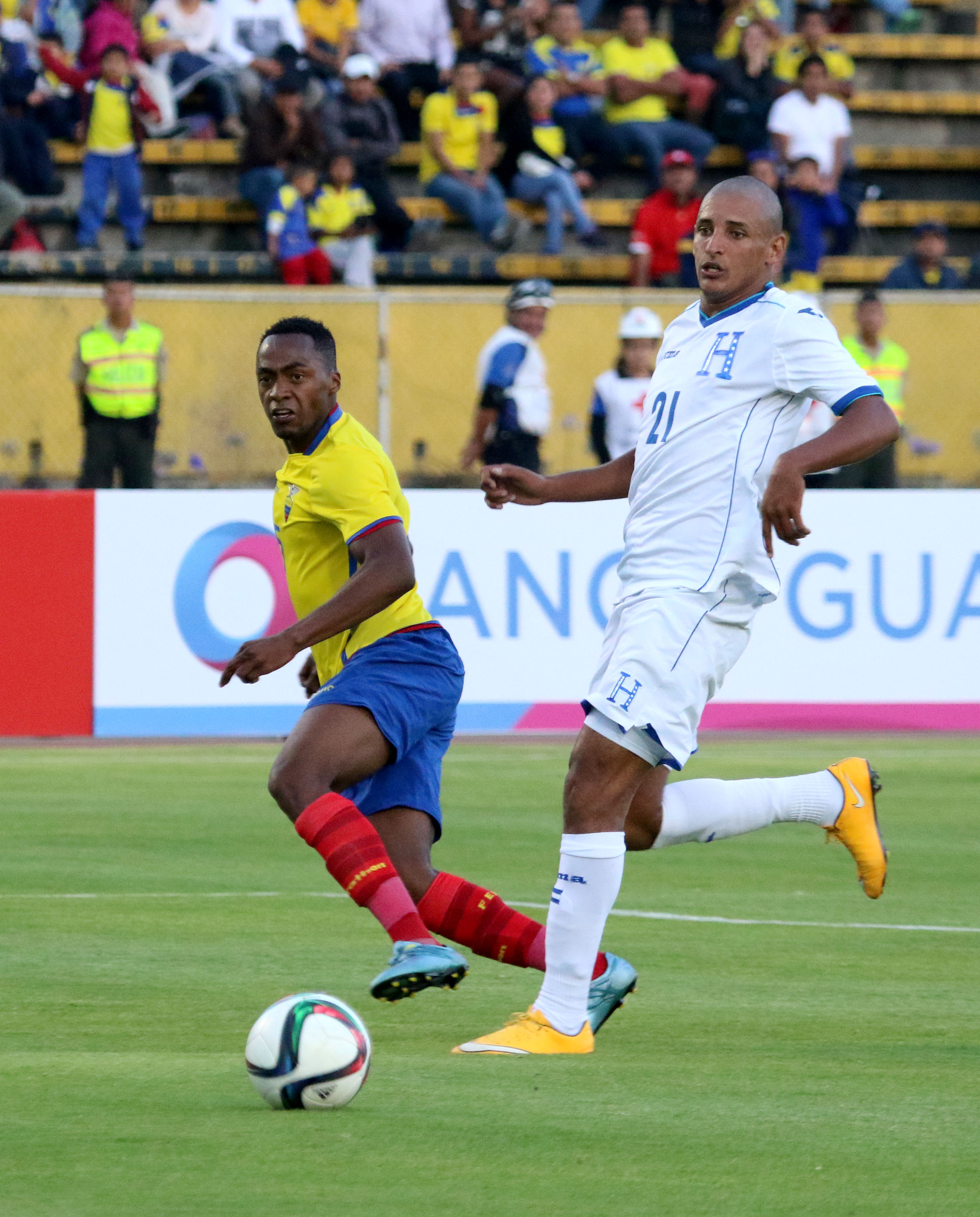
Ibarra (left) playing for Ecuador in 2015.

Ibarra was part of the Ecuadorian squad which played at the 2011 South American U-20 Championship, qualifying 4th for the 2011 FIFA U-20 World Cup. The squad went on to reach the round-of-16, being defeated by France.

On 20 April 2011, Ibarra made his debut for the senior national team in a friendly match against Argentina.

He also participated with the national team at the 2014 FIFA World Cup and 2015 Copa América tournaments. Ibarra was included in the provisional squad for the 2016 Copa América Centenario, but was left out of the final 23-man squad.

== Career statistics ==
As of match played 13 May 2019.

Club	Season	League			Cup		Continental		Other		Total	
Club	Season	Division	Apps	Goals	Apps	Goals	Apps	Goals	Apps	Goals	Apps	Goals
El Nacional	2009	Serie A	3	0	0	0	0	0	—		3	0
El Nacional	2010	Serie A	11	0	0	0	—		—		11	0
El Nacional	2011	Serie A	17	3	0	0	—		—		17	3
El Nacional	Total		31	3	0	0	0	0	—		31	3
Vitesse	2011–12	Eredivisie	23	3	1	0	—		4 (Note: Appearance(s) in Eredivisie European play-offs)	1	28	4
Vitesse	2012–13	Eredivisie	32	3	3	2	4 (Note: Appearance(s) in UEFA Europa League)	0	—		39	5
Vitesse	2013–14	Eredivisie	33	1	3	0	2	0	1	0	39	1
Vitesse	2014–15	Eredivisie	25	2	3	1	—		2	0	30	3
Vitesse	2015–16	Eredivisie	16	0	1	0	0	0	—		17	0
Vitesse	Total		129	9	11	3	6	0	7	1	153	13
América	2016–17	Liga MX	30	1	8	2	1 (Note: Appearance(s) in FIFA Club World Cup)	0	—		38	3
América	2017–18	Liga MX	30	4	3	0	3 (Note: Appearance(s) in CONCACAF Champions League)	1	1 (Note: Appearance(s) in Supercopa MX)	0	37	5
América	2018–19	Liga MX	36	3	9	0	0	0	—		45	3
América	Total		96	8	20	2	4	1	1	0	121	11
Career total			256	20	31	5	10	1	8	1	305	27

=== International goals ===
Scores and results list Ecuador's goal tally first.

No.	Date	Venue	Opponent	Score	Result	Competition
1.	7 September 2018	Red Bull Arena, Harrison, United States	Jamaica	2–0	2–0	Friendly

== Honours ==
América

- Liga MX: Apertura 2018
- Copa MX: Clausura 2019
- Campeón de Campeones: 2019

LDU Quito

- Liga Pro Serie A : 2023
- Copa Sudamericana : 2023
