= Nicolás Benedetti =

Colombian footballer (born 1997)

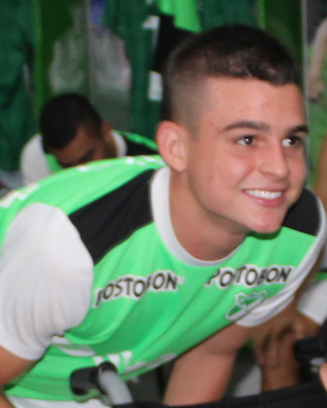
- Benedetti with Deportivo Cali

Personal information
- Full name: Nicolás Benedetti Roa
- Date of birth: 25 April 1997 (age 29)
- Place of birth: Cali, Colombia
- Height: 1.77 m (5 ft 10 in)
- Position: Attacking midfielder

Team information
- Current team: Deportivo Cali
- Number: 21

Senior career*
Years	Team	Apps	(Gls)
2015–2019	Deportivo Cali	119	(17)
2019–2022	América	40	(3)
2022	→ Mazatlán (loan)	33	(5)
2023–2025	Mazatlán	56	(13)
2026	Las Palmas	5	(0)
2026–	Deportivo Cali	0	(0)

International career^{‡}
2020	Colombia U23	7	(1)
2018	Colombia	1	(0)
- * Club domestic league appearances and goals as of 3 June 2026 ‡ National team caps and goals as of 29 January 2019 (UTC)

Nicolás Benedetti Roa (born 25 April 1997) is a Colombian professional footballer who plays as an attacking midfielder for Deportivo Cali.

== Club career ==
Benedetti began his professional career with Deportivo Cali, making his debut as an 80th‑minute substitute against Boyacá Chicó on 15 July 2015.

Four years later, in January 2019, he moved to Mexico to join Club América. After six seasons with the team, Benedetti was loaned to Mazatlán in January 2022, a deal that became permanent by December of that year.

In December 2025, he signed a short‑term contract with Spanish side Las Palmas.

He returned to Deportivo Cali in July 2026.

== International career ==
Benedetti was named in Colombia's provisional squad for Copa América Centenario but was cut from the final squad.

== Honours ==
América

- Copa MX: Clausura 2019
