= Luis Enrique Santander =

Mexican football referee (born 1983)

- Full name: Luis Enrique Santander Aguirre
- Born: January 24, 1983 (age 43); Irapuato, Guanajuato, Mexico

Domestic
| Years | League | Role |
| 2006–2012 | Liga de Ascenso | Referee |
| 2011–present | Liga MX | Referee |

International
| Years | League | Role |
| 2015–present | FIFA listed | Referee |

Luis Enrique Santander Aguirre (born 24 January 1983) is a Mexican professional football referee. He has been a full international for FIFA since 2015.

== Career ==
Refereeing since 2004, Santander made his official debut on 10 September 2006 in a match between Salamanca and Santos Laguna 1a. 'A'. After four years of refereeing in the youth levels, Santander would make his First Division debut as a fourth official on 29 January 2011 in a match between Atlante and Puebla at Estadio Andrés Quintana Roo. The following year on 21 July 2012, Santander made his First Division debut as a central referee in an Apertura 2012 match between Cruz Azul and Morelia at Estadio Azul.

Santander officiated his first international game on 31 March 2015, a friendly between Panama and Costa Rica at Estadio Rommel Fernández in Panama City.

On 9 July 2014 Santander was the referee for the first leg of the 2014 Supercopa MX between Morelia and Tigres UANL at Estadio Morelos. Santander was the referee for the Clausura 2015 Copa MX Final between Puebla and Guadalajara at Estadio Universitario BUAP, the first major final he officiated. The following year, Santander was the referee for the first leg of the Clausura 2016 final between Pachuca and Monterrey at Estadio Hidalgo, the first Liga MX final he officiated.

Santander has since officiated three other Liga MX finals: Guadalajara vs Tigres UANL (Clausura 2017), América vs Monterrey (Apertura 2019), and Atlas vs León (Apertura 2021).
