= César Arturo Ramos =

Mexican football referee (born 1983)

César Ramos
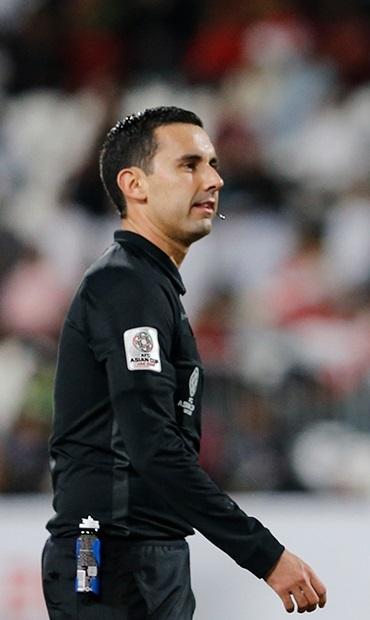
- Ramos refereeing at 2019 AFC Asian Cup
- Full name: César Arturo Ramos Palazuelos
- Born: 15 December 1983 (age 42); Culiacán, Sinaloa, Mexico

Domestic
Years	League	Role
2006–2011	Ascenso MX	Referee
2011–present	Liga MX	Referee

International
Years	League	Role
2014–present	FIFA listed	Referee

César Arturo Ramos Palazuelos (born 15 December 1983) is a Mexican professional football referee. His mother was born in France and his father is of Portuguese descent. Both his parents immigrated to Mexico a year before he was born. He has been a full international for FIFA since 2014. He refereed matches in the CONCACAF Champions League, the 2018 FIFA World Cup the 2019 AFC Asian Cup, the 2022 FIFA World Cup and 2026 FIFA World Cup, and the 2024 Copa América.

== Refereeing career ==
Ramos made his debut on 28 October 2006, in a Primera División A match between Zacatepec and Santos Laguna 1a. 'A'. He made his First Division debut as a fourth official on 15 January 2011, in a match between San Luis and Puebla in San Luis Potosí. Later that year, he made his First Division debut as a central referee in a match between Monterrey and Tijuana in Monterrey.

The first player Ramos booked in the First Division was Fernando Arce while the first player he sent off was Mariano Trujillo after he booked him twice in 15 minutes.

He refereed the 2017 FIFA Club World Cup Final between Real Madrid and Gremio.

He was the only Mexican center referee assigned to referee at the 2018 FIFA World Cup.

In 2019, Ramos participated in a referee exchange program between the AFC and CONCACAF, where he would referee in the 2019 AFC Asian Cup and Abdulrahman Al-Jassim of Qatar would referee at the 2019 CONCACAF Gold Cup.

He refereed the 2022 FIFA World Cup semi-final match between France and Morocco on 14 December.

He refereed the 2024 Copa América match between Brazil and Costa Rica on 24 June 2024.

He refereed the 2026 FIFA World Cup match between Brazil and Scotland on 24 June 2026, and has since been target of criticism on social media for his decisions regarding foul play and goal disallowment in the match.

== Record ==
=== FIFA World Cup ===
2018 FIFA World Cup – Russia
Date	Match	Venue	Round
17 June 2018	Brazil – Switzerland	Rostov-on-Don	Group stage
24 June 2018	Poland – Colombia	Kazan	Group stage
30 June 2018	Uruguay – Portugal	Sochi	Round of 16

2022 FIFA World Cup – Qatar
Date	Match	Venue	Round
22 November 2022	Denmark – Tunisia	Al Rayyan	Group stage
27 November 2022	Belgium – Morocco	Doha	Group stage
6 December 2022	Portugal – Switzerland	Lusail	Round of 16
14 December 2022	France – Morocco	Al Khor	Semi-finals

2026 FIFA World Cup – Canada/United States/Mexico
Date	Match	Venue	Round
15 June 2026	Iran – New Zealand	Inglewood	Group stage
25 June 2026	Scotland – Brazil	Miami	Group stage

=== AFC Asian Cup ===
2019 AFC Asian Cup – United Arab Emirates
Date	Match	Venue	Round
10 January 2019	India – United Arab Emirates	Abu Dhabi	Group stage
15 January 2019	Australia – Syria	Al Ain	Group stage
20 January 2019	Iran – Oman	Abu Dhabi	Round of 16
29 January 2019	Qatar – United Arab Emirates	Abu Dhabi	Semi-finals

=== Copa América ===
2024 Copa América – United States
Date	Match	Venue	Round
24 June 2024	Brazil – Costa Rica	Inglewood	Group stage
29 June 2024	Argentina – Peru	Miami Gardens	Group stage
10 July 2024	Uruguay – Colombia	Charlotte	Semi-finals

Preceded by (Zambia) Janny Sikazwe	FIFA Club World Cup Final Referee; 2017	Succeeded by (United States) Jair Marrufo
