= Emanuel Aguilera =

Argentine footballer (born 1989)

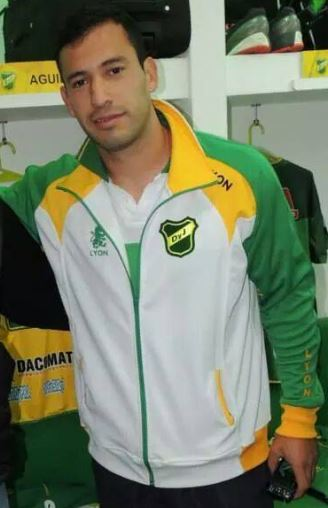
- Aguilera with Defensa y Justicia in 2014

Personal information
- Full name: Víctor Emanuel Aguilera
- Date of birth: 11 June 1989 (age 37)
- Place of birth: Mendoza, Argentina
- Height: 1.87 m (6 ft 2 in)
- Position: Centre-back

Team information
- Current team: San Martín SJ

Senior career*
Years	Team	Apps	(Gls)
2007–2010	Deportivo Guaymallén	70	(4)
2010–2014	Godoy Cruz	10	(0)
2012–2014	→ Defensa y Justicia (loan)	57	(5)
2014–2016	Independiente	22	(1)
2016–2017	Tijuana	39	(0)
2018–2022	América	128	(18)
2022–2023	Atlas	22	(0)
2023–2024	Tigre	19	(0)
2024–2026	Defensa y Justicia	51	(0)
2026–	San Martín SJ	2	(0)
- * Club domestic league appearances and goals as of 17:16, 13 March 2026 (UTC)

Víctor Emanuel Aguilera (born 11 June 1989) is an Argentine professional footballer who plays as a centre-back for San Martín SJ.

== Career ==
Aguilera began his professional career in 2007 at the age of 18 with Deportivo Guaymallén, with whom he played in over 70 matches. In 2010 he signed with Godoy Cruz of the Primera División, though was loaned out to second-division side Defensa y Justicia. He gained promotion with the club and went on to play in 57 matches and scoring five goals. He returned to Godoy Cruz in 2014, though only managing four appearances.

In 2014, Aguilera joined Independiente for a reported sum of US$300,000 for 50 percent of the player's economic rights. He managed 22 league appearances with Independiente, and made his Copa Libertadores debut with the club.

On 24 June 2016, it was confirmed Aguilera had joined Mexican club Tijuana. The fee was reported to be in the region of US$2 million, with Tijuana obtaining 100 percent of his economic rights. He made his Liga MX debut on 15 June against Monarcas Morelia.

On 13 December 2017, Aguilera joined Club América, reuniting with former Tijuana manager Miguel Herrera.

== Honours ==
América

- Liga MX: Apertura 2018
- Copa MX: Clausura 2019
- Campeón de Campeones: 2019

Atlas

- Liga MX: Clausura 2022
- Campeón de Campeones: 2022
