= Andrés Ibargüen (footballer) =

Colombian footballer (born 1992)

Personal information
- Full name: Andrés Felipe Ibargüen García
- Date of birth: 7 May 1992 (age 34)
- Place of birth: Cali, Colombia
- Height: 1.75 m (5 ft 9 in)
- Position: Winger

Team information
- Current team: Once Caldas
- Number: 92

Senior career*
Years	Team	Apps	(Gls)
2011–2012	Cortuluá	19	(0)
2013–2014	Bogotá	53	(7)
2014–2015	Deportes Tolima	63	(11)
2016–2017	Atlético Nacional	47	(12)
2017	Racing Club	11	(3)
2018–2021	América	81	(18)
2021	Santos Laguna	21	(0)
2022	Deportes Tolima	30	(6)
2023	Independiente Medellín	29	(0)
2024	Deportivo Pereira	30	(5)
2025	Atlético Bucaramanga	3	(0)
2025–	Once Caldas	8	(0)

International career^{‡}
2019	Colombia	1	(0)
- * Club domestic league appearances and goals as of 12 December 2025 ‡ National team caps and goals as of 15 October 2019

Andrés Felipe Ibargüen García (born 7 May 1992) is a Colombian professional footballer who plays as a winger for Categoría Primera A club Once Caldas. He is sometimes referred to as El Milagro Ibargüen (The Miracle) a name given to him by Colombian commentators during his time at Atlético Nacional.

== Club career ==
On 5 January 2018, Ibargüen signed for Liga MX side Club América on a 4 million dollar transaction. His debut occurred on 21 January 2018 in a match against Pumas UNAM that ended in a 0–0 draw. He scored his first goal on 6 March 2018 in a match against Tauro FC that ended in a 4–0 win in the quarterfinal stages of the CONCACAF Champions League.

== Statistics ==
=== Club performance ===
Club performance		League		Cup		Continental		Other		Total	
Club	Season	Apps	Goals	Apps	Goals	Apps	Goals	Apps	Goals	Apps	Goals
Colombia		Categoría Primera A		Copa Colombia		Continental^{1}		Other^{2}		Total	
Atlético; Nacional	2016	32	9	3	1	16	0	1	0	52	1
Atlético; Nacional	Total	32	9	3	1	16	0	1	0	52	1
Career total		32	9	3	1	16	0	1	0	52	1

Statistics accurate as of last match played on 26 November 2016.

^{1} Includes cup competitions such as Copa Libertadores and Copa Sudamericana.

^{2} Includes Superliga Colombiana matches.

== Honours ==
Atlético Nacional

- Superliga Colombiana (1): 2016
- Copa Libertadores (1): 2016
- Recopa Sudamericana: 2017

Deportes Tolima

- Copa Colombia (1): 2014

América

- Liga MX: Apertura 2018
- Copa MX: Clausura 2019
- Campeón de Campeones: 2019
