= Bruno Valdez (footballer, born 1992) =

Paraguayan footballer

Bruno Amílcar Valdez
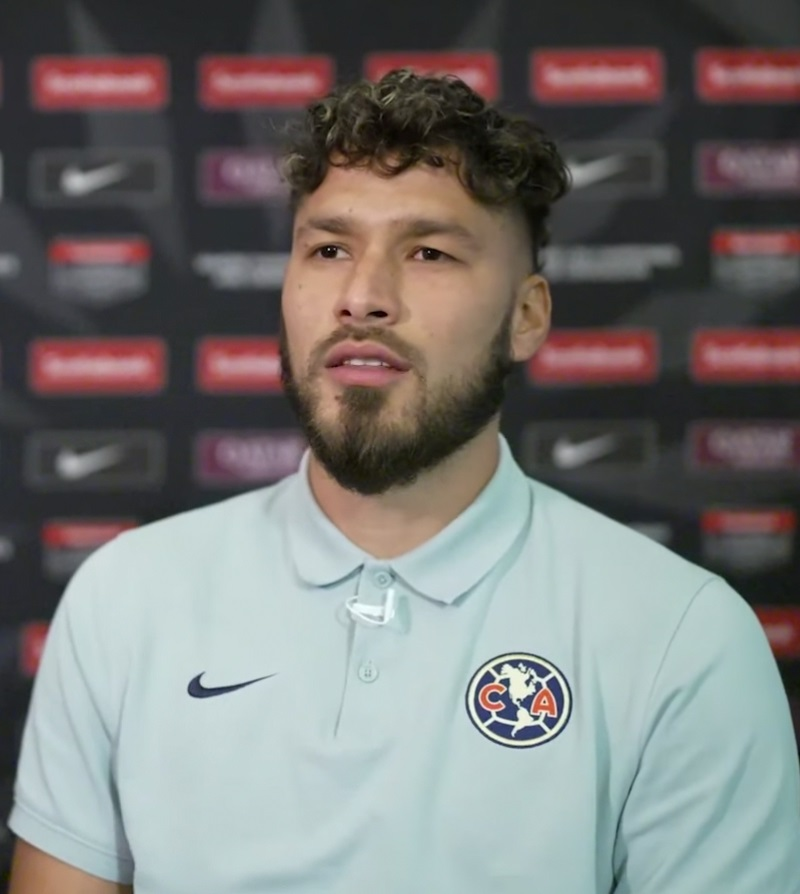
- Valdez with América in 2021

Personal information
- Full name: Bruno Amílcar Valdez Rojas
- Date of birth: 6 October 1992 (age 34)
- Place of birth: Fernando de la Mora, Paraguay
- Height: 1.83 m (6 ft 0 in)
- Position: Centre-back

Team information
- Current team: Trinidense
- Number: 18

Youth career
- 2008–2010: Sol de América

Senior career*
Years	Team	Apps	(Gls)
2011–2014	Sol de América	100	(5)
2014–2016	Cerro Porteño	60	(4)
2016–2022	América	183	(22)
2023–2024	Boca Juniors	18	(0)
2024–2025	Cerro Porteño	19	(0)
2025–2026	Boca Juniors	0	(0)
2026–	Trinidense	0	(0)

International career^{‡}
2015–	Paraguay	31	(1)
- * Club domestic league appearances and goals as of 8 March 2026 ‡ National team caps and goals as of 19 November 2019 (UTC)

Bruno Amílcar Valdez Rojas (born 6 October 1992) is a Paraguayan professional footballer who plays as a centre-back for Paraguayan Primera División club Trinidense and the Paraguay national team.

A right-footed defender, he can play as a centre-back and right-back.

== Club career ==
Valdez made his professional debut with Sol de America but in July 2014 it was sold to Cerro Porteño. In 2015, Valdez helped Cerro to win the Apertura championship.

=== América ===
In June 2016, Valdez was sold to Club América of Mexico.

=== Boca Juniors ===
On 16 January 2023, Valdez signed a 3-year contract with Boca Juniors.

== International career ==
In May 2015, Valdez was called up to the provisional 30-man roster for the Paraguay national football team to play at the 2015 Copa América. On 28 May, he was included in the 23-man final squad for the tournament by coach Ramón Díaz. On 6 June, he made his international debut as a substitute in a pre-tournament friendly against Honduras at the Estadio Manuel Ferreira in Asunción.

== Career statistics ==
=== Club ===
As of 15 April 2018

Club	Season	League			Cup		Continental		Other		Total	
Club	Season	Division	Apps	Goals	Apps	Goals	Apps	Goals	Apps	Goals	Apps	Goals
Sol de America	2011	Primera División	3	0	–		–		–		3	0
Sol de America	2012	Primera División	34	2	–		–		–		34	2
Sol de America	2013	Primera División	42	1	–		–		–		42	1
Sol de America	2014	Primera División	18	2	–		–		–		18	2
Sol de America	Total		97	5	–		–		–		97	5
Cerro Porteño	2014	Primera División	16	2	–		6	0	–		22	2
Cerro Porteño	2015	Primera División	35	2	–		2	0	–		37	2
Cerro Porteño	2016	Primera División	9	0	–		6	0	–		15	0
Cerro Porteño	Total		60	4	–		14	0	–		74	4
América	2016-17	Liga MX	30	4	8	1	–		3	0	41	5
América	2017-18	Liga MX	31	2	5	0	6	0	1	0	43	1
América	Total		61	6	13	1	6	0	4	0	84	6
Career total			218	14	13	1	20	0	4	0	255	15

=== International goals ===
Scores and results list Paraguay's goal tally first.

No	Date	Venue	Opponent	Score	Result	Competition
1.	23 March 2017	Estadio Defensores del Chaco, Asunción, Paraguay	Ecuador	1–0	2–1	2018 FIFA World Cup qualification

== Honours ==
Cerro Porteño

- Primera División: 2015 Apertura

América

- Liga MX: Apertura 2018
- Copa MX: Clausura 2019
- Campeón de Campeones: 2019

Boca Juniors

- Supercopa Argentina: 2022
