= 2023–24 Club América season =

América
2023–24 season
- President: Santiago Baños
- Manager: André Jardine
- Stadium: Estadio Azteca
- Apertura 2023: Regular phase: 1st Final phase: Winners
- Clausura 2024: Regular phase: 1st Final phase: Winners
- Campeón de Campeones: Winners (Note: Trophy awarded automatically as winners of both the Apertura and Clausura championships.)
- Leagues Cup: Round of 16
- CONCACAF Champions Cup: Semi-finals
- Top goalscorer: League: Apertura: Julián Quiñones (10); Clausura: Julián Quiñones (8); Henry Martín (8); All: Julián Quiñones (23)
- Biggest win: 5–0 v Atlético San Luis (6 December 2023)
- Biggest defeat: 1–4 v Columbus Crew (31 July 2023)
Home colours	Away colours	Third colours
- All statistics correct as of 26 May 2024.

The 2023–24 Club América season was the club's 79th consecutive season in the top-flight of Mexican football. The team participated in the Liga MX, Leagues Cup, and the CONCACAF Champions Cup.

== Coaching staff ==
Position	Staff
Manager	(Brazil) André Jardine
Assistant managers	(Brazil) Paulo Victor Gomes
Assistant managers	(Mexico) Raúl Lara
Goalkeeper coach	(Mexico) Luis Gurrola
Fitness coaches	(Brazil) Kako Perez
Fitness coaches	(Mexico) Francisco Martínez
Physiotherapists	(Argentina) Fernando Gilardi
Physiotherapists	(Mexico) Octavio Luna
Physiotherapists	(Mexico) Francisco Faustino
Team doctors	(Mexico) Alfonso Díaz
Team doctors	(Mexico) José Guadalupe Vázquez
Team doctors	(Argentina) Christian Motta

Source: Club América

== Players ==
=== Squad information ===
No.	Pos.	Nat.	Name	Date of birth (age)	Since	Previous club
Goalkeepers
1	GK	(Mexico)	Luis Malagón	2 March 1997 (age 29)	2023	(Mexico) Necaxa
27	GK	(Mexico)	Óscar Jiménez	12 October 1988 (age 37)	2017	(Mexico) Chiapas
Defenders
2	DF	(Mexico)	Luis Fuentes	14 September 1986 (age 39)	2020	Free agent
3	DF	(Mexico)	Israel Reyes	23 May 2000 (age 26)	2023	(Mexico) Puebla
4	DF	(Uruguay)	Sebastián Cáceres	18 August 1999 (age 26)	2020	(Uruguay) Liverpool
5	DF	(Mexico)	Kevin Álvarez	15 January 1999 (age 27)	2023	(Mexico) Pachuca
14	DF	(Mexico)	Néstor Araujo	29 August 1991 (age 34)	2022	(Spain) Celta de Vigo
18	DF	(Mexico)	Cristian Calderón	24 March 1997 (age 29)	2024	Free agent
23	DF	(Mexico)	Emilio Lara	18 May 2002 (age 24)	2022	Academy
26	DF	(Mexico)	Salvador Reyes	4 May 1998 (age 28)	2021	(Mexico) Puebla
29	DF	(Mexico)	Ramón Juárez	9 May 2001 (age 25)	2019	Academy
31	DF	(Chile)	Igor Lichnovsky	7 March 1994 (age 32)	2023	(Mexico) UANL
Midfielders
6	MF	(Mexico)	Jonathan dos Santos	26 April 1990 (age 36)	2022	Free agent
8	MF	(Spain)	Álvaro Fidalgo	9 April 1997 (age 29)	2021	(Spain) Castellón
10	MF	(Chile)	Diego Valdés	30 January 1994 (age 32)	2021	(Mexico) Santos Laguna
16	MF	(Mexico)	Santiago Naveda	16 April 2001 (age 25)	2020	(Poland) Miedź Legnica
17	MF	(United States)	Alejandro Zendejas	7 February 1998 (age 28)	2022	(Mexico) Necaxa
20	MF	(Paraguay)	Richard Sánchez	29 March 1996 (age 30)	2019	(Paraguay) Olimpia
24	MF	(Netherlands)	Javairô Dilrosun	22 June 1998 (age 27)	2024	(Netherlands) Feyenoord
Forwards
7	FW	(Uruguay)	Brian Rodríguez	20 May 2000 (age 26)	2022	(United States) LAFC
19	FW	(Mexico)	Illian Hernández	12 April 2000 (age 26)	2024	(Mexico) Pachuca
21	FW	(Mexico)	Henry Martín	18 September 1992 (age 33)	2018	(Mexico) Tijuana
30	FW	(Mexico)	Román Martínez	18 August 2002 (age 23)	2022	Academy
33	FW	(Mexico)	Julián Quiñones	24 March 1997 (age 29)	2023	(Mexico) Atlas

Players and squad numbers last updated on 20 March 2024.
Note: Flags indicate national team as has been defined under FIFA eligibility rules. Players may hold more than one non-FIFA nationality.

== Transfers ==
=== Summer ===
==== In ====
Date	Pos.	Player	Age	From	Fee	Source
29 May 2023	MF	(Mexico) Santiago Naveda	22	(Poland) Miedź Legnica	End of loan	
12 June 2023	MF	(Mexico) Mauro Lainez	27	(Mexico) Juárez	End of loan	
13 June 2023	DF	(Mexico) Kevin Álvarez	24	(Mexico) Pachuca	Undisclosed	
3 July 2023	FW	(Mexico) Julián Quiñones	26	(Mexico) Atlas	Undisclosed	
13 September 2023	DF	(Chile) Igor Lichnovsky	29	(Mexico) UANL	On loan	

==== Out ====
Date	Pos.	Player	Age	To	Fee	Source
12 June 2023	MF	(Peru) Pedro Aquino	28	(Mexico) Santos Laguna	Undisclosed	
13 June 2023	MF	(Mexico) Jürgen Damm	30	Released		
20 June 2023	FW	(Uruguay) Federico Viñas	24	(Mexico) León	Undisclosed	
30 June 2023	FW	(Colombia) Roger Martínez	29	Released		
1 September 2023	MF	(Mexico) Mauro Lainez	27	(Mexico) Querétaro	On loan	

=== Winter ===
==== In ====
Date	Pos.	Player	Age	From	Fee	Source
3 January 2024	DF	(Mexico) Cristian Calderón	26	Free agent		
10 January 2024	FW	(Mexico) Illian Hernández	23	(Mexico) Pachuca	On loan	
2 February 2024	MF	(Netherlands) Javairô Dilrosun	25	(Netherlands) Feyenoord	Undisclosed (Note: Reportedly €5 million.)	

==== Out ====
Date	Pos.	Player	Age	To	Fee	Source
17 December 2023	DF	(Mexico) Miguel Layún	35	Retired		
10 January 2024	DF	(United States) Ralph Orquin	20	(Mexico) Juárez	On loan	
1 February 2024	MF	(Argentina) Leonardo Suárez	27	(Mexico) UNAM	Undisclosed	
20 March 2024	FW	(Uruguay) Jonathan Rodríguez	30	(United States) Portland Timbers	Undisclosed	

== Pre-season and friendlies ==
Club América will precede their 2023–24 campaign by taking part in the "Tour Águila" in the United States, along with mid-season friendlies as well.

Date	Opponents	H / A	Result F–A	Scorers
17 June 2023	(Mexico) Toluca	N	0–0	
20 June 2023	(Mexico) Monterrey	N	0–1	
10 September 2023	(Mexico) UANL	N	2–1	Suárez 68', 79'
15 October 2023	(Mexico) Guadalajara	N	2–0	Quiñones 29', 54'
21 December 2023	(Spain) Barcelona	N	3–2	Quiñones 12', 50', Martín 81'
23 March 2024	(Mexico) Cruz Azul	N	2–3	Hernández 10', Fidalgo 17'

== Competitions ==
=== Overview ===
Competition	First match	Last match	Starting round	Final position	Record							
Competition	First match	Last match	Starting round	Final position	Pld	W	D	L	GF	GA	GD	Win %
Apertura	30 June 2023	17 December 2023	Matchday 1	Winners	23	15	6	2	50	19	+31	65.22
Clausura	13 January 2024	26 May 2024	Matchday 1	Winners	23	12	9	2	35	15	+20	52.17
Leagues Cup	27 July 2023	8 August 2023	Group stage	Round of 16	4	2	1	1	8	6	+2	50.00
CONCACAF Champions Cup	6 February 2024	30 April 2024	Round One	Semi-finals	8	4	1	3	19	10	+9	50.00
Total					58	33	17	8	112	50	+62	56.90

Last updated: 26 May 2024
Source: Competitions

==== Apertura 2023 ====
Overall								Home						Away					
Pld	W	D	L	GF	GA	GD	Pts	W	D	L	GF	GA	GD	W	D	L	GF	GA	GD
23	15	6	2	50	19	+31	51	9	2	2	30	11	+19	6	4	0	20	8	+12

Source: Match reports

==== Clausura 2024 ====
Overall								Home						Away					
Pld	W	D	L	GF	GA	GD	Pts	W	D	L	GF	GA	GD	W	D	L	GF	GA	GD
23	12	9	2	33	13	+20	45	7	3	0	16	5	+11	5	6	2	17	8	+9

Source: Match reports

== Apertura 2023 ==
The Apertura 2023 fixtures were released on 7 June 2023.

=== Regular phase ===
30 June 2023 1	América	1–2	Juárez	Mexico City
19:00 CT	Suárez 14' (yellow card) 59'	Report	Sosa (yellow card) 44'; Ortega (yellow card) 75'; A. García 86'; Zapata 90+5'	Stadium: Estadio Azteca; Attendance: 13,391; Referee: Ismael Rosario López Peñuelas

15 July 2023 3	América	3–0	Puebla	Mexico City
19:00 CT	Álvarez 34'; Suárez 45+1'; Quiñones 87'; Cáceres (yellow card) 88'	Report	Robles (yellow card) 31'	Stadium: Estadio Azteca; Attendance: 32,294; Referee: Víctor Alfonso Caceres Hernandez

20 August 2023 4	América	1–1	Atlas	Mexico City
21:10 CT	Suárez (yellow card) 29'; B. Rodríguez 34'	Report	Caicedo 23'; Santamaría (yellow card) 25'; Zapata (yellow card) 65'; Vargas (yellow card) 71'; Martínez (yellow card) 85'	Stadium: Estadio Azteca; Attendance: 17,046; Referee: Adonai Escobedo González
Note: The match was originally scheduled to be played at the Estadio Jalisco in Guadalajara, but was rescheduled due to poor pitch conditions.

23 August 2023 5	América	3–2	Necaxa	Mexico City
19:00 CT	Valdés 23'; B. Rodríguez 30'; Quiñones 60'; Lara (yellow card) 66'; Álvarez (yellow card) 90+4'	Report	Batista 3' 55'; Colorado (yellow card) 9'; Poggi (yellow card) 65'	Stadium: Estadio Azteca; Attendance: 19,065; Referee: Marco Antonio Ortiz Nava

26 August 2023 6	América	1–1	León	Mexico City
19:00 CT	dos Santos (yellow card) 54'; Quiñones 64'; Álvarez (yellow card) 76' (yellow-red card) 90+4'	Report	Tesillo (yellow card) 14'; Barreiro (yellow card) 15'; Mena (yellow card) 36'; Viñas 57'; O. Rodríguez (yellow card) 74'	Stadium: Estadio Azteca; Attendance: 30,701; Referee: Oscar Macías Romero

2 September 2023 7	Cruz Azul	2–3	América	Mexico City
21:00 CT	Rotondi 20' (yellow card) 51'; Rodríguez (red card) 35'; Antuna (yellow card) 47' (goal) 80'; Escobar (yellow card) 53'; Ditta (yellow card) 90+1'	Report	Quiñones 4'; Malagón (yellow card) 28'; Sánchez (yellow card) 35' (goal) 45+4'; dos Santos (yellow card) 40'; B. Rodríguez 45+7'; Cáceres (yellow card) 82'; Zendejas (yellow card) 90+1'	Stadium: Estadio Azteca; Attendance: 36,500; Referee: Daniel Quintero Huitrón

16 September 2023 8	América	4–0	Guadalajara	Mexico City
21:10	B. Rodríguez 21'; Valdés 36' 65'; Suárez (yellow card) 58'; Lichnovsky (yellow card) 68'; Zendejas 79'	Report	Alvarado (yellow card) 58'; Briseño (yellow card) 68'	Stadium: Estadio Azteca; Attendance: 62,514; Referee: Fernando Guerrero Ramírez

20 September 2023 2	Querétaro	1–2	América	Querétaro
20:06 CT	Zuñiga 21'	Report	Valdés 52'; Álvarez (yellow card) 62'; Lichnovsky 78'	Stadium: Estadio Corregidora; Attendance: 31,296; Referee: Diego Montaño Robles
Note: The match was scheduled on 9 July and postponed due to poor pitch conditions.

24 September 2023 9	Toluca	1–1	América	Toluca
12:00 CT	Huerta (yellow card) 43'; Araújo 54'; Belmonte (red card) 84'	Report	Valdes 25'	Stadium: Estadio Nemesio Díez; Attendance: 27,273; Referee: Adonai Escobedo González

30 September 2023 10	América	1–0	UNAM	Mexico City
18:40 CT	Martín (yellow card) 11'; Lichnovsky (yellow card) 61'; J. Rodríguez 75' (yellow card) 76'; Malagón (yellow card) 87'	Report	Monroy (yellow card) 15'; Benevendo (yellow card) 18'; Nathan (yellow card) 57'; Huerta (yellow card) 66'; González (yellow card) 73'	Stadium: Estadio Azteca; Attendance: 62,707; Referee: Víctor Alfonso Cáceres Hernández

3 October 2023 11	América	4–0	Pachuca	Mexico City
21:00 CT	Juárez (yellow card) 21'; Martín 41'; Fidalgo (yellow card) 53'; Zendejas 58'; Quiñones 87'; J. Rodríguez 90+3'	Report	Cabral (yellow card) 40'; Montiel (yellow card) 51'	Stadium: Estadio Azteca; Attendance: 30,479; Referee: Marco Antonio Ortiz Nava

6 October 2023 12	Mazatlán	1–2	América	Mazatlán
21:00 CT	Bárcenas (yellow card) 19'; Madueña (yellow card) 20'; Flores (yellow card) 24'; Colmán (yellow card) 33'; Amarilla 39' (yellow card) 41'	Report	Lichnovsky (yellow card) 3' (goal) 76'; Lara (red card) 42'; Valdés 54'	Stadium: Estadio de Mazatlán; Attendance: 18,000; Referee: Oscar Macías García

21 October 2023 13	América	4–3	Santos Laguna	Mexico City
19:00 CT	Martín 13'; J. Rodríguez 19'; Quiñones (yellow card) 26' (goal) 45+5' (pen.); Zendejas 76'; S. Reyes (yellow card) 89'; Lichnovsky (yellow card) 89'	Report	Brunetta 2'; Preciado 20'; Prieto (yellow card) 45+4'; E. Rodríguez 52' (yellow card) 67'; A. López (yellow card) 80'	Stadium: Estadio Azteca; Attendance: 39,968; Referee: César Arturo Ramos Palazuelos

28 October 2023 14	Monterrey	0–3	América	Guadalupe
21:10 CT	Medina (yellow card) 4'; Meza (red card) 18'	Report	J. Rodríguez 1' 21'; dos Santos (yellow card) 10'; Zendejas (yellow card) 30' (goal) 32'; Lichnovsky (yellow card) 31'	Stadium: Estadio BBVA; Attendance: 47,177; Referee: Adonai Escobedo González

1 November 2023 15	Atlético San Luis	0–1	América	San Luis Potosí
21:00 CT	Villalpando (yellow card) 31'; Chávez (yellow card) 59'; Klimowicz (yellow card) 74'	Report	Martín 32'; Álvarez (yellow card) 90'	Stadium: Estadio Alfonso Lastras; Attendance: 22,584; Referee: Fernando Guerrero Ramírez

4 November 2023 16	América	3–0	Tijuana	Mexico City
19:00 CT	Sánchez (yellow card) 49'; Zendejas 73'; J. Rodríguez 78'; Fidalgo 85'	Report	Balanta (yellow card) 26' (yellow-red card) 61'	Stadium: Estadio Azteca; Attendance: 46,046; Referee: Oscar Mejia García

11 November 2023 17	UANL	0–0	América	San Nicolás de los Garza
21:10 CT	Samir (yellow card) 24'	Report	J. Quiñones (yellow card) 36'	Stadium: Estadio Universitario; Attendance: 37,738; Referee: Diego Montaño Robles

==== Goalscorers ====
Position	Nation	Name	Goals scored
1.	(Mexico)	Julián Quiñones	6
1.	(Uruguay)	Jonathan Rodríguez	6
1.	(Chile)	Diego Valdés	6
2.	(United States)	Alejandro Zendejas	5
3.	(Uruguay)	Brian Rodríguez	4
4.	(Mexico)	Henry Martín	3
5.	(Chile)	Igor Lichnovsky	2
5.	(Argentina)	Leonardo Suárez	2
6.	(Mexico)	Kevin Álvarez	1
6.	(Spain)	Álvaro Fidalgo	1
6.	(Paraguay)	Richard Sánchez	1
Total			37

=== Final phase ===
==== Quarter-finals ====
29 November 2023 First leg	León	2–2	América	Guanajuato
19:06 CT	Bellón 1'; Mena (yellow card) 22'; López (yellow card) 31' (goal) 38'; Viñas (yellow card) 53'; Sánchez (yellow card) 65'; Tesillo (yellow card) 66'; Rodríguez (yellow card) 90+4'	Report	Martín 5' 46'; Lichnovsky (yellow card) 20'; Zendejas (yellow card) 76'	Stadium: Estadio León; Attendance: 25,823; Referee: Marco Antonio Ortiz Nava

2 December 2023 Second leg	América	2–0 (4–2 agg.)	León	Mexico City
21:10 CT	Quiñones 60' (pen.); Layún (yellow card) 81'; Martín 88'	Report	Frías (yellow card) 59'; Cervantes (yellow card) 85'	Stadium: Estadio Azteca; Attendance: 61,823; Referee: Fernando Guerrero Ramírez

==== Semi-finals ====
6 December 2023 First leg	Atlético San Luis	0–5	América	San Luis Potosí
21:00 CT	Rodrigo Dourado (yellow card) 62'	Report	Valdés 3', 64'; Martín 13'; Quiñones 83', 90+4'	Stadium: Estadio Alfonso Lastras; Attendance: 22,589; Referee: Adonai Escobedo González

9 December 2023 Second leg	América	0–2 (5–2 agg.)	Atlético San Luis	Mexico City
20:00 CT		Report	Zaldívar 47' 86'	Stadium: Estadio Azteca; Attendance: 57,964; Referee: César Arturo Ramos Palazuelos

==== Final ====
14 December 2023 First leg	UANL	1–1	América	San Nicolás de los Garza
21:00	Carioca (yellow card) 2'; Herrera 71'; Córdova (yellow card) 82'	Report	Lichnovsky (yellow card) 8'; Martín 50' (pen.)	Stadium: Estadio Universitario; Attendance: 41,615; Referee: Marco Antonio Ortiz Nava

17 December 2023 Second leg	América	3–0 (a.e.t.) (4–1 agg.)	UANL	Mexico City
19:30	Lichnovsky (yellow card) 7'; Layún (yellow card) 26'; Quiñones 91'; R. Sánchez 104'; J. Rodríguez 119'	Report	Reyes (yellow card) 32'; Carioca (yellow card) 36'; Fulgencio (red card) 80'; Guzmán (yellow card) 92' (yellow-red card) 95'; L. Quiñones (red card) 120'	Stadium: Estadio Azteca; Attendance: 74,957; Referee: Adonai Escobedo González

==== Goalscorers ====
Position	Nation	Name	Goals scored
1.	(Mexico)	Henry Martín	5
2.	(Mexico)	Julián Quiñones	4
3.	(Chile)	Diego Valdés	2
4.	(Uruguay)	Jonathan Rodríguez	1
4.	(Paraguay)	Richard Sánchez	1
Total			13

== Clausura 2024 ==
The Clausura 2024 fixtures were released on 17 December 2023.

=== Regular phase ===
13 January 2024 1	Tijuana	0–2	América	Tijuana
19:00 PT	Díaz (yellow card) 44'; Rivera (yellow card) 79'	Report	S. Martínez (yellow card) 42'; S. Reyes 89' 90+4'	Stadium: Estadio Caliente; Attendance: 31,133; Referee: Edgar Allan Morales Olvera

20 January 2024 2	América	2–0	Querétaro	Mexico City
19:05 CT	Zendejas (yellow card) 59'; Sánchez 61'; Quiñones 84'	Report	Batista (yellow card) 33'; Cordero (yellow card) 34'; Barbieri (yellow card) 88'	Stadium: Estadio Azteca; Attendance: 31,564; Referee: Maximiliano Quintero Hernández

24 January 2024 4	Juárez	0–2	América	Ciudad Juárez
20:05 MT	J. García (yellow card) 2'; Ortiz (yellow card) 43'; Mosquera (yellow card) 53'; A. García (yellow card) 57'; Salas (yellow card) 90+5'	Report	Valdés 16'; Jardine (yellow card) 55'; Álvarez (yellow card) 75'; Fidalgo 84'	Stadium: Estadio Olímpico Benito Juárez; Attendance: 17,418; Referee: Luis Enrique Santander Aguirre

27 January 2024 3	Necaxa	0–0	América	Aguascalientes
21:00	Cambindo (red card) 24'; Fentanes (yellow card) 24'; Peña (yellow card) 66'	Report	Sánchez (red card) 14'; Jardine (yellow card) 17'; dos Santos (yellow card) 33'; Valdés (yellow card) 68'	Stadium: Estadio Victoria; Attendance: 20,837; Referee: Diego Montaño Robles

3 February 2024 5	América	1–1	Monterrey	Mexico City
21:10 CT	Valdés 24'; Lichnovsky (yellow card) 26'	Report	Canales 40'; Andrada (yellow card) 76'; Moreno (red card) 90+2'	Stadium: Estadio Azteca; Attendance: 41,158; Referee: César Arturo Ramos Palazuelos

10 February 2024 6	León	0–1	América	León
19:00 CT	Frías (yellow card) 20'; E. Hernández (yellow card) 27'; Ambríz (yellow card) 60'; A. Iglesias (red card) 90+1'	Report	dos Santos (yellow card) 20'; J. Rodríguez (yellow card) 67' (goal) 90+8' (pen.); Valdés (yellow card) 87'	Stadium: Estadio León; Attendance: 23,304; Referee: Marco Antonio Ortiz Nava

17 February 2024 7	Pachuca	2–1	América	Pachuca
19:00 CT	Cabral (yellow card) 28'; É. Sánchez 55', 75', (yellow card) 90+4'; Pedraza (yellow card) 79'; J.Berlanga (yellow card) 82'	Report	Quiñones 65'; Lichnovsky (yellow card) 80'	Stadium: Estadio Hidalgo; Attendance: 18,143; Referee: Víctor Alfonso Cáceres Hernández

21 February 2024 9	América	2–2	Mazatlán	Mexico City
21:00 CT	Martín 46', 75'	Report	Amarilla 24', 52'; Esquivel (yellow card) 64'; González (yellow card) 90+3'; Bárcenas (yellow card) 90+4'	Stadium: Estadio Azteca; Attendance: 18,199; Referee: Ismael Rosario López Peñuelas

24 February 2024 8	América	1–0	Cruz Azul	Mexico City
21:10 CT	Quiñones 3'	Report	C. Rodríguez (yellow card) 39'; Salcedo (yellow card) 45+2'; Piovi (yellow card) 72'	Stadium: Estadio Azteca; Attendance: 59,032; Referee: Oscar Mejía García

2 March 2024 10	Atlas	1–5	América	Guadalajara
21:10 CT	Santamaría (yellow card) 2' (yellow-red card) 45+7'; E. Aguirre 7'; R. Lozano (yellow card) 37'	Report	Quiñones 31'; Martín 45+11', 85'; Zendejas 75', 81'	Stadium: Estadio Jalisco; Attendance: 40,694; Referee: Fernando Guerrero Ramírez

9 March 2024 11	América	2–0	UANL	Mexico City
21:00	Dilrosun 28'; Naveda (yellow card) 36'; Jiménez (yellow card) 39'; Zendejas 69'	Report		Stadium: Estadio Azteca; Attendance: 45,063; Referee: Víctor Alfonso Cáceres Hernández

16 March 2024 12	Guadalajara	0–0	América	Zapopan
21:05	González (yellow card) 11'; Sepúlveda (yellow card) 58'; Marín (yellow card) 74'; Brizuela (yellow card) 87'	Report	Lichnovsky (yellow card) 74'; dos Santos (yellow card) 85'	Stadium: Estadio Akron; Attendance: 42,650; Referee: Fernando Hernández Goméz

28 March 2024 13	América	2–1	Atlético San Luis	Mexico City
20:00	Valdés 53'; Cáceres (yellow card) 74'; B. Rodríguez 83'	Report	Moreno (yellow card) 26'; Boli 90+5' (pen.)	Stadium: Estadio Azteca; Attendance: 34,476; Referee: Jesus Rafael Lopez Valle

6 April 2024 14	Santos Laguna	1–1	América	Torreón
21:05	Loroña (yellow card) 10'; Núñez (yellow card) 23'; S. Carrillo 58'	Report	Araujo (yellow card) 22'; Dilrosun (yellow card) 27'; dos Santos (yellow card) 66'; Zendejas 75'	Stadium: Estadio Corona; Attendance: 28,596; Referee: Luis Enrique Santander Aguirre

13 April 2024 15	América	5–1	Toluca	Mexico City
19:05	Valdés 8' 23'; Martín 15'; Calderón (yellow card) 18'; Quiñones 73' 82' (yellow card) 90+3'; Fidalgo (yellow card) 90+2'	Report	Domínguez 14'; Escobar (yellow card) 49'; Ruiz (yellow card) 90+2'	Stadium: Estadio Azteca; Attendance: 65,644; Referee: Adonai Escobedo González

20 April 2024 16	UNAM	2–1	América	Mexico City
21:10	Monroy (yellow card) 13'; Rivas 38'; Quispe (yellow card) 45'; Suárez 60'; Funes Mori (yellow card) 68'; Caicedo (yellow card) 86'; Huerta (yellow card) 90+1'	Report	Martín 19' (pen.); I. Reyes (yellow card) 38'; Cáseres (yellow card) 51'; Lichnovsky (yellow card) 68'; Zendejas (yellow card) 73'; Malagón (yellow card) 73'; B. Rodríguez (red card) 90+1'	Stadium: Estadio Olímpico Universitario; Attendance: 44,670; Referee: Fernando Guerrero Ramírez

26 April 2024 17	Puebla	1–2	América	Puebla
19:00	Ferrareis 8'; P. González (yellow card) 66'	Report	S. Reyes 20' 45+3'	Stadium: Estadio Cuauhtémoc; Attendance: 42,320; Referee: Guillermo Pacheco Larios

==== Goalscorers ====
Position	Nation	Name	Goals scored
1.	(Mexico)	Henry Martín	6
1.	(Mexico)	Julián Quiñones	6
2.	(Chile)	Diego Valdés	5
3.	(Mexico)	Salvador Reyes	4
3.	(United States)	Alejandro Zendejas	4
4.	(Netherlands)	Javairô Dilrosun	1
4.	(Spain)	Álvaro Fidalgo	1
4.	(Uruguay)	Brian Rodríguez	1
4.	(Uruguay)	Jonathan Rodríguez	1
4.	(Paraguay)	Richard Sánchez	1
Total			30

=== Final phase ===
==== Quarter-finals ====
8 May 2024 First leg	Pachuca	1–1	América	Pachuca
21:16 CT	Rondón 21'; Micolta (yellow card) 89'	Report	Martín 45+1'; Valdés (yellow card) 72'	Stadium: Estadio Hidalgo; Attendance: 18,043; Referee: Fernando Guerrero Ramírez

11 May 2024 Second leg	América	1–1 (2 (s)–2 agg.)	Pachuca	Mexico City
18:00 p.m. CT	Valdés (yellow card) 23'; dos Santos (yellow card) 28'; Quiñones 90+4' (yellow card) 90+5'; Hernández (yellow card) 90+9'	Report	Idrissi 31'; Micolta (yellow card) 39'; Cabral (yellow card) 90+9'; Sánchez (yellow card) 90+10'	Stadium: Estadio Azteca; Attendance: 46,570; Referee: Víctor Alfonso Cáceres Hernández

==== Semi-finals ====
15 May 2024 First leg	Guadalajara	0–0	América	Zapopan
20:05	González (yellow card) 76'	Report	Lichnovsky (yellow card) 12'	Stadium: Estadio Akron; Attendance: 43,628; Referee: Oscar Mejía García

18 May 2024 Second leg	América	1–0 (1–0 agg.)	Guadalajara	Mexico City
20:00	I. Reyes 60'; P. V. Gomes (red card) 61'	Report	Orozco (yellow card) 38'; Gutiérrez (yellow card) 86'	Stadium: Estadio Azteca; Attendance: 70,187; Referee: Cesar Arturo Ramos Palazuelos

==== Final ====
23 May 2024 First leg	Cruz Azul	1–1	América	Mexico City
20:00 CT	Antuna 9' (pen.)	Report	Quiñones 16'	Stadium: Estadio Ciudad de los Deportes; Attendance: 27,244; Referee: Fernando Hernández Gómez

26 May 2024 Second leg	América	1–0 (2–1 agg.)	Cruz Azul	Mexico City
19:00 CT	I. Reyes (yellow card) 59'; Martín 78' (pen.) (yellow card) 79'; Quiñones (yellow card) 80'	Report	Rotondi (yellow card) 38'	Stadium: Estadio Azteca; Attendance: 73,604; Referee: Marco Antonio Ortiz Nava

==== Goalscorers ====
Position	Nation	Name	Goals scored
1.	(Mexico)	Julián Quiñones	2
1.	(Mexico)	Henry Martín	2
2.	(Mexico)	Israel Reyes	1
Total			5

== CONCACAF Champions Cup ==
=== Round one ===
6 February 2024 First leg	Real Estelí (Nicaragua)	2–1	(Mexico) América	Estelí
21:00 CT	Bonilla 7' (pen.); Fletes 47'; Acevedo (yellow card) 50'; López (yellow card) 86'	Report	Quiñones 90+2'	Stadium: Estadio Independencia; Attendance: 4,858; Referee: Drew Fischer (Canada)

14 February 2024 Second leg	América (Mexico)	2–0 (3–2 agg.)	(Nicaragua) Real Estelí	Mexico City
21:15 CT	J. Rodríguez 18'; Quiñones (yellow card) 40'; Cáceres (yellow card) 43'; Zendejas 54'	Report	López (yellow card) 30'; Medina (yellow card) 63'	Stadium: Estadio Ciudad de los Deportes; Attendance: 18,123; Referee: Ismail Elfath (United States)

=== Round of 16 ===
6 March 2024 First leg	Guadalajara (Mexico)	0–3	(Mexico) América	Zapopan
22:00 CT	Torres (yellow card) 13' (yellow-red card) 61'; Alvarado (yellow card) 75'; Mozo (yellow card) 83'	Report	Quiñones 15' (pen.); dos Santos (yellow card) 33'; Jardine (yellow card) 39'; Valdés 70'; I. Reyes (yellow card) 89'; Martín 90+4'	Stadium: Estadio Akron; Attendance: 43,111; Referee: Saíd Martínez (Honduras)

13 March 2024 Second leg	América (Mexico)	2–3 (5–3 agg.)	(Mexico) Guadalajara	Mexico City
22:30 CT	Mozo 51' (o.g.); Zendejas 60'; Juárez (yellow card) 90+3'	Report	Cowell 12'; Marín 32'; F. González (yellow card) 37'; Alvarado 63'; L. Sepúlveda (yellow card) 85'; Briseño (yellow card) 90+2'	Stadium: Estadio Azteca; Attendance: 59,405; Referee: Mario Escobar (Guatemala)

=== Quarter-finals ===
2 April 2024 First leg (Note: The Revolution were slated to host the second leg of the quarterfinals due to their superior record in the competition, but due to a scheduling conflict at Gillette Stadium, they requested to host the first leg.)	New England Revolution (United States)	0–4	(Mexico) América	Foxborough
21:00 CT	Polster (yellow card) 20'; Vrioni (yellow card) 44'; Jonathan (yellow card) 60'	Report	Martín 16'; Zendejas 24'; Calderón 63' (yellow card) 44'; B. Rodríguez 90+1'	Stadium: Gillette Stadium; Attendance: 11,978; Referee: Ismael Cornejo (El Salvador)

9 April 2024 Second leg	América (Mexico)	5–2 (9–2 agg.)	(United States) New England Revolution	Mexico City
22:30 CT	Valdés 21'; Quiñones 34'; Martín 45+4'; Zendejas 57'; B. Rodríguez 76' (pen.)	Report	Kessler (yellow card) 52'; Vrioni 65', 90+2'; Spaulding (yellow card) 89'	Stadium: Estadio Azteca; Attendance: 18,636; Referee: Saíd Martínez (Honduras)

=== Semi-finals ===
23 April 2024 First leg	América (Mexico)	1–1	(Mexico) Pachuca	Mexico City
22:15 CT	Zendejas 12' (yellow card) 39'; Jardine (yellow card) 90+5'	Report	Micolta 40'; E. Rodríguez (yellow card) 48'; Sánchez (yellow card) 59'; Berlanga (yellow card) 63'	Stadium: Estadio Azteca; Attendance: 40,882; Referee: Ismail Elfath (United States)

30 April 2024 Second leg	Pachuca (Mexico)	2–1 (3–2 agg.)	(Mexico) América	Hidalgo
21:15 CT	E. Rodríguez 12'; Deossa 14'; Cabral (yellow card) 45+3'; Berlanga (yellow card) 62'; Micolta (yellow card) 73'; Pedraza (yellow card) 85'; B. González (yellow card) 90+2'	Report	Martín 23'; dos Santos (yellow card) 47'; Juárez (yellow card) 55'; Lichnovsky (yellow card) 71'; Reyes (red card) 90'	Stadium: Estadio Hidalgo; Attendance: 16,768; Referee: Drew Fischer (Canada)

== Leagues Cup ==
=== Central 1 ===
Pos	Team	Pld	W	PW	PL	L	GF	GA	GD	Pts	Qualification	CLB	CAM	STL
1	(United States) Columbus Crew	2	2	0	0	0	6	2	+4	6	Advance to knockout stage	—	—	2–1
2	(Mexico) América	2	1	0	0	1	5	4	+1	3	Advance to knockout stage	1–4	—	4–0
3	(United States) St. Louis City SC	2	0	0	0	2	1	6	−5	0		—	—	—

Source: Leagues Cup
Rules for classification: Tiebreakers

27 July 2023 group	América (Mexico)	4–0	(United States) St. Louis City SC	St. Louis
22:00 (20:00 UTC-5)	Martín 5'; dos Santos (yellow card) 49'; Quiñones 51'; Álvarez 54'; Zendejas 77'	Report	Parker (yellow card) 16'; Löwen (yellow card) 81'; Hiebert (yellow card) 84'; Jackson (yellow card) 85'	Stadium: CityPark; Attendance: 22,430; Referee: Selvin Brown

31 July 2023 group	América (Mexico)	1–4	(United States) Columbus Crew	Columbus
20:00	Álvarez 29'	Report	Hernández 41', 69' (pen.); Ramírez 81'; Moreira 90+3'	Stadium: Lower.com Field; Attendance: 20,217; Referee: Fernando Guerrero Ramírez

=== Round of 32 ===
4 August 2023 R32	América (Mexico)	1–0	(United States) Chicago Fire FC	Bridgeview
20:00 (18:00 UTC-5)	Álvarez (yellow card) 23'; Giménez 64' (o.g.); Sánchez (red card) 94'	Report	M. Navarro (yellow card) 23' Souquet (yellow card) 87' Shaqiri (yellow card) 96' Pineda (yellow card) 99'	Stadium: SeatGeek Stadium; Attendance: 18,417; Referee: Walter López Castellanos

=== Round of 16 ===
8 August 2023 R16	América (Mexico)	2–2 (5–6 p)	(United States) Nashville SC	Nashville
20:00 (18:00 UTC-5)	dos Santos (yellow card) 9'; Valdés 78'; Quiñones 90+4' (pen.), (yellow card) 90+5'	Report	Zimmerman 61'; Willis (yellow card) 87'; Godoy (yellow card) 90+1'; MacNaughton (yellow card) 90+2'; Surridge 90+9'	Stadium: GEODIS Park; Attendance: 24,662; Referee: Selvin Brown
	Penalties
	Quiñones (penalty scored); Layún (penalty missed); Zendejas (penalty scored); I. Reyes (penalty scored); Valdés (penalty scored); Fidalgo (penalty scored); dos Santos (penalty missed)		(penalty missed) Mukhtar; (penalty scored) Surridge; (penalty scored) Godoy; (penalty scored) Zimmerman; (penalty scored) McCarty; (penalty scored) Maher; (penalty scored) Lovitz
