= 2021–22 Club América season =

América
2021–22 season
- President: Santiago Baños
- Manager: Santiago Solari (until 2 March 2022); Fernando Ortiz (interim, from 3 March 2022)
- Stadium: Estadio Azteca
- Apertura 2021: Regular phase: 1st Final phase: Quarter-finals
- Clausura 2022: Regular phase: 4th Final phase: Semi-finals
- 2021 CONCACAF Champions League: Runners-up
- Top goalscorer: League: Apertura: Álvaro Fidalgo (4); Clausura: Diego Valdés (7); All: Diego Valdés (7)
Home colours	Away colours	Third colours
- All statistics correct as of 22 May 2022.

The 2021–22 Club América season is the club's 77th consecutive season in the top-flight of Mexican football. The team will participate in the Liga MX.

== Coaching staff ==
Position	Staff
Manager	(Argentina) Fernando Ortiz (interim)
Assistant managers	(Mexico) Raúl Lara
Assistant managers	(Mexico) Peter Thelemaque
Goalkeeper coach	(Mexico) Luis Gurrola
Fitness coaches	(Mexico) Francisco Martínez
Fitness coaches	(Canada) Paolo Pacione
Physiotherapists	(Argentina) Fernando Gilardi
Physiotherapists	(Mexico) Octavio Luna
Physiotherapists	(Mexico) Francisco Faustino
Team doctors	(Mexico) Alfonso Díaz
Team doctors	(Mexico) José Guadalupe Vázquez
Team doctors	(Argentina) Christian Motta

Source: Club América

== Players ==
=== Squad information ===
No.	Pos.	Nat.	Name	Date of birth (age)	Signed in	Previous club
Goalkeepers
13	GK	(Mexico)	Guillermo Ochoa	13 July 1985 (aged 36)	2019	(Belgium) Standard Liège
27	GK	(Mexico)	Óscar Jiménez	12 October 1988 (aged 33)	2017	(Mexico) Chiapas
Defenders
2	DF	(Mexico)	Luis Fuentes	14 September 1986 (aged 35)	2020	Free agent
3	DF	(Mexico)	Jorge Sánchez	10 December 1997 (aged 24)	2018	(Mexico) Santos Laguna
4	DF	(Uruguay)	Sebastián Cáceres	18 August 1999 (aged 22)	2020	(Uruguay) Liverpool
18	DF	(Paraguay)	Bruno Valdez	6 October 1992 (aged 29)	2016	(Paraguay) Cerro Porteño
22	DF	(Spain)	Jorge Mere	17 April 1997 (aged 24)	2022	(Germany) 1. FC Köln
25	DF	(Mexico)	Jordan Silva	30 July 1994 (aged 27)	2021	(Mexico) Tijuana (on loan)
26	DF	(Mexico)	Salvador Reyes	4 May 1998 (aged 23)	2021	(Mexico) Puebla
29	DF	(Mexico)	Miguel Layún	25 June 1988 (aged 33)	2021	(Mexico) Monterrey
Midfielders
5	MF	(Peru)	Pedro Aquino	13 April 1995 (aged 26)	2021	(Mexico) León
7	MF	(Mexico)	Jonathan dos Santos	26 April 1990 (aged 31)	2022	Free agent
8	MF	(Spain)	Álvaro Fidalgo	9 April 1997 (aged 24)	2021	(Spain) Castellón
10	MF	(Chile)	Diego Valdés	30 January 1994 (aged 27)	2021	(Mexico) Santos Laguna
17	MF	(Mexico)	Alejandro Zendejas	7 February 1998 (aged 23)	2022	(Mexico) Necaxa
20	MF	(Paraguay)	Richard Sánchez	29 March 1998 (aged 23)	2019	(Paraguay) Olimpia
28	MF	(Mexico)	Mauro Lainez	9 May 1996 (aged 25)	2020	(Mexico) Tijuana
30	MF	(Colombia)	Juan Ferney Otero	26 May 1995 (aged 26)	2022	(Mexico) Santos Laguna
34	MF	(Mexico)	Santiago Naveda	16 April 2001 (aged 20)	2021	Academy
Forwards
9	FW	(Colombia)	Roger Martínez	23 June 1994 (aged 27)	2018	(China) Jiangsu Suning
21	FW	(Mexico)	Henry Martín	18 September 1992 (aged 29)	2018	(Mexico) Tijuana
24	FW	(Uruguay)	Federico Viñas	30 June 1998 (aged 23)	2019	(Uruguay) Juventud

Players and squad numbers last updated on 26 January 2022.
Note: Flags indicate national team as has been defined under FIFA eligibility rules. Players may hold more than one non-FIFA nationality.

== Transfers ==
=== Summer ===
==== In ====
Date	Pos.	Player	Age	From	Fee	Source
1 June 2021	MF	(Spain) Álvaro Fidalgo	24	(Spain) Castellón	US$1 million	
3 June 2021	DF	(Mexico) Miguel Layún	32	(Mexico) Monterrey	Undisclosed	
11 June 2021	MF	(Mexico) Fernando Madrigal	29	(Mexico) Querétaro	Undisclosed	
16 June 2021	DF	(Mexico) Salvador Reyes	23	(Mexico) Puebla	Undisclosed	
16 August 2021	MF	(Mexico) Mario Osuna	32	Free agent		
18 August 2021	MF	(Ecuador) Renato Ibarra	30	(Mexico) Atlas	Loan return	

==== Out ====
Date	Pos.	Player	Age	To	Fee	Source
15 June 2021	FW	(Mexico) Giovani dos Santos	32	Released		
15 June 2021	FW	(Paraguay) Sergio Díaz	23	(Spain) Real Madrid Castilla	End of loan	
22 June 2021	MF	(Mexico) Alan Medina	23	(Mexico) Toluca	End of loan	
23 June 2021	DF	(Mexico) Ramón Juárez	20	(Mexico) Puebla	Loan	
23 June 2021	MF	(Mexico) Emilio Sánchez	26	(Mexico) Mazatlán	Loan	
30 June 2021	DF	(Mexico) Bryan Colula	25	(Mexico) Mazatlán	Loan	
1 July 2021	DF	(Mexico) Alonso Escoboza	28	(Mexico) Necaxa	Loan	
26 August 2021	FW	(Chile) Nicolás Castillo	28	(Brazil) Juventude	Loan	
2 September 2021	DF	(Mexico) Adrián Goransch	22	(Germany) Sportfreunde Lotte	Undisclosed	

=== Winter ===
==== In ====
Date	Pos.	Player	Age	From	Fee	Source
15 December 2021	MF	(Chile) Diego Valdés	27	(Mexico) Santos Laguna	Undisclosed	
23 December 2021	MF	(Mexico) Jonathan dos Santos	31	Free agent		
17 January 2022	MF	(Mexico) Alejandro Zendejas	23	(Mexico) Necaxa	US$3 million	
18 January 2022	DF	(Spain) Jorge Meré	24	(Germany) 1. FC Köln	Undisclosed	
26 January 2022	MF	(Colombia) Juan Ferney Otero	26	(Mexico) Santos Laguna	Undisclosed	

==== Out ====
Date	Pos.	Player	Age	To	Fee	Source
1 December 2021	FW	(Chile) Nicolás Castillo	28	Contract terminated		
16 December 2021	MF	(Colombia) Nicolás Benedetti	24	(Mexico) Mazatlán	Loan	
21 December 2021	MF	(Mexico) Sebastián Córdova	24	(Mexico) Tigres UANL	Undisclosed	
21 December 2021	DF	(Mexico) Ramón Juárez	20	(Mexico) Atlético San Luis	Loan	
22 December 2021	MF	(Ecuador) Renato Ibarra	30	(Mexico) Tijuana	Loan	
28 December 2021	MF	(Mexico) Mario Osuna	33	Released		
8 January 2022	MF	(Argentina) Leonardo Suárez	25	(Mexico) Santos Laguna	On loan	
11 January 2022	DF	(Argentina) Emanuel Aguilera	32	(Mexico) Atlas	Undisclosed	
17 January 2022	MF	(Mexico) Fernando Madrigal	29	(Mexico) Necaxa	On loan	
17 January 2022	MF	(Guatemala) Antonio López	24	(Mexico) Necaxa	On loan	

== Pre-season and friendlies ==
Club América preceded their 2021–22 campaign by taking part in the "Tour Águila" in the United States, and mid-season friendlies against Guadalajara and Pumas UNAM.

Date	Opponents	H / A	Result F–A	Scorers
4 July 2021	Santos Laguna	N	1–0	Martínez 10'
7 July 2021	Atlas	N	1–0	Madrigal 46'
10 July 2021	UANL	N	1–0	Reyes 76'
5 September 2021	Guadalajara	N	2–0	Viñas 1'; Reyes 90 +5'
8 October 2021	UNAM	N	0–1	

== Competitions ==
=== Overview ===
Competition	First match	Last match	Starting round	Final position	Record							
Competition	First match	Last match	Starting round	Final position	Pld	W	D	L	GF	GA	GD	Win %
Apertura 2021	22 July 2021	27 November 2021	Matchday 1	Quarter-finals	19	10	6	3	22	13	+9	52.63
Clausura 2022	7 January 2022	22 May 2022	Matchday 1	Semi-finals	21	8	7	6	29	24	+5	38.10
Total					40	18	13	9	51	37	+14	45.00

Last updated: 22 May 2022
Source: Competitions

=== Liga MX ===
==== Apertura 2021 ====
Overall								Home						Away					
Pld	W	D	L	GF	GA	GD	Pts	W	D	L	GF	GA	GD	W	D	L	GF	GA	GD
19	10	6	3	22	13	+9	36	7	2	1	14	5	+9	3	4	2	8	8	0

Source: Match reports

==== Results by round ====
Round	1	2	3	4	5	6	7	8	9	10	11	12	13	14	15	16	17
Ground	A	H	H	A	A	H	A	H	A	H	A	H	A	H	H	A	H
Result	D	W	W	W	W	W	D	W	L	D	D	W	W	W	W	L	D
Position	8	7	4	1	1	1	1	1	1	1	1	1	1	1	1	1	1

Source: Match reports
A = Away; H = Home; W = Win; D = Draw; L = Loss

==== Clausura 2022 ====
Overall								Home						Away					
Pld	W	D	L	GF	GA	GD	Pts	W	D	L	GF	GA	GD	W	D	L	GF	GA	GD
21	8	7	6	29	24	+5	31	4	3	3	16	12	+4	4	4	3	13	12	+1

Source: Match reports

==== Results by round ====
Round	1	2	3	4	5	6	7	8	9	10	11	12	13	14	15	16	17
Ground	A	A	H	H	A	H	A	H	A	H	A	A	H	H	H	A	H
Result	D	L	L	L	W	L	D	D	L	D	W	W	W	W	W	W	D
Position	6	11	14	16	14	16	17	18	18	17	15	15	11	8	8	5	4

Source: Match reports
A = Away; H = Home; W = Win; D = Draw; L = Loss

== Apertura 2021 ==
=== Matches ===
==== Regular phase ====
22 July 2021 1	Querétaro	0–0	América	Querétaro
21:00 CT	Perg (yellow card) 26'; Torres (yellow card) 65'	Report	Martínez (yellow card) 32'; Chávez (yellow card) 88'	Stadium: Estadio Corregidora; Attendance: 10,221; Referee: Marco Antonio Ortíz Nava

31 July 2021 2	América	2–1	Necaxa	Mexico City
19:00 CT	Reyes 40'; Fidalgo 76'	Report	Zendejas 68'	Stadium: Estadio Azteca; Attendance: 9,590; Referee: Fernando Hernández Gómez

7 August 2021 3	América	2–0	Puebla	Mexico City
19:00 CT	Martínez 43' (pen.); Reyes 54'; Layún (yellow card) 64'; Aquino (yellow card) 76'	Report	Salas (yellow card) 64'; Escoto (yellow card) 74'	Stadium: Estadio Azteca; Attendance: 8,567; Referee: César Arturo Ramos Palazuelos

15 August 2021 4	Atlas	0–1	América	Guadalajara
17:00 CT	Rocha (yellow card) 71'	Report	Aguilera (red card) 57'; Córdova 77'; Martínez (penalty missed) 81'	Stadium: Estadio Jalisco; Attendance: 13,637; Referee: Jorge Antonio Pérez Durán

18 August 2021 5	Juárez	1–2	América	Juárez
21:00 CT	Galván 31'; Esquivel (yellow card) 33'; Esquivel (red card) 90+2'	Report	Aquino (yellow card) 30'; Martínez 32'; Fidalgo 52'	Stadium: Estadio Olímpico Benito Juárez; Attendance: 13,992; Referee: Luis Enrique Santander Aguirre

22 August 2021 6	América	2–0	Tijuana	Mexico City
17:00 CT	Córdova 90+1' (pen.); Ibarra 90+4'	Report	Rivera (yellow card) 16'; Angulo (yellow card) 18'; Loroña (yellow card) 79'; Gamíz (red card) 90'	Stadium: Estadio Azteca; Attendance: 11,655; Referee: Jorge Isaac Rojas Castillo

28 August 2021 7	León	1–1	América	León
21:00 CT	Dávila 26'; Tesillo (yellow card) 31'; Barreiro (yellow card) 52'; Ramírez (yellow card) 86'	Report	Aguilera 10' (pen.); Fidalgo (yellow card) 12'; Aquino (yellow card) 29'; Córdova (yellow card) 47'; R. Sánchez (red card) 65'	Stadium: Estadio León; Attendance: 12,719; Referee: Marco Antonio Ortíz Nava

11 September 2021 8	América	2–0	Mazatlán	Mexico City
21:00 CT	Fidalgo 29'; Fuentes (yellow card) 39'; Madrigal 72'	Report	Colula (yellow card) 12'; Díaz (yellow card) 45+2'; Vikonis (yellow card) 67'	Stadium: Estadio Azteca; Attendance: 14,637; Referee: Diego Montaño Robles

18 September 2021 9	Toluca	3–1	América	Toluca
19:00 CT	Ortega 2', 61'; Baeza (yellow card) 22' (yellow-red card) 56'; Samudio 38'; Diego (yellow card) 49'; González (yellow card) 80'; Sambueza (yellow card) 90'	Report	Martín 6'; Viñas (yellow card) 11'; Valdez (yellow card) 45+1'; Layún (yellow card) 64'; Cáceres (yellow card) 79' (yellow-red card) 84'; Madrigal (yellow card) 83'; Ochoa (yellow card) 83'	Stadium: Estadio Nemesio Diez; Attendance: 10,297; Referee: Jorge Isaac Rojas Castillo

25 September 2021 10	América	0–0	Guadalajara	Mexico City
21:00 CT	Martín (yellow card) 45+1'	Report	Ponce (yellow card) 45+1'; Vega (yellow card) 68'	Stadium: Estadio Azteca; Attendance: 42,862; Referee: César Arturo Ramos Palazuelos

28 September 2021 11	Pachuca	1–1	América	Pachuca
21:00 CT	Cabral 32'; Ibáñez (yellow card) 84'	Report	Reyes 45'; Aguilera (yellow card) 69'	Stadium: Estadio Hidalgo; Attendance: 7,454; Referee: Fernando Guerrero Ramírez

3 October 2021 12	América	2–0	UNAM	Mexico City
17:00 CT	R. Sánchez 35'; Aquino (yellow card) 44'; Layún (yellow card) 55'; Lainez 90+8'	Report	Ortiz (yellow card) 44'; Meritão (yellow card) 52'; Dinenno (yellow card) 59'	Stadium: Estadio Azteca; Attendance: 27,571; Referee: Jorge Antonio Pérez Durán

16 October 2021 13	Atlético San Luis	0–1	América	San Luis Potosí
19:00 CT	Chávez (yellow card) 17'; Piñuelas (yellow card) 60'; Díaz (yellow card) 63'	Report	Benedetti (yellow card) 43'; Martínez 90+6'	Stadium: Estadio Alfonso Lastras; Attendance: 16,373; Referee: Diego Montaño Robles

19 October 2021 14	América	2–1	Santos Laguna	Mexico City
19:00 CT	Valdez (yellow card) 31'; Fidalgo 67'; Layún (yellow card) 76'; Martínez (yellow card) 86'; Córdova 86'; Osuna (yellow card) 90'	Report	Campos (yellow card) 38'; Dória (yellow card) 47'; Gorriarán 72' (pen.); Valdés (red card) 76'; Ojeco (yellow card) 90'	Stadium: Estadio Azteca; Attendance: 16,918; Referee: Marco Antonio Ortíz Nava

23 October 2021 15	América	1–0	UANL	Mexico City
19:00 CT	Martín 53'; Benedetti (yellow card) 65'	Report	Carioca (yellow card) 28'	Stadium: Estadio Azteca; Attendance: 32,675; Referee: Fernando Guerrero Ramírez

31 October 2021 16	Cruz Azul	2–1	América	Mexico City
17:00 CT	Baca (yellow card) 15'; Alvarado 45'; Rodríguez 90+7' (pen.)	Report	Aguilera (yellow card) 37' (yellow-red card) 90+6'; Viñas 52'; Benedetti (yellow card) 70'	Stadium: Estadio Azteca; Attendance: 31,257; Referee: Luis Enrique Santander Aguirre

6 November 2021 17	América	0–0	Monterrey	Mexico City
19:00 CT	Martínez (yellow card) 59'	Report	A. Montes (red card) 67'; Rodríguez (yellow card) 78'	Stadium: Estadio Azteca; Attendance: 25,654; Referee: Diego Montaño Robles

==== Liguilla ====
===== Quarter-finals =====
24 November 2021 First leg	UNAM	0–0	América	Mexico City, Mexico
21:00 CT	Dinenno (yellow card) 29'	Report	Cáceres (yellow card) 39'	Stadium: Estadio Olímpico Universitario; Attendance: 42,684; Referee: Jorge Antonio Pérez Durán

27 November 2021 Second leg	América	1–3 (1–3 agg.)	UNAM	Mexico City, Mexico
19:00 CT	Aguilera 10'; Martínez (yellow card) 83'	Report	Corozo 28', 41' (yellow card) 57'; Velarde (yellow card) 52'; Meritão 81'; Moreno (yellow card) 87'	Stadium: Estadio Azteca; Attendance: 51,302; Referee: Marco Antonio Ortiz Nava

== Clausura 2022 ==
=== Matches ===
==== Regular phase ====
7 January 2022 1	Puebla	1–1	América	Puebla
21:00 CT	Reyes (yellow card) 22'; Araújo 33'; de Buen (yellow card) 59'; Ferrareis (yellow card) 74'; Cortizo (yellow card) 90+1'	Report	Reyes 1'; J.Sánchez (yellow card) 11'; Solari (red card) 31'; Martínez (yellow card) 32' (yellow-red card) 35'	Stadium: Estadio Cuauhtémoc; Attendance: 35,040; Referee: Oscar Mejia Garcia

16 February 2022 2	Mazatlán	2–1	América	Mazatlán
19:00 CT	Sosa 10'; Meraz (yellow card) 17'; Sansores 32' (yellow card) 42'; Y. Nogueira (yellow card) 90+8'; Padilla (yellow card) 90+8' (yellow-red card) 90+11'	Report	Otero 90+2'; Martínez (yellow card) 90+8'; Viñas (yellow card) 90+8'	Stadium: Estadio de Mazatlán; Attendance: 13,934; Referee: Jorge Antonio Pérez Durán

22 January 2022 3	América	0–2	Atlas	Mexico City
21:00 CT	J.Sánchez (yellow card) 27'; R.Sánchez (yellow card) 76'; Viñas (red card) 77'	Report	Rocha (yellow card) 7'; Barbosa (yellow card) 38' (goal) 69'; Quiñones (yellow card) 51'; Zaldívar (yellow card) 83'; Herrera 90+5'	Stadium: Estadio Azteca; Attendance: 20,825; Referee: Marco Antonio Ortiz Nava

5 February 2022 4	América	2–3	Atlético San Luis	Mexico City
19:00 CT	Silva (yellow card) 51'; Layún (yellow card) 28' (yellow-red card) 84'; Martínez 89'; Martín 90+3'	Report	Bilbao 5'; Chávez (yellow card) 26'; Díaz (yellow card) 28'; Barovero (yellow card) 29'; Sanabria (yellow card) 39'; Sambueza (yellow card) 45'; Hernández 53'; Berterame 60'; Muñoz (yellow card) 87'; Waller (yellow card) 90+5'	Stadium: Estadio Azteca; Attendance: 16,968; Referee: Adonai Escobedo González

12 February 2022 5	Santos Laguna	2–3	América	Torreón
21:00 CT	Valdez 9' (o.g.); Cervantes (yellow card) 20'; Dória 41'	Report	Valdés 12' (yellow card) 30'; Valdez (yellow card) 17' (goal) 56' (pen.); Reyes 45+2'; Silva (yellow card) 58'	Stadium: Estadio Corona; Attendance: 18,774; Referee: Luis Enrique Santander Aguirre

20 February 2022 6	América	1–3	Pachuca	Mexico City
19:00 CT	Valdez (yellow card) 52'; Martín 55'	Report	Ibáñez 28'; Hurtado 40'; Chávez (yellow card) 59'; Ustari (yellow card) 62'; Guzmán 76'	Stadium: Estadio Azteca; Attendance: 27,858; Referee: Diego Montaño Gomez

26 February 2022 7	UNAM	0–0	América	Mexico City
21:00 CT	Diogo (yellow card) 77' (yellow-red card) 80'	Report	Valdez (yellow card) 51'	Stadium: Estadio Olímpico Universitario; Attendance: 42,650; Referee: Fernando Guerrero Ramírez

1 March 2022 8	América	1–1	Querétaro	Mexico City
21:00 CT	Valdez 4' (yellow card) 90+3'; Zendejas (yellow card) 39' (yellow-red card) 45+1'; Reyes (yellow card) 73'; dos Santos (yellow card) 90+6'	Report	Balanta (yellow card) 43'; Barrera (yellow card) 43'; Romagnoli (yellow card) 57'; Cristante (yellow card) 86'; Sepúlveda 90+4' (pen.)	Stadium: Estadio Azteca; Attendance: 17,414; Referee: Fernando Hernandez Gomez

5 March 2022 9	Monterrey	2–1	América	Guadalupe
19:06 CT	Montes (yellow card) 31'; Campbell 37'; Andrada (yellow card) 45'; Ortiz (yellow card) 45+1'; Funes Mori 49' (yellow card) 49'	Report	Fidalgo 33'; Silva (yellow card) 37'	Stadium: Estadio BBVA; Attendance: 40,327; Referee: Erick Yair Miranda Galindo

12 March 2022 10	Guadalajara	0–0	América	Guadalajara
21:00 CT	Mier (yellow card) 21'; Briseño (yellow card) 69'; Zaldívar (yellow card) 81'	Report	dos Santos (yellow card) 24' (yellow-red card) 50'	Stadium: Estadio Akron; Attendance: 33,047; Referee: Jorge Antonio Pérez Durán

20 March 2022 11	América	3–0	Toluca	Mexico City
19:00 CT	Martínez 6'; Valdés 14'; Zendejas 17'	Report	Huerta (yellow card) 11'; Baeza (yellow card) 13'; Fernández (yellow card) 66'	Stadium: Estadio Azteca; Attendance: 34,571; Referee: Oscar Mejia Garcia

2 April 2022 12	Necaxa	0–1	América	Aguascalientes
19:00 CT	Domínguez (yellow card) 45+3'; Malagón (yellow card) 62'; Peña (yellow card) 72'; García (yellow card) 89'	Report	Valdez (yellow card) 44'; Meré (yellow card) 81'; Valdés 90'	Stadium: Estadio Victoria; Attendance: 19,485; Referee: Daniel Quintero Huitrón

9 April 2022 13	América	3–0	Juárez	Mexico City
21:00 CT	Zendejas 27'; Viñas 30'; Martínez (yellow card) 66'; Valdés 90+1'	Report	Arribas (yellow card) 12'; García (yellow card) 68'; Mora (yellow card) 68'	Stadium: Estadio Azteca; Attendance: 19,757; Referee: César Arturo Ramos Palazuelos

15 April 2022 14	Tijuana	1–3	América	Tijuana
22:00 CT	Montecinos 31'; López (yellow card) 70'; Loroña (yellow card) 79'; Angulo (yellow card) 90+2'	Report	Ferreyra 7' (o.g.); Zendejas 10' (yellow card) 42'; Martínez (yellow card) 39'; Fidalgo 84' (pen.)	Stadium: Estadio Caliente; Attendance: 27,333; Referee: Luis Enrique Santander Aguirre

20 April 2022 15	América	2–0	León	Mexico City
22:00 CT	R. Sánchez 8'; Martínez (yellow card) 18'; Meré (yellow card) 45+5'; Zendejas 65'; Layún (yellow card) 78'	Report	Mena (yellow card) 5'; J. Rodríguez (yellow card) 7' (yellow-red card) 45'; Tesillo (yellow card) 45+7' (yellow-red card) 85'; Dávila (red card) 55'	Stadium: Estadio Azteca; Attendance: 36,210; Referee: Diego Montaño Robles

23 April 2022 16	UANL	0–2	América	Nuevo León
20:00 CT	Aquino (yellow card) 6'; Pizarro (red card) 88'; Gignac (yellow card) 88'; Guzmán (yellow card) 90+3'; López (yellow card) 90+4'	Report	Valdés 31'; Martínez (yellow card) 67'; Reyes (yellow card) 69'; Martín 90+2' (yellow card) 90+3'	Stadium: Estadio Universitario; Attendance: 38,810; Referee: Fernando Hernandez Gomez

30 April 2022 17	América	0–0	Cruz Azul	Mexico City
22:00 CT	Aquino (yellow card) 10'; R. Sánchez (yellow card) 33'; Fidalgo (yellow card) 39'; Cáceres (yellow card) 84'	Report	Escobar (yellow card) 32'; Morales (yellow card) 33'	Stadium: Estadio Azteca; Attendance: 52,630; Referee: Oscar Macías Romo

==== Liguilla ====
===== Quarter-finals =====
10 May 2022 First leg	Puebla	1–1	América	Puebla
21:05 CT	Salas (yellow card) 21'; Parra (yellow card) 32'; Aristeguieta 55'; Aguilar (yellow card) 71'; de Buen (yellow card) 90'	Report	Cáceres (yellow card) 36' (goal) 78'; Valdez (yellow card) 58'	Stadium: Estadio Cuauhtémoc; Attendance: 43,921; Referee: Luis Enrique Santander Aguirre

14 May 2022 Second leg	América	3–2 (4–3 agg.)	Puebla	Mexico City
19:00 CT	Zendejas (yellow card) 33' (goal) 73'; Martín 42'; Valdés 58' (pen.)	Report	Araújo (yellow card) 29'; Segovia (yellow card) 34'; Reyes 45+2'; Silva (yellow card) 52'; Salas (yellow card) 88'; Aristeguieta 90+4' (pen.)	Stadium: Estadio Azteca; Attendance: 51,186; Referee: Fernando Guerrero Ramirez

===== Semi-finals =====
19 May 2022 First leg	América	1–1	Pachuca	Mexico City
21:00 CT	Valdés 54'; Fidalgo (yellow card) 74'; J. Sánchez (yellow card) 80'	Report	Almada (yellow card) 25'; Tapias (yellow card) 70'; Ibáñez 82' (pen.)	Stadium: Estadio Azteca; Attendance: 62,633; Referee: Jorge Antonio Pérez Durán

== 2021 CONCACAF Champions League ==
The 2021 CONCACAF Champions League began during the 2020–21 Liga MX season.

=== Round of 16 ===
The round of 16 was played during the 2020–21 season.

=== Quarter-finals ===
The quarter-final was played during the 2020–21 season.

=== Semi-finals ===
12 August 2021 Semi-finals	América (Mexico)	2–0	(United States) Philadelphia Union	Mexico City, Mexico
21:00 CDT	R. Sánchez 17'; Aguilera 80' (pen.)	Report	Martínez (yellow card) 34'	Stadium: Estadio Azteca; Referee: Walter López Castellanos (Guatemala)

15 September 2021 Semi-finals	Philadelphia Union (United States)	0–2 (0–4 agg.)	(Mexico) América	Chester, United States
21:00 EDT	Glesnes (yellow card) 19'; Bedoya (yellow card) 27'; Wagner (yellow card) 27'; Martínez (yellow card) 27'; Monteiro (yellow card) 45+2', (penalty missed) 50'	Report	Córdova (yellow card) 31'; Valdez (yellow card) 49'; J. Sánchez (yellow card) 72'; Benedetti 79'; Martín 90+3'	Stadium: Subaru Park; Referee: Said Martínez (Honduras)

=== Final ===
28 October 2021 Final	Monterrey (Mexico)	1–0	(Mexico) América	Guadalupe, Mexico
21:00 CDT	Funes Mori 9'; Ortiz (yellow card) 39'; Medina (yellow card) 90+10'	Report	Cáceres (yellow card) 21'; Reyes (yellow card) 59'; Martínez (yellow card) 68'; J. Sánchez (yellow card) 90+10'	Stadium: Estadio BBVA; Referee: Fernando Hernández Gómez
