= 2022–23 Club América season =

América
2022–23 season
- President: Santiago Baños
- Manager: Fernando Ortiz
- Stadium: Estadio Azteca
- Apertura 2022: Regular phase: 1st Final phase: Semi-finals
- Clausura 2023: Regular phase: 2nd Final phase: Semi-finals
- Top goalscorer: League: Apertura: Henry Martín (13); Clausura: Henry Martín (14); All: Henry Martín (27)
Home colours	Away colours	Third colours
- All statistics correct as of 22 May 2023.

The 2022–23 Club América season was the club's 78th consecutive season in the top-flight of Mexican football. The team participated in the Liga MX.

== Coaching staff ==
Position	Staff
Manager	(Argentina) Fernando Ortiz
Assistant managers	(Mexico) Raúl Lara
Assistant managers	(Mexico) Juan Pablo Rodríguez
Assistant managers	(Mexico) Peter Thelemaque
Goalkeeper coach	(Mexico) Luis Gurrola
Fitness coaches	(Mexico) Francisco Martínez
Fitness coaches	(Canada) Paolo Pacione
Physiotherapists	(Argentina) Fernando Gilardi
Physiotherapists	(Mexico) Octavio Luna
Physiotherapists	(Mexico) Francisco Faustino
Team doctors	(Mexico) Alfonso Díaz
Team doctors	(Mexico) José Guadalupe Vázquez
Team doctors	(Argentina) Christian Motta

Source: Club América

== Players ==
=== Squad information ===
No.	Pos.	Nat.	Name	Date of birth (age)	Since	Previous club
Goalkeepers
27	GK	(Mexico)	Óscar Jiménez	12 October 1988 (age 37)	2017	(Mexico) Chiapas
33	GK	(Mexico)	Luis Malagón	2 March 1997 (age 28)	2023	(Mexico) Necaxa
35	GK	(Mexico)	Fernando Tapia	17 July 2001 (age 24)	2022	Academy
Defenders
2	DF	(Mexico)	Luis Fuentes	14 September 1986 (age 39)	2020	Free agent
3	DF	(Mexico)	Israel Reyes	23 May 2000 (age 25)	2023	(Mexico) Puebla
4	DF	(Uruguay)	Sebastián Cáceres	18 August 1999 (age 26)	2020	(Uruguay) Liverpool
14	DF	(Mexico)	Néstor Araujo	29 August 1991 (age 34)	2022	(Spain) Celta de Vigo
19	DF	(Mexico)	Miguel Layún	25 June 1988 (age 37)	2021	(Mexico) Monterrey
23	DF	(Mexico)	Emilio Lara	18 May 2002 (age 23)	2022	Academy
26	DF	(Mexico)	Salvador Reyes	4 May 1998 (age 27)	2021	(Mexico) Puebla
Midfielders
5	MF	(Peru)	Pedro Aquino	13 April 1995 (age 30)	2021	(Mexico) León
6	MF	(Mexico)	Jonathan dos Santos	26 April 1990 (age 35)	2022	Free agent
8	MF	(Spain)	Álvaro Fidalgo	9 April 1997 (age 28)	2021	(Spain) Castellón
10	MF	(Chile)	Diego Valdés	30 January 1994 (age 32)	2021	(Mexico) Santos Laguna
17	MF	(United States)	Alejandro Zendejas	7 February 1998 (age 27)	2022	(Mexico) Necaxa
20	MF	(Paraguay)	Richard Sánchez	29 March 1996 (age 29)	2019	(Paraguay) Olimpia
25	MF	(Mexico)	Jürgen Damm	7 November 1992 (age 33)	2022	Free agent
32	MF	(Argentina)	Leonardo Suárez	30 March 1996 (age 29)	2020	(Spain) Villarreal
Forwards
7	FW	(Uruguay)	Brian Rodríguez	20 May 2000 (age 25)	2022	(United States) LAFC
9	FW	(Colombia)	Roger Martínez	23 June 1994 (age 31)	2018	(China) Jiangsu Suning
11	FW	(Uruguay)	Jonathan Rodríguez	6 July 1993 (age 32)	2022	(Saudi Arabia) Al-Nassr
21	FW	(Mexico)	Henry Martín	18 September 1992 (age 33)	2018	(Mexico) Tijuana
24	FW	(Uruguay)	Federico Viñas	30 June 1998 (age 27)	2019	(Uruguay) Juventud

Players and squad numbers last updated on 7 January 2023.
Note: Flags indicate national team as has been defined under FIFA eligibility rules. Players may hold more than one non-FIFA nationality.}

== Transfers ==
=== Summer ===
==== In ====
Date	Pos.	Player	Age	From	Fee	Source
21 June 2022	FW	(Uruguay) Jonathan Rodríguez	28	(Saudi Arabia) Al Nassr	Undisclosed (Note: Reportedly US$6 million.)	
23 June 2022	DF	(Mexico) Néstor Araujo	30	(Spain) Celta de Vigo	Undisclosed (Note: Reportedly US$2.7 million plus variables.)	
23 June 2022	MF	(Mexico) Jürgen Damm	29	Free agent		
24 August 2022	FW	(Uruguay) Brian Rodríguez	22	(United States) LAFC	Undisclosed (Note: Reportedly US$6 million.)	

==== Out ====
Date	Pos.	Player	Age	To	Fee	Source
24 June 2022	MF	(Mexico) Mauro Lainez	26	(Mexico) Juárez	Undisclosed	
8 July 2022	FW	(Colombia) Juan Otero	27	(Spain) Sporting de Gijón	On loan	
4 August 2022	DF	(Spain) Jorge Meré	25	(Mexico) Mazatlán	On loan	
7 August 2022	DF	(Mexico) Jorge Sánchez	24	(Netherlands) Ajax	Undisclosed	
9 August 2022	MF	(Mexico) Santiago Naveda	21	(Poland) Miedź Legnica	On loan	

=== Winter ===
==== In ====
Date	Pos.	Player	Age	From	Fee	Source
1 December 2022	DF	(Mexico) Israel Reyes	22	(Mexico) Puebla	Undisclosed	
21 December 2022	GK	(Mexico) Luis Malagón	25	(Mexico) Necaxa	Undisclosed	

==== Out ====
Date	Pos.	Player	Age	To	Fee	Source
23 December 2022	GK	(Mexico) Guillermo Ochoa	37	(Italy) Salernitana	Released	
23 December 2022	MF	(Colombia) Nicolás Benedetti	25	(Mexico) Mazatlán	Undisclosed (Note: Previously on loan.)	
7 January 2023	DF	(Paraguay) Bruno Valdez	30	Released (Note: Eventually joined Boca Juniors.)		
31 January 2023	DF	(Spain) Jorge Meré	25	(Spain) Cádiz	On loan	

== Pre-season and friendlies ==
Club América will precede their 2022–23 campaign by taking part in the "Tour Águila" in the United States, and will play a series of mid-season friendlies, including the 2022 Leagues Cup Showcase, and the Copa Sky.

Date	Opponents	H / A	Result F–A	Scorers
19 June 2022	(Mexico) UNAM	N	1–3	D. Valdés 91'
22 June 2022	(Mexico) León	N	5–2	R. Sánchez 10', D. Valdés 23', 41', R. Martínez 37', A. Zendejas 56'
16 July 2022	(England) Chelsea	N	1–2	James 60' (o.g.)
20 July 2022	(England) Manchester City	N	1–2	H. Martín 43'
26 July 2022	(Spain) Real Madrid	N	2–2	H. Martín 5', Á. Fidalgo 82' (pen.)
3 August 2022	(United States) LAFC	N	0–0 (6–5 p)	
21 September 2022	(United States) Nashville SC	A	3–3 (2–4 p)	J. Damm 38', M. Layún 51', R. Martínez 90+5'
25 September 2022	(Mexico) Guadalajara	N	3–1	I. Moreno 10', J. Damm 57', Dos Santos 72'
5 October 2022	(Mexico) Atlante	H	Cancelled	
11 December 2022	(Mexico) Cancún	A	0–2	D. Valdés 29', J. Rodríguez 87'
15 December 2022	(Mexico) Necaxa	N	3–3	B. Rodríguez 38', J. Rodríguez 42' (pen.), R. Martínez 62'
19 December 2022	(Mexico) Toluca	N	0–2	J. Rodríguez 26', B. Rodríguez 34'
23 December 2022	(Mexico) UNAM	N	0–2	
27 December 2022	(Mexico) Cruz Azul	N	1–2	S. Reyes 57'
23 March 2023	(Mexico) Santos Laguna	N	0–0	
26 March 2023	(Mexico) Tijuana	N	2–1	E. Soria 26', E. Lozano 84'

== Competitions ==
=== Overview ===
Competition	First match	Last match	Starting round	Final position	Record							
Competition	First match	Last match	Starting round	Final position	Pld	W	D	L	GF	GA	GD	Win %
Apertura 2022	2 July 2022	22 October 2022	Matchday 1	Semi-finals	21	14	3	4	51	22	+29	66.67
Clausura 2023	7 January 2023	22 May 2023	Matchday 1	Semi-finals	21	11	7	3	42	27	+15	52.38
Total					42	25	10	7	93	49	+44	59.52

Last updated: 23 May 2023
Source: Competitions

==== Apertura 2022 ====
Overall								Home						Away					
Pld	W	D	L	GF	GA	GD	Pts	W	D	L	GF	GA	GD	W	D	L	GF	GA	GD
21	14	3	4	51	22	+29	45	7	3	0	26	8	+18	7	0	4	25	14	+11

Source: Match reports

==== Results by round ====
Round	1	2	3	4	5	6	7	8	9	10	11	12	13	14	15	16	17
Ground	H	A	H	A	A	H	A	A	H	A	A	H	H	A	H	H	A
Result	D	L	W	L	L	W	W	W	W	W	W	W	W	W	D	W	W
Position	4	13	11	15	15	15	9	5	4	4	2	1	1	1	1	1	1

Source: Match reports
A = Away; H = Home; W = Win; D = Draw; L = Loss

==== Clausura 2023 ====
Overall								Home						Away					
Pld	W	D	L	GF	GA	GD	Pts	W	D	L	GF	GA	GD	W	D	L	GF	GA	GD
21	11	7	3	42	27	+15	40	4	4	3	19	16	+3	7	3	0	23	11	+12

Source: Match reports

==== Results by round ====
Round	1	2	3	4	5	6	7	8	9	10	11	12	13	14	15	16	17
Ground	H	A	H	H	A	H	A	H	A	H	A	A	H	H	A	H	A
Result	D	D	D	W	D	W	W	W	D	L	W	W	D	W	W	D	W
Position	9	12	11	7	8	4	4	3	5	6	5	3	4	3	2	2	2

Source: Match reports
A = Away; H = Home; W = Win; D = Draw; L = Loss

== Apertura 2022 ==
=== League table ===
Pos	Team	Pld	W	D	L	GF	GA	GD	Pts	Qualification
1	América	17	12	2	3	37	16	+21	38	Qualification for the quarter-finals
2	Monterrey	17	10	5	2	29	13	+16	35	Qualification for the quarter-finals
3	Santos Laguna	17	10	3	4	38	21	+17	33	Qualification for the quarter-finals
4	Pachuca (C)	17	9	5	3	28	15	+13	32	Qualification for the quarter-finals
5	UANL	17	9	3	5	24	14	+10	30	Qualification for the reclassification

Source: Liga MX
Rules for classification: 1) Points; 2) Goal difference; 3) Number of goals scored; 4) Head-to-head results between tied teams; 5) Number of goals scored away; 6) Highest relegation coefficient; 7) Fair Play points
(C) Champions

=== Matches ===
==== Regular phase ====
2 July 2022 1	América	0–0	Atlas	Mexico City
21:05 CT	R. Martinez (yellow card) 39'	Report	Rocha (yellow card) 26'	Stadium: Estadio Azteca; Attendance: 27,577; Referee: Fernando Guerrero Ramírez

9 July 2022 2	Monterrey	3–2	América	Nuevo León
21:05 CT	Medina 8'; Vegas (yellow card) 64'; Meza 65'; Aguirre 73'; Pizarro (yellow card) 90+6'	Report	Rodríguez 21'; Zendejas 34'; Araujo (yellow card) 35'; Aquino (yellow card) 38'	Stadium: Estadio BBVA; Attendance: 41,342; Referee: Marco Antonio Ortiz Nava

13 July 2022 3	América	1–0	Toluca	Mexico City
21:00 CT	R. Sánchez (yellow card) 35' (goal) 90+4'	Report	Baeza (red card) 30'	Stadium: Estadio Azteca; Attendance: 36,090; Referee: Adonai Escobedo González

23 July 2022 4	Tijuana	2–0	América	Baja California
21:05 CT	López 8' (pen.) (yellow card) 67'; Rodríguez (yellow card) 24'; Díaz (yellow card) 45'; Montecinos 61'	Report	J. Sánchez (yellow card) 10'; Zendejas (yellow card) 12'; Araujo (yellow card) 63'	Stadium: Estadio Caliente; Attendance: 29,333; Referee: Fernando Hernandez Gomez

31 July 2022 6	León	3–2	América	Guanajuato
21:05 CT	Castillo (yellow card) 20'; Dávila 31'; O. Rodríguez 65'; Mena (yellow card) 76' (goal) 90+16' (pen.); J. I. Rodríguez (red card) 88'	Report	Lara (yellow card) 22'; Aquino (yellow card) 28'; Martín 45+5' 80'; Valdés (yellow card) 49'	Stadium: Estadio León; Attendance: 20,964; Referee: Oscar Macías Romo

7 August 2022 7	América	2–1	Juárez	Mexico City
21:05 CT	Zendejas (yellow card) 12'; Martín 59' 63'; Layún (yellow card) 78'	Report	Salcedo (yellow card) 72'; Medina 89'	Stadium: Estadio Azteca; Attendance: 21,957; Referee: Luis Enrique Santander

13 August 2022 8	UNAM	0–3	América	Mexico City
19:05 CT	Freire (yellow card) 43'; López (yellow card) 74'	Report	Valdés 37'; Rodríguez 56'; Zendejas 77'	Stadium: Estadio Olímpico Universitario; Attendance: 45,893; Referee: Adonai Escobedo González

17 August 2022 9	Pachuca	0–3	América	Hidalgo
21:05 CT	Ibáñez (yellow card) 9'; Tapias (yellow card) 20'; Ibarra (red card) 41'; J. Hernández (yellow card) 70'	Report	Valdez (yellow card) 29'; Zendejas 33'; Rodríguez 48'; Martín 75'	Stadium: Estadio Hidalgo; Attendance: 10,938; Referee: César Arturo Ramos Palazuelos

20 August 2022 10	América	7–0	Cruz Azul	Mexico City
21:05 CT	R. Sánchez 14'; Rodríguez 22'; Valdés 45+9'; Martín 53'; Fidalgo 73'; Viñas 85'; Reyes 90'	Report	Rotondi (yellow card) 45+5'; Baca (red card) 45+7'	Stadium: Estadio Azteca; Attendance: 45,693; Referee: Luis Enrique Santander

23 August 2022 16 (Note: Rescheduled match.)	Querétaro	0–1	América	Querétaro
21:05 CT		Report	Lara 47'; Aquino (yellow card) 52'; dos Santos (yellow card) 59'	Stadium: Estadio Corregidora; Attendance: 0 Referee: Víctor Alfonso Caceres Hernandez

27 August 2022 11	Mazatlán	1–3	América	Mazatlán
20:05 CT	Valdés 10' (o.g.); Vargas (yellow card) 33' (yellow-red card) 57'; Fabián (yellow card) 37'; Intriago (yellow card) 43'	Report	Cáceres (yellow card) 13' (goal) 48'; Valdés 38'; Martín 44'; Zendejas (yellow card) 67'	Stadium: Estadio de Mazatlán; Attendance: 18,365; Referee: Erik Yair Miranda Galindo

3 September 2022 12	América	2–1	UANL	Mexico City
21:05 CT	Rodríguez 1' (yellow card) 33'; Zendejas (yellow card) 32' (goal) 45+1'; Layún (yellow card) 33'; Viñas (yellow card) 36'	Report	Lichnovsky (yellow card) 2'; Gignac 9'; Pizarro (yellow card) 33'; Vigón (yellow card) 33'	Stadium: Estadio Azteca; Attendance: 45,384; Referee: Diego Montaño Robles

6 September 2022 13	América	3–0	Atlético San Luis	Mexico City
21:05 CT	Aquino (yellow card) 32'; Rodríguez 45'; Valdés 53'; Martín 55'; Zendejas (yellow card) 66'	Report	Barovero (yellow card) 54'; J.P. Martínez (yellow card) 65'; León (yellow card) 72'; González (yellow card) 90+1'	Stadium: Estadio Azteca; Attendance: 20,410; Referee: Victor Alfonso Caceres Hernandez

10 September 2022 14	Necaxa	1–2	América	Aguascalientes
19:00 CT	Batista 7'; Segovia (yellow card) 66'; Godínez (yellow card) 90'	Report	dos Santos 57'; Martínez 74'	Stadium: Estadio Victoria; Attendance: 20,193; Referee: Fernando Guerrero Ramírez

14 September 2022 5	América	3–3	Santos Laguna	Mexico City
21:05 CT	Martín 8'; H.Rodríguez 87' (o.g.); Viñas 90+7'	Report	Suárez 7' 16'; Preciado (yellow card) 22' (goal) 62'; H.Rodríguez (yellow card) 25'; Campos (yellow card) 73'; Gorriarán (yellow card) 90+2'; Domínguez (yellow card) 97'; Maidana (red card) 98'	Stadium: Estadio Azteca; Attendance: 27,821; Referee: Fernando Hernandez Gomez

17 September 2022 15	América	2–1	Guadalajara	Mexico City
20:05 CT	Martín 4' (pen.); Zendejas 51'; Cáceres (yellow card) 90+6'	Report	Vega (yellow card) 23'; Calderón 62'; Zaldívar (yellow card) 90+6'; Beltrán (red card) 90+7'	Stadium: Estadio Azteca; Attendance: 65,461; Referee: Adonai Escobedo González

30 September 2022 17	Puebla	1–2	América	Puebla
19:00 CT	Reyes (yellow card) 20' (goal) 90+4'; Arce (red card) 21'	Report	Martínez 13'; Thelemaque (red card) 21'; Arajuo (yellow card) 81'; Fidalgo 89'	Stadium: Estadio Cuauhtémoc; Attendance: 43,632; Referee: Marco Antonio Ortiz Nava

=== Goalscorers ===
==== Regular phase ====
Position	Nation	Name	Goals scored
1.	(Mexico)	Henry Martín	10
2.	(Uruguay)	Jonathan Rodríguez	6
3.	(United States)	Alejandro Zendejas	5
4.	(Chile)	Diego Valdés	4
5.	(Spain)	Álvaro Fidalgo	2
5.	(Colombia)	Roger Martínez	2
5.	(Paraguay)	Richard Sánchez	2
5.	(Uruguay)	Federico Viñas	2
9.	(Uruguay)	Sebastián Cáceres	1
9.	(Mexico)	Jonathan dos Santos	1
9.	(Mexico)	Emilio Lara	1
9.	(Mexico)	Salvador Reyes	1
13.		Own goal	1
Total			38

=== Liguilla ===
==== Quarter-finals ====
12 October 2022 First leg	Puebla	1–6	América	Puebla
19:30 CT	Cortizo 14'; Martínez (yellow card) 80'	Report	Valdés 31'; Martín 33' 57'; Fuentes (yellow card) 55'; R. Sánchez (yellow card) 61'; Zendejas 65'; B. Rodríguez 77'; Viñas 90+2'	Stadium: Estadio Cuauhtémoc; Attendance: 44,471; Referee: Marco Antonio Ortiz Nava

15 October 2022 Second leg	América	5–1 (11–2 agg.)	Puebla	Mexico City
20:06 CT	B. Rodríguez 21'; Martín 27'; dos Santos (yellow card) 35'; Martínez 50'; Fidalgo 60'; Damm (yellow card) 80'; Layún 85' (pen.)	Report	Araújo 35'; Mancuello (yellow card) 83'	Stadium: Estadio Azteca; Attendance: 44,298; Referee: Daniel Quintero Huitrón

==== Semi-finals ====
19 October 2022 First leg	Toluca	2–1	América	Toluca
21:06 CT	Ortega 23' (yellow card) 26'; Guzmán (yellow card) 31'; Fernández 41' (pen.)	Report	R. Sánchez (yellow card) 22'; Aquino (yellow card) 60'; Lara 78'	Stadium: Estadio Nemesio Díez; Attendance: 27,273; Referee: Marco Antonio Ortiz Nava

22 October 2022 Second leg	América	1–1 (2–3 agg.)	Toluca	Mexico City
20:06 CT	R. Sánchez (yellow card) 24'; Fuentes (yellow card) 27'; Zendejas 35'; Martín (yellow card) 90+5'	Report	Ruiz (yellow card) 6'; Torres Nilo (yellow card) 19' (goal) 29'; Baeza (yellow card) 41'; Meneses (yellow card) 66'; Volpi (yellow card) 69'	Stadium: Estadio Azteca; Attendance: 62,945; Referee: Adonai Escobedo González

=== Goalscorers ===
==== Final phase ====
Position	Nation	Name	Goals scored
1.	(Mexico)	Henry Martín	3
2.	(Uruguay)	Brian Rodríguez	2
2.	(United States)	Alejandro Zendejas	2
3.	(Spain)	Álvaro Fidalgo	1
3.	(Mexico)	Emilio Lara	1
3.	(Mexico)	Miguel Layún	1
3.	(Colombia)	Roger Martínez	1
3.	(Chile)	Diego Valdés	1
3.	(Uruguay)	Federico Viñas	1
Total			13

== Clausura 2023 ==
=== League table ===
Pos	Team	Pld	W	D	L	GF	GA	GD	Pts	Qualification
1	Monterrey	17	13	1	3	35	14	+21	40	Qualification for the quarter-finals
2	América	17	9	7	1	36	21	+15	34	Qualification for the quarter-finals
3	Guadalajara	17	10	4	3	28	18	+10	34	Qualification for the quarter-finals
4	Toluca	17	9	5	3	34	19	+15	32	Qualification for the quarter-finals
5	Pachuca	17	10	1	6	32	22	+10	31	Qualification for the reclassification

Source: Liga MX
Rules for classification: 1) Points; 2) Goal difference; 3) Number of goals scored; 4) Head-to-head results between tied teams; 5) Number of goals scored away; 6) Highest relegation coefficient; 7) Fair Play points

=== Matches ===
==== Regular phase ====
7 January 2023 1	América	0–0	Querétaro	Mexico City
17:00 CT		Report	Alcalá (yellow card) 87'; Ayón (yellow card) 90+1'; Balanta (yellow card) 90+6'	Stadium: Estadio Azteca; Attendance: 25,856; Referee: Victor Alfonso Caceres Hernandez

14 January 2023 2	Toluca	2–2	América	Toluca
19:05 CT	González 9'; Orrantia 23' (yellow card) 89'; Baeza (yellow card) 41'	Report	B. Rodríguez 16'; Aquino (yellow card) 36'; Martín 76' (pen.)	Stadium: Estadio Nemesio Díez; Attendance: 27,273; Referee: Fernando Guerrero Ramírez

21 January 2023 3	América	2–2	Puebla	Mexico City
19:10 CT	Martín 37'; Zendejas 67'; I. Reyes (yellow card) 80'	Report	Ferrareis (yellow card) 34'; Maia (yellow card) 35'; Silva 60' (yellow card) 88'; Gularte 75' (yellow card) 76'; Silva (yellow card) 90+2'; Arce (yellow card) 90+5'	Stadium: Estadio Azteca; Attendance: 26,382; Referee: Oscar Mejia Garcia

28 January 2023 4	América	6–0	Mazatlán	Mexico City
21:05 CT	J. Rodríguez 30'; Valdés 32'; Martín 34' 59' 90+3'; S. Reyes (yellow card) 38'; R. Sánchez 40'; B. Rodríguez (yellow card) 83'	Report	Colula (yellow card) 21'; Almada (yellow card) 68'; Meraz (red card) 81'	Stadium: Estadio Azteca; Attendance: 22,588; Referee: Luis Enrique Santander

4 February 2023 5	Santos Laguna	2–2	América	Torreón
21:05 CT	Brunetta (yellow card) 10'; Preciado 23'; Correa 40' (yellow card) 89'; González (red card) 90'	Report	Martín 45+8' (pen.) (yellow card) 45+10'; Martínez 84' (yellow card) 85'	Stadium: Estadio Corona; Attendance: 25,746; Referee: Diego Montaño Robles

11 February 2023 6	América	2–1	Necaxa	Mexico City
17:00 CT	Valdés 21' (yellow card) 69'; Martín 50' (pen.); I. Reyes (yellow card) 83'; Jiménez (yellow card) 89'	Report	Méndez (yellow card) 32'; Lillini (yellow card) 32'; Peña (yellow card) 47'; Poggi (yellow card) 58'; Jurado (yellow card) 61'; Silvera 78'; Oliveros (yellow card) 82'	Stadium: Estadio Azteca; Attendance: 40,125; Referee: Ismael Rosario Lopez Peñuelas

14 February 2023 7	Atlético San Luis	1–3	América	San Luís Potosí
21:05 CT	Murillo (yellow card) 10'; Bonatini 34'	Report	Martín 10' 61'; Valdés 45+5'; Jiménez (yellow card) 60'; J. Rodríguez (yellow card) 73'	Stadium: Estadio Alfonso Lastras; Attendance: 22,240; Referee: Fernando Hernandez Gomez

19 February 2023 8	América	2–1	Tijuana	Mexico City
19:05 CT	Suárez 32'; Valdés 52'; S. Reyes (yellow card) 55'; Sánchez (yellow card) 75'; Jiménez (yellow card) 90+5'	Report	Domínguez (red card) 69'; Martínez 81'; Govea (yellow card) 90+1'	Stadium: Estadio Azteca; Attendance: 31,012; Referee: Fernando Guerrero Ramírez

25 February 2023 9	Atlas	2–2	América	Jalisco
21:05 CT	Herrera (yellow card) 33'; Lozano 45+2' 68'; Márquez (yellow card) 79'; Abella (yellow card) 90+7'	Report	J. Rodríguez 31'; Martín 39'	Stadium: Estadio Jalisco; Attendance: 29,814; Referee: Luis Enrique Santander

4 March 2023 10	América	0–3	Pachuca	Mexico City
19:05 CT	S. Reyes (yellow card) 42'	Report	López 4'; Hernández 10'; de la Rosa 29'	Stadium: Estadio Azteca; Attendance: 46,273; Referee: Adonai Escobedo González

11 March 2023 11	Tigres UANL	0–2	América	Nuevo León
21:10 CT	Pizarro (yellow card) 66'; Ibañez (yellow card) 90+5'	Report	J. Rodríguez 32' (yellow card) 43'; Fidalgo (yellow card) 46'; Valdés (yellow card) 69'; Suárez 79'	Stadium: Estadio Universitario; Attendance: 41,615; Referee: Victor Alfonso Caceres Hernandez

18 March 2023 12	Guadalajara	2–4	América	Jalisco
21:00 CT	Vega (yellow card) 46'; Lara 62' (o.g.); Flores 72'; Calderón (yellow card) 90'; Guzmán (red card) 90+7'	Report	Suárez (yellow card) 4' (goal) 41'; J. Rodríguez 16' 38'; Martín 53' (yellow card) 55'; Zendejas (yellow card) 90'	Stadium: Estadio Akron; Attendance: 38,834; Referee: Marco Antonio Ortiz Nava

1 April 2023 13	América	2–2	León	Mexico City
19:05 CT	Valdés 63' (yellow card) 65'; Martín 68'; Ortiz (red card) 73'	Report	Alvarado 45+2'; Barreiro (yellow card) 65'; Cota (yellow card) 69'; Moreno (yellow card) 72'; Larcamón (red card) 73'; Campbell 90+4'	Stadium: Estadio Azteca; Attendance: 37,384; Referee: Fernando Hernandez Gomez

8 April 2023 14	América	2–1	Monterrey	Mexico City
21:10 CT	J. Rodríguez (yellow card) 34'; Valdés 36'; Viñas (yellow card) 65' (goal) 79'; Cáceres (yellow card) 87'	Report	Meza 19'; Moreno (yellow card) 27'; Ortiz (yellow card) 34'; Andrada (red card) 90+7'	Stadium: Estadio Azteca; Attendance: 49,974; Referee: Victor Alfonso Caceres Hernandez

15 April 2023 15	Cruz Azul	1–3	América	Mexico City
21:10 CT	Antuna 12' (yellow card) 55'; Estrada (red card) 45+2'; Lira (yellow card) 48'	Report	Zendejas 42' 47'; Fuentes (yellow card) 53'; Martín 63'	Stadium: Estadio Azteca; Attendance: 66,364; Referee: Fernando Guerrero Ramírez

22 April 2023 16	América	1–1	UNAM	Mexico City
21:10 CT	Layún (yellow card) 66'; Martín 72' (pen.); Araujo (yellow card) 90+5'	Report	Caicedo (yellow card) 6'; Mohamed (yellow card) 10' (yellow-red card) 42'; Del Prete (yellow card) 50'; Freire 68'; Monroy (yellow card) 70'; González (yellow card) 84'; Kenny (red card) 90+5'	Stadium: Estadio Azteca; Attendance: 60,332; Referee: César Arturo Ramos Palazuelos

28 April 2023 17	Juárez	0–1	América	Ciudad Juárez
21:05 CT	Olivera (yellow card) 64'; Salcedo (yellow card) 74'; Rodríguez (yellow card) 84'	Report	Cáceres (yellow card) 37'; R. Sánchez 36'; Aquino (yellow card) 60'	Stadium: Estadio Olímpico Benito Juárez; Attendance: 19,314; Referee: Daniel Quintero Huitrón

=== Goalscorers ===
==== Regular phase ====
Position	Nation	Name	Goals scored
1.	(Mexico)	Henry Martín	14
2.	(Chile)	Diego Valdés	6
3.	(Uruguay)	Jonathan Rodríguez	5
4.	(United States)	Alejandro Zendejas	3
5.	(Paraguay)	Richard Sánchez	2
5.	(Argentina)	Leonardo Suárez	2
6.	(Colombia)	Roger Martínez	1
6.	(Uruguay)	Brian Rodríguez	1
6.	(Uruguay)	Federico Viñas	1
Total			36

=== Liguilla ===
==== Quarter-finals ====
10 May 2023 First leg	Atlético San Luis	1–3	América	San Luis Potosí
21:10 CT	Bonatini 24'; Güémez (yellow card) 31'; Sanabria (yellow card) 65'	Report	J. Rodríguez 9' (yellow card) 45+4'; Valdés 19'; Suárez 34'; I. Reyes (red card) 83'; Viñas (yellow card) 89'	Stadium: Estadio Alfonso Lastras; Attendance: 21,823; Referee: Fernando Guerrero Ramírez

13 May 2023 Second leg	América	1–2 (4–3 agg.)	Atlético San Luis	Mexico City
21:16 CT	Valdés (yellow card) 58'; R. Sánchez (yellow card) 81'; Zendejas (yellow card) 81'; B. Rodríguez 88'; Aquino (yellow card) 90+4'	Report	Bilbao 18'; Bonatini 31'; Villalpando (yellow card) 51'; Murillo (yellow card) 85'	Stadium: Estadio Azteca; Attendance: 47,686; Referee: Daniel Quintero Huitron

==== Semi-finals ====
18 May 2023 First leg	Guadalajara	0–1	América	Jalisco
20:10 CT	Orozco (yellow card) 52'; Beltrán (yellow card) 61'; J. Sánchez (yellow card) 89'	Report	I. Reyes (yellow card) 57'; Zendejas 60'	Stadium: Estadio Akron; Attendance: 42,195; Referee: César Arturo Ramos Palazuelos

21 May 2023 Second leg	América	1–3 (2–3 agg.)	Guadalajara	Mexico City
20:10 CT	I. Reyes (yellow card) 39'; Zendejas (yellow card) 40'; Valdés 57'; Fidalgo (red card) 64'; Malagón (yellow card) 72'; Martínez (yellow card) 90+8'	Report	Briseño (yellow card) 3'; Cisneros 19'; González (yellow card) 21'; Sepúlveda (yellow card) 26'; Mozo 76'; Orozco 88'; Beltrán (yellow card) 90+3'	Stadium: Estadio Azteca; Attendance: 67,501; Referee: Victor Alfonso Caceres Hernandez

=== Goalscorers ===
==== Final phase ====
Position	Nation	Name	Goals scored
1.	(Chile)	Diego Valdés	2
2.	(Uruguay)	Brian Rodríguez	1
2.	(Uruguay)	Jonathan Rodríguez	1
2.	(Argentina)	Leonardo Suárez	1
2.	(United States)	Alejandro Zendejas	1
Total			6
