= Jonathan dos Santos =

Mexican footballer (born 1990)

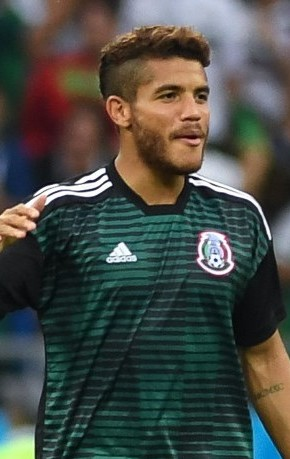
- Dos Santos with Mexico at the 2018 FIFA World Cup

Personal information
- Full name: Jonathan dos Santos Ramírez
- Date of birth: 26 April 1990 (age 36)
- Place of birth: Mexico City, Mexico
- Height: 1.73 m (5 ft 8 in)
- Position: Defensive midfielder

Youth career
- 2002–2009: Barcelona

Senior career*
Years	Team	Apps	(Gls)
2009–2012	Barcelona B	81	(6)
2009–2014	Barcelona	14	(0)
2014–2017	Villarreal	88	(4)
2017–2021	LA Galaxy	104	(6)
2022–2026	América	113	(1)

International career^{‡}
2009–2021	Mexico	57	(5)
Medal record
Representing Mexico
Men's football
CONCACAF Gold Cup
Winner	2015 United States-Canada
Winner	2019 United States
Runner-up	2021 United States
- * Club domestic league appearances and goals as of 1 March 2025 ‡ National team caps and goals as of 8 September 2021

Jonathan dos Santos Ramírez (Spanish pronunciation: [ˈɟʝonatan dos ˈsantos]; Brazilian Portuguese: [ˈʒonatɐ̃ dus ˈsɐ̃tus]; born 26 April 1990) is a Mexican former professional footballer who played as a defensive midfielder.

== Early life ==
Born in Mexico City, Jonathan was competing along with his brother Giovani in a youth tournament in France, where he was spotted by Barcelona scouts, who decided to bring him and his brother to La Masia for a trial.

== Club career ==
=== Barcelona ===
==== 2008–09 season ====
In the 2008–09 season, Dos Santos was in Juvenil A where he was captain of the team. During that same season, he obtained a Spanish passport and thereby acquired Citizenship of the European Union, which enabled him to play in the first team.

==== 2009–10 season ====
In the summer of 2009, Dos Santos was selected by Barcelona B manager Luis Enrique to form part of the second team. Subsequently, Pep Guardiola called him up to the first team during pre-season in England and the tour in the United States. On 15 August 2009, Dos Santos was called up for his first official game with the first team in the Supercopa de España against Athletic Bilbao, although he was eventually ruled out and saw the game as a spectator. He made his debut with Barcelona B on 5 September 2009 against Mallorca B. The match finished in a 1–1 draw. Dos Santos made his debut for Barcelona on 28 October 2009, coming on as a substitute for Seydou Keita in the 80th minute in an away Copa del Rey match against Cultural Leonesa, which Barcelona won 2–0. He made his Champions League debut for Barcelona on 24 November 2009 against Internazionale in a 2–0 win at the Camp Nou when he replaced Andrés Iniesta in the 92nd minute. Due to the lengthy 2009–10 season, many Barcelona first-team players were given breaks towards the end of the year. This meant the first team was going to be a few men short, and hence four Barça B players were called up by Guardiola on 29 December 2009. Among these four were Dos Santos, Thiago, Gai Assulin and Víctor Vázquez. His La Liga debut came on 2 January 2010 when he started against Villarreal, before being substituted by Iniesta in the 60th minute.

==== 2010–11 season ====
Dos Santos was called up by Pep Guardiola to the Barcelona first team during pre-season along with other players from Barcelona B. In the first three matches, Guardiola played him as defensive midfielder, a position he had never played before. Nevertheless, Dos Santos said: "I've felt comfortable in this position."

==== 2011–12 season ====
On 26 July 2011, Dos Santos started, and scored a goal, in the 2–2 draw against Internacional in the 2011 Audi Cup. The match went to a penalty shootout, where he scored as well. Barcelona advanced to the final, where they beat Bayern Munich 2–0. He was part of the starting line-up in both matches, though he played at right back in the final. He made his season debut on 29 August in the 5–0 home win against Villarreal, coming in as a substitute for Cesc Fàbregas in the 70th minute.

On 24 November 2011, Dos Santos signed a contract extension which would keep him at Barcelona until 2015. On 6 December, he appeared in the starting squad and played 58 minutes against BATE for the 2011–12 UEFA Champions League group stage match.

==== 2012–13 season ====
Despite rumours of a transfer to other Spanish clubs such as Real Betis and Málaga, and Sevilla, newly appointed coach Tito Vilanova officially called up Dos Santos to Barcelona's first team squad, handing him the number 12 shirt. On 6 April 2013, against Mallorca, he came on as a substitute for Andrés Iniesta in the 50th minute and competed against his brother Giovani dos Santos.

==== 2013–14 season ====
On 28 August, Dos Santos won the 2013 Supercopa de España with Barça at the Camp Nou.

==== 2014–15 season ====
Dos Santos left Barcelona at the beginning of the 2014–15 season.

=== Villarreal ===
On 9 July 2014, Dos Santos signed a five-year deal with Villarreal, and going to play with his brother Giovani. On 21 December, Dos Santos scored his first La Liga goal in a 3–0 victory against Deportivo La Coruña.

=== Los Angeles Galaxy ===
On 27 July 2017, MLS club LA Galaxy announced the signing of Dos Santos as a Designated Player, reuniting him with his brother, Giovani, at the American club. Villarreal sold Jonathan for a fee reportedly around €5–6 million. On 29 November 2021, the club parted ways with Dos Santos after his contract expired.

=== América ===
On 23 December 2021, Dos Santos joined América on a free transfer. Over the next five years, he established himself as a pivotal figure in the squad, helping them secure three league championships. Dos Santos bid farewell to the club when his contract concluded in June 2026.

== International career ==
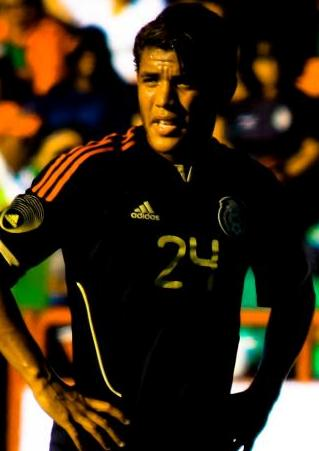
Dos Santos playing for Mexico in 2011

Dos Santos made his senior national team debut in a friendly against Colombia on 30 September 2009. He was substituted for Patricio Araujo in the 72nd minute; Colombia won the game 2–1. This meant that he represented his national team before debuting for his club team.

On 3 March 2010, Dos Santos played 61 minutes against New Zealand. During the match, off a corner from Cuauhtémoc Blanco, the ball rolled towards him and he shot from outside the box but hit the crossbar. Dos Santos was left out of Mexico's 23-man final squad for the 2010 FIFA World Cup.

In May 2011, Dos Santos was left out of the 2011 Gold Cup final squad. On 24 May 2011, he was called up to play the Copa América. He was subsequently dismissed from the team due to indiscipline.

On 29 February 2012, Dos Santos returned to the Mexico national team for a friendly against Colombia in Miami, Florida, in which they lost 2–0.

In November 2014, after a two-year absence with the national team, Dos Santos was called up by coach Miguel Herrera for the friendly matches against the Netherlands and Belarus on 12 and 18 November, respectively.

In 2015, Dos Santos was called up to Mexico's friendly against Ecuador and Paraguay. Jonathan did not start nor play in Ecuador's friendly, but he started in Paraguay's friendly which led to a 1–0 win against them at Arrowhead Stadium in Kansas City, Missouri. He was called back up for two friendlies against Costa Rica and Honduras where both matches were drawn, and he was also called up for the 2015 Gold Cup, starting in every match as Mexico won the tournament.

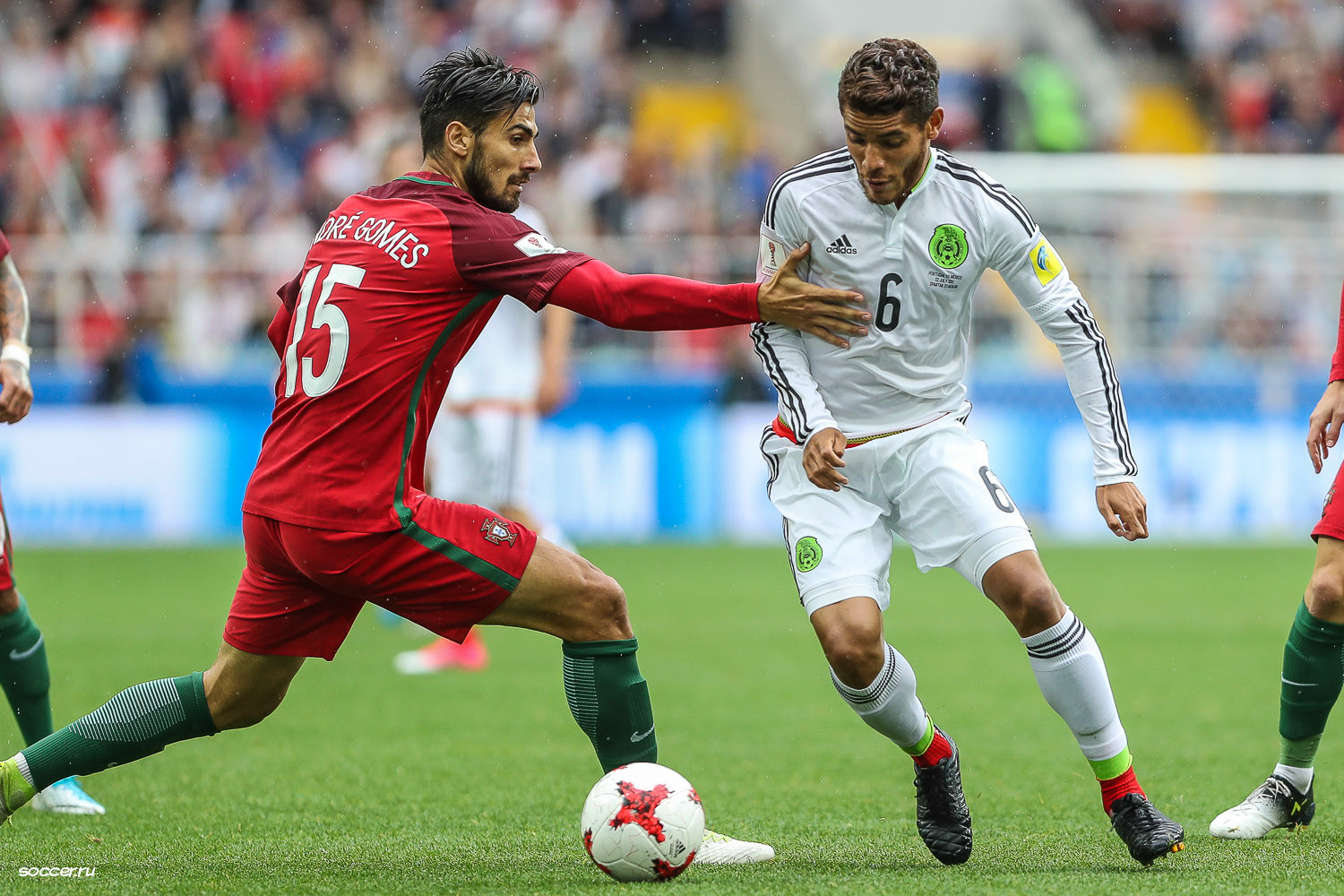
Dos Santos playing against Portugal in the 2017 Confederations Cup

In June 2018, Dos Santos was named in Mexico's 23-man squad for the World Cup in Russia.

On 26 March 2019, Dos Santos scored his first ever senior international goal, opening the scoring in a 4–2 friendly win over Paraguay. In June 2019, he was named in Mexico's 23-man squad for the 2019 Gold Cup. He scored the lone goal in a 1–0 victory over the United States in the final. He was subsequently listed in the tournament's Best XI.

On 7 July 2019, Dos Santos scored an impressive volley in the 73rd minute that ended up being the winning goal for Mexico against the United States in the 2019 CONCACAF Gold Cup final.

== Style of play ==
Dos Santos is described as a versatile midfielder, with LA Galaxy he often played as a holding midfielder. He is known for his work rate, technical acuity, defensive tenacity, vision and ability to create space and opportunities for teammates.

== Personal life ==
Jonathan is the son of former Afro-Brazilian footballer Zizinho, who played for the Mexican football clubs América and León in the late 1980s. His mother, Liliana Ramírez, is a Mexican national; two brothers and two half-brothers – the elder, Éder dos Santos, who used to play for América as a defensive midfielder before retiring, and Giovani dos Santos, is a former professional footballer.

== Career statistics ==
=== Club ===
As of 26 May 2024

Appearances and goals by club, season and competition
Club	Season	League			National cup		Continental		Other		Total	
Club	Season	Division	Apps	Goals	Apps	Goals	Apps	Goals	Apps	Goals	Apps	Goals
Barcelona B	2009–10	Segunda División B	19	1	–		–		–		19	1
Barcelona B	2010–11	Segunda División	32	2	–		–		–		32	2
Barcelona B	2011–12	Segunda División	30	3	–		–		–		30	3
Barcelona B	Total		81	6	–		–		–		81	6
Barcelona	2009–10	La Liga	3	0	2	0	1 (Note: Appearances in UEFA Champions League)	0	–		6	0
Barcelona	2010–11	La Liga	2	0	1	0	1	0	1 (Note: Appearance in Supercopa de España)	0	5	0
Barcelona	2011–12	La Liga	3	0	3	0	2	0	–		8	0
Barcelona	2012–13	La Liga	3	0	3	0	–		–		6	0
Barcelona	2013–14	La Liga	3	0	–		–		–		3	0
Barcelona	2014–15	La Liga	0	0	–		–		–		0	0
Barcelona	Total		14	0	9	0	4	0	1	0	28	0
Villarreal	2014–15	La Liga	28	2	5	1	9 (Note: Appearances in UEFA Europa League)	0	—		42	3
Villarreal	2015–16	La Liga	26	0	2	0	10	1	—		35	1
Villarreal	2016–17	La Liga	34	2	4	0	8	1	—		48	3
Villarreal	Total		88	4	11	1	27	2	—		126	7
LA Galaxy	2017	MLS	12	1	—		—		—		12	1
LA Galaxy	2018	MLS	23	2	—		—		—		23	2
LA Galaxy	2019	MLS	29	2	—		—		2 (Note: Appearances in MLS Cup Playoffs)	1	31	3
LA Galaxy	2020	MLS	13	0	—		—		—		13	0
LA Galaxy	2021	MLS	26	1	—		—		—		26	1
LA Galaxy	Total		103	6	—		—		2	1	105	7
América	2021–22	Liga MX	11	0	—		—		—		11	0
América	2022–23	Liga MX	26	1	—		—		—		26	1
América	2023–24	Liga MX	43	0	—		6 (Note: Appearances in CONCACAF Champions Cup)	0	4 (Note: Appearances in Leagues Cup)	0	53	0
América	2024–25	Liga MX	21	0	—		—		—		21	0
América	Total		101	1	—		6	0	4	0	90	1
Career total			366	17	20	1	37	2	7	1	430	21

=== International ===
As of 8 September 2021

Appearances and goals by national team and year
National team	Year	Apps	Goals
Mexico	2009	1	0
Mexico	2010	4	0
Mexico	2012	1	0
Mexico	2014	2	0
Mexico	2015	10	0
Mexico	2016	1	0
Mexico	2017	13	0
Mexico	2018	6	0
Mexico	2019	7 (Note: Jonathan dos Santos additionally played a match against Martinique in 2019, which is not recognized by FIFA.)	3
Mexico	2020	2	0
Mexico	2021	10	2
Total		57	5

Scores and results list Mexico's goal tally first, score column indicates score after each dos Santos goal.

List of international goals scored by Jonathan dos Santos
No.	Date	Venue	Opponent	Score	Result	Competition
1	26 March 2019	Levi's Stadium, Santa Clara, United States	Paraguay	1–0	4–2	Friendly
2	9 June 2019	AT&T Stadium, Arlington, United States	Ecuador	1–0	3–2	Friendly
3	7 July 2019	Soldier Field, Chicago, United States	United States	1–0	1–0	2019 CONCACAF Gold Cup Final
4	3 July 2021	Los Angeles Memorial Coliseum, Los Angeles, United States	Nigeria	4–0	4–0	Friendly
5	24 July 2021	State Farm Stadium, Glendale, United States	Honduras	2–0	3–0	2021 CONCACAF Gold Cup

== Honours ==
Barcelona

- La Liga: 2009–10, 2010–11, 2012–13
- Copa del Rey: 2011–12, 2014–15
- Supercopa de España: 2009, 2010, 2011, 2013
- UEFA Champions League: 2010–11
- UEFA Super Cup: 2009, 2011
- FIFA Club World Cup: 2009, 2011

América

- Liga MX: Apertura 2023, Clausura 2024, Apertura 2024
- Campeón de Campeones: 2024
- Supercopa de la Liga MX: 2024
- Campeones Cup: 2024

Mexico

- CONCACAF Gold Cup: 2015, 2019
- CONCACAF Cup: 2015

Individual

- MLS All-Star: 2018, 2019
- CONCACAF Gold Cup Best XI: 2019
- Liga MX Best XI: Clausura 2024
- Liga MX Best Defensive Midfielder: 2023–24
- Liga MX All-Star: 2024
