= Miguel Layún =

Mexican footballer (born 1988)

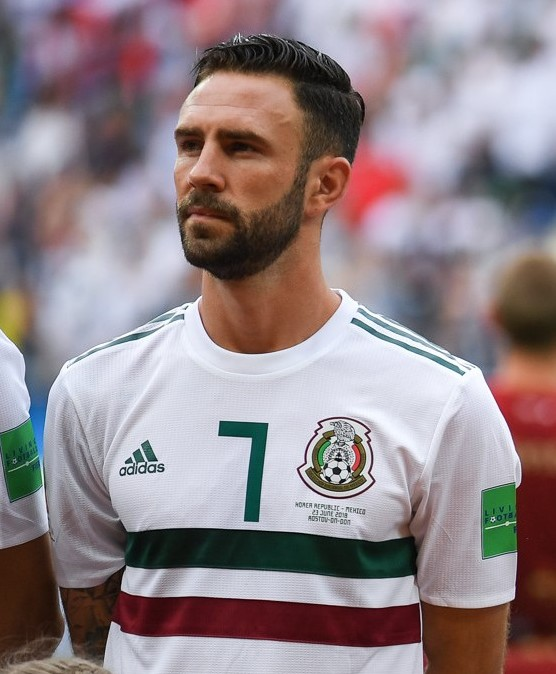
- Layún with Mexico in 2018

Personal information
- Full name: Miguel Arturo Layún Prado
- Date of birth: 25 June 1988 (age 38)
- Place of birth: Córdoba, Veracruz, Mexico
- Height: 1.76 m (5 ft 9 in)
- Position: Right-back

Youth career
- 2003–2006: Querétaro

Senior career*
| Years | Team | Apps | (Gls) |
| 2006 | Gallos Caliente Tijuana | 3 | (0) |
| 2007–2009 | Veracruz | 58 | (1) |
| 2009–2010 | Atalanta | 2 | (0) |
| 2010–2014 | América | 142 | (15) |
| 2014–2015 | Watford | 20 | (1) |
| 2015–2018 | Porto | 50 | (6) |
| 2018 | → Sevilla (loan) | 16 | (2) |
| 2018–2019 | Villarreal | 8 | (0) |
| 2019–2021 | Monterrey | 73 | (3) |
| 2021–2023 | América | 68 | (1) |
| Total | | 440 | (29) |

International career
| 2013–2020 | Mexico | 71 | (6) |
Medal record
Representing Mexico
| Winner | CONCACAF Gold Cup | 2015 |
- * Club domestic league appearances and goals

Miguel Arturo Layún Prado (born 25 June 1988) is a Mexican former professional footballer who played as a right-back.

Over the course of his 17-year career, Layún represented nine clubs across five countries. He is best remembered for his time at Club América, where he won three league titles. During his stint in Europe, he became the first Mexican footballer to play in Serie A. Later, he captured a Primeira Liga championship with Porto, and upon returning to Mexico, he added another league title with Monterrey.

An international since 2013, Layún represented Mexico at the 2014 and 2018 FIFA World Cups, the 2017 FIFA Confederations Cup, and two CONCACAF Gold Cups, winning the 2015 edition.

== Club career ==
=== Gallos Caliente Tijuana ===
In 2006, Miguel Layún began his professional career with Gallos Caliente Tijuana, which was Querétaro reserve team in Primera "A". He debuted on a match against Monarcas Morelia Primera "A" on 5 October 2006.

=== Veracruz ===
After being transferred to C.D. Veracruz in his home state, Layún debuted in the Primera División during the Clausura 2007 tournament on 28 April against Necaxa. The match ended in a 1–1 draw.

He went on to stay with the club until 2009, with Veracruz ultimately being relegated to the second division. Layún managed to score his only goal with Veracruz in a 5–1 victory against Tampico Madero on 25 February 2009, scoring the fifth and final goal.

=== Atalanta ===
After his time with Veracruz, Layún had a successful trial with Italian club Atalanta, transferring for €625,000. The move made Layún the first Mexican to play in the Serie A.

He made his league debut on 27 September 2009 in a 1–1 draw against Chievo at the Stadio Marc'Antonio Bentegodi in Verona, coming on as a substitute in the 82nd minute of the match for Jaime Valdés, thus becoming the first Mexican to play an official match in Serie A. He made a second league appearance with the team against Cagliari on 1 November, again coming on as a substitute, replacing Nicola Madonna in the 66th minute of the match, which ended in a 3–0 defeat. Layún only managed two league appearances during the season.

=== América ===
On 21 December 2009, Layún was officially transferred to Club América for the Clausura 2010 tournament, becoming the club's second signing of the winter transfer window.

Layún scored his first goal for América on 2 May 2010 during the first-leg of the quarter-final match against Toluca, which ended in a 2–2 at the Estadio Azteca.

On 26 May 2013, Layún scored the final penalty in the shoot-out against Cruz Azul in the Clausura 2013 Final, winning the first league championship in his career. He came on as a substitute, replacing Diego Reyes in the first half of the match.

Prior to the Apertura 2014, Layún was named one of four players that would captain the club throughout the tournament. He captained the team for the first time on 2 August in a league match against Puebla, with América winning the match 4–0. On 26 September, Layún scored four goals in the 4–1 victory over Santos Laguna.

On 14 December 2014, Layún captained América to the league title following a 3–1 aggregate victory over Tigres UANL in the finals.

=== Watford ===
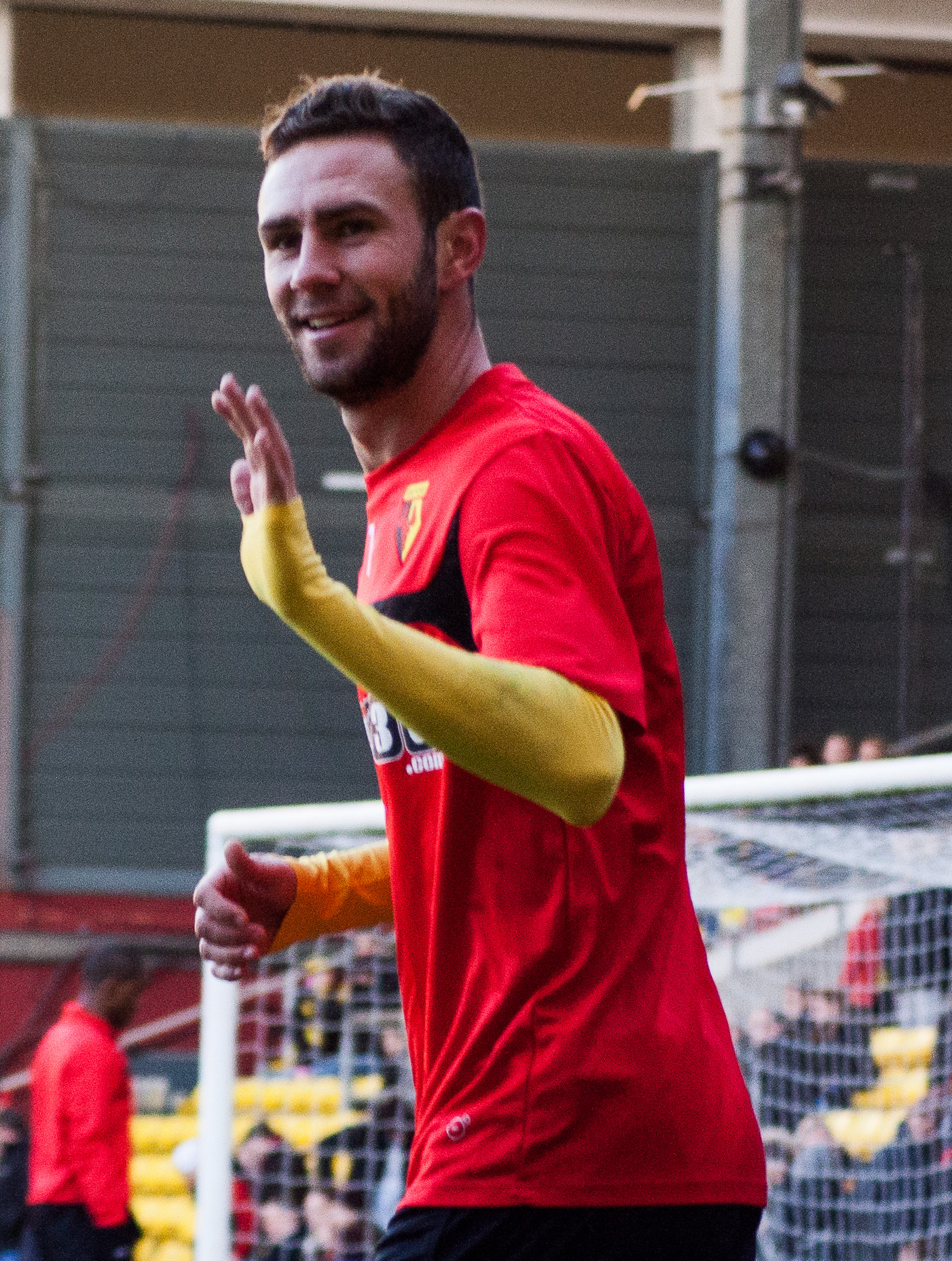
Layún with Watford (2015)

On 30 December 2014, it was announced that Layún had transferred to La Liga club Granada on a five-year deal; however, he was expected to go on loan for the remainder of the season to English Championship club Watford. On 9 January 2015, it was announced that Layún had signed a permanent four-and-a-half-year deal with Watford, being handed the number 7 shirt. He made his Championship debut the following day in the 1–3 defeat to Huddersfield Town, playing all ninety minutes.

In his first season with the club, Layún played in 17 games, with Watford gaining promotion to the Premier League. On 8 August, Layún scored on his Premier League debut in a 2–2 draw against Everton at Goodison Park.

=== Porto ===
On 31 August 2015, it was announced that Layún would join Porto on a year-long loan deal with an option to buy for €6 million. On 12 September 2015, Layún made his official debut in a 3–1 win against FC Arouca, playing all 90 minutes. On 4 November, he scored his first goal for Porto in the team's 3–1 win over Maccabi Tel Aviv in the Champions League. Four days later, Layún scored his first league goal in Porto's 2–0 win over Vitória Setúbal.

On 28 May 2016, it was announced that Porto had signed Layún on a permanent deal, with the reported €6 million fee to be paid in two installments.

==== Sevilla (loan) ====
On 30 January 2018, Layún joined Spanish La Liga outfit Sevilla on a loan deal that ran for the remainder of the 2017–18 season and included a buyout option.

=== Villarreal ===
On 11 July 2018, Layún joined Villarreal on a three-year deal. On 31 August 2018, he would make his debut with the team coming in as a substitute for Santi Cazorla at the 75th minute against Girona, where Villarreal lost 1–0.

=== Monterrey ===
In January 2019, he moved to Monterrey. Despite interest from European clubs like Celta de Vigo and Milan for his services during the 2018 winter transfer season, Layun decided that financially and personally it was a better decision to be back in Mexico and still play at a high level. On 2 June 2021, Layún and Monterrey parted ways by mutual consent.

=== Return to América and retirement ===
On 3 June 2021, Layún returned to Club América signing a one-year deal, with the option of an additional year. On 8 October 2023, he announced he would retire from professional football at the end of the year. Layún played his last match as a professional in the Apertura 2023 league's final, winning the match versus Tigres UANL and retiring as a Liga MX champion for Club America.

== International career ==
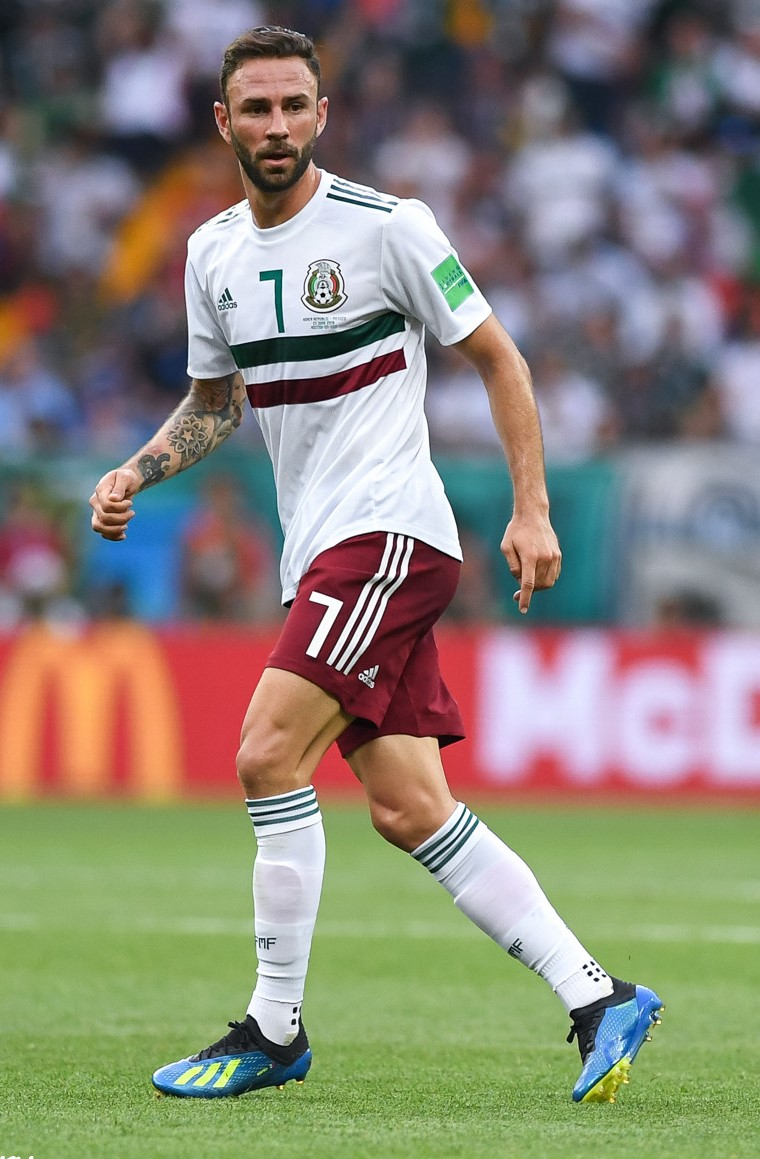
Layún playing for Mexico in 2018

In 2013, Layún received his first national team call up by coach José Manuel de la Torre after his performances with Club América during the Clausura tournament. He was selected for the 2013 CONCACAF Gold Cup held in the United States, with the entire squad being made up of players from the Mexican league. He made his debut on 11 July in the group stage match against Canada at CenturyLink Field in Seattle. He played the entire ninety minutes in Mexico's 2–0 victory. Mexico was eventually eliminated from the competition by Panama in the semi-finals.

Layún was called up again by interim coach Víctor Manuel Vucetich to participate in Mexico's last two World Cup qualifying matches against Panama and Costa Rica. Layún would play in both matches. Mexico nearly missed out on qualifying to the World Cup after Mexico's 2–1 loss to Costa Rica, however Mexico made it to the Intercontinental playoff against New Zealand. Layún again was called up by Mexico's new coach Miguel Herrera – his coach at Club América at the time – to play in the first leg, providing two assists for Oribe Peralta in the 5–1 victory at the Estadio Azteca. Mexico would qualify to the 2014 World Cup by defeating New Zealand by an aggregate score of 9–3.

On 8 May, Layún was included in Mexico's 23-man squad for the 2014 World Cup. He made his World Cup debut on 13 June against Cameroon, playing as a left back. Mexico won the match 1–0. Layún started in all three group matches as Mexico advanced to the round-of-16, where Mexico was subsequently eliminated by The Netherlands.

In May 2018, Layún was named in Mexico's squad for the World Cup in Russia. He appeared in all four of Mexico's matches at the tournament.

== Style of play ==
A fast player capable of attacking and defending, he can play as a left-back or right-back with the same effectiveness. Bleacher Report described him as "very fast, skillful and posses a fantastic stride. The [former] America player can leave behind midfielders and defenders in the blink of an eye. [...] His abilities set him as the kind of player that provides depth through the sidelines but who can also take part in set pieces."

Andrés Corona Zurita of Univision described him as, "[having] a crazy game style, powerful, fast, then slow and explosive again. Able to place a center on the forehead of the forward [.] He takes free throws, corners, penalties and hits well from afar."

== Personal life ==
Miguel Layún is of Lebanese descent, due to his paternal grandfather Yousseff Layún who immigrated to Veracruz, and of Spanish descent, due to his maternal grandfather Guillermo Prado being born in Spain, and as a result holds a Spanish passport. After making his debut for the national team in 2013, he became the second Lebanese-Mexican player after Miguel Sabah to play for the Mexico national team. By far, he is the most successful Lebanese Mexican footballer in Mexico, and he is also popular in Lebanon, where people would cheer for him and the Mexican side.

Layún and fellow footballer José Abella are second cousins, as their grandmothers are sisters. They both grew up playing at local club, Casino Español de Córdoba. Layún's sister, Mariana, participated in the 2010 International Ballet Competition in which she won a bronze medal.

== Career statistics ==
=== Club ===
Appearances and goals by club, season and competition
| Club | Season | League | | | National cup | | Continental | | Total | |
| Club | Season | Division | Apps | Goals | Apps | Goals | Apps | Goals | Apps | Goals |
|---|---|---|---|---|---|---|---|---|---|---|
| Veracruz | 2006–07 | Primera División | 1 | 0 | — | | — | | 1 | 0 |
| Veracruz | 2007–08 | Primera División | 30 | 0 | — | | — | | 30 | 0 |
| Veracruz | 2008–09 | Liga de Ascenso | 27 | 1 | — | | — | | 27 | 1 |
| Veracruz | Total | | 58 | 1 | — | | — | | 58 | 1 |
| Atalanta | 2009–10 | Serie A | 2 | 0 | — | | — | | 2 | 0 |
| América | 2009–10 | Primera División | 10 | 1 | 1 | 0 | — | | 11 | 1 |
| América | 2010–11 | Primera División | 38 | 1 | — | | 5 | 0 | 43 | 1 |
| América | 2011–12 | Primera División | 11 | 0 | — | | — | | 11 | 0 |
| América | 2012–13 | Liga MX | 33 | 2 | 11 | 3 | — | | 44 | 5 |
| América | 2013–14 | Liga MX | 33 | 5 | — | | 3 | 0 | 36 | 5 |
| América | 2014–15 | Liga MX | 17 | 6 | — | | — | | 17 | 6 |
| América | Total | | 142 | 15 | 12 | 3 | 8 | 0 | 162 | 18 |
| Watford | 2014–15 | Championship | 17 | 0 | — | | — | | 17 | 0 |
| Watford | 2015–16 | Premier League | 3 | 1 | 1 | 0 | — | | 4 | 1 |
| Watford | Total | | 20 | 1 | 1 | 0 | — | | 21 | 1 |
| Porto | 2015–16 | Primeira Liga | 27 | 5 | 6 | 0 | 8 | 1 | 41 | 6 |
| Porto | 2016–17 | Primeira Liga | 16 | 1 | 1 | 0 | 8 | 2 | 25 | 3 |
| Porto | 2017–18 | Primeira Liga | 7 | 0 | 5 | 1 | 2 | 1 | 14 | 2 |
| Porto | Total | | 50 | 6 | 12 | 1 | 18 | 4 | 80 | 11 |
| Sevilla (loan) | 2017–18 | La Liga | 16 | 2 | 2 | 0 | — | | 18 | 2 |
| Villarreal | 2018–19 | La Liga | 8 | 0 | 4 | 0 | 3 | 0 | 15 | 0 |
| Monterrey | 2018–19 | Liga MX | 11 | 0 | — | | 8 | 1 | 19 | 1 |
| Monterrey | 2019–20 | Liga MX | 30 | 3 | 3 | 2 | 3 | 0 | 36 | 5 |
| Monterrey | 2020–21 | Liga MX | 32 | 0 | — | | 2 | 1 | 34 | 1 |
| Monterrey | Total | | 73 | 3 | 3 | 2 | 13 | 2 | 89 | 7 |
| América | 2021–22 | Liga MX | 27 | 0 | — | | — | | 27 | 0 |
| América | 2022–23 | Liga MX | 27 | 1 | — | | — | | 27 | 1 |
| América | 2023–24 | Liga MX | 14 | 0 | — | | 3 | 0 | 17 | 0 |
| América | Total | | 68 | 1 | — | | 3 | 0 | 71 | 1 |
| Career total | | | 437 | 29 | 34 | 6 | 45 | 6 | 516 | 41 |

=== International ===
Appearances and goals by national team and year
| National team | Year | Apps | Goals |
|---|---|---|---|
| Mexico | 2013 | 8 (Note: Miguel Layún additionally played a match against Martinique in 2013, which is not recognized by FIFA.) | 0 |
| Mexico | 2014 | 13 | 3 |
| Mexico | 2015 | 14 | 0 |
| Mexico | 2016 | 11 | 1 |
| Mexico | 2017 | 12 | 0 |
| Mexico | 2018 | 9 | 2 |
| Mexico | 2019 | 3 | 0 |
| Mexico | 2020 | 1 | 0 |
| Total | | 71 | 6 |

Scores and results list Mexico's goal tally first, score column indicates score after each Layún goal.

List of international goals scored by Miguel Layún
| No. | Date | Venue | Opponent | Score | Result | Competition |
|---|---|---|---|---|---|---|
| 1 | 28 May 2014 | Estadio Azteca, Mexico City, Mexico | Israel | 1–0 | 3–0 | Friendly |
| 2 | 28 May 2014 | Estadio Azteca, Mexico City, Mexico | Israel | 2–0 | 3–0 | Friendly |
| 3 | 9 September 2014 | Dick's Sporting Goods Park, Commerce City, United States | Bolivia | 1–0 | 1–0 | Friendly |
| 4 | 11 November 2016 | Mapfre Stadium, Columbus, United States | United States | 1–0 | 2–1 | 2018 FIFA World Cup qualification |
| 5 | 23 March 2018 | Levi's Stadium, Santa Clara, United States | Iceland | 2–0 | 3–0 | Friendly |
| 6 | 23 March 2018 | Levi's Stadium, Santa Clara, United States | Iceland | 3–0 | 3–0 | Friendly |

== Honours ==
América

- Liga MX: Clausura 2013, Apertura 2014, Apertura 2023

Watford

- EFL Championship runner-up: 2014–15

Porto

- Primeira Liga: 2017–18
- Taça de Portugal runner-up: 2015–16

Sevilla

- Copa del Rey runner-up: 2017–18

Monterrey

- Liga MX: Apertura 2019
- Copa MX: 2019–20
- CONCACAF Champions League: 2019, 2021
- FIFA Club World Cup third place: 2019

Mexico

- FIFA Confederations Cup fourth place: 2017
- CONCACAF Gold Cup: 2015
- CONCACAF Cup: 2015

Individual

- Primeira Liga Top Assists Leader: 2015–16
- CONCACAF Best XI: 2015, 2016
- CONCACAF Champions League Team of the Tournament: 2019
- Liga MX Player of the Month: October 2021
- Leagues Cup Top Scorer: 2022
- GQ Men of the Year Leadership Award: 2023

Records

- First Mexican Player to Play in the Serie A
