= Salvador Reyes (footballer, born 1998) =

Mexican footballer (born 1998)

Personal information
- Full name: Salvador Reyes Chávez
- Date of birth: 4 May 1998 (age 28)
- Place of birth: Taxco, Guerrero, Mexico
- Height: 1.72 m (5 ft 8 in)
- Positions: Left-back; left winger

Team information
- Current team: León
- Number: 26

Youth career
- 2012–2016: Morelia

Senior career*
Years	Team	Apps	(Gls)
2017–2020	Morelia	6	(0)
2019	→ Sonora (loan)	15	(3)
2020–2021	→ Puebla (loan)	45	(3)
2021–2024	América	99	(10)
2024–	León	76	(1)

International career^{‡}
2018	Mexico U21	3	(0)
2021–2023	Mexico	2	(0)
- * Club domestic league appearances and goals as of 17 October 2026 ‡ National team caps and goals as of 7 June 2023

Salvador Reyes Chávez (born 4 May 1998), commonly known as Chava, is a Mexican professional footballer who plays as a left-back or left winger for Liga MX club León.

== International career ==
In December 2021, Reyes received his first call-up to the senior national team by Gerardo Martino for a friendly match against Chile set to take place on December 8.

On 8 December 2021, Reyes made his senior debut for Mexico in a friendly match against Chile.

== Career statistics ==
=== Club ===
As of match played on 17 October 2026

Club	Season	League			Cup		Continental		Other		Total	
Club	Season	Division	Apps	Goals	Apps	Goals	Apps	Goals	Apps	Goals	Apps	4Goals
Morelia	2016–17	Liga MX	—		1	0	—		—		1	0
Morelia	2017–18	Liga MX	3	0	7	0	—		—		10	0
Morelia	2018–19	Liga MX	2	0	3	1	—		—		5	1
Morelia	2019–20	Liga MX	1	0	2	0	—		—		3	0
Morelia	Total		6	0	13	1	—		—		19	1
Sonora (loan)	2018–19	Ascenso MX	15	3	3	0	—		—		18	3
Puebla	2019–20	Liga MX	8	0	—		—		—		8	0
Puebla	2020–21	Liga MX	37	3	—		—		—		37	3
Puebla	Total		45	3	—		—		—		45	3
América	2020–21	Liga MX	—		—		3 (Note: Appearances in CONCACAF Champions Cup)	0	—		3	0
América	2021–22	Liga MX	35	5	—		—		—		35	5
América	2022–23	Liga MX	30	1	4 (Note: Appearances in Copa Sky por México)	1	—		1 (Note: Appearances in Leagues Cup)	0	35	2
América	2023–24	Liga MX	34	4	—		5	0	4	0	43	4
América	Total		99	10	4	1	8	0	5	0	116	11
León	2024–25	Liga MX	36	1	—		—		2	0	38	1
León	2025–26	Liga MX	31	0	—		—		3	0	34	0
León	2026–27	Liga MX	9	0	—		—		1	0	10	0
León	Total		76	1	—		—		6	0	82	1
Career total			241	17	20	2	8	0	11	0	280	19

=== International ===
As of match played on 7 June 2023

National team	Year	Apps	Goals
Mexico	2021	1	0
Mexico	2023	1	0
Total		2	0

== Honours ==
América

- Liga MX: Apertura 2023, Clausura 2024
- Campeón de Campeones: 2024

Individual

- Liga MX Best XI: Guardianes 2021, Apertura 2021
- Liga MX All-Star: 2021
