= Jorge Sánchez (footballer, born 1997) =

Mexican footballer

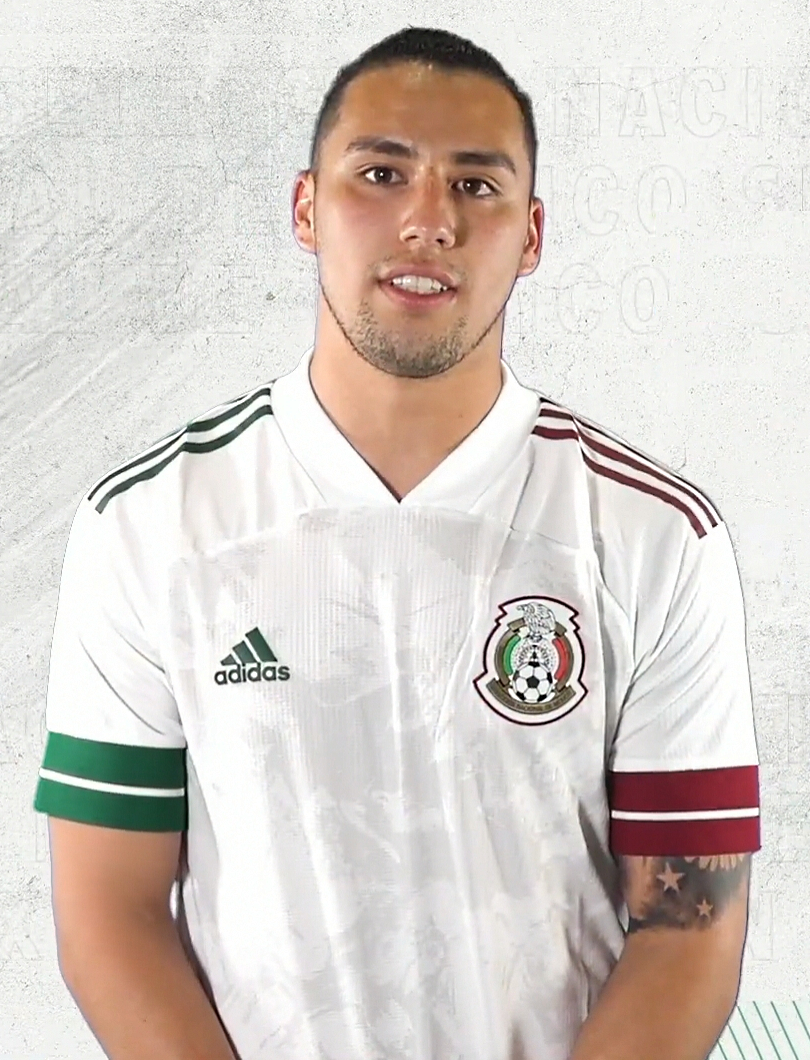
- Sánchez with Mexico in 2020

Personal information
- Full name: Jorge Eduardo Sánchez Ramos
- Date of birth: 10 December 1997 (age 28)
- Place of birth: Torreón, Coahuila, Mexico
- Height: 1.75 m (5 ft 9 in)
- Position: Right-back

Team information
- Current team: Atlas
- Number: 3

Youth career
- 2012–2016: Santos Laguna

Senior career*
Years	Team	Apps	(Gls)
2016–2018	Santos Laguna	32	(0)
2018–2022	América	125	(2)
2022–2024	Ajax	17	(2)
2023–2024	→ Porto (loan)	14	(0)
2024–2026	Cruz Azul	54	(1)
2026	PAOK	10	(0)
2026–	Atlas	12	(0)

International career^{‡}
2015	Mexico U18	3	(0)
2018	Mexico U21	6	(0)
2021	Mexico U23	5	(0)
2019–	Mexico	64	(3)
Medal record
Men's football
Representing Mexico
CONCACAF Gold Cup
Winner	2025 United States–Canada
Winner	2023 United States–Canada
Olympic Games
Bronze medal – third place	2020 Tokyo	Team
Toulon Tournament
Runner-up	2018 France	Team
- * Club domestic league appearances and goals as of 20 November 2026 ‡ National team caps and goals as of 26 September 2026

Jorge Eduardo Sánchez Ramos (born 10 December 1997) is a Mexican professional footballer who plays as a right-back for Liga MX club Atlas and the Mexico national team.

== Club career ==
=== Santos Laguna ===
Born in Torreón, Sánchez began his career with Santos Laguna, joining the team's youth academy. He made his Liga MX debut on 18 September 2016 against Pumas in a 3–1 victory, playing all 90 minutes.

=== América ===
In June 2018, Sánchez joined Club América.

=== Ajax ===
On 10 August 2022, Sánchez joined Dutch club AFC Ajax on a four-year contract, joining up with international teammate Edson Álvarez. He was handed jersey number 19. On 28 August 2022, he made his Eredivisie debut for Ajax in a 2–0 victory against FC Utrecht. On 7 September 2022, Sánchez made his UEFA Champions League debut in a 4–0 home victory against Scottish club Rangers.

==== Loan to Porto ====
On 29 August 2023, Primeira Liga side Porto announced the signing of Sánchez on a season-long loan from Ajax. The deal reportedly includes a €4 million option-to-buy, which becomes mandatory if the right-back plays at least 45 minutes in 20 matches.

Sánchez made his debut for the Dragons on 19 September, coming off the bench to replace João Mário in the 72nd minute of a 3–1 away victory over Shakhtar Donetsk, in the UEFA Champions League group stage. He made his Primeira Liga debut on 8 October, coming on as a substitute for Nico González for the five final minutes of a 1–0 victory over Portimonense at the Estádio do Dragão. On 29 October, Sánchez made his first start for Porto, playing the full 90 minutes in a 2–0 league victory away at Vizela.

=== Cruz Azul ===
On 4 July 2024, Cruz Azul reached an agreement with AFC Ajax on the transfer of Sánchez.

== International career ==
=== Youth ===
Sánchez was included in the final roster that participated at the 2018 Toulon Tournament. He appeared in four matches and was included in the Best XI of the tournament as Mexico finished runner-up. That year, Sánchez also played in the Central American and Caribbean Games, appearing in two group stage matches. Mexico finished last in their group with one point.

Sánchez was in the preliminary roster for the 2020 CONCACAF Men's Olympic Qualifying Championship but did not make the final squad.

In 2021, Sánchez was included in the under-23 squad for Summer Olympics in Japan. He won the bronze medal with the Olympic team.

=== Senior ===
Sánchez made his senior national team debut on 26 March 2019 in a friendly against Paraguay, as a starter. In May, he was included in Gerardo Martino's preliminary list for the CONCACAF Gold Cup. On 9 June, during a friendly match against Ecuador, he picked up an injury on his right leg causing him to miss the Gold Cup.

In October 2022, Sánchez was named in Mexico's preliminary 31-man squad for the 2022 FIFA World Cup, and in November, he was ultimately included in the final 26-man roster.

Sánchez was named in the 26-man squad for the 2026 FIFA World Cup, hosted on home soil.

== Career statistics ==
=== Club ===
As of match played on 20 November 2026

Appearances and goals by club, season and competition
Club	Season	League			National cup (Note: Includes Copa MX, KNVB Cup, Taça de Portugal, Greek Cup)		League cup (Note: Includes Taça da Liga)		Continental		Other		Total	
Club	Season	Division	Apps	Goals	Apps	Goals	Apps	Goals	Apps	Goals	Apps	Goals	Apps	Goals
Santos Laguna	2016–17	Liga MX	22	0	3	0	—		—		—		25	0
Santos Laguna	2017–18	Liga MX	10	0	5	0	—		—		—		15	0
Santos Laguna	Total		32	0	8	0	—		—		—		40	0
América	2018–19	Liga MX	34	1	9	0	—		—		4 (Note: Two appearances in Leagues Cup, one appearance in Campeón de Campeones, one appearance in Campeones Cup)	0	47	1
América	2019–20	Liga MX	23	0	—		—		5 (Note: Appearances in CONCACAF Champions League/Cup)	0	—		28	0
América	2020–21	Liga MX	33	1	—		—		7	0	—		40	1
América	2021–22	Liga MX	32	0	—		—		—		—		32	0
América	2022–23	Liga MX	3	0	—		—		—		—		3	0
América	Total		125	2	9	0	—		12	0	4	0	150	2
Ajax	2022–23	Eredivisie	17	2	4	1	—		5 (Note: Appearances in UEFA Champions League)	0	—		26	3
Porto (loan)	2023–24	Primeira Liga	14	0	2	0	1	0	6	0	—		23	0
Cruz Azul	2024–25	Liga MX	35	1	—		—		7	1	4 (Note: Appearances in Leagues Cup)	0	46	2
Cruz Azul	2025–26	Liga MX	19	0	—		—		0	0	2 (Note: One appearance in Leagues Cup, one appearance and one goal in FIFA Intercontinental Cup)	1	21	1
Cruz Azul	Total		54	1	—		—		7	1	6	1	67	3
PAOK	2025–26	Super League Greece	10	0	0	0	—		1 (Note: Appearance in UEFA Europa League)	0	—		11	0
Atlas	2026–27	Liga MX	12	0	—		—		—		—		12	0
Career total			264	5	23	1	1	0	31	1	10	1	329	8

=== International ===
As of match played on 26 September 2026

Appearances and goals by national team and year
National team	Year	Apps	Goals
Mexico	2019	6	0
Mexico	2020	4	0
Mexico	2021	9	1
Mexico	2022	9	0
Mexico	2023	12	0
Mexico	2024	7	1
Mexico	2025	7	0
Mexico	2026	10	1
Total		64	3

Scores and results list Mexico's goal tally first, score column indicates score after each Sánchez goal.

List of international goals scored by Jorge Sánchez
No.	Date	Venue	Opponent	Score	Result	Competition
1	7 October 2021	Estadio Azteca, Mexico City, Mexico	Canada	1–0	1–1	2022 FIFA World Cup qualification
2	19 November 2024	Estadio Nemesio Díez, Toluca, Mexico	Honduras	3–0	4–0	2024–25 CONCACAF Nations League A
3	31 March 2026	Soldier Field, Chicago, United States	Belgium	1–0	1–1	Friendly

== Honours ==
Santos Laguna

- Liga MX: Clausura 2018

América

- Liga MX: Apertura 2018
- Copa MX: Clausura 2019
- Campeón de Campeones: 2019

Porto

- Taça de Portugal: 2023–24

Cruz Azul

- Liga MX: Clausura 2026
- CONCACAF Champions Cup: 2025

PAOK

- Greek Cup runner-up: 2025–26

Mexico U23

- Olympic Bronze Medal: 2020

Mexico

- CONCACAF Gold Cup: 2023, 2025
- CONCACAF Nations League: 2024–25

Individual

- CONCACAF Best XI: 2021
- Toulon Tournament Best XI: 2018
- Liga MX All-Star: 2021
- Eredivisie Team of the Month: April 2023
- CONCACAF Gold Cup Best XI: 2023
- IFFHS Men's CONCACAF Team: 2023
- Liga MX Player of the Month: November 2024
- Liga MX Goal of the Month: November 2024
