= Santiago Baños =

Mexican footballer, coach, and chairman (born 1976)

Personal information
- Full name: Santiago Baños Reynaud
- Date of birth: 28 June 1976 (age 50)
- Place of birth: Mexico City, Mexico
- Height: 1.77 m (5 ft 10 in)
- Position: Defender

Senior career*
Years	Team	Apps	(Gls)
1995–1997	Necaxa	11	(0)
1997–1999	Cuautitlán		
2001–2002	Acapulco FC		
2002–2004	Atlante	32	(2)
2004–2007	Monterrey	16	(1)
2007	Puebla	0	(0)

Managerial career
- 2008: Veracruz (assistant)
- 2008–2010: Estudiantes Tecos (assistant)
- 2010–2011: Atlante (assistant)
- 2012–2013: América (assistant)
- 2013–2015: Mexico (assistant)
- * Club domestic league appearances and goals

Santiago Baños Reynaud (born 28 June 1976) is a Mexican former footballer, manager, and current Sporting President of Liga MX club América.
