= 2023 FIFA Club World Cup squads =

Below is a list of the 2023 FIFA Club World Cup squads. Each team had to name a 23-man squad (three of whom had to be goalkeepers). Injury replacements were allowed until 24 hours before the team's first match.

== Al Ahly ==
Manager: (Switzerland) Marcel Koller

Note: Flags indicate national team as defined under FIFA eligibility rules; some limited exceptions apply. Players may hold more than one non-FIFA nationality.

No.	Pos.	Nation	Player
1	GK	EGY	Mohamed Elshenawy
2	DF	EGY	Khaled Abdelfattah
5	FW	EGY	Ramy Rabia
6	DF	EGY	Yasser Ibrahim
7	FW	EGY	Kahraba
8	DF	EGY	Akram Tawfik
10	FW	RSA	Percy Tau
13	MF	EGY	Marwan Attia
14	MF	EGY	Hussein El Shahat
15	MF	MLI	Aliou Dieng
16	GK	EGY	Hamza Alaa
17	MF	EGY	Amr El Solia

No.	Pos.	Nation	Player
19	MF	EGY	Mohamed Magdy
21	DF	TUN	Ali Maâloul
22	MF	EGY	Emam Ashour
24	DF	EGY	Mohamed Abdelmonem
27	FW	FRA	Anthony Modeste
28	DF	EGY	Karim Fouad
29	MF	EGY	Taher Mohamed
30	DF	EGY	Mohamed Hany
31	GK	EGY	Mostafa Shobeir
33	DF	EGY	Karim El Debes
36	MF	EGY	Ahmed Koka

== Al-Ittihad ==
Manager: (Argentina) Marcelo Gallardo

Note: Flags indicate national team as defined under FIFA eligibility rules; some limited exceptions apply. Players may hold more than one non-FIFA nationality.

No.	Pos.	Nation	Player
1	GK	KSA	Abdullah Al-Mayouf
4	DF	KSA	Omar Hawsawi
6	MF	KSA	Sultan Al-Farhan
7	MF	FRA	N'Golo Kanté
8	MF	BRA	Fabinho
9	FW	FRA	Karim Benzema
10	MF	BRA	Igor Coronado
11	MF	POR	Jota
12	DF	KSA	Zakaria Hawsawi
13	DF	KSA	Muhannad Alshanqiti
15	DF	KSA	Hassan Kadesh
16	MF	KSA	Faisal Al-Ghamdi

No.	Pos.	Nation	Player
17	MF	KSA	Marwan Al-Sahafi
24	MF	KSA	Abdulrahman Alobud
25	DF	KSA	Suwailem Al-Menhali
26	DF	EGY	Ahmed Hegazy
28	DF	KSA	Ahmed Bamasud
33	DF	KSA	Madallah Alolayan
34	GK	BRA	Marcelo Grohe
77	MF	KSA	Saleh Aljaman Alamri
88	GK	KSA	Osama Al-Mermesh
90	FW	BRA	Romarinho
99	FW	MAR	Abderrazak Hamdallah

== Auckland City ==
Manager: (New Zealand) Albert Riera

Note: Flags indicate national team as defined under FIFA eligibility rules; some limited exceptions apply. Players may hold more than one non-FIFA nationality.

No.	Pos.	Nation	Player
1	GK	NZL	Conor Tracey
2	DF	NZL	Mario Ilich
3	DF	NZL	Adam Mitchell
4	DF	NZL	Christian Gray
5	MF	VAN	Timothy Boulet
6	DF	NZL	Adam Bell
7	MF	NZL	Cameron Howieson
8	FW	ESP	Gerard Garriga
9	MF	NZL	Angus Kilkolly
10	FW	NZL	Dylan Manickum
11	FW	NZL	Ryan de Vries
12	DF	NZL	Regont Murati

No.	Pos.	Nation	Player
13	DF	NZL	Nathan Lobo
14	DF	NZL	Jordan Vale
15	MF	NZL	Aidan Carey
16	FW	NZL	Joe Lee
18	GK	URU	Sebastián Ciganda
19	FW	NZL	Liam Gillion
20	FW	ARG	Emiliano Tade
22	MF	CHN	Zhou Tong
23	DF	NZL	Alfie Rogers
24	GK	NZL	Joe Wallis
25	MF	NZL	Michael den Heijer

== León ==
Manager: (Argentina) Nicolás Larcamón

Note: Flags indicate national team as defined under FIFA eligibility rules; some limited exceptions apply. Players may hold more than one non-FIFA nationality.

No.	Pos.	Nation	Player
1	GK	MEX	Alfonso Blanco
3	GK	MEX	Óscar García
5	MF	MEX	Fidel Ambríz
6	DF	COL	William Tesillo
7	DF	MEX	Iván Moreno
8	MF	MEX	José Rodríguez
9	FW	MEX	Brian Rubio
11	MF	MEX	Elías Hernández
13	MF	ECU	Ángel Mena
16	MF	COL	Omar Fernández
17	FW	URU	Nicolás López
18	FW	URU	Federico Viñas

No.	Pos.	Nation	Player
20	FW	MEX	Alfonso Alvarado
21	DF	COL	Jaine Barreiro
22	DF	ARG	Adonis Frías
23	MF	ESP	Borja Sánchez
24	DF	MEX	Osvaldo Rodríguez
25	DF	MEX	Paul Bellón
28	MF	MEX	David Ramírez
29	MF	ARG	Lucas Romero
30	GK	MEX	Rodolfo Cota
32	FW	MEX	Sebastián Santos
34	DF	MEX	Óscar Villa

== Fluminense ==
Manager: (Brazil) Fernando Diniz

Note: Flags indicate national team as defined under FIFA eligibility rules; some limited exceptions apply. Players may hold more than one non-FIFA nationality.

No.	Pos.	Nation	Player
1	GK	BRA	Fábio
2	DF	BRA	Samuel Xavier
4	DF	BRA	Marlon
5	MF	BRA	Alexsander
7	MF	BRA	André
8	MF	BRA	Matheus Martinelli
9	FW	BRA	John Kennedy
10	MF	BRA	Ganso
11	FW	BRA	Keno
12	DF	BRA	Marcelo
14	FW	ARG	Germán Cano
20	MF	BRA	Danielzinho

No.	Pos.	Nation	Player
21	MF	COL	Jhon Arias
22	GK	BRA	Pedro Rangel
23	DF	BRA	Guga
29	MF	BRA	Thiago Santos
30	DF	BRA	Felipe Melo
33	DF	BRA	Nino
38	FW	COL	Yony González
40	DF	BRA	Barbosa
44	DF	BRA	David Braz
45	MF	BRA	Lima
98	GK	BRA	Vitor Eudes

== Manchester City ==
Manager: (Spain) Pep Guardiola

Note: Flags indicate national team as defined under FIFA eligibility rules; some limited exceptions apply. Players may hold more than one non-FIFA nationality.

No.	Pos.	Nation	Player
2	DF	ENG	Kyle Walker
3	DF	POR	Rúben Dias
4	MF	ENG	Kalvin Phillips
5	DF	ENG	John Stones
6	DF	NED	Nathan Aké
8	MF	CRO	Mateo Kovačić
10	MF	ENG	Jack Grealish
16	MF	ESP	Rodri
18	GK	GER	Stefan Ortega
19	FW	ARG	Julián Alvarez
20	MF	POR	Bernardo Silva
21	DF	ESP	Sergio Gómez

No.	Pos.	Nation	Player
24	DF	CRO	Joško Gvardiol
25	DF	SUI	Manuel Akanji
27	MF	POR	Matheus Nunes
31	GK	BRA	Ederson
33	GK	ENG	Scott Carson
47	MF	ENG	Phil Foden
52	FW	NOR	Oscar Bobb
68	DF	ENG	Max Alleyne
76	MF	ESP	Mahamadou Susoho
82	DF	ENG	Rico Lewis
92	FW	ENG	Micah Hamilton

== Urawa Red Diamonds ==
Manager: (Poland) Maciej Skorża

Note: Flags indicate national team as defined under FIFA eligibility rules; some limited exceptions apply. Players may hold more than one non-FIFA nationality.

No.	Pos.	Nation	Player
1	GK	JPN	Shusaku Nishikawa
2	DF	JPN	Hiroki Sakai
3	MF	JPN	Atsuki Ito
4	DF	JPN	Takuya Iwanami
5	DF	NOR	Marius Høibråten
8	MF	JPN	Yoshio Koizumi
9	FW	NED	Bryan Linssen
10	MF	JPN	Shoya Nakajima
11	FW	GUI	José Kanté
14	MF	JPN	Takahiro Sekine
15	MF	JPN	Takahiro Akimoto
16	GK	JPN	Ayumi Niekawa

No.	Pos.	Nation	Player
17	FW	NED	Alex Schalk
19	MF	JPN	Ken Iwao
21	MF	JPN	Tomoaki Okubo
22	MF	JPN	Kai Shibato
25	MF	JPN	Kaito Yasui
26	DF	JPN	Takuya Ogiwara
27	MF	THA	Ekanit Panya
28	DF	DEN	Alexander Scholz
30	FW	JPN	Shinzo Koroki
31	GK	JPN	Shun Yoshida
66	DF	JPN	Ayumu Ohata
