= 2023 CONCACAF Champions League final =

Two-legged club soccer final match

- Event: 2023 CONCACAF Champions League
| León | Los Angeles FC |
| (Mexico) | (United States) |
| 3 | 1 |

First leg
| León | Los Angeles FC |
| 2 | 1 |
- Date: May 31, 2023
- Venue: Estadio León, León, Guanajuato, Mexico
- Referee: Walter López (Guatemala)
- Attendance: 20,517
- Weather: Partly cloudy, 88 °F (31 °C)

Second leg
| Los Angeles FC | León |
| 0 | 1 |
- Date: June 4, 2023
- Venue: BMO Stadium, Los Angeles, California, U.S.
- Referee: Iván Barton (El Salvador)
- Attendance: 22,413
- Weather: Sunny, 65 °F (18 °C)

The 2023 CONCACAF Champions League final was the final round of the 2023 CONCACAF Champions League, the 15th and final edition of the CONCACAF Champions Cup under the Champions League name, and overall the 58th edition of the premier club association football competition organized by CONCACAF, the regional governing body of North America, Central America, and the Caribbean.

The final was contested in a two-legged home-and-away series by Los Angeles FC of Major League Soccer and Club León of Liga MX. León hosted the first leg at Estadio León in León, Guanajuato, Mexico, on May 31 and won 2–1. Los Angeles FC hosted the second leg at BMO Stadium in Los Angeles, California, United States, on June 4 and lost 1–0. The final was pushed back to allow for the Clasura 2023 finals to take place in Mexico. León won 3–1 on aggregate.

== Venues ==
| (United States) Los Angeles | (Mexico) León |
|---|---|
| BMO Stadium | Estadio León |
| Capacity: 22,000 | Capacity: 31,297 |

== Road to the final ==
Both teams in the final had yet to win a CONCACAF Champions League, but previously reached the finals in previous editions. León and Los Angeles FC last played each other in the 2020 CONCACAF Champions League's round of 16, which LAFC won 3–2 on aggregate.

=== León ===
Club León previously qualified for the final round of the 1993 CONCACAF Champions' Cup, but lost in the round-robin group to Costa Rica's Deportivo Saprissa on goal difference. They had some league success in the 2010s and qualified for multiple editions of the CONCACAF Champions League, but were eliminated in three consecutive years by MLS teams. Their best finish during this stretch came in the 2022 edition, where they lost in the quarterfinals to eventual champions Seattle Sounders FC. León qualified for the 2023 edition—their fifth in the continental tournament—as the runners-up in the 2021 Apertura playoffs in Liga MX.

The team were drawn against Panamanian side Tauro in the round of 16 and won 1–0 in the first leg, which was played in Panama City. Iván Moreno scored the lone goal of the match in the 55th minute from close range after receiving a deflected ball from a Tauro defender. León won 2–0 in the second leg to advance 3–0 on aggregate to the quarterfinals; Brian Rubio and Elías Hernández both scored in the first half.

In the quarterfinals, León played Haitian side Violette AC, who had earned an upset victory against Austin FC of MLS in the previous round. In the first leg at Estadio León, the hosts won 5–0 with a brace from Víctor Dávila in the second half and two goals in stoppage time. The team lost 2–1 in the second leg, conceding twice to Violette's Miche-Naider Chéry, but advanced 6–2 on aggregate to their first semifinals.

León met fellow Liga MX side Tigres in the semifinals and played away in the first leg. Dávila opened the scoring in the fifth minute, but a pair of goals created by Tigres winger Luis Quiñones near halftime gave the hosts a 2–1 win. During the first 15 minutes of the second leg, Fidel Ambríz and Ángel Mena scored for León to take the lead on aggregate. Raymundo Fulgencio equalized for Tigres, but a 79th-minute strike by Adonis Frías from a corner kick clinched a 3–1 win and 4–3 aggregate victory for León.

=== Los Angeles FC ===
Los Angeles FC (LAFC) entered MLS as an expansion team in 2018. The club qualified for the 2020 CONCACAF Champions League as winners of the 2019 MLS Supporters' Shield and advanced to the final, which had been delayed to December due to the COVID-19 pandemic and was played in Orlando, Florida. LAFC lost 2–1 to Tigres UANL, becoming the fourth MLS team and second from the United States to finish as runners-up under the modern Champions League format.

As MLS Cup 2022 champions and Supporters' Shield holders, LAFC qualified for their second Champions League. They lost several key players in the offseason, including midfielder Latif Blessing and forwards Cristian Arango and Cristian Tello, and signed several replacements but still lacked a new center forward option. The club were drawn against Costa Rican side Alajuelense, the 2022 CONCACAF League runners-up, in the round of 16 and won the away leg 3–0 with a hat-trick scored by Denis Bouanga. LAFC lost 2–1 in the second leg at home but advanced with a 4–2 aggregate score.

In the quarterfinals, LAFC faced fellow MLS side Vancouver Whitecaps FC from Canada and won 6–0 on aggregate, scoring thrice in each leg. The away leg in Vancouver was decided by a trio of goals within ten minutes during the second half—Bouanga's brace and assist to Kwadwo Opoku. Captain Carlos Vela scored twice in the second leg—from a penalty kick and close range in the first half—and was joined after half-time by José Cifuentes, who entered as a substitute and struck both posts with his goal.

The semifinal was a rematch of the MLS Cup final played five months earlier between LAFC and the Philadelphia Union, who had also finished as runners-up in the Supporters' Shield race. A league fixture for LAFC was rescheduled to accommodate the semifinal series as well as potential advancement to the final. LAFC drew 1–1 in the first leg and won 3–0 in the second leg to advance from the semifinals. They became the first MLS team to advance to a second Champions League final under the current format. LAFC's league matches against St. Louis City SC and Atlanta United FC were rescheduled due to conflicts with the two legs of the final as well as the 2023 U.S. Open Cup.

=== Summary of results ===
Note: In all results below, the score of the finalist is given first (H: Home; A: Away).

| (United States) Los Angeles FC | | | | Round | (Mexico) León | | | |
|---|---|---|---|---|---|---|---|---|
| Opponent | Agg. | 1st leg | 2nd leg | | Opponent | Agg. | 1st leg | 2nd leg |
| (Costa Rica) Alajuelense | 4–2 | 3–0 (A) | 1–2 (H) | Round of 16 | (Panama) Tauro | 3–0 | 1–0 (A) | 2–0 (H) |
| (Canada) Vancouver Whitecaps FC | 6–0 | 3–0 (A) | 3–0 (H) | Quarterfinals | (Haiti) Violette | 6–2 | 5–0 (H) | 1–2 (A) |
| (United States) Philadelphia Union | 4–1 | 1–1 (A) | 3–0 (H) | Semifinals | (Mexico) UANL | 4–3 | 1–2 (A) | 3–1 (H) |

== Format ==
The final will be played in a home-and-away two-legged series, with the team with the better performance in previous rounds hosting the second leg. Unlike in earlier rounds, away goals will not be a tiebreaker in the second leg. Instead, 30 minutes of extra time (divided into 15-minute periods) is played if the match is tied after regulation time; a sixth substitute is also permitted during extra time. Additional substitutions are permitted for players showing signs of a concussion or a traumatic head injury after up to three minutes of evaluation by a medical officer. If the score is still tied after extra time, a penalty shoot-out is used to determine the winner (Regulations Article 12.8).

=== Performance ranking ===
In the final, the finalist which has the better performances in previous rounds host the second leg.

| Pos | Team | Pld | W | D | L | GF | GA | GD | Pts | Host |
|---|---|---|---|---|---|---|---|---|---|---|
| 1 | (United States Soccer Federation) Los Angeles FC | 6 | 4 | 1 | 1 | 14 | 3 | +11 | 13 | Second leg |
| 2 | (Mexican Football Federation) Club León | 6 | 4 | 0 | 2 | 13 | 5 | +8 | 12 | First leg |

Source: CONCACAF
Rules for classification: 1) Points; 2) Goal difference; 3) Goals scored; 4) Away goals scored; 5) Wins; 6) Away wins; 7) Disciplinary points (1 point for yellow card, 3 points for indirect red card, 4 points for direct red card, 5 points for yellow card and direct red card); 8) Drawing of lots (Regulations Article 12.9.5).

== Matches ==
=== First leg ===
==== Details ====
May 31, 2023
22:00 (20:00 UTC−6)

| León (Mexico) | 2–1 | (United States) Los Angeles FC |
|---|---|---|
| Tesillo 8'; Mena 45+5' (pen.) | Report | Bouanga 90+6' |

Estadio León, León
Attendance: 20,517
Referee: Walter López (Guatemala)

| GK | 30 | (Mexico) Rodolfo Cota |
| RB | 3 | (Mexico) Iván Moreno |
| CB | 21 | (Colombia) Jaine Barreiro | (yellow card) 90+8' |
| CB | 22 | (Argentina) Adonis Frías | (yellow card) 43' |
| LB | 6 | (Colombia) William Tesillo (c) | (yellow card) 33' |
| RM | 13 | (Ecuador) Ángel Mena | | (substituted off) 63' |
| CM | 26 | (Mexico) Fidel Ambríz |
| CM | 29 | (Argentina) Lucas Romero | (yellow card) 65' |
| LM | 19 | (Colombia) Yairo Moreno | | (substituted off) 8' |
| CF | 7 | (Chile) Víctor Dávila | | (substituted off) 85' |
| CF | 20 | (Mexico) Alfonso Alvarado | | (substituted off) 63' |
Substitutes:
| GK | 1 | (Mexico) Alfonso Blanco |
| GK | 40 | (Mexico) Óscar García |
| DF | 23 | (Ecuador) Byron Castillo |
| DF | 24 | (Mexico) Osvaldo Rodríguez | | (substituted on) 63' |
| DF | 25 | (Mexico) Paul Bellón |
| MF | 8 | (Mexico) José Iván Rodríguez |
| MF | 11 | (Mexico) Elías Hernández | | (substituted on) 8' | (substituted off) 63' |
| MF | 12 | (Costa Rica) Joel Campbell | | (substituted on) 63' |
| MF | 27 | (Mexico) Jesús Angulo |
| FW | 15 | (Mexico) Brian Rubio | | (substituted on) 85' |
| FW | 18 | (Argentina) Lucas Di Yorio | | (substituted on) 63' |
Manager:
(Argentina) Nicolás Larcamón

| GK | 77 | (United States) John McCarthy |
| RB | 24 | (United States) Ryan Hollingshead | (yellow card) 45+4' | (substituted off) 60' |
| CB | 2 | (Honduras) Denil Maldonado | (yellow card) 45' |
| CB | 33 | (United States) Aaron Long |
| LB | 12 | (Ecuador) Diego Palacios |
| RM | 11 | (United States) Timothy Tillman | | (substituted off) 85' |
| CM | 6 | (Spain) Ilie Sánchez | | (substituted off) 68' |
| LM | 20 | (Ecuador) José Cifuentes | (yellow card) 89' |
| RF | 22 | (Ghana) Kwadwo Opoku | | (substituted off) 60' |
| CF | 10 | (Mexico) Carlos Vela (c) |
| LF | 99 | (Gabon) Dénis Bouanga |
Substitutes:
| GK | 1 | (Switzerland) Eldin Jakupović |
| DF | 18 | (Mexico) Erik Dueñas | | (substituted on) 85' |
| DF | 30 | (Spain) Sergi Palencia | | (substituted on) 60' |
| DF | 80 | (United States) Julian Gaines |
| MF | 17 | (Peru) Daniel Crisostomo |
| MF | 19 | (Poland) Mateusz Bogusz | | (substituted on) 68' |
| MF | 23 | (United States) Kellyn Acosta |
| FW | 7 | (Croatia) Stipe Biuk | | (substituted on) 60' |
| FW | 27 | (Mexico) Nathan Ordaz |
Manager:
(United States) Steve Cherundolo

Assistant referees:
Luis Aroldo Ventura (Guatemala)
Humberto Panjoj (Guatemala)
Fourth official:
Mario Escobar (Guatemala)
Video assistant referee:
Drew Fischer (Canada)
Assistant video assistant referees:
Guillermo Pacheco Larios (Mexico)

=== Second leg ===
==== Details ====
June 4, 2023
21:00 (18:00 UTC−7)

| Los Angeles FC (United States) | 0–1 | (Mexico) León |
|---|---|---|
| | Report | Di Yorio 20' |

BMO Stadium, Los Angeles
Attendance: 22,413
Referee: Iván Barton (El Salvador)

| GK | 77 | (United States) John McCarthy |
| RB | 30 | (Spain) Sergi Palencia | | (substituted off) 56' |
| CB | 3 | (Colombia) Jesús David Murillo | (yellow card) 75' |
| CB | 14 | (Italy) Giorgio Chiellini | | (substituted off) 46' |
| CB | 33 | (United States) Aaron Long | | (substituted off) 69' |
| LB | 12 | (Ecuador) Diego Palacios | (yellow card) 19' |
| CM | 6 | (Spain) Ilie Sánchez | (yellow card) 32' | (substituted off) 63' |
| CM | 23 | (United States) Kellyn Acosta |
| RF | 10 | (Mexico) Carlos Vela (c) | (yellow card) 52' | (substituted off) 64' |
| CF | 99 | (Gabon) Dénis Bouanga |
| LF | 19 | (Poland) Mateusz Bogusz |
Substitutes:
| GK | 1 | (Switzerland) Eldin Jakupović |
| DF | 2 | (Honduras) Denil Maldonado | | (substituted on) 69' |
| DF | 18 | (Mexico) Erik Dueñas |
| DF | 24 | (United States) Ryan Hollingshead | (yellow card) 90' | (substituted on) 56' |
| DF | 80 | (United States) Julian Gaines |
| MF | 11 | (United States) Timothy Tillman | | (substituted on) 63' |
| MF | 17 | (Peru) Daniel Crisostomo |
| MF | 20 | (Ecuador) José Cifuentes | | (substituted on) 46' |
| FW | 7 | (Croatia) Stipe Biuk | | (substituted on) 64' |
| FW | 22 | (Ghana) Kwadwo Opoku |
| FW | 27 | (Mexico) Nathan Ordaz |
Manager:
(United States) Steve Cherundolo

| GK | 30 | (Mexico) Rodolfo Cota |
| RB | 3 | (Mexico) Iván Moreno | (yellow card) 76' | (substituted off) 87' |
| CB | 21 | (Colombia) Jaine Barreiro | (yellow card) 19' |
| CB | 22 | (Argentina) Adonis Frías | (yellow card) 81' |
| LB | 6 | (Colombia) William Tesillo (c) |
| DM | 29 | (Argentina) Lucas Romero |
| RW | 13 | (Ecuador) Ángel Mena | | (substituted off) 69' |
| AM | 26 | (Mexico) Fidel Ambríz | (yellow card) 80' |
| LW | 11 | (Mexico) Elías Hernández | | (substituted off) 86' |
| CF | 18 | (Argentina) Lucas Di Yorio | | (substituted off) 76' |
| CF | 7 | (Chile) Víctor Dávila |
Substitutes:
| GK | 1 | (Mexico) Alfonso Blanco |
| GK | 40 | (Mexico) Óscar García |
| DF | 23 | (Ecuador) Byron Castillo |
| DF | 24 | (Mexico) Osvaldo Rodríguez | | (substituted on) 87' |
| DF | 25 | (Mexico) Paul Bellón |
| DF | 34 | (Mexico) Óscar Villa |
| MF | 8 | (Mexico) José Iván Rodríguez |
| MF | 27 | (Mexico) Jesús Angulo |
| MF | 28 | (Mexico) David Ramírez |
| FW | 12 | (Costa Rica) Joel Campbell | (yellow card) 90+9' | (substituted on) 69' |
| FW | 15 | (Mexico) Brian Rubio | | (substituted on) 76' |
| FW | 20 | (Mexico) Alfonso Alvarado | | (substituted on) 86' |
Manager:
(Argentina) Nicolás Larcamón
