= 2024–25 Club León season =

Club León
2024–25 season
- Manager: Jorge Bava
- Stadium: Estadio León
- Liga MX Torneo Apertura: 11th
- Clausura: 1st
- Leagues Cup: Group stage
- Top goalscorer: League: Jhonder Cádiz (3); All: Jhonder Cádiz (3)
- Average home league attendance: 17,607 (A) 25,871 (C)
- Biggest defeat: Pumas UNAM 4–1 León
Home colours	Away colours

The 2024–25 season was Club León's 82nd season in existence and their 13th consecutive appearance in the top flight.

== First-team squad ==
Note: Flags indicate national team as defined under FIFA eligibility rules; some limited exceptions apply. Players may hold more than one non-FIFA nationality.

No.	Pos.	Nation	Player
1	GK	MEX	Alfonso Blanco
2	DF	MEX	Mauricio Isais
3	DF	MEX	Pedro Hernández
5	MF	MEX	Fidel Ambríz
7	DF	MEX	Iván Moreno
8	MF	CHI	Luciano Cabral
10	MF	COL	James Rodríguez
12	GK	MEX	Óscar Jiménez (on loan from América)
14	FW	MEX	Ettson Ayón
15	MF	COL	Edgar Guerra
16	MF	URU	Alan Medina
17	MF	MEX	Jesús Hernández (on loan from Pachuca)
18	MF	MEX	Andrés Guardado
20	FW	MEX	Alfonso Alvarado
21	DF	COL	Jaine Barreiro

No.	Pos.	Nation	Player
22	DF	ARG	Adonis Frías
23	GK	MEX	Óscar García
24	DF	MEX	Osvaldo Rodríguez
25	DF	MEX	Paul Bellón
26	DF	MEX	Salvador Reyes
27	MF	MEX	Ángel Estrada
28	DF	MEX	David Ramírez
31	MF	MEX	Sebastián Santos
32	DF	MEX	Luis Cervantes
33	MF	MEX	Héctor Uribe
34	DF	MEX	Víctor Barajas
35	DF	MEX	Diego Luna
—	FW	VEN	Jhonder Cádiz
—	FW	COL	Stiven Mendoza

=== Other players under contract ===
Note: Flags indicate national team as defined under FIFA eligibility rules; some limited exceptions apply. Players may hold more than one non-FIFA nationality.

No.	Pos.	Nation	Player
—	DF	MEX	Óscar Villa
—	MF	URU	Gonzalo Nápoli
—	FW	URU	Nicolás López
—	FW	URU	Federico Viñas

=== Out on loan ===
Note: Flags indicate national team as defined under FIFA eligibility rules; some limited exceptions apply. Players may hold more than one non-FIFA nationality.

No.	Pos.	Nation	Player
—	GK	MEX	Rodolfo Cota (at América)
—	DF	ECU	Byron Castillo (at Peñarol)
—	MF	COL	Omar Fernández (at Everton)

No.	Pos.	Nation	Player
—	MF	URU	Federico Martínez (at Everton)
—	MF	MEX	José Iván Rodríguez (at América)

== Transfers ==
=== In ===
Pos.	Player	Transferred from	Fee	Date	Source
MF	(Chile) Luciano Cabral	(Chile) Coquimbo Unido	€1,000,000	2 July 2024	
FW	(Venezuela) Jhonder Cádiz	(Portugal) F.C. Famalicão	Undisclosed	9 July 2024	
MF	(Colombia) Stiven Mendoza	(Turkey) Adana Demirspor	Free	10 July 2024	
MF	(Uruguay) Diego Hernández	(Brazil) Botafogo	Loan	29 July 2024	
MF	(Colombia) James Rodriguez	(Spain) Rayo Vallecano	Free	13 January 2025	

=== Out ===
Pos.	Player	Transferred to	Fee	Date	Source
MF	(Chile) Luciano Cabral	(Argentina) Independiente	€961,000	1 January 2025	

== Competitions ==
=== Overall record ===
Competition	First match	Last match	Starting round	Record							
Competition	First match	Last match	Starting round	Pld	W	D	L	GF	GA	GD	Win %
Liga MX Apertura	7 July 2024	8 November 2024	Matchday 1	17	3	9	5	21	23	−2	17.65
Liga MX Clausura	10 January 2025		Matchday 1	9	7	2	0	16	9	+7	77.78
Leagues Cup	28 July 2024	5 August 2024	Group stage	2	0	1	1	2	3	−1	0.00
Total				28	10	12	6	39	35	+4	35.71

Last updated: 26 February 2025
Source: Soccerway

=== Torneo Apertura ===
Pos	Team	Pld	W	D	L	GF	GA	GD	Pts	Qualification
9	Guadalajara	17	7	4	6	24	15	+9	25	Qualification for the play-in round (Note: Teams ranked 7th to 10th qualified for the play-in round.)
10	Atlas	17	5	7	5	17	23	−6	22	Qualification for the play-in round
11	León	17	3	9	5	21	23	−2	18	
12	Juárez	17	5	2	10	22	36	−14	17	
13	Necaxa	17	3	6	8	20	26	−6	15	

Source: Liga MX
Rules for classification: 1) Points; 2) Goal difference; 3) Number of goals scored; 4) Head-to-head results between tied teams; 5) Number of goals scored away; 6) Highest relegation coefficient; 7) Fair Play points

==== Results summary ====
Overall								Home						Away					
Pld	W	D	L	GF	GA	GD	Pts	W	D	L	GF	GA	GD	W	D	L	GF	GA	GD
17	3	9	5	21	23	−2	18	2	6	1	9	5	+4	1	3	4	12	18	−6

Last updated: 26 February 2025.

==== Results by round ====
Round	1	2	3	4
Ground	A	H	A	H
Result	L	D	D	D
Position				

Updated to match(es) played on 21 July 2024. Source:
A = Away; H = Home; W = Win; D = Draw; L = Loss

==== Matches ====
The match schedule was released on 6 June 2024.

7 July 2024 1	UNAM	4–1	León	Mexico City
12:00 UTC−6	Ruvalcaba 11', 88'; Cervantes 26' (o.g.); Martínez 80'; López (yellow card) 90+3'		Alvarado 31'; Guerra (yellow card) 61'; Frías (yellow card) 74'; Bellón (yellow card) 87'	Stadium: Estadio Olímpico Universitario; Referee: Maximiliano Quintero Hernández

13 July 2024 2	León	0–0	Pachuca	León
17:00 UTC−6	Medina (yellow card) 13'; Alvarado (yellow card) 47'; Cabral (yellow card) 77'; Barajas (red card) 90+7'		Cabral (yellow card) 69'; Barreto (yellow card) 69'; Idrissi (red card) 27'; Moreno (yellow card) 90+4'	Stadium: Estadio León; Referee: Salvador Pérez Villalobos

16 July 2024 3	Puebla	2–2	León	Puebla
21:00 UTC−6	Cavallini 13', 90+1' (pen.); Ferrareis (yellow card) 60'; De Buen (yellow card) 72'		Cádiz 26', 87', (yellow card) 88'	Stadium: Estadio Cuauhtémoc; Referee: Marco Antonio Ortiz Nava

21 July 2024 4	León	1–1	Necaxa	León
19:05 UTC−6	Barreiro (yellow card) 31'; Cádiz 63' (pen.); Reyes (yellow card) 69'		Arce 57'; Montes (yellow card) 69'	Stadium: Estadio León; Referee: Luis Alfredo García Rodríguez

=== Torneo Clausura ===
Pos	Team	Pld	W	D	L	GF	GA	GD	Pts	Qualification
4	Tigres UANL	17	10	3	4	24	14	+10	33	Qualification for the quarter–finals (Note: The first six places in the table qualified for the Liguilla quarter-finals.)
5	Necaxa	17	10	1	6	36	29	+7	31	Qualification for the quarter–finals
6	León	17	9	3	5	24	21	+3	30	Qualification for the quarter–finals
7	Monterrey	17	8	4	5	32	23	+9	28	Qualification for the play-in round (Note: Teams ranked 7th to 10th qualified for the play-in round.)
8	Pachuca	17	8	4	5	29	23	+6	28	Qualification for the play-in round

Source: Liga MX
Rules for classification: 1) Points; 2) Goal difference; 3) Number of goals scored; 4) Head-to-head results between tied teams; 5) Number of goals scored away; 6) Highest relegation coefficient; 7) Fair Play points

=== Leagues Cup ===
==== Group stage ====
Pos	Team	Pld	W	PW	PL	L	GF	GA	GD	Pts	Qualification	POR	COL	LEO
1	(United States Soccer Federation) Portland Timbers	2	2	0	0	0	6	1	+5	6	Advance to knockout stage	—	3–0	—
2	(United States Soccer Federation) Colorado Rapids	2	0	1	0	1	1	5	−4	2	Advance to knockout stage	—	—	—
3	(Mexican Football Federation) León	2	0	0	1	1	2	3	−1	1		1–2	1–1	—

Source: Leagues Cup
Rules for classification: Tiebreakers

28 July Group stage	León (Mexico)	1–2	(United States) Portland Timbers	Portland, United States
19:30 PDT	Medina 12', (yellow card) 33'	Report	Williamson (yellow card) 20'; McGraw 41', 90', (yellow card) 59'; Miller (yellow card) 45+2'	Stadium: Providence Park; Referee: Walter Lopez

5 August Group stage	León (Mexico)	1–1 (3–4 p)	(United States) Colorado Rapids	Commerce City, United States
19:00 MDT	Bellón (yellow card) 58'; Ambríz (yellow card) 64'; Guerra 77'	Report	Ronan (yellow card) 40'; Bassett (yellow card) 45'; Rafael Navarro (yellow card) 90+5', (goal) 90+7'	Stadium: Dick's Sporting Goods Park; Referee: Julio Luna
	Penalties
	Cádiz (penalty scored); Barreiro (penalty scored); Guardado (penalty missed); Mendoza (penalty scored); Reyes (penalty missed)		(penalty scored) Mihailovic; (penalty scored) Bassett; (penalty scored) Rafael Navarro; (penalty scored) Bombito; (penalty missed) Maxsø

=== Copa Guanajuato ===
Semi-finals
26 June – Estadio León
Celaya	1
Salamanca	0
26 June – Estadio León
León	3
Irapuato	0

Final
29 June – Estadio León
León	0 (5)
Celaya	0 (4)
Third place
29 June – Estadio Sergio León Chávez
Irapuato	1
Salamanca	3
