= Pedro Hernández (footballer, born 2000) =

Mexican footballer (born 2000)

Personal information
- Full name: Pedro Hernández García
- Date of birth: 31 October 2000 (age 26)
- Place of birth: Monterrey, Nuevo León, Mexico
- Height: 1.76 m (5 ft 9 in)
- Position: Centre-back

Team information
- Current team: Celaya
- Number: 103

Youth career
- 2017–2019: Veracruz
- 2019–2021: León

Senior career*
Years	Team	Apps	(Gls)
2020–2025	León	8	(0)
2024	→ Celaya (loan)	12	(0)
2025–	Celaya	6	(0)
- * Club domestic league appearances and goals as of 5 April 2025

Pedro Hernández García (born 31 October 2000) is a Mexican professional footballer who plays as a centre-back for Liga de Expansión MX club Celaya.

== Career statistics ==
=== Club ===
As of 24 April 2022

Club	Season	League			Cup		Continental		Other		Total	
Club	Season	Division	Apps	Goals	Apps	Goals	Apps	Goals	Apps	Goals	Apps	Goals
León	2020–21	Liga MX	5	0	—		—		—		5	0
León	2021–22	Liga MX	2	0	—		1 (Note: Appearance in CONCACAF Champions League)	0	—		3	0
León	Total		7	0	—		1	0	—		8	0
Career total			7	0	0	0	1	0	0	0	8	0

== Honours ==
León

- Liga MX: Guardianes 2020
- CONCACAF Champions League: 2023
