= Alfonso Alvarado =

Mexican footballer (born 2000)

Personal information
- Full name: José Alfonso Alvarado Pérez
- Date of birth: 15 March 2000 (age 26)
- Place of birth: El Platanito, Sinaloa, Mexico
- Height: 1.75 m (5 ft 9 in)
- Position: Forward

Team information
- Current team: León
- Number: 19

Youth career
- 2017–2021: Monterrey

Senior career*
Years	Team	Apps	(Gls)
2017–2023	Monterrey	47	(3)
2021–2022	→ Raya2 (loan)	4	(2)
2022–2023	→ León (loan)	28	(3)
2023–2024	León	46	(8)
2025	Monterrey	13	(1)
2025–	León	37	(8)

International career^{‡}
2017	Mexico U17	3	(0)
Medal record
Men's football
Representing Mexico
CONCACAF Under-17 Championship
First place	2017 Panama	Team
- * Club domestic league appearances and goals as of 21 November 2026 ‡ National team caps and goals as of 25 March 2016

José Alfonso Alvarado Pérez (born 15 March 2000), also known as Plátano, is a Mexican professional footballer who plays as a forward for Liga MX club León.

Alvarado was born in the town of El Platanito, Guasave Municipality, Sinaloa.

== Career statistics ==
=== Club ===
As of match played on 21 November 2026

Club	Season	League			Cup		Continental		Global		Other		Total	
Club	Season	Division	Apps	Goals	Apps	Goals	Apps	Goals	Apps	Goals	Apps	Goals	Apps	Goals
Monterrey	2018–19	Liga MX	1	0	1	0	—		—		—		2	0
Monterrey	2019–20	Liga MX	4	0	8	1	—		—		—		12	1
Monterrey	2020–21	Liga MX	16	1	—		5 (Note: Appearances in CONCACAF Champions League)	2	—		—		21	3
Monterrey	2021–22	Liga MX	26	2	—		—		1 (Note: Appearance in FIFA Club World Cup)	0	—		27	2
Monterrey	Total		47	3	9	1	5	2	1	0	—		62	6
Raya2 (loan)	2021–22	Liga de Expansión MX	4	2	—		—		—		—		4	2
León (loan)	2022–23	Liga MX	28	3	—		8	0	—		—		36	3
León	2023–24	Liga MX	30	5	—		—		1	0	1 (Note: Appearances in Leagues Cup)	0	32	5
León	2024–25	Liga MX	16	3	—		—		—		1	0	17	3
León	Total		46	8	—		—		1	0	2	0	49	8
Monterrey	2024–25	Liga MX	13	1	—		3	0	3	0	—		19	1
Monterrey	2025–26	Liga MX	1	0	—		—		—		—		1	0
Monterrey	Total		14	1	—		3	0	3	0	—		20	1
León	2025–26	Liga MX	22	2	—		—		—		—		22	2
León	2026–27	Liga MX	15	6	—		—		—		4	0	19	6
León	Total		37	8	—		—		—		4	0	41	8
Career total			176	25	9	1	16	2	5	0	6	0	207	28

== Honours ==
Monterrey

- Copa MX: 2019–20
- CONCACAF Champions League: 2021

León

- CONCACAF Champions League: 2023

Mexico U17

- CONCACAF Under-17 Championship: 2017
