= Elías Hernández =

Mexican footballer (born 1988)

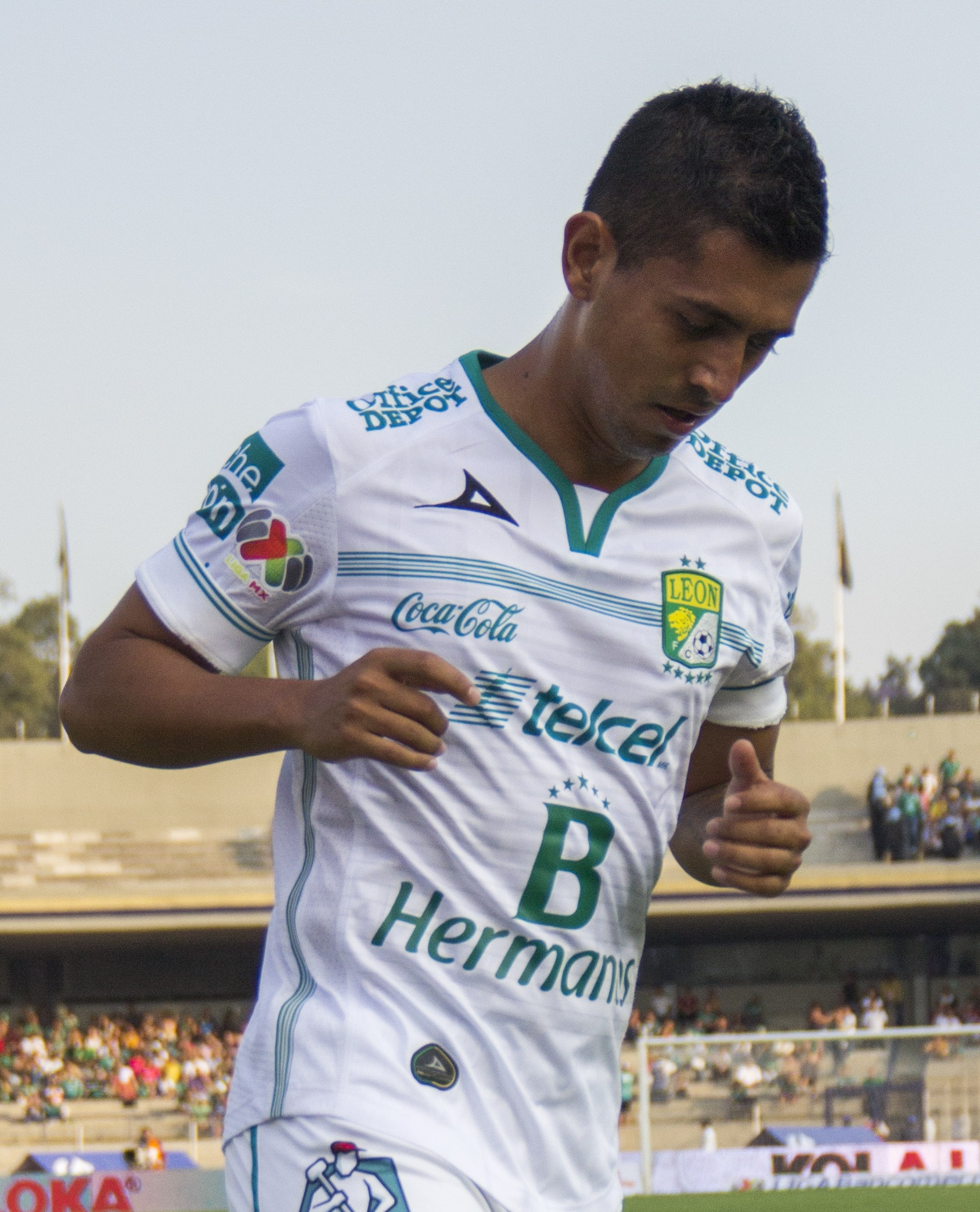
- Hernández with León in 2016

Personal information
- Full name: Elías Hernán Hernández Jacuinde
- Date of birth: 29 April 1988 (age 38)
- Place of birth: Morelia, Michoacán, Mexico
- Height: 1.70 m (5 ft 7 in)
- Position: Winger

Youth career
- Morelia

Senior career*
Years	Team	Apps	(Gls)
2007–2011	Morelia	128	(21)
2007–2008	→ Mérida (loan)	12	(5)
2011	Pachuca	18	(4)
2012–2014	Tigres UANL	44	(5)
2013–2014	→ León (loan)	37	(4)
2014–2018	León	140	(27)
2018–2021	Cruz Azul	84	(16)
2021–2024	León	81	(5)
2024–2025	Atlético La Paz	24	(3)

International career^{‡}
2010–2018	Mexico	25	(4)
Medal record
Representing Mexico
CONCACAF Gold Cup
Winner	CONCACAF Gold Cup	2011
- * Club domestic league appearances and goals as of 28 March 2025 ‡ National team caps and goals as of 12 September 2018

Elías Hernán Hernández Jacuinde (born 29 April 1988) is a Mexican professional footballer who plays as a winger for Liga de Expansión MX club Atlético La Paz.

== Club career ==
=== Morelia ===
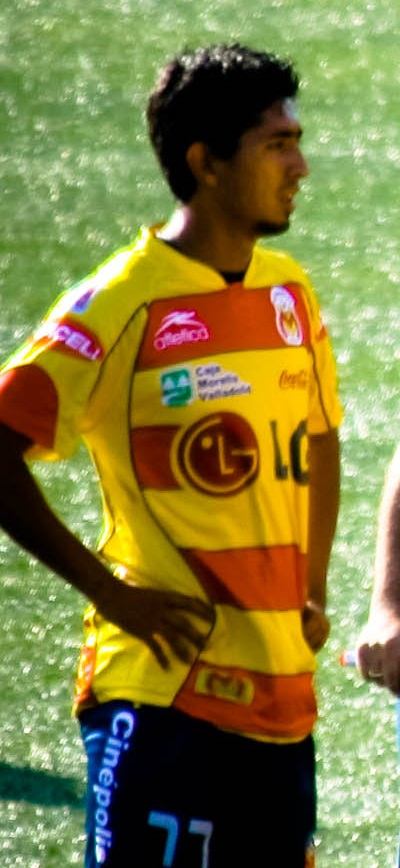
Hernández with Morelia in 2009

Hernández made his professional debut on 27 October 2007, in a 1–0 win over Tigres UANL, he came off the bench in the 60th minute for former Morelia player Wanderson Da Silva.

Even though Hernández had little playing time at the time, he did score the go ahead goal against Cruz Azul, which Morelia won 2–1. He scored his second goal on 17 August 2008, against UNAM. He played in the final of the 2009 InterLiga, where Chivas beat Morelia 4–2 on penalties, after a 1–1 draw. Despite the loss, his team qualified to the Copa Libertadores due to reaching the final. During the Apertura 2009 and Bicentario 2010 seasons, Hernández helped Morelia reach the semi-finals, scoring 12 goals and registering seven assists in 42 matches. He also played in all six games of the 2010 Copa Libertadores for Morelia, registering three assists. On 2 September 2010, Morelia beat New England Revolution 2–1, to win the 2010 SuperLiga.

=== Pachuca ===
In June 2011, Hernández joined Pachuca for $40 million Mexican pesos ($3.2 million US dollars).

=== Tigres UANL ===
On 5 January 2012, Hernández was presented as the latest signing of Tigres UANL.

==== Loan to Club León ====
On 30 May 2013, Hernández joined Club León on loan for the 2013–14 season.

=== Club León ===
On 4 June 2014, Elías joined León permanently.

=== Cruz Azul ===
On 24 May 2018, Hernández joined Cruz Azul. On 2018 July 21, he debuted and scored his first goal in the 93rd minute in a 3–0 victory against Puebla.

=== Return to León ===
On 2 June 2021, Hernández returned to León, looking for more playing time. On 5 June 2023, he played in the final of the 2023 CONCACAF Champions League, where León beat Los Angeles FC 1–0. On 13 May 2024, he announced his retirement, after running out his contract with León.

== International career ==
Hernández got his first call up by interim coach Enrique Meza for a friendly match against Spain. He made his debut in the match coming in the 66th minute for Giovani dos Santos. He scored his first international goal against Colombia on 7 September 2010, which gave Mexico the victory.

== Career statistics ==
=== Club ===
As of 15 May 2024

Appearances and goals by club, season and competition
Club	Season	League			Cup		Continental		Other		Total	
Club	Season	Division	Apps	Goals	Apps	Goals	Apps	Goals	Apps	Goals	Apps	Goals
Monarcas Morelia	2007–08	Mexican Primera División	14	1	—		—		—		14	1
Monarcas Morelia	2008–09	Mexican Primera División	32	3	—		—		4 (Note: Appearances in InterLiga)	0	36	3
Monarcas Morelia	2009–10	Mexican Primera División	42	12	—		6 (Note: Appearances in Copa Libertadores)	0	—		48	12
Monarcas Morelia	2010–11	Mexican Primera División	40	5	—		—		5 (Note: Appearances in SuperLiga)	1	45	6
Monarcas Morelia	Total		128	21	—		6	0	9	1	143	22
Mérida (loan)	2007–08	Ascenso MX	12	5	—		—		—		12	5
Pachuca	2011–12	Liga MX	18	4	—		—		—		18	4
Tigres UANL	2011–12	Liga MX	21	3	—		—		—		21	3
Tigres UANL	2012–13	Liga MX	23	2	—		4 (Note: Appearances in CONCACAF Champions League)	2	—		27	4
Tigres UANL	Total		44	5	—		4	2	—		48	7
León (loan)	2013–14	Liga MX	37	4	1	0	6 (Note: Appearances in Copa Libertadores)	0	—		44	4
León	2014–15	Liga MX	33	2	—		2 (Note: Appearances in CONCACAF Champions League)	1	—		35	3
León	2015–16	Liga MX	38	8	9	0	—		—		47	8
León	2016–17	Liga MX	36	7	7	1	—		—		43	8
León	2017–18	Liga MX	33	10	4	1	—		—		37	11
León	Total		177	31	21	2	8	1	—		206	34
Cruz Azul	2018–19	Liga MX	29	9	6	2	—		—		35	11
Cruz Azul	2019–20	Liga MX	22	5	—		—		4 (Note: One appearance and one goal in Supercopa MX and three appearances and one goal in Leagues Cup)	2	26	7
Cruz Azul	2020–21	Liga MX	33	2	—		5 (Note: Appearances in CONCACAF Champions League)	1	—		38	3
Cruz Azul	Total		84	16	6	2	5	1	4	2	99	21
León	2021–22	Liga MX	32	5	—		4 (Note: Appearances in CONCACAF Champions League)	2	4 (Note: One appearance in Campeón de Campeones and three appearances in Leagues Cup)	0	40	7
León	2022–23	Liga MX	21	0	—		8 (Note: Appearances in CONCACAF Champions League)	2	—		29	2
León	2023–24	Liga MX	28	0	—		1 (Note: Appearance in FIFA Club World Cup)	0	3 (Note: Appearances in Leagues Cup)	1	32	1
León	Total		81	5	—		13	4	7	1	101	10
Career total			544	87	27	4	36	8	20	4	627	103

=== International ===
As of match played 12 September 2018

National team	Year	Apps	Goals
Mexico	2010	4	1
Mexico	2011	3	0
Mexico	2012	4	0
Mexico	2015	1	0
Mexico	2016	1	0
Mexico	2017	9	3
Mexico	2018	3	0
Total		25	4

=== International goals ===
Scores and results list Mexico's goal tally first.

Goal	Date	Venue	Opponent	Score	Result	Competition
1.	7 September 2010	Estadio Universitario, San Nicolás de los Garza, Mexico	Colombia	1–0	1–0	Friendly
2.	28 June 2017	NRG Stadium, Houston, United States	Ghana	1–0	1–0	Friendly
3.	1 July 2017	CenturyLink Field, Seattle, United States	Paraguay	2–0	2–1	Friendly
4.	9 July 2017	Qualcomm Stadium, San Diego, United States	El Salvador	2–1	3–1	2017 CONCACAF Gold Cup

== Honours ==
Morelia

- North American SuperLiga: 2010

León

- Liga MX: Apertura 2013, Clausura 2014
- CONCACAF Champions League: 2023
- Leagues Cup: 2021

Cruz Azul

- Liga MX: Guardianes 2021
- Copa MX: Apertura 2018
- Supercopa MX: 2019
- Leagues Cup: 2019

Mexico

- CONCACAF Gold Cup: 2011
- CONCACAF Cup: 2015

Individual

- Liga MX top assist provider: Clausura 2015
- CONCACAF Gold Cup top assist provider: 2017
- Liga MX Best XI: Apertura 2017, Apertura 2018
- Liga MX Player of the Month: August 2018
- CONCACAF Champions League Best XI: 2023
