= Luciano Cabral =

Argentine-born Chilean footballer (born 1995)

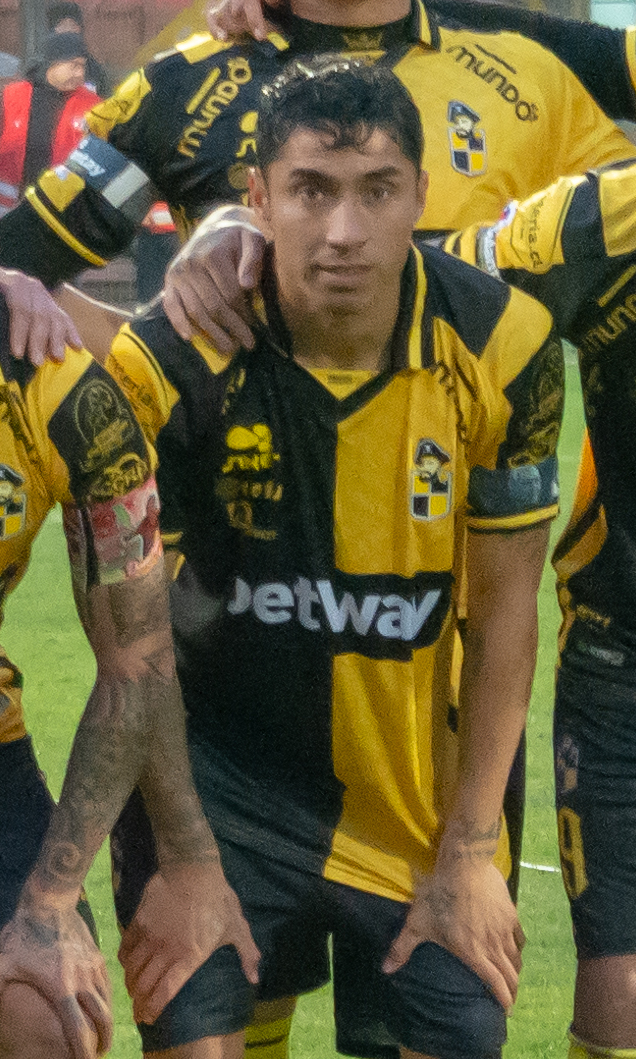
- Cabral with Coquimbo Unido in 2023

Personal information
- Full name: Luciano Javier Cabral Melgarejo
- Date of birth: 26 April 1995 (age 31)
- Place of birth: General Alvear, Argentina
- Height: 1.70 m (5 ft 7 in)
- Position: Attacking midfielder

Team information
- Current team: Independiente
- Number: 10

Youth career
- C.A.I.
- 2011–2014: Argentinos Juniors

Senior career*
Years	Team	Apps	(Gls)
2011	C.A.I.	2	(0)
2014–2017	Argentinos Juniors	55	(4)
2016	→ Athletico Paranaense (loan)	6	(0)
2022	Sportivo El Porvenir	–	(–)
2023–2024	Coquimbo Unido	43	(8)
2024–2025	León	15	(1)
2025–	Independiente	41	(3)

International career^{‡}
2014	Argentina U20		
2015	Chile U20	4	(0)
2024–	Chile	3	(0)
- * Club domestic league appearances and goals as of 17:42, 6 June 2026 (UTC) ‡ National team caps and goals as of 25 March 2025

Luciano Javier Cabral Melgarejo (born April 26, 1995) is a footballer who plays as an attacking midfielder for Independiente. Born in Argentina, he represents Chile internationally.

== Club career ==
Cabral returned to professional football for the 2023 season, after signing with Coquimbo Unido in the Chilean Primera División.

In the second half of 2024, Cabral moved to Mexico and signed with León in the Liga MX.

In 2025, Cabral returned to his country of birth and joined Independiente on a deal for three seasons.

== International career ==
Cabral represented Argentina at under-20 level in the 2014 COTIF Tournament.

In 2015, he represented Chile at under-20 level in the South American Championship.

At senior level, Cabral was included in the preliminary squad for the 2024 Copa América. Later, he received his first call-up for the 2026 FIFA World Cup qualification matches against Brazil and Colombia in October 2024. He made his debut on 19 November 2024 in a World Cup qualifier against Venezuela at the Estadio Nacional Julio Martínez Prádanos. He substituted Arturo Vidal in the 67th minute and scored the goal that was overturned after VAR review, as Chile won 4–2.

== Personal life ==
He is naturalized Chilean since his grandfather was born in Chile.

In June 2018, he was given a 9 1/2 years prison sentence due to being linked along with his father to a homicide occurred in January 2017 in Mendoza, Argentina. Due to his good behavior, In September 2022, he came out on parole.

== Career statistics ==
=== International ===
As of match played 25 March 2025

Appearances and goals by national team and year
National team	Year	Apps	Goals
Chile	2024	1	0
Chile	2025	2	0
Total		3	0
