= Fidel Ambríz =

Mexican footballer (born 2003)

Fidel Ambriz
Personal information
- Full name: Fidel Daniel Ambriz González
- Date of birth: 21 March 2003 (age 23)
- Place of birth: León, Guanajuato, Mexico
- Height: 1.75 m (5 ft 9 in)
- Position: Midfielder

Team information
- Current team: Monterrey
- Number: 5

Youth career
- 2015–2019: León

Senior career*
Years	Team	Apps	(Gls)
2019–2024	León	92	(7)
2024–	Monterrey	72	(3)

International career^{‡}
2021	Mexico U19	4	(1)
2021–2022	Mexico U20	13	(3)
2023–	Mexico U23	14	(2)
2024	Mexico	1	(0)
Medal record
Men's football
Representing Mexico
Pan American Games
Bronze medal – third place	2023 Santiago	Team
Central American and Caribbean Games
Gold medal – first place	2023 San Salvador	Team
- * Club domestic league appearances and goals as of 21 November 2026 ‡ National team caps and goals as of 31 May 2024

Fidel Daniel Ambriz González (born 21 March 2003) is a Mexican professional footballer who plays as a midfielder for Liga MX club Monterrey and the Mexico national team.

== Club career ==
=== León ===
Born in León, Guanajuato, Ambríz began his career with León, joining the club's youth academy. He made his professional debut on 9 November 2019 against Toluca in a 4–0 victory.

=== Monterrey ===
On 28 August 2024, Monterrey reached an agreement with León to sign Ambríz.

== International career ==
Ambríz was called up to the under-20 side by Luis Ernesto Pérez to participate at the 2021 Revelations Cup, captaining in all three matches, where Mexico won the competition. The following year, he was named captain for the under-20 side that would participate at the 2022 CONCACAF U-20 Championship in order to participate at the FIFA U-20 World Cup and Olympics. Mexico failed to qualify following a quarter-final defeat to Guatemala.

Ambríz made his debut with the senior national team on 31 of May 2024, in a friendly match against Bolivia, a match which took place at Chicago's Soldier Field.

== Career statistics ==
=== Club ===
As of match played on 21 November 2026

Club	Season	League			Cup		Continental		Global		Other		Total	
Club	Season	Division	Apps	Goals	Apps	Goals	Apps	Goals	Apps	Goals	Apps	Goals	Apps	Goals
León	2019–20	Liga MX	2	0	—		—		—		—		2	0
León	2020–21	Liga MX	4	1	—		—		—		2 (Note: One appearance in Leagues Cup, one appearance in Campeón de Campeones)	0	6	1
León	2021–22	Liga MX	25	0	—		4 (Note: Appearances in CONCACAF Champions League)	1	—		—		29	1
León	2022–23	Liga MX	34	3	—		7	1	—		—		41	4
León	2023–24	Liga MX	22	3	—		—		1 (Note: Appearances in FIFA Club World Cup)	0	3 (Note: Appearances in Leagues Cup)	0	26	3
León	2024–25	Liga MX	5	0	—		—		—		2	0	7	0
León	Total		92	7	—		11	2	1	0	7	0	111	9
Monterrey	2024–25	Liga MX	30	1	—		2	0	—		—		32	1
Monterrey	2025–26	Liga MX	30	2	—		2	0	4	0	1	0	37	2
Monterrey	2026–27	Liga MX	12	0	—		—		—		6	0	18	0
Monterrey	Total		72	3	—		4	0	4	0	7	0	87	3
Career total			164	10	0	0	15	2	5	0	14	0	198	12

=== International ===
Appearances and goals by national team and year
National team	Year	Apps	Goals
Mexico	2024	1	0
Total		1	0

== Honours ==
León

- Liga MX: Guardianes 2020
- CONCACAF Champions League: 2023
- Leagues Cup: 2021

Mexico Youth

- Revelations Cup: 2021, 2022
- Central American and Caribbean Games: 2023
- Pan American Bronze Medal: 2023

Individual

- CONCACAF Champions League Best Young Player: 2023
- CONCACAF Champions League Best XI: 2023
