= Adonis Frías =

Argentine footballer (born 1998)

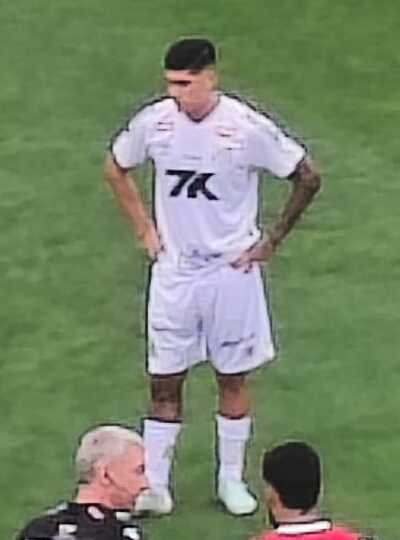
- Frías playing for Santos in 2025

Personal information
- Full name: Adonis Uriel Frías
- Date of birth: 17 March 1998 (age 28)
- Place of birth: Florencio Varela, Argentina
- Height: 1.88 m (6 ft 2 in)
- Position: Centre-back

Team information
- Current team: Atlas
- Number: 19

Youth career
- 2004–2016: Defensa y Justicia

Senior career*
Years	Team	Apps	(Gls)
2017–2022	Defensa y Justicia	73	(4)
2018–2019	→ Los Andes (loan)	19	(0)
2023–2025	León	69	(3)
2025–2026	Santos	29	(1)
2026–	Atlas	0	(0)
- * Club domestic league appearances and goals as of 28 August 2026

Adonis Uriel Frías (born 17 March 1998) is an Argentine professional footballer who plays as a centre-back for Liga MX club Atlas.

== Career ==
=== Defensa y Justicia ===
Born in Villa Mónica, a neighborhood of Florencio Varela, Frías joined Defensa y Justicia's youth sides in 2004, from a local club. He progressed through the youth categories before signing a professional contract in 2016, and was promoted to the main squad ahead of the 2017 season.

==== Loan to Los Andes ====
In August 2018, after failing to make his first team debut, Frías was loaned to Primera B Nacional side Los Andes for one year. He made his senior debut on 16 September, starting in a 1–0 home loss to Sarmiento.

Frías featured in nineteen games for Los Andes in the in 2018–19 Primera B Nacional, but was unable to prevent team relegation.

==== Breakthrough ====
Back to Defensa for the 2019–20 campaign, Frías made his first team – and Primera División – debut for the club on 17 February 2020, coming on as a late substitute for Rubén Botta in a 2–1 away win over Estudiantes. He started to feature regularly under manager Hernán Crespo, and scored his first senior goal against Lanús on 23 January 2021, netting the opener in the 2020 Copa Sudamericana Final, which they won 3–0.

=== León ===
On 2 January 2023, Frías moved abroad for the first time in his career after being presented at Liga MX side León. He immediately became a starter for the side, helping them to win the 2023 CONCACAF Champions League (where he featured in both legs of the finals) and also played in the 2023 FIFA Club World Cup.

On 10 December 2024, Frías renewed his contract with León.

=== Santos ===
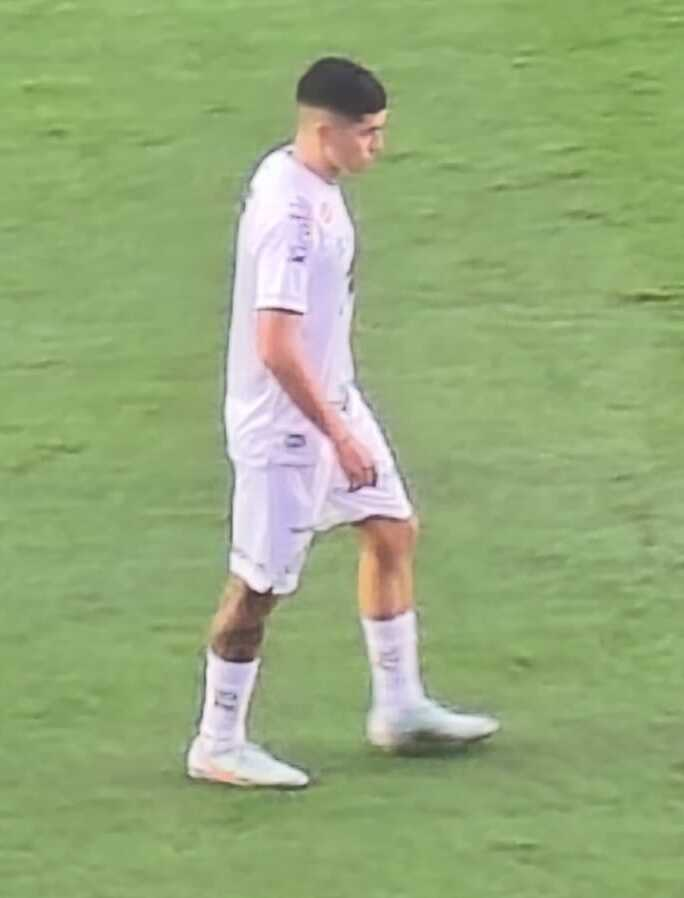
Frías in action for Santos in 2025

On 2 September 2025, Campeonato Brasileiro Série A club Santos announced the signing of Frías on a contract until December 2028. He made his club debut twelve days later, replacing Guilherme in a 1–1 away draw against Atlético Mineiro.

Frías scored his first goal for Peixe on 10 May 2026, netting his side's second in a 2–0 home win over Red Bull Bragantino.

=== Atlas ===
On 27 August 2026, Frías signed with Atlas.

== Career statistics ==
As of 14 August 2026

Appearances and goals by club, season and competition
Club	Season	League			National Cup		League Cup		Continental		State league		Other		Total	
Club	Season	Division	Apps	Goals	Apps	Goals	Apps	Goals	Apps	Goals	Apps	Goals	Apps	Goals	Apps	Goals
Los Andes	2018–19	Primera B Nacional	19	0	0	0	—		—		—		—		19	0
Defensa y Justicia	2019–20	Primera División	4	0	0	0	0	0	1 (Note: Appearance(s) in Copa Libertadores)	0	—		0	0	5	0
Defensa y Justicia	2020–21	Primera División	3 (Note: Soccerway counts Copa de la Liga Profesional appearances as league appearances.)	0	2	0	1	0	12 (Note: Three appearances in Copa Libertadores, nine appearances and one goal in Copa Sudamericana)	1	—		—		18	1
Defensa y Justicia	2021	Primera División	35	0	1	0	—		6	0	—		2 (Note: Appearance(s) in Recopa Sudamericana)	0	44	0
Defensa y Justicia	2022	Primera División	31	4	2	0	—		2 (Note: Appearance(s) in Copa Sudamericana)	0	—		—		35	4
Defensa y Justicia	Total		73	4	5	0	1	0	21	1	—		2	0	102	5
León	2022–23	Liga MX	14	0	0	0	—		7 (Note: Appearance(s) in CONCACAF Champions League)	1	—		—		21	1
León	2023–24	Liga MX	35	2	0	0	—		—		—		4 (Note: Three appearances in Leagues Cup, one appearances in FIFA Club World Cup)	0	39	2
León	2024–25	Liga MX	15	1	0	0	—		—		—		2 (Note: Appearance(s) in Leagues Cup)	0	17	1
León	2025–26	Liga MX	5	0	0	0	—		—		—		2	0	7	0
León	Total		69	3	0	0	—		7	1	—		8	0	84	4
Santos	2025	Série A	13	0	—		—		—		—		—		13	0
Santos	2026	Série A	9	1	3	1	—		5	0	7 (Note: Appearance(s) in Campeonato Paulista)	0	—		24	2
Santos	Total		22	1	3	1	—		5	0	7	0	—		37	2
Career total			183	8	8	1	1	0	33	2	7	0	10	0	242	11

== Honours ==
Defensa y Justicia

- Copa Sudamericana: 2020
- Recopa Sudamericana: 2021

León

- CONCACAF Champions League: 2023

Individual

- CONCACAF Champions League Best XI: 2023
