= Óscar Villa (footballer, born 2001) =

Mexican footballer

Personal information
- Full name: Óscar Eduardo Villa Domínguez
- Date of birth: 24 February 2001 (age 25)
- Place of birth: Pánuco, Veracruz, Mexico
- Height: 1.76 m (5 ft 9 in)
- Position: Full-back

Team information
- Current team: Puebla
- Number: 15

Youth career
- 2016–2019: Pachuca
- 2019–2022: León

Senior career*
Years	Team	Apps	(Gls)
2021–2026	León	21	(0)
2024–2025	→ Cancún (loan)	24	(1)
2026	→ UdeG (loan)	9	(0)
2026–	Puebla	12	(0)

International career^{‡}
2023	Mexico U23	10	(0)
Medal record
Men's football
Representing Mexico
Central American and Caribbean Games
Gold medal – first place	2023 San Salvador	Team
- * Club domestic league appearances and goals as of 20 November 2026 ‡ National team caps and goals as of 7 July 2023

Óscar Eduardo Villa Domínguez (born 24 February 2001) is a Mexican professional footballer who plays as a full-back for Liga MX club Puebla.

== Club career ==
Villa began his career at the academy of Pachuca going through their U15 and U17 before moving to León's academy, eventually making his professional debut on 23 February 2022 in a 1–0 CONCACAF Champions League win against Guastatoya playing the full match. On 4 March 2022, he made his Liga MX debut in a 1–0 win against Juárez, also playing the whole game.

In July 2024, he was loaned to Cancún and in February 2026, he was loaned out once again, this time to UdeG.

On 5 June 2026, Villa signed with Puebla.

== Career statistics ==
=== Club ===
As of match played on 20 November 2026

Club	Season	League			Cup		Continental		Other		Total	
Club	Season	Division	Apps	Goals	Apps	Goals	Apps	Goals	Apps	Goals	Apps	Goals
León	2021–22	Liga MX	4	0	—		3 (Note: Appearances in CONCACAF Champions League)	0	—		7	0
León	2022–23	Liga MX	13	0	—		3	0	—		16	0
León	2023–24	Liga MX	3	0	—		—		—		3	0
León	2025–26	Liga MX	1	0	—		—		1 (Note: Appearances in Leagues Cup)	0	2	0
León	Total		21	0	—		6	0	1	0	28	0
Cancún (loan)	2024–25	Liga de Expansión MX	24	1	—		—		—		24	1
UdeG (loan)	2025–26	Liga de Expansión MX	9	0	—		—		—		9	0
Puebla	2026–27	Liga MX	12	0	—		—		2	0	14	0
Career total			66	1	0	0	6	0	3	0	75	1

== Honours ==
León

- Leagues Cup: 2021
- CONCACAF Champions League: 2023

Mexico U23

- Central American and Caribbean Games: 2023
