= 2021 Leagues Cup =

Association football tournament

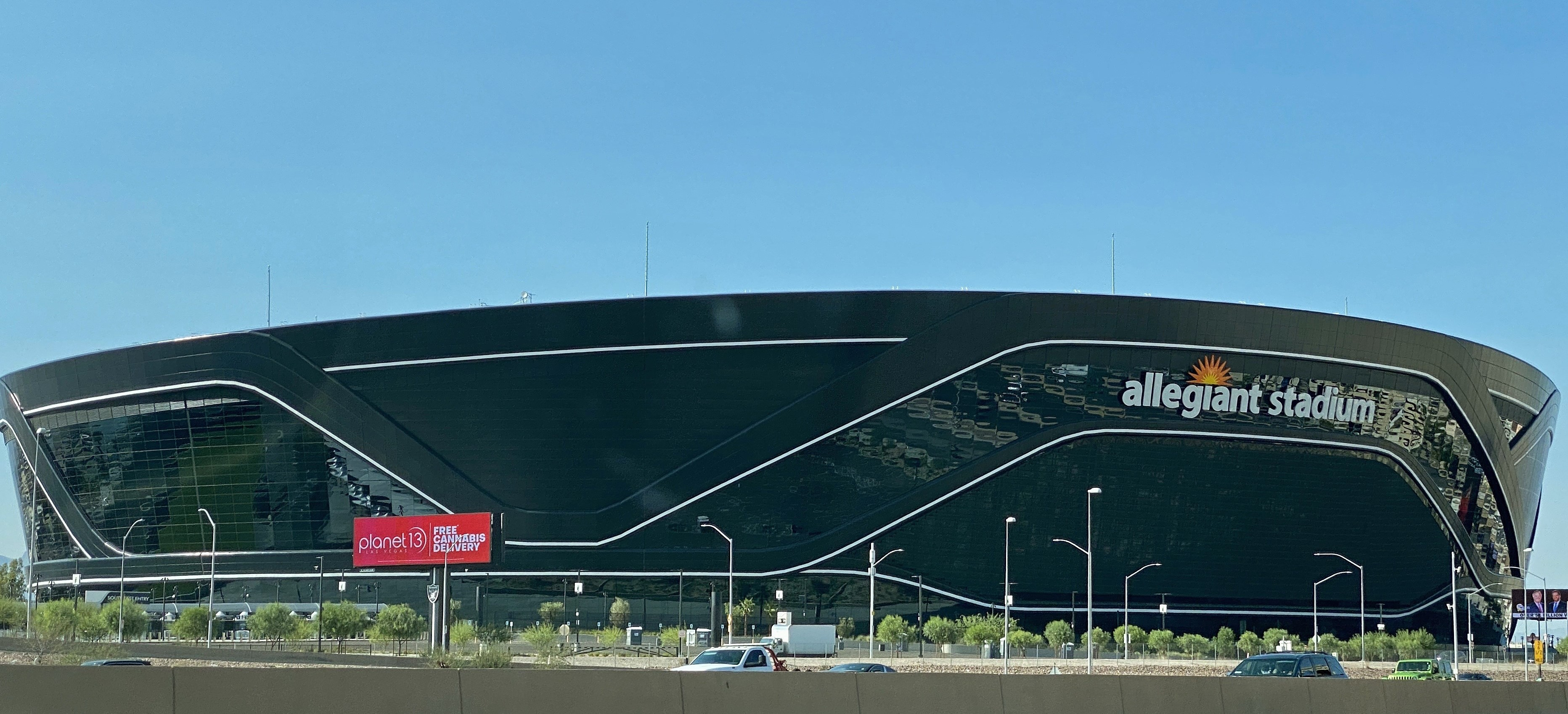
- The Allegiant Stadium in Paradise, Nevada hosted the final

Tournament details
- Host country: United States
- Dates: August 10 – September 22
- Teams: 8 (from 2 associations)

Final positions
- Champions: (Mexico) León (1st title)
- Runners-up: (United States) Seattle Sounders FC

Tournament statistics
- Matches played: 7
- Goals scored: 21 (3 per match)
- Attendance: 98,635 (14,091 per match)
- Top scorer(s): (Ecuador) Ángel Mena (3 goals)

The 2021 Leagues Cup was the second edition of the Leagues Cup organized by Major League Soccer (MLS) and Liga MX. The tournament was originally planned to include sixteen teams but was later reduced to eight teams.

The 2020 edition of the tournament was canceled in May 2020 due to the ongoing COVID-19 pandemic in North America. In the final at Allegiant Stadium, Paradise, Nevada, near Las Vegas, León defeated Seattle Sounders FC 3–2 to win their first title.

== Qualification ==
The top two Major League Soccer teams from each conference in the 2020 season who did not qualify for the 2021 CONCACAF Champions League qualified for the Leagues Cup.

The top four Liga MX from the 2020–21 season aggregate table who are not competing in the 2021 CONCACAF Champions League semifinals or the 2021 Campeones Cup qualified for the Leagues Cup.

(United States) (Canada) Major League Soccer (4 berths)
Team	Qualification method
(United States) Sporting Kansas City	1st, Western Conference
(United States) Orlando City SC	4th, Eastern Conference
(United States) Seattle Sounders FC	2nd, Western Conference
(United States) New York City FC	5th, Eastern Conference

(Mexico) Liga MX (4 berths)
Team	Qualification method
León	3rd, aggregate table
UANL	5th, aggregate table
Santos Laguna	6th, aggregate table
UNAM	7th, aggregate table

== Matchups and schedule ==
On July 7, 2021, Major League Soccer and Liga MX announced the Leagues Cup schedule as well as the opening round matches.

== Results ==
Quarterfinals
August 12 – Orlando, FL
(United States) Orlando City SC	0
(Mexico) Santos Laguna	1
August 10 – Seattle, WA
(United States) Seattle Sounders FC	3
(Mexico) UANL	0
August 11 – New York, NY
(United States) New York City FC	1 (2)
(Mexico) UNAM (p)	1 (3)
August 10 – Kansas City, KS
(United States) Sporting Kansas City	1
(Mexico) León	6

Semifinals
September 14 – Seattle, WA
(Mexico) Santos Laguna	0
(United States) Seattle Sounders FC	1
September 15 – Houston, TX
(Mexico) UNAM	0
(Mexico) León	2

Final
September 22 – Paradise, NV
(United States) Seattle Sounders FC	2
(Mexico) León	3

=== Quarterfinals ===
August 12
7:00 p.m. EDT

Orlando City SC (United States)	0–1	(Mexico) Santos Laguna
	Report	Otero 30'

Exploria Stadium, Orlando, Florida
Attendance: 750
Referee: Selvin Brown (Honduras)

August 11
8:00 p.m. EDT

New York City FC (United States)	1–1	(Mexico) UNAM
Castellanos 61'	Report	Rogério 72'
Penalties
Castellanos (penalty scored); Tajouri-Shradi (penalty missed); Callens (penalty missed); Sands (penalty scored); Moralez (penalty missed)	2–3	(penalty missed) Velarde; (penalty missed) Mozo; (penalty scored) Lira; (penalty scored) Galindo; (penalty scored) Saucedo

Yankee Stadium, New York City, New York
Attendance: 17,276
Referee: Oshane Nation (Jamaica)

August 10
7:00 p.m. PDT
(10:00 p.m. EDT)

Seattle Sounders FC (United States)	3–0	(Mexico) UANL
Ruidíaz 23' (pen.); Montero 64'; Lodeiro 70'	Report

Lumen Field, Seattle, Washington
Attendance: 17,077
Referee: John Pitti (Panama)

August 10
7:00 p.m. CDT
(8:00 p.m. EDT)

Sporting Kansas City (United States)	1–6	(Mexico) León
Duke 61'	Report	Colombatto 16'; Fernández 27', 44'; Mena 62'; Meneses 72'; Dávila 79'

Children's Mercy Park, Kansas City, Kansas
Attendance: 15,579
Referee: Juan Gabriel Calderón (Costa Rica)

=== Semifinals ===
September 14
7:00 p.m. PDT
(10:00 p.m. EDT)

Seattle Sounders FC (United States)	1–0	(Mexico) Santos Laguna
Ruidíaz 90+3'	Report

Lumen Field, Seattle, Washington
Attendance: 12,201
Referee: Keylor Herrera (Costa Rica)

September 15
7:00 p.m. CDT
(8:00 p.m. EDT)

León (Mexico)	2–0	(Mexico) UNAM
Colombatto 16'; Ormeño 68'	Report

BBVA Stadium, Houston, Texas
Attendance: 10,928
Referee: Walter López (Guatemala)

=== Final ===
September 22
7:00 p.m. PDT
(10:00 p.m. EDT)

León (Mexico)	3–2	(United States) Seattle Sounders FC
Mena 61', 81' (pen.); Gigliotti 85'	Report	C. Roldan 48'; Benezet 90+2'

Allegiant Stadium, Paradise, Nevada
Attendance: 24,824
Referee: Iván Barton (El Salvador)

Team details

León
Seattle Sounders FC

GK	1	(Mexico) Rodolfo Cota
DF	4	(Colombia) Andrés Mosquera		(substituted off) 59'
DF	21	(Colombia) Jaine Barreiro
DF	6	(Colombia) William Tesillo
DF	24	(Mexico) Osvaldo Rodríguez
MF	25	(Colombia) Omar Fernández		(substituted off) 71'
MF	8	(Mexico) José Iván Rodríguez
MF	22	(Argentina) Santiago Colombatto	(yellow card) 23'
MF	13	(Ecuador) Ángel Mena
FW	7	(Chile) Víctor Dávila		(substituted off) 60'
FW	16	(Chile) Jean Meneses		(substituted off) 60'
Substitutes:
DF	28	(Mexico) David Ramírez		(substituted on) 59'
MF	10	(Mexico) Luis Montes	(yellow card) 90+3'	(substituted on) 71'
FW	20	(Argentina) Emanuel Gigliotti		(substituted on) 60'
MF	11	(Mexico) Elías Hernández		(substituted on) 60'
Manager:
(Argentina) Ariel Holan

GK	24	(United States) Stefan Frei
DF	28	(Colombia) Yeimar Gómez Andrade
DF	3	(Ecuador) Xavier Arreaga	(yellow card) 10'
DF	27	(United States) Shane O'Neill		(substituted off) 83'
MF	16	(El Salvador) Alex Roldán
MF	6	(Brazil) João Paulo	(yellow card) 15'
MF	22	(United States) Kelyn Rowe		(substituted off) 83'
MF	94	(Colombia) Jimmy Medranda		(substituted off) 68'
MF	7	(United States) Cristian Roldan	(yellow card) 82'
MF	12	(Colombia) Fredy Montero		(substituted off) 77'
FW	9	(Peru) Raúl Ruidíaz	(yellow card) 27'
Substitutes:
MF	20	(France) Nicolas Benezet		(substituted on) 83'
MF	84	(United States) Josh Atencio		(substituted on) 83'
DF	11	(Australia) Brad Smith		(substituted on) 68'
FW	17	(United States) Will Bruin		(substituted on) 77'
Manager:
(United States) Brian Schmetzer

== Top goalscorers ==
Club eliminated for this round.

Rank	Player	Club	Goals	By round		
Rank	Player	Club	Goals	QF	SF	F
1	(Ecuador) Ángel Mena	(Mexico) León	3	1		2
2	(Argentina) Santiago Colombatto	(Mexico) León	2	1	1	
2	(Colombia) Omar Fernández	(Mexico) León	2	2		
2	(Peru) Raúl Ruidíaz	(United States) Seattle Sounders FC	2	1	1	
5	(France) Nicolas Benezet	(United States) Seattle Sounders FC	1			1
5	(Argentina) Valentín Castellanos	(United States) New York City FC	1	1		
5	(Chile) Víctor Dávila	(Mexico) León	1	1		
5	(United States) Cameron Duke	(United States) Sporting Kansas City	1	1		
5	(Argentina) Emmanuel Gigliotti	(Mexico) León	1			1
5	(Uruguay) Nicolás Lodeiro	(United States) Seattle Sounders FC	1	1		
5	(Chile) Jean Meneses	(Mexico) León	1	1		
5	(Colombia) Fredy Montero	(United States) Seattle Sounders FC	1	1		
5	(Peru) Santiago Ormeño	(Mexico) León	1		1	
5	(Colombia) Juan Ferney Otero	(Mexico) Santos Laguna	1	1		
5	(United States) Cristian Roldan	(United States) Seattle Sounders FC	1			1
5	(Brazil) Rogério	(Mexico) UNAM	1	1		
