= Jaine Barreiro =

Colombian footballer (born 1994)

Personal information
- Full name: Jaine Stiven Barreiro Solis
- Date of birth: 19 June 1994 (age 32)
- Place of birth: Cali, Valle del Cauca, Colombia
- Height: 1.87 m (6 ft 2 in)
- Position: Centre-back

Senior career*
Years	Team	Apps	(Gls)
2011–2015	Deportes Quindío	106	(3)
2016	Santa Fe	11	(1)
2016–2018	Atlas	45	(5)
2018–2020	Pachuca	33	(2)
2020–2026	León	125	(4)

International career
2011	Colombia U17	6	(0)
2015	Colombia Olympic	2	(0)
- * Club domestic league appearances and goals as of 09:07, 3 December 2023 (UTC)

Jaine Stiven Barreiro Solis (born 19 June 1994) is a Colombian professional footballer who plays as a centre-back for Liga MX club León.

== Club career ==
Barreiro started his career with Deportes Quindío, debuting for the team in a 3–0 defeat to Deportivo Pereira. During the 2013 season, he was called up for the 2013 FIFA U-20 World Cup. On 9 November 2013, his team was relegated, despite a beating Boyacá Chicó 2–1 on the last day of the season. On 26 December 2015, Barrerio joined Independiente Santa Fe. In the summer of 2016, Barreiro joined Liga MX side Atlas, as the replacement for Walter Kannemann. On 14 July 2018, he joined Pachuca. On 17 December 2019, Club León announced the signing of Barreiro.

== Career statistics ==
=== Club ===
As of 14 November 2023

Appearances and goals by club, season and competition
Club	Season	League			National Cup		Continental		Other		Total	
Club	Season	Division	Apps	Goals	Apps	Goals	Apps	Goals	Apps	Goals	Apps	Goals
Deportes Quindío	2011	Categoría Primera A	1	0	1	0	—		—		2	0
Deportes Quindío	2012	Categoría Primera A	13	1	3	1	—		—		16	2
Deportes Quindío	2013	Categoría Primera A	30	1	12	0	—		—		42	1
Deportes Quindío	2014	Categoría Primera B	38	1	9	0	—		2 (Note: Appearances in 2014 promotion/relegation playoffs)	0	49	1
Deportes Quindío	2015	Categoría Primera B	24	0	2	0	—		3 (Note: Appearances in 2015 promotion tournament)	2	29	2
Deportes Quindío	Total		106	3	27	1	0	0	5	2	138	6
Independiente Santa Fe	2016	Categoría Primera A	11	1	0	0	2 (Note: Appearances in Copa Libertadores)	0	—		13	1
Atlas	2016–17	Liga MX	13	2	0	0	—		—		13	2
Atlas	2017–18	Liga MX	32	3	2	0	—		—		34	3
Atlas	Total		45	5	2	0	0	0	0	0	47	5
Pachuca	2018–19	Liga MX	25	2	8	0	—		—		33	2
Pachuca	2019–20	Liga MX	8	0	3	0	—		—		11	0
Pachuca	Total		33	2	11	0	0	0	0	0	44	2
León	2019–20	Liga MX	8	0	0	0	2 (Note: Appearances in CONCACAF Champions League)	0	—		10	0
León	2020–21	Liga MX	39	1	0	0	2	0	1 (Note: Appearances in Leagues Cup)	0	42	1
León	2021–22	Liga MX	37	2	0	0	2	0	2 (Note: Appearances in Campeón de Campeones)	0	41	2
León	2022–23	Liga MX	32	0	0	0	6	0	—		38	0
León	2023–24	Liga MX	7	1	0	0	0	0	3	0	10	1
León	Total		123	4	0	0	12	0	6	0	141	4
Career total			318	15	40	1	14	0	11	2	383	18

== Honours ==
Léon

- Liga MX (1): Guardianes 2020
- CONCACAF Champions League (1): 2023
- Leagues Cup (1): 2021

Individual

- Liga MX Best XI: Guardianes 2020
