= Osvaldo Rodríguez (footballer, born 1996) =

Mexican footballer

Personal information
- Full name: Osvaldo Rodríguez del Portal
- Date of birth: 10 September 1996 (age 30)
- Place of birth: San Luis Potosí, Mexico
- Height: 1.75 m (5 ft 9 in)
- Position: Left-back

Team information
- Current team: Tigres UANL
- Number: 35

Youth career
- 2011–2015: Pachuca

Senior career*
Years	Team	Apps	(Gls)
2015–2016	Pachuca	10	(0)
2016–2024	León	171	(6)
2024–	Tigres UANL	11	(0)

International career^{‡}
2013	Mexico U17	7	(0)
2016	Mexico U23	3	(0)
2021	Mexico	7	(1)
Medal record
Men's football
Representing Mexico
CONCACAF Gold Cup
Runner-up	2021 United States	Team
FIFA U-17 World Cup
Runner-up	2013 United Arab Emirates	Team
- * Club domestic league appearances and goals as of 21 November 2026 ‡ National team caps and goals as of 28 October 2021

Osvaldo Rodríguez del Portal (born 10 September 1996) is a Mexican professional footballer who plays as a left-back for Liga MX club Tigres UANL.

== International career ==
On 12 June 2021, Rodríguez made his senior national team debut in a friendly match against Honduras. He was then selected for the 2021 CONCACAF Gold Cup squad, where he appeared in 3 games, including the final loss to the United States, in which he came on as a substitute for extra time.

== Career statistics ==
=== Club ===
As of 21 November 2026

Club	Season	League			Cup		Continental		Global		Other		Total	
Club	Season	Division	Apps	Goals	Apps	Goals	Apps	Goals	Apps	Goals	Apps	Goals	Apps	Goals
Pachuca	2015–16	Liga MX	10	0	8	0	—		—		—		18	0
León	2016–17	Liga MX	17	1	3	0	—		—		—		20	1
León	2017–18	Liga MX	16	1	8	0	—		—		—		24	1
León	2018–19	Liga MX	8	0	5	0	—		—		—		13	0
León	2019–20	Liga MX	9	0	—		—		—		—		9	0
León	2020–21	Liga MX	26	1	—		1 (Note: Appearances in CONCACAF Champions League)	0	—		3 (Note: Appearances in Leagues Cup)	0	30	1
León	2021–22	Liga MX	29	1	—		1	0	—		—		30	1
León	2022–23	Liga MX	32	1	—		6	0	—		—		38	1
León	2023–24	Liga MX	32	1	—		—		1 (Note: Appearance in FIFA Club World Cup)	0	3	0	36	1
León	2024–25	Liga MX	2	0	—		—		—		2	0	2	0
León	Total		171	6	16	0	8	0	1	0	8	0	204	6
Tigres UANL	2024–25	Liga MX	4	0	—		—		—		—		4	0
Tigres UANL	2025–26	Liga MX	7	0	—		3	0	—		—		10	0
Tigres UANL	Total		11	0	—		3	0	—		—		14	0
Career total			192	6	24	0	11	0	1	0	8	0	236	6

=== International ===
As of match played on 28 October 2021

National team	Year	Apps	Goals
Mexico	2021	7	1
Total		7	1

==== International goals ====
Scores and results list Mexico's goal tally first.

Goal	Date	Venue	Opponent	Score	Result	Competition
1.	27 October 2021	Bank of America Stadium, Charlotte, United States	Ecuador	2–2	2–3	Friendly

== Honours ==
Pachuca

- Liga MX: Clausura 2016

León

- Liga MX: Guardianes 2020
- Leagues Cup: 2021
- CONCACAF Champions League: 2023

Mexico U17

- FIFA U-17 World Cup runner-up: 2013
