= Paul Bellón =

Mexican footballer (born 1997)

Personal information
- Full name: Paul Bellón Saracho
- Date of birth: 4 June 1997 (age 29)
- Place of birth: Guadalajara, Jalisco, Mexico
- Height: 1.89 m (6 ft 2 in)
- Position: Centre-back

Team information
- Current team: León
- Number: 25

Youth career
- 2014–2020: UdeG

Senior career*
Years	Team	Apps	(Gls)
2014–2023	UdeG	66	(2)
2022–2023	→ León (loan)	27	(2)
2023–	León	68	(4)
- * Club domestic league appearances and goals as of 21 November 2026

Paul Bellón Saracho (born 4 June 1997) is a Mexican professional footballer who plays as a centre-back for Liga MX club León.

== Career statistics ==
=== Club ===
As of match played on 21 November 2026

Club	Season	League			Cup		Continental		Other		Total	
Club	Season	Division	Apps	Goals	Apps	Goals	Apps	Goals	Apps	Goals	Apps	Goals
UdeG	2014–15	Ascenso MX	—		1	0	—		—		1	0
UdeG	2017–18	Ascenso MX	—		2	0	—		—		2	0
UdeG	2019–20	Ascenso MX	8	0	1	0	—		—		9	0
UdeG	2020–21	Liga de Expansión MX	23	0	—		—		—		23	0
UdeG	2021–22	Liga de Expansión MX	34	2	—		—		—		34	2
UdeG	2022–23	Liga de Expansión MX	1	0	—		—		—		1	0
UdeG	Total		66	2	4	0	—		—		70	2
León (loan)	2022–23	Liga MX	27	2	—		5 (Note: Appearances in CONCACAF Champions League)	0	—		32	2
León	2023–24	Liga MX	19	2	—		—		1 (Note: Appearance in Leagues Cup)	0	20	2
León	2024–25	Liga MX	31	1	—		—		2	0	33	1
León	2025–26	Liga MX	10	0	—		—		2	0	12	0
León	2026–27	Liga MX	8	1	—		—		2	0	10	1
León	Total		68	4	—		—		7	0	75	4
Career total			161	8	4	0	5	0	7	0	177	8

== Honours ==
León

- CONCACAF Champions League: 2023
