= Brian Rubio =

Mexican footballer (born 1996)

Personal information
- Full name: Brian Alejandro Rubio Rodríguez
- Date of birth: 9 November 1996 (age 29)
- Place of birth: Guadalajara, Mexico
- Height: 1.87 m (6 ft 2 in)
- Position: Forward

Team information
- Current team: Garudayaksa
- Number: 9

Youth career
- 2015–2017: UANL
- 2018–2019: Toluca

Senior career*
| Years | Team | Apps | (Gls) |
| 2018–2021 | UANL | 0 | (0) |
| 2018–2019 | → Toluca (loan) | 0 | (0) |
| 2019–2020 | → Herediano (loan) | 20 | (9) |
| 2020–2021 | → Juárez (loan) | 20 | (3) |
| 2021–2026 | Mazatlán | 88 | (12) |
| 2023 | → León (loan) | 28 | (4) |
| 2025 | → Querétaro (loan) | 7 | (0) |
| 2025 | → Herediano (loan) | 14 | (2) |
| 2026– | Garudayaksa | 1 | (0) |
- * Club domestic league appearances and goals as of 6 September 2026

Brian Alejandro Rubio Rodríguez (born 9 November 1996) is a Mexican professional footballer who plays as a forward for Super League club Garudayaksa.

== Career statistics ==
As of 6 September 2026

| Club | Season | League | | | Cup | | Continental | | Other | | Total | |
| Club | Season | Division | Apps | Goals | Apps | Goals | Apps | Goals | Apps | Goals | Apps | Goals |
|---|---|---|---|---|---|---|---|---|---|---|---|---|
| Toluca (loan) | 2017–18 | Liga MX | — | | 1 | 0 | — | | — | | 1 | 0 |
| Toluca (loan) | 2018–19 | Liga MX | — | | — | | 1 (Note: Appearances in CONCACAF Champions League) | 0 | — | | 1 | 0 |
| Toluca (loan) | Total | | — | | 1 | 0 | 1 | 0 | — | | 2 | 0 |
| Herediano (loan) | 2019–20 | Liga FPD | 20 | 9 | — | | 2 (Note: Appearances in CONCACAF League) | 0 | — | | 22 | 9 |
| Juárez (loan) | 2019–20 | Liga MX | 6 | 1 | 6 | 2 | — | | — | | 12 | 3 |
| Juárez (loan) | 2020–21 | Liga MX | 14 | 2 | — | | — | | — | | 14 | 2 |
| Juárez (loan) | Total | | 20 | 3 | 6 | 2 | — | | — | | 26 | 5 |
| Mazatlán | 2021–22 | Liga MX | 30 | 4 | — | | — | | — | | 30 | 4 |
| Mazatlán | 2022–23 | Liga MX | 15 | 0 | — | | — | | — | | 15 | 0 |
| Mazatlán | 2023–24 | Liga MX | 12 | 1 | — | | — | | — | | 12 | 1 |
| Mazatlán | 2024–25 | Liga MX | 16 | 3 | — | | — | | 5 (Note: Appearances in Leagues Cup) | 1 | 21 | 4 |
| Mazatlán | 2025–26 | Liga MX | 15 | 4 | — | | — | | — | | 15 | 4 |
| Mazatlán | Total | | 88 | 12 | — | | — | | 5 | 1 | 93 | 13 |
| León (loan) | 2022–23 | Liga MX | 14 | 3 | — | | 8 | 2 | — | | 22 | 5 |
| León (loan) | 2023–24 | Liga MX | 14 | 1 | — | | — | | 3 | 0 | 17 | 1 |
| León (loan) | Total | | 28 | 4 | — | | 8 | 2 | 3 | 0 | 39 | 6 |
| Querétaro (loan) | 2025–26 | Liga MX | 7 | 0 | — | | — | | — | | 7 | 0 |
| Herediano (loan) | 2025–26 | Liga FPD | 14 | 2 | — | | 3 (Note: Appearances in CONCACAF Central American Cup) | 2 | — | | 17 | 4 |
| Garudayaksa | 2026–27 | Super League | 1 | 0 | 0 | 0 | — | | — | | 1 | 0 |
| Career total | | | 178 | 30 | 7 | 2 | 14 | 4 | 8 | 1 | 207 | 37 |

== Honours ==
León

- CONCACAF Champions League: 2023
