= William Tesillo =

Colombian footballer (born 1990)

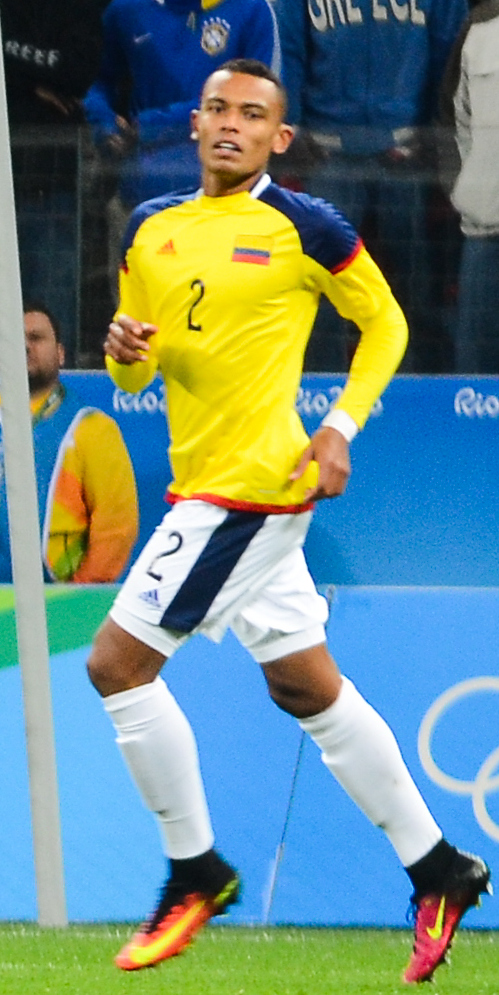
- Tesillo with Colombia at the 2016 Summer Olympics

Personal information
- Full name: William José Tesillo Gutiérrez
- Date of birth: 2 February 1990 (age 36)
- Place of birth: Barranquilla, Colombia
- Height: 1.85 m (6 ft 1 in)
- Positions: Centre-back; left-back

Team information
- Current team: Atlético Nacional
- Number: 16

Youth career
- Boca Juniors de Cali

Senior career*
Years	Team	Apps	(Gls)
2009	Centauros Villavicencio	30	(1)
2010–2015	Deportes Quindío	108	(3)
2014–2015	→ Junior (loan)	83	(0)
2016–2018	Santa Fe	76	(6)
2018–2024	León	173	(7)
2024–	Atlético Nacional	69	(4)

International career^{‡}
2016	Colombia Olympic	6	(0)
2017–	Colombia	30	(1)
Medal record
Representing Colombia
Men's football
Copa América
Third place	2021 Brazil
- * Club domestic league appearances and goals as of 11 December 2025 ‡ National team caps and goals as of 03:35, 25 March 2022 (UTC)

William José Tesillo Gutiérrez (born 2 February 1990) is a Colombian professional footballer who plays as a centre-back for Atlético Nacional and the Colombia national team. He also plays as a left-back.

== Club career ==
=== Early career ===
Born in Barranquilla, Tesillo represented mainly Boca Juniors de Cali as a youth. In 2009, he joined Centauros Villavicencio in the Categoría Primera B, and made his senior debut for the club during the year. His first goal came on 21 March 2009, in a 1–3 away loss against Atlético.

=== Deportes Quindío ===
In 2010, Tesillo moved to Categoría Primera A side Deportes Quindío, along with three other Centauros teammates. He made his debut in the category on 4 April, starting in a 0–1 away loss against Boyacá Chicó.

Tesillo scored his first goal in the top tier on 8 May 2011, netting his team's third in a 4–3 home success over Deportivo Pereira. An undisputed starter for the club, and left with 134 official appearances.

=== Junior ===
On 19 December 2013, Tesillo signed a one-year loan deal with fellow top-tier club Junior. He made his debut for the club the following 25 January, coming on as a late substitute for Luis Enrique Quiñones in a 3–2 win at Atlético Huila.

Tesillo became an undisputed starter at the club, and had his loan extended for a further year in December 2014. He left the club after his loan expired, and the club opted to not activate his buyout clause.

=== Santa Fe ===
On 29 December 2015, Tesillo signed a three-year contract with Independiente Santa Fe. He made his debut for the club on 31 January of the following year by playing the full 90 minutes in a 1–0 win at Boyacá Chicó.

Immediately a first-choice, Tesillo scored his first goal on 21 February 2016, but in a 1–2 away loss against Envigado. He contributed with a career-best four goals in 36 appearances.

== International career ==
Tesillo was named in Colombia's provisional squad for Copa América Centenario but was cut from the final squad. On 15 July, he was included in the 18-man squad ahead of the 2016 Summer Olympics.

Tesillo appeared in all four matches during the tournament, as his side was knocked out by eventual champions Brazil in the quarterfinals.

In May 2018, he was named in Colombia's preliminary 35 man squad for the 2018 World Cup in Russia. However, he did not make the final cut to 23. On June 28, 2019, his missed penalty kick in the shootout, saw Colombia eliminated by Chile in the 2019 Copa America quarterfinals.

== Career statistics ==
=== Club ===
As of 14 December 2016

Club	Season	League			Cup		Continental		Other		Total	
Club	Season	Division	Apps	Goals	Apps	Goals	Apps	Goals	Apps	Goals	Apps	Goals
Centauros Villavicencio	2009	Primera B	30	1	—						30	1
Deportes Quindío	2010	Primera A	16	0	—						16	0
Deportes Quindío	2011	Primera A	32	2	9	0	—				41	2
Deportes Quindío	2012	Primera A	29	0	7	0	—				36	0
Deportes Quindío	2013	Primera A	31	1	10	0	—				41	1
Deportes Quindío	Total		108	3	26	0	0	0	0	0	134	3
Junior	2014	Primera A	41	0	8	0	—				49	0
Junior	2015	Primera A	42	0	7	0	4 (Note: Appearance(s) in Copa Sudamericana)	0	—		53	0
Junior	Total		83	0	15	0	4	0	0	0	102	0
Santa Fe	2016	Primera A	36	4	3	1	8 (Note: Appearance(s) in Copa Libertadores)	1	2 (Note: Appearance(s) in Recopa Sudamericana)	0	48	6
Santa Fe	Total		36	4	3	1	8	1	2	0	48	6
Career total			257	8	44	1	12	1	2	0	315	10

=== International goals ===
As of match played 3 June 2019 Scores and results list Colombia's goal tally first.

No.	Date	Venue	Opponent	Score	Result	Competition
1.	3 June 2019	Estadio El Campín, Bogotá, Colombia	Panama	1–0	3–0	Friendly

== Honours ==
Junior

- Copa Colombia (1): 2015

León

- Liga MX (1): Guardianes 2020
- CONCACAF Champions League (1): 2023
- Leagues Cup (1): 2021

Individual

- Liga MX Best XI: Guardianes 2020, Apertura 2021
- Liga MX All-Star: 2021
