= Alfonso Blanco (footballer) =

Mexican footballer (born 1987)

Personal information
- Full name: Alfonso Blanco Antúnez
- Date of birth: 31 July 1987 (age 39)
- Place of birth: Tamiahua, Veracruz, Mexico
- Height: 1.82 m (6 ft 0 in)
- Position: Goalkeeper

Youth career
- 2005–2007: Pachuca Juniors

Senior career*
Years	Team	Apps	(Gls)
2007	Indios	11	(0)
2008	Pachuca	0	(0)
2008–2009	Cruz Azul	9	(0)
2009	Irapuato	18	(0)
2010	América	0	(0)
2010	Necaxa	7	(0)
2011	León	28	(0)
2012–2020	Pachuca	68	(0)
2013–2014	→ Atlético San Luis (loan)	28	(0)
2020–2025	León	30	(0)

International career
2007	Mexico U20	8	(0)
- * Club domestic league appearances and goals as of 9 February 2025

Alfonso Blanco Antúnez (born 31 July 1987) is a Mexican professional footballer who plays as a goalkeeper.

== Club career ==
Blanco began in Pachuca's youth division teams and then was transferred on loan for Indios de Ciudad Juárez in the 2007 Season after having a good performance during the U-20 World Cup in Canada in 2007.

Blanco arrived to Indios as one of the main bookings for the season but after 4 games and receiving 10 goals he was relegated to the bench for the rest of the season. Indios managed to qualify for the Liguilla in Apertura 2007 and due to an injury from the goalie Joel Barba, Blanco returned to the first team and helped the team get to the finals.

Though he did not make his debut in the Primera División with Pachuca, there were already offers for Blanco from European clubs from Spain, Greece and Holland but in the end, he settled with Cruz Azul. After Óscar Pérez's controversial signing with Tigres UANL, Cruz Azul brought Blanco, possibly, to be a substitute of Yosgart Gutiérrez, the Goalkeeper who took Perez's spot. He played the rest of Clausura 2009 as the Cruz Azul starter goalkeeper but the team finished in the last place of the table. On June 19, 2009, he was signed by Deportivo Irapuato. Later he joined Club León.

Before starting Clausura 2012, it was announced he would play for his original club, Pachuca.

== Career statistics ==
As of 10 February 2024

Appearances and goals by club, season and competition
Club	Season	League			Cup		Continental		Other		Total	
Club	Season	Division	Apps	Goals	Apps	Goals	Apps	Goals	Apps	Goals	Apps	Goals
Indios	2007–08	Primera División A	11	0	—		—		—		11	0
Pachuca	2007–08	Primera División	0	0	—		0	0	0	0	0	0
Cruz Azul	2008–09	Primera División	9	0	—		13	0	—		22	0
Irapuato	2009–10	Liga de Ascenso	18	0	—		—		—		18	0
Necaxa	2009–10	Liga de Ascenso	7	0	—		—		—		7	0
Necaxa	2010–11	Primera División	0	0	—		—		—		0	0
Necaxa	Total		7	0	—		—		—		7	0
León	2010–11	Liga de Ascenso	18	0	—		—		—		18	0
León	2011–12	Liga de Ascenso	10	0	—		—		—		10	0
León	Total		28	0	—		—		—		28	0
Pachuca	2011–12	Primera División	0	0	—		—		—		0	0
Pachuca	2012–13	Liga MX	0	0	10	0	—		—		10	0
Pachuca	2014–15	Liga MX	0	0	—		2	0	—		2	0
Pachuca	2015–16	Liga MX	5	0	10	0	—		—		15	0
Pachuca	2016–17	Liga MX	2	0	0	0	10	0	—		12	0
Pachuca	2017–18	Liga MX	22	0	8	0	—		1	0	31	0
Pachuca	2018–19	Liga MX	34	0	1	0	—		—		35	0
Pachuca	2019–20	Liga MX	5	0	5	0	—		—		10	0
Pachuca	Total		68	0	34	0	12	0	1	0	115	0
Atlético San Luis (loan)	2013–14	Ascenso MX	28	0	2	0	—		—		30	0
León	2020–21	Liga MX	7	0	—		0	0	—		7	0
León	2021–22	Liga MX	1	0	—		0	0	—		1	0
León	2022–23	Liga MX	0	0	—		0	0	0	0	0	0
León	2023–24	Liga MX	2	0	—		—		—		2	0
León	Total		10	0	–		0	0	—		10	0
Career total			169	0	36	0	25	0	1	0	231	0

== Honours ==
Pachuca

- CONCACAF Champions League: 2016–17

León

- Liga MX: Guardianes 2020
- CONCACAF Champions League: 2023

Individual

- CONCACAF Champions League Golden Glove: 2016–17
