= Iván Moreno (footballer, born 1998) =

Mexican footballer (born 1998)

Personal information
- Full name: Iván Jared Moreno Füguemann
- Date of birth: 17 January 1998 (age 28)
- Place of birth: Puebla, Mexico
- Height: 1.68 m (5 ft 6 in)
- Position: Right-back

Team information
- Current team: León
- Number: 7

Youth career
- 2016–2019: América

Senior career*
Years	Team	Apps	(Gls)
2018–2022	América	1	(0)
2018–2019	→ Zacatepec (loan)	6	(0)
2021–2022	→ Mazatlán (loan)	32	(2)
2022–2023	Puebla	17	(0)
2023	→ León (loan)	17	(1)
2023–	León	104	(6)
- * Club domestic league appearances and goals as of 21 November 2026

Iván Jared Moreno Füguemann (born 17 January 1998) is a Mexican professional footballer who plays as a right-back for Liga MX club León.

== Career statistics ==
=== Club ===
As of match played on 21 November 2026

Club	Season	League			Cup		Continental		Global		Other		Total	
Club	Season	Division	Apps	Goals	Apps	Goals	Apps	Goals	Apps	Goals	Apps	Goals	Apps	Goals
América	2018–19	Liga MX	1	0	3	0	—		—		—		4	0
Zacatepec (loan)	2019–20	Ascenso MX	6	0	3	0	—		—		—		9	0
Mazatlán (loan)	2020–21	Liga MX	3	0	2 (Note: Appearances in Copa GNP por México)	0	—		—		—		5	0
Mazatlán (loan)	2021–22	Liga MX	29	2	—		—		—		—		29	2
Mazatlán (loan)	Total		32	2	2	0	—		—		—		34	2
Puebla	2022–23	Liga MX	17	0	—		—		—		—		17	0
León (loan)	2022–23	Liga MX	17	1	—		6 (Note: Appearances in CONCACAF Champions League)	1	—		—		23	2
León	2023–24	Liga MX	30	1	—		—		1 (Note: Appearance in the FIFA Club World Cup)	0	3 (Note: Appearances in Leagues Cup)	2	34	3
León	2024–25	Liga MX	24	3	—		—		—		1	0	25	3
León	2025–26	Liga MX	33	1	—		—		—		3	0	36	1
León	2026–27	Liga MX	17	1	—		—		—		5	0	22	1
León	Total		104	6	—		—		—		13	2	117	8
Career total			177	9	8	0	6	1	1	0	13	2	205	12

== Honours ==
León

- CONCACAF Champions League: 2023

Individual

- CONCACAF Champions League Best XI: 2023
