= Óscar García (footballer, born 2003) =

Mexican footballer (born 2003)

Personal information
- Full name: Óscar Damián García Herrera
- Date of birth: 2 July 2003 (age 23)
- Place of birth: León, Guanajuato, Mexico
- Height: 1.86 m (6 ft 1 in)
- Position: Goalkeeper

Team information
- Current team: León
- Number: 23

Youth career
- 2018–2025: León

Senior career*
Years	Team	Apps	(Gls)
2025–	León	43	(0)

International career^{‡}
2026–	Mexico	1	(0)
- * Club domestic league appearances and goals as of 21 November 2026 ‡ National team caps and goals as of 29 September 2026

Óscar Damián García Herrera (born 2 July 2003), also known as Gato, is a Mexican professional footballer who plays as a goalkeeper for Liga MX club León and the Mexico national team.

== Club career ==
García began his career at the academy of León, progressing through all categories, until making his professional debut on 20 July 2025, in a 1–0 win against Guadalajara and on 26 October 2025, he stopped a penalty in a 1–1 draw with UNAM.

== International career ==
On 29 September 2026, García made his debut for the Mexico national team in a friendly against Peru.

== Career statistics ==
=== Club ===
As of match played on 21 November 2026

Appearances and goals by club, season and competition
Club	Season	League			Cup		Continental		Other		Total	
Club	Season	Division	Apps	Goals	Apps	Goals	Apps	Goals	Apps	Goals	Apps	Goals
León	2025–26	Liga MX	28	0	—		—		—		28	0
León	2026–27	Liga MX	15	0	—		—		6 (Note: Appearances in Leagues Cup)	0	21	0
Career total			43	0	0	0	0	0	6	0	49	0

=== International ===
As of match played on 29 September 2026

Appearances and goals by national team and year
National team	Year	Apps	Goals
Mexico	2026	1	0
Total		1	0
