= Walter López Castellanos =

Guatemalan referee (born 1980)

Walter López
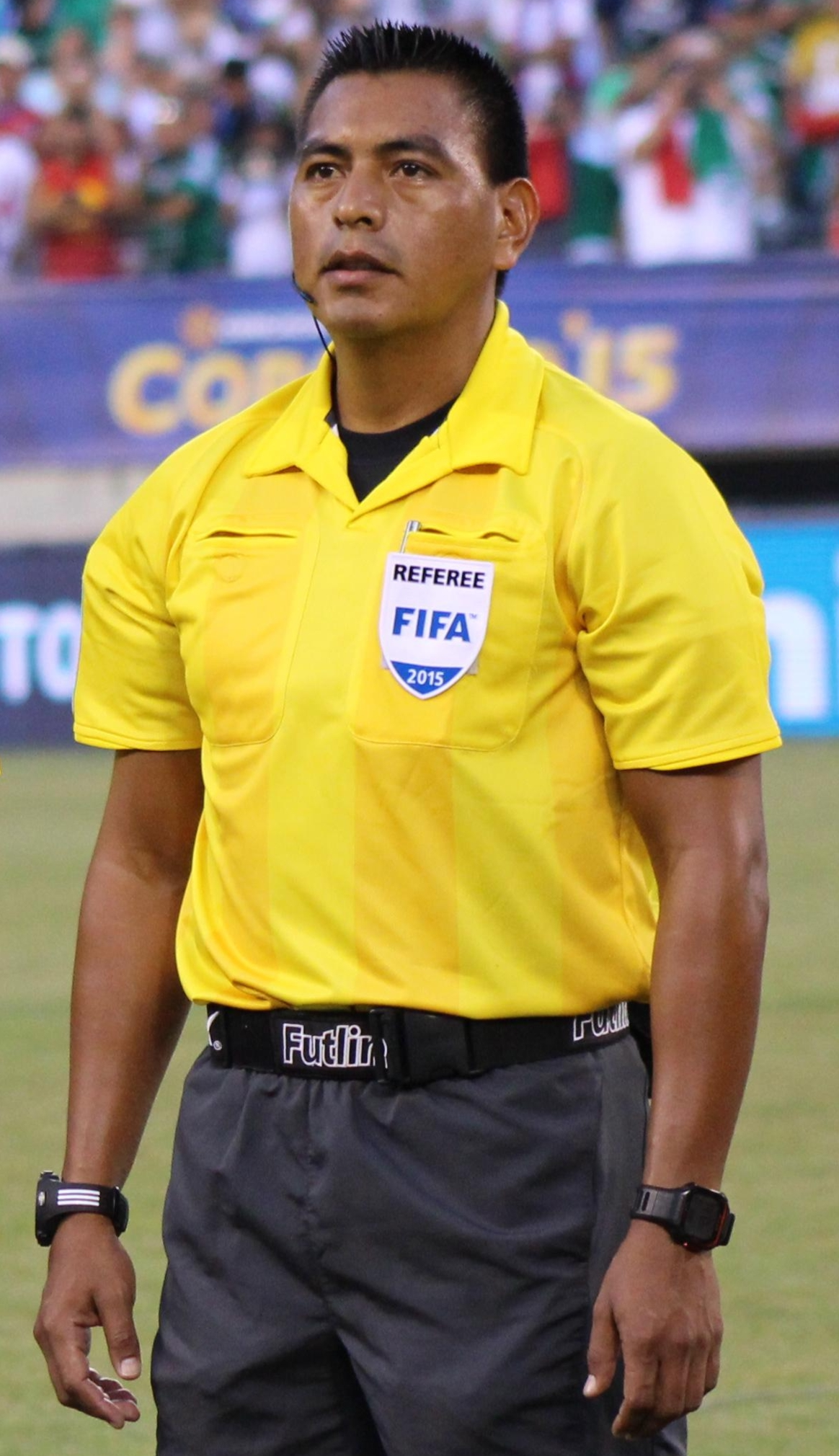
- López before a 2015 CONCACAF Gold Cup match at MetLife Stadium
- Full name: Walter Alexander López Castellanos
- Born: 25 September 1980 (age 46); Guatemala City, Guatemala

Domestic
Years	League	Role

International
Years	League	Role
2006–	FIFA listed	Referee

Walter Alexander López Castellanos (born 22 September 1980) is a Guatemalan football referee. He refereed at 2014 FIFA World Cup qualifiers and 2018 FIFA World Cup qualifiers.

== Career ==
López was appointed as a support referee for the 2014 FIFA World Cup in Brazil and served as a fourth official in four matches. He has been a FIFA-listed international referee since 2006.

At the 2014 FIFA Club World Cup, he officiated the final between Real Madrid and San Lorenzo de Almagro, which Real Madrid won 2–0. López gained widespread attention following a controversial refereeing decision on 10 October 2017 in the final group-stage match of the 2018 FIFA World Cup qualification (CONCACAF) between Panama and Costa Rica. In the 53rd minute, he awarded a goal to Panama even though the ball, touched by Blas Pérez, had gone wide of the goal. Panama ultimately won the match 2–1 and qualified for the 2018 FIFA World Cup by virtue of those three points.

López is the older brother of Bryan López (born 1988), who is also a FIFA referee.

Preceded by (Brazil) Sandro Ricci	FIFA Club World Cup final match referees 2014	Succeeded by (Iran) Alireza Faghani
