= 2023 CONCACAF Champions League =

15th edition of the CONCACAF Champions League

2023 Scotiabank CONCACAF Champions League
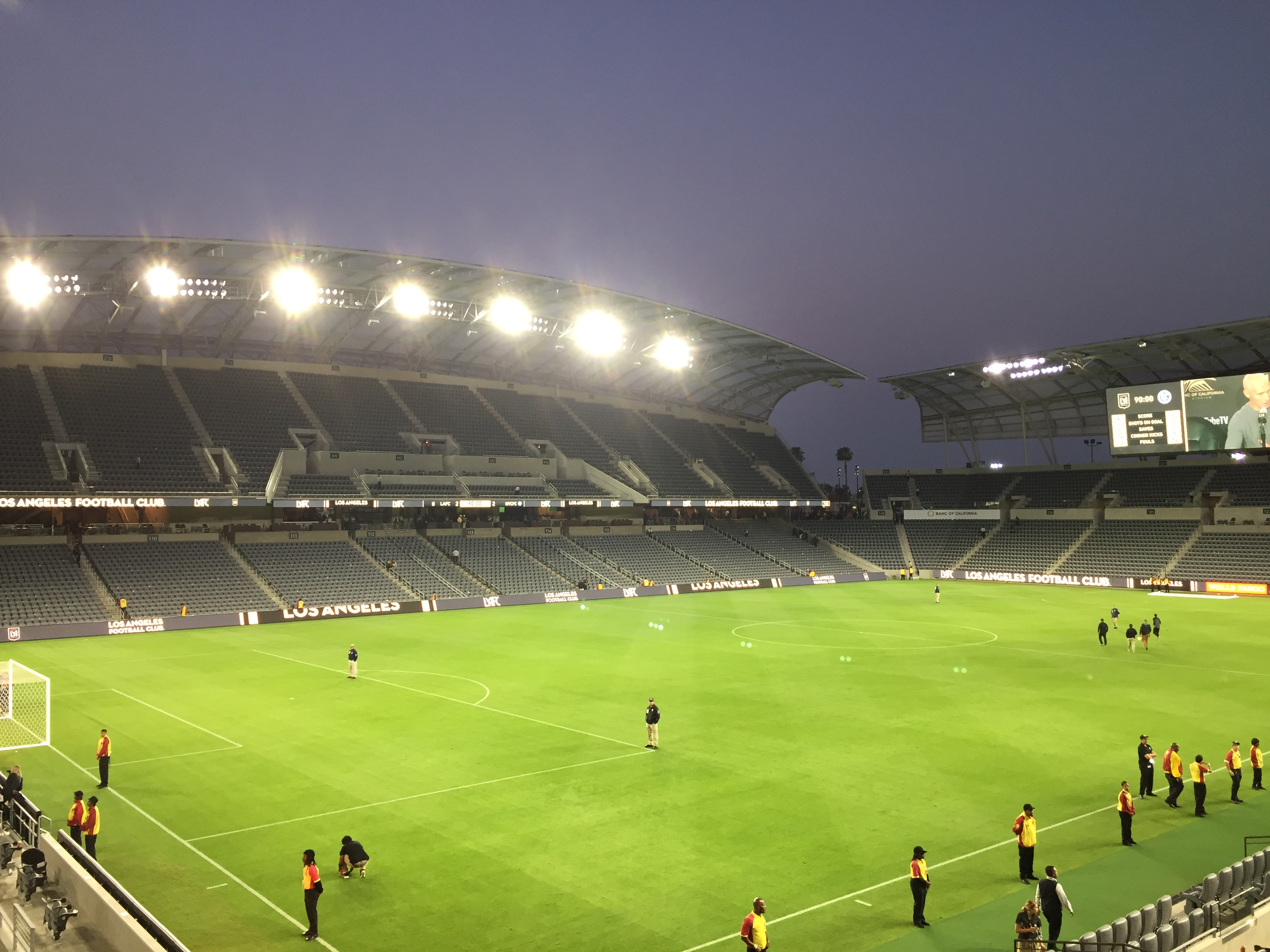
- BMO Stadium in Los Angeles hosted the second leg of the final

Tournament details
- Dates: 7 March – 4 June
- Teams: 16 (from 8 associations)

Final positions
- Champions: (Mexican Football Federation) León (1st title)
- Runners-up: (United States Soccer Federation) Los Angeles FC

Tournament statistics
- Matches played: 30
- Goals scored: 82 (2.73 per match)
- Top scorer(s): (Gabon) Denis Bouanga (Los Angeles FC); 7 goals
- Best player: (Chile) Víctor Dávila (León)
- Best young player: (Mexico) Fidel Ambríz (León)
- Fair play award: (United States Soccer Federation) Los Angeles FC

The 2023 CONCACAF Champions League (officially the 2023 Scotiabank CONCACAF Champions League for sponsorship reasons) was the 15th and final edition of the CONCACAF Champions League under its former name, and overall the 58th edition of the premier football club competition organized by CONCACAF, the regional governing body of North America, Central America, and the Caribbean.

Seattle Sounders FC were the title holders, but they did not qualify for this tournament and were unable to defend their title.

León won their first title, defeating Los Angeles FC of MLS in the final 3–1 on aggregate. As winners, they earned the right to play in the 2023 FIFA Club World Cup in Saudi Arabia and would have also qualified 2025 FIFA Club World Cup in the United States alongside the winners from 2021 to 2024. However, due to León sharing the same ownership as C.F. Pachuca, another qualified team, and regulations against multi-club ownership, León was later disqualified from the latter; their spot in the Club World Cup was instead awarded to Los Angeles FC, the runners-up to León in the 2023 CONCACAF Champions League, who beaten Club América, the top-ranked team in the CONCACAF confederation ranking at the conclusion of the 2024 CONCACAF Champions Cup in the play-in match on 31 May 2025.

== Teams ==
The following 16 teams (from eight associations) qualified for the tournament.

- North American Zone: 9 teams (from three associations)
- Central American Zone: 6 teams (from four associations), all of them qualified through the 2022 CONCACAF League
- Caribbean Zone: 1 team (from one association), qualified through the 2022 Caribbean Club Championship

In the following table, the number of appearances, last appearance, and previous best result count only those in the CONCACAF Champions League era starting from 2008–09 (not counting those in the era of the Champions' Cup from 1962 to 2008).

Direct entrants (10 teams)
Association	Team	Qualifying method	App. (last)	Previous best (last)
Mexico (4 berths)	Atlas	Apertura 2021 champions and Clausura 2022 champions	1st	Debut
Mexico (4 berths)	León	Apertura 2021 runners-up	5th (2022)	Quarter-finals (2022)
Mexico (4 berths)	Pachuca	Clausura 2022 runners-up	4th (2016–17)	Champions (2016–17)
Mexico (4 berths)	Tigres UANL	Best ranked team on aggregate table that have not already qualified	7th (2020)	Champions (2020)
United States (4 berths)	Los Angeles FC	2022 MLS Cup champions and 2022 MLS Supporters' Shield champions	2nd (2020)	Runners-up (2020)
United States (4 berths)	Philadelphia Union	2022 Eastern Conference regular season champions	2nd (2021)	Semi-finals (2021)
United States (4 berths)	Orlando City SC	2022 U.S. Open Cup champions	1st	Debut
United States (4 berths)	Austin FC	Highest-ranked U.S. based Division I club (based on 2022 MLS regular season record) not already qualified	1st	Debut
Canada (1 berth)	Vancouver Whitecaps FC	2022 Canadian Championship champions	3rd (2016–17)	Semi-finals (2016–17)
Haiti (CFU berth)	Violette	2022 CONCACAF Caribbean Club Championship champions	1st	Debut

Qualified teams from CONCACAF League (6 teams)
Association	Team	Qualifying method	App. (last)	Previous best (last)
Honduras	Olimpia	2022 CONCACAF League champions (1st overall)	13th (2021)	Semi-finals (2020)
Honduras	Real España	2022 CONCACAF League semifinalist (3rd overall)	4th (2014–15)	Group stage (2011–12)
Honduras	Motagua	2022 CONCACAF League semifinalist (4th overall)	7th (2022)	Round of 16 (2020)
Costa Rica	Alajuelense	2022 CONCACAF League runners-up (2nd overall)	7th (2021)	Semi-finals (2014–15)
El Salvador	Alianza	2022 CONCACAF League best-ranked losing quarter-finalist (5th overall)	5th (2020)	Round of 16 (2019)
Panama	Tauro	2022 CONCACAF League second-ranked losing quarter-finalist (6th overall)	7th (2018)	Quarter-finals (2018)

== Draw ==
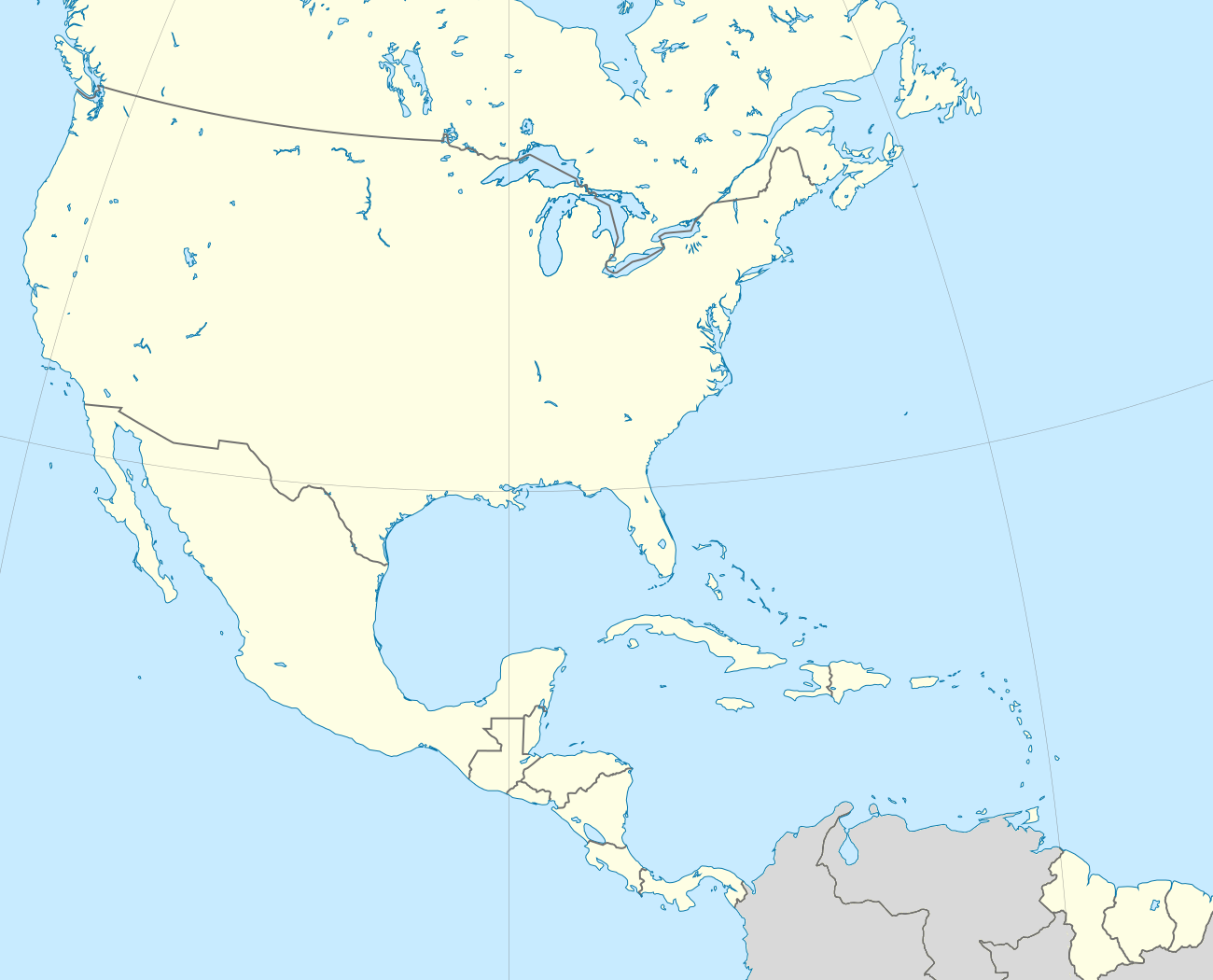
Location of teams of the 2023 CONCACAF Champions League
North American Zone Central American Zone Caribbean Zone

The draw took take place in Miami, Florida, United States on 7 November 2022. The seeding of teams was based on the CONCACAF Club Index. The CONCACAF Club Index, instead of ranking each team, was based on the on-field performance of the teams that occupied the respective qualifying slots in the previous five editions of the CONCACAF Champions League. To determine the total points awarded to a slot in any single edition of the CONCACAF Champions League, CONCACAF used the following formula:

Points per	Participation	Win	Draw	Stage advanced	Champions
Points per	4	3	1	1	2

The slots were assigned by the following rules:

- For teams from North America, nine teams qualified based on criteria set by their association (e.g., tournament champions, runners-up, cup champions), resulting in an assigned slot (e.g., MEX1, MEX2) for each team. If a team from Canada qualified through the CONCACAF League, they were ranked within their association, resulting in an assigned slot (i.e., CAN2) for them.
- For teams from Central America, they qualified through the CONCACAF League, and were ranked per association by their CONCACAF League ranking, resulting in an assigned slot (e.g., CRC1, CRC2) for each team.
- For teams from the Caribbean, the CONCACAF Caribbean Club Championship champions were assigned the Caribbean champion slot (i.e., CCC1). If teams from the Caribbean qualified through the CONCACAF League, they were ranked per association by their CONCACAF League ranking, resulting in an assigned slot (e.g., JAM1, SUR1) for each team.

The 16 teams were distributed in the pots as follows:

Pot	Rank	Slot	2018	2019	2020	2021	2022	Total	Team
Pot 1	1	MEX2	25	21	24	16	17	103	(Mexican Football Federation) León
Pot 1	2	MEX3	17	26	11	20	19	93	(Mexican Football Federation) Pachuca
Pot 1	3	MEX1	12	20	11	28	12	83	(Mexican Football Federation) Atlas
Pot 1	4	USA4	5	11	12	12	25	65	(United States Soccer Federation) Austin FC
Pot 1	5	USA2	7	15	16	16	8	62	(United States Soccer Federation) Philadelphia Union
Pot 1	6	USA1	11	11	6	12	16	56	(United States Soccer Federation) Los Angeles FC
Pot 1	7	USA3	17	11	11	10	7	56	(United States Soccer Federation) Orlando City SC
Pot 1	8	CAN1	21	5	10	9	9	54	(Canadian Soccer Association) Vancouver Whitecaps FC
Pot 2	9	MEX4	9	4	7	5	7	32	(Mexican Football Federation) Tigres UANL
Pot 2	10	CRC1	5	7	6	4	5	27	(Costa Rican Football Federation) Alajuelense
Pot 2	11	HON1	5	4	5	7	5	26	(National Autonomous Federation of Football of Honduras) Olimpia
Pot 2	12	HON2	5	0	11	5	0	21	(National Autonomous Federation of Football of Honduras) Real España
Pot 2	13	PAN1	8	12	0	0	0	20	(Panamanian Football Federation) Tauro
Pot 2	14	SLV1	7	5	7	0	0	19	(Salvadoran Football Federation) Alianza
Pot 2	15	CCC1	4	4	4	4	0	16	(Haitian Football Federation) Violette
Pot 2	16	HON3	0	0	0	0	0	0	(National Autonomous Federation of Football of Honduras) Motagua

== Format ==
Each tie, including the final, was played over two legs, with each team playing on a home-and-away basis.

- In the round of 16, quarter-finals, and semi-finals, the away goals rule was applied if the aggregate score was tied after the second leg. If still tied, a penalty shoot-out was used to determine the winner (Regulations Article 12.7).
- In the final, extra time was played if the match was tied after regulation time. If the score was still tied after extra time, a penalty shoot-out was used to determine the winner (Regulations Article 12.8).

== Schedule ==
Schedule for 2023 CONCACAF Champions League
Round	First leg	Second leg
Round of 16	7–9 March	14–16 March
Quarter-finals	4–5 April	11–13 April
Semi-finals	25–26 April	2–3 May
Final	31 May	4 June

== Bracket ==
Round of 16
(National Autonomous Federation of Football of Honduras) Motagua (a)	0	1	1
(Mexican Football Federation) Pachuca	0	1	1
(Mexican Football Federation) Tigres UANL (a)	0	1	1
(United States Soccer Federation) Orlando City SC	0	1	1
(Panamanian Football Federation) Tauro	0	0	0
(Mexican Football Federation) León	1	2	3
(Haitian Football Federation) Violette	3	0	3
(United States Soccer Federation) Austin FC	0	2	2
(Salvadoran Football Federation) Alianza	0	0	0
(United States Soccer Federation) Philadelphia Union	0	4	4
(National Autonomous Federation of Football of Honduras) Olimpia	4	0	4
(Mexican Football Federation) Atlas	1	4	5
(Canadian Soccer Association) Vancouver Whitecaps FC	5	2	7
(National Autonomous Federation of Football of Honduras) Real España	0	3	3
(Costa Rican Football Federation) Alajuelense	0	2	2
(United States Soccer Federation) Los Angeles FC	3	1	4

Quarter-finals
(National Autonomous Federation of Football of Honduras) Motagua	0	0	0
(Mexican Football Federation) Tigres UANL	1	5	6
(Mexican Football Federation) León	5	1	6
(Haitian Football Federation) Violette	0	2	2
(United States Soccer Federation) Philadelphia Union	1	2	3
(Mexican Football Federation) Atlas	0	2	2
(Canadian Soccer Association) Vancouver Whitecaps FC	0	0	0
(United States Soccer Federation) Los Angeles FC	3	3	6

Semi-finals
(Mexican Football Federation) Tigres UANL	2	1	3
(Mexican Football Federation) León	1	3	4
(United States Soccer Federation) Philadelphia Union	1	0	1
(United States Soccer Federation) Los Angeles FC	1	3	4

Final
(Mexican Football Federation) León	2	1	3
(United States Soccer Federation) Los Angeles FC	1	0	1

== Round of 16 ==
In the round of 16, the matchups were decided by draw: R16-1 through R16-8. The teams from Pot 1 in the draw hosted the second leg.

=== Summary ===
The first legs were played on 7–9 March, and the second legs were played on 14–16 March 2023.

Team 1	Agg.	Team 2	1st leg	2nd leg
Violette (Haiti)	3–2	(United States) Austin FC	3–0	0–2
Tauro (Panama)	0–3	(Mexico) León	0–1	0–2
Tigres UANL (Mexico)	1–1 (a)	(United States) Orlando City SC	0–0	1–1
Motagua (Honduras)	1–1 (a)	(Mexico) Pachuca	0–0	1–1
Vancouver Whitecaps FC (Canada)	7–3 (Note: Order of legs were reversed after original draw)	(Honduras) Real España	5–0	2–3
Alajuelense (Costa Rica)	2–4	(United States) Los Angeles FC	0–3	2–1
Olimpia (Honduras)	4–5	(Mexico) Atlas	4–1	0–4
Alianza (El Salvador)	0–4	(United States) Philadelphia Union	0–0	0–4

=== Matches ===
7 March 2023
18:00 (19:00 UTC−04:00)

Violette (Haitian Football Federation)	3–0	(United States Soccer Federation) Austin FC
Chéry 13', 39'; Tarek 47' (o.g.)	Report

Estadio Cibao FC, Santiago (Dominican Republic) (Note: Due to the 2018–2023 Haitian crisis, Violette played their home matches at Estadio Cibao FC in Santiago, Dominican Republic.)
Referee: Selvin Brown (Honduras)
14 March 2023
20:00 (19:00 CDT)

Austin FC	2–0	Violette
Driussi 51', 63'	Report

Q2 Stadium, Austin
Attendance: 20,738
Referee: Oshane Nation (Jamaica)

Violette won 3–2 on aggregate.

8 March 2023
18:00

Tauro (Panamanian Football Federation)	0–1	(Mexican Football Federation) León
	Report	Moreno 55'

Estadio Rommel Fernández, Panama City
Referee: Armando Villarreal (United States)
16 March 2023
20:00 (18:00 CST)

León	2–0	Tauro
Rubio 26'; E. Hernández 45+2'	Report

Estadio León, León
Referee: Walter López (Guatemala)

León won 3–0 on aggregate.

7 March 2023
22:00 (21:00 UTC−06:00)

Tigres UANL (Mexican Football Federation)	0–0	(United States Soccer Federation) Orlando City SC
	Report

Estadio Universitario, San Nicolás de los Garza
Referee: Mario Escobar (Guatemala)
15 March 2023
20:15

Orlando City SC	1–1	Tigres UANL
Kara 89'	Report	Córdova 21'

Exploria Stadium, Orlando
Attendance: 21,112
Referee: Saíd Martínez (Honduras)

1–1 on aggregate. Tigres UANL won on away goals.

9 March 2023
20:00 (19:00 UTC−06:00)

Motagua (National Autonomous Federation of Football of Honduras)	0–0	(Mexican Football Federation) Pachuca
	Report

Estadio Olímpico Metropolitano, San Pedro Sula
Referee: Drew Fischer (Canada)
16 March 2023
22:15 (20:15 CST)

Pachuca	1–1	Motagua
I. Hernández 73'	Report	Hernández 89' (pen.)

Estadio Hidalgo, Pachuca
Referee: Iván Barton (El Salvador)

1–1 on aggregate. Motagua won on away goals.

8 March 2023
22:00 (19:00 UTC−08:00)

Vancouver Whitecaps FC (Canadian Soccer Association)	5–0	(National Autonomous Federation of Football of Honduras) Real España
Blackmon 21'; Raposo 59'; D. García 64' (o.g.); Vite 70'; White 78'	Report

BC Place, Vancouver
Attendance: 13,644
Referee: Fernando Hernández (Mexico)
15 March 2023
18:00 (16:00 UTC−06:00)

Real España	3–2	Vancouver Whitecaps FC
Montes 67', 86'; Rocca 75'	Report	White 66'; Becher 83'

Estadio Olímpico Metropolitano, San Pedro Sula
Referee: Marco Ortíz (Mexico)

Vancouver Whitecaps FC won 7–3 on aggregate.

9 March 2023
22:00 (21:00 UTC−06:00)

Alajuelense (Costa Rican Football Federation)	0–3	(United States Soccer Federation) Los Angeles FC
	Report	Bouanga 47', 69', 89'

Estadio Alejandro Morera Soto, Alajuela
Referee: Daneon Parchment (Jamaica)
15 March 2023
22:30 (19:30 PDT)

Los Angeles FC	1–2	Alajuelense
Vela 83'	Report	González 8' (pen.); Suárez 52'

BMO Stadium, Los Angeles
Attendance: 19,672
Referee: Adonai Escobedo (Mexico)

Los Angeles FC won 4–2 on aggregate.

8 March 2023
20:00 (19:00 UTC−06:00)

Olimpia (National Autonomous Federation of Football of Honduras)	4–1	(Mexican Football Federation) Atlas
López 10'; Benguché 55', 73'; Bengtson 61' (pen.)	Report	Furch 15' (pen.)

Estadio Olímpico Metropolitano, San Pedro Sula
Referee: Ismail Elfath (United States)
14 March 2023
22:15 (20:15 CST)

Atlas	4–0	Olimpia
Quiñones 38', 90+2'; Herrera 63'; Rocha 78'	Report

Estadio Jalisco, Guadalajara
Attendance: 13,697
Referee: Juan Gabriel Calderón (Costa Rica)

Atlas won 5–4 on aggregate.

7 March 2023
20:00 (19:00 UTC−06:00)

Alianza (Salvadoran Football Federation)	0–0	(United States Soccer Federation) Philadelphia Union
	Report

Estadio Cuscatlán, San Salvador
Referee: César Ramos (Mexico)
14 March 2023
20:00

Philadelphia Union	4–0	Alianza
Lowe 45+1'; Gazdag 62' (pen.); Perea 81', 84'	Report

Subaru Park, Chester
Attendance: 8,145
Referee: Bryan López (Guatemala)

Philadelphia Union won 4–0 on aggregate.

== Quarter-finals ==
In the quarter-finals, the matchups were determined as follows:

- QF1: Winner R16-1 vs. Winner R16-2
- QF2: Winner R16-3 vs. Winner R16-4
- QF3: Winner R16-5 vs. Winner R16-6
- QF4: Winner R16-7 vs. Winner R16-8

The winners of round of 16 matchups 1, 3, 5 and 7 hosted the second leg.

=== Summary ===
The first legs were played on 4–5 April, and the second legs were played on 11–12 April 2023.

Team 1	Agg.	Team 2	1st leg	2nd leg
Violette (Haiti)	2–6	(Mexico) León	0–5	2–1
Motagua (Honduras)	0–6	(Mexico) Tigres UANL	0–1	0–5
Vancouver Whitecaps FC (Canada)	0–6	(United States) Los Angeles FC	0–3	0–3
Atlas (Mexico)	2–3	(United States) Philadelphia Union	0–1	2–2

=== Matches ===
4 April 2023
22:00 (20:00 CDT)

León	5–0	Violette
Mena 8'; Dávila 66', 84'; Di Yorio 90+1'; E. Hernández 90+4'	Report

Estadio León, León
Referee: Ismael Cornejo (El Salvador)
11 April 2023
20:00

Violette (Haitian Football Federation)	2–1	(Mexican Football Federation) León
Chéry 15', 26'	Report	Rubio 30' (pen.)

Estadio Cibao FC, Santiago (Dominican Republic)
Referee: Keylor Herrera (Costa Rica)

León won 6–2 on aggregate.

5 April 2023
20:00 (18:00 UTC−06:00)

Motagua (National Autonomous Federation of Football of Honduras)	0–1	(Mexican Football Federation) Tigres UANL
	Report	Quiñones 44'

Estadio Olímpico Metropolitano, San Pedro Sula
Referee: Armando Villarreal (United States)
13 April 2023
22:00 (20:00 CDT)

Tigres UANL	5–0	Motagua
Gignac 27', 66'; Quiñones 83'; Angulo 88'; Ibáñez 90'	Report

Estadio Universitario, San Nicolás de los Garza
Referee: Walter López (Guatemala)

Tigres UANL won 6–0 on aggregate.

5 April 2023
22:00 (19:00 PDT)

Vancouver Whitecaps FC (Canadian Soccer Association)	0–3	(United States Soccer Federation) Los Angeles FC
	Report	Bouanga 56', 65'; Opoku 61'

BC Place, Vancouver
Attendance: 11,652
Referee: Fernando Guerrero (Mexico)
11 April 2023
22:15 (19:15 PDT)

Los Angeles FC	3–0	Vancouver Whitecaps FC
Vela 8' (pen.), 31'; Cifuentes 65'	Report

BMO Stadium, Los Angeles
Attendance: 18,688
Referee: Juan Calderón (Costa Rica)

Los Angeles FC won 6–0 on aggregate.

4 April 2023
20:00

Philadelphia Union	1–0	Atlas
Gazdag 89' (pen.)	Report

Subaru Park, Chester
Referee: Saíd Martínez (Honduras)
12 April 2023
22:00 (20:00 CDT)

Atlas (Mexican Football Federation)	2–2	(United States Soccer Federation) Philadelphia Union
Quiñones 11'; Furch 45+1'	Report	Carranza 27', 78'

Estadio Jalisco, Guadalajara
Referee: Iván Barton (El Salvador)

Philadelphia Union won 3–2 on aggregate.

== Semi-finals ==
In the semi-finals, the matchups were determined as follows:

- SF1: Winner QF1 vs. Winner QF2
- SF2: Winner QF3 vs. Winner QF4

The semi-finalists in each tie which had the better performance across all previous rounds hosted the second leg.

Pos	Team	Pld	W	D	L	GF	GA	GD	Pts	Host
1 (SF1)	(Mexican Football Federation) León	4	3	0	1	9	2	+7	9	Second leg
2 (SF1)	(Mexican Football Federation) Tigres UANL	4	2	2	0	7	1	+6	8	First leg
1 (SF2)	(United States Soccer Federation) Los Angeles FC	4	3	0	1	10	2	+8	9	Second leg
2 (SF2)	(United States Soccer Federation) Philadelphia Union	4	2	2	0	7	2	+5	8	First leg

Source: CONCACAF
Rules for classification: 1) Points; 2) Goal difference; 3) Goals scored; 4) Away goals scored; 5) Wins; 6) Away wins; 7) Disciplinary points (1 point for yellow card, 3 points for indirect red card, 4 points for direct red card, 5 points for yellow card and direct red card); 8) Drawing of lots (Regulations Article 12.9.5).

=== Summary ===
The first legs were played on 25–26 April, and the second legs were played on 2–3 May 2023.

Team 1	Agg.	Team 2	1st leg	2nd leg
Tigres UANL (Mexico)	3–4	(Mexico) León	2–1	1–3
Philadelphia Union (United States)	1–4	(United States) Los Angeles FC	1–1	0–3

=== Matches ===
25 April 2023
22:00 (20:00 CDT)

Tigres UANL (Mexican Football Federation)	2–1	(Mexican Football Federation) León
Córdova 45'; Quiñones 45+3'	Report	Dávila 6'

Estadio Universitario, San Nicolás de los Garza
Referee: Armando Villarreal (United States)
3 May 2023
22:00 (20:00 CDT)

León (Mexican Football Federation)	3–1	(Mexican Football Federation) Tigres UANL
Ambríz 10'; Mena 15'; Frías 79'	Report	Fulgencio 68'

Estadio León, León
Referee: Saíd Martínez (Honduras)

León won 4–3 on aggregate.

26 April 2023
21:00

Philadelphia Union	1–1	(United States Soccer Federation) Los Angeles FC
Gazdag 86' (pen.)	Report	Acosta 90+1'

Subaru Park, Chester
Attendance: 17,676
Referee: César Ramos (Mexico)
2 May 2023
22:00 (19:00 PDT)

Los Angeles FC (United States Soccer Federation)	3–0	(United States Soccer Federation) Philadelphia Union
Tillman 13'; Opoku 82'; Bouanga 90'	Report

BMO Stadium, Los Angeles
Attendance: 19,985
Referee: Drew Fischer (Canada)

Los Angeles FC won 4–1 on aggregate.

== Final ==
In the final (Winner SF1 vs. Winner SF2), the finalist which had the better performances in previous rounds hosted the second leg.

Pos	Team	Pld	W	D	L	GF	GA	GD	Pts	Host
1	(United States Soccer Federation) Los Angeles FC	6	4	1	1	14	3	+11	13	Second leg
2	(Mexican Football Federation) Club León	6	4	0	2	13	5	+8	12	First leg

Source: CONCACAF
Rules for classification: 1) Points; 2) Goal difference; 3) Goals scored; 4) Away goals scored; 5) Wins; 6) Away wins; 7) Disciplinary points (1 point for yellow card, 3 points for indirect red card, 4 points for direct red card, 5 points for yellow card and direct red card); 8) Drawing of lots (Regulations Article 12.9.5).

=== Summary ===
The first leg was played on 31 May, and the second leg was played on 4 June 2023.

Team 1	Agg.	Team 2	1st leg	2nd leg
León (Mexico)	3–1	(United States) Los Angeles FC	2–1	1–0

31 May 2023
22:00 (20:00 UTC−6)

León (Mexico)	2–1	(United States) Los Angeles FC
Tesillo 8'; Mena 45+5' (pen.)	Report	Bouanga 90+6'

Estadio León, León
Attendance: 20,517
Referee: Walter López (Guatemala)

4 June 2023
21:00 (18:00 UTC−7)

Los Angeles FC (United States)	0–1	(Mexico) León
	Report	Di Yorio 20'

BMO Stadium, Los Angeles
Attendance: 22,413
Referee: Iván Barton (El Salvador)

León won 3–1 on aggregate.

== Statistics ==
=== Top goalscorers ===
Team eliminated for this round.

Rank	Player	Club	By round								Total goals
Rank	Player	Club	1R1	1R2	QF1	QF2	SF1	SF2	F1	F2	Total goals
1	(Gabon) Denis Bouanga	(United States Soccer Federation) Los Angeles FC	3		2			1	1		7
2	(Haiti) Miche-Naider Chéry	(Haitian Football Federation) Violette	2			2					4
3	(Chile) Víctor Dávila	(Mexican Football Federation) León			2		1				3
3	(Hungary) Dániel Gazdag	(United States Soccer Federation) Philadelphia Union		1	1		1				3
3	(Ecuador) Ángel Mena	(Mexican Football Federation) León			1			1	1		3
3	(Colombia) Julián Quiñones	(Mexican Football Federation) Atlas		2		1					3
3	(Colombia) Luis Quiñones	(Mexican Football Federation) Tigres UANL			1	1	1				3
3	(Mexico) Carlos Vela	(United States Soccer Federation) Los Angeles FC		1		2					3
9	(Honduras) Jorge Benguché	(National Autonomous Federation of Football of Honduras) Olimpia	2								2
9	(Argentina) Julián Carranza	(United States Soccer Federation) Philadelphia Union				2					2
9	(Mexico) Sebastián Córdova	(Mexican Football Federation) Tigres UANL		1			1				2
9	(Argentina) Sebastián Driussi	(United States Soccer Federation) Austin FC		2							2
9	(France) André-Pierre Gignac	(Mexican Football Federation) Tigres UANL				2					2
9	(Mexico) Elias Hernández	(Mexican Football Federation) León		1	1						2
9	(Honduras) Getsal Montes	(National Autonomous Federation of Football of Honduras) Real España		2							2
9	(United States) Andrés Perea	(United States Soccer Federation) Philadelphia Union		2							2
9	(Mexico) Brian Rubio	(Mexican Football Federation) León		1		1					2
9	(United States) Brian White	(Canadian Soccer Association) Vancouver Whitecaps FC	1	1							2

=== Team of the Season ===
CONCACAF selected the following players as the team of the tournament.

Pos.	Player	Team
GK	(United States) John McCarthy	(United States Soccer Federation) Los Angeles FC
DF	(Ecuador) Diego Palacios	(United States Soccer Federation) Los Angeles FC
DF	(United States) Aaron Long	(United States Soccer Federation) Los Angeles FC
DF	(Argentina) Adonis Frías	(Mexican Football Federation) León
DF	(Mexico) Iván Moreno	(Mexican Football Federation) León
MF	(Mexico) Fidel Ambríz	(Mexican Football Federation) León
MF	(Colombia) Luis Quiñones	(Mexican Football Federation) Tigres UANL
MF	(Mexico) Elías Hernández	(Mexican Football Federation) León
FW	(Chile) Víctor Dávila	(Mexican Football Federation) León
FW	(Gabon) Denis Bouanga	(United States Soccer Federation) Los Angeles FC
FW	(Mexico) Carlos Vela	(United States Soccer Federation) Los Angeles FC

=== Awards ===
Award	Player	Team	Ref.
Best Player Award	(Chile) Víctor Dávila	(Mexican Football Federation) León	
Best Goalkeeper Award	(United States) John McCarthy	(United States Soccer Federation) Los Angeles FC	
Young Player Award	(Mexico) Fidel Ambríz	(Mexican Football Federation) León	
Top Scorer Award	(Gabon) Denis Bouanga	(United States Soccer Federation) Los Angeles FC	
Fair Play Award	—N/a	(United States Soccer Federation) Los Angeles FC	

== See also ==
- 2022 CONCACAF League
