= Clausura 2018 Liga MX final phase =

Clausura 2018 Final phase
Tournament details
- Country: Mexico
- Dates: 2 May–20 May 2018
- Teams: 8

Final positions
- Champions: Santos Laguna (6th title)
- Runners-up: Toluca

Tournament statistics
- Matches played: 14
- Goals scored: 47 (3.36 per match)
- Attendance: 441,078 (31,506 per match)

The Clausura 2018 Liga MX championship stage commonly known as Liguilla (playoffs) was played from 2 May 2018 to 20 May 2018. A total of eight teams competed in the championship stage to decide the champions of the Clausura 2018 Liga MX season. Both finalists qualified to the 2019 CONCACAF Champions League.

== Qualified teams ==
Pos	Team	Pld	W	D	L	GF	GA	GD	Pts	Qualification or relegation
1	Toluca	17	11	3	3	24	13	+11	36	Advance to Liguilla
2	América	17	7	8	2	24	14	+10	29	Advance to Liguilla
3	Monterrey	17	8	5	4	30	21	+9	29	Advance to Liguilla
4	Santos Laguna	17	9	2	6	29	20	+9	29	Advance to Liguilla
5	UANL	17	7	7	3	23	16	+7	28	Advance to Liguilla
6	Tijuana	17	6	7	4	18	12	+6	25	Advance to Liguilla
7	UNAM	17	6	6	5	24	24	0	24	Advance to Liguilla
8	Morelia	17	7	3	7	22	24	−2	24	Advance to Liguilla

Source: Liga MX
Rules for classification: 1) Points; 2) Goal difference; 3) Number of goals scored; 4) Head-to-head results between tied teams; 5) Number of goals scored away; 6) Highest relegation coefficient; 7) Fair Play points

== Format ==
- Teams are re-seeded each round.
- Team with more goals on aggregate after two matches advances.
- Away goals rule is applied in the quarterfinals and semifinals, but not the final.
- In the quarterfinals and semifinals, if the two teams are tied on aggregate and away goals, the higher seeded team advances.
- In the final, if the two teams are tied after both legs, the match goes to extra time and, if necessary, a shoot-out.
- Both finalists qualify to the 2019 CONCACAF Champions League (in Pot 3).

=== Bracket ===
Quarterfinals
1	Toluca (s)	2	2	4
8	Morelia	2	2	4
3	Monterrey	1	1	2
6	Tijuana	1	2	3
2	América	4	2	6
7	UNAM	1	1	2
4	Santos Laguna (s)	0	2	2
5	UANL	2	0	2

Semifinals
1	Toluca	1	4	5
6	Tijuana	2	1	3
2	América	1	2	3
4	Santos Laguna	4	2	6

Finals
1	Toluca	1	1	2
4	Santos Laguna	2	1	3

== Quarterfinals ==
Team 1	Agg.	Team 2	1st leg	2nd leg
Morelia	4–4	Toluca (s)	2–2	2–2
UNAM	2–6	América	1–4	1–2
Tijuana	3–2	Monterrey	1–1	2–1
UANL	2–2	Santos Laguna (s)	2–0	0–2

All times are UTC−5 except for the match in Tijuana (UTC−7)

=== First leg ===
2 May 2018
19:30

UNAM	1–4	América
N. Castillo 41' (pen.)	Report	Uribe 1', 38'; Ménez 30' (pen.), 61' (pen.)

Estadio Olímpico Universitario, Mexico City
Attendance: 34,350
Referee: Luis Enrique Santander (Guanajuato)

2 May 2018
19:30

Tijuana	1–1	Monterrey
Rivero 53'	Report	Pabón 39'

Estadio Caliente, Tijuana
Attendance: 25,333
Referee: Adonai Escobedo (Aguascalientes)

3 May 2018
19:30

UANL	2–0	Santos Laguna
Ayala 22'; Gignac 79' (pen.)	Report

Estadio Universitario, San Nicolás de los Garza
Attendance: 40,094
Referee: Diego Montaño (Jalisco)

3 May 2018
21:30

Morelia	2–2	Toluca
Osuna 56'; Loeschbor 63'	Report	Barrientos 15'; Uribe 79'

Estadio Morelos, Morelia
Attendance: 19,083
Referee: Jorge Antonio Pérez (Veracruz)

=== Second leg ===
5 May 2018
19:00

América	2–1	UNAM
Uribe 4'; Ibargüen 80'	Report	Gallardo 44'

Estadio Azteca, Mexico City
Attendance: 41,598
Referee: Marco Antonio Ortiz (Durango)

América won 6–2 on aggregate

5 May 2018
21:00

Monterrey	1–2	Tijuana
Pabón 47'	Report	Bolaños 5'; Lucero 23'

Estadio BBVA Bancomer, Guadalupe
Attendance: 33,790
Referee: Fernando Guerrero (Mexico City)

Tijuana won 3–2 on aggregate

6 May 2018
12:00

Toluca	2–2	Morelia
Borja 2'; Sambueza 86'	Report	Loeschbor 90+2'; Sansores 90+3'

Estadio Nemesio Díez, Toluca
Attendance: 23,045
Referee: César Arturo Ramos (Sinaloa)

4–4 on aggregate and tied on away goals. Toluca advanced for being the higher seed in the classification table.

6 May 2018
18:00

Santos Laguna	2–0	UANL
Martínez 17'; Djaniny 73'	Report

Estadio Corona, Torreón
Attendance: 26,442
Referee: Jorge Isaac Rojas (Mexico City)

2–2 on aggregate and tied on away goals. Santos Laguna advanced for being the higher seed in the classification table.

== Semifinals ==
Team 1	Agg.	Team 2	1st leg	2nd leg
Tijuana	3–5	Toluca	2–1	1–4
Santos Laguna	6–3	América	4–1	2–2

All times are UTC−5 except for the match in Tijuana (UTC−7)

=== First leg ===
10 May 2018
19:30

Santos Laguna	4–1	América
Martínez 15'; Furch 38', 54'; Cetré 79'	Report	Domínguez 32'

Estadio Corona, Torreón
Attendance: 29,097
Referee: César Arturo Ramos (Sinaloa)

10 May 2018
19:30

Tijuana	2–1	Toluca
Lucero 27', 50'	Report	Uribe 90+4'

Estadio Caliente, Tijuana
Attendance: 27,333
Referee: Jorge Isaac Rojas (Mexico City)

=== Second leg ===
13 May 2018
12:00

Toluca	4–1	Tijuana
Uribe 9', 31', 86'; Barrientos 88'	Report	Chávez 66'

Estadio Nemesio Díez, Toluca
Attendance: 27,480
Referee: Fernando Guerrero (Mexico City)

Toluca won 5–3 on aggregate

13 May 2018
19:00

América	2–2	Santos Laguna
Domínguez 11' (pen.); Valdez 23'	Report	Rodríguez 41'; Isijara 85'

Estadio Azteca, Mexico City
Attendance: 53,218
Referee: Jorge Antonio Pérez (Veracruz)

Santos Laguna won 6–3 on aggregate

== Finals ==
Team 1	Agg.	Team 2	1st leg	2nd leg
Santos Laguna	3–2	Toluca	2–1	1–1

All times are UTC−5

=== First leg ===
17 May 2018
20:00

Santos Laguna	2–1	Toluca
Djaniny 71'; Furch 89'	Report	Quiñónes 53'

Estadio Corona, Torreón
Attendance: 29,215
Referee: Fernando Guerrero (Mexico City)

Santos Laguna	Toluca

GK	1	(Mexico) Jonathan Orozco
DF	2	(Mexico) José Abella
DF	24	(Argentina) Carlos Izquierdoz (c)
DF	3	(Uruguay) Gerardo Alcoba
DF	98	(Mexico) Jesús Angulo	(yellow card) 68'
MF	10	(Paraguay) Osvaldo Martínez
MF	23	(Mexico) José Vázquez
MF	15	(Uruguay) Brian Lozano
FW	13	(Uruguay) Jonathan Rodríguez		(substituted off) 64'
FW	9	(Argentina) Julio Furch
FW	21	(Cape Verde) Djaniny		(substituted off) 81'
Substitutions:
GK	28	(Mexico) Carlos Acevedo
DF	4	(Mexico) Jorge Sánchez
DF	19	(United States) Jorge Villafaña
MF	6	(Mexico) Diego de Buen
MF	7	(Mexico) Jesús Isijara		(substituted on) 64'
MF	27	(Mexico) Javier Cortés
FW	12	(Colombia) Edwin Cetré	(yellow card) 90+3'	(substituted on) 81'
Manager:
(Uruguay) Robert Siboldi

GK	1	(Mexico) Alfredo Talavera
DF	29	(Mexico) Rodrigo Salinas
DF	5	(Chile) Osvaldo González
DF	3	(Argentina) Santiago García	(yellow card) 90+3'
DF	26	(Colombia) Cristian Borja
MF	15	(Mexico) Antonio Ríos
MF	17	(Mexico) Leonel López
MF	24	(Argentina) Pablo Barrientos
MF	14	(Argentina) Rubens Sambueza (c)
FW	23	(Colombia) Luis Quiñones	(yellow card) 68'
FW	20	(Colombia) Fernando Uribe
Substitutions:
GK	22	(Mexico) Luis Manuel García
DF	4	(Uruguay) Maximiliano Perg
DF	33	(Mexico) Carlos Calvo
MF	28	(Mexico) Jorge Sartiaguin
FW	7	(Argentina) Gabriel Hauche
FW	10	(Mexico) Ángel Reyna
FW	31	(Mexico) Martín Abundis
Manager:
(Argentina) Hernán Cristante

Assistant referees:
Alberto Morin Méndez (Chihuahua)
Pablo Israel Hernández (Mexico City)
Fourth official:
Adonai Escobedo González (Aguascalientes)

=== Second leg ===
20 May 2018
19:00

Toluca	1–1	Santos Laguna
Hauche 82'	Report	Furch 10'

Estadio Nemesio Díez, Toluca
Attendance: 31,000
Referee: César Arturo Ramos (Sinaloa)

Santos Laguna won 3–2 on aggregate

Toluca	Santos Laguna

GK	1	(Mexico) Alfredo Talavera
DF	29	(Mexico) Rodrigo Salinas
DF	5	(Chile) Osvaldo González
DF	3	(Argentina) Santiago García		(substituted off) 69'
DF	26	(Colombia) Cristian Borja
MF	15	(Mexico) Antonio Ríos
MF	17	(Mexico) Leonel López		(substituted off) 46'
MF	14	(Argentina) Rubens Sambueza (c)	(yellow card) 84'
MF	24	(Argentina) Pablo Barrientos		(substituted off) 30'
FW	23	(Colombia) Luis Quiñones	(yellow card) 74'
FW	20	(Colombia) Fernando Uribe	(yellow card) 34'
Substitutions:
GK	22	(Mexico) Luis Manuel García
DF	33	(Mexico) Carlos Calvo
DF	35	(Mexico) Juan Delgadillo
MF	28	(Mexico) Jorge Sartiaguin
FW	7	(Argentina) Gabriel Hauche	(yellow card) 90+5'	(substituted on) 69'
FW	10	(Mexico) Ángel Reyna		(substituted on) 46'
FW	25	(Argentina) Alexis Canelo		(substituted on) 30'
Manager:
(Argentina) Hernán Cristante

GK	1	(Mexico) Jonathan Orozco	(yellow card) 85'
DF	2	(Mexico) José Abella
DF	24	(Argentina) Carlos Izquierdoz (c)
DF	3	(Uruguay) Gerardo Alcoba
DF	98	(Mexico) Jesús Angulo	(yellow card) 77'
MF	10	(Paraguay) Osvaldo Martínez	(yellow card) 42'	(substituted off) 55'
MF	23	(Mexico) José Vázquez
MF	15	(Uruguay) Brian Lozano
MF	27	(Mexico) Javier Cortés		(substituted off) 55'
FW	9	(Argentina) Julio Furch
FW	21	(Cape Verde) Djaniny		(substituted off) 60'
Substitutions:
GK	28	(Mexico) Carlos Acevedo
DF	19	(United States) Jorge Villafaña		(substituted on) 55'
MF	6	(Mexico) Diego de Buen		(substituted on) 55'
MF	7	(Mexico) Jesús Isijara
MF	16	(Mexico) Ulíses Rivas
FW	12	(Colombia) Edwin Cetré
FW	13	(Uruguay) Jonathan Rodríguez	(yellow card) 73'	(substituted on) 66'
Manager:
(Uruguay) Robert Siboldi

Assistant referees:
José Luis Camargo (State of Mexico)
Miguel Ángel Hernández (Puebla)
Fourth official:
Jorge Isaac Rojas (Mexico City)

== Goalscorers ==
5 goals

- (Colombia) Fernando Uribe (Toluca)

4 goals

- (Argentina) Julio Furch (Santos Laguna)

3 goals

- (Argentina) Juan Martín Lucero (Tijuana)
- (Colombia) Mateus Uribe (América)

2 goals

- (Argentina) Pablo Barrientos (Toluca)
- (Paraguay) Cecilio Domínguez (América)
- (Argentina) Emanuel Loeschbor (Morelia)
- (Paraguay) Osvaldo Martínez (Santos Laguna)
- (France) Jérémy Ménez (América)
- (Colombia) Dorlan Pabón (Monterrey)
- (Cape Verde) Djaniny (Santos Laguna)

1 goal

- (Mexico) Hugo Ayala (UANL)
- (Ecuador) Miller Bolaños (Tijuana)
- (Colombia) Cristian Borja (Toluca)
- (Chile) Nicolás Castillo (UNAM)
- (Colombia) Edwin Cetré (Santos Laguna)
- (Mexico) Luis Chávez (Tijuana)
- (Mexico) Jesús Gallardo (UNAM)
- (France) André-Pierre Gignac (UANL)
- (Argentina) Gabriel Hauche (Toluca)
- (Colombia) Andrés Ibargüen (América)
- (Mexico) Jesus Isijara (Santos Laguna)
- (Mexico) Mario Osuna (Morelia)
- (Colombia) Dorlan Pabón (Monterrey)
- (Colombia) Luis Quiñones (Toluca)
- (Uruguay) Ignacio Rivero (Tijuana)
- (Uruguay) Jonathan Rodríguez (Santos Laguna)
- (Argentina) Rubens Sambueza (Toluca)
- (Mexico) Miguel Sansores (Morelia)
- (Paraguay) Bruno Valdez (América)
