= Apertura 2017 Liga MX final phase =

Apertura 2017 Final phase
Tournament details
- Country: Mexico
- Dates: 22 November–10 December 2017
- Teams: 8

Final positions
- Champions: Tigres UANL (6th title)
- Runners-up: Monterrey

Tournament statistics
- Matches played: 14
- Goals scored: 32 (2.29 per match)
- Attendance: 498,756 (35,625 per match)

The Apertura 2017 Liga MX championship stage commonly known as Liguilla (mini league) was played from 22 November to 10 December 2017. A total of eight teams competed in the championship stage to decide the champions of the Apertura 2017 Liga MX season. Both finalists qualified to the 2019 CONCACAF Champions League.

== Qualified teams ==
Pos	Team	Pld	W	D	L	GF	GA	GD	Pts	Qualification or relegation
1	Monterrey	17	11	4	2	29	12	+17	37	Advance to Liguilla
2	Tigres UANL	17	9	5	3	28	16	+12	32	Advance to Liguilla
3	América	17	9	3	5	23	18	+5	30	Advance to Liguilla
4	Morelia	17	8	5	4	25	17	+8	29	Advance to Liguilla
5	Toluca	17	8	5	4	24	21	+3	29	Advance to Liguilla
6	Cruz Azul	17	7	6	4	22	22	0	27	Advance to Liguilla
7	León	17	8	2	7	27	23	+4	26	Advance to Liguilla
8	Atlas	17	7	4	6	23	19	+4	25	Advance to Liguilla

Source: Liga MX
Rules for classification: 1) Points; 2) Goal difference; 3) Number of goals scored; 4) Head-to-head results between tied teams; 5) Number of goals scored away; 6) Highest relegation coefficient; 7) Fair Play points

== Format ==
- Teams are re-seeded each round.
- Team with more goals on aggregate after two matches advances.
- Away goals rule is applied in the quarterfinals and semifinals, but not the final.
- In the quarterfinals and semifinals, if the two teams are tied on aggregate and away goals, the higher seeded team advances.
- In the final, if the two teams are tied after both legs, the match goes to extra time and, if necessary, a shoot-out.
- Both finalists qualify to the 2019 CONCACAF Champions League (in Pot 3).

=== Bracket ===
Quarterfinals
1	Monterrey	2	4	6
8	Atlas	1	1	2
4	Morelia (s)	1	2	3
5	Toluca	2	1	3
2	Tigres UANL (s)	1	1	2
7	León	1	1	2
3	América (s)	0	0	0
6	Cruz Azul	0	0	0

Semifinals
1	Monterrey	1	4	5
4	Morelia	0	0	0
2	Tigres UANL	1	3	4
3	América	0	0	0

Finals
1	Monterrey	1	1	2
2	Tigres UANL	1	2	3

== Quarterfinals ==
Team 1	Agg.	Team 2	1st leg	2nd leg
Atlas	2–6	Monterrey	1–2	1–4
León	2–2	Tigres UANL (s)	1–1	1–1
Cruz Azul	0–0	América (s)	0–0	0–0
Toluca	3–3	Morelia (s)	2–1	1–2

All times are UTC−6

=== First leg ===
22 November 2017
19:30

Toluca	2–1	Morelia
Uribe 90+1'; Barrientos 90+4'	Report	Ruidíaz 66' (pen.)

Estadio Nemesio Díez, Toluca
Attendance: 15,799
Referee: Jorge Antonio Pérez (Veracruz)

22 November 2017
21:36

León	1–1	Tigres UANL
Boselli 59'	Report	Vargas 76'

Estadio León, León
Attendance: 15,005
Referee: Diego Montaño (Jalisco)

23 November 2017
19:30

Cruz Azul	0–0	América
	Report

Estadio Azul, Mexico City
Attendance: 22,889
Referee: Jorge Isaac Rojas (Mexico City)

23 November 2017
21:30

Atlas	1–2	Monterrey
Tabó 35'	Report	Funes Mori 5', 17'

Estadio Jalisco, Guadalajara
Attendance: 36,334
Referee: Luis Enrique Santander (Guanajuato)

=== Second leg ===
25 November 2017
19:00

Tigres UANL	1–1	León
Gignac 20'	Report	Mosquera 25'

Estadio Universitario, San Nicolás de los Garza
Attendance: 41,159
Referee: Jorge Antonio Pérez (Veracruz)

2–2 on aggregate and tied on away goals. Tigres UANL advanced for being the higher seed in the classification table.

25 November 2017
21:00

Morelia	2–1	Toluca
Ruidíaz 6'; Sepúlveda 15'	Report	Uribe 4'

Estadio Morelos, Morelia
Attendance: 26,094
Referee: Oscar Macías Romo (Aguascalientes)

3–3 on aggregate and tied on away goals. Morelia advanced for being the higher seed in the classification table.

26 November 2017
18:00

Monterrey	4–1	Atlas
Funes Mori 15'; C. Sánchez 26'; Hurtado 29', 40'	Report	Caraglio 34' (pen.)

Estadio BBVA Bancomer, Guadalupe
Attendance: 45,253
Referee: Jorge Isaac Rojas (Mexico City)

Monterrey won 6–2 on aggregate

26 November 2017
20:00

América	0–0	Cruz Azul
	Report

Estadio Azteca, Mexico City
Attendance: 48,391
Referee: Fernando Guerrero (Mexico City)

0–0 on aggregate and tied on away goals. América advanced for being the higher seed in the classification table.

== Semifinals ==
Team 1	Agg.	Team 2	1st leg	2nd leg
Morelia	0–5	Monterrey	0–1	0–4
América	0–4	Tigres UANL	0–1	0–3

All times are UTC−6

=== First leg ===
29 November 2017
21:00

América	0–1	Tigres UANL
	Report	Juninho 49' (pen.)

Estadio Azteca, Mexico City
Attendance: 31,566
Referee: Oscar Macías Romo (Aguascalientes)

30 November 2017
19:30

Morelia	0–1	Monterrey
	Report	Hurtado 38' (pen.)

Estadio Morelos, Morelia
Attendance: 30,473
Referee: Jorge Antonio Pérez (Veracruz)

=== Second leg ===
2 December 2017
19:00

Tigres UANL	3–0	América
Valencia 56', 72'; Gignac 76' (pen.)	Report

Estadio Universitario, San Nicolás de los Garza
Attendance: 41,580
Referee: Fernando Guerrero (Mexico City)

Tigres UANL won 4–0 on aggregate

3 December 2017
18:00

Monterrey	4–0	Morelia
Funes Mori 10', 29', 53'; C. Sánchez 22' (pen.)	Report

Estadio BBVA Bancomer, Guadalupe
Attendance: 50,544
Referee: Jorge Isaac Rojas (Mexico City)

Monterrey won 5–0 on aggregate

== Finals ==
Team 1	Agg.	Team 2	1st leg	2nd leg
Tigres UANL	3–2	Monterrey	1–1	2–1

All times are UTC−6

=== First leg ===
7 December 2017
20:00

Tigres UANL	1–1	Monterrey
Valencia 26' (pen.)	Report	N. Sánchez 9'

Estadio Universitario, San Nicolás de los Garza
Attendance: 41,602
Referee: Jorge Isaac Rojas (Mexico City)

Tigres UANL	Monterrey

GK	1	(Argentina) Nahuel Guzmán	(yellow card) 43'
DF	6	(Mexico) Jorge Torres Nilo
DF	3	(Brazil) Juninho (c)
DF	4	(Mexico) Hugo Ayala	(yellow card) 85' (yellow-red card) 90+1'
DF	28	(Mexico) Luis Rodríguez	(yellow card) 36'
MF	29	(Mexico) Jesús Dueñas	(yellow card) 65'
MF	5	(Brazil) Rafael Carioca
MF	20	(Mexico) Javier Aquino
FW	9	(Chile) Eduardo Vargas		(substituted off) 80'
FW	10	(France) André-Pierre Gignac
FW	13	(Ecuador) Enner Valencia
Substitutions:
GK	36	(Mexico) Lalo Fernández
DF	21	(Colombia) Francisco Meza
MF	17	(United States) Jose Francisco Torres
MF	19	(Colombia) Larry Vásquez
MF	25	(Mexico) Jürgen Damm
MF	27	(Mexico) Alberto Acosta
FW	18	(Argentina) Ismael Sosa		(substituted on) 80'
Manager:
(Brazil) Ricardo Ferretti

GK	1	(Mexico) Hugo González
DF	11	(Argentina) Leonel Vangioni	(yellow card) 74' (yellow-red card) 88'
DF	15	(Argentina) José María Basanta (c)	(yellow card) 31'
DF	4	(Argentina) Nicolás Sánchez		(substituted off) 46'
DF	33	(Colombia) Stefan Medina	(yellow card) 81'
MF	25	(United States) Jonathan González
MF	13	(Uruguay) Carlos Sánchez	(yellow card) 58'
MF	16	(Paraguay) Celso Ortiz		(substituted off) 86'
FW	8	(Colombia) Dorlan Pabón
FW	18	(Colombia) Avilés Hurtado		(substituted off) 69'
FW	7	(Argentina) Rogelio Funes Mori	(yellow card) 26'
Substitutions:
GK	24	(Mexico) Édson Reséndez
DF	3	(Mexico) César Montes		(substituted on) 46'
DF	5	(Mexico) Luis Fuentes
DF	6	(Mexico) Efraín Juárez
MF	14	(Mexico) Alfonso González		(substituted on) 86'
MF	21	(Mexico) Jesús Molina	(yellow card) 90+3'	(substituted on) 69'
FW	29	(Mexico) Marco Bueno
Manager:
(Argentina) Antonio Mohamed

Assistant referees:
José Luis Camargo (State of Mexico)
Christian Kiabek Espinosa (Mexico City)
Fourth official:
Oscar Macías Romo (Aguascalientes)

=== Second leg ===
10 December 2017
18:00

Monterrey	1–2	Tigres UANL
Pabón 2'	Report	Vargas 30'; Meza 35'

Estadio BBVA Bancomer, Guadalupe
Attendance: 52,067
Referee: Fernando Guerrero (Mexico City)

Tigres UANL won 3–2 on aggregate

Monterrey	Tigres UANL

GK	1	(Mexico) Hugo González
DF	15	(Argentina) José María Basanta (c)		(substituted off) 46'
DF	3	(Mexico) César Montes
DF	4	(Argentina) Nicolás Sánchez
DF	33	(Colombia) Stefan Medina
MF	25	(United States) Jonathan González		(substituted off) 80'
MF	19	(Argentina) Neri Cardozo	(red card) 90+6'
MF	13	(Uruguay) Carlos Sánchez		(substituted off) 87'
FW	18	(Colombia) Avilés Hurtado
FW	8	(Colombia) Dorlan Pabón
FW	7	(Argentina) Rogelio Funes Mori
Substitutions:
GK	24	(Mexico) Édson Reséndez
DF	5	(Mexico) Luis Fuentes		(substituted on) 46'
DF	6	(Mexico) Efraín Juárez
MF	14	(Mexico) Alfonso González
MF	17	(Mexico) Jesús Zavala		(substituted on) 87'
MF	21	(Mexico) Jesús Molina
FW	27	(Paraguay) Jorge Benítez		(substituted on) 80'
Manager:
(Argentina) Antonio Mohamed

GK	1	(Argentina) Nahuel Guzmán
DF	6	(Mexico) Jorge Torres Nilo
DF	21	(Colombia) Francisco Meza
DF	3	(Brazil) Juninho (c)
DF	28	(Mexico) Luis Rodríguez
MF	29	(Mexico) Jesús Dueñas	(substituted off) 81'
MF	5	(Brazil) Rafael Carioca
MF	20	(Mexico) Javier Aquino
FW	9	(Chile) Eduardo Vargas	(substituted off) 61'
FW	10	(France) André-Pierre Gignac
FW	13	(Ecuador) Enner Valencia	(substituted off) 76'
Substitutions:
GK	36	(Mexico) Lalo Fernández
DF	14	(Mexico) Jorge Iván Estrada
DF	15	(France) Timothée Kolodziejczak
MF	17	(United States) Jose Francisco Torres
MF	25	(Mexico) Jürgen Damm	(substituted on) 61'
MF	27	(Mexico) Alberto Acosta	(substituted on) 81'
FW	18	(Argentina) Ismael Sosa	(substituted on) 76'
Manager:
(Brazil) Ricardo Ferretti

Assistant referees:
Marcos Quintero (Jalisco)
Pablo Israel Hernández (Mexico City)
Fourth official:
Jorge Antonio Pérez (Veracruz)

== Goalscorers ==
6 goals

- (Argentina) Rogelio Funes Mori (Monterrey)

3 goals

- (Colombia) Avilés Hurtado (Monterrey)
- (Ecuador) Enner Valencia (Tigres UANL)

2 goals

- (France) André-Pierre Gignac (Tigres UANL)
- (Peru) Raúl Ruidíaz (Morelia)
- (Uruguay) Carlos Sánchez (Monterrey)
- (Colombia) Fernando Uribe (Toluca)
- (Chile) Eduardo Vargas (Tigres UANL)

1 goal

- (Argentina) Pablo Barrientos (Toluca)
- (Argentina) Mauro Boselli (León)
- (Colombia) Francisco Meza (Tigres UANL)
- (Colombia) Andrés Mosquera (León)
- (Colombia) Dorlan Pabón (Monterrey)
- (Argentina) Nicolás Sánchez (Monterrey)
- (Mexico) Ángel Sepúlveda (Morelia)
- (Uruguay) Christian Tabó (Atlas)
- (Brazil) Juninho (Tigres UANL)
