= Ignacio Sánchez =

Ignacio or Nacho Sánchez may refer to:

- Ignacio Sánchez Mejías (1891-1934), Spanish bullfighter
- Nacho Sánchez Amor (born 1960), member of the European Parliament
- Ignacio Sánchez-Cuenca (born 1966), Spanish social scientist
- Ignacio Sánchez (footballer) (born 1972), Mexican footballer
- Ignacio Sánchez (volleyball player) (born 1991), volleyball player
- Nacho Sánchez (actor) (born 1992), Spanish actor
- Nacho (footballer, born 1993), Spanish footballer
