= 2017–18 Liga MX season =

71st professional season of the top-flight football league in Mexico

Liga MX
- Season: 2017–18
- Champions: Apertura: UANL (6th title); Clausura: Santos Laguna (6th title)
- Relegated: None (Note: BUAP was supposed to be relegated but Tapachula were not certified to be promoted prior to the beginning of the season.)
- Champions League: UANL; Monterrey; Santos Laguna; Toluca
- Matches: 306
- Goals: 775 (2.53 per match); Apertura: 388 (2.54 per match); Clausura: 387 (2.53 per match)
- Top goalscorer: Apertura: Mauro Boselli; Avilés Hurtado (11 goals); Clausura: Djaniny (14 goals)
- Biggest home win: Apertura: UANL 5–0 Puebla (July 22, 2017); Necaxa 5–0 BUAP (October 28, 2017); Clausura: BUAP 5–0 Veracruz (February 24, 2018); Cruz Azul 5–0 Pachuca (March 10, 2018)
- Biggest away win: Apertura: Querétaro 0–4 BUAP (July 29, 2017); Clausura: León 0–4 Necaxa (January 27, 2018); Puebla 2–6 Pachuca (April 6, 2018)
- Highest scoring: Apertura: León 6–2 Veracruz (October 28, 2017); Clausura: Puebla 2–6 Pachuca (April 6, 2018)
- Longest winning run: Apertura: 5 matches León; Monterrey; Clausura: 9 matches Toluca
- Longest unbeaten run: Apertura: 11 matches Monterrey; Clausura: 11 matches América
- Longest winless run: Apertura: 12 matches Querétaro; Clausura: 8 matches BUAP; Cruz Azul; UNAM
- Longest losing run: Apertura: 5 matches Veracruz; Clausura: 5 matches BUAP; Puebla
- Highest attendance: Apertura: 51,507; Monterrey vs América (October 28, 2017); Clausura: 51,307; America vs Cruz Azul (March 31, 2018)
- Lowest attendance: Apertura: 4,651; BUAP vs Tijuana (October 17, 2017); Clausura: 7,183; BUAP vs Atlas (February 10, 2018)
- Total attendance: Apertura: 3,571,757; Clausura: 3,881,277; Overall: 7,453,034
- Average attendance: Apertura: 23,345; Clausura: 25,368
- Stats are from the regular season only Source: ESPN FC

The 2017–18 Liga MX season (known as the Liga BBVA Bancomer MX for sponsorship reasons) was the 71st professional season of the top-flight football league in Mexico. The season is split into two championships—the Torneo Apertura and the Torneo Clausura—each in an identical format and each contested by the same eighteen teams.

== Clubs ==
These are the eighteen teams that competed in the 2017-18 season. Chiapas was relegated to the Ascenso MX after accumulating the lowest coefficient last season, and were replaced by the Ascenso MX Clausura 2017 champion Lobos BUAP, who won promotion after defeating the Ascenso MX Apertura 2016 champion Dorados de Sinaloa in the 2016–17 Ascenso MX Promotion Final.

=== Stadiums and locations ===
| América | Atlas | BUAP | Cruz Azul | Guadalajara | León |
|---|---|---|---|---|---|
| Estadio Azteca | Estadio Jalisco | Estadio Universitario BUAP | Estadio Azul | Estadio Akron | Estadio León |
| Capacity: 87,000 | Capacity: 55,110 | Capacity: 19,283 | Capacity: 33,000 | Capacity: 45,364 | Capacity: 31,297 |
| | Barra 51 | | | | |
| Monterrey | Morelia | Necaxa | Pachuca | Puebla | Querétaro |
| Estadio BBVA Bancomer | Estadio Morelos | Estadio Victoria | Estadio Hidalgo | Estadio Cuauhtémoc | Estadio Corregidora |
| Capacity: 51,348 | Capacity: 34,795 | Capacity: 23,851 | Capacity: 27,512 | Capacity: 51,726 | Capacity: 33,162 |
| Santos Laguna | Tijuana | Toluca | UANL | UNAM | Veracruz |
| Estadio Corona | Estadio Caliente | Estadio Nemesio Díez | Estadio Universitario | Estadio Olímpico Universitario | Estadio Luis "Pirata" Fuente |
| Capacity: 29,237 | Capacity: 27,333 | Capacity: 31,000 | Capacity: 41,886 | Capacity: 48,297 | Capacity: 28,703 |

Locations of clubs for the 2016–17 Liga MX season

=== Personnel and kits ===
| Team | Chairman | Head coach | Captain | Kit manufacturer | Shirt sponsor(s) |
|---|---|---|---|---|---|
| América | Santiago Baños | (Mexico) Miguel Herrera | (Mexico) Oribe Peralta | Nike | Huawei |
| Atlas | Gustavo Guzmán | (Mexico) Gerardo Espinoza (Interim) | (Mexico) Rafael Márquez | Adidas | Wibe |
| BUAP | Rafael Cañedo Carrión | (Mexico) Daniel Alcántar (Interim) | (Mexico) Francisco Javier Rodríguez | Keuka | Zurich |
| Cruz Azul | Guillermo Álvarez Cuevas | (Portugal) Pedro Caixinha | (Mexico) José de Jesús Corona | Under Armour | Cemento Cruz Azul |
| Guadalajara | Jorge Vergara | (Argentina) Matías Almeyda | (Mexico) Carlos Salcido | Puma | None |
| León | Jesús Martínez Murguia | (Uruguay) Gustavo Díaz | (Argentina) Mauro Boselli | Pirma | Cementos Fortaleza |
| Monterrey | Duilio Davino | (Argentina) Antonio Mohamed | (Argentina) José María Basanta | Puma | AT&T |
| Morelia | Álvaro Dávila | (Mexico) Roberto Hernández | (Ecuador) Gabriel Achilier | Pirma | Caliente |
| Necaxa | Ernesto Tinajero Flores | (Mexico) Ignacio Ambríz | (Argentina) Marcelo Barovero | Charly | Rolcar |
| Pachuca | Jesús Martínez Patiño | (Uruguay) Diego Alonso | (Mexico) Erick Gutiérrez | Nike | Cementos Fortaleza |
| Puebla | Manuel Jiménez García | (Mexico) Enrique Meza | (Mexico) Óscar Rojas | Charly | Caliente |
| Querétaro | Jaime Ordiales | (Mexico) Luis Fernando Tena | (Argentina) Miguel Martínez | Puma | Banco Multiva |
| Santos Laguna | Alejandro Irarragorri | (Uruguay) Robert Siboldi | (Argentina) Carlos Izquierdoz | Puma | Soriana |
| Tijuana | Jorge Hank Inzunsa | (Argentina) Diego Cocca | (Argentina) Ignacio Malcorra | Charly | Caliente |
| Toluca | Francisco Suinaga | (Argentina) Hernán Cristante | (Mexico) Antonio Rios | Under Armour | Citibanamex |
| UANL | Alejandro Rodríguez Michelsen | (Brazil) Ricardo Ferretti | (Brazil) Juninho | Adidas | Cemex |
| UNAM | Rodrigo Ares de Parga | (Mexico) David Patiño | (Mexico) Pablo Barrera | Nike | DHL |
| Veracruz | Fidel Kuri Mustieles | (Mexico) Guillermo Vázquez | (Peru) Pedro Gallese | Charly | Winpot Casino |

=== Managerial changes ===
| Team | Outgoing manager | Manner of departure | Date of vacancy | Replaced by | Date of appointment | Position in table | Ref. |
Pre-Apertura changes
| América | (Argentina) Ricardo La Volpe | End of contract | May 7, 2017 | (Mexico) Miguel Herrera | May 26, 2017 | Preseason | |
| Tijuana | (Mexico) Miguel Herrera | Mutual agreement | May 26, 2017 | (Argentina) Eduardo Coudet | May 26, 2017 | Preseason | |
Apertura changes
| UNAM | (Mexico) Francisco Palencia | Sacked | August 23, 2017 | (Argentina) Sergio Egea (interim) | August 23, 2017 | 15th | |
| León | (Argentina) Javier Torrente | Sacked | August 26, 2017 | (Argentina) Rubén Ayala (Interim) | August 27, 2017 | 14th | |
| León | (Argentina) Rubén Ayala (Interim) | End of tenure as caretaker | August 27, 2017 | (Uruguay) Gustavo Díaz | August 30, 2017 | 14th | |
| Santos Laguna | (Mexico) José Manuel de la Torre | Sacked | September 18, 2017 | (Uruguay) Robert Siboldi (Interim) | September 18, 2017 | 15th | |
| Veracruz | (Mexico) Juan Antonio Luna | Sacked | September 23, 2017 | (Paraguay) José Cardozo | September 23, 2017 | 11th | |
| Puebla | (Mexico) Rafael García | Sacked | September 26, 2017 | (Mexico) Ignacio Sánchez (Interim) | September 26, 2017 | 18th | |
| Puebla | (Mexico) Ignacio Sánchez (Interim) | End of tenure as caretaker | October 3, 2017 | (Mexico) Enrique Meza | October 3, 2017 | 17th | |
| UNAM | (Argentina) Sergio Egea (Interim) | Resigned | October 3, 2017 | (Mexico) David Patiño (Interim) | October 3, 2017 | 18th | |
| Querétaro | (Mexico) Jaime Lozano | Sacked | October 22, 2017 | (Mexico) Luis Fernando Tena | October 22, 2017 | 18th | |
| Tijuana | (Argentina) Eduardo Coudet | Mutual agreement | October 30, 2017 | (Mexico) Diego Torres Ortíz (Interim) | October 31, 2017 | 11th | |
Pre-Clausura changes
| Veracruz | (Paraguay) José Cardozo | Sacked | November 23, 2017 | (Mexico) Guillermo Vázquez | December 1, 2017 | Preseason | |
| Cruz Azul | (Spain) Paco Jémez | Mutual agreement | November 27, 2017 | (Portugal) Pedro Caixinha | December 5, 2017 | Preseason | |
| Tijuana | (Mexico) Diego Torres Ortíz (Interim) | End of tenure as caretaker | December 7, 2017 | (Argentina) Diego Cocca | December 7, 2017 | Preseason | |
Clausura changes
| Atlas | (Mexico) José Guadalupe Cruz | Sacked | January 15, 2018 | (Mexico) Gerardo Espinoza (Interim) | January 15, 2018 | 17th | |
| Atlas | (Mexico) Gerardo Espinoza (Interim) | End of tenure as caretaker | January 25, 2018 | (Argentina) Rubén Omar Romano | January 25, 2018 | 17th | |
| Atlas | (Argentina) Rubén Omar Romano | Sacked | March 19, 2018 | (Mexico) Gerardo Espinoza (Interim) | March 19, 2018 | 18th | |
| BUAP | (Mexico) Rafael Puente Jr. | Sacked | April 2, 2018 | (Mexico) Daniel Alcántar (Interim) | April 2, 2018 | 18th | |

== Torneo Apertura ==
The Apertura 2017 is the first championship of the season.

=== Regular phase ===
The season began on 21 July 2017 and ended on 19 November 2017.

==== League table ====
| Pos | Team | Pld | W | D | L | GF | GA | GD | Pts | Qualification or relegation |
|---|---|---|---|---|---|---|---|---|---|---|
| 1 | Monterrey | 17 | 11 | 4 | 2 | 29 | 12 | +17 | 37 | Advance to Liguilla (Note: The first 8 places in the table qualify for the Liguilla.) |
| 2 | UANL (C) | 17 | 9 | 5 | 3 | 28 | 16 | +12 | 32 | Advance to Liguilla |
| 3 | América | 17 | 9 | 3 | 5 | 23 | 18 | +5 | 30 | Advance to Liguilla |
| 4 | Morelia | 17 | 8 | 5 | 4 | 25 | 17 | +8 | 29 | Advance to Liguilla |
| 5 | Toluca | 17 | 8 | 5 | 4 | 24 | 21 | +3 | 29 | Advance to Liguilla |
| 6 | Cruz Azul | 17 | 7 | 6 | 4 | 22 | 22 | 0 | 27 | Advance to Liguilla |
| 7 | León | 17 | 8 | 2 | 7 | 27 | 23 | +4 | 26 | Advance to Liguilla |
| 8 | Atlas | 17 | 7 | 4 | 6 | 23 | 19 | +4 | 25 | Advance to Liguilla |
| 9 | Necaxa | 17 | 6 | 6 | 5 | 19 | 15 | +4 | 24 | |
| 10 | BUAP | 17 | 7 | 2 | 8 | 26 | 31 | −5 | 23 | |
| 11 | Tijuana | 17 | 6 | 3 | 8 | 17 | 23 | −6 | 21 | |
| 12 | Pachuca | 17 | 5 | 4 | 8 | 23 | 25 | −2 | 19 | |
| 13 | Guadalajara | 17 | 4 | 6 | 7 | 21 | 23 | −2 | 18 | |
| 14 | Santos Laguna | 17 | 3 | 9 | 5 | 20 | 23 | −3 | 18 | |
| 15 | Puebla | 17 | 3 | 7 | 7 | 14 | 20 | −6 | 16 | |
| 16 | Querétaro | 17 | 3 | 7 | 7 | 19 | 27 | −8 | 16 | |
| 17 | Veracruz | 17 | 4 | 2 | 11 | 14 | 28 | −14 | 14 | Team is last in Relegation table |
| 18 | UNAM | 17 | 3 | 4 | 10 | 14 | 25 | −11 | 13 | |

Source: Liga MX
Rules for classification: 1) Points; 2) Goal difference; 3) Number of goals scored; 4) Head-to-head results between tied teams; 5) Number of goals scored away; 6) Highest relegation coefficient; 7) Fair Play points
(C) Champions

==== Positions by round ====
The table lists the positions of teams after each week of matches. In order to preserve chronological evolvements, any postponed matches are not included in the round at which they were originally scheduled, but added to the full round they were played immediately afterwards. For example, if a match is scheduled for matchday 13, but then postponed and played between days 16 and 17, it will be added to the standings for day 16.

| Team ╲ Round | 1 | 2 | 3 | 4 | 5 | 6 | 7 | 8 | 9 | 10 | 11 | 12 | 13 | 14 | 15 | 16 | 17 |
|---|---|---|---|---|---|---|---|---|---|---|---|---|---|---|---|---|---|
| Monterrey | 9 | 7 | 2 | 1 | 1 | 1 | 1 | 1 | 1 | 1 | 1 | 1 | 1 | 1 | 1 | 1 | 1 |
| UANL | 1 | 3 | 7 | 11 | 5 | 4 | 3 | 5 | 6 | 4 | 3 | 5 | 4 | 3 | 2 | 2 | 2 |
| América | 14 | 8 | 6 | 2 | 2 | 2 | 2 | 2 | 2 | 3 | 2 | 2 | 2 | 2 | 5 | 3 | 3 |
| Morelia | 12 | 13 | 12 | 14 | 16 | 14 | 9 | 6 | 7 | 10 | 8 | 6 | 5 | 4 | 3 | 4 | 4 |
| Toluca | 10 | 5 | 3 | 3 | 4 | 6 | 4 | 4 | 3 | 2 | 5 | 4 | 3 | 6 | 7 | 6 | 5 |
| Cruz Azul | 4 | 6 | 8 | 8 | 3 | 3 | 6 | 7 | 4 | 7 | 6 | 7 | 7 | 8 | 8 | 9 | 6 |
| León | 17 | 18 | 15 | 12 | 14 | 11 | 15 | 9 | 8 | 5 | 4 | 3 | 6 | 5 | 4 | 5 | 7 |
| Atlas | 2 | 1 | 5 | 7 | 10 | 10 | 13 | 16 | 16 | 13 | 11 | 9 | 10 | 9 | 9 | 8 | 8 |
| Necaxa | 3 | 2 | 4 | 5 | 6 | 7 | 5 | 8 | 9 | 6 | 7 | 8 | 8 | 7 | 6 | 7 | 9 |
| BUAP | 8 | 4 | 1 | 4 | 8 | 8 | 12 | 13 | 10 | 8 | 9 | 11 | 12 | 12 | 12 | 11 | 10 |
| Tijuana | 15 | 16 | 18 | 18 | 15 | 12 | 7 | 3 | 5 | 9 | 10 | 10 | 9 | 10 | 11 | 10 | 11 |
| Pachuca | 13 | 15 | 17 | 15 | 12 | 5 | 10 | 11 | 13 | 12 | 12 | 13 | 11 | 11 | 10 | 12 | 12 |
| Guadalajara | 11 | 12 | 11 | 16 | 18 | 18 | 17 | 15 | 12 | 14 | 16 | 16 | 18 | 15 | 14 | 15 | 13 |
| Santos Laguna | 7 | 11 | 10 | 13 | 17 | 17 | 14 | 14 | 15 | 16 | 15 | 15 | 14 | 13 | 13 | 13 | 14 |
| Puebla | 18 | 14 | 16 | 17 | 13 | 16 | 18 | 18 | 18 | 18 | 17 | 17 | 15 | 16 | 15 | 14 | 15 |
| Querétaro | 5 | 10 | 9 | 6 | 7 | 9 | 11 | 12 | 14 | 15 | 14 | 14 | 17 | 18 | 17 | 16 | 16 |
| Veracruz | 16 | 17 | 14 | 10 | 9 | 13 | 8 | 10 | 11 | 11 | 13 | 12 | 13 | 14 | 16 | 17 | 17 |
| UNAM | 6 | 9 | 13 | 9 | 11 | 15 | 16 | 17 | 17 | 17 | 18 | 18 | 16 | 17 | 18 | 18 | 18 |

| Leader and qualification to playoffs |
| Qualification to playoffs |
| Last place in table |

Source: Liga MX

=== Results ===
| Home \ Away | AMÉ | ATL | BUP | CAZ | GUA | LEÓ | MON | MOR | NEC | PAC | PUE | QUE | SLA | TIJ | TOL | UNL | UNM | VER |
|---|---|---|---|---|---|---|---|---|---|---|---|---|---|---|---|---|---|---|
| América | | | | | 2–1 | | | | 0–1 | | 1–1 | 0–1 | | | | 2–2 | 2–1 | 2–0 |
| Atlas | 0–1 | | 1–1 | | | | | 0–1 | | 1–1 | | | | 1–0 | | 1–1 | 2–1 | 2–0 |
| BUAP | 2–3 | | | 3–0 | | 0–3 | 2–1 | 1–3 | | 3–2 | | | 2–2 | 1–2 | | | | |
| Cruz Azul | 1–3 | 2–1 | | | 1–1 | | 1–1 | | | | | | 2–1 | | 0–0 | 1–2 | | 1–0 |
| Guadalajara | | 1–2 | 1–2 | | | | | 1–2 | 2–2 | | 0–1 | 0–0 | | 3–1 | 0–0 | | 1–1 | |
| León | 2–1 | 0–3 | | 2–2 | 0–2 | | 1–2 | | | 3–1 | | | 1–2 | | | 1–0 | | 6–2 |
| Monterrey | 2–0 | 2–1 | | | 4–1 | | | | 1–0 | 2–0 | | | 1–1 | | 4–1 | 2–0 | | 1–0 |
| Morelia | 2–0 | | | 1–2 | | 0–0 | 0–0 | | | 1–2 | | | 1–1 | 3–0 | | 3–3 | | |
| Necaxa | | 2–1 | 5–0 | 1–1 | | 0–3 | | 1–2 | | | 1–1 | 1–0 | | 1–0 | | | 0–0 | |
| Pachuca | 0–2 | | | 4–0 | 1–3 | | | | 0–0 | | 1–0 | 0–1 | | | 2–2 | 2–1 | | 4–1 |
| Puebla | | 1–2 | 0–1 | 0–0 | | 0–1 | 2–0 | 1–1 | | | | 2–2 | | 1–1 | | | 0–3 | |
| Querétaro | | 2–2 | 0–4 | 1–2 | | 1–2 | 2–2 | 2–1 | | | | | 1–2 | 1–3 | | | 1–1 | |
| Santos Laguna | 0–1 | 0–1 | | | 1–1 | | | | 3–2 | 2–2 | 0–0 | | | | 0–0 | 1–1 | | 2–3 |
| Tijuana | 1–1 | | | 0–2 | | 2–1 | 0–3 | | | 2–1 | | | 2–0 | | | 0–1 | | 0–0 |
| Toluca | 1–2 | 3–2 | 3–1 | | | 3–1 | | 0–1 | 0–0 | | 2–1 | 3–2 | | 3–1 | | | 2–1 | |
| UANL | | | 3–2 | | 1–0 | | | | 1–0 | | 5–0 | 1–1 | | | 3–0 | | 2–0 | 1–0 |
| UNAM | | | 2–0 | 1–4 | | 2–0 | 0–1 | 1–2 | | 1–0 | | | 2–2 | 0–2 | | | | |
| Veracruz | | | 0–1 | | 2–3 | | | 2–1 | 0–2 | | 2–0 | 1–1 | | | 0–1 | | 1–0 | |

Updated to match(es) played on unknown. Source: Liga MX
Legend: Blue = home team win; Yellow = draw; Red = away team win.

=== Top goalscorers ===
Players sorted first by goals scored, then by last name.

| Rank | Player | Club | Goals |
|---|---|---|---|
| 1 | (Argentina) Mauro Boselli | León | 11 |
| 1 | (Colombia) Avilés Hurtado | Monterrey | 11 |
| 3 | (Argentina) Julio Furch | Santos Laguna | 9 |
| 3 | (Colombia) Julián Quiñones | BUAP | 9 |
| 3 | (Peru) Raúl Ruidíaz | Morelia | 9 |
| 3 | (Ecuador) Enner Valencia | UANL | 9 |
| 7 | (Mexico) Víctor Guzmán | Pachuca | 8 |
| 7 | (Chile) Felipe Mora | Cruz Azul | 8 |
| 7 | (Brazil) Camilo Sanvezzo | Querétaro | 8 |
| 7 | (Colombia) Fernando Uribe | Toluca | 8 |

Source: Liga MX

==== Hat-tricks ====
| Player | For | Against | Result | Date |
|---|---|---|---|---|
| (Ecuador) Enner Valencia | UANL | Puebla | 5–0 | 22 July 2017 |

==== Clean sheets ====
| Rank | Player | Club | Clean sheets | Avg. |
|---|---|---|---|---|
| 1 | (Mexico) Hugo González | Monterrey | 8 | 0.63 |
| 1 | (Argentina) Marcelo Barovero | Necaxa | 8 | 0.88 |
| 3 | (Argentina) Nahuel Guzmán | UANL | 7 | 0.94 |
| 4 | (Uruguay) Sebastián Sosa | Morelia | 6 | 1.00 |
| 5 | (Mexico) Moisés Muñoz | Puebla | 4 | 0.93 |
| 5 | (Argentina) Agustín Marchesín | América | 4 | 1.06 |
| 5 | (Mexico) Luis Manuel García | Toluca | 4 | 1.31 |
| 5 | (Mexico) Alfredo Saldívar | UNAM | 4 | 1.47 |
| 9 | (Argentina) Óscar Ustari | Atlas | 3 | 0.71 |
| 9 | (Mexico) Gibrán Lajud | Tijuana | 3 | 1.35 |
| 9 | (Mexico) José de Jesús Corona | Cruz Azul | 3 | 1.38 |
| 9 | (United States) William Yarbrough | León | 3 | 1.42 |
| 9 | (Brazil) Tiago Volpi | Querétaro | 3 | 1.59 |

Source: Fox Sports

==== Saves ====
| Rank | Player | Club | Saves |
|---|---|---|---|
| 1 | (Uruguay) Sebastián Sosa | Morelia | 75 |
| 2 | (Argentina) Marcelo Barovero | Necaxa | 67 |
| 2 | (Mexico) Rodolfo Cota | Guadalajara | 67 |
| 4 | (Brazil) Tiago Volpi | Querétaro | 63 |
| 5 | (Argentina) Nahuel Guzmán | UANL | 58 |
| 5 | (Argentina) Agustín Marchesín | América | 58 |
| 7 | (Mexico) Jonathan Orozco | Santos Laguna | 57 |
| 8 | (Mexico) Alfredo Saldívar | UNAM | 55 |
| 8 | (Mexico) Gibrán Lajud | Tijuana | 55 |
| 10 | (Mexico) Luis Manuel García | Toluca | 54 |
| 10 | (United States) William Yarbrough | León | 54 |

Source: Fox Sports

=== Attendance ===
| Pos | Team | Total | High | Low | Average | Change |
|---|---|---|---|---|---|---|
| 1 | Monterrey | 432,157 | 51,507 | 42,953 | 48,017 | −1.9% |
| 2 | UANL | 330,501 | 41,427 | 41,210 | 41,313 | 0.0% |
| 3 | Atlas | 264,985 | 49,579 | 22,294 | 33,123 | −11.1% |
| 4 | América | 212,385 | 47,532 | 19,081 | 30,341 | −3.3% |
| 5 | Guadalajara | 261,754 | 35,888 | 20,707 | 29,084 | −18.8% |
| 6 | Tijuana | 211,764 | 27,333 | 25,333 | 26,471 | +1.1% |
| 7 | Morelia | 198,285 | 31,134 | 18,099 | 24,786 | −16.9% |
| 8 | Cruz Azul | 180,684 | 27,649 | 17,254 | 22,586 | +7.9% |
| 9 | Pachuca | 196,344 | 25,138 | 15,345 | 21,816 | −14.2% |
| 10 | León | 190,271 | 25,450 | 16,400 | 21,141 | +1.8% |
| 11 | Santos Laguna | 181,766 | 27,849 | 11,956 | 20,196 | −20.4% |
| 12 | Toluca | 194,267 | 27,480 | 12,584 | 19,427 | −15.1% |
| 13 | Querétaro | 164,902 | 21,952 | 13,789 | 18,322 | −20.4% |
| 14 | UNAM | 141,606 | 27,200 | 10,100 | 17,701 | −41.6%^{2} |
| 15 | Veracruz | 115,762 | 18,929 | 11,375 | 14,470 | −18.8% |
| 16 | Necaxa | 121,418 | 17,750 | 7,225 | 13,491 | −20.2% |
| 17 | Puebla | 117,591 | 45,527 | 4,802 | 13,066 | −46.3% |
| 18 | BUAP | 83,164 | 19,283 | 4,651 | 10,396 | +391.3%^{1} |
| | League total | 3,571,757 | 51,507 | 4,651 | 23,345 | −15.9% |

Source: Liga MX
Notes:
Only regular season listed
1: Team played in Ascenso MX last season.
2: UNAM played one home match at Estadio Corregidora

==== Highest and lowest ====
| Highest attendance | | | | | Lowest attendance | | | |
| Week | Home | Score | Away | Attendance | Home | Score | Away | Attendance |
|---|---|---|---|---|---|---|---|---|
| 1 | UANL | 5–0 | Puebla | 41,269 | BUAP | 2–2 | Santos Laguna | 5,815 |
| 2 | Monterrey | 1–0 | Veracruz | 46,130 | Puebla | 1–1 | Morelia | 12,067 |
| 3 | América | 2–1 | UNAM | 45,256 | BUAP | 3–2 | Pachuca | 8,764 |
| 4 | Atlas | 0–1 | América | 49,313 | Puebla | 1–1 | Tijuana | 8,124 |
| 5 | UANL | 2–0 | UNAM | 41,427 | Veracruz | 1–1 | Querétaro | 14,436 |
| 6 | Monterrey | 4–1 | Toluca | 46,496 | Puebla | 0–1 | León | 6,232 |
| 7 | UANL | 3–2 | BUAP | 41,329 | Toluca | 2–1 | Puebla | 12,584 |
| 8 | Monterrey | 1–0 | Necaxa | 50,721 | BUAP | 1–3 | Morelia | 12,623 |
| 9 | Monterrey | 2–1 | Atlas | 47,106 | Necaxa | 1–1 | Puebla | 8,456 |
| 10 | América | 2–1 | Guadalajara | 47,532 | BUAP | 1–2 | Tijuana | 4,651 |
| 11 | Monterrey | 1–1 | Santos Laguna | 42,953 | Puebla | 1–2 | Atlas | 5,127 |
| 12 | UANL | 1–0 | Guadalajara | 41,322 | BUAP | 0–3 | León | 9,464 |
| 13 | Monterrey | 2–0 | Pachuca | 46,888 | Puebla | 2–2 | Querétaro | 4,802 |
| 14 | UANL | 3–0 | Toluca | 41,405 | BUAP | 3–0 | Cruz Azul | 14,230 |
| 15 | Monterrey | 2–0 | América | 51,348 | Puebla | 3–0 | UNAM | 12,481 |
| 16 | UANL | 1–0 | Necaxa | 41,210 | BUAP | 2–1 | Monterrey | 8,334 |
| 17 | Monterrey | 2–0 | UANL | 51,127 | Necaxa | 1–2 | Morelia | 17,750 |

Source: Liga MX

=== Final phase ===
==== Bracket ====
Quarterfinals
1 | Monterrey | 2 | 4 | 6
8 | Atlas | 1 | 1 | 2
4 | Morelia (s) | 1 | 2 | 3
5 | Toluca | 2 | 1 | 3
2 | Tigres UANL (s) | 1 | 1 | 2
7 | León | 1 | 1 | 2
3 | América (s) | 0 | 0 | 0
6 | Cruz Azul | 0 | 0 | 0

Semifinals
1 | Monterrey | 1 | 4 | 5
4 | Morelia | 0 | 0 | 0
2 | Tigres UANL | 1 | 3 | 4
3 | América | 0 | 0 | 0

Finals
1 | Monterrey | 1 | 1 | 2
2 | Tigres UANL | 1 | 2 | 3

- Teams are re-seeded each round.
- Team with more goals on aggregate after two matches advances.
- Away goals rule is applied in the quarterfinals and semifinals, but not the final.
- In the quarterfinals and semifinals, if the two teams are tied on aggregate and away goals, the higher seeded team advances.
- In the final, if the two teams are tied after both legs, the match goes to extra-time and, if necessary, a shootout.
- Both finalists qualify to the 2019 CONCACAF Champions League (champions as MEX1, runners-up as MEX3).

==== Quarterfinals ====
| Team 1 | Agg. | Team 2 | 1st leg | 2nd leg |
|---|---|---|---|---|
| Atlas | 2–6 | Monterrey | 1–2 | 1–4 |
| León | 2–2 | Tigres UANL (s) | 1–1 | 1–1 |
| Cruz Azul | 0–0 | América (s) | 0–0 | 0–0 |
| Toluca | 3–3 | Morelia (s) | 2–1 | 1–2 |

==== Semifinals ====
| Team 1 | Agg. | Team 2 | 1st leg | 2nd leg |
|---|---|---|---|---|
| Morelia | 0–5 | Monterrey | 0–1 | 0–4 |
| América | 0–4 | Tigres UANL | 0–1 | 0–3 |

==== Finals ====
| Team 1 | Agg. | Team 2 | 1st leg | 2nd leg |
|---|---|---|---|---|
| Tigres UANL | 3–2 | Monterrey | 1–1 | 2–1 |

Champions

6th title

== Torneo Clausura ==
The Clausura 2018 is the second championship of the season. The regular phase of the tournament began in January 2018.

=== Regular phase ===
==== League table ====
| Pos | Team | Pld | W | D | L | GF | GA | GD | Pts | Qualification or relegation |
|---|---|---|---|---|---|---|---|---|---|---|
| 1 | Toluca | 17 | 11 | 3 | 3 | 24 | 13 | +11 | 36 | Advance to Liguilla (Note: The first 8 places in the table qualify for the Liguilla, if team last in Relegation table is in the top eight, the ninth placed team qualifies.) |
| 2 | América | 17 | 7 | 8 | 2 | 24 | 14 | +10 | 29 | Advance to Liguilla |
| 3 | Monterrey | 17 | 8 | 5 | 4 | 30 | 21 | +9 | 29 | Advance to Liguilla |
| 4 | Santos Laguna (C) | 17 | 9 | 2 | 6 | 29 | 20 | +9 | 29 | Advance to Liguilla |
| 5 | UANL | 17 | 7 | 7 | 3 | 23 | 16 | +7 | 28 | Advance to Liguilla |
| 6 | Tijuana | 17 | 6 | 7 | 4 | 18 | 12 | +6 | 25 | Advance to Liguilla |
| 7 | UNAM | 17 | 6 | 6 | 5 | 24 | 24 | 0 | 24 | Advance to Liguilla |
| 8 | Morelia | 17 | 7 | 3 | 7 | 22 | 24 | −2 | 24 | Advance to Liguilla |
| 9 | Pachuca | 17 | 6 | 5 | 6 | 29 | 27 | +2 | 23 | |
| 10 | Puebla | 17 | 7 | 2 | 8 | 23 | 24 | −1 | 23 | |
| 11 | Necaxa | 17 | 4 | 10 | 3 | 20 | 14 | +6 | 22 | |
| 12 | Cruz Azul | 17 | 5 | 7 | 5 | 22 | 18 | +4 | 22 | |
| 13 | León | 17 | 6 | 4 | 7 | 24 | 33 | −9 | 22 | |
| 14 | Querétaro | 17 | 4 | 6 | 7 | 13 | 18 | −5 | 18 | |
| 15 | Atlas | 17 | 5 | 3 | 9 | 17 | 26 | −9 | 18 | |
| 16 | Veracruz | 17 | 5 | 3 | 9 | 12 | 25 | −13 | 18 | |
| 17 | Guadalajara | 17 | 3 | 6 | 8 | 14 | 24 | −10 | 15 | |
| 18 | BUAP (R) | 17 | 2 | 3 | 12 | 18 | 33 | −15 | 9 | Relegated to Ascenso MX |

Source: Liga MX
Rules for classification: 1) Points; 2) Goal difference; 3) Number of goals scored; 4) Number of goals scored away; 5) Head-to-head results between tied teams; 6) Highest relegation coefficient; 7) Fair Play points
(C) Champions; (R) Relegated

==== Positions by round ====
The table lists the positions of teams after each week of matches. In order to preserve chronological evolvements, any postponed matches are not included in the round at which they were originally scheduled, but added to the full round they were played immediately afterwards. For example, if a match is scheduled for matchday 13, but then postponed and played between days 16 and 17, it will be added to the standings for day 16.

| Team ╲ Round | 1 | 2 | 3 | 4 | 5 | 6 | 7 | 8 | 9 | 10 | 11 | 12 | 13 | 14 | 15 | 16 | 17 |
|---|---|---|---|---|---|---|---|---|---|---|---|---|---|---|---|---|---|
| Toluca | 9 | 15 | 12 | 11 | 11 | 7 | 10 | 9 | 4 | 3 | 3 | 2 | 1 | 1 | 1 | 1 | 1 |
| América | 5 | 5 | 7 | 4 | 2 | 2 | 1 | 1 | 1 | 2 | 2 | 4 | 4 | 3 | 3 | 5 | 2 |
| Monterrey | 8 | 4 | 6 | 2 | 1 | 3 | 4 | 7 | 3 | 8 | 8 | 6 | 5 | 5 | 5 | 3 | 3 |
| Santos Laguna | 1 | 8 | 3 | 5 | 7 | 4 | 2 | 2 | 2 | 1 | 1 | 1 | 2 | 2 | 2 | 2 | 4 |
| UANL | 15 | 10 | 13 | 6 | 8 | 11 | 11 | 10 | 6 | 4 | 4 | 3 | 3 | 4 | 4 | 4 | 5 |
| Tijuana | 10 | 7 | 8 | 3 | 5 | 9 | 12 | 8 | 10 | 6 | 7 | 8 | 8 | 7 | 7 | 8 | 6 |
| UNAM | 2 | 1 | 1 | 1 | 3 | 1 | 3 | 3 | 5 | 9 | 9 | 9 | 9 | 12 | 10 | 6 | 7 |
| Morelia | 6 | 6 | 14 | 7 | 4 | 5 | 7 | 5 | 11 | 7 | 5 | 5 | 6 | 6 | 6 | 7 | 8 |
| Pachuca | 14 | 12 | 9 | 13 | 14 | 13 | 6 | 11 | 7 | 10 | 11 | 11 | 13 | 8 | 8 | 9 | 9 |
| Puebla | 4 | 11 | 4 | 10 | 6 | 8 | 5 | 4 | 8 | 5 | 6 | 7 | 7 | 11 | 13 | 11 | 10 |
| Necaxa | 12 | 13 | 15 | 12 | 12 | 10 | 9 | 6 | 9 | 12 | 10 | 10 | 10 | 10 | 9 | 10 | 11 |
| Cruz Azul | 13 | 3 | 5 | 9 | 10 | 14 | 15 | 15 | 15 | 15 | 14 | 14 | 16 | 14 | 14 | 12 | 12 |
| León | 3 | 2 | 2 | 8 | 9 | 6 | 8 | 12 | 12 | 11 | 12 | 12 | 15 | 16 | 12 | 13 | 13 |
| Querétaro | 17 | 9 | 10 | 14 | 15 | 12 | 13 | 13 | 13 | 13 | 13 | 13 | 11 | 13 | 15 | 15 | 14 |
| Atlas | 16 | 17 | 17 | 18 | 17 | 18 | 18 | 18 | 18 | 18 | 18 | 18 | 17 | 17 | 17 | 16 | 15 |
| Veracruz | 11 | 16 | 16 | 16 | 13 | 15 | 14 | 14 | 14 | 14 | 16 | 16 | 14 | 9 | 11 | 14 | 16 |
| Guadalajara | 7 | 14 | 11 | 15 | 16 | 16 | 16 | 16 | 17 | 16 | 15 | 15 | 12 | 15 | 16 | 17 | 17 |
| BUAP | 18 | 18 | 18 | 17 | 18 | 17 | 17 | 17 | 16 | 17 | 17 | 17 | 18 | 18 | 18 | 18 | 18 |

| Leader and qualification to playoffs |
| Qualification to playoffs |
| Last place in table |

Source: Liga MX

=== Results ===
| Home \ Away | AMÉ | ATL | BUP | CAZ | GUA | LEÓ | MON | MOR | NEC | PAC | PUE | QUE | SLA | TIJ | TOL | UNL | UNM | VER |
|---|---|---|---|---|---|---|---|---|---|---|---|---|---|---|---|---|---|---|
| América | | 1–0 | 5–1 | 2–1 | | 2–0 | 0–0 | 4–1 | | 2–2 | | | 1–0 | 0–0 | 1–2 | | | |
| Atlas | | | | 2–1 | 1–0 | 1–2 | 0–1 | | 1–1 | | 1–0 | 1–0 | 3–2 | | 1–3 | | | |
| BUAP | | 3–1 | | | 0–1 | | | | 0–1 | | 0–1 | 0–2 | | | 1–2 | 0–0 | 1–1 | 5–0 |
| Cruz Azul | | | 1–0 | | | 0–0 | | 2–0 | 0–2 | 5–0 | 1–1 | 0–1 | | 0–0 | | | 1–1 | |
| Guadalajara | 1–1 | | | 1–3 | | 0–2 | 1–2 | | | 1–1 | | | 0–2 | | | 0–0 | | 0–1 |
| León | | | 2–2 | | | | | 2–3 | 0–4 | | 2–1 | 1–1 | | 1–1 | 3–1 | | 3–0 | |
| Monterrey | | | 4–0 | 2–2 | | 5–1 | | 1–1 | | | 1–3 | 3–1 | | 0–0 | | | 2–1 | |
| Morelia | | 2–1 | 2–1 | | 1–2 | | | | 2–2 | | 1–0 | 1–0 | | | 0–1 | | 1–2 | 2–0 |
| Necaxa | 1–1 | | | | 1–3 | | 3–0 | | | 1–1 | | | 1–2 | | 0–0 | 1–1 | | 0–0 |
| Pachuca | | 0–0 | 3–1 | | | 2–1 | 1–2 | 2–3 | | | | | 3–1 | 2–0 | 2–1 | | 2–3 | |
| Puebla | 3–1 | | | | 2–0 | | | | 1–1 | 2–6 | | | 0–1 | | 2–0 | 2–1 | | 2–0 |
| Querétaro | 0–1 | | | | 2–2 | | | | 1–1 | 0–0 | 2–1 | | | | 0–2 | 0–0 | | 0–1 |
| Santos Laguna | | | 4–2 | 2–0 | | 5–1 | 3–2 | 1–0 | | | | 3–0 | | 0–0 | | | 1–2 | |
| Tijuana | | 2–2 | 3–1 | | 3–0 | | | 1–1 | 1–0 | | 2–0 | 0–2 | | | 1–0 | | 4–1 | |
| Toluca | | | | 1–1 | 1–1 | | 2–1 | | | 2–1 | | | 2–0 | | | 1–0 | | 3–0 |
| UANL | 1–1 | 2–0 | | 2–2 | | 4–1 | 2–2 | 2–1 | | 3–2 | | | 2–1 | 1–0 | | | | |
| UNAM | 0–0 | 3–1 | | | 1–1 | | | | | | 4–2 | 1–1 | | | 0–1 | 2–0 | | 1–2 |
| Veracruz | 1–1 | 3–1 | | 1–2 | | 1–2 | 0–2 | | | 0–1 | | | 1–1 | 1–0 | | 0–2 | | |

Updated to match(es) played on 29 April 2018. Source: Liga MX
Legend: Blue = home team win; Yellow = draw; Red = away team win.

=== Top goalscorers ===
Players sorted first by goals scored, then by last name.

| Rank | Player | Club | Goals |
|---|---|---|---|
| 1 | (Cape Verde) Djaniny | Santos Laguna | 14 |
| 2 | (Chile) Nicolás Castillo | UNAM | 11 |
| 3 | (Argentina) Mauro Boselli | León | 9 |
| 3 | (Canada) Lucas Cavallini | Puebla | 9 |
| 3 | (Paraguay) Carlos González | Necaxa | 9 |
| 3 | (France) André-Pierre Gignac | UANL | 9 |
| 3 | (Peru) Raúl Ruidíaz | Morelia | 9 |
| 8 | (Argentina) Milton Caraglio | Atlas | 8 |
| 8 | (Colombia) Julián Quiñones | BUAP | 8 |
| 10 | (Japan) Keisuke Honda | Pachuca | 7 |
| 10 | (Argentina) Sebastián Palacios | Pachuca | 7 |

Source: Liga MX

==== Hat-tricks ====
| Player | For | Against | Result | Date |
|---|---|---|---|---|
| (Cape Verde) Djaniny | Santos Laguna | BUAP | 4–2 | 7 January 2018 |
| (Mexico) Henry Martín | América | BUAP | 5–1 | 3 February 2018 |
| (Cape Verde) Djaniny | Santos Laguna | León | 5–1 | 14 February 2018 |
| (Argentina) Sebastián Palacios^{4} | Pachuca | Puebla | 6–2 | 6 April 2018 |
| (Peru) Raúl Ruidíaz | Morelia | León | 3–2 | 7 April 2018 |
| (Chile) Nicolas Castillo | UNAM | Puebla | 4–2 | 15 April 2018 |

^{4} Player scored four goals

==== Clean sheets ====
| Rank | Player | Club | Clean sheets | Avg. |
|---|---|---|---|---|
| 1 | (Mexico) Gibrán Lajud | Tijuana | 8 | 0.71 |
| 2 | (Argentina) Agustín Marchesín | América | 7 | 0.82 |
| 3 | (Mexico) Alfredo Talavera | Toluca | 6 | 0.50 |
| 3 | (Argentina) Marcelo Barovero | Necaxa | 6 | 0.88 |
| 3 | (Argentina) Nahuel Guzmán | UANL | 6 | 0.94 |
| 6 | (Mexico) José de Jesús Corona | Cruz Azul | 5 | 1.06 |
| 6 | (Brazil) Tiago Volpi | Querétaro | 5 | 1.06 |
| 6 | (Mexico) Jonathan Orozco | Santos Laguna | 5 | 1.18 |
| 9 | (Mexico) Alfonso Blanco | Pachuca | 4 | 1.59 |
| 10 | (Mexico) José Hernández | Atlas | 3 | 0.80 |
| 10 | (Mexico) Hugo González | Monterrey | 3 | 1.21 |
| 10 | (Mexico) Moisés Muñoz | Puebla | 3 | 1.36 |
| 10 | (Uruguay) Sebastián Sosa | Morelia | 3 | 1.41 |
| 10 | (United States) William Yarbrough | León | 3 | 1.73 |

Source: Fox Sports

==== Saves ====
| Rank | Player | Club | Saves |
|---|---|---|---|
| 1 | (Brazil) Tiago Volpi | Querétaro | 82 |
| 2 | (Mexico) Alfredo Saldívar | UNAM | 72 |
| 3 | (Uruguay) Sebastián Sosa | Morelia | 67 |
| 4 | (Mexico) Gibrán Lajud | Tijuana | 66 |
| 5 | (Mexico) Alfonso Blanco | Pachuca | 65 |
| 6 | (Mexico) José de Jesús Corona | Cruz Azul | 56 |
| 7 | (United States) William Yarbrough | León | 55 |
| 8 | (Mexico) Rodolfo Cota | Guadalajara | 54 |
| 9 | (Argentina) Nahuel Guzmán | UANL | 47 |
| 10 | (Argentina) Marcelo Barovero | Necaxa | 46 |
| 10 | (Mexico) Moisés Muñoz | Puebla | 46 |

Source: Fox Sports

=== Attendance ===
| Pos | Team | Total | High | Low | Average | Change |
|---|---|---|---|---|---|---|
| 1 | Monterrey | 342,717 | 44,819 | 40,197 | 42,840 | −10.8% |
| 2 | UANL | 372,186 | 41,615 | 41,185 | 41,354 | +0.1% |
| 3 | Guadalajara | 256,685 | 39,855 | 20,793 | 32,086 | +10.3% |
| 4 | Atlas | 276,182 | 46,565 | 18,087 | 30,687 | −7.4% |
| 5 | UNAM | 273,620 | 45,980 | 17,800 | 30,402 | +71.8% |
| 6 | América | 274,232 | 51,307 | 17,840 | 27,423 | −9.6% |
| 7 | Tijuana | 239,697 | 27,333 | 25,333 | 26,633 | +0.6% |
| 8 | Pachuca | 192,600 | 27,402 | 15,194 | 24,075 | +10.4% |
| 9 | Toluca | 165,556 | 27,480 | 17,285 | 23,651 | +21.7% |
| 10 | Santos Laguna | 187,558 | 27,349 | 20,796 | 23,445 | +16.1% |
| 11 | Querétaro | 181,206 | 31,432 | 16,446 | 22,651 | +23.6% |
| 12 | Morelia | 193,329 | 28,952 | 15,199 | 21,481 | −13.3% |
| 13 | Veracruz | 190,845 | 27,013 | 12,259 | 21,205 | +46.5% |
| 14 | Necaxa | 157,574 | 23,165 | 12,535 | 19,697 | +46.0% |
| 15 | Puebla | 157,448 | 37,499 | 13,025 | 19,681 | +50.6% |
| 16 | Cruz Azul | 164,631 | 27,253 | 11,085 | 18,292 | −19.0% |
| 17 | León | 135,798 | 19,228 | 13,074 | 16,975 | −19.7% |
| 18 | BUAP | 119,413 | 19,145 | 7,183 | 13,268 | +27.6% |
| | League total | 3,881,277 | 51,307 | 7,183 | 25,368 | +8.7% |

Source: Liga MX
Notes:
Only regular season listed.

==== Highest and lowest ====
| Highest attendance | | | | | Lowest attendance | | | |
| Week | Home | Score | Away | Attendance | Home | Score | Away | Attendance |
|---|---|---|---|---|---|---|---|---|
| 1 | Monterrey | 1–1 | Morelia | 42,948 | Necaxa | 0–0 | Veracruz | 12,535 |
| 2 | UANL | 2–1 | Santos Laguna | 41,396 | BUAP | 0–2 | Querétaro | 7,300 |
| 3 | UNAM | 0–0 | América | 45,980 | Puebla | 2–0 | Veracruz | 17,116 |
| 4 | UANL | 3–2 | Pachuca | 41,268 | Veracruz | 1–1 | Santos Laguna | 12,259 |
| 5 | Monterrey | 5–1 | León | 44,562 | América | 5–1 | BUAP | 18,282 |
| 6 | UANL | 1–1 | América | 41,478 | BUAP | 3–1 | Atlas | 7,183 |
| 7 | Monterrey | 2–2 | Cruz Azul | 40,197 | BUAP | 0–0 | UANL | 10,237 |
| 8 | UANL | 2–0 | Atlas | 41,185 | Cruz Azul | 1–1 | Puebla | 12,187 |
| 9 | UNAM | 1–1 | Guadalajara | 43,825 | Puebla | 1–1 | Necaxa | 17,717 |
| 10 | Guadalajara | 1–1 | América | 42,179 | Cruz Azul | 0–1 | Querétaro | 11,085 |
| 11 | UANL | 1–0 | Tijuana | 41,304 | Querétaro | 1–1 | Necaxa | 18,001 |
| 12 | Monterrey | 3–1 | Querétaro | 41,072 | León | 2–2 | BUAP | 13,175 |
| 13 | América | 2–1 | Cruz Azul | 51,307 | BUAP | 1–2 | Toluca | 10,826 |
| 14 | Monterrey | 2–1 | UNAM | 44,306 | Puebla | 2–6 | Pachuca | 13,646 |
| 15 | UANL | 2–2 | Cruz Azul | 41,228 | UNAM | 4–2 | Puebla | 17,800 |
| 16 | Atlas | 1–0 | Guadalajara | 46,565 | Querétaro | 0–0 | Pachuca | 16,446 |
| 17 | UANL | 2–2 | Monterrey | 41,615 | BUAP | 0–1 | Puebla | 10,876 |

Source: Liga MX

=== Final phase ===
==== Bracket ====
Quarterfinals
1 | Toluca (s) | 2 | 2 | 4
8 | Morelia | 2 | 2 | 4
3 | Monterrey | 1 | 1 | 2
6 | Tijuana | 1 | 2 | 3
2 | América | 4 | 2 | 6
7 | UNAM | 1 | 1 | 2
4 | Santos Laguna (s) | 0 | 2 | 2
5 | UANL | 2 | 0 | 2

Semifinals
1 | Toluca | 1 | 4 | 5
6 | Tijuana | 2 | 1 | 3
2 | América | 1 | 2 | 3
4 | Santos Laguna | 4 | 2 | 6

Finals
1 | Toluca | 1 | 1 | 2
4 | Santos Laguna | 2 | 1 | 3

- Teams are re-seeded each round.
- Team with more goals on aggregate after two matches advances.
- Away goals rule is applied in the quarterfinals and semifinals, but not the final.
- In the quarterfinals and semifinals, if the two teams are tied on aggregate and away goals, the higher seeded team advances.
- In the final, if the two teams are tied after both legs, the match goes to extra-time and, if necessary, a shootout.
- Both finalists qualify to the 2019 CONCACAF Champions League (champions as MEX2, runners-up as MEX4).

==== Quarterfinals ====
| Team 1 | Agg. | Team 2 | 1st leg | 2nd leg |
|---|---|---|---|---|
| Morelia | 4–4 | Toluca (s) | 2–2 | 2–2 |
| UNAM | 2–6 | América | 1–4 | 1–2 |
| Tijuana | 3–2 | Monterrey | 1–1 | 2–1 |
| UANL | 2–2 | Santos Laguna (s) | 2–0 | 0–2 |

==== Semifinals ====
| Team 1 | Agg. | Team 2 | 1st leg | 2nd leg |
|---|---|---|---|---|
| Tijuana | 3–5 | Toluca | 2–1 | 1–4 |
| Santos Laguna | 6–3 | América | 4–1 | 2–2 |

==== Finals ====
| Team 1 | Agg. | Team 2 | 1st leg | 2nd leg |
|---|---|---|---|---|
| Santos Laguna | 3–2 | Toluca | 2–1 | 1–1 |

== Relegation table ==
| Pos | Team | '15 A Pts | '16 C Pts | '16 A Pts | '17 C Pts | '17 A Pts | '18 C Pts | Total Pts | Total Pld | Avg | GD | Relegation |
|---|---|---|---|---|---|---|---|---|---|---|---|---|
| 1 | Monterrey | 23 | 37 | 25 | 27 | 37 | 29 | 178 | 102 | 1.7451 | +26 | Safe for 2018–19 Season |
| 2 | Toluca | 32 | 22 | 24 | 27 | 29 | 33 | 170 | 102 | 1.6667 | +14 | Safe for 2018–19 Season |
| 3 | América | 28 | 29 | 28 | 24 | 30 | 29 | 168 | 102 | 1.6471 | +15 | Safe for 2018–19 Season |
| 4 | Tigres | 28 | 24 | 30 | 25 | 32 | 28 | 167 | 102 | 1.6373 | +19 | Safe for 2018–19 Season |
| 5 | León | 30 | 30 | 26 | 20 | 26 | 22 | 154 | 102 | 1.5098 | –5 | Safe for 2018–19 Season |
| 6 | Morelia | 23 | 28 | 20 | 24 | 29 | 24 | 148 | 102 | 1.4510 | +6 | Safe for 2018–19 Season |
| 7 | Pachuca | 21 | 30 | 31 | 24 | 19 | 23 | 148 | 102 | 1.4510 | 0 | Safe for 2018–19 Season |
| 8 | Tijuana | 16 | 18 | 33 | 31 | 21 | 25 | 144 | 102 | 1.4118 | 0 | Safe for 2018–19 Season |
| 9 | Necaxa | Ascenso MX | | 26 | 21 | 24 | 22 | 93 | 68 | 1.3676 | +10 | Safe for 2018–19 Season |
| 10 | Pumas | 35 | 22 | 27 | 18 | 13 | 24 | 139 | 102 | 1.3627 | –11 | Safe for 2018–19 Season |
| 11 | Guadalajara | 21 | 28 | 28 | 27 | 18 | 15 | 137 | 102 | 1.3431 | –12 | Safe for 2018–19 Season |
| 12 | Santos Laguna | 17 | 27 | 16 | 26 | 18 | 29 | 133 | 102 | 1.3039 | +6 | Safe for 2018–19 Season |
| 13 | Cruz Azul | 20 | 22 | 19 | 21 | 27 | 22 | 131 | 102 | 1.2843 | +4 | Safe for 2018–19 Season |
| 14 | Puebla | 27 | 22 | 20 | 16 | 16 | 23 | 125 | 102 | 1.2157 | –7 | Safe for 2018–19 Season |
| 15 | Atlas | 17 | 14 | 19 | 26 | 25 | 18 | 119 | 102 | 1.1667 | –5 | Safe for 2018–19 Season |
| 16 | Querétaro | 22 | 19 | 20 | 19 | 16 | 18 | 114 | 102 | 1.1176 | –13 | Safe for 2018–19 Season |
| 17 | Veracruz | 27 | 14 | 12 | 21 | 14 | 18 | 106 | 102 | 1.0392 | –27 | Safe for 2018–19 Season |
| 18 | BUAP (R) | Ascenso MX | | | | 23 | 9 | 32 | 34 | 0.9412 | –20 | Relegated to Ascenso MX |

Rules for relegation: 1) Relegation coefficient; 2) Goal difference; 3) Number of goals scored; 4) Head-to-head results between tied teams; 5) Number of goals scored away; 6) Fair Play points
R = Relegated.
Source: LigaMX

== Aggregate table ==
The aggregate table (the sum of points of both the Apertura and Clausura tournaments) will be used to determine the participants of the Apertura 2018 Copa MX. This table also displays teams that have qualified for the 2019 CONCACAF Champions League.

| Pos | Team | Pld | W | D | L | GF | GA | GD | Pts | Qualification or relegation |
|---|---|---|---|---|---|---|---|---|---|---|
| 1 | Monterrey | 34 | 19 | 9 | 6 | 59 | 33 | +26 | 66 | Copa MX Pot 1 CONCACAF Champions League |
| 2 | Toluca | 34 | 19 | 8 | 7 | 48 | 34 | +14 | 65 | Copa MX Pot 1 CONCACAF Champions League |
| 3 | UANL | 34 | 16 | 12 | 6 | 51 | 32 | +19 | 60 | Copa MX Pot 1 CONCACAF Champions League |
| 4 | América | 34 | 16 | 11 | 7 | 47 | 32 | +15 | 59 | Copa MX Pot 1 |
| 5 | Morelia | 34 | 15 | 8 | 11 | 47 | 41 | +6 | 53 | Copa MX Pot 2 |
| 6 | Cruz Azul | 34 | 12 | 13 | 9 | 44 | 40 | +4 | 49 | Copa MX Pot 2 |
| 7 | León | 34 | 14 | 6 | 14 | 51 | 56 | −5 | 48 | Copa MX Pot 2 |
| 8 | Santos Laguna | 34 | 12 | 11 | 11 | 49 | 43 | +6 | 47 | Copa MX Pot 2 CONCACAF Champions League |
| 9 | Necaxa (Note: Necaxa is in Pot 1 due to winning the Clausura 2018 Copa MX) | 34 | 10 | 16 | 8 | 39 | 29 | +10 | 46 | Copa MX Pot 1 |
| 10 | Tijuana | 34 | 12 | 10 | 12 | 35 | 35 | 0 | 46 | Copa MX Pot 3 |
| 11 | Atlas | 34 | 12 | 7 | 15 | 40 | 45 | −5 | 43 | Copa MX Pot 3 |
| 12 | Pachuca | 34 | 11 | 9 | 14 | 52 | 52 | 0 | 42 | Copa MX Pot 3 |
| 13 | Puebla | 34 | 10 | 9 | 15 | 37 | 44 | −7 | 39 | Copa MX Pot 3 |
| 14 | UNAM | 34 | 9 | 10 | 15 | 38 | 49 | −11 | 37 | Copa MX Pot 3 |
| 15 | Querétaro | 34 | 7 | 13 | 14 | 32 | 45 | −13 | 34 | Copa MX Pot 3 |
| 16 | Guadalajara | 34 | 7 | 12 | 15 | 35 | 47 | −12 | 33 | Copa MX Pot 3 |
| 17 | BUAP (Note: BUAP is ineligible for Copa MX) | 34 | 9 | 5 | 20 | 44 | 64 | −20 | 32 | |
| 18 | Veracruz | 34 | 9 | 5 | 20 | 26 | 53 | −27 | 32 | Copa MX Pot 3 |

Source: Liga MX
Rules for classification: 1) Points; 2) Goal difference; 3) Number of goals scored; 4) Number of goals scored away; 5) Head-to-head results between tied teams; 6) Highest relegation coefficient; 7) Fair Play points

== See also ==
- 2017–18 Liga MX Femenil season
- 2017–18 Ascenso MX season
