= List of Copa Sudamericana top scorers =

The Copa Sudamericana is an annual football cup competition organized by CONMEBOL since 2002 for football club in South American.

Miller Bolaños is the only player to have finished as the Copa Sudamericana top scorer multiple times, having done so in 2014 and 2015. Argentine players have been the top scorer ten times, the most of any country. Cameroonian Pierre Webó is the only non-South American to have finished as top scorer, doing so in 2002. The most goals in a single edition was achieved by Eduardo Vargas, who scored eleven goals in 2011.

== Top scorers by season ==
Season	Player(s)	Nationality	Club(s)	Goals
2002	Rodrigo Astudillo	Argentina	(Argentina) San Lorenzo	4
2002	Gonzalo Galindo	Bolivia	(Bolivia) Bolívar	4
2002	Pierre Webó	Cameroon	(Uruguay) Nacional	4
2003	Germán Carty	Peru	(Peru) Cienciano	6
2004	Horacio Chiorazzo	Argentina	(Bolivia) Bolívar	5
2005	Bruno Marioni	Argentina	(Mexico) Pumas UNAM	7
2006	Humberto Suazo	Chile	(Chile) Colo-Colo	10
2007	Ricardo Ciciliano	Colombia	(Colombia) Millonarios	6
2008	Alex	Brazil	(Brazil) Internacional	5
2008	Nilmar	Brazil	(Brazil) Internacional	5
2009	Claudio Bieler	Argentina	(Ecuador) LDU Quito	8
2010	Rafael Moura	Brazil	(Brazil) Goiás	8
2011	Eduardo Vargas	Chile	Universidad de Chile	11
2012	Jonathan Fabbro	Paraguay	(Paraguay) Cerro Porteño	5
2012	Carlos Núñez	Uruguay	(Uruguay) Liverpool	5
2012	Fábio Renato	Brazil	(Ecuador) LDU Loja	5
2012	Wason Rentería	Colombia	(Colombia) Millonarios	5
2012	Michael Ríos	Chile	(Chile) Universidad Católica	5
2013	Enner Valencia	Ecuador	(Ecuador) Emelec	5
2014	Miller Bolaños	Ecuador	(Ecuador) Emelec	5
2014	Andrés Vilches	Chile	(Chile) Huachipato	5
2015	Ramón Ábila	Argentina	(Argentina) Huracán	5
2015	Miller Bolaños	Ecuador	(Ecuador) Emelec	5
2015	Wilson Morelo	Colombia	(Colombia) Santa Fe	5
2015	José Ariel Núñez	Paraguay	(Paraguay) Olimpia	5
2016	Miguel Borja	Colombia	(Colombia) Atlético Nacional	6
2016	Cecilio Domínguez	Paraguay	(Paraguay) Cerro Porteño	6
2017	Jhon Cifuente	Ecuador	(Ecuador) Universidad Católica	5
2017	Pulga Rodríguez	Argentina	(Argentina) Atlético Tucumán	5
2017	Felipe Vizeu	Brazil	(Brazil) Flamengo	5
2018	Nicolás Benedetti	Colombia	(Colombia) Deportivo Cali	5
2018	Pablo	Brazil	(Brazil) Athletico Paranaense	5
2019	Silvio Romero	Argentina	(Argentina) Independiente	5
2020	Braian Romero	Argentina	(Argentina) Defensa y Justicia	10
2021	Agustín Álvarez	Uruguay	(Uruguay) Peñarol	10
2022	Bernardo Cuesta	Argentina	(Peru) Melgar	8
2023	Gonzalo Mastriani	Uruguay	(Brazil) América Mineiro	9
2024	Adrián Martínez	Argentina	(Argentina) Racing	10
2025	Dayro Moreno	Colombia	(Colombia) Once Caldas	10
