= Miller Bolaños =

Ecuadorian footballer (born 1990)

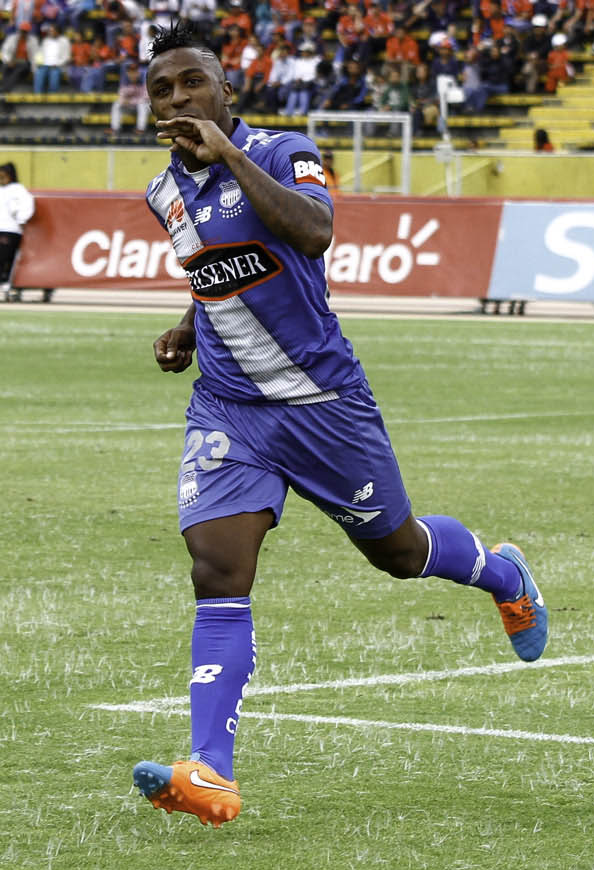
- Bolaños celebrating for Emelec in 2015

Personal information
- Full name: Miller Alejandro Bolaños Reasco
- Date of birth: 1 June 1990 (age 36)
- Place of birth: Esmeraldas, Ecuador
- Height: 1.70 m (5 ft 7 in)
- Position: Striker

Team information
- Current team: Guayaquil City
- Number: 23

Youth career
- 2003–2006: Caribe Junior

Senior career*
Years	Team	Apps	(Gls)
2006–2008	Barcelona SC	37	(4)
2009–2013	LDU Quito	80	(18)
2012–2013	→ Chivas USA (loan)	29	(3)
2013–2015	→ Emelec (loan)	76	(44)
2016–2017	Grêmio	20	(3)
2017–2020	Tijuana	90	(20)
2020–2022	Shanghai Shenhua	11	(3)
2021	→ Chongqing Liangjiang Athletic (loan)	12	(2)
2023	Emelec	15	(8)
2024–2025	Guayaquil City	60	(22)
2026	Emelec	6	(1)
2026–	Guayaquil City	13	(3)

International career^{‡}
2007	Ecuador U17		
2015–2018	Ecuador	25	(8)
- * Club domestic league appearances and goals as of 31 December 2022 ‡ National team caps and goals as of 20 November 2018

Miller Alejandro Bolaños Reasco (born 1 June 1990) is an Ecuadorian footballer who plays as a striker for Ecuadorian Serie A club Guayaquil City.

== Club career ==
=== LDU Quito ===
Bolaños was born in Esmeraldas, and began his career in the youth ranks of Caribe Junior. In 2006, he joined Barcelona SC and made his professional debut the same year. In 2009 the promising forward was transferred to LDU Quito. On 29 August 2009 in a 4–0 win over LDU Portoviejo, Bolaños scored the 2,500th goal in LDU Quito's history. He was an important player for LDU Quito during the most glorious period of the club's history as he helped the Ecuadorian club capture the 2010 Serie A title, 2009 Copa Sudamericana, and the 2009 and 2010 Recopa Sudamericana.

==== Loan to Chivas USA ====
On 11 January 2012, it was announced that Bolaños would be joining Chivas USA in Major League Soccer, accompanying compatriot Oswaldo Minda. On 18 July, he scored his first MLS goal against the Portland Timbers at The Home Depot Center, finishing a Ryan Smith pass for the only goal of the game in the 16th minute.

==== Loan to Emelec ====
Miller joined Emelec by loan on the summer of 2013. Though Miller only played 5 league games, he won the 2013 Ecuadorian Serie A season. Miller scored 19 league-goals in 36 games, including 2 goals in the season final match against club-rivals Barcelona SC, winning the 2014 Ecuadorian Serie A. Miller Bolaños became top scorer in the 2014 Copa Sudamericana with 5 goals. During the 2013 season he noticeably formed a successful striking partnership with Denis Stracqualursi which was known affectionately as Straq-Bol by Emelec fans. This was a play on words of Spag-Bol, the Italian pasta dish.

=== Grêmio ===
On 7 February 2016, it was confirmed that Miller would play for Grêmio.

== International career ==
Bolaños represented Ecuador at various youth levels. He participated in the 2007 South American Under-17 Football Championship, helping Ecuador to a 5–4 victory over Brazil.

Bolaños made his debut for Ecuador on 28 March 2015 in a match against Mexico, playing all 90 minutes of the game. Three days later he went on to score his first goal, equalising in a 2–1 friendly loss to Argentina in New Jersey.

Bolaños was selected for the 2015 Copa América in Chile, his first major international tournament. In the opening game against the hosts at the Estadio Nacional, he fouled Arturo Vidal, who consequently scored the first goal of the tournament from the penalty spot as his team defeated Ecuador 2–0. In the second match, he scored from outside the penalty area, albeit in a 3–2 defeat against Bolivia. In the third match in Rancagua, he opened the scoring in a 2–1 victory over Mexico which eliminated the opponents, also setting up the second for Enner Valencia.

== Personal life ==
His older brother is Álex Bolaños, also a midfielder. He too represented Barcelona and LDU among others, and played internationally for their country.

== Career statistics ==
=== Club ===
As of match played 29 October 2025

Appearances and goals by club, season and competition
Club	Season	League			State league		Cup		Continental		Other		Total	
Club	Season	Division	Apps	Goals	Apps	Goals	Apps	Goals	Apps	Goals	Apps	Goals	Apps	Goals
Barcelona SC	2006	Serie A	7	0	—		—		—		—		7	0
Barcelona SC	2007	Serie A	15	3	—		—		—		—		15	3
Barcelona SC	2008	Serie A	15	1	—		—		—		—		15	1
Barcelona SC	Total		37	4	—		—		—		—		37	4
LDU Quito	2009	Serie A	35	6	—		—		7	1	—		42	7
LDU Quito	2010	Serie A	24	9	—		—		7	1	—		31	10
LDU Quito	2011	Serie A	21	3	—		—		9	1	—		30	4
LDU Quito	Total		80	18	—		—		23	3	—		103	21
Chivas USA	2012	MLS	24	3	—		1	0	—		—		25	3
Chivas USA	2013	MLS	5	0	—		1	1	—		—		6	0
Chivas USA	Total		29	3	—		2	0	—		—		31	3
Emelec	2013	Serie A	6	0	—		—		3	1	—		9	1
Emelec	2014	Serie A	36	19	—		—		12	5	—		48	24
Emelec	2015	Serie A	34	25	—		—		14	11	—		48	36
Emelec	Total		76	44	—		—		29	17	—		105	61
Grêmio	2016	Série A	18	3	3	1	3	2	3	1	1	0	28	7
Grêmio	2017	Série A	2	0	12	7	0	0	3	1	1	0	18	8
Grêmio	Total		20	3	15	8	3	2	6	2	2	0	46	15
Tijuana	2017–18	Liga MX	28	9	—		1	0	4	0	—		33	9
Tijuana	2018–19	Liga MX	32	9	—		9	1	1	0	—		42	10
Tijuana	2019–20	Liga MX	26	1	—		7	1	1	0	—		34	2
Tijuana	2020–21	Liga MX	4	1	—		—		—		—		4	1
Tijuana	Total		90	20	—		17	2	5	0	—		113	22
Shanghai Shenhua	2020	Chinese Super League	4	3	—		0	0	0	0	—		4	3
Shanghai Shenhua	2022	Chinese Super League	7	0	—		0	0	—		—		7	0
Shanghai Shenhua	Total		11	3	—		0	0	0	0	—		11	3
Chongqing Liangjiang Athletic (loan)	2021	Chinese Super League	12	2	—		0	0	—		—		12	2
Emelec	2023	Serie A	15	8	—		—		6	3	—		21	11
Guayaquil City	2024	Serie B	31	10	—		4	0	—		—		35	10
Guayaquil City	2025	Serie B	29	12	—		2	1	—		—		31	13
Guayaquil City	Total		60	22	—		6	1	—		—		66	23
Career total			450	127	15	8	28	5	69	25	12	0	564	165

=== International ===
As of 20 November 2018

Appearances and goals by national team and year
National team	Year	Apps	Goals
Ecuador	2015	12	6
Ecuador	2016	7	2
Ecuador	2017	1	0
Ecuador	2018	5	0
Total		25	8

Scores and results list Ecuador's goal tally first, score column indicates score after each Bolaños goal.

List of international goals scored by Miller Bolaños
No.	Date	Venue	Opponent	Score	Result	Competition
1	1 April 2015	MetLife Stadium, East Rutherford, United States	Argentina	1–1	1–2	Friendly
2	6 June 2015	Estadio George Capwell, Guayaquil, Ecuador	Panama	1–0	4–0	Friendly
3	15 June 2015	Estadio Elías Figueroa Brander, Valparaíso, Chile	Bolivia	2–3	2–3	2015 Copa América
4	19 June 2015	Estadio El Teniente, Rancagua, Chile	Mexico	1–0	2–1	2015 Copa América
5	8 September 2015	Estadio Olímpico Atahualpa, Quito, Ecuador	Honduras	2–0	2–0	Friendly
6	13 October 2015	Estadio Olímpico Atahualpa, Quito, Ecuador	Bolivia	1–0	2–0	2018 FIFA World Cup qualification
7	8 June 2016	University of Phoenix, Glendale, United States	Peru	2–2	2–2	Copa América Centenario
8	15 November 2016	Estadio Olímpico Atahualpa, Quito, Ecuador	Venezuela	2–0	3–0	2018 FIFA World Cup qualification

== Honours ==
LDU Quito

- Ecuadorian Serie A: 2010
- Copa Sudamericana: 2009; runner-up: 2011
- Recopa Sudamericana: 2009, 2010

Emelec

- Ecuadorian Serie A: 2013, 2014, 2015

Gremio

- Copa do Brasil: 2016

Individual

- Ecuadorian Serie A Best Player: 2014, 2015
- Ecuadorian Serie A top scorer: 2015
- Ecuadorian Serie A assist leader: 2015
- Copa Sudamericana top scorer: 2014, 2015
