= Enner Valencia =

Ecuadorian footballer (born 1989)

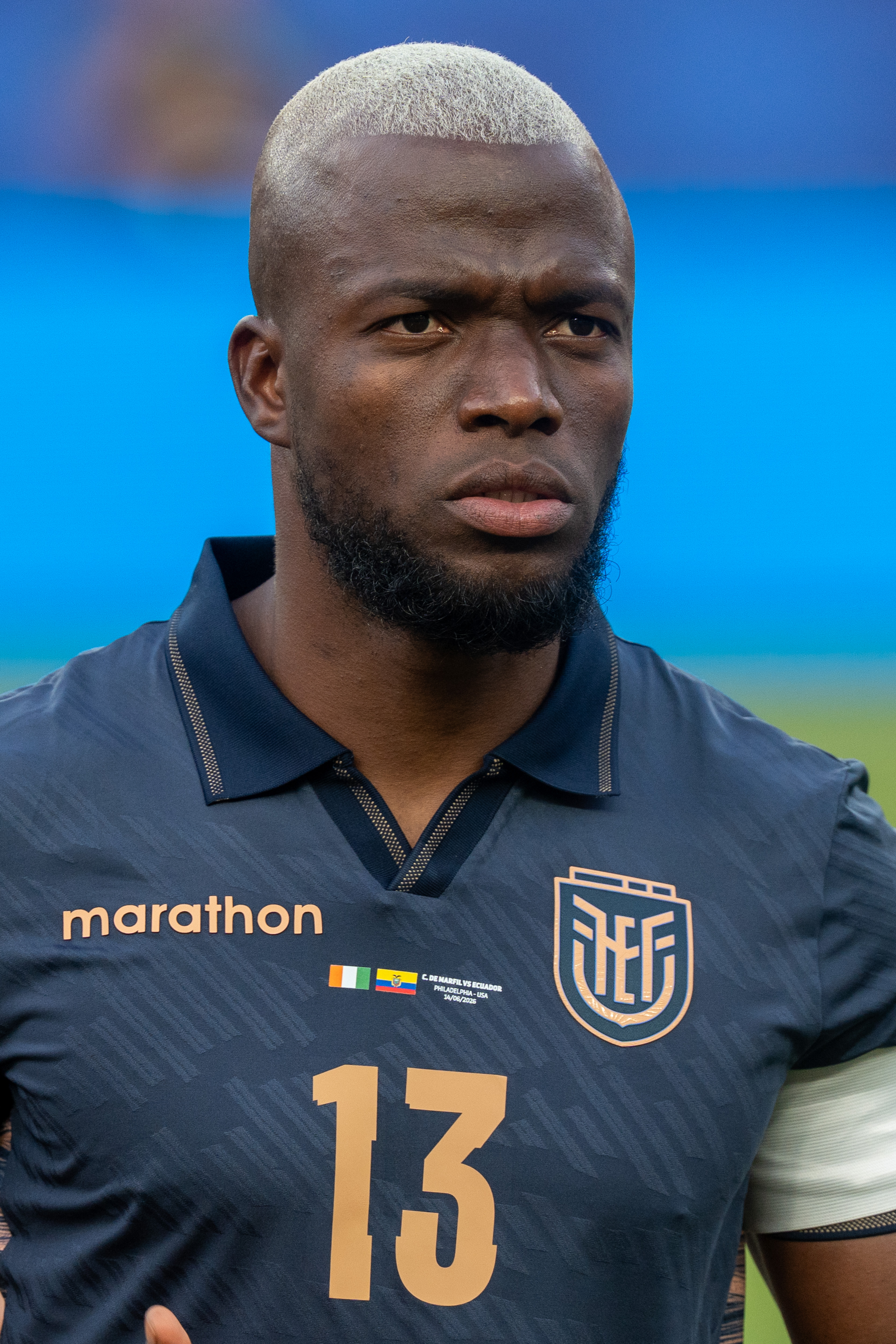
- Valencia with Ecuador in 2026

Personal information
- Full name: Enner Remberto Valencia Lastra
- Date of birth: 4 November 1989 (age 37)
- Place of birth: San Lorenzo, Ecuador
- Height: 1.77 m (5 ft 10 in)
- Positions: Forward; winger

Team information
- Current team: Boca Juniors
- Number: 30

Youth career
- 2005–2008: Caribe Junior
- 2008–2010: Emelec

Senior career*
Years	Team	Apps	(Gls)
2010–2013	Emelec	130	(27)
2014	Pachuca	23	(18)
2014–2017	West Ham United	54	(8)
2016–2017	→ Everton (loan)	21	(3)
2017–2020	Tigres UANL	95	(21)
2020–2023	Fenerbahçe	90	(48)
2023–2025	Internacional	81	(22)
2025–2026	Pachuca	22	(8)
2026–	Boca Juniors	10	(4)

International career^{‡}
2012–2026	Ecuador	109	(49)
- * Club domestic league appearances and goals as of 22:41, 7 November 2026 (UTC) ‡ National team caps and goals as of 04:09, 1 July 2026

Enner Remberto Valencia Lastra (born 4 November 1989) is an Ecuadorian professional footballer who plays as a forward for Argentine Primera División club Boca Juniors.

Valencia previously played for Emelec in Ecuador, where he won the 2013 Ecuadorian Serie A and was awarded the Copa Sudamericana Golden Boot in 2013. He also played for Pachuca in Mexico, being awarded the Liga MX Golden Boot in the 2014 Clausura tournament. He joined English club West Ham United for an estimated £12 million in July 2014, almost breaking the club's signing record. In August 2016, Valencia went out on loan to Everton for the season, before being sold to Mexican club Tigres UANL in July 2017. At Tigres, he won Liga MX's 2017 Apertura and 2019 Clausura tournaments, and finished runner-up in the 2019 CONCACAF Champions League, winning the latter competition's Golden Boot. In August 2020, Valencia signed for Fenerbahçe in Turkey and won the Turkish Cup in his final season, before joining Brazilian club Internacional in mid-2023.

At the international level, Valencia earned over 100 caps for Ecuador between his debut in 2012 and 2026. He represented the nation at the FIFA World Cup in 2014, 2022 and 2026, and the Copa América in 2015, 2016, 2019, 2021 and 2024. Widely regarded as one of the best Ecuadorian players of all time, Valencia is Ecuador's all-time top scorer with 49 goals, and has also scored a record six World Cup goals for his national team.

== Club career ==
=== Emelec ===
Enner Valencia came to Guayaquil to trial for Emelec in 2008 from Caribe Junior's youth system, the same team where Ecuador star Antonio Valencia played in his early years. In 2008, he was transferred to Emelec. From 2008 to early 2010 he received no opportunities in the first team, but with the arrival of the Argentinian coach Jorge Sampaoli, Valencia started to receive playtime opportunities. Emelec were runners-up to champions L.D.U. Quito, losing 2–1 on aggregate score.

Valencia scored nine league goals in 30 league matches in 2011. In November 2012, he scored five goals in five separate matches against El Nacional, LDU Loja, Técnico Universitario, and twice against Manta in both home and away matches, winning four of the five matches, only drawing against LDU Loja. This brought his goal tally to 13 goals scored in 40 league matches played, his best season yet, but for a third season in a row, the team was runner-up to league champions and club rivals Barcelona SC.

On 7 August 2013, Valencia scored his first career hat-trick against Peruvian side Sport Huancayo, in a 4–0 2013 Copa Sudamericana first round match. He finished the season as league champions with Emelec, the club's first since 2002.

=== Pachuca ===
After numerous rumours involving the interest of Liga MX side Pachuca for Valencia, both parties came to terms and agreed on a transfer.

On 18 January 2014, Valencia scored his first goal in a 2–1 victory against Tijuana. The following week he scored two goals to in Pachuca's first away win league match against league champions Club León. He finished the regular season as the top goal-scorer with 12 goals, scoring various braces for Pachuca. Valencia scored his first hat-trick against UNAM in a 2–4 away win to advance in the 2014 Liga MX Clausura play-offs.

=== West Ham United ===
==== 2014–15 ====
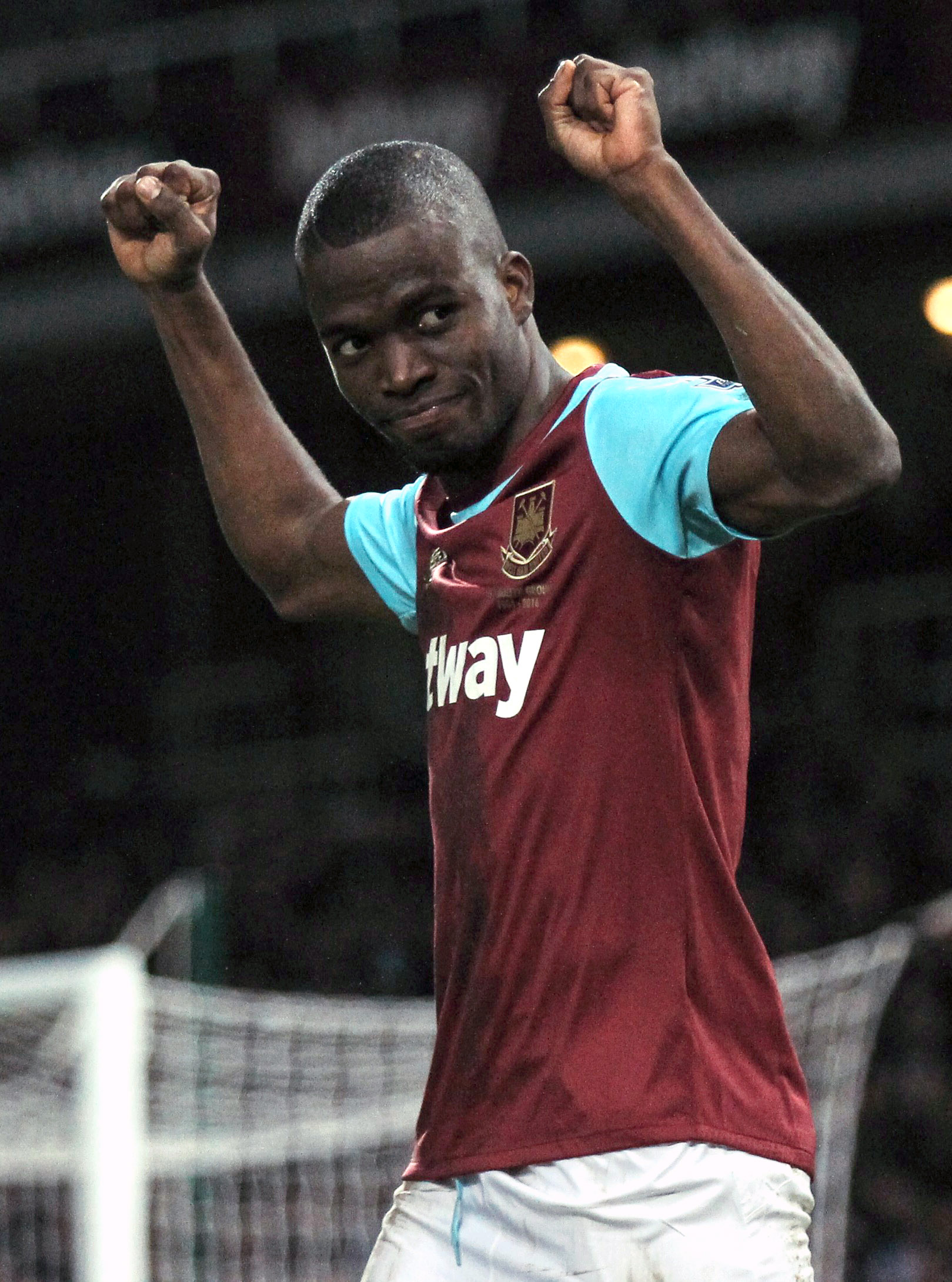
Valencia playing for West Ham United in 2016

On 29 July 2014, Premier League club West Ham United completed the transfer of Valencia, on a five-year contract for a fee estimated at £12 million. He later confirmed that he knew little about West Ham before signing and that he mainly knew of them having watched hooligan films such as the 2005 release of Green Street starring Elijah Wood. Valencia made his West Ham debut on 16 August 2014 in a 1–0 home defeat to Tottenham Hotspur coming on as an 81st-minute substitute for Carlton Cole. On 27 August, he had his penalty saved by Mark Howard as West Ham were knocked out at home in the second round of the League Cup by Sheffield United. Valencia's first goal for West Ham came in his full league debut, against Hull City on 15 September 2014, in a 2–2 draw. The 25-yard (23 m; 75 ft) strike, timed at 61 miles per hour (98 km/h), was described by journalist Henry Winter of The Daily Telegraph as an "exceptional goal". Valencia went on to score two more goals for West Ham in the following weeks, including a header in a 3–1 away win at Burnley, and a goal in a 2–2 draw with Stoke City.

==== 2015–16 ====
His first match of his second season was on 30 July 2015 in the UEFA Europa League third qualifying round first leg at home against Astra Giurgiu; he headed West Ham into the lead but was one of two players substituted through injury in the first half as the team eventually drew 2–2. It was confirmed that he had suffered "significant" injuries to his right knee and ankle, and was ruled out for twelve weeks. Valencia scored his first league goals of the 2015–16 season with two in a 3–1 comeback win against AFC Bournemouth on 12 January 2016, including a powerfully hit free-kick.

==== Loan to Everton ====
On 31 August 2016, Valencia signed for Everton on a season-long loan, with the option of a permanent £14.5 million move in the summer of 2017. Valencia scored his first league goal for Everton when he fired home from close range in a 3–0 win against Southampton on 2 January 2017.

=== Tigres UANL ===
On 13 July 2017, Valencia signed for Tigres UANL for a fee of 4.2 million.

=== Fenerbahçe ===
==== 2020–21 season ====
On 28 August 2020, Valencia signed for Süper Lig club Fenerbahçe on a free transfer. In his first year with the team, he scored 12 goals in 34 matches of 2020–21 Süper Lig.

==== 2021–22 season ====
On 26 August 2021, he made his first hat-trick with the team against HJK Helsinki in 2021–22 UEFA Europa League season and Fenerbahçe won the game 5-2 He scored 13 goals in all competitives of 33 matches.

==== 2022–23 season ====
He made a very strong start to the 2022–23 season with coach Jorge Jesus and recorded braces against Ümraniyespor, Kasımpaşa and Adana Demirspor in his first three matches of the season. On 15 January 2023, he also scored a brace against Gaziantep.

On 9 October 2022, he scored his first hat-trick in a league match against Karagümrük in 2022–23 Süper Lig season and Fenerbahçe won the match 5–4 and on 29 January 2023, he scored 4 goals against Kasımpaşa and helped Fenerbahçe to a 5–1 victory.

He also recorded braces against Konyaspor and Alanyaspor in the season. In total, Valencia scored 29 goals, becoming the top scorer in the Süper Lig.

=== Internacional ===
On 12 June 2023, Valencia signed a three-year contract with Série A club Internacional on a free transfer, signing with the Colorado club for three years. He made his debut for the team on 9 July, starting in a 2–0 loss to Fluminense at Maracanã. The player had a rather discreet performance, without any shots on goal and was substituted at halftime.

He scored his first goal for the club on 1 August, but couldn't prevent the comeback defeat of 2–1 to River Plate at Monumental de Nuñez, in a match valid for the Round of 16 of the Libertadores.

After advancing against River Plate, Internacional travelled to La Paz to face Bolívar in a quarter-final match of the Copa Libertadores. At the 16th minute of the game, Enner received a good pass from Alan Patrick and advanced alone against the Bolivian team's defenders, successfully finishing with a powerful and unstoppable shot into the lower right corner of the goalkeeper Lampe. The forward emerged as a hero in the Colorado's victory in high altitude, alongside Uruguayan goalkeeper Rochet, who made important saves.

=== Return to Pachuca ===
On 11 September 2025, Valencia joined Pachuca after leaving Internacional, beginning his second spell with the club. He departed the club in July 2026.

=== Boca Juniors ===
On 9 August 2026, Valencia signed for Argentine Primera División club Boca Juniors on a free transfer until 31 December 2027.

On 27 September 2026, he came on as a substitute and played for 23 minutes, he scored a hat-trick, leading his team to a 3–2 victory after they had been trailing 2–0 against Racing Club in Copa Argentina match.

On 7 November 2026, he came on as a substitute to Leandro Paredes and scored the winning goal on the 1-0 win against Defensa y Justicia in the 90+5 minute of the game, giving Boca the title of annual table champions.

== International career ==
After playing for the nation's under-22 team at the 2011 Pan American Games, Valencia made his debut for the Ecuador senior team on 12 February 2012 in a friendly against Honduras.

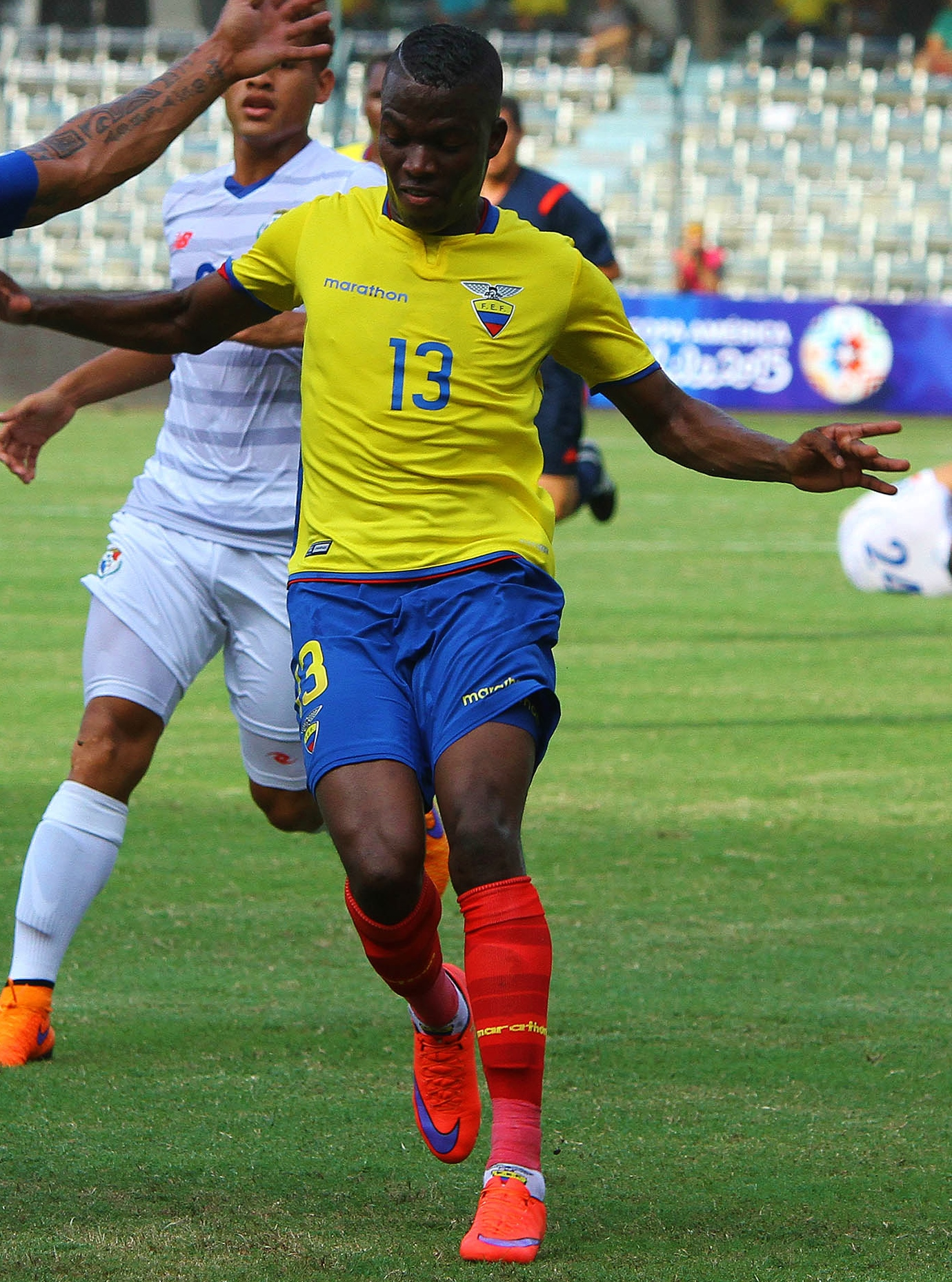
Valencia playing for the Ecuador national team in 2015

Valencia initially began his career as a winger, but was converted to play as a striker by Emelec coach Gustavo Quinteros. Reinaldo Rueda started experimenting with Valencia as a striker after the untimely death of Christian Benítez. After making three appearances in the 2014 FIFA World Cup qualification campaign, he scored his first international goal in a 2–2 draw against Honduras on 19 November 2013. He continued his good form in 2014, scoring in three of Ecuador's four pre-tournament friendlies. On 5 March, he scored, assisted a goal and won a penalty kick as La Tri came from 3–0 down to defeat Australia 4–3. He then scored the team's only goal in a 3–1 loss against Mexico, and gave them an early lead in a 2–2 draw with England in Miami.

In June 2014, Valencia was named to Ecuador's squad for the 2014 FIFA World Cup in Brazil. On 15 June, he made his World Cup debut in the team's opening match against Switzerland at the Estádio Nacional Mané Garrincha in Brasília, opening the scoring with a header in a 2–1 defeat. In Ecuador's second match, Valencia scored both goals to defeat Honduras 2–1 in Curitiba. He continued his good form after the tournament, scoring the third goal of a 4–0 victory against Bolivia. On 10 October, Valencia again netted for Ecuador in the 88th minute of a 1–1 friendly draw with the United States.

In Ecuador's second group match at the 2015 Copa América in Chile, Valencia successfully converted a penalty against Bolivia, but the kick had to be taken again due to an opponent's infringement; the re-take would be saved by goalkeeper Romel Quiñónez. Valencia later scored in the match from close range, but Ecuador lost 2–3 nonetheless. Four days later in Rancagua, Valencia set up Miller Bolaños' opener and scored Ecuador's second goal as they won 2–1 against Mexico, eliminating their opponents.

On 8 October 2021, in a 2022 World Cup qualification match against Bolivia, Valencia scored his 32nd and 33rd international goals, overtaking Agustín Delgado as Ecuador's all-time top goalscorer.

Valencia was named to the Ecuadorian squad for the 2022 FIFA World Cup in Qatar. During the World Cup opening match on 20 November, Valencia scored the first goal of the tournament from the penalty spot and then got a second via a header in the first half as Ecuador defeated hosts Qatar 2–0. In doing so, he became Ecuador's record scorer at World Cup final tournaments, with five goals. On 25 November, Valencia scored Ecuador's equaliser in a 1–1 draw against the Netherlands, thus becoming the first South American player to score six consecutive World Cup goals for their team.

On 10 September 2024, Valencia scored the only goal in Ecuador's 2026 World Cup qualifying win against Peru. He earned his 100th cap against Argentina on 9 September 2025, becoming the seventh Ecuadorian to do so, and scored the only goal of the match via a penalty kick to secure Ecuador their first victory over Argentina in nearly ten years.

On 31 May 2026, Valencia was named to Ecuador's 26-man squad for the 2026 FIFA World Cup in North America, becoming just the second Ecuadorian after Édison Méndez to feature in three different World Cup tournaments. After failing to score in any of his side's four matches, Valencia announced his international retirement following Ecuador's round of 32 elimination against co-hosts Mexico on 30 June.

== Personal life ==
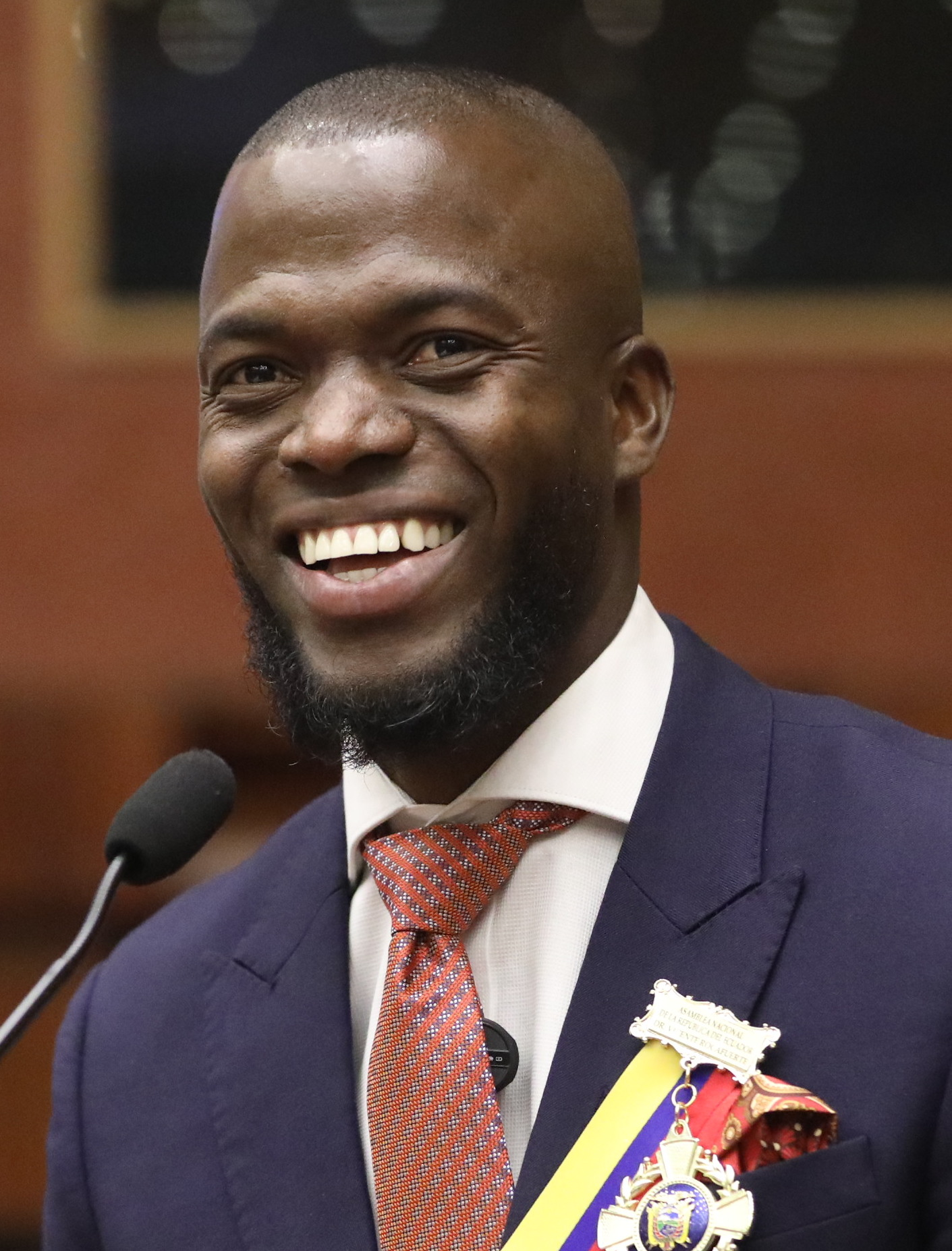
Valencia in 2025

Valencia hails from Esmeraldas Province and is of Afro-Ecuadorian descent. He came from a poor family and when he arrived at Emelec, he had to sleep in rudimentary lodgings at the club's Estadio George Capwell, as he had no money to stay anywhere else and at times struggled to buy enough to eat. In August 2020, Valencia's sister, Erci was taken hostage in San Lorenzo by an armed gang and held for 10 days before being released unharmed.

In October 2016, a warrant was issued for his arrest in Ecuador for unpaid child support. As his warrant coincided with a World Cup qualifier against Chile, police arrived to arrest him once the match concluded; Valencia then seemingly collapsed with an injury in the 82nd minute and had to be taken off with an ambulance cart, which then got into a pursuit with Ecuadorian police.

== Career statistics ==
=== Club ===
As of match played 14 November 2026

Appearances and goals by club, season and competition
Club	Season	League			National cup (Note: Includes Copa MX, FA Cup, Turkish Cup, Copa do Brasil)		League cup (Note: Includes Football League Cup/EFL Cup)		Continental		Other		Total	
Club	Season	Division	Apps	Goals	Apps	Goals	Apps	Goals	Apps	Goals	Apps	Goals	Apps	Goals
Emelec	2010	Ecuadorian Serie A	25	1	—		—		11 (Note: Seven appearances in Copa Libertadores, four appearances and one goal in Copa Sudamericana)	1	—		36	2
Emelec	2011	Ecuadorian Serie A	30	9	—		—		5 (Note: Four appearances in Copa Libertadores, one appearance in Copa Sudamericana)	0	—		35	9
Emelec	2012	Ecuadorian Serie A	40	13	—		—		14 (Note: Eight appearances in Copa Libertadores, six appearances in Copa Sudamericana)	0	—		54	13
Emelec	2013	Ecuadorian Serie A	35	4	—		—		11 (Note: Seven appearances in Copa Libertadores, four appearances and five goals in Copa Sudamericana)	5	—		46	9
Emelec	Total		130	27	—		—		41	6	—		171	33
Pachuca	2014	Liga MX	23	18	2	0	—		—		—		25	18
West Ham United	2014–15	Premier League	32	4	4	1	1	0	—		—		37	5
West Ham United	2015–16	Premier League	19	4	4	0	0	0	1 (Note: Appearance(s) in UEFA Europa League)	1	—		24	5
West Ham United	2016–17	Premier League	3	0	—		—		4	0	—		7	0
West Ham United	Total		54	8	8	1	1	0	5	1	—		68	10
Everton (loan)	2016–17	Premier League	21	3	1	0	1	0	—		—		23	3
Tigres UANL	2017–18	Liga MX	37	15	1	0	—		3 (Note: Appearances in CONCACAF Champions League)	2	1 (Note: Appearance in Campeones Cup)	0	42	17
Tigres UANL	2018–19	Liga MX	31	5	6	3	—		8	7	—		45	15
Tigres UANL	2019–20	Liga MX	27	1	0	0	—		4 (Note: Two appearances in Leagues Cup, two appearances and one goal in Campeones Cup)	1	—		31	2
Tigres UANL	Total		95	21	7	3	—		15	10	1	0	118	34
Fenerbahçe	2020–21	Süper Lig	34	12	1	1	—		—		—		35	13
Fenerbahçe	2021–22	Süper Lig	25	7	2	1	—		6 (Note: Four appearances and five goals in UEFA Europa League, two appearances in UEFA Europa Conference League)	5	—		33	13
Fenerbahçe	2022–23	Süper Lig	31	29	5	1	—		12 (Note: Two appearances in UEFA Champions League, ten appearances and three goals in UEFA Europa League)	3	—		48	33
Fenerbahçe	Total		90	48	8	3	—		18	8	—		116	59
Internacional	2023	Série A	22	9	—		—		6 (Note: Appearances in Copa Libertadores)	4	—		28	13
Internacional	2024	Série A	24	3	3	4	—		2 (Note: Appearances in Copa Sudamericana)	0	11 (Note: Appearances in Campeonato Gaúcho)	4	40	11
Internacional	2025	Série A	14	1	3	0	—		5	1	10	5	32	7
Internacional	Total		60	13	6	4	—		13	5	21	9	100	31
Pachuca	2025–26	Liga MX	22	8	—		—		—		—		22	8
Boca Juniors	2026	Primera División	10	3	3	3	—		5	0	—		18	6
Career total			505	149	35	14	2	0	95	29	22	9	661	202

=== International ===
As of match played 30 June 2026

Appearances and goals by national team and year
National team	Year	Apps	Goals
Ecuador	2012	1	0
Ecuador	2013	6	1
Ecuador	2014	10	10
Ecuador	2015	5	2
Ecuador	2016	12	6
Ecuador	2017	7	2
Ecuador	2018	5	6
Ecuador	2019	8	4
Ecuador	2020	2	0
Ecuador	2021	11	3
Ecuador	2022	10	4
Ecuador	2023	6	2
Ecuador	2024	12	4
Ecuador	2025	8	4
Ecuador	2026	5	1
Total		109	49

Scores and results list Ecuador's goal tally first, score column indicates score after each Valencia goal.

List of international goals scored by Enner Valencia
No.	Date	Venue	Opponent	Score	Result	Competition
1	19 November 2013	BBVA Compass Stadium, Houston, United States	Honduras	2–2	2–2	Friendly
2	5 March 2014	The Den, London, England	Australia	3–3	4–3	Friendly
3	31 May 2014	AT&T Stadium, Arlington, United States	Mexico	1–3	1–3	Friendly
4	4 June 2014	Sun Life Stadium, Miami, United States	England	1–0	2–2	Friendly
5	15 June 2014	Estádio Nacional Mané Garrincha, Brasília, Brazil	Switzerland	1–0	1–2	2014 FIFA World Cup
6	20 June 2014	Arena da Baixada, Curitiba, Brazil	Honduras	1–1	2–1	2014 FIFA World Cup
7	20 June 2014	Arena da Baixada, Curitiba, Brazil	Honduras	2–1	2–1	2014 FIFA World Cup
8	6 September 2014	Lockhart Stadium, Fort Lauderdale, United States	Bolivia	3–0	4–0	Friendly
9	10 October 2014	Rentschler Field, East Hartford, United States	United States	1–1	1–1	Friendly
10	14 October 2014	Red Bull Arena, Harrison, United States	El Salvador	2–0	5–1	Friendly
11	14 October 2014	Red Bull Arena, Harrison, United States	El Salvador	4–1	5–1	Friendly
12	15 June 2015	Estadio Elías Figueroa Brander, Valparaíso, Chile	Bolivia	1–3	2–3	2015 Copa América
13	19 June 2015	Estadio El Teniente, Rancagua, Chile	Mexico	2–0	2–1	2015 Copa América
14	24 March 2016	Estadio Olímpico Atahualpa, Quito, Ecuador	Paraguay	1–0	2–2	2018 FIFA World Cup qualification
15	8 June 2016	University of Phoenix Stadium, Glendale, United States	Peru	1–2	2–2	Copa América Centenario
16	12 June 2016	MetLife Stadium, East Rutherford, United States	Haiti	1–0	4–0	Copa América Centenario
17	11 October 2016	Estadio Hernando Siles, La Paz, Bolivia	Bolivia	1–2	2–2	2018 FIFA World Cup qualification
18	11 October 2016	Estadio Hernando Siles, La Paz, Bolivia	Bolivia	2–2	2–2	2018 FIFA World Cup qualification
19	15 November 2016	Estadio Olímpico Atahualpa, Quito, Ecuador	Venezuela	3–0	3–0	2018 FIFA World Cup qualification
20	13 June 2017	Red Bull Arena, Harrison, United States	El Salvador	2–0	3–0	Friendly
21	5 September 2017	Estadio Olímpico Atahualpa, Quito, Ecuador	Peru	1–2	1–2	2018 FIFA World Cup qualification
22	7 September 2018	Red Bull Arena, Harrison, United States	Jamaica	1–0	2–0	Friendly
23	11 September 2018	Toyota Park, Bridgeview, United States	Guatemala	1–0	2–0	Friendly
24	12 October 2018	Jassim bin Hamad Stadium, Doha, Qatar	Qatar	1–2	3–4	Friendly
25	12 October 2018	Jassim bin Hamad Stadium, Doha, Qatar	Qatar	2–4	3–4	Friendly
26	15 November 2018	National Stadium of Peru, Lima, Peru	Peru	2–0	2–0	Friendly
27	20 November 2018	Estadio Rommel Fernández, Panama City, Panama	Panama	2–1	2–1	Friendly
28	1 June 2019	Hard Rock Stadium, Miami, United States	Venezuela	1–1	1–1	Friendly
29	21 June 2019	Itaipava Arena Fonte Nova, Salvador, Brazil	Chile	1–1	1–2	2019 Copa América
30	14 November 2019	Estadio Reales Tamarindos, Portoviejo, Ecuador	Trinidad and Tobago	2–0	3–0	Friendly
31	14 November 2019	Estadio Reales Tamarindos, Portoviejo, Ecuador	Trinidad and Tobago	3–0	3–0	Friendly
32	7 October 2021	Estadio Monumental Isidro Romero Carbo, Guayaquil, Ecuador	Bolivia	2–0	3–0	2022 FIFA World Cup qualification
33	7 October 2021	Estadio Monumental Isidro Romero Carbo, Guayaquil, Ecuador	Bolivia	3–0	3–0	2022 FIFA World Cup qualification
34	10 October 2021	Estadio Olímpico de la UCV, Caracas, Venezuela	Venezuela	1–0	1–2	2022 FIFA World Cup qualification
35	29 March 2022	Estadio Monumental Isidro Romero Carbo, Guayaquil, Ecuador	Argentina	1–1	1–1	2022 FIFA World Cup qualification
36	20 November 2022	Al Bayt Stadium, Al Khor, Qatar	Qatar	1–0	2–0	2022 FIFA World Cup
37	20 November 2022	Al Bayt Stadium, Al Khor, Qatar	Qatar	2–0	2–0	2022 FIFA World Cup
38	25 November 2022	Khalifa International Stadium, Al Rayyan, Qatar	Netherlands	1–1	1–1	2022 FIFA World Cup
39	17 June 2023	Red Bull Arena, Harrison, United States	Bolivia	1–0	1–0	Friendly
40	20 June 2023	Subaru Park, Chester, United States	Costa Rica	1–0	3–1	Friendly
41	12 June 2024	Subaru Park, Chester, United States	Bolivia	1–0	3–1	Friendly
42	10 September 2024	Estadio Rodrigo Paz Delgado, Quito, Ecuador	Peru	1–0	1–0	2026 FIFA World Cup qualification
43	14 November 2024	Estadio Monumental Isidro Romero Carbo, Guayaquil, Ecuador	Bolivia	1–0	4–0	2026 FIFA World Cup qualification
44	19 November 2024	Estadio Metropolitano Roberto Meléndez, Barranquilla, Colombia	Colombia	1–0	1–0	2026 FIFA World Cup qualification
45	21 March 2025	Estadio Rodrigo Paz Delgado, Quito, Ecuador	Venezuela	1–0	2–1	2026 FIFA World Cup qualification
46	21 March 2025	Estadio Rodrigo Paz Delgado, Quito, Ecuador	Venezuela	2–0	2–1	2026 FIFA World Cup qualification
47	9 September 2025	Estadio Monumental Isidro Romero Carbo, Guayaquil, Ecuador	Argentina	1–0	1–0	2026 FIFA World Cup qualification
48	10 October 2025	Q2 Stadium, Austin, United States	United States	1–0	1–1	Friendly
49	31 March 2026	Philips Stadion, Eindhoven, Netherlands	Netherlands	1–1	1–1	Friendly

== Honours ==
Emelec

- Ecuadorian Serie A: 2013

Tigres UANL

- Liga MX: Apertura 2017, Clausura 2019
- Campeones Cup: 2018

Fenerbahçe

- Turkish Cup: 2022–23

Internacional

- Campeonato Gaúcho: 2025

Boca Juniors

- Argentine Primera División: 2026 Liga
- Copa Sudamericana : 2026

Individual

- Ecuadorian Serie A Best Player: 2013
- Copa Sudamericana Top scorer: 2013
- Liga MX Top scorer: Clausura 2014
- Liga MX Best XI: Apertura 2017
- CONCACAF Champions League Golden Boot: 2019
- CONCACAF Champions League Team of the Tournament: 2019
- Süper Lig Top scorer: 2022–23
- Süper Lig Team of the Season: 2022–23

== See also ==
- List of top international men's football goal scorers by country
- List of men's footballers with 100 or more international caps
- List of FIFA World Cup top goalscorers

Sporting positions
Preceded by Yury Gazinsky	FIFA World Cup opening goal 2022	Succeeded by Julián Quiñones
