= Emanuel Loeschbor =

Argentinian-Mexican footballer (born 1986)

Personal information
- Full name: Emanuel Sebastián Loeschbor
- Date of birth: 16 October 1986 (age 40)
- Place of birth: Córdoba, Argentina
- Height: 1.82 m (6 ft 0 in)
- Position: Center back

Senior career*
Years	Team	Apps	(Gls)
2005–2006	Racing	13	(0)
2006–2007	Quilmes		
2008	Sol de América	10	(0)
2008	Lorca Deportiva B		
2009–2010	Juventud Antoniana		
2010–2011	San Martín de Tucumán		
2012–2014	Morelia	0	(0)
2012–2013	→ Toros Neza (loan)	31	(1)
2013–2014	→ Cruz Azul Hidalgo (loan)	23	(0)
2014–2018	Cruz Azul	8	(0)
2016–2018	→ Morelia (loan)	58	(3)
2018–2021	Morelia	33	(0)
2020	→ Correcaminos (loan)	3	(0)
- * Club domestic league appearances and goals

Emanuel Loeschbor (born 16 October 1986) is an Argentinian-Mexican former professional footballer who played as a center back. He holds Mexican citizenship.

== Club history ==
In December 2015 Morelia officially announced that Loeschbor will be joining the team on loan from Cruz Azul.

== Honours ==
=== Club ===
Cruz Azul

- CONCACAF Champions League: 2013–14
