= Ignacio Sánchez (footballer) =

Mexican footballer and manager (born 1972)

Personal information
- Full name: Ignacio Raúl Sánchez Barrera
- Date of birth: 20 June 1972 (age 54)
- Place of birth: Puebla, Puebla, Mexico
- Position: Goalkeeper

Senior career*
Years	Team	Apps	(Gls)
1999–2002	Puebla	0	(0)
2003	Atlético Yucatán	8	(0)
2003	Riviera Maya	8	(0)
2004–2005	Mérida	50	(0)

Managerial career
- 2006–2008: Puebla (Assistant)
- 2008–2016: Puebla (Goalkeeper coach)
- 2016–2017: Puebla (Assistant)
- 2017: Puebla (Interim)
- 2017–2025: Puebla (Goalkeeper coach)
- * Club domestic league appearances and goals

Ignacio Raúl Sánchez Barrera (born 20 June 1972) is a Mexican former professional footballer and current manager.
