= Fernando Uribe =

Colombian footballer (born 1988)

Personal information
- Full name: Fernando Uribe Hincapié
- Date of birth: 1 January 1988 (age 38)
- Place of birth: Pereira, Colombia
- Height: 1.82 m (6 ft 0 in)
- Position: Striker

Team information
- Current team: Deportivo Pereira
- Number: 20

Youth career
- Atlético Huila

Senior career*
Years	Team	Apps	(Gls)
2003–2005	Atlético Huila	17	(1)
2006–2007	Girardot	23	(1)
2008	Cortuluá	28	(1)
2009	Deportivo Pereira	19	(8)
2010	Once Caldas	36	(24)
2011–2012	Chievo	12	(2)
2012–2015	Atlético Nacional	47	(15)
2014–2015	→ Millonarios (loan)	37	(25)
2015–2018	Toluca	98	(46)
2018–2019	Flamengo	20	(6)
2019–2020	Santos	11	(0)
2021	Millonarios	42	(23)
2022	Junior	14	(4)
2023	Millonarios	37	(4)
2024–	Deportivo Pereira	6	(1)
Total		441	(160)

International career
2010	Colombia	2	(0)
- * Club domestic league appearances and goals

Fernando Uribe Hincapié (born 1 January 1988) is a Colombian professional footballer who plays as a striker for Deportivo Pereira.

== Club career ==
=== Early career ===
Born in Pereira, Uribe was an Atlético Huila youth graduate. On 24 April 2003, he scored his first professional goal by netting the opener in a 2–2 Categoría Primera A away draw against Cortuluá; aged just 15 years, 3 months and 23 days, he became the youngest player ever to score a goal in Colombian professional football.

Regularly used during his debut season, Uribe failed to appear in the following two campaigns, and moved to Categoría Primera B side Girardot in December 2005. After two years being sparingly used, he subsequently moved to fellow second division club Cortuluá; his only goal for the latter club came on 25 August 2008, when he scored the only goal of a home defeat of Unión Magdalena.

Uribe returned to the top tier in 2009, playing with Deportivo Pereira. After spending the first half of the campaign without scoring, he netted eight times during the Clausura tournament, helping his side reach the semifinals; highlights included a hat-trick in a 4–1 home routing of Once Caldas on 13 September.

=== Once Caldas ===
In January 2010, Uribe joined Once Caldas after impressing with Pereira. On his debut for the club on 31 January, he scored a hat-trick in a 4–3 away loss against Real Cartagena.

Uribe scored a career-best 24 league goals during the year, also scoring three times in a 5–3 loss at Deportivo Cali and in a 3–1 home defeat of América de Cali.

=== Chievo ===
On 20 January 2011, Uribe moved abroad for the first time in his career, agreeing to a four-year contract with Serie A club ChievoVerona. He made his debut abroad on 6 March, coming on as a late substitute for Davide Mandelli in a 0–0 home draw against Parma.

Uribe scored his first goal abroad on 9 May 2011, netting the opener in a 2–2 away draw against Juventus. He also scored a brace in a 3–0 success over Modena.

=== Atlético Nacional ===
On 23 July 2012, Uribe returned to his homeland and signed a four-year deal with Atlético Nacional. He scored in only his second match for the club, a 1–1 home draw against Rionegro on 6 August, and scored a brace in a 2–0 home success over against La Equidad on 9 December.

==== Millonarios (loan) ====
On 27 June 2014, Uribe was presented at Millonarios, on loan for one year with a buyout clause. On 28 September, he scored four times in a 4–0 home routing of Fortaleza FC.

On 17 May 2015, Uribe scored the equalizer in a 3–1 win against Independiente Santa Fe, helping his team qualify to the tournament's semifinals. Four days later, in the first leg of the quarterfinals, he scored a hat-trick in a 4–0 win over Envigado, as his side advanced with a 6–3 aggregate score. In the semifinals, he scored a brace in a 3–2 away defeat of Deportivo Cali, but his side was knocked out in the shoot-outs.

=== Toluca ===
On 23 June 2015, Liga MX team Toluca officially announced Uribe as their new striker, in a three-year contract. He made his debut on 25 July, in a 1–0 away win against Tigres UANL.

On 29 July 2015, Uribe scored his first hat-trick in the first game of the Copa MX, a 4–2 win against Necaxa. On 13 September, Uribe scored four goals in a 4–3 success over Pachuca.

=== Flamengo ===
On 26 June 2018 Uribe signed a four-year contract with Série A club Flamengo. He made his debut for the club on 19 July, replacing Marlos Moreno on the 62nd minute of a 1–0 loss to São Paulo at the Maracanã Stadium.

On 29 July 2018, Uribe scored his first goal for the club, in a 4–1 routing of Sport Recife also at the Maracanã. In the following campaign, however, he lost space after the arrivals of Gabriel and Bruno Henrique.

=== Santos ===
On 30 May 2019, Uribe moved to fellow top-tier club Santos, signing a contract until December 2022. He made his debut for the club three days later, starting in a 1–0 away defeat of Ceará.

On 18 September 2020, after 16 goalless appearances, Uribe left Santos after being released from his contract by the Brazilian Football Confederation; the entity, however, denied the appeal for just cause, and also allowed Santos to ask for a compensation fee if Uribe signs for another club.

=== Millonarios ===
On 18 January 2021, Uribe signed with Colombian side Millonarios F.C.

== International career ==
Uribe made his full international debut for Colombia on 11 August 2010, replacing Carlos Bacca in a 1–1 draw against Bolivia in La Paz.

== Career statistics ==
=== Club ===
As of 13 August 2020

Club	Season	League			Cup		Continental		State League		Other		Total	
Club	Season	Division	Apps	Goals	Apps	Goals	Apps	Goals	Apps	Goals	Apps	Goals	Apps	Goals
Atlético Huila	2003	Categoría Primera A	17	1	—		—		—		—		17	1
Atlético Huila	2004	Categoría Primera A	0	0	—		—		—		—		0	0
Atlético Huila	2005	Categoría Primera A	0	0	—		—		—		—		0	0
Atlético Huila	Subtotal		17	1	—		—		—		—		17	1
Girardot	2006	Categoría Primera B	6	0	—		—		—		—		6	0
Girardot	2007	Categoría Primera B	17	1	—		—		—		—		17	1
Girardot	Subtotal		23	1	—		—		—		—		23	1
Cortuluá	2008	Categoría Primera B	28	1	—		—		—		—		28	1
Deportivo Pereira	2009	Categoría Primera A	19	8	—		—		—		2 (Note: Appearance(s) in Relegation play-offs)	2	21	10
Once Caldas	2010	Categoría Primera A	36	24	0	0	8 (Note: Appearance(s) in Copa Libertadores)	1	—		—		44	25
Chievo	2011–12	Serie A	7	1	2	2	—		—		—		9	3
Chievo	2012–13	Serie A	5	1	0	0	—		—		—		5	1
Chievo	Subtotal		12	2	2	2	—		—		—		14	4
Atlético Nacional	2012	Categoría Primera A	14	4	3	1	—		—		—		17	5
Atlético Nacional	2013	Categoría Primera A	25	8	13	6	7 (Note: Appearance(s) in Copa Sudamericana)	1	—		—		45	15
Atlético Nacional	2014	Categoría Primera A	8	3	0	0	2	0	—		—		10	3
Atlético Nacional	Subtotal		47	15	16	7	9	1	—		—		72	23
Millonarios	2014	Categoría Primera A	14	10	5	2	2	2	—		—		21	14
Millonarios	2015	Categoría Primera A	23	15	2	0	—		—		—		25	15
Millonarios	Subtotal		37	25	7	2	2	2	—		—		46	29
Toluca	2015–16	Liga MX	29	12	2	3	4	5	—		—		35	20
Toluca	2016–17	Liga MX	34	15	8	7	—		—		—		42	22
Toluca	2017–18	Liga MX	37	19	5	0	—		—		—		42	19
Toluca	Subtotal		100	44	15	10	4	5	—		—		119	59
Flamengo	2018	Série A	20	6	2	0	1	0	—		—		23	6
Flamengo	2019	Série A	0	0	0	0	2	1	12 (Note: Appearance(s) in Campeonato Carioca)	1	—		14	2
Flamengo	Subtotal		20	6	2	0	3	1	12	1	—		37	8
Santos	2019	Série A	10	0	1	0	—		—		—		11	0
Santos	2020	Série A	1	0	0	0	0	0	4 (Note: Appearance(s) in Campeonato Paulista)	0	—		5	0
Santos	Subtotal		11	0	1	0	0	0	4	0	—		16	0
Total			350	129	43	21	26	10	16	1	2	2	437	163

=== International ===
As of 17 January 2019

Colombia
Year	Apps	Goals
2010	2	0
Total	2	0

== Honours ==
Once Caldas

- Categoría Primera A: 2010-II

Atlético Nacional

- Copa Colombia: 2012
- Superliga Colombiana: 2012

Flamengo

- Campeonato Carioca: 2019

Millonarios

- Categoría Primera A: 2023-I
