= List of Mexican football transfers summer 2019 =

This is a list of Mexican football transfers for the 2019 summer transfer window, grouped by club. It includes football transfers related to clubs from the Liga BBVA MX and the Ascenso MX.

== Liga BBVA MX ==
=== América ===
In: Note: Flags indicate national team as defined under FIFA eligibility rules; some limited exceptions apply. Players may hold more than one non-FIFA nationality.

| No. | Pos. | Nation | Player |
|---|---|---|---|
| 6 | GK | MEX | Guillermo Ochoa (from (Belgium) Standard Liège) |
| 10 | FW | MEX | Giovani dos Santos (from (United States) LA Galaxy) |
| 13 | MF | MEX | Leonel López (from Toluca) |
| 24 | FW | URU | Federico Viñas (from (Uruguay) Juventud) |
| 25 | MF | MEX | Fernando González (from Necaxa) |
| — | FW | MEX | Alejandro Díaz (loan return from Atlas) |

Out: Note: Flags indicate national team as defined under FIFA eligibility rules; some limited exceptions apply. Players may hold more than one non-FIFA nationality.

| No. | Pos. | Nation | Player |
|---|---|---|---|
| 1 | GK | ARG | Agustín Marchesín (to (Portugal) Porto) |
| 4 | DF | MEX | Edson Álvarez (to (Netherlands) Ajax) |
| 8 | MF | COL | Mateus Uribe (to (Portugal) Porto) |
| 12 | DF | MEX | Luis Reyes (on loan to Atlético San Luis) |
| 24 | FW | MEX | Oribe Peralta (to Guadalajara) |
| 25 | MF | MEX | Iván Moreno (on loan to Zacatepec) |
| 28 | DF | MEX | Oswaldo León (on loan to Zacatepec) |
| 34 | DF | MEX | Daniel Zamora (on loan to Zacatepec) |
| 287 | MF | MEX | José Hernández (on loan to Zacatepec) |
| — | DF | MEX | Bryan Colula (on loan to Zacatepec, previously on loan at Venados) |
| — | MF | MEX | Alfonso Sánchez (on loan to Zacatepec, previously on loan at Oaxaca) |
| — | FW | MEX | Aldo Cruz (to Tijuana, previously on loan at BUAP) |

=== Atlas ===
In: Note: Flags indicate national team as defined under FIFA eligibility rules; some limited exceptions apply. Players may hold more than one non-FIFA nationality.

| No. | Pos. | Nation | Player |
|---|---|---|---|
| — | GK | COL | Camilo Vargas (from (Colombia) Deportivo Cali) |
| — | DF | MEX | Jesús A. Angulo (on loan from Santos Laguna) |
| — | DF | MEX | Diego Barbosa (loan return from Sinaloa) |
| — | DF | ARG | Martín Nervo (on loan from Santos Laguna) |
| — | MF | ECU | Manu Balda (from (Ecuador) El Nacional) |
| — | FW | ARG | Javier Correa (on loan from Santos Laguna) |
| — | FW | COL | Mauricio Cuero (from Santos Laguna, previously on loan at (Argentina) Belgrano) |
| — | FW | MEX | Édson Rivera (loan return from Sinaloa) |

Out: Note: Flags indicate national team as defined under FIFA eligibility rules; some limited exceptions apply. Players may hold more than one non-FIFA nationality.

| No. | Pos. | Nation | Player |
|---|---|---|---|
| 7 | MF | MEX | Juan Pablo Vigón (to UNAM) |
| 10 | MF | GHA | Clifford Aboagye (on loan to Querétaro) |
| 14 | DF | USA | Omar Gonzalez (loan return to Pachuca) |
| 16 | DF | MEX | Heriberto Olvera (loan return to Pachuca) |
| 18 | FW | MEX | Alejandro Díaz (loan return to América) |
| 25 | MF | MEX | José Ávila (on loan to Tampico Madero) |
| 27 | MF | MEX | Edyairth Ortega (on loan to Tampico Madero) |
| 28 | MF | HON | Cristian Cálix (on loan to (United States) Real Monarchs) |
| 34 | MF | MEX | Irving Zurita (loan return to Atlante) |
| — | DF | MEX | Gaddi Aguirre (re-loan to Tampico Madero) |
| — | DF | MEX | Edson García (on loan to Tampico Madero, previously on loan at Veracruz) |
| — | DF | MEX | Giovanni León (on loan to Oaxaca, previously on loan at Atlético San Luis) |

=== Atlético San Luis ===
In: Note: Flags indicate national team as defined under FIFA eligibility rules; some limited exceptions apply. Players may hold more than one non-FIFA nationality.

| No. | Pos. | Nation | Player |
|---|---|---|---|
| 7 | MF | ARG | Germán Berterame (from (Argentina) San Lorenzo, previously on loan at (Argentina) Patronato) |
| 9 | FW | ARG | Nicolás Ibáñez (to (Spain) Atlético Madrid, later acquired on loan) |
| 10 | MF | ARG | Ricardo Centurión (on loan from (Argentina) Racing) |
| 13 | GK | ARG | Axel Werner (on loan from (Spain) Atlético Madrid, previously on loan at (Spain) Málaga) |
| 16 | DF | MEX | Luis Reyes (on loan from América) |
| 17 | MF | PAR | Diego Valdez (from (Paraguay) Sportivo San Lorenzo) |
| 18 | MF | URU | Camilo Mayada (from (Argentina) River Plate) |
| 25 | DF | ARG | Joaquín Laso (from (Argentina) Vélez Sarsfield) |
| 29 | MF | MEX | Diego Hernández (on loan from Guadalajara) |
| — | DF | ESP | Borja González (loan return from (Spain) S.S. Reyes) |
| — | MF | MEX | Carlos Gutiérrez (on loan from UNAM) |
| — | FW | MEX | Shayr Mohamed (from (Argentina) Huracán) |

Out: Note: Flags indicate national team as defined under FIFA eligibility rules; some limited exceptions apply. Players may hold more than one non-FIFA nationality.

| No. | Pos. | Nation | Player |
|---|---|---|---|
| 3 | DF | MEX | Giovanni León (loan return to Atlas) |
| 7 | MF | ARG | Claudio Villagra (loan return to (Argentina) Banfield) |
| 10 | MF | ARG | Leandro Torres (on loan to Tampico Madero) |
| 11 | MF | ARG | Marcos Astina (loan return to (Argentina) Lanús) |
| 29 | MF | MEX | Kevin Lara (loan return to Santos Laguna) |

=== Cruz Azul ===
In: Note: Flags indicate national team as defined under FIFA eligibility rules; some limited exceptions apply. Players may hold more than one non-FIFA nationality.

| No. | Pos. | Nation | Player |
|---|---|---|---|
| 10 | MF | ARG | Pol Fernández (from (Argentina) Racing) |
| — | DF | PAR | Juan Escobar (from (Paraguay) Cerro Porteño) |

Out: Note: Flags indicate national team as defined under FIFA eligibility rules; some limited exceptions apply. Players may hold more than one non-FIFA nationality.

| No. | Pos. | Nation | Player |
|---|---|---|---|
| 30 | DF | MEX | Jordan Silva (to Tijuana) |
| — | MF | MEX | Carlos Fierro (to (United States) San Jose Earthquakes, previously on loan at Morelia) |

=== Guadalajara ===
In: Note: Flags indicate national team as defined under FIFA eligibility rules; some limited exceptions apply. Players may hold more than one non-FIFA nationality.

| No. | Pos. | Nation | Player |
|---|---|---|---|
| 3 | DF | MEX | Oswaldo Alanís (from (Spain) Real Oviedo) |
| 4 | GK | MEX | José Antonio Rodríguez (loan return from BUAP) |
| 14 | DF | MEX | Antonio Briseño (from (Portugal) Feirense) |
| 24 | FW | MEX | Oribe Peralta (from América) |
| 30 | FW | MEX | José de Jesús González (loan return from (Spain) Tudelano) |
| 33 | FW | MEX | César Huerta (loan return from Zacatepec) |

Out: Note: Flags indicate national team as defined under FIFA eligibility rules; some limited exceptions apply. Players may hold more than one non-FIFA nationality.

| No. | Pos. | Nation | Player |
|---|---|---|---|
| 4 | DF | MEX | Jair Pereira (to Querétaro) |
| 5 | DF | MEX | Hedgardo Marín (on loan to Zacatecas) |
| 15 | DF | MEX | Tony Alfaro (on loan to Zacatepec) |
| 23 | FW | MEX | Jesús Godínez (on loan to León) |
| 28 | DF | MEX | Miguel Basulto (on loan to Zacatepec) |
| 94 | FW | MEX | Iván Gutiérrez (to (United States) LA Galaxy II) |
| 108 | MF | MEX | Carlos Ochoa (on loan to Zacatepec) |
| 132 | DF | MEX | Diego Cortés (on loan to (Spain) Tudelano) |
| 284 | MF | MEX | Diego Hernández (on loan to Atlético San Luis) |
| — | FW | MEX | Marco Granados (on loan to (Nicaragua) Real Estelí, previously on loan at (Greece) Aiginiakos) |

=== Juárez ===
In: Note: Flags indicate national team as defined under FIFA eligibility rules; some limited exceptions apply. Players may hold more than one non-FIFA nationality.

| No. | Pos. | Nation | Player |
|---|---|---|---|
| 8 | FW | PAR | Darío Lezcano (on loan from (Germany) Ingolstadt 04) |
| 16 | DF | MEX | Joaquín Esquivel (on loan from Pachuca, previously on loan at BUAP) |
| 18 | FW | CHI | Ángelo Sagal (on loan from Pachuca) |
| 22 | FW | MEX | Eduardo Pérez (from Tampico Madero) |
| 26 | MF | MEX | Alberto Acosta (on loan from UANL, previously on loan at Morelia) |
| — | MF | ECU | Jefferson Intriago (on loan from UANL, previously at (Ecuador) LDU Quito) |

Out: Note: Flags indicate national team as defined under FIFA eligibility rules; some limited exceptions apply. Players may hold more than one non-FIFA nationality.

| No. | Pos. | Nation | Player |
|---|---|---|---|
| 6 | DF | MEX | Kevin Gutiérrez (to UAT) |
| 8 | MF | URU | Leonardo Pais (to (Uruguay) Liverpool Montevideo) |
| 12 | FW | MEX | Josué Gómez (on loan to (United States) El Paso Locomotive) |
| 18 | FW | BRA | Ramazotti (to (South Korea) Daejeon Citizen) |
| 21 | DF | BRA | Massari (to Chiapas) |
| 22 | DF | MEX | Ricardo Chávez (to Necaxa) |
| 182 | FW | MEX | Omar Pánuco (on loan to UANL) |

=== León ===
In: Note: Flags indicate national team as defined under FIFA eligibility rules; some limited exceptions apply. Players may hold more than one non-FIFA nationality.

| No. | Pos. | Nation | Player |
|---|---|---|---|
| — | MF | COL | Jown Cardona (from (Colombia) Deportivo Pasto) |
| — | MF | ARG | Ismael Sosa (on loan from UANL) |
| — | FW | MEX | Jesús Godínez (on loan from Guadalajara) |
| — | FW | ARG | Leonardo Ramos (from BUAP) |

Out: Note: Flags indicate national team as defined under FIFA eligibility rules; some limited exceptions apply. Players may hold more than one non-FIFA nationality.

| No. | Pos. | Nation | Player |

=== Monterrey ===
In: Note: Flags indicate national team as defined under FIFA eligibility rules; some limited exceptions apply. Players may hold more than one non-FIFA nationality.

| No. | Pos. | Nation | Player |
|---|---|---|---|
| 9 | FW | NED | Vincent Janssen (from (England) Tottenham Hotspur) |
| — | MF | MEX | William Mejía (loan return from (Spain) Toledo) |

Out: Note: Flags indicate national team as defined under FIFA eligibility rules; some limited exceptions apply. Players may hold more than one non-FIFA nationality.

| No. | Pos. | Nation | Player |
|---|---|---|---|
| — | DF | MEX | Germán Camacho (released, previously on loan at (Spain) Toledo) |
| — | MF | MEX | Javier Ibarra (on loan to Atlante) |
| — | FW | MEX | Daniel Lajud (on loan to Puebla, previously on loan at Querétaro) |

=== Morelia ===
In: Note: Flags indicate national team as defined under FIFA eligibility rules; some limited exceptions apply. Players may hold more than one non-FIFA nationality.

| No. | Pos. | Nation | Player |
|---|---|---|---|
| — | DF | MEX | Joaquín Martínez (from Pachuca) |
| — | MF | ARG | Lucas Villafáñez (from (Turkey) Alanyaspor) |
| — | FW | VEN | Fernando Aristeguieta (from (Colombia) América de Cali) |
| — | FW | MEX | Luis Ángel Mendoza (from Toluca) |

Out: Note: Flags indicate national team as defined under FIFA eligibility rules; some limited exceptions apply. Players may hold more than one non-FIFA nationality.

| No. | Pos. | Nation | Player |
|---|---|---|---|
| 7 | MF | MEX | Carlos Fierro (loan return to Cruz Azul) |
| 22 | MF | MEX | Alberto Acosta (loan return to UANL) |

=== Necaxa ===
In: Note: Flags indicate national team as defined under FIFA eligibility rules; some limited exceptions apply. Players may hold more than one non-FIFA nationality.

| No. | Pos. | Nation | Player |
|---|---|---|---|
| 201 | MF | MEX | Diego Cornejo (loan return from (Spain) Alcorcón) |
| — | DF | MEX | Ricardo Chávez (from Juárez) |
| — | DF | MEX | Jairo González (loan return from BUAP) |
| — | DF | ARG | Rodrigo Noya (from Veracruz) |
| — | MF | MEX | Jesús R. Angulo (from Tijuana) |
| — | FW | ARG | Mauro Quiroga (from (Chile) Curicó Unido) |

Out: Note: Flags indicate national team as defined under FIFA eligibility rules; some limited exceptions apply. Players may hold more than one non-FIFA nationality.

| No. | Pos. | Nation | Player |
|---|---|---|---|
| 3 | DF | MEX | Luis Hernández (to Toluca) |
| 9 | MF | MEX | Martín Barragán (on loan to UNAM) |
| 11 | FW | ARG | Brian Fernández (to (United States) Portland Timbers) |
| 21 | FW | MEX | Eduardo Herrera (loan return to (Scotland) Rangers) |
| 23 | FW | MEX | Ángel Sepúlveda (to Tijuana) |
| 24 | MF | MEX | Fernando González (to América) |

=== Pachuca ===
In: Note: Flags indicate national team as defined under FIFA eligibility rules; some limited exceptions apply. Players may hold more than one non-FIFA nationality.

| No. | Pos. | Nation | Player |
|---|---|---|---|
| — | GK | ARG | Rodrigo Rey (from (Greece) PAOK) |
| — | DF | ARG | Gustavo Cabral (from (Spain) Celta de Vigo) |
| — | DF | MEX | Heriberto Olvera (loan return from Atlas) |
| — | MF | MEX | Luis Chávez (from Tijuana) |
| — | MF | ECU | Romario Ibarra (on loan from (United States) Minnesota United) |
| — | FW | COL | Jonathan Copete (on loan from (Brazil) Santos) |

Out: Note: Flags indicate national team as defined under FIFA eligibility rules; some limited exceptions apply. Players may hold more than one non-FIFA nationality.

| No. | Pos. | Nation | Player |
|---|---|---|---|
| 7 | FW | CHI | Ángelo Sagal (on loan to Juárez) |
| 18 | DF | MEX | Joaquín Martínez (to Morelia) |
| — | DF | MEX | Joaquín Esquivel (on loan to Juárez, previously on loan at BUAP) |
| — | DF | USA | Omar Gonzalez (to (Canada) Toronto, previously on loan at Atlas) |
| — | MF | MEX | Mauro Lainez (on loan to Tijuana, previously on loan at BUAP) |
| — | FW | MEX | Josué Mercado (to (Venezuela) Monagas, previously on loan at Zacatecas) |

=== Puebla ===
In: Note: Flags indicate national team as defined under FIFA eligibility rules; some limited exceptions apply. Players may hold more than one non-FIFA nationality.

| No. | Pos. | Nation | Player |
|---|---|---|---|
| 6 | FW | MEX | Daniel Lajud (on loan from Monterrey, previously on loan at Querétaro) |
| 32 | GK | MEX | Tirso Trueba (loan return from (Spain) Toledo) |

Out: Note: Flags indicate national team as defined under FIFA eligibility rules; some limited exceptions apply. Players may hold more than one non-FIFA nationality.

| No. | Pos. | Nation | Player |
|---|---|---|---|
| 14 | FW | MEX | Alonso Escoboza (loan return to Tijuana) |
| 300 | DF | MEX | Vladimir Loroña (to Tijuana) |
| — | FW | MEX | Aldo Magaña (to (Costa Rica) Herediano, previously at León) |

=== Querétaro ===
In: Note: Flags indicate national team as defined under FIFA eligibility rules; some limited exceptions apply. Players may hold more than one non-FIFA nationality.

| No. | Pos. | Nation | Player |
|---|---|---|---|
| 4 | DF | MEX | Jair Pereira (from Guadalajara) |
| 10 | MF | GHA | Clifford Aboagye (on loan from Atlas) |
| 11 | FW | ECU | Fabián Castillo (from Tijuana) |
| 20 | MF | COL | Jeison Lucumí (on loan from UANL) |
| 22 | FW | MEX | Alonso Escoboza (from Tijuana, previously on loan at Puebla) |

Out: Note: Flags indicate national team as defined under FIFA eligibility rules; some limited exceptions apply. Players may hold more than one non-FIFA nationality.

| No. | Pos. | Nation | Player |
|---|---|---|---|
| 13 | FW | MEX | Daniel Lajud (loan return to Monterrey) |
| 24 | FW | PAR | Jorge Rojas (to Tijuana) |
| 26 | MF | MEX | Erbín Trejo (on loan to Zacatepec) |

=== Santos Laguna ===
In: Note: Flags indicate national team as defined under FIFA eligibility rules; some limited exceptions apply. Players may hold more than one non-FIFA nationality.

| No. | Pos. | Nation | Player |
|---|---|---|---|
| 3 | DF | MEX | Oscar Bernal (loan return from (Colombia) La Equidad) |
| 11 | MF | URU | Fernando Gorriarán (from (Hungary) Ferencváros) |
| 13 | FW | ECU | Erick Castillo (from (Ecuador) Barcelona, previously on loan at Tijuana) |
| 29 | FW | URU | Octavio Rivero (from (Uruguay) Nacional) |

Out: Note: Flags indicate national team as defined under FIFA eligibility rules; some limited exceptions apply. Players may hold more than one non-FIFA nationality.

| No. | Pos. | Nation | Player |
|---|---|---|---|
| 4 | DF | MEX | Jesús A. Angulo (on loan to Atlas) |
| 5 | DF | ARG | Hugo Nervo (on loan to Atlas) |
| 24 | FW | ARG | Javier Correa (on loan to Atlas) |
| — | MF | MEX | Óscar Arce (on loan to (Costa Rica) Herediano, previously on loan at (Costa Rica) Guadalupe) |
| — | FW | MEX | Joao Maleck (released, previously on loan at (Spain) Sevilla Atlético) |
| — | FW | COL | Mauricio Cuero (to Atlas, previously on loan at (Argentina) Belgrano) |

=== Tijuana ===
In: Note: Flags indicate national team as defined under FIFA eligibility rules; some limited exceptions apply. Players may hold more than one non-FIFA nationality.

| No. | Pos. | Nation | Player |
|---|---|---|---|
| 9 | FW | MEX | Ángel Sepúlveda (from Necaxa) |
| 11 | DF | URU | Washington Camacho (from (Argentina) Rosario Central) |
| 17 | FW | PAR | Jorge Rojas (from Querétaro) |
| 18 | FW | MEX | Aldo Cruz (from América, previously on loan at BUAP) |
| 20 | MF | MEX | Mauro Lainez (on loan from Pachuca, previously on loan at BUAP) |
| 22 | DF | MEX | Vladimir Loroña (from Puebla) |
| 33 | MF | ARG | Leonel Miranda (from (Argentina) Defensa y Justicia) |

Out: Note: Flags indicate national team as defined under FIFA eligibility rules; some limited exceptions apply. Players may hold more than one non-FIFA nationality.

| No. | Pos. | Nation | Player |
|---|---|---|---|
| 7 | FW | ARG | Gustavo Bou (to (United States) New England Revolution) |
| 10 | FW | COL | Fabián Castillo (to Querétaro) |
| 11 | FW | ECU | Erick Castillo (loan return to (Ecuador) Barcelona) |
| 14 | MF | USA | Joe Corona (to (United States) LA Galaxy) |
| 20 | MF | MEX | Jesús R. Angulo (to Necaxa) |
| 24 | MF | MEX | Luis Chávez (to Pachuca) |
| 30 | DF | MEX | Hiram Muñoz (on loan to Sinaloa) |
| — | GK | USA | Carlos López (to (United States) Orange County) |
| — | DF | USA | Michael Orozco (to (United States) Orange County, previously on loan at BUAP) |
| — | FW | MEX | Alonso Escoboza (to Querétaro, previously on loan at Puebla) |

=== Toluca ===
In: Note: Flags indicate national team as defined under FIFA eligibility rules; some limited exceptions apply. Players may hold more than one non-FIFA nationality.

| No. | Pos. | Nation | Player |
|---|---|---|---|
| 6 | DF | ECU | Aníbal Chalá (from (Ecuador) LDU Quito) |
| 10 | MF | BRA | Diego Rigonato (from (United Arab Emirates) Al Dhafra) |
| 26 | DF | ARG | Gastón Sauro (from (United States) Columbus Crew) |
| 30 | DF | MEX | Luis Hernández (from Necaxa) |

Out: Note: Flags indicate national team as defined under FIFA eligibility rules; some limited exceptions apply. Players may hold more than one non-FIFA nationality.

| No. | Pos. | Nation | Player |
|---|---|---|---|
| 4 | DF | CHI | Osvaldo González (to Universidad de Chile) |
| 7 | FW | MEX | Luis Ángel Mendoza (to Morelia) |
| 10 | MF | MEX | Leonel López (to América) |
| 11 | FW | MEX | Carlos Esquivel (to UAEM) |
| 13 | DF | MEX | Héctor Acosta (to Venados) |
| 21 | FW | ARG | Enrique Triverio (to Querétaro) |
| 24 | MF | ARG | Pablo Barrientos (to (Uruguay) Nacional) |
| — | MF | MEX | Juan Delgadillo (released, previously on loan at (Costa Rica) Cartaginés) |

=== UANL ===
In: Note: Flags indicate national team as defined under FIFA eligibility rules; some limited exceptions apply. Players may hold more than one non-FIFA nationality.

| No. | Pos. | Nation | Player |
|---|---|---|---|
| 16 | DF | MEX | Diego Reyes (from (Turkey) Fenerbahçe) |
| — | FW | MEX | Omar Pánuco (on loan from Juárez) |

Out: Note: Flags indicate national team as defined under FIFA eligibility rules; some limited exceptions apply. Players may hold more than one non-FIFA nationality.

| No. | Pos. | Nation | Player |
|---|---|---|---|
| — | MF | MEX | Alberto Acosta (on loan to Juárez, previously on loan at Morelia) |
| — | MF | ECU | Jefferson Intriago (from (Ecuador) LDU Quito, later loaned to Juárez) |

=== UNAM ===
In: Note: Flags indicate national team as defined under FIFA eligibility rules; some limited exceptions apply. Players may hold more than one non-FIFA nationality.

| No. | Pos. | Nation | Player |
|---|---|---|---|
| 18 | DF | ARG | Nicolás Freire (on loan from (Uruguay) Torque) |
| 21 | MF | MEX | Martín Barragán (on loan from Necaxa) |
| 22 | MF | MEX | Juan Pablo Vigón (from Atlas) |

Out: Note: Flags indicate national team as defined under FIFA eligibility rules; some limited exceptions apply. Players may hold more than one non-FIFA nationality.

| No. | Pos. | Nation | Player |
|---|---|---|---|
| 18 | MF | MEX | Carlos Gutiérrez (on loan to Atlético San Luis) |

=== Veracruz ===
In: Note: Flags indicate national team as defined under FIFA eligibility rules; some limited exceptions apply. Players may hold more than one non-FIFA nationality.

| No. | Pos. | Nation | Player |
|---|---|---|---|
| 10 | MF | MEX | Ángel Reyna (on loan from Celaya) |
| 23 | DF | MEX | Leobardo López (loan return from Zacatepec) |

Out: Note: Flags indicate national team as defined under FIFA eligibility rules; some limited exceptions apply. Players may hold more than one non-FIFA nationality.

| No. | Pos. | Nation | Player |
|---|---|---|---|
| 14 | DF | ARG | Rodrigo Noya (to Necaxa) |
| 21 | MF | URU | Adrián Luna (to (Australia) Melbourne City) |
| 30 | DF | MEX | Edson García (loan return to Atlas) |

== Ascenso MX ==
=== Atlante ===
In: Note: Flags indicate national team as defined under FIFA eligibility rules; some limited exceptions apply. Players may hold more than one non-FIFA nationality.

| No. | Pos. | Nation | Player |
|---|---|---|---|
| — | GK | URU | Sebastián Britos (from (Uruguay) Juventud de Las Piedras) |
| — | DF | URU | Martín Rea (on loan from (Uruguay) Danubio) |
| — | DF | MEX | Erik Vera (from Oaxaca) |
| — | MF | MEX | Taufic Guarch (from Oaxaca) |
| — | MF | MEX | Javier Ibarra (on loan from Monterrey) |
| — | MF | URU | Santiago Martínez (on loan from (Uruguay) Montevideo Wanderers) |
| — | MF | MEX | Pedro Vargas (from Tampico Madero) |
| — | MF | MEX | Irving Zurita (loan return from Atlas) |
| — | FW | URU | Sebastián Sosa (from (Uruguay) Cerro Largo) |

Out: Note: Flags indicate national team as defined under FIFA eligibility rules; some limited exceptions apply. Players may hold more than one non-FIFA nationality.

| No. | Pos. | Nation | Player |

=== Celaya ===
In: Note: Flags indicate national team as defined under FIFA eligibility rules; some limited exceptions apply. Players may hold more than one non-FIFA nationality.

| No. | Pos. | Nation | Player |

Out: Note: Flags indicate national team as defined under FIFA eligibility rules; some limited exceptions apply. Players may hold more than one non-FIFA nationality.

| No. | Pos. | Nation | Player |
|---|---|---|---|
| 35 | GK | MEX | Nemer Lajud (loan return to Sinaloa) |
| — | MF | MEX | Ángel Reyna (on loan to Veracruz) |

=== Chiapas ===
In: Note: Flags indicate national team as defined under FIFA eligibility rules; some limited exceptions apply. Players may hold more than one non-FIFA nationality.

| No. | Pos. | Nation | Player |
|---|---|---|---|
| 6 | DF | BRA | Massari (from Juárez) |

Out: Note: Flags indicate national team as defined under FIFA eligibility rules; some limited exceptions apply. Players may hold more than one non-FIFA nationality.

| No. | Pos. | Nation | Player |

=== Oaxaca ===
In: Note: Flags indicate national team as defined under FIFA eligibility rules; some limited exceptions apply. Players may hold more than one non-FIFA nationality.

| No. | Pos. | Nation | Player |
|---|---|---|---|
| — | DF | MEX | Giovanni León (on loan from Atlas) |

Out: Note: Flags indicate national team as defined under FIFA eligibility rules; some limited exceptions apply. Players may hold more than one non-FIFA nationality.

| No. | Pos. | Nation | Player |
|---|---|---|---|
| 10 | MF | MEX | Alfonso Sánchez (loan return to América) |
| 15 | DF | MEX | Érik Vera (to Atlante) |
| 20 | MF | MEX | Juan Carlos López (to Zacatepec) |
| 21 | MF | MEX | Taufic Guarch (to Atlante) |

=== Sinaloa ===
In: Note: Flags indicate national team as defined under FIFA eligibility rules; some limited exceptions apply. Players may hold more than one non-FIFA nationality.

| No. | Pos. | Nation | Player |
|---|---|---|---|
| — | DF | MEX | Hiram Muñoz (on loan from Tijuana) |

Out: Note: Flags indicate national team as defined under FIFA eligibility rules; some limited exceptions apply. Players may hold more than one non-FIFA nationality.

| No. | Pos. | Nation | Player |
|---|---|---|---|
| 2 | DF | MEX | Diego Barbosa (loan return to Atlas) |
| 7 | FW | MEX | Édson Rivera (loan return to Atlas) |
| — | GK | MEX | Nemer Lajud (to (Lebanon) Al-Ansar, previously on loan at Celaya) |

=== Sonora ===
In: Note: Flags indicate national team as defined under FIFA eligibility rules; some limited exceptions apply. Players may hold more than one non-FIFA nationality.

| No. | Pos. | Nation | Player |

Out: Note: Flags indicate national team as defined under FIFA eligibility rules; some limited exceptions apply. Players may hold more than one non-FIFA nationality.

| No. | Pos. | Nation | Player |

=== Tampico Madero ===
In: Note: Flags indicate national team as defined under FIFA eligibility rules; some limited exceptions apply. Players may hold more than one non-FIFA nationality.

| No. | Pos. | Nation | Player |
|---|---|---|---|
| 4 | DF | MEX | Gaddi Aguirre (re-loan from Atlas) |
| — | DF | MEX | Edson García (on loan from Atlas, previously on loan at Veracruz) |
| — | MF | MEX | José Ávila (on loan from Atlas) |
| — | MF | MEX | Edyairth Ortega (on loan from Atlas) |
| — | MF | ARG | Leandro Torres (on loan from Atlético San Luis) |

Out: Note: Flags indicate national team as defined under FIFA eligibility rules; some limited exceptions apply. Players may hold more than one non-FIFA nationality.

| No. | Pos. | Nation | Player |
|---|---|---|---|
| 11 | FW | MEX | Eduardo Pérez (to Juárez) |
| 30 | FW | MEX | Pedro Vargas (to Atlante) |

=== UAEM ===
In: Note: Flags indicate national team as defined under FIFA eligibility rules; some limited exceptions apply. Players may hold more than one non-FIFA nationality.

| No. | Pos. | Nation | Player |
|---|---|---|---|
| 11 | FW | MEX | Carlos Esquivel (from Toluca) |

Out: Note: Flags indicate national team as defined under FIFA eligibility rules; some limited exceptions apply. Players may hold more than one non-FIFA nationality.

| No. | Pos. | Nation | Player |
|---|---|---|---|
| 8 | MF | MEX | Édgar Solís (to (Nicaragua) Real Estelí) |

=== UAT ===
In: Note: Flags indicate national team as defined under FIFA eligibility rules; some limited exceptions apply. Players may hold more than one non-FIFA nationality.

| No. | Pos. | Nation | Player |
|---|---|---|---|
| — | DF | MEX | Kevin Gutiérrez (from Juárez) |

Out: Note: Flags indicate national team as defined under FIFA eligibility rules; some limited exceptions apply. Players may hold more than one non-FIFA nationality.

| No. | Pos. | Nation | Player |
|---|---|---|---|
| 12 | DF | PAN | Fidel Escobar (loan return to (Panama) Sporting San Miguelito) |
| 27 | FW | PAR | Gustavo Ramírez (loan return to Zacatecas) |
| — | MF | MEX | Javier Hurtado (to (Costa Rica) Pérez Zeledón) |

=== UdeC ===
In: Note: Flags indicate national team as defined under FIFA eligibility rules; some limited exceptions apply. Players may hold more than one non-FIFA nationality.

| No. | Pos. | Nation | Player |

Out: Note: Flags indicate national team as defined under FIFA eligibility rules; some limited exceptions apply. Players may hold more than one non-FIFA nationality.

| No. | Pos. | Nation | Player |

=== UdeG ===
In: Note: Flags indicate national team as defined under FIFA eligibility rules; some limited exceptions apply. Players may hold more than one non-FIFA nationality.

| No. | Pos. | Nation | Player |

Out: Note: Flags indicate national team as defined under FIFA eligibility rules; some limited exceptions apply. Players may hold more than one non-FIFA nationality.

| No. | Pos. | Nation | Player |

=== Venados ===
In: Note: Flags indicate national team as defined under FIFA eligibility rules; some limited exceptions apply. Players may hold more than one non-FIFA nationality.

| No. | Pos. | Nation | Player |
|---|---|---|---|
| — | DF | MEX | Richard Okunorobo (from (Panama) Universitario) |

Out: Note: Flags indicate national team as defined under FIFA eligibility rules; some limited exceptions apply. Players may hold more than one non-FIFA nationality.

| No. | Pos. | Nation | Player |
|---|---|---|---|
| 2 | DF | MEX | Bryan Colula (loan return to América) |

=== Zacatecas ===
In: Note: Flags indicate national team as defined under FIFA eligibility rules; some limited exceptions apply. Players may hold more than one non-FIFA nationality.

| No. | Pos. | Nation | Player |

Out: Note: Flags indicate national team as defined under FIFA eligibility rules; some limited exceptions apply. Players may hold more than one non-FIFA nationality.

| No. | Pos. | Nation | Player |
|---|---|---|---|
| 18 | FW | MEX | Josué Mercado (loan return to Pachuca) |
| 23 | MF | MEX | Francisco Rivera (to (Venezuela) Monagas) |
| — | FW | PAR | Gustavo Ramírez (on loan to Zacatepec, previously on loan at UAT) |

=== Zacatepec ===
In: Note: Flags indicate national team as defined under FIFA eligibility rules; some limited exceptions apply. Players may hold more than one non-FIFA nationality.

| No. | Pos. | Nation | Player |
|---|---|---|---|
| — | DF | MEX | Tony Alfaro (on loan from Guadalajara) |
| — | DF | MEX | Bryan Colula (on loan from América, previously on loan at Venados) |
| — | DF | MEX | Oswaldo León (on loan from América) |
| — | DF | MEX | Daniel Zamora (on loan from América) |
| — | MF | MEX | José Hernández (on loan from América) |
| — | MF | MEX | Juan Carlos López (from Oaxaca) |
| — | MF | MEX | Iván Moreno (on loan from América) |
| — | MF | MEX | Carlos Ochoa (on loan from Guadalajara) |
| — | MF | MEX | Alfonso Sánchez (on loan from América, previously on loan at Oaxaca) |
| — | MF | MEX | Erbín Trejo (on loan from Querétaro) |
| — | FW | PAR | Gustavo Ramírez (on loan from Zacatecas, previously on loan at UAT) |

Out: Note: Flags indicate national team as defined under FIFA eligibility rules; some limited exceptions apply. Players may hold more than one non-FIFA nationality.

| No. | Pos. | Nation | Player |
|---|---|---|---|
| 5 | DF | MEX | Leobardo López (loan return to Veracruz) |
