= 2018–19 Atlas F.C. season =

Atlas
2018–19 season
- Chairman: Gustavo Guzmán
- Manager: Ángel Guillermo Hoyos
- Stadium: Estadio Jalisco
- Apertura: 17th
- Clausura: 4th
- Apertura Copa MX: Group stage
- Clausura Copa MX: Group stage
- Top goalscorer: League: Jefferson Duque (5 goals); All: Jefferson Duque (7 goals)
- Highest home attendance: 46,056 (vs América, 11 January 2019)
- Lowest home attendance: 11,568 (vs Zacatepec, 25 July 2018)
- Biggest win: Atlas 2–0 Toluca (28 September 2018)
- Biggest defeat: Atlas 0–3 UNAM (3 August 2018)
Home colours	Away colours
- All statistics correct as of 27 January 2019.

The 2018–19 Atlas F.C. season is the 89th season in the football club's history and the 49th consecutive season in the top flight of Mexican football.

== Coaching staff ==
Position	Name
Head coach	(Argentina) Ángel Guillermo Hoyos
Assistant coach	(Mexico) Raúl Chabrand
Fitness coaches	(Mexico) Eric Secada
Fitness coaches	(Argentina) Sebastián Fabres
Fitness coaches	(Mexico) Vicente Espadas
Kinesiologist	(Mexico) Eder Fiol
Doctors	(Mexico) José Gutiérrez

== Players ==
=== Squad information ===
No.	Pos.	Nat.	Name	Date of birth (age)	Signed in	Signed from
Goalkeepers
1	GK	(Mexico)	José Santiago Hernández	1 May 1997 (age 29)	2016 (Winter)	(Mexico) Youth System
12	GK	(Mexico)	Jonathan Estrada	16 March 1998 (age 28)	2017	(Mexico) Youth System
23	GK	(Mexico)	Édgar Hernández	27 August 1982 (age 44)	2018	(Mexico) Oaxaca
Defenders
2	DF	(Argentina)	Nicolás Pareja	19 January 1984 (age 42)	2018	(Spain) Sevilla
3	DF	(Colombia)	Leiton Jiménez (2nd VC)	26 April 1989 (age 37)	2016	(Mexico) Tijuana
5	DF	(Mexico)	Gaddi Aguirre	31 March 1996 (age 30)	2016 (Winter)	(Mexico) Youth System
14	DF	(United States)	Omar Gonzalez	11 October 1988 (age 38)	2018	(Mexico) Pachuca
16	DF	(Mexico)	Heriberto Olvera	13 May 1990 (age 36)	2018	(Mexico) BUAP
24	DF	(Mexico)	Osvaldo González	26 February 1998 (age 28)	2017 (Winter)	(Mexico) Youth System
26	DF	(Mexico)	Cristian Calderón	24 May 1997 (age 29)	2016 (Winter)	(Mexico) Youth System
29	DF	(Mexico)	Ismael Govea	20 February 1997 (age 29)	2018 (Winter)	(Mexico) Youth System
30	DF	(Mexico)	Edson García	1 March 1998 (age 28)	2018	(Mexico) Youth System
Midfielders
6	MF	(Mexico)	Edgar Zaldívar	17 October 1996 (age 30)	2016	(Mexico) Youth System
7	MF	(Mexico)	Juan Pablo Vigón (Captain)	20 July 1991 (age 35)	2017	(Mexico) Tapachula
8	MF	(Colombia)	Andrés Andrade	23 February 1989 (age 37)	2018	(Mexico) León
10	MF	(Ghana)	Clifford Aboagye	11 February 1995 (age 31)	2017 (Winter)	(Spain) Granada
11	MF	(Argentina)	Ricky Álvarez	12 April 1988 (age 38)	2018	(Italy) Sampdoria
13	MF	(Mexico)	Ulises Cardona	13 November 1998 (age 27)	2017	(Mexico) Youth System
15	MF	(Mexico)	Bryan Garnica	27 May 1996 (age 30)	2015	(Mexico) Youth System
20	MF	(Mexico)	Jairo Torres	5 July 2000 (age 26)	2018 (Winter)	(Mexico) Youth System
21	MF	(Chile)	Lorenzo Reyes	13 June 1991 (age 35)	2018	Universidad de Chile
25	MF	(Mexico)	José Ávila	5 January 1998 (age 28)	2017	(Mexico) Youth System
27	MF	(Mexico)	Edyairth Ortega	23 January 1997 (age 29)	2018 (Winter)	(Mexico) Youth System
28	MF	(Cameroon)	Patrick Soko	31 October 1997 (age 29)	2017	(Dominican Republic) Cibao
Forwards
17	FW	(Colombia)	Jefferson Duque	17 May 1987 (age 39)	2018	(Mexico) Morelia
18	FW	(Mexico)	Alejandro Díaz	27 January 1996 (age 30)	2018	(Mexico) América
19	FW	(Uruguay)	Octavio Rivero	24 January 1992 (age 34)	2018	(Chile) Colo-Colo

Players and squad numbers last updated on 28 October 2018.
Note: Flags indicate national team as has been defined under FIFA eligibility rules. Players may hold more than one non-FIFA nationality.

== Transfers ==
=== In ===
No.	Pos.	Nat.	Name	Age	Moving from	Type	Transfer window	Ends	Transfer fee	Source
2	DF	(Argentina)	Nicolás Pareja	34	(Spain) Sevilla	Transfer	Summer	2020	Free	Milenio
8	MF	(Colombia)	Andrés Andrade	29	León	Loan	Summer	2018	Free	Récord
11	MF	(Argentina)	Ricky Álvarez	30	(Italy) Sampdoria	Transfer	Summer	2021	Free	Milenio
14	DF	(United States)	Omar Gonzalez	29	Pachuca	Loan	Summer	2018	Free	AS
16	DF	(Mexico)	Heriberto Olvera	28	BUAP	Loan	Summer	2018	Free	Atlas FC
17	FW	(Colombia)	Jefferson Duque	31	Morelia	End of Loan	Summer	Undisclosed	Free	AS
18	FW	(Mexico)	Alejandro Díaz	22	América	Loan	Summer	2018	Free	Atlas FC
19	FW	(Uruguay)	Octavio Rivero	26	(Chile) Colo-Colo	Transfer	Summer	2022	€3.42M	Atlas FC
21	MF	(Chile)	Lorenzo Reyes	27	Universidad de Chile	Transfer	Summer	2021	Free	Atlas FC
23	GK	(Mexico)	Édgar Hernández	36	Oaxaca	Loan	Summer	2018	Free	Atlas FC

=== Out ===
No.	Pos.	Nat.	Name	Age	Moving to	Type	Transfer window	Transfer fee	Source
1	GK	(Argentina)	Óscar Ustari	32	Unattached	Released	Summer	Free	ESPN
2	DF	(Colombia)	Stiven Barreiro	24	Pachuca	Loan	Summer	Free	ESPN
4	DF	(Mexico)	Rafael Márquez	39	Retirement	Retired	Summer		

== Competitions ==
=== Overview ===
Competition	First match	Last match	Starting round	Final position	Record							
Competition	First match	Last match	Starting round	Final position	Pld	W	D	L	GF	GA	GD	Win %
Torneo Apertura	20 July 2018		Matchday 1		17	2	5	10	11	27	−16	11.76
Apertura Copa MX	25 July 2018	13 September 2018	Group stage	Group stage	4	1	1	2	6	7	−1	25.00
Torneo Clausura	5 January 2019		Matchday 1		4	2	1	1	8	6	+2	50.00
Clausura Copa MX	8 January 2019		Group stage		2	1	0	1	2	2	+0	50.00
Total					27	6	7	14	27	42	−15	22.22

Last updated: 27 January 2019
Source: Mediotiempo.com

=== Torneo Apertura ===
==== League table ====
Pos	Team	Pld	W	D	L	GF	GA	GD	Pts	Qualification or relegation
14	León	17	5	3	9	18	23	−5	18	
15	Tijuana	17	4	5	8	13	24	−11	17	
16	Necaxa	17	3	5	9	19	29	−10	14	
17	Atlas	17	2	5	10	11	27	−16	11	
18	Veracruz	17	2	4	11	17	40	−23	10	Team is last in Relegation table

Source: Liga MX
Rules for classification: 1) Points; 2) Goal difference; 3) Number of goals scored; 4) Head-to-head results between tied teams; 5) Number of goals scored away; 6) Highest relegation coefficient; 7) Fair Play points

==== Results summary ====
Overall								Home						Away					
Pld	W	D	L	GF	GA	GD	Pts	W	D	L	GF	GA	GD	W	D	L	GF	GA	GD
17	2	5	10	11	27	−16	11	2	3	4	6	9	−3	0	2	6	5	18	−13

Last updated: 26 November 2018.
Source: LigaMX

==== Result round by round ====
Round	1	2	3	4	5	6	7	8	9	10	11	12	13	14	15	16	17
Ground	H	A	H	A	H	A	H	A	H	A	H	A	H	A	H	H	A
Result	D	L	L	D	L	L	L	L	L	L	W	L	W	D	D	D	L
Position	9	14	17	16	18	18	18	18	18	18	18	18	18	17	17	17	17

Updated to match(es) played on 26 November 2018. Source: LigaMX
A = Away; H = Home; W = Win; D = Draw; L = Loss

==== Matches ====
20 July 2018 1	Atlas	0–0	Querétaro	Guadalajara
21:00		Report		Stadium: Jalisco; Attendance: 31,810; Referee: Fernando Hernández Gómez

28 July 2018 2	América	3–0	Atlas	Mexico City
19:00	Rodríguez 33', 53'; Uribe 39'	Report		Stadium: Azteca; Attendance: 25,578; Referee: Adonai Escobedo

3 August 2018 3	Atlas	0–3	UNAM	Guadalajara
21:00		Report	Escamilla 15'; Barrera 21'; Alustiza 86'	Stadium: Jalisco; Attendance: 40,207; Referee: Jorge Antonio Pérez Durán

11 August 2018 4	BUAP	0–0	Atlas	Puebla
17:00		Report		Stadium: Universitario BUAP; Attendance: 7,346; Referee: Oscar Macías Romo

17 August 2018 5	Atlas	0–1	Morelia	Guadalajara
21:00		Report	Ávila 8'	Stadium: Jalisco; Attendance: 20,987; Referee: Marco Antonio Ortiz Nava

21 August 2018 6	Puebla	2–0	Atlas	Puebla
21:00	Chumacero 20'; Arreola 70'	Report		Stadium: Cuauhtémoc; Attendance: 10,580; Referee: Eduardo Galván Basulto

24 August 2018 7	Atlas	0–1	Guadalajara	Guadalajara
21:00		Report	Pineda 63'	Stadium: Jalisco; Attendance: 37,921; Referee: César Arturo Ramos

1 September 2018 8	UANL	3–1	Atlas	San Nicolás de los Garza
19:00	Torres Nilo 66'; Gignac 74'; Valencia 85'	Report	Andrade 1'	Stadium: Universitario; Attendance: 41,363; Referee: Francisco Chacón

16 September 2018 9	Atlas	0–1	Tijuana	Guadalajara
18:00		Report	Fuentes 55'	Stadium: Jalisco; Attendance: 22,057; Referee: Fernando Hernández Gómez

22 September 2018 10	Cruz Azul	2–0	Atlas	Mexico City
19:00	Aldrete 17'; Caraglio 56'	Report		Stadium: Azteca; Attendance: 18,541; Referee: Diego Montaño Robles

28 September 2018 11	Atlas	2–0	Toluca	Guadalajara
21:00	Duque 31'; Cardona 78'	Report		Stadium: Jalisco; Attendance: 15,441; Referee: Adonai Escobedo

5 October 2018 12	Santos Laguna	3–1	Atlas	Torreón
19:00	Furch 17'; Martínez 47'; Rodríguez 56'	Report	González 49'	Stadium: Corona; Attendance: 20,854; Referee: Jorge Antonio Pérez Durán

19 October 2018 13	Atlas	4–3	Veracruz	Guadalajara
21:00	Andrade 15'; Duque 40'; Vigón 65'; Gonzalez 90+1'	Report	Menéndez 2', 82'; Carrasco 33'	Stadium: Jalisco; Attendance: 14,216; Referee: Adonai Escobedo

27 October 2018 14	Necaxa	2–2	Atlas	Aguascalientes
17:00	Pérez 60'; Fernández 69'	Report	Duque 24', 86'	Stadium: Victoria; Referee: Luis Enrique Santander

4 November 2018 15	Atlas	0–0	León	Guadalajara
18:00		Report		Stadium: Jalisco; Attendance: 16,418; Referee: Francisco Chacón

9 November 2018 16	Atlas	0–0	Pachuca	Guadalajara
21:00		Report		Stadium: Jalisco; Attendance: 15,114; Referee: Diego Montaño

24 November 2018 17	Monterrey	3–1	Atlas	Guadalupe
21:06	Sánchez 25'; Funes Mori 56'; Madrigal 79'	Report	Duque 87'	Stadium: BBVA Bancomer; Attendance: 31,758; Referee: Roberto García Orozco

=== Apertura Copa MX ===
==== Group stage ====
Pos	Team	Pld	W	D	L	GF	GA	GD	Pts	Qualification
1	Cruz Azul	4	2	1	1	7	5	+2	7	Advance to knockout stage
2	Zacatepec	4	2	0	2	7	8	−1	6	Advance to knockout stage
3	Atlas	4	1	1	2	6	7	−1	4	

Source: Copa MX
Rules for classification: Tiebreakers

25 July 2018 1	Atlas	1–2	Zacatepec	Guadalajara
21:00	Trejo 75'	Report	Hernández 12'; Macías 87'	Stadium: Jalisco; Attendance: 11,568; Referee: Alejandro Funk

8 August 2018 2	Cruz Azul	2–2	Atlas	Mexico City
19:00	Caraglio 30'; Alvarado 35'	Report	Rivero 44', 76'	Stadium: Azteca; Attendance: 16,225; Referee: Jorge Isaac Rojas

29 August 2018 3	Atlas	1–0	Cruz Azul	Guadalajara
21:00	Vigón 32'	Report		Stadium: Jalisco; Attendance: 24,670; Referee: Oscar Mejía

13 September 2018 4	Zacatepec	3–2	Atlas	Zacatepec
19:00	Macías 41'; Valdivia 82'; Cisneros 86' (pen.)	Report	Duque 29', 44'	Stadium: Agustín "Coruco" Díaz; Attendance: 4,380; Referee: Ivan Asael Martínez

=== Torneo Clausura ===
==== League table ====
Pos	Team	Pld	W	D	L	GF	GA	GD	Pts
11	Santos Laguna	17	6	4	7	21	23	−2	22
12	BUAP	17	6	2	9	17	34	−17	20
13	Atlas	17	6	1	10	19	28	−9	19
14	Guadalajara	17	5	3	9	16	21	−5	18
15	Pumas UNAM	17	4	5	8	19	26	−7	17

Source: Liga MX
Rules for classification: 1) Points; 2) Goal difference; 3) Number of goals scored; 4) Head-to-head results between tied teams; 5) Number of goals scored away; 6) Highest relegation coefficient; 7) Fair Play points

==== Results summary ====
Overall								Home						Away					
Pld	W	D	L	GF	GA	GD	Pts	W	D	L	GF	GA	GD	W	D	L	GF	GA	GD
4	2	1	1	8	6	+2	7	1	0	1	4	3	+1	1	1	0	4	3	+1

Last updated: 27 January 2019.
Source: LigaMX

==== Result round by round ====
Round	1	2	3	4	5	6	7	8	9	10	11	12	13	14	15	16	17
Ground	A	H	A	H	A	H	A	H	A	H	A	H	A	H	A	A	H
Result	W	L	D	W													
Position	5	8	8	4													

Updated to match(es) played on 27 January 2019. Source: LigaMX
A = Away; H = Home; W = Win; D = Draw; L = Loss

==== Matches ====
5 January 2019 1	Querétaro	1–2	Atlas	Querétaro City
17:00	Sanvezzo 40'	Report	Isijara 41'; Martínez 49'	Stadium: Estadio Corregidora; Attendance: 15,134; Referee: Oscar Macías

11 January 2019 2	Atlas	1–2	América	Guadalajara
21:00	Martín 56'; Domínguez 68'	Report	Martínez 89'	Stadium: Estadio Jalisco; Attendance: 46,056; Referee: Jorge Antonio Pérez Durán

20 January 2019 3	UNAM	2–2	Atlas	Mexico City
12:00	Malcorra 23'; Mora 30'	Report	Vigón 57', 90+1'	Stadium: Estadio Olímpico Universitario; Attendance: 17,425; Referee: Adonai Escobedo

25 January 2019 4	Atlas	3–1	BUAP	Guadalajara
21:00	Santamaría 42'; Barceló 74'; Aboagye 83'	Report	Rabello 85'	Stadium: Estadio Jalisco; Attendance: 19,901; Referee: Diego Montaño

1 February 2019 5	Morelia	1–2	Atlas	Morelia
19:00 CST	Rocha (yellow card) 77'; Lezcano 80'	Report	Isijara 62'; Barceló 85'; Zaldívar (yellow card) 86'	Stadium: Estadio Morelos; Referee: Francisco Chacón Gutiérrez

8 February 2019 6	Atlas	1–2	Puebla	Guadalajara
21:00	Isijara 15'; Barceló (yellow card) 30'; Burbano (yellow card) 64'	Report	Zavala (yellow card) 2'; Tabó 37'; Vikonis (yellow card) 66'; Alustiza 88', (yellow card) 89'; Arreola (yellow card) 90'	Stadium: Estadio Jalisco; Referee: Erick Yair Miranda Galindo

16 February 2019 7	Guadalajara	3–0	Atlas	Zapopan
21:00	Vega 8', 23', (yellow card) 30', (goal) 61'; R. Cisneros (yellow card) 57'	Report	Zurita (yellow card) 30'; Pareja (yellow card) 40'; Vigón (yellow card) 84'	Stadium: Estadio Akron; Attendance: 34,648; Referee: Jorge Isaac Rojas

22 February 2019 8	Atlas	0–1	UANL	Guadalajara
21:00		Report	Gignac 90+2'	Stadium: Estadio Jalisco; Referee: Eduardo Galvan Basulto

1 March 2019 9	Tijuana	3–1	Atlas	Tijuana
19:06	E. Castillo 11'; Nahuelpan 13', 78'; Rodriguez (yellow card) 42'; Lajud (yellow card) 88'	Report	Torres (yellow card) 22'; Martínez 49'; Barceló (yellow card) 69'; Zurita (yellow card) 84'	Stadium: Estadio Caliente; Referee: Jorge Antonio Pérez Durán

8 March 2019 10	Atlas	0–2	Cruz Azul	Guadalajara
21:00 CST	Vigon (yellow card) 8' (yellow-red card) 90'; Martínez (yellow card) 90'	Report	J. Domínguez 14'; Yotún 52'	Stadium: Estadio Jalisco; Referee: Luis Enrique Santander Aguirre

17 March 2019 11	Toluca	2–0	Atlas	Toluca
12:00	Medina 28'; Gigliotti (yellow card) 48'; Mancuello (yellow card) 72'; Tobio (yellow card) 88'; Salinas (yellow card) 89', (goal) 90+5'	Report	Segura (yellow card) 68'	Stadium: Estadio Nemesio Díez; Referee: César Arturo Ramos Palazuelos

29 March 2019 12	Atlas	1–0	Santos Laguna	Guadalajara
21:00 CST	Govea (yellow card) 17'; Segura (yellow card) 22'; Díaz (yellow card) 24'; Santamaría (yellow card) 59'; Isijara (yellow card) 64', (goal) 84'	Report	Valdés (yellow card) 33'; Abella (yellow card) 75'	Stadium: Estadio Jalisco; Referee: Fernando Hernandez Gomez

5 April 2019 13	Veracruz	0–1	Atlas	Veracruz
19:00	Rodríguez (yellow card) 26'; Chávez (yellow card) 67'	Report	Santamaría (yellow card) 67'; Martínez (yellow card) 80'; Torres 88'	Stadium: Estadio Luis "Pirata" Fuente; Referee: Adonai Escobedo Gonzalez

12 April 2019 14	Atlas	1–2	Necaxa	Guadalajara
21:00 CST	Santamaría (yellow card) 44', (goal) 90+4'; Cufré (red card) 65'; Govea (yellow card) 77'; Andrade (red card) 85'	Report	F. González 25', (yellow card) 82'; Álvarez 69'; Meza (yellow card) 79'	Stadium: Estadio Jalisco; Referee: Oscar Mejia Garcia

20 April 2019 15	León	5–2	Atlas	León
17:00 CST	Mena 14', 61'; Herrera (yellow card) 19'; Tesillo 53'; Campbell (yellow card) 69'; Macías 78'; Montes 81', (yellow card) 85'	Report	Zurita (yellow card) 31'; Duque 60'; Zaldivar (yellow card) 62'; Martínez 68'; Santamaría (yellow card) 85'	Stadium: Estadio León; Referee: Fernando Guerrero Ramírez

27 April 2019 16	Pachuca	1–0	Atlas	Pachuca
19:00	Cardona 46'	Report	Andrade (red card) 7'; Segura (red card) 31'	Stadium: Hidalgo; Referee: Roberto Rios Jácome

3 May 2019 17	Atlas	2–0	Monterrey	Guadalajara
16:00	Torres 21', (yellow card) 77'; Martínez (yellow card) 57'; Vigon 87'	Report	Vangioni (yellow card) 9'; Hurtado (yellow card) 75'; Zaldívar (red card) 81'	Stadium: Estadio Jalisco; Referee: Francisco Chacón Gutiérrez

=== Clausura Copa MX ===
==== Group stage ====
Pos	Team	Pld	W	D	L	GF	GA	GD	Pts	Qualification
1	UNAM	4	3	0	1	6	3	+3	9	Advance to knockout stage
2	Atlas	4	2	0	2	7	6	+1	6	Advance to knockout stage
3	UdeG	4	1	1	2	5	9	−4	4	

Source: Copa MX
Rules for classification: Tiebreakers

8 January 2019 1	UNAM	0–1	Atlas	Mexico City
19:00		Report	Rivera 76'	Stadium: Estadio Olímpico Universitario; Attendance: 5,085; Referee: Eduardo Galván Basulto

22 January 2019 2	Atlas	1–2	UdeG	Guadalajara
21:00	Martínez 90'	Report	Quintero 28' (pen.); Ayala 70'	Stadium: Estadio Jalisco; Attendance: 20,684; Referee: Jonathan Hernández

== Statistics ==
=== Goals ===
As of 27 January 2019

Rank	Player	Position	Apertura	Ap. Copa MX	Clausura	Cl. Copa MX	Total
1	(Colombia) Jefferson Duque	FW	5	2	0	0	7
2	(Mexico) Juan Pablo Vigón	MF	1	1	2	0	4
3	(Paraguay) Osvaldo Martínez	MF	0	0	2	1	3
4	(Colombia) Andrés Andrade	MF	2	0	0	0	2
4	(United States) Omar Gonzalez	DF	2	0	0	0	2
4	(Uruguay) Octavio Rivero	FW	0	2	0	0	2
7	(Ghana) Clifford Aboagye	MF	0	0	1	0	1
7	(Uruguay) Facundo Barceló	FW	0	0	1	0	1
7	(Mexico) Ulises Cardona	MF	1	0	0	0	1
7	(Mexico) Jesús Isijara	MF	0	0	1	0	1
7	(Mexico) Rodolfo Rivera	FW	0	0	0	1	1
7	(Peru) Anderson Santamaría	DF	0	0	1	0	1
7	(Mexico) Christopher Trejo	FW	0	1	0	0	1
Total			9	5	8	2	24

=== Clean sheets ===
As of 27 January 2019

Rank	Name	Apertura	Ap. Copa MX	Clausura	Cl. Copa MX	Total
1	(Mexico) José Santiago Hernández	5	1	0	1	7
Total		5	1	0	1	7
