= List of Mexican football transfers winter 2020–21 =

This is a list of Mexican football transfers for the 2020–21 winter transfer window, grouped by club. It includes football transfers related to clubs from the Liga BBVA MX. This list no longer includes clubs from the Ascenso MX, as the league was abolished on April 24, 2020 due to the 2019–20 coronavirus pandemic and the league's lack of financial resources.

== Liga BBVA MX ==
=== América ===
In: Note: Flags indicate national team as defined under FIFA eligibility rules; some limited exceptions apply. Players may hold more than one non-FIFA nationality.

No.	Pos.	Nation	Player
5	MF	PER	Pedro Aquino (from León)
16	MF	MEX	Alan Medina (from Toluca)
28	MF	MEX	Mauro Lainez (on loan from Tijuana)
32	DF	MEX	Bryan Colula (loan return from Tijuana)

Out: Note: Flags indicate national team as defined under FIFA eligibility rules; some limited exceptions apply. Players may hold more than one non-FIFA nationality.

No.	Pos.	Nation	Player
5	MF	ARG	Santiago Cáseres (loan return to (Spain) Villarreal)
16	DF	MEX	Luis Reyes (to Atlas)
22	DF	MEX	Paul Aguilar (Unattached)
25	MF	MEX	Fernando González (to León)

=== Atlas ===
In: Note: Flags indicate national team as defined under FIFA eligibility rules; some limited exceptions apply. Players may hold more than one non-FIFA nationality.

No.	Pos.	Nation	Player
3	MF	MEX	Pablo González (from Puebla)
9	FW	ARG	Julio Furch (from Santos Laguna)
13	DF	MEX	Gaddi Aguirre (loan return from Tampico Madero)
16	DF	MEX	Luis Reyes (from América)
17	MF	MEX	Brayan Garnica (from Santos Laguna)
26	MF	MEX	Aldo Rocha (from Mazatlán)
—	FW	ARG	Milton Caraglio (on loan from Cruz Azul)

Out: Note: Flags indicate national team as defined under FIFA eligibility rules; some limited exceptions apply. Players may hold more than one non-FIFA nationality.

No.	Pos.	Nation	Player
9	FW	CHI	Ignacio Jeraldino (on loan to Santos Laguna)
21	MF	CHI	Lorenzo Reyes (to Mazatlán)
23	GK	MEX	Édgar Hernández (to Necaxa)
26	MF	MEX	Jesús Isijara (to Santos Laguna)
30	DF	ARG	Germán Conti (loan return to (Portugal) Benfica)
—	DF	MEX	Daniel Arreola (to (Costa Rica) Alajuelense, previously on loan at Puebla)
—	MF	MEX	Andrés Ávila (on loan to Santos Laguna, previously on loan at Tampico Madero)
—	MF	MEX	Ulises Cardona (on loan to Mazatlán, previously on loan at UANL)
—	FW	MEX	Eleuterio Jiménez (to Celaya, previously on loan at Tampico Madero)

=== Atlético San Luis ===
In: Note: Flags indicate national team as defined under FIFA eligibility rules; some limited exceptions apply. Players may hold more than one non-FIFA nationality.

No.	Pos.	Nation	Player
10	MF	ARG	Damián Batallini (on loan from (Argentina) Argentinos Juniors)
16	MF	MEX	Javier Güémez (on loan from Toluca)
20	MF	URU	Federico Gino (on loan from (Argentina) Aldosivi)
22	DF	MEX	Ricardo Chávez (from Necaxa)
23	FW	ARG	Lucas Passerini (on loan from Cruz Azul, previously on loan at Necaxa)
24	MF	COL	Jhon Duque (from (Colombia) Millonarios)

Out: Note: Flags indicate national team as defined under FIFA eligibility rules; some limited exceptions apply. Players may hold more than one non-FIFA nationality.

No.	Pos.	Nation	Player
4	DF	ARG	Matías Catalán (to Pachuca)
20	FW	ARG	Mauro Quiroga (to Pachuca)
—	FW	ESP	Ian (re-loan to Necaxa)

=== Cruz Azul ===
In: Note: Flags indicate national team as defined under FIFA eligibility rules; some limited exceptions apply. Players may hold more than one non-FIFA nationality.

No.	Pos.	Nation	Player

Out: Note: Flags indicate national team as defined under FIFA eligibility rules; some limited exceptions apply. Players may hold more than one non-FIFA nationality.

No.	Pos.	Nation	Player
9	FW	ARG	Milton Caraglio (on loan to Atlas)
—	FW	ARG	Lucas Passerini (on loan to Atlético San Luis, previously on loan at Necaxa)

=== Guadalajara ===
In: Note: Flags indicate national team as defined under FIFA eligibility rules; some limited exceptions apply. Players may hold more than one non-FIFA nationality.

No.	Pos.	Nation	Player
2	DF	MEX	Alejandro Mayorga (loan return from UNAM)
6	FW	MEX	César Huerta (loan return from Mazatlán)
33	MF	MEX	Carlos Cisneros (loan return from Toluca)

Out: Note: Flags indicate national team as defined under FIFA eligibility rules; some limited exceptions apply. Players may hold more than one non-FIFA nationality.

No.	Pos.	Nation	Player
6	MF	MEX	Dieter Villalpando (Unattached)
23	MF	MEX	José Juan Vázquez (on loan to Toluca)

=== Juárez ===
In: Note: Flags indicate national team as defined under FIFA eligibility rules; some limited exceptions apply. Players may hold more than one non-FIFA nationality.

No.	Pos.	Nation	Player
6	MF	MEX	Andrés Iniestra (on loan from UNAM)
—	DF	CHI	Luis Pavez (from (Chile) Unión Española)
—	FW	COL	Ayron del Valle (from (Colombia) Millonarios)

Out: Note: Flags indicate national team as defined under FIFA eligibility rules; some limited exceptions apply. Players may hold more than one non-FIFA nationality.

No.	Pos.	Nation	Player
11	MF	ARG	Mauro Fernández (loan return to UANL)
15	DF	URU	Maximiliano Olivera (loan return to (Italy) Fiorentina)
18	FW	MEX	Víctor Mañón (to Tepatitlán)
19	DF	CHI	Bruno Romo (Unattached)
22	MF	URU	Martín Rabuñal (loan return to (Uruguay) Defensor Sporting)

=== León ===
In: Note: Flags indicate national team as defined under FIFA eligibility rules; some limited exceptions apply. Players may hold more than one non-FIFA nationality.

No.	Pos.	Nation	Player
5	MF	CHI	Víctor Dávila (on loan from Pachuca)
27	MF	MEX	Fernando González (from América)
—	MF	ARG	Santiago Colombatto (on loan from (Belgium) Sint-Truiden)

Out: Note: Flags indicate national team as defined under FIFA eligibility rules; some limited exceptions apply. Players may hold more than one non-FIFA nationality.

No.	Pos.	Nation	Player
18	MF	PER	Pedro Aquino (to América)
35	DF	MEX	Ignacio González (Retired)
—	DF	CHI	Juan Cornejo (re-loan to (Chile) Universidad Católica)

=== Mazatlán ===
In: Note: Flags indicate national team as defined under FIFA eligibility rules; some limited exceptions apply. Players may hold more than one non-FIFA nationality.

No.	Pos.	Nation	Player
—	MF	MEX	Ulises Cardona (on loan from Atlas, previously on loan at UANL)
—	MF	CHI	Lorenzo Reyes (from Atlas)

Out: Note: Flags indicate national team as defined under FIFA eligibility rules; some limited exceptions apply. Players may hold more than one non-FIFA nationality.

No.	Pos.	Nation	Player
1	FW	MEX	César Huerta (loan return from Mazatlán)
26	MF	MEX	Aldo Rocha (to Atlas)

=== Monterrey ===
In: Note: Flags indicate national team as defined under FIFA eligibility rules; some limited exceptions apply. Players may hold more than one non-FIFA nationality.

No.	Pos.	Nation	Player

Out: Note: Flags indicate national team as defined under FIFA eligibility rules; some limited exceptions apply. Players may hold more than one non-FIFA nationality.

No.	Pos.	Nation	Player

=== Necaxa ===
In: Note: Flags indicate national team as defined under FIFA eligibility rules; some limited exceptions apply. Players may hold more than one non-FIFA nationality.

No.	Pos.	Nation	Player
24	FW	ESP	Ian (re-loan from Atlético San Luis)
32	GK	MEX	Édgar Hernández (from Atlas)

Out: Note: Flags indicate national team as defined under FIFA eligibility rules; some limited exceptions apply. Players may hold more than one non-FIFA nationality.

No.	Pos.	Nation	Player
9	FW	ARG	Lucas Passerini (loan return to Cruz Azul)
22	DF	MEX	Ricardo Chávez (to Atlético San Luis)

=== Pachuca ===
In: Note: Flags indicate national team as defined under FIFA eligibility rules; some limited exceptions apply. Players may hold more than one non-FIFA nationality.

No.	Pos.	Nation	Player
—	DF	ARG	Matías Catalán (from Atlético San Luis)
—	MF	COL	Santiago Mosquera (from (United States) Dallas)
—	FW	ARG	Mauro Quiroga (from Atlético San Luis)

Out: Note: Flags indicate national team as defined under FIFA eligibility rules; some limited exceptions apply. Players may hold more than one non-FIFA nationality.

No.	Pos.	Nation	Player
7	MF	CHI	Víctor Dávila (on loan to León)

=== Puebla ===
In: Note: Flags indicate national team as defined under FIFA eligibility rules; some limited exceptions apply. Players may hold more than one non-FIFA nationality.

No.	Pos.	Nation	Player

Out: Note: Flags indicate national team as defined under FIFA eligibility rules; some limited exceptions apply. Players may hold more than one non-FIFA nationality.

No.	Pos.	Nation	Player
5	DF	MEX	Daniel Arreola (loan return to Atlas)
7	MF	MEX	Pablo González (to Atlas)

=== Querétaro ===
In: Note: Flags indicate national team as defined under FIFA eligibility rules; some limited exceptions apply. Players may hold more than one non-FIFA nationality.

No.	Pos.	Nation	Player

Out: Note: Flags indicate national team as defined under FIFA eligibility rules; some limited exceptions apply. Players may hold more than one non-FIFA nationality.

No.	Pos.	Nation	Player

=== Santos Laguna ===
In: Note: Flags indicate national team as defined under FIFA eligibility rules; some limited exceptions apply. Players may hold more than one non-FIFA nationality.

No.	Pos.	Nation	Player
—	MF	MEX	Andrés Ávila (on loan from Atlas, previously on loan at Tampico Madero)
—	MF	MEX	Jesús Isijara (from Atlas)
—	FW	CHI	Ignacio Jeraldino (on loan from Atlas)
—	FW	COL	Juan Ferney Otero (from (France) Amiens)

Out: Note: Flags indicate national team as defined under FIFA eligibility rules; some limited exceptions apply. Players may hold more than one non-FIFA nationality.

No.	Pos.	Nation	Player
7	MF	MEX	Brayan Garnica (to Atlas)
9	FW	ARG	Julio Furch (to Atlas)
—	MF	MEX	Kevin Lara (to Celaya, previously on loan at Tampico Madero)

=== Tijuana ===
In: Note: Flags indicate national team as defined under FIFA eligibility rules; some limited exceptions apply. Players may hold more than one non-FIFA nationality.

No.	Pos.	Nation	Player

Out: Note: Flags indicate national team as defined under FIFA eligibility rules; some limited exceptions apply. Players may hold more than one non-FIFA nationality.

No.	Pos.	Nation	Player
20	MF	MEX	Mauro Lainez (on loan to América)
32	DF	MEX	Bryan Colula (loan return to América)

=== Toluca ===
In: Note: Flags indicate national team as defined under FIFA eligibility rules; some limited exceptions apply. Players may hold more than one non-FIFA nationality.

No.	Pos.	Nation	Player
—	MF	MEX	José Juan Vázquez (on loan from Guadalajara)

Out: Note: Flags indicate national team as defined under FIFA eligibility rules; some limited exceptions apply. Players may hold more than one non-FIFA nationality.

No.	Pos.	Nation	Player
7	MF	MEX	Alan Medina (to América)
16	MF	MEX	Javier Güémez (on loan to Atlético San Luis)
24	MF	MEX	Carlos Cisneros (loan return to Guadalajara)

=== UANL ===
In: Note: Flags indicate national team as defined under FIFA eligibility rules; some limited exceptions apply. Players may hold more than one non-FIFA nationality.

No.	Pos.	Nation	Player

Out: Note: Flags indicate national team as defined under FIFA eligibility rules; some limited exceptions apply. Players may hold more than one non-FIFA nationality.

No.	Pos.	Nation	Player
13	MF	MEX	Ulises Cardona (loan return to Atlas)

=== UNAM ===
In: Note: Flags indicate national team as defined under FIFA eligibility rules; some limited exceptions apply. Players may hold more than one non-FIFA nationality.

No.	Pos.	Nation	Player
—	MF	ARG	Mauro Fernández (loan return from Juárez)

Out: Note: Flags indicate national team as defined under FIFA eligibility rules; some limited exceptions apply. Players may hold more than one non-FIFA nationality.

No.	Pos.	Nation	Player
3	DF	MEX	Alejandro Mayorga (loan return to Guadalajara)
8	MF	MEX	Andrés Iniestra (on loan to Juárez)
