= 2019–20 Atlas F.C. season =

Atlas
2019–20 season
- Chairman: Pedro Portilla
- Manager: Leandro Cufré
- Stadium: Estadio Jalisco
- Apertura: 10th
- Highest home attendance: 40,700 (vs América, 30 August 2019)
- Lowest home attendance: 18,890 (vs Pachuca, 30 July 2019)
- Average home league attendance: 25,583
- Biggest win: Atlas 3–0 América (30 August 2019)
- Biggest defeat: Atlas 1–3 Cruz Azul (16 August 2019)
Home colours	Away colours
- All statistics correct as of 18 September 2019.

The 2019–20 Atlas F.C. season is the 90th season in the football club's history and the 50th consecutive season in the top flight of Mexican football.

== Coaching staff ==
Position	Name
Head coach	(Mexico) Leandro Cufré
Assistant coaches	(Mexico) Lucas Ayala
Assistant coaches	(Mexico) Sergio Amaury Ponce
Fitness coach	(Mexico) Alejandro López
Kinesiologist	(Mexico) Eder Fiol
Doctor	(Mexico) José Gutiérrez

== Transfers ==
=== In ===
N	Pos.	Nat.	Name	Age	Moving from	Type	Transfer window	Source
12	GK	(Colombia)	Camilo Vargas	9 March 1989 (aged 30)	(Colombia) Deportivo Cali	Transfer	Summer	
20	MF	(Ecuador)	Manu Balda	21 February 1992 (aged 27)	(Ecuador) El Nacional	Transfer	Summer	

=== Out ===
N	Pos.	Nat.	Name	Age	Moving to	Type	Transfer window	Source
7	MF	(Mexico)	Juan Pablo Vigón	20 July 1991 (aged 27)	UNAM	Transfer	Summer	
10	MF	(Ghana)	Clifford Aboagye	11 February 1995 (aged 24)	Querétaro	Loan	Summer	

== Competitions ==
=== Overview ===
Competition	First match	Last match	Starting round	Record							
Competition	First match	Last match	Starting round	Pld	W	D	L	GF	GA	GD	Win %
Torneo Apertura	19 July 2019		Matchday 1	9	4	1	4	11	11	+0	44.44
Copa MX	30 July 2019		Group stage	2	0	1	1	3	4	−1	0.00
Torneo Clausura			Matchday 1	0	0	0	0	0	0	+0	—
Total				11	4	2	5	14	15	−1	36.36

Last updated: 18 September 2019
Source: Mediotiempo.com

=== Torneo Apertura ===
==== League table ====
Pos	Team	Pld	W	D	L	GF	GA	GD	Pts
12	Cruz Azul	18	5	8	5	25	24	+1	23
13	UNAM	18	6	5	7	21	20	+1	23
14	Atlas	18	6	3	9	19	26	−7	21
15	Atlético San Luis	18	6	2	10	22	31	−9	20
16	Juárez	18	5	3	10	17	27	−10	18

Source: Liga MX
Rules for classification: 1) Points; 2) Goal difference; 3) Number of goals scored; 4) Head-to-head results between tied teams; 5) Number of goals scored away; 6) Highest relegation coefficient; 7) Fair Play points

==== Results summary ====
Overall								Home						Away					
Pld	W	D	L	GF	GA	GD	Pts	W	D	L	GF	GA	GD	W	D	L	GF	GA	GD
9	4	1	4	11	11	0	13	2	1	2	7	6	+1	2	0	2	4	5	−1

Last updated: 18 September 2019.
Source: LigaMX

==== Result round by round ====
Round	1	2	3	4	5	6	7	8	9	10	11	12	13	14	15	16	17
Ground	H	A	H	A	H	A	H	H	A	H	A	H	A	H	A	H	A
Result	W	W	L	W	L	L	D	W	L								
Position	8	3	6	5	7	10	8	6	10								

Updated to match(es) played on 18 September 2019. Source: Mediotiempo.com
A = Away; H = Home; W = Win; D = Draw; L = Loss

==== Matches ====
19 July 2019 1	Atlas	1–0	Juárez	Guadalajara
21:45	Édson 49'	Report		Stadium: Estadio Jalisco; Attendance: 28,893; Referee: José Alfredo Peñaloza

26 July 2019 2	Morelia	0–1	Atlas	Morelia
19:00		Report	Isijara 74'	Stadium: Estadio Morelos; Attendance: 20,136; Referee: Oscar Mejía

2 August 2019 3	Atlas	1–2	Santos Laguna	Guadalajara
21:00	Martínez 90+4'	Report	Lozano 15', 85'	Stadium: Estadio Jalisco; Attendance: 31,317; Referee: Adonai Escobedo

9 August 2019 4	Veracruz	1–2	Atlas	Boca del Río
21:05	Menéndez 10'	Report	Correa 53'; Martínez 76'	Stadium: Estadio Luis "Pirata" Fuente; Attendance: 14,614; Referee: César Arturo Ramos

16 August 2019 5	Atlas	1–3	Cruz Azul	Guadalajara
21:00	Segura 70'	Report	Pineda 25'; Caraglio 44', 47'	Stadium: Estadio Jalisco; Attendance: 39,733; Referee: Diego Montaño

24 August 2019 6	Pachuca	3–1	Atlas	Pachuca
19:00	Murillo 29'; Hernández 44'; Dávila 72'	Report	Cabral 69' (o.g.)	Stadium: Estadio Hidalgo; Attendance: 20,718; Referee: Oscar Mejía

27 August 2019 7	Atlas	1–1	UANL	Guadalajara
19:00	Barceló 55'	Report	Dueñas 90+3'	Stadium: Estadio Jalisco; Attendance: 20,732; Referee: Fernando Hernández

30 August 2019 8	Atlas	3–0	América	Guadalajara
21:10	Isijara 44'; Govea 64'; Trejo 90+6'	Report		Stadium: Estadio Jalisco; Attendance: 40,700; Referee: Roberto García Orozco

14 September 2019 9	Guadalajara	1–0	Atlas	Zapopan
19:00	Vega 63'	Report		Stadium: Estadio Akron; Attendance: 37,168; Referee: César Arturo Ramos

== Copa MX ==
=== Group stage ===
Pos	Team	Pld	W	D	L	GF	GA	GD	Pts	Qualification
1	Pachuca	2	1	1	0	4	2	+2	4	Advance to knockout stage
2	Atlas	3	1	1	1	5	4	+1	4	Possible knockout stage
3	Zacatepec	3	1	0	2	4	7	−3	3	

Updated to match(es) played on 1 October 2019. Source: Copa MX
Rules for classification: Tiebreakers

30 July 2019 1	Atlas	1–1	Pachuca	Guadalajara
21:00	Álvarez 30'	Report	Copete 83'	Stadium: Estadio Jalisco; Attendance: 18,890; Referee: Luis Enrique Santander

6 August 2019 2	Zacatepec	3–2	Atlas	Zacatepec
19:00	Basulto 46'; Ramírez 57', 61'	Report	Zaldívar 13'; Correa 77'	Stadium: Estadio Agustín "Coruco" Díaz; Attendance: 5,907; Referee: Ricardo Norman

== Statistics ==
=== Squad statistics ===
No.	Pos	Nat	Player	Total		Apertura		Copa MX		Clausura	
No.	Pos	Nat	Player	Apps	Goals	Apps	Goals	Apps	Goals	Apps	Goals
2	DF	(Argentina)	Hugo Nervo	8	0	8	0	0	0	0	0
3	DF	(Mexico)	Ismael Govea	4	1	4	1	0	0	0	0
4	DF	(Colombia)	Jorge Segura	7	1	7	1	0	0	0	0
5	DF	(Peru)	Anderson Santamaría	7	0	5	0	2	0	0	0
6	MF	(Mexico)	Edgar Zaldívar	7	1	6	0	1	1	0	0
7	MF	(Mexico)	Jairo Torres	9	0	8	0	1	0	0	0
8	MF	(Colombia)	Andrés Andrade	7	0	6	0	1	0	0	0
10	MF	(Paraguay)	Osvaldo Martínez	9	2	9	2	0	0	0	0
11	MF	(Argentina)	Ricky Álvarez	4	1	3	0	1	1	0	0
12	GK	(Colombia)	Camilo Vargas	9	0	9	0	0	0	0	0
13	MF	(Mexico)	Ulises Cardona	2	0	2	0	0	0	0	0
15	DF	(Mexico)	Diego Barbosa	5	0	5	0	0	0	0	0
16	MF	(Mexico)	Daniel Aguilar	4	0	3	0	1	0	0	0
17	MF	(Colombia)	Mauricio Cuero	5	0	4	0	1	0	0	0
20	MF	(Ecuador)	Manu Balda	1	0	0	0	1	0	0	0
21	MF	(Chile)	Lorenzo Reyes	9	0	8	0	1	0	0	0
23	GK	(Mexico)	Édgar Hernández	2	0	0	0	2	0	0	0
24	DF	(Mexico)	José Lozano	1	0	0	0	1	0	0	0
25	FW	(Mexico)	Édson Rivera	5	1	3	1	2	0	0	0
26	MF	(Mexico)	Jesús Isijara	9	2	9	2	0	0	0	0
27	DF	(Mexico)	Jesús Angulo	6	0	6	0	0	0	0	0
28	FW	(Mexico)	Eleuterio Jiménez	1	0	0	0	1	0	0	0
29	FW	(Argentina)	Javier Correa	9	2	8	1	1	1	0	0
31	FW	(Uruguay)	Facundo Barceló	7	1	5	1	2	0	0	0
186	FW	(Mexico)	Christopher Trejo	8	1	6	1	2	0	0	0
187	MF	(Mexico)	Israel Reyes	1	0	0	0	1	0	0	0
199	FW	(Mexico)	Jonathan Herrera	2	0	0	0	2	0	0	0
200	MF	(Mexico)	Aldo López	2	0	0	0	2	0	0	0
203	DF	(Mexico)	Jesús Gómez	3	0	1	0	2	0	0	0
207	DF	(Mexico)	Carlos Robles	1	0	1	0	0	0	0	0

Last updated: 18 September 2019
Source: Mediotiempo.com

=== Goals ===
As of 18 September 2019

Rank	Player	Position	Apertura	Copa MX	Clausura	Total
1	(Argentina) Javier Correa	FW	1	1	0	2
1	(Paraguay) Osvaldo Martínez	MF	2	0	0	2
1	(Mexico) Jesús Isijara	MF	2	0	0	2
4	(Argentina) Ricky Álvarez	MF	0	1	0	1
4	(Uruguay) Facundo Barceló	FW	1	0	0	1
4	(Mexico) Ismael Govea	DF	1	0	0	1
4	(Mexico) Édson Rivera	FW	1	0	0	1
4	(Colombia) Jorge Segura	DF	1	0	0	1
4	(Mexico) Christopher Trejo	FW	1	0	0	1
4	(Mexico) Edgar Zaldívar	MF	0	1	0	1

=== Clean sheets ===
As of 18 September 2019

Rank	Name	Apertura	Copa MX	Clausura	Total
1	(Colombia) Camilo Vargas	3	0	0	3

=== Disciplinary record ===
N	P	Nat.	Name	Apertura			Copa MX			Total			Notes
N	P	Nat.	Name	Yellow card	Second yellow card	Red card	Yellow card	Second yellow card	Red card	Yellow card	Second yellow card	Red card	Notes
2	DF	(Argentina)	Hugo Nervo	3		1				3		1	
4	DF	(Colombia)	Jorge Segura	3	1					3	1		
12	GK	(Colombia)	Camilo Vargas	3						3			
5	DF	(Peru)	Anderson Santamaría	3						3			
6	MF	(Mexico)	Edgar Zaldívar	2						2			
15	DF	(Mexico)	Diego Barbosa	2						2			
29	FW	(Argentina)	Javier Correa	2						2			
10	FW	(Paraguay)	Osvaldo Martínez	2						2			
31	FW	(Uruguay)	Facundo Barceló	1			1			2			
27	DF	(Mexico)	Jesús Angulo	2						2			
26	MF	(Mexico)	Jesús Isijara	1						1			
8	MF	(Colombia)	Andrés Andrade	1						1			
21	MF	(Chile)	Lorenzo Reyes	1						1			
3	DF	(Mexico)	Ismael Govea	1						1			
203	DF	(Mexico)	Jesús Gómez				1			1			

Last updated: 18 September 2019
Source: LigaMX
Only competitive matches
(yellow card) = Number of bookings; (second yellow card) = Number of sending offs after a second yellow card; (red card) = Number of sending offs by a direct red card.
