= 2018 Toulon Tournament squads =

Football tournament squads

The 2018 Toulon Tournament was an international association football tournament held in Bouches-du-Rhône, France. The twelve national teams involved in the tournament were required to register a squad of 20 players; only players in these squads were eligible to take part in the tournament.

Players in boldface have been capped at full international level at some point in their career.

== Group A ==
=== China PR ===
Head coach: (China) Sun Jihai

No.	Pos.	Player	Date of birth (age)	Club
1	GK	Fan Jinming	20 January 1997 (aged 21)	(Chinese Football Association) Zhejiang Greentown
2	DF	Yang Shuai	28 January 1997 (aged 21)	(Chinese Football Association) Liaoning Whowin
3	DF	Guo Jing	24 February 1997 (aged 21)	(Chinese Football Association) Guangzhou Evergrande Taobao
4	DF	**Wen Jiabao**	2 January 1999 (aged 19)	(Chinese Football Association) Guangzhou Evergrande Taobao
5	DF	Liu Boyang	18 January 1997 (aged 21)	(Chinese Football Association) Beijing Renhe
6	MF	Liu Yue	14 September 1997 (aged 20)	(Chinese Football Association) Tianjin Quanjian
7	MF	Cong Zhen	9 February 1997 (aged 21)	(Chinese Football Association) Shanghai Greenland Shenhua
8	MF	Zhang Lingfeng	28 February 1997 (aged 21)	(Chinese Football Association) Jiangsu Suning
9	MF	Gao Huaze	20 October 1997 (aged 20)	(Chinese Football Association) Hebei China Fortune
10	MF	Sun Weizhe	1 January 1997 (aged 21)	(Chinese Football Association) Beijing Renhe
11	FW	**Xie Weijun**	14 November 1997 (aged 20)	(Chinese Football Association) Tianjin TEDA
12	DF	Jiang Minwen	16 June 1997 (aged 20)	(Chinese Football Association) Wuhan Zall
13	MF	Yan Dinghao	6 April 1998 (aged 20)	(Portuguese Football Federation) Porto B
14	MF	Deng Yubiao	8 June 1997 (aged 20)	(Chinese Football Association) Guangzhou Evergrande Taobao
16	MF	Liu Yi	26 January 1997 (aged 21)	(Chinese Football Association) Tianjin Quanjian
17	MF	Feng Boxuan	18 March 1997 (aged 21)	(Chinese Football Association) Guangzhou Evergrande Taobao
18	DF	**Tong Lei**	16 December 1997 (aged 20)	(Chinese Football Association) Zhejiang Greentown
19	FW	Wang Jinze	15 March 1999 (aged 19)	(Chinese Football Association) Guangzhou Evergrande Taobao
20	MF	Wu Wei	5 February 1997 (aged 21)	(Chinese Football Association) Tianjin Quanjian
21	GK	Zhang Yan	30 March 1997 (aged 21)	(Chinese Football Association) Beijing Sinobo Guoan

=== England ===
Head coach: (England) Aidy Boothroyd

No.	Pos.	Player	Date of birth (age)	Club
1	GK	Freddie Woodman	4 March 1997 (aged 21)	(The Football Association) Newcastle United
2	DF	Jonjoe Kenny	15 March 1997 (aged 21)	(The Football Association) Everton
3	DF	**Kyle Walker-Peters**	13 April 1997 (aged 21)	(The Football Association) Tottenham Hotspur
4	MF	**Lewis Cook**	3 February 1997 (aged 21)	(The Football Association) Bournemouth
5	DF	Dael Fry	30 August 1997 (aged 20)	(The Football Association) Middlesbrough
6	DF	**Fikayo Tomori**	19 December 1997 (aged 20)	(The Football Association) Chelsea
7	MF	Kieran Dowell	10 October 1997 (aged 20)	(The Football Association) Everton
8	MF	Tom Davies	30 June 1998 (aged 19)	(The Football Association) Everton
9	FW	**Tammy Abraham**	2 October 1997 (aged 20)	(The Football Association) Chelsea
10	MF	**Ronaldo Vieira**	19 July 1998 (aged 19)	(The Football Association) Leeds United
11	FW	Adam Armstrong	10 February 1997 (aged 21)	(The Football Association) Newcastle United
12	DF	Jake Clarke-Salter	22 September 1997 (aged 20)	(The Football Association) Chelsea
13	GK	**Aaron Ramsdale**	14 May 1998 (aged 20)	(The Football Association) Bournemouth
14	DF	**Jay Dasilva**	22 April 1998 (aged 20)	(The Football Association) Chelsea
15	DF	**Ezri Konsa**	23 October 1997 (aged 20)	(The Football Association) Charlton Athletic
16	MF	**Hamza Choudhury**	1 October 1997 (aged 20)	(The Football Association) Leicester City
17	DF	Callum Connolly	23 September 1997 (aged 20)	(The Football Association) Everton
18	DF	Tom Pearce	12 April 1998 (aged 20)	(The Football Association) Leeds United
19	FW	**Eddie Nketiah**	30 May 1999 (aged 18)	(The Football Association) Arsenal
20	FW	**Lukas Nmecha**	14 December 1998 (aged 19)	(The Football Association) Manchester City

=== Mexico ===
Head coach: (Mexico) Marco Antonio Ruiz

No.	Pos.	Player	Date of birth (age)	Club
1	GK	José Hernández	1 May 1997 (aged 21)	(Mexican Football Federation) Atlas
2	DF	**Ismael Govea**	20 February 1997 (aged 21)	(Mexican Football Federation) Atlas
3	DF	**César Montes**	24 February 1997 (aged 21)	(Mexican Football Federation) Monterrey
4	DF	Carlos Vargas	14 February 1999 (aged 19)	(Mexican Football Federation) América
5	DF	**Gerardo Arteaga**	7 September 1998 (aged 19)	(Mexican Football Federation) Santos Laguna
6	MF	**Alan Cervantes**	17 January 1998 (aged 20)	(Mexican Football Federation) Guadalajara
7	MF	**Uriel Antuna**	21 August 1997 (aged 20)	(Royal Dutch Football Association) Groningen
8	MF	**Jonathan González**	13 April 1999 (aged 19)	(Mexican Football Federation) Monterrey
9	FW	**Jesús Godínez**	20 January 1997 (aged 21)	(Mexican Football Federation) Guadalajara
10	MF	**Roberto Alvarado**	7 September 1998 (aged 19)	(Mexican Football Federation) Cruz Azul
11	MF	Ulises Cardona	13 November 1998 (aged 19)	(Mexican Football Federation) Atlas
12	GK	Abraham Romero	18 February 1998 (aged 20)	(Mexican Football Federation) Pachuca
13	DF	**Jorge Sánchez**	10 December 1997 (aged 20)	(Mexican Football Federation) Santos Laguna
14	DF	Edson García	1 March 1998 (aged 20)	(Mexican Football Federation) Atlas
15	DF	**Joaquín Esquivel**	7 January 1998 (aged 20)	(Mexican Football Federation) Pachuca
16	MF	**Sebastián Córdova**	12 June 1997 (aged 20)	(Mexican Football Federation) América
17	MF	Héctor Mascorro	12 May 1997 (aged 21)	(Mexican Football Federation) Zacatecas
18	FW	**José Macías**	22 September 1999 (aged 18)	(Mexican Football Federation) Guadalajara
19	FW	**Eduardo Aguirre**	3 August 1998 (aged 19)	(Mexican Football Federation) Tampico Madero
20	MF	**Diego Lainez**	9 June 2000 (aged 17)	(Mexican Football Federation) América

=== Qatar ===
Head coach: (Portugal) Bruno Pinheiro

No.	Pos.	Player	Date of birth (age)	Club
1	GK	Marwan Badreldin	17 April 1999 (aged 19)	(Qatar Football Association) Al Ahli
2	DF	Nasir Peer	27 January 1999 (aged 19)	(Qatar Football Association) Qatar
3	DF	Ahmed Al-Minhali	5 May 1999 (aged 19)	(Qatar Football Association) Al Gharafa
4	MF	Abdullah Ali Saei	17 March 1999 (aged 19)	(Royal Belgian Football Association) Eupen
5	DF	**Yousef Aymen**	21 March 1999 (aged 19)	(Royal Belgian Football Association) Eupen
6	MF	Nasser Al Yazidi	2 February 2000 (aged 18)	(Qatar Football Association) Al-Duhail
7	FW	Hassan Ahmad	2 April 1998 (aged 20)	(Qatar Football Association) Al Sadd
8	MF	Nasser Al Ahrak	5 January 1999 (aged 19)	(Royal Spanish Football Federation) Cultural Leonesa
9	FW	**Yusuf Abdurisag**	6 August 1999 (aged 18)	(Qatar Football Association) Al Sadd
10	MF	**Khaled Mohammed**	7 June 2000 (aged 17)	(The Football Association) Leeds United
11	FW	Abdullah Murisi	24 August 1999 (aged 18)	(Qatar Football Association) Al Khor
12	DF	**Homam Ahmed**	25 August 1999 (aged 18)	(Royal Belgian Football Association) Eupen
15	MF	**Bahaa Ellethy**	18 April 1999 (aged 19)	(Qatar Football Association) Al Sadd
16	FW	**Hashim Ali**	17 August 2000 (aged 17)	(The Football Association) Leeds United
17	MF	Adel Bader	17 January 1997 (aged 21)	(Qatar Football Association) Al-Duhail
19	MF	**Ahmed Al-Hamawende**	8 February 1999 (aged 19)	(Qatar Football Association) Al Sadd
20	FW	Ahmed Jenahi	22 September 2000 (aged 17)	(Qatar Football Association) Al Sailiya
21	DF	Ali Malolah	26 February 1999 (aged 19)	(Royal Spanish Football Federation) Cultural Leonesa
22	GK	**Shehab Ellethy**	18 April 2000 (aged 18)	(Royal Spanish Football Federation) Cultural Leonesa
25	MF	Khaldoun Moussa	8 June 1999 (aged 18)	(Qatar Football Association) Al Arabi

== Group B ==
=== France ===
Head coach: (France) Johan Radet

No.	Pos.	Player	Date of birth (age)	Club
1	GK	**Dimitry Bertaud**	6 June 1998 (aged 19)	(French Football Federation) Montpellier
2	FW	Jérémie Porsan-Clémenté	16 December 1997 (aged 20)	(French Football Federation) Montpellier
3	DF	Romain Perraud	22 September 1997 (aged 20)	(French Football Federation) Nice
4	DF	**Harold Moukoudi**	27 November 1997 (aged 20)	(French Football Federation) Le Havre
5	DF	**Axel Disasi**	11 March 1998 (aged 20)	(French Football Federation) Stade de Reims
6	MF	Ludovic Blas	31 December 1997 (aged 20)	(French Football Federation) Guingamp
7	FW	Axel Bakayoko	6 January 1998 (aged 20)	(French Football Federation) Sochaux
8	MF	Jessy Deminguet	7 January 1998 (aged 20)	(French Football Federation) Caen
9	FW	**Jordan Tell**	10 June 1997 (aged 20)	(French Football Federation) Valenciennes
10	MF	**Jean-Ricner Bellegarde**	27 June 1998 (aged 19)	(French Football Federation) Lens
11	FW	**Steve Ambri**	12 August 1997 (aged 20)	(French Football Federation) Valenciennes
12	DF	Clément Michelin	11 May 1997 (aged 21)	(French Football Federation) Toulouse
13	DF	Thibault Campanini	27 July 1998 (aged 19)	(French Football Federation) Gazélec Ajaccio
14	MF	Teddy Bouriaud	3 January 1997 (aged 21)	(French Football Federation) Nantes
15	DF	**Gerzino Nyamsi**	22 January 1997 (aged 21)	(French Football Federation) Châteauroux
16	GK	Didier Desprez	13 March 1999 (aged 19)	(French Football Federation) Lens
17	MF	**Jeando Fuchs**	11 October 1997 (aged 20)	(French Football Federation) Sochaux
18	FW	Bryan Lasme	14 November 1998 (aged 19)	(French Football Federation) Sochaux
19	FW	**Wilfried Kanga**	21 February 1998 (aged 20)	(French Football Federation) Angers
20	FW	Maxime Pélican	12 May 1998 (aged 20)	(French Football Federation) Toulouse

=== Scotland ===
Head coach: (Scotland) Scot Gemmill

No.	Pos.	Player	Date of birth (age)	Club
1	GK	**Ross Doohan**	29 March 1998 (aged 20)	(Scottish Football Association) Celtic
2	DF	**Anthony Ralston**	16 November 1998 (aged 19)	(Scottish Football Association) Celtic
3	DF	**Greg Taylor**	5 November 1997 (aged 20)	(Scottish Football Association) Kilmarnock
4	DF	Jason Kerr	6 February 1997 (aged 21)	(Scottish Football Association) St Johnstone
5	DF	**Ryan Porteous**	25 March 1999 (aged 19)	(Scottish Football Association) Hibernian
6	DF	Daniel Harvie	14 July 1998 (aged 19)	(Scottish Football Association) Aberdeen
7	FW	**Oliver Burke**	7 April 1997 (aged 21)	(The Football Association) West Bromwich Albion
8	MF	**Mikey Johnston**	19 April 1999 (aged 19)	(Scottish Football Association) Celtic
9	FW	Fraser Hornby	13 September 1999 (aged 18)	(The Football Association) Everton
10	MF	Liam Burt	1 February 1999 (aged 19)	(Scottish Football Association) Rangers
11	FW	Scott Wright	8 August 1997 (aged 20)	(Scottish Football Association) Aberdeen
12	GK	Robby McCrorie	18 March 1998 (aged 20)	(Scottish Football Association) Rangers
13	MF	Iain Wilson	15 December 1998 (aged 19)	(Scottish Football Association) Kilmarnock
14	MF	Elliot Watt	11 March 2000 (aged 18)	(The Football Association) Wolverhampton Wanderers
15	MF	Glenn Middleton	1 January 2000 (aged 18)	(Scottish Football Association) Rangers
16	MF	**Billy Gilmour**	11 June 2001 (aged 16)	(The Football Association) Chelsea
17	MF	Harvey St Clair	13 November 1998 (aged 19)	(The Football Association) Chelsea
18	FW	Craig Wighton	27 July 1997 (aged 20)	(Scottish Football Association) Dundee
19	DF	Chris Hamilton	13 July 2001 (aged 16)	(Scottish Football Association) Heart of Midlothian
20	MF	**Allan Campbell**	4 July 1998 (aged 19)	(Scottish Football Association) Motherwell

=== South Korea ===
Head coach: (South Korea) Chung Jung-yong

No.	Pos.	Player	Date of birth (age)	Club
1	GK	Min Seong-jun	22 July 1999 (aged 18)	(Korea Football Association) Korea University
2	DF	Hwang Tae-hyeon	29 January 1999 (aged 19)	(Korea Football Association) Ansan Greeners
3	DF	**Lee Jae-ik**	21 May 1999 (aged 19)	(Korea Football Association) Gangwon
4	DF	Lee Ji-sol	9 July 1999 (aged 18)	(Korea Football Association) Daejeon Citizen
5	DF	Ko Jun-hee	28 February 2000 (aged 18)	(Korea Football Association) Boin High School
6	MF	Jeong Ho-jin	6 August 1999 (aged 18)	(Korea Football Association) Korea University
7	FW	Kim Chan	25 April 2000 (aged 18)	(Korea Football Association) Pohang Steelers
8	MF	Go Jae-hyun	5 March 1999 (aged 19)	(Korea Football Association) Daegu
9	FW	**Oh Se-hun**	15 January 1999 (aged 19)	(Korea Football Association) Ulsan Hyundai
10	MF	**Cho Young-wook**	5 February 1999 (aged 19)	(Korea Football Association) FC Seoul
11	MF	**Um Won-sang**	6 January 1999 (aged 19)	(Korea Football Association) Ajou University
12	DF	**Choi Jun**	17 April 1999 (aged 19)	(Korea Football Association) Yonsei University
13	DF	Lee Kyu-hyuk	4 May 1999 (aged 19)	(Korea Football Association) Dongguk University
14	MF	**Jeon Se-jin**	9 September 1999 (aged 18)	(Korea Football Association) Suwon Samsung Bluewings
15	DF	Jo Jin-woo	17 November 1999 (aged 18)	(Japan Football Association) Matsumoto Yamaga
16	MF	Lee Dong-geon	7 February 1999 (aged 19)	(Korea Football Association) Daegu
17	DF	Lee Sang-jun	14 October 1999 (aged 18)	(Korea Football Association) Busan IPark
18	GK	Park Ji-min	25 May 2000 (aged 18)	(Korea Football Association) Suwon Samsung Bluewings
19	MF	Kim Gyu-hyeong	29 March 1999 (aged 19)	(Croatian Football Federation) Dinamo Zagreb
20	MF	**Lee Kang-in**	19 February 2001 (aged 17)	(Royal Spanish Football Federation) Valencia Mestalla

=== Togo ===
Head coach: (France) Claude Le Roy

No.	Pos.	Player	Date of birth (age)	Club
1	GK	**Malcolm Barcola**	14 May 1999 (aged 19)	(French Football Federation) Lyon
2	FW	Komi Agbadji	15 November 1997 (aged 20)	(Togolese Football Federation) SNPT
3	FW	**Ashraf Agoro**	31 December 1997 (aged 20)	(Gabonese Football Federation) US Bitam
4	MF	Marco Boko	16 December 1998 (aged 19)	(Togolese Football Federation) Agaza
5	DF	**Hakim Ouro-Sama**	28 December 1997 (aged 20)	(Togolese Football Federation) AS Togo-Port
6	DF	**Messan Toudji**	15 May 1997 (aged 21)	(Togolese Football Federation) Anges
7	DF	**Guillaume Yenoussi**	2 June 1997 (aged 20)	(Togolese Football Federation) Dynamic Togolais
8	MF	Amévi Gadjabo	12 December 1998 (aged 19)	(Togolese Football Federation) Espoir
9	MF	**Elom Nya-Vedji**	24 November 1997 (aged 20)	(Togolese Football Federation) Académie Planète Foot
10	MF	**Bilal Akoro**	14 December 1999 (aged 18)	(Togolese Football Federation) AS OTR
11	FW	**Kévin Denkey**	30 November 2000 (aged 17)	(French Football Federation) Nîmes
12	DF	Komi Afanssounoudji	9 December 2000 (aged 17)	(Togolese Football Federation) Semassi
13	DF	Yendountié Balgou	24 December 1999 (aged 18)	(Togolese Football Federation) Arabia
14	MF	Fadel Gobitaka	16 January 1998 (aged 20)	(Royal Belgian Football Association) Standard Liège
15	DF	Kodjovi Djoyagbo	21 December 1998 (aged 19)	(Burkinabé Football Federation) Santos
16	GK	**Yorgan Agblemagnon**	9 July 1999 (aged 18)	(Portuguese Football Federation) Nacional
17	MF	Victor Mensah	20 June 1997 (aged 20)	(Togolese Football Federation) Dynamic Togolais
18	MF	Thomas Wogodo	28 January 2000 (aged 18)	(Togolese Football Federation) FSA
21	MF	**Kparo Jarry Ahoro**	15 August 1999 (aged 18)	(Togolese Football Federation) Swallows
22	FW	**Thibault Klidjé**	10 July 2001 (aged 16)	(Togolese Football Federation) Espoir

== Group C ==
=== Canada ===
Co-coaches: (England) John Herdman and (Canada) Mauro Biello

No.	Pos.	Player	Date of birth (age)	Club
1	GK	James Pantemis	21 February 1997 (aged 21)	(Canadian Soccer Association) Montreal Impact
2	DF	**Michael Baldisimo**	13 April 2000 (aged 18)	(Canadian Soccer Association) Vancouver Whitecaps FC
3	DF	Daniel Kinumbe	15 March 1999 (aged 19)	(Canadian Soccer Association) Montreal Impact Academy
4	DF	Kosovar Sadiki	27 August 1998 (aged 19)	(Croatian Football Federation) Lokomotiva
5	DF	**Derek Cornelius**	25 November 1997 (aged 20)	(Football Association of Serbia) Javor Ivanjica
6	MF	Matthew Roberts	2 April 2000 (aged 18)	(Football Association of Wales) Swansea City
7	MF	**Kris Twardek**	8 March 1997 (aged 21)	(The Football Association) Millwall
8	MF	**Mathieu Choinière**	7 February 1999 (aged 19)	(Canadian Soccer Association) Montreal Impact Academy
9	FW	**Jonathan David**	14 January 2000 (aged 18)	(Royal Belgian Football Association) Gent II
10	MF	Aidan Daniels	6 September 1998 (aged 19)	(Canadian Soccer Association) Toronto FC
11	FW	**Liam Millar**	27 September 1999 (aged 18)	(The Football Association) Liverpool
12	MF	**Shamit Shome**	5 September 1997 (aged 20)	(Canadian Soccer Association) Montreal Impact
13	DF	Clément Bayiha	8 March 1999 (aged 19)	(Canadian Soccer Association) Montreal Impact Academy
14	MF	David Norman Jr.	31 May 1998 (aged 19)	(Canadian Soccer Association) Vancouver Whitecaps FC
15	MF	Noah Verhoeven	15 June 1999 (aged 18)	(United States Soccer Federation) Fresno FC
16	MF	**Noble Okello**	20 July 2000 (aged 17)	(Canadian Soccer Association) Toronto FC II
17	FW	**Theo Bair**	27 August 1999 (aged 18)	(Canadian Soccer Association) Vancouver Whitecaps FC
18	GK	**Alessandro Busti**	30 June 2000 (aged 17)	(Italian Football Federation) Juventus Primavera
19	DF	Émile Legault	10 April 2000 (aged 18)	(French Football Federation) Auxerre U19 Nationaux
20	DF	Julian Dunn	11 July 2000 (aged 17)	(Canadian Soccer Association) Toronto FC

=== Japan ===
Head coach: (Japan) Akinobu Yokouchi

No.	Pos.	Player	Date of birth (age)	Club
1	GK	Powell Obinna Obi	18 December 1997 (aged 20)	(Japan Football Association) Ryutsu Keizai University
2	MF	So Fujitani	28 October 1997 (aged 20)	(Japan Football Association) Vissel Kobe
3	DF	**Yuta Nakayama**	16 February 1997 (aged 21)	(Japan Football Association) Kashiwa Reysol
4	DF	**Kō Itakura**	27 January 1997 (aged 21)	(Japan Football Association) Vegalta Sendai
5	DF	**Takehiro Tomiyasu**	5 November 1998 (aged 19)	(Royal Belgian Football Association) Sint-Truiden
6	MF	Ryō Hatsuse	10 July 1997 (aged 20)	(Japan Football Association) Gamba Osaka
7	MF	Shion Inoue	3 August 1997 (aged 20)	(Japan Football Association) Tokyo Verdy
8	MF	**Kaoru Mitoma**	20 May 1997 (aged 21)	(Japan Football Association) University of Tsukuba
9	FW	**Koki Ogawa**	8 August 1997 (aged 20)	(Japan Football Association) Júbilo Iwata
10	MF	**Koji Miyoshi**	26 March 1997 (aged 21)	(Japan Football Association) Hokkaido Consadole Sapporo
11	FW	**Kyosuke Tagawa**	11 February 1999 (aged 19)	(Japan Football Association) Sagan Tosu
12	GK	Louis Yamaguchi	28 May 1998 (aged 19)	(Royal Spanish Football Federation) Extremadura UD B
13	FW	**Ayase Ueda**	28 August 1998 (aged 19)	(Japan Football Association) Hosei University
14	MF	Taishi Matsumoto	22 August 1998 (aged 19)	(Japan Football Association) Sanfrecce Hiroshima
15	DF	**Daiki Sugioka**	8 September 1998 (aged 19)	(Japan Football Association) Shonan Bellmare
16	MF	**Tsukasa Morishima**	25 April 1997 (aged 21)	(Japan Football Association) Sanfrecce Hiroshima
17	MF	**Keita Endō**	22 November 1997 (aged 20)	(Japan Football Association) Yokohama F. Marinos
18	MF	**Daiki Suga**	10 September 1998 (aged 19)	(Japan Football Association) Hokkaido Consadole Sapporo
19	DF	**Daiki Hashioka**	17 May 1999 (aged 19)	(Japan Football Association) Urawa Red Diamonds
20	DF	Keiya Shiihashi	20 June 1997 (aged 20)	(Japan Football Association) Vegalta Sendai

=== Portugal ===
Head coach: (Portugal) Hélio Sousa

No.	Pos.	Player	Date of birth (age)	Club
1	GK	João Virgínia	10 October 1999 (aged 18)	(The Football Association) Arsenal
2	DF	Francisco Moura	16 August 1999 (aged 18)	(Portuguese Football Federation) Braga
3	DF	Romain Correia	6 September 1999 (aged 18)	(Portuguese Football Federation) Vitória de Guimarães
4	DF	Luís Silva	18 February 1999 (aged 19)	(The Football Association) Stoke City
5	DF	Rúben Vinagre	9 April 1999 (aged 19)	(The Football Association) Wolverhampton Wanderers
6	MF	Florentino	19 August 1999 (aged 18)	(Portuguese Football Federation) Benfica
7	FW	Jota	30 March 1999 (aged 19)	(Portuguese Football Federation) Benfica
8	MF	Diogo Teixeira	20 January 1999 (aged 19)	(Portuguese Football Federation) Rio Ave
9	FW	José Gomes	8 April 1999 (aged 19)	(Portuguese Football Federation) Benfica
10	MF	Domingos Quina	18 November 1999 (aged 18)	(The Football Association) West Ham United
11	FW	Mesaque Djú	18 March 1999 (aged 19)	(Portuguese Football Federation) Benfica
12	GK	Luís Maximiano	5 January 1999 (aged 19)	(Portuguese Football Federation) Sporting CP
13	MF	**David Tavares**	18 March 1999 (aged 19)	(Portuguese Football Federation) Benfica
14	DF	**David Carmo**	19 July 1999 (aged 18)	(Portuguese Football Federation) Braga
15	DF	Costinha	26 March 2000 (aged 18)	(Portuguese Football Federation) Rio Ave
16	MF	Afonso Brito	5 May 1999 (aged 19)	(Portuguese Football Federation) Braga
17	FW	**Trincão**	29 December 1999 (aged 18)	(Portuguese Football Federation) Braga
18	MF	Duarte Valente	2 November 1999 (aged 18)	(Portuguese Football Federation) Estoril
19	FW	Pedro Martelo	12 October 1999 (aged 18)	(Royal Spanish Football Federation) Deportivo La Coruña
20	FW	**Elves Baldé**	2 October 1999 (aged 18)	(Portuguese Football Federation) Sporting CP

=== Turkey ===
Head coach: (Turkey) Muzaffer Bilazer

No.	Pos.	Player	Date of birth (age)	Club
1	GK	**Muhammed Şengezer**	5 January 1997 (aged 21)	(Turkish Football Federation) Bursaspor
2	DF	Savaş Polat	14 April 1997 (aged 21)	(Turkish Football Federation) Konya Anadolu Selçukspor
3	DF	Abdurrahim Dursun	1 December 1998 (aged 19)	(Turkish Football Federation) Trabzonspor
4	DF	Gökhan Kardeş	15 May 1997 (aged 21)	(Romanian Football Federation) Juventus București
5	DF	**Merih Demiral**	5 March 1998 (aged 20)	(Portuguese Football Federation) Sporting CP B
6	MF	Atakan Çankaya	25 June 1998 (aged 19)	(Turkish Football Federation) Altay
7	MF	Barış Alıcı	24 June 1997 (aged 20)	(Turkish Football Federation) Altınordu
8	MF	Eslem Öztürk	1 December 1997 (aged 20)	(Turkish Football Federation) İstanbulspor
9	FW	Kubilay Kanatsızkuş	28 March 1997 (aged 21)	(Turkish Football Federation) Bursaspor
10	MF	Alican Özfesli	1 January 1997 (aged 21)	(Turkish Football Federation) Altınordu
11	MF	Muhammed Enes Durmuş	8 January 1997 (aged 21)	(Turkish Football Federation) Göztepe
12	GK	**Altay Bayındır**	14 April 1998 (aged 20)	(Turkish Football Federation) Ankaragücü
13	DF	Duhan Aksu	11 September 1997 (aged 20)	(Turkish Football Federation) İstanbulspor
14	DF	Fatih Aksoy	6 November 1997 (aged 20)	(Turkish Football Federation) Beşiktaş
15	DF	Adil Demirbağ	10 December 1997 (aged 20)	(Turkish Football Federation) Adana Demirspor
16	MF	Ahmet Canbaz	27 April 1998 (aged 20)	(German Football Association) Eintracht Braunschweig
17	MF	Furgan Polat	21 January 1997 (aged 21)	(Turkish Football Federation) Eskişehirspor
18	FW	Mücahit Can Akçay	13 April 1998 (aged 20)	(Turkish Football Federation) Konya Anadolu Selçukspor
19	MF	**Mustafa Eskihellaç**	5 May 1997 (aged 21)	(Turkish Football Federation) Yeni Malatyaspor
20	MF	Harun Alpsoy	3 March 1997 (aged 21)	(Turkish Football Federation) Antalyaspor
