= Agblemagnon =

Agblemagnon is a surname. Notable people with the surname include:

- Gloria Agblemagnon (born 1997), French Paralympic athlete
- Yorgan Agblemagnon (born 1999), French footballer
