= Ulises Cardona =

Mexican footballer (born 1998)

Personal information
- Full name: Ulises Israel Cardona Carrillo
- Date of birth: 13 November 1998 (age 27)
- Place of birth: Guadalajara, Jalisco, Mexico
- Height: 1.77 m (5 ft 10 in)
- Position: Winger

Youth career
- 2014–2015: Atotonilco F.C.
- 2015–2017: Guadalajara
- 2017: Atlas

Senior career*
Years	Team	Apps	(Gls)
2017–2021	Atlas	39	(2)
2020	→ UANL (loan)	0	(0)
2021	→ Mazatlán (loan)	5	(0)
2022	Necaxa	2	(0)
2023–2024	Atlético Morelia	37	(0)
2024–2026	Tepatitlán	22	(2)

International career
2018	Mexico U21	3	(0)
2019	Mexico U23	8	(0)
Medal record
Men's football
Representing Mexico
Toulon Tournament
Third place	2019 France	Team
Runner-up	2018 France	Team
Pan American Games
Bronze medal – third place	2019 Lima	Team competition
- * Club domestic league appearances and goals as of 29 March 2025

Ulises Israel Cardona Carrillo (born 13 November 1998) is a Mexican professional footballer who plays as a winger.

== International career ==
Cardona was included in the under-21 roster that participated in the 2018 Toulon Tournament, where Mexico would finish runners-up.

Cardona was called up by Jaime Lozano to participate with the under-22 team at the 2019 Toulon Tournament, where Mexico won third place. He was called up by Lozano again to participate at the 2019 Pan American Games, with Mexico winning the third-place match.

== Career statistics ==
=== Club ===
As of 17 July 2022

Club	Season	League			Cup		Continental		Other		Total	
Club	Season	Division	Apps	Goals	Apps	Goals	Apps	Goals	Apps	Goals	Apps	Goals
Atlas	2017–18	Liga MX	11	1	6	0	–		–		17	1
Atlas	2018–19	Liga MX	18	1	6	0	–		–		24	1
Atlas	2019–20	Liga MX	10	0	3	0	–		–		13	0
Atlas	Total		39	2	15	0	–		–		54	2
Mazatlán (loan)	2020–21	Liga MX	3	0	–		–		–		3	0
Mazatlán (loan)	2021–22	Liga MX	2	0	–		–		–		2	0
Mazatlán (loan)	Total		5	0	–		–		–		5	0
Necaxa	2022–23	Liga MX	2	0	–		–		–		2	0
Career total			46	2	15	0	0	0	0	0	61	2

== Honours ==
Mexico U23

- Pan American Bronze Medal: 2019
