= Afonso Brito =

Portuguese footballer

Personal information
- Full name: Afonso Maria Pereira Martins Gouveia Brito
- Date of birth: 5 May 1999 (age 27)
- Place of birth: Santa Maria da Feira, Portugal
- Height: 1.88 m (6 ft 2 in)
- Position: Midfielder

Youth career
- 2007–2011: Feirense
- 2011–2013: Sporting
- 2013–2014: Feirense
- 2014–2015: Sanjoanense
- 2015–2016: Boavista
- 2016–2018: Braga

Senior career*
Years	Team	Apps	(Gls)
2018–2019	Jumilla	7	(0)
2019–2020	Feirense	5	(0)
- * Club domestic league appearances and goals as of 20:49, 19 February 2020 (UTC)

Afonso Maria Pereira Martins Gouveia Brito (born 5 May 1999) is a Portuguese professional footballer who plays as a midfielder.

== Club career ==
He made his Primeira Liga debut for Feirense on 20 April 2019 in a game against Braga.
