= Jiang Minwen =

Chinese footballer

Personal information
- Date of birth: 16 June 1997 (age 29)
- Place of birth: Shangrao, Jiangxi, China
- Height: 1.77 m (5 ft 9 1/2 in)
- Position: Midfielder

Team information
- Current team: Wuhan Zall
- Number: 28

Senior career*
Years	Team	Apps	(Gls)
2017–	Wuhan Zall	10	(1)

International career^{‡}
2018	China U21	2	(0)
- * Club domestic league appearances and goals as of 31 December 2020 (UTC) ‡ National team caps and goals as of 31 December 2019 (UTC)

Jiang Minwen (Chinese: 江敏文; pinyin: Jiāng Mǐnwén; born 16 June 1997) is a Chinese footballer currently playing as a midfielder for Wuhan Zall of the Chinese Super League.

== Club career ==
Jiang Minwen would be promoted to the senior team of Wuhan Zall in the 2017 China League One campaign and would go on to make his debut on 20 April 2017 in a Chinese FA Cup game against Shanghai Jiading Boo King that ended in a 2-1 defeat. He would go on to be a squad player that gained promotion to the top tier for the club by winning the 2018 China League One division with them.

== Career statistics ==
As of 31 December 2020.

Club	Season	League			Cup		Continental		Other		Total	
Club	Season	Division	Apps	Goals	Apps	Goals	Apps	Goals	Apps	Goals	Apps	Goals
Wuhan Zall	2017	China League One	0	0	1	0	–		–		1	0
Wuhan Zall	2018	China League One	3	0	2	0	–		–		5	0
Wuhan Zall	2019	Chinese Super League	6	1	1	0	–		–		7	1
Wuhan Zall	2020	Chinese Super League	1	0	0	0	–		0 (Note: Appearance(s) in CSL Relegation play-offs)	0	1	0
Wuhan Zall	Total		10	1	4	0	0	0	0	0	14	1
Career total			10	1	4	0	0	0	0	0	14	1

== Honours ==
=== Club ===
Wuhan Zall

- China League One: 2018
