= Mauro Fernández (footballer, born 1989) =

Argentine footballer

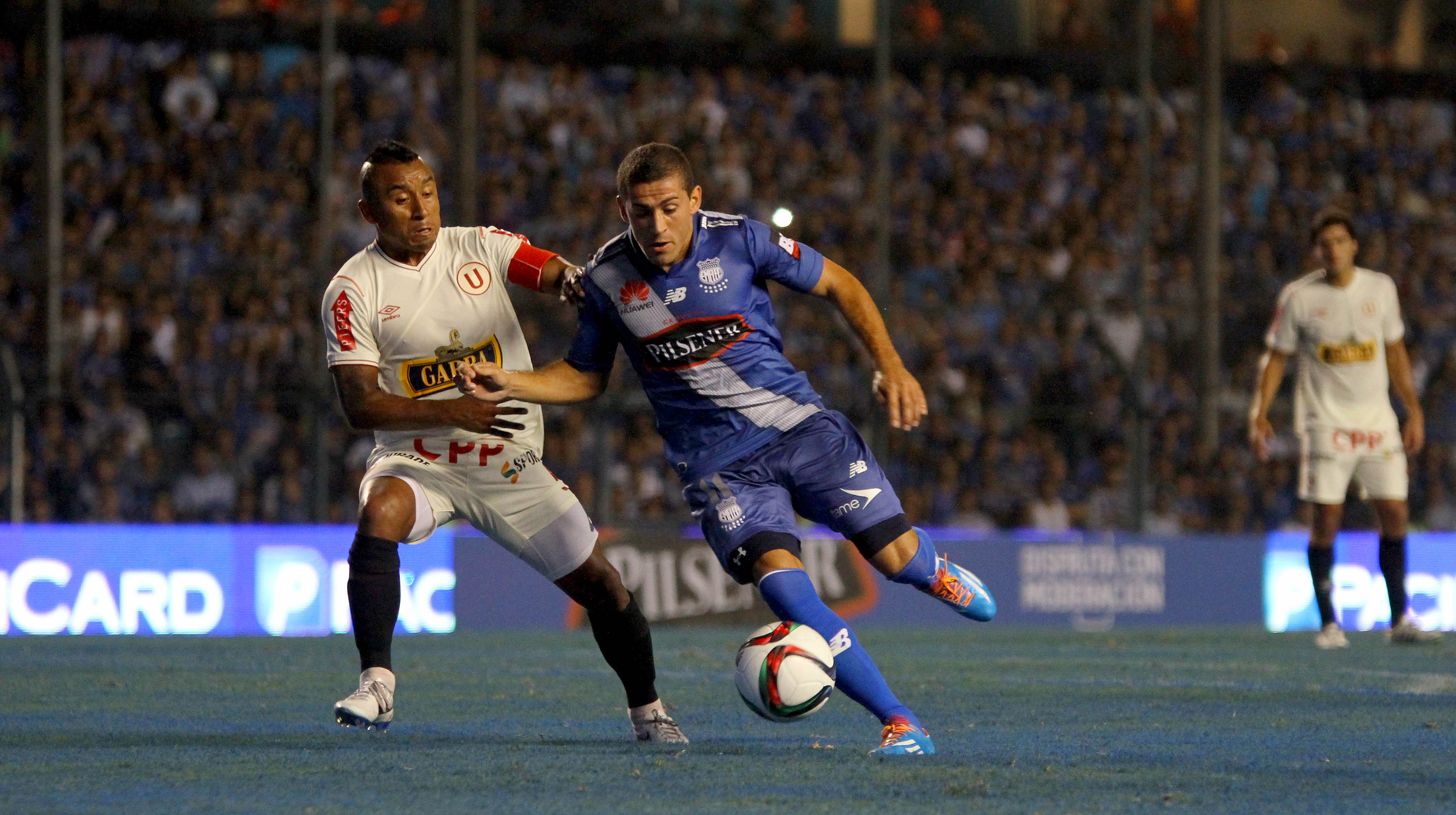

Personal information
- Full name: Mauro Raúl Fernández
- Date of birth: 31 March 1989 (age 37)
- Place of birth: Puerto Madryn, Argentina
- Height: 1.69 m (5 ft 7 in)
- Position: Winger

Team information
- Current team: Quilmes

Senior career*
Years	Team	Apps	(Gls)
2007–2011	Guillermo Brown	98	(22)
2011–2012	Estudiantes	25	(1)
2013–2014	Peñarol	26	(2)
2014–2015	Emelec	30	(3)
2015	Universidad San Martín	17	(1)
2016	Guillermo Brown	15	(4)
2016–2020	UANL	0	(0)
2016–2020	→ FC Juárez (loan)	111	(9)
2021–2022	Celaya	16	(2)
2022–2025	Guillermo Brown	66	(10)
2025–2026	Tristán Suárez	29	(2)
2026–	Quilmes	7	(0)
- * Club domestic league appearances and goals as of 17:43, 18 April 2026 (UTC)

Mauro Raúl Fernández (born 31 March 1989) is an Argentine footballer who plays as a forward for Quilmes. Fernández can play as either striker or winger on both flanks.

== Honours ==
=== Club ===
Guillermo Brown

- Torneo Argentino A (1): 2010–11

Peñarol

- Uruguayan Primera División (1): 2012–13

Emelec

- Ecuadorian Serie A (1): 2014
