= Alfonso Emilio Sánchez =

Mexican footballer (born 1994)

Alfonso Sánchez
Personal information
- Full name: Alfonso Emilio Sánchez Castillo
- Date of birth: 16 June 1994 (age 32)
- Place of birth: Aguascalientes, Mexico
- Height: 1.87 m (6 ft 2 in)
- Position: Midfielder

Team information
- Current team: Oaxaca
- Number: 27

Youth career
- 2009–2010: Kaanah, F. C.
- 2010–2011: Ixtlán
- 2011–2015: América

Senior career*
Years	Team	Apps	(Gls)
2014–2021	América	10	(0)
2016	→ Oaxaca (loan)	21	(1)
2017–2018	→ BUAP (loan)	36	(3)
2018–2019	→ Oaxaca (loan)	24	(4)
2019	→ Zacatepec (loan)	18	(0)
2019–2020	→ Tijuana (loan)	6	(0)
2021–2023	Mazatlán	40	(3)
2023	Celaya	10	(0)
2024	Sinaloa	26	(0)
2025	Atlético Morelia	3	(0)
2025–2026	Sinaloa	18	(0)
2026–	Oaxaca	4	(0)
- * Club domestic league appearances and goals as of 22 September 2026

Alfonso Emilio Sánchez Castillo (Note: In this Spanish name, the first or paternal surname is Sánchez and the second or maternal family name is Castillo.) (born 16 June 1994) is a Mexican professional footballer who plays as a midfielder for Liga de Expansión MX club Oaxaca.

== Club career ==
On 24 June 2020, América announced that Emilio returned to the team after being on loan at Tijuana.
