= Hiram Muñoz =

Mexican footballer (born 1995)

Personal information
- Full name: Hiram Eduardo Muñoz Cantú
- Date of birth: 26 May 1995 (age 31)
- Place of birth: Torreón, Coahuila, Mexico
- Height: 1.75 m (5 ft 9 in)
- Position: Centre-back

Team information
- Current team: Puntarenas
- Number: 15

Youth career
- 2010–2011: Club Calor
- 2012–2013: Monterrey
- 2014–2019: Tijuana

Senior career*
Years	Team	Apps	(Gls)
2016–2020	Tijuana	18	(0)
2019–2020	→ Sinaloa (loan)	6	(0)
2020	Lobos Zacatepec	0	(0)
2021–2023	Sinaloa	71	(0)
2023	Malacateco	13	(0)
2024–	Puntarenas	33	(0)
- * Club domestic league appearances and goals as of 6 April 2025

Hiram Eduardo Muñoz Cantú (Note: In this Spanish name, the first or paternal surname is Muñoz and the second or maternal family name is Cantú.) (born 26 May 1995) is a Mexican professional footballer who plays for Costa Rican club Puntarenas.

== Career ==
=== Youth ===
Muñoz first started his career in 2010 with Club Calor. He then briefly moved to Monterrey Youth Academy in 2012 until finally settling in Club Tijuana's youth academy in 2014. After he continued through Club Tijuana Youth Academy successfully going through U-20 and Club Tijuana Premier. He eventually broke thorough to the first team, Miguel Herrera being the coach that called him up.

=== Club Tijuana ===
On 1 April 2017, Muñoz made his professional debut in the Liga MX against Club Atlas which ended in a 3–3 draw.
