= Andrés Andrade (footballer, born 1989) =

Colombian footballer

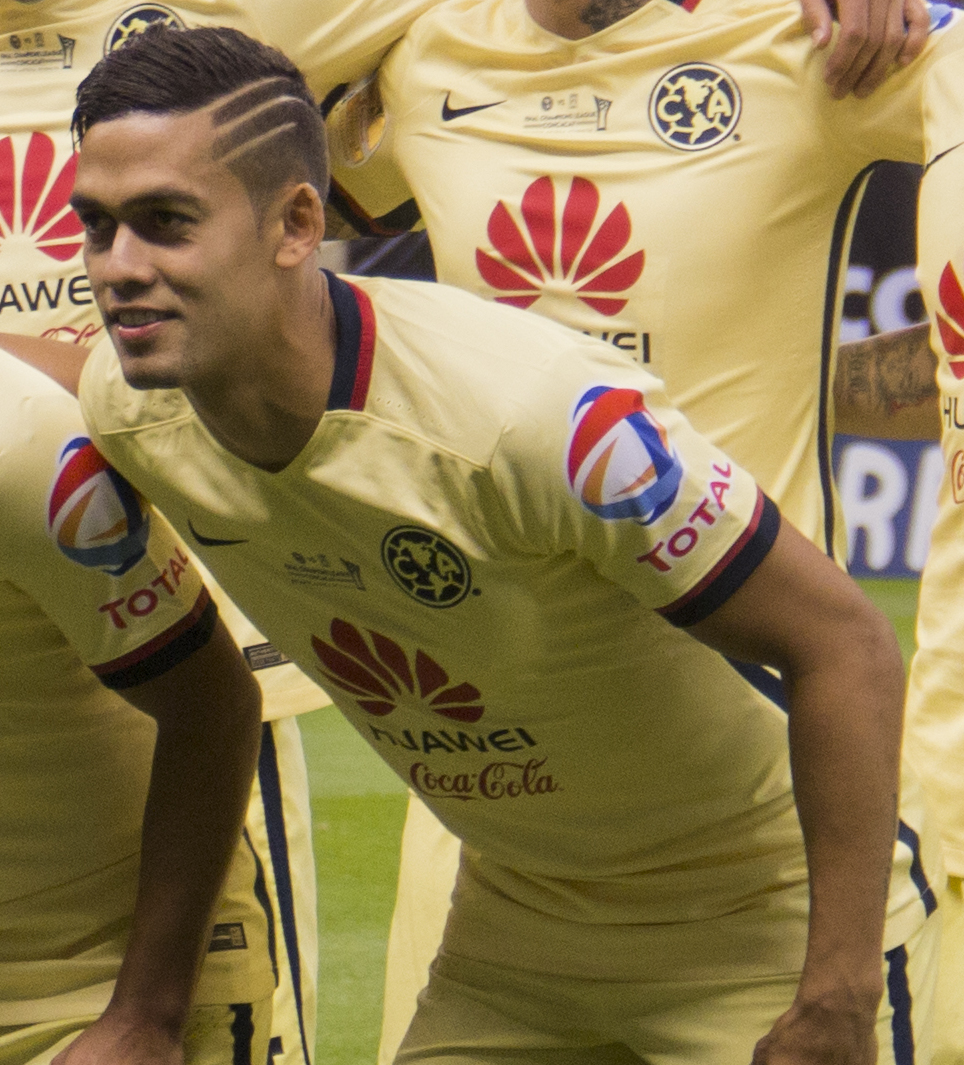
- Andrade with América in 2016

Personal information
- Full name: Andrés Felipe Andrade Torres
- Date of birth: 23 February 1989 (age 37)
- Place of birth: Cali, Colombia
- Height: 1.77 m (5 ft 10 in)
- Position: Midfielder

Team information
- Current team: Nacional

Youth career
- 2008: América de Cali

Senior career*
Years	Team	Apps	(Gls)
2009–2010	América de Cali	24	(2)
2011	Atlético Huila	30	(2)
2012–2013	Deportes Tolima	54	(9)
2013–2016	América	62	(8)
2014–2015	→ Chiapas (loan)	35	(3)
2016–2019	León	59	(8)
2018–2019	→ Atlas (loan)	31	(2)
2020–2022	Atlético Nacional	102	(17)
2023	Alianza Lima	13	(2)
2024	Deportivo Cali	18	(0)
2025	Atlético Bucaramanga	5	(0)
2025–2026	Boca Juniors de Cali	11	(1)
2026	XV de Jaú		
2026–	Nacional	9	(0)

International career^{‡}
2021	Colombia	1	(0)
- * Club domestic league appearances and goals as of 19 November 2026 ‡ National team caps and goals as of 2 September 2021

Andrés Felipe Andrade Torres (born 23 February 1989) is a Colombian professional footballer who plays as a midfielder for Nacional.

== Personal life ==
Andrade was born in Cali in 1989. His father, Adolfo Andrade, also was a professional footballer who played for Deportivo Cali, the rivals of América de Cali, as well the Colombia national team.

== Club career ==
Andrade started his career in América de Cali's youth team, and debuted for the first team on 15 August 2009 in a 1–0 defeat against Real Cartagena, coming on as a 46th-minute substitute for William Zapata. Andrade scored his first goal in a 2–1 defeat against Independiente Medellín on 26 September 2009, at 20 years of age. Andrade made a total of 24 appearances and scored 2 goals for América.

Andrade was transferred to Atlético Huila for the 2011 season, where he made a total of 40 appearances and scored 2 goals. In 2012, he was sold to Deportes Tolima, with whom reached 81 appearances and scored 14 goals. He made his first appearance in an international competition on 1 August 2012 in the 3–1 win against Deportivo Lara at the Copa Sudamericana. His first international goal was scored on 21 February 2013 in a 1–1 draw against Santa Fe at the Copa Libertadores.

On 7 July 2013, Andrade was officially transferred to recently crowned Mexican league champions Club América. He scored in a 3–0 win against Sporting San Miguelito in the CONCACAF Champions League, which was his debut for the club in an official competition. Andrade would make his league debut and score the final goal for América in the 4–2 victory over Atlante F.C. on 11 August.

On 8 June 2016, Andrade was transferred from America to León.

== International career ==
Andrade made his debut for the Colombia national team on 2 September 2021 in a Cup qualifier against Bolivia, a 1–1 away draw. He substituted Juan Fernando Quintero at half-time.

== Career statistics ==
=== Club ===
As of 10 June 2016

Appearances and goals by club, season and competition
Club	Season	League			Cup		South America		Other		Total	
Club	Season	Division	Apps	Goals	Apps	Goals	Apps	Goals	Apps	Goals	Apps	Goals
América de Cali	2009	Categoría Primera A	11	1	2	2	0	0	0	0	13	3
América de Cali	2010	Categoría Primera A	13	1	–		0	0	0	0	13	1
América de Cali	Total		24	2	2	2	10	0	0	0	26	4
Atlético Huila	2011	Categoría Primera A	30	2	10	0	0	0	0	0	40	2
Deportes Tolima	2012	Categoría Primera A	38	3	8	3	4	0	0	0	50	6
Deportes Tolima	2013	Categoría Primera A	21	6	2	1	8	1	0	0	31	8
Deportes Tolima	Total		59	9	10	4	12	1	0	0	81	14
América	2013–14	Liga MX	23	1	0	0	4	1	0	0	27	2
América	2015–16	Liga MX	39	7	1	0	10	1	6 (Note: Includes FIFA Club World Cup and International Champions Cup.)	1	56	9
América	Total		62	8	1	0	14	2	6	1	83	11
Chiapas (loan)	2014–15	Liga MX	35	3	8	3	0	0	0	0	43	6
Career total			210	24	31	9	26	3	6	1	273	37

== Honours ==
América

- CONCACAF Champions League: 2015–16
