= Irving Zurita =

Mexican footballer (born 1991)

Personal information
- Full name: Irving Mauro Zurita García
- Date of birth: 27 September 1991 (age 35)
- Place of birth: Mexico City, Mexico
- Height: 1.68 m (5 ft 6 in)
- Position: Left-back

Youth career
- Monterrey
- 2009–2012: Atlante

Senior career*
Years	Team	Apps	(Gls)
2012–2020	Atlante	66	(3)
2013	→ Pioneros de Cancún (loan)	11	(4)
2013	→ Inter Playa del Carmen (loan)	14	(0)
2014	→ Delfines del Carmen (loan)	10	(1)
2014–2015	→ Pioneros de Cancún (loan)	24	(2)
2018	→ Lobos BUAP (loan)	2	(0)
2019	→ Atlas (loan)	13	(0)
2020	Querétaro	12	(0)
2021–2022	Sonora	33	(0)
2022	Atlético Morelia	4	(0)
- * Club domestic league appearances and goals as of 15 May 2022

Irving Mauro Zurita García (born 27 September 1991) is a Mexican professional footballer who plays as a left-back for Liga de Expansión MX club Atlético Morelia.
