= Edson García =

Mexican footballer (born 1998)

Personal information
- Full name: Edson Aldair García Martínez
- Date of birth: 1 March 1998 (age 28)
- Place of birth: Rioverde, San Luis Potosí, Mexico
- Height: 1.82 m (6 ft 0 in)
- Position: Defender

Team information
- Current team: Tlaxcala
- Number: 21

Senior career*
| Years | Team | Apps | (Gls) |
| 2017–2021 | Atlas | 0 | (0) |
| 2019 | → Veracruz (loan) | 12 | (0) |
| 2019–2021 | → Tampico Madero (loan) | 57 | (2) |
| 2022–2023 | Cancún | 23 | (0) |
| 2024 | Chihuahua | 7 | (0) |
| 2024–2026 | Jaiba Brava | 0 | (0) |
| 2026– | Tlaxcala | 0 | (0) |

International career^{‡}
| 2018 | Mexico U21 | 3 | (0) |
Medal record
Men's football
Representing Mexico
Toulon Tournament
| Runner-up | 2018 France | Team |
- * Club domestic league appearances and goals as of 21 October 2022 ‡ National team caps and goals as of 29 May 2019

Edson Aldair García Martínez (born 1 March 1998) is a Mexican professional footballer who plays as a defender for Liga de Expansión MX club Tlaxcala.

== International career ==
García was included in the under-21 roster that participated in the 2018 Toulon Tournament, where Mexico would finish runners-up.

== Career statistics ==
=== Club ===
As of 29 May 2019

| Club | Season | League | | | Cup | | Continental | | Other | | Total | |
| Club | Season | Division | Apps | Goals | Apps | Goals | Apps | Goals | Apps | Goals | Apps | Goals |
|---|---|---|---|---|---|---|---|---|---|---|---|---|
| Atlas | 2017–18 | Liga MX | – | | 6 | 0 | – | | – | | 6 | 0 |
| Atlas | 2018–19 | Liga MX | 0 | 0 | – | | – | | – | | 0 | 0 |
| Atlas | Total | | 0 | 0 | 6 | 0 | 0 | 0 | 0 | 0 | 6 | 0 |
| Veracruz (loan) | 2018–19 | Liga MX | 12 | 0 | 5 | 0 | – | | – | | 17 | 0 |
| Career total | | | 12 | 0 | 11 | 0 | 0 | 0 | 0 | 0 | 23 | 0 |

== Honours ==
Tampico Madero

- Liga de Expansión MX: Guardianes 2020
