= Bryan Colula =

Mexican footballer (born 1996)

Personal information
- Full name: Bryan Colula Alarcón
- Date of birth: 6 April 1996 (age 30)
- Place of birth: Xalapa, Veracruz, Mexico
- Height: 1.78 m (5 ft 10 in)
- Position: Right-back

Team information
- Current team: León
- Number: 4

Youth career
- 2012–2015: América

Senior career*
Years	Team	Apps	(Gls)
2015–2021	América	2	(0)
2016	→ Venados (loan)	27	(0)
2017–2018	→ Necaxa (loan)	2	(0)
2018	→ Oaxaca (loan)	0	(0)
2019	→ Venados (loan)	12	(0)
2019	→ Zacatepec (loan)	18	(3)
2020	→ Tijuana (loan)	2	(0)
2021–2025	Mazatlán	125	(7)
2026–	León	18	(1)
- * Club domestic league appearances and goals as of 20 October 2026

Bryan Colula Alarcón (born 6 April 1996) is a Mexican professional footballer who plays as a right-back for Liga MX club León.

== Honours ==
Necaxa

- Copa MX: Clausura 2018
