= Jorge Segura (footballer) =

Colombian footballer (born 1997)

Personal information
- Full name: Jorge Andrés Segura Portocarrero
- Date of birth: 18 January 1997 (age 29)
- Place of birth: Zarzal, Colombia
- Height: 1.94 m (6 ft 4 in)
- Position: Center back

Team information
- Current team: FC Zürich
- Number: 4

Senior career*
Years	Team	Apps	(Gls)
2016–2017	Envigado	31	(2)
2017–2023	Watford	0	(0)
2017–2018	→ Valladolid B (loan)	16	(2)
2018	→ Independiente Medellín (loan)	26	(0)
2019	→ Atlas (loan)	18	(1)
2020–2021	→ Atlético Nacional (loan)	8	(0)
2021–2022	→ America de Cali (loan)	26	(0)
2022	→ Independiente Medellín (loan)	7	(2)
2023–2025	Lokomotiv Plovdiv	71	(4)
2025–	FC Zürich	8	(1)

International career
2017	Colombia U20	4	(0)
- * Club domestic league appearances and goals as of 26 May 2026

Jorge Andrés Segura Portocarrero (born 18 January 1997) is a Colombian professional footballer who plays as a center back for FC Zürich.

== Club career ==
In March 2017, it was confirmed that Segura would be joining Watford from that summer. In September 2020, after loan spells to Spain and Mexico, Segura returned to Colombia on loan, joining Atlético Nacional on loan until June 2021. In 2023, his contract with Watford was terminated.

In March 2023, Segura signed for Bulgarian First League club Lokomotiv Plovdiv on a two-and-a-half-year deal.

Seguar joined FC Zürich in August 2025.
