= Manu Balda =

Ecuadorian footballer (born 1992)

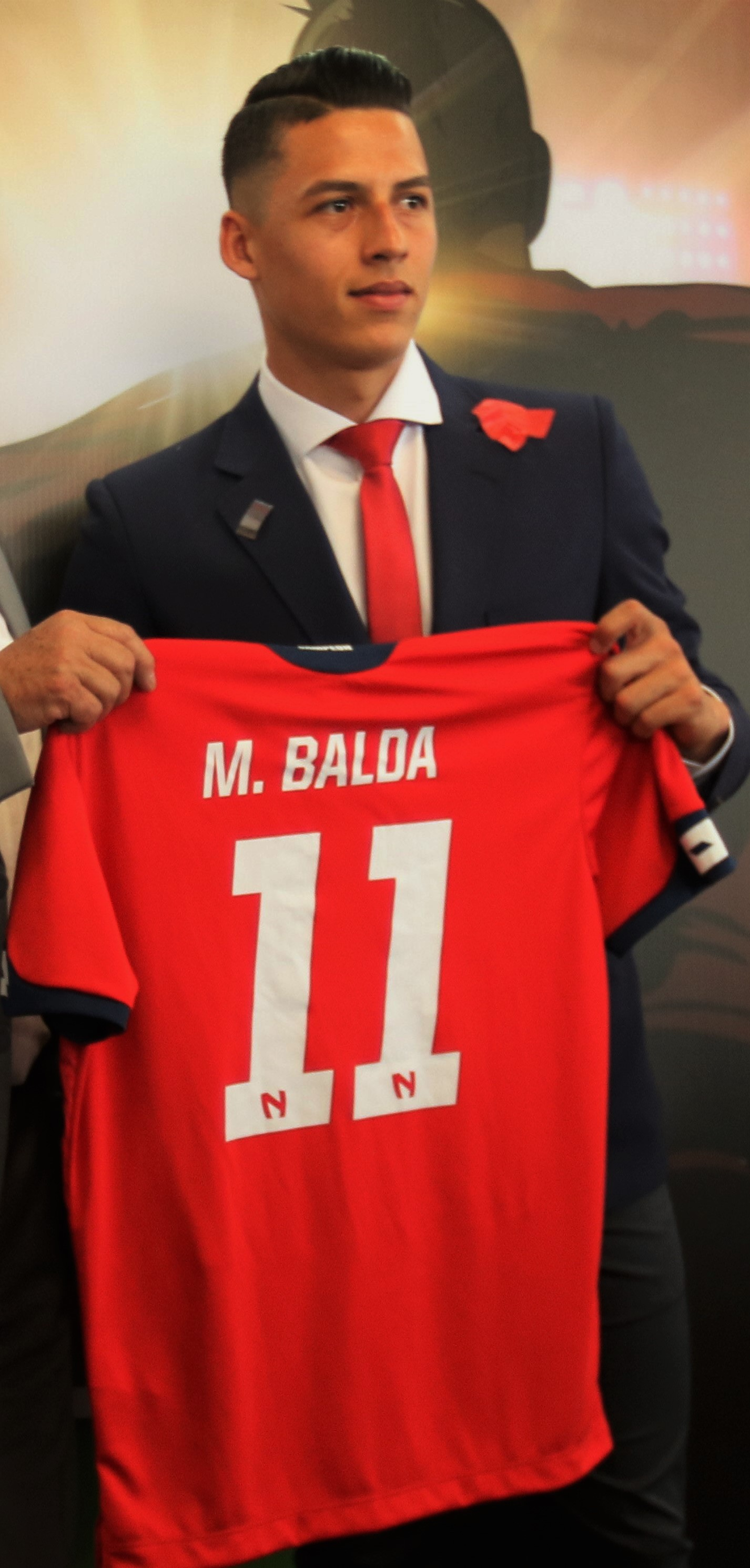

Personal information
- Full name: Faberth Manuel Balda Rodríguez
- Date of birth: 21 February 1992 (age 34)
- Place of birth: Portoviejo, Ecuador
- Height: 1.77 m (5 ft 10 in)
- Position: Winger

Team information
- Current team: C.D. El Nacional
- Number: 9

Youth career
- Hospitalet
- Gramenet

Senior career*
Years	Team	Apps	(Gls)
2010–2011	Gramenet B	5	(1)
2010–2013	Gramenet	66	(10)
2013–2014	Prat	29	(2)
2013–2014	Cornellà	14	(5)
2014–2015	Badalona	16	(3)
2015	Panthrakikos	8	(0)
2015–2016	Badalona	19	(2)
2016–2019	El Nacional	123	(25)
2019–2020	Atlas	4	(1)
2020	Santos	0	(0)
2021	Guayaquil City	0	(0)
2022	Deportivo Cuenca	5	(0)
2023–	El Nacional	0	(0)
- * Club domestic league appearances and goals as of 26 November 2020

Faberth Manuel 'Manu' Balda Rodríguez (born 21 February 1992) is an Ecuadorian footballer who plays for C.D. El Nacional as a winger.

== Club career ==
Born in Portoviejo, Balda moved to Barcelona in 2001, aged nine, and started his career at CE L'Hospitalet's youth setup. He finished his formation with UDA Gramenet, and made his senior debuts with the reserves in the 2010–11 campaign; he also appeared with the main squad, being relegated from Segunda División B.

On 30 January 2013 Balda moved to AE Prat, also in the third level. He suffered another relegation in 2013–14, being mostly used as a backup.

On 17 July 2014 Balda signed for fellow league team CF Badalona, and featured regularly for the club during his spell. On 19 January of the following year he rescinded his link and moved to Super League Greece side Panthrakikos

Balda played his first match as a professional on 24 January 2015, coming on as a late substitute in a 1–0 home win against Levadiakos F.C.
