= Yorgan Agblemagnon =

Togolese footballer (born 1999)

Personal information
- Full name: Yorgan Edem Agblemagnon
- Date of birth: 9 July 1999 (age 27)
- Place of birth: Vierzon, France
- Height: 1.89 m (6 ft 2 in)
- Position: Goalkeeper

Youth career
- 2013–2017: Le Havre

Senior career*
Years	Team	Apps	(Gls)
2016–2017	Le Havre II	1	(0)
2017–2018	Nacional	0	(0)
2018–2019	Ponferradina B	11	(0)
2020	Châteauneuf-sur-Loire	4	(0)

International career^{‡}
2018	Togo U20	2	(0)
2017	Togo	2	(0)
- * Club domestic league appearances and goals as of 18:46, 15 April 2022 (UTC) ‡ National team caps and goals as of 18:46, 15 April 2022 (UTC)

Yorgan Edem Agblemagnon (born 9 July 1999) is a footballer who plays as a goalkeeper. Born in France, he made two appearances for the Togo national team in 2017.

== International career ==
Agblemagnon was born in France, the son of former Togolese goalkeeper Guy Agblemagnon. He debuted for the Togo national team in a friendly 0–0 tie with Libya on 24 March 2017. He has also represented his country at the U20 level.
