= Andrés Ávila =

Mexican footballer (born 1998)

Personal information
- Full name: José Andrés Ávila De Santiago
- Date of birth: 1 May 1998 (age 28)
- Place of birth: Villanueva, Zacatecas, Mexico
- Height: 1.77 m (5 ft 9 1/2 in)
- Position: Attacking midfielder

Team information
- Current team: Zacatecas
- Number: 10

Youth career
- 2012–2017: Atlas

Senior career*
Years	Team	Apps	(Gls)
2017–2020	Atlas	6	(0)
2019–2020	→ Tampico Madero (loan)	33	(3)
2021–2023	Santos Laguna	14	(1)
2023–	Zacatecas	60	(11)

International career
2018	Mexico U21	2	(0)
- * Club domestic league appearances and goals as of 28 March 2025

José Andrés Ávila De Santiago (born 1 May 1998) is a Mexican professional footballer who plays as an attacking midfielder for Liga de Expansión MX club Zacatecas.

== Club career ==
=== Youth ===
Ávila joined Atlas's youth academy in 2012. He then continued through Club Atlas Youth Academy successfully going through U-15, U-17 and U-20. Until finally breaking thorough to the first team, José Guadalupe Cruz being the coach promoting Ávila to first team.

=== Atlas ===
On October 20, 2017, Ávila made his debut in the Liga MX against Club Tijuana playing 71 minutes in the 1–0 win.

=== Santos Laguna ===
On January 4, 2021, his transfer Santos Laguna from the Liga MX was made official.

== Career statistics ==
=== Club ===
As of match played 20 January 2023

Appearances and goals by club, season and competition
Club	Season	League			Cup		Continental		Other		Total	
Club	Season	Division	Apps	Goals	Apps	Goals	Apps	Goals	Apps	Goals	Apps	Goals
Atlas	2016–17	Liga MX	—		2	0	—		—		2	0
Atlas	2017–18	Liga MX	2	0	2	0	—		—		4	0
Atlas	2018–19	Liga MX	4	0	1	0	—		—		5	0
Atlas	Total		6	0	5	0	—		—		11	0
Tampico Madero (loan)	2019–20	Liga de Expansión MX	16	0	—		—		—		16	0
Tampico Madero (loan)	2020–21	Liga de Expansión MX	17	3	—		—		—		17	3
Tampico Madero (loan)	Total		33	3	—		—		—		33	3
Santos Laguna	2020–21	Liga MX	—		—		1 (Note: Appearance in Leagues Cup)	0	—		1	0
Santos Laguna	2021–22	Liga MX	8	1	—		—		—		8	1
Santos Laguna	2022–23	Liga MX	6	0	—		—		—		6	0
Santos Laguna	Total		14	1	—		1	0	—		15	1
Career total			53	4	5	0	1	0	0	0	59	4

== Honours ==
Tampico Madero

- Liga de Expansión MX: Guard1anes 2020
