= Jesús Isijara =

Mexican footballer (born 1989)

Personal information
- Full name: Jesús Antonio Isijara Rodríguez
- Date of birth: 26 September 1989 (age 37)
- Place of birth: Navolato, Sinaloa, Mexico
- Height: 1.79 m (5 ft 10 in)
- Position: Winger

Youth career
- 2007–2009: Necaxa

Senior career*
Years	Team	Apps	(Gls)
2009– 2010	Orizaba	27	(4)
2010–2011	San Luis	4	(0)
2011–2017	Necaxa	188	(22)
2018–2021	Santos Laguna	53	(2)
2019–2020	→ Atlas (loan)	56	(7)
2022	Municipal	20	(1)
- * Club domestic league appearances and goals as of 12 June 2022

Jesús Antonio Isijara Rodríguez (Note: In this Spanish name, the first or paternal surname is Isijara and the second or maternal family name is Rodríguez.) (born 26 September 1989), also known as El Ratón, is a Mexican professional footballer who plays as a winger.

== International career ==
Isijara was named to the preliminary list of the senior national team for the 2017 CONCACAF Gold Cup but was eventually cut off.

== Honours ==
Santos Laguna

- Liga MX: Clausura 2018
