= Édgar Hernández (footballer, born 1982) =

Mexican footballer (born 1982)

Edgar Hernández
Personal information
- Full name: Edgar Adolfo Hernández Téllez
- Date of birth: 27 August 1982 (age 44)
- Place of birth: Reynosa, Tamaulipas, Mexico
- Height: 1.85 m (6 ft 1 in)
- Position: Goalkeeper

Team information
- Current team: Toluca U-19 (Manager)

Youth career
- Tigres UANL

Senior career*
Years	Team	Apps	(Gls)
2003–2004	América	0	(0)
2004	→ San Luis (loan)	20	(0)
2005–2007	Tigres UANL	44	(0)
2007–2013	Chiapas	117	(0)
2010–2011	→ Puebla (loan)	1	(0)
2013–2017	Querétaro	51	(0)
2017–2018	→ Oaxaca (loan)	42	(0)
2018–2020	Atlas	2	(0)
2021–2022	Necaxa	17	(0)
Total		294	(0)

Managerial career
- 2023: Necaxa Reserves and Academy
- 2023–2024: Necaxa (Assistant)
- 2025–2026: Necaxa Reserves and Academy
- 2026–: Toluca Reserves and Academy
- * Club domestic league appearances and goals

Edgar Adolfo Hernández Téllez (born 27 August 1982) is a Mexican professional football coach and a former goalkeeper. He works as a coach at Necaxa Reserves and Academy.

== Honours ==
Querétaro

- Copa MX: Apertura 2016

Oaxaca

- Ascenso MX: Apertura 2017

Hernández had the lowest overall (22) of any player in the videogame FIFA 06.
