= Clausura 2022 Liga MX final phase =

Tournament details
- Dates: 7–29 May 2022
- Teams: 12

Tournament statistics
- Matches played: 18
- Goals scored: 57 (3.17 per match)
- Attendance: 596,379 (33,132 per match)

The Torneo Grita México Clausura 2022 (stylized as Grita... México C22) Liga MX final phase was played between 7 May and 29 May 2022. A total of twelve teams competed in the final phase to decide the champions of the Clausura 2022 Liga MX season. For the fourth straight season, an additional qualifying round, the reclassification or repechaje, was employed, which expanded the number of playoff spots to 12.

Both finalists qualified to the 2023 CONCACAF Champions League.

Atlas defeated Pachuca 3–2 on aggregate to win their second straight title and third overall. As winners of both the Apertura 2021 and Clausura 2022 seasons, Atlas were automatically awarded the 2022 Campeón de Campeones.

== Qualified teams ==
The following teams qualified for the championship stage.

In the following tables, the number of appearances, last appearance, and previous best result count only those in the short tournament era starting from Invierno 1996 (not counting those in the long tournament era from 1943–44 to 1995–96).

Qualified directly to quarter-finals (4 teams)
Seed	Team	Points (GD)	Date of qualification	Appearance	Last appearance	Previous best	Ref.
1	Pachuca	38	7 April 2022 (REC); 16 April 2022 (QF)	37th	Guardianes 2021	Champions (5 times)	
2	UANL	33	10 April 2022 (REC); 16 April 2022 (QF)	29th	Apertura 2021	Champions (5 times)	
3	Atlas	27	19 April 2022(REC); 30 April 2022 (QF)	24th	Apertura 2021	Champions (Apertura 2021)	
4	América	26 (+7)	23 April 2022 (REC); 1 May 2022 (QF)	37th	Apertura 2021	Champions (5 times)	

Qualified to Reclassification round (8 teams)
Seed	Team	Points (GD)	Date of qualification	Appearance	Last appearance	Previous best	Ref.
5	Puebla	26 (+6)	16 April 2022	11th	Apertura 2021	Semifinals (3 times)	
6	Guadalajara	26 (+4, 25 GF)	23 April 2022	29th	Apertura 2021	Champions (3 times)	
7	Monterrey	26 (+4, 21 GF)	19 April 2022	27th	Apertura 2021	Champions (4 times)	
8	Cruz Azul	25	21 April 2022	32nd	Apertura 2021	Champions (2 times)	
9	Necaxa	23 (0)	22 April 2022	19th	Guardianes 2020	Champions (Invierno 1998)	
10	Atlético San Luis	23 (–1)	24 April 2022	2nd	Apertura 2021	Reclassification (Apertura 2021)	
11	UNAM	22	1 May 2022	25th	Apertura 2021	Champions (4 times)	
12	Mazatlán	21	1 May 2022	1st	Debut	Debut	

== Format ==
=== Reclassification ===
- All rounds were played in a single game hosted by the higher seed
- If a game ended in a draw, it proceeded directly to a penalty shoot-out.

=== Liguilla ===
- Teams were re-seeded each round.
- The winners of the Reclassification matches were seeded based on their ranking in the classification table.
- Team with more goals on aggregate after two matches advanced.
- No away goals rule is applied in neither round; if the two teams were tied on aggregate, the higher-seeded team advanced.
- In the final, if the two teams were tied after both legs, the match would go to extra time and, if necessary, a shoot-out.
- Both finalists qualified to the 2023 CONCACAF Champions League.

== Reclassification ==
=== Summary ===
Matches took place on 7–8 May 2022.

Team 1	Score	Team 2
Puebla	2–2 (3–1 p)	Mazatlán
Guadalajara	4–1	UNAM
Monterrey	2–2 (1–3 p)	Atlético San Luis
Cruz Azul	1–1 (3–1 p)	Necaxa

=== Matches ===
7 May 2022
17:45 CDT (UTC−5)

Cruz Azul	1–1	Necaxa
Escobar 56'	Report	Aguirre 88'
Penalties
Romero (penalty scored); Aldrete (penalty scored); Abram (penalty scored)	3–1	(penalty missed) Formiliano; (penalty scored) Araos; (penalty missed) Oliveros; (penalty missed) Palma

Estadio Azteca, Mexico City
Attendance: 29,073
Referee: Fernando Guerrero (Mexico City)

7 May 2022
20:06 CDT (UTC−5)

Monterrey	2–2	Atlético San Luis
Janssen 18'; Rodríguez 90+6'	Report	Waller 47'; Murillo 53'
Penalties
Janssen (penalty missed); Meza (penalty missed); Ortiz (penalty scored); Pizarro (penalty missed)	1–3	(penalty scored) Berterame; (penalty scored) Chávez; (penalty scored) Güémez; (penalty missed) Waller

Estadio BBVA, Guadalupe
Attendance: 38,614
Referee: Jorge Antonio Pérez (Veracruz)

8 May 2022
17:00 CDT (UTC−5)

Puebla	2–2	Mazatlán
De Buen 4'; Segovia 14'	Report	Rubio 37'; Vidrio 90+1'
Penalties
Mancuello (penalty scored); De Buen (penalty scored); Corral (penalty missed); Reyes (penalty scored)	3–1	(penalty missed) Padilla; (penalty scored) Sansores; (penalty missed) Díaz; (penalty missed) Fabián

Estadio Cuauhtémoc, Puebla
Attendance: 29,105
Referee: César Arturo Ramos (Sinaloa)

8 May 2022
19:15 CDT (UTC−5)

Guadalajara	4–1	UNAM
Calderón 12'; Beltrán 51'; Macías 87'; Vega 89'	Report	Diogo 19'

Estadio Akron, Zapopan
Attendance: 37,508
Referee: Marco Antonio Ortiz (Durango)

== Seeding ==
The following is the final seeding for the final phase. The winners of the Reclassification matches were seeded based on their position in the classification table.

Seed	Team	Pld	W	D	L	GF	GA	GD	Pts
1	Pachuca	17	12	2	3	30	15	+15	38
2	UANL	17	10	3	4	30	20	+10	33
3	Atlas	17	7	6	4	21	15	+6	27
4	América	17	7	5	5	24	17	+7	26
5	Puebla	17	7	5	5	25	19	+6	26
6	Guadalajara	17	7	5	5	25	21	+4	26
7	Cruz Azul	17	7	4	6	20	17	+3	25
8	Atlético San Luis	17	7	2	8	21	22	−1	23

Source: Liga MX
Rules for classification: 1) Points; 2) Goal difference; 3) Goals scored; 4) Away goals scored; 5) Drawing of lots.

== Bracket ==
Quarter-finals
1	Pachuca	2	3	5
8	Atlético San Luis	2	2	4
4	América	1	3	4
5	Puebla	1	2	3
2	UANL (s)	1	0	1
7	Cruz Azul	0	1	1
3	Atlas	2	1	3
6	Guadalajara	1	1	2

Semi-finals
1	Pachuca	1	3	4
4	América	1	0	1
2	UANL	0	0	0
3	Atlas	3	2	5

Finals
1	Pachuca	0	2	2
3	Atlas	2	1	3

== Quarter-finals ==
The first legs were played on 11–12 May, and the second legs were played on 14–15 May.

Team 1	Agg.	Team 2	1st leg	2nd leg
Atlético San Luis	4–5	Pachuca	2–2	2–3
Cruz Azul	1–1 (s)	UANL	0–1	1–0
Guadalajara	2–3	Atlas	1–2	1–1
Puebla	3–4	América	1–1	2–3

=== First leg ===
11 May 2022
19:00 CDT (UTC−5)

Atlético San Luis	2–2	Pachuca
Berterame 25' (pen.); Sanabria 90+4'	Report	Ibáñez 5', 77'

Estadio Alfonso Lastras, San Luis Potosí
Attendance: 16,605
Referee: Óscar Mejía García (Mexico City)

11 May 2022
21:05 CDT (UTC−5)

Puebla	1–1	América
Aristeguieta 55'	Report	Cáceres 80'

Estadio Cuauhtémoc, Puebla
Attendance: 43,921
Referee: Luis Enrique Santander (Guanajuato)

12 May 2022
19:00 CDT (UTC−5)

Cruz Azul	0–1	UANL
	Report	Dueñas 44'

Estadio Azteca, Mexico City
Attendance: 28,974
Referee: Fernando Hernández Gómez (Mexico City)

12 May 2022
21:05 CDT (UTC−5)

Guadalajara	1–2	Atlas
Calderón 54'	Report	Márquez 28', 44'

Estadio Akron, Zapopan
Attendance: 34,780
Referee: Jorge Antonio Pérez (Veracruz)

=== Second leg ===
14 May 2022
18:00 CDT (UTC−5)

América	3–2	Puebla
Martín 42'; Valdés 58' (pen.); Zendejas 73'	Report	Reyes 45+2'; Aristeguieta 90+7' (pen.)

Estadio Azteca, Mexico City
Attendance: 51,186
Referee: Fernando Guerrero (Mexico City)

América won 4–3 on aggregate.

14 May 2022
20:05 CDT (UTC−5)

Pachuca	3–2	Atlético San Luis
Ibáñez 47', 90+6'; Cabral 67'	Report	Chávez 52'; Hernández 90+3'

Estadio Hidalgo, Pachuca
Attendance: 9,565
Referee: Marco Antonio Ortiz (Durango)

Pachuca won 5–4 on aggregate.

15 May 2022
18:00 CDT (UTC−5)

Atlas	1–1	Guadalajara
Chalá 45+5'	Report	Macías 89'

Estadio Jalisco, Guadalajara
Attendance: 32,746
Referee: Fernando Hernández Gómez (Mexico City)

Atlas won 3–2 on aggregate.

15 May 2022
20:05 CDT (UTC−5)

UANL	0–1	Cruz Azul
	Report	Tabó 19'

Estadio Universitario, San Nicolás de los Garza
Attendance: 40,161
Referee: César Arturo Ramos (Sinaloa)

1–1 on aggregate. UANL advanced due to being the higher seeded team in the classification table.

== Semi-finals ==
The first legs were played on 18–19 May, and the second legs were played on 21–22 May.

Team 1	Agg.	Team 2	1st leg	2nd leg
América	1–4	Pachuca	1–1	0–3
Atlas	5–0	UANL	3–0	2–0

=== First leg ===
18 May 2022
21:00 CDT (UTC−5)

Atlas	3–0	UANL
Furch 40'; Reyes 60'; Quiñones 90'	Report

Estadio Jalisco, Guadalajara
Attendance: 20,684
Referee: Jorge Antonio Pérez (Veracruz)

19 May 2022
20:00 CDT (UTC−5)

América	1–1	Pachuca
Valdés 54'	Report	Ibáñez 82' (pen.)

Estadio Azteca, Mexico City
Attendance: 62,633
Referee: Marco Antonio Ortiz (Durango)

=== Second leg ===
21 May 2022
20:00 CDT (UTC−5)

UANL	0–2	Atlas
	Report	Quiñones 45'; Rocha 90+10' (pen.)

Estadio Universitario, San Nicolás de los Garza
Attendance: 41,635
Referee: César Arturo Ramos (Sinaloa)

Atlas won 5–0 on aggregate. UANL originally won the second leg 4–2, however, the club had nine foreign players on the field (clubs are only allowed a maximum of eight), thus, UANL's four goals were annulled.

22 May 2022
20:06 CDT (UTC−5)

Pachuca	3–0	América
Ibarra 13', 66'; Sánchez 44'	Report

Estadio Hidalgo, Pachuca
Attendance: 19,310
Referee: Fernando Hernández Gómez (Mexico City)

Pachuca won 4–1 on aggregate.

== Finals ==
The first leg was played on 26 May, and the second leg was played on 29 May.

Team 1	Agg.	Team 2	1st leg	2nd leg
Atlas	3–2	Pachuca	2–0	1–2

=== First leg ===
26 May 2022
21:00 CDT (UTC−5)

Atlas	2–0	Pachuca
Reyes 26'; Quiñones 90+3'	Report

Estadio Jalisco, Guadalajara
Attendance: 37,841
Referee: Marco Antonio Ortiz (Durango)

==== Details ====
Atlas	Pachuca

GK	12	(Colombia) Camilo Vargas
DF	5	(Peru) Anderson Santamaría		(substituted off) 75'
DF	2	(Argentina) Hugo Nervo
DF	15	(Argentina) Emanuel Aguilera		(substituted off) 69'
MF	4	(Mexico) José Abella
MF	6	(Mexico) Édgar Zaldívar
MF	26	(Mexico) Aldo Rocha (c)	(yellow card) 70'
MF	14	(Mexico) Luis Reyes
MF	21	(Ecuador) Aníbal Chalá	(yellow card) 58'
FW	9	(Argentina) Julio Furch	(yellow card) 76'	(substituted off) 81'
FW	33	(Colombia) Julián Quiñones
Substitutions:
GK	1	(Mexico) José Hernández
DF	13	(Mexico) Gaddi Aguirre		(substituted on) 75'
DF	15	(Mexico) Diego Barbosa		(substituted on) 69'
MF	11	(Mexico) Brayan Garnica
MF	18	(Mexico) Jeremy Márquez		(substituted on) 81'
MF	19	(Mexico) Edyairth Ortega
MF	32	(Uruguay) Lucas Rodríguez
FW	22	(Argentina) Franco Troyansky
FW	28	(Mexico) Christopher Trejo
FW	199	(Mexico) Jonathan Herrera
Manager:
(Argentina) Diego Cocca

GK	5	(Argentina) Oscar Ustari (c)
DF	3	(Mexico) Kevin Álvarez
DF	22	(Argentina) Gustavo Cabral	(yellow card) 70'
DF	4	(Mexico) Miguel Tapias
DF	195	(Mexico) Daniel Aceves
MF	28	(Mexico) Érick Sánchez	(yellow card) 90+5'
MF	24	(Mexico) Luis Chávez
MF	11	(Colombia) Avilés Hurtado		(substituted off) 79'
MF	6	(Mexico) Víctor Guzmán		(substituted off) 89'
MF	30	(Ecuador) Romario Ibarra		(substituted off) 46'
FW	7	(Argentina) Nicolás Ibáñez
Substitutions:
GK	25	(Mexico) Carlos Moreno
DF	12	(Colombia) Geisson Perea
DF	19	(Mexico) Fernando Navarro		(substituted on) 46'
DF	23	(Colombia) Óscar Murillo
DF	33	(Mexico) José Castillo
MF	21	(Uruguay) Jesús Trindade
MF	35	(Mexico) Bryan González
MF	226	(Mexico) Pedro Pedraza
FW	9	(Mexico) Roberto de la Rosa		(substituted on) 79'
FW	190	(Mexico) Jesús Hernández		(substituted on) 89'
Manager:
(Uruguay) Guillermo Almada

Assistant referees:
Miguel Ángel Hernández (Puebla)
Enedina Caudillo Gómez (Michoacán)
Fourth official:
Luis Enrique Santander (Guanajuato)
Video assistant referee:
Erick Yair Miranda (Guanajuato)
Assistant video assistant referee:
Juan Joel Rangel (Mexico City)

==== Statistics ====
Statistic	Atlas	Pachuca
Goals scored	2	0
Total shots	13	18
Shots on target	4	5
Saves	5	2
Ball possession	40%	60%
Corner kicks	4	7
Fouls committed	15	10
Offsides	2	0
Yellow cards	3	2
Red cards	0	0

=== Second leg ===
29 May 2022
20:10 CDT (UTC−5)

Pachuca	2–1	Atlas
Ibarra 8'; Ibáñez 45+9'	Report	Furch 45' (pen.)

Estadio Hidalgo, Pachuca
Attendance: 22,038
Referee: Fernando Hernández Gómez (Mexico City)

Atlas won 3–2 on aggregate.

==== Details ====
Pachuca	Atlas

GK	5	(Argentina) Oscar Ustari (c)
DF	3	(Mexico) Kevin Álvarez	(yellow card) 58'
DF	23	(Colombia) Óscar Murillo
DF	22	(Argentina) Gustavo Cabral
DF	195	(Mexico) Daniel Aceves	(yellow card) 37'	(substituted off) 59'
MF	28	(Mexico) Érick Sánchez		(substituted off) 86'
MF	24	(Mexico) Luis Chávez	(yellow card) 90+5'
MF	6	(Mexico) Víctor Guzmán
MF	30	(Ecuador) Romario Ibarra		(substituted off) 78'
MF	11	(Colombia) Avilés Hurtado		(substituted off) 59'
FW	7	(Argentina) Nicolás Ibáñez
Substitutions:
GK	25	(Mexico) Carlos Moreno
DF	4	(Mexico) Miguel Tapias
DF	12	(Colombia) Geisson Perea
DF	19	(Mexico) Fernando Navarro		(substituted on) 59'
DF	33	(Mexico) José Castillo
MF	21	(Uruguay) Jesús Trindade
MF	35	(Mexico) Bryan González		(substituted on) 59'
FW	9	(Mexico) Roberto de la Rosa		(substituted on) 78'
FW	190	(Mexico) Jesús Hernández		(substituted on) 86'
FW	229	(Mexico) Illian Hernández
Manager:
(Uruguay) Guillermo Almada

GK	12	(Colombia) Camilo Vargas	(yellow card) 45+8'
DF	5	(Peru) Anderson Santamaría		(substituted off) 46'
DF	2	(Argentina) Hugo Nervo
DF	15	(Argentina) Emanuel Aguilera
MF	4	(Mexico) José Abella
MF	6	(Mexico) Édgar Zaldívar
MF	26	(Mexico) Aldo Rocha (c)	(yellow card) 40'
MF	14	(Mexico) Luis Reyes	(yellow card) 45+4'
MF	21	(Ecuador) Aníbal Chalá	(red card) 83'
FW	33	(Colombia) Julián Quiñones
FW	9	(Argentina) Julio Furch		(substituted off) 86'
Substitutions:
GK	1	(Mexico) José Hernández
DF	13	(Mexico) Gaddi Aguirre		(substituted on) 86'
DF	15	(Mexico) Diego Barbosa		(substituted on) 46'
MF	11	(Mexico) Brayan Garnica
MF	18	(Mexico) Jeremy Márquez
MF	19	(Mexico) Edyairth Ortega
MF	32	(Uruguay) Lucas Rodríguez
FW	22	(Argentina) Franco Troyansky
FW	28	(Mexico) Christopher Trejo
FW	199	(Mexico) Jonathan Herrera
Manager:
(Argentina) Diego Cocca

Assistant referees:
José Ibrahim Martínez (Mexico City)
Enrique Isaac Bustos (Guerrero)
Fourth official:
Fernando Guerrero (Mexico City)
Video assistant referee:
Adonai Escobedo González (Aguascalientes)
Assistant video assistant referee:
Guillermo Pacheco Larios (Sonora)

==== Statistics ====
Statistic	Pachuca	Atlas
Goals scored	2	1
Total shots	21	11
Shots on target	6	2
Saves	0	4
Ball possession	66%	34%
Corner kicks	2	1
Fouls committed	16	8
Offsides	3	3
Yellow cards	4	3
Red cards	0	1

== Statistics ==
=== Goalscorers ===
There were 57 goals scored in 18 matches, for an average of 3.17 goals per match.

6 goals

- (Argentina) Nicolás Ibáñez (Pachuca)

3 goals

- ~~(France) André-Pierre Gignac (UANL)~~
- (Ecuador) Romario Ibarra (Pachuca)
- (Colombia) Julián Quiñones (Atlas)

2 goals

- (Venezuela) Fernando Aristeguieta (Puebla)
- (Mexico) Cristian Calderón (Guadalajara)
- (Argentina) Julio Furch (Atlas)
- (Mexico) José Juan Macías (Guadalajara)
- (Mexico) Jeremy Márquez (Atlas)
- (Mexico) Luis Reyes (Atlas)
- (Chile) Diego Valdés (América)

1 goal

- (Uruguay) Rodrigo Aguirre (Necaxa)
- (Mexico) Fernando Beltrán (Guadalajara)
- (Argentina) Germán Berterame (Atlético San Luis)
- (Uruguay) Gustavo Cabral (Pachuca)
- (Uruguay) Sebastián Cáceres (América)
- (Ecuador) Aníbal Chalá (Atlas)
- (Mexico) Ricardo Chávez (Atlético San Luis)
- (Mexico) Diego de Buen (Puebla)
- (Brazil) Diogo (UNAM)
- (Mexico) Jesús Dueñas (UANL)
- (Paraguay) Juan Escobar (Cruz Azul)
- (Uruguay) Abel Hernández (Atlético San Luis)
- (Netherlands) Vincent Janssen (Monterrey)
- ~~(Chile) Igor Lichnovsky (UANL)~~
- (Mexico) Henry Martín (América)
- (Venezuela) Jhon Murillo (Atlético San Luis)
- (Mexico) Israel Reyes (Puebla)
- (Mexico) Aldo Rocha (Atlas)
- (Mexico) Michell Rodríguez (Monterrey)
- (Mexico) Brian Rubio (Mazatlán)
- (Uruguay) Juan Manuel Sanabria (Atlético San Luis)
- (Mexico) Érick Sánchez (Pachuca)
- (Argentina) Juan Pablo Segovia (Puebla)
- (Uruguay) Christian Tabó (Cruz Azul)
- (Mexico) Alexis Vega (Guadalajara)
- (Mexico) Néstor Vidrio (Mazatlán)
- (Uruguay) Facundo Waller (Atlético San Luis)
- (Mexico) Alejandro Zendejas (América)

=== Assists ===
4 assists

- (Mexico) Víctor Guzmán (Pachuca)

2 assists

- (Colombia) Avilés Hurtado (Pachuca)
- (Chile) Diego Valdés (América)

1 assist

- (Mexico) José Abella (Atlas)
- (Mexico) Daniel Aceves (Pachuca)
- (Mexico) Érick Aguirre (Monterrey)
- (Mexico) Kevin Álvarez (Pachuca)
- (Mexico) Jesús Angulo (UANL)
- (Chile) Ángelo Araos (Necaxa)
- (Argentina) Germán Berterame (Atlético San Luis)
- (Ecuador) Aníbal Chalá (Atlas)
- (Spain) Álvaro Fidalgo (América)
- (Mexico) Sergio Flores (Guadalajara)
- (Argentina) Julio Furch (Atlas)
- (Venezuela) Jhon Murillo (Atlético San Luis)
- (Mexico) Fernando Navarro (Pachuca)
- (Mexico) Jesús Orozco (Guadalajara)
- (Mexico) Arturo Ortiz (UNAM)
- (Chile) Pablo Parra (Puebla)
- (Mexico) Pavel Pérez (Guadalajara)
- (Argentina) Guido Pizarro (UANL)
- (Colombia) Luis Quiñones (UANL)
- (Mexico) Luis Reyes (Atlas)
- (Mexico) Aldo Rocha (Atlas)
- (Argentina) Rubens Sambueza (Atlético San Luis)
- (Mexico) Alexis Vega (Guadalajara)
- (Uruguay) Facundo Waller (Atlético San Luis)
- (Mexico) Ángel Zaldívar (Guadalajara)
