= Apertura 2021 Liga MX final phase =

Tournament details
- Dates: 20 November – 12 December 2021
- Teams: 12

Tournament statistics
- Matches played: 18
- Goals scored: 43 (2.39 per match)
- Attendance: 527,242 (29,291 per match)

The Torneo Grita México Apertura 2021 (stylized as Grita... México A21) Liga MX final phase was being played between 20 November and 12 December 2021. A total of twelve teams competed in the final phase to decide the champions of the Apertura 2021 Liga MX season. For the third straight season, an additional qualifying round, the reclassification or repechaje, was employed, which expands the number of playoff spots to 12.

Both finalists qualified to the 2023 CONCACAF Champions League.

Atlas defeated León on penalty kicks to win their second title.

== Qualified teams ==
The following teams qualified for the championship stage.

In the following tables, the number of appearances, last appearance, and previous best result count only those in the short tournament era starting from Invierno 1996 (not counting those in the long tournament era from 1943–44 to 1995–96).

Qualified directly to quarter-finals (4 teams)
Seed	Team	Points (GD)	Date of qualification	Appearance	Last appearance	Previous best	Ref.
1	América	34	17 October 2021 (REC); 24 October 2021 (QF)	36th	Guardianes 2021	Champions (5 times)	
2	Atlas	29 (+11)	25 October 2021 (REC); 4 November 2021 (QF)	23rd	Guardianes 2021	Runners-up (Verano 1999)	
3	León	29 (+6)	3 November 2021 (REC); 6 November 2021 (QF)	14th	Guardianes 2021	Champions (3 times)	
4	UANL	28	30 October 2021 (REC); 6 November 2021 (QF)	28th	Guardianes 2021	Champions (5 times)	

Qualified to Reclassification round (8 teams)
Seed	Team	Points (GD)	Date of qualification	Appearance	Last appearance	Previous best	Ref.
5	Santos Laguna	24 (+7)	4 November 2021	33rd	Guardianes 2021	Champions (6 times)	
6	Toluca	24 (0, 22 GF)	31 October 2021	35th	Guardianes 2021	Champions (7 times)	
7	Puebla	24 (0, 16 GF)	5 November 2021	10th	Guardianes 2021	Semifinals (3 times)	
8	Cruz Azul	23	3 November 2021	31st	Guardianes 2021	Champions (2 times)	
9	Monterrey	22 (+3)	6 November 2021	26th	Guardianes 2021	Champions (4 times)	
10	Guadalajara	22 (0)	5 November 2021	28th	Guardianes 2021	Champions (3 times)	
11	UNAM	21	7 November 2021	24th	Guardianes 2020	Champions (4 times)	
12	Atlético San Luis	20	7 November 2021	1st	Debut	—	

== Format ==
=== Reclassification ===
- All rounds will be played in a single game hosted by the higher seed
- If a game ends in a draw, it will proceed directly to a penalty shoot-out.

=== Liguilla ===
- Teams will be re-seeded each round.
- The winners of the Reclassification matches will be seeded based on their ranking in the classification table.
- Team with more goals on aggregate after two matches will advance.
- No away goals rule is applied in neither round, if the two teams are tied on aggregate, the higher seeded team advances.
- In the final, if the two teams are tied after both legs, the match goes to extra time and, if necessary, a shoot-out.
- Both finalists will qualify to the 2023 CONCACAF Champions League.

== Reclassification ==
=== Summary ===
Matches took place on 20–21 November 2021.

Team 1	Score	Team 2
Santos Laguna	2–0	Atlético San Luis
Toluca	1–2	UNAM
Puebla	2–2 (6–5 p)	Guadalajara
Cruz Azul	1–4	Monterrey

=== Matches ===
20 November 2021
19:00 CST (UTC−6)

Santos Laguna	2–0	Atlético San Luis
Preciado 62'; Jeraldino 86' (pen.)	Report

Estadio Corona, Torreón
Attendance: 10,048
Referee: César Arturo Ramos (Sinaloa)

20 November 2021
21:00 CST (UTC−6)

Puebla	2–2	Guadalajara
Tabó 20' (pen.); Lucas Maia 89'	Report	Brizuela 6'; Mayorga 62'
Penalties
De Buen (penalty scored); Álvarez (penalty missed); Tabó (penalty scored); Villalpando (penalty scored); Escoto (penalty scored); Salas (penalty missed); Reyes (penalty scored); Lucas Maia (penalty scored)	6–5	(penalty scored) Antuna; (penalty missed) Cisneros; (penalty scored) Olivas; (penalty scored) Torres; (penalty scored) Calderón; (penalty missed) Huerta; (penalty scored) Briseño; (penalty missed) Mayorga

Estadio Cuauhtémoc, Puebla
Attendance: 34,530
Referee: Marco Antonio Ortiz (Durango)

21 November 2021
17:00 CST (UTC−6)

Toluca	1–2	UNAM
Ortega 62' (pen.)	Report	López 16'; Dinenno 50'

Estadio Nemesio Díez, Toluca
Attendance: 22,595
Referee: Fernando Hernández Gómez (Mexico City)

21 November 2021
19:15 CST (UTC−6)

Cruz Azul	1–4	Monterrey
Yotún 32' (pen.)	Report	Funes Mori 10' (pen.), 59'; Meza 27'; Janssen 85'

Estadio Azteca, Mexico City
Attendance: 0 (Note: One match attendance ban due to prohibited chants in the regular season match Cruz Azul vs. León.)
Referee: Fernando Guerrero (Mexico City)

== Seeding ==
The following is the final seeding for the final phase. The winners of the Reclassification matches are seeded based on their position in the classification table.

Seed	Team	Pld	W	D	L	GF	GA	GD	Pts
1	América	17	10	5	2	21	10	+11	35
2	Atlas	17	8	5	4	21	10	+11	29
3	León	17	8	5	4	20	14	+6	29
4	UANL	17	7	7	3	26	14	+12	28
5	Santos Laguna	17	5	9	3	23	16	+7	24
6	Puebla	17	6	6	5	16	16	0	24
7	Monterrey	17	5	7	5	19	16	+3	22
8	UNAM	17	5	6	6	17	23	−6	21

Source: Liga MX
Rules for classification: 1) Points; 2) Goal difference; 3) Goals scored; 4) Away goals scored; 5) Drawing of lots.

== Bracket ==
Quarter-finals
2	Atlas (s)	0	1	1
7	Monterrey	0	1	1
1	América	0	1	1
8	UNAM	0	3	3
3	León	1	2	3
6	Puebla	2	0	2
4	UANL (s)	1	1	2
5	Santos Laguna	2	0	2

Semi-finals
2	Atlas (s)	1	0	1
8	UNAM	0	1	1
3	León (s)	1	2	3
4	UANL	2	1	3

Finals
2	Atlas (p)	2	1	3 (4)
3	León	3	0	3 (3)

== Quarter-finals ==
The first legs were played on 24–25 November, and the second legs were played on 27–28 November.

Team 1	Agg.	Team 2	1st leg	2nd leg
UNAM	3–1	América	0–0	3–1
Monterrey	1–1 (s)	Atlas	0–0	1–1
Puebla	2–3	León	2–1	0–2
Santos Laguna	2–2 (s)	UANL	2–1	0–1

=== First leg ===
24 November 2021
19:00 CST (UTC−6)

UNAM	0–0	América
	Report

Estadio Olímpico Universitario, Mexico City
Attendance: 42,784
Referee: Jorge Antonio Pérez (Veracruz)

24 November 2021
21:05 CST (UTC−6)

Monterrey	0–0	Atlas
	Report

Estadio BBVA, Guadalupe
Attendance: 27,105
Referee: Jorge Isaac Rojas (Mexico City)

25 November 2021
19:00 CST (UTC−6)

Puebla	2–1	León
Parra 30'; Araujo 79'	Report	Barreiro 28'

Estadio Cuauhtémoc, Puebla
Attendance: 27,259
Referee: Erick Yair Miranda (Guanajuato)

25 November 2021
21:05 CST (UTC−6)

Santos Laguna	2–1	UANL
Valdés 4'; Aguirre 12'	Report	Gignac 74'

Estadio Corona, Torreón
Attendance: 15,310
Referee: Oscar Macías Romo (Aguascalientes)

=== Second leg ===
27 November 2021
19:00 CST (UTC−6)

América	1–3	UNAM
Aguilera 11' (pen.)	Report	Corozo 29', 42'; Higor 82'

Estadio Azteca, Mexico City
Attendance: 51,302
Referee: Marco Antonio Ortiz (Durango)

UNAM won 3–1 on aggregate.

27 November 2021
21:05 CST (UTC−6)

Atlas	1–1	Monterrey
Furch 18' (pen.)	Report	González 73'

Estadio Jalisco, Guadalajara
Attendance: 21,210
Referee: César Arturo Ramos (Sinaloa)

1–1 on aggregate. Atlas advanced due to being the higher seed in the classification table.

28 November 2021
18:00 CST (UTC−6)

UANL	1–0	Santos Laguna
Salcedo 82'	Report

Estadio Universitario, San Nicolás de los Garza
Attendance: 37,438
Referee: Luis Enrique Santander (Guanajuato)

2–2 on aggregate. UANL advanced due to being the higher seed in the classification table.

28 November 2021
20:05 CST (UTC−6)

León	2–0	Puebla
Mena 25', 80' (pen.)	Report

Estadio León, León
Attendance: 13,307
Referee: Jorge Antonio Pérez (Veracruz)

León won 3–2 on aggregate.

== Semi-finals ==
The first legs were played on 1–2 December, and the second legs were played on 4–5 December.

Team 1	Agg.	Team 2	1st leg	2nd leg
UNAM	1–1 (s)	Atlas	0–1	1–0
UANL	3–3 (s)	León	2–1	1–2

=== First leg ===
1 December 2021
21:00 CST (UTC−6)

UANL	2–1	León
Thauvin 90'; González 90+5'	Report	Meneses 57'

Estadio Universitario, San Nicolás de los Garza
Attendance: 37,785
Referee: Marco Antonio Ortiz (Durango)

2 December 2021
21:00 CST (UTC−6)

UNAM	0–1	Atlas
	Report	Furch 43'

Estadio Olímpico Universitario, Mexico City
Attendance: 48,976
Referee: Jorge Isaac Rojas (Mexico City)

=== Second leg ===
4 December 2021
21:00 CST (UTC−6)

León	2–1	UANL
Mena 8', 85'	Report	Reyes 16'

Estadio León, León
Attendance: 23,570
Referee: César Arturo Ramos (Sinaloa)

3–3 on aggregate. León advanced due to being the higher seed in the classification table.

5 December 2021
19:00 CST (UTC−6)

Atlas	0–1	UNAM
	Report	Dinenno 76'

Estadio Jalisco, Guadalajara
Attendance: 42,962
Referee: Jorge Antonio Pérez (Veracruz)

1–1 on aggregate. Atlas advanced due to being the higher seed in the classification table.

== Finals ==
The first leg was played on 9 December, and the second leg was played on 12 December.

Team 1	Agg.	Team 2	1st leg	2nd leg
León	3–3 (3–4 p)	Atlas	3–2	0–1 (a.e.t.)

=== First leg ===
9 December 2021
21:00 CST (UTC−6)

León	3–2	Atlas
Dávila 32'; Mena 78', 86' (pen.)	Report	Reyes 11'; Furch 65'

Estadio León, León
Attendance: 23,513
Referee: Luis Enrique Santander (Guanajuato)

==== Details ====
León	Atlas

GK	30	(Mexico) Rodolfo Cota (c)
DF	4	(Colombia) Andrés Mosquera		(substituted off) 35'
DF	21	(Colombia) Jaine Barreiro
DF	6	(Colombia) William Tesillo
DF	28	(Mexico) David Ramírez
MF	22	(Argentina) Santiago Colombatto		(substituted off) 69'
MF	8	(Mexico) José Iván Rodríguez
MF	25	(Colombia) Omar Fernández		(substituted off) 69'
MF	13	(Ecuador) Ángel Mena	(yellow card) 87'
MF	16	(Chile) Jean Meneses		(substituted off) 90'
FW	7	(Chile) Víctor Dávila	(yellow card) 81'	(substituted off) 90'
Substitutions:
GK	1	(Mexico) Alfonso Blanco
DF	3	(Mexico) Gil Burón
DF	5	(Mexico) Fernando Navarro
DF	23	(Argentina) Ramiro González		(substituted on) 35'
MF	10	(Mexico) Luis Montes		(substituted on) 69'
MF	11	(Mexico) Elías Hernández		(substituted on) 90'
MF	26	(Mexico) Fidel Ambríz		(substituted on) 90'
MF	32	(Mexico) Jesse Zamudio
FW	14	(Peru) Santiago Ormeño
FW	20	(Argentina) Emmanuel Gigliotti		(substituted on) 69'
Manager:
(Argentina) Ariel Holan

GK	12	(Colombia) Camilo Vargas
DF	5	(Peru) Anderson Santamaría
DF	2	(Argentina) Hugo Nervo
DF	27	(Mexico) Jesús Angulo
DF	15	(Mexico) Diego Barbosa	(yellow card) 4'	(substituted off) 79'
DF	14	(Mexico) Luis Reyes		(substituted off) 75'
MF	20	(Mexico) Jairo Torres
MF	26	(Mexico) Aldo Rocha (c)	(yellow card) 68'
MF	18	(Mexico) Jeremy Márquez		(substituted off) 75'
FW	9	(Argentina) Julio Furch
FW	33	(Colombia) Julián Quiñones	(yellow card) 87'
Substitutions:
GK	1	(Mexico) José Hernández
DF	4	(Mexico) José Abella	(yellow card) 81'	(substituted on) 79'
DF	13	(Mexico) Gaddi Aguirre
DF	21	(Ecuador) Aníbal Chalá		(substituted on) 75'
MF	6	(Mexico) Édgar Zaldívar		(substituted on) 75'
MF	10	(Argentina) Gonzalo Maroni
MF	19	(Mexico) Edyairth Ortega
FW	22	(Argentina) Franco Troyansky
FW	28	(Mexico) Christopher Trejo
FW	199	(Mexico) Jonathan Herrera
Manager:
(Argentina) Diego Cocca

Assistant referees:
José Ibrahim Martínez (Guerrero)
Jorge Antonio Sánchez (Estado de México)
Fourth official:
Óscar Mejía García (Mexico City)
Video assistant referee:
Gerardo Martínez Bravo (Guanajuato)
Assistant video assistant referee:
Guillermo Pacheco Larios (Sonora)

==== Statistics ====
Statistic	León	Atlas
Goals scored	3	2
Total shots	12	8
Shots on target	5	3
Saves	1	2
Ball possession	69%	31%
Corner kicks	2	3
Fouls committed	18	16
Offsides	1	3
Yellow cards	1	4
Red cards	0	0

=== Second leg ===
12 December 2021
20:15 CST (UTC−6)

Atlas	1–0 (a.e.t.)	León
Rocha 55'	Report
Penalties
Angulo (penalty scored); Rocha (penalty missed); Zaldívar (penalty scored); Trejo (penalty scored); Furch (penalty scored)	4–3	(penalty scored) E. Hernández; (penalty missed) Navarro; (penalty scored) Mena; (penalty scored) Tesillo; (penalty missed) Montes

Estadio Jalisco, Guadalajara
Attendance: 47,548
Referee: Marco Antonio Ortiz (Durango)

3–3 on aggregate. Atlas won on 4–3 penalty kicks

==== Details ====
Atlas	León

GK	12	(Colombia) Camilo Vargas
DF	5	(Peru) Anderson Santamaría		(substituted off) 90+3'
DF	2	(Argentina) Hugo Nervo
DF	27	(Mexico) Jesús Angulo
DF	15	(Mexico) Diego Barbosa
DF	14	(Mexico) Luis Reyes	(yellow card) 99'	(substituted off) 111'
MF	20	(Mexico) Jairo Torres		(substituted off) 111'
MF	26	(Mexico) Aldo Rocha (c)	(yellow card) 99'
MF	18	(Mexico) Jeremy Márquez		(substituted off) 80'
FW	9	(Argentina) Julio Furch
FW	33	(Colombia) Julián Quiñones		(substituted off) 72'
Substitutions:
GK	1	(Mexico) José Hernández
DF	4	(Mexico) José Abella
DF	13	(Mexico) Gaddi Aguirre		(substituted on) 111'
DF	21	(Ecuador) Aníbal Chalá		(substituted on) 90+3'
MF	6	(Mexico) Édgar Zaldívar		(substituted on) 80'
MF	11	(Mexico) Brayan Garnica		(substituted on) 111'
MF	19	(Mexico) Edyairth Ortega
FW	22	(Argentina) Franco Troyansky
FW	28	(Mexico) Christopher Trejo		(substituted on) 72'
FW	199	(Mexico) Jonathan Herrera
Manager:
(Argentina) Diego Cocca

GK	30	(Mexico) Rodolfo Cota (c)
DF	23	(Argentina) Ramiro González		(substituted off) 76'
DF	21	(Colombia) Jaine Barreiro
DF	6	(Colombia) William Tesillo
DF	28	(Mexico) David Ramírez
MF	22	(Argentina) Santiago Colombatto		(substituted off) 64'
MF	8	(Mexico) José Iván Rodríguez		(substituted off) 105'
MF	25	(Colombia) Omar Fernández		(substituted off) 64'
MF	13	(Ecuador) Ángel Mena
MF	16	(Chile) Jean Meneses	(red card) 90+1'	(substituted off) 86'
FW	7	(Chile) Víctor Dávila		(substituted off) 105'
Substitutions:
GK	1	(Mexico) Alfonso Blanco
DF	3	(Mexico) Gil Burón
DF	5	(Mexico) Fernando Navarro		(substituted on) 105'
DF	24	(Mexico) Osvaldo Rodríguez		(substituted on) 76'
DF	33	(Mexico) Pedro Hernández
MF	10	(Mexico) Luis Montes		(substituted on) 64'
MF	11	(Mexico) Elías Hernández		(substituted on) 85'
MF	26	(Mexico) Fidel Ambríz
FW	14	(Peru) Santiago Ormeño		(substituted on) 105'
FW	20	(Argentina) Emmanuel Gigliotti	(yellow card) 85' (yellow-red card) 90+4'	(substituted on) 64'
Manager:
(Argentina) Ariel Holan

Assistant referees:
Christian Espinosa Zavala (Mexico City)
Michel Alejandro Morales (Mexico City)
Fourth official:
Jorge Antonio Pérez (Veracruz)
Video assistant referee:
Erick Yair Miranda (Guanajuato)
Assistant video assistant referee:
Eduardo Galvan Basulto (Mexico City)

==== Statistics ====
Statistic	Atlas	León
Goals scored	1	0
Total shots	20	11
Shots on target	9	2
Saves	2	8
Ball possession	52%	48%
Corner kicks	5	6
Fouls committed	24	18
Offsides	0	1
Yellow cards	2	2
Red cards	0	2

== Statistics ==
=== Goalscorers ===
There were 43 goals scored in 18 matches, for an average of 2.39 goals per match.

6 goals

- (Ecuador) Ángel Mena (León)

3 goals

- (Argentina) Julio Furch (Atlas)

2 goals

- (Ecuador) Washington Corozo (UNAM)
- (Argentina) Juan Ignacio Dinenno (UNAM)
- (Mexico) Rogelio Funes Mori (Monterrey)

1 goal

- (Argentina) Emanuel Aguilera (América)
- (Mexico) Eduardo Aguirre (Santos Laguna)
- (Uruguay) Maximiliano Araújo (Puebla)
- (Colombia) Jaine Barreiro (León)
- (Mexico) Isaác Brizuela (Guadalajara)
- (Chile) Víctor Dávila (León)
- (France) André-Pierre Gignac (UANL)
- (Mexico) Alfonso González (Monterrey)
- (Paraguay) Carlos González (UANL)
- (Netherlands) Vincent Janssen (Monterrey)
- (Chile) Ignacio Jeraldino (Santos Laguna)
- (Mexico) Leonel López (UNAM)
- (Brazil) Lucas Maia (Puebla)
- (Mexico) Alejandro Mayorga (Guadalajara)
- (Chile) Jean Meneses (León)
- (Brazil) Higor Meritão (UNAM)
- (Argentina) Maximiliano Meza (Monterrey)
- (Mexico) Haret Ortega (Toluca)
- (Chile) Pablo Parra (Puebla)
- (Ecuador) Ayrton Preciado (Santos Laguna)
- (Mexico) Diego Reyes (UANL)
- (Mexico) Luis Reyes (Atlas)
- (Mexico) Aldo Rocha (Atlas)
- (Mexico) Carlos Salcedo (UANL)
- (Uruguay) Christian Tabó (Puebla)
- (France) Florian Thauvin (UANL)
- (Chile) Diego Valdés (Santos Laguna)
- (Peru) Yoshimar Yotún (Cruz Azul)

=== Assists ===
3 assists

- (Mexico) Alan Mozo (UNAM)

2 assists

- (Brazil) Gustavo Ferrareis (Puebla)
- (France) André-Pierre Gignac (UANL)
- (Paraguay) Carlos González (UANL)
- (Chile) Jean Meneses (León)

1 assist

- (Mexico) Eduardo Aguirre (Santos Laguna)
- (Mexico) Érick Aguirre (Monterrey)
- (Uruguay) Maximiliano Araújo (Puebla)
- (Mexico) Isaác Brizuela (Guadalajara)
- (Mexico) Omar Campos (Santos Laguna)
- (Argentina) Santiago Colombatto (León)
- (Chile) Víctor Dávila (León)
- (Argentina) Nicolás Freire (UNAM)
- (Mexico) Alfonso González (Monterrey)
- (Mexico) Jeremy Márquez (Atlas)
- (Ecuador) Ángel Mena (León)
- (Argentina) Maximiliano Meza (Monterrey)
- (Colombia) Julián Quiñones (Atlas)
- (Chile) Diego Valdés (Santos Laguna)
