= List of Mazatlán F.C. seasons =

Mazatlán F.C. is a football club based in Mazatlán, that competes in Liga MX.

The club was formed in 2020 after the sale and relocation of Monarcas Morelia.

== Key ==
Key to league:

- Pos. = Final position
- Pl. = Played
- W = Games won
- D = Games drawn
- L = Games lost
- GF = Goals scored
- GA = Goals against
- Pts = Points

Key to rounds:

- C = Champion
- F = Final (Runner-up)
- SF = Semi-finals
- QF = Quarter-finals
- R16/R32 = Round of 16, round of 32, etc.
- RE = Playoff round for liguilla
- GS = Group stage
- W/O = Withdrawn from competition

Champions	Runners-up

Top scorers shown in italics with number of goals scored in bold are players who were also top scorers in the Liga MX that season.

== Seasons ==
Season	League									Liguilla	Copa MX	International		Other competitions		League Top scorer (Note: Only includes goals scored in the regular season of Liga MX.)	
Season	Division	Pos. (Note: Position listed is general league rank.)	Pl.	W	D	L	GF	GA	Pts	Liguilla	Copa MX	International		Other competitions		Name(s)	Goals
2020 Guardianes	Liga MX	14th	17	4	4	9	24	31	16		Not held			Copa por México	GS	(Brazil) Camilo Sanvezzo	8
2021 Guardianes	Liga MX	13th	17	6	3	8	19	26	21		Not held					(Brazil) Camilo Sanvezzo	5
2021 Apertura	Liga MX	13th	17	5	5	7	18	24	23		Not held					(Brazil) Camilo Sanvezzo	8
2022 Clausura	Liga MX	12th	17	6	3	8	20	24	21	RE	Not held					(Argentina) Gonzalo Sosa	4
2022 Apertura	Liga MX	13th	17	3	8	6	17	24	17		Not held			Copa por México	GS	(Venezuela) Eduard Bello (Colombia) Nicolás Benedetti	3
2023 Clausura	Liga MX	18th	17	2	1	14	19	41	7		Not held			Copa por México	GS	(Colombia) Nicolás Benedetti	4
2023 Apertura	Liga MX	TBD									Not held	Leagues Cup	TBD				
