= Anderson Santamaría =

Peruvian footballer (born 1992)

Personal information
- Full name: Anderson Santamaría Bardales
- Date of birth: 10 January 1992 (age 34)
- Place of birth: Tingo María, Peru
- Height: 1.86 m (6 ft 1 in)
- Position: Centre-back

Team information
- Current team: Universitario de Deportes
- Number: 4

Youth career
- Deportivo Municipal

Senior career*
Years	Team	Apps	(Gls)
2010–2012	Ayacucho	57	(2)
2013–2015	León de Huánuco	74	(13)
2016–2017	Melgar	66	(3)
2018	Puebla	17	(0)
2019–2024	Atlas	131	(4)
2024–2025	Santos Laguna	23	(1)
2025–	Universitario de Deportes	24	(2)

International career^{‡}
2017–2024	Peru	34	(0)
Medal record
Men's football
Representing Peru
Copa América
Runner-up	2019 Brazil
- * Club domestic league appearances and goals as of 23:37, 18 July 2025 (UTC) ‡ National team caps and goals as of 22:43, 10 September 2024 (UTC)

Anderson Santamaría Bardales (born 10 January 1992) is a Peruvian professional footballer who plays as a Centre-back for club Universitario de Deportes and the Peru national team.

== Club career ==
Santamaría made his debut for Ayacucho in the later stages of the 2010 season, in a 2–0 win against José Gálvez. On 2 January 2013, he joined León de Huánuco signing a two-year contract. On 5 January 2015, he renewed his contract signing a one-year extension. In December 2015, he joined the 2015 Primera División champion, Melgar. On 20 December 2017, he announced that he was leaving Melgar and joining Liga MX club Puebla, for a $500K fee.

Santamaría joined Liga MX side Puebla on 20 December 2017. He made his debut on 17 January 2018 in a 3–1 win against Cruz Azul in Copa MX, where he had multiple defensive interventions that garnered the fans' plaudits. On 12 December 2018, he joined Atlas on loan. Later in the year, on 18 July, he permanently joined the Guadalajara club. On 12 November 2021 he renewed his contract until 2025. A month later, on 13 December, he helped Atlas win the Apertura 2021, their first title in over 70 years, be beating León 4–3 on penalties after a 3–3 draw. On 30 May 2022, he helped Altas win Clausura 2022.

== International career ==
In May 2018, he was named in Peru's provisional 24 man squad for the 2018 FIFA World Cup in Russia.

== Career statistics ==
=== Club ===
As of 18 July 2025

Appearances and goals by club, season and competition
Club	Season	League			National Cup		Continental		Other		Total	
Club	Season	Division	Apps	Goals	Apps	Goals	Apps	Goals	Apps	Goals	Apps	Goals
Ayacucho	2010	Peruvian Primera División	5	0	0	0	—		—		5	0
Ayacucho	2011	Peruvian Primera División	21	0	0	0	—		—		21	0
Ayacucho	2012	Peruvian Primera División	31	2	0	0	2 (Note: Appearances in Copa Sudamericana)	0	—		33	2
Ayacucho	Total		57	2	0	0	2	0	0	0	59	2
León de Huánuco	2013	Peruvian Primera División	23	0	0	0	—		—		23	0
León de Huánuco	2014	Peruvian Primera División	24	2	11	2	—		—		35	4
León de Huánuco	2015	Peruvian Primera División	27	11	8	2	2	0	—		37	13
León de Huánuco	Total		74	13	19	4	2	0	0	0	95	17
Melgar	2016	Peruvian Primera División	36	2	0	0	4 (Note: Appearances in Copa Libertadores)	0	—		40	2
Melgar	2017	Peruvian Primera División	30	1	0	0	4	0	—		34	1
Melgar	Total		66	3	0	0	8	0	0	0	74	3
Puebla	2017–18	Liga MX	11	0	2	0	—		—		13	0
Puebla	2018–19	Liga MX	6	0	1	0	—		—		7	0
Puebla	Total		17	0	3	0	0	0	0	0	20	0
Atlas	2018–19	Liga MX	15	2	2	0	—		—		17	2
Atlas	2019–20	Liga MX	9	0	2	0	—		—		11	0
Atlas	2020–21	Liga MX	20	1	0	0	—		—		20	1
Atlas	2021–22	Liga MX	42	1	0	0	—		1 (Note: Appearance in Campeón de Campeones)	0	43	1
Atlas	2022–23	Liga MX	26	0	0	0	4 (Note: Appearances in Campeones Cup and CONCACAF Champions Cup)	0	—		30	0
Atlas	2023–24	Liga MX	19	0	0	0	3 (Note: Appearances in Leagues Cup)	0	—		22	0
Atlas	Total		131	4	4	0	7	0	1	0	143	4
Santos Laguna	2024–25	Liga MX	23	1	0	0	—		2	0	25	1
Universitario	2025	Peruvian Primera División	1	0	0	0	—		—		1	0
Career total			369	23	26	4	19	0	3	0	417	27

=== International ===
As of 10 September 2024

Peru
Year	Apps	Goals
2017	2	0
2018	10	0
2019	5	0
2020	1	0
2021	6	0
2022	1	0
2023	5	0
2024	4	0
Total	34	0

== Honours ==
Atlas

- Liga MX: Apertura 2021, Clausura 2022
- Campeón de Campeones: 2022

Universitario de Deportes

- Peruvian Primera División: 2025

Individual

- Liga MX Best XI: Apertura 2021
