= Arturo Palma =

Mexican footballer (born 2002)

Personal information
- Full name: Arturo Adolfo Palma Cisneros
- Date of birth: 16 January 2002 (age 24)
- Place of birth: Iztapalapa, Mexico City, Mexico
- Height: 1.76 m (5 ft 9 in)
- Position: Attacking midfielder

Team information
- Current team: Lugo
- Number: 16

Youth career
- 2018: Pato Baeza
- 2021: Querétaro
- 2021–2022: Necaxa

Senior career*
Years	Team	Apps	(Gls)
2021	Querétaro	5	(0)
2021–2025	Necaxa	18	(1)
2023–2024	→ Tapatío (loan)	41	(3)
2025–2026	Atlético Morelia	27	(0)
2026–	Lugo	0	(0)
- * Club domestic league appearances and goals as of 1 August 2026

Arturo Adolfo Palma Cisneros (born 16 January 2002) is a Mexican professional footballer who plays as an attacking midfielder for Spanish Primera Federación club Lugo.

== Club career ==
On 24 July 2026, Palma signed with Lugo as a free agent.

== Career statistics ==
=== Club ===
As of 1 August 2026

Club	Season	League			Cup		Continental		Other		Total	
Club	Season	Division	Apps	Goals	Apps	Goals	Apps	Goals	Apps	Goals	Apps	Goals
Querétaro	2020–21	Liga MX	5	0	—		—		—		5	0
Necaxa	2021–22	Liga MX	4	0	—		—		—		4	0
Necaxa	2024–25	Liga MX	14	1	—		—		—		14	1
Necaxa	Total		18	1	—		—		—		18	1
Tapatío	2023–24	Liga de Expansión MX	30	3	—		—		—		30	3
Tapatío	2024–25	Liga de Expansión MX	11	0	—		—		—		11	0
Tapatío	Total		41	3	—		—		—		41	3
Tapatío	2025–26	Liga de Expansión MX	27	0	—		—		—		27	0
Career total			91	4	0	0	0	0	0	0	91	4
