= Jesús Hernández (footballer, born August 2001) =

Mexican footballer (born 2001)

Personal information
- Full name: Jesús Daniel Hernández Casiano
- Date of birth: 1 August 2001 (age 25)
- Place of birth: Florencio Villarreal, Guerrero, Mexico
- Height: 1.70 m (5 ft 7 in)
- Position: Attacking midfielder

Team information
- Current team: Tlaxcala (on loan from Pachuca)
- Number: 28

Youth career
- 2018–2021: Pachuca

Senior career*
Years	Team	Apps	(Gls)
2021–	Pachuca	49	(3)
2024–2025	→ León (loan)	4	(0)
2025–2026	→ Mazatlán (loan)	21	(1)
2026–	→ Tlaxcala (loan)	5	(0)
- * Club domestic league appearances and goals as of 28 August 2026

Jesús Daniel Hernández Casiano (born 1 August 2001), commonly known as "Primo Hernández", is a Mexican professional footballer who plays as an attacking midfielder for Liga de Expansión MX club Tlaxcala on loan from Pachuca.

== Career statistics ==
=== Club ===
As of 28 August 2026

Club	Season	League			Cup		Continental		Other		Total	
Club	Season	Division	Apps	Goals	Apps	Goals	Apps	Goals	Apps	Goals	Apps	Goals
Pachuca	2021–22	Liga MX	8	0	—		—		—		8	0
Pachuca	2022–23	Liga MX	21	1	—		—		1 (Note: Appearance in Campeón de Campeones)	0	22	1
Pachuca	2023–24	Liga MX	20	2	—		2 (Note: Appearances in CONCACAF Champions Cup)	0	1 (Note: Appearance in Leagues Cup)	0	23	2
Pachuca	Total		49	3	—		2	0	2	0	53	3
León (loan)	2024–25	Liga MX	4	0	—		—		1	0	5	0
Mazatlán (loan)	2025–26	Liga MX	21	1	—		—		3	0	24	1
Tlaxcala (loan)	2026–27	Liga de Expansión MX	5	0	—		—		—		5	0
Career total			79	4	0	0	2	0	6	0	87	4

== Honours ==
Pachuca

- Liga MX: Apertura 2022
- CONCACAF Champions Cup: 2024
