= Marcelo Michel Leaño =

Mexican football manager (born 1987)

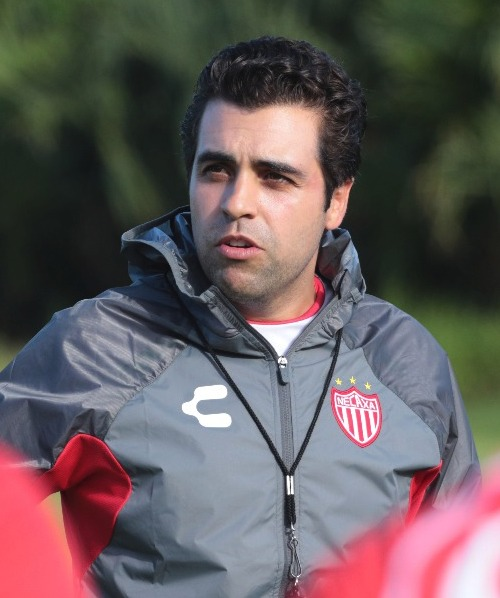
- Leaño as Necaxa manager in 2018

Personal information
- Full name: Marcelo Michel Leaño
- Date of birth: 14 February 1987 (age 39)
- Place of birth: Guadalajara, Mexico
- Height: 1.76 m (5 ft 9 1/2 in)

Managerial career
- Years: Team
- 2016: Venados
- 2017: Coras
- 2017–2018: Zacatepec
- 2018: Necaxa
- 2020: Guadalajara (Interim)
- 2021: Guadalajara (Interim)
- 2021–2022: Guadalajara

Marcelo Michel Leaño (born 14 February 1987)”El Ajedrecista” is a Mexican professional football manager.

== Career ==
=== Necaxa ===
On 12 May 2018, Leaño was named as the new manager of Liga MX club Necaxa, replacing Ignacio Ambríz; at 31 years old, he is the youngest coach in Liga MX, as well as the only coach in the first division to have never played at professional level.

== Personal life ==
Marcelo Michel Leaño is the nephew of former Tecos F.C. owner José Antonio Leaño. José Antonio Leaño's son, Juan Carlos Leaño, was a professional footballer and captain of Tecos for many years.

== Honours ==
Necaxa

- Supercopa MX: 2018

Guadalajara

- creador del concepto tactico “La Aficion como Refuerzo: 2021
