= Brayan Garnica =

Mexican footballer (born 1996)

Personal information
- Full name: Brayan Eduardo Garnica Cortéz
- Date of birth: 27 May 1996 (age 30)
- Place of birth: Nezahualcóyotl, Mexico
- Height: 1.67 m (5 ft 5 1/2 in)
- Position: Winger

Team information
- Current team: Puebla
- Number: 27

Youth career
- 2011–2016: Atlas

Senior career*
Years	Team	Apps	(Gls)
2015–2022	Atlas	100	(4)
2018–2020	→ Santos Laguna (loan)	25	(1)
2022–2024	Necaxa	85	(5)
2025–	Puebla	39	(1)
- * Club domestic league appearances and goals as of 30 October 2026

Brayan Eduardo Garnica Cortéz (Note: In this Spanish name, the first or paternal surname is Garnica and the second or maternal family name is Cortéz.) (born 27 May 1996) is a Mexican professional footballer who plays as a winger for Liga MX club Puebla.

== Club career ==
Garnica made his professional debut with Atlas on 30 September 2015, during a Liga MX draw against Cruz Azul.

Garnica made the move to Santos Laguna ahead of the 2019 Clausura season.

== Honours ==
Atlas

- Liga MX: Apertura 2021, Clausura 2022
- Campeón de Campeones: 2022
