= Christopher Trejo =

Mexican footballer (born 1999)

Personal information
- Full name: Christopher Brayan Trejo Morantes
- Date of birth: 2 December 1999 (age 26)
- Place of birth: Guadalupe, Nuevo León, Mexico
- Height: 1.78 m (5 ft 10 in)
- Position: Forward

Team information
- Current team: Cancún
- Number: 11

Youth career
- 2017–2020: Atlas

Senior career*
Years	Team	Apps	(Gls)
2018–2025	Atlas	119	(5)
2024–2025	→ Atlético Morelia (loan)	30	(10)
2025–	Cancún	41	(22)
- * Club domestic league appearances and goals as of 21 September 2026

Christopher Brayan Trejo Morantes (born 2 December 1999) is a Mexican professional footballer who plays as a forward for Liga de Expansión MX club Cancún.

== Career statistics ==
=== Club ===
As of match played 9 March 2024

Club	Season	League			Cup		Continental		Other		Total	
Club	Season	Division	Apps	Goals	Apps	Goals	Apps	Goals	Apps	Goals	Apps	Goals
Atlas	2017–18	Liga MX	—		1	0	—		—		1	0
Atlas	2018–19	Liga MX	4	0	3	1	—		—		7	1
Atlas	2019–20	Liga MX	18	1	6	1	—		—		24	2
Atlas	2020–21	Liga MX	16	0	—		—		—		16	0
Atlas	2021–22	Liga MX	33	2	—		—		1 (Note: Appearance in Supercopa de la Liga MX)	0	34	2
Atlas	2022–23	Liga MX	30	2	—		3 (Note: Appearances in CONCACAF Champions League)	0	1 (Note: Appearance in Campeones Cup)	0	34	2
Atlas	2023–24	Liga MX	18	0	—		—		2 (Note: Appearances in Leagues Cup)	0	20	0
Atlas	Total		119	5	10	2	3	0	4	0	136	7
Career total			119	5	10	2	3	0	4	0	136	7

== Honours ==
Atlas

- Liga MX: Apertura 2021, Clausura 2022
- Campeón de Campeones: 2022
