= Édgar Zaldívar =

Mexican footballer (born 1996)

Personal information
- Full name: Édgar Zaldívar Valverde
- Date of birth: 17 October 1996 (age 30)
- Place of birth: San Luis Potosí, Mexico
- Height: 1.72 m (5 ft 8 in)
- Position: Defensive midfielder

Team information
- Current team: Atlas
- Number: 6

Youth career
- 2014–2018: Atlas

Senior career*
Years	Team	Apps	(Gls)
2016–	Atlas	203	(8)
- * Club domestic league appearances and goals as of 20 November 2026

Édgar Zaldívar Valverde (born 17 October 1996), also known as Gary, is a Mexican professional footballer who plays as a defensive midfielder for Liga MX club Atlas.

== Career statistics ==
=== Club ===
As of match played on 20 November 2026

Club	Season	League			Cup		Continental		Other		Total	
Club	Season	Division	Apps	Goals	Apps	Goals	Apps	Goals	Apps	Goals	Apps	Goals
Atlas	2015–16	Liga MX	—		1	0	—		—		1	0
Atlas	2016–17	Liga MX	6	0	4	0	—		—		10	0
Atlas	2017–18	Liga MX	6	0	7	0	—		—		13	0
Atlas	2018–19	Liga MX	14	1	2	0	—		—		16	1
Atlas	2019–20	Liga MX	18	0	4	2	—		—		22	2
Atlas	2020–21	Liga MX	14	2	3 (Note: Appearances in Copa GNP por México)	0	—		—		17	2
Atlas	2021–22	Liga MX	44	1	1 (Note: Appearance in Supercopa de la Liga MX)	0	—		—		45	1
Atlas	2022–23	Liga MX	31	0	—		2 (Note: Appearances in CONCACAF Champions League)	0	1 (Note: Appearance in Campeones Cup)	0	34	0
Atlas	2023–24	Liga MX	22	1	—		—		2 (Note: Appearances in Leagues Cup)	0	24	1
Atlas	2024–25	Liga MX	17	1	—		—		3	0	20	1
Atlas	2025–26	Liga MX	17	0	—		—		—		17	0
Atlas	2026–27	Liga MX	14	2	—		—		3	0	17	2
Career total			203	8	22	2	2	0	9	0	236	10

== Honours ==
Atlas

- Liga MX: Apertura 2021, Clausura 2022
- Campeón de Campeones: 2022
