= Edyairth Ortega =

Mexican footballer (born 1997)

Personal information
- Full name: Edyairth Alberto Ortega Alatorre
- Date of birth: 23 January 1997 (age 29)
- Place of birth: Guadalajara, Jalisco, Mexico
- Height: 1.76 m (5 ft 9 in)
- Position: Midfielder

Team information
- Current team: Tepatitlán
- Number: 20

Youth career
- 2012–2016: Atlas
- 2016–2017: Necaxa
- 2017–2019: Atlas

Senior career*
Years	Team	Apps	(Gls)
2018–2023	Atlas	36	(2)
2019–2020	→ Tampico Madero (loan)	22	(0)
2026–	Tepatitlán	5	(0)
- * Club domestic league appearances and goals as of 13 September 2026

Edyairth Alberto Ortega Alatorre (born 23 January 1997) is a Mexican professional footballer who plays as a midfielder for Liga de Expansión MX club Tepatitlán.

== Career statistics ==
=== Club ===
As of 13 September 2026

Club	Season	League			Cup		Continental		Other		Total	
Club	Season	Division	Apps	Goals	Apps	Goals	Apps	Goals	Apps	Goals	Apps	Goals
Atlas	2017–18	Liga MX	6	2	4	0	—		—		10	2
Atlas	2018–19	Liga MX	4	0	3	0	—		—		7	0
Atlas	2020–21	Liga MX	11	0	3 (Note: Appearances in Copa GNP por México)	0	—		—		14	0
Atlas	2021–22	Liga MX	7	0	—		—		—		7	0
Atlas	2022–23	Liga MX	8	0	—		—		1 (Note: Appearance in Leagues Cup)	0	9	0
Atlas	Total		36	2	10	0	—		1	0	47	2
Tampico Madero (loan)	2019–20	Ascenso MX	22	0	—		—		—		22	0
Tepatitlán (loan)	2026–27	Liga de Expansión MX	5	0	—		—		—		5	0
Career total			63	2	10	0	0	0	1	0	74	2

== Honours ==
Atlas

- Liga MX: Apertura 2021, Clausura 2022
- Campeón de Campeones: 2022
