= Aníbal Chalá =

Ecuadorian footballer (born 1996)

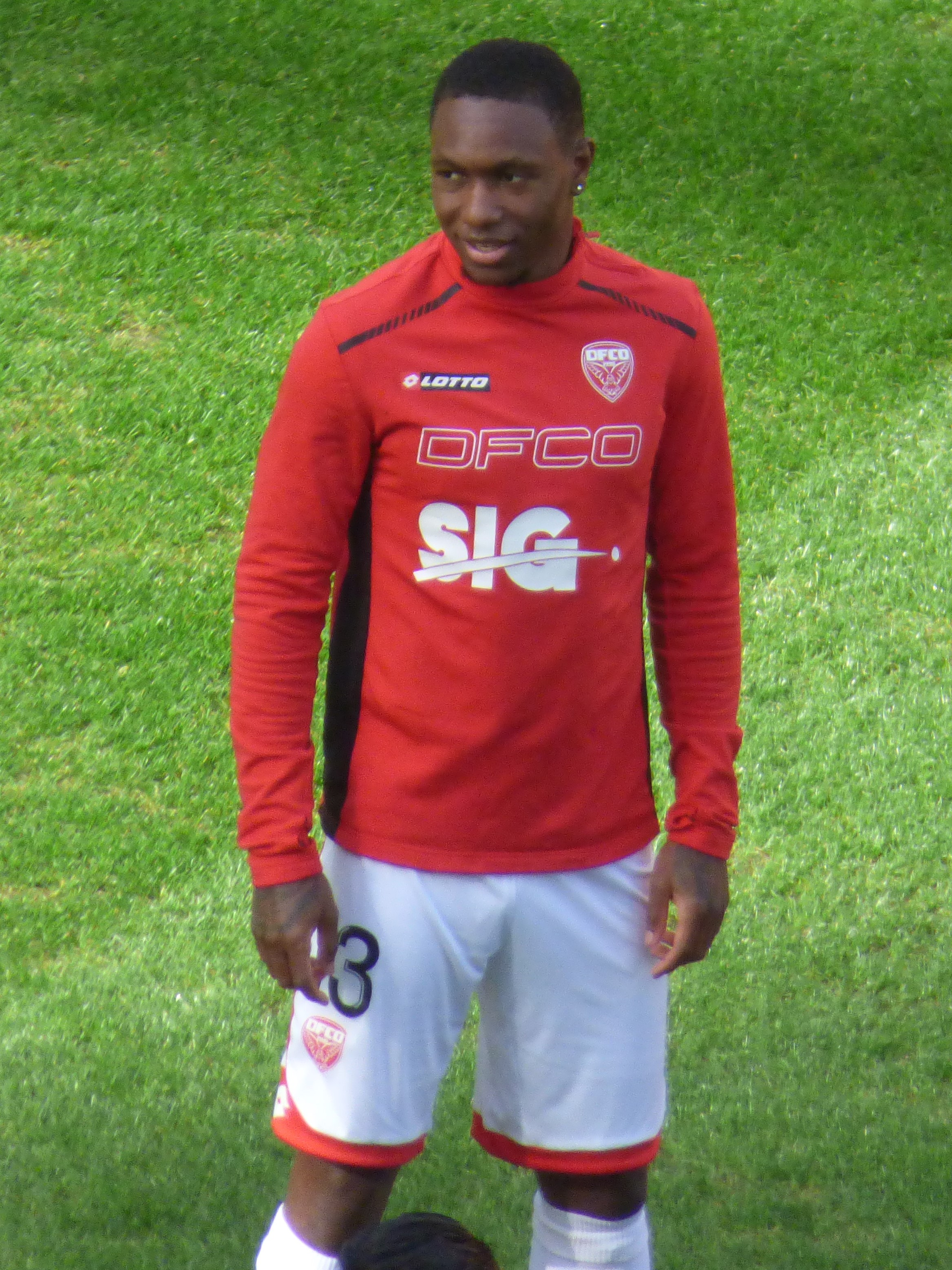
- Chalá with Dijon in February 2021

Personal information
- Full name: Aníbal Hernán Chalá Ayoví
- Date of birth: 9 May 1996 (age 30)
- Place of birth: Mira, Ecuador
- Height: 1.79 m (5 ft 10 in)
- Position: Left back

Team information
- Current team: Barcelona SC
- Number: 6

Youth career
- 2008–2013: El Nacional

Senior career*
Years	Team	Apps	(Gls)
2013–2016	El Nacional	119	(3)
2017–2018	FC Dallas	0	(0)
2017–2018	→ LDU Quito (loan)	32	(0)
2019	LDU Quito	6	(0)
2019–2021	Toluca	28	(0)
2020–2021	→ Dijon (loan)	13	(1)
2021–2023	Atlas	47	(1)
2023	Emelec	12	(2)
2024–	Barcelona SC	47	(2)
2026	→ Olimpia (loan)	7	(0)

International career^{‡}
2014–2015	Ecuador U20	6	(0)
2018–	Ecuador	3	(0)
- * Club domestic league appearances and goals as of 20 August 2025 ‡ National team caps and goals as of 21 March 2024

Aníbal Hernán Chalá Ayoví (born 9 May 1996) is an Ecuadorian professional footballer who plays as a left-back for Ecuadorian Serie A club Barcelona SC and the Ecuador national team.

== Club career ==
Chalá began his career with El Nacional in 2013, before joining Major League Soccer side FC Dallas on 14 December 2016. He was then loaned out to L.D.U. Quito until 31 December 2017.

On 6 June 2019, Deportivo Toluca announced that they had signed Chalá. He was loaned to French club Dijon for the 2020–21 season.

Chala played in Liga MX for Atlas FC from 2021 to 2023. In August 2023, Chala joined C.S. Emelec in the Ecuadorian Serie A.

== International career ==
Chalá made his international debut for the Ecuador national football team in a 4–3 defeat against Qatar on 12 October 2018 in Doha.

== Career statistics ==
=== Club ===
As of match played 1 December 2024

Appearances and goals by club, season and competition
Club	Season	League			National cup		Continental		Other		Total	
Club	Season	Division	Apps	Goals	Apps	Goals	Apps	Goals	Apps	Goals	Apps	Goals
El Nacional	2013	Ecuadorian Serie A	16	0	—		—		—		16	0
El Nacional	2014	Ecuadorian Serie A	31	1	—		—		—		31	1
El Nacional	2015	Ecuadorian Serie A	34	0	—		—		—		34	0
El Nacional	2016	Ecuadorian Serie A	37	2	—		—		—		37	2
El Nacional	Total		116	3	—		—		—		116	3
FC Dallas	2017	Major League Soccer	0	0	0	0	0	0	—		0	0
LDU Quito (loan)	2017	Ecuadorian Serie A	19	0	—		3	0	2	0	24	0
LDU Quito (loan)	2018	Ecuadorian Serie A	13	0	—		3	0	—		16	0
LDU Quito (loan)	Total		32	0	—		6	0	2	0	40	0
LDU Quito	2019	Ecuadorian Serie A	6	0	—		—		—		6	0
Toluca	2019–20	Liga MX	26	2	3	1	—		—		29	3
Toluca	2020–21	Liga MX	2	0	—		—		—		2	0
Toluca	Total		28	2	3	1	—		—		31	3
Dijon (loan)	2020–21	Ligue 1	13	0	1	0	—		—		14	0
Atlas	2021–22	Liga MX	25	0	—		—		—		25	0
Atlas	2022–23	Liga MX	22	1	—		1	0	1	0	24	1
Atlas	Total		47	1	—		1	0	1	0	49	1
Emelec	2023	Ecuadorian Serie A	12	2	—		—		—		12	2
Barcelona SC	2024	Ecuadorian Serie A	27	2	—		7	0	—		34	2
Career total			281	11	4	1	14	0	3	0	310	12

=== International ===
As of match played 21 March 2024

Appearances and goals by national team and year
National team	Year	Apps	Goals
Ecuador	2018	2	0
Ecuador	2024	1	0
Total		3	0

== Honours ==
LDU Quito

- Ecuadorian Serie A: 2018

Atlas

- Liga MX: Apertura 2021, Clausura 2022
- Campeón de Campeones: 2022
