= Aldo Rocha =

Mexican footballer (born 1992)

Personal information
- Full name: Aldo Paúl Rocha González
- Date of birth: 6 November 1992 (age 34)
- Place of birth: León, Guanajuato, Mexico
- Height: 1.68 m (5 ft 6 in)
- Position: Defensive midfielder

Team information
- Current team: Atlas
- Number: 26

Youth career
- 2008–2013: León
- 2009: Real Leonés

Senior career*
Years	Team	Apps	(Gls)
2013–2017	León	65	(2)
2017	→ Morelia (loan)	16	(0)
2017–2020	Morelia	84	(8)
2020	Mazatlán	15	(1)
2021–	Atlas	189	(17)
- * Club domestic league appearances and goals as of 20 November 2026

Aldo Paúl Rocha González (born 6 November 1992) is a Mexican professional footballer who plays as a defensive midfielder and captains for Liga MX club Atlas.

== International career ==
In mid April 2023, Rocha was included in the senior national team call-up by Diego Cocca for a friendly match against the United States, set to take place on April 19, 2023.

== Career statistics ==
As of match played on 20 November 2026

Appearances and goals by club, season and competition
Club	Season	League			Cup		Continental		Other		Total	
Club	Season	Division	Apps	Goals	Apps	Goals	Apps	Goals	Apps	Goals	Apps	Goals
León	2012–13	Liga MX	1	0	3	0	—		—		4	0
León	2013–14	Liga MX	14	0	6	1	2 (Note: Appearances in Copa Libertadores)	0	—		22	1
León	2014–15	Liga MX	9	0	—		4 (Note: Appearances in CONCACAF Champions League)	0	—		13	0
León	2015–16	Liga MX	33	2	6	0	—		—		39	2
León	2016–17	Liga MX	8	0	3	0	—		—		11	0
León	Total		65	2	18	1	6	0	—		89	3
Morelia (loan)	2016–17	Liga MX	16	0	2	0	—		—		18	0
Morelia	2017–18	Liga MX	21	0	2	0	—		—		23	0
Morelia	2018–19	Liga MX	32	0	5	0	—		—		37	0
Morelia	2019–20	Liga MX	31	8	4	2	—		—		35	10
Morelia	Total		84	8	11	2	—		—		95	10
Mazatlán	2020–21	Liga MX	15	1	3 (Note: Appearances in Copa GNP por México)	0	—		—		18	1
Atlas	2020–21	Liga MX	20	3	—		—		—		20	3
Atlas	2021–22	Liga MX	43	4	1 (Note: Appearance in Supercopa de la Liga MX)	0	—		—		44	4
Atlas	2022–23	Liga MX	25	1	4 (Note: Appearances in Copa Sky por México)	0	4	1	—		33	2
Atlas	2023–24	Liga MX	29	5	—		—		3 (Note: Appearances in Leagues Cup)	1	32	6
Atlas	2024–25	Liga MX	33	2	—		—		3	0	36	2
Atlas	2025–26	Liga MX	31	1	—		—		3	0	34	1
Atlas	2026–27	Liga MX	8	1	—		—		—		8	1
Atlas	Total		189	17	5	0	4	1	9	1	207	18
Career total			369	28	39	3	10	1	9	1	427	33

== Honours ==
León

- Liga MX: Apertura 2013, Clausura 2014

Atlas

- Liga MX: Apertura 2021, Clausura 2022
- Campeón de Campeones: 2022

Individual

- Liga MX Best XI: Apertura 2021, Clausura 2022
- Liga MX Best Defensive Midfielder: 2021–22
- Liga MX All-Star: 2022
