= Gaddi Aguirre =

Mexican footballer (born 1996)

Personal information
- Full name: Gaddi Axel Aguirre Ledezma
- Date of birth: 31 March 1996 (age 30)
- Place of birth: Guadalajara, Jalisco, Mexico
- Height: 1.81 m (5 ft 11 in)
- Position: Centre-back

Team information
- Current team: Atlas
- Number: 13

Youth career
- 2011–2016: Atlas

Senior career*
Years	Team	Apps	(Gls)
2016–	Atlas	155	(2)
2018–2020	→ Tampico Madero (loan)	40	(3)
- * Club domestic league appearances and goals as of 20 November 2026

Gaddi Axel Aguirre Ledezma (born 31 March 1996) is a Mexican professional footballer who plays as a centre-back for Liga MX club Atlas.

== Career statistics ==
=== Club ===
As of match played on 20 November 2026

Appearances and goals by club, season and competition
Club	Season	League			Cup		Continental		Other		Total	
Club	Season	Division	Apps	Goals	Apps	Goals	Apps	Goals	Apps	Goals	Apps	Goals
Atlas	2015–16	Liga MX	10	0	5	0	—		—		15	0
Atlas	2016–17	Liga MX	10	0	3	0	—		—		13	0
Atlas	2017–18	Liga MX	5	0	6	0	—		—		11	0
Atlas	2018–19	Liga MX	3	0	3	0	—		—		6	0
Atlas	2020–21	Liga MX	1	0	—		—		—		1	0
Atlas	2021–22	Liga MX	20	0	—		—		—		20	0
Atlas	2022–23	Liga MX	23	1	1 (Note: Appearance in Copa Sky por México)	0	3 (Note: Appearances in CONCACAF Champions League)	0	1 (Note: Appearance in Leagues Cup)	0	28	1
Atlas	2023–24	Liga MX	20	0	—		—		1	0	21	0
Atlas	2024–25	Liga MX	24	0	—		—		1	0	25	0
Atlas	2025–26	Liga MX	32	1	—		—		2	0	34	1
Atlas	2026–27	Liga MX	7	0	—		—		1	0	8	0
Atlas	Total		155	2	18	0	3	0	6	0	177	2
Tampico Madero (loan)	2018–19	Ascenso MX	10	1	—		—		—		10	1
Tampico Madero (loan)	2019–20	Ascenso MX	13	1	—		—		—		13	1
Tampico Madero (loan)	2020–21	Liga de Expansión MX	17	1	—		—		—		17	1
Tampico Madero (loan)	Total		40	3	—		—		—		40	3
Career total			195	5	18	0	3	0	6	0	222	5

== Honours ==
Tampico Madero

- Liga de Expansión MX: Guardianes 2020

Atlas

- Liga MX: Apertura 2021, Clausura 2022
- Campeón de Campeones: 2022
