= Ramiro González (footballer, born 1990) =

Argentine footballer

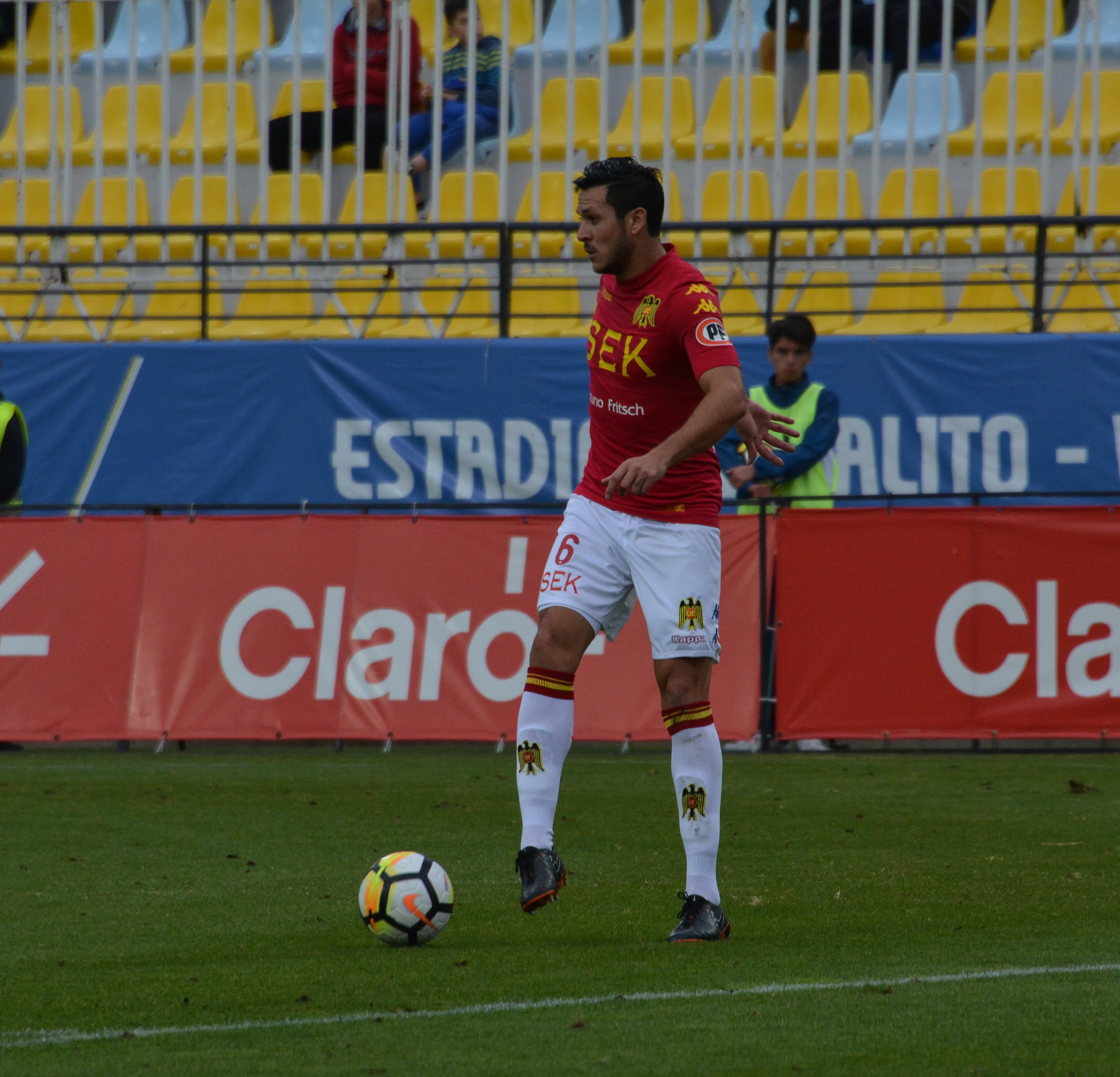
- González with Unión Española in 2018

Personal information
- Full name: Ramiro Gabriel González Hernández
- Date of birth: 21 November 1990 (age 35)
- Place of birth: Rosario, Argentina
- Height: 1.82 m (6 ft 0 in)
- Position: Defender

Team information
- Current team: Everton

Youth career
- Boca Juniors
- Atlético Rafaela

Senior career*
Years	Team	Apps	(Gls)
2011–2013	Atlético Rafaela	?	(?)
2013–2014	Alvarado	16	(1)
2014–2015	Unión Aconquija	45	(5)
2016–2018	Juventud Unida	14	(1)
2016–2017	→ Instituto (loan)	27	(2)
2017–2018	→ Unión Española (loan)	41	(5)
2019–2021	León	37	(0)
2020–2021	→ Atlético San Luis (loan)	31	(5)
2022	Talleres	8	(0)
2022	Platense	7	(0)
2023–2024	Colo-Colo	28	(1)
2025–	Everton	0	(0)
- * Club domestic league appearances and goals as of 4 January 2025

Ramiro Gabriel González Hernández (born 21 November 1990) is an Argentine-Chilean professional footballer who plays as a defender for Everton de Viña del Mar.

== Career ==
González made his youth career in both Boca Juniors and Atlético Rafaela. Later, he played for clubs in minor categories of Argentine football until he joined on loan from Juventud Unida to Unión Española at the Chilean Primera División on 2017 season.

In 2019, González joined Liga MX club León on a free transfer reaching the 2019 Clausura's final and playing at the 2020 CONCACAF Champions League. In June 2020, he was loaned to Atlético San Luis. He left León at the end of 2021.

In January 2022, González returned to Argentina, signing a deal with Talleres de Córdoba until the end of 2023. He ended his contract with Talleres to join Colo-Colo in June 2022, but it didn't take place due to an injury detected by the doctors. So, he joined Platense.

In 2023, González signed with Chilean club Colo-Colo. In 2025, he switched to Everton de Viña del Mar.

== Personal life ==
Due to his grandparents are Chileans, he acquired the Chilean nationality by descent according to Chilean law - keeping the Argentine nationality - when joined Unión Española on 2017. So, he didn't hold a foreign place in the Chilean football.

== Honours ==
León

- Leagues Cup: 2021
