= Franco Troyansky =

Argentine footballer

Personal information
- Date of birth: 6 March 1997 (age 29)
- Place of birth: Algarrobo, Buenos Aires, Argentina
- Height: 1.78 m (5 ft 10 in)
- Position: Forward

Team information
- Current team: Audax Italiano

Youth career
- Olimpo

Senior career*
Years	Team	Apps	(Gls)
2016–2018	Olimpo	56	(8)
2018–2024	Unión Santa Fe	56	(12)
2021	→ San Lorenzo (loan)	16	(2)
2021–2022	→ Atlas (loan)	20	(0)
2022–2023	→ Lanús (loan)	47	(6)
2024	→ Gimnasia LP (loan)	19	(1)
2025–	Audax Italiano	0	(0)
- * Club domestic league appearances and goals as of 18:50, 11 January 2025 (UTC)

Franco Troyansky (born 6 March 1997) is an Argentine professional footballer who plays for Chilean club Audax Italiano.

== Career ==
Ended his contract with Unión Santa Fe, Troyansky signed with Chilean Primera División club Audax Italiano in January 2025.

== Personal life ==
Born in Argentina, Troyansky is of Polish descent.

== Career statistics ==
As of match played on 17 March 2018

Appearances and goals by club, season and competition
Club	Season	League			Cup		League Cup		Other		Total	
Club	Season	Division	Apps	Goals	Apps	Goals	Apps	Goals	Apps	Goals	Apps	Goals
Olimpo	2016	Argentine Primera División	9	2	1	0	—				10	2
Olimpo	2016–17	Argentine Primera División	19	1	1	0	—				20	1
Olimpo	2017–18	Argentine Primera División	17	4	3	1	—				20	5
Career totals			45	7	5	1	0	0	0	0	50	8

== Honours ==
Atlas

- Liga MX: Apertura 2021, Clausura 2022
- Campeón de Campeones: 2022
