= Pablo Parra =

Chilean footballer (born 1994)

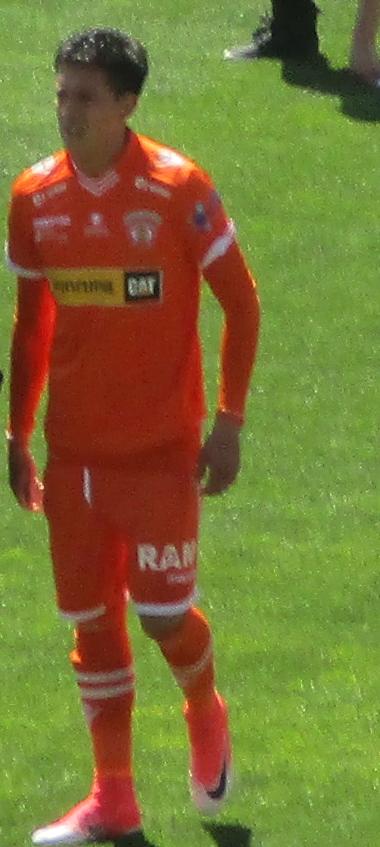
- Parra with Cobreloa in 2017

Personal information
- Full name: Pablo Alejandro Parra Rubilar
- Date of birth: 23 July 1994 (age 32)
- Place of birth: Chillán, Chile
- Height: 1.75 m (5 ft 9 in)
- Positions: Attacking midfielder; winger

Team information
- Current team: Universidad de Concepción

Youth career
- Ñublense

Senior career*
Years	Team	Apps	(Gls)
2010–2016	Ñublense	71	(6)
2013	Ñublense B	11	(2)
2014	→ Coquimbo Unido (loan)	14	(2)
2016–2021	Cobreloa	62	(10)
2019	→ Universidad de Chile (loan)	13	(0)
2020–2021	→ Curicó Unido (loan)	24	(7)
2021	Curicó Unido	5	(3)
2021–2023	Puebla	48	(6)
2023–2024	Colo-Colo	11	(0)
2024	Unión La Calera	15	(3)
2025	Palestino	23	(1)
2026–	Universidad de Concepción	0	(0)

International career^{‡}
2021–	Chile	4	(1)
- * Club domestic league appearances and goals as of 31 December 2025 ‡ National team caps and goals as of 23 July 2026

Pablo Alejandro Parra Rubilar (born 23 July 1994) is a Chilean professional footballer who plays as a midfielder for Universidad de Concepción.

== Club career ==
After having renewed his contract with Curicó Unido from his loan from Cobreloa, he moved to Liga MX club Puebla on second half 2021.

Back In Chile, Parra joined Colo-Colo in the second half of 2023. In July 2024, he switched to Unión La Calera.

Parra joined Palestino for the 2025 season.

On 31 December 2025, Parra signed with Universidad de Concepción.

== International career ==
In November 2020, he received his first call up to the Chile senior team for the 2022 World Cup qualifiers against Peru and Venezuela, but he didn't make any appearance. He made his international debut at the friendly match against Bolivia on March 26, 2021, by replacing César Pinares at the minute 64.

== Career statistics ==
=== International ===
As of match played 1 February 2022

Appearances and goals by national team and year
National team	Year	Apps	Goals
Chile	2021	3	1
Chile	2022	1	0
Total		4	1

Scores and results list Chile's goal tally first, score column indicates score after each Parra goal.

List of international goals scored by Pablo Parra
No.	Date	Venue	Opponent	Score	Result	Competition
1	8 December 2021	Q2 Stadium, Austin, United States	Mexico	2–2	2–2	Friendly
