= Hugo Nervo =

Argentine footballer

Personal information
- Full name: Hugo Martín Nervo
- Date of birth: January 6, 1991 (age 35)
- Place of birth: San Nicolás de los Arroyos, Argentina
- Height: 1.83 m (6 ft 0 in)
- Position: Centre-back

Team information
- Current team: Huracán
- Number: 21

Senior career*
Years	Team	Apps	(Gls)
2009–2015	Arsenal de Sarandí	168	(2)
2015–2018	Huracán	92	(1)
2018–2021	Santos Laguna	36	(1)
2019–2021	→ Atlas (loan)	62	(0)
2021–2025	Atlas	145	(4)
2025–	Huracán	14	(2)

International career
2011	Argentina U20	11	(0)
2011	Argentina U22	3	(0)
- * Club domestic league appearances and goals as of 17:40, 6 July 2026 (UTC)

Hugo Martín Nervo (born January 6, 1991) is an Argentine professional footballer who plays as a defender for Huracán.

== Club career ==
Nervo made his league debut for Arsenal de Sarandí in a 1–1 draw with San Lorenzo on April 3, 2009, for the 2009 Clausura tournament.

On 23 July 2025, Nervo signed a contract with CA Huracán until December 2026.

== International career ==
Nervo was called by coach Sergio Batista for the Argentina U-21 national team that finished third in the 2009 Toulon Tournament. The following year, he was selected for the Argentine U-20 squad to play the 2011 South American Youth Championship.

== Honours ==
Arsenal de Sarandí

- Argentine Primera División: 2012 Clausura

Atlas

- Liga MX: Apertura 2021, Clausura 2022
- Campeón de Campeones: 2022

Individual

- Liga MX Best XI: Clausura 2022
- Liga MX Best Center-back: 2021–22
- Liga MX All-Star: 2022
