= Diego Cocca =

Argentine footballer and manager

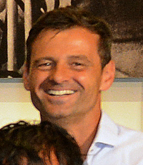
- Cocca in 2014

Personal information
- Full name: Diego Martín Cocca
- Date of birth: 11 February 1972 (age 54)
- Place of birth: Buenos Aires, Argentina
- Height: 1.74 m (5 ft 9 in)
- Position: Right-back

Senior career*
Years	Team	Apps	(Gls)
1990–1992	River Plate	25	(1)
1993	Deportivo Español	18	(0)
1994–1996	Ferro Carril Oeste	74	(0)
1996–1997	Lleida	11	(0)
1997–1999	Argentinos Juniors	72	(1)
1999–2001	Atlas	81	(1)
2001–2002	Banfield	48	(0)
2003–2004	Veracruz	50	(1)
2004	Banfield	18	(0)
2005	Querétaro	23	(0)
2005–2006	Argentinos Juniors	14	(0)
Total		434	(4)

International career
1991	Argentina U20		

Managerial career
- 2007–2008: C.A.I.
- 2008–2009: Godoy Cruz
- 2010: Gimnasia LP
- 2011: Santos Laguna
- 2011–2012: Huracán
- 2013–2014: Defensa y Justicia
- 2014–2015: Racing Club
- 2016: Millonarios
- 2017: Racing Club
- 2017–2018: Tijuana
- 2019–2020: Rosario Central
- 2020–2022: Atlas
- 2023: Tigres UANL
- 2023: Mexico
- 2024–2025: Valladolid
- 2025: Talleres
- 2025–2026: Atlas
Medal record
Men's football
Representing Mexico (as manager)
CONCACAF Nations League
Third place	2023 United States	Team
- * Club domestic league appearances and goals

Diego Martín Cocca (born 11 February 1972) is an Argentine professional football manager and former player who played as a right-back.

== Playing career ==
=== Club ===
Cocca started his career with River Plate in 1990. He was part of the squad that won the Apertura 1991 title. Subsequently, the defender had spells with Deportivo Español and Ferro Carril Oeste in the Argentine Primera División, before joining Lleida in Spain for the 1996–97 season.

Cocca returned to Argentina in 1997 to play for Argentinos Juniors. In 1999, he went to Mexico to play for Atlas.

In his later career, he had two spells with Banfield, and played for Veracruz and Querétaro in Mexico. He then returned to Argentinos Juniors in 2005. In 2006, he retired at the age of 34.

=== International ===
In 1991, Cocca was selected to join the Argentina U20 team to play in the 1991 FIFA World Youth Championship.

== Managerial career ==
=== Early career ===
Cocca took his first step into management by taking over at Comisión de Actividades Infantiles in the Argentine second division. On 29 October 2008, he took over managerial duties at first division team Godoy Cruz, after then-coach Daniel Oldrá stepped down to return to the club's youth divisions. On 3 November 2009, Cocca left Godoy Cruz.

=== 2010 – 2019 ===
On 23 December 2009, Gimnasia y Esgrima La Plata hired Cocca as its coach on a one-year deal. The former defender helped Gimnasia avoid relegation from the first division during the 2009–10 season, after defeating Atlético de Rafaela in the relegation playoff. However, Cocca resigned from his managerial duties after the 8th fixture of the 2010–11 season, due to the team's bad results during the start of the season.

On 21 February 2011, Cocca was named manager of Mexican side Santos Laguna. On 4 September, he was sacked from his job after a series of defeats.

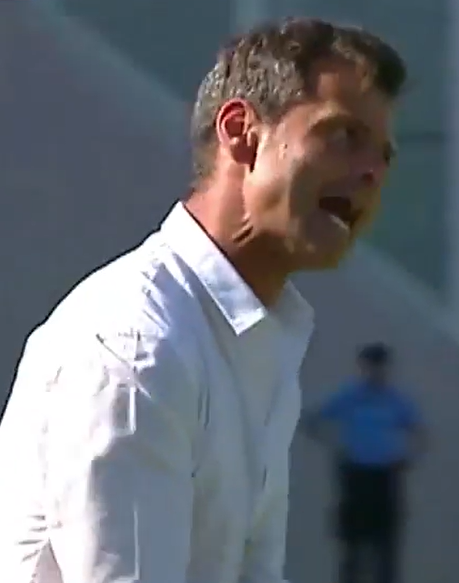
Cocca as manager of Racing Club in 2014

During the following decade, Cocca managed several clubs. In Argentina, he coached Huracán, Defensa y Justicia, Rosario Central, and Racing Club, winning the Argentine Primera División title with the latter; his first honor as a manager. He also led Millonarios in Colombia and Tijuana in Mexico.

=== 2020 – present ===
In August 2020, Cocca assumed the role of head coach at Atlas. Under his leadership, the club won two consecutive league titles, bringing an end to a 70-year drought.

On 16 November 2022, Tigres UANL appointed Cocca as their new head coach. Following the disclosure of his private negotiations with the Mexican Football Federation for the role of the national team's manager, Cocca was relieved of his duties on 8 February 2023.

On 10 February 2023, Cocca became the manager of the Mexico national team. On 19 June, following a disappointing showing at the 2023 CONCACAF Nations League Finals that included a 3–0 semifinal loss to the United States, he was dismissed from his position.

On 14 December 2024, Cocca was appointed manager of La Liga side Real Valladolid, signing a contract until the end of the season. On 17 February 2025, he was relieved of his duties after just eight games in charge.

On 28 May 2025, Cocca was named manager of Talleres back in his home country. On 8 July, Cocca resigned from his position without having coached a single match.

On 12 August 2025, Cocca took on the position of head coach at Atlas, starting his second spell with the club. On 13 July 2026, he left his position after failing to reach an agreement on renewing his contract with the team's new management.

== Managerial statistics ==
As of match played 9 May 2026

Managerial record by team and tenure
Team	Nat	From	To	Record							
Team	Nat	From	To	G	W	D	L	GF	GA	GD	Win %
C.A.I.	(Argentina)	15 October 2007	5 June 2008	27	11	7	9	40	35	+5	40.74
Godoy Cruz	(Argentina)	30 October 2008	2 November 2009	38	12	12	14	42	52	−10	31.58
Gimnasia LP	(Argentina)	1 January 2010	30 September 2010	29	8	8	13	27	39	−12	27.59
Santos Laguna	(Mexico)	21 February 2011	3 September 2011	11	5	0	6	21	18	+3	45.45
Huracán	(Argentina)	2 October 2011	27 February 2012	15	4	5	6	15	17	−2	26.67
Defensa y Justicia	(Argentina)	1 July 2013	30 June 2014	43	21	13	9	68	46	+22	48.84
Racing Club	(Argentina)	1 July 2014	31 December 2015	69	40	14	15	101	57	+44	57.97
Millonarios	(Colombia)	17 August 2016	31 December 2016	11	7	1	3	21	14	+7	63.64
Racing Club	(Argentina)	1 January 2017	27 November 2017	36	18	8	10	53	46	+7	50.00
Tijuana	(Mexico)	1 January 2018	30 October 2018	45	15	14	16	43	48	−5	33.33
Rosario Central	(Argentina)	19 March 2019	30 June 2020	33	12	11	10	41	44	−3	36.36
Atlas	(Mexico)	11 August 2020	4 October 2022	95	35	25	35	106	94	+12	36.84
Tigres UANL	(Mexico)	1 January 2023	9 February 2023	5	3	2	0	9	2	+7	60.00
Mexico	(Mexico)	10 February 2023	19 June 2023	7	3	3	1	10	8	+2	42.86
Valladolid	(Spain)	14 December 2024	17 February 2025	8	1	0	7	5	21	−16	12.50
Talleres	(Argentina)	28 May 2025	8 July 2025	0	0	0	0	0	0	+0	—
Atlas	(Mexico)	12 August 2025	13 July 2026	32	10	9	13	35	46	−11	31.25
Total				504	205	132	167	637	587	+50	40.67

== Honours ==
=== Player ===
River Plate

- Primera División Argentina: Apertura 1991

=== Manager ===
Racing

- Primera División: 2014 Transición

Atlas

- Liga MX: Apertura 2021, Clausura 2022
- Campeón de Campeones: 2022

Individual

- Liga MX Best Manager: 2021–22
- Liga MX All-Star: 2022
