= 2021–22 Liga MX season =

75th professional season of the top-flight football league in Mexico

Liga MX
- Season: 2021–22
- Champions: Apertura: Atlas (2nd title); Clausura: Atlas (3rd title)
- Champions League: Atlas; León; Pachuca; UANL
- Matches: 306; Apertura: 153; Clausura: 153
- Goals: 716 (2.34 per match); Apertura: 331 (2.16 per match); Clausura: 385 (2.52 per match)
- Top goalscorer: Apertura: Germán Berterame; Nicolás López (9 goals); Clausura: André-Pierre Gignac (11 goals)
- Biggest home win: Apertura: Pachuca 4–0 León (24 July 2021); Cruz Azul 4–0 Toluca (14 August 2021); Clausura: UNAM 5–0 Toluca (10 January 2022)
- Biggest away win: Apertura: Atlético San Luis 2–6 Atlas (24 October 2021); Clausura: Necaxa 0–4 Monterrey (14 January 2022)
- Highest scoring: Apertura: Atlético San Luis 2–6 Atlas (24 October 2021); Clausura: León 4–4 Toluca (1 May 2022)
- Longest winning run: Apertura: 5 matches América; Clausura: 6 matches América; Pachuca
- Longest unbeaten run: Apertura: 8 matches América; Clausura: 9 matches Puebla; UANL
- Longest winless run: Apertura: 9 matches Toluca; Clausura: 11 matches Juárez
- Longest losing run: Apertura: 4 matches Monterrey; Necaxa; Clausura: 7 matches Juárez
- Highest attendance: Apertura: 42,862; América vs Guadalajara (25 September 2021); Clausura: 52,360; América vs Cruz Azul (30 April 2022)
- Lowest attendance: Apertura: 2,747; Pachuca vs Juárez (24 October 2021); Clausura: 5,397; Atlético San Luis vs Juárez (20 January 2022)
- Total attendance: Apertura: 1,696,286; Clausura: 2,502,296
- Average attendance: Apertura: 11,699; Clausura: 16,907
- Stats are from the regular season only Source: Liga MX

The 2021–22 Liga MX season (known as the Liga BBVA MX for sponsorship reasons) was the 75th professional season of the top-flight football league in Mexico. The season was divided into two championships—the Apertura 2021 and the Clausura 2022—each in an identical format and each contested by the same eighteen teams.

On 5 March 2022, during a match between Queretaro and Atlas, a riot broke out in the stands at the Estadio Corregidora, resulting in 26 injuries.

== Clubs ==
=== Stadiums and locations ===
Team	Location	Stadium	Capacity
América	Mexico City	Azteca	87,000
Atlas	Guadalajara, Jalisco	Jalisco	55,110
Atlético San Luis	San Luis Potosí, San Luis Potosí	Alfonso Lastras	25,709
Cruz Azul	Mexico City	Azteca	87,000
Guadalajara	Zapopan, Jalisco	Akron	45,364
Juárez	Ciudad Juárez, Chihuahua	Olímpico Benito Juárez	19,703
León	León, Guanajuato	León	31,297
Mazatlán	Mazatlán, Sinaloa	Mazatlán	25,000
Monterrey	Guadalupe, Nuevo León	BBVA	53,500
Necaxa	Aguascalientes, Aguascalientes	Victoria	23,851
Pachuca	Pachuca, Hidalgo	Hidalgo	27,512
Puebla	Puebla, Puebla	Cuauhtémoc	51,726
Querétaro	Querétaro, Querétaro	Corregidora	33,162
Santos Laguna	Torreón, Coahuila	Corona	29,237
Tijuana	Tijuana, Baja California	Caliente	27,333
Toluca	Toluca, State of Mexico	Nemesio Díez	31,000
UANL	San Nicolás de los Garza, Nuevo León	Universitario	41,886
UNAM	Mexico City	Olímpico Universitario	48,297

=== Stadium changes ===
Querétaro (Clausura 2022 Week 11)
Estadio Morelos
Capacity: 34,795

Locations of the 2021–22 Liga MX teams
Greater Mexico City Liga MX football clubs

=== Personnel and kits ===
Team	Chairman	Head coach	Captain	Kit manufacturer	Shirt sponsor(s)
América	Santiago Baños	(Argentina) Fernando Ortiz (Interim)	(Mexico) Guillermo Ochoa	Nike	AT&T
Atlas	José Riestra	(Argentina) Diego Cocca	(Mexico) Aldo Rocha	Charly	None
Atlético San Luis	Alberto Marrero	(Brazil) André Jardine	(Mexico) Javier Güémez	Pirma	Canel's
Cruz Azul	Jaime Ordiales	(Peru) Juan Reynoso	(Mexico) José de Jesús Corona	Joma	Cemento Cruz Azul
Guadalajara	Amaury Vergara	(Mexico) Ricardo Cadena	(Mexico) Jesús Molina	Puma	Caliente
Juárez	Miguel Ángel Garza	(Brazil) Ricardo Ferretti	(Uruguay) Maximiliano Olivera	Sporelli	S-Mart
León	Jesús Martínez Murguia	(Mexico) Christian Martínez (Interim)	(Mexico) Luis Montes	Charly	Cementos Fortaleza
Mazatlán	Mauricio Lanz González	(Mexico) Gabriel Caballero	(Uruguay) Nicolás Vikonis	Pirma	Caliente
Monterrey	Duilio Davino	(Mexico) Víctor Manuel Vucetich	(Colombia) Stefan Medina	Puma	Codere
Necaxa	Ernesto Tinajero Flores	(Mexico) Jaime Lozano	(Mexico) Fernando González	Pirma	Rolcar
Pachuca	Armando Martínez Patiño	(Uruguay) Guillermo Almada	(Argentina) Oscar Ustari	Charly	Cementos Fortaleza
Puebla	Manuel Jiménez García	(Argentina) Nicolás Larcamón	(Mexico) Javier Salas	Umbro	Baz
Querétaro	José Antonio Núñez	(Argentina) Hernán Cristante	(Uruguay) Maximiliano Perg	Charly	Pedigree
Santos Laguna	Dante Elizalde	(Mexico) Eduardo Fentanes (Interim)	(Mexico) Carlos Acevedo	Charly	Soriana
Tijuana	Jorge Hank Inzunsa	(Argentina) Sebastián Méndez	(Mexico) Jonathan Orozco	Charly	Caliente
Toluca	Francisco Suinaga	(Mexico) Ignacio Ambríz	(Argentina) Alexis Canelo	Under Armour	Roshfrans
UANL	Mauricio Culebro	(Mexico) Miguel Herrera	(Argentina) Nahuel Guzmán	Adidas	Cemex
UNAM	Leopoldo Silva Gutiérrez	(Argentina) Andrés Lillini	(Mexico) Alfredo Talavera	Nike	DHL

=== Managerial changes ===
Team	Outgoing manager	Manner of departure	Date of vacancy	Replaced by	Date of appointment	Position in table	Ref.
Pre-Apertura changes
Atlético San Luis	(Uruguay) Leonel Rocco	Sacked	30 April 2021	(Uruguay) Marcelo Méndez	19 June 2021	Preseason	
Mazatlán	(Mexico) Tomás Boy	Sacked	3 May 2021	(Spain) Beñat San José	18 May 2021	Preseason	
UANL	(Brazil) Ricardo Ferretti	End of Contract	8 May 2021	(Mexico) Miguel Herrera	20 May 2021	Preseason	
León	(Mexico) Ignacio Ambriz	End of Contract	9 May 2021	(Argentina) Ariel Holan	11 May 2021	Preseason	
Juárez	(Mexico) Alfonso Sosa	Sacked	3 June 2021	(Brazil) Ricardo Ferretti	3 June 2021	Preseason	
Apertura changes
Querétaro	(Mexico) Héctor Altamirano	Sacked	22 August 2021	(Uruguay) Leonardo Ramos	23 August 2021	16th	
Guadalajara	(Mexico) Víctor Manuel Vucetich	Sacked	19 September 2021	(Mexico) Marcelo Michel Leaño (Interim)	20 September 2021	9th	
Necaxa	(Mexico) Guillermo Vázquez	Sacked	24 September 2021	(Argentina) Pablo Guede	27 September 2021 (Note: Although appointed on 27 September 2021, Guede would not immediately take charge. Due to league schedule, his first match will be delayed to 3 October 2021 vs UANL.)	15th	
Tijuana	(Uruguay) Robert Siboldi	Sacked	29 September 2021	(Mexico) Ignacio Palou (Interim)	3 October 2021	18th	
Tijuana	(Mexico) Ignacio Palou (Interim)	End of tenure as caretaker	8 October 2021	(Argentina) Sebastián Méndez	8 October 2021	18th	
Guadalajara	(Mexico) Marcelo Michel Leaño (Interim)	Ratified as manager	3 November 2021	(Mexico) Marcelo Michel Leaño	3 November 2021	12th	
Pre-Clausura changes
Pachuca	(Uruguay) Paulo Pezzolano	Mutual agreement termination	8 November 2021	(Uruguay) Guillermo Almada	2 December 2021	Preseason	
Santos Laguna	(Uruguay) Guillermo Almada	Mutual agreement termination	29 November 2021	(Portugal) Pedro Caixinha	1 December 2021	Preseason	
Toluca	(Argentina) Hernán Cristante	Sacked	29 November 2021	(Mexico) Ignacio Ambríz	1 December 2021	Preseason	
Clausura changes
Atlético San Luis	(Uruguay) Marcelo Méndez	Sacked	26 January 2022	(Mexico) Rafael Fernández (Interim)	26 January 2022	18th	
Atlético San Luis	(Mexico) Rafael Fernández (Interim)	End of tenure as caretaker	3 February 2022	(Brazil) André Jardine	3 February 2022	18th	
Necaxa	(Argentina) Pablo Guede	Sacked	8 February 2022	(Mexico) Jaime Lozano	9 February 2022	14th	
Querétaro	(Uruguay) Leonardo Ramos	Sacked	8 February 2022	(Argentina) Hernán Cristante	9 February 2022	15th	
Santos Laguna	(Portugal) Pedro Caixinha	Sacked	24 February 2022	(Mexico) Eduardo Fentanes (Interim)	24 February 2022	18th	
Monterrey	(Mexico) Javier Aguirre	Sacked	27 February 2022	(Argentina) Hugo Norberto Castillo (Interim)	28 February 2022	16th	
América	(Argentina) Santiago Solari	Sacked	2 March 2022	(Argentina) Fernando Ortiz (Interim)	3 March 2022	17th	
Monterrey	(Argentina) Hugo Norberto Castillo (Interim)	End of tenure as caretaker	2 March 2022	(Mexico) Víctor Manuel Vucetich	2 March 2022	15th	
Mazatlán	(Spain) Beñat San José	Sacked	2 March 2022	(Mexico) Christian Ramírez (Interim)	3 March 2022	14th	
Mazatlán	(Mexico) Christian Ramírez (Interim)	End of tenure as caretaker	3 March 2022	(Mexico) Gabriel Caballero	14 March 2022	18th	
Guadalajara	(Mexico) Marcelo Michel Leaño	Sacked	14 April 2022	(Mexico) Ricardo Cadena (Interim)	14 April 2022	14th	
León	(Argentina) Ariel Holan	Resigned	21 April 2022	(Mexico) Christian Martínez (Interim)	21 April 2022	12th	

== Torneo Apertura ==
The Grita México Apertura 2021 was the first tournament of the season. The tournament was renamed Torneo Grita México Apertura 2021 (stylized as Grita... México A21) with the intention of encouraging fans in the stands not to scream an offensive chant after a goal kick. The tournament began on 22 July. The defending champions were Cruz Azul.

=== Regular phase ===
==== League table ====
Pos	Team	Pld	W	D	L	GF	GA	GD	Pts	Qualification
1	América	17	10	5	2	21	10	+11	35	Qualification for the quarter-finals (Note: The first four places in the table qualified for the quarter-finals.)
2	Atlas (C)	17	8	5	4	21	10	+11	29	Qualification for the quarter-finals
3	León	17	8	5	4	20	14	+6	29	Qualification for the quarter-finals
4	UANL	17	7	7	3	26	14	+12	28	Qualification for the quarter-finals
5	Santos Laguna	17	5	9	3	23	16	+7	24	Qualification for the reclassification (Note: Teams ranked 5th to 12th in the table qualified for reclassification.)
6	Toluca	17	6	6	5	22	22	0	24	Qualification for the reclassification
7	Puebla	17	6	6	5	16	16	0	24	Qualification for the reclassification
8	Cruz Azul	17	5	8	4	21	17	+4	23	Qualification for the reclassification
9	Monterrey	17	5	7	5	19	16	+3	22	Qualification for the reclassification
10	Guadalajara	17	5	7	5	13	13	0	22	Qualification for the reclassification
11	UNAM	17	5	6	6	17	23	−6	21	Qualification for the reclassification
12	Atlético San Luis	17	4	8	5	19	23	−4	20	Qualification for the reclassification
13	Mazatlán	17	5	5	7	18	24	−6	20	
14	Necaxa	17	6	2	9	16	22	−6	20	
15	Pachuca	17	4	6	7	19	21	−2	18	
16	Juárez	17	4	4	9	14	25	−11	16	
17	Querétaro	17	3	6	8	11	19	−8	15	
18	Tijuana	17	3	6	8	16	27	−11	15	

Source: Liga MX
Rules for classification: 1) Points; 2) Goal difference; 3) Number of goals scored; 4) Head-to-head results between tied teams; 5) Number of goals scored away; 6) Highest relegation coefficient; 7) Fair Play points
(C) Champions

==== Positions by round ====
Leader and qualification to Liguilla
Qualification to Liguilla
Qualification to Reclassification
Last place in table

Team ╲ Round	1	2	3	4	5	6	7	8	9	10	11	12	13	14	15	16	17
América	9	7	4	1	1	1	1	1	1	1	1	1	1	1	1	1	1
Atlas	10	5	5	6	7	7	8	5	3	4	4	2	2	2	2	2	2
León	18	11	6	3	2	2	2	3	4	6	7	8	6	7	5	6	3
UANL	5	10	10	11	6	3	4	4	7	8	5	5	5	3	4	3	4
Santos Laguna	2	3	7	9	9	9	5	6	10	10	11	9	11	12	11	9	5
Toluca	3	1	1	2	3	4	3	2	2	3	3	3	3	4	3	4	6
Puebla	7	14	15	16	14	15	14	14	13	14	13	15	13	9	10	8	7
Cruz Azul	16	13	11	5	5	6	7	8	8	7	8	6	7	6	6	5	8
Monterrey	8	4	8	4	4	5	6	7	5	2	2	4	4	5	7	7	9
Guadalajara	13	9	9	10	12	13	11	10	9	9	9	11	9	8	9	12	10
UNAM	11	15	16	17	18	14	15	17	16	16	17	17	17	17	14	14	11
Atlético San Luis	6	6	2	7	10	10	9	9	6	5	6	7	8	10	12	13	12
Mazatlán	4	2	3	8	8	11	12	12	11	11	10	12	10	11	8	11	13
Necaxa	17	17	18	14	11	8	10	11	12	15	12	14	15	16	13	10	14
Pachuca	1	8	12	12	13	12	13	13	15	13	14	10	12	13	15	15	15
Juárez	15	18	14	15	17	17	18	18	14	12	15	13	14	15	16	16	16
Querétaro	12	12	13	13	15	16	17	15	17	18	16	16	16	14	17	17	17
Tijuana	14	16	17	18	16	18	16	16	18	17	18	18	18	18	18	18	18

Source: Liga MX

=== Results ===
Teams played every other team once (either at home or away), completing a total of 17 rounds.

Home \ Away	AMÉ	ATL	ASL	CAZ	GUA	JUÁ	LEÓ	MAZ	MON	NEC	PAC	PUE	QUE	SAN	TIJ	TOL	UNL	UNM
América	—	—	—	—	0–0	—	—	2–0	0–0	2–1	—	2–0	—	2–1	2–0	—	1–0	2–0
Atlas	0–1	—	—	0–0	—	2–0	2–0	—	2–1	—	—	0–1	2–0	—	0–2	0–0	—	—
Atlético San Luis	0–1	2–6	—	0–0	—	—	—	—	1–1	0–2	—	—	1–1	—	4–1	—	0–3	—
Cruz Azul	2–1	—	—	—	—	—	0–1	0–2	1–1	—	1–1	—	2–0	—	—	4–0	1–1	—
Guadalajara	—	0–1	1–2	1–1	—	2–2	0–3	—	—	2–1	1–0	—	—	—	—	2–0	—	—
Juárez	1–2	—	1–0	2–1	—	—	—	—	3–1	—	—	0–2	0–0	—	1–1	1–3	—	—
León	1–1	—	0–0	—	—	0–1	—	3–0	—	3–0	—	—	—	1–1	2–1	—	—	1–2
Mazatlán	—	1–0	2–2	—	0–1	3–1	—	—	1–1	—	2–1	—	2–1	—	—	—	0–3	2–2
Monterrey	—	—	—	—	0–0	—	0–1	—	—	0–1	3–1	1–1	—	—	—	2–0	2–0	2–0
Necaxa	—	0–3	—	1–2	—	1–0	—	2–1	—	—	—	0–1	—	0–3	3–0	—	—	3–0
Pachuca	1–1	0–1	0–0	—	—	1–1	4–0	—	—	1–0	—	—	—	1–1	—	1–2	—	1–1
Puebla	—	—	2–2	1–1	0–2	—	0–1	2–0	—	—	1–2	—	1–0	2–2	—	1–0	1–1	—
Querétaro	0–0	—	—	—	1–0	—	0–1	—	1–0	3–0	0–2	—	—	2–3	1–1	—	—	—
Santos Laguna	—	1–1	0–0	1–1	0–0	2–0	—	1–0	1–2	—	—	1–1	—	—	—	2–2	—	—
Tijuana	—	—	—	0–1	0–0	—	—	0–0	2–2	—	3–2	1–1	—	2–1	—	0–2	1–2	—
Toluca	3–1	—	1–2	—	—	—	0–0	2–2	—	1–1	—	—	1–1	—	—	—	3–1	2–1
UANL	—	1–1	—	—	2–1	3–0	2–2	—	—	0–0	3–0	—	3–0	1–1	—	—	—	1–1
UNAM	—	0–0	1–3	4–3	0–0	1–0	—	—	—	—	—	2–0	0–0	0–3	3–1	—	—	—

Source: Liga MX
Legend: Blue = home team win; Yellow = draw; Red = away team win.
For upcoming matches, an "a" indicates there is an article about the rivalry between the two participants.

=== Individual statistics ===
- First goal of the season:
  (Colombia) Juan Otero for Santos Laguna against Necaxa (23 July 2021)
- Last goal of the season:
  (Brazil) Diogo de Olivera for UNAM against Cruz Azul (7 November 2021)

==== Top goalscorers ====
Players sorted first by goals scored, then by last name.

Rank	Player	Club	Goals
1	(Argentina) Germán Berterame	Atlético San Luis	9
1	(Uruguay) Nicolás López	UANL	9
3	(Brazil) Camilo Sanvezzo	Mazatlán	8
4	(Chile) Víctor Dávila	León	6
4	(Argentina) Julio Furch	Atlas	6
4	(Mexico) Alejandro Zendejas	Necaxa	6
7	(Argentina) Juan Ignacio Dinenno	UNAM	5
7	(Colombia) Julián Quiñones	Atlas	5
7	(Uruguay) Christian Tabó	Puebla	5
7	(Chile) Diego Valdés	Santos Laguna	5

Source: Liga MX

==== Hat-tricks ====
Player	For	Against	Result	Date
(Argentina) Germán Berterame	Atlético San Luis	Tijuana	4–1 (H)	16 September 2021
(Chile) Víctor Dávila	León	Necaxa	3–0 (H)	6 November 2021
(Mexico) Roberto Alvarado	Cruz Azul	UNAM	3–4 (A)	7 November 2021

Notes

(H) – Home team
(A) – Away team

=== Attendance ===
	Home match played behind closed doors
	Away match
	Highest attended match of the week
	Lowest attended match of the week
PPD	Match postponed

Team	Week																	Total Att	Avg.	Total Pld
Team	1	2	3	4	5	6	7	8	9	10	11	12	13	14	15	16	17	Total Att	Avg.	Total Pld
América		9,590	8,567			11,655		14,637		42,862		27,571		16,918	32,675		25,654	190,129	21,125	9
Atlas		7,859		13,637		7,239		5,568		8,832	9,902			9,604		10,299	10,421	83,361	9,262	9
Atlético San Luis		6,917		4,128		3,909			3,038		9,545		16,373		9,309	7,690		60,909	7,614	8
Cruz Azul	9,598			8,588	7,720		14,626		14,882		17,928		20,894			31,257		125,493	15,687	8
Guadalajara	11,647		9,208		10,892		9,603		11,135			21,709	15,019		20,432			109,705	13,713	8
Juárez	7,345			7,806	13,992			11,623		10,646		9,608		11,906		10,942		83,868	10,484	8
León		8,863		9,663		9,239	12,719		10,078			9,675		12,333			11,240	83,810	10,484	8
Mazatlán		4,675	6,543			7,733	5,477		7,902		5,880		8,120		9,107		12,830	68,267	7,585	9
Monterrey	20,267	20,943		15,833		15,467			26,755		19,836		26,078		23,077			168,256	21,032	8
Necaxa	9,153		13,187		9,242	8,983			11,020		7,251		8,723			10,809		78,368	9,796	8
Pachuca					10,683					4,710	7,454		5,503		2,747	6,887		37,984	6,331	6
Puebla		6,800		7,654			6,086	3,370		14,782		5,906		5,624	15,101		16,136	81,459	9,051	9
Querétaro	10,221		10,031			5,190		5,704			6,812		8,471	10,595		13,254		70,278	8,785	8
Santos Laguna		12,200		13,082	11,998		11,691		11,431	14,484		11,293			12,511		14,658	113,348	12,594	9
Tijuana	4,333		5,333		3,333		3,333	6,333		7,333		10,333		10,333			6,333	56,997	6,333	9
Toluca		8,540			7,091		9,566		10,297	6,833		6,585		10,090		11,210		70,212	8,777	8
UANL			14,350		9,264		11,225	12,962		15,581		15,797		24,153		25,523	26,243	155,098	17,233	9
UNAM											14,190		9,000		11,981		23,573	58,744	14,686	4
Total	72,564	86,387	67,219	80,391	84,215	69,415	84,326	60,197	106,538	126,063	98,798	118,477	118,181	111,556	137,000	127,871	147,088	1,696,286	11,699	145

Source: Liga MX

==== Highest and lowest ====
Highest attended					Lowest attended			
Week	Home	Score	Away	Attendance	Home	Score	Away	Attendance
1	Monterrey	1–1	Puebla	20,267	Tijuana	1–2	UANL	4,333
2	Monterrey	2–0	UNAM	20,943	Mazatlán	2–1	Pachuca	4,675
3	UANL	1–1	Santos Laguna	14,350	Tijuana	0–2	Toluca	5,333
4	Monterrey	3–1	Pachuca	15,833	Atlético San Luis	0–2	Necaxa	4,128
5	Juárez	1–2	América	13,992	Tijuana	1–1	Puebla	3,333
6	Monterrey	0–0	Guadalajara	15,467	Atlético San Luis	0–0	Cruz Azul	3,909
7	Cruz Azul	1–1	Pachuca	14,626	Tijuana	2–2	Monterrey	3,333
8	América	2–0	Mazatlán	14,637	Puebla	2–2	Atlético San Luis	3,370
9	Monterrey	2–0	UANL	26,755	Atlético San Luis	4–1	Tijuana	3,038
10	América	0–0	Guadalajara	42,862	Pachuca	1–0	Necaxa	4,710
11	Monterrey	2–0	Toluca	19,836	Mazatlán	3–1	Juárez	5,880
12	América	2–0	UNAM	27,571	Puebla	1–2	Pachuca	5,906
13	Monterrey	0–1	León	26,078	Pachuca	1–1	Santos Laguna	5,503
14	UANL	3–0	Pachuca	24,153	Puebla	2–0	Mazatlán	5,624
15	América	1–0	UANL	32,675	Pachuca	1–1	Juárez	2,747
16	Cruz Azul	2–1	América	31,257	Pachuca	1–1	UNAM	6,887
17	UANL	3–0	Juárez	26,243	Tijuana	3–2	Pachuca	6,333

Source: Liga MX

1. Does not include matches played behind closed doors.

=== Final phase ===
==== Reclassification ====
Team 1	Score	Team 2
Santos Laguna	2–0	Atlético San Luis
Toluca	1–2	UNAM
Puebla	2–2 (6–5 p)	Guadalajara
Cruz Azul	1–4	Monterrey

- All games were played in a single-leg hosted by the higher seed.
- If a game ended in a draw, it proceeded directly to a penalty shoot-out.

==== Bracket ====
Quarter-finals
2	Atlas (s)	0	1	1
7	Monterrey	0	1	1
1	América	0	1	1
8	UNAM	0	3	3
3	León	1	2	3
6	Puebla	2	0	2
4	UANL (s)	1	1	2
5	Santos Laguna	2	0	2

Semi-finals
2	Atlas (s)	1	0	1
8	UNAM	0	1	1
3	León (s)	1	2	3
4	UANL	2	1	3

Finals
2	Atlas (p)	2	1	3 (4)
3	León	3	0	3 (3)

- Teams were re-seeded each round.
- The winners of the Reclassification matches were seeded based on their ranking in the classification table.
- Team with more goals on aggregate after two matches advanced.
- No away goals rule is applied in neither round, if the two teams were tied on aggregate, the higher seeded team advanced.
- In the final, if the two teams were tied after both legs, the match went to extra time and, if necessary, a shoot-out.
- Both finalists qualified to the 2023 CONCACAF Champions League.

==== Quarterfinals ====
Team 1	Agg.	Team 2	1st leg	2nd leg
UNAM	3–1	América	0–0	3–1
Monterrey	1–1 (s)	Atlas	0–0	1–1
Puebla	2–3	León	2–1	0–2
Santos Laguna	2–2 (s)	UANL	2–1	0–1

==== Semifinals ====
Team 1	Agg.	Team 2	1st leg	2nd leg
UNAM	1–1 (s)	Atlas	0–1	1–0
UANL	3–3 (s)	León	2–1	1–2

==== Finals ====
Team 1	Agg.	Team 2	1st leg	2nd leg
León	3–3 (3–4 p)	Atlas	3–2	0–1 (a.e.t.)

== Torneo Clausura ==
The Grita México Clausura 2022 was the second tournament of the season. Like the Apertura 2021, the tournament was renamed Torneo Grita México Clausura 2022 (stylized as Grita... México C22) with the intention of encouraging fans in the stands not to scream an offensive chant after a goal kick. Atlas are the defending champions.

=== Regular phase ===
==== League table ====
Pos	Team	Pld	W	D	L	GF	GA	GD	Pts	Qualification
1	Pachuca	17	12	2	3	30	15	+15	38	Qualification for the quarter-finals (Note: The first four places in the table qualified for the Liguilla quarter-finals.)
2	UANL	17	10	3	4	30	20	+10	33	Qualification for the quarter-finals
3	Atlas (C)	17	7	6	4	21	15	+6	27 (Note: The match between Querétaro and Atlas was stopped in the 60th minute, with the score Querétaro 0–1 Atlas, after a brawl broke out in the stands between fans and a subsequent pitch invasion. As a result, Atlas was given a 0–3 victory.)	Qualification for the quarter-finals
4	América	17	7	5	5	24	17	+7	26	Qualification for the quarter-finals
5	Puebla	17	7	5	5	25	19	+6	26	Qualification for the reclassification (Note: Teams ranked 5th to 12th in the table qualified for Reclassification.)
6	Guadalajara	17	7	5	5	25	21	+4	26	Qualification for the reclassification
7	Monterrey	17	7	5	5	21	17	+4	26	Qualification for the reclassification
8	Cruz Azul	17	7	4	6	20	17	+3	25	Qualification for the reclassification
9	Necaxa	17	7	2	8	21	21	0	23	Qualification for the reclassification
10	Atlético San Luis	17	7	2	8	21	22	−1	23	Qualification for the reclassification
11	UNAM	17	6	4	7	24	21	+3	22	Qualification for the reclassification
12	Mazatlán	17	6	3	8	20	24	−4	21	Qualification for the reclassification
13	León	17	5	6	6	17	22	−5	21	
14	Santos Laguna	17	5	5	7	25	25	0	20	
15	Toluca	17	5	4	8	21	36	−15	19	
16	Querétaro	17	3	8	6	18	21	−3	17	
17	Tijuana	17	4	5	8	14	26	−12	17	
18	Juárez	17	3	2	12	10	28	−18	11	Team ended last place in the coefficient table (Note: The last place team in the coefficient table cannot qualify for the final phase, the 13th place team qualifies in their stead.)

Source: Liga MX
Rules for classification: 1) Points; 2) Goal difference; 3) Number of goals scored; 4) Head-to-head results between tied teams; 5) Number of goals scored away; 6) Highest relegation coefficient; 7) Fair Play points
(C) Champions

==== Positions by round ====
Leader and qualification to Liguilla
Qualification to Liguilla
Qualification to Reclassification
Last place in table

Team ╲ Round	1	2	3	4	5	6	7	8	9	10	11	12	13	14	15	16	17
Pachuca	3	2	5	4	3	2	2	1	2	1	1	2	1	2	1	1	1
UANL	7	13	11	6	5	4	3	3	3	3	2	1	2	1	2	2	2
Atlas	13	6	3	3	2	5	5	6	4	4	4	5	4	5	6	4	3
América	6	11	14	16	13	16	17	18	18	17	15	14	11	8	7	5	4
Puebla	9	5	1	1	1	1	1	2	1	2	3	3	3	3	3	3	5
Guadalajara	2	7	10	5	8	9	10	10	9	9	10	13	14	11	8	7	6
Monterrey	11	4	8	10	11	14	16	17	11	8	7	8	6	4	5	8	7
Cruz Azul	4	3	2	2	4	3	4	4	6	5	6	4	5	6	4	6	8
Necaxa	14	18	12	14	10	11	13	13	13	12	8	11	15	12	9	9	9
Atlético San Luis	16	17	18	13	17	17	14	15	16	14	16	15	9	13	10	10	10
UNAM	1	1	4	7	6	6	6	7	8	10	13	9	10	7	11	12	11
Mazatlán	17	16	17	18	15	13	15	16	17	18	18	17	17	17	16	13	12
León	12	10	9	11	12	8	7	5	5	6	5	6	7	9	12	11	13
Santos Laguna	8	12	16	17	18	18	18	14	15	11	12	10	13	14	14	15	14
Toluca	10	14	13	15	16	12	11	11	14	16	14	16	16	16	17	17	16
Tijuana	15	15	15	12	14	15	9	8	10	13	9	12	12	15	15	16	17
Juárez	5	8	6	8	9	10	12	12	12	15	17	18	18	18	18	18	18

Source: Liga MX

=== Results ===
Teams played every other team once (either at home or away), completing a total of 17 rounds.

Home \ Away	AMÉ	ATL	ASL	CAZ	GUA	JUÁ	LEÓ	MAZ	MON	NEC	PAC	PUE	QUE	SAN	TIJ	TOL	UNL	UNM
América	—	0–2	2–3	0–0	—	3–0	2–0	—	—	—	1–3	—	1–1	—	—	3–0	—	—
Atlas	—	—	1–0	—	1–1	—	—	1–2	—	2–1	0–1	—	—	2–1	—	—	1–1	0–0
Atlético San Luis	—	—	—	—	2–2	0–1	2–0	1–0	—	—	0–2	2–1	—	1–3	—	0–1	—	2–0
Cruz Azul	—	1–0	0–1	—	0–1	1–0	—	—	—	1–2	—	1–3	—	1–2	2–0	—	—	2–1
Guadalajara	0–0	—	—	—	—	—	—	3–0	1–3	—	—	2–3	1–1	1–0	2–1	—	1–3	3–1
Juárez	—	1–2	—	—	1–3	—	0–1	0–2	—	2–1	1–2	—	—	0–0	—	—	2–3	0–1
León	—	1–1	—	0–1	2–1	—	—	—	0–0	—	2–1	0–1	1–1	—	—	4–4	0–3	—
Mazatlán	2–1	—	—	1–1	—	—	1–2	—	—	0–0	—	2–1	—	1–0	2–0	1–2	—	—
Monterrey	2–1	0–0	0–2	2–2	—	3–0	—	2–1	—	—	—	—	0–0	1–0	2–0	—	—	—
Necaxa	0–1	—	4–2	—	0–1	—	0–1	—	0–4	—	1–3	—	1–0	—	—	0–1	2–0	—
Pachuca	—	—	—	1–0	2–1	—	—	3–1	3–0	—	—	1–0	2–2	—	0–0	—	2–1	—
Puebla	1–1	1–1	—	—	—	1–1	—	—	1–0	0–1	—	—	—	2–2	3–1	—	—	2–2
Querétaro	—	0–3^{w/o}	2–1	0–1	—	4–0	—	2–0	—	—	—	0–2	—	—	—	1–1	0–1	1–3
Santos Laguna	2–3	—	—	—	—	—	1–1	—	—	1–4	3–1	—	1–1	—	4–0	—	1–1	3–2
Tijuana	1–3	2–0	1–1	—	—	1–0	1–1	—	—	1–1	—	—	2–2	—	—	—	—	1–0
Toluca	—	2–4	—	1–4	1–1	0–1	—	—	2–2	—	0–3	2–1	—	3–1	1–2	—	—	—
UANL	0–2	—	2–1	2–2	—	—	—	4–3	2–0	—	—	0–2	—	—	2–0	3–0	—	—
UNAM	0–0	—	—	—	—	—	2–1	1–1	2–0	1–3	2–0	—	—	—	—	5–0	1–2	—

Source: Liga MX
Legend: Blue = home team win; Yellow = draw; Red = away team win.
For upcoming matches, an "a" indicates there is an article about the rivalry between the two participants.

=== Individual statistics ===
- First goal of the season:
  (Argentina) Nicolás Ibáñez for Pachuca against Atlético San Luis (6 January 2022)
- Last goal of the season:
  (Colombia) Jaine Barreiro for León against Toluca (1 May 2022)

==== Top goalscorers ====
Players sorted first by goals scored, then by last name.

Rank	Player	Club	Goals
1	(France) André-Pierre Gignac	UANL	11
2	(Uruguay) Rodrigo Aguirre	Necaxa	9
2	(Argentina) Nicolás Ibáñez	Pachuca	9
4	(Argentina) Germán Berterame	Atlético San Luis	7
4	(Uruguay) Leonardo Fernández	Toluca	7
6	(Venezuela) Fernando Aristeguieta	Puebla	6
6	(Brazil) Rogério	UNAM	6
6	(Mexico) Víctor Guzmán	Pachuca	6
6	(Colombia) Harold Preciado	Santos Laguna	6
6	(Colombia) Julián Quiñones	Atlas	6

Source: Liga MX

==== Hat-tricks ====
Player	For	Against	Result	Date
(Venezuela) Fernando Aristeguieta	Puebla	Cruz Azul	3–1 (A)	5 March 2022

Notes

(H) – Home team
(A) – Away team

=== Attendance ===
Pos	Team	Total	High	Low	Average	Change
1	UANL	237,786	41,473	10,497	29,723	+72.5%
2	América	226,233	52,360	16,968	28,279	+33.9%
3	Monterrey	246,169	40,327	16,508	27,352	+30.0%
4	Puebla	185,572	35,040	11,180	23,197	+156.3%
5	Guadalajara	205,597	33,047	15,193	22,844	+66.6%
6	Cruz Azul	193,131	33,924	12,686	21,459	+36.8%
7	Atlas	137,445	21,968	12,588	17,181	+85.5%
8	UNAM	136,149	42,650	8,493	17,019	+15.9%
9	Tijuana	120,164	27,333	8,333	15,021	+137.2%
10	Necaxa	109,759	20,537	8,921	13,720	+40.1%^{1}
11	León	117,446	18,732	8,997	13,050	+24.6%
12	Toluca	114,535	22,438	9,211	12,726	+45.0%
13	Querétaro	60,636	13,622	7,458	12,127	+38.0%^{2}
14	Santos Laguna	96,360	18,774	9,377	12,045	−4.4%
15	Mazatlán	91,547	15,729	8,221	11,443	+50.9%
16	Juárez	79,313	10,113	7,355	8,813	−15.9%
17	Pachuca	68,841	11,367	5,584	8,605	+35.9%
18	Atlético San Luis	75,613	14,998	5,397	8,401	+10.3%
	League total	2,502,296	52,360	5,397	16,907	+44.5%

Source: Liga MX
Notes:
Only regular season listed
1: Played one match behind closed doors
2: As a result of the riot on 5 March 2022, Querétaro will play all matches behind closed doors for one year. The ban began on 7 March 2022.

==== Highest and lowest ====
Highest attended					Lowest attended			
Week	Home	Score	Away	Attendance	Home	Score	Away	Attendance
1	Puebla	1–1	América	35,040	Atlético San Luis	0–2	Pachuca	6,841
2	UANL	0–2	Puebla	14,829	Pachuca	2–1	Guadalajara	6,692
3	América	0–2	Atlas	20,825	Atlético San Luis	0–1	Juárez	5,397
4	Atlas	2–1	Santos Laguna	17,346	Juárez	1–3	Guadalajara	7,801
5	Monterrey	3–0	Juárez	29,052	Atlético San Luis	0–1	Toluca	5,574
6	América	1–3	Pachuca	27,858	Juárez	0–0	Santos Laguna	7,355
7	UNAM	0–0	América	42,650	Pachuca	3–1	Mazatlán	6,875
8	UANL	2–2	Cruz Azul	36,978	Mazatlán	0–0	Necaxa	9,414
9	Monterrey	2–1	América	40,327	UNAM	1–1	Mazatlán	9,289
10	Guadalajara	0–0	América	33,047	Atlético San Luis	2–1	Puebla	5,904
11	UANL	2–0	Monterrey	41,473	Mazatlán	1–2	León	9,566
12	UANL	2–1	Tijuana	37,691	Atlético San Luis	1–0	Mazatlán	5,803
13	Monterrey	1–0	Santos Laguna	29,769	Atlético San Luis	2–0	León	6,102
14	UANL	3–0	Toluca	36,658	Juárez	1–2	Pachuca	8,568
15	América	2–0	León	36,210	Toluca	0–1	Juárez	9,211
16	UANL	0–2	América	38,810	Juárez	0–2	Mazatlán	7,688
17	América	0–0	Cruz Azul	52,630	Atlético San Luis	1–3	Santos Laguna	10,364

Source: Liga MX

1. Does not include matches played behind closed doors.

=== Riot ===
On 5 March 2022, during a Round 9 match between Queretaro and Atlas, a riot broke out in the stands at Estadio Corregidora resulting in 26 injuries. As a result, Liga MX President Mikel Arriola announced that all remaining league matches scheduled for that week were postponed. One Liga de Expansión MX match and five Liga MX Femenil matches scheduled for that week were also postponed.

=== Final phase ===
==== Reclassification ====
Team 1	Score	Team 2
Puebla	2–2 (3–1 p)	Mazatlán
Guadalajara	4–1	UNAM
Monterrey	2–2 (1–3 p)	Atlético San Luis
Cruz Azul	1–1 (3–1 p)	Necaxa

- All games were played in a single-leg hosted by the higher seed.
- If a game ended in a draw, it proceeded directly to a penalty shoot-out.

==== Bracket ====
Quarter-finals
1	Pachuca	2	3	5
8	Atlético San Luis	2	2	4
4	América	1	3	4
5	Puebla	1	2	3
2	UANL (s)	1	0	1
7	Cruz Azul	0	1	1
3	Atlas	2	1	3
6	Guadalajara	1	1	2

Semi-finals
1	Pachuca	1	3	4
4	América	1	0	1
2	UANL	0	0	0
3	Atlas	3	2	5

Finals
1	Pachuca	0	2	2
3	Atlas	2	1	3

- Teams were re-seeded each round.
- The winners of the Reclassification matches were seeded based on their ranking in the classification table.
- Team with more goals on aggregate after two matches advanced.
- No away goals rule is applied in neither round, if the two teams were tied on aggregate, the higher seeded team advanced.
- In the final, if the two teams were tied after both legs, the match went to extra time and, if necessary, a shoot-out.
- Both finalists qualified to the 2023 CONCACAF Champions League.

==== Quarterfinals ====
Team 1	Agg.	Team 2	1st leg	2nd leg
Atlético San Luis	4–5	Pachuca	2–2	2–3
Cruz Azul	1–1 (s)	UANL	0–1	1–0
Guadalajara	2–3	Atlas	1–2	1–1
Puebla	3–4	América	1–1	2–3

==== Semifinals ====
Team 1	Agg.	Team 2	1st leg	2nd leg
América	1–4	Pachuca	1–1	0–3
Atlas	5–0	UANL	3–0	2–0

==== Finals ====
Team 1	Agg.	Team 2	1st leg	2nd leg
Atlas	3–2	Pachuca	2–0	1–2

== Awards ==
Award	Winner	Club
Balón de Oro	(Colombia) Camilo Vargas	Atlas
Best Goalkeeper	(Colombia) Camilo Vargas	Atlas
Best center-back	(Argentina) Hugo Nervo	Atlas
Best full-back	(Mexico) Kevin Álvarez	Pachuca
Best defensive midfielder	(Mexico) Aldo Rocha	Atlas
Best offensive midfielder	(Colombia) Julián Quiñones	Atlas
Best Forward	(France) André-Pierre Gignac	UANL
Top Goalscorer of the Season	(Argentina) Germán Berterame (16 goals)	Atlético San Luis
Rookie of the Year	(Mexico) Jordan Carrillo	Santos Laguna
Manager of the Year	(Argentina) Diego Cocca	Atlas
Best Goal	(Paraguay) Juan Escobar	Cruz Azul

== Coefficient table ==
As of the 2020–21 season, the promotion and relegation between Liga MX and Liga de Expansión MX (formerly known as Ascenso MX) was suspended, however, the coefficient table will be used to establish the payment of fines that will be used for the development of the clubs of the silver circuit.

Per Article 24 of the competition regulations, the payment of $MXN160 million will be distributed among the last three positioned in the coefficient table as follows: 80 million in the last place; 47 million the penultimate; and 33 million will be paid by the sixteenth team in the table, as of the 2021–22 season the remaining $MXN80 million will be paid through the financial remnants generated by the Liga MX itself. The team that finishes last on the table will start the following season with a coefficient of zero. If the last ranked team, which was Atlético San Luis, repeats as the last ranked team in the 2021–22 season coefficient table, they will be fined an additional $MXN20 million.

Pos	Team	'19 A Pts	'20 C Pts	'20 G Pts	'21 G Pts	'21 A Pts	'22 C Pts	Total Pts	Total Pld	Avg	GD	Fine
1	América	31	34	32	38	35	26	196	103	1.9029	+49	Safe from paying any fine
2	León	33	29	40	26	29	21	178	103	1.7282	+40	Safe from paying any fine
3	Cruz Azul	23	35	29	41	23	25	176	103	1.7087	+40	Safe from paying any fine
4	UANL	32	28	28	23	28	33	172	103	1.6699	+47	Safe from paying any fine
5	Santos Laguna	37	29	25	26	24	20	161	103	1.5631	+31	Safe from paying any fine
6	Pachuca	25	22	25	23	18	38	151	103	1.4660	+23	Safe from paying any fine
7	UNAM	23	34	32	18	21	22	150	103	1.4563	+9	Safe from paying any fine
8	Guadalajara	25	25	26	23	22	26	147	103	1.4272	+9	Safe from paying any fine
9	Monterrey	27	14	29	28	22	26	146	103	1.4175	+18	Safe from paying any fine
10	Puebla	17	25	20	28	24	26	140	103	1.3592	+3	Safe from paying any fine
11	Atlas	21	16	14	25	29	27	132	103	1.2816	+1	Safe from paying any fine
12	Atlético San Luis	0	0	0	0	20	23	43	34	1.2647	–5	Safe from paying any fine
13	Necaxa	31	14	24	11	20	23	123	103	1.1942	–14	Safe from paying any fine
14	Mazatlán	27	18	16	21	20	21	123	103	1.1942	–18	Safe from paying any fine
15	Querétaro	31	24	13	21	15	17	121	103	1.1748	–12	Safe from paying any fine
16	Toluca (F)	17	17	21	22	23	19	120	103	1.1650	–30	$MXN33 million
17	Tijuana (F)	24	16	15	20	15	17	107	103	1.0388	–56	$MXN47 million
18	Juárez (F)	18	21	19	15	16	11	100	103	0.9709	–56	$MXN80 million

Rules for fine payment: 1) Fine coefficient; 2) Goal difference; 3) Number of goals scored; 4) Head-to-head results between tied teams; 5) Number of goals scored away; 6) Fair Play points
F = Team will have to pay fine indicated
Source: Liga MX

1. 2019–20 points were accumulated as Monarcas Morelia.
2. 2019–20 and 2020–21 accumulated points are not counted towards their relegation coefficient.

== Aggregate table ==
The aggregate table (the sum of points of both the Apertura 2021 and Clausura 2022 tournaments) was being used to determine the participants in the 2022 Leagues Cup. On 15 April 2022, it was announced the tournament was cancelled due to fixture congestion from the 2022 FIFA World Cup.

Pos	Team	Pld	W	D	L	GF	GA	GD	Pts	Qualification or relegation
1	UANL	34	17	10	7	56	34	+22	61	CONCACAF Champions League
2	América	34	17	10	7	45	27	+18	61	
3	Atlas (C, A, X)	34	15	11	8	42	25	+17	56 (Note: The match between Querétaro and Atlas was stopped in the 60th minute, with the score Querétaro 0–1 Atlas, after a brawl broke out in the stands between fans and a subsequent pitch invasion. As a result, Atlas was given a 0–3 victory.)	CONCACAF Champions League
4	Pachuca	34	16	8	10	49	36	+13	56	CONCACAF Champions League
5	Puebla	34	13	11	10	41	35	+6	50	
6	León	34	13	11	10	37	36	+1	50	CONCACAF Champions League
7	Cruz Azul	34	12	12	10	41	34	+7	48	
8	Monterrey	34	12	12	10	40	33	+7	48	
9	Guadalajara	34	12	12	10	38	34	+4	48	
10	Santos Laguna	34	10	14	10	48	41	+7	44	
11	UNAM	34	11	10	13	41	44	−3	43	
12	Atlético San Luis	34	11	10	13	40	45	−5	43	
13	Necaxa	34	13	4	17	37	43	−6	43	
14	Toluca	34	11	10	13	43	58	−15	43	
15	Mazatlán	34	11	8	15	38	48	−10	41	
16	Querétaro	34	6	14	14	29	40	−11	32	
17	Tijuana	34	7	11	16	30	53	−23	32	
18	Juárez	34	7	6	21	24	53	−29	27	

Source: Liga MX
Rules for classification: 1) Points; 2) Goal difference; 3) Number of goals scored; 4) Head-to-head results between tied teams; 5) Number of goals scored away; 6) Highest relegation coefficient; 7) Fair Play points
(A) Apertura champion; (C) Champions; (X) Clausura champion

== Number of clubs by state ==
Rank	State	Number	Teams
1	Mexico City	3	América, Cruz Azul, and UNAM
3	Jalisco	2	Atlas and Guadalajara
3	Nuevo León	2	Monterrey and UANL
14	Aguascalientes	1	Necaxa
14	Baja California	1	Tijuana
14	(Chihuahua (state)) Chihuahua	1	Juárez
14	Coahuila	1	Santos Laguna
14	Guanajuato	1	León
14	(Hidalgo (state)) Hidalgo	1	Pachuca
14	Puebla	1	Puebla
14	Querétaro	1	Querétaro
14	San Luis Potosí	1	Atlético San Luis
14	Sinaloa	1	Mazatlán
14	State of Mexico	1	Toluca

== See also ==
- 2021–22 Liga de Expansión MX season
- 2021–22 Liga MX Femenil season
- 2021 MLS All-Star Game
