= 2019–20 Toluca FC season =

Toluca
2019–20 season
- Chairman: Francisco Suinaga
- Manager: Ricardo La Volpe (until 11 November); José Manuel de la Torre (from 2 December)
- Stadium: Estadio Nemesio Díez
- Apertura: 17th
- Top goalscorer: League: Emmanuel Gigliotti (3 goals); All: Emmanuel Gigliotti (4 goals)
- Highest home attendance: 25,744 (vs América, 11 August 2019)
- Lowest home attendance: 12,533 (vs Puebla, 6 October 2019)
- Average home league attendance: 16,242
- Biggest win: Oaxaca 1–4 Toluca (7 September 2019)
- Biggest defeat: León 4–0 Toluca (9 November 2019)
Home colours	Away colours	Third colours
- All statistics correct as of 26 November 2019.

The 2019–20 Deportivo Toluca F.C. season is the 103rd season in the football club's history and the 67th consecutive season in the top flight of Mexican football.

== Coaching staff ==
Position	Name
Head coach	(Argentina) Ricardo La Volpe
Assistant coaches	(Mexico) Rafael García
Assistant coaches	(Mexico) Martín Salcedo
Fitness coaches	(Argentina) Hernán Puerta
Fitness coaches	(Mexico) Hugo Carbajal
Kinesiologist	(Argentina) Fernando Giusiano
Doctor	(Mexico) José Serrano

== Players ==
=== Torneo Apertura ===
No.	Pos.	Nat.	Name	Date of birth (age)	Since
1	GK	(Mexico)	Alfredo Talavera (Captain)	18 September 1986 (aged 32)	2009
2	DF	(Argentina)	Fernando Tobio	18 October 1989 (aged 29)	2018
4	DF	(Mexico)	Adrián Mora	15 August 1997 (aged 21)	2018
5	DF	(Argentina)	Jonatan Maidana	29 July 1985 (aged 33)	2019 (Winter)
6	DF	(Ecuador)	Aníbal Chalá	9 May 1996 (aged 23)	2019
7	MF	(Mexico)	Alan Medina	19 August 1997 (aged 21)	2017
8	MF	(Brazil)	William da Silva	20 November 1986 (aged 32)	2018
9	FW	(Argentina)	Emmanuel Gigliotti	20 May 1987 (aged 32)	2019 (Winter)
10	MF	(Brazil)	Diego Rigonato	9 March 1988 (aged 31)	2019
11	MF	(Argentina)	Federico Mancuello	26 March 1989 (aged 30)	2019 (Winter)
12	GK	(Mexico)	Ramón Pasquel	22 June 1996 (aged 23)	2017
15	MF	(Mexico)	Antonio Ríos	24 October 1988 (aged 30)	2008
17	MF	(Colombia)	Felipe Pardo	17 August 1990 (aged 28)	2019 (Winter)
22	GK	(Mexico)	Luis Manuel García	31 December 1992 (aged 26)	2016
23	DF	(Mexico)	Richard Ruíz	14 January 1986 (aged 33)	2018
24	MF	(Mexico)	Ricardo Cruz	30 August 1997 (aged 21)	2018 (Winter)
25	FW	(Argentina)	Alexis Canelo	23 February 1992 (aged 27)	2017 (Winter)
26	DF	(Argentina)	Gastón Sauro	23 February 1990 (aged 29)	2019
24	MF	(Mexico)	Víctor Jaramillo	12 November 1998 (aged 20)	2019
29	DF	(Mexico)	Rodrigo Salinas	9 May 1988 (aged 31)	2017 (Winter)
30	DF	(Mexico)	Luis Hernández	2 February 1998 (aged 21)	2019

Players and squad numbers last updated on 3 December 2019.
Note: Flags indicate national team as has been defined under FIFA eligibility rules. Players may hold more than one non-FIFA nationality.
Ordered by squad number.

== Transfers ==
=== In ===
N	Pos.	Nat.	Name	Age	Moving from	Type	Transfer window	Source
6	DF	(Ecuador)	Aníbal Chalá	9 May 1996 (aged 23)	(Ecuador) LDU Quito	Transfer	Summer	
10	MF	(Brazil)	Diego Rigonato	9 March 1988 (aged 31)	(United Arab Emirates) Al Dhafra	Transfer	Summer	
26	DF	(Argentina)	Gastón Sauro	23 February 1990 (aged 29)	(United States) Columbus Crew	Transfer	Summer	
30	DF	(Mexico)	Luis Hernández	2 February 1998 (aged 21)	Necaxa	Transfer	Summer	
–	MF	(Uruguay)	Leonardo Fernández	8 November 1998 (aged 21)	Universidad de Chile	Loan	Winter	
–	FW	(Mexico)	Carlos Cisneros	30 August 1993 (aged 26)	Guadalajara	Transfer	Winter	
–	FW	(Ecuador)	Michael Estrada	7 April 1996 (aged 23)	(Ecuador) Macará	Transfer	Winter	
–	MF	(Mexico)	Javier Güemez	17 October 1991 (aged 28)	Querétaro	Transfer	Winter	

=== Out ===
N	Pos.	Nat.	Name	Age	Moving to	Type	Transfer window	Source
4	DF	(Chile)	Osvaldo González	10 August 1984 (aged 34)	Universidad de Chile	Transfer	Summer	
7	FW	(Mexico)	Luis Ángel Mendoza	3 February 1990 (aged 29)	Morelia	Transfer	Summer	
10	MF	(Mexico)	Leonel López	24 May 1994 (aged 25)	América	Transfer	Summer	
11	FW	(Mexico)	Carlos Esquivel	10 April 1982 (aged 37)	UAEM	Transfer	Summer	
13	DF	(Mexico)	Héctor Acosta	24 November 1991 (aged 27)	Venados	Transfer	Summer	
21	FW	(Argentina)	Enrique Triverio	31 December 1988 (aged 30)	Querétaro	Transfer	Summer	
24	MF	(Argentina)	Pablo Barrientos	17 January 1985 (aged 34)	(Uruguay) Nacional	Transfer	Summer	

== Competitions ==
=== Overview ===
Competition	First match	Last match	Starting round	Final position	Record							
Competition	First match	Last match	Starting round	Final position	Pld	W	D	L	GF	GA	GD	Win %
Torneo Apertura	21 July 2019	24 November 2019	Matchday 1	17th	18	4	5	9	16	26	−10	22.22
Copa MX	31 July 2019		Group stage		4	4	0	0	8	1	+7	100.00
Torneo Clausura			Matchday 1		0	0	0	0	0	0	+0	—
Total					22	8	5	9	24	27	−3	36.36

Last updated: 26 November 2019
Source: Mediotiempo.com

=== Torneo Apertura ===
==== League table ====
Pos	Team	Pld	W	D	L	GF	GA	GD	Pts	Qualification or relegation
15	Atlético San Luis	18	6	2	10	22	31	−9	20	
16	Juárez	18	5	3	10	17	27	−10	18	
17	Toluca	18	4	5	9	16	26	−10	17	
18	Puebla	18	4	5	9	20	31	−11	17	
19	Veracruz (Note: Veracuz were disaffiliated by the Mexican Football Federation following various financial problems and incidents off the field. As a result, no club was relegated after the Clausura 2020. Relegation was originally intended to resume at the end of the 2020–21 season, however it was suspended for at least five years after the Ascenso MX was folded.) (D)	18	1	5	12	11	45	−34	8	Team disaffiliated by the FMF

Source: Liga MX
Rules for classification: 1) Points; 2) Goal difference; 3) Number of goals scored; 4) Head-to-head results between tied teams; 5) Number of goals scored away; 6) Highest relegation coefficient; 7) Fair Play points
(D) Disaffiliated

==== Results summary ====
Overall								Home						Away					
Pld	W	D	L	GF	GA	GD	Pts	W	D	L	GF	GA	GD	W	D	L	GF	GA	GD
18	4	5	9	16	26	−10	17	3	2	4	11	12	−1	1	3	5	5	14	−9

Last updated: 26 November 2019.
Source: LigaMX

==== Result round by round ====
Round	1	2	3	4	5	6	7	8	9	10	11	12	13	14	15	16	17	18	19
Ground	H	A	A	H	A	H	A	A	H	A	H	A	H	†	H	A	H	A	H
Result	L	D	L	L	L	W	D	L	L	W	W	D	D	†	W	L	L	L	D
Position	17	14	18	18	17	16	16	18	18	17	16	15	15	16	15	15	17	17	17

Updated to match(es) played on 24 November 2019. Source: Mediotiempo.com
A = Away; H = Home; W = Win; D = Draw; L = Loss
Notes: † indicates team had a bye week

==== Matches ====
21 July 2019 1	Toluca	0–2	Querétaro	Toluca
12:00		Report	Castillo 65'; Escoboza 71'	Stadium: Estadio Nemesio Díez; Attendance: 13,015; Referee: Marco Antonio Ortiz Nava

27 July 2019 2	Cruz Azul	1–1	Toluca	Mexico City
21:00	Rodríguez 47'	Report	Medina 90+1'	Stadium: Estadio Azteca; Attendance: 25,320; Referee: Diego Montaño

4 August 2019 3	Juárez	2–0	Toluca	Ciudad Juárez
19:00	Fernández 16'; Sagal 49'	Report		Stadium: Estadio Olímpico Benito Juárez; Attendance: 25,320; Referee: Fernando Hernández

11 August 2019 4	Toluca	0–1	América	Toluca
12:00		Report	Ibarra 62'	Stadium: Estadio Nemesio Díez; Attendance: 25,744; Referee: Jorge Isaac Rojas

17 August 2019 5	Monterrey	2–0	Toluca	Guadalupe
21:06	Layún 21'; Sánchez 54'	Report		Stadium: Estadio BBVA Bancomer; Attendance: 39,783; Referee: Oscar Mejía

25 August 2019 6	Toluca	2–0	Tijuana	Toluca
12:00	Braghieri 7' (o.g.); Canelo 77'	Report		Stadium: Estadio Nemesio Díez; Attendance: 15,084; Referee: Luis Enrique Santander

28 August 2019 7	Necaxa	1–1	Toluca	Aguascalientes City
21:00	Quiroga 12'	Report	Gigliotti 37'	Stadium: Estadio Victoria; Attendance: 12,716; Referee: César Arturo Ramos

1 September 2019 8	UNAM	2–1	Toluca	Mexico City
12:00	González 55'; Mendoza 90+3'	Report	Gigliotti 90+2'	Stadium: Estadio Olímpico Universitario; Attendance: 20,032; Referee: Fernando Hernández

15 September 2019 9	Toluca	0–2	Morelia	Toluca
12:00		Report	Mendoza 71'; Aristeguieta 77'	Stadium: Estadio Nemesio Díez; Attendance: 15,226; Referee: Fernando Guerrero

20 September 2019 10	Atlas	0–1	Toluca	Guadalajara
21:00		Report	William 40'	Stadium: Estadio Jalisco; Attendance: 19,725; Referee: Jorge Isaac Rojas

26 September 2019 11	Toluca	3–1	Atlético San Luis	Toluca
20:00	Maidana 44'; Canelo 68'; Pardo 77'	Report	Ibáñez 90'	Stadium: Estadio Nemesio Díez; Attendance: 13,535; Referee: César Arturo Ramos

29 September 2019 12	Veracruz	1–1	Toluca	Boca del Río
19:00	Carrasco 73'	Report	Castañeda 90+3'	Stadium: Estadio Luis "Pirata" Fuente; Attendance: 8,698; Referee: Luis Enrique Santander

6 October 2019 13	Toluca	1–1	Puebla	Toluca
12:00	Maidana 85'	Report	Acosta 48'	Stadium: Estadio Nemesio Díez; Attendance: 12,533; Referee: Adonai Escobedo

27 October 2019 15	Toluca	2–0	Pachuca	Toluca
12:00	Hernández 51'; Pardo 84'	Report		Stadium: Estadio Nemesio Díez; Attendance: 14,096; Referee: Roberto García Orozco

30 October 2019 16	UANL	1–0	Toluca	San Nicolás de los Garza
21:00	Salcedo 82'	Report		Stadium: Estadio Universitario; Attendance: 37,653; Referee: Eduardo Galván

3 November 2019 17	Toluca	1–3	Guadalajara	Toluca
12:00	Pardo 12'	Report	López 32'; Pulido 36', 76'	Stadium: Estadio Nemesio Díez; Attendance: 23,153; Referee: Fernando Guerrero

9 November 2019 18	León	4–0	Toluca	León
21:00	Meneses 21'; Moreno 61'; Ochoa 69'; Macías 81'	Report		Stadium: Estadio León; Attendance: 20,324; Referee: Marco Antonio Ortiz Nava

24 November 2019 19	Toluca	2–2	Santos Laguna	Toluca
12:00	Gigliotti 15'; William 30'	Report	Valdés 9'; Games 36'	Stadium: Estadio Nemesio Díez; Attendance: 13,829; Referee: Fernando Hernández

=== Copa MX ===
==== Group stage ====
Pos	Team	Pld	W	D	L	GF	GA	GD	Pts	Qualification
1	Toluca	4	4	0	0	8	1	+7	12	Advance to knockout stage
2	Veracruz	4	1	1	2	2	4	−2	4	
3	Oaxaca	4	0	1	3	2	7	−5	1	

Source: Copa MX
Rules for classification: Tiebreakers

31 July 2019 1	Toluca	1–0	Oaxaca	Toluca
19:00	Aguayo 9' (o.g.)	Report		Stadium: Estadio Nemesio Díez; Attendance: 15,200; Referee: Víctor Cáceres

7 September 2019 2	Oaxaca	1–4	Toluca	Oaxaca City
19:00	Marín 43'	Report	Gigliotti 24'; Chalá 44'; Castañeda 44'; Millán 44'	Stadium: Estadio Tecnológico de Oaxaca; Referee: Luis Daniel Chávez

2 October 2019 3	Toluca	2–0	Veracruz	Toluca
18:10	Castañeda 55'; Canelo 90+4'	Report		Stadium: Estadio Nemesio Díez; Attendance: 15,611; Referee: Oscar Macías Romo

12 October 2019 4	Veracruz	0–1	Toluca	Boca del Río
21:00		Report	William 70'	Stadium: Estadio Luis "Pirata" Fuente; Attendance: 3,229; Referee: Edgar Ulises Rangel

== Statistics ==
=== Squad statistics ===
No.	Pos	Nat	Player	Total		Apertura		Copa MX		Clausura	
No.	Pos	Nat	Player	Apps	Goals	Apps	Goals	Apps	Goals	Apps	Goals
1	GK	(Mexico)	Alfredo Talavera	18	0	18	0	0	0	0	0
2	DF	(Argentina)	Fernando Tobio	16	0	13	0	3	0	0	0
4	DF	(Mexico)	Adrián Mora	8	0	7	0	1	0	0	0
5	DF	(Argentina)	Jonatan Maidana	17	2	15	2	2	0	0	0
6	DF	(Ecuador)	Aníbal Chalá	18	1	16	0	2	1	0	0
7	MF	(Mexico)	Alan Medina	6	1	5	1	1	0	0	0
8	MF	(Brazil)	William da Silva	18	3	17	2	1	1	0	0
9	FW	(Argentina)	Emmanuel Gigliotti	17	4	13	3	4	1	0	0
10	MF	(Brazil)	Diego Rigonato	14	0	13	0	1	0	0	0
11	MF	(Argentina)	Federico Mancuello	17	0	13	0	4	0	0	0
15	MF	(Mexico)	Antonio Ríos	14	0	11	0	3	0	0	0
17	MF	(Colombia)	Felipe Pardo	18	3	17	3	1	0	0	0
22	GK	(Mexico)	Luis García	4	0	0	0	4	0	0	0
23	DF	(Mexico)	Richard Ruíz	18	0	15	0	3	0	0	0
24	MF	(Mexico)	Ricardo Cruz	5	0	4	0	1	0	0	0
25	FW	(Argentina)	Alexis Canelo	21	3	17	2	4	1	0	0
26	DF	(Argentina)	Gastón Sauro	12	0	9	0	3	0	0	0
28	MF	(Mexico)	Víctor Jaramillo	1	0	0	0	1	0	0	0
29	DF	(Mexico)	Rodrigo Salinas	13	0	11	0	2	0	0	0
30	DF	(Mexico)	Luis Hernández	16	1	14	1	2	0	0	0
187	FW	(Mexico)	Oscar Millán	10	1	6	0	4	1	0	0
190	FW	(Mexico)	Giovanny León	14	0	10	0	4	0	0	0
197	MF	(Mexico)	Kevin Castañeda	9	3	5	1	4	2	0	0
199	FW	(Mexico)	Juan de Dios Gamboa	3	0	2	0	1	0	0	0

Last updated: 26 November 2019
Source: Mediotiempo.com

=== Goals ===
As of 26 November 2019

Rank	Player	Position	Apertura	Copa MX	Clausura	Total
1	(Argentina) Emmanuel Gigliotti	FW	3	1	0	4
2	(Argentina) Alexis Canelo	FW	2	1	0	3
2	(Mexico) Kevin Castañeda	MF	1	2	0	3
2	(Brazil) William da Silva	MF	2	1	0	3
2	(Colombia) Felipe Pardo	MF	3	0	0	3
6	(Argentina) Jonatan Maidana	DF	2	0	0	2
7	(Ecuador) Aníbal Chalá	DF	0	1	0	1
7	(Mexico) Luis Hernández	DF	1	0	0	1
7	(Mexico) Alan Medina	MF	1	0	0	1
7	(Mexico) Oscar Millán	FW	0	1	0	1
Own goals			1	1	0	2
Total			16	8	0	24

=== Clean sheets ===
As of 26 November 2019

Rank	Name	Apertura	Copa MX	Clausura	Total
1	(Mexico) Luis García	0	3	0	3
2	(Mexico) Alfredo Talavera	3	0	0	3
Total		3	3	0	6

=== Disciplinary record ===
N	P	Nat.	Name	Apertura			Copa MX			Total			Notes
N	P	Nat.	Name	Yellow card	Second yellow card	Red card	Yellow card	Second yellow card	Red card	Yellow card	Second yellow card	Red card	Notes
25	FW	(Argentina)	Alexis Canelo	2		1	2			4		1	
29	DF	(Mexico)	Rodrigo Salinas			1	1			1		1	
26	DF	(Argentina)	Gastón Sauro	2	1		2			4	1		
5	DF	(Argentina)	Jonatan Maidana	4	1					4	1		
30	DF	(Mexico)	Luis Hernández	4			1			5			
8	MF	(Brazil)	William da Silva	5						5			
17	MF	(Colombia)	Felipe Pardo	4						4			
23	DF	(Mexico)	Richard Ruíz	2			1			3			
2	DF	(Argentina)	Fernando Tobio	2						2			
11	MF	(Argentina)	Federico Mancuello	1			1			2			
10	MF	(Brazil)	Diego Rigonato	2						2			
1	GK	(Mexico)	Alfredo Talavera	2						2			
15	MF	(Mexico)	Antonio Ríos	2						2			
4	DF	(Mexico)	Adrián Mora	2						2			
6	DF	(Ecuador)	Aníbal Chalá	1						1			
199	FW	(Mexico)	Juan de Dios Gamboa	1						1			
24	MF	(Mexico)	Ricardo Cruz				1			1			
187	FW	(Mexico)	Oscar Millán	1						1			

Last updated: 26 November 2019
Source: LigaMX
Only competitive matches
(yellow card) = Number of bookings; (second yellow card) = Number of sending offs after a second yellow card; (red card) = Number of sending offs by a direct red card.
