= 2018–19 Toluca FC season =

Toluca
2018–19 season
- Chairman: Francisco Suinaga
- Manager: Hernán Cristante (until 25 February); José Luis Real (caretaker) (until 3 March); Ricardo La Volpe (from 4 March)
- Stadium: Estadio Nemesio Díez
- Apertura: 7th Playoffs: Quarterfinals
- Clausura: 9th
- Apertura Copa MX: Group stage
- CONCACAF Champions League: Round of 16
- Top goalscorer: League: Alexis Vega (6 goals); All: Alexis Vega (6 goals)
- Highest home attendance: 30,000 (vs UNAM, 11 November 2018)
- Lowest home attendance: 7,845 (vs Tijuana, 5 September 2018)
- Average home league attendance: 17,667
- Biggest win: Toluca 4–0 Querétaro (28 October 2018)
- Biggest defeat: Santos Laguna 4–0 Toluca (24 February 2019)
Home colours	Away colours	Third colours
- All statistics correct as of 28 February 2019.

The 2018–19 Deportivo Toluca F.C. season was the 102nd season in the football club's history and the 66th consecutive season in the top flight of Mexican football.

== Coaching staff ==
Position	Name
Head coach	(Argentina) Hernán Cristante
Assistant coaches	(Mexico) Oscar Velázquez
Assistant coaches	(Argentina) Ernesto Corti
Assistant coaches	(Argentina) Pablo Morant
Fitness coaches	(Argentina) Mariano Filippi
Fitness coaches	(Mexico) Osvaldo Scansetti
Kinesiologists	(Argentina) Mariano Morand
Kinesiologists	(Mexico) Raúl Curiel
Masseurs	(Mexico) Adrián Sánchez
Masseurs	(Mexico) Alfredo Morales
Doctors	(Mexico) José Serrano
Doctors	(Mexico) Rodrigo López

== Players ==
=== Squad information ===
No.	Pos.	Nat.	Name	Date of birth (age)	Signed in	Previous club
Goalkeepers
1	GK	(Mexico)	Alfredo Talavera (VC)	18 September 1986 (aged 31)	2009	(Mexico) Guadalajara
12	GK	(Mexico)	Ramón Pasquel	22 June 1996 (aged 22)	2017	(Mexico) Youth System
22	GK	(Mexico)	Luis Manuel García	31 December 1992 (aged 25)	2016	(Mexico) Querétaro
Defenders
2	DF	(Argentina)	Fernando Tobio	18 October 1989 (aged 28)	2018	(Brazil) Palmeiras
3	DF	(Argentina)	Santiago García	8 July 1988 (aged 29)	2017	(Germany) Werder Bremen
4	DF	(Chile)	Osvaldo González	10 August 1984 (aged 33)	2016	Universidad de Chile
13	DF	(Mexico)	Héctor Acosta	24 November 1991 (aged 26)	2018	(Mexico) Atlético San Luis
17	DF	(Mexico)	Richard Ruíz	14 January 1986 (aged 32)	2018	(Mexico) Veracruz
29	DF	(Mexico)	Rodrigo Salinas	9 May 1988 (aged 30)	2017 (Winter)	(Mexico) Tijuana
33	DF	(Argentina)	Jonatan Maidana	29 July 1985 (aged 32)	2019 (Winter)	(Argentina) River Plate
84	DF	(Mexico)	Adrián Mora	15 August 1997 (aged 20)	2018	(Mexico) Youth System
Midfielders
8	MF	(Brazil)	William da Silva	20 November 1986 (aged 31)	2018	(Mexico) América
10	MF	(Mexico)	Leonel López	24 May 1994 (aged 24)	2019 (Winter)	(Mexico) León
15	MF	(Mexico)	Antonio Ríos (Captain)	24 October 1988 (aged 29)	2008	(Mexico) Youth System
16	MF	(Mexico)	Adolfo Domínguez	10 February 1991 (aged 27)	2018	(Mexico) Tapachula
19	MF	(Colombia)	Felipe Pardo	17 August 1990 (aged 27)	2019 (Winter)	(Greece) Olympiacos
20	MF	(Argentina)	Federico Mancuello	26 March 1989 (aged 29)	2019 (Winter)	(Brazil) Cruzeiro
24	MF	(Argentina)	Pablo Barrientos	17 January 1985 (aged 33)	2016 (Winter)	(Argentina) San Lorenzo
30	MF	(Mexico)	Alan Medina	19 August 1997 (aged 20)	2017	(Mexico) Youth System
Forwards
7	FW	(Mexico)	Luis Ángel Mendoza	3 February 1990 (aged 28)	2018	(Mexico) Tijuana
9	FW	(Argentina)	Emmanuel Gigliotti	20 May 1987 (aged 31)	2019 (Winter)	(Argentina) Independiente
11	FW	(Mexico)	Carlos Esquivel	10 April 1982 (aged 36)	2019	(Mexico) Veracruz
21	FW	(Argentina)	Enrique Triverio	31 December 1988 (aged 29)	2018	(Argentina) Racing
25	FW	(Argentina)	Alexis Canelo	23 February 1992 (aged 26)	2017 (Winter)	(Mexico) Puebla
31	FW	(Mexico)	Brian Rubio	9 November 1996 (aged 21)	2019 (Winter)	(Mexico) Youth System
289	FW	(Mexico)	Diego Abella	22 October 1998 (aged 19)	2019 (Winter)	(Mexico) Youth System

Players and squad numbers last updated on 13 January 2019.
Note: Flags indicate national team as has been defined under FIFA eligibility rules. Players may hold more than one non-FIFA nationality.

== Transfers ==
=== In ===
N	Pos.	Nat.	Name	Age	Moving from	Type	Transfer window	Source
2	DF	(Argentina)	Fernando Tobio	36	(Argentina) Rosario Central	Transfer	Summer	Marca
7	MF	(Mexico)	Luis Ángel Mendoza	36	Tijuana	Loan	Summer	
8	MF	(Brazil)	William da Silva	39	América	Transfer	Summer	Mediotiempo.com
11	FW	(Mexico)	Amaury Escoto	33	BUAP	Loan	Summer	
13	DF	(Mexico)	Héctor Acosta	34	Atlético San Luis	End of Loan	Summer	
16	MF	(Mexico)	Adolfo Domínguez	35	Tapachula	Loan	Summer	
17	DF	(Mexico)	Richard Ruíz	40	Veracruz	Transfer	Summer	
20	FW	(Uruguay)	Marcelo Cabrera	34	(Argentina) Argentinos Juniors	Transfer	Summer	
21	FW	(Argentina)	Enrique Triverio	37	(Argentina) Racing	Transfer	Summer	
9	FW	(Argentina)	Emmanuel Gigliotti	39	(Argentina) Independiente	Transfer	Winter	
10	MF	(Mexico)	Leonel López	32	León	End of Loan	Winter	
11	MF	(Mexico)	Carlos Esquivel	44	Veracruz	End of Loan	Winter	
19	MF	(Colombia)	Felipe Pardo	36	(Greece) Olympiacos	Transfer	Winter	
20	MF	(Argentina)	Federico Mancuello	37	(Brazil) Cruzeiro	Transfer	Winter	
33	DF	(Argentina)	Jonathan Maidana	41	(Argentina) River Plate	Transfer	Winter	

=== Out ===
N	Pos.	Nat.	Name	Age	Moving to	Type	Transfer window	Source
4	DF	(Uruguay)	Maximiliano Perg	35	Unattached	Released	Summer	Mediotiempo.com
6	DF	(Mexico)	Óscar Rojas	38	Unattached	Released	Summer	
7	FW	(Argentina)	Gabriel Hauche	39	(Colombia) Millonarios	Loan Return	Summer	Mediotiempo.com
10	MF	(Mexico)	Ángel Reyna	42	Celaya	Loan Return	Summer	Récord
13	DF	(Mexico)	Aldo Benítez	30	(Spain) Unión Adarve	Transfer	Summer	
16	GK	(Mexico)	Miguel Centeno	37	Unattached	Released	Summer	
17	MF	(Mexico)	Leonel López	32	León	Loan Return	Summer	
20	FW	(Colombia)	Fernando Uribe	38	(Brazil) Flamengo	Transfer	Summer	
27	DF	(Chile)	Fabián Monilla	28	(Chile) Malleco Unido	Loan Return	Summer	
28	DF	(Mexico)	Jorge Sartiaguin	33	Atlante	Loan	Summer	
31	FW	(Mexico)	Martín Abundis	30	Celaya	Loan	Summer	
32	MF	(Mexico)	Iván Zamora	30	Atlante	Loan	Summer	
34	DF	(United States)	Andy García	31	Real Zamora	Loan	Summer	
87	MF	(Mexico)	Michel Navarro	31	Real Zamora	Loan	Summer	
9	FW	(Mexico)	Alexis Vega	28	Guadalajara	Transfer	Winter	Récord
14	MF	(Argentina)	Rubens Sambueza	42	León	Transfer	Winter	
23	MF	(Colombia)	Luis Quiñones	35	UANL	Loan Return	Winter	
26	DF	(Colombia)	Cristian Borja	33	(Portugal) Sporting CP	Transfer	Winter	

== Competitions ==
=== Overview ===
Competition	First match	Last match	Starting round	Final position	Record							
Competition	First match	Last match	Starting round	Final position	Pld	W	D	L	GF	GA	GD	Win %
Torneo Apertura	22 July 2018	2 December 2018	Matchday 1	7th	19	8	3	8	31	27	+4	42.11
Apertura Copa MX	1 August 2018	5 September 2018	Group stage	Group stage	4	1	1	2	5	7	−2	25.00
Torneo Clausura	4 January 2019		Matchday 1		7	2	1	4	6	9	−3	28.57
CONCACAF Champions League			Round of 16		0	0	0	0	0	0	+0	—
Total					30	11	5	14	42	43	−1	36.67

Last updated: 17 February 2019
Source: Mediotiempo.com

=== Torneo Apertura ===
==== League table ====
Pos	Team	Pld	W	D	L	GF	GA	GD	Pts	Qualification or relegation
5	Monterrey	17	9	3	5	25	19	+6	30	Advance to Liguilla (Note: The first 8 places in the table qualified for the Liguilla. The last ranked team in the relegation table could qualify for the Liguilla in the Apertura tournament.)
6	Tigres	17	8	5	4	32	18	+14	29	Advance to Liguilla
7	Toluca	17	8	2	7	27	22	+5	26	Advance to Liguilla
8	Querétaro	17	7	5	5	19	20	−1	26	Advance to Liguilla
9	Morelia	17	7	4	6	23	26	−3	25	

Source: Liga MX
Rules for classification: 1) Points; 2) Goal difference; 3) Number of goals scored; 4) Head-to-head results between tied teams; 5) Number of goals scored away; 6) Highest relegation coefficient; 7) Fair Play points

==== Results summary ====
Overall								Home						Away					
Pld	W	D	L	GF	GA	GD	Pts	W	D	L	GF	GA	GD	W	D	L	GF	GA	GD
17	8	2	7	27	22	+5	26	6	1	2	19	9	+10	2	1	5	8	13	−5

Last updated: 26 November 2018.
Source: LigaMX

==== Result round by round ====
Round	1	2	3	4	5	6	7	8	9	10	11	12	13	14	15	16	17
Ground	H	A	H	A	H	A	H	H	A	H	A	H	A	H	A	H	A
Result	W	D	L	W	W	L	L	W	W	W	L	W	L	W	D	L	L
Position	4	7	8	6	6	7	8	8	5	3	6	5	6	5	5	7	7

Updated to match(es) played on 26 November 2018. Source: LigaMX
A = Away; H = Home; W = Win; D = Draw; L = Loss

==== Matches ====
22 July 2018 1	Toluca	2–0	Morelia	Toluca
12:00	Canelo 46'; Sambueza 90'	Report		Stadium: Nemesio Díez; Attendance: 16,703; Referee: José Alfredo Peñaloza

27 July 2018 2	Puebla	2–1	Toluca	Puebla
21:00	Arreola 12'; Torres 32'	Report	Sambueza 38'	Stadium: Cuauhtémoc; Attendance: 14,326; Referee: Jorge Antonio Pérez Durán

5 August 2018 3	Toluca	2–2	Guadalajara	Toluca
12:00	Vega 3'; Mendoza 69'	Report	Zaldívar 42' 50'	Stadium: Nemesio Díez; Attendance: 22,226; Referee: César Arturo Ramos

11 August 2018 4	UANL	1–2	Toluca	San Nicolás de los Garza
19:00	Gignac 14'	Report	Triverio 52'; da Silva 63'	Stadium: Universitario; Attendance: 41,379; Referee: Roberto García Orozco

19 August 2018 5	Toluca	3–0	Tijuana	Toluca
12:00	Triverio 25'; Ríos 34'; Vega 73'	Report		Stadium: Nemesio Díez; Attendance: 15,419; Referee: Fernando Guerrero Ramírez

22 August 2018 6	Cruz Azul	1–0	Toluca	Mexico City
19:00	Cauteruccio 34'	Report		Stadium: Azteca; Attendance: 31,120; Referee: Francisco Chacón

26 August 2018 7	Toluca	1–2	León	Toluca
16:00	Salinas 6'	Report	Aquino 15'; Boselli 45'	Stadium: Nemesio Díez; Attendance: 16,698; Referee: Diego Montaño Robles

2 September 2018 8	Toluca	2–1	Santos Laguna	Toluca
12:00	da Silva 13'; Sambueza 61'	Report	Furch 3'	Stadium: Nemesio Díez; Attendance: 15,621; Referee: Marco Antonio Ortiz Nava

14 September 2018 9	Veracruz	2–3	Toluca	Boca del Río
21:03	Chávez 52'; Luna 59'	Report	Quiñones 13'; Mora 40'; Sambueza 87'	Stadium: Luis "Pirata" Fuente; Attendance: 8,897; Referee: Luis Enrique Santander

22 September 2018 10	Toluca	3–2	Necaxa	Toluca
17:00	Salinas 50'; Quiñones 59'; Vega 79'	Report	Córdova 40'; Fernández 87'	Stadium: Nemesio Díez; Attendance: 15,705; Referee: Francisco Chacón

28 September 2018 11	Atlas	2–0	Toluca	Guadalajara
21:00	Duque 31'; Cardona 78'	Report		Stadium: Jalisco; Attendance: 15,441; Referee: Adonai Escobedo

7 October 2018 12	Toluca	2–1	Pachuca	Toluca
12:00	Canelo 3'; Quiñones 84'	Report	Ulloa 9'	Stadium: Nemesio Díez; Attendance: 16,383; Referee: Diego Montaño Robles

21 October 2018 13	Monterrey	2–1	Toluca	Guadalupe
20:06	Gallarado 72'; Lajud 84'	Report	González 49'	Stadium: BBVA Bancomer; Attendance: 29,444; Referee: Fernando Guerrero Ramírez

28 October 2018 14	Toluca	4–0	Querétaro	Toluca
16:00	Mendoza 13', 58'; González 52'; Vega 60'	Report		Stadium: Nemesio Díez; Attendance: 15,308; Referee: Marco Antonio Ortiz Nava

3 November 2018 15	América	1–1	Toluca	Mexico City
19:00	Martín 34'	Report	Vega 1'	Stadium: Azteca; Attendance: 29,635; Referee: Oscar Macías Romero

11 November 2018 16	Toluca	0–1	UNAM	Toluca
12:00		Report	González 32'	Stadium: Nemesio Díez; Attendance: 30,000; Referee: Fernando Guerrero Martínez

25 November 2018 17	BUAP	2–0	Toluca	Puebla
16:00	Chirinos 21'; Yago César 90'	Report		Stadium: Universitario BUAP; Attendance: 8,263; Referee: Francisco Chacón

===== Liguilla =====
====== Quarter-finals ======
29 November 2018 First leg	Toluca	2–2	América	Toluca
19:00	Tobio 23'; Vega 90+5'	Report	Aguilera 6'; Valdez 25'	Stadium: Nemesio Díez; Attendance: 26,031; Referee: Marco Antonio Ortiz Nava

2 December 2018 Second leg	América	3–2 (5–4 agg.)	Toluca	Mexico City
18:30	Martínez 3'; Valdez 23'; Aguilar 55'	Report	Sambueza 67'; da Silva 86'	Stadium: Estadio Azteca; Attendance: 44,118; Referee: César Arturo Ramos

=== Apertura Copa MX ===
==== Group stage ====
Pos	Team	Pld	W	D	L	GF	GA	GD	Pts	Qualification
1	Tijuana	4	2	1	1	5	2	+3	7	Advance to knockout stage
2	Juárez	4	1	2	1	6	7	−1	5	Advance to knockout stage
3	Toluca	4	1	1	2	5	7	−2	4	

Source: Copa MX
Rules for classification: Tiebreakers

1 August 2018 1	Toluca	2–3	Juárez	Toluca
21:00	Mendoza 15'; Castañeda 17'	Report	Carrijó 37'; Gómez 67'; Tobio 82' (o.g.)	Stadium: Nemesio Díez; Attendance: 17,272; Referee: Edgar Espadas Vallejo

8 August 2018 2	Tijuana	2–0	Toluca	Tijuana
19:00	Torres 4'; Bolaños 78'	Report		Stadium: Caliente; Attendance: 27,333; Referee: Eduardo Galván Basulto

29 August 2018 3	Juárez	2–2	Toluca	Ciudad Juárez
19:00	Carrijó 75' (pen.); Matheuzinho 83'	Report	Escoto 58', 90+4'	Stadium: Olímpico Benito Juárez; Attendance: 10,032; Referee: Juan Esquivel González

5 September 2018 4	Toluca	1–0	Tijuana	Toluca
21:00	Mora 27'	Report		Stadium: Nemesio Díez; Attendance: 7,845; Referee: Oscar Mejía

=== Torneo Clausura ===
==== League table ====
Pos	Team	Pld	W	D	L	GF	GA	GD	Pts	Qualification or relegation
7	Pachuca	17	8	4	5	32	26	+6	28	Advance to Liguilla (Note: The first 8 places in the table qualified for the Liguilla.)
8	Tijuana	17	9	1	7	25	20	+5	28	Advance to Liguilla
9	Toluca	17	7	4	6	28	23	+5	25	
10	Puebla	17	6	6	5	18	21	−3	24	
11	Santos Laguna	17	6	4	7	21	23	−2	22	

Source: Liga MX
Rules for classification: 1) Points; 2) Goal difference; 3) Number of goals scored; 4) Head-to-head results between tied teams; 5) Number of goals scored away; 6) Highest relegation coefficient; 7) Fair Play points

==== Results summary ====
Overall								Home						Away					
Pld	W	D	L	GF	GA	GD	Pts	W	D	L	GF	GA	GD	W	D	L	GF	GA	GD
5	2	0	3	5	5	0	6	1	0	1	2	1	+1	1	0	2	3	4	−1

Last updated: 4 February 2019.
Source: LigaMX

==== Result round by round ====
Round	1	2	3	4	5	6	7	8	9	10	11	12	13	14	15	16	17
Ground	A	H	A	H	A	H	A	A	H	A	H	A	H	A	H	A	H
Result	W	W	L	L	L												
Position	2	1	4	9	12												

Updated to match(es) played on 3 February 2019. Source: LigaMX
A = Away; H = Home; W = Win; D = Draw; L = Loss

==== Matches ====
4 January 2019 1	Morelia	1–3	Toluca	Morelia
19:00	Sandoval 15'	Report	Triverio 18', 42', 74'	Stadium: Estadio Morelos; Attendance: 22,889; Referee: Luis Enrique Santander

13 January 2019 2	Toluca	2–0	Puebla	Toluca
12:00	García 42'; Canelo 80'	Report		Stadium: Estadio Nemesio Díez; Attendance: 12,242; Referee: Diego Montaño

20 January 2019 3	Guadalajara	1–0	Toluca	Zapopan
18:30	Pulido 56'	Report		Stadium: Estadio Akron; Attendance: 31,718; Referee: Jorge Antonio Pérez Durán

27 January 2019 4	Toluca	0–1	UANL	Toluca
12:00		Report	Quiñones 43'	Stadium: Estadio Nemesio Díez; Attendance: 20,412; Referee: Jorge Isaac Rojas

2 February 2019 5	Tijuana	2–0	Toluca	Tijuana
19:00	Bolaños 14'; Castillo 68'	Report		Stadium: Estadio Caliente; Attendance: 10,329; Referee: Adonai Escobedo

10 February 2019 6	Toluca	1–1	Cruz Azul	Toluca
12:00	Mora 65'	Report	Pineda 26'	Stadium: Estadio Nemesio Díez; Attendance: 19,221; Referee: Francisco Chacón

16 February 2019 7	Léon	3–0	Toluca	León
19:00	Mena 68', 90+3'; Macías 76'	Report		Stadium: Estadio León; Attendance: 17,653; Referee: José Alfredo Peñaloza

24 February 2019 8	Santos Laguna	4–0	Toluca	Torreón
18:00	Valdés 5', 63'; Preciado 23'; Correa 39' (pen.)	Report	Mancuello (yellow card) 9'; S. García (red card) 33'; Mora (yellow card) 37'	Stadium: Estadio Corona; Attendance: 24,877; Referee: Luis Enrique Santander

3 March 2019 9	Toluca	3–1	Veracruz	Toluca
12:00	Barrientos 17'; Ríos 72'; Gigliotti 90+2'	Report	Kazim-Richards 44', (yellow card) 63' (yellow-red card) 65'	Stadium: Estadio Nemesio Díez; Referee: Fernando Guerrero Ramírez

9 March 2019 10	Necaxa	1–1	Toluca	Aguascalientes City
19:00	Alvarado (yellow card) 42'; Gallegos (yellow card) 54'; Contreras 66'; Marín (yellow card) 89'	Report	Mora (yellow card) 11'; Mendoza (yellow card) 25'; Gigliotti 47'; Ríos (yellow card) 83'	Stadium: Estadio Victoria; Referee: Eduardo Galvan Basulto

17 March 2019 11	Toluca	2–0	Atlas	Toluca
12:00	Medina 28'; Gigliotti (yellow card) 48'; Mancuello (yellow card) 72'; Tobio (yellow card) 88'; Salinas (yellow card) 89', (goal) 90+5'	Report	Segura (yellow card) 68'	Stadium: Estadio Nemesio Díez; Referee: César Arturo Ramos Palazuelos

30 March 2019 12	Pachuca	3–2	Toluca	Pachuca
19:00	Jara 4'; P. López 21'; Cardona 46'; Murillo (red card) 79'	Report	Tobio 27'; Barrientos 53'; Gigliotti (yellow card) 60'; García (yellow card) 84'; Salinas (yellow card) 90'	Stadium: Estadio Hidalgo; Referee: Jorge Isaac Rojas Castillo

7 April 2019 13	Toluca	5–1	Monterrey	Toluca
12:00	da Silva (yellow card) 3', (goal) 44'; Pardo (yellow card) 14', (goal) 63', 65'; Canelo 72'; Maidana (yellow card) 75'; Medina 82'	Report	Vásquez (yellow card) 38'; Medina (yellow card) 69'; Pizarro 71'; Vangioni (yellow card) 77'	Stadium: Estadio Nemesio Díez; Referee: Marco Antonio Ortiz Nava

13 April 2019 14	Querétaro	0–0	Toluca	Querétaro City
17:00	da Silva (yellow card) 49'; Gómez (yellow card) 62'	Report	Salinas (yellow card) 21'; Ruíz (red card) 60'	Stadium: Estadio Corregidora; Referee: Fernando Guerrero Ramírez

21 April 2019 15	Toluca	3–2	América	Toluca
12:00	Mancuello 4'; Maidana (yellow card) 46'; Pardo (yellow card) 53'; Canelo 71', 82'; Gigliotti (yellow card) 77'; Salinas (yellow card) 90+8'	Report	Martínez 35', (yellow card) 79'; Maidana 66' (o.g.)	Stadium: Estadio Nemesio Díez; Referee: Luis Enrique Santander Aguirre

28 April 2019 16	UNAM	v	Toluca	Mexico City
17:00		Report		Stadium: Estadio Olímpico Universitario

4 May 2019 17	Toluca	v	BUAP	Toluca
12:00		Report		Stadium: Estadio Nemesio Díez

=== CONCACAF Champions League ===
==== Round of 16 ====
21 February 2019 First leg	Sporting Kansas City (United States)	3–0	(Mexico) Toluca	Kansas City, United States
19:00	Németh 35' (Gerso); Gerso 52'; Ilie 72'; Sinovic (yellow card) 86'	Report	(yellow card) 39' Salinas; (yellow card) 83' González	Stadium: Children's Mercy Park; Attendance: 13,927; Referee: Henry Bejarano (Costa Rica)

28 February 2019 Second leg	Toluca (Mexico)	0–2 (0–5 agg.)	(United States) Sporting Kansas City	Toluca, Mexico
21:00		Report	Gerso 8'; Németh 62' (pen.)	Stadium: Nemesio Díez; Referee: Mario Escobar (Guatemala)

== Statistics ==
=== Squad statistics ===
No.	Pos	Nat	Player	Total		Apertura		Apertura Copa MX		Clausura		Concacaf CL	
No.	Pos	Nat	Player	Apps	Goals	Apps	Goals	Apps	Goals	Apps	Goals	Apps	Goals
1	GK	(Mexico)	Alfredo Talavera	21	0	13	0	1	0	7	0	0	0
2	DF	(Argentina)	Fernando Tobio	19	1	15	1	1	0	3	0	0	0
3	DF	(Argentina)	Santiago García	17	1	10	0	2	0	5	1	0	0
4	DF	(Chile)	Osvaldo González	23	2	16	2	2	0	5	0	0	0
7	FW	(Mexico)	Luis Ángel Mendoza	28	4	18	3	3	1	7	0	0	0
8	MF	(Brazil)	William da Silva	26	3	18	3	2	0	6	0	0	0
9	FW	(Argentina)	Emmanuel Gigliotti	4	0	0	0	0	0	4	0	0	0
10	MF	(Mexico)	Leonel López	2	0	0	0	0	0	2	0	0	0
11	FW	(Mexico)	Carlos Esquivel	3	0	0	0	0	0	3	0	0	0
13	DF	(Mexico)	Héctor Acosta	1	0	0	0	1	0	0	0	0	0
15	MF	(Mexico)	Antonio Ríos	26	1	18	1	1	0	7	0	0	0
16	MF	(Mexico)	Adolfo Domínguez	15	0	12	0	3	0	0	0	0	0
17	DF	(Mexico)	Richard Ruíz	5	0	0	0	4	0	1	0	0	0
19	FW	(Colombia)	Felipe Pardo	6	0	0	0	0	0	6	0	0	0
20	MF	(Argentina)	Federico Mancuello	2	0	0	0	0	0	2	0	0	0
21	FW	(Argentina)	Enrique Triverio	19	5	12	2	1	0	6	3	0	0
22	GK	(Mexico)	Luis Manuel García	10	0	7	0	3	0	0	0	0	0
23	MF	(Colombia)	Luis Enrique Quiñones	19	3	18	3	1	0	0	0	0	0
24	MF	(Argentina)	Pablo Barrientos	14	0	7	0	1	0	6	0	0	0
25	FW	(Argentina)	Alexis Canelo	17	3	11	2	3	0	3	1	0	0
29	DF	(Mexico)	Rodrigo Salinas	25	2	19	2	0	0	6	0	0	0
30	MF	(Mexico)	Alan Medina	4	0	0	0	1	0	3	0	0	0
33	DF	(Argentina)	Jonatan Maidana	4	0	0	0	0	0	4	0	0	0
82	DF	(Mexico)	Eduardo García	1	0	0	0	1	0	0	0	0	0
84	DF	(Mexico)	Adrián Mora	8	3	3	1	1	1	4	1	0	0
85	DF	(Mexico)	Diego Gallegos	3	0	0	0	3	0	0	0	0	0
289	FW	(Mexico)	Diego Abella	4	0	0	0	1	0	3	0	0	0
290	FW	(Mexico)	Giovanny León	5	0	2	0	3	0	0	0	0	0
295	MF	(Mexico)	Kevin Castañeda	3	2	1	1	2	1	0	0	0	0
306	MF	(Mexico)	Iván Acero	6	0	2	0	3	0	1	0	0	0
Players that left the club during the season
9	FW	(Mexico)	Alexis Vega	22	6	19	6	3	0	0	0	0	0
11	FW	(Mexico)	Amaury Escoto	11	2	8	0	3	2	0	0	0	0
14	MF	(Argentina)	Rubens Sambueza	12	5	12	5	0	0	0	0	0	0
20	FW	(Uruguay)	Marcelo Cabrera	9	0	5	0	4	0	0	0	0	0
26	DF	(Colombia)	Cristian Borja	19	0	17	0	1	0	1	0	0	0
33	DF	(Mexico)	Carlos Calvo	3	0	2	0	1	0	0	0	0	0

Last updated: 17 February 2019
Source: LigaMX

=== Goals ===
As of 17 February 2019

Rank	Player	Position	Apertura	Ap. Copa MX	Clausura	Concacaf CL	Total
1	(Mexico) Alexis Vega	FW	6	0	0	0	6
2	(Argentina) Rubens Sambueza	FW	5	0	0	0	5
2	(Argentina) Enrique Triverio	FW	2	0	3	0	5
4	(Mexico) Luis Ángel Mendoza	FW	3	1	0	0	4
5	(Argentina) Alexis Canelo	FW	2	0	1	0	3
5	(Brazil) William da Silva	MF	3	0	0	0	3
5	(Mexico) Adrián Mora	DF	1	1	1	0	3
5	(Colombia) Luis Quiñones	MF	3	0	0	0	3
8	(Chile) Osvaldo González	DF	2	0	0	0	2
8	(Mexico) Amaury Escoto	FW	0	2	0	0	2
8	(Mexico) Rodrigo Salinas	DF	2	0	0	0	2
12	(Mexico) Kevin Castañeda	MF	0	1	0	0	1
12	(Argentina) Santiago García	DF	0	0	1	0	1
12	(Mexico) Antonio Ríos	MF	1	0	0	0	1
12	(Mexico) Fernando Tobio	DF	1	0	0	0	1
Total			31	5	6	0	42

=== Hat-tricks ===
As of 22 January 2019

Player	Against	Result	Date	Competition
(Argentina) Enrique Triverio	Morelia	3–1 (A)	4 January 2019	Liga MX

=== Clean sheets ===
As of 28 January 2019

Rank	Name	Apertura	Apertura Copa MX	Clausura	Concacaf CL	Total
1	(Mexico) Alfredo Talavera	2	0	1	0	3
2	(Mexico) Luis Manuel García	1	1	0	0	2
Total		3	1	1	0	5

=== Disciplinary record ===
N	P	Nat.	Name	Apertura			Apertura Copa MX			Clausura			Concacaf CL			Total			Notes
N	P	Nat.	Name	Yellow card	Second yellow card	Red card	Yellow card	Second yellow card	Red card	Yellow card	Second yellow card	Red card	Yellow card	Second yellow card	Red card	Yellow card	Second yellow card	Red card	Notes
14	MF	(Argentina)	Rubens Sambueza	3		2										3		2	
29	DF	(Mexico)	Rodrigo Salinas	7		1				2						9		1	
4	DF	(Chile)	Osvaldo González	7					1							7		1	
23	MF	(Colombia)	Luis Quiñones	7					1							7		1	
8	MF	(Brazil)	William da Silva	3		1				4						7		1	
2	DF	(Argentina)	Fernando Tobio	3								1				3		1	
1	GK	(Mexico)	Alfredo Talavera	2		1										2		1	
21	FW	(Argentina)	Enrique Triverio	3	1		1									4	1		
3	DF	(Argentina)	Santiago García	6			1			2						9			
24	MF	(Argentina)	Pablo Barrientos	5												5			
15	MF	(Mexico)	Antonio Ríos	2						1	1					3	1		
16	MF	(Mexico)	Adolfo Domínguez	2			1									3			
26	DF	(Colombia)	Cristian Borja	3												3			
19	MF	(Colombia)	Felipe Pardo							3						3			
9	FW	(Mexico)	Alexis Vega	2												2			
33	DF	(Mexico)	Carlos Calvo				1									1			
295	MF	(Mexico)	Kevin Castañeda				1									1			
84	DF	(Mexico)	Adrián Mora				1									1			
306	MF	(Mexico)	Iván Acero				1									1			
22	GK	(Mexico)	Luis Manuel García	1												1			
7	FW	(Mexico)	Luis Ángel Mendoza	1												1			
17	FW	(Mexico)	Richard Ruíz							1						1			
289	FW	(Mexico)	Diego Abella							1						1			
9	FW	(Argentina)	Emmanuel Gigliotti							1						1			
33	DF	(Argentina)	Jonatan Maidana							1						1			

Last updated: 17 February 2019
Source: LigaMX
Ordered by (red card) , (second yellow card) and (yellow card)
(yellow card) = Number of bookings; (second yellow card) = Number of sending offs after a second yellow card; (red card) = Number of sending offs by a direct red card.

=== Attendance ===
Toluca's home attendance per round. Estadio Nemesio Díez has a capacity of 31,000 spectators.

Torneo Apertura
Rnd	Rival	Attendance	Percentage
1	Morelia	16,703	53.9%
3	Guadalajara	22,226	71.7%
5	Tijuana	15,419	49.8%
7	León	16,698	53.9%
8	Santos Laguna	15,621	50.4%
10	Necaxa	15,705	50.7%
12	Pachuca	16,383	52.8%
14	Querétaro	15,308	49.4%
16	UNAM	30,000	96.8%
QF	América	26,031	84%
Total		190,094	

Apertura Copa MX
Rnd	Rival	Attendance	Percentage
1	Juárez	17,272	55.7%
4	Tijuana	7,845	25.3%
Total		25,117	

Torneo Clausura
Rnd	Rival	Attendance	Percentage
2	Puebla	12,242	39.5%
4	UANL	20,412	79.3%
6	Cruz Azul	19,221	74.7%
