= 2019–20 Copa MX =

82nd staging of the Copa MX

Tournament details
- Country: Mexico
- Teams: 27

Final positions
- Champions: Monterrey (3rd title)
- Runners-up: Tijuana

Tournament statistics
- Matches played: 92
- Goals scored: 216 (2.35 per match)
- Attendance: 879,697 (9,562 per match)
- Top goal scorer(s): Kevin Castañeda; Vincent Janssen (7 goals)

The 2019–20 Copa MX was the 82nd staging of the Copa MX, the 54th staging in the professional era and the fifteenth tournament played since the 1996–97 edition. The tournament started on 30 July 2019 and ended on 4 November 2020.

It marked the first year since it was restored in 2012 that only one tournament will be played in the Mexican football year. In previous years, two tournaments (Apertura and Clausura) were played throughout the year.

América were the defending champions after they defeated Juárez 0–1 in the Clausura 2019 final.

The winners would have qualified for the 2020 Leagues Cup. However, the Leagues Cup was canceled due to the COVID-19 pandemic in North America.

This has also been the latest edition of the tournament, as it suspended play due to the COVID-19 pandemic and the Mexican Football Federation giving preference for matches for the Mexico National Football Team towards the 2022 FIFA World Cup.

== Participants ==
This tournament featured the 15 clubs from Liga MX who did not participate in the 2020 CONCACAF Champions League (América, Cruz Azul, León, and UANL).

The tournament also featured the top 12 Ascenso MX teams of the 2018–19 aggregate table not promoted to Liga MX.

Location of the participating teams.
Red: Liga MX clubs; Blue: Ascenso MX clubs

== Draw ==
The draw for the tournament took place on 12 June 2019 in Cancún. 27 teams were drawn into nine groups of three, with each group containing one team from each of the three pots.

Clubs in Pot 1 were drawn to be the seed of each group according to the order of their drawing. That is, the first club that was drawn is seed of Group 1, the second drawn is seed of Group 2 and so on and so on. The Liga MX teams in Pot 1 are the five best teams in the 2018–19 Liga MX aggregate table not participating in the 2020 CONCACAF Champions League. Pot 1 also contains the top four Ascenso MX teams in the 2018–19 Ascenso MX aggregate table.

Pot 2 contains the next five best placed Liga MX clubs in the 2018–19 Liga MX aggregate table and Ascenso MX clubs who ended 7–11 in the 2018–19 Ascenso MX aggregate table. Pot 2 also contains Juárez who replaced Lobos BUAP (ranked 13th in Liga MX aggregate table) in Liga MX.

Pot 3 contains the next five Liga MX clubs in the 2018–19 Liga MX aggregate table and the Ascenso MX clubs who ended 12–14 in the 2018–19 Ascenso MX aggregate table. Pot 3 also contains recently promoted Atlético San Luis.

=== Teams ===
Pot 1
Atlante (AMX)	Monterrey (LMX)	Pachuca (LMX)
Santos Laguna (LMX)	Sinaloa (AMX)	Sonora (AMX)
Toluca (LMX)	UNAM (LMX)	Zacatecas (AMX)
Pot 2
Juárez (LMX)	Necaxa (LMX)	Oaxaca (AMX)
Puebla (LMX)	Tijuana (LMX)	UAEM (AMX)
UAT (AMX)	UdeG (AMX)	Zacatepec (AMX)
Pot 3
Atlas (LMX)	Atlético San Luis (LMX)	Celaya (AMX)
Chiapas (AMX)	Guadalajara (LMX)	Morelia (LMX)
Querétaro (LMX)	Venados (AMX)	Veracruz (LMX)

== Tiebreakers ==
If two or more clubs are equal on points on completion of the group matches, the following criteria are applied to determine the rankings:

1. scores of the group matches played among the clubs in question;
2. superior goal difference;
3. higher number of goals scored;
4. higher number of goals scored away in the group matches played among the clubs in question;
5. fair play ranking;
6. drawing of lots.

== Group stage ==
Every group is composed of three clubs, each group has at least one club from Liga MX and Ascenso MX.

All match times listed are UTC–6, except for matches in Ciudad Juárez, Culiacán (both UTC–7), Hermosillo and Tijuana (both UTC–8).

=== Group 1 ===
Pos	Team	Pld	W	D	L	GF	GA	GD	Pts	Qualification
1	Morelia	4	4	0	0	5	0	+5	12	Advance to knockout stage
2	Puebla	4	0	2	2	1	3	−2	2	
3	Sonora	4	0	2	2	1	4	−3	2	

Source: Copa MX
Rules for classification: Tiebreakers

6 August 2019	Morelia	1–0	Puebla	Morelia, Michoacán
21:00	Mendoza 31'	Final Vuelta		Stadium: Estadio Morelos; Attendance: 10,656; Referee: Jorge Isaac Rojas

13 August 2019	Sonora	0–1	Morelia	Hermosillo, Sonora
19:00		Report	Villafáñez 19'	Stadium: Estadio Héroe de Nacozari; Attendance: 3,285; Referee: Juan Andres Esquivel

3 September 2019	Morelia	2–0	Sonora	Morelia, Michoacán
19:00	Ferreira 11'; Martínez 85'	Report		Stadium: Estadio Morelos; Attendance: 7,614; Referee: Saúl Silva

1 October 2019	Puebla	0–1	Morelia	Puebla, Puebla
21:00		Report	Ferreira 67'	Stadium: Estadio Cuauhtémoc; Attendance: 3,800; Referee: Edgar Ulises Rangel

23 October 2019	Sonora	1–1	Puebla	Hermosillo, Sonora
19:00	López 68'	Report	F. Ramírez 54'	Stadium: Estadio Héroe de Nacozari; Attendance: 2,185; Referee: Áxel Meza

5 November 2019	Puebla	0–0	Sonora	Puebla, Puebla
19:00		Report		Stadium: Estadio Cuauhtémoc; Attendance: 5,964; Referee: Alan Enrique Martínez

=== Group 2 ===
Pos	Team	Pld	W	D	L	GF	GA	GD	Pts	Qualification
1	Monterrey	4	4	0	0	12	3	+9	12	Advance to knockout stage
2	Chiapas	4	2	0	2	3	8	−5	6	Advance to knockout stage
3	UdeG	4	0	0	4	2	6	−4	0	

Source: Copa MX
Rules for classification: Tiebreakers

31 July 2019	Monterrey	2–1	UdeG	Guadalupe, Nuevo León
21:00	Sánchez 61'; Funes Mori 66'	Report	Amador 72'	Stadium: Estadio BBVA; Attendance: 22,546; Referee: Guillermo Pacheco

13 August 2019	UdeG	0–1	Chiapas	Guadalajara, Jalisco
19:00		Report	Arizala 60' (pen.)	Stadium: Estadio Jalisco; Attendance: 2,200; Referee: Jesús Rafael López

3 September 2019	Chiapas	1–0	UdeG	Tuxtla Gutiérrez, Chiapas
21:00	Aguayo 23'	Report		Stadium: Estadio Víctor Manuel Reyna; Attendance: 6,317; Referee: Brian González

11 October 2019 (Note: The Chiapas v Monterrey match was originally played on 6 August 2019 but was suspended at halftime due to torrential rain. The second half of the match was played on 11 October 2019.)	Chiapas	1–2	Monterrey	Tuxtla Gutiérrez, Chiapas
20:00	Vélez 10'	Report	Vangioni 18'; Montes 86'	Stadium: Estadio Víctor Manuel Reyna; Attendance: 5,700; Referee: Adrián Vielmas

23 October 2019	UdeG	1–2	Monterrey	Guadalajara, Jalisco
19:00	Ceballos 80'	Report	Janssen 8', 18'	Stadium: Estadio Jalisco; Attendance: 4,875; Referee: Luis Daniel Chávez

5 November 2019	Monterrey	6–0	Chiapas	Guadalupe, Nuevo León
21:00	Janssen 34' (pen.), 86', 89'; C. Rodríguez 39'; Zaldívar 42', 64'	Report		Stadium: Estadio BBVA; Attendance: 10,158; Referee: Víctor Alfonso Cáceres

=== Group 3 ===
Pos	Team	Pld	W	D	L	GF	GA	GD	Pts	
1	Juárez	4	3	1	0	6	2	+4	10	Advance to knockout stage
2	Venados	4	2	1	1	7	4	+3	7	Advance to knockout stage
3	Atlante	4	0	0	4	1	8	−7	0	

Source: Copa MX
Rules for classification: Tiebreakers

30 July 2019	Venados	4–1	Atlante	Mérida, Yucatán
19:00	Polo 11' (pen.); Torres 35', 71'; Fernández 87'	Report	Vera 82'	Stadium: Estadio Carlos Iturralde; Attendance: 3,272; Referee: Edgar Allan Morales

6 August 2019	Juárez	1–1	Venados	Ciudad Juárez, Chihuahua
20:00	Pérez 31'	Report	Uscanga 47'	Stadium: Estadio Olímpico Benito Juárez; Attendance: 6,612; Referee: Víctor Cáceres

13 August 2019	Atlante	0–2	Juárez	Cancún, Quintana Roo
21:00		Report	Carrijó 40'; López 76'	Stadium: Estadio Andrés Quintana Roo; Attendance: 3,132; Referee: Luis Daniel Chávez

4 September 2019	Venados	1–2	Juárez	Mérida, Yucatán
19:00	Tamay 12'	Report	Hachen 61'; Carrijó 90+4'	Stadium: Estadio Carlos Iturralde; Attendance: 3,336; Referee: Eduardo Alberto Vázquez

2 October 2019	Juárez	1–0	Atlante	Ciudad Juárez, Chihuahua
20:00	Carrijó 88'	Report		Stadium: Estadio Olímpico Benito Juárez; Attendance: 6,860; Referee: Aldo Cano Martínez

5 November 2019	Atlante	0–1	Venados	Cancún, Quintana Roo
21:00		Report	Camargo 81'	Stadium: Estadio Andrés Quintana Roo; Attendance: 1,343; Referee: Luis Daniel Chávez

=== Group 4 ===
Pos	Team	Pld	W	D	L	GF	GA	GD	Pts	Qualification
1	Toluca	4	4	0	0	8	1	+7	12	Advance to knockout stage
2	Veracruz	4	1	1	2	2	4	−2	4	
3	Oaxaca	4	0	1	3	2	7	−5	1	

Source: Copa MX
Rules for classification: Tiebreakers

31 July 2019	Toluca	1–0	Oaxaca	Toluca, Estado de México
19:00	Aguayo 9' (o.g.)	Report		Stadium: Estadio Nemesio Diez; Attendance: 15,200; Referee: Víctor Cáceres

7 September 2019	Oaxaca	1–4	Toluca	Oaxaca, Oaxaca
19:00	Marín 43'	Report	Gigliotti 25'; Chalá 45'; Castañeda 62'; Millán 88'	Stadium: Estadio Tecnológico de Oaxaca; Attendance: 13,009; Referee: Luis Daniel Chávez

2 October 2019	Toluca	2–0	Veracruz	Toluca, Estado de México
18:10	Castañeda 55'; Canelo 90+4'	Report		Stadium: Estadio Nemesio Diez; Attendance: 15,611; Referee: Oscar Macías Romo

12 October 2019	Veracruz	0–1	Toluca	Boca del Río, Veracruz
21:00		Report	William 70'	Stadium: Estadio Luis "Pirata" Fuente; Attendance: 3,229; Referee: Edgar Ulises Rangel

22 October 2019	Veracruz	1–0	Oaxaca	Boca del Río, Veracruz
19:00	Henestrosa 33'			Stadium: Estadio Luis "Pirata" Fuente; Attendance: 320; Referee: Alan Enrique Martínez

5 November 2019	Oaxaca	1–1	Veracruz	Oaxaca, Oaxaca
19:00	Martín 60' (pen.)	Report	Chávez 44'	Stadium: Estadio Tecnológico de Oaxaca; Attendance: 6,125; Referee: Brian Omar González

=== Group 5 ===
Pos	Team	Pld	W	D	L	GF	GA	GD	Pts	
1	Tijuana	4	3	0	1	9	5	+4	9	Advance to knockout stage
2	Querétaro	4	2	0	2	5	7	−2	6	Advance to knockout stage
3	Zacatecas	4	1	0	3	5	7	−2	3	

Source: Copa MX
Rules for classification: Tiebreakers

30 July 2019	Tijuana	2–0	Querétaro	Tijuana, Baja California
19:00	Bolaños 82'; Camilo 87'	Report		Stadium: Estadio Caliente; Attendance: 24,333; Referee: Mario Humberto Vargas

6 August 2019	Zacatecas	2–0	Querétaro	Zacatecas, Zacatecas
21:00	Pérez 24'; Reyes 67'	Report		Stadium: Estadio Carlos Vega Villalba; Attendance: 2,497; Referee: Aldo Cano

13 August 2019	Querétaro	3–2	Tijuana	Querétaro, Querétaro
19:00	Cortizo 23'; Corral 53'; Vázquez 62'	Report	Miranda 32' (pen.); Camilo 70'	Stadium: Estadio Corregidora; Attendance: 11,432; Referee: Alejandro Funk

4 September 2019	Zacatecas	2–3	Tijuana	Zacatecas, Zacatecas
19:00	Nurse 6'; Monreal 10'	Report	Silva 24'; Nahuelpán 60'; E. Torres 90+1'	Stadium: Estadio Carlos Vega Villalba; Attendance: 3,532; Referee: Guillermo Pacheco Larios

2 October 2019	Querétaro	2–1	Zacatecas	Querétaro, Querétaro
21:00	Triverio 16'; Sierra 29'	Report	Cisneros 14'	Stadium: Estadio Corregidora; Attendance: 6,180; Referee: Alan Martínez Vega

22 October 2019	Tijuana	2–0	Zacatecas	Tijuana, Baja California
19:00	Camilo 41', 61'	Report		Stadium: Estadio Caliente; Attendance: 17,333; Referee: Saul Alfredo Silva

=== Group 6 ===
Pos	Team	Pld	W	D	L	GF	GA	GD	Pts	Qualification
1	Sinaloa	4	3	1	0	8	5	+3	10	Advance to knockout stage
2	Celaya	4	1	1	2	3	4	−1	4	Advance to knockout stage
3	Necaxa	4	0	2	2	3	5	−2	2	

Source: Copa MX
Rules for classification: Tiebreakers

7 August 2019	Sinaloa	2–1	Celaya	Culiacán, Sinaloa
20:00	Á. López 33' (pen.); Escoto 85'	Report	Benítez 15'	Stadium: Estadio Banorte; Attendance: 3,943; Referee: Guillermo Pacheco Larios

13 August 2019	Necaxa	2–2	Sinaloa	Aguascalientes, Aguascalientes
21:00	López 54'; Herrera 78'	Report	D. González 65'; Ortiz 90+2'	Stadium: Estadio Victoria; Attendance: 6,328; Referee: Aldo Cano Martínez

4 September 2019	Necaxa	0–0	Celaya	Aguascalientes, Aguascalientes
19:00		Report		Stadium: Estadio Victoria; Attendance: 10,061; Referee: Alan Martínez

1 October 2019	Celaya	1–2	Sinaloa	Celaya, Guanajuato
19:00	Camacho 49'	Report	Nava 27'; Rubin 89'	Stadium: Estadio Miguel Alemán Valdés; Attendance: 1,225; Referee: Louis Adrian Vielmas

22 October 2019	Sinaloa	2–1	Necaxa	Culiacán, Sinaloa
20:00	Escoto 34'; Monges 54'	Report	Herrera 11'	Stadium: Estadio Banorte; Attendance: 5,093; Referee: Víctor Alfonso Cáceres

6 November 2019	Celaya	1–0	Necaxa	Celaya, Guanajuato
19:00	Benítez 56'	Report		Stadium: Estadio Miguel Alemán Valdés; Attendance: 2,616; Referee: Edgar Allan Morales

=== Group 7 ===
Pos	Team	Pld	W	D	L	GF	GA	GD	Pts	Qualification
1	Santos Laguna	4	2	1	1	8	3	+5	7	Advance to knockout stage
2	Guadalajara	4	2	0	2	4	4	0	6	Advance to knockout stage
3	UAT	4	1	1	2	2	7	−5	4	

Source: Copa MX
Rules for classification: Tiebreakers

30 July 2019	Santos Laguna	1–1	UAT	Torreón, Coahuila
19:00	Valdés 56'	Report	López 42'	Stadium: Estadio Corona; Attendance: 11,752; Referee: Juan Andrés Esquivel

7 August 2019	Guadalajara	2–1	Santos Laguna	Zapopan, Jalisco
19:00	Vega 82', 85'	Report	Dória 49'	Stadium: Estadio Akron; Attendance: 18,931; Referee: Mario Humberto Vargas

4 September 2019	Guadalajara	0–1	UAT	Zapopan, Jalisco
21:00		Report	Vilchis 86'	Stadium: Estadio Akron; Attendance: 10,210; Referee: Juan Esquivel

1 October 2019	UAT	0–2	Guadalajara	Ciudad Victoria, Tamaulipas
21:00		Report	Peralta 56'; Mayorga 63'	Stadium: Estadio Marte R. Gómez; Attendance: 10,118; Referee: Guillermo Pacheco Larios

22 October 2019	UAT	0–4	Santos Laguna	Ciudad Victoria, Tamaulipas
21:00		Report	Rivero 14', 34'; Aguirre 37'; Lozano 45'	Stadium: Estadio Marte R. Gómez; Attendance: 3,208; Referee: Juan Andrés Esquivel

6 November 2019	Santos Laguna	2–0	Guadalajara	Torreón, Coahuila
21:00	A. Lozano 75' (pen.); Rivero 90+7'	Report		Stadium: Estadio Corona; Attendance: 14,406; Referee: Edgar Ulises Rangel

=== Group 8 ===
Pos	Team	Pld	W	D	L	GF	GA	GD	Pts	Qualification
1	UNAM	4	2	2	0	6	1	+5	8	Advance to knockout stage
2	Atlético de San Luis	4	2	1	1	6	6	0	7	Advance to knockout stage
3	UAEM	4	0	1	3	1	6	−5	1	

Source: Copa MX
Rules for classification: Tiebreakers

31 July 2019	UNAM	1–1	Atlético San Luis	Mexico City
21:00	A. García 79'	Report	Centurión 21'	Stadium: Estadio Olímpico Universitario; Attendance: 7,216; Referee: Alejandro Funk

7 August 2019	Atlético San Luis	3–1	UAEM	San Luis Potosí, San Luis Potosí
21:00	Valdez 38', 56', 81'	Report	Esquivel 60'	Stadium: Estadio Alfonso Lastras; Attendance: 7,347; Referee: Brian Omar González

13 August 2019	UNAM	1–0	UAEM	Mexico City
21:00	Mendoza 48'	Report		Stadium: Estadio Olímpico Universitario; Attendance: 5,932; Referee: Édgar Espadas

3 September 2019	UAEM	0–2	Atlético San Luis	Toluca, Estado de México
21:00		Report	Pineda 15', 33' (pen.)	Stadium: Estadio Alberto "Chivo" Córdoba; Attendance: 3,195; Referee: Jesús Ruiz

2 October 2019	Atlético San Luis	0–4	UNAM	San Luis Potosí, San Luis Potosí
21:00		Report	Escamilla 13'; Mora 20', 24'; Freire 53'	Stadium: Estadio Alfonso Lastras; Attendance: 12,590; Referee: Erick Yair Miranda

13 October 2019	UAEM	0–0	UNAM	Toluca, Estado de México
12:00		Report		Stadium: Estadio Alberto "Chivo" Córdoba; Attendance: 12,411; Referee: Ricardo Ulises Norman

=== Group 9 ===
Pos	Team	Pld	W	D	L	GF	GA	GD	Pts	Qualification
1	Pachuca	4	2	2	0	8	3	+5	8	Advance to knockout stage
2	Atlas	4	1	2	1	6	5	+1	5	Advance to knockout stage
3	Zacatepec	4	1	0	3	4	10	−6	3	

Source: Copa MX
Rules for classification: Tiebreakers

30 July 2019	Atlas	1–1	Pachuca	Guadalajara, Jalisco
21:00	Álvarez 30'	Report	Copete 83'	Stadium: Estadio Jalisco; Attendance: 18,890; Referee: Luis Enrique Santander

6 August 2019	Zacatepec	3–2	Atlas	Zacatepec, Morelos
19:00	Basulto 46'; Ramírez 57', 61'	Report	Zaldívar 13'; Correa 77'	Stadium: Estadio Agustín "Coruco" Díaz; Attendance: 5,907; Referee: Ricardo Norman

13 August 2019	Pachuca	3–1	Zacatepec	Pachuca, Hidalgo
21:00	Ulloa 25' (pen.); De la Rosa 35'; Dávila 39'	Report	Prieto 57'	Stadium: Estadio Hidalgo; Attendance: 10,314; Referee: Edgar Allan Morales

1 October 2019	Atlas	2–0	Zacatepec	Guadalajara, Jalisco
19:00	Trejo 29'; Álvarez 50'	Report		Stadium: Estadio Jalisco; Attendance: 13,203; Referee: Victor Alfonso Caceres

23 October 2019	Zacatepec	0–3	Pachuca	Zacatepec, Morelos
21:00		Report	Ibarra 63'; Cardona 81', 87'	Stadium: Estadio Agustín "Coruco" Díaz; Attendance: 5,876; Referee: Edgar Allan Morales

6 November 2019	Pachuca	1–1	Atlas	Pachuca, Hidalgo
19:00	Cabral 74'	Report	Martínez 9'	Stadium: Estadio Hidalgo; Attendance: 8,371; Referee: Erick Yair Miranda

=== Ranking of second-placed teams ===
Pos	Grp	Team	Pld	W	D	L	GF	GA	GD	Pts	Qualification
1	3	Venados	4	2	1	1	7	4	+3	7	Advance to knockout stage
2	8	Atlético San Luis	4	2	1	1	7	7	0	7	Advance to knockout stage
3	7	Guadalajara	4	2	0	2	4	3	+1	6	Advance to knockout stage
4	5	Querétaro	4	2	0	2	5	7	−2	6	Advance to knockout stage
5	2	Chiapas	4	2	0	2	3	8	−5	6	Advance to knockout stage
6	9	Atlas	4	1	2	1	6	5	+1	5	Advance to knockout stage
7	6	Celaya	4	1	1	2	3	4	−1	4	Advance to knockout stage
8	4	Veracruz	4	1	1	2	2	4	−2	4	
9	1	Puebla	4	0	2	2	1	3	−2	2	

Source: Copa MX
Rules for classification: Tiebreakers

== Knockout stage ==
- The clubs that advance to this stage will be ranked and seeded 1 to 16 based on performance in the group stage. In case of ties, the same tiebreakers used to rank the runners-up will be used.
- The winners of the groups and the seven best second place teams of each group will advance to the Knockout stage.
- Unlike previous editions, the 16 qualified teams will play a single-elimination tournament. Each tie will be played on a home-and-away two-legged basis. There is no away goals rule. If the aggregate score is tied after the second leg, it will proceed directly to a penalty shoot-out. The highest seeded club will host each match, regardless of which division each club belongs.

=== Qualified teams ===
The nine group winners and the seven best runners-up from the group stage qualify for the final stage.

Group	Winners	Runners-up
1	Morelia	—
2	Monterrey	Chiapas
3	Juárez	Venados
4	Toluca	—
5	Tijuana	Querétaro
6	Sinaloa	Celaya
7	Santos Laguna	Guadalajara
8	UNAM	Atlético San Luis
9	Pachuca	Atlas

=== Seeding ===
Seed	Grp	Team	Pld	W	D	L	GF	GA	GD	Pts
1	2	Monterrey	4	4	0	0	12	3	+9	12
2	4	Toluca	4	4	0	0	8	1	+7	12
3	1	Morelia	4	4	0	0	5	0	+5	12
4	3	Juárez	4	3	1	0	6	2	+4	10
5	6	Sinaloa	4	3	1	0	8	5	+3	10
6	5	Tijuana	4	3	0	1	9	5	+4	9
7	9	Pachuca	4	2	2	0	8	3	+5	8
8	8	UNAM	4	2	2	0	6	1	+5	8
9	7	Santos Laguna	4	2	1	1	8	3	+5	7
10	3	Venados	4	2	1	1	7	4	+3	7
11	8	Atlético San Luis	4	2	1	1	6	6	0	7
12	7	Guadalajara	4	2	0	2	4	4	0	6
13	5	Querétaro	4	2	0	2	5	7	−2	6
14	2	Chiapas	4	2	0	2	3	8	−5	6
15	9	Atlas	4	1	2	1	6	5	+1	5
16	6	Celaya	4	1	1	2	3	4	−1	4

Source: Copa MX
Rules for classification: 1) Points; 2) Goal difference; 3) Goals scored; 4) Away goals scored; 5) Drawing of lots.

=== Bracket ===
Round of 16
1	Monterrey	4	3	7
16	Celaya	3	0	3
8	UNAM	2	2	4
9	Santos Laguna	4	1	5
4	Juárez	2	3	5
13	Querétaro	3	1	4
5	Sinaloa (p)	2	0	2 (6)
12	Guadalajara	1	1	2 (5)
2	Toluca (p)	1	3	4 (5)
15	Atlas	2	2	4 (3)
7	Pachuca	1	3	4
10	Venados	1	1	2
3	Morelia (p)	1	3	4 (3)
14	Chiapas	4	0	4 (2)
6	Tijuana	1	1	2
11	Atlético San Luis	0	0	0

Quarterfinals
1	Monterrey	0	1	1
9	Santos Laguna	0	0	0
4	Juárez	0	3	3
5	Sinaloa	0	0	0
2	Toluca	2	5	7
7	Pachuca	2	1	3
3	Morelia	1	0	1
6	Tijuana	3	0	3

Semifinals
1	Monterrey (p)	0	2	2 (6)
4	Juárez	2	0	2 (5)
2	Toluca	0	3	3
6	Tijuana	3	4	7

Finals
1	Monterrey	1	1	2
6	Tijuana	0	1	1

=== Round of 16 ===
==== Summary ====
The first legs were played on 21–22 January, and the second legs were played on 28–29 January.

Team 1	Agg.	Team 2	1st leg	2nd leg
Celaya	3–7	Monterrey	3–4	0–3
Atlas	4–4 (3–5 p)	Toluca	2–1	2–3
Chiapas	4–4 (2–3 p)	Morelia	4–1	0–3
Querétaro	4–5	Juárez	3–2	1–3
Guadalajara	2–2 (5–6 p)	Sinaloa	1–2	1–0
Atlético San Luis	0–2	Tijuana	0–1	0–1
Venados	2–4	Pachuca	1–1	1–3
Santos Laguna	5–4	UNAM	4–2	1–2

==== Matches ====
22 January 2020
19:00 CST (UTC−6)

Celaya	3–4	Monterrey
Camacho 19'; Reyes 51'; López 90+3'	Report	Layún 29'; Funes Mori 56' (pen.); Meza 72', 80'

Estadio Miguel Alemán Valdés, Celaya
Attendance: 10,301
Referee: Edgar Allan Morales
29 January 2020
21:10 CST (UTC−6)

Monterrey	3–0	Celaya
Gallardo 8'; Janssen 65'; Layún 73'	Report

Estadio BBVA, Guadalupe
Attendance: 24,644
Referee: Víctor Cáceres Hernández

Monterrey won 7–3 on aggregate

22 January 2020
21:00 CST (UTC−6)

Atlas	2–1	Toluca
Jeraldino 57'; Zaldívar 22'	Report	Castañeda 42'

Estadio Jalisco, Guadalajara
Attendance: 14,958
Referee: Juan Andrés Esquivel
28 January 2020
19:00 CST (UTC−6)

Toluca	3–2	Atlas
Estrada 17'; Diego 77'; Güémez 87'	Report	Correa 28'; Conti 49'
Penalties
Fernández (penalty scored); Canelo (penalty scored); Diego (penalty scored); Ruiz (penalty scored); Güémez (penalty scored)	5−3	(penalty scored) Isijara; (penalty scored) Abella; (penalty missed) Reyes; (penalty scored) Zaldívar

Estadio Nemesio Díez, Toluca
Attendance: 24,446
Referee: Luis Enrique Santander

4–4 on aggregate. Toluca won 5–3 on penalty kicks.

22 January 2020
19:00 CST (UTC−6)

Chiapas	4–1	Morelia
Jaques 19'; Díaz 39' (pen.), 75' (pen.); Imperiale 90+2'	Report	Aristeguieta 29'

Estadio Víctor Manuel Reyna, Tuxtla Gutiérrez
Attendance: 8,214
Referee: Alan Enrique Martínez
29 January 2020
19:00 CST (UTC−6)

Morelia	3–0	Chiapas
Rocha 15' (pen.), 45'; Aristeguieta 58'	Report
Penalties
Rocha (penalty scored); Aristeguieta (penalty scored); Achilier (penalty missed); Mendoza (penalty scored)	3−2	(penalty missed) Díaz; (penalty scored) Monge; (penalty scored) Venegas; (penalty missed) Martínez; (penalty missed) Illanes

Estadio Morelos, Morelia
Attendance: 10,522
Referee: Jorge Antonio Pérez

4–4 on aggregate. Morelia won 3–2 on penalty kicks.

21 January 2020
19:00 CST (UTC−6)

Querétaro	3–2	Juárez
Triverio 3'; Viniegra 47' (o.g.); Cortizo 52'	Report	Cadete 39' (o.g.); Rubio 87'

Estadio Corregidora, Querétaro
Attendance: 9,511
Referee: Alejandro Funk Villafañe
29 January 2020
20:10 MST (UTC−7)

Juárez	3–1	Querétaro
Sagal 45'; Rabuñal 53'; Lezcano 84' (pen.)	Report	Castillo 68'

Estadio Olímpico Benito Juárez, Ciudad Juárez
Attendance: 9,147
Referee: César Arturo Ramos

Juárez won 5–4 on aggregate

21 January 2020
21:00 CST (UTC−6)

Guadalajara	1–2	Sinaloa
Calderón 90+3'	Report	Escoto 39' (pen.); Monges 59'

Estadio Akron, Zapopan
Attendance: 21,853
Referee: Víctor Alfonso Cáceres
28 January 2020
20:10 MST (UTC−7)

Sinaloa	0–1	Guadalajara
	Report	Calderón 24'
Penalties
Escoto (penalty scored); Contreras (penalty scored); Domínguez (penalty scored); Muñoz (penalty scored); Monges (penalty scored); Zúñiga (penalty scored)	6−5	(penalty scored) Briseño; (penalty scored) Antuna; (penalty scored) Sepúlveda; (penalty scored) Calderón; (penalty scored) López; (penalty missed) Ponce

Estadio Banorte, Culiacán
Attendance: 19,333
Referee: Alan Enrique Martínez

2–2 on aggregate. Sinaloa won 6–5 on penalty kicks.

21 January 2020
21:00 CST (UTC−6)

Atlético San Luis	0–1	Tijuana
	Report	Sánchez 83'

Estadio Alfonso Lastras, San Luis Potosí
Attendance: 8,742
Referee: Mario Humberto Vargas
28 January 2020
19:10 PST (UTC−8)

Tijuana	1–0	Atlético San Luis
López 67'	Report

Estadio Caliente, Tijuana
Attendance: 17,333
Referee: Óscar Macías

Tijuana won 2–0 on aggregate

21 January 2020
19:00 CST (UTC−6)

Venados	1–1	Pachuca
Acosta 8'	Report	Copete 90+5'

Estadio Carlos Iturralde, Mérida
Attendance: 6,588
Referee: Saúl Alfredo Silva
28 January 2020
19:00 CST (UTC−6)

Pachuca	3–1	Venados
Kazim-Richards 11', 67', 86'	Report	Acosta 68'

Estadio Hidalgo, Pachuca
Attendance: 7,545
Referee: Eduardo Galván

Pachuca won 4–2 on aggregate

22 January 2020
21:00 CST (UTC−6)

Santos Laguna	4–2	UNAM
Aguirre 30', 66'; Rivero 49', 59'	Report	M. García 70' (pen.); Malcorra 90+1' (pen.)

Estadio Corona, Torreón
Attendance: 9,042
Referee: Brian Gonzalez Veles
29 January 2020
19:00 CST (UTC−6)

UNAM	2–1	Santos Laguna
Mayorga 6'; Dinenno 88'	Report	Aguirre 24'

Estadio Olímpico Universitario, Mexico City
Attendance: 9,405
Referee: Marco Antonio Ortiz

Santos Laguna won 5–4 on aggregate

=== Quarterfinals ===
==== Summary ====
The first legs were played on 11–12 February 2020, and the second legs were played on 18–19 February 2020.

Team 1	Agg.	Team 2	1st leg	2nd leg
Santos Laguna	0–1	Monterrey	0–0	0–1
Pachuca	3–7	Toluca	2–2	1–5
Tijuana	3–1	Morelia	3–1	0–0
Sinaloa	0–3	Juárez	0–0	0–3

==== Matches ====
11 February 2020
19:00 CST (UTC−6)

Santos Laguna	0–0	Monterrey
	Report

Estadio Corona, Torreón
Attendance: 9,931
Referee: Eduardo Galván Basulto
19 February 2020
19:00 CST (UTC−6)

Monterrey	1–0	Santos Laguna
Alvarado 3'	Report

Estadio BBVA, Guadalupe
Attendance: 27,100
Referee: Diego Montaño Robles

Monterrey won 1–0 on aggregate

12 February 2020
19:00 CST (UTC−6)

Pachuca	2–2	Toluca
Jara 39'; Orona 90+4'	Report	Estrada 19'; Pardo 75'

Estadio Hidalgo, Pachuca
Attendance: 12,869
Referee: Jorge Isaac Rojas
18 February 2020
21:00 CST (UTC−6)

Toluca	5–1	Pachuca
Castañeda 47', 85'; Estrada 57', 71'; Canelo 71'	Report	Dávila 29'

Estadio Nemesio Díez, Toluca
Attendance: 25,744
Referee: Marco Antonio Ortiz

Toluca won 7–3 on aggregate

11 February 2020
19:00 PST (UTC−8)

Tijuana	3–1	Morelia
González Pírez 19'; Colula 79'; Torres 83' (pen.)	Report	Rodríguez 62'

Estadio Caliente, Tijuana
Attendance: 24,333
Referee: Oscar Mejia García
18 February 2020
19:00 CST (UTC−6)

Morelia	0–0	Tijuana
	Report

Estadio Morelos, Morelia
Attendance: 20,824
Referee: Jorge Isaac Rojas

Tijuana won 3–1 on aggregate

12 February 2020
20:00 MST (UTC−7)

Sinaloa	0–0	Juárez
	Report

Estadio Banorte, Culiacán
Attendance: 5,623
Referee: Juan Andres Esquivel
19 February 2020
20:00 MST (UTC−7)

Juárez	3–0	Sinaloa
Santos 11', 42'; Rubio 18'	Report

Estadio Olímpico Benito Juárez, Ciudad Juárez
Attendance: 11,356
Referee: Fernando Guerrero

Juárez won 3–0 on aggregate

=== Semifinals ===
==== Summary ====
The first legs were played on 3–4 March 2020, and the second legs were played on 10–11 March 2020.

Team 1	Agg.	Team 2	1st leg	2nd leg
Juárez	2–2 (5–6 p)	Monterrey	2–0	0–2
Tijuana	7–3	Toluca	3–0	4–3

==== Matches ====
4 March 2020
20:00 MST (UTC−7)

Juárez	2–0	Monterrey
Lezcano 87'; Rolán 90+3'	Report

Estadio Olímpico Benito Juárez, Ciudad Juárez
Attendance: 13,963
Referee: Marco Antonio Ortiz
11 March 2020
21:00 CST (UTC−6)

Monterrey	2–0	Juárez
Funes Mori 6'; Sánchez 67'	Report
Penalties
J. González (penalty missed); Sánchez (penalty scored); Funes Mori (penalty scored); Pabón (penalty scored); Meza (penalty scored); Cárdenas (penalty scored); Rodríguez (penalty scored)	6−5	(penalty scored) Olivera; (penalty scored) Lezcano; (penalty scored) Romo; (penalty scored) Intriago; (penalty missed) Rolán; (penalty scored) Nevarez; (penalty missed) Viniegra

Estadio BBVA, Guadalupe
Attendance: 28,404
Referee: Eduardo Galván Basulto

2–2 on aggregate. Monterrey won 6–5 on penalty kicks.

3 March 2020
19:00 PST (UTC−8)

Tijuana	3–0	Toluca
Angulo 18', 36', 55'	Report

Estadio Caliente, Tijuana
Attendance: 24,333
Referee: Diego Montaño Robles
10 March 2020
21:00 CST (UTC−6)

Toluca	3–4	Tijuana
Güémez 6'; Castañeda 35', 52'	Report	González Pírez 29'; Rivera 63'; Silva 65'; Barbieri 71'

Estadio Nemesio Diez, Toluca
Attendance: 25,744
Referee: Fernando Guerrero

Tijuana won 7–3 on aggregate

=== Finals ===
==== Summary ====
The first and second legs were scheduled to be played on 8 April 2020 and 22 April 2020 but were postponed due to the COVID-19 pandemic in Mexico to 21 October and 4 November 2020.

Team 1	Agg.	Team 2	1st leg	2nd leg
Tijuana	1–2	Monterrey	0–1	1–1

==== Matches ====
21 October 2020
19:06 PDT (UTC−8)

Tijuana	0–1	Monterrey
	Report	Sánchez 18' (pen.)

Estadio Caliente, Tijuana
Referee: Eduardo Galvan Basulto
4 November 2020
20:36 CST (UTC−6)

Monterrey	1–1	Tijuana
Janssen 87' (pen.)	Report	Barbona 88'

Estadio BBVA, Guadalupe
Referee: Jorge Antonio Pérez

Monterrey won 2–1 on aggregate

== Top goalscorers ==
Players sorted first by goals scored, then by last name.

Players and teams in bold are still active in the competition.

Rank	Player	Club	Goals
1	(Mexico) Kevin Castañeda	Toluca	7
1	(Netherlands) Vincent Janssen	Monterrey	7
3	(Uruguay) Octavio Rivero	Santos Laguna	5
4	(Mexico) Eduardo Aguirre	Santos Laguna	4
4	(Brazil) Camilo Sanvezzo	Tijuana	4
6	(Ecuador) Brayan Angulo	Tijuana	3
6	(Brazil) Leandro Carrijó	Juárez	3
6	(Mexico) Amaury Escoto	Sinaloa	3
6	(Ecuador) Michael Estrada	Toluca	3
6	(Argentina) Rogelio Funes Mori	Monterrey	3
6	(Turkey) Colin Kazim-Richards	Pachuca	3
6	(Argentina) Nicolás Sánchez	Monterrey	3
6	(Paraguay) Diego Valdez	Atlético San Luis	3

Source: Liga MX
