= Kevin Castañeda =

Mexican footballer (born 1999)

Personal information
- Full name: Kevin Castañeda
- Date of birth: 28 October 1999 (age 27)
- Place of birth: Guadalajara, Jalisco, Mexico
- Height: 1.71 m (5 ft 7 in)
- Position: Attacking midfielder

Team information
- Current team: Guadalajara
- Number: 19

Senior career*
Years	Team	Apps	(Gls)
2018–2022	Toluca	71	(5)
2022–2026	Tijuana	112	(24)
2026–	Guadalajara	11	(0)

International career^{‡}
2026–	Mexico	3	(0)
- * Club domestic league appearances and goals as of 31 October 2026 ‡ National team caps and goals as of 22 May 2026

Kevin Castañeda Vargas (born 28 October 1999) is a Mexican professional footballer who plays as an attacking midfielder for Liga MX club Guadalajara and the Mexico national team.

== Club career ==
=== Toluca ===
Castañeda joined Toluca for the Apertura 2018 tournament from the team's Youth System. On 22 July 2018, he made his league debut for Toluca against Monarcas Morelia. Castañeda scored his career's first goal at a Copa MX match against Juárez on 1 August 2018.

Castañeda finished as top scorer of the 2019–20 Copa MX.

=== Tijuana ===
On 22 June 2022, Castañeda signed with Tijuana.

=== Guadalajara ===
On 17 June 2026, Castañeda joined Guadalajara following an exchange agreement that involved Yael Padilla joining Tijuana.

== Career statistics ==
=== Club ===
As of match played on 31 October 2026

Club	Season	League			National Cup		Continental		Other		Total	
Club	Season	Division	Apps	Goals	Apps	Goals	Apps	Goals	Apps	Goals	Apps	Goals
Toluca	2018–19	Liga MX	3	0	2	1	—		—		5	1
Toluca	2019–20	Liga MX	9	1	9	7	—		—		18	8
Toluca	2020–21	Liga MX	30	3	—		—		—		30	3
Toluca	2021–22	Liga MX	29	1	—		—		—		29	1
Toluca	Total		71	5	11	8	—		—		82	13
Tijuana	2022–23	Liga MX	11	0	—		—		—		11	0
Tijuana	2023–24	Liga MX	30	3	—		—		2 (Note: Appearances in Leagues Cup)	0	32	3
Tijuana	2024–25	Liga MX	34	8	—		—		2	1	36	9
Tijuana	2025–26	Liga MX	37	13	—		—		3	1	40	14
Tijuana	Total		112	24	—		—		7	2	119	26
Guadalajara	2026–27	Liga MX	11	0	—		—		3	0	14	0
Career total			194	29	11	8	0	0	10	2	215	39

=== International ===
As of match played on 22 May 2026

Appearances and goals by national team and year
National team	Year	Apps	Goals
Mexico	2026	3	0
Total		3	0

== Honours ==
Individual

- Copa MX Top Scorer: 2019–20
- Liga MX All-Star: 2025, 2026
