= Iván Zamora =

Mexican footballer (born 1996)

Personal information
- Full name: Iván Zamora Esquivel
- Date of birth: 11 January 1996 (age 30)
- Place of birth: Toluca, México
- Height: 1.68 m (5 ft 6 in)
- Position: Midfielder

Team information
- Current team: Escorpiones
- Number: 10

Youth career
- 2011–2017: Toluca

Senior career*
Years	Team	Apps	(Gls)
2017–2018	Toluca	3	(0)
2018–2019	→ Atlante (loan)	9	(0)
2019	→ Potros UAEM (loan)	7	(0)
2020	→ Tlaxcala (loan)	7	(0)
2020	Toros Neza	0	(0)
2021	Zitácuaro	12	(1)
2021–	Escorpiones	12	(1)
- * Club domestic league appearances and goals as of 23:40, 15 September 2021 (UTC)

Iván Zamora Esquivel (born 11 January 1996) is a Mexican footballer who plays as a midfielder for Escorpiones.
