= Ricardo Cruz (Mexican footballer) =

Mexican footballer (born 1997)

Ricardo Javier Cruz
Personal information
- Full name: Ricardo Javier Cruz González
- Date of birth: 30 August 1997 (age 29)
- Place of birth: Manzanillo, Colima, Mexico
- Height: 1.73 m (5 ft 8 in)
- Position: Midfielder

Team information
- Current team: Jaguares
- Number: 22

Youth career
- Chiapas F.C.

Senior career*
Years	Team	Apps	(Gls)
2015–2016	Chiapas F.C.	5	(0)
2016–2017	→ America (loan)	0	(0)
2017–2019	Toluca	4	(0)
2020	Zitácuaro	6	(0)
2020–2022	Cancún	46	(0)
2022–2023	Tritones Vallarta	17	(2)
2023–2024	Cafetaleros de Chiapas	27	(0)
2024–	Jaguares	1	(0)
- * Club domestic league appearances and goals as of 9 September 2024

Ricardo Javier Cruz González (born 30 August 1997) is a Mexican professional footballer who plays as a midfielder for Jaguares.

== Club career ==
=== Chiapas ===
Cruz debuted on 12 March 2014 in the Copa MX against Veracruz. His debut in Liga MX was on 25 October 2015 against U. de G.

=== América ===
On 9 June 2016, Cruz was loaned to league giants América.
