= Luis Donaldo Hernández =

Mexican footballer (born 1998)

Personal information
- Full name: Luis Donaldo Hernández González
- Date of birth: 2 February 1998 (age 28)
- Place of birth: Tepatitlán, Jalisco, Mexico
- Height: 1.82 m (6 ft 0 in)
- Position: Defender

Team information
- Current team: Zacatecas
- Number: 12

Youth career
- 2014–2016: Chiapas

Senior career*
Years	Team	Apps	(Gls)
2014–2018	Chiapas	3	(0)
2017–2018	→ Tapachula (loan)	28	(2)
2018–2021	Necaxa	8	(0)
2019–2020	→ Toluca (loan)	24	(2)
2020–2021	→ Juárez (loan)	6	(0)
2021–2023	Sinaloa	61	(5)
2023–2025	Sporting	54	(1)
2026–	Zacatecas	0	(0)
- * Club domestic league appearances and goals as of 30 March 2025

Luis Donaldo Hernández González (Note: In this Spanish name, the first or paternal surname is Hernández and the second or maternal family name is González.) (born 2 February 1998) is a Mexican professional footballer who plays as a defender for Liga de Expansión MX club Zacatecas.

== Honours ==
Tapachula

- Ascenso MX: Clausura 2018
