= Osvaldo González =

Chilean footballer (born 1984)

Personal information
- Full name: Osvaldo Alexis González Sepúlveda
- Date of birth: 10 August 1984 (age 42)
- Place of birth: Concepción, Chile
- Height: 1.82 m (6 ft 0 in)
- Position: Defender

Team information
- Current team: Universidad de Concepción
- Number: 4

Youth career
- Luis Acevedo
- Universidad de Concepción

Senior career*
Years	Team	Apps	(Gls)
2005–2008	Universidad de Concepción	84	(1)
2008–2009	Universidad de Chile	68	(3)
2010–2011	Toluca	74	(5)
2011–2016	Universidad de Chile	128	(1)
2016–2019	Toluca	99	(4)
2019–2021	Universidad de Chile	49	(1)
2022	Huachipato	25	(0)
2023–	Universidad de Concepción	18	(1)

International career^{‡}
2008	Chile U23	4	(0)
2008–2015	Chile	14	(0)
- * Club domestic league appearances and goals as of 21:29, 17 December 2020 (UTC). ‡ National team caps and goals as of 20 June 2023

Osvaldo Alexis González Sepúlveda (born 10 August 1984) is a Chilean footballer. He currently plays for Chilean club Universidad de Concepción.

== Club career ==
A product of the Universidad de Concepción youth system, González began playing in the club's under-16 squad coached by Eduardo de la Barra, coming from Club Deportivo Luis Acevedo from San Pedro de la Paz. He later debuted for the senior squad in 2005, and soon after became a regular starter. He then signed with Universidad de Chile. On 9 January he was transferred to Deportivo Toluca of Mexico. On 15 May 2010 he received two yellow cards in the semifinal of the second leg of El Bicentenario 2010. Due to his red card he missed the first leg of the final which Toluca eventually won. After a year and a half in Mexico, Osvaldo finally returned to Universidad de Chile in July 2011. He scored the equalizer goal of the game against Vasco da Gama in the semifinals of the 2011 Copa Sudamericana, which Universidad de Chile finished as champion.

Back to Universidad de Concepción in 2023, they won the 2025 Primera B de Chile.

== International career ==
He has been capped for the Chile senior team fourteen times. In addition, he represented Chile U23 at the 2008 Inter Continental Cup in Malaysia.

== Personal life ==
In 2026, González started a real estate business.

== Career statistics ==
As of match played on 12 April 2018

Appearances and goals by club, season and competition
Club	Season	League			Cup		League Cup		Other		Total	
Club	Season	Division	Apps	Goals	Apps	Goals	Apps	Goals	Apps	Goals	Apps	Goals
Universidad Concepción	2008	Primera División of Chile	?	1	0	0	—				?	1
Universidad de Chile	2009	Primera División of Chile	28	1	0	0	—		15	0	43	1
Toluca	2009–10	Mexican Primera División	19	2	0	0	—		3	0	22	2
Toluca	2010–11	Mexican Primera División	27	2	0	0	—		8	1	35	3
Toluca	Total		46	4	0	0	0	0	11	1	57	5
Universidad de Chile	2011	Primera División of Chile	19	1	0	0	—		12	1	31	2
Universidad de Chile	2012	Primera División of Chile	32	0	3	0	—		16	1	51	1
Universidad de Chile	2013	Primera División of Chile	4	0	0	0	—		1	0	5	0
Universidad de Chile	2013–14	Primera División of Chile	23	0	2	0	—		11	0	36	0
Universidad de Chile	2014–15	Primera División of Chile	26	0	1	0	—		4	0	31	0
Universidad de Chile	2015–16	Primera División of Chile	24	0	11	0	—		2	0	37	0
Universidad de Chile	Total		128	1	17	0	0	0	46	2	191	3
Toluca	2016–17	Liga MX	34	0	3	0	—				37	0
Toluca	2017–18	Liga MX	28	2	9	0	—				37	2
Toluca	Total		62	2	12	0	0	0	0	0	74	2
Career totals			292	10	29	0	0	0	72	3	393	13

=== International ===
Appearances and goals by national team and year
National team	Year	Apps	Goals
Chile	2008	3	0
Chile	2009	–	
Chile	2010	3	0
Chile	2011	1	0
Chile	2012	5	0
Chile	2013	–	
Chile	2014	1	0
Chile	2015	1	0
Total		14	0

== Honours ==
Universidad de Chile

- Primera División de Chile (4): 2009–A, 2011–C, 2012–A, 2014–A
- Copa Chile (1): 2012–13, 2015
- Copa Sudamericana (1): 2011
- Supercopa de Chile (1): 2015

Toluca

- Liga MX (1): 2010 Torneo Bicentenario

Universidad de Concepción

- Primera B de Chile (1): 2025
