= Héctor Acosta (footballer, born 1991) =

Mexican footballer

Personal information
- Full name: Héctor Acosta Quintero
- Date of birth: 24 November 1991 (age 34)
- Place of birth: San Martín de Hidalgo, Jalisco, Mexico
- Height: 1.78 m (5 ft 10 in)
- Position: Right back

Youth career
- 2007–2010: Deportivo Toluca

Senior career*
Years	Team	Apps	(Gls)
2010–2019	Toluca	25	(0)
2014–2016	→ Santos Laguna (loan)	1	(0)
2016	→ Alebrijes de Oaxaca (loan)	1	(0)
2016–2017	→ Venados (loan)	25	(0)
2017–2018	→ Atlético San Luis (loan)	11	(0)
2019–2020	→ Venados (loan)	7	(0)
2020	Industriales Naucalpan F.C.	0	(0)
2021	Real Tlamazolan	0	(0)

International career
2011	Mexico U20	4	(0)
- * Club domestic league appearances and goals as of 19:35, 23 September 2019 (UTC)

Héctor Acosta Quintero (born 24 November 1991) is a Mexican footballer who plays as a right back for Venados.

== Honours ==
Santos Laguna

- Liga MX: Clausura 2015
- Campeon de Campeones: 2015
