= Javier Güémez =

Mexican footballer (born 1991)

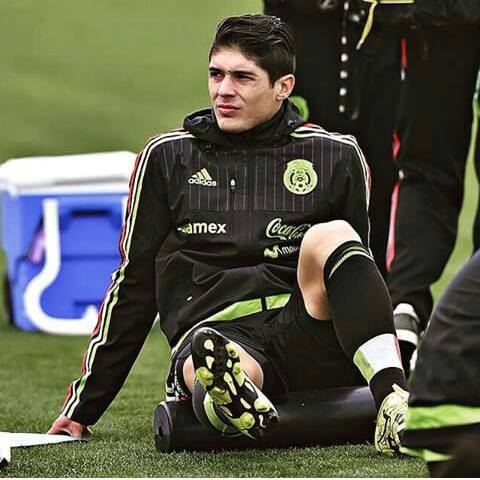
- Güémez in 2015

Personal information
- Full name: Javier Güémez López
- Date of birth: 17 October 1991 (age 35)
- Place of birth: Culiacán, Sinaloa, Mexico
- Height: 1.74 m (5 ft 8 1/2 in)
- Position: Defensive midfielder

Team information
- Current team: Santos Laguna
- Number: 6

Youth career
- 2007–2012: Sinaloa

Senior career*
Years	Team	Apps	(Gls)
2010–2013	Sinaloa	66	(1)
2013–2015	Tijuana	65	(2)
2015–2017	América	30	(0)
2017–2019	Querétaro	63	(3)
2020–2021	Toluca	23	(2)
2020–2021	→ Atlético San Luis (loan)	17	(0)
2021–2024	Atlético San Luis	130	(6)
2025–	Santos Laguna	54	(2)

International career
2014–2018	Mexico	15	(0)
- * Club domestic league appearances and goals as of 6 November 2026

Javier Güémez López (born 17 October 1991) is a Mexican professional footballer who plays as a defensive midfielder for Liga MX club Santos Laguna.

== Club career ==
=== Youth career ===
Güémez first joined Dorados youth academy in 2007. Continuing through Dorados de Sinaloa Youth Academy successfully going through Dorados de Sinaloa Premier. Until finally reaching the first team, Francisco Palacios Tamayo being the coach promoting Güémez to first team.

=== Sinaloa ===
Born in Culiacán, Sinaloa, Güémez began his career with local club Dorados in 2010. On August 1, 2010, Güémez made his Ascenso MX debut against La Piedad ending in a 2–1 loss. He played a total of 66 league matches for the club.

=== Tijuana ===
Güémez was then transferred to Club Tijuana in 2013. On August 9, 2013, Güémez made his competitive Liga MX debut against UNAM ending in a 2–0 win.

=== América ===
On 5 June 2015, Güémez was announced as the new signing for Club América for the Apertura 2015 campaign.

=== Querétaro ===
On 6 June 2017 Querétaro officially signed Güémez. Güémez made his debut appearance with the club on July 22, 2017, against his former team Club América which ended in a 1–0 win.

=== Toluca ===
On 20 December 2019, it was announced that Güémez would join Toluca for the Clausura 2020 tournament.

== International career ==
On 1 October 2014, Güémez was called to the senior national team for friendlies against Honduras and Panama.

On 5 October 2015, Güémez was called to replace Giovani dos Santos for the 2015 CONCACAF Cup squad.

== Career statistics ==
=== International ===
As of match played on 17 November 2018

Mexico
Year	Apps	Goals
2014	2	0
2015	11	0
2018	2	0
Total	15	0

== Honours ==
América

- CONCACAF Champions League: 2015–16

Mexico

- CONCACAF Cup: 2015
