= Adrián Mora =

Mexican footballer (born 1997)

Personal information
- Full name: Adrián Mora Barraza
- Date of birth: 15 August 1997 (age 29)
- Place of birth: Parral, Chihuahua, Mexico
- Height: 1.92 m (6 ft 4 in)
- Position: Centre-back

Team information
- Current team: Atlas
- Number: 4

Youth career
- 2017–2018: Toluca

Senior career*
Years	Team	Apps	(Gls)
2018–2025	Toluca	54	(2)
2021	→ Monterrey (loan)	1	(0)
2021–2023	→ Juárez (loan)	19	(0)
2024–2025	→ Atlas (loan)	17	(0)
2025–	Atlas	17	(2)

International career^{‡}
2019–2021	Mexico U23	5	(0)
Medal record
Men's football
Representing Mexico
Olympic Games
Bronze medal – third place	2020 Tokyo	Team
Toulon Tournament
Third place	2019 France	Team
- * Club domestic league appearances and goals as of 12 September 2026 ‡ National team caps and goals as of 3 August 2021

Adrián Mora Barraza (born 15 August 1997) is a Mexican professional footballer who plays as a centre-back for Liga MX club Atlas.

== Club career ==
=== Toluca ===
Mora joined Toluca for the Apertura 2018 tournament from the team's Youth System. He made his professional debut on 5 September 2019 in a Copa MX match against Tijuana, where he also scored his first professional career goal.

On 14 September 2018, Mora made his league debut for Toluca against Veracruz. On that same match, he scored the first goal of his Liga MX career.

Mora was signed by Tigres UANL for the Apertura 2019 tournament, but on 27 June 2019 he was bought back by Toluca after the team paid 2 million dollars for the player.

== International career ==
Mora was part of the under-22 squad that competed at the 2019 Toulon Tournament, where Mexico finished in third in the tournament.

Mora was called up to participate in the 2020 Summer Olympics, replacing José Juan Macías who withdrew due to injury. He won the bronze medal with the Olympic team.

== Career statistics ==
=== Club ===
As of match played on 12 September 2026

Club	Season	League			Cup		Continental		Other		Total	
Club	Season	Division	Apps	Goals	Apps	Goals	Apps	Goals	Apps	Goals	Apps	Goals
Toluca	2017–18	Liga MX	—		2	0	—		—		2	0
Toluca	2018–19	Liga MX	16	2	1	1	1 (Note: Appearances in CONCACAF Champions League)	0	—		18	3
Toluca	2019–20	Liga MX	17	0	3	0	—		—		20	0
Toluca	2020–21	Liga MX	15	0	3 (Note: Appearances in Copa GNP por México)	0	—		—		18	0
Toluca	2023–24	Liga MX	6	0	—		—		1 (Note: Appearances in Leagues Cup)	0	7	0
Toluca	Total		54	2	9	1	1	0	1	0	65	3
Monterrey (loan)	2020–21	Liga MX	1	0	—		2	0	—		3	0
Juárez (loan)	2021–22	Liga MX	14	0	—		—		—		14	0
Juárez (loan)	2022–23	Liga MX	5	0	—		—		—		5	0
Juárez (loan)	Total		19	0	—		—		—		19	0
Atlas (loan)	2024–25	Liga MX	17	0	—		—		3	0	20	0
Atlas	2025–26	Liga MX	16	2	—		—		2	0	18	2
Atlas	2026–27	Liga MX	1	0	—		—		—		1	0
Atlas	Total		17	2	—		—		2	0	19	2
Career total			108	4	9	1	3	0	6	0	126	5

== Honours ==
Mexico U23

- Olympic Bronze Medal: 2020
