= Rodrigo Salinas (footballer, born 1988) =

Mexican footballer

Personal information
- Full name: Rodrigo Salinas Dorantes
- Date of birth: 9 May 1988 (age 38)
- Place of birth: Puebla, Mexico
- Height: 1.80 m (5 ft 11 in)
- Position: Right-back

Senior career*
| Years | Team | Apps | (Gls) |
| 2008–2014 | Puebla | 118 | (2) |
| 2012–2014 | → Morelia (loan) | 54 | (3) |
| 2014–2015 | Pachuca | 29 | (1) |
| 2015–2017 | Tijuana | 9 | (0) |
| 2016 | → Atlas (loan) | 15 | (1) |
| 2017 | → Toluca (loan) | 21 | (1) |
| 2018–2021 | Toluca | 110 | (6) |
| 2020 | → Pachuca (loan) | 11 | (0) |
- * Club domestic league appearances and goals as of 18 October 2021

Rodrigo Salinas Dorantes (born 9 May 1988) is a Mexican professional footballer who plays as a right-back.

== Professional career ==
Rodrigo Salinas was born in Puebla on 9 May 1988. He spent most of his teen years in the Puebla youth system. He made his first division debut with Puebla on 17 August 2008 in a match again Toluca which the club lost 3–1. He managed to score his first goal on 20 October 2010 in the Apertura 2010 against Querétaro F.C. in the 70-minute. He has Played with Puebla FC since the 2008 Apertura.

On 13 December 2017, Salinas signed a contract with Toluca, after being on loan for two tournament.

== Style of play ==
He is described as a very quick player who plays with enthusiasm and has caught the attention of several top clubs in Mexico and was rumoured to sign with C.F. Pachuca in 2011 but the negotiation failed because Puebla would only send him out on loan.

== Honours ==
Monarcas Morelia

- Copa MX: Apertura 2013
