= Alexis Canelo =

Argentine footballer (born 1992)

Personal information
- Full name: Pedro Alexis Canelo
- Date of birth: February 3, 1992 (age 34)
- Place of birth: San Miguel de Tucumán, Argentina
- Height: 1.78 m (5 ft 10 in)
- Position: Forward

Team information
- Current team: Atletico Tucuman
- Number: 14

Senior career*
Years	Team	Apps	(Gls)
2012–2015	Almirante Brown	66	(14)
2015	→ Quilmes (loan)	23	(4)
2016–2017	Chiapas	14	(2)
2016–2017	Puebla	24	(6)
2017–2022	Toluca	140	(45)
2022–2023	Club Tijuana	37	(6)
2023–2025	Independiente	36	(6)
2025	Lanús	26	(1)
2026	Puebla	6	(0)
2026–	Atletico Tucuman	9	(2)
- * Club domestic league appearances and goals as of 17:43, 9 November 2026 (UTC)

Pedro Alexis Canelo (born 3 February 1992) is an Argentine professional footballer who plays as a forward for Argentine First Division club Atletico Tucuman.

== Career ==
=== Chiapas F.C. ===
On 5 January 2016, Canelo joined Chiapas of Mexico for an undisclosed fee.

=== Toluca ===
Canelo joined Deportivo Toluca for the Liga MX Clausura 2017 after former striker Enrique Triverio joined Racing Club de Avellaneda of Argentina. On September 17, he scored his first two goals for Toluca against Querétaro.

== Career statistics ==
As of match played on 15 April 2018

Appearances and goals by club, season and competition
Club	Season	League			National Cup		League Cup		Other		Total	
Club	Season	Division	Apps	Goals	Apps	Goals	Apps	Goals	Apps	Goals	Apps	Goals
Almirante Brown	2011–12	Primera B Nacional	2	1	1	0	—				3	1
Almirante Brown	2012–13	Primera B Nacional	13	1	1	0	—				14	1
Almirante Brown	2013–14	Primera B Nacional	33	5	1	0	—				34	5
Almirante Brown	2014	Primera B Metropolitana	18	7	1	0	—				19	7
Almirante Brown	Total		66	14	4	0	0	0	0	0	70	14
Quilmes (loan)	2015	Argentine Primera División	23	4	3	2	—				26	6
Chiapas	2015–16	Liga MX	14	2	6	2	—				20	4
Puebla	2016–17	Liga MX	24	6	3	2	—				27	8
Toluca	2017–18	Liga MX	31	8	11	10	—				42	18
Career totals			158	34	27	16	0	0	0	0	185	50

== Honours ==
Lanús

- Copa Sudamericana: 2025

Individual

- Liga MX Top scorer: Clausura 2021
- Copa MX Top scorer: Clausura 2018
- Liga MX Golden Boot: Guardianes 2021
- Liga MX All-Star: 2021
