= Amaury Escoto =

Mexican footballer (born 1992)

Personal information
- Full name: Amaury Gabriel Escoto Ruiz
- Date of birth: 30 November 1992 (age 33)
- Place of birth: Zapopan, Jalisco, Mexico
- Height: 1.80 m (5 ft 11 in)
- Position: Forward

Team information
- Current team: Atlético Ottawa
- Number: 9

Youth career
- 2009–2012: Querétaro

Senior career*
Years	Team	Apps	(Gls)
2011–2014	Querétaro	57	(11)
2015	→ UANL (loan)	3	(0)
2016	→ Cafetaleros (loan)	11	(1)
2016	Suchitepéquez	16	(6)
2017–2018	BUAP	52	(13)
2018	→ Toluca (loan)	8	(0)
2019–2020	Sinaloa	32	(10)
2020–2022	Puebla	64	(5)
2023	Celaya	18	(10)
2023–2024	Juárez	15	(2)
2024	→ El Paso Locomotive (loan)	6	(0)
2025–2026	Tepatitlán	33	(19)
2026–	Atlético Ottawa	0	(0)
- * Club domestic league appearances and goals as of 16 September 2026

Amaury Gabriel Escoto Ruiz (born 30 November 1992) is a Mexican professional footballer who plays as a forward for Atlético Ottawa of the Canadian Premier League.

== Career ==
=== Querétaro F.C. ===
Born in Zapopan, Escoto made his professional debut for Querétaro F.C. on 30 April 2011 against Chiapas. He came on in the 75th minute for Efraín Cortés as Querétaro lost 4–1. He then scored his first goal for the club on 5 January 2013 against Club León in which his 90th-minute strike earned Querétaro a 2–2 draw.

== Career statistics ==
As of 19 October 2024

Club	Season	League			League cup		National cup (Note: Includes appearances in Copa MX)		Continental (Note: Includes appearances in Copa Libertadores, CONCACAF Champions League, and Leagues Cup)		Total	
Club	Season	Division	Apps	Goals	Apps	Goals	Apps	Goals	Apps	Goals	Apps	Goals
Querétaro	2010–11	Liga MX	1	0	0	0	0	0	—	—	1	0
Querétaro	2011–12	Liga MX	2	0	0	0	0	0	—	—	2	0
Querétaro	2012–13	Liga MX	16	4	0	0	4	0	—	—	20	4
Querétaro	2013–14	Liga MX	23	0	0	0	6	1	—	—	29	1
Querétaro	2014–15	Liga MX	2	0	0	0	5	0	—	—	7	0
Querétaro	Career total		44	4	0	0	15	1	0	0	59	5
Tigres UANL (loan)	2014–15	Liga MX	0	0	0	0	0	0	—	—	0	0
Tigres UANL (loan)	2015–16	Liga MX	3	0	0	0	0	0	4	1	7	1
Tigres UANL (loan)	Career total		3	0	0	0	0	0	4	1	7	1
Chiapas (loan)	2015–16	Ascenso MX	11	1	0	0	6	2	–	–	17	3
Suchitepéquez	2016-17	Liga Nacional	16	6	0	0	6	2	3	1	25	9
Suchitepéquez	Career total		27	7	0	0	12	4	3	1	42	11
Lobos BUAP	2016-17	Ascenso MX	25	9	0	0	0	0	–	–	25	9
Lobos BUAP	2017-18	Liga MX	27	4	0	0	3	0	–	–	30	4
Lobos BUAP	Career total		52	13	0	0	3	0	0	0	55	13
Toluca (loan)	2018-19	Liga MX	8	0	0	0	3	2	–	–	11	2
Dorados	2018-19	Ascenso MX	18	5	0	0	6	2	–	–	24	7
Dorados	2019-20	Ascenso MX	14	5	0	0	6	3	–	–	20	8
Dorados	Career total		40	10	0	0	12	5	0	0	52	15
Puebla	2020-21	Liga MX	36	3	0	0	0	0	–	–	36	3
Puebla	2021-22	Liga MX	17	1	0	0	0	0	–	–	17	1
Puebla	2022-23	Liga MX	11	1	0	0	0	0	–	–	11	1
Celaya	2022-23	Liga de Expansión MX	18	10	0	0	0	0	–	–	18	10
Celaya	Career total		82	15	0	0	0	0	0	0	82	15
Juárez	2023-24	Liga MX	15	2	0	0	0	0	3	1	18	3
Juárez	2024-25	Liga MX	0	0	0	0	0	0	0	0	0	0
El Paso Locomotive (loan)	2024	USL Championship	4	0	0	0	0	0	–	–	4	0
El Paso Locomotive (loan)	Career total		19	2	0	0	0	0	3	1	21	3
Career total			267	51	0	0	42	10	10	3	319	64

== Honours ==
Tigres UANL

- Liga MX: Apertura 2015
- Copa Libertadores: Runners Up 2015

BUAP

- Ascenso MX: Clausura 2017

Individual

- Liga MX Goal of the Tournament: 2017–18
- CONCACAF Goal of the Year: 2017
