= Fernando Tobio =

Argentine footballer (born 1989)

Personal information
- Full name: Omar Fernando Tobio
- Date of birth: October 18, 1989 (age 37)
- Place of birth: Ramos Mejía, Argentina
- Height: 1.85 m (6 ft 1 in)
- Position: Centre-back

Team information
- Current team: Barracas Central
- Number: 32

Youth career
- Vélez Sársfield

Senior career*
Years	Team	Apps	(Gls)
2008–2014	Vélez Sársfield	117	(3)
2014–2018	Palmeiras	33	(1)
2015–2016	→ Boca Juniors (loan)	24	(0)
2016–2017	→ Boca Juniors (loan)	13	(0)
2017–2018	→ Rosario Central (loan)	20	(1)
2018–2020	Toluca	37	(2)
2020–2022	Estudiantes	10	(0)
2022–2025	Huracán	88	(3)
2025–	Barracas Central	40	(4)

International career
2009	Argentina U20	9	(0)
- * Club domestic league appearances and goals as of 17:11, 3 June 2026 (UTC)

Omar Fernando Tobio (born October 18, 1989) is an Argentine professional footballer who plays as a centre-back for Barracas Central.

== Club career ==
Tobio made his debut for Vélez Sársfield on March 1, 2008. In 2009, he was part of the squad that won the Clausura tournament, though he did not play any games. He did however play 8 games in Vélez' following league title, the 2011 Clausura, mainly as a backup for the starting centre backs Sebastián Domínguez and Fernando Ortiz. He also finished the tournament as a starter, replacing injured Fabián Cubero as a right full back; and played 5 games in the 2011 Copa Libertadores, scoring one goal in the semi-finals against Peñarol.

After Fernando Ortiz's departure from Vélez following the 2011–12 season, Tobio became a regular starter in Vélez's first team, playing alongside Sebastián Domínguez as centre backs, and helping the team obtain the 2012 Inicial league title.

== International career ==
In January 2009, Tobio was called for the Argentina under-20 squad that played the South American Youth Championship in Venezuela. He played all 9 games as the team finished 6th, failing to qualify for the U-20 World Cup.

In November 2010, Tobio was selected as part of an Argentine league squad to train twice weekly with the Argentina national team.

== Honours ==
Vélez Sársfield

- Argentine Primera División: 2009 Clausura, 2011 Clausura, 2012 Inicial, 2012–13 Superfinal
- Supercopa Argentina: 2013

Boca Juniors

- Argentine Primera División: 2015, 2016–17
- Copa Argentina: 2015
