= Alan Medina =

Mexican footballer (born 1997)

Personal information
- Full name: Alan Medina Camacho
- Date of birth: 19 August 1997 (age 29)
- Place of birth: Culiacán, Sinaloa, Mexico
- Height: 1.82 m (6 ft 0 in)
- Position: Winger

Team information
- Current team: Pumas
- Number: 22

Senior career*
Years	Team	Apps	(Gls)
2017–2020	Toluca	33	(4)
2021–2024	América	6	(0)
2021–2022	→ Necaxa (loan)	27	(2)
2022–2023	→ Juárez (loan)	30	(6)
2023–2024	→ Mazatlán (loan)	25	(0)
2024–2026	Querétaro	24	(0)
2025–2026	→ Pumas (loan)	25	(4)
2026–	Pumas	20	(0)

International career^{‡}
2019	Mexico U22	3	(0)
Medal record
Men's football
Representing Mexico
Toulon Tournament
Third place	2019 France	Team
- * Club domestic league appearances and goals as of 21 November 2026 ‡ National team caps and goals as of 10 September 2020

Alan Medina Camacho (born 19 August 1997) is a Mexican professional footballer who plays as a winger for Liga MX club Pumas.

== Club career ==
On 1 January 2021, Medina joined Liga MX club América.

== International career ==
In May 2019, Medina was called up by Jaime Lozano to participate in that year's Toulon Tournament, where Mexico finished third in the tournament.

== Career statistics ==
As of match played on 21 November 2026

Club	Season	League			Cup		Continental		Other		Total	
Club	Season	Division	Apps	Goals	Apps	Goals	Apps	Goals	Apps	Goals	Apps	Goals
Toluca	2018–19	Liga MX	13	2	1	0	1 (Note: Appearances in CONCACAF Champions League)	0	—		15	2
Toluca	2019–20	Liga MX	5	1	1	0	—		—		6	1
Toluca	2020–21	Liga MX	15	1	—		—		—		15	1
Toluca	Total		33	4	2	0	1	0	—		36	4
América	2020–21	Liga MX	6	0	—		1	0	—		7	0
Necaxa (loan)	2021–22	Liga MX	27	2	—		—		—		27	2
Juárez (loan)	2022–23	Liga MX	30	6	—		—		—		30	6
Mazatlán (loan)	2023–24	Liga MX	25	0	—		—		3 (Note: Appearances in Leagues Cup)	0	28	0
Querétaro	2024–25	Liga MX	20	0	—		—		2	0	22	0
Querétaro	2025–26	Liga MX	4	0	—		—		2	0	6	0
Querétaro	Total		24	0	—		—		4	0	28	0
Pumas (loan)	2025–26	Liga MX	25	4	—		2	0	—		27	4
Pumas	2025–26	Liga MX	4	0	—		—		—		4	0
Pumas	2026–27	Liga MX	16	0	—		—		3	0	19	0
Pumas	Total		20	0	—		—		3	0	23	0
Career total			190	16	2	0	4	0	10	0	206	16
