= Adolfo Domínguez (footballer) =

Mexican footballer (born 1991)

Personal information
- Full name: Adolfo Domínguez Gerardo
- Date of birth: 12 February 1991 (age 35)
- Place of birth: Mexicali, Baja California, Mexico
- Height: 1.81 m (5 ft 11 in)
- Position: Midfielder

Team information
- Current team: Venados
- Number: 10

Youth career
- 2007: Pioneros Del Valle
- 2011–2012: Tijuana

Senior career*
Years	Team	Apps	(Gls)
2012	Tijuana	0	(0)
2013–2020	Sinaloa	71	(0)
2016	→ Juárez (loan)	6	(0)
2017–2018	→ Cafetaleros (loan)	33	(9)
2018–2019	→ Toluca (loan)	13	(0)
2020	Chapulineros de Oaxaca	0	(0)
2021–2022	Sinaloa	71	(4)
2022–2025	Celaya	105	(16)
2025–	Venados	35	(2)
- * Club domestic league appearances and goals as of 9 September 2026

Adolfo Domínguez Gerardo (born 10 February 1991) is a Mexican professional footballer who plays as a midfielder for Liga de Expansión MX club Venados.

== Honours ==
Cafetaleros

- Ascenso MX: Clausura 2018
