= Luis Ángel Mendoza =

Mexican footballer (born 1990)

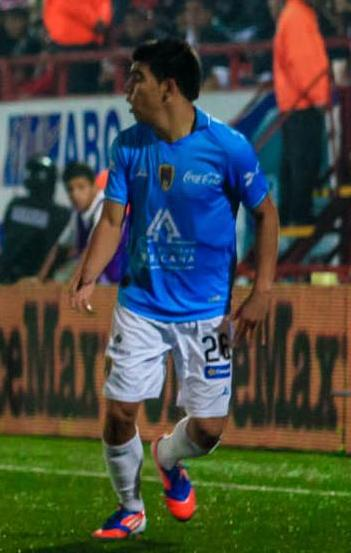
- Mendoza with San Luis in 2012

Personal information
- Full name: Luis Ángel Mendoza Escamilla
- Date of birth: 3 February 1990 (age 36)
- Place of birth: Monterrey, Nuevo León, Mexico
- Height: 1.73 m (5 ft 8 in)
- Position: Winger

Senior career*
Years	Team	Apps	(Gls)
2009–2010	Tigres UANL	6	(0)
2011–2012	La Piedad	21	(2)
2012–2013	San Luis	31	(4)
2013–2014	América	53	(7)
2015–2016	Santos Laguna	40	(1)
2016–2017	Chiapas	26	(2)
2017–2018	Tijuana	26	(3)
2018–2019	Toluca	31	(3)
2019–2020	Morelia	30	(4)
2020–2021	Mazatlán	33	(1)
2021–2022	Cruz Azul	7	(0)
2022	FAS	14	(3)
2023	FAS	19	(2)

International career
2013	Mexico	0	(0)
- * Club domestic league appearances and goals as of 8 December 2022

Luis Ángel Mendoza Escamilla (born 3 February 1990), also known as El Quick, is a Mexican professional footballer who plays as a winger.

== Club career ==
Mendoza made his debut with Tigres UANL on 18 February 2010, against Santos Laguna, coming on as a substitute. He played in five more games, starting once and afterwards he was sent to Ascenso MX club La Piedad. For the Apertura 2012, Mendoza signed with San Luis.

=== Club América ===
Mendoza's consistency and good performances earned the attention of América, whom he eventually signed for prior to the Apertura 2013 tournament. Mendoza made his debut on 31 July 2013, against León, and eventually became an undisputed starter in the club's starting-eleven. His best performance of the tournament came on 24 August against Morelia, where he scored a brace and had an assist in América's 3–1 victory in the Estadio Azteca. On 14 December 2014, Mendoza received a red card for mocking his opponents in the Liga MX final against Tigres UANL in which his team won 3–0.

== International career ==
In October 2013, Mendoza received his first call up to the senior national team (managed by former Club América coach Miguel Herrera) for a friendly against Finland and the two-legged 2014 FIFA World Cup playoff against New Zealand, although he did not play in any of the three matches.

== Honours ==
América

- Liga MX: Apertura 2014
- CONCACAF Champions League: 2014–15

Santos Laguna

- Liga MX: Clausura 2015
- Campeón de Campeones: 2015

Cruz Azul

- Campeón de Campeones: 2021

FAS

- Salvadoran Primera División: Apertura 2022
