= William da Silva (footballer) =

Brazilian-Mexican footballer (born 1986)

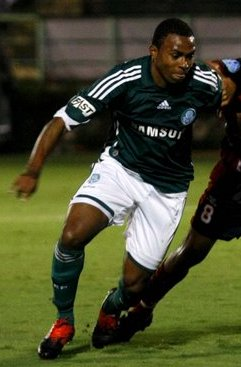
- William with Palmeiras in 2010

Personal information
- Full name: William Fernando da Silva
- Date of birth: 20 November 1986 (age 39)
- Place of birth: São Paulo, Brazil
- Height: 1.75 m (5 ft 9 in)
- Position: Defensive midfielder

Youth career
- 1999–2001: Juventus-SP
- 2001: Corinthians
- 2002–2005: Palmeiras

Senior career*
Years	Team	Apps	(Gls)
2006–2012	Palmeiras B	?	(?)
2006–2012	Palmeiras	49	(6)
2008	→ Ipatinga (loan)	5	(0)
2008–2009	→ Náutico (loan)	19	(0)
2009–2010	→ Vitória (loan)	36	(2)
2010	→ Goiás (loan)	0	(0)
2010–2011	→ Atlético Goianiense (loan)	20	(2)
2011–2012	→ Náutico (loan)	19	(3)
2012–2013	Joinville	19	(6)
2013–2014	Busan IPark	25	(2)
2014–2015	Querétaro	72	(13)
2016–2018	América	102	(8)
2018–2021	Toluca	73	(8)
2021	São Paulo	9	(0)
2022–2023	CSA	13	(0)
- * Club domestic league appearances and goals as of 15 April 2024

William Fernando da Silva (born 20 November 1986), known simply as William da Silva or William, is a Brazilian former professional footballer who played as a defensive midfielder. He also holds Mexican citizenship.

== Career ==
Da Silva began his career Palmeiras, signing a five-year contract with the club in 2003. He made his professional debut for Palmeiras in a 0–1 home defeat to Grêmio in the Campeonato Brasileiro on 28 May 2006. Since 2008 he had been loaned out to other Brazilian clubs. His contract was also extended until June 2011. It was renewed again in 2010. He was injured in June and missed the rest of the season.

In July 2012, William moved to Série B team Joinville Esporte Clube on a free transfer. The following year, William joined Busan IPark of South Korea. He made his debut in a 2–2 draw against Gangwon FC on 3 March 2013, and scored his first goal against FC Seoul two weeks later.

In 2014, da Silva signed with Mexican side Quéretaro. While at Querétaro he would reach the finals of the 2015 Clausura tournament, finishing runners-up to Santos Laguna.

On 9 December 2015, it was announced that da Silva was sold to Club América, signing a three-year contract. He called the move to América "one of the most important challenges of my career", and a "dream realized".

== Post career ==
William da Silva became the president of ECUS Suzano in 2024.

== Honours ==
São Paulo

- Campeonato Paulista: 2021
