= Felipe Pardo =

Colombian footballer (born 1990)

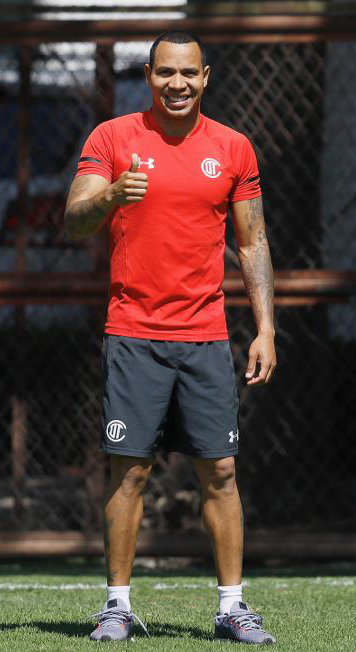
- Pardo in 2019

Personal information
- Full name: Édgar Felipe Pardo Castro
- Date of birth: August 17, 1990 (age 36)
- Place of birth: Quibdó, Colombia
- Height: 1.79 m (5 ft 10 in)
- Positions: Winger; forward

Team information
- Current team: Alianza
- Number: 17

Youth career
- 2006–2008: Deportivo Cali
- 2008–2009: Atlético Huila

Senior career*
Years	Team	Apps	(Gls)
2009–2013	Independiente Medellín	116	(11)
2013–2015	Braga	56	(14)
2015–2019	Olympiacos	49	(6)
2017	→ Nantes (loan)	13	(1)
2019–2021	Toluca	38	(6)
2020–2021	→ Pachuca (loan)	37	(2)
2022–2023	Independiente Medellín	42	(7)
2024	Águilas Doradas	12	(1)
2024	Deportivo Táchira	12	(3)
2025–	Alianza	27	(7)

International career^{‡}
2007	Colombia U17	4	(1)
2015–2017	Colombia	3	(1)
- * Club domestic league appearances and goals as of 12 December 2025 ‡ National team caps and goals as of 14 November 2017 (UTC)

Édgar Felipe "Pipe" Pardo Castro (born 17 August 1990) is a Colombian professional footballer who currently plays for Alianza.

== Club career ==
=== Early years ===
Pardo began his professional career with Atlético Huila in 2007 before being loaned out to Deportivo Cali for the first half of the 2009 season. He scored his first goal with Deportivo Cali against Independiente Medellín in a 3–1 league win.

In July 2009, he was loaned out to Independiente Medellin. On 6 August, he scored his first goals for El Poderoso, a brace in an El Clásico Paisa victory. In December, he was part of the squad that won the 2009 Finalizacion tournament, and the club signed him on a three-year contract a few days after winning the title. In March 2013, he left the club after almost four years.

=== Braga ===
On 16 April 2013, Pardo joined Braga for an approximated €600,000 transfer fee signing a four-year contract. He completed his first season in Portugal's top flight, the Primeira Liga, with 9 goals and 5 assists in 41 appearances, establishing himself as a dependable option on the right flank of the attack. He finished the 2014–15 season with 35 appearances, scoring 10 goals and making 9 assists, including a brace in a 4–0 victory over Penafiel.

Pardo was an important player for the club in their run to the 2015 Taça de Portugal final, scoring his team's second goal in the fourth round victory over Vitoria Guimaraes, followed by a winning goal over defending champions Benfica in the round of 16, and then a goal in the QF, a 7–1 victory over Os Belenenses.

=== Olympiacos ===
On 17 July 2015, after two years of exceptional football in the Portuguese top flight, he transferred to Olympiacos, for a fee of €4.5 million. The transfer was announced on Olympiacos' website on 18 July.

On 16 September 2015, Pardo made his debut in Champions League, playing in a 3–0 home defeat against Bayern Munich. On 29 September, he contributed to a shock 3–2 away win against Arsenal in the Champions League, scoring the opener and assisting Alfreð Finnbogason to seal the win. On 4 November, Pardo came off the bench to inspire a comeback victory against Dinamo Zagreb in Piraeus, scoring twice with the second goal coming in the 90th minute. His performance earned him a place among the Champions League team of the week. On 3 January 2016, he scored his first goal in Greek Super League and assisted Brown Ideye for the winning goal in a 3–1 away win against Panionios. He was also named "Man of the Match".

==== Nantes (loan) ====
On 11 January 2017, Pardo joined Nantes on loan for the second half of the season.

==== Back to Olympiacos ====
In the summer of 2017 Pardo returned to Olympiacos. On the last day of the summer transfer window, Argentinian club Independiente made a €2.6 million offer for the Colombian, but Olympiacos declined the offer, as coach Besnik Hasi desired to maintain the player in the team roster.

On 12 September 2017, he scored twice having come on as a substitute in a 3–2 Champions League Group stage loss against Sporting CP at the Karaiskakis Stadium, becoming only the fourth player in Champions League history to score a brace in the same match coming off the bench. On 5 November, he scored a brace in a 5–1 home Super League win against Platanias.

Pardo's playing time in the 2018–19 season was heavily reduced due to being unfavored by head coach Pedro Martins, only making two appearances in six months.

=== Toluca ===
On 2 January 2019, Pardo left Olympiacos after three and a half years and 77 caps, 15 goals, 13 assists in all competitions and joined Deportivo Toluca of Liga MX.

=== Return to Independiente Medellín ===
On 1 January 2022, he returned to his first club as a professional, Independiente Medellín. He scored his first goal on 25 January during a 1–0 victory at home to Deportes Tolima in the league's first matchday.

=== Aguilas Doradas ===
In January 2024, he joined Aguilas Doradas to dispute the 2024 Apertura tournament on a six-month contract, making 12 appearances and scoring once in a 2–1 defeat at the hands of Deportes Tolima.

=== Deportivo Tachira ===
In July 2024, Pardo joined Deportivo Tachira of the Venezuelan Primera División.

== International career ==
Pardo played with the Colombia national u-17 team at the 2007 FIFA U-17 World Cup, scoring once in a 5–0 win against Trinidad and Tobago.

On 7 November 2015 Pardo's performances for Olympiacos led to his first call up to the Colombia national team for the qualifying games for the 2018 FIFA World Cup qualification. On 14 November 2017, he scored his first goal for the national team, opening the scoring in a 4–0 friendly victory against China.

=== International goals ===
Scores and results list Colombia's goal tally first.

No	Date	Venue	Opponent	Score	Result	Competition
1.	14 November 2017	Chongqing Olympic Sports Center, Chongqing, China	China	1–0	4–0	Friendly

== Career statistics ==
Club	Season	League			Cup		Continental		Total	
Club	Season	Division	Apps	Goals	Apps	Goals	Apps	Goals	Apps	Goals
Atlético Huila	2007	Categoría Primera A	10	4	—		—		10	4
Atlético Huila	2008	Categoría Primera A	25	4	0	0	—		25	4
Atlético Huila	Total		35	8	0	0	0	0	35	8
Deportivo Cali	2009	Categoría Primera A	17	2	1	1	—		18	3
Independiente Medellín	2009	Categoría Primera A	21	3	4	2	0	0	25	5
Independiente Medellín	2010	Categoría Primera A	34	1	0	0	6	1	40	2
Independiente Medellín	2011	Categoría Primera A	24	1	4	2	—		28	3
Independiente Medellín	2012	Categoría Primera A	36	7	4	2	—		40	9
Independiente Medellín	2013	Categoría Primera A	14	2	6	0	—		20	2
Independiente Medellín	2022	Categoría Primera A	42	5	3	0	5	0	50	5
Independiente Medellín	Total		171	19	21	6	11	1	203	26
Braga	2013-14	Primeira Liga	30	7	9	2	2	0	41	9
Braga	2014-15	Primeira Liga	27	7	8	3	0	0	35	10
Braga	Total		57	14	17	5	2	0	76	19
Olympiacos	2015-16	Super League Greece	21	4	5	1	6	3	32	8
Olympiacos	2016-17	Super League Greece	6	0	3	3	2	0	11	3
Olympiacos	2017-18	Super League Greece	20	3	3	0	8	2	31	5
Olympiacos	2018-19	Super League Greece	1	0	1	0	0	0	2	0
Olympiacos	Total		48	7	12	4	16	5	76	16
Nantes	2016-17	Ligue 1	13	1	1	0	0	0	14	1
Toluca	2018-19	Liga MX	10	3	0	0	1	0	11	3
Toluca	2019-20	Liga MX	27	3	5	1	0	0	32	4
Toluca	Total		37	6	5	1	1	0	43	7
Pachuca	2020-21	Liga MX	37	2	0	0	0	0	37	2
Total career			415	59	57	17	30	6	502	82

== Personal life ==
Pardo is known by the nickname Pipe, which is short for Felipe.

== Honours ==
=== Club ===
Independiente Medellín

- Categoría Primera A: 2009 Clausura

Braga

- Taça de Portugal runner-up: 2014–15

Olympiacos

- Super League Greece: 2015–16
- Greek Cup runner-up: 2015–16
