= Enrique Triverio =

Argentine footballer

Personal information
- Full name: Enrique Luis Triverio
- Date of birth: 31 December 1988 (age 37)
- Place of birth: Aldao, Argentina
- Height: 1.84 m (6 ft 0 in)
- Position: Forward

Team information
- Current team: Always Ready
- Number: 9

Senior career*
Years	Team	Apps	(Gls)
2008–2011	Unión de Sunchales	84	(14)
2011–2012	Gimnasia Jujuy	24	(0)
2012–2013	Juventud Antoniana	33	(10)
2013	Argentinos Juniors	11	(1)
2014	Defensa y Justicia	15	(2)
2014	→ Unión Santa Fe (loan)	20	(8)
2015	Unión Santa Fe	12	(9)
2015–2017	Toluca	56	(22)
2017–2018	Racing Club	17	(1)
2018–2021	Toluca	57	(6)
2019–2020	→ Querétaro (loan)	19	(2)
2021	Huracán	18	(3)
2022–2025	The Strongest	114	(52)
2025–	Always Ready	19	(7)
- * Club domestic league appearances and goals as of 20:37, 12 December 2023 (UTC)

Enrique Luis Triverio (born 31 December 1988) is an Argentine professional footballer who plays as a forward for Bolivian Primera División club Always Ready.

== Career ==
=== Early career ===
Born in Aldao, Santa Fe, Triverio began his career with Unión de Sunchales in the Torneo Federal A. In August 2011, he moved to Primera B Nacional side Gimnasia y Esgrima de Jujuy on a one-year deal. After failing to score any goals for the latter side, he returned to the third division with Juventud Antoniana in 2012.

On 8 July 2013, after scoring 13 times for Antoniana, Triverio joined Primera División side Argentinos Juniors. He made his top tier debut on 2 August, in a 3– loss to Godoy Cruz, and scored his first goal on 2 November by netting the fourth in a 4–0 home routing of Olimpo.

On 23 January 2014, Triverio moved to Defensa y Justicia in the second division. On 28 June, after Defensa's promotion, he was loaned to Unión de Santa Fe.

In February 2015, after helping in Unión's promotion top the top tier with eight goals, the club bought 50% of Triverio's economic rights.

=== Toluca ===
On 26 May 2015, Triverio agreed to a three-year deal with Liga MX team Deportivo Toluca. He made his official debut for the club on 26 July, starting and scoring the opener in a 1–0 win against Tigres UANL at the Universitario Stadium.

On 10 March 2017, Triverio was given an eight-match ban by the Mexico Football Federation for having pushed referee Miguel Ángel Flores in the chest; three days later, the punishment was increased to a one-year ban, after the Liga MX referees' association (AMA) went on strike to force the cancellation of Liga MX and Copa MX Round 10 matches appalling at the initial consequences for Triverio and Pablo Aguilar from Club América, which refs viewed as too light.

=== Racing Club ===
On 8 August 2017, Toluca announced the departure of Triverio to Racing Club, on a four-year contract.

=== Toluca return ===
On 10 July 2018, Triverio returned to Mexico and Toluca, after the club bought 50% of his economic rights. After becoming a backup option, he was loaned to fellow league team Querétaro in July 2019.

Triverio returned to Toluca for the 2020–21 season, but only scored one league goal.

=== Huracán ===
On 24 June 2021, Triverio signed an 18-month deal with Huracán.

=== The Strongest ===
On 9 January 2022, Triverio joined Bolivian Primera División side The Strongest.

== Personal life ==
Triverio's younger brothers Gaspar and Baltazar are also footballers. Twins, both are midfielders.

== Career statistics ==
As of 12 December 2023.

Club statistics
Club	Season	League			Cup		Continental		Other		Total	
Club	Season	Division	Apps	Goals	Apps	Goals	Apps	Goals	Apps	Goals	Apps	Goals
Gimnasia Jujuy	2011–12	Primera B Nacional	24	0	0	0	—		—		24	0
Juventud Antoniana	2012–13	Torneo Argentino A	33	10	4	3	—		—		37	13
Argentinos Juniors	2013–14	Primera División	11	1	0	0	—		—		11	1
Defensa y Justicia	2013–14	Primera B Nacional	15	2	—		—		—		15	2
Unión Santa Fe	2014	Primera B Nacional	20	8	—		—		—		20	8
Unión Santa Fe	2015	Primera División	12	9	1	0	—		—		13	9
Unión Santa Fe	Total		32	17	1	0	—		—		33	17
Toluca	2015–16	Liga MX	33	16	2	2	5 (Note: Appearance(s) in Copa Libertadores)	4	—		40	22
Toluca	2016–17	Liga MX	21	5	10	5	—		—		31	10
Toluca	2017–18	Liga MX	2	0	0	0	—		—		2	0
Toluca	Total		56	21	12	7	5	4	—		73	32
Racing Club	2017–18	Primera División	17	1	2	0	4 (Note: Appearance(s) in Copa Sudamericana)	1	—		23	2
Toluca	2018–19	Liga MX	21	5	1	0	1 (Note: Appearance(s) in CONCACAF Champions Cup)	0	—		23	5
Toluca	2020–21	Liga MX	36	1	0	0	—		—		36	1
Toluca	Total		57	6	1	0	1	0	—		59	6
Querétaro (loan)	2019–20	Liga MX	19	2	6	2	—		—		25	4
Huracán	2021	Primera División	18	3	—		—		—		18	3
The Strongest	2022	Bolivian Primera División	41	14	—		11 (Note: Two appearances in Copa Libertadores, nine appearances and four goals in Copa Sudamericana)	4	—		52	18
The Strongest	2023	Bolivian Primera División	28	22	—		6	4	6 (Note: Appearance(s) in Copa de la División Profesional)	0	40	26
The Strongest	Total		69	36	—		17	8	6	0	92	44
Career total			351	99	26	12	27	13	6	0	410	124
