= List of Mexican football transfers summer 2018 =

This is a list of Mexican football transfers for the 2018 summer transfer window, grouped by club. It only includes football transfers related to clubs from the Liga Bancomer MX, the top flight of Mexican football.

== Liga Bancomer MX ==
=== América ===
In: Note: Flags indicate national team as defined under FIFA eligibility rules; some limited exceptions apply. Players may hold more than one non-FIFA nationality.

No.	Pos.	Nation	Player
3	DF	MEX	Jorge Sánchez (from Santos Laguna)
9	FW	COL	Roger Martínez (from (China) Jiangsu Suning, previously on loan at (Spain) Villarreal)
12	DF	MEX	Luis Reyes (from Atlas)
17	FW	ARG	Cristian Insaurralde (on loan from (Chile) O'Higgins)
95	FW	MEX	Manuel Pérez (loan return from BUAP)

Out: Note: Flags indicate national team as defined under FIFA eligibility rules; some limited exceptions apply. Players may hold more than one non-FIFA nationality.

No.	Pos.	Nation	Player
7	MF	BRA	William da Silva (to Toluca)
16	MF	MEX	Carlos Orrantía (loan return to Santos Laguna)
13	GK	MEX	Luis Pineda (to Tapachula)
17	FW	MEX	Ricardo Marín (on loan to Necaxa)
19	FW	MEX	Alejandro Díaz (on loan to Atlas)
32	DF	MEX	Enrique Cedillo (on loan to Tlaxcala)
284	MF	MEX	Francisco Córdova (on loan to Necaxa)
285	MF	MEX	Aldo Cruz (on loan to BUAP)
—	GK	MEX	Moisés Muñoz (retired, previously on loan at Puebla)
—	DF	MEX	Gil Burón (on loan to Tuxtla, previously on loan at Murciélagos)
—	DF	MEX	Bryan Colula (on loan to Oaxaca, previously on loan at Necaxa)
—	DF	MEX	Osmar Mares (to Veracruz, previously on loan)
—	DF	MEX	Érik Pimentel (to Puebla, previously on loan)
—	MF	MEX	José Guerrero (to Puebla, previously on loan)
—	MF	URU	Brian Lozano (to Santos Laguna, previously on loan)
—	FW	MEX	Lugiani Gallardo (to (South Africa) University of Pretoria, previously on loan at Zacatepec)
—	FW	MEX	Alfonso Sánchez (on loan to Oaxaca, previously on loan at BUAP)
—	FW	MEX	Martín Zúñiga (to Cruz Azul, previously on loan at Oaxaca)

=== Atlas ===
In: Note: Flags indicate national team as defined under FIFA eligibility rules; some limited exceptions apply. Players may hold more than one non-FIFA nationality.

No.	Pos.	Nation	Player
2	DF	ARG	Nicolás Pareja (from (Spain) Sevilla)
8	MF	COL	Andrés Andrade (on loan from León)
11	MF	ARG	Ricky Álvarez (from (Italy) Sampdoria)
14	DF	USA	Omar Gonzalez (on loan from Pachuca)
16	DF	MEX	Heriberto Olvera (on loan from Pachuca, previously on loan at BUAP)
17	FW	COL	Jefferson Duque (loan return from Morelia)
18	FW	MEX	Alejandro Díaz (on loan from América)
19	FW	URU	Octavio Rivero (from (Chile) Colo-Colo)
21	MF	CHI	Lorenzo Reyes (from Universidad de Chile)
23	GK	MEX	Édgar Hernández (on loan from Querétaro, previously on loan at Oaxaca)

Out: Note: Flags indicate national team as defined under FIFA eligibility rules; some limited exceptions apply. Players may hold more than one non-FIFA nationality.

No.	Pos.	Nation	Player
1	GK	ARG	Óscar Ustari (unattached)
2	DF	COL	Jaine Barreiro (to Pachuca)
4	DF	MEX	Rafael Márquez (retired)
12	DF	MEX	Daniel Arreola (loan return to Morelia)
13	DF	MEX	José Monroy (on loan to Durango)
14	DF	MEX	Luis Reyes (to América)
17	FW	ARG	Milton Caraglio (to Cruz Azul)
18	MF	MEX	Luis Robles (on loan to Puebla)
21	MF	MEX	Cándido Ramírez (loan return to Monterrey)
22	FW	CHI	Ángelo Henríquez (to Universidad de Chile)
23	GK	CHI	Cristopher Toselli (loan return to (Chile) Universidad Católica)
24	MF	MEX	Ángel Gaspar (on loan to Zacatepec)
30	GK	MEX	Miguel Fraga (on loan to UNAM)
32	DF	PER	Roberto Villamarín (on loan to (Peru) Alianza Lima)
33	MF	ENG	Ravel Morrison (loan return to (Italy) Lazio)
87	DF	MEX	Diego Barbosa (on loan to Sinaloa)
102	MF	MEX	Carlos Nava (on loan to Tuxtla)
—	GK	MEX	Héctor Lomelí (on loan to Oaxaca, previously on loan at La Piedad)
—	DF	MEX	Diego Cruz (to Puebla, previously on loan)
—	DF	ARG	Facundo Erpen (to (Argentina) San Martín de San Juan, previously on loan at BUAP)
—	DF	MEX	Juan de Dios Hernández (on loan to Zacatepec, previously on loan at Atlante)
—	DF	MEX	Giovanni León (on loan to Atlético San Luis, previously on loan at Murciélagos)
—	DF	MEX	Enrique Pérez (on loan to Veracruz, previously on loan at Tapachula)
—	DF	MEX	Fernando Ruíz (unattached, previously on loan at Puebla)
—	MF	MEX	Ricardo Bocanegra (unattached, previously on loan at Murciélagos)
—	MF	MEX	Daniel Hernández (unattached, previously on loan at Atlante)
—	MF	CHI	Rodrigo Millar (to Morelia, previously on loan)
—	FW	URU	Christian Tabó (to Puebla, previously on loan)
—	MF	MEX	Luis Télles (on loan to UdeG, previously on loan at Juárez)
—	MF	MEX	Carlos Treviño (unattached, previously on loan at BUAP)
—	FW	MEX	Martín Barragán (to Necaxa, previously on loan)
—	FW	MEX	Jahir Barraza (on loan to Venados, previously on loan at Atlético San Luis)
—	FW	MEX	Gerardo Martínez (unattached, previously on loan at Irapuato)
—	FW	MEX	Flavio Santos (on loan to Oaxaca)

=== BUAP ===
In: Note: Flags indicate national team as defined under FIFA eligibility rules; some limited exceptions apply. Players may hold more than one non-FIFA nationality.

No.	Pos.	Nation	Player
1	GK	MEX	Antonio Rodríguez (on loan from Guadalajara)
4	DF	MEX	Joaquín Esquivel (on loan from Pachuca)
6	DF	HON	Félix Crisanto (on loan from (Honduras) Motagua)
8	MF	MEX	Jorge Ibarra (loan return from Sinaloa)
10	MF	ESP	Abraham (on loan from UNAM)
12	DF	MEX	Óscar Rojas (on loan from Puebla)
13	MF	MEX	Omar Tejeda (loan return from (Peru) Melgar)
14	MF	CHI	Bryan Rabello (on loan from Santos Laguna)
16	DF	USA	Michael Orozco (from Tijuana)
18	MF	MEX	Aldo Cruz (on loan from América)
19	FW	MEX	Mauro Laínez (on loan from Pachuca, previously on loan at León)
20	MF	MEX	Jorge Zárate (on loan from Morelia)
21	FW	BRA	Yago César (from (Brazil) Atlético Paranaense)
23	GK	PER	Alejandro Duarte (from (Peru) Universidad San Martín)
26	DF	MEX	Jairo González (on loan from Necaxa)
28	MF	MEX	Francisco Torres (on loan from Santos Laguna, previously on loan at Puebla)
29	FW	ARG	Leonardo Ramos (from Tapachula)
30	FW	TUR	Colin Kazim-Richards (on loan from (Brazil) Corinthians)
33	MF	HON	Michaell Chirinos (on loan from (Honduras) Olimpia)

Out: Note: Flags indicate national team as defined under FIFA eligibility rules; some limited exceptions apply. Players may hold more than one non-FIFA nationality.

No.	Pos.	Nation	Player
1	GK	URU	Lucero Álvarez (to (Colombia) Rionegro Águilas)
4	DF	ARG	Facundo Erpen (loan return to Atlas)
5	DF	MEX	Orlando Rincón (to UAEM)
6	MF	MEX	Carlos Treviño (loan return to Atlas)
7	FW	MEX	Amaury Escoto (loan return to Querétaro)
11	FW	MEX	Alfonso Tamay (loan return to UANL)
12	DF	MEX	Heriberto Olvera (loan return to Pachuca)
14	FW	PER	Irven Ávila (on loan to Morelia)
15	FW	MEX	Luis Márquez (loan return to Guadalajara)
16	FW	MEX	Alfonso Sánchez (loan return to América)
17	DF	PER	Luis Advíncula (loan return to UANL)
18	MF	PER	Pedro Aquino (loan return to Monterrey)
19	FW	MEX	Jerónimo Amione (loan return to Puebla)
20	FW	MEX	Guillermo Clemens (loan return to Celaya)
21	DF	MEX	Eduardo Tercero (to UANL)
22	DF	MEX	Emmanuel Escobar (end of contract)
23	FW	MEX	Manuel Pérez (loan return to América)
25	DF	MEX	Juan García (loan return to Cruz Azul)
26	MF	MEX	Juan Carlos Medina (retired)
28	MF	MEX	Carlos Adrián Morales (loan return to Morelia)
29	GK	MEX	Jorge Villalpando (unattached)
30	FW	COL	Arley Rodríguez (loan return to UANL)
33	FW	COL	Julián Quiñones (loan return to UANL)
34	DF	MEX	Irving Zurita (loan return to Atlante)
90	MF	MEX	José Rodríguez (loan return to Puebla)
108	GK	MEX	Aldo Paredes (loan return to Puebla)
—	DF	MEX	Richard Okunorobo (on loan to Oaxaca, previously on loan at Sinaloa)

=== Cruz Azul ===
In: Note: Flags indicate national team as defined under FIFA eligibility rules; some limited exceptions apply. Players may hold more than one non-FIFA nationality.

No.	Pos.	Nation	Player
2	DF	PAR	Pablo Aguilar (from Tijuana)
5	DF	CHI	Igor Lichnovsky (from Necaxa)
9	FW	ARG	Milton Caraglio (from Atlas)
11	MF	MEX	Elías Hernández (from León)
14	MF	MEX	Misael Domínguez (on loan from Monterrey)
19	MF	MEX	Antonio Sánchez (from UdeG)
20	FW	COL	Andrés Rentería (from Querétaro, previously on loan at (Colombia) Atlético Nacional)
23	MF	ARG	Iván Marcone (from (Argentina) Lanús)
25	MF	MEX	Roberto Alvarado (from Necaxa)
28	FW	MEX	Martín Zúñiga (from América, previously on loan at Oaxaca)

Out: Note: Flags indicate national team as defined under FIFA eligibility rules; some limited exceptions apply. Players may hold more than one non-FIFA nationality.

No.	Pos.	Nation	Player
3	DF	CHI	Enzo Roco (to (Turkey) Beşiktaş)
5	MF	CHI	Francisco Silva (to (Argentina) Independiente)
6	DF	ARG	Julián Velázquez (to Tijuana)
9	FW	CHI	Felipe Mora (on loan to UNAM)
11	FW	MEX	Carlos Fierro (on loan to Morelia)
14	MF	CHI	Martín Rodríguez (on loan to UNAM)
18	MF	MEX	Carlos Peña (loan from (Scotland) Rangers rescinded)
19	MF	MEX	Rosario Cota (on loan to UNAM)
24	FW	MEX	Víctor Zúñiga (on loan to Venados)
—	DF	MEX	Francisco Flores (on loan to Tlaxcala, previously on loan at Atlante)
—	DF	MEX	Jesús García (on loan to Real Zamora, previously on loan at Murciélagos)
—	DF	MEX	Omar Mendoza (to Tijuana, previously on loan)
—	MF	MEX	Diego Franco (to (South Africa) University of Pretoria, previously on loan at (Spain) Salmantino)
—	MF	MEX	Christian Giménez (re-loan to Pachuca)
—	MF	MEX	Jesús Lara (on loan to Atlético Reynosa, previously on loan at Veracruz)
—	MF	ECU	Joao Rojas (to (Brazil) São Paulo, previously on loan at (Argentina) Talleres)

=== Guadalajara ===
In: Note: Flags indicate national team as defined under FIFA eligibility rules; some limited exceptions apply. Players may hold more than one non-FIFA nationality.

No.	Pos.	Nation	Player
1	GK	MEX	Raúl Gudiño (from (Portugal) Porto, previously on loan at (Cyprus) APOEL)
2	DF	MEX	Josecarlos Van Rankin (on loan from UNAM)
15	MF	MEX	Ángel Sepúlveda (from Morelia)
16	DF	MEX	Miguel Ponce (loan return from Necaxa)
29	MF	MEX	Alejandro Zendejas (loan return from Zacatepec)
33	DF	MEX	Mario de Luna (loan return from Necaxa)

Out: Note: Flags indicate national team as defined under FIFA eligibility rules; some limited exceptions apply. Players may hold more than one non-FIFA nationality.

No.	Pos.	Nation	Player
1	GK	MEX	Antonio Rodríguez (on loan to BUAP)
2	DF	MEX	Oswaldo Alanís (to (Spain) Getafe)
15	MF	MEX	Michelle Benítez (on loan to Zacatepec)
20	MF	MEX	Rodolfo Pizarro (to Monterrey)
29	FW	MEX	Ronaldo Cisneros (on loan to Zacatepec)
30	GK	MEX	Rodolfo Cota (loan return to Pachuca)
82	DF	MEX	Luis Solorio (on loan to Zacatepec)
87	DF	MEX	Carlos Zamora (on loan to Zacatepec)
88	DF	MEX	Alejandro Mayorga (on loan to Necaxa)
93	MF	MEX	José Peralta (on loan to Zacatepec)
102	FW	MEX	José Gurrola (on loan to Atlético San Luis)
287	DF	MEX	Óscar Macías (on loan to Zacatepec)
289	FW	MEX	José González (on loan to (Spain) Tudelano)
—	DF	MEX	Carlos Salcedo (to (Germany) Eintracht Frankfurt, previously on loan)
—	DF	MEX	Carlos Villanueva (on loan to Necaxa, previously on loan at Zacatepec)
—	MF	MEX	Jorge Enríquez (to (Cyprus) Omonia, previously on loan at Puebla)
—	MF	MEX	Giovani Hernández (on loan to Necaxa, previously on loan at Zacatepec)
—	MF	MEX	Luis Márquez (on loan to Zacatepec, previously on loan at BUAP)
—	MF	MEX	Édgar Mejía (retired, previously on loan at Murciélagos)
—	MF	MEX	David Toledo (retired, previously on loan at Oaxaca)
—	FW	MEX	William Guzmán (on loan to UAT, previously on loan at Murciélagos)

=== León ===
In: Note: Flags indicate national team as defined under FIFA eligibility rules; some limited exceptions apply. Players may hold more than one non-FIFA nationality.

No.	Pos.	Nation	Player
1	GK	MEX	Guillermo Pozos (from Celaya, previously on loan at Murciélagos)
2	DF	MEX	Miguel Velázquez (on loan from Pachuca, previously on loan at Zacatecas)
6	DF	COL	William Tesillo (from (Colombia) Santa Fe)
7	MF	MEX	Leonel López (loan return from Toluca)
9	FW	PAR	Walter González (on loan from Pachuca)
11	MF	COL	Yairo Moreno (from (Colombia) Independiente Medellín)
16	MF	CHI	Jean Meneses (on loan from (Chile) Universidad de Concepción)
18	MF	PER	Pedro Aquino (from Monterrey, previously on loan at BUAP)
20	MF	MEX	Héctor Mascorro (on loan from Pachuca, previously on loan at Zacatecas)
27	FW	COL	José Calero (on loan from Pachuca)
30	GK	MEX	Rodolfo Cota (on loan from Pachuca, previously on loan at Guadalajara)
34	DF	USA	Edwin Lara (on loan from Pachuca)

Out: Note: Flags indicate national team as defined under FIFA eligibility rules; some limited exceptions apply. Players may hold more than one non-FIFA nationality.

No.	Pos.	Nation	Player
1	GK	MEX	Carlos Rodríguez (on loan to Atlético San Luis)
3	DF	ARG	Guillermo Burdisso (to (Argentina) Independiente)
4	DF	PAR	Iván Piris (loan return to Monterrey)
7	MF	COL	Hernán Burbano (to (Colombia) Santa Fe)
8	FW	MEX	Elías Hernández (to Cruz Azul)
9	FW	CHI	Álvaro Ramos (on loan to (Chile) Everton)
11	MF	COL	Andrés Andrade (on loan to Atlas)
15	MF	ARG	Emanuel Cecchini (loan return to (Spain) Málaga)
19	MF	MEX	Mauro Laínez (loan return to Pachuca)
20	FW	USA	Landon Donovan (unattached)
33	FW	JAM	Giles Barnes (to (United States) Colorado Rapids)
91	DF	MEX	Carlos Alba (to (Malta) Sliema Wanderers)
106	MF	USA	Flavio Pérez (to (Malta) Sliema Wanderers)
—	DF	ARG	Diego Novaretti (to Querétaro, previously on loan)
—	DF	MEX	Iván Pineda (on loan to Zacatecas, previously on loan at UAT)
—	DF	MEX	Samuel Sánchez (on loan to Atlético Reynosa, previously on loan at Murciélagos)
—	MF	MEX	Mauricio Castañeda (to (Costa Rica) Puerto Golfito, previously on loan at Murciélagos)
—	MF	MEX	Diego de la Tejera (unattached, previously on loan at Celaya)
—	FW	MEX	Aldo Magaña (on loan to (Costa Rica) Herediano, previously on loan at Celaya)

=== Monterrey ===
In: Note: Flags indicate national team as defined under FIFA eligibility rules; some limited exceptions apply. Players may hold more than one non-FIFA nationality.

No.	Pos.	Nation	Player
1	GK	ARG	Marcelo Barovero (on loan from Necaxa)
6	DF	MEX	Edson Gutiérrez (from Celaya)
17	MF	MEX	Jesús Gallardo (from UNAM)
19	MF	MEX	Luis Madrigal (loan return from Oaxaca)
20	MF	MEX	Rodolfo Pizarro (from Guadalajara)
23	DF	MEX	Johan Vásquez (on loan from Sonora)
29	MF	MEX	Carlos Rodríguez (loan return from (Spain) Toledo)
305	DF	MEX	Paolo Medina (from (Portugal) Benfica)

Out: Note: Flags indicate national team as defined under FIFA eligibility rules; some limited exceptions apply. Players may hold more than one non-FIFA nationality.

No.	Pos.	Nation	Player
1	GK	MEX	Hugo González (on loan to Necaxa)
9	FW	ARG	Lucas Albertengo (loan return to (Argentina) Independiente)
13	MF	URU	Carlos Sánchez (to (Brazil) Santos)
17	MF	MEX	Jesús Zavala (to Zacatecas)
20	DF	MEX	Juan Álvarez (unattached)
23	DF	MEX	Juan Portales (on loan to Atlético San Luis)
27	FW	PAR	Jorge Benítez (to (Paraguay) Cerro Porteño)
30	FW	MEX	Julio Cruz (to (Costa Rica) Guadalupe)
32	DF	MEX	Efraín Velarde (on loan to Morelia)
82	DF	MEX	Germán Camacho (on loan to (Spain) Toledo)
287	MF	MEX	William Mejía (on loan to (Spain) Toledo)
295	MF	MEX	Misael Domínguez (on loan to Cruz Azul)
—	GK	MEX	Luis Cárdenas (on loan to Querétaro, previously on loan at Zacatepec)
—	GK	ECU	Alexander Domínguez (to (Argentina) Vélez Sarsfield, previously on loan at (Argentina) Colón)
—	DF	MEX	Alejandro Berber (on loan to Venados, previously on loan at Juárez)
—	DF	MEX	Alejandro García (unattached, previously on loan at Juárez)
—	DF	PAR	Iván Piris (to (Argentina) Newell's Old Boys, previously on loan at León)
—	MF	MEX	Gael Acosta (on loan to Querétaro, previously on loan at Oaxaca)
—	MF	MEX	André Aguilar (on loan to Atlético Reynosa, previously on loan at Murciélagos)
—	MF	PER	Pedro Aquino (to León, previously on loan at BUAP)
—	MF	MEX	Ían Arellano (on loan to Venados, previously on loan at Juárez)
—	FW	MEX	Omar Arellano (on loan to (Costa Rica) Herediano, previously on loan at (Spain) Ontinyent)
—	FW	MEX	Ángel López (on loan to Oaxaca, previously on loan at Veracruz)

=== Morelia ===
In: Note: Flags indicate national team as defined under FIFA eligibility rules; some limited exceptions apply. Players may hold more than one non-FIFA nationality.

No.	Pos.	Nation	Player
2	DF	MEX	Efraín Velarde (from Monterrey)
7	FW	MEX	Carlos Fierro (on loan from Cruz Azul)
11	FW	PER	Irven Ávila (on loan from BUAP)
14	MF	PER	Edison Flores (from (Denmark) AaB)
20	MF	CHI	Rodrigo Millar (from Atlas, previously on loan)
21	FW	PAR	Sebastián Ferreira (from (Paraguay) Olimpia, previously on loan at (Paraguay) Independiente de Campo Grande)
32	DF	MEX	Ignacio González (loan return from Sinaloa)

Out: Note: Flags indicate national team as defined under FIFA eligibility rules; some limited exceptions apply. Players may hold more than one non-FIFA nationality.

No.	Pos.	Nation	Player
3	DF	MEX	Carlos Rodríguez (loan return to Toluca)
7	MF	MEX	Diego Mejía (loan return to Sinaloa)
8	MF	MEX	Juan Pablo Rodríguez (loan return to Santos Laguna)
9	FW	PER	Raúl Ruidíaz (to (United States) Seattle Sounders FC)
11	FW	MEX	Jorge Zárate (on loan to BUAP)
14	FW	COL	Jefferson Duque (loan return to Atlas)
15	MF	MEX	Ángel Sepúlveda (to Guadalajara)
16	DF	MEX	Eduardo Chávez (unattached)
21	GK	MEX	Jesús Urbina (loan return to UANL)
29	FW	MEX	Fernando Ortiz (on loan to Sonora)
95	DF	MEX	Diego Rangel (on loan to (Peru) Sport Boys)
101	MF	USA	Ernest Nungaray (on loan to (Peru) Sport Boys)
—	DF	MEX	Daniel Arreola (on loan to Puebla, previously on loan at Atlas)
—	MF	MEX	David Franco (to (Argentina) Almirante Brown, previously on loan at UNAM)
—	MF	MEX	Víctor Guajardo (on loan to Venados, previously on loan at Sonora)
—	MF	MEX	Carlos Adrián Morales (retired, previously on loan at BUAP)
—	MF	MEX	Hibert Ruíz (on loan to Veracruz, previously on loan at UdeG)

=== Necaxa ===
In: Note: Flags indicate national team as defined under FIFA eligibility rules; some limited exceptions apply. Players may hold more than one non-FIFA nationality.

No.	Pos.	Nation	Player
1	GK	MEX	Hugo González (on loan from Monterrey)
3	DF	MEX	Luis Donaldo Hernández (loan return from Tapachula)
4	DF	MEX	Carlos Villanueva (on loan from Guadalajara, previously on loan at Zacatepec)
5	DF	MEX	Alejandro Mayorga (on loan from Guadalajara)
8	MF	URU	Facundo Castro (from (Uruguay) Defensor Sporting)
9	FW	MEX	Martín Barragán (from Atlas, previously on loan)
11	FW	ARG	Brian Fernández (from (Argentina) Racing, previously on loan at (Chile) Unión La Calera)
15	FW	CHI	Pedro Campos (from (Chile) Universidad Católica)
17	MF	MEX	Ricardo Marín (on loan from América)
22	MF	MEX	Francisco Córdova (on loan from América)
23	DF	MEX	Leobardo López (on loan from Veracruz, previously on loan at Celaya)
27	MF	MEX	Carlos Peña (on loan from (Scotland) Rangers, previously on loan at Cruz Azul)
28	MF	MEX	Giovani Hernández (on loan from Guadalajara, previously on loan at Zacatepec)
30	DF	MEX	José Medina (from Oaxaca)
33	MF	CHI	Bryan Carvallo (from (Chile) Colo-Colo)
289	MF	MEX	José Cobián (loan return from Atlante)
302	DF	MEX	Érik Lira (on loan from UNAM)
347	FW	MEX	Ricardo Monreal (on loan from Oaxaca)

Out: Note: Flags indicate national team as defined under FIFA eligibility rules; some limited exceptions apply. Players may hold more than one non-FIFA nationality.

No.	Pos.	Nation	Player
1	GK	ARG	Marcelo Barovero (on loan to Monterrey)
4	DF	MEX	Luis Omar Hernández (to (Guatemala) Chiantla)
5	DF	CHI	Igor Lichnovsky (to Cruz Azul)
8	MF	MEX	Xavier Báez (unattached)
12	DF	MEX	Diego Hernández (on loan to Oaxaca)
13	MF	MEX	Roberto Alvarado (to Cruz Azul)
17	DF	MEX	Miguel Ponce (loan return to Guadalajara)
20	DF	MEX	Bryan Colula (loan return to América)
21	GK	MEX	Aarón Fernández (loan return to UANL)
26	DF	MEX	Jairo González (on loan to BUAP)
28	MF	CRC	Gerson Torres (loan return to (Costa Rica) Herediano)
32	FW	PAR	Carlos González (to UNAM)
33	DF	MEX	Mario de Luna (loan return to Guadalajara)
34	MF	COL	Gustavo Culma (to UAT)
35	FW	ECU	Bryan de Jesús (to (Ecuador) El Nacional)
113	MF	MEX	Diego Cornejo (to (Spain) Alcorcón)
284	MF	MEX	Jorge Cornejo (to (Spain) Alcorcón)
—	MF	MEX	Carlos Hurtado (unattached, on loan at Celaya)
—	DF	MEX	Luis Padilla (on loan to Oaxaca, previously on loan at Celaya)
—	DF	MEX	Carlos Ramos (on loan to Celaya, previously on loan at Atlético San Luis)
—	DF	MEX	Mario Valdéz (unattached, previously on loan at Murciélagos)
—	MF	MEX	Sergio Bueno (unattached, previously on loan at Atlante)
—	MF	MEX	Michel García (on loan to Oaxaca, previously on loan at Tampico Madero)
—	FW	MEX	Kevin Chaurand (on loan to Zacatepec, previously on loan at Murciélagos)

=== Pachuca ===
In: Note: Flags indicate national team as defined under FIFA eligibility rules; some limited exceptions apply. Players may hold more than one non-FIFA nationality.

No.	Pos.	Nation	Player
2	DF	COL	Jaine Barreiro (from Atlas)
3	DF	BRA	Elbis (from Zacatepec)
4	DF	MEX	Miguel Tapias (loan return from Zacatecas)
8	MF	COL	Sebastián Pérez (on loan from (Argentina) Boca Juniors)
9	FW	COL	Juan Pérez (from Veracruz, previously on loan at Celaya)
10	MF	MEX	Christian Giménez (re-loan from Cruz Azul)
11	FW	ARG	Leonardo Ulloa (from (England) Leicester City, previously on loan at (England) Brighton & Hove Albion)
311	FW	MEX	Josué Gómez (loan return from Juárez)

Out: Note: Flags indicate national team as defined under FIFA eligibility rules; some limited exceptions apply. Players may hold more than one non-FIFA nationality.

No.	Pos.	Nation	Player
2	MF	JPN	Keisuke Honda (to (Australia) Melbourne Victory)
3	DF	MEX	José Esquivel (on loan to BUAP)
4	DF	USA	Omar Gonzalez (on loan to Atlas)
9	FW	PAR	Walter González (on loan to León)
11	MF	GAM	Kekuta Manneh (to (Switzerland) St. Gallen)
15	MF	MEX	Érick Gutiérrez (to (Netherlands) PSV)
27	FW	COL	Juan José Calero (on loan to León)
30	DF	MEX	José Villegas (on loan to Tlaxcala)
31	FW	MEX	Édgar Ayala (on loan to Tlaxcala)
32	DF	COL	Dairon Mosquera (to (Paraguay) Olimpia)
33	FW	CRC	Andy Reyes (to (Austria) LASK)
35	DF	MEX	Salomón Wbias (unattached)
97	FW	MEX	Brayam Rochin (on loan to Zacatecas)
198	MF	MEX	Omar Soto (on loan to Zacatecas)
281	GK	MEX	Ángel Rascón (on loan to Zacatecas)
282	DF	MEX	Fernando Ramírez (on loan to Zacatecas)
284	DF	MEX	Ernesto Monreal (on loan to Zacatecas)
285	DF	MEX	Edwin Lara (on loan to León)
311	FW	MEX	Luis González (on loan to Zacatecas)
331	GK	MEX	Carlos Moreno (on loan to (Chile) Everton)
—	GK	MEX	Rodolfo Cota (on loan to León, previously on loan at Guadalajara)
—	GK	MEX	Alain Estrada (on loan to Tlaxcala, previously on loan at Murciélagos)
—	DF	USA	Kevin Huezo (to (United States) Golden State Force, previously on loan at Murciélagos)
—	DF	MEX	Heriberto Olvera (on loan to Atlas, previously on loan at BUAP)
—	DF	MEX	Óscar Torres (on loan to Zacatecas, previously on loan at Tlaxcala)
—	DF	MEX	Abraham Torres Nilo (on loan to Zacatepec, previously on loan at Zacatecas)
—	DF	MEX	Miguel Velázquez (on loan to León, previously on loan at Zacatecas)
—	MF	MEX	Fernando Cortés (unattached, previously on loan at Oaxaca)
—	MF	MEX	Rodolfo Galindo (unattached, previously on loan at Murciélagos)
—	MF	MEX	Mauro Laínez (on loan to BUAP, previously on loan to León)
—	MF	MEX	Héctor Mascorro (on loan to León, previously on loan to Zacatecas)
—	MF	COL	Jhon Pajoy (to (Saudi Arabia) Al-Hazem, previously on loan at Santa Fe)
—	MF	MEX	David Ramírez (on loan to Zacatecas, previously on loan at UAT)

=== Puebla ===
In: Note: Flags indicate national team as defined under FIFA eligibility rules; some limited exceptions apply. Players may hold more than one non-FIFA nationality.

No.	Pos.	Nation	Player
5	DF	MEX	Daniel Arreola (on loan from Morelia, previously on loan at Atlas)
9	FW	CAN	Lucas Cavallini (from (Uruguay) Peñarol, previously on loan)
10	MF	MEX	Jonathan Espericueta (on loan from UANL, previously on loan at Atlético San Luis)
11	FW	URU	Christian Tabó (from Atlas, previously on loan)
12	FW	COL	Félix Micolta (loan return from (Colombia) América de Cali)
14	DF	MEX	Érik Pimentel (from América, previously on loan)
15	DF	MEX	Diego Cruz (from Atlas, previously on loan)
17	DF	MEX	Alonso Zamora (from UANL, previously on loan)
18	MF	MEX	Luis Robles (on loan from Atlas)
21	MF	MEX	José Guerrero (from América, previously on loan)
23	MF	USA	José Francisco Torres (on loan from UANL)
26	DF	URU	Ignacio Pallas (from (Paraguay) Cerro Porteño)
31	FW	URU	Cristian Palacios (from (Uruguay) Peñarol)

Out: Note: Flags indicate national team as defined under FIFA eligibility rules; some limited exceptions apply. Players may hold more than one non-FIFA nationality.

No.	Pos.	Nation	Player
3	DF	MEX	Carlos Gutiérrez (on loan to Oaxaca)
4	DF	MEX	Luis Venegas (on loan to Oaxaca)
5	DF	MEX	Patricio Araujo (unattached)
7	MF	MEX	Alonso Escoboza (loan return to Tijuana)
12	DF	MEX	Óscar Rojas (on loan to BUAP)
13	MF	COL	Christian Marrugo (on loan to (Colombia) Millonarios)
16	DF	BRA	Matheus Ribeiro (loan return to (Brazil) Santos)
18	FW	MEX	Darío Carreño (to (Guatemala) Comunicaciones)
19	FW	MEX	Fernando Ruíz (loan return to Atlas)
23	GK	MEX	Moisés Muñoz (loan return to América)
25	MF	MEX	Jorge Enríquez (loan return to Guadalajara)
28	MF	MEX	Francisco Torres (loan return to Santos Laguna)
31	DF	COL	Steven Mondragón (to (Colombia) Itagüí Leones)
—	GK	MEX	Aldo Paredes (on loan to Tabasco, previously on loan at BUAP)
—	DF	MEX	Alfredo Juraidini (to (Lebanon) Salam Zgharta, previously on loan at UAEM)
—	MF	MEX	Luis Ángel Mendoza (on loan to Toluca, previously on loan at Tijuana)
—	MF	MEX	Julio Nava (to Sinaloa, previously on loan)
—	MF	MEX	José Rodríguez (on loan to Tabasco, previously on loan at BUAP)
—	MF	MEX	Ignacio Torres (to Celaya, previously on loan)
—	FW	MEX	Jerónimo Amione (on loan to Oaxaca, previously on loan at BUAP)
—	FW	MEX	Adrián Marín (to Tapachula, previously on loan at (Costa Rica) Herediano)
—	FW	MEX	Eduardo Pérez (on loan to Tampico Madero, previously on loan at Tapachula)

=== Querétaro ===
In: Note: Flags indicate national team as defined under FIFA eligibility rules; some limited exceptions apply. Players may hold more than one non-FIFA nationality.

No.	Pos.	Nation	Player
4	DF	ARG	Diego Novaretti (from León, previously on loan)
11	FW	ARG	Daniel Villalva (on loan from Veracruz)
12	DF	MEX	Areli Hernández (loan return from Sonora)
14	MF	MEX	Gael Acosta (on loan from Monterrey, previously on loan at Oaxaca)
18	MF	BRA	Augusto (from (Iran) Sanat Naft Abadan)
19	MF	USA	Jonathan Suárez (loan return from Sonora)
21	MF	MEX	Francisco Uscanga (from Atlante)
22	GK	MEX	Luis Cárdenas (on loan from Monterrey, previously on loan at Zacatepec)
298	GK	USA	Benny Díaz (loan return from Sonora)

Out: Note: Flags indicate national team as defined under FIFA eligibility rules; some limited exceptions apply. Players may hold more than one non-FIFA nationality.

No.	Pos.	Nation	Player
3	DF	ARG	Miguel Martínez (to (Argentina) Belgrano)
11	MF	PER	Joel Sánchez (loan return to UANL)
12	DF	USA	Jonathan Bornstein (to (Israel) Maccabi Netanya)
14	MF	MEX	Luis Miguel Noriega (to Veracruz)
18	MF	MEX	Ricardo Esqueda (retired)
19	MF	COL	Yerson Candelo (to (Colombia) Atlético Nacional)
20	GK	MEX	Ricardo Díaz (Mexican footballer) (on loan to Sonora)
23	FW	PAR	Édgar Benítez (to (Paraguay) Libertad)
24	MF	MEX	Armando Zamorano (on loan to Sonora)
35	MF	USA	Luis Gil (on loan to (United States) Houston Dynamo)
95	FW	MEX	Obayram Reyes (on loan to Sonora)
99	FW	MEX	Ronaldo Herrera (on loan to Sonora)
285	DF	MEX	Diego Guzmán (on loan to Sonora)
304	FW	MEX	Jonathan Martínez (on loan to Sonora)
308	DF	MEX	Adrián Caballero (on loan to Tapachula)
406	FW	MEX	Teun Wilke (to (Netherlands) Heerenveen)
—	GK	MEX	Joel Gutiérrez (unattached, previously on loan at Sonora)
—	GK	MEX	Édgar Hernández (on loan to Atlas, previously on loan at Oaxaca)
—	DF	MEX	Jorge Echavarría (on loan to UAEM, previously on loan at Zacatepec)
—	MF	MEX	Kevin Gutiérrez (on loan to Juárez, previously on loan at Sinaloa)
—	MF	MEX	Juan Carlos López (unattached, previously on loan at Oaxaca)
—	MF	MEX	Alan Zamora (unattached, previously on loan at Atlante)
—	FW	MEX	Amaury Escoto (on loan to Toluca, previously on loan at BUAP)
—	FW	MEX	Mathews Gómes Da Silva (on loan to Yalmakán, previously on loan at Sonora)
—	FW	MEX	Luis Loroña (on loan to Sonora, previously on loan at UAT)
—	FW	MEX	Brian Martínez (on loan to Real Zamora, previously on loan at Sonora)
—	FW	COL	Andrés Rentería (to Cruz Azul, previously on loan at (Colombia) Atlético Nacional)
—	FW	ARG	Emanuel Villa (retired, previously on loan at Celaya)

=== Santos Laguna ===
In: Note: Flags indicate national team as defined under FIFA eligibility rules; some limited exceptions apply. Players may hold more than one non-FIFA nationality.

No.	Pos.	Nation	Player
5	DF	ARG	Hugo Nervo (from (Argentina) Huracán)
8	MF	MEX	Carlos Orrantía (loan return from América)
11	FW	MEX	Eduardo Herrera (on loan from (Scotland) Rangers)
15	MF	URU	Brian Lozano (from América, previously on loan)
18	FW	ECU	Ayrton Preciado (from (Ecuador) Emelec)
20	MF	MEX	Alejandro Castro (on loan from UNAM, previously on loan at Atlético San Luis)
21	DF	BRA	Dória (from (France) Marseille, previously on loan at (Turkey) Yeni Malatyaspor)
22	MF	COL	Deinner Quiñones (on loan from (Colombia) Independiente Medellín)

Out: Note: Flags indicate national team as defined under FIFA eligibility rules; some limited exceptions apply. Players may hold more than one non-FIFA nationality.

No.	Pos.	Nation	Player
4	DF	MEX	Jorge Sánchez (to América)
5	DF	MEX	Óscar Bernal (on loan to (Colombia) La Equidad)
11	MF	MEX	Ulises Dávila (unattached)
14	DF	MEX	Néstor Araujo (to (Spain) Celta)
18	MF	MEX	David Andrade (to Tampico Madero)
19	DF	USA	Jorge Villafaña (to (United States) Portland Timbers)
20	MF	CHI	Bryan Rabello (on loan to BUAP)
21	FW	CPV	Djaniny (to (Saudi Arabia) Al-Ahli)
24	DF	ARG	Carlos Izquierdoz (to (Argentina) Boca Juniors)
95	DF	MEX	Miguel García (on loan to Tecos)
288	MF	MEX	Jesús Miranda (on loan to Tampico Madero)
291	MF	MEX	Gerardo Rodríguez (on loan to Tampico Madero)
301	MF	COL	Santiago Martínez (on loan to Tampico Madero)
—	DF	MEX	Uriel Álvarez (unattached, previously on loan at Atlante)
—	DF	COL	Juan Caicedo (unattached, previously on loan at Tampico Madero)
—	DF	MEX	Luis Lozoya (on loan to Celaya, previously on loan at Irapuato)
—	DF	MEX	Christian Ramírez (on loan to Inter Playa del Carmen, previously on loan at Real Zamora)
—	MF	MEX	Sergio Ceballos (on loan to UAEM, previously on loan at Tampico Madero)
—	MF	MEX	Edson Morúa (unattached, previously on loan at Murciélagos)
—	MF	MEX	Javier Que (on loan to UdeC, previously on loan at Tuxtla)
—	MF	MEX	Herbert Robinson (on loan to Tlaxcala, previously on loan at Tampico Madero)
—	MF	MEX	Juan Pablo Rodríguez (retired, previously on loan at Morelia)
—	MF	MEX	Julio Salas (on loan to Pacific, previously on loan at Irapuato)
—	MF	MEX	Jaime Toledo (unattached, previously on loan at Juárez)
—	MF	MEX	Francisco Torres (on loan to BUAP, previously on loan at Puebla)
—	FW	HON	Júnior Lacayo (to (Honduras) Olimpia, previously on loan at (Honduras) Marathón)
—	FW	MEX	Joao Maleck (on loan to (Spain) Sevilla Atlético, previously on loan at (Portugal) Porto B)

=== Tijuana ===
In: Note: Flags indicate national team as defined under FIFA eligibility rules; some limited exceptions apply. Players may hold more than one non-FIFA nationality.

No.	Pos.	Nation	Player
2	DF	ARG	Julián Velázquez (from Cruz Azul)
3	DF	MEX	Luis Fuentes (from UNAM)
7	MF	ARG	Diego González (on loan from (Argentina) Racing)
10	FW	COL	Fabián Castillo (from (Turkey) Trabzonspor)
11	FW	ECU	Erick Castillo (from (Ecuador) Barcelona)
15	MF	URU	Diego Rodríguez (from (Argentina) Independiente)
19	FW	MEX	Erick Torres (from UNAM)
20	MF	MEX	Jesús Angulo (from Sinaloa)
21	DF	ARG	Gustavo Canto (from (Argentina) Ferro)
23	MF	ECU	Miller Bolaños (from (Brazil) Grêmio, previously on loan)
28	DF	MEX	Omar Mendoza (from Cruz Azul, previously on loan)

Out: Note: Flags indicate national team as defined under FIFA eligibility rules; some limited exceptions apply. Players may hold more than one non-FIFA nationality.

No.	Pos.	Nation	Player
3	DF	MEX	Yasser Corona (retired)
5	MF	ARG	Damián Musto (on loan to (Spain) Huesca)
7	FW	ARG	Gustavo Bou (on loan to (Argentina) Racing)
10	FW	ARG	Víctor Malcorra (to UNAM)
12	DF	PAR	Pablo Aguilar (to Cruz Azul)
15	MF	ARG	Damián Pérez (to (Chile) Colo-Colo)
16	DF	USA	Michael Orozco (on loan to BUAP)
17	MF	BRA	Mateus Gonçalves (loan return to Zacatepec)
18	FW	PAR	Juan Iturbe (to UNAM)
20	MF	ECU	Julio Angulo (loan return to (Argentina) Huracán)
26	MF	MEX	Luis Ángel Mendoza (loan return to Puebla)
33	MF	USA	Fernando Arce (on loan to Sinaloa)
34	FW	MEX	Alberto García (on loan to Sinaloa)
89	FW	MEX	Vladimir Moragrega (on loan to Oaxaca)
97	FW	COL	Juan Galindrez (on loan to Sinaloa)
98	FW	USA	Jonathan Esparza (on loan to Oaxaca)
—	GK	USA	Carlos López (unattached, previously on loan at Sinaloa)
—	GK	MEX	Sergio Vega (unattached, previously on loan at Celaya)
—	DF	URU	Matías Aguirregaray (on loan to (Saudi Arabia) Al-Fateh, previously on loan at (Spain) Las Palmas)
—	DF	MEX	Jesús Chávez (to Sinaloa, previously on loan)
—	DF	MEX	Oliver Ortiz (to Tapachula, previously on loan at Sinaloa)
—	MF	MEX	Ramón Ceja (on loan to Juárez, previously on loan at Sinaloa)
—	MF	MEX	Adolfo Domínguez (on loan to Toluca, previously on loan at Tapachula)
—	MF	MEX	Alonso Escoboza (on loan to Sinaloa, previously on loan at Puebla)
—	FW	MEX	Raúl Enríquez (unattached, previously on loan at Juárez)
—	FW	ARG	Gabriel Hauche (to (Colombia) Millonarios, previously on loan at Toluca)
—	FW	ARG	Alfredo Moreno (unattached, previously on loan at Celaya)
—	FW	COL	Dayro Moreno (to (Colombia) Atlético Nacional, previously on loan)

=== Toluca ===
In: Note: Flags indicate national team as defined under FIFA eligibility rules; some limited exceptions apply. Players may hold more than one non-FIFA nationality.

No.	Pos.	Nation	Player
2	DF	ARG	Fernando Tobio (from (Brazil) Palmeiras, previously on loan at (Argentina) Rosario Central)
7	MF	MEX	Luis Ángel Mendoza (on loan from Puebla, previously on loan at Tijuana)
8	MF	BRA	William da Silva (from América)
11	FW	MEX	Amaury Escoto (on loan from Querétaro, previously on loan at BUAP)
13	DF	MEX	Héctor Acosta (loan return from Atlético San Luis)
16	MF	MEX	Adolfo Domínguez (on loan from Tijuana, previously on loan at Tapachula)
17	MF	MEX	Richard Ruíz (from Veracruz)
20	FW	URU	Javier Cabrera (from (Argentina) Argentinos Juniors)
21	FW	ARG	Enrique Triverio (from (Argentina) Racing)

Out: Note: Flags indicate national team as defined under FIFA eligibility rules; some limited exceptions apply. Players may hold more than one non-FIFA nationality.

No.	Pos.	Nation	Player
4	DF	URU	Maximiliano Perg (unattached)
6	DF	MEX	Óscar Rojas (unattached)
7	FW	ARG	Gabriel Hauche (loan return to Tijuana)
10	MF	MEX	Ángel Reyna (loan return to Celaya)
13	DF	MEX	Aldo Benítez (to (Spain) Unión Adarve, previously on loan at Real Zamora)
16	GK	MEX	Miguel Centeno (unattached)
17	MF	MEX	Leonel López (loan return to León)
20	FW	COL	Fernando Uribe (to (Brazil) Flamengo)
27	DF	CHI	Fabián Monilla (to (Chile) Malleco Unido)
28	DF	MEX	Jorge Sartiaguin (on loan to Atlante)
31	FW	MEX	Martín Abundis (on loan to Celaya)
32	MF	MEX	Iván Zamora (on loan to Atlante)
34	DF	USA	Andy García (on loan to Real Zamora)
87	MF	MEX	Michel Navarro (on loan to Real Zamora)
—	DF	MEX	Francisco Gamboa (unattached, previously on loan at Atlante)
—	DF	MEX	Christian Pérez (on loan to Juárez, previously on loan at Tapachula)
—	DF	MEX	Mario Quezada (to Zacatepec, previously on loan at Murciélagos)
—	DF	MEX	Carlos Rodríguez (unattached, previously on loan at Morelia)
—	DF	MEX	Emilio Yamín (to (Lebanon) Salam Zgharta, previously on loan at UAEM)
—	MF	MEX	Diego Aguilar (on loan to Zacatecas, previously on loan at Atlante)
—	MF	ARG	Darío Bottinelli (to (Chile) Audax Italiano, previously on loan at (Colombia) América de Cali)
—	FW	MEX	Edy Brambila (on loan to Juárez, previously on loan at Tapachula)
—	FW	MEX	Diego Gama (on loan to Real Zamora, previously on loan at UAEM)
—	FW	MEX	Daniel González (unattached, previously on loan at UAEM)
—	FW	MEX	Raúl Nava (to (Guatemala) Iztapa, previously on loan at Atlante)
—	FW	ENG	Antonio Pedroza (to (Costa Rica) Herediano)

=== UANL ===
In: Note: Flags indicate national team as defined under FIFA eligibility rules; some limited exceptions apply. Players may hold more than one non-FIFA nationality.

No.	Pos.	Nation	Player
11	FW	PER	Beto da Silva (from (Brazil) Grêmio, previously on loan at (Argentina) Argentinos Juniors)
19	MF	ARG	Guido Pizarro (from (Spain) Sevilla)
33	FW	COL	Julián Quiñones (loan return from BUAP)
36	DF	MEX	Eduardo Tercero (from BUAP)

Out: Note: Flags indicate national team as defined under FIFA eligibility rules; some limited exceptions apply. Players may hold more than one non-FIFA nationality.

No.	Pos.	Nation	Player
15	DF	FRA	Timothée Kolodziejczak (on loan to (France) Saint-Étienne)
14	DF	MEX	Jorge Iván Estrada (unattached)
18	MF	USA	José Francisco Torres (on loan to Puebla)
19	MF	COL	Larry Vásquez (on loan to (Colombia) América de Cali)
31	MF	MEX	Luis Martínez (on loan to UAT)
32	MF	MEX	Julio Ibarra (on loan to Tuxtla)
33	FW	MEX	Miguel Quintanilla (unattached)
91	MF	MEX	Jesús Delgado (on loan to Juárez)
92	DF	MEX	Alejandro Garza (on loan to UAT)
98	FW	MEX	Jhonatan Aranda (on loan to Juárez)
284	DF	MEX	Dan Pequeño (on loan to UAT)
302	MF	COL	Arlex Hurtado (on loan to Celaya)
—	DF	PER	Luis Advíncula (on loan to (Spain) Rayo Vallecano, previously on loan at BUAP)
—	DF	ECU	Luis Caicedo (from (Brazil) Cruzeiro, previously on loan at (Ecuador) Barcelona; loaned to Veracruz)
—	DF	MEX	Ricardo Chávez (on loan to Juárez, previously on loan at Sonora)
—	DF	USA	Victor Garza (re-loan to (United States) Rio Grande Valley Toros)
—	DF	ESA	Alexander Larín (on loan to (Guatemala) Comunicaciones, previously on loan at (El Salvador) Alianza)
—	DF	MEX	Alonso Zamora (to Puebla, previously on loan)
—	MF	COL	Johan Arango (to (Saudi Arabia) Al-Batin, previously on loan at Juárez)
—	MF	MEX	Jonathan Espericueta (on loan to Puebla, previously on loan at Atlético San Luis)
—	MF	MEX	Uvaldo Luna (unattached, previously on loan at (Colombia) Once Caldas)
—	MF	COL	William Palacio (on loan to Celaya, previously on loan at (Paraguay) Sol de América)
—	MF	COL	Carlos Rentería (re-loan to (Colombia) Tolima)
—	MF	PER	Joel Sánchez (on loan to (Peru) Melgar, previously on loan at Querétaro)
—	MF	BRA	Alan Santos (on loan to (United Arab Emirates) Al-Ittihad, previously on loan at Veracruz)
—	MF	MEX	Emmanuel Segura (on loan to Sonora, previously on loan at Sinaloa)
—	MF	MEX	Alfonso Tamay (on loan to Tapachula, previously on loan at BUAP)
—	MF	MEX	Hilario Tristán (to (Guatemala) Sonsonate, previously on loan at Sonora)
—	MF	MEX	Manuel Viniegra (on loan to Juárez, previously on loan at Veracruz)
—	FW	MEX	Gerardo Escobedo (on loan to UACH, previously on loan at Atlético San Luis)
—	FW	COL	Carlos Ibargüen (on loan to UAT, previously on loan at Juárez)
—	FW	BRA	Richard Luca (from (Brazil) Santos, loaned to UAT)
—	FW	COL	Carlos Rivas (unattached, previously on loan at UAT)
—	FW	COL	Arley Rodríguez (on loan to (Colombia) Santa Fe, previously on loan at BUAP)

=== UNAM ===
In: Note: Flags indicate national team as defined under FIFA eligibility rules; some limited exceptions apply. Players may hold more than one non-FIFA nationality.

No.	Pos.	Nation	Player
9	FW	CHI	Felipe Mora (on loan from Cruz Azul)
10	MF	ARG	Víctor Malcorra (from Tijuana)
15	FW	PAR	Juan Iturbe (from Tijuana)
16	MF	MEX	Andrés Iniestra (loan return from Venados)
17	MF	CHI	Martín Rodríguez (on loan from Cruz Azul)
25	MF	MEX	Rosario Cota (on loan from Cruz Azul)
29	GK	MEX	Miguel Fraga (on loan from Atlas)
32	FW	PAR	Carlos González (from Necaxa)
98	FW	MEX	Omar Islas (loan return from Venados)
300	MF	MEX	Gustavo Rodríguez (loan return from Atlético San Luis)

Out: Note: Flags indicate national team as defined under FIFA eligibility rules; some limited exceptions apply. Players may hold more than one non-FIFA nationality.

No.	Pos.	Nation	Player
2	DF	MEX	Josecarlos Van Rankin (on loan to Guadalajara)
9	FW	ECU	Joffre Guerrón (to (Ecuador) Barcelona)
10	MF	ESP	Abraham (on loan to BUAP)
13	MF	MEX	Ricardo Jurado (on loan to Inter Playa del Carmen)
15	MF	MEX	Alejandro Zamudio (unattached)
16	DF	MEX	Luis Fuentes (to Tijuana)
17	MF	MEX	Jesús Gallardo (to Monterrey)
18	DF	MEX	José Antonio García (unattached)
20	FW	COL	Yuber Asprilla (loan return to (Colombia) Alianza Petrolera)
23	MF	CHI	Marcelo Díaz (to (Argentina) Racing)
29	MF	MEX	Néstor Calderón (on loan to Celaya)
30	FW	CHI	Nicolas Castillo (to (Portugal) Benfica)
31	FW	MEX	Érick Torres (to Tijuana)
33	MF	ARG	Mauro Formica (to (Argentina) Newell's Old Boys)
84	DF	MEX	José Carlos Robles (on loan to Venados)
88	FW	MEX	Daniel Ramírez (on loan to Celaya)
110	MF	MEX	David Franco (loan return to Morelia)
295	DF	MEX	Érik Lira (on loan to Necaxa)
297	MF	MEX	Juan José Miguel (on loan to Venados)
—	GK	MEX	Alejandro Palacios (unattached, previously on loan at Atlético San Luis)
—	DF	MEX	Érik Vera (unattached, previously on loan at Atlético San Luis)
—	DF	MEX	Orlando Pineda (unattached, previously on loan at Oaxaca)
—	MF	MEX	Diego Barrón (unattached, previously on loan at Venados)
—	MF	MEX	Alejandro Castro (on loan to Santos Laguna, previously on loan at Atlético San Luis)
—	MF	MEX	Fernando Espinosa (unattached, previously on loan at Celaya)
—	FW	MEX	Alfonso Nieto (on loan to (Venezuela) Carabobo, previously on loan at (Costa Rica) Herediano)
—	FW	MEX	Santiago Palacios (to (Spain) San Agustín, previously on loan at Atlético San Luis)

=== Veracruz ===
In: Note: Flags indicate national team as defined under FIFA eligibility rules; some limited exceptions apply. Players may hold more than one non-FIFA nationality.

No.	Pos.	Nation	Player
3	DF	MEX	Enrique Pérez (on loan from Atlas, previously on loan at Tapachula)
4	DF	ECU	Luis Caicedo (on loan from UANL; previously with (Ecuador) Barcelona, on loan from (Brazil) Cruzeiro)
8	MF	MEX	Luis Miguel Noriega (on loan from Querétaro)
9	FW	ARG	Lautaro Rinaldi (from (Italy) Brescia)
10	MF	CHI	Joe Abrigo (on loan from (Chile) Audax Italiano)
14	MF	ARG	Rodrigo Noya (loan return from Oaxaca)
17	MF	MEX	Hibert Ruíz (on loan from Morelia, previously on loan at UdeG)
18	DF	MEX	Osmar Mares (from América, previously on loan)
23	FW	CHI	Bryan Carrasco (from (Chile) Audax Italiano)
26	MF	MEX	Ronaldo Prieto (loan return from Orizaba)

Out: Note: Flags indicate national team as defined under FIFA eligibility rules; some limited exceptions apply. Players may hold more than one non-FIFA nationality.

No.	Pos.	Nation	Player
2	DF	PER	Christian Ramos (to (Saudi Arabia) Al-Nassr)
3	DF	ARG	Lucas Rodríguez (on loan to (Argentina) Tigre)
4	DF	VEN	José Manuel Velázquez (unattached)
7	FW	ARG	Martín Bravo (to (Argentina) San Martín de San Juan)
8	MF	MEX	Manuel Viniegra (loan return to UANL)
9	FW	COL	Miguel Murillo (loan return to (Colombia) Deportivo Cali)
10	FW	ARG	Daniel Villalva (on loan to Querétaro)
12	DF	MEX	Miguel Cancela (to Orizaba)
16	MF	URU	Juan Albín (to (Cyprus) Omonia)
17	FW	BRA	Neto Berola (loan return to (Brazil) Coritiba)
19	MF	MEX	Édgar Andrade (to Tapachula)
23	MF	MEX	Richard Ruíz (to Toluca)
26	FW	MEX	Jesús Lara (loan return to Cruz Azul)
27	MF	MEX	Óscar Vera (unattached)
30	FW	MEX	Ángel López (loan return to Monterrey)
31	MF	URU	Matías Santos (to (Uruguay) Defensor Sporting)
33	MF	BRA	Alan Santos (loan return to UANL)
96	MF	MEX	Javier Sánchez (loan return to Atlante)
122	DF	MEX	Arturo Avilés (loan return to Atlante)
—	GK	PER	Carlos Cáceda (on loan to (Peru) Real Garcilaso, previously on loan at (Peru) Deportivo Municipal)
—	GK	MEX	Leonín Pineda (on loan to Tampico Madero)
—	DF	MEX	Leobardo López (on loan to Necaxa, previously on loan at Celaya)
—	MF	URU	Rafael Acosta (to (Czech Republic) Jablonec, previously on loan at (Czech Republic) Zbrojovka Brno)
—	MF	COL	José David Leudo (to (India) NorthEast United, previously on loan at (Colombia) Atlético Huila)
—	MF	MEX	Luis Sánchez (on loan to Celaya, previously on loan at Venados)
—	FW	MEX	Kevin Favela (to Celaya, previously on loan)
—	FW	COL	Juan Pérez (to Pachuca, previously on loan at Celaya)
