= 2015 CONCACAF U-17 Championship squads =

Football championship squads in a 2015 U-17 game

== Group A ==
=== Cuba ===
Head Coach: (Cuba) Fidel Salazar

No.	Pos.	Player	Date of birth (age)	Club
1	GK	Lazaro Garcia	{{{age}}}	{{{club}}}
2	DF	Felipe Hurtado	{{{age}}}	{{{club}}}
3	DF	Dariel Morejón	{{{age}}}	{{{club}}}
4	DF	Carlos Borromeo	{{{age}}}	{{{club}}}
5	MF	Jansiel Blanco	{{{age}}}	{{{club}}}
6	MF	Jonathan Ramirez	{{{age}}}	{{{club}}}
7	MF	Raycharles Herrera	{{{age}}}	{{{club}}}
8	FW	Yosniel Gonzalez	{{{age}}}	{{{club}}}
9	FW	Carlos Sebrango	{{{age}}}	{{{club}}}
10	MF	Eduard Puga	{{{age}}}	{{{club}}}
11	FW	Nelson Betancourt	{{{age}}}	{{{club}}}
12	GK	Jesus Hernandez	{{{age}}}	{{{club}}}
13	MF	Serguey Campillo	{{{age}}}	{{{club}}}
14	DF	YonDaller Hernandez	{{{age}}}	{{{club}}}
15	DF	Jeffrey Delgado	{{{age}}}	{{{club}}}
16	FW	Brian Savigne	{{{age}}}	{{{club}}}
17	MF	Yordan Alonso	{{{age}}}	{{{club}}}
18	MF	Neisser Sando	{{{age}}}	{{{club}}}
19	DF	Omar Romeo	{{{age}}}	{{{club}}}
20	GK	Yordanis Barreto	{{{age}}}	{{{club}}}

=== Guatemala ===
Head coach: (Guatemala) Juan Manuel Funes

No.	Pos.	Player	Date of birth (age)	Club
1	GK	Angel Castro		
2	DF	David Ramos		
3	DF	Ganzalo Deras		
4	DF	Fernando Fuentes		
5	DF	Mario Rodas		
6	MF	Stefan Behrens		
7	FW	Esteban Garcia		
8	MF	Alvaro Velasquez		
9	FW	Francisco Spross		
10	MF	John Mendez		
11	MF	Diego Raymundo		
12	GK	Gilder Lemus		
13	MF	Victor Valdez		
14	MF	Erick Soto		
15	MF	Armando Aroche		
16	MF	Moises Orellana		
17	DF	Abel Lemus		
18	DF	Juan Riley		
19	FW	Oliver Diaz		
20	MF	Richard Rodriguez		

=== Honduras ===
Head Coach: (Honduras) José Valladares

No.	Pos.	Player	Date of birth (age)	Club
1	GK	José Aguiluz		(National Autonomous Federation of Football of Honduras) Honduras
2	DF	Víctor Matamoros	8 October 1998 (aged 16)	(National Autonomous Federation of Football of Honduras) Olimpia
3	DF	Wesly Decas		(National Autonomous Federation of Football of Honduras) Pumas UNAH
4	DF	Allan Rivera	23 March 1998 (aged 16)	(National Autonomous Federation of Football of Honduras) Real España
5	DF	Dylan Andrade	11 March 1998 (aged 17)	(National Autonomous Federation of Football of Honduras) Platense
6	MF	Jorge Álvarez		(National Autonomous Federation of Football of Honduras) Valencia
7	FW	Foslyn Grant	4 October 1998 (aged 16)	(National Autonomous Federation of Football of Honduras) Motagua
8	MF	Erick Arias		(National Autonomous Federation of Football of Honduras) Comayagua
9	FW	Darixon Vuelto	15 January 1998 (aged 17)	(National Autonomous Federation of Football of Honduras) Victoria
10	MF	Óscar Castro	16 February 1998 (aged 17)	(National Autonomous Federation of Football of Honduras) Real España
11	FW	Oslin Sevilla		(National Autonomous Federation of Football of Honduras) Real España
12	GK	Michael Perelló	11 July 1998 (aged 16)	(National Autonomous Federation of Football of Honduras) Platense
13	FW	Wisdom Quaye	8 April 1998 (aged 16)	(National Autonomous Federation of Football of Honduras) Vida
14	FW	David Sánchez	19 March 1998 (aged 16)	(National Autonomous Federation of Football of Honduras) Olimpia
15	MF	José Galeado		(National Autonomous Federation of Football of Honduras) Juvenil
16	MF	Jeancarlo Vargas	16 May 1998 (aged 16)	(National Autonomous Federation of Football of Honduras) Platense
17	DF	Denil Maldonado	25 May 1998 (aged 16)	(National Autonomous Federation of Football of Honduras) Motagua
18	FW	Kevin Castro	9 October 1998 (aged 16)	(National Autonomous Federation of Football of Honduras) Motagua
19	DF	Gabriel Ortiz	9 February 1998 (aged 17)	(National Autonomous Federation of Football of Honduras) Olimpia
20	DF	Darwin Diego		(National Autonomous Federation of Football of Honduras) Tela

=== Jamaica ===
Head Coach: (Jamaica) Andrew Edwards

No.	Pos.	Player	Date of birth (age)	Club
1	GK	Akeem Chambers		
2	DF	Javain Brown		
3	DF	Donovan Dawkins		
4	MF	Shandel Senior		
5	DF	Jahwani Hinds		
6	MF	Fabian Grant		
7	MF	Peter-Lee Vassell		
8	MF	Tajea Brown		
9	MF	Nicholas Nelson		
10	FW	Alex Marshall		
11	MF	Anson Lewis		
12	DF	Antoniel Mullings		
13	GK	Jahmali Waite		
14	MF	Hakim Williams		
15	MF	Deshane Beckford		
16	DF	Jahlanie Hammond		
17	DF	Ajeanie Talbott		
18	MF	Chris-Andrew Dixon		
19	DF	Nathaniel Adamolekun		
20	MF	Demar James		

=== Trinidad and Tobago ===
Head coach: Shawn Cooper

No.	Pos.	Player	Date of birth (age)	Club
1		Levi Fernandez		
2		Isaiah Garcia		
3		Keston Julien		
4		Tekay Hoyce		
5		Shirwin Noel		
6		Kareem Riley		
7		Shakeem Patrick		
8		Joshua Burnett		
9		Chaz Burnett		
10		Morgan Bruce		
11		Jerren Nixon		
12		Kierron Mason		
13		Kishon Hackshaw		
14		Isaiah Hudson		
15		Darnell Hospedales		
16		Shobal Celestin		
17		Jeankeon Alexander		
18		John-Paul Rochford		
19		Noah Powder		
20		Tyrek James		

=== United States ===
Head Coach: (United States) Richie Williams

No.	Pos.	Player	Date of birth (age)	Caps	Goals	Club
1	GK	Will Pulisic	April 16, 1998 (aged 16)	16	0	(United States Soccer Federation) Richmond United
12	GK	Kevin Silva	January 5, 1998 (aged 17)	15	0	(United States Soccer Federation) Players Development Academy
2	DF	Matthew Olosunde	March 7, 1998 (aged 16)	22	0	(United States Soccer Federation) New York Red Bulls
5	DF	Hugo Arellano (C)	March 5, 1998 (aged 16)	21	1	(United States Soccer Federation) LA Galaxy
4	DF	Alexis Velela	April 17, 1998 (aged 16)	20	1	(United States Soccer Federation) San Diego Surf
15	DF	Danny Barbir	January 31, 1998 (aged 16)	16	0	(The Football Association) West Bromwich Albion
3	DF	John Nelson	July 11, 1998 (aged 16)	16	0	(United States Soccer Federation) Internationals
14	DF	Tanner Dieterich	April 5, 1998 (aged 16)	15	0	(United States Soccer Federation) Real Salt Lake
18	DF	Tyler Adams	February 14, 1999 (aged 15)	14	0	(United States Soccer Federation) New York Red Bulls
10	MF	Christian Pulisic	September 18, 1998 (aged 16)	27	18	(German Football Association) Borussia Dortmund
8	MF	Luca de la Torre	May 23, 1998 (aged 16)	22	1	(The Football Association) Fulham
6	MF	Eric Calvillo	January 2, 1998 (aged 17)	21	0	(United States Soccer Federation) Real So Cal
20	MF	Alejandro Zendejas	February 7, 1998 (aged 16)	20	3	(United States Soccer Federation) FC Dallas Development Academy
16	MF	Thomas McCabe	April 4, 1998 (aged 16)	18	0	(United States Soccer Federation) Players Development Academy
7	FW	Haji Wright	March 27, 1998 (aged 16)	26	24	(German Football Association) Schalke 04
13	FW	McKinze Gaines	March 2, 1998 (aged 16)	22	5	(United States Soccer Federation) Lonestar SC
17	FW	Pierre Da Silva	July 28, 1998 (aged 16)	22	2	(United States Soccer Federation) Orlando City
11	FW	Joshua Pérez	January 21, 1998 (aged 16)	18	1	(Italian Football Federation) Fiorentina
9	FW	Joe Gallardo	January 1, 1998 (aged 17)	11	9	(Mexican Football Federation) Monterrey
19	FW	Brandon Vazquez	February 10, 1998 (aged 16)	1	3	(Mexican Football Federation) Tijuana

== Group B ==
=== Canada ===
Head Coach: (Canada) Sean Fleming

No.	Pos.	Player	Date of birth (age)	Caps	Goals	Club
1	GK	Luciano Trasolini				(Canadian Soccer Association) Vancouver Whitecaps FC
18	GK	Brogan Engbers				(Canadian Soccer Association) Toronto FC
2	DF	Kadin Chung				(Canadian Soccer Association) Vancouver Whitecaps FC
3	DF	Andrew Dias				(Canadian Soccer Association) Toronto FC
4	DF	Matthew Baldisimo (C)				(Canadian Soccer Association) Vancouver Whitecaps FC
5	DF	Kosovar Sadiki				(The Football Association) Stoke City
16	DF	Dante Campbell				(Canadian Soccer Association) Toronto FC
19	DF	Gabriel Boakye				(Canadian Soccer Association) Toronto FC
6	MF	Munir Saleh				(Canadian Soccer Association) Vancouver Whitecaps FC
8	MF	Harrison Paton				(The Football Association) Fulham
9	MF	Ballou Jean-Yves Tabla				Unattached
10	MF	Tristan Borges				(Canadian Soccer Association) Toronto FC
12	MF	Thomas Mickoski				(Canadian Soccer Association) North Toronto Nitros
13	MF	Aidan Daniels				(Canadian Soccer Association) Toronto FC
20	MF	Richie Ennin				(Canadian Soccer Association) Toronto FC
7	FW	Duwayne Ewart				Unattached
11	FW	Malik Johnson				(Canadian Soccer Association) Toronto FC
14	FW	Daniel Sagno				(Canadian Soccer Association) Vancouver Whitecaps FC
15	FW	Cyrus Rollocks				(Canadian Soccer Association) Toronto FC
17	FW	Terran Campbell				(Canadian Soccer Association) Vancouver Whitecaps FC

=== Costa Rica ===
Head coach: (Argentina) Marcelo Herrera

No.	Pos.	Player	Date of birth (age)	Club
1		Alejandro Barrientos		
2		Diego Mesén		
3		Pablo Arboine		
4		Ian Smith		
5		Esteban González		
6		Luis Hernández		
7		Kevin Masís		
8		Jaylon Hadden		
9		Andy Reyes		
10		Jonathan Martínez		
11		Barlon Sequeira		
12		Aarón Murillo		
13		Yostin Salinas		
14		Roberto Córdoba		
15		Daniel Villegas		
16		Mario Morales		
17		Brandon Salazar		
18		Patrick Sequeira		
19		Jostin Daly		
20		Eduardo Juárez		

=== Haiti ===
Head coach: (France) Marc Chèze

No.	Pos.	Player	Date of birth (age)	Club
1		Bernado Constant		
2		Ulysse Denso		
3		Denilson Pierre		
4		Jerome Odilon		
5		Joseph Junior		
6		Metellus Saul		
7		Charles Bellora		
8		Dede Kenley		
9		Claude Davidson		
10		Johnson Jeudy		
11		Gay Schneider		
12		Chery Emmanuel		
13		Paul Fernandes		
14		Thermidor Fils-Aime		
15		Damus Ronaldo		
16		Bissainthe Bicou		
17		Maitre Jude		
18		Charles John-Peter		
19		Pierre Fredyson		
20		Jeune Peterson Junior		

=== Mexico ===
Head Coach: (Mexico) Mario Arteaga

No.	Pos.	Player	Date of birth (age)	Caps	Goals	Club
1	GK	Abraham Romero	February 18, 1998 (age 28)	6	0	(United States Soccer Federation) LA Galaxy
12	GK	Fernando Hernández	January 2, 1998 (age 28)	0	0	(Mexican Football Federation) Monterrey
2	DF	Diego Cortés	June 18, 1998 (age 27)	6	0	(Mexican Football Federation) Guadalajara
3	DF	José Joaquín Esquivel	January 7, 1998 (age 28)	6	0	(Mexican Football Federation) Mineros de Zacatecas
4	DF	Francisco Venegas	July 16, 1998 (age 27)	6	1	(Mexican Football Federation) Pachuca
5	DF	Ulises Torres	February 17, 1998 (age 28)	6	4	(Mexican Football Federation) América
13	DF	Cristian González	February 26, 1998 (age 28)	0	0	(Mexican Football Federation) Atlas
14	DF	Bryan Salazar	February 25, 1998 (age 28)	1	0	(Mexican Football Federation) Guadalajara
15	DF	Edwin Lara	September 8, 1999 (age 26)	0	0	(Mexican Football Federation) Pachuca
6	MF	Alan Cervantes	January 17, 1998 (age 28)	6	0	(Mexican Football Federation) Guadalajara
7	MF	Kevin Lara	April 18, 1998 (age 28)	5	2	(Mexican Football Federation) Santos Laguna
8	MF	Pablo López	January 7, 1998 (age 28)	6	1	(Mexican Football Federation) Pachuca
11	MF	Kevin Magaña	February 1, 1998 (age 28)	6	1	(Mexican Football Federation) Guadalajara
16	MF	Alejandro Zamudio	February 25, 1998 (age 28)	4	0	(Mexican Football Federation) UNAM
17	MF	Martín Rodríguez	May 18, 1998 (age 27)	1	0	(Mexican Football Federation) Querétaro
19	MF	Iván Gutiérrez	February 16, 1998 (age 28)	3	0	(United States Soccer Federation) Chivas USA
9	FW	Eduardo Aguirre	August 3, 1998 (age 27)	6	1	(Mexican Football Federation) Santos Laguna
10	FW	Claudio Zamudio	March 30, 1998 (age 28)	6	3	(Mexican Football Federation) Morelia
18	FW	José Gurrola	April 15, 1998 (age 28)	6	2	(Mexican Football Federation) Guadalajara
20	FW	Ramón Salas	March 19, 1998 (age 28)	4	0	(Mexican Football Federation) Guadalajara

=== Panama ===
Head coach: Juan Carlos Cubillas

No.	Pos.	Player	Date of birth (age)	Club
1		Marcos Meléndez		
2		John Del Busto		
3		Jorge Gutiérrez		
4		Luis Arias		
5		César Blackman		
6		Randolph Ramos		
7		José Rodríguez		
8		Carlos Kirton		
9		Ronaldo Córdoba		
10		Dámaso Santos		
11		Leandro Avila		
12		Javier Cruz		
13		Emmanuel Chanis		
14		Andrés Andrade		
15		George Picart		
16		Kevin Nelson		
17		Chamell Asprilla		
18		Oliver Beckles		
19		Javier Rivera		
20		Adalberto Carrasquilla		

=== Saint Lucia ===
Head coach: (Saint Lucia) Cassim Louis

No.	Pos.	Player	Date of birth (age)	Club
1		Viannie George		
2		Ryi Maryat		
3		Keeroy Lionel		
4		Zachernus Simon		
5		Harrison Moffat		
6		Melvin Doxilly		
7		Noah Nicholas		
8		Nyrone Winter		
9		Jhadel Prospere		
10		Cassius Joseph		
11		Jamie Prospere		
12		Antoine Wilfred		
13		Lael Cherry		
14		Edward O'Neal		
15		Anton Paul		
16		Vino Barclett		
17		Albertini Philip		
18		Bradley Cyril		
19		Alvinus Myers		
20		Andre Gustave		
