= 2015 CONCACAF U-17 Championship =

Association football tournament for under-17 national teams

Tournament details
- Host country: Honduras
- City: San Pedro Sula
- Dates: 27 February – 15 March
- Teams: 12 (from 1 confederation)
- Venue: 2 (in 1 host city)

Final positions
- Champions: Mexico (6th title)
- Runners-up: Honduras
- Third place: United States
- Fourth place: Costa Rica

Tournament statistics
- Matches played: 33
- Goals scored: 113 (3.42 per match)
- Top scorer(s): (Panama) Ronaldo Córdoba (6 goals)

The 2015 CONCACAF U-17 Championship was a scheduled age-restricted international association football tournament organised by CONCACAF. The competition was used to determine the four CONCACAF representatives at the 2015 FIFA U-17 World Cup in Chile. The competition was hosted by Honduras.

== Qualified teams ==
Team	Qualification	Appearances	Previous best performances	FIFA U-17 World Cup Participations
North American zone
Canada	Automatic	15th	Runners-up (2011)	6
Mexico (TH)	Automatic	15th	Champions (**1985**, 1987, 1991, 1996, 2013)	11
United States	Automatic	16th	Champions (1983, 1992, 2011)	14
Central American zone qualified through the Central America qualifying
Honduras	Host	16th	Fourth place (1983, 1985, **1987**, 2013)	3
Costa Rica	Triangular 1 winner	15th	Champions (1994)	8
Panama	Triangular 2 winner	7th	Runners-up (**2013**)	2
Guatemala	Repechage playoff winner	10th	Quarterfinals (2013)	0
Caribbean zone qualified through the Caribbean qualifying
Haiti	Group A winner	6th	Final round group winner (2007)	1
Saint Lucia	Group A runner-up	2nd	Group stage (1988)	0
Jamaica	Group B winner	12th	Final round group winner (**1999**)	2
Cuba	Group B runner-up	9th	Champions (1988)	2
Trinidad and Tobago	Best third place	13th	Runners-up (**1983**)	2

Note: no titles or runners-up between 1999 and 2007.
Bold indicates that the corresponding team was hosting the event.

== Venues ==
2015 CONCACAF U-17 Championship is located in Honduras	San Pedro Sula	
2015 CONCACAF U-17 Championship is located in Honduras	Estadio Francisco Morazán	Estadio Olímpico Metropolitano
2015 CONCACAF U-17 Championship is located in Honduras	Capacity: 18,000	Capacity: 37,325

== New format ==
Previously there were four groups of three teams during the group stage of the competition, each team played a minimum of two games and the previous format had a total of 20 matches. As from 2015 there will be two groups of six teams, each team will play a minimum of five games and the competition will have a total of 33 matches. CONCACAF stated that the new format would aid development and competition.

The knockout phase, which included eight matches, consisted of four quarterfinals, two semifinals, a third-place playoff and a final, has been replaced with two playoff games and a final.

== Draw ==
The draw took place on 8 December at the Chamber of Commerce and Industries of Cortés, Honduras.

On 2 December 2014, CONCACAF announced the procedure of the draw. The 12 teams were divided into three differing pots:

Pot	Teams
Pot 1 (Central America)	Honduras; Costa Rica; Panama; Guatemala
Pot 2 (Caribbean)	Cuba; Haiti; Jamaica; Saint Lucia; Trinidad and Tobago
Pot 3 (North America)	Canada; Mexico; United States
Pot A (Seeding for Group A)	Six balls with a group positions, 1-6
Pot B (Seeding for Group B)	Six balls with a group positions, 1-6

Prior to the draw, hosts Honduras were assigned to position A1. The remaining teams in Pot 1 were drawn, alternating between groups A and B. Teams were assigned a position from Pot A (Group A) or Pot B (Group B). After all teams had been drawn from Pot 1, the draw proceeded (continuing to alternate between Groups A and B) to Pot 2, then Pot 3.

== Squads ==
Only players born on or after 1 January 1998 were eligible to play in the tournament. Each participating national association had to provide a provisional list of twenty to thirty players to CONCACAF thirty days before their first match. A final twenty-man selection had to be provided upon arrival in the venue.

== Group stage ==
=== Group A ===
Pos	Team	Pld	W	D	L	GF	GA	GD	Pts	Qualification
1	Honduras (H)	5	3	2	0	9	4	+5	11	Final and 2015 FIFA U-17 World Cup
2	Jamaica	5	3	1	1	9	5	+4	10	Playoff stage
3	United States	5	3	1	1	13	4	+9	10	Playoff stage
4	Guatemala	5	1	1	3	7	9	−2	4	
5	Cuba	5	0	4	1	4	9	−5	4	
6	Trinidad and Tobago	5	0	1	4	4	15	−11	1	

Source: CONCACAF
Rules for classification: Tiebreakers
(H) Hosts

27 February 2015	Guatemala	4–1	Trinidad and Tobago	Estadio Francisco Morazán, San Pedro Sula
14:30	Raymundo 2', 54'; Valdez 10'; Lemus 45+2'	Report	Noel (red card) 39'; Julien 45'; Hudson (yellow card) 74'	Referee: Ricardo Montero (Costa Rica)

27 February 2015	United States	5–0	Cuba	Estadio Francisco Morazán, San Pedro Sula
17:00	Arellano 5'; Gallardo 40', 65', 88'; Zendejas 43' (yellow card) 51'; Wright (yellow card) 70'	Report	Hurtado (yellow card) 38'	Referee: Mathieu Bourdeau (Canada)

27 February 2015	Honduras	2–0	Jamaica	Estadio Francisco Morazán, San Pedro Sula
19:30	Vuelto 12'; Rivera (yellow card) 62'; Alvarez 78'; Matamoros (yellow card) 90'	Report	Brown (yellow card) 20'; Beckford (yellow card) 81'	Referee: Kimbell Ward (Saint Kitts and Nevis)

2 March 2015	Jamaica	2–1	Guatemala	Estadio Francisco Morazán, San Pedro Sula
14:30	Adamolekun 13' (yellow card) 67'; Vassell (yellow card) 45+2'; Brown (yellow card) 82'; Dawkins 90'	Report	Mendez 26'	Referee: Drew Fischer (Canada)

2 March 2015	Trinidad and Tobago	0–2	United States	Estadio Francisco Morazán, San Pedro Sula
17:00	Burnett (yellow card) 78'	Report	Gallardo 31'; Wright 71'; McCabe (yellow card) 74'; Olosunde (yellow card) 86'	Referee: Adrian Skeete (Barbados)

2 March 2015	Cuba	1–1	Honduras	Estadio Francisco Morazán, San Pedro Sula
19:30	Herrera 78'	Report	Grant 50'; Arias (yellow card) 90+2'	Referee: César Arturo Ramos (Mexico)

5 March 2015	Cuba	1–1	Jamaica	Estadio Francisco Morazán, San Pedro Sula
14:30	Puga 47' (yellow card) 76'	Report	Marshall (yellow card) 40'; Adamolekun 53'; Bartley (yellow card) 54'; James (yellow card) 84' (red card) 90+3'	Referee: Kimbell Ward (Saint Kitts and Nevis)

5 March 2015	Guatemala	1–4	United States	Estadio Francisco Morazán, San Pedro Sula
17:00	Soto 65'; Rodas (yellow card) 69'; Garcia (yellow card) 73'	Report	Pérez 10', 20', 45+1'; DaSilva 48'	Referee: Ricardo Montero (Costa Rica)

5 March 2015	Honduras	2–0	Trinidad and Tobago	Estadio Francisco Morazán, San Pedro Sula
19:30	Rivera (yellow card) 50'; Andrade 53'; Quaye 90'	Report	Patrick (yellow card) 13'; Alexander (yellow card) 90+4'	Referee: Mathieu Bourdeau (Canada)

8 March 2015	Trinidad and Tobago	1–5	Jamaica	Estadio Francisco Morazán, San Pedro Sula
14:30	Hoyce (yellow card) 18'; Powder 44'	Report	Williams (yellow card) 36'; Vassell 39'; Senior (yellow card) 42'; Adamolekun 45+3'; Brown 80', 85'; Hammond (yellow card) 87'; Dawkins 90'	Referee: Drew Fischer (Canada)

8 March 2015	Cuba	0–0	Guatemala	Estadio Francisco Morazán, San Pedro Sula
17:00	Hurtado (yellow card) 29'; Hernandez (yellow card) 65'	Report	Raymundo (yellow card) 61'; Behrens (yellow card) 81'; Diaz (red card) 90+3'	Referee: Jose Antonio Kellys Marquez (Panama)

8 March 2015	United States	2–2	Honduras	Estadio Francisco Morazán, San Pedro Sula
19:30	De la Torre 23'; Pérez 32'; Gallardo (yellow card) 45'; Arellano (yellow card) 65'	Report	Matamoros 16'; Maldonado (yellow card) 38'; Sanchez 87'; Alvarez (red card) 90'; Arias (yellow card) 90+'	Referee: César Arturo Ramos (Mexico)

11 March 2015	Trinidad and Tobago	2–2	Cuba	Estadio Francisco Morazán, San Pedro Sula
14:30	Riley 65'; Powder 71'; Burnett (yellow card) 82'	Report	Puga 6'; Ramirez (yellow card) 61'; Borromeo 84' (yellow card) 90+2'	Referee: William Anderson (Puerto Rico)

11 March 2015	United States	0–1	Jamaica	Estadio Francisco Morazán, San Pedro Sula
17:00	Arellano (yellow card) 56'	Report	Grant (yellow card) 44'; Nelson 57' (pen.) (yellow card) 85'	Referee: Ricardo Montero (Costa Rica)

11 March 2015	Honduras	2–1	Guatemala	Estadio Francisco Morazán, San Pedro Sula
19:30	Rivera 8' (pen.); Vuelto 38'; Quaye (yellow card) 73'	Report	Lemus (yellow card) 6'; Rodas (red card) 7'; Garcia 26'; Orellana (yellow card) 78'	Referee: Mathieu Bourdeau (Canada)

=== Group B ===
Pos	Team	Pld	W	D	L	GF	GA	GD	Pts	Qualification
1	Mexico	5	3	2	0	13	3	+10	11	Final and 2015 FIFA U-17 World Cup
2	Canada	5	3	1	1	10	6	+4	10	Playoff stage
3	Costa Rica	5	3	1	1	13	5	+8	10	Playoff stage
4	Panama	5	3	0	2	15	7	+8	9	
5	Haiti	5	1	0	4	6	17	−11	3	
6	Saint Lucia	5	0	0	5	4	23	−19	0	

Source: CONCACAF
Rules for classification: Tiebreakers

28 February 2015	Panama	1–3	Mexico	Estadio Olímpico Metropolitano, San Pedro Sula
14:30	Córdoba 37'; Arias (yellow card) 28'	Report	C. Zamudio 5'; Chanis 25' (o.g.); López (yellow card) 45'; Aguirre 54'; Cortés (yellow card) 58'	Referee: Óscar Moncada (Honduras)

28 February 2015	Saint Lucia	0–4	Costa Rica	Estadio Olímpico Metropolitano, San Pedro Sula
17:00	Myers (yellow card) 24'; Doxilly (yellow card) 90'	Report	Reyes 31', 52'; Córdoba (yellow card) 43'; Masís 49', 68'	Referee: Karl Tyrell (Jamaica)

28 February 2015	Canada	3–1	Haiti	Estadio Olímpico Metropolitano, San Pedro Sula
19:30	Tabla (yellow card) 4'; Ewart 34'; Baldisimo 45+2'; Chung 73'	Report	Damus 32'; Jerome (yellow card) 41'; Joseph (yellow card) 51'; Jeudy (yellow card) 90+3'	Referee: Christopher Reid (Belize)

3 March 2015	Haiti	0–7	Panama	Estadio Olímpico Metropolitano, San Pedro Sula
14:30	Thermidor (yellow card) 28'; Damus (yellow card) 35'; Joseph (red card) 42'	Report	Córdoba 9', 20'; Avila 13', 51'; Beckles 19'; Carrasquilla 44'; Rodríguez 79'	Referee: Edvin Jurisevic (United States)

3 March 2015	Mexico	6–0	Saint Lucia	Estadio Olímpico Metropolitano, San Pedro Sula
17:00	A. Zamudio (yellow card) 22'; Torres 43', 90+4'; Magaña 58'; Gurrola 61', 76'; K. Lara 72'	Report		Referee: Mario Escobar (Guatemala)

3 March 2015	Costa Rica	2–3	Canada	Estadio Olímpico Metropolitano, San Pedro Sula
19:30	Martínez 17' (pen.); Villegas (yellow card) 19'; Reyes 47'; Arboine (yellow card) 56'	Report	Baldisimo (yellow card) 16'; Ewart 31'; Sagno 57' (pen.); Sadiki (yellow card) 64' (goal) 67'; Tabla (yellow card) 83'; Trasolinin (yellow card) 89'	Referee: William Anderson (Puerto Rico)

6 March 2015	Costa Rica	4–1	Haiti	Estadio Olímpico Metropolitano, San Pedro Sula
14:30	Daly 3', 8'; Smith (yellow card) 45'; Reyes 67'; González 69'	Report	Dede 21'; Pierre (yellow card) 28' (yellow card) 35' (red card)	Referee: Christopher Reid (Belize)

6 March 2015	Panama	6–2	Saint Lucia	Estadio Olímpico Metropolitano, San Pedro Sula
17:00	Córdoba 17', 18', 33'; Beckles 36', 40'; Blackman (yellow card) 55'; Del Busto (yellow card) 62'; Picart 74'; Gutiérrez (yellow card) 89'	Report	Philip 12'; Joseph (yellow card) 76'; Nicholas 82'	Referee: Karl Tyrell (Jamaica)

6 March 2015	Canada	1–1	Mexico	Estadio Olímpico Metropolitano, San Pedro Sula
19:30	Sadiki (yellow card) 36'; Borges 41'	Report	Torres 19'	Referee: Óscar Moncada (Honduras)

9 March 2015	Mexico	2–0	Haiti	Estadio Olímpico Metropolitano, San Pedro Sula
14:30	Venegas (yellow card) 34' (goal) 71'; López 38' (pen.)	Report	Charles (yellow card) 29'; Dede (yellow card) 90+2'	Referee: Tristley Bassue (Saint Kitts and Nevis)

9 March 2015	Costa Rica	2–0	Panama	Estadio Olímpico Metropolitano, San Pedro Sula
17:00	Blackman 77' (o.g.); Reyes (yellow card) 80'; Córdoba (yellow card) 84'; Daly 87'; Juárez (yellow card) 90+2'	Report	Del Busto (yellow card) 6'; Arias (yellow card) 13'; Chanis (yellow card) 41'; Rodríguez (red card) 90'	Referee: Edvin Jurisevic (United States)

9 March 2015	Saint Lucia	1–3	Canada	Estadio Olímpico Metropolitano, San Pedro Sula
19:30	Winter 44'	Report	Sagno 34'; Ewart 35'; Tabla 57'	Referee: Mario Escobar (Guatemala)

12 March 2015	Mexico	1–1	Costa Rica	Estadio Olímpico Metropolitano, San Pedro Sula
14:30	Esquivel (yellow card) 34'; C. Zamudio 50'; Aguirre (yellow card) 58'	Report	Masís (yellow card) 57'; Sequeira 85'	Referee: Adrian Skeete (Barbados)

12 March 2015	Saint Lucia	1–4	Haiti	Estadio Olímpico Metropolitano, San Pedro Sula
17:00	Nicholas 2'; Simon (yellow card) 14'	Report	Damus 9', 31', 45'; Jeudy 64'	Referee: Jose Antonio Kellys Marquez (Panama)

12 March 2015	Canada	0–1	Panama	Estadio Olímpico Metropolitano, San Pedro Sula
19:30	Johnson (yellow card) 80'; Ewart (yellow card) 90+2'	Report	Santos 9'; Gutiérrez (yellow card) 14'; Nelson (yellow card) 69'	Referee: Karl Tyrell (Jamaica)

== Final stage ==
In the final stage, if a match was level at the end of normal playing time, penalty shoot-out was used to determine the winner (no extra time was played).

=== Playoff stage ===
The second-and third-place teams from each group were re-seeded by group stage results, with the best team facing the fourth-best team, and the second-best team facing the third-best team.

Ranking of second and third-placed teams

Seed	Grp	Team	Pld	W	D	L	GF	GA	GD	Pts
1	A	United States	5	3	1	1	13	4	+9	10
2	B	Costa Rica	5	3	1	1	13	5	+8	10
3	B	Canada	5	3	1	1	10	6	+4	10
4	A	Jamaica	5	3	1	1	9	5	+4	10

First match(es) will be played: 27 February 2015. Source: CONCACAF
Rules for classification: Tiebreakers

Because all four teams finished with the same number of points and not all of them faced each other, the first playoff tiebreaker used for reseeding was goal differential in all group matches. Because two teams were tied on goal differential, the No. 3 and 4 seeds were determined based on total goals scored in the tournament. This resulted in both third-place teams being ranked ahead of both second-place teams.

15 March 2015
15:00

Costa Rica	3−0	Canada
Hernández 18'; Reyes 27'; Sakiki 74' (o.g.)	Report

Estadio Olímpico Metropolitano, San Pedro Sula
Referee: César Ramos (Mexico)

15 March 2015
18:00

United States	0−0	Jamaica
	Report
Penalties
C. Pulisic (penalty missed); Gallardo (penalty scored); Barbir (penalty scored); Zendejas (penalty scored); Nelson (penalty scored); Velela (penalty scored)	5−4	(penalty scored) Nelson; (penalty missed) Hinds; (penalty scored) Hammond; (penalty scored) Senior; (penalty scored) Talbott; (penalty missed) Marshall

Estadio Olímpico Metropolitano, San Pedro Sula
Referee: Óscar Moncada (Honduras)

Costa Rica and the United States qualified for the 2015 FIFA U-17 World Cup.

=== Final ===
15 March 2015
21:00

Honduras	0−3	Mexico
	Report	Magaña 7'; C. Zamudio 15'; Torres 50'

Estadio Olímpico Metropolitano, San Pedro Sula
Referee: Ricardo Montero (Costa Rica)

Both Honduras and Mexico qualified for the 2015 FIFA U-17 World Cup.

== Top goalscorers ==
Players with three or more goals:

6 goals

- (Panama) Ronaldo Córdoba

5 goals

- (Costa Rica) Andy Reyes

4 goals

- (Haiti) Ronaldo Damus
- (Mexico) Ulises Torres
- (United States) Joe Gallardo
- (United States) Joshua Pérez

3 goals

- (Canada) Duwayne Ewart
- (Costa Rica) Jostin Daly
- (Jamaica) Nathaniel Adamolekun
- (Mexico) Claudio Zamudio
- (Panama) Oliver Beckles
