= Arturo Avilés =

Arturo Avilés may refer to:

- Arturo Avilés (footballer, born 1961) (1961–2019), Mexican football manager and defender
- Arturo Avilés (footballer, born 1994), Mexican football defender
