= Basketball at the 2011 Pan American Games – Women's team rosters =

Team rosters for the women's basketball tournament at the 2011 Pan American Games in Guadalajara, Mexico.

== Puerto Rico ==
The Puerto Rico women's national basketball team roster for the 2011 Pan American Games.

Puerto Rico women's national basketball team – 2011 Pan American Games roster
Players
Coaches

Pos.	No.	Name	Age – Date of birth	Height	Club
	4	Bermudez, Angelica	–
	5	Rosado, Pamela	–
	6	Sepulveda, Jazmine	–
	7	Valentin, Cynthia	–
	8	Cortijo, Carla	–
	9	Pacheco, Michelle	–
	10	Jones, Yolanda	–
	11	Gonzalez, Michelle	–
	12	Morales, Angiely	–
	13	Escalera, Carla	–
	14	Placido, Mari	–
	15	Vargas, Esmary	–

Head coach

- Gonzalez, Omar

Assistant coach(es)

- Cintron, Raymond

== Mexico ==
The Mexico women's national basketball team roster for the 2011 Pan American Games.

Mexico women's national basketball team – 2011 Pan American Games roster
Players
Coaches

Pos.	No.	Name	Age – Date of birth	Height	Club
	4	Castro, Alexis	–
	5	Bibbs, Marie	–
	6	De Anda, Lourdes	–
	7	Garcia, Abril	–
	8	Ortega, Sonia	–
	9	Silva, Brisa	–
	10	Ornelas, Maylene	–
	11	Garcia, Monica	–
	12	Nuñez, Laura	–
	13	Gomez, Erika	–
	14	Gutierrez, Fernanda	–
	15	Garcia, Sofia	–

Head coach

- Santana, Jose

Assistant coach(es)

- Castañeda, Sergio
- Sainz, Mirta
- Hernandez, Elena

== Brazil ==
The Brazil women's national basketball team roster for the 2011 Pan American Games.

Brazil women's national basketball team – 2011 Pan American Games roster
Players
Coaches

Pos.	No.	Name	Age – Date of birth	Height	Club
	4	De Queiroz, Barbara	–
	5	Marcal, Palmira	–
	6	Carcavalli, Tassia	–
	7	De Andrade, Izabela	–
	8	Marques, Iziane	–
	9	Silvestre, Jaqueline	–
	10	Valente, Silvia	–
	11	Justino, Gilmara	–
	12	Dantas, Damiris	–
	13	De Souza, Carina	–
	14	De Souza, Erika	–
	15	Dos Santos, Clarissa	–

Head coach

- Vecchi, Enio

Assistant coach(es)

- Paccini, Urubatan
- Arcain, Janeth

== Colombia ==
The Colombia women's national basketball team roster for the 2011 Pan American Games.

Colombia women's national basketball team – 2011 Pan American Games roster
Players
Coaches

Pos.	No.	Name	Age – Date of birth	Height	Club
	4	Mendoza, Ana	–
	5	Alonso, Myriam	–
	6	Garcia, Elisa	–
	7	Sanchez, Leidy	–
	8	Mosquera, Narlyn	–
	9	Palacio, Maria	–
	10	Martinez, Mabel	–
	11	Muñoz, Jenifer	–
	12	Olarte, Sara	–
	14	Quimbaya, Katherine	–
	13	Torres, Levys	–
	15	Diaz, Elena	–

Head coach

- Cuenca, Luis

Assistant coach(es)

- Cardona, Sergio
- Romero, Jairo

== Argentina ==
The Argentina women's national basketball team roster for the 2011 Pan American Games.

Argentina women's national basketball team – 2011 Pan American Games roster
Players
Coaches

Pos.	No.	Name	Age – Date of birth	Height	Club
	4	Flores, Nadia	–
	5	Santana, Ornella	–
	6	Reggiardo, Paula	–
	7	Cabrera, Diana	–
	8	Pérez, Natacha	–
	9	Cava, Marina	–
	10	Burani, Agostina	–
	11	Gretter, Melisa	–
	12	Pavon, Sandra	–
	13	Soriani, Melani	–
	14	Rojas, Rocio	–
	15	Pavicich, Melisa	–

Head coach

- Santin, Roberto

Assistant coach(es)

- Cordoba, Ronaldo
- Pugliese, Oscar

== Canada ==
The Canada women's national basketball team roster for the 2011 Pan American Games.

Canada women's national basketball team – 2011 Pan American Games roster
Players
Coaches

Pos.	No.	Name	Age – Date of birth	Height	Club
	4	Humbert, Jillian	–
	5	Purkovic, Isidora	–
	6	Ring, Kellie	–
	7	Colley, Justine	–
	8	Tatham, Alisha	25 – Oct 14, 1986	5 ft 11 in (1.8 m)
	9	Crozon, Paige	–
	10	Campbell, Taijah	–
	11	Pinske, Megan	–
	12	Wolfram, Emma	–
	13	Prince, Raelyn	–
	14	Ledingham, Lindsay	–
	15	Kiss-Rusk, Alexandria	–

Head coach

- McNeill, Allison

Assistant coach(es)

- Sinclair, Dani
- McAleenan, Erin

== United States ==
The United States women's national basketball team roster for the 2011 Pan American Games.

United States women's national basketball team – 2011 Pan American Games roster
Players
Coaches

Pos.	No.	Name	Age – Date of birth	Height	Club
	4	James, Tavelyn	–
	5	McFarland, Valencia	–
	7	Flores, Christine	–
	6	Johnson, Emilie	–
	8	Stewart, Breanna	–
	9	Luper, Kevi	–
	10	Kastanek, Marissa	–
	11	Sykes, April	–
	12	Redmon, Katelan	23 – Oct 11, 1988	6 ft 1 in (1.85 m)	(United States) Gonzaga Bulldogs
F	13	Standish, Kayla	21 – Nov 19, 1989	6 ft 21 in (2.36 m)	(United States) Gonzaga Bulldogs
PF	14	Evans, Shante	20 – Jul 8, 1991	6 ft 1 in (1.85 m)	(United States) Hofstra Pride
C	15	Warley, Avery	24 – May 17, 1987	6 ft 3 in (1.91 m)	(United States) Liberty Lady Flames

Head coach

- Barry, Adele

Assistant coach(es)

- Gillom, Jennifer
- Ryan, Deborah Ann

== Jamaica ==
The Jamaica women's national basketball team roster for the 2011 Pan American Games.

Jamaica women's national basketball team – 2011 Pan American Games roster
Players
Coaches

Pos.	No.	Name	Age – Date of birth	Height	Club
	4	Dell, Zandria	–
	5	Kelly, Tracey-Ann	–
	6	Gordon, Loretta	–
	7	Farquharson, Melissa	–
	8	Dixon, Sasha	–
	9	Facey, Stacian	–
	10	Brown, Shereel	–
	11	Moodie, Shnell	–
	12	Dias, Nicole	–
	13	Jackson, Simone	–
	14	Lamonth, Ladonna	–

Head coach

- Polack, Richard

Assistant coach(es)

- Smellie, Onecia
- Stephenson, Michael
