= José Monroy =

José Monroy may refer to:

- José Monroy (racing driver) (born 1980), Portuguese racing driver
- José Monroy (footballer) (born 1996), Mexican footballer
