= Morwa =

Morwa may refer to:

- Morwa, Botswana, a village in Botswana
- Morwa, Bihar, a populated place in India
  - Morwa (Vidhan Sabha constituency)
- Morwa, Hormozgan, a village in Iran
- Morwa language, a Niger-Congo language of Nigeria

== See also ==
- Morua
