= José Villegas =

José Villegas may refer to:

- José Villegas (painter) (1844–1921), Spanish painter
- José Villegas (footballer, 1934–2021), Mexican football defender
- José Horacio Villegas (born 1969), Colombian weightlifter
- José Luis Villegas Méndez (born 1976), Mexican politician
- José Villegas (footballer, born 1996), Mexican football defender for Yalmakán
