= Ulises Torres =

Mexican footballer (born 1998)

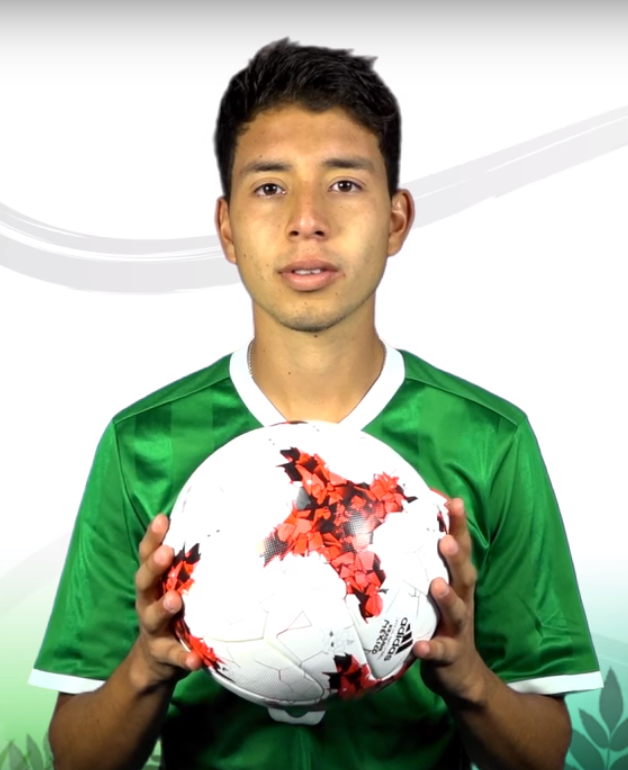
- Torres in 2017

Personal information
- Full name: Ulises Torres Méndez
- Date of birth: 17 February 1998 (age 28)
- Place of birth: Gustavo A. Madero, Mexico City, Mexico
- Height: 1.72 m (5 ft 8 in)
- Position: Midfielder

Team information
- Current team: UdeG
- Number: 5

Senior career*
Years	Team	Apps	(Gls)
2016–2019	América	0	(0)
2019	→ Atlas (loan)	0	(0)
2019–2020	Salamanca	15	(0)
2020–2023	Sonora	84	(4)
2023–	UdeG	87	(3)
2026	→ Puebla (loan)	3	(0)

International career
2015	Mexico U17	6	(0)
2017	Mexico U20	4	(0)
Medal record
Men's football
Representing Mexico
CONCACAF Under-17 Championship
First place	2015 Honduras	Team
- * Club domestic league appearances and goals as of 12 April 2025

Ulises Torres Méndez (born 17 February 1998) is a Mexican professional footballer who plays as a midfielder for Liga de Expansión MX club UdeG. He was included in The Guardian's "Next Generation 2015".

== International career ==
Torres was called up for the 2017 FIFA U-20 World Cup.

== Career statistics ==
=== Club ===
As of 11 February 2021

Club	Season	League			Cup		Continental		Other		Total	
Club	Season	Division	Apps	Goals	Apps	Goals	Apps	Goals	Apps	Goals	Apps	Goals
América	2016–17	Liga MX	0	0	1	0	—		—		1	0
América	2017–18	Liga MX	0	0	—		—		—		0	0
América	2018–19	Liga MX	0	0	—		—		—		0	0
América	Total		0	0	1	0	0	0	0	0	1	0
Atlas (loan)	2018–19	Liga MX	0	0	—		—		—		0	0
Salamanca UDS	2019–20	Segunda División B	15	0	—		—		—		15	0
Sonora	2020–21	Liga de Expansión MX	13	0	—		—		—		13	0
Career total			28	0	1	0	0	0	0	0	29	0

== Honours ==
Mexico U17

- CONCACAF U-17 Championship: 2015
