= Kevin Lara =

Mexican footballer (born 1998)

Personal information
- Full name: Kevin Raúl Lara Herrera
- Date of birth: 18 April 1998 (age 28)
- Place of birth: Culiacán, Sinaloa, Mexico
- Height: 1.69 m (5 ft 7 in)
- Position: Winger

Team information
- Current team: Panathinaikos Chicago

Youth career
- 2012: Chiapas
- 2013–2017: Santos Laguna

Senior career*
Years	Team	Apps	(Gls)
2017–2019	Santos Laguna	0	(0)
2017–2018	→ Tampico Madero (loan)	3	(0)
2018–2019	→ Atlético San Luis (loan)	33	(0)
2019–2020	Tampico Madero	22	(1)
2021–2022	Celaya	54	(0)
2023	UNAM	0	(0)
2023	→ Pumas Tabasco (loan)	9	(0)
2023–2024	Sinaloa	23	(0)
2024–	Panathinaikos Chicago		

International career
2015	Mexico U17	7	(0)
2017	Mexico U20	8	(0)
Medal record
Men's football
Representing Mexico
CONCACAF Under-17 Championship
First place	2015 Honduras	Team
- * Club domestic league appearances and goals as of 9 April 2024

Kevin Raúl Lara Herrera (Note: In this Spanish name, the first or paternal surname is Lara and the second or maternal family name is Herrera.) (born 18 April 1998) is a Mexican professional footballer who plays as a winger for American club Panathinaikos Chicago.

== International career ==
Lara was called up for the 2017 FIFA U-20 World Cup.

== Honours ==
Tampico Madero

- Liga de Expansión MX: Guard1anes 2020

Mexico U17

- CONCACAF U-17 Championship: 2015
