= Eduardo Aguirre (footballer) =

Mexican footballer (born 1998)

Personal information
- Full name: Eduardo Daniel Aguirre Lara
- Date of birth: 3 August 1998 (age 28)
- Place of birth: San Pedro, Coahuila, Mexico
- Height: 1.74 m (5 ft 9 in)
- Position: Forward

Team information
- Current team: Santos Laguna
- Number: 19

Youth career
- 2013–2017: Santos Laguna

Senior career*
Years	Team	Apps	(Gls)
2017–2023	Santos Laguna	108	(20)
2017–2018	→ Tampico Madero (loan)	35	(3)
2023–2026	Atlas	88	(17)
2026–	Santos Laguna	16	(3)

International career^{‡}
2015	Mexico U17	7	(1)
2017	Mexico U20	9	(2)
2018	Mexico U21	8	(9)
2019–2021	Mexico U23	12	(4)
2021–	Mexico	3	(0)
Medal record
Men's football
Representing Mexico
Olympic Games
Bronze medal – third place	2020 Tokyo	Team
Toulon Tournament
Third place	2019 France	Team
Runner-up	2018 France	Team
CONCACAF U-17 Championship
Winner	2015 Honduras	Team
- * Club domestic league appearances and goals as of 21 November 2026 ‡ National team caps and goals as of 31 August 2022

Eduardo Daniel Aguirre Lara (born 3 August 1998), also known as El Mudo, is a Mexican professional footballer who plays as a forward for Liga MX club Santos Laguna.

Aguirre represented Mexico in various youth levels, especially at the 2018 Toulon Tournament, representing the Mexico U21 team, where he was the top scorer with 7 goals.

== Club career ==
Aguirre started his youth career at Santos Laguna in 2013 and broke into the senior team in 2017. He subsequently joined Tampico Madero on loan in 2017, where he would have his senior debut against Zacatepec on 22 July 2017, finishing with a 0–0 draw. On 14 February 2018, he would score his first senior goal against Universidad de Guadalajara in a 4–2 victory.

On 16 February 2020, Aguirre scored his first goal against Tigres UANL in a 2–1 victory, managing to score both goals for his team.

On 14 May 2026, Aguirre returned to Santos Laguna.

== International career ==
=== Youth ===
He was part of the roster that participated in the 2015 FIFA U-17 World Cup in Chile. In the round-of-16 match against Chile, he would score Mexico's third goal at the 69th minute where the team won 4–1.

He was called up for the 2017 FIFA U-20 World Cup.

He was part of the roster that participated at the 2018 Toulon Tournament. He was the top scorer of the tournament with 7 goals.

He was also part of the roster that participated at the 2018 Central American and Caribbean Games. He would score Mexico's 2 goals in the entire tournament, scoring a penalty in their 2–1 loss against Venezuela and giving Mexico the lead against Haiti but eventually tying 1–1, ending up as last in Group B with 1 point.

In May 2019, Aguirre was called up by Jaime Lozano to participate in that year's Toulon Tournament, where Mexico finished third in the tournament.

Ruled out for the 2020 CONCACAF Men's Olympic Qualifying Championship as it was not a FIFA-sanctioned tournament, Aguirre was called up to participate in the 2020 Summer Olympics. He won the bronze medal with the Olympic team.

=== Senior ===
Aguirre received his first call-up to the senior national team by Gerardo Martino, and made his debut on 27 October 2021 in a friendly match against Ecuador, coming in as a substitute in the 65th minute for Santiago Giménez.

== Career statistics ==
=== Club ===
As of match played on 21 November 2026

Club	Season	League			Cup		Continental		Other		Total	
Club	Season	Division	Apps	Goals	Apps	Goals	Apps	Goals	Apps	Goals	Apps	Goals
Santos Laguna	2018–19	Liga MX	5	0	—		2 (Note: Appearances in CONCACAF Champions League)	1	—		7	1
Santos Laguna	2019–20	Liga MX	14	3	5	4	—		—		19	7
Santos Laguna	2020–21	Liga MX	37	8	—		—		—		37	8
Santos Laguna	2021–22	Liga MX	30	5	—		2	0	—		32	5
Santos Laguna	2022–23	Liga MX	22	4	4 (Note: Appearances in Copa Sky por México)	0	—		—		26	4
Santos Laguna	Total		108	20	9	4	4	1	—		121	25
Tampico Madero (loan)	2017–18	Ascenso MX	23	3	4	3	—		—		27	6
Tampico Madero (loan)	2018–19	Ascenso MX	12	0	2	1	—		—		14	1
Tampico Madero (loan)	Total		35	3	6	4	—		—		41	7
Atlas	2023–24	Liga MX	26	7	—		—		3 (Note: Appearances in Leagues Cup)	0	29	7
Atlas	2024–25	Liga MX	32	8	—		—		3	0	35	8
Atlas	2025–26	Liga MX	30	2	—		—		3	0	33	2
Atlas	Total		88	17	—		—		9	0	97	17
Santos Laguna	2026–27	Liga MX	16	3	—		—		3	0	19	3
Career total			247	43	15	8	4	1	12	0	278	52

=== International ===
As of match played on 31 August 2022

National team	Year	Apps	Goals
Mexico	2021	2	0
Mexico	2022	1	0
Total		3	0

== Honours ==
Mexico Youth

- CONCACAF U-17 Championship: 2015
- Olympic Bronze Medal: 2020

Individual

- Toulon Tournament Golden Boot: 2018
- Toulon Tournament Best XI: 2018
