= Alejandro Zamudio =

Mexican footballer (born 1998)

Personal information
- Full name: Alejandro Zamudio Galindo
- Date of birth: 25 February 1998 (age 28)
- Place of birth: Mexico City, Mexico
- Height: 1.75 m (5 ft 9 in)
- Position: Midfielder

Youth career
- 2012–2015: UNAM

Senior career*
Years	Team	Apps	(Gls)
2015–2022	UNAM	8	(0)
2019	→ Puebla (loan)	2	(0)
2020–2022	→ Pumas Tabasco (loan)	39	(1)
Medal record
Men's football
Representing Mexico
CONCACAF Under-17 Championship
First place	2015 Honduras	Team
- * Club domestic league appearances and goals as of 24 July 2022

Alejandro Zamudio Galindo (born 25 February 1998) is a Mexican professional footballer who plays as a midfielder.

== Career ==
On April 9, 2017, he made his debut in Liga MX with Club Universidad Nacional, entering as a substitute in the 1–0 defeat against Deportivo Toluca F.C. on matchday 13 of the Clausura Tournament of that year.

In December 2018, Zamudio was loaned to Club Puebla for the 2019 Clausura Tournament, where he also played in the Mexico Cup, and then returned to Club Universidad Nacional.

== International career ==
He has been called up to various categories of the Mexican national team, representing Mexico in the U-15, U-17 and U-21 categories.

He participated in the 2015 Concacaf U-17 Championship, under the direction of Mario Arteaga, where Mexico became champion.

== Career statistics ==
=== Club ===
As of 14 April 2022

Club	Season	League			Cup		Continental		Other		Total	
Club	Season	Division	Apps	Goals	Apps	Goals	Apps	Goals	Apps	Goals	Apps	Goals
UNAM	2016–17	Liga MX	2	0	–		–		–		2	0
UNAM	2017–18	Liga MX	2	0	1	0	–		–		3	0
UNAM	2019–20	Liga MX	–		1	0	–		–		1	0
Total			4	0	2	0	–		–		6	0
Puebla (loan)	2018–19	Liga MX	–		1	0	–		–		1	0
Pumas Tabasco (loan)	2020–21	Liga de Expansión MX	25	1	—		—		—		25	1
Pumas Tabasco (loan)	2021–22	Liga de Expansión MX	12	0	—		—		—		12	0
Total			37	1	–		–		–		37	1
Career total			41	1	3	0	0	0	0	0	44	1

== Honours ==
Mexico U17

- CONCACAF U-17 Championship: 2015
