= Kevin Magaña =

Mexican footballer (born 1998)

Personal information
- Full name: Kevin Uriel Magaña Araujo
- Date of birth: 2 January 1998 (age 28)
- Place of birth: Guadalajara, Jalisco, Mexico
- Height: 1.72 m (5 ft 8 in)
- Position: Winger

Team information
- Current team: Zacatecas
- Number: 19

Youth career
- 2012–2017: Guadalajara

Senior career*
Years	Team	Apps	(Gls)
2017–2021	Guadalajara	0	(0)
2018–2020	→ Zacatepec (loan)	44	(5)
2020	→ Tapatío (loan)	10	(0)
2021	→ Morelia (loan)	24	(0)
2022	Tlaxcala	9	(1)
2022–	Zacatecas	80	(5)

International career
2014–2015	Mexico U17	7	(2)
2017–2018	Mexico U20	6	(1)
Medal record
Men's football
Representing Mexico
CONCACAF Under-17 Championship
First place	2015 Honduras	Team
- * Club domestic league appearances and goals as of 14 March 2025

Kevin Uriel Magaña Araujo (Note: In this Spanish name, the first or paternal surname is Magaña and the second or maternal family name is Araujo.) (born 2 January 1998) is a Mexican professional footballer who plays as a winger for Liga de Expansión MX club Zacatecas.

== Club career ==
Magaña made his official debut under Argentine coach Matías Almeyda against Tigres UANL in the 2017 Campeon de Campeones Final on 16 July 2017.

== International career ==
Magaña was called up for the 2017 FIFA U-20 World Cup.

== Honours ==
Mexico U17

- CONCACAF U-17 Championship: 2015
