= Diego Cortés =

Mexican footballer (born 1998)

Personal information
- Full name: Diego Cortés Padilla
- Date of birth: 18 June 1998 (age 28)
- Place of birth: Guadalajara, Jalisco, México
- Height: 1.73 m (5 ft 8 in)
- Position: Right-back

Youth career
- 2013–2017: Guadalajara
- 2016: Coras

Senior career*
Years	Team	Apps	(Gls)
2017–2021	Guadalajara	0	(0)
2018–2019	→ Zacatepec (loan)	15	(1)
2019–2020	→ Tudelano (loan)	15	(0)
2020	→ Tapatío (loan)	7	(0)
2021	→ Atlético Morelia (loan)	12	(0)

International career
2015	Mexico U17	7	(2)
2017–2018	Mexico U20	8	(0)
Medal record
Men's football
Representing Mexico
CONCACAF Under-17 Championship
First place	2015 Honduras	Team
- * Club domestic league appearances and goals as of 12 November 2021

Diego Cortés Padilla (born 18 June 1998) is a Mexican professional footballer who plays as a right-back for Atlético Morelia on loan from Guadalajara.

== International career ==
Cortés was called up for the 2017 FIFA U-20 World Cup.

== Honours ==
Mexico U17

- CONCACAF U-17 Championship: 2015
