= José Joaquín Esquivel =

Mexican footballer (born 1998)

Personal information
- Full name: José Joaquín Esquivel Martínez
- Date of birth: 7 January 1998 (age 28)
- Place of birth: Zacatecas, Mexico
- Height: 1.73 m (5 ft 8 in)
- Position: Defensive midfielder

Team information
- Current team: Zacatecas
- Number: 16

Youth career
- 2012–2016: Pachuca

Senior career*
Years	Team	Apps	(Gls)
2016–2019	Pachuca	2	(0)
2014–2015	→ Zacatecas (loan)	13	(0)
2018–2019	→ Lobos BUAP (loan)	32	(0)
2019–2022	Juárez	71	(1)
2022–2023	Necaxa	37	(0)
2023–2026	Mazatlán	34	(1)
2026–	Zacatecas	0	(0)

International career^{‡}
2015–2016	Mexico U17	13	(0)
2017–2018	Mexico U20	3	(0)
2018–2019	Mexico U21	3	(0)
2019–2021	Mexico U23	24	(0)
2021	Mexico	1	(0)
Medal record
Men's football
Representing Mexico
Olympic Games
Bronze medal – third place	2020 Tokyo	Team
Olympic Qualifying Championship
Winner	2020 Mexico
Toulon Tournament
Third place	2019 France	Team
Runner-up	2018 France	Team
Pan American Games
Bronze medal – third place	2019 Lima	Team competition
CONCACAF Under-17 Championship
First place	2015 Honduras	Team
- * Club domestic league appearances and goals as of 28 February 2025 ‡ National team caps and goals as of 6 August 2021

José Joaquín Esquivel Martínez (born 7 January 1998) is a Mexican professional footballer who plays as a defensive midfielder.

== Club career ==
Esquivel debuted for Pachuca against Querétaro on 24 September 2016.

== International career ==
=== Youth ===
Esquivel was called up by Mario Arteaga to compete in the 2015 CONCACAF U-17 Championship, where he wore the captain armband, leading the team to win the tournament. He subsequently participated in the U-17 World Cup to a fourth-place finish.

Esquivel was called up for the 2017 FIFA U-20 World Cup.

Esquivel was included in the under-21 roster that participated in the 2018 Toulon Tournament, where Mexico would finish runners-up.

Esquivel was called up by Jaime Lozano to participate with the under-22 team at the 2019 Toulon Tournament, attaining third place in the tournament. He was later called up for the 2019 Pan American Games, with Mexico winning the third-place match.

Esquivel participated at the 2020 CONCACAF Olympic Qualifying Championship, where Mexico won the competition. He was subsequently called up to participate in the 2020 Summer Olympics. Esquivel won the bronze medal with the Olympic team.

=== Senior ===
On 30 June 2021, Esquivel made his senior national team debut in a friendly match against Panama.

== Career statistics ==
=== Club ===
As of match played 20 September 2023

Club	Season	League			Cup		Continental		Other		Total	
Club	Season	Division	Apps	Goals	Apps	Goals	Apps	Goals	Apps	Goals	Apps	Goals
Pachuca	2016–17	Liga MX	2	0	—		2 (Note: Appearances in CONCACAF Champions League)	2	—		4	2
Pachuca	2017–18	Liga MX	—		8	0	—		—		8	0
Pachuca	Total		2	0	8	0	2	2	—		12	2
Zacatecas (loan)	2014–15	Ascenso MX	2	0	3	0	—		—		5	0
Zacatecas (loan)	2015–16	Ascenso MX	11	0	4	0	—		—		15	0
Zacatecas (loan)	Total		13	0	7	0	—		—		20	0
Lobos BUAP (loan)	2018–19	Liga MX	32	0	—		—		—		32	0
Juárez	2019–20	Liga MX	22	1	—		—		—		22	1
Juárez	2020–21	Liga MX	21	0	—		—		—		21	0
Juárez	2021–22	Liga MX	28	0	—		—		—		28	0
Juárez	Total		71	1	—		—		—		71	1
Necaxa	2022–23	Liga MX	34	0	—		—		—		34	0
Necaxa	2023–24	Liga MX	3	0	—		—		2 (Note: Appearances in Leagues Cup)	0	5	0
Necaxa	Total		37	0	—		—		2	0	39	0
Mazatlán	2023–24	Liga MX	19	1	—		—		—		19	1
Career total			174	2	15	0	2	2	2	0	193	4

=== International ===
As of match played 30 June 2021

National team	Year	Apps	Goals
Mexico	2021	1	0
Total		1	0

== Honours ==
Pachuca

- CONCACAF Champions League: 2016–17

Mexico Youth

- CONCACAF U-17 Championship: 2015
- Pan American Bronze Medal: 2019
- CONCACAF Olympic Qualifying Championship: 2020
- Olympic Bronze Medal: 2020
