= Edwin Lara =

Professional soccer player (born 1999)

Personal information
- Full name: Edwin Lara Barrios
- Date of birth: 8 September 1999 (age 27)
- Place of birth: Berkeley, California, U.S.
- Height: 1.75 m (5 ft 9 in)
- Position: Defender

Youth career
- Alliance SC
- 2013: Tecos Hayward
- 2013: San Jose Earthquakes
- 2014: De Anza Force
- 2014–2018: Pachuca

Senior career*
Years	Team	Apps	(Gls)
2017–2019	Pachuca	0	(0)
2017–2018	Pachuca Premier	7	(0)
2018–2019	→ Club León (loan)	0	(0)
2020	San Diego Loyal	1	(0)
2021	San Diego 1904	8	(0)
Total		16	(0)

International career
2014	United States U16	1	(0)
2014	United States U17	7	(0)
2015	Mexico U17	1	(0)
Medal record
Men's football
Representing Mexico
CONCACAF Under-17 Championship
First place	2015 Honduras	Team
- * Club domestic league appearances and goals

Edwin Lara Barrios (born 8 September 1999) is a former professional soccer player who played as a defender. Born in the United States, he represented the Mexico national under-17 team.

== Club career ==
Born in Berkeley, California, Lara was playing for Alliance SC in early 2013, when he received his first call up to the United States under-14 side. He went on to play for Tecos Hayward before joining the academy of professional club San Jose Earthquakes, however by the time he was called up to the United States under-15 side in January 2014, he had left the club.

After a short spell with the De Anza Force academy, Lara moved to Mexico, signing with Pachuca. In October 2016, he was named by English newspaper The Guardian as one of the best players born in 1999 worldwide. Three years after signing for Pachuca he made his professional debut for the club, playing ninety minutes in a 1–0 Copa MX win against Querétaro in August 2017. He was loaned to fellow Liga MX side Club León for the 2018–19 season, but only managed one appearance - scoring an own goal in a 1–1 Copa MX draw with Cruz Azul in February 2019.

== International career ==
Lara was eligible to represent either the United States or Mexico, having been born in California to Mexican parents. Lara originally represented the United States U15s and United States U17s before joining the Mexico U17s. He represented Mexico at the 2015 FIFA U-17 World Cup. In 2019, Lara filed a one-time switch of association with FIFA to leave Mexico's program and join the United States U20s at their first camp of the year, thus confirming his international future with the US Men.

== Career statistics ==
=== Club ===
Appearances and goals by club, season and competition
Club	Season	League			Cup		Other		Total	
Club	Season	Division	Apps	Goals	Apps	Goals	Apps	Goals	Apps	Goals
Pachuca	2017–18	Liga MX	0	0	1 (Note: Appearances in the Copa MX)	0	0	0	1	0
Pachuca	2018–19	Liga MX	0	0	0	0	0	0	0	0
Pachuca	Total		0	0	1	0	0	0	1	0
Pachuca Premier	2017–18	Liga Premier - Serie A	7	0	–		0	0	7	0
Club León (loan)	2018–19	Liga MX	0	0	1	0	0	0	1	0
San Diego Loyal	2020	USL Championship	1	0	0	0	0	0	1	0
San Diego 1904	2020–21	NISA	8	0	0	0	0	0	8	0
Career total			16	0	2	0	0	0	18	0

== Honours ==
Mexico U17

- CONCACAF U-17 Championship: 2015
