= Morua =

Morua is a surname. Notable people with the surname include:

- Arturo Morua (born 1978), Mexican boxer
- Edson Morúa (born 1990), Mexican footballer

== See also ==
- Moruya, New South Wales
