= Duwayne Ewart =

Canadian soccer player (born 1998)

Personal information
- Full name: Duwayne Oswald Ewart
- Date of birth: 22 March 1998 (age 28)
- Place of birth: Scarborough, Ontario, Canada
- Height: 6 ft 1 in (1.85 m)
- Position: Forward

Youth career
- 2006-?: Scarborough Blizzard
- 2013: North Scarborough SC
- Vancouver Whitecaps FC Residency
- Ajax SC
- Vaughan SC

Senior career*
Years	Team	Apps	(Gls)
2015	Vaughan Azzurri		
2016	Pittsburgh Riverhounds	9	(0)
2017	Durham United FA	10	(1)
2018	Unionville Milliken SC	2	(0)
2019	ProStars FC	4	(1)

International career
2015	Canada U17	6	(3)
2016–2018	Canada U20	3	(0)
- * Club domestic league appearances and goals as of September 21, 2021

Duwayne Oswald Ewart (born March 22, 1998) is a Canadian soccer player who last played for ProStars FC in League1 Ontario. He plays as a forward.

== Career ==
=== Youth ===
Ewart played youth soccer in Scarborough, before moving on to the Vancouver Whitecaps FC Academy. He later moved on to Vaughan SC, spending some time with their senior team in League1 Ontario club in 2015, where he scored a goal against Sigma FC.

=== Pittsburgh Riverhounds ===
Ewart signed a professional contract with United Soccer League side Pittsburgh Riverhounds on March 27, 2016. Ewart made his professional debut on May 21, 2016 in a 2–1 victory over Toronto FC II.

== International career ==
He was named to the U15 national team for the 2013 Copa de México de Naciones.

Ewart played for the Canadian U-17 team at the 2015 CONCACAF U-17 Championship, where he was the team's top goalscorer.

In August 2016, Ewart was called up to the U-20 team for a pair of friendlies against Costa Rica

He also qualifies to play for Jamaica as his father was born in Clarendon and his mother in Kingston.
