= Arturo Avilés (footballer, born 1961) =

Mexican footballer and manager (1961–2019)

Personal information
- Full name: Arturo Avilés Sosa
- Date of birth: 26 April 1961
- Place of birth: Mexico City, Mexico
- Date of death: 4 March 2019 (aged 57)
- Place of death: Veracruz, Veracruz, Mexico
- Height: 1.77 m (5 ft 9 1/2 in)
- Position: Defender

Senior career*
Years	Team	Apps	(Gls)
1979	Tecos UAG	1	(1)
1981–1984	Atlante	20	(1)
1984–1985	Ángeles de Puebla	12	(0)
1985–1986	Atlante		
1986–1987	Chetumal		

Managerial career
- 1998: Necaxa (Assistant)
- 2000–2001: BUAP
- 2002–2003: Acapulco
- 2005: Pachuca Juniors (Assistant)
- 2005–2006: Indios de Ciudad Juárez (Assistant)
- 2007–2008: Tiburones Rojos de Boca del Río
- 2008: Tiburones Rojos de Veracruz (Interim)
- 2009: Tiburones Rojos de Boca del Río
- 2009: Tiburones Rojos de Córdoba
- 2015: Alto Rendimiento Tuzo
- 2015–2016: Tlaxcala (Assistant)
- 2017–2018: Veracruz Premier
- * Club domestic league appearances and goals

Arturo Avilés Sosa (26 April 1961 – 4 March 2019) was a Mexican football manager and former player.

== Personal life ==
Avilés' son, also named Arturo, is also a professional footballer.

Arturo Avilés Sosa died in Veracruz, Veracruz on 4 March 2019, at the age of 57.
