= Heriberto Olvera =

Mexican footballer (born 1990)

Personal information
- Full name: Heriberto Olvera Hernández
- Date of birth: 13 May 1990 (age 36)
- Place of birth: Pachuca de Soto, Hidalgo, Mexico
- Height: 1.75 m (5 ft 9 in)
- Position: Defender

Team information
- Current team: Pachuca U21 (Assistant)

Youth career
- 2007–2015: Pachuca
- 2009–2010: Universidad del Fútbol
- 2010–2011: Tampico Madero
- 2011–2012: Titanes de Tulancingo
- 2012–2013: Murciélagos
- 2013: Linces de Tlaxcala

Senior career*
| Years | Team | Apps | (Gls) |
| 2008–2015 | Pachuca | 11 | (0) |
| 2016–2020 | Zacatecas | 66 | (4) |
| 2017–2018 | → BUAP (loan) | 24 | (0) |
| 2018 | → Atlas (loan) | 3 | (0) |
| 2020 | Atlético Jalisco | 0 | (0) |
| 2021–2022 | Antigua | 19 | (0) |

Managerial career
- 2026–: Pachuca U21 (Assistant)
- * Club domestic league appearances and goals as of 24 January 2020

Heriberto Olvera Hernández (born 13 May 1990) is a Mexican professional footballer who is a free agent.
