= Akeem Chambers =

Jamaican footballer (born 1998)

Personal information
- Date of birth: 16 June 1998 (age 28)
- Place of birth: Kingston, Jamaica
- Position: Goalkeeper

Team information
- Current team: Waterhouse
- Number: 1

Senior career*
Years	Team	Apps	(Gls)
2015-	Waterhouse	47	(0)

International career^{‡}
2019-	Jamaica	2	(0)
- * Club domestic league appearances and goals as of May 26, 2020 ‡ National team caps and goals as of May 26, 2020

Akeem Chambers (born 16 June 1998) is a Jamaican footballer who plays for National Premier League side Waterhouse and the Jamaica national team.

== Career ==
=== Club ===
Chambers plays for Waterhouse FC in Jamaica and also studies at Mico Teachers College

=== International ===
Chambers made his senior debut for Jamaica against Guyana in their final 2019-20 CONCACAF Nations League match on 19 November 2019.

== Personal life ==
In April 2020, Chambers' home in Kingston was destroyed in a fire.
