= José Gurrola =

Mexican footballer (born 1998)

Personal information
- Full name: José Jesús Gurrola Castro
- Date of birth: 15 April 1998 (age 28)
- Place of birth: Hermosillo, Sonora, Mexico
- Height: 1.77 m (5 ft 10 in)
- Position: Winger

Youth career
- 2013–2018: Guadalajara

Senior career*
Years	Team	Apps	(Gls)
2018–2019	Guadalajara	1	(0)
2018–2019	→ Atlético San Luis (loan)	2	(1)
2019	→ Juárez (loan)	0	(0)
2020	CAFESSA Jalisco	4	(1)
2020	Mazorqueros	10	(7)
2021	Querétaro	11	(1)
2021–2023	Sonora	58	(1)
2023–2024	Atlético La Paz	21	(2)

International career
2015	Mexico U17	7	(1)
Medal record
Men's football
Representing Mexico
CONCACAF Under-17 Championship
First place	2015 Honduras	Team
- * Club domestic league appearances and goals as of 21 October 2022

José Jesús Gurrola Castro (Note: In this Spanish name, the first or paternal surname is Gurrola and the second or maternal family name is Castro.) (born 15 April 1998) is a Mexican professional footballer who plays as a winger for Liga de Expansión MX club Sonora.

== Honours ==
Mexico U17

- CONCACAF U-17 Championship: 2015
