= Jaylon Hadden =

Costa Rican football player (born 1998)

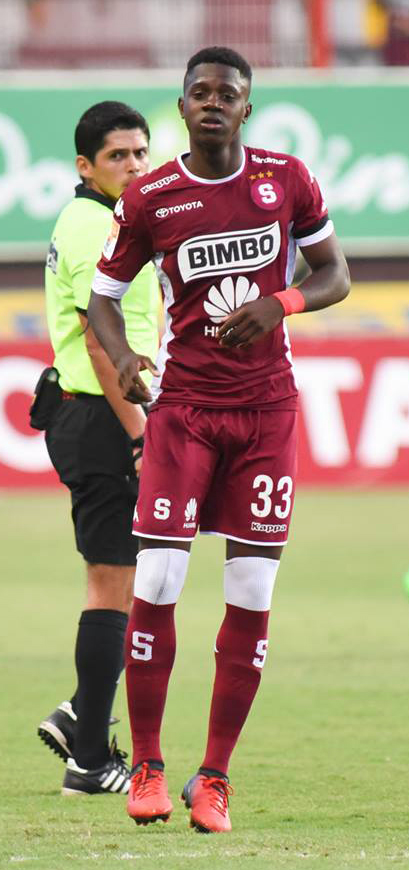
- Jaylon Hadden playing for Saprissa on 19 March 2017 against Herediano

Personal information
- Full name: Jaylon Jahi Hadden Scarlett
- Date of birth: 9 April 1998 (age 28)
- Place of birth: Limón, Costa Rica
- Height: 1.76 m (5 ft 9 in)
- Position: Midfielder

Team information
- Current team: A.D. San Carlos
- Number: 33

Youth career
- –2016: Deportivo Saprissa

Senior career*
Years	Team	Apps	(Gls)
2017–2023	Deportivo Saprissa	128	(1)
2021	→ Sporting (loan)	15	(1)
2023–2025	Herediano	7	(0)
2024	→ Sporting (loan)	32	(1)
2025-	San Carlos	12	(0)

International career^{‡}
2018–	Costa Rica	3	(0)
- * Club domestic league appearances and goals as of 7 May 2025 ‡ National team caps and goals as of 22 August 2021

Jaylon Jahi Hadden Scarlett (born 9 April 1998) is a Costa Rican professional footballer who plays as a midfielder for Liga FPD club A.D. San Carlos.

== Club career ==
From Limón, Hadden plays a defensive central midfielder but also capable of playing in central defence. Hadden played 140 games in all competitions during his time with Deportivo Saprissa, between his debut in March 2017 and 2023. He scored his first professional goal while on loan at Sporting, but scored his first goal for Deportivo Saprissa in the 97th minute and of a derby match against Alajuelense in February 2022, having returned to his parent club in July 2021. A two-time Liga FPD with Saprissa, in May 2023, he signed for Herediano. In June 2025, he signed for A.D. San Carlos ahead of the 2025 Apertura tournament.

== International career ==
He made his debut for the Costa Rica national team on 12 October 2018, against Mexico at the Estadio León.
