= Arturo Avilés (footballer, born 1994) =

Mexican footballer

Personal information
- Full name: Arturo Avilés Salazar
- Date of birth: 23 June 1994 (age 32)
- Place of birth: Mexico City, Mexico
- Height: 1.72 m (5 ft 8 in)
- Position: Defender

Youth career
- Atlante

Senior career*
Years	Team	Apps	(Gls)
2013–2017	Atlante	2	(0)
2016–2017	→ Yalmakán (loan)	22	(8)
2018	Veracruz	0	(0)
2018	Cocodrilos de Tabasco	8	(1)
2019	Yalmakán	14	(2)
- * Club domestic league appearances and goals

Arturo Avilés Salazar (born 23 June 1994) is a Mexican former professional footballer.

== Personal life ==
Avilés' father, also named Arturo, is a football manager and former footballer.
