= Andy Reyes =

Costa Rican footballer (born 1999)

Personal information
- Full name: Andy Josué Reyes Vado
- Date of birth: 6 April 1999 (age 27)
- Place of birth: San Ramón, Costa Rica
- Height: 1.77 m (5 ft 10 in)
- Position: Forward

Team information
- Current team: Fútbol Consultants

Youth career
- –2016: Carmelita
- 2017–2018: Pachuca

Senior career*
Years	Team	Apps	(Gls)
2016–2017	Carmelita	39	(7)
2018–2021	Juniors OÖ	29	(7)
2020	→ Austria Lustenau (loan)	8	(0)
2020–2021	→ Cartaginés (loan)	54	(4)
2022	Deportivo Saprissa	27	(3)
2023	Guadalupe	21	(9)
2023	Municipal Grecia	12	(0)
2024	Fútbol Consultants		
2024	Santa Ana	17	(2)
2025–	Fútbol Consultants		

International career^{‡}
2015	Costa Rica U15	1	(0)
2015	Costa Rica U17	5	(2)
2017–2018	Costa Rica U20	9	(2)
- * Club domestic league appearances and goals as of 10 November 2024 ‡ National team caps and goals as of 17 November 2018

Andy Josué Reyes Vado (born 6 April 1999) is a Costa Rican footballer who plays for Fútbol Consultants.

== Career ==
Reyes started his senior career with Carmelita. In 2018, he signed for Juniors OÖ in the Austrian Football Second League. After that, he played for SC Austria Lustenau.

On 3 August 2020 he moved back to Costa Rica and joined Cartaginés on loan until the end of 2021.

On 29 December 2021, Reyes signed a two-year contract with Deportivo Saprissa.

He signed for Guadalupe in December 2022.
