= Edson Morúa =

Mexican footballer (born 1990)

Edson Francisco Enrique Arturo Morúa Garza (born August 8, 1990, in Saltillo, Coahuila) is a professional Mexican footballer who currently plays for Murciélagos F.C. in the Liga Premier de México.

== Career ==
Born in Saltillo, Morúa began his professional football career playing as a midfielder for Club Santos Laguna "A" in the Primera División A during 2008. He would eventually make a late substitute's appearance for Santos Laguna's first team in the 2011–12 CONCACAF Champions League group stage against Colorado Rapids. He has also played for Real Saltillo Soccer, Unión de Curtidores and Murciélagos.
