= Ronaldo Córdoba =

Panamanian footballer (born 1998)

Personal information
- Full name: Ronaldo Nazario Córdoba Welch
- Date of birth: 11 February 1998 (age 28)
- Place of birth: Panama
- Height: 1.76 m (5 ft 9 in)
- Position: Forward

Team information
- Current team: Tauro

Youth career
- Chepo

Senior career*
Years	Team	Apps	(Gls)
2015–2016	Chepo	24	(1)
2016	Santa Gema	11	(3)
2016–2017	Tauro	21	(4)
2018–2019	Sporting San Miguelito	16	(5)
2019	Costa del Este	3	(0)
2019	Sporting San Miguelito	2	(0)

International career^{‡}
2016–	Panama	4	(0)
- * Club domestic league appearances and goals as of 28 September 2016 ‡ National team caps and goals as of 12 October 2017

Ronaldo Nazario Córdoba Welch (born 11 February 1998) is a Panamanian professional football forward who last played for Sporting San Miguelito in the Liga Panameña.

== Career ==
Córdoba made his debut for Chepo on 27 July 2015 in a 5–2 Liga Panameña home loss to San Miguelito.

He made his international debut for Panama on 18 February 2016 in a friendly match against El Salvador.
