= José Monroy (footballer) =

Mexican footballer (born 1996)

Personal information
- Full name: José Andrés Monroy Saldaña
- Date of birth: 10 March 1996 (age 30)
- Place of birth: Guadalajara, Jalisco, Mexico
- Height: 1.72 m (5 ft 8 in)
- Position: Defender

Team information
- Current team: Club Atlas
- Number: 13

Senior career*
Years	Team	Apps	(Gls)
2018–	Club Atlas	1	(0)
- * Club domestic league appearances and goals as of January 19, 2017

José Andrés Monroy Saldaña (born 10 March 1996) is a Mexican footballer who plays as a defender for Club Atlas.
