= José Villegas (footballer, born 1996) =

Mexican footballer (born 1996)

Personal information
- Full name: José Villegas Cruz
- Date of birth: 6 April 1996 (age 30)
- Place of birth: Aguascalientes City, Aguascalientes, Mexico
- Height: 1.81 m (5 ft 11 in)
- Position: Defender

Team information
- Current team: Pachuca U-21 (Assistant)

Youth career
- 2011–2016: Pachuca

Senior career*
Years	Team	Apps	(Gls)
2016–2018	Pachuca	1	(0)
2016	→ Tlaxcala (loan)	10	(0)
2018–2020	Tlaxcala	39	(4)
2020–2021	Mazorqueros	21	(2)
2022–2023	Yalmakán	26	(0)

Managerial career
- 2024–: Pachuca Reserves and Academy
- * Club domestic league appearances and goals as of 8 May 2023 ‡ National team caps and goals as of 25 March 2016

José Villegas Cruz (born April 6, 1996) is a former Mexican professional footballer who last played as a defender for Yalmakán of Liga Premier de México.
