= Wisdom Quaye =

Honduran footballer (born 1998)

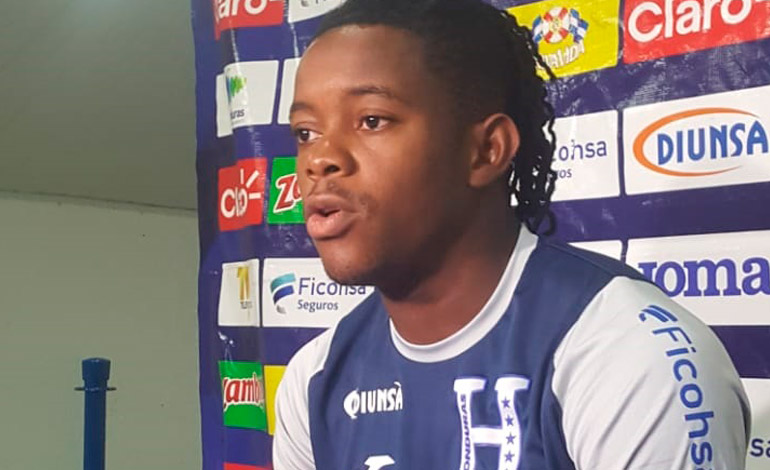

Personal information
- Full name: Wisdom Niiayitey Quaye July
- Date of birth: 8 April 1998 (age 28)
- Place of birth: La Ceiba, Honduras
- Height: 1.71 m (5 ft 7 in)
- Position: Defender

Team information
- Current team: Real España
- Number: 29

Youth career
- Vida

Senior career*
Years	Team	Apps	(Gls)
2015–2021	Vida	51	(2)
2021–	Real España	42	(0)
2024–2025	→ Victoria (loan)	16	(0)

International career^{‡}
2015	Honduras U17	2	(0)
2022–	Honduras	3	(0)
- * Club domestic league appearances and goals as of 18 May 2025 ‡ National team caps and goals as of 02:26, 3 February 2022 (UTC)

Wisdom Niiayitey Quaye July (born 8 April 1998) is a Honduran professional footballer who plays as a defender for Real España and the Honduras national team.

== Early life ==
Quaye was born on 8 April 1998. Born in La Ceiba, Honduras, he is a native of Puerto Castilla, Honduras and is of Ghanaian descent through his father.

== Club career ==
As a youth player, Quaye joined the youth academy of Vida and was promoted to the club's seniior team in 2015, where he made fifty-one league appearances and scored two goals.

In 2021, he signed for Real España. Subsequently, he was sent on loan to Victoria in 2024, where he made sixteen league appearances and scored zero goals.

== International career ==
Quaye is a Honduras international. During the summer of 2015, he played for the Honduras national under-17 football team at the 2015 FIFA U-17 World Cup.
