= Mario Arteaga =

Mexican footballer (born 1970)

Personal information
- Full name: Mario Alberto Arteaga Herrera
- Date of birth: 29 November 1970 (age 55)
- Place of birth: Guadalajara, Jalisco, Mexico
- Position: Forward

Senior career*
Years	Team	Apps	(Gls)
1990–1993	Guadalajara	59	(14)
1993–1995	Club León	12	(3)
1995–1997	UNAM Pumas	12	(1)
1997–1999	Chivas Tijuana	55	(10)
1999–2001	Nacional Tijuana	63	(12)
2001–2002	Gallos de Aguascalientes	22	(3)

International career
1992	Mexico U23		

Managerial career
- 2003–2004: Dorados de Sinaloa
- 2005: Club León (Assistant)
- 2005: Veracruz (Assistant)
- 2006: Club León (Assistant)
- 2008–2009: Dorados de Sinaloa (Assistant)
- 2014–2018: Mexico U17
- 2018: Mexico U21
- 2018–2019: Mexico U18
- 2023–2024: Mexico U23 (Assistant)
- * Club domestic league appearances and goals

Mario Alberto Arteaga Herrera (born 29 November 1970) is a Mexican former professional footballer who played as a forward.

== Playing career ==
=== Club ===
He played as forward during his career, beginning with Chivas in the 1990–91 season. During the following year, Arteaga led Chivas with 9 goals as the club reached the playoff phase. He struggled to recapture that form, however, scoring only 5 goals the next year and 3 goals with León during the 1993–94 season as his top-flight career began to wind down.

=== International ===
Arteaga was also a member of the Mexico national under-23 football team competing at the 1992 Summer Olympics in Barcelona, Spain. He appeared twice in the tournament, coming off the bench against Australia and playing from the start against Ghana.

== Managerial statistics ==
=== Managerial statistics ===
As of 8 November 2015

Team	Nat	From	To	Record							
Team	Nat	From	To	G	W	D	L	GF	GA	GD	Win %
Mexico U-17	(Mexico)	July 2014	Present	23	12	5	6	56	25	+31	52.17

== Honours ==
=== Manager ===
- CONCACAF U-17 Championship 2015 Gold Medal
- FIFA U-17 World Cup 2015 Fourth Place
