= List of Mexican football transfers winter 2017–18 =

This is a list of Mexican football transfers during the 2017–18 winter transfer window, grouped by club. It includes football transfers related to clubs from the Liga Bancomer MX and Ascenso MX.

== Liga Bancomer MX ==
=== América ===
In: Note: Flags indicate national team as defined under FIFA eligibility rules; some limited exceptions apply. Players may hold more than one non-FIFA nationality.

No.	Pos.	Nation	Player
6	DF	ARG	Emanuel Aguilera (from Tijuana)
11	MF	COL	Andrés Ibargüen (from (Argentina) Racing)
14	MF	USA	Joe Corona (on loan from Tijuana)
20	FW	FRA	Jérémy Ménez (from (Turkey) Antalyaspor)
21	FW	MEX	Henry Martín (from Tijuana)
24	FW	MEX	Oribe Peralta (re-signed)

Out: Note: Flags indicate national team as defined under FIFA eligibility rules; some limited exceptions apply. Players may hold more than one non-FIFA nationality.

No.	Pos.	Nation	Player
3	DF	MEX	Gil Burón (on loan to Murciélagos)
6	DF	PAR	Miguel Samudio (to Querétaro)
9	FW	ARG	Silvio Romero (to (Argentina) Independiente)
12	DF	PAR	Pablo Aguilar (to Tijuana)
20	MF	MEX	Manuel Pérez (on loan to BUAP)
25	MF	PAR	Cristhian Paredes (on loan to (United States) Portland Timbers)
28	MF	CRC	Gerson Torres (loan return to (Costa Rica) Herediano)
29	MF	MEX	Carlos Rosel (on loan to Oaxaca)
31	FW	COL	Darwin Quintero (to (United States) Minnesota United)
33	DF	MEX	Luis Amador (on loan to Pacific)
35	GK	MEX	Jonathan León (on loan to Atlético Reynosa)
—	DF	MEX	Jonathan Sánchez (on loan to Venados, previously on loan at Sonora)
—	MF	ARG	Cristian Pellerano (on loan to (Ecuador) Independiente del Valle, previously on loan at Veracruz)
—	MF	MEX	Francisco Rivera (on loan to Zacatecas, previously on loan at Oaxaca)
—	MF	MEX	David Salazar (on loan to Atlante)
—	FW	MEX	Martín Zúñiga (re-loan to Oaxaca)

=== Atlas ===
In: Note: Flags indicate national team as defined under FIFA eligibility rules; some limited exceptions apply. Players may hold more than one non-FIFA nationality.

No.	Pos.	Nation	Player
11	MF	PER	Alexi Gómez (on loan from (Peru) Universitario)
20	MF	GHA	Clifford Aboagye (from (Spain) Granada, previously on loan)
22	FW	CHI	Ángelo Henríquez (from (Croatia) Dinamo Zagreb)
23	GK	CHI	Cristopher Toselli (on loan from (Chile) Universidad Católica)
32	DF	PER	Roberto Villamarín (from (Peru) UTC)
95	DF	MEX	Diego Ortega (loan return from Inter Playa del Carmen)

Out: Note: Flags indicate national team as defined under FIFA eligibility rules; some limited exceptions apply. Players may hold more than one non-FIFA nationality.

No.	Pos.	Nation	Player
8	MF	MEX	Uvaldo Luna (loan return to UANL)
9	FW	ECU	Fidel Martínez (on loan to (Uruguay) Peñarol)
10	FW	MEX	Jahir Barraza (on loan to Atlético San Luis)
11	FW	ARG	Matías Alustiza (on loan to UNAM)
13	MF	MEX	Javier Salas (to Cruz Azul)
16	DF	ARG	Facundo Erpen (on loan to BUAP)
22	DF	MEX	Diego Cruz (on loan to Puebla)
23	MF	URU	Christian Tabó (on loan to Puebla)
27	DF	MEX	José Madueña (loan return to Tijuana)
93	FW	MEX	Brayan Villalobos (on loan to Tapachula)
—	DF	MEX	Enrique Pérez (on loan to Tapachula, previously on loan at Morelia)
—	DF	MEX	Fernando Ruíz (on loan to Puebla, previously on loan at Juárez)
—	MF	MEX	Ricardo Bocanegra (on loan to Murciélagos, previously on loan at (Nicaragua) Real Estelí)
—	MF	MEX	Rodolfo Vilchis (re-loan to Morelia)
—	FW	PAR	Luis Nery Caballero (to (Paraguay) Guaraní, previously on loan at (Paraguay) Nacional Asunción)
—	FW	COL	Jefferson Duque (on loan to Morelia, previously on loan at (Colombia) Deportivo Cali)
—	FW	MEX	Juan de Dios Hernández (on loan to Atlante)
—	FW	MEX	Flavio Santos (unattached, previously on loan at Sinaloa)

=== BUAP ===
In: Note: Flags indicate national team as defined under FIFA eligibility rules; some limited exceptions apply. Players may hold more than one non-FIFA nationality.

No.	Pos.	Nation	Player
4	DF	ARG	Facundo Erpen (on loan from Atlas)
8	MF	ECU	Jordan Sierra (on loan from UANL)
10	MF	ECU	Gabriel Cortez (from (Ecuador) Independiente del Valle)
14	FW	PER	Irven Ávila (from (Peru) Sporting Cristal)
15	FW	MEX	Luis Márquez (on loan from Guadalajara, previously on loan at Zacatepec)
19	FW	MEX	Jerónimo Amione (on loan from Puebla)
23	MF	MEX	Manuel Pérez (on loan from América)
30	FW	COL	Arley Rodríguez (on loan from UANL)
34	DF	MEX	Irving Zurita (on loan from Atlante)

Out: Note: Flags indicate national team as defined under FIFA eligibility rules; some limited exceptions apply. Players may hold more than one non-FIFA nationality.

No.	Pos.	Nation	Player
4	DF	MEX	Richard Okunorobo (on loan to Sinaloa)
8	MF	MEX	Jorge Ibarra (on loan to Sinaloa)
13	MF	MEX	Omar Tejeda (on loan to (Peru) Melgar)
23	FW	ARG	Emanuel Herrera (loan return to (Ecuador) Emelec)
32	MF	PAR	Jonathan Fabbro (released)
—	GK	MEX	Antonio Iriarte (unattached, previously on loan at Juárez)

=== Cruz Azul ===
In: Note: Flags indicate national team as defined under FIFA eligibility rules; some limited exceptions apply. Players may hold more than one non-FIFA nationality.

No.	Pos.	Nation	Player
8	MF	MEX	Javier Salas (from Atlas)
10	MF	ARG	Walter Montoya (from (Spain) Sevilla)
11	FW	MEX	Carlos Fierro (from Guadalajara)
18	MF	MEX	Carlos Peña (on loan from (Scotland) Rangers)
27	DF	MEX	José Madueña (from Tijuana, previously on loan at Atlas)

Out: Note: Flags indicate national team as defined under FIFA eligibility rules; some limited exceptions apply. Players may hold more than one non-FIFA nationality.

No.	Pos.	Nation	Player
2	DF	MEX	Omar Mendoza (on loan to Tijuana)
8	MF	ARG	Gabriel Peñalba (to (Spain) Las Palmas)
10	MF	MEX	Christian Giménez (on loan to Pachuca)
18	MF	ARG	Alejandro Faurlín (to (Spain) Mallorca)
—	DF	PAR	Silvio Borjas (to (Ecuador) Técnico Universitario, previously on loan at (Paraguay) Capiatá)
—	DF	MEX	Jesús García (on loan to Murciélagos, previously on loan at Toluca)
—	DF	ARG	Emanuel Loeschbor (re-loan to Morelia)
—	FW	MEX	Sinecio González (unattached, previously on loan at UAEM)
—	FW	MEX	Jesús Lara (on loan to Veracruz, previously on loan at Sonora)

=== Guadalajara ===
In: Note: Flags indicate national team as defined under FIFA eligibility rules; some limited exceptions apply. Players may hold more than one non-FIFA nationality.

No.	Pos.	Nation	Player
1	GK	MEX	José Antonio Rodríguez (loan return from Tijuana)
3	DF	MEX	Carlos Salcido (re-signed)
13	MF	MEX	Gael Sandoval (from Santos Laguna)
29	FW	MEX	Ronaldo Cisneros (from Santos Laguna)
30	GK	MEX	Rodolfo Cota (re-loan from Pachuca)
31	MF	MEX	Alan Cervantes (loan return from León)

Out: Note: Flags indicate national team as defined under FIFA eligibility rules; some limited exceptions apply. Players may hold more than one non-FIFA nationality.

No.	Pos.	Nation	Player
18	MF	MEX	Ángel López (on loan to Zacatepec)
21	FW	MEX	Carlos Fierro (to Cruz Azul)
23	MF	MEX	José Juan Vázquez (to Santos Laguna)
84	DF	MEX	Andrés Ramírez (on loan to Zacatepec)
99	MF	MEX	Kevin Magaña (on loan fto Zacatepec)
283	DF	MEX	Diego Cortés (on loan to Zacatepec)
—	GK	MEX	Víctor Hugo Hernández (re-loan to Zacatepec)
—	DF	MEX	Kristian Álvarez (on loan to UdeG, previously on loan at Veracruz)
—	DF	MEX	Sergio Flores (on loan to Zacatecas, previously on loan at Zacatepec)
—	DF	MEX	Arturo Ledesma (re-loan to Tampico Madero)
—	DF	MEX	Carlos Lugo (on loan to La Piedad, previously on loan at Zacatepec)
—	DF	MEX	Néstor Vidrio (on loan to UdeG)
—	DF	MEX	Ulises Zurita (on loan to Venados, previously on loan at Atlético San Luis)
—	MF	MEX	Jorge Enríquez (on loan to Puebla, previously on loan at Santos Laguna)
—	MF	MEX	Fernando González (on loan to Necaxa, previously on loan at Zacatepec)
—	MF	MEX	Giovani Hernández (on loan to Zacatepec, previously on loan at Veracruz)
—	MF	MEX	Sergio Nápoles (on loan to Oaxaca)
—	MF	MEX	David Toledo (on loan to Oaxaca, previously on loan at Puebla)
—	FW	MEX	William Guzmán (on loan to Murciélagos, previously on loan at Zacatepec)
—	FW	MEX	Luis Márquez (on loan to BUAP, previously on loan at Zacatepec)
—	FW	MEX	Daniel Ríos (on loan to (United States) North Carolina, previously on loan at Zacatepec)

=== León ===
In: Note: Flags indicate national team as defined under FIFA eligibility rules; some limited exceptions apply. Players may hold more than one non-FIFA nationality.

No.	Pos.	Nation	Player
15	MF	ARG	Emanuel Cecchini (on loan from (Spain) Málaga)
20	MF	USA	Landon Donovan (from (United States) LA Galaxy)
33	FW	JAM	Giles Barnes (from (United States) Orlando City)

Out: Note: Flags indicate national team as defined under FIFA eligibility rules; some limited exceptions apply. Players may hold more than one non-FIFA nationality.

No.	Pos.	Nation	Player
2	DF	ARG	Diego Novaretti (on loan to Querétaro)
14	FW	ARG	Jorge Pereyra (loan return to (Malaysia) Johor Darul Ta'zim)
18	MF	MEX	Alan Cervantes (loan return to Guadalajara)
20	MF	MEX	Leonel López (on loan to Toluca)
31	MF	COL	Harold Isaza (unattached)
—	DF	MEX	Fernando Battaglia (on loan to (Costa Rica) Carmelita, previously on loan at Cancún)
—	DF	MEX	Arturo Ortiz (on loan to UAT, previously on loan at Zacatecas)
—	DF	MEX	Juan Carlos Rojas (unattached, previously on loan at Juárez)
—	MF	MEX	David Alcántar (unattached, previously on loan at UdeG)
—	MF	MEX	Mauricio Castañeda (on loan to Murciélagos, previously on loan at (Nicaragua) Real Madriz)
—	MF	ECU	Jonathan González (unattached, previously on loan at (Ecuador) LDU Quito)
—	MF	COL	Eisner Loboa (unattached, previously on loan at (Colombia) América de Cali)
—	FW	MEX	Aldo Magaña (on loan to Celaya, previously on loan at (Costa Rica) Guadalupe)
—	FW	COL	Yamilson Rivera (on loan to (Colombia) América de Cali, previously on loan at (Colombia) Santa Fe)

=== Monterrey ===
In: Note: Flags indicate national team as defined under FIFA eligibility rules; some limited exceptions apply. Players may hold more than one non-FIFA nationality.

No.	Pos.	Nation	Player
9	FW	ARG	Lucas Albertengo (on loan from (Argentina) Independiente)
10	MF	URU	Jonathan Urretaviscaya (from Pachuca)
30	FW	MEX	Julio Cruz (loan return from (Costa Rica) Herediano)
32	DF	MEX	Efraín Velarde (loan return from Toluca)
87	MF	MEX	Luis Amaya (on loan from UAT)
98	FW	MEX	Marcelo Gracia (loan return from Atlante)

Out: Note: Flags indicate national team as defined under FIFA eligibility rules; some limited exceptions apply. Players may hold more than one non-FIFA nationality.

No.	Pos.	Nation	Player
2	MF	USA	Edgar Castillo (on loan to (United States) Colorado Rapids)
5	DF	MEX	Luis Fuentes (loan return to UNAM)
6	DF	MEX	Efraín Juárez (to (Canada) Vancouver Whitecaps)
19	MF	ARG	Neri Cardozo (to (Argentina) Racing)
29	FW	MEX	Marco Bueno (loan return to Pachuca)
94	FW	USA	Alonso Hernández (on loan to Atlético Reynosa)
98	DF	MEX	Bernardo Hernández (on loan to Pacific)
289	FW	MEX	Ángel Lopez (on loan to Veracruz)
299	MF	MEX	André Aguilar (on loan to Murciélagos)
—	DF	MEX	Dárvin Chávez (to (Finland) Jaro)
—	DF	MEX	Severo Meza (unattached, previously on loan at Cafetaleros de Tapachula)
—	DF	MEX	Hiram Mier (to Querétaro, previously on loan)
—	DF	MEX	Héctor Morales (unattached, previously on loan at UAT)
—	DF	MEX	David Stringel (unattached, previously on loan at UAEM)
—	FW	MEX	Othoniel Arce (to (Guatemala) Suchitepéquez, previously on loan at Necaxa)
—	FW	MEX	Omar Arellano (on loan to (Costa Rica) Herediano)
—	FW	HON	Alberth Elis (to (United States) Houston Dynamo, previously on loan)
—	FW	MEX	Brayan Martínez (to (Guatemala) Xelajú, previously on loan at Murciélagos)

=== Morelia ===
In: Note: Flags indicate national team as defined under FIFA eligibility rules; some limited exceptions apply. Players may hold more than one non-FIFA nationality.

No.	Pos.	Nation	Player
7	MF	MEX	Diego Mejía (re-loan from Sinaloa)
8	MF	MEX	Juan Pablo Rodríguez (re-loan from Santos Laguna)
12	MF	MEX	Rodolfo Vilchis (re-loan from Atlas)
14	FW	COL	Jefferson Duque (on loan from Atlas, previously on loan at (Colombia) Deportivo Cali)
17	DF	ARG	Emanuel Loeschbor (re-loan from Cruz Azul)
19	MF	PER	Ray Sandoval (from (Peru) Sporting Cristal)
31	MF	ARG	Gastón Lezcano (from (Chile) O'Higgins, previously on loan)
108	FW	MEX	Ulises Jaimes (loan return from Zacatepec)
310	FW	MEX	Édgar Huerta (loan return from Oaxaca)

Out: Note: Flags indicate national team as defined under FIFA eligibility rules; some limited exceptions apply. Players may hold more than one non-FIFA nationality.

No.	Pos.	Nation	Player
2	DF	MEX	Enrique Pérez (loan return to Atlas)
22	MF	PER	Andy Polo (on loan to (United States) Portland Timbers)
23	MF	COL	Jefferson Cuero (on loan to (Colombia) América de Cali)
—	GK	MEX	Guillermo Pozos (on loan to Murciélagos, previously on loan at Celaya)
—	GK	MEX	Israel Villaseñor (retired, previously on loan at Puebla)
—	DF	MEX	Joel Huiqui (to (United States) Las Vegas Lights, previously on loan at UAEM)
—	MF	MEX	Tony Figueroa (to Pachuca, previously on loan)
—	MF	MEX	Cristian Gordillo (to (United States) California United, previously on loan at Juárez)
—	MF	MEX	Luis Morales (on loan to UAT, previously on loan at Mineros de Zacatecas)
—	MF	MEX	Christian Valdez (on loan to UdeG, previously on loan at Veracruz)
—	FW	COL	Yorleys Mena (unattached, previously on loan at (Colombia) Alianza Petrolera)

=== Necaxa ===
In: Note: Flags indicate national team as defined under FIFA eligibility rules; some limited exceptions apply. Players may hold more than one non-FIFA nationality.

No.	Pos.	Nation	Player
24	MF	MEX	Fernando González (on loan from Guadalajara, previously on loan at Zacatepec)
28	MF	CRC	Gerson Torres (on loan from (Costa Rica) Herediano, previously on loan at América)
29	MF	CHI	Marcelo Allende (loan return from (Chile) Santa Cruz)
31	DF	USA	Ventura Alvarado (from Santos Laguna)
34	MF	COL	Gustavo Culma (from (Bulgaria) CSKA Sofia)
35	FW	ECU	Bryan de Jesús (from (Ecuador) El Nacional)
307	MF	USA	Christian Lucatero (from (United States) Houston Dynamo)

Out: Note: Flags indicate national team as defined under FIFA eligibility rules; some limited exceptions apply. Players may hold more than one non-FIFA nationality.

No.	Pos.	Nation	Player
11	MF	MEX	Jesús Isijara (to Santos Laguna)
14	MF	URU	Diego Riolfo (to (Argentina) Godoy Cruz)
16	MF	CHI	Manuel Iturra (to (Spain) Málaga)
22	DF	MEX	Édgar Alaffita (on loan to Oaxaca)
23	FW	ARG	Facundo Pereyra (to (Argentina) Gimnasia)
27	FW	MEX	Othoniel Arce (loan return to Monterrey)
30	FW	PAR	Pablo Velázquez (loan return to Toluca)
288	MF	MEX	Baruch Luna (on loan to Atlante)
289	MF	MEX	José Cobián (on loan to Atlante)
301	MF	MEX	Sergio Bueno (on loan to Atlante)
—	DF	MEX	Luis Hernández (re-loan to Tapachula, previously acquired from Puebla)
—	MF	MEX	Jorge Sánchez (re-loan to Atlético San Luis)

=== Pachuca ===
In: Note: Flags indicate national team as defined under FIFA eligibility rules; some limited exceptions apply. Players may hold more than one non-FIFA nationality.

No.	Pos.	Nation	Player
9	FW	PAR	Walter González (on loan from (Paraguay) Olimpia)
10	MF	MEX	Christian Giménez (on loan from Cruz Azul)
11	MF	USA	Kekuta Manneh (from (United States) Columbus Crew)
19	MF	MEX	Tony Figueroa (from Morelia, previously on loan)
29	FW	ARG	Franco Jara (re-signed)
32	DF	COL	Dairon Mosquera (from (Colombia) Santa Fe)
34	MF	ARG	Sebastián Palacios (loan return from (Argentina) Talleres)
35	DF	MEX	Salomón Wbias (loan return from (United States) Orange County)

Out: Note: Flags indicate national team as defined under FIFA eligibility rules; some limited exceptions apply. Players may hold more than one non-FIFA nationality.

No.	Pos.	Nation	Player
9	FW	ARG	Germán Cano (to (Colombia) Independiente Medellín)
10	MF	URU	Jonathan Urretaviscaya (to Monterrey)
11	DF	CHI	Edson Puch (on loan to Querétaro)
32	DF	MEX	Héctor López (on loan to Zacatecas)
—	GK	MEX	Rodolfo Cota (re-loan to Guadalajara)
—	DF	MEX	Francisco Santillán (on loan to Zacatecas, previously on loan at UAT)
—	MF	MEX	Steven Almeida (on loan to Zacatecas, previously on loan at (Chile) Everton)
—	MF	MEX	Ángel Bautista (on loan to Morelos, previously on loan at Oaxaca)
—	MF	MEX	Emilio García (unattached, previously on loan at (United States) Rio Grande Valley Toros)
—	MF	MEX	Julio Gómez (on loan to Cruz Azul Hidalgo, previously on loan at Zacatepec)
—	MF	MEX	Éder López (on loan to Morelos, previously on loan at Zacatecas)
—	MF	MEX	Fernando Madrigal (re-loan to Zacatecas)
—	MF	ECU	Cristian Penilla (on loan at (United States) New England Revolution, previously on loan at (Brazil) Chapecoense)
—	FW	MEX	Marco Bueno (on loan to (Chile) Everton, previously on loan at Monterrey)

=== Puebla ===
In: Note: Flags indicate national team as defined under FIFA eligibility rules; some limited exceptions apply. Players may hold more than one non-FIFA nationality.

No.	Pos.	Nation	Player
11	MF	URU	Christian Tabó (on loan from Atlas)
15	DF	MEX	Diego Cruz (on loan from Atlas)
16	DF	BRA	Matheus Ribeiro (on loan from (Brazil) Santos)
18	FW	MEX	Darío Carreño (free agent, last with Sonora)
19	DF	MEX	Fernando Ruíz (on loan from Atlas, previously on loan at Juárez)
20	FW	COL	Omar Fernández (from (Peru) Melgar)
25	MF	MEX	Jorge Enríquez (on loan from Guadalajara, previously on loan at Santos Laguna)
26	MF	PER	Anderson Santamaría (from (Peru) Melgar)
33	MF	BOL	Alejandro Chumacero (from (Bolivia) The Strongest)
34	GK	URU	Nicolás Vikonis (from (Colombia) Millonarios)

Out: Note: Flags indicate national team as defined under FIFA eligibility rules; some limited exceptions apply. Players may hold more than one non-FIFA nationality.

No.	Pos.	Nation	Player
1	GK	MEX	Israel Villaseñor (loan return to Morelia)
6	MF	URU	Pablo Míguez (to (Peru) Melgar)
9	FW	MEX	Jerónimo Amione (on loan to BUAP)
10	FW	COL	Félix Micolta (on loan to (Colombia) América de Cali)
16	MF	MEX	David Toledo (loan return to Guadalajara)
19	MF	PLE	Carlos Salom (on loan to (Thailand) Bangkok United)
24	FW	ARG	Jonás Aguirre (loan return to (Argentina) Rosario Central)
33	DF	URU	Pablo Cáceres (unattached)
34	FW	ARG	Gabriel Esparza (loan return to (Argentina) San Lorenzo)
—	GK	MEX	Ricardo Ferriño (to (United States) Las Vegas Lights, previously on loan at Venados)
—	DF	MEX	Ángelo Costanzo (unattached, previously on loan at Tapachula)
—	DF	MEX	Luis Hernández (to Necaxa, previously on loan at Tapachula)
—	MF	CHI	Mario Erpel (to Atlante)
—	MF	MEX	Juan Carlos García (to (United States) Las Vegas Lights)
—	FW	MEX	Adrián Marín (on loan to (Costa Rica) Herediano, previously on loan at Tapachula)

=== Querétaro ===
In: Note: Flags indicate national team as defined under FIFA eligibility rules; some limited exceptions apply. Players may hold more than one non-FIFA nationality.

No.	Pos.	Nation	Player
4	DF	ARG	Diego Novaretti (on loan from León)
10	MF	CHI	Edson Puch (on loan from Pachuca)
11	MF	PER	Joel Sánchez (on loan from UANL, previously on loan at (Peru) Sporting Cristal)
15	FW	URU	Matías Britos (from (Saudi Arabia) Al-Hilal)
16	DF	PAR	Miguel Samudio (from América)
27	DF	MEX	Hiram Mier (from Monterrey, previously on loan)
35	MF	USA	Luis Gil (loan return from (United States) Colorado Rapids)
89	DF	MEX	Luis Romo (loan return from Sonora)
91	MF	MEX	Martín Orozco (loan return from Sonora)
97	DF	MEX	Ángel Elvira (from UNAM)

Out: Note: Flags indicate national team as defined under FIFA eligibility rules; some limited exceptions apply. Players may hold more than one non-FIFA nationality.

No.	Pos.	Nation	Player
4	DF	MEX	Ricardo Peña (on loan to Sonora)
10	MF	MEX	Édgar Gerardo Lugo (loan return to UANL)
15	DF	MEX	Juan de Alba (on loan to Sonora)
18	DF	MEX	Luis Esqueda (unattached)
21	MF	MEX	Marco Jiménez (retired)
22	MF	MEX	Brian Martínez (on loan to Sonora)
30	FW	ARG	Emanuel Villa (on loan to Celaya)
82	MF	MEX	Aldo Quintanilla (to (United States) Rio Grande Valley Toros)
83	MF	MEX	Cristian Quiñones (on loan to Sonora)
91	MF	MEX	Mathews Gómes Da Silva (on loan to Sonora)
281	GK	USA	Benny Díaz (on loan to Sonora)
292	MF	USA	Jonathan Suárez (on loan to Sonora)
310	MF	MEX	Cristian Haro (on loan to Tapachula)
—	GK	MEX	Luis Manuel García (re-loan to Toluca)
—	GK	MEX	Liborio Sánchez (unattached, previously on loan at (Colombia) Alianza Petrolera)
—	MF	MEX	Diego Andrade (on loan to Irapuato, previously on loan at Sonora)
—	MF	ARG	Nery Domínguez (on loan to (Argentina) Racing, previously on loan at (Argentina) Independiente)
—	MF	MEX	Juan Carlos López (re-loan to Oaxaca)
—	MF	MEX	Manuel López Mondragón (re-loan to Venados)
—	FW	CHI	Patricio Rubio (re-loan to (Chile) Everton)

=== Santos Laguna ===
In: Note: Flags indicate national team as defined under FIFA eligibility rules; some limited exceptions apply. Players may hold more than one non-FIFA nationality.

No.	Pos.	Nation	Player
3	DF	URU	Gerardo Alcoba (from UNAM)
5	DF	MEX	Óscar Bernal (loan return from Tampico Madero)
7	MF	MEX	Jesús Isijara (from Necaxa)
20	MF	CHI	Bryan Rabello (loan return from UNAM)
23	MF	MEX	José Juan Vázquez (from Guadalajara)
30	FW	PAR	Cris Martínez (on loan from (Chile) Deportes Temuco)

Out: Note: Flags indicate national team as defined under FIFA eligibility rules; some limited exceptions apply. Players may hold more than one non-FIFA nationality.

No.	Pos.	Nation	Player
3	DF	USA	Ventura Alvarado (to Necaxa)
7	MF	MEX	Gael Sandoval (to Guadalajara)
8	MF	ARG	Emiliano Armenteros (to (Spain) Rayo Vallecano)
25	MF	MEX	Jorge Enríquez (loan return to Guadalajara)
29	FW	MEX	Ronaldo Cisneros (to Guadalajara)
82	DF	MEX	Óscar Manzanarez (on loan to Tampico Madero)
87	MF	MEX	Mario Rodríguez (on loan to (Costa Rica) Guadalupe)
88	MF	MEX	Moisés Arce (on loan to (Costa Rica) Guadalupe)
—	DF	MEX	Uriel Álvarez (on loan to Atlante)
—	DF	MEX	César Ibáñez (unattached, previously on loan at Atlético San Luis)
—	DF	MEX	Luis Lozoya (on loan to Irapuato, previously on loan at Celaya)
—	MF	MEX	Sergio Ceballos (re-loan to Tampico Madero)
—	MF	COL	Mauricio Cuero (on loan to (Paraguay) Olimpia, previously on loan at Tijuana)
—	MF	MEX	Diego Esqueda (re-loan to Tampico Madero)
—	MF	MEX	Kevin Lara (on loan to Atlético San Luis, previously on loan at Tampico Madero)
—	MF	MEX	Alejandro Martínez (to (Bosnia and Herzegovina) Travnik)
—	MF	MEX	Javier Que (on loan to Tuxtla, previously on loan at Tampico Madero)
—	MF	MEX	Juan Pablo Rodríguez (re-loan to Morelia)
—	MF	MEX	Jaime Toledo (re-loan to Juárez)

=== Tijuana ===
In: Note: Flags indicate national team as defined under FIFA eligibility rules; some limited exceptions apply. Players may hold more than one non-FIFA nationality.

No.	Pos.	Nation	Player
8	MF	URU	Ignacio Rivero (on loan from (Argentina) Defensa y Justicia)
12	DF	PAR	Pablo Aguilar (from América)
17	MF	BRA	Mateus Gonçalves (on loan from Zacatepec, previously on loan at Toluca)
20	FW	ECU	Julio Angulo (from (Argentina) Huracán)
28	DF	MEX	Omar Mendoza (on loan from Cruz Azul)
29	GK	MEX	Luis Ernesto Michel (loan return from Sinaloa)
33	MF	USA	Fernando Arce (loan return from Sinaloa)
34	FW	MEX	José Alberto García (loan return from Tapachula)
35	FW	USA	Rubio Rubin (from (Norway) Stabæk)

Out: Note: Flags indicate national team as defined under FIFA eligibility rules; some limited exceptions apply. Players may hold more than one non-FIFA nationality.

No.	Pos.	Nation	Player
2	DF	ARG	Alejandro Donatti (to (Argentina) Racing)
4	GK	MEX	José Antonio Rodríguez (loan return to Guadalajara)
8	MF	USA	Joe Corona (on loan to América)
11	FW	MEX	Henry Martín (to América)
13	DF	URU	Matías Aguirregaray (on loan to (Spain) Las Palmas)
17	MF	COL	Mauricio Cuero (loan return to Santos Laguna)
19	DF	ARG	Emanuel Aguilera (to América)
21	MF	ARG	Enzo Kalinski (loan return to (Chile) Universidad Cátolica)
22	DF	MEX	Juan Carlos Núñez (retired)
23	DF	MEX	Juan Pablo Meza (loan return to Sinaloa)
27	MF	ARG	Matías Pisano (loan return to (Brazil) Cruzeiro)
84	MF	MEX	Adrián Ramos (on loan to Sinaloa)
93	MF	MEX	Ramón Ceja (on loan to Sinaloa)
98	DF	MEX	Mario Quezada (loan return to Toluca)
102	FW	USA	Jesús Enríquez (to (United States) Rio Grande Valley Toros)
—	DF	MEX	Luis Eduardo García (on loan to Tuxtla, previously on loan at Sinaloa)
—	DF	MEX	Miguel Garduño (to (United States) Las Vegas Lights)
—	DF	USA	Greg Garza (to (United States) Atlanta United, previously on loan)
—	DF	MEX	José Madueña (to Cruz Azul, previously on loan at Atlas)
—	DF	USA	John Requejo (to (United States) LA Galaxy II, previously on loan at Sinaloa)
—	DF	MEX	Rodrigo Salinas (to Toluca, previously on loan)
—	DF	MEX	Christian Torres (to (United States) Las Vegas Lights, previously on loan at Sinaloa)
—	MF	MEX	Raúl Enríquez (re-loan to Juárez)
—	MF	BRA	Juninho (unattached, previously on loan at (United States) Chicago Fire)
—	FW	ARG	Gabriel Hauche (re-loan to Toluca)
—	FW	ARG	Alfredo Moreno (re-loan to Celaya)
—	FW	USA	Amando Moreno (to (United States) New York Red Bulls, previously on loan at Sinaloa)
—	FW	COL	Humberto Osorio (to (Colombia) Rionegro Águilas, previously on loan at (Colombia) Santa Fe)

=== Toluca ===
In: Note: Flags indicate national team as defined under FIFA eligibility rules; some limited exceptions apply. Players may hold more than one non-FIFA nationality.

No.	Pos.	Nation	Player
7	FW	ARG	Gabriel Hauche (re-loan from Tijuana)
10	MF	MEX	Ángel Reyna (on loan from Celaya)
17	MF	MEX	Leonel López (on loan from León)
22	GK	MEX	Luis Manuel García (re-loan from Querétaro)
23	MF	COL	Luis Quiñones (on loan from UANL)
26	DF	COL	Cristian Borja (from (Colombia) Cortuluá)
29	DF	MEX	Rodrigo Salinas (from Tijuana, previously on loan)
93	FW	MEX	Brian Rubio (on loan from UANL)

Out: Note: Flags indicate national team as defined under FIFA eligibility rules; some limited exceptions apply. Players may hold more than one non-FIFA nationality.

No.	Pos.	Nation	Player
2	DF	MEX	Efraín Velarde (loan return to Monterrey)
8	DF	ARG	Jesús Méndez (to (Argentina) Vélez Sarsfield)
11	MF	MEX	Carlos Esquivel (on loan to Veracruz)
17	MF	BRA	Mateus Gonçalves (loan return to Zacatepec)
18	MF	USA	Rodrigo López (loan return to Celaya)
26	DF	MEX	Jesús García (loan return to Cruz Azul)
27	DF	ARG	Rodrigo Gómez (on loan to (Argentina) Unión de Santa Fe)
—	DF	MEX	Édgar Dueñas (unattached, previously on loan at UAEM)
—	DF	USA	Marco Jaime (to (United States) Las Vegas Lights, previously on loan at Matamoros)
—	DF	MEX	Mario Quezada (on loan to Murciélagos, previously on loan at Tijuana)
—	MF	MEX	Juan Calderón (to (United States) Las Vegas Lights)
—	MF	MEX	Renato Román (re-loan to Oaxaca)
—	MF	MEX	Moisés Velasco (on loan to UAT, previously on loan at Sinaloa)
—	FW	MEX	Raúl Nava (on loan to Atlante)
—	FW	ENG	Antonio Pedroza (to (Ecuador) Olmedo)
—	FW	PAR	Pablo Velázquez (to (Paraguay) Guaraní, previously on loan at Necaxa)

=== UANL ===
In: Note: Flags indicate national team as defined under FIFA eligibility rules; some limited exceptions apply. Players may hold more than one non-FIFA nationality.

No.	Pos.	Nation	Player
3	DF	BRA	Juninho (re-signed)

Out: Note: Flags indicate national team as defined under FIFA eligibility rules; some limited exceptions apply. Players may hold more than one non-FIFA nationality.

No.	Pos.	Nation	Player
11	MF	MEX	Damián Álvarez (retired)
22	GK	MEX	Enrique Palos (on loan to Juárez)
34	FW	MEX	Brian Rubio (on loan to Toluca)
85	DF	MEX	José García (on loan to Atlético Reynosa)
—	DF	COL	Danilo Arboleda (from (Colombia) Patriotas Boyacá, loaned to (Colombia) América de Cali)
—	DF	ARG	Néstor Breitenbruch (from (Argentina) Independiente, loaned to UAT)
—	DF	USA	Juan Pablo Ocegueda (unattached, previously on loan at (United States) Orange County)
—	DF	MEX	Abraham Stringel (unattached, previously on loan at (Colombia) Alianza Petrolera)
—	MF	COL	Johan Arango (on loan to Juárez, previously on loan at (Colombia) Once Caldas)
—	MF	COL	Mauricio Gómez (from (Colombia) Patriotas Boyacá, loaned to (Colombia) Independiente Medellín)
—	MF	MEX	Édgar Gerardo Lugo (unattached, previously on loan at Querétaro)
—	MF	MEX	Uvaldo Luna (on loan to (Colombia) Once Caldas, previously on loan at Atlas)
—	MF	COL	William Palacios (on loan to (Paraguay) Sol de América, previously on loan at (Argentina) Aldosivi)
—	MF	COL	Luis Quiñones (on loan to Toluca)
—	MF	MEX	Simón Rodríguez (on loan to Tlaxcala, previously on loan at Atlante)
—	MF	PER	Joel Sánchez (on loan to Querétaro, previously on loan at (Peru) Sporting Cristal)
—	MF	BRA	Alan Santos (from (Brazil) Coritiba, loaned to Veracruz)
—	MF	MEX	Emmanuel Segura (on loan to Sinaloa, previously on loan at Juárez)
—	MF	ECU	Jordan Sierra (from (Ecuador) Delfín, loaned to BUAP)
—	FW	MEX	Enrique Esqueda (to (Poland) Arka Gdynia)
—	FW	PAR	Fernando Fernández (on loan to Atlante, previously on loan at (Colombia) América de Cali)
—	FW	COL	Carlos Ibargüen (on loan to Juárez, previously on loan at (Colombia) Cortuluá)
—	FW	COL	Arley Rodríguez (from (Colombia) Atlético Nacional, loaned to BUAP)

=== UNAM ===
In: Note: Flags indicate national team as defined under FIFA eligibility rules; some limited exceptions apply. Players may hold more than one non-FIFA nationality.

No.	Pos.	Nation	Player
3	DF	ESP	Alejandro Arribas (from (Spain) Deportivo La Coruña)
11	FW	ARG	Matías Alustiza (on loan from Atlas)
16	DF	MEX	Luis Fuentes (loan return from Monterrey)
20	MF	COL	Yuber Asprilla (on loan from (Colombia) Alianza Petrolera)
31	FW	MEX	Erick Torres (from (United States) Houston Dynamo)
85	MF	MEX	Jorge Escamilla (loan return from Venados)
88	FW	MEX	Daniel Ramírez (loan return from Atlético Reynosa)

Out: Note: Flags indicate national team as defined under FIFA eligibility rules; some limited exceptions apply. Players may hold more than one non-FIFA nationality.

No.	Pos.	Nation	Player
3	DF	URU	Gerardo Alcoba (to Santos Laguna)
11	MF	CHI	Bryan Rabello (loan return to Santos Laguna)
16	DF	MEX	Ángel Elvira (to Querétaro)
307	MF	MEX	Diego Barrón (on loan to Venados)
—	GK	MEX	Odín Patiño (to (Andorra) Inter d'Escaldes)
—	DF	MEX	Marcelo Alatorre (to (United States) Las Vegas Lights, previously on loan at Venados)
—	DF	ESP	Lauren Egea (unattached, previously on loan at Zacatepec)
—	MF	MEX	Fernando Espinosa (on loan to Celaya)
—	MF	ARG	Franco Faría (re-loan to Venados)
—	MF	MEX	José Antonio Medina (on loan to Cancún, previously on loan at Venados)
—	MF	MEX	Miguel Rebollo (on loan to UdeC, previously on loan at (Spain) Real Burgos)
—	FW	MEX	Alfonso Nieto (on loan to (Venezuela) Carabobo)
—	FW	MEX	Santiago Palacios-Macedo (unattached, previously on loan to Atlético San Luis)

=== Veracruz ===
In: Note: Flags indicate national team as defined under FIFA eligibility rules; some limited exceptions apply. Players may hold more than one non-FIFA nationality.

No.	Pos.	Nation	Player
2	DF	PER	Christian Ramos (from (Argentina) Gimnasia, previously on loan at (Ecuador) Emelec)
9	FW	COL	Miguel Murillo (on loan from (Colombia) Deportivo Cali)
15	MF	MEX	Carlos Esquivel (on loan from Toluca)
16	MF	URU	Juan Albín (re-signed)
17	FW	BRA	Neto Berola (on loan from (Brazil) Coritiba)
26	FW	MEX	Jesús Lara (on loan from Cruz Azul, previously on loan at Sonora)
30	FW	MEX	Ángel Lopez (on loan from Monterrey)
32	MF	PER	Wilder Cartagena (on loan from (Peru) Universidad San Martín)
33	MF	BRA	Alan Santos (on loan from UANL, previously with (Brazil) Coritiba)
105	FW	MEX	Norman Chávez (loan return from UAEM)
122	DF	MEX	Arturo Avilés (on loan from Atlante)

Out: Note: Flags indicate national team as defined under FIFA eligibility rules; some limited exceptions apply. Players may hold more than one non-FIFA nationality.

No.	Pos.	Nation	Player
2	DF	MEX	Kristian Álvarez (loan return to Guadalajara)
9	MF	ARG	Leandro Velázquez (to (Colombia) Rionegro Águilas)
14	MF	ARG	Cristian Pellerano (loan return to América)
15	MF	MEX	Giovani Hernández (loan return to Guadalajara)
16	MF	URU	Rafael Acosta (on loan to (Czech Republic) Zbrojovka Brno)
17	MF	COL	Fredy Hinestroza (to (Colombia) Rionegro Águilas)
25	FW	ARG	Rodrigo Holgado (to (Chile) Coquimbo Unido)
26	MF	MEX	Christian Valdez (loan return to Morelia)
30	FW	ARG	Leandro Díaz (to (Argentina) Atlético Tucumán)
32	MF	GHA	Geoffrey Acheampong (to (United States) LA Galaxy II)
33	GK	MEX	Sergio García (unattached)
—	GK	PER	Carlos Cáceda (from (Peru) Universitario, loaned to (Peru) Deportivo Municipal)
—	GK	MEX	Juan José García (on loan to Tampico Madero)
—	GK	MEX	Leonín Pineda (unattached, previously on loan at UAEM)
—	MF	MEX	Jehu Chiapas (to (Spain) Salmantino)
—	MF	CHI	Fernando Meneses (to (Chile) Unión La Calera, previously on loan at (Chile) Unión Española)
—	FW	MEX	Rafael Murguía (to (Guatemala) Mictlán, previously on loan at Celaya)

== Ascenso MX ==
=== Atlante ===
In: Note: Flags indicate national team as defined under FIFA eligibility rules; some limited exceptions apply. Players may hold more than one non-FIFA nationality.

No.	Pos.	Nation	Player
2	DF	PAR	Álex Garcete (from (Paraguay) General Díaz)
3	DF	MEX	Uriel Álvarez (on loan from Santos Laguna)
7	MF	MEX	Sergio Bueno (on loan from Necaxa)
8	MF	COL	Wilber Rentería (on loan from UAEM, previously on loan at Sonora)
9	FW	VEN	Giancarlo Maldonado (from (Bolivia) San José)
10	MF	ECU	Jairo Vélez (on loan from (Argentina) Vélez Sarsfield, previously on loan at (Peru) USMP)
16	MF	ARG	Ezequiel Esperón (on loan from (Brazil) Grêmio)
18	FW	MEX	Juan de Dios Hernández (on loan from Atlas)
19	FW	MEX	Raúl Nava (on loan from Toluca)
20	MF	MEX	David Salazar (on loan from América)
22	MF	PAR	Pedro Arce (on loan from (Paraguay) Sol de América)
25	MF	CHI	Mario Erpel (from Puebla)
26	MF	MEX	Baruch Luna (on loan from Necaxa)
28	MF	MEX	Gimer Mendoza (from Inter Playa del Carmen)
32	DF	BRA	Iago Soares (from (Costa Rica) Alajuelense)
33	MF	MEX	Diego Campos (on loan from UdeG)
34	MF	MEX	José Cobián (on loan from Necaxa)
36	FW	PAR	Fernando Fernández (on loan from UANL, previously on loan at (Colombia) América de Cali)

Out: Note: Flags indicate national team as defined under FIFA eligibility rules; some limited exceptions apply. Players may hold more than one non-FIFA nationality.

No.	Pos.	Nation	Player
2	DF	MEX	Cuauhtémoc Domínguez (unattached)
7	FW	MEX	Raúl Suárez (on loan to Pacific)
8	FW	MEX	Carlos Cauich (on loan to Oaxaca)
9	FW	MEX	David Izazola (to (Spain) Salmantino)
10	MF	CHI	Felipe Reynero (to (Chile) Curicó Unido)
16	DF	MEX	Manuel Marroquín (on loan to Sinaloa)
18	DF	MEX	Irving Zurita (on loan to BUAP)
19	DF	MEX	Shelby Martínez (unattached)
20	FW	MEX	Óscar Uscanga (on loan to Tampico Madero)
22	MF	MEX	Fernando Herrera (on loan to Tampico Madero)
25	DF	MEX	Arturo Avilés (on loan to Veracruz)
26	FW	MEX	Marcelo Gracia (loan return to Monterrey)
28	MF	USA	Adrián Villa (unattached)
32	DF	MEX	Jorge Marzuca (on loan to Cancún)
33	MF	MEX	Simón Rodríguez (loan return to UANL)
—	DF	MEX	Omar Domínguez (to (Guatemala) Guastatoya, previously on loan at Celaya)
—	MF	MEX	Francisco Estrada (unattached, previously on loan at Oaxaca)
—	FW	MEX	Alberto Jorge García (on loan to Tampico Madero)

=== Atlético San Luis ===
In: Note: Flags indicate national team as defined under FIFA eligibility rules; some limited exceptions apply. Players may hold more than one non-FIFA nationality.

No.	Pos.	Nation	Player
5	DF	ESP	Mario (from (Thailand) BEC Tero Sasana)
6	MF	MLI	Mohamed Sissoko (from (Indonesia) Mitra Kukar)
9	FW	ARG	Nicolás Ibáñez (from (Argentina) Gimnasia)
11	FW	MEX	Jahir Barraza (on loan from Atlas)
15	MF	MEX	Jorge Sánchez (re-loan from Necaxa)
26	DF	ARG	Matías Catalán (loan return from (Argentina) Estudiantes)
29	MF	MEX	Kevin Lara (on loan from Santos Laguna, previously on loan at Tampico Madero)
32	MF	ARG	Leandro Torres (from (Belarus) Dynamo Brest)
33	GK	MEX	Daniel Vogel (on loan from UAT)

Out: Note: Flags indicate national team as defined under FIFA eligibility rules; some limited exceptions apply. Players may hold more than one non-FIFA nationality.

No.	Pos.	Nation	Player
4	DF	URU	Emilio MacEachen (loan return to (Uruguay) Peñarol)
5	DF	MEX	César Ibáñez (loan return to Santos Laguna)
9	FW	ARG	Sebastián Penco (on loan to Murciélagos)
11	FW	MEX	Santiago Palacios-Macedo (loan return to UNAM)
28	DF	MEX	Ulises Zurita (loan return to Guadalajara)
—	DF	MEX	Jonathan Miramontes (unattached, previously on loan to UAEM)

=== Celaya ===
In: Note: Flags indicate national team as defined under FIFA eligibility rules; some limited exceptions apply. Players may hold more than one non-FIFA nationality.

No.	Pos.	Nation	Player
6	MF	USA	Rodrigo López (loan return from Toluca)
10	FW	ARG	Alfredo Moreno (re-loan from Tijuana)
13	FW	COL	Yessy Mena (from (Colombia) Atlético Huila)
15	FW	MEX	Aldo Magaña (on loan from León, previously on loan at (Costa Rica) Guadalupe)
16	MF	MEX	Fernando Espinosa (on loan from UNAM)
21	MF	COL	William Arboleda (from (Colombia) América de Cali)
32	FW	ARG	Emanuel Villa (on loan from Querétaro)

Out: Note: Flags indicate national team as defined under FIFA eligibility rules; some limited exceptions apply. Players may hold more than one non-FIFA nationality.

No.	Pos.	Nation	Player
2	DF	MEX	Omar Domínguez (loan return to Atlante)
12	DF	MEX	Luis Lozoya (loan return to Santos Laguna)
13	MF	MEX	Ángel Reyna (on loan to Toluca)
25	MF	CHI	Sergio Riffo (loan return to (Chile) Everton)
27	FW	MEX	Rafael Murguía (loan return to Veracruz)
32	GK	MEX	Guillermo Pozos (loan return to Morelia)

=== Juárez ===
In: Note: Flags indicate national team as defined under FIFA eligibility rules; some limited exceptions apply. Players may hold more than one non-FIFA nationality.

No.	Pos.	Nation	Player
1	GK	MEX	Enrique Palos (on loan from UANL)
8	MF	BRA	Matheus (from (Brazil) Audax)
10	MF	MEX	Raúl Enríquez (re-loan from Tijuana)
16	MF	COL	Johan Arango (on loan from UANL, previously on loan at (Colombia) Once Caldas)
21	FW	COL	Carlos Ibargüen (on loan from UANL, previously on loan at (Colombia) Cortuluá)
26	MF	MEX	Jaime Toledo (re-loan from Santos Laguna)

Out: Note: Flags indicate national team as defined under FIFA eligibility rules; some limited exceptions apply. Players may hold more than one non-FIFA nationality.

No.	Pos.	Nation	Player
1	DF	MEX	Juan Carlos Rojas (loan return to León)
8	MF	MEX	Cristian Gordillo (loan return to Morelia)
16	MF	MEX	Emmanuel Segura (loan return to UANL)
21	GK	MEX	Antonio Iriarte (loan return to BUAP)
22	DF	MEX	Fernando Ruíz (loan return to Atlas)

=== Murciélagos ===
In: Note: Flags indicate national team as defined under FIFA eligibility rules; some limited exceptions apply. Players may hold more than one non-FIFA nationality.

No.	Pos.	Nation	Player
1	GK	MEX	Guillermo Pozos (on loan from Morelia, previously on loan at Celaya)
13	DF	MEX	Gil Burón (on loan from América)
14	DF	MEX	Jesús García (on loan from Cruz Azul, previously on loan at Toluca)
15	FW	MEX	William Guzmán (on loan from Guadalajara, previously on loan at Zacatepec)
19	DF	MEX	Mario Quezada (on loan from Toluca, previously on loan at Tijuana)
20	MF	VEN	Luis Vargas (from (Venezuela) Deportivo Táchira)
28	MF	GHA	Joseph Bempah (from (Serbia) Vojvodina)
32	DF	SKN	Atiba Harris (from (United States) Dallas)
33	FW	ARG	Sebastián Penco (on loan from Atlético San Luis)
34	DF	URU	Federico Alonso (from (Ecuador) Fuerza Amarilla)
36	DF	BRA	Renan (from (Serbia) Vojvodina)
37	MF	MEX	Ricardo Bocanegra (on loan from Atlas, previously on loan at (Nicaragua) Real Estelí)
38	MF	MEX	André Aguilar (on loan from Monterrey)
39	MF	MEX	Mauricio Castañeda (on loan from León, previously on loan at (Nicaragua) Real Madriz)
40	FW	GHA	Francis Afriyie (from (Serbia) Vojvodina)

Out: Note: Flags indicate national team as defined under FIFA eligibility rules; some limited exceptions apply. Players may hold more than one non-FIFA nationality.

No.	Pos.	Nation	Player
4	DF	MEX	Valentín Arredondo (retired)
7	FW	MEX	Brayan Martínez (loan return to Monterrey)
10	MF	TRI	Jomal Williams (on loan to (Azerbaijan) Zira)
11	FW	TRI	Shahdon Winchester (on loan to (Azerbaijan) Kapaz)
14	FW	MEX	Stefano Rodríguez (on loan to Zacatepec)
19	GK	ARG	Carlos Kletnicki (unattached)
20	MF	URU	Nicolás Vigneri (to (Uruguay) Fénix)
21	DF	MEX	Diego Jiménez (loan return to Zacatecas)

=== Oaxaca ===
In: Note: Flags indicate national team as defined under FIFA eligibility rules; some limited exceptions apply. Players may hold more than one non-FIFA nationality.

No.	Pos.	Nation	Player
5	DF	URU	Emilio MacEachen (on loan from (Uruguay) Peñarol, previously on loan at Atlético San Luis)
8	MF	MEX	Renato Román (re-loan from Toluca)
10	MF	MEX	David Toledo (on loan from Guadalajara, previously on loan at Puebla)
12	MF	MEX	Juan Carlos López (re-loan from Querétaro)
13	DF	MEX	Édgar Alaffita (on loan from Necaxa)
18	MF	MEX	Sergio Nápoles (on loan from Gaudalajara)
26	FW	MEX	Carlos Cauich (on loan from Atlante)
28	FW	MEX	Martín Zúñiga (re-loan from América)
29	MF	MEX	Carlos Rosel (on loan from América)

Out: Note: Flags indicate national team as defined under FIFA eligibility rules; some limited exceptions apply. Players may hold more than one non-FIFA nationality.

No.	Pos.	Nation	Player
10	MF	MEX	Francisco Rivera (loan return to América)
16	MF	MEX	Édgar Huerta (loan return to Morelia)
18	MF	MEX	Francisco Estrada (loan return to Atlante)
19	MF	MEX	Ángel Bautista (loan return to Pachuca)
22	DF	BRA	João Gabriel (to (Brazil) São Bento)
26	FW	MEX	Diego Castellanos (on loan to Tuxtla)
—	FW	MEX	Jesús Moreno (on loan to UAT, previously on loan at Tampico Madero)

=== Sinaloa ===
In: Note: Flags indicate national team as defined under FIFA eligibility rules; some limited exceptions apply. Players may hold more than one non-FIFA nationality.

No.	Pos.	Nation	Player
42	MF	MEX	Ramón Ceja (on loan from Tijuana)
43	MF	COL	Mateo Cardona (on loan from (Colombia) Once Caldas)
48	MF	MEX	Jorge Ibarra (on loan from BUAP)
52	MF	MEX	Adrián Ramos (on loan from Tijuana)
56	DF	MEX	Richard Okunorobo (on loan from BUAP)
61	MF	MEX	Emmanuel Segura (on loan from UANL, previously on loan at Juárez)
64	MF	MEX	Christian López (from Zacatecas)
65	DF	MEX	Manuel Marroquín (on loan from Atlante)
67	DF	MEX	Juan Pablo Meza (loan return from Tijuana)
71	GK	ARG	Cristian Campestrini (from (Argentina) Chacarita Juniors)
72	FW	PAR	Gustavo Ramírez (on loan from Zacatecas, previously on loan at Sonora)

Out: Note: Flags indicate national team as defined under FIFA eligibility rules; some limited exceptions apply. Players may hold more than one non-FIFA nationality.

No.	Pos.	Nation	Player
42	DF	USA	John Requejo (loan return to Tijuana)
43	DF	MEX	Luis Eduardo García (loan return to Tijuana)
46	FW	MEX	Flavio Santos (loan return to Atlas)
49	FW	USA	Amando Moreno (loan return to Tijuana)
53	DF	MEX	Christian Torres (loan return to Tijuana)
66	FW	COL	Jairo Molina (on loan to (Colombia) Deportivo Pasto)
67	GK	MEX	Luis Ernesto Michel (loan return to Tijuana)
68	MF	USA	Fernando Arce (loan return to Tijuana)
71	MF	MEX	Moisés Velasco (loan return to Toluca)
—	MF	MEX	Diego Mejía (re-loan to Morelia)
—	FW	MEX	Johan Mendívil (to Pacific)

=== Sonora ===
In: Note: Flags indicate national team as defined under FIFA eligibility rules; some limited exceptions apply. Players may hold more than one non-FIFA nationality.

No.	Pos.	Nation	Player
5	DF	MEX	Juan de Alba (on loan from Querétaro)
19	MF	USA	Jonathan Suárez (on loan from Querétaro)
20	MF	MEX	Cristian Quiñones (on loan from Querétaro)
21	GK	USA	Benny Díaz (on loan from Querétaro)
22	MF	MEX	Brian Martínez (on loan from Querétaro)
24	DF	MEX	Ricardo Peña (on loan from Querétaro)
27	MF	MEX	Mathews Gómes Da Silva (on loan from Querétaro)

Out: Note: Flags indicate national team as defined under FIFA eligibility rules; some limited exceptions apply. Players may hold more than one non-FIFA nationality.

No.	Pos.	Nation	Player
3	DF	MEX	Jonathan Sánchez (loan return to América)
5	DF	MEX	Luis Romo (loan return to Querétaro)
19	MF	COL	Wilber Rentería (loan return to UAEM)
22	MF	MEX	Diego Andrade (loan return to Querétaro)
24	FW	MEX	Jesús Lara (loan return to Cruz Azul)
27	FW	PAR	Gustavo Ramírez (loan return to Zacatecas)
28	DF	MEX	Martín Orozco (loan return to Querétaro)

=== Tampico Madero ===
In: Note: Flags indicate national team as defined under FIFA eligibility rules; some limited exceptions apply. Players may hold more than one non-FIFA nationality.

No.	Pos.	Nation	Player
7	MF	MEX	Diego Esqueda (re-loan from Santos Laguna)
12	FW	COL	Joao Rodríguez (re-loan from (England) Chelsea)
14	MF	MEX	Sergio Ceballos (re-loan from Santos Laguna)
18	DF	MEX	Arturo Ledesma (re-loan from Guadalajara)
20	GK	MEX	Humberto Hernández (re-loan from UdeG)
25	MF	MEX	Ángel Andrade (free agent, last with Atlético Altamira)
26	DF	MEX	Óscar Manzanarez (on loan from Santos Laguna)
28	FW	MEX	Alberto Jorge García (on loan from Atlante)
30	MF	MEX	Pedro Vargas (on loan from Tapachula)
31	FW	MEX	Óscar Uscanga (on loan from Atlante)
32	MF	MEX	Fernando Herrera (on loan from Atlante)
33	GK	MEX	Juan José García (on loan from Veracruz)
34	FW	CRC	Mynor Escoe (from (Peru) UTC)

Out: Note: Flags indicate national team as defined under FIFA eligibility rules; some limited exceptions apply. Players may hold more than one non-FIFA nationality.

No.	Pos.	Nation	Player
1	FW	MEX	Jesús Moreno (loan return to Oaxaca)
4	DF	MEX	Óscar Bernal (loan return to Santos Laguna)
11	MF	MEX	Kevin Lara (loan return to Santos Laguna)
19	MF	MEX	Javier Que (loan return to Santos Laguna)
22	FW	ARG	Emiliano Bonfigli (to (Ecuador) Deportivo Cuenca)

=== Tapachula ===
In: Note: Flags indicate national team as defined under FIFA eligibility rules; some limited exceptions apply. Players may hold more than one non-FIFA nationality.

No.	Pos.	Nation	Player
17	MF	MEX	Cristian Haro (on loan from Querétaro)
21	FW	ECU	José Ayoví (from (Ecuador) Barcelona)
22	DF	MEX	Enrique Pérez (on loan from Atlas, previously on loan at Morelia)
23	FW	MEX	Brayan Villalobos (on loan from Atlas)
28	FW	ARG	Leonardo Ramos (from (Japan) Renofa Yamaguchi)
30	DF	MEX	Luis Hernández (re-loan from Necaxa, previously on loan from Puebla)
31	DF	ARG	Máximo Levi (from Real Zamora)
32	FW	ARG	Maximiliano Tejerina (from (Argentina) Banfield)
214	MF	MEX	Ezequiel Ruiz (free agent, last with Chiapas)

Out: Note: Flags indicate national team as defined under FIFA eligibility rules; some limited exceptions apply. Players may hold more than one non-FIFA nationality.

No.	Pos.	Nation	Player
1	DF	MEX	Severo Meza (loan return to Monterrey)
8	MF	SLV	Gerson Mayen (loan return to (El Salvador) Santa Tecla)
13	FW	MEX	Adrián Marín (loan return to Puebla)
14	FW	MEX	José Alberto García (loan return to Tijuana)
22	MF	MEX	Pedro Vargas (on loan to Tampico Madero)
23	DF	MEX	Ángelo Costanzo (loan return to Puebla)
28	GK	MEX	Guadalupe Martínez (loan return to Zacatecas)
31	DF	MEX	Aldair Mengual (on loan to Tuxtla)
32	FW	MEX	Adrián Castillo (unattached)

=== UAEM ===
In: Note: Flags indicate national team as defined under FIFA eligibility rules; some limited exceptions apply. Players may hold more than one non-FIFA nationality.

No.	Pos.	Nation	Player
6	DF	URU	Martín Ferreira (from (Uruguay) Cerro Largo)
8	MF	MEX	Édgar Solís (from (Spain) Real Burgos)
23	MF	ARG	Francesco Celeste (free agent, last with (Argentina) Quilmes)
28	MF	ARG	Ezequiel Ríos (free agent, last with (Malta) Tarxien Rainbows)
33	DF	BRA	Bronzatti (from (Brazil) Gama)

Out: Note: Flags indicate national team as defined under FIFA eligibility rules; some limited exceptions apply. Players may hold more than one non-FIFA nationality.

No.	Pos.	Nation	Player
1	GK	MEX	Leonín Pineda (loan return to Veracruz)
2	DF	MEX	Édgar Dueñas (loan return from Toluca)
6	DF	MEX	Joel Huiqui (loan return to Morelia)
8	DF	BRA	Medina (to (Brazil) Náutico)
23	DF	MEX	Jonathan Miramontes (loan return to Atlético San Luis)
24	FW	MEX	Norman Chávez (loan return to Veracruz)
28	FW	MEX	Édgar González (loan return to UdeG)
33	DF	MEX	David Stringel (loan return to Monterrey)
34	DF	MEX	Daniel Rendón (loan return to Zacatepec)
35	FW	MEX	Sinecio González (loan return to Cruz Azul)
—	MF	COL	Wilber Rentería (on loan to Atlante, previously on loan at Sonora)

=== UAT ===
In: Note: Flags indicate national team as defined under FIFA eligibility rules; some limited exceptions apply. Players may hold more than one non-FIFA nationality.

No.	Pos.	Nation	Player
4	DF	ARG	Néstor Breitenbruch (on loan from UANL)
16	MF	MEX	Moisés Velasco (on loan from Toluca, previously on loan at Sinaloa)
24	MF	MEX	Luis Morales (on loan from Morelia, previously on loan at Zacatecas)
27	FW	MEX	Jesús Moreno (on loan from Oaxaca, previously on loan at Tampico Madero)
32	FW	ARG	Juan Manuel Vázquez (from (Argentina) All Boys)
34	DF	MEX	Arturo Ortiz (on loan from León, previously on loan at Zacatecas)

Out: Note: Flags indicate national team as defined under FIFA eligibility rules; some limited exceptions apply. Players may hold more than one non-FIFA nationality.

No.	Pos.	Nation	Player
4	DF	MEX	Héctor Morales (loan return to Monterrey)
23	DF	MEX	Francisco Santillán (loan return to Pachuca)
31	FW	PAN	Omar Hinestroza (on loan to (Panama) Chorrillo)
82	MF	MEX	Luis Amaya (on loan to Monterrey)
84	MF	MEX	Andrés Rincón (to Atlético Reynosa)
—	GK	MEX	Daniel Vogel (on loan to Atlético San Luis)

=== UdeG ===
In: Note: Flags indicate national team as defined under FIFA eligibility rules; some limited exceptions apply. Players may hold more than one non-FIFA nationality.

No.	Pos.	Nation	Player
16	MF	BRA	Joãozinho (from (Brazil) XV de Novembro)
18	MF	COL	Óscar Guerrero (from (Malta) Għajnsielem)
20	MF	MEX	Christian Valdez (on loan from Morelia, previously on loan at Veracruz)
27	DF	MEX	Daniel Rendón (on loan from Zacatepec, previously on loan at UAEM)
33	DF	MEX	Néstor Vidrio (on loan from Guadalajara)
35	DF	MEX	Kristian Álvarez (on loan from Guadalajara, previously on loan at Veracruz)

Out: Note: Flags indicate national team as defined under FIFA eligibility rules; some limited exceptions apply. Players may hold more than one non-FIFA nationality.

No.	Pos.	Nation	Player
18	MF	MEX	Ricardo Reyes (on loan to Morelos)
25	MF	MEX	David Alcántar (loan return to León)
27	MF	MEX	José Damián (unattached)
32	DF	URU	Germán Ferreira (loan return to (Uruguay) Plaza Colonia)
33	DF	MEX	Edson Santos (on loan to Venados)
—	GK	MEX	Humberto Hernández (re-loan to Tampico Madero)
—	MF	MEX	Diego Campos (on loan to Atlante)
—	FW	MEX	Édgar González (retired, previously on loan to UAEM)

=== Venados ===
In: Note: Flags indicate national team as defined under FIFA eligibility rules; some limited exceptions apply. Players may hold more than one non-FIFA nationality.

No.	Pos.	Nation	Player
2	DF	MEX	Ulises Zurita (on loan from Guadalajara, previously on loan at Atlético San Luis)
5	MF	MEX	Manuel López Mondragón (re-loan from Querétaro)
13	DF	MEX	Edson Santos (on loan from UdeG)
15	MF	ARG	Leandro Navarro (on loan from (Argentina) San Lorenzo)
16	MF	USA	Fernando Mercado (from Irapuato)
20	DF	MEX	Jonathan Sánchez (on loan from América, previously on loan at Sonora)
25	FW	BRA	Chico (on loan from Inter Playa del Carmen)
28	MF	CHI	Alfonso Urbina (from (Chile) Barnechea)
30	MF	ARG	Franco Faría (re-loan from UNAM)
34	FW	MEX	Víctor Lojero (re-loan from Zacatecas)
35	MF	MEX	Diego Barrón (on loan from UNAM)

Out: Note: Flags indicate national team as defined under FIFA eligibility rules; some limited exceptions apply. Players may hold more than one non-FIFA nationality.

No.	Pos.	Nation	Player
3	DF	MEX	Marcelo Alatorre (loan return to UNAM)
4	DF	MEX	Rodrigo Íñigo (loan return to Zacatecas)
10	FW	ARG	Lucas Ontivero (to (Argentina) Chacarita Juniors)
14	MF	MEX	Jorge Escamilla (loan return to UNAM)
15	MF	MEX	José Manuel Rivera (to (El Salvador) Sonsonate)
16	GK	MEX	Ricardo Ferriño (loan return to Puebla)
19	MF	MEX	José Antonio Medina (loan return to UNAM)

=== Zacatecas ===
In: Note: Flags indicate national team as defined under FIFA eligibility rules; some limited exceptions apply. Players may hold more than one non-FIFA nationality.

No.	Pos.	Nation	Player
3	DF	MEX	Sergio Flores (on loan from Guadalajara, previously on loan at Zacatepec)
8	MF	MEX	Fernando Madrigal (re-loan from Pachuca)
11	MF	MEX	Steven Almeida (on loan from Pachuca, previously on loan at (Chile) Everton)
22	DF	MEX	Francisco Santillán (on loan from Pachuca, previously on loan at UAT)
23	MF	MEX	Francisco Rivera (on loan from América, previously on loan at Oaxaca)
102	DF	MEX	Héctor López (on loan from Pachuca)
107	MF	MEX	Josué Mercado (from Tlaxcala)

Out: Note: Flags indicate national team as defined under FIFA eligibility rules; some limited exceptions apply. Players may hold more than one non-FIFA nationality.

No.	Pos.	Nation	Player
3	DF	MEX	Arturo Ortiz (loan return to León)
6	MF	MEX	Éder López (loan return to Pachuca)
11	MF	MEX	Luis Morales (loan return to Morelia)
21	MF	MEX	Édgar Villegas (on loan to Atlético Reynosa)
23	MF	MEX	Christian López (loan return to Sinaloa)
27	MF	MEX	Isaác Díaz (to (United States) Las Vegas Lights)
—	GK	MEX	Guadalupe Martínez (unattached, previously on loan at Tapachula)
—	DF	MEX	Rodrigo Íñigo (to (United States) Las Vegas Lights, previously on loan at Venados)
—	DF	MEX	Diego Jiménez (retired, previously on loan at Murciélagos)
—	FW	MEX	Víctor Lojero (re-loan to Venados)
—	FW	PAR	Gustavo Ramírez (on loan to Sinaloa, previously on loan at Sonora)

=== Zacatepec ===
In: Note: Flags indicate national team as defined under FIFA eligibility rules; some limited exceptions apply. Players may hold more than one non-FIFA nationality.

No.	Pos.	Nation	Player
2	DF	MEX	Diego Cortés (on loan from Guadalajara)
3	DF	MEX	Andrés Ramírez (on loan from Guadalajara)
9	MF	MEX	Giovani Hernández (on loan from Guadalajara, previously on loan at Veracruz)
17	MF	MEX	Kevin Magaña (on loan from Guadalajara)
18	MF	MEX	Ángel López (on loan from Guadalajara)
19	MF	CAN	Marco Bustos (on loan from (Canada) Vancouver Whitecaps)
23	GK	MEX	Víctor Hugo Hernández (re-loan from Guadalajara)
28	FW	MEX	Stefano Rodríguez (on loan from Murciélagos)

Out: Note: Flags indicate national team as defined under FIFA eligibility rules; some limited exceptions apply. Players may hold more than one non-FIFA nationality.

No.	Pos.	Nation	Player
2	DF	ESP	Lauren Egea (loan return to UNAM)
3	DF	MEX	Sergio Flores (loan return to Guadalajara)
8	MF	MEX	Julio Gómez (loan return to Pachuca)
9	FW	MEX	Daniel Ríos (loan return to Guadalajara)
12	FW	MEX	William Guzmán (loan return to Guadalajara)
15	FW	MEX	Luis Márquez (loan return to Guadalajara)
17	FW	MEX	Ulises Jaimes (loan return to Morelia)
21	DF	MEX	Carlos Lugo (loan return to Guadalajara)
27	MF	MEX	Fernando González (loan return to Guadalajara)
—	DF	MEX	Daniel Rendón (on loan to UdeG, previously on loan at UAEM)
—	MF	BRA	Mateus Gonçalves (on loan to Tijuana, previously on loan at Toluca)
—	FW	MEX	Josué Bustos (on loan to Matamoros, previously on loan at Morelos)
