= List of Mexican football transfers summer 2017 =

This is a list of Mexican football transfers for the 2017 summer transfer window, grouped by club. It only includes football transfers related to clubs from the Liga Bancomer MX, the top flight of Mexican football.

== Liga MX ==
=== América ===
In: Note: Flags indicate national team as defined under FIFA eligibility rules; some limited exceptions apply. Players may hold more than one non-FIFA nationality.

No.	Pos.	Nation	Player
2	DF	MEX	Carlos Vargas (from Tijuana)
5	MF	ARG	Guido Rodríguez (from Tijuana)
8	MF	COL	Mateus Uribe (from (Colombia) Atlético Nacional)
15	MF	MEX	Pedro Arce (from (Greece) Veria)
16	DF	MEX	Emilio Orrantía (on loan from Santos Laguna, previously on loan at Puebla)
19	FW	MEX	Alejandro Díaz (loan return from Necaxa)

Out: Note: Flags indicate national team as defined under FIFA eligibility rules; some limited exceptions apply. Players may hold more than one non-FIFA nationality.

No.	Pos.	Nation	Player
2	DF	ARG	Paolo Goltz (to (Argentina) Boca Juniors)
4	DF	MEX	Erik Pimentel (on loan to Puebla)
5	MF	MEX	Javier Güémez (to Querétaro)
11	MF	ECU	Michael Arroyo (to (Brazil) Grêmio)
15	DF	MEX	Osmar Mares (on loan to Veracruz)
21	MF	MEX	José Guerrero (on loan to Puebla)
109	MF	MEX	Francisco Rivera (on loan to Oaxaca)
307	DF	MEX	Bryan Colula (on loan to Necaxa)
—	GK	MEX	Moisés Muñoz (on loan to Puebla, previously on loan at Chiapas)
—	GK	MEX	Armando Navarrete (on loan to Venados, previously on loan at Zacatepec)
—	DF	MEX	Jonathan Sánchez (on loan to Sonora, previously on loan at Oaxaca)
—	MF	MEX	Gil Cordero (to (Spain) Real Burgos, previously on loan at Tepatitlán)
—	MF	URU	Brian Lozano (on loan to Santos Laguna, previously on loan at (Uruguay) Nacional)
—	MF	ARG	Cristian Pellerano (re-loan to Veracruz)
—	FW	MEX	Diego Pineda (on loan to Atlético San Luis, previously on loan at Venados)
—	FW	COL	Luis Gabriel Rey (retired, previously on loan at Morelia)
—	FW	MEX	Martín Zúñiga (on loan to Oaxaca, previously on loan at Tapachula)

=== Atlas ===
In: Note: Flags indicate national team as defined under FIFA eligibility rules; some limited exceptions apply. Players may hold more than one non-FIFA nationality.

No.	Pos.	Nation	Player
8	MF	MEX	Uvaldo Luna (on loan from UANL, previously on loan at (Colombia) Patriotas Boyacá)
16	DF	ARG	Facundo Erpen (loan return from Morelia)
17	FW	ARG	Milton Caraglio (from Tijuana)
19	MF	MEX	Juan Pablo Vigón (loan return from Tapachula)
28	MF	CMR	Patrick Soko (from (Dominican Republic) Cibao)
29	MF	MEX	Carlos Nava (loan return from Tampico Madero)
33	MF	ENG	Ravel Morrison (on loan from (Italy) Lazio, previously on loan at (England) Queens Park Rangers)
85	MF	MEX	Ángel Gaspar (loan return from Atlante)

Out: Note: Flags indicate national team as defined under FIFA eligibility rules; some limited exceptions apply. Players may hold more than one non-FIFA nationality.

No.	Pos.	Nation	Player
6	DF	MEX	Carlos Treviño (on loan to BUAP)
7	FW	MEX	Édson Rivera (on loan to Sinaloa)
8	MF	MEX	Daniel Álvarez (to Necaxa)
17	MF	MEX	Rodolfo Salinas (on loan to Celaya)
24	FW	MEX	Sergio Rodríguez (on loan to Oaxaca)
28	FW	MEX	Martín Barragán (on loan to Necaxa)
357	FW	MEX	Fernando Vázquez (on loan to Oaxaca)
—	GK	MEX	Jesús Alejandro Gallardo (retired, previously on loan at UAT)
—	DF	MEX	Yahir Elizalde (to (Spain) Real Burgos, previously on loan at (Panama) Alianza)
—	DF	MEX	Giovanni León (on loan to Murciélagos, previously on loan at Oaxaca)
—	DF	MEX	Pedro Terán (unattached, previously on loan at Venados)
—	MF	MEX	Lucas Ayala (retired, previously on loan at UAT)
—	MF	MEX	Ricardo Bocanegra (on loan to (Nicaragua) Real Estelí, previously on loan at UAT)
—	MF	MEX	Daniel Hernández (on loan to Atlante, previously on loan at Sinaloa)
—	MF	MEX	Juan Carlos Medina (on loan to BUAP, previously on loan at Tijuana)
—	MF	MEX	Luis Télles (on loan to Juárez, previously on loan at UdeG)
—	FW	COL	Franco Arizala (on loan to (Colombia) Atlético Bucaramanga, previously on loan at Chiapas)
—	FW	ARG	Juan Mare (to (United States) Real Monarchs, previously on loan at Puebla)
—	FW	MEX	Saúl Villalobos (to (Spain) Salmantino)

=== BUAP ===
In: Note: Flags indicate national team as defined under FIFA eligibility rules; some limited exceptions apply. Players may hold more than one non-FIFA nationality.

No.	Pos.	Nation	Player
1	GK	URU	Lucero Álvarez (on loan from Oaxaca)
3	DF	MEX	Francisco Rodríguez (on loan from Cruz Azul)
5	DF	MEX	Orlando Rincón (from Chiapas, previously on loan)
6	MF	MEX	Carlos Treviño (on loan from Atlas)
11	MF	MEX	Alfonso Tamay (on loan from UANL, previously on loan at Oaxaca)
12	DF	MEX	Heriberto Olvera (on loan from Pachuca, previously on loan to Zacatecas)
17	DF	PER	Luis Advíncula (on loan from UANL)
18	MF	PER	Pedro Aquino (on loan from Monterrey)
23	FW	ARG	Emanuel Herrera (on loan from (Ecuador) Emelec, previously on loan at (Peru) Melgar)
25	DF	MEX	Juan Carlos García (on loan from Cruz Azul)
26	MF	MEX	Juan Carlos Medina (on loan from Atlas, previously on loan at Tijuana)
28	DF	MEX	Carlos Adrián Morales (on loan from Morelia)
29	GK	MEX	Jorge Villalpando (from Chiapas)
32	MF	PAR	Jonathan Fabbro (from Chiapas)
33	FW	COL	Julián Quiñones (on loan from UANL)

Out: Note: Flags indicate national team as defined under FIFA eligibility rules; some limited exceptions apply. Players may hold more than one non-FIFA nationality.

No.	Pos.	Nation	Player
5	DF	MEX	Mario Quezada (loan return to Toluca)
10	MF	COL	Luis Quiñones (loan return to UANL)
10	FW	BRA	Ricardinho (to (Brazil) Londrina)
12	GK	MEX	Antonio Iriarte (on loan to Juárez)
14	DF	MEX	Nicolás Ruvalcaba (loan return to UANL)
15	MF	MEX	Diego Aguilar (loan return to Toluca)
18	FW	CHI	Héctor Mancilla (loan return to Morelia)
19	MF	MEX	Omar Marrufo (loan return to Atlante)
19	FW	COL	William Palacios (loan return to UANL)
20	MF	MEX	Luis Pérez (loan return to Necaxa)
21	DF	MEX	Marco Pérez (loan return to Pachuca)
25	FW	MEX	José Tehuitzil (on loan at Oaxaca)
30	MF	MEX	Jorge Ocampo (loan return to UAT)
35	MF	MEX	Diego Campos (loan return to UdeG)
—	GK	MEX	Ignacio Segreste (unattached, previously on loan at Zacatepec)
—	FW	MEX	Carlos Ortega (unattached, previously on loan at Venados)
—	FW	MEX	Michel Vázquez (on loan to (Colombia) Boyacá Chicó, previously on loan at Celaya)

=== Cruz Azul ===
In: Note: Flags indicate national team as defined under FIFA eligibility rules; some limited exceptions apply. Players may hold more than one non-FIFA nationality.

No.	Pos.	Nation	Player
9	FW	CHI	Felipe Mora (from Universidad de Chile)
15	DF	MEX	Gerardo Flores (loan return from Toluca)
17	MF	ESP	Édgar (from (Spain) Alavés)
18	MF	ARG	Alejandro Faurlín (from (Spain) Getafe)
30	DF	MEX	Jordan Silva (from Toluca)
284	MF	MEX	Alán Guadarrama (loan return from Celaya)

Out: Note: Flags indicate national team as defined under FIFA eligibility rules; some limited exceptions apply. Players may hold more than one non-FIFA nationality.

No.	Pos.	Nation	Player
3	DF	MEX	Francisco Rodríguez (on loan to BUAP)
9	FW	ECU	Joao Rojas (on loan to (Argentina) Talleres de Córdoba)
23	MF	MEX	Richard Ruíz (on loan to Veracruz)
25	DF	MEX	Juan Carlos García (on loan to BUAP)
27	FW	PAR	Jorge Benítez (to Monterrey)
28	DF	MEX	Jesús García (on loan to Toluca)
—	GK	MEX	Javier Caso (unattached, previously on loan at Zacatepec)
—	DF	MEX	Francisco Flores (on loan to Atlante, previously on loan at Tepic)
—	DF	MEX	Manuel Madrid (on loan to UdeG, previously on loan at UdeC)
—	MF	MEX	Allam Bello (on loan to UAEM, previously on loan at Oaxaca)
—	MF	ESP	Marc Crosas (unattached, previously on loan at Tampico Madero)
—	MF	MEX	Diego Franco (to (Spain) Salmantino, previously on loan at (Costa Rica) Belén)
—	MF	ARG	Mauro Formica (to UNAM, previously on loan at (Argentina) Newell's Old Boys)
—	MF	MEX	Héctor Gutiérrez (on loan to UAEM, previously on loan at Zacatepec)
—	MF	COL	Carlos Lizarazo (on loan at (Colombia) América de Cali, previously on loan at (Colombia) Alianza Petrolera)
—	MF	MEX	Omar Mendoza Martínez (unattached, previously on loan at Zacatepec)
—	MF	BRA	Lucas Silva (to (Brazil) Figueirense, previously on loan at Chiapas)
—	MF	MEX	Gabino Velasco (unattached, previously on loan at Venados)
—	FW	ARG	Jonatan Cristaldo (to (Argentina) Vélez Sarsfield, previously on loan at Monterrey)
—	FW	MEX	Martín Galván (to (Spain) Salmantino, previously on loan at Cancún)
—	FW	MEX	Fernando González (on loan to UAEM)
—	FW	ECU	Joffre Guerrón (to UNAM)
—	FW	MEX	Jesús Lara (on loan to Sonora, previously on loan at Zacatepec)
—	FW	MEX	Julio Pardini (unattached, previously on loan at (Costa Rica) Herediano)
—	FW	ARG	Pablo Torres (retired, previously on loan at Sinaloa)
—	FW	MEX	Matías Vuoso (retired, previously on loan at UAT)

=== Guadalajara ===
In: Note: Flags indicate national team as defined under FIFA eligibility rules; some limited exceptions apply. Players may hold more than one non-FIFA nationality.

No.	Pos.	Nation	Player
15	FW	MEX	Michelle Benítez (from Guadalajara Premier)
18	MF	MEX	Ángel López (from Guadalajara Premier)
35	GK	MEX	Antonio Torres (from Guadalajara Premier)

Out: Note: Flags indicate national team as defined under FIFA eligibility rules; some limited exceptions apply. Players may hold more than one non-FIFA nationality.

No.	Pos.	Nation	Player
16	DF	MEX	Miguel Ponce (on loan to Necaxa)
18	MF	MEX	Néstor Calderón (loan return to Santos Laguna)
19	FW	MEX	Guillermo Martínez (loan return to Pachuca)
29	MF	USA	Alejandro Zendejas (on loan to Zacatepec)
94	MF	MEX	Josué Lázaro (on loan to Zacatepec)
96	MF	MEX	Mauro Contreras (on loan to Zacatepec)
156	MF	MEX	Irving Ávalos (on loan to Juárez)
285	DF	MEX	Ulises Zurita (on loan to Atlético San Luis)
289	MF	MEX	Alan Cervantes (on loan to León)
307	MF	MEX	Armando González (on loan to Zacatepec)
—	GK	MEX	Sergio Arias (unattached, previously on loan at Sonora)
—	GK	MEX	Víctor Hugo Hernández (on loan to Zacatepec, previously on loan at Tepic)
—	GK	MEX	José Antonio Rodríguez (on loan to Tijuana, previously on loan at León)
—	DF	MEX	Abraham Coronado (re-loan to UdeC)
—	DF	MEX	Sergio Flores (on loan to Zacatepec, previously on loan at Tepic)
—	DF	USA	Jaime Frías (on loan to Atlético San Luis, previously on loan at Cancún)
—	DF	MEX	Carlos Lugo (on loan to Zacatepec, previously on loan at La Piedad)
—	DF	MEX	Mario Orozco (on loan to Zacatepec, previously on loan at Tepic)
—	DF	MEX	Carlos Salcedo (on loan to (Germany) Eintracht Frankfurt, previously on loan at (Italy) Fiorentina)
—	DF	MEX	Édgar Solís (to (Spain) Real Burgos)
—	DF	MEX	Carlos Villanueva (on loan to Zacatepec, previously on loan at Tepic)
—	DF	MEX	Néstor Vidrio (unattached, previously on loan at Sonora)
—	MF	MEX	Fernando González (on loan to Zacatepec, previously on loan at Tepic)
—	MF	MEX	Diego Hernández (on loan to La Piedad, previously on loan at UdeG)
—	MF	MEX	Giovani Hernández (on loan to Veracruz, previously on loan at Tepic)
—	MF	MEX	Édgar Mejía (on loan to Murciélagos, previously on loan at Juárez)
—	MF	MEX	Sergio Nápoles (unattached, previously on loan at Tepic)
—	MF	MEX	Carlos Peña (to (Scotland) Rangers, previously on loan at León)
—	FW	MEX	Marco Granados (on loan to UdeC, previously on loan at Tampico Madero)
—	FW	MEX	William Guzmán (on loan to Zacatepec, previously on loan at Tepic)
—	FW	MEX	Luis Márquez (on loan to Zacatepec, previously on loan at Tepic)
—	FW	MEX	Daniel Ríos (on loan to Zacatepec, previously on loan at Tepic)

=== León ===
In: Note: Flags indicate national team as defined under FIFA eligibility rules; some limited exceptions apply. Players may hold more than one non-FIFA nationality.

No.	Pos.	Nation	Player
1	GK	MEX	Carlos Felipe Rodríguez (on loan from Morelia)
4	DF	PAR	Iván Piris (on loan from Monterrey)
9	FW	CHI	Álvaro Ramos (from (Chile) Deportes Iquique)
18	MF	MEX	Alan Cervantes (on loan from Guadalajara)
19	MF	MEX	Mauro Laínez (on loan from Pachuca, previously on loan at Zacatecas)
21	FW	ARG	Maximiliano Cerato (from (Chile) Everton)
22	DF	MEX	Miguel Herrera (on loan from Pachuca, previously on loan at Veracruz)
26	DF	COL	Andrés Mosquera (from (Colombia) Independiente Medellín)

Out: Note: Flags indicate national team as defined under FIFA eligibility rules; some limited exceptions apply. Players may hold more than one non-FIFA nationality.

No.	Pos.	Nation	Player
1	GK	MEX	José Antonio Rodríguez (loan return to Guadalajara)
9	FW	ARG	Germán Cano (loan return to Pachuca)
15	DF	MEX	Carlos Guzmán (loan return to Morelia)
16	GK	MEX	Christian Martínez (end of contract)
21	MF	MEX	Diego de la Tejera (on loan to Celaya)
26	MF	MEX	Christian Valdez (loan return to Morelia)
27	MF	MEX	Carlos Peña (loan return to Guadalajara)
28	GK	MEX	César Ríos (unattached)
85	DF	MEX	Carlos Laureano (to (Spain) Eldense)
90	DF	MEX	Óscar Suárez (on loan to Zacatecas)
293	FW	MEX	Aldo Magaña (on loan to (Costa Rica) Guadalupe)
295	MF	MEX	Luis Annett (to (Andorra) Penya Encarnada)
300	MF	MEX	Leonel Munguía (unattached)
—	DF	MEX	Luis Delgado (on loan to UAT, previously on loan to Zacatecas)
—	DF	MEX	Arturo Ortiz (on loan to Zacatecas, previously on loan to UdeG)
—	DF	MEX	Iván Pineda (on loan to UAT, previously on loan at Tlaxcala)
—	MF	MEX	David Alcántar (on loan to UdeG)
—	MF	ECU	Marcos Caicedo (to (Ecuador) Barcelona, previously on loan)
—	MF	MEX	Mauricio Castañeda (on loan to (Nicaragua) Real Madriz, previously on loan at Tlaxcala)
—	MF	COL	Eisner Loboa (on loan to (Colombia) América de Cali, previously on loan at (Brazil) América Mineiro)
—	MF	MEX	Aldo Rocha (to Morelia, previously on loan)
—	FW	URU	Nelson Sebastián Maz (retired, previously loan at Celaya)
—	FW	MEX	Luis Nieves (on loan to UdeG)

=== Monterrey ===
In: Note: Flags indicate national team as defined under FIFA eligibility rules; some limited exceptions apply. Players may hold more than one non-FIFA nationality.

No.	Pos.	Nation	Player
11	DF	ARG	Leonel Vangioni (from (Italy) Milan)
18	FW	COL	Avilés Hurtado (from Tijuana)
19	MF	ARG	Neri Cardozo (loan return from Querétaro)
22	GK	ARG	Juan Pablo Carrizo (from (Italy) Internazionale)
27	FW	PAR	Jorge Benítez (from Cruz Azul)
33	DF	COL	Stefan Medina (loan return from Pachuca)
98	DF	MEX	Bernardo Hernández (loan return from Tampico Madero)

Out: Note: Flags indicate national team as defined under FIFA eligibility rules; some limited exceptions apply. Players may hold more than one non-FIFA nationality.

No.	Pos.	Nation	Player
4	DF	PAR	Iván Piris (on loan to León)
5	DF	URU	Walter Gargano (to (Uruguay) Peñarol)
9	FW	MEX	Aldo de Nigris (retired)
10	MF	COL	Edwin Cardona (on loan to (Argentina) Boca Juniors)
19	DF	MEX	Luis López (on loan to Juárez)
20	DF	ECU	Walter Ayoví (to (Ecuador) Guayaquil City)
22	GK	ECU	Alexander Domínguez (on loan to (Argentina) Colón)
23	FW	COL	Yimmi Chará (to (Colombia) Junior)
30	GK	MEX	Luis Cárdenas (on loan to Zacatepec)
34	FW	ARG	Jonatan Cristaldo (loan return to Cruz Azul)
87	MF	MEX	Obed Martínez (to (Spain) Toledo, previously on loan at Juárez)
90	FW	MEX	César Martínez (on loan to (Costa Rica) Guadalupe)
288	MF	MEX	Carlos Rodríguez (on loan to (Spain) Toledo)
—	GK	MEX	Juan de Dios Ibarra (retired, previously on loan at Puebla)
—	DF	MEX	Alejandro Berber (on loan to Juárez, previously on loan at Zacatepec)
—	DF	MEX	Dárvin Chávez (unattached, previously on loan at Veracruz)
—	DF	MEX	Alejandro García (on loan to Juárez, previously on loan at Oaxaca)
—	DF	MEX	Pierre Ibarra (unattached, previously on loan at UAT)
—	DF	MEX	Severo Meza (on loan to Tapachula, previously on loan at Necaxa)
—	DF	MEX	Héctor Morales (on loan to UAT, previously on loan at Tapachula)
—	DF	MEX	Carlos Ortega (to UdeC, previously on loan)
—	DF	BRA	Victor Ramos (on loan to (Brazil) Chapecoense, previously on loan at (Brazil) Vitória)
—	DF	MEX	Santiago Rivera (on loan to Durango, previously on loan at Tapachula)
—	DF	MEX	David Stringel (on loan to UAEM, previously on loan at Atlante)
—	MF	MEX	Gael Acosta (on loan to Oaxaca, previously on loan at UAT)
—	MF	MEX	Arturo Alvarado (on loan to Atlético San Luis, previously on loan at Zacatepec)
—	MF	PER	Pedro Aquino (on loan to BUAP, previously signed from (Peru) Sporting Cristal)
—	MF	MEX	Omar Arellano (unattached, previously on loan at Tampico Madero)
—	MF	MEX	César de la Peña (on loan to UAT, previously on loan at (Costa Rica) Belén)
—	MF	MEX	Marcelo Gracia (on loan to Atlante, previously on loan at Tlaxcala)
—	MF	MEX	Gerardo Moreno (on loan to Sonora, previously on loan at Tampico Madero)
—	MF	MEX	Marvin Piñón (unattached, previously on loan at UdeC)
—	FW	MEX	Othoniel Arce (on loan to Necaxa, previously on loan at Sonora)
—	FW	MEX	Julio Cruz (on loan to (Costa Rica) Herediano, previously on loan at (Costa Rica) Belén)
—	FW	MEX	Luis Madrigal (on loan to Oaxaca, previously on loan at Zacatecas)
—	FW	MEX	José Alberto Sánchez (unattached, previously on loan at Atlante)

=== Morelia ===
In: Note: Flags indicate national team as defined under FIFA eligibility rules; some limited exceptions apply. Players may hold more than one non-FIFA nationality.

No.	Pos.	Nation	Player
5	DF	MEX	Carlos Guzmán (loan return from León)
6	DF	CHI	Sebastián Vegas (from (Chile) Audax Italiano, previously on loan)
13	GK	URU	Sebastián Sosa (from Pachuca, previously on loan)
15	FW	MEX	Ángel Sepúlveda (from Querétaro)
26	MF	MEX	Aldo Rocha (from León, previously on loan)

Out: Note: Flags indicate national team as defined under FIFA eligibility rules; some limited exceptions apply. Players may hold more than one non-FIFA nationality.

No.	Pos.	Nation	Player
1	GK	MEX	Carlos Felipe Rodríguez (on loan to León)
5	DF	ARG	Facundo Erpen (loan return to Atlas)
6	MF	MEX	David Cabrera (loan return to UNAM)
14	MF	ECU	Cristian Penilla (loan return to Pachuca)
18	MF	COL	Luis Gabriel Rey (loan return to América)
28	DF	MEX	Carlos Adrián Morales (on loan to BUAP)
29	DF	MEX	Santiago Altamira (unattached)
30	DF	MEX	Ignacio González (on loan to Sinaloa)
289	FW	MEX	Édgar Huerta (on loan to Oaxaca)
295	FW	MEX	Claudio Zamudio (to Celaya)
—	GK	MEX	Cirilo Saucedo (unattached, previously on loan at Juárez)
—	DF	MEX	Joel Huiqui (on loan to UAEM)
—	MF	MEX	Víctor Guajardo (on loan to Sonora, previously on loan at Zacatepec)
—	MF	MEX	Luis Morales (on loan to Zacatecas, previously on loan at Tlaxcala)
—	MF	MEX	Luis Romero (unattached, previously on loan at Zacatepec)
—	MF	MEX	Hibert Ruíz (on loan to UdeG, previously on loan at Chiapas)
—	MF	MEX	Christian Valdez (on loan to Veracruz, previously on loan at León)
—	FW	MEX	Éver Guzmán (to (United States) San Antonio, previously on loan at UAT)
—	FW	MEX	Ulises Jaimes (on loan to Zacatepec, previously on loan at Tepic)
—	FW	MEX	Óscar Fernández (to (Guatemala) Deportivo Sanarate, previously on loan at Tampico Madero)
—	FW	CHI	Héctor Mancilla (retired, previously on loan at BUAP)
—	FW	COL	Yorleys Mena (on loan to (Colombia) Alianza Petrolera, previously on loan at (Colombia) América de Cali)

=== Necaxa ===
In: Note: Flags indicate national team as defined under FIFA eligibility rules; some limited exceptions apply. Players may hold more than one non-FIFA nationality.

No.	Pos.	Nation	Player
3	MF	CHI	Matías Fernández (from (Italy) Fiorentina, previously on loan at (Italy) Milan)
4	DF	MEX	Omar Hernández (loan return from (Costa Rica) Herediano)
5	DF	CHI	Igor Lichnovsky (from (Portugal) Porto, previously on loan at (Spain) Valladolid)
6	MF	MEX	Luis Pérez (loan return from BUAP)
7	MF	MEX	Daniel Álvarez (from Atlas)
9	FW	MEX	Martín Barragán (on loan from Atlas)
10	MF	MEX	Dieter Villalpando (on loan from Pachuca, previously on loan at Chiapas)
13	MF	MEX	Roberto Alvarado (from Pachuca)
15	MF	CHI	Víctor Dávila (from (Chile) Huachipato)
17	DF	MEX	Miguel Ponce (on loan from Guadalajara)
20	DF	MEX	Bryan Colula (on loan from América)
21	GK	MEX	Aarón Fernández (on loan from UANL)
22	DF	MEX	Edgar Alaffita (loan return from Sonora)
23	MF	ARG	Facundo Pereyra (on loan from (Greece) PAOK)
27	FW	MEX	Othoniel Arce (on loan from Monterrey, previously on loan at Sonora)
30	FW	PAR	Pablo Velázquez (on loan from Toluca, previously on loan at (Paraguay) Cerro Porteño)
32	FW	PAR	Carlos González (from (Chile) Huachipato)

Out: Note: Flags indicate national team as defined under FIFA eligibility rules; some limited exceptions apply. Players may hold more than one non-FIFA nationality.

No.	Pos.	Nation	Player
3	DF	CHI	Marcos González (to (Chile) Palestino)
4	DF	MEX	Jesús Chávez (loan return to Tijuana)
5	DF	URU	Emilio MacEachen (loan return to (Uruguay) Peñarol)
7	MF	MEX	Michel García (on loan to Tampico Madero)
9	MF	CHI	Nicolás Maturana (to (Chile) Colo-Colo)
15	MF	MEX	Jorge Sánchez (on loan to Atlético San Luis)
17	FW	MEX	Alejandro Díaz (loan return to América)
20	FW	ARG	Maxi Barreiro (to (Ecuador) Independiente del Valle)
21	FW	ARG	Fabián Espíndola (to (Spain) Albacete)
22	FW	CHI	Edson Puch (to Pachuca)
23	GK	MEX	Roberto Salcedo (on loan to Atlético San Luis)
24	MF	ARG	Jonás Aguirre (loan return to (Argentina) Rosario Central)
28	DF	MEX	Severo Meza (loan return to Monterrey)
102	MF	MEX	Rodrigo Cerrilla (to (Gibraltar) Mons Calpe)
—	GK	MEX	Alejandro Vences (on loan to UAEM, previously on loan at Oaxaca)
—	DF	MEX	Néstor Olguín (unattached, previously on loan at UAT)
—	DF	MEX	Carlos Ramos (on loan to Atlético San Luis, previously on loan at Zacatepec)
—	MF	CHI	Marcelo Allende (on loan to (Chile) Santa Cruz, previously signed)
—	MF	MEX	Rodolfo Espinoza (unattached, previously on loan at UdeC)
—	MF	MEX	Carlos Hurtado (on loan to Celaya, previously on loan at UAT)
—	MF	MEX	Juan Carlos Mosqueda (unattached, previously on loan at Veracruz)
—	MF	ESP	Lolo Plá (to (Spain) Elche, previously on loan at (Spain) Toledo)
—	FW	MEX	Kevin Chaurand (re-loan to Murciélagos)
—	FW	MEX	Rodrigo Prieto (on loan to Juárez, previously on loan at Zacatepec)

=== Pachuca ===
In: Note: Flags indicate national team as defined under FIFA eligibility rules; some limited exceptions apply. Players may hold more than one non-FIFA nationality.

No.	Pos.	Nation	Player
2	MF	JPN	Keisuke Honda (from (Italy) Milan)
7	FW	CHI	Ángelo Sagal (from (Chile) Huachipato)
9	FW	ARG	Germán Cano (loan return from León)
11	FW	CHI	Edson Puch (from Necaxa)
18	MF	MEX	Joaquín Martínez (loan return from Zacatecas)
26	DF	URU	Robert Herrera (from Puebla)
28	FW	MEX	Nahum Gómez (loan return from (Chile) Everton)

Out: Note: Flags indicate national team as defined under FIFA eligibility rules; some limited exceptions apply. Players may hold more than one non-FIFA nationality.

No.	Pos.	Nation	Player
7	FW	URU	Braian Rodríguez (unattached)
8	MF	MEX	Hirving Lozano (to (Netherlands) PSV)
9	FW	CHI	Sergio Vergara (on loan to Zacatecas)
22	GK	MEX	Alain Estrada (on loan to Murciélagos)
25	MF	MEX	Roberto Alvarado (to Necaxa)
28	GK	MEX	Rafael Ramírez (loan return to Zacatecas)
33	DF	COL	Stefan Medina (loan return to Monterrey)
—	GK	MEX	Sebastián Fassi (on loan to Zacatecas, previously on loan at Tlaxcala)
—	GK	URU	Sebastián Sosa (to Morelia, previously on loan)
—	DF	MEX	Miguel Herrera (on loan to León, previously on loan at Veracruz)
—	DF	MEX	Heriberto Olvera (on loan to BUAP, previously on loan to Zacatecas)
—	DF	MEX	Marco Pérez (to (Spain) Salmantino, previously on loan at BUAP)
—	DF	MEX	Hugo Rodríguez (on loan to Puebla, previously on loan at Zacatecas)
—	DF	MEX	Francisco Santillán (on loan to UAT, previously on loan at Tlaxcala)
—	DF	MEX	Abraham Torres Nilo (on loan to Zacatecas, previously on loan at UAEM)
—	MF	MEX	Ángel Bautista (on loan to Oaxaca, previously on loan at Tlaxcala)
—	MF	MEX	Juan Pablo Fassi (on loan to (Uruguay) Fénix, previously on loan at Puebla)
—	MF	MEX	Julio Gómez (on loan to Zacatepec, previously on loan at Tepic)
—	MF	MEX	Mauro Laínez (on loan to León, previously on loan at Zacatecas)
—	MF	COL	John Pajoy (on loan to (Colombia) Independiente Santa Fe, previously on loan at (Colombia) Atlético Bucaramanga)
—	MF	ECU	Cristian Penilla (on loan to (Brazil) Chapecoense, previously on loan at Morelia)
—	MF	MEX	David Ramírez (on loan to UAT, previously on loan at Celaya)
—	MF	MEX	Juan Carlos Silva (to (Guatemala) Deportivo Sanarate, previously on loan at UAT)
—	MF	MEX	Dieter Villalpando (on loan to Necaxa, previously on loan at Chiapas)
—	FW	MEX	Víctor Mañón (on loan to UdeC, previously on loan at Tlaxcala)
—	FW	MEX	Guillermo Martínez (on loan to Zacatecas, previously on loan at Guadalajara)
—	FW	COL	Wilson Morelo (on loan to (Colombia) Independiente Santa Fe, previously on loan at (Chile) Everton)
—	FW	ARG	Sebastián Palacios (on loan to (Argentina) Talleres de Córdoba, previously bought)

=== Puebla ===
In: Note: Flags indicate national team as defined under FIFA eligibility rules; some limited exceptions apply. Players may hold more than one non-FIFA nationality.

No.	Pos.	Nation	Player
2	DF	COL	Brayan Angulo (from (Bulgaria) Ludogorets Razgrad, previously on loan at Chiapas)
4	DF	MEX	Luis Venegas (from Chiapas)
7	MF	MEX	Alonso Escoboza (on loan from Tijuana, previously on loan at Chiapas)
10	DF	COL	Félix Micolta (from (Colombia) Independiente Medellín, previously on loan at Chiapas)
13	MF	COL	Christian Marrugo (from (Colombia) Independiente Medellín)
14	DF	MEX	Erik Pimentel (on loan from América)
17	DF	MEX	Alonso Zamora (on loan from UANL, previously on loan at Juárez)
19	FW	PLE	Carlos Salom (from (Chile) Unión Española)
21	MF	MEX	José Guerrero (on loan from América)
22	FW	CAN	Lucas Cavallini (on loan from (Uruguay) Peñarol)
23	GK	MEX	Moisés Muñoz (on loan from América, previously on loan at Chiapas)
24	MF	ARG	Jonás Aguirre (on loan from (Argentina) Rosario Central, previously on loan at Necaxa)
27	DF	MEX	Hugo Rodríguez (on loan from Pachuca, previously on loan at Zacatecas)
31	DF	COL	Jhon Mondragón (from (Spain) Osasuna B)

Out: Note: Flags indicate national team as defined under FIFA eligibility rules; some limited exceptions apply. Players may hold more than one non-FIFA nationality.

No.	Pos.	Nation	Player
2	DF	URU	Robert Herrera (to Pachuca)
4	DF	ARG	Iván Centurión (to (Argentina) Aldosivi)
5	DF	MEX	Édgar Dueñas (loan return to Toluca)
7	FW	MEX	Emilio Orrantía (loan return to Santos Laguna)
10	MF	URU	Gonzalo Ramos (to (Uruguay) Fénix)
11	FW	ARG	Federico González (loan return to (Argentina) Tigre)
14	MF	MEX	Juan Pablo Fassi (loan return to Pachuca)
17	GK	ARG	Cristian Campestrini (to (Argentina) Chacarita Juniors)
18	FW	MEX	Eduardo Pérez (on loan to Tapachula)
20	FW	URU	Álvaro Navarro (unattached)
21	DF	MEX	Adrián Cortés (unattached)
22	FW	ARG	Juan Mare (loan return to Atlas)
23	GK	MEX	Juan de Dios Ibarra (loan return to Monterrey)
25	FW	ARG	Alexis Canelo (to Toluca)
26	DF	ARG	Damián Schmidt (on loan to (Argentina) San Martín de San Juan)
29	MF	COL	Carlos Rodríguez (unattached)
32	DF	ARG	Claudio Pérez (to (Argentina) Flandria)
—	GK	MEX	Erick Gil (unattached, previously on loan at Tepic)
—	DF	MEX	Roberto Juárez (on loan to UdeG, previously on loan at (Panama) Alianza)
—	DF	MEX	Sergio Pérez (retired, previously on loan at Venados)
—	MF	MEX	Christian Bermúdez (on loan to Tapachula, previously signed from Chiapas)
—	MF	MEX	Juan Carlos García (unattached, previously on loan at Venados)
—	MF	MEX	Luis Ángel Mendoza (on loan to Tijuana, previously signed from Chiapas)
—	MF	MEX	César Villaluz (to (Spain) Cacereño, previously on loan at Celaya)
—	FW	MEX	Gustavo Anzaldo (unattached, previously on loan at Venados)
—	FW	MEX	Darío Carreño (unattached, previously on loan at Sonora)
—	FW	MEX	Alberto Medina (unattached, previously on loan at Tepic)
—	FW	MEX	José Rodolfo Reyes (unattached, previously on loan at UAT)
—	FW	MEX	Mauricio Romero (unattached, previously on loan at Zacatepec)

=== Querétaro ===
In: Note: Flags indicate national team as defined under FIFA eligibility rules; some limited exceptions apply. Players may hold more than one non-FIFA nationality.

No.	Pos.	Nation	Player
5	DF	MEX	Víctor Milke (loan return from Sonora)
6	MF	MEX	Javier Güémez (from América)
9	FW	BRA	Everaldo (from (Brazil) Atlético Goianiense)
15	DF	MEX	Juan de Alba (loan return from Sonora)
25	DF	COL	Alexis Pérez (from (Colombia) Junior)
26	MF	MEX	Erbín Trejo (from Toluca)

Out: Note: Flags indicate national team as defined under FIFA eligibility rules; some limited exceptions apply. Players may hold more than one non-FIFA nationality.

No.	Pos.	Nation	Player
4	DF	MEX	Dionicio Escalante (to (Spain) Unión Adarve)
6	DF	ARG	Juan Forlín (to (Spain) Oviedo)
11	FW	COL	Andrés Rentería (on loan to (Colombia) Atlético Nacional)
15	FW	MEX	Ángel Sepúlveda (to Morelia)
16	MF	MEX	Kevin Gutiérrez (on loan to Sinaloa)
23	GK	MEX	Édgar Hernández (on loan to Oaxaca)
29	MF	ARG	Neri Cardozo (loan return to Monterrey)
81	DF	MEX	Luis Romo (on loan to Sonora)
84	DF	MEX	Areli Hernández (on loan to Sonora)
93	DF	MEX	Martín Orozco (on loan to UAT)
—	GK	MEX	Luis Manuel García (to Toluca, previously on loan)
—	GK	MEX	Darío Romo (on loan to UAT, previously on loan at Murciélagos)
—	GK	MEX	Liborio Sánchez (on loan to (Colombia) Alianza Petrolera, previously on loan at Tapachula)
—	DF	MEX	Jorge Echavarría (on loan to Zacatepec, previously on loan at Tepic)
—	MF	MEX	Jorge Gastélum (unattached, previously on loan at Sonora)
—	MF	MEX	Juan Carlos López (on loan to Oaxaca, previously on loan at (Nicaragua) Real Estelí)
—	MF	MEX	Guillermo Rojas (unattached, previously on loan at Tapachula)
—	MF	MEX	Alan Zamora (on loan to Atlante)
—	FW	MEX	Luis González (unattached, previously on loan at Tepic)
—	FW	MEX	Luis Loroña (on loan to UAT, previously on loan at Sonora)
—	FW	MEX	Isaac Romo (unattached, previously on loan at UdeG)
—	FW	CHI	Patricio Rubio (on loan to (Chile) Everton, previously on loan at Sinaloa)
—	FW	MEX	Emmanuel Tapia (to (Guatemala) Suchitepéquez)

=== Santos Laguna ===
In: Note: Flags indicate national team as defined under FIFA eligibility rules; some limited exceptions apply. Players may hold more than one non-FIFA nationality.

No.	Pos.	Nation	Player
15	MF	URU	Brian Lozano (on loan from América, previously on loan at (Uruguay) Nacional)
27	MF	MEX	Javier Cortés (from UNAM)

Out: Note: Flags indicate national team as defined under FIFA eligibility rules; some limited exceptions apply. Players may hold more than one non-FIFA nationality.

No.	Pos.	Nation	Player
4	DF	COL	Juan Caicedo (on loan to Tampico Madero)
5	DF	MEX	César Ibáñez (on loan to Atlético San Luis)
8	MF	COL	Mauricio Cuero (on loan to Tijuana)
20	DF	COL	Andrés Murillo (loan return to (Colombia) La Equidad)
32	GK	MEX	Julio González (on loan to Tampico Madero)
90	MF	MEX	Uriel Antuna (to (England) Manchester City)
296	FW	MEX	Eduardo Aguirre (on loan to Tampico Madero)
297	FW	MEX	Joao Maleck (on loan to (Portugal) Porto)
298	MF	MEX	Kevin Lara (on loan to Tampico Madero)
—	DF	MEX	Kenyi Adachi (to (Spain) Real Burgos, previously on loan at Cancún)
—	DF	MEX	Uriel Álvarez (unattached, previously on loan at Tampico Madero)
—	DF	MEX	Emilio Orrantía (on loan to América, previously on loan at Puebla)
—	DF	MEX	Christian Tovar (on loan to Tampico Madero, previously on loan at Oaxaca)
—	MF	MEX	Néstor Calderón (to UNAM, previously on loan at Guadalajara)
—	MF	URU	Ribair Rodríguez (to (Uruguay) Danubio, previously on loan at UdeG)
—	FW	HON	Júnior Lacayo (on loan to (Honduras) Marathón, previously on loan at Tampico Madero)
—	FW	MEX	Javier Orozco (on loan to Tampico Madero, previously on loan at Veracruz)

=== Tijuana ===
In: Note: Flags indicate national team as defined under FIFA eligibility rules; some limited exceptions apply. Players may hold more than one non-FIFA nationality.

No.	Pos.	Nation	Player
2	DF	ARG	Alejandro Donatti (from (Brazil) Flamengo)
4	GK	MEX	José Antonio Rodríguez (on loan from Guadalajara, previously on loan at León)
5	MF	ARG	Damián Musto (from (Argentina) Rosario Central)
7	FW	ARG	Gustavo Bou (from (Argentina) Racing)
13	DF	URU	Matías Aguirregaray (from (Argentina) Estudiantes)
17	MF	COL	Mauricio Cuero (on loan from Santos Laguna)
18	FW	PAR	Juan Iturbe (on loan from (Italy) Roma, previously on loan at (Italy) Torino)
21	MF	ARG	Enzo Kalinski (on loan from (Chile) Universidad Católica)
26	MF	MEX	Luis Ángel Mendoza (on loan from Puebla, previously signed from Chiapas)
32	FW	ECU	Miller Bolaños (on loan from (Brazil) Grêmio)
98	DF	MEX	Mario Quezada (on loan from Toluca, previously on loan at BUAP)

Out: Note: Flags indicate national team as defined under FIFA eligibility rules; some limited exceptions apply. Players may hold more than one non-FIFA nationality.

No.	Pos.	Nation	Player
2	DF	USA	John Requejo (on loan to Sinaloa)
5	MF	ARG	Guido Rodríguez (to América)
9	FW	ARG	Milton Caraglio (to Atlas)
12	GK	MEX	Dilan Nicoletti (unattached)
18	FW	COL	Avilés Hurtado (to Monterrey)
20	MF	USA	Paul Arriola (to (United States) D.C. United)
26	MF	MEX	Juan Carlos Medina (loan return to Atlas)
28	FW	USA	Amando Moreno (on loan to Sinaloa)
29	GK	MEX	Luis Ernesto Michel (loan return to Sinaloa)
32	MF	ARG	Jorge Ortiz (loan return to (Argentina) Independiente)
88	DF	MEX	Carlos Vargas (to América)
291	MF	MEX	Miguel Moreno (to Celaya)
—	DF	MEX	Joshua Abrego (unattached, previously on loan at Murciélagos)
—	DF	MEX	Jesús Chávez (on loan to Sinaloa, previously on loan at Necaxa)
—	DF	MEX	Miguel Garduño (unattached, previously on loan at Venados)
—	DF	MEX	Luis Trujillo (on loan to Tuxtla, previously on loan at Sinaloa)
—	MF	MEX	José María Cárdenas (unattached, previously on loan at Sinaloa)
—	MF	MEX	Adolfo Domínguez (on loan to Tapachula)
—	MF	MEX	Alonso Escoboza (on loan to Puebla, previously on loan at Chiapas)
—	MF	MEX	Germán Ramírez (on loan to (El Salvador) Isidro Metapán, previously on loan at Saltillo)
—	FW	CHI	Felipe Flores (unattached, previously on loan at Veracruz)
—	FW	MEX	Alberto García (on loan to Tapachula, previously on loan at Sinaloa)
—	FW	MEX	Leonel Pérez (unattached, previously on loan at Sinaloa)

=== Toluca ===
In: Note: Flags indicate national team as defined under FIFA eligibility rules; some limited exceptions apply. Players may hold more than one non-FIFA nationality.

No.	Pos.	Nation	Player
3	DF	ARG	Santiago García (from (Germany) Werder Bremen)
4	DF	URU	Maximiliano Perg (from (Uruguay) Peñarol)
16	GK	MEX	Miguel Centeno (loan return from UAT)
17	FW	BRA	Mateus Gonçalves (on loan from Zacatepec, previously on loan at Chiapas)
18	MF	USA	Rodrigo López (on loan from Celaya)
22	GK	MEX	Luis Manuel García (from Querétaro, previously on loan)
25	FW	ARG	Alexis Canelo (from Chiapas, previously on loan at Puebla)
26	DF	MEX	Jesús García (on loan from Cruz Azul)

Out: Note: Flags indicate national team as defined under FIFA eligibility rules; some limited exceptions apply. Players may hold more than one non-FIFA nationality.

No.	Pos.	Nation	Player
3	DF	MEX	Aarón Galindo (to (Spain) Toledo)
4	DF	PAR	Paulo da Silva (to (Paraguay) Libertad)
8	FW	BRA	Maikon Leite (to (Brazil) Bahia)
10	MF	MEX	Sinha (retired)
14	FW	ENG	Antonio Pedroza (end of contract)
21	FW	ARG	Enrique Triverio (to (Argentina) Racing)
23	DF	MEX	Jordan Silva (to Cruz Azul)
26	MF	MEX	Erbín Trejo (to Querétaro)
—	DF	MEX	Héctor Acosta (on loan to Atlético San Luis, previously on loan at Venados)
—	DF	MEX	Édgar Dueñas (on loan to UAEM, previously on loan at Puebla)
—	DF	MEX	Christian Pérez (on loan to Tapachula)
—	DF	MEX	Mario Quezada (on loan to Tijuana, previously on loan at BUAP)
—	MF	MEX	Diego Aguilar (on loan to Atlante, previously on loan at BUAP)
—	MF	ARG	Darío Bottinelli (on loan to (Colombia) América de Cali, previously on loan at (Argentina) Gimnasia)
—	MF	MEX	Juan Calderón (unattached, previously on loan at Venados)
—	MF	MEX	Gabriel Velasco (unattached, previously on loan at UAEM)
—	FW	MEX	Daniel González (on loan to UAEM)
—	FW	COL	Wilder Guisao (unattached, previously on loan at Chiapas)
—	FW	PAR	Pablo Velázquez (on loan to Necaxa, previously on loan at (Paraguay) Cerro Porteño)

=== UANL ===
In: Note: Flags indicate national team as defined under FIFA eligibility rules; some limited exceptions apply. Players may hold more than one non-FIFA nationality.

No.	Pos.	Nation	Player
5	MF	BRA	Rafael Carioca (from (Brazil) Atlético Mineiro)
13	FW	ECU	Enner Valencia (from (England) West Ham United, previously on loan at (England) Everton)
15	DF	FRA	Timothée Kolodziejczak (from (Germany) Borussia Mönchengladbach)
19	MF	COL	Larry Vásquez (from (Colombia) Patriotas Boyacá)
36	GK	MEX	Lalo Fernández (from (United States) Real Salt Lake)
303	FW	MEX	Luis Cruz (loan return from Zacatepec)

Out: Note: Flags indicate national team as defined under FIFA eligibility rules; some limited exceptions apply. Players may hold more than one non-FIFA nationality.

No.	Pos.	Nation	Player
15	MF	MEX	Manuel Viniegra (on loan to Veracruz)
16	DF	PER	Luis Advíncula (on loan to BUAP)
19	MF	ARG	Guido Pizarro (to (Spain) Sevilla)
23	MF	COL	Luis Quiñones (unattached, previously on loan at BUAP)
24	DF	MEX	José Rivas (on loan to Veracruz)
30	GK	MEX	Aarón Fernández (on loan to Necaxa)
32	FW	COL	Brayan Lucumí (on loan to (Colombia) Deportivo Pasto)
33	FW	COL	Julián Quiñones (on loan to BUAP)
34	MF	MEX	Jonathan Espericueta (on loan to Atlético San Luis)
—	GK	USA	Austin Guerrero (unattached, previously on loan at (Panama) Alianza)
—	GK	MEX	Richard Sánchez (to (United States) Chicago Fire, previously on loan at Tampico Madero)
—	GK	MEX	Daniel Vogel (unattached, previously on loan at UAT)
—	DF	MEX	Antonio Briseño (to (Portugal) Feirense, previously on loan at Veracruz)
—	DF	MEX	Ricardo Chávez (on loan to Sonora, previously on loan at UAT)
—	DF	MEX	Nicolás Ruvalcaba (retired, previously on loan at BUAP)
—	DF	MEX	Marco Tovar (unattached, previously on loan at Murciélagos)
—	DF	MEX	Dieter Vargas (on loan to UAEM, previously on loan at Oaxaca)
—	DF	MEX	Alonso Zamora (on loan to Puebla, previously on loan at Juárez)
—	MF	MEX	Genaro Castillo (on loan to Tuxtla, previously on loan at Tampico Madero)
—	MF	MEX	Uvaldo Luna (on loan to Atlas, previously on loan at (Colombia) Patriotas Boyacá)
—	MF	MEX	Jesús Ortega (on loan to Matamoros, previously on loan at Zacatepec)
—	MF	COL	William Palacios (to (Argentina) Aldosivi previously on loan at BUAP and (Peru) Comerciantes Unidos)
—	MF	MEX	Emmanuel Segura (on loan to Juárez, previously on loan at Oaxaca)
—	MF	MEX	Alfonso Tamay (on loan to BUAP, previously on loan at Oaxaca)
—	MF	MEX	Hilario Tristán (on loan to Sonora, previously on loan at Murciélagos)
—	FW	MEX	Emmanuel Cerda (unattached, previously on loan at UAEM)
—	FW	MEX	Gerardo Escobedo (on loan to Atlético San Luis, previously on loan at Athletic Morelos)
—	FW	MEX	Enrique Esqueda (unattached, previously on loan at Chiapas)
—	FW	PAR	Fernando Fernández (on loan to (Colombia) América de Cali, previously on loan at (Paraguay) Olimpia)
—	FW	COL	Carlos Rivas (on loan to UAT, previously on loan at (Colombia) Jaguares de Córdoba)

=== UNAM ===
In: Note: Flags indicate national team as defined under FIFA eligibility rules; some limited exceptions apply. Players may hold more than one non-FIFA nationality.

No.	Pos.	Nation	Player
7	MF	MEX	David Cabrera (loan return from Morelia)
9	FW	ECU	Joffre Guerrón (from Cruz Azul)
21	DF	MEX	Rodrigo González (loan return from Venados)
23	MF	CHI	Marcelo Díaz (from (Spain) Celta)
29	MF	MEX	Néstor Calderón (from Santos Laguna, previously on loan at Guadalajara)
33	MF	ARG	Mauro Formica (from Cruz Azul, previously on loan at (Argentina) Newell's Old Boys)

Out: Note: Flags indicate national team as defined under FIFA eligibility rules; some limited exceptions apply. Players may hold more than one non-FIFA nationality.

No.	Pos.	Nation	Player
1	GK	MEX	Alejandro Palacios (on loan to Atlético San Luis)
4	DF	PAR	Darío Verón (to (Paraguay) Olimpia)
7	MF	MEX	Javier Cortés (to Santos Laguna)
14	MF	MEX	Jorge Escamilla (on loan to Venados)
15	DF	MEX	Érik Vera (on loan to Atlético San Luis)
20	FW	URU	Matías Britos (to (Saudi Arabia) Al-Hilal)
21	MF	MEX	Alejandro Castro (on loan to Atlético San Luis)
24	FW	MEX	Santiago Palacios-Macedo (on loan to Atlético San Luis)
35	MF	ARG	Franco Faría (on loan to Venados)
91	GK	MEX	Alejandro Arana (to (Spain) Toledo B, previously on loan from Zacatepec)
96	FW	MEX	David Martínez (on loan to Venados)
294	MF	MEX	Gustavo Rodríguez (on loan to Atlético San Luis)
299	MF	MEX	Andrés Iniestra (on loan to Venados)
301	FW	MEX	Omar Islas (on loan to Venados)
302	DF	ESP	Lauren Egea (on loan to Zacatepec)
—	GK	MEX	Odín Patiño (unattached, previously on loan at Venados)
—	DF	MEX	Marcelo Alatorre (on loan to Venados, previously on loan at Veracruz)
—	DF	MEX	Orlando Pineda (on loan to Oaxaca)
—	DF	MEX	Neftalí Teja (unattached, previously on loan at Oaxaca)
—	MF	MEX	Fernando Espinosa (unattached, previously on loan at Atlante)
—	MF	MEX	José Antonio Medina (on loan to Venados, previously on loan at Atlante)
—	MF	MEX	Miguel Rebollo (on loan to (Spain) Real Burgos, previously on loan at Zacatepec)
—	FW	MEX	Eduardo Herrera (to (Scotland) Rangers, previously on loan at Veracruz)
—	FW	MEX	David Izazola (to Atlante, previously on loan at (Guatemala) Comunicaciones)
—	FW	MEX	Alfonso Nieto (unattached, previously on loan at (Costa Rica) Herediano)
—	FW	URU	Jonathan Ramis (on loan to (Argentina) Belgrano, previously on loan at Zacatepec)

=== Veracruz ===
In: Note: Flags indicate national team as defined under FIFA eligibility rules; some limited exceptions apply. Players may hold more than one non-FIFA nationality.

No.	Pos.	Nation	Player
4	DF	VEN	José Manuel Velázquez (from (Portugal) Arouca)
5	DF	ARG	Guido Milán (from (France) Metz)
8	MF	MEX	Manuel Viniegra (on loan from UANL)
10	FW	ARG	Daniel Villalva (re-signed)
11	FW	ARG	Cristian Menéndez (from (Argentina) Atlético Tucumán)
14	MF	ARG	Cristian Pellerano (re-loan from América)
15	MF	MEX	Giovani Hernández (on loan from Guadalajara, previously on loan at Tepic)
18	DF	MEX	Osmar Mares (on loan from América)
22	MF	MEX	Diego Chávez (loan return from Juárez)
23	MF	MEX	Richard Ruíz (on loan from Cruz Azul)
24	DF	MEX	José Rivas (on loan from UANL)
25	FW	ARG	Rodrigo Holgado (from Orizaba)
26	MF	MEX	Christian Valdez (on loan from Morelia, previously on loan at León)
30	FW	ARG	Leandro Díaz (from (Argentina) Atlético de Rafaela)
31	MF	URU	Matías Santos (from (Uruguay) Montevideo Wanderers)
32	MF	GHA	Geoffrey Acheampong (from (France) Bastia)
33	GK	MEX	Sergio García (loan return from UdeG)
102	FW	MEX	Omar Marrufo (from Atlante, previously on loan at BUAP)

Out: Note: Flags indicate national team as defined under FIFA eligibility rules; some limited exceptions apply. Players may hold more than one non-FIFA nationality.

No.	Pos.	Nation	Player
2	DF	MEX	Marcelo Alatorre (loan return to UNAM)
4	DF	MEX	Antonio Briseño (loan return to UANL)
5	MF	ARG	Cristian Erbes (to (Argentina) Chacarita Juniors)
8	MF	MEX	Ángel Reyna (loan return to Celaya)
10	FW	URU	Juan Albín (unattached, previously on loan at (Romania) Dinamo București)
12	MF	COL	José David Leudo (on loan to (Colombia) Atlético Huila)
15	FW	MEX	Eduardo Herrera (loan return to UNAM)
17	MF	URU	Egidio Arévalo Ríos (to (Argentina) Racing)
19	DF	ARG	Matías Cahais (to (Argentina) Olimpo)
22	FW	CHI	Felipe Flores (loan return to Tijuana)
23	DF	MEX	Leobardo López (on loan to Celaya)
24	DF	ARG	Rodrigo Noya (on loan to Oaxaca)
25	MF	MEX	Jehu Chiapas (unattached)
26	MF	COL	Luis Díaz (to (Colombia) Orsomarso)
27	FW	ARG	Agustín Vuletich (to (Colombia) Rionegro Águilas)
31	FW	MEX	Diego Bartolotta (loan return to (Malta) Birkirkara)
32	MF	COL	Carlos Ibargüen (unattached)
33	FW	MEX	Javier Orozco (loan return to Santos Laguna)
34	GK	ARG	Luis Ojeda (to (Japan) JEF United Chiba)
35	MF	MEX	Juan Carlos Mosqueda (loan return to Necaxa)
36	DF	MEX	Dárvin Chávez (loan return to Monterrey)
37	DF	MEX	Miguel Herrera (loan return to Pachuca)
—	GK	MEX	Evo Rocchi (to (Gibraltar) Mons Calpe)
—	DF	MEX	Marco Figueroa (unattached, previously on loan at UAEM)
—	FW	MEX	Norman Chávez (on loan to UAEM, previously on loan at Orizaba)
—	FW	MEX	Kevin Favela (on loan to Celaya, previously on loan at Irapuato)

== Notes ==
- Denotes end of a player's contract, however remaining attached to a club if transferring within the Mexico football league system due to the pacto de caballeros (gentlemen's pact) policy that Mexican league owners follow.
