= Ricardo Peña =

Ricardo Peña may refer to:

- Ricardo Felipe Pena (Dominican Crypto Currency CEO)
- Ricardo Peña (Mexican footballer)
- Ricardo Peña (Costa Rican footballer)
- Ricardo Peña (cyclist)
