= Uscanga =

Uscanga is a surname. Notable people with the surname include:

- Jorge Uscanga (born 1944), Mexican politician
- Óscar Uscanga (born 1990), Mexican footballer
- Paúl Uscanga (born 1991), Mexican footballer
- Robinson Uscanga Cruz (born 1953), Mexican politician
