= Éder López =

Éder López may refer to:

- Éder López (footballer, born 2006), Mexican footballer

Lopes:

- Éder Lopes (born 1965), Brazilian footballer
