= Wilber Rentería =

Colombian footballer (born 1992)

Wilber Renteria
Personal information
- Full name: Wilber Renteria Cuero
- Date of birth: 6 February 1992 (age 34)
- Place of birth: Valle del Cauca, Colombia
- Height: 1.79 m (5 ft 10 in)
- Position: Midfielder

Senior career*
Years	Team	Apps	(Gls)
2011	Deportes Quindío	1	(0)
2012	Universitario Popayán	9	(1)
2014–2015	Ocelotes UNACH	18	(7)
2015–2016	Potros UAEM	54	(19)
2017	Zacatepec	8	(0)
2017	Cimarrones de Sonora	9	(0)
2018–2019	Atlante	45	(4)
2019–2021	Correcaminos UAT	25	(6)
2021–2023	UdeG	16	(4)
2023-2024	Xelajú	27	(5)
- * Club domestic league appearances and goals as of 29 January 2022

Wilber Renteria Cuero (born 6 February 1992) is a professional Colombian footballer.
