= André Aguilar =

Mexican footballer (born 1997)

Personal information
- Full name: André David Aguilar Guevara
- Date of birth: 30 August 1997 (age 29)
- Place of birth: Monterrey, Nuevo León, Mexico
- Height: 1.79 m (5 ft 10 in)
- Position: Midfielder

Senior career*
Years	Team	Apps	(Gls)
2017–2019	Monterrey	0	(0)
2018	→ Pacific (loan)	7	(0)
2018	→ Murciélagos (loan)	6	(0)
2018–2019	→ Atlético Reynosa (loan)	3	(0)
2019–2020	Salamanca B	23	(1)
2020	Salamanca CF	0	(0)
- * Club domestic league appearances and goals as of 20:20, 31 July 2020 (UTC)

André David Aguilar Guevara (born August 30, 1997) is a Mexican footballer who plays as a midfielder for the reserve team of Spanish club Salamanca CF.
