= Pedro Vargas (footballer) =

Mexican footballer (born 1991)

Personal information
- Full name: Pedro Gilberto Vargas Moreno
- Date of birth: 20 November 1991 (age 34)
- Place of birth: Matamoros, Tamaulipas, Mexico
- Height: 1.67 m (5 ft 6 in)
- Position: Midfielder

Youth career
- 2007–2008: Ciudad Madero
- 2009–2011: Ébano F.C.
- 2012: San Luis Potosí

Senior career*
Years	Team	Apps	(Gls)
2012–2013	Tampico Madero	26	(3)
2013–2015	Altamira	62	(2)
2015–2017	Cafetaleros	21	(0)
2015	→ Chiapas (loan)	12	(0)
2017	→ Pioneros Cancún (loan)	15	(2)
2018–2019	Tampico Madero	35	(0)
2019–2020	Atlante	11	(0)
2021–2022	Fernández Vial	9	(0)
- * Club domestic league appearances and goals as of 8 July 2022

Pedro Gilberto Vargas Moreno (Note: In this Spanish name, the first or paternal surname is Vargas and the second or maternal family name is Moreno.) (born 20 November 1991) is a Mexican professional footballer who last played for Fernández Vial in the Primera B de Chile.

== Career ==
In September 2021, Vargas moved to Chile and joined Fernández Vial in the Primera B. In July 2022, he left the club having made nine appearances.
