= Fernando Herrera (Mexican footballer) =

Mexican footballer (born 1985)

Personal information
- Full name: Fernando Herrera Espinoza
- Date of birth: 4 July 1985 (age 41)
- Place of birth: Mexico City, Mexico
- Height: 1.63 m (5 ft 4 in)
- Position: Midfielder

Senior career*
Years	Team	Apps	(Gls)
2006–2007	Pegaso Real de Colima	18	(2)
2008	Potros Chetumal	6	(1)
2009–2017	Atlante	103	(1)
2012–2013	→ Mérida (loan)	18	(0)
2013–2014	→ Altamira (loan)	11	(0)
2018	Tampico Madero	19	(0)
2019	Potros UAEM	5	(0)
2020	Toros Neza	0	(0)
- * Club domestic league appearances and goals as of 18 September 2018

Fernando Herrera Espinoza (born July 4, 1985) is a former Mexican football midfielder. He last played for Potros UAEM.

== Career ==
Herrera broke into the Atlante first team on October 13, 2007, in a 2–1 loss to CF Pachuca. He had been promoted to the first squad by manager José Guadalupe Cruz, who noticed his playing ability at Atlante's filial team, Pegaso Real de Colima.

== Honors ==
=== Club ===
Atlante F.C.

- (Mexico) Apertura 2007
