= Jonathan Miramontes =

Mexican footballer (born 1988)

Jonathan Jair Miramontes Aguilar (born October 17, 1988) is a Mexican former professional footballer who played as a midfielder. After his retirement as a professional, he played for amateur club Transportes Salamanca.
