= Óscar Bernal =

Mexican footballer (born 1995)

Oscar Bernal
Personal information
- Full name: Oscar Antonio Bernal López
- Date of birth: 28 September 1995 (age 31)
- Place of birth: Ciudad Juárez, Chihuahua, Mexico
- Height: 1.74 m (5 ft 9 in)
- Position: Defender

Youth career
- 2011–2012: Indios
- 2012–2016: Santos Laguna

Senior career*
Years	Team	Apps	(Gls)
2012	Club Calor	9	(0)
2016–2019	Santos Laguna	1	(0)
2016–2017	→ Tampico Madero (loan)	38	(0)
2018–2019	→ La Equidad (loan)	18	(0)
2020	UACH	3	(0)
- * Club domestic league appearances and goals as of December 31, 2020

Óscar Antonio Bernal López (born September 28, 1995), known as Óscar Bernal, is a Mexican professional football player who last played for La Equidad on loan from Santos Laguna.

== Honours ==
=== International – Mexico U20 ===
- CONCACAF U-20 Championship: 2015
