= Guillermo Pozos =

Mexican footballer (born 1992)

Personal information
- Full name: Guillermo Pozos Guevara
- Date of birth: 7 July 1992 (age 34)
- Place of birth: Acapulco, Guerrero, Mexico
- Height: 1.80 m (5 ft 11 in)
- Position: Goalkeeper

Youth career
- 2008–2009: Monarcas Zacapu
- 2009–2010: Santos Laguna
- 2011–2012: Monarcas Morelia

Senior career*
Years	Team	Apps	(Gls)
2013	Pumas Morelos	0	(0)
2013–2014	Atlético Coatzacoalcos	45	(0)
2015	Reynosa	14	(0)
2015–2017	Celaya	32	(0)
2017	→ Irapuato (loan)	14	(0)
2018	Murciélagos	5	(0)
2018–2021	León	0	(0)
2021	UAT	7	(0)
- * Club domestic league appearances and goals

Guillermo Pozos Guevara (born 7 July 1992) is a Mexican former professional footballer who played as a goalkeeper.

== Honours ==
León

- Liga MX: Guardianes 2020
