= Francisco Santillán =

Mexican football player (born 1992)

Personal information
- Full name: Francisco Javier Santillán Morales
- Date of birth: 6 February 1992 (age 34)
- Place of birth: Guadalajara, Jalisco, Mexico
- Height: 1.79 m (5 ft 10 in)
- Position: Centre-back

Youth career
- 2008–2012: Pachuca

Senior career*
Years	Team	Apps	(Gls)
2012–2013	Murciélagos	18	(1)
2013–2017	Tlaxcala	104	(8)
2017–2018	UAT	3	(0)
2018–2019	Zacatecas	14	(0)
2019	Monagas	8	(0)
2020	Tlaxcala	3	(0)
2020	Chapulineros	0	(0)
2021–2025	Tlaxcala	26	(1)
- * Club domestic league appearances and goals as of 24 April 2022

Francisco Javier Santillán Morales (born 6 February 1992) is a Mexican professional footballer who plays as a centre-back for Tlaxcala.

== Career ==
=== Club career ===
After a spell in Venezuela with Monagas, Santillán returned to Tlaxcala FC in January 2020.

== Honours ==
Chapulineros de Oaxaca

- Liga de Balompié Mexicano: 2020–21
