= Javier Que =

Mexican footballer (born 1995)

Personal information
- Full name: Javier del Jesús Que Delgado
- Date of birth: 6 May 1995 (age 31)
- Place of birth: Campeche City, Campeche, Mexico
- Height: 1.76 m (5 ft 9 in)
- Position: Forward

Youth career
- 2010–2013: Corsarios de Campeche

Senior career*
Years	Team	Apps	(Gls)
2016	Santos Laguna	12	(0)
2016–2017	→ Tampico Madero (loan)	18	(1)
2017–2018	Tuxtla	19	(9)
2018–2019	U. de C.	13	(1)
2019–2020	Durango	19	(4)
- * Club domestic league appearances and goals as of 6 July 2019

Javier del Jesús Que Delgado (born May 6, 1995) is a Mexican professional footballer.
