= Éder López (footballer, born 2006) =

Mexican footballer (born 2006)

Personal information
- Full name: Éder López Castro
- Date of birth: 1 January 2006 (age 20)
- Place of birth: Cajeme, Sonora, Mexico
- Height: 1.75 m (5 ft 9 in)
- Positions: Defensive midfielder; centre-back

Team information
- Current team: Juárez
- Number: 14

Youth career
- 2019: Sonora
- 2022–: Juárez

Senior career*
Years	Team	Apps	(Gls)
2024–	Juárez	28	(0)
- * Club domestic league appearances and goals as of 6 November 2026

Éder López Castro (born 1 January 2006) is a Mexican professional footballer who plays as a defensive midfielder and as a centre-back for Liga MX club Juárez.

== Club career ==
López began his career at the academy of Sonora before moving to Juárez's academy, where he made his professional debut on 13 July 2024 against Toluca, being subbed in at the 86th minute of a 2–3 loss. On 16 December 2024, he signed a contract extension with Juárez.

== Career statistics ==
=== Club ===
As of match played on 6 November 2026

Club	Season	League			Cup		Continental		Intercontinental		Other		Total	
Club	Season	Division	Apps	Goals	Apps	Goals	Apps	Goals	Apps	Goals	Apps	Goals	Apps	Goals
Juárez	2024–25	Liga MX	12	0	—		—		—		—		12	0
Juárez	2025–26	Liga MX	9	0	—		—		—		1 (Note: Appearances in Leagues Cup)	0	10	0
Juárez	2026–27	Liga MX	7	0	—		—		—		—		7	0
Career total			28	0	0	0	0	0	0	0	1	0	29	0
