= Manuel Marroquín =

Mexican footballer (born 1993)

Personal information
- Full name: Manuel Marroquín López
- Date of birth: 25 October 1993 (age 33)
- Place of birth: Bochil, Chiapas, Mexico
- Height: 1.76 m (5 ft 9 in)
- Position: Defender

Youth career
- 2008–2010: Jaguares de Tabasco
- 2010–2013: Atlante

Senior career*
Years	Team	Apps	(Gls)
2013–2018	Atlante	79	(3)
2018	→ Dorados de Sinaloa (loan)	3	(0)
2018–2019	Coras de Nayarit	30	(3)
2019	Alebrijes de Oaxaca	0	(0)
- * Club domestic league appearances and goals

Manuel Marroquín López (born October 25, 1993) is a Mexican professional footballer.
