= Juan Pablo Meza =

Mexican footballer (born 1993)

Personal information
- Full name: Juan Pablo Meza Tepezano
- Date of birth: 13 August 1993 (age 33)
- Place of birth: Culiacán, Sinaloa, Mexico
- Height: 1.77 m (5 ft 10 in)
- Position: Defender

Youth career
- 2009–2013: Dorados

Senior career*
Years	Team	Apps	(Gls)
2013–2020	Dorados	56	(1)
2014	→ Tijuana (loan)	0	(0)
2015–2016	→ UAT (loan)	22	(0)
2017	→ Tijuana (loan)	0	(0)
2020–2022	Querétaro	16	(0)
2022–2023	Dorados	11	(0)
- * Club domestic league appearances and goals as of 8 January 2022

Juan Pablo Meza Tepezano (born 13 August 1993) is a Mexican professional footballer who plays as a defender for Liga MX club Querétaro.
