= Marcelo Gracia =

Mexican footballer (born 1994)

Personal information
- Full name: Marcelo Gracia Domínguez
- Date of birth: 2 April 1994 (age 32)
- Place of birth: Monterrey, Nuevo León, Mexico
- Height: 1.71 m (5 ft 7 in)
- Position: Forward

Senior career*
Years	Team	Apps	(Gls)
2013–2018	Monterrey	4	(0)
2017	→ Tlaxcala (loan)	12	(2)
2017	→ Atlante (loan)	3	(0)
2018–2019	Loros UdeC	14	(0)
2020	Cascavel CR	0	(0)

International career
2011	Mexico U17	5	(0)
Medal record
Representing Mexico
First place	FIFA U-17 World Cup	2011 Mexico
- * Club domestic league appearances and goals as of 26 May 2020

Marcelo Gracia Domínguez (born 2 April 1994) is a former Mexican professional footballer who last played for Loros UdeC on loan from Monterrey. He was part of Mexico's national under-17 squad that won the 2011 FIFA U-17 World Cup in home soil.

== Career ==
=== Club career ===
In 2020, Gracia moved to Brazil and joined Cascavel CR.

== Honours ==
Monterrey

- CONCACAF Champions League: 2012–13

Mexico U17

- FIFA U-17 World Cup: 2011
