= Jesús García (footballer, born 1994) =

Mexican footballer

Personal information
- Full name: Jesús Daniel García Esparza
- Date of birth: 7 August 1994 (age 32)
- Place of birth: Navolato, Sinaloa, Mexico
- Height: 1.76 m (5 ft 9 in)
- Position: Midfielder

Youth career
- 2012–2013: Tijuana
- 2013–2014: Deportivo La Cruz

Senior career*
Years	Team	Apps	(Gls)
2015	Estudiantes Tecos	4	(0)
2015–2016	Sinaloa	7	(0)
2016–2017	Cruz Azul	4	(1)
2017	→ Toluca (loan)	0	(0)
2018	Pacific	4	(1)
2018	Murciélagos	8	(1)
2018	Real Zamora	13	(4)
2019	La Piedad	12	(1)
2019–2020	Gavilanes de Matamoros	23	(7)
2025	UAT	0	(0)
- * Club domestic league appearances and goals

Jesús Daniel García Esparza (Note: In this Spanish name, the first or paternal surname is García and the second or maternal family name is Esparza.) (born 7 August 1994) is a Mexican footballer who plays as a midfielder.
