= Ulises Zurita =

Mexican footballer (born 1997)

Personal information
- Full name: Ulises Zurita Jiménez
- Date of birth: 29 March 1997 (age 29)
- Place of birth: Guadalajara, Jalisco, Mexico
- Height: 1.78 m (5 ft 10 in)
- Position: Centre-back

Team information
- Current team: Atlético La Paz
- Number: 28

Youth career
- 2012–2017: Guadalajara

Senior career*
Years	Team	Apps	(Gls)
2017–2019	Guadalajara	0	(0)
2017	→ Atlético San Luis (loan)	2	(0)
2018	→ Venados (loan)	6	(0)
2019–2020	Salamanca CF	1	(0)
2019–2020	Salamanca B	23	(0)
2020–2022	Atlético Morelia	67	(1)
2022–	Atlético La Paz	60	(1)
- * Club domestic league appearances and goals as of 11 April 2025

Ulises Zurita Jiménez (Note: In this Spanish name, the first or paternal surname is Zurita and the second or maternal family name is Jiménez.) (born 29 March 1997) is a Mexican professional footballer who plays as a centre-back for Liga de Expansión MX club Atlético La Paz.

== Honours ==
Morelia

- Liga de Expansión MX: Clausura 2022
