= Ángel Bautista =

Mexican footballer (born 1994)

Personal information
- Full name: Ángel Román Bautista Aguilar
- Date of birth: 18 September 1994 (age 32)
- Place of birth: Tula de Allende, Hidalgo, México
- Height: 1.63 m (5 ft 4 in)
- Position: Midfielder

Youth career
- 2010–2017: Pachuca

Senior career*
Years	Team	Apps	(Gls)
2013–2015	Pachuca	0	(0)
2014–2017	→ Tlaxcala (loan)	63	(17)
2017	→ Oaxaca (loan)	2	(0)
2018	Morelos	15	(2)
2019	Tlaxcala	17	(5)
2021	Tlaxcala	5	(0)
2023	Industriales Naucalpan F.C.		
- * Club domestic league appearances and goals as of 12 November 2021

Ángel Román Bautista Aguilar (born 18 September 1994) is a Mexican footballer who plays as a midfielder for Oaxaca on loan from Pachuca.
