= Juan de Alba =

Mexican footballer (born 1994)

Personal information
- Full name: Juan Manuel de Alba Flores
- Date of birth: 27 August 1994 (age 32)
- Place of birth: Ocotlán, Jalisco, México
- Height: 1.78 m (5 ft 10 in)
- Position: Centre-back

Youth career
- 2009–2013: Jaguares de Chiapas
- 2013–2015: Querétaro

Senior career*
Years	Team	Apps	(Gls)
2013–2017	Querétaro	0	(0)
2014	→ Irapuato (loan)	12	(0)
2016–2017	→ Sonora (loan)	35	(1)
2018–2019	→ Sonora (loan)	41	(0)
2019	Loros UdeC	12	(1)
2020	Inter Playa	7	(0)
2020	San José	0	(0)
2021–2023	UdeG	67	(3)
2023	Municipal Limeño	19	(0)
2024–2025	Venados	23	(0)
2025	Irapuato	0	(0)
- * Club domestic league appearances and goals as of 3 May 2022

Juan Manuel de Alba Flores (born 27 August 1994) is a Mexican professional footballer who plays as a centre-back.
