= Edgar Alaffita =

Mexican footballer (born 1996)

Édgar Alaffita
Personal information
- Full name: Édgar Jahir Alaffita García
- Date of birth: 18 October 1996 (age 30)
- Place of birth: Poza Rica, Veracruz, Mexico
- Height: 1.60 m (5 ft 3 in)
- Position: Defender

Team information
- Current team: Atlético La Paz
- Number: 13

Youth career
- 2012–2013: Veracruz

Senior career*
Years	Team	Apps	(Gls)
2013–2014	San Luis	2	(0)
2014–2017	Necaxa	42	(1)
2016	→ Lobos BUAP (loan)	12	(0)
2017	→ Sonora (loan)	19	(3)
2018–2020	Alebrijes de Oaxaca	34	(2)
2020–2021	Atlante	40	(3)
2021–2022	Pumas Tabasco	49	(5)
2023	UNAM	2	(0)
2023–	Atlético La Paz	74	(4)
- * Club domestic league appearances and goals as of 3 December 2025

Édgar Jahir Alaffita García (born 18 October 1996) is a Mexican professional footballer who plays as a defender for Liga de Expansión MX club Atlético La Paz.

== Club career ==
Alaffita was discovered by Miguel Fuentes, who was San Luis's coach at the time, while playing for San Luis in various youth competitions. He signed his first professional contract in June 2013 and made his first team league debut on 30 August 2013, coming on as a 66' substitute for Néstor Olguín in a 2–1 win against Estudiantes Tecos.

Alaffita was loaned out to Club Necaxa in June 2014.

Alaffita joined Pumas Tabasco in May 2021. He became a consistent starter and rose to be club captain. Alaffita began training with the first team, Pumas UNAM, in late 2022. He was ultimately included on the team roster by manager Rafael Puente Jr.

On 8 January 2023, Alaffita made his Liga MX debut with UNAM as a member of the starting lineup in their 2–1 win over Juárez.

In June 2023, Alaffita signed with Atlético La Paz.

== Honours ==
=== Club ===
Necaxa

- Ascenso MX: Apertura 2014, Clausura 2016

Alebrijes de Oaxaca

- Ascenso MX: Apertura 2019
