= Franco Faría =

Argentine footballer (born 1995)

Personal information
- Full name: Franco Miguel Faría
- Date of birth: 29 September 1992 (age 34)
- Place of birth: Suardi, Argentina
- Height: 1.78 m (5 ft 10 in)
- Position: Attacking midfielder

Team information
- Current team: Trasandino
- Number: 33

Youth career
- Unión Santa Fe

Senior career*
Years	Team	Apps	(Gls)
2013–2014	Unión Santa Fe	6	(0)
2014–2015	9 de Julio	20	(4)
2016	Independiente Chivilcoy	11	(2)
2016–2017	Unión Sunchales	9	(1)
2017–2020	UNAM	0	(0)
2017–2019	→ Venados (loan)	40	(3)
2019	→ Alebrijes (loan)	9	(1)
2020	Mushuc Runa	15	(3)
2021	Central Norte	25	(1)
2022	Rafaela	15	(1)
2023	Cerro	13	(0)
2023	Danubio	5	(1)
2024–	Trasandino	13	(2)
- * Club domestic league appearances and goals as of 3 July 2024

Franco Miguel Faría (born September 29, 1995, in Santa Fe, Argentina) is an Argentine professional footballer who currently plays for Chilean club Trasandino de Los Andes.

== Career ==
In 2024, Faría moved to Chile and signed with Trasandino in the Segunda División Profesional.
