= Emmanuel Segura =

Mexican footballer (born 1993)

Personal information
- Full name: Emmanuel Segura Maldonado
- Date of birth: 17 February 1993 (age 33)
- Place of birth: San Luis Potosí, Mexico
- Height: 1.70 m (5 ft 7 in)
- Position: Midfielder

Team information
- Current team: Cafetaleros de Chiapas
- Number: 5

Youth career
- 2009–2014: UANL

Senior career*
Years	Team	Apps	(Gls)
2014–2018	UANL	0	(0)
2015–2016	→ Tampico Madero (loan)	40	(2)
2016–2017	→ Alebrijes de Oaxaca (loan)	36	(0)
2017	→ Juárez (loan)	0	(0)
2018	→ Sinaloa (loan)	8	(0)
2018–2019	Cimarrones de Sonora	27	(3)
2019–	Cafetaleros de Chiapas	9	(0)
- * Club domestic league appearances and goals as of 19 October 2019

Emmanuel Segura Maldonado (born February 17, 1993) is a Mexican professional footballer who plays for Cafetaleros de Chiapas.
