= Ricardo Peña (Mexican footballer) =

Mexican footballer (born 1992)

Personal information
- Full name: Ricardo Israel Peña Franco
- Date of birth: 27 May 1992 (age 34)
- Place of birth: México City, Mexico
- Height: 1.78 m (5 ft 10 in)
- Position: Defender

Team information
- Current team: Jaiba Brava
- Number: 3

Youth career
- 2009–2013: Pumas UNAM

Senior career*
Years	Team	Apps	(Gls)
2013–2019	Querétaro	10	(0)
2018	→ Sonora (loan)	25	(1)
2020–2024	Celaya	145	(2)
2024–2025	Zacatecas	34	(2)
2025–2026	Irapuato	30	(0)
2026–	Jaiba Brava	7	(0)
- * Club domestic league appearances and goals as of 16 September 2026

Ricardo Israel Peña Franco (born 27 May 1992) is a Mexican professional footballer who plays as a defender for Liga de Expansión MX club Jaiba Brava.
