= Daniel Vogel =

Mexican footballer (born 1991)

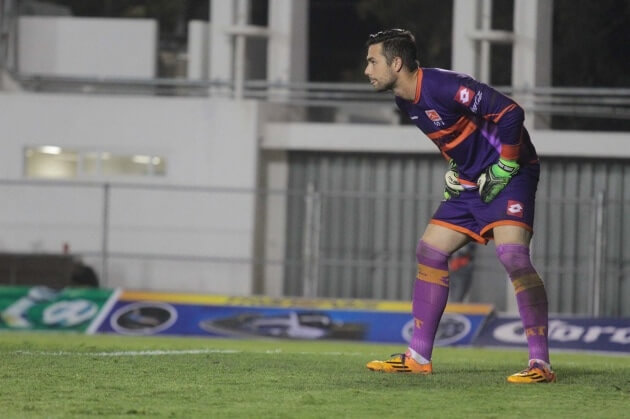
- Vogel in 2016

Personal information
- Full name: Daniel Alejandro Vogel Morton
- Date of birth: 26 February 1991 (age 35)
- Place of birth: Ciudad Victoria, Tamaulipas, México
- Height: 1.95 m (6 ft 5 in)
- Position: Goalkeeper

Youth career
- Tigres UANL

Senior career*
Years	Team	Apps	(Gls)
2011–2017	Correcaminos UAT	20	(0)
2017–2018	Atlético San Luis		
- * Club domestic league appearances and goals

Daniel Vogel (born 26 February 1991) is a Mexican professional footballer who plays as a goalkeeper.

== Career ==
Vogel was born in Ciudad Victoria, Tamaulipas. He played as a striker but due to his height they decided to train him as a goalkeeper. He was trained at Tigres UANL. During the Apertura 2009 he joined the first team as third goalkeeper he was active in the under-20 team.

Vogel joined Correcaminos UAT in 2011.

In December 2017 Vogel moved to Atlético San Luis.
