= Martín Orozco =

Mexican footballer (born 1995)

Personal information
- Full name: Martín Salvador Orozco Trujillo
- Date of birth: 22 August 1995 (age 31)
- Place of birth: Guadalajara, Jalisco, Mexico
- Height: 1.69 m (5 ft 7 in)
- Position: Defender

Youth career
- 2012–2013: Toluca
- 2013–2016: Querétaro

Senior career*
Years	Team	Apps	(Gls)
2016–2018	Querétaro Premier	25	(0)
2016–2017	→ Cimarrones de Sonora (loan)	13	(0)
2018	Querétaro	0	(0)
2019–2020	→ Cimarrones de Sonora (loan)	18	(0)
2020	San José	0	(0)
- * Club domestic league appearances and goals as of 22:44, 23 January 2020 (UTC)

Martín Salvador Orozco Trujillo (Note: In this Spanish name, the first or paternal surname is Orozco and the second or maternal family name is Trujillo.) (born 22 August 1995) is a professional Mexican footballer who currently plays for Cimarrones de Sonora on loan from Querétaro.
