= Óscar Uscanga =

Mexican footballer (born 1990)

Personal information
- Full name: Óscar Eduardo Uscanga Gutiérrez
- Date of birth: January 31, 1990 (age 36)
- Place of birth: Coatzacoalcos, Veracruz, Mexico
- Height: 1.67 m (5 ft 6 in)
- Position: Attacking midfielder

Youth career
- 2007–2008: Tiburones Rojos de Boca del Rio

Senior career*
Years	Team	Apps	(Gls)
2009	Potros Chetumal	20	(4)
2009–2017	Atlante	61	(3)
2018	Tampico Madero	22	(4)
- * Club domestic league appearances and goals as of March 5, 2009

Óscar Eduardo Uscanga Gutiérrez (born January 31, 1990) is a Mexican football attacking midfielder currently playing for Tampico Madero, in Ascenso MX.

Uscanga and his younger brother, Francisco, made the Atlante bench for the Clausura 2009 season. Both of them have been splitting time at Atlante's filial team, Potros Chetumal.
