= Carlos Lugo (Mexican footballer) =

Mexican footballer (born 1993)

Personal information
- Full name: Carlos Alberto Lugo Gamboa
- Date of birth: 6 February 1993 (age 33)
- Place of birth: Ahome, Sinaloa, Mexico
- Height: 1.80 m (5 ft 11 in)
- Position: Defender

Youth career
- 2009–2014: Guadalajara

Senior career*
Years	Team	Apps	(Gls)
2014–2016	Guadalajara	0	(0)
2014–2015	→ Coras (loan)	21	(1)
2017	→ La Piedad (loan)	13	(0)
2017	→ Zacatepec (loan)	0	(0)
2018–2020	La Piedad	21	(3)
2020–2021	Tecos	28	(4)
2021	UAT	9	(1)
2022	Durango	5	(0)
- * Club domestic league appearances and goals

Carlos Alberto Lugo Gamboa (born 6 February 1993) is a Mexican footballer who plays as a defender.

== Career ==
=== C.D. Guadalajara ===
Lugo spent his whole youth career at C.D. Guadalajara's youth academy.

==== Loan at Coras ====
In July 2014, it was announced Lugo was sent out on loan to Ascenso MX club Coras de Tepic in order to gain professional playing experience. He made his professional debut on 13 September 2014 against Atlético San Luis.
