= List of Mexican football transfers winter 2018–19 =

This is a list of Mexican football transfers for the 2018–19 winter transfer window, grouped by club. It includes football transfers related to clubs from the Liga Bancomer MX and the Ascenso MX.

== Liga Bancomer MX ==
=== América ===
In: Note: Flags indicate national team as defined under FIFA eligibility rules; some limited exceptions apply. Players may hold more than one non-FIFA nationality.

No.	Pos.	Nation	Player
26	MF	MEX	Sebastián Córdova (loan return from Necaxa)
—	MF	COL	Nicolás Benedetti (from (Colombia) Deportivo Cali)
—	FW	CHI	Nicolás Castillo (from (Portugal) Benfica)

Out: Note: Flags indicate national team as defined under FIFA eligibility rules; some limited exceptions apply. Players may hold more than one non-FIFA nationality.

No.	Pos.	Nation	Player
10	MF	PAR	Cecilio Domínguez (to (Argentina) Independiente)
14	MF	USA	Joe Corona (loan return to Tijuana)
15	MF	MEX	Pedro Arce (to (Greece) Panionios)
17	FW	ARG	Cristian Insaurralde (loan return to (Chile) O'Higgins)
20	MF	MEX	Diego Lainez (to (Spain) Betis)
26	DF	MEX	Ulises Torres (on loan to Atlas)
95	MF	MEX	Manuel Pérez (on loan to Zacatecas)
98	DF	MEX	Juan Pablo Juárez (on loan to Atlante)
—	DF	MEX	Bryan Colula (on loan to Venados, previously on loan at Oaxaca)
—	DF	MEX	Osmar Mares (on loan to Necaxa, previously on loan at Veracruz)
—	MF	MEX	Carlos Camacho (on loan to Celaya, previously on loan at Necaxa)
—	MF	MEX	José Luis Hernández (on loan to Zacatepec, previously on loan at Necaxa)
—	MF	PAR	Cristhian Paredes (unattached, previously on loan at (United States) Portland Timbers)
—	MF	MEX	Sergio Rodríguez (on loan to Tlaxcala)

=== Atlas ===
In: Note: Flags indicate national team as defined under FIFA eligibility rules; some limited exceptions apply. Players may hold more than one non-FIFA nationality.

No.	Pos.	Nation	Player
4	DF	COL	Jorge Segura (on loan from (England) Watford, previously on loan at (Colombia) Independiente Medellín)
5	DF	PER	Anderson Santamaría (from Puebla)
9	FW	URU	Facundo Barceló (on loan from (Uruguay) Juventud, previously on loan at (Argentina) Patronato)
15	MF	PAR	Osvaldo Martínez (from Santos Laguna)
22	MF	COL	Hernán Burbano (from (Colombia) Santa Fe)
24	DF	MEX	Ulises Torres (on loan from América)
26	MF	MEX	Jesús Isijara (from Santos Laguna)
28	MF	HON	Cristian Cálix (from (Honduras) Marathón)
34	DF	MEX	Irving Zurita (on loan from Atlante)
—	MF	CHI	Esteban Carvajal (on loan from (Chile) Coquimbo Unido)

Out: Note: Flags indicate national team as defined under FIFA eligibility rules; some limited exceptions apply. Players may hold more than one non-FIFA nationality.

No.	Pos.	Nation	Player
3	DF	COL	Leiton Jiménez (to BUAP)
5	DF	MEX	Gaddi Aguirre (on loan to Tampico Madero)
11	MF	ARG	Ricky Álvarez (unattached)
15	MF	MEX	Bryan Garnica (to Santos Laguna)
19	FW	URU	Octavio Rivero (to (Uruguay) Nacional)
21	MF	CHI	Lorenzo Reyes (unattached)
24	DF	MEX	Cristian González (on loan to Veracruz)
26	DF	MEX	Cristian Calderón (to Necaxa)
28	MF	CMR	Patrick Soko (on loan to Atlante)
30	DF	MEX	Edson García (on loan to Veracruz)
—	MF	MEX	Ricardo Bocanegra (to (United States) New York Cosmos)
—	MF	MEX	Daniel Hernández (on loan to UAEM)
—	MF	MEX	Rodolfo Salinas (on loan to Zacatepec, previously on loan at Celaya)
—	FW	ARG	Matías Alustiza (on loan to Puebla, previously on loan at UNAM)
—	FW	MEX	Jahir Barraza (on loan to (United States) San Antonio, previously on loan at Venados)
—	FW	ECU	Fidel Martínez (to (Ecuador) Barcelona, previously on loan at (Uruguay) Peñarol)
—	FW	MEX	Roberto Mendoza (on loan to Durango, previously on loan at Tapachula)
—	FW	MEX	Flavio Santos (on loan to Juárez, previously on loan at Oaxaca)
—	FW	MEX	Brayan Villalobos (on loan to Tepatitlán, previously on loan at Tapachula)

=== BUAP ===
In: Note: Flags indicate national team as defined under FIFA eligibility rules; some limited exceptions apply. Players may hold more than one non-FIFA nationality.

No.	Pos.	Nation	Player
17	MF	MEX	Rafael Durán (on loan from UANL)
22	FW	PER	Beto da Silva (on loan from UANL)
25	DF	PAR	Víctor Velázquez (from (Paraguay) Nacional)
30	DF	COL	Leiton Jiménez (from Atlas)
307	MF	MEX	Óscar Macías (on loan from Guadalajara, previously on loan at Zacatepec)
310	MF	MEX	Edson Torres (on loan from Guadalajara)

Out: Note: Flags indicate national team as defined under FIFA eligibility rules; some limited exceptions apply. Players may hold more than one non-FIFA nationality.

No.	Pos.	Nation	Player
9	FW	MEX	Diego Jiménez (on loan to Tampico Madero)
11	MF	ECU	Gabriel Cortez (on loan to (Ecuador) Emelec)
13	MF	MEX	Omar Tejeda (on loan to UAT)
15	MF	ECU	Jordan Sierra (loan return to UANL)
24	DF	MEX	Rodrigo Godínez (on loan to UdeG)
30	FW	TUR	Colin Kazim-Richards (loan return to (Brazil) Corinthians)
—	DF	MEX	Carlos Martínez (on loan to Tuxtla, previously on loan at Tabasco)
—	DF	MEX	Richard Okunorobo (to (Panama) Unión Deportivo Universitario, previously on loan at Oaxaca)
—	FW	MEX	Amaury Escoto (on loan to Sinaloa, previously on loan at Toluca)
—	FW	ARG	Nicolás Ankia (on loan to Durango)
—	FW	MEX	Luis Mouret (on loan to Orizaba, previously on loan at Tabasco)

=== Cruz Azul ===
In: Note: Flags indicate national team as defined under FIFA eligibility rules; some limited exceptions apply. Players may hold more than one non-FIFA nationality.

No.	Pos.	Nation	Player
3	MF	POR	Stephen Eustáquio (from (Portugal) Chaves)
6	MF	PER	Yoshimar Yotún (from (United States) Orlando City SC)
7	FW	URU	Martín Cauteruccio (re-signed)
13	FW	URU	Jonathan Rodríguez (from Santos Laguna)
14	MF	MEX	Misael Domínguez (from Monterrey, previously on loan)
20	MF	MEX	Alexis Gutiérrez (from Guadalajara)
31	MF	MEX	Orbelín Pineda (from Guadalajara)

Out: Note: Flags indicate national team as defined under FIFA eligibility rules; some limited exceptions apply. Players may hold more than one non-FIFA nationality.

No.	Pos.	Nation	Player
10	MF	ARG	Walter Montoya (on loan to (Brazil) Grêmio)
13	MF	ECU	Ángel Mena (to León)
18	FW	COL	Andrés Rentería (on loan to (Argentina) San Lorenzo)
292	MF	MEX	Osvan Díaz (on loan to Cancún)
—	GK	MEX	Eduardo Salazar (on loan to Tuxtla)
—	DF	MEX	Francisco Flores (on loan to Cancún, previously on loan at Tlaxcala)
—	DF	MEX	Juan Carlos García (on loan to Celaya, previously on loan at UAT)
—	MF	MEX	Yamir Álvarez (unattached, previously on loan at UACH)
—	MF	MEX	Porfirio Bastida (on loan to Nuevo Chimalhuacán, previously on loan at Cancún)
—	MF	MEX	Christian Giménez (retired, previously on loan at Pachuca)
—	MF	MEX	Alán Guadarrama (on loan to Puebla)
—	MF	CHI	Martín Rodríguez (to UNAM, previously on loan)
—	FW	CHI	Felipe Mora (to UNAM, previously on loan)

=== Guadalajara ===
In: Note: Flags indicate national team as defined under FIFA eligibility rules; some limited exceptions apply. Players may hold more than one non-FIFA nationality.

No.	Pos.	Nation	Player
3	DF	MEX	Alejandro Mayorga (loan return from Necaxa)
4	DF	MEX	Jair Pereira (re-signed)
6	MF	MEX	Dieter Villalpando (from Pachuca, previously on loan at Necaxa)
7	FW	MEX	Alexis Vega (from Toluca)
9	FW	MEX	Alan Pulido (re-signed)
10	MF	MEX	Eduardo López (re-signed)
15	DF	MEX	Tony Alfaro (from (United States) Seattle Sounders FC)
18	FW	MEX	Ronaldo Cisneros (loan return from Zacatepec)
19	FW	MEX	Luis Madrigal (on loan from Monterrey)
20	MF	MEX	Jesús Molina (from Monterrey)
21	DF	MEX	Hiram Mier (from Querétaro)
27	DF	MEX	Carlos Villanueva (loan return from Necaxa)

Out: Note: Flags indicate national team as defined under FIFA eligibility rules; some limited exceptions apply. Players may hold more than one non-FIFA nationality.

No.	Pos.	Nation	Player
3	DF	MEX	Carlos Salcido (to Veracruz)
6	DF	MEX	Edwin Hernández (to Pachuca)
7	FW	MEX	Orbelín Pineda (to Cruz Azul)
14	FW	MEX	Ángel Zaldívar (on loan to Monterrey)
15	FW	MEX	Ángel Sepúlveda (to Necaxa)
33	DF	MEX	Mario de Luna (on loan to Atlético San Luis)
87	FW	MEX	Cristian Ortiz (on loan to Zacatepec)
97	DF	MEX	Héctor Reynoso (on loan to Zacatepec)
292	FW	MEX	José Juan Macías (on loan to León)
294	MF	MEX	Alexis Gutiérrez (to Cruz Azul)
296	DF	MEX	Benjamín Galindo Jr. (on loan to (United States) Reno 1868)
302	MF	MEX	Edson Torres (on loan to BUAP)
305	MF	MEX	César Huerta (on loan to Zacatepec)
333	MF	MEX	Zahid Muñoz (on loan to Zacatepec)
—	DF	MEX	José Peralta (on loan to Murciélagos, previously on loan at Zacatepec)
—	DF	MEX	Néstor Vidrio (on loan to Puebla, previously on loan at UdeG)
—	MF	MEX	Michelle Benítez (on loan to Celaya, previously on loan at Zacatepec)
—	MF	MEX	Fernando González (to Necaxa, previously on loan)
—	MF	MEX	William Guzmán (on loan to La Piedad, previously on loan at UAT)
—	MF	MEX	Giovani Hernández (on loan to Zacatepec, previously on loan at Necaxa)
—	MF	MEX	Luis Márquez (on loan to Tampico Madero, previously on loan at Zacatepec)
—	MF	MEX	Óscar Macías (on loan to BUAP, previously on loan at Zacatepec)
—	MF	MEX	Kevin Ramírez (on loan to (United States) El Paso Locomotive, previously on loan at Zacatepec)
—	FW	MEX	Marco Granados (on loan to (Greece) Aiginiakos, previously on loan at Tuxtla)
—	FW	MEX	Daniel Ríos (to (United States) Nashville MLS, previously on loan at (United States) North Carolina)

=== León ===
In: Note: Flags indicate national team as defined under FIFA eligibility rules; some limited exceptions apply. Players may hold more than one non-FIFA nationality.

No.	Pos.	Nation	Player
8	MF	CRC	Joel Campbell (from (Italy) Frosinone)
13	MF	ECU	Ángel Mena (from Cruz Azul)
14	MF	ARG	Rubens Sambueza (from Toluca)
15	MF	MEX	Iván Ochoa (on loan from Pachuca, previously on loan at (Chile) Everton)
21	FW	MEX	José Juan Macías (on loan from Guadalajara)
32	DF	CHI	Dilan Zúñiga (on loan from (Chile) Everton)
33	FW	ECU	Vinicio Angulo (from Sinaloa)
—	DF	ARG	Ramiro González (from (Chile) Unión Española)

Out: Note: Flags indicate national team as defined under FIFA eligibility rules; some limited exceptions apply. Players may hold more than one non-FIFA nationality.

No.	Pos.	Nation	Player
2	DF	MEX	Miguel Velázquez (loan return to Pachuca)
3	DF	MEX	Cristian Torres (on loan to UAT)
7	MF	MEX	Leonel López (on loan to Toluca)
13	MF	COL	Alexander Mejía (to (Paraguay) Libertad)
15	DF	MEX	Jorge Durán (on loan to La Piedad)
17	FW	ARG	Mauro Boselli (to (Brazil) Corinthians)
20	MF	MEX	Héctor Mascorro (loan return to Pachuca)
21	MF	ARG	Maximiliano Cerato (on loan to (Chile) Everton)
23	DF	CHI	Juan Cornejo (on loan to (Chile) Universidad Católica)
31	FW	MEX	Claudio González (on loan to UAT)
32	MF	MEX	Fernando Moreno (unattached)
—	MF	MEX	Luis Miguel Franco (on loan to Yalmakán)
—	MF	MEX	Jesús Leal (on loan to UAEM)

=== Monterrey ===
In: Note: Flags indicate national team as defined under FIFA eligibility rules; some limited exceptions apply. Players may hold more than one non-FIFA nationality.

No.	Pos.	Nation	Player
9	FW	PAR	Adam Bareiro (from (Paraguay) Nacional)
19	FW	MEX	Ángel Zaldívar (on loan from Guadalajara)
30	GK	MEX	Luis Cárdenas (loan return from Querétaro)
32	MF	ARG	Maximiliano Meza (from (Argentina) Independiente)
—	DF	MEX	Miguel Layún (from (Spain) Villarreal)

Out: Note: Flags indicate national team as defined under FIFA eligibility rules; some limited exceptions apply. Players may hold more than one non-FIFA nationality.

No.	Pos.	Nation	Player
19	FW	MEX	Luis Madrigal (on loan to Guadalajara)
21	MF	MEX	Jesús Molina (to Guadalajara)
22	GK	ARG	Juan Pablo Carrizo (to (Paraguay) Cerro Porteño)
286	MF	MEX	Daniel Lajud (on loan to Querétaro)
—	DF	MEX	Juan Álvarez (on loan to Matamoros)
—	DF	USA	Edgar Castillo (to (United States) Colorado Rapids, previously on loan)
—	MF	MEX	Érick Amaro (on loan to Pacific)
—	MF	COL	Edwin Cardona (on loan to Pachuca, previously on loan at (Argentina) Boca Juniors)
—	MF	MEX	Misael Domínguez (to Cruz Azul, previously on loan)
—	MF	MEX	Alejandro García (on loan to UAEM)
—	MF	MEX	Cándido Ramírez (on loan to Morelia, previously on loan at UAT)
—	FW	MEX	Julio Cruz (on loan to (Costa Rica) Cartaginés, previously on loan at (Costa Rica) Guadalupe)
—	FW	MEX	Ángel López (on loan to Murciélagos, previously on loan at Oaxaca)

=== Morelia ===
In: Note: Flags indicate national team as defined under FIFA eligibility rules; some limited exceptions apply. Players may hold more than one non-FIFA nationality.

No.	Pos.	Nation	Player
6	DF	CHI	Sebastián Vegas (re-signed)
8	MF	MEX	Mario Osuna (re-signed)
15	MF	MEX	Cándido Ramírez (on loan from Monterrey, previously on loan at UAT)
22	MF	MEX	Alberto Acosta (on loan from UANL)
24	DF	ECU	Gabriel Achilier (re-signed)

Out: Note: Flags indicate national team as defined under FIFA eligibility rules; some limited exceptions apply. Players may hold more than one non-FIFA nationality.

No.	Pos.	Nation	Player
5	DF	MEX	Carlos Guzmán (to Necaxa)
10	MF	CHI	Diego Valdés (to Santos Laguna)
23	MF	MEX	Salvador Reyes (on loan to Sonora)
32	DF	MEX	Ignacio González (on loan to UAT)
97	MF	MEX	Édgar Huerta (on loan to Matamoros)
—	MF	MEX	Víctor Guajardo (on loan to Tampico Madero, previously on loan at Venados)
—	MF	MEX	Luis Ángel Morales (on loan to La Piedad)
—	MF	USA	Ernest Nungaray (on loan to (Peru) Ayacucho, previously on loan at (Peru) Sport Boys)
—	MF	PER	Andy Polo (to (United States) Portland Timbers, previously on loan)
—	MF	MEX	Hibert Ruiz (on loan to Necaxa, previously on loan at Veracruz)
—	FW	MEX	Ulises Jaimes (on loan to Durango, previously on loan at UdeC)

=== Necaxa ===
In: Note: Flags indicate national team as defined under FIFA eligibility rules; some limited exceptions apply. Players may hold more than one non-FIFA nationality.

No.	Pos.	Nation	Player
4	DF	MEX	Alexis Peña (from Pachuca)
5	DF	ARG	Fernando Meza (from (Chile) Colo-Colo)
12	DF	MEX	Carlos Guzmán (from Morelia)
16	MF	MEX	Hibert Ruiz (on loan from Morelia, previously on loan at Veracruz)
20	DF	MEX	Osmar Mares (on loan from América, previously on loan at Veracruz)
21	FW	MEX	Eduardo Herrera (on loan from (Scotland) Rangers, previously on loan at Santos Laguna)
23	MF	MEX	Ángel Sepúlveda (from Guadalajara)
24	MF	MEX	Fernando González (from Guadalajara, previously on loan)
26	DF	MEX	Cristian Calderón (from Atlas)
27	FW	ARG	Rodrigo Contreras (from (Argentina) San Lorenzo, previously on loan at (Chile) Antofagasta)
30	MF	ECU	Kevin Mercado (from (Spain) Recreativo Granada, previously on loan at (Ecuador) Universidad Católica)
—	MF	CHI	Martín Lara (from (Chile) Universidad Católica)

Out: Note: Flags indicate national team as defined under FIFA eligibility rules; some limited exceptions apply. Players may hold more than one non-FIFA nationality.

No.	Pos.	Nation	Player
4	DF	MEX	Carlos Villanueva (loan return to Guadalajara)
5	DF	MEX	Alejandro Mayorga (loan return to Guadalajara)
10	MF	MEX	Dieter Villalpando (loan return to Pachuca)
12	GK	MEX	Luis Alejandro Chávez (unattached)
19	FW	ARG	Claudio Riaño (to (Argentina) Rosario Central)
21	MF	MEX	José Luis Hernández (loan return to América)
22	MF	MEX	Sebastián Córdova (loan return to América)
23	DF	MEX	Leobardo López (loan return to Veracruz)
26	MF	CHI	Víctor Dávila (to Pachuca)
27	MF	MEX	Carlos Peña (loan return to (Scotland) Rangers)
28	MF	MEX	Giovani Hernández (loan return to Guadalajara)
30	DF	MEX	José Medina (on loan to UAT)
34	MF	MEX	Carlos Camacho (loan return to América)
300	MF	COL	Andrés Berrio (on loan to Zacatepec)
—	DF	MEX	Carlos Ramos (on loan to Venados, previously on loan at Celaya)
—	MF	MEX	Xavier Báez (to (United States) Austin Bold)
—	MF	MEX	Alan García (on loan to Tlaxcala, previously on loan at Cancún)
—	MF	MEX	Baruch Luna (unattached, previously on loan at Atlante)
—	MF	MEX	Juan Valenzuela (unattached, previously on loan at UACH)
—	MF	MEX	Jonathan Valdivia (unattached, previously on loan at Zacatepec)
—	FW	MEX	Kevin Chaurand (on loan to Atlético Reynosa, previously on loan at Zacatepec)
—	FW	COL	Gustavo Culma (unattached, previously on loan at UAT)
—	FW	MEX	Rodrigo Prieto (on loan to Zacatepec, previously on loan at Juárez)

=== Pachuca ===
In: Note: Flags indicate national team as defined under FIFA eligibility rules; some limited exceptions apply. Players may hold more than one non-FIFA nationality.

No.	Pos.	Nation	Player
3	GK	CRC	Leonel Moreira (from (Costa Rica) Herediano)
10	MF	COL	Edwin Cardona (on loan from Monterrey, previously on loan at (Argentina) Boca Juniors)
15	DF	MEX	Edwin Hernández (from Guadalajara)
26	MF	CHI	Víctor Dávila (from Necaxa)
32	FW	ARG	Nahuel Bustos (on loan from (Argentina) Talleres)
33	FW	ARG	Ismael Sosa (on loan from UANL)

Out: Note: Flags indicate national team as defined under FIFA eligibility rules; some limited exceptions apply. Players may hold more than one non-FIFA nationality.

No.	Pos.	Nation	Player
3	DF	BRA	Elbis (on loan to Zacatepec)
8	MF	COL	Sebastián Pérez (loan return to (Argentina) Boca Juniors)
9	FW	COL	Juan David Pérez (on loan to (Colombia) Millonarios)
10	MF	MEX	Christian Giménez (loan return to Cruz Azul)
22	GK	MEX	Abraham Romero (to (United States) LA Galaxy II)
24	DF	URU	Robert Herrera (on loan to (Ecuador) Barcelona)
25	DF	MEX	Alexis Peña (to Necaxa)
28	MF	MEX	Erick Sánchez (on loan to Zacatecas)
32	GK	MEX	Andrés Sánchez (unattached)
33	DF	MEX	Brayan Castrejón (on loan to Atlético Reynosa)
34	MF	ARG	Sebastián Palacios (on loan to (Argentina) Talleres)
—	DF	MEX	Eduardo Castillo (on loan to UAEM)
—	DF	MEX	Hugo Rodríguez (to Santos Laguna, previously on loan at Puebla)
—	DF	MEX	Héctor López (on loan to Tlaxcala)
—	DF	COL	Dairon Mosquera (on loan to (Colombia) Independiente Medellín, previously on loan at (Paraguay) Olimpia)
—	DF	MEX	Abraham Torres Nilo (on loan to UAEM, previously on loan at Zacatepec)
—	DF	MEX	Miguel Velázquez (on loan to Zacatecas, previously on loan at León)
—	DF	MEX	Francisco Venegas (to UANL, previously on loan at (Chile) Everton)
—	MF	MEX	Héctor Mascorro (on loan to Zacatecas, previously on loan at León)
—	MF	MEX	Iván Ochoa (on loan to León, previously on loan at (Chile) Everton)
—	MF	ECU	Cristian Penilla (to (United States) New England Revolution, previously on loan)
—	MF	CHI	Edson Puch (on loan to (Chile) Universidad Católica, previously on loan at Querétaro)
—	MF	MEX	Dieter Villalpando (to Guadalajara, previously on loan at Necaxa)
—	FW	MEX	Marco Bueno (unattached, previously on loan at (Chile) Everton)
—	FW	CHI	Sergio Vergara (on loan to (Chile) Everton, previously on loan at Zacatecas)

=== Puebla ===
In: Note: Flags indicate national team as defined under FIFA eligibility rules; some limited exceptions apply. Players may hold more than one non-FIFA nationality.

No.	Pos.	Nation	Player
4	DF	BOL	Luis Haquin (from (Bolivia) Oriente Petrolero)
6	MF	MEX	Alejandro Zamudio (on loan from UNAM)
13	MF	VEN	Yohandry Orozco (from (Colombia) Tolima)
16	DF	MEX	Carlos Gerardo Rodríguez (on loan from Toluca)
27	MF	MEX	Alan Acosta (on loan from UNAM)
30	MF	MEX	Jesús Zavala (from Zacatecas)
32	FW	ARG	Matías Alustiza (on loan from Atlas, previously on loan at UNAM)
33	DF	MEX	Néstor Vidrio (on loan from Guadalajara, previously on loan at UdeG)
35	MF	MEX	Alán Guadarrama (on loan from Cruz Azul)

Out: Note: Flags indicate national team as defined under FIFA eligibility rules; some limited exceptions apply. Players may hold more than one non-FIFA nationality.

No.	Pos.	Nation	Player
13	GK	MEX	Tirso Trueba (on loan to (Spain) Toledo)
26	DF	PER	Anderson Santamaría (to Atlas)
27	DF	MEX	Hugo Rodríguez (loan return to Pachuca)
30	FW	MEX	Ángel Tecpanécatl (on loan to Tepatitlán)
31	FW	URU	Cristian Palacios (on loan to (Peru) Sporting Cristal)
287	DF	MEX	Alan Escoto (on loan to Tuxtla)
—	DF	USA	Joseph Pérez (unattached, previously on loan at (United States) Las Vegas Lights)
—	DF	MEX	Gerardo Venegas (on loan to Atlante, previously on loan at Oaxaca)
—	MF	MEX	Carlos Gutiérrez (on loan to Veracruz, previously on loan at Oaxaca)
—	FW	MEX	Jerónimo Amione (to (Finland) Lahti, previously on loan at Oaxaca)
—	FW	MEX	Eduardo Pérez (on loan to Tampico Madero)

=== Querétaro ===
In: Note: Flags indicate national team as defined under FIFA eligibility rules; some limited exceptions apply. Players may hold more than one non-FIFA nationality.

No.	Pos.	Nation	Player
13	MF	MEX	Daniel Lajud (on loan from Monterrey)
15	DF	MEX	Ricardo Peña (loan return from Sonora)
18	MF	ECU	Jordan Sierra (on loan from Tigres UANL, previously on loan at BUAP)
21	FW	COL	Ayron del Valle (on loan from (Colombia) Millonarios)
22	GK	ARG	Nicolás Navarro (on loan from (Argentina) San Lorenzo)
24	MF	PAR	Jorge Rojas (from (Paraguay) Cerro Porteño)
30	GK	MEX	Darío Romo (loan return from UAT)
27	FW	CIV	Aké Loba (on loan from (Peru) Universidad de San Martín)
305	DF	MEX	Adrián Caballero (loan return from Tapachula)

Out: Note: Flags indicate national team as defined under FIFA eligibility rules; some limited exceptions apply. Players may hold more than one non-FIFA nationality.

No.	Pos.	Nation	Player
1	GK	BRA	Tiago Volpi (on loan to (Brazil) São Paulo)
9	FW	BRA	Everaldo Stum (to (Brazil) Chapecoense)
10	MF	CHI	Edson Puch (loan return to Pachuca)
15	MF	MEX	Jesús Medina (on loan to Sonora)
18	MF	BRA	Augusto (to (Brazil) Chapecoense)
21	FW	MEX	Francisco Uscanga (on loan to Venados)
22	GK	MEX	Luis Cárdenas (loan return to Monterrey)
24	DF	MEX	Martín Orozco (on loan to Sonora)
27	DF	MEX	Hiram Mier (to Guadalajara)
281	DF	MEX	Sergio Vázquez (on loan to Sonora)
285	DF	MEX	Antonio Cortés (on loan to Sonora)
295	MF	MEX	Érick Espinosa (on loan to Sonora)
—	DF	MEX	Diego Guzmán (on loan to Inter Playa del Carmen, previously on loan at Sonora)
—	DF	USA	Josué Soto (unattached, previously on loan at Sonora)
—	DF	MEX	Alfonso Zúñiga (on loan to Sonora)
—	MF	ARG	Nery Domínguez (to (Argentina) Racing Club, previously on loan)
—	MF	USA	Luis Gil (unattached, previously on loan at (United States) Houston Dynamo)
—	MF	MEX	Cristian Quiñones (on loan to Durango, previously on loan at Sonora)
—	FW	MEX	Ronaldo Herrera (on loan to Inter Playa del Carmen, previously on loan at Sonora)
—	FW	MEX	Obayram Reyes (on loan to Inter Playa del Carmen, previously on loan at Sonora)
—	FW	MEX	Christian Sotomayor (on loan to Inter Playa del Carmen, previously on loan at Cancún)

=== Santos Laguna ===
In: Note: Flags indicate national team as defined under FIFA eligibility rules; some limited exceptions apply. Players may hold more than one non-FIFA nationality.

No.	Pos.	Nation	Player
4	DF	MEX	Jesús Angulo (re-signed)
7	MF	MEX	Bryan Garnica (from Atlas)
10	MF	CHI	Diego Valdés (from Morelia)
11	FW	COL	Marlos Moreno (on loan from (England) Manchester City, previously on loan at (Brazil) Flamengo)
19	FW	MEX	Eduardo Aguirre (loan return from Tampico Madero, later re-signed)
20	DF	MEX	Hugo Rodríguez (from Pachuca, previously on loan at Puebla)
28	GK	MEX	Carlos Acevedo (re-signed)
27	FW	ARG	Javier Correa (from (Argentina) Colón)
292	GK	MEX	Joel García (re-signed)

Out: Note: Flags indicate national team as defined under FIFA eligibility rules; some limited exceptions apply. Players may hold more than one non-FIFA nationality.

No.	Pos.	Nation	Player
3	DF	URU	Gerardo Alcoba (to (Argentina) Tigre)
7	MF	MEX	Jesús Isijara (to Atlas)
10	MF	PAR	Osvaldo Martínez (to Atlas)
11	FW	MEX	Eduardo Herrera (loan return to (Scotland) Rangers)
12	FW	COL	Edwuin Cetré (unattached)
13	FW	URU	Jonathan Rodríguez (to Cruz Azul)
20	MF	MEX	Alejandro Castro (loan return to UNAM)
27	FW	PAR	Cris Martínez (loan return to (Chile) Temuco)
—	GK	MEX	Julio González (on loan to Veracruz, previously on loan at Tampico Madero)
—	GK	MEX	Roy Ureña (on loan to Pacific)
—	DF	MEX	Jorge González (on loan to Tampico Madero)
—	DF	MEX	César Ibáñez (unattached, previously on loan at UAT)
—	DF	MEX	Luis Lozoya (re-loan to Celaya)
—	MF	MEX	Sergio Ceballos (unattached, previously on loan at UAEM)
—	MF	MEX	Ulises Dávila (to (India) Delhi Dynamos)
—	MF	COL	Mauricio Cuero (on loan to (Argentina) Belgrano, previously on loan at (Paraguay) Olimpia)

=== Tijuana ===
In: Note: Flags indicate national team as defined under FIFA eligibility rules; some limited exceptions apply. Players may hold more than one non-FIFA nationality.

No.	Pos.	Nation	Player
5	MF	COL	Kevin Balanta (on loan from (Colombia) Deportivo Cali)
12	FW	ARG	Gustavo Bou (loan return from (Argentina) Racing)
14	MF	USA	Joe Corona (loan return from América)
16	DF	ARG	Diego Braghieri (on loan from (Colombia) Atlético Nacional)
32	FW	ARG	Ariel Nahuelpán (from (Ecuador) Barcelona)

Out: Note: Flags indicate national team as defined under FIFA eligibility rules; some limited exceptions apply. Players may hold more than one non-FIFA nationality.

No.	Pos.	Nation	Player
9	FW	ARG	Juan Martín Lucero (to (Argentina) Godoy Cruz)
14	MF	USA	Alejandro Guido (to (United States) Los Angeles)
17	FW	USA	Rubio Rubin (on loan to Sinaloa)
21	DF	ARG	Gustavo Canto (on loan to Sinaloa)
—	DF	MEX	Luis García (on loan to Nayarit, previously on loan at Tuxtla)
—	DF	USA	Ángel Uribe (unattached, previously on loan at Sinaloa)
—	MF	BRA	Juninho (to (United States) LA Galaxy)
—	MF	BRA	Mateus Gonçalves (to (Brazil) Fluminense, previously on loan at (Brazil) Sport Recife)
—	MF	NGR	Mark Tanko (unattached, previously on loan at Cancún)

=== Toluca ===
In: Note: Flags indicate national team as defined under FIFA eligibility rules; some limited exceptions apply. Players may hold more than one non-FIFA nationality.

No.	Pos.	Nation	Player
9	FW	ARG	Emmanuel Gigliotti (from (Argentina) Independiente)
10	MF	MEX	Leonel López (on loan from León)
11	MF	MEX	Carlos Esquivel (loan return from Veracruz)
19	MF	COL	Felipe Pardo (from (Greece) Olympiacos)
20	MF	ARG	Federico Mancuello (from (Brazil) Cruzeiro)
33	DF	ARG	Jonathan Maidana (from (Argentina) River Plate)
89	FW	MEX	Martín Abundis (loan return from Celaya)

Out: Note: Flags indicate national team as defined under FIFA eligibility rules; some limited exceptions apply. Players may hold more than one non-FIFA nationality.

No.	Pos.	Nation	Player
9	FW	MEX	Alexis Vega (to Guadalajara)
11	FW	MEX	Amaury Escoto (loan return to BUAP)
14	MF	ARG	Rubens Sambueza (to León)
20	FW	URU	Javier Cabrera (unattached)
23	MF	COL	Luis Quiñones (loan return to UANL)
26	DF	COL	Cristian Borja (to (Portugal) Sporting CP)
33	DF	MEX	Carlos Calvo (loan return to Atlante)
87	MF	MEX	Edson Partida (on loan to (United States) El Paso Locomotive)
92	GK	MEX	Omar Vilchis (on loan to La Piedad)
94	MF	MEX	Juan Delgadillo (on loan to (Costa Rica) Cartaginés)
—	DF	MEX	Carlos Galeana (on loan to Venados, previously on loan at Celaya)
—	DF	USA	Andy Garcia (on loan to La Piedad, previously on loan at Real Zamora)
—	DF	MEX	Francisco Macías (on loan to Calor, previously on loan at UAEM)
—	DF	MEX	Mario Quezada (on loan to Sonora, previously on loan at Zacatepec)
—	DF	MEX	Carlos Gerardo Rodríguez (on loan to Puebla)
—	MF	MEX	Kevin Carranza (unattached, previously on loan at Sporting Canamy)
—	MF	ARG	Rodrigo Gómez (to (Argentina) San Martín, previously on loan at (Argentina) Unión)
—	MF	MEX	Moisés Velasco (on loan to UAEM, previously on loan at UAT)
—	MF	MEX	Michel Navarro (on loan to La Piedad, previously on loan at Real Zamora)
—	FW	MEX	Diego Gama (on loan to La Piedad, previously on loan at Real Zamora)
—	FW	MEX	Alexis Márquez (to (Spain) Atlético Pueblonuevo)
—	FW	MEX	Jonathan Osuna (on loan to Murciélagos, previously on loan at Irapuato)

=== UANL ===
In: Note: Flags indicate national team as defined under FIFA eligibility rules; some limited exceptions apply. Players may hold more than one non-FIFA nationality.

No.	Pos.	Nation	Player
3	DF	MEX	Carlos Salcedo (from (Germany) Eintracht Frankfurt)
10	FW	FRA	André-Pierre Gignac (re-signed)
15	DF	MEX	Francisco Venegas (from Pachuca, previously on loan at (Chile) Everton)
26	MF	COL	Luis Quiñones (loan return from Toluca)

Out: Note: Flags indicate national team as defined under FIFA eligibility rules; some limited exceptions apply. Players may hold more than one non-FIFA nationality.

No.	Pos.	Nation	Player
3	DF	BRA	Juninho (retired)
11	FW	PER	Beto da Silva (on loan to BUAP)
17	MF	MEX	Rafael Durán (on loan to BUAP)
18	FW	ARG	Ismael Sosa (on loan to Pachuca)
26	MF	MEX	Jhory Celaya (on loan to Atlante)
27	MF	MEX	Alberto Acosta (on loan to Morelia)
31	FW	MEX	Jonathan Vega (on loan to Sonora)
32	FW	MEX	Fernando Cruz (on loan to Tuxtla)
—	GK	MEX	Héctor Estrada (unattached, previously on loan at UAEM)
—	GK	MEX	Aarón Fernández (on loan to Celaya)
—	DF	COL	Danilo Arboleda (to (Colombia) La Equidad, previously on loan at (Colombia) América de Cali)
—	DF	MEX	Arturo Flores (unattached, previously on loan at Tuxtla)
—	DF	MEX	José Arturo Rivas (unattached, previously on loan at Veracruz)
—	DF	USA	Jesús Vázquez (on loan to Cancún, previously on loan at Atlante)
—	DF	COL	Andrés Zuluaga (on loan to Matamoros)
—	MF	MEX	Jhonatan Aranda (on loan to Matamoros, previously on loan at Juárez)
—	MF	COL	Jarlan Barrera (from (Colombia) Junior, later loaned to (Argentina) Rosario Central)
—	MF	COL	Luis Bonilla (on loan to Atlético Reynosa, previously on loan at (Colombia) Patriotas Boyacá)
—	MF	MEX	Daniel Elizondo (on loan to Atlético Reynosa, previously on loan at Tuxtla)
—	MF	MEX	Julio Ibarra (unattached, previously on loan at Tuxtla)
—	MF	MEX	Uvaldo Luna (to (Colombia) Unión Magdalena)
—	MF	COL	William Palacio (unattached, previously on loan at Celaya)
—	MF	MEX	Simón Alejandro Rodríguez (on loan to Atlante, previously on loan at Juárez)
—	MF	BRA	Alan Santos (on loan to (Brazil) Botafogo, previously on loan at (United Arab Emirates) Al-Ittihad Kalba)
—	MF	ECU	Jordan Sierra (on loan to Querétaro, previously on loan at BUAP)
—	MF	MEX	Alfonso Tamay (on loan to Venados, previously on loan at Tapachula)
—	MF	MEX	Cristhian Urbina (on loan to Atlético Saltillo)
—	MF	COL	Larry Vásquez (on loan to (Colombia) Tolima, previously on loan at (Colombia) América de Cali)
—	FW	BRA	Richard Luca (unattached, previously on loan at UAT)
—	FW	COL	Brayan Lucumí (on loan to (Colombia) Envigado, previously on loan at (Colombia) Deportivo Pasto)
—	FW	COL	Esneyder Mena (on loan to UAT, previously on loan at (Colombia) Patriotas Boyacá)

=== UNAM ===
In: Note: Flags indicate national team as defined under FIFA eligibility rules; some limited exceptions apply. Players may hold more than one non-FIFA nationality.

No.	Pos.	Nation	Player
9	FW	CHI	Felipe Mora (from Cruz Azul, previously on loan)
17	MF	CHI	Martín Rodríguez (from Cruz Azul, previously on loan)
82	GK	MEX	Gustavo Alcalá (loan return from Venados)
199	FW	MEX	Bryan Silva (loan return from Sporting Canamy)
—	DF	COL	Jeison Angulo (from (Colombia) Deportivo Cali)

Out: Note: Flags indicate national team as defined under FIFA eligibility rules; some limited exceptions apply. Players may hold more than one non-FIFA nationality.

No.	Pos.	Nation	Player
11	FW	ARG	Matías Alustiza (loan return to Atlas)
22	MF	MEX	Alan Acosta (on loan to Puebla)
98	FW	MEX	Omar Islas (on loan to Oaxaca)
—	DF	MEX	Francisco Reyes (unattached, previously on loan at UAEM)
—	DF	MEX	Érik Vera (on loan to Oaxaca)
—	MF	MEX	Néstor Calderón (unattached, previously on loan at Celaya)
—	MF	MEX	Alejandro Castro (unattached, previously on loan at Santos Laguna)
—	MF	MEX	Alejandro Zamudio (on loan to Puebla)

=== Veracruz ===
In: Note: Flags indicate national team as defined under FIFA eligibility rules; some limited exceptions apply. Players may hold more than one non-FIFA nationality.

No.	Pos.	Nation	Player
2	DF	BRA	Fabrício (from (Brazil) Guarani)
5	DF	MEX	Carlos Salcido (from Guadalajara)
9	FW	TUR	Colin Kazim-Richards (on loan from (Brazil) Corinthians, previously on loan at BUAP)
12	GK	MEX	Julio González (on loan from Santos Laguna, previously on loan at Tampico Madero)
14	MF	URU	Sebastián Rodríguez (from (Uruguay) Nacional)
16	DF	MEX	Lampros Kontogiannis (from (Peru) Real Garcilaso)
17	MF	USA	Rodrigo López (on loan from Celaya)
27	MF	BRA	Nenê Bonilha (from (Portugal) Vitória de Setúbal, previously on loan at (Brazil) Fortaleza)
30	DF	MEX	Edson García (on loan from Atlas)
31	DF	MEX	Cristian González (on loan from Atlas)
33	DF	MEX	Carlos Gutiérrez (on loan from Puebla, previously on loan at Oaxaca)
—	DF	PER	Iván Santillán (on loan from (Peru) Real Garcilaso)

Out: Note: Flags indicate national team as defined under FIFA eligibility rules; some limited exceptions apply. Players may hold more than one non-FIFA nationality.

No.	Pos.	Nation	Player
1	GK	PER	Pedro Gallese (on loan to (Peru) Alianza Lima)
5	DF	ARG	Guido Milán (unattached)
7	MF	MEX	Carlos Esquivel (loan return to Toluca)
9	FW	ARG	Lautaro Rinaldi (to (Peru) Universidad de San Martín)
14	DF	ARG	Rodrigo Noya (on loan to Oaxaca)
16	DF	PER	Wilder Cartagena (loan return to (Peru) Universidad de San Martín)
17	MF	MEX	Hibert Ruiz (loan return to Morelia)
18	DF	MEX	Osmar Mares (loan return to América)
19	MF	MEX	Hugo Cid (unattached)
24	DF	MEX	José Arturo Rivas (loan return to UANL)
27	DF	MEX	Carlos Castro (to Orizaba)
—	GK	PER	Carlos Cáceda (on loan to (Peru) Melgar, previously on loan at (Peru) Real Garcilaso)
—	GK	MEX	Leonín Pineda (unattached, previously on loan at Tampico Madero)
—	DF	MEX	Leobardo López (on loan to Zacatepec, previously on loan at Necaxa)
—	MF	MEX	Édgar Andrade (unattached, previously on loan at Tapachula)
—	MF	MEX	Mitchel Oviedo (unattached, previously on loan at Celaya)
—	MF	MEX	Luis Sánchez (on loan to Venados, previously on loan at Celaya)

== Ascenso MX ==
=== Atlante ===
In: Note: Flags indicate national team as defined under FIFA eligibility rules; some limited exceptions apply. Players may hold more than one non-FIFA nationality.

No.	Pos.	Nation	Player
2	DF	MEX	Carlos Calvo (loan return from Toluca)
3	DF	MEX	Gerardo Venegas (on loan from Puebla, previously on loan at Oaxaca)
9	FW	BRA	Chico (from Inter Playa del Carmen)
14	DF	MEX	Juan Pablo Juárez (on loan from América)
17	DF	COL	Juan Giraldo (from (Colombia) Deportivo Cali)
18	MF	MEX	Simón Alejandro Rodríguez (on loan from UANL)
23	DF	URU	Emilio MacEachen (from (Uruguay) Peñarol)
26	MF	MEX	Jhory Celaya (on loan from UANL)
27	FW	CMR	Patrick Soko (on loan from Atlas)
34	MF	MEX	Wilberth Echeverría (from Inter Playa del Carmen)
—	MF	COL	Brayam Nazarit (from Matamoros)

Out: Note: Flags indicate national team as defined under FIFA eligibility rules; some limited exceptions apply. Players may hold more than one non-FIFA nationality.

No.	Pos.	Nation	Player
3	DF	USA	Jesús Vázquez (loan return to UANL)
14	MF	MEX	Baruch Luna (loan return to Necaxa)
16	FW	COL	José Gabriel Rodríguez (on loan to Cancún)
17	MF	USA	Adrián Villa (unattached)
18	DF	PAR	Álex Garcete (unattached)
23	FW	MEX	Donato Estala (loan return to UAEM)
26	MF	MEX	Jesús Cruz (on loan to Cancún)
27	MF	MEX	César Loria (unattached)
34	DF	MEX	Irving Zurita (on loan to Atlas)
—	DF	MEX	Cuauhtémoc Domínguez (on loan to Cancún, previously on loan at Venados)
—	MF	MEX	Arturo Avilés (on loan to Yalmakán, previously on loan at Tabasco)
—	MF	MEX	Francisco Javier Estrada (on loan to Cancún)
—	MF	MEX	Fernando Herrera (unattached, previously on loan at Tampico Madero)
—	MF	MEX	Javier Sánchez (unattached, previously on loan at Cancún)
—	MF	MEX	Óscar Uscanga (unattached, previously on loan at Tampico Madero)
—	FW	MEX	Alberto García (to Tampico Madero)

=== Atlético San Luis ===
In: Note: Flags indicate national team as defined under FIFA eligibility rules; some limited exceptions apply. Players may hold more than one non-FIFA nationality.

No.	Pos.	Nation	Player
28	MF	MEX	Dionicio Escalante (from (Spain) Cultural Leonesa)
32	MF	ARG	Óscar Benítez (on loan from (Portugal) Benfica, previously on loan at (Argentina) Argentinos Juniors)
33	DF	MEX	Mario de Luna (on loan from Guadalajara)

Out: Note: Flags indicate national team as defined under FIFA eligibility rules; some limited exceptions apply. Players may hold more than one non-FIFA nationality.

No.	Pos.	Nation	Player
16	DF	MEX	Luis Gerardo Ramírez (on loan to Tepatitlán)
—	MF	MEX	Felipe Ponce (on loan to UAEM, previously on loan at (Colombia) Boyacá Chicó)

=== Celaya ===
In: Note: Flags indicate national team as defined under FIFA eligibility rules; some limited exceptions apply. Players may hold more than one non-FIFA nationality.

No.	Pos.	Nation	Player
1	GK	MEX	Aarón Fernández (on loan from UANL)
2	DF	MEX	Luis Lozoya (re-loan from Santos Laguna)
4	DF	MEX	Abraham Riestra (re-signed)
8	MF	CHI	Sergio Riffo (from Irapuato)
11	MF	MEX	Michelle Benítez (on loan from Guadalajara, previously on loan at Zacatepec)
12	FW	ESP	Samuel Goñi (from (United States) Golden State Force)
14	MF	COL	Marlon Sierra (re-signed)
15	MF	MEX	Carlos Camacho (on loan from América, previously on loan at Necaxa)
18	DF	MEX	Franz Torres (re-signed)
19	MF	MEX	Irving Ávalos (on loan from Juárez)
24	DF	MEX	Juan Carlos García (on loan from Cruz Azul, previously on loan at UAT)
27	FW	COL	Brayan Moreno (re-signed)
35	GK	MEX	Nemer Lajud (re-loan from Sinaloa)

Out: Note: Flags indicate national team as defined under FIFA eligibility rules; some limited exceptions apply. Players may hold more than one non-FIFA nationality.

No.	Pos.	Nation	Player
1	MF	MEX	Luis Sánchez (loan return to Veracruz)
3	DF	MEX	Carlos Galeana (loan return to Toluca)
8	MF	USA	Rodrigo López (on loan to Veracruz)
10	MF	MEX	Rodolfo Salinas (loan return to Atlas)
11	MF	MEX	Mitchel Oviedo (loan return to Veracruz)
13	MF	MEX	Ángel Reyna (unattached)
14	MF	COL	William Palacio (loan return to UANL)
15	FW	MEX	Martín Abundis (loan return to Toluca)
19	MF	MEX	Néstor Calderón (loan return to UNAM)
20	MF	MEX	Kevin Favela (on loan to Irapuato)
21	FW	COL	William Arboleda (to (Colombia) Independiente Medellín)
23	DF	MEX	Carlos Ramos (loan return to Necaxa)
24	FW	MEX	Dante Osorio (loan return to UAEM)
28	GK	MEX	Ricardo Roldán (unattached)
33	MF	ARG	Bautista Bernuncio (unattached)
34	DF	URU	Mario Risso (unattached)
—	FW	MEX	Guillermo Clemens (to Tapachula, previously on loan at (El Salvador) Sonsonate)

=== Juárez ===
In: Note: Flags indicate national team as defined under FIFA eligibility rules; some limited exceptions apply. Players may hold more than one non-FIFA nationality.

No.	Pos.	Nation	Player
8	MF	URU	Leonardo Pais (from (Uruguay) Torque)
17	MF	MEX	Flavio Santos (on loan from Atlas, previously on loan at Oaxaca)
21	DF	BRA	Massari (from Tapachula)
23	MF	URU	Joaquín Noy (on loan from (Uruguay) Montevideo Wanderers)

Out: Note: Flags indicate national team as defined under FIFA eligibility rules; some limited exceptions apply. Players may hold more than one non-FIFA nationality.

No.	Pos.	Nation	Player
8	MF	BRA	Matheuzinho (to (Brazil) Atlético Goianiense)
17	DF	BRA	Magal (unattached)
21	MF	MEX	Irving Ávalos (on loan to Celaya)
23	FW	MEX	Rodrigo Prieto (loan return to Necaxa)
29	MF	MEX	Jhonatan Aranda (loan return to UANL)
202	MF	MEX	Simón Alejandro Rodríguez (loan return to UANL)

=== Oaxaca ===
In: Note: Flags indicate national team as defined under FIFA eligibility rules; some limited exceptions apply. Players may hold more than one non-FIFA nationality.

No.	Pos.	Nation	Player
3	DF	MEX	Ángel Villegas (loan return from UACH)
4	DF	ARG	Rodrigo Noya (on loan from Veracruz)
5	DF	PAR	Alexis Doldán (from (Paraguay) Fulgencio Yegros)
11	FW	PAR	Enzo Prono (from (India) Aizawl)
15	DF	MEX	Érik Vera (on loan from UNAM)
20	MF	MEX	Juan Carlos López (on loan from Querétaro)
28	MF	BRA	Esquerdinha (from (Brazil) Ferroviário, previously on loan at (Brazil) Juventude)
33	FW	MEX	Omar Islas (on loan from UNAM)

Out: Note: Flags indicate national team as defined under FIFA eligibility rules; some limited exceptions apply. Players may hold more than one non-FIFA nationality.

No.	Pos.	Nation	Player
3	DF	ARG	Facundo Cardozo (to (Chile) Coquimbo Unido)
4	DF	MEX	Gerardo Venegas (loan return to Puebla)
5	DF	MEX	Richard Okunorobo (loan return to BUAP)
11	FW	MEX	Jerónimo Amione (loan return to Puebla)
15	MF	MEX	Diego Martínez (on loan to UAEM)
19	FW	MEX	Flavio Santos (loan return to Atlas)
22	DF	MEX	Bryan Colula (loan return to América)
26	DF	BRA	Marquinhos (loan return to UAEM)
28	FW	MEX	Ángel López (loan return to Monterrey)
31	GK	MEX	Alejandro Arana (loan return to Zacatepec)
32	DF	MEX	Jorge Sánchez (on loan to Irapuato)
33	MF	MEX	Carlos Gutiérrez (loan return to Puebla)
—	GK	MEX	Gerson Marín (on loan to UAEM, previously on loan at Zacatepec)
—	DF	ARG	Diego Menghi (to Atlético Venezuela, previously on loan at Tampico Madero)
—	FW	MEX	Jesús Moreno (unattached, previously on loan at UAT)

=== Sinaloa ===
In: Note: Flags indicate national team as defined under FIFA eligibility rules; some limited exceptions apply. Players may hold more than one non-FIFA nationality.

No.	Pos.	Nation	Player
3	DF	ARG	Gustavo Canto (on loan from Tijuana)
10	FW	ARG	Fabián Bordagaray (from (Argentina) Defensa y Justicia)
16	MF	ARG	Fernando Elizari (from (Malaysia) Johor Darul Ta'zim)
25	FW	MEX	Amaury Escoto (on loan from BUAP, previously on loan at Toluca)
35	FW	USA	Rubio Rubin (on loan from Tijuana)

Out: Note: Flags indicate national team as defined under FIFA eligibility rules; some limited exceptions apply. Players may hold more than one non-FIFA nationality.

No.	Pos.	Nation	Player
10	FW	ECU	Vinicio Angulo (to León)
24	DF	USA	Ángel Uribe (loan return to Tijuana)
35	MF	MEX	Ricardo Somera (unattached)
92	FW	MEX	Aarón Sicairos (on loan to Murciélagos)
97	FW	MEX	José Ángel Coronel (on loan to UdeC)
—	GK	MEX	Nemer Lajud (re-loan to Celaya)
—	GK	ARG	Cristian Campestrini (to (Chile) Everton)

=== Sonora ===
In: Note: Flags indicate national team as defined under FIFA eligibility rules; some limited exceptions apply. Players may hold more than one non-FIFA nationality.

No.	Pos.	Nation	Player
3	DF	MEX	Sergio Vázquez (on loan from Querétaro)
8	DF	MEX	Érick Espinosa (on loan from Querétaro)
15	MF	MEX	Jesús Medina (on loan from Querétaro)
16	FW	MEX	Jonathan Vega (on loan from UANL)
18	DF	MEX	Alfonso Zúñiga (on loan from Querétaro)
19	DF	MEX	Antonio Cortés (on loan from Querétaro)
22	DF	MEX	Mario Quezada (on loan from Toluca, previously on loan at Zacatepec)
23	MF	MEX	Salvador Reyes (on loan from Morelia)
28	DF	MEX	Martín Orozco (on loan from Querétaro)

Out: Note: Flags indicate national team as defined under FIFA eligibility rules; some limited exceptions apply. Players may hold more than one non-FIFA nationality.

No.	Pos.	Nation	Player
2	DF	MEX	Ricardo Peña (loan return to Querétaro)
16	FW	MEX	Ronaldo Herrera (loan return to Querétaro)
18	MF	MEX	Bernardo López (on loan to Murciélagos)
20	DF	USA	Josué Soto (loan return to Querétaro)
21	FW	MEX	Obayram Reyes (loan return to Querétaro)
22	DF	MEX	Martín Torres (unattached)
88	MF	MEX	Cristian Quiñones (loan return to Querétaro)
90	DF	MEX	Diego Guzmán (loan return to Querétaro)

=== Tampico Madero ===
In: Note: Flags indicate national team as defined under FIFA eligibility rules; some limited exceptions apply. Players may hold more than one non-FIFA nationality.

No.	Pos.	Nation	Player
1	GK	MEX	Christian López (from Tepatitlán de Morelos)
3	DF	MEX	Jorge González (on loan from Santos Laguna)
4	DF	MEX	Gaddi Aguirre (on loan from Atlas)
5	MF	URU	Ángel Cayetano (from (Uruguay) Racing de Montevideo)
9	FW	MEX	Diego Jiménez (on loan from BUAP)
11	FW	MEX	Eduardo Pérez (on loan from Puebla)
12	GK	URU	Yonatan Irrazábal (from (Uruguay) Cerro)
21	MF	MEX	Víctor Guajardo (on loan from Morelia, previously on loan at Venados)
22	DF	BRA	João Gabriel (from (Saudi Arabia) Al-Batin)
23	MF	MEX	Luis Márquez (on loan from Guadalajara, previously on loan at Zacatepec)
25	FW	MEX	Stefano Rodríguez (from Murciélagos)
29	FW	MEX	Alberto García (from Atlante)
31	MF	MEX	Fabián Salas (from Orgullo Surtam)
32	MF	MEX	Manuel Alvarado (from Orgullo Surtam)

Out: Note: Flags indicate national team as defined under FIFA eligibility rules; some limited exceptions apply. Players may hold more than one non-FIFA nationality.

No.	Pos.	Nation	Player
2	DF	BRA	Betão (unattached)
5	DF	ARG	Diego Menghi (loan return to Oaxaca)
9	FW	MEX	Eduardo Aguirre (loan return to Santos Laguna)
21	FW	MEX	Diego Castellanos (on loan to UAEM)
22	GK	MEX	Leonín Pineda (loan return to Veracruz)
23	GK	MEX	Julio González (loan return to Santos Laguna)
25	MF	MEX	Ángel Andrade (on loan to Matamoros)
31	MF	MEX	Óscar Uscanga (loan return to Atlante)
32	MF	MEX	Fernando Herrera (loan return to Atlante)
34	MF	CRC	Mynor Escoe (to (Costa Rica) Herediano)

=== Tapachula ===
In: Note: Flags indicate national team as defined under FIFA eligibility rules; some limited exceptions apply. Players may hold more than one non-FIFA nationality.

No.	Pos.	Nation	Player
6	MF	MEX	Néstor Olguín (from UAT)
8	FW	BRA	Rafinha (from (Brazil) Avaí)
11	FW	COL	Franco Arizala (from (Qatar) Al-Arabi)
16	MF	MEX	Ángelo Costanzo (re-signed)
20	FW	MEX	Guillermo Clemens (from Celaya, previously on loan at (El Salvador) Sonsonate)
21	FW	URU	Martín Alaniz (from (Ecuador) Guayaquil City, previously on loan at (Israel) Hapoel Ra'anana)
24	MF	MEX	Iván Cueto (from UNACH)
26	MF	MEX	Diego de la Torre (re-signed)
34	DF	MEX	Fernando Gaxiola (from Orizaba)

Out: Note: Flags indicate national team as defined under FIFA eligibility rules; some limited exceptions apply. Players may hold more than one non-FIFA nationality.

No.	Pos.	Nation	Player
6	DF	BRA	Massari (to Juárez)
8	MF	MEX	David Sánchez (to UAT)
9	FW	ARG	Diego Diellos (to (Chile) Rangers)
16	MF	MEX	Alfonso Tamay (loan return to UANL)
18	FW	MEX	Roberto Mendoza (loan return to Atlas)
19	FW	NGR	Afolabi Julius (unattached)
20	DF	MEX	Félix Araujo (unattached)
21	DF	MEX	Adrián Caballero (loan return to Querétaro)
23	FW	MEX	Brayan Villalobos (loan return to Atlas)
24	MF	MEX	Daniel Jiménez (on loan to Tuxtla)
25	MF	VEN	Luis Martell (unattached)
30	MF	MEX	Édgar Andrade (loan return to Veracruz)
—	DF	MEX	Carlos Utrilla (on loan to Tuxtla, previously on loan at Matamoros)

=== UAEM ===
In: Note: Flags indicate national team as defined under FIFA eligibility rules; some limited exceptions apply. Players may hold more than one non-FIFA nationality.

No.	Pos.	Nation	Player
1	GK	MEX	Gerson Marín (on loan from Oaxaca, previously on loan at Zacatepec)
4	DF	MEX	Abraham Torres Nilo (on loan from Pachuca, previously on loan at Zacatepec)
11	FW	MEX	Dante Osorio (loan return from Celaya)
15	MF	MEX	Daniel Hernández (on loan from Atlas)
16	DF	MEX	Enrique Manica (re-signed)
19	MF	MEX	Alejandro García (on loan from Monterrey)
25	MF	MEX	Jesús Leal (on loan from León)
26	FW	MEX	Diego Castellanos (on loan from Tampico Madero)
28	MF	MEX	Moisés Velasco (on loan from Toluca, previously on loan at UAT)
29	FW	MEX	Juan Gutiérrez (loan return from UACH)
30	MF	MEX	Diego Martínez (on loan from Oaxaca)
32	DF	MEX	Eduardo Castillo (on loan from Pachuca)
33	MF	MEX	Carlos Amarildo (re-signed)
—	MF	MEX	Felipe Ponce (on loan from Atlético San Luis, previously on loan at (Colombia) Boyacá Chicó)

Out: Note: Flags indicate national team as defined under FIFA eligibility rules; some limited exceptions apply. Players may hold more than one non-FIFA nationality.

No.	Pos.	Nation	Player
1	GK	MEX	Héctor Estrada (loan return to UANL)
4	DF	COL	Armando Nieves (loan return to UdeG)
11	MF	MEX	Héctor Eugui (unattached)
15	DF	MEX	Francisco Macías (loan return to Toluca)
16	DF	MEX	Francisco Reyes (loan return to UNAM)
19	MF	MEX	Sergio Ceballos (loan return to Santos Laguna)
30	FW	URU	Gonzalo da Luz (unattached)
32	FW	ARG	Héctor Arrigo (unattached)
—	DF	BRA	Marquinhos (unattached, previously on loan at Oaxaca)
—	FW	MEX	Donato Estala (unattached, previously on loan at Atlante)

=== UAT ===
In: Note: Flags indicate national team as defined under FIFA eligibility rules; some limited exceptions apply. Players may hold more than one non-FIFA nationality.

No.	Pos.	Nation	Player
2	DF	URU	Darwin Torres (from (Uruguay) Cerro)
4	DF	MEX	Cristian Torres (on loan from León)
5	MF	URU	Nicolás Prieto (from (Uruguay) Danubio)
7	MF	MEX	Omar Tejeda (on loan from BUAP)
9	FW	MEX	Claudio González (on loan from León)
14	MF	MEX	Daniel Amador (on loan from UdeG)
19	DF	MEX	Ignacio González (on loan from Morelia)
25	MF	MEX	David Sánchez (from Tapachula)
28	DF	MEX	José Medina (on loan from Necaxa)
104	MF	COL	Esneyder Mena (on loan from UANL, previously on loan at (Colombia) Patriotas Boyacá)

Out: Note: Flags indicate national team as defined under FIFA eligibility rules; some limited exceptions apply. Players may hold more than one non-FIFA nationality.

No.	Pos.	Nation	Player
1	GK	MEX	Darío Romo (loan return to Querétaro)
4	DF	MEX	Juan Carlos García (loan return to Cruz Azul)
7	MF	MEX	Moisés Velasco (loan return to Toluca)
9	FW	MEX	Jesús Moreno (loan return to Oaxaca)
11	FW	BRA	Richard Luca (loan return to UANL)
12	MF	MEX	William Guzmán (loan return to Guadalajara)
14	MF	MEX	Cándido Ramírez (loan return to Monterrey)
18	DF	URU	Diego Barboza (loan return to Montevideo Wanderers)
19	DF	MEX	César Ibáñez (loan return to Santos Laguna)
30	FW	COL	Gustavo Culma (loan return to Necaxa)
—	DF	MEX	Néstor Olguín (to Tapachula)

=== UdeG ===
In: Note: Flags indicate national team as defined under FIFA eligibility rules; some limited exceptions apply. Players may hold more than one non-FIFA nationality.

No.	Pos.	Nation	Player
24	DF	MEX	Rodrigo Godínez (on loan from BUAP)

Out: Note: Flags indicate national team as defined under FIFA eligibility rules; some limited exceptions apply. Players may hold more than one non-FIFA nationality.

No.	Pos.	Nation	Player
11	MF	MEX	Daniel Amador (on loan to UAT)
33	DF	MEX	Néstor Vidrio (loan return to Guadalajara)
—	DF	COL	Armando Nieves (to (Guatemala) Malacateco, previously on loan at UAEM)

=== Venados ===
In: Note: Flags indicate national team as defined under FIFA eligibility rules; some limited exceptions apply. Players may hold more than one non-FIFA nationality.

No.	Pos.	Nation	Player
2	DF	MEX	Bryan Colula (on loan from América, previously on loan at Oaxaca)
3	DF	MEX	Carlos Galeana (on loan from Toluca, previously on loan at Celaya)
6	DF	MEX	Carlos Ramos (on loan from Necaxa, previously on loan at Celaya)
9	FW	ARG	Alan Murialdo (from (Peru) Sport Rosario)
13	MF	MEX	Alfonso Tamay (on loan from UANL, previously on loan at Tapachula)
17	MF	MEX	Francisco Uscanga (on loan from Querétaro)
20	FW	COL	Gustavo Cañizales (from (Colombia) Deportes Tolima)
21	MF	MEX	Luis Sánchez (on loan from Veracruz, previously on loan at Celaya)
25	GK	MEX	Rafael Ramírez (on loan from Zacatecas, previously on loan at Tecos)
33	MF	ARG	Exequiel Márquez (from (Paraguay) Tembetary)

Out: Note: Flags indicate national team as defined under FIFA eligibility rules; some limited exceptions apply. Players may hold more than one non-FIFA nationality.

No.	Pos.	Nation	Player
2	DF	MEX	Cuauhtémoc Domínguez (loan return to Atlante)
3	MF	MEX	Víctor Guajardo (loan return to Morelia)
6	MF	ARG	Leandro Navarro (unattached)
9	FW	ARG	Alexis Blanco (unattached)
13	GK	MEX	Gustavo Alcalá (loan return to UNAM)
17	FW	MEX	Jahir Barraza (loan return to Atlas)
21	MF	MEX	Emmanuel Villafaña (on loan to Cancún)
33	DF	ARG	Braian Molina (to (Chile) Ñublense)

=== Zacatecas ===
In: Note: Flags indicate national team as defined under FIFA eligibility rules; some limited exceptions apply. Players may hold more than one non-FIFA nationality.

No.	Pos.	Nation	Player
17	MF	MEX	Héctor Mascorro (on loan from Pachuca, previously on loan at León)
24	MF	MEX	Manuel Pérez (on loan from América)
29	DF	MEX	Miguel Velázquez (on loan from Pachuca, previously on loan at León)
28	MF	MEX	Erick Sánchez (on loan from Pachuca)

Out: Note: Flags indicate national team as defined under FIFA eligibility rules; some limited exceptions apply. Players may hold more than one non-FIFA nationality.

No.	Pos.	Nation	Player
13	MF	MEX	Jesús Zavala (to Puebla)
14	DF	MEX	Gabriel Báez (on loan to Tlaxcala)
17	FW	CHI	Sergio Vergara (loan return to Pachuca)
84	MF	MEX	Óscar Gómez (on loan to Tuxtla)
93	DF	MEX	César Hinojosa (on loan to Tuxtla)
95	FW	MEX	Fernando Villalpando (on loan to Tuxtla)
—	GK	MEX	Rafael Ramírez (on loan to Venados, previously on loan at Tecos)
—	MF	MEX	Marco Argüelles (unattached, previously on loan at Zacatepec)
—	MF	ARG	Julián Cardozo (on loan to Zacatepec)

=== Zacatepec ===
In: Note: Flags indicate national team as defined under FIFA eligibility rules; some limited exceptions apply. Players may hold more than one non-FIFA nationality.

No.	Pos.	Nation	Player
1	GK	MEX	Alejandro Arana (loan return from Oaxaca)
5	MF	MEX	Rodolfo Salinas (on loan from Atlas, previously on loan at Celaya)
6	DF	BRA	Elbis (on loan from Pachuca)
7	FW	ARG	Ramiro Fergonzi (from (Colombia) Patriotas Boyacá)
8	FW	MEX	Rodrigo Prieto (on loan from Necaxa, previously on loan at Juárez)
10	MF	MEX	Giovani Hernández (on loan from Guadalajara, previously on loan at Necaxa)
11	MF	ARG	Julián Cardozo (on loan from Zacatecas)
13	DF	MEX	Leobardo López (on loan from Veracruz, previously on loan at Necaxa)
14	DF	MEX	Héctor Reynoso (on loan from Guadalajara)
15	DF	MEX	José Luis Hernández (on loan from América, previously on loan at Necaxa)
19	FW	MEX	Cristian Ortiz (on loan from Guadalajara)
21	MF	COL	Andrés Berrio (on loan from Necaxa)
22	MF	MEX	Zahid Muñoz (on loan from Guadalajara)
31	FW	ECU	José Javier Cortez (from (Ecuador) Galácticos)
33	FW	MEX	César Huerta (on loan from Guadalajara)

Out: Note: Flags indicate national team as defined under FIFA eligibility rules; some limited exceptions apply. Players may hold more than one non-FIFA nationality.

No.	Pos.	Nation	Player
1	GK	MEX	Gerson Marín (loan return to Oaxaca)
5	DF	MEX	Alfonso Rippa (unattached)
6	MF	MEX	Marco Argüelles (loan return to Zacatecas)
7	MF	MEX	Óscar Macías (loan return to Guadalajara)
8	MF	MEX	Juan de Dios Hernández (unattached)
10	MF	MEX	Luis Márquez (loan return to Guadalajara)
11	MF	MEX	Michelle Benítez (loan return to Guadalajara)
13	DF	MEX	Abraham Torres Nilo (loan return to Pachuca)
14	FW	MEX	Kevin Chaurand (loan return to Necaxa)
15	DF	MEX	José Peralta (loan return to Guadalajara)
21	DF	MEX	Mario Quezada (loan return to Toluca)
22	MF	MEX	Jonathan Valdivia (loan return to Necaxa)
29	FW	MEX	Ronaldo Cisneros (loan return to Guadalajara)
32	MF	MEX	Kevin Ramírez (loan return to Guadalajara)
