= 2019–20 C.D. Veracruz season =

Veracruz
2019–20 season
- Chairman: Jorge Urdiales
- Manager: Enrique Meza (until 27 August); José Luis González China (29 August to 3 September); Enrique López Zarza (from 4 September)
- Stadium: Estadio Luis "Pirata" Fuente
- Apertura: 19th
- Highest home attendance: 18,940 (vs Cruz Azul, 13 September 2019)
- Lowest home attendance: 7,322 (vs Querétaro, 27 August 2019)
- Average home league attendance: 14,458
- Biggest defeat: Necaxa 7–0 Veracruz (3 August 2018)
- All statistics correct as of 16 September 2019.

The 2019–20 C.D. Veracruz season was the 76th (and final) season in the football club's history and the 7th consecutive season in the top flight of Mexican football.

== Coaching staff ==
Position	Name
Head coach	(Mexico) Enrique López Zarza
Assistant coaches	(Mexico) José Luis González China
Assistant coaches	(Argentina) Luis Scatolaro
Kinesiologist	(Mexico) Paolo Arriaga
Doctor	(Mexico) Juan José Pérez

== Players ==
=== Squad information ===
No.	Pos.	Nat.	Name	Date of birth (age)	Signed in	Previous club
Goalkeepers
1	GK	(Mexico)	Sebastián Jurado	28 September 1998 (aged 20)	2018	(Mexico) Youth system
13	GK	(Mexico)	Melitón Hernández	15 October 1982 (aged 36)	2013	(Mexico) León
Defenders
3	DF	(Colombia)	Leiton Jiménez (Captain)	26 April 1989 (aged 30)	2018	(Mexico) BUAP
4	DF	(Mexico)	Lampros Kontogiannis	1 August 1988 (aged 30)	2019 (Winter)	(Peru) Real Garcilaso
5	DF	(Mexico)	Carlos Salcido	2 April 1980 (aged 39)	2019 (Winter)	(Mexico) Guadalajara
20	DF	(Mexico)	Luis Lozoya	10 April 1992 (aged 27)	2019	(Mexico) Celaya
23	DF	(Mexico)	Leobardo López	4 September 1983 (aged 35)	2019	(Mexico) Zacatepec
28	DF	(Mexico)	Jesús Paganoni	24 September 1988 (aged 30)	2015	(Mexico) Atlas
32	DF	(Mexico)	Francisco Flores	17 January 1994 (aged 25)	2019	(Mexico) Zacatepec
33	DF	(Mexico)	Carlos Gutiérrez	3 February 1990 (aged 29)	2019	(Mexico) Oaxaca
Midfielders
6	MF	(Mexico)	Luis Antonio Martínez	29 April 1987 (aged 32)	2013	(Mexico) La Piedad
7	MF	(Chile)	Bryan Carrasco	31 January 1991 (aged 28)	2018	(Chile) Audax Italiano
8	MF	(United States)	Rodrigo López	10 May 1987 (aged 32)	2019 (Winter)	(Mexico) Celaya
10	MF	(Mexico)	Ángel Reyna	19 September 1984 (aged 34)	2019	Unattached
14	MF	(Uruguay)	Sebastián Rodríguez	16 August 1992 (aged 26)	2019 (Winter)	(Uruguay) Nacional
15	MF	(Peru)	Iván Santillán	6 May 1990 (aged 29)	2019 (Winter)	(Peru) Real Garcilaso
21	MF	(Spain)	Abraham González	16 July 1985 (aged 34)	2019	(Mexico) BUAP
22	MF	(Mexico)	Diego Chávez	11 May 1995 (aged 24)	2017	(Mexico) Juárez
Forwards
9	FW	(Turkey)	Colin Kazim-Richards	26 August 1986 (aged 32)	2018	(Mexico) BUAP
11	FW	(Argentina)	Cristian Menéndez	2 April 1988 (aged 31)	2017	(Argentina) Atlético Tucumán
17	FW	(Argentina)	Daniel Villalva	6 July 1992 (aged 27)	2019 (Winter)	(Mexico) Querétaro

Players and squad numbers last updated on 26 July 2019.
Note: Flags indicate national team as has been defined under FIFA eligibility rules. Players may hold more than one non-FIFA nationality.

== Transfers ==
=== In ===
N	Pos.	Nat.	Name	Age	Moving from	Type	Transfer window	Source
3	DF	(Colombia)	Leiton Jiménez	26 April 1989 (aged 30)	BUAP	Transfer	Summer	
10	MF	(Mexico)	Ángel Reyna	19 September 1984 (aged 34)	Unattached	Transfer	Summer	
20	DF	(Mexico)	Luis Lozoya	10 April 1992 (aged 27)	Celaya	Transfer	Summer	
21	MF	(Spain)	Abraham González	16 July 1985 (aged 34)	BUAP	Loan	Summer	
23	DF	(Mexico)	Leobardo López	4 September 1983 (aged 35)	Zacatepec	Loan return	Summer	
32	DF	(Mexico)	Francisco Flores	17 January 1994 (aged 25)	Cancún	Transfer	Summer	

=== Out ===
N	Pos.	Nat.	Name	Age	Moving to	Type	Transfer window	Source
14	DF	(Mexico)	Rodrigo Noya	31 January 1990 (aged 29)	Necaxa	Transfer	Summer	
21	MF	(Uruguay)	Adrián Luna	12 April 1992 (aged 27)	(Australia) Melbourne City	End of contract	Summer	

== Competitions ==
=== Overview ===
Competition	First match	Last match	Starting round	Record							
Competition	First match	Last match	Starting round	Pld	W	D	L	GF	GA	GD	Win %
Torneo Apertura	26 July 2019		Matchday 1	8	0	2	6	5	22	−17	0.00
Copa MX			Group stage	0	0	0	0	0	0	+0	—
Torneo Clausura			Matchday 1	0	0	0	0	0	0	+0	—
Total				8	0	2	6	5	22	−17	0.00

Last updated: 16 September 2019
Source: Mediotiempo.com

=== Torneo Apertura ===
==== League table ====
Pos	Team	Pld	W	D	L	GF	GA	GD	Pts	Qualification or relegation
15	Atlético San Luis	18	6	2	10	22	31	−9	20	
16	Juárez	18	5	3	10	17	27	−10	18	
17	Toluca	18	4	5	9	16	26	−10	17	
18	Puebla	18	4	5	9	20	31	−11	17	
19	Veracruz (Note: Veracuz were disaffiliated by the Mexican Football Federation following various financial problems and incidents off the field. As a result, no club was relegated after the Clausura 2020. Relegation was originally intended to resume at the end of the 2020–21 season, however it was suspended for at least five years after the Ascenso MX was folded.) (D)	18	1	5	12	11	45	−34	8	Team disaffiliated by the FMF

Source: Liga MX
Rules for classification: 1) Points; 2) Goal difference; 3) Number of goals scored; 4) Head-to-head results between tied teams; 5) Number of goals scored away; 6) Highest relegation coefficient; 7) Fair Play points
(D) Disaffiliated

==== Results summary ====
Overall								Home						Away					
Pld	W	D	L	GF	GA	GD	Pts	W	D	L	GF	GA	GD	W	D	L	GF	GA	GD
18	1	5	12	11	45	−34	8	1	3	5	8	21	−13	0	2	7	3	24	−21

Last updated: 24 November 2019.
Source: LigaMX

==== Result round by round ====
Round	1	2	3	4	5	6	7	8	9	10	11	12	13	14	15	16	17	18
Ground	†	H	A	H	A	H	H	A	H	A	H	A	H	A	H	A	H	
Result	†	D	L	L	L	L	L	L	D	L	L	D	D	L	L	W	D	L
Position	19	9	19	19	19	19	19	19	19	19	19	19	19	19	19	19	19	19

Updated to match(es) played on 24 November 2019. Source: Mediotiempo.com
A = Away; H = Home; W = Win; D = Draw; L = Loss
Notes: † indicates team rested that round

==== Matches ====
26 July 2019 2	Veracruz	3–3	Pachuca	Boca del Río
21:00	Santillán 14'; Kazim-Richards 37'; Chávez 68'	Report	Jara 8'; Guzmán 51'; Copete 60'	Stadium: Estadio Luis "Pirata" Fuente; Attendance: 14,620; Referee: Fernando Hernández

3 August 2019 3	Necaxa	7–0	Veracruz	Aguascalientes City
21:05	Salas 11', 47'; Delgado 57'; Quiroga 66'; Angulo 74'; Herrera 83'; Calderón 85'	Report		Stadium: Estadio Victoria; Attendance: 12,846; Referee: Luis Enrique Santander

9 August 2019 4	Veracruz	1–2	Atlas	Boca del Río
21:05	Menéndez 10'	Report	Correa 53'; Martínez 76'	Stadium: Estadio Luis "Pirata" Fuente; Attendance: 14,614; Referee: César Arturo Ramos

18 August 2019 5	UNAM	2–0	Veracruz	Mexico City
12:00	Malcorra 63'; Angulo 68'	Report		Stadium: Estadio Olímpico Universitario; Attendance: 17,522; Referee: Roberto García Orozco

23 August 2019 6	Veracruz	1–2	Atlético San Luis	Boca del Río
19:00	Carrasco 45+4'	Report	González 44'; Castro 88'	Stadium: Estadio Luis "Pirata" Fuente; Attendance: 9,670; Referee: Jorge Isaac Rojas

27 August 2019 7	Veracruz	0–5	Querétaro	Boca del Río
19:00		Report	Ruiz 18'; Loba 36', 44'; Yrizar 60'; Escoboza 84'	Stadium: Estadio Luis "Pirata" Fuente; Attendance: 7,322; Referee: Fernando Guerrero

30 August 2019 8	Morelia	1–0	Veracruz	Morelia
19:00	Villafáñez 71'	Report		Stadium: Estadio Morelos; Attendance: 15,185; Referee: Erick Yair Miranda

13 September 2019 9	Veracruz	0–0	Cruz Azul	Boca del Río
21:00		Report		Stadium: Estadio Luis "Pirata" Fuente; Attendance: 18,940; Referee: Roberto García Orozco

22 September 2019 10	Juárez	2–0	Veracruz	Ciudad Juárez
17:00	Lezcano 23'; Sagal 34'	Report	Carlos Salcido (yellow card) 81'; Bryan Carrasco (yellow card) 84'	Stadium: Estadio Olímpico Benito Juárez; Referee: (Mexico) Marco Antonio Ortiz Nava

25 September 2019 11	Santos Laguna	5–0	Veracruz	Torreón
17:00	Castillo 18'; Orozco (yellow card) 45+2'; Dória 52'; Lozano 55'; Gorriarán (red card) 67'; Valdés 75'; Carlos Salcido 86' (o.g.)	Report		Stadium: Estadio Corona; Referee: (Mexico) Diego Montaño Robles

== Statistics ==
=== Squad statistics ===
No.	Pos	Nat	Player	Total		Apertura		Copa MX		Clausura	
No.	Pos	Nat	Player	Apps	Goals	Apps	Goals	Apps	Goals	Apps	Goals
1	GK	(Mexico)	Sebastián Jurado	8	0	8	0	0	0	0	0
3	DF	(Colombia)	Leiton Jiménez	2	0	2	0	0	0	0	0
4	DF	(Mexico)	Lampros Kontogiannis	6	0	6	0	0	0	0	0
5	DF	(Mexico)	Carlos Salcido	7	0	7	0	0	0	0	0
7	MF	(Chile)	Bryan Carrasco	8	1	8	1	0	0	0	0
8	MF	(United States)	Rodrigo López	2	0	2	0	0	0	0	0
9	FW	(Turkey)	Colin Kazim-Richards	3	1	3	1	0	0	0	0
10	MF	(Mexico)	Ángel Reyna	5	0	5	0	0	0	0	0
11	FW	(Argentina)	Cristian Menéndez	5	1	5	1	0	0	0	0
14	MF	(Uruguay)	Sebastián Rodríguez	7	0	7	0	0	0	0	0
15	MF	(Peru)	Iván Santillán	5	1	5	1	0	0	0	0
16	MF	(Argentina)	Gaspar Iñíguez	1	0	1	0	0	0	0	0
17	FW	(Argentina)	Daniel Villalva	8	0	8	0	0	0	0	0
18	MF	(Argentina)	Federico Illanes	2	0	2	0	0	0	0	0
19	MF	(Argentina)	Gabriel Peñalba	3	0	3	0	0	0	0	0
20	DF	(Mexico)	Luis Lozoya	5	0	5	0	0	0	0	0
21	MF	(Spain)	Abraham González	5	0	5	0	0	0	0	0
22	MF	(Mexico)	Diego Chávez	5	1	5	1	0	0	0	0
23	DF	(Mexico)	Leobardo López	6	0	6	0	0	0	0	0
28	DF	(Mexico)	Jesús Paganoni	8	0	8	0	0	0	0	0
33	DF	(Mexico)	Carlos Gutiérrez	6	0	6	0	0	0	0	0
34	DF	(Mexico)	Jesús Henestrosa	2	0	2	0	0	0	0	0
201	MF	(Mexico)	Raymundo Fulgencio	1	0	1	0	0	0	0	0
202	DF	(Mexico)	Luis Galicia	2	0	2	0	0	0	0	0

Last updated: 16 September 2019
Source: Mediotiempo.com

=== Goals ===
As of 16 September 2019

Rank	Player	Position	Apertura	Copa MX	Clausura	Total
1	(Chile) Bryan Carrasco	MF	1	0	0	1
1	(Mexico) Diego Chávez	MF	1	0	0	1
1	(Turkey) Colin Kazim-Richards	FW	1	0	0	1
1	(Argentina) Cristian Menéndez	FW	1	0	0	1
1	(Peru) Iván Santillán	MF	1	0	0	1

=== Clean sheets ===
As of 16 September 2019

Rank	Name	Apertura	Copa MX	Clausura	Total
1	(Mexico) Sebastián Jurado	1	0	0	1

=== Disciplinary record ===
N	P	Nat.	Name	Apertura			Copa MX			Total			Notes
N	P	Nat.	Name	Yellow card	Second yellow card	Red card	Yellow card	Second yellow card	Red card	Yellow card	Second yellow card	Red card	Notes
17	FW	(Argentina)	Daniel Villalva	3						3			
14	MF	(Uruguay)	Sebastián Rodríguez	2						2			
10	MF	(Mexico)	Ángel Reyna	2						2			
9	FW	(Turkey)	Colin Kazim-Richards	1						1			
28	DF	(Mexico)	Jesús Paganoni	1						1			
21	MF	(Spain)	Abraham González	1						1			
20	DF	(Mexico)	Luis Lozoya	1						1			
23	DF	(Mexico)	Leobardo López	1						1			

Last updated: 16 September 2019
Source: LigaMX
Only competitive matches
(yellow card) = Number of bookings; (second yellow card) = Number of sending offs after a second yellow card; (red card) = Number of sending offs by a direct red card.
