= Lutman =

Lutman may refer to:

- Carlos Camacho Lutman (born 1994), Mexican soccer player
- Lutman, Missouri, an extinct town
