= Carlos Camacho (disambiguation) =

Carlos Camacho (1924–1979) was the governor of Guam (1971–1975).

Carlos Camacho may also refer to:

- Carlos Camacho (actor) (born 1971), Colombian actor
- Carlos Camacho (footballer) (born 1994), Mexican footballer
- Carlos S. Camacho (born 1937), governor of the Northern Mariana Islands (1978–1982)
