= Errazquin =

Errazquin is a Spanish surname. Notable people with the surname include:

- Constantino Errazquin (1920–1992), Spanish footballer
- Jose Echenagusia Errazquin (1844–1912), Spanish painter
- Juan Errazquin (1906–1931), Spanish footballer
- Melchor de Santiago Concha y Errazquin (1716–1795), Creole magistrate and nobleman, colonial official in the Viceroyalty of Peru
