= Cristian Ortiz =

Cristian Ortiz may refer to:

- Cristian Ortíz (footballer, born 1999), Mexican football midfielder
- Cristian Ortiz (footballer, born 2007), Dominican football striker for the Tampa Bay Rowdies

== See also ==
- Cristina Ortiz (born 1950), Brazilian pianist
- Cristina Ortiz Rodríguez (1964–2016), known as "La Veneno", Spanish singer, actress, sex worker, and media personality
- Christian Ortiz (born 1992), Argentine football winger for Sport Recife
