= Carlos Martínez (footballer, born 1995) =

Mexican footballer (born 1995)

Personal information
- Full name: Carlos Eduardo Martínez Canales
- Date of birth: 1 August 1995
- Place of birth: Veracruz, Veracruz, Mexico
- Date of death: 17 August 2023 (aged 28)
- Place of death: Mexico City, Mexico
- Height: 1.77 m (5 ft 10 in)
- Position: Attacking midfielder

Youth career
- 2010–2012: Tulyehualco

Senior career*
Years	Team	Apps	(Gls)
2012–2018	BUAP	10	(0)
2018	Cocodrilos de Tabasco	6	(0)
2019	Tuxtla	17	(4)
2019–2020	Cruz Azul Hidalgo	11	(0)
2020	Industriales Naucalpan F.C.	0	(0)
- * Club domestic league appearances and goals as of 27 August 2019

Carlos Eduardo Martínez Canales (August 1, 1995 – August 17, 2023) was a Mexican professional footballer who played as an attacking midfielder.

== Personal life ==
Martínez was the brother of the professional football player, Román Martínez.

== Death ==
On August 17, 2023, Martínez died of a cardiac arrest.
