= Román Martínez (footballer, born 2002) =

Mexican footballer

Personal information
- Full name: Román Arturo Martínez Canales
- Date of birth: 18 August 2002 (age 24)
- Place of birth: Puebla, Mexico
- Height: 1.82 m (6 ft 0 in)
- Position: Forward

Team information
- Current team: Pioneros de Cancún
- Number: 9

Senior career*
Years	Team	Apps	(Gls)
2019–2024	América	7	(0)
2024	→ Tampico Madero (loan)	6	(0)
2025–	Pioneros de Cancún	7	(0)

International career^{‡}
2018	Mexico U17	3	(1)
- * Club domestic league appearances and goals as of 14 January 2026 ‡ National team caps and goals as of 28 August 2022

Román Arturo Martínez Canales (born 18 August 2002), also known as Mozumbito, is a Mexican professional footballer who plays as a forward for Liga Premier de México club Pioneros de Cancún.

== Personal life ==
Martínez was the brother of the professional football player Carlos Eduardo Martínez, who died on August 17, 2023.

== Career statistics ==
=== Club ===
As of 1 July 2023

Club	Season	League			Cup		Continental		Other		Total	
Club	Season	Division	Apps	Goals	Apps	Goals	Apps	Goals	Apps	Goals	Apps	Goals
América	2019–20	Liga MX	2	0	–		2 (Note: Appearances in CONCACAF Champions League)	0	–		4	0
América	2021–22	Liga MX	1	0	–		–		–		1	0
América	2022–23	Liga MX	3	0	–		–		–		3	0
América	2023–24	Liga MX	1	0	–		–		–		1	0
América	Total		7	0	–		2	0	0	0	9	0
Career total			7	0	0	0	2	0	0	0	9	0

== Honours ==
América

- Liga MX: Apertura 2023, Clausura 2024
- Campeón de Campeones: 2024
