= Abraham González (footballer) =

Spanish footballer

Abraham
Personal information
- Full name: Abraham González Casanova
- Date of birth: 16 July 1985 (age 41)
- Place of birth: Barcelona, Spain
- Height: 1.75 m (5 ft 9 in)
- Position: Midfielder

Youth career
- Ferrán Martorell
- 2002–2004: Terrassa

Senior career*
Years	Team	Apps	(Gls)
2004–2007	Terrassa	74	(3)
2007–2009	Barcelona B	67	(4)
2008–2009	Barcelona	1	(0)
2009–2010	Cádiz	32	(2)
2010–2011	Gimnàstic	4	(0)
2011	→ Ponferradina (loan)	17	(0)
2011–2013	Alcorcón	65	(2)
2013–2016	Espanyol	63	(2)
2016–2019	UNAM	67	(6)
2018–2019	→ BUAP (loan)	34	(0)
2019	→ Veracruz (loan)	13	(0)
2020–2022	AEK Larnaca	28	(3)
2022	Ethnikos Achna	12	(1)
2022–2023	Akritas Chlorakas	38	(2)
Total		515	(25)

International career
2006	Catalonia	1	(0)
- * Club domestic league appearances and goals

Abraham González Casanova (born 16 July 1985), known simply as Abraham, is a Spanish former professional footballer who played as a central midfielder.

== Club career ==
Born in Barcelona, Catalonia, Abraham made his professional debut with local Terrassa FC. He appeared in 16 matches during the 2004–05 season in the Segunda División, which ended in relegation.

Two years later, Abraham was transferred to neighbouring FC Barcelona, being immediately assigned to their reserve side who competed in the Tercera División. He made his debut for the first team in the Copa del Rey tie against Benidorm CF (1–0 win) on 28 October 2008. In the last round of La Liga, as Barça were already champions, he came on as a 76th-minute substitute for Xavi in a 1–1 draw at Deportivo de La Coruña.

Abraham was released by Barcelona in the summer of 2009, joining Cádiz CF who had just returned to the second division after a one-year absence. He appeared regularly for the Andalusians, who were immediately relegated.

Abraham signed with Gimnàstic de Tarragona for the 2010–11 campaign, but failed to impress at his new club. In the following transfer window he was loaned to fellow second-tier side SD Ponferradina, eventually suffering another relegation.

On 15 July 2011, Abraham joined AD Alcorcón also in the second division. He was a starter for most of his spell (missing promotion in the play-offs on both occasions), then moved to La Liga on a three-year contract at RCD Espanyol.

Abraham scored his first goal in the Spanish top flight on 27 February 2015, the game's only in a home victory over Córdoba CF. On 17 June 2016, after three seasons with an average of 21 league appearances, the 30-year-old moved abroad for the first time in his career, signing with Pumas UNAM from the Liga MX as a free agent.

During his spell at Pumas, Abraham was loaned to fellow Mexicans Lobos BUAP and C.D. Veracruz. He was coached by Francisco Palencia at all sides but the third.

Abraham closed out his career aged 38, after three and a half seasons in the Cypriot First Division with AEK Larnaca FC, Ethnikos Achna FC and Akritas Chlorakas.

== Career statistics ==
Club	Season	League			Cup		Other		Total	
Club	Season	Division	Apps	Goals	Apps	Goals	Apps	Goals	Apps	Goals
Terrassa	2004–05	Segunda División	16	1	2	1	—	—	18	2
Terrassa	2005–06	Segunda División B	26	2	1	0	—	—	27	2
Terrassa	2006–07	Segunda División B	32	0	1	0	—	—	33	0
Terrassa	Total		74	3	4	1	—	—	78	4
Barcelona B	2007–08	Tercera División	38	2	—	—	—	—	38	2
Barcelona B	2008–09	Segunda División B	29	2	—	—	—	—	29	2
Barcelona B	Total		67	4	—	—	—	—	67	4
Barcelona	2008–09	La Liga	1	0	1	0	—	—	2	0
Cádiz	2009–10	Segunda División	32	2	0	0	—	—	32	2
Gimnàstic	2010–11	Segunda División	4	0	1	0	—	—	5	0
Ponferradina (loan)	2010–11	Segunda División	17	0	0	0	—	—	17	0
Alcorcón	2011–12	Segunda División	30	1	5	1	1 (Note: Appearances in La Liga play-offs)	0	36	2
Alcorcón	2012–13	Segunda División	35	1	2	0	2	0	39	1
Alcorcón	Total		65	2	7	1	3	0	75	3
Espanyol	2013–14	La Liga	21	0	6	0	—	—	27	0
Espanyol	2014–15	La Liga	22	1	5	0	—	—	27	1
Espanyol	2015–16	La Liga	20	1	2	0	—	—	22	1
Espanyol	Total		63	2	13	0	—	—	76	2
UNAM	2016–17	Liga MX	35	4	0	0	4 (Note: Appearances in CONCACAF Champions League)	0	39	4
UNAM	2017–18	Liga MX	32	2	6	1	—	—	38	3
UNAM	Total		67	6	6	1	4	0	77	7
BUAP (loan)	2018–19	Liga MX	34	0	0	0	—	—	34	0
Veracruz (loan)	2019–20	Liga MX	13	0	7	0	—	—	20	0
AEK Larnaca	2019–20	Cypriot First Division	5	0	2	0	—	—	7	0
AEK Larnaca	2020–21	Cypriot First Division	9	2	0	0	—	—	9	2
AEK Larnaca	2021–22	Cypriot First Division	14	1	1	0	—	—	15	1
AEK Larnaca	Total		28	3	3	0	—	—	31	3
Ethnikos Achna	2021–22	Cypriot First Division	12	1	6	0	—	—	18	1
Akritas Chlorakas	2022–23	Cypriot First Division	38	2	1	2	—	—	39	4
Career total			515	25	49	5	7	0	571	30

== Honours ==
Barcelona

- La Liga: 2008–09
- Copa del Rey: 2008–09
