= Constantino Errazquin =

Spanish footballer (1920–1992)

Personal information
- Full name: Constantino Santiago Errazquin
- Date of birth: 24 August 1920
- Place of birth: Sestao, Spain
- Date of death: 13 December 1992 (aged 72)
- Place of death: Spain
- Position: Defender

Senior career*
Years	Team	Apps	(Gls)
1939–1941	Sestao SC		
1941–1943	Atlético Tetuán		
1943–1954	UD Melilla		

Managerial career
- 1951–1952: UD Melilla (8)
- 1954–1964: UD Melilla
- 1969–1970: CD Menorca
- 1975: Granada CF
- 1976–1977: Granada CF (3)
- 1978: Granada CF (10)
- * Club domestic league appearances and goals

Constantino Santiago Errazquin (24 August 1920 – 13 December 1992) was a Spanish footballer who played as a defender for UD Melilla in the 1940s and 1950s. After his retirement, he became a manager, taking charge of the likes of Granada CF.

== Biography ==
Born in Sestao, Biscay, Errazquin began his football career in 1939, shortly after the end of the Spanish Civil War, with his hometown club Sestao SC, then in the Segunda División. After a brief stint at Atlético Tetuán (1941–43), he joined UD Melilla, with whom he played for the rest of his career. After several failed attempts, UD Melilla finally achieved promotion to the Second Division in 1950, staying there for four years, until 1954, the same year in which he retired, aged 34.

In the 1951–52 season, Errazquin briefly became a player-coach, serving as the club's coach for eight matches amidst the transition from Picolín to Francisco Gómez Vicente. When UD Melilla folded in 1956 due to economic difficulties, Errazquin helped establish its successor, Melilla CF, in September 1956, which had a squad made up partly of players from the then defunct UD Melilla and CD Tesorillo, in order to be able to compete in the Tercera División for the 1956–57 season. Errazquin became the club's first-ever coach, and later that year, he allowed the 14-year-old José Luis Hernández to play with the starting team in the training matches at the Álvarez Claro Stadium after Hernández's father, who had been one of his former teammates in the Second Division, asked him to. Two years later, in 1958, Errazquin decided to change Añil's positions from the wing to a centre-back, and this tactical move paid off as Añil became the backbone of the Melilla team that achieved promotion to the Second Division in 1962, after beating Albacete Balompié in the play-offs at the Vallecas Stadium in Madrid.

In the 1970s, Errazquin served as the coach of Granada CF's reserve team, then known as Recreativo de Granada, and on 5 January 1975, he led them to a 1–0 win over CD Eldense in the 17th round of Group 4 of the Third Division. Between 1974 and 1978, he was called to serve as the interim manager of Granada three times, thus becoming the coach who had served the most interim mandates in Granda's history, alongside Manolo Ibáñez. Of the 27 times that Granada's coaches were required, only on three occasions was it to specifically lead the team in the domestic cup, including Ibáñez and Errazquin in the 1969–70 and 1974–75 seasons, as well as Lalo in 2000–01. In his third and final interim mandate, he replaced former Brazilian international Vavá on 24 May 1978.
