= Francisco Flores (footballer, born 1994) =

Mexican footballer

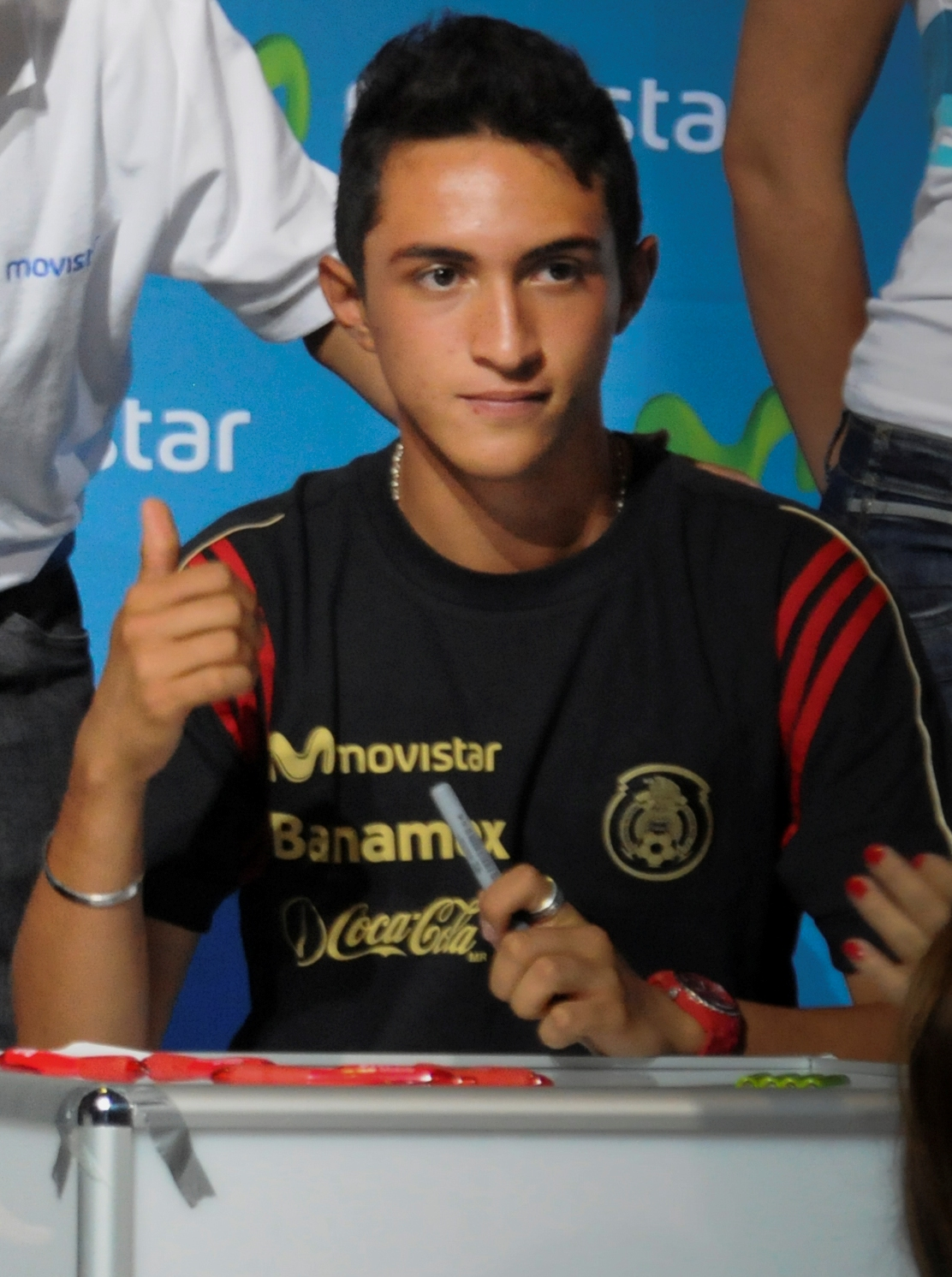
- Flores in 2010

Personal information
- Full name: Francisco Javier Flores Ibarra
- Date of birth: 17 January 1994 (age 32)
- Place of birth: Mexico City, Mexico
- Height: 1.76 m (5 ft 9 in)
- Position: Right-back

Team information
- Current team: Atlante U-19 (women) (Manager)

Youth career
- 2010–2012: Cruz Azul

Senior career*
Years	Team	Apps	(Gls)
2012–2013	Cruz Azul	7	(0)
2014	Guadalajara	0	(0)
2015–2016	→ Pachuca (loan)	0	(0)
2016–2017	→ Deportivo Tepic (loan)	13	(0)
2017–2020	Atlante	18	(0)
2018	→ Tlaxcala (loan)	7	(0)
2019	→ Pioneros de Cancún (loan)	15	(4)
2019	→ Veracruz (loan)	0	(0)
2020	Atlético Capitalino	0	(0)

International career
2011	Mexico U17	8	(0)
2012–2013	Mexico U20	11	(1)
2021	Mexico (futsal)	0	(0)

Managerial career
- 2023–2024: Cordobés (Assistant)
- 2024–2026: Cordobés
- 2026–: Atlante U-19 (women)
Medal record
Representing Mexico
First place	FIFA U-17 World Cup	2011 Mexico
First place	CONCACAF U-20 Championship	2013 Mexico
- * Club domestic league appearances and goals

Francisco Javier Flores Ibarra (born 17 January 1994) is a Mexican professional football coach and a former player who was used mainly as a right-back.

== Career ==
=== Cruz Azul ===
Flores began his football career with Cruz Azul. after his participation in the 2011 FIFA U-17 World Cup coach Enrique Meza saw potential in Flores to play him in the first team. Flores played two games with Cruz Azul during the 2012 Copa Libertadores

Flores made his professional debut for Cruz Azul March 31, 2012 in a home game vs San Luis in a 3–1 win. He came in as a substitute for Gerardo Flores in the 84' minute of the game.

On 8 July 2015, Flores joined Pachuca.

== International ==
=== Mexico U-17 ===
In 2011, Flores was chosen by coach Raúl Gutiérrez to be part of the Mexican squad that would host the 2011 FIFA U-17 World Cup. He played every single game in the tournament as a first choice right-back.

=== Mexico U-20 ===
In 2012, Flores was selected to represent Mexico at the 2012 Milk Cup held in Northern Ireland. Mexico made it to the final against Denmark and won 3–0.

In 2013, Flores was selected again by coach Sergio Almaguer to be part of the Mexican squad participating in the 2013 CONCACAF U-20 Championship held in Puebla, Mexico. He played every single match in the tournament and scored a goal versus Jamaica in the tournament.

Flores was a squad member at the 2013 Toulon Tournament and played three out of four matches, in the tournament they were placed sixth out of ten.

Flores participated in the 2013 FIFA U-20 World Cup.

== Career statistics ==
As of 24 January 2024

Appearances and goals by club, season and competition
Club	Season	League			Copa MX		Continental		Total	
Club	Season	Division	Apps	Goals	Apps	Goals	Apps	Goals	Apps	Goals
Cruz Azul	2011–12	Liga MX	1	0	0	0	2 (Note: Appearances in Copa Libertadores)	0	3	0
Cruz Azul	2012–13	Liga MX	1	0	2	0	—		3	0
Cruz Azul	2013–14	Liga MX	0	0	0	0	1 (Note: Appearance in CONCACAF Champions League)	0	1	0
Cruz Azul	Total		2	0	2	0	3	0	7	0
Guadalajara	2013–14	Liga MX	0	0	1	0	—		1	0
Deportivo Tepic (loan)	2016–17	Ascenso MX	11	0	4	0	—		15	0
Atlante	2017–18	Ascenso MX	18	0	5	0	—		23	0
Veracruz	2019–20	Liga MX	0	0	3	0	—		3	0
Career total			31	0	15	0	3	0	49	0

=== U-17 International appearances ===
U-17 International appearances
#	Date	Venue	Opponent	Result	Competition
1.	27 March 2011	Estadio Hidalgo, Pachuca, Mexico	Japan	1–0	Friendly
2.	3 April 2011	Estadio Azteca, Mexico City, Mexico	Japan	0–0	Friendly
3.	18 June 2011	Estadio Morelos, Morelia, Mexico	North Korea	3–1	2011 FIFA U-17 World Cup
4.	21 June 2011	Estadio Morelos, Morelia, Mexico	Congo	2–1	2011 FIFA U-17 World Cup
5.	24 June 2011	Estadio Universitario, Monterrey, Mexico	Netherlands	3–2	2011 FIFA U-17 World Cup
6.	30 June 2011	Estadio Hidalgo, Pachuca, Mexico	Panama	2–0	2011 FIFA U-17 World Cup
7.	4 July 2011	Estadio Hidalgo, Pachuca, Mexico	France	2–1	2011 FIFA U-17 World Cup
8.	7 July 2011	Estadio Corona, Torreón, Mexico	Germany	3–2	2011 FIFA U-17 World Cup
9.	10 July 2011	Estadio Azteca, Mexico City, Mexico	Uruguay	2–0	2011 FIFA U-17 World Cup

=== U-20 International appearances ===
U-20 International appearances
#	Date	Venue	Opponent	Result	Competition
1.	21 July 2012	Riada Stadium, Ballymoney, Northern Ireland	Turkey	5–0	2012 Milk Cup
2.	23 July 2012	The Showgrounds, Coleraine, Northern Ireland	Northern Ireland	0–0	2012 Milk Cup
3.	26 July 2012	Ballymena Showgrounds, Ballymena, Northern Ireland	Denmark	3–0	2012 Milk Cup
4.	19 February 2013	Estadio Cuauhtémoc, Puebla, Mexico	Curaçao	3–0	2013 CONCACAF U-20 Championship
5.	23 February 2013	Estadio Cuauhtémoc, Puebla, Mexico	El Salvador	3–0	2013 CONCACAF U-20 Championship
6.	27 February 2013	Estadio Cuauhtémoc, Puebla, Mexico	Jamaica	4–0	2013 CONCACAF U-20 Championship
7.	1 May 2013	Estadio Cuauhtémoc, Puebla, Mexico	El Salvador	2–0	2013 CONCACAF U-20 Championship
8.	3 May 2013	Estadio Cuauhtémoc, Puebla, Mexico	United States	3–1	2013 CONCACAF U-20 Championship
9.	May 29, 2013	Stade Perruc, Hyères, France	Nigeria	2–0	2013 Toulon Tournament
10.	June 4, 2013	Stade Louis Hon, Saint-Raphaël, France	Portugal	3–3	2013 Toulon Tournament
11.	June 6, 2013	Stade Léo Lagrange, Besançon, France	Belgium	1–1	2013 Toulon Tournament

=== U-20 International Goals ===
No.	Date	Venue	Opponent	Score	Result	Competition	Ref.
1.	February 27, 2013	Estadio Cuauhtémoc, Puebla, Mexico	Jamaica	4–0	2–0	2013 CONCACAF U-20 Championship	

== Honours ==
Cruz Azul

- Copa MX: Clausura 2013

Pachuca

- Liga MX: Clausura 2016

Mexico U17

- FIFA U-17 World Cup: 2011

Mexico U20

- Milk Cup: 2012
- CONCACAF U-20 Championship: 2013
