= 2012 Northern Ireland Youth Soccer Tournament =

Tournament details
- Host country: Northern Ireland
- Dates: 21–26 July 2012

The 2012 Northern Ireland Milk Cup is the 30th edition of the international football tournament which takes place annually in the north coast of Northern Ireland, and attracts competitors from across the globe. There are three sections to the tournament, the Elite Section (U19), the Premier Section (U17) and the Junior Section (U15).

== Elite section ==
=== Group stage ===
Team	Pld	W	D	L	GF	GA	GD	Pts
Denmark	2	2	0	0	3	1	+2	6
Mexico	2	1	1	0	5	0	+5	4
Chile	2	1	0	1	6	5	+1	3
United States	2	1	0	1	1	1	0	3
Northern Ireland	2	0	1	1	3	5	−2	1
Turkey	2	0	0	2	0	6	−6	0

21 July 2012
19:00

Northern Ireland	3–5	Chile

Showgrounds, Ballymena
21 July 2012
19:00

Denmark	1–0	United States

Scroggy Road, Limavady
21 July 2012
19:00

Turkey	0–5	Mexico

Riada Stadium, Ballymoney

23 July 2012
20:00

United States	1–0	Turkey

Showgrounds, Ballymena
23 July 2012
20:00

Mexico	0–0	Northern Ireland

Showgrounds, Coleraine
23 July 2012
20:00

Chile	1–2	Denmark

Riada Stadium, Ballymoney

=== Fifth-place playoff ===
26 July 2012
11:00

Northern Ireland	1–0	Turkey

Riada Stadium, Ballymoney

=== Third-place playoff ===
26 July 2012
13:00

Chile	4–3	United States

Riada Stadium, Ballymoney

=== Final ===
26 July 2012
18:10

Denmark	0–3	Mexico

Showgrounds, Ballymena

== Premier section ==
=== Group stage ===
Team	Pld	W	D	L	GF	GA	GD	Pts	Note
(Brazil) Desportivo Brasil	3	3	0	0	16	3	+13	9	Qualified for Milk Cup semi-final
(England) Newcastle United	3	3	0	0	13	1	+12	9	Qualified for Milk Cup semi-final
(Republic of Ireland) Cherry Orchard	3	3	0	0	6	1	+5	9	Qualified for Milk Cup semi-final
(England) Bolton Wanderers	3	2	1	0	10	3	+7	7	Qualified for Milk Cup semi-final
(England) Manchester United	3	2	0	1	10	3	+7	6	Qualified for Globe semi-final
(United States) South Coast Strikers	3	2	0	1	10	4	+6	6	Qualified for Globe semi-final
(Northern Ireland) County Tyrone	3	2	0	1	6	5	+1	6	Qualified for Globe semi-final
(Senegal) Etoile Lusitana	3	1	2	0	5	4	+1	5	Qualified for Globe semi-final
(Northern Ireland) County Down	3	1	1	1	5	6	−1	4	Qualified for Vase semi-final
(England) Tottenham Hotspur	3	1	1	1	6	8	−2	4	Qualified for Vase semi-final
(Northern Ireland) County Londonderry	3	1	1	1	2	7	−5	4	Qualified for Vase semi-final
(Russia) CSKA Moscow	3	1	0	2	8	5	+3	3	Qualified for Vase semi-final
(Mexico) Pachuca	3	1	0	2	2	9	−7	3	Qualified for Bowl semi-final
(Norway) Revo Express	3	1	0	2	3	11	−8	3	Qualified for Bowl semi-final
(Northern Ireland) County Antrim	3	0	1	2	1	3	−2	1	Qualified for Bowl semi-final
(Japan) Ichifuna	3	0	1	2	3	7	−4	1	Qualified for Bowl semi-final
(Northern Ireland) County Armagh	3	0	1	2	4	9	−5	1	Qualified for Plate semi-final
(Northern Ireland) County Fermanagh	3	0	1	2	2	7	−5	1	Qualified for Plate semi-final
(Portugal) Benfica	3	0	1	2	1	9	−8	1	Qualified for Plate semi-final
(New Zealand) Otago United	3	0	1	2	1	9	−8	1	Qualified for Plate semi-final

21 July 2012
15:30

Revo Express (Norway)	2–0	(Mexico) Pachuca

The Warren, Portstewart
21 July 2012
17:00

County Down (Northern Ireland)	1–1	(Senegal) Etoile Lusitana

Comber Rec., Comber
21 July 2012
17:00

Benfica (Portugal)	0–0	(Northern Ireland) County Antrim

Greenisland F.C.
21 July 2012
17:00

County Armagh (Northern Ireland)	1–1	(England) Tottenham Hotspur

Shamrock Park, Portadown
21 July 2012
17:00

County Tyrone (Northern Ireland)	2–0	(England) Manchester United
Glackin 34'; McShane 60'	Report

Darragh Park, Castlederg
21 July 2012
17:00

County Fermanagh (Northern Ireland)	0–4	(England) Newcastle United

Ferney Park, Ballinmallard
21 July 2012
17:00

Cherry Orchard (Republic of Ireland)	2–0	(United States) South Coast Strikers

Castlerock
21 July 2012
17:30

Otago United (New Zealand)	0–4	(England) Bolton Wanderers

Riada Stadium, Ballymoney
21 July 2012
17:30

Desportivo Brasil (Brazil)	5–2	(Japan) Ichifuna

Seahaven, Portstewart
21 July 2012
19:00

County Londonderry (Northern Ireland)	0–6	(Russia) CSKA Moscow

Showgrounds, Coleraine

23 July 2012
13:30

County Fermanagh (Northern Ireland)	1–1	(New Zealand) Otago United

Castlerock
23 July 2012
15:30

Bolton Wanderers (England)	4–1	(Northern Ireland) County Down

Showgrounds, Coleraine
23 July 2012
17:00

County Antrim (Northern Ireland)	0–1	(Republic of Ireland) Cherry Orchard

Parker Avenue, Portrush
23 July 2012
17:00

County Tyrone (Northern Ireland)	3–2	(Northern Ireland) County Armagh

Broughshane
23 July 2012
17:00

Ichifuna (Japan)	0–0	(Northern Ireland) County Londonderry

Scroggy Road, Limavady
23 July 2012
17:00

CSKA Moscow (Russia)	1–2	(Senegal) Etoile Lusitana

Castlerock
23 July 2012
17:00

Desportivo Brasil (Brazil)	6–0	(Portugal) Benfica

Rugby Avenue Stadium, Coleraine
23 July 2012
18:00

Manchester United (England)	8–0	(Norway) Revo Express
Wilson 17', 31'; Byrne 35'; Harrop 37', 39', 54', 68'; Fletcher 63'

Riada Stadium, Ballymoney
23 July 2012
18:00

Newcastle United (England)	6–0	(Mexico) Pachuca

Showgrounds, Ballymena
23 July 2012
19:00

Tottenham Hotspur (England)	1–7	(United States) South Coast Strikers

Scroggy Road, Limavady

24 July 2012
15:30

County Londonderry (Northern Ireland)	2–1	(Northern Ireland) County Fermanagh

Riada Stadium, Ballymoney
24 July 2012
15:30

County Armagh (Norway)	1–5	(Brazil) Desportivo Brasil

The Warren, Portstewart
24 July 2012
17:00

South Coast Strikers (United States)	3–1	(Northern Ireland) County Tyrone

Parker Avenue, Portrush
24 July 2012
17:00

County Down (Portugal)	3–1	(Norway) Revo Express

Rugby Avenue Stadium, Coleraine
24 July 2012
17:00

Cherry Orchard (Republic of Ireland)	3–1	(Portugal) Benfica

Broughshane
24 July 2012
19:00

Pachuca (Mexico)	2–1	(Northern Ireland) County Antrim

Seahaven, Portstewart
24 July 2012
19:00

Tottenham Hotspur (England)	4–0	(New Zealand) Otago United

Showgrounds, Coleraine
24 July 2012
19:00

Manchester United (England)	2–1	(Japan) Ichifuna
Pearson 3'; Wilson 61'		Ishikawa 51'

Showgrounds, Ballymena
24 July 2012
19:00

Newcastle United (England)	3–1	(Russia) CSKA Moscow

Riada Stadium, Ballymoney
24 July 2012
19:00

Etoile Lusitana (Senegal)	2–2	(England) Bolton Wanderers

Scroggy Road, Limavady

=== Knock-out stage ===
==== Plate ====
===== Semi-finals =====
25 July 2012
13:30

Benfica (Portugal)	1–0	(Northern Ireland) County Fermanagh

Parker Avenue, Portrush

25 July 2012
15:30

County Armagh (Northern Ireland)	2–1	(New Zealand) Otago United

Showgrounds, Ballymena

===== Third-place play-off =====
26 July 2012
13:30

Otago United (New Zealand)	0–2	(Northern Ireland) County Fermanagh

Riada Stadium, Ballymoney

===== Final =====
26 July 2012
13:30

County Armagh (Northern Ireland)	1–1	(Portugal) Benfica
Penalties
	3–4

Parker Avenue, Portrush

==== Bowl ====
===== Semi-finals =====
25 July 2012
15:30

Revo Express (Norway)	2–3	(Mexico) Pachuca

The Warren, Portstewart

25 July 2012
17:00

Ichifuna (Japan)	0–3	(Northern Ireland) County Antrim

Riada Stadium, Ballymoney

===== Third-place play-off =====
26 July 2012
13:30

Revo Express (Norway)	2–1	(Japan) Ichifuna

Showgrounds, Ballymena

===== Final =====
26 July 2012
13:30

Pachuca (Mexico)	1–2	(Northern Ireland) County Antrim

Scroggy Road, Limavady

==== Vase ====
===== Semi-finals =====
25 July 2012
17:00

Tottenham Hotspur (England)	1–2	(Russia) CSKA Moscow

Castlerock

25 July 2012
17:00

County Down (Northern Ireland)	3–1	(Northern Ireland) County Londonderry

Parker Avenue, Portrush

===== Third-place play-off =====
26 July 2012
13:30

Tottenham Hotspur (England)	2–1	(Northern Ireland) County Londonderry

Broughshane

===== Final =====
26 July 2012
13:30

CSKA Moscow (Russia)	3–3	(Northern Ireland) County Down
Penalties
	2–4

Rugby Avenue Stadium, Coleraine

==== Globe ====
===== Semi-finals =====
25 July 2012
19:00

Etoile Lusitana (Senegal)	2–0	(Northern Ireland) County Tyrone

Rugby Avenue Stadium, Coleraine

25 July 2012
19:00

South Coast Strikers (United States)	1–1	(England) Manchester United
unknown		Byrne 29'
Penalties
unknown (penalty scored) unknown (penalty scored) unknown (penalty scored); Kotselas (penalty scored)	4–3	(penalty scored) Weir; (penalty scored) Rothwell; (penalty scored) Wilson; (penalty missed) Pereira; (penalty missed) Harrop

Broughshane

===== Third-place play-off =====
26 July 2012
13:30

County Tyrone (Northern Ireland)	2–2	(England) Manchester United
Patterson unknown		Byrne; Pereira
Penalties
unknown (penalty scored) unknown (penalty missed) unknown (penalty scored) unknown (penalty missed)	2–4	(penalty scored) Weir; (penalty missed) Grimshaw; (penalty scored) Wilson; (penalty scored) Rothwell; (penalty scored) Pereira

Castlerock

===== Final =====
26 July 2012
13:30

Etoile Lusitana (Senegal)	2–0	(United States) South Coast Strikers

Showgrounds, Coleraine

==== Milk Cup ====
===== Semi-finals =====
25 July 2012
19:30

Cherry Orchard (Republic of Ireland)	0–3	(Brazil) Desportivo Brasil

Seahaven, Portstewart

25 July 2012
19:30

Bolton Wanderers (England)	0–2	(England) Newcastle United

Riada Stadium, Ballymoney

===== Third-place play-off =====
26 July 2012
13:30

Cherry Orchard (Republic of Ireland)	1–3	(England) Bolton Wanderers

Seahaven, Portstewart

===== Final =====
26 July 2012
20:20

Desportivo Brasil (Brazil)	3–0	(England) Newcastle United

Showgrounds, Ballymena
