= William Palacios (footballer, born 1994) =

Colombian footballer

Personal information
- Full name: William Enrique Palacios González
- Date of birth: 29 July 1994 (age 32)
- Place of birth: Bahía Solano, Chocó, Colombia
- Height: 1.74 m (5 ft 9 in)
- Position: Midfielder

Team information
- Current team: Deportivo Achuapa
- Number: 9

Youth career
- 2011–2013: Once Caldas

Senior career*
Years	Team	Apps	(Gls)
2013–2014	Once Caldas	8	(0)
2014–2015	Irapuato	2	(0)
2015	Jaguares Córdoba	17	(2)
2015–2019	Tigres UANL	0	(0)
2016	→ Santa Fe (loan)	11	(1)
2016	→ Atlético Huila (loan)	3	(0)
2016	→ Universidad San Martín (loan)	10	(1)
2017–2018	→ Comerciantes Unidos (loan)	13	(4)
2017	→ Lobos BUAP (loan)	1	(0)
2017–2018	→ Aldosivi (loan)	6	(0)
2018	→ Sol de América (loan)	9	(1)
2018	→ Celaya (loan)	3	(0)
2019	→ Independiente Medellín (loan)	2	(0)
2020	Manaus	0	(0)
2020–	Deportivo Achuapa	8	(1)
- * Club domestic league appearances and goals as of 17:05, 25 October 2020 (UTC)

William Enrique Palacios González (born 29 July 1994) is a Colombian footballer who last played as midfielder for Guatemalan club Deportivo Achuapa.

== Career ==
=== Club career ===
In the early hours of 6 August 2017, along with Julián Quiñones, Palacios was involved in a bar fight in Puebla. The matter was under investigation which resulted in Palacios being waived for the remainder of his loan tenure at Lobos. As of 8 August, Lobos BUAP officially announced that Palacios would be released.

In January 2020, Palacios moved to Brazilian club Manaus Futebol Clube.
