= Esneyder Mena =

Colombian footballer (born 1997)

Personal information
- Full name: Esneyder Mena Perea
- Date of birth: 3 November 1997 (age 29)
- Place of birth: Unguía, Colombia
- Height: 1.78 m (5 ft 10 in)
- Positions: Right-back; right midfielder

Team information
- Current team: Independiente Medellín
- Number: 26

Senior career*
Years	Team	Apps	(Gls)
2016–2018	UANL Premier	31	(6)
2017–2020	UANL	0	(0)
2017	→ Jaguares de Córdoba (loan)	1	(0)
2018	→ Patriotas Boyacá (loan)	6	(0)
2019–2020	→ Correcaminos UAT (loan)	38	(3)
2020–2021	Deportivo Pasto	49	(0)
2022–2025	América de Cali	111	(3)
2024	→ Atlético Bucaramanga (loan)	16	(0)
2025–	Independiente Medellín	24	(0)
- * Club domestic league appearances and goals as of 11 December 2025

Esneyder Mena Perea (born 3 November 1997) is a Colombian footballer who currently plays as a right-back for Independiente Medellín. After a switch of position from right midfield, his technical ability, brilliant crossing and long-range passing led to him being dubbed ‘the Trent Alexander-Arnold of Colombian football’.

== Career statistics ==
=== Club ===
As of 15 April 2019.

Club	Season	League			Cup		Continental		Other		Total	
Club	Season	Division	Apps	Goals	Apps	Goals	Apps	Goals	Apps	Goals	Apps	Goals
UANL Premier	2016–17	Segunda Division	19	3	–		–		0	0	19	3
UANL Premier	2017–18	Liga Premier – Serie A	12	3	–		–		0	0	12	3
UANL Premier	Total		31	6	0	0	0	0	0	0	31	6
UANL	2016–17	Liga MX	0	0	0	0	0	0	0	0	0	0
UANL	2017–18	Liga MX	0	0	0	0	0	0	0	0	0	0
UANL	2018–19	Liga MX	0	0	0	0	0	0	0	0	0	0
UANL	Total		0	0	0	0	0	0	0	0	0	0
Jaguares de Córdoba (loan)	2017	Categoría Primera A	5	0	5 (Note: Appearances in the Copa Colombia)	1	–		0	0	10	1
Patriotas Boyacá (loan)	2018	Categoría Primera A	8	0	0	0	–		0	0	8	0
Atlante	2018–19	Ascenso MX	11	0	3 (Note: Appearances in the Copa MX)	1	–		0	0	14	1
Career total			55	0	8	2	0	0	0	0	63	2
