= Juan Roldán (footballer) =

Mexican footballer (born 1986)

Personal information
- Full name: Juan Ricardo Roldán Trujillo
- Date of birth: 31 March 1986 (age 40)
- Place of birth: Lagos de Moreno, Jalisco, Mexico
- Height: 1.80 m (5 ft 11 in)
- Position: Goalkeeper

Team information
- Current team: Celaya
- Number: 28

Senior career*
Years	Team	Apps	(Gls)
2008–2009	Petroleros Salamanca	13	(0)
2009–2010	CF La Piedad	10	(0)
2010–2011	Club León	0	(0)
2011–2014	Club Celaya	0	(0)
2014–2016	Club Atlético Zacatepec (on loan)	50	(0)
2016–	Celaya F.C.	70	(0)
- * Club domestic league appearances and goals as of 14 September 2018

Juan Ricardo Roldán Trujillo (born 31 March 1986) is a Mexican football goalkeeper. He currently plays for Celaya.

== Career ==
Roldán made his professional debut for Petroleros de Salamanca on 16 August 2008, in a match against Pegaso Real Colima, which the latter won (2-0).

For the Apertura 2009, when Salamanca was dissolved and relocated to La Piedad, Roldán left as well.

Roldán has managed to secure his position as the starting goalkeeper for the Reboceros.
