= Julián Cardozo =

Argentine footballer

Personal information
- Full name: Julián Gabriel Cardozo
- Date of birth: 2 January 1991 (age 35)
- Place of birth: Santa Fe, Argentina
- Height: 1.75 m (5 ft 9 in)
- Position: Midfielder

Youth career
- Arsenal de Sarandí

Senior career*
| Years | Team | Apps | (Gls) |
| 2011–2015 | Arsenal de Sarandí | 22 | (0) |
| 2015 | Aurora | 0 | (0) |
| 2016–2017 | Mineros de Zacatecas | 57 | (5) |
| 2017–2018 | Murciélagos | 27 | (1) |
| 2019–2020 | Zacatepec | 34 | (5) |
| 2020 | Los Cabos | | |
| 2021 | Sport Boys | 3 | (0) |
| 2022 | Achuapa | 10 | (0) |
- * Club domestic league appearances and goals as of 21:19, 27 November 2022 (UTC)

Julián Gabriel Cardozo (born January 2, 1991) is an Argentine professional footballer who plays as a midfielder.
