= Afolabi Julius =

Nigerian footballer

Afolabi Oladimeji Julius (born 27 November 1994) is a Nigerian footballer who plays as a forward for Cafetaleros de Tapachula.
