= Alejandro Arana =

Mexican footballer (born 1997)

Personal information
- Full name: Alejandro Arana Schlettwein
- Date of birth: 5 August 1997 (age 29)
- Place of birth: Álvaro Obregón, Mexico City, Mexico
- Height: 1.80 m (5 ft 11 in)
- Position: Goalkeeper

Youth career
- 2014–2015: Querétaro

Senior career*
Years	Team	Apps	(Gls)
2015–2017	Coras	9	(0)
2017	UNAM Premier	0	(0)
2018	Irapuato	9	(0)
2018	Oaxaca	0	(0)
2019–2020	Zacatepec	0	(0)
2020	→ Monagas (loan)	6	(0)
2020–2021	Atlético Morelia	23	(0)
2021	Tudelano	0	(0)
2022–2024	Querétaro	0	(0)
2024	Naval Reinosa	10	(0)
2025	Santiago Morning	5	(0)
- * Club domestic league appearances and goals as of 21 March 2026

Alejandro Arana Schlettwein (born 5 August 1997) is a Mexican professional footballer who plays as a goalkeeper.

== Career ==
In February 2025, Arana moved to Chile and signed with Santiago Morning in the Primera B.
