= Armando Nieves =

Colombian footballer (born 1989)

Personal information
- Full name: Armando José Nieves Vargas
- Date of birth: 14 November 1989 (age 36)
- Place of birth: Barranquilla, Colombia
- Height: 1.90 m (6 ft 3 in)
- Position: Defender

Youth career
- Barranquilla

Senior career*
Years	Team	Apps	(Gls)
2009–2010	Barranquilla		
2011–2013	Junior	19	(1)
2012	→ Veracruz (loan)	3	(0)
2013	→ Barranquilla (loan)	9	(0)
2014	América de Cali	5	(0)
2014–2015	Piast Gliwice	0	(0)
2014–2015	Piast Gliwice II	29	(1)
2015–2017	Universidad Guadalajara	31	(0)
2017–2018	Potros UAEM	9	(0)
2019	Liria	4	(0)
- * Club domestic league appearances and goals

Armando José Nieves Vargas (born 14 November 1989) is a Colombian former professional footballer who played as a defender.

== Honours ==
Junior

- Categoría Primera A: 2011 Finalización
