= Tulyehualco =

Mexican football club

Tehuacan A.C.
- Full name: Liga Futbol de Tehuacan A.C.
- Nickname: Reales
- Founded: 1945
- Ground: Centro Escolar Niños Héroes de Chaputepe, Puebla city, Puebla
- Capacity: 1,000
- Chairman: Jose Marcos Gonzales
- Manager: Ángeles Tláhuac
- League: Tercera División de México
Home colours	Away colours

Tulyehualco is a Mexican football club that plays in the Tercera División de México. The club is based in Puebla city, Puebla and plays its home games at the Centro Escolar Niños Héroes de Chaputepe, which adjoins the Estadio Cuauhtémoc.

== See also ==
- Football in Mexico
