= Luis Martell =

Mexican volleyball player (born 1945)

Personal information
- Born: 1 June 1945 (age 79); Mexico City, Mexico

Sport
- Sport: Volleyball

Luis Martell (born 1 June 1945) is a Mexican volleyball player. He competed in the men's tournament at the 1968 Summer Olympics.
