= Rafael Ramírez (footballer) =

Mexican footballer (born 1992)

Personal information
- Full name: Rafael de Jesús Ramírez Miranda
- Date of birth: 4 November 1992 (age 33)
- Place of birth: Guadalajara, Jalisco, Mexico
- Height: 1.78 m (5 ft 10 in)
- Position: Goalkeeper

Youth career
- 2009–2012: Estudiantes Tecos

Senior career*
| Years | Team | Apps | (Gls) |
| 2012–2014 | Estudiantes Tecos | 1 | (0) |
| 2014–2018 | Zacatecas | 28 | (0) |
| 2016–2017 | → Pachuca (loan) | 0 | (0) |
| 2018 | Tecos | 14 | (0) |
| 2019–2020 | Venados | 5 | (0) |
| 2020 | Jaguares de Jalisco | 0 | (0) |
| 2021 | Metro Louisville FC | 0 | (0) |
| 2021–2022 | Venados | 45 | (0) |
| 2023 | Necaxa | 1 | (0) |
- * Club domestic league appearances and goals

Rafael de Jesús Ramírez Miranda (born 4 November 1992) is a Mexican former professional footballer who played as a goalkeeper.

== Honours ==
Pachuca

- CONCACAF Champions League: 2016–17
