= Omar Islas =

Mexican footballer (born 1996)

Personal information
- Full name: Omar Islas Hernández
- Date of birth: 13 April 1996 (age 30)
- Place of birth: Naucalpan, Mexico
- Height: 1.71 m (5 ft 7 in)
- Position: Forward

Team information
- Current team: Correcaminos
- Number: 7

Youth career
- 2014–2015: Pumas UNAM

Senior career*
Years	Team	Apps	(Gls)
2014–2022	Pumas UNAM	26	(0)
2017–2018	→ Venados (loan)	22	(0)
2019	→ Oaxaca (loan)	13	(1)
2019–2020	→ Atlante (loan)	25	(4)
2020	→ Querétaro (loan)	13	(3)
2021–2022	→ Pumas Tabasco (loan)	44	(13)
2023–2025	Atlético Morelia	62	(9)
2026	Tepatitlán	0	(0)
2026–	Correcaminos	0	(0)
- * Club domestic league appearances and goals as of 31 August 2024

Omar Islas Hernández (born 13 April 1996) is a Mexican professional footballer who plays as a forward for Liga de Expansión MX club Correcaminos.
