= Diego Chávez (footballer, born 1995) =

Mexican footballer (1995–2024)

Personal information
- Full name: Diego Chávez Collins
- Date of birth: 11 May 1995
- Place of birth: Veracruz, Veracruz, Mexico
- Date of death: 14 February 2024 (aged 28)
- Place of death: Ciudad Juárez, Chihuahua, Mexico
- Height: 1.75 m (5 ft 9 in)
- Position: Forward

Youth career
- 2011–2015: Veracruz

Senior career*
Years	Team	Apps	(Gls)
2015–2019	Veracruz	92	(17)
2016–2017	→ Juárez (loan)	17	(1)
2020	Necaxa	7	(1)
2020–2021	Salamanca	23	(5)
2021	Toluca	10	(2)
2022	Carlos A. Mannucci	29	(3)
2023–2024	Juárez	26	(2)
Total		204	(31)
- * Club domestic league appearances and goals

Diego Chávez Collins (11 May 1995 – 14 February 2024) was a Mexican professional footballer who played as a forward.

== Career ==
On 11 August 2015, Chávez made his official debut in the Liga MX with Veracruz against Club Tijuana in an away game celebrated in the Estadio Caliente. He came on as a substitute in the 75th minute and scored the third goal for the Tiburones; the game ended-up 3–1 to Veracruz.

== Death ==
Chávez died on 14 February 2024 after crashing his car into a lamppost in Ciudad Juárez. He was 28.

== See also ==
- List of Mexicans
