= Kevin Ramírez (footballer, born 1998) =

Mexican footballer

Personal information
- Full name: Kevin Enrique Ramírez Ibarra
- Date of birth: 6 January 1998 (age 28)
- Place of birth: Tepic, Mexico
- Height: 1.80 m (5 ft 11 in)
- Position: Midfielder

Youth career
- Guadalajara

Senior career*
Years	Team	Apps	(Gls)
2016–2017	Guadalajara C	12	(0)
2018	Guadalajara	0	(0)
2018	→ Zacatepec (loan)	0	(0)
2019	→ El Paso Locomotive (loan)	0	(0)
2019	Tecos	2	(0)
2020	Murciélagos	6	(0)
2020	Durango	4	(0)
2021	Colima	6	(0)
2022	Coras	3	(0)
- * Club domestic league appearances and goals as of 15:44, 25 September 2020 (UTC)

Kevin Enrique Ramírez Ibarra (born 6 January 1998) is a Mexican professional footballer who plays as a midfielder for Colima.

== Career ==
Ramírez began in the youth ranks of Guadalajara, notably featuring for the U15s and U20s. Ramírez had a trial with Premier League side Manchester City in August 2013, which led to the midfielder signing a pre-contract agreement. However, due to injuries, he didn't join Manchester City. In 2018, Ramírez was loaned to Ascenso MX team Zacatepec. He made his professional debut on 15 August 2018 in the Copa MX versus Cruz Azul, he was substituted on for the second half of a 2–0 defeat. Ramírez returned to Guadalajara in December, before departing to join El Paso Locomotive of the USL Championship.

Ramírez went back to Guadalajara on 24 May 2019, after no appearances for El Paso Locomotive; only making the substitutes bench twice for fixtures with Phoenix Rising and Austin Bold. Ramírez subsequently had two further loan spells away across the next twelve moves, initially joining Tecos before heading off to Murciélagos; both being Liga Premier clubs. After a total of eight appearances, he'd return to Guadalajara. In mid-2020, Ramírez joined fellow third tier side Durango.

== Career statistics ==
As of 4 January 2019.

Club statistics
Club	Season	League			Cup		Continental		Other		Total	
Club	Season	Division	Apps	Goals	Apps	Goals	Apps	Goals	Apps	Goals	Apps	Goals
Guadalajara C	[2016–17	Tercera División	11	0	0	0	—		0	0	11	0
Guadalajara C	2017–18	Tercera División	1	0	0	0	—		0	0	1	0
Guadalajara C	Total		12	0	0	0	—		0	0	12	0
Guadalajara	2018–19	Liga MX	0	0	0	0	—		0	0	0	0
Guadalajara	2019–20	Liga MX	0	0	0	0	—		0	0	0	0
Guadalajara	Total		0	0	0	0	—		0	0	0	0
Zacatepec (loan)	2018–19	Ascenso MX	0	0	1	0	—		0	0	1	0
El Paso Locomotive (loan)	2019	USL Championship	0	0	0	0	—		0	0	0	0
Tecos (loan)	2019–20	Liga Premier	2	0	0	0	—		0	0	2	0
Murciélagos (loan)	2019–20	Liga Premier	6	0	0	0	—		0	0	6	0
Durango	2020–21	Liga Premier	4	0	0	0	—		0	0	4	0
Colima	2020–21	Liga Premier	6	0	0	0	—		0	0	6	0
Career total			30	0	1	0	—		0	0	31	0
