= Lutman, Missouri =

Extinct hamlet in Missouri, U.S.

Coordinates: 38°36′37″N 93°05′15″W

Lutman is an extinct town in Pettis County, in the U.S. state of Missouri.

A post office called Lutman was established in 1892, and remained in operation until 1907. The town has the name of George W. Lutman, the original owner of the site.
