= Federico Illanes =

Argentine footballer

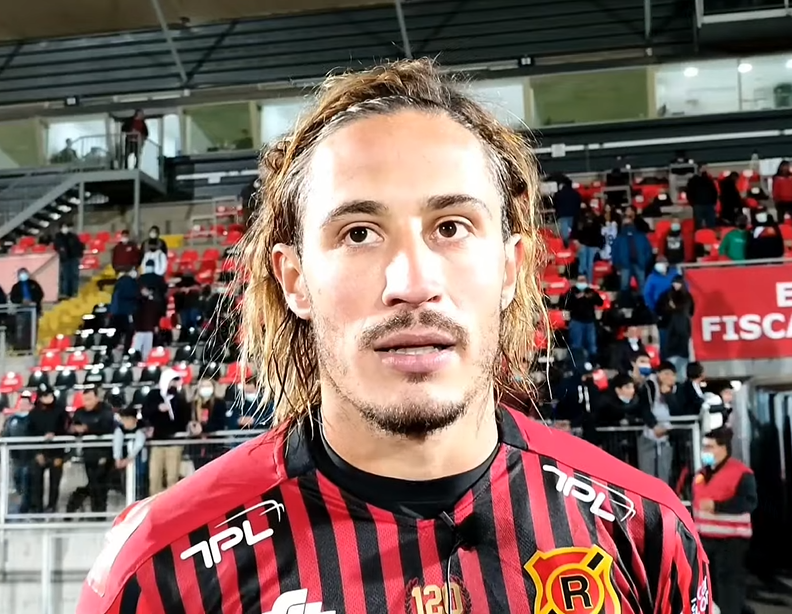
- Illanes with Rangers in 2022

Personal information
- Full name: Federico Arturo Illanes
- Date of birth: 29 June 1994 (age 32)
- Place of birth: San Martín, Mendoza, Argentina
- Height: 1.78 m (5 ft 10 in)
- Position: Defensive midfielder

Team information
- Current team: Alianza Atlético
- Number: 8

Youth career
- Lanús
- Godoy Cruz

Senior career*
Years	Team	Apps	(Gls)
2015	Godoy Cruz	0	(0)
2016–2017	San Martín Mendoza	36	(0)
2017	→ Independiente Neuquén (loan)	10	(0)
2018–2019	Juventud Unida SL	34	(1)
2019	Veracruz	2	(0)
2020	Cafetaleros de Chiapas	3	(0)
2020	Cancún	0	(0)
2020–2021	Deportivo Maipú	10	(0)
2021	→ Rangers (loan)	20	(0)
2022–2024	Rangers	47	(0)
2024	→ Alianza Atlético (loan)	31	(0)
2025–	Alianza Atlético	26	(0)
- * Club domestic league appearances and goals as of 30 December 2025

Federico Arturo Illanes (born 29 June 1994) is an Argentine footballer who plays as a defensive midfielder for Peruvian Primera División club Alianza Atlético.

== Club career ==
Born in San Martín, Mendoza, Argentina, Illanes is a product of both Lanús and Godoy Cruz. In 2016, he switched to San Martín de Mendoza and was loaned to Independiente de Neuquén in 2017.

In 2018–19, Illanes played for Juventud Unida Universitario from San Luis.

In the second half of 2019, he moved to Mexico and had stints with Veracruz, Cafetaleros de Chiapas and Cancún.

In 2020, Illanes returned to Argentina and signed with Deportivo Maipú, with whom he got promotion to the Primera B Nacional. In 2021, he was loaned out to Chilean club Rangers de Talca on a one-year deal with an option to buy. The next year, he renewed with Rangers for four years. In 2024, he moved to Peru and joined on loan to Alianza Atlético in the top division.
