= Marco Argüelles =

Mexican footballer (born 1989)

Personal information
- Full name: Marco Arturo Argüelles Villordo
- Date of birth: 2 March 1989 (age 37)
- Place of birth: Puebla, México
- Height: 1.71 m (5 ft 7 in)
- Position: Midfielder

Senior career*
Years	Team	Apps	(Gls)
2010–2011	La Piedad	13	(0)
2011–2012	Universidad de Guadalajara	20	(1)
2012–2014	Tecos UAG	37	(3)
2014	→ Mineros de Zacatecas (loan)	0	(0)
2015	→ Lobos BUAP (loan)	0	(0)
2015–2016	Cafetaleros	23	(1)
2016–2017	Dorados de Sinaloa	37	(1)
2017–2018	Zacatepec	34	(1)
2020	Jaguares de Jalisco	0	(0)
- * Club domestic league appearances and goals as of 23:52, 12 September 2019 (UTC)

Marco Argüelles (born March 3, 1989) is a former Mexican professional footballer.
