= Víctor Guajardo =

Mexican footballer (born 1990)

Personal information
- Full name: Víctor Manuel Guajardo Valdez
- Date of birth: 30 August 1990 (age 36)
- Place of birth: Monterrey, Nuevo León, Mexico
- Height: 1.75 m (5 ft 9 in)
- Position: Winger

Senior career*
Years	Team	Apps	(Gls)
2010–2015	Morelia	8	(0)
2011–2012	→ Toros Neza (loan)	19	(0)
2013	→ Atlético San Luis (loan)	5	(1)
2014	→ Querétaro (loan)	3	(0)
2015	→ UAT (loan)	9	(0)
2016	→ Coras (loan)	14	(1)
2016–2017	→ Zacatepec (loan)	31	(4)
2017–2018	Sonora	28	(5)
2018–2019	Venados	13	(2)
2019	Tampico Madero	11	(2)
2019–2021	Sonora	39	(3)
2021	Tepatitlán	10	(1)
2022	Pumas Tabasco	10	(0)
- * Club domestic league appearances and goals

Víctor Manuel Guajardo Valdez (Note: In this Spanish name, the first or paternal surname is Guajardo and the second or maternal family name is Valdez.) (born 30 August 1990) is a Mexican professional footballer who plays as a winger.
