= Irving Ávalos =

Mexican footballer (born 1991)

Personal information
- Full name: Irving Rolando Ávalos González
- Date of birth: 14 March 1991 (age 35)
- Place of birth: Tepic, Nayarit, Mexico
- Height: 1.72 m (5 ft 8 in)
- Position: Attacking midfielder

Senior career*
Years	Team	Apps	(Gls)
2013	Guadalajara	1	(0)
2013–2014	Tepic	26	(2)
2015–2017	Loros UdeC	48	(4)
2017–2018	Juárez	14	(1)
2019	Celaya	10	(0)
- * Club domestic league appearances and goals

Irving Rolando Ávalos González (born 14 March 1991) is a Mexican former footballer. His nickname is Pirri.

== Club career ==
Avalos came out of the Guadalajara youth system.
