= Jonathan Vega =

Mexican footballer (born 1997)

Personal information
- Full name: Jonathan Vega Gastelum
- Date of birth: 6 September 1997 (age 29)
- Place of birth: Mexicali, Baja California, Mexico
- Height: 1.81 m (5 ft 11 in)
- Position: Forward

Youth career
- 2014–2019: Tigres UANL

Senior career*
| Years | Team | Apps | (Gls) |
| 2019–2020 | Tigres UANL | 0 | (0) |
| 2019–2020 | → Sonora (loan) | 31 | (5) |
| 2020–2021 | Atlante | 21 | (1) |
| 2021–2023 | Zacatecas | 52 | (9) |
- * Club domestic league appearances and goals as of 17 April 2022

Jonathan Vega Gastelum (born 6 September 1997) is a Mexican professional footballer who plays as a forward.
