= Cristian Ortíz (footballer, born 1999) =

Mexican footballer (born 1999)

Personal information
- Full name: Cristian Alejandro Ortíz Acosta
- Date of birth: May 3, 1999 (age 27)
- Place of birth: Tijuana, Mexico
- Height: 5 ft 5 in (1.65 m)
- Positions: Left back; left winger

Youth career
- 2013–2019: Guadalajara

Senior career*
| Years | Team | Apps | (Gls) |
| 2019–2020 | Guadalajara | 2 | (0) |
| 2019 | → Zacatepec (loan) | 6 | (0) |
| 2020 | Austin Bold | 3 | (0) |
- * Club domestic league appearances and goals as of 6 October 2020

Cristian Alejandro Ortíz Acosta (born 3 May 1999) is a Mexican footballer who plays as a midfielder.

== Career ==
=== Guadalajara ===
Ortiz joined Chivas in 2013, graduating through their youth teams before going on loan Zacatepec in 2019, where he made five appearances during the Copa MX Clausura. He made his sole appearance for Chivas in 2020 in a 2–1 Copa MX defeat against Dorados de Sinaloa on 21 January 2020. He was released by the club on 21 June 2020.

=== Austin Bold ===
In August 2020, Ortíz joined USL Championship side Austin Bold. He made his debut for Austin on 22 August 2020, appearing as a 67th-minute substitute during a 3–2 win over Rio Grande Valley FC.
