= José Hernández (footballer, born 1994) =

Mexican footballer

Personal information
- Full name: José Luis Hernández Martínez
- Date of birth: 10 October 1994 (age 32)
- Place of birth: Mexico City, Mexico
- Height: 1.72 m (5 ft 8 in)
- Position: Midfielder

Team information
- Current team: Gavilanes de Matamoros
- Number: 17

Youth career
- 2012–2015: América

Senior career*
Years	Team	Apps	(Gls)
2015–2017	América	22	(0)
2015–2016	→ Sonora (loan)	10	(0)
2016	→ UAT (loan)	0	(0)
2017–2019	Necaxa	20	(0)
2019	→ Zacatepec (loan)	0	(0)
2020	Atlético Ensenada	0	(0)
2021–	Gavilanes de Matamoros	6	(1)
- * Club domestic league appearances and goals as of 15 March 2021

José Luis Hernández Martínez (Note: In this Spanish name, the first or paternal surname is Hernández and the second or maternal family name is Martínez.) (born October 10, 1994, in Tlalpan, Mexico City) is a Mexican professional footballer who plays for Gavilanes de Matamoros of Liga Premier de México.
