= Luis Lozoya =

Mexican football player (born 1993)

Personal information
- Full name: Luis Alberto Lozoya Mendoza
- Date of birth: 10 April 1993 (age 33)
- Place of birth: Zaragoza, Coahuila, Mexico
- Height: 1.68 m (5 ft 6 in)
- Position: Defender

Youth career
- 2009: Santos Laguna
- 2009–2010: Calor

Senior career*
Years	Team	Apps	(Gls)
2010–2015	Santos Laguna	4	(0)
2012	→ Águilas Reales (loan)	13	(0)
2012–2013	→ Calor (loan)	24	(5)
2016–2019	Celaya	22	(0)
2016–2018	→ Irapuato (loan)	16	(0)
2019	Veracruz	14	(0)
2020	Alebrijes de Oaxaca	2	(0)
2021	Tijuana	1	(0)
- * Club domestic league appearances and goals as of 13 August 2021

Luis Alberto Lozoya Mendoza (born April 10, 1993) is a former Mexican professional footballer who last played for the Kings League club Peluche Caligari in a 7 a side football tournament created by Miguel Layun
