= Iván Santillán =

Peruvian footballer (born 1990)

Personal information
- Full name: Iván Diego Santillán Atoche
- Date of birth: 6 May 1991 (age 35)
- Place of birth: Talara, Peru
- Height: 1.77 m (5 ft 10 in)
- Position: Left-back

Team information
- Current team: ADC Juan Pablo II College
- Number: 27

Youth career
- –2008: Coronel Bolognesi

Senior career*
Years	Team	Apps	(Gls)
2009–2011	Coronel Bolognesi	49	(7)
2012–2018	Real Garcilaso	222	(15)
2019	Veracruz	9	(1)
2020–2022	Universitario de Deportes	46	(4)
2023	Cienciano	23	(0)
2024	Club Deportivo Los Chankas	2	(0)
2024	AD Comerciantes FC	11	(0)
2025-	ADC Juan Pablo II College	15	(0)
- * Club domestic league appearances and goals

Iván Diego Santillán Atoche (born 6 May 1991) is a Peruvian professional footballer who plays as a left-back for club ADC Juan Pablo II College.

== Career ==
Santillán came from the youth ranks of Coronel Bolognesi, where he also began his senior career in 2009. He made his Torneo Descentralizado league debut in round 2 at home against Alianza Lima. Manager Roberto Mosquera put Santillán in late in the match for Javier Chumpitaz, but in the end his side lost 2–1. In his fourth match, he made his first league start, playing the entire game in a 4–1 defeat to CD Universidad San Martin. He finished his debut season in the top-flight with nine league appearances, but with his team being relegated. In 2010, Santillán played in the Second Division, with irregular performances, but had a remarkable campaign in the 2011 season.

In January 2012, Santillán joined newly promoted side Real Garcilaso, where he was given the number 27 jersey and was expected to compete with Hugo Ángeles for a spot in the starting XI. However, he was initially sent to play with the reserve team, eventually playing with the first team under manager Freddy García.

After much controversy, Santillán was sold to Tiburones Rojos de Veracruz in January 2019. In 2020, Santillán went back to Peru to play for Universitario.

== Honours ==
Universitario de Deportes

- Torneo Apertura 2020
