= Carlos Camacho (footballer) =

Mexican footballer (born 1994)

Personal information
- Full name: Carlos Eduardo Camacho Lutman
- Date of birth: 11 August 1994 (age 32)
- Place of birth: Tapachula, Chiapas, Mexico
- Height: 1.81 m (5 ft 11 in)
- Position: Midfielder

Youth career
- 2011–2015: América

Senior career*
Years	Team	Apps	(Gls)
2015	América	1	(0)
2015–2016	→ Cimarrones de Sonora (loan)	13	(0)
2017–2018	Necaxa Premier	44	(11)
2019–2020	Celaya	35	(5)
2020	Atlético Veracruz	0	(0)
2021	Cafetaleros de Chiapas	12	(2)
2021	UAT	2	(0)
2021	Matamoros	0	(0)
- * Club domestic league appearances and goals as of 6 August 2021

Carlos Eduardo Camacho Lutman (born August 11, 1994) is a Mexican professional footballer.
