= 2015–16 Ascenso MX season =

Season of a Mexican football league

Ascenso MX
- Season: 2015–16
- Champions: Apertura: FC Juárez; Clausura: Necaxa
- Promoted: Necaxa
- Relegated: No relegation
- Matches: 120
- Goals: 350 (2.92 per match)
- Top goalscorer: Apertura: Carlos Garcés (11); Clausura:
- Biggest home win: Apertura: Club Universidad de Guadalajara 7-1 UAT (August 14, 2015); Clausura: three matches 2-0 (January 9, 22 and 24, 2016)
- Biggest away win: Apertura: Tapachula 0-4 Sonora; UAT 1-5 BUAP (August 21, 2015); Clausura: Murciélagos 0-6 Coras (January 8, 2016)
- Highest scoring: Apertura: Club Universidad de Guadalajara 7-1 UAT (August 14, 2015); Clausura: Murciélagos 0-6 Coras (January 8, 2016)
- Longest winning run: Zacatecas; Atlético San Luis (3 wins)
- Longest unbeaten run: Oaxaca (4 Games); Coras (3 Games)
- Longest winless run: Venados (6 Games)
- Longest losing run: Tapachula (4 losses)
- Highest attendance: Apertura:
- Lowest attendance: Apertura:

The 2015–16 Ascenso MX season is a two-part competition: Apertura 2019 began 25 July 2015 and Clausura 2020. Ascenso MX is the second-tier football league of Mexico. All Ascenso MX teams except FC Juárez and Cimarrones de Sonora, will participate in Copa MX.

== Changes from the previous season ==
- Dorados de Sinaloa were promoted to Liga MX.
- Club Universidad de Guadalajara were relegated from Liga MX.
- Loros de la Universidad de Colima were promoted from Segunda División de México (will join in 2016–17 season).
- Altamira F.C. were moved to Tapachula, Chiapas and rebranded to Cafetaleros de Tapachula
- Irapuato F.C. were rebranded to Murciélagos F.C. and moved to Los Mochis, Sinaloa.
- Mérida F.C. now be changing logo and will be called Venados F.C. (keeping the venue in Mérida).
- Cimarrones de Sonora and FC Juárez were promoted to Ascenso MX as expansion teams.

== Stadia and locations ==
Club	City	Stadium	Capacity
Atlante	Cancún, Quintana Roo	Andrés Quintana Roo	17,289
Atlético San Luis	San Luis Potosí City, San Luis Potosí	Alfonso Lastras	25,111
BUAP	Puebla City, Puebla	Universitario BUAP	19,283
Celaya	Celaya, Guanajuato	Miguel Alemán	23,369
Coras	Tepic, Nayarit	Arena Cora	12,271
Juárez	Ciudad Juárez, Chihuahua	Olímpico Benito Juárez	19,703
Murciélagos	Los Mochis, Sinaloa	Centenario	11,134
Necaxa	Aguascalientes City, Aguascalientes	Victoria	23,851
Oaxaca	Oaxaca City, Oaxaca	Instituto Tecnológico de Oaxaca	14,598
Sonora	Hermosillo, Sonora	Héroe de Nacozari	18,747
Tapachula	Tapachula, Chiapas	Olímpico de Tapachula	11,018
UdeG	Guadalajara, Jalisco	Jalisco	55,020
UAT	Ciudad Victoria, Tamaulipas	Marte R. Gómez	10,520
Venados	Mérida, Yucatán	Carlos Iturralde	15,087
Zacatecas	Zacatecas City, Zacatecas	Francisco Villa	13,820
Zacatepec	Zacatepec, Morelos	Agustín "Coruco" Díaz	24,313

Locations of clubs for the 2015–16 Ascenso MX season

=== Personnel and kits ===
Team	Chairman	Head coach	Captain	Kit manufacturer
Atlante	Eduardo Braun Burillo	(Mexico) Eduardo Fentanes	(Mexico) Juan de la Barrera	Kappa
Atlético San Luis	Jacobo Payán Espinosa	(Argentina) Carlos Bustos	(Mexico) Othoniel Arce	Charly
BUAP	Vacant	(Argentina) Ricardo Valiño	(Mexico) Omar Tejeda	Keuka
Celaya	Marcos Achar	(Uruguay) Gustavo Díaz	(Argentina) Alfredo Moreno	Keuka
Coras	José Luis Higuera	(Argentina) Hernán Cristante	(Mexico) Jorge Kalú Gastélum	Romed
Juárez	Alejandra de la Vega	(Mexico) Sergio Orduña	(Mexico) Iván Vázquez Mellado	Umbro
Murciélagos	Miguel Favela	(Mexico) Adolfo García	(Mexico) Alfonso Rippa	Keuka
Necaxa	Ernesto Tinajero	(Mexico) Alfonso Sosa	(Mexico) Luis Padilla	Umbro
Oaxaca	Javier San Román	(Mexico) Flavio Davino	(Argentina) Diego Menghi	Lotto
Sonora	Servando Carbajal	(Mexico) Héctor Medrano	(Mexico) Raúl Rico	Kappa
Tapachula	Gabriel Orantes Constanzo	(Mexico) Gabriel Caballero	(Mexico) Ismael Valadéz	Silver Sport
UAT	Manuel Corcuera Canseco	(Mexico) José Treviño	(Mexico) Hugo Sánchez	Lotto
UdeG	José Alberto Castellanos	(Mexico) Daniel Guzmán	(Mexico) Humberto Hernández	Lotto
Venados	Rodolfo Rosas Cantillo	(Mexico) Marcelo Michel Leaño	(Mexico) Aldo Polo	Foursport
Zacatecas	Armando Martínez Patiño	(Mexico) Ricardo Rayas	(Mexico) Noé Maya	Pirma
Zacatepec	Rodolfo Davis Contreras	(Mexico) Carlos Gutiérrez	(Mexico) Rodolfo Espinoza	Silver Sport

== Managerial changes ==
Team	Outgoing manager	Manner of departure	Date of vacancy	Replaced by	Date of appointment	Position in table
Apertura Changes
Coras	(Italy) Mauro Camoranesi	Resigned	August 18, 2015	(Mexico) José Luis González China	August 21, 2015	14th
Tapachula	(Mexico) Carlos de los Cobos	Sacked	August 22, 2015	(Mexico) Benjamín Mora (Interim)	August 27, 2015	16th
UAT	(Mexico) Ricardo Cadena	Sacked	August 22, 2015	(Mexico) José Treviño	August 27, 2015	15th
Tapachula	(Mexico) Benjamín Mora (Interim)	End of tenure as caretaker	September 5, 2015	(Mexico) Gabriel Caballero	September 7, 2015	16th
Sonora	(Mexico) Jorge Humberto Torres	Sacked	September 15, 2015	(Spain) Javier López (Interim)	September 15, 2015	12th
Venados	(Mexico) Juan Carlos Chávez	Sacked	October 3, 2015	(Uruguay) Daniel Rossello (Interim)	October 15, 2015	14th
Oaxaca	(Mexico) Ricardo Rayas	Sacked	October 21, 2015	(Mexico) Marco Antonio Trejo (Interim)	October 21, 2015	5th
Necaxa	(Mexico) Miguel Fuentes	Sacked	November 9, 2015	(Mexico) Miguel Acosta & (Mexico) Hugo Saucedo (Interim)	November 9, 2015	7th
Pre-Clausura Changes
Atlético San Luis	(Mexico) Raúl Arias	Resigned	November 19, 2015	(Argentina) Carlos Bustos	November 30, 2015	Preseason
Sonora	(Spain) Javier López (Interim)	End of tenure as caretaker	November 15, 2015	(Mexico) Héctor Medrano	November 26, 2015	Preseason
Venados	(Uruguay) Daniel Rossello (Interim)	End of tenure as caretaker	November 15, 2015	(Mexico) Marcelo Michel Leaño	November 26, 2015	Preseason
Necaxa	(Mexico) Miguel Acosta & (Mexico) Hugo Saucedo (Interim)	End of tenure as caretaker	November 15, 2015	(Mexico) Alfonso Sosa	November 26, 2015	Preseason
Clausura Changes
Murciélagos	(Mexico) Lorenzo López	Sacked	January 28, 2016	(Mexico) Jorge Manrique	January 28, 2016	16th
Coras	(Mexico) José Luis González China	Sacked	February 7, 2016	(Argentina) Hernán Cristante	February 13, 2016	14th
Zacatecas	(Mexico) Joel Sánchez	Sacked	February 9, 2016	(Mexico) Ricardo Rayas	February 9, 2016	13th
Murciélagos	(Mexico) Jorge Manrique	Sacked	February 25, 2016	(Mexico) Roberto Castro (Interim)	February 26, 2016	16th
Murciélagos	(Mexico) Roberto Castro (Interim)	End of tenure as caretaker	March 2, 2016	(Mexico) Adolfo García	March 5, 2016	16th

== Apertura 2015 ==
Pos	Team	Pld	W	D	L	GF	GA	GD	Pts	Qualification
1	BUAP (A)	15	8	5	2	28	14	+14	29	Qualified to Semifinals
2	Juárez (A)	15	8	5	2	24	14	+10	29	Qualified to Quarterfinals
3	Oaxaca (A)	15	7	4	4	23	19	+4	25	Qualified to Quarterfinals
4	Zacatecas (A)	15	7	3	5	31	22	+9	24	Qualified to Quarterfinals
5	Murciélagos (A)	15	7	3	5	23	21	+2	24	Qualified to Quarterfinals
6	Atlante (A)	15	6	5	4	20	15	+5	23	Qualified to Quarterfinals
7	Tapachula (A)	15	7	1	7	20	30	−10	22	Qualified to Quarterfinals
8	UdeG (E)	15	5	6	4	25	16	+9	21	
9	Atlético San Luis (E)	15	6	3	6	23	26	−3	21	
10	Necaxa (E)	15	6	2	7	24	21	+3	20	
11	Coras (E)	15	4	8	3	22	21	+1	20	
12	Celaya (E)	15	5	5	5	16	19	−3	20	
13	Venados (E)	15	4	3	8	20	26	−6	15	
14	Zacatepec (E)	15	3	4	8	22	31	−9	13	Eliminated from Copa MX Clausura 2016
15	UAT (E)	15	3	4	8	14	28	−14	13	Eliminated from Copa MX Clausura 2016
16	Sonora (E)	15	1	5	9	13	25	−12	8	Eliminated from Copa MX Clausura 2016

Updated to match(es) played on November 7, 2015. Source:
Rules for classification: 1) points; 2) goal difference; 3) number of goals scored.
(A) Advance to a further round; (E) Eliminated

=== Results ===
Home \ Away	ATE	ATL	BUP	CEL	COR	JUA	MUR	NEC	OAX	SON	TAP	UDG	UAT	VEN	ZAS	ZAC
Atlante			0–0			2–0		0–1	1–0	3–2	1–2		2–0			
Atlético San Luis	1–3			1–0	0–1	0–1	5–1					2–2			2–0	3–1
BUAP		4–0		0–0	0–0			2–1				3–2		2–1		2–1
Celaya	2–2					2–2			2–1		0–3	0–1	1–0		3–1	
Coras	2–2			1–1		1–3	3–3		1–2			0–0	1–1		0–3	
Juárez			1–0				2–1	1–3	1–1	4–0	2–0		0–0	2–1		
Murciélagos	1–0		2–1	1–2				2–1		2–0	4–0	1–2			1–0	
Necaxa		3–0		3–0	1–2							0–3		2–3	2–3	1–1
Oaxaca		2–3	2–2				1–1	1–1		1–0	0–1		3–2	3–1		
Sonora		3–4	1–2	0–0	0–0			1–2						0–1		1–1
Tapachula		3–0	0–3		3–3			2–1		0–4				1–0		3–2
U. de G.	0–0					0–0			1–2	0–0	3–1		7–1		2–2	
UAT		1–1	1–5				0–1	0–2		1–1	3–1			1–0		2–1
Venados	2–2	1–1		0–1	0–2		3–1					2–1			2–4	3–3
Zacatecas	1–2		2–2			2–2			1–2	4–0	4–0		2–1			
Zacatepec	1–0			3–2	2–5	1–3	1–1		1–2			2–1			1–2	

Updated to match(es) played on 14 November 2015. Source:
Legend: Blue = home team win; Yellow = draw; Red = away team win.

=== Liguilla (Playoffs) ===
The six best teams after the first place play two games against each other on a home-and-away basis. The winner of each match up is determined by aggregate score. If the teams are tied, the Away goals rule applies.

The teams were seeded one to seven in quarterfinals, and will be re-seeded one to four in semifinals, depending on their position in the general table. The higher seeded teams play on their home field during the second leg.

Quarterfinals
4	Zacatecas	2	2	4
5	Murciélagos	2	0	2
3	Oaxaca	2	1	3
6	Atlante	0	4	4
2	Juárez	1	1	2
7	Tapacula	1	0	1

Semifinals
1	BUAP	0	3	3
6	Atlante (a)	1	2	3
2	Juárez	1	1	2
4	Zacatecas	1	0	1

Finals
2	Juárez	0	3	3
6	Atlante	1	0	1

- If the two teams are tied after both legs, the away goals rule applies. If both teams still tied, higher seeded team advances.
- Teams are re-seeded every round.
- The winner will qualify to the playoff match vs (Clausura 2016 Champions) . However, if the winner is the same in both tournaments, they would be the team promoted to the 2016–17 Liga MX season without playing the Promotional Final

==== Quarter-finals ====
Team 1	Agg.	Team 2	1st leg	2nd leg
Juárez	2–1	Tapachula	1–1	1–0
Oaxaca	3–4	Atlante	2–0	1–4
Zacatecas	4–2	Murciélagos	2–2	2–0

All times are UTC−6 except for matches in Cancún, Ciudad Juárez and Los Mochis.

===== First leg =====
18 November 2015	Tapachula	1–1	Juárez	Tapachula
18:00	I. Valadéz 28'	Report	L. Carrijó 60'	Stadium: Estadio Olímpico de Tapachula; Attendance: 5,814; Referee: Adalid Maganda Villalba

18 November 2015	Atlante	0–2	Oaxaca	Cancún
21:00		Report	A. Ledesma 49'; J. Moreno 69'	Stadium: Estadio Andrés Quintana Roo; Attendance: 3,379; Referee: Christian Adrián Ramírez Tejeda

18 November 2015	Murciélagos	2–2	Zacatecas	Los Mochis
21:00	P. Ibarra 16'; L. Luján 72'	Report	Y. Rivera 17'; M. Velázquez 87'	Stadium: Estadio Centenario; Attendance: 4,560; Referee: Jonathan Hernández Juárez

===== Second leg =====
21 November 2015	Oaxaca	1–4 (3–4 agg.)	Atlante	Oaxaca
17:00	S. San Román 68'	Report	C. Garcés 3', 90+4'; C. Cauich 12'; G. Hachen 20'	Stadium: Estadio Benito Juárez; Attendance: 9,500; Referee: Angel Monroy Bello

21 November 2015	Juárez	1–0 (2–1 agg.)	Tapachula	Ciudad Juárez
18:00	W. de Jesús 90+2'	Report		Stadium: Estadio Olímpico Benito Juárez; Attendance: 15,390; Referee: Jesús Leopoldo Guerrero García

21 November 2015	Zacatecas	2–0 (4–2 agg.)	Murciélagos	Zacatecas
21:00	N. Maya 54'; M. Velázquez 80'	Report		Stadium: Estadio Francisco Villa; Attendance: 11,572; Referee: Uriel Olvera Ríos

==== Semi-finals ====
Team 1	Agg.	Team 2	1st leg	2nd leg
BUAP	3–3	Atlante (a)	0–1	3–2
Juárez	2–1	Zacatecas	1–1	1–0

===== First leg =====
25 November 2015	Zacatecas	1–1	Juárez	Zacatecas
21:00	J. Cuevas 46'	Report	L. Carrijó 6'	Stadium: Estadio Francisco Villa; Attendance: 12,089; Referee: Christian Adrián Ramírez Tejeda

26 November 2015	Atlante	1–0	BUAP	Cancún
20:00	C. Cauich 80'	Report		Stadium: Estadio Andrés Quintana Roo; Attendance: 9,680; Referee: Jesús Leopoldo Guerrero García

===== Second leg =====
28 November 2015	Juárez	1–0 (2–1 agg.)	Zacatecas	Ciudad Juárez
16:00	M. Ortíz 7'	Report		Stadium: Estadio Olímpico Benito Juárez; Attendance: 18,975; Referee: Ángel Monroy Bello

29 November 2015	BUAP	3–2 (3–3 agg.)	Atlante	Puebla
17:00	D. Jiménez 42', 90+1'; P. Gómez 88'	Report	G. Hachen 60'; E. Prono 75'	Stadium: Estadio Universitario BUAP; Attendance: 14,835; Referee: Uriel Olvera Ríos

==== Final ====
Team 1	Agg.	Team 2	1st leg	2nd leg
Juárez	3–1	Atlante	0–1	3–0

===== First leg =====
2 December 2015	Atlante	1–0	Juárez	Cancún
20:00	C. Garcés 45'	Report		Stadium: Estadio Andrés Quintana Roo; Attendance: 13,100; Referee: Adalid Maganda Villalva

===== Second leg =====
5 December 2015	Juárez	3–0 (3–1 agg.)	Atlante	Ciudad Juárez
16:00	W. de Jesús 5'; É. Mejía 46'; L. Carrijó 78'	Report		Stadium: Estadio Olímpico Benito Juárez; Attendance: 19,900; Referee: Jonathan Hernández Juárez

Apertura 2015 winners:

1st title

== Clausura 2016 ==
Pos	Team	Pld	W	D	L	GF	GA	GD	Pts	Qualification
1	UdeG (A)	15	9	2	4	22	15	+7	29	Qualified to Semifinals
2	Necaxa (A)	15	8	4	3	21	12	+9	28	Qualified to Quarterfinals
3	Tapachula (A)	15	8	3	4	14	8	+6	27	Qualified to Quarterfinals
4	Celaya (A)	15	8	2	5	20	13	+7	26	Qualified to Quarterfinals
5	Atlante (A)	15	7	4	4	22	12	+10	25	Qualified to Quarterfinals
6	Zacatecas (A)	15	4	10	1	17	13	+4	22	Qualified to Quarterfinals
7	UAT (A)	15	6	4	5	13	17	−4	22	Qualified to Quarterfinals
8	Oaxaca (E)	15	5	6	4	19	19	0	21	
9	Venados (E)	15	5	5	5	17	14	+3	20	
10	Juárez (E)	15	5	5	5	13	12	+1	20	
11	Coras (E)	15	6	1	8	20	19	+1	19	
12	BUAP (E)	15	5	3	7	17	22	−5	18	
13	Murciélagos (E)	15	5	1	9	18	30	−12	16	
14	Zacatepec (E)	15	2	7	6	15	23	−8	13	
15	Atlético San Luis (E)	15	2	5	8	11	20	−9	11	
16	Sonora (E)	15	2	4	9	12	22	−10	10	Eliminated from Copa MX Apertura 2016

Updated to match(es) played on April 10, 2016. Source:
Rules for classification: 1) points; 2) goal difference; 3) number of goals scored.
(A) Advance to a further round; (E) Eliminated

=== Results ===
Home \ Away	ATE	ATL	BUP	CEL	COR	JUA	MUR	NEC	OAX	SON	TAP	UDG	UAT	VEN	ZAS	ZAC
Atlante		1–0		2–0	3–0		1–0					3–0		0–0	2–2	4–1
Atlético San Luis			1–2					0–1	2–1	1–1	0–0		0–3	2–0		
BUAP	1–0					1–1	3–0		1–2	2–0	0–1		0–1		1–1	
Celaya		2–0	3–0		1–0		3–1	4–2		2–0				1–0		2–0
Coras		3–1	2–0					0–0		2–3	0–1			1–0		2–1
Juárez	1–0	1–1		1–0	1–2							3–0			0–0	0–0
Murciélagos		1–0			0–6	1–0			3–2				5–0	0–1		2–1
Necaxa	2–1		2–0			1–0	4–0		0–0	4–2	1–0		3–1			
Oaxaca	3–3			0–0	1–0	1–0						1–2			1–1	3–3
Sonora	1–2					0–1	2–1		1–1		0–1	0–1	0–0		2–3	
Tapachula	1–0			2–1		0–0	2–1		3–1			1–0	0–1		0–1	
U. de G.		2–1	2–3	3–0	3–1		2–1	0–0						2–0		2–0
UAT	0–0			2–1	3–1	0–3			0–1			0–2			0–0	
Venados			4–1			5–1		0–0	0–1	1–0	2–1		1–1			
Zacatecas		1–1		0–0	1–0		3–3	2–0				1–1		1–1		0–1
Zacatepec		1–1	2–2					2–1		0–0	1–1		0–1	2–2		

Updated to match(es) played on 16 April 2016. Source:
Legend: Blue = home team win; Yellow = draw; Red = away team win.

=== Liguilla (Playoffs) ===
The six best teams after the first place play two games against each other on a home-and-away basis. The winner of each match up is determined by aggregate score. If the teams are tied, the Away goals rule applies.

The teams were seeded one to seven in quarterfinals, and will be re-seeded one to four in semifinals, depending on their position in the general table. The higher seeded teams play on their home field during the second leg.

Quarterfinals
4	Celaya	1	0	1
5	Atlante	0	2	2
3	Tapachula	1	1	2
6	Zacatecas	2	1	3
2	Necaxa	1	1	2
7	UAT	0	1	1

Semifinals
1	UdeG	1	1	2
6	Zacatecas	1	2	3
2	Necaxa	2	3	5
5	Atlante	1	2	3

Finals
2	Necaxa	2	0	2
6	Zacatecas	0	0	0

- If the two teams are tied after both legs, the away goals rule applies. If both teams still tied, higher seeded team advances.
- Teams are re-seeded every round.
- The winner will qualify to the playoff match vs (F.C. Juárez)

==== Quarter-finals ====
Team 1	Agg.	Team 2	1st leg	2nd leg
Necaxa	2–1	UAT	1–0	1–1
Tapachula	2–3	Zacatecas	1–2	1–1
Celaya	1–2	Atlante	1–0	1–2

===== First leg =====
20 April 2016	UAT	0–1	Necaxa	Ciudad Victoria
18:30		Report	R. Prieto 11'	Stadium: Estadio Marte R. Gómez; Attendance: 5,995; Referee: Mario Humberto Vargas Mata

20 April 2016	Atlante	0–1	Celaya	Cancún
19:45		Report	O. Domínguez 41'	Stadium: Estadio Andrés Quintana Roo; Attendance: 3,385; Referee: Adalid Maganda Villaba

20 April 2016	Zacatecas	2–1	Tapachula	Zacatecas
21:15	R. Nurse 50', 70'	Report	J. Ayoví 66'	Stadium: Estadio Francisco Villa; Attendance: 8,685; Referee: Uriel Olvera Ríos

===== Second leg =====
23 April 2016	Tapachula	1–1 (2–3 agg.)	Zacatecas	Tapachula
18:00	B. Costa 56'	Report	R. Nurse 29'	Stadium: Estadio Olímpico de Tapachula; Attendance: 12,477; Referee: Jonathan Hernández Juárez

23 April 2016	Necaxa	1–1 (2–1 agg.)	UAT	Aguascalientes
19:45	R. Prieto 37'	Report	E. Guzmán 64'	Stadium: Estadio Victoria; Attendance: 10,706; Referee: Óscar Mejía García

23 April 2016	Celaya	0–2 (1–2 agg.)	Atlante	Celaya
21:15		Report	C. Garcés 49'; C. Galeana 53' (o.g.)	Stadium: Estadio Miguel Alemán Valdés; Attendance: 23,000; Referee: Ángel Monroy Bello

==== Semi-finals ====
Team 1	Agg.	Team 2	1st leg	2nd leg
UdeG	2–3	Zacatecas	1–1	1–2
Necaxa	5–3	Atlante	2–1	3–2

===== First leg =====
27 April 2016	Atlante	1–2	Necaxa	Cancún
20:00	A. López 90+2'	Report	M. Marroquín 48' (o.g.); R. Prieto 68'	Stadium: Estadio Andrés Quintana Roo; Attendance: 10,279; Referee: Óscar Mejía García

28 April 2016	Zacatecas	1–1	UdeG	Zacatecas
21:00	N. Maya 35'	Report	J. Mora 16'	Stadium: Estadio Francisco Villa; Attendance: 13,905; Referee: Mario Humberto Vargas Mata

===== Second leg =====
30 April 2016	Necaxa	3–2 (5–3 agg.)	Atlante	Aguascalientes
20:00	R. Prieto 57'; J. Barraza 62'; J. Isijara 68'	Report	C. Garcés 49'; F. Uscanga 81'	Stadium: Estadio Victoria; Attendance: 16,950; Referee: Ángel Monroy Bello

1 May 2016	UdeG	1–2 (2–3 agg.)	Zacatecas	Guadalajara
12:00	J. Mora 31'	Report	R. Nurse 30', 84'	Stadium: Estadio Jalisco; Attendance: 32,106; Referee: Uriel Olvera Ríos

==== Final ====
Team 1	Agg.	Team 2	1st leg	2nd leg
Necaxa	0–2	Zacatecas	0–2	0–0

===== First leg =====
4 May 2016	Zacatecas	0–2	Necaxa	Zacatecas
21:00		Report	F. Gallegos 50'; J. Isijara 64'	Stadium: Estadio Francisco Villa; Attendance: 13,905; Referee: Jonathan Hernández Juárez

===== Second leg =====
7 May 2016	Necaxa	0–0 (2–0 agg.)	Zacatecas	Aguascalientes
20:00		Report		Stadium: Estadio Victoria; Attendance: 21,233; Referee: Óscar Mejía García

Clausura 2016 winners:

4th title

== Campeón de Ascenso 2016 ==
=== First leg ===
May 14, 2016
20:00

Necaxa	1–0	Juárez
Jahir Barraza 77'	Report

Estadio Victoria
Aguascalientes

=== Second leg ===
May 21, 2016
20:00 (central); 19:00 (local)

Juárez	0–2	Necaxa
	Report	Luis Gallegos 11'; Jorge Sánchez 44'

Estadio Olímpico Benito Juárez

Champions

2nd title

== Relegation table ==
The team would normally be the team with the lowest ratio by summing the points scored in the following tournaments: Apertura 2013, Clausura 2014, Apertura 2014, Clausura 2015, Apertura 2015 and Clausura 2016. This Season, no team will be relegated to Liga Premier de Ascenso (will resume next season).

Pos	Team	Total Pts	Total Pld	Avg
1	UdeG	50	30	1.6666
2	Juárez	49	30	1.6333
3	Necaxa	137	84	1.6309
4	UAT	130	84	1.5476
5	Zacatecas	129	84	1.5357
6	Oaxaca	127	84	1.5119
7	Coras	84	56	1.5000
8	BUAP	125	84	1.4880
9	Atlante	82	56	1.4642
10	Tapachula	114	84	1.3571
11	Atlético San Luis	110	84	1.3095
12	Venados	107	84	1.2738
13	Murciélagos	96	84	1.1428
14	Zacatepec	91	84	1.0833
15	Celaya	90	84	1.0714
16	Sonora	18	30	0.6000
