= 2016–17 Ascenso MX season =

Season of a Mexican football league

Ascenso MX
- Season: 2016–17
- Champions: Apertura: Dorados de Sinaloa; Clausura: Lobos BUAP
- Promoted: Lobos BUAP
- Relegated: U. de C.
- Matches: 261
- Goals: 661 (2.53 per match)
- Top goalscorer: Apertura: Roberto Nurse (16); Clausura: Diego Jiménez (10)
- Biggest home win: Apertura: Dorados 5–0 Lobos BUAP (July 30, 2016); UAEM 6–1 Venados (October 21, 2016); Atlante 5-0 U. de C. (November 11, 2016)
- Biggest away win: Apertura: Venados 0–5 Celaya (August 26, 2016)
- Highest scoring: Apertura: Cafetaleros 3–4 U. de C. (August 6, 2016); UAEM 6–1 Venados (October 21, 2016)
- Longest winning run: Apertura: Sonora; Celaya; Atlante (3 games); Clausura: Dorados (5 games)
- Longest unbeaten run: Apertura: Coras (5 games); Clausura: Dorados (7 games)
- Longest winless run: Apertura: Venados (7 games); Clausura: Venados (11 games)
- Longest losing run: Apertura: Venados (3 games); Clausura: U. de. C. (4 Games)
- Highest attendance: Apertura: Cimarrones vs Atlante (11,860); Clausura: Tampico Madero vs FC Juárez (19,415); Tampico Madero VS UAT (19,415)
- Lowest attendance: Apertura: Correcaminos vs Dorados (782); Clausura: U. de C. vs Atlante (690)
- Average attendance: Apertura: 5,338; Clausura: 5,545

The 2016–17 Ascenso MX season is a two-part competition: Apertura 2016 began on 15 July 2016 and Clausura 2017. Ascenso MX is the second-tier football league of Mexico. All Ascenso MX teams except UAEM, U. de C., Tampico Madero, Correcaminos, Zacatepec and Sonora, will participate in Copa MX. The fixtures were announced on 9 June 2016.

== Changes from the previous season ==
- Necaxa were promoted to Liga MX.
- Sinaloa were relegated from Liga MX.
- U. de C. will join from Segunda División de México (due to stadium requirements failed in 2015, approved in 2016).
- UAEM were promoted from Segunda División de México
- Tampico Madero were promoted to Ascenso MX as an expansion team, will take the open spot vacated by Atlético San Luis.
- Atlético San Luis were dissolved and may return to play next season.

== Stadiums and Locations ==
Club	City	Stadium	Capacity
Atlante	Cancún, Quintana Roo	Andrés Quintana Roo	17,289
BUAP	Puebla City, Puebla	Universitario BUAP	19,283
Celaya	Celaya, Guanajuato	Miguel Alemán Valdés	23,182
Coras	Tepic, Nayarit	Arena Cora	12,271
Juárez	Ciudad Juárez, Chihuahua	Olímpico Benito Juárez	19,703
Murciélagos	Los Mochis, Sinaloa	Centenario	11,134
Oaxaca	Oaxaca City, Oaxaca	Tecnológico de Oaxaca	14,598
Sinaloa	Culiacán, Sinaloa	Banorte	17,898
Sonora	Hermosillo, Sonora	Héroe de Nacozari	18,747
Tampico Madero	Tampico / Ciudad Madero, Tamaulipas	Tamaulipas	19,667
Tapachula	Tapachula, Chiapas	Olímpico de Tapachula	11,018
U. de C.	Colima City, Colima	Olímpico Universitario de Colima	11,812
U. de G.	Guadalajara, Jalisco	Jalisco	55,020
UAEM	Toluca, State of Mexico	Universitario Alberto "Chivo" Córdoba	32,603
UAT	Ciudad Victoria, Tamaulipas	Marte R. Gómez	10,520
Venados	Mérida, Yucatán	Carlos Iturralde	15,087
Zacatecas	Zacatecas City, Zacatecas	Francisco Villa	13,820
Zacatepec	Zacatepec, Morelos	Agustín "Coruco" Díaz	24,313

Location of teams in the 2016–17 Ascenso MX

=== Personnel and kits ===
Team	Chairman	Head coach	Captain	Kit manufacturer	Shirt sponsor(s)
Atlante	Eduardo Braun Burillo	(Mexico) Eduardo Fentanes	(Mexico) Juan de la Barrera	Kappa	Riviera Maya
BUAP	Rafael Cañedo	(Mexico) Rafael Puente, Jr.	(Mexico) Omar Tejeda	Keuka	Coca-Cola
Celaya	Marcos Achar	(Argentina) Gerardo Reinoso (Interim)	(Argentina) Alfredo Moreno	Keuka	Bachoco
Coras	José Luis Higuera	(Mexico) Marcelo Michel Leaño	(Mexico) Sergio Flores	Bee Sport	Riviera Nayarit
Juárez	Juan Carlos Talavera	(Mexico) Miguel Fuentes	(Brazil) Leandro Carrijó	Umbro	Del Río
Murciélagos	Miguel Favela	(Chile) Marco Antonio Figueroa	(Mexico) Valentín Arredondo	Keuka	Meprosa
Oaxaca	Santiago San Román	(Mexico) Irving Rubirosa	(Uruguay) Lucero Álvarez	Lotto	Ópticas América
Sinaloa	José Antonio Núñez	(Mexico) Gabriel Caballero	(Mexico) Carlos Pinto	Charly	Coppel
Sonora	Servando Carbajal	(Mexico) Juan Carlos Chávez	(Mexico) Othoniel Arce	Lotto	Súper del Norte
Tampico Madero	Javier San Román	(Mexico) Daniel Guzmán	(Argentina) Daniel Ludueña	Lotto	B Hermanos
Tapachula	Gabriel Orantes Constanzo	(Mexico) Paco Ramírez	(Mexico) Héctor Morales	Silver Sport	Cafetaleros de Corazón
U. de C.	Carlos Salas	(Mexico) Víctor Hugo Mora	(Mexico) Rodolfo Espinoza	Pirma	
U. de G.	José Alberto Castellanos	(Mexico) Joel Sánchez	(Uruguay) Ribair Rodríguez	Charly	Electrolit
UAEM	Jorge Olvera García	(Mexico) Omar Ramírez	(Mexico) Alfonso Rippa	Lotto	Megacable
UAT	Rafael Flores Alcocer	(Mexico) Jaime Ordiales	(Mexico) Hugo Sánchez	Lotto	Aeromar
Venados	Rodolfo Rosas Cantillo	(Argentina) Bruno Marioni	(Argentina) Luis Acuña	Spiro	
Zacatecas	Armando Martínez Patiño	(Mexico) Ricardo Rayas	(Mexico) Noé Maya	Pirma	Telcel
Zacatepec	Rodolfo Davis Contreras	(Mexico) Carlos Gutiérrez	(Mexico) Héctor Gutiérrez	Silver Sport	Jardines de México

== Managerial changes ==
Team	Outgoing manager	Manner of departure	Date of vacancy	Replaced by	Date of appointment	Position in table
Apertura changes
Venados	(Mexico) Marcelo Michel Leaño	Sacked	August 6, 2016	(Mexico) José Luis Sánchez Solá	August 10, 2016	18th
Tapachula	(Argentina) Carlos Bustos	Sacked	August 27, 2016	(Italy) Mauro Camoranesi	August 30, 2016	16th
Murciélagos	(Mexico) Adolfo García	Sacked	September 15, 2016	(Argentina) Aldo Da Pozzo	September 15, 2016	15th
Tampico Madero	(Mexico) Miguel García	Sacked	September 20, 2016	(Mexico) Daniel Guzmán	September 20, 2016	18th
Lobos BUAP	(Mexico) Miguel Fuentes	Sacked	September 25, 2016	(Mexico) Hiram Bandala (Interim)	September 25, 2016	14th
Lobos BUAP	(Mexico) Hiram Bandala (Interim)	End of tenure as caretaker	October 5, 2016	(Mexico) Rafael Puente, Jr.	October 5, 2016	14th
Pre-Clausura changes
UAT	(Mexico) José Treviño	Sacked	November 14, 2016	(Mexico) Jorge Urbina (Interim)	December 11, 2016	Preseason
Juárez	(Mexico) Sergio Orduña	Sacked	November 15, 2016	(Mexico) Miguel Fuentes	December 1, 2016	Preseason
Coras	(Mexico) Ramón Morales	Mutual agreement	November 23, 2016	(Mexico) Marcelo Michel Leaño	November 30, 2016	Preseason
Oaxaca	(Mexico) Mario García	Sacked	December 29, 2016	(Mexico) Irving Rubirosa	December 29, 2016	Preseason
UAT	(Mexico) Jorge Urbina (Interim)	End of tenure as caretaker	January 4, 2017	(Mexico) Jaime Ordiales	January 4, 2017	Preseason
Celaya	(Uruguay) Gustavo Díaz	Resigned	January 4, 2017	(Mexico) Luis Padilla (Interim)	January 5, 2017	Preseason
Clausura changes
Murciélagos	(Argentina) Aldo Da Pozzo	Sacked	January 14, 2017	(Chile) Marco Antonio Figueroa	January 16, 2017	18th
Tapachula	(Italy) Mauro Camoranesi	Mutual agreement	January 22, 2017	(Mexico) Paco Ramírez	January 23, 2017	16th
Celaya	(Mexico) Luis Padilla (Interim)	End of tenure as caretaker	January 27, 2017	(Mexico) Gustavo Vargas	January 27, 2017	5th
Venados	(Mexico) José Luis Sánchez Solá	Resigned	January 27, 2017	(Argentina) Bruno Marioni	January 29, 2017	17th
Celaya	(Mexico) Gustavo Vargas	Sacked	March 28, 2017	(Argentina) Gerardo Reinoso (Interim)	March 28, 2017	12th

== Apertura 2016 ==
Pos	Team	Pld	W	D	L	GF	GA	GD	Pts	Qualification or relegation
1	Celaya (A)	17	10	5	2	36	13	+23	35	Advance to Liguilla
2	Zacatecas (A)	17	10	3	4	34	20	+14	33	Advance to Liguilla
3	Zacatepec (A)	17	8	6	3	27	19	+8	30	Advance to Liguilla
4	UAEM (A)	17	8	5	4	24	18	+6	29	Advance to Liguilla
5	Sinaloa (A, C)	17	7	6	4	28	16	+12	27	Advance to Liguilla
6	Atlante (A)	17	7	6	4	26	17	+9	27	Advance to Liguilla
7	Sonora (A)	17	7	6	4	22	21	+1	27	Advance to Liguilla
8	Oaxaca (A)	17	7	5	5	20	14	+6	26	Advance to Liguilla
9	Coras	17	5	7	5	22	20	+2	22	
10	Juárez	17	6	4	7	18	17	+1	22	
11	UAT	17	5	5	7	12	16	−4	20	
12	Venados	17	5	5	7	20	34	−14	20	
13	Murciélagos	17	5	4	8	18	24	−6	19	Eliminated from Copa MX Clausura 2017
14	U. de G.	17	4	6	7	23	26	−3	18	Eliminated from Copa MX Clausura 2017
15	BUAP	17	4	6	7	15	26	−11	18	Eliminated from Copa MX Clausura 2017
16	Tapachula	17	4	4	9	21	32	−11	16	Eliminated from Copa MX Clausura 2017
17	U. de C.	17	3	5	9	20	34	−14	14	Team is last in relegation table
18	Tampico Madero	17	2	4	11	8	27	−19	10	Eliminated from Copa MX Clausura 2017

Updated to match(es) played on September 4, 2016. Source:
Rules for classification: 1) points; 2) goal difference; 3) number of goals scored.
(A) Advance to a further round; (C) Champions

=== Results ===
Home \ Away	ATE	BUP	CEL	COR	JUA	MUR	OAX	SIN	SON	TAM	TAP	UDC	UDG	UAM	UAT	VEN	ZAS	ZAC
Atlante					2–1			1–1		0–0		5–0	2–1	0–1	3–2		2–2	
BUAP	1–1		1–2		2–0	0–0					2–1	1–0		1–1	0–1			
Celaya	1–1				2–0			0–0		3–0	3–2	3–0	2–1	2–1	3–0		5–1	
Coras	0–3	2–1	2–2		0–1	1–1					4–0	3–1			0–0			
Juárez							1–1		2–1	3–0			1–1	2–0		4–0	0–1	1–2
Murciélagos	3–1		0–0		0–0					2–0	3–2	1–0		1–2	2–0			
Oaxaca	1–0	1–0	1–1	1–1		4–1			0–1		1–0				0–0			
Sinaloa		5–0		1–1	3–0	2–0	1–1		1–2	5–1		2–0		0–1				
Sonora	0–1	2–3	2–0	1–1		2–1					1–1	3–2			1–0			
Tampico Madero		0–0		0–0			2–1		1–2				0–1			1–2	1–0	0–1
Tapachula	0–2		3–2		1–1			1–0		2–0		3–4	3–3	1–1	1–0			
U. de C.					2–1		1–2			2–2			1–1	0–0		2–0	3–3	1–3
U. de G.		1–1		1–2		2–1	1–3	2–3	1–1							1–1	0–1	0–2
UAEM				2–1			1–0	3–3	1–1	1–0			2–4			6–1	2–1	2–2
Correcaminos UAT					0–0			0–1		2–0		1–1	0–2	1–0		2–0	3–2	0–0
Venados		5–1	0–5	2–1		3–1	1–3	1–1	1–1		2–0						4–4	0–0
Zacatecas		1–1		2–1		3–1	1–0	3–0	4–0		2–0					4–0		3–1
Zacatepec	2–1	3–0	0–3	1–2		2–0	1–1	2–2	1–1		4–2							

Updated to match(es) played on 13 November 2016. Source:
Legend: Blue = home team win; Yellow = draw; Red = away team win.

=== Season statistics ===
==== Top goalscorers ====
Players sorted first by goals scored, then by last name.

Rank	Player	Club	Goals
1	(Panama) Roberto Nurse	Zacatecas	16
2	(Paraguay) Gustavo Ramírez	Zacatecas	12
3	(Chile) Sergio Vergara	Celaya	11
4	(Mexico) Ismael Valadéz	U. de G.	10
5	(Brazil) Douglas Tanque	Tapachula	9
6	(Mexico) Guillermo Martínez	Coras	8
7	(Uruguay) Jonathan Ramis	Zacatepec	7
7	(Mexico) Oscar Villa	Sonora	7
7	(Argentina) Gabriel Hachen	Sinaloa	7
7	(Brazil) Leandro Carrijó	Juárez	7

Source: ESPN FC

==== Hat-tricks ====
Player	For	Against	Result	Date
(Mexico) Jorge Mora	U. de G.	UAEM	2–4	16 July 2016
(Panama) Roberto Nurse	Zacatecas	Sonora	4–0	22 July 2016
(Argentina) Gabriel Hachen	Sinaloa	BUAP	5–0	30 July 2016
(Paraguay) Gustavo Ramírez	Zacatecas	Venados	4–0	2 September 2016

=== Liguilla (Playoffs) ===
The eight best teams play two games against each other on a home-and-away basis. The winner of each match up is determined by aggregate score. If the teams are tied, the away goals rule applies. The higher seeded teams play on their home field during the second leg.

Quarterfinals
1	Celaya	1	3	4
8	Oaxaca	2	0	2
3	Zacatepec	0	1	1
6	Atlante	1	1	2
2	Zacatecas (a)	3	1	4
7	Sonora	2	2	4
4	UAEM	1	3	4
5	Sinaloa (a)	1	3	4

Semifinals
1	Celaya	0	0	0
6	Atlante	1	0	1
2	Zacatecas	0	4	4
5	Sinaloa (a)	3	1	4

Final
6	Atlante	2	0	2
5	Sinaloa	3	1	4

- If the two teams are tied after both legs, the away goals rule applies. If both teams still tied, higher seeded team advances.
- Teams are re-seeded every round.
- The winner will qualify to the playoff match vs (Clausura 2017 Champions) . However, if the winner is the same in both tournaments, they would be the team promoted to the 2017–18 Liga MX season without playing the Promotional Final

==== Quarterfinals ====
===== First leg =====
16 November	Oaxaca	2–1	Celaya	Oaxaca City, Oaxaca
19:30	D. Martínez 49'; L. Álvarez 69'		A. Riestra 33'	Stadium: Tecnológico de Oaxaca; Attendance: 7,550; Referee: Arutro Cruz Hurtado

16 November	Sinaloa	1–1	UAEM	Culiacán, Sinaloa
20:30	V. Angulo 49'		E. González 83'	Stadium: Banorte; Attendance: 10,333; Referee: Jesús Bisguerra Mendiola

17 November	Atlante	1–0	Zacatepec	Cancún, Quintana Roo
20:30	O. Uscanga 31'			Stadium: Andrés Quintana Roo; Attendance: 6,250; Referee: Alejandro Funk Villafañe

17 November	Sonora	2–3	Zacatecas	Hermosillo, Sonora
20:30	O. Villa 28'; L. Loroña 84'		R. Nurse 18', 73'; J. Cardozo 69'	Stadium: Héroe de Nacozari; Attendance: 9,100; Referee: Aldo Cano Martínez

===== Second leg =====
19 November	Celaya	3–0 (4–2 agg.)	Oaxaca	Celaya, Guanajuato
19:00	R. Alvarado 24'; A. Reyna 37'; R. Murguía 76'			Stadium: Miguel Alemán Valdés; Attendance: 15,000; Referee: Adalid Maganda Villalva

19 November	UAEM	3–3 (4–4 agg.)	Sinaloa (a)	Toluca, State of Mexico
16:00	M. Hipólito 9', 91'; A. López 26'		G. Hachen 59'; V. Angulo 64'; P. Torres 73'	Stadium: Universitario Alberto "Chivo" Córdoba; Attendance: 6,932; Referee: Jonathan Hernández Juárez

20 November	Zacatepec	1–1 (1–2 agg.)	Atlante	Zacatepec, Morelos
18:00	M. Romero 82'		E. Reyes 59'	Stadium: Agustín "Coruco" Díaz; Attendance: 22,146; Referee: Oscar Mejia Garcia

20 November	Zacatecas (a)	1–2 (4–4 agg.)	Sonora	Zacatecas City, Zacatecas
20:00	D. Torres 45' (o.g.)		L. Loroña 61'; O. Villa 78'	Stadium: Francisco Villa; Attendance: 8,124; Referee: Uriel Olvera Rios

==== Semifinals ====
===== First leg =====
23 November	Atlante	1–0	Celaya	Cancún, Quintana Roo
19:30	F. Uscanga 83'			Stadium: Andrés Quintana Roo; Attendance: 9,010; Referee: Uriel Olvera Rios

23 November	Sinaloa	3–0	Zacatecas	Culiacán, Sinaloa
21:30	V. Angulo 27', 46'; P. Torres 90'			Stadium: Banorte; Attendance: 12,333; Referee: Adalid Maganda Villalva

===== Second leg =====
26 November	Zacatecas	4–1 (4–4 agg.)	Sinaloa (a)	Zacatecas City, Zacatecas
17:00	M. Laínez 55'; H. Olvera 58'; L. Madrigal 67'; G. Ramírez 85'		P. Torres 18'	Stadium: Francisco Villa; Attendance: 7,164; Referee: Jonathan Hernández Juárez

26 November	Celaya	0–0 (0–1 agg.)	Atlante	Celaya, Guanajuato
19:00				Stadium: Miguel Alemán Valdés; Attendance: 19,763; Referee: Oscar Mejia Garcia

==== Final ====
===== First leg =====
30 November	Atlante	2–3	Sinaloa	Cancún, Quintana Roo
19:30	C. Garcés 84', 89'		P. Torres 20', 70'; A. Mendoza 85'	Stadium: Andrés Quintana Roo; Attendance: 14,938; Referee: Uriel Olvera Rios

===== Second leg =====
3 December	Sinaloa	1–0 (4–2 agg.)	Atlante	Culiacán, Sinaloa
21:00	E. Castro 67'			Stadium: Banorte; Attendance: 19,333; Referee: Oscar Mejia Garcia

Apertura 2016 winners

4th title

== Clausura 2017 ==
=== Regular season ===
==== Standings ====
Pos	Team	Pld	W	D	L	GF	GA	GD	Pts	Qualification
1	Zacatecas	17	9	5	3	21	11	+10	32	Advance to Liguilla
2	Sinaloa	17	9	4	4	29	22	+7	31	Advance to Liguilla
3	Oaxaca	17	9	3	5	27	19	+8	30	Advance to Liguilla
4	Juárez	17	8	4	5	23	17	+6	28	Advance to Liguilla
5	UAEM	17	8	4	5	21	15	+6	28	Advance to Liguilla
6	BUAP (C, P)	17	8	3	6	30	26	+4	27	Advance to Liguilla
7	Zacatepec	17	8	3	6	23	22	+1	27	Advance to Liguilla
8	Sonora	17	8	3	6	20	19	+1	27	Advance to Liguilla
9	Coras	17	7	5	5	24	20	+4	26	
10	Tampico Madero	17	6	5	6	15	14	+1	23	
11	U. de G.	17	5	7	5	16	18	−2	22	
12	Tapachula	17	6	3	8	20	21	−1	21	
13	Atlante	17	5	6	6	17	18	−1	21	
14	Celaya	17	5	4	8	26	27	−1	19	
15	UAT	17	4	4	9	24	31	−7	16	
16	Venados	17	3	6	8	17	34	−17	15	
17	U. de C. (R)	17	4	2	11	18	27	−9	14	Team is last in relegation table
18	Murciélagos	17	3	5	9	13	23	−10	14	

Updated to match(es) played on April 15, 2017. Source:
Rules for classification: 1) points; 2) goal difference; 3) number of goals scored.
(C) Champions; (P) Promoted; (R) Relegated

==== Positions by round ====
Leader and qualification to playoffs
Qualification to playoffs
Last place in table

Team ╲ Round	1	2	3	4	5	6	7	8	9	10	11	12	13	14	15	16	17
Zacatecas	10	5	6	3	3	1	1	1	1	2	3	2	4	2	4	2	1
Sinaloa	8	12	5	11	12	11	11	11	6	4	1	1	1	1	1	1	2
Oaxaca	16	11	4	10	8	9	10	6	12	9	6	4	6	6	3	3	3
Juárez	11	7	12	7	5	4	9	5	11	13	10	11	7	8	9	8	4
UAEM	14	9	13	8	6	5	4	9	3	5	5	3	2	5	3	4	5
BUAP	2	3	10	14	15	14	13	13	13	11	8	9	10	7	7	9	6
Zacatepec	7	6	11	6	4	7	6	4	2	1	2	6	9	10	8	5	7
Sonora	15	17	17	15	11	10	12	10	5	3	7	5	3	3	6	7	8
Coras	5	1	1	2	2	3	2	3	9	6	9	10	5	4	5	6	9
Tampico Madero	9	13	7	4	9	12	8	12	10	12	13	13	13	13	12	10	10
U. de G.	6	10	3	9	7	8	7	7	7	7	11	12	8	9	10	11	11
Tapachula	12	16	14	16	16	16	17	17	15	14	14	14	14	14	14	13	12
Atlante	3	4	2	1	1	2	5	2	4	8	4	7	10	11	11	12	13
Celaya	1	2	9	5	10	6	3	8	8	10	12	8	11	12	13	14	14
UAT	13	14	8	13	14	13	14	15	16	17	16	16	17	17	18	16	15
Venados	4	8	15	17	17	18	18	18	18	18	18	18	16	15	15	15	16
U. de C.	18	15	16	12	13	15	15	14	14	16	17	17	18	18	17	18	17
Murciélagos	17	18	18	18	18	17	16	16	17	15	15	15	15	16	16	17	18

Updated to match(es) played on 1 April 2017. Source: ascensomx.net

==== Results ====
Home \ Away	ATE	BUP	CEL	COR	JUA	MUR	OAX	SIN	SON	TAM	TAP	UDC	UDG	UAM	UAT	VEN	ZAS	ZAC
Atlante		2–2	1–2			0–1	2–0				2–2							1–0
BUAP				1–2			3–1	1–2	3–2	1–1						3–4		2–1
Celaya						2–1	1–2		3–1		2–3					4–0		2–3
Coras							0–1	1–1	0–1	0–1			1–0	1–1				3–2
Juárez		2–2		3–2		2–1		1–2			2–1	2–1			1–0			
Murciélagos		0–2		0–2			0–0		2–3							1–1	1–1	1–2
Oaxaca					3–2					3–0			0–0	1–1		3–2	0–2	
Sinaloa	2–4		1–0								2–0					4–1	1–0	1–1
Sonora					1–0		1–0	1–5		1–0			3–1	3–0			1–2	
Tampico Madero	0–1		2–1		1–2			1–1				2–0		1–0	3–0			
Tapachula				1–2			0–1		1–0							5–1	1–0	0–1
U. de C.		1–0	1–1	0–1		0–1		1–2	0–1		2–1							
U. de G.	0–0		1–1		1–0						3–1	1–0		1–0	3–2			
UAEM	1–0	4–1			1–0	2–0		1–0				3–1			1–1			
Correcaminos UAT	1–1	1–3	2–4	3–3		0–1					1–0							
Venados	1–2									0–0		2–0	1–1		1–5		0–0	
Zacatecas	1–0		0–0		0–0							2–2	2–0		1–0			
Zacatepec										1–0			1–1	1–3	1–0	3–1	1–3	

Updated to match(es) played on 5 March 2017. Source:
Legend: Blue = home team win; Yellow = draw; Red = away team win.

=== Regular season statistics ===
==== Top goalscorers ====
Players sorted first by goals scored, then by last name.

Rank	Player	Club	Goals
1	(Mexico) Diego Jiménez	BUAP	10
2	(Mexico) Éder Cruz	U. de C.	9
2	(Mexico) Ismael Valadéz	U. de G.	9
4	(Paraguay) (Mexico) Gustavo Ramírez	Zacatecas	8
4	(Chile) Patricio Rubio	Sinaloa	8
6	(Mexico) Jesús Angulo	Sinaloa	7
6	(Brazil) Leandro Carrijó	Juárez	7
6	(Mexico) Rodrigo Prieto	Zacatepec	7
9	(Venezuela) Giancarlo Maldonado	Oaxaca	6
9	(Colombia) Juan David Pérez	Celaya	6
9	(Mexico) Alfonso Tamay	Oaxaca	6
9	(Mexico) Francisco Uscanga	Atlante	6
9	(Mexico) Oscar Villa	Sonora	6

Source: AscensoMX.net

==== Hat-tricks ====
Player	For	Against	Result	Date
(Chile) Patricio Rubio	Sinaloa	Venados	4-1	4 February 2017
(Venezuela) Giancarlo Maldonado	Oaxaca	Tampico Madero	3-0	10 February 2017

=== Liguilla (Playoffs) ===
The eight best teams play two games against each other on a home-and-away basis. The winner of each match up is determined by aggregate score. If the teams are tied, the away goals rule applies. The higher seeded teams play on their home field during the second leg.

Quarterfinals
2	Sinaloa	0	4	4
7	Zacatepec	0	0	0
4	Juárez	1	3	4
5	UAEM	1	2	3
1	Zacatecas (a)	1	1	2
8	Sonora	2	0	2
3	Oaxaca	0	1	1
6	BUAP	1	1	2

Semifinals
2	Sinaloa	0	0	0
4	Juárez	1	2	3
1	Zacatecas	0	2	2
6	BUAP	2	4	6

Final
4	Juárez	1	1	2
6	BUAP	2	2	4

- Teams are re-seeded each round.
- Team with more goals on aggregate after two matches advances.
- Away goals rule is applied in the quarterfinals and semifinals, but not the final.
- In the quarterfinals and semifinals, if the two teams are tied on aggregate and away goals, the higher seeded team advances.
- In the final, if the two teams are tied after both legs, the match goes to extra-time and, if necessary, a shootout.
- The champion qualifies to the Promotion Final against Apertura 2016 champion Sinaloa.

==== Quarterfinals ====
Team 1	Agg.	Team 2	1st leg	2nd leg
Oaxaca	1–2	BUAP	1–0	1–1
Sinaloa	4–0	Zacatepec	0–0	4–0
Juárez	4-3	UAEM	1–1	3–2
Zacatecas (a)	2–2	Sonora	2–1	1–0

All times are UTC−6.

===== First leg =====
April 19, 2017	BUAP	1–0	Oaxaca	Puebla City, Puebla
19:30	A. Escoto 57'	Match Information; Report		Stadium: Universitario BUAP; Attendance: 9,338; Referee: Oscar Mejia Garcia

April 19, 2017	Zacatepec	0–0	Sinaloa	Zacatepec, Morelos
21:30		Match Information; Report		Stadium: Agustín "Coruco" Díaz; Attendance: 8,295; Referee: Jesús Bisguerra Mendiola

April 20, 2017	UAEM	1–1	Juárez	Toluca, State of Mexico
19:30	L. Carrijo 54'	Match Information; Report	D. Osorio 57'	Stadium: Universitario Alberto "Chivo" Córdoba; Attendance: 13,680; Referee: Mario Humberto Vargas Mata

April 20, 2017	Sonora	2–1	Zacatecas	Hermosillo, Sonora
21:30	J. Martínez 1' (o.g.); E. Alaffita 30'	Match Information; Report	L. Madrigal 48'	Stadium: Héroe de Nacozari; Attendance: 9,545; Referee: Juan Andres Esquivel Gonzalez

===== Second leg =====
April 22, 2017	Oaxaca	1–1 (1–2 agg.)	BUAP	Oaxaca City, Oaxaca
19:00	G. Maldonado 71' (pen.)	Match Information; Report	D. Jiménez 37'	Stadium: Tecnológico de Oaxaca; Attendance: 10,600; Referee: Jonathan Hernández Juárez

April 22, 2017	Sinaloa	4–0 (4–0 agg.)	Zacatepec	Culiacán, Sinaloa
21:00	J. Angulo 14', 77'; V. Angulo 69', 88'	Match Information; Report		Stadium: Banorte; Attendance: 14,333; Referee: Alejandro Funk Villafañe

April 23, 2017	Zacatecas (a)	1–0 (2–2 agg.)	Sonora	Zacatecas City, Zacatecas
17:00	J. Magallón 27'	Match Information; Report		Stadium: Francisco Villa; Attendance: 7,942; Referee: Arturo Cruz Hurtado

April 23, 2017	Juárez	3–2 (4–3 agg.)	UAEM	Ciudad Juárez, Chihuahua
20:00	L. Carrijo 18' (pen.); M. Fernández 38'; M. Ortíz 76'	Match Information; Report	D. Osorio 31' (pen.); E. Dias 14' (o.g.)	Stadium: Olímpico Benito Juárez; Attendance: 16,748; Referee: Adalid Maganda Villalva

==== Semifinals ====
Team 1	Agg.	Team 2	1st leg	2nd leg
Sinaloa	0–3	Juárez	1–0	0–2
Zacatecas	2–6	BUAP	2–0	2–4

All times are UTC−6.

===== First leg =====
April 26, 2017	Juárez	1–0	Sinaloa	Ciudad Juárez, Chihuahua
21:00	L. Carrijo 57'	Match Information; Report		Stadium: Olímpico Benito Juárez; Attendance: 19,150; Referee: Juan Andrés Esquivel González

April 27, 2017	BUAP	2–0	Zacatecas	Puebla City, Puebla
19:30	D. Jiménez 13', 89'	Match Information; Report		Stadium: Universitario BUAP; Attendance: 19,877; Referee: Alejandro Funk Villafañe

===== Second leg =====
April 29, 2017	Sinaloa	0–2 (0–3 agg.)	Juárez	Culiacán, Sinaloa
21:00		Match Information; Report	Lucas Xavier 47', 67'	Stadium: Banorte; Attendance: 17,333; Referee: Arturo Cruz Hurtado

April 30, 2017	Zacatecas	2–4 (2–6 agg.)	BUAP	Zacatecas City, Zacatecas
17:00	H. Olvera 16'; L. Madrigal 54'	Match Information; Report	A. Sánchez 10'; A. Escoto 30'; L. Olascoaga 42'; Ricardinho 89'	Stadium: Francisco Villa; Attendance: 10,587; Referee: Oscar Mejia Garcia

==== Final ====
Team 1	Agg.	Team 2	1st leg	2nd leg
Juárez	2–4	BUAP	2–1	1–2

All times are UTC−6.

===== First leg =====
May 3, 2017	BUAP	2-1	Juárez	Puebla City, Puebla
19:30	O. Tejeda 49' (pen.); D. Jiménez 71'	Match Information; Report	L. Carrijo 16'	Stadium: Universitario BUAP; Attendance: 19,893; Referee: Juan Andres Esquivel Gonzalez

===== Second leg =====
May 6, 2017	Juárez	1–2 (2–4 agg.)	BUAP	Ciudad Juárez, Chihuahua
20:00	C. Gordillo 73'	Match Information; Report	C. Cercado 25'; O. Tejeda 88'	Stadium: Olímpico Benito Juárez; Attendance: 20,322; Referee: Arturo Cruz Hurtado

Clausura 2017 winner

1st title

== Campeón de Ascenso 2017 ==
The Promotion Final is a two-legged playoff between the winners of the Apertura and Clausura tournaments to determine which team will be promoted to Liga MX. The Apertura 2016 champion was Sinaloa and the Clausura 2017 champion was BUAP. Since Sinaloa are higher ranked on the aggregate table for the 2016–17 season than BUAP, they will play the second leg at home.

All times are UTC−6.

=== First leg ===
May 13, 2017	BUAP	1–0	Sinaloa	Puebla City, Puebla
17:00	A. Escoto 23'	Match Information; Report		Stadium: Universitario BUAP; Attendance: 19,985; Referee: Alejandro Funk Villafañe

=== Second leg ===
May 20, 2017	Sinaloa	2–2 (2–3 agg.)	BUAP	Culiacán, Sinaloa
20:00	M. Velasco 1'; G. Hachen 29'	Match Information; Report	D. Jiménez 36'; A. Escoto 41'	Stadium: Banorte; Attendance: 19,333; Referee: Óscar Mejía García

Champions

1st title

== Aggregate table ==
The Aggregate Table is the general ranking for the 2016-17 season. This table is a sum of the Apertura and Clausura tournaments.

Pos	Team	Pld	W	D	L	GF	GA	GD	Pts	Qualification
1	Zacatecas	34	19	8	7	55	31	+24	65	
2	Sinaloa (C, Q)	34	16	10	8	57	38	+19	58	Advance to Promotion Final
3	UAEM	34	16	9	9	45	33	+12	57	
4	Zacatepec	34	16	9	9	50	41	+9	57	
5	Oaxaca	34	16	8	10	47	33	+14	56	
6	Celaya	34	15	9	10	62	40	+22	54	
7	Sonora	34	15	9	10	42	40	+2	54	
8	Juárez	34	14	8	12	41	34	+7	50	
9	Atlante	34	12	12	10	43	35	+8	48	
10	Coras	34	12	12	10	46	40	+6	48	
11	BUAP (C, P, Q)	34	12	9	13	45	52	−7	45	Advance to Promotion Final
12	U. de G.	34	9	13	12	39	44	−5	40	
13	Tapachula	34	10	7	17	41	53	−12	37	Eliminated from Copa MX Apertura 2017
14	UAT	34	9	9	16	36	47	−11	36	Eliminated from Copa MX Apertura 2017
15	Venados	34	8	11	15	37	68	−31	35	Eliminated from Copa MX Apertura 2017
16	Murciélagos	34	8	9	17	31	47	−16	33	Eliminated from Copa MX Apertura 2017
17	Tampico Madero	34	8	9	17	23	41	−18	33	Eliminated from Copa MX Apertura 2017
18	U. de C. (R)	34	7	7	20	38	61	−23	28	Team is last in relegation table

Updated to match(es) played on April 15, 2017. Source: AscensoMX.net
Rules for classification: 1) points; 2) goal difference; 3) number of goals scored.
(C) Champions; (P) Promoted; (Q) Qualified for the phase indicated; (R) Relegated

== Relegation table ==
Relegation to Liga Premier de Ascenso was reinstated this year to Ascenso MX. The relegated team will be the one with the lowest ratio of points to matches played in the following tournaments: Apertura 2014, Clausura 2015, Apertura 2015, Clausura 2016, Apertura 2016 and Clausura 2017.

Pos	Team	'14 A Pts	'15 C Pts	'15 A Pts	'16 C Pts	'16 A Pts	'17 C Pts	Total Pts	Total Pld	Avg	Relegation
1	Zacatecas	25	18	24	22	33	32	154	90	1.7111	Safe for 2017–18 Season
2	Sinaloa	0	0	0	0	27	31	58	34	1.7059	Safe for 2017–18 Season
3	UAEM	0	0	0	0	29	28	57	34	1.6765	Safe for 2017–18 Season
4	Juárez	0	0	29	20	22	28	99	64	1.5469	Safe for 2017–18 Season
5	Oaxaca	15	20	25	21	26	30	137	90	1.5222	Safe for 2017–18 Season
6	BUAP	20	22	29	18	18	27	134	90	1.4889	Safe for 2017–18 Season
7	Coras	27	18	20	19	22	26	132	90	1.4667	Safe for 2017–18 Season
8	Atlante	21	13	23	25	27	21	130	90	1.4444	Safe for 2017–18 Season
9	U. de G.	0	0	21	29	18	22	90	64	1.4062	Safe for 2017–18 Season
10	Tapachula	21	14	22	27	16	21	121	90	1.3444	Safe for 2017–18 Season
11	Celaya	6	10	20	26	35	19	116	90	1.2889	Safe for 2017–18 Season
12	UAT	24	20	13	22	20	16	115	90	1.2778	Safe for 2017–18 Season
13	Zacatepec	18	12	13	13	30	27	113	90	1.2556	Safe for 2017–18 Season
14	Sonora	0	0	8	10	27	27	72	64	1.1250	Safe for 2017–18 Season
15	Murciélagos	13	15	24	16	19	14	101	90	1.1222	Safe for 2017–18 Season
16	Venados	9	22	15	20	20	15	101	90	1.1222	Safe for 2017–18 Season
17	Tampico Madero	0	0	0	0	10	23	33	34	0.9706	Safe for 2017–18 Season
18	U. de C. (R)	0	0	0	0	14	14	28	34	0.8235	Relegated to Liga Premier de Ascenso

Last update: 15 April 2017
R = Relegated
