= 2014–15 Ascenso MX season =

Season of a Mexican football league

Ascenso MX
- Season: 2014–15
- Champions: Apertura: Necaxa (3rd Title); Clausura: Dorados (3rd Title)
- Promoted: Dorados de Sinaloa
- Relegated: No Relegation this season
- Matches: 178
- Goals: 443 (2.49 per match)
- Top goalscorer: Apertura: Diego Jimenez; Giancarlo Maldonado (10) Clausura: as of 4–10–15
- Biggest home win: Apertura: Atlético San Luis 4–0 Dorados (July 26, 2014) Clausura: Atlético San Luis 3–0 Atlante (February 21, 2015)
- Biggest away win: Apertura: Mérida 2–4 Atlante (August 16, 2014); Irapuato 2–4 Mineros de Zacatecas (August 29, 2014) Clausura: Atlante 0–3 Zacatepec Siglo XXI (March 13, 2015); Zacatepec Siglo XXI 0–3 Atlético San Luis (March 21, 2015)
- Highest scoring: Apertura: Necaxa 4–3 Celaya (July 19, 2014); Dorados 4–3 Zacatepec Siglo XXI (August 16, 2014) Clausura: Mérida 4–4 Irapuato (January 23, 2015)
- Longest winning run: Coras FC (4 – Apertura); Atlante (4 – Clausura)
- Longest unbeaten run: Coras FC (8 – Apertura); Necaxa (5 – Clausura)
- Longest winless run: Celaya (9 – Apertura; 8 – Clausura)
- Longest losing run: Celaya (5 – Apertura; 4 – Clausura)
- Highest attendance: Clausura: 8,324; Mérida 3–1 Atlético San Luis (February 13, 2015)
- Lowest attendance: Clausura: 1,256; Altamira 1–0 Zacatepec Siglo XXI (February 15, 2015)
- Average attendance: 32,869

The 2014–15 Ascenso MX season began July 18, 2014 and is divided into two tournaments named Apertura 2014 and Clausura 2015. The Ascenso MX is the second-tier football league of Mexico.

== Changes from the previous season ==
- U. de G. were promoted to Liga MX.
- Atlante F.C. were relegated from Liga MX.
- Zacatepec 1948 were relegated to Segunda División de México, but was able to purchase Cruz Azul Hidalgo's spot to remain in Ascenso MX and was rebranded Zacatepec Siglo XXI. Cruz Azul Hidalgo was dissolved.
- Coras F.C. was promoted from Segunda División de México.
- Estudiantes Tecos was moved to Zacatecas and rebranded to Mineros de Zacatecas by owner Grupo Pachuca.
- Ballenas Galeana was rebranded to Irapuato since they moved to Irapuato, Guanajuato.
- Delfines F.C. dissolved in May 2014.

== Stadia and locations ==
The following 14 clubs will compete in the Ascenso MX during the 2014-2015 season:

Location of teams in the 2014–15 Ascenso MX

Club	City	Stadium	Capacity
Altamira	Altamira	Estadio Altamira	9,581
San Luis	San Luis Potosí	Estadio Alfonso Lastras	25,111
Atlante	Cancún	Olímpico Andrés Quintana Roo	17,289
BUAP	Puebla	Estadio Olímpico de C.U.	19,283
Celaya	Celaya	Estadio Miguel Alemán	23,182
Coras	Tepic	Arena Cora	12,271
Irapuato	Irapuato	Estadio Sergio León Chávez	25,000
Mérida	Mérida	Estadio Carlos Iturralde	15,087
Necaxa	Aguascalientes	Estadio Victoria	23,851
Oaxaca	Oaxaca City	Estadio Benito Juárez	10,250
Sinaloa	Culiacán	Estadio Banorte	17,898
UAT	Ciudad Victoria	Estadio Marte R. Gómez	10,520
Zacatecas	Zacatecas	Estadio Francisco Villa	13,820
Zacatepec	Zacatepec	Estadio Agustín "Coruco" Díaz	24,313

=== Personnel and kits ===
Team	Head coach	Kit manufacturer	Sponsors
Altamira	(Mexico) Fernando Palomeque	Lotto	
Atl. San Luis	(Mexico) Raúl Arias	Charly	Boing!
Atlante	(Uruguay) Wilson Graniolatti	Kappa	Cancún
BUAP	(Argentina) Ricardo Valiño	Keuka	Coca-Cola
Celaya	(Mexico) Enrique López Zarza	Keuka	Bachoco
Coras	(Italy) Mauro Camoranesi	Romed	Riviera Nayarit
Irapuato	(Mexico) Jorge Manrique	Keuka	Grupo Rotoplas
Mérida	(Mexico) Juan Carlos Chávez	Foursport	ADO
Necaxa	(Mexico) Miguel de Jesús Fuentes	Umbro	Búfalo
Oaxaca	(Mexico) Ricardo Rayas	Lotto	
Sinaloa	(Argentina) Carlos Bustos	Silver	Coppel
UAT	(Mexico) Ricardo Cadena	Atletica	UAT
Zacatecas	(Argentina) Pablo Marini	Pirma	Telcel
Zacatepec	(Mexico) Joel Sánchez	Silver	Coca-Cola

== Managerial changes ==
Team	Outgoing manager	Manner of departure	Date of vacancy	Replaced by	Date of appointment	Position in table
Apertura Changes
Correcaminos	(Mexico) Omar Arellano Nuño	Sacked	August 30, 2014	(Ecuador) Álex Aguinaga	September 1, 2014	8th
Celaya	(Mexico) Jorge Humberto Torres	Sacked	August 31, 2014	(Mexico) Nicolás Trejo (Interim)	August 31, 2014	14th
Dorados	(Mexico) Diego Torres Ortíz	Sacked	August 31, 2014	(Mexico) Eduardo Fentanes	September 5, 2014	12th
Celaya	(Mexico) Nicolás Trejo (Interim)	End of tenure as caretaker	September 21, 2014	(Brazil) Zico	September 25, 2014	14th
Pre-Clausura changes
Dorados	(Mexico) Eduardo Fentanes	Resigned	November 11, 2014	(Argentina) Carlos Bustos	November 11, 2014	Preseason
Atletico San Luis	(Mexico) Flavio Davino	Resigned	November 26, 2014	(Mexico) Raúl Arias	November 26, 2014	Preseason
Tepic	(Mexico) Joel Sánchez	Resigned	December 9, 2014	(Italy) Mauro Camoranesi	December 15, 2014	Preseason
Clausura changes
Altamira	(Mexico) Sergio Orduña	Sacked	February 10, 2015	(Mexico) Claudio Vázquez (Interim)	February 10. 2015	14th
Altamira	(Mexico) Claudio Vázquez (Interim)	End of tenure as caretaker	February 12, 2015	(Mexico) Fernando Palomeque	February 12. 2015	14th
Irapuato	(Mexico) Roberto Sandoval	Sacked	February 10, 2015	(Mexico) Jorge Manrique (Interim)	February 12. 2015	13th
Correcaminos	(Ecuador) Álex Aguinaga	Sacked	February 15, 2015	(Mexico) Ricardo Cadena (Interim)	February 15. 2015	10th
Zacatepec Siglo XXI	(Mexico) Ignacio Rodríguez	Sacked	February 22, 2015	(Mexico) Joel Sánchez	February 23, 2015	13th
Atlante	(Argentina) Gabriel Pereyra	Sacked	March 8, 2015	(Uruguay) Wilson Graniolatti	March 9, 2015	7th

== Apertura 2014 ==
The 2014 Apertura will be the first championship of the season. It began on July 18, 2014.

=== Standings ===
Pos	Team	Pld	W	D	L	GF	GA	GD	Pts	Qualification
1	Coras (Q)	13	8	3	2	19	11	+8	27	Qualification for Liguilla semifinals
2	Zacatecas (Q)	13	7	4	2	17	11	+6	25	Qualification for Liguilla quarterfinals
3	UAT (Q)	13	7	3	3	15	11	+4	24	Qualification for Liguilla quarterfinals
4	Necaxa (C, Q)	13	6	3	4	17	13	+4	21	Qualification for Liguilla quarterfinals
5	Atlante (Q)	13	5	6	2	20	17	+3	21	Qualification for Liguilla quarterfinals
6	Altamira (Q)	13	7	0	6	15	13	+2	21	Qualification for Liguilla quarterfinals
7	BUAP (Q)	13	6	2	5	19	13	+6	20	Qualification for Liguilla quarterfinals
8	Zacatepec	13	5	3	5	16	14	+2	18	
9	San Luis	13	5	2	6	17	13	+4	17	
10	Oaxaca	13	3	6	4	19	21	−2	15	
11	Sinaloa	13	3	5	5	15	22	−7	14	
12	Irapuato	13	3	3	7	9	18	−9	12	
13	Mérida	13	2	3	8	17	24	−7	9	
14	Celaya (E)	13	1	3	9	12	25	−13	6	Eliminated from Copa MX Clausura 2015

Updated to match(es) played on October 25, 2014. Source: Medio Tiempo
Rules for classification: 1) points; 2) goal difference; 3) number of goals scored.
(C) Champions; (E) Eliminated; (Q) Qualified for the phase indicated

=== Results ===
Home \ Away	ALT	ATE	ATL	BUP	CEL	COR	IRA	MER	NEC	OAX	SIN	UAT	ZAS	ZAC
Altamira			1–0	0–2				3–0		2–1		1–0	3–1	
Atlante	2–1		1–1	1–0		1–2	2–1					2–1	1–1	
Atlético San Luis					4–1	1–3		2–1	0–1	2–0	4–0			1–0
BUAP			2–1					3–1		1–2	3–0	2–3	0–1	
Celaya	2–0	2–2		0–2		1–3	0–1					0–1	0–1	
Coras	1–0			0–0					2–1		1–2	2–1	0–1	1–0
Irapuato	0–1		0–0	2–2		0–0		1–0				0–1	2–4	
Mérida		2–4			3–0	2–3			2–2	4–2	1–1			0–1
Necaxa	1–2	0–0		1–0	4–3		3–0							2–0
Oaxaca		4–2			1–1	1–1	2–1		1–1		2–2			1–1
Sinaloa	1–0	1–1			2–2		0–1		0–1					4–3
UAT			1–0					2–1	1–0	1–0	2–2		0–0	
Zacatecas			2–1					0–0	2–0	2–2	1–0			1–2
Zacatepec	2–1	1–1		1–2	1–0		3–0					1–1		

Updated to match(es) played on 25 October 2014. Source:
Legend: Blue = home team win; Yellow = draw; Red = away team win.

=== Liguilla (Playoffs) ===
The six best teams after the first place play two games against each other on a home-and-away basis. The winner of each match up is determined by aggregate score. If the teams are tied, the Away goals rule applies.

The teams were seeded one to seven in quarterfinals, and will be re-seeded one to four in semifinals, depending on their position in the general table. The higher seeded teams play on their home field during the second leg.

Quarterfinals
3	UAT	0	1	1
6	Altamira	0	2	2
2	Zacatecas	2	1	3
7	BUAP	1	1	2
4	Necaxa	1	2	3
5	Atlante	2	0	2

Semifinals
1	Tepic	2	1	3
6	Altamira	1	1	2
2	Zacatecas	0	2	2
4	Necaxa (a)	1	1	2

Finals
1	Tepic	0	4	4(4)
4	Necaxa	0	4	4(5)

- If the two teams are tied after both legs, the away goals rule applies. If both teams still tied, higher seeded team advances.
- Teams are re-seeded every round.
- The winner will qualify to the playoff match vs (Clausura 2015 Champions) . However, if the winner is the same in both tournaments, they would be the team promoted to the 2015–16 Mexican Primera División season without playing the Promotional Final

==== Quarterfinals ====
Team 1	Agg.	Team 2	1st leg	2nd leg
Zacatecas (2)	3 – 2	(7) BUAP	2 – 1	1 – 1
UAT (3)	1 – 2	(6) Altamira	0 – 0	1 – 2
Necaxa (4)	3 – 2	(5) Atlante	1 – 2	2 – 0

===== First leg =====
1 November 2014	BUAP	1–2	Zacatecas	Puebla
12:00	M. Piñón 83'	Report	G. Ramírez 33'; R. Íñigo 41'	Stadium: Estadio Universitario BUAP; Attendance: 7,831; Referee: Diego Montaño Robles

1 November 2014	Atlante	2–1	Necaxa	Cancún
19:00	N. Mina 71'; R. Salinas 83'	Report	C. Hurtado 57'	Stadium: Estadio Andrés Quintana Roo; Attendance: 4,822; Referee: Jonathan Hernández Juárez

2 November 2014	Altamira	0–0	UAT	Altamira
18:00		Report		Stadium: Estadio Altamira; Attendance: 6,503; Referee: Ángel Monroy Bello

===== Second leg =====
7 November 2014	Zacatecas	1–1 (3–2 agg.)	BUAP	Zacatecas
19:30	N. Maya 60'	Report	M. Piñón 83'	Stadium: Estadio Francisco Villa; Attendance: 13,666; Referee: Quetzalli Alvarado Godínez

8 November 2014	Necaxa	2–0 (3–2 agg.)	Atlante	Aguascalientes
18:00	V. Lojero 59', 72'	Report		Stadium: Estadio Victoria; Attendance: 9,713; Referee: Marco Antonio Ortíz Nava

8 November 2014	UAT	1–2 (1–2 agg.)	Altamira	Ciudad Victoria
20:00	S. Rosas 87'	Report	C. Nava 81'; E. Dos Santos 90+2'	Stadium: Estadio Marte R. Gómez; Attendance: 8,834; Referee: Fernando Hernández Gómez

==== Semifinals ====
Team 1	Agg.	Team 2	1st leg	2nd leg
Tepic (1)	3 – 2	(6) Altamira	2 – 1	1 – 1
Zacatecas (2)	2 – 2 (a)	(4) Necaxa	0 – 1	2 – 1

===== First leg =====
15 November 2014	Necaxa	1–0	Zacatecas	Aguascalientes
18:00	C. Ramos 24'	Report		Stadium: Estadio Victoria; Attendance: 19,124; Referee: Ángel Monroy Bello

16 November 2014	Altamira	1–2	Tepic	Altamira
17:00	V. Aquino 47'	Report	E. Pacheco 52'; A. Coronado 69'	Stadium: Estadio Altamira; Attendance: 9,121; Referee: Diego Montaño Robles

===== Second leg =====
21 November 2014	Zacatecas	2–1 (2–2 agg.)	Necaxa	Zacatecas
19:30	N. Maya 9'; J. Cuevas 11'	Report	F. Gallegos 82'	Stadium: Estadio Francisco Villa; Attendance: 13,935; Referee: Fernando Hernández Gómez

22 November 2014	Tepic	1–1 (3–2 agg.)	Altamira	Tepic
18:00	M. Pérez 42'	Report	V. Aquino 30'	Stadium: Arena Cora; Attendance: 9,981; Referee: Marco Antonio Ortíz Nava

==== Final ====
Team 1	Agg.	Team 2	1st leg	2nd leg
Tepic (1)	4(4) – 4(5)	(4) Necaxa	0 – 0	4 – 4

===== First leg =====
29 November 2014	Necaxa	0–0	Tepic	Aguascalientes
18:00		Report		Stadium: Estadio Victoria; Attendance: 20,826; Referee: Fernando Hernández Gómez

===== Second leg =====
6 December 2014	Tepic	4–4 (4–4 agg.) (4–5 p)	Necaxa	Tepic
18:00	R. López 35'; A. Bautista 39'; D. Hernández 68'; J. Mora 120'	Report	L. Padilla 30'; J. Goncalves 77'; V. Lojero 83', 110'	Stadium: Arena Cora; Attendance: 11,729; Referee: Marco Antonio Ortíz Nava

Apertura 2014 winner:

3rd title

== Clausura 2015 ==
=== Standings ===
Pos	Team	Pld	W	D	L	GF	GA	GD	Pts	Qualification
1	San Luis (Q)	13	8	0	5	20	10	+10	24	Qualification for Liguilla semifinals
2	Sinaloa (Q)	13	7	2	4	23	15	+8	23	Qualification for Liguilla quarterfinals
3	BUAP (Q)	13	5	7	1	20	11	+9	22	Qualification for Liguilla quarterfinals
4	Mérida (Q)	13	6	4	3	21	16	+5	22	Qualification for Liguilla quarterfinals
5	Necaxa (Q)	13	6	3	4	15	14	+1	21	Qualification for Liguilla quarterfinals
6	UAT (Q)	13	6	2	5	18	15	+3	20	Qualification for Liguilla quarterfinals
7	Oaxaca (Q)	13	6	2	5	18	16	+2	20	Qualification for Liguilla quarterfinals
8	Tepic	13	5	3	5	16	19	−3	18	
9	Zacatecas	13	5	3	5	15	19	−4	18	
10	Irapuato	13	4	4	5	12	16	−4	16	
11	Altamira	13	4	2	7	11	18	−7	14	
12	Atlante	13	4	1	8	12	19	−7	13	
13	Zacatepec	13	3	3	7	10	13	−3	12	
14	Celaya	13	2	4	7	14	25	−11	10	

Updated to match(es) played on April 11, 2015. Source: Medio Tiempo
Rules for classification: 1) points; 2) goal difference; 3) number of goals scored.
(Q) Qualified for the phase indicated

=== Results ===
Home \ Away	ALT	ATE	ATL	BUP	CEL	COR	IRA	MER	NEC	OAX	SIN	UAT	ZAS	ZAC
Altamira		0–1			2–1	0–1	1–1		2–0		2–1			1–0
Atlante					3–3			0–1	0–1	2–0	2–0			0–3
Atlético San Luis	3–1	3–0		1–0			1–0					0–1	4–0	
BUAP	1–1	2–0			3–0	2–2	2–0		4–2					0–0
Celaya			1–0					1–1	1–3	1–1	1–4			3–1
Coras		2–1	1–2		3–1		2–1	3–2		0–3				
Irapuato		0–2			1–0				1–0	3–1	0–0			1–0
Mérida	2–0		2–1	2–2			4–4					2–1	3–0	
Necaxa			0–1			0–0		0–0		2–1	2–1	2–1	1–1	
Oaxaca	3–1		1–0	1–1				2–0				2–1	1–3	
Sinaloa			3–1	1–1		3–1		2–1		2–1		3–1	3–0	
UAT	2–0	2–1		0–1	1–1	1–0	3–0							0–0
Zacatecas	2–0	2–0		1–1	2–0	2–0	0–0					3–4		
Zacatepec			0–3			1–1		0–1	1–2	0–1	2–0		2–0	

Updated to match(es) played on 11 April 2015. Source:
Legend: Blue = home team win; Yellow = draw; Red = away team win.

=== Liguilla (Playoffs) ===
The six best teams after the first place play two games against each other on a home-and-away basis. The winner of each match up is determined by aggregate score. If the teams are tied, the Away goals rule applies.

The teams were seeded one to seven in quarterfinals, and will be re-seeded one to four in semifinals, depending on their position in the general table. The higher seeded teams play on their home field during the second leg.

Quarterfinals
3	BUAP	2	0	2
6	UAT	1	2	3
2	Sinaloa	0	3	3
7	Oaxaca	0	1	1
4	Mérida	1	1	2
5	Necaxa	1	3	4

Semifinals
1	San Luis	0	2	2
6	UAT	2	0	2
2	Sinaloa	2	2	4
5	Necaxa	1	1	2

Finals
1	San Luis	0	1	1
2	Sinaloa	3	0	3

- If the two teams are tied after both legs, the away goals rule applies. If both teams still tied, higher seeded team advances.
- Teams are re-seeded every round.
- The winner will qualify to the playoff match vs (Necaxa). The winner will be promoted to the 2015–16 Mexican Primera División season

==== Quarterfinals ====
Team 1	Agg.	Team 2	1st leg	2nd leg
Sinaloa (2)	3 – 1	(7) Oaxaca	0 - 0	3 - 1
BUAP (3)	2 – 3	(6) UAT	2 - 1	0 - 2
Mérida (4)	2 – 4	(5) Necaxa	1 - 1	1 - 3

===== First leg =====
15 April 2015	Necaxa	1–1	Mérida	Aguascalientes
19:30	L. Padilla 46'	Report	R. Suárez 38'	Stadium: Estadio Victoria; Attendance: 6,669; Referee: Diego Montaño Robles

16 April 2015	Oaxaca	0–0	Sinaloa	Oaxaca
19:00		Report		Stadium: Estadio Benito Juárez; Attendance: 9,850; Referee: Adonai Escobedo González

16 April 2015	UAT	1–2	BUAP	Ciudad Victoria
21:00	J. Orozco 56'	Report	H. Morales 47'; C. Martínez 66'	Stadium: Estadio Marte R. Gómez; Attendance: 5,472; Referee: Jonathan Hernández Juárez

===== Second leg =====
18 April 2015	Mérida	1–3 (2–4 agg.)	Necaxa	Mérida
19:00	A. Polo 45'	Report	R. Rojas 32', 76'; V. Lojero 38'	Stadium: Estadio Carlos Iturralde; Attendance: 14,039; Referee: Marco Antonio Ortíz Nava

19 April 2015	BUAP	0–2 (2–3 agg.)	UAT	Puebla
17:00		Report	A. Alvarado 8'; J. Gonçalves 26'	Stadium: Estadio Universitario BUAP; Attendance: 8,207; Referee: Ángel Monroy Bello

19 April 2015	Sinaloa	3–1 (3–1 agg.)	Oaxaca	Culiacán
19:00	R. Nurse 7', 9', 72'	Report	D. Santoya 51'	Stadium: Estadio Banorte; Attendance: 16 333; Referee: Fernando Hernández Gómez

==== Semifinals ====
Team 1	Agg.	Team 2	1st leg	2nd leg
San Luis (1)	2 – 2	(6) UAT	0 - 2	2 - 0
Sinaloa (2)	4 – 2	(5) Necaxa	2 - 1	2 - 1

===== First leg =====
22 April 2015	UAT	2–0	San Luis	Ciudad Victoria
21:00	A. Berber 67'; R. Saucedo 85'	Report		Stadium: Estadio Marte R. Gómez; Attendance: 10,162; Referee: Adonai Escobedo González

23 April 2015	Necaxa	1–2	Sinaloa	Aguascalientes
20:30	L. Gorocito 84'		R. Prieto 26', 28'	Stadium: Estadio Victoria; Attendance: 12,339; Referee: Ángel Monroy Bello

===== Second leg =====
25 April 2015	San Luis	2–0 (2–2 agg.)	UAT	San Luis Potosí
19:00	L. Carrijó 8'; O. Pineda 68'	Report		Stadium: Estadio Alfonso Lastras; Attendance: 18,835; Referee: Fernando Hernández Gómez

26 April 2015	Sinaloa	2–1 (4–2 agg.)	Necaxa	Culiacán
19:00	R. Nurse 85'; V. Angulo 90'	Report	J. Isijara 18'	Stadium: Estadio Banorte; Attendance: 18,333; Referee: Marco Antonio Ortíz Nava

==== Final ====
Team 1	Agg.	Team 2	1st leg	2nd leg
San Luis (1)	1 – 3	(2) Sinaloa	0 - 3	1 - 0

===== First leg =====
2 May 2015	Sinaloa	3–0	San Luis	Culiacán
19:00	R. Enríquez 45'; D. Mejía 53'; R. Prieto 74'	Report		Stadium: Estadio Banorte; Attendance: 18,106; Referee: Marco Antonio Ortíz Nava

===== Second leg =====
9 May 2015	San Luis	1–0 (1–3 agg.)	Sinaloa	San Luis Potosí
19:00	É. González 62'	Report		Stadium: Estadio Alfonso Lastras; Attendance: 24,109; Referee: Fernando Hernández Gómez

Clausura 2015 winner:

3rd title

== Campeón de Ascenso 2015 ==
=== First leg ===
May 16, 2015
20:00 (Central), 19:00 (Local)

Sinaloa	1–1	Necaxa
Raúl Enríquez 41'	Report	Roger Rojas 55'

Estadio Banorte
Culiacan

=== Second leg ===
May 23, 2015
17:00

Necaxa	0–2	Sinaloa
	Report	Raúl Enríquez 76', 81'

Estadio Victoria
Aguascalientes

Champions

2nd title

== Aggregate table ==
Pos	Team	Pld	W	D	L	GF	GA	GD	Pts	Qualification
1	Tepic	26	13	6	7	35	30	+5	45	
2	UAT	26	13	5	8	33	26	+7	44	
3	Zacatecas	26	12	7	7	32	30	+2	43	
4	BUAP	26	11	9	6	39	24	+15	42	
5	Necaxa (Q)	26	12	6	8	32	27	+5	42	Final de Ascenso
6	San Luis	26	13	2	11	36	22	+14	41	
7	Sinaloa (P, Q)	26	10	7	9	38	37	+1	37	Final de Ascenso
8	Oaxaca	26	9	8	9	37	37	0	35	
9	Altamira	26	11	2	13	26	31	−5	35	
10	Atlante	26	9	7	10	32	36	−4	34	
11	Mérida	26	8	7	11	37	39	−2	31	
12	Zacatepec	26	8	6	12	26	28	−2	30	
13	Irapuato	26	7	7	12	21	34	−13	28	
14	Celaya	26	3	7	16	26	50	−24	16	

Updated to match(es) played on April 11, 2015. Source: Medio Tiempo
Rules for classification: 1) points; 2) goal difference; 3) number of goals scored.
(P) Promoted; (Q) Qualified for the phase indicated

== Relegation table ==
The relegated team would normally the team with the lowest ratio by summing the points scored in the following tournaments: Apertura 2012, Clausura 2013, Apertura 2013, Clausura 2014, Apertura 2014 and Clausura 2015. However, no team will be relegated to Second Division this season.

Pos	Team	Total Pts	Total Pld	Avg
10	Atlante	34	26	1.3077
11	Altamira	97	82	1.183
12	Zacatepec	94	82	1.1434
13	Irapuato	56	54	1.037
14	Celaya	80	82	0.9756
