= List of FC Juárez seasons =

Fútbol Club Juárez is a football club based in Ciudad Juárez, Chihuahua, Mexico founded in 2015.

The club purchased the Liga MX franchise of Lobos BUAP in 2019 and did not inherit their records or statistics, only matches counted towards the relegation coefficient.

As of the end of the Clausura 2023 season, the club's first team had spent eight seasons in the first tier of Mexican football and eight seasons in the second tier. The table details their achievements in first-team competitions, and records their top goalscorer for each completed season.

== Key ==
Key to league:

- Pos. = Final position
- Pl. = Played
- W = Games won
- D = Games drawn
- L = Games lost
- GF = Goals scored
- GA = Goals against
- Pts = Points

Key to rounds:

- C = Champion
- F = Final (Runner-up)
- SF = Semi-finals
- QF = Quarter-finals
- R16/R32 = Round of 16, round of 32, etc.
- RE = Playoff round for liguilla
- GS = Group stage
- W/O = Withdrawn from competition

Champions	Runners-up

Top scorers shown in italics with number of goals scored in bold are players who were also top scorers in the Liga MX that season.

== Seasons ==
Season	League									Liguilla	Copa MX	International		Other competitions		League Top scorer (Note: Only includes goals scored in the regular season.)	
Season	Division	Pos. (Note: Position listed is general league rank.)	Pl.	W	D	L	GF	GA	Pts	Liguilla	Copa MX	International		Other competitions		Name(s)	Goals
Apertura 2015	Ascenso MX	2nd	15	8	5	2	24	14	29	**C**	DNP			Promotion Final	F	(Brazil) Leandro Carrijó	10
Clausura 2016	Ascenso MX	10th	15	5	5	5	13	12	20		QF			Promotion Final	F	(Brazil) Leandro Carrijó	7
Apertura 2016	Ascenso MX	10th	17	6	4	7	18	17	22		R16					(Brazil) Leandro Carrijó	7
Clausura 2017	Ascenso MX	4th	17	8	4	5	23	17	28	F	QF					(Brazil) Leandro Carrijó	7
Apertura 2017	Ascenso MX	2nd	15	7	5	3	19	16	26	F	GS					(Brazil) Leandro Carrijó	5
Clausura 2018	Ascenso MX	13th	15	3	6	6	12	16	15		GS					(Brazil) Leandro Carrijó	5
Apertura 2018	Ascenso MX	1st	14	11	2	1	26	10	35	SF	QF					(Brazil) Leandro Carrijó (Argentina) Gabriel Hachen	6
Clausura 2019	Ascenso MX	14th	14	3	2	9	16	26	11		F					(Brazil) Leandro Carrijó	4
Apertura 2019	Liga MX	16th	18	5	3	10	17	27	18		SF					(Paraguay) Dario Lezcano	6
Clausura 2020 (Note: The Clausura 2020 season was ended early due to the coronavirus pandemic.)	Liga MX	8th	10	4	2	4	20	18	14	Not held	SF					(Paraguay) Dario Lezcano	6
Guardianes 2020	Liga MX	13th	17	4	7	6	16	19	19		Not held					(Paraguay) Dario Lezcano	10
Guardianes 2021	Liga MX	16th	17	4	3	10	13	29	15		Not held					(Paraguay) Dario Lezcano	5
Apertura 2021	Liga MX	16th	17	4	4	9	14	25	16		Not held					(Uruguay) Gabriel Fernández	3
Clausura 2022	Liga MX	18th	17	3	2	12	10	28	11		Not held					(Mexico) Fernando Arce Jr.	4
Apertura 2022	Liga MX	11th	17	4	7	6	17	28	19	RE	Not held					(Uruguay) Gabriel Fernández	6
Clausura 2023	Liga MX	16th	17	3	6	8	17	25	15		Not held					(Argentina) Tomás Molina	4
Apertura 2023	Liga MX	TBD									Not held	Leagues Cup	TBD				
Total			252	82	67	103	275	327	313								
