= Basulto =

Basulto is a surname. It is a Castilianized version of the Basque surname Basurto. Notable people with the surname include:

- Diego Hernández Basulto (born 1993), Mexican footballer
- José Basulto (born 1940), Cuban exile and civic leader
- Miguel Basulto (born 1992), Mexican footballer
