= Garcés =

Garcés is a Spanish surname. Notable people with the surname include:

- Ana Garcés (born 2000), Spanish actress
- Carlos Antonio Bernardo Garcés (1900-1980), Mexican athlete
- Carlos Garcés (born 1990), Ecuadorian football player
- Delia Garcés (1919–2001), Argentine film actress
- Francisco Garcés (1738–1781), Spanish Franciscan missionary
- Frank Garcés (born 1990), professional baseball player
- Galindo Garcés (died 844), a Count of Aragon from 833 until his death in 844
- Gloria Galeano Garcés (1958–2016), Colombian botanist and agronomist
- Jorge Garcés, (born 1954), Chilean football manager
- José Luis Garcés (born 1981), Panamanian football forward
- Mauricio Garcés (1926–1989), Mexican actor
- Padre Francisco Garcés (1738–1781), Spanish Franciscan missionary
- Paula Garcés (born 1974), film and television actress
- Paulo Garcés (born 1984), Chilean football goalkeeper
- Ramón José Sender Garcés (1901–1982), Aragonese Spanish novelist, essayist and journalist
- Ramiro Garcés, Lord of Calahorra (died 1083), the second son of king García Sánchez III of Navarre and queen Stephania
- Ramiro Garcés of Viguera (dead by 991) was the King of Viguera from 970 to his death
- Rich Garcés (born 1971), former right-handed relief pitcher in Major League Baseball
- Rubén Garcés (born 1973), Panamanian professional basketball player
- Sans IV Gassia of Gascony (died 950 or 955), Duke of Gascony from 930 to his death
- Tomàs Garcés (1901–1993), Catalan poet and lawyer
- William Garcés of Fézensac (died 960), the first Count of Fézensac

== See also ==
- Jérôme Garcès (born 1973), French rugby referee
