= Carlos Garces (athlete) =

Mexican sprinter (1900–1980)

Carlos Garcés
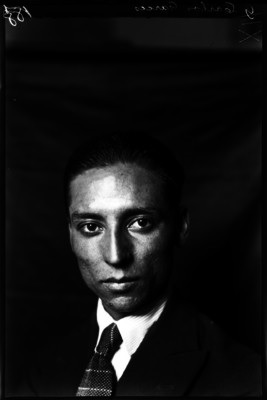
- Garcés López in 1922

Personal information
- Full name: Carlos Antonio Bernardo Garcés López
- Born: 25 December 1900 San Luis de la Paz, Guanajuato, Mexico
- Died: 21 September 1980 (aged 79) Churubusco, Mexico City, Mexico
Association football career
- Position: Midfielder
Senior career*
Years	Team	Apps	(Gls)
1916-1928	Club América		
1927-?	Cruz Azul		
International career
1923	Mexico	6	(2)
1928	Mexico Olympic	2	(0)
- * Club domestic league appearances and goals

Sport
- Sport: Sprinting
- Event: 200 metres

Carlos Antonio Bernardo Garcés López (Note: In this Mexican name, the surname is Garcés and the second or maternal family name is López.) (25 December 1900 – 21 September 1980) was a Mexican sprinter, footballer, and dental surgeon. Garcés is recognized as one of the founding members of Club América as well as one of the first players to officially represent the Mexico national football team. Garcés is also credited as the founder of the football club Cruz Azul. During his employment at Cooperativa La Cruz Azul in the late 1920s, Garcés personally lobbied for the establishment of a company football team of which he also managed. Ironically the club would become fierce rivals with América decades later. Garcés is also credited for the creation of the siquitibum chant.

As an Olympian, Garcés competed in the men's 200 metres at the 1924 Summer Olympics. He also competed in the men's football tournament at the 1928 Summer Olympics.

== Club career ==
=== America ===
Carlos Garcés was one of the founding members of Club América in 1916. From its inception until 1928, he played as a midfielder for the club winning multiple titles in the Primera Fuerza.

=== Cruz Azul ===
As football in Mexico was not a lucrative occupation, Garcés López, a licensed dentist, found employment at the cement company Cooperativa La Cruz Azul located in the small town of Jasso, Hidalgo, providing dental care to its employees. He would travel regularly to Mexico City from Jasso to train and play for América.

In 1925, Cooperativa La Cruz Azul had voted to establish a company baseball team as the sport was popular in the town of Jasso. Garcés López, however, personally lobbied for many months to change the official company sport to football. Initially receiving resistance from American employees, Garcés López eventually convinced the company directors to hold a referendum in which the workers would vote on the company team's main sport. On 22 March 1927, the vote was held where it was decided the company team's sport was to change from baseball to football. Cooperativa La Cruz Azul installed a football pitch on the company's premises in place of the baseball field and the football team was officially established on two months later on 22 May where Garcés López was appointed head coach of the newly founded team.

== International career ==
Garcés López formed part of the first Mexico national team in 1923. Garcés López played in Mexico's first series of official international matches against Guatemala.

Mexico did not form another national team until the 1928 Summer Olympics where Garcés López was once again called up. Garcés López played against Spain and Chile where Mexico lost both matches 7–1 and 3–1 respectively.

== Later career ==
From 1937 to 1942 Garcés López was president of the Mexican Football Federation.

== Career statistics ==
No.	Date	Venue	Opponent	Score	Result	Competition
1.	12 December 1923	Parque España, Mexico City, Mexico	Guatemala	2–0	2-0	Friendly
2.	16 December 1923	Parque España, Mexico City, Mexico	Guatemala	2–1	3-3	Friendly
