= Diego Jiménez (footballer, born 1988) =

Mexican footballer

Personal information
- Full name: Diego Rafael Jiménez Hernández
- Date of birth: 18 September 1988 (age 38)
- Place of birth: Guadalajara, Jalisco, Mexico
- Height: 1.76 m (5 ft 9 in)
- Position: Forward

Youth career
- 2007–2008: Cruz Azul Jasso

Senior career*
Years	Team	Apps	(Gls)
2008–2010	Cruz Azul Hidalgo	54	(13)
2009–2010	Cruz Azul	2	(0)
2011–2012	Merida	44	(12)
2013	Atlante	14	(1)
2014–2018	Lobos BUAP	137	(50)
2019	Tampico Madero	12	(3)
2019–2020	Alebrijes de Oaxaca	24	(8)
2020	Atlético Veracruz	0	(0)
2021	Atlético Morelia	19	(9)
2021–2022	Celaya	39	(11)
2022–2024	Sonora	61	(25)
- * Club domestic league appearances and goals as of 18 October 2022

Diego Rafael Jiménez Hernández (Note: In this Spanish name, the first or paternal surname is Jiménez and the second or maternal family name is Hernández.) (born 18 September 1988) is a Mexican professional footballer who plays as a forward.

== Club career ==
=== Cruz Azul ===
Jiménez made his professional debut on 13 January 2008, for Cruz Azul Hidalgo against Jaguares de Chiapas in Ascenso MX. His debut in Liga MX was on 28 February 2009, for Cruz Azul against Atlante.

== Honours ==
Lobos BUAP

- Ascenso MX: Clausura 2017
- Campeón de Ascenso: 2016-17

Individual

- Liga de Expansión MX Golden Boot: Apertura 2022
