= Valentín Arredondo =

Mexican footballer (born 1989)

Personal information
- Full name: Valentín Arredondo Castro
- Date of birth: 13 February 1989 (age 37)
- Place of birth: Ahome, Sinaloa, Mexico
- Height: 1.76 m (5 ft 9 in)
- Position: Defender

Senior career*
Years	Team	Apps	(Gls)
2007	Atlas Premier	6	(0)
2008–2010	Dorados Los Mochis	62	(8)
2011–2012	Deportivo Guamúchil	39	(2)
2012–2014	Murciélagos	42	(4)
2014–2015	Irapuato	8	(0)
2015–2017	Murciélagos	49	(3)

Managerial career
- 2018–2019: Murciélagos (Assistant)
- 2019–2020: Murciélagos
- 2020–2022: Sonora Premier (Assistant)
- 2022–2023: Sonora (Liga TDP)
- 2023–2024: Sonora (Assistant)
- 2024–2026: Sonora
- * Club domestic league appearances and goals

Valentín Arredondo (born February 13, 1989) is a retired Mexican professional footballer who played for Murciélagos of Ascenso MX.
