= Lucero Álvarez =

Uruguayan footballer (born 1985)

Personal information
- Full name: Lucero Gonzalo Álvarez Martínez
- Date of birth: 24 February 1985 (age 41)
- Place of birth: Montevideo, Uruguay
- Height: 1.83 m (6 ft 0 in)
- Position: Goalkeeper

Team information
- Current team: Club Oriental

Senior career*
Years	Team	Apps	(Gls)
2005	Nacional	1	(0)
2006	Vélez Sársfield	0	(0)
2006–2007	Nacional	0	(0)
2008	Juventud	5	(0)
2008–2009	Villa Española	14	(0)
2009–2012	Rampla Juniors	82	(0)
2012	Sud América	10	(0)
2013–2014	Deportivo Pasto	67	(0)
2014–2017	Alebrijes de Oaxaca	83	(4)
2017–2018	Lobos BUAP	12	(0)
2018	Rionegro Águilas	12	(0)
2019	Atlético Venezuela	9	(0)
2020	Dorados de Sinaloa	6	(0)
2020	Miramar Misiones	0	(0)
2021	Racing de Montevideo	21	(0)
2022	Cerro Largo	31	(0)
2023	Progreso	32	(0)
2024	Miramar Misiones	18	(0)
2025	Rampla Juniors	22	(0)
2026–	Club Oriental	0	(0)
- * Club domestic league appearances and goals as of 12 March 2026

Lucero Gonzalo Álvarez Martínez (born 24 February 1985 in Montevideo, Uruguay) is an Uruguayan footballer playing as goalkeeper for Uruguayan Segunda División club Club Oriental.

== Career ==
In the summer 2020, Álvarez moved to Miramar Misiones.

== Teams ==
- Nacional 2005
- Vélez Sársfield 2006
- Nacional 2006-2007
- Juventud Las Piedras 2008
- Villa Española 2008-2009
- Rampla Juniors 2009-2012
- Sud América 2012
- Deportivo Pasto 2013
- Alebrijes de Oaxaca 2014-2017
- Lobos BUAP 2017-
