= Fernando Palomeque =

Mexican footballer (born 1968)

Fernando Palomeque Díaz (born March 20, 1968, in Mexico City) is a former Mexican football player and current manager of Herediano.
