= Miguel Acosta (footballer, born 1975) =

Mexican footballer and manager

Personal information
- Full name: Miguel Acosta Moreno
- Date of birth: 4 September 1975 (age 51)
- Place of birth: Mexico City, Mexico
- Height: 1.76 m (5 ft 9 1/2 in)
- Position: Midfielder

Senior career*
Years	Team	Apps	(Gls)
1997–1999	Guadalajara	1	(0)
1999–2005	Necaxa	156	(9)
2005–2007	Tiburones Rojos	46	(2)
2007–2008	Necaxa	22	(1)

Managerial career
- 2014–2015: Estudiantes de Altamira (Assistant)
- 2015–2017: Necaxa Reserves and Academy
- 2017–2018: Necaxa (Women)
- * Club domestic league appearances and goals

Miguel Acosta Moreno (born September 4, 1975, in Mexico City), known as Miguel Acosta, is a Mexican football manager and former player. He was part of Necaxa's squad that finished third in the 2000 FIFA Club World Championship.

== Career ==
He made his debut with Club Deportivo Guadalajara in Winter 1997, but it was not until Winter 1999 when he moved to Club Necaxa that he began to have more participation. With hard work and good soccer he has been consolidating as an important part of the red and white team's system.

For the 2005 Apertura he moved to Veracruz, where he consolidated his position as an important player, both in the center and as a winger when the team needed him.

For the 2007 Apertura he returns to Club Necaxa where he retires.
