= Roberto Castro (footballer) =

Mexican footballer and manager (born 1980)

Personal information
- Full name: Roberto Carlos Castro Mora
- Date of birth: 7 March 1980 (age 46)
- Place of birth: León, Guanajuato, Mexico
- Height: 1.80 m (5 ft 11 in)
- Position: Goalkeeper

Team information
- Current team: Catedráticos Elite (Assistant)

Youth career
- 2001–2002: Bachilleres
- 2002: Cihuatlán

Senior career*
Years	Team	Apps	(Gls)
2002–2007	Atlas	5	(0)
2005–2006	→ Coyotes de Sonora (loan)	22	(0)
2006–2007	→ Académicos (loan)	17	(0)

Managerial career
- 2010–2016: Murciélagos (Assistant)
- 2021–2022: River Plate Escuela Jalisco
- 2022–: Catedráticos Elite (assistant)
- * Club domestic league appearances and goals

Roberto Carlos Castro Mora (born 7 March 1980), known as Roberto Castro, is a Mexican football manager and former player.
