= Siquitibum =

Mexican chant

The Chiquitibum (a.k.a. Alabio Alabao) is the most famous chant in Mexico used to congratulate a person. It is also called out after "Las Mañanitas", a traditional Mexican birthday song, has been sung. The chant is widely popular.

== "La Chica Chiquitibum" ==
During the 1986 FIFA World Cup hosted in Mexico City, Chiquitibum became associated with Spanish-born model and actress Mar Castro when she appeared in a Carta Blanca beer commercial featuring the chant. For the next four years, she toured Mexico, sponsored by the brewery.
