= Moisés Hipólito =

Mexican footballer (born 1992)

Personal information
- Full name: Moisés Hipólito León
- Date of birth: 15 March 1992 (age 34)
- Place of birth: Minatitlán, Veracruz, Mexico
- Height: 1.75 m (5 ft 9 in)
- Position: Forward

Youth career
- 2008–2013: Cruz Azul

Senior career*
Years	Team	Apps	(Gls)
2013–2016	Cruz Azul Hidalgo	93	(31)
2016–2019	UAEM	55	(15)
2018–2019	→ Atlético Reynosa (loan)	34	(10)
2019	Alebrijes de Oaxaca	3	(0)
2020–2021	Zacatecas	33	(7)
- * Club domestic league appearances and goals as of 10:07, 12 June 2022 (UTC)

Moisés Hipólito León (born 15 March 1992) is a Mexican professional footballer. He made his professional debut with Cruz Azul during a Copa MX victory over Lobos BUAP on 23 January 2013.
