= Omar Tejeda =

Mexican footballer (born 1988)

Personal information
- Full name: Omar Alejandro Tejeda López
- Date of birth: 22 August 1988 (age 38)
- Place of birth: Veracruz, Mexico
- Height: 1.74 m (5 ft 8 1/2 in)
- Position: Midfielder

Senior career*
Years	Team	Apps	(Gls)
2005–2011	Veracruz	18	(0)
2006–2008	→ Coatzacoalcos (loan)	18	(0)
2008–2009	→ Córdoba (loan)	4	(3)
2009	→ Tampico Madero (loan)	5	(1)
2011–2018	BUAP	191	(30)
2018	→ Melgar (loan)	20	(9)
2018–2019	Correcaminos UAT	25	(6)
2020	Melgar	11	(2)
- * Club domestic league appearances and goals as of 31 December 2020 (UTC)

Omar Tejeda (born August 8, 1988) is a Mexican former professional footballer.

== Honours ==
Lobos BUAP

- Ascenso MX (1): Clausura 2017
- Campeón de Ascenso (1): 2016-17
