= Lorenzo López =

Mexican association football player

Personal information
- Full name: Lorenzo Javier López Balboa
- Date of birth: 24 October 1963 (age 63)
- Place of birth: El Mante, Tamaulipas, Mexico
- Height: 1.92 m (6 ft 3 1/2 in)

Managerial career
- Years: Team
- 2007–2008: Troyanos UDEM
- 2009–2013: Deportivo Guamúchil
- 2015–2016: Murciélagos
- 2017–2018: Atlético Saltillo Soccer
- 2018–2019: Murciélagos
- 2019–2020: Gavilanes de Matamoros
- 2021–2022: Cadereyta
- 2025: UAT (Assistant)

Lorenzo Javier López Balboa (born October 24, 1963) is a Mexican football manager.

Throughout his career he has served as manager of Troyanos UDEM, Murciélagos (at three times), Atlético Saltillo Soccer and Gavilanes de Matamoros.
