= Luis Gorocito =

Uruguayan footballer (born 1992)

Personal information
- Full name: Luis Antonio Gorocito Resende
- Date of birth: October 15, 1992 (age 34)
- Place of birth: Montevideo, Uruguay
- Height: 1.89 m (6 ft 2 in)
- Position: Forward

Team information
- Current team: Racing de Montevideo
- Number: 8

Senior career*
Years	Team	Apps	(Gls)
2012–2014	Racing de Montevideo	46	(17)
2014–2015	→ Necaxa (loan)	26	(6)
2020–2023	Racing de Montevideo	76	(18)
2023	Deportes Puerto Montt	11	(2)
2024–	Racing de Montevideo	3	(0)
- * Club domestic league appearances and goals as of 26 March 2024

Luis Antonio Gorocito Resende (born October 15, 1992, in Montevideo, Uruguay) is an Uruguayan professional footballer who plays for Racing de Montevideo.

== Arrest ==
On August 16, 2015, Gorocito was arrested along with another Necaxa player, Alejandro Molina, for hitting two young men outside a bar called "El Barezzito" in Aguascalientes, leaving them seriously injured, one of them died two months later from his injuries. The initial charges were for intentional homicide, although two years later in 2017, the defense managed to prove that Gorocito had not fought directly with him, for which the sentence was considerably reduced and he only faced charges for "culpable homicide generated in a fight." In August 2019, he was released after four years in a Mexican prison.
