= Diego Hernández (footballer, born 1993) =

Mexican footballer (born 1993)

Personal information
- Full name: Diego Hernández Basulto
- Date of birth: 12 February 1993 (age 33)
- Place of birth: Guadalajara, Jalisco, Mexico
- Height: 1.75 m (5 ft 9 in)
- Position: Winger

Youth career
- 2010–2011: Atlas
- 2011–2014: Guadalajara

Senior career*
Years	Team	Apps	(Gls)
2014–2017	Guadalajara	1	(0)
2015	→ Coras (loan)	39	(7)
2016	→ Atlético San Luis (loan)	6	(1)
2016	→ Coras (loan)	4	(0)
2017	→ UdeG (loan)	2	(0)
2017–2018	La Piedad	34	(7)
2018–2019	Tuxtla	24	(2)
- * Club domestic league appearances and goals

Diego Hernández Basulto (born February 12, 1993) is a former Mexican footballer who last played as a winger for Tuxtla.

== Career ==
=== C.D. Guadalajara ===
Hernández made his professional debut with the club on 27 April 2014 against Monterrey.

==== Loan at Coras ====
Hernández was loaned to Coras to gain more playing experience.
