= Jorge Humberto Torres =

Mexican footballer and manager (born 1962)

Personal information
- Full name: Jorge Humberto Torres Mata
- Date of birth: 27 August 1962 (age 64)
- Place of birth: Guadalajara, Jalisco, Mexico
- Height: 1.76 m (5 ft 9 1/2 in)
- Position: Forward

Senior career*
Years	Team	Apps	(Gls)
1979–1987	Atlas		
1987–1991	Estudiantes Tecos		

Managerial career
- 2004: Atlas (Assistant)
- 2005: Atlas
- 2005–2006: Coyotes de Sonora
- 2006–2007: Académicos de Atlas
- 2008: Salamanca
- 2011: Tijuana Reserves and Academy
- 2012: Académicos de Atlas
- 2012–2013: Atlas (Assistant)
- 2014: Celaya
- 2015: Cimarrones de Sonora
- 2016: Albinegros de Orizaba
- 2017: Chiapas Reserves and Academy
- 2018–2019: Gavilanes de Matamoros
- 2019–2022: Catedráticos Élite F.C.
- * Club domestic league appearances and goals

Jorge Humberto Torres Mata (born August 27, 1962) is a Mexican football manager and former player.
