= Carlos Bustos =

Argentine footballer and manager

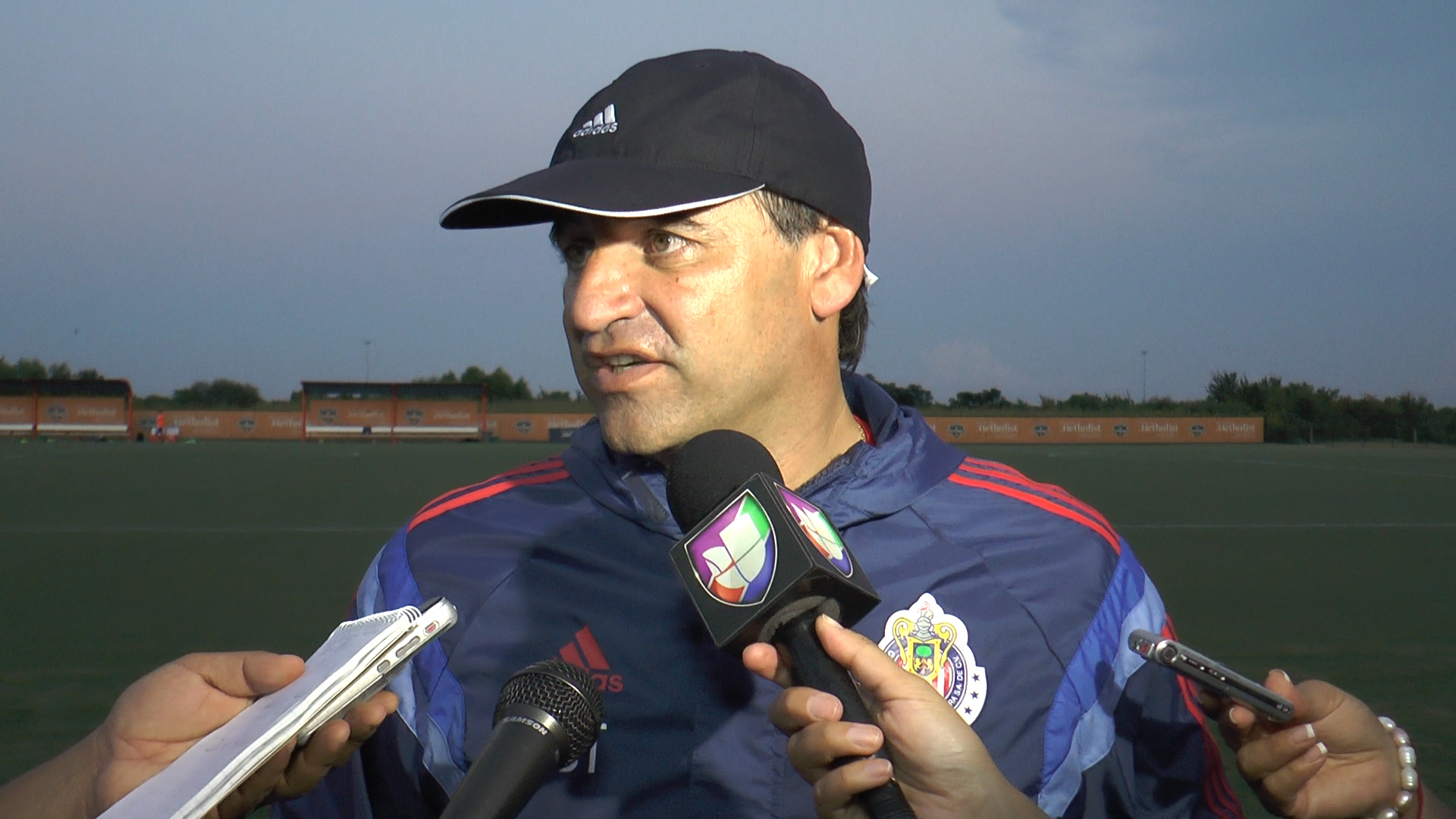
- Bustos in 2014

Personal information
- Full name: Carlos Julio Bustos
- Date of birth: 16 April 1966 (age 60)
- Place of birth: Villa Carlos Paz, Argentina
- Height: 1.76 m (5 ft 9 in)
- Position: Defender

Youth career
- Talleres

Senior career*
Years	Team	Apps	(Gls)
1985–1990	Talleres	77	(2)
1990–1992	Deportivo Español	86	(3)
1991	→ San Lorenzo (loan)	6	(1)
1993	River Plate	17	(1)
1993–1994	Argentinos Juniors	32	(0)
1994–1996	Independiente	4	
1996–1997	Atlético Morelia	32	(0)
1998	Pachuca		
1998	Huracán	8	(0)
1998	Morelia		

Managerial career
- 2005: Sportivo Belgrano
- 2007: Atlas (assistant)
- 2008: Talleres (interim)
- 2008–2009: Talleres (assistant)
- 2009–2012: Morelia (assistant)
- 2012–2013: Neza
- 2013–2014: Morelia
- 2014: Guadalajara
- 2015: Sinaloa
- 2016: Atlético San Luis
- 2016: Chiapas
- 2018–2019: Universidad San Martín
- 2019–2020: Melgar
- 2021–2022: Alianza Lima
- 2023–2024: Blooming
- 2025: The Strongest
- 2025: Deportivo Garcilaso
- 2026: UTC
- * Club domestic league appearances and goals

Carlos Julio Bustos (born 16 April 1966) is an Argentine professional football manager and former player who played as a defender.

Bustos played as a central defender for the Argentinian teams Talleres, Deportivo Español, San Lorenzo, River Plate, Argentinos Juniors, Independiente, and Huracán. He played internationally for Pachuca and Morelia in two stints, the latter being his last team before retirement.

Bustos is the former manager of Talleres, the Argentine team where he began his football career. His coaching career developed primarily in México, where he coached Neza, Morelia, Guadalajara, Dorados de Sinaloa, Atlético San Luis, and Cafetaleros de Tapachula. In Peru he coached Universidad San Martín, Melgar and Alianza Lima.

== Playing career ==
Bustos began his football career at 11 years old with Club Atlético Talleres, where he debuted in the first division. He was awarded the Córdoba Cuna de Campeones in 1987 as the best football player in the Province of Cordoba.

In 1990, he was transferred to Deportivo Español during one of the most important periods of the institution's history, participating in the CONMEBOL cup and Liguilla Pre Libertadores. In 1991, he was loaned out to the champion club Club Atlético San Lorenzo de Almagro to participate in the Liguilla Pre Libertadores.

In January 1993, he joined Club Atlético River Plate, through which he entered several international competitions, among them the Copa Libertadores. At the end of 1993, Asociación Atlética Argentinos Juniors incorporated him and other international players, making a team that played the national tournaments and the Supercopa.

From 1994 to 1996, he defended the colors of Club Atlético Independent and became champion of the Supercopa and Recopa Sudamericana. In December 1996, he was hired by Monarcas Morelia of Mexico, a team on a downward slope. Under his leadership the team improved and reached the semi-final of the tournament.

At the beginning of 1998, he arrived at Club de Fútbol Pachuca to play the First A tournament, obtaining a promotion to the first division. In June of the same year, he returned to Argentina to wear the jersey of Club Atlético Huracán, though his stay in the club was brief.

He was asked by Tomas Boy and Monarcas Morelia to again play the closing tournament in 1999. However, as a result of multiple knee injuries, this was his last tournament as a professional player.

== Managerial career ==
Having reached the end of his career as a player, Bustos began his career as a coach in Argentina in 2000 for the youth league of Talleres de Córdoba, winning championships in both tournaments in the 6th category of the Asociación Cordobesa de Fútbol. He was the sports director of Club Atlético Universitario (Córdoba) in 2001, a team that was playing in the Argentinos B tournament. He was also the sports director of Club Atlético Belgrano from 2002 to 2005, competing in the tournaments of the National B.

In 2005, Bustos was named head coach of his first professional team, Sportivo Belgrano de San Francisco, Argentina, where he competed in the Federal B tournament.

Bustos joined the Mexican football team Atlas de Guadalajara in 2007 as assistant coach to Tomás Boy. After the season, he returned to Argentina again to the Club Atlético Talleres, where he was coach of the 4th category of A.F.A., eventually becoming the interim head coach of the first team. Following the restructuring of the club, he remained as assistant coach of the first division under the direction of Humberto Grondona and Juan Amador Sánchez.

In 2009, he was again requested by Tomás Boy to join his coaching staff, this time for Monarcas Morelia, a team they were a part of until the end of the 2012 tournament closure. They qualified in 5 playoffs, becoming sub-champions of the LIGA MX in 2011 and champions of the SuperLiga Norteamericana 2010.

In early 2012, Bustos got his first opportunity to head a coaching staff in Mexico's professional football circles, coaching Neza FC in the ASCENSO MX, qualifying for the playoffs and the semifinal of the COPA MX.

For the 7th game of the closing tournament in 2013, he was asked by Monarcas Morelia to replace head coach Ruben Omar Romano. In this season, he had a winning streak which extended from the first game to the first game in the playoffs, finishing in the 4th overall. In the next season, his team again reached the playoffs, finishing in 6th place. For this same tournament, on November 5, he was champion of the Copa México Apertura 2013, disputing this title with the Atlas of Guadalajara, giving Monarcas Morelia his first title of COPA MX and his second official title in Mexican football.

For the opening tournament in 2014, he joined Club Deportivo Guadalajara, one of the most important and historic teams of Mexican football, reaching the quarterfinals of the COPA MX. He resigned as head coach of Guadalajara after only winning two of the first ten games in Apertura 2014.

In late 2015, Dorados de Sinaloa made use of his services to lead the team in the ASCENSO MX tournament, in which he obtained the title of champion against Atlético San Luis playing as a visitor. With this title, Dorados de Sinaloa was able to play the final against the champion of the previous season. On 23 May, Bustos and Dorados de Sinaloa defeated Necaxa, playing as a visitor, returning the team to the first division of Mexican football after a nine-year absence.

In early 2016, he was in charge of Cafetaleros de Tapachula, another team from the ASCENSO MX league. In late 2016, he was hired by Atletico San Luis from the ASCENSO MX league, reaching the semifinals of COPA MX with this team.

In 2017, he advised and trained the San Francisco United F.C. in California, United States.

From January 2018 to December 2019, he coached the Club Deportivo Universidad de San Martin de Porres squad, the Liga 1 team. This project was characterized by the participation almost entirely of young players; Bustos debuted more than 18 players within those two years.

On Monday, 2 December 2019, he was announced as the new coach of Arequipa's team FBC Melgar. On 24 September 2020, following the loss to rival Cienciano, the club announced that they would be parting ways with Bustos.

Bustos was named manager of Alianza Lima for the 2021 season. On 11 September 2022, Alianza Lima announced they part ways from the first team after winning the League last year.

On 19 February 2023, Bustos switched teams and countries again, after being named in charge of Blooming. He left the club by mutual consent on 20 October 2024, and took over The Strongest the following 17 April.

On 10 July 2025, Bustos left The Strongest, and took over Deportivo Garcilaso back in Peru the following day. He left the club by mutual consent on 13 November.

== Personal life ==
Bustos' younger brother Fabián is also a manager and former footballer. A forward, he had the most of his managerial career in Ecuador.

== Managerial Statistics ==
As of matches played 28 November 2021

Managerial record by team and tenure
Team	From	To	Record								Ref
Team	From	To	G	W	D	L	GF	GA	GD	Win %	Ref
Toros Neza	1 July 2012	18 February 2013	33	13	9	11	37	38	−1	39.39	
Morelia	18 February 2013	26 January 2014	46	23	12	11	75	55	+20	50.00	
Chivas	12 May 2014	3 October 2014	17	6	4	7	17	19	−2	35.29	
Sinaloa	11 November 2014	27 September 2015	42	20	8	14	63	52	+11	47.62	
San Luis	1 January 2016	4 May 2016	23	7	5	11	23	31	−8	30.43	
Chiapas	29 May 2016	28 August 2016	11	1	5	5	10	18	−8	9.09	
Universidad San Martin	1 January 2018	28 November 2019	82	21	34	27	97	113	−16	25.61	
FBC Melgar	2 December 2019	24 September 2020	15	5	4	6	17	19	−2	33.33	
Alianza Lima	15 January 2021	Present	29	17	9	3	42	19	+23	58.62	
Career Totals			298	113	90	95	381	364	+17	37.92	

== Honours ==
=== Player ===
San Lorenzo

- Liguilla Prelibertadores: 1991

Independiente

- Supercopa:1995
- Recopa Sudamericana: 1995

Pachuca

- Campeón de Ascenso:Final de Ascenso 1997–98

=== Manager ===
Morelia

- Copa MX: Apertura 2013

Sinaloa

- Ascenso MX: Clausura 2015
- Campeón de Ascenso : 2014–15

Alianza Lima

- Peruvian Primera División: 2021
