= Cimarrones de Sonora =

Mexican football club

- Full name: Cimarrones de Sonora Fútbol Club
- Nicknames: Los Cimarrones (The Feral Goats); Los Sonorenses (The Sonorenses); El Rebaño del Desierto (The Flock of the Desert)
- Founded: 18 July 2004; 22 years ago
- Ground: Estadio Héroe de Nacozari; Hermosillo, Sonora
- Capacity: 22,074
- Owner: List: Félix Tonella, Alejandro Camou, Servando Carbajal, Saúl Rojo
- Chairman: Juan Pablo Rojo
- Manager: Vacant
- League: Liga Premier (Serie A)
- 2025–26: Regular phase: 3rd (Group I); Final phase: Runner–up (Reserves teams)
Home colours	Away colours	Third colours

Cimarrones de Sonora Fútbol Club, simplified as Cimarrones de Sonora FC, is a Mexican professional football club based in Hermosillo, Sonora. It competes in Liga Premier, the third level division of Mexican football, and playa its home matches at the Estadio Héroe de Nacozari. On 20 August 2026, the team ceased all professional and youth operations due to uncertainty regarding the future promotion and relegation system in Mexican football.

== History ==
The "Cimarrones de Sonora" were born in 2004, when the "Pioneers" of Pioneros de Cancun II became the champions of the Third Division of Mexico and thus were promoted to Second División 2. After the ascent, with the goal of reaching the Primera “A” of Mexico, employers and trustees of Hermosillo origin, led by Edmundo Ruiz, acquired the franchise as a whole, since this had an agreement with the Club America. After this happened, the Mexican Football Federation communicated to employers that the franchise did not have approval to participate in the precinct Miguel Aleman, since it lacked the minimum infrastructure requirements, hospitality, transportation, etc. That's when managers decided to move the franchise to Hermosillo, renaming the club to "Maroons of Sonora" and having as coach Enrique Ferreira. That was how the team played its first game in the second division against Pegaso Anahucc, which ended with the score tied at 0–0. On August 30 they recorded their first victory by defeating 2–1 the Vaqueros de Ameca. As a result of this first tournament, the Apertura 2004, the team finished in 7th position in the overall standings. The next tournament ended again in with the Cimarrones in the 7th position. In the 2005 Apertura tournament with Angel Monares as coach, the team improved significantly. He finished top of Group 1 of the Premier League and fourth place overall in the second division. Maroons played the final against the Potros UAEM. In the first leg 1–0 Maroons emerged victorious Estadio Hector Espino at full capacity, however, in the second leg they beat the Potros UAEM in Estadio Alberto "Chivo" Córdoba by a score of 2–0 in overtime, finishing as runners-up of the tournament. Nothing much happened with the franchise for the next few years, except for winning the 2008 Apertura, which was a great accomplishment. Seven years later, in the Clausura 2015, another coaching change was made, and Jorge Humberto Torres was hired. The team finished in fourth place in the overall standings and were eliminated in the semi-finals by Loros de la Universidad de Colima.

=== Liga de Ascenso ===
On May 29, 2015, after announcing the expansion of the Liga de Ascenso, it was announced that the team would be promoted, beginning with the Clausura 2015 season, to the league. This marked the highest the Maroons had reached on the Mexican pyramid. The team has since made the quarterfinals of the Ascenso three times, never advancing beyond this round.

=== Liga de Expansión ===
In the summer of 2020, many financial problems of the member clubs of Ascenso MX caused the second level of Mexican football to become the Liga de Expansión MX, a new league focused on the development of footballers, so in exchange for financial support, promotion was eliminated for six years, Cimarrones was one of the founding teams of the new league. Cimarrones de Sonora achieved the league runner-up position in the Clausura 2022.

Although Cimarrones was successful in terms of sports, the team was unable to attract the support of local fans, so in June 2024, the owners of the team sold their place to businessmen from Chiapas, who wanted to move the franchise to Tuxtla Gutiérrez to use it to refound Jaguares F.C. However, the new team had to be approved by the owner's assembly. On July 12, the vote was held, and the project was not approved by the partners, so the franchise was put on hiatus for the 2024–25 season.

In the summer of 2025 the club received an offer from the owners of Club Jaiba Brava for buy the Cimarrones franchise in the Liga de Expansión and thus become a full member of the league; however, although there was an agreement between the clubs, the other team owners in the league rejected the purchase, so Cimarrones received an extra year of hiatus. Finally, in April 2026, a second attempt was made and approved by the league members, making Jaiba Brava an official team in the league starting with the 2026–27 season, while Cimarrones will remain in the Liga Premier de México.

=== Return to Liga Premier ===
Since its arrival in the Ascenso MX in 2015, Cimarrones de Sonora maintained a second team in the Liga Premier de México, the third tier of Mexican football, the team was known as Cimarrones de Sonora Premier. In June 2024 this squad became the club's main team to ensure the historical continuity of the Cimarrones, although playing in a lower category than they did between 2015 and 2024.

=== Temporary retirement from professional football ===
In July 2026, the club paused its participation in the Liga Premier due to uncertainty regarding the future of the promotion system in Mexican football.It was confirmed in August 2026 that the club did not register a team for the Liga TDP season. It was confirmed all youth programs will remain shut down for about a few years, and would maybe brought back when the team returned.

== Stadium ==
Cimarrones de Sonora play their home matches at the Estadio Héroe de Nacozari in Hermosillo, Sonora. The stadium capacity is 18,747 people. Its surface is covered by natural grass. The stadium was opened in 1985.

== Season to season ==
Season	Division	Place
Apertura 2013	Segunda División de México	17th
Clausura 2014	Segunda División de México	17th
Apertura 2014	Segunda División de México	Runners-up
Clausura 2015	Segunda División de México	Quarter-finals
Apertura 2015	Ascenso MX	16th
Clausura 2016	Ascenso MX	16th
Apertura 2016	Ascenso MX	7th (quarter-finals)
Clausura 2017	Ascenso MX	8th (quarter-finals)
Apertura 2017	Ascenso MX	9th
Clausura 2018	Ascenso MX	14th
Apertura 2018	Ascenso MX	4th (quarter-finals)
Clausura 2019	Ascenso MX	10th
Apertura 2019	Ascenso MX	9th
Clasura 2020	Ascenso MX	Cancelled (9th)
Guardianes 2020	Liga de Expansión MX	3rd (Reclassification)
Guardianes 2021	Liga de Expansión MX	3rd (quarter-finals)
Apertura 2021	Liga de Expansión MX	8th (Reclassification)
Clausura 2022	Liga de Expansión MX	2nd (Runner-up)
Apertura 2022	Liga de Expansión MX	4th (semi-finals)

== Honours ==
=== National ===
==== Promotion divisions ====
- Liga de Expansión MX
  - Champions (2): Apertura 2008, Apertura 2012
  - Third Place (1): Clausura 2022
- Segunda División
  - Champions (3): Apertura 2014, Clausura 2014, Apertura 2017

== Personnel ==
=== Coaching staff ===
Position	Staff
Manager	(Mexico) Valentín Arredondo
Assistant manager	(Mexico) Miguel Martínez
Goalkeeper coach	(Mexico) Juan Vargas
Fitness coach	(Mexico) José Miguel Ceja
Physiotherapist	(Mexico) Sergio Contreras
Team doctor	(Mexico) Eloi Soriano

== Players ==
=== First-team squad ===
As of 10 January 2026

Note: Flags indicate national team as defined under FIFA eligibility rules; some limited exceptions apply. Players may hold more than one non-FIFA nationality.

No.	Pos.	Nation	Player
1	GK	MEX	Manuel Fimbres
3	DF	MEX	Francisco Guerrero
4	DF	MEX	Raúl Beltrán
5	DF	MEX	Iván Ruiz
6	DF	MEX	Diego Araujo
7	MF	MEX	Francisco Meza
8	MF	MEX	Pablo Molina
9	FW	MEX	Nelson Rodríguez
10	MF	MEX	Bryant Navarro
11	MF	MEX	Aldo Serna
13	MF	MEX	Tomás Encinas
14	MF	MEX	Christian Fernández
15	MF	MEX	Elian Valenzuela

No.	Pos.	Nation	Player
16	GK	MEX	Manuel López
17	MF	MEX	Ricardo Encinas
18	MF	MEX	Diego Hernández
19	FW	MEX	Martín Zamorano
20	FW	MEX	Henry López
21	MF	MEX	Azael González
22	MF	MEX	Gilberto Cajita
23	FW	MEX	Néstor Pérez
24	DF	MEX	Melchor López
25	DF	MEX	Marlon Robles
26	DF	MEX	Ángel Sánchez
27	MF	MEX	Emmir Pérez
28	DF	MEX	Jesús Tobie

=== Out on loan ===
Note: Flags indicate national team as defined under FIFA eligibility rules; some limited exceptions apply. Players may hold more than one non-FIFA nationality.

No. / Pos. / Nation / Player; — / MF / MEX / Diego Hernández (at Los Cabos United)	No. / Pos. / Nation / Player; — / FW / MEX / Aldo Encinas (at Pachuca)

=== Reserve teams ===
Cimarrones de Sonora (Liga TDP)
Reserve team that plays in the Liga TDP, the fourth level of the Mexican league system.

== Managers ==
- (Mexico) Enrique Ferreira (2013)
- (Mexico) Ángel Monares (2013–14)
- (Mexico) Jorge Humberto Torres (2015)
- (Spain) Javier López (interim) (2015)
- (Mexico) Héctor Medrano (2016)
- (Mexico) Juan Carlos Chávez (2016–2017)
- (Mexico) Mario García Covalles (2017–2018)
- (Mexico) Héctor Altamirano (2018)
- (Mexico) Isaac Morales Domínguez (2019–2020)
- (Argentina) Gabriel Pereyra (2020–2022)
- (Mexico) Roberto Hernández (2022–2024)
- (Mexico) Valentín Arredondo (2024–2026)

== See also ==
- Football in Mexico
