= Leandro Carrijó =

Brazilian footballer (born 1985)

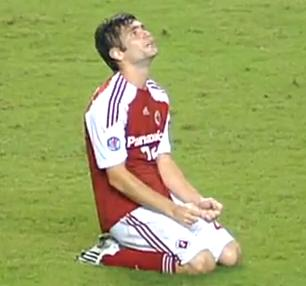
- Carrijó with South China in 2009

Personal information
- Full name: Leandro Carrijó Silva
- Date of birth: 3 September 1985 (age 41)
- Place of birth: Uberaba, Brazil
- Height: 1.87 m (6 ft 2 in)
- Position: Forward

Team information
- Current team: Juárez (assistant)

Youth career
- 2004–2005: Atlético Mineiro

Senior career*
| Years | Team | Apps | (Gls) |
| 2005–2009 | Atlético Mineiro | 3 | (1) |
| 2005 | → Nacional-MG (loan) | | |
| 2006 | → Uberaba-MG (loan) | | |
| 2007 | → Democrata-MG (loan) | | |
| 2007–2008 | → Portuguesa-SP (loan) | 1 | (1) |
| 2008–2009 | → Vitória Setúbal (loan) | 14 | (3) |
| 2009 | South China | 13 | (9) |
| 2010 | → Bangu (loan) | 7 | (1) |
| 2010–2012 | → TSW Pegasus (loan) | 23 | (17) |
| 2013 | Rio Verde-GO | 9 | (2) |
| 2013–2014 | Celaya | 25 | (12) |
| 2014–2015 | San Luis | 28 | (16) |
| 2015–2020 | Juárez | 136 | (62) |
| 2020–2021 | El Paso Locomotive | 40 | (4) |

Managerial career
- 2024–2026: Juárez Reserves and Academy
- 2026–: Juárez (assistant)
- * Club domestic league appearances and goals

Leandro Carrijó Silva (born 3 September 1985) is a Brazilian former professional footballer who played as a forward.

== Career ==
=== Atlético Mineiro ===
Carrijó made his professional debut for Atlético Mineiro in a 1–1 home draw against Atlético-PR in the Série A on 2 June 2007, as a 64th-minute substitute for Éder Luís.

He scored his first professional goal for Atlético Mineiro in a 4–1 home win over América-RN in the Série A on 19 July 2007.

=== South China ===
Carrijó joined South China in August 2009 and was also registered to play for them in the 2009 AFC Cup. He scored against FK Neftchi Farg'ona in a 5–4 away defeat and then scored the winner in the 1–0 home game to put South China through to the semi-finals. But he failed to score against Kuwait SC in both legs of the semi-final and South China lost the tie 3–1.

=== TSW Pegasus ===
Carrijó joined TSW Pegasus on loan from South China in January 2011. He was registered as one of the three foreign players of the club in the 2011 AFC Cup. On 13 April 2011, he scored four times as TSW Pegasus beat VB Sports Club of Maldives 5–3 in Male. After scoring two more goals against Song Lam Nghe An, Carrijo becomes the leading goalscorer in the 2011 AFC Cup with seven goals.

=== Return to Brazil ===
In 2013 Carrijó returned to Brazil for Rio Verde-GO. He was released after the end of Campeonato Goiano.

He joined Mexican club Celaya. He played 11 times and scored 5 goals in 2013–14 Apertura season. He also scored once in three games of Apertura 2013 Copa MX.

== Career statistics ==
As of 27 March 2012

| Club | Season | League | | Senior Shield | | League Cup | | FA Cup | | AFC Cup | | Total | |
| Club | Season | Apps | Goals | Apps | Goals | Apps | Goals | Apps | Goals | Apps | Goals | Apps | Goals |
|---|---|---|---|---|---|---|---|---|---|---|---|---|---|
| South China | 2009-10 | 4 (0) | 4 | 0 (0) | 0 | 0 (0) | 0 | 0 (0) | 0 | 4 (0) | 2 | 8 (0) | 6 |
| | 2010-11 | 9 (4) | 6 | 0 (0) | 0 | 0 (0) | 0 | 0 (0) | 0 | 0 (0) | 0 | 9 (0) | 6 |
| | All | 13 (4) | 10 | 0 (0) | 0 | 0 (0) | 0 | 0 (0) | 0 | 4 (0) | 2 | 17 (0) | 12 |

As of 16 April 2012

| Club | Season | League | | Senior Shield | | League Cup | | FA Cup | | AFC Cup | | Total | |
| Club | Season | Apps | Goals | Apps | Goals | Apps | Goals | Apps | Goals | Apps | Goals | Apps | Goals |
|---|---|---|---|---|---|---|---|---|---|---|---|---|---|
| TSW Pegasus | 2010-11 | 9 (0) | 6 | 0 (0) | 0 | 0 (0) | 0 | 0 (0) | 0 | 6 (0) | 7 | 15 (0) | 13 |
| | 2011-12 | 14 (3) | 10 | 2 (0) | 1 | 3 (0) | 2 | 0 (0) | 0 | 0 (0) | 0 | 19 (3) | 13 |
| | All | 23(3) | 16 | 2 (0) | 1 | 3 (0) | 2 | 0 (0) | 0 | 6 (0) | 7 | 34 (3) | 26 |

== Honours ==
FC Juárez:

- Ascenso MX: Apertura 2015

Atlético Mineiro:

- Minas Gerais State League: 2007
