= Murciélagos F.C. =

Association football club in Mexico

Murciélagos
- Full name: Murciélagos Fútbol Club
- Nicknames: Los Murciélagos (The Bats); Los Caballeros de la Noche (The Dark Knights)
- Founded: 1 January 2008; 17 years ago
- Dissolved: June 2020; 5 years ago
- Ground: Estadio Centenario; Los Mochis, Sinaloa, Mexico
- Capacity: 11,134
- League: Lige Premier - Serie A
- 2019–20: 7th, Group I (Tournament abandoned)
Home colours	Away colours

Murciélagos Fútbol Club was a Mexican football club that played in the Liga Premier. The club was based in Los Mochis, Sinaloa. From its beginnings, the club had the aim to turn into a model for Mexican football.

== History ==
Founded in 2008 and with headquarters in Sinaloa's "Region of the Évora", Murciélagos was property of Grupo Faharo. Murciélagos FC broadcast their live games every Friday Nights at 10:00 pm central time in Mexico on the most interactive page of Internet of Mexican football 2 of Sinaloa were transmitted also by television opened by the channel.

On January 23, 2010, Murciélagos made history for being the first team in the world to allow its fans to vote through the Web for their starting lineup, supported by FIFA. The game was won by Murciélagos 1–0 to Vaqueros de Tepic of the Liga Premier of the Segunda División de México supervised by Juan Manuel Romo being the first coach that made history with this novel system and, at the same time, having the largest number of auxiliary technical personnel in the world. In the electronic football called Juan Manuel Navarro was the first player that entered to the field under this novel method replacing Sergio Mejía in the change.

The club was originally based in Guamúchil, Sinaloa, but was relocated to Los Mochis when it was announced on June 7, 2015, that they would participate in the second division, the Liga de Ascenso de México, after they bought the Irapuato franchise. After its relocation to Los Mochis, the team remained in the Ascenso MX until Torneo Clausura 2018, when it was relegated to Segunda División de México due to poor results.

== Relegation & Hiatus ==
After two seasons in the Segunda División de México, in 2020 the team decided to pause its participation in the Liga Premier as a result of the economic crisis derived from the coronavirus epidemic, in addition to the uncertainty of the board to continue participating in the competitions organized by the FMF due to the reform carried out in the Ascenso MX which was transformed into the Liga de Expansión MX focused on the development of footballers over the promotion of teams to the Primera División de México.

In March 2022, the municipal president declared that his council would revoke the team's lease if it continued to sit abandoned and in disrepair. A few months later, the team announced on their social media that their return to the Liga MX was imminent, but they have yet to affiliate with any league or announce their roster as of May 2024.

== Stadium ==
Murciélagos FC played their home matches at the Estadio Centenario in Los Mochis, Sinaloa. It is owned by Ayuntamiento de Ahome, and its surface is covered by natural grass. The stadium was opened in early 2003, but has been empty since the team paused its league participation in 2020.

At the beginning of 2024, the council approved to dissolve the lease.

== Season to season ==
Season	Division	Place
Apertura 2012	2nd Division	Champions
Clausura 2013	2nd Division	11 (Lost Promotional Final)
Apertura 2013	2nd Division	4
Clausura 2014	2nd Division	15
Apertura 2014	2nd Division	11 (Copa; Champions)
Clausura 2015	2nd Division	20
Apertura 2015	Ascenso MX	5 (quarter-finals)
Clausura 2016	Ascenso MX	13
Apertura 2016	Ascenso MX	13
Clausura 2017	Ascenso MX	18
Apertura 2017	Ascenso MX	13
Clausura 2018	Ascenso MX	14 (Relegated)

== Managers ==
- (Mexico) Manuel Romo (April 2009–March 10)
- (Mexico) Manuel Flores (March 2010–July 11)
- (Mexico) Lorenzo López (July 2011–July 12)
- (Argentina) Rubén "Ratón" Ayala (July 2012–Nov 12)
- (Mexico) Roberto Sandoval (Nov 2012–Feb 13)
- (Mexico) Lorenzo López (2nd Term; Feb 2013–Sept 13)
- (Uruguay) Cesilio de los Santos (2013–14)
- (Mexico) Roberto Castro (2014–15)
- (Mexico) Lorenzo López (3rd Term; June 2015–16)
- (Mexico) Jorge Manrique (2016)
- (Mexico) Adolfo Garcia (2016)
- (Argentina) Aldo Da Pozzo (2016–2017)
- (Chile) Marco Antonio Figueroa (2017)
- (Mexico) Luis Mendoza (2017)
- (Colombia) Óscar Gil (2017–)

== See also ==
- Football in Mexico
