= Gabriel Hachen =

Argentine footballer

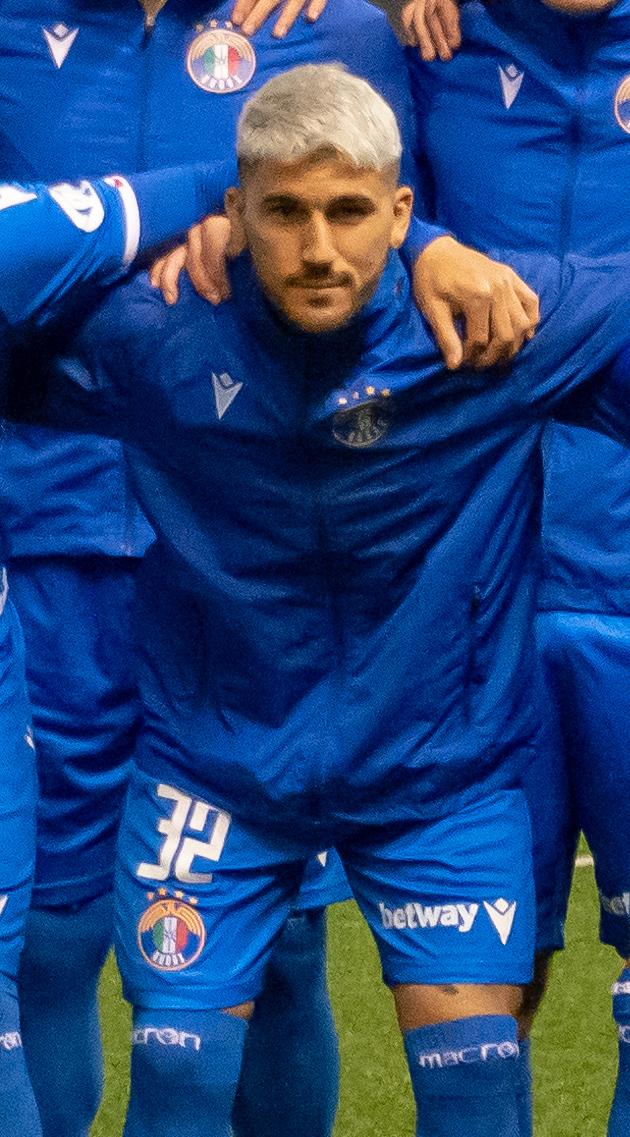

Personal information
- Full name: Gabriel Alejandro Hachen
- Date of birth: 16 October 1990 (age 36)
- Place of birth: Santa Fe, Argentina
- Height: 1.65 m (5 ft 5 in)
- Position: Forward

Team information
- Current team: San Martín SJ

Youth career
- Newell's Old Boys

Senior career*
Years	Team	Apps	(Gls)
2011–2014	Newell's Old Boys	5	(0)
2014–2016	Atlante	51	(12)
2016–2018	Dorados	77	(18)
2018–2020	Juárez	44	(9)
2020–2022	Defensa y Justicia	55	(5)
2022–2023	Independiente	11	(0)
2023–2024	Audax Italiano	24	(2)
2024–2025	Platense	16	(2)
2025–2026	San Martín Tucumán	23	(0)
2026–	San Martín SJ	4	(0)
- * Club domestic league appearances and goals as of 19:00, 19 March 2026 (UTC)

Gabriel Alejandro Hachen (born October 16, 1990) is an Argentine professional footballer who plays for San Martín SJ.
