= List of Mexican football transfers summer 2016 =

This is a list of Mexican football transfers for the 2016 summer transfer window, grouped by club. It only includes football transfers related to clubs from the Liga Bancomer MX, the top flight of Mexican football.

== Liga Bancomer MX ==
=== América ===
In: Note: Flags indicate national team as defined under FIFA eligibility rules; some limited exceptions apply. Players may hold more than one non-FIFA nationality.

No.	Pos.	Nation	Player
9	FW	ARG	Silvio Romero (from Chiapas)
18	DF	PAR	Bruno Valdez (from (Paraguay) Cerro Porteño)
20	FW	MEX	Manuel Pérez (from UNAM)
29	MF	MEX	Carlos Rosel (loan return from Atlante)
30	MF	ECU	Renato Ibarra (from (Netherlands) Vitesse)
289	FW	MEX	Ricardo Cruz (from Chiapas)

Out: Note: Flags indicate national team as defined under FIFA eligibility rules; some limited exceptions apply. Players may hold more than one non-FIFA nationality.

No.	Pos.	Nation	Player
8	MF	COL	Andrés Andrade (to León)
9	FW	ARG	Darío Benedetto (to (Argentina) Boca Juniors)
18	MF	URU	Brian Lozano (on loan to (Uruguay) Nacional)
26	MF	MEX	Francisco Rivera (on loan to Veracruz)
286	FW	MEX	Alejandro Díaz (on loan to Necaxa)
301	MF	MEX	Víctor Rodríguez (on loan to Oaxaca)
303	MF	MEX	Daniel Vázquez (on loan to Oaxaca)
—	GK	MEX	Armando Navarrete (on loan to Zacatepec, previously on loan at Sonora)
—	DF	MEX	José Hernández (on loan to UAT, previously on loan at Sonora)
—	DF	MEX	Néstor Martínez (on loan to Oaxaca, previously on loan at Cancún)
—	DF	MEX	Jesús Veyna (on loan to Zacatepec, previously on loan at Atl. San Luis)
—	MF	MEX	Pedro García (on loan to Atlante, previously on loan at BUAP)
—	MF	MEX	Omar Govea (to (Portugal) Porto, previously on loan)
—	MF	ARG	Cristian Pellerano (on loan to Tapachula, previously on loan at Morelia)
—	FW	MEX	Antonio López (on loan to UAEM, previously on loan at Atlante)
—	FW	MEX	Martín Zúñiga (on loan to Chiapas, previously on loan at Sinaloa)

=== Atlas ===
In: Note: Flags indicate national team as defined under FIFA eligibility rules; some limited exceptions apply. Players may hold more than one non-FIFA nationality.

No.	Pos.	Nation	Player
2	DF	COL	Jaine Barreiro (from (Colombia) Santa Fe)
3	DF	COL	Leiton Jiménez (from Tijuana)
6	MF	MEX	Carlos Treviño (loan return from Venados)
10	FW	MEX	Jahir Barraza (loan return from Necaxa)
11	FW	PAR	Luis Nery Caballero (loan return from (Paraguay) Olimpia)
12	DF	MEX	Daniel Arreola (on loan from Morelia)
13	MF	MEX	Javier Salas (on loan from Sinaloa)
14	MF	MEX	Luis Reyes (loan return from Tampico Madero)
18	MF	MEX	Luis Robles (loan return from Puebla)
19	MF	MEX	Flavio Santos (loan return from Puebla)
20	MF	MEX	Santiago San Román (on loan from Oaxaca)
22	MF	MEX	Cándido Ramírez (on loan from Monterrey)
23	MF	URU	Christian Tabó (loan return from (Uruguay) Nacional)
27	DF	MEX	José Madueña (re-loan from Tijuana)
289	DF	MEX	Diego Barbosa (loan return from Venados)

Out: Note: Flags indicate national team as defined under FIFA eligibility rules; some limited exceptions apply. Players may hold more than one non-FIFA nationality.

No.	Pos.	Nation	Player
3	DF	MEX	Giovanni León (on loan to Coras)
5	DF	ARG	Walter Kannemann (to (Brazil) Grêmio)
11	FW	COL	Franco Arizala (to Puebla)
14	FW	MEX	Daniel Hernández (on loan to Sinaloa)
15	MF	MEX	Alfonso González (to Monterrey)
16	MF	URU	Egidio Arévalo Ríos (loan return to UANL)
18	MF	MEX	Dieter Villalpando (loan return to Pachuca)
20	MF	MEX	Julio Nava (loan return to Chiapas)
22	MF	MEX	Pablo Mascareñas (released)
23	DF	PAN	Felipe Baloy (loan return to Morelia)
24	MF	MEX	Ángel Gaspar (on loan to Atlante)
25	FW	ARG	Gonzalo Bergessio (to (Argentina) San Lorenzo)
26	MF	MEX	Juan Carlos Medina (to Tijuana)
100	DF	MEX	Carlos Arreola (on loan to Tampico Madero)
107	DF	MEX	Daniel Obledo (on loan to UAT)
—	GK	MEX	Jesús Gallardo (on loan to UAT, previously on loan at Necaxa)
—	GK	CHI	Miguel Pinto (to (Chile) O'Higgins, previously on loan at Tapachula)
—	DF	MEX	Jesús Paganoni (to Veracruz, previously on loan)
—	DF	ARG	Facundo Erpen (re-loan to Morelia)
—	DF	MEX	Enrique Pérez (re-loan to Morelia)
—	DF	MEX	Juan Carlos Valenzuela (re-loan to Tijuana)
—	MF	MEX	Lucas Ayala (re-loan to UAT)
—	MF	MEX	Ricardo Bocanegra (re-loan to UAT)
—	MF	CHI	Rodrigo Millar (re-loan to Morelia)
—	MF	MEX	Luis Télles (re-loan to U. de G.)
—	MF	MEX	Juan Pablo Vigón (on loan to Tapachula, previously on loan at Chiapas)
—	MF	MEX	Juan de Dios Hernández (to (Costa Rica) Alajuelense, previously on loan at Tapachula)
—	MF	MEX	Julio Betancio (released, previously on loan at Sonora)
—	MF	MEX	Carlos Nava (on loan to Oaxaca, previously on loan at Tampico Madero)
—	MF	MEX	Saúl Villalobos (on loan to Venados, previously on loan at Tlaxcala)

=== Chiapas ===
In: Note: Flags indicate national team as defined under FIFA eligibility rules; some limited exceptions apply. Players may hold more than one non-FIFA nationality.

No.	Pos.	Nation	Player
1	GK	ARG	Federico Crivelli (from (Argentina) Temperley)
2	DF	COL	Brayan Angulo (from (Bulgaria) Ludogorets Razgrad)
5	MF	URU	Egidio Arévalo Ríos (from UANL)
7	MF	MEX	Luis Ángel Mendoza (from Santos Laguna)
10	MF	PAR	Jonathan Fabbro (from (Paraguay) Cerro Porteño)
11	FW	ECU	José Ayoví (on loan from Sinaloa)
12	GK	CHI	Mauricio Viana (from (Chile) Santiago Wanderers)
13	DF	COL	Carlos Valencia (from (Colombia) Millonarios)
15	DF	BRA	Bruno Pires (loan return from Tapachula)
16	MF	MEX	Hibert Ruíz (on loan from Morelia)
17	MF	MEX	Alonso Escoboza (from Tijuana)
18	MF	MEX	Dieter Villalpando (on loan from Pachuca)
19	FW	MEX	Javier Orozco (on loan from Santos Laguna)
22	GK	MEX	Liborio Sánchez (on loan from Querétaro)
23	FW	MEX	Martín Zúñiga (on loan from América)
24	DF	PAR	Juan Patiño (on loan from (Paraguay) Guaraní)
25	MF	BRA	Rafinha (from (Brazil) Atlético Paranaense)
26	MF	URU	Felipe Rodríguez (on loan from (Uruguay) El Tanque Sisley)
27	MF	MEX	Julio Nava (loan return from Atlas)
28	FW	URU	Carlos Núñez (on loan from (Uruguay) Liverpool Montevideo)
29	FW	BRA	Derley (on loan from (Portugal) Benfica)

Out: Note: Flags indicate national team as defined under FIFA eligibility rules; some limited exceptions apply. Players may hold more than one non-FIFA nationality.

No.	Pos.	Nation	Player
1	GK	MEX	Jorge Villalpando (retired)
2	DF	ARG	Javier Muñoz Mustafá (released)
6	MF	CHI	Francisco Silva (to Cruz Azul)
7	FW	ARG	Alexis Canelo (on loan to Puebla)
10	FW	ARG	Silvio Romero (to América)
11	MF	BRA	Danilinho (loan return to Querétaro)
12	GK	MEX	César Lozano (retired)
13	MF	MEX	Julio Gómez (loan return to Pachuca)
14	FW	MEX	Luis Loroña (loan return to Querétaro)
18	FW	COL	Avilés Hurtado (to Tijuana)
19	FW	MEX	Daniel González (loan return to Toluca)
22	MF	MEX	Juan Pablo Vigón (loan return to Atlas)
24	DF	MEX	Luis Rodríguez (to UANL)
28	DF	MEX	David Andrade (to Santos Laguna)
32	FW	MEX	Ricardo Cruz (to América)
33	MF	MEX	Daniel Jiménez (on loan to Tapachula)
35	MF	ARG	Emiliano Armenteros (to Santos Laguna)
95	DF	MEX	Ángelo Costanzo (on loan to Tapachula)
281	FW	MEX	Francisco Zorrilla (on loan to Tapachula)
—	GK	MEX	Alfredo Frausto (on loan to Tapachula, previously on loan at Sinaloa)
—	DF	MEX	Carlos Utrilla (released, previously on loan at Tapachula)
—	MF	USA	Gabriel Farfán (to (United States) Miami, previously on loan at (United States) New York Cosmos)
—	MF	CHI	Mathías Vidangossy (on loan to (Chile) Palestino, previously on loan at UNAM)
—	MF	MEX	César Villaluz (on loan to Celaya, previously on loan at Atl. San Luis)
—	MF	URU	Fernando Arismendi (on loan to Celaya, previously on loan at Tapachula)
—	FW	MEX	Darío Carreño (re-loan to Tapachula)
—	FW	CHI	Isaac Díaz (on loan to (Paraguay) Sol de América, previously on loan at Tapachula)
—	FW	MEX	Mauricio Romero (on loan to Zacatepec, previously on loan at Venados)

=== Cruz Azul ===
In: Note: Flags indicate national team as defined under FIFA eligibility rules; some limited exceptions apply. Players may hold more than one non-FIFA nationality.

No.	Pos.	Nation	Player
5	MF	CHI	Francisco Silva (from Chiapas)
6	DF	ARG	Julián Velázquez (on loan from (Italy) Palermo)
11	FW	ARG	Jonatan Cristaldo (from (Brazil) Palmeiras)
16	DF	MEX	Adrián Aldrete (from Santos Laguna)
26	DF	CHI	Enzo Roco (from (Spain) Espanyol)
27	FW	PAR	Jorge Benítez (from (Greece) Olympiacos, previously on loan)
28	DF	MEX	Jesús García (from Sinaloa)
29	FW	MEX	Erick Torres (on loan from (United States) Houston Dynamo)

Out: Note: Flags indicate national team as defined under FIFA eligibility rules; some limited exceptions apply. Players may hold more than one non-FIFA nationality.

No.	Pos.	Nation	Player
2	DF	MEX	Fausto Pinto (on loan to BUAP)
5	DF	BRA	Fábio Santos (to (Brazil) Atlético Mineiro)
6	MF	MEX	Gerardo Torrado (to (United States) Indy Eleven)
8	MF	ESP	Marc Crosas (on loan to (Spain) Tenerife)
16	DF	MEX	Rogelio Chávez (to (Peru) Melgar)
17	DF	PAR	Silvio Borjas (on loan to (Paraguay) Capiatá)
26	FW	MEX	Juan González (released)
30	FW	MEX	Vicente Matías Vuoso (to (Argentina) Talleres)
78	MF	MEX	Raúl Vidal (on loan to (Costa Rica) Municipal Liberia)
92	DF	MEX	Jesús Henestrosa (on loan to Oaxaca)
96	MF	MEX	Ángel Chavarría (on loan to U. de C.)
103	FW	MEX	Moisés Hipólito (on loan to UAEM)
138	DF	MEX	Manuel Madrid (on loan to U. de C.)
—	GK	MEX	Jafet Camou (on loan to U. de C., previously on loan at Murciélagos)
—	GK	MEX	Javier Caso (re-loan to Zacatepec)
—	GK	MEX	Yosgart Gutiérrez (re-loan to Necaxa)
—	GK	MEX	Óscar Pérez (re-loan to Pachuca)
—	DF	MEX	Horacio Cervantes (re-loan to Veracruz)
—	DF	MEX	Francisco Flores (on loan to Coras, previously on loan at Pachuca)
—	MF	MEX	Xavier Báez (to Necaxa, previously on loan)
—	MF	MEX	Alejandro Castro (to UNAM, previously on loan)
—	MF	MEX	Héctor Gutiérrez (re-loan to Zacatepec)
—	MF	MEX	Omar Mendoza (re-loan to Zacatepec)
—	MF	BRA	Lucas Silva (on loan to Juárez, previously on loan at Pachuca)
—	FW	MEX	Jesús Lara (re-loan to Zacatepec)
—	FW	MEX	Julio Pardini (re-loan to Tapachula)
—	FW	PAR	Roque Santa Cruz (to (Paraguay) Olimpia, previously on loan at (Spain) Málaga)
—	FW	ARG	Pablo Torres (on loan to Sinaloa, previously on loan at Sonora)
—	FW	MEX	Ismael Valadéz (on loan to U. de G., previously on loan at Tapachula)

=== Guadalajara ===
In: Note: Flags indicate national team as defined under FIFA eligibility rules; some limited exceptions apply. Players may hold more than one non-FIFA nationality.

No.	Pos.	Nation	Player
6	DF	MEX	Edwin Hernández (from León, previously on loan)
9	FW	MEX	Alan Pulido (from (Greece) Olympiacos)
18	MF	MEX	Néstor Calderón (on loan from Santos Laguna)
19	FW	MEX	Marco Bueno (on loan from Pachuca)
23	MF	MEX	José Juan Vázquez (from León)
29	FW	USA	Alex Zendejas (from (United States) Dallas)
30	GK	MEX	Rodolfo Cota (re-loan from Pachuca)
35	FW	MEX	Daniel Ríos (loan return from Coras)
82	FW	MEX	Daniel González (on loan from Toluca)

Out: Note: Flags indicate national team as defined under FIFA eligibility rules; some limited exceptions apply. Players may hold more than one non-FIFA nationality.

No.	Pos.	Nation	Player
9	FW	MEX	Omar Bravo (to (United States) Carolina RailHawks)
10	MF	MEX	Ángel Reyna (to Celaya)
13	DF	MEX	Carlos Salcedo (on loan to (Italy) Fiorentina)
15	DF	MEX	Raúl López (to Pachuca)
18	MF	MEX	Giovani Hernández (on loan to Coras)
19	FW	MEX	Michel Vázquez (loan return to BUAP)
20	MF	MEX	Israel Castro (to (Spain) Toledo)
21	MF	MEX	David Ramírez (to Pachuca)
32	MF	MEX	Giovani Casillas (on loan to Tampico Madero)
82	DF	MEX	Jorge Parra (on loan to Coras)
83	FW	MEX	Marco Granados (on loan to Coras)
85	MF	MEX	Fernando González (on loan to Coras)
90	MF	MEX	William Guzmán (on loan to Coras)
—	GK	MEX	Sergio Arias (on loan to Sonora, previously on loan at BUAP)
—	GK	MEX	Víctor Hugo Hernández (re-loan to Coras)
—	DF	MEX	Kristian Álvarez (re-loan to Santos Laguna)
—	DF	MEX	Abraham Coronado (on loan to U. de C., previously on loan at Coras)
—	DF	MEX	Omar Esparza (released, previously on loan at Pachuca)
—	DF	MEX	Mario Orozco (re-loan to Coras)
—	DF	MEX	Édgar Solís (released, previously on loan at Celaya)
—	DF	MEX	Luis Solorio (re-loan to Coras)
—	DF	MEX	Néstor Vidrio (on loan to Juárez, previously on loan at Sinaloa)
—	MF	MEX	Fernando Arce (retired, previously on loan at Sinaloa)
—	MF	MEX	Jorge Enríquez (on loan to Coras, previously on loan at León)
—	MF	MEX	Antonio Gallardo (released, previously on loan at Necaxa)
—	MF	MEX	Víctor Guzmán (re-loan to Pachuca)
—	MF	MEX	Diego Hernández (on loan to Coras, previously on loan at Atl. San Luis)
—	MF	MEX	Édgar Mejía (re-loan to Juárez)
—	MF	MEX	Sergio Nápoles (on loan to Coras, previously on loan at Venados)
—	MF	MEX	David Toledo (re-loan to Puebla)

=== León ===
In: Note: Flags indicate national team as defined under FIFA eligibility rules; some limited exceptions apply. Players may hold more than one non-FIFA nationality.

No.	Pos.	Nation	Player
2	DF	MEX	Efraín Velarde (re-loan from Monterrey)
9	FW	ARG	Germán Cano (re-loan from Pachuca)
11	MF	COL	Andrés Andrade (from América)
13	MF	COL	Alexander Mejía (from Monterrey)
15	DF	MEX	Carlos Guzmán (on loan from Morelia)
24	DF	MEX	Osvaldo Rodríguez (on loan from Pachuca)
26	MF	MEX	Christian Valdéz (from Morelia)

Out: Note: Flags indicate national team as defined under FIFA eligibility rules; some limited exceptions apply. Players may hold more than one non-FIFA nationality.

No.	Pos.	Nation	Player
11	FW	MEX	Marco Bueno (loan return to Pachuca)
15	MF	MEX	Jorge Enríquez (loan return to Guadalajara)
19	DF	MEX	Jonny Magallón (to (Argentina) Lanús)
23	MF	MEX	José Juan Vázquez (to Guadalajara)
31	MF	ECU	Jonathan Gonzáles (on loan to (Ecuador) Independiente)
—	DF	MEX	Luis Delgado (re-loan to Zacatecas)
—	DF	MEX	Edwin Hernández (to Guadalajara, previously on loan)
—	DF	MEX	Arturo Ortíz (re-loan to Zacatecas)
—	MF	ECU	Marcos Caicedo (on loan to (Ecuador) Barcelona, previously on loan at Zacatecas)
—	MF	BRA	Derley (to (Brazil) Santa Cruz, previously on loan at Juárez)
—	MF	COL	Eisner Loboa (to (Brazil) América Mineiro, previously on loan at Morelia)
—	MF	USA	Marco Vidal (on loan to Veracruz, previously on loan at Atl. San Luis)

=== Monterrey ===
In: Note: Flags indicate national team as defined under FIFA eligibility rules; some limited exceptions apply. Players may hold more than one non-FIFA nationality.

No.	Pos.	Nation	Player
4	DF	PAR	Iván Piris (from (Italy) Udinese)
11	FW	HON	Alberth Elis (from (Honduras) Olimpia)
14	MF	MEX	Alfonso González (from Atlas)
15	DF	ARG	José María Basanta (from (Italy) Fiorentina, previously on loan)
16	MF	PAR	Celso Ortiz (from (Netherlands) AZ)
18	MF	MEX	César de la Peña (loan return from Oaxaca)
20	DF	ECU	Walter Ayoví (re-loan from Sinaloa)
22	GK	ECU	Alexander Domínguez (from (Ecuador) LDU Quito)
23	MF	COL	Yimmi Chará (loan return from Sinaloa)

Out: Note: Flags indicate national team as defined under FIFA eligibility rules; some limited exceptions apply. Players may hold more than one non-FIFA nationality.

No.	Pos.	Nation	Player
4	DF	MEX	Ricardo Osorio (retired)
11	MF	MEX	Pablo Barrera (to UNAM)
14	DF	MEX	Bernardo Hernández (on loan to Tampico Madero)
16	MF	MEX	Cándido Ramírez (on loan to Atlas)
18	MF	ARG	Neri Cardozo (on loan to Querétaro)
23	GK	MEX	Juan de Dios Ibarra (to Puebla)
34	DF	MEX	Miguel Herrera (loan return to Pachuca)
89	MF	MEX	Obed Martínez (on loan to Juárez)
285	DF	MEX	Carlos Ortega (on loan to U. de C.)
292	MF	MEX	Ían Arellano (on loan to Juárez)
—	GK	MEX	Jesús Dautt (on loan to Atlante, previously on loan at Cancún)
—	DF	MEX	Arturo Alvarado (re-loan to Zacatepec)
—	DF	MEX	Alejandro Berber (on loan to Zacatepec, previously on loan at Veracruz)
—	DF	MEX	Leobardo Siqueiros (released, previously on loan at Juárez)
—	DF	MEX	Dárvin Chávez (released, previously on loan at Veracruz)
—	DF	MEX	Pierre Ibarra (on loan to UAT, previously on loan at Murciélagos)
—	DF	MEX	Severo Meza (on loan to Necaxa, previously on loan at Sinaloa)
—	DF	MEX	Héctor Morales (on loan to Tapachula, previously on loan at Juárez)
—	DF	MEX	David Stringel (on loan to Atlante, previously on loan at Juárez)
—	DF	MEX	Efraín Velarde (re-loan to León)
—	MF	MEX	Gael Acosta (re-loan to UAT)
—	MF	MEX	Alejandro García (re-loan to UAEM)
—	MF	COL	Alexander Mejía (to León, previously on loan at (Colombia) Atlético Nacional)
—	MF	MEX	Gerardo Moreno (on loan to Tampico Madero, previously on loan at UAT)
—	MF	MEX	Marvin Piñón (to U. de C., previously on loan)
—	FW	MEX	Othoniel Arce (on loan to Sonora, previously on loan at Atl. San Luis)
—	FW	MEX	Omar Arellano (on loan to U. de G., previously on loan at Toluca)
—	FW	ECU	Marlon de Jesús (on loan to (Portugal) Arouca, previously on loan at (Ecuador) El Nacional)
—	FW	MEX	Luis Madrigal (on loan to Zacatecas, previously on loan at Querétaro)
—	FW	COL	Wilson Morelo (to Pachuca, previously on loan at Sinaloa)
—	FW	MEX	Sergio Soto (re-loan to U. de C.)

=== Morelia ===
In: Note: Flags indicate national team as defined under FIFA eligibility rules; some limited exceptions apply. Players may hold more than one non-FIFA nationality.

No.	Pos.	Nation	Player
2	DF	MEX	Enrique Pérez (re-loan from Atlas)
4	DF	MEX	Hugo Rodríguez (on loan from Pachuca)
5	DF	ARG	Facundo Erpen (re-loan from Atlas)
6	MF	MEX	David Cabrera (on loan from UNAM)
7	MF	MEX	Diego Mejía (on loan from Sinaloa)
8	MF	MEX	Juan Pablo Rodríguez (re-loan from Santos Laguna)
9	FW	PER	Raúl Ruidíaz (from (Peru) Universitario)
14	FW	ECU	Cristian Penilla (on loan from Pachuca)
15	DF	CHI	Sebastián Vegas (from (Chile) Audax Italiano)
19	MF	CHI	Diego Valdés (from (Chile) Audax Italiano)
20	MF	CHI	Rodrigo Millar (re-loan from Atlas)
21	GK	MEX	Yair Urbina (on loan from UANL)

Out: Note: Flags indicate national team as defined under FIFA eligibility rules; some limited exceptions apply. Players may hold more than one non-FIFA nationality.

No.	Pos.	Nation	Player
7	FW	PAR	Pablo Velázquez (loan return to Toluca)
16	MF	ARG	Cristian Pellerano (loan return to América)
19	MF	COL	Eisner Loboa (loan return to León)
21	DF	MEX	Érick Aguirre (to Pachuca)
22	MF	MEX	Armando Zamorano (on loan to Querétaro)
84	DF	USA	Cristian Cruz (on loan to U. de C.)
—	GK	MEX	Cirilo Saucedo (loan return to Tijuana)
—	GK	MEX	Israel Villaseñor (re-loan to Puebla)
—	DF	MEX	Daniel Arreola (on loan to Atlas, previously on loan at Sinaloa)
—	DF	PAN	Felipe Baloy (to (Colombia) Rionegro Águilas, previously on loan at Atlas)
—	DF	MEX	Carlos Guzmán (on loan to León, previously on loan at Tijuana)
—	DF	MEX	Rodrigo Godínez (released, previously on loan at Veracruz)
—	DF	MEX	Joel Huiqui (re-loan to Tapachula)
—	DF	MEX	Éder Morales (on loan to (Costa Rica) Belén, previously on loan at Oaxaca)
—	DF	MEX	Christian Ocaña (on loan to U. de C., previously on loan at Cancún)
—	DF	MEX	Luis Silva (released, previously on loan at Atlante)
—	DF	ARG	Marco Torsiglieri (to (Argentina) Rosario Central)
—	MF	MEX	Julio Atilano (on loan to UAT)
—	MF	MEX	Víctor Guajardo (on loan to Zacatepec, previously on loan at Coras)
—	MF	MEX	Hibert Ruíz (on loan to Chiapas, previously on loan at UNAM)
—	MF	MEX	Christian Valdéz (to León, previously on loan at Puebla)
—	FW	MEX	Marcelo Aguas (to (Guatemala) Deportivo Carchá, previously on loan at Murciélagos)
—	FW	MEX	Óscar Fernández (on loan to Oaxaca, previously on loan at Necaxa)
—	FW	MEX	Éver Guzmán (re-loan to UAT)

=== Necaxa ===
In: Note: Flags indicate national team as defined under FIFA eligibility rules; some limited exceptions apply. Players may hold more than one non-FIFA nationality.

No.	Pos.	Nation	Player
1	GK	ARG	Marcelo Barovero (from (Argentina) River Plate)
4	DF	MEX	Jesús Chávez (on loan from Tijuana)
5	DF	ARG	Fernando Meza (from (Chile) Palestino)
8	MF	MEX	Xavier Báez (from Cruz Azul, previously on loan)
10	FW	URU	Diego Riolfo (from (Uruguay) Montevideo Wanderers)
16	MF	CHI	Manuel Iturra (from (Italy) Udinese)
17	FW	MEX	Alejandro Díaz (on loan from América)
19	FW	ARG	Claudio Riaño (from (Argentina) Unión de Santa Fe)
20	MF	VEN	Jesús Gómez (re-loan from Sinaloa)
21	FW	ARG	Fabián Espíndola (from (Canada) Vancouver Whitecaps)
22	MF	CHI	Edson Puch (from (Ecuador) LDU Quito)
25	GK	MEX	Yosgart Gutiérrez (re-loan from Cruz Azul)
26	DF	MEX	Jairo González (on loan from U. de G.)
28	DF	MEX	Severo Meza (on loan from Monterrey)

Out: Note: Flags indicate national team as defined under FIFA eligibility rules; some limited exceptions apply. Players may hold more than one non-FIFA nationality.

No.	Pos.	Nation	Player
4	DF	MEX	Luis Padilla (on loan to Celaya)
6	MF	MEX	Antonio Gallardo (loan return to Guadalajara)
10	FW	MEX	Óscar Fernández (loan return to Morelia)
12	DF	MEX	Carlos Ramos (loan return to Celaya)
14	FW	MEX	Kevin Chaurand (loan return to Celaya)
16	DF	MEX	Alan Mendoza (loan return to UNAM)
17	FW	MEX	Jahir Barraza (loan return to Atlas)
21	GK	MEX	Jesús Gallardo (loan return to Atlas)
22	MF	MEX	Edgar Alaffita (loan return to Atl. San Luis)
24	MF	USA	Benji Joya (loan return to Santos Laguna)
—	MF	MEX	Carlos Hurtado (on loan to UAT, previously on loan at Zacatepec)
—	MF	MEX	Luis Pérez (on loan to BUAP, previously on loan at Sonora)

=== Pachuca ===
In: Note: Flags indicate national team as defined under FIFA eligibility rules; some limited exceptions apply. Players may hold more than one non-FIFA nationality.

No.	Pos.	Nation	Player
5	MF	MEX	Víctor Guzmán (re-loan from Guadalajara)
6	DF	MEX	Raúl López (from Guadalajara)
9	FW	BRA	Mateus Gonçalves (from Coras)
19	FW	COL	Wilson Morelo (from Monterrey)
21	GK	MEX	Óscar Pérez (re-loan from Cruz Azul)
25	MF	MEX	David Ramírez (from Guadalajara)
26	DF	MEX	Érick Aguirre (from Morelia)

Out: Note: Flags indicate national team as defined under FIFA eligibility rules; some limited exceptions apply. Players may hold more than one non-FIFA nationality.

No.	Pos.	Nation	Player
2	DF	MEX	Francisco Flores (loan return to Cruz Azul)
3	DF	COL	Aquivaldo Mosquera (to (Colombia) Deportivo Cali)
4	DF	MEX	Hugo Rodríguez (on loan to Morelia)
6	DF	MEX	Omar Esparza (loan return to Guadalajara)
9	FW	ARG	Ariel Nahuelpán (to (Brazil) Internacional)
14	MF	MEX	Steven Almeida (on loan to (Chile) Everton)
19	FW	PAR	Gustavo Ramírez (loan return to Zacatecas)
22	MF	BRA	Lucas Silva (loan return to Cruz Azul)
25	MF	MEX	Manuel Pérez (loan return to UNAM)
26	MF	MEX	Héctor Mascorro (on loan to Zacatecas)
28	GK	MEX	Rafael Ramírez (loan return to Zacatecas)
31	MF	MEX	Iván Ochoa (on loan to (Chile) Everton)
34	DF	MEX	Osvaldo Rodríguez (on loan to León)
285	MF	MEX	Miguel Tapias (on loan to Zacatecas)
300	MF	MEX	Luis Hernández (on loan to U. de C.)
337	MF	MEX	Nahum Gómez (on loan to (Chile) Everton)
—	GK	MEX	Rodolfo Cota (re-loan to Guadalajara)
—	GK	MEX	Carlos Velázquez (on loan to (Chile) Everton, previously on loan at Zacatecas)
—	DF	MEX	Miguel Herrera (on loan to UANL, previously on loan at Monterrey)
—	DF	MEX	Marco Pérez (on loan to BUAP, previously on loan at Zacatecas)
—	DF	MEX	Abraham Torres Nilo (re-loan to UAEM)
—	MF	MEX	Fernando Cortés (on loan to Oaxaca, previously on loan at Murciélagos)
—	MF	MEX	Juan Pablo Fassi (re-loan to Puebla)
—	MF	MEX	Julio Gómez (on loan to Coras, previously on loan at Chiapas)
—	DF	MEX	Mauro Laínez (re-loan to Zacatecas)
—	MF	MEX	Juan Carlos Silva (on loan to UAT, previously on loan at Murciélagos)
—	MF	MEX	Dieter Villalpando (on loan to Chiapas, previously on loan at Atlas)
—	FW	MEX	Marco Bueno (on loan to Guadalajara, previously on loan at León)
—	FW	ARG	Germán Cano (re-loan to León)
—	FW	MEX	Guillermo Martínez (on loan to Coras, previously on loan at BUAP)
—	FW	COL	John Pajoy (on loan to (Colombia) Deportivo Cali, previously on loan at (Argentina) Talleres)
—	FW	ECU	Cristian Penilla (on loan to Morelia, previously on loan at (Ecuador) Barcelona)

=== Puebla ===
In: Note: Flags indicate national team as defined under FIFA eligibility rules; some limited exceptions apply. Players may hold more than one non-FIFA nationality.

No.	Pos.	Nation	Player
1	GK	MEX	Israel Villaseñor (re-loan from Morelia)
6	MF	URU	Pablo Míguez (from (Argentina) Olimpo)
7	MF	MEX	Emilio Orrantía (re-loan from Santos Laguna)
8	FW	COL	Franco Arizala (from Atlas)
14	MF	MEX	Juan Pablo Fassi (re-loan from Pachuca)
16	MF	MEX	David Toledo (re-loan from Guadalajara)
21	DF	MEX	Adrián Cortés (loan return from Tapachula)
23	GK	MEX	Juan de Dios Ibarra (on loan from Monterrey)
25	FW	ARG	Alexis Canelo (on loan from Chiapas)
26	DF	ARG	Damián Schmidt (on loan from (Argentina) Racing)
28	MF	MEX	Francisco Torres (re-loan from Santos Laguna)

Out: Note: Flags indicate national team as defined under FIFA eligibility rules; some limited exceptions apply. Players may hold more than one non-FIFA nationality.

No.	Pos.	Nation	Player
8	MF	MEX	Luis Robles (loan return to Atlas)
19	MF	MEX	Flavio Santos (loan return to Atlas)
21	DF	URU	Ramón Arias (loan return to (Uruguay) Defensor Sporting)
23	MF	MEX	Christian Valdéz (loan return to Morelia)
26	DF	MEX	Roberto Juárez (released)
27	DF	MEX	Alberto Acosta (loan return to UANL)
30	GK	USA	Austin Guerrero (released)
—	DF	MEX	Aldo Polo (on loan to Sonora, previously on loan at Venados)
—	DF	MEX	Mario Quezada (on loan to BUAP, previously on loan at Toluca)
—	MF	MEX	Alberto Medina (on loan to Coras, previously on loan at Oaxaca)

=== Querétaro ===
In: Note: Flags indicate national team as defined under FIFA eligibility rules; some limited exceptions apply. Players may hold more than one non-FIFA nationality.

No.	Pos.	Nation	Player
10	FW	CHI	Patricio Rubio (loan return from Universidad de Chile)
20	FW	COL	Andrés Rentería (from Santos Laguna)
24	MF	MEX	Armando Zamorano (on loan from Morelia)
29	MF	ARG	Neri Cardozo (on loan from Monterrey)

Out: Note: Flags indicate national team as defined under FIFA eligibility rules; some limited exceptions apply. Players may hold more than one non-FIFA nationality.

No.	Pos.	Nation	Player
5	DF	MEX	Yasser Corona (to Tijuana)
10	MF	MEX	Sinha (loan return to Toluca)
27	FW	MEX	Luis Madrigal (loan return to Monterrey)
84	MF	MEX	Diego Andrade (on loan to Sonora)
92	MF	MEX	Hugo Cisneros (on loan to Sonora)
100	DF	MEX	Abel Vega (on loan to Sonora)
101	DF	MEX	José Saavedra (on loan to Sonora)
108	GK	MEX	Joel Gutiérrez (on loan to Sonora)
110	MF	MEX	Erik Pedroza (on loan to Sonora)
285	DF	MEX	Martín Orozco (on loan to Sonora)
293	MF	USA	Josué Soto (on loan to Sonora)
309	MF	MEX	Cristian Cruz (on loan to Sonora)
—	GK	MEX	Luis Manuel García (on loan to Toluca, previously on loan at Coras)
—	GK	MEX	Liborio Sánchez (on loan to Chiapas, previously on loan at Toluca)
—	DF	MEX	Christian Pérez (released, previously on loan at Toluca)
—	DF	MEX	Manuel López Mondragón (released, previously on loan at UAT)
—	DF	MEX	Onay Pineda (released, previously on loan at Tapachula)
—	DF	MEX	Raúl Rico (released, previously on loan at Sonora)
—	MF	BRA	Danilinho (on loan to (Brazil) Fluminense, previously on loan at Chiapas)
—	MF	MEX	Amaury Escoto (to (Guatemala) Suchitepéquez, previously on loan at Tapachula)
—	MF	MEX	Jorge Gastélum (on loan to Sonora, previously on loan at Coras)
—	MF	MEX	Emilio López (to (Nicaragua) Real Estelí, previously on loan at Veracruz)
—	MF	MEX	Juan Carlos López (released, previously on loan at Coras)
—	MF	MEX	Gerardo Espinoza (retired, previously on loan at BUAP)
—	MF	MEX	Guillermo Rojas (on loan to Tapachula, previously on loan at Sinaloa)
—	MF	MEX	Alan Zamora (re-loan to Veracruz)
—	FW	MEX	Luis Loroña (on loan to Sonora, previously on loan at Chiapas)

=== Santos Laguna ===
In: Note: Flags indicate national team as defined under FIFA eligibility rules; some limited exceptions apply. Players may hold more than one non-FIFA nationality.

No.	Pos.	Nation	Player
3	DF	MEX	Kristian Álvarez (re-loan from Guadalajara)
7	MF	MEX	Gael Sandoval (loan return from Juárez)
8	FW	COL	Mauricio Cuero (from (Spain) Levante)
13	FW	URU	Jonathan Rodríguez (from (Portugal) Benfica)
17	MF	COL	Fredy Hinestroza (from (Colombia) La Equidad)
18	DF	MEX	David Andrade (from Chiapas)
20	DF	COL	Andrés Murillo (on loan from (Colombia) La Equidad)
23	MF	ARG	Emiliano Armenteros (from Chiapas)

Out: Note: Flags indicate national team as defined under FIFA eligibility rules; some limited exceptions apply. Players may hold more than one non-FIFA nationality.

No.	Pos.	Nation	Player
7	FW	COL	Andrés Rentería (to Querétaro)
8	MF	ARG	Diego González (to (Argentina) Racing)
9	MF	MEX	Luis Ángel Mendoza (to Chiapas)
11	MF	MEX	Néstor Calderón (on loan to Guadalajara)
16	DF	MEX	Adrián Aldrete (to Cruz Azul)
27	FW	MEX	Javier Orozco (on loan to Chiapas)
81	DF	MEX	Christian Ramírez (on loan to Tampico Madero)
86	MF	MEX	Óscar Arce (on loan to Tampico Madero)
87	DF	MEX	Óscar Bernal (on loan to Tampico Madero)
94	GK	MEX	Jorge Alvarado (on loan to Tampico Madero)
99	MF	MEX	Mario Rodríguez (on loan to Tampico Madero)
100	MF	MEX	Julio Salas (on loan to Tampico Madero)
104	FW	URU	Maicol Cabrera (on loan to Tampico Madero)
105	MF	MEX	Javier Que (on loan to Tampico Madero)
283	DF	MEX	Rafael Escalante (on loan to Tampico Madero)
287	MF	MEX	Herbert Robinson (on loan to Tampico Madero)
—	DF	MEX	Uriel Álvarez (on loan to Tampico Madero, previously on loan at Atl. San Luis)
—	DF	MEX	César Bernal (on loan to Tampico Madero, previously on loan at Irapuato)
—	DF	MEX	Christian Tovar (on loan to Tampico Madero, previously on loan at Zacatepec)
—	MF	MEX	Diego Esqueda (on loan to BUAP, previously on loan at Atl. San Luis)
—	MF	USA	Benji Joya (to (United States) Sporting Kansas City, previously on loan at Necaxa)
—	MF	MEX	Emilio Orrantía (re-loan to Puebla)
—	MF	MEX	Juan Pablo Rodríguez (re-loan to Morelia)
—	MF	URU	Ribair Rodríguez (re-loan to U. de G.)
—	MF	MEX	Jaime Toledo (on loan to Tampico Madero)
—	MF	MEX	Francisco Torres (re-loan to Puebla)
—	FW	HON	Júnior Lacayo (on loan to Tampico Madero, previously on loan at (Honduras) Victoria)

=== Tijuana ===
In: Note: Flags indicate national team as defined under FIFA eligibility rules; some limited exceptions apply. Players may hold more than one non-FIFA nationality.

No.	Pos.	Nation	Player
3	DF	MEX	Yasser Corona (from Querétaro)
5	MF	ARG	Guido Rodríguez (from (Argentina) River Plate)
6	DF	MEX	Juan Carlos Valenzuela (re-loan from Atlas)
9	FW	ARG	Milton Caraglio (from Sinaloa)
10	MF	ARG	Ignacio Malcorra (from (Argentina) Unión de Santa Fe)
15	DF	ARG	Damián Pérez (from (Argentina) Vélez Sarsfield)
18	FW	COL	Avilés Hurtado (from Chiapas)
19	DF	ARG	Emanuel Aguilera (from (Argentina) Independiente)
26	MF	MEX	Juan Carlos Medina (from Atlas)
30	MF	ARG	Héctor Villalba (on loan from (United States) Atlanta United)

Out: Note: Flags indicate national team as defined under FIFA eligibility rules; some limited exceptions apply. Players may hold more than one non-FIFA nationality.

No.	Pos.	Nation	Player
3	DF	ARG	Javier Gandolfi (to (Argentina) Talleres)
5	DF	MEX	Elio Castro (loan return to Sinaloa)
6	DF	MEX	José María Cárdenas (on loan to Tapachula)
9	FW	COL	Juan Pérez (loan return to (Colombia) Junior)
10	MF	MEX	Alonso Escoboza (to Chiapas)
15	DF	MEX	Carlos Guzmán (loan return to Morelia)
19	FW	MEX	Alberto García (on loan to Sinaloa)
23	MF	ARG	Gonzalo Díaz (on loan to (Argentina) Vélez Sarsfield)
30	DF	COL	Leiton Jiménez (to Atlas)
287	MF	USA	Fernando Arce, Jr. (on loan to Sinaloa)
296	DF	MEX	Christian Torres (on loan to Sinaloa)
299	MF	NGR	Mark Tanko (on loan to Sinaloa)
—	GK	MEX	Cirilo Saucedo (on loan to Juárez, previously on loan at Morelia)
—	DF	MEX	Jesús Chávez (on loan to Necaxa, previously on loan at Sinaloa)
—	DF	MEX	José Madueña (re-loan to Atlas)
—	DF	MEX	Oliver Ortíz (on loan to Sinaloa, previously on loan at U. de G.)
—	DF	MEX	Joshua Abrego (released, previously on loan at Sinaloa)
—	MF	MEX	Adolfo Domínguez (released, previously on loan at Juárez)
—	MF	USA	Stevie Rodriguez (released, previously on loan at Atlante)
—	FW	MEX	Raúl Enríquez (on loan to Juárez, previously on loan at Zacatecas)

=== Toluca ===
In: Note: Flags indicate national team as defined under FIFA eligibility rules; some limited exceptions apply. Players may hold more than one non-FIFA nationality.

No.	Pos.	Nation	Player
5	DF	CHI	Osvaldo González (from Universidad de Chile)
8	FW	BRA	Maikon Leite (from (Brazil) Palmeiras)
10	MF	MEX	Sinha (loan return from Querétaro)
14	FW	ENG	Antonio Pedroza (from (Costa Rica) Herediano)
22	GK	MEX	Luis Manuel García (on loan from Querétaro)
24	MF	ARG	Pablo Barrientos (from (Argentina) San Lorenzo)
27	MF	ARG	Rodrigo Gómez (from (Argentina) Independiente)

Out: Note: Flags indicate national team as defined under FIFA eligibility rules; some limited exceptions apply. Players may hold more than one non-FIFA nationality.

No.	Pos.	Nation	Player
5	DF	MEX	Christian Pérez (loan return to Querétaro)
8	FW	ARG	Nicolás Saucedo (loan return to UAT)
10	MF	MEX	Lucas Lobos (to (Argentina) Gimnasia)
13	MF	PER	Christian Cueva (to (Brazil) São Paulo)
14	MF	PAR	Richard Ortiz (on loan to (Paraguay) Olimpia)
22	GK	MEX	Liborio Sánchez (loan return to Querétaro)
23	FW	MEX	Omar Arellano (loan return to Monterrey)
27	DF	MEX	Mario Quezada (loan return to Puebla)
32	DF	MEX	Heriberto Vidales (loan return to UNAM)
—	DF	MEX	Héctor Acosta (on loan to Venados, previously on loan at Oaxaca)
—	DF	MEX	Carlos Galeana (re-loan to Celaya)
—	DF	MEX	Juan Carlos Morales (re-loan to UAEM)
—	MF	MEX	José Calderón (on loan to Venados, previously on loan at Tlaxcala)
—	MF	COL	Wilder Guisao (on loan to (Argentina) Racing, previously on loan at (Brazil) São Paulo)
—	MF	MEX	Arturo Tapia (re-loan to UAEM)
—	MF	MEX	Gabriel Velasco (on loan to UAEM, previously on loan at Coras)
—	FW	MEX	Daniel González (on loan to Guadalajara, previously on loan at Chiapas)
—	FW	MEX	Alexis Ochoa (re-loan to UAEM)
—	FW	PAR	Pablo Velázquez (on loan to (Paraguay) Cerro Porteño, previously on loan at Morelia)
—	FW	MEX	Raúl Nava (released, previously on loan at Zacatecas)

=== UANL ===
In: Note: Flags indicate national team as defined under FIFA eligibility rules; some limited exceptions apply. Players may hold more than one non-FIFA nationality.

No.	Pos.	Nation	Player
9	FW	FRA	Andy Delort (from (France) Caen)
13	DF	MEX	Miguel Herrera (on loan from Pachuca)
18	FW	ARG	Ismael Sosa (from UNAM)
21	DF	COL	Francisco Meza (loan return from UNAM)
23	FW	COL	Luis Quiñones (loan return from UNAM)
27	MF	MEX	Alberto Acosta (loan return from Puebla)
28	DF	MEX	Luis Rodríguez (from Chiapas)
31	MF	MEX	Luis Martínez (loan return from Juárez)
33	FW	COL	Julián Quiñones (loan return from Venados)

Out: Note: Flags indicate national team as defined under FIFA eligibility rules; some limited exceptions apply. Players may hold more than one non-FIFA nationality.

No.	Pos.	Nation	Player
9	FW	BRA	Rafael Sóbis (to (Brazil) Cruzeiro)
13	DF	MEX	Antonio Briseño (on loan to Juárez)
17	FW	CHI	Héctor Mancilla (released)
30	GK	MEX	Richard Sánchez (on loan to Tampico Madero)
32	MF	MEX	Genaro Castillo (on loan to Tampico Madero)
83	MF	MEX	Emmanuel Segura (on loan to Oaxaca)
90	DF	MEX	Ricardo Chávez (on loan to UAT)
296	MF	MEX	Aldair García (on loan to Juárez)
303	FW	MEX	Luis Cruz (on loan to Zacatepec)
—	GK	MEX	Sergio García (on loan to Juárez, previously on loan at Veracruz)
—	GK	MEX	Yair Urbina (on loan to Morelia, previously on loan at Juárez)
—	GK	MEX	Daniel Vogel (re-loan to UAT)
—	DF	MEX	Éder Borelli (re-loan to Juárez)
—	DF	ESA	Alexander Larín (on loan to (El Salvador) Alianza, previously on loan at (El Salvador) FAS)
—	DF	MEX	Nicolás Ruvalcaba (re-loan to BUAP)
—	DF	MEX	Marco Tovar (on loan to Murciélagos, previously on loan at Juárez)
—	DF	MEX	Dieter Vargas (on loan to Oaxaca, previously on loan at Tampico Madero)
—	MF	COL	Johan Arango (on loan to (Colombia) Deportivo Pasto, previously signed from (Colombia) Once Caldas)
—	MF	URU	Egidio Arévalo Ríos (to Chiapas, previously on loan at Atlas)
—	MF	MEX	Gerardo Lugo (released, previously on loan at Veracruz)
—	MF	COL	William Palacio (on loan to (Argentina) Colón, previously on loan at (Colombia) Atlético Huila)
—	MF	MEX	Alfonso Tamay (on loan to Tampico Madero, previously on loan at Tapachula)
—	FW	MEX	Emmanuel Cerda (on loan to UAEM, previously on loan at Murciélagos)
—	FW	MEX	Enrique Esqueda (released, previously on loan at Veracruz)
—	FW	ARG	Mauro Fernández (on loan to Juárez, previously signed from (Argentina) Guillermo Brown)
—	FW	COL	Carlos Ibargüen (on loan to (Colombia) Independiente Medellín, previously on loan at (Colombia) Santa Fe)
—	FW	NGR	Ikechukwu Uche (to (Spain) Gimnàstic, previously on loan at (Spain) Málaga)

=== UNAM ===
In: Note: Flags indicate national team as defined under FIFA eligibility rules; some limited exceptions apply. Players may hold more than one non-FIFA nationality.

No.	Pos.	Nation	Player
8	MF	MEX	Pablo Barrera (from Monterrey)
10	MF	ESP	Abraham (from (Spain) Espanyol)
11	FW	ESP	Saúl (from (Spain) Eibar)
12	DF	MEX	Orlando Pineda (loan return from Atl. San Luis)
18	DF	MEX	José Antonio García (loan return from Zacatepec)
21	MF	MEX	Alejandro Castro (from Cruz Azul, previously on loan)
24	FW	MEX	Santiago Palacios (from (Netherlands) Roda JC)

Out: Note: Flags indicate national team as defined under FIFA eligibility rules; some limited exceptions apply. Players may hold more than one non-FIFA nationality.

No.	Pos.	Nation	Player
8	MF	MEX	David Cabrera (on loan to Morelia)
9	FW	PAR	Dante López (to Zacatepec)
10	MF	ARG	Daniel Ludueña (on loan to (Argentina) Talleres)
14	FW	MEX	David Izazola (retired)
17	MF	MEX	Hibert Ruíz (loan return to Morelia)
18	MF	ARG	Ismael Sosa (to UANL)
19	MF	CHI	Mathías Vidangossy (loan return to Chiapas)
24	FW	COL	Luis Quiñones (loan return to UANL)
28	DF	COL	Francisco Meza (loan return to UANL)
—	DF	MEX	Alan Mendoza (on loan to Sinaloa, previously on loan at Necaxa)
—	DF	MEX	Neftalí Teja (on loan to Oaxaca, previously on loan at Tampico Madero)
—	DF	MEX	Franz Torres (re-loan to Celaya)
—	DF	MEX	Heriberto Vidales (released, previously on loan at Toluca)
—	MF	MEX	Fernando Espinosa (re-loan to Atlante)
—	FW	MEX	Manuel Pérez (to América, previously on loan at Pachuca)
—	FW	URU	Jonathan Ramis (to Zacatepec, previously on loan)

=== Veracruz ===
In: Note: Flags indicate national team as defined under FIFA eligibility rules; some limited exceptions apply. Players may hold more than one non-FIFA nationality.

No.	Pos.	Nation	Player
1	GK	PER	Pedro Gallese (from (Peru) Juan Aurich)
3	DF	ARG	Lucas Rodríguez (from (Argentina) Argentinos Juniors)
5	MF	ARG	Cristian Erbes (from (Argentina) Boca Juniors)
7	MF	MEX	Alan Zamora (re-loan from Querétaro)
12	DF	MEX	Horacio Cervantes (re-loan from Cruz Azul)
14	MF	MEX	Luis Sánchez (loan return from Venados)
15	FW	COL	Juan Pérez (on loan from (Colombia) Junior)
16	MF	URU	Rafael Acosta (from (Czech Republic) Bohemians 1905)
19	DF	ARG	Matías Cahais (from (Colombia) Independiente Medellín)
21	MF	URU	Adrián Luna (loan return from Venados)
25	MF	MEX	Jehu Chiapas (loan return from Tapachula)
26	MF	USA	Marco Vidal (on loan from León)
27	FW	ARG	Agustín Vuletich (from (Argentina) Arsenal de Sarandí)
28	DF	MEX	Jesús Paganoni (from Atlas, previously on loan)
30	MF	MEX	Francisco Rivera (on loan from América)
31	FW	MEX	Diego Bartolotta (on loan from (Malta) Birkirkara)
32	GK	MEX	José Rocchi (Free agent, last with (Uruguay) Cerro)

Out: Note: Flags indicate national team as defined under FIFA eligibility rules; some limited exceptions apply. Players may hold more than one non-FIFA nationality.

No.	Pos.	Nation	Player
4	DF	MEX	Rodrigo Godínez (loan return to Morelia)
5	DF	MEX	Dárvin Chávez (loan return to Monterrey)
14	MF	MEX	Emilio López (loan return to Querétaro)
16	FW	MEX	Enrique Esqueda (loan return to UANL)
19	FW	COL	Cristian Borja (on loan to (Colombia) América de Cali)
21	DF	MEX	Alejandro Berber (loan return to Monterrey)
25	DF	MEX	Juan Fernández (loan return to Celaya)
32	MF	MEX	Gerardo Lugo (loan return to UANL)
33	GK	MEX	Sergio García (loan return to UANL)
293	MF	MEX	Diego Chávez (on loan to Juárez)
—	GK	MEX	Leonín Pineda (on loan to UAEM, previously on loan at Atl. San Luis)
—	DF	MEX	Marco Figueroa (on loan to UAEM)
—	DF	MEX	Emmanuel Gil (re-loan to Tapachula)
—	DF	MEX	Víctor Perales (released, previously on loan at Venados)
—	DF	MEX	César Saldívar (released, previously on loan at Venados)
—	MF	BRA	Wilson Tiago (released, previously on loan at Sinaloa)
—	FW	ARG	Juan Manuel Cavallo (re-loan to Oaxaca)
—	FW	URU	Líber Quiñones (re-loan to Racing de Montevideo)

== See also ==
- 2016–17 Liga MX season
