= 2016–17 Club Puebla season =

Puebla F.C.
2016–17 season
- Chairman: Jesus Lopez Charagoy
- Manager: Ricardo Valiño (sacked Jan 30, 2017); José Cardozo
- Stadium: Estadio Cuauhtémoc
Home colours	Away colours	Third colours

The 2016–17 Puebla season was the club's 70th professional season in Mexico's top-flight football league. The season is split into two tournaments—the Torneo Apertura and the Torneo Clausura—each with identical formats and each contested by the same eighteen teams. The club also played Supercopa MX.

== First-team squad ==
Note: Flags indicate national team as defined under FIFA eligibility rules; some limited exceptions apply. Players may hold more than one non-FIFA nationality.

No.	Pos.	Nation	Player
1	GK	MEX	Israel Villaseñor (on loan from Morelia)
2	DF	URU	Robert Herrera
3	DF	MEX	Carlos Gutiérrez
5	DF	MEX	Edgar Dueñas (on loan from Toluca)
6	MF	URU	Pablo Míguez
7	DF	MEX	Emilio Orrantía (on loan from Santos Laguna)
9	MF	ARG	Mauro Cejas (on loan from Santos Laguna)
10	MF	MEX	Christian Bermúdez
12	DF	MEX	Óscar Rojas
14	MF	MEX	Juan Pablo Fassi (on loan from Pachuca)
16	MF	MEX	David Toledo (on loan from Guadalajara)
17	GK	ARG	Cristian Campestrini
18	FW	MEX	Eduardo Pérez

No.	Pos.	Nation	Player
19	FW	MEX	Jerónimo Amione
20	FW	URU	Álvaro Navarro
21	DF	MEX	Adrián Cortés
22	DF	MEX	Patricio Araujo
23	GK	MEX	Juan de Dios Ibarra (on loan from Monterrey)
25	FW	ARG	Alexis Canelo (on loan from Chiapas)
26	DF	ARG	Damián Schmidt (on loan from Racing Club)
28	MF	MEX	Francisco Torres (on loan from Santos Laguna)
29	MF	ARG	Damián Escudero
30	GK	MEX	Jesús Rodríguez
—	DF	ARG	Iván Centurión
—	MF	ARG	Gabriel Esparza (on loan from San Lorenzo)

For recent transfers, see List of Mexican football transfers winter 2016–2017.

== Regular season ==
Win Draw Loss

=== Apertura 2016 results ===
July 16, 2016 Round 1	Monterrey	1 - 1	Puebla F.C.	Monterrey, Nuevo León
19:00				Stadium: Estadio BBVA Bancomer

July 24, 2016 Round 2	Puebla F.C.	3 - 2	Club Tijuana	Puebla City, Puebla
18:00				Stadium: Estadio Cuauhtémoc

July 30, 2016 Round 3	Querétaro F.C.	2-1	Puebla F.C.	Querétaro City, Querétaro
17:00				Stadium: Estadio Corregidora

August 7, 2016 Round 4	Puebla F.C.	1 - 1	Santos Laguna	Puebla City, Puebla
20:00				Stadium: Estadio Cuauhtémoc

August 13, 2016 Round 5	Club Atlas	3 - 2	Puebla F.C.	Guadalajara, Jalisco
19:00				Stadium: Estadio Jalisco

21 August 2015 Round 6	Puebla F.C.	2 - 2	Club America	Puebla City, Puebla
18:00				Stadium: Estadio Cuauhtémoc

August 28, 2016 Round 7	Chiapas F.C.	0 - 3	Puebla F.C.	Tuxtla Gutierrez, Chiapas
17:00				Stadium: Estadio Víctor Manuel Reyna

September 11, 2016 Round 8	Puebla F.C.	0 - 2	Toluca	Puebla City, Puebla
18:00				Stadium: Estadio Cuauhtémoc

September 17, 2016 Round 9	Tigres	1 - 0	Puebla F.C.	San Nicolás de los Garza, Nuevo León
19:00				Stadium: Estadio Universitario

September 20, 2016 Round 10	Puebla F.C.	3 - 2	Veracruz	Puebla City, Puebla
2:00				Stadium: Estadio Cuauhtémoc

September 24, 2016 Round 11	C.A Morelia	3 - 2	Puebla F.C.	Morelia, Michoacan
19:00				Stadium: Estadio Morelos

2 October 2016 Round 12	Puebla F.C.	1 - 1	C.F. Pachuca	Puebla City, Puebla
18:00				Stadium: Estadio Cuauhtémoc

October 16, 2016 Round 13	Puebla F.C.	0 - 2	Puebla F.C.	Puebla City, Puebla
18:00				Stadium: Estadio Cuauhtémoc

October 22, 2016 Round 14	Cruz Azul	1 -2	Puebla F.C.	Benito Juárez, Mexico City
17:00				Stadium: Estadio Azul

October 30, 2016 Round 15	Puebla F.C.	2 -2	Club Leon	Puebla City, Puebla
18:00				Stadium: Estadio Cuauhtémoc

November 5, 2016 Round 16	Necaxa	3 - 1	Puebla F.C.	Aguascalientes City, Aguascalientes
21:00				Stadium: Estadio Victoria

November 20, 2016 Round 17	Puebla F.C.	3 - 0	Club Universidad Nacional	Puebla City, Puebla
18:00				Stadium: Estadio Cuauhtémoc

=== Goalscorers ===
Position	Nation	Name	Goals scored
1.	(Argentina) (Mexico)	Matías Alustiza	8
2.	(Uruguay)	Álvaro Navarro	6
3.	(Argentina)	Pablo Míguez	2
3.	(Mexico)	Christian Bermúdez	2
3.	(Mexico)	Édgar Dueñas	2
3.	(Argentina)	Alexis Canelo	2
4.	(Uruguay)	Robert Herrera	1
4.	(Mexico)	Jerónimo Amione	1

=== Results ===
==== Results summary ====
Overall								Home						Away					
Pld	W	D	L	GF	GA	GD	Pts	W	D	L	GF	GA	GD	W	D	L	GF	GA	GD
17	5	5	7	25	30	−5	20	2	4	3	11	16	−5	3	1	4	14	14	0

Last updated: 29 December 2016.
Source: Apertura 2016 results

== Apertura 2016 Copa MX ==
=== Group stage ===
Win Draw Loss

==== Apertura results ====
July 7, 2016 1	Querétaro F.C.	1 – 2	Puebla	Querétaro City, Querétaro, Mexico
19:00				Stadium: Estadio Corregidora

August 10, 2016 3	Puebla	2 - 1	Dorados de Sinaloa	Puebla, Puebla
19:00				Stadium: Estadio Cuauhtémoc

August 23, 2016 5	Puebla	1– 1	Querétaro F.C.	Puebla, Puebla
19:00				Stadium: Estadio Cuauhtémoc

September 13, 2016 6	Dorados de Sinaloa	0 – 1	Puebla	Culiacán, Sinaloa, Mexico
19:30				Stadium: Estadio Banorte

September 27, 2016 Quarter-finals	Puebla	3 - 2	U. de G.	Puebla, Puebla
19:00				Stadium: Estadio Cuauhtémoc

October 10, 2016 Semifinals	Puebla	0 - 2	Toluca F.C.	Puebla, Puebla
21:00				Stadium: Estadio Universitario BUAP

=== Goalscorers ===
Position	Nation	Name	Goals scored
1.	(Mexico)	Jerónimo Amione	2
2.	(Mexico)	Christian Bermúdez	1
2.	(Mexico) (Argentina)	Matías Alustiza	1
2.	(Mexico)	Sergio Ceballos	1
2.	(Colombia)	Franco Arizala	1

== 2016 ==
=== Regular season ===
Win Draw Loss

=== Clausura 2016 results ===
January 8, 2017 Round 1	Puebla F.C.	2- 5	Monterrey	Puebla City, Puebla
				Stadium: Estadio Cuauhtémoc

January 2017 Round 2	Club Tijuana	6 - 2	Puebla F.C.	Tijuana, Baja California, Mexico
:00				Stadium: Estadio Caliente

January 2016 Round 3	Puebla F.C.	0 - 0	Querétaro F.C.	Puebla City, Puebla
12:00				Stadium: Estadio Cuauhtémoc

February 2017 Round 4	Santos Laguna	0 - 0	Puebla F.C.	Torreón, Coahuila, Mexico
:00				Stadium: Estadio Corona

February 2017 Round 5	Puebla F.C.	1 - 1	Club Atlas	Puebla City, Puebla
20:00				Stadium: Estadio Cuauhtémoc

February 2017 Round 6	Club America	0 - 0	Puebla F.C.	Mexico City Mexico
:00				Stadium: Estadio Azteca

August 2017 Round 7	Puebla F.C.	3 - 0	Chiapas F.C.	Puebla City, Puebla
:00				Stadium: Estadio Cuauhtémoc

February 2017 Round 8	Deportivo Toluca F.C.	1 - 3	Puebla F.C.	Torreón, Coahuila, Mexico
:00				Stadium: Estadio Nemesio Díez

March 2017 Round 9	Puebla F.C.	0 - 3	Tigres UANL	Puebla City, Puebla
:00				Stadium: Estadio Cuauhtémoc

March 2017 Round 10	Veracruz	3 - 2	Puebla F.C.	Veracruz City, Veracruz, Mexico
:00				Stadium: Estadio Luis "Pirata" Fuente

March 2017 Round 11	Puebla F.C.	0 - 1	C.A Morelia	Puebla City, Puebla
:00				Stadium: Estadio Cuauhtémoc

April 2017 Round 12	C.F. Pachuca	0 - 0	Puebla F.C.	Pachuca, Hidalgo, Mexico
				Stadium: Estadio Hidalgo

April 2017 Round 13	C.D. Guadalajara	3 - 2	Puebla F.C.	Guadalajara, Jalisco, Mexico
				Stadium: Estadio Chivas

April 2017 Round 14	Puebla F.C.	2 - 1	Cruz Azul	Puebla City, Puebla
				Stadium: Estadio Cuauhtémoc

April 2017 Round 15	Club Leon	1 - 0	Puebla F.C.	León, Guanajuato, Mexico
				Stadium: Estadio Nou Camp

April 2017 Round 16	Puebla F.C.	1 - 0	Necaxa	Puebla City, Puebla
				Stadium: Estadio Cuauhtémoc

May 2017 Round 17	UNAM	0 - 1	Puebla F.C.	Coyoacán, Mexico City, Mexico
				Stadium: Estadio Olímpico Universitario

=== Attendance ===
Puebla's Home Attendance by round, Estadio Cuahutemoc has a sitting capacity of 51,726. |}

round	Team	Attendance	Percentage
2	C.F. Monterrey	13,338	28.13%
2	Querétaro F.C.	10,007	21.32%
2			
2			
2			
2			
2			
2			

=== Goalscorers ===
Position	Nation	Name	Goals scored
1.	(Argentina)	Alexis Canelo	4
2.	(Mexico)	Francisco Torres	2
2.	(Uruguay)	Pablo Míguez	2
3.	(Mexico)	Francisco Acuña	1
3.	(Mexico)	Patricio Araujo	1
3.	(Mexico)	Jerónimo Amione	1
3.	(Mexico)	Carlos Gutiérrez	1
3.	(Argentina)	Gabriel Esparza	1
3.	(Argentina)	Federico González	1
3.	(Mexico)	David Toledo	1

=== Results ===
==== Results summary ====
Overall								Home						Away					
Pld	W	D	L	GF	GA	GD	Pts	W	D	L	GF	GA	GD	W	D	L	GF	GA	GD
18	4	4	10	17	25	−8	16	2	2	4	8	9	−1	2	2	6	9	16	−7

Last updated: December 14, 2016.
Source: Clausura 2017 results

== Clausura 2017 Copa MX ==
Puebla FC was drawn into Group 4 of the 2017 Clausura 2017 Copa MX alongside Club Atlas and Mineros de Zacatecas.

=== Group stage ===
Win Draw Loss

==== Apertura results ====
January 17, 2017 1	C.D Mineros	1 – 1	Puebla F.C.	Zacatecas City, Zacatecas
21:00				Stadium: Estadio Francisco Villa

January 25, 2017 2	Puebla F.C.	1 – 0	Club Atlas	Puebla City, Puebla
21:00				Stadium: Estadio Cuauhtémoc

February 14, 2017 4	Puebla F.C.	1 – 0	C.D Mineros	Puebla City, Puebla
19:00				Stadium: Estadio Cuauhtémoc

February 22, 2017 5	Club Atlas	2 – 1	Puebla F.C.	Guadalajara, Jalisco
19:00				Stadium: Estadio Jalisco

March 7, 2017 R.of Sixteen	Chiapas F.C.	2 – 3	Puebla F.C.	Tuxtla Gutiérrez, Chiapas
				Stadium: Estadio Víctor Manuel Reyna

March 15, 2017 Quarterfinals	Monterrey	3 – 2	Puebla F.C.	Guadalupe, Nuevo León, Monterrey
				Stadium: Estadio BBVA Bancomer

=== Goalscorers ===
Position	Nation	Name	Goals scored
1.	(Mexico)	Jerónimo Amione	2
1.	(Argentina)	Federico González	2
1.	(Uruguay)	Álvaro Navarro	2

Álvaro Navarro
