= List of Mexican football transfers winter 2016–17 =

This is the list of Mexican football transfers of the Mexican Primera Division during the winter 2016–17 transfer window, grouped by club. It only includes football transfers related to clubs from the Liga Bancomer MX, the first division of Mexican football.

== Liga Bancomer MX ==
=== América ===
In: Note: Flags indicate national team as defined under FIFA eligibility rules; some limited exceptions apply. Players may hold more than one non-FIFA nationality.

No.	Pos.	Nation	Player
1	GK	ARG	Agustin Marchesin (from Santos Laguna)
10	FW	PAR	Cecilio Domínguez (from (Paraguay) Cerro Porteño)
25	MF	PAR	Cristian Paredes (from (Paraguay) Sol de América)
27	GK	MEX	Óscar Jiménez (from Chiapas)
310	MF	CRC	Gerson Torres (on loan from (Costa Rica) Herediano)

Out: Note: Flags indicate national team as defined under FIFA eligibility rules; some limited exceptions apply. Players may hold more than one non-FIFA nationality.

No.	Pos.	Nation	Player
1	GK	MEX	Hugo González (to Monterrey)
10	MF	PAR	Osvaldo Martínez (to Santos Laguna)
14	MF	ARG	Rubens Sambueza (to Toluca)
17	DF	USA	Ventura Alvarado (to Santos Laguna)
19	FW	MEX	Diego Pineda (on loan to Venados)
23	GK	MEX	Moisés Muñoz (on loan to Chiapas)
27	FW	MEX	Jesús Moreno (to Tampico Madero)
—	MF	ARG	Cristian Pellerano (on loan to Veracruz, previously on loan at Tapachula)
—	FW	MEX	Martín Zúñiga (on loan to Tapachula, previously on loan at Chiapas)

=== Atlas ===
In: Note: Flags indicate national team as defined under FIFA eligibility rules; some limited exceptions apply. Players may hold more than one non-FIFA nationality.

No.	Pos.	Nation	Player
9	FW	ECU	Fidel Martinez (from Pumas)
11	FW	ARG	Matias Alustiza (from Puebla)
20	MF	GHA	Clifford Aboagye (on loan from (Spain) Granada)

Out: Note: Flags indicate national team as defined under FIFA eligibility rules; some limited exceptions apply. Players may hold more than one non-FIFA nationality.

No.	Pos.	Nation	Player
9	FW	COL	Jefferson Duque (on loan to (Colombia) Deportivo Cali)
19	MF	MEX	Flavio Santos (on loan to Sinaloa)
20	MF	MEX	Santiago San Román (retired)
—	DF	MEX	Yahir Elizalde (on loan to (Panama) Alianza)
—	MF	COL	Aldo Leão Ramírez (on loan to (Colombia) Atlético Nacional)

=== Chiapas ===
In: Note: Flags indicate national team as defined under FIFA eligibility rules; some limited exceptions apply. Players may hold more than one non-FIFA nationality.

No.	Pos.	Nation	Player
5	DF	URU	Guillermo Rodríguez (Free agent; last with (Uruguay) Peñarol)
6	MF	MEX	Christian Bermúdez (loan return from Puebla)
9	FW	MEX	Enrique Esqueda (on loan from UANL)
11	FW	COL	Franco Arizala (on loan from Puebla)
12	MF	PAR	Luis Miño (on loan from (Paraguay) Nacional)
13	GK	MEX	Jorge Villalpando (on loan from Morelia)
21	GK	URU	Leonardo Burián (on loan from (Uruguay) Montevideo Wanderers)
22	FW	BRA	Mateus Gonçalves (on loan from Pachuca)
23	GK	MEX	Moisés Muñoz (on loan from América)
28	MF	BRA	Lucas Silva (on loan from Cruz Azul)
32	MF	PAR	Marcelo Estigarribia (on loan from (Uruguay) Deportivo Maldonado)

Out: Note: Flags indicate national team as defined under FIFA eligibility rules; some limited exceptions apply. Players may hold more than one non-FIFA nationality.

No.	Pos.	Nation	Player
5	MF	URU	Egidio Arévalo Ríos (to Veracruz)
11	FW	ECU	José Ayoví (loan return to Tijuana)
12	GK	CHI	Mauricio Viana (on loan to (Peru) Sporting Cristal)
19	FW	MEX	Javier Orozco (loan return to Santos Laguna)
21	GK	MEX	Óscar Jiménez (to América)
22	GK	MEX	Liborio Sánchez (loan return to Querétaro)
23	FW	MEX	Martín Zúñiga (loan return to América)
34	DF	MEX	Luis Hernández (on loan to Tapachula)
294	GK	MEX	Erick Gil (on loan to Coras)

=== Cruz Azul ===
In: Note: Flags indicate national team as defined under FIFA eligibility rules; some limited exceptions apply. Players may hold more than one non-FIFA nationality.

No.	Pos.	Nation	Player
7	FW	URU	Martín Cauteruccio (from (Argentina) San Lorenzo)
8	MF	ARG	Gabriel Peñalba (from Veracruz)
13	FW	ECU	Ángel Mena (from (Ecuador) Emelec)
14	FW	CHI	Martín Rodríguez (from (Chile) Colo-Colo)

Out: Note: Flags indicate national team as defined under FIFA eligibility rules; some limited exceptions apply. Players may hold more than one non-FIFA nationality.

No.	Pos.	Nation	Player
7	MF	ESP	Victor Vazquez (to (Canada) Toronto)
8	FW	ECU	Joffre Guerrón (released)
11	FW	ARG	Jonathan Cristaldo (on loan to Monterrey)
14	MF	COL	Aldo Leao Ramirez (loan return to Atlas)
29	FW	MEX	Erick Torres (loan return to (United States) Houston Dynamo)
—	DF	MEX	Gerardo Flores (released)
—	DF	MEX	Horacio Cervantes (released; previously on loan at Veracruz)
—	MF	COL	Carlos Lizarazo (to (Colombia) Alianza Petrolera; previously on loan at (United States) Dallas)
—	MF	BRA	Lucas Silva (on loan to Chiapas)
—	MF	MEX	Alejandro Vela (on loan to Venados; previously on loan at Necaxa)
—	MF	ESP	Marc Crosas (on loan to Tampico Madero; previously on loan at (Spain) Tenerife)
—	FW	MEX	Matías Vuoso (on loan to UAT; previously at (Argentina) Talleres de Córdoba)
—	FW	MEX	Julio Pardini (on loan to (Costa Rica) Herediano; previously on loan at Cafetaleros de Tapachula)

=== Guadalajara ===
In: Note: Flags indicate national team as defined under FIFA eligibility rules; some limited exceptions apply. Players may hold more than one non-FIFA nationality.

No.	Pos.	Nation	Player
19	FW	MEX	Guillermo Martínez (on loan from Pachuca)
20	MF	MEX	Rodolfo Pizarro (from Pachuca)
21	FW	MEX	Carlos Fierro (loan return from Querétaro)

Out: Note: Flags indicate national team as defined under FIFA eligibility rules; some limited exceptions apply. Players may hold more than one non-FIFA nationality.

No.	Pos.	Nation	Player
1	GK	MEX	Antonio Rodríguez (on loan to León)
19	FW	MEX	Marco Bueno (loan return to Pachuca)
26	DF	MEX	Carlos Villanueva (on loan to Coras)
27	MF	MEX	Carlos Peña (on loan to León)
35	FW	MEX	Daniel Ríos (on loan to Coras)

=== León ===
In: Note: Flags indicate national team as defined under FIFA eligibility rules; some limited exceptions apply. Players may hold more than one non-FIFA nationality.

No.	Pos.	Nation	Player
1	GK	MEX	Antonio Rodríguez (on loan from Guadalajara)
23	DF	CHI	Juan Cornejo (from (Chile) Audax Italiano)
27	MF	MEX	Carlos Peña (on loan from Guadalajara)

Out: Note: Flags indicate national team as defined under FIFA eligibility rules; some limited exceptions apply. Players may hold more than one non-FIFA nationality.

No.	Pos.	Nation	Player
2	DF	MEX	Efraín Velarde (on loan to Toluca)
14	MF	USA	Miguel Ibarra (to (United States) Minnesota United)
22	MF	ARG	Juan Cuevas (loan return to Zacatecas)
29	MF	MEX	Aldo Rocha (on loan to Morelia)
—	DF	MEX	Jonny Magallón (on loan to Zacatecas; previously on loan at (Argentina) Lanús)

=== Monterrey ===
In: Note: Flags indicate national team as defined under FIFA eligibility rules; some limited exceptions apply. Players may hold more than one non-FIFA nationality.

No.	Pos.	Nation	Player
1	GK	MEX	Hugo González (from América)
11	FW	ARG	Jonathan Cristaldo (on loan from Cruz Azul)
18	DF	MEX	Luis Fuentes (on loan from Pumas)
21	MF	MEX	Jesús Molina (from Santos Laguna)
25	DF	ARG	Nicolás Gabriel Sánchez (from (Argentina) Racing)
29	FW	MEX	Marco Bueno (on loan from Pachuca)

Out: Note: Flags indicate national team as defined under FIFA eligibility rules; some limited exceptions apply. Players may hold more than one non-FIFA nationality.

No.	Pos.	Nation	Player
1	GK	MEX	Jonathan Orozco (to Santos Laguna)
11	FW	HON	Alberth Elis (on loan to (United States) Houston Dynamo)
21	DF	MEX	Hiram Mier (on loan to Querétaro)
24	MF	MEX	César de la Peña (on loan to (Costa Rica) Belén)
27	MF	MEX	Luis Pérez (Retired)
100	FW	MEX	Julio César Cruz (on loan to (Costa Rica) Belén)

=== Morelia ===
In: Note: Flags indicate national team as defined under FIFA eligibility rules; some limited exceptions apply. Players may hold more than one non-FIFA nationality.

No.	Pos.	Nation	Player
3	DF	MEX	Gerardo Rodriguez (on loan from Toluca)
13	GK	URU	Sebastián Sosa (on loan from Pachuca)
22	FW	PER	Andy Polo (from (Colombia) Millonarios)
24	DF	ECU	Gabriel Achilier (from (Ecuador) Emelec)
25	MF	MEX	Mario Osuna (on loan from Querétaro)
26	MF	MEX	Aldo Rocha (on loan from León)

Out: Note: Flags indicate national team as defined under FIFA eligibility rules; some limited exceptions apply. Players may hold more than one non-FIFA nationality.

No.	Pos.	Nation	Player
4	DF	MEX	Hugo Rodríguez (loan return to Pachuca)

=== Necaxa ===
In: Note: Flags indicate national team as defined under FIFA eligibility rules; some limited exceptions apply. Players may hold more than one non-FIFA nationality.

No.	Pos.	Nation	Player
9	MF	CHI	Nicolás Maturana (from Universidad de Chile)
20	FW	ARG	Maxi Barreiro (from (Ecuador) Delfín)
24	MF	ARG	Jonás Aguirre (on loan from (Argentina) Rosario Central)

Out: Note: Flags indicate national team as defined under FIFA eligibility rules; some limited exceptions apply. Players may hold more than one non-FIFA nationality.

No.	Pos.	Nation	Player
5	DF	ARG	Fernando Meza (to (Chile) Colo-Colo)
9	FW	MEX	Rodrigo Prieto (loan return to Sinaloa)
13	DF	MEX	Érik Vera (loan return to UNAM)
14	MF	MEX	Alejandro Vela (loan return to Cruz Azul)
20	MF	VEN	Jesús Gómez (loan return to Sinaloa)

=== Pachuca ===
In: Note: Flags indicate national team as defined under FIFA eligibility rules; some limited exceptions apply. Players may hold more than one non-FIFA nationality.

No.	Pos.	Nation	Player
5	MF	MEX	Víctor Guzmán (from Guadalajara, Previously on loan)
7	FW	URU	Braian Rodriguez (from (Chile) Everton)
9	MF	CHI	Sergio Vergara (from Celaya)
25	MF	MEX	Roberto Alvarado (from Celaya)
28	GK	MEX	Rafael Ramírez (on loan from Zacatecas)
33	DF	COL	Stefan Medina (re-loan from Monterrey)

Out: Note: Flags indicate national team as defined under FIFA eligibility rules; some limited exceptions apply. Players may hold more than one non-FIFA nationality.

No.	Pos.	Nation	Player
7	MF	MEX	Rodolfo Pizarro (to Guadalajara)
9	FW	BRA	Mateus Gonçalves (on loan to Chiapas)
11	MF	ARG	Rubén Botta (to (Argentina) San Lorenzo)
18	DF	MEX	Joaquin Martinez (on loan to Zacatecas)
19	FW	COL	Wilson Morelo (on loan to (Chile) Everton)
25	MF	MEX	David Ramirez (on loan to Celaya)
—	GK	MEX	Rodolfo Cota (re-loan to Guadalajara)
—	GK	URU	Sebastián Sosa (on loan to Morelia, previously on loan at (Argentina) Rosario Central)
—	DF	MEX	Miguel Herrera (on loan to Veracruz, previously on loan at UANL)
—	DF	MEX	Hugo Rodríguez (on loan to Zacatecas, previously on loan at Morelia)
—	MF	MEX	Francisco Venegas (on loan to (Chile) Everton)
—	FW	MEX	Marco Bueno (on loan to Monterrey, preiviously on loan at Guadalajara)
—	FW	MEX	Guillermo Martínez (on loan to Guadalajara, previously on loan at Coras)

=== Puebla ===
In: Note: Flags indicate national team as defined under FIFA eligibility rules; some limited exceptions apply. Players may hold more than one non-FIFA nationality.

No.	Pos.	Nation	Player
4	DF	ARG	Iván Centurión (from (Uruguay) Cerro)
7	DF	MEX	Emilio Orrantía (re-loan from Santos Laguna)
8	MF	MEX	Francisco Acuña (loan return from BUAP)
10	MF	URU	Gonzalo Ramos (from (Uruguay) Cerro)
11	FW	ARG	Federico González (on loan from (Argentina) Tigre)
19	FW	MEX	Jerónimo Amione (from Cruz Azul, previously on loan)
29	MF	COL	Carlos Rodríguez (from (Colombia) Atlético F.C.)
32	DF	ARG	Claudio Pérez (from (Argentina) Banfield)
33	DF	URU	Pablo Cáceres Rodríguez (from (Argentina) Tigre)
34	MF	ARG	Gabriel Esparza (on loan from (Argentina) San Lorenzo)

Out: Note: Flags indicate national team as defined under FIFA eligibility rules; some limited exceptions apply. Players may hold more than one non-FIFA nationality.

No.	Pos.	Nation	Player
4	DF	MEX	Sergio Ceballos (loan return to Santos Laguna)
8	FW	COL	Franco Arizala (on loan to Chiapas)
9	MF	ARG	Mauro Cejas (loan return to Santos Laguna)
10	MF	MEX	Christian Bermúdez (loan return to Chiapas)
11	FW	ARG	Matias Alustiza (to Atlas)
24	DF	MEX	Sergio Pérez (on loan to Venados)
26	DF	MEX	Roberto Carlos Juárez (on loan to (Panama) Alianza)
29	MF	ARG	Damián Escudero (to (Brazil) Vasco da Gama)

=== Querétaro ===
In: Note: Flags indicate national team as defined under FIFA eligibility rules; some limited exceptions apply. Players may hold more than one non-FIFA nationality.

No.	Pos.	Nation	Player
10	MF	MEX	Gerardo Lugo (on loan from UANL)
24	MF	MEX	Armando Zamorano (from Morelia, previously on loan)
27	DF	MEX	Hiram Mier (on loan from Monterrey)

Out: Note: Flags indicate national team as defined under FIFA eligibility rules; some limited exceptions apply. Players may hold more than one non-FIFA nationality.

No.	Pos.	Nation	Player
9	FW	MEX	Carlos Fierro (loan return to Guadalajara)
10	FW	CHI	Patricio Rubio (on loan to Sinaloa)
13	DF	MEX	Víctor Milke (on loan to Sonora)
17	MF	MEX	Mario Osuna (to Morelia)
—	MF	MEX	Alan Zamora (released; previously on loan at Veracruz)

=== Santos Laguna ===
In: Note: Flags indicate national team as defined under FIFA eligibility rules; some limited exceptions apply. Players may hold more than one non-FIFA nationality.

No.	Pos.	Nation	Player
1	GK	MEX	Jonathan Orozco (from Monterrey)
3	DF	USA	Ventura Alvarado (from América)
9	FW	ARG	Julio Furch (from Veracruz)
10	MF	PAR	Osvaldo Martínez (from América)
25	MF	MEX	Jorge Enriquez (on loan from Guadalajara)

Out: Note: Flags indicate national team as defined under FIFA eligibility rules; some limited exceptions apply. Players may hold more than one non-FIFA nationality.

No.	Pos.	Nation	Player
1	GK	ARG	Agustin Marchesin (to América)
3	DF	MEX	Kristian Álvarez (loan return to Guadalajara)
4	MF	MEX	Jesús Molina (to Monterrey)
10	MF	CHI	Bryan Rabello (on loan to UNAM)
17	FW	COL	Fredy Hinestroza (to Veracruz)
22	FW	ARG	Martín Bravo (loan return to León)
—	DF	MEX	Emilio Orrantía (re-loan to Puebla)
—	MF	ARG	Mauro Cejas (to (Argentina) Unión, previously on loan at Puebla)
—	FW	MEX	Javier Orozco (on loan to Veracruz, previously on loan at Chiapas)

=== Tijuana ===
In: Note: Flags indicate national team as defined under FIFA eligibility rules; some limited exceptions apply. Players may hold more than one non-FIFA nationality.

No.	Pos.	Nation	Player
7	FW	ARG	Juan Martín Lucero (on loan from (Malaysia) JDT)
8	MF	USA	Joe Corona (loan return from Sinaloa)
23	DF	MEX	Juan Pablo Meza (on loan from Sinaloa)
29	GK	MEX	Luis Ernesto Michel (from Sinaloa)
32	MF	ARG	Jorge Ortiz (on loan from (Argentina) Independiente)

Out: Note: Flags indicate national team as defined under FIFA eligibility rules; some limited exceptions apply. Players may hold more than one non-FIFA nationality.

No.	Pos.	Nation	Player
4	DF	USA	Greg Garza (on loan to (United States) Atlanta United)
7	FW	ARG	Gabriel Hauche (on loan to Toluca)
8	FW	BRA	Juninho (on loan to (United States) Chicago Fire)
17	FW	COL	Dayro Moreno (on loan to (Colombia) Atlético Nacional)
30	FW	ARG	Héctor Villalba (loan return to (United States) Atlanta United)
33	GK	ARG	Federico Vilar (retired)

=== Toluca ===
In: Note: Flags indicate national team as defined under FIFA eligibility rules; some limited exceptions apply. Players may hold more than one non-FIFA nationality.

No.	Pos.	Nation	Player
2	DF	MEX	Efrain Velarde (on loan from Monterrey)
7	FW	ARG	Gabriel Hauche (on loan from Tijuana)
19	MF	ARG	Rubens Sambueza (from América)
29	DF	MEX	Rodrigo Salinas (on loan from Tijuana)
33	DF	MEX	Carlos Calvo (on loan from Atlante)

Out: Note: Flags indicate national team as defined under FIFA eligibility rules; some limited exceptions apply. Players may hold more than one non-FIFA nationality.

No.	Pos.	Nation	Player
2	DF	MEX	Francisco Gamboa (on loan to Atlante)
7	MF	MEX	Moisés Velasco (on loan to Sinaloa)
12	GK	MEX	Miguel Centeno (on loan to Correcaminos UAT)
16	DF	MEX	Gerardo Rodríguez (on loan to Morelia)
17	FW	MEX	Diego Gama (on loan to Potros UAEM)
19	MF	MEX	Edy Brambila (on loan to Tapachula)
104	DF	MEX	Emilio Yamín (on loan to Potros UAEM)
108	DF	MEX	Diego Aguilar (on loan to Lobos BUAP)
—	MF	MEX	Gabriel Velasco (re-loan to Potros UAEM)
—	FW	COL	Wilder Guisao (on loan to Chiapas, previously on loan at (Argentina) Racing)

=== UANL ===
In: Note: Flags indicate national team as defined under FIFA eligibility rules; some limited exceptions apply. Players may hold more than one non-FIFA nationality.

No.	Pos.	Nation	Player
26	FW	CHI	Eduardo Vargas (from (Germany) 1899 Hoffenheim)
16	DF	PER	Luis Advíncula (from (Turkey) Bursaspor)

Out: Note: Flags indicate national team as defined under FIFA eligibility rules; some limited exceptions apply. Players may hold more than one non-FIFA nationality.

No.	Pos.	Nation	Player
5	FW	PAR	Fernando Fernández (on loan to (Paraguay) Olimpia)
9	FW	FRA	Andy Delort (to (France) Toulouse)
13	DF	MEX	Miguel Herrera (loan return to Pachuca)
—	GK	USA	Austin Guerrero (on loan to (Panama) Alianza, previously on loan at Puebla)
—	DF	MEX	Abraham Stringel (on loan to (Colombia) Alianza Petrolera, previously on loan at Cimarrones de Sonora)
—	DF	MEX	Antonio Briseño (on loan to Veracruz, previously on loan at Juárez)
—	DF	MEX	Alonso Zamora (on loan to Juárez, previously on loan at Chiapas)
—	MF	MEX	Gerardo Lugo (on loan to Querétaro)
—	FW	PER	Joel Sánchez (on loan to (Peru) Sporting Cristal)
—	FW	MEX	Enrique Esqueda (on loan to Chiapas)

=== UNAM ===
In: Note: Flags indicate national team as defined under FIFA eligibility rules; some limited exceptions apply. Players may hold more than one non-FIFA nationality.

No.	Pos.	Nation	Player
5	DF	MEX	Erik Vera (loan return from Necaxa)
11	MF	CHI	Bryan Rabello (on loan from Santos Laguna)
15	DF	MEX	Alan Mendoza (loan return from Sinaloa)
30	FW	CHI	Nicolás Castillo (from (Belgium) Brugge)
35	MF	ARG	Franco Faría (from (Argentina) Unión)

Out: Note: Flags indicate national team as defined under FIFA eligibility rules; some limited exceptions apply. Players may hold more than one non-FIFA nationality.

No.	Pos.	Nation	Player
5	DF	MEX	Luis Fuentes (on loan to Monterrey)
9	FW	ECU	Fidel Martínez (to Atlas)
11	FW	ESP	Saúl Berjón (to (Spain) Real Oviedo)
12	DF	MEX	Orlando Pineda (released)
15	FW	MEX	Eduardo Herrera (on loan to Veracruz)
16	DF	MEX	Marcelo Alatorre (on loan to Veracruz)
23	FW	MEX	Alfonso Nieto (on loan to (Costa Rica) Herediano)
—	FW	MEX	David Izazola (on loan to (Guatemala) Comunicaciones, previously Retired)
—	FW	ARG	Daniel Ludueña (on loan to Tampico Madero, previously on loan at (Argentina) Talleres)

=== Veracruz ===
In: Note: Flags indicate national team as defined under FIFA eligibility rules; some limited exceptions apply. Players may hold more than one non-FIFA nationality.

No.	Pos.	Nation	Player
2	DF	MEX	Marcelo Alatorre (on loan from UNAM)
4	DF	MEX	Antonio Briseño (on loan from UANL)
8	MF	MEX	Ángel Reyna (on loan from Celaya)
11	FW	ARG	Martín Bravo (from León)
14	MF	ARG	Cristian Pellerano (on loan from América)
15	FW	MEX	Eduardo Herrera (on loan from UNAM)
17	MF	URU	Egidio Arévalo Ríos (from Chiapas)
20	DF	COL	Jefferson Murillo (from (Colombia) Cúcuta)
22	FW	CHI	Felipe Flores (Free agent; last with Tijuana)
30	DF	MEX	Kristian Álvarez (from Guadalajara)
33	FW	MEX	Javier Orozco (on loan from Santos Laguna)
34	GK	ARG	Luis Ojeda (from Venados)
35	MF	MEX	Juan Carlos Mosqueda (Free agent; last with Necaxa)
36	DF	MEX	Dárvin Chávez (Free agent; last with Monterrey)
37	DF	MEX	Miguel Herrera (on loan from Pachuca)
38	MF	MEX	Miguel Cancela (loan return from Orizaba)
39	MF	ARG	Leandro Velázquez (from (Colombia) Deportivo Pasto)
40	MF	COL	Fredy Hinestroza (from (Colombia) La Equidad)

Out: Note: Flags indicate national team as defined under FIFA eligibility rules; some limited exceptions apply. Players may hold more than one non-FIFA nationality.

No.	Pos.	Nation	Player
7	MF	MEX	Alan Zamora (loan return to Querétaro)
8	MF	ARG	Gabriel Peñalba (to Cruz Azul)
11	FW	ARG	Julio Furch (to Santos Laguna)
12	DF	MEX	Horacio Cervantes (loan return to Cruz Azul)
14	MF	MEX	Luis Sánchez (on loan to Venados)
15	MF	COL	Juan Pérez (on loan to Celaya)
17	MF	USA	Sebastian Saucedo (loan return to (United States) Real Salt Lake)
22	DF	MEX	Óscar Vera (released)
32	GK	MEX	José Rocchi (released)

== See also ==
- 2016–17 Liga MX season
