= Alberto Frison =

Italian footballer (born 1988)

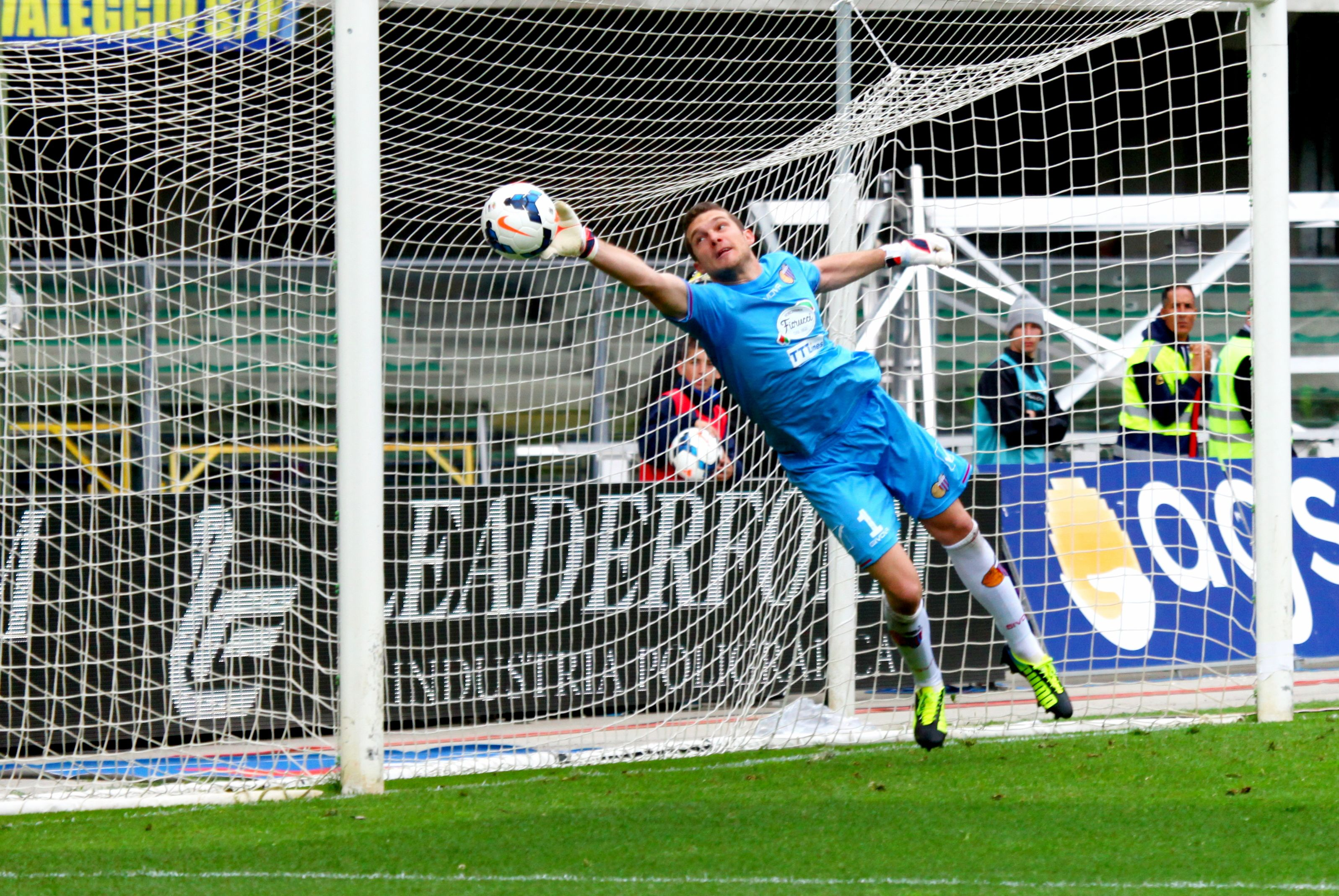

Personal information
- Date of birth: 22 January 1988 (age 38)
- Place of birth: Mirano, Italy
- Height: 1.90 m (6 ft 3 in)
- Position: Goalkeeper

Youth career
- 2000–2006: Treviso

Senior career*
Years	Team	Apps	(Gls)
2006–2008	Treviso	0	(0)
2007–2008	→ Manfredonia (loan)	23	(0)
2008–2012	Vicenza	59	(0)
2010	→ Genoa (loan)	0	(0)
2011	→ Frosinone (loan)	17	(0)
2012–2016	Catania	33	(0)
2015	→ Sampdoria (loan)	0	(0)
2015	→ Salernitana (loan)	0	(0)
2016–2017	Sambenedettese	4	(0)
2017	Racing Roma	0	(0)
2018–2019	Manfredonia	0	(0)

International career
2004	Italy U16	1	(0)
2004–2005	Italy U17	4	(0)
2005	Italy U18	1	(0)
2006	Italy U19	1	(0)
2007–2008	Italy U20	4	(0)
- * Club domestic league appearances and goals

Alberto Frison (born 22 January 1988) is an Italian former professional footballer who played as a goalkeeper.

== Club career ==
=== Treviso ===
Born in Mirano, Veneto. Frison started his professional career at Veneto side Treviso. He played for Treviso's youth set-up from 2000 to 2007 and was part of the Primavera under-20 team since the 2005–06 season. Frison was primary deployed as the first choice goalkeeper for the Primavera squad, before being promoted to the first team in 2006. He was awarded the number 12 jersey in the first team, and worked as the fourth choice goalkeeper behind Vlada Avramov, Alex Cordaz and Maxminio Montresor. Frison officially graduated from the youth team in June 2007, and was loaned to Lega Pro Prima Divisione side Manfredonia in July 2007. With the Lega Pro Prima Divisione club, Frison was the first choice goalkeeper, ahead of Giacomo Bindi and Manolo Leacche. His performances at the club were not enough to avoid relegation as Manfredonia finished last in Group A and were relegated to the Lega Pro Seconda Divisione as a result.

On 30 June 2008, Frison returned to Treviso, and ahead of the 2008–09 Serie B season, the goalkeeper was retained to the first team, to act as an understudy to Cordaz. On 1 September, however, Frison transferred to fellow Serie B side Vicenza in a co-ownership deal, for €300,000, and in exchange, veteran Matteo Guardalben moved from Vicenza to Treviso as part of the deal, for €50,000.

=== Vicenza ===
Frison officially joined Vicenza on the deadline day of the 2008 summer transfer window. At Vicenza, he was awarded the number 1 jersey, and he worked as understudy to veteran goalkeeper, Marco Fortin, but Frison went on to make 8 league appearances that season. In June 2009 Vicenza bought Frison outright from Treviso for an additional €5,000. Treviso went bankrupted in summer 2009.

During the 2009–10 Serie B campaign, Frison continued as the club's second choice goalkeeper behind Fortin and ahead of Cristian Cicioni and José Rocchi. On 18 January 2010, Serie A side Genoa signed Frison on a six-month loan deal from Vicenza. In return, Danilo Russo moved to Vicenza in a co-ownership agreement. Once at Genoa, Frison was given the number 1 jersey, and served as the third choice goalkeeper behind Marco Amelia and Alessio Scarpi. Despite making no Serie A appearances for the Ligurian club, Frison played a friendly match for Genoa at the end of season.

Frison returned to Vicenza on 30 June 2010, ahead of the 2010–11 Serie B season. Upon his return to the club, Frison became a regular at the biancorossi, making 12 league starts for the club in this first half of the new season. On 19 January 2011, however, he was loaned out to Frosinone. On 31 January 2011, Pierluigi Frattali transferred from Frosinone to Vicenza, in exchange. During his loan spell with Frosinone, Frison became the first choice keeper, making 17 league appearances. On 30 June 2011, Frison returned to Vicenza following the expiration of the loan deal.

Following his return to Vicenza, Frison took the number 88 jersey, and was expected to compete with veteran Paolo Acerbis for a starting spot. He instantly became the club's starting goalkeeper following his return and would go on to become an indispensable part of the team's 2011–12 squad, making over 45 appearances in all competitions with 41 appearances in the league. In January 2012, Frison was strongly linked with a move to several clubs. Frison remained at Vicenza, but was unable to prevent the club's eventual relegation to the Lega Pro Prima Divisione following the play-off loss on aggregate to Empoli.

=== Catania ===
On 6 July 2012, Frison transferred to Catania in a co-ownership agreement on a five-year contract. The total cost of the transfer was €650,000, though fullback Raffaele Imparato transferred to Vicenza as part-exchange for free. Frison was expected to compete with Argentina international Mariano Andújar for a starting role following the loan return of Juan Pablo Carrizo to Lazio, the departure of Tomáš Košický to Novara and the expiration of Andrea Campagnolo's contract. Since his arrival at the Sicilian club, Frison has served as a backup to Andújar, and has made three appearances in the 2012–13 Coppa Italia. He would go on to make his Serie A debut, in an away loss to Milan on 28 April 2013, after Andújar was handed a three-match suspension from league play. On 5 May 2013, Frison earned his first Serie A clean sheet in a 3–0 home victory over Siena. In June 2013, Catania signed Frison outright for another €700,000.

Frison became a first choice since mid of 2013–14 Serie A season. He followed the club relegated to 2014–15 Serie B.

In January 2015 Frison was signed by Serie A club U.C. Sampdoria in a temporary deal.

Due to a match-fixing scandal, Catania was relegated to Lega Pro at the start of 2015–16 season. On 31 August 2015, Serie B newcomer Salernitana signed Frison on loan with an obligation to sign outright at the end of season, as well as Moses Odjer in a temporary deal with an option to sign outright. At the same time Catania signed keeper Luca Liverani (in a 1-year contract), forwards Andrea Russotto and Caetano Calil in definitive deals. However, on 2 September he was released.

=== Sambenedettese ===
On 4 August 2016 Frison was signed by Sambenedettese in a 1-year contract.

== International career ==
Frison has been capped for Italy national youth teams since 2004, all in friendly matches. He was named in the 23-man preliminary squad for the 2005 UEFA European Under-17 Football Championship, which Italy automatic qualified as host, but was excluded from the 18-men final squad. After Enrico Alfonso was sent off in the group stage of the tournament, Frison was originally eligible for selection to the squad as emergency backup, but was injured. Frison played his only match for the under-18 team in 2005, ahead of Enrico Alfonso and Paolo Tornaghi.

He was capped for the Italy under-20 team at the 2007–08 Four Nations Tournament, and in an unofficial friendly against Serie D Best XI. Since 2008–09 season, he was called–up to the U21 Serie B representative team. He played in internal friendlies, which the team split into blue and white teams and against each other.

On 1 October 2010, Frison received a call-up from the under-21 team for the first time. He participated in both legs of the 2011 UEFA European Under-21 Football Championship play-off round as an unused substitute. Italy were eliminated and Frison would no longer be eligible to the U21 team of 2011–13 season, effectively ending his short U21 career.

== Personal life ==
He is the son of former football goalkeeper Lorenzo Frison, who played professionally for teams such as Palermo and Pescara in the 1970s and the 1980s.
