= Óscar Arce =

Óscar Arce may refer to:

- Luis Oscar Fulloné Arce (born 1934), Argentinian football forward, known as Óscar Arce in the UK and Australia
- Óscar Martín Arce Paniagua (born 1967), Mexican politician
- Óscar Arce (Colombian footballer) (born 1990), Colombian football defender
- Óscar Arce (Mexican footballer) (born 1995), Mexican football midfielder
