= Ocaña =

Ocaña may refer to:

== People ==
- Aguas Santas Ocaña Navarro (born 1963), Spanish-born first lady of Honduras
- Álvaro Ocaña (born 1993), Spanish footballer
- Ángel Ocaña (born 1960), Spanish racing cyclist
- Christian Ocaña (born 1992), Mexican footballer
- Graciela Ocaña (born 1960), Argentine politician
- es:José Pérez Ocaña (1947–1983), Spanish painter, anarchist and LGBT activist
- Luis Ocaña (1945–1994), Spanish road bicycle racer
- Manuel Ortega Ocaña (born 1981), Spanish road cyclist
- Octavio Ocaña (born c.1982), Mexican actor
- Samuel Ocaña García (1931–2024), Mexican politician and doctor

== Places ==
- Mesa de Ocaña, a comarca in Castilla-La Mancha, Spain, in the province of Toledo
- Ocaña, Colombia, a city in Colombia
  - Convention of Ocaña, 1828
  - Diocese of Ocaña
- Ocaña, Spain, a town in the province of Toledo, Spain
  - Battle of Ocaña (1809), during the Peninsular War

== Other ==
- Ocana, Corse-du-Sud, a commune of France in the Corse-du-Sud department on the island of Corsica
- Ocana people, an extinct Native American tribe

== See also ==
- Ocana, an Intermittent Portrait, a 1978 Spanish documentary film about José Pérez Ocaña
- Peribáñez y el Comendador de Ocaña, a play by Lope de Vega written in the late 16th or early 17th century
