= Mauro Contreras =

Mexican footballer (born 1996)

Personal information
- Full name: Mauro Isidro Contreras Hernández
- Date of birth: 15 January 1996 (age 30)
- Place of birth: Lagos de Moreno, Jalisco, Mexico
- Height: 1.69 m (5 ft 7 in)
- Position: Winger

Team information
- Current team: Zacatepec
- Number: 20

Youth career
- 2011–2017: Guadalajara

Senior career*
Years	Team	Apps	(Gls)
2017–	Guadalajara	1	(0)
2017–	→ Zacatepec (loan)	0	(0)
- * Club domestic league appearances and goals as of 5 May 2017

Mauro Isidro Contreras Hernández (born January 15, 1996) is a Mexican professional footballer who plays as a midfielder for Zacatepec on loan from Liga MX club C.D. Guadalajara.

== Career ==
He made his official debut under Argentine coach Matias Almeyda against Cruz Azul on 22 April 2017.

== Honours ==
=== Club ===
Guadalajara

- Liga MX: Clausura 2017
- Copa MX: Clausura 2017
