= Maxminio Montresor =

Brazilian footballer

Personal information
- Date of birth: 3 March 1980 (age 46)
- Place of birth: Cuiabá, Brazil
- Height: 1.87 m (6 ft 2 in)
- Position: Goalkeeper

Senior career*
Years	Team	Apps	(Gls)
2006	Olaria		
2006	Cuiabá		
2006–2008	Treviso	2	(0)
2008	Martina	6	(0)
2009	Palmeiras (MT)		
2009–2011	Operário Ltda		
- * Club domestic league appearances and goals

Maxminio Montresor or Maxminio Montrezol (born 3 March 1980) is a Brazilian footballer who plays as a goalkeeper.

== Career ==
He has previously played for Olaria, Cuiabá Esporte Clube, Treviso and Martina.

In 2006, he traveled to Italy as Maxminio Montresor with DOB on 4 March, but in Brazil his DOB on official document on 3 March as Montrezol.

In 2009, he returned to Mato Grosso for Palmeiras (MT), then in October 2009 for Operário (MT) for 2010 Campeonato Matogrossense.
