= Alexis Ochoa =

Mexican footballer

Personal information
- Full name: Alexis Guillermo Ochoa Gomez
- Date of birth: 13 July 1993 (age 33)
- Place of birth: Toluca, Mexico State, Mexico
- Height: 1.73 m (5 ft 8 in)
- Position: Forward

Youth career
- 2008–2012: Deportivo Toluca

Senior career*
Years	Team	Apps	(Gls)
2012–2013	Deportivo Toluca	1	(0)
2014–2019	Potros UAEM	41	(4)
2020	Industriales Naucalpan	0	(0)
- * Club domestic league appearances and goals

Alexis Guillermo Ochoa Gómez (born 13 July 1992 in Toluca) is a Mexican professional footballer who currently plays for Industriales Naucalpan.
