= Diego Aguilar (footballer) =

Mexican footballer (born 1997)

Personal information
- Full name: Diego de Jesús Aguilar Millán
- Date of birth: 13 January 1997 (age 29)
- Place of birth: Toluca, State of Mexico, Mexico
- Height: 1.69 m (5 ft 7 in)
- Position: Midfielder

Team information
- Current team: Atlético Morelia
- Number: 20

Youth career
- 2010–2014: Toluca
- 2014: Tlaxcala

Senior career*
Years	Team	Apps	(Gls)
2015–2019	Toluca	0	(0)
2017	→ Lobos BUAP (loan)	2	(0)
2017–2018	→ Atlante (loan)	18	(0)
2018–2019	→ Zacatecas (loan)	4	(0)
2019	Tlaxcala	13	(1)
2019	Salamanca UDS	2	(0)
2020–2021	Zacatecas	32	(3)
2021–2022	Pumas Tabasco	15	(0)
2022–2023	Celaya	49	(4)
2024–2025	Tlaxcala	38	(4)
2025–2026	Tepatitlán	37	(5)
2026–	Atlético Morelia	9	(0)

International career
2015	Mexico U18	2	(0)
2017	Mexico U20	9	(0)
- * Club domestic league appearances and goals as of 21 September 2026

Diego de Jesús Aguilar Millán (born 13 January 1997) is a Mexican professional footballer who plays as a midfielder for Liga de Expansión MX club Atlético Morelia.

== Club career ==
=== Early career ===
Aguilar is currently register under Toluca's filial, Atlético Mexiquense.

=== Deportivo Toluca ===
On 29 July 2015, Aguilar made his official debut in a Copa MX match against Necaxa. Toluca won 4–2, Aguilar give one assistance.

=== Salamanca UDS ===
Aguillar moved to Spain and joined Salamanca CF UDS on 25 November 2019. However, due to a visa issue, he wasn't able to play for the club until mid-February 2020.

== International career ==
Aguilar was called up for the 2017 FIFA U-20 World Cup.
