= Nicolás Ruvalcaba =

Mexican footballer (born 1982)

Nicolás René Ruvalcaba Flores (Note: In this Spanish name, the first or paternal surname is Ruvalcaba and the second or maternal family name is Flores.) (born 7 October 1982, in Guadalajara, Jalisco) is a Mexican former professional footballer who played for Lobos BUAP.

== See also ==
- Football in Mexico
- List of football clubs in Mexico
