= Ían Arellano =

Mexican footballer (born 1997)

Personal information
- Full name: Ían de Jesús Arellano Lira
- Date of birth: 2 July 1997 (age 29)
- Place of birth: Monterrey, Mexico
- Height: 1.64 m (5 ft 4 1/2 in)
- Position: Midfielder

Youth career
- 2012–2016: Monterrey

Senior career*
Years	Team	Apps	(Gls)
2015–2016	Monterrey	0	(0)
2016–2018	→ FC Juárez (loan)	33	(1)
2018	→ Venados (loan)	7	(0)
- * Club domestic league appearances and goals as of 9 June 2018

Ían de Jesús Arellano Lira (born July 2, 1997) is a Mexican professional footballer who last played for Venados.

He is the son of former Mexican football player Jesús Arellano.
