= David Andrade (footballer) =

Mexican footballer (born 1993)

Personal information
- Full name: David Alfredo Andrade Gómez
- Date of birth: 9 July 1993 (age 33)
- Place of birth: Manzanillo, Colima, Mexico
- Height: 1.68 m (5 ft 6 in)
- Position: Left-back

Team information
- Current team: FC Santa Coloma

Youth career
- 2009–2015: Chiapas

Senior career*
Years	Team	Apps	(Gls)
2011–2016	Chiapas	26	(0)
2016–2022	Santos Laguna	40	(1)
2018–2019	→ Tampico Madero (loan)	25	(0)
2023	Atlético San Luis	10	(0)
2024–2025	Rànger's	24	(1)
2025	Atlètic Club d'Escaldes	0	(0)
2025–2026	Rànger's	22	(2)
2026–	FC Santa Coloma	0	(0)
- * Club domestic league appearances and goals as of 2 July 2026

David Alfredo Andrade Gómez (Note: In this Spanish name, the first or paternal surname is Andrade and the second or maternal family name is Gómez.) (born 9 July 1993) is a Mexican professional footballer who plays as a left-back for Primera Divisió club FC Santa Coloma.

== Honours ==
Santos Laguna

- Liga MX: Clausura 2018
