= Mario Rodríguez (footballer, born 1995) =

Mexican footballer

Personal information
- Full name: Mario Antonio Rodríguez Gaxiola
- Date of birth: 23 August 1995 (age 31)
- Place of birth: Ahome, Sinaloa, México
- Height: 1.80 m (5 ft 11 in)
- Position: Midfielder

Team information
- Current team: Tritones Vallarta

Senior career*
Years	Team	Apps	(Gls)
2014–2018	Santos Laguna	0	(0)
2016	→ Tampico Madero (loan)	3	(0)
2018	→ Guadalupe F.C. (loan)	7	(1)
2018–2020	Murciélagos	47	(19)
2020–2022	Sonora Premier	41	(7)
2022	Coras	10	(4)
2023–	Tritones Vallarta	2	(0)
- * Club domestic league appearances and goals as of March 17, 2021

Mario Antonio Rodríguez Gaxiola (Note: In this Spanish name, the first or paternal surname is Rodríguez and the second or maternal family name is Gaxiola.) (born 23 August 1995), also known as Marito, is a professional Mexican footballer who currently plays for Cimarrones de Sonora Premier.
