= Mario Orozco =

Mexican footballer

Personal information
- Full name: Mario Martín Orozco Sánchez
- Date of birth: 25 March 1994 (age 32)
- Place of birth: Villa de Álvarez, Colima, Mexico
- Height: 1.67 m (5 ft 6 in)
- Position: Left back

Youth career
- Guadalajara

Senior career*
Years	Team	Apps	(Gls)
2015–2019	Guadalajara	0	(0)
2015–2017	→ Coras (loan)	28	(0)
2017–2018	→ Zacatepec (loan)	8	(0)
2019–2020	Alebrijes de Oaxaca	16	(1)
- * Club domestic league appearances and goals as of July 27, 2020

Mario Martín Orozco Sánchez (born March 25, 1993) is a Mexican professional footballer who plays as a left back for Alebrijes de Oaxaca.

== Career ==
=== C.D. Guadalajara ===
Orozco spent his whole youth career at C.D. Guadalajara's youth academy.

==== Coras de Tepic (loan) ====
In July 2015, it was announced Orozco was sent out on loan to Ascenso MX club Coras de Tepic in order to gain professional playing experience. He made his professional debut on 24 July 2015 against Murciélagos.

==== Club Atlético Zacatepec (loan) ====
On June 10, 2017, Orozco was announced as one of the many who were loaned out from Chivas.
