= Jesús Veyna =

Mexican footballer (born 1995)

Personal information
- Full name: Jesús Zaid Veyna Montes
- Date of birth: 17 March 1995 (age 31)
- Place of birth: Zacatecas City, Zacatecas, Mexico
- Height: 1.82 m (6 ft 0 in)
- Position: Defender

Team information
- Current team: Gavilanes de Matamoros
- Number: 4

Youth career
- 2009–2013: San Luis
- 2013–2015: América

Senior career*
Years	Team	Apps	(Gls)
2016–2017	América	0	(0)
2016	→ Tepatitlán de Morelos (loan)	2	(0)
2016	→ Atlético San Luis (loan)	6	(0)
2016	→ Athletic Club Morelos (loan)	5	(1)
2016	→ Zacatepec (loan)	5	(0)
2017–2019	Necaxa	25	(0)
2019–2020	UAZ	23	(0)
2020–	Gavilanes de Matamoros	33	(5)
- * Club domestic league appearances and goals as of 15 March 2020

Jesús Zaid Veyna Montes (born March 17, 1995), is a Mexican professional footballer who plays for Gavilanes de Matamoros in the Mexican first division. He formerly played for Liga MX club Atlético San Luis and Liga MX side Club América.
