= Julio Betancio =

Mexican footballer (born 1988)

Personal information
- Full name: Julio César Betancio González
- Date of birth: January 3, 1988 (age 38)
- Place of birth: Guadalajara, Jalisco, Mexico
- Height: 1.66 m (5 ft 5 in)
- Position: Midfielder

Senior career*
Years	Team	Apps	(Gls)
2007–2013	Atlas		
2014–2015	C.D. Irapuato		
2015–2016	Cimarrones de Sonora		
- * Club domestic league appearances and goals

Julio César Betancio González (born January 3, 1988) is a Mexican former professional footballer who played as a midfielder.
