= Jafet Camou =

Mexican footballer (born 1990)

Personal information
- Full name: Jafet Misraim Arturo Camou Valenzuela
- Date of birth: 25 July 1990 (age 36)
- Place of birth: Hermosillo, Sonora, Mexico
- Height: 1.77 m (5 ft 10 in)
- Position: Goalkeeper

Senior career*
Years	Team	Apps	(Gls)
2010–2012	Cruz Azul Hidalgo	16	(0)
2013–2014	Ballenas Galeana	3	(0)
2014–2015	Alebrijes de Oaxaca	0	(0)
2015–2016	Murciélagos F.C.	11	(0)
2016–2017	Loros UdeC	13	(0)
Total		43	(0)
- * Club domestic league appearances and goals

Jafet Misraim Arturo Camou Valenzuela (born July 25, 1990, in Hermosillo, Sonora) is a Mexican professional footballer who plays for Loros UdeC of Ascenso MX.
