= Marco Vidal =

American soccer player

Personal information
- Full name: Marco Antonio Vidal Amaro
- Date of birth: February 21, 1986 (age 40)
- Place of birth: Dallas, Texas, United States
- Height: 1.70 m (5 ft 7 in)
- Position: Midfielder

Youth career
- 1998–2000: Guadalajara
- 2002: Tigres UANL
- 2007: Indios USA

Senior career*
| Years | Team | Apps | (Gls) |
| 2007–2011 | Indios | 46 | (0) |
| 2010 | → Pachuca (loan) | 10 | (0) |
| 2011 | → Club León (loan) | 16 | (0) |
| 2011–2014 | Club León | 12 | (0) |
| 2012–2014 | → Lobos BUAP (loan) | 49 | (0) |
| 2014–2015 | Mineros de Zacatecas | 26 | (0) |
| 2015–2016 | Atlético San Luis | 22 | (0) |
| 2016– | Veracruz | 3 | (0) |
- * Club domestic league appearances and goals as of September 23, 2016

Marco Antonio Vidal Amaro (born February 21, 1986) is an American former professional soccer player.

Vidal has played for C.F. Ciudad Juárez in the Primera División de México, however he was unable to prevent the club from being relegated following the close of the 2010 tournament.
