= Mario Quezada =

Mexican footballer (born 1992)

Personal information
- Full name: Mario Alberto Quezada Gutiérrez
- Date of birth: 2 May 1992 (age 34)
- Place of birth: Durango, Mexico
- Height: 1.68 m (5 ft 6 in)
- Position: Left-back

Youth career
- 2010–2012: Guadalajara

Senior career*
Years	Team	Apps	(Gls)
2013–2014	Puebla	2	(0)
2015–2016	Toluca	3	(0)
2016–2017	→ Lobos BUAP (loan)	7	(0)
2017	Tijuana Premier	17	(1)
2018	Murciélagos	15	(0)
2018	Zacatepec	4	(0)
2019	Sonora	19	(0)
2020	Murciélagos	9	(1)
2020	Cruz Azul Hidalgo	11	(1)
2021	CAFESSA Jalisco	8	(0)
- * Club domestic league appearances and goals as of 17 March 2021

Mario Alberto Quezada Gutiérrez (Note: In this Spanish name, the first or paternal surname is Quezada and the second or maternal family name is Gutiérrez.) (born 2 May 1992) is a Mexican footballer who plays as a left-back for Liga Premier de México team CAFESSA Jalisco.

== Club career ==
=== Early career ===
On 2010 Quezada started his career with C.D. Guadalajara where he played for the reserves and Chivas Rayadas in the second and third divisions.

=== Puebla ===
He was transferred to Puebla for the 2013–14 season where he played a couple of games in the Liga MX. On 23 July 2013, Quezada made his first appearance in a Copa MX match against Estudiantes de Altamira.

=== Toluca ===
On 2015, Quezada was transferred to the Toluca Red Devils and was registered with the first-team squad.
