= Christian Ocaña =

Mexican footballer (born 1992)

Personal information
- Full name: Christian Felipe Ocaña Téllez
- Date of birth: 18 March 1992 (age 34)
- Place of birth: Arriaga, Chiapas, Mexico
- Height: 1.68 m (5 ft 6 in)
- Position: Defender

Youth career
- 2010–2012: Chiapas

Senior career*
Years	Team	Apps	(Gls)
2013	Veracruz	0	(0)
2013–2015	Murciélagos	28	(0)
2015–2016	Pioneros de Cancún	29	(2)
2016–2019	U. de C.	72	(3)
2020–2021	Cafetaleros de Chiapas	18	(3)
- * Club domestic league appearances and goals as of 17:15, 17 March 2021 (UTC)

Christian Felipe Ocaña Téllez (born March 18, 1992), known as Christian Ocaña, is a former Mexican professional association football (soccer) player who last played for Cafetaleros de Chiapas.
