= Iván Centurión =

Argentine footballer

Personal information
- Full name: Iván Osvaldo Centurión
- Date of birth: 5 August 1988 (age 38)
- Place of birth: Isidro Casanova, Argentina
- Height: 1.83 m (6 ft 0 in)
- Position: Defender

Team information
- Current team: Berazategui

Youth career
- –2008: San Lorenzo

Senior career*
Years	Team	Apps	(Gls)
2008–2009	Platense	5	(0)
2009–2016	Almirante Brown	139	(2)
2016	Cerro	19	(0)
2017	Puebla	3	(0)
2017–2018	Aldosivi	2	(0)
2018–2020	Almirante Brown	26	(2)
2020–2021	Chacarita Juniors	18	(0)
2022	Camioneros	29	(0)
2023–2024	San Martín Burzaco	26	(0)
2025–	Berazategui		
- * Club domestic league appearances and goals as of 18:23, 20 March 2025 (UTC)

Osvaldo Iván Centurión (born August 5, 1988, in Isidro Casanova, Argentina) is an Argentine footballer currently playing as a centre back for Berazategui.

On December 14, 2016, Centurión transferred to Liga MX team Puebla FC.

== Career statistics ==
=== Club ===
As of 22 July 2018.

Club	Season	League			Cup		Continental		Other		Total	
Club	Season	Division	Apps	Goals	Apps	Goals	Apps	Goals	Apps	Goals	Apps	Goals
Platense	2008–09	Primera B Nacional	5	0	0	0	–		0	0	5	0
Almirante Brown	2009–10	Primera B Metropolitana	?	2	0	0	–		0	0	?	2
Almirante Brown	2010–11	Primera B Nacional	28	0	0	0	–		0	0	28	0
Almirante Brown	2011–12	Primera B Nacional	30	0	1 (Note: Appearances in the Copa Argentina)	0	–		0	0	31	0
Almirante Brown	2012–13	Primera B Nacional	26	0	1	0	–		0	0	27	0
Almirante Brown	2013–14	Primera B Nacional	13	0	0	0	–		0	0	13	0
Almirante Brown	2014	Primera B Metropolitana	11	0	0	0	–		0	0	11	0
Almirante Brown	2015	Primera B Metropolitana	31	0	1	0	–		0	0	32	0
Almirante Brown	Total		139	2	3	0	–		0	0	142	0
C.A. Cerro	2015–16	Uruguayan Primera División	7	0	0	0	–		0	0	7	0
C.A. Cerro	2016	Uruguayan Primera División	12	0	0	0	–		0	0	12	0
C.A. Cerro	Total		19	0	0	0	–		0	0	19	0
Puebla	2016–17	Liga MX	3	0	3 (Note: Appearances in the Copa MX)	0	–		0	0	6	0
Aldosivi	2017–18	Primera B Nacional	2	0	0	0	–		0	0	2	0
Almirante Brown	2018–19	Primera B Metropolitana	0	0	0	0	–		0	0	0	0
Total	Argentina		146	2	3	0	–		0	0	149	2
Total	Uruguay		19	0	0	0	–		0	0	19	0
Total	Mexico		3	0	3	0	–		0	0	6	0
Career total			168	2	6	0	–		0	0	174	2
