= Sergio Ceballos (footballer, born 1994) =

Mexican footballer (born 1994)

Personal information
- Full name: Sergio Ceballos Hernández
- Date of birth: 16 February 1994 (age 32)
- Place of birth: Torreón, Coahuila, Mexico
- Height: 1.89 m (6 ft 2 1/2 in)
- Position: Midfielder

Team information
- Current team: Pumas Tabasco

Youth career
- 2009–2012: Santos Laguna

Senior career*
Years	Team	Apps	(Gls)
2011–2018	Santos Laguna	44	(2)
2016–2017	→ Puebla (loan)	3	(0)
2017–2018	→ Tampico Madero (loan)	16	(0)
2018	Potros UAEM	8	(1)
2019–2021	Tepatitlán	36	(2)
2021–2022	Mineros de Zacatecas	34	(3)
2023–	UNAM	0	(0)
2023–	→ Pumas Tabasco (loan)	14	(2)
- * Club domestic league appearances and goals as of 14 September 2025

Sergio Ceballos Hernández (born 16 February 1994) is a Mexican professional footballer who plays as a midfielder for Liga de Expansión MX club Pumas Tabasco, on loan from UNAM.

== Early life ==
Sergio Ceballos was born on 16 February 1994 in Torreón, Coahuila, Mexico. He joined the youth academy of Santos Laguna in 2009 and progressed through the club's youth ranks before being integrated into the senior setup.

== Club career ==
=== Santos Laguna ===
Ceballos made his professional breakthrough with Santos Laguna, making his first-team debut during the early 2010s. Over multiple seasons with the club he accumulated first-team appearances in Liga MX, contributing as a central/box-to-box midfielder and occasional attacking option.

=== Loans to Puebla and Tampico Madero ===
In 2016 Ceballos joined Club Puebla on loan, making a small number of appearances in the Liga MX first division. The following season (2017–2018) he was loaned to Tampico Madero F.C. of the Ascenso MX, where he saw more regular playing time and furthered his development in a competitive environment.

=== Potros UAEM ===
After leaving Santos Laguna, Ceballos signed for Potros UAEM (2018), appearing in the Ascenso MX and contributing with goals and midfield minutes across the campaign.

=== Tepatitlán ===
In 2019 Ceballos joined C.D. Tepatitlán de Morelos, competing in the Liga de Expansión MX. He was part of the Tepatitlán squad that won the Guardianes 2021 tournament of the Liga de Expansión MX.

=== Mineros de Zacatecas ===
Ceballos signed with Mineros de Zacatecas in 2021, where he became a regular contributor in midfield and added goals during his tenure with the club in the Liga de Expansión MX.

=== UNAM and loan to Pumas Tabasco ===
In 2023 Ceballos joined UNAM and was subsequently loaned to Pumas Tabasco. With Pumas Tabasco he featured across the season in Liga de Expansión MX matches and contributed with appearances and goals for the side.

== Style of play ==
Ceballos is primarily deployed as a central midfielder. Standing at 1.89 m, he offers aerial presence, physicality and versatility to operate in both defensive and advanced midfield roles. Observers note his capacity to link play between lines and contribute on set pieces and transitional phases.

== Career statistics ==
As of 14 September 2025

Season	Club	League			Cup			Continental			Total		
Season	Club	Apps	Goals	Notes	Apps	Goals	Notes	Apps	Goals	Notes	Apps	Goals	Notes
2011–2018	Santos Laguna	44	2		—	—		—	—		44	2	
2016–2017	Puebla (loan)	3	0		—	—		—	—		3	0	
2017–2018	Tampico Madero (loan)	16	0		—	—		—	—		16	0	
2018	Potros UAEM	8	1		—	—		—	—		8	1	
2019–2021	Tepatitlán	36	2		—	—		—	—		36	2	
2021–2022	Mineros de Zacatecas	34	3		—	—		—	—		34	3	
2023–	UNAM	0	0		—	—		—	—		0	0	
2023	Pumas Tabasco (loan)	14	2		—	—		—	—		14	2	
Notes: League appearances and goals only. Statistics current as of 14 September 2025.

== Honours ==
Tepatitlán

- Liga de Expansión MX: Guardianes 2021
