= Juan Pablo Fassi =

Mexican footballer (born 1994)

Personal information
- Full name: Juan Pablo Fassi Álvarez
- Date of birth: 16 August 1994 (age 32)
- Place of birth: Cuauhtémoc, Mexico City, México
- Height: 1.85 m (6 ft 1 in)
- Position: Midfielder

Team information
- Current team: Talleres de Córdoba (sporting director)

Youth career
- Pachuca

Senior career*
Years	Team	Apps	(Gls)
2015–2018	Pachuca	0	(0)
2015–2017	→ Puebla (loan)	0	(0)
2018	→ Fénix (loan)	0	(0)
- * Club domestic league appearances and goals

Juan Pablo Fassi Álvarez (born August 16, 1994) is a retired Mexican footballer who currently is the sporting director of Talleres de Córdoba.

== Career ==
In the summer 2019, at the age of only 24, it was confirmed and announced, that Fassi had been appointed sporting director of Argentina club, Talleres de Córdoba, the club owned by his father, Andrés Fassi.
