= Óscar Arce (Mexican footballer) =

Mexican footballer (born 1995)

Personal information
- Full name: Oscar Moisés Arce Ramírez
- Date of birth: 17 October 1995 (age 31)
- Place of birth: Torreón, Coahuila, México
- Height: 1.76 m (5 ft 9 in)
- Position: Midfielder

Youth career
- 2009–2016: Santos Laguna
- 2013–2014: Club Calor

Senior career*
Years	Team	Apps	(Gls)
2016–2018	Santos Laguna	0	(0)
2016	→ Tampico Madero (loan)	4	(0)
2018–2019	→ Guadalupe (loan)	43	(4)
2019	Herediano	5	(0)
2020	Municipal Grecia	0	(0)
2020	Lobos Zacatepec	0	(0)
2021	San Miguelito	30	(1)
- * Club domestic league appearances and goals as of 1 January 2022

Óscar Moisés Arce Ramírez (born 17 October 1995) is a Mexican footballer who last played for San Miguelito.
