= Gabriel Esparza (footballer) =

Argentine footballer

Personal information
- Full name: Cristian Gabriel Esparza
- Date of birth: 30 January 1993 (age 33)
- Place of birth: Aguilares, Argentina
- Height: 1.68 m (5 ft 6 in)
- Position: Winger

Team information
- Current team: Temperley

Youth career
- San Lorenzo

Senior career*
Years	Team	Apps	(Gls)
2014–2019	San Lorenzo	2	(0)
2015–2016	→ Temperley (loan)	28	(3)
2017	→ Puebla (loan)	21	(1)
2018	→ Guaraní (loan)	31	(5)
2019–2020	Colón	15	(0)
2020–2021	Sol de América	21	(3)
2021	Audax Italiano	3	(0)
2022	The Strongest	37	(2)
2023–2024	Wilstermann	30	(2)
2024–2025	PSBS Biak	4	(0)
2025–	Temperley	30	(0)
- * Club domestic league appearances and goals as of 17:47, 20 April 2026 (UTC)

Cristian Gabriel Esparza (born 30 January 1993) is an Argentine professional footballer who plays as a winger for Primera Nacional club Temperley.
