= José Rocchi =

Mexican footballer (born 1988)

Personal information
- Full name: Jose Silverio Rocchi Guzmán
- Date of birth: 16 July 1988 (age 38)
- Place of birth: Puebla, Mexico
- Height: 1.88 m (6 ft 2 in)
- Position: Goalkeeper

Youth career
- Puebla de La Franja

Senior career*
Years	Team	Apps	(Gls)
2006	Puebla	2	(0)
2006–2007	Masnou		
2007–2008	Gramenet		
2008–2009	Lobos Prepa		
2009–2011	Vicenza	0	(0)
2013–2014	Cerro		
2016–2017	Veracruz	0	(0)
2017–2018	Mons Calpe	4	(0)
- * Club domestic league appearances and goals as of 25 April 2018

Jose Silverio "Evo" Rocchi Guzmán (born 16 July 1988) is a Mexican of Italian descent former football goalkeeper who last played for Mons Calpe in the Gibraltar Premier Division.

== Club career ==
=== Puebla FC ===
Rocchi began his professional career at the local club Puebla FC, for whom he debuted in the Liga de Ascenso Clausura 2006 at only 18 years. He played in the Segunda División Profesional for their youth division, Puebla de La Franja.

Rocchi joined Masnou in November 2006.

=== Vicenza Calcio ===
In July 2009, he was sold to Vicenza Calcio of Italy.
