= 2018 CONCACAF Champions League final =

- Event: 2018 CONCACAF Champions League
Toronto FC	Guadalajara
(Canada)	(Mexico)
3	3
- on aggregate Guadalajara won 4–2 on penalties

First leg
Toronto FC	Guadalajara
1	2
- Date: 17 April 2018
- Venue: BMO Field, Toronto
- Man of the Match: Rodolfo Pizarro (Guadalajara)
- Referee: Ricardo Montero (Costa Rica)
- Attendance: 29,925
- Weather: Cloudy; 2 °C (36 °F); 59% humidity

Second leg
Guadalajara	Toronto FC
1	2
- Date: 25 April 2018
- Venue: Estadio Akron, Guadalajara
- Man of the Match: Rodolfo Cota (Guadalajara)
- Referee: Óscar Moncada (Honduras)
- Attendance: 36,977
- Weather: Clear; 27 °C (81 °F); 13% humidity

The 2018 CONCACAF Champions League final was the final round of the 2018 CONCACAF Champions League, the championship for association football clubs in CONCACAF, representing North America, Central America, and the Caribbean. The 2018 edition was the tenth edition of the CONCACAF Champions League under its current name and first since being re-organized into a single-year tournament.

The final was contested in a two-legged series between Toronto FC from Canada and Guadalajara from Mexico. The first leg was hosted in Toronto on 27 April 2018, at BMO Field in Toronto, while the second leg was hosted in Guadalajara on 25 April 2018, at the Estadio Akron in Guadalajara. Guadalajara won the final 4–2 in a penalty shoot-out after the series was tied 3–3 on aggregate. As a result, they earned the right to represent CONCACAF at the 2018 FIFA Club World Cup, entering at the second round.

== Teams ==
In the following table, final until 2008 were in the CONCACAF Champions' Cup era, since 2009 were in the CONCACAF Champions League era.

Team	Zone	Previous final appearances (bold indicates winners)
(Canada) Toronto FC	North America (NAFU)	None
(Mexico) Guadalajara	North America (NAFU)	3 (**1962**, 1963, 2007)

== Venues ==
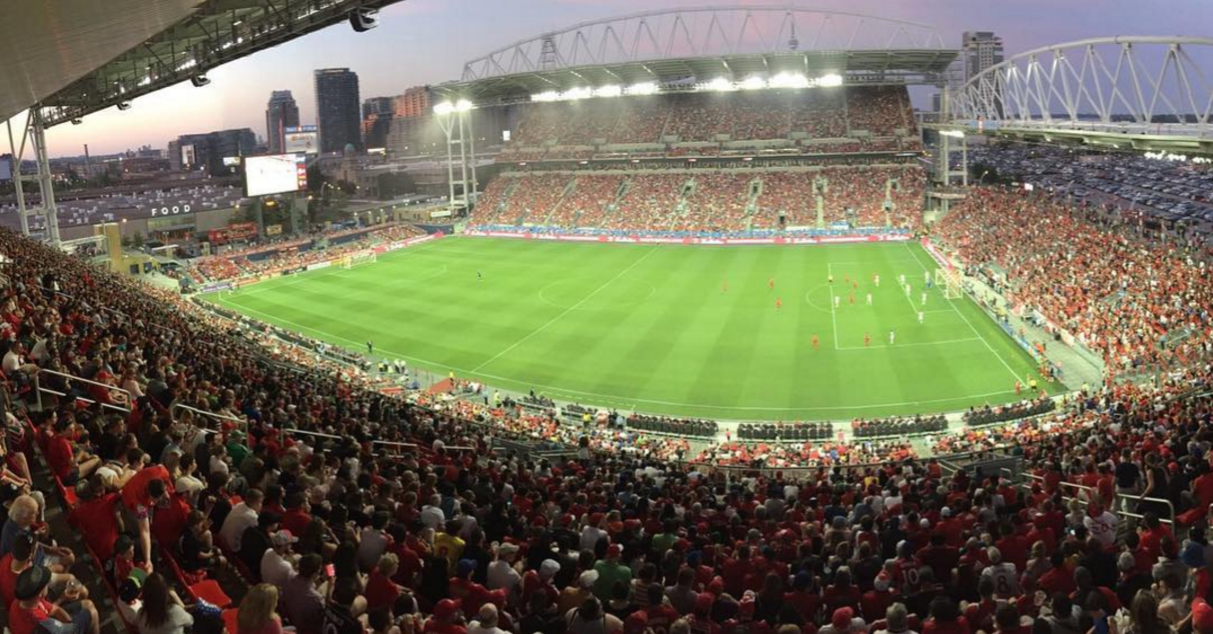
BMO Field in Toronto, Canada hosted the first leg

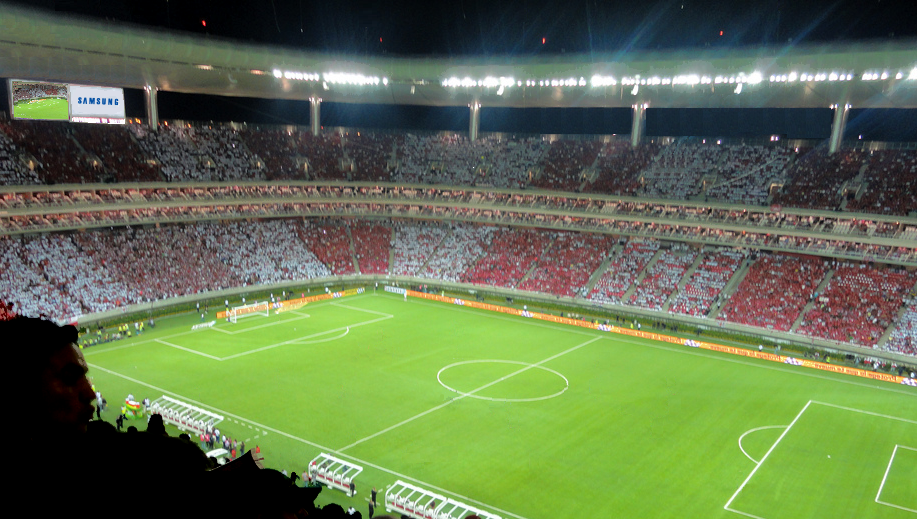
Estadio Akron in Guadalajara, Mexico hosted the second leg

Toronto's BMO Field, with a seating capacity of 30,000, hosted the first leg of the final; it opened in 2007 and was renovated in 2016. The second leg took place in Guadalajara at the Estadio Akron, which opened in 2010 and has a capacity of 48,071. The two stadiums hosting the final were also candidates for the 2026 FIFA World Cup bid shared between Canada, Mexico, and the United States, although only Estadio Akron was eventually selected.

== Background ==
The CONCACAF Champions League was established in 2008 as the continental championship for football clubs in North America, Central America, and the Caribbean, succeeding the CONCACAF Champions' Cup. During its first nine editions, the Champions League consisted of a group stage in summer and autumn followed by a knockout stage during the following spring. Beginning with the 2018 edition of the tournament, the group stage was re-formed as the CONCACAF League and limited to Central American and Caribbean teams. The Champions League was shortened to a two-month knockout tournament between teams from North American and major Central American nations, as well as the winner of the CONCACAF League. The knockout tournament falls within the beginning of Major League Soccer's season, which operates on a summer schedule unlike other football leagues.

Toronto FC were appearing in their first final, and were the second Canadian team to have reached the final after Montreal Impact finished as runners-up in 2015. Only four teams from Major League Soccer (three American, one Canadian) on five occasions had managed to reach the final of the Champions League or the Champions' Cup. In addition to Montreal Impact, LA Galaxy (in 1997) and Real Salt Lake (in 2011) had previously lost in the final. D.C. United (in 1998) and LA Galaxy (in 2000) were the only two MLS teams to have won the competition, doing so during the Champions' Cup era. Of these five finals, four were against Mexican opponents, with only D.C. United managing to win.

Guadalajara had previously appeared in three finals, all in the Champions' Cup era. They won the inaugural edition in 1962, before finishing second the following year after withdrawing from the final. Guadalajara appeared in their next final 44 years later in 2007, losing to fellow Mexican club Pachuca on penalties. Mexican teams were the most successful in the history of the Champions League/Champions' Cup, with a total of 12 teams having won a combined 33 titles. Mexican teams had appeared in every final since 2005, and won every tournament since 2006. There had been a total of eleven all-Mexican finals, all since 2002, including the previous two finals.

== Road to the final ==
Note: In all results below, the score of the finalist is given first (H: home; A: away).

(Canada) Toronto FC				Round	(Mexico) Guadalajara			
Opponent	Agg.	1st leg	2nd leg		Opponent	Agg.	1st leg	2nd leg
(United States) Colorado Rapids	2–0	2–0 (A)	0–0 (H)	Round of 16	(Dominican Republic) Cibao	7–0	2–0 (A)	5–0 (H)
(Mexico) UANL	4–4 (a)	2–1 (H)	2–3 (A)	Quarter-finals	(United States) Seattle Sounders FC	3–1	0–1 (A)	3–0 (H)
(Mexico) América	4–2	3–1 (H)	1–1 (A)	Semi-finals	(United States) New York Red Bulls	1–0	1–0 (H)	0–0 (A)

=== Toronto FC ===
Toronto FC qualified for the 2018 CONCACAF Champions League as winners of the 2016 and 2017 editions of the Canadian Championship. The berth was originally going to be determined via a play-off match in August 2017 between the winners of the two tournaments had another team won either edition, due to the restructuring of the Champions League. Toronto had appeared in four prior Champions Leagues, finishing as high as the semi-finals in 2011–12, losing to eventual runners-up Santos Laguna. The team also won the 2017 MLS Cup and Supporters' Shield, completing MLS's first ever domestic treble, but could not qualify for the Champions League through either because the berths were designated for a team from the United States. Ironically, Toronto's coach, assistant coach, and several starting players were previous part of Chivas USA, an MLS team affiliated and wholly owned by Guadalajara.

Toronto was placed into Pot 1 and drawn against fellow MLS club Colorado Rapids in the Round of 16. Toronto played the first leg away in Commerce City, Colorado on February 20, winning 2–0 during the coldest ever match involving MLS teams, measured at 3 °F (−16 °C) at kickoff and −16 °F (−27 °C) with wind chill. The team advanced into the quarter-finals with a 0–0 draw at home in Toronto, winning the series 2–0 on aggregate. Toronto played Mexican champions Tigres UANL in the quarter-finals and won the home leg 2–1 with a late goal from Jonathan Osorio. The team took a 2–1 lead in the away leg, but two goals from André-Pierre Gignac gave Tigres a 3–2 win and a 4–4 aggregate tie. Toronto advanced on away goals, becoming one of two MLS teams to advance to the semi-finals.

Toronto hosted the first leg of the semi-finals against Club América on April 3, winning 3–1 after two unanswered goals in the 44th and 58th minutes. The match included a half-time altercation between Toronto and América players, in which América coach Miguel Herrera accused Toronto Police of assaulting his players. To prepare for the away leg at Estadio Azteca in Mexico City, Toronto moved a league fixture and spent several days acclimating to the altitude in Pachuca. In the away leg, Toronto took an early lead in the 12th minute, but América equalized on a last-minute penalty, bringing the aggregate score to 4–2. Toronto became the third Major League Soccer team and second Canadian team to advance to a Champions League final, following Real Salt Lake in 2011 and the Montreal Impact in 2015.

=== Guadalajara ===
C.D. Guadalajara, also known as Chivas, qualified for the 2018 CONCACAF Champions League as winners of the 2017 Clausura in Liga MX. The 2018 tournament was the team's second under the current Champions League format, having finished in the group stage in 2012–13. Under manager Matías Almeyda, Chivas advanced to seven finals in various tournaments since 2015.

Guadalajara was drawn with Cibao FC, winners of the 2017 CONCACAF League, in the Round of 16. The team stayed in Puerto Plata, approximately 45 miles (72 km) from the stadium in Santiago de los Caballeros, due to a tobacco growers' conference that filled available hotel space. Guadalajara won the first leg in the Dominican Republic by a 2–0 margin and the second leg 5–0. In the quarter-finals, Guadalajara played Seattle Sounders FC of MLS and lost the first leg 1–0 away in Seattle. The return leg remained scoreless until the second half, which saw three goals from Chivas to win the match 3–0. Chivas advanced to the final on a 1–0 aggregate win over the New York Red Bulls in the semi-finals. Isaác Brizuela scored the lone goal of the series in the first leg, played in Guadalajara, while the second leg in New Jersey ended scoreless.

== Format ==
The final was played in a home-and-away two-legged series, with the team with the better performance in previous rounds hosting the second leg.

If the aggregate score was tied after the second leg, the away goals rule would be applied, and if still tied, a penalty shoot-out would be used to determine the winner.

=== Performance ranking ===
Pos	Team	Pld	W	D	L	GF	GA	GD	Pts	Host
1	(Mexico) Guadalajara	6	4	1	1	11	1	+10	**13**	Second leg
2	(Canada) Toronto FC	6	3	2	1	10	6	+4	**11**	First leg

Source: CONCACAF
Rules for classification: 1) Points; 2) Goal difference; 3) Goals scored; 4) Away goals scored; 5) Wins; 6) Away wins; 7) Drawing of lots.

== Broadcasting ==
Both legs of the final were broadcast in English on TSN2 in Canada and in Spanish on Univision Deportes in the United States, where it was also aired on sister station UniMás. Fox Sports broadcast in Mexico and the rest of Latin America. Go90 also streamed the games in English in the United States.

== Matches ==
=== First leg ===
==== Summary ====
The first leg was hosted in Toronto at BMO Field on 17 April, where the kickoff temperature was 1 °C (34 °F) and snow flurries fell through the match. Prior to the match, the new Champions League trophy was unveiled by CONCACAF officials.

Chivas took the lead in the second minute on a goal scored by Rodolfo Pizarro, during an attack that originated from a throw-in by Isaác Brizuela, who assisted Pizarro's goal. Toronto's Jonathan Osorio scored the equalizing goal in the 19th minute, finishing an attack started by Mark Delgado deep in the midfield. Toronto took control of possession and shooting chances through to halftime, but failed to score after two saves by Chivas's backup goalkeeper Miguel Jiménez. During the first half, Toronto's Jozy Altidore vomited several times on the pitch — the cause being a "stomach bug" that several Toronto players reportedly received in the semi-finals against América. Chivas regained partial control of the match in the second half, alternating attacks with Toronto as both teams sought to take the lead. Chivas scored the match's winning goal in the 72nd minute on a free kick by Alan Pulido, which was misread by goalkeeper Alex Bono and ended up in the far side of the goal. Toronto failed to finish in its later attacks, which also included a no-call penalty for an alleged foul on Sebastian Giovinco.

==== Details ====
17 April 2018
20:15 UTC−4

Toronto FC (Canada)	1–2	(Mexico) Guadalajara
Osorio 19'	Report	Pizarro 2'; Pulido 72'

BMO Field, Toronto
Attendance: 29,925
Referee: Ricardo Montero (Costa Rica)

**Toronto FC**	**Guadalajara**

GK	25	(United States) Alex Bono
CB	9	(Netherlands) Gregory van der Wiel
CB	3	(United States) Drew Moor
CB	23	(Democratic Republic of the Congo) Chris Mavinga	(substituted off) 46'
RM	96	(Brazil) Auro Jr.
CM	18	(United States) Mark Delgado	(substituted off) 81'
CM	4	(United States) Michael Bradley (c)
CM	21	(Canada) Jonathan Osorio
LM	5	(Canada) Ashtone Morgan	(substituted off) 67'
CF	17	(United States) Jozy Altidore
CF	10	(Italy) Sebastian Giovinco
Substitutes:
GK	1	(United States) Clint Irwin
DF	2	(United States) Justin Morrow	(substituted on) 67'
DF	15	(United States) Eriq Zavaleta	(substituted on) 46'
MF	8	(Spain) Ager Aketxe	(substituted on) 81'
MF	26	(Liechtenstein) Nicolas Hasler
FW	22	(Canada) Jordan Hamilton
FW	87	(Canada) Tosaint Ricketts
Manager:
(United States) Greg Vanney

GK	34	(Mexico) Miguel Jiménez
RB	11	(Mexico) Isaác Brizuela	(yellow card) 64'
CB	3	(Mexico) Carlos Salcido (c)
CB	2	(Mexico) Oswaldo Alanís
LB	88	(Mexico) Alejandro Mayorga		(substituted off) 71'
CM	7	(Mexico) Orbelín Pineda
CM	25	(Mexico) Michael Pérez
RW	24	(Mexico) Carlos Cisneros
AM	9	(Mexico) Alan Pulido		(substituted off) 90+4'
LW	20	(Mexico) Rodolfo Pizarro
CF	89	(Mexico) Jesús Godínez		(substituted off) 77'
Substitutes:
GK	1	(Mexico) Antonio Rodríguez
DF	28	(Mexico) Miguel Basulto
MF	10	(Mexico) Javier López		(substituted on) 71'
MF	13	(Mexico) Gael Sandoval
MF	23	(Mexico) Fernando Beltrán
FW	14	(Mexico) Ángel Zaldívar		(substituted on) 77'
FW	18	(Mexico) José Macías		(substituted on) 90+4'
Manager:
(Argentina) Matías Almeyda

Man of the Match:
Rodolfo Pizarro (Guadalajara)

Assistant referees:
Juan Carlos Mora (Costa Rica)
Ainsley Rochard (Trinidad and Tobago)
Fourth official:
Saíd Martínez (Honduras)

**Match rules**

- 90 minutes.
- Seven named substitutes, of which up to three may be used.

==== Statistics ====
Statistic	Toronto FC	Guadalajara
Goals scored	1	2
Total shots	19	15
Shots on target	13	7
Saves	5	12
Ball possession	52%	48%
Corner kicks	11	4
Fouls committed	11	15
Offsides	1	4
Yellow cards	0	1
Red cards	0	0

=== Second leg ===
==== Summary ====
The second leg was hosted in Guadalajara at Estadio Akron on 25 April. Toronto fielded some midfielders and wingbacks in defensive roles due to injuries, including captain Michael Bradley and right back Gregory van der Wiel; midfielder Víctor Vázquez returned from injury to start the match. Chivas extended their aggregate lead to 3–1 on a goal scored by Orbelín Pineda in the 19th minute. Toronto responded with two goals in the 25th and 44th minutes by Jozy Altidore and Sebastian Giovinco, bringing the series level on aggregate. The 2–1 lead for Toronto held through to the end of the second half, despite chances from both teams, including a missed shot by Toronto's Mark Delgado. The final was decided in a penalty shoot-out, which was won 4–2 by Guadalajara after four rounds. All four of Chivas's penalty takers scored, while Toronto's Jonathan Osorio and Michael Bradley both missed.

==== Details ====
25 April 2018
20:30 UTC−5

Guadalajara (Mexico)	1–2	(Canada) Toronto FC
Pineda 19'	Report	Altidore 25'; Giovinco 44'
Penalties
Alanís (penalty scored); Godínez (penalty scored); Pulido (penalty scored); Zaldívar (penalty scored)	4–2	(penalty scored) Giovinco; (penalty missed) Osorio; (penalty scored) Delgado; (penalty missed) Bradley

Estadio Akron, Guadalajara
Attendance: 36,977
Referee: Óscar Moncada (Honduras)

**Guadalajara**	**Toronto FC**

GK	30	(Mexico) Rodolfo Cota
RB	11	(Mexico) Isaác Brizuela	(substituted off) 68'
CB	4	(Mexico) Jair Pereira
CB	2	(Mexico) Oswaldo Alanís
LB	6	(Mexico) Edwin Hernández
CM	3	(Mexico) Carlos Salcido (c)	(substituted off) 55'
CM	25	(Mexico) Michael Pérez	(substituted off) 68'
RW	24	(Mexico) Carlos Cisneros
AM	7	(Mexico) Orbelín Pineda
LW	20	(Mexico) Rodolfo Pizarro
CF	9	(Mexico) Alan Pulido
Substitutes:
GK	34	(Mexico) Miguel Jiménez
DF	28	(Mexico) Miguel Basulto
MF	10	(Mexico) Javier López	(substituted on) 68'
MF	13	(Mexico) Gael Sandoval
MF	23	(Mexico) Fernando Beltrán
FW	14	(Mexico) Ángel Zaldívar	(substituted on) 68'
FW	89	(Mexico) Jesús Godínez	(substituted on) 55'
Manager:
(Argentina) Matías Almeyda

GK	25	(United States) Alex Bono
RB	96	(Brazil) Auro Jr.	(yellow card) 84'
CB	9	(Netherlands) Gregory van der Wiel
CB	4	(United States) Michael Bradley (c)
LB	5	(Canada) Ashtone Morgan
RM	26	(Liechtenstein) Nicolas Hasler		(substituted off) 57'
CM	18	(United States) Mark Delgado
CM	21	(Canada) Jonathan Osorio
LM	7	(Spain) Víctor Vázquez		(substituted off) 71'
CF	17	(United States) Jozy Altidore		(substituted off) 85'
CF	10	(Italy) Sebastian Giovinco	(yellow card) 43'
Substitutes:
GK	1	(United States) Clint Irwin
DF	15	(United States) Eriq Zavaleta
MF	8	(Spain) Ager Aketxe		(substituted on) 85'
MF	14	(Canada) Jay Chapman		(substituted on) 71'
MF	54	(Canada) Ryan Telfer
FW	22	(Canada) Jordan Hamilton		(substituted on) 57'
FW	87	(Canada) Tosaint Ricketts
Manager:
(United States) Greg Vanney

Man of the Match:
Rodolfo Cota (Guadalajara)

Assistant referees:
Gerson López (Guatemala)
Christian Ramírez (Honduras)
Fourth official:
Kimbell Ward (Saint Kitts and Nevis)

**Match rules**

- 90 minutes.
- Penalty shoot-out if tied on aggregate and away goals.
- Seven named substitutes, of which up to three may be used.

==== Statistics ====
Statistic	Guadalajara	Toronto FC
Goals scored	1	2
Total shots	23	9
Shots on target	8	3
Saves	1	7
Ball possession	55%	45%
Corner kicks	6	4
Fouls committed	9	16
Offsides	1	0
Yellow cards	0	2
Red cards	0	0

== Post-match ==
Guadalajara's win was the thirteenth consecutive Champions League or Champions' Cup title won by a Mexican team. As a result, Guadalajara qualified for the 2018 FIFA Club World Cup as CONCACAF's representative.

Toronto FC's Jonathan Osorio and Sebastian Giovinco won the tournament's Golden Boot and Golden Ball, respectively. Guadalajara's Rodolfo Cota and Rodolfo Pizarro won the tournament's Golden Glove and the Best Young Player, respectively.
