= 2019–20 C.D. Guadalajara season =

Guadalajara
2019–20 season
- Manager: Tomás Boy
- Stadium: Estadio Akron
- Apertura: 12th
- Top goalscorer: Alan Pulido (4 goals)
- Highest home attendance: 39,313 (vs UANL, 28 July 2019)
- Lowest home attendance: 10,210 (vs UAT, 4 September 2019)
- Average home league attendance: 20,890
- Biggest win: Guadalajara 3–0 Atlético San Luis (10 August 2019)
- Biggest defeat: Santos Laguna 3–0 Guadalajara (21 July 2019)
Home colours	Away colours
- All statistics correct as of 19 September 2019.

The 2019–20 C.D. Guadalajara season is the 113th season in the football club's history and the 95th consecutive season in the top flight of Mexican football.

== Coaching staff ==
Position	Name
Head coach	(Mexico) Tomás Boy
Assistant coaches	(Mexico) Armando Camacho
Assistant coaches	(Mexico) Joaquín Moreno
Assistant coaches	(Mexico) José Luis Malibrán
Kinesiologists	(Mexico) Antonio Jiménez
Kinesiologists	(Argentina) Gustavo Witte
Doctor	(Mexico) Jesús Robles

== Transfers ==
=== In ===
N	Pos.	Nat.	Name	Age	Moving from	Type	Transfer window	Source
3	DF	(Mexico)	Oswaldo Alanís	18 March 1989 (aged 30)	(Spain) Real Oviedo	Transfer	Summer	
4	GK	(Mexico)	José Antonio Rodríguez	4 July 1992 (aged 26)	BUAP	Loan return	Summer	
14	DF	(Mexico)	Antonio Briseño	5 February 1994 (aged 25)	(Portugal) Feirense	Transfer	Summer	
24	FW	(Mexico)	Oribe Peralta	12 January 1984 (aged 35)	América	Transfer	Summer	

=== Out ===
N	Pos.	Nat.	Name	Age	Moving to	Type	Transfer window	Source
4	DF	(Mexico)	Jair Pereira	7 July 1986 (aged 32)	Querétaro	Transfer	Summer	
5	DF	(Mexico)	Hedgardo Marín	21 February 1993 (aged 26)	Zacatecas	Loan	Summer	
23	FW	(Mexico)	Jesús Godínez	20 January 1997 (aged 22)	León	Loan	Summer	
28	DF	(Mexico)	Miguel Basulto	7 January 1992 (aged 27)	Zacatepec	Loan	Summer	

== Competitions ==
=== Overview ===
Competition	First match	Last match	Starting round	Record							
Competition	First match	Last match	Starting round	Pld	W	D	L	GF	GA	GD	Win %
Torneo Apertura	21 July 2019		Matchday 1	8	3	2	3	12	11	+1	37.50
Copa MX	7 August 2019		Group stage	2	1	0	1	2	2	+0	50.00
Torneo Clausura			Matchday 1	0	0	0	0	0	0	+0	—
Total				10	4	2	4	14	13	+1	40.00

Last updated: 19 September 2019
Source: Mediotiempo.com

=== Torneo Apertura ===
==== League table ====
Pos	Team	Pld	W	D	L	GF	GA	GD	Pts	Qualification or relegation
8	Monterrey (C)	18	8	3	7	27	23	+4	27	Advance to Liguilla (Note: The first 8 places in the table qualified for the Liguilla. The last ranked team in the relegation table could qualify for the Liguilla in the Apertura tournament.)
9	Pachuca	18	7	4	7	32	26	+6	25	
10	Guadalajara	18	7	4	7	28	28	0	25	
11	Tijuana	18	7	3	8	26	36	−10	24	
12	Cruz Azul	18	5	8	5	25	24	+1	23	

Source: Liga MX
Rules for classification: 1) Points; 2) Goal difference; 3) Number of goals scored; 4) Head-to-head results between tied teams; 5) Number of goals scored away; 6) Highest relegation coefficient; 7) Fair Play points
(C) Champions

==== Results summary ====
Overall								Home						Away					
Pld	W	D	L	GF	GA	GD	Pts	W	D	L	GF	GA	GD	W	D	L	GF	GA	GD
8	3	2	3	12	11	+1	11	3	0	1	7	2	+5	0	2	2	5	9	−4

Last updated: 19 September 2019.
Source: LigaMX

==== Result round by round ====
Round	1	2	3	4	5	6	7	8	9	10	11	12	13	14	15	16	17
Ground	A	H	A	H	A	H	†	A	H	H	A	H	A	H	A	H	A
Result	L	W	D	W	L	L	†	D	W								
Position	19	9	10	6	11	12	14	15	12								

Updated to match(es) played on 19 September 2019. Source: Mediotiempo.com
A = Away; H = Home; W = Win; D = Draw; L = Loss
Notes: † indicates team rested that round

==== Matches ====
21 July 2019 1	Santos Laguna	3–0	Guadalajara	Torreón
18:45	Lozano 40'; Dória 47'; Furch 77'	Report		Stadium: Estadio Corona; Attendance: 26,572; Referee: Jorge Isaac Rojas

28 July 2019 2	Guadalajara	2–0	UANL	Zapopan
19:00	Briseño 8'; Pulido 90+5'	Report		Stadium: Estadio Akron; Attendance: 39,313; Referee: Oscar Macías

2 August 2019 3	Puebla	1–1	Guadalajara	Puebla
19:00	Cavallini 43'	Report	Alanís 8'	Stadium: Estadio Cuauhtémoc; Attendance: 27,611; Referee: Marco Antonio Ortiz Nava

10 August 2019 4	Guadalajara	3–0	Atlético San Luis	Zapopan
21:05	López 14'; Pulido 64'; Alanís 85'	Report		Stadium: Estadio Akron; Attendance: 31,527; Referee: Fernando Hernández

17 August 2019 5	León	4–3	Guadalajara	León
19:00	Macías 18', 63'; Mena 44'; Moreno 71'	Report	Pulido 37', 79'; Vega 90+4'	Stadium: Estadio León; Attendance: 26,561; Referee: Jorge Isaac Rojas

25 August 2019 6	Guadalajara	1–2	Necaxa	Zapopan
17:00	Villalpando 64'	Report	Salas 10'; Gallegos 40'	Stadium: Estadio Akron; Attendance: 30,912; Referee: Roberto García Orozco

31 August 2019 8	Guadalajara	1–1	Cruz Azul	Mexico City
21:05	Rodríguez 10'	Report	Ponce 41'	Stadium: Estadio Azteca; Attendance: 23,692; Referee: Fernando Guerrero

14 September 2019 9	Guadalajara	1–0	Atlas	Zapopan
19:00	Vega 63'	Report		Stadium: Estadio Akron; Attendance: 37,168; Referee: César Arturo Ramos

== Copa MX ==
=== Group stage ===
Pos	Team	Pld	W	D	L	GF	GA	GD	Pts	Qualification
1	Guadalajara	3	2	0	1	4	2	+2	6	Advance to knockout stage
2	UAT	3	1	1	1	2	3	−1	4	Possible knockout stage
3	Santos Laguna	2	0	1	1	2	3	−1	1	

Updated to match(es) played on 1 October 2019. Source: Copa MX
Rules for classification: Tiebreakers

7 August 2019 1	Guadalajara	2–1	Santos Laguna	Zapopan
19:00	Vega 82', 85'	Report	Dória 49'	Stadium: Estadio Akron; Attendance: 18,931; Referee: Mario Humberto Vargas

4 September 2019 2	Guadalajara	0–1	UAT	Zapopan
21:00		Report	Vilchis 86'	Stadium: Estadio Akron; Attendance: 10,210; Referee: Juan Esquivel

== Statistics ==
=== Squad statistics ===
No.	Pos	Nat	Player	Total		Apertura		Copa MX		Clausura	
No.	Pos	Nat	Player	Apps	Goals	Apps	Goals	Apps	Goals	Apps	Goals
1	GK	(Mexico)	Raúl Gudiño	3	0	2	0	1	0	0	0
2	DF	(Mexico)	Josecarlos Van Rankin	6	0	6	0	0	0	0	0
3	DF	(Mexico)	Oswaldo Alanís	6	2	6	2	0	0	0	0
4	GK	(Mexico)	José Antonio Rodríguez	7	0	6	0	1	0	0	0
6	MF	(Mexico)	Dieter Villalpando	9	1	7	1	2	0	0	0
7	FW	(Mexico)	Alexis Vega	8	4	7	2	1	2	0	0
9	FW	(Mexico)	Alan Pulido	8	4	8	4	0	0	0	0
10	MF	(Mexico)	Eduardo López	7	1	7	1	0	0	0	0
11	MF	(Mexico)	Isaác Brizuela	9	0	8	0	1	0	0	0
13	MF	(Mexico)	Gael Sandoval	5	0	3	0	2	0	0	0
14	DF	(Mexico)	Antonio Briseño	8	1	7	1	1	0	0	0
15	DF	(Mexico)	Alejandro Mayorga	1	0	1	0	0	0	0	0
16	DF	(Mexico)	Miguel Ángel Ponce	7	1	6	1	1	0	0	0
17	DF	(Mexico)	Jesús Sánchez	5	0	3	0	2	0	0	0
19	FW	(Mexico)	Luis Madrigal	1	0	0	0	1	0	0	0
20	MF	(Mexico)	Jesús Molina	8	0	8	0	0	0	0	0
21	DF	(Mexico)	Hiram Mier	1	0	1	0	0	0	0	0
23	DF	(Mexico)	Carlos Villanueva	2	0	0	0	2	0	0	0
24	FW	(Mexico)	Oribe Peralta	7	0	6	0	1	0	0	0
25	MF	(Mexico)	Michael Pérez	4	0	4	0	0	0	0	0
26	MF	(Mexico)	Fernando Beltrán	5	0	3	0	2	0	0	0
29	MF	(Mexico)	Alejandro Zendejas	3	0	2	0	1	0	0	0
30	FW	(Mexico)	José González	3	0	1	0	2	0	0	0
31	MF	(Mexico)	Alan Cervantes	7	0	6	0	1	0	0	0
33	FW	(Mexico)	César Huerta	4	0	2	0	2	0	0	0
185	DF	(Mexico)	Gilberto Sepúlveda	4	0	2	0	2	0	0	0
187	MF	(Mexico)	Alan Torres	2	0	0	0	2	0	0	0

Last updated: 19 September 2019
Source: Mediotiempo.com

=== Goals ===
As of 19 September 2019

Rank	Player	Position	Apertura	Copa MX	Clausura	Total
1	(Mexico) Alan Pulido	FW	4	0	0	4
1	(Mexico) Alexis Vega	FW	2	2	0	4
3	(Mexico) Oswaldo Alanís	DF	2	0	0	2
4	(Mexico) Antonio Briseño	DF	1	0	0	1
4	(Mexico) Eduardo López	MF	1	0	0	1
4	(Mexico) Miguel Ángel Ponce	DF	1	0	0	1
4	(Mexico) Dieter Villalpando	MF	1	0	0	1

=== Clean sheets ===
As of 19 September 2019

Rank	Name	Apertura	Copa MX	Clausura	Total
1	(Mexico) José Antonio Rodríguez	2	0	0	2
2	(Mexico) Raúl Gudiño	1	0	0	1

=== Disciplinary record ===
N	P	Nat.	Name	Apertura			Copa MX			Total			Notes
N	P	Nat.	Name	Yellow card	Second yellow card	Red card	Yellow card	Second yellow card	Red card	Yellow card	Second yellow card	Red card	Notes
16	DF	(Mexico)	Miguel Ángel Ponce	1	1					1	1		
20	MF	(Mexico)	Jesús Molina	3						3			
14	DF	(Mexico)	Antonio Briseño	3						3			
25	MF	(Mexico)	Michael Pérez	2						2			
2	DF	(Mexico)	Josecarlos Van Rankin	2						2			
13	MF	(Mexico)	Gael Sandoval	2						2			
24	FW	(Mexico)	Oribe Peralta	1						1			
29	MF	(Mexico)	Alejandro Zendejas	1						1			
185	DF	(Mexico)	Gilberto Sepúlveda	1						1			
17	DF	(Mexico)	Jesús Sánchez	1						1			
7	FW	(Mexico)	Alexis Vega	1						1			
11	MF	(Mexico)	Isaác Brizuela	1						1			
33	FW	(Mexico)	César Huerta				1			1			
6	MF	(Mexico)	Dieter Villalpando				1			1			
1	GK	(Mexico)	Raúl Gudiño				1			1			

Last updated: 19 September 2019
Source: Liga MX
Only competitive matches
(yellow card) = Number of bookings; (second yellow card) = Number of sending offs after a second yellow card; (red card) = Number of sending offs by a direct red card.
