= 2018–19 C.D. Guadalajara season =

Guadalajara
2018–19 season
- Owner: Jorge Vergara
- Chairman: Mariano Varela
- Manager: Alberto Coyote
- Stadium: Estadio Akron
- Apertura: 11th
- Clausura: 14th
- Apertura Copa MX: Round of 16
- FIFA Club World Cup: 6th
- Top goalscorer: League: Alan Pulido (7 goals); All: Alan Pulido (9 goals)
- Highest home attendance: 37,412 (vs Cruz Azul, 28 July 2018)
- Lowest home attendance: 9,326 (vs Oaxaca, 14 August 2018)
- Average home league attendance: 25,366
- Biggest win: Atlas 0-3 Guadalajara (16 February 2019)
- Biggest defeat: Guadalajara 1–3 UNAM (26 September 2018)
Home colours	Away colours	Third colours
- All statistics correct as of 13 January 2019.

The 2018–19 C.D. Guadalajara season is the 112th season in the football club's history and the 94th consecutive season in the top flight of Mexican football. In addition to the Liga MX and Copa MX, the club will also compete in the FIFA Club World Cup.

== Coaching staff ==
Position	Name
Head coach	(Mexico) Alberto Coyote
Assistant coaches	(Mexico) Fernando Huerta
Assistant coaches	(Mexico) Armando Camacho
Goalkeeper coach	(Mexico) Jesús Alfaro
Fitness coaches	(Argentina) Ezequiel Barril
Fitness coaches	(Paraguay) Miguel Denis
Kinesiologists	(Mexico) Antonio Jiménez
Kinesiologists	(Argentina) Gustavo Witte
Doctor	(Mexico) Jesús Robles

== Players ==
=== Squad information ===
No.	Pos.	Nat.	Name	Date of birth (age)	Signed in	Previous club
Goalkeepers
1	GK	(Mexico)	Raúl Gudiño	22 April 1996 (aged 22)	2018	(Portugal) Porto
34	GK	(Mexico)	Miguel Jiménez	14 March 1990 (aged 28)	2016	(Mexico) Coras
35	GK	(Mexico)	Antonio Torres	23 May 1996 (aged 22)	2017	(Mexico) Youth System
Defenders
2	DF	(Mexico)	Josecarlos Van Rankin	14 May 1993 (aged 25)	2018	(Mexico) UNAM
3	DF	(Mexico)	Alejandro Mayorga	29 May 1997 (aged 21)	2019 (Winter)	(Mexico) Necaxa
4	DF	(Mexico)	Jair Pereira (Captain)	7 July 1986 (aged 31)	2014 (Winter)	(Mexico) Cruz Azul
5	DF	(Mexico)	Hedgardo Marín	21 February 1993 (aged 25)	2013 (Winter)	(Mexico) Youth System
16	DF	(Mexico)	Miguel Ponce	12 April 1989 (aged 29)	2018	(Mexico) Necaxa
17	DF	(Mexico)	Jesús Sánchez	31 August 1989 (aged 28)	2010	(Mexico) Youth System
21	DF	(Mexico)	Hiram Mier	25 August 1989 (aged 28)	2019 (Winter)	(Mexico) Querétaro
27	DF	(Mexico)	Carlos Villanueva	7 April 1994 (aged 24)	2019 (Winter)	(Mexico) Necaxa
28	DF	(Mexico)	Juan Basulto	7 January 1992 (aged 26)	2013 (Winter)	(Mexico) Youth System
Midfielders
6	MF	(Mexico)	Dieter Villalpando	4 August 1991 (aged 26)	2019 (Winter)	(Mexico) Necaxa
10	MF	(Mexico)	Eduardo López	17 September 1994 (aged 23)	2013 (Winter)	(Mexico) Youth System
11	MF	(Mexico)	Isaác Brizuela	28 August 1990 (aged 27)	2015 (Winter)	(Mexico) Toluca
13	MF	(Mexico)	Gael Sandoval	5 November 1995 (aged 22)	2018 (Winter)	(Mexico) Santos
20	MF	(Mexico)	Jesús Molina	29 March 1988 (aged 30)	2019 (Winter)	(Mexico) Monterrey
24	MF	(Mexico)	Carlos Cisneros	30 August 1993 (aged 24)	2013 (Winter)	(Mexico) Youth System
25	MF	(Mexico)	Michael Pérez	14 February 1993 (aged 25)	2012	(Mexico) Youth System
29	MF	(Mexico)	Alejandro Zendejas	14 February 1993 (aged 25)	2018	(Mexico) Zacatepec
31	MF	(Mexico)	Alan Cervantes	17 January 1998 (aged 20)	2018 (Winter)	(Mexico) León
Forwards
7	FW	(Mexico)	Alexis Vega	25 November 1997 (aged 20)	2019 (Winter)	(Mexico) Toluca
9	FW	(Mexico)	Alan Pulido	8 March 1991 (aged 27)	2016	(Greece) Olympiacos
18	FW	(Mexico)	Ronaldo Cisneros	8 January 1997 (aged 21)	2019 (Winter)	(Mexico) Zacatepec
19	FW	(Mexico)	Luis Madrigal	10 February 1993 (aged 25)	2019 (Winter)	(Mexico) Oaxaca
23	FW	(Mexico)	José de Jesús Godínez	20 January 1997 (aged 21)	2017 (Winter)	(Mexico) Youth System

Players and squad numbers last updated on 18 January 2019.
Note: Flags indicate national team as has been defined under FIFA eligibility rules. Players may hold more than one non-FIFA nationality.

== Competitions ==
=== Overview ===
Competition	First match	Last match	Starting round	Final position	Record							
Competition	First match	Last match	Starting round	Final position	Pld	W	D	L	GF	GA	GD	Win %
Torneo Apertura	21 July 2018	24 November 2018	Matchday 1	11th	17	5	5	7	21	22	−1	29.41
Apertura Copa MX	31 July 2018	29 August 2018	Group stage	Round of 16	5	3	1	1	7	6	+1	60.00
Torneo Clausura	5 January 2019		Matchday 1		7	4	2	1	10	4	+6	57.14
Clausura Copa MX	8 January 2019	2019	Group stage		3	2	1	0	6	2	+4	66.67
FIFA Club World Cup	15 December 2018	18 December 2018	Quarter-finals	6th	2	0	1	1	3	4	−1	0.00
Total					34	14	10	10	47	38	+9	41.18

Last updated: 13 January 2019
Source: Mediotiempo.com

=== Torneo Apertura ===
==== League table ====
Pos	Team	Pld	W	D	L	GF	GA	GD	Pts
9	Morelia	17	7	4	6	23	26	−3	25
10	Pachuca	17	6	6	5	26	18	+8	24
11	Guadalajara	17	5	5	7	21	22	−1	20
12	Puebla	17	5	5	7	23	30	−7	20
13	BUAP	17	5	4	8	21	25	−4	19

Source: Liga MX
Rules for classification: 1) Points; 2) Goal difference; 3) Number of goals scored; 4) Head-to-head results between tied teams; 5) Number of goals scored away; 6) Highest relegation coefficient; 7) Fair Play points

==== Results summary ====
Overall								Home						Away					
Pld	W	D	L	GF	GA	GD	Pts	W	D	L	GF	GA	GD	W	D	L	GF	GA	GD
17	5	5	7	21	22	−1	20	1	1	6	6	12	−6	4	4	1	15	10	+5

Last updated: 8 December 2018.
Source: LigaMX

==== Result round by round ====
Round	1	2	3	4	5	6	7	8	9	10	11	12	13	14	15	16	17
Ground	A	H	A	H	A	H	A	H	A	H	A	H	A	H	A	A	H
Result	L	L	D	L	W	W	W	L	W	D	D	L	D	L	D	W	L
Position	11	15	14	17	12	10	10	12	9	10	9	12	11	12	12	11	11

Updated to match(es) played on 8 December 2018. Source: LigaMX
A = Away; H = Home; W = Win; D = Draw; L = Loss

==== Matches ====
21 July 2018 1	Tijuana	2–1	Guadalajara	Tijuana
19:00	Lucero (yellow card) 41', (goal) 53'; Fuentes (yellow card) 58'; Rivero 74'; Mendoza (yellow card) 79'	Report	Pereira (yellow card) 42'; Van Rankin 59'; Pérez (red card) 79'	Stadium: Caliente; Referee: Jorge Antonio Pérez Durán

28 July 2018 2	Guadalajara	0–1	Cruz Azul	Zapopan
21:06 CDT	Van Rankin (yellow card) 30'; Pereira (yellow card) 62'	Liga MX; Referee Report	Cauteruccio 46'; Marcone (yellow card) 51'; Aguilar (yellow card) 60'	Stadium: Estadio Akron; Attendance: 37,412; Referee: Fernando Hernández Gómez

5 August 2018 3	Toluca	2–2	Guadalajara	Toluca
12:00	Vega 3'; Mendoza 69'	Report	Zaldívar 42' 50'	Stadium: Nemesio Díez; Attendance: 22,226; Referee: César Arturo Ramos

12 August 2018 4	Guadalajara	1–2	Santos Laguna	Zapopan
21:00	Brizuela 26'; Van Rankin (yellow card) 40'; Brizuela (yellow card) 60'	Report	Martínez (yellow card) 35'; Dória 40'; Nervo (yellow card) 51'; J. Rodríguez 78'	Stadium: Akron; Attendance: 26,913; Referee: Marco Antonio Ortiz

17 August 2018 5	Veracruz	0–2	Guadalajara	Veracruz
21:00 CST	Abrigo (yellow card) 32'; Menéndez 43'; Noya (red card) 57'; Mares (yellow card) 64'; Ruíz (yellow card) 68'; Chávez (yellow card) 76'	Report	López 12', 24'; Hernández 32'; Brizuela 32'	Stadium: Estadio Luis "Pirata" Fuente; Referee: Oscar Macías Romo

21 August 2018 6	Guadalajara	1–0	Necaxa	Zapopan
21:00	Zaldívar 24'	Report		Stadium: Estadio Akron; Referee: Jorge Antonio Pérez Durán

24 August 2018 7	Atlas	0–1	Guadalajara	Guadalajara
21:00		Report	Pineda 63'	Stadium: Jalisco; Attendance: 37,921; Referee: César Arturo Ramos

1 September 2018 8	Guadalajara	1–3	Pachuca	Zapopan
21:00	Zaldívar 28'	Report	Jara 8', (yellow card) 51', (goal) 70'; Barreiro (yellow card) 26'; P. López 31'; J. Hernández (yellow card) 79'; Peña (yellow card) 90'	Stadium: Estadio Akron; Referee: Eduardo Galvan Basulto

15 September 2018 9	Monterrey	2–4	Guadalajara	Guadalupe
21:06	Pabón 49'; Medina 65'	Report	Van Rankin 43'; Marín 67'; Sandoval 76'; Cervantes 84'	Stadium: Estadio BBVA Bancomer; Attendance: 37,812; Referee: Francisco Chacón

23 September 2018 10	Guadalajara	1–1	Querétaro	Zapopan
21:00	Zaldívar (yellow card) 20'; Marín (yellow card) 29'; Beltrán (yellow card) 66'; Pulido 83'	Report	Mier (yellow card) 37'; Corral (yellow card) 42'; Güémez (yellow card) 68' da Silva 90+3', (yellow card) 90+4'	Stadium: Estadio Akron; Referee: Marco Antonio Ortiz Nava

30 September 2018 11	América	1–1	Guadalajara	Mexico City
18:00	Ibargüen 80'; Rodríguez (yellow card) 90+5'	Report	Pulido 58'; Hernández (yellow card) 90+3'; Gudiño (yellow card) 90+4'	Stadium: Azteca; Referee: César Arturo Ramos Palazuelos

6 October 2018 12	Guadalajara	1–2	UNAM	Zapopan
21:06 CST	Brizuela 5'	Report	Rodríguez 15'; Mora 65'	Stadium: Estadio Akron; Attendance: 30,899; Referee: Oscar Macías

21 October 2018 13	BUAP	1–1	Guadalajara	Puebla
12:00	Ramos 12'; Olascoaga (yellow card) 48'; F.J.Rodríguez (yellow card) 77'	Report	Marín 52'	Stadium: Universitario BUAP; Referee: Jorge Antonio Pérez Durán

27 October 2018 14	Guadalajara	1–2	Morelia	Zapopan
19:00	Zaldívar 4', (yellow card) 72'; Beltrán (yellow card) 70'; Pereira (yellow card) 80'	Report	Rocha (yellow card) 35'; Beltrán 49' (o.g.); Vegas 67'	Stadium: Estadio Akron; Referee: Fernando Guerrero Ramírez

2 November 2018 15	Puebla	2–2	Guadalajara	Puebla City
21:00	Robles 49'; Arreola 59'	Report	Pulido 5'; Pereira 10'	Stadium: Estadio Cuauhtémoc; Attendance: 14,276; Referee: Diego Montaño

10 November 2018 16	León	0–1	Guadalajara	León
19:00	Rodríguez (yellow card) 36'; Aquino (yellow card) 49'; Navarro (yellow card) 66'	Report	Zaldívar 63'	Stadium: Estadio León; Referee: Roberto Rios Jácome

24 November 2018 17	Guadalajara	0–1	UANL	Zapopan
21:00		Report	Rodríguez 90+1'	Stadium: Akron; Attendance: 23,715; Referee: César Arturo Ramos

=== Apertura Copa MX ===
==== Group stage ====
Pos	Team	Pld	W	D	L	GF	GA	GD	Pts	Qualification
1	Guadalajara	4	3	1	0	6	3	+3	10	Advance to knockout stage
2	Morelia	4	1	1	2	6	6	0	4	
3	Oaxaca	4	0	2	2	1	4	−3	2	

Source: Copa MX
Rules for classification: Tiebreakers

31 July 2018 1	Guadalajara	3–2	Morelia	Zapopan
21:00	Sandoval 25', 42'; Macías 83'	Report	Ferreira 63'; Meraz 69'	Stadium: Akron; Attendance: 13,493; Referee: Diego Montaño

8 August 2018 2	Oaxaca	0–0	Guadalajara	Oaxaca City
21:00		Report		Stadium: Tecnológico de Oaxaca; Attendance: 8,129; Referee: Brian Omar González Vélez

14 August 2018 3	Guadalajara	1–0	Oaxaca	Zapopan
19:00	López 23'	Report		Stadium: Akron; Attendance: 9,326; Referee: Roberto Ríos Jácome

28 August 2018 4	Morelia	1–2	Guadalajara	Morelia
21:00	Vegas 31'	Report	Sepúlveda 44'; Godínez 72'	Stadium: Morelos; Attendance: 18,824; Referee: Jonathan Hernández

==== Round of 16 ====
26 September 2018	Guadalajara	1–3	UNAM	Zapopan
21:15	Pulido 10'	Report	Alustiza 2'; Figueroa 39'; Galindo 90+2' (o.g.)	Stadium: Akron; Attendance: 19,869; Referee: Jorge Isaac Rojas

=== FIFA Club World Cup ===
==== Quarter-finals ====
15 December 2018	Kashima Antlers (Japan)	3–2	(Mexico) Guadalajara	Al Ain, United Arab Emirates
19:00 UTC+4	Nagaki 49'; Serginho 69' (pen.); Abe 84'	Report	Zaldívar 3'; Pulido 90+4'	Stadium: Hazza bin Zayed Stadium; Attendance: 3,997; Referee: Bamlak Tessema Weyesa (Ethiopia)

==== Match for fifth place ====
18 December 2018	Espérance de Tunis (Tunisia)	1–1 (6–5 p)	(Mexico) Guadalajara	Al Ain
17:30 UTC+4	Belaïli 38' (pen.)	Report	Sandoval 5' (pen.)	Stadium: Hazza bin Zayed Stadium; Attendance: 5,883; Referee: Matthew Conger (New Zealand)
	Penalties
	Belaïli (penalty missed); Machani (penalty scored); Chemmam (penalty scored); Bguir (penalty missed); Khenissi (penalty scored); Derbali (penalty scored); Coulibaly (penalty scored); Dhaouadi (penalty scored)		(penalty scored) Zaldívar; (penalty missed) Marín; (penalty scored) Godínez; (penalty missed) Van Rankin; (penalty scored) Salcido; (penalty scored) Pineda; (penalty scored) Ponce; (penalty missed) Brizuela

=== Torneo Clausura ===
==== League table ====
Pos	Team	Pld	W	D	L	GF	GA	GD	Pts
12	BUAP	17	6	2	9	17	34	−17	20
13	Atlas	17	6	1	10	19	28	−9	19
14	Guadalajara	17	5	3	9	16	21	−5	18
15	Pumas UNAM	17	4	5	8	19	26	−7	17
16	Morelia	17	2	7	8	20	31	−11	13

Source: Liga MX
Rules for classification: 1) Points; 2) Goal difference; 3) Number of goals scored; 4) Head-to-head results between tied teams; 5) Number of goals scored away; 6) Highest relegation coefficient; 7) Fair Play points

==== Results summary ====
Overall								Home						Away					
Pld	W	D	L	GF	GA	GD	Pts	W	D	L	GF	GA	GD	W	D	L	GF	GA	GD
15	4	3	8	13	18	−5	15	3	1	4	7	8	−1	1	2	4	6	10	−4

Last updated: 20 April 2019.
Source: LigaMX

==== Result round by round ====
Round	1	2	3	4	5	6	7	8	9	10	11	12	13	14	15	16	17
Ground	H	A	H	A	H	A	H	A	H	A	H	A	H	A	H	H	A
Result	W	W	W	L	D	D	W										
Position	3	2	1														

Updated to match(es) played on 13 January 2019. Source: LigaMX
A = Away; H = Home; W = Win; D = Draw; L = Loss

==== Matches ====
5 January 2019 1	Guadalajara	2–0	Tijuana	Zapopan
21:00	Pulido 54'; Brizuela 90+3'	Report		Stadium: Estadio Akron; Attendance: 26,061; Referee: Adonai Escobedo

12 January 2019 2	Cruz Azul	0–1	Guadalajara	Mexico City
19:00		Report	R. Cisneros 79'	Stadium: Estadio Azteca; Attendance: 32,881; Referee: Jorge Isaac Rojas

20 January 2019 3	Guadalajara	1–0	Toluca	Zapopan
18:30	Pulido 57'	Report		Stadium: Estadio Akron; Attendance: 31,718; Referee: Jorge Pérez Durán

27 January 2019 4	Santos Laguna	1–0	Guadalajara	Torreón
18:00	Vazquez 19'	Report		Stadium: Estadio Corona; Attendance: 27,919; Referee: Luis Enrique Santander

4 February 2019 5	Guadalajara	0–0	Veracruz	Zapopan
18:36		Report		Stadium: Estadio Akron; Attendance: 27,914; Referee: Eduardo Galván

9 February 2019 6	Necaxa	3–3	Guadalajara	Aguascalientes
21:00	V. Alvarado 27' (o.g.); Pulido 81' (pen.); R. Cisneros 89'	Report	Brian Fernández 51', 61'; Guzmán 90+4'	Stadium: Estadio Victoria; Attendance: 24,296; Referee: César Ramos Palazuelos

16 February 2019 7	Guadalajara	3–0	Atlas	Zapopan
21:00	Vega 8', 23', 61'	Report		Stadium: Estadio Akron; Attendance: 34,648; Referee: Jorge Isaac Rojas

23 February 2019 8	Pachuca	3–1	Guadalajara	Pachuca
21:00	Sosa 14'; Murillo (yellow card) 39'; Guzmán 47'; J. Hernández (yellow card) 73'; Ulloa 79'; García (yellow card) 83'; Dávila (yellow card) 84'	Report	Brizuela 18'; Van Rankin (yellow card) 22'; Villalpando (yellow card) 43'	Stadium: Estadio Hidalgo; Referee: Fernando Hernandez Gomez

2 March 2019 9	Guadalajara	0–2	Monterrey	Zapopan
21:00	Pulido (yellow card) 32'; Mier (yellow card) 48'; Molina (yellow card) 70'	Report	Pabón 2', 89'; Gallardo (yellow card) 33'; Ortíz (yellow card) 64'; Vangioni (yellow card) 78'; Pizarro (yellow card) 79'	Stadium: Estadio Akron; Attendance: 32,233; Referee: Adonai Escobedo Gonzalez

9 March 2019 10	Querétaro	0–0	Guadalajara	Querétaro
21:00	Villalva (yellow card) 88'	Report		Stadium: Estadio Corregidora; Referee: Diego Montaño Robles

16 March 2019 11	Guadalajara	0–2	América	Zapopan
19:00	Vega (yellow card) 11'; Molina (red card) 36'; Ponce (yellow card) 75'	Report	Castillo 2'; P. Aguilar (yellow card) 27'; Aguilera (yellow card) 29'; Ibargüen 49'	Stadium: Estadio Akron; Referee: Jorge Isaac Rojas Castillo

31 March 2019 12	UNAM	2–1	Guadalajara	Mexico City
12:00	González 26'; Quintana 41'	Report	Sandoval 30'; Pereira (yellow card) 46'; Basulto (yellow card) 51'	Stadium: Olímpico Universitario; Referee: Fernando Guerrero Ramírez

6 April 2019 13	Guadalajara	0–1	BUAP	Zapopan
21:00	Vega (red card) 44'; Mayorga (yellow card) 51'; Villanueva (yellow card) 72'; Marín (yellow card) 86'	Report	F. J. Rodríguez (yellow card) 53'; Chirinos 80'	Stadium: Estadio Akron; Referee: Oscar Macías Romo

13 April 2019 14	Morelia	1–0	Guadalajara	Morelia
21:03	Flores 14'; Millar (yellow card) 23'; Velarde (yellow card) 54'; Vegas (yellow card) 59'; Malagón (yellow card) 73'	Report	Marín (yellow card) 42'; Villalpando (yellow card) 65'; Mier (yellow card) 71'; Brizuela (red card) 79'	Stadium: Morelos; Referee: César Arturo Ramos Palazuelos

20 April 2019 15	Guadalajara	1–3	Puebla	Zapopan
21:00	Angulo 19' (o.g.) van Rankin (yellow card) 54'	Report	Angulo 33', 38'; Alustiza 49'; Zavala (yellow card) 54'	Stadium: Estadio Akron; Referee: Adonai Escobedo Gonzalez

=== Clausura Copa MX ===
==== Group stage ====
Pos	Team	Pld	W	D	L	GF	GA	GD	Pts	Qualification
1	Guadalajara	3	2	1	0	6	2	+4	7	Advance to knockout stage
2	Sonora	4	1	2	1	3	4	−1	5	Possible knockout stage
3	Tapachula	3	1	0	2	1	4	−3	3	

Updated to match(es) played on 15 January 2019. Source: Copa MX
Rules for classification: Tiebreakers

8 January 2019 1	Sonora	1–2	Guadalajara	Hermosillo
20:00	Vallejo 52'	Report	Marín 13'; Godínez 24'	Stadium: Estadio Héroe de Nacozari; Attendance: 18,322; Referee: Juan Andrés Esquivel

15 January 2019 2	Guadalajara	3–0	Tapachula	Zapopan
21:00	R. Cisneros 19'; Ibars 24' (o.g.); Basulto 52'	Report		Stadium: Estadio Akron; Attendance: 7,191; Referee: Roberto Ríos

29 January 2019 5	Guadalajara	1–1	Sonora	Zapopan
19:00	R. Cisneros 66'	Report	Vázquez 60'	Stadium: Estadio Akron; Attendance: 6,832; Referee: Francisco Chacón

== Statistics ==
=== Goals ===
As of 25 February 2019

Rank	Player	Position	Apertura	Apertura Copa MX	FIFA CWC	Clausura	Clausura Copa MX	Total
1	(Mexico) Ángel Zaldívar	FW	6	0	1	0	0	7
1	(Mexico) Alan Pulido	FW	3	1	0	3	0	7
3	(Mexico) Gael Sandoval	MF	1	2	1	0	0	4
3	(Mexico) Isaác Brizuela	MF	2	0	0	2	0	4
5	(Mexico) Javier López	MF	2	1	0	0	0	3
5	(Mexico) Alexis Vega	FW	0	0	0	3	0	3
5	(Mexico) Ronaldo Cisneros	FW	0	0	0	2	1	3
5	(Mexico) Hedgardo Marín	DF	2	0	0	0	1	3
9	(Mexico) Josecarlos Van Rankin	DF	2	0	0	0	0	2
9	(Mexico) José Macías	FW	0	1	0	0	1	2
12	(Mexico) Alan Cervantes	MF	1	0	0	0	0	1
12	(Mexico) Jesús Godínez	FW	0	1	0	0	0	1
12	(Mexico) Jair Pereira	DF	1	0	0	0	0	1
12	(Mexico) Orbelín Pineda	MF	1	0	0	0	0	1
12	(Mexico) Ángel Sepúlveda	MF	0	1	0	0	0	1
12	(Mexico) Miguel Basulto	DF	0	0	0	0	1	1
Own goals			0	0	1	1	1	3
Total			21	7	3	11	5	47

=== Clean sheets ===
As of 12 January 2019

Rank	Name	Apertura	Ap. Copa MX	FIFA CWC	Clausura	Clausura Copa MX	Total
1	(Mexico) Miguel Jiménez	2	2	0	0	0	4
1	(Mexico) Raúl Gudiño	2	0	0	2	0	4
Total		4	2	0	2	0	8
