= Josecarlos Van Rankin =

Mexican footballer (born 1993)

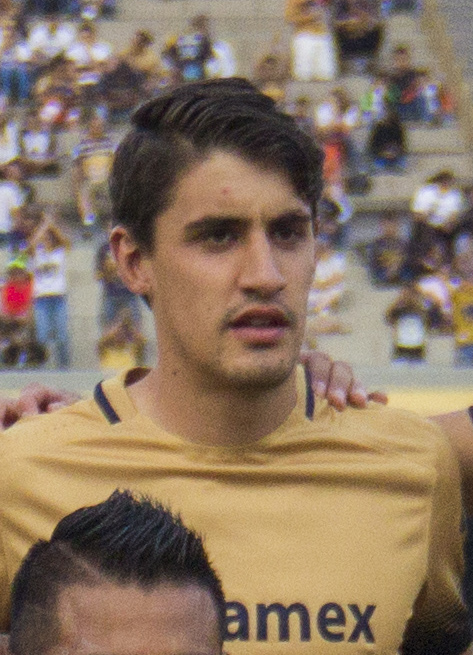
- Van Rankin with UNAM in 2016

Personal information
- Full name: Josecarlos Van Rankin Galland
- Date of birth: 14 May 1993 (age 33)
- Place of birth: Mexico City, Mexico
- Height: 1.73 m (5 ft 8 in)
- Position: Right-back

Team information
- Current team: Atlético Morelia
- Number: 5

Youth career
- 2010–2012: UNAM

Senior career*
Years	Team	Apps	(Gls)
2012–2019	UNAM	150	(5)
2018–2019	→ Guadalajara (loan)	33	(2)
2019–2022	Guadalajara	8	(0)
2020	→ Santos Laguna (loan)	24	(2)
2021–2022	→ Portland Timbers (loan)	61	(1)
2023	→ Necaxa (loan)	17	(0)
2023–2024	Etar Veliko Tarnovo	11	(0)
2026–	Atlético Morelia	15	(3)

International career
2012–2013	Mexico U20	5	(0)
2013–2015	Mexico U21	3	(0)
2015	Mexico U23	8	(0)
2018	Mexico	1	(0)
Medal record
Representing Mexico
Men's football
Pan American Games
Silver medal – second place	2015 Toronto	Team
Olympic Qualifying Championship
Winner	2015 United States
CONCACAF U-20 Championship
Winner	2013 Mexico	Team
- * Club domestic league appearances and goals as of 21:58, 21 September 2026 (UTC)

Josecarlos Van Rankin Galland (born 14 May 1993) is a Mexican professional footballer who plays as a right-back for Liga de Expansión MX side Atlético Morelia.

== Club career ==
=== Youth ===
Van Rankin joined the youth academy of UNAM in 2010. After continuing through Pumas UNAM Youth Academy successfully going through UNAM Premier, Pumas Morelos, U-17, and U-20. He finally reached the first team, Juan Antonio Torres being the coach promoting Van Rankin to first team.

=== UNAM ===
Van Rankin made his Liga MX debut for Pumas UNAM as a second-half substitute for Érik Vera in a 2–1 loss against Club América on 19 March 2012.

==== Guadalajara (loan) ====
He would join Guadalajara on loan. He would make his debut with the team on 21 July 2018, managing to score his team's only goal at the 59th minute in a 2–1 loss against Tijuana. On 30 September 2018, he would contribute an assist to Alan Pulido to score the first goal in the Súper Clásico against América at the 59th minute, eventually concluding with a score of 1–1.

=== Guadalajara ===
On 3 May 2019, Guadalajara made Van Rankin's transfer permanent.

==== Santos Laguna (loan) ====
On 15 December 2019, Van Rankin joined Santos Laguna on loan for the Apertura 2020.

==== Portland Timbers (loan) ====
On 3 February 2021, Van Rankin joined Major League Soccer side Portland Timbers on loan for the 2021 season. Following the 2022 season, his purchase option was declined by Portland.

=== Necaxa ===
On 9 December 2022, Van Rankin joined Necaxa, for the Clausura 2023.

=== SFC Etar Veliko Tarnovo ===
On 30 August 2023, after being released by Necaxa, he joined Bulgarian side Etar Veliko Tarnovo.

== International career ==
=== Youth ===
Van Rankin participated with the under-20 team that won the 2013 CONCACAF U-20 Championship, starting in all 5 games where Mexico was the eventual winner. He was on listed on the Best Eleven of the tournament. Eventually, he was selected to the squad that went to the 2013 FIFA U-20 World in Turkey.

=== Senior ===
Van Rankin was called up for the first time to the senior national team by interim coach Ricardo Ferretti for October friendlies against Costa Rica and Chile. He would make his national team debut on 11 October 2018 in a 3–2 win against Costa Rica, responsible for an assist to Víctor Guzmán for the first Mexico goal and contributing a handball for an opposing penalty.

== Personal life ==
Van Rankin's sister is actress Mariana Van Rankin and his uncle is actor and television host Jorge van Rankin. Van Rankin also holds a passport for the Netherlands.

== Career statistics ==
=== Club ===
As of 2 February 2024

Appearances and goals by club, season and competition
Club	Season	League			Cup		Continental		Other		Total	
Club	Season	Division	Apps	Goals	Apps	Goals	Apps	Goals	Apps	Goals	Apps	Goals
Pumas UNAM	2011–12	Liga MX	1	0	—		0	0	—		1	0
Pumas UNAM	2012–13	Liga MX	9	0	1	0	—		—		10	0
Pumas UNAM	2013–14	Liga MX	26	2	8	1	—		—		34	3
Pumas UNAM	2014–15	Liga MX	34	1	4	0	—		—		38	1
Pumas UNAM	2015–16	Liga MX	21	0	1	0	4 (Note: Appearances Copa Libertadores)	0	—		26	0
Pumas UNAM	2016–17	Liga MX	26	1	0	0	5 (Note: Appearances in CONCACAF Champions League)	1	—		31	2
Pumas UNAM	2017–18	Liga MX	33	1	7	0	—		—		40	1
Pumas UNAM	Total		150	5	21	0	9	1	0	0	180	6
Pumas Morelos	2012–13	Ascenso MX	10	0	4	0	—		—		14	0
Guadalajara (loan)	2018–19	Liga MX	33	2	0	0	—		2 (Note: Appearances in FIFA Club World Cup)	0	35	2
Guadalajara	2019–20	Liga MX	8	0	1	0	—		—		9	0
Santos Laguna (loan)	2019–20	Liga MX	10	0	1	0	—		—		11	0
Santos Laguna (loan)	2020–21	Liga MX	14	2	—		—		—		14	2
Santos Laguna (loan)	Total		24	2	1	0	0	0	0	0	25	2
Portland Timbers (loan)	2021	Major League Soccer	37	0	0	0	4	0	—		41	0
Portland Timbers (loan)	2022	Major League Soccer	24	1	0	0	—		—		24	1
Portland Timbers (loan)	Total		61	1	0	0	4	0	0	0	65	1
Necaxa	2022–23	Liga MX	24	1	—		—		—		24	1
Etar	2023–24	Bulgarian First League	0	0	0	0	—		—		0	0
Career total			303	10	27	1	13	1	2	0	345	12

=== International ===
As of match played 12 October 2018

National team	Year	Apps	Goals
Mexico	2018	1	0
Total		1	0

== Honours ==
Mexico Youth

- CONCACAF U-20 Championship: 2013
- Pan American Silver Medal: 2015
- CONCACAF Olympic Qualifying Championship: 2015

Individual

- CONCACAF U-20 Championship Best XI: 2013
