= Orbelín Pineda =

Mexican footballer (born 1996)

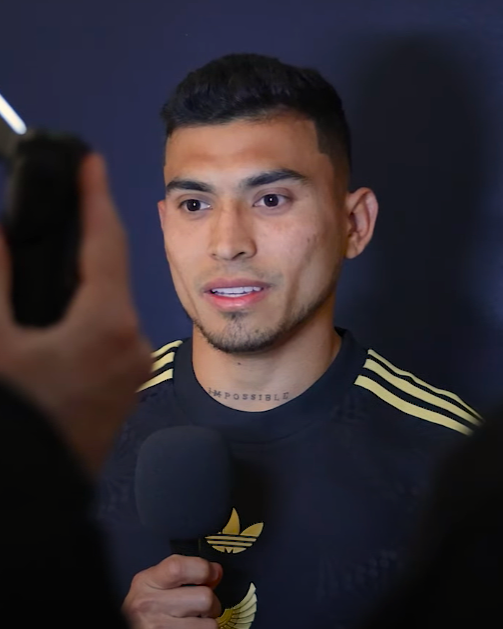
- Pineda with Mexico in 2025

Personal information
- Full name: Orbelín Pineda Alvarado
- Date of birth: 24 March 1996 (age 30)
- Place of birth: Coyuca de Catalán, Guerrero, Mexico
- Height: 1.73 m (5 ft 8 in)
- Position: Midfielder

Team information
- Current team: Monterrey
- Number: 13

Youth career
- 2012–2014: Querétaro

Senior career*
Years	Team	Apps	(Gls)
2014–2015	Querétaro	44	(8)
2016–2018	Guadalajara	102	(7)
2019–2022	Cruz Azul	97	(10)
2022–2023	Celta	7	(0)
2022–2023	→ AEK Athens (loan)	36	(9)
2023–2026	AEK Athens	94	(9)
2026–	Monterrey	14	(1)

International career^{‡}
2015	Mexico U20	3	(0)
2016–	Mexico	96	(12)
Medal record
Men's football
Representing Mexico
CONCACAF Gold Cup
Winner	2019 United States
Winner	2023 United States–Canada
Winner	2025 United States–Canada
Runner-up	2021 United States
CONCACAF Nations League
Winner	2025 United States
Runner-up	2021 United States
Runner-up	2024 United States
Third place	2023 United States
- * Club domestic league appearances and goals as of 21 November 2026 ‡ National team caps and goals as of 29 September 2026

Orbelín Pineda Alvarado (born 24 March 1996) is a Mexican professional footballer who plays as a midfielder for Liga MX club Monterrey and the Mexico national team.

== Club career ==
=== Querétaro ===
Pineda was first called up to the Querétaro senior team on 21 January 2014, for a Copa MX match against Ascenso MX side Celaya and made his debut as a second-half substitute in a 1–0 loss. Pineda made his Liga MX debut on 1 August 2014, in a 2–0 victory against Pachuca.

On 24 January 2015, he scored his first goal in a league match against Pachuca in a 1–2 loss. He was considered a pivotal part of the team as Querétaro reached the Clausura championship finals, only to succumb to Santos Laguna following an aggregate score of 5–3.

=== Guadalajara ===
On 2 December 2015, Guadalajara announced they had signed Pineda for an undisclosed price on a five-year contract. Pineda made his official debut as a starter on 10 January 2016, against Veracruz. He scored his first goal for the club on 16 January 2016, against Cruz Azul in a 1–1 tie.

On 10 July, he would score the first goal in the 2016 Supercopa MX against Veracruz which finished 2–0.

In April 2017, Guadalajara won the Clausura Copa MX final against Morelia. The following month, they disputed Clausura championship against Tigres UANL, as Guadalajara would go on to win the title, finishing an eleven-year-long drought of league titles. As a result, Guadalajara won their first Double since the 1969–70 season.

In April 2018, Guadalajara went on to win the CONCACAF Champions League Finals against Major League Soccer team Toronto FC following a penalty shoot-out victory of 4–2.

=== Cruz Azul ===
In December 2018, it was announced Cruz Azul signed Pineda for $12 million. He made his debut with the team on 4 January 2019, in 1–1 draw against Puebla.

In July 2019, he would win the Supercopa MX after defeating Necaxa 4–0. In September, he would also go on to win the inaugural Leagues Cup after defeating Tigres UANL 2–1.

Pineda played an integral part in Cruz Azul's championship-winning Guardianes 2021 campaign.

=== Celta de Vigo ===
On 7 January 2022, Pineda signed a five-year contract with Spanish club Celta de Vigo. Pineda made his debut with the club on 21 February against Levante UD, coming on as a substitute on the second half in an eventual 1–1 draw.

=== AEK Athens ===
On 15 July, Pineda joined Greek club, AEK Athens on a season-long loan, rejoining former Guadalajara manager, Matías Almeyda. Pineda made his debut on 20 August in a league match against Lamia, as a starter, he scored a goal and contributed an assist in a 3–0 victory.

His performances for the season led him to be named the league's player of the season, best foreigner and in the team of the season, as well as the club's best player.

On 1 July 2023, AEK Athens permanently signed Pineda from Celta de Vigo for a fee of €6.5 million, while the player penned a four-year deal until 2027. The club officially announced, on social media, the transfer as 'the biggest in the club's history'.

On 18 June 2026, Pineda was named the Super League Player of the Season for the second time in his career, following AEK's league title win.

=== Monterrey ===
On 18 July 2026, Pineda returned to Mexico to join Monterrey, rejoining manager Matias Almeyda.

On 26 July, Pineda made his debut with the team, coming on as a substitute in a 2–1 loss against Necaxa. On 15 August, Pineda scored his first goal with the team in a 6–1 thrashing against Juárez, the fourth for his side.

== International career ==
=== Youth ===
Pineda was called up to the under-20 side by manager Sergio Almaguer to take part in the 2015 FIFA U-20 World Cup in New Zealand. He made his debut in Mexico's opening match as a half-time substitution for José David Ramírez. Mexico went on to lose the game 2–0 to Mali. Pineda started the next two matches for Mexico, but the team finished in 4th place in their group and failed to qualify to the next round.

=== Senior ===
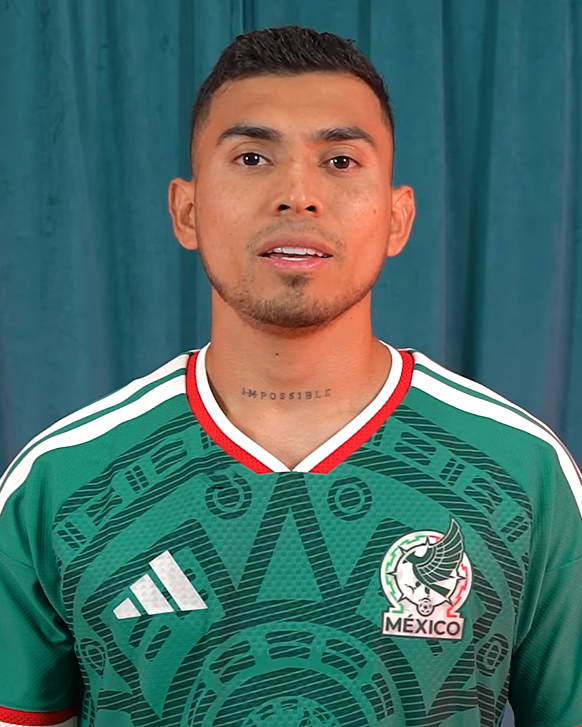
Pineda with Mexico in 2025

Pineda was included in the provisional roster for the 2015 CONCACAF Gold Cup by Miguel Herrera but was cut from the final list, remaining in the Provisional List if someone else got injured. He was called up again, this time by Juan Carlos Osorio, to be included in Mexico's provisional squad for the Copa América Centenario but was cut from the final squad. Pineda would make his senior national team debut on 6 September 2016 against Honduras during a 2018 FIFA World Cup qualification match, coming in as a substitute for Jesús Dueñas at the 71st minute, finishing in a scoreless draw.

He was included in the finalized roster that would participate at the 2017 CONCACAF Gold Cup, where on 9 July he would score his first goal with the senior national team during a group stage match against El Salvador, scoring the final goal of a 3–1 win.

In June 2019, Pineda was included in Gerardo Martino's 2019 CONCACAF Gold Cup roster. Mexico went on to win the tournament.

Pineda participated at the 2021 Gold Cup, scoring a total of 3 times and contributing one assist. Mexico finished runner-up after losing the final to the United States 0–1.

In October 2022, Pineda was named in Mexico's preliminary 31-man squad for the 2022 FIFA World Cup, and in November, he was ultimately included in the final 26-man roster.

Pineda participated in the 2023 Gold Cup, where he was a key player for the national team, scoring twice in matches leading up to the final. In the final, he would assist Santiago Giménez's winning goal against Panama to secure his second trophy with Mexico.

Pineda was named in the 26-man squad for the 2026 FIFA World Cup, hosted on home soil.

== Style of play ==
Pineda is able to play as a deep-lying, roaming or more advanced playmaker, he has regularly played as the more advanced of the two in a 4-2-3-1 formation. Described by fans as an excellent reader of the game, Pineda tries to spot incisive through balls in order to be able to find space on the pitch by moving into the channels between defenders. Former Guadalajara manager Matías Almeyda described Pineda as "one of those players that has to end up in a great European club. He has the talent and the attributes." Fans also praise his perceived technical skill.

== Personal life ==
Pineda's older brother, Onay, was also a professional footballer who played as a right-back.

== Career statistics ==
=== Club ===
As of match played on 21 November 2026

Appearances and goals by club, season and competition
Club	Season	League			National cup (Note: Includes Copa MX, Greek Cup)		Continental		Global		Other		Total	
Club	Season	Division	Apps	Goals	Apps	Goals	Apps	Goals	Apps	Goals	Apps	Goals	Apps	Goals
Querétaro	2013–14	Liga MX	—		1	0	—		—		—		1	0
Querétaro	2014–15	Liga MX	29	5	12	1	—		—		—		41	6
Querétaro	2015–16	Liga MX	15	3	—		2 (Note: Appearances in CONCACAF Champions League)	0	—		—		17	3
Querétaro	Total		44	8	13	1	2	0	—		—		59	9
Guadalajara	2015–16	Liga MX	19	4	2 (Note: One appearance and one goal in Supercopa MX in 2015, another appearance in 2018)	1	—		—		—		21	5
Guadalajara	2016–17	Liga MX	42	2	9	0	—		—		—		51	2
Guadalajara	2017–18	Liga MX	29	0	4	1	8	1	—		—		41	2
Guadalajara	2018–19	Liga MX	12	1	1	0	—		2 (Note: Appearances in FIFA Club World Cup)	0	—		15	1
Guadalajara	Total		102	7	16	2	8	1	2	0	—		128	10
Cruz Azul	2018–19	Liga MX	18	2	5	0	—		—		3 (Note: Appearances in Leagues Cup)	1	26	3
Cruz Azul	2019–20	Liga MX	25	3	—		3	1	—		—		28	4
Cruz Azul	2020–21	Liga MX	41	4	5 (Note: Appearances in Copa Sky por México)	1	3	1	—		—		49	6
Cruz Azul	2021–22	Liga MX	13	1	—		—		—		1 (Note: Appearance in Campeones Cup)	0	14	1
Cruz Azul	Total		97	10	10	1	6	2	—		4	1	117	14
Celta Vigo	2021–22	La Liga	7	0	—		—		—		—		7	0
AEK Athens (loan)	2022–23	Super League Greece	36	9	6	1	—		—		—		42	10
AEK Athens	2023–24	Super League Greece	33	3	2	0	9 (Note: Four appearances in UEFA Champions League, five appearances and one goal in UEFA Europa League)	1	—		—		44	4
AEK Athens	2024–25	Super League Greece	30	1	6	0	2 (Note: Appearances in UEFA Conference League)	0	—		—		38	1
AEK Athens	2025–26	Super League Greece	31	5	3	0	16	0	—		—		50	5
AEK Athens	AEK total		94	9	11	0	27	1	—		—		132	10
Monterrey	2026–27	Liga MX	14	1	—		—		—		5	2	19	3
Career total			394	44	56	5	43	4	2	0	9	3	504	56

=== International ===
As of match played on 29 September 2026

Appearances and goals by national team and year
National team	Year	Apps	Goals
Mexico	2016	3	0
Mexico	2017	11	1
Mexico	2018	1	0
Mexico	2019	6	0
Mexico	2020	4	1
Mexico	2021	18	4
Mexico	2022	8	0
Mexico	2023	15	3
Mexico	2024	12	2
Mexico	2025	11	1
Mexico	2026	7	0
Total		96	12

Scores and results list Mexico's goal tally first, score column indicates score after each Pineda goal.

List of international goals scored by Orbelín Pineda
No.	Date	Venue	Opponent	Score	Result	Competition
1	9 July 2017	Qualcomm Stadium, San Diego, United States	El Salvador	3–1	3–1	2017 CONCACAF Gold Cup
2	30 September 2020	Estadio Azteca, Mexico City, Mexico	Guatemala	2–0	3–0	Friendly
3	14 July 2021	Cotton Bowl, Dallas, United States	Guatemala	3–0	3–0	2021 CONCACAF Gold Cup
4	24 July 2021	State Farm Stadium, Glendale, United States	Honduras	3–0	3–0	2021 CONCACAF Gold Cup
5	29 July 2021	NRG Stadium, Houston, United States	Canada	1–0	2–1	2021 CONCACAF Gold Cup
6	5 September 2021	Estadio Nacional, San José, Costa Rica	Costa Rica	1–0	1–0	2022 FIFA World Cup qualification
7	26 March 2023	Estadio Azteca, Mexico City, Mexico	Jamaica	1–1	2–2	2022–23 CONCACAF Nations League A
8	25 June 2023	NRG Stadium, Houston, United States	Honduras	3–0	4–0	2023 CONCACAF Gold Cup
9	8 July 2023	AT&T Stadium, Arlington, United States	Costa Rica	1–0	2–0	2023 CONCACAF Gold Cup
10	21 March 2024	AT&T Stadium, Arlington, United States	Panama	3–0	3–0	2024 CONCACAF Nations League Finals
11	7 September 2024	Rose Bowl, Pasadena, United States	New Zealand	1–0	3–0	Friendly
12	10 June 2025	Kenan Stadium, Chapel Hill, United States	Turkey	1–0	1–0	Friendly

== Honours ==
Guadalajara

- Liga MX: Clausura 2017
- Copa MX: Clausura 2017
- Supercopa MX: 2016
- CONCACAF Champions League: 2018

Cruz Azul

- Liga MX: Guardianes 2021
- Supercopa MX: 2019
- Leagues Cup: 2019

AEK Athens

- Super League Greece: 2022–23, 2025–26
- Greek Cup: 2022–23

Mexico

- CONCACAF Gold Cup: 2019, 2023, 2025
- CONCACAF Nations League: 2024–25

Individual

- Liga MX All-Star: 2021
- Super League Greece Player of the Season: 2022–23, 2025–26
- Super League Greece Best Foreign Player: 2022–23, 2025–26
- Super League Greece Team of the Season: 2022–23, 2023–24, 2025–26
- Super League Greece Goal of the Season: 2025–26
- AEK Athens Player of the Season: 2022–23, 2025–26
- CONCACAF Gold Cup Best XI: 2023
- IFFHS CONCACAF Best XI: 2023
