= Hedgardo Marín =

Mexican footballer (born 1993)

Personal information
- Full name: Hedgardo Marín Arroyo
- Date of birth: 21 February 1993 (age 33)
- Place of birth: Guadalajara, Jalisco, Mexico
- Height: 1.83 m (6 ft 0 in)
- Position: Centre-back

Youth career
- 2009–2014: Guadalajara

Senior career*
Years	Team	Apps	(Gls)
2014–2021	Guadalajara	61	(3)
2019–2020	→ Zacatecas (loan)	21	(0)
2020–2021	→ Juárez (loan)	13	(0)
2022	Oaxaca	30	(1)
2023–2025	Cancún	50	(3)

International career
2013	Mexico U20	4	(0)
2016–2017	Mexico	6	(1)
Medal record
Representing Mexico
Men's football
Pan American Games
Silver medal – second place	2015 Toronto	Team
Olympic Qualifying Championship
Winner	2015 United States
CONCACAF U-20 Championship
Winner	2013 Mexico	Team
- * Club domestic league appearances and goals as of 17:44, 10 September 2024 (UTC)

Hedgardo Marín Arroyo (born 21 February 1993) is a Mexican professional footballer who plays as a centre-back.

== Club career ==
=== Guadalajara ===
Marin joined Guadalajara's youth academy in 2008. He continued through Chivas Youth Academy successfully playing through Chivas ranks from U-17 and U-20. Until finally reaching the first team, Ricardo La Volpe being the coach promoting Marin to first team in 2013.

He made his official debut under Argentine coach Ricardo La Volpe as a starter in a game against Monterrey on 27 April 2014 which he played all 90 minutes.

==== Zacatecas ====
On 21 July 2019, Marín joined Ascenso MX club Mineros de Zacatecas on a one-year loan.

==== FC Juárez ====
On 10 July 2020 it was announced that Marin would join FC Juárez on loan for one year. On 24 October 2020, he made his first appearance against Tigres, replacing Bruno Romo in defense.

=== Alebrijes de Oaxaca ===
On 29 January 2022, Marín joined Alebrijes de Oaxaca.

=== Cancún FC ===
On 28 December 2022, Marín joined second division side Cancún FC.

== International career ==
=== Youth ===
Marín captained the squad that participated in the 2013 FIFA U-20 World Cup in Turkey.

=== Senior ===
Marín got his first call up to the senior Mexico side for matches against New Zealand and Panama in October 2016.

== Career statistics ==
=== Club ===
As of 26 January 2024

Appearances and goals by club, season and competition
Club	Season	League			Cup		Other		Total	
Club	Season	Division	Apps	Goals	Apps	Goals	Apps	Goals	Apps	Goals
Guadalajara	2013–14	Liga MX	1	0	5	0	—		6	0
Guadalajara	2014–15	Liga MX	7	0	14	0	—		21	0
Guadalajara	2015–16	Liga MX	10	0	9	0	—		19	0
Guadalajara	2016–17	Liga MX	12	1	9	0	—		21	1
Guadalajara	2017–18	Liga MX	12	0	4	2	—		16	2
Guadalajara	2018–19	Liga MX	19	2	6	1	2 (Note: Appearances in FIFA Club World Cup)	0	27	3
Guadalajara	Total		61	3	47	3	2	0	110	6
Zacatecas (loan)	2019–20	Ascenso MX	21	0	0	0	—		21	0
Juárez (loan)	2020–21	Liga MX	13	0	0	0	—		13	0
Oaxaca	2021–22	Liga de Expansión MX	14	0	0	0	—		14	0
Oaxaca	2022–23	Liga de Expansión MX	16	1	0	0	—		16	1
Oaxaca	Total		30	1	0	0	0	0	30	1
Cancún	2022–23	Liga de Expansión MX	15	1	0	0	—		15	1
Cancún	2023–24	Liga de Expansión MX	18	1	0	0	—		18	1
Cancún	Total		33	2	0	0	0	0	33	2
Career total			158	6	47	3	2	0	207	9

=== International ===
As of match played 14 July 2017

National team	Year	Apps	Goals
Mexico	2016	2	0
Mexico	2017	4	1
Total		6	1

=== International goals ===
Scores and results list Mexico's goal tally first.

Goal	Date	Venue	Opponent	Score	Result	Competition
1.	9 July 2017	Qualcomm Stadium, San Diego, United States	El Salvador	1–0	3–1	2017 CONCACAF Gold Cup

== Honours ==
Guadalajara

- Liga MX: Clausura 2017
- Copa MX: Apertura 2015, Clausura 2017
- Supercopa MX: 2016
- CONCACAF Champions League: 2018

Mexico Youth

- CONCACAF U-20 Championship: 2013
- Central American and Caribbean Games: 2014
- Pan American Silver Medal: 2015
- CONCACAF Olympic Qualifying Championship: 2015
