= Fernando Beltrán =

Mexican footballer (born 1998)

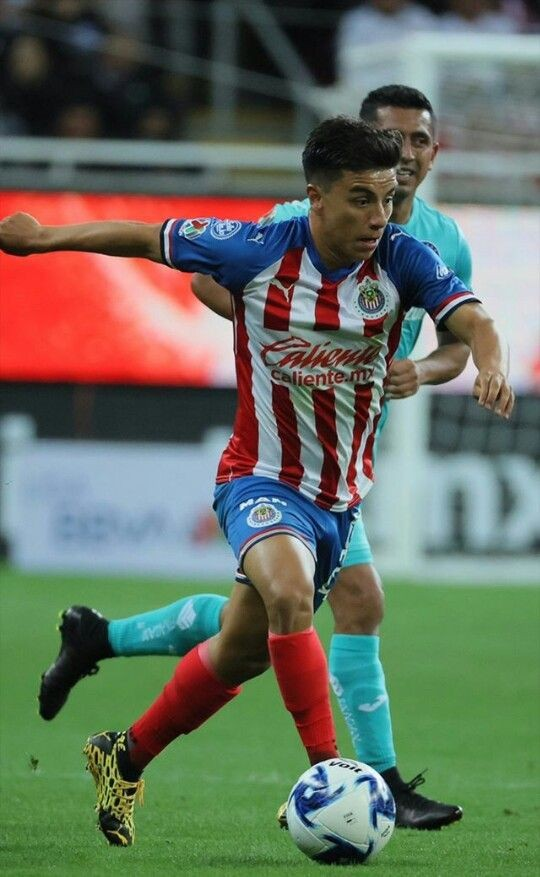
- Beltrán with Guadalajara in 2020

Personal information
- Full name: Fernando Beltrán Cruz
- Date of birth: 8 May 1998 (age 28)
- Place of birth: Mexico City, Mexico
- Height: 1.67 m (5 ft 6 in)
- Position: Midfielder

Team information
- Current team: León
- Number: 6

Youth career
- 2012–2013: Atlante
- 2014–2017: Guadalajara

Senior career*
Years	Team	Apps	(Gls)
2017–2025	Guadalajara	218	(13)
2021	→ Tapatío	1	(0)
2025–	León	48	(3)

International career^{‡}
2019–2021	Mexico U23	11	(0)
2020–	Mexico	11	(0)
Medal record
Men's football
Representing Mexico
Olympic Games
Bronze medal – third place	2020 Tokyo	Team
Toulon Tournament
Third place	2019 France	Team
- * Club domestic league appearances and goals as of 21 November 2026 ‡ National team caps and goals as of 2 June 2024

Fernando Beltrán Cruz (born 8 May 1998) is a Mexican professional footballer who plays as a midfielder for Liga MX club León.

== Club career ==
Beltrán first joined Atlante's youth academy in 2012, taking part in U-15 and third division squad and then briefly joined Santos Laguna's Escuela de Alto Rendimiento in 2014. He was scouted and joined Guadalajara's youth academy in 2014, managing to go through U-17 and U-20 youth system.

Beltrán debuted with the first-team under Matías Almeyda against Tigres UANL in the 2017 Campeón de Campeones on 16 July 2017, which ended in a 1–0 loss. Six days later, he made his league debut against Toluca in a 0–0 draw. On 25 January 2020, he would score his first league goal for Guadalajara against Toluca in a 2–2 draw.

In October 2020, Beltrán extended his contract with Guadalajara, committing to remain with the club through 2024.

On 3 June 2025, León reached an agreement to sign Beltrán from Chivas for a $3 million fee.

== International career ==
=== Youth ===
In May 2019, Beltrán was called up by Jaime Lozano to participate with the under-22 squad in that year's Toulon Tournament, where Mexico would place third in the competition.

Beltrán was called up to participate in the 2020 Summer Olympics. He won the bronze medal with the Olympic team.

=== Senior ===
In September 2020, Beltrán received his first senior national team call up by Gerardo Martino for a training camp. At the end of the month, he made his debut with the national team in a friendly match against Guatemala, coming on as a substitute during the second half for a 3–0 victory.

== Career statistics ==
=== Club ===
As of match played on 21 November 2026

Club	Season	League			Cup		Continental		Other		Total	
Club	Season	Division	Apps	Goals	Apps	Goals	Apps	Goals	Apps	Goals	Apps	Goals
Guadalajara	2016–17	Liga MX	—		1 (Note: Appearance in Campeón de Campeones)	0	—		—		1	0
Guadalajara	2017–18	Liga MX	8	0	4	1	—		—		12	1
Guadalajara	2018–19	Liga MX	19	0	7	0	—		—		26	0
Guadalajara	2019–20	Liga MX	18	2	4	0	—		—		22	2
Guadalajara	2020–21	Liga MX	34	0	5 (Note: Appearances in Copa GNP por México)	0	—		—		39	0
Guadalajara	2021–22	Liga MX	30	2	—		—		—		30	2
Guadalajara	2022–23	Liga MX	38	3	5 (Note: Appearances in Copa Sky por México)	0	—		—		43	3
Guadalajara	2023–24	Liga MX	40	5	—		3 (Note: Appearances in CONCACAF Champions Cup)	0	2 (Note: Appearances in Leagues Cup)	0	45	5
Guadalajara	2024–25	Liga MX	31	1	—		4	1	2	0	37	2
Guadalajara	Total		218	13	26	1	7	1	4	0	255	15
Tapatío (loan)	2020–21	Liga de Expansión MX	1	0	—		—		—		1	0
León	2025–26	Liga MX	31	3	—		—		2	0	33	3
León	2026–27	Liga MX	17	0	—		—		6	0	23	0
León	Total		48	3	—		—		8	0	56	3
Career total			267	16	26	1	7	1	12	0	312	18

=== International ===
As of match played on 2 June 2024

National team	Year	Apps	Goals
Mexico	2020	1	0
Mexico	2021	3	0
Mexico	2022	5	0
Mexico	2023	1	0
Mexico	2024	1	0
Total		11	0

== Honours ==
Guadalajara

- CONCACAF Champions League: 2018

Mexico U23

- Olympic Bronze Medal: 2020

Mexico

- CONCACAF Nations League third place: 2022–23

Individual

- Liga MX All-Star: 2022
