= Carlos Villanueva (Mexican footballer) =

Mexican footballer (born 1994)

Personal information
- Full name: Carlos Octavio Villanueva López
- Date of birth: 7 April 1994 (age 32)
- Place of birth: Uruapan, Michoacán, Mexico
- Height: 1.85 m (6 ft 1 in)
- Position: Defender

Team information
- Current team: Querétaro
- Number: 15

Senior career*
Years	Team	Apps	(Gls)
2012–2021	Guadalajara	13	(0)
2017	→ Coras (loan)	17	(1)
2017–2018	→ Zacatepec (loan)	18	(0)
2018–2019	→ Necaxa (loan)	1	(0)
2020	→ Sinaloa (loan)	17	(0)
2021	→ Tapatío (loan)	7	(0)
2021–2023	Tepatitlán	83	(3)
2024–2025	Atlante	54	(2)
2025–	Querétaro	25	(0)
- * Club domestic league appearances and goals as of 14 November 2026

Carlos Octavio Villanueva López (born 7 April 1994) is a Mexican professional footballer who plays as a defender for Liga MX club Querétaro.

== Honours ==
Guadalajara

- Copa MX: Apertura 2015
- Supercopa MX: 2016

Necaxa

- Supercopa MX: 2018
