= Gael Sandoval =

Mexican footballer (born 1995)

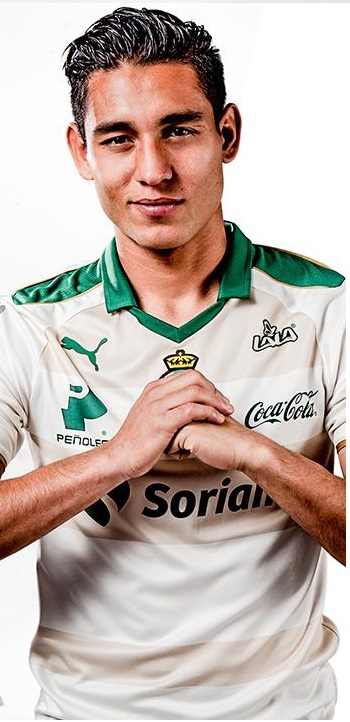
- Sandoval with Santos Laguna in 2017

Personal information
- Full name: Walter Gael Sandoval Contreras
- Date of birth: 5 November 1995 (age 31)
- Place of birth: Guadalajara, Jalisco, Mexico
- Height: 1.70 m (5 ft 7 in)
- Position: Midfielder

Team information
- Current team: Comunicaciones

Youth career
- 2009–2010: Guadalajara
- 2010–2011: Club Oro
- 2010–2012: Tecos
- 2012–2014: Santos Laguna

Senior career*
Years	Team	Apps	(Gls)
2012	Tecos	1	(0)
2013–2017	Santos Laguna	49	(2)
2015–2016	→ Juárez (loan)	35	(0)
2018–2022	Guadalajara	42	(2)
2019	→ Juárez (loan)	1	(0)
2020	→ Santos Laguna (loan)	14	(3)
2021	→ Mazatlán (loan)	17	(0)
2022	→ Wellington Phoenix (loan)	20	(6)
2023	Tepatitlán	0	(0)
2023	Vancouver FC	13	(1)
2023–2024	UdeG	29	(4)
2025	Alianza	6	(1)
2026–	Comunicaciones	0	(0)
- * Club domestic league appearances and goals as of 19 August 2025

Walter Gael Sandoval Contreras (born 5 November 1995) is a Mexican professional footballer who plays as a midfielder for Liga Bantrab club Comunicaciones.

== Club career ==
=== Youth career ===
Sandoval played for many academies in the state of his native Jalisco, starting with Club Oro in 2010 and then settled with Estudiantes Tecos, until they were dissolved in 2012. Santos Laguna signed him to play for their under 17s shortly after. He went on trial with Roma in 2013, but was not signed.

=== Santos Laguna ===
In 2012, Sandoval moved to Santos Laguna. He made his Liga MX debut on July 17, 2016, against Tigres UANL coming in as substitute.

==== Loan at Juárez ====
In the summer of 2015, Sandoval joined Juárez on a one-year loan in the Ascenso MX, to gain professional playing experience. In his first season, he won the Liga Ascenso Apertura 2015.

=== Guadalajara ===
It was confirmed on November 18, 2017, that Sandoval will play for Guadalajara.

==== Loans ====
On 9 January 2020, Sandoval returned to Juárez, joining the club on a six-months loan.

On 10 July 2020, Sandoval returned to Santos Laguna on loan, for the Apertura 2020.

In December 2020, Sandoval was loaned out to Mazatlán FC, wearing the squad number 1, a number typically used by goalkeepers.

In December 2021, Sandoval joined New Zealand A-League club Wellington Phoenix on loan until the end of the season.

=== Tepatitlán ===
On 15 January 2023, after being without a club for six months, Sandoval joined Liga Expansión club Tepatitlán on a free transfer. Shortly after, on 6 February 2023, and without playing a game, he agreed a mutual termination with the club, with the intent of joining a MLS club.

=== Vancouver FC ===
Instead of a MLS club, on 1 March 2023, Sandoval joined Canadian Premier League club Vancouver FC as their marquee signing. On 13 July 2023, after a disappointing stint at the club, he and the team agreed on a mutual contract termination.

=== Leones Negros ===
On 27 July 2023, returned to Mexico to join his hometown club Leones Negros in Liga de Expansión MX.

== Career statistics ==
As of 10 May 2024

Appearances and goals by club, season and competition
Club	Season	League			Cup (Note: Appearances in Copa MX, Australia Cup and Canadian Championship)		Other (Note: Appearances in Copa Libertadores, CONCACAF Champions Cup and FIFA Club World Cup)		Total	
Club	Season	Division	Apps	Goals	Apps	Goals	Apps	Goals	Apps	Goals
Tecos	2012–13	Ascenso MX	1	0	—		—		1	0
Santos Laguna	2013–14	Liga MX	0	0	4	0	—		4	0
Santos Laguna	2014–15	Liga MX	0	0	—		1	0	1	0
Santos Laguna	2016–17	Liga MX	35	2	8	0	—		43	2
Santos Laguna	2017–18	Liga MX	14	0	2	0	—		16	0
Santos Laguna	Total		49	2	14	0	1	0	64	2
Juárez (loan)	2015–16	Ascenso MX	35	0	3	0	—		38	0
Guadalajara	2017–18	Liga MX	13	0	—		3	0	16	0
Guadalajara	2018–19	Liga MX	22	2	5	2	2	1	29	5
Guadalajara	2019–20	Liga MX	7	0	4	0	—		11	0
Guadalajara	Total		42	2	9	2	5	1	56	5
Juárez (loan)	2019–20	Liga MX	1	0	3	0	—		4	0
Santos Laguna (loan)	2020–21	Liga MX	14	3	—		—		14	3
Mazatlán (loan)	2020–21	Liga MX	14	0	—		—		14	0
Mazatlán (loan)	2021–22	Liga MX	3	0	—		—		3	0
Mazatlán (loan)	Total		17	0	0	0	0	0	17	0
Wellington Phoenix (loan)	2021–22	A-League	20	6	1	0	—		21	6
Vancouver FC	2023	Canadian Premier League	12	1	1	0	—		13	1
Leones Negros	2023–24	Liga de Expansión MX	28	4	—		—		28	4
Career total			219	18	31	2	6	1	256	21

== Honours ==
Santos Laguna

- Liga MX: Clausura 2015
- Copa MX: Apertura 2014
- Campeón de Campeones: 2015

Guadalajara

- CONCACAF Champions League: 2018

Individual

- Liga MX Best Rookie: 2016–17
