= Alan Pulido =

Mexican footballer (born 1991)

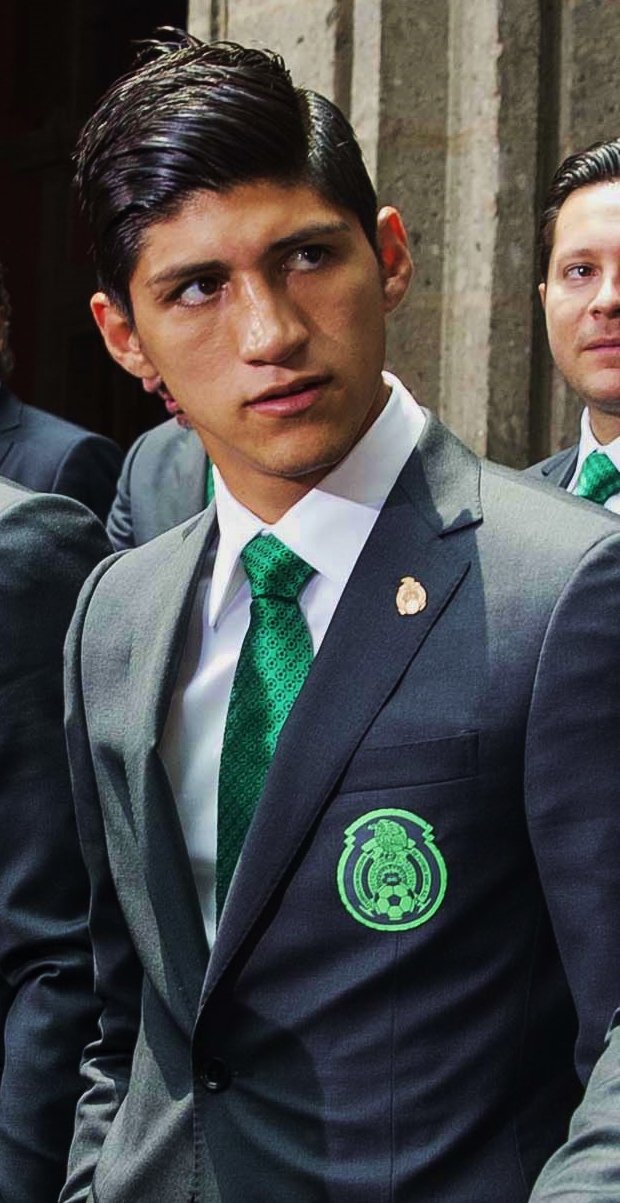
- Pulido in 2014

Personal information
- Full name: Alan Pulido Izaguirre
- Date of birth: 8 March 1991 (age 35)
- Place of birth: Ciudad Victoria, Tamaulipas, Mexico
- Height: 1.77 m (5 ft 10 in)
- Position: Striker

Youth career
- 2007–2010: UANL

Senior career*
Years	Team	Apps	(Gls)
2009	Tigres B	12	(1)
2010–2014	UANL	105	(23)
2015	Levadiakos	6	(1)
2015–2016	Olympiacos	8	(5)
2016–2019	Guadalajara	97	(34)
2020–2024	Sporting Kansas City	92	(35)
2025–2026	Guadalajara	16	(2)

International career^{‡}
2011	Mexico U20	12	(4)
2012	Mexico U23	12	(11)
2014–2021	Mexico	20	(5)
Medal record
Men's football
Representing Mexico
CONCACAF Gold Cup
Runner-up	2021 United States	Team
Olympic Qualifying Championship
Winner	2012 United States
Toulon Tournament
Winner	2012 France	Team
FIFA U-20 World Cup
Third place	2011 Colombia	Team
- * Club domestic league appearances and goals as of 3 December 2025 ‡ National team caps and goals as of 1 August 2021

Alan Pulido Izaguirre (born 8 March 1991) is a Mexican professional footballer who plays as a striker.

Pulido began his career at UANL, having his professional debut in 2009. Contractual disagreements with the club led to his absence from the 2014 Apertura tournament. In February 2015, Pulido moved abroad to join Greek club Levadiakos, before signing for Olympiacos in the summer of that year. The following season, he won the Greek Super League. In August 2016, he joined Guadalajara for what was then a club-record fee of US$7.15 million. Winning the league Double, the 2018 CONCACAF Champions League, and various individual accolades, in December 2019, Pulido transferred to Sporting Kansas City, a move which set a new transfer record for the club.

Pulido represented the under-20, under-23, and senior Mexico national teams. He was called up to participate in the 2011 Copa América, the 2014 FIFA World Cup and the 2021 CONCACAF Gold Cup.

== Club career ==
=== UANL ===
Pulido started his career at the youth academy of UANL. He made his professional debut on 20 June 2009 in a SuperLiga match against MLS side Chivas USA, scoring his first goal in the 11th minute.

On 27 February 2010, Pulido made his Liga MX debut coming on as a substitute after the half-time break in the 0–3 defeat to Monarcas Morelia. He scored his first league goal on 13 April 2011 in the 4–2 win over Pachuca at the Estadio Universitario.

Pulido scored the third goal in the 3–1 second-leg victory of the 2011 Apertura Final against Santos Laguna on 11 December, winning his first league title and helping secure the club's third league title, the first in over thirty years. Throughout the tournament, Pulido was subdued to a substitute role, behind first-choice striker Héctor Mancilla, and received limited playing time.

He was a pivotal piece in the club's winning of the Clausura 2014 Copa MX, where he finished with the tournament's top scorer, scoring 11 times within 10 matches.

==== Transfer dispute ====
After participating with the Mexico national football team at the 2014 World Cup, Pulido was meant to rejoin Tigres to prepare for the upcoming 2014 Apertura tournament. After alleged interest from several European clubs, among them Greek side Olympiacos, Pulido stated that his contract with Tigres had ended and was thus a free agent, though club personnel claimed Pulido had signed a contract extension that would keep him with the club until June 2016. Pulido did not attend any of the club's pre-season training sessions and was separated from the first team and sent to train with the reserves as a result, with Pulido also failing to appear at the training sessions. He subsequently did not participate in the Apertura tournament.

In November of that year, Pulido and his representative started a legal dispute against Tigres via the Mexican Football Federation, claiming the signature on the addendum of the contract was falsified. The Federation ultimately ruled in favor of Tigres, though another complaint was filed with the Court of Arbitration for Sport (CAS).

=== Levadiakos ===
On 29 January 2015, it was reported that Pulido had signed a one-and-a-half-year contract with Greek club Levadiakos, with the deal being confirmed by both Pulido – who announced the transfer via his Twitter account – and the club. However that same day, Tigres issued a press release declaring that CAS had ruled in their favor and would reject the transfer, with the court stating that ‘there is not a risk of irreparable damage to the player, because such damage, if exists, is caused by the player himself who decided not to re-join Tigres’. Pulido's request for a provisional transfer had also been denied by CAS, though another request was submitted to FIFA. On 2 February, Pulido participated in his first training session with Levadiakos. On 27 February, a provisional transfer was granted to Pulido by FIFA's Player's Status Committee, thus allowing him to play for Levadiakos while the legal dispute continued.

On 9 March 2015, Pulido scored on his official league debut with Levadiakos in the 3–1 win against Platanias, and was named man of the match.

He completed the campaign with six games played and one goal scored as Levadiakos finished 14th in the table

=== Olympiacos ===
On 3 July 2015, Olympiacos announced the signing of Pulido from Levadiakos. Prior to the move, Mexican club Guadalajara claimed they had purchased fifty percent of the player's rights during the annual league draft, and were awaiting on a verdict from the resolution from CAS in favor of UANL, who as a result could negotiate with Guadalajara over Pulido.

On 13 January 2016, Pulido started his first match for Olympiacos in the Greek Football Cup match against Chania, scoring the fifth goal in the 6–0 victory. On 18 January, he made his debut with the club in the Super League in a 0–0 draw game against Platanias. Five days later, Pulido played all 90 minutes and scored the only goal in a 1–0 victory against Skoda Xanthi. On 28 February, Pulido scored the third goal in the 3–0 win over Veria, meaning Olympiacos won the league with six matches to spare, 21 points clear of second-place AEK Athens.

=== Guadalajara ===
On 30 August 2016 it was announced that Pulido was returning to Mexico to play for Guadalajara for a reported US$7.15 million(€6 million), making Pulido Guadalajara's most expensive signing at the time. Pulido made his league debut with Guadalajara on 10 September, coming on as a substitute in the second half in a 2–0 victory over Chiapas. The following week, he scored his first goal with the club in a 2–1 loss against Toluca.

In April 2017, Guadalajara won the Clausura Copa MX final against Monarcas Morelia after defeating them in a penalty shoot-out in which he scored. The following month, the Clausura championship was disputed against his former club, UANL. In the first leg at Estadio Universitario, he scored the first goal in a 2–2 draw. In the return leg at Estadio Chivas, he scored the first goal of the match again — a goal named as Goal of the Tournament — this time the final score being 2–1 in Guadalajara's favor meaning they were crowned champions for the first time since the Apertura 2006 and won their first Double since the 1969–70 season. He was included in the Clausura's Best XI and named as the tournament's most valuable player as well.

On 17 April 2018, during the first leg of the CONCACAF Champions League finals against Major League Soccer club Toronto FC, Pulido would score from a free kick, helping his team attain a 2–1 victory — the goal was named as Goal of the Tournament. Guadalajara went on to win the finals after defeating them in a penalty shoot-out 4–2 following a 3–3 aggregate draw; managing to score during the shoot-out.

Pulido finished the Apertura 2019 as one of the joint top goalscorers with 12 goals and was the first Mexican to score the most goals in a tournament since Ángel Reyna in the Clausura 2011 with 11 goals. Pulido was subsequently awarded the Golden Boot and included in the Apertura's Best XI.

=== Sporting Kansas City ===
On 11 December 2019 it was announced that Pulido would play for Major League Soccer club Sporting Kansas City on a four-year contract for a reported US$9.5 million (€9.2 million) as a Designated Player, making his transfer the most expensive in the history of the club.

On 29 February 2020, Pulido scored a goal in his debut match against Vancouver Whitecaps in a 3–1 victory. On 3 October, he returned to the lineup following a hamstring injury and scored his first brace in a 2–1 victory over Houston Dynamo, leading him to being named MLS Player of the Week.

At the end of the regular season, Pulido was nominated as a finalist for that year's MLS Newcomer of the Year Award and was awarded the club's Offensive Player of the Year award.

In June 2023, Pulido won the MLS Player of the Month award for the first time, scoring 6 goals and chipping in an assist in 5 games. He became the first Sporting Kansas City player in five years and the fourth Mexican player to win the award.

=== Return to Guadalajara ===
On 7 January 2025, Guadalajara reached an agreement to sign Pulido. On 15 April 2026, Pulido and Guadalajara mutually parted ways after the forward had been dropped from the squad on disciplinary grounds.

== International career ==
=== Youth ===
Pulido scored three goals in the group stage of the 2011 CONCACAF U-20 Championship in Guatemala and helped Mexico win the tournament and qualify to the under-20 World Cup in Colombia held that same year.

Pulido was included in the roster that participated at said tournament, as Mexico placed third.

Pulido received his first call up to the senior national team by Luis Fernando Tena for the 2011 Copa América, a team largely composed of under-23 players due to the close proximity of the recently concluded Gold Cup, but did not appear in any matches.

On 23 March 2012, Pulido scored the opening goal in Mexico's 7–1 win over Trinidad and Tobago in the 2012 CONCACAF Olympic Qualifying Tournament held in the United States. Two days later, he scored a hat-trick in Mexico's 3–0 victory over Honduras. His fifth goal came in the semi-final match against Canada, making him joint-top-scorer, along with teammate Marco Fabián.

In the summer of that year, Mexico won the Toulon Tournament, with Pulido scoring his only goal in the competition in the 3–0 win over Turkey in the Final.

=== Senior ===
On 29 January 2014, Pulido scored a hat-trick on his debut appearance against South Korea, with Mexico going on to win the match 4–0. On 2 April, he scored the second goal in the 2–2 draw against the United States in a friendly match at the University of Phoenix Stadium.

On 2 June 2014, Pulido was named in Mexico's squad for the World Cup in Brazil. He did not appear in any match.

Pulido was originally included in the roster for the 2017 Gold Cup, but withdrew from the list after picking up an injury in a friendly match against Paraguay and was subsequently replaced by Erick Torres Padilla.

== Kidnapping ==
On 28 May 2016, Pulido attended a party with his girlfriend in a rural area in Ciudad Victoria, Tamaulipas. After leaving the party at 11:30 p.m., Pulido and his girlfriend were then forcibly taken by six masked gunmen. His girlfriend was later released unharmed. His family were concerned with his health and safety and sought assistance from the local police. On 30 May Pulido managed to escape his captors by overpowering one of his guards and taking one of their guns. The other captor fled from the scene after Pulido destroyed the windows of the room he was in. After contacting authorities, Pulido was sent to a hospital for medical examination and only suffered a minor injury in his hand caused by breaking the window.

== Personal life ==
Alan's older brother, Armando, is a former professional footballer.

== Career statistics ==
=== Club ===
As of match played 12 March 2025

Appearances and goals by club, season and competition
Club	Season	League			National cup (Note: Includes Copa MX, Greek Cup and U.S. Open Cup)		Continental (Note: Includes North American SuperLiga, CONCACAF Champions League/Cup, UEFA Champions League and UEFA Europa League)		Other		Total	
Club	Season	Division	Apps	Goals	Apps	Goals	Apps	Goals	Apps	Goals	Apps	Goals
UANL	2009–10	Mexican Primera División	4	0	—		3	1	—		7	1
UANL	2010–11	Mexican Primera División	16	3	—		—		—		16	3
UANL	2011–12	Mexican Primera División	28	2	—		2	2	—		30	4
UANL	2012–13	Liga MX	21	4	—		8	4	—		29	8
UANL	2013–14	Liga MX	36	14	9	11	—		—		45	25
UANL	Total		105	23	9	11	13	7	—		127	41
Levadiakos	2014–15	Super League Greece	6	1	—		—		—		6	1
Olympiacos	2015–16	Super League Greece	8	5	6	1	2	0	—		16	6
Olympiacos	2016–17	Super League Greece	—		—		1	0	—		1	0
Olympiacos	Total		8	5	6	1	3	0	—		17	6
Guadalajara	2016–17	Liga MX	33	11	8	3	—		—		41	14
Guadalajara	2017–18	Liga MX	18	4	—		7	2	—		25	6
Guadalajara	2018–19	Liga MX	28	7	4	2	—		1 (Note: Appearance in FIFA Club World Cup)	0	33	9
Guadalajara	2019–20	Liga MX	18	12	—		—		—		18	12
Guadalajara	Total		97	34	12	5	7	2	1	0	117	41
Sporting Kansas City	2020	MLS	12 (Note: Includes three appearances and one goal in the MLS is Back Tournament group stage)	6	—		—		2 (Note: Appearances in MLS is Back Tournament knockout stage)	1	14	7
Sporting Kansas City	2021	MLS	21	8	—		—		1 (Note: Appearance in MLS Cup playoffs)	0	22	8
Sporting Kansas City	2022	MLS	—		—		—		—		—	
Sporting Kansas City	2023	MLS	28	14	1	1	—		5 (Note: One appearance in Leagues Cup, four appearances in MLS Cup playoffs)	0	34	15
Sporting Kansas City	2024	MLS	31	7	5	1	—		2 (Note: Appearances in Leagues Cup)	0	38	8
Sporting Kansas City	Total		92	35	6	2	—		10	1	108	38
Guadalajara	2024–25	Liga MX	5	2	—		3	0	0	0	8	2
Career total			313	100	33	19	26	9	11	1	383	129

=== International ===
As of 1 August 2021

Appearances and goals by national team and year
National team	Year	Apps	Goals
Mexico	2014	6	4
Mexico	2016	1	0
Mexico	2017	2	1
Mexico	2018	4	0
Mexico	2020	1	0
Mexico	2021	6	0
Total		20	5

Scores and results list Mexico's goal tally first, score column indicates score after each Pulido goal.

List of international goals scored by Alan Pulido
No.	Date	Venue	Opponent	Score	Result	Competition
1	29 January 2014	Alamodome, San Antonio, United States	South Korea	2–0	4–0	Friendly
2	29 January 2014	Alamodome, San Antonio, United States	South Korea	3–0	4–0	Friendly
3	29 January 2014	Alamodome, San Antonio, United States	South Korea	4–0	4–0	Friendly
4	2 April 2014	University of Phoenix Stadium, Glendale, United States	United States	2–2	2–2	Friendly
5	8 February 2017	Sam Boyd Stadium, Whitney, United States	Iceland	1–0	1–0	Friendly

== Honours ==
UANL

- Mexican Primera División: Apertura 2011
- Copa MX: Clausura 2014

Olympiacos

- Super League Greece: 2015–16, 2016–17

Sporting Kansas City

- Western Conference Regular Season: 2020

Guadalajara

- Liga MX: Clausura 2017
- Copa MX: Clausura 2017
- CONCACAF Champions League: 2018

Mexico Youth

- CONCACAF Olympic Qualifying Championship: 2012
- Toulon Tournament: 2012

Individual

- CONCACAF Olympic Qualifying Championship Golden Boot: 2012 (Shared)
- Copa MX Top Scorer: Clausura 2014
- Liga MX Best XI: Clausura 2017, Apertura 2019
- Liga MX Most Valuable Player: Clausura 2017
- Liga MX Best Goal: 2016–17
- Liga MX Player of the Month: November 2019
- CONCACAF Champions League Goal of the Tournament: 2018
- CONCACAF Goal of the Year: 2018 (2nd place)
- Liga MX Golden Boot: Apertura 2019 (Shared)
- Sporting Kansas City Offensive Player of the Year: 2020
- MLS Player of the Month: June 2023
- MLS Comeback Player of the Year: 2023
