= Ángel Zaldívar =

Mexican footballer (born 1994)

Personal information
- Full name: Ángel Zaldívar Caviedes
- Date of birth: 8 February 1994 (age 32)
- Place of birth: Guadalajara, Jalisco, Mexico
- Height: 1.78 m (5 ft 10 in)
- Position: Forward

Team information
- Current team: Alajuelense
- Number: 9

Youth career
- Guadalajara

Senior career*
Years	Team	Apps	(Gls)
2013–2023	Guadalajara	174	(34)
2015	→ Coras (loan)	10	(3)
2019	→ Monterrey (loan)	16	(1)
2020	→ Puebla (loan)	9	(2)
2023	→ Atlético San Luis (loan)	31	(5)
2024–2025	Juárez	28	(9)
2026–	Alajuelense	20	(3)

International career
2015–2016	Mexico U23	8	(2)
2016–2018	Mexico	6	(0)
- * Club domestic league appearances and goals as of 9 December 2023

Ángel Zaldívar Caviedes (born 8 February 1994) is a Mexican professional footballer who plays as a forward and currently plays for Alajuelense.

== Club career ==
=== Guadalajara ===
Zaldívar made his official debut on 28 July 2013 in a home game against Querétaro F.C. He scored his first league goal in a match against Chiapas F.C. in which the team tied 1–1 in the last minute.

==== Coras (loan) ====
He was sent out on loan to Coras de Tepic in 2015 in order to gain playing time and experience.

=== Return to Guadalajara ===
On his return to Guadalajara he scored his first and second league goals against C.F. Pachuca which ended in a 4–4 draw. Zaldivar scored his 1st 2016 league goal and 4th professional goal with Guadalajara against Puebla to make the game 2–0 which the game ended in a 3–0 win for C.D. Guadalajara. He is a favorite when it comes to penalties, where his shooting abilities shine.

==== Monterrey (loan) ====
On January 1, 2019, it was announced that Zaldivar had joined Monterrey on loan for 1 year. On January 5, 2019, he made his debut in a 5–0 win against Pachuca he scored in the 84th minute.

==== Puebla (loan) ====
On January 3, 2020 Puebla announced that they had acquired Zaldivar for a 6-month loan.

== Career statistics ==
=== Club ===
As of match played 9 December 2023

Club	Season	League			Cup		Continental		Total	
Club	Season	Division	Apps	Goals	Apps	Goals	Apps	Goals	Apps	Goals
Guadalajara	2012–13	Liga MX	1	0	—		—		1	0
Guadalajara	2013–14	Liga MX	15	1	7	0	—		22	1
Guadalajara	2014–15	Liga MX	4	0	2	0	—		6	0
Guadalajara	2015–16	Liga MX	23	3	12 (Note: includes 1 match from the 2016 Supercopa MX)	3	—		35	6
Guadalajara	2016–17	Liga MX	32	9	15 (Note: includes one match from the 2017 Campeón de Campeones)	2	—		47	11
Guadalajara	2017–18	Liga MX	19	2	4	1	3 (Note: Appearances in CONCACAF Champions League)	0	26	3
Guadalajara	2018–19	Liga MX	17	6	1	0	2 (Note: Appearances in FIFA Club World Cup)	1	20	7
Guadalajara	2020–21	Liga MX	19	2	—		—		19	2
Guadalajara	2021–22	Liga MX	29	7	—		—		29	7
Guadalajara	2022–23	Liga MX	15	4	–		—		15	4
Guadalajara	Total		174	34	41	6	5	1	220	41
Coras (loan)	2014–15	Ascenso MX	10	3	2	0	—		12	3
Monterrey (loan)	2018–19	Liga MX	13	1	—		2	0	15	1
Monterrey (loan)	2019–20	Liga MX	3	0	4	2	1	0	8	2
Monterrey (loan)	Total		16	1	4	2	3	0	23	3
Puebla (loan)	2019–20	Liga MX	9	2	—		—		9	2
Atlético San Luis (loan)	2022–23	Liga MX	18	1	—		—		18	1
Atlético San Luis (loan)	2023–24	Liga MX	13	4	—		2 (Note: Appearances in Leagues Cup)	0	15	4
Atlético San Luis (loan)	Total		31	5	—		2	0	33	5
Career total			240	45	47	8	10	1	297	54

=== International ===
As of match played 21 November 2018

National team	Year	Apps	Goals
Mexico	2016	1	0
Mexico	2018	5	0
Total		6	0

== Honours ==
Guadalajara

- Liga MX: Clausura 2017
- Copa MX: Apertura 2015, Clausura 2017
- Supercopa MX: 2016
- CONCACAF Champions League: 2018

Monterrey

- Liga MX: Apertura 2019
- CONCACAF Champions League: 2019

Mexico Youth

- Central American and Caribbean Games: 2014
- Pan American Silver Medal: 2015
