= Alejandro Mayorga =

Mexican footballer (born 1997)

Personal information
- Full name: Manuel Alejandro Mayorga Almaraz
- Date of birth: 29 May 1997 (age 29)
- Place of birth: Durango, Mexico
- Height: 1.78 m (5 ft 10 in)
- Position: Left-back

Team information
- Current team: Juárez
- Number: 4

Youth career
- 2001–2009: Centauros
- 2009–2010: Alacranes de Durango
- 2010–2014: Pachuca
- 2014–2017: Guadalajara

Senior career*
Years	Team	Apps	(Gls)
2017–2023	Guadalajara	55	(5)
2018	→ Necaxa (loan)	11	(0)
2019–2020	→ UNAM (loan)	29	(1)
2022	→ Cruz Azul (loan)	19	(0)
2024–2025	Necaxa	39	(0)
2025–	Juárez	44	(0)

International career^{‡}
2015	Mexico U18	2	(0)
2017	Mexico U20	6	(0)
2021	Mexico U23	5	(0)
Medal record
Representing Mexico
Men's football
Olympic Qualifying Championship
Winner	2020 Mexico
- * Club domestic league appearances and goals as of 20 October 2026 ‡ National team caps and goals as of 8 June 2021

Manuel Alejandro Mayorga Almaraz (born 29 May 1997), nicknamed El Tren ("The Train"), is a Mexican professional footballer who plays as a left-back for Liga MX club Juárez.

== Early life ==
Mayorga joined Guadalajara's youth academy in 2014.

== Club career ==
=== Guadalajara ===
==== 2017–18: Debut season and CONCACAF Champions League title ====
He made his Liga MX debut under manager Matías Almeyda on 5 August 2017 in a 2–2 draw against Club Necaxa.

Making three appearances and scoring one goal in the 2018 CONCACAF Champions League in which Guadalajara won, he was included in the tournament's Best XI.

==== 2018–19: Loan to Necaxa ====
In June 2018, he joined Necaxa on loan for the 2018 Apertura.

==== 2019–20: Loan to UNAM ====
In December 2019, he joined Pumas UNAM on loan for 2020. On 12 January 2020, he made his debut against C.F. Pachuca in a 2–1 win. On 30 August, he scored his first goal with the team against Club Tijuana in a 3–0 victory. Following an impressive Guardianes 2020 performance, in which Pumas U.N.A.M. managed to reach the championship final, Mayorga returned to Guadalajara.

==== 2021–22: Loan to Cruz Azul ====
On 5 January 2022, Mayorga joined Cruz Azul on a one-year loan, with an option to join the club permanently. He returned to Guadalajara at the end on his loan. In April 2023, he reached 100 games played with Chivas.

=== Return to Necaxa ===
On 10 January 2024, Mayorga permanently joined Necaxa.

== International career ==
=== Youth ===
Mayorga was called up by Marco Antonio Ruiz for the 2017 CONCACAF U-20 Championship. Mayorga started in all of the national team's matches in the 2017 FIFA U-20 World Cup in South Korea.

Mayorga participated at the 2020 CONCACAF Olympic Qualifying Championship, appearing in four matches, where Mexico won the competition.

=== Senior ===
Mayorga and Edson Álvarez were given the opportunity by Juan Carlos Osorio to be supporting practice squad players with the senior national team that participated at the 2017 Confederations Cup. At the conclusion of the tournament, he got his first call up to the senior national side in the preliminary list for the subsequent Gold Cup, all before his Liga MX debut. He eventually made it to the official 23-man list.

== Career statistics ==
=== Club ===
As of match played on 20 October 2026

Appearances and goals by club, season and competition
Club	Season	League			Cup		Continental		Other		Total	
Club	Season	Division	Apps	Goals	Apps	Goals	Apps	Goals	Apps	Goals	Apps	Goals
Guadalajara	2017–18	Liga MX	4	0	4	0	3 (Note: Appearances in CONCACAF Champions League)	1	—		11	1
Guadalajara	2018–19	Liga MX	3	0	4	0	—		—		7	0
Guadalajara	2019–20	Liga MX	4	0	2	1	—		—		6	1
Guadalajara	2020–21	Liga MX	10	2	—		—		—		10	2
Guadalajara	2021–22	Liga MX	14	2	—		—		—		14	2
Guadalajara	2022–23	Liga MX	13	1	5 (Note: Appearances in Copa Sky por México)	0	—		—		18	1
Guadalajara	2023–24	Liga MX	7	0	—		—		—		7	0
Guadalajara	Total		55	5	15	1	3	1	—		73	7
Necaxa (loan)	2018–19	Liga MX	11	0	3	0	—		—		14	0
UNAM (loan)	2019–20	Liga MX	10	0	2	1	—		—		12	1
UNAM (loan)	2020–21	Liga MX	19	1	2 (Note: Appearances in Copa GNP por México)	0	—		—		21	1
UNAM (loan)	Total		29	1	4	1	—		—		33	2
Cruz Azul (loan)	2021–22	Liga MX	14	0	1 (Note: Appearance in Supercopa MX)	0	3	0	—		18	0
Cruz Azul (loan)	2022–23	Liga MX	5	0	—		—		—		5	0
Cruz Azul (loan)	Total		19	0	1	0	3	0	—		23	0
Necaxa	2023–24	Liga MX	8	0	—		—		—		8	0
Necaxa	2024–25	Liga MX	31	0	—		—		2 (Note: Appearances in Leagues Cup)	0	33	0
Necaxa	Total		39	0	—		—		2	0	41	0
Juárez	2025–26	Liga MX	34	0	—		—		3	0	37	0
Juárez	2026–27	Liga MX	10	0	—		—		2	0	12	0
Juárez	Total		44	0	—		—		5	0	49	0
Career total			197	6	23	2	6	1	7	0	233	9

== Honours ==
Guadalajara

- CONCACAF Champions League: 2018

Necaxa

- Supercopa MX: 2018

Cruz Azul

- Supercopa MX: 2022

Mexico U23

- CONCACAF Olympic Qualifying Championship: 2020

Individual

- CONCACAF Champions League Best XI: 2018
