= Jesús Godínez =

Mexican footballer (born 1997)

Personal information
- Full name: José de Jesús Godínez Navarro
- Date of birth: 20 January 1997 (age 29)
- Place of birth: Guadalajara, Jalisco, Mexico
- Height: 1.84 m (6 ft 0 in)
- Position: Forward

Team information
- Current team: Tepatitlán
- Number: 23

Youth career
- 2012–2017: Guadalajara

Senior career*
Years	Team	Apps	(Gls)
2017–2023	Guadalajara	59	(6)
2019–2021	→ León (loan)	29	(0)
2021	→ Tapatío (loan)	3	(0)
2022	→ Querétaro (loan)	6	(0)
2022	→ Necaxa (loan)	11	(0)
2023	→ Herediano (loan)	53	(22)
2024	Nantong Zhiyun	21	(4)
2026–	Tepatitlán	3	(0)

International career^{‡}
2013–2014	Mexico U16	14	(6)
2014–2016	Mexico U18	6	(2)
2017	Mexico U20	8	(3)
2018	Mexico U21	5	(1)
2019	Mexico U23	8	(6)
2019	Mexico	1	(0)
Medal record
Men's football
Representing Mexico
Toulon Tournament
Third place	2019 France	Team
Runner-up	2018 France	Team
Pan American Games
Bronze medal – third place	2019 Lima	Team
- * Club domestic league appearances and goals as of 13 September 2026 ‡ National team caps and goals as of 3 October 2019

José de Jesús Godínez Navarro (born 20 January 1997) is a Mexican professional footballer who plays as a forward for Liga de Expansión MX club Tepatitlán.

== Club career ==
Godínez arrived at Guadalajara at age 9 and has played for Chivas Fuerzas Básicas: U17, U18, and U20. He was a part of the winning U17 team for Liga MX Apertura 2013 and Clausura 2014, and top goalscorer of both tournaments. As well as winning the U20 Clausura 2016. He made his professional debut under Argentine coach Matías Almeyda against Necaxa on 7 May 2017.

On 26 January 2024, Godínez signed with Chinese Super League club Nantong Zhiyun, and became the first Mexican player to play in the Chinese Super League.

== International career ==
=== Youth ===
Godínez was included in the under-21 roster that participated in the 2018 Toulon Tournament, where Mexico would finish runners-up.

Godínez was called up by Jaime Lozano to participate with the under-22 team at the 2019 Toulon Tournament, where Mexico won third place. He was called up by Lozano again to participate at the 2019 Pan American Games, with Mexico winning the third-place match.

=== Senior ===
Godínez made his senior national team debut on 2 October 2019 in a friendly against Trinidad & Tobago. He substituted the goalscorer José Juan Macías in the 74th minute.

== Career statistics ==
=== Club ===
As of 26 January 2024

Club	Season	League			Cup (Note: Includes Copa MX and Costa Rican Cup)		Continental		Other		Total	
Club	Season	Division	Apps	Goals	Apps	Goals	Apps	Goals	Apps	Goals	Apps	Goals
Guadalajara	2016–17	Liga MX	1	0	–		–		–		1	0
Guadalajara	2017–18	Liga MX	16	2	1	0	7 (Note: Appearances in CONCACAF Champions League)	1	–		24	3
Guadalajara	2018–19	Liga MX	17	0	7	2	–		2 (Note: Appearances in FIFA Club World Cup)	0	26	2
Guadalajara	2021–22	Liga MX	8	1	—		—		—		8	1
Guadalajara	Total		42	3	8	2	7	1	2	0	59	6
León (loan)	2019–20	Liga MX	13	0	—		1	0	—		14	0
León (loan)	2020–21	Liga MX	13	0	—		2	0	—		15	0
León (loan)	Total		26	0	—		3	0	—		29	0
Tapatío (loan)	2021–22	Liga de Expansión MX	3	0	—		—		—		3	0
Querétaro (loan)	2021–22	Liga MX	6	0	—		—		—		6	0
Necaxa (loan)	2022–23	Liga MX	11	0	—		—		—		11	0
Herediano (loan)	2022–23	Liga FPD	19	5	—		—		—		19	5
Herediano (loan)	2023–24	Liga FPD	24	14	1	0	8 (Note: Appearances in CONCACAF Central American Cup)	3	1 (Note: Appearance in Supercopa de Costa Rica)	0	34	17
Herediano (loan)	Total		43	19	1	0	8	3	1	0	53	22
Career total			131	22	9	2	18	4	3	0	161	28

=== International ===
As of match played on 3 October 2019

National team	Year	Apps	Goals
Mexico	2019	1	0
Total		1	0

== Honours ==
Guadalajara

- Liga MX: Clausura 2017
- CONCACAF Champions League: 2018

León

- Liga MX: Guardianes 2020

Mexico U23

- Pan American Bronze Medal: 2019
