= Michael Pérez (footballer) =

Mexican footballer (born 1993)

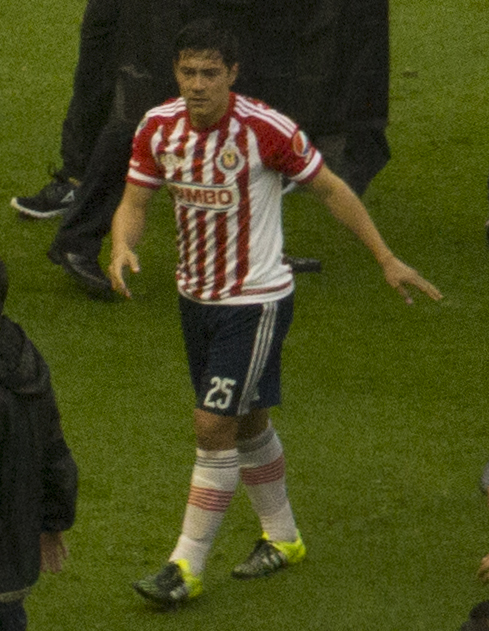
- Pérez with Guadalajara in 2015

Personal information
- Full name: Michael Pérez Ortiz
- Date of birth: 14 February 1993 (age 33)
- Place of birth: Zapopan, Jalisco, Mexico
- Height: 1.69 m (5 ft 7 in)
- Position: Defensive midfielder

Senior career*
Years	Team	Apps	(Gls)
2012–2021	Guadalajara	93	(2)
2014–2015	→ Coras (loan)	19	(1)
2019	→ Querétaro (loan)	4	(0)
2020	→ Sinaloa (loan)	10	(0)
2021	→ Tapatío (loan)	5	(0)
2021–2023	Cancún	54	(4)
2023	Real España	5	(0)
2024	Sporting	10	(0)

International career
2015–2016	Mexico U22	7	(1)
- * Club domestic league appearances and goals as of 21 October 2022

Michael Pérez Ortiz (born 14 February 1993), also known as El Tortas, is a Mexican professional footballer who plays as a defensive midfielder for Liga de Expansión MX club Cancún.

== Club career ==
=== Youth ===
Pérez joined Guadalajara's youth academy in 2008. He continued through Chivas Youth Academy getting to play through Chivas ranks from U-17 and U-20. Until finally reaching the first team, John van 't Schip being the coach promoting Pérez to first team in 2012.

=== Guadalajara ===
He made his official debut under Dutch coach John van 't Schip as a substitute in a game against Chiapas on 14 October 2013 which he played all 22 minutes.

==== Loan at Coras ====
Pérez was loaned out to Coras for 2014–15 season. He made his official debut as a starter on 1 August 2014 at home against Correcaminos UAT.

== Honours ==
Guadalajara

- Liga MX: Clausura 2017
- Copa MX: Apertura 2015, Clausura 2017
- Supercopa MX: 2016
- CONCACAF Champions League: 2018

Mexico U22

- Pan American Silver Medal: 2015
