= Miguel Basulto =

Mexican footballer (born 1992)

Personal information
- Full name: Juan Miguel Basulto Medina
- Date of birth: 7 January 1992 (age 34)
- Place of birth: Ocotlán, Jalisco, Mexico
- Height: 1.83 m (6 ft 0 in)
- Position: Centre-back

Team information
- Current team: Penya Encarnada d'Andorra
- Number: 3

Senior career*
| Years | Team | Apps | (Gls) |
| 2013–2021 | Guadalajara | 34 | (0) |
| 2014 | → UdeG (loan) | 6 | (0) |
| 2014–2015 | → Coras (loan) | 24 | (1) |
| 2019–2020 | → Zacatepec (loan) | 24 | (4) |
| 2020–2021 | → Cancún (loan) | 32 | (4) |
| 2021–2024 | Herediano | 171 | (8) |
| 2025 | Santos de Guápiles FC | 7 | (2) |
| 2025 | FC Rànger's | 10 | (0) |
| 2026– | Penya Encarnada d'Andorra | 9 | (1) |

International career
| 2009 | Mexico U17 | 4 | (1) |
- * Club domestic league appearances and goals as of 15 June 2026

Juan Miguel Basulto Medina (born 7 January 1992) is a Mexican professional footballer that plays as a centre-back for Penya Encarnada d'Andorra in Andorra.

== Club career ==
=== Youth ===
Basulto joined Guadalajara's youth academy in 2008. Playing in the Chivas Youth Academy going through U-17 and U-20. Until finally reaching the first team, Benjamín Galindo being the coach promoting Basulto to first team.

=== Guadalajara ===
Basulto made his official debut under Mexican coach Benjamín Galindo in the Liga MX which was on January 11, 2013. He started with the first team against Santos Laguna which ended in a 2–0 defeat.

== Honours ==
Guadalajara

- Liga MX: Clausura 2017
- Copa MX: Apertura 2015, Clausura 2017
- Supercopa MX: 2016
- CONCACAF Champions League: 2018

Herediano

- Liga FPD: Apertura 2021
