= José Juan Macías =

Mexican footballer (born 1999)

Personal information
- Full name: José Juan Macías Guzmán
- Date of birth: 22 September 1999 (age 27)
- Place of birth: Guadalajara, Jalisco, Mexico
- Height: 1.78 m (5 ft 10 in)
- Position: Forward

Team information
- Current team: Pumas
- Number: 11

Youth career
- 2011–2017: Guadalajara

Senior career*
Years	Team	Apps	(Gls)
2017–2024	Guadalajara	76	(23)
2019	→ León (loan)	38	(19)
2021	→ Getafe (loan)	7	(0)
2024–2025	Santos Laguna	3	(1)
2025–	Pumas	11	(4)

International career^{‡}
2017	Mexico U18	5	(9)
2018–2019	Mexico U20	14	(11)
2018	Mexico U21	5	(0)
2021	Mexico U23	7	(1)
2019	Mexico	5	(4)
Medal record
Men's football
Representing Mexico
Olympic Qualifying Championship
Winner	2020 Mexico
Toulon Tournament
Runner-up	2018 France	Team
- * Club domestic league appearances and goals as of 18 October 2026 ‡ National team caps and goals as of 18 October 2026

José Juan "JJ" Macías Guzmán (born 22 September 1999) is a Mexican professional footballer who plays as a forward for Liga MX club Pumas.

Macías initiated his career at Guadalajara, making his professional debut in July 2017. He spent two seasons on loan at León, where his remarkable performances earned him a place in the Best XI for the Clausura 2019 tournament. In June 2022, he faced an injury that kept him off the field for 18 months. After a brief six‑month hiatus, he returned to football with Pumas.

== Club career ==
=== Guadalajara ===
==== 2017–18: Debut season and CONCACAF Champions League title ====
Macías began his career at the youth academy of his hometown club, Guadalajara. In June 2017, he was promoted to the senior squad by coach Matías Almeyda. On July 16, Macías made his professional debut in the Campeón de Campeones match against Tigres UANL. Six days later, he made his Liga MX debut in a match against Toluca. On August 8, Macías scored his first professional goal in a Copa MX match against Juárez. On October 28, he scored his first brace against Tijuana in a 3–1 home win.

==== 2018–20: Loan to León ====
On 9 December 2018, Macías joined León on a one-year loan with an option to buy. He scored eight goals during the regular phase of the 2019 Clausura, making him the top-scoring Mexican player in the tournament. Macías scored another two goals in the championship stage to take his total goal tally to ten as León progressed to the final. However, due to his commitment to represent Mexico at the U-20 World Cup, he was unable to play in the final. Macias' performances earned him a spot in the Best XI of the 2019 Clausura. He finished the 2019 Apertura with eight goals under his name.

==== 2020–21: Return to Guadalajara, top goalscorer, and injury ====
On 1 January 2020, Macías returned to Guadalajara after León failed to agree on personal terms with the player.

Before the start of the Clausura 2020, Guadalajara took part in a friendly tournament, the 2020 Copa por México. In the semifinal against Club América, Macías scored just 19 seconds into the match, the fastest goal in a Súper Clásico. He finished as the tournament's top scorer with four goals, but injury kept him out of the final against Cruz Azul, in which Guadalajara finished as runners-up.

==== 2021–22: Loan to Getafe ====
On 5 July 2021, Macías joined La Liga club Getafe on a season-long loan. He featured in eight matches overall before having his loan terminated early on 31 January 2022.

==== 2022–24: Return to Guadalajara, injury, and departure ====
On 30 June 2022, Macías suffered a major knee injury in training. On 3 December 2023, he made his first competitive appearance in 18 months. On 20 June 2024, Guadalajara released Macías.

=== Santos Laguna ===
On 23 June 2024, Macías joined Santos Laguna. After experiencing multiple injury setbacks, Macías was officially ruled out for an indefinite period on September 27. On 11 February 2025, Santos Laguna released Macías.

=== Pumas ===
In August 2025, Macías signed with Pumas. He made his debut for the club on 31 August, his first competitive appearance in seven months. On 9 November, he suffered a major injury during the final matchday of the regular season.

== International career ==
=== Youth ===
On 25 October 2018, Macías was called up by Diego Ramírez to participate in the 2018 CONCACAF U-20 Championship. He scored 10 goals in the tournament, including 4 against Aruba, winning him the Golden Boot of the tournament. As Mexico would finish runner-up in the tournament, he was listed in the Best XI of the tournament. In April 2019, Macías was included in the 21-player squad to represent Mexico at the U-20 World Cup in Poland.

Macías was included in the final roster that participated at the 2018 Toulon Tournament. He would go on to appear in three matches as Mexico finished runners-up.

Macías was included in the final roster that participated in the 2018 Central American and Caribbean Games. He appeared in two group stage matches as Mexico finished last in their group with one point.

Macías was called up by Jaime Lozano to participate at the 2020 CONCACAF Olympic Qualifying Championship, scoring one goal in four appearances, where Mexico won the competition. He was in the final roster for 2020 Summer Olympics but withdrew due to injury, being subsequently replaced by Adrián Mora.

=== Senior ===
On 2 October 2019, under Gerardo Martino, Macías earned his first cap with the senior national team in a friendly match against Trinidad and Tobago, scoring on his debut in the team's 2–0 victory. A couple of days later, he would score in both 2019–20 CONCACAF Nations League fixtures. The first against Bermuda, scoring his first brace with the national team winning 5–1, and the second against Panama, coming on as a substitute to help break a 1–1 deadlock, scoring Mexico's second goal in an eventual 3–1 victory.

== Career statistics ==
=== Club ===
As of 18 October 2026

Appearances and goals by club, season and competition
Club	Season	League			Cup (Note: Includes Copa MX, Copa del Rey)		Continental		Other		Total	
Club	Season	Division	Apps	Goals	Apps	Goals	Apps	Goals	Apps	Goals	Apps	Goals
Guadalajara	2016–17	Liga MX	—		1 (Note: Appearance in Campeón de Campeones)	0	—		—		1	0
Guadalajara	2017–18	Liga MX	16	3	5	1	6 (Note: Appearances in CONCACAF Champions Cup)	2	—		27	6
Guadalajara	2018–19	Liga MX	1	0	4	1	—		—		5	1
Guadalajara	2019–20	Liga MX	8	4	1	0	—		—		9	4
Guadalajara	2020–21	Liga MX	33	12	4 (Note: Appearances in Copa GNP por México)	4	—		—		37	16
Guadalajara	2021–22	Liga MX	11	4	—		—		—		11	4
Guadalajara	2022–23	Liga MX	—		—		—		—		—	
Guadalajara	2023–24	Liga MX	7	0	—		1	0	—		8	0
Guadalajara	Total		76	23	15	6	7	2	—		98	31
León (loan)	2018–19	Liga MX	18	10	2	0	—		—		20	10
León (loan)	2019–20	Liga MX	20	9	—		—		—		20	9
León (loan)	Total		38	19	2	0	—		—		40	19
Getafe (loan)	2021–22	La Liga	7	0	1	0	—		—		8	0
Santos Laguna	2023–24	Liga MX	—		—		—		2 (Note: Appearances in Leagues Cup)	0	2	0
Santos Laguna	2024–25	Liga MX	3	1	—		—		—		3	1
Santos Laguna	Total		3	1	—		—		2	0	5	1
Pumas	2025–26	Liga MX	11	4	—		—		—		11	4
Career total			135	47	18	6	7	2	2	0	162	55

=== International ===
As of match played on 19 November 2019

Appearances and goals by national team and year
National team	Year	Apps	Goals
Mexico	2019	5	4
Total		5	4

Scores and results list Mexico's goal tally first, score column indicates score after each Macías goal.

List of international goals scored by José Juan Macías
No.	Date	Venue	Opponent	Score	Result	Competition
1	2 October 2019	Estadio Nemesio Díez, Toluca, Mexico	Trinidad and Tobago	1–0	2–0	Friendly
2	11 October 2019	Bermuda National Stadium, Devonshire Parish, Bermuda	Bermuda	2–0	5–1	2019–20 CONCACAF Nations League A
3	11 October 2019	Bermuda National Stadium, Devonshire Parish, Bermuda	Bermuda	3–0	5–1	2019–20 CONCACAF Nations League A
4	15 October 2019	Estadio Azteca, Mexico City, Mexico	Panama	2–1	3–1	2019–20 CONCACAF Nations League A

== Honours ==
Guadalajara

- CONCACAF Champions League: 2018

Mexico U23

- CONCACAF Olympic Qualifying Championship: 2020

Individual

- CONCACAF Under-20 Championship Best XI: 2018
- CONCACAF Under-20 Championship Golden Boot: 2018
- Liga MX Best XI: Clausura 2019
- Liga MX Player of the Month: August 2019
