= Dieter Villalpando =

Mexican footballer (born 1991)

Personal information
- Full name: Dieter Daniel Villalpando Pérez
- Date of birth: 4 August 1991 (age 35)
- Place of birth: Mexico City, Mexico
- Height: 1.70 m (5 ft 7 in)
- Position: Midfielder

Team information
- Current team: Tepatitlán
- Number: 5

Youth career
- 2009–2010: Pachuca

Senior career*
Years	Team	Apps	(Gls)
2008–2009	Universidad del Fútbol	–	(–)
2010–2017	Pachuca	38	(2)
2010–2011	→ Tampico Madero (loan)	–	(–)
2011–2012	→ Tulancingo (loan)	–	(–)
2012–2013	→ Murciélagos (loan)	–	(–)
2013	→ Linces (loan)	–	(–)
2015	→ Tigres UANL (loan)	8	(0)
2015	→ Monarcas Morelia (loan)	10	(0)
2016	→ Atlas (loan)	14	(1)
2016–2017	→ Chiapas (loan)	32	(1)
2017–2018	→ Necaxa (loan)	24	(2)
2018	Necaxa	13	(2)
2019–2020	Guadalajara	39	(1)
2021	Puebla	3	(1)
2022	Necaxa	29	(0)
2023	Atlético San Luis	40	(4)
2024–2026	Juárez	60	(2)
2026	→ Everton (loan)	8	(0)
2026–	Tepatitlán	5	(1)

International career^{‡}
2023	Mexico	1	(0)
- * Club domestic league appearances and goals as of 13 September 2026 ‡ National team caps and goals as of 16 December 2023

Dieter Daniel Villalpando Pérez (born 4 August 1991) is a Mexican professional footballer who plays as a midfielder for Liga de Expansión MX club Tepatitlán.

== Career ==
Villalpando developed through the youth academy of Pachuca and made his Primera División debut during the Clausura 2014 tournament. That season, he featured regularly and contributed to the team's runner-up finish against León.

In 2015, he represented Tigres UANL in the Clausura and Morelia in the Apertura. With Tigres, he was part of the squad that finished as runner-up in the Copa Libertadores. In 2016, he joined Atlas before transferring to Chiapas midway through the year. His most active campaign came in the Clausura 2017, when he appeared in all 17 regular-season matches, starting 14, and accumulated 1,216 minutes of play.

Villalpando signed with Necaxa for the Apertura 2017. Although his participation was less consistent that semester, he played a significant role in 2018, helping the team secure both the Copa MX and the Supercopa MX. He also surpassed 1,000 minutes of league play and scored two goals across both tournaments.

He transferred to Guadalajara for the Clausura 2019. His contract was terminated in November 2020 following accusations of sexual abuse.

In the latter stages of his career, Villalpando played for Puebla, Necaxa, Atlético San Luis, and Juárez.

In January 2026, Villalpando moved to Chile and joined Everton de Viña del Mar. He was released on 18 June after suffering a car accident allegedly due to drunk driving.

After returning from Chile, his contract with FC Juárez was terminated, so in August 2026 he signed with Tepatitlán F.C. as a free agent.

== International ==
Villalpando made his debut for the senior Mexico national team on 16 December 2023 in a friendly against Colombia.

== Honours ==
Necaxa

- Copa MX: Clausura 2018
- Supercopa MX: 2018
