= 2016 Supercopa MX =

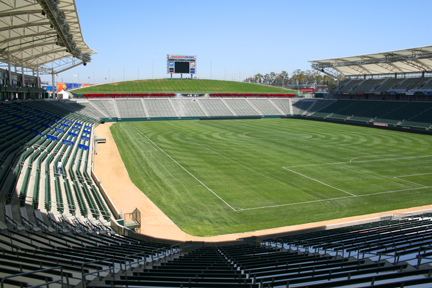
- StubHub Center, host of the match
- Event: 2016 Supercopa MX
Guadalajara	Veracruz
2	0
- Date: 10 July 2016
- Venue: StubHub Center, Carson, California, United States
- Referee: Alejandro Mariscal (United States)
- Attendance: 27,132

The 2016 Supercopa MX was a Mexican football match-up played on 10 July 2016 between the champions of the Apertura 2015 Copa MX, Guadalajara, and the winners of the Clausura 2016 Copa MX, Veracruz. Like the 2015 edition, the 2016 Supercopa MX was one match at a neutral venue in the United States. This match took place at the StubHub Center in Carson, California. The 2016 Supercopa MX was part of a doubleheader, which also included the 2016 Campeón de Campeones, organized by Univision Deportes, Soccer United Marketing (SUM), and Liga MX.

Guadalajara won the match 2–0, earning a spot in the 2017 Copa Libertadores first stage as "Mexico 3".

== Match details ==
10 July 2016
15:06

Guadalajara	2–0	Veracruz
Pineda 45'; Bravo 90+4'	Report

StubHub Center, Carson
Attendance: 27,132
Referee: Alejandro Mariscal (United States)

Guadalajara	Veracruz

GK	30	(Mexico) Rodolfo Cota
DF	6	(Mexico) Edwin Hernández
DF	13	(Mexico) Carlos Salcedo (c)	(yellow card) 51'
DF	4	(Mexico) Jair Pereira	(yellow card) 71'
DF	17	(Mexico) Jesús Sánchez
MF	7	(Mexico) Orbelín Pineda		(substituted off) 84'
MF	3	(Mexico) Carlos Salcido
MF	24	(Mexico) Carlos Cisneros
MF	27	(Mexico) Carlos Peña		(substituted off) 88'
MF	11	(United States) Isaác Brizuela		(substituted off) 64'
FW	14	(Mexico) Ángel Zaldívar
Substitutions:
GK	1	(Mexico) José Antonio Rodríguez
DF	16	(United States) Miguel Ángel Ponce
MF	10	(Mexico) Javier Eduardo López		(substituted on) 64'
MF	23	(Mexico) José Juan Vázquez		(substituted on) 84'
FW	9	(Mexico) Omar Bravo	(yellow card) 90+5'	(substituted on) 88'
FW	18	(Mexico) Néstor Calderón
FW	19	(Mexico) Marco Bueno
Manager:
(Argentina) Matías Almeyda

GK	1	(Peru) Pedro Gallese
DF	14	(Mexico) Luis Sánchez
DF	19	(Argentina) Matías Cahais
DF	23	(Mexico) Leobardo López (c)
DF	28	(Mexico) Jesús Paganoni
MF	29	(Mexico) Hugo Cid		(substituted off) 75'
MF	8	(Uruguay) Gabriel Peñalba
MF	9	(Argentina) Daniel Villalva		(substituted off) 83'
MF	21	(Uruguay) Adrián Luna	(yellow card) 57'
MF	20	(Chile) Fernando Meneses		(substituted off) 61'
FW	11	(Argentina) Julio Furch
Substitutions:
GK	13	(Mexico) Melitón Hernández
DF	3	(Argentina) Lucas Rodríguez
DF	24	(Argentina) Rodrigo Noya
MF	7	(Mexico) Alan Zamora
MF	17	(United States) Sebastian Saucedo		(substituted on) 83'
MF	18	(Mexico) Édgar Andrade		(substituted on) 75'
FW	15	(Colombia) Juan Pérez	(yellow card) 66'	(substituted on) 61'
Manager:
(Argentina) Pablo Marini

Assistant referees:
Jeremy Hanson (United States)
Alexander Luttmann (United States)
Fourth official:
Timothy Ford (United States)

== See also ==
- Apertura 2015 Copa MX
- Clausura 2016 Copa MX
