= 2023–24 C.F. Monterrey season =

Monterrey
2023–24 season
- Sporting director: José Antonio Noriega
- Manager: Fernando Ortíz
- Stadium: BBVA
- Liga MX: Apertura: 2nd Clausura: 4th 2nd
- Leagues Cup: Semi-finals
- CONCACAF Champions Cup: Semi-finals
- Top goalscorer: League: Germán Berterame; Sergio Canales (11 each); All: Germán Berterame; Sergio Canales (13 each)
- Highest home attendance: 38,156 vs Atlas (9 July 2023)
- Average home league attendance: 38,156
- Biggest win: Mazatlán 0–3 Monterrey; Monterrey 3–0 Real Salt Lake
Home colours	Away colours	Third colours

The 2023–24 Monterrey season was the 78th year in the football club's history and the 66th consecutive season in the top flight of Mexican football. Monterrey competed in Liga MX, the Leagues Cup, and the CONCACAF Champions Cup.

== Kits ==
- Supplier: Puma
- Sponsors: BBVA, Codere, Roshfrans, VIDUSA (front), Tecate, OXXO, H-E-B (back), nowports, CREST México, Berel (sleeves), Futura (shorts), Viva (socks)

Home	Home alt. 1	Home alt. 2	Away	Away alt. 1	Third	Third 2022-23	Leagues Cup

== Players ==
=== Squad information ===
No.	Pos.	Nat.	Name	Age	Signed in	Previous club
1	GK	(Argentina)	Esteban Andrada	35	2021	(Argentina) Boca Juniors
4	DF	(Mexico)	Víctor Guzmán	24	2023 (Winter)	(Mexico) Tijuana
5	MF	(Mexico)	Omar Govea	30	2023 (Winter)	(Romania) Voluntari
6	DF	(Mexico)	Edson Gutiérrez	30	2018	(Mexico) Celaya
9	FW	(Argentina)	Germán Berterame	27	2022	(Mexico) Atlético San Luis
10	MF	(Spain)	Sergio Canales	35	2023	(Spain) Real Betis
11	MF	(Argentina)	Maximiliano Meza	33	2019 (Winter)	(Argentina) Independiente
14	DF	(Mexico)	Érick Aguirre	29	2021	(Mexico) Pachuca
15	DF	(Mexico)	Héctor Moreno (captain)	38	2021	(Qatar) Al-Gharafa
17	DF	(Mexico)	Jesús Gallardo	32	2018	(Mexico) Pumas UNAM
18	DF	(Mexico)	Axel Grijalva	26	2018	Youth system
19	MF	(Mexico)	Jordi Cortizo	30	2022 (Winter)	(Mexico) Puebla
20	DF	(Chile)	Sebastián Vegas	29	2021	(Mexico) Mazatlán
21	MF	(Mexico)	Alfonso González	32	2016	(Mexico) Atlas
22	GK	(Mexico)	Luis Cárdenas	33	2019 (Winter)	(Mexico) Querétaro
23	DF	(Mexico)	Gustavo Sánchez	26	2020	Youth system
24	GK	(Mexico)	César Ramos	26	2020	Youth system
25	MF	(Mexico)	Jonathan González	27	2023	(Mexico) Raya2
27	MF	(Mexico)	Luis Romo	31	2022 (Winter)	(Mexico) Cruz Azul
29	FW	(Uruguay)	Rodrigo Aguirre	32	2022	(Mexico) Necaxa
31	DF	(Mexico)	Daniel Parra	27	2023	(Mexico) Atlético Morelia
33	DF	(Colombia)	Stefan Medina	34	2017	(Mexico) Pachuca
34	DF	(Mexico)	César Bustos	21	2023	Youth system

- Last updated: 26 July 2023
- Source: ligamx.net and rayados.com

== Transfers ==
=== Transfers in ===
Summer

Date	Position	No.	Player	From	Type	Ref.
24 July 2023	MF	10	(Spain) Sergio Canales	(Spain) Real Betis	Transfer	

=== Transfers out ===
Summer

Date	Position	No.	Player	To	Type	Ref.
9 July 2023	MF	–	(Mexico) Ángel Zapata	(Mexico) FC Juárez	Loan	
24 July 2023	MF	16	(Paraguay) Celso Ortíz	(Mexico) Pachuca	Released	

== Competitions ==
=== Overview ===
Competition	First match	Last match	Starting round	Record							
Competition	First match	Last match	Starting round	Pld	W	D	L	GF	GA	GD	Win %
Apertura 2023	1 July 2023		Matchday 1	3	2	1	0	5	1	+4	66.67
Clausura 2024	January 2024		Matchday 1	0	0	0	0	0	0	+0	—
Leagues Cup	26 July 2023		Group stage	5	5	0	0	12	4	+8	100.00
CONCACAF Champions Cup	6 February 2024		Round one	4	4	0	0	10	2	+8	100.00
Total				12	11	1	0	27	7	+20	91.67

Last updated: 11 August 2023
Source: soccerway.com

=== Liga MX ===
==== Torneo Apertura ====
===== League table =====
Pos	Team	Pld	W	D	L	GF	GA	GD	Pts	Qualification
1	América (C)	17	12	4	1	37	14	+23	40	Qualification for the quarter-finals (Note: The first four places in the table will qualify for the Liguilla quarter-finals and host the second leg.)
2	Monterrey	17	10	3	4	27	15	+12	33	Qualification for the quarter-finals
3	Tigres	17	8	6	3	32	18	+14	30	Qualification for the quarter-finals
4	Pumas	17	8	4	5	27	18	+9	28	Qualification for the quarter-finals
5	Guadalajara	17	8	3	6	22	22	0	27	Qualification for the quarter-finals

Source: Liga MX
Rules for classification: 1) Points; 2) Goal difference; 3) Number of goals scored; 4) Head-to-head results between tied teams; 5) Number of goals scored away; 6) Highest relegation coefficient; 7) Fair Play points
(C) Champions

===== Results summary =====
Overall								Home						Away					
Pld	W	D	L	GF	GA	GD	Pts	W	D	L	GF	GA	GD	W	D	L	GF	GA	GD
3	2	1	0	5	1	+4	7	1	0	0	1	0	+1	1	1	0	4	1	+3

Last updated: 14 July 2023.

===== Results round by round =====
Round	1	2	3	4	5	6	7	8	9	10	11	12	13	14	15	16	17
Ground	A	H	A	H	A	H	A	H	A	H	A	H	A	H	H	A	A
Result	D	W	W	P	P												
Position	6	5	2														

Updated to match(es) played on 14 July 2023. Source: Mediotiempo.com
A = Away; H = Home; W = Win; D = Draw; L = Loss; P = Postponed

===== Matches =====
Win Draw Loss Fixtures

The league fixtures were announced on 8 June 2023.

1 July 2023 1	Atlético San Luis	1–1	Monterrey	San Luis Potosí
17:00 CDT	Domínguez (yellow card) 31'; Güémez (yellow card) 36'; Zaldívar 48' (pen.)	Referee Report	Funes Mori 39'; Govea (yellow card) 57'; Ortíz (yellow card) 65'	Stadium: Alfonso Lastras Ramírez; Attendance: 14,494; Referee: Jorge Abraham Camacho

9 July 2023 2	Monterrey	1–0	Atlas	Guadalupe, Nuevo León
19:00 CDT				Stadium: BBVA

3 March 2023 3	Mazatlán	0–3	Monterrey	Mazatlán
18:05 MST; 19:05 CST				Stadium: Mazatlán; Referee: Jesús Rafael López

TBD 4	Monterrey	Postponed	Tijuana	Guadalupe, Nuevo León
--:-- CDT				Stadium: BBVA

TBD 5	Toluca	Postponed	Monterrey	Toluca
--:-- CDT				Stadium: Nemesio Díez

27 August 2023 6	Monterrey	v	Cruz Azul	Guadalupe, Nuevo León
20:05 CDT				Stadium: BBVA

2 September 2023 7	Guadalajara	v	Monterrey	Zapopan
17:00 CDT				Stadium: Akron

16 September 2023 8	Monterrey	v	León	Guadalupe, Nuevo León
19:00 CDT				Stadium: BBVA

23 September 2023 9	Tigres UANL	v	Monterrey	San Nicolás de los Garza
21:05 CDT				Stadium: Universitario

30 September 2023 10	Monterrey	v	Santos Laguna	Guadalupe, Nuevo León
19:00 CDT				Stadium: BBVA

3 October 2023 11	Puebla	v	Monterrey	Puebla
19:00 CDT				Stadium: Cuauhtémoc

7 October 2023 12	Monterrey	v	Juárez	Guadalupe, Nuevo León
17:00 CDT				Stadium: BBVA

22 October 2023 13	Pumas UNAM	v	Monterrey	Ciudad Universitaria
12:00 CDT				Stadium: Olímpico Universitario

28 OCtober 2023 14	Monterrey	v	América	Guadalupe, Nuevo León
21:05 CDT				Stadium: BBVA

31 October 2023 15	Monterrey	v	Necaxa	Guadalupe, Nuevo León
21:05 CDT				Stadium: BBVA

4 November 2023 16	Pachuca	v	Monterrey	Pachuca
21:00 CDT				Stadium: Hidalgo

11 November 2023 17	Querétaro	v	Monterrey	Querétaro
17:00 CDT				Stadium: Corregidora

==== Torneo Clausura ====
===== League table =====
Pos	Team	Pld	W	D	L	GF	GA	GD	Pts	Qualification
1	Monterrey	17	13	1	3	35	14	+21	40	Qualification for the quarter-finals
2	América	17	9	7	1	36	21	+15	34	Qualification for the quarter-finals
3	Guadalajara	17	10	4	3	28	18	+10	34	Qualification for the quarter-finals
4	Toluca	17	9	5	3	34	19	+15	32	Qualification for the quarter-finals
5	Pachuca	17	10	1	6	32	22	+10	31	Qualification for the reclassification

Source: Liga MX
Rules for classification: 1) Points; 2) Goal difference; 3) Number of goals scored; 4) Head-to-head results between tied teams; 5) Number of goals scored away; 6) Highest relegation coefficient; 7) Fair Play points

=== CONCACAF Champions Cup ===
==== First round ====
6 February 2024 First leg	Comunicaciones (Guatemala)	1–4	(Mexico) Monterrey	Guatemala City, Guatemala
20:00 (19:00 UTC−06:00)	Mejía 29'	Report	Berterame 22'; A. González 51'; Gallardo 71'; R. Aguirre 85'	Stadium: Estadio Doroteo Guamuch Flores; Attendance: 11,118; Referee: Selvin Brown (Honduras)

15 February 2024 Second leg	Monterrey (Mexico)	3–0 (7–1 agg.)	(Guatemala) Comunicaciones	Guadalupe, Mexico
22:15 (21:15 UTC−06:00)	Moreno 10'; Corona 31'; Vázquez 79'	Report		Stadium: Estadio BBVA; Attendance: 21,307; Referee: Iván Barton (El Salvador)

==== Second round ====
7 March 2024 First leg	Cincinnati (United States)	0–1	(Mexico) Monterrey	Cincinnati, United States
19:00		Report	Vázquez 24'	Stadium: TQL Stadium; Attendance: 21,175; Referee: Selvin Brown (Honduras)

14 March 2024 Second leg	Monterrey (Mexico)	2–1 (3–1 agg.)	(United States) Cincinnati	Guadalupe, Mexico
22:15	Romo 41'; Vázquez 68'	Report	Acosta 47'	Stadium: Estadio BBVA; Attendance: 45,221; Referee: Juan Gabriel Calderón (Costa Rica)

==== Quarterfinals ====
3 April 2024 First leg	Inter Miami (United States)	1–2	(Mexico) Monterrey	Fort Lauderdale, United States
20:00	Avilés 19'	Report	Meza 69'; Rodríguez 89',	Stadium: Chase Stadium; Attendance: 22,170; Referee: Walter López

10 April 2024 Second leg	Monterrey (Mexico)	3–1 (5–2 agg.)	(United States) Inter Miami	Guadalupe, Mexico
22:30 (20:30 UTC−06:00)	Vázquez 31'; Berterame 58'; Gallardo 64'	Report	Gómez 85'	Stadium: Estadio BBVA; Attendance: 53,032; Referee: Iván Barton

==== Semifinals ====
24 April 2024 First leg	Columbus Crew (United States)	2–1	(Mexico) Monterrey	Columbus, United States
20:15 (18:15 UTC−06:00)	Hernández 25'; Russell-Rowe 73'; Mățan (yellow card) 87'	Report	Meza 58', (yellow card) 67'; Moreno (yellow card) 90+2'	Stadium: Lower.com Field; Attendance: 17,145; Referee: Oshane Nation (Jamaica)

1 May 2024 Second leg	Monterrey (Mexico)	1–3 (2–5 agg.)	(United States) Columbus Crew	Guadalupe, Mexico
20:15 (18:15 UTC−06:00)	Cheberko 11' (o.g.)		Morris 45+4'; Rossi 49'; Russell-Rowe 89'	Stadium: Estadio BBVA

=== Leagues Cup ===
==== Group stage ====
Pos	Team	Pld	W	PW	PL	L	GF	GA	GD	Pts	Qualification	MON	RSL	SEA
1	(Mexico) Monterrey	2	2	0	0	0	7	2	+5	6	Advance to knockout stage	—	3–0	4–2
2	(United States) Real Salt Lake	2	1	0	0	1	3	3	0	3	Advance to knockout stage	—	—	3–0
3	(United States) Seattle Sounders FC	2	0	0	0	2	2	7	−5	0		—	—	—

Source: Leagues Cup
Rules for classification: Tiebreakers

26 July 2023 2	Monterrey (Mexico)	3–0	(United States) Real Salt Lake	Sandy, United States
19:30 UTC-6; 20:30 CDT	Glad 8' (o.g.); Berterame 13', 74'; Govea (yellow card) 33'; Romo (yellow card) 87'	Report	Ojeda (yellow card) 66'	Stadium: America First Field; Attendance: 20,734; Referee: Rosendo Mendoza (United States)

30 July 2023 3	Monterrey (Mexico)	4–2	(United States) Seattle Sounders FC	Seattle, United States
18:00 UTC-7; 19:00 CDT	Moreno (yellow card) 1'; Berterame 31', 45+2' (pen.), 63'; Cortizo 48'	Report	Lodeiro 2'; Morris 6'; Lodeiro (yellow card) 37'; Ragen (yellow card) 72'; Yeimar (red card) 86'	Stadium: Lumen Field; Attendance: 33,508; Referee: Bryan López

==== Knockout ====
4 August 2023 Round of 32	Monterrey (Mexico)	1–0	(United States) Portland Timbers	Portland, United States
19:00 UTC-7; 20:00 CDT	Gallardo (yellow card) 27'; Rojas (yellow card) 39'; Meza 45+1'; Meza (yellow card) 79'; Romo (yellow card) 90+6'	Report	Mosquera (yellow card) 28'; Zuparic (yellow card) 80'; Chará (yellow card) 90+6'	Stadium: Providence Park; Attendance: 18,770; Referee: Guillermo Pacheco Larios

8 August 2023 Round of 16	UANL (Mexico)	0–1	(Mexico) Monterrey	Houston, United States
19:00 UTC-5; 18:00 CDT	Samir (yellow card) 10'; Lainez (yellow card) 66'; Ordóñez (yellow card) 88'; Pizarro (yellow card) 90+3'; Aquino (yellow card) 90+6' (yellow-red card) 90+9'; Gorriarán (yellow card) 90+13'	Report	Rojas (yellow card) 44'; Romo (yellow card) 60'; Mori (yellow card) 71'; Medina (yellow card) 83'; Canales 90+7' (pen.)	Stadium: Shell Energy Stadium; Attendance: 20,104; Referee: Ismail Elfath

11 August 2023 Quarterfinals	Los Angeles FC (United States)	2–3	(Mexico) Monterrey	Pasadena, United States
20:00 UTC-7; 21:00 CDT	Bouanga 2' (pen.); Acosta (yellow card) 8'; Bogusz 42'; Murillo (yellow card) 90+3'	Report	Meza (yellow card) 25'; Medina (yellow card) 31'; Aguirre (yellow card) 56'; Canales 68' (pen.); Palencia 80' (o.g.); Funes Mori 88'; Cortizo (yellow card) 90+8'	Stadium: Rose Bowl; Attendance: 15,649; Referee: Héctor Said Martínez
Note: Due to a scheduled concert at BMO Stadium, Los Angeles FC will host their quarterfinal match at the Rose Bowl.

15 August 2023 Semifinals	Monterrey (Mexico)	0–2	(United States) Nashville SC	Nashville, United States
21:30 UTC-5; 21:30 CDT	Guzmán (yellow card) 71'; Cortizo (yellow card) 81'; Meza (yellow card) 87'	Report	Picault (yellow card) 45', (goal) 90+6'; Surridge 67'; Panicco (yellow card) 83'	Stadium: GEODIS Park; Attendance: 27,732; Referee: Walter López

19 August 2023 Third Place	Philadelphia Union (United States)	3–0	(Mexico) Monterrey	Chester, United States
18:00 UTC-4; 17:00 CDT	Bueno 1'; Uhre 45+2'; Bedoya 69'	Report	Parra (yellow card) 9'	Stadium: Subaru Park; Attendance: 19,778; Referee: Juan Calderón

== Squad statistics ==
=== Appearances and goals ===
Players with no appearances are not included on the list.

As of matches played 11 August 2023

No.	Pos	Nat	Player	Total		Apertura 2023		Clausura 2024		Leagues Cup	
No.	Pos	Nat	Player	Apps	Goals	Apps	Goals	Apps	Goals	Apps	Goals
Goalkeepers
1	GK	(Argentina) ARG	Esteban Andrada	8	0	3	0	0	0	5	0
Defenders
4	DF	(Mexico) MEX	Víctor Guzmán	3	0	0	0	0	0	2+1	0
6	DF	(Mexico) MEX	Edson Gutiérrez	1	0	0	0	0	0	0+1	0
14	DF	(Mexico) MEX	Érick Aguirre	7	0	3	0	0	0	4	0
15	DF	(Mexico) MEX	Héctor Moreno	8	0	3	0	0	0	5	0
17	DF	(Mexico) MEX	Jesús Gallardo	5	0	0	0	0	0	3+2	0
20	DF	(Chile) CHI	Sebastián Vegas	7	0	3	0	0	0	2+2	0
33	DF	(Colombia) COL	Stefan Medina	7	1	3	1	0	0	4	0
Midfielders
5	MF	(Mexico) MEX	Omar Govea	8	0	1+2	0	0	0	5	0
8	MF	(Ecuador) ECU	Joao Rojas	8	2	0+3	2	0	0	5	0
10	MF	(Spain) ESP	Sergio Canales	3	2	0	0	0	0	2+1	2
11	MF	(Argentina) ARG	Maximiliano Meza	8	1	3	0	0	0	5	1
19	MF	(Mexico) MEX	Jordi Cortizo	8	1	3	0	0	0	1+4	1
25	MF	(Mexico) MEX	Jonathan González	7	0	2+1	0	0	0	3+1	0
27	MF	(Mexico) MEX	Luis Romo	4	0	0	0	0	0	2+2	0
188	MF	(Mexico) MEX	Kevin Ortega (Note: Player is registered with the under-23 team.)	2	0	0+1	0	0	0	0+1	0
210	MF	(Mexico) MEX	Victor López	4	0	0+3	0	0	0	0+1	0
Forwards
7	FW	(Mexico) MEX	Rogelio Funes Mori	8	2	3	1	0	0	3+2	1
9	FW	(Argentina) ARG	Germán Berterame	6	6	3	1	0	0	3	5
29	FW	(Uruguay) URU	Rodrigo Aguirre	4	0	0+3	0	0	0	1	0
207	FW	(Mexico) MEX	Ali Ávila	3	0	0	0	0	0	0+3	0
Players transferred out during the season
16	DF	(Paraguay) PAR	Celso Ortíz	3	0	3	0	0	0	0	0

Source: Competitions

=== Goalscorers ===
Includes all competitive matches.

As of matches played 11 August 2023

Rank	Pos.	No.	Player	Liga Apertura	Liga Clausura	Leagues Cup	Total
1	FW	9	(Argentina) Germán Berterame	1	0	5	6
2	MF	8	(Ecuador) Joao Rojas	2	0	0	2
2	MF	10	(Spain) Sergio Canales	0	0	2	2
2	FW	7	(Mexico) Rogelio Funes Mori	1	0	1	2
5	DF	33	(Colombia) Stefan Medina	1	0	0	1
5	MF	19	(Mexico) Jordi Cortizo	1	0	1	1
5	MF	11	(Argentina) Maximiliano Meza	0	0	1	1
Own Goals				0	0	2	2
Total				5	0	12	17

Sources: Soccerway, Liga MX
