= Héctor Moreno =

Mexican footballer (born 1988)

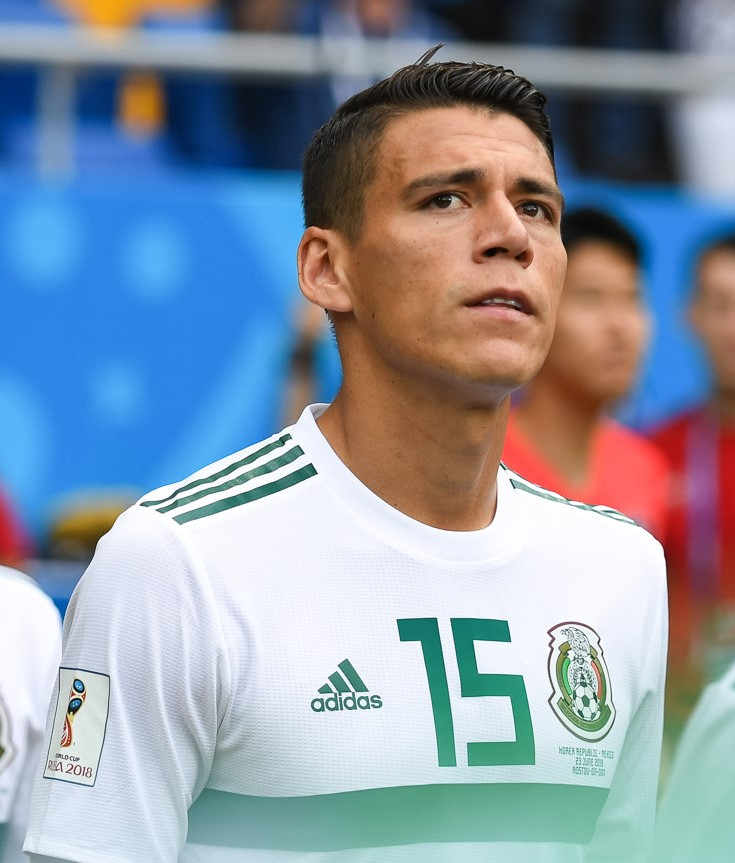
- Moreno with Mexico at the 2018 FIFA World Cup

Personal information
- Full name: Héctor Alfredo Moreno Herrera
- Date of birth: 17 January 1988 (age 38)
- Place of birth: Culiacán, Sinaloa, Mexico
- Height: 1.86 m (6 ft 1 in)
- Position: Centre-back

Youth career
- 2003–2006: UNAM

Senior career*
Years	Team	Apps	(Gls)
2006–2007	UNAM	44	(2)
2008–2011	AZ	80	(6)
2011–2015	Espanyol	118	(7)
2015–2017	PSV	61	(11)
2017–2018	Roma	5	(0)
2018–2019	Real Sociedad	33	(2)
2019–2021	Al-Gharafa	34	(1)
2021–2025	Monterrey	112	(1)

International career^{‡}
2005	Mexico U17	6	(2)
2007	Mexico U20	4	(1)
2007–2023	Mexico	132	(5)
Medal record
Representing Mexico
Winner	FIFA U-17 World Championship	2005
Winner	CONCACAF Gold Cup	2011
Winner	CONCACAF Gold Cup	2019
Runner-up	CONCACAF Gold Cup	2021
- * Club domestic league appearances and goals as of 09:25, 13 November 2025 (UTC) ‡ National team caps and goals as of 26 March 2023

Héctor Alfredo Moreno Herrera (born 17 January 1988) is a Mexican former professional footballer who played as a centre-back.

Moreno progressed through the youth ranks of Universidad Nacional, making his senior debut in 2006 at the age of 18. In 2007, he transferred to Dutch club AZ Alkmaar, where he won the Eredivisie title. He joined Spanish side Espanyol in 2011 and remained with the team for four seasons before returning to the Netherlands with PSV Eindhoven. Subsequent moves included Roma in Italy, Real Sociedad in Spain, and Al-Gharafa in Qatar. Moreno later returned to Mexico to play for Monterrey, retiring after four years with the club.

Moreno was a member of the Mexico national under-17 team that won the 2005 World Championship held in Peru. He has also represented Mexico at the 2010, 2014, 2018, and 2022 FIFA World Cup, as well as the 2011 and 2019 CONCACAF Gold Cup, the Copa América Centenario, and the 2013 and 2017 FIFA Confederations Cup.

== Club career ==
=== Club Universidad Nacional ===
Héctor Moreno joined Club Universidad Nacional's youth system in 2003 at age 15, and made his way into the first team after winning the FIFA U-17 World Championship with Mexico in 2005.

Moreno made his professional debut during the Clausura 2006 tournament, coming on as an 88th-minute substitute for Gerardo Galindo in the 1–0 victory over Santos Laguna on 22 January. He played his first full 90 minutes on 12 February in a 2–0 win over Veracruz, and scored his first goal the following week in a 1–3 defeat to Cruz Azul. Moreno would end the Clausura making six appearances in total. He would eventually secure his position as a regular starter.

For the Apertura 2007, Moreno would play in his first, and only, league final with UNAM, losing to Atlante 2–1 on aggregate.

=== AZ ===
On 13 December 2007, it was announced Moreno was transferred to Dutch club AZ in a US$4.5 million deal. He made his Eredivisie debut on 1 March 2008 in a 1–1 draw against Roda JC, playing the full 90 minutes. In April 2009, Moreno won his first Eredivisie title with AZ. On 22 April, it was reported Moreno had signed a contract extension with AZ which would tie him to the club until 2014.

On 25 July, AZ won the Johan Cruyff Shield after defeating Heerenveen 5–1 in the final. Moreno made his debut in the UEFA Champions League on 16 September in a 0–1 defeat to Olympiacos. On 7 February 2010, Moreno gave Alkmaar a 2–1 victory over Feyenoord by scoring a header from a corner-kick in the 87th minute. He scored his third goal of the season in a 6–2 victory over RKC Waalwijk on 13 March 2010. He would score his fourth goal in a 3–0 victory over Willem II on 18 April.

=== Espanyol ===
On 22 June 2011, it was announced Moreno would transfer to Spanish La Liga club Espanyol on a five-year contract for an undisclosed fee. On 28 August, he made his debut in La Liga against Mallorca. On 26 September, he scored his first goal in a 1–3 loss to Levante. On 3 December, he would score his second league goal in a 1–2 loss to Valencia. Moreno scored his third goal of the season in a 3–1 home win against Racing de Santander.

On 4 October 2012, Moreno was named Espanyol's Player of the Year for the 2011–12 season, his debut season, playing 35 league matches (for a total of 3,295 minutes played) and scoring three goals with one assist.

Prior to the start of the 2014–15 season, it was announced Moreno would be out of action for up to six months due to a broken left tibia he suffered while playing for Mexico at the 2014 FIFA World Cup, which would require surgery and rehabilitation. It was rumoured the injury prevented him from signing for Manchester United during the summer transfer window. Moreno made his return after four months on 14 November in a friendly against Marseille, replacing Felipe Caicedo in the 68th minute in an eventual 2–1 win.

Moreno made his official return with Espanyol on 2 December, coming off the bench to replace Álvaro in the 73rd minute in the 2–0 victory over Alavés in the first leg of the round of 32 of the Copa del Rey.

=== PSV ===
On 15 August 2015, PSV Eindhoven announced the signing of Moreno. Upon his return to the Eredivisie, Moreno signed a four-year contract for €5 million with the club.

Moreno was handed a starting berth on his debut and played all 90 minutes in the 6–0 win over Cambuur on 12 September. Three days later, during PSV's opening 2015–16 UEFA Champions League match against Manchester United, Moreno broke the leg of Luke Shaw as the result of a two-footed challenge. He was not sanctioned for the tackle on Shaw, and Moreno went on to score the 47th-minute equaliser for PSV as they defeated Manchester United 2–1 in the match. He was later named UEFA Man of the Match.

On 17 January 2016, Moreno scored in PSV's 2–0 win over Feyenoord. A week later, he scored his first double as PSV defeated Twente 4–2 with assists provided by fellow Mexico national teammate, Andrés Guardado.

On 8 May, Moreno played all 90 minutes in PSV's defeat of PEC Zwolle 3–1 on the final matchday to be crowned 2015–16 Eredivisie champions.

On 31 July, PSV won the 2016 Johan Cruyff Shield but Moreno was not present on the field or bench.

The following season, Moreno played in 39 matches across all competitions, and scored seven goals, a career-high tally, though PSV failed to defend the league as they finished in third place.

=== Roma ===
On 13 June 2017, Moreno joined Italian side Roma on a four-year contract. He made his Serie A debut on 16 September in Roma's 3–0 win over Hellas Verona, replacing Kostas Manolas in the 73rd minute.

=== Real Sociedad ===
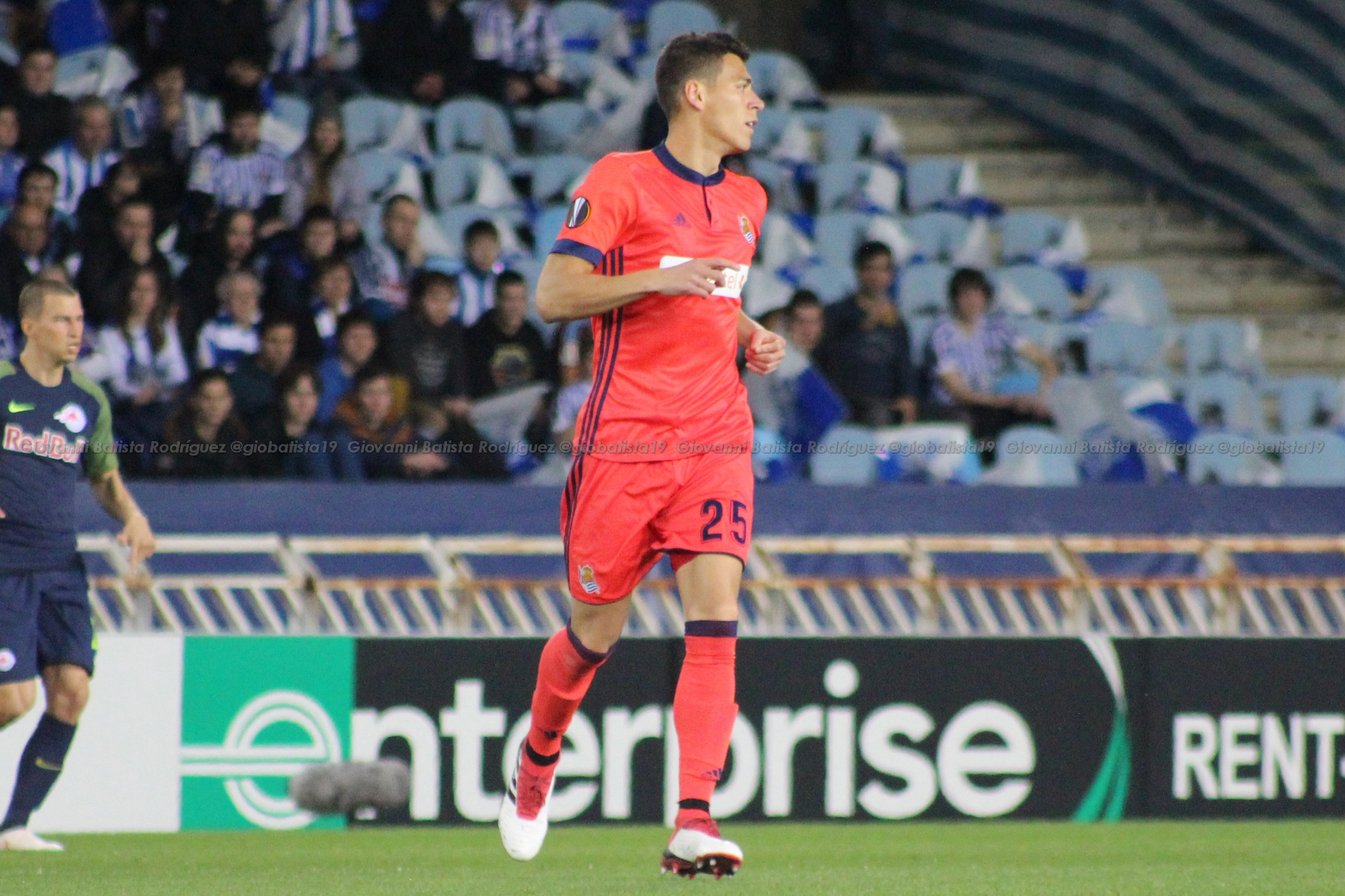
Moreno playing with Real Sociedad in 2018

On 31 January 2018, Spanish club Real Sociedad announced the transfer of Moreno from Roma for €6 million, signing with the club until 2021. On 15 February, he made his competitive debut for La Real against Red Bull Salzburg in the Europa League, playing 76 minutes in the team's 2–2 draw. During midweek training, however, Moreno suffered a grade 1 injury to his internal obturator, meaning he would be ruled out for an undisclosed period of time. He returned and made his debut in La Liga with Real Sociedad on 1 March in a scoreless draw against Real Betis. Three days later, he scored his first goal against Deportivo Alavés, giving his team the lead at the 6th minute, in an eventual 2–1 victory.

=== Al-Gharafa ===
He transferred to Al-Gharafa in July 2019, making him the first Mexican international player to play in Qatar Stars League. He made his debut the following month on 22 August in a 3–0 victory over Al-Shahania. On 9 November, he would score his first goal for the team in a 2–0 victory over Umm Salal SC.

=== Monterrey ===
On 7 June 2021, Moreno joined Monterrey as free agent. In October 2021, Monterrey won the 2021 CONCACAF Champions League, defeating América in the final. In December 2022, following the departure of captain César Montes, Moreno was named captain for the 2023 Clausura.

On 17 October 2025, Moreno announced his retirement from professional football. He played his last match on 6 December.

== International career ==
=== Youth ===
Moreno was called up to participate at the 2005 FIFA U-17 World Cup in Peru. Mexico would go on to win the tournament, beating Brazil in the final 3–0.

Moreno participated at the 2006 Toulon Tournament, where Mexico finished third in the group stage.

During Mexico's first match at the 2007 FIFA U-20 World Cup against Gambia, Moreno played as a defensive midfielder and scored Mexico's third goal in a 3–0 victory. Mexico would win their group but would be eliminated in the quarter-finals by Argentina.

=== Senior ===
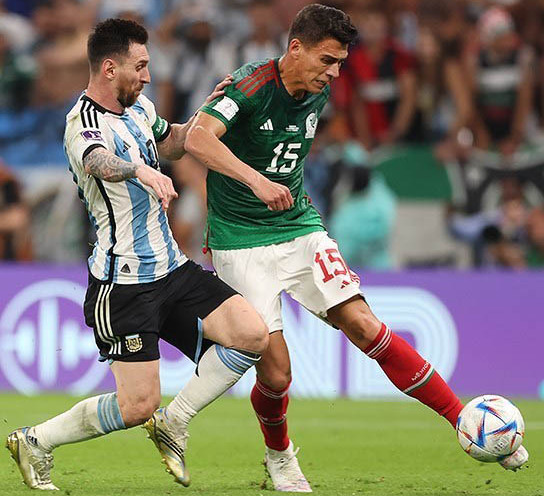
Moreno disputing the ball against Argentina's Lionel Messi at the 2022 World Cup

Moreno made his senior national team debut on 17 October 2007 under Hugo Sánchez in a friendly against Guatemala.

Moreno was included by Javier Aguirre to be a part of the 23-man squad that would participate in the 2010 FIFA World Cup. He made his debut in the Group A match against France on 17 June, which Mexico won 2–0. Moreno would also start against Uruguay.

Moreno was called up by José Manuel de la Torre to be part of the national team that won the 2011 CONCACAF Gold Cup. He played in all of Mexico's matches, as well as the final against the United States, which Mexico won 4–2.

On 12 June 2012, Moreno scored the winning goal for Mexico in a 2–1 game over El Salvador in a 2014 World Cup qualifying match, the first of his career.

He was called up for the 2013 FIFA Confederations Cup. He appeared in every match as Mexico finished 3rd in the group stage.

On 5 June 2014, national team coach Miguel Herrera named Moreno in the final 23-man squad for the 2014 World Cup. On 29 June, in the round of 16 match against the Netherlands, Moreno suffered a fractured tibia after a collision with Dutch striker Arjen Robben inside his own penalty area. Moreno was stretchered off the field a few minutes before half-time and was substituted by Diego Reyes. It was later reported Moreno was expected to be ruled out of action for up to six months.

On 27 June 2015, during Mexico's friendly match against Costa Rica, Moreno was substituted off at half-time after complaining of pain. On 1 July, the Mexican Football Federation announced Moreno would be ruled out of the upcoming 2015 CONCACAF Gold Cup tournament after a successful surgery on his right foot, which stemmed from complications related to a procedure he underwent six years prior following an injury to his fifth metatarsal. He was replaced in the squad by Oswaldo Alanís. As Mexico won the tournament, he was called up by interim manager Ricardo Ferretti to participate in the subsequent CONCACAF Cup – a play-off match to determine CONCACAF's entry into the 2017 FIFA Confederations Cup – against the United States. Mexico won the match 3–2 during overtime.

In May 2016, he was called up for the Copa América Centenario by Juan Carlos Osorio.

He was called up for the 2017 FIFA Confederations Cup. He would score the late equalizer in the 2–2 group-stage draw against Portugal. He would go on to appear all five matches of the tournament.

In May 2018, Moreno was named in Mexico's preliminary 28-man squad for the World Cup, and in June, was ultimately included in the final 23-man roster. He would appear in all group stage matches but accumulated two yellow cards during the group stage, making him miss out on the round-of-16 0–2 loss against Brazil.

On 6 June 2019, Moreno was called up by coach Gerardo Martino to participate in the CONCACAF Gold Cup. Three days later, in a warm-up match against Ecuador, he would pick up an injury following a clearance. He would return to the field on 29 June in the quarter-final match against Costa Rica, coming in as an overtime substitute at the 106th minute and managing to score in the penalty shoot-out. On 2 July, Moreno played his 100th match with Mexico against Haiti, in a 1–0 win in the semi-finals of the Gold Cup. The team would go on to win the tournament, defeating the United States 1–0 in the final.

As Tri captain Andrés Guardado withdrew from the 2021 Gold Cup roster due to injury, Moreno was expected to wear the captain armband, but did not appear until the final group stage match due to being unfit. In the final against the United States, Moreno withdrew during the first half of the match due to injury, being replaced by Carlos Salcedo. Mexico lost the match 1–0.

In October 2022, Moreno was named in Mexico's preliminary 31-man squad for the World Cup, and in November, was ultimately included in the final 26-man roster.

== Style of play ==
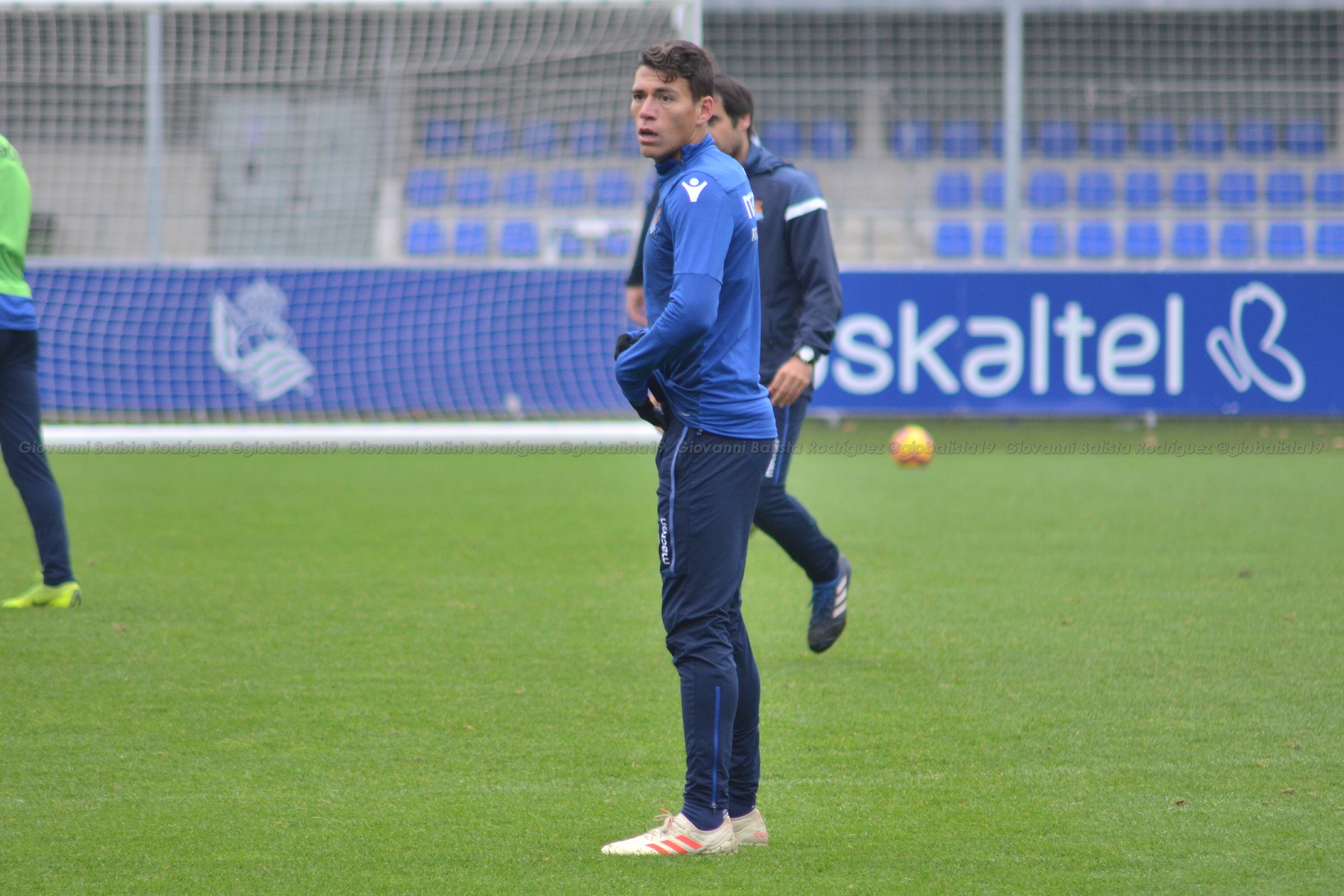
Moreno training with Real Sociedad in 2018

Moreno is a left-footed defender who is capable of starting attacks from the back and "with excellent passing that characterizes the modern center back". Writing for Bleacher Report, Allan Jiang described him as being able to "read and quickly react in adverse situations", as well as having positional awareness. He described Moreno's playing style as retaining the dominant defensive position, jockeying and forcing the opposing player into a mistake.

== Personal life ==
In January 2021, Moreno signed a sponsorship deal with Mexican sports brand, Charly.

== Career statistics ==
=== Club ===
As of match played 16 May 2024

Appearances and goals by club, season and competition
Club	Season	League			National cup (Note: Includes KNVB Cup, Copa del Rey, Coppa Italia, Emir of Qatar Cup)		Continental		Other		Total	
Club	Season	Division	Apps	Goals	Apps	Goals	Apps	Goals	Apps	Goals	Apps	Goals
UNAM	2005–06	Primera División	6	1	—		4	0	—		10	1
UNAM	2006–07	Primera División	16	0	—		—		—		16	0
UNAM	2007–08	Primera División	22	1	—		—		—		22	1
UNAM	Total		44	2	—		4	0	—		48	2
AZ	2007–08	Eredivisie	8	1	—		—		—		8	1
AZ	2008–09	Eredivisie	15	0	1	1	—		—		16	1
AZ	2009–10	Eredivisie	30	4	1	0	6 (Note: Appearances in UEFA Champions League)	0	1 (Note: Appearance in Johan Cruyff Shield)	0	38	4
AZ	2010–11	Eredivisie	27	1	—		8 (Note: Appearances in UEFA Europa League)	0	—		35	1
AZ	Total		80	6	2	1	14	0	1	0	97	7
Espanyol	2011–12	La Liga	35	3	5	0	—		—		40	3
Espanyol	2012–13	La Liga	32	2	1	0	—		—		33	2
Espanyol	2013–14	La Liga	32	1	5	0	—		—		37	1
Espanyol	2014–15	La Liga	19	1	7	0	—		—		26	1
Espanyol	Total		118	7	18	0	—		—		136	7
PSV	2015–16	Eredivisie	29	4	4	1	8	1	—		41	6
PSV	2016–17	Eredivisie	32	7	1	0	6	0	—		39	7
PSV	Total		61	11	5	1	14	1	—		80	13
Roma	2017–18	Serie A	5	0	1	0	—		—		6	0
Real Sociedad	2017–18	La Liga	8	1	—		1	0	—		9	1
Real Sociedad	2018–19	La Liga	25	1	4	0	—		—		29	1
Real Sociedad	Total		33	2	4	0	1	0	—		38	2
Al-Gharafa	2019–20	Qatar Stars League	21	1	1	0	—		—		22	1
Al-Gharafa	2020–21	Qatar Stars League	13	0	1	0	1	0	—		15	0
Al-Gharafa	Total		34	1	2	0	1	0	—		37	1
Monterrey	2020–21	Liga MX	—		—		2	0	—		2	0
Monterrey	2021–22	Liga MX	23	0	—		—		2 (Note: Appearances in Leagues Cup)	0	25	0
Monterrey	2022–23	Liga MX	36	1	—		—		—		36	1
Monterrey	2023–24	Liga MX	23	0	—		7 (Note: Appearances in CONCACAF Champions Cup)	1	6	0	36	1
Monterrey	2024–25	Liga MX	0	0	—		0	0	—		0	0
Monterrey	Total		82	1	—		9	1	8	0	99	2
Career total			457	30	33	2	43	2	9	0	542	34

=== International ===
As of match played 26 March 2023

Appearances and goals by national team and year
National team	Year	Apps	Goals
Mexico	2007	1	0
Mexico	2008	1	0
Mexico	2009	1	0
Mexico	2010	11	0
Mexico	2011	14	0
Mexico	2012	9	1
Mexico	2013	11	0
Mexico	2014	8	0
Mexico	2015	7	0
Mexico	2016	10	1
Mexico	2017	15	1
Mexico	2018	6	0
Mexico	2019	9	1
Mexico	2020	4	0
Mexico	2021	11	1
Mexico	2022	12	0
Mexico	2023	1	0
Total		132	5

Scores and results list Mexico's goal tally first, score column indicates score after each Moreno goal.

List of international goals scored by Héctor Moreno
No.	Date	Venue	Opponent	Score	Result	Competition
1	12 June 2012	Estadio Cuscatlán, San Salvador, El Salvador	El Salvador	2–1	2–1	2014 FIFA World Cup qualification
2	2 September 2016	Estadio Cuscatlán, San Salvador, El Salvador	El Salvador	1–1	3–1	2018 FIFA World Cup qualification
3	18 June 2017	Kazan Arena, Kazan, Russia	Portugal	2–2	2–2	2017 FIFA Confederations Cup
4	22 March 2019	SDCCU Stadium, San Diego, United States	Chile	2–0	3–1	Friendly
5	13 October 2021	Estadio Cuscatlán, San Salvador, El Salvador	El Salvador	1–0	2–0	2022 FIFA World Cup qualification

== Honours ==
AZ

- Eredivisie: 2008–09
- Johan Cruyff Shield: 2009

PSV

- Eredivisie: 2015–16
- Johan Cruyff Shield: 2016

Monterrey

- CONCACAF Champions League: 2021

Mexico U17

- FIFA U-17 World Championship: 2005

Mexico

- CONCACAF Gold Cup: 2011, 2019
- CONCACAF Cup: 2015

Individual

- Espanyol Player of the Year: 2011–12
- CONCACAF Best XI: 2015, 2017, 2021
- AD Eredivisie Best XI: 2015–16
- IFFHS CONCACAF Men's Team of the Decade: 2011–2020

== See also ==
- List of footballers with 100 or more caps
