= Joao Rojas =

Joao Rojas may refer to:

- Joao Rojas (footballer, born 1989), Ecuadorian football winger for Asociación Deportiva Tarma
- Joao Rojas (footballer, born 1997), Ecuadorian football winger for Barcelona SC
