= Edson Gutiérrez =

Mexican footballer (born 1996)

Personal information
- Full name: Edson Antonio Gutiérrez Moreno
- Date of birth: 19 January 1996 (age 30)
- Place of birth: Salamanca, Guanajuato, Mexico
- Height: 1.76 m (5 ft 9 in)
- Position: Right-back

Team information
- Current team: Sinaloa
- Number: 26

Senior career*
Years	Team	Apps	(Gls)
2012–2018	Celaya	118	(5)
2016–2017	→ Irapuato (loan)	32	(1)
2018–2025	Monterrey	57	(1)
2025	Santos Laguna	8	(0)
2026–	Sinaloa	0	(0)
- * Club domestic league appearances and goals as of 30 March 2025

Edson Antonio Gutiérrez Moreno (born 19 January 1996) is a Mexican professional footballer who plays as a right-back for Liga de Expansión MX club Sinaloa.

== Career statistics ==
=== Club ===
As of 21 February 2024

Club	Season	League			Cup		Continental		Other		Total	
Club	Season	Division	Apps	Goals	Apps	Goals	Apps	Goals	Apps	Goals	Apps	Goals
Monterrey	2017–18	Liga MX	–		–		–		1 (Note: Appearance in Supercopa MX)	0	1	0
Monterrey	2018–19	Liga MX	12	0	5	0	–		–		17	0
Monterrey	2019–20	Liga MX	5	0	10	0	–		1 (Note: Appearance in FIFA Club World Cup)	0	16	0
Monterrey	2020–21	Liga MX	5	0	–		2 (Note: Appearances in CONCACAF Champions Cup)	0	—		7	0
Monterrey	2021–22	Liga MX	9	0	–		—		–		9	0
Monterrey	2022–23	Liga MX	10	0	–		—		–		10	0
Monterrey	2023–24	Liga MX	8	0	–		4	0	2 (Note: Appearances in Leagues Cup)	0	12	0
Monterrey	2024–25	Liga MX	0	0	–		—		–		0	0
Monterrey	Total		49	0	15	0	6	0	4	0	74	0
Career total			49	0	15	0	6	0	4	0	74	0

== Honours ==
Monterrey

- Liga MX: Apertura 2019
- Copa MX: 2019–20
- CONCACAF Champions League: 2019, 2021
