= Gustavo Sánchez (footballer) =

Mexican footballer (born 2000)

Personal information
- Full name: Luis Gustavo Sánchez Saucedo
- Date of birth: 3 May 2000 (age 26)
- Place of birth: Tantoyuca, Veracruz, Mexico
- Height: 1.82 m (6 ft 0 in)
- Position: Centre-back

Team information
- Current team: Atlante
- Number: 3

Youth career
- 2018–2021: Monterrey

Senior career*
Years	Team	Apps	(Gls)
2020–2026	Monterrey	6	(0)
2021–2023	→ Raya2 (loan)	32	(2)
2023	→ Pachuca (loan)	1	(0)
2024–2025	→ Mazatlán (loan)	32	(2)
2026–	Atlante	5	(0)
- * Club domestic league appearances and goals as of 20 November 2026

Luis Gustavo Sánchez Saucedo (born 3 May 2000) is a Mexican professional footballer who plays as a centre-back for Liga MX club Monterrey.

== Career statistics ==
=== Club ===
As of match played on 20 November 2026

Club	Season	League			Cup		Continental		Other		Total	
Club	Season	Division	Apps	Goals	Apps	Goals	Apps	Goals	Apps	Goals	Apps	Goals
Monterrey	2020–21	Liga MX	3	0	—		2 (Note: Appearances in CONCACAF Champions League)	1	—		5	1
Monterrey	2021–22	Liga MX	1	0	—		—		—		1	0
Monterrey	2022–23	Liga MX	2	0	—		—		—		2	0
Monterrey	2025–26	Liga MX	—		—		—		1 (Note: Appearances in Leagues Cup)	0	1	0
Monterrey	Total		6	0	—		2	1	1	0	9	1
Raya2 (loan)	2021–22	Liga de Expansión MX	19	1	—		—		—		19	1
Raya2 (loan)	2022–23	Liga de Expansión MX	13	1	—		—		—		13	1
Raya2 (loan)	Total		32	2	—		—		—		32	2
Pachuca (loan)	2023–24	Liga MX	1	0	—		—		—		1	0
Mazatlán (loan)	2023–24	Liga MX	6	0	—		—		—		6	0
Mazatlán (loan)	2024–25	Liga MX	26	2	—		—		5	0	31	2
Mazatlán (loan)	Total		32	2	—		—		5	0	37	2
Atlante	2026–27	Liga MX	5	0	—		—		1	0	6	0
Career total			76	4	0	0	2	1	7	0	85	5

== Honours ==
Monterrey

- CONCACAF Champions League: 2021
