= Axel Grijalva =

Mexican footballer (born 2000)

Personal information
- Full name: Axel Said Grijalva Soto
- Date of birth: 26 July 2000 (age 26)
- Place of birth: Sinaloa de Leyva, Mexico
- Height: 1.77 m (5 ft 10 in)
- Position: Defender

Team information
- Current team: Venados
- Number: 4

Youth career
- 2013–2024: Monterrey

Senior career*
Years	Team	Apps	(Gls)
2018–2024	Monterrey	4	(0)
2021–2023	→ Raya2 (loan)	27	(0)
2025–	Venados	32	(3)
- * Club domestic league appearances and goals as of 7 September 2026

Axel Said Grijalva Soto (born 26 July 2000) is a Mexican professional footballer who plays as a defender for Liga de Expansión MX club Venados.

== Career statistics ==
=== Club ===
As of 20 May 2023

Club	Season	League			Cup		Continental		Other		Total	
Club	Season	Division	Apps	Goals	Apps	Goals	Apps	Goals	Apps	Goals	Apps	Goals
Monterrey	2018–19	Liga MX	1	0	2 (Note: Appearances in Copa MX)	0	–		–		3	0
Monterrey	2019–20	Liga MX	–		4	0	–		–		4	0
Monterrey	2020–21	Liga MX	–		–		1 (Note: Appearance in CONCACAF Champions League)	0	–		1	0
Monterrey	2021–22	Liga MX	1	0	–		–		–		1	0
Monterrey	2022–23	Liga MX	2	0	–		–		–		2	0
Monterrey	Total		4	0	6	0	1	0	0	0	11	0
Raya2 (loan)	2021–22	Liga de Expansión MX	15	0	—		—		—		15	0
Raya2 (loan)	2022–23	Liga de Expansión MX	12	0	–		–		–		12	0
Raya2 (loan)	Total		27	0	—		—		—		27	0
Career total			31	0	6	0	1	0	0	0	38	0

== Honours ==
Monterrey

- CONCACAF Champions League: 2021
