= Daniel Parra =

Mexican footballer (born 1999)

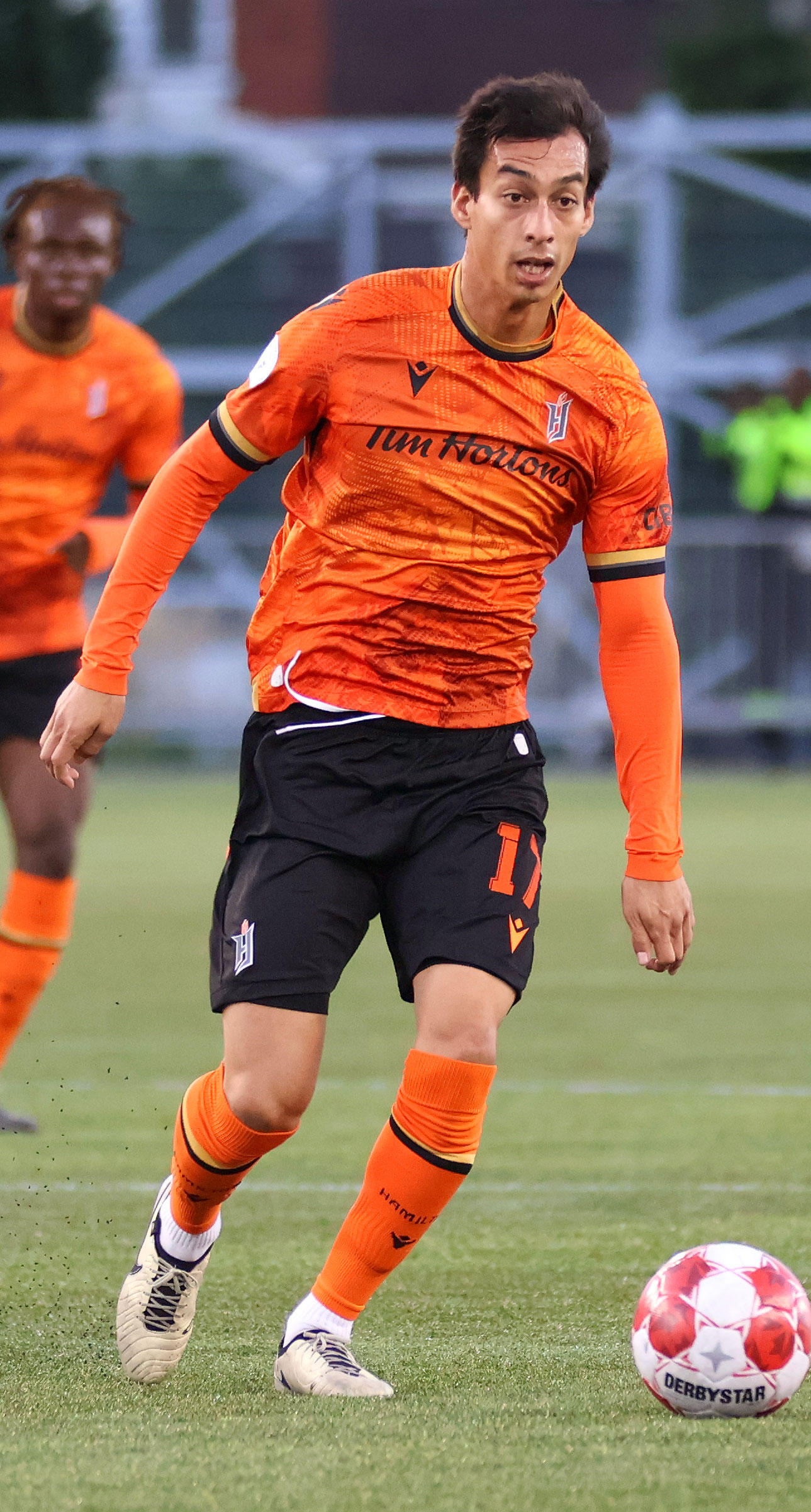
- Parra with Forge FC in 2024

Personal information
- Full name: Daniel Alexis Parra Durán
- Date of birth: 20 July 1999 (age 27)
- Place of birth: Celaya, Guanajuato, Mexico
- Height: 1.76 m (5 ft 9 1/2 in)
- Position: Left-back

Team information
- Current team: Querétaro (on loan from Atlético Morelia)
- Number: 27

Youth career
- 2012–2014: Pachuca
- 2014–2020: Monterrey

Senior career*
Years	Team	Apps	(Gls)
2016–2025	Monterrey	21	(1)
2021–2022	→ Raya2 (loan)	5	(0)
2022	→ Necaxa (loan)	5	(0)
2023	→ Atlético Morelia (loan)	21	(4)
2024	→ Forge FC (loan)	25	(2)
2025–	Atlético Morelia	27	(2)
2026–	→ Querétaro (loan)	29	(1)
- * Club domestic league appearances and goals as of 14 November 2026

Daniel Alexis Parra Durán (born 20 July 1999) is a Mexican professional footballer who plays as a left-back for Querétaro in Liga MX, on loan from Atlético Morelia in the Liga de Expansión MX.

== Early life ==
Parra began playing football with the youth system of Pachuca. In 2014, he joined the youth system of Monterrey.

== Club career ==
On 14 August 2016, Parra made his debut for Monterrey, in a CONCACAF Champions League match against Don Bosco. On 14 August 2016, he made his Liga MX debut coming on as a substitute in the 89th minute for Celso Ortiz in the 2–1 victory against Necaxa.

In 2019, he began his first full senior season, however, his progress was interrupted by knee injuries to both knees, that kept him out of action for a year and a half, prompting the club to pursue loan options upon his return.

In 2021, he played with the second team, Raya2 Expansión, in the second tier Liga de Expansión MX. In May 2022, he went on loan with Necaxa in Liga MX. In November 2022, he joined Atlético Morelia in the second tier Liga de Expansión MX on loan.

In June 2023, he departed the club to return to Monterrey, after having finished as the team's leading scorer with four goals, despite playing as a fullback.

In March 2024, he went on full-year loan with Forge FC of the Canadian Premier League, with an option to extend it for an additional year. He made his debut for Forge on 13 April 2024, against Cavalry FC. After the season, Forge announced that they would trigger his loan option to extend for 2025, however, Parra instead sought a move to a new Mexican club.

In February 2025, he signed with his former loan club Atlético Morelia in the Liga de Expansión MX on a permanent basis.

In December 2025, he joined Querétaro on a one-year loan for 2026, with an option to buy.

== International career ==
In September 2014, Parra was called up to a camp with the Mexico U17 team.

== Career statistics ==
As of match played on 14 November 2026

Club	Season	League			National Cup		Continental		Other		Total	
Club	Season	Division	Apps	Goals	Apps	Goals	Apps	Goals	Apps	Goals	Apps	Goals
Monterrey	2016–17	Liga MX	1	0	—		3 (Note: Appearances in CONCACAF Champions League)	0	—		4	0
Monterrey	2018–19	Liga MX	1	0	2	1	—		—		3	1
Monterrey	2019–20	Liga MX	4	0	11	0	—		—		15	0
Monterrey	2020–21	Liga MX	9	1	—		1	0	—		10	1
Monterrey	2021–22	Liga MX	5	0	—		—		—		5	0
Monterrey	2023–24	Liga MX	1	0	—		—		1 (Note: Appearance in Leagues Cup)	0	1	0
Monterrey	Total		21	1	13	1	4	0	1	0	39	2
Raya2 (loan)	2021–22	Liga de Expansión MX	5	0	—		—		—		5	0
Necaxa (loan)	2022–23	Liga MX	5	0	—		—		—		5	0
Atlético Morelia (loan)	2022–23	Liga de Expansión MX	21	4	—		—		—		21	4
Forge FC (loan)	2024	Canadian Premier League	25 (Note: Includes one appearance in Canadian Premier League Playoffs)	2	4	1	—		—		29	3
Atlético Morelia	2024–25	Liga de Expansión MX	13	1	—		—		—		13	1
Atlético Morelia	2025–26	Liga de Expansión MX	14	1	—		—		—		14	1
Atlético Morelia	Total		27	2	—		—		—		27	2
Querétaro (loan)	2025–26	Liga de Expansión MX	13	1	—		—		—		13	1
Querétaro (loan)	2026–27	Liga de Expansión MX	16	0	—		—		2	0	18	0
Querétaro (loan)	Total		29	1	—		—		2	0	31	1
Career total			133	10	17	2	4	0	3	0	157	12

== Honours ==
Monterrey

- CONCACAF Champions League: 2021
