= Alfonso González =

Mexican footballer (born 1994)

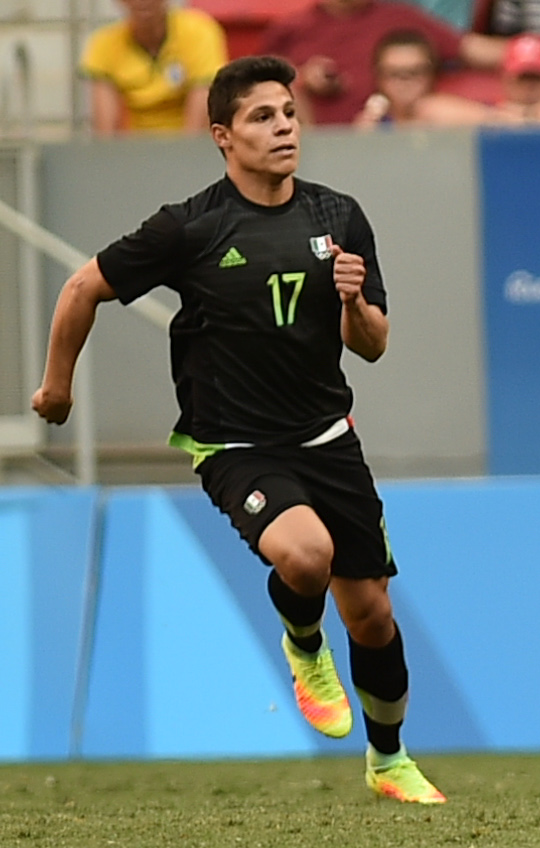
- González with Mexico at the 2016 Summer Olympics

Personal information
- Full name: Arturo Alfonso González González
- Date of birth: 5 September 1994 (age 32)
- Place of birth: Reynosa, Tamaulipas, Mexico
- Height: 1.74 m (5 ft 8 1/2 in)
- Position: Attacking midfielder

Team information
- Current team: Atlas
- Number: 58

Youth career
- 2009–2012: Atlas

Senior career*
Years	Team	Apps	(Gls)
2012–2016	Atlas	88	(14)
2016–2025	Monterrey	205	(27)
2024–2025	→ Pachuca (loan)	21	(4)
2025–	Atlas	41	(8)

International career^{‡}
2011	Mexico U17	10	(1)
2013	Mexico U20	1	(1)
2014	Mexico U21	4	(0)
2014–2016	Mexico U23	13	(4)
2014–2023	Mexico	5	(0)
Medal record
Representing Mexico
Men's football
Olympic Qualifying Championship
Winner	2015 United States
FIFA U-17 World Cup
Winner	2011 Mexico
- * Club domestic league appearances and goals as of 30 October 2026 ‡ National team caps and goals as of 16 December 2023

Arturo Alfonso González González (born 5 September 1994), also known as Ponchito, is a Mexican professional footballer who plays as a midfielder for Liga MX club Atlas.

Participating for the national team throughout various age groups, González was part of the team that won the 2011 U-17 World Cup. He made his debut with the senior Mexico national team in 2014 in a friendly match against Honduras.

== Early life ==
González was born in Reynosa, Tamaulipas, to Luis Enrique González and Irma González. As a child, he played baseball, the most popular sport in his hometown, However, after breaking an arm he began training in football. In December 2008 and January 2009 he went to the US city of Mission, Texas, to try out for the youth team of Atlas. with a positive verdict from the coaches, he joined to the club's youth academy in 2009. After two years with the Youth Academy, he was called up to represent Mexico in the 2011 U17 World Cup, after good performances the youth team of Atlas during the 2010–11 season.

== Club career ==
=== Atlas ===
==== 2011–2012 ====
González made his senior debut with Atlas on 18 February 2012 against Tigres UANL coming in as a substitute for Alonso Zamora in the 65th minute of the game. He also made another appearance against Jaguares, bringing his total to two appearances during the Clausura 2012 season.

==== 2012–2013 ====
González played his first match in the Apertura 2012 against Tigres UANL coming in the 65th minute. He appeared in the match against San Luis coming on the 53rd minute, which they lost 3–2. He came on for the second half of the Clasico Tapatio match against Guadalajara, which they lost 2–0. He played all 90 minutes against Puebla scoring his first goal in a 2–2 draw. He played the last match against León losing 3–1.

He played the first match in the Clausura 2013 against Pumas coming on in the 39th minute in a 1–1 draw. He played in the match against León losing 1–0. He played in 2 of 19 matches, which Atlas lost in the quarter-finals to Santos Laguna on a 3–1 aggerate.

==== 2013–2014 ====
He made his Apertura 2013 debut against Guadalajara on a 1–1 draw. His next game against Cruz Azul scoring a goal, but losing 2–1. He appeared against Pachuca losing 2–0. He appeared on the final game of the semester losing to Tigres 1–0.

For the Clausura 2014 he started to be a regular and contributing to the team and scoring 3 goals against Morelia, Pumas, and Jaguares. He played a total of 1,315 minutes.

==== 2014–2015 ====
He played in the first match against Tigres on a 0–0 draw. He took part in the 2–0 win over Morelia. In the third match against Jaguares, he scored a spectacular free kick goal in a 4–2 win. He was the man of the match in the game against Pumas after scoring the only goal of the match. He played against Leones Negros on a derby in a 1–0 win in a last-minute win penalty scored by Luis Nery Caballero. He played against Pachuca in a 3–1 loss, scoring a goal. He played against Santos in a 1–1 draw. He played all 90 minutes against Veracruz in another 1–1 draw. He played in a home win against Cruz Azul scoring a goal with a header. He played against Monterrey in a 2–1 away loss. He played against Querétaro in a 2–1 win. He played the Clasico Tapatío against Chivas winning 1–0 with a goal scored from Enrique Pérez.

==== 2015–2016 ====
On 1 July 2016, his move to Monterrey was confirmed.

=== Monterrey ===
==== 2016–2017 ====
On March 22, 2017, he scored a goal in a friendly match against Rio Grande Valley FC Toros to open their new HEB stadium. It was the second goal ever in the history of the stadium.

==== 2017–2018 ====
In August, he suffered a cruciate ligament tear in his right knee which left him out of the season.

==== 2019–2020 ====
With Monterrey's victory of the 2019–20 Copa MX, they had obtained the continental treble.

==== Loan to Pachuca ====
On 1 July 2024, González joined Pachuca on a one-year loan.

== International career ==
=== Youth ===
González competed in the 2011 U-17 World Cup in Mexico. He was given the number 10 shirt for the tournament, and scored his first and only goal of the tournament against Netherlands in the last minutes of the match breaking the tie, and clinching a 3–2 victory for Mexico. He would help the national team reach the final against Uruguay, where he assisted teammate Giovanni Casillas in the last few minutes in a 2–0 victory in the Azteca.

González was left out of the squad for the 2013 CONCACAF U-20 Championship by coach Sergio Almaguer. However, he appeared in the 2013 FIFA U-20 World Cup hosted in Turkey, appearing in all 4 matches and scoring one goal against Spain in the knockout stage, However, it wasn't enough since Mexico lost 1–2 and were eliminated from the tournament. Gonzalez also appeared in the 2013 and 2014 editions of the Toulon Tournament.

=== Senior ===
González received his first call-up to the senior national team on 1 October 2014, for two friendly matches against Honduras on 9 October, and Panama on 11 October 2014. He made his debut against Honduras coming in for Marco Fabián in the 76th minute of the game. Arturo became the first youth player from the 2011 U-17 national team squad to make his debut with the national team. Later he was called up again against Netherlands and Belarus on 12 and 18 November.

== Career statistics ==
=== Club ===
As of match played on 30 October 2026

Club	Season	League			Cup		Continental		Intercontinental		Other		Total	
Club	Season	Division	Apps	Goals	Apps	Goals	Apps	Goals	Apps	Goals	Apps	Goals	Apps	Goals
Atlas	2011–12	Mexican Primera División	2	0	—		—		—		—		2	0
Atlas	2012–13	Mexican Primera División	7	1	2	0	—		—		—		9	1
Atlas	2013–14	Liga MX	20	4	7	0	—		—		—		27	4
Atlas	2014–15	Liga MX	34	6	2	1	6 (Note: Appearances in Copa Libertadores)	1	—		—		42	8
Atlas	2015–16	Liga MX	25	3	6	1	—		—		—		31	4
Atlas	Total		88	14	17	2	6	1	—		—		111	17
Monterrey	2016–17	Liga MX	21	0	6	2	2 (Note: Appearances in CONCACAF Champions Cup)	0	—		—		29	2
Monterrey	2017–18	Liga MX	34	6	11	2	—		—		1 (Note: Appearance in Supercopa MX)	0	46	8
Monterrey	2018–19	Liga MX	3	0	2	1	—		—		—		5	1
Monterrey	2019–20	Liga MX	11	0	7	0	—		1 (Note: Appearances in FIFA Club World Cup)	1	—		19	1
Monterrey	2020–21	Liga MX	31	3	—		5	1	—		—		36	4
Monterrey	2021–22	Liga MX	38	5	—		—		2	0	—		40	5
Monterrey	2022–23	Liga MX	40	10	—		—		—		—		40	10
Monterrey	2023–24	Liga MX	26	3	—		3	1	—		—		29	4
Monterrey	2025–26	Liga MX	1	0	—		—		—		—		1	0
Monterrey	Total		205	27	26	5	10	2	3	1	1	0	245	35
Pachuca (loan)	2024–25	Liga MX	21	4	—		—		2 (Note: Appearances in the FIFA Intercontinental Cup)	0	2 (Note: Appearances in Leagues Cup)	0	25	4
Atlas	2025–26	Liga MX	30	7	—		—		—		2	0	32	7
Atlas	2026–27	Liga MX	11	1	—		—		—		3	0	14	1
Atlas	Total		41	8	—		—		—		5	0	46	8
Career total			355	53	43	7	16	3	5	1	8	0	427	64

=== International ===
As of 16 December 2023

Mexico
Year	Apps	Goals
2014	3	0
2021	1	0
2023	1	0
Total	5	0

== Style of play ==
An attacking-midfielder, capable of playing from the left and in a playmaker role, González possesses a good eye for a pass, and is able to beat defenders on occasion with his dribbling ability.

== Honours ==
Monterrey

- Liga MX: Apertura 2019
- Copa MX: Apertura 2017, 2019–20
- CONCACAF Champions League: 2019, 2021

Mexico Youth

- FIFA U-17 World Cup: 2011
- CONCACAF Olympic Qualifying Championship: 2015

Individual

- Liga MX Player of the Month: September 2021
