= César Montes =

Mexican footballer (born 1997)

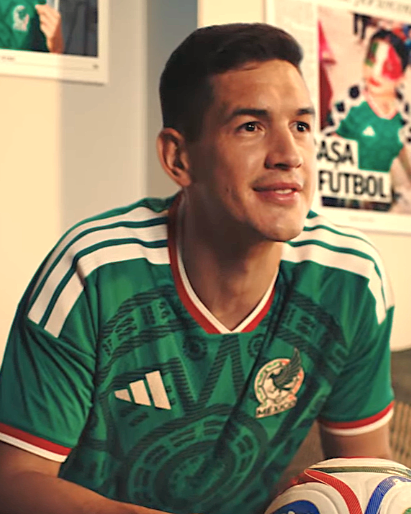
- Montes with Mexico in 2025

Personal information
- Full name: César Jasib Montes Castro
- Date of birth: 24 February 1997 (age 29)
- Place of birth: Hermosillo, Sonora, Mexico
- Height: 1.95 m (6 ft 5 in)
- Position: Centre-back

Team information
- Current team: Lokomotiv Moscow
- Number: 23

Youth career
- 2013–2014: Poblado Miguel Alemán FC
- 2014–2015: Monterrey

Senior career*
Years	Team	Apps	(Gls)
2015–2022	Monterrey	216	(9)
2023	Espanyol	20	(3)
2023–2024	Almería	22	(0)
2024–	Lokomotiv Moscow	48	(5)

International career^{‡}
2018	Mexico U21	4	(0)
2016–2021	Mexico U23	12	(0)
2017–	Mexico	72	(4)
Medal record
Men's football
Representing Mexico
CONCACAF Gold Cup
Winner	2019 United States	Team
Winner	2023 United States–Canada	Team
Winner	2025 United States–Canada	Team
CONCACAF Nations League
Winner	2025 United States
Runner-up	2024 United States
Third place	2023 United States
Olympic Games
Bronze medal – third place	2020 Tokyo	Team
Toulon Tournament
Runner-up	2018 France	Team
- * Club domestic league appearances and goals as of 22 November 2026 ‡ National team caps and goals as of 14 November 2026

César Jasib Montes Castro (born 24 February 1997) is a Mexican professional footballer who plays as a centre-back for Russian Premier League club FC Lokomotiv Moscow and the Mexico national team.

== Club career ==
=== Monterrey ===
During a youth league playoff match with Pobablo Miguel Alemán FC against Monterrey, he caught the attention of the opposing team. He was eventually brought onto Monterrey's youth team and on 2 August 2015, Montes played his first match with Monterrey against the Portuguese team Benfica on the inauguration of the Estadio BBVA Bancomer. Montes came in as a substitute for the second half, and at the 48th minute he scored the first ever-goal in the Estadio BBVA Bancomer. Monterrey defeated Benfica 3–0.

Montes made his official debut for Monterrey on 29 July 2015, against Correcaminos UAT in an Apertura 2015 Copa MX group stage match, where Monterrey defeated Correcaminos 3–1. At the end of the 2016 Clausura, he was listed in the Best XI.

At the end of December 2019, Montes would win the 2019 Apertura finals against América. With Monterrey's victory of the 2019–20 Copa MX, they had obtained the continental treble.

=== Clásico Regiomontano ===
Clásico Regiomontano matches against crosstown rivals Tigres UANL have proven to be significant for Montes, scoring three goals against them to date. He made his league debut on 19 September 2015 against Tigres UANL, contributing a 40-meter long ball assist to Rogelio Funes Mori to score the only goal for Monterrey where they lost Monterrey lost 3–1.

On 14 May 2016, he would score Monterrey's only goal of the second leg of the Clausura 2016 championship quarter-final against Tigres UANL, losing 2–1, but with an aggregate score of 4–3 in favor of Monterrey to allow them move onto the semi-final against América. On 29 October 2016, he would tie the game against Tigres UANL, 1–1. On 21 April 2017, Montes scored the only goal in a 1–0 victory over Tigres UANL.

=== Espanyol ===
On 27 December 2022, Montes moved abroad and joined La Liga club RCD Espanyol, with a contract until 2028. He made his debut for the club on 7 January 2023, in a 2–2 home draw against Girona FC.

=== Almería ===
Following Espanyol's relegation, Montes submitted a transfer request and, on September 1st, completed a move to Almería. He reportedly signed a six-year deal, with the club paying a €14 million transfer fee, making Montes the most expensive signing in the club's history.

=== Lokomotiv Moscow ===
On 12 September 2024, Montes signed for Russian Premier League club Lokomotiv Moscow on a five-year deal.

== International career ==
=== Youth ===
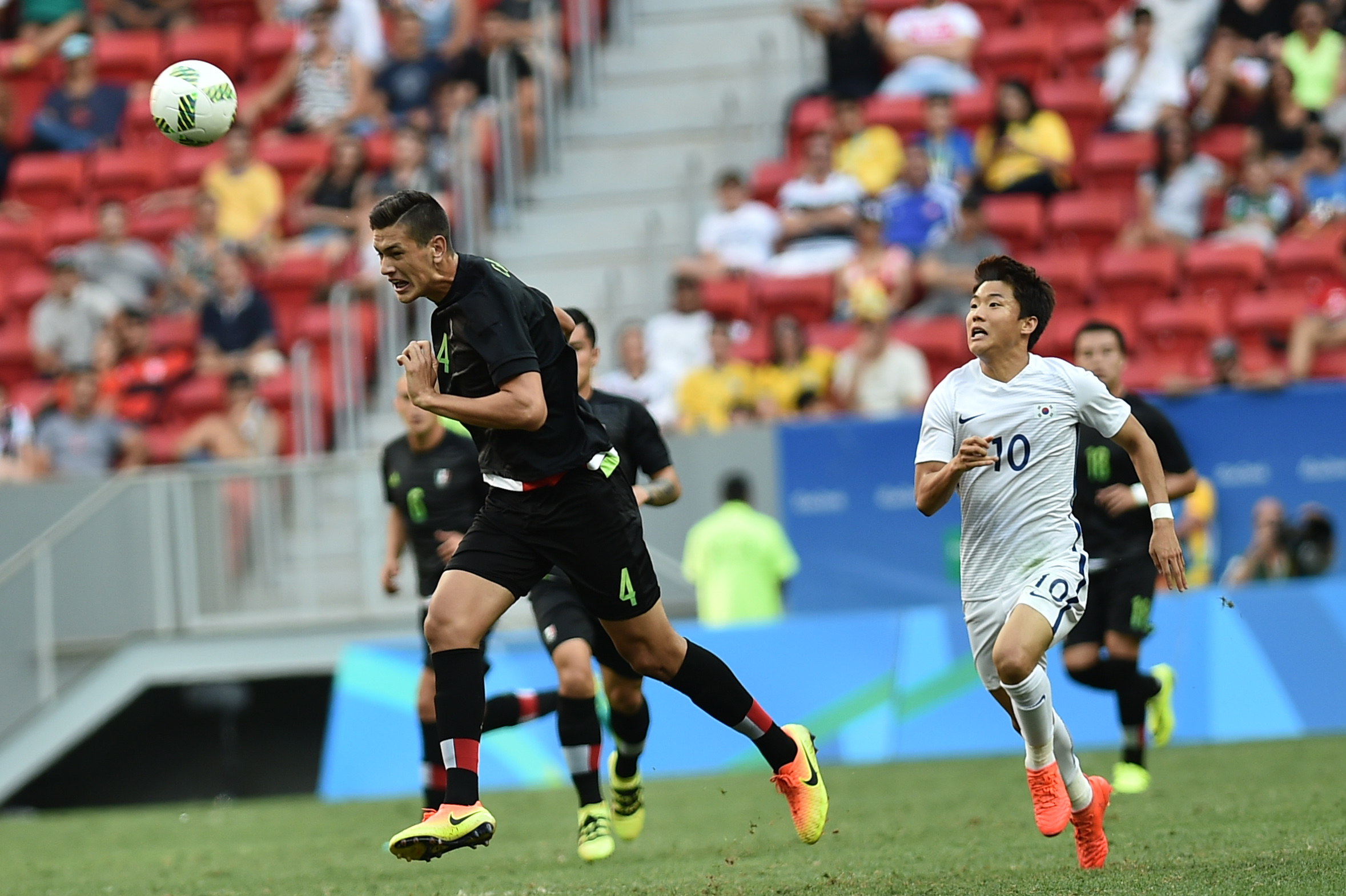
Montes playing against South Korea in the 2016 Summer Olympics

Montes was part of Marco Antonio Ruiz's roster that participated in the 2018 Toulon Tournament. He would go on to appear in all group stage matches including the semi-final, except for the final where Mexico would go to lose 1–2 against England since he picked up an injury in the previous match against Turkey. He would go on to be included in the Best XI team of the tournament.

On 7 July 2016, Montes was named by Raúl Gutiérrez to be included in Mexico's 21-man squad that would participate in the 2016 Summer Olympics in Rio de Janeiro, Brazil. He would appear in all of Mexico's group stage matches but Mexico would finish third in their group and were thus eliminated from the competition.

Ruled out for the 2020 CONCACAF Men's Olympic Qualifying Championship as it was not a FIFA-sanctioned tournament, Montes was called up by Jaime Lozano to participate in the 2020 Summer Olympics. He won the bronze medal with the Olympic team.

=== Senior ===
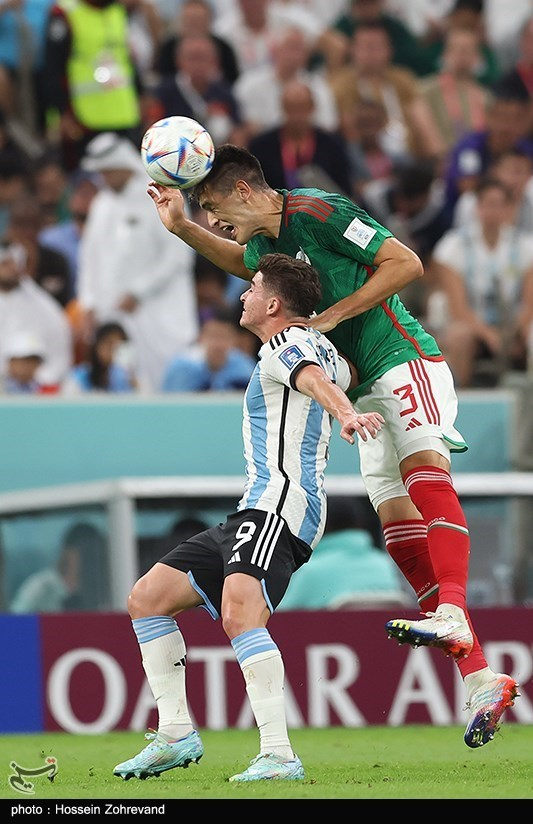
Montes playing against Argentina in the 2022 World Cup

Montes was called up by the senior national team to participate in the 2017 CONCACAF Gold Cup. He would make his debut on 13 July 2017 during a group stage match against Jamaica, coming in as a substitute for Rodolfo Pizarro at half-time, finishing the game at 0–0.

On 6 June 2019, Montes was called up by coach Gerardo Martino to participate in the CONCACAF Gold Cup. He appeared as a substitute in the group stage match against Cuba and as a starter in the final group stage match against Martinique as Mexico went on to win the tournament.

In October 2022, Montes was named in Mexico's preliminary 31-man squad for the 2022 FIFA World Cup, and in November, he was ultimately included in the final 26-man roster.

Montes was included in Diego Cocca's roster for the 2023 CONCACAF Nations League Finals. During the semi-final match against the United States, Montes was sent off in the 69th minute after getting in a physical altercation with Weston McKennie, who was also sent off in the 71st minute after a VAR check. Montes was given a four-match suspension by CONCACAF, which included the third place match against Panama and the 2023 CONCACAF Gold Cup group stage.

Montes was included in the subsequent 2023 CONCACAF Gold Cup. Mexico won the tournament after defeating Panama.

Montes was part of Javier Aguirre's roster that participated at the 2025 CONCACAF Gold Cup, scoring three times, once in Mexico's 3–2 victory over the Dominican Republic and both goals in the 2–0 win over Suriname. Mexico won the competition defeating rivals the United States 2–1 in the final. He was subsequently included in the competition's Best XI.

Montes was named in the 26-man squad for the 2026 FIFA World Cup, hosted on home soil. On 11 June 2026, Montes appeared as team captain and was sent off during added time of the opening game of 2026 FIFA World Cup against South Africa in the Estadio Azteca as Mexico won 2–0. He would go on to reappear in the subsequent matches as captain, in the third group stage match against Czech Republic, the subsequent round of 32 victory against Ecuador, and the Round of 16 loss against England.

== Style of play ==
Montes had been described as a ball-playing defender with skilled range of passing, and has shown on occasions that he is able to pick out long-range passes, and can execute a well-timed and accurate slide tackle. His stature allows him to participate in set-piece situations, specifically regarding headers and defending high passes into the penalty area.

== Personal life ==
His younger brother, Alán, is also a professional footballer, playing for Liga MX club Cruz Azul.

== Career statistics ==
=== Club ===
As of match played on 22 November 2026

Appearances and goals by club, season and competition
Club	Season	League			National cup (Note: Includes Copa MX, Copa del Rey, Russian Cup)		Continental		Other		Total	
Club	Season	Division	Apps	Goals	Apps	Goals	Apps	Goals	Apps	Goals	Apps	Goals
Monterrey	2015–16	Liga MX	33	1	4	1	—		—		37	2
Monterrey	2016–17	Liga MX	33	4	6	0	2 (Note: Appearances in CONCACAF Champions League)	1	—		41	5
Monterrey	2017–18	Liga MX	27	0	10	0	—		—		37	0
Monterrey	2018–19	Liga MX	25	2	1	0	7	0	—		33	2
Monterrey	2019–20	Liga MX	24	1	10	1	—		2 (Note: Appearance(s) in FIFA Club World Cup)	0	36	2
Monterrey	2020–21	Liga MX	30	0	—		6	0	—		36	0
Monterrey	2021–22	Liga MX	28	1	—		—		1	1	29	2
Monterrey	2022–23	Liga MX	16	0	—		—		—		16	0
Monterrey	Total		216	9	31	2	15	1	3	1	265	13
Espanyol	2022–23	La Liga	20	3	2	0	—		—		22	3
Almería	2023–24	La Liga	21	0	—		—		—		21	0
Almería	2024–25	Segunda División	1	0	—		—		—		1	0
Almería	Total		22	0	—		—		—		22	0
Lokomotiv Moscow	2024–25	Russian Premier League	16	0	4	2	—		—		20	2
Lokomotiv Moscow	2025–26	Russian Premier League	26	4	3	0	—		—		29	4
Lokomotiv Moscow	2026–27	Russian Premier League	6	1	2	0	—		—		8	1
Lokomotiv Moscow	Total		48	5	9	2	0	0	0	0	57	7
Career total			306	17	42	4	15	1	3	1	366	23

=== International ===
As of match played on 14 November 2026

Appearances and goals by national team and year
National team	Year	Apps	Goals
Mexico	2017	5	0
Mexico	2018	0	0
Mexico	2019	4 (Note: Montes additionally played a match against Martinique in 2019, which is not recognized by FIFA.)	0
Mexico	2020	2	0
Mexico	2021	7	1
Mexico	2022	15	0
Mexico	2023	9	0
Mexico	2024	9	0
Mexico	2025	12	3
Mexico	2026	9	0
Total		72	4

Scores and results list Mexico's goal tally first.

List of international goals scored by César Montes
No.	Date	Venue	Opponent	Score	Result	Competition
1.	30 June 2021	Nissan Stadium, Nashville, United States	Panama	2–0	3–0	Friendly
2.	14 June 2025	SoFi Stadium, Inglewood, United States	Dominican Republic	3–1	3–2	2025 CONCACAF Gold Cup
3.	18 June 2025	AT&T Stadium, Arlington, United States	Suriname	1–0	2–0	2025 CONCACAF Gold Cup
4.	18 June 2025	AT&T Stadium, Arlington, United States	Suriname	2–0	2–0	2025 CONCACAF Gold Cup

== Honours ==
Monterrey

- Liga MX: Apertura 2019
- Copa MX: Apertura 2017, 2019–20
- CONCACAF Champions League: 2019, 2021

Mexico U23

- Olympic Bronze Medal: 2020

Mexico

- CONCACAF Gold Cup: 2019, 2023, 2025
- CONCACAF Nations League: 2024–25

Individual

- Liga MX Best XI: Clausura 2016
- Liga MX Best Rookie: 2015–16
- Liga MX All-Star: 2021
- Toulon Tournament Best XI: 2018
- IFFHS Men's CONCACAF Best XI: 2022
- CONCACAF Gold Cup Best XI: 2025
- CONCACAF Nations League Finals Best XI: 2024
