= 2018–19 C.F. Monterrey season =

Monterrey
2018–19 season
- Owner: FEMSA
- Chairman: Duilio Davino
- Manager: Diego Alonso
- Stadium: Estadio BBVA Bancomer
- Apertura: 5th Playoffs: Semifinals
- Clausura: 3rd Playoffs: Semifinals
- Apertura Copa MX: Runners-up
- CONCACAF Champions League: Champions
- Top goalscorer: League: Rogelio Funes Mori (16 goals); All: Rogelio Funes Mori (20 goals)
- Highest home attendance: 53,327 (vs Tigres, 1 May 2019)
- Lowest home attendance: 16,681 (vs Venados, 28 August 2018)
- Average home league attendance: 39,767
- Biggest win: Monterrey 5–0 Pachuca (5 January 2019)
- Biggest defeat: Toluca 5–1 Monterrey (7 April 2019)
Home colours	Away colours	Third colours
- All statistics correct as of 13 January 2019.

The 2018–19 C.F. Monterrey season was the 83rd season in the football club's history and the 68th consecutive season in the top flight of Mexican football. In addition to the Liga MX and Copa MX, the club also competed in the CONCACAF Champions League.

== Coaching staff ==
Position	Name
Head coach	(Uruguay) Diego Alonso
Assistant coaches	(Mexico) Carlos Barra
Assistant coaches	(Argentina) Claudio Arzeno
Assistant coaches	(Argentina) Mauricio Elena
Goalkeepers coach	(Argentina) Fabián Donelli
Fitness coach	(Uruguay) Mauricio Marchetti
Therapists	(Mexico) José Cárdenas
Therapists	(Mexico) José Obregón
Therapists	(Mexico) Roberto García
Doctors	(Mexico) Francisco García
Doctors	(Mexico) Raúl Luna

== Players ==
=== Squad information ===
No.	Pos.	Nat.	Name	Date of birth (age)	Signed in	Previous club
Goalkeepers
1	GK	(Argentina)	Marcelo Barovero	18 February 1984 (age 42)	2018	(Mexico) Necaxa
22	GK	(Argentina)	Juan Pablo Carrizo	6 May 1984 (age 42)	2017	(Italy) Internazionale
24	GK	(Mexico)	Édson Reséndez	12 January 1996 (age 30)	2015	(Mexico) Youth System
Defenders
3	DF	(Mexico)	César Montes	24 February 1997 (age 29)	2015	(Mexico) Youth System
3	DF	(Argentina)	Nicolás Sánchez	4 February 1986 (age 40)	2017 (Winter)	(Argentina) Racing
6	DF	(Mexico)	Edson Gutiérrez	19 January 1996 (age 30)	2018	(Mexico) Celaya
11	DF	(Argentina)	Leonel Vangioni	5 May 1987 (age 39)	2017	(Italy) Milan
13	DF	(Argentina)	José María Basanta	3 April 1984 (age 42)	2015	(Italy) Fiorentina
23	DF	(Mexico)	Johan Vásquez	22 October 1998 (age 27)	2018	(Mexico) Sonora
33	DF	(Colombia)	Stefan Medina	14 June 1992 (age 34)	2017	(Mexico) Pachuca
Midfielders
14	MF	(Mexico)	Alfonso González	5 September 1994 (age 32)	2016	(Mexico) Atlas
16	MF	(Paraguay)	Celso Ortiz	26 January 1989 (age 37)	2016	(Netherlands) AZ
17	MF	(Mexico)	Jesús Gallardo	15 August 1994 (age 32)	2018	(Mexico) UNAM
20	MF	(Mexico)	Rodolfo Pizarro	15 February 1994 (age 32)	2018	(Mexico) Guadalajara
21	MF	(Mexico)	Jesús Molina	29 March 1988 (age 38)	2017 (Winter)	(Mexico) Santos Laguna
25	MF	(Mexico)	Jonathan González	13 April 1999 (age 27)	2017	(Mexico) Youth System
29	MF	(Mexico)	Carlos Rodríguez	3 January 1997 (age 29)	2017 (Winter)	(Mexico) Youth System
Forwards
7	FW	(Argentina)	Rogelio Funes Mori	5 March 1991 (age 35)	2015	(Turkey) Eskişehirspor
8	FW	(Colombia)	Dorlan Pabón	24 January 1988 (age 38)	2014	(Brazil) São Paulo
10	FW	(Uruguay)	Jonathan Urretaviscaya	19 March 1990 (age 36)	2018	(Mexico) Pachuca
18	FW	(Colombia)	Avilés Hurtado	20 April 1987 (age 39)	2017	(Mexico) Tijuana
19	FW	(Mexico)	Luis Madrigal	10 February 1993 (age 33)	2018	(Mexico) Youth System

Players and squad numbers last updated on 3 December 2018.
Note: Flags indicate national team as has been defined under FIFA eligibility rules. Players may hold more than one non-FIFA nationality.

== Transfers ==
=== In ===
N	Pos.	Nat.	Name	Age	Moving from	Type	Transfer window	Source
1	GK	(Argentina)	Marcelo Barovero	42	Necaxa	Loan	Summer	Mediotiempo.com
6	DF	(Mexico)	Edson Gutiérrez	30	Celaya	Transfer	Summer	
17	MF	(Mexico)	Jesús Gallardo	32	UNAM	Transfer	Summer	
19	FW	(Mexico)	Luis Madrigal	33	Oaxaca	End of Loan	Summer	
20	MF	(Mexico)	Rodolfo Pizarro	32	Guadalajara	Transfer	Summer	
23	DF	(Mexico)	Johan Vásquez	27	Sonora	Loan	Summer	
29	MF	(Mexico)	Carlos Rodríguez	29	(Spain) Toledo	End of Loan	Summer	

=== Out ===
N	Pos.	Nat.	Name	Age	Moving to	Type	Transfer window	Source
1	GK	(Mexico)	Hugo González	36	Necaxa	Loan	Summer	Mediotiempo.com
9	FW	(Argentina)	Lucas Albertengo	35	(Argentina) Independiente	Loan Return	Summer	
13	MF	(Uruguay)	Carlos Sánchez	41	(Brazil) Santos	Transfer	Summer	
17	MF	(Mexico)	Jesús Zavala	39	Zacatecas	Transfer	Summer	
20	DF	(Mexico)	Juan Álvarez	30	Unattached	Released	Summer	
23	DF	(Mexico)	Juan Portales	30	Atlético San Luis	Loan	Summer	
27	FW	(Paraguay)	Jorge Benítez	34	(Paraguay) Cerro Porteño	Transfer	Summer	
30	FW	(Mexico)	Julio Cruz	30	(Costa Rica) Guadalupe	Transfer	Summer	
32	DF	(Mexico)	Efraín Velarde	40	Morelia	Loan	Summer	
82	DF	(Mexico)	Germán Camacho	30	(Spain) Toledo	Loan	Summer	
287	MF	(Mexico)	William Mejía	27	(Spain) Toledo	Loan	Summer	
295	MF	(Mexico)	Misael Domínguez	26	Cruz Azul	Loan	Summer	

== Competitions ==
=== Overview ===
Competition	First match	Last match	Starting round	Final position	Record							
Competition	First match	Last match	Starting round	Final position	Pld	W	D	L	GF	GA	GD	Win %
Torneo Apertura	21 July 2018	8 December 2018	Matchday 1	5th	21	12	3	6	29	20	+9	57.14
Apertura Copa MX	1 August 2018	31 October 2018	Group stage	Runners-up	8	5	2	1	14	6	+8	62.50
Torneo Clausura	5 January 2019	18 May 2019	Matchday 1	3rd	21	10	6	5	35	23	+12	47.62
CONCACAF Champions League	20 February 2019	1 May 2019	Round of 16	Winners	8	5	2	1	16	4	+12	62.50
Total					58	32	13	13	94	53	+41	55.17

Last updated: 6 March 2019
Source: Mediotiempo.com

=== Torneo Apertura ===
==== League table ====
Pos	Team	Pld	W	D	L	GF	GA	GD	Pts	Qualification or relegation
3	Pumas	17	8	6	3	29	19	+10	30	Advance to Liguilla (Note: The first 8 places in the table qualified for the Liguilla. The last ranked team in the relegation table could qualify for the Liguilla in the Apertura tournament.)
4	Santos Laguna	17	8	6	3	27	18	+9	30	Advance to Liguilla
5	Monterrey	17	9	3	5	25	19	+6	30	Advance to Liguilla
6	Tigres	17	8	5	4	32	18	+14	29	Advance to Liguilla
7	Toluca	17	8	2	7	27	22	+5	26	Advance to Liguilla

Source: Liga MX
Rules for classification: 1) Points; 2) Goal difference; 3) Number of goals scored; 4) Head-to-head results between tied teams; 5) Number of goals scored away; 6) Highest relegation coefficient; 7) Fair Play points

==== Results summary ====
Overall								Home						Away					
Pld	W	D	L	GF	GA	GD	Pts	W	D	L	GF	GA	GD	W	D	L	GF	GA	GD
17	9	3	5	25	19	+6	30	6	1	1	17	9	+8	3	2	4	8	10	−2

Last updated: 3 December 2018.
Source: LigaMX

==== Result round by round ====
Round	1	2	3	4	5	6	7	8	9	10	11	12	13	14	15	16	17
Ground	A	A	H	A	H	A	H	A	H	A	H	A	H	A	H	A	H
Result	W	W	W	L	W	W	D	L	L	D	W	L	W	L	W	D	W
Position	8	3	3	5	3	2	2	2	6	6	4	6	5	6	6	5	5

Updated to match(es) played on 3 December 2018. Source: LigaMX
A = Away; H = Home; W = Win; D = Draw; L = Loss

==== Matches ====
21 July 2018 1	Pachuca	0–1	Monterrey	Pachuca
19:00		Report	Hurtado 64'	Stadium: Estadio Hidalgo; Attendance: 26,567; Referee: Diego Montaño

29 July 2018 2	León	0–2	Monterrey	León
20:00		Report	Sánchez 73'; Funes Mori 90+2'	Stadium: Estadio León; Attendance: 17,712; Referee: Erick Yair Miranda

4 August 2018 3	Monterrey	2–1	Querétaro	Guadalupe
21:06	Sánchez 28'; Hurtado 89'	Report	Puch 22'	Stadium: Estadio BBVA Bancomer; Attendance: 42,288; Referee: Oscar Mejía

11 August 2018 4	América	3–0	Monterrey	Mexico City
21:00	Martínez 23'; Valdez 49'; Ibargüen 84'	Report		Stadium: Estadio Azteca; Attendance: 24,346; Referee: Jorge Antonio Pérez Durán

18 August 2018 5	Monterrey	1–0	UNAM	Guadalupe
21:06	Sánchez 3'	Report		Stadium: Estadio BBVA Bancomer; Attendance: 40,268; Referee: Diego Montaño

22 August 2018 6	BUAP	1–2	Monterrey	Puebla City
21:00	Kazim-Richards 70'	Report	Ortiz 11'; Sánchez 90+2'	Stadium: Estadio Universitario BUAP; Attendance: 7,836; Referee: Jorge Isaac Rojas

25 August 2018 7	Monterrey	2–2	Morelia	Guadalupe
21:06	Medina 6'; Madrigal 28'	Report	Millar 31'; Ferreira 86'	Stadium: Estadio BBVA Bancomer; Attendance: 40,129; Referee: Adonai Escobedo

31 August 2018 8	Puebla	2–1	Monterrey	Puebla City
21:00	Tabó 68'; Cavallini 90+3'	Report	Madrigal 41'	Stadium: Estadio Cuauhtémoc; Attendance: 9,550; Referee: Fernando Guerrero

15 September 2018 9	Monterrey	2–4	Guadalajara	Guadalupe
21:06	Pabón 49'; Medina 65'	Report	Van Rankin 43'; Marín 67'; Sandoval 76'; Cervantes 84'	Stadium: Estadio BBVA Bancomer; Attendance: 37,812; Referee: Francisco Chacón

23 September 2018 10	Tigres	0–0	Monterrey	San Nicolás de los Garza
20:00		Report		Stadium: Estadio Universitario; Attendance: 41,615; Referee: Jorge Antonio Pérez Durán

29 September 2018 11	Monterrey	3–0	Tijuana	Guadalupe
21:06	Funes Mori 10'; Sánchez 55'; Gallardo 75'	Report		Stadium: Estadio BBVA Bancomer; Attendance: 32,597; Referee: Jonathan Hernández

6 October 2018 12	Cruz Azul	2–1	Monterrey	Mexico City
17:00	Hernández 21'; Méndez 71'	Report	Montes 15'	Stadium: Estadio Azteca; Attendance: 27,689; Referee: Fernando Hernández

21 October 2018 13	Monterrey	2–1	Toluca	Guadalupe
20:06	Gallardo 72'; Lajud 84'	Report	González 49'	Stadium: Estadio BBVA Bancomer; Attendance: 29,444; Referee: Fernando Guerrero

26 October 2018 14	Santos	1–0	Monterrey	Torreón
19:00	Furch 16'	Report		Stadium: Estadio Corona; Attendance: 22,887; Referee: César Arturo Ramos

3 November 2018 15	Monterrey	2–0	Veracruz	Guadalupe
20:06	Pizarro 24'; Gallardo 71'	Report		Stadium: Estadio BBVA Bancomer; Attendance: 28,482

10 November 2018 16	Necaxa	1–1	Monterrey	Aguascalientes City
21:00	Gallegos 70'	Report	Pabón 10'	Stadium: Estadio Victoria; Attendance: 11,534; Referee: Jorge Antonio Pérez Durán

24 November 2018 17	Monterrey	3–1	Atlas	Guadalupe
21:06	Sánchez 25'; Funes Mori 56'; Madrigal 79'	Report	Duque 87'	Stadium: BBVA Bancomer; Attendance: 31,758; Referee: Roberto García Orozco

==== Liguilla ====
===== Quarter-finals =====
28 November 2018 First leg	Monterrey	1–0	Santos	Guadalupe
21:06	Funes Mori 59'	Report		Stadium: Estadio BBVA Bancomer; Attendance: 24,723; Referee: Luis Enrique Santander

1 December 2018 Second leg	Santos	0–2 (0–3 agg.)	Monterrey	Torreón
21:00		Report	Sánchez 53'; Funes Mori 58'	Stadium: Estadio Corona; Attendance: 25,900; Referee: Jorge Isaac Rojas

===== Semi-finals =====
5 December 2018 First leg	Monterrey	1–0	Cruz Azul	Guadalupe
20:06 CST	Pizarro 3'; Funes Mori (yellow card) 88'; Pabón (yellow card) 88'	Report	Alvarado (yellow card) 51'; Aldrete (yellow card) 62'; Cauteruccio (yellow card) 68'	Stadium: Estadio BBVA Bancomer; Attendance: 36,721; Referee: César Arturo Ramos

8 December 2018 Second leg	Cruz Azul	1–0 (1–1 agg.)	Monterrey	Mexico City
19:00 CST	Marcone (yellow card) 29'; Caraglio 54', (yellow card) 74'; J. Domínguez (yellow card) 69'; Baca (yellow card) 90+1'	Report	Vangioni (yellow card) 23'; Medina (yellow card) 76'; Funes Mori (yellow card) 79'	Stadium: Estadio Azteca; Attendance: 39,307; Referee: Fernando Guerrero
Note: 1–1 on aggregate and tied on away goals. Cruz Azul advanced as the higher seed in the classification table.

=== Apertura Copa MX ===
==== Group stage ====
Pos	Team	Pld	W	D	L	GF	GA	GD	Pts	Qualification
1	Monterrey	4	3	1	0	9	4	+5	10	Advance to knockout stage
2	Puebla	4	2	1	1	4	3	+1	7	Advance to knockout stage
3	Venados	4	0	0	4	2	8	−6	0	

Source: Copa MX
Rules for classification: Tiebreakers

1 August 2018 1	Monterrey	2–1	Puebla	Guadalupe
21:00	Madrigal 18'; Lajud 19'	Report	Goulart 83'	Stadium: Estadio BBVA Bancomer; Attendance: 26,040; Referee: Alejandro Funk

7 August 2018 2	Venados	0–3	Monterrey	Mérida
21:00		Report	Parra 26'; González 48'; Madrigal 67'	Stadium: Estadio Carlos Iturralde; Attendance: 7,278; Referee: Alan Enrique Martínez Vega

14 August 2018 3	Puebla	1–1	Monterrey	Puebla City
21:00	Palacios 84'	Report	Lajud 22'	Stadium: Estadio Cuauhtémoc; Attendance: 4,538; Referee: Jorge Isaac Rojas

28 August 2018 4	Monterrey	3–2	Venados	Guadalupe
21:00	Urretaviscaya 2'; Rodríguez 52'; Madrigal 90+4'	Report	Robles 12'; Villafana 17'	Stadium: Estadio BBVA Bancomer; Attendance: 16,681; Referee: Roberto Ríos Jácome

==== Round of 16 ====
2 October 2018	Monterrey	4–2	Zacatepec	Guadalupe
21:15	Sánchez 20'; Lajud 26'; Gallardo 34'; Pabón 90+5'	Report	Gallardo 34' (o.g.); Ramírez 67'	Stadium: Estadio BBVA Bancomer; Attendance: 23,260; Referee: José Alfredo Peñaloza

==== Quarterfinals ====
9 October 2018	Monterrey	1–0	Querétaro	Guadalupe
20:30	Sanvezzo 7' (o.g.)	Report		Stadium: Estadio BBVA Bancomer; Attendance: 26,361; Referee: Jorge Antonio Pérez Durán

==== Semifinal ====
23 October 2018	Pachuca	3–3 (3–4 p)	Monterrey	Pachuca
21:06	Tapias 2'; Jara 44'; Giménez 90+6'	Report	Funes Mori 10', 20'; Lajud 46'	Stadium: Estadio Hidalgo; Attendance: 22,385; Referee: Luis Enrique Santander
	Penalties
	Giménez (penalty scored); Tapias (penalty scored); R. López (penalty missed); Jara (penalty scored); Guzmán (penalty missed)		(penalty scored) Vangioni; (penalty scored) Madrigal; (penalty missed) Molina; (penalty scored) Vásquez; (penalty scored) Gallardo

==== Final ====
31 October 2018 Final	Monterrey	0–2	Cruz Azul	Guadalupe
20:36		Report	Hernández 33'; Cauteruccio 52'	Stadium: Estadio BBVA Bancomer; Attendance: 49,764; Referee: Fernando Guerrero

=== Torneo Clausura ===
==== League table ====
Pos	Team	Pld	W	D	L	GF	GA	GD	Pts	Qualification or relegation
1	León	17	13	2	2	41	14	+27	41	Advance to Liguilla (Note: The first 8 places in the table qualified for the Liguilla.)
2	Tigres UANL (C)	17	11	4	2	33	16	+17	37	Advance to Liguilla
3	Monterrey	17	8	6	3	33	21	+12	30	Advance to Liguilla
4	Cruz Azul	17	8	6	3	26	15	+11	30	Advance to Liguilla
5	América	17	9	2	6	28	19	+9	29	Advance to Liguilla

Source: Liga MX
Rules for classification: 1) Points; 2) Goal difference; 3) Number of goals scored; 4) Head-to-head results between tied teams; 5) Number of goals scored away; 6) Highest relegation coefficient; 7) Fair Play points
(C) Champions

==== Results summary ====
Overall								Home						Away					
Pld	W	D	L	GF	GA	GD	Pts	W	D	L	GF	GA	GD	W	D	L	GF	GA	GD
17	8	6	3	33	21	+12	30	4	5	0	23	9	+14	4	1	3	10	12	−2

Last updated: 2 March 2019.
Source: LigaMX

==== Result round by round ====
Round	1	2	3	4	5	6	7	8	9	10	11	12	13	14	15	16	17
Ground	H	H	A	H	A	H	A	H	A	H	A	H	A	H	A	H	A
Result	W	D	W	W	D	W	W	D	W	D	L	D	L	W	W	D	L
Position	1	4	2	1	1	1	1	2	2	3	3	4	4	3	2	2	3

Updated to match(es) played on 2 March 2019. Source: LigaMX
A = Away; H = Home; W = Win; D = Draw; L = Loss

==== Matches ====
5 January 2019 1	Monterrey	5–0	Pachuca	Guadalupe
17:06	Hurtado 10'; González 50'; Funes Mori 57', 73'; Zaldívar 83'	Report		Stadium: Estadio BBVA Bancomer; Attendance: 39,853; Referee: Jorge Isaac Rojas

12 January 2019 2	Monterrey	2–2	León	Guadalupe
17:00	Sánchez 54', 71'	Report	Angulo 73'; Mosquera 90+3'	Stadium: Estadio BBVA Bancomer; Attendance: 43,583; Referee: Francisco Chacón

19 January 2019 3	Querétaro	1–2	Monterrey	Querétaro
17:00	Camilo 30'	Report	Gallardo 54'; Meza 90'	Stadium: Estadio Corregidora; Attendance: 13,970; Referee: Diego Montaño Robles

26 January 2019 4	Monterrey	3–2	América	Guadalupe
17:00	Sánchez 13'; Funes Mori 66', 69'	Report	Álvarez 24'; Valdez 80'	Stadium: Estadio BBVA Bancomer; Attendance: 46,292; Referee: Fernando Guerrero Ramírez

3 February 2019 5	UNAM	1–1	Monterrey	Mexico City
12:00	Iturbe 83'	Report	Pabón 27'	Stadium: Olímpico Universitario; Attendance: 17,825; Referee: Oscar Macías Romo

9 February 2019 6	Monterrey	4–0	BUAP	Guadalupe
17:00	Pizarro 20'; Meza 24'; Sánchez 78'; Funes Mori 84'	Report		Stadium: Estadio BBVA Bancomer; Attendance: 39,364; Referee: Eduardo Galvan Basulto

15 February 2019 7	Morelia	2–3	Monterrey	Morelia
19:00	Flores 30'; Lezcano 59'	Report	Funes Mori 29', 77'; Rodríguez 90'	Stadium: Estadio Morelos; Attendance: 18,951; Referee: Roberto Rios Jácome

23 February 2019 8	Monterrey	0–0	Puebla	Guadalupe
19:00		Report		Stadium: Estadio BBVA Bancomer; Attendance: 43,219; Referee: Jorge Antonio Pérez Durán

2 March 2019 9	Guadalajara	0–2	Monterrey	Zapopan
21:00		Report	Pabón 2', 89'	Stadium: Estadio Akron; Attendance: 32,233; Referee: Adonai Escobedo Gonzalez

9 March 2019 10	Monterrey	1–1	Tigres	Guadalupe
19:00	Pabón (yellow card) 17'; Funes Mori 33', (yellow card) 78'; Montes (yellow card) 70'; Sánchez (yellow card) 85'	Report	Meza (yellow card) 22'; Pizarro (yellow card) 43'; Quiñones 80', (yellow card) 80'	Stadium: Estadio BBVA Bancomer; Referee: César Arturo Ramos Palazuelos

16 March 2019 11	Tijuana	1–0	Monterrey	Tijuana
19:06	Bolaños 67'; Lajud (yellow card) 69'; Bou (yellow card) 70'	Report	Vangioni (yellow card) 44'	Stadium: Estadio Caliente; Referee: Diego Montaño Robles

30 March 2019 12	Monterrey	2–2	Cruz Azul	Guadalupe
21:00	Funes Mori (yellow card) 16'; Vangioni (yellow card) 16'; Hurtado 44'; Montes 48'	Report	Madueña (yellow card) 18'; Baca (yellow card) 23'; Yotún (yellow card) 40'; Caraglio 75'; Lichnovsky 90'	Stadium: Estadio BBVA Bancomer; Referee: Eduardo Galvan Basulto

7 April 2019 13	Toluca	5–1	Monterrey	Toluca
12:00	da Silva (yellow card) 3', (goal) 44'; Pardo (yellow card) 14', (goal) 63', 65'; Canelo 72'; Maidana (yellow card) 75'; Medina 82'	Report	Vásquez (yellow card) 38'; Medina (yellow card) 69'; Pizarro 71'; Vangioni (yellow card) 77'	Stadium: Estadio Nemesio Díez; Referee: Marco Antonio Ortiz Nava

13 April 2019 14	Monterrey	4–0	Santos	Guadalupe
21:00	Pizarro 22'; Funes Mori 60', 76', 87'	Report	Quiñones (yellow card) 75'	Stadium: Estadio BBVA Bancomer; Referee: Luis Enrique Santander Aguirre

19 April 2019 15	Veracruz	0–1	Monterrey	Boca del Río
21:00	Luna (yellow card) 67'; García (yellow card) 73'; Bonilha (yellow card) 78'	Report	Gallardo (yellow card) 65'; Vangioni 69'; Vásquez (yellow card) 70'	Stadium: Estadio Luis "Pirata" Fuente; Referee: Jorge Isaac Rojas Castillo

27 April 2019 16	Monterrey	2–2	Necaxa	Guadalupe
19:00	Vásquez 23'; Bareiro 44'	Report	Fernández 2'; Álvarez 61'	Stadium: Estadio BBVA Bancomer

5 May 2019 17	Atlas	2–0	Monterrey	Guadalajara
21:00	Torres 21'; Vigon 87'	Report		Stadium: Estadio Jalisco

==== Liguilla ====
===== Quarter-finals =====
9 May 2019 First leg	Necaxa	1–0	Monterrey	Aguascalientes
19:00	Cristian Calderón 45'			Stadium: Estadio Victoria; Attendance: 23,200

12 May 2019 Second leg	Monterrey	1–0 (1–1 agg.)	Necaxa	Guadalupe
20:00	Rodolfo Pizarro 41'			Stadium: Estadio BBVA Bancomer; Attendance: 46,200

===== Semi-finals =====
15 May 2019 First leg	Monterrey	1–0	Tigres	Guadalupe
21:00	Dorlan Pabón 13'			Stadium: Estadio BBVA Bancomer; Attendance: 50,027

18 May 2019 Second leg	Tigres	1–0 (1–1 agg.)	Monterrey	San Nicolás
19:00	Guido Pizarro 42'			Stadium: Estadio Universitario; Attendance: 41,500

=== CONCACAF Champions League ===
==== Round of 16 ====
20 February 2019 First leg	Alianza (El Salvador)	0–0	(Mexico) Monterrey	San Salvador
22:00 (21:00 UTC−6)		Report		Stadium: Estadio Cuscatlán; Referee: Kevin Morrison (Jamaica)

27 February 2019 Second leg	Monterrey (Mexico)	1–0 (1–0 agg.)	(El Salvador) Alianza	Guadalupe
22:00 (21:00 UTC−6)	Sánchez 86' (pen.)	Report		Stadium: Estadio BBVA Bancomer; Referee: David Gantar (Canada)

==== Quarter-finals ====
6 March 2019 First leg	Monterrey (Mexico)	3–0	(United States) Atlanta United	Guadalupe
22:00 (21:00 UTC−6)	Sánchez 17' (pen.); Pabón 80'; Gallardo 84'	Report		Stadium: Estadio BBVA Bancomer; Referee: Ismael Cornejo (El Salvador)

13 March 2019 Second leg	Atlanta United (United States)	1–0 (1–3 agg.)	(Mexico) Monterrey	Atlanta
20:00 (20:00 UTC−4)	Parkhurst (yellow card) 60'; J. Martínez 77'	Report	Pizarro (yellow card) 84'	Stadium: Mercedes-Benz Stadium; Attendance: 40,048; Referee: Henry Bejarano

==== Semifinals ====
Kickoff times are in CST (UTC-06) unless shown otherwise

April 4, 2019 First leg	Monterrey (Mexico)	5–0	(United States) Sporting Kansas City	Guadalupe
9:00 PM	Pabón 7', 76'; Hurtado 14'; Sánchez (yellow card) 49', (goal) 70' (pen.); Gallardo 55'; Montes (yellow card) 67'	Report	Fontàs (yellow card) 30'; Zusi (yellow card) 58'	Stadium: Estadio BBVA Bancomer; Referee: Mario Escobar

April 11, 2019 Second leg	Sporting Kansas City (United States)	2–5 (2–10 agg.)	(Mexico) Monterrey	Kansas City, United States
8:00 PM	Gerso 6', 29'; Gutiérrez (yellow card) 26'; Ilie (yellow card) 60'	Report	Funes Mori 20', 90+1'; Montes (yellow card) 36'; Pizarro 39'; Layún 61'; Hurtado 82'	Stadium: Children's Mercy Park; Attendance: 18,467; Referee: Joel Aguilar

==== Finals ====
April 23, 2019 First leg	Tigres (Mexico)	0–1	(Mexico) Monterrey	San Nicolás
9:00 PM			Sánchez 43'	Stadium: Estadio Universitario

May 1, 2019 Second leg	Monterrey (Mexico)	1–1 (2–1 agg.)	(Mexico) Tigres	Guadalupe
9:00 PM	Sánchez 26' (pen.)		Gignac 85'	Stadium: Estadio BBVA Bancomer

== Statistics ==
=== Goals ===
As of 18 May 2019

Rank	Player	Position	Apertura	Ap. Copa MX	Clausura	Concacaf CL	Total
1	(Argentina) Rogelio Funes Mori	FW	5	2	11	2	20
2	(Argentina) Nicolás Sánchez	DF	7	1	4	5	17
3	(Colombia) Dorlan Pabón	FW	2	1	4	3	10
4	(Mexico) Jesús Gallardo	MF	3	1	1	2	7
4	(Mexico) Rodolfo Pizarro	MF	2	0	4	1	7
6	(Mexico) Luis Madrigal	FW	3	3	0	0	6
6	(Colombia) Avilés Hurtado	FW	2	0	2	2	6
8	(Mexico) Daniel Lajud	MF	1	4	0	0	5
9	(Colombia) Stefan Medina	DF	2	0	0	0	2
10	(Mexico) Alfonso González	MF	0	1	0	0	1
10	(Mexico) Jonathan González	MF	0	0	1	0	1
10	(Mexico) César Montes	DF	1	0	0	0	1
10	(Paraguay) Celso Ortiz	MF	1	0	0	0	1
10	(Mexico) Daniel Parra	DF	0	1	0	0	1
10	(Mexico) Carlos Rodríguez	MF	0	1	0	0	1
10	(Uruguay) Jonathan Urretaviscaya	FW	0	1	0	0	1
10	(Mexico) Ángel Zaldívar	FW	0	0	1	0	1
Total			28	16	7	1	52

=== Clean sheets ===
As of 13 January 2019

Rank	Name	Apertura	Ap. Copa MX	Clausura	Concacaf CL	Total
1	(Argentina) Marcelo Barovero	9	0	1	0	10
2	(Argentina) Juan Pablo Carrizo	0	2	0	0	2
Total		9	2	1	0	12
