= Rodolfo Pizarro =

Mexican footballer (born 1994)

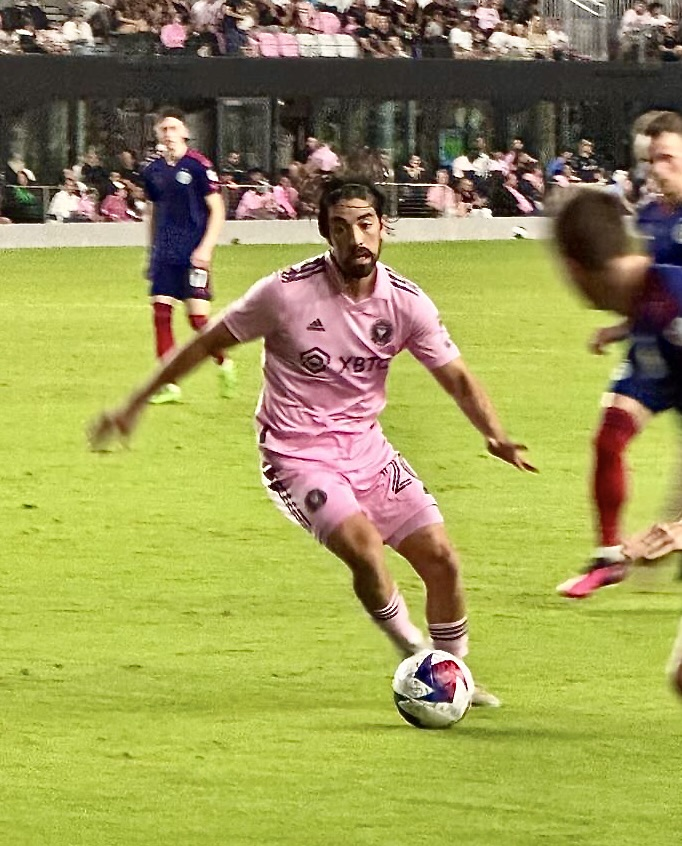
- Pizarro with Inter Miami in 2023

Personal information
- Full name: Rodolfo Gilbert Pizarro Thomas
- Date of birth: 15 February 1994 (age 32)
- Place of birth: Tampico, Tamaulipas, Mexico
- Height: 1.78 m (5 ft 10 in)
- Position: Attacking midfielder

Team information
- Current team: Pachuca (on loan from Juárez)
- Number: 7

Youth career
- 2009–2011: Orinegros Ciudad Madero
- 2011–2013: Pachuca

Senior career*
| Years | Team | Apps | (Gls) |
| 2012–2016 | Pachuca | 134 | (8) |
| 2017–2018 | Guadalajara | 45 | (13) |
| 2018–2019 | Monterrey | 51 | (8) |
| 2020–2023 | Inter Miami | 59 | (7) |
| 2022–2023 | → Monterrey (loan) | 30 | (1) |
| 2023–2024 | AEK Athens | 16 | (0) |
| 2024–2025 | Mazatlán | 23 | (0) |
| 2025– | Juárez | 35 | (4) |
| 2026– | → Pachuca (loan) | 16 | (0) |

International career^{‡}
| 2014 | Mexico U21 | 3 | (0) |
| 2015–2016 | Mexico U23 | 8 | (1) |
| 2014–2022 | Mexico | 37 | (5) |
Medal record
Men's football
CONCACAF Gold Cup
Representing Mexico
| Winner | 2019 United States |
| Runner-up | 2021 United States |
Olympic Qualifying Championship
| Winner | 2015 United States |
- * Club domestic league appearances and goals as of 21 November 2026 ‡ National team caps and goals as of 11 June 2022

Rodolfo Gilbert Pizarro Thomas (born 15 February 1994) is a Mexican professional footballer who plays as an attacking midfielder for Liga MX club Pachuca, on loan from Juárez.

Pizarro made his professional debut with Pachuca, where he spent four years before transferring to Guadalajara. Although his stint at the club was brief, he played a key role in helping them secure three trophies, including the domestic double. Just eighteen months later, he joined Monterrey in what was, at the time, the most expensive signing in the league's history. Pizarro later continued his career with Inter Miami, AEK Athens, Mazatlán and Juárez.

He has participated for the U-21, the U-23, and the senior levels of Mexico's national team. He has represented Mexico at the 2016 Summer Olympics and the 2017, 2019, and 2021 CONCACAF Gold Cups.

== Club career ==
=== Pachuca ===
Pizarro started his youth career with Orinegros Ciudad Madero, and joined the Pachuca Youth System in 2011. Pizarro made his debut with the senior team on 14 September 2012 coming in on as a substitute in the 71st minute in a 3–2 win over Morelia. At the time of his debut, he played as a right-back.

On 19 February 2013, during a Copa MX group stage match against Dorados de Sinaloa, he would score his first goal in a 5–2 loss.

Pizarro, along with fellow youth system teammates Hirving Lozano and Érick Gutiérrez, proved to be vital in Pachuca's winning of the Clausura 2016 championship.

=== Guadalajara ===
In December 2016, Pachuca announced the transfer of Pizarro to Guadalajara in a deal reportedly worth up to $15 million, which also involved Víctor Guzmán permanently joining Pachuca. On 7 January 2017, Pizarro made his debut against Club Universidad Nacional, playing the whole match in which Guadalajara won 2–1. A week later, Pizarro scored his first goal for Guadalajara against Monterrey from a long range shot, the game ended 2–2.

In April, Guadalajara won the Clausura Copa MX final against Morelia. The following month, Pizarro would prove to be vital during the Clausura championship, managing to score in the first leg of the final against Tigres UANL as Guadalajara would go on to win the title, finishing an eleven-year-long drought of league titles. As a result, Guadalajara won their first Double since the 1969–70 season.

In the first leg of the 2018 CONCACAF Champions League Finals against Major League Soccer team Toronto FC, Pizarro scored the first goal of the match within the second minute, in an eventual 2–1 victory, also being named Man of the Match. As Guadalajara went on to win the finals following a penalty shoot-out victory of 4–2, Pizarro won the Best Young Player award and was listed on the Best XI of the tournament.

=== Monterrey ===
On 4 June 2018, after much media speculation, Guadalajara sporting director Francisco Gabriel de Anda officially announced that Pizarro was being transferred to fellow league club Monterrey, for a reported $16 million, making him the costliest interleague transfer in Liga MX history. Rejoining former Pachuca manager Diego Alonso, Pizarro would make his debut with Monterrey on 21 July 2018 in a 1–0 victory against his youth club, Pachuca. On 5 November, he would score his first goal with the team in a 2–0 win over Veracruz.

He was an integral part of the team as he helped Monterrey win the 2019 CONCACAF Champions League Finals title against crosstown rivals Tigres UANL, their fourth title. This made Pizarro alongside teammate Angel Zaldívar the first players to win the tournament in back–to–back years with two different teams. Following the end of his first season with Monterrey, he was listed in the Best XI of the Clausura.

Following an impressive campaign with Mexico over the summer, Sky Sport Italia linked Pizarro with A.C. Milan. On 14 December, following Monterrey's 3–2 quarter-final victory over Al Sadd at the 2019 FIFA Club World Cup, he was named Man of the Match. At the end of the month, he would win the Apertura championship against América, with Pizzaro being handed a starting berth in both legs of the final.

=== Inter Miami ===
On 14 February 2020, Pizarro left Monterrey for Major League Soccer expansion side Inter Miami, following a protracted dispute between the clubs about the activation of his release clause, rejoining head coach Diego Alonso for a third time, his coach at both Pachuca and Monterrey. The following day, despite not officially being announced as a signing for the club, Pizarro scored the first goal for Miami in a 2–1 preseason friendly loss to Philadelphia Union. That same day, Monterrey filed a complaint with FIFA against Pizarro and Inter Miami for improper contact between the player and Inter Miami co-owner David Beckham while Pizarro was still under contract with Monterrey. FIFA's investigation was still on-going when news of the complaint broke on 4 March.

On 17 February, Pizarro's move to Miami was made official, labeled as the club's second Designated Player. Pizarro played in the team's league debut on 1 March, in a 1–0 loss to Los Angeles FC. The following week, he scored the team's first league goal in a 1–2 loss against D.C. United. Toward the end of his first season, he, alongside teammate Lewis Morgan, was nominated for the Landon Donovan MVP Award.

In January 2022, Pizarro returned to Monterrey on a one-year loan. On 14 July 2023, Inter Miami and Pizarro agreed to mutually terminate their contract.

=== Later career ===
In July 2023, Pizarro signed a two-year contract with Super League Greece club AEK Athens. The move had him rejoin former Guadalajara manager Matías Almeyda and former Guadalajara teammate Orbelín Pineda. In September 2024, he returned to México to join Mazatlán.

In June 2025, Pizarro signed with Juárez. A year later, he returned to his boyhood club Pachuca on a one-year loan.

== International career ==
=== Youth ===
Pizarro was included by Raúl Gutiérrez to participate in the 2014 Toulon Tournament. Mexico would fail to qualify to the next round after placing third in the group stage.

On 18 September 2015, Rodolfo Pizarro was selected by coach Raúl Gutiérrez to play in the CONCACAF Men's Olympic Qualifying Championship. Mexico went on to win the tournament and qualified for the 2016 Summer Olympics as Pizarro was named to the tournament's Best XI.

On 7 July 2016, Pizarro was named in Mexico's 18-man squad that would participate in the 2016 Summer Olympics in Rio de Janeiro, Brazil. In Mexico's first group stage match against Germany, he scored Mexico's second goal to make the game 2–1 but was eventually tied 2–2. In Mexico's second group stage match against Fiji, Pizarro along with teammate Oribe Peralta, would pick up injuries. They were subsequently replaced by Carlos Fierro and Raúl López Gómez.

=== Senior ===
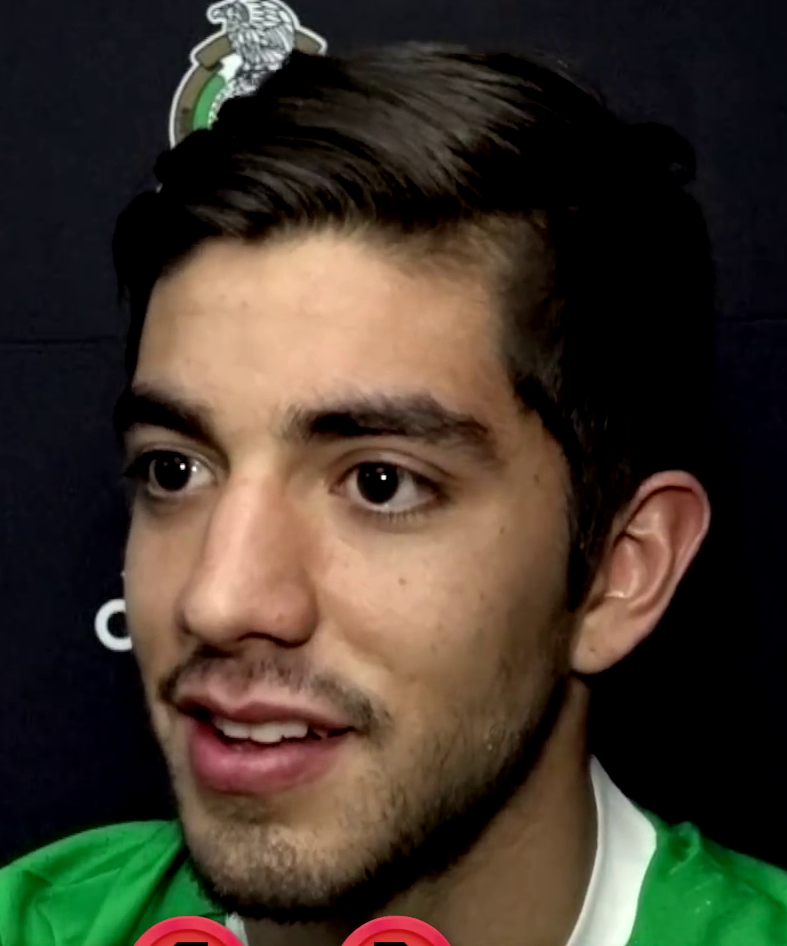
Pizarro with Mexico in 2016

On 29 January 2014, Pizarro made his senior national team debut in a friendly game against South Korea, playing all 90 minutes. On 10 February 2016, Pizarro scored his first goal for Mexico in the 87th minute of the friendly match against Senegal, with the match finishing 2–0.

On 28 June 2017, Pizarro was called up to participate in the 2017 CONCACAF Gold Cup. In the quarter-final match against Honduras, he scored the only goal of the match at the 4th minute, winning 1–0.

Pizarro was controversially left out of the 23-man squad for the 2018 FIFA World Cup.

With the arrival of Gerardo Martino as Mexico's new coach, Pizarro has been given precedence. In March 2019, Pizarro declared that it was a motivating gesture that Martino treated the domestic league players with the same importance and opportunity as those based in Europe. He was included in Mexico's preliminary list for the 2019 CONCACAF Gold Cup and was eventually in the final list. Prior to the start of the Gold Cup, he picked up a minor injury and did not appear in the tournament until the final group stage match against Martinique, coming on as a half-time substitute and contributing an assist to Raúl Jiménez for Mexico's second goal in a 3–2 victory. In the final against the United States, during the first half he would bend his left elbow in an apparent injury but managed to play in the second half as well, managing to contribute in Mexico's build up play for the winning goal as they won the tournament.

== Style of play ==
Pizarro is a player with vast experience playing in various positions. He started off in Pachuca as a right-back, and eventually shifted into a highly versatile and multifaceted midfielder, playing as a defensive midfielder, central midfielder, and eventually settling as winger and attacking midfielder. During his time at Guadalajara, manager Matías Almeyda opted at times to use him as a "goal poacher."

He has been described as "A classy operator of the ball, Pizarro can pick a pass, unlock tightest of defenses and has the guile to operate as a number 10. The Mexican star can spark creativity from midfield and add [fluency in the] build-up play in the final third. He is tenacious and hard-working, whilst also possessing the ball retention skills and the intelligence to get into promising goalscoring positions. Not only that, but the Tampico-born star also has a hammer of a right foot that is capable of delivering rockets from long distances. He has the ability to hold the ball in tightest of situations and his wonderful technique allows him to run comfortably with it." Various outlets have described him as a difference maker in critical moments. He also plays as an inverted winger, having the tendency to move to the inside of the pitch as the full-backs move upward so he can thrive.

== Career statistics ==
=== Club ===
As of match played on 21 November 2026

Appearances and goals by club, season and competition
| Club | Season | League | | | National cup (Note: Includes Copa MX, U.S. Open Cup, Greek Cup) | | Continental | | Global | | Other | | Total | |
| Club | Season | Division | Apps | Goals | Apps | Goals | Apps | Goals | Apps | Goals | Apps | Goals | Apps | Goals |
|---|---|---|---|---|---|---|---|---|---|---|---|---|---|---|
| Pachuca | 2012–13 | Liga MX | 16 | 0 | 9 | 1 | — | | — | | — | | 25 | 1 |
| Pachuca | 2013–14 | Liga MX | 39 | 0 | 3 | 0 | — | | — | | — | | 42 | 0 |
| Pachuca | 2014–15 | Liga MX | 35 | 2 | — | | 4 (Note: Appearances in CONCACAF Champions League) | 0 | — | | — | | 39 | 2 |
| Pachuca | 2015–16 | Liga MX | 37 | 6 | 5 (Note: Includes one appearance in Campeón de Campeones) | 1 | — | | — | | — | | 42 | 7 |
| Pachuca | 2016–17 | Liga MX | 7 | 0 | — | | — | | — | | — | | 7 | 0 |
| Pachuca | Total | | 134 | 8 | 17 | 2 | 4 | 0 | — | | — | | 155 | 10 |
| Guadalajara | 2016–17 | Liga MX | 16 | 6 | 2 | 1 | — | | — | | — | | 18 | 7 |
| Guadalajara | 2017–18 | Liga MX | 29 | 7 | 3 | 0 | 8 | 1 | — | | — | | 40 | 8 |
| Guadalajara | Total | | 45 | 13 | 5 | 1 | 8 | 1 | — | | — | | 58 | 15 |
| Monterrey | 2018–19 | Liga MX | 30 | 6 | 2 (Note: Includes one appearance in Supercopa MX) | 0 | 8 | 1 | — | | — | | 40 | 7 |
| Monterrey | 2019–20 | Liga MX | 21 | 2 | — | | — | | 3 (Note: Appearances in FIFA Club World Cup) | 0 | — | | 24 | 2 |
| Monterrey | Total | | 51 | 8 | 2 | 0 | 8 | 1 | 3 | 0 | — | | 64 | 9 |
| Inter Miami | 2020 | MLS | 20 (Note: Includes three appearances and one goal in MLS is Back Tournament group stage and one appearance in MLS Cup playoffs) | 4 | — | | — | | — | | — | | 20 | 4 |
| Inter Miami | 2021 | MLS | 27 | 3 | — | | — | | — | | — | | 27 | 3 |
| Inter Miami | 2023 | MLS | 13 | 0 | 2 | 0 | — | | — | | — | | 15 | 0 |
| Inter Miami | Total | | 60 | 7 | 2 | 0 | — | | — | | — | | 62 | 7 |
| Monterrey (loan) | 2021–22 | Liga MX | 11 | 1 | — | | — | | 2 | 0 | — | | 13 | 1 |
| Monterrey (loan) | 2022–23 | Liga MX | 19 | 0 | — | | — | | — | | — | | 19 | 0 |
| Monterrey (loan) | Total | | 30 | 1 | — | | — | | 2 | 0 | — | | 32 | 1 |
| AEK Athens | 2023–24 | Super League Greece | 16 | 0 | 2 | 0 | 4 (Note: Includes two appearances in UEFA Champions League and two appearances in UEFA Europa League) | 0 | — | | — | | 22 | 0 |
| Mazatlán | 2024–25 | Liga MX | 23 | 0 | — | | — | | — | | — | | 23 | 0 |
| Juárez | 2025–26 | Liga MX | 35 | 4 | — | | — | | — | | 3 (Note: Appearances in Leagues Cup) | 0 | 38 | 4 |
| Pachuca (loan) | 2026–27 | Liga MX | 16 | 0 | — | | — | | — | | 3 | 0 | 19 | 0 |
| Career total | | | 410 | 41 | 28 | 3 | 24 | 2 | 5 | 0 | 6 | 0 | 472 | 46 |

=== International ===
As of 11 June 2022

Appearances and goals by national team and year
| National team | Year | Apps | Goals |
|---|---|---|---|
| Mexico | 2014 | 4 | 0 |
| Mexico | 2016 | 2 | 1 |
| Mexico | 2017 | 6 | 2 |
| Mexico | 2018 | 3 | 0 |
| Mexico | 2019 | 9 (Note: Rodolfo Pizarro additionally played a match against Martinique in 2019, which is not recognized by FIFA.) | 2 |
| Mexico | 2020 | 4 | 0 |
| Mexico | 2021 | 6 | 0 |
| Mexico | 2022 | 3 | 0 |
| Total | | 37 | 5 |

Scores and results list Mexico's goal tally first, score column indicates score after each Pizarro goal.

List of international goals scored by Rodolfo Pizarro
| No. | Date | Venue | Opponent | Score | Result | Competition |
|---|---|---|---|---|---|---|
| 1 | 10 February 2016 | Marlins Park, Miami, United States | Senegal | 2–0 | 2–0 | Friendly |
| 2 | 1 July 2017 | CenturyLink Field, Seattle, United States | Paraguay | 1–0 | 2–1 | Friendly |
| 3 | 20 July 2017 | University of Phoenix Stadium, Glendale, United States | Honduras | 1–0 | 1–0 | 2017 CONCACAF Gold Cup |
| 4 | 5 June 2019 | Mercedes-Benz Stadium, Atlanta, United States | Venezuela | 2–1 | 3–1 | Friendly |
| 5 | 15 October 2019 | Estadio Azteca, Mexico City, Mexico | Panama | 3–1 | 3–1 | 2019–20 CONCACAF Nations League A |

== Honours ==
Pachuca

- Liga MX: Clausura 2016

Guadalajara

- Liga MX: Clausura 2017
- Copa MX: Clausura 2017
- CONCACAF Champions League: 2018

Monterrey

- Liga MX: Apertura 2019
- CONCACAF Champions League: 2019

Mexico U23

- CONCACAF Olympic Qualifying Championship: 2015

Mexico

- CONCACAF Gold Cup: 2019

Individual

- CONCACAF Olympic Qualifying Championship Best XI: 2015
- CONCACAF Champions League Best Young Player: 2018
- CONCACAF Champions League Best XI: 2018
- Liga MX Best XI: Clausura 2019
- MLS All-Star: 2021
