= 2022–23 C.F. Monterrey season =

Monterrey
2022–23 season
- President: Duilio Davino
- Manager: Víctor Manuel Vucetich
- Stadium: Estadio BBVA
- Apertura 2022: 2nd
- Top goalscorer: Rodrigo Aguirre (5 goal)
- Highest home attendance: 52,810 vs UANL (20 August 2022)
Home colours	Away colours	Third colours

The 2022–23 C.F. Monterrey season, commonly referred to as Monterrey, is the oldest active professional team from the northern part of Mexico. The team participated in the Liga MX.

== Players ==
=== Squad Information ===
Players and squad numbers last updated on 4 July 2022. Appearances include all competitions.
Note: Flags indicate national team as has been defined under FIFA eligibility rules. Players may hold more than one non-FIFA nationality.

No.	Nat.	Name	Date of birth (age)	Signed in	Previous club
Goalkeepers
1	(Argentina)	Esteban Andrada	26 January 1991 (age 35)	2021	(Argentina) Boca Juniors
22	(Mexico)	Luis Cárdenas	15 September 1993 (age 33)	2013	(Mexico) Youth System
24	(Mexico)	César Ramos	14 June 2000 (age 26)	2021	(Mexico) Youth System
Defenders
3	(Mexico)	César Montes	24 February 1997 (age 29)	2015	(Mexico) Youth System
6	(Mexico)	Edson Gutiérrez	19 January 1996 (age 30)	2018	(Mexico) Celaya
33	(Colombia)	Stefan Medina	14 June 1992 (age 34)	2017	(Mexico) Pachuca
Midfielders
16	(Paraguay)	Celso Ortiz	26 January 1989 (age 37)	2016	(Netherlands) AZ
17	(Mexico)	Jesús Gallardo	15 August 1994 (age 32)	2018	(Mexico) UNAM
21	(Mexico)	Alfonso González	5 September 1994 (age 32)	2016	(Mexico) Atlas
30	(Mexico)	Rodolfo Pizarro	15 February 1994 (age 32)	2018	(Mexico) Guadalajara
Forwards
7	(Argentina)	Rogelio Funes Mori	5 March 1991 (age 35)	2015	(Turkey) Eskişehirspor
9	(Argentina)	Germán Berterame	13 November 1998 (age 27)	2022	(Mexico) Atlético San Luis
29	(Uruguay)	Rodrigo Aguirre	1 October 1994 (age 32)	2022	(Ecuador) L.D.U. Quito

== Competitions ==
=== Overview ===
Competition	First match	Last match	Starting round	Record							
Competition	First match	Last match	Starting round	Pld	W	D	L	GF	GA	GD	Win %
Apertura 2022	4 July 2022	TBD	Matchday 1	17	10	5	2	29	13	+16	58.82
Clausura 2023	January 2023	TBD	Matchday 1	0	0	0	0	0	0	+0	—
Total				17	10	5	2	29	13	+16	58.82

Last updated: 1 October 2022
Source: Mediotiempo.com

=== Liga MX ===
==== Torneo Apertura ====
===== League table =====
Pos	Team	Pld	W	D	L	GF	GA	GD	Pts	Qualification
1	América	17	12	2	3	37	16	+21	38	Qualification for the quarter-finals
2	Monterrey	17	10	5	2	29	13	+16	35	Qualification for the quarter-finals
3	Santos Laguna	17	10	3	4	38	21	+17	33	Qualification for the quarter-finals
4	Pachuca (C)	17	9	5	3	28	15	+13	32	Qualification for the quarter-finals
5	UANL	17	9	3	5	24	14	+10	30	Qualification for the reclassification

Source: Liga MX
Rules for classification: 1) Points; 2) Goal difference; 3) Number of goals scored; 4) Head-to-head results between tied teams; 5) Number of goals scored away; 6) Highest relegation coefficient; 7) Fair Play points
(C) Champions

===== Results summary =====
Overall								Home						Away					
Pld	W	D	L	GF	GA	GD	Pts	W	D	L	GF	GA	GD	W	D	L	GF	GA	GD
17	10	5	2	29	13	+16	35	5	3	0	14	5	+9	5	2	2	15	8	+7

Last updated: 1 October 2022.
Source: Soccerway

===== Results round by round =====
Round	1	2	3	4	5	6	7	8	9	10	11	12	13	14	15	16	17	18	19
Ground	A	H	A	A	H	A	H	A	A	H	A	A	H	H	A	H	H	A	H
Result	L	W	W	W	W	D	W	W	D	D	L	W	D	W	W	W	D		
Position	13	6	4	1	1	2	2	2	1	1	2	2	2	2	2	2	2	QF	QF

Updated to match(es) played on 1 October 2022. Source: Mediotiempo.com
A = Away; H = Home; W = Win; D = Draw; L = Loss; QF = Quarter-finals

==== Matches ====
The league fixtures were announced on 29 May 2022.

=== Leagues Cup ===
==== West 2 ====
Pos	Team	Pld	W	PW	PL	L	GF	GA	GD	Pts	Qualification	MON	RSL	SEA
1	(Mexico) Monterrey	2	2	0	0	0	7	2	+5	6	Advance to knockout stage	—	3–0	4–2
2	(United States) Real Salt Lake	2	1	0	0	1	3	3	0	3	Advance to knockout stage	—	—	3–0
3	(United States) Seattle Sounders FC	2	0	0	0	2	2	7	−5	0		—	—	—

Source: Leagues Cup
Rules for classification: Tiebreakers

26 July 2023 group	Monterrey (Mexico)	v	(United States) Real Salt Lake	Sandy, Utah
21:30 (19:30 UTC-6)		Report		Stadium: America First Field

30 July 2023 group	Monterrey (Mexico)	v	(United States) Seattle Sounders FC	Seattle
21:00 (18:00 UTC-7)		Report		Stadium: Lumen Field
