= Joao Rojas (footballer, born 1997) =

Ecuadorian footballer

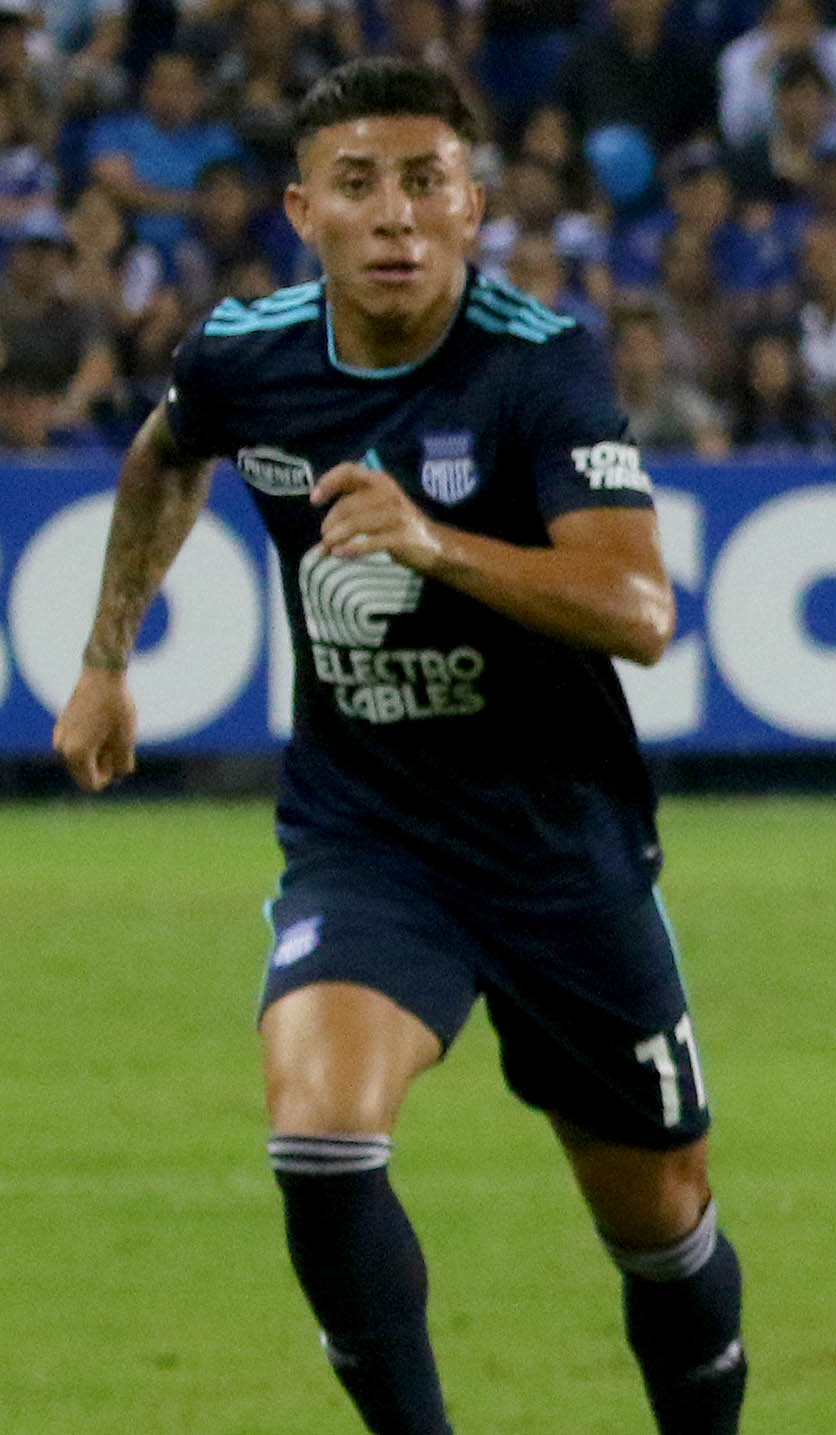
- Rojas with Emelec in 2018

Personal information
- Full name: Joao Joshimar Rojas López
- Date of birth: 16 August 1997 (age 29)
- Place of birth: El Guabo, Ecuador
- Height: 1.72 m (5 ft 8 in)
- Position: Winger

Senior career*
Years	Team	Apps	(Gls)
2015–2016	Aucas	60	(7)
2017–2022	Emelec	116	(21)
2022–2024	Monterrey	15	(2)
2024–	Barcelona SC	8	(1)

International career^{‡}
2017	Ecuador U20	11	(0)
2019–	Ecuador	8	(0)
- * Club domestic league appearances and goals as of 20 August 2025 ‡ National team caps and goals as of 20:54, 25 March 2022 (UTC)

Joao Joshimar Rojas López (born 16 August 1997) is an Ecuadorian professional footballer who plays as a winger for Ecuadorian Serie A club Barcelona S.C. and the Ecuador national team. He made his international debut for Ecuador on 14 November 2019 in a 3–0 win against the Trinidad and Tobago.

== Club career ==
On 22 December 2016, Rojas moved from Aucas to Emelec.

On 30 June 2022, Rojas transferred from Emelec to Monterrey.
