= 2024–25 C.F. Monterrey season =

C.F. Monterrey
2024–25 season
- Chairman: José Antonio Noriega
- Manager: Fernando Ortiz (until 6 August 2024); Martín Demichelis (from 12 August 2024)
- Stadium: Estadio BBVA
- Liga MX Apertura: Regular phase: 5th Final phase: Runners-up
- Liga MX Clausura: Regular phase: 7th Final phase: Quarter-finals
- Leagues Cup: Group stage
- CONCACAF Champions Cup: Round of 16
- FIFA Club World Cup: Round of 16
- Top goalscorer: Germán Berterame; Sergio Canales (10 goals)
- Highest home attendance: Apertura: 52,127 (vs América, 15 December 2024)
- Lowest home attendance: Apertura: 36,441 (vs Juárez, 18 September 2024)
- Average home league attendance: 43,085 (A) 44,821 (C)
- Biggest win: Apertura: Monterrey 5–1 Atlético San Luis (7 December 2024)
- Biggest defeat: Apertura: Monterrey 0–4 Cruz Azul (13 July 2024)
Home colours	Away colours	Third colours

The 2024–25 C.F. Monterrey season was the 80th season in existence and the 29th consecutive season in Liga MX. In addition to the domestic league, the team participated in the CONCACAF Champions Cup, Leagues Cup and FIFA Club World Cup.

== Squad ==
As of 14 September 2024

Note: Flags indicate national team as defined under FIFA eligibility rules; some limited exceptions apply. Players may hold more than one non-FIFA nationality.

No.	Pos.	Nation	Player
1	GK	ARG	Esteban Andrada
3	DF	MEX	Gerardo Arteaga
4	DF	MEX	Víctor Guzmán
5	MF	MEX	Fidel Ambríz
6	DF	MEX	Edson Gutiérrez
7	FW	MEX	Germán Berterame
8	MF	ESP	Óliver Torres
9	FW	USA	Brandon Vázquez
10	MF	ESP	Sergio Canales
14	DF	MEX	Érick Aguirre
15	DF	MEX	Héctor Moreno (Captain)
16	MF	COL	Johan Rojas

No.	Pos.	Nation	Player
17	MF	MEX	Jesús Corona
18	DF	MEX	Axel Grijalva
19	MF	MEX	Jordi Cortizo
20	DF	CHI	Sebastián Vegas
22	GK	MEX	Luis Cárdenas
24	GK	MEX	César Ramos
29	FW	ARG	Lucas Ocampos
30	MF	ARG	Jorge Rodríguez
31	FW	MEX	Roberto de la Rosa (on loan from Pachuca)
32	DF	MEX	Tony Leone
33	DF	COL	Stefan Medina
34	DF	MEX	César Bustos
35	MF	MEX	Pedro Ramírez
93	DF	ESP	Sergio Ramos
204	MF	MEX	Iker Fimbres

=== Out on loan ===
Note: Flags indicate national team as defined under FIFA eligibility rules; some limited exceptions apply. Players may hold more than one non-FIFA nationality.

No.	Pos.	Nation	Player
—	DF	MEX	Orlando Botello (at York United)
—	DF	MEX	Javier Casillas (at Venados)
—	DF	MEX	Christian Franco (at Juárez)
—	DF	MEX	Daniel Parra (at Forge)
—	DF	MEX	Gustavo Sánchez (at Mazatlán)
—	MF	MEX	Alfonso González (at Pachuca)
—	MF	MEX	Víctor López (at Querétaro)

No.	Pos.	Nation	Player
—	MF	MEX	Jaziel Martínez (at Atlético Morelia)
—	MF	MEX	Josué Martínez (at York United)
—	MF	USA	Jacobo Reyes (at New Mexico United)
—	MF	MEX	Michell Rodríguez (at UNAM)
—	MF	MEX	Ángel Zapata (at Sinaloa)
—	FW	MEX	Alí Ávila (at UNAM)

== Transfers ==
=== In ===
Date	Pos.	Player	From	Fee	Ref.
7 June 2024	MF	(Colombia) Johan Rojas	(Colombia) La Equidad	$2,500,000	
8 June 2024	MF	(Spain) Óliver Torres	(Spain) Sevilla FC	Free transfer	
11 June 2024	FW	(Mexico) Roberto de la Rosa	Pachuca	One-year loan	
28 August 2024	MF	(Mexico) Fidel Ambríz	León	$6,000,000	
3 September 2024	FW	(Argentina) Lucas Ocampos	(Spain) Sevilla FC	$8,000,000	
6 February 2025	DF	(Spain) Sergio Ramos		Free	

=== Out ===
Date	Pos.	Player	To	Fee	Ref.
9 June 2024	MF	(Mexico) Omar Govea	Guadalajara	$2,400,000	
10 June 2024	DF	(Mexico) Jesús Gallardo	Toluca	$5,000,000	
30 June 2024	MF	(Mexico) Jonathan González	Juárez	Free transfer	
1 July 2024	MF	(Mexico) Alfonso González	Pachuca	One-year loan	
8 July 2024	MF	(Mexico) Luis Romo	Cruz Azul	$7,000,000	
8 July 2024	FW	(Colombia) Duván Vergara	(Colombia) América de Cali	Free transfer	
14 July 2024	FW	(Uruguay) Rodrigo Aguirre	América	$3,000,000	
19 July 2024	MF	(Mexico) Jaziel Martínez	Atlético Morelia	One-year loan	
15 August 2024	FW	(Argentina) Maximiliano Meza	(Argentina) River Plate	$2,300,000	

== Competitions ==
=== Overview ===
Competition	First match	Last match	Starting round	Final position	Record							
Competition	First match	Last match	Starting round	Final position	Pld	W	D	L	GF	GA	GD	Win %
Liga MX (Apertura)	7 July 2024	15 December 2024	Matchday 1	Runners-up	23	12	4	7	40	29	+11	52.17
Liga MX (Clausura)	11 January 2025	10 May 2025	Matchday 1	Quarter-finals	21	10	4	7	39	29	+10	47.62
Leagues Cup	30 July 2024	3 August 2024	Group stage	Group stage	2	0	1	1	1	3	−2	0.00
CONCACAF Champions Cup	5 February 2025	12 March 2025	First round	Round of 16	4	2	2	0	8	3	+5	50.00
FIFA Club World Cup	17 June 2025		Group stage		3	1	2	0	5	1	+4	33.33
Total					53	25	13	15	93	65	+28	47.17

Last updated: 25 June 2025
Source: Competitions

==== Apertura 2024 ====
Overall								Home						Away					
Pld	W	D	L	GF	GA	GD	Pts	W	D	L	GF	GA	GD	W	D	L	GF	GA	GD
23	12	4	7	40	29	+11	40	7	2	3	23	15	+8	5	2	4	17	14	+3

Last updated: 16 December 2024.

== Apertura 2024 ==
=== League table ===
Pos	Team	Pld	W	D	L	GF	GA	GD	Pts	Qualification
3	Tigres	17	10	4	3	25	15	+10	34	Qualification for the quarter–finals (Note: The first six places in the table will qualify for the Liguilla quarter-finals.)
4	Pumas	17	9	4	4	21	13	+8	31	Qualification for the quarter–finals
5	Monterrey	17	9	4	4	26	19	+7	31	Qualification for the quarter–finals
6	Atlético San Luis	17	9	3	5	27	19	+8	30	Qualification for the quarter–finals
7	Tijuana	17	8	5	4	24	25	−1	29	Qualification for the play-in round (Note: Teams ranked 7th to 10th will qualify for the play-in round.)

Source: Liga MX
Rules for classification: 1) Points; 2) Goal difference; 3) Number of goals scored; 4) Head-to-head results between tied teams; 5) Number of goals scored away; 6) Highest relegation coefficient; 7) Fair Play points

=== Results by round ===
Round	1	2	3	4
Ground	A	H	A	H
Result	W	L	W	W
Position				

Updated to match(es) played on 5 October 2024. Source:
A = Away; H = Home; W = Win; D = Draw; L = Loss

=== Regular phase ===
The match schedule was released on 6 June 2024.

7 July 2024 1	Pachuca	0–1	Monterrey	Pachuca
19:00 UTC−6		Report	Canales 14'	Stadium: Estadio Hidalgo; Attendance: 18,262; Referee: Ismael Rosario López

13 July 2024 2	Monterrey	0–4	Cruz Azul	Guadalupe
21:10 UTC−6		Report	Rivero 14'; Rotondi 28' (pen.), 50'; Sepúlveda 76'	Stadium: Estadio BBVA; Attendance: 45,957; Referee: Maximiliano Quintero Hernández

17 July 2024 3	Necaxa	0–1	Monterrey	Aguascalientes
19:00 UTC−6	Arce Jr. (yellow card) 62'; Garnica (yellow card) 79' (red card) 80'; Oliveros (yellow card) 80'	Report	Cortizo 57'; Canales (yellow card) 79'	Stadium: Estadio Victoria; Referee: Jesús Rafael López

20 July 2024 4	Monterrey	2–1	Querétaro	Guadalupe
19:00 UTC−6	Berterame 29'; Guzmán (yellow card) 34'; Rojas 66'	Report	Lértora (yellow card) 33'; Manzanarez (yellow card) 37'; Río (yellow card) 78'; López 88'	Stadium: Estadio BBVA; Attendance: 39,932; Referee: Víctor Alfonso Cáceres

16 August 2024 16	Puebla	1–2	Monterrey	Puebla
19:00 UTC−6	Orona (yellow card) 38'; Ferrareis (yellow card) 59'; Ormeño 81'	Report	Cortizo (yellow card) 26'; Berterame 36'; Canales 55'; Andrada (yellow card) 83'; Medina (yellow card) 90+4'	Stadium: Estadio Cuauhtémoc; Attendance: 9,000; Referee: Salvador Pérez Villalobos

23 August 2024 5	Tijuana	2–2	Monterrey	Tijuana
20:05 UTC−7	Rivera 35' (pen.); Zúñiga 90+8', (yellow card) 90+10'	Report	Berterame 28'; Vázquez 43'; Rodríguez (yellow card) 76'; Andrada (yellow card) 83'	Stadium: Estadio Caliente; Attendance: 23,333; Referee: César Arturo Ramos

31 August 2024 6	Monterrey	1–2	Toluca	Guadalupe
19:00 UTC−6	Vázquez 54' (pen.); Medina (yellow card) 90+8'	Report	Gallardo 6'; Ruiz (yellow card) 59'; Baeza (yellow card) 80'; Violante 87'	Stadium: Estadio BBVA; Attendance: 43,150; Referee: Fernando Guerrero Ramírez

14 September 2024 7	Santos Laguna	0–2	Monterrey	Torreón
21:00 UTC−6	H. Rodríguez (yellow card) 34'	Report	Vázquez 4'; J. Rodríguez (yellow card) 30'; Ambríz (yellow card) 81'; Berterame 90+5'	Stadium: Estadio Corona; Attendance: 11,241; Referee: Erick Yair Miranda

18 September 2024 8	Monterrey	3–2	Juárez	Guadalupe
21:00 UTC−6	Vegas (yellow card) 3'; Berterame 11', (red card) 90+3'; Canales (yellow card) 36', (goal) 79', 85' (pen.)	Report	Valoyes (yellow card) 22', (goal) 59'; Estupiñan 47', (yellow card) 77'; Díaz (yellow card) 65'; Villalpando (yellow card) 77'; Ortega (yellow card) 81'	Stadium: Estadio BBVA; Attendance: 36,441; Referee: Salvador Pérez Villalobos

21 September 2024 9	Monterrey	0–0	Mazatlán	Guadalupe
19:00 UTC−6	Vegas (red card) 6'; Andrada (yellow card) 69'; Rojas (yellow card) 90+7'	Report	Torres (yellow card) 22'; Franco (yellow card) 38'; Meraz (yellow card) 57'	Stadium: Estadio BBVA; Attendance: 43,721; Referee: Ismael Rosario López

28 September 2024 10	Guadalajara	1–1	Monterrey	Zapopan
21:05 UTC−6	Briseño (yellow card) 10'; Marín 28'; Rangel (yellow card) 88'	Report	Arteaga (yellow card) 48'; Moreno (yellow card) 75'; Corona (yellow card) 79', (goal) 88'; Rojas (yellow card) 89'; Rodríguez (yellow card) 90+2'; Andrada (yellow card) 90+8'	Stadium: Estadio Akron; Attendance: 36,043; Referee: Jesús Rafael López

5 October 2024 11	Atlético San Luis	1–0	Monterrey	San Luis Potosí
17:00 UTC−6	Chávez 41', (yellow card) 52'; Dourado (yellow card) 73'; Guillén (yellow card) 83'	Report		Stadium: Estadio Alfonso Lastras; Attendance: 11,214; Referee: Victor Alfonso Cáceres

19 October 2024 12	Monterrey	4–2	Tigres	Guadalupe
21:10 UTC−6	Fimbres 5', 66', (yellow card) 37'; Canales 26'; Ocampos 36' (pen.)	Report	Pizarro 44'; Gignac 45+9' (pen.)	Stadium: Estadio BBVA; Attendance: 51,983; Referee: Oscar García

23 October 2024 13	Monterrey	0–0	UNAM	Guadalupe
19:00 UTC−6		Report		Stadium: Estadio BBVA; Attendance: 40,959; Referee: Adonai González Escobedo

27 October 2024 14	América	2–1	Monterrey	Mexico City
20:00 UTC−6	B. Rodríguez 49'; Zendejas (yellow card) 81'; Fidalgo 89'	Report	Medina (yellow card) 62'; Ambríz (yellow card) 77'; Moreno (yellow card) 85'; Cortizo 87'	Stadium: Estadio Ciudad de los Deportes; Attendance: 23,810; Referee: Daniel Quintero Huitrón

2 November 2024 15	Monterrey	4–0	Atlas	Guadalupe
19:05 UTC−6	Canales 6', 40', (yellow card) 26'; Berterame 13'; Torres (yellow card) 16'; Rojas 68'	Report	Márquez (yellow card) 22'; Dória (yellow card) 71'	Stadium: Estadio BBVA; Attendance: 40,381; Referee: Fernando Gomez

10 November 2024 17	Monterrey	2–1	León	Guadalupe
19:00 UTC−6	Gutiérrez 31'; Canales 77' (pen.); Ocampos (red card) 85'	Report	Mendoza 63', (red card) 90+2'; Guerra (red card) 85'	Stadium: Estadio BBVA; Attendance: 41,874; Referee: César Arturo Ramos

=== Final phase ===
==== Quarter-finals ====
28 November 2024 First leg	Monterrey	1–0	UNAM	Guadalupe
21:10 UTC−6	Torres (yellow card) 37'; Medina (yellow card) 70'; Canales 90' (pen.)	Report	Silva (yellow card) 53'; Duarte (yellow card) 75'; Monroy (yellow card) 81'; Ergas (yellow card) 87'; Martínez (yellow card) 89'	Stadium: Estadio BBVA; Attendance: 37,379; Referee: Daniel Quintero Huitrón

1 December 2024 Second leg	UNAM	3–5 (3–6 agg.)	Monterrey	Mexico City
12:00 UTC−6	Silva (yellow card) 6'; Martínez 36', 87', (yellow card) 64'; Pussetto 66'; Duarte (yellow card) 90+6'; Caicedo (yellow card) 90+8'	Report	Berterame 32', 73'; Ocampos 56'; Arteaga 79'; Rodríguez (yellow card) 84'; Aguirre (yellow card) 88'; Torres 90+3'; Vázquez (yellow card) 90+6'	Stadium: Estadio Olímpico Universitario; Attendance: 37,439; Referee: Marco Antonio Ortiz

==== Semi-finals ====
4 December 2024 First leg	Atlético San Luis	2–1	Monterrey	San Luis Potosí
21:00 UTC−6	Bonatini 30'; Chávez 80'	Report	Berterame 66'	Stadium: Estadio Alfonso Lastras; Attendance: 22,803; Referee: Fernando Hernández Gómez

7 December 2024 Second leg	Monterrey	5–1 (6–3 agg.)	Atlético San Luis	Guadalupe
20:00 UTC−6	Torres 47', 85'; Berterame 52'; Guillén 82' (o.g.); Vázquez 90+1'	Report	Sánchez (yellow card) 40'; Salles-Lamonge 75' (pen.); Sanabria (yellow card) 90+2'	Stadium: Estadio BBVA; Attendance: 48,606; Referee: Marco Antonio Ortiz

==== Final ====
12 December 2024 First leg	América	2–1	Monterrey	Puebla
20:00 UTC−6	Álvarez 39'; Zendejas 49'; dos Santos (yellow card) 59'; Juárez (yellow card) 81'	Report	Canales 35'; Torres (yellow card) 73'	Stadium: Estadio Cuauhtémoc; Attendance: 36,933; Referee: Victor Alfonso Cáceres

15 December 2024 Second leg	Monterrey	1–1 (2–3 agg.)	América	Guadalupe
19:00 UTC−6	Berterame (yellow card) 17'; Rojas 85'	Report	Sánchez 24'; Zendejas (yellow card) 85'	Stadium: Estadio BBVA; Attendance: 52,127; Referee: César Arturo Ramos

== Clausura 2025 ==
=== League table ===
Pos	Team	Pld	W	D	L	GF	GA	GD	Pts	Qualification
5	Necaxa	17	10	1	6	36	29	+7	31	Qualification for the quarter–finals (Note: The first six places in the table will qualify for the Liguilla quarter-finals.)
6	León	17	9	3	5	24	21	+3	30	Qualification for the quarter–finals
7	Monterrey	17	8	4	5	32	23	+9	28	Qualification for the play-in round (Note: Teams ranked 7th to 10th will qualify for the play-in round.)
8	Pachuca	17	8	4	5	29	23	+6	28	Qualification for the play-in round
9	Juárez	17	6	6	5	16	21	−5	24	Qualification for the play-in round

Updated to match(es) played on 20 April 2025. Source: Liga MX
Rules for classification: 1) Points; 2) Goal difference; 3) Number of goals scored; 4) Head-to-head results between tied teams; 5) Number of goals scored away; 6) Highest relegation coefficient; 7) Fair Play points

=== Regular phase ===
The match schedule was released on 15 December 2024.

12 January 2025 1	Monterrey	1–1	Puebla	Guadalupe
19:00 UTC−6	Rodríguez 38'	Report	Waller (yellow card) 76'; Gustavo Ferrareis 86'; Angulo (yellow card) 90+4'; Gularte (yellow card) 90+6'	Stadium: Estadio BBVA; Attendance: 37,244; Referee: (Mexico) Luis Alfredo García

18 January 2025 2	Toluca	1–1	Monterrey	Toluca
21:00 UTC−6	Helinho 11'; Barbosa (yellow card) 83'	Report	Sergio Canales 47'; Moreno (yellow card) 66'	Stadium: Estadio Nemesio Díez; Attendance: 27,273; Referee: (Mexico) Fernando Guerrero

25 January 2025 3	Monterrey	2–3	Pachuca	Guadalupe
19:00 UTC−6	Sergio Canales 28' (pen.); Berterame 73'	Report	Barreto (yellow card) 35'; Idrissi 41'; Rondón 62' (pen.); John Kennedy 69'	Stadium: Estadio BBVA; Attendance: 43,072; Referee: (Mexico) Guillermo Pacheco

29 January 2025 4	Atlas	3–3	Monterrey	Guadalajara
19:00 UTC−6	Márquez 5' 40'; Rocha (yellow card) 52'; Dória 89'	Report	Chávez (yellow card) 23' (goal) 66'; Óliver Torres 37'; Medina (yellow card) 61'; Alvarado 74'; Rodríguez (yellow card) 76'	Stadium: Estadio Jalisco; Attendance: 18,099; Referee: (Mexico) Maximiliano Quintero

1 February 2025 5	Monterrey	1–0	Necaxa	Guadalupe
19:00 UTC−6	Ambríz 45'; Sergio Canales (yellow card) 45+4'; Aguirre (yellow card) 82'	Report	Cambindo (yellow card) 16'; de Buen (yellow card) 38'; Monreal (yellow card) 45+3'	Stadium: Estadio BBVA; Attendance: 44,471; Referee: (Mexico) Marco Ortíz

8 February 2025 6	Juárez	2–1	Monterrey	Ciudad Juárez
21:00 UTC−7	Murillo 35'; Mosquera (yellow card) 40'; Torres (yellow card) 54'; Jurado (yellow card) 58'; Estupiñán 62' (yellow card) 66'; García (yellow card) 67'	Report	Aguirre (yellow card) 17'; Deossa (yellow card) 80'; Cortizo (yellow card) 90+1'; Sergio Canales 90+5'	Stadium: Estadio Olímpico Benito Juárez; Attendance: 8,785; Referee: (Mexico) Luis Enrique Santander

16 February 2025 7	Querétaro	2–4	Monterrey	Querétaro
17:00 UTC−6	Gómez (yellow card) 57' (red card) 69'; Canale 68'; Mendoza (yellow card) 75'; Adonis Stalin Preciado Quintero 90'	Report	Corona 2'; Chávez 11' (yellow card) 90'; Berterame 25'; Medina (yellow card) 66'; Óliver Torres 76'	Stadium: Estadio Corregidora; Attendance: 17,494; Referee: (Mexico) Fernando Hernández

22 February 2025 8	Monterrey	3–1	Atlético San Luis	Guadalupe
19:00 UTC−6	Berterame 23' 78'; Óliver Torres 33'	Report	Rodrigo Dourado (yellow card) 74'; Vitinho 87'; Águila (yellow card) 90+1'	Stadium: Estadio BBVA; Attendance: 50,023; Referee: (Mexico) Daniel Quintero

25 February 2025 9	Mazatlán	1–0	Monterrey	Mazatlán
21:00 UTC−6	Merolla (yellow card) 22'; Díaz (yellow card) 33'; Duarte 39'; Sánchez (yellow card) 56'; Sierra (yellow card) 56'	Report	Chávez (yellow card) 55'; Reyes (yellow card) 64'	Stadium: Estadio El Encanto; Attendance: 10,473; Referee: (Mexico) Abraham Quirarte

2 March 2025 10	Monterrey	v	Santos Laguna	Guadalupe
20:00 UTC−6				Stadium: Estadio BBVA

8 March 2025 11	Cruz Azul	v	Monterrey
19:00 UTC−6

16 March 2025 12	UNAM	v	Monterrey	Mexico City
18:00 UTC−6				Stadium: Estadio Olímpico Universitario

29 March 2025 13	Monterrey	v	Tijuana	Guadalupe
21:00 UTC−6				Stadium: Estadio BBVA

5 April 2025 14	Monterrey	v	Guadalajara	Guadalupe
19:00 UTC−6				Stadium: Estadio BBVA

12 April 2025 15	Tigres	v	Monterrey	San Nicolás de los Garza
19:00 UTC−6				Attendance: Estadio Universitario

16 April 2025 16	Monterrey	v	América	Guadalupe
19:00 UTC−6				Stadium: Estadio BBVA

20 April 2025 17	León	v	Monterrey	León
19:00 UTC−6				Stadium: Estadio León

== CONCACAF Champions Cup ==
=== First round ===
5 February 2025 First leg	Forge FC (Canada)	0–2	(Mexico) Monterrey	Hamilton, Canada
20:00 UTC−5		Report	Deossa 53'; Cortizo 66'; Chávez (yellow card) 81'; Soto (yellow card) 89'	Stadium: Tim Hortons Field; Attendance: 5,413; Referee: Lukasz Szpala

11 February 2025 Second leg	Monterrey (Mexico)	3–0 (5–0 agg.)	(Canada) Forge FC	Guadalupe
19:00 UTC−6	Berterame 19', 58'; Deossa (yellow card) 31'; Cortizo 48'; Medina (yellow card) 81'; Rodríguez (yellow card) 83'	Report	Borges (yellow card) 18'; Choinière (yellow card) 70'	Stadium: Estadio BBVA; Referee: Walter Lopez

=== Round of 16 ===
5 March 2025 First leg	Vancouver Whitecaps (Canada)	1–1	(Mexico) Monterrey	Vancouver, Canada
19:30 UTC−8	Halbouni 86'	Report	De la Rosa 25'	Stadium: Estadio Ricardo Saprissa Aymá or BC Place; Attendance: 9,613; Referee: Kwinsi Williams (Trinidad and Tobago)

12 March 2025 Second leg	Monterrey (Mexico)	2–2 (3–3 (a) agg.)	(Canada) Vancouver Whitecaps	Torreón
18:30 UTC−6	Canales 4'; Ramos 90+7' (pen.)	Report	Ocampo 57'; White 78'	Stadium: Estadio Corona (Note: Due to a Shakira concert at Estadio BBVA, Monterrey played their home Round of 16 match in Torreón.); Attendance: 10,420

== Leagues Cup ==
=== Group stage ===
Pos	Team	Pld	W	PW	PL	L	GF	GA	GD	Pts	Qualification	AUS	UNM	MTY
1	(United States Soccer Federation) Austin FC	2	2	0	0	0	5	2	+3	6	Advance to knockout stage	—	—	—
2	(Mexican Football Federation) UNAM	2	0	1	0	1	3	4	−1	2	Advance to knockout stage	2–3	—	—
3	(Mexican Football Federation) Monterrey	2	0	0	1	1	1	3	−2	1		0–2	1–1	—

Source: Leagues Cup
Rules for classification: Tiebreakers

30 July 2024 1	Monterrey (Mexico)	0–2	(United States) Austin FC	Austin, United States
20:00 UTC−5		Report	Obrian 61'; Pereira 79'	Stadium: Q2 Stadium; Referee: Daniel Quintero (Mexico)

3 August 2024 2	Monterrey (Mexico)	1–1 (0–3 p)	(Mexico) UNAM	Austin, United States
21:00 UTC−5	Corona 53'	Report	Funes Mori 80'	Stadium: Q2 Stadium; Referee: Walter López (Guatemala)
	Penalties
	Vázquez (penalty missed); Medina (penalty missed); Rojas (penalty missed)		(penalty missed) Quispe; (penalty scored) Huerta; (penalty scored) Nathan; (penalty scored) Ergas

== FIFA Club World Cup ==
=== Group stage ===
The group stage draw took place on 5 December 2024.

Pos	Team	Pld	W	D	L	GF	GA	GD	Pts	Qualification
1	(Italy) Inter Milan	3	2	1	0	5	2	+3	7	Advance to knockout stage
2	(Mexico) Monterrey	3	1	2	0	5	1	+4	5	Advance to knockout stage
3	(Argentina) River Plate	3	1	1	1	3	3	0	4	
4	(Japan) Urawa Red Diamonds	3	0	0	3	2	9	−7	0	

Source: FIFA
Rules for classification: Group stage tiebreakers

17 June 2025 1	Monterrey (Mexico)	1–1	(Italy) Inter Milan	Pasadena, United States
6:00 pm PDT	Ramos 25'; Rodríguez (yellow card) 45'	Report	L. Martínez 42', (yellow card) 90+5'; Asllani (yellow card) 61'; Barella (yellow card) 88'	Stadium: Rose Bowl; Attendance: 40,311; Referee: Wilton Sampaio (Brazil)

21 June 2025 2	River Plate (Argentina)	0–0	(Mexico) Monterrey	Pasadena, United States
6:00 pm PDT	Pérez (yellow card) 17'; Galoppo (yellow card) 56'; Meza (yellow card) 63'	Report	Rodríguez (yellow card) 19'; Medina (yellow card) 66'; Aguirre (yellow card) 90'; Alvarado (yellow card) 90'; Ambríz (yellow card) 90+2'	Stadium: Rose Bowl; Attendance: 57,393; Referee: Slavko Vinčić (Slovenia)

25 June 2025 3	Urawa Red Diamonds (Japan)	0–4	(Mexico) Monterrey	Pasadena, United States
6:00 pm PDT		Report	Deossa 30'; Berterame 34', 90+7'; Corona 39'	Stadium: Rose Bowl; Attendance: 14,312; Referee: Felix Zwayer (Germany)

=== Knock-out stage ===
1 July 2025 Round of 16	Borussia Dortmund (Germany)	2–1	(Mexico) Monterrey	Atlanta, United States
9:00 pm EDT	Guirassy 14', 24', (yellow card) 90+3'; Bellingham (yellow card) 28'	Report	Berterame 48'	Stadium: Mercedes-Benz Stadium; Attendance: 31,442; Referee: Facundo Tello (Argentina)
