= 2025 FIFA Club World Cup Group E =

Soccer tournament group stage

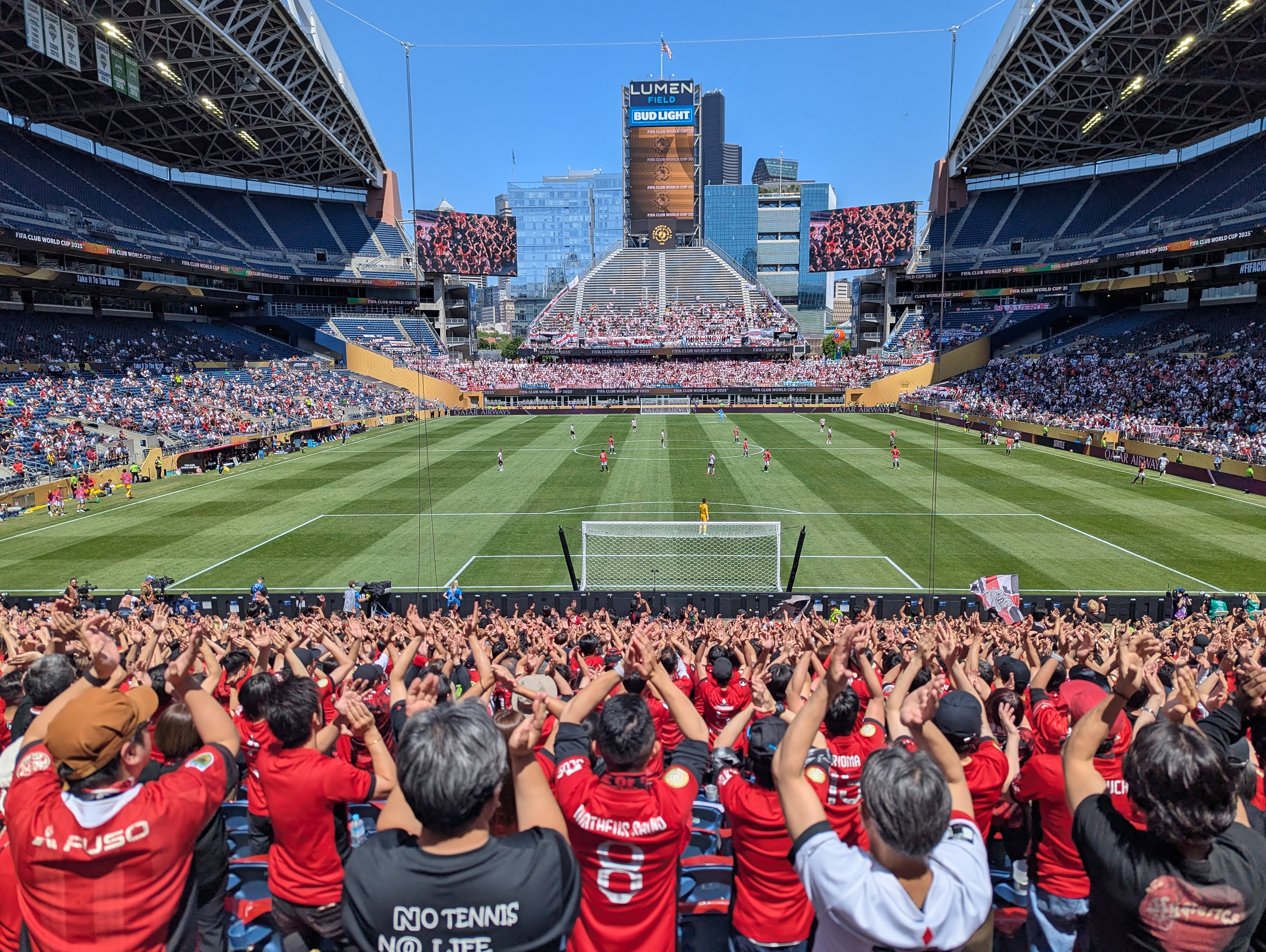
A Group E match between River Plate and Urawa Red Diamonds at Lumen Field in Seattle

Group E was one of eight groups in the 2025 FIFA Club World Cup, an international club soccer tournament hosted in the United States and organized by FIFA. It comprised four teams: River Plate of Argentina; Urawa Red Diamonds of Japan; Monterrey of Mexico; and Inter Milan of Italy. Teams qualified by winning the respective continental club championships of their confederation or through a ranking of their performance in competitions. Only two clubs per country were allowed to qualify unless three or four won their respective continental club championship. The 2025 edition of the FIFA Club World Cup was the first in the tournament's history to be played under its quadrennial format with 32 teams. The group's matches began on June 17 and concluded on June 25.

== Teams ==
The four teams in Group E were decided by the FIFA Club World Cup draw held by FIFA on December 5, 2024, in the Miami area. The 32 participants were divided into four pots based on their confederation and ranking within FIFA's club ranking system. Each of the eight groups would receive one team from each pot. Teams from the same confederation could not be drawn into the same group except for those from UEFA, which had twelve slots; teams from the same national association were not able to be drawn into the same group.

2025 FIFA Club World Cup Group E draw
Draw position	Team	Association	Pot	Confederation	Method of qualification	Date of qualification	Appearance	Last appearance	Previous best performance
E1	River Plate	Argentina	1	CONMEBOL	CONMEBOL four-year ranking (1st among eligible)	May 14, 2024	3rd	2018	Runners-up (2015)
E2	Urawa Red Diamonds	Japan	4	AFC	Winners of the 2022 AFC Champions League	May 6, 2023	4th	2023	Third place (2007)
E3	Monterrey	Mexico	3	CONCACAF	Winners of the 2021 CONCACAF Champions League	March 14, 2023 (Note: Qualification was confirmed on this date by FIFA.)	6th	2021	Third place (2012, 2019)
E4	Inter Milan	Italy	2	UEFA	UEFA four-year ranking (4th among eligible)	December 17, 2023	2nd	2010	Winners (2010)

== Standings ==
Pos	Team	Pld	W	D	L	GF	GA	GD	Pts	Qualification
1	(Italy) Inter Milan	3	2	1	0	5	2	+3	7	Advance to knockout stage
2	(Mexico) Monterrey	3	1	2	0	5	1	+4	5	Advance to knockout stage
3	(Argentina) River Plate	3	1	1	1	3	3	0	4	
4	(Japan) Urawa Red Diamonds	3	0	0	3	2	9	−7	0	

Source: FIFA
Rules for classification: Group stage tiebreakers

In the round of 16:

- The winners of Group E, Inter Milan, advanced to play the runners-up of Group F, Fluminense.
- The runners-up of Group E, Monterrey, advanced to play the winners of Group F, Borussia Dortmund.

== Matches ==
Matches took place from June 17 to 25. All times listed are local.

=== River Plate vs Urawa Red Diamonds ===
June 17, 2025
12:00 pm PDT

River Plate (Argentina)	3–1	(Japan) Urawa Red Diamonds
Colidio 12'; Driussi 48'; Meza 73'	Report	Matsuo 58' (pen.)

Lumen Field, Seattle
Attendance: 11,974
Referee: Felix Zwayer (Germany)

River Plate	Urawa Red Diamonds

GK	1	(Argentina) Franco Armani (c)
RB	4	(Argentina) Gonzalo Montiel
CB	6	(Argentina) Germán Pezzella	(yellow card) 59'
CB	28	(Argentina) Lucas Martínez Quarta
LB	21	(Argentina) Marcos Acuña	(yellow card) 58'	(substituted off) 88'
DM	24	(Argentina) Enzo Pérez	(yellow card) 24'	(substituted off) 46'
CM	26	(Argentina) Ignacio Fernández		(substituted off) 46'
CM	22	(Colombia) Kevin Castaño
RF	30	(Argentina) Franco Mastantuono
CF	15	(Argentina) Sebastián Driussi		(substituted off) 50'
LF	11	(Argentina) Facundo Colidio		(substituted off) 74'
Substitutions:
MF	8	(Argentina) Maximiliano Meza		(substituted on) 46'
MF	34	(Argentina) Giuliano Galoppo	(yellow card) 90+2'	(substituted on) 46'
FW	9	(Colombia) Miguel Borja		(substituted on) 50'
MF	18	(Argentina) Pity Martínez		(substituted on) 74'
DF	20	(Argentina) Milton Casco		(substituted on) 88'
Manager:
(Argentina) Marcelo Gallardo

GK	1	(Japan) Shūsaku Nishikawa
RB	4	(Japan) Hirokazu Ishihara
CB	3	(Brazil) Danilo Boza
CB	5	(Norway) Marius Høibråten (c)
LB	88	(Japan) Yōichi Naganuma		(substituted off) 80'
CM	11	(Sweden) Samuel Gustafson	(yellow card) 34'	(substituted off) 87'
CM	25	(Japan) Kaito Yasui		(substituted off) 80'
RW	77	(Japan) Takurō Kaneko		(substituted off) 71'
AM	8	(Brazil) Matheus Sávio		(substituted off) 71'
LW	13	(Japan) Ryōma Watanabe	(yellow card) 87'	(substituted off) 87'
CF	24	(Japan) Yūsuke Matsuo
Substitutions:
FW	12	(Brazil) Thiago Santana		(substituted on) 71'
MF	14	(Japan) Takahiro Sekine		(substituted on) 71'
DF	26	(Japan) Takuya Ogiwara		(substituted on) 80'
MF	6	(Japan) Taishi Matsumoto		(substituted on) 80'
MF	9	(Japan) Genki Haraguchi		(substituted on) 87'
Manager:
(Poland) Maciej Skorża

Man of the Match:
Facundo Colidio (River Plate)

Assistant referees:
Robert Kempter (Germany)
Christian Dietz (Germany)
Fourth official:
Campbell-Kirk Kawana-Waugh (New Zealand)
Video assistant referee:
Bastian Dankert (Germany)
Assistant video assistant referee:
Ivan Bebek (Croatia)
Support video assistant referee:
Hamza Al-Fariq (Morocco)

=== Monterrey vs Inter Milan ===
June 17, 2025
6:00 pm PDT

Monterrey (Mexico)	1–1	(Italy) Inter Milan
Ramos 25'	Report	L. Martínez 42'

Rose Bowl, Pasadena
Attendance: 40,311
Referee: Wilton Sampaio (Brazil)

Monterrey	Inter Milan

GK	1	(Argentina) Esteban Andrada
CB	33	(Colombia) Stefan Medina
CB	93	(Spain) Sergio Ramos (c)
CB	4	(Mexico) Víctor Guzmán
RM	2	(Mexico) Ricardo Chávez		(substituted off) 58'
CM	10	(Spain) Sergio Canales		(substituted off) 89'
CM	30	(Argentina) Jorge Rodríguez	(yellow card) 45'
CM	8	(Spain) Óliver Torres		(substituted off) 58'
LM	3	(Mexico) Gerardo Arteaga
CF	7	(Mexico) Germán Berterame		(substituted off) 78'
CF	29	(Argentina) Lucas Ocampos		(substituted off) 89'
Substitutions:
DF	14	(Mexico) Érick Aguirre		(substituted on) 58'
MF	6	(Colombia) Nelson Deossa		(substituted on) 58'
MF	5	(Mexico) Fidel Ambríz		(substituted on) 78'
MF	19	(Mexico) Jordi Cortizo		(substituted on) 89'
FW	16	(Colombia) Johan Rojas		(substituted on) 89'
Manager:
(Spain) Domènec Torrent

GK	1	(Switzerland) Yann Sommer
CB	28	(France) Benjamin Pavard		(substituted off) 58'
CB	15	(Italy) Francesco Acerbi
CB	95	(Italy) Alessandro Bastoni
RM	36	(Italy) Matteo Darmian
CM	23	(Italy) Nicolò Barella	(yellow card) 88'
CM	21	(Albania) Kristjan Asllani	(yellow card) 61'	(substituted off) 68'
CM	22	(Armenia) Henrikh Mkhitaryan		(substituted off) 78'
LM	30	(Brazil) Carlos Augusto		(substituted off) 68'
CF	10	(Argentina) Lautaro Martínez (c)	(yellow card) 90+6'
CF	70	(Italy) Sebastiano Esposito		(substituted off) 58'
Substitutions:
MF	11	(Brazil) Luis Henrique		(substituted on) 58'
FW	9	(France) Marcus Thuram		(substituted on) 58'
DF	32	(Italy) Federico Dimarco		(substituted on) 68'
MF	8	(Croatia) Petar Sučić		(substituted on) 68'
MF	59	(Poland) Nicola Zalewski		(substituted on) 78'
Manager:
(Romania) Cristian Chivu

Man of the Match:
Sergio Ramos (Monterrey)

Assistant referees:
Bruno Boschilia (Brazil)
Bruno Pires (Brazil)
Fourth official:
Gustavo Tejera (Uruguay)
Video assistant referee:
Nicolás Gallo (Colombia)
Assistant video assistant referee:
Juan Lara (Chile)
Support video assistant referee:
Alejandro Hernández Hernández (Spain)

=== Inter Milan vs Urawa Red Diamonds ===
June 21, 2025
12:00 pm PDT

Inter Milan (Italy)	2–1	(Japan) Urawa Red Diamonds
L. Martínez 78'; Carboni 90+2'	Report	Watanabe 11'

Lumen Field, Seattle
Attendance: 25,090
Referee: Dahane Beida (Mauritania)

Inter Milan	Urawa Red Diamonds

GK	1	(Switzerland) Yann Sommer
CB	36	(Italy) Matteo Darmian
CB	6	(Netherlands) Stefan de Vrij
CB	30	(Brazil) Carlos Augusto
RM	11	(Brazil) Luis Henrique	(substituted off) 85'
CM	21	(Albania) Kristjan Asllani	(substituted off) 72'
CM	23	(Italy) Nicolò Barella
LM	32	(Italy) Federico Dimarco	(substituted off) 72'
RF	70	(Italy) Sebastiano Esposito	(substituted off) 46'
CF	10	(Argentina) Lautaro Martínez (c)
LF	59	(Poland) Nicola Zalewski	(substituted off) 46'
Substitutions:
MF	22	(Armenia) Henrikh Mkhitaryan	(substituted on) 46'
FW	94	(Italy) Pio Esposito	(substituted on) 46'
FW	45	(Argentina) Valentín Carboni	(substituted on) 72'
DF	95	(Italy) Alessandro Bastoni	(substituted on) 72'
MF	8	(Croatia) Petar Sučić	(substituted on) 85'
Manager:
(Romania) Cristian Chivu

GK	1	(Japan) Shūsaku Nishikawa	(yellow card) 61'
RB	4	(Japan) Hirokazu Ishihara
CB	3	(Brazil) Danilo Boza
CB	5	(Norway) Marius Høibråten (c)
LB	88	(Japan) Yōichi Naganuma		(substituted off) 87'
CM	25	(Japan) Kaito Yasui
CM	11	(Sweden) Samuel Gustafson		(substituted off) 87'
RW	77	(Japan) Takurō Kaneko		(substituted off) 66'
AM	8	(Brazil) Matheus Sávio		(substituted off) 79'
LW	13	(Japan) Ryōma Watanabe
CF	24	(Japan) Yūsuke Matsuo		(substituted off) 79'
Substitutions:
MF	14	(Japan) Takahiro Sekine	(yellow card) 67'	(substituted on) 66'
MF	6	(Japan) Taishi Matsumoto		(substituted on) 79'
FW	12	(Brazil) Thiago Santana	(yellow card) 80'	(substituted on) 79'
MF	9	(Japan) Genki Haraguchi		(substituted on) 87'
DF	26	(Japan) Takuya Ogiwara		(substituted on) 87'
Manager:
(Poland) Maciej Skorża

Man of the Match:
Ryōma Watanabe (Urawa Red Diamonds)

Assistant referees:
Jerson Emiliano dos Santos (Angola)
Stephen Yiembe (Kenya)
Fourth official:
Campbell-Kirk Kawana-Waugh (New Zealand)
Video assistant referee:
Hamza Al-Fariq (Morocco)
Assistant video assistant referee:
Juan Soto (Venezuela)
Support video assistant referee:
Bastian Dankert (Germany)

=== River Plate vs Monterrey ===
June 21, 2025
6:00 pm PDT

River Plate (Argentina)	0–0	(Mexico) Monterrey
	Report

Rose Bowl, Pasadena
Attendance: 57,393
Referee: Slavko Vinčić (Slovenia)

River Plate	Monterrey

GK	1	(Argentina) Franco Armani (c)
RB	4	(Argentina) Gonzalo Montiel
CB	28	(Argentina) Lucas Martínez Quarta
CB	17	(Chile) Paulo Díaz
LB	21	(Argentina) Marcos Acuña
DM	24	(Argentina) Enzo Pérez	(yellow card) 17'	(substituted off) 84'
CM	22	(Colombia) Kevin Castaño	(yellow card) 28' (yellow-red card) 90+1'
CM	34	(Argentina) Giuliano Galoppo	(yellow card) 56'	(substituted off) 71'
RF	30	(Argentina) Franco Mastantuono		(substituted off) 84'
CF	11	(Argentina) Facundo Colidio
LF	8	(Argentina) Maximiliano Meza	(yellow card) 63'	(substituted off) 71'
Substitutions:
MF	26	(Argentina) Ignacio Fernández		(substituted on) 71'
FW	9	(Colombia) Miguel Borja		(substituted on) 71'
MF	5	(Argentina) Matías Kranevitter		(substituted on) 84'
MF	18	(Argentina) Pity Martínez		(substituted on) 84'
Manager:
(Argentina) Marcelo Gallardo

GK	1	(Argentina) Esteban Andrada
RB	14	(Mexico) Érick Aguirre	(yellow card) 90'
CB	33	(Colombia) Stefan Medina	(yellow card) 66'
CB	93	(Spain) Sergio Ramos (c)
LB	3	(Mexico) Gerardo Arteaga
DM	30	(Argentina) Jorge Rodríguez	(yellow card) 19'	(substituted off) 79'
CM	6	(Colombia) Nelson Deossa
CM	10	(Spain) Sergio Canales		(substituted off) 88'
RF	17	(Mexico) Jesús Manuel Corona		(substituted off) 64'
CF	7	(Mexico) Germán Berterame		(substituted off) 64'
LF	29	(Argentina) Lucas Ocampos		(substituted off) 64'
Substitutions:
FW	31	(Mexico) Roberto de la Rosa		(substituted on) 64'
MF	5	(Mexico) Fidel Ambríz	(yellow card) 90+2'	(substituted on) 64'
FW	16	(Colombia) Johan Rojas		(substituted on) 64'
DF	4	(Mexico) Víctor Guzmán		(substituted on) 79'
FW	11	(Mexico) Alfonso Alvarado	(yellow card) 90'	(substituted on) 88'
Manager:
(Spain) Domènec Torrent

Man of the Match:
Franco Mastantuono (River Plate)

Assistant referees:
Tomaž Klančnik (Slovenia)
Andraž Kovačič (Slovenia)
Fourth official:
Gustavo Tejera (Uruguay)
Video assistant referee:
Carlos del Cerro Grande (Spain)
Assistant video assistant referee:
Jérôme Brisard (France)
Support video assistant referee:
Rob Dieperink (Netherlands)

=== Inter Milan vs River Plate ===
June 25, 2025
6:00 pm PDT

Inter Milan (Italy)	2–0	(Argentina) River Plate
P. Esposito 72'; Bastoni 90+3'	Report

Lumen Field, Seattle
Attendance: 45,135
Referee: Ilgiz Tantashev (Uzbekistan)

Inter Milan	River Plate

GK	1	(Switzerland) Yann Sommer
CB	36	(Italy) Matteo Darmian		(substituted off) 83'
CB	15	(Italy) Francesco Acerbi
CB	95	(Italy) Alessandro Bastoni	(yellow card) 30'
RM	2	(Netherlands) Denzel Dumfries	(yellow card) 90+4'
CM	23	(Italy) Nicolò Barella		(substituted off) 62'
CM	21	(Albania) Kristjan Asllani
CM	22	(Armenia) Henrikh Mkhitaryan
LM	32	(Italy) Federico Dimarco		(substituted off) 62'
CF	10	(Argentina) Lautaro Martínez (c)		(substituted off) 73'
CF	94	(Italy) Pio Esposito		(substituted off) 83'
Substitutions:
MF	8	(Croatia) Petar Sučić		(substituted on) 62'
DF	30	(Brazil) Carlos Augusto	(yellow card) 77'	(substituted on) 62'
FW	45	(Argentina) Valentín Carboni		(substituted on) 73'
FW	70	(Italy) Sebastiano Esposito	(yellow card) 85'	(substituted on) 83'
DF	6	(Netherlands) Stefan de Vrij		(substituted on) 83'
Manager:
(Romania) Cristian Chivu

GK	1	(Argentina) Franco Armani (c)
RB	4	(Argentina) Gonzalo Montiel	(yellow card) 22' (yellow-red card) 90+5'
CB	28	(Argentina) Lucas Martínez Quarta	(red card) 65'
CB	17	(Chile) Paulo Díaz	(yellow card) 88'
LB	21	(Argentina) Marcos Acuña
DM	5	(Argentina) Matías Kranevitter		(substituted off) 61'
CM	8	(Argentina) Maximiliano Meza		(substituted off) 55'
CM	29	(Argentina) Rodrigo Aliendro		(substituted off) 61'
RF	30	(Argentina) Franco Mastantuono
CF	9	(Colombia) Miguel Borja
LF	11	(Argentina) Facundo Colidio		(substituted off) 68'
Substitutions:
MF	26	(Argentina) Ignacio Fernández		(substituted on) 55'
MF	10	(Argentina) Manuel Lanzini	(yellow card) 77'	(substituted on) 61'
MF	35	(Argentina) Giorgio Costantini		(substituted on) 61'
DF	6	(Argentina) Germán Pezzella		(substituted on) 68'
Manager:
(Argentina) Marcelo Gallardo

Man of the Match:
Pio Esposito (Inter Milan)

Assistant referees:
Andrey Tsapenko (Uzbekistan)
Timur Gaynullin (Uzbekistan)
Fourth official:
Campbell-Kirk Kawana-Waugh (New Zealand)
Video assistant referee:
Khamis Al-Marri (Qatar)
Assistant video assistant referee:
Shaun Evans (Australia)
Support video assistant referee:
Tatiana Guzmán (Nicaragua)

=== Urawa Red Diamonds vs Monterrey ===
June 25, 2025
6:00 pm PDT

Urawa Red Diamonds (Japan)	0–4	(Mexico) Monterrey
	Report	Deossa 30'; Berterame 34', 90+7'; Corona 39'

Rose Bowl, Pasadena
Attendance: 14,312
Referee: Felix Zwayer (Germany)

Urawa Red Diamonds	Monterrey

GK	1	(Japan) Shūsaku Nishikawa
RB	14	(Japan) Takahiro Sekine (c)	(substituted off) 68'
CB	3	(Brazil) Danilo Boza
CB	5	(Norway) Marius Høibråten
LB	88	(Japan) Yōichi Naganuma
CM	25	(Japan) Kaito Yasui	(substituted off) 81'
CM	11	(Sweden) Samuel Gustafson	(substituted off) 46'
RW	77	(Japan) Takurō Kaneko	(substituted off) 46'
AM	13	(Japan) Ryōma Watanabe
LW	8	(Brazil) Matheus Sávio	(substituted off) 70'
CF	24	(Japan) Yūsuke Matsuo
Substitutions:
MF	6	(Japan) Taishi Matsumoto	(substituted on) 46'
FW	12	(Brazil) Thiago Santana	(substituted on) 46'
DF	26	(Japan) Takuya Ogiwara	(substituted on) 68'
MF	21	(Japan) Tomoaki Ōkubo	(substituted on) 70'
FW	41	(Japan) Rio Nitta	(substituted on) 81'
Manager:
(Poland) Maciej Skorża

GK	1	(Argentina) Esteban Andrada
RB	2	(Mexico) Ricardo Chávez
CB	33	(Colombia) Stefan Medina	(substituted off) 85'
CB	93	(Spain) Sergio Ramos (c)
LB	21	(Mexico) Luis Reyes	(substituted off) 65'
DM	5	(Mexico) Fidel Ambríz	(substituted off) 84'
CM	6	(Colombia) Nelson Deossa
CM	8	(Spain) Óliver Torres
AM	17	(Mexico) Jesús Manuel Corona	(substituted off) 65'
CF	7	(Mexico) Germán Berterame
CF	11	(Mexico) Alfonso Alvarado	(substituted off) 65'
Substitutions:
DF	3	(Mexico) Gerardo Arteaga	(substituted on) 65'
MF	37	(Mexico) Iker Fimbres	(substituted on) 65'
FW	31	(Mexico) Roberto de la Rosa	(substituted on) 65'
MF	19	(Mexico) Jordi Cortizo	(substituted on) 84'
DF	4	(Mexico) Víctor Guzmán	(substituted on) 85'
Manager:
(Spain) Domènec Torrent

Man of the Match:
Germán Berterame (Monterrey)

Assistant referees:
Robert Kempter (Germany)
Christian Dietz (Germany)
Fourth official:
Gustavo Tejera (Uruguay)
Video assistant referee:
Bastian Dankert (Germany)
Assistant video assistant referee:
Bram Van Driessche (Belgium)
Support video assistant referee:
Mohammed Obaid Khadim (United Arab Emirates)

== Discipline ==
Fair play points would have been used as tiebreakers if the overall and head-to-head records of teams were tied. These were calculated based on yellow and red cards received in all group matches as follows:

- first yellow card: −1 point;
- indirect red card (second yellow card): −3 points;
- direct red card: −4 points;
- yellow card and direct red card: −5 points;

Only one of the above deductions was applied to a player in a single match.

Team	Match 1				Match 2				Match 3				Points
Team	Booked	(yellow card) (yellow-red card)	Sent off (straight red)	(yellow card) (red card)	Booked	(yellow card) (yellow-red card)	Sent off (straight red)	(yellow card) (red card)	Booked	(yellow card) (yellow-red card)	Sent off (straight red)	(yellow card) (red card)	Points
(Japan) Urawa Red Diamonds	2				3								–5
(Mexico) Monterrey	1				5								–6
(Italy) Inter Milan	3								4				–7
(Argentina) River Plate	4				3	1			2	1	1		–19
