= List of professional sports teams in Washington =

List of professional sports teams in Washington may refer to:

- List of professional sports teams in Washington, D.C.
- List of professional sports teams in Washington (state)
- Washington, Tyne and Wear#Sport
