= Sports in Seattle =

The Seattle metropolitan area in the Pacific Northwest region of the United States is home to several professional and amateur sports teams. They include four teams in major leagues, several in minor leagues, and collegiate programs for two National Collegiate Athletic Association (NCAA) Division I universities and one NCAA Division II university.

The city's first professional sports team was the Pacific Coast Hockey Association's (PCHA) Seattle Metropolitans, who became the first American ice hockey team to win the Stanley Cup. Several expansion teams were created for Seattle by various leagues in the 1960s and 1970s, including the Seattle SuperSonics of the National Basketball Association in 1967; the short-lived Seattle Pilots in Major League Baseball, who played one season in 1969; the original Seattle Sounders of the North American Soccer League in 1974; the National Football League's Seattle Seahawks in 1976; and the Seattle Mariners in Major League Baseball in 1977. Several of these teams shared the Kingdome, a multipurpose venue opened in 1976, before purpose-built stadiums were built in the 1990s and 2000s.

Several professional teams in women's leagues were also established in the 21st century, including the Seattle Storm of the Women's National Basketball Association (WNBA) and Seattle Reign FC of the National Women's Soccer League (NWSL). Other franchises established in the 2010s include the Seattle Kraken of the National Hockey League and the Seattle Seawolves of Major League Rugby. In 2023, the city welcomed one of the first six franchises in North America's newly-formed professional cricket (MLC) league with the arrival of the Seattle Orcas. And, in 2025, Seattle entered the newly-formed eight-team Professional Women's Hockey League with the Seattle Torrent.

== Major professional teams ==
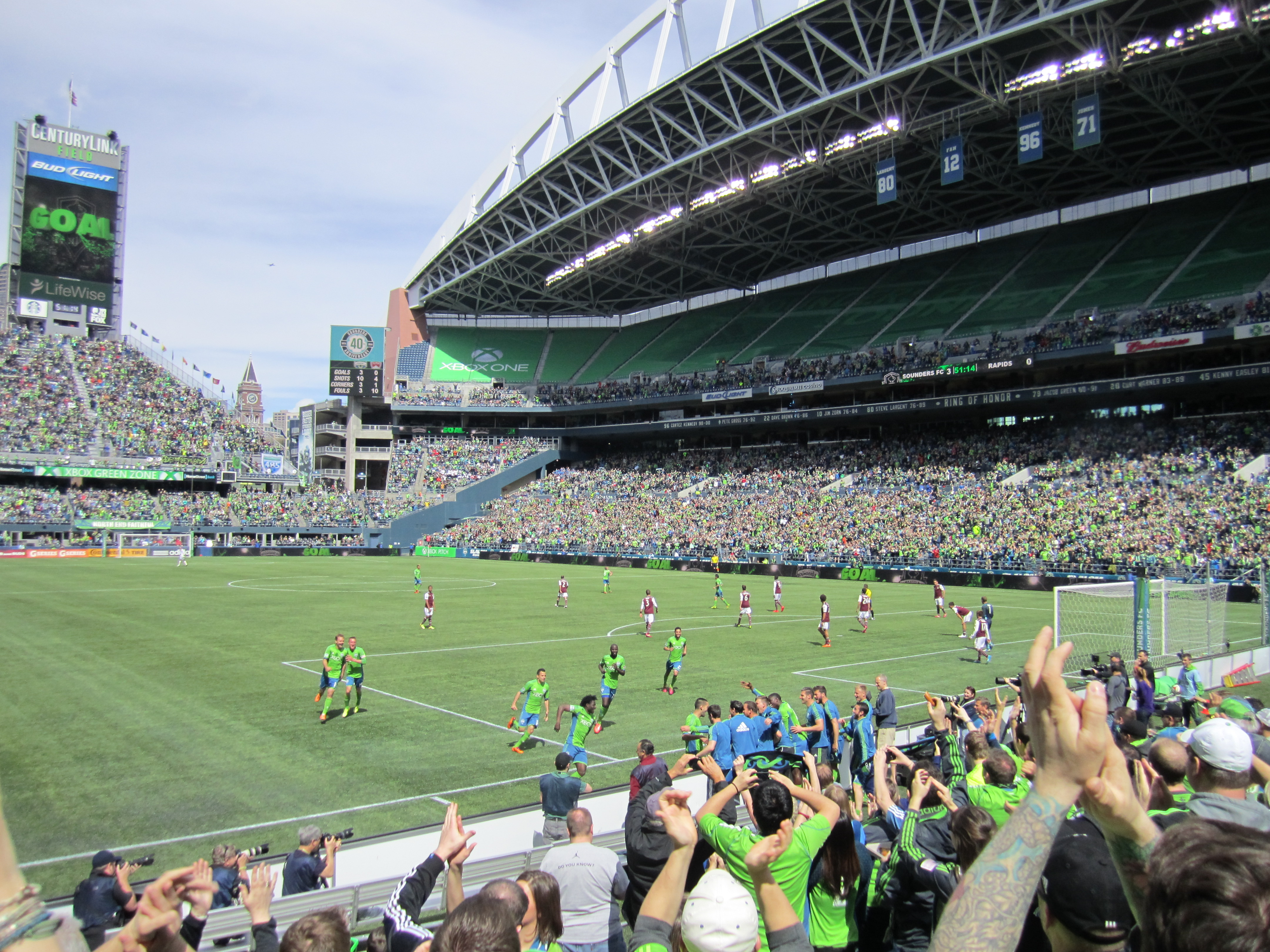
Seattle Sounders FC players celebrating the third goal in a 4–1 victory over the Colorado Rapids at Lumen Field

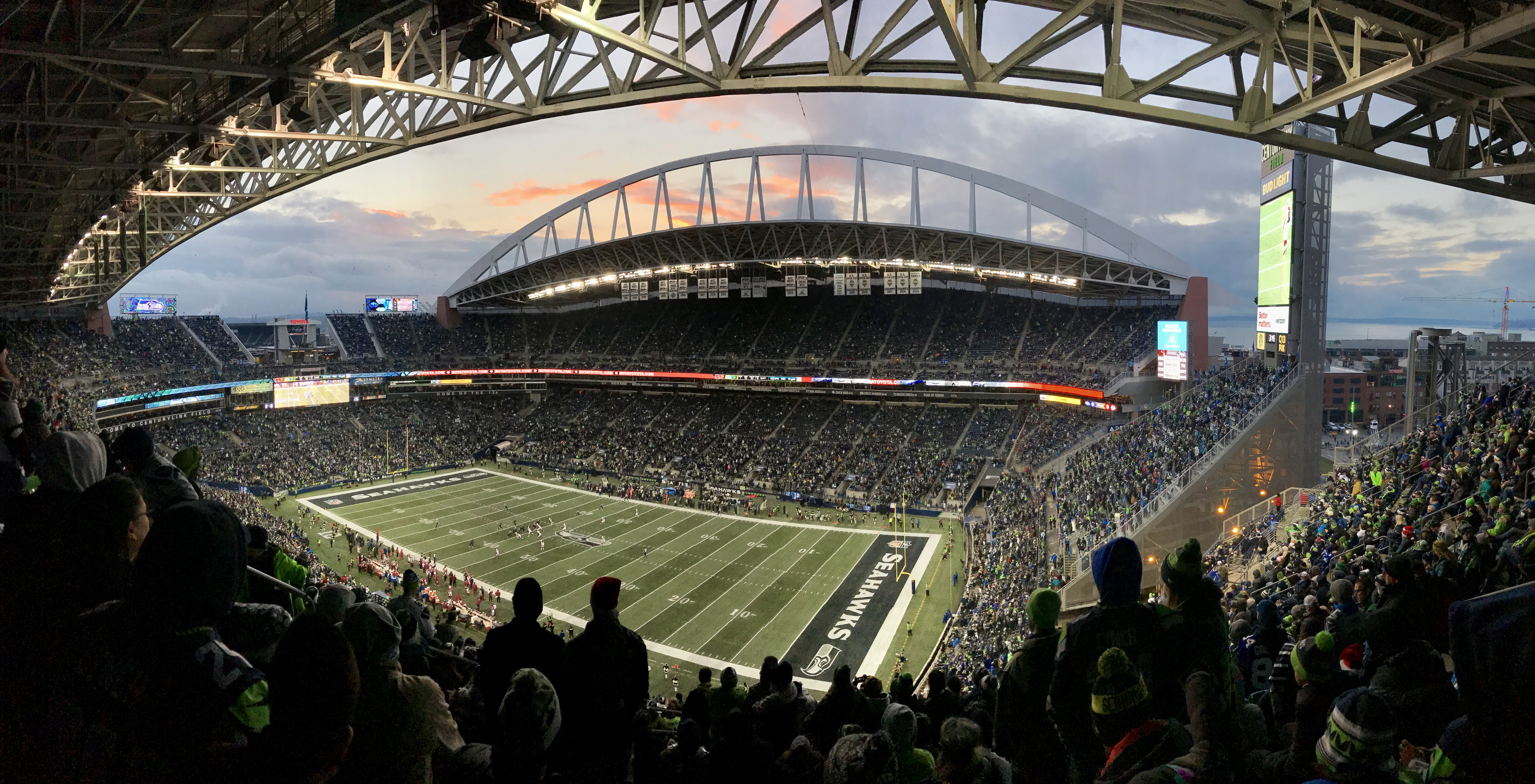
Lumen Field during a Seattle Seahawks game.

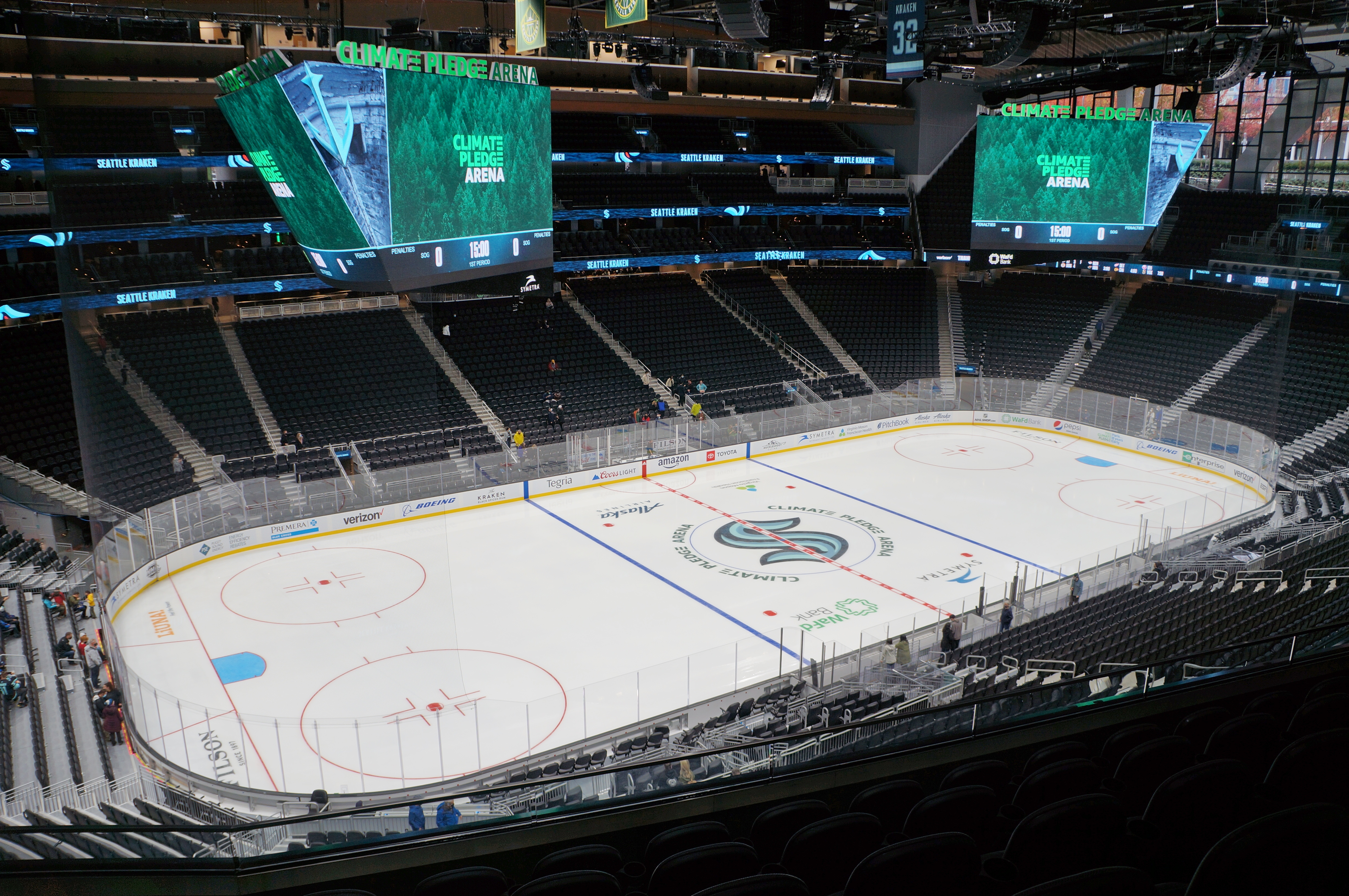
Climate Pledge Arena set up for a Seattle Kraken game.

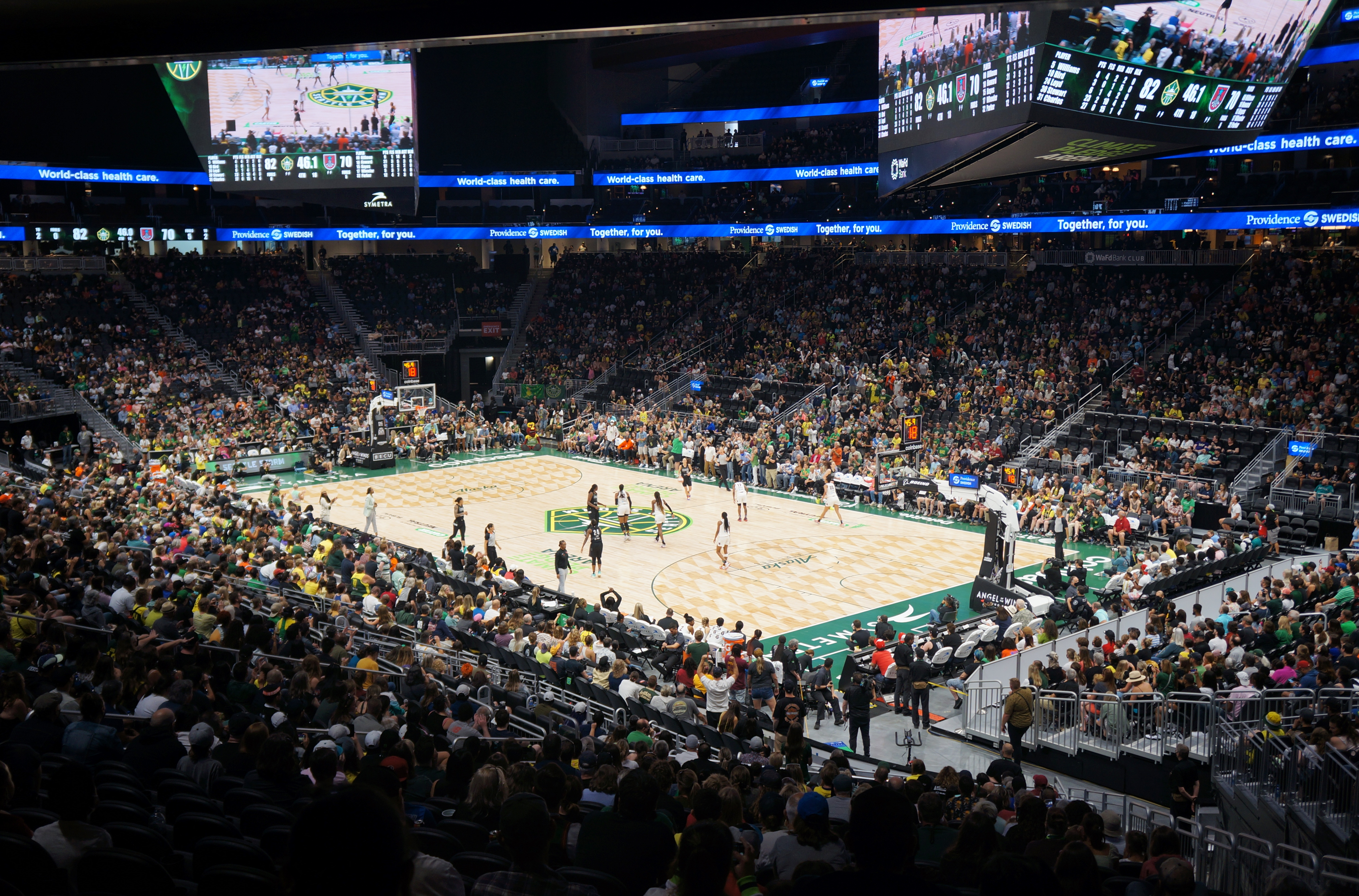
Climate Pledge Arena is also home to the Seattle Storm and was the home of the Seattle SuperSonics from 1967 to 2008.

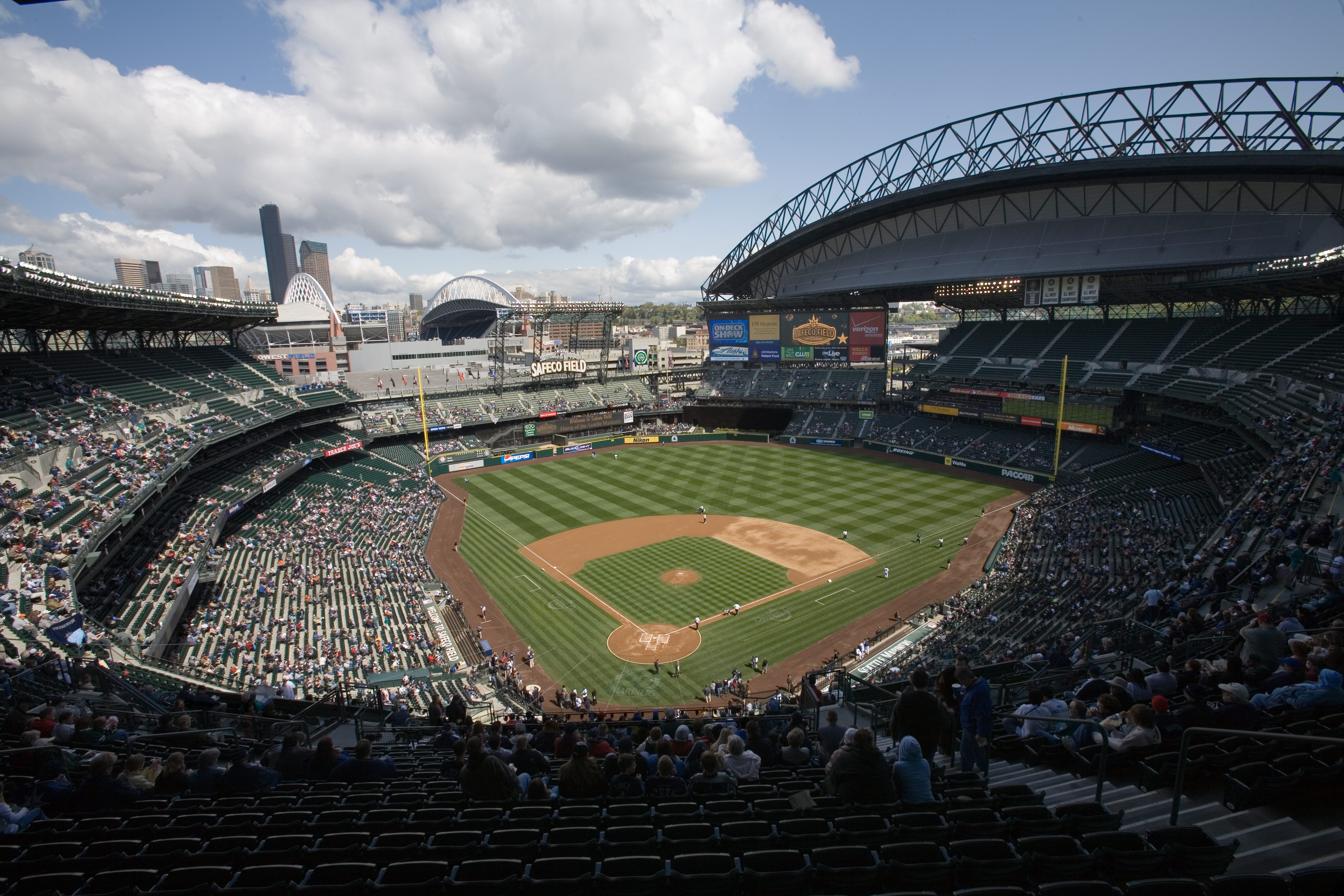
T-Mobile Park during a Seattle Mariners game.

At 4.1 million residents in 2025, Seattle has the 15th-largest metropolitan area (between metro Detroit at 4.4 million and the Twin Cities at 3.7 million) in the United States. Since the late 20th century, rapid population growth in the counties surrounding the City of Seattle (King County; Pierce County and Snohomish County) and the satellite cities in these counties (Bellevue; Tacoma and Everett) has led to the establishment of new professional sports teams in the Puget Sound region. Seattle's teams are known for their high attendances across several leagues. It is also the only U.S. city to have teams in three professional women's leagues—the Women's National Basketball Association, National Women's Soccer League, and Professional Women's Hockey League.

Professional soccer in Seattle has always involved the Seattle Sounders, whose original team played in the defunct NASL in the 1970s through to its demise in 1983. The name lived on in a second incarnation of the team, which played in the second level of US soccer from 1994 through 2008. In November 2007, Major League Soccer announced that Seattle would host the league's fifteenth franchise to start play in 2009. The team held a vote among its fan base for the team's name between March 27 and 31, 2008 and Seattle Sounders FC was chosen. The current version of the Sounders plays at Lumen Field.

In 1976, the NFL's Seattle Seahawks began play. The Seahawks played at the Kingdome until its implosion in 2000. The Seahawks now play in Lumen Field.

In 1977, following years of legal wrangling over the move of the Seattle Pilots to Milwaukee (to become the Milwaukee Brewers), the MLB awarded Seattle a new baseball franchise, the Seattle Mariners. From 1977 the Mariners played in the Kingdome until mid-season 1999 when the team moved across the street to what is now known as T-Mobile Park, where they continue to play today.

The WNBA's Seattle Storm arrived in Seattle in 2000, and played at KeyArena through the 2018 season. After KeyArena was closed for its reconfiguration as today's Climate Pledge Arena, the Storm split their 2019 home games between Angel of the Winds Arena in Everett and Alaska Airlines Arena on the University of Washington campus. The WNBA's 2020 season, held amidst COVID-19, was completely moved to Bradenton, Florida. When the league returned to home markets in 2021, the Storm played all home games at Angel of the Winds Arena, and returned to Climate Pledge Arena in 2022.

In 2013, Seattle's professional women's soccer team Seattle Reign FC, including several members of the World Cup winning US women's national team, opened their first season as Seattle Reign FC in the National Women's Soccer League at Starfire Sports Complex and played at Memorial Stadium in Seattle Center through 2018. Starting in the 2019 NWSL season, the rebranded Reign FC began play on their new home pitch at Tacoma's Cheney Stadium. During the 2019–20 offseason, the parent company of prominent French club Olympique Lyonnais bought a majority stake in Reign FC, and soon rebranded the side yet again as OL Reign. The team returned to Seattle in 2022 and now shares Lumen Field with the Seahawks and Sounders.

In September 2012, the Seattle City Council agreed to move forward towards building a $490 million new arena in the SoDo, Seattle, neighborhood. This commitment was intended to help bring the NBA back to Seattle along with the NHL. Instead, five years later, on December 3, 2017, the Council approved the expansion of Key Arena in Seattle Center, under the direction of the Oak View Group. Three days later, on December 6, 2017, the NHL awarded a new franchise opportunity to Seattle.

In 1976, Seattle was awarded a conditional NHL franchise; however, this opportunity did not come to fruition. The new professional hockey team was originally expected to join the league in the 2020-21 season, given an on-time completion of the Arena expansion project. On December 4, 2018, the NHL Board of Governors unanimously approved Seattle's bid to become the 32nd NHL team, being the Seattle Kraken. The Kraken's inaugural season was played in the revamped Key Arena - now Climate Pledge Arena - starting in October 2021. The new Seattle franchise expanded and rebalanced the league to four 8-team divisions, equal to the NFL in size. In just their second regular season, the Seattle Kraken made their first trip to the Stanley Cup playoffs from the top Wild Card position in the Pacific Division (NHL). Unexpectedly, the Kraken defeated the previous-season's Stanley Cup winning Colorado Avalanche (NHL) in Game 7 of their first-round series, knocking out the defending champs and securing the 32nd franchise's first playoff series victory.

In 2017, the Seattle Seawolves became one of the founding teams of the newly-formed Major League Rugby. The Seawolves won back-to-back titles in the first two seasons of the league's existence, defeating the Glendale Raptors 23–19 in 2018 and San Diego Legion 26–23 in 2019.

In 2025, following the success of the PWHL Takeover Tour game in Seattle, the city was awarded a Professional Women's Hockey League (PWHL) expansion franchise known as the Seattle Torrent.

=== Current major professional teams ===
Current major professional sports teams in the Seattle area
Name	Sport	League	Home venue	Founded	First season	Major titles (Note: Major titles include all league championships and cup competitions. In U.S. professional men's soccer, there are currently five annual national and international champion honors: the MLS Cup, the U.S. Open Cup, the Supporters' Shield, the Leagues Cup, and the CONCACAF Champions Cup. In U.S. professional women's soccer, there are currently four annual national and international titles: the NWSL Challenge Cup, the NWSL Shield, the NWSL Championship, and the CONCACAF W Champions Cup.)	Avg. attendance (Note: Regular season average as of the most recent completed season, either in 2025 or 2025–26.)	Ref.
Seattle Kraken	Ice hockey	NHL	Climate Pledge Arena	2018	2021–22	0	17,151	
Seattle Mariners	Baseball	MLB	T-Mobile Park	1976	1977	0	31,333	
Seattle Orcas	Twenty20 cricket	MLC	None (Note: The Seattle Orcas currently play at a set of rotating venues designated by Major League Cricket and plan to build a cricket stadium at Marymoor Park in Redmond, Washington.)	2023	2023	0	2,300	
Seattle Reign FC	Soccer	NWSL	Lumen Field	2012	2013	4	7,864	
Seattle Seahawks	American football	NFL	Lumen Field	1974	1976	2	68,740	
Seattle Seawolves	Rugby union	MLR	Starfire Sports Complex	2017	2018	2	—N/a	
Seattle Sounders FC	Soccer	MLS	Lumen Field	2007 (Note: The original Sounders franchise in the North American Soccer League was founded in 1973. The current team in Major League Soccer was founded in 2007 and began play in 2009.)	2009	9	30,993	
Seattle Storm	Basketball	WNBA	Climate Pledge Arena	1999	2000	4	11,835	
Seattle Torrent	Ice hockey	PWHL	Climate Pledge Arena	2025	2025–26	0	12,875	

=== Championships ===
As of 2026, the city of Seattle enjoys a total of 23 national & international professional team championships, including one Stanley Cup, one NBA Championship, two Super Bowls (XLVIII and LX), four WNBA championships, four U.S. Open Cups, one MLS Supporters' Shield, two MLS Cups, one CONCACAF Champions League Cup, one Leagues Cup, three NWSL Shields, one The Women's Cup trophy and two MLR Championship Shields. Twenty-one of these twenty-three titles were won in the 21st century, over the course of 22 years (2004–2026).

Seattle's first professional sports championship was brought to the city by the Seattle Metropolitans in 1917, when they became the first American team to win the coveted Stanley Cup by beating the Montreal Canadiens three games to one. They returned to the Stanley Cup Final twice more. Their first return, again versus Montreal, was in 1919; that series was cancelled due to an outbreak of influenza with the two teams tied at 2–2–1. The Metropolitans last went to the Stanley Cup Final in 1920, when they lost to the Ottawa Senators.

Led by Lenny Wilkens, the Seattle SuperSonics made it to the NBA Finals in two consecutive years in the late 1970s. In 1978 they lost the championship series to the Washington Bullets in seven games, but rebounded in 1979 to defeat the Bullets by four games to one to win the NBA Championship. The next time the Sonics made it to NBA Finals was in 1996 when they met the Chicago Bulls, to whom they lost the series in six games.

Another national basketball championship trophy arrived in 2004, when the Seattle Storm defeated the Connecticut Sun two games to one to win the WNBA championship. The Seattle Storm won their second WNBA title in 2010, beating the Atlanta Dream in 3 games. Eight years later, the Storm swept the Washington Mystics in 2018 to take their third national championship. The team earned a fourth WNBA title in 2020 in a sweep against the Las Vegas Aces with all games played at a quarantined facility in Florida.

The Seattle Mariners have won the American League West Pennant four times – in 1995, 1997, 2001 and, most recently, in 2025. The Mariners, however, have yet to win an American League Championship Series or participate in a World Series Championship. After the then-longest playoff drought in professional American sports (21 years), the Mariners clinched their next trip to the post-season on September 30, 2022 by defeating the Oakland Athletics with a walk-off home run in the ninth inning in front of a sold-out crowd at T-Mobile Park.

Seattle Sounders FC won the U.S. Open Cup in the team's inaugural season of 2009. The Sounders won the U.S. Open Cup again in 2010, becoming the first MLS team to achieve back-to-back U.S. Open Cup Titles. Seattle continued its U.S. Open Cup dominance in the 2011 campaign, becoming the fourth team ever to win the tournament in three consecutive years (the last being the Greek American AA in 1967–69). The Sounders beat the Chicago Fire 2–0 in front of a then record-setting MLS crowd of 35,615 at CenturyLink Field (now Lumen Field) on October 4, 2011. On September 16, 2014, the Sounders captured their fourth U.S. Open Cup title, overcoming the Philadelphia Union – on the Union's home pitch – in extra time by a final score of 3–1. On October 25, 2014, in front of a crowd of 57,673 at CenturyLink Field, the Sounders topped the LA Galaxy by a score of 2–0 to claim their first MLS Supporters' Shield. The Sounders captured their first Western Conference title when they defeated the Colorado Rapids by an aggregate score of 3–1 on November 27, 2016, in Commerce City, Colorado. Then, on December 10, 2016 in front of a crowd of 36,000 at BMO Field, the Sounders won their first MLS Cup against Toronto FC in a penalty shootout by a score of 5–4. The following season - on December 9, 2017 - the Sounders returned to the MLS Cup against Toronto FC (held again at BMO Field). This time, the Sounders lost the Cup to the home team by a score of 0–2. On November 10, 2019, the Sounders played in their third MLS Cup against Toronto FC, winning 3–1 to achieve their second title with a club-record home attendance of 69,274. On May 4, 2022 - in front of a home crowd of 68,751 - the Sounders became the first MLS team to win the 2022 CONCACAF Champions League, defeating Mexican side Pumas UNAM with an aggregate score of 5 goals to 2. In 2025, the Sounders won their first Leagues Cup, defeating Lionel Messi and Inter Miami by 3 goals to 0 in front of a home crowd of 69,314.

In 2014 – the second regular season of the U.S. National Women's Soccer League – Seattle Reign FC attained the highest season point total of all nine league teams to receive their first NWSL Shield award. The Reign became the league's first team to repeat this achievement when they defeated the Boston Breakers at Memorial Stadium on August 26, 2015. On October 1, 2022, OL Reign clinched their third NWSL Shield by defeating the Orlando Pride 3–0.

The Seahawks have won twelve NFL division titles, including two in the AFC West and ten in the NFC West. They won the NFC championship in 2006, earning them their first trip to Super Bowl XL, where they lost to the Pittsburgh Steelers 21–10. In 2014, the Seahawks defeated the San Francisco 49ers at CenturyLink Field, to clinch their second NFC title and a berth in Super Bowl XLVIII, where they routed the Denver Broncos 43–8 to win their first Lombardi trophy. The following season, the Seahawks overcame a deficit in the NFC championship game with the Green Bay Packers in the final minutes of the fourth quarter to claim their first back-to-back George Halas trophies. In Super Bowl XLIX at the University of Phoenix Stadium (now State Farm Stadium), the Seahawks missed the opportunity to claim their second Super Bowl win in the final seconds of the fourth quarter, falling to the New England Patriots by a score of 28–24. In Super Bowl LX, the Seahawks got revenge in a rematch with the Patriots and defeated them 29–13.

== Other teams ==
The Seattle Thunderbirds are a Major Junior league ice hockey team that plays at the ShoWare Center. The Thunderbirds arrived in Seattle in 1977 as the Seattle Breakers, before changing to their current name in 1985. They play in the Western Hockey League, one of three components of the Canadian Hockey League, traditionally a major feeder system for the NHL. The Thunderbirds won their first WHL Ed Chynoweth Cup on May 14, 2017, against the Regina Pats by a score of 4 games to 2. Also, they defeated the Winnipeg Ice 4 games to 1 in the finals to win another Ed Chynoweth Cup in 2023.

Originally arriving in 1974, the men's soccer team Seattle Sounders played in Seattle until 1983 when the North American Soccer League collapsed due to overexpansion. The Seattle Sounders were brought back in 1994 and played in the USL First Division at what was then known as Qwest Field. Six years later the men's team was joined by a women's team of the same name (now known as the Seattle Sounder Angels) which plays in a nearby suburb, Tukwila. In 2008, the USL incarnation of the Sounders played its last season, and in 2009 Seattle Sounders FC began playing in MLS, America's top soccer division. The Sounders play league matches at the since-renamed Lumen Field, but use the Starfire Sports Complex in Tukwila for matches in the Lamar Hunt U.S. Open Cup (except when they host the final).

Seattle Reign FC was established in 2013 and compete in the National Women's Soccer League; the team returned to Seattle in 2022 after three seasons at Cheney Stadium in Tacoma and now shares Lumen Field with the Sounders and Seahawks. It was originally named Seattle Reign FC, after a women's basketball team in the former American Basketball League, and played at Starfire and Memorial Stadium. Upon moving to Tacoma in 2019, they changed their name to Reign FC, and after being purchased in 2020 by the parent company of French Ligue 1 power Olympique Lyonnais, rebranded again as OL Reign. They were renamed back to Seattle Reign FC in 2024.

Several minor-league soccer teams are also based in the Seattle area, including members of USL League Two. Two neighborhood-level teams, Ballard FC and West Seattle Junction FC, play in Seattle proper.

=== Current teams ===
Club	Sport	League	Stadium	Founded
Ballard FC	Soccer	USL League 2	Interbay Stadium	2021
CHEER Seattle	Cheerleading	Pride Cheerleading Association		2014
Crossfire Redmond	Soccer	National Premier Soccer League	Redmond High School	2002
Dockyard Derby Dames	Roller Derby	Women's Flat Track Derby Association	Pierce College	2005
Everett AquaSox	Baseball	Northwest League	Funko Field	1995
Everett Silvertips	Ice Hockey	Western Hockey League	Angel of the Winds Arena	2003
Jet City Roller Derby	Roller Derby	Women's Flat Track Derby Association	Edmonds College	2006
Midlakes United	Soccer	USL League 2	Bellevue College Soccer Field	2023
OSA Seattle FC	Soccer	National Premier Soccer League	Starfire Sports Complex	2008
Puget Sound Outcast Derby	Roller Derby	Men's Roller Derby Association	Everett Skate Deck	2007
Rainier Roller Riot	Roller Derby	Women's Flat Track Derby Association	Varies	
Rat City Rollergirls	Roller Derby	Women's Flat Track Derby Association	Spartan Recreation Center and Climate Pledge Arena	2004
Salmon Bay FC	Soccer	USL W League	Interbay Stadium	2024
Seattle Cascades	Ultimate Frisbee	Ultimate Frisbee Association	Memorial Stadium	2014
Seattle Cascades Drum and Bugle Corps	Drum and Bugle Corps	Drum Corps International		1966
Seattle Grizzlies	Australian Football	U.S. Australian Football League	Magnuson Park	1998
Seattle Lady Grizzlies	Australian Football	U.S. Australian Football League	Magnuson Park	2016
Seattle Majestics	American football	Women's National Football Conference	French Field	2002
Seattle Mountaineers	Basketball	American Basketball Association	Everett Community College	2006
Seattle Riot	Ultimate Frisbee	USA Ultimate	Varies	2000
Seattle Saracens	Rugby union	BC Premier League	Magnuson Park	1966
Seattle Sockeye	Ultimate Frisbee	USA Ultimate	Varies	1993
Seattle Slugs	Chess	United States Chess Federation	Varies	2012
Seattle Super Hawks	Basketball	United States Basketball League	Royal Brougham Pavilion	2022
Seattle Tempest	Ultimate Frisbee	Western Ultimate League	Memorial Stadium	2021
Seattle Thunderbirds	Ice Hockey	Western Hockey League	accesso ShoWare Center	1971
Seattle Thunderbolts	Twenty20 cricket	Minor League Cricket	Tollgate Farm Park	2020
Seattle Thunder	American football	X League	accesso ShoWare Center	2020
Seattle Totems	Ice Hockey	United States Premier Hockey League	Olympic View Arena	2005
Sound FC	Soccer	Women's Premier Soccer League	Starfire Sports Complex	2019
Tacoma Defiance	Soccer	MLS Next Pro	Starfire Sports Complex	2014
Tacoma Rainiers	Baseball	Pacific Coast League	Cheney Stadium	1960
Tacoma Stars	Indoor soccer	Major Arena Soccer League	accesso ShoWare Center	2003
Tilted Thunder Rail Birds	Banked Track Roller Derby	Roller Derby Coalition of Leagues	Everett Community College	2008
Washington Wolfpack	Arena football	Arena Football League	Angel of the Winds Arena	2023
West Seattle Junction FC	Soccer	USL League 2	Nino Cantu Southwest Athletic Complex	2023
West Seattle Rhodies FC	Soccer	USL W League	Nino Cantu Southwest Athletic Complex	2024

=== Championships ===
The Seattle Sounders (USL) won the A-League championship in 1995 and 1996 and the US First Division championship in 2005 and 2007.

The Seattle SeaDogs defeated the Houston Hotshots two games to none for the Continental Indoor Soccer League championship in 1997.

The Washington Stealth defeated the Toronto Rock 15–11 at Xfinity Arena - now Angel of the Winds Arena in Everett for the National Lacrosse League Champion's Cup in 2010.

The Seattle Sockeye won the USA Ultimate Club Championships in 2004, 2006, 2007, and 2019. They won the gold medal at the World Ultimate Club Championships (WUCC) in 1997 in Vancouver, British Columbia. They also won the silver medal at the World Ultimate Games (WUGC) in 2008 in Vancouver and at WUCC in 2010 in Prague, Czech Republic.

The Seattle Grizzlies won the USAFL Division 3 Title in 2017 as well as the Division 2 Title in 2008.

The Seattle Thunderbirds were the 2-time WHL champions in the 2016–17 and 2022–23 seasons.

== College sports ==
The University of Washington, Seattle University, and Seattle Pacific University field teams in a variety of sports, including football, basketball, and rowing. Their teams are known as the Huskies, Redhawks, and Falcons, respectively. The Husky football team has a following that ranks with those of the major professional teams in the city. In 1991, the Huskies shared an NCAA Division I collegiate football championship with the Hurricanes of the University of Miami. In total, Washington has won 18 conference championships, 7 Rose Bowls and 2 national NCAA Division I championships.

The Washington Huskies began their first varsity programs for women's sports in 1975 under the provisions of Title IX, which banned discrimination based on sex for educational institutions that received federal funding. The women's basketball team has played in 20 editions of the NCAA Division I tournament since 1981. The Huskies volleyball team won their first national Division I title in 2005 and have been in the NCAA Final Four in five tournaments. The softball program was created in 1993 and qualified for 15 editions of the Women's College World Series, earning their first title in 2009. The women's soccer team has had 18 appearances in the Women's College Cup but have not won a championship.

A Huskies rowing team represented the United States at the 1936 Summer Olympics in Berlin, Germany and defeated the Nazi Germany team to win the gold medal. The story was later chronicled in the 2013 book The Boys in the Boat. The women's rowing team has won five NCAA titles and is one of three programs nationally to have been invited to every edition of the championship.

In addition to the Seattle-based teams, the Spokane-based Gonzaga Bulldogs play one men's basketball game each season at Climate Pledge Arena in an event billed as the Battle in Seattle.

Major D1 NCAA college sports teams
Club	Sport	Division (Conf.)	Stadium
Washington Huskies	Football	Division I (Big Ten)	Husky Stadium
Washington Huskies	Basketball	Division I (Big Ten)	Alaska Airlines Arena at Hec Edmundson Pavilion
Seattle Redhawks	Basketball	Division I (WCC)	Climate Pledge Arena, Redhawk Center

== High school and youth sports ==
The Seattle High School football team won the national championship in 1906.

Rugby is growing in Seattle at the high school and youth level, with several schools adding programs, such as Shorecrest, Roosevelt and Nathan Hale High School.

== Former teams ==
=== Former major professional teams ===
The first professional team to play in Seattle was the PCHA Seattle Metropolitans, which played in the Seattle Ice Arena between 1915 and 1924. In 1967, the NBA's Seattle SuperSonics (more commonly known as the "Sonics") became the first modern-day major professional sports franchise in Seattle. However, in 2008, the Sonics' ownership group moved the team to Oklahoma City. The NBA approved a bid process for a Seattle expansion team in 2026 that would allow for a potential revival of the Sonics franchise. In 1969, the Major League Baseball Seattle Pilots were established, but only played one year in Seattle before moving to Milwaukee. The Pilots' sole season was immortalized in Jim Bouton's book Ball Four.

Club Name	Sport	League	Championships	In Seattle	Last venue	Fate
Seattle Metropolitans	Ice hockey	PCHA	1917 Stanley Cup	1915–1924	Seattle Ice Arena	Folded, league collapsed
Seattle Pilots	Baseball	MLB	none	1969	Sick's Stadium	Moved, became Milwaukee Brewers
Seattle SuperSonics	Basketball	NBA	1979 NBA	1967–2008	KeyArena	Moved, became Oklahoma City Thunder

=== Other former teams ===
Club	Sport	League	Championships	In Seattle	Last Venue	Fate
Everett Hawks	Indoor football	NWFL, NIFL, AF2	'03, '04 (NWFL), '04 (NAFL)	2002-2007	Comcast Arena	Folded
Everett Raptors	Indoor football	IFL	None	2010-2012	Comcast Arena	Folded
Inter United FC	Soccer	NPSL	None	2014	Werner L. Neudorf Stadium	Folded
Seattle Cascades	Team tennis	WTT	None	1974-1978	Mercer Arena	Team folded
Seattle Force	Rugby league	WAMNRL/AMNRL	n/a		Memorial Stadium	Leagues folded
Seattle Mist	Indoor football	LFL	2015, 2017, 2019	2009-2019	ShoWare Center	League ceased operations
Seattle Rangers	Football	CFL	None	1967-1969	Memorial Stadium	League folded
Seattle Reign	Women's basketball	ABL	None	1996-1998	Mercer Arena, KeyArena	League folded
Seattle SeaDogs	Indoor soccer	CISL	1997 CISL Championship	1995-1997	KeyArena	League folded
Seattle Sea Dragons	Football	XFL	None	2020-2023	Lumen Field	Team folded
Sporting International FC	Soccer	NPSL / PASL	0	2013-2016	Pop Keeney Stadium	Folded
Seattle Steelheads	Baseball	West Coast Negro Baseball Association	None	1944-1946	Sick's Stadium	League folded
Seattle Totems	Ice hockey	CHL	Three Lester Patrick Cups (1959, 1967, 1968)	1944-1974	Seattle Center Coliseum	Folded
Seattle Surge	Esports	Call of Duty League	0	2019-2024	None	Relocated
Snohomish Co. Explosion	Basketball	IBL, NABL	None	2007-2010	Monroe Sports Arena	Folded
Tacoma Rockets	Ice hockey	WHL	None	1991-1995	Tacoma Dome	Relocated
Tacoma Sabercats	Ice hockey	WCHL	1998-99 Taylor Cup Champions	1997-2002	Tacoma Dome	Folded
Washington Rampage	Basketball	ABA	None	2011-2014	Edmonds College	Folded
Washington Stealth	Lacrosse	NLL	2010 Champion's Cup	2010-2013	Comcast Arena	Relocated

== Other sports ==
Swimmer Helene Madison (1913–1970) of Seattle won three gold medals at the 1932 Summer Olympics.

The Seattle Dojo, which was founded between 1903 and 1907, is the oldest judo academy in the contiguous United States. The dojo moved to its own building in 1934 and was temporarily closed during World War II and the internment of Japanese Americans. It is one of several dojos in the Seattle area that hold competitions, which include school programs in some cities.

The sport of pickleball was invented on Bainbridge Island in 1965 and became the state sport in 2022. Pickleball was taught in local schools and enjoyed popularity before it found a large national following in the 2020s. As of a 2024 survey by Nielsen, 8.2 percent of adults in the Seattle metropolitan area had recently played pickleball—among the highest rates for U.S. cities.

== Sporting events ==
Seattle has been host to a number of important sporting events. It hosted the NFL Pro Bowl in 1977, the Major League Baseball All-Star Game in 1979, 2001 and 2023, the NBA All-Star Game in 1974 and 1987, the MLS Cup in 2009 and 2019, the Goodwill Games in 1990 and the NCAA Final Four in 1984, 1989 and 1995. On July 22, 2017 at KeyArena, the Seattle Storm hosted the WNBA All-Star Game for the first time. Seattle hosted the 2023 Major League Baseball All-Star Game at T-Mobile Park on July 11, 2023. The NHL Winter Classic is January 1, 2024 and features the Seattle Kraken and Vegas Golden Knights.

In 1998, the Seattle City Council rejected a resolution 8-to-1 that would have allowed Seattle to be considered for the 2012 Summer Olympics.

The Seattle Marathon has taken place annually since 1970.

Seattle has hosted several United States men's national soccer team and United States women's national soccer team events in the past, including men's FIFA World Cup qualifying matches in 1976 and 2013.

Lumen Field has hosted CONCACAF Gold Cup matches in 2005 and 2013. The stadium was also proposed as a 2016 Copa América venue and was considered, along with Husky Stadium, in the failed U.S. bid for the 2022 FIFA World Cup. The stadium also hosted the group stage matches for Seattle Sounders FC during the 2025 FIFA Club World Cup.

=== 2005 CONCACAF Gold Cup ===
Date	Time (UTC−7)	Team #1	Res.	Team #2	Round	Attendance
July 7, 2005	17:30	Canada	0–1	Costa Rica	Group B	15,831
July 7, 2005	19:30	Cuba	1–4	United States	Group B	15,831
July 9, 2005	11:30	Costa Rica	3–1	Cuba	Group B	15,109
July 9, 2005	13:30	United States	2–0	Canada	Group B	15,109

=== 2013 CONCACAF Gold Cup ===
Date	Time (UTC−7)	Team #1	Res.	Team #2	Round	Attendance
July 11, 2013	17:30	Panama	1–0	Martinique	Group A	28,354
July 11, 2013	20:00	Mexico	2–0	Canada	Group A	28,354

=== Copa América Centenario ===
Date	Time (UTC−7)	Team #1	Res.	Team #2	Round	Attendance
June 4, 2016	16:30	Haiti	0–1	Peru	Group B	20,190
June 14, 2016	19:00	Argentina	3–0	Bolivia	Group D	45,753
June 16, 2016	18:30	United States	2–1	Colombia	Quarterfinals	47,322

=== 2025 FIFA Club World Cup ===
Date	Time (UTC−7)	Team #1	Score	Team #2	Round	Attendance
June 15, 2025	19:00	Botafogo (Brazil)	2–1	(United States) Seattle Sounders FC	Group B	30,151
June 17, 2025	12:00	River Plate (Argentina)	3–1	(Japan) Urawa Red Diamonds	Group E	11,974
June 19, 2025	15:00	Seattle Sounders FC (United States)	1–3	(Spain) Atlético Madrid	Group B	51,636
June 21, 2025	12:00	Inter Milan (Italy)	2–1	(Japan) Urawa Red Diamonds	Group E	25,090
June 23, 2025	12:00	Seattle Sounders FC (United States)	0–2	(France) Paris Saint-Germain	Group B	50,628
June 25, 2025	18:00	Inter Milan (Italy)	2–0	(Argentina) River Plate	Group E	45,135

=== 2026 FIFA World Cup ===
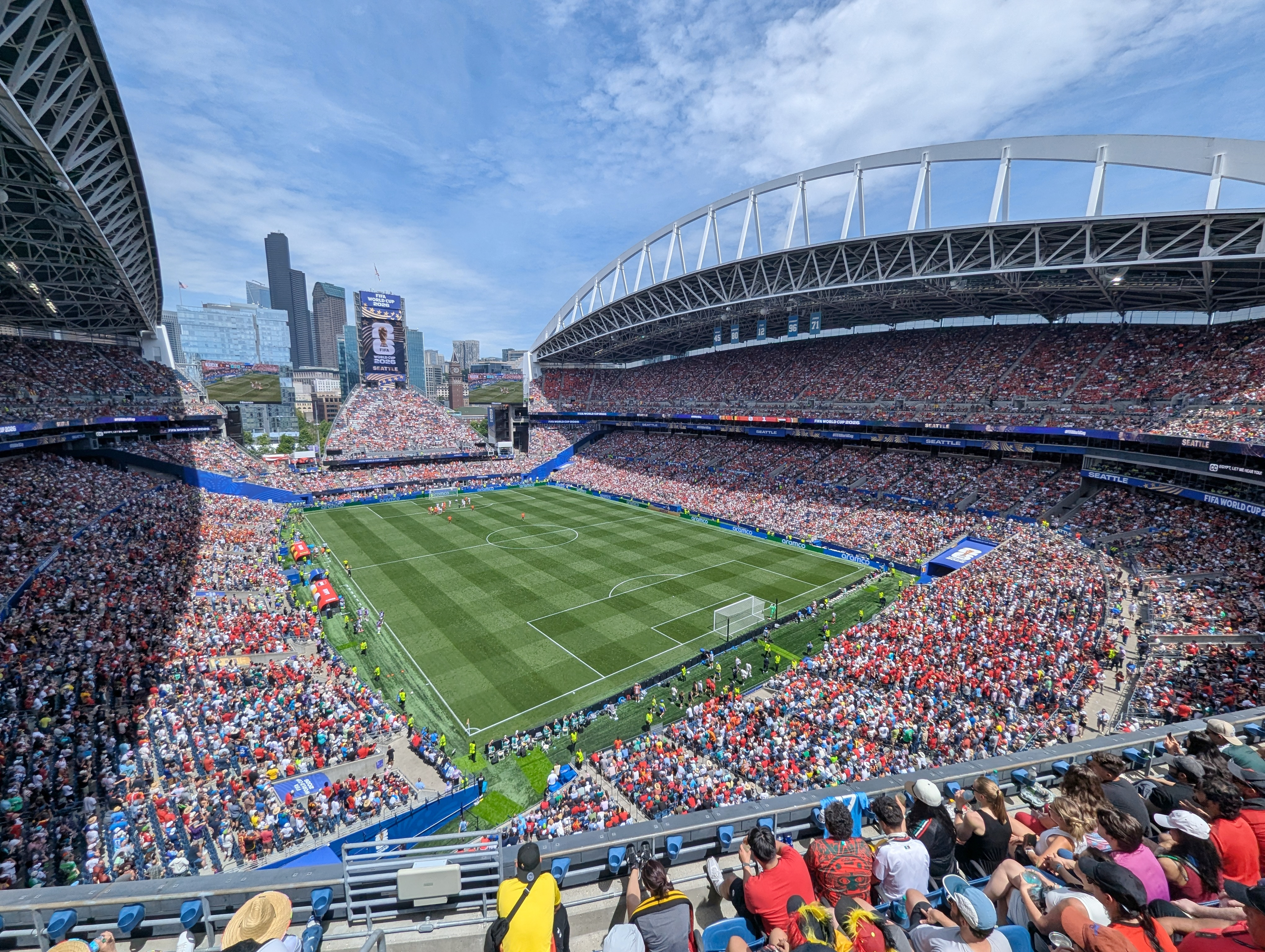
Inside Lumen Field during the Belgium vs. Egypt match at the 2026 FIFA World Cup.

Lumen Field was one of eleven U.S. venues which hosted matches during the 2026 FIFA World Cup. Seattle had previously been rejected for the 1994 FIFA World Cup after the Kingdome and Husky Stadium were deemed to be unsuitable for the tournament's needs. Lumen Field underwent renovations to host six matches during the tournament and was temporarily renamed to Seattle Stadium in accordance with FIFA's guidelines on sponsorships. The stadium and its atmosphere were praised by international fans and media outlets; transit agencies also set ridership records on matchdays, with the Link light rail system carrying 280,000 passengers on June 19 ahead of the United States group stage game.

The Seattle local organizing committee designated two themed matches—Juneteenth on June 19 and Pride on June 26—prior to the tournament draw. The Pride Match was played ahead of the Seattle Pride weekend by Egypt and Iran, which both announced objections to the label through their respective national associations. As the Pride Match events were planned outside the stadium, FIFA claimed no responsibility and permitted flags representing sexual orientation and gender identity to enter the stadium. The local organizing committee also designated four sites in Seattle for public watch parties in lieu of an official FIFA Fan Fest that had been planned for Seattle Center; viewing areas were set up at Pacific Place, Pier 62, and the Seattle Center campus in a "dispersed model". Nine cities across Washington state were also selected as hosts for official fan zones with watch parties.

Date	Time (UTC−7)	Team	Result	Team	Round	Attendance
June 15, 2026	12:00 pm	Belgium	1–1	Egypt	Group G	66,775
June 19, 2026	12:00 pm	United States	2–0	Australia	Group D	66,925
June 24, 2026	12:00 pm	Bosnia and Herzegovina	3–1	Qatar	Group B	66,925
June 26, 2026	8:00 pm	Egypt	1–1	Iran	Group G	66,925
July 1, 2026	1:00 pm	Belgium	3–2 (a.e.t.)	Senegal	Round of 32	66,925
July 6, 2026	5:00 pm	United States	1–4	Belgium	Round of 16	66,925

== See also ==
- Ice hockey in Seattle
- History of professional soccer in Seattle
- History of the Seattle Mariners
