= List of professional sports teams in Washington (state) =

Washington has four major professional sports teams and several other professional and semi-professional sports teams. All four are based in Seattle, the state's largest city, while most other minor league teams are based in the Seattle or Spokane metropolitan areas. The state also has several college sports programs, including five NCAA Division I schools in various sports.

== Major professional teams ==
Team	Sport	League	Conference	Division	Venue
Seattle Kraken	Ice hockey	National Hockey League	Western Conference	Pacific Division	Climate Pledge Arena
Seattle Mariners	Baseball	Major League Baseball	American League	American League West	T-Mobile Park
Seattle Seahawks	American football	National Football League	National Football Conference	NFC West	Lumen Field
Seattle Sounders FC	Soccer	Major League Soccer	Western Conference		Lumen Field

== Other professional and semi-professional teams ==
Team	Sport	League	Conference	Division	Venue
Ballard FC	Soccer	USL League Two	Western Conference	Northwest Division	Interbay Stadium
Crossfire Redmond	Soccer	National Premier Soccer League	West Region	Northwest Conference	Redmond High School
Everett AquaSox	Baseball	Northwest League			Funko Field
International Portland Select FC	Soccer	National Premier Soccer League	West Region	Northwest Conference	Kiggins Bowl
Oly Town FC	Soccer	USL League Two	Western Conference	Northwest Division	South Sound Stadium
OSA Seattle FC	Soccer	National Premier Soccer League	West Region	Northwest Conference	Starfire Sports
Seattle Cascades	Ultimate	American Ultimate Disc League		West Division	Memorial Stadium
Seattle Orcas	Cricket	Major League Cricket			Marymoor Park
Seattle Reign FC	Soccer	National Women's Soccer League			Lumen Field
Seattle Seawolves	Rugby union	Major League Rugby	Western Conference		Starfire Sports
Seattle Storm	Basketball	Women's National Basketball Association			Climate Pledge Arena
Seattle Tempest	Ultimate	Western Ultimate League			Memorial Stadium
Seattle Thunderbolts	Cricket	Minor League Cricket	Pacific Conference	Western Division	Klahanie Park; Marymoor Park
Seattle Torrent	Ice Hockey	Professional Women's Hockey League	Western Conference		Climate Pledge Arena
Spokane Indians	Baseball	Northwest League			Avista Stadium
Spokane Velocity FC	Soccer	USL League One			ONE Spokane Stadium
Spokane Zephyr FC	Soccer	USL Super League			ONE Spokane Stadium
Tacoma Defiance	Soccer	MLS Next Pro	Western Conference	Pacific Division	Starfire Sports
Tacoma Rainiers	Baseball	Pacific Coast League		West	Cheney Stadium
Tri-City Dust Devils	Baseball	Northwest League			Gesa Stadium
Vancouver Bears	Basketball	United States Basketball League		Pacific Division	Hudson's Bay High School
Washington Wolfpack	Arena football	Arena Football League		West Division	Angel of the Winds Arena

== See also ==
- Sports in Seattle, Washington's largest city
