= Ryōma Watanabe =

Japanese footballer

Personal information
- Full name: Ryōma Watanabe
- Date of birth: 2 October 1996 (age 30)
- Place of birth: Saitama, Japan
- Height: 1.76 m (5 ft 9 in)
- Position: Winger

Team information
- Current team: Urawa Red Diamonds
- Number: 13

Youth career
- 2013–2015: Maebashi Ikuei High School
- 2015–2017: FC Ingolstadt

College career
Years	Team	Apps	(Gls)
2015	Waseda University		

Senior career*
Years	Team	Apps	(Gls)
2017–2018	FC Ingolstadt II	72	(12)
2018–2019	Albirex Niigata	28	(4)
2020	Montedio Yamagata	39	(7)
2021–2024	FC Tokyo	70	(11)
2024–	Urawa Red Diamonds	87	(16)

International career
- Japan U16
2013	Japan U17	2	(3)
2014	Japan U18	4	(0)
- Japan U19
Medal record
Representing Japan
AFC U-16 Championship
Silver medal – second place	2012 Iran
- * Club domestic league appearances and goals as of 10 August 2026

Ryōma Watanabe (渡邊 凌磨, Watanabe Ryōma; born 2 October 1996) is a Japanese football player who plays for Urawa Red Diamonds.

== Playing career ==
Watanabe was born in Saitama Prefecture on 2 October 1996. He joined J2 League club Albirex Niigata in 2018.

== Career statistics ==
As of match played 15 September 2023

Appearances and goals by club, season and competition
Club	Season	League			National cup		League cup		Continental		Total	
Club	Season	Division	Apps	Goals	Apps	Goals	Apps	Goals	Apps	Goals	Apps	Goals
Ingolstadt II	2015–16	Regionalliga Bayern	22	4	—		—		—		22	4
Ingolstadt II	2016–17	Regionalliga Bayern	22	2	—		—		—		22	2
Ingolstadt II	2017–18	Regionalliga Bayern	28	6	—		—		—		28	6
Ingolstadt II	Total		72	12	—		—		—		72	12
Albirex Niigata	2018	J2 League	5	0	0	0	0	0	—		5	0
Albirex Niigata	2019	J2 League	23	4	1	0	0	0	—		24	4
Albirex Niigata	Total		28	4	1	0	0	0	—		29	4
Montedio Yamagata	2020	J1 League	39	7	0	0	0	0	—		39	7
FC Tokyo	2021	J1 League	17	2	0	0	3	0	0	0	20	2
FC Tokyo	2022	J1 League	30	6	2	1	5	0	0	0	37	7
FC Tokyo	2023	J1 League	23	3	2	0	5	0	0	0	30	3
FC Tokyo	Total		70	11	4	1	13	0	0	0	87	12
Career total			209	42	5	1	13	0	0	0	227	43
