= Johan Rojas (footballer) =

Colombian footballer (born 2002)

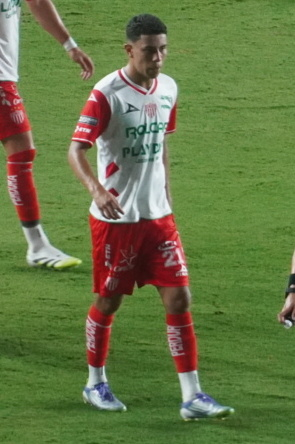
- Rojas with Necaxa in 2025

Personal information
- Full name: Johan Rojas Echevarría
- Date of birth: 20 September 2002 (age 24)
- Place of birth: Medellín, Antioquia, Colombia
- Height: 1.76 m (5 ft 9 in)
- Positions: Winger; attacking midfielder

Team information
- Current team: Vasco da Gama (on loan from Monterrey)
- Number: 10

Youth career
- La Equidad

Senior career*
Years	Team	Apps	(Gls)
2022–2024	La Equidad	64	(7)
2024–	Monterrey	18	(3)
2025	→ Necaxa (loan)	28	(2)
2026–	→ Vasco da Gama (loan)	15	(0)

International career
2023	Colombia U23	2	(0)
- * Club domestic league appearances and goals as of 8 April 2026

Johan Rojas Echevarría (born 20 September 2002) is a Colombian footballer who plays as a midfielder for Campeonato Brasileiro Série A club Vasco da Gama, on loan from Liga MX club Monterrey.

== Club career ==
Rojas began his footballing career at La Equidad, where he made his Categoría Primera A debut on 30 January 2022 in a 1–0 loss against Atlético Nacional. He scored his first goal on 11 April 2023 in a 4–1 win against Once Caldas. He flourished in the 2024 season under the management of Alexis García.

On 9 June 2024, he moved abroad to permanently join Liga MX club Monterrey. After playing mostly as a substitute in his first season at Monterrey, he was subsequently loaned to Necaxa in early 2025. In June 2025, he returned to Monterrey to participate in the Club World Cup before returning to Necaxa to complete the remainder of his one-year loan, despite wanting to stay at Monterrey. On his second Liga MX game back at Necaxa, he scored in a 3–1 win against Querétaro, but was later dropped from the first team preventing him from starting against his parent club.

== International career ==
In 2023, Rojas played for the Colombia national under-23 team.

== Career statistics ==
As of match played 23 August 2025

Appearances and goals by club, season and competition
Club	Season	League			Cup		Continental (Note: Includes Copa Sudamericana)		Other		Total	
Club	Season	Division	Apps	Goals	Apps	Goals	Apps	Goals	Apps	Goals	Apps	Goals
La Equidad	2022	Categoría Primera A	13	0	3	0	2	0	—		18	0
La Equidad	2023	Categoría Primera A	28	5	1	0	—		—		29	5
La Equidad	2024	Categoría Primera A	23	2	0	0	—		—		23	2
La Equidad	Total		64	7	4	0	2	0	0	0	70	7
Monterrey	2024–25	Liga MX	18	3	—		—		4 (Note: Two appearances in Leagues Cup, two appearances in FIFA Club World Cup)	0	20	3
Necaxa (loan)	2024–25	Liga MX	13	1	—		—		—		13	1
Necaxa (loan)	2025–26	Liga MX	5	1	—		—		3 (Note: Appearances in Leagues Cup)	0	8	1
Career total			100	12	4	0	2	0	7	0	113	12
