= Slavko Vinčić =

Slovenian football referee (born 1979)

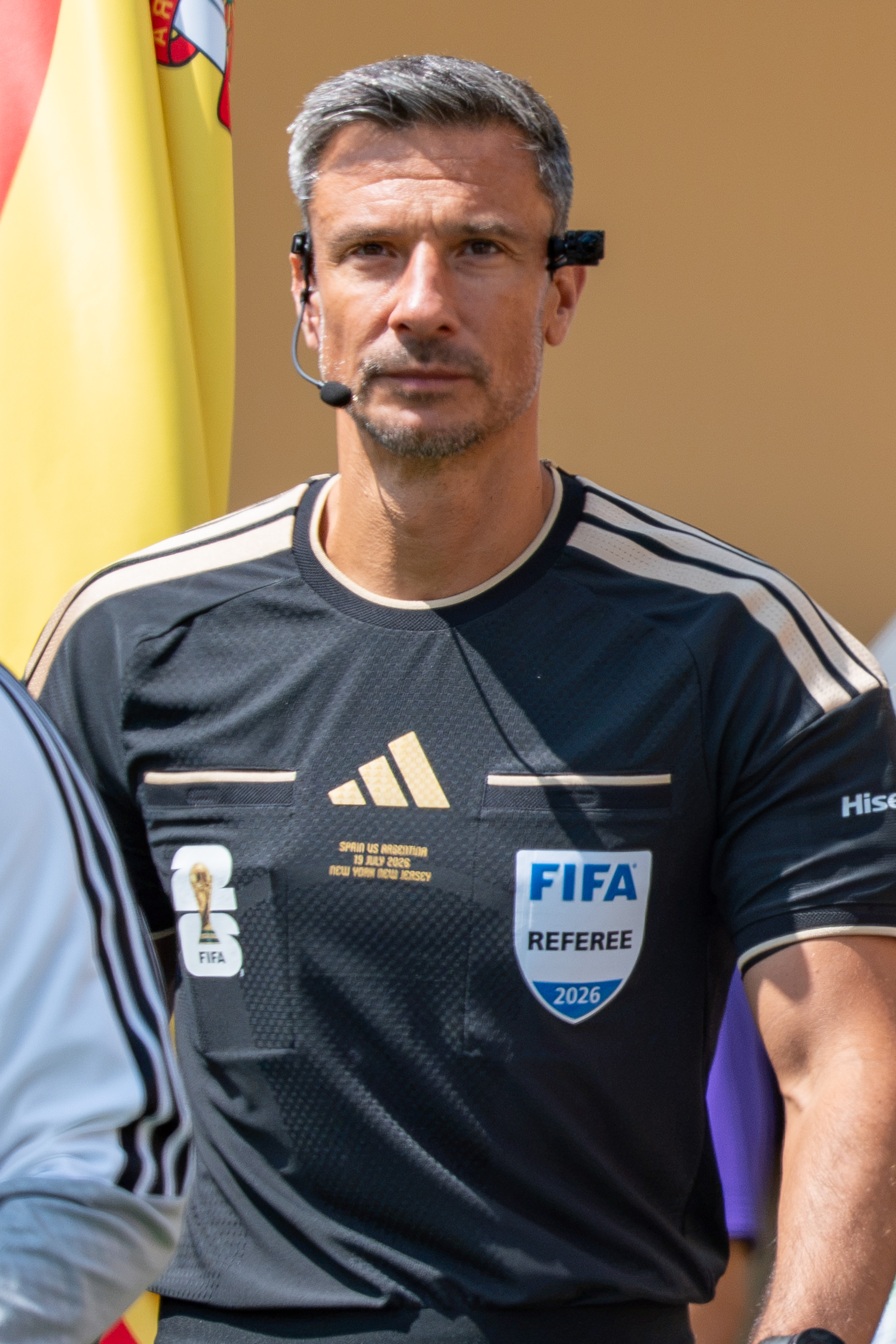
- Vinčić refereeing the 2026 FIFA World Cup final
- Born: 25 November 1979 (age 46); Maribor, SR Slovenia, SFR Yugoslavia

Domestic
Years	League	Role
2007–2026	Slovenian PrvaLiga	Referee

International
Years	League	Role
2010–2026	FIFA listed	Referee

Slavko Vinčić (born 25 November 1979) is a Slovenian former football referee. He was an international-listed referee for FIFA from 2010 to 2026. In Europe, Vinčić oversaw 72 matches for UEFA, including competitions for both the Champions League and Europa League. He refereed two UEFA European Championships and two FIFA World Cups from 2020 to 2026. Vinčić refereed the 2026 World Cup final.

== Career ==
Vinčić's first major competition was UEFA Euro 2012 where he was one of the two additional assistants in the team of Damir Skomina.

He officiated the 2020–21 Champions League quarterfinal between Porto and Chelsea, and the 2020–21 Europa League semifinal between Arsenal and Villarreal.

Vinčić was selected as a match official for Euro 2020, where he was assigned two group stage matches and the quarterfinals clash between Italy and Belgium.

In 2022, he was selected to officiate the 2022 UEFA Europa League final between Eintracht Frankfurt and Rangers.

On 13 May 2024, Vinčić was selected by UEFA to officiate for the 2024 UEFA Champions League final between Borussia Dortmund and Real Madrid.

On 24 February 2025, he was the referee for the Turkish Super League fixture at Rams Park between Fenerbahçe and Galatasaray. The Turkish Football Federation (TFF) requested that a foreign official like Vinčić referee the game after local criticism was brought forward by both clubs and Fenerbahçe coach José Mourinho.

In April 2025, Vinčić was selected to officiate at 2025 FIFA Club World Cup in United States. In a goalless draw between River Plate and Monterrey, Vinčić issued nine yellow cards and a red card for Kevin Castaño, who was already on a yellow card.

Vinčić officiated four matches at the 2026 FIFA World Cup. In a match between Mexico and Ecuador, he issued a red card to Piero Hincapié for covering his mouth while talking to an opposing player in a confrontation. On 16 July 2026, Vinčić was selected to officiate the 2026 FIFA World Cup final between Spain and Argentina. Vinčić is the first Slovenian to referee a World Cup final and was joined by two Slovenian assistant referees. An ESPN analysis found that Vinčić issued three yellow cards per game on average, below the rate found among referees in the previous World Cup. During the final, Vinčic showed six yellow cards and sent off Argentinian player Enzo Fernández for a second bookable offense.

He was named that year's best World Cup referee by the IFFHS. Shortly after the World Cup, Vinčić retired from international refereeing on 26 July 2026.

== Selected international matches refereed ==
UEFA Euro 2020 – Multiple hosts
Date	Match	Venue	Location	Round	Result	Yellow cards	Red cards
14 June 2021	Spain – Sweden	Estadio de La Cartuja	Seville	Group stage	0–0	1	0
20 June 2021	Switzerland – Turkey	Olympic Stadium	Baku	Group stage	3–1	4	0
2 July 2021	Belgium – Italy	Allianz Arena	Munich	Quarter-finals	1–2	3	0
2022 FIFA World Cup – Qatar
Date	Match	Venue	Location	Round	Result	Yellow cards	Red cards
22 November 2022	Argentina – Saudi Arabia	Lusail Stadium	Lusail	Group stage	1–2	6	0
29 November 2022	Wales – England	Ahmad bin Ali Stadium	Al Rayyan	Group stage	0–3	2	0
UEFA Euro 2024 – Germany
Date	Match	Venue	Location	Round	Result	Yellow cards	Red cards
15 June 2024	Hungary – Switzerland	RheinEnergieStadion	Cologne	Group stage	1–3	5	0
20 June 2024	Spain – Italy	Arena AufSchalke	Gelsenkirchen	Group stage	1–0	5	0
9 July 2024	Spain – France	Allianz Arena	Munich	Semi finals	2–1	4	0
2026 FIFA World Cup – Canada / United States / Mexico
Date	Match	Venue	Location	Round	Result	Yellow cards	Red cards
13 June 2026	Brazil – Morocco	MetLife Stadium	East Rutherford	Group stage	1–1	2	0
22 June 2026	Jordan – Algeria	Levi's Stadium	Santa Clara	Group stage	1–2	2	0
30 June 2026	Mexico – Ecuador	Estadio Azteca	Mexico City	Round of 32	2–0	3	1
19 July 2026	Spain – Argentina	MetLife Stadium	East Rutherford	Final	1–0	7	1

== Major club matches refereed ==
Date	Match	Tournament	Venue	Result	Ref
18 May 2022	Eintracht Frankfurt vs. Rangers	2022 UEFA Europa League final	Estadio Ramón Sánchez Pizjuán, Seville	1–1 a.e.t. (5–4 on penalties)	
1 June 2024	Borussia Dortmund vs. Real Madrid	2024 UEFA Champions League final	Wembley Stadium, London	0–2	

== See also ==
- List of football referees
