= Germán Berterame =

Argentine-Mexican footballer (born 1998)

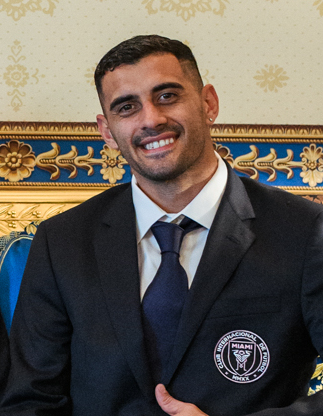
- Berterame with Inter Miami at the White House in 2026

Personal information
- Full name: Germán Berterame
- Date of birth: 13 November 1998 (age 27)
- Place of birth: Villa María, Argentina
- Height: 1.80 m (5 ft 11 in)
- Position: Striker

Team information
- Current team: Inter Miami
- Number: 19

Senior career*
Years	Team	Apps	(Gls)
2016–2019	San Lorenzo	7	(0)
2019	→ Patronato (loan)	10	(3)
2019–2022	Atlético San Luis	90	(31)
2022	Atlético Madrid	0	(0)
2022–2026	Monterrey	114	(50)
2026–	Inter Miami	17	(7)

International career^{‡}
2015	Argentina U17	12	(3)
2024–	Mexico	11	(2)
- * Club domestic league appearances and goals as of 25 July 2026 ‡ National team caps and goals as of 29 September 2026

Germán "Berte" Berterame (born 13 November 1998) is a professional footballer who plays as a striker for Major League Soccer club Inter Miami. Born in Argentina, he represents the Mexico national team.

== Career ==
Berterame began his professional career with San Lorenzo, progressing through the youth system before making his first-team debut in April 2016 in a Copa Libertadores match against L.D.U. Quito. In January 2019, he joined Patronato on a season-long loan.

In July 2019, he transferred to Atlético San Luis, marking the beginning of his career in Mexican football. Over his time with the club, he scored 31 goals and provided seven assists. In the Apertura 2022 tournament, he finished as joint top scorer with nine goals, sharing the honor with Nicolás López.

In June 2022, Berterame joined La Liga side Atlético Madrid on a free transfer, but just three weeks later he moved to Monterrey in a deal worth €8 million, with Atlético retaining a percentage.

In July 2024, Berterame completed the naturalization process and became eligible to represent the Mexico national team. Three months later, he received his first call-up and made his international debut on October 16 in a friendly match against the United States.

In January 2026, Inter Miami reached an agreement to sign Berterame for a reported fee of $15 million. Later that year, on 12 April, he scored his first goal in a 2–2 draw with New York Red Bulls. On 25 July 2026, Berterame suffered a serious head injury during an away match against CF Montréal after being struck in the head by an elbow from Efrain Morales while challenging for the ball. He was rendered unconscious and was taken from the field by ambulance to Montreal General Hospital. The following day, Inter Miami confirmed that Berterame had been discharged from the hospital after overnight observation. The club stated that he had also sustained injuries to his left shoulder and nose and would begin his recovery under the supervision of the club's medical staff, with his return dependent on his rehabilitation progress.

== Career statistics ==
=== International ===
As of match played on 29 September 2026

Appearances and goals by national team and year
National team	Year	Apps	Goals
Mexico	2024	1	0
Mexico	2025	5	1
Mexico	2026	5	1
Total		11	2

Scores and results list Mexico's goal tally first.

List of international goals scored by Germán Berterame
No.	Date	Venue	Opponent	Score	Result	Competition
1	14 October 2025	Estadio Akron, Zapopan, Mexico	Ecuador	1–0	1–1	Friendly
2	25 January 2026	Estadio Ramón Tahuichi Aguilera, Santa Cruz de la Sierra, Bolivia	Bolivia	1–0	1–0	Friendly

== Honours ==
Inter Miami

- Campeones Cup: 2026

Individual

- Liga MX Golden Boot: Apertura 2021 (shared)
- Liga MX All-Star: 2022, 2024
