= Ricardo Chávez (footballer) =

Mexican footballer (born 1994)

Personal information
- Full name: Ricardo Chávez Soto
- Date of birth: 19 November 1994 (age 31)
- Place of birth: Ciudad Victoria, Tamaulipas, Mexico
- Height: 1.75 m (5 ft 9 in)
- Position: Right-back

Team information
- Current team: Monterrey
- Number: 2

Youth career
- 2011–2014: UANL

Senior career*
Years	Team	Apps	(Gls)
2014–2016	UANL	0	(0)
2016–2017	→ UAT (loan)	30	(3)
2017–2018	→ Sonora (loan)	27	(0)
2018–2019	Juárez	17	(0)
2019–2020	Necaxa	42	(0)
2021–2024	Atlético San Luis	143	(6)
2025–	Monterrey	64	(4)

International career^{‡}
2023	Mexico	1	(0)
- * Club domestic league appearances and goals as of 14 November 2026 ‡ National team caps and goals as of 16 December 2023

Ricardo Chávez Soto (born 19 November 1994) is a Mexican professional footballer who plays as a right-back for Liga MX club Monterrey.

== International career ==
Chávez made his debut for the senior national team on 16 December 2023, in a friendly against Colombia.
