= Jordi Cortizo =

Mexican footballer (born 1996)

- Cortizo with León in 2026

Personal information
- Full name: Jordi Cortizo de la Piedra
- Date of birth: 30 June 1996 (age 30)
- Place of birth: Querétaro, Mexico
- Height: 1.83 m (6 ft 0 in)
- Position: Midfielder

Team information
- Current team: León
- Number: 16

Youth career
- 2013–2016: Querétaro

Senior career*
Years	Team	Apps	(Gls)
2016–2019	Querétaro	50	(1)
2020–2022	Tijuana	37	(2)
2021–2022	→ Puebla (loan)	14	(1)
2022	Puebla	20	(5)
2023–2025	Monterrey	77	(7)
2025–	León	38	(2)

International career^{‡}
2023–2024	Mexico	5	(0)
- * Club domestic league appearances and goals as of 21 November 2026 ‡ National team caps and goals as of 30 June 2024

Jordi Cortizo de la Piedra (born 30 June 1996) is a Mexican professional footballer who plays as a midfielder for Liga MX club León.

== Club career ==
=== Tijuana ===
In June 2020, Cortizo was transferred to Tijuana.

=== Puebla ===
Cortizo joined Puebla on a one-year loan ahead of the Clausura 2022.

=== Monterrey ===
In December 2022, Cortizo moved to Monterrey.

=== León ===
In August 2025, he joined León.

== International career ==
In August 2023, Cortizo received his first call-up to the senior national team by head coach Jaime Lozano, for two friendly matches against Australia and Uzbekistan.

== Career statistics ==
=== Club ===
As of match played on 21 November 2026

Appearances and goals by club, season and competition
Club	Season	League			Cup		Continental		Global		Other		Total	
Club	Season	Division	Apps	Goals	Apps	Goals	Apps	Goals	Apps	Goals	Apps	Goals	Apps	Goals
Querétaro	2015–16	Liga MX	—		—		1 (Note: Appearances in CONCACAF Champions Cup)	0	—		—		1	0
Querétaro	2016–17	Liga MX	—		2	0	—		—		—		2	0
Querétaro	2017–18	Liga MX	15	1	10	1	—		—		—		25	2
Querétaro	2018–19	Liga MX	20	0	8	0	—		—		—		28	0
Querétaro	2019–20	Liga MX	15	0	5	2	—		—		—		20	2
Querétaro	Total		50	1	25	3	1	0	—		—		76	4
Tijuana	2019–20	Liga MX	—		2	0	—		—		—		2	0
Tijuana	2020–21	Liga MX	26	2	—		—		—		—		26	2
Tijuana	2021–22	Liga MX	11	0	—		—		—		—		11	0
Tijuana	Total		37	2	2	0	—		—		—		39	2
Puebla (loan)	2021–22	Liga MX	14	1	—		—		—		—		14	1
Puebla	2022–23	Liga MX	20	5	—		—		—		—		20	5
Monterrey	2022–23	Liga MX	21	1	—		—		—		—		21	1
Monterrey	2023–24	Liga MX	29	4	—		7	0	—		7 (Note: Appearances in Leagues Cup)	1	43	5
Monterrey	2024–25	Liga MX	26	2	—		4	2	—		2	0	32	4
Monterrey	2025–26	Liga MX	1	0	—		—		2 (Note: Appearances in FIFA Club World Cup)	0	1	0	4	0
Monterrey	Total		77	7	—		11	2	2	0	10	1	100	10
León	2025–26	Liga MX	25	0	—		—		—		—		25	0
León	2026–27	Liga MX	13	2	—		—		—		6	0	19	2
León	Total		38	2	—		—		—		6	0	44	2
Career total			236	18	27	3	12	2	2	0	16	1	293	24

=== International ===
As of match played on 30 June 2024

Appearances and goals by national team and year
National team	Year	Apps	Goals
Mexico	2023	3	0
Mexico	2024	2	0
Total		5	0
