= Jorge Rodríguez (footballer, born 1995) =

Argentine footballer

Personal information
- Full name: Jorge Agustín Rodríguez
- Date of birth: 15 September 1995 (age 31)
- Place of birth: Mendoza, Argentina
- Height: 1.76 m (5 ft 9 in)
- Positions: Defensive midfielder; centre-back

Team information
- Current team: Monterrey
- Number: 30

Youth career
- Banfield

Senior career*
Years	Team	Apps	(Gls)
2014–2021	Banfield	120	(1)
2021–2023	Estudiantes	102	(2)
2024–	Monterrey	91	(3)
- * Club domestic league appearances and goals as of 17:37, 3 May 2025 (UTC)

Jorge Agustín Rodríguez (born 15 September 1995), commonly known as "Corcho Rodríguez", is an Argentine professional footballer who plays as a defensive midfielder or centre-back for Liga MX club Monterrey.

== Career ==
Rodríguez got his career underway with Argentine Primera División side Banfield in 2014, making his debut in a 3–0 defeat to Godoy Cruz on 8 August. He made a total of seventeen appearances for Banfield in his first three seasons.

On February 3, 2021, Rodríguez signed a three-year contract with Argentine Primera División side Estudiantes.

== Career statistics ==
As of 15 May 2018

Club statistics
Club	Season	League			National cup (Note: Includes the Copa Argentina)		League cup		Continental (Note: Includes the Copa Sudamericana)		Other		Total	
Club	Season	Division	Apps	Goals	Apps	Goals	Apps	Goals	Apps	Goals	Apps	Goals	Apps	Goals
Banfield	2014	Primera División	2	0	0	0	—		—		0	0	2	0
Banfield	2015	Primera División	6	0	0	0	—		—		0	0	6	0
Banfield	2016	Primera División	9	0	1	0	—		—		0	0	10	0
Banfield	2016–17	Primera División	26	0	2	0	—		2 (Note: Two appearances in 2016 Copa Sudamericana)	1 (Note: One goal in 2016 Copa Sudamericana)	0	0	30	1
Banfield	2017–18	Primera División	25	0	2	0	—		4	0	0	0	31	0
Career total			68	0	5	0	—		6	1	0	0	79	1

== Honours ==
Estudiantes

- Copa Argentina: 2023
