= Apertura 2017 Copa MX =

Apertura 2017 Copa Corona MX

Tournament details
- Country: Mexico
- Teams: 27

Final positions
- Champions: Monterrey (2nd title)
- Runners-up: Pachuca

Tournament statistics
- Matches played: 69
- Goals scored: 165 (2.39 per match)
- Attendance: 1,025,826 (14,867 per match)
- Top goal scorer(s): Carlos Sánchez (4 goals)

The Apertura 2017 Copa MX (officially the Apertura 2017 Copa Corona MX for sponsorship reasons) was the 78th staging of the Copa MX, the 50th staging in the professional era and is the eleventh tournament played since the 1996–97 edition.

This tournament began on 25 July 2017 and was originally scheduled to end on 1 November 2017. Due to the 2017 Puebla earthquake, the tournament was postponed in the Round of 16 phase, pushing the end of the tournament to 21 December 2017.

The final was held at Estadio BBVA Bancomer in the Monterrey suburb of Guadalupe with the home team Monterrey defeating Pachuca 1–0 to win their second title.

As winners, Monterrey earned a spot to face the winners of the Clausura 2018 edition, in the 2018 Supercopa MX.

== Participants ==
The tournament will feature all Liga MX clubs (excluding recently promoted Lobos BUAP) as well as ten Ascenso MX clubs.

Due to the new format of the CONCACAF Champions League, Mexican clubs do not begin their participation until February, thus the teams qualified to 2017–18 CONCACAF Champions League (América, Guadalajara, Tijuana, UANL) will participate in this season's Copa MX.

Location of the participating teams.
Red: Liga MX clubs; Blue: Ascenso MX clubs

== Draw ==
The draw for the tournament took place on June 6, 2017, in Cancún, Quintana Roo, Mexico. 27 teams were drawn into nine groups of three, with each group containing one team from each of the three pots.

Clubs in Pot 1 were drawn to be the seed of each group according to the order of their drawing. That is, the first club that was drawn is seed of Group 1, the second drawn is seed of Group 2 and so on and so on. The Liga MX teams in Pot 1 are the teams who ended 1–5 in the 2016–17 Liga MX Aggregate table The Ascenso MX teams in Pot 1 are the four best possible teams in the 2016–17 Ascenso MX Aggregate table. Zacatepec Siglo XXI who ended fourth, were replaced by Oaxaca, who ended fifth, due to the club's disappearance.

Pot 2 contained Liga MX clubs who ended 6–9 in the Aggregate table and Ascenso MX clubs who ended 6–10 in the Aggregate table. Coras, who ended tenth in the Aggregate table, moved to Zacatepec, Morelos and became the new Zacatepec franchise.

Pot 3 contained Liga MX clubs who ended 10–17 in the Aggregate table. UDG, who ended twelfth in the Ascenso MX Aggregate table, replaced recently promoted Lobos BUAP.

=== Teams ===
Pot 1
Guadalajara (LMX)	Monterrey (LMX)	Oaxaca (AMX)
Pachuca (LMX)	Sinaloa (AMX)	Tijuana (LMX)
UAEM (AMX)	UANL (LMX)	Zacatecas (AMX)
Pot 2
América (LMX)	Atlante (AMX)	Zacatepec (AMX)
Celaya (AMX)	Juárez (AMX)	León (LMX)
Necaxa (LMX)	Sonora (AMX)	Toluca (LMX)
Pot 3
Atlas (LMX)	Cruz Azul (LMX)	Morelia (LMX)
Puebla (LMX)	Querétaro (LMX)	Santos Laguna (LMX)
UdeG (AMX)	UNAM (LMX)	Veracruz (LMX)

== Tiebreakers ==
If two or more clubs are equal on points on completion of the group matches, the following criteria are applied to determine the rankings:

1. superior goal difference;
2. higher number of goals scored;
3. scores of the group matches played among the clubs in question;
4. higher number of goals scored away in the group matches played among the clubs in question;
5. fair play ranking;
6. drawing of lots.

== Group stage ==
Every group is composed of three clubs, each group has at least one club from Liga MX and Ascenso MX

=== Group 1 ===
Pos	Team	Pld	W	D	L	GF	GA	GD	Pts	Qualification
1	Toluca	4	4	0	0	11	1	+10	12	Advance to knockout stage
2	UdeG	4	2	0	2	5	6	−1	6	Advance to knockout stage
3	Sinaloa	4	0	0	4	1	10	−9	0	

Source: Copa MX
Rules for classification: Tiebreakers
25 July 2017
18:00

Sinaloa	0–2	UdeG
	Report	Vázquez 44' (pen.), 48'

Estadio Banorte, Culiacán
Attendance: 3,103
Referee: Edgar Ulises Rangel

1 August 2017
21:00

Toluca	3–0	Sinaloa
Triverio 28', 79'; Esquivel 90+1'	Report

Estadio Nemesio Díez, Toluca
Attendance: 15,027
Referee: Miguel Ángel Chacón

9 August 2017
21:00

UdeG	0–2	Toluca
		Abundiz 16'; Delgadillo 90+5'

Estadio Jalisco, Guadalajara
Attendance: 4,040
Referee: Saul Fernando Orozco

16 August 2017
18:00

Sinaloa	1–2	Toluca
Monreal 49'	Report	Canelo 34'; Sambueza 54'

Estadio Banorte, Culiacán
Attendance: 3,223
Referee: Edgar Allan Morales

30 August 2017
20:30

Toluca	4–0	UdeG
Barrientos 9'; Abundiz 41'; Velarde 77'; Canelo 80'	Report

Estadio Nemesio Díez, Toluca
Attendance: 14,096
Referee: José Luis Báez

12 September 2017
19:00

UdeG	3–0 (Note: The UdeG v Sinaloa match resulted in a 2–1 victory for Sinaloa, but was later ruled a victory for UdeG due to Sinaloa missing a registered Ascenso MX player.)	Sinaloa
	Report

Estadio Jalisco, Guadalajara
Attendance: 901
Referee: Ángel Monroy Bello

=== Group 2 ===
Pos	Team	Pld	W	D	L	GF	GA	GD	Pts	Qualification
1	Monterrey	4	3	1	0	8	2	+6	10	Advance to knockout stage
2	UNAM	4	1	2	1	4	5	−1	5	
3	Celaya	4	0	1	3	1	6	−5	1	

Source: Copa MX
Rules for classification: Tiebreakers
26 July 2017
19:00

Monterrey	3–0	Celaya
A. González 52'; Funes Mori 78'; C. Sánchez 83'	Report

Estadio BBVA Bancomer, Guadalupe
Attendance: 23,673
Referee: Roberto Rios Jácome

1 August 2017
19:00

Celaya	1–1	UNAM
De la Tejera 66'	Report	Quintana 78'

Estadio Miguel Alemán Valdés, Celaya
Attendance: 13,400
Referee: Victor Cáceres

9 August 2017
20:30

UNAM	1–1	Monterrey
Gallardo 90+2'	Report	Benítez 28'

Estadio Olímpico Universitario, Mexico City
Attendance: 9,248
Referee: Adonai Escobedo González

15 August 2017
19:00

Celaya	0–1	Monterrey
	Report	Funes Mori 72'

Estadio Miguel Alemán Valdés, Celaya
Attendance: 7,718
Referee: Saúl Alfredo Silva

3 September 2017 (Note: The UNAM v Celaya was originally scheduled for 31 August but was postponed due to torrential rain.)
12:00

UNAM	1–0	Celaya
Guerrón 64'	Report

Estadio Olímpico Universitario, Mexico City
Attendance: 6,030
Referee: Miguel Ángel Chacón

13 September 2017
20:30

Monterrey	3–1	UNAM
Hurtado 21'; Juárez 26'; Benítez 63'	Report	Formica 36'

Estadio BBVA Bancomer, Guadalupe
Attendance: 31,257
Referee: Adonai Escobedo

=== Group 3 ===
Pos	Team	Pld	W	D	L	GF	GA	GD	Pts	Qualification
1	América	4	3	0	1	7	4	+3	9	Advance to knockout stage
2	Atlas	4	3	0	1	5	4	+1	9	Advance to knockout stage
3	UAEM	4	0	0	4	5	9	−4	0	

Source: Copa MX
Rules for classification: Tiebreakers
25 July 2017
21:00

Atlas	2–1	UAEM
Tabó 48' (pen.); Vargas 55' (o.g.)	Report	Gama 67'

Estadio Jalisco, Guadalajara
Attendance: 12,375
Referee: Arturo Cruz Hurtado

2 August 2017
20:30

América	0–1	Atlas
	Report	Barraza 68'

Estadio Azteca, Mexico City
Attendance: 21,796
Referee: Adonaí Escobedo

8 August 2017
21:00

América	2–1	UAEM
Romero 34' (pen.), 80'	Report	Morales 19'

Estadio Azteca, Mexico City
Attendance: 19,264
Referee: Miguel Ángel Chacón

15 August 2017
20:30

UAEM	2–3	América
Hipólito 8'; Morales 20'	Report	Pab. Aguilar 39', 90+1'; Romero 77'

Estadio Alberto "Chivo" Córdoba, Toluca
Attendance: 30,898
Referee: Ángel Monroy Bello

30 August 2017
19:00

Atlas	0–2	América
	Report	William 23'; Quintero 83' (pen.)

Estadio Jalisco, Guadalajara
Attendance: 26,966
Referee: Diego Montaño

12 September 2017
19:00

UAEM	1–2	Atlas
Ustari 54' (o.g.)	Report	Barraza 34'; Martínez 90+15'

Estadio Alberto "Chivo" Córdoba, Toluca
Attendance: 3,568
Referee: Aldo Cano Martínez

=== Group 4 ===
Pos	Team	Pld	W	D	L	GF	GA	GD	Pts	Qualification
1	Tijuana	4	1	3	0	3	2	+1	6	Advance to knockout stage
2	Atlante	4	1	2	1	3	2	+1	5	Advance to knockout stage
3	Puebla	4	1	1	2	2	4	−2	4	

Source: Copa MX
Rules for classification: Tiebreakers
25 July 2017
19:00

Puebla	1–0	Atlante
Salom 43'	Report

Estadio Cuauhtémoc, Puebla
Attendance: 5,156
Referee: Eduardo Galvan Basulto

1 August 2017
19:00

Tijuana	1–0	Puebla
Arriola 7'	Report

Estadio Caliente, Tijuana
Attendance: 27,333

8 August 2017
19:00

Atlante	1–1	Tijuana
Cauich 90+5'	Report	Lucero 26'

Estadio Andrés Quintana Roo, Cancún
Attendance: 1,425
Referee: Adalid Maganda Villalva

15 August 2017
19:00

Puebla	1–1	Tijuana
Míguez 43'	Report	Núñez 44'

Estadio Cuauhtémoc, Puebla
Attendance: 2,616
Referee: León Vicente Barajas

29 August 2017
19:00

Tijuana	0–0	Atlante
	Report

Estadio Caliente, Tijuana
Attendance: 24,333
Referee: Arturo Cruz Hirtado

13 September 2017
19:00

Atlante	2–0	Puebla
F. Uscanga 35' (pen.); Cardozo 37'	Report

Estadio Andrés Quintana Roo, Cancún
Attendance: 1,409
Referee: Jesús Bisguerra Mendiola

=== Group 5 ===
Pos	Team	Pld	W	D	L	GF	GA	GD	Pts	Qualification
1	Cruz Azul	4	2	2	0	5	3	+2	8	Advance to knockout stage
2	Zacatepec	4	2	1	1	6	4	+2	7	Advance to knockout stage
3	UANL	4	0	1	3	4	8	−4	1	

Source: Copa MX
Rules for classification: Tiebreakers
26 July 2017
18:45

Zacatepec	1–1	Cruz Azul
Zendejas 51'	Report	Zúñiga 23'

Estadio Agustín "Coruco" Díaz, Zacatepec
Attendance: 21,863
Referee: Oscar Mejia Garcia

2 August 2017
21:00

UANL	1–1	Cruz Azul
Sosa 76'	Report	Mora 80'

Estadio Universitario, San Nicolás de los Garza
Attendance: 37,322
Referee: Roberto Ríos

8 August 2017
19:00

Zacatepec	2–1	UANL
A. González 18'; Márquez 29' (pen.)	Report	Álvarez 79'

Estadio Agustín "Coruco" Díaz, Zacatepec
Attendance: 20,659
Referee: Mario Humberto Vargas

15 August 2017
21:00

Cruz Azul	1–0	Zacatepec
Cauteruccio 42'	Report

Estadio Azul, Mexico City
Attendance: 8,021
Referee: Aldo Cano

30 August 2017
21:00

Cruz Azul	2–1	UANL
Cauteruccio 81'; Mora 90+2'	Report	Gignac 24'

Estadio Azul, Mexico City
Attendance: 9,301
Referee: Eduardo Galván Basulto

12 September 2017
21:00

UANL	1–3	Zacatepec
Gignac 88'	Report	Márquez 1', 87'; Ivanobski 60'

Estadio Universitario, San Nicolás de los Garza
Attendance: 33,790
Referee: Diego Montaño Robles

=== Group 6 ===
Pos	Team	Pld	W	D	L	GF	GA	GD	Pts	Qualification
1	León	4	4	0	0	8	3	+5	12	Advance to knockout stage
2	Veracruz	4	1	0	3	4	6	−2	3	
3	Oaxaca	4	1	0	3	4	7	−3	3	

Source: Copa MX
Rules for classification: Tiebreakers
25 July 2017
21:00

León	3–2	Oaxaca
Pereyra Díaz 52', 69'; Boselli 79'	Report	Zúñiga 6'; Guarch 10'

Estadio León, León
Attendance: 7,440
Referee: Alejandro Funk Villafañe

2 August 2017
19:00

Oaxaca	1–0	Veracruz
Noya 34'	Report

Estadio Tecnológico de Oaxaca, Oaxaca
Attendance: 5,847
Referee: José Luis Báez

9 August 2017
19:00

Veracruz	1–2	León
Díaz 45'	Report	Ramos 32'; Andrade 63'

Estadio Luis "Pirata" Fuente, Veracruz
Attendance: 1,901
Referee: Diego Montaño Robles

16 August 2017
19:00

León	2–0	Veracruz
Ramos 4'; Cerato 19'	Report

Estadio León, León
Attendance: 6,826
Referee: Eduardo Galván

30 August 2017
19:00

Oaxaca	0–1	León
	Report	C. González 73'

Estadio Tecnológico de Oaxaca, Oaxaca
Attendance: 6,127
Referee: Christian Ramírez

12 September 2017
19:00

Veracruz	3–1	Oaxaca
Holgado 16', 41', 53'	Report	Castellanos 39'

Estadio Luis "Pirata" Fuente, Veracruz
Attendance: 1,072
Referee: Miguel Ángel Chacón

=== Group 7 ===
Pos	Team	Pld	W	D	L	GF	GA	GD	Pts	Qualification
1	Santos Laguna	4	3	0	1	7	1	+6	9	Advance to knockout stage
2	Guadalajara	4	3	0	1	6	4	+2	9	Advance to knockout stage
3	Juárez	4	0	0	4	2	10	−8	0	

Source: Copa MX
Rules for classification: Tiebreakers
26 July 2017
18:55

Santos Laguna	2–0	Guadalajara
Rodríguez 67' (pen.); Furch 70' (pen.)	Report

Estadio Corona, Torreón
Attendance: 17,373
Referee: Fernando Hernandez Gomez

2 August 2017
21:00

Guadalajara	4–2	Juárez
Marín 19'; Beltrán 45+3'; Benítez 51'; Pineda 74' (pen.)	Report	Prieto 33'; Lucas 38'

Estadio Chivas, Zapopan
Attendance: 20,154
Referee: León Vicente Barajas

9 August 2017
20:00

Juárez	0–1	Guadalajara
		Macías 12'

Estadio Olímpico Benito Juárez, Ciudad Juárez
Attendance: 19,583
Referee: Uriel Olvera Rios

15 August 2017
21:00

Santos Laguna	2–0	Juárez
Armenteros 45'; Lozano 65'	Report

Estadio Corona, Torreón
Attendance: 12,810
Referee: Arturo Cruz Hurtado

29 August 2017
21:00

Guadalajara	1–0	Santos Laguna
Zaldívar 85'	Report

Estadio Chivas, Zapopan
Attendance: 12,591
Referee: Jonathan Hernández

13 September 2017
20:00

Juárez	0–3	Santos Laguna
	Report	Cisneros 14', 17', 62'

Estadio Olímpico Benito Juárez, Ciudad Juárez
Attendance: 9,747
Referee: Oscar Mejía García

=== Group 8 ===
Pos	Team	Pld	W	D	L	GF	GA	GD	Pts	Qualification
1	Pachuca	4	3	1	0	4	1	+3	10	Advance to knockout stage
2	Querétaro	4	1	2	1	4	3	+1	5	Advance to knockout stage
3	Sonora	4	0	1	3	3	7	−4	1	

Source: Copa MX
Rules for classification: Tiebreakers
25 July 2017
19:00

Querétaro	2–0	Sonora
Candelo 53'; Camilo 80'	Report

Estadio Corregidora, Querétaro
Attendance: 11,073
Referee: Eduardo Galvan Basulto

1 August 2017
19:00

Sonora	0–1	Pachuca
	Report	Cano 60'

Estadio Héroe de Nacozari, Hermosillo
Attendance: 9,175
Referee: Juan Ramírez

9 August 2017
19:00

Pachuca	0–0	Querétaro
	Report

Estadio Hidalgo, Pachuca
Attendance: 12,739
Referee: Marco Antonio Ortiz

15 August 2017
19:00

Querétaro	0–1	Pachuca
	Report	Peña 90+3'

Estadio Corregidora, Querétaro
Attendance: 19,032
Referee: Diego Montaño Robles

29 August 2017
19:00

Sonora	2–2	Querétaro
Ramírez 69'; Villa 90'	Report	Esqueda 40' (pen.); Yrizar 74'

Estadio Héroe de Nacozari, Hermosillo
Attendance: 5,387
Referee: Brian Omar González

12 September 2017
19:00

Pachuca	2–1	Sonora
Cano 16'; González 69'	Report	Guajardo 15' (pen.)

Estadio Hidalgo, Pachuca
Attendance: 7,458
Referee: León Vicente Barajas

=== Group 9 ===
Pos	Team	Pld	W	D	L	GF	GA	GD	Pts	Qualification
1	Morelia	4	3	1	0	7	4	+3	10	Advance to knockout stage
2	Necaxa	4	2	1	1	8	4	+4	7	Advance to knockout stage
3	Zacatecas	4	0	0	4	3	10	−7	0	

Source: Copa MX
Rules for classification: Tiebreakers
25 July 2017
21:00

Morelia	2–1	Zacatecas
López 4' (o.g.); Ortiz 73'	Report	Hernández 12'

Estadio Morelos, Morelia
Attendance: 8,976
Referee: Adonai Escobedo Gonzalez

1 August 2017
19:00

Zacatecas	1–2	Necaxa
Nurse 61'	Report	Ponce 45'; Velázquez 79'

Estadio Francisco Villa, Zacatecas
Attendance: 5,643
Referee: Christian Adrián Ramírez

8 August 2017
21:00

Necaxa	1–1	Morelia
D. Hernández 18'	Report	F. Pérez 71'

Estadio Victoria, Aguascalientes
Attendance: 6,565
Referee: Fernando Hernández Gómez

16 August 2017
19:00

Necaxa	4–0	Zacatecas
Barragán 4', 9' (pen.); Dávila 66'; Villalpando 76'	Report

Estadio Victoria, Aguascalientes
Attendance: 2,780
Referee: Roberto Ríos

30 August 2017
19:00

Zacatecas	1–2	Morelia
Martínez 62'	Report	J. P. Rodríguez 4'; Sepúlveda 13'

Estadio Francisco Villa, Zacatecas
Attendance: 624
Referee: Juan Andrés Esquivel

12 September 2017
21:00

Morelia	2–1	Necaxa
Cuero 15'; Sepúlveda 74'	Report	Barragán 75'

Estadio Morelos, Morelia
Attendance: 11,647
Referee: Marco Antonio Ortiz

=== Ranking of second-placed teams ===
Pos	Grp	Team	Pld	W	D	L	GF	GA	GD	Pts	Qualification
1	7	Guadalajara	4	3	0	1	6	4	+2	9	Advance to knockout stage
2	3	Atlas	4	3	0	1	5	4	+1	9	Advance to knockout stage
3	9	Necaxa	4	2	1	1	8	4	+4	7	Advance to knockout stage
4	5	Zacatepec	4	2	1	1	6	4	+2	7	Advance to knockout stage
5	1	UdeG	4	2	0	2	5	6	−1	6	Advance to knockout stage
6	8	Querétaro	4	1	2	1	4	3	+1	5	Advance to knockout stage
7	4	Atlante	4	1	2	1	3	2	+1	5	Advance to knockout stage
8	2	UNAM	4	1	2	1	4	5	−1	5	
9	6	Veracruz	4	1	0	3	4	6	−2	3	

Source: Copa MX
Rules for classification: Tiebreakers

== Knockout stage ==
- The clubs that advance to this stage will be ranked and seeded 1 to 16 based on performance in the group stage. In case of ties, the same tiebreakers used to rank the runners-up will be used.
- All rounds are played in a single game. If a game ends in a draw, it will proceed directly to a penalty shoot-out. The highest seeded club will host each match, regardless of which division each club belongs.
- The winners of the groups and the seven best second place teams of each group will advance to the Knockout stage.

=== Qualified teams ===
The nine group winners and the seven best runners-up from the group stage qualify for the final stage.

Group	Winners	Runners-up
1	Toluca	UdeG
2	Monterrey	—
3	América	Atlas
4	Tijuana	Atlante
5	Cruz Azul	Zacatepec
6	León	—
7	Santos Laguna	Guadalajara
8	Pachuca	Querétaro
9	Morelia	Necaxa

=== Seeding ===
Seed	Grp	Team	Pld	W	D	L	GF	GA	GD	Pts
1	1	Toluca	4	4	0	0	11	1	+10	12
2	6	León	4	4	0	0	8	3	+5	12
3	2	Monterrey	4	3	1	0	8	2	+6	10
4	9	Morelia	4	3	1	0	7	4	+3	10
5	8	Pachuca	4	3	1	0	4	1	+3	10
6	7	Santos Laguna	4	3	0	1	7	1	+6	9
7	3	América	4	3	0	1	7	4	+3	9
8	7	Guadalajara	4	3	0	1	6	4	+2	9
9	3	Atlas	4	3	0	1	5	4	+1	9
10	5	Cruz Azul	4	2	2	0	5	3	+2	8
11	9	Necaxa	4	2	1	1	8	4	+4	7
12	5	Zacatepec	4	2	1	1	6	4	+2	7
13	4	Tijuana	4	1	3	0	3	2	+1	6
14	1	UdeG	4	2	0	2	5	6	−1	6
15	8	Querétaro	4	1	2	1	4	3	+1	5
16	4	Atlante	4	1	2	1	3	2	+1	5

Source: Copa MX
Rules for classification: 1) Points; 2) Goal difference; 3) Goals scored; 4) Away goals scored; 5) Drawing of lots.

=== Bracket ===
Round of 16
3	Monterrey (pen.)	2 (4)
14	UdeG	2 (3)
6	Santos Laguna	2
11	Necaxa	0
7	América	1
10	Cruz Azul	0
2	León	1 (2)
15	Querétaro (pen.)	1 (4)
5	Pachuca	5
12	Zacatepec	0
4	Morelia	2 (2)
13	Tijuana (pen.)	2 (4)
8	Guadalajara	1
9	Atlas	0
1	Toluca	1 (3)
16	Atlante (pen.)	1 (5)

Quarterfinals
3	Monterrey	4
6	Santos Laguna	1
7	América (pen.)	1 (2)
15	Querétaro	1 (0)
5	Pachuca	4
13	Tijuana	0
8	Guadalajara	1 (3)
16	Atlante (pen.)	1 (5)

Semifinals
3	Monterrey (pen.)	0 (3)
7	América	0 (0)
5	Pachuca	2
16	Atlante	0

Final
3	Monterrey	1
5	Pachuca	0

=== Round of 16 ===
24 October 2017
19:00

Toluca	1–1	Atlante
Canelo 54'	Report	Cardozo 66'
Penalties
Velarde (penalty scored); Canelo (penalty scored); Gómez (penalty scored); Delgadillo (penalty missed)	3–5	(penalty scored) F. Uscanga; (penalty scored) Tarragona; (penalty scored) Cauich; (penalty scored) Zamora; (penalty scored) Reyes

Estadio Nemesio Díez, Toluca
Attendance: 15,185
Referee: Miguel Ángel Chacón

24 October 2017
19:00

Morelia	2–2	Tijuana
Zárate 76', 84'	Report	Pérez 27'; Lucero 49' (pen.)
Penalties
J. P. Rodríguez (penalty scored); Sepúlveda (penalty scored); Guzmán (penalty missed); Vilchis (penalty missed)	2–4	(penalty scored) Pérez; (penalty scored) Malcorra; (penalty scored) Musto; (penalty scored) Mendoza

Estadio Morelos, Morelia
Attendance: 11,608
Referee: Eduardo Galván Basulto

24 October 2017
21:00

América	1–0	Cruz Azul
Pab. Aguilar 67'	Report

Estadio Azteca, Mexico City
Attendance: 52,480
Referee: Marco Antonio Ortiz

24 October 2017
21:06

León	1–1	Querétaro
Boselli 74'	Report	Benítez 54'
Penalties
Hernández (penalty scored); Cornejo (penalty missed); Ramos (penalty scored); Andrade (penalty missed)	2–4	(penalty scored) Martínez; (penalty missed) Everaldo; (penalty scored) Güémez; (penalty scored) Trejo; (penalty scored) Volpi

Estadio León, León
Attendance: 12,287
Referee: Jorge Antonio Pérez

25 October 2017
19:00

Santos Laguna	2–0	Necaxa
Rodríguez 80'; Rivas 85'	Report

Estadio Corona, Torreón
Attendance: 10,035
Referee: Fernando Hernández Gómez

25 October 2017
19:06

Pachuca	5–0	Zacatepec
Gutiérrez 17'; Honda 36', 44'; Sagal 55'; Cano 60'	Report

Estadio Hidalgo, Pachuca
Attendance: 13,892
Referee: Roberto Rios Jácome

25 October 2017
20:30

Monterrey	2–2	UdeG
A. González 10'; C. Sánchez 56'	Report	Amador 31', 60'
Penalties
Pabón (penalty scored); Benítez (penalty missed); C. Sánchez (penalty scored); Hurtado (penalty scored); Juárez (penalty missed); A. González (penalty scored)	4–3	(penalty missed) Valadéz; (penalty missed) Ruiz; (penalty scored) Amador; (penalty scored) Vázquez; (penalty scored) Hernández; (penalty missed) Padilla

Estadio BBVA Bancomer, Guadalupe
Attendance: 34,521
Referee: León Vicente Barajas

25 October 2017
21:06

Guadalajara	1–0	Atlas
Marín 24'	Report

Estadio Chivas, Zapopan
Attendance: 32,047
Referee: César Arturo Ramos
- All Round of 16 matches, which were originally scheduled to be played between 19 and 21 September, were postponed due to the 2017 Puebla earthquake.

=== Quarterfinals ===
31 October 2017
19:00

Guadalajara	1–1	Atlante
Fierro 49'	Report	Tarragona 66'
Penalties
Salcido (penalty scored); Marín (penalty scored); Zaldívar (penalty scored); Pizarro (penalty missed)	3–5	(penalty scored) F. Uscanga; (penalty scored) Ó. Uscanga; (penalty scored) Cauich; (penalty scored) Zamora; (penalty scored) Reyes

Estadio Chivas, Zapopan
Attendance: 17,016
Referee: Adonai Escobedo

1 November 2017
19:00

Monterrey	4–1	Santos Laguna
Medina 17'; C. Sánchez 41', 90+2'; Benítez 75'	Report	Rodríguez 13'

Estadio BBVA Bancomer, Guadalupe
Attendance: 38,475
Referee: Jorge Antonio Pérez

1 November 2017
21:00

América	1–1	Querétaro
Peralta 14'	Report	Güémez 67'
Penalties
Peralta (penalty scored); Domínguez (penalty scored); Romero (penalty missed); Quintero (penalty missed)	2–0	(penalty missed) M. Martínez; (penalty missed) Benítez; (penalty missed) Camilo; (penalty missed) Everaldo

Estadio Azteca, Mexico City
Attendance: 13,377
Referee: Miguel Ángel Chacón

8 November 2017
20:30

Pachuca	4–0	Tijuana
Jara 15' (pen.); Guzmán 36', 66'; Honda 42'	Report

Estadio Hidalgo, Pachuca
Attendance: 15,691
Referee: Diego Montaño Robles

=== Semifinals ===
15 November 2017
20:30

Monterrey	0–0	América
	Report
Penalties
Pabón (penalty missed); Funes Mori (penalty scored); Vagioni (penalty scored); N. Sánchez (penalty scored)	3–0	(penalty missed) Domínguez; (penalty missed) Díaz; (penalty missed) Lainez

Estadio BBVA Bancomer, Guadalupe
Attendance: 45,848
Referee: Oscar Macías Romo

21 November 2017
21:06

Pachuca	2–0	Atlante
González 5'; Guzmán 21'	Report

Estadio Hidalgo, Pachuca
Attendance: 15,325
Referee: Miguel Ángel Chacón

=== Final ===
21 December 2017
21:00

Monterrey	1–0	Pachuca
Hurtado 57'	Report

Estadio BBVA Bancomer, Guadalupe
Attendance: 35,658
Referee: Jorge Antonio Pérez

Apertura 2017 Copa MX Winners:
Monterrey
2nd Title

== Top goalscorers ==
Players sorted first by goals scored, then by last name.

Rank	Player	Club	Goals
1	(Uruguay) Carlos Sánchez	Monterrey	4
2	(Paraguay) Pablo Aguilar	América	3
2	(Mexico) Martín Barragán	Necaxa	3
2	(Paraguay) Jorge Benítez	Monterrey	3
2	(Argentina) Alexis Canelo	Toluca	3
2	(Argentina) Germán Cano	Pachuca	3
2	(Mexico) Ronaldo Cisneros	Santos Laguna	3
2	(Mexico) Víctor Guzmán	Pachuca	3
2	(Argentina) Rodrigo Holgado	Veracruz	3
2	(Japan) Keisuke Honda	Pachuca	3
2	(Mexico) Luis Márquez	Zacatepec	3
2	(Uruguay) Jonathan Rodríguez	Santos Laguna	3
2	(Argentina) Silvio Romero	América	3

Source: Copa MX
