= 2019–20 C.F. Monterrey season =

Monterrey
2019–20 season
- Chairman: Duilio Davino
- Manager: Antonio Mohamed
- Stadium: Estadio BBVA Bancomer
- Apertura: 8th Playoffs: Champions
- Clausura: 18th
- Copa MX: Winners
- Top goalscorer: League: Rogelio Funes Mori (15); All: Rogelio Funes Mori (20)
- Highest home attendance: 44,972 (vs Tigres, 28 September 2019)
- Lowest home attendance: 10,158 (vs Chiapas, 5 November 2019)
- Average home league attendance: 36,884
- Biggest win: Monterrey 6–0 Chiapas (5 November 2019)
- Biggest defeat: América 4–2 Monterrey (20 July 2019)
Home colours	Away colours	Third colours
- All statistics correct as of 4 August 2019.

The 2019–20 C.F. Monterrey season was the 84th season in the football club's history and the 69th consecutive season in the top flight of Mexican football.

== Coaching staff ==
Position	Name
Head coach	(Argentina) Antonio Mohamed
Assistant coach	(Mexico) Aldo de Nigris
Goalkeepers coach	(Argentina) Fabián Donelli
Fitness coaches	(Mexico) Javier Flores
Fitness coaches	(Uruguay) Mauricio Marchetti
Doctors	(Mexico) Francisco García
Doctors	(Mexico) Raúl Luna

== Players ==
=== Squad information ===
No.	Pos.	Nat.	Name	Date of birth (age)	Signed in	Previous club
Goalkeepers
1	GK	(Argentina)	Marcelo Barovero	18 February 1984 (aged 35)	2018	(Mexico) Necaxa
22	GK	(Mexico)	Luis Cárdenas	15 September 1993 (aged 25)	2019 (Winter)	(Mexico) Querétaro
24	GK	(Mexico)	Édson Reséndez	12 January 1996 (aged 23)	2015	(Mexico) Youth System
Defenders
3	DF	(Mexico)	César Montes	24 February 1997 (aged 22)	2015	(Mexico) Youth System
4	DF	(Argentina)	Nicolás Sánchez	4 February 1986 (aged 33)	2017 (Winter)	(Argentina) Racing
6	DF	(Mexico)	Edson Gutiérrez	19 January 1996 (aged 23)	2018	(Mexico) Celaya
11	DF	(Argentina)	Leonel Vangioni	5 May 1987 (aged 32)	2017	(Italy) Milan
15	DF	(Argentina)	José María Basanta	3 April 1984 (aged 35)	2015	(Italy) Fiorentina
19	DF	(Mexico)	Miguel Layún	25 June 1988 (aged 31)	2019 (Winter)	(Spain) Villarreal
23	DF	(Mexico)	Johan Vásquez	22 October 1998 (aged 20)	2018	(Mexico) Sonora
33	DF	(Colombia)	Stefan Medina	14 June 1992 (aged 27)	2017	(Mexico) Pachuca
Midfielders
16	MF	(Paraguay)	Celso Ortiz	26 January 1989 (aged 30)	2016	(Netherlands) AZ
17	MF	(Mexico)	Jesús Gallardo	15 August 1994 (aged 24)	2018	(Mexico) UNAM
20	MF	(Mexico)	Rodolfo Pizarro	15 February 1994 (aged 25)	2018	(Mexico) Guadalajara
21	MF	(Mexico)	Alfonso González	5 September 1994 (aged 24)	2016	(Mexico) Atlas
25	MF	(Mexico)	Jonathan González	13 April 1999 (aged 20)	2017	(Mexico) Youth System
29	MF	(Mexico)	Carlos Rodríguez	3 January 1997 (aged 22)	2017 (Winter)	(Mexico) Youth System
32	MF	(Argentina)	Maximiliano Meza	15 December 1992 (aged 26)	2019 (Winter)	(Argentina) Independiente
Forwards
7	FW	(Argentina)	Rogelio Funes Mori	5 March 1991 (aged 28)	2015	(Turkey) Eskişehirspor
8	FW	(Colombia)	Dorlan Pabón	24 January 1988 (aged 31)	2014	(Brazil) São Paulo
9	FW	(Netherlands)	Vincent Janssen	15 June 1994 (aged 25)	2019	(England) Tottenham Hotspur
10	FW	(Uruguay)	Jonathan Urretaviscaya	19 March 1990 (aged 29)	2018	(Mexico) Pachuca
14	FW	(Mexico)	Ángel Zaldívar	8 February 1994 (aged 25)	2019 (Winter)	(Mexico) Guadalajara
18	FW	(Colombia)	Avilés Hurtado	20 April 1987 (aged 32)	2017	(Mexico) Tijuana

Players and squad numbers last updated on 22 July 2019.
Note: Flags indicate national team as has been defined under FIFA eligibility rules. Players may hold more than one non-FIFA nationality.

== Transfers ==
=== In ===
N	Pos.	Nat.	Name	Age	Moving from	Type	Transfer window	Source
9	FW	(Netherlands)	Vincent Janssen	15 June 1994 (aged 25)	(England) Tottenham Hotspur	Transfer	Summer	

=== Out ===
N	Pos.	Nat.	Name	Age	Moving to	Type	Transfer window	Source
20	MF	(Mexico)	Rodolfo Pizarro	15 February 1994 (aged 26)	(United States) Inter Miami	Transfer	Winter	

== Competitions ==
=== Overview ===
Competition	First match	Last match	Starting round	Final position	Record							
Competition	First match	Last match	Starting round	Final position	Pld	W	D	L	GF	GA	GD	Win %
Torneo Apertura	20 July 2019	29 December 2019	Matchday 1	Winners	24	12	4	8	39	29	+10	50.00
Copa MX	31 July 2019	4 November 2020	Group stage	Winners	10	8	1	1	22	8	+14	80.00
Torneo Clausura	18 January 2020		Matchday 1		10	0	5	5	10	17	−7	0.00
FIFA Club World Cup	14 December 2019	21 December 2019	Second round	Third place	3	1	1	1	6	6	+0	33.33
Total					47	21	11	15	77	60	+17	44.68

Last updated: 24 April 2020
Source: Mediotiempo.com

=== Torneo Apertura ===
==== League table ====
Pos	Team	Pld	W	D	L	GF	GA	GD	Pts	Qualification or relegation
6	América	18	8	7	3	32	22	+10	31	Advance to Liguilla (Note: The first 8 places in the table qualified for the Liguilla. The last ranked team in the relegation table could qualify for the Liguilla in the Apertura tournament.)
7	Morelia	18	8	3	7	31	26	+5	27	Advance to Liguilla
8	Monterrey (C)	18	8	3	7	27	23	+4	27	Advance to Liguilla
9	Pachuca	18	7	4	7	32	26	+6	25	
10	Guadalajara	18	7	4	7	28	28	0	25	

Source: Liga MX
Rules for classification: 1) Points; 2) Goal difference; 3) Number of goals scored; 4) Head-to-head results between tied teams; 5) Number of goals scored away; 6) Highest relegation coefficient; 7) Fair Play points
(C) Champions

==== Results summary ====
Overall								Home						Away					
Pld	W	D	L	GF	GA	GD	Pts	W	D	L	GF	GA	GD	W	D	L	GF	GA	GD
22	11	4	7	36	27	+9	37	7	2	2	21	13	+8	4	2	5	15	14	+1

Last updated: 14 december 2019.
Source: LigaMX

==== Result round by round ====
Round	1	2	3	4	5	6	7	8	9	10	11	12	13	14	15	16	17	18	19
Ground	A	A	H	A	H	A	H	A	H	H	A	H	A	H	-	A	H	A	H
Result	L	L	W	W	W	L	W	L	L	W	D	L	L	D	-	W	D	W	W
Position	13	17	12	9	6	9	5	8	11	7	7	12	14	12	13†	12	11	8	8

Updated to match(es) played on 14 december 2019. Source: Mediotiempo.com
A = Away; H = Home; W = Win; D = Draw; L = Loss

==== Matches ====
20 July 2019 1	América	4–2	Monterrey	Mexico City
19:05	Castillo 16', 48'; Uribe 18'; Martínez 76'	Report	Funes Mori 7'; Hurtado 30'	Stadium: Estadio Azteca; Attendance: 31,129; Referee: César Ramos

28 July 2019 2	Atlético San Luis	1–0	Monterrey	San Luis Potosi City
17:00	Catalán 17'	Report		Stadium: Estadio Alfonso Lastras; Attendance: 25,187; Referee: José Alfredo Peñaloza

3 August 2019 3	Monterrey	3–2	León	Guadalupe
21:00	Funes Mori 45', 90'; Montes 67'	Report	Sosa 18'; Mena 42'	Stadium: Estadio BBVA; Attendance: 37,058; Referee: Diego Montaño

9 August 2019 4	Monarcas	0–1	Monterrey	Morelia
19:00		Report	Layún 90+5'	Stadium: Estadio Morelos; Attendance: 30,550; Referee: Luis Enrique Santander

17 August 2019 5	Monterrey	2–0	Toluca	Guadalupe
21:00	Layún 21'; Sánchez 54'	Report		Stadium: Estadio BBVA; Attendance: 39,783; Referee: Oscar Mejia

23 August 2019 6	Santos	2–1	Monterrey	Torreón
21:00	Furch 1'; Castillo 5'	Report	Janssen 83'	Stadium: Estadio Corona; Attendance: 24,012; Referee: Fernando Hernández

29 August 2019 7	Monterrey	2–0	UNAM	Guadalupe
21:00	Meza 25'; Funes Mori 61'	Report		Stadium: Estadio BBVA; Attendance: 35,662; Referee: Diego Montaño

1 September 2019 8	Juárez	1–0	Monterrey	Ciudad Juárez
19:00	Lezcano 41'	Report		Stadium: Estadio Olímpico Benito Juárez; Attendance: 19,678; Referee: José Alfredo Peñaloza

14 September 2019 9	Monterrey	0–2	Necaxa	Guadalupe
17:00		Report	Angulo 35', 80'	Stadium: Estadio BBVA; Attendance: 35,686; Referee: Luis Enrique Santander

21 September 2019 10	Monterrey	3–2	Puebla	Guadalupe
17:00	Sánchez 18' (pen.), 76'; Funes Mori 38'	Report	Cavallini 53'; Angulo 63'	Stadium: Estadio BBVA; Attendance: 33,060; Referee: Fernando Hernández

25 September 2019 11	Cruz Azul	1–1	Monterrey	Mexico City
21:05	Aguilar 66'	Report	Janssen 73'	Stadium: Estadio Azteca; Attendance: 12,412; Referee: Jorge Isaac Rojas

28 September 2019 12	Monterrey	0–2	Tigres	Guadalupe
19:06		Report	Zelarayán 68'; Gignac 83'	Stadium: Estadio BBVA; Attendance: 44,972; Referee: César Ramos

6 October 2019 13	Querétaro	2–1	Monterrey	Querétaro City
20:00	del Valle 20'; Sierra 29' (pen.)	Report	Rodríguez 11'	Stadium: Estadio Corregidora; Attendance: 17,517; Referee: Roberto García Orozco

20 October 2019 14	Monterrey	1–1	Guadalajara	Guadalupe
19:00	Gallardo 12'	Report	Ponce 41'	Stadium: Estadio BBVA; Attendance: 38,217; Referee: Oscar Macías

30 October 2019 16	Pachuca	2–3	Monterrey	Pachuca
19:00	López 27'; Guzmán 84'	Report	Sánchez 10', 53'; Pizarro 41'	Stadium: Estadio Hidalgo; Attendance: 17,552; Referee: Roberto García Orozco

2 November 2019 17	Monterrey	1–1	Veracruz	Guadalupe
19:06	Funes Mori 94'	Report	Kazim-Richards 65'	Stadium: Estadio BBVA; Attendance: 30,635; Referee: Luis Enrique Santander

8 November 2019 18	Tijuana	0–4	Monterrey	Tijuana
21:10		Report	Sánchez 25' (pen.); Pizarro 58'; Funes Mori 68', 69'	Stadium: Estadio Caliente; Attendance: 26,933; Referee: Jorge Isaac Rojas

23 November 2019 19	Monterrey	2–0	Atlas	Guadalupe
19:00	Funes Mori 7', 11'	Report		Stadium: Estadio BBVA; Attendance: 40,242; Referee: Diego Montaño

==== Liguilla ====
===== Quarter-finals =====
28 November 2019 First leg	Monterrey	5–2	Santos Laguna	Guadalupe
19:06	Pabón 2', 85'; Sánchez 8'; Arteaga 54' (o.g.); Janssen 70' (pen.)	Report	Furch 23'; Castillo 45'	Stadium: Estadio BBVA; Attendance: 33,635; Referee: Jorge Isaac Rojas

1 December 2019 Second leg	Santos	1–1 (3–6 agg.)	Monterrey	Torreon
19:00	Lozano 20'	Report	Janssen 57'	Stadium: Estadio Corona; Attendance: 25,642; Referee: Luis Enrique Santander

===== Semi-finals =====
4 December 2019 First leg	Monterrey	2–1	Necaxa	Guadalupe
21:00	Gallardo 10'; Janssen 73'	Report	Quiroga 64'	Stadium: Estadio BBVA; Attendance: 42,651; Referee: Fernando Hernández

7 December 2019 Second leg	Necaxa	0–1 (1–3 agg.)	Monterrey	Aguascalientes
20:30		Report	Funes Mori 90+5'	Stadium: Estadio Victoria; Attendance: 23,851; Referee: César Ramos

===== Finals =====
26 December 2019 First leg	Monterrey	2–1	América	Guadalupe
20:45	Medina 45+1'; Funes Mori 90+3'	Report	C. Rodríguez 45' (o.g.)	Stadium: Estadio BBVA; Attendance: 52,929; Referee: Luis Enrique Santander

29 December 2019 Second leg	América	2–1 (3–3 agg.) (2–4 p)	Monterrey	Mexico City
20:00	Viñas 6'; R. Sánchez 41'	Report	Funes Mori 75'	Stadium: Estadio Azteca; Attendance: 72,719; Referee: César Ramos
	Penalties
	Castillo (penalty missed); Aguilera (penalty scored); G. Rodríguez (penalty missed); Dos Santos (penalty scored)		(penalty scored) Janssen; (penalty missed) Medina; (penalty scored) Funes Mori; (penalty scored) N. Sánchez; (penalty scored) Vangioni

=== Copa MX ===
==== Group stage ====
Pos	Team	Pld	W	D	L	GF	GA	GD	Pts	Qualification
1	Chiapas	2	2	0	0	2	0	+2	6	Advance to knockout stage
2	Monterrey	1	1	0	0	2	1	+1	3	Possible knockout stage
3	UdeG	3	0	0	3	1	4	−3	0	

Updated to match(es) played on 3 September 2019. Source: Copa MX
Rules for classification: Tiebreakers

==== Matches ====
31 July 2019 1	Monterrey	2–1	UdeG	Guadalupe, Nuevo León
21:00	Sánchez 60'; Funes Mori 65'	Report	Amador 71'	Stadium: Estadio BBVA; Attendance: 22,546; Referee: Guillermo Pacheco

11 October 2019 2	Chiapas	1–2	Monterrey	Tuxtla Gutiérrez, Chiapas
20:00	Vélez 10'	Report	Vangioni 18'; Montes 86'	Stadium: Estadio Víctor Manuel Reyna; Attendance: 5,700; Referee: Adrián Vielmas

23 October 2019 3	UdeG	1–2	Monterrey	Guadalajara, Jalisco
19:00	Ceballos 79'	Report	Janssen 7', 17'	Stadium: Estadio Jalisco; Attendance: 4,875; Referee: Luis Daniel Chávez

5 November 2019 4	Monterrey	6–0	Chiapas	Guadalupe, Nuevo León
21:00	Janssen 33' (pen.), 85', 88'; Rodríguez 38'; Zaldívar 41', 63'	Report		Stadium: Estadio BBVA; Attendance: 10,158; Referee: Victor Caceres

=== FIFA Club World Cup ===
14 December 2019 Second round	Monterrey (Mexico)	3–2	(Qatar) Al-Sadd	Doha, Qatar
20:30 (UTC+3)	Vangioni 23'; Funes Mori 45+1'; Rodríguez 77'	Report	Bounedjah 66'; Hassan 89'	Stadium: Jassim bin Hamad Stadium; Attendance: 4,878; Referee: Ovidiu Hațegan (Romania)

18 December 2019 Semi-finals	Monterrey (Mexico)	1–2	(England) Liverpool	Doha, Qatar
20:30 (UTC+3)	Funes Mori 14'	Report	Keïta 12'; Firmino 90+1'	Stadium: Khalifa International Stadium; Attendance: 45,416; Referee: Roberto Tobar (Chile)

21 December 2019 Match for third place	Monterrey (Mexico)	2–2 (4–3 p)	(Saudi Arabia) Al-Hilal	Doha, Qatar
17:30 (UTC+3)	A. González 55'; Meza 60'	Report	Carlos Eduardo 35'; Gomis 66'	Stadium: Khalifa International Stadium; Attendance: 19,318; Referee: Ovidiu Hațegan (Romania)
	Penalties
	J. González (penalty scored); Medina (penalty scored); Funes Mori (penalty scored); Vásquez (penalty missed); Cárdenas (penalty scored)		(penalty scored) Gomis; (penalty scored) Giovinco; (penalty missed) Carlos Eduardo; (penalty scored) Jang Hyun-soo; (penalty missed) Kanno

== Statistics ==
=== Squad statistics ===
No.	Pos	Nat	Player	Total		Apertura		Copa MX		Clausura		Club World Cup	
No.	Pos	Nat	Player	Apps	Goals	Apps	Goals	Apps	Goals	Apps	Goals	Apps	Goals
1	GK	(Argentina)	Marcelo Barovero	36	0	24	0	0	0	10	0	2	0
3	DF	(Mexico)	César Montes	34	2	16	1	8	1	8	0	2	0
4	DF	(Argentina)	Nicolás Sánchez	42	11	24	7	7	2	9	2	2	0
5	MF	(Argentina)	Matías Kranevitter	5	0	0	0	2	0	3	0	0	0
6	DF	(Mexico)	Edson Gutiérrez	14	0	3	0	8	0	2	0	1	0
7	FW	(Argentina)	Rogelio Funes Mori	37	20	21	13	4	3	9	2	3	2
8	FW	(Colombia)	Dorlan Pabón	39	2	23	2	5	0	9	0	2	0
9	FW	(Netherlands)	Vincent Janssen	32	11	19	5	7	6	6	0	0	0
10	FW	(Uruguay)	Jonathan Urretaviscaya	7	0	3	0	3	0	0	0	1	0
10	FW	(Ivory Coast)	Aké Loba	7	1	0	0	4	0	3	1	0	0
11	DF	(Argentina)	Leonel Vangioni	22	2	15	0	1	1	4	0	2	1
14	FW	(Mexico)	Ángel Zaldívar	8	2	3	0	4	2	0	0	1	0
15	DF	(Argentina)	José María Basanta	11	0	3	0	2	0	4	0	2	0
16	MF	(Paraguay)	Celso Ortiz	35	0	23	0	2	0	9	0	1	0
17	MF	(Mexico)	Jesús Gallardo	41	6	24	2	7	1	8	3	2	0
18	FW	(Colombia)	Avilés Hurtado	11	1	10	1	1	0	0	0	0	0
19	DF	(Mexico)	Miguel Layún	36	5	20	2	3	2	10	1	3	0
20	MF	(Mexico)	Rodolfo Pizarro	24	2	18	2	0	0	3	0	3	0
21	MF	(Mexico)	Alfonso González	17	1	5	0	5	0	6	0	1	1
22	GK	(Mexico)	Luis Cárdenas	11	0	0	0	10	0	0	0	1	0
23	DF	(Mexico)	Johan Vásquez	5	0	2	0	2	0	0	0	1	0
25	MF	(Mexico)	Jonathan González	24	0	8	0	9	0	4	0	3	0
29	MF	(Mexico)	Carlos Rodríguez	40	3	23	1	6	1	9	0	2	1
32	MF	(Argentina)	Maximiliano Meza	37	4	22	1	5	2	7	0	3	1
33	DF	(Colombia)	Stefan Medina	39	1	22	1	4	0	10	0	3	0
35	DF	(Mexico)	Eric Cantú	3	0	1	0	2	0	0	0	0	0
186	DF	(Mexico)	Sergio Villarreal Lozano	1	0	0	0	1	0	0	0	0	0
187	DF	(Mexico)	Axel Grijalva	1	0	0	0	1	0	0	0	0	0
193	DF	(Mexico)	Daniel Parra	13	0	2	0	9	0	2	0	0	0
194	MF	(Mexico)	William Mejía	2	0	0	0	2	0	0	0	0	0
197	DF	(Mexico)	Jaziel Martínez	1	0	0	0	1	0	0	0	0	0
199	FW	(Mexico)	José Alvarado	9	1	0	0	5	1	4	0	0	0
202	MF	(Mexico)	Michell Rodríguez	2	0	1	0	1	0	0	0	0	0
203	FW	(Mexico)	Juan Machado	2	0	0	0	2	0	0	0	0	0
204	FW	(Mexico)	Eduardo Banda	1	0	1	0	0	0	0	0	0	0

Last updated: 26 April 2020
Source: Mediotiempo.com

=== Goals ===
As of 6 January 2019

Rank	Player	Position	Apertura	Copa MX	Clausura	FIFA Club World Club	Total
1	(Argentina) Rogelio Funes Mori	FW	13	1	0	2	16
2	(Netherlands) Vincent Janssen	FW	5	5	0	0	10
3	(Argentina) Nicolás Sánchez	DF	7	1	0	0	8
4	(Mexico) Carlos Rodríguez	MF	1	1	0	1	3
5	(Mexico) Miguel Layún	DF	2	0	0	0	2
5	(Mexico) César Montes	DF	1	1	0	0	2
5	(Mexico) Ángel Zaldívar	FW	0	2	0	0	2
5	(Mexico) Rodolfo Pizarro	MF	2	0	0	0	2
5	(Argentina) Leonel Vangioni	DF	0	1	0	1	2
5	(Argentina) Maximiliano Meza	MF	1	0	0	1	2
5	(Mexico) Jesús Gallardo	DF	2	0	0	0	2
5	(Colombia) Dorlan Pabón	DF	2	0	0	0	2
13	(Colombia) Avilés Hurtado	FW	1	0	0	0	1
13	(Colombia) Stefan Medina	DF	1	0	0	0	1
13	(Mexico) Alfonso González	MF	0	0	0	1	1

=== Hat Tricks ===
As of 7 November 2019

Player	Against	Result	Date	Competition
(Netherlands) Vincent Janssen	Chiapas	6–0 (H)	5 November 2019	Copa MX

=== Clean sheets ===
As of 8 November 2019

Rank	Name	Apertura	Copa MX	Clausura	Total
1	(Argentina) Marcelo Barovero	4	0	0	4
2	(Mexico) Luis Cárdenas	0	1	0	1

=== Disciplinary record ===
N	P	Nat.	Name	Apertura			Copa MX			Total			Notes
N	P	Nat.	Name	Yellow card	Second yellow card	Red card	Yellow card	Second yellow card	Red card	Yellow card	Second yellow card	Red card	Notes
3	DF	(Mexico)	César Montes				2			2			
4	DF	(Argentina)	Nicolás Sánchez	4			2			6			
7	FW	(Argentina)	Rogelio Funes Mori	2			1			3			
8	FW	(Colombia)	Dorlan Pabón	1						1			
9	FW	(Netherlands)	Vincent Janssen	2						2			
11	DF	(Argentina)	Leonel Vangioni	4						4			
16	MF	(Paraguay)	Celso Ortiz	5						5			
17	DF	(Mexico)	Jesús Gallardo	2						2			
19	DF	(Mexico)	Miguel Layún	4		1				4		1	
20	MF	(Mexico)	Rodolfo Pizarro	3		1				3		1	
21	FW	(Mexico)	Alfonso González	1						1			
23	DF	(Mexico)	Johan Vásquez	1			1			2			
25	MF	(Mexico)	Jonathan González	1						1			
29	MF	(Mexico)	Carlos Rodríguez	3			1			4			
32	MF	(Argentina)	Maximiliano Meza	2						2			
33	DF	(Colombia)	Stefan Medina	7	1					7	1		
194	MF	(Mexico)	Wiliam Mejía				1			1			

Last updated: 8 November 2019
Source: LigaMX
Only competitive matches
(yellow card) = Number of bookings; (second yellow card) = Number of sending offs after a second yellow card; (red card) = Number of sending offs by a direct red card.
