= Clausura 2017 Copa MX =

Clausura 2017 Copa Corona MX

Tournament details
- Country: Mexico
- Teams: 27

Final positions
- Champions: Guadalajara (4th title)
- Runners-up: Morelia

Tournament statistics
- Matches played: 69
- Goals scored: 191 (2.77 per match)
- Attendance: 919,342 (13,324 per match)
- Top goal scorer(s): Rogelio Funes Mori (7 goals)

The Clausura 2017 Copa MX (officially the Clausura 2017 Copa Corona MX for sponsorship reasons) was the 77th staging of the Copa MX, the 50th staging in the professional era and is the tenth tournament played since the 1996–97 edition.

This tournament began on 17 January 2017 and ended on 19 April 2017.

The final was held at Estadio Chivas in the Guadalajara suburb of Zapopan with the home team Guadalajara defeating Morelia 3–1 on penalty kicks to win their fourth title.

As winners, Guadalajara earned a spot to face Querétaro (winners of the Apertura 2016 edition), in the 2017 Supercopa MX.

== Participants ==
This tournament featured clubs from Liga MX who did not participate in the 2016–17 CONCACAF Champions League knockout stages (Monterrey). Due to the Mexican clubs withdrawing from the Copa Libertadores, teams who qualified to the 2017 edition (Tijuana, América and Guadalajara) also participated in the tournament, which made nine groups instead of eight like in the previous edition.

The tournament also featured the top 12 Ascenso MX teams of the Apertura 2016 classification table.

== Draw ==
Location of the participating teams.
Red: Liga MX clubs; Blue: Ascenso MX clubs

The draw for the tournament took place on December 14, 2016, at the Mexican Football Federation headquarters in Toluca, Mexico. 27 teams were drawn into nine groups of three, with each group containing one team from each of the three pots.

Clubs in Pot 1 were drawn to be the seed of each group according to the order of their drawing. That is, the first club that was drawn is seed of Group 1, the second drawn is seed of Group 2 and so on and so on. The Liga MX teams in Pot 1 are the title holders (Querétaro), the three who qualified to the 2017 Copa Libertadores (Tijuana, Guadalajara, América) and the club not participating in the 2016–17 CONCACAF Champions League knockout stages (Monterrey). The Ascenso MX teams in Pot 1 are the four best teams in the Apertura 2016 classification table.

Pot 2 contained Liga MX clubs who ended 7–10 in the Apertura 2016 classification table and Ascenso MX clubs who ended 5–9 in the Apertura 2016 classification table.

Pot 3 contained Liga MX clubs who ended 11–16 in the Apertura 2016 classification table and Ascenso MX clubs who ended 10–12 Apertura 2016 classification table.

=== Teams ===
Pot 1
América (LMX)	Celaya (AMX)	Guadalajara (LMX)
Monterrey (LMX)	Querétaro (LMX)	Tijuana (LMX)
UAEM (AMX)	Zacatecas (AMX)	Zacatepec (AMX)
Pot 2
Atlante (AMX)	Coras (AMX)	León (LMX)
Necaxa (LMX)	Oaxaca (AMX)	Puebla (LMX)
Sinaloa (AMX)	Sonora (AMX)	Toluca (LMX)
Pot 3
Atlas (LMX)	Chiapas (LMX)	Cruz Azul (LMX)
Juárez (AMX)	Morelia (LMX)	Santos Laguna (LMX)
UAT (AMX)	Venados (AMX)	Veracruz (LMX)

== Tiebreakers ==
If two or more clubs are equal on points on completion of the group matches, the following criteria are applied to determine the rankings:

1. superior goal difference;
2. higher number of goals scored;
3. scores of the group matches played among the clubs in question;
4. higher number of goals scored away in the group matches played among the clubs in question;
5. best position in the Relegation table;
6. fair play ranking;
7. drawing of lots.

== Group stage ==
Every group is composed of three clubs, each group has at least one club from Liga MX and Ascenso MX

All times are UTC−06:00 except for matches in Cancún (UTC−05:00), Ciudad Juárez, Culiacán, Hermosillo, Tepic (all UTC−07:00) and Tijuana (UTC−08:00)

=== Group 1 ===
Pos	Team	Pld	W	D	L	GF	GA	GD	Pts	Qualification
1	Tijuana	4	3	0	1	5	3	+2	9	Advance to knockout stage
2	UAT	4	2	0	2	5	5	0	6	Advance to knockout stage
3	Sonora	4	1	0	3	4	6	−2	3	

Rules for classification: Tiebreakers
17 January 2017
20:00

Sonora	1–0	Tijuana
Loroña 50'	Report

Estadio Héroe de Nacozari, Hermosillo
Attendance: 10,350
Referee: Christian Adrián Ramírez Tejeda

24 January 2017
21:00

UAT	3–2	Sonora
Atilano 29'; Guzmán 51'; Olguín 79'	Report	Ivanobski 60'; Arce 66'

Estadio Marte R. Gómez, Ciudad Victoria
Attendance: 6,130
Referee: Quetzalli Alvarado Godínez

31 January 2017
19:00

Tijuana	2–1	UAT
Martín 15'; Y. Corona 49'	Report	Saucedo 58'

Estadio Caliente, Tijuana
Attendance: 20,333
Referee: Miguel Ángel Flores

14 February 2017
20:00

Sonora	0–1	UAT
	Report	Olguín 59'

Estadio Héroe de Nacozari, Hermosillo
Attendance: 3,600
Referee: Lucila Venegas

21 February 2017
21:00

UAT	0–1	Tijuana
	Report	Martín 83'

Estadio Marte R. Gómez, Ciudad Victoria
Attendance: 6,981
Referee: Juan Esquivel

28 February 2017
19:00

Tijuana	2–1	Sonora
Hurtado 82' (pen.); Malcorra 90'	Report	Loroña 66'

Estadio Caliente, Tijuana
Attendance: 20,333
Referee: Diego Montaño Robles

=== Group 2 ===
Pos	Team	Pld	W	D	L	GF	GA	GD	Pts	Qualification
1	Querétaro	4	3	0	1	7	5	+2	9	Advance to knockout stage
2	Cruz Azul	4	1	2	1	6	4	+2	5	Advance to knockout stage
3	Oaxaca	4	0	2	2	1	5	−4	2	

Rules for classification: Tiebreakers
18 January 2017
19:00

Querétaro	3–2	Cruz Azul
Sepúlveda 11'; Noriega 23'; Villa 74'	Report	Cauteruccio 3'; Peñalba 71' (pen.)

Estadio Corregidora, Querétaro
Attendance: 23,769
Referee: Jonathan Hernández

24 January 2017
20:30

Cruz Azul	1–1	Oaxaca
M. Rodríguez 40'	Report	González 90+1'

Estadio Azul, Mexico City
Attendance: 5,446
Referee: Diego Montaño Robles

31 January 2017
21:00

Oaxaca	0–1	Querétaro
	Report	Benítez 89'

Estadio Tecnológico de Oaxaca, Oaxaca
Attendance: 7,380
Referee: Arturo Cruz

15 February 2017
20:30

Oaxaca	0–0	Cruz Azul
	Report

Estadio Tecnológico de Oaxaca, Oaxaca
Attendance: 15,680
Referee: Aldo Cano

22 February 2017
20:30

Cruz Azul	3–0	Querétaro
Mena 12'; Benítez 36', 70'	Report

Estadio Azul, Mexico City
Attendance: 5,532
Referee: Jorge Isaac Rojas

28 February 2017
19:00

Querétaro	3–0	Oaxaca
Camilo 7'; Gutiérrez 82'; Villa 87'	Report

Estadio Corregidora, Querétaro
Attendance: 10,750
Referee: Miguel Ángel Flores

=== Group 3 ===
Pos	Team	Pld	W	D	L	GF	GA	GD	Pts	Qualification
1	Santos Laguna	4	2	0	2	10	6	+4	6	Advance to knockout stage
2	América	4	2	0	2	7	7	0	6	Advance to knockout stage
3	Coras	4	2	0	2	5	9	−4	6	

Rules for classification: Tiebreakers
18 January 2017
20:30

América	3–2	Santos Laguna
Mares 39'; Quintero 44'; Romero 56'	Report	Dávila 26'; Martínez 66'

Estadio Azteca, Mexico City
Attendance: 18,364
Referee: Eduardo Galvan Basulto

24 January 2017
19:00

Santos Laguna	1–2	Coras
Araujo 81'	Report	Ríos 38'; Gómez 88'

Estadio Corona, Torreón
Attendance: 13,682
Referee: Alejandro Funk Villafañe

1 February 2017
19:30

Coras	3–2	América
Neira 31'; Ríos 41'; Nápoles 71'	Report	Romero 50', 76'

Arena Cora, Tepic
Attendance: 12,192
Referee: Jonathan Hernández

14 February 2017
21:00

América	1–0	Coras
Arroyo 8'	Report

Estadio Azteca, Mexico City
Attendance: 10,364
Referee: León Vicente Barajas

21 February 2017
19:30

Coras	0–5	Santos Laguna
	Report	Dávila 44'; Rodríguez 51'; Djaniny 67'; De Buen 77'; Martínez 82'

Arena Cora, Tepic
Attendance: Mario Vargas
Referee: 8,062

1 March 2017
20:30

Santos Laguna	2–1	América
Furch 55', 90+3'	Report	Paredes 90'

Estadio Corona, Torreón
Attendance: 15,771
Referee: Adonai Escobedo González

=== Group 4 ===
Pos	Team	Pld	W	D	L	GF	GA	GD	Pts	Qualification
1	Puebla	4	2	1	1	4	3	+1	7	Advance to Knockout stage
2	Zacatecas	4	1	2	1	5	3	+2	5	Advance to Knockout stage
3	Atlas	4	1	1	2	3	6	−3	4	

Rules for classification: Tiebreakers
17 January 2017
19:00

Zacatecas	1–1	Puebla
Echeverría 89'	Report	Amione 42'

Estadio Francisco Villa, Zacatecas
Attendance: 4,335
Referee: José Luis Báez Félix

25 January 2017
21:00

Puebla	1–0	Atlas
F. González 40'	Report

Estadio Cuauhtémoc, Puebla
Attendance: 8,450
Referee: Roberto Ríos

31 January 2017
19:00

Atlas	1–1	Zacatecas
Tabó 33'	Report	Calderón 6' (o.g.)

Estadio Jalisco, Guadalajara
Attendance: 9,190
Referee: León Vicente Barajas Anzures

14 February 2017
19:00

Puebla	1–0	Zacatecas
Amione 17'	Report

Estadio Cuauhtémoc, Puebla
Attendance: 4,698
Referee: Diego Montaño

22 February 2017
19:00

Atlas	2–1	Puebla
Barraza 19'; Salinas 52'	Report	F. González 86'

Estadio Jalisco, Guadalajara
Attendance: 6,713
Referee: Miguel Ángel Flores

1 March 2017
21:00

Zacatecas	3–0	Atlas
López 53'; Cardozo 61'; Maya 79'	Report

Estadio Francisco Villa, Zacatecas
Attendance: 7,558
Referee: Aldo Cano

=== Group 5 ===
Pos	Team	Pld	W	D	L	GF	GA	GD	Pts	Qualification
1	Necaxa	4	2	1	1	9	5	+4	7	Advance to knockout stage
2	Chiapas	4	2	1	1	6	5	+1	7	Advance to knockout stage
3	UAEM	4	1	0	3	5	10	−5	3	

Rules for classification: Tiebreakers
17 January 2017
21:00

UAEM	1–0	Chiapas
González 24'	Report

Estadio Alberto "Chivo" Córdoba, Toluca
Attendance: 4,080
Referee: Mario Vargas

25 January 2017
19:00

Chiapas	1–1	Necaxa
Bermúdez 85'	Report	Riaño 33'

Estadio Víctor Manuel Reyna, Tuxtla Gutiérrez
Attendance: 4,523
Referee: Uriel Olvera

1 February 2017
21:00

Necaxa	5–1	UAEM
Riolfo 14', 23', 89'; Puch 17' (pen.); Díaz 28' (pen.)	Report	Cerda 80'

Estadio Victoria, Aguascalientes
Attendance: 6,274
Referee: Marco Antonio Ortiz Nava

15 February 2017
19:00

Necaxa	1–2	Chiapas
Espíndola 10'	Report	Miño 68'; Esqueda 87'

Estadio Victoria, Aguascalientes
Attendance: 7,374
Referee: Alejandro Funk Villafañe

21 February 2017
19:00

UAEM	1–2	Necaxa
Medina 54'	Report	Barreiro 20'; Maturana 24'

Estadio Alberto "Chivo" Córdoba, Toluca
Attendance: 8,973
Referee: Jesús Bisguerra

28 February 2017
19:00

Chiapas	3–2	UAEM
Micolta 59', 64', 81'	Report	Pizarro 4'; Hipólito 11'

Estadio Víctor Manuel Reyna, Tuxtla Gutiérrez
Attendance: 2,662
Referee: Jonathan Hernández

=== Group 6 ===
Pos	Team	Pld	W	D	L	GF	GA	GD	Pts	Qualification
1	Guadalajara	4	3	1	0	6	2	+4	10	Advance to knockout stage
2	Atlante	4	1	2	1	5	5	0	5	
3	Venados	4	0	1	3	1	5	−4	1	

Rules for classification: Tiebreakers
18 January 2017
20:00

Atlante	2–0	Venados
Zalazar 22' (pen.); Medina 68'	Report

Estadio Andrés Quintana Roo, Cancún
Attendance: 1,687
Referee: Baruch Absalón Castellanos

24 January 2017
21:00

Guadalajara	1–1	Atlante
Ponce 90+3'	Report	Herrera 90'

Estadio Chivas, Zapopan
Attendance: 13,050
Referee: Jorge Antonio Pérez

1 February 2017
19:00

Venados	0–1	Guadalajara
	Report	Fierro 45+1'

Estadio Carlos Iturralde, Mérida
Attendance: 11,198
Referee: Oscar Mejía

15 February 2017
21:00

Guadalajara	1–0	Venados
Calderón 62' (pen.)	Report

Estadio Chivas, Zapopan
Attendance: 9,542
Referee: Uriel Olvera

21 February 2017
20:00

Atlante	1–3	Guadalajara
Espinosa 25'	Report	Fierro 61'; López 85'; Benítez 90+2'

Estadio Andrés Quintana Roo, Cancún
Attendance: 16,263
Referee: Arturo Cruz Hurtado

28 February 2017
19:00

Venados	1–1	Atlante
Navarro 73' (pen.)	Report	Uscanga 77'

Estadio Carlos Iturralde, Mérida
Attendance: 2,987
Referee: Adalid Maganda Villalva

=== Group 7 ===
Pos	Team	Pld	W	D	L	GF	GA	GD	Pts	Qualification
1	Monterrey	4	4	0	0	13	1	+12	12	Advance to knockout stage
2	Juárez	4	2	0	2	5	5	0	6	Advance to knockout stage
3	Sinaloa	4	0	0	4	2	14	−12	0	

Rules for classification: Tiebreakers
18 January 2017
20:00

Sinaloa	1–2	Juárez
García 61'	Report	Enríquez 30'; Sidnei 63'

Estadio Banorte, Culiacán
Attendance: 5,333
Referee: Saúl Fernando Orozco

25 January 2017
19:30

Juárez	0–1	Monterrey
	Report	Chará 52'

Estadio Olímpico Benito Juárez, Ciudad Juárez
Attendance: 9,367
Referee: Allan Morales

1 February 2017
19:00

Monterrey	5–0	Sinaloa
Juárez 22'; Cardona 29'; Funes Mori 44', 72'; López 82'	Report

Estadio BBVA Bancomer, Guadalupe
Attendance: 30,600
Referee: Adonaí Escobedo González

15 February 2017
20:00

Juárez	2–1	Sinaloa
Lucas 19'; Chávez 22'	Report	Lara 52'

Estadio Olímpico Benito Juárez, Ciudad Juárez
Attendance: 3,614
Referee: Quetzalli Alvarado

21 February 2017
20:00

Sinaloa	0–5	Monterrey
	Report	N. Sánchez 25'; Chará 62'; A. González 76'; Cardona 85'; Funes Mori 90'

Estadio Banorte, Culiacán
Attendance: 8,333
Referee: Brian Omar González

28 February 2017
21:00

Monterrey	2–1	Juárez
A. González 15'; Portales 65'	Report	Gómez 61'

Estadio BBVA Bancomer, Guadalupe
Attendance: 35,249
Referee: Roberto Ríos Jácome

=== Group 8 ===
Pos	Team	Pld	W	D	L	GF	GA	GD	Pts	Qualification
1	Toluca	4	3	1	0	7	2	+5	10	Advance to knockout stage
2	Veracruz	4	0	3	1	3	4	−1	3	
3	Celaya	4	0	2	2	3	7	−4	2	

Rules for classification: Tiebreakers
17 January 2017
19:00

Celaya	0–2	Toluca
	Report	Galindo 61'; Maikon Leite 74'

Estadio Miguel Alemán Valdés, Celaya
Attendance: 5,507
Referee: León Vicente Barajas

24 January 2017
19:00

Veracruz	1–1	Celaya
Noya 47'	Report	Vázquez 36' (pen.)

Estadio Luis "Pirata" Fuente, Veracruz
Attendance: 4,676
Referee: Adonaí Escobedo González

31 January 2017
19:00

Veracruz	0–1	Toluca
	Report	Triverio 76'

Estadio Luis "Pirata" Fuente, Veracruz
Attendance: 6,495
Referee: Fernando Hernández

14 February 2017
19:00

Toluca	1–1	Veracruz
A. García 89'	Report	Flores 27'

Estadio Nemesio Díez, Toluca
Attendance: 12,100
Referee: Roberto Ríos Jácome

21 February 2017
19:00

Celaya	1–1	Veracruz
Moreno 50'	Report	Chávez 53'

Estadio Miguel Alemán Valdés, Celaya
Attendance: 2,989
Referee: Saúl Silva

1 March 2017
19:00

Toluca	3–1	Celaya
Sambueza 63'; Triverio 73' (pen.); Uribe 88'	Report	López 14' (pen.)

Estadio Nemesio Díez, Toluca
Attendance: 11,200
Referee: Uriel Olvera

=== Group 9 ===
Pos	Team	Pld	W	D	L	GF	GA	GD	Pts	Qualification
1	León	4	4	0	0	13	3	+10	12	Advance to knockout stage
2	Morelia	4	2	0	2	6	7	−1	6	Advance to knockout stage
3	Zacatepec	4	0	0	4	2	11	−9	0	

Rules for classification: Tiebreakers
18 January 2017
19:00

León	3–0	Morelia
Guzmán 35'; Navarro 76'; Peña 82'	Report

Estadio León, León
Attendance: 17,095
Referee: Fernando Hernández Gómez

25 January 2017
19:00

Zacatepec	1–3	León
Bonfigli 46'	Report	Burbano 13'; Guzmán 66'; Novaretti 87'

Estadio Agustín "Coruco" Díaz, Zacatepec
Attendance: 14,415
Referee: Oscar Mejía

31 January 2017
21:00

Morelia	1–0	Zacatepec
Polo 8'	Report

Estadio Morelos, Morelia
Attendance: 9,226
Referee: Eduardo Galván

14 February 2017
21:00

León	4–0	Zacatepec
Boselli 5', 53'; Montes 62'; Novaretti 82'	Report

Estadio León, León
Attendance: 13,031
Referee: Adalid Maganda Villalva

22 February 2017
19:00

Zacatepec	1–3	Morelia
Vidal 90'	Report	Penilla 6'; Zárate 22'; Lezcano 28'

Estadio Agustín "Coruco" Díaz, Zacatepec
Attendance: 7,523
Referee: Juan Ramírez Tostado

28 February 2017
19:00

Morelia	2–3	León
Penilla 61'; Cabrera 66'	Report	Hernández 17'; Andrade 24'; Suárez 85'

Estadio Morelos, Morelia
Attendance: 8,596
Referee: Jorge Antonio Pérez

=== Ranking of second-placed teams ===
Pos	Grp	Team	Pld	W	D	L	GF	GA	GD	Pts	Qualification
1	5	Chiapas	4	2	1	1	6	5	+1	7	Advance to knockout stage
2	3	América	4	2	0	2	7	7	0	6	Advance to knockout stage
3	7	Juárez	4	2	0	2	5	5	0	6 (Note: Juárez ahead of UAT on away goals scored (Juárez 3, UAT 2))	Advance to knockout stage
4	1	UAT	4	2	0	2	5	5	0	6	Advance to knockout stage
5	9	Morelia	4	2	0	2	6	7	−1	6	Advance to knockout stage
6	2	Cruz Azul	4	1	2	1	6	4	+2	5	Advance to knockout stage
7	4	Zacatecas	4	1	2	1	5	3	+2	5	Advance to knockout stage
8	6	Atlante	4	1	2	1	5	5	0	5	
9	8	Veracruz	4	0	3	1	3	4	−1	3	

Source: Liga MX
Rules for classification: Tiebreakers

== Knockout stage ==
- The clubs that advance to this stage will be ranked and seeded 1 to 16 based on performance in the group stage. In case of ties, the same tiebreakers used to rank the runners-up will be used.
- All rounds are played in a single game. If a game ends in a draw, it will proceed directly to a penalty shoot-out. The highest seeded club will host each match, regardless of which division each club belongs.
- The winners of the groups and the seven best second place teams of each group will advance to the Knockout stage.

=== Qualified teams ===
The nine group winners and the seven best runners-up from the group stage qualify for the final stage.

Group	Winners	Runners-up
1	Tijuana	UAT
2	Querétaro	Cruz Azul
3	Santos Laguna	América
4	Puebla	Zacatecas
5	Necaxa	Chiapas
6	Guadalajara	—
7	Monterrey	Juárez
8	Toluca	—
9	León	Morelia

=== Seeding ===
Seed	Grp	Team	Pld	W	D	L	GF	GA	GD	Pts
1	7	Monterrey	4	4	0	0	13	1	+12	12
2	9	León	4	4	0	0	13	3	+10	12
3	8	Toluca	4	3	1	0	7	2	+5	10
4	6	Guadalajara	4	3	1	0	6	2	+4	10
5	2	Querétaro	4	3	0	1	7	5	+2	9
6	1	Tijuana	4	3	0	1	5	3	+2	9
7	5	Necaxa	4	2	1	1	9	5	+4	7
8	5	Chiapas	4	2	1	1	6	5	+1	7
9	4	Puebla	4	2	1	1	4	3	+1	7
10	3	Santos Laguna	4	2	0	2	10	6	+4	6
11	3	América	4	2	0	2	7	7	0	6
12	7	Juárez	4	2	0	2	5	5	0	6 (Note: Juárez ahead of UAT on away goals scored (Juárez 3, UAT 2))
13	1	UAT	4	2	0	2	5	5	0	6
14	9	Morelia	4	2	0	2	6	7	−1	6
15	2	Cruz Azul	4	1	2	1	6	4	+2	5
16	4	Zacatecas	4	1	2	1	5	3	+2	5

Source: Liga MX
Rules for classification: Tiebreakers

=== Bracket ===
Round of 16
1	Monterrey	4
16	Zacatecas	0
8	Chiapas	2
9	Puebla	3
4	Guadalajara (pen.)	2 (6)
13	UAT	2 (5)
5	Querétaro	1 (1)
12	Juárez (pen.)	1 (4)
6	Tijuana	1
11	América	0
3	Toluca	2 (0)
14	Morelia (pen.)	2 (3)
7	Necaxa	1
10	Santos Laguna	3
2	León	0
15	Cruz Azul	1

Quarterfinals
1	Monterrey	3
9	Puebla	2
4	Guadalajara	3
12	Juárez	2
6	Tijuana	0
14	Morelia	2
10	Santos Laguna	1
15	Cruz Azul	3

Semifinals
1	Monterrey	1
4	Guadalajara	2
14	Morelia	1
15	Cruz Azul	0

Final
4	Guadalajara (pen.)	0 (3)
14	Morelia	0 (1)

=== Round of 16 ===
All times are UTC−06:00 except for matches in Tijuana (UTC−08:00)

7 March 2017
19:00

Querétaro	1–1	Juárez
Camilo 35'	Report	Ortiz 90+4'
Penalties
Camilo (penalty scored); Gutiérrez (penalty missed); Benítez (penalty missed)	1–4	(penalty scored) Enríquez; (penalty scored) Gómez; (penalty scored) Borelli; (penalty scored) Lucas

Estadio Corregidora, Querétaro
Attendance: 14,475
Referee: Adonaí Escobedo

7 March 2017
19:00

Chiapas	2–3	Puebla
Miño 64'; Micolta 86' (pen.)	Report	Navarro 38', 65'; Orrantía 41'

Estadio Víctor Manuel Reyna, Tuxtla Gutiérrez
Attendance: 3,125
Referee: León Vicente Barajas

7 March 2017
21:00

Monterrey	4–0	Zacatecas
N. Sánchez 11'; Chará 74'; Funes Mori 78', 90+1'	Report

Estadio BBVA Bancomer, Guadalupe
Attendance: 36,638
Referee: Jonathan Hernández

7 March 2017
21:00

Guadalajara	2–2	UAT
Valdéz 45' (o.g.); López 63'	Report	Saucedo 67'; Guzmán 90+3'
Penalties
Alanís (penalty scored); Fierro (penalty missed); Zaldívar (penalty scored); Pérez (penalty scored); Calderón (penalty scored); López (penalty scored); Pulido (penalty scored)	6–5	(penalty scored) Atilano; (penalty missed) Chávez; (penalty scored) Acosta; (penalty scored) Rosas; (penalty scored) Guzmán; (penalty scored) Saucedo; (penalty missed) Rincón

Estadio Chivas, Zapopan
Attendance: 14,457
Referee: Roberto Ríos

8 March 2017
19:00

Toluca	2–2	Morelia
Triverio 18' (pen.); Esquivel 31'	Report	Osuna 41'; Penilla 66'
Penalties
Barrientos (penalty missed); Velarde (penalty missed); Gómez (penalty missed)	0–3	(penalty scored) Osuna; (penalty scored) Zárate; (penalty scored) Cabrera

Estadio Nemesio Díez, Toluca
Attendance: 15,220
Referee: Miguel Ángel Flores

8 March 2017
19:00

León	0–1	Cruz Azul
	Report	Mena 14'

Estadio León, León
Attendance: 21,822
Referee: Diego Montaño

8 March 2017
19:00

Tijuana	1–0	América
Arriola 29'	Report

Estadio Caliente, Tijuana
Attendance: 27,333
Referee: Fernando Hernández

8 March 2017
21:00

Necaxa	1–3	Santos Laguna
Barreiro 29' (pen.)	Report	De Buen 27'; Rodríguez 73'; Furch 82'

Estadio Victoria, Aguascalientes
Attendance: 13,924
Referee: Eduardo Galvan

=== Quarterfinals ===
14 March 2017
19:00

Santos Laguna	1–3	Cruz Azul
Djaniny 12'	Report	Cauteruccio 22', 24', 35'

Estadio Corona, Torreón
Attendance: 20,701
Referee: Adonai Escobedo

14 March 2017
20:00

Tijuana	0–2	Morelia
	Report	Sansores 69'; Penilla 73'

Estadio Caliente, Tijuana
Attendance: 19,333
Referee: Eduardo Galván Basulto

15 March 2017
20:30

Monterrey	3–2	Puebla
Funes Mori 6'; Cardona 17' (pen.); Chará 61'	Report	F. González 5'; Schmidt 69'

Estadio BBVA Bancomer, Guadalupe
Attendance: 41,857
Referee: José Alfredo Peñaloza

15 March 2017
21:00

Guadalajara	3–2	Juárez
Pizarro 57'; Zaldívar 70' (pen.); López 90+1'	Report	Lucas 31', 61'

Estadio Chivas, Zapopan
Attendance: 21,875
Referee: Jorge Antonio Pérez

=== Semifinals ===
4 April 2017
19:00

Morelia	1–0	Cruz Azul
Vilchis 86'	Report

Estadio Morelos, Morelia
Attendance: 25,892
Referee: Diego Montaño

5 April 2017
20:30

Monterrey	1–2	Guadalajara
Funes Mori 22'	Report	Pulido 61'; Zaldívar 82' (pen.)

Estadio BBVA Bancomer, Guadalupe
Attendance: 50,736
Referee: Roberto Rios Jácome

=== Final ===
19 April 2017
21:06

Guadalajara	0–0	Morelia
	Report
Penalties
Salcido (penalty missed); Marín (penalty scored); Pulido (penalty scored); Pineda (penalty scored)	3–1	(penalty scored) Osuna; (penalty missed) Zárate; (penalty missed) Cabrera; (penalty missed) Rey

Estadio Chivas, Zapopan
Attendance: 42,329
Referee: Fernando Hernández

== Top goalscorers ==
Players sorted first by goals scored, then by last name

Rank	Player	Club	Goals
1	(Argentina) Rogelio Funes Mori	Monterrey	7
2	(Uruguay) Martín Cauteruccio	Cruz Azul	4
2	(Colombia) Yimmi Chará	Monterrey	4
2	(Colombia) Félix Micolta	Chiapas	4
2	(Ecuador) Cristian Penilla	Morelia	4
6	(Colombia) Edwin Cardona	Monterrey	3
6	(Argentina) Julio Furch	Santos Laguna	3
6	(Argentina) Federico González	Puebla	3
6	(Mexico) Eduardo López	Guadalajara	3
6	(Uruguay) Diego Riolfo	Necaxa	3
6	(Argentina) Silvio Romero	América	3
6	(Argentina) Enrique Triverio	Toluca	3
6	(Brazil) Lucas	Juárez	3

Source: Copa MX
