= Apertura 2017 Copa MX final =

- Event: Apertura 2017 Copa MX
Monterrey	Pachuca
1	0
- Date: 21 December 2017
- Venue: Estadio BBVA Bancomer, Guadalupe, Nuevo León
- Referee: Jorge Antonio Pérez
- Attendance: 35,658

The Apertura 2017 Copa MX final was the final of the Apertura 2017 Copa MX, the eleventh edition of the Copa MX under its current format and 78th overall organized by the Mexican Football Federation, the governing body of association football in Mexico.

The final was contested in a single leg format between Liga MX clubs Monterrey and Pachuca. The match was hosted by Monterrey at Estadio BBVA Bancomer in the Monterrey suburb of Guadalupe on 21 December 2017. The winners will earn a spot to face the winners of the Clausura 2018 in the 2018 Supercopa MX.

== Qualified teams ==
Team	Previous finals appearances (bold indicates winners)
Monterrey	3 (1964, 1969, **1992**)
Pachuca	None (Note: Does not include finals from Amateur era.)

== Venue ==
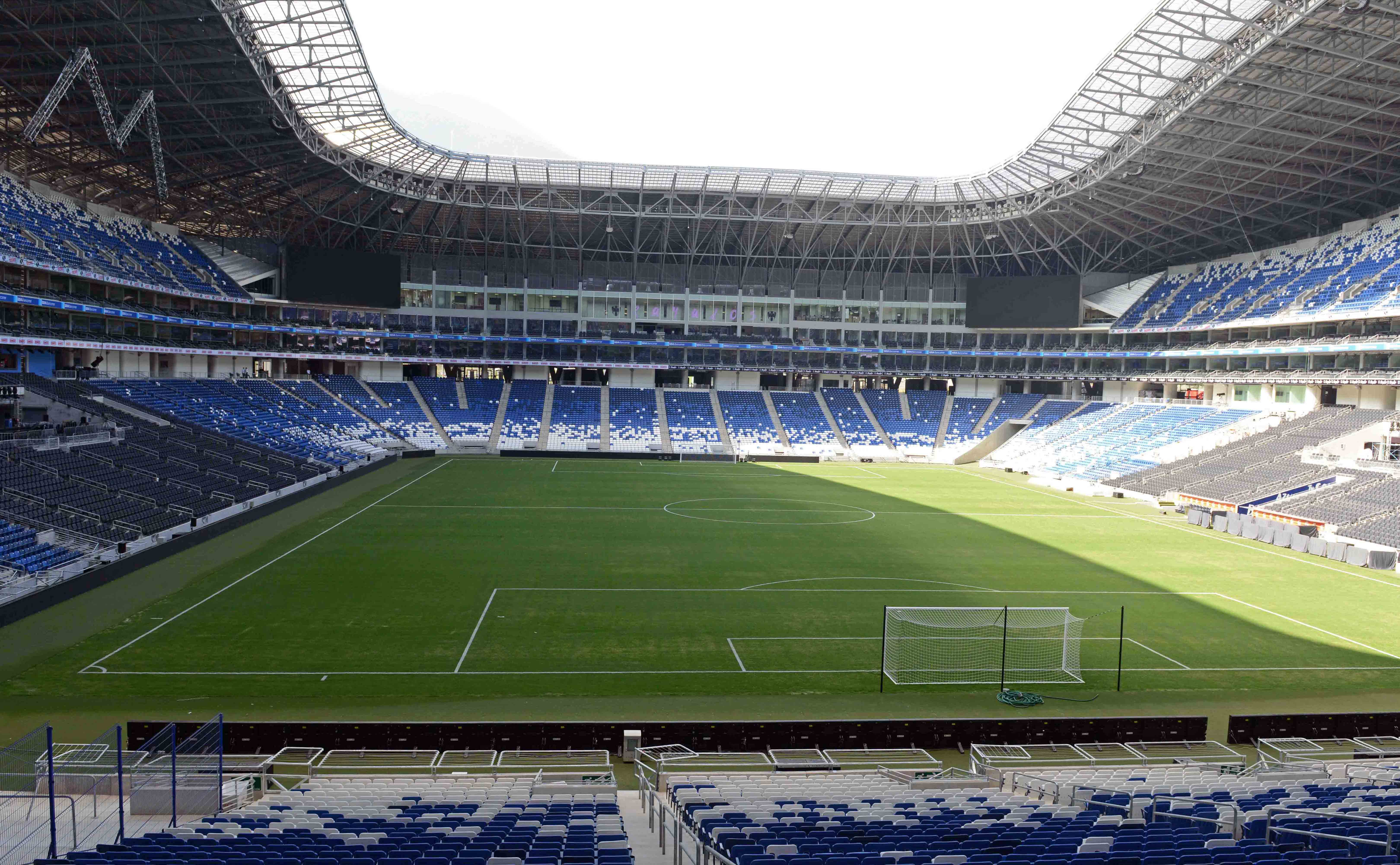
Estadio BBVA Bancomer hosted the final

Due to the tournament's regulations, the higher seed among both finalists during the group stage will host the final, thus Estadio BBVA Bancomer will host the final. The venue which opened on 2 August 2015 is the newest venue in Liga MX and has been home to Monterrey since the Apertura 2015 season. The venue has previously hosted two Liga MX finals, the Clausura 2016 and the Apertura 2017.

== Background ==
Monterrey has won the tournament once, while Pachuca has won it twice in the Amateur era (1907–1943) but never in the Professional era. Pachuca won the inaugural tournament in 1908 defeating Reforma 4–0 in the final. Before reaching this final, the last time Monterrey reached a final of any kind was eleven days earlier where they lost to their arch-rivals UANL in the Apertura 2017 final. Pachuca last reached a final of any kind eight months earlier when they also defeated UANL 2–1 on aggregate to capture the 2016–17 CONCACAF Champions League.

These two clubs last faced each other in a final the previous year when Pachuca won 2–1 on aggregate after a late equalizer in the 93rd minute in the Clausura 2016 Liga MX Final.

Monterrey won three, drew one and scored eight goals during group stage, as they were seeded third. They eliminated UdeG on penalty kicks in the Round of 16, Santos Laguna in the quarterfinals and América on penalty kicks in the semifinals.

Pachuca won three, drew one and scored four goals, as they were seeded fifth. They eliminated Zacatepec in the Round of 16, Tijuana in the quarterfinals and Atlante in the semifinals.

== Road to the finals ==
Note: In all results below, the score of the finalist is given first.

Monterrey		Round	Pachuca	
Opponent	Result	Group stage	Opponent	Result
Celaya	3–0 (H)	Matchday 1	Sonora	1–0 (A)
UNAM	1–1 (A)	Matchday 2	Querétaro	0–0 (H)
Celaya	1–0 (A)	Matchday 3	Querétaro	1–0 (A)
UNAM	3–1 (H)	Matchday 4	Sonora	2–1 (H)
**Group 2 winners**: Pos / Team / Pld / Pts; **1** / Monterrey / **4** / **10**; 2 / UNAM / 4 / **5**; 3 / Celaya / 4 / **1**; Source: Copa MX		Final standings	**Group 8 winners**: Pos / Team / Pld / Pts; **1** / Pachuca / **4** / **10**; 2 / Querétaro / 4 / **5**; 3 / Sonora / 4 / **1**; Source: Copa MX	
Opponent	Result	Knockout stage	Opponent	Result
UdeG	2–2 (4–3 pen.) (H)	Round of 16	Zacatepec	5–0 (H)
Santos Laguna	4–1 (H)	Quarterfinals	Tijuana	4–0 (H)
América	0–0 (3–0 pen.) (H)	Semifinals	Atlante	2–0 (H)

== Match ==
21 December 2017
21:00

Monterrey	1–0	Pachuca
Hurtado 57'	Report

Estadio BBVA Bancomer, Guadalupe
Attendance: 35,658
Referee: Jorge Antonio Pérez

**Monterrey**	**Pachuca**

GK	22	(Argentina) Juan Pablo Carrizo
DF	11	(Argentina) Leonel Vangioni
DF	15	(Argentina) José María Basanta (c)	(yellow card) 44'
DF	3	(Mexico) César Montes
DF	33	(Colombia) Stefan Medina
MF	25	(United States) Jonathan González
MF	16	(Paraguay) Celso Ortiz		(substituted off) 87'
MF	13	(Uruguay) Carlos Sánchez
FW	18	(Colombia) Avilés Hurtado
FW	8	(Colombia) Dorlan Pabón		(substituted off) 72'
FW	7	(Argentina) Rogelio Funes Mori		(substituted off) 81'
Substitutions:
GK	1	(Mexico) Hugo González
DF	5	(Mexico) Luis Fuentes
DF	6	(Mexico) Efraín Juárez		(substituted on) 87'
MF	14	(Mexico) Alfonso González		(substituted on) 81'
MF	21	(Mexico) Jesús Molina		(substituted on) 72'
FW	29	(Mexico) Marco Bueno
FW	289	(Mexico) Ángel Lopez
Manager:
(Argentina) Antonio Mohamed

GK	13	(Mexico) Alfonso Blanco (c)
DF	12	(Mexico) Emmanuel García		(substituted off) 78'
DF	4	(United States) Omar Gonzalez
DF	23	(Colombia) Óscar Murillo	(yellow card) 12'
DF	18	(Mexico) Joaquín Martínez
MF	16	(Mexico) Jorge Hernández
MF	14	(Mexico) Érick Aguirre		(substituted off) 65'
MF	5	(Mexico) Víctor Guzmán
MF	2	(Japan) Keisuke Honda
FW	7	(Chile) Angelo Sagal
FW	29	(Argentina) Franco Jara		(substituted off) 65'
Substitutions:
GK	21	(Mexico) Óscar Pérez
DF	6	(Mexico) Raúl López		(substituted on) 78'
DF	26	(Uruguay) Robert Herrera
MF	19	(Mexico) Francisco Antonio Figueroa
MF	298	(Mexico) Erick Sánchez		(substituted on) 65'
FW	9	(Argentina) Germán Cano
FW	289	(Mexico) Roberto de la Rosa		(substituted on) 65'
Manager:
(Uruguay) Diego Alonso

Assistant referees:
Andres Hernández Delgado
Miguel Angel Chua Ortiz
Fourth official:
Diego Montaño Robles
