= Abundis =

Abundis is a surname. Notable people with the surname include:

- José Manuel Abundis (born 1973), Mexican footballer
- Martín Abundis (born 1996), Mexican footballer
