= Ernesto Reyes =

Ernesto Reyes may refer to:

- Ernesto Reyes (footballer) (born 1991), Mexican footballer
- Ernesto Reyes (badminton) (born 1992), Cuban badminton player
