= Avilés Hurtado =

Colombian footballer (born 1987)

Personal information
- Full name: Avilés Hurtado Herrera
- Date of birth: 20 April 1987 (age 39)
- Place of birth: Timbiquí, Colombia
- Height: 1.78 m (5 ft 10 in)
- Position: Attacking midfielder

Team information
- Current team: Deportivo Cali
- Number: 18

Youth career
- Depor Aguablanca

Senior career*
Years	Team	Apps	(Gls)
2009–2011	América de Cali	40	(6)
2011–2013	Atlético Nacional	66	(12)
2013–2014	Pachuca	38	(4)
2013–2014	→ Chiapas (loan)	17	(6)
2015–2016	Chiapas	48	(14)
2016–2017	Tijuana	40	(12)
2017–2022	Monterrey	105	(25)
2021–2022	→ Pachuca (loan)	39	(4)
2022–2023	Pachuca	34	(5)
2023–2025	Juárez	45	(9)
2025	Pachuca	0	(0)
2025–	Deportivo Cali	17	(6)

International career
2017	Colombia	2	(0)
- * Club domestic league appearances and goals as of 12 December 2025

Avilés Hurtado Herrera (born 20 April 1987) is a Colombian professional footballer who plays as a forward and attacking midfielder for Categoria Primera A club Deportivo Cali.

== Club career ==
Hurtado began his career in 2009 with América de Cali. After their relegation in 2011 he joined Atlético Nacional.

On 15 December 2012, Hurtado sign a four-year contract with Liga MX team Pachuca.

In June 2013, the Colombian player and Chiapas agreed on a season-long loan. He made his debut with Chiapas in a 2-2 tied game against Veracruz, having score twice for the Jaguars.

He returned to Pachuca for the 2014 Apertura. In December 2014, Hurtado returned to Chiapas for the Liga MX Clausura 2014.

Hurtado signed with Tijuana in 2016, joining compatriot Dayro Moreno. During his time in Tijuana he became one of the best players in the league, being named in the season's best XI for the Clausura 2017, where he scored 8 goals, including braces in against Puebla (6–2) and Atlas (3-3).

In the summer of 2017 he was purchased by Monterrey for a fee of US$9,000,000 making him the most expensive signing in the history of the club. On 5 August, he scored his first two goals for the club in a 3–0 away victory against his former club Tijuana. In total he scored 11 goals in the 2017 Apertura, improving on his 8 goals being scored the previous season, and at the end of the season was included in the Best XI. On 21 December 2017, Monterrey won the Copa MX, with Hurtado scoring the only goal in the final after receiving a pass from compatriot Dorlan Pabón.

On 31 March 2019, Hurtado scored a spectacular bicycle kick goal in a 2–2 draw against Cruz Azul. On 30 September 2019, he suffered an injury which left him out for nine months. He returned on 28 July 2020 for the Guardianes 2020 tournament against Toluca, where he provided two assists in a 3–1 victory. Later that game he suffered an injury and was ruled out for two weeks.

In May 2021, Hurtado joined Pachuca on a season-long loan. In the Clausura 2022, he scored three goals, one of these included a bicycle kick in a 3–1 victory against Club Necaxa. On 20 February, he had a man of the match performance against Club América, where he scored and provided an assist for Nicolás Ibáñez in a 3–1 victory.

On 23 October 2022, in the second leg of the league semifinals against former club Monterrey, Hurtado scored a last minute goal to win the game, and was subject to racial insults afterwards. Pachuca went on to win the title against Toluca 8–2 on aggregate.

In 2023 he joined Juárez.

In September 2024 he suffered an injury which would keep him out of play for approximately four months, and miss the rest of the league season.

== International career ==
In 2016, he became a Mexican naturalized citizen, but stated that, "The Mexican national team is only for Mexicans", putting to rest any rumors that he would be called up by El Tri. In November 2017 he made his debut with the Colombian national team.

On 4 November 2017 Hurtado was given his first international call-up by Colombia after his performances in Monterrey. He made his debut on 10 November in a 2–1 loss against South Korea.

== Honours ==
Monterrey

- Liga MX: Apertura 2019
- Copa MX: Apertura 2017, 2019–20
- CONCACAF Champions League: 2019, 2021

Pachuca

- Liga MX: Apertura 2022

Individual

- Liga MX Best XI: Clausura 2017, Apertura 2017
- Liga MX Golden Boot (Shared): Apertura 2017
- Univision Deportes Award Best Player Liga MX: 2017
- Liga MX All-Star: 2022
