= Juan Carlos Morales =

Mexican footballer (born 1992)

Juan Carlos Morales Hernández (born November 27, 1992, in Mexico City) is a former Mexican professional footballer who last played for Potros UAEM.

He earned six caps for the Mexico national beach soccer team.
