= Luis Miño =

Paraguayan footballer (born 1989)

Personal information
- Full name: Luis Alcides Miño Muñoz
- Date of birth: 8 January 1989 (age 37)
- Place of birth: Sapucaí, Paraguay
- Height: 1.83 m (6 ft 0 in)
- Position: Midfielder

Team information
- Current team: Guaireña
- Number: 15

Youth career
- –2011: Independiente

Senior career*
Years	Team	Apps	(Gls)
2011–2013	Independiente	73	(4)
2013–2016	Sportivo Luqueño	112	(14)
2016–2018	Nacional	63	(1)
2017	→ Chiapas (loan)	3	(0)
2019	Sportivo Luqueño	35	(1)
2020–	Guaireña	4	(0)

International career
2013	Paraguay	1	(0)
- * Club domestic league appearances and goals as of 19:28, 21 October 2020 (UTC)

Luis Miño (born 8 January 1989) is a Paraguayan footballer who plays as a midfielder for Guaireña FC.
