= Lucas Xavier =

Brazilian footballer (born 1994)

Personal information
- Full name: Lucas Da Silva Xavier
- Date of birth: 26 July 1994 (age 32)
- Place of birth: São Paulo, Brazil
- Height: 1.73 m (5 ft 8 in)
- Position: Winger

Senior career*
Years	Team	Apps	(Gls)
2009-2011	Bragantino	5	(0)
2012-2013	Independente de Limeira	4	(0)
2014	Grêmio Osasco Audax	6	(2)
2015–2016	Rio Claro	11	(6)
2017–2019	FC Juárez	72	(14)
2020	Mineros de Zacatecas	4	(0)
2021	Sinaloa	15	(2)
2021	Atlante	0	(0)
- * Club domestic league appearances and goals as of 9 June 2020 (UTC)

Lucas Da Silva Xavier (born 26 July 1994) is a Brazilian professional footballer who plays for Mineros de Zacatecas of Ascenso MX.

== Career ==
=== FC Juárez ===
On 13 January 2017, Lucas Xavier signed a ten-month contract with FC Juárez.

==== Clausura 2017 ====
Lucas Xavier made his debut for FC Juárez on 11 February 2017 in Ascenso MX, against Coras de Tepic, as a second-half substitute for Sidnei Sciola. He scored his first goal in the 91st minute to win the match.

On 15 February 2017, Lucas Xavier was a starter for the first time with FC Juárez at home against Dorados de Sinaloa in the Copa MX. He scored in the 19th minute in a 2-1 victory.

Lucas Xavier was a starter for the first time in the league against Loros de Colima on 4 March 2017. Lucas Xavier scored his third goal for FC Juárez against Alebrijes de Oaxaca in a 3-2 loss on 10 March 2017. On 15 March 2017, Lucas Xavier scored twice against C.D. Guadalajara in a 3-2 loss in the Copa MX quarter-finals. On 29 April 2017, Lucas Xavier scored twice in FC Juárez' 2-0 win over Dorados de Sinaloa in the second leg of the Liguilla semi-finals.

=== Mineros de Zacatecas ===
In January 2020 it was confirmed, that Lucas had joined Ascenso MX club Mineros de Zacatecas.
