= Óscar Suárez =

Mexican footballer (born 1995)

Oscar Suarez
Personal information
- Full name: Oscar Eduardo Suarez Parra
- Date of birth: April 10, 1995 (age 31)
- Place of birth: Guanajuato, Mexico
- Height: 1.74 m (5 ft 8 1/2 in)
- Position: Defender

Senior career*
Years	Team	Apps	(Gls)
2012–2017	Leon	2	(0)
2017–2019	Mineros de Zacatecas	48	(0)
2020	Cimarrones de Sonora	1	(0)
- * Club domestic league appearances and goals as of 22:34, 23 January 2020 (GMT)

Oscar Eduardo Suárez Parra (born April 10, 1995) is a professional Mexican association football (soccer) player who currently plays for Cimarrones de Sonora.
