= Diego Riolfo =

Uruguayan football player (born 1990)

Personal information
- Full name: Diego Nicolás Riolfo Pérez
- Date of birth: January 8, 1990 (age 36)
- Place of birth: Montevideo, Uruguay
- Height: 1.74 m (5 ft 9 in)
- Position: Forward

Youth career
- Central Español

Senior career*
Years	Team	Apps	(Gls)
2010–2011	Central Español	13	(1)
2011–2016	Montevideo Wanderers	36	(3)
2012–2013	→ Recreativo (loan)	11	(0)
2016–2018	Necaxa	7	(0)
2018–2019	Godoy Cruz	5	(0)
2019–2022	Montevideo Wanderers	91	(8)
- * Club domestic league appearances and goals as of 21:22, 28 February 2023 (UTC)

Diego Nicolás Riolfo Pérez (born 8 January 1990 in Montevideo), is a Uruguayan professional footballer who plays as a forward.

== Football career ==
Riolfo spent his first year as a senior with Central Español, making his debut on 28 August 2010, against Cerro. He scored his first professional goal on 4 December, against Danubio. In the 2011 summer he joined Montevideo Wanderers, but found his chances limited, only making six appearances in the whole season.

In July 2012, Riolfo moved abroad, signing a one-year loan deal with Recreativo de Huelva. On 8 September he made his debut for Recre, against Real Murcia.
