= Ernesto Reyes (footballer) =

Mexican footballer (born 1991)

Personal information
- Full name: Ernesto Alejandro Reyes Cruz
- Date of birth: 10 July 1991 (age 35)
- Place of birth: Felipe Carrillo Puerto, Quintana Roo, Mexico
- Height: 1.80 m (5 ft 11 in)
- Position: Defender

Team information
- Current team: Tlaxcala
- Number: 5

Senior career*
Years	Team	Apps	(Gls)
2008–2009	Inter Playa del Carmen	19	(0)
2009	→ Chetumal (loan)	27	(6)
2011	→ Venados (loan)	1	(0)
2011–2019	Atlante	117	(9)
2013	→ Toros Neza (loan)	9	(2)
2013–2015	→ Inter Playa del Carmen (loan)	23	(5)
2019–2020	Zacatecas	11	(0)
2020–2021	Sonora	27	(1)
2021–2023	Oaxaca	31	(3)
2024–	Tlaxcala	0	(0)
- * Club domestic league appearances and goals as of 3 May 2022

Ernesto Alejandro Reyes Cruz (Note: In this Spanish name, the first or paternal surname is Reyes and the second or maternal family name is Cruz.) (born 10 July 1991) is a Mexican professional footballer who plays as a defender.
