= Martín Abundis =

Mexican footballer (born 1996)

Martín Abundiz
Personal information
- Full name: Martín Alexander Abundiz Aldana
- Date of birth: 10 April 1996 (age 30)
- Place of birth: Guadalajara, Jalisco, Mexico
- Height: 1.81 m (5 ft 11 in)
- Position: Forward

Team information
- Current team: Deportiva Venados
- Number: 7

Youth career
- Toluca

Senior career*
Years	Team	Apps	(Gls)
2014–2019	Toluca	10	(1)
2018	→ Celaya (loan)	8	(1)
2019	→ Potros UAEM (loan)	4	(0)
2019–2020	→ Tlaxcala (loan)	6	(1)
2020	Atlético Capitalino	0	(0)
2021	Zitácuaro	10	(6)
2021	Atlético Capitalino	0	(0)
2022–2023	Cafetaleros de Chiapas	26	(6)
2023–	Deportiva Venados		
- * Club domestic league appearances and goals as of 22:53, 25 November 2019 (UTC)

Martín Alexander Abundiz Aldana (born 10 April 1996) is a Mexican footballer who plays as a forward for Deportiva Venados of the Liga Premier de México.

== Club career ==
=== Toluca ===
Abundiz joined Toluca in 2011. He progressed through the youth ranks, competing for the U-15, U-17 and U-20 sides before he was called up to the senior team in 2014. He made his first appearance with the first team on April 19, 2014, under coach José Cardozo, in a Liga MX match against Club Atlas coming on as a substitute for Daniel González in the 84th minute. The match ended in a 1–0 loss. On May 7, 2016, Abundiz scored his first professional goal in a Liga MX match against Monterrey, scoring the game-winning header in the 69th minute after being a halftime substitute. The match ended 1–2 to Toluca at the Estadio BBVA Bancomer.

== Personal life ==
Abundiz is the son of former Toluca and Mexico striker, José Manuel Abundis.

== Career statistics ==
=== Club ===
As of 18 December 2017.

Club statistics
Club	Season	League			National Cup		Continental		Total	
Club	Season	Division	Apps	Goals	Apps	Goals	Apps	Goals	Apps	Goals
Toluca	2013–14	Liga MX	1	0	—		0	0	1	0
Toluca	2014–15	Liga MX	0	0	3	0	—		3	0
Toluca	2015–16	Liga MX	2	1	3	0	—		5	1
Toluca	2016–17	Liga MX	2	0	1	0	—		3	0
Toluca	2017–18	Liga MX	5	0	3	2	—		8	2
Toluca	Total		10	1	10	2	0	0	20	3
Career total			10	1	10	2	0	0	20	3
