= Daniel Amador =

Mexican footballer (born 1997)

Personal information
- Full name: Daniel Guadalupe Amador Osuna
- Date of birth: 22 March 1997 (age 29)
- Place of birth: Ciudad Constitución, Baja California Sur, Mexico
- Height: 1.72 m (5 ft 8 in)
- Position: Attacking midfielder

Team information
- Current team: Jaguares
- Number: 10

Youth career
- 2014–2016: UdeG

Senior career*
Years	Team	Apps	(Gls)
2016–2022	UdeG	120	(16)
2019	→ UAT (loan)	12	(2)
2021	→ Mazatlán (loan)	17	(1)
2022–2024	UAT	59	(5)
2024	Tlaxcala	12	(0)
2025–	Jaguares	0	(0)
- * Club domestic league appearances and goals as of 20 October 2022

Daniel Guadalupe Amador Osuna (born 22 March 1997) is a Mexican professional footballer who plays as an attacking midfielder.

Nicknamed Chimpa, Amador is a native of Ciudad Constitución.
