= Dorlan Pabón =

Colombian footballer (born 1988)

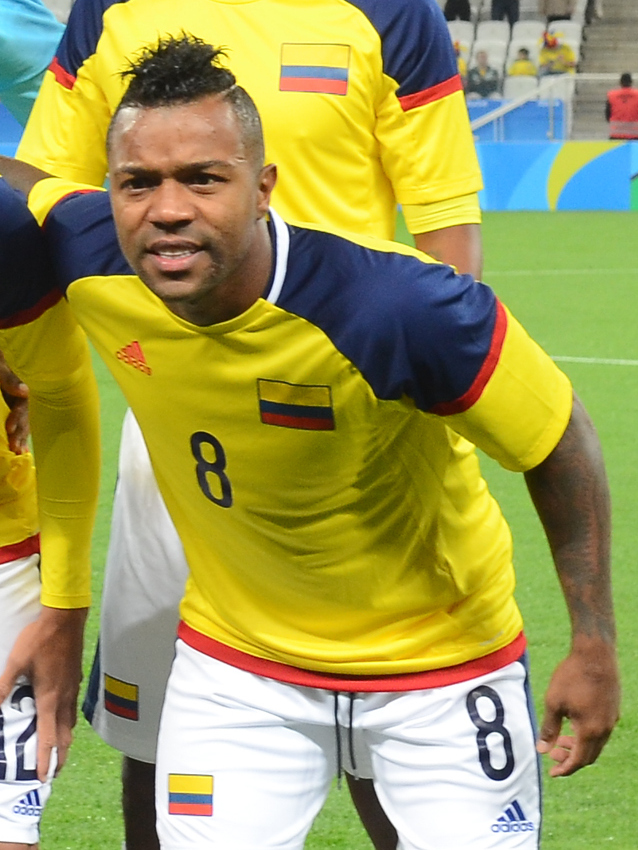
- Pabón with Colombia at the 2016 Summer Olympics

Personal information
- Full name: Dorlan Mauricio Pabón Ríos
- Date of birth: 24 January 1988 (age 38)
- Place of birth: Medellín, Colombia
- Height: 1.68 m (5 ft 6 in)
- Position: Forward

Team information
- Current team: Envigado

Youth career
- Bajo Cauca

Senior career*
Years	Team	Apps	(Gls)
2006–2010	Envigado	67	(26)
2010–2012	Atlético Nacional	71	(34)
2012–2013	Parma	12	(0)
2013	→ Betis (loan)	17	(8)
2013	Monterrey	6	(3)
2013–2014	Valencia	13	(3)
2014	→ São Paulo (loan)	7	(1)
2014–2021	Monterrey	244	(73)
2021–2024	Atlético Nacional	96	(22)
2024–	Envigado	15	(2)

International career
2009–2012	Colombia	16	(3)
2016	Colombia Olympic	4	(2)
- * Club domestic league appearances and goals as of 22 November 2024

Dorlan Mauricio Pabón Ríos (born 24 January 1988) is a Colombian professional footballer who plays as a forward for Envigado. He is nicknamed Memín, after an old Mexican comic character named Memín Pinguín.

== Club career ==
=== Envigado ===
Pabón started his career with Envigado, where he became the top goalscorer of the 2008 Copa Colombia alongside Wilson Mena.

=== Nacional ===
In 2010, Pabón moved to Colombian team Atlético Nacional. He is remembered for scoring a free-kick from 40 yards against Peñarol during a 2012 Copa Libertadores group stage game which Nacional won 4–0 away from home, with two of the goals coming from Pabón. Nacional went on to lose in the Round of 16 against Velez Sarsfield. Pabón ended the Copa Libertadores tournament with 7 goals, and being named player of the week for the tournament once, in 21–23 February.

With Nacional, Pabón also won the 2011 Liga Postobón Apertura, in which Nacional faced La Equidad, after losing the first leg 2–1, Nacional needed to win by a goal in the second leg to go into penalties. Pabón scored two goals in the away leg which ended 2–1, and scored his penalty in the shootout, which helped Nacional win its 11th National title. He has also scored a total of 50 goals in 71 games for Nacional since his arrival.

=== Parma ===
Pabón attracted interest from many European clubs, eventually joining Serie A club Parma F.C. on 27 June 2012, signing a five-year contract. His spell in Italy was not a great success, producing 1 goal in 11 games. During the January 2013 transfer window, C.F. Monterrey announced that Pabón would be transferred the following summer to play for them.

==== Betis (loan) ====
Shortly after being transferred to Monterrey, it was announced that Pabón would be loaned to Real Betis in Spain for the next six months. However, he was registered as a loan by Parma because FIFA does not allow a player to be registered to three teams in one season. Therefore, having been registered by Monterrey he would not have been able to play for Betis. Pabón scored a higher goal per game ratio in Spain than he did in Italy. He notably scored a goal against FC Barcelona in just the first minute of the game.

=== Valencia ===
On 16 August 2013, it was announced that Pabón would be returning to La Liga with Valencia CF, after spending just a summer at C.F. Monterrey. Having been impressed with his short spell at Betis for the latter half of the 2012–13 season, Valencia agreed to pay €7.5 million for his services. On 1 September 2013, he made his debut in his new team, against FC Barcelona in an eventual 2–3 home loss. Pabón scored his first goal for the Che on 19 October 2013, in a 1–2 loss to Real Sociedad.

==== São Paulo (loan) ====
On 27 January 2014, Pabón signed for one year on loan with Brazilian side São Paulo FC. Even after being Valencia's most expensive signing in the 2013–14 transfer window, Pabón did not adapt in Valencia and, with Eduardo Vargas' arrival, he faced more competition for a place in the first team, resulting in his decision to join another club.

Pabón scored his first goal for his new club on 26 February: in a penalty kick, the Colombian scored the last goal of a 3–1 victory against XV de Piracicaba, in a 2014 São Paulo State League game. Pabón asked for Rogério Ceni, long-time idol in the club and official penalty kicker, to take it. According to Ceni: "He had already asked me to take it against Santos (who São Paulo faced before XV de Piracicaba). But this is not a problem here."

On 3 June 2014, Pabón left Tricolor, with the club, in its site, thanking the forward by his presentations for the city of the same name's side. In his last game for club, on 31 May, in the 2–1 win against Atlético Mineiro, Pabón scored the winning goal in the last minutes of the game. He said: "I remain very happy for the opportunity to have played for a giant club as São Paulo FC who gave me my first passage into Brazilian football."

==== Monterrey ====
In June 2014, the Monterrey confirmed it had signed the Colombian from Valencia for $7 million. On 1 July 2021, Pabón and C.F. Monterrey parted ways by mutual consent.

== Club statistics ==
As of 19 October 2016

Club	Season	League			Cup			Continental			Other			Total		
Club	Season	Apps	Goals	Assists	Apps	Goals	Assists	Apps	Goals	Assists	Apps	Goals	Assists	Apps	Goals	Assists
Real Betis	2012–13	17	8	6	0	0	0	0	0	0	—			17	8	6
Total		17	8	6	0	0	0	0	0	0	—			17	8	6
Monterrey	2013–14	6	3	2	1	2	0	0	0	0	—			7	5	2
Total		6	3	2	1	2	0	0	0	0	—			7	5	2
Valencia	2013–14	13	3	0	2	0	0	3	0	0	—			18	3	0
Total		13	3	0	2	0	0	3	0	0	—			18	3	0
São Paulo	2014	7	1	1	3	0	0	0	0	0	8	1	0	18	1	1
Total		7	1	1	3	0	0	0	0	0	8	1	0	18	1	1
Monterrey	2014–15	35	22	8	7	7	2	0	0	0	—			42	29	10
Monterrey	2015–16	39	16	11	1	1	1	0	0	0	—			40	17	12
Monterrey	2016–17	22	11	3	1	0	0	1	0	1	—			24	11	4
Total		102	52	22	10	10	3	1	0	1	—			113	62	26
Career totals		139	64	31	12	10	3	3	0	1	8	1	0	166	74	35

== Honours ==
Atlético Nacional

- Categoría Primera A (2): 2011-1, 2022–1.

Monterrey

- Liga MX (1): Apertura 2019
- Copa MX (2): Apertura 2017, 2019–20
- CONCACAF Champions League (2): 2019, 2021

Individual

- Liga MX Golden Boot: Clausura 2015

== International career ==
Pabón made his debut for the senior side for a 2010 FIFA World Cup qualification match against Chile. His first goal for the senior side came against Bolivia in La Paz for a 2014 FIFA World Cup qualification match, Colombia went on to win the match 2–1 thanks to a late goal from Falcao. His second goal for Colombia came against Argentina in Barranquilla. Colombia went on to lose the game 2–1.

#	Date	Venue	Opponent	Score	Final	Competition
1.	11 October 2011	Estadio Hernando Siles, La Paz, Bolivia	Bolivia	0–1	1–2	2014 WCQ
2.	15 November 2011	Estadio Metropolitano Roberto Meléndez, Barranquilla, Colombia	Argentina	1–0	1–2	2014 WCQ
3.	16 October 2012	Estadio Metropolitano Roberto Meléndez, Barranquilla, Colombia	Cameroon	3–0	3–0	Friendly
